= 1989 Vitosha New Otani Open – Doubles =

Doubles
- 1989 Vitosha New Otani Open
- 1988 Champions: (Spain) Conchita Martínez (Austria) Barbara Paulus

Final
- Champions: (Italy) Laura Garrone (Italy) Laura Golarsa
- Runners-up: (West Germany) Silke Meier (Bulgaria) Elena Pampoulova
- Score: 6–4, 7–5

Events
Singles	Doubles
← 1988 ·	Vitosha New Otani Open	· 1990 →

Conchita Martínez and Barbara Paulus were the defending champions but did not compete that year.

Laura Garrone and Laura Golarsa won in the final 6–4, 7–5 against Silke Meier and Elena Pampoulova.

== Seeds ==
Champion seeds are indicated in bold text while text in italics indicates the round in which those seeds were eliminated.

1. (Czechoslovakia) Iva Budařová / (Czechoslovakia) Petra Langrová (first round)
2. (Australia) Tracey Morton / (Austria) Heidi Sprung (semifinals)
3. (Italy) Marzia Grossi / (Italy) Barbara Romanò (quarterfinals)
4. (Italy) **Laura Garrone** / (Italy) **Laura Golarsa (champions)**

== Draw ==
=== Key ===
- Q = Qualifier
- WC = Wild card
- LL = Lucky loser
- Alt = Alternate
- SE = Special exempt
- PR = Protected ranking
- ITF = ITF entry
- JE = Junior exempt
- w/o = Walkover
- r = Retired
- d = Defaulted
- SR = Special ranking

First round
1	(Czechoslovakia) I Budařová (Czechoslovakia) P Langrová	4	**6**	4
(Czechoslovakia) **M Frimmelová** (Hungary) **R Szikszay**	**6**	4	**6**
(Bulgaria) R Milorieva (Bulgaria) T Nikolova	4	3
(Czechoslovakia) **L Lásková** (Greece) **A Mitropoulou**	**6**	**6**
4	(Italy) **L Garrone** (Italy) **L Golarsa**	**6**	**6**
(France) A Dechaume (France) M Laval	4	1
(Sweden) **M Ekstrand** (United Kingdom) **A Simpkin**	2	**6**	**6**
(West Germany) S Frankl (West Germany) S Hack	**6**	4	2
(West Germany) **S Meier** (Bulgaria) **E Pampoulova**	**6**	**6**
(Bulgaria) S Krivencheva (Bulgaria) I Stoilova	1	1
(Bulgaria) G Angelova (Bulgaria) P Gogovska	1	3
3	(Italy) **M Grossi** (Italy) **B Romanò**	**6**	**6**
(United States) J Joseph (Austria) M Maruska	5	4
(Socialist Federal Republic of Yugoslavia) **S Goleš** (Greece) **A Kanellopoulou**	**7**	**6**
(West Germany) V Martinek (Romania) D Moise	0	6
2	(Australia) **T Morton** (Austria) **H Sprung**	**6**	**7**

Quarterfinals
(Czechoslovakia) **M Frimmelová** (Hungary) **R Szikszay**	**6**	**6**
(Czechoslovakia) L Lásková (Greece) A Mitropoulou	1	0
4	(Italy) **L Garrone** (Italy) **L Golarsa**	**6**	5	**6**
(Sweden) M Ekstrand (United Kingdom) A Simpkin	2	**7**	3
(West Germany) **S Meier** (Bulgaria) **E Pampoulova**	**6**	**7**
3	(Italy) M Grossi (Italy) B Romanò	1	5
(Socialist Federal Republic of Yugoslavia) S Goleš (Greece) A Kanellopoulou	3	3
2	(Australia) **T Morton** (Austria) **H Sprung**	**6**	**6**

Semifinals
(Czechoslovakia) M Frimmelová (Hungary) R Szikszay	**7**	3	2
4	(Italy) **L Garrone** (Italy) **L Golarsa**	6	**6**	**6**
(West Germany) **S Meier** (Bulgaria) **E Pampoulova**	0	**6**	**6**
2	(Australia) T Morton (Austria) H Sprung	**6**	1	4

Final
4	(Italy) **Laura Garrone** (Italy) **Laura Golarsa**	**6**	**7**
(West Germany) Silke Meier (Bulgaria) Elena Pampoulova	4	5
