= 1989 Vitosha New Otani Open – Singles =

Singles
- 1989 Vitosha New Otani Open
- 1988 Champion: (Spain) Conchita Martínez

Final
- Champion: (West Germany) Isabel Cueto
- Runner-up: (Bulgaria) Katerina Maleeva
- Score: 6–2, 7–6

Events
| Singles | Doubles |
| ← 1988 · | Vitosha New Otani Open | · 1990 → |

Conchita Martínez was the defending champion but did not compete that year.

Isabel Cueto won in the final 6–2, 7–6 against Katerina Maleeva.

== Seeds ==
A champion seed is indicated in bold text while text in italics indicates the round in which that seed was eliminated.

1. (Bulgaria) Katerina Maleeva (final)
2. (West Germany) **Isabel Cueto (champion)**
3. (Italy) Laura Golarsa (first round)
4. (Czechoslovakia) Petra Langrová (quarterfinals)
5. (Italy) Laura Garrone (first round)
6. (Socialist Federal Republic of Yugoslavia) Sabrina Goleš (quarterfinals)
7. (Greece) Angeliki Kanellopoulou (semifinals)
8. (West Germany) Sabine Hack (second round)

== Draw ==
=== Key ===
- Q = Qualifier
- WC = Wild card
- LL = Lucky loser
- Alt = Alternate
- SE = Special exempt
- PR = Protected ranking
- ITF = ITF entry
- JE = Junior exempt
- w/o = Walkover
- r = Retired
- d = Defaulted
- SR = Special ranking

First round
1 | (Bulgaria) **K Maleeva** | **6** | **7**
(United Kingdom) A Simpkin | 3 | 5
LL | (Hungary) **R Szikszay** | **6** | 6 | **7**
(West Germany) S Frankl | 4 | **7** | 5
(West Germany) **S Meier** | 2 | **6** | **6**
(France) M-C Damas | **6** | 4 | 1
(France) A Dechaume | **6** | 2 | 0
8 | (West Germany) **S Hack** | 0 | **6** | **6**
4 | (Czechoslovakia) **P Langrová** | **7** | 5 | **6**
(Italy) M Grossi | 6 | **7** | 1
(Italy) **F Bonsignori** | **7** | **6**
Q | (West Germany) C Singer | 6 | 2
Q | (Australia) T Morton | **7** | 3 | 2
(Czechoslovakia) **L Lásková** | 6 | **6** | **6**
(Italy) **B Romanò** | **6** | **6**
5 | (Italy) L Garrone | 3 | 0
7 | (Greece) **A Kanellopoulou** | **6** | **6**
Q | (Austria) M Maruska | 3 | 1
(West Germany) S Menning | 3 | 3
Q | (Czechoslovakia) **M Frimmelová** | **6** | **6**
(France) **M Laval** | **6** | 4 | **7**
(United States) J Joseph | 2 | **6** | 6
(Sweden) **C Dahlman** | **6** | **6**
3 | (Italy) L Golarsa | 0 | 0
6 | (Socialist Federal Republic of Yugoslavia) **S Goleš** | **6** | **6**
(Bulgaria) S Krivencheva | 1 | 2
(Finland) P Thorén | 1 | 4
(Czechoslovakia) **I Budařová** | **6** | **6**
(Luxembourg) **K Kschwendt** | 1 | **7** | **6**
(Sweden) M Ekstrand | **6** | 6 | 1
(Bulgaria) E Pampoulova | 2 | 4
2 | (West Germany) **I Cueto** | **6** | **6**

Second round
1 | (Bulgaria) **K Maleeva** | **6** | **7**
LL | (Hungary) R Szikszay | 0 | 5
(West Germany) **S Meier** | 1 | **6** | **6**
8 | (West Germany) S Hack | **6** | 4 | 4
4 | (Czechoslovakia) **P Langrová** | **7** | **6**
(Italy) F Bonsignori | 6 | 2
(Czechoslovakia) L Lásková | 2 | 2
(Italy) **B Romanò** | **6** | **6**
7 | (Greece) **A Kanellopoulou** | **6** | **6**
Q | (Czechoslovakia) M Frimmelová | 3 | 3
(France) M Laval | 5 | 1
(Sweden) **C Dahlman** | **7** | **6**
6 | (Socialist Federal Republic of Yugoslavia) **S Goleš** | **6** | **6**
(Czechoslovakia) I Budařová | 2 | 2
(Luxembourg) K Kschwendt | **6** | 4 | 0
2 | (West Germany) **I Cueto** | 2 | **6** | **6**

Quarterfinals
1 | (Bulgaria) **K Maleeva** | **6** | **6**
(West Germany) S Meier | 4 | 4
4 | (Czechoslovakia) P Langrová | **6** | 2 | 2
(Italy) **B Romanò** | 2 | **6** | **6**
7 | (Greece) **A Kanellopoulou** | **7** | **6**
(Sweden) C Dahlman | 6 | 0
6 | (Socialist Federal Republic of Yugoslavia) S Goleš | 1 | 5
2 | (West Germany) **I Cueto** | **6** | **7**

Semifinals
1 | (Bulgaria) **K Maleeva** | **6** | **6**
(Italy) B Romanò | 2 | 3
7 | (Greece) A Kanellopoulou | 5 | 1
2 | (West Germany) **I Cueto** | **7** | **6**

Final
1 | (Bulgaria) Katerina Maleeva | 2 | 6
2 | (West Germany) **Isabel Cueto** | **6** | **7**
