= 1986 Federation Cup (tennis) =

International women's tennis competition

Details
- Duration: 20–27 July
- Edition: 24th

Champion
- Winning nation: United States

The 1986 Federation Cup was the 24th edition of the most important competition between national teams in women's tennis. The tournament was held at I. ČLTK Prague in Prague, Czechoslovakia, from 20 to 27 July. The United States defeated three-time defending champions Czechoslovakia in the final (in what was a rematch of last year's final), giving the USA their 12th title. The finals marked Martina Navratilova's first return to Czechoslovakia since her defection to the United States in 1975.

== Qualifying round ==
All ties were played at I. ČLTK Prague in Prague, Czechoslovakia, on clay courts.

Winning team	Score	Losing team
Romania	2–1	Ireland
Belgium	3–0	Finland
Indonesia	3–0	Chile
Poland	3–0	Mexico
Egypt	w/o	Senegal
South Korea	3–0	Luxembourg
China	3–0	Israel
Malta	3–0	Chinese Taipei
Yugoslavia	3–0	Norway
Uruguay	2–1	Philippines

Winning nations advance to Main Draw, losing nations play in Consolation rounds.

=== Romania vs. Ireland ===
Romania
2
I. Czech Lawn Tennis Club, Prague, Czechoslovakia
July 1986
Red clay (outdoors)

Ireland
1

			1	2	3
1	(Romania) (Republic of Ireland)	Teodora Tache; Siobhán Nicholson	6; 1	6; 1
2	(Romania) (Republic of Ireland)	Daniela Moise; Jennifer Thornton	4; 6	6; 1	6; 0
3	(Romania) (Republic of Ireland)	Daniela Moise / Teodora Tache; Siobhán Nicholson / Lesley O'Halloran	3; 6	7^{7} 6^{0}	4; 6

=== Belgium vs. Finland ===
Belgium
3
I. Czech Lawn Tennis Club, Prague, Czechoslovakia
July 1986
Red clay (outdoors)

Finland
0

			1	2	3
1	(Belgium) (Finland)	Sandra Wasserman; Petra Thorén	6; 2	6; 3
2	(Belgium) (Finland)	Ann Devries; Anne Aallonen	6; 2	3; 6	6; 0
3	(Belgium) (Finland)	Ilse de Ruysscher / Ann Devries; Maija Suonpää / Petra Thorén	5; 7	6; 2	6; 3

=== Indonesia vs. Chile ===
Indonesia
3
I. Czech Lawn Tennis Club, Prague, Czechoslovakia
July 1986
Red clay (outdoors)

Chile
0

			1	2	3
1	(Indonesia) (Chile)	Yayuk Basuki; Natalie Rodríguez	7^{10} 6^{8}	6; 2
2	(Indonesia) (Chile)	Suzanna Anggarkusuma; Paulina Sepúlveda	6; 3	6; 2
3	(Indonesia) (Chile)	Yayuk Basuki / Sri Utaminingsih; Macarena Miranda / Natalie Rodríguez	6; 0	6; 2

=== Poland vs. Mexico ===
Poland
3
I. Czech Lawn Tennis Club, Prague, Czechoslovakia
July 1986
Red clay (outdoors)

Mexico
0

			1	2	3
1	(Poland) (Mexico)	Ewa Zerdecka; Mónica Muñoz	6; 0	6; 2
2	(Poland) (Mexico)	Monika Waniek; Claudia Hernández	6; 4	2; 6	6; 4
3	(Poland) (Mexico)	Renata Skrzypczyńska / Ewa Zerdecka; Zarina Galván / Mónica Muñoz	6; 2	6; 1

=== South Korea vs. Luxembourg ===
South Korea
3
I. Czech Lawn Tennis Club, Prague, Czechoslovakia
July 1986
Red clay (outdoors)

Luxembourg
0

			1	2	3
1	(South Korea) (Luxembourg)	Lee Jeong-soon; Pascale Welter	6; 1	6; 0
2	(South Korea) (Luxembourg)	Kim Soo-ok; Karin Kschwendt	4; 6	6; 2	6; 3
3	(South Korea) (Luxembourg)	Lee Jeong-soon / Park Jeom-re; Ginette Huberty / Karin Kschwendt	6; 2	6; 4

=== China vs. Israel ===
China
3
I. Czech Lawn Tennis Club, Prague, Czechoslovakia
July 1986
Red clay (outdoors)

Israel
0

			1	2	3
1	(China) (Israel)	Duan Li-Lan; Sagit Doron	6; 2	6; 3
2	(China) (Israel)	Zhong Ni; Ilana Berger	4; 6	6; 2	8; 6
3	(China) (Israel)	Duan Li-Lan / Pu Xin-Fen; Ilana Berger / Sagit Doron	6; 2	6^{5} 7^{7}	6; 3

=== Malta vs. Chinese Taipei ===
Malta
3
I. Czech Lawn Tennis Club, Prague, Czechoslovakia
July 1986
Red clay (outdoors)

Chinese Taipei
0

			1	2	3
1	(Malta) (Chinese Taipei)	Alexia Gera; Lai Su-lin	7; 5	6; 3
2	(Malta) (Chinese Taipei)	Carol Cassar-Torreggiani; Ho Chiu-mei	6; 1	6; 1
3	(Malta) (Chinese Taipei)	Katherine Camilleri / Carol Cassar-Torreggiani; Lai Su-jen / Lai Su-lin	7^{7} 6^{5}	4; 6	6; 2

=== Yugoslavia vs. Norway ===
Yugoslavia
3
I. Czech Lawn Tennis Club, Prague, Czechoslovakia
July 1986
Red clay (outdoors)

Norway
0

			1	2	3
1	(Socialist Federal Republic of Yugoslavia) (Norway)	Karmen Škulj; Astrid Sunde	6; 2	6; 1
2	(Socialist Federal Republic of Yugoslavia) (Norway)	Sabrina Goleš; Amy Jönsson Raaholt	6; 2	6; 0
3	(Socialist Federal Republic of Yugoslavia) (Norway)	Sabrina Goleš / Aila Winkler; Amy Jönsson Raaholt / Astrid Sunde	6; 3	7^{7} 6^{2}

=== Uruguay vs. Philippines ===
Uruguay
2
I. Czech Lawn Tennis Club, Prague, Czechoslovakia
July 1986
Red clay (outdoors)

Philippines
1

			1	2	3
1	(Uruguay) (Philippines)	Silvana Casaretto; Jennifer Saberon	6; 2	6; 4
2	(Uruguay) (Philippines)	Fiorella Bonicelli; Dyan Castillejo	7^{7} 6^{4}	6; 1
3	(Uruguay) (Philippines)	Fiorella Bonicelli / Silvana Casaretto; Dyan Castillejo / Jennifer Saberon	4; 6	4; 6

== Main draw ==
Participating Teams
Argentina	Australia	Austria	Belgium	Brazil	Bulgaria	Canada	China
Czechoslovakia	Denmark	Egypt	France	Great Britain	Greece	Hungary	Indonesia
Italy	Japan	Malta	Netherlands	New Zealand	Poland	Romania	South Korea
Soviet Union	Spain	Sweden	Switzerland	United States	Uruguay	West Germany	Yugoslavia

First Round
Czechoslovakia	3
Greece	0
Q	Malta	0
Switzerland	3
Great Britain	0
Denmark	3
Hungary	1
Australia	2
Netherlands	1
Canada	2
Japan	1
Austria	2
Q	Egypt	0
Q	South Korea	3
Q	Uruguay	0
Argentina	3
Bulgaria	2
Soviet Union	1
France	3
Sweden	0
Brazil	2
Q	Romania	1
Q	Belgium	0
West Germany	3
Italy	2
New Zealand	1
Q	Yugoslavia	3
Q	Poland	0
Spain	2
Q	Indonesia	1
Q	China	0
United States	3

Second Round
Czechoslovakia	3
Switzerland	0
Denmark	1
Australia	2
Canada	0
Austria	3
Q	South Korea	1
Argentina	2
Bulgaria	2
France	1
Brazil	1
West Germany	2
Italy	2
Q	Yugoslavia	0
Spain	0
United States	3

Quarterfinals
Czechoslovakia	3
Australia	0
Austria	0
Argentina	3
Bulgaria	1
West Germany	2
Italy	1
United States	2

Semifinals
Czechoslovakia	2
Argentina	1
West Germany	0
United States	3

Final
Czechoslovakia	0
United States	3

1st Round losing teams play in Consolation rounds

=== First round ===
==== Czechoslovakia vs. Greece ====
Czechoslovakia
3
I. Czech Lawn Tennis Club, Prague, Czechoslovakia
July 1986
Red clay (outdoors)

Greece
0

			1	2	3
1	(Czechoslovakia) (Greece)	Helena Suková; Olga Tsarbopoulou	6; 2	6; 0
2	(Czechoslovakia) (Greece)	Hana Mandlíková; Angeliki Kanellopoulou	6; 1	5; 7	6; 3
3	(Czechoslovakia) (Greece)	Andrea Holíková / Regina Maršíková; Angeliki Kanellopoulou / Olga Tsarbopoulou	6; 3	6; 0

==== Malta vs. Switzerland ====
Malta
0
I. Czech Lawn Tennis Club, Prague, Czechoslovakia
July 1986
Red clay (outdoors)

Switzerland
3

			1	2	3
1	(Malta) (Switzerland)	Alexia Gera; Céline Cohen	0; 6	1; 6
2	(Malta) (Switzerland)	Carol Cassar-Torreggiani; Christiane Jolissaint	1; 1	1; 1
3	(Malta) (Switzerland)	Katherine Camilleri / Carol Cassar-Torreggiani; Christiane Jolissaint / Anne-Marie Rüegg	4; 6	6; 3	6; 8

==== Great Britain vs. Denmark ====
Great Britain
0
I. Czech Lawn Tennis Club, Prague, Czechoslovakia
July 1986
Red clay (outdoors)

Denmark
3

			1	2	3
1	(United Kingdom) (Denmark)	Anne Hobbs; Lone Vandborg	6; 3	5; 7	3; 6
2	(United Kingdom) (Denmark)	Jo Durie; Tine Scheuer-Larsen	3; 6	1; 6
3	(United Kingdom) (Denmark)	Jo Durie / Anne Hobbs; Anne Møller / Tine Scheuer-Larsen	2; 6	6^{1} 7^{7}

==== Hungary vs. Australia ====
Hungary
1
I. Czech Lawn Tennis Club, Prague, Czechoslovakia
July 1986
Red clay (outdoors)

Australia
2

			1	2	3
1	(Hungary) (Australia)	Csilla Cserépy; Anne Minter	1; 6	4; 6
2	(Hungary) (Australia)	Andrea Temesvári; Wendy Turnbull	6; 1	6; 1
3	(Hungary) (Australia)	Csilla Cserépy / Andrea Temesvári; Elizabeth Smylie / Wendy Turnbull	7; 5	4; 6	0; 6

==== Netherlands vs. Canada ====
Netherlands
1
I. Czech Lawn Tennis Club, Prague, Czechoslovakia
July 1986
Red clay (outdoors)

Canada
2

			1	2	3
1	(Netherlands) (Canada)	Hellas ter Riet; Helen Kelesi	6; 2	7^{7} 6^{5}
2	(Netherlands) (Canada)	Marianne van der Torre; Carling Bassett	2; 6	0; 6
3	(Netherlands) (Canada)	Hellas ter Riet / Marianne van der Torre; Carling Bassett / Jill Hetherington	6; 5	3; 6	1; 6

==== Japan vs. Austria ====
Japan
1
I. Czech Lawn Tennis Club, Prague, Czechoslovakia
July 1986
Red clay (outdoors)

Austria
2

			1	2	3
1	(Japan) (Austria)	Masako Yanagi; Judith Wiesner	6; 0	2; 6	5; 7
2	(Japan) (Austria)	Etsuko Inoue; Petra Huber	3; 6	4; 6
3	(Japan) (Austria)	Etsuko Inoue / Masako Yanagi; Petra Huber / Judith Wiesner	6; 1	2; 6	8; 6

==== Egypt vs. South Korea ====
Egypt
0
I. Czech Lawn Tennis Club, Prague, Czechoslovakia
July 1986
Red clay (outdoors)

South Korea
3

			1	2	3
1	(Egypt) (South Korea)	Shahira Tawfik; Park Jeom-re	0; 6	0; 6
2	(Egypt) (South Korea)	Anjy Fahmy; Lee Jeong-soon	0; 6	1; 6
3	(Egypt) (South Korea)	Anjy Fahmy / Shahira Tawfik; Kim Il-soon / Kim Soo-ok	0; 6	0; 6

==== Uruguay vs. Argentina ====
Uruguay
0
I. Czech Lawn Tennis Club, Prague, Czechoslovakia
July 1986
Red clay (outdoors)

Argentina
3

			1	2	3
1	(Uruguay) (Argentina)	Silvana Casaretto; Mercedes Paz	1; 6	0; 6
2	(Uruguay) (Argentina)	Fiorella Bonicelli; Gabriela Sabatini	1; 6	1; 6
3	(Uruguay) (Argentina)	Fiorella Bonicelli / Silvana Casaretto; Mercedes Paz / Gabriela Sabatini	1; 6	1; 6

==== Bulgaria vs. Soviet Union ====
Bulgaria
2
I. Czech Lawn Tennis Club, Prague, Czechoslovakia
July 1986
Red clay (outdoors)

Soviet Union
1

			1	2	3
1	(Bulgaria) (Soviet Union)	Katerina Maleeva; Natasha Zvereva	4; 6	6; 1	6; 2
2	(Bulgaria) (Soviet Union)	Manuela Maleeva; Larisa Savchenko	6; 2	6; 1
3	(Bulgaria) (Soviet Union)	Katerina Maleeva / Manuela Maleeva; Svetlana Cherneva / Larisa Savchenko	6; 1	4; 6	1; 6

==== France vs. Sweden ====
France
3
I. Czech Lawn Tennis Club, Prague, Czechoslovakia
July 1986
Red clay (outdoors)

Sweden
0

			1	2	3
1	(France) (Sweden)	Isabelle Demongeot; Helena Dahlström	6; 4	6; 1
2	(France) (Sweden)	Catherine Tanvier; Catarina Lindqvist	4; 6	6; 2	6; 0
3	(France) (Sweden)	Pascale Paradis / Nathalie Tauziat; Helena Dahlström / Monica Lundqvist	6; 3	5; 7	6; 2

==== Brazil vs. Romania ====
Brazil
2
I. Czech Lawn Tennis Club, Prague, Czechoslovakia
July 1986
Red clay (outdoors)

Romania
1

			1	2	3
1	(Brazil) (Romania)	Niege Dias; Teodora Tache	7^{7} 6^{3}	6; 3
2	(Brazil) (Romania)	Patricia Medrado; Daniela Moise	3; 6	2; 6
3	(Brazil) (Romania)	Niege Dias / Patricia Medrado; Daniela Moise / Teodora Tache	6; 2	4; 6	6; 1

==== Belgium vs. West Germany ====
Belgium
0
I. Czech Lawn Tennis Club, Prague, Czechoslovakia
July 1986
Red clay (outdoors)

West Germany
3

			1	2	3
1	(Belgium) (West Germany)	Sandra Wasserman; Claudia Kohde-Kilsch	6; 4	1; 6	1; 6
2	(Belgium) (West Germany)	Ann Devries; Steffi Graf	3; 6	1; 6
3	(Belgium) (West Germany)	Ann Devries / Sandra Wasserman; Steffi Graf / Claudia Kohde-Kilsch	1; 6	5; 7

==== Italy vs. New Zealand ====
Italy
2
I. Czech Lawn Tennis Club, Prague, Czechoslovakia
July 1986
Red clay (outdoors)

New Zealand
1

			1	2	3
1	(Italy) (New Zealand)	Laura Garrone; Julie Richardson	6; 1	6; 1
2	(Italy) (New Zealand)	Raffaella Reggi; Belinda Cordwell	6; 3	6; 4
3	(Italy) (New Zealand)	Sandra Cecchini / Raffaella Reggi; Belinda Cordwell / Julie Richardson	3; 6	3; 6

==== Yugoslavia vs. Poland ====
Yugoslavia
3
I. Czech Lawn Tennis Club, Prague, Czechoslovakia
July 1986
Red clay (outdoors)

Poland
0

			1	2	3
1	(Socialist Federal Republic of Yugoslavia) (Poland)	Karmen Škulj; Ewa Zerdecka	6; 3	7; 5
2	(Socialist Federal Republic of Yugoslavia) (Poland)	Sabrina Goleš; Monika Waniek	6; 3	6; 3
3	(Socialist Federal Republic of Yugoslavia) (Poland)	Sabrina Goleš / Aila Winkler; Monika Waniek / Renata Skrzypczyńska	6; 4	6; 3

==== Spain vs. Indonesia ====
Spain
2
I. Czech Lawn Tennis Club, Prague, Czechoslovakia
July 1986
Red clay (outdoors)

Indonesia
1

			1	2	3
1	(Spain) (Indonesia)	María José Llorca; Yayuk Basuki	2; 6	7^{8} 6^{6}	6; 3
2	(Spain) (Indonesia)	Arantxa Sánchez Vicario; Suzanna Anggarkusuma	7^{7} 6^{2}	6; 3
3	(Spain) (Indonesia)	Ana Almansa / Arantxa Sánchez Vicario; Suzanna Anggarkusuma / Yayuk Basuki	5; 7	4; 6

==== China vs. United States ====
China
0
I. Czech Lawn Tennis Club, Prague, Czechoslovakia
July 1986
Red clay (outdoors)

United States
3

			1	2	3
1	(China) (United States)	Zhong Ni; Zina Garrison	3; 6	2; 6
2	(China) (United States)	Li Xinyi; Martina Navratilova	1; 6	0; 6
3	(China) (United States)	Duan Li-Lan / Pu Xin-Fen; Martina Navratilova / Pam Shriver	2; 6	0; 6

=== Second round ===
==== Czechoslovakia vs. Switzerland ====
Czechoslovakia
3
I. Czech Lawn Tennis Club, Prague, Czechoslovakia
July 1986
Red clay (outdoors)

Switzerland
0

			1	2	3
1	(Czechoslovakia) (Switzerland)	Helena Suková; Céline Cohen	6; 1	6; 2
2	(Czechoslovakia) (Switzerland)	Hana Mandlíková; Christiane Jolissaint	6; 4	6; 1
3	(Czechoslovakia) (Switzerland)	Andrea Holíková / Regina Maršíková; Céline Cohen / Christiane Jolissaint	6; 4	1; 6	9; 7

==== Denmark vs. Australia ====
Denmark
1
I. Czech Lawn Tennis Club, Prague, Czechoslovakia
July 1986
Red clay (outdoors)

Australia
2

			1	2	3
1	(Denmark) (Australia)	Lone Vandborg; Anne Minter	1; 6	1; 6
2	(Denmark) (Australia)	Tine Scheuer-Larsen; Elizabeth Smylie	6; 1	6; 0
3	(Denmark) (Australia)	Anne Møller / Tine Scheuer-Larsen; Elizabeth Smylie / Wendy Turnbull	2; 6	7; 5	1; 6

==== Canada vs. Austria ====
Canada
0
I. Czech Lawn Tennis Club, Prague, Czechoslovakia
July 1986
Red clay (outdoors)

Austria
3

			1	2	3
1	(Canada) (Austria)	Helen Kelesi; Judith Wiesner	2; 6	3; 6
2	(Canada) (Austria)	Carling Bassett; Petra Huber	6; 2	3; 6	4; 6
3	(Canada) (Austria)	Jill Hetherington / Jane Young; Petra Huber / Judith Wiesner	2; 6	6^{5} 7^{7}

==== South Korea vs. Argentina ====
South Korea
1
I. Czech Lawn Tennis Club, Prague, Czechoslovakia
July 1986
Red clay (outdoors)

Argentina
2

			1	2	3
1	(South Korea) (Argentina)	Lee Jeong-soon; Mercedes Paz	7^{7} 6^{4}	6; 2
2	(South Korea) (Argentina)	Kim Soo-ok; Gabriela Sabatini	5; 7	2; 6
3	(South Korea) (Argentina)	Lee Jeong-soon / Park Jeom-re; Mercedes Paz / Gabriela Sabatini	5; 7	0; 6

==== Bulgaria vs. France ====
Bulgaria
2
I. Czech Lawn Tennis Club, Prague, Czechoslovakia
July 1986
Red clay (outdoors)

France
1

			1	2	3
1	(Bulgaria) (France)	Katerina Maleeva; Nathalie Tauziat	7^{7} 6^{5}	7^{8} 6^{6}
2	(Bulgaria) (France)	Manuela Maleeva; Catherine Tanvier	6; 0	6; 1
3	(Bulgaria) (France)	Yuliya Berberyan-Maleeva / Dora Rangelova; Isabelle Demongeot / Pascale Paradis	3; 6	1; 6

==== Brazil vs. West Germany ====
Brazil
1
I. Czech Lawn Tennis Club, Prague, Czechoslovakia
July 1986
Red clay (outdoors)

West Germany
2

			1	2	3
1	(Brazil) (West Germany)	Niege Dias; Claudia Kohde-Kilsch	6; 2	6; 4
2	(Brazil) (West Germany)	Patricia Medrado; Steffi Graf	0; 6	2; 6
3	(Brazil) (West Germany)	Niege Dias / Patricia Medrado; Bettina Bunge / Steffi Graf	2; 6	1; 6

==== Italy vs. Yugoslavia ====
Italy
2
I. Czech Lawn Tennis Club, Prague, Czechoslovakia
July 1986
Red clay (outdoors)

Yugoslavia
1

			1	2	3
1	(Italy) (Socialist Federal Republic of Yugoslavia)	Sandra Cecchini; Karmen Škulj	6^{6} 7^{8}	7^{8} 6^{6}	6; 3
2	(Italy) (Socialist Federal Republic of Yugoslavia)	Raffaella Reggi; Sabrina Goleš	6; 4	7; 5
3	(Italy) (Socialist Federal Republic of Yugoslavia)	Laura Garrone / Raffaella Reggi; Sabrina Goleš / Aila Winkler	6; 3	6^{4} 7^{7}	3; 6

==== Spain vs. United States ====
Spain
0
I. Czech Lawn Tennis Club, Prague, Czechoslovakia
July 1986
Red clay (outdoors)

United States
3

			1	2	3
1	(Spain) (United States)	María José Llorca; Chris Evert Lloyd	1; 6	0; 6
2	(Spain) (United States)	Arantxa Sánchez Vicario; Martina Navratilova	3; 6	0; 6
3	(Spain) (United States)	Ana Almansa / María José Llorca; Martina Navratilova / Pam Shriver	0; 6	1; 6

=== Quarterfinals ===
==== Czechoslovakia vs. Australia ====
Czechoslovakia
3
I. Czech Lawn Tennis Club, Prague, Czechoslovakia
July 1986
Red clay (outdoors)

Australia
0

			1	2	3
1	(Czechoslovakia) (Australia)	Helena Suková; Anne Minter	6; 4	3; 6	6; 4
2	(Czechoslovakia) (Australia)	Hana Mandlíková; Wendy Turnbull	6; 1	3; 6	6; 1
3	(Czechoslovakia) (Australia)	Andrea Holíková / Regina Maršíková; Elizabeth Smylie / Janine Tremelling	6; 4	6; 3

==== Austria vs. Argentina ====
Austria
0
I. Czech Lawn Tennis Club, Prague, Czechoslovakia
July 1986
Red clay (outdoors)

Argentina
3

			1	2	3
1	(Austria) (Argentina)	Judith Wiesner; Mercedes Paz	4; 6	2; 6
2	(Austria) (Argentina)	Petra Huber; Gabriela Sabatini	2; 6	7; 5	4; 6
3	(Austria) (Argentina)	Petra Huber / Judith Wiesner; Mercedes Paz / Gabriela Sabatini	1; 6	3; 6

==== Bulgaria vs. West Germany ====
Bulgaria
1
I. Czech Lawn Tennis Club, Prague, Czechoslovakia
July 1986
Red clay (outdoors)

West Germany
2

			1	2	3
1	(Bulgaria) (West Germany)	Katerina Maleeva; Bettina Bunge	6; 2	3; 6	3; 6
2	(Bulgaria) (West Germany)	Manuela Maleeva; Claudia Kohde-Kilsch	6; 4	6; 2
3	(Bulgaria) (West Germany)	Katerina Maleeva / Manuela Maleeva; Bettina Bunge / Claudia Kohde-Kilsch	4; 6	2; 6

==== Italy vs. United States ====
Italy
1
I. Czech Lawn Tennis Club, Prague, Czechoslovakia
July 1986
Red clay (outdoors)

United States
2

			1	2	3
1	(Italy) (United States)	Sandra Cecchini; Chris Evert Lloyd	3; 6	6; 4	6; 3
2	(Italy) (United States)	Raffaella Reggi; Martina Navratilova	2; 6	4; 6
3	(Italy) (United States)	Laura Garrone / Raffaella Reggi; Martina Navratilova / Pam Shriver	3; 6	1; 6

=== Semifinals ===
==== Czechoslovakia vs. Argentina ====
Czechoslovakia
2
I. Czech Lawn Tennis Club, Prague, Czechoslovakia
July 1986
Red clay (outdoors)

Argentina
1

			1	2	3
1	(Czechoslovakia) (Argentina)	Helena Suková; Mercedes Paz	1; 6	6; 3	6; 3
2	(Czechoslovakia) (Argentina)	Hana Mandlíková-Sedlakova; Gabriela Sabatini	6; 2	6; 4
3	(Czechoslovakia) (Argentina)	Andrea Holíková / Regina Maršíková; Mercedes Paz / Gabriela Sabatini	7^{7} 6^{5}	2; 6	2; 6

==== West Germany vs. United States ====
West Germany
0
I. Czech Lawn Tennis Club, Prague, Czechoslovakia
July 1986
Red clay (outdoors)

United States
3

			1	2	3
1	(West Germany) (United States)	Bettina Bunge; Chris Evert-Lloyd	3; 6	4; 6
2	(West Germany) (United States)	Claudia Kohde-Kilsch; Martina Navratilova	1; 6	4; 6
3	(West Germany) (United States)	Bettina Bunge / Claudia Porwik; Martina Navratilova / Pam Shriver	2; 6	3; 6

=== Final ===
==== Czechoslovakia vs. United States ====
Czechoslovakia
0
I. Czech Lawn Tennis Club, Prague, Czechoslovakia
27 July 1986
Red clay (outdoors)

United States
3

			1	2	3
1	(Czechoslovakia) (United States)	Helena Suková; Chris Evert Lloyd	5; 7	6^{5} 7^{7}
2	(Czechoslovakia) (United States)	Hana Mandlíková; Martina Navratilova	5; 7	1; 6
3	(Czechoslovakia) (United States)	Hana Mandlíková / Helena Suková; Martina Navratilova / Pam Shriver	4; 6	2; 6

1986 Federation Cup Champions
(United States)
United States
Twelfth title

== Consolation rounds ==
=== Draw ===
Consolation first round
Chile	0
Romania	3
Norway	1
Ireland	2
Philippines	0
China	3
Luxembourg	2
Mexico	1
Poland	0
Hungary	3
Uruguay	2
Chinese Taipei	1
Belgium	3
Egypt	0
Malta	1
Indonesia	2
Israel	1
Finland	2

Consolation second round
Soviet Union	3
Romania	0
Greece	3
Ireland	0
Japan	2
China	1
Netherlands	3
Luxembourg	0
Hungary	3
Uruguay	0
Belgium	3
Sweden	0
Indonesia	2
New Zealand	1
Finland	0
Great Britain	3

Consolation quarterfinals
Soviet Union	3
Greece	0
Japan	1
Netherlands	2
Hungary	2
Belgium	1
Indonesia	0
Great Britain	3

Consolation semifinals
Soviet Union	2
Netherlands	1
Hungary	0
Great Britain	3

Consolation final
Soviet Union	1
Great Britain	2

=== First round ===
==== Chile vs. Romania ====
Chile
0
I. Czech Lawn Tennis Club, Prague, Czechoslovakia
July 1986
Red clay (outdoors)

Romania
3

			1	2	3
1	(Chile) (Romania)	Natalie Rodríguez; Florentina Curpene	2; 6	1; 6
2	(Chile) (Romania)	Paulina Sepúlveda; Daniela Moise	5; 7	4; 6
3	(Chile) (Romania)	Macarena Miranda / Natalie Rodríguez; Daniela Moise / Teodora Tache	3; 6	4; 6

==== Norway vs. Ireland ====
Norway
1
I. Czech Lawn Tennis Club, Prague, Czechoslovakia
July 1986
Red clay (outdoors)

Ireland
2

			1	2	3
1	(Norway) (Republic of Ireland)	Astrid Sunde; Siobhán Nicholson	6; 1	6; 4
2	(Norway) (Republic of Ireland)	Amy Jönsson Raaholt; Jennifer Thornton	3; 6	6; 3	4; 6
3	(Norway) (Republic of Ireland)	Amy Jönsson Raaholt / Astrid Sunde; Siobhán Nicholson / Lesley O'Halloran	4; 6	1; 6

==== Philippines vs. China ====
Philippines
0
I. Czech Lawn Tennis Club, Prague, Czechoslovakia
July 1986
Red clay (outdoors)

China
3

			1	2	3
1	(Philippines) (China)	Jennifer Saberon; Zhong Ni	4; 6	0; 6
2	(Philippines) (China)	Dyan Castillejo; Li Xinyi	7; 5	2; 6	4; 6
3	(Philippines) (China)	Dyan Castillejo / Jennifer Saberon; Duan Li-Lan / Pu Xin-Fen	3; 6	0; 6

==== Luxembourg vs. Mexico ====
Luxembourg
2
I. Czech Lawn Tennis Club, Prague, Czechoslovakia
July 1986
Red clay (outdoors)

Mexico
1

			1	2	3
1	(Luxembourg) (Mexico)	Ginette Huberty; Mónica Muñoz	1; 6	7; 5	6; 4
2	(Luxembourg) (Mexico)	Karin Kschwendt; Claudia Hernández	6; 3	6; 4
3	(Luxembourg) (Mexico)	Ginette Huberty / Pascale Welter; Zarina Galván / Claudia Hernández	3; 6	6^{3} 7^{7}

==== Poland vs. Hungary ====
Poland
0
I. Czech Lawn Tennis Club, Prague, Czechoslovakia
July 1986
Red clay (outdoors)

Hungary
3

			1	2	3
1	(Poland) (Hungary)	Renata Skrzypczyńska; Réka Szikszay	4; 6	4; 6
2	(Poland) (Hungary)	Monika Waniek; Csilla Cserépy	2; 6	3; 6
3	(Poland) (Hungary)	Monika Waniek / Ewa Zerdecka; Csilla Cserépy / Réka Szikszay	4; 6	0; 6

==== Uruguay vs. Chinese Taipei ====
Uruguay
2
I. Czech Lawn Tennis Club, Prague, Czechoslovakia
July 1986
Red clay (outdoors)

Chinese Taipei
1

			1	2	3
1	(Uruguay) (Chinese Taipei)	Silvana Casaretto; Lai Su-lin	2; 6	3; 6
2	(Uruguay) (Chinese Taipei)	Fiorella Bonicelli; Ho Chiu-mei	6; 4	6; 0
3	(Uruguay) (Chinese Taipei)	Fiorella Bonicelli / Silvana Casaretto; Lai Su-jen / Lai Su-lin	6; 4	4; 6	6; 1

==== Belgium vs. Egypt ====
Belgium
3
I. Czech Lawn Tennis Club, Prague, Czechoslovakia
July 1986
Red clay (outdoors)

Egypt
0

			1	2	3
1	(Belgium) (Egypt)	Sandra Wasserman; Shahira Tawfik	6; 0	6; 1
2	(Belgium) (Egypt)	Ann Devries; Anjy Fahmy	6; 2	6; 1
3	(Belgium) (Egypt)	Ann Devries / Sandra Wasserman; Anjy Fahmy / Nahla Mohammed	6; 0	6; 0

==== Malta vs. Indonesia ====
Malta
2
I. Czech Lawn Tennis Club, Prague, Czechoslovakia
July 1986
Red clay (outdoors)

Indonesia
1

			1	2	3
1	(Malta) (Indonesia)	Alexia Gera; Yayuk Basuki	4; 6	1; 6
2	(Malta) (Indonesia)	Carol Cassar-Torreggiani; Suzanna Anggarkusuma	0; 6	3; 6
3	(Malta) (Indonesia)	Katherine Camilleri / Alexia Gera; Suzanna Anggarkusuma / Sri Utaminingsih	6; 3	2; 6	7; 5

==== Israel vs. Finland ====
Israel
1
I. Czech Lawn Tennis Club, Prague, Czechoslovakia
July 1986
Red clay (outdoors)

Finland
2

			1	2	3
1	(Israel) (Finland)	Dalia Koriat; Maija Suonpää	6; 0	6; 3
2	(Israel) (Finland)	Ilana Berger; Petra Thorén	1; 6	2; 6
3	(Israel) (Finland)	Ilana Berger / Dalia Koriat; Maija Suonpää / Petra Thorén	6; 3	4; 6	2; 6

=== Second round ===
==== Soviet Union vs. Romania ====
Soviet Union
3
I. Czech Lawn Tennis Club, Prague, Czechoslovakia
July 1986
Red clay (outdoors)

Romania
0

			1	2	3
1	(Soviet Union) (Romania)	Natalia Egorova; Florentina Curpene	6; 1	3; 6	9; 7
2	(Soviet Union) (Romania)	Larisa Savchenko; Daniela Moise	6; 1	6; 3
3	(Soviet Union) (Romania)	Svetlana Cherneva / Natasha Zvereva; Daniela Moise / Teodora Tache	6; 3	7^{7} 6^{0}

==== Greece vs. Ireland ====
Greece
3
I. Czech Lawn Tennis Club, Prague, Czechoslovakia
July 1986
Red clay (outdoors)

Ireland
0

			1	2	3
1	(Greece) (Republic of Ireland)	Olga Tsarbopoulou; Rhona Howett	6; 0	6; 4
2	(Greece) (Republic of Ireland)	Angeliki Kanellopoulou; Lesley O'Halloran	6; 3	6; 3
3	(Greece) (Republic of Ireland)	Xenia Anastasiados / Angeliki Kanellopoulou; Rhona Howett / Lesley O'Halloran	1; 6	7^{7} 6^{3}	6; 3

==== Japan vs. China ====
Japan
2
I. Czech Lawn Tennis Club, Prague, Czechoslovakia
July 1986
Red clay (outdoors)

China
1

			1	2	3
1	(Japan) (China)	Akiko Kijimuta; Duan Li-Lan	6; 2	6; 1
2	(Japan) (China)	Etsuko Inoue; Li Xinyi	2; 6	4; 6
3	(Japan) (China)	Etsuko Inoue / Masako Yanagi; Duan Li-Lan / Pu Xin-Fen	6; 4	6; 3

==== Netherlands vs. Luxembourg ====
Netherlands
3
I. Czech Lawn Tennis Club, Prague, Czechoslovakia
July 1986
Red clay (outdoors)

Luxembourg
0

			1	2	3
1	(Netherlands) (Luxembourg)	Hellas ter Riet; Ginette Huberty	6; 0	6; 2
2	(Netherlands) (Luxembourg)	Nanette Schutte; Karin Kschwendt	4; 6	6; 4	6; 3
3	(Netherlands) (Luxembourg)	Hellas ter Riet / Marianne van der Torre; Ginette Huberty / Karin Kschwendt	6; 3	6; 1

==== Hungary vs. Uruguay ====
Hungary
3
I. Czech Lawn Tennis Club, Prague, Czechoslovakia
July 1986
Red clay (outdoors)

Uruguay
0

			1	2	3
1	(Hungary) (Uruguay)	Réka Szikszay; Silvana Casaretto	6; 2	6; 1
2	(Hungary) (Uruguay)	Csilla Cserépy; Fiorella Bonicelli	6; 0	6; 3
3	(Hungary) (Uruguay)	Csilla Cserépy / Réka Szikszay; Fiorella Bonicelli / Silvana Casaretto	6; 1	6; 1

==== Belgium vs. Sweden ====
Belgium
3
I. Czech Lawn Tennis Club, Prague, Czechoslovakia
July 1986
Red clay (outdoors)

Sweden
0

			1	2	3
1	(Belgium) (Sweden)	Sandra Wasserman; Monica Lundqvist	7; 5	6; 3
2	(Belgium) (Sweden)	Ann Devries; Helena Dahlström	6; 4	6; 2
3	(Belgium) (Sweden)	Ann Devries / Sandra Wasserman; Helena Dahlström / Monica Lundqvist	6; 4	6; 2

==== Indonesia vs. New Zealand ====
Indonesia
2
I. Czech Lawn Tennis Club, Prague, Czechoslovakia
July 1986
Red clay (outdoors)

New Zealand
1

			1	2	3
1	(Indonesia) (New Zealand)	Yayuk Basuki; Julie Richardson	6; 3	6; 0
2	(Indonesia) (New Zealand)	Suzanna Anggarkusuma; Belinda Cordwell	6; 3	6; 3
3	(Indonesia) (New Zealand)	Yayuk Basuki / Sri Utaminingsih; Belinda Cordwell / Julie Richardson	6^{4} 7^{7}	6^{8} 7^{10}

==== Finland vs. Great Britain ====
Finland
0
I. Czech Lawn Tennis Club, Prague, Czechoslovakia
July 1986
Red clay (outdoors)

Great Britain
3

			1	2	3
1	(Finland) (United Kingdom)	Maija Suonpää; Anne Hobbs	2; 6	0; 6
2	(Finland) (United Kingdom)	Petra Thorén; Annabel Croft	4; 6	6; 3	4; 6
3	(Finland) (United Kingdom)	Maija Suonpää / Petra Thorén; Annabel Croft / Anne Hobbs	0; 6	1; 6

=== Quarterfinals ===
==== Soviet Union vs. Greece ====
Soviet Union
3
I. Czech Lawn Tennis Club, Prague, Czechoslovakia
July 1986
Red clay (outdoors)

Greece
0

			1	2	3
1	(Soviet Union) (Greece)	Natasha Zvereva; Olga Tsarbopoulou	6; 1	6; 1
2	(Soviet Union) (Greece)	Larisa Savchenko; Angeliki Kanellopoulou	6; 2	7; 5
3	(Soviet Union) (Greece)	Svetlana Cherneva / Larisa Savchenko; Angeliki Kanellopoulou / Olga Tsarbopoulou	5; 0			retired

==== Japan vs. Netherlands ====
Japan
1
I. Czech Lawn Tennis Club, Prague, Czechoslovakia
July 1986
Red clay (outdoors)

Netherlands
2

			1	2	3
1	(Japan) (Netherlands)	Akiko Kijimuta; Hellas ter Riet	3; 6	2; 6
2	(Japan) (Netherlands)	Etsuko Inoue; Marianne van der Torre	2; 6	6; 3	6; 2
3	(Japan) (Netherlands)	Etsuko Inoue / Masako Yanagi; Hellas ter Riet / Marianne van der Torre	4; 6	3; 6

==== Hungary vs. Belgium ====
Hungary
2
I. Czech Lawn Tennis Club, Prague, Czechoslovakia
July 1986
Red clay (outdoors)

Belgium
1

			1	2	3
1	(Hungary) (Belgium)	Réka Szikszay; Sandra Wasserman	2; 6	1; 6
2	(Hungary) (Belgium)	Csilla Cserépy; Ann Devries	6; 1	1; 6	6; 1
3	(Hungary) (Belgium)	Csilla Cserépy / Réka Szikszay; Ann Devries / Sandra Wasserman	4; 6	6; 1	6; 0

==== Indonesia vs. Great Britain ====
Indonesia
0
I. Czech Lawn Tennis Club, Prague, Czechoslovakia
July 1986
Red clay (outdoors)

Great Britain
3

			1	2	3
1	(Indonesia) (United Kingdom)	Yayuk Basuki; Anne Hobbs	5; 7	5; 7
2	(Indonesia) (United Kingdom)	Suzanna Anggarkusuma; Annabel Croft	2; 6	6; 2	2; 6
3	(Indonesia) (United Kingdom)	Suzanna Anggarkusuma / Yayuk Basuki; Annabel Croft / Anne Hobbs	2; 6	6; 4	2; 6

=== Semifinals ===
==== Soviet Union vs. Netherlands ====
Soviet Union
2
I. Czech Lawn Tennis Club, Prague, Czechoslovakia
July 1986
Red clay (outdoors)

Netherlands
1

			1	2	3
1	(Soviet Union) (Netherlands)	Natasha Zvereva; Hellas ter Riet	6; 2	3; 6	3; 6
2	(Soviet Union) (Netherlands)	Larisa Savchenko; Marianne van der Torre	6; 1	6; 0
3	(Soviet Union) (Netherlands)	Svetlana Cherneva / Larisa Savchenko; Hellas ter Riet / Marianne van der Torre	6^{7} 7^{9}	6; 1	6; 1

==== Hungary vs. Great Britain ====
Hungary
0
I. Czech Lawn Tennis Club, Prague, Czechoslovakia
July 1986
Red clay (outdoors)

Great Britain
3

			1	2	3
1	(Hungary) (United Kingdom)	Réka Szikszay; Anne Hobbs	3; 6	2; 6
2	(Hungary) (United Kingdom)	Csilla Cserépy; Annabel Croft	4; 6	2; 6
3	(Hungary) (United Kingdom)	Csilla Cserépy / Réka Szikszay; Annabel Croft / Anne Hobbs	1; 2			retired

=== Final ===
==== Soviet Union vs. Great Britain ====
Soviet Union
1
I. Czech Lawn Tennis Club, Prague, Czechoslovakia
July 1986
Red clay (outdoors)

Great Britain
2

			1	2	3
1	(Soviet Union) (United Kingdom)	Natasha Zvereva; Anne Hobbs	3; 6	5; 7
2	(Soviet Union) (United Kingdom)	Larisa Savchenko; Annabel Croft	4; 6	0; 6
3	(Soviet Union) (United Kingdom)	Natalia Egorova / Svetlana Cherneva; Annabel Croft / Anne Hobbs	6; 2	6; 1
