= 1988 Vitosha New Otani Open – Singles =

Singles
- 1988 Vitosha New Otani Open

Final
- Champion: (Spain) Conchita Martínez
- Runner-up: (Austria) Barbara Paulus
- Score: 6–1, 6–2

Events
Singles	Doubles
← 1987 ·	Vitosha New Otani Open	· 1989 →

Conchita Martínez won in the final 6–1, 6–2 against Barbara Paulus.

== Seeds ==
A champion seed is indicated in bold text while text in italics indicates the round in which that seed was eliminated.

1. (Bulgaria) Katerina Maleeva (semifinals)
2. (Austria) Barbara Paulus (final)
3. (Socialist Federal Republic of Yugoslavia) Sabrina Goleš (quarterfinals)
4. (Greece) Angeliki Kanellopoulou (first round)
5. (Belgium) Sandra Wasserman (quarterfinals)
6. (Spain) **Conchita Martínez (champion)**
7. (Belgium) Ann Devries (semifinals)
8. (Czechoslovakia) Iva Budařová (quarterfinals)

== Draw ==
=== Key ===
- Q = Qualifier
- WC = Wild card
- LL = Lucky loser
- Alt = Alternate
- SE = Special exempt
- PR = Protected ranking
- ITF = ITF entry
- JE = Junior exempt
- w/o = Walkover
- r = Retired
- d = Defaulted
- SR = Special ranking

First round
1	(Bulgaria) **K Maleeva**	**6**	**7**
(Sweden) M Strandlund	1	6
(Switzerland) **M Strebel**	**6**	**6**
(United Kingdom) J Salmon	1	2
(Austria) **H Sprung**	**6**	**6**
(United States) E Raponi-Longo	0	2
(Greece) O Tsarbopoulou	3	2
8	(Czechoslovakia) **I Budařová**	**6**	**6**
3	(Socialist Federal Republic of Yugoslavia) **S Goleš**	**6**	**6**
(Bulgaria) D Rangelova	4	2
(France) **V Paquet**	**7**	**6**
(Austria) P Huber	5	3
(West Germany) **V Martinek**	2	**6**	**6**
(Sweden) J Jonerup	**6**	3	3
(Bulgaria) R Milorieva	0	0
6	(Spain) **C Martínez**	**6**	**6**
7	(Belgium) **A Devries**	**6**	3	**6**
(Austria) B Diesner	2	**6**	2
(West Germany) **S Frankl**	**6**	**6**
(West Germany) A Betzner	4	4
(Czechoslovakia) R Maršíková	2	3
(France) **M-C Damas**	**6**	**6**
(Czechoslovakia) **H Fukárková**	2	**6**	**6**
4	(Greece) A Kanellopoulou	**6**	1	4
5	(Belgium) **S Wasserman**	**6**	4	**6**
(Sweden) H Dahlström	0	**6**	3
(United Kingdom) **S Loosemore**	2	**6**	**6**
(West Germany) C Hofmann	**6**	1	4
(West Germany) **S Hack**	**6**	2	**6**
(Argentina) A Tiezzi	4	**6**	3
(Czechoslovakia) D Krajčovičová	6	2
2	(Austria) **B Paulus**	**7**	**6**

Second round
1	(Bulgaria) **K Maleeva**	**6**	**6**
(Switzerland) M Strebel	0	1
(Austria) H Sprung	6	5
8	(Czechoslovakia) **I Budařová**	**7**	**7**
3	(Socialist Federal Republic of Yugoslavia) **S Goleš**	**6**	**6**
(France) V Paquet	1	3
(West Germany) V Martinek	2	2
6	(Spain) **C Martínez**	**6**	**6**
7	(Belgium) **A Devries**	0	**6**	**6**
(West Germany) S Frankl	**6**	1	4
(France) M-C Damas	6	**6**	2
(Czechoslovakia) **H Fukárková**	**7**	3	**6**
5	(Belgium) **S Wasserman**	**6**	**6**
(United Kingdom) S Loosemore	4	3
(West Germany) S Hack	1	0
2	(Austria) **B Paulus**	**6**	**6**

Quarterfinals
1	(Bulgaria) **K Maleeva**	5	**6**	**6**
8	(Czechoslovakia) I Budařová	**7**	4	3
3	(Socialist Federal Republic of Yugoslavia) S Goleš	6	2
6	(Spain) **C Martínez**	**7**	**6**
7	(Belgium) **A Devries**	**6**	**6**
(Czechoslovakia) H Fukárková	2	2
5	(Belgium) S Wasserman	3	**6**	4
2	(Austria) **B Paulus**	**6**	4	**6**

Semifinals
1	(Bulgaria) K Maleeva	6	2
6	(Spain) **C Martínez**	**7**	**6**
7	(Belgium) A Devries	**7**	1	2
2	(Austria) **B Paulus**	6	**6**	**6**

Final
6	(Spain) **Conchita Martínez**	**6**	**6**
2	(Austria) Barbara Paulus	1	2
