= 1985 Federation Cup (tennis) =

International women's tennis competition

Details
- Duration: 6–14 October
- Edition: 23rd

Champion
- Winning nation: Czechoslovakia

The 1985 Federation Cup was the 23rd edition of the most important competition between national teams in women's tennis. The tournament was held at the Nagoya Green Tennis Club in Nagoya, Japan, from 6–14 October. Czechoslovakia defeated the United States in the final, giving Czechoslovakia their 4th and 3rd consecutive title.

== Qualifying round ==
All ties were played at the Nagoya Green Tennis Club in Nagoya, Japan, on hard courts.

Winning team	Score	Losing team
South Korea	2–1	Philippines
Chinese Taipei	2–1	Finland
China	2–1	Indonesia
Norway	2–1	Chile
Ireland	3–0	Thailand
Belgium	3–0	Uruguay

Winning nations advance to Main Draw, losing nations play in Consolation rounds.

=== South Korea vs. Philippines ===
South Korea
2
Nagoya Green Tennis Club, Nagoya, Japan
October 1985
Hard (outdoor)

Philippines
1

			1	2	3
1	(South Korea) (Philippines)	Lee Jeong-soon; Jennifer Saberon	6; 3	6; 2
2	(South Korea) (Philippines)	Seol Min-kyung; Dyan Castillejo	4; 6	4; 6
3	(South Korea) (Philippines)	Choi Jeong-ok / Kim Soo-ok; Dyan Castillejo / Jennifer Saberon	6; 2	6; 2

=== Chinese Taipei vs. Finland ===
Chinese Taipei
2
Nagoya Green Tennis Club, Nagoya, Japan
October 1985
Hard (outdoor)

Finland
1

			1	2	3
1	(Chinese Taipei) (Finland)	Lai Su-lin; Anne Happonen	2; 6	7; 5	6; 3
2	(Chinese Taipei) (Finland)	Ho Chiu-mei; Anne Aallonen	6; 2	2; 6	5; 7
3	(Chinese Taipei) (Finland)	Lai Su-lin / Wen Hsiu-tsuan; Anne Aallonen / Anne Happonen	6; 3	6^{4} 7^{7}	9; 7

=== China vs. Indonesia ===
China
2
Nagoya Green Tennis Club, Nagoya, Japan
October 1985
Hard (outdoor)

Indonesia
1

			1	2	3
1	(China) (Indonesia)	Zhong Ni; Yayuk Basuki	6; 1	1; 6	6; 2
2	(China) (Indonesia)	Li Xinyi; Suzanna Anggarkusuma	0; 6	6; 4	6; 2
3	(China) (Indonesia)	Pu Xin-Fen / Weng Qin-Di; Suzanna Anggarkusuma / Yayuk Basuki	1; 6	5; 7

=== Norway vs. Chile ===
Norway
2
Nagoya Green Tennis Club, Nagoya, Japan
October 1985
Hard (outdoor)

Chile
1

			1	2	3
1	(Norway) (Chile)	Amy Jönsson Raaholt; Natalie Rodríguez	4; 6	6; 4	6; 3
2	(Norway) (Chile)	Astrid Sunde; Paulina Sepúlveda	6; 3	4; 6	2; 6
3	(Norway) (Chile)	Amy Jönsson Raaholt / Astrid Sunde; Paulina Rodríguez / Paulina Sepúlveda	6; 3	3; 6	6; 1

=== Ireland vs. Thailand ===
Ireland
3
Nagoya Green Tennis Club, Nagoya, Japan
October 1985
Hard (outdoor)

Thailand
0

			1	2	3
1	(Republic of Ireland) (Thailand)	Jennifer Thornton; Chalada Wattana	6^{5} 7^{7}	7; 5	7; 5
2	(Republic of Ireland) (Thailand)	Siobhán Nicholson; Voralak Wichienchai	6; 1	6; 1
3	(Republic of Ireland) (Thailand)	Diane Craig / Siobhán Nicholson; Ponamporn Samawanthana / Chalada Wattana	6; 2	6; 4

=== Belgium vs. Uruguay ===
Belgium
3
Nagoya Green Tennis Club, Nagoya, Japan
October 1985
Hard (outdoor)

Uruguay
0

			1	2	3
1	(Belgium) (Uruguay)	Kathleen Schuurmans; Liliana Rodríguez	6; 0	6; 1
2	(Belgium) (Uruguay)	Sandra Wasserman; Claudia van der Weck	6; 3	6; 0
3	(Belgium) (Uruguay)	Ilse de Ruysscher / Ann Devries; Mariela Clavijo / Claudia van der Weck	6; 0	6; 2

== Main draw ==
Participating Teams
Argentina	Australia	Austria	Belgium	Brazil	Bulgaria	Canada	China
Chinese Taipei	Czechoslovakia	Denmark	France	Great Britain	Greece	Hong Kong	Hungary
Ireland	Italy	Japan	Mexico	Netherlands	New Zealand	Norway	Peru
South Korea	Soviet Union	Spain	Sweden	Switzerland	United States	West Germany	Yugoslavia

First Round
Czechoslovakia	2
Greece	1
Netherlands	1
Switzerland	2
Q	Belgium	0
Hungary	3
Canada	2
Sweden	1
West Germany	0
Great Britain	3
Austria	0
Japan	3
Bulgaria	3
Soviet Union	0
Q	Ireland	0
Yugoslavia	3
United States	3
Q	South Korea	0
Brazil	1
Q	China	2
Argentina	3
Peru	0
New Zealand	2
France	1
Italy	3
Q	Chinese Taipei	0
Mexico	3
Q	Norway	0
Spain	2
Hong Kong	1
Denmark	0
Australia	3

Second Round
Czechoslovakia	2
Switzerland	1
Hungary	2
Canada	1
Great Britain	2
Japan	1
Bulgaria	3
Yugoslavia	0
United States	3
Q	China	0
Argentina	2
New Zealand	1
Italy	3
Mexico	0
Spain	0
Australia	3

Quarterfinals
Czechoslovakia	3
Hungary	0
Great Britain	1
Bulgaria	2
United States	2
Argentina	1
Italy	0
Australia	3

Semifinals
Czechoslovakia	2
Bulgaria	1
United States	2
Australia	1

Final
Czechoslovakia	2
United States	1

1st Round losing teams play in Consolation rounds

=== First round ===
==== Czechoslovakia vs. Greece ====
Czechoslovakia
2
Nagoya Green Tennis Club, Nagoya, Japan
October 1985
Hard (outdoor)

Greece
1

			1	2	3
1	(Czechoslovakia) (Greece)	Helena Suková; Olga Tsarbopoulou	6; 1	6; 4
2	(Czechoslovakia) (Greece)	Hana Mandlíková; Angeliki Kanellopoulou	6; 2	6; 0
3	(Czechoslovakia) (Greece)	Andrea Holíková / Regina Maršíková; Angeliki Kanellopoulou / Olga Tsarbopoulou	3; 6	2; 6

==== Netherlands vs. Switzerland ====
Netherlands
1
Nagoya Green Tennis Club, Nagoya, Japan
October 1985
Hard (outdoor)

Switzerland
2

			1	2	3
1	(Netherlands) (Switzerland)	Nanette Schutte; Lilian Drescher	2; 6	6^{4} 7^{7}
2	(Netherlands) (Switzerland)	Marcella Mesker; Christiane Jolissaint	6; 3	4; 6	6; 4
3	(Netherlands) (Switzerland)	Marcella Mesker / Nanette Schutte; Lilian Drescher / Christiane Jolissaint	3; 6	2; 6

==== Belgium vs. Hungary ====
Belgium
0
Nagoya Green Tennis Club, Nagoya, Japan
October 1985
Hard (outdoor)

Hungary
3

			1	2	3
1	(Belgium) (Hungary)	Sandra Wasserman; Csilla Cserépy	3; 6	6^{7} 7^{9}
2	(Belgium) (Hungary)	Ilse de Ruysscher; Andrea Temesvári	5; 7	3; 6
3	(Belgium) (Hungary)	Ilse de Ruysscher / Kathleen Schuurmans; Csilla Cserépy / Andrea Temesvári	2; 6	2; 6

==== Canada vs. Sweden ====
Canada
2
Nagoya Green Tennis Club, Nagoya, Japan
October 1985
Hard (outdoor)

Sweden
1

			1	2	3
1	(Canada) (Sweden)	Jane Young; Carina Karlsson	7; 5	6; 1
2	(Canada) (Sweden)	Carling Bassett; Catarina Lindqvist	6; 4	6; 3
3	(Canada) (Sweden)	Carling Bassett / Hélène Pelletier; Catarina Lindqvist / Maria Lindström	6; 4	3; 6	4; 6

==== West Germany vs. Great Britain ====
West Germany
0
Nagoya Green Tennis Club, Nagoya, Japan
October 1985
Hard (outdoor)

Great Britain
3

			1	2	3
1	(West Germany) (United Kingdom)	Petra Keppeler; Jo Durie	4; 6	0; 6
2	(West Germany) (United Kingdom)	Myriam Schropp; Annabel Croft	3; 6	1; 6
3	(West Germany) (United Kingdom)	Andrea Betzner / Petra Keppeler; Jo Durie / Anne Hobbs	4; 6	6; 3	1; 6

==== Austria vs. Japan ====
Austria
0
Nagoya Green Tennis Club, Nagoya, Japan
October 1985
Hard (outdoor)

Japan
3

			1	2	3
1	(Austria) (Japan)	Barbara Pollet; Masako Yanagi	4; 6	3; 6
2	(Austria) (Japan)	Petra Huber; Etsuko Inoue	5; 7	7^{7} 6^{3}	2; 6
3	(Austria) (Japan)	Petra Huber / Barbara Pollet; Etsuko Inoue / Masako Yanagi	5; 7	2; 6

==== Bulgaria vs. Soviet Union ====
Bulgaria
3
Nagoya Green Tennis Club, Nagoya, Japan
October 1985
Hard (outdoor)

Soviet Union
0

			1	2	3
1	(Bulgaria) (Soviet Union)	Katerina Maleeva; Elena Eliseenko	6; 4	6; 2
2	(Bulgaria) (Soviet Union)	Manuela Maleeva; Larisa Savchenko	6^{3} 7^{7}	6; 4	6; 1
3	(Bulgaria) (Soviet Union)	Katerina Maleeva / Manuela Maleeva; Natalia Egorova / Svetlana Cherneva	6; 3	7; 5

==== Ireland vs. Yugoslavia ====
Ireland
0
Nagoya Green Tennis Club, Nagoya, Japan
October 1985
Hard (outdoor)

Yugoslavia
3

			1	2	3
1	(Republic of Ireland) (Socialist Federal Republic of Yugoslavia)	Jennifer Thornton; Mima Jaušovec	3; 6	0; 6
2	(Republic of Ireland) (Socialist Federal Republic of Yugoslavia)	Siobhán Nicholson; Sabrina Goleš	6; 4	4; 6	3; 6
3	(Republic of Ireland) (Socialist Federal Republic of Yugoslavia)	Diane Craig / Jennifer Thornton; Sabrina Goleš / Aila Winkler	2; 6	2; 6

==== United States vs. South Korea ====
United States
3
Nagoya Green Tennis Club, Nagoya, Japan
October 1985
Hard (outdoor)

South Korea
0

			1	2	3
1	(United States) (South Korea)	Kathy Jordan; Seol Min-kyung	6; 3	6; 4
2	(United States) (South Korea)	Zina Garrison; Seol Min-kyung	6; 0	6; 0
3	(United States) (South Korea)	Kathy Jordan / Sharon Walsh; Choi Jeong-ok / Lee Jeong-soon	6; 0	6; 0

==== Brazil vs. China ====
Brazil
1
Nagoya Green Tennis Club, Nagoya, Japan
October 1985
Hard (outdoor)

China
2

			1	2	3
1	(Brazil) (China)	Cláudia Monteiro; Zhong Ni	3; 6	4; 6
2	(Brazil) (China)	Niege Dias; Li Xinyi	4; 6	6^{3} 7^{7}
3	(Brazil) (China)	Cláudia Faillace / Cláudia Monteiro; Pu Xin-Fen / Weng Qin-Di	6; 4	6; 2

==== Argentina vs. Peru ====
Argentina
3
Nagoya Green Tennis Club, Nagoya, Japan
October 1985
Hard (outdoor)

Peru
0

			1	2	3
1	(Argentina) (Peru)	Adriana Villagrán; Pilar Vásquez	7^{8} 6^{6}	6^{6} 7^{8}	8; 6
2	(Argentina) (Peru)	Gabriela Sabatini; Laura Gildemeister	6; 3	6; 3
3	(Argentina) (Peru)	Mercedes Paz / Gabriela Sabatini; Laura Gildemeister / Pilar Vásquez	6; 0	7^{7} 6^{3}

==== New Zealand vs. France ====
New Zealand
2
Nagoya Green Tennis Club, Nagoya, Japan
October 1985
Hard (outdoor)

France
1

			1	2	3
1	(New Zealand) (France)	Julie Richardson; Nathalie Tauziat	6; 3	3; 6	2; 6
2	(New Zealand) (France)	Belinda Cordwell; Pascale Paradis	6; 3	6; 2
3	(New Zealand) (France)	Belinda Cordwell / Julie Richardson; Isabelle Demongeot / Nathalie Tauziat	6; 0	7; 5

==== Italy vs. Chinese Taipei ====
Italy
3
Nagoya Green Tennis Club, Nagoya, Japan
October 1985
Hard (outdoor)

Chinese Taipei
0

			1	2	3
1	(Italy) (Chinese Taipei)	Sandra Cecchini; Lai Su-lin	6; 1	6; 0
2	(Italy) (Chinese Taipei)	Raffaella Reggi; Ho Chiu-mei	6; 1	6; 1
3	(Italy) (Chinese Taipei)	Sandra Cecchini / Raffaella Reggi; Lai Su-lin / Wen Hsiu-tsuan	6; 1	6; 0

==== Mexico vs. Norway ====
Mexico
3
Nagoya Green Tennis Club, Nagoya, Japan
October 1985
Hard (outdoor)

Norway
0

			1	2	3
1	(Mexico) (Norway)	Claudia Hernández; Amy Jönsson Raaholt	7^{7} 6^{2}	6; 1
2	(Mexico) (Norway)	Heliane Steden; Astrid Sunde	6; 3	6; 4
3	(Mexico) (Norway)	Maluca Llamas / Heliane Steden; Kjersti Jensen / Amy Jönsson Raaholt	7; 5	6; 3

==== Spain vs. Hong Kong ====
Spain
2
Nagoya Green Tennis Club, Nagoya, Japan
October 1985
Hard (outdoor)

Hong Kong
1

			1	2	3
1	(Spain) (Hong Kong)	Elena Guerra; Paulette Moreno	3; 6	2; 6
2	(Spain) (Hong Kong)	Ana Almansa; Patricia Hy	6; 0	6; 0
3	(Spain) (Hong Kong)	Ana Almansa / Rosa Bielsa; Patricia Hy / Paulette Moreno	3; 6	7^{8} 6^{6}	6; 3

==== Denmark vs. Australia ====
Denmark
0
Nagoya Green Tennis Club, Nagoya, Japan
October 1985
Hard (outdoor)

Australia
3

			1	2	3
1	(Denmark) (Australia)	Anne Møller; Anne Minter	2; 6	2; 6
2	(Denmark) (Australia)	Tine Scheuer-Larsen; Wendy Turnbull	2; 6	6^{6} 7^{8}
3	(Denmark) (Australia)	Anne Møller / Tine Scheuer-Larsen; Elizabeth Smylie / Wendy Turnbull	3; 6	3; 6

=== Second round ===
==== Czechoslovakia vs. Switzerland ====
Czechoslovakia
2
Nagoya Green Tennis Club, Nagoya, Japan
October 1985
Hard (outdoor)

Switzerland
1

			1	2	3
1	(Czechoslovakia) (Switzerland)	Helena Suková; Lilian Drescher	6^{4} 7^{7}	3; 6
2	(Czechoslovakia) (Switzerland)	Hana Mandlíková; Christiane Jolissaint	7^{7} 6^{1}	6; 1
3	(Czechoslovakia) (Switzerland)	Hana Mandlíková / Helena Suková; Lilian Drescher / Christiane Jolissaint	6; 1	6; 2

==== Hungary vs. Canada ====
Hungary
2
Nagoya Green Tennis Club, Nagoya, Japan
October 1985
Hard (outdoor)

Canada
1

			1	2	3
1	(Hungary) (Canada)	Csilla Cserépy; Jane Young	7^{7} 6^{5}	6; 2
2	(Hungary) (Canada)	Andrea Temesvári; Carling Bassett	3; 6	1; 6
3	(Hungary) (Canada)	Csilla Cserépy / Andrea Temesvári; Jill Hetherington / Hélène Pelletier	7; 5	6; 3

==== Great Britain vs. Japan ====
Great Britain
2
Nagoya Green Tennis Club, Nagoya, Japan
October 1985
Hard (outdoor)

Japan
1

			1	2	3
1	(United Kingdom) (Japan)	Anne Hobbs; Masako Yanagi	7; 5	3; 6	2; 6
2	(United Kingdom) (Japan)	Annabel Croft; Etsuko Inoue	7^{9} 6^{7}	6^{4} 7^{7}	6; 3
3	(United Kingdom) (Japan)	Jo Durie / Anne Hobbs; Etsuko Inoue / Masako Yanagi	6^{2} 7^{7}	6; 3	6; 2

==== Bulgaria vs. Yugoslavia ====
Bulgaria
3
Nagoya Green Tennis Club, Nagoya, Japan
October 1985
Hard (outdoor)

Yugoslavia
0

			1	2	3
1	(Bulgaria) (Socialist Federal Republic of Yugoslavia)	Katerina Maleeva; Mima Jaušovec	6; 4	6; 2
2	(Bulgaria) (Socialist Federal Republic of Yugoslavia)	Manuela Maleeva; Sabrina Goleš	6; 1	6; 3
3	(Bulgaria) (Socialist Federal Republic of Yugoslavia)	Katerina Maleeva / Manuela Maleeva; Sabrina Goleš / Aila Winkler	6; 4	7^{9} 6^{7}

==== United States vs. China ====
United States
3
Nagoya Green Tennis Club, Nagoya, Japan
October 1985
Hard (outdoor)

China
0

			1	2	3
1	(United States) (China)	Kathy Jordan; Zhong Ni	6; 1	6; 0
2	(United States) (China)	Zina Garrison; Li Xinyi	6; 0	6; 2
3	(United States) (China)	Kathy Jordan / Sharon Walsh; Li Xinyi / Zhong Ni	6; 2	6; 2

==== Argentina vs. New Zealand ====
Argentina
2
Nagoya Green Tennis Club, Nagoya, Japan
October 1985
Hard (outdoor)

New Zealand
1

			1	2	3
1	(Argentina) (New Zealand)	Mercedes Paz; Julie Richardson	6; 3	6; 4
2	(Argentina) (New Zealand)	Gabriela Sabatini; Belinda Cordwell	6; 1	6; 0
3	(Argentina) (New Zealand)	Gabriela Sabatini / Adriana Villagrán; Belinda Cordwell / Julie Richardson	2; 6	2; 6

==== Italy vs. Mexico ====
Italy
3
Nagoya Green Tennis Club, Nagoya, Japan
October 1985
Hard (outdoor)

Mexico
0

			1	2	3
1	(Italy) (Mexico)	Sandra Cecchini; Claudia Hernández	6; 2	6; 4
2	(Italy) (Mexico)	Raffaella Reggi; Heliane Steden	6; 4	3; 6	7; 5
3	(Italy) (Mexico)	Sandra Cecchini / Laura Garrone; Claudia Hernández / Maluca Llamas	6; 3	6; 3

==== Spain vs. Australia ====
Spain
0
Nagoya Green Tennis Club, Nagoya, Japan
October 1985
Hard (outdoor)

Australia
3

			1	2	3
1	(Spain) (Australia)	Elena Guerra; Anne Minter	4; 6	0; 6
2	(Spain) (Australia)	Ana Almansa; Wendy Turnbull	1; 6	1; 6
3	(Spain) (Australia)	Ana Almansa / Rosa Bielsa; Jenny Byrne / Anne Minter	1; 6	5; 7

=== Quarterfinals ===
==== Czechoslovakia vs. Hungary ====
Czechoslovakia
3
Nagoya Green Tennis Club, Nagoya, Japan
October 1985
Hard (outdoor)

Hungary
0

			1	2	3
1	(Czechoslovakia) (Hungary)	Helena Suková; Csilla Cserépy	6^{5} 7^{7}	6; 2	6; 2
2	(Czechoslovakia) (Hungary)	Hana Mandlíková; Andrea Temesvári	6; 3	6; 4
3	(Czechoslovakia) (Hungary)	Andrea Holíková / Regina Maršíková; Csilla Cserépy / Andrea Temesvári	6; 4	6; 3

==== Great Britain vs. Bulgaria ====
Great Britain
1
Nagoya Green Tennis Club, Nagoya, Japan
October 1985
Hard (outdoor)

Bulgaria
2

			1	2	3
1	(United Kingdom) (Bulgaria)	Jo Durie; Katerina Maleeva	2; 6	6; 4	6; 8
2	(United Kingdom) (Bulgaria)	Annabel Croft; Manuela Maleeva	2; 6	2; 6
3	(United Kingdom) (Bulgaria)	Jo Durie / Anne Hobbs; Katerina Maleeva / Manuela Maleeva	5; 4			retired

==== United States vs. Argentina ====
United States
2
Nagoya Green Tennis Club, Nagoya, Japan
October 1985
Hard (outdoor)

Argentina
1

			1	2	3
1	(United States) (Argentina)	Kathy Jordan; Adriana Villagrán	6; 1	6; 1
2	(United States) (Argentina)	Zina Garrison; Gabriela Sabatini	7; 5	1; 6	1; 6
3	(United States) (Argentina)	Kathy Jordan / Sharon Walsh; Gabriela Sabatini / Adriana Villagrán	5; 7	6; 3	6; 4

==== Italy vs. Australia ====
Italy
0
Nagoya Green Tennis Club, Nagoya, Japan
October 1985
Hard (outdoor)

Australia
3

			1	2	3
1	(Italy) (Australia)	Sandra Cecchini; Anne Minter	3; 6	2; 6
2	(Italy) (Australia)	Raffaella Reggi; Wendy Turnbull	2; 6	1; 6
3	(Italy) (Australia)	Laura Garrone / Raffaella Reggi; Jenny Byrne / Wendy Turnbull	1; 6	3; 6

=== Semifinals ===
==== Czechoslovakia vs. Bulgaria ====
Czechoslovakia
2
Nagoya Green Tennis Club, Nagoya, Japan
October 1985
Hard (outdoor)

Bulgaria
1

			1	2	3
1	(Czechoslovakia) (Bulgaria)	Helena Suková; Katerina Maleeva	3; 6	6^{6} 7^{8}
2	(Czechoslovakia) (Bulgaria)	Hana Mandlíková; Manuela Maleeva	3; 6	6; 2	6; 1
3	(Czechoslovakia) (Bulgaria)	Hana Mandlíková / Helena Suková; Katerina Maleeva / Manuela Maleeva	6; 3	7^{7} 6^{4}

==== United States vs. Australia ====
United States
2
Nagoya Green Tennis Club, Nagoya, Japan
October 1985
Hard (outdoor)

Australia
1

			1	2	3
1	(United States) (Australia)	Elise Burgin; Anne Minter	6; 3	6; 4
2	(United States) (Australia)	Kathy Jordan; Wendy Turnbull	4; 6	7^{9} 6^{7}	5; 7
3	(United States) (Australia)	Elise Burgin / Kathy Jordan; Elizabeth Smylie / Wendy Turnbull	0; 6	6; 1	6; 4

=== Final ===
==== Czechoslovakia vs. United States ====
Czechoslovakia
2
Nagoya Green Tennis Club, Nagoya, Japan
14 October 1985
Hard (outdoor)

United States
1

			1	2	3
1	(Czechoslovakia) (United States)	Helena Suková; Elise Burgin	6; 3	6^{6} 7^{8}	6; 4
2	(Czechoslovakia) (United States)	Hana Mandlíková; Kathy Jordan	7; 5	6; 1
3	(Czechoslovakia) (United States)	Andrea Holíková / Regina Maršíková; Elise Burgin / Sharon Walsh	2; 6	3; 6

1985 Federation Cup Champions
(Czechoslovakia)
Czechoslovakia
Fourth title

== Consolation rounds ==
=== Draw ===
Consolation first round
Soviet Union	2
Austria	1
Chile	1
Greece	2
Norway	1
Hong Kong	2
Netherlands	3
Denmark	0
Indonesia	0
Brazil	3
Belgium	3
Thailand	0

Consolation second round
France	3
Uruguay	0
Chinese Taipei	0
Soviet Union	3
West Germany	3
Greece	0
Finland	1
Hong Kong	2
Netherlands	2
Ireland	1
Brazil	2
Peru	1
Belgium	1
Philippines	2
South Korea	2
Sweden	1

Consolation quarterfinals
France	1
Soviet Union	2
West Germany	2
Hong Kong	1
Netherlands	1
Brazil	2
Philippines	0
South Korea	3

Consolation semifinals
Soviet Union	3
West Germany	0
Brazil	0
South Korea	2

Consolation final
Soviet Union	3
South Korea	0

=== First round ===
==== Soviet Union vs. Austria ====
Soviet Union
2
Nagoya Green Tennis Club, Nagoya, Japan
October 1985
Hard (outdoor)

Austria
1

			1	2	3
1	(Soviet Union) (Austria)	Natalia Egorova; Barbara Pollet	7^{7} 6^{1}	6; 0
2	(Soviet Union) (Austria)	Larisa Savchenko; Petra Huber	2; 6	3; 6
3	(Soviet Union) (Austria)	Svetlana Cherneva / Larisa Savchenko; Petra Huber / Karin Oberleitner	6; 1	6; 2

==== Chile vs. Greece ====
Chile
1
Nagoya Green Tennis Club, Nagoya, Japan
October 1985
Hard (outdoor)

Greece
2

			1	2	3
1	(Chile) (Greece)	Natalie Rodríguez; Olga Tsarbopoulou	2; 6	2; 6
2	(Chile) (Greece)	Paulina Sepúlveda; Angeliki Kanellopoulou	5; 7	2; 6
3	(Chile) (Greece)	Natalie Rodríguez / Paulina Rodríguez; Xenia Anastasiados / Olga Tsarbopoulou	6; 2	6; 3

==== Norway vs. Hong Kong ====
Norway
1
Nagoya Green Tennis Club, Nagoya, Japan
October 1985
Hard (outdoor)

Hong Kong
2

			1	2	3
1	(Norway) (Hong Kong)	Amy Jönsson Raaholt; Lisa Kwok	6; 1	6; 3
2	(Norway) (Hong Kong)	Astrid Sunde; Paulette Moreno	6; 3	1; 6	1; 6
3	(Norway) (Hong Kong)	Amy Jönsson Raaholt / Astrid Sunde; Patricia Hy / Paulette Moreno	6; 2	6^{6} 7^{8}	4; 6

==== Netherlands vs. Denmark ====
Netherlands
3
Nagoya Green Tennis Club, Nagoya, Japan
October 1985
Hard (outdoor)

Denmark
0

			1	2	3
1	(Netherlands) (Denmark)	Nanette Schutte; Anne Møller	6; 4	6; 4
2	(Netherlands) (Denmark)	Marcella Mesker; Tine Scheuer-Larsen	7^{8} 6^{6}	6; 2
3	(Netherlands) (Denmark)	Marcella Mesker / Marianne van der Torre; Therese Arildsen / Anne Møller	6; 4	6; 2

==== Indonesia vs. Brazil ====
Indonesia
0
Nagoya Green Tennis Club, Nagoya, Japan
October 1985
Hard (outdoor)

Brazil
3

			1	2	3
1	(Indonesia) (Brazil)	Yayuk Basuki; Niege Dias	3; 6	1; 6
2	(Indonesia) (Brazil)	Suzanna Anggarkusuma; Patricia Medrado	3; 6	4; 6
3	(Indonesia) (Brazil)	Yayuk Basuki / Lukky Tedjamukti; Cláudia Faillace / Cláudia Monteiro	6^{4} 7^{7}	3; 6

==== Belgium vs. Thailand ====
Belgium
3
Nagoya Green Tennis Club, Nagoya, Japan
October 1985
Hard (outdoor)

Thailand
0

			1	2	3
1	(Belgium) (Thailand)	Ann Devries; Chalada Wattana	6; 4	6; 1
2	(Belgium) (Thailand)	Sandra Wasserman; Voralak Wichienchai	6; 1	6; 2
3	(Belgium) (Thailand)	Ilse de Ruysscher / Kathleen Schuurmans; Ponamporn Samawanthana / Chalada Wattana	2; 6	6; 3	6; 3

=== Second round ===
==== France vs. Uruguay ====
France
3
Nagoya Green Tennis Club, Nagoya, Japan
October 1985
Hard (outdoor)

Uruguay
0

			1	2	3
1	(France) (Uruguay)	Emmanuelle Derly; Claudia van der Weck	6; 2	6; 2
2	(France) (Uruguay)	Isabelle Demongeot; Mariela Clavijo	6; 2	6; 1
3	(France) (Uruguay)	Isabelle Demongeot / Nathalie Tauziat; Mariela Clavijo / Liliana Rodríguez	6; 1	6; 0

==== Chinese Taipei vs. Soviet Union ====
Chinese Taipei
0
Nagoya Green Tennis Club, Nagoya, Japan
October 1985
Hard (outdoor)

Soviet Union
3

			1	2	3
1	(Chinese Taipei) (Soviet Union)	Wen Hsiu-tsuan; Natalia Egorova	1; 6	1; 6
2	(Chinese Taipei) (Soviet Union)	Lin Fang-ling; Larisa Savchenko	2; 6	3; 6
3	(Chinese Taipei) (Soviet Union)	Ho Chiu-mei / Wen Hsiu-tsuan; Elena Eliseenko / Larisa Savchenko	2; 6	1; 6

==== West Germany vs. Greece ====
West Germany
3
Nagoya Green Tennis Club, Nagoya, Japan
October 1985
Hard (outdoor)

Greece
0

			1	2	3
1	(West Germany) (Greece)	Petra Keppeler; Olga Tsarbopoulou	7; 5	6; 1
2	(West Germany) (Greece)	Myriam Schropp; Angeliki Kanellopoulou	6; 1			retired
3	(West Germany) (Greece)	Andrea Betzner / Myriam Schropp; Xenia Anastasiados / Olga Tsarbopoulou	6; 1	6; 3

==== Finland vs. Hong Kong ====
Finland
1
Nagoya Green Tennis Club, Nagoya, Japan
October 1985
Hard (outdoor)

Hong Kong
2

			1	2	3
1	(Finland) (Hong Kong)	Anne Happonen; Paulette Moreno	3; 6	4; 6
2	(Finland) (Hong Kong)	Anne Aallonen; Patricia Hy	1; 6	6; 4	2; 1	retired
3	(Finland) (Hong Kong)	Anne Aallonen / Anne Happonen; Patricia Hy / Paulette Moreno	6^{2} 7^{7}	3; 6

==== Netherlands vs. Ireland ====
Netherlands
2
Nagoya Green Tennis Club, Nagoya, Japan
October 1985
Hard (outdoor)

Ireland
1

			1	2	3
1	(Netherlands) (Republic of Ireland)	Marianne van der Torre; Jennifer Thornton	6; 1	6; 0
2	(Netherlands) (Republic of Ireland)	Marcella Mesker; Siobhán Nicholson	6; 0	6; 0
3	(Netherlands) (Republic of Ireland)	Marielle Rooimans / Nanette Schutte; Siobhán Nicholson / Jennifer Thornton	2; 6	6; 0	5; 7

==== Brazil vs. Peru ====
Brazil
2
Nagoya Green Tennis Club, Nagoya, Japan
October 1985
Hard (outdoor)

Peru
1

			1	2	3
1	(Brazil) (Peru)	Niege Dias; Pilar Vásquez	2; 6	6^{6} 7^{8}
2	(Brazil) (Peru)	Patricia Medrado; Laura Gildemeister	6; 2	7; 5
3	(Brazil) (Peru)	Niege Dias / Patricia Medrado; Laura Gildemeister / Pilar Vásquez	6; 3	6; 4

==== Belgium vs. Philippines ====
Belgium
1
Nagoya Green Tennis Club, Nagoya, Japan
October 1985
Hard (outdoor)

Philippines
2

			1	2	3
1	(Belgium) (Philippines)	Kathleen Schuurmans; Jennifer Saberon	3; 6	3; 6
2	(Belgium) (Philippines)	Ilse de Ruysscher; Dyan Castillejo	6; 4	3; 6	9; 7
3	(Belgium) (Philippines)	Ilse de Ruysscher / Ann Devries; Dyan Castillejo / Jennifer Saberon	2; 6	4; 6

==== South Korea vs. Sweden ====
South Korea
2
Nagoya Green Tennis Club, Nagoya, Japan
October 1985
Hard (outdoor)

Sweden
1

			1	2	3
1	(South Korea) (Sweden)	Kim Soo-ok; Maria Lindström	6; 2	7^{7} 6^{2}
2	(South Korea) (Sweden)	Lee Jeong-soon; Catarina Lindqvist	3; 6	2; 6
3	(South Korea) (Sweden)	Choi Jeong-ok / Kim Soo-ok; Carina Karlsson / Karolina Karlsson	7^{9} 6^{7}	6; 1

=== Quarterfinals ===
==== France vs. Soviet Union ====
France
1
Nagoya Green Tennis Club, Nagoya, Japan
October 1985
Hard (outdoor)

Soviet Union
2

			1	2	3
1	(France) (Soviet Union)	Nathalie Tauziat; Natalia Egorova	5; 7	6; 4	6; 4
2	(France) (Soviet Union)	Isabelle Demongeot; Larisa Savchenko	5; 7	2; 6
3	(France) (Soviet Union)	Isabelle Demongeot / Nathalie Tauziat; Svetlana Cherneva / Larisa Savchenko	3; 6	1; 6

==== West Germany vs. Hong Kong ====
West Germany
2
Nagoya Green Tennis Club, Nagoya, Japan
October 1985
Hard (outdoor)

Hong Kong
1

			1	2	3
1	(West Germany) (Hong Kong)	Petra Keppeler; Paulette Moreno	7^{7} 6^{5}	6; 1
2	(West Germany) (Hong Kong)	Myriam Schropp; Patricia Hy	6; 2	6; 3
3	(West Germany) (Hong Kong)	Andrea Betzner / Myriam Schropp; Patricia Hy / Paulette Moreno	6; 1	2; 6	3; 6

==== Netherlands vs. Brazil ====
Netherlands
1
Nagoya Green Tennis Club, Nagoya, Japan
October 1985
Hard (outdoor)

Brazil
2

			1	2	3
1	(Netherlands) (Brazil)	Marianne van der Torre; Niege Dias	6; 2	2; 6	3; 6
2	(Netherlands) (Brazil)	Marcella Mesker; Patricia Medrado	2; 6	3; 6
3	(Netherlands) (Brazil)	Marielle Rooimans / Marianne van der Torre; Niege Dias / Cláudia Faillace	6; 2	6; 3

==== Philippines vs. South Korea ====
Philippines
0
Nagoya Green Tennis Club, Nagoya, Japan
October 1985
Hard (outdoor)

South Korea
3

			1	2	3
1	(Philippines) (South Korea)	Jennifer Saberon; Kim Soo-ok	0; 6	2; 6
2	(Philippines) (South Korea)	Dyan Castillejo; Lee Jeong-soon	3; 6	3; 6
3	(Philippines) (South Korea)	Dyan Castillejo / Jennifer Saberon; Choi Jeong-ok / Lee Jeong-soon	4; 6	3; 6

=== Semifinals ===
==== Soviet Union vs. West Germany ====
Soviet Union
3
Nagoya Green Tennis Club, Nagoya, Japan
October 1985
Hard (outdoor)

West Germany
0

			1	2	3
1	(Soviet Union) (West Germany)	Natalia Egorova; Petra Keppeler	6; 4	6; 0
2	(Soviet Union) (West Germany)	Larisa Savchenko; Myriam Schropp	6; 4	6; 4
3	(Soviet Union) (West Germany)	Svetlana Cherneva / Elena Eliseenko; Andrea Betzner / Myriam Schropp	7^{7} 6^{4}	6; 3

==== Brazil vs. South Korea ====
Brazil
0
Nagoya Green Tennis Club, Nagoya, Japan
October 1985
Hard (outdoor)

South Korea
2

			1	2	3
1	(Brazil) (South Korea)	Niege Dias; Kim Soo-ok	3; 6	3; 6
2	(Brazil) (South Korea)	Patricia Medrado; Lee Jeong-soon	4; 6	1; 6
3	(Brazil) (South Korea)					not played

=== Final ===
==== Soviet Union vs. South Korea ====
Soviet Union
3
Nagoya Green Tennis Club, Nagoya, Japan
October 1985
Hard (outdoor)

South Korea
0

			1	2	3
1	(Soviet Union) (South Korea)	Natalia Egorova; Kim Soo-ok	6; 0	7; 5
2	(Soviet Union) (South Korea)	Larisa Savchenko; Lee Jeong-soon	7; 5	6; 2
3	(Soviet Union) (South Korea)	Svetlana Cherneva / Elena Eliseenko; Choi Jeong-ok / Lee Jeong-soon	6; 2	6; 2
