= 1988 Vitosha New Otani Open – Doubles =

Doubles
- 1988 Vitosha New Otani Open

Final
- Champions: (Spain) Conchita Martínez (Austria) Barbara Paulus
- Runners-up: (Socialist Federal Republic of Yugoslavia) Sabrina Goleš (Bulgaria) Katerina Maleeva
- Score: 1–6, 6–1, 6–4

Events
Singles	Doubles
← 1987 ·	Vitosha New Otani Open	· 1989 →

Conchita Martínez and Barbara Paulus won in the final 1–6, 6–1, 6–4 against Sabrina Goleš and Katerina Maleeva.

== Seeds ==
Champion seeds are indicated in bold text while text in italics indicates the round in which those seeds were eliminated.

1. (Socialist Federal Republic of Yugoslavia) Sabrina Goleš / (Bulgaria) Katerina Maleeva (final)
2. (West Germany) Andrea Betzner / (United States) Emilse Raponi-Longo (semifinals)
3. (Czechoslovakia) Iva Budařová / (Belgium) Sandra Wasserman (semifinals)
4. (Belgium) Ann Devries / (United Kingdom) Julie Salmon (first round)

== Draw ==
=== Key ===
- Q = Qualifier
- WC = Wild card
- LL = Lucky loser
- Alt = Alternate
- SE = Special exempt
- PR = Protected ranking
- ITF = ITF entry
- JE = Junior exempt
- w/o = Walkover
- r = Retired
- d = Defaulted
- SR = Special ranking

First round
1	(Socialist Federal Republic of Yugoslavia) **S Goleš** (Bulgaria) **K Maleeva**	**6**	**6**
(Greece) A Kanellopoulou (Greece) O Tsarbopoulou	1	1
(Sweden) A-K Olsson (Sweden) M Strandlund	**6**	6	4
(Czechoslovakia) **D Krajčovičová** (Czechoslovakia) **O Votavová**	2	**7**	**6**
3	(Czechoslovakia) **I Budařová** (Belgium) **S Wasserman**	**6**	**6**
(United Kingdom) L Gould (United Kingdom) A Simpkin	3	1
(United States) J Joseph (West Germany) C Schneider	4	3
(Bulgaria) **R Milorieva** (Bulgaria) **D Rangelova**	**6**	**6**
(Spain) **C Martínez** (Austria) **B Paulus**	**6**	4	**6**
(Switzerland) M Strebel (Argentina) A Tiezzi	0	**6**	3
(West Germany) **M Pawlik** (Austria) **H Sprung**	**6**	**6**
4	(Belgium) A Devries (United Kingdom) J Salmon	4	3
(France) **F Martin** (France) **V Paquet**	**7**	2	**6**
(Sweden) H Dahlström (Sweden) J Jonerup	5	**6**	3
(Austria) B Diesner (Czechoslovakia) H Fukárková	2	2
2	(West Germany) **A Betzner** (United States) **E Raponi-Longo**	**6**	**6**

Quarterfinals
1	(Socialist Federal Republic of Yugoslavia) **S Goleš** (Bulgaria) **K Maleeva**	**6**	**6**
(Czechoslovakia) D Krajčovičová (Czechoslovakia) O Votavová	1	1
3	(Czechoslovakia) **I Budařová** (Belgium) **S Wasserman**	3	**6**	**6**
(Bulgaria) R Milorieva (Bulgaria) D Rangelova	**6**	4	2
(Spain) **C Martínez** (Austria) **B Paulus**	**6**	**6**
(West Germany) M Pawlik (Austria) H Sprung	0	4
(France) F Martin (France) V Paquet	3	3
2	(West Germany) **A Betzner** (United States) **E Raponi-Longo**	**6**	**6**

Semifinals
1	(Socialist Federal Republic of Yugoslavia) **S Goleš** (Bulgaria) **K Maleeva**	4	**7**	**7**
3	(Czechoslovakia) I Budařová (Belgium) S Wasserman	**6**	6	6
(Spain) **C Martínez** (Austria) **B Paulus**	0	**6**	**6**
2	(West Germany) A Betzner (United States) E Raponi-Longo	**6**	2	2

Final
1	(Socialist Federal Republic of Yugoslavia) Sabrina Goleš (Bulgaria) Katerina Maleeva	**6**	1	4
(Spain) **Conchita Martínez** (Austria) **Barbara Paulus**	1	**6**	**6**
