= 1989 Arcachon Cup =

- Date: 10–16 July
- Edition: 1st
- Category: Category 2
- Draw: 32S / 14D
- Prize money: $100,000
- Surface: Clay / outdoor
- Location: Arcachon, France

Champions

Singles
- (Austria) Judith Wiesner

Doubles
- (Italy) Sandra Cecchini / (Argentina) Patricia Tarabini
Arcachon Cup

The 1989 Arcachon Cup was a women's tennis tournament played on outdoor clay courts in Arcachon, France that was part of the Category 2 tier of the 1989 WTA Tour. The tournament was held from 10 July until 16 July 1989. Sixth-seeded Judith Wiesner won the singles title.

== Finals ==
=== Singles ===
(Austria) Judith Wiesner defeated (Austria) Barbara Paulus 6–3, 6–7^{(3–7)}, 6–1

- It was Wiesner's only singles title of the year and the 2nd of her career.

=== Doubles ===
(Italy) Sandra Cecchini / (Argentina) Patricia Tarabini defeated (Argentina) Mercedes Paz / (Netherlands) Brenda Schultz 6–3, 7–6^{(7–5)}

- It was Cecchini's 1st title of the year and the 11th of her career. It was Tarabini's 1st title of the year and the 1st of her career.
