= 1989 Arcachon Cup – Singles =

Singles
- 1989 Arcachon Cup

Final
- Champion: (Austria) Judith Wiesner
- Runner-up: (Austria) Barbara Paulus
- Score: 6–3, 6–7, 6–1

Details
- Draw: 32
- Seeds: 8

Events
Singles	Doubles
Arcachon Cup

Judith Wiesner won in the final 6–3, 6–7, 6–1 against Barbara Paulus.

== Seeds ==
A champion seed is indicated in bold text while text in italics indicates the round in which that seed was eliminated.

1. (Spain) Conchita Martínez (first round)
2. (Austria) Barbara Paulus (final)
3. (West Germany) Isabel Cueto (quarterfinals)
4. (Italy) Sandra Cecchini (second round)
5. (Argentina) Bettina Fulco (first round)
6. (Austria) **Judith Wiesner (champion)**
7. (Belgium) Sandra Wasserman (first round)
8. (Brazil) Niege Dias (first round)

== Draw ==
=== Key ===
- Q = Qualifier
- WC = Wild card
- LL = Lucky loser
- Alt = Alternate
- SE = Special exempt
- PR = Protected ranking
- ITF = ITF entry
- JE = Junior exempt
- w/o = Walkover
- r = Retired
- d = Defaulted
- SR = Special ranking

First round
1	(Spain) C Martínez	**6**	2	4
(Brazil) **A Vieira**	3	**6**	**6**
(Netherlands) **N Jagerman**	3	**6**	**6**
(Greece) A Kanellopoulou	**6**	1	2
(Italy) **L Garrone**	**7**	**6**
(France) P Etchemendy	5	2
(Italy) **C Caverzasio**	**6**	**6**
8	(Brazil) N Dias	0	2
4	(Italy) **S Cecchini**	**6**	**6**
(France) N Guerrée	1	3
(France) N Herreman	6	4
(West Germany) **S Hack**	**7**	**6**
(France) **M Laval**	**6**	**6**
(Italy) S La Fratta	3	4
(United States) A Farley	0	2
6	(Austria) **J Wiesner**	**6**	**6**
5	(Argentina) B Fulco	2	4
(France) **K Quentrec**	**6**	**6**
(France) M-C Damas	3	2
(Argentina) **M Paz**	**6**	**6**
(Netherlands) B Schultz	2	6
(Italy) **L Lapi**	**6**	**7**
(Argentina) P Tarabini	3	**6**	2
3	(West Germany) **I Cueto**	**6**	1	**6**
7	(Belgium) S Wasserman	1	5
Q	(Italy) **B Romanò**	**6**	**7**
Q	(Argentina) **F Labat**	**6**	**7**
Q	(Belgium) S Appelmans	4	6
(France) **J Halard**	**6**	2	**6**
Q	(France) C Bonnet	1	**6**	2
(Austria) P Ritter	4	**6**	2
2	(Austria) **B Paulus**	**6**	0	**6**

Second round
(Brazil) A Vieira	3	0	r
(Netherlands) **N Jagerman**	**6**	**4**
(Italy) L Garrone	**6**	3	2
(Italy) **C Caverzasio**	3	**6**	**6**
4	(Italy) S Cecchini	**7**	2	1
(West Germany) **S Hack**	6	**6**	**6**
(France) M Laval	4	1
6	(Austria) **J Wiesner**	**6**	**6**
(France) K Quentrec	2	4
(Argentina) **M Paz**	**6**	**6**
(Italy) L Lapi	3	1
3	(West Germany) **I Cueto**	**6**	**6**
Q	(Italy) B Romanò	6	**6**	2
Q	(Argentina) **F Labat**	**7**	4	**6**
(France) J Halard	3	**6**	2
2	(Austria) **B Paulus**	**6**	4	**6**

Quarterfinals
(Netherlands) **N Jagerman**	4	**6**	**6**
(Italy) C Caverzasio	**6**	1	4
(West Germany) S Hack	6	5
6	(Austria) **J Wiesner**	**7**	**7**
(Argentina) **M Paz**	**7**	**7**
3	(West Germany) I Cueto	6	5
Q	(Argentina) F Labat	2	1
2	(Austria) **B Paulus**	**6**	**6**

Semifinals
(Netherlands) N Jagerman	0	4
6	(Austria) **J Wiesner**	**6**	**6**
(Argentina) M Paz	5	**7**	2
2	(Austria) **B Paulus**	**7**	6	**6**

Final
6	(Austria) **Judith Wiesner**	**6**	6	**6**
2	(Austria) Barbara Paulus	3	**7**	1
