= 1988 Vitosha New Otani Open =

- Date: 8–14 August
- Edition: 1st
- Category: Category 2
- Draw: 32S /16D
- Prize money: $100,000
- Surface: Hard / outdoor
- Location: Sofia, Bulgaria

Champions

Singles
- (Spain) Conchita Martínez

Doubles
- (Spain) Conchita Martínez / (Austria) Barbara Paulus
Vitosha New Otani Open	· 1989 →

The 1988 Vitosha New Otani Open was a women's tennis tournament played on outdoor hard courts in Sofia, Bulgaria and was part of the Category 2 tier of the 1988 WTA Tour. The tournament ran from 8 August until 14 August 1988. Sixth-seeded Conchita Martínez won the singles title and earned $17,000 first-prize money.

== Finals ==
=== Singles ===
(Spain) Conchita Martínez defeated (Austria) Barbara Paulus 6–1, 6–2

- It was Martínez's 1st title of the year and the 1st of her career.

=== Doubles ===
(Spain) Conchita Martínez / (Austria) Barbara Paulus defeated (Socialist Federal Republic of Yugoslavia) Sabrina Goleš / (Bulgaria) Katerina Maleeva 1–6, 6–1, 6–4

- It was Martínez's 2nd title of the year and the 2nd of her career. It was Paulus' 2nd title of the year and the 2nd of her career.
