= List of Austria Fed Cup team representatives =

This is a list of tennis players who have represented the Austria Fed Cup team in an official Fed Cup match. Austria have taken part in the competition since 1963.

== Players ==
| Player | W-L (Total) | W-L (Singles) | W-L (Doubles) | Ties | Debut |
|---|---|---|---|---|---|
| Sybille Bammer | 9 – 9 | 9 – 6 | 0 – 3 | 14 | 2003 |
| Sabine Bernegger | 1 – 6 | 1 – 3 | 0 – 3 | 5 | 1972 |
| Veronika Buche | 5 – 12 | 3 – 6 | 2 – 6 | 11 | 1972 |
| Sandra Dopfer | 0 – 1 | 0 – 1 | - | 2 | 1993 |
| Evelyn Fauth | 0 – 5 | 0 – 3 | 0 – 2 | 3 | 2002 |
| Maria Geyer | 1 – 5 | 1 – 3 | 0 – 2 | 4 | 1980 |
| Julia Grabher | 3 – 14 | 1 – 5 | 2 – 9 | 13 | 2015 |
| Barbara Haas | 10 – 6 | 8 – 4 | 2 – 2 | 12 | 2015 |
| Monika Hassmann | 1 – 3 | 1 – 1 | 0 – 2 | 2 | 1964 |
| Edda Herdy | 1 – 1 | - | 1 – 1 | 2 | 1963 |
| Nikola Hofmanova | 1 – 3 | 0 – 3 | 1 – 0 | 4 | 2006 |
| Maria Hollingsworth | 3 – 3 | 2 – 2 | 1 – 1 | 4 | 1974 |
| Petra Huber | 10 – 11 | 7 – 5 | 3 – 6 | 12 | 1983 |
| Margarethe Kerschbaum | 0 – 1 | - | 0 – 1 | 1 | 1978 |
| Daniela Kix | 0 – 1 | 0 – 1 | - | 1 | 2004 |
| Melanie Klaffner | 10 – 14 | 4 – 7 | 6 – 7 | 17 | 2006 |
| Daniela Klemenschits | 1 – 1 | - | 1 – 1 | 2 | 2005 |
| Sandra Klemenschits | 11 – 10 | - | 11 – 10 | 24 | 2005 |
| Pia König | 0 – 3 | 0 – 1 | 0 – 2 | 2 | 2017 |
| Karin Kschwendt | 0 – 1 | - | 0 – 1 | 1 | 1997 |
| Marion Maruska | 2 – 6 | 1 – 2 | 1 – 4 | 6 | 1991 |
| Patricia Mayr-Achleitner | 14 – 15 | 11 – 10 | 3 – 5 | 22 | 2008 |
| Yvonne Meusburger | 8 – 21 | 5 – 13 | 3 – 8 | 21 | 2003 |
| Karin Oberleitner | 0 – 1 | - | 0 – 1 | 1 | 1985 |
| Sonja Pachta | 3 – 13 | 1 – 8 | 2 – 5 | 9 | 1963 |
| Tamira Paszek | 9 – 15 | 7 – 12 | 2 – 3 | 17 | 2005 |
| Barbara Paulus | 9 – 13 | 7 – 8 | 2 – 5 | 13 | 1989 |
| Andrea Pesak | 2 – 11 | 0 – 7 | 2 – 4 | 7 | 1980 |
| Sylvia Plischke | 5 – 6 | 2 – 4 | 3 – 2 | 7 | 1994 |
| Barbara Pollet | 0 – 3 | 0 – 2 | 0 – 1 | 2 | 1985 |
| Beate Reinstadler | 1 – 3 | 1 – 1 | 0 – 2 | 3 | 1990 |
| Nicole Rottmann | 3 – 1 | 0 – 1 | 3 – 0 | 3 | 2013 |
| Barbara Schett | 30 – 18 | 19 – 13 | 11 – 5 | 24 | 1993 |
| Melanie Schnell | 1 – 0 | - | 1 – 0 | 1 | 1996 |
| Barbara Schwartz | 9 – 8 | 8 – 5 | 1 – 3 | 9 | 1998 |
| Petra Schwarz | 11 – 11 | 3 – 4 | 8 – 7 | 19 | 1995 |
| Ingrid Sommerauer | 1 – 1 | - | 1 – 1 | 2 | 1982 |
| Heidi Sprung | 2 – 1 | 1 – 0 | 1 – 1 | 2 | 1988 |
| Uschi Ulrich | 0 – 2 | 0 – 1 | 0 – 1 | 1 | 1978 |
| Patricia Wartusch | 6 – 12 | 3 – 6 | 3 – 6 | 11 | 2000 |
| Judith Wiesner | 39 – 27 | 28 – 16 | 11 – 11 | 40 | 1983 |
| Helena Wimmer | 0 – 3 | 0 – 2 | 0 – 1 | 2 | 1977 |
| Andrea Winkler | 0 – 4 | 0 – 3 | 0 – 1 | 3 | 1963 |
