= 1989 Arcachon Cup – Doubles =

Doubles
- 1989 Arcachon Cup

Final
- Champions: (Italy) Sandra Cecchini; (Argentina) Patricia Tarabini
- Runners-up: (Argentina) Mercedes Paz; (Netherlands) Brenda Schultz
- Score: 6–3, 7–6

Details
- Draw: 14
- Seeds: 4

Events
Singles	Doubles
Arcachon Cup

Sandra Cecchini and Patricia Tarabini won in the final 6–3, 7–6 against Mercedes Paz and Brenda Schultz.

== Seeds ==
Champion seeds are indicated in bold text while text in italics indicates the round in which those seeds were eliminated. The top two seeded teams received byes into the quarterfinals.

1. (Argentina) Mercedes Paz / (Netherlands) Brenda Schultz (final)
2. (Austria) Barbara Paulus / (Austria) Judith Wiesner (semifinals)
3. (Italy) **Sandra Cecchini** / (Argentina) **Patricia Tarabini (champions)**
4. (Netherlands) Nicole Jagerman / (Belgium) Sandra Wasserman (first round)

== Draw ==
=== Key ===
- Q = Qualifier
- WC = Wild card
- LL = Lucky loser
- Alt = Alternate
- SE = Special exempt
- PR = Protected ranking
- ITF = ITF entry
- JE = Junior exempt
- w/o = Walkover
- r = Retired
- d = Defaulted
- SR = Special ranking

First round

Quarterfinals

Semifinals

Final

1
- (Argentina) **M Paz**
- (Netherlands) **B Schultz**
**6**
**6**

- (Greece) **A Kanellopoulou**
- (United States) **A Leand**
**6**
2
**6**

- (Greece) A Kanellopoulou
- (United States) A Leand
1
4

- (France) J Halard
- (Bulgaria) M Maleeva
0
**6**
4

1
- (Argentina) **M Paz**
- (Netherlands) **B Schultz**
4
**6**
**6**

4
- (Netherlands) N Jagerman
- (Belgium) S Wasserman
1
3

- (Argentina) F Labat
- (Argentina) G Mosca
**6**
3
3

- (West Germany) **I Cueto**
- (West Germany) **S Hack**
**6**
**6**

- (West Germany) I Cueto
- (West Germany) S Hack
1
1

- (Italy) L Garrone
- (Austria) P Ritter
3
1

- (Argentina) **F Labat**
- (Argentina) **G Mosca**
**6**
**6**

- (Argentina) **F Labat**
- (Argentina) **G Mosca**
**6**
**6**

1
- (Argentina) Mercedes Paz
- (Netherlands) Brenda Schultz
3
6

- (Italy) **C Caverzasio**
- (United States) **A Farley**
**6**
**6**

3
- (Italy) **Sandra Cecchini**
- (Argentina) **Patricia Tarabini**
**6**
**7**

- (Brazil) N Dias
- (Argentina) A Villagrán
3
2

- (Italy) C Caverzasio
- (United States) A Farley
**6**
3
2

- (Argentina) G Castro
- (Spain) C Martínez
3
2

3
- (Italy) **S Cecchini**
- (Argentina) **P Tarabini**
2
**6**
**6**

3
- (Italy) **S Cecchini**
- (Argentina) **P Tarabini**
**6**
**6**

3
- (Italy) **S Cecchini**
- (Argentina) **P Tarabini**
2
**7**
**6**

- (Italy) **S La Fratta**
- (Italy) **B Romanò**
**6**
**6**

2
- (Austria) B Paulus
- (Austria) J Wiesner
**6**
6
2

- (France) N Herreman
- (France) K Quentrec
2
4

- (Italy) S La Fratta
- (Italy) B Romanò
2
6

2
- (Austria) **B Paulus**
- (Austria) **J Wiesner**
**6**
**7**
