= Karin Oberleitner =

Austrian tennis player

- Country (sports): Austria
- Born: 14 March 1968 (age 57)

Singles
- Career record: 31–41
- Highest ranking: No. 290 (20 July 1987)

Doubles
- Career record: 11–19
- Highest ranking: No. 282 (17 August 1987)

Karin Oberleitner (born 14 March 1968) is an Austrian former professional tennis player.

Oberleitner represented Austria in a 1985 Federation Cup tie against the USSR in Nagoya, where she featured in a dead rubber doubles match with Barbara Pollet, losing to Svetlana Cherneva and Larisa Savchenko. She competed on the international circuit through the late 1980s and reached a career best singles ranking of 290 in the world.

Her husband is former ATP Tour player Alex Antonitsch and their daughter Mira has played Fed Cup for Austria. The couple also have a son Sam who is a professional ice hockey player.

== ITF finals ==
=== Singles: 2 (0–2) ===
Result	No.	Date	Tournament	Surface	Opponent	Score
Loss	1.	1 September 1986	Wels, Austria	Hard	(Netherlands) Nicolette Rooimans	6–4, 3–6, 1–6
Loss	2.	7 August 1988	Wels, Austria	Hard (i)	(Austria) Petra Schwarz	6–2, 0–6, 2–6

=== Doubles: 2 (1–1) ===
Result	No.	Date	Tournament	Surface	Partner	Opponents	Score
Win	1.	1 September 1986	Wels, Austria	Clay	(Hong Kong) Paulette Moreno	(Austria) Bettina Diesner (Austria) Barbara Paulus	7–5, 7–6^{(7–4)}
Loss	1.	2 August 1987	Kitzbuhel, Austria	Clay	(Austria) Bettina Diesner	(Austria) Judith Wiesner (Austria) Heidi Sprung	3–6, 4–6

== See also ==
- List of Austria Fed Cup team representatives
