= Michaela Frimmelová =

Slovak tennis player

- Country (sports): Czechoslovakia
- Born: 17 September 1970 (age 54)
- Prize money: $28,961

Singles
- Career titles: 0
- Highest ranking: No. 168 (19 December 1988)

Doubles
- Career titles: 3 ITF
- Highest ranking: No. 139 (30 July 1990)

Grand Slam doubles results
- French Open: 1R (1990)

Michaela Frimmelová (born 17 September 1970) is a Slovak former professional tennis player.

Frimmelová competed on the professional tour from 1987 to 1990, reaching a best singles ranking of 168 in the world. Her best performances on the WTA Tour were second-round appearances at Aix-en-Provence in 1988 and Sofia in 1989. She featured in the women's doubles main draw at the 1990 French Open.

== ITF finals ==
$25,000 tournaments
$10,000 tournaments

=== Singles: 1 (0–1) ===
Outcome	No.	Date	Tournament	Surface	Opponent	Score
Runner-up	1.	6 June 1988	ITF Modena, Italy	Clay	(South Africa) Amanda Coetzer	5–7, 6–7

=== Doubles: 5 (3–2) ===
Outcome	No.	Date	Tournament	Surface	Partner	Opponents	Score
Winner	1.	14 September 1987	ITF Sofia, Bulgaria	Clay	(Czechoslovakia) Petra Langrová	(Finland) Anne Aallonen (West Germany) Evelyn Larwig	6–2, 6–2
Winner	2.	12 October 1987	ITF Mali Lošinj, Yugoslavia	Clay	(Czechoslovakia) Petra Holubová	(Czechoslovakia) Denisa Krajčovičová (Czechoslovakia) Jana Pospíšilová	7–5, 4–6, 7–5
Winner	3.	4 April 1988	ITF Bari, Italy	Clay	(Czechoslovakia) Petra Langrová	(Argentina) Gaby Castro (Spain) Ana Segura	6–4, 7–5
Runner-up	1.	16 April 1990	ITF Naples, Italy	Hard	(Hungary) Réka Szikszay	(Czechoslovakia) Ivana Jankovská (Czechoslovakia) Eva Melicharová	3–6, 4–6
Runner-up	2.	23 April 1990	ITF Caserta, Italy	Hard	(Hungary) Réka Szikszay	(Soviet Union) Elena Brioukhovets (Soviet Union) Eugenia Maniokova	6–4, 3–6, 1–6
