= Paulette Moreno =

Hong Kong tennis player

- Full name: Paulette Moreno Hjorth
- Country (sports): Hong Kong
- Born: 12 March 1969 (age 56)
- Prize money: $30,719

Singles
- Highest ranking: No. 231 (15 February 1988)

Grand Slam singles results
- Australian Open: 2R (1988)
- Wimbledon: Q1 (1989)

Doubles
- Highest ranking: No. 178 (15 February 1988)

Grand Slam doubles results
- Australian Open: 2R (1988)
- Wimbledon: Q2 (1990)

Grand Slam mixed doubles results
- Wimbledon: 2R (1989)

Paulette Moreno Hjorth (born 12 March 1969) is a former professional tennis player from Hong Kong.

== Biography ==
Moreno was a national champion in Hong Kong at the age of 13 in 1982.

She made her debut for the Hong Kong Fed Cup team in 1985 and won a doubles match against West Germany that year. Another of her doubles wins came against Sweden in 1987, when she and Patricia Hy teamed up to claim the deciding rubber 9–7 in the third set. As a junior she was a finalist in the girls' doubles at the 1987 Wimbledon Championships, where she and Korean Kim Il-Soon lost to Natalia Medvedeva and Natasha Zvereva.

From 1987 to 1991 she competed on the WTA Tour. She appeared twice in the main draw at Wimbledon, both times in mixed doubles, partnering Todd Woodbridge in 1987 and Neil Borwick in 1989. In between she also featured at the 1988 Australian Open and made the second round of the singles, with a win over Marianne van der Torre.

She made her final Fed Cup appearance in 1995 and finished with an 18/17 overall record.

Moreno lived for a while in Melbourne after her tennis career but has since moved to Denmark, where her husband is from. In 2017 she began working as a coach at the Lyngby Tennis Club in Copenhagen.

== ITF finals ==
=== Doubles: 11 (6–5) ===
Result	No.	Date	Tournament	Surface	Partner	Opponents	Score
Win	1.	25 August 1986	Wels, Austria	Clay	(Austria) Karin Oberleitner	(Austria) Bettina Diesner (Austria) Barbara Paulus	7–5, 7–6^{(7–4)}
Win	2.	21 September 1987	Llorca, Spain	Clay	(Norway) Amy Jönsson Raaholt	(Sweden) Maria Ekstrand (Sweden) Monica Lundqvist	7–6, 6–7, 7–5
Loss	3.	26 October 1987	Cheshire, United Kingdom	Carpet	(Sweden) Maria Strandlund	(Soviet Union) Eugenia Maniokova (Soviet Union) Natalia Medvedeva	2–6, 6–7
Win	4.	16 November 1987	Croydon, United Kingdom	Carpet	(Soviet Union) Viktoria Milvidskaia	(Soviet Union) Eugenia Maniokova (Soviet Union) Natalia Medvedeva	6–4, 6–1
Loss	5.	24 October 1988	Ibaraki, Japan	Hard	(Japan) Maya Kidowaki	(Japan) Kimiko Date (Japan) Yuko Hosoki	4–6, 6–4, 7–9
Win	6.	5 March 1989	Canberra, Australia	Hard	(Japan) Shiho Okada	(Australia) Kate McDonald (Australia) Rennae Stubbs	6–4, 6–2
Loss	7.	18 September 1989	Bangkok, Thailand	Hard	(Denmark) Karin Ptaszek	(United Kingdom) Valda Lake (New Zealand) Claudine Toleafoa	6–7, 6–1, 5–7
Win	8.	27 November 1989	Melbourne, Australia	Hard	(Australia) Danielle Jones	(United States) Allison Cooper (Australia) Justine Hodder	6–2, 6–2
Loss	9.	20 August 1990	Chiang Mai, Thailand	Hard	(Thailand) Orawan Thampensri	(Netherlands) Esmir Hoogendoorn (Netherlands) Claire Wegink	3–6, 6–1, 1–6
Win	10.	7 October 1991	Matsuyama, Japan	Hard	(Australia) Jenny Byrne	(Philippines) Jennifer Saret (China) Yi Jing-Qian	1–6, 6–4, 6–4
Loss	11.	14 October 1991	Kyoto, Japan	Hard	(United States) Diana Gardner	(China) Li Fang (China) Tang Min	4–6, 5–7
