= Arcachon Cup =

Defunct tennis tournament
- Event name: Arcachon Cup (1989)
- Tour: WTA Tour (1989)
- Founded: 1989
- Abolished: 1989
- Surface: Clay (1989)

The Arcachon Cup is a defunct WTA Tour affiliated tennis tournament played in 1989. It was held in Arcachon in France and played on outdoor clay courts.

== Finals ==
=== Singles ===
| Year | Champion | Runner-up | Score |
|---|---|---|---|
| 1989 | (Austria) Judith Wiesner | (Austria) Barbara Paulus | 6–3, 6–7^{(3–7)}, 6–1 |

=== Doubles ===
| Year | Champions | Runners-up | Score |
|---|---|---|---|
| 1989 | (Italy) Sandra Cecchini (Argentina) Patricia Tarabini | (Argentina) Mercedes Paz (Netherlands) Brenda Schultz | 6–3, 7–6^{(7–5)} |
