= Florentina Curpene =

Romanian-born German tennis player

- Country (sports): Romania; Germany
- Born: 26 August 1967 (age 58)
- Prize money: $11,889

Singles
- Career record: 1–1 (Federation Cup)
- Career titles: 1 ITF
- Highest ranking: No. 209 (6 Jul 1992)

Doubles
- Highest ranking: No. 406 (27 Mar 1989)

Florentina Curpene (born 26 August 1967) is a Romanian-born German former professional tennis player.

Curpene is originally from the Romanian city of Pitești but has lived in Germany since 1989. Before relocating she played Federation Cup tennis, featuring in two ties for Romania in 1986. She reached a best singles ranking on the professional tour of 209 in the world. In 2022 she won a senior world team championship for Germany in the 50s age group.

== ITF finals ==
$25,000 tournaments
$5,000 tournaments

=== Singles: 2 (1–1) ===
Result	No.	Date	Tournament	Surface	Opponent	Score
Loss	1.	Jun 1988	ITF Velden, Austria	Clay	(Austria) Sandra Dopfer	1–6, 6–7
Win	2.	Aug 1991	ITF Rheda-Wiedenbrück, Germany	Clay	(Austria) Heidi Sprung	6–3, 6–2

=== Doubles: 1 (0–1) ===
Result	No.	Date	Tournament	Surface	Partner	Opponents	Score
Loss	1.	Jun 1988	ITF Velden, Austria	Clay	(Hungary) Nóra Köves	(Germany) Aurelia Gheorghe (South Africa) Nelia Kruger	4–6, 6–7
