= 1989 Vitosha New Otani Open =

- Date: 31 July – 6 August
- Edition: 2nd
- Category: Category 1
- Draw: 32S / 16D
- Prize money: $50,000
- Surface: Clay / outdoor
- Location: Sofia, Bulgaria

Champions

Singles
- (West Germany) Isabel Cueto

Doubles
- (Italy) Laura Garrone / (Italy) Laura Golarsa
← 1988 ·	Vitosha New Otani Open

The 1989 Vitosha New Otani Open was a women's tennis tournament played on outdoor clay courts in Sofia, Bulgaria that was part of the Category 1 tier of the 1989 WTA Tour. The tournament was held from 31 July until 6 August 1989. Second-seeded Isabel Cueto won the singles title.

== Finals ==
=== Singles ===
(West Germany) Isabel Cueto defeated (Bulgaria) Katerina Maleeva 6–2, 7–6^{(7–3)}

- It was Cueto's 2nd title of the year and the 5th of her career.

=== Doubles ===
(Italy) Laura Garrone / (Italy) Laura Golarsa defeated (West Germany) Silke Meier / (Bulgaria) Elena Pampoulova 6–4, 7–5

- It was Garrone's only title of the year and the 1st of her career. It was Golarsa's only title of the year and the 1st of her career.
