= Réka Szikszay =

Hungarian tennis player

- Country (sports): Hungary
- Born: 3 August 1965 (age 59)
- Prize money: $26,670

Singles
- Career titles: 1 ITF
- Highest ranking: No. 196 (11 June 1990)

Doubles
- Career titles: 7 ITF
- Highest ranking: No. 125 (25 June 1990)

Grand Slam doubles results
- French Open: 2R (1990)

Réka Szikszay (born 3 August 1965) is a former professional tennis player from Hungary.

== Biography ==
Szikszay represented Hungary at the 1986 Goodwill Games and played Fed Cup tennis for her country from 1986 to 1990. She appeared in a total of 13 ties and finished with a 14-9 overall win–loss record. Most effective in doubles, she was unbeaten in the five matches she partnered Andrea Temesvári in and lost only two of her 13 doubles fixtures.

She competed for a year on the WTA Tour, with her best performance coming at the 1989 Vitosha New Otani Open in Sofia, where she made the second round of the singles and was a doubles semifinalist, partnering Michaela Frimmelová.

Her only Grand Slam main-draw appearance came at the 1990 French Open, in the women's doubles competition with Caroline Vis. The pair were beaten in the second round by Betsy Nagelsen and Monica Seles.

== ITF finals ==
=== Singles: 4 (1-3) ===
$25,000 tournaments
$10,000 tournaments

| Result | No. | Date | Tournament | Surface | Opponent | Score |
|---|---|---|---|---|---|---|
| Loss | 1. | 29 August 1988 | ITF Nivelles, Belgium | Clay | (France) Catherine Mothes-Jobkel | 3–6, 1–6 |
| Win | 2. | 19 September 1988 | ITF Marsa, Malta | Hard | (Netherlands) Titia Wilmink | 6–2, 2–6, 6–1 |
| Loss | 3. | 17 April 1989 | ITF Dubrovnik, Yugoslavia | Clay | (West Germany) Eva-Maria Schürhoff | 6–7, 4–6 |
| Loss | 4. | 24 April 1989 | ITF Dubrovnik, Yugoslavia | Clay | (Hungary) Anna Földényi | 2–6, 7–6^{(8)}, 6–7^{(6)} |

=== Doubles: 13 (7–6) ===
| Result | No. | Date | Tournament | Surface | Partner | Opponents | Score |
|---|---|---|---|---|---|---|---|
| Loss | 1. | 9 June 1986 | ITF Lyon, France | Clay | (Czechoslovakia) Denisa Krajčovičová | (Netherlands) Nicole Muns-Jagerman (Netherlands) Simone Schilder | 5–7, 4–6 |
| Win | 2. | 9 February 1987 | ITF Reims, France | Clay (i) | (United States) Erika Smith | (Czechoslovakia) Regina Rajchrtová (West Germany) Andrea Vopat | 6–4, 6–3 |
| Loss | 3. | 1 June 1987 | ITF Adria, Italy | Clay | (United States) Erika Smith | (Czechoslovakia) Nora Bajčíková (Czechoslovakia) Petra Langrová | 7–6, 5–7, 2–6 |
| Win | 4. | 17 August 1987 | ITF Lisbon, Portugal | Clay | (West Germany) Veronika Martinek | (Italy) Stefania Dalla Valle (Austria) Bettina Diesner | 7–6^{(4)}, 6–7^{(5)}, 7–6^{(5)} |
| Win | 5. | 4 July 1988 | ITF Cava de' Tirreni, Italy | Clay | (Hungary) Virág Csurgó | (West Germany) Christiane Hofmann (Poland) Katarzyna Nowak | 6–1, 6–1 |
| Loss | 6. | 29 August 1988 | ITF Nivelles, Belgium | Clay | (Netherlands) Amy van Buuren | (Soviet Union) Elena Brioukhovets (Soviet Union) Viktoria Milvidskaia | 6–1, 5–7, 1–6 |
| Loss | 7. | 19 September 1988 | ITF Marsa, Malta | Hard | (Netherlands) Amy van Buuren | (Switzerland) Mareke Plocher (Netherlands) Titia Wilmink | 5–7, 6–7 |
| Win | 8. | 24 April 1989 | ITF Dubrovnik, Yugoslavia | Clay | (Hungary) Virág Csurgó | (Czechoslovakia) Nora Bajčíková (Czechoslovakia) Petra Holubová | 6–0, 1–0 ret. |
| Win | 9. | 3 July 1989 | ITF Stuttgart, West Germany | Clay | (West Germany) Anouschka Popp | (Brazil) Luciana Tella (Argentina) Andrea Tiezzi | 7–5, 6–4 |
| Win | 10. | 24 July 1989 | ITF Kitzbühel, Austria | Clay | (Czechoslovakia) Jitka Dubcová | (West Germany) Henrike Kadzidroga (Netherlands) Nathalie van Dierendonck | 6–2, 6–4 |
| Loss | 11. | 16 April 1990 | ITF Naples, Italy | Hard | (Czechoslovakia) Michaela Frimmelová | (Czechoslovakia) Ivana Jankovská (Czechoslovakia) Eva Melicharová | 3–6, 4–6 |
| Loss | 12. | 23 April 1990 | ITF Caserta, Italy | Hard | (Czechoslovakia) Michaela Frimmelová | (Soviet Union) Elena Brioukhovets (Soviet Union) Eugenia Maniokova | 6–4, 3–6, 1–6 |
| Win | 13. | 9 July 1990 | ITF Erlangen, West Germany | Clay | (West Germany) Eva Pfaff | (Soviet Union) Agnese Blumberga (Soviet Union) Eugenia Maniokova | 6–3, 6–1 |

== National representation ==
=== Fed Cup (14–9) ===
| Group membership World Group (4–1) World Group Consolation Round (10–8) | Matches by surface Hard (9–6) Clay (5–3) Grass (0–0) Carpet (0–0) | Matches by type Singles (3–7) Doubles (11–2) | Matches by setting Indoors (0–0) Outdoors (14–9) |

==== Singles (3–7) ====
| Edition | Stage | Date | Location | Against | Surface | Opponent | W/L | Score |
|---|---|---|---|---|---|---|---|---|
| 1986 Federation Cup; World Group Consolation Round | First round | July 1986 | Prague, Czechoslovakia | Poland | Clay | Renata Wojtkiewicz | W | 6–4, 6–4 |
| 1986 Federation Cup; World Group Consolation Round | Second round | July 1986 | Prague, Czechoslovakia | Uruguay | Clay | Silvana Casaretto | W | 6–2, 6–1 |
| 1986 Federation Cup; World Group Consolation Round | Quarterfinal | July 1986 | Prague, Czechoslovakia | Belgium | Clay | Sandra Wasserman | L | 2–6, 1–6 |
| 1986 Federation Cup; World Group Consolation Round | Semifinal | July 1986 | Prague, Czechoslovakia | (United Kingdom) Great Britain | Clay | Anne Hobbs | L | 3–6, 2–6 |
| 1988 Federation Cup; World Group | First round | 6 December 1988 | Melbourne, Australia | Finland | Hard | Petra Thorén | L | 3–6, 3–6 |
| 1988 Federation Cup; World Group Consolation Round | Second round | December 1988 | Melbourne, Australia | Brazil | Hard | Neige Dias | L | 2–6, 0–6 |
| 1990 Federation Cup; World Group Consolation Round | Second round | 26 July 1990 | Norcross, United States | China | Hard | Li Fang | L | 6–1, 4–6, 2–6 |
| 1990 Federation Cup; World Group Consolation Round | Quarterfinal | 27 July 1990 | Norcross, United States | Luxembourg | Hard | Marie-Christine Goy | W | 6–2, 6–7^{(2–7)}, 6–1 |
| 1990 Federation Cup; World Group Consolation Round | Semifinal | 28 July 1990 | Norcross, United States | Argentina | Hard | Bettina Fulco | L | 4–6, 5–7 |
| 1990 Federation Cup; World Group Consolation Round | Final | 29 July 1990 | Norcross, United States | Indonesia | Hard | Suzanna Anggarkusuma | L | 3–6, 1–6 |

==== Doubles (11–2) ====
| Edition | Stage | Date | Location | Against | Surface | Partner | Opponents | W/L | Score |
|---|---|---|---|---|---|---|---|---|---|
| 1986 Federation Cup; World Group Consolation Round | First round | July 1986 | Prague, Czechoslovakia | Poland | Clay | Csilla Bartos | Monika Waniek; Ewa Żerdecka | W | 6–4, 6–0 |
| 1986 Federation Cup; World Group Consolation Round | Second round | July 1986 | Prague, Czechoslovakia | Uruguay | Clay | Csilla Bartos | Fiorella Bonicelli; Silvana Casaretto | W | 6–1, 6–1 |
| 1986 Federation Cup; World Group Consolation Round | Quarterfinal | July 1986 | Prague, Czechoslovakia | Belgium | Clay | Csilla Bartos | Ann Devries; Sandra Wasserman | W | 4–6, 6–1, 6–0 |
| 1986 Federation Cup; World Group Consolation Round | Semifinal | July 1986 | Prague, Czechoslovakia | (United Kingdom) Great Britain | Clay | Csilla Bartos | Annabel Croft; Anne Hobbs | L | 1–2 ret. |
| 1988 Federation Cup; World Group | First round | 6 December 1988 | Melbourne, Australia | Finland | Hard | Virág Csurgó | Anne Aallonen; Nanne Dahlman | W | 4–6, 6–4, 6–4 |
| 1988 Federation Cup; World Group Consolation Round | Second round | December 1988 | Melbourne, Australia | Brazil | Hard | Virág Csurgó | Neige Dias; Luciana Tella | L | 2–6, 6–7^{(7–9)} |
| 1989 Federation Cup; World Group | First round | October 1989 | Tokyo, Japan | Thailand | Hard | Andrea Temesvári | Tossaporn Summa; Orawan Thampensri | W | 6–3, 6–4 |
| 1989 Federation Cup; World Group | Second round | October 1989 | Tokyo, Japan | Czechoslovakia | Hard | Andrea Noszály | Jana Pospíšilová; Regina Rajchrtová | W | 6–4, 6–4 |
| 1990 Federation Cup; World Group | First round | 25 July 1990 | Norcross, United States | Hong Kong | Hard | Andrea Noszály | Ellinore Lightbody; Pang Sheung | W | 6–2, 6–4 |
| 1990 Federation Cup; World Group Consolation Round | Second round | 26 July 1990 | Norcross, Georgia, United States | China | Hard | Andrea Temesvári | Li Fang; Tang Min | W | 6–2, 5–7, 6–1 |
| 1990 Federation Cup; World Group Consolation Round | Quarterfinal | 27 July 1990 | Norcross, Georgia, United States | Luxembourg | Hard | Andrea Temesvári | Marie-Christine Goy; Karin Kschwendt | W | 6–3, 6–2 |
| 1990 Federation Cup; World Group Consolation Round | Semifinal | 28 July 1990 | Norcross, Georgia, United States | Argentina | Hard | Andrea Temesvári | Bettina Fulco; Inés Gorrochategui | W | 6–4, 6–1 |
| 1990 Federation Cup; World Group Consolation Round | Final | 29 July 1990 | Norcross, Georgia, United States | Indonesia | Hard | Andrea Temesvári | Irawati Moerid; Lukky Tedjamukti | W | 6–2, 6–1 |
