= Bettina Diesner =

Austrian tennis player

- Country (sports): Austria
- Born: 8 February 1970 (age 55)
- Prize money: $10,026

Singles
- Career record: 27–34
- Highest ranking: No. 272 (30 Jan 1989)

Doubles
- Career record: 26–20
- Career titles: 2 ITF
- Highest ranking: No. 225 (18 Jul 1988)

Bettina Diesner (born 8 February 1970) is an Austrian former professional tennis player.

Diesner competed on the international tour in the 1980s and achieved a career high singles ranking of 272 in the world.

Her best performance on the WTA Tour was a second round appearance at the 1989 Brighton Championships.

== ITF finals ==
Legend
$25,000 tournaments
$10,000 tournaments

=== Doubles: 5 (2–3) ===
Result	No.	Date	Tournament	Surface	Partner	Opponents	Score
Loss	1.	25 August 1986	Wels, Austria	Clay	(Austria) Barbara Paulus	(Hong Kong) Paulette Moreno (Austria) Karin Oberleitner	5–7, 6–7^{(4–7)}
Loss	2.	27 July 1987	Kitzbuhel, Austria	Clay	(Austria) Karin Oberleitner	(Austria) Judith Wiesner (Austria) Heidi Sprung	3–6, 4–6
Loss	3.	17 August 1987	Lisbon, Portugal	Clay	(Italy) Stefania Dalla Valle	(West Germany) Veronika Martinek (Hungary) Réka Szikszay	6–7^{(4)}, 7–6^{(5)}, 6–7^{(5)}
Win	1.	29 February 1988	Rocafort, Spain	Clay	(United Kingdom) Anne Simpkin	(Spain) Elena Guerra (Spain) Rosa Bielsa	6–3, 6–2
Win	2.	29 August 1988	Corsica, France	Clay	(Switzerland) Mareke Plocher	(Spain) Janet Souto (Spain) Rosa Bielsa	6–1, 6–4
