= Daniela Moise =

Romanian tennis player

- Country (sports): Romania
- Born: 4 December 1964 (age 61)
- Prize money: $14,247

Singles
- Career record: 26–22
- Highest ranking: No. 333 (21 December 1986)

Grand Slam singles results
- French Open: Q1 (1985)

Doubles
- Career record: 11–18
- Career titles: 1 ITF
- Highest ranking: No. 312 (28 September 1987)
Medal record
Representing Romania
Summer Universiade
Gold medal – first place	1985 Kobe	Mixed doubles

Daniela Moise (born 4 December 1964) is a Romanian former professional tennis player.

Moise was a mixed doubles gold medalist for Romania at the 1985 Summer Universiade in Kobe, with Florin Segărceanu. She was a member of Romania's Federation Cup team in 1986. Featuring in four ties, she won singles matches over Paulina Sepúlveda, Patricia Medrado and Jennifer Thornton.

== ITF finals ==
=== Singles: 2 (0–2) ===
Outcome	No.	Date	Tournament	Surface	Opponent	Score
Runner-up	1.	8 July 1984	Carpi, Italy	Clay	(Greece) Olga Tsarbopoulou	6–7, 3–6
Runner-up	2.	28 April 1985	Hatfield, United Kingdom	Hard	(Japan) Kumiko Okamoto	4–6, 2–6

=== Doubles: 2 (1–1) ===
Outcome	No.	Date	Tournament	Surface	Partner	Opponents	Score
Runner-up	1.	15 July 1984	Båstad, Sweden	Clay	(Spain) Elena Guerra	(Sweden) Helena Olsson (Sweden) Carin Anderholm	6–1, 6–7, 0–6
Winner	1.	21 June 1987	Salerno, Italy	Clay	(West Germany) Veronika Martinek	(Australia) Kate McDonald (Czechoslovakia) Hana Adámková	7–6, 6–2
