= Aila Winkler =

Croatian-American tennis player

- Full name: Aila Winkler Main
- Country (sports): Yugoslavia
- Born: 29 July 1969 (age 56)
- Plays: Right-handed
- Prize money: $2,832

Singles
- Career record: 4–19
- Highest ranking: No. 501 (6 Jun 1988)

Doubles
- Career record: 5–15
- Highest ranking: No. 425 (17 Aug 1987)

Team competitions
- Fed Cup: 4-1

Aila Winkler Main (born 29 July 1969) is a Croatian-American former professional tennis player.

Raised in Zagreb, Winkler was introduced to the sport of tennis by her parents at the age nine, later travelling to Florida to train at Harry Hopman's academy.

Winkler was ranked amongst the world's top-20 in the 18 and under age group. In 1985 and 1986, while still a junior, Winkler appeared for the Yugoslavia Federation Cup team as a doubles player, winning four of her five rubbers.

From 1989 to 1992, Winkler played collegiate tennis for Princeton University, earning First-Team All-Ivy honours for both singles and doubles. She graduated in 1992.

Winkler, who has a degree from Hastings Law School, now works as an interior designer and is based in New York.
