= Barbara Pollet =

Austrian tennis player

- Country (sports): Austria
- Born: 17 May 1963 (age 61)
- Prize money: $11,195

Singles
- Highest ranking: No. 192 (21 December 1986)

Grand Slam singles results
- French Open: Q1 (1987)

Doubles
- Highest ranking: No. 212 (2 February 1987)

Barbara Pollet (born 17 May 1963) is an Austrian former professional tennis player.

Pollet, who comes from Salzburg, played in two Federation Cup ties for Austria in 1985, against Japan and the USSR.

While competing on the professional tour she reached a career high singles ranking of 192 in the world, which was attained in 1986.

== ITF finals ==
=== Singles: 1 (0–1) ===
Result	Date	Tournament	Surface	Opponent	Score
Loss	3 August 1986	Hechingen, West Germany	Clay	(Czechoslovakia) Olga Votavová	1–6, 2–6

=== Doubles: 1 (1–0) ===
Result	Date	Tournament	Surface	Partner	Opponents	Score
Win	25 June 1989	Velden, Austria	Clay	(Austria) Birgit Arming	(Sweden) Nina Erickson (Sweden) Petra Johansson	7–5, 6–0

== See also ==
- List of Austria Fed Cup team representatives
