= Dora Rangelova =

Bulgarian tennis player

Dora Rangelova Дора Рангелова
- Country (sports): Bulgaria
- Residence: Plovdiv, Bulgaria
- Born: 3 September 1967 (age 57); Plovdiv, Bulgaria
- Plays: Right-handed (two-handed backhand)
- Prize money: US$ 4,061

Singles
- Career record: 10–9
- Career titles: 0 WTA, 0 ITF
- Highest ranking: No. 459 (15 August 1988)

Doubles
- Career record: 6–6
- Career titles: 0 WTA, 1 ITF

Team competitions
- Fed Cup: 4–7 (singles 1-2; doubles 3-5)

Dora Rangelova (Bulgarian: Дора Рангелова; born 3 September 1967) is a retired tennis player from Bulgaria. On 15 August 1988, she reached her highest WTA singles ranking of 459. She played for Bulgaria Fed Cup team for three years. Dora Rangelova is the current captain of the Bulgarian Fed Cup team. She's also the mother of tennis player Dimitar Kuzmanov.

== ITF Circuit finals ==
=== Singles: 1 (1 runner–up) ===
Legend $100,000 tournaments $75,000 tournaments $50,000 tournaments $25,000 tournaments $10,000 tournaments	Finals by surface Hard (0–0) Clay (0–1) Grass (0–0) Carpet (0–0)

Result	W–L	Date	Tournament	Tier	Surface	Opponent	Score
Loss	0–1	Mar 1989	ITF Athens, Greece	10,000	Clay	(Bulgaria) Elena Pampoulova	1–6, 7–6, 1–6

=== Doubles: 1 (1 title) ===
Legend $100,000 tournaments $75,000 tournaments $50,000 tournaments $25,000 tournaments $10,000 tournaments	Finals by surface Hard (0–0) Clay (1–0) Grass (0–0) Carpet (0–0)

Result	W–L	Date	Tournament	Tier	Surface	Partner	Opponents	Score
Win	1–0	May 1989	ITF Athens, Greece	10,000	Clay	(Bulgaria) Svetlana Krivencheva	(Australia) Lily Nejasmic (Australia) Mary Nejasmic	6–3, 6–4
