= Marie-Christine Damas =

French tennis player

- Country (sports): France
- Born: 9 December 1966 (age 58)
- Retired: 1991
- Prize money: $30,929

Singles
- Career record: 52-45
- Career titles: 2 ITF
- Highest ranking: No. 130 (5 June 1989)

Grand Slam singles results
- Australian Open: 2R (1988, 1989)
- French Open: 1R (1988)

Doubles
- Career record: 1-4
- Highest ranking: No. 440 (6 June 1988)

Marie-Christine Damas (born 9 December 1966) is a French former professional tennis player.

Damas, who comes from Brittany, reached a best ranking on tour of 130 in the world. Her best performance on the WTA Tour was a quarter-final appearance at the 1988 Clarins Open held in Paris. She twice made the second round of the Australian Open, including 1989 when she took eighth seed Claudia Kohde-Kilsch to three sets.

== ITF finals ==
=== Singles (2–1) ===
Legend
$10,000 tournaments

Result	No.	Date	Tournament	Surface	Opponent	Score
Loss	1.	1 December 1986	Vereeniging, South Africa	Hard	(South Africa) Mariaan de Swardt	2–6, 4–6
Win	2.	8 December 1986	Johannesburg, South Africa	Hard	(South Africa) Karen Schimper	6–4, 6–4
Win	3.	9 February 1987	Reims, France	Clay	(Czechoslovakia) Regina Rajchrtová	6–1, 2–6, 6–2
