= Vitosha New Otani Open =

Defunct tennis tournament
- Event name: Vitosha New Otani Open
- Tour: WTA Tour
- Founded: 1988
- Abolished: 1989
- Editions: 2
- Location: Sofia, Bulgaria
- Surface: Hard (1988); Clay (1989)

The Vitosha New Otani Open is a defunct WTA Tour affiliated tennis tournament played from 1988 to 1989. It was held in Sofia in Bulgaria and played on outdoor hard courts in 1988 and on outdoor clay courts in 1989.

== finals ==
=== Singles ===
Year	Champions	Runners-up	Score
1988	(Spain) Conchita Martínez	(Austria) Barbara Paulus	6–1, 6–2
1989	(West Germany) Isabel Cueto	(Bulgaria) Katerina Maleeva	6–2, 7–6

=== Doubles ===
Year	Champions	Runners-up	Score
1988	(Spain) Conchita Martínez (Austria) Barbara Paulus	(Socialist Federal Republic of Yugoslavia) Sabrina Goleš (Bulgaria) Katerina Maleeva	1–6, 6–1, 6–4
1989	(Italy) Laura Garrone (Italy) Laura Golarsa	(West Germany) Silke Meier (Bulgaria) Elena Pampoulova	6–4, 7–5

== See also ==
- Sofia Open – men's tournament (1980–1981)
