= Barbara Paulus =

Austrian tennis player

- Country (sports): Austria
- Residence: Hinterbrühl
- Born: 1 September 1970 (age 56) Vienna, Austria
- Height: 1.77 m (5 ft 9 1/2 in)
- Turned pro: July 1986
- Retired: 2001
- Plays: Right-handed (two handed-backhand)
- Prize money: $1,294,445

Singles
- Career record: 280–166
- Career titles: 6
- Highest ranking: No. 10 (18 November 1996)

Grand Slam singles results
- Australian Open: 4R (1990, 1995)
- French Open: 4R (1997)
- Wimbledon: 2R (1995, 1997)
- US Open: 4R (1989, 1990)

Other tournaments
- Tour Finals: RR (1990, 1996)
- Olympic Games: 3R (1988)

Doubles
- Career record: 26–43
- Career titles: 1
- Highest ranking: No. 83 (17 July 1989)

Grand Slam doubles results
- Australian Open: 2R (1990)
- French Open: 1R (1989)
- Wimbledon: 1R (1990)
- US Open: 1R (1989, 1990)

Team competitions
- Fed Cup: Record 9–13

Barbara Paulus (born 1 September 1970) is a former professional tennis player from Austria. She began playing on the WTA Tour in 1986 and retired in 2001. During her career, she won a total of seven WTA tournaments (six singles titles, one doubles title). Paulus competed for the Austria Fed Cup team on 21 occasions in singles and doubles, winning nine of her 22 matches.

== Career ==
Paulus is one of the most successful Austrian female tennis players, being one of only two to be ranked in the top 10 (along with Barbara Schett), despite having a career plagued with injuries. She won six singles titles and one doubles title on the WTA Tour. Her best results include victories over Chris Evert, Mary Pierce, Gabriela Sabatini, Conchita Martínez, and Jana Novotná.

After reaching as high as No. 12 in the world in 1990, she sustained injuries to her knee and both wrists which required her to have surgery and kept her sidelined for many months through 1992 and 1993. Her comeback from injury eventually bore her much success, with four WTA titles between 1995 and 1997, a top-ten ranking, and reaching her biggest career final at the Tier I Family Circle Cup, where she lost in three sets to Arantxa Sánchez Vicario.

Her career effectively ended in 1998 after an elbow injury, though she made a brief return in 2001.

== Awards ==
- 1990: Golden Needle Award from Austrian Tennis Federation

== WTA career finals ==
=== Singles: 17 (6 titles, 11 runner-ups) ===
Legend Grand Slam (–) WTA Tour Championships (–) Tier I (0–1) Tier II (0–1) Tier III (2–5), IV (3–2), V (1–2)	Finals by surface Hard (1–4) Grass (–) Clay (5–5) Carpet (0–2)

Result	W–L	Date	Tournament	Tier	Surface	Opponent	Score
Win	1–0	May 1988	Geneva, Switzerland	Tier V	Clay	(United States) Lori McNeil	6–4, 5–7, 6–1
Loss	1–1	Aug 1988	Sofia, Bulgaria	Tier V	Hard	(Spain) Conchita Martínez	6–1, 6–2
Loss	1–2	Jul 1989	Arcachon, Spain	Tier V	Clay	(Austria) Judith Wiesner	6–3, 6–7^{(3–7)}, 6–1
Loss	1–3	Jan 1990	Sydney, Australia	Tier III	Hard	(Soviet Union) Natasha Zvereva	4–6, 6–1, 6–3
Win	2–3	May 1990	Geneva, Switzerland (2)	Tier IV	Clay	(Canada) Helen Kelesi	2–6, 7–5, 7–6^{(7–3)}
Loss	2–4	Jul 1990	Palermo, Italy	Tier IV	Clay	(West Germany) Isabel Cueto	6–2, 6–3
Loss	2–5	Oct 1990	Filderstadt, Germany	Tier II	Hard (i)	(United States) Mary Joe Fernández	6–1, 6–3
Win	3–5	Sep 1995	Warsaw, Poland	Tier III	Clay	(France) Alexandra Fusai	7–6^{(7–4)}, 4–6, 6–1
Win	4–5	Nov 1995	Pattaya, Thailand	Tier IV	Hard	(China) Yi Jingqian	6–4, 6–3
Loss	4–6	Jan 1996	Auckland, New Zealand	Tier IV	Hard	(United States) Sandra Cacic	6–3, 1–6, 6–4
Loss	4–7	Apr 1996	Hilton Head Island, US	Tier I	Clay	(Spain) Arantxa Sánchez Vicario	6–2, 2–6, 6–2
Loss	4–8	May 1996	Strasbourg, France	Tier III	Clay	(United States) Lindsay Davenport	6–3, 7–6^{(8–6)}
Win	5–8	Aug 1996	Maria Lankowitz, Austria	Tier IV	Clay	(Italy) Sandra Cecchini	0–0 ret.
Loss	5–9	Sep 1996	Warsaw, Poland	Tier III	Clay	(Slovakia) Henrieta Nagyová	3–6, 6–2, 6–1
Loss	5–10	Oct 1996	Moscow, Russia	Tier III	Carpet (i)	(Spain) Conchita Martínez	6–1, 4–6, 6–4
Win	6–10	Jul 1997	Warsaw, Poland	Tier III	Clay	(Slovakia) Henrieta Nagyová	6–4, 6–4
Loss	6–11	Oct 1997	Luxembourg City, Luxembourg	Tier III	Carpet (i)	(South Africa) Amanda Coetzer	6–4, 3–6, 7–5

=== Doubles: 1 (1–0) ===
Winner – Legend' Grand Slam tournaments (0–0) WTA Tour Championships (0–0) Tier I (0–0) Tier II (0–0) Tier III (0–0) Tier IV (0–0) Tier V (1–0)	Finals by surface Hard (1–0) Grass (0–0) Clay (0–0) Carpet (0–0)

Result	W/L	Date	Tournament	Tier	Surface	Partner	Opponents	Score
Win	1–0	Aug 1988	Sofia, Bulgaria	Tier V	Hard	(Spain) Conchita Martínez	(Socialist Federal Republic of Yugoslavia) Sabrina Goleš (Bulgaria) Katerina Maleeva	1–6, 6–1, 6–4

== ITF finals ==
$100,000 tournaments
$75,000 tournaments
$50,000 tournaments
$25,000 tournaments
$10,000 tournaments

=== Singles (2–3) ===
Result	No.	Date	Tournament	Surface	Opponent	Score
Win	1.	16 November 1987	Wels, Austria	Hard (i)	(Czechoslovakia) Denisa Krajčovičová	6–2, 6–2
Loss	1.	27 September 1993	Kirchheim, Austria	Clay	(Belgium) Laurence Courtois	1–6, 3–6
Win	2.	29 August 1994	Maribor, Slovenia	Hard (i)	(Germany) Maja Živec-Škulj	4–6, 6–4, 6–0
Loss	2.	4 March 1996	Prostějov, Czech Republic	Hard (i)	(Switzerland) Martina Hingis	1–6, 4–6
Loss	3.	27 January 1996	Prostějov, Czech Republic	Carpet (i)	(Slovakia) Karina Habšudová	7–6^{(9–7)}, 1–6, 3–6

=== Doubles (0–2) ===
Result	No.	Date	Tournament	Surface	Partner	Opponents	Score
Loss	1.	25 August 1986	Wels, Austria	Clay	(Austria) Bettina Diesner	(Hong Kong) Paulette Moreno (Austria) Karin Oberleitner	5–7, 6–7^{(4–7)}
Loss	2.	16 November 1987	Wels, Austria	Hard (i)	(Austria) Petra Schwarz	(Austria) Petra Hentschl (West Germany) Eva-Maria Schürhoff	4–6, 4–6
