= 1986 Wimbledon Championships – Women's singles qualifying =

Women's singles qualifying
- 1986 Wimbledon Championships

Events
Singles	men	women		boys	girls
Doubles	men	women	mixed	boys	girls
WC Singles	men	women	quad
WC Doubles	men	women	quad
Legends	men	women	seniors

Qualification
Singles	men	women
Doubles	men	women	mixed
- Wimbledon Championships

Players and pairs who neither have high enough rankings nor receive wild cards may participate in a qualifying tournament held one week before the annual Wimbledon Tennis Championships.

== Qualifiers ==
1. (South Africa) Dinky Van Rensburg
2. (United States) Diane Farrell
3. (New Zealand) Julie Richardson
4. (United States) Kay McDaniel
5. (Czechoslovakia) Jana Novotná
6. (United States) Gretchen Rush
7. (United States) Anna-Maria Fernandez
8. (United States) Kim Steinmetz

== Lucky losers ==
1. (Australia) Rebecca Bryant
2. (United States) Jane Forman
3. (United States) Ronni Reis
4. (United States) Penny Barg

== Qualifying draw ==
=== First qualifier ===
First round
(West Germany) Claudia Porwik	6	7	6
(South Africa) Dinky Van Rensburg	7	5	4
(United States) Caryn Copeland	3	3
(United Kingdom) Judy Rich	6	6
(Italy) Laura Golarsa	1	7	6
(United States) Paula Smith	6	6	2
(Australia) Rebecca Bryant	6	6
(Japan) Akiko Kijimuta	2	3

Second round
(South Africa) Dinky Van Rensburg	6	6
(United Kingdom) Judy Rich	2	0
(Italy) Laura Golarsa	7	2	4
(Australia) Rebecca Bryant	6	6	6

Qualifying competition
(South Africa) Dinky Van Rensburg	7	6
(Australia) Rebecca Bryant	6	1

=== Second qualifier ===
First round
(Brazil) Cláudia Monteiro	6	4	7
(United States) Diane Farrell	4	6	9
(Italy) Sabina Simmonds	6	7
(Australia) Jackie Masters	2	6
(Australia) Michelle Jaggard	6	6
(Sweden) Anna-Karin Olsson	3	1
(Sweden) Elisabeth Ekblom	1	6	6
(West Germany) Silke Meier	6	4	4

Second round
(United States) Diane Farrell	3	7	8
(Italy) Sabina Simmonds	6	5	6
(Australia) Michelle Jaggard	4	4
(Sweden) Elisabeth Ekblom	6	6

Qualifying competition
(United States) Diane Farrell	6	4	11
(Sweden) Elisabeth Ekblom	1	6	9

=== Third qualifier ===
First round
(New Zealand) Julie Richardson	6	6
(Brazil) Gisele Miró	2	4
(United Kingdom) Caroline Billingham	1	1
(Australia) Lisa O'Neill	6	6
(Soviet Union) Natasha Zvereva	6	4
(United States) Cammy MacGregor	7	6
(France) Cécille Calmette	5	2
(Sweden) Helena Dahlström	7	6

Second round
(New Zealand) Julie Richardson	7	2	6
(Australia) Lisa O'Neill	5	6	3
(United States) Cammy MacGregor	6	7
(Sweden) Helena Dahlström	4	6

Qualifying competition
(New Zealand) Julie Richardson	6	6
(United States) Cammy MacGregor	1	2

=== Fourth qualifier ===
First round
(United States) Jane Forman	3	6	6
(United Kingdom) Sarah Sullivan	6	3	1
(United Kingdom) Jane Wood	6	6
(France) Nathalie Phan-Thanh	4	2
(United States) Kay McDaniel	6	1	6
(United States) Jamie Golder	4	6	2
(United Kingdom) Lorrayne Gracie	2	3
(Sweden) Maria Lindström	6	6

Second round
(United States) Jane Forman	6	3	9
(United Kingdom) Jane Wood	1	6	7
(United States) Kay McDaniel	7	6
(Sweden) Maria Lindström	6	4

Qualifying competition
(United States) Jane Forman	3	3
(United States) Kay McDaniel	6	6

=== Fifth qualifier ===
First round
(United States) Marianne Werdel	5	6	6
(United Kingdom) Sally Timms	7	1	3
(New Zealand) Michelle Parun	7	2	5
(United States) Ronni Reis	5	6	7
(Czechoslovakia) Jana Novotná	6	6
(Switzerland) Csilla Bartos-Cserepy	1	2
(United States) Heather Ludloff	4	7	4
(Argentina) Patricia Tarabini	6	6	6

Second round
(United States) Marianne Werdel	2	2
(United States) Ronni Reis	6	6
(Czechoslovakia) Jana Novotná	6	7
(Argentina) Patricia Tarabini	2	6

Qualifying competition
(United States) Ronni Reis	7	2	6
(Czechoslovakia) Jana Novotná	6	6	8

=== Sixth qualifier ===
First round
(Sweden) Catarina Lindqvist	1	1
(Czechoslovakia) Hana Fukárková	6	6
(United States) Gretchen Rush	6	6
(Australia) Karen Deed	3	1
(United States) Jenni Goodling	6	1
(France) Pascale Etchemendy	7	6
(Republic of Ireland) Jo Griffiths	2	5
(Australia) Louise Field	6	7

Second round
(Czechoslovakia) Hana Fukárková	2	5
(United States) Gretchen Rush	6	7
(France) Pascale Etchemendy	6	6	6
(Australia) Louise Field	7	2	4

Qualifying competition
(United States) Gretchen Rush	6	6
(France) Pascale Etchemendy	1	3

=== Seventh qualifier ===
First round
(United States) Anna-Maria Fernandez	6	6
(France) Emmanuelle Derly	1	3
(United Kingdom) Teresa Catlin	7	5	4
(Australia) Colleen Carney	5	7	6
(Australia) Stephanie Faulkner	6	6
(United States) Joy Cummings	0	4
(Japan) Emiko Okagawa	4	4
(United States) Penny Barg	6	6

Second round
(United States) Anna-Maria Fernandez	6	6
(Australia) Colleen Carney	3	1
(Australia) Stephanie Faulkner	2	4
(United States) Penny Barg	6	6

Qualifying competition
(United States) Anna-Maria Fernandez	6	7
(United States) Penny Barg	2	5

=== Eighth qualifier ===
First round
(France) Sophie Amiach	4	1
(United States) Kim Steinmetz	6	6
(Netherlands) Hellas ter Riet	3	3
(United States) Louise Allen	6	6
(Australia) Nicole Provis	6	6	4
(France) Corinne Vanier	7	4	6
(Sweden) Cecilia Dahlman	0	6	2
(Japan) Masako Yanagi	6	4	6

Second round
(United States) Kim Steinmetz	4	6	6
(United States) Louise Allen	6	4	2
(France) Corinne Vanier	3	6	6
(Japan) Masako Yanagi	6	4	3

Qualifying competition
(United States) Kim Steinmetz	4	6	6
(France) Corinne Vanier	6	1	2
