= 1986 Wimbledon Championships – Women's doubles qualifying =

Women's doubles qualifying
- 1986 Wimbledon Championships

Events
Singles	men	women		boys	girls
Doubles	men	women	mixed	boys	girls
WC Singles	men	women	quad
WC Doubles	men	women	quad
Legends	men	women	seniors

Qualification
Singles	men	women
Doubles	men	women	mixed
- Wimbledon Championships

Players and pairs who neither have high enough rankings nor receive wild cards may participate in a qualifying tournament held one week before the annual Wimbledon Tennis Championships.

== Qualifiers ==
1. (United States) Barbara Gerken / (South Africa) Dianne Van Rensburg
2. (Australia) Amanda Tobin-Dingwall / (United States) Lisa Spain Short
3. (Brazil) Gisele Miró / (Argentina) Patricia Tarabini
4. (Australia) Karen Deed / (Australia) Nicole Provis

== Lucky losers ==
1. (United States) Jamie Golder / (United States) Susan Pendo
2. (Australia) Michelle Jaggard / (United States) Jaime Kaplan
3. (United States) Cammy MacGregor / (United States) Cynthia MacGregor

== Qualifying draw ==
=== First qualifier ===
First round
(United Kingdom) Glynis Coles (United Kingdom) Denise Parnell	5	6	6
(United Kingdom) Teresa Catlin (United Kingdom) Karen Hunter	7	3	4
(Sweden) Helena Dahlström (Sweden) Anna-Karin Olsson	6	6
(United Kingdom) Jane Plackett (United Kingdom) Debbie Parker	0	1
(United Kingdom) Linda Geeves (United Kingdom) Sally Reeves	4	1
(United States) Jane Forman (United States) Kris Kinney	6	6

Second round
(United States) Barbara Gerken (South Africa) Dianne Van Rensburg	6	6
(United Kingdom) Glynis Coles (United Kingdom) Denise Parnell	2	0
(Sweden) Helena Dahlström (Sweden) Anna-Karin Olsson	3	7	4
(United States) Jane Forman (United States) Kris Kinney	6	5	6

Qualifying competition
(United States) Barbara Gerken (South Africa) Dianne Van Rensburg	6	6
(United States) Jane Forman (United States) Kris Kinney	2	3

=== Second qualifier ===
First round
(Czechoslovakia) Hana Fukárková (Czechoslovakia) Jana Novotná	4	6	2
(Australia) Amanda Tobin-Dingwall (United States) Lisa Spain Short	6	4	6
(Australia) Jackie Masters (New Zealand) Michelle Parun	w/o
(United Kingdom) Alison Grant; S. Thompson
(France) Emmanuelle Derly (France) Corinne Vanier	6	4	4
(United Kingdom) Katie Rickett (United Kingdom) Sally Timms	2	6	6
(Soviet Union) Leila Meskhi (Soviet Union) Natasha Zvereva	2	1
(Australia) Michelle Jaggard (United States) Jaime Kaplan	6	6

Second round
(Australia) Amanda Tobin-Dingwall (United States) Lisa Spain Short	6	6
(Australia) Jackie Masters (New Zealand) Michelle Parun	4	2
(United Kingdom) Katie Rickett (United Kingdom) Sally Timms	7	4	0
(Australia) Michelle Jaggard (United States) Jaime Kaplan	5	6	6

Qualifying competition
(Australia) Amanda Tobin-Dingwall (United States) Lisa Spain Short	6	6
(Australia) Michelle Jaggard (United States) Jaime Kaplan	4	3

=== Third qualifier ===
First round
(Japan) Emiko Okagawa (Japan) Naoko Sato	7^{8}	5	4
(Australia) Stephanie Faulkner; A. Smith	6^{6}	7	6
(United Kingdom) Jackie Holden (United Kingdom) Clare Pollard	2	0
L. Browne; T. Price	6	6
(Brazil) Gisele Miró (Argentina) Patricia Tarabini	6	6
(United Kingdom) Caroline Billingham (United Kingdom) Charlotte Clarke	2	4
(United States) Beverly Bowes (United States) Caroline Kuhlman	6	2	7
(Australia) Rebecca Bryant (Australia) Louise Field	2	6	5

Second round
(Australia) Stephanie Faulkner; A. Smith	w/o
L. Browne; T. Price
(Brazil) Gisele Miró (Argentina) Patricia Tarabini	6	6
(United States) Beverly Bowes (United States) Caroline Kuhlman	3	3

Qualifying competition
(Australia) Stephanie Faulkner; A. Smith	2	2
(Brazil) Gisele Miró (Argentina) Patricia Tarabini	6	6

=== Fourth qualifier ===
First round
(Australia) Colleen Carney; C. O'Neill	2	1
(Australia) Karen Deed (Australia) Nicole Provis	6	6
(France) Cécille Calmette (France) Pascale Etchemendy	3	6	6
(United Kingdom) Lisa Gould (United Kingdom) Sarah Sullivan	6	4	3
(South Africa) Linda Barnard (South Africa) Paulette Roux	2	5
(United States) Jamie Golder (United States) Susan Pendo	6	7

Second round
(Australia) Karen Deed (Australia) Nicole Provis	6	6
(France) Cécille Calmette (France) Pascale Etchemendy	3	1
(United States) Jamie Golder (United States) Susan Pendo	4	6^{9}
(United States) Cammy MacGregor (United States) Cynthia MacGregor	6	7^{11}

Qualifying competition
(Australia) Karen Deed (Australia) Nicole Provis	6	6
(United States) Cammy MacGregor (United States) Cynthia MacGregor	3	3
