= 1986 Wimbledon Championships – Women's singles =

Women's singles
- 1986 Wimbledon Championships

Final
- Champion: (United States) Martina Navratilova
- Runner-up: (Czechoslovakia) Hana Mandlíková
- Score: 7–6^{(7–1)}, 6–3

Details
- Draw: 128 (8 Q / 8 WC )
- Seeds: 16

Events
Singles	men	women		boys	girls
Doubles	men	women	mixed	boys	girls
WC Singles	men	women	quad
WC Doubles	men	women	quad
Legends	men	women	seniors
← 1985 ·	Wimbledon Championships	· 1987 →

Four-time defending champion Martina Navratilova defeated Hana Mandlíková in the final, 7–6^{(7–1)}, 6–3 to win the ladies' singles tennis title at the 1986 Wimbledon Championships. It was her seventh Wimbledon singles title and 14th major singles title overall. For the third time in her career, Navratilova did not lose a set during the tournament. Mandlíková was attempting to complete the career Grand Slam.

This marked the first Wimbledon appearance of future champion Jana Novotná. She was defeated by Susan Mascarin in the first round.

== Seeds ==
1. (United States) Martina Navratilova (champion)
2. (United States) Chris Evert Lloyd (semifinals)
3. (Czechoslovakia) Hana Mandlíková (final)
4. (West Germany) Claudia Kohde-Kilsch (third round)
5. (United States) Pam Shriver (first round)
6. (United States) Kathy Rinaldi (first round)
7. (Czechoslovakia) Helena Suková (quarterfinals)
8. (Bulgaria) Manuela Maleeva (fourth round)
9. (United States) Zina Garrison (second round)
10. (Argentina) Gabriela Sabatini (semifinals)
11. (Canada) Carling Bassett (fourth round)
12. (United States) Stephanie Rehe (first round)
13. (United States) Barbara Potter (withdrew)
14. (Australia) Wendy Turnbull (first round)
15. (Sweden) Catarina Lindqvist (quarterfinals)
16. (United States) Kathy Jordan (fourth round)

Click on the seed number of a player to go to their draw section.

Steffi Graf was originally seeded #3 but withdrew due to illness before the tournament draw was made. All original seeds from 4-16 moved up one place, and a new #16 seed was added.

Barbara Potter withdrew due to injury. She was replaced in the draw by lucky loser Ronni Reis.

== Draw ==
=== Key ===
- Q = Qualifier
- WC = Wild card
- LL = Lucky loser
- Alt = Alternate
- ITF = ITF entry
- PR = Protected ranking
- SR = Special ranking
- SE = Special exempt
- JE = Junior exempt
- JR = Junior Accelerator Programme entrant
- CO = College Accelerator Programme entrant
- NG = Next Gen Accelerator Program entrant
- w/o = Walkover
- r = Retired
- d = Defaulted

=== Finals ===
Quarterfinals
1	(United States) Martina Navratilova	6	6
(West Germany) Bettina Bunge	1	3
10	(Argentina) Gabriela Sabatini	6	6
15	(Sweden) Catarina Lindqvist	2	3
(United States) Lori McNeil	7	0	2
3	(Czechoslovakia) Hana Mandlíková	6	6	6
7	(Czechoslovakia) Helena Suková	6	6	4
2	(United States) Chris Evert Lloyd	7	4	6

Semifinals
1	(United States) Martina Navratilova	6	6
10	(Argentina) Gabriela Sabatini	2	2
3	(Czechoslovakia) Hana Mandlíková	7	7
2	(United States) Chris Evert Lloyd	6	5

Final
1	(United States) Martina Navratilova	7^{7}	6
3	(Czechoslovakia) Hana Mandlíková	6^{1}	3

=== Top half ===
==== Section 1 ====
First round
1	(United States) M Navratilova	6	6
(Australia) A Tobin-Dingwall	3	2
(West Germany) E Pfaff	5	4
LL	(United States) J Forman	7	6
WC	(United Kingdom) S Reeves	6	4	2
(United States) K Kinney	3	6	6
(United Kingdom) S Gomer	4	7	6
(United States) A White	6	5	4
(United States) S Sloane	6	6
(United States) M Torres	3	4
(United States) T Phelps	6	6
WC	(United Kingdom) A Grunfeld	2	0
(France) I Demongeot	6	6
(Australia) J Thompson	1	2
(Australia) J Byrne	7	6
14	(Australia) W Turnbull	6	2

Second round
1	(United States) M Navratilova	6	6
LL	(United States) J Forman	0	4
(United States) K Kinney	2	7	6
(United Kingdom) S Gomer	6	6	3
(United States) S Sloane	4	2
(United States) T Phelps	6	6
(France) I Demongeot	6	6
(Australia) J Byrne	4	1

Third round
1	(United States) M Navratilova	6	6
(United States) K Kinney	0	2
(United States) T Phelps	3	2
(France) I Demongeot	6	6

Fourth round
1	(United States) M Navratilova	6	6
(France) I Demongeot	3	3

==== Section 2 ====
First round
12	(United States) S Rehe	6	4	6
(Soviet Union) L Savchenko	1	6	8
(West Germany) B Bunge	4	6	6
(Puerto Rico) G Fernández	6	4	1
(United States) P Fendick	6	6
(United States) E Herr	3	1
(United States) M-L Piatek	6	6
LL	(United States) P Barg	0	1
Q	(South Africa) D Van Rensburg	3	2
(Australia) E Smylie	6	6
(United States) W White	6	6
(South Africa) E Reinach	4	1
(United States) S Mascarin	3	7	6
Q	(Czechoslovakia) J Novotná	6	6	2
(United States) K Gompert	2	0^{r}
8	(Bulgaria) M Maleeva	6	1

Second round
(Soviet Union) L Savchenko	7	0	5
(West Germany) B Bunge	6	6	7
(United States) P Fendick	6	6
(United States) M-L Piatek	0	3
(Australia) E Smylie	6	1	12
(United States) W White	1	6	10
(United States) S Mascarin	4	6
8	(Bulgaria) M Maleeva	6	7

Third round
(West Germany) B Bunge	6	6
(United States) P Fendick	2	3
(Australia) E Smylie	6	1
8	(Bulgaria) M Maleeva	7	6

Fourth round
(West Germany) B Bunge	3	6	6
8	(Bulgaria) M Maleeva	6	2	3

==== Section 3 ====
First round
4	(West Germany) C Kohde-Kilsch	0	6	6
(Japan) E Inoue	6	1	2
(United States) A Moulton	7	6
(Czechoslovakia) K Böhmová	6	4
(United States) N Hu	6	6
WC	(United Kingdom) J Louis	0	2
(Sweden) C Karlsson	7	0	1
(Italy) R Reggi	5	6	6
(Italy) A-M Cecchini	1	2
Q	(United States) A-M Fernandez	6	6
(United States) D Spence	3	2
(United States) B Gerken	6	6
(Brazil) P Medrado	4	6	4
(France) C Suire	6	3	6
(Switzerland) C Jolissaint	2	6	4
10	(Argentina) G Sabatini	6	1	6

Second round
4	(West Germany) C Kohde-Kilsch	6	6
(United States) A Moulton	2	2
(United States) N Hu	2	4
(Italy) R Reggi	6	6
Q	(United States) A-M Fernandez	7	6	4
(United States) B Gerken	5	7	6
(France) C Suire	3	3
10	(Argentina) G Sabatini	6	6

Third round
4	(West Germany) C Kohde-Kilsch	4	1
(Italy) R Reggi	6	6
(United States) B Gerken	2	1
10	(Argentina) G Sabatini	6	6

Fourth round
(Italy) R Reggi	4	6	3
10	(Argentina) G Sabatini	6	1	6

==== Section 4 ====
First round
15	(Sweden) C Lindqvist	3	7	6
Q	(United States) G Rush	6	5	3
(United States) A Smith	6	3	3
(Canada) H Kelesi	4	6	6
(United States) M Van Nostrand	3	2
(South Africa) J Mundel	6	6
(Australia) E Minter	6	3	6
Q	(United States) D Farrell	1	6	1
(South Africa) Y Vermaak	4	3
(Australia) D Balestrat	6	6
(United States) N Sodupe	3	4
(United States) C Reynolds	6	6
(United Kingdom) J Durie	6	1	8
(Czechoslovakia) R Maršíková	3	6	6
(France) N Herreman	7	6
6	(United States) K Rinaldi	6	4

Second round
15	(Sweden) C Lindqvist	6	3	6
(Canada) H Kelesi	3	6	1
(South Africa) J Mundel	4	1
(Australia) E Minter	6	6
(Australia) D Balestrat	6	6
(United States) C Reynolds	2	3
(United Kingdom) J Durie	6	7
(France) N Herreman	3	5

Third round
15	(Sweden) C Lindqvist	3	7	6
(Australia) E Minter	6	6	3
(Australia) D Balestrat	5	6	6
(United Kingdom) J Durie	7	3	2

Fourth round
15	(Sweden) C Lindqvist	7	7
(Australia) D Balestrat	6	5

=== Bottom half ===
==== Section 5 ====
First round
5	(United States) P Shriver	6	3	4
(United States) E Nagelsen	4	6	6
(West Germany) S Hanika	6	2	4
(United States) L Spain-Short	3	6	6
(Bulgaria) K Maleeva	6	6
(Argentina) M Paz	3	2
(France) N Tauziat	6	6
(United States) V Nelson-Dunbar	1	2
LL	(Australia) R Bryant	4	3
(United States) L McNeil	6	6
(Netherlands) M Mesker	6	6
(Peru) L Gildemeister	3	1
(Soviet Union) S Parkhomenko	0	2
(United States) E Burgin	6	6
(United Kingdom) A Brown	1	6	5
LL	(United States) R Reis	6	3	7

Second round
(United States) E Nagelsen	6	7
(United States) L Spain-Short	1	6
(Bulgaria) K Maleeva	6	6
(France) N Tauziat	4	2
(United States) L McNeil	4
(Netherlands) M Mesker	5^{r}
(United States) E Burgin	6	7
LL	(United States) R Reis	1	5

Third round
(United States) E Nagelsen	6	6
(Bulgaria) K Maleeva	4	1
(United States) L McNeil	6	6
(United States) E Burgin	3	2

Fourth round
(United States) E Nagelsen	5	1
(United States) L McNeil	7	6

==== Section 6 ====
First round
11	(Canada) C Bassett	1	7	6
WC	(United Kingdom) G Coles	6	5	1
(South Africa) R Fairbank	6	6
(United States) M Louie Harper	4	2
(United Kingdom) A Croft	6	2	4
(Brazil) N Dias	1	6	6
(Italy) L Garrone	4	6	0
(France) M-C Calleja	6	3	6
(United States) C Benjamin	1	6	6
(France) P Paradis	6	3	2
(Czechoslovakia) I Budařová	6	6
(Socialist Federal Republic of Yugoslavia) S Goleš	1	2
(United States) C Kuhlman	6	4	6
(France) C Tanvier	2	6	8
WC	(United Kingdom) J Tacon	1	1
3	(Czechoslovakia) H Mandlíková	6	6

Second round
11	(Canada) C Bassett	6	7
(South Africa) R Fairbank	1	6
(Brazil) N Dias	2	4
(France) M-C Calleja	6	6
(United States) C Benjamin	6	6
(Czechoslovakia) I Budařová	7	7
(France) C Tanvier	5	2
3	(Czechoslovakia) H Mandlíková	7	6

Third round
11	(Canada) C Bassett	6	6
(France) M-C Calleja	4	2
(Czechoslovakia) I Budařová	2	0
3	(Czechoslovakia) H Mandlíková	6	6

Fourth round
11	(Canada) C Bassett	4	6
3	(Czechoslovakia) H Mandlíková	6	7

==== Section 7 ====
First round
7	(Czechoslovakia) H Suková	6	6
WC	(United Kingdom) D Parnell	1	1
(West Germany) A Betzner	6	7
WC	(United Kingdom) J Salmon	0	6
(Greece) A Kanellopoulou	2	0
(Australia) A Minter	6	6
(Socialist Federal Republic of Yugoslavia) M Jaušovec	6	4	4
(United States) L Bonder	3	6	6
(United States) G Kim	3	2
(Czechoslovakia) A Holíková	6	6
(United States) R White	6	6
(United States) K Sands	3	4
WC	(United Kingdom) B Borneo	0	6	4
(United Kingdom) A Hobbs	6	2	6
(United States) B Bowes	1	4
9	(United States) Z Garrison	6	6

Second round
7	(Czechoslovakia) H Suková	6	6
(West Germany) A Betzner	2	1
(Australia) A Minter	3	6	6
(United States) L Bonder	6	2	2
(Czechoslovakia) A Holíková	1	3
(United States) R White	6	6
(United Kingdom) A Hobbs	6	0	6
9	(United States) Z Garrison	4	6	4

Third round
7	(Czechoslovakia) H Suková	6	6
(Australia) A Minter	1	4
(United States) R White	6	6
(United Kingdom) A Hobbs	4	2

Fourth round
7	(Czechoslovakia) H Suková	6	6
(United States) R White	3	0

==== Section 8 ====
First round
16	(United States) K Jordan	6	6
(United States) T Mochizuki	1	3
(United States) A Henricksson	7	6
Q	(New Zealand) J Richardson	6	1
(United States) M Gurney	6	6	6
(New Zealand) B Cordwell	0	7	0
(United States) L Antonoplis	2	4
(Denmark) T Scheuer-Larsen	6	6
Q	(United States) K Steinmetz	1	5
(United States) K Horvath	6	7
Q	(United States) K McDaniel	4	6	4
(Argentina) A Villagrán	6	2	6
(Austria) P Huber	0	0
(United States) P Casale	6	6
(United States) MJ Fernández	4	1
2	(United States) C Evert Lloyd	6	6

Second round
16	(United States) K Jordan	6	6
(United States) A Henricksson	1	1
(United States) M Gurney	6	6
(Denmark) T Scheuer-Larsen	4	2
(United States) K Horvath	6	6
(Argentina) A Villagrán	4	4
(United States) P Casale	0	7	1
2	(United States) C Evert Lloyd	6	5	6

Third round
16	(United States) K Jordan	6	6
(United States) M Gurney	4	1
(United States) K Horvath	4	1
2	(United States) C Evert Lloyd	6	6

Fourth round
16	(United States) K Jordan	5	2
2	(United States) C Evert Lloyd	7	6

Preceded by 1986 French Open – Women's singles	Grand Slam women's singles	Succeeded by 1986 US Open – Women's singles
