= Michelle Parun =

New Zealand tennis player

- Country (sports): New Zealand
- Born: 2 November 1966 (age 60)
- Prize money: US$ 16,398

Singles
- Highest ranking: No. 222 (30 Mar 1987)

Grand Slam singles results
- Wimbledon: Q1 (1986)

Doubles
- Highest ranking: No. 236 (28 Sep 1987)

Grand Slam doubles results
- Wimbledon: Q2 (1986)

Michelle Parun (born 2 November 1966) is a New Zealand former professional tennis player.

Active on tour in the 1980s, Parun was a junior doubles finalist at the 1984 Australian Open (with Jackie Masters) and reached a best singles ranking of 222 in the world. She made WTA Tour main draw appearances at the Auckland Open and featured in the qualifying draw of the 1986 Wimbledon Championships.

Parun is a niece of tennis player Onny Parun.
