= 1986 French Open – Women's singles =

Women's singles
- 1986 French Open

Final
- Champion: (United States) Chris Evert-Lloyd
- Runner-up: (United States) Martina Navratilova
- Score: 2–6, 6–3, 6–3

Details
- Seeds: 16

Events
Singles	men	women		boys	girls
Doubles	men	women	mixed	boys	girls
WC Singles	men	women	quad
WC Doubles	men	women	quad
Legends	−45	45+	women
- French Open

Defending champion Chris Evert defeated Martina Navratilova in a rematch of the previous two years' finals, 2–6, 6–3, 6–3 to win the women's singles tennis title at the 1986 French Open. It was her seventh French Open singles title and 18th and last major singles title overall, an Open Era record. This also marked the 13th consecutive year in which Evert won a major, another Open Era record. It was the pair's 14th and last meeting in a major final.

== Seeds ==
The seeded players are listed below. Chris Evert is the champion; others show the round in which they were eliminated.

1. (United States) Martina Navratilova (finalist)
2. (United States) Chris Evert-Lloyd (champion)
3. (West Germany) Steffi Graf (quarterfinals)
4. (West Germany) Claudia Kohde-Kilsch (fourth round)
5. (Czechoslovakia) Hana Mandlíková (semifinals)
6. (Czechoslovakia) Helena Suková (semifinals)
7. (United States) Kathy Rinaldi (quarterfinals)
8. (Bulgaria) Manuela Maleeva (third round)
9. (Argentina) Gabriela Sabatini (fourth round)
10. (United States) Zina Garrison (third round)
11. (United States) Kathy Jordan (first round)
12. (Sweden) Catarina Lindqvist (fourth round)
13. (Canada) Carling Bassett (quarterfinals)
14. (Hungary) Andrea Temesvári (second round)
15. (United States) Anne White (first round)
16. (United States) Terry Phelps (third round)

== Draw ==
Key

- Q = Qualifier
- WC = Wild card
- LL = Lucky loser
- Alt = Alternate
- ITF = ITF entry
- PR = Protected ranking
- SR = Special ranking
- SE = Special exempt
- JE = Junior exempt
- JR = Junior Accelerator Programme entrant
- CO = College Accelerator Programme entrant
- NG = Next Gen Accelerator Program entrant
- w/o = Walkover
- r = Retired
- d = Defaulted

=== Finals ===
Quarterfinals
1	(United States) Martina Navratilova	7	6
7	(United States) Kathy Rinaldi	5	4
(United States) Mary Joe Fernández	2	4
6	(Czechoslovakia) Helena Suková	6	6
5	(Czechoslovakia) Hana Mandlíková	2	7^{7}	6
3	(West Germany) Steffi Graf	6	6^{3}	1
13	(Canada) Carling Bassett	7	2	1
2	(United States) Chris Evert-Lloyd	5	6	6

Semifinals
1	(United States) Martina Navratilova	4	7^{7}	6
6	(Czechoslovakia) Helena Suková	6	6^{4}	2
5	(Czechoslovakia) Hana Mandlíková	1	1
2	(United States) Chris Evert-Lloyd	6	6

Final
1	(United States) Martina Navratilova	6	3	3
2	(United States) Chris Evert-Lloyd	2	6	6

=== Earlier rounds ===
==== Section 1 ====
First round
1	(United States) Navratilova	6	6
(Italy) Cecchini	3	3
(Soviet Union) Savchenko	6	3	9
(West Germany) Pfaff	4	6	7
(West Germany) Porwik	6	6
(West Germany) Keppeler	2	4
Q	(Argentina) Tarabini	3	6	6
(West Germany) Hanika	6	3	4
(United States) Nelson-Dunbar	6	6
(United States) White	2	3
(Italy) Garrone	6	6
(Sweden) Karlsson	2	1
WC	(France) Dechaume	6	6
(United Kingdom) Gomer	2	3
10	(United States) Garrison	6	6
(West Germany) Dinu	2	3

Second round
1	(United States) Navratilova	6	6
(Soviet Union) Savchenko	2	2
(West Germany) Porwik	6	6
Q	(Argentina) Tarabini	4	2
(United States) Nelson-Dunbar	3	6^{3}
(Italy) Garrone	6	7^{7}
WC	(France) Dechaume	2	3
10	(United States) Garrison	6	6

Third round
1	(United States) Navratilova	6	6
(West Germany) Porwik	3	3
(Italy) Garrone	6	6
10	(United States) Garrison	2	2

Fourth round
1	(United States) Navratilova	6	6
(Italy) Garrone	1	2

==== Section 2 ====
First round
12	(Sweden) Lindqvist	6	6
(United States) Kim	2	1
Q	(West Germany) Meier	0	6	6
(France) Demongeot	6	3	4
(United States) Bonder	6	6
(South Africa) Reinach	4	4
(Greece) Kanellopoulou	6^{4}	6	6
(Brazil) Medrado	7^{7}	4	0
(United States) Sloane	7^{7}	2	7
Q	(Argentina) Pérez Roldán	6^{2}	6	5
(South Africa) Fairbank	6	7
WC	(France) Vanier	3	5
(United States) Burgin	6	6
LL	(Czechoslovakia) Skuherská	1	1
7	(United States) Rinaldi	6	6
(United States) Na	1	3

Second round
12	(Sweden) Lindqvist	1	6	6
Q	(West Germany) Meier	6	2	3
(United States) Bonder	6	5	6
(Greece) Kanellopoulou	2	7	2
(United States) Sloane	6	2	2
(South Africa) Fairbank	3	6	6
(United States) Burgin	6^{1}	2
7	(United States) Rinaldi	7^{7}	6

Third round
12	(Sweden) Lindqvist	4	6	6
(United States) Bonder	6	4	3
(South Africa) Fairbank	1	2
7	(United States) Rinaldi	6	6

Fourth round
12	(Sweden) Lindqvist	4
7	(United States) Rinaldi	6

==== Section 3 ====
First round
4	(West Germany) Kohde-Kilsch	6	6
(United States) McNeil	4	1
(Italy) Reggi	6	7
(Australia) Minter	1	5
(Socialist Federal Republic of Yugoslavia) Jaušovec	6	7
(Argentina) Villagrán	4	5
(Czechoslovakia) Holíková	6	6
(United States) Bowes	1	3
(United Kingdom) Hobbs	6	6
(United Kingdom) Durie	2	4
(United States) Sodupe	7	7
WC	(France) Derly	5	5
(United States) MJ Fernández	7^{7}	6
(Canada) Kelesi	6^{4}	3
14	(Hungary) Temesvári	3	6	6
(Switzerland) Jolissaint	6	2	4

Second round
4	(West Germany) Kohde-Kilsch	6	7^{7}
(Italy) Reggi	1	6^{5}
(Socialist Federal Republic of Yugoslavia) Jaušovec	1	7^{8}	7
(Czechoslovakia) Holíková	6	6^{6}	5
(United Kingdom) Hobbs	6	6
(United States) Sodupe	3	4
(United States) MJ Fernández	5	6	6
14	(Hungary) Temesvári	7	2	3

Third round
4	(West Germany) Kohde-Kilsch	6	6
(Socialist Federal Republic of Yugoslavia) Jaušovec	0	3
(United Kingdom) Hobbs	2	0
(United States) MJ Fernández	6	6

Fourth round
4	(West Germany) Kohde-Kilsch	6^{4}	5
(United States) MJ Fernández	7^{7}	7

==== Section 4 ====
First round
16	(United States) Phelps	6	6
(United States) Nagelsen	3	2
(United States) Mascarin	7^{7}	6
(United States) Holton	6^{3}	4
(United States) C Fernandez	6	5	6
(United States) Mochizuki	1	7	2
(Bulgaria) Maleeva	6	6
(United States) Holladay	1	2
(Denmark) Scheuer-Larsen	6	6
(United States) Kinney	0	0
(Switzerland) Drescher	6	6
Q	(Czechoslovakia) Novotná	2	3
(United States) G Fernández	6	6
(West Germany) Schropp	0	2
6	(Czechoslovakia) Suková	6	6
Q	(Italy) Simmonds	1	2

Second round
16	(United States) Phelps	0	6	6
(United States) Mascarin	6	2	2
(United States) C Fernandez	3	2
(Bulgaria) Maleeva	6	6
(Denmark) Scheuer-Larsen	7	6
(Switzerland) Drescher	5	2
(United States) G Fernández	5	1
6	(Czechoslovakia) Suková	7	6

Third round
16	(United States) Phelps	6^{3}	0
(Bulgaria) Maleeva	7^{7}	6
(Denmark) Scheuer-Larsen	4	4
6	(Czechoslovakia) Suková	6	6

Fourth round
(Bulgaria) Maleeva	6	4	1
6	(Czechoslovakia) Suková	3	6	6

==== Section 5 ====
First round
5	(Czechoslovakia) Mandlíková	6^{5}	6	6
(Socialist Federal Republic of Yugoslavia) Goleš	7^{7}	3	3
WC	(France) Paquet	3	6	6
(Sweden) Lindström	6	4	4
(Brazil) Dias	3	6	6
(Soviet Union) Parkhomenko	6	4	3
(Czechoslovakia) Maršíková	6	6
(United States) Horvath	4	1
(United States) Torres	6	6
(United States) Russell	3	3
(Switzerland) Krapl	2	6	6
(West Germany) Cueto	6	1	3
(Japan) Yanagi	3	7^{7}	8
(Japan) Kijimuta	6	6^{4}	6
(Peru) Gildemeister	6	6
15	(United States) White	1	3

Second round
5	(Czechoslovakia) Mandlíková	6	6
WC	(France) Paquet	0	1
(Brazil) Dias	6	2	1
(Czechoslovakia) Maršíková	2	6	6
(United States) Torres	4	6	6
(Switzerland) Krapl	6	1	1
(Japan) Yanagi	5	7^{7}	4
(Peru) Gildemeister	7	6^{3}	6

Third round
5	(Czechoslovakia) Mandlíková	6	6
(Czechoslovakia) Maršíková	1	2
(United States) Torres	1	3
(Peru) Gildemeister	6	6

Fourth round
5	(Czechoslovakia) Mandlíková	6	6
(Peru) Gildemeister	1	3

==== Section 6 ====
First round
(United States) Benjamin	1	6	6
11	(United States) Jordan	6	2	3
(United States) Gurney	7	7^{7}
(Australia) Tremelling	5	6^{4}
(United Kingdom) Croft	6	6
Q	(Sweden) Dahlström	3	3
(United States) Casale	6	3	6
(United States) Reynolds	0	6	3
(Netherlands) Mesker	6	6
(New Zealand) Cordwell	0	0
(West Germany) Bunge	6	6
(France) Calleja	1	2
(United States) Rush	5	6	8
WC	(France) Amiach	7	4	6
3	(West Germany) Graf	6	6
(West Germany) Betzner	1	0

Second round
(United States) Benjamin	6	4	8
(United States) Gurney	4	6	6
(United Kingdom) Croft	3	6	3
(United States) Casale	6	3	6
(Netherlands) Mesker	6	2	6
(West Germany) Bunge	2	6	3
(United States) Rush	1	1
3	(West Germany) Graf	6	6

Third round
(United States) Benjamin	3	6	5
(United States) Casale	6	4	7
(Netherlands) Mesker	2	1
3	(West Germany) Graf	6	6

Fourth round
(United States) Casale	1	3
3	(West Germany) Graf	6	6

==== Section 7 ====
First round
8	(Bulgaria) Maleeva	6	6
(Czechoslovakia) Skronská	1	2
(France) Suire	5	6	6
(United States) Moulton	7	4	3
Q	(Italy) Bonsignori	6	6
(Australia) Tobin	0	0
(Argentina) Paz	6^{3}	7^{7}	6
(United States) Herr	7^{7}	6^{3}	1
(Australia) Field	6	6
(Australia) Smylie	1	3
(Australia) Byrne	6	6
(South Africa) Vermaak	3	3
WC	(France) Etchemendy	6	6
(United States) Gerken	3	0
13	(Canada) Bassett	7	6
(France) Tanvier	5	3

Second round
8	(Bulgaria) Maleeva	6	6
(France) Suire	0	3
Q	(Italy) Bonsignori	5	0
(Argentina) Paz	7	6
(Australia) Field	0	4
(Australia) Byrne	6	6
WC	(France) Etchemendy	6	4	5
13	(Canada) Bassett	3	6	7

Third round
8	(Bulgaria) Maleeva	7	6^{6}	5
(Argentina) Paz	5	7^{8}	7
(Australia) Byrne	3	2
13	(Canada) Bassett	6	6

Fourth round
(Argentina) Paz	4	6	0
13	(Canada) Bassett	6	2	6

==== Section 8 ====
First round
9	(Argentina) Sabatini	6	6
(Japan) Inoue	1	1
(Austria) Huber	6	6
(France) Paradis	1	2
Q	(Argentina) Madruga-Osses	6	7
(United States) Henricksson	3	5
(Czechoslovakia) Budařová	6	6
(United States) Gompert	1	0
(France) Tauziat	5	6	9
WC	(France) Niox-Château	7	3	7
(United States) Smith	6	6
(United States) Mundel	1	3
(France) Herreman	7	6
(United States) Spence	5	1
WC	(France) Calmette	0	1
2	(United States) Evert-Lloyd	6	6

Second round
9	(Argentina) Sabatini	6	6
(Austria) Huber	1	3
Q	(Argentina) Madruga-Osses	6	2	7
(Czechoslovakia) Budařová	4	6	5
(France) Tauziat	6	2	2
(United States) Smith	1	6	6
(France) Herreman	2	1
2	(United States) Evert-Lloyd	6	6

Third round
9	(Argentina) Sabatini	6	6
Q	(Argentina) Madruga-Osses	3	3
(United States) Smith	3	1
2	(United States) Evert-Lloyd	6	6

Fourth round
9	(Argentina) Sabatini	6	3	3
2	(United States) Evert-Lloyd	1	6	6

== See also ==
- Evert–Navratilova rivalry

Preceded by 1985 Australian Open – Women's singles	Grand Slam women's singles	Succeeded by 1986 Wimbledon Championships – Women's singles
