= 1986 Wimbledon Championships – Women's doubles =

Women's doubles
- 1986 Wimbledon Championships

Final
- Champions: (United States) Martina Navratilova (United States) Pam Shriver
- Runners-up: (Czechoslovakia) Hana Mandlíková (Australia) Wendy Turnbull
- Score: 6–1, 6–3

Details
- Draw: 64 (4 Q / 4 WC / 3 LL )
- Seeds: 16

Events
Singles	men	women		boys	girls
Doubles	men	women	mixed	boys	girls
WC Singles	men	women	quad
WC Doubles	men	women	quad
Legends	men	women	seniors
← 1985 ·	Wimbledon Championships	· 1987 →

Kathy Jordan and Elizabeth Smylie were the defending champions, but decided not to play together. Jordan competed with Alycia Moulton but lost in the third round to Hana Mandlíková and Wendy Turnbull, while Smylie played with Catherine Tanvier but lost in the quarterfinals to Martina Navratilova and Pam Shriver.

Navratilova and Shriver defeated Mandlíková and Turnbull in the final, 6–1, 6–3 to win the ladies' doubles tennis title at the 1986 Wimbledon Championships.

== Seeds ==
1. (United States) Martina Navratilova / (United States) Pam Shriver (champions)
2. (West Germany) Claudia Kohde-Kilsch / (Czechoslovakia) Helena Suková (second round)
3. (Czechoslovakia) Hana Mandlíková / (Australia) Wendy Turnbull (final)
4. (United States) Chris Evert Lloyd / (United States) Anne White (second round)
5. (Australia) Elizabeth Smylie / (France) Catherine Tanvier (quarterfinals)
6. n/a
7. (Puerto Rico) Gigi Fernández / (United States) Robin White (third round)
8. (United States) Elise Burgin / (South Africa) Rosalyn Fairbank (semifinals)
9. n/a
10. (United States) Kathy Jordan / (United States) Alycia Moulton (third round)
11. (Soviet Union) Svetlana Parkhomenko / (Soviet Union) Larisa Savchenko (first round)
12. n/a
13. (United Kingdom) Jo Durie / (United Kingdom) Anne Hobbs (first round)
14. (United States) Lori McNeil / (France) Catherine Suire (first round)
15. (United States) Zina Garrison / (United States) Kathy Rinaldi (third round)
16. (United States) Candy Reynolds / (United States) Anne Smith (third round)

Click on the seed number of a player to go to their draw section.

== Draw ==
=== Key ===
- Q = Qualifier
- WC = Wild card
- LL = Lucky loser
- Alt = Alternate
- SE = Special exempt
- PR = Protected ranking
- ITF = ITF entry
- JE = Junior exempt
- w/o = Walkover
- r = Retired
- d = Defaulted
- SR = Special ranking

=== Finals ===
Quarterfinals
1	(United States) Martina Navratilova (United States) Pam Shriver	7	6
5	(Australia) Elizabeth Smylie (France) Catherine Tanvier	5	4
(United States) Gretchen Rush (United States) JoAnne Russell	6	3	2
8	(United States) Elise Burgin (South Africa) Rosalyn Fairbank	2	6	6
(South Africa) Jennifer Mundel (United States) Molly Van Nostrand	6	1	2
3	(Czechoslovakia) Hana Mandlíková (Australia) Wendy Turnbull	2	6	6
(Australia) Jenny Byrne (Australia) Janine Thompson	3	6	3
(United States) Patty Fendick (Canada) Jill Hetherington	6	4	6

Semifinals
1	(United States) Martina Navratilova (United States) Pam Shriver	6	6
8	(United States) Elise Burgin (South Africa) Rosalyn Fairbank	4	3
3	(Czechoslovakia) Hana Mandlíková (Australia) Wendy Turnbull	6	6	6
(United States) Patty Fendick (Canada) Jill Hetherington	3	7	3

Final
1	(United States) Martina Navratilova (United States) Pam Shriver	6	6
3	(Czechoslovakia) Hana Mandlíková (Australia) Wendy Turnbull	1	3

=== Top half ===
==== Section 1 ====
First round
1	(United States) M Navratilova (United States) P Shriver	6	6
(United States) S Mascarin (United States) T Phelps	3	2
(Brazil) N Dias (Brazil) P Medrado	6	6
Q	(Australia) K Deed (Australia) N Provis	4	1
WC	(United Kingdom) A Brown (United Kingdom) J Tacon	5	6	6
(France) S Amiach (United States) H Ludloff	7	3	8
(South Africa) E Reinach (South Africa) M Reinach	6	4	13
13	(United Kingdom) J Durie (United Kingdom) A Hobbs	4	6	11
LL	(United States) J Golder (United States) S Pendo	4	2
(United States) S Collins (South Africa) Y Vermaak	6	6
(United States) T Mochizuki (Japan) M Yanagi	6	4
WC	(United Kingdom) L Gracie (United Kingdom) J Salmon	7	6
(Czechoslovakia) I Budařová (Czechoslovakia) M Skuherská	4	2
(West Germany) A Betzner (United States) M Gurney	6	6
(Argentina) M Paz (United States) S Rehe	3	0
5	(Australia) E Smylie (France) C Tanvier	6	6

Second round
1	(United States) M Navratilova (United States) P Shriver	6	6
(Brazil) N Dias (Brazil) P Medrado	3	1
(France) S Amiach (United States) H Ludloff	6	7	3
(South Africa) E Reinach (South Africa) M Reinach	7	5	6
(United States) S Collins (South Africa) Y Vermaak	7	6
WC	(United Kingdom) L Gracie (United Kingdom) J Salmon	5	1
(West Germany) A Betzner (United States) M Gurney	3	1
5	(Australia) E Smylie (France) C Tanvier	6	6

Third round
1	(United States) M Navratilova (United States) P Shriver	w/o
(South Africa) E Reinach (South Africa) M Reinach
(United States) S Collins (South Africa) Y Vermaak	4	4
5	(Australia) E Smylie (France) C Tanvier	6	6

Quarterfinals
1	(United States) M Navratilova (United States) P Shriver	7	6
5	(Australia) E Smylie (France) C Tanvier	5	4

==== Section 2 ====
First round
4	(United States) C Evert Lloyd (United States) A White	6	6
(United States) L Antonoplis (Brazil) C Monteiro	3	3
(United States) H Crowe (United States) K Steinmetz	5	2
(United States) G Rush (United States) J Russell	7	6
Q	(Brazil) G Miró (Argentina) P Tarabini	7	4	4
(New Zealand) B Cordwell (Argentina) A Villagrán	6	6	6
(France) I Demongeot (France) N Tauziat	6	4
15	(United States) Z Garrison (United States) K Rinaldi	7	6
(Bulgaria) K Maleeva (Bulgaria) M Maleeva	6	4	6
(United States) C Benjamin (United States) K Sands	2	6	1
(West Germany) B Bunge (West Germany) C Porwik	6	6
(United States) P Casale (United States) M Torres	2	2
(United States) L Allen (United States) R Reis	0	6	4
(Sweden) C Karlsson (Denmark) T Scheuer-Larsen	6	3	6
WC	(United Kingdom) B Borneo (United Kingdom) V Lake	3	4
8	(United States) E Burgin (South Africa) R Fairbank	6	6

Second round
4	(United States) C Evert Lloyd (United States) A White	3	6	4
(United States) G Rush (United States) J Russell	6	3	6
(New Zealand) B Cordwell (Argentina) A Villagrán	6	7	3
15	(United States) Z Garrison (United States) K Rinaldi	7	5	6
(Bulgaria) K Maleeva (Bulgaria) M Maleeva	6	6	3
(West Germany) B Bunge (West Germany) C Porwik	4	7	6
(Sweden) C Karlsson (Denmark) T Scheuer-Larsen	4	3
8	(United States) E Burgin (South Africa) R Fairbank	6	6

Third round
(United States) G Rush (United States) J Russell	6	4	10
15	(United States) Z Garrison (United States) K Rinaldi	4	6	8
(West Germany) B Bunge (West Germany) C Porwik	4	4
8	(United States) E Burgin (South Africa) R Fairbank	6	6

Quarterfinals
(United States) G Rush (United States) J Russell	6	3	2
8	(United States) E Burgin (South Africa) R Fairbank	2	6	6

=== Bottom half ===
==== Section 3 ====
First round
LL	(Australia) M Jaggard (United States) J Kaplan	7	6
(United States) K McDaniel (United States) W White	6	2
(Peru) L Gildemeister (United States) M Louie Harper	3	6
(South Africa) J Mundel (United States) M Van Nostrand	6	7
(United States) C Copeland (United States) D Farrell	4	4
(Sweden) M Lindström (United States) P Smith	6	6
(United States) A Henricksson (Switzerland) C Jolissaint	3	6	1
16	(United States) C Reynolds (United States) A Smith	6	3	6
10	(United States) K Jordan (United States) A Moulton	6	6
(Australia) A Minter (Australia) E Minter	3	1
(Italy) A-M Cecchini (Italy) R Reggi	3	4
(Czechoslovakia) K Böhmová (Czechoslovakia) A Holíková	6	6
Q	(United States) B Gerken (South Africa) D van Rensburg	6	5	6
WC	(United Kingdom) J Louis (United Kingdom) J Wood	2	7	2
(United States) L Bonder (United States) M-L Piatek	4	4
3	(Czechoslovakia) H Mandlíková (Australia) W Turnbull	6	6

Second round
LL	(Australia) M Jaggard (United States) J Kaplan	2	6	3
(South Africa) J Mundel (United States) M Van Nostrand	6	3	6
(Sweden) M Lindström (United States) P Smith	7	4	4
16	(United States) C Reynolds (United States) A Smith	6	6	6
10	(United States) K Jordan (United States) A Moulton	6	6
(Czechoslovakia) K Böhmová (Czechoslovakia) A Holíková	0	2
Q	(United States) B Gerken (South Africa) D van Rensburg	5	6
3	(Czechoslovakia) H Mandlíková (Australia) W Turnbull	7	7

Third round
(South Africa) J Mundel (United States) M Van Nostrand	6	1	8
16	(United States) C Reynolds (United States) A Smith	4	6	6
10	(United States) K Jordan (United States) A Moulton	6	6	7
3	(Czechoslovakia) H Mandlíková (Australia) W Turnbull	7	3	9

Quarterfinals
(South Africa) J Mundel (United States) M Van Nostrand	6	1	2
3	(Czechoslovakia) H Mandlíková (Australia) W Turnbull	2	6	6

==== Section 4 ====
First round
7	(Puerto Rico) G Fernández (United States) R White	6	6
(United States) J Goodling (United States) V Nelson-Dunbar	0	3
(United States) P Barg (United States) E Herr	6	7
(Socialist Federal Republic of Yugoslavia) M Jaušovec (Poland) I Kuczyńska	3	6
(Australia) D Balestrat (West Germany) E Pfaff	3	4
(Sweden) C Lindqvist (United Kingdom) V Wade	6	6
(Australia) J Byrne (Australia) J Thompson	3	7	6
11	(Soviet Union) S Parkhomenko (Soviet Union) L Savchenko	6	6	4
14	(United States) L McNeil (France) C Suire	4	3
(United States) A-M Fernandez (New Zealand) J Richardson	6	6
(United States) K Horvath (Czechoslovakia) R Maršíková	4	2
Q	(United States) L Spain-Short (Australia) A Tobin-Dingwall	6	6
(United States) P Fendick (Canada) J Hetherington	6	7
LL	(United States) Ca MacGregor (United States) Cy MacGregor	3	5
(United Kingdom) A Croft (United Kingdom) S Gomer	4	4
2	(West Germany) C Kohde-Kilsch (Czechoslovakia) H Suková	6	6

Second round
7	(Puerto Rico) G Fernández (United States) R White	6	5	6
(United States) P Barg (United States) B Herr	2	7	3
(Sweden) C Lindqvist (United Kingdom) V Wade	6	2
(Australia) J Byrne (Australia) J Thompson	7	6
(United States) A-M Fernandez (New Zealand) J Richardson	6	6	6
Q	(United States) L Spain-Short (Australia) A Tobin-Dingwall	3	7	2
(United States) P Fendick (Canada) J Hetherington	7	6
2	(West Germany) C Kohde-Kilsch (Czechoslovakia) H Suková	5	4

Third round
7	(Puerto Rico) G Fernández (United States) R White	6	2
(Australia) J Byrne (Australia) J Thompson	7	6
(United States) A-M Fernandez (New Zealand) J Richardson	2	6
(United States) P Fendick (Canada) J Hetherington	6	7

Quarterfinals
(Australia) J Byrne (Australia) J Thompson	3	6	3
(United States) P Fendick (Canada) J Hetherington	6	4	6
