= Annabel Croft =

British tennis player (born 1966)

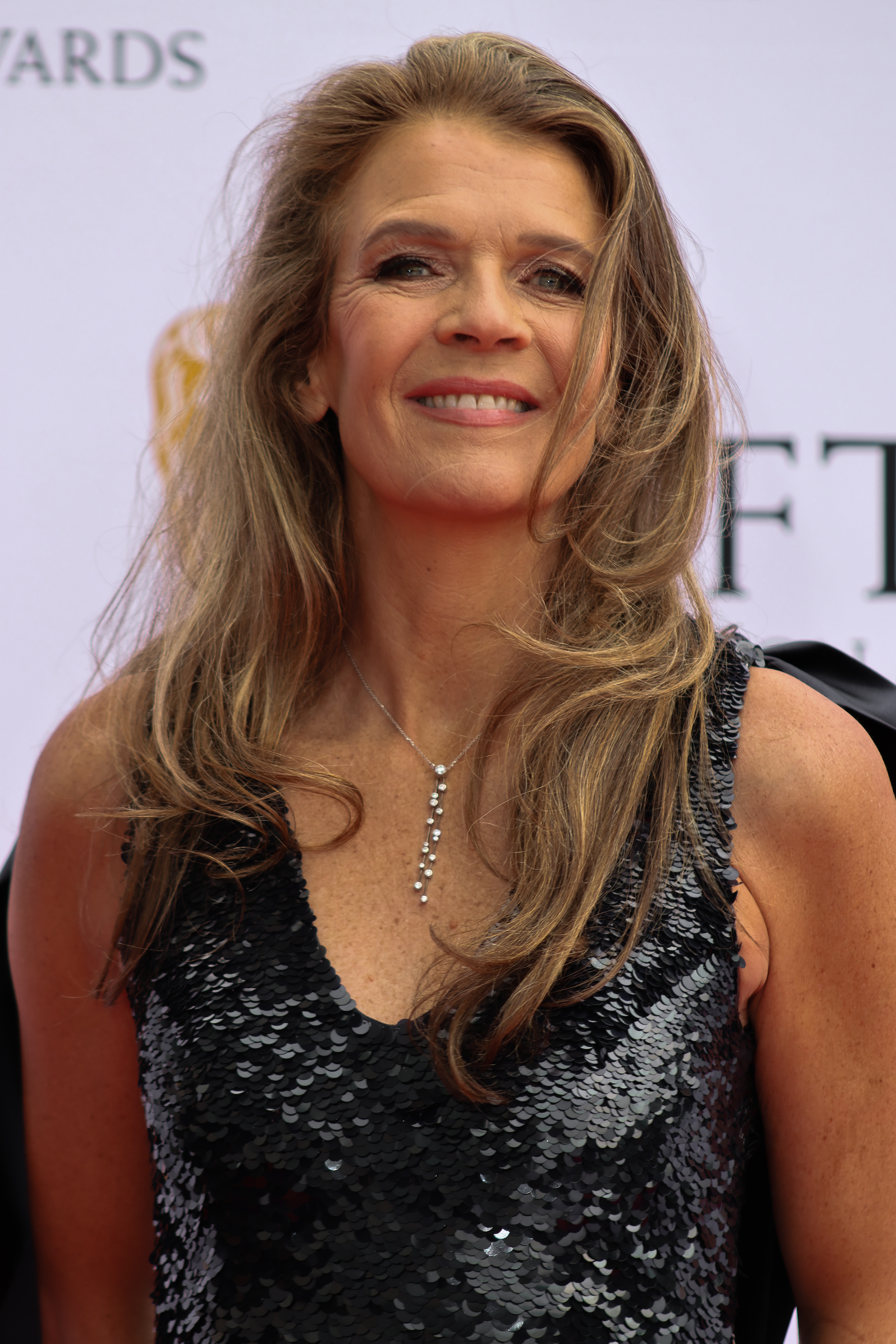
- Croft in 2026
- Full name: Annabel Nicola Croft
- Country (sports): (United Kingdom) Great Britain
- Born: 12 July 1966 (age 60) Farnborough, Kent, England
- Retired: 1988
- Prize money: $201,254

Singles
- Career record: 49–68
- Career titles: 1
- Highest ranking: No. 24 (31 December 1985)

Grand Slam singles results
- Australian Open: 2R (1984, 1985)
- French Open: 2R (1986)
- Wimbledon: 3R (1984)
- US Open: 3R (1986)

Doubles
- Career record: 13–36
- Career titles: 0
- Highest ranking: No. 126 (21 December 1986)

Annabel Nicola Croft (born 12 July 1966) is a British former professional tennis player and current radio and television presenter. As a tennis player she won the WTA Tour event Virginia Slims of San Diego and represented Great Britain in the Fed Cup and the Wightman Cup.

After retiring from tennis, she turned to television presenting, with such shows as Treasure Hunt and Interceptor. In 2005, she appeared in the ITV programme Celebrity Wrestling and went on to win it. In 2023 Croft was a contestant in BBC's Strictly Come Dancing and finished fourth.

Most recently she has been a presenter and pundit for Eurosport, Sky Sports and the BBC.

== Early life ==
Croft was born in Farnborough, Kent. Her father James was educated at the independent Sutton Valence School in Kent, becoming a chartered surveyor. He married her mother, Susan Templer of Higham, Kent, in June 1963. Her father worked for Richard Ellis, which is now CBRE Group. They lived in Bickley. She was coached by Derek Bone.

== Tennis career ==
After winning the Wimbledon and Australian Open girls' tournaments in 1984, she won the Virginia Slims of San Diego tournament in 1985, beating Wendy Turnbull in the final in straight sets. In December 1985, she achieved a world ranking of 24. She played for Great Britain in the Fed Cup in 1985 and 1986, and in the Wightman Cup from 1983 to 1986. She continued to play through February 1988, but failed to reach another final.

== After tennis ==
Despite her potential and being amongst the world's top 25 players, Croft retired from professional tennis at the age of twenty-one, tired of the relentless travel and feeling she no longer enjoyed playing. Immediately after her retirement, Croft became the new face of Channel 4's prime time show Treasure Hunt, following Anneka Rice's successful run. This was followed by her own show on ITV, Interceptor.

In 1990 Croft released her own fitness video entitled Annabel Croft's Shape Tape.

She has been involved in coverage of Wimbledon Tennis Championship for the BBC, BBC Radio 5 Live and GMTV, and has also worked for Sky Sports, and Eurosport as a tennis pundit. She has appeared on UK lifestyle TV shows such as The Wright Stuff, The Entertainment Show, GMTV, Out and About and This Morning.

In June 2009, Croft was one of five volunteers who took part in a BBC series of two programmes Famous, Rich and Homeless about living penniless on the streets of London. After Famous, Rich and Homeless Croft did a follow-on BBC Radio 5 Live radio show which was broadcast on 24 and 25 December 2009, entitled James: My Alcoholic Friend, where she tries to track down the rough sleeper with whom she had spent a night on the streets.

She was a presenter for Sky Sports, including the 2012 US Open. She also jointly presented Game, Set & Mats on Eurosport in 2015, along with former tennis player Mats Wilander, during Grand Slam tournament weeks of tennis.

In November 2011, Croft – a presenter on Eurosport – hosted the AIB Media Excellence Awards, the international competition for journalism and factual production.

In October 2012, Croft launched a company called DiaryDoll with TV presenter Carol Smillie, retailing waterproof pants for periods, post-maternity and pelvic-floor weakness, with an aim to be pretty, feminine, breathable and wash-proof whilst reducing stigma of the topic of women's pelvic health.

In 2021 she was the winner of the IC of GB Sportsmanship Award, given to a British tennis player for admirable attitude as a sportsman or sportswoman during their career. Former winners include Sue Barker (2019), Virginia Wade (2017), Greg Rusedski (2011), Tim Henman (1999), and Jeremy Bates (1995).

Between September and December 2023, Croft was a contestant in the twenty-first series of the BBC's Strictly Come Dancing, partnered with professional dancer Johannes Radebe. The couple finished in fourth place.

== Personal life ==
Croft was married to Mel Coleman, a former international America's Cup and Admiral's Cup yachtsman. They were married on 10 July 1993 at Brasted St Martins, by the Rev Raymond Hill. She met her husband when he taught her to sail in 1987 for a TV programme. The guests included Roger Taylor and jockey John Francome. They were driven away from the church in the original car from Chitty Chitty Bang Bang, which was her favourite film.

The couple lived in Coombe, near Wimbledon, in the London borough of Kingston, with their three children, two daughters named Amber Rose and Lily and a son, Charlie. In 2009, jointly, they started the Annabel Croft Tennis Academy at the National Tennis Centre. After a short illness with stomach cancer, Coleman died on 24 May 2023.

Croft has been active in raising awareness of child obesity, and is a supporter of the children's cancer charity Young Lives vs Cancer (formerly known as CLIC Sargent).

== WTA career finals 1 (1 title) ==
Result	No.	Date	Tournament	Surface	Opponent	Score
Win	1.	22 April 1985	Virginia Slims of San Diego, United States	Hard	(Australia) Wendy Turnbull	6–0, 7–6^{(7–5)}

== Grand Slam performance timelines ==
Key
W	F	SF	QF	#R	RR	Q#	DNQ	A	NH

(W) winner; (F) finalist; (SF) semifinalist; (QF) quarterfinalist; (#R) rounds 4, 3, 2, 1; (RR) round-robin stage; (Q#) qualification round; (DNQ) did not qualify; (A) absent; (NH) not held; (SR) strike rate (events won / competed); (W–L) win–loss record.

=== Singles ===
Tournament	1982	1983	1984	1985	1986	1987	1988	W–L	SR
Australian Open	Q1	Q2	1R	1R	NH	A	1R	0–3	0 / 3
French Open	A	Q1	1R	1R	2R	1R	A	1–4	0 / 4
Wimbledon	1R	1R	3R	1R	1R	2R	A	3–6	0 / 6
US Open	Q2	1R	1R	2R	3R	2R	A	4–5	0 / 5
Win–loss	0–1	0–2	2–4	1–4	3–3	2–3	0–1	8–18	0 / 18
Year-end ranking	161	138	82	24	82	141	265		

=== Doubles ===
Tournament	1984	1985	1986	1987	W–L	SR
Australian Open	1R	2R	NH	A	0–3	0 / 3
French Open	2R	1R	1R	1R	1–4	0 / 4
Wimbledon	A	1R	1R	1R	3–6	0 / 6
US Open	1R	1R	1R	A	4–5	0 / 5
Win–loss	0–1	0–2	2–4	1–4	8–18	0 / 18
Year-end ranking	114	62	126	292		

=== Mixed doubles ===
Tournament	1983	1984	1985	1986	1987	W–L	SR
Australian Open	A			NH	A	0–0	0 / 0
French Open	A	1R	A	1R	A	1–4	0 / 4
Wimbledon	1R	1R	1R	1R	2R	3–6	0 / 6
US Open	1R	1R	A			4–5	0 / 5
Win–loss	0–1	0–1	0–2	2–4	1–4	8–18	0 / 18

== National team participation ==
=== Fed Cup ===
1985 Federation Cup Main Draw
Date	Venue	Surface	Round	Opponents	Final match score	Match	Opponent	Rubber score
6–14 Oct 1985	Nagoya	Hard	R1	West Germany	3–0	Singles	Myriam Schropp	6–3, 6–1 (W)
6–14 Oct 1985	Nagoya	Hard	R2	Japan	2–1	Singles	Etsuko Inoue	7–6^{(9–7)}, 6–7^{(4–7)}, 6–3 (W)
6–14 Oct 1985	Nagoya	Hard	QF	Bulgaria	1–2	Singles	Manuela Maleeva	2–6, 2–6 (L)
1986 Federation Cup Consolation rounds
20–27 Jul 1986	Prague	Clay	R1	BYE				
20–27 Jul 1986	Prague	Clay	R2	Finland	3–0	Singles	Petra Thorén	6–4, 3–6, 6–4 (W)
20–27 Jul 1986	Prague	Clay	R2	Finland	3–0	Doubles(with Anne Hobbs)	Suonpaa/Thorén	6–0, 6–1 (W)
20–27 Jul 1986	Prague	Clay	QF	Indonesia	3–0	Singles	Suzanna Anggarkusuma	6–2, 2–6, 6–2 (W)
20–27 Jul 1986	Prague	Clay	QF	Indonesia	3–0	Doubles(with Anne Hobbs)	Anggarkusuma/Basuki	6–2, 4–6, 6–2 (W)
20–27 Jul 1986	Prague	Clay	SF	Hungary	3–0	Singles	Csilla Cserepy	6–4, 6–2 (W)
20–27 Jul 1986	Prague	Clay	SF	Hungary	3–0	Doubles(with Anne Hobbs)	Cserepy/Szikszay	2–1, ret. (W)
20–27 Jul 1986	Prague	Clay	W	Soviet Union	2–1	Singles	Larisa Savchenko	6–4, 6–0 (W)
20–27 Jul 1986	Prague	Clay	W	Soviet Union	2–1	Doubles(with Anne Hobbs)	Egorova/Parkhomenko	2–6, 1–6 (L)
