= Stephanie Faulkner =

Australian tennis player

- Country (sports): Australia
- Born: 11 May 1969 (age 55)
- Plays: Right-handed
- Prize money: $15,078

Singles
- Highest ranking: No. 215 (6 Jul 1987)

Grand Slam singles results
- Australian Open: 1R (1988)
- French Open: Q1 (1986)
- Wimbledon: Q2 (1986)

Doubles
- Highest ranking: No. 337 (23 Nov 1987)

Grand Slam doubles results
- Wimbledon: Q3 (1986)

Stephanie Faulkner (born 11 May 1969) is an Australian former professional tennis player.

Faulkner, a Queenslander, won national championships in junior age groups and played on the professional tour during the late 1980s. At the 1985 Auckland Open she had an upset win over the top seeded Belinda Cordwell to reach the quarter-finals. She made the main draw of the 1988 Australian Open and lost in the first round to Zina Garrison.

== ITF finals ==
=== Singles: 3 (0–3) ===
Result	No.	Date	Tournament	Surface	Opponent	Score
Loss	1.	Jun 1985	ITF Birmingham, United States	Clay	(United States) Susan Sloane	4–6, 2–6
Loss	2.	Oct 1985	ITF Honolulu, United States	Hard	(United States) Kate Latham	6–7^{(2)}, 6–1, 3–6
Loss	3.	Jul 1987	ITF Litchfield, United States	Clay	(Japan) Maya Kidowaki	3–6, 1–6
