= Helena Dahlström =

Swedish tennis player

- Country (sports): Sweden
- Born: 13 May 1968 (age 56)
- Prize money: $40,443

Singles
- Highest ranking: No. 166 (21 December 1986)

Grand Slam singles results
- French Open: 1R (1986)

Doubles
- Highest ranking: No. 221 (2 January 1989)

Grand Slam doubles results
- Australian Open: 2R (1988)
- Wimbledon: Q2 (1986)

Helena Dahlström (born 13 May 1968) is a Swedish former professional tennis player.

== Biography ==
A right-handed player from Linköping, Dahlström was the girls' singles runner-up at the 1984 Australian Open.

Dahlström competed on the professional tour in the late 1980s and reached a top singles ranking of 166. She won the Australian Hard Court Championships in 1985 and featured in the main draw of the 1986 French Open as a qualifier.

She appeared in two Federation Cup ties for Sweden in 1986, playing both singles and doubles in a World Group fixture against France, then in the consolations rounds against Belgium.

== ITF finals ==
=== Singles (3–4) ===
Legend
$25,000 tournaments
$10,000 / $15,000 tournaments

Result	No.	Date	Tournament	Surface	Opponent	Score
Win	1.	25 February 1985	São Paulo, Brazil	Clay	(Argentina) Mercedes Paz	5–7, 6–4, 6–4
Loss	2.	23 September 1985	Bethesda, United States	Hard	(United States) Jane Forman	3–6, 5–7
Win	3.	28 October 1985	Newcastle, Australia	Grass	(Australia) Karen Deed	6–4, 6–1
Win	4.	4 November 1985	Sydney, Australia	Grass	(Sweden) Monica Lundqvist	6–4, 3–6, 7–6
Loss	5.	23 March 1987	Melbourne, Australia	Hard	(Australia) Louise Field	3–6, 3–6
Loss	6.	17 October 1988	Azores, Portugal	Hard	(Hungary) Andrea Noszály	1–6, 3–6
Loss	7.	30 January 1989	Danderyd, Sweden	Hard	(Finland) Nanne Dahlman	6–4, 1–6, 4–6

=== Doubles (1–1) ===
Result	No.	Date	Tournament	Surface	Partner	Opponents	Score
Loss	1.	5 September 1988	Porto, Portugal	Clay	(Sweden) Cecilia Dahlman	(Switzerland) Sandrine Jaquet (West Germany) Martina Pawlik	3–6, 1–6
Win	2.	17 October 1988	Azores, Portugal	Hard	(Finland) Anne Aallonen	(United Kingdom) Caroline Billingham (United Kingdom) Alexandra Niepel	6–3, 6–3

== See also ==
- List of Sweden Fed Cup team representatives
