= 1986 Wimbledon Championships – Mixed doubles =

Mixed doubles
- 1986 Wimbledon Championships

Final
- Champions: (United States) Ken Flach (United States) Kathy Jordan
- Runners-up: (Switzerland) Heinz Günthardt (United States) Martina Navratilova
- Score: 6–3, 7–6^{(9–7)}

Details
- Draw: 64 (2 Q / 7 WC )
- Seeds: 16

Events
Singles	men	women		boys	girls
Doubles	men	women	mixed	boys	girls
WC Singles	men	women	quad
WC Doubles	men	women	quad
Legends	men	women	seniors
← 1985 ·	Wimbledon Championships	· 1987 →

Paul McNamee and Martina Navratilova were the defending champions, but decided not to play together. McNamee competed with Hana Mandlíková but lost in the first round to David Graham and Elise Burgin, while Navratilova played with Heinz Günthardt.

Ken Flach and Kathy Jordan defeated Günthardt and Navratilova in the final by 6–3, 7–6^{(9–7)} to win the mixed doubles tennis title at the 1986 Wimbledon Championships.

== Seeds ==
1. (United States) Ken Flach / (United States) Kathy Jordan (champions)
2. (Australia) John Fitzgerald / (Australia) Elizabeth Smylie (quarterfinals)
3. (Switzerland) Heinz Günthardt / (United States) Martina Navratilova (final)
4. (Australia) Paul McNamee / (Czechoslovakia) Hana Mandlíková (first round)
5. (United States) Scott Davis / (United States) Betsy Nagelsen (withdrew)
6. (South Africa) Christo van Rensburg / (South Africa) Rosalyn Fairbank (third round)
7. (Czechoslovakia) Pavel Složil / (West Germany) Claudia Kohde-Kilsch (second round)
8. (United Kingdom) John Lloyd / (Australia) Wendy Turnbull (quarterfinals)
9. (Spain) Emilio Sánchez / (West Germany) Bettina Bunge (semifinals)
10. (Australia) Mark Edmondson / (United Kingdom) Anne Hobbs (third round)
11. (Spain) Sergio Casal / (Italy) Raffaella Reggi (third round)
12. (United States) Gary Donnelly / (United States) Paula Smith (second round)
13. (Australia) Kim Warwick / (Australia) Jenny Byrne (first round)
14. (United States) Steve Denton / (West Germany) Eva Pfaff (third round)
15. (Switzerland) Jakob Hlasek / (Switzerland) Christiane Jolissaint (second round)
16. (United Kingdom) Jeremy Bates / (United Kingdom) Jo Durie / (quarterfinals)

Click on the seed number of a player to go to their draw section.

== Draw ==
=== Key ===
- Q = Qualifier
- WC = Wild card
- LL = Lucky loser
- Alt = Alternate
- SE = Special exempt
- PR = Protected ranking
- ITF = ITF entry
- JE = Junior exempt
- w/o = Walkover
- r = Retired
- d = Defaulted
- SR = Special ranking

=== Finals ===
Quarterfinals
1	(United States) Ken Flach (United States) Kathy Jordan	6	6
8	(United Kingdom) John Lloyd (Australia) Wendy Turnbull	3	4
(South Africa) Michael Robertson (South Africa) Elna Reinach	4	7^{7}	6
WC	(Australia) John Newcombe (Australia) Janine Thompson	6	6^{5}	4
16	(United Kingdom) Jeremy Bates (United Kingdom) Jo Durie	4	3
3	(Switzerland) Heinz Günthardt (United States) Martina Navratilova	6	6
9	(Spain) Emilio Sánchez (West Germany) Bettina Bunge	5	7	6
2	(Australia) John Fitzgerald (Australia) Elizabeth Smylie	7	5	4

Semifinals
1	(United States) Ken Flach (United States) Kathy Jordan	7	6
(South Africa) Michael Robertson (South Africa) Elna Reinach	5	4
3	(Switzerland) Heinz Günthardt (United States) Martina Navratilova	7^{7}	6
9	(Spain) Emilio Sánchez (West Germany) Bettina Bunge	6^{0}	3

Final
1	(United States) Ken Flach (United States) Kathy Jordan	6	7^{9}
3	(Switzerland) Heinz Günthardt (United States) Martina Navratilova	3	6^{7}

=== Top half ===
==== Section 1 ====
First round
1	(United States) K Flach (United States) K Jordan	7	6
(United Kingdom) J Smith (United Kingdom) J Salmon	6	3
(Australia) L Warder (Australia) A Minter	7	6
Q	(Colombia) Á Jordan (Australia) A Tobin-Dingwall	6	4
(New Zealand) K Evernden (New Zealand) B Cordwell	5	6
(Australia) P Doohan (Australia) D Balestrat	7	7
(United States) C Wittus (New Zealand) J Richardson	4	6	1
14	(United States) S Denton (West Germany) E Pfaff	6	3	6
10	(Australia) M Edmondson (United Kingdom) A Hobbs	6	6
(United Kingdom) S Shaw (United States) J Kaplan	4	2
(Nigeria) N Odizor (United States) C Benjamin	6	6
WC	(South Africa) F McMillan (Netherlands) B Stöve	0	2
(Argentina) G Tiberti (Argentina) P Tarabini	3	2
(Australia) B Drewett (Canada) H Kelesi	6	6
WC	(United Kingdom) R Lewis (United Kingdom) S Gomer	4	2
8	(United Kingdom) J Lloyd (Australia) W Turnbull	6	6

Second round
1	(United States) K Flach (United States) K Jordan	7	6
(Australia) L Warder (Australia) A Minter	5	4
(Australia) P Doohan (Australia) D Balestrat
14	(United States) S Denton (West Germany) E Pfaff	w/o
10	(Australia) M Edmondson (United Kingdom) A Hobbs	w/o
(Nigeria) N Odizor (United States) C Benjamin
(Australia) B Drewett (Canada) H Kelesi	3	4
8	(United Kingdom) J Lloyd (Australia) W Turnbull	6	6

Third round
1	(United States) K Flach (United States) K Jordan	6^{1}	6	6
14	(United States) S Denton (West Germany) E Pfaff	7^{7}	1	4
10	(Australia) M Edmondson (United Kingdom) A Hobbs	5	4
8	(United Kingdom) J Lloyd (Australia) W Turnbull	7	6

Quarterfinals
1	(United States) K Flach (United States) K Jordan	6	6
8	(United Kingdom) J Lloyd (Australia) W Turnbull	3	4

==== Section 2 ====
First round
4	(Australia) P McNamee (Czechoslovakia) H Mandlíková	6	6	4
(Australia) D Graham (United States) E Burgin	3	7	6
LL	(Argentina) G Luza (Brazil) G Miró	6	2
(United States) B Testerman (United States) K McDaniel	7	6
(South Africa) M Robertson (South Africa) E Reinach	6	6
(United States) Ti Gullikson (United States) S Mascarin	3	4
(United States) G Layendecker (United States) P Fendick	6	2	3
15	(Switzerland) J Hlasek (Switzerland) C Jolissaint	4	6	6
12	(United States) G Donnelly (United States) P Smith	6	2	6
(South Africa) B Levine (United States) H Ludloff	2	6	3
(United States) M Freeman (United States) Z Garrison	6	4	5
WC	(Australia) J Newcombe (Australia) J Thompson	4	6	7
LL	(United States) G Niebur (United States) H Crowe	2	2
LL	(Australia) D Macpherson (Australia) L O'Neill	6	6
(United Kingdom) D Felgate (France) C Suire	4	3
LL	(Japan) H Shirato (Japan) M Yanagi	6	6

Second round
(Australia) D Graham (United States) E Burgin	w/o
(United States) B Testerman (United States) K McDaniel
(South Africa) M Robertson (South Africa) E Reinach	7	5	6
15	(Switzerland) J Hlasek (Switzerland) C Jolissaint	5	7	3
12	(United States) G Donnelly (United States) P Smith	4	6	3
WC	(Australia) J Newcombe (Australia) J Thompson	6	3	6
LL	(Australia) D Macpherson (Australia) L O'Neill	4	6	9
LL	(Japan) H Shirato (Japan) M Yanagi	6	4	11

Third round
(Australia) D Graham (United States) E Burgin	4	6	7
(South Africa) M Robertson (South Africa) E Reinach	6	2	9
WC	(Australia) J Newcombe (Australia) J Thompson	6	2	6
LL	(Japan) H Shirato (Japan) M Yanagi	4	6	4

Quarterfinals
(South Africa) M Robertson (South Africa) E Reinach	4	7^{7}	6
WC	(Australia) J Newcombe (Australia) J Thompson	6	6^{5}	4

=== Bottom half ===
==== Section 3 ====
First round
7	(Czechoslovakia) P Složil (West Germany) C Kohde-Kilsch	6	6	6
(Chile) R Acuña (Canada) J Hetherington	7	2	4
(Mexico) J Lozano (United States) E Herr	6	6
(United Kingdom) C Dowdeswell (Switzerland) E Krapl	4	4
(United Kingdom) N Fulwood (United Kingdom) L Gracie	2	6
WC	(South Africa) R Hewitt (United States) M Werdel	6	7
(United States) M Davis (United States) R White	6	4	4
16	(United Kingdom) J Bates (United Kingdom) J Durie	4	6	6
13	(Australia) K Warwick (Australia) J Byrne	6	3	5
(United States) C Strode (Soviet Union) L Savchenko	4	6	7
(United States) K Richter (United States) C Copeland	1	4
(United States) C Dunk (United States) M-L Piatek	6	6
(United States) B Schultz (Puerto Rico) G Fernández
(Denmark) M Mortensen (Denmark) T Scheuer-Larsen	w/o
(United States) L Shiras (United States) K Horvath	5	5
3	(Switzerland) H Günthardt (United States) M Navratilova	7	7

Second round
7	(Czechoslovakia) P Složil (West Germany) C Kohde-Kilsch	6	3	4
(Mexico) J Lozano (United States) E Herr	4	6	6
WC	(South Africa) R Hewitt (United States) M Werdel	3	2
16	(United Kingdom) J Bates (United Kingdom) J Durie	6	6
(United States) C Strode (Soviet Union) L Savchenko	6	7
(United States) C Dunk (United States) M-L Piatek	1	5
(Denmark) M Mortensen (Denmark) T Scheuer-Larsen	5	1
3	(Switzerland) H Günthardt (United States) M Navratilova	7	6

Third round
(Mexico) J Lozano (United States) E Herr	6^{4}	3
16	(United Kingdom) J Bates (United Kingdom) J Durie	7^{7}	6
(United States) C Strode (Soviet Union) L Savchenko	3	3
3	(Switzerland) H Günthardt (United States) M Navratilova	6	6

Quarterfinals
16	(United Kingdom) J Bates (United Kingdom) J Durie	4	3
3	(Switzerland) H Günthardt (United States) M Navratilova	6	6

==== Section 4 ====
First round
6	(South Africa) C van Rensburg (South Africa) R Fairbank	4	6	8
(United States) To Gullikson (Bulgaria) M Maleeva	6	1	6
WC	(Australia) O Davidson (United Kingdom) A Croft	6	5	4
(Australia) C Fancutt (United States) C Reynolds	3	7	6
WC	(United Kingdom) J Feaver (United Kingdom) V Wade	6	6	6
WC	(United States) D Ralston (Canada) C Bassett	1	7	4
(India) A Amritraj (United States) M Van Nostrand	3	5
9	(Spain) E Sánchez (West Germany) B Bunge	6	7
11	(Spain) S Casal (Italy) R Reggi	w/o
(United States) L Bourne (United States) A Moulton
(Australia) D Cahill (United States) J Goodling	w/o
(Australia) M Fancutt (United States) B Potter
(United States) C Cox (United States) W White	3	3
Q	(Sweden) M Tideman (Australia) L Field	6	6
(United States) T Witsken (United States) A-M Fernandez	5	6
2	(Australia) J Fitzgerald (Australia) E Smylie	7	7

Second round
6	(South Africa) C van Rensburg (South Africa) R Fairbank	7	6
(Australia) C Fancutt (United States) C Reynolds	6	4
WC	(United Kingdom) J Feaver (United Kingdom) V Wade	3	2
9	(Spain) E Sánchez (West Germany) B Bunge	6	6
11	(Spain) S Casal (Italy) R Reggi	6	3	8
(Australia) D Cahill (United States) J Goodling	4	6	6
Q	(Sweden) M Tideman (Australia) L Field	4	6
2	(Australia) J Fitzgerald (Australia) E Smylie	6	7

Third round
6	(South Africa) C van Rensburg (South Africa) R Fairbank	5	3
9	(Spain) E Sánchez (West Germany) B Bunge	7	6
11	(Spain) S Casal (Italy) R Reggi	2	4
2	(Australia) J Fitzgerald (Australia) E Smylie	6	6

Quarterfinals
9	(Spain) E Sánchez (West Germany) B Bunge	5	7	6
2	(Australia) J Fitzgerald (Australia) E Smylie	7	5	4
