= Diane Farrell (tennis) =

American tennis player

- Full name: Diane Farrell Wainio
- Country (sports): United States
- Born: November 5, 1961 (age 63)
- Prize money: $24,285

Singles
- Career record: 19–25
- Highest ranking: No. 220 (March 2, 1987)

Grand Slam singles results
- French Open: Q1 (1986)
- Wimbledon: 1R (1986)
- US Open: Q1 (1986)

Doubles
- Career record: 26–34
- Highest ranking: No. 122 (December 21, 1986)

Grand Slam doubles results
- French Open: 2R (1985)
- Wimbledon: 1R (1985, 1986)
- US Open: 2R (1986)

Diane Farrell Wainio (born November 5, 1961) is an American former professional tennis player. She was raised in Binghamton, New York and played collegiate tennis for the University of San Diego.

Farrell, who reached a career best singles ranking of 220, qualified for the main draw at Wimbledon in 1986. All three of her wins in qualifying went beyond 6–6 in the third set, against Cláudia Monteiro, Sabina Simmonds and Elisabeth Ekblom. She lost her first round match to Elizabeth Minter, in three sets.

As a doubles player she was ranked as high as 122 in the world and in addition to Wimbledon also featured in the main draws of the French Open and US Open. She won two ITF doubles titles, including a $25,000 tournament in Hopewell.

She married her husband Fredrick Wainio, an accountant, in 1991.

== ITF finals ==
Legend
$25,000 tournaments
$10,000 tournaments

=== Doubles: 3 (2–1) ===
Result	No.	Date	Tournament	Surface	Partner	Opponents	Score
Win	1.	November 4, 1984	Sydney, Australia	Grass	(Australia) Annette Gulley	(New Zealand) Belinda Cordwell (New Zealand) Julie Richardson	6–3, 6–3
Loss	1.	January 18, 1985	Delray Beach, United States	Hard	(United States) Jaime Kaplan	(Sweden) Elizabeth Ekblom (Netherlands) Marianne van der Torre	3–6, 5–7
Win	2.	September 15, 1985	Hopewell, United States	Clay	(United States) Jenni Goodling	(Australia) Louise Field (Japan) Akemi Nishiya-Kinoshita	2–6, 7–5, 6–4
