= Denise Parnell =

British tennis player

- Country (sports): United Kingdom
- Born: 11 October 1960 (age 64)
- Prize money: $14,165

Singles
- Highest ranking: No. 308 (7 Jan 1985)

Grand Slam singles results
- Wimbledon: 1R (1986)

Doubles
- Highest ranking: No. 339 (21 Dec 1986)

Grand Slam doubles results
- Wimbledon: Q3 (1983)

Denise Parnell (born 11 October 1960) is a British former professional tennis player.

A native of Manchester, Parnell attended Withington Girls' School and was active on the professional tour throughout the 1980s, reaching a best singles world ranking of 308. In 1986 she competed in the singles main draw of the Wimbledon Championships, where she was beaten in the first round by seventh seed Helena Suková.

Parnell is now a tennis referee, officiating in Wimbledon since 2006.
