= 1986 Wimbledon Championships – Girls' singles =

Girls' singles
- 1986 Wimbledon Championships

Final
- Champion: (Soviet Union) Natasha Zvereva
- Runner-up: (Soviet Union) Leila Meskhi
- Score: 2–6, 6–2, 9–7

Events
| Singles | men | women | | boys | girls |
| Doubles | men | women | mixed | boys | girls |
| WC Singles | men | women | quad |
| WC Doubles | men | women | quad |
| Legends | men | women | seniors |
- Wimbledon Championships

Natasha Zvereva defeated Leila Meskhi in the final, 2–6, 6–2, 9–7 to win the girls' singles tennis title at the 1986 Wimbledon Championships.

== Seeds ==
1. (West Germany) Claudia Porwik (first round)
2. (Argentina) Patricia Tarabini (second round)
3. (Australia) Nicole Provis (second round)
4. (West Germany) Wiltrud Probst (quarterfinals)
5. (Australia) Michelle Jaggard (semifinals)
6. (South Africa) Dinky van Rensburg (third round)
7. (Netherlands) Hellas ter Riet (third round)
8. (Czechoslovakia) Jana Novotná (third round)
9. (France) Emmanuelle Derly (second round)
10. (France) Cécile Calmette (second round)
11. (Argentina) Bettina Fulco (third round)
12. (Brazil) Gisele Miró (semifinals)
13. (Brazil) Gisele Faria (second round)
14. (Belgium) Ann Devries (quarterfinals)
15. (United States) Rona Daniels (first round)
16. (Argentina) Gabriela Mosca (second round)

Click on the seed number of a player to go to their draw section.

== Draw ==
Key

- Q = Qualifier
- WC = Wild card
- LL = Lucky loser
- Alt = Alternate
- ITF = ITF entry
- PR = Protected ranking
- SR = Special ranking
- SE = Special exempt
- JE = Junior exempt
- JR = Junior Accelerator Programme entrant
- CO = College Accelerator Programme entrant
- NG = Next Gen Accelerator Program entrant
- w/o = Walkover
- r = Retired
- d = Defaulted

=== Finals ===
Quarterfinals
(Czechoslovakia) Radka Zrubáková | 0 | 6 | 0
12 | (Brazil) Gisele Miró | 6 | 3 | 6
14 | (Belgium) Ann Devries | 3 | 6 | 2
(Soviet Union) Leila Meskhi | 6 | 2 | 6
(Soviet Union) Natasha Zvereva | 6 | 6
4 | (West Germany) Wiltrud Probst | 4 | 2
5 | (Australia) Michelle Jaggard | 6 | 6
(Chile) Paulina Sepúlveda | 1 | 0

Semifinals
12 | (Brazil) Gisele Miró | 2 | 2
(Soviet Union) Leila Meskhi | 6 | 6
(Soviet Union) Natasha Zvereva | 4 | 6 | 6
5 | (Australia) Michelle Jaggard | 6 | 3 | 1

Final
(Soviet Union) Leila Meskhi | 6 | 2 | 7
(Soviet Union) Natasha Zvereva | 2 | 6 | 9

=== Top half ===
==== Section 1 ====
First round
1 | (West Germany) Claudia Porwik | 3 | 4
(Czechoslovakia) Radka Zrubáková | 6 | 6
(Brazil) Cláudia Chabalgoity | 6 | 6
(Republic of Ireland) Lisa Pamintuan | 4 | 2
(Finland) Sarianna Ansio | 3 | 1
(Jamaica) Hentietta Harris | 6 | 6
(United States) Shannan McCarthy | 1 | 1
11 | (Argentina) Bettina Fulco | 6 | 6
12 | (Brazil) Gisele Miró | 6 | 4 | 6
(Australia) Karen Deed | 1 | 6 | 4
(Philippines) Jennifer Saberon | 1 | 4
(Hong Kong) Paulette Moreno | 6 | 6
(United Kingdom) Jane Wood | 6 | 6
(Chile) Pauline Rodríguez | 3 | 2
(Brazil) Luciana Tella | 3 | 1
6 | (South Africa) Dinky van Rensburg | 6 | 6

Second round
1 | (Czechoslovakia) R Zrubáková | 2 | 6 | 6
(Brazil) C Chabalgoity | 6 | 2 | 4
(Jamaica) H Harris | 2 | 0
11 | (Argentina) B Fulco | 6 | 6
12 | (Brazil) G Miró | 6 | 0 | 6
(Hong Kong) P Moreno | 3 | 6 | 1
(United Kingdom) J Wood | 0 | 2
6 | (South Africa) D van Rensburg | 6 | 6

Third round
1 | (Czechoslovakia) R Zrubáková | 6 | 6
11 | (Argentina) B Fulco | 2 | 3
12 | (Brazil) G Miró | 6 | 6
6 | (South Africa) D van Rensburg | 4 | 2

Quarterfinals
(Czechoslovakia) R Zrubáková | 0 | 6 | 0
12 | (Brazil) G Miró | 6 | 3 | 6

==== Section 2 ====
First round
3 | (Australia) Nicole Provis | 6 | 6 | 6
(Italy) Laura Lapi | 3 | 7 | 4
(Bulgaria) Elena Pampoulova | 1 | 2
(United Kingdom) Sally Timms | 6 | 6
(France) Sybille Niox-Château | 6 | 7
(Chile) Natalie Rodríguez | 2 | 6
(United Kingdom) Anne Simpkin | 3 | 3
14 | (Belgium) Ann Devries | 6 | 6
16 | (Argentina) Gabriela Mosca | 6 | 6
(Brazil) Renata Della | 4 | 2
(South Africa) Linda Barnard | 2 | 6 | 0
(Soviet Union) Leila Meskhi | 6 | 4 | 6
(South Africa) Paulette Roux | 6 | 6
(South Africa) Gail Boon | 3 | 4
(Japan) Ayako Hirose | 3 | 4
7 | (Netherlands) Hellas ter Riet | 6 | 6

Second round
3 | (Australia) N Provis | 6 | 2
(United Kingdom) S Timms | 7 | 6
(France) S Niox-Château | 2 | 3
14 | (Belgium) A Devries | 6 | 6
16 | (Argentina) G Mosca | 3 | 4
(Soviet Union) L Meskhi | 6 | 6
(South Africa) P Roux | 1 | 3
7 | (Netherlands) H ter Riet | 6 | 6

Third round
(United Kingdom) S Timms | 4 | 3
14 | (Belgium) A Devries | 6 | 6
(Soviet Union) L Meskhi | 2 | 6 | 7
7 | (Netherlands) H ter Riet | 6 | 4 | 5

Quarterfinals
14 | (Belgium) A Devries | 3 | 6 | 2
(Soviet Union) L Meskhi | 6 | 2 | 6

=== Bottom half ===
==== Section 3 ====
First round
8 | (Czechoslovakia) Jana Novotná | 6 | 6
(France) Alexia Dechaume | 1 | 4
(South Korea) Kim Il-soon | 6 | 6
(Japan) Yoriko Yamagishi | 2 | 3
(Soviet Union) Natasha Zvereva | 6 | 6
(United Kingdom) Valda Lake | 3 | 4
(Philippines) Nina Castillejo | 3 | 3
10 | (France) Cécile Calmette | 6 | 6
15 | (United States) Rona Daniels | 6 | 1 | 3
(Australia) Lisa O'Neill | 4 | 6 | 6
(United Kingdom) Sally Godman | 6 | 6
(Poland) Katarzyna Nowak | 0 | 1
(Socialist Federal Republic of Yugoslavia) Aila Winkler | 6 | 6
(Malta) Carol Curmi | 4 | 4
(United Kingdom) Teresa Catlin | 3 | 1
4 | (West Germany) Wiltrud Probst | 6 | 6

Second round
8 | (Czechoslovakia) J Novotná | 6 | 6
(South Korea) I-s Kim | 4 | 3
(Soviet Union) N Zvereva | 6 | 6
10 | (France) C Calmette | 3 | 1
(Australia) Lisa O'Neill | 6 | 6
(United Kingdom) S Godman | 1 | 3
(Socialist Federal Republic of Yugoslavia) A Winkler | 1 | 3
4 | (West Germany) W Probst | 6 | 6

Third round
(Czechoslovakia) J Novotná | 6 | 4 | 1
(Soviet Union) N Zvereva | 4 | 6 | 6
(Australia) L O'Neill | 4 | 6 | 5
4 | (West Germany) W Probst | 6 | 2 | 7

Quarterfinals
(Soviet Union) N Zvereva | 6 | 6
4 | (West Germany) W Probst | 4 | 2

==== Section 4 ====
First round
5 | (Australia) Michelle Jaggard | 6 | 6
(United Kingdom) Katie Rickett | 1 | 1
(India) Shaheen Zaman | 4 | 2
(Switzerland) Sandrine Jaquet | 6 | 6
(Japan) Ryoko Yamaguchi | 4 | 6
(Italy) Simone D'Andrea | 6 | 7
(Finland) Petra Thorén | 1 | 1
9 | (France) Emmanuelle Derly | 6 | 6
13 | (Brazil) Gisele Faria | 6 | 6
(France) Frédérique Martin | 4 | 4
(Chile) Paulina Sepúlveda | 6 | 6
(Thailand) Sakorwan Karcharoen | 2 | 3
(United Kingdom) Clare Wood | 6 | 7
(Poland) Sylwia Czopek | 1 | 5
(Hungary) Ildikó Guba | 1 | 2
2 | (Argentina) Patricia Tarabini | 6 | 6

Second round
5 | (Australia) M Jaggard | 6 | 6
(Switzerland) S Jaquet | 3 | 3
(Italy) S D'Andrea | 6 | 6
9 | (France) E Derly | 4 | 1
13 | (Brazil) G Faria | 6 | 6 | 5
(Chile) P Sepúlveda | 7 | 3 | 7
(United Kingdom) C Wood | 5 | 6 | 6
2 | (Argentina) P Tarabini | 7 | 4 | 2

Third round
5 | (Australia) M Jaggard | 6 | 6
(Italy) S D'Andrea | 0 | 4
(Chile) P Sepúlveda | 6 | 3 | 6
(United Kingdom) C Wood | 1 | 6 | 2

Quarterfinals
5 | (Australia) M Jaggard | 6 | 6
(Chile) P Sepúlveda | 1 | 0
