= Jane Forman =

American tennis player

- Country (sports): United States
- Born: January 21, 1962 (age 63); Providence, Rhode Island
- Prize money: $52,146

Singles
- Highest ranking: No. 161 (July 20, 1987)

Grand Slam singles results
- French Open: Q1 (1984, 1985)
- Wimbledon: 2R (1986)
- US Open: 1R (1983)

Doubles

Grand Slam doubles results
- Wimbledon: Q3 (1986)

Jane Forman (born January 21, 1962) is an American former professional tennis player.

She was born in Providence, in Rhode Island. Forman played college tennis with Clemson University in the early 1980s. She was a three-time singles All-American for Clemson, and she was named ACC Player of the Year twice.

Forman qualified for her first grand slam main draw at the 1983 US Open. Her best performance was a second round appearance at the 1986 Wimbledon Championships. She beat Eva Pfaff in the first round. She lost to the top seed and eventual champion, Martina Navratilova, in the second round.

She has been running the Jane Forman Tennis Academy in Miami-Dade., since 1990.
