= Caryn Wilson =

American tennis player and golfer (born 1961)

- Full name: Caryn Copeland-Wilson
- Country (sports): United States
- Born: March 14, 1961 (age 64)
- Plays: Right-handed
- Prize money: $32,304

Singles
- Highest ranking: No. 163 (March 30, 1987)

Grand Slam singles results
- Australian Open: 1R (1987)
- Wimbledon: Q3 (1984)
- US Open: Q3 (1979, 1985)

Doubles
- Highest ranking: No. 162 (December 21, 1986)

Grand Slam doubles results
- Wimbledon: 1R (1986)
- US Open: 2R (1979, 1984)

Grand Slam mixed doubles results
- Wimbledon: 1R (1986)

Caryn Copeland-Wilson (born March 14, 1961) is an American amateur golfer and former professional tennis player. In 1999 she became the second person in history, after Althea Gibson, to have competed in the U.S. Open in both tennis and golf.

Before picking up golf in her late 20s, Wilson played college tennis for Stanford University (as Caryn Copeland) and served as captain of the Cardinals' 1982 NCAA Division I championship winning side. From 1983 to 1987 she competed on the professional tour, during which time she made several appearances in grand slam tournaments. In addition to the US Open, she also featured in the singles main draw of the 1987 Australian Open and played doubles at Wimbledon.
