= Pam Casale =

American tennis player

- Full name: Pamela Casale-Telford
- Country (sports): United States
- Born: December 20, 1963 (age 61); Camden, New Jersey, U.S.
- Turned pro: 1980
- Retired: 1991
- Plays: Right-handed
- Prize money: $379,828

Singles
- Career record: 186–165
- Career titles: 0 WTA, 1 ITF
- Highest ranking: No. 14 (October 15, 1984)

Grand Slam singles results
- Australian Open: 1R (1988)
- French Open: 4R (1982, 1986)
- Wimbledon: 3R (1982, 1984)
- US Open: 3R (1981)

Doubles
- Career record: 35–96
- Career titles: 0
- Highest ranking: No. 45 (August 17, 1987)

Grand Slam doubles results
- Australian Open: 1R (1988)
- French Open: 2R (1982, 1984, 1985)
- Wimbledon: 1R (1983, 1984, 1985, 1986, 1987)
- US Open: 2R (1986)

Pamela Casale-Telford (née Casale; born December 20, 1963) is a former professional tennis player from the United States.

The right-hander reached her highest career ranking on October 15, 1984, when she became number fourteen in the world. Her best Grand Slam result was the fourth round at the 1986 French Open at Roland Garros.
