= 1986 Wimbledon Championships – Men's singles =

Men's singles
- 1986 Wimbledon Championships

Final
- Champion: (West Germany) Boris Becker
- Runner-up: (Czechoslovakia) Ivan Lendl
- Score: 6–4, 6–3, 7–5

Details
- Draw: 128 (16Q / 8WC)
- Seeds: 16

Events
Singles	men	women		boys	girls
Doubles	men	women	mixed	boys	girls
WC Singles	men	women	quad
WC Doubles	men	women	quad
Legends	men	women	seniors
- Wimbledon Championships

Defending champion Boris Becker defeated Ivan Lendl in the final, 6–4, 6–3, 7–5 to win the gentlemen's singles tennis title at the 1986 Wimbledon Championships. It was Becker's second major title.

At just 18 years, 226 days old, Becker became the youngest man to win multiple grand slam titles, as well as the youngest to defend a grand slam title.

== Seeds ==
1. (Czechoslovakia) Ivan Lendl (final)
2. (Sweden) Mats Wilander (fourth round)
3. (United States) Jimmy Connors (first round)
4. (West Germany) Boris Becker (champion)
5. (Sweden) Stefan Edberg (third round)
6. (Sweden) Joakim Nyström (third round)
7. (France) Henri Leconte (semifinals)
8. (Sweden) Anders Järryd (second round)
9. (Ecuador) Andrés Gómez (first round)
10. (United States) Tim Mayotte (quarterfinals)
11. (United States) Kevin Curren (first round)
12. (United States) Brad Gilbert (fourth round)
13. (Sweden) Mikael Pernfors (fourth round)
14. (Argentina) Martín Jaite (second round)
15. (Argentina) Guillermo Vilas (first round)
16. (United States) Johan Kriek (second round)

Click on the seed number of a player to go to their draw section.

== Draw ==
Key

- Q = Qualifier
- WC = Wild card
- LL = Lucky loser
- Alt = Alternate
- ITF = ITF entry
- PR = Protected ranking
- SR = Special ranking
- SE = Special exempt
- JE = Junior exempt
- JR = Junior Accelerator Programme entrant
- CO = College Accelerator Programme entrant
- NG = Next Gen Accelerator Program entrant
- w/o = Walkover
- r = Retired
- d = Defaulted

=== Finals ===
Quarterfinals
1	(Czechoslovakia) Ivan Lendl	6	4	6	3	9
10	(United States) Tim Mayotte	4	6	4	6	7
(Socialist Federal Republic of Yugoslavia) Slobodan Živojinović	6	7^{7}	4	6
(India) Ramesh Krishnan	2	6^{4}	6	3
(Czechoslovakia) Miloslav Mečíř	4	2	6^{5}
4	(West Germany) Boris Becker	6	6	7^{7}
7	(France) Henri Leconte	4	7^{9}	7^{7}	6
WC	(Australia) Pat Cash	6	6^{7}	6^{5}	3

Semifinals
1	(Czechoslovakia) Ivan Lendl	6	6^{5}	6	6^{1}	6
(Socialist Federal Republic of Yugoslavia) Slobodan Živojinović	2	7^{7}	3	7^{7}	4
4	(West Germany) Boris Becker	6	6	6^{4}	6
7	(France) Henri Leconte	2	4	7^{7}	3

Final
1	(Czechoslovakia) Ivan Lendl	4	3	5
4	(West Germany) Boris Becker	6	6	7

=== Top half ===
==== Section 1 ====
First round
1	(Czechoslovakia) I Lendl	7	6	6
(Mexico) L Lavalle	6	3	4
(United States) M Freeman	6	6	7
(Brazil) N Aerts	4	4	6
(Canada) G Michibata	6	2	3	4
(Israel) A Mansdorf	3	6	6	6
(United States) R Green	2	2	6
(Sweden) P Lundgren	6	6	7
WC	(United Kingdom) N Fulwood	7	6	6	7
Q	(United States) B Pearce	6	7	2	6
(United States) M Anger	6	7	7
(Spain) S Casal	3	6	5
(Spain) D de Miguel	5	1	4
(United States) J Sadri	7	6	6
Q	(Australia) B Custer	6	2	3
16	(United States) J Kriek	7	6	6

Second round
1	(Czechoslovakia) I Lendl	6	6	6
(United States) M Freeman	3	2	2
(Israel) A Mansdorf	7	6	6
(Sweden) P Lundgren	6	2	2
WC	(United Kingdom) N Fulwood	2	4	2
(United States) M Anger	6	6	6
(United States) J Sadri	2	6	7	6
16	(United States) J Kriek	6	3	6	3

Third round
1	(Czechoslovakia) I Lendl	6	6	6
(Israel) A Mansdorf	2	4	4
(United States) M Anger	6	7	7	6
(United States) J Sadri	7	6	6	4

Fourth round
1	(Czechoslovakia) I Lendl	6^{7}	7^{7}	6	7^{12}
(United States) M Anger	7^{9}	6^{2}	4	6^{10}

==== Section 2 ====
First round
10	(United States) T Mayotte	6	6	6
Q	(Soviet Union) A Zverev	4	4	4
(United States) H Solomon	3	2	2
(United States) J Canter	6	6	6
(Sweden) J Gunnarsson	6	6	6
(Chile) H Gildemeister	3	4	4
(Czechoslovakia) T Šmid	6	6	7
(Australia) D Cahill	4	3	5
(Australia) P Doohan	1	2	3
(Switzerland) J Hlasek	6	6	6
WC	(United Kingdom) M Walker	6	6	6	2	1
(Switzerland) C Mezzadri	7	4	1	6	6
(South Africa) E Edwards	7	7	3	6
(Czechoslovakia) K Nováček	5	6	6	2
LL	(United States) W Scanlon	4	6	3	7	4
8	(Sweden) A Järryd	6	3	6	5	6

Second round
10	(United States) T Mayotte	7	6	7
(United States) J Canter	5	4	6
(Sweden) J Gunnarsson	7	4	3	4
(Czechoslovakia) T Šmid	6	6	6	6
(Switzerland) J Hlasek	3	6	7	6
(Switzerland) C Mezzadri	6	4	5	1
(South Africa) E Edwards	3	6	7	6
8	(Sweden) A Järryd	6	4	6	2

Third round
10	(United States) T Mayotte	6	6	2	6
(Czechoslovakia) T Šmid	4	2	6	2
(Switzerland) J Hlasek	6	6	2	3	1
(South Africa) E Edwards	3	4	6	6	6

Fourth round
10	(United States) T Mayotte	6	6	7^{7}
(South Africa) E Edwards	3	4	6^{3}

==== Section 3 ====
First round
3	(United States) J Connors	3	6	6	6
(United States) R Seguso	6	3	7	7
(West Germany) D Keretić	6	4	3	5
(United States) B Teacher	2	6	6	7
Q	(United States) C Hooper	3	5	4
Q	(South Africa) C van Rensburg	6	7	6
(United States) T Wilkison	7	6	6	6
WC	(United Kingdom) S Shaw	5	7	4	4
(France) T Champion	3	6	7	5	3
(Canada) M Wostenholme	6	1	6	7	6
(Australia) S Youl	4	7	6	6	4
(Socialist Federal Republic of Yugoslavia) S Živojinović	6	6	4	7	6
Q	(United States) K Flach	5	7	6	6
(Sweden) J Windahl	7	6	3	0
(France) G Forget	6	3	6	6	2
14	(Argentina) M Jaite	7	6	3	3	6

Second round
(United States) R Seguso	6	3	6	6
(United States) B Teacher	2	6	3	4
Q	(South Africa) C van Rensburg	6	6	6
(United States) T Wilkison	4	2	1
(Canada) M Wostenholme	6	2	4
(Socialist Federal Republic of Yugoslavia) S Živojinović	7	6	6
Q	(United States) K Flach	6	6	6
14	(Argentina) M Jaite	4	3	3

Third round
(United States) R Seguso	7	4	0	2
Q	(South Africa) C van Rensburg	5	6	6	6
(Socialist Federal Republic of Yugoslavia) S Živojinović	4	6	7	6
Q	(United States) K Flach	6	4	5	3

Fourth round
Q	(South Africa) C van Rensburg	6^{4}	5	6	5
(Socialist Federal Republic of Yugoslavia) S Živojinović	7^{7}	7	4	7

==== Section 4 ====
First round
11	(United States) K Curren	4	7	6	4	10
(West Germany) E Jelen	6	6	2	6	12
(United States) M Davis	6	6	7
Q	(United States) M Flur	2	2	6
(United Kingdom) J Bates	6	1	4	5
(United States) T Witsken	3	6	6	7
(United States) T Nelson	6	4	6	6
(United States) D Pate	7	6	4	7
Q	(West Germany) C Saceanu	6	4	6	3
Q	(United States) M Bauer	7	6	3	6
(India) R Krishnan	7	6	6
(Mexico) F Maciel	5	3	3
(Poland) W Fibak	6	3	6	6
(India) V Amritraj	1	6	4	3
(New Zealand) K Evernden	5	3	6	6	3
6	(Sweden) J Nyström	7	6	3	4	6

Second round
(West Germany) E Jelen	6	6	6
(United States) M Davis	2	3	4
(United States) T Witsken	3	1	5
(United States) D Pate	6	6	7
Q	(United States) M Bauer	6	2	3	7	5
(India) R Krishnan	4	6	6	5	7
(Poland) W Fibak	6	0	1	2
6	(Sweden) J Nyström	4	6	6	6

Third round
(West Germany) E Jelen	7	6	6
(United States) D Pate	6	3	4
(India) R Krishnan	6	6	7	6
6	(Sweden) J Nyström	7	2	6	4

Fourth round
(West Germany) E Jelen	4	6^{1}	2
(India) R Krishnan	6	7^{7}	6

=== Bottom half ===
==== Section 5 ====
First round
5	(Sweden) S Edberg	6	6	6
(United States) V Wilder	4	3	1
(United States) P Annacone	6	7	6
WC	(United Kingdom) S Bale	3	5	3
(Czechoslovakia) P Složil	4	6	6	4	5
(Sweden) U Stenlund	6	1	1	6	7
(Netherlands) M Schapers	2	0^{r}
(Czechoslovakia) M Mečíř	6	1
(United States) E Teltscher	6	4	4
(Czechoslovakia) M Šrejber	7	6	6
(Switzerland) H Günthardt	7	6	3	6
(United States) G Layendecker	5	2	6	1
(United States) M Leach	6	7	7
(West Germany) R Osterthun	3	6	6
(Australia) M Woodforde	3	4	4
12	(United States) B Gilbert	6	6	6

Second round
5	(Sweden) S Edberg	6	6	4	7	6
(United States) P Annacone	4	7	6	5	0
(Sweden) U Stenlund	2	1	6	0
(Czechoslovakia) M Mečíř	6	6	4	6
(Czechoslovakia) M Šrejber	6	4	4	7	6
(Switzerland) H Günthardt	3	6	6	6	3
(United States) M Leach	6	6	2
12	(United States) B Gilbert	7	7	6

Third round
5	(Sweden) S Edberg	4	4	4
(Czechoslovakia) M Mečíř	6	6	6
(Czechoslovakia) M Šrejber	5	7	3	3
12	(United States) B Gilbert	7	6	6	6

Fourth round
(Czechoslovakia) M Mečíř	3	7^{7}	6	6
12	(United States) B Gilbert	6	6^{3}	1	2

==== Section 6 ====
First round
13	(Sweden) M Pernfors	2	6	6	7
(United States) M De Palmer	6	4	4	5
(West Germany) A Maurer	6	6	6
Q	(Israel) S Glickstein	4	2	4
Q	(South Africa) B Levine	1	6	3
(Sweden) J Svensson	6	7	6
(United States) S Giammalva	6	6	6
(Australia) M Edmondson	4	1	3
(South Africa) C Steyn	3	2	6	6	6
(United Kingdom) J Lloyd	6	6	3	3	1
(Australia) P McNamee	6	6	7
Q	(United States) P Chamberlin	3	4	6
(United States) C Schultz	2	6	6	1
(United States) T Gullikson	6	4	7	6
(Argentina) E Bengoechea	4	2	1
4	(West Germany) B Becker	6	6	6

Second round
13	(Sweden) M Pernfors	7	6	4	6
(West Germany) A Maurer	5	2	6	2
(Sweden) J Svensson	6	2	1	4
(United States) S Giammalva	2	6	6	6
(South Africa) C Steyn	5	1	6	3
(Australia) P McNamee	7	6	3	6
(United States) T Gullikson	4	3	2
4	(West Germany) B Becker	6	6	6

Third round
13	(Sweden) M Pernfors	2	6	6	6
(United States) S Giammalva	6	4	3	1
(Australia) P McNamee	4	4	6	4
4	(West Germany) B Becker	6	6	4	6

Fourth round
13	(Sweden) M Pernfors	3	6^{2}	2
4	(West Germany) B Becker	6	7^{7}	6

==== Section 7 ====
First round
7	(France) H Leconte	7	6	6
(Haiti) R Agénor	5	2	3
(Soviet Union) A Chesnokov	2	6	4	4
WC	(United Kingdom) C Dowdeswell	6	2	6	6
(Chile) R Acuña	3	6	4
(United States) G Holmes	6	7	6
(West Germany) M Westphal	7	6	6	7
(Romania) F Segărceanu	5	4	7	6
WC	(United Kingdom) S Botfield	6	3	6	2	6
(Spain) E Sánchez	3	6	2	6	3
(United States) B Testerman	7	6	3	3
(Australia) W Masur	6	7	6	6
(South Africa) D Visser	5	6	6	6	6
Q	(South Africa) M Robertson	7	7	3	3	4
(Australia) J Fitzgerald	6	3	7	6
9	(Ecuador) A Gómez	1	6	6	4

Second round
7	(France) H Leconte	6	6	6
WC	(United Kingdom) C Dowdeswell	1	4	4
(United States) G Holmes	3	7	7	4	6
(West Germany) M Westphal	6	6	5	6	2
WC	(United Kingdom) S Botfield	4	2	2
(Australia) W Masur	6	6	6
(South Africa) D Visser	3	6	6	6	2
(Australia) J Fitzgerald	6	3	4	7	6

Third round
7	(France) H Leconte	6	6	7
(United States) G Holmes	4	2	6
(Australia) W Masur	6	6	7	4
(Australia) J Fitzgerald	7	7	5	6

Fourth round
7	(France) H Leconte	7^{7}	6^{5}	6	6
(Australia) J Fitzgerald	6^{1}	7^{7}	2	3

==== Section 8 ====
First round
15	(Argentina) G Vilas	4	2	3
WC	(Australia) P Cash	6	6	6
(New Zealand) R Simpson	7	4	6	6
(South Africa) B Moir	6	6	4	2
(Argentina) M Ingaramo	6	3	4	7	6
(West Germany) H Schwaier	4	6	6	5	8
Q	(South Africa) K Moir	2	4	3
Q	(United States) J Lapidus	6	6	6
(Nigeria) N Odizor	6	3	6	6	6
Q	(Australia) M Kratzmann	4	6	7	4	8
(Brazil) C Kirmayr	6	6	6
(Sweden) H Sundström	4	2	4
WC	(United Kingdom) A Castle	7	7	6
(Australia) B Dyke	6	6	3
(United States) S Davis	6	4	4
2	(Sweden) M Wilander	7	6	6

Second round
WC	(Australia) P Cash	6	6	6	7
(New Zealand) R Simpson	7	3	2	5
(West Germany) H Schwaier	2	7	7	3	3
Q	(United States) J Lapidus	6	6	5	6	6
Q	(Australia) M Kratzmann	7	6	4	6
(Brazil) C Kirmayr	5	2	6	1
WC	(United Kingdom) A Castle	6	6	7	4	0
2	(Sweden) M Wilander	4	7	6	6	6

Third round
WC	(Australia) P Cash	6	6	6	7
Q	(United States) J Lapidus	1	4	7	5
Q	(Australia) M Kratzmann	4	4	6	1
2	(Sweden) M Wilander	6	6	2	6

Fourth round
WC	(Australia) P Cash	4	7	6	6
2	(Sweden) M Wilander	6	5	4	3

Preceded by 1986 French Open	Grand Slams; Men's Singles	Succeeded by 1986 US Open
