= Karen Deed =

Australian tennis player

- Country (sports): Australia
- Born: 29 October 1968 (age 56)
- Plays: Right-handed

Singles
- Highest ranking: No. 366 (30 March 1987)

Grand Slam singles results
- Australian Open: 1R (1988)
- Wimbledon: Q1 (1986)

Doubles
- Highest ranking: No. 283 (18 January 1988)

Grand Slam doubles results
- Australian Open: 1R (1988)
- Wimbledon: 1R (1986)

Karen Deed (born 29 October 1968) is an Australian former professional tennis player.

A right-handed player, Deed competed on the international tour during the 1980s, making main draw appearances at the Australian Open and Wimbledon.

Deed, while a student at the University of Wollongong, represented Australia at the 1991 World University Games, which were held in Sheffield, England.

== ITF finals ==
=== Singles: 1 (0–1) ===
Outcome	Date	Tournament	Surface	Opponent	Score
Runner-up	28 October 1985	Newcastle, Australia	Grass	(Sweden) Helena Dahlström	4–6, 1–6

=== Doubles: 2 (1–1) ===
Outcome	Date	Tournament	Surface	Partner	Opponents	Score
Winner	28 July 1985	Columbus, United States	Hard	(United States) Stephanie Savides	(United States) Alison Winston (Brazil) Themis Zambrzycki	6–2, 6–2
Runner-up	16 March 1987	Canberra, Australia	Hard	(Australia) Bilynda Potter	(Australia) Colleen Carney (Australia) Alison Scott	5–7, 6–7
