= Cécille Calmette =

French tennis player

- Country (sports): France
- Born: 2 July 1968 (age 57)
- Prize money: $13,490

Singles

Grand Slam singles results
- French Open: 3R (1985)
- Wimbledon: Q1 (1986)

Doubles

Grand Slam doubles results
- French Open: 1R (1985, 1986)
- Wimbledon: Q2 (1986)

Grand Slam mixed doubles results
- French Open: 1R (1985, 1986)

Cécille Calmette (born 2 July 1968) is a French former professional tennis player.

Calmette is most noted for her performance as a wildcard at the 1985 French Open, making the third round with wins over Mercedes Paz and Anne Minter, before her run was ended by 10th-seed Bonnie Gadusek.
