= Lisa Spain Short =

American tennis player

- Full name: Lisa Spain Short
- ITF name: Lisa Spain-Short
- Country (sports): USA
- Born: 1962 (age 62–63) Moultrie, Georgia, U.S.
- Turned pro: 1982
- Retired: 1986
- Plays: Right-handed
- Prize money: $52,653

Singles
- Career record: 17–34
- Career titles: 0
- Highest ranking: No. 155 (December 21, 1986)

Grand Slam singles results
- Australian Open: 1R (1985)
- French Open: 2R (1985)
- Wimbledon: 2R (1986)
- US Open: 2R (1985)

Doubles

Grand Slam doubles results
- Wimbledon: 2R (1986)

Lisa Spain Short (née Spain) is a retired tennis player. She was the first female tennis player to receive a full scholarship at the University of Georgia.

== Early years ==
Spain grew up in Moultrie, Georgia, where she attended Moultrie High School. She played on the school tennis team and had 56 wins with only a single loss in her high school career, winning the state singles championship four times. When she was a junior, she received a scholarship offer from Clemson to play as the number 2 singles player on its team. Her reaction was " I wanted to be the number one singles player. I thanked the coach for the offer but said no thanks." This experience was followed by an offer for a full scholarship from Georgia, which she accepted.

== College ==
In a coincidence, her first match at Georgia was against Clemson, where she played their number one single player and won. She calls it her "sweetest tennis victory" and added "I won that match, and I think it made the Clemson coaches realize they had made a terrific mistake to let me get away".

Spain earned All-SEC honors each of her four years at Georgia and was named to All-American teams three years.

In 1984, she appeared in the 1984 NCAA Division I Women's Tennis Championships and won the singles title. Spain won the Broderick Award (now the Honda Sports Award) as the nation's best female collegiate tennis player in 1984.

== Professional career ==
Short played on the pro circuit from 1984 to 1987, appearing in each of the four grand slam tournaments.

== Awards and honors ==
- 1984 Honda Sports Award (tennis)
- 1995 Georgia Tennis Hall of Fame
- 2000 Colquitt County Sports Hall of Fame
- 2008 Southern Tennis Hall of Fame.
- 2011 Georgia Sports Hall of Fame
