= 1986 Wimbledon Championships – Men's doubles =

Men's doubles
- 1986 Wimbledon Championships

Final
- Champions: (Sweden) Joakim Nyström (Sweden) Mats Wilander
- Runners-up: (United States) Gary Donnelly (United States) Peter Fleming
- Score: 7–6^{(7–4)}, 6–3, 6–3

Details
- Draw: 64 (5 Q / 4 WC )
- Seeds: 16

Events
| Singles | men | women | | boys | girls |
| Doubles | men | women | mixed | boys | girls |
| WC Singles | men | women | quad |
| WC Doubles | men | women | quad |
| Legends | men | women | seniors |
| ← 1985 · | Wimbledon Championships | · 1987 → |

Heinz Günthardt and Balázs Taróczy were the defending champions, but lost in the first round to Sammy Giammalva and Greg Holmes.

Joakim Nyström and Mats Wilander defeated Gary Donnelly and Peter Fleming in the final, 7–6^{(7–4)}, 6–3, 6–3 to win the gentlemen's doubles title at the 1986 Wimbledon Championships.

== Seeds ==
1. (Sweden) Stefan Edberg / (Sweden) Anders Järryd (first round)
2. (United States) Ken Flach / (United States) Robert Seguso (quarterfinals)
3. (Australia) John Fitzgerald / (Czechoslovakia) Tomáš Šmíd (second round)
4. (Chile) Hans Gildemeister / (Ecuador) Andrés Gómez (first round)
5. (United States) Scott Davis / (United States) David Pate (first round)
6. (United States) Paul Annacone / (South Africa) Christo van Rensburg (semifinals)
7. (Sweden) Joakim Nyström / (Sweden) Mats Wilander (champions)
8. (Switzerland) Heinz Günthardt / (Hungary) Balázs Taróczy (first round)
9. (Poland) Wojciech Fibak / (France) Guy Forget (third round)
10. (Spain) Sergio Casal / (Spain) Emilio Sánchez (quarterfinals)
11. (Australia) Peter McNamara / (Australia) Paul McNamee (third round)
12. (United States) Gary Donnelly / (United States) Peter Fleming (final)
13. (Australia) Mark Edmondson / (Australia) Kim Warwick (first round)
14. (France) Henri Leconte / (United States) Sherwood Stewart (first round)
15. (Australia) Pat Cash / (United States) Kevin Curren (third round)
16. (Switzerland) Jakob Hlasek / (Czechoslovakia) Pavel Složil (semifinals)

Click on the seed number of a player to go to their draw section.

== Draw ==
=== Key ===
- Q = Qualifier
- WC = Wild card
- LL = Lucky loser
- Alt = Alternate
- ITF = ITF entry
- PR = Protected ranking
- SR = Special ranking
- SE = Special exempt
- JE = Junior exempt
- JR = Junior Accelerator Programme entrant
- CO = College Accelerator Programme entrant
- NG = Next Gen Accelerator Program entrant
- w/o = Walkover
- r = Retired
- d = Defaulted

=== Finals ===
Quarterfinals
16 | (Switzerland) Jakob Hlasek (Czechoslovakia) Pavel Složil | 1 | 6 | 6 | 3 | 8
10 | (Spain) Sergio Casal (Spain) Emilio Sánchez | 6 | 3 | 4 | 6 | 6
(United States) Martin Davis (Australia) Brad Drewett | 6 | 6 | 6 | 1
12 | (United States) Gary Donnelly (United States) Peter Fleming | 7 | 3 | 7 | 6
6 | (United States) Paul Annacone (South Africa) Christo van Rensburg | 7 | 7 | 6 | 6
(Australia) Laurie Warder (Australia) Simon Youl | 5 | 6 | 7 | 2
7 | (Sweden) Joakim Nyström (Sweden) Mats Wilander | 3 | 4 | 7 | 6 | 11
2 | (United States) Ken Flach (United States) Robert Seguso | 6 | 6 | 6 | 4 | 9

Semifinals
16 | (Switzerland) Jakob Hlasek (Czechoslovakia) Pavel Složil | 4 | 5 | 6 | 4
12 | (United States) Gary Donnelly (United States) Peter Fleming | 6 | 7 | 3 | 6
6 | (United States) Paul Annacone (South Africa) Christo van Rensburg | 6 | 3 | 6 | 3
7 | (Sweden) Joakim Nyström (Sweden) Mats Wilander | 4 | 6 | 7 | 6

Final
12 | (United States) Gary Donnelly (United States) Peter Fleming | 6^{4} | 3 | 3
7 | (Sweden) Joakim Nyström (Sweden) Mats Wilander | 7^{7} | 6 | 6

=== Top half ===
==== Section 1 ====
First round
1 | (Sweden) S Edberg (Sweden) A Järryd | 7 | 6 | 1 | 4 | 4
(United States) Ti Gullikson (United States) To Gullikson | 6 | 4 | 6 | 6 | 6
(Australia) D Graham (United States) K Richter | 5 | 6 | 6 | 4 | 6
(Israel) S Glickstein (Sweden) H Simonsson | 7 | 2 | 4 | 6 | 4
Q | (Soviet Union) A Chesnokov (United States) K Jones | 6 | 1 | 7 | 5 | 2
(Mexico) J Lozano (United States) T Witsken | 3 | 6 | 6 | 7 | 6
(United States) D Dowlen (United States) B Schultz | 7 | 3 | 4 | 6 | 3
16 | (Switzerland) J Hlasek (Czechoslovakia) P Složil | 6 | 6 | 6 | 3 | 6
10 | (Spain) S Casal (Spain) E Sánchez | 2 | 7 | 4 | 7 | 6
WC | (United Kingdom) J Bates (United Kingdom) N Fulwood | 6 | 6 | 6 | 6 | 3
(Australia) D Cahill (Australia) M Kratzmann | 6 | 6 | 6 | 6
(United States) A Kohlberg (United States) L Stefanki | 4 | 7 | 3 | 4
(United States) M De Palmer (United States) B Testerman | 5 | 6 | 4 | 6
(New Zealand) K Evernden (United States) C Hooper | 7 | 4 | 6 | 7
(United States) S Giammalva (United States) G Holmes | 2 | 6 | 6 | 3 | 6
8 | (Switzerland) H Günthardt (Hungary) B Taróczy | 6 | 4 | 4 | 6 | 3

Second round
(United States) Ti Gullikson (United States) To Gullikson | 6 | 6 | 6
(Australia) D Graham (United States) K Richter | 7 | 7 | 7
(Mexico) J Lozano (United States) T Witsken | 6 | 6 | 6 | 3
16 | (Switzerland) J Hlasek (Czechoslovakia) P Složil | 7 | 7 | 2 | 6
10 | (Spain) S Casal (Spain) E Sánchez | 3 | 7 | 6 | 6
(Australia) D Cahill (Australia) M Kratzmann | 6 | 6 | 4 | 4
(New Zealand) K Evernden (United States) C Hooper | 6 | 6 | 7
(United States) S Giammalva (United States) G Holmes | 3 | 4 | 6

Third round
(Australia) D Graham (United States) K Richter | 6 | 4 | 1
16 | (Switzerland) J Hlasek (Czechoslovakia) P Složil | 7 | 6 | 6
10 | (Spain) S Casal (Spain) E Sánchez | 3 | 4 | 7 | 6 | 10
7 | (New Zealand) K Evernden (United States) C Hooper | 6 | 6 | 6 | 4 | 8

Quarterfinals
16 | (Switzerland) J Hlasek (Czechoslovakia) P Složil | 1 | 6 | 6 | 3 | 8
10 | (Spain) S Casal (Spain) E Sánchez | 6 | 3 | 4 | 6 | 6

==== Section 2 ====
First round
4 | (Chile) H Gildemeister (Ecuador) A Gómez | 4 | 4 | 0^{r}
(United States) B Gilbert (United States) B Teacher | 6 | 6 | 0
(United States) M Davis (Australia) B Drewett | 6 | 7 | 6
Q | (United States) R Leach (United States) B Pearce | 4 | 5 | 4
WC | (United Kingdom) A Castle (United Kingdom) J Turner | 6 | 7 | 4 | 7
(Sweden) R Båthman (Sweden) M Tideman | 4 | 5 | 6 | 6
(Netherlands) M Schapers (Australia) M Woodforde | 6 | 6 | 6
14 | (France) H Leconte (United States) S Stewart | 3 | 3 | 4
12 | (United States) G Donnelly (United States) P Fleming | 6 | 6 | 6
(Canada) G Michibata (United States) E Teltscher | 1 | 2 | 2
Q | (United States) M Bauer (Argentina) R Saad | 6 | 3 | 6 | 7 | 3
(India) A Amritraj (India) V Amritraj | 4 | 6 | 7 | 5 | 6
(South Africa) M Robertson (United States) T Warneke | 6 | 4 | 5
(South Africa) C Steyn (South Africa) D Visser | 7 | 6 | 7
(Brazil) D Campos (Brazil) C Kirmayr | 6 | 6 | 6 | 7
5 | (United States) S Davis (United States) D Pate | 3 | 7 | 3 | 5

Second round
(United States) B Gilbert (United States) B Teacher | 2 | 6 | 6
(United States) M Davis (Australia) B Drewett | 6 | 7 | 7
WC | (United Kingdom) A Castle (United Kingdom) J Turner | 6 | 5 | 4
(Netherlands) M Schapers (Australia) M Woodforde | 7 | 7 | 6
12 | (United States) G Donnelly (United States) P Fleming | 6 | 6 | 6
(India) A Amritraj (India) V Amritraj | 4 | 4 | 4
(South Africa) C Steyn (South Africa) D Visser | 6 | 6 | 6
(Brazil) D Campos (Brazil) C Kirmayr | 4 | 4 | 2

Third round
(United States) M Davis (Australia) B Drewett | 3 | 6 | 7 | 7
(Netherlands) M Schapers (Australia) M Woodforde | 6 | 3 | 6 | 5
12 | (United States) G Donnelly (United States) P Fleming | 6 | 7 | 5 | 6
(South Africa) C Steyn (South Africa) D Visser | 4 | 6 | 7 | 2

Quarterfinals
4 | (United States) M Davis (Australia) B Drewett | 6 | 6 | 6 | 1
12 | (United States) G Donnelly (United States) P Fleming | 7 | 3 | 7 | 6

=== Bottom half ===
==== Section 3 ====
First round
6 | (United States) P Annacone (South Africa) C van Rensburg | 7 | 7 | 6
(Sweden) P Carlsson (Sweden) J Svensson | 6 | 5 | 3
Q | (United States) P Chamberlin (United States) J Klaparda | 4 | 6 | 6 | 6 | 6
(United Kingdom) C Dowdeswell (United States) B Levine | 6 | 7 | 2 | 2 | 4
(Spain) D de Miguel (Brazil) J Soares | 1 | 7 | 6 | 3
(United Kingdom) D Felgate (United Kingdom) S Shaw | 6 | 6 | 7 | 6
(Israel) A Mansdorf (Israel) S Perkiss | 4 | 2 | 6 | 7 | 4
11 | (Australia) P McNamara (Australia) P McNamee | 6 | 6 | 4 | 6 | 6
13 | (Australia) M Edmondson (Australia) K Warwick | 6 | 6 | 3
(United States) C Kennedy (Australia) D Tyson | 7 | 7 | 6
(United States) S Denton (United States) L Shiras | 4 | 7 | 3 | 4
(Australia) L Warder (Australia) S Youl | 6 | 6 | 6 | 6
(Australia) B Dyke (Australia) W Masur | 6 | 6 | 7 | 6 | 7
(United States) M Leach (United States) T Wilkison | 4 | 7 | 5 | 7 | 5
WC | (United Kingdom) N Brown (United Kingdom) J Smith | 4 | 3 | 4
3 | (Australia) J Fitzgerald (Czechoslovakia) T Šmíd | 6 | 6 | 6

Second round
6 | (United States) P Annacone (South Africa) C van Rensburg | 3 | 6 | 6 | 6 | 6
Q | (United States) P Chamberlin (United States) J Klaparda | 6 | 3 | 7 | 4 | 3
(United Kingdom) D Felgate (United Kingdom) S Shaw | 3 | 3 | 4
11 | (Australia) P McNamara (Australia) P McNamee | 6 | 6 | 6
(United States) C Kennedy (Australia) D Tyson | 4 | 4 | 5
(Australia) L Warder (Australia) S Youl | 6 | 6 | 7
(Australia) B Dyke (Australia) W Masur | 7 | 6 | 7 | 3 | 6
3 | (Australia) J Fitzgerald (Czechoslovakia) T Šmíd | 6 | 7 | 6 | 6 | 3

Third round
6 | (United States) P Annacone (South Africa) C van Rensburg | 7 | 7 | 6
11 | (Australia) P McNamara (Australia) P McNamee | 6 | 6 | 4
(Australia) L Warder (Australia) S Youl | 7 | 3 | 6 | 4 | 7
3 | (Australia) B Dyke (Australia) W Masur | 6 | 6 | 3 | 6 | 5

Quarterfinals
6 | (United States) P Annacone (South Africa) C van Rensburg | 7 | 7 | 6 | 6
(Australia) L Warder (Australia) S Youl | 5 | 6 | 7 | 2

==== Section 4 ====
First round
7 | (Sweden) J Nyström (Sweden) M Wilander | 6 | 6 | 6
(Argentina) G Luza (Argentina) G Tiberti | 4 | 2 | 2
WC | (United Kingdom) J Goodall (United Kingdom) R Whichello | 5 | 2 | 2
(United States) J Kriek (United Kingdom) J Lloyd | 7 | 6 | 6
(Sweden) P Hjertquist (United States) C Wittus | 2 | 4 | 7 | 5
(United States) C Cox (Nigeria) N Odizor | 6 | 6 | 6 | 7
(Sweden) P Lundgren (Sweden) S Svensson | 3 | 4 | 4
9 | (Poland) W Fibak (France) G Forget | 6 | 6 | 6
15 | (Australia) P Cash (United States) K Curren | 6 | 7 | 6
(South Africa) E Edwards (Paraguay) F González | 3 | 5 | 3
(United States) L Bourne (New Zealand) R Simpson | 6 | 4 | 6 | 6 | 6
Q | (Colombia) Á Jordan (United States) J Pugh | 3 | 6 | 7 | 4 | 4
(Australia) M Fancutt (United States) C Strode | 5 | 7 | 4 | 6 | 3
(Sweden) J Gunnarsson (Denmark) M Mortensen | 7 | 6 | 6 | 3 | 6
(Chile) R Acuña (United States) C Dunk | 2 | 6 | 6 | 1
2 | (United States) K Flach (United States) R Seguso | 6 | 7 | 3 | 6

Second round
7 | (Sweden) J Nyström (Sweden) M Wilander | 6 | 3 | 6 | 6
(United States) J Kriek (United Kingdom) J Lloyd | 3 | 6 | 3 | 4
(United States) C Cox (Nigeria) N Odizor | 3 | 7 | 7 | 4 | 4
9 | (Poland) W Fibak (France) G Forget | 6 | 6 | 6 | 6 | 6
15 | (Australia) P Cash (United States) K Curren | 6 | 6 | 6
(United States) L Bourne (New Zealand) R Simpson | 4 | 3 | 2
(Sweden) J Gunnarsson (Denmark) M Mortensen | 7 | 3 | 6 | 6 | 3
2 | (United States) K Flach (United States) R Seguso | 5 | 6 | 7 | 4 | 6

Third round
7 | (Sweden) J Nyström (Sweden) M Wilander | 7 | 6 | 5 | 7
9 | (Poland) W Fibak (France) G Forget | 6 | 3 | 7 | 5
15 | (Australia) P Cash (United States) K Curren | 2 | 5 | 4
2 | (United States) K Flach (United States) R Seguso | 6 | 7 | 6

Quarterfinals
7 | (Sweden) J Nyström (Sweden) M Wilander | 3 | 4 | 7 | 6 | 11
2 | (United States) K Flach (United States) R Seguso | 6 | 6 | 6 | 4 | 9
