= Catarina Lindqvist =

Swedish tennis player (born 1963)

- Country (sports): Sweden
- Residence: Höllviken, Sweden & Rumson, New Jersey, US
- Born: 13 June 1963 (age 63) Kristinehamn, Sweden
- Turned pro: 1983
- Retired: 1992
- Plays: Right-handed (one handed-backhand)
- Prize money: US$1,126,665

Singles
- Career record: 297–207
- Career titles: 5
- Highest ranking: No. 10 (15 April 1985)

Grand Slam singles results
- Australian Open: SF (1987)
- French Open: 4R (1986)
- Wimbledon: SF (1989)
- US Open: 4R (1985, 1986, 1987)

Doubles
- Career record: 30–70
- Career titles: 0
- Highest ranking: No. 29 (11 April 1988)

Grand Slam doubles results
- Australian Open: QF (1985, 1987)
- US Open: QF (1985)

Mixed doubles
- Career titles: 0

Grand Slam mixed doubles results
- Australian Open: 1R (1989)
- French Open: 2R (1987)
- Wimbledon: 2R (1987, 1988)

Anna Catarina Lindqvist Ryan (born 13 June 1963) is a former professional tennis player from Sweden.

== Career ==
Lindqvist turned professional in 1983. She reached a career high rank of World No. 10 in April 1985 and won five singles titles. She reached the semifinals of Grand Slam tournaments twice, the Australian Open in 1987 and Wimbledon in 1989. She lost to Martina Navratilova in both semifinals. She retired from tennis in 1992.

Lindqvist six WTA Tour singles titles and one doubles title. She had career wins over Steffi Graf, Virginia Wade, Pam Shriver, Hana Mandlíková, Wendy Turnbull, Manuela Maleeva, Nathalie Tauziat, Dianne Fromholtz, Helena Suková, Claudia Kohde-Kilsch, Zina Garrison, Kathy Jordan, Jo Durie, and Natasha Zvereva.

She currently resides in New Jersey, and is the mother of Joakim Ryan, a defenseman for the Carolina Hurricanes.

In 2009, Lindqvist and her husband Bill Ryan bought the East Brunswick Racquet Club in East Brunswick, New Jersey, where currently Lindqvist is the head teaching pro.

== WTA Tour finals ==
=== Singles: 10 (5–5) ===
Winner – Legend Grand Slam tournaments (0–0) WTA Tour Championships (0–0) Tier I (0–0) Tier II (0–0) Tier III (0–0) Tier IV (1–1) Tier V (1–0) Virginia Slims (3–4)	Finals by surface Hard (2–1) Grass (0–0) Clay (0–1) Carpet (3–3)

Result	W/L	Date	Tournament	Surface	Opponent	Score
Win	1–0	Jan 1984	Hershey, U.S.	Carpet (i)	(United States) Beth Herr	6–4, 6–0
Win	2–0	Oct 1984	Filderstadt, West Germany	Carpet (i)	(West Germany) Steffi Graf	6–1, 6–4
Win	3–0	Dec 1984	Port St. Lucie, U.S.	Hard	(United States) Terry Holladay	6–3, 6–1
Loss	3–1	Mar 1985	Princeton, U.S.	Carpet (i)	(Czechoslovakia) Hana Mandlíková	3–6, 5–7
Loss	3–2	Oct 1985	Filderstadt, West Germany	Carpet (i)	(United States) Pam Shriver	1–6, 5–7
Loss	3–3	Oct 1986	Brighton, UK	Carpet (i)	(West Germany) Steffi Graf	3–6, 3–6
Loss	3–4	Jul 1987	Båstad, Sweden	Clay	(Italy) Sandra Cecchini	4–6, 4–6
Loss	3–5	Jan 1989	Sydney, Australia	Hard	(United States) Martina Navratilova	2–6, 4–6
Win	4–5	Apr 1990	Tokyo, Japan	Hard	(Australia) Elizabeth Smylie	6–3, 6–2
Win	5–5	Feb 1991	Oslo, Norway	Carpet (i)	(Italy) Raffaella Reggi	6–3, 6–0

=== Doubles: 2 (0–2) ===
Winner – Legend Grand Slam tournaments (0–0) WTA Tour Championships (0–0) Tier I (0–0) Tier II (0–0) Tier III (0–0) Tier IV (0–1) Tier V (0–0) Virginia Slims (0–1)	Finals by surface Hard (0–0) Grass (0–0) Clay (0–1) Carpet (0–1)

Result	W/L	Date	Tournament	Surface	Partner	Opponents	Score
Loss	0–1	May 1987	Berlin, West Germany	Clay	(Denmark) Tine Scheuer-Larsen	(West Germany) Claudia Kohde-Kilsch (Czechoslovakia) Helena Suková	1–6, 2–6
Loss	0–2	Feb 1988	Oklahoma City, U.S.	Carpet (i)	(Denmark) Tine Scheuer-Larsen	(Czechoslovakia) Jana Novotná (France) Catherine Suire	4–6, 4–6

== Grand Slam tournaments performance timeline ==
Key
W	F	SF	QF	#R	RR	Q#	DNQ	A	NH

(W) winner; (F) finalist; (SF) semifinalist; (QF) quarterfinalist; (#R) rounds 4, 3, 2, 1; (RR) round-robin stage; (Q#) qualification round; (DNQ) did not qualify; (A) absent; (NH) not held; (SR) strike rate (events won / competed); (W–L) win–loss record.

=== Singles ===
Tournament	1981	1982	1983	1984	1985	1986	1987	1988	1989	1990	1991	1992	Career SR
Australian Open	A	A	A	2R	QF	NH	SF	4R	QF	A	2R	2R	0 / 7
French Open	A	A	2R	2R	2R	4R	2R	1R	1R	1R	A	1R	0 / 9
Wimbledon	A	A	1R	2R	1R	QF	4R	1R	SF	1R	4R	2R	0 / 10
US Open	A	1R	A	3R	4R	4R	4R	1R	1R	1R	2R	1R	0 / 10
SR	0 / 0	0 / 1	0 / 2	0 / 4	0 / 4	0 / 3	0 / 4	0 / 4	0 / 4	0 / 3	0 / 3	0 / 4	0 / 36
Year End Ranking	148	131	115	18	13	17	16	42	16	38	46	63	

== ITF finals ==
=== Singles finals: (3-2) ===
$100,000 tournaments
$75,000 tournaments
$50,000 tournaments
$25,000 tournaments
$10,000 tournaments

Result	No.	Date	Tournament	Surface	Opponent	Score
Win	1.	3 January 1983	Chicago, United States	Hard	(Sweden) Elisabeth Ekblom	1–6, 6–4, 6–3
Loss	2.	7 November 1983	Gothenburg, Sweden	Hard	(Sweden) Lena Sandin	2–6, 0–6
Loss	3.	8 July 1985	Landskrona, Sweden	Clay	(Sweden) Karolina Karlsson	6–7, 2–6
Win	4.	7 July 1986	Båstad, Sweden	Clay	(Sweden) Catrin Jexell	6–2, 6–0
Win	5.	11 February 1991	Danderyd, Sweden	Carpet (i)	(Belgium) Els Callens	6–4, 4–6, 6–2

=== Doubles finals: (1-1) ===
Result	No	Date	Tournament	Surface	Partner	Opponents	Score
Loss	1.	11 July 1983	Båstad, Sweden	Clay	(Sweden) Maria Lindström	(Germany) Gabriela Dinu (Italy) Patrizia Murgo	2–6, 6–4, 4–6
Win	2.	7 July 1986	Båstad, Sweden	Clay	(Sweden) Maria Lindström	(Germany) Christina Singer (Germany) Ellen Walliser	6–3, 6–2
