= Jenni Goodling =

American tennis player

- Full name: Jennifer Goodling
- Country (sports): United States
- Born: April 26, 1962 (age 62)
- Prize money: $64,269

Singles
- Career record: 50–104
- Highest ranking: No. 187 (January 17, 1983)

Grand Slam singles results
- Australian Open: 1R (1988)

Doubles
- Career record: 87–93
- Highest ranking: No. 116 (January 19, 1987)

Grand Slam doubles results
- Australian Open: 3R (1988)
- French Open: 1R (1981, 1986, 1988)
- Wimbledon: 2R (1981)
- US Open: 2R (1981, 1982)

Jennifer Goodling (born April 26, 1962) is a former professional tennis player from the United States.

== Biography ==
=== Early life ===
Goodling grew up in York, Pennsylvania, the daughter of a US congressman. Her grandfather George Atlee Goodling had also been a US congressman from Pennsylvania, before being succeeded by his son, Jennifer's father William F. Goodling, in 1975.

She went to both Dallastown Area High School and York Country Day School.

=== Tennis career ===
Goodling began her career on the WTA Tour in 1980 as an amateur and in the early 1980s attended Rollins College in Florida. In her All-American season at Rollins College in 1983, Goodling represented the United States at the University Games in Alberta.

After graduating from Rollins College in 1985, Goodling began touring professionally. At the 1988 Australian Open she featured in the singles main draw as a qualifier and made the round of 16 of the women's doubles. She was most successful in the doubles format, appearing in the women's doubles main draws of all four grand slam tournaments.

She still lives in Pennsylvania and is working as a tennis instructor.
