= Kay McDaniel =

American tennis player

- Country (sports): United States
- Born: September 25, 1957
- Died: January 3, 2025 (age 67)
- Prize money: $46,756

Singles
- Highest ranking: 53 (December 31, 1979)

Grand Slam singles results
- French Open: 1R (1979)
- Wimbledon: 3R (1979)
- US Open: 1R (1979)

Grand Slam doubles results
- French Open: 1R (1979, 1985)
- Wimbledon: 3R (1979)
- US Open: 2R (1979)

Kay McDaniel (September 25, 1957 – January 3, 2025) was an American professional tennis player.

== Biography ==
Originally from Shreveport, Louisiana, McDaniel was a three-time All-American tennis player at Louisiana State University in the late 1970s.

McDaniel had her best run in a grand slam tournament at the 1979 Wimbledon Championships, with wins over Katja Ebbinghaus and Marie Pinterová, before losing in the third round to 15th seed Betty Stöve in three sets.

In 1980, she achieved a rare feat when she won an Avon Futures title in Atlanta as a lucky loser.

She achieved her highest year end ranking in 1979, where she finished at 53.

McDaniel was a professor at Lee University, where she taught health science. She annually ran a free summer camp for kids on the university grounds.
