= 1986 Wimbledon Championships =

- Date: 23 June – 6 July
- Edition: 100th
- Category: Grand Slam
- Draw: 128S/64D/64XD
- Prize money: £2,119,780
- Surface: Grass
- Location: Church Road; SW19, Wimbledon, London, United Kingdom
- Venue: All England Lawn Tennis and Croquet Club

Champions

Men's singles
- (West Germany) Boris Becker

Women's singles
- (United States) Martina Navratilova

Men's doubles
- (Sweden) Joakim Nyström / (Sweden) Mats Wilander

Women's doubles
- (United States) Martina Navratilova / (United States) Pam Shriver

Mixed doubles
- (United States) Ken Flach / (United States) Kathy Jordan

Boys' singles
- (Mexico) Eduardo Vélez

Girls' singles
- (Soviet Union) Natasha Zvereva

Boys' doubles
- (Spain) Tomás Carbonell / (Czechoslovakia) Petr Korda

Girls' doubles
- (Australia) Michelle Jaggard / (Australia) Lisa O'Neill
← 1985 ·	Wimbledon Championships	· 1987 →

The 1986 Wimbledon Championships was a tennis tournament played on grass courts at the All England Lawn Tennis and Croquet Club in Wimbledon, London in the United Kingdom. It was the 100th edition of the Wimbledon Championships and were held from 23 June to 6 July 1986.

For the first time yellow balls were used during the tournament. In recognition of the 100th championship, the two oldest living singles champions were invited to present the singles championship trophies: Jean Borotra presented the gentlemen's singles and Kitty Godfree presented the ladies', both alongside the President of the All England Club Prince Edward, Duke of Kent and his wife.

== Prize money ==
The total prize money for 1986 championships was £2,119,780. The winner of the men's title earned £140,000 while the women's singles champion earned £126,000.

Event	W	F	SF	QF	Round of 16	Round of 32	Round of 64	Round of 128
Men's singles	£140,000	£70,000	£35,000	£17,725	£9,330	£5,225	£3,080	£1,880
Women's singles	£126,000	£63,000	£30,700	£15,025	£7,485	£4,040	£2,380	£1,450
Men's doubles *	£48,500	£24,250	£12,130	£6,160	£3,180	£1,680	£980	—
Women's doubles *	£42,060	£21,030	£9,700	£4,930	£2,390	£1,250	£720	—
Mixed doubles *	£25,200	£12,600	£6,300	£2,930	£1,470	£730	£330	—

_{* per team}

== Champions ==
=== Seniors ===
==== Men's singles ====
(West Germany) Boris Becker defeated (Czechoslovakia) Ivan Lendl, 6–4, 6–3, 7–5

- It was Becker's 2nd career Grand Slam title and his 2nd consecutive Wimbledon title.

==== Women's singles ====
(United States) Martina Navratilova defeated (Czechoslovakia) Hana Mandlíková, 7–6^{(7–1)}, 6–3

- It was Navratilova's 39th career Grand Slam title and her 7th Wimbledon single's title.

==== Men's doubles ====
(Sweden) Joakim Nyström / (Sweden) Mats Wilander defeated (United States) Gary Donnelly / (United States) Peter Fleming, 7–6^{(7–4)}, 6–3, 6–3

- It was Nyström's only career Grand Slam title. It was Wilander's 5th career Grand Slam title and his only Wimbledon title.

==== Women's doubles ====
(United States) Martina Navratilova / (United States) Pam Shriver defeated (Czechoslovakia) Hana Mandlíková / (Australia) Wendy Turnbull, 6–1, 6–3

- It was Navratilova's 40th career Grand Slam title and her 15th Wimbledon title. It was Shriver's 14th career Grand Slam title and her 5th Wimbledon title.

==== Mixed doubles ====
(United States) Ken Flach / (United States) Kathy Jordan defeated (Switzerland) Heinz Günthardt / (United States) Martina Navratilova, 6–3, 7–6^{(9–7)}

- It was Flach's 3rd career Grand Slam title and his 1st Wimbledon title. It was Jordan's 7th and last career Grand Slam title and her 3rd Wimbledon title.

=== Juniors ===
==== Boys' singles ====
(Mexico) Eduardo Vélez defeated (Spain) Javier Sánchez, 6–3, 7–5

==== Girls' singles ====
(Soviet Union) Natasha Zvereva defeated (Soviet Union) Leila Meskhi, 2–6, 6–2, 9–7

==== Boys' doubles ====
(Spain) Tomás Carbonell / (Czechoslovakia) Petr Korda defeated (Australia) Shane Barr / (Canada) Hubert Karrasch, 6–1, 6–1

==== Girls' doubles ====
(Australia) Michelle Jaggard / (Australia) Lisa O'Neill defeated (Soviet Union) Leila Meskhi / (Soviet Union) Natasha Zvereva, 7–6^{(7–3)}, 6–7^{(4–7)}, 6–4

== Singles seeds ==
=== Men's singles ===
1. (Czechoslovakia) Ivan Lendl (final, lost to Boris Becker)
2. (Sweden) Mats Wilander (fourth round, lost to Pat Cash)
3. (United States) Jimmy Connors (first round, lost to Robert Seguso)
4. (West Germany) Boris Becker (champion)
5. (Sweden) Stefan Edberg (third round, lost to Miloslav Mečíř)
6. (Sweden) Joakim Nyström (third round, lost to Ramesh Krishnan)
7. (France) Henri Leconte (semifinals, lost to Boris Becker)
8. (Sweden) Anders Järryd (second round, lost to Eddie Edwards)
9. (Ecuador) Andrés Gómez (first round, lost to John Fitzgerald)
10. (United States) Tim Mayotte (quarterfinals, lost to Ivan Lendl)
11. (United States) Kevin Curren (first round, lost to Eric Jelen)
12. (United States) Brad Gilbert (fourth round, lost to Miloslav Mečíř)
13. (Sweden) Mikael Pernfors (fourth round, lost to Boris Becker)
14. (Argentina) Martín Jaite (second round, lost to Ken Flach)
15. (Argentina) Guillermo Vilas (first round, lost to Pat Cash)
16. (United States) Johan Kriek (second round, lost to John Sadri)

=== Women's singles ===
1. (United States) Martina Navratilova (champion)
2. (United States) Chris Evert Lloyd (semifinals, lost to Hana Mandlíková)
3. (Czechoslovakia) Hana Mandlíková (final, lost to Martina Navratilova)
4. (West Germany) Claudia Kohde-Kilsch (third round, lost to Raffaella Reggi)
5. (United States) Pam Shriver (first round, lost to Betsy Nagelsen)
6. (United States) Kathy Rinaldi (first round, lost to Nathalie Herreman)
7. (Czechoslovakia) Helena Suková (quarterfinals, lost to Chris Evert Lloyd)
8. (Bulgaria) Manuela Maleeva (fourth round, lost to Bettina Bunge)
9. (United States) Zina Garrison (second round, lost to Anne Hobbs)
10. (Argentina) Gabriela Sabatini (semifinals, lost to Martina Navratilova)
11. (Canada) Carling Bassett (fourth round, lost to Hana Mandlíková)
12. (United States) Stephanie Rehe (first round, lost to Larisa Savchenko)
13. (United States) Barbara Potter (withdrew before the tournament began)
14. (Australia) Wendy Turnbull (first round, lost to Jenny Byrne)
15. (Sweden) Catarina Lindqvist (quarterfinals, lost to Gabriela Sabatini)
16. (United States) Kathy Jordan (fourth round, lost to Chris Evert Lloyd)

Preceded by 1986 French Open	Grand Slams	Succeeded by 1986 US Open
