= 1986 French Open – Women's singles qualifying =

Women's singles qualifying
- 1986 French Open

Events
Singles	men	women		boys	girls
Doubles	men	women	mixed	boys	girls
WC Singles	men	women	quad
WC Doubles	men	women	quad
Legends	−45	45+	women

Qualification
Singles	men	women
- French Open

Players who neither had high enough rankings nor received wild cards to enter the main draw of the annual French Open Tennis Championships participated in a qualifying tournament held in the week before the event.

== Qualifiers ==
1. (Argentina) Patricia Tarabini
2. (Czechoslovakia) Jana Novotná
3. (Argentina) Mariana Pérez Roldán
4. (Sweden) Helena Dahlström
5. (Argentina) Ivanna Madruga
6. (Italy) Sabina Simmonds
7. (Italy) Federica Bonsignori
8. (West Germany) Silke Meier

== Lucky losers ==
1. (Czechoslovakia) Marcela Skuherská

== Qualifying draw ==
Key

- Q = Qualifier
- WC = Wild card
- LL = Lucky loser
- Alt = Alternate
- ITF = ITF entry
- PR = Protected ranking
- SR = Special ranking
- SE = Special exempt
- JE = Junior exempt
- JR = Junior Accelerator Programme entrant
- CO = College Accelerator Programme entrant
- NG = Next Gen Accelerator Program entrant
- w/o = Walkover
- r = Retired
- d = Defaulted

=== First qualifier ===
First round
(West Germany) Heidi Eisterlehner	4	6	6
(Japan) Naoko Sato	6	4	4
(Argentina) Patricia Tarabini	6	6
(West Germany) Cornelia Lechner	2	3
(West Germany) Petra Keppeler	6	5	4
(United States) Amy Schwartz	4	7	6
(Argentina) Andrea Tiezzi	3	3
(Peru) Pilar Vásquez	6	6

Second round
(West Germany) Heidi Eisterlehner	1	1
(Argentina) Patricia Tarabini	6	6
(United States) Amy Schwartz	6	2	6
(Peru) Pilar Vásquez	3	6	1

Qualifying competition
(Argentina) Patricia Tarabini	6	6
(United States) Amy Schwartz	0	0

=== Second qualifier ===
First round
(United States) Kim Steinmetz	4	2
(Brazil) Gisele Miró	6	6
(Netherlands) Karin Moos	4	6	5
(Netherlands) Carin Bakkum	6	1	7
(France) Frédérique Martin	3	5
(Czechoslovakia) Jana Novotná	6	7
(Sweden) Anna-Karin Olsson	7	1	7
(United Kingdom) Sally Reeves	5	6	5

Second round
(Brazil) Gisele Miró	6^{7}	7	6
(Netherlands) Carin Bakkum	7^{9}	5	2
(Czechoslovakia) Jana Novotná	6	6
(Sweden) Anna-Karin Olsson	3	3

Qualifying competition
(Brazil) Gisele Miró	6	4	1
(Czechoslovakia) Jana Novotná	3	6	6

=== Third qualifier ===
First round
(Brazil) Cláudia Monteiro	2	2
(Australia) Michelle Jaggard-Lai	6	6
(United States) Diane Farrell	0	1
(Argentina) Mariana Pérez Roldán	6	6
(France) Nathalie Guerrée-Spitzer	6	6
(France) Florence Gauvain	0	3
(Poland) Iwona Kuczyńska	6	6
Alt	(France) Isabelle Crudo	2	4

Second round
(Australia) Michelle Jaggard-Lai	0	1
(Argentina) Mariana Pérez Roldán	6	6
(France) Nathalie Guerrée-Spitzer	6^{4}	2
(Poland) Iwona Kuczyńska	7^{7}	6

Qualifying competition
(Argentina) Mariana Pérez Roldán	6	6
(Poland) Iwona Kuczyńska	3	2

=== Fourth qualifier ===
First round
(Canada) Jane Young	6	6
(United States) Heather Crowe	4	3
(Czechoslovakia) Regina Rajchrtová	7^{9}	1	2
(France) Catherine Bonnet	6^{7}	6	6
(United States) Joy Cummings	6	7
(Netherlands) Nicole Muns-Jagerman	4	5
(United States) Jenni Goodling	4	6	2
(Sweden) Helena Dahlström	6	2	6

Second round
(Canada) Jane Young	6	6
(France) Catherine Bonnet	1	2
(United States) Joy Cummings	4	3
(Sweden) Helena Dahlström	6	6

Qualifying competition
(Canada) Jane Young	3	2
(Sweden) Helena Dahlström	6	6

=== Fifth qualifier ===
First round
(Australia) Nicole Bradtke	7	6
(South Africa) Dianne Van Rensburg	5	4
(Spain) Arantxa Sánchez Vicario	4	1
(Argentina) Ivanna Madruga	6	6
(Italy) Laura Golarsa	6	6
(Australia) Jackie Masters	2	3
(United States) Jamie Golder	6	6
(United States) Louise Allen	2	3

Second round
(Australia) Nicole Bradtke	6^{3}	1
(Argentina) Ivanna Madruga	7^{7}	6
(Italy) Laura Golarsa	6^{5}	2
(United States) Jamie Golder	7^{7}	6

Qualifying competition
(Argentina) Ivanna Madruga	6	6
(United States) Jamie Golder	1	0

=== Sixth qualifier ===
First round
(Switzerland) Csilla Bartos-Cserepy	6	7
(France) Karine Quentrec	4	5
(Australia) Michelle Turk	2	1
(Italy) Sabina Simmonds	6	6
(France) Nathalie Phan-Thanh	6	6
(Czechoslovakia) Petra Tesařová	3	2
(Czechoslovakia) Hana Fukárková	3	6	6
(United States) Laura Bernstein	6	3	3

Second round
(Switzerland) Csilla Bartos-Cserepy	3	6	4
(Italy) Sabina Simmonds	6	4	6
(France) Nathalie Phan-Thanh	1	6	2
(Czechoslovakia) Hana Fukárková	6	2	6

Qualifying competition
(Italy) Sabina Simmonds	7^{8}	7
(Czechoslovakia) Hana Fukárková	6^{6}	5

=== Seventh qualifier ===
First round
(Czechoslovakia) Marcela Skuherská	6	6
(France) Ellen Walliser	2	4
(Belgium) Kathleen Schuurmans	3	3
(Argentina) Maria Mendez	6	6
(Italy) Caterina Nozzoli	6	6
(France) Ann Garbay	1	1
(Japan) Emiko Okagawa	3	3
(Italy) Federica Bonsignori	6	6

Second round
(Czechoslovakia) Marcela Skuherská	7^{8}	6
(Argentina) Maria Mendez	6^{6}	0
(Italy) Caterina Nozzoli	6^{7}	3
(Italy) Federica Bonsignori	7^{9}	6

Qualifying competition
(Czechoslovakia) Marcela Skuherská	6^{11}	2
(Italy) Federica Bonsignori	7^{13}	6

=== Eighth qualifier ===
First round
(West Germany) Silke Meier	7	6
(United States) Susan Rimes	5	1
(West Germany) Wiltrud Probst	6	6
(Netherlands) Nanette Schutte	3	2
(Netherlands) Hellas ter Riet	6	6
(Australia) Stephanie Faulkner	2	3
(Australia) Annette Smith	1	0
(Sweden) Karolina Karlsson	6	6

Second round
(West Germany) Silke Meier	7	2	6
(West Germany) Wiltrud Probst	5	6	3
(Netherlands) Hellas ter Riet	6	6
(Sweden) Karolina Karlsson	1	0

Qualifying competition
(West Germany) Silke Meier	3	6	7
(Netherlands) Hellas ter Riet	6	3	5
