= 1987 French Open – Women's singles qualifying =

Women's singles qualifying
- 1987 French Open

Events
Singles	men	women		boys	girls
Doubles	men	women	mixed	boys	girls
WC Singles	men	women	quad
WC Doubles	men	women	quad
Legends	−45	45+	women

Qualification
Singles	men	women
- French Open

Players who neither had high enough rankings nor received wild cards to enter the main draw of the annual French Open Tennis Championships participated in a qualifying tournament held in the week before the event.

== Seeds ==
1. (Brazil) Gisele Miró (qualifying competition, lucky loser)
2. (Italy) Laura Golarsa (second round)
3. (United States) Penny Barg (qualified)
4. (Japan) Masako Yanagi (first round)
5. (Czechoslovakia) Radka Zrubáková (qualified)
6. (West Germany) Christina Singer (qualifying competition, lucky loser)
7. (South Africa) Karen Schimper (qualified)
8. (West Germany) Andrea Betzner (second round)
9. (United States) Jamie Golder (first round)
10. (United States) Amy Schwartz (first round)
11. (Sweden) Helena Dahlström (first round)
12. (United States) Jenny Klitch (first round)
13. (Japan) Yukie Koizumi (second round)
14. (Czechoslovakia) Hana Fukárková (qualified)
15. (Czechoslovakia) Regina Rajchrtová (qualified)
16. (Netherlands) Marianne van der Torre (qualifying competition, lucky loser)

== Qualifiers ==
1. (Czechoslovakia) Regina Rajchrtová
2. (Poland) Iwona Kuczyńska
3. (Italy) Linda Ferrando
4. (Belgium) Sandra Wasserman
5. (South Africa) Karen Schimper
6. (United States) Penny Barg
7. (Czechoslovakia) Radka Zrubáková
8. (Czechoslovakia) Hana Fukárková

== Lucky losers ==
1. (West Germany) Christina Singer
2. (Netherlands) Marianne van der Torre
3. (Sweden) Karolina Karlsson
4. (Brazil) Gisele Miró

== Qualifying draw ==
Key

- Q = Qualifier
- WC = Wild card
- LL = Lucky loser
- Alt = Alternate
- ITF = ITF entry
- PR = Protected ranking
- SR = Special ranking
- SE = Special exempt
- JE = Junior exempt
- JR = Junior Accelerator Programme entrant
- CO = College Accelerator Programme entrant
- NG = Next Gen Accelerator Program entrant
- w/o = Walkover
- r = Retired
- d = Defaulted

=== First qualifier ===
First round
1	(Brazil) Gisele Miró	6	6
(Chile) Natalie Rodríguez	0	3
(France) Nathalie Guerrée-Spitzer	3	5
(United States) Sheri Norris	6	7
(France) Sophie Amiach	7	1	2
(Sweden) Annika Karlsson	5	6	6
(France) Karine Quentrec	2	4
15	(Czechoslovakia) Regina Rajchrtová	6	6

Second round
1	(Brazil) Gisele Miró	3	6	6
(United States) Sheri Norris	6	3	0
(Sweden) Annika Karlsson	3	0
15	(Czechoslovakia) Regina Rajchrtová	6	6

Qualifying competition
1	(Brazil) Gisele Miró	3	2
15	(Czechoslovakia) Regina Rajchrtová	6	6

=== Second qualifier ===
First round
13	(Japan) Yukie Koizumi	6	7
(Austria) Barbara Pollet	2	5
(Czechoslovakia) Olga Votavová	4	6	2
(Sweden) Karolina Karlsson	6	3	6
(West Germany) Petra Keppeler	4	5
(Netherlands) Digna Ketelaar	6	7
(Poland) Iwona Kuczyńska	6	6
12	(United States) Jenny Klitch	4	0

Second round
13	(Japan) Yukie Koizumi	2	1
(Sweden) Karolina Karlsson	6	6
(Netherlands) Digna Ketelaar	2	4
(Poland) Iwona Kuczyńska	6	6

Qualifying competition
(Sweden) Karolina Karlsson	2	2
(Poland) Iwona Kuczyńska	6	6

=== Third qualifier ===
First round
4	(Japan) Masako Yanagi	6^{7}	1
(West Germany) Cornelia Lechner	7^{9}	6
(Sweden) Anna-Karin Olsson	2	2
(Netherlands) Brenda Schultz-McCarthy	6	6
(United States) Niurka Sodupe	6	6
(Sweden) Annelie Björk	1	0
(Italy) Linda Ferrando	4	6	6
10	(United States) Amy Schwartz	6	3	4

Second round
(West Germany) Cornelia Lechner	6	3	3
(Netherlands) Brenda Schultz-McCarthy	4	6	6
(United States) Niurka Sodupe	1	7^{7}	2
(Italy) Linda Ferrando	6	6^{3}	6

Qualifying competition
(Netherlands) Brenda Schultz-McCarthy	6^{4}	3
(Italy) Linda Ferrando	7^{7}	6

=== Fourth qualifier ===
First round
9	(United States) Jamie Golder	6	3	4
(Belgium) Sandra Wasserman	4	6	6
(Brazil) Luciana Corsato-Owsianka	1	1
(France) Marie-Christine Damas	6	6
(France) Catherine Mothes-Jobkel	0	1
(France) Virginie Paquet	6	6
(France) Cécille Calmette	3	6	3
6	(West Germany) Christina Singer	6	3	6

Second round
(Belgium) Sandra Wasserman	6	6
(France) Marie-Christine Damas	3	2
(France) Virginie Paquet	3	6	3
6	(West Germany) Christina Singer	6	3	6

Qualifying competition
(Belgium) Sandra Wasserman	6	6
6	(West Germany) Christina Singer	2	4

=== Fifth qualifier ===
First round
7	(South Africa) Karen Schimper	6	6
(Australia) Lisa O'Neill	0	1
(Netherlands) Carin Bakkum	1	0
(Austria) Beate Reinstadler	6	6
(Argentina) Andrea Tiezzi	6	4	6
(Netherlands) Nanette Schutte	3	6	3
(United States) Amy Frazier	1	6	6
11	(Sweden) Helena Dahlström	6	3	3

Second round
7	(South Africa) Karen Schimper	6	6
(Austria) Beate Reinstadler	1	2
(Argentina) Andrea Tiezzi	6	7
(United States) Amy Frazier	3	5

Qualifying competition
7	(South Africa) Karen Schimper	6	6
(Argentina) Andrea Tiezzi	0	4

=== Sixth qualifier ===
First round
8	(West Germany) Andrea Betzner	6	7^{7}
(France) Isabelle Crudo	2	6^{3}
(United States) Melissa Brown	7	6
(Sweden) Elisabeth Ekblom	5	0
(United States) Rona Daniels	3	2
(France) Frédérique Martin	6	6
(West Germany) Sabine Hack	3	3
3	(United States) Penny Barg	6	6

Second round
8	(West Germany) Andrea Betzner	1	1
(United States) Melissa Brown	6	6
(France) Frédérique Martin	0	1
3	(United States) Penny Barg	6	6

Qualifying competition
(United States) Melissa Brown	6	2	1
3	(United States) Penny Barg	4	6	6

=== Seventh qualifier ===
First round
5	(Czechoslovakia) Radka Zrubáková	6	6
(Mexico) Heliane Steden	1	2
(France) Nathalie Housset	6	6
(South Africa) Monica Reinach	1	2
(West Germany) Myriam Schropp	4	6	2
(Norway) Amy Jönsson Raaholt	6	4	6
(France) Corinne Vanier	4	0
16	(Netherlands) Marianne van der Torre	6	6

Second round
5	(Czechoslovakia) Radka Zrubáková	6	6
(France) Nathalie Housset	3	3
(Norway) Amy Jönsson Raaholt	1	6	3
16	(Netherlands) Marianne van der Torre	6	4	6

Qualifying competition
5	(Czechoslovakia) Radka Zrubáková	6	4	7
16	(Netherlands) Marianne van der Torre	4	6	5

=== Eighth qualifier ===
First round
14	(Czechoslovakia) Hana Fukárková	6	6
(Sweden) Catrin Jexell	2	0
(Sweden) Monica Lundqvist	6	6
(Italy) Laura Murgo	1	3
(Italy) Sabina Simmonds	6	6
(Czechoslovakia) Michaela Pazderová	3	1
(Netherlands) Simone Schilder	1	4
2	(Italy) Laura Golarsa	6	6

Second round
14	(Czechoslovakia) Hana Fukárková	6	6
(Sweden) Monica Lundqvist	1	4
(Italy) Sabina Simmonds	7^{7}	6
2	(Italy) Laura Golarsa	6^{4}	4

Qualifying competition
14	(Czechoslovakia) Hana Fukárková	6	6^{5}	8
(Italy) Sabina Simmonds	4	7^{7}	6
