= 1986 Athens Trophy – Doubles =

Doubles
- 1986 Athens Trophy

Final
- Champions: (West Germany) Isabel Cueto (Spain) Arantxa Sánchez Vicario
- Runners-up: (West Germany) Silke Meier (West Germany) Wiltrud Probst
- Score: 4–6, 6–2, 6–4

Details
- Draw: 13
- Seeds: 4

Events
Singles	Doubles
Athens Trophy	· 1987 →

In the first edition of the tournament, Isabel Cueto and Arantxa Sánchez Vicario won the title by defeating Silke Meier and Wiltrud Probst 4–6, 6–2, 6–4 in the final.

== Seeds ==
The first three seeds received a bye into the second round.

1. (Sweden) Anna-Karin Olsson / (Australia) Lisa O'Neill (semifinals)
2. (West Germany) Silke Meier / (West Germany) Wiltrud Probst (final)
3. (Brazil) Gisele Miró / (Argentina) Mariana Pérez Roldán (quarterfinals)
4. (Socialist Federal Republic of Yugoslavia) Mima Jaušovec / (Greece) Angeliki Kanellopoulou (first round)

== Draw ==
=== Key ===
- Q = Qualifier
- WC = Wild card
- LL = Lucky loser
- Alt = Alternate
- SE = Special exempt
- PR = Protected ranking
- ITF = ITF entry
- JE = Junior exempt
- w/o = Walkover
- r = Retired
- d = Defaulted
- SR = Special ranking

=== Draw ===
First round
(Greece) Alice Danila (West Germany) G Dinu	6	3
(Italy) L Jachia (Italy) S La Fratta	7	6
(West Germany) I Cueto (Spain) A Sánchez Vicario	6	6
(Switzerland) L Drescher (Greece) O Tsarbopoulou	1	2
(United States) J Golder (West Germany) S Hack	6	6
(United States) M Schillig (Australia) A Scott	1	1
(Australia) L Field (Australia) N Provis	6	6
4	(Socialist Federal Republic of Yugoslavia) M Jaušovec (Greece) A Kanellopoulou	2	0
(West Germany) C Lechner (Austria) B Pollet	4	6	6
(Czechoslovakia) M Pazderová (West Germany) R Tomanová	6	2	7

Quarterfinals
1	(Sweden) AK Olsson (Australia) L O'Neill	6	6
(Italy) L Jachia (Italy) S La Fratta	2	1
3	(Brazil) G Miró (Argentina) M Pérez Roldán	3	4
(West Germany) I Cueto (Spain) A Sánchez Vicario	6	6
(United States) J Golder (West Germany) S Hack	2	2
(Australia) L Field (Australia) N Provis	6	6
(Czechoslovakia) M Pazderová (West Germany) R Tomanová	6	3	2
2	(West Germany) S Meier (West Germany) W Probst	1	6	6

Semifinals
1	(Sweden) AK Olsson (Australia) L O'Neill	6	3	4
(West Germany) I Cueto (Spain) A Sánchez Vicario	3	6	6
(Australia) L Field (Australia) N Provis	6	1	5
2	(West Germany) S Meier (West Germany) W Probst	4	6	7

Final
(West Germany) I Cueto (Spain) A Sánchez Vicario	4	6	6
2	(West Germany) S Meier (West Germany) W Probst	6	2	4
