= 1985 French Open – Women's singles qualifying =

Women's singles qualifying
- 1985 French Open

Events
Singles	men	women		boys	girls
Doubles	men	women	mixed	boys	girls
WC Singles	men	women	quad
WC Doubles	men	women	quad
Legends	−45	45+	women
← 1984 ·	French Open	· 1986 →

Players who neither had high enough rankings nor received wild cards to enter the main draw of the annual French Open Tennis Championships participated in a qualifying tournament held in the week before the event.

== Seeds ==
1. (Czechoslovakia) Andrea Holíková (qualified)
2. (Japan) Emiko Okagawa (qualifying competition, lucky loser)
3. (Italy) Laura Garrone (qualified)
4. (West Germany) Isabel Cueto (qualified)
5. (Czechoslovakia) Lea Plchová (second round)
6. (Australia) Janine Thompson (qualified)
7. (United States) Kris Kinney (qualifying competition)
8. (Canada) Marianne Groat (first round)
9. (Hungary) Csilla Bartos-Cserepy (first round)
10. (United States) Kirsten Dreyer (first round)
11. (United States) Eileen Tell (qualified)
12. (Soviet Union) Natasha Reva (first round)
13. (United States) Penny Barg (qualified)
14. (Switzerland) Karin Stampfli (second round)
15. (Australia) Jenny Byrne (second round)
16. (Canada) Jill Hetherington (first round)

== Qualifiers ==
1. (Czechoslovakia) Andrea Holíková
2. (West Germany) Gabriela Dinu
3. (West Germany) Isabel Cueto
4. (United States) Laura Bernstein
5. (Australia) Janine Thompson
6. (Italy) Laura Garrone
7. (United States) Eileen Tell
8. (United States) Penny Barg

== Lucky losers ==
1. (Japan) Emiko Okagawa

== Qualifying draw ==
=== Key ===
- Q = Qualifier
- WC = Wild card
- LL = Lucky loser
- Alt = Alternate
- ITF = ITF entry
- PR = Protected ranking
- SR = Special ranking
- SE = Special exempt
- JE = Junior exempt
- JR = Junior Accelerator Programme entrant
- CO = College Accelerator Programme entrant
- NG = Next Gen Accelerator Program entrant
- w/o = Walkover
- r = Retired
- d = Defaulted

=== First qualifier ===
First round
1	(Czechoslovakia) Andrea Holíková	7^{8}	6
(France) Nathalie Housset	6^{6}	2
(United States) Stacy Margolin	2	2
(Brazil) Silvana Campos	6	6
(Italy) Laura Golarsa	6	7
(United States) Jane Forman	4	5
(South Africa) Elna Reinach	6	2	7^{7}
16	(Canada) Jill Hetherington	4	6	6^{5}

Second round
1	(Czechoslovakia) Andrea Holíková	6	4	6
(Brazil) Silvana Campos	0	6	0
(Italy) Laura Golarsa	2	6^{2}
(South Africa) Elna Reinach	6	7^{7}

Qualifying competition
1	(Czechoslovakia) Andrea Holíková	2	6	6
(South Africa) Elna Reinach	6	1	4

=== Second qualifier ===
First round
12	(Soviet Union) Natasha Reva	2	3
(West Germany) Gabriela Dinu	6	6
(France) Sybille Niox-Château	4	2
(West Germany) Renáta Tomanová	6	6
(Brazil) Luciana Corsato-Owsianka	2	6^{4}
(West Germany) Heidi Eisterlehner	6	7^{7}
(West Germany) Cornelia Lechner	6	4	3
7	(United States) Kris Kinney	3	6	6

Second round
(West Germany) Gabriela Dinu	6	6
(West Germany) Renáta Tomanová	4	2
(West Germany) Heidi Eisterlehner	1	2
7	(United States) Kris Kinney	6	6

Qualifying competition
(West Germany) Gabriela Dinu	6	6
7	(United States) Kris Kinney	3	1

=== Third qualifier ===
First round
4	(West Germany) Isabel Cueto	6	6
(Australia) Vicki Marler	2	2
(Sweden) Stina Almgren	6	3	7
(United States) Holly Danforth	2	6	5
(United States) Vicki Beggs	6	6
(Belgium) Kathleen Schuurmans	0	3
(United Kingdom) Sally Reeves	2	5
14	(Switzerland) Karin Stampfli	6	7

Second round
4	(West Germany) Isabel Cueto	6	6
(Sweden) Stina Almgren	2	0
(United States) Vicki Beggs	4	6	6
14	(Switzerland) Karin Stampfli	6	3	0

Qualifying competition
4	(West Germany) Isabel Cueto	7	3	6
(United States) Vicki Beggs	5	6	3

=== Fourth qualifier ===
First round
9	(Hungary) Csilla Bartos-Cserepy	0	6	5
(Czechoslovakia) Yvona Brzáková	6	4	7
(United States) Laura Bernstein	6	2	6
(France) Nathalie Phan-Thanh	3	6	4
(Australia) Pam Whytcross	6	4	3
(United States) Barbie Bramblett	3	6	6
(United States) Karin Huebner	5	6	4
5	(Czechoslovakia) Lea Plchová	7	3	6

Second round
(Czechoslovakia) Yvona Brzáková	4	6	4
(United States) Laura Bernstein	6	1	6
(United States) Barbie Bramblett	2	6	6
5	(Czechoslovakia) Lea Plchová	6	1	2

Qualifying competition
(United States) Laura Bernstein	6	7^{7}
(United States) Barbie Bramblett	3	6^{3}

=== Fifth qualifier ===
First round
6	(Australia) Janine Thompson	6	3	8
(Romania) Daniela Moise	4	6	6
(France) Hélène Cedet	6	6
(United States) Cheryl Jones	4	2
(Sweden) Helena Dahlström	7^{7}	1	2
(Czechoslovakia) Regina Maršíková	6^{5}	6	6
(France) Nathalie Ballet	4	4
15	(Australia) Jenny Byrne	6	6

Second round
6	(Australia) Janine Thompson	6	6
(France) Hélène Cedet	3	4
(Czechoslovakia) Regina Maršíková	6	6
15	(Australia) Jenny Byrne	1	3

Qualifying competition
6	(Australia) Janine Thompson	6	7
(Czechoslovakia) Regina Maršíková	2	5

=== Sixth qualifier ===
First round
10	(United States) Kirsten Dreyer	6	4	2
(Italy) Sabina Simmonds	4	6	6
(United States) Susan Rimes	6	7
(Sweden) Carin Anderholm	1	5
(Japan) Akiko Kijimuta	7^{7}	6
(Czechoslovakia) Hana Fukárková	6^{5}	3
(France) Brigitte Simon	2	3
3	(Italy) Laura Garrone	6	6

Second round
(Italy) Sabina Simmonds	6	7
(United States) Susan Rimes	4	5
(Japan) Akiko Kijimuta	3	1
3	(Italy) Laura Garrone	6	6

Qualifying competition
(Italy) Sabina Simmonds	6	1	1
3	(Italy) Laura Garrone	4	6	6

=== Seventh qualifier ===
First round
8	(Canada) Marianne Groat	5	6	2
(Greece) Olga Tsarbopoulou	7	4	6
(Australia) Michelle Turk	6	6
(Japan) Naoko Sato	3	1
(France) Alexia Dechaume-Balleret	6	2	5
(Hong Kong) Patricia Hy	0	6	7
(Australia) Rebecca Bryant	4	4
11	(United States) Eileen Tell	6	6

Second round
(Greece) Olga Tsarbopoulou	6	6
(Australia) Michelle Turk	1	2
(Hong Kong) Patricia Hy	6	6^{2}	2
11	(United States) Eileen Tell	0	7^{7}	6

Qualifying competition
(Greece) Olga Tsarbopoulou	5	6	4
11	(United States) Eileen Tell	7	0	6

=== Eighth qualifier ===
First round
13	(United States) Penny Barg	6	6
(Australia) Annette Gulley	2	1
(Australia) Colleen Carney	3	6	3
(Japan) Kumiko Okamoto	6	3	6
(France) Lydie Vanhille	5	2
(Sweden) Helena Olsson	7	6
(France) Isabelle Vernhes	4	2
2	(Japan) Emiko Okagawa	6	6

Second round
13	(United States) Penny Barg	6	7
(Japan) Kumiko Okamoto	2	5
(Sweden) Helena Olsson	4	1
2	(Japan) Emiko Okagawa	6	6

Qualifying competition
13	(United States) Penny Barg	6	6
2	(Japan) Emiko Okagawa	2	4
