= 1986 Wimbledon Championships – Girls' doubles =

Girls' doubles
- 1986 Wimbledon Championships

Final
- Champions: (Australia) Michelle Jaggard (Australia) Lisa O'Neill
- Runners-up: (Soviet Union) Leila Meskhi (Soviet Union) Natasha Zvereva
- Score: 7–6^{(7–3)}, 6–7^{(4–7)}, 6–4

Events
Singles	men	women		boys	girls
Doubles	men	women	mixed	boys	girls
WC Singles	men	women	quad
WC Doubles	men	women	quad
Legends	men	women	seniors
← 1985 ·	Wimbledon Championships	· 1987 →

Michelle Jaggard and Lisa O'Neill defeated Leila Meskhi and Natasha Zvereva in the final, 7–6^{(7–3)}, 6–7^{(4–7)}, 6–4 to win the girls' doubles tennis title at the 1986 Wimbledon Championships.

== Seeds ==
The top 3 seeds received a bye into the second round.

1. (France) Alexia Dechaume / (France) Sybille Niox-Château (quarterfinals)
2. (Brazil) Gisele Miró / (Argentina) Patricia Tarabini (quarterfinals)
3. (South Korea) Kim Il-soon / (Philippines) Jennifer Saberon (semifinals)
4. (Brazil) Gisele Faria / (France) Frédérique Martin (quarterfinals)
5. (West Germany) Wiltrud Probst / (West Germany) Eva-Maria Schürhoff (semifinals)
6. (Soviet Union) Leila Meskhi / (Soviet Union) Natasha Zvereva (final)
7. (Australia) Karen Deed / (Australia) Nicole Provis (second round)
8. (Australia) Michelle Jaggard / (Australia) Lisa O'Neill (champions)

== Draw ==
=== Key ===
- Q = Qualifier
- WC = Wild card
- LL = Lucky loser
- Alt = Alternate
- SE = Special exempt
- PR = Protected ranking
- ITF = ITF entry
- JE = Junior exempt
- w/o = Walkover
- r = Retired
- d = Defaulted
- SR = Special ranking

=== Finals ===
Semifinals
5	(West Germany) Wiltrud Probst (West Germany) Eva-Maria Schürhoff	0	3
8	(Australia) Michelle Jaggard (Australia) Lisa O'Neill	6	6
3	(South Korea) Kim Il-soon (Philippines) Jennifer Saberon	3	1
6	(Soviet Union) Leila Meskhi (Soviet Union) Natasha Zvereva	6	6

Final
8	(Australia) Michelle Jaggard (Australia) Lisa O'Neill	7^{7}	6^{4}	6
6	(Soviet Union) Leila Meskhi (Soviet Union) Natasha Zvereva	6^{3}	7^{7}	4

=== Top half ===
First round
(United Kingdom) Sally Godman (United Kingdom) Sarah Loosemore	w/o
(South Africa) Gail Boon (Republic of Ireland) Lisa Pamintuan
(France) Cécile Calmette (Hungary) Ildikó Guba	6	6
(Finland) Sarianna Ansio (Finland) Petra Thorén	2	3
(Chile) Natalie Rodríguez (Chile) Pauline Rodríguez	2	3
5	(West Germany) Wiltrud Probst (West Germany) Eva-Maria Schürhoff	6	6
4	(Brazil) Gisele Faria (France) Frédérique Martin	6	6
(Belgium) Ann Devries (Hong Kong) Paulette Moreno	3	4
(Argentina) Bettina Fulco (Argentina) Gabriela Mosca	6	6
(Poland) Sylwia Czopek (Poland) Katarzyna Nowak	3	2
(Czechoslovakia) Jana Novotná (Czechoslovakia) Radka Zrubáková	6	6
(United Kingdom) Katie Rickett (United Kingdom) Sally Timms	1	2
(Bulgaria) Elena Pampoulova (Japan) Ryoko Yamaguchi	1	3
8	(Australia) Michelle Jaggard (Australia) Lisa O'Neill	6	6

Second round
1	(France) Alexia Dechaume (France) Sybille Niox-Château	6	6
(South Africa) G Boon (Republic of Ireland) L Pamintuan	3	3
(France) C Calmette (Hungary) I Guba	6^{5}	0
5	(West Germany) W Probst (West Germany) E-M Schürhoff	7^{7}	6
4	(Brazil) G Faria (France) F Martin	6	6
(Argentina) B Fulco (Argentina) G Mosca	2	2
(Czechoslovakia) J Novotná (Czechoslovakia) R Zrubáková	3	1
8	(Australia) M Jaggard (Australia) L O'Neill	6	6

Quarterfinals
1	(France) A Dechaume (France) S Niox-Château	4	3
5	(West Germany) W Probst (West Germany) E-M Schürhoff	6	6
4	(Brazil) G Faria (France) F Martin	3	3
8	(Australia) M Jaggard (Australia) L O'Neill	6	6

Semifinals
5	(West Germany) W Probst (West Germany) E-M Schürhoff	0	3
8	(Australia) M Jaggard (Australia) L O'Neill	6	6

=== Bottom half ===
First round
7	(Australia) Karen Deed (Australia) Nicole Provis	6	6
(Japan) Ayako Hirose (Japan) Yoriko Yamagishi	2	3
(Philippines) Nina Castillejo (India) Shaheen Zaman	2	1
(United States) Shannan McCarthy (United Kingdom) Anne Simpkin	6	6
(Jamaica) Hentietta Harris (Thailand) Sakorwan Karcharoen	2	2
(United Kingdom) Alison Fleming (United Kingdom) Amanda Gregory	6	6
6	(Soviet Union) Leila Meskhi (Soviet Union) Natasha Zvereva	7	6
(Brazil) Cláudia Chabalgoity (Brazil) Luciana Tella	5	0
(United Kingdom) Teresa Catlin (United Kingdom) Clare Wood	6	7
(Switzerland) Sandrine Jaquet (Socialist Federal Republic of Yugoslavia) Aila Winkler	4	5
(South Africa) Linda Barnard (South Africa) Paulette Roux	7	6
(United Kingdom) Valda Lake (United Kingdom) Jane Wood	6	1

Second round
7	(Australia) K Deed (Australia) N Provis	3	6^{5}
(United States) S McCarthy (United Kingdom) A Simpkin	6	7^{7}
(United Kingdom) A Fleming (United Kingdom) A Gregory	4	0
3	(South Korea) Kim Il-soon (Philippines) Jennifer Saberon	6	6
6	(Soviet Union) L Meskhi (Soviet Union) N Zvereva	7	6
(United Kingdom) T Catlin (United Kingdom) C Wood	5	4
(South Africa) L Barnard (South Africa) P Roux	3	6	5
2	(Brazil) Gisele Miró (Argentina) Patricia Tarabini	6	3	7

Quarterfinals
(United States) S McCarthy (United Kingdom) A Simpkin	4	4
3	(South Korea) I-s Kim (Philippines) J Saberon	6	6
6	(Soviet Union) L Meskhi (Soviet Union) N Zvereva	6	6
(Brazil) G Miró (Argentina) P Tarabini	4	3

Semifinals
3	(South Korea) I-s Kim (Philippines) J Saberon	3	1
6	(Soviet Union) L Meskhi (Soviet Union) N Zvereva	6	6
