= 1986 Athens Trophy – Singles =

Singles
- 1986 Athens Trophy

Final
- Champion: (West Germany) Sylvia Hanika
- Runner-up: (Greece) Angeliki Kanellopoulou
- Score: 7–5, 6–1

Details
- Draw: 32 (4Q/1LL)
- Seeds: 8

Events
Singles	Doubles
Athens Trophy	· 1987 →

In the first edition of the tournament, Sylvia Hanika won the title by defeating Angeliki Kanellopoulou 7–5, 6–1 in the final.

== Seeds ==
1. (Italy) Laura Garrone (semifinals)
2. (Italy) Sandra Cecchini (second round)
3. (Greece) Angeliki Kanellopoulou (final)
4. (Switzerland) Lilian Drescher (quarterfinals)
5. (West Germany) Sylvia Hanika (champion)
6. (Argentina) Mariana Pérez Roldán (semifinals)
7. (Switzerland) Csilla Bartos-Cserepy (second round)
8. (West Germany) Isabel Cueto (quarterfinals)

== Draw ==
=== Key ===
- Q = Qualifier
- WC = Wild card
- LL = Lucky loser
- Alt = Alternate
- SE = Special exempt
- PR = Protected ranking
- ITF = ITF entry
- JE = Junior exempt
- w/o = Walkover
- r = Retired
- d = Defaulted
- SR = Special ranking

=== Finals ===
Semifinals
1	(Italy) Laura Garrone	6	6	1
3	(Greece) Angeliki Kanellopoulou	4	7	6
5	(West Germany) Sylvia Hanika	6	6
6	(Argentina) Mariana Pérez Roldán	4	3

Final
3	(Greece) Angeliki Kanellopoulou	5	1
5	(West Germany) Sylvia Hanika	7	6

=== Top half ===
First round
1	(Italy) L Garrone	3	6	6
Q	(West Germany) S Hack	6	4	0
LL	(Australia) L O'Neill	6	6
(United States) M Schillig	2	1
(Spain) A Sánchez Vicario	6	6
(West Germany) S Meier	4	4
(Socialist Federal Republic of Yugoslavia) M Jaušovec	2	6	0
6	(West Germany) I Cueto	6	4	6
3	(Greece) A Kanellopoulou	6	4	6
(Australia) N Provis	4	6	4
Q	(Czechoslovakia) R Tomanová	3	1
(Italy) L Jachia	6	6
(Austria) J Pölzl	5	6	6
(West Germany) P Keppeler	7	3	2
Q	(United States) J Golder	4	3
7	(Switzerland) C Bartos-Cserepy	6	6

Second round
1	(Italy) L Garrone	6	6
LL	(Australia) L O'Neill	2	1
(Spain) A Sánchez Vicario	2	2
6	(West Germany) I Cueto	6	6
3	(Greece) A Kanellopoulou	6	6	6
(Italy) L Jachia	7	2	2
(Austria) J Pölzl	6	6
7	(Switzerland) C Bartos-Cserepy	1	1

Quarterfinals
1	(Italy) L Garrone	6	6
6	(West Germany) I Cueto	2	4
3	(Greece) A Kanellopoulou	6	4	6
(Austria) J Pölzl	2	6	2

Semifinals
1	(Italy) L Garrone	6	6	1
3	(Greece) A Kanellopoulou	4	7	6

=== Bottom half ===
First round
5	(West Germany) S Hanika	7	6
(West Germany) W Probst	6	2
(Sweden) H Dahlström	4	3
(West Germany) G Dinu	6	6
(West Germany) C Singer	6	0	6
Q	(Italy) S La Fratta	2	6	4
(Greece) O Tsarbopoulou	2	2
4	(Switzerland) L Drescher	6	6
6	(Argentina) M Pérez Roldán	7	6
(Australia) L Field	5	1
(Austria) B Pollet	2	6	6
(Sweden) M Lundqvist	6	2	3
(Netherlands) H ter Riet	1	4
(Italy) F Bonsignori	6	6
(Greece) Xenia Anastasiados	2	1
2	(Italy) S Cecchini	6	6

Second round
5	(West Germany) S Hanika	6	6
(West Germany) G Dinu	1	2
(West Germany) C Singer	5	2
4	(Switzerland) L Drescher	7	6
6	(Argentina) M Pérez Roldán	3	6	7
(Austria) B Pollet	6	4	6
(Italy) F Bonsignori	6	7
2	(Italy) S Cecchini	3	6

Quarterfinals
5	(West Germany) S Hanika	6	6
4	(Switzerland) L Drescher	0	2
6	(Argentina) M Pérez Roldán	6	5	7
(Italy) F Bonsignori	2	7	6

Semifinals
5	(West Germany) S Hanika	6	6
6	(Argentina) M Pérez Roldán	4	3
