= 1989 Athens Trophy – Singles =

Singles
- 1989 Athens Trophy

Final
- Champion: (Sweden) Cecilia Dahlman
- Runner-up: (Australia) Rachel McQuillan
- Score: 6–3, 1–6, 7–5

Details
- Draw: 32 (4Q)
- Seeds: 8

Events
Singles	Doubles
← 1988 ·	Athens Trophy	· 1990 →

Isabel Cueto was the defending champion, but lost in the first round to Federica Bonsignori.

Cecilia Dahlman won the title by defeating Rachel McQuillan 6–3, 1–6, 7–5 in the final.

== Seeds ==
1. (West Germany) Isabel Cueto (first round)
2. (Italy) Sandra Cecchini (quarterfinals)
3. (Argentina) Bettina Fulco (second round)
4. (West Germany) Sabine Hack (first round)
5. (Argentina) Patricia Tarabini (first round)
6. (Greece) Angeliki Kanellopoulou (quarterfinals)
7. (Brazil) Andrea Vieira (second round)
8. (Italy) Laura Garrone (semifinals)

== Draw ==
=== Key ===
- Q = Qualifier
- WC = Wild card
- LL = Lucky loser
- Alt = Alternate
- SE = Special exempt
- PR = Protected ranking
- ITF = ITF entry
- JE = Junior exempt
- w/o = Walkover
- r = Retired
- d = Defaulted
- SR = Special ranking

=== Finals ===
Semifinals
(Sweden) Cecilia Dahlman	6	6
8	(Italy) Laura Garrone	4	2
Q	(Italy) Francesca Romano	1	2
(Australia) Rachel McQuillan	6	6

Final
(Sweden) Cecilia Dahlman	6	1	7
(Australia) Rachel McQuillan	3	6	5

=== Top half ===
First round
1	(West Germany) I Cueto	1	6	4
(Italy) F Bonsignori	6	3	6
(Sweden) C Dahlman	6	6
Q	(Switzerland) E Zardo	3	0
Q	(Netherlands) H ter Riet	6	3	6
(West Germany) S Meier	2	6	7
(Italy) B Romanò	6	6
5	(Argentina) P Tarabini	0	1
3	(Argentina) B Fulco	4	7	7
(Australia) M Jaggard	6	5	5
(Czechoslovakia) I Budařová	3	6	7
(Greece) C Papadáki	6	1	6
(France) J Halard	6	6
Q	(Poland) K Nowak	3	2
(Austria) P Ritter	6	2	3
8	(Italy) L Garrone	3	6	6

Second round
(Italy) F Bonsignori	5	3
(Sweden) C Dahlman	7	6
(West Germany) S Meier	7	2	3
(Italy) B Romanò	5	6	6
3	(Argentina) B Fulco	3	4
(Czechoslovakia) I Budařová	6	6
(France) J Halard	6	6	4
8	(Italy) L Garrone	7	4	6

Quarterfinals
(Sweden) C Dahlman	6	2	7
(Italy) B Romanò	4	6	6
(Czechoslovakia) I Budařová	4	1
8	(Italy) L Garrone	6	6

Semifinals
(Sweden) C Dahlman	6	6
8	(Italy) L Garrone	4	2

=== Bottom half ===
First round
6	(Greece) A Kanellopoulou	6	6
(Luxembourg) K Kschwendt	0	2
(West Germany) M Pawlik	6	6
(Belgium) S Appelmans	3	4
(Greece) O Tsarbopoulou	3	2
Q	(Italy) F Romano	6	6
(Switzerland) C Cohen	6	6
4	(West Germany) S Hack	3	4
7	(Brazil) A Vieira	6	0
(Denmark) T Scheuer-Larsen	2	2^{r}
(Socialist Federal Republic of Yugoslavia) S Goleš	6	4
(Australia) R McQuillan	7	6
(Czechoslovakia) E Švíglerová	1	3
(Bulgaria) E Pampoulova	6	6
(West Germany) V Martinek	6	1
2	(Italy) S Cecchini	7	6

Second round
6	(Greece) A Kanellopoulou	4	6	6
(West Germany) M Pawlik	6	3	4
Q	(Italy) F Romano	6	6
(Switzerland) C Cohen	3	1
7	(Brazil) A Vieira	4	4
(Australia) R McQuillan	6	6
(Bulgaria) E Pampoulova	3	1
2	(Italy) S Cecchini	6	6

Quarterfinals
6	(Greece) A Kanellopoulou	6	7	2
Q	(Italy) F Romano	7	6	6
(Australia) R McQuillan	6	6
2	(Italy) S Cecchini	3	4

Semifinals
Q	(Italy) F Romano	1	2
(Australia) R McQuillan	6	6
