= 1985 US Open – Women's singles qualifying =

Women's singles qualifying
- 1985 US Open

Events
Singles	men	women		boys	girls
Doubles	men	women	mixed	boys	girls
WC Singles	men	women	quad
WC Doubles	men	women	quad
Legends	men	women	mixed

Qualification
Singles	men	women
- US Open

Players who neither had high enough rankings nor received wild cards to enter the main draw of the annual US Open Tennis Championships participated in a qualifying tournament held over several days before the event.

== Seeds ==
1. (United States) Kris Kinney (first round)
2. (Japan) Masako Yanagi (second round)
3. (United States) Tina Mochizuki (second round)
4. (France) Marie-Christine Calleja (first round)
5. (Czechoslovakia) Lea Plchová (first round)
6. (France) Corinne Vanier (second round)
7. (United States) Penny Barg (second round)
8. (Italy) Caterina Nozzoli (first round)
9. (United States) Linda Howell (first round)
10. (United States) Heather Ludloff (second round)
11. (United States) Candy Reynolds (first round)
12. (United States) Kathleen Cummings (second round)
13. (Australia) Jenny Byrne (first round)
14. (United States) Jennifer Mundel (qualifying competition, lucky loser)
15. (France) Nathalie Herreman (first round)
16. (Peru) Pilar Vásquez (qualifying competition)

== Qualifiers ==
1. (Canada) Jane Young
2. (United States) Barbara Jordan
3. (United States) Susan Sloane
4. (United States) Marianne Werdel
5. (United States) Caroline Kuhlman
6. (Sweden) Maria Lindström
7. (United States) Anna-Maria Fernandez
8. (United States) Eleni Rossides

== Lucky losers ==
1. (United States) Jennifer Mundel

== Qualifying draw ==
Key

- Q = Qualifier
- WC = Wild card
- LL = Lucky loser
- Alt = Alternate
- ITF = ITF entry
- PR = Protected ranking
- SR = Special ranking
- SE = Special exempt
- JE = Junior exempt
- JR = Junior Accelerator Programme entrant
- CO = College Accelerator Programme entrant
- NG = Next Gen Accelerator Program entrant
- w/o = Walkover
- r = Retired
- d = Defaulted

=== First qualifier ===
First round
1	(United States) Kris Kinney	3	7^{7}	3
(Canada) Jane Young	6	6^{4}	6
(Sweden) Carin Anderholm	0	6	4
(United States) Eileen Tell	6	3	6
(Italy) Laura Golarsa	6	4	3
(New Zealand) Julie Richardson	1	6	6
(United States) Caryn Copeland	6	7^{7}
9	(United States) Linda Howell	2	6^{3}

Second round
(Canada) Jane Young	7	7^{7}
(United States) Eileen Tell	5	6^{4}
(New Zealand) Julie Richardson	2	2
(United States) Caryn Copeland	6	6

Qualifying competition
(Canada) Jane Young	6	6
(United States) Caryn Copeland	1	2

=== Second qualifier ===
First round
14	(United States) Jennifer Mundel	6	6
(West Germany) Renáta Tomanová	0	4
(United States) Kim Steinmetz	1	4
(United Kingdom) Rina Einy	6	6
(United States) Trey Lewis	3	2
(United States) Barbara Jordan	6	6
(United States) Heather Crowe	7^{7}	4	0
6	(France) Corinne Vanier	6^{2}	6	6

Second round
14	(United States) Jennifer Mundel	7	6
(United Kingdom) Rina Einy	5	3
(United States) Barbara Jordan	6	6
6	(France) Corinne Vanier	2	3

Qualifying competition
14	(United States) Jennifer Mundel	5	4
(United States) Barbara Jordan	7	6

=== Third qualifier ===
First round
4	(France) Marie-Christine Calleja	3	2
(United States) Maeve Quinlan	6	6
(United States) Susan Sloane	6	6
(Canada) Jill Hetherington	1	1
(Italy) Sabina Simmonds	6	6^{4}	6
(Canada) Hélène Pelletier	3	7^{7}	0
(United States) Jamie Golder	6	4	4
16	(Peru) Pilar Vásquez	2	6	6

Second round
(United States) Maeve Quinlan	2	4
(United States) Susan Sloane	6	6
(Italy) Sabina Simmonds	6^{3}	5
16	(Peru) Pilar Vásquez	7^{7}	7

Qualifying competition
(United States) Susan Sloane	6	6
16	(Peru) Pilar Vásquez	1	4

=== Fourth qualifier ===
First round
11	(United States) Candy Reynolds	6	6^{4}	4
(Australia) Pam Whytcross	3	7^{7}	6
(Canada) Marianne Groat	6	3	4
(United States) Louise Allen	2	6	6
(United States) Ronni Reis	4	3
(Italy) Federica Bonsignori	6	6
(United States) Marianne Werdel	4	6	6
8	(Italy) Caterina Nozzoli	6	2	4

Second round
(Australia) Pam Whytcross	6	6
(United States) Louise Allen	3	3
(Italy) Federica Bonsignori	4	6	1
(United States) Marianne Werdel	6	3	6

Qualifying competition
(Australia) Pam Whytcross	6^{4}	5
(United States) Marianne Werdel	7^{7}	7

=== Fifth qualifier ===
First round
7	(United States) Penny Barg	6	5	6
(Sweden) Catrin Jexell	3	7	1
(United States) Kirsten Dreyer	3	2
(United States) Caroline Kuhlman	6	6
(Canada) Karen Dewis	4	6	6
(United States) Kim Sands	6	3	1
(United States) Laura Bernstein	6^{4}	6	7
15	(France) Nathalie Herreman	7^{7}	1	5

Second round
7	(United States) Penny Barg	4	4
(United States) Caroline Kuhlman	6	6
(Canada) Karen Dewis	4	2
(United States) Laura Bernstein	6	6

Qualifying competition
(United States) Caroline Kuhlman	6	6
(United States) Laura Bernstein	4	3

=== Sixth qualifier ===
First round
10	(United States) Heather Ludloff	4	6	6
(Japan) Kumiko Okamoto	6	1	3
(United States) Barbie Bramblett	6	6
(United States) Paula Smith	2	3
(Sweden) Maria Lindström	6	6
(Australia) Colleen Carney	2	2
(United States) Kyle Copeland	1	1
3	(United States) Tina Mochizuki	6	6

Second round
10	(United States) Heather Ludloff	3	4
(United States) Barbie Bramblett	6	6
(Sweden) Maria Lindström	2	6	6
3	(United States) Tina Mochizuki	6	2	3

Qualifying competition
(United States) Barbie Bramblett	3	1
(Sweden) Maria Lindström	6	6

=== Seventh qualifier ===
First round
5	(Czechoslovakia) Lea Plchová	3	4
(United States) Anna-Maria Fernandez	6	6
(United States) Jane Forman	5	6^{3}
(United States) Renee Blount	7	7^{7}
(United States) Cecilia Fernandez-Parker	6	6
(Sweden) Elisabeth Ekblom	4	0
(France) Nathalie Tauziat	6	6
13	(Australia) Jenny Byrne	3	0

Second round
(United States) Anna-Maria Fernandez	6	6
(United States) Renee Blount	3	4
(United States) Cecilia Fernandez-Parker	5	4
(France) Nathalie Tauziat	7	6

Qualifying competition
(United States) Anna-Maria Fernandez	6	6
(France) Nathalie Tauziat	4	4

=== Eighth qualifier ===
First round
12	(United States) Kathleen Cummings	6	6
(Hungary) Csilla Bartos-Cserepy	4	1
(United States) Chris Gillis	6	2	3
(United States) Susan Rimes	3	6	6
(United States) Eleni Rossides	6	7^{7}
(Sweden) Karolina Karlsson	3	6^{3}
(Japan) Emiko Okagawa	7	4	5
2	(Japan) Masako Yanagi	5	6	7

Second round
12	(United States) Kathleen Cummings	7	4	6^{6}
(United States) Susan Rimes	5	6	7^{8}
(United States) Eleni Rossides	7^{8}	6
2	(Japan) Masako Yanagi	6^{6}	2

Qualifying competition
(United States) Susan Rimes	3	6^{3}
(United States) Eleni Rossides	6	7^{7}
