= 1989 Athens Trophy – Doubles =

Doubles
- 1989 Athens Trophy

Final
- Champions: (Italy) Sandra Cecchini (Argentina) Patricia Tarabini
- Runners-up: (West Germany) Silke Meier (Bulgaria) Elena Pampoulova
- Score: 4–6, 6–4, 6–2

Details
- Draw: 16
- Seeds: 4

Events
Singles	Doubles
← 1988 ·	Athens Trophy	· 1990 →

Sabrina Goleš and Judith Wiesner were the defending champions, but none competed this year. Goleš chose to focus on the singles tournament only.

Sandra Cecchini and Patricia Tarabini won the title by defeating Silke Meier and Elena Pampoulova 4–6, 6–4, 6–2 in the final.

== Seeds ==
1. (Italy) Sandra Cecchini / (Argentina) Patricia Tarabini (champions)
2. (n/a)
3. (Sweden) Cecilia Dahlman / (Netherlands) Simone Schilder (first round)
4. (Australia) Rachel McQuillan / (Australia) Rennae Stubbs (first round)

== Draw ==
=== Key ===
- Q = Qualifier
- WC = Wild card
- LL = Lucky loser
- Alt = Alternate
- SE = Special exempt
- PR = Protected ranking
- ITF = ITF entry
- JE = Junior exempt
- w/o = Walkover
- r = Retired
- d = Defaulted
- SR = Special ranking

=== Draw ===
First round
1	(Italy) S Cecchini (Argentina) P Tarabini	6	6
(France) J Halard (Greece) A Kanellopoulou	2	2
(Argentina) B Fulco (Australia) M Jaggard	0	5
(Czechoslovakia) I Budařová (Czechoslovakia) E Švíglerová	6	7
4	(Australia) R McQuillan (Australia) R Stubbs	6	1
(Italy) M Grossi (West Germany) M Pawlik	7	6
(Luxembourg) K Kschwendt (Greece) O Tsarbopoulou	6	2	0
(Czechoslovakia) D Krajčovičová (Czechoslovakia) A Noháčová	3	6	6
(Australia) T Morton (Austria) H Sprung	6	2	2
(Finland) A Aallonen (Italy) B Romanò	2	6	6
(West Germany) S Hack (Brazil) A Vieira	6	3	7
3	(Sweden) C Dahlman (Netherlands) S Schilder	2	6	6
(Italy) Nicoletta Iaccarino (Netherlands) H ter Riet	6	6
(Italy) F Bonsignori (Poland) K Nowak	3	4
(West Germany) S Meier (Bulgaria) E Pampoulova	6	6
(West Germany) V Martinek (Italy) K Piccolini	4	2

Quarterfinals
1	(Italy) S Cecchini (Argentina) P Tarabini	6	6
(Czechoslovakia) I Budařová (Czechoslovakia) E Švíglerová	2	1
(Italy) M Grossi (West Germany) M Pawlik	4	6	6
(Czechoslovakia) D Krajčovičová (Czechoslovakia) A Noháčová	6	3	2
(Finland) A Aallonen (Italy) B Romanò	6	6
(West Germany) S Hack (Brazil) A Vieira	4	3
(Italy) N Iaccarino (Netherlands) H ter Riet	7	4	4
(West Germany) S Meier (Bulgaria) E Pampoulova	5	6	6

Semifinals
1	(Italy) S Cecchini (Argentina) P Tarabini	6	7
(Italy) M Grossi (West Germany) M Pawlik	4	5
(Finland) A Aallonen (Italy) B Romanò	1	0
(West Germany) S Meier (Bulgaria) E Pampoulova	6	6

Final
1	(Italy) S Cecchini (Argentina) P Tarabini	4	6	6
(West Germany) S Meier (Bulgaria) E Pampoulova	6	4	2
