= 1990 Athens Trophy – Doubles =

Doubles
- 1990 Athens Trophy

Final
- Champions: (Italy) Laura Garrone (Luxembourg) Karin Kschwendt
- Runners-up: (Czechoslovakia) Leona Lásková (Czechoslovakia) Jana Pospíšilová
- Score: 6–0, 1–6, 7–6^{(8–6)}

Events
Singles	Doubles
← 1989 ·	Athens Trophy

Sandra Cecchini and Patricia Tarabini were the defending champions, but the pair decided to compete at Kitzbühel in the same week, losing in the final.

Laura Garrone and Karin Kschwendt won the title by defeating Leona Lásková and Jana Pospíšilová 6–0, 1–6, 7–6^{(8–6)} in the final.

== Seeds ==
1. (Italy) Laura Garrone / (Luxembourg) Karin Kschwendt (champions)
2. (Australia) Jo-Anne Faull / (Australia) Tracey Morton (first round)
3. (Czechoslovakia) Leona Lásková / (Czechoslovakia) Jana Pospíšilová (final)
4. (Denmark) Sofie Albinus / (United Kingdom) Samantha Smith (first round)

== Draw ==
=== Key ===
- Q = Qualifier
- WC = Wild card
- LL = Lucky loser
- Alt = Alternate
- SE = Special exempt
- PR = Protected ranking
- ITF = ITF entry
- JE = Junior exempt
- w/o = Walkover
- r = Retired
- d = Defaulted
- SR = Special ranking

=== Draw ===
First round
1	(Italy) L Garrone (Luxembourg) K Kschwendt	6	6
(Hungary) C Bartos (Switzerland) E Zardo	4	1
(Socialist Federal Republic of Yugoslavia) S Goleš (Greece) A Kanellopoulou	7^{7}	6
(West Germany) A Kerek (Czechoslovakia) Ivona Matulíková	6^{4}	3
4	(Denmark) S Albinus (United Kingdom) S Smith	2	4
(Australia) K Godridge (Australia) K Sharpe	6	6
(Argentina) F Haumüller (Bulgaria) E Pampoulova	6^{4}	2
(United States) A Gooden (Soviet Union) J Salnikova	7^{7}	6
(West Germany) EM Schürhoff (Greece) O Tsarbopoulou	3	6	0
(Sweden) C Dahlman (Finland) N Dahlman	6	3	6
(Greece) Marisa Georgitsi (Greece) C Papadáki	1	1
3	(Czechoslovakia) L Lásková (Czechoslovakia) J Pospíšilová	6	6
(Italy) S Isidori (Italy) B Romanò	6	5	3
(Soviet Union) A Blumberga (Finland) P Thorén	2	7	6
(Spain) MJ Llorca (Australia) L Pleming	7^{7}	7
2	(Australia) JA Faull (Australia) T Morton	6^{5}	5

Quarterfinals
1	(Italy) L Garrone (Luxembourg) K Kschwendt	5	6	6
(Socialist Federal Republic of Yugoslavia) S Goleš (Greece) A Kanellopoulou	7	4	1
(Australia) K Godridge (Australia) K Sharpe	6	7^{9}
(United States) A Gooden (Soviet Union) J Salnikova	2	6^{7}
(Sweden) C Dahlman (Finland) N Dahlman	3	3
3	(Czechoslovakia) L Lásková (Czechoslovakia) J Pospíšilová	6	6
(Soviet Union) A Blumberga (Finland) P Thorén	7^{7}	6
(Spain) MJ Llorca (Australia) L Pleming	6^{4}	2

Semifinals
1	(Italy) L Garrone (Luxembourg) K Kschwendt	7^{7}	2	7^{7}
(Australia) K Godridge (Australia) K Sharpe	6^{3}	6	6^{4}
3	(Czechoslovakia) L Lásková (Czechoslovakia) J Pospíšilová	2	6	6
(Soviet Union) A Blumberga (Finland) P Thorén	6	1	4

Final
1	(Italy) L Garrone (Luxembourg) K Kschwendt	6	1	7^{8}
3	(Czechoslovakia) L Lásková (Czechoslovakia) J Pospíšilová	0	6	6^{6}
