= 1990 Athens Trophy – Singles =

Singles
- 1990 Athens Trophy

Final
- Champion: (Sweden) Cecilia Dahlman
- Runner-up: (Italy) Katia Piccolini
- Score: 7–5, 7–5

Details
- Draw: 32 (1WC/4Q/1LL)
- Seeds: 8

Events
Singles	Doubles
← 1989 ·	Athens Trophy

Cecilia Dahlman successfully defended her title, by defeating Katia Piccolini 7–5, 7–5 in the final.

== Seeds ==
1. (West Germany) Sabine Hack (quarterfinals)
2. (Italy) Laura Garrone (first round)
3. (Switzerland) Emanuela Zardo (quarterfinals)
4. (Sweden) Cecilia Dahlman (champion)
5. (Bulgaria) Elena Pampoulova (second round)
6. (Italy) Federica Bonsignori (semifinals)
7. (Italy) Katia Piccolini (final)
8. (Hungary) Csilia Bartos (second round)

== Draw ==
=== Key ===
- Q = Qualifier
- WC = Wild card
- LL = Lucky loser
- Alt = Alternate
- SE = Special exempt
- PR = Protected ranking
- ITF = ITF entry
- JE = Junior exempt
- w/o = Walkover
- r = Retired
- d = Defaulted
- SR = Special ranking

=== Finals ===
Semifinals
6	(Italy) Federica Bonsignori	2	3
7	(Italy) Katia Piccolini	6	6
4	(Sweden) Cecilia Dahlman	6	3	6
(France) Mary Pierce	4	6	4

Final
7	(Italy) Katia Piccolini	5	5
4	(Sweden) Cecilia Dahlman	7	7

=== Top half ===
First round
1	(West Germany) S Hack	6	6
(Australia) K Sharpe	3	3
(Socialist Federal Republic of Yugoslavia) S Goleš	3	2
(West Germany) S Frankl	6	6
(Czechoslovakia) L Lásková	6	4	1
(Italy) B Romanò	1	6	6
(Australia) K Godridge	0	7^{10}	0
6	(Italy) F Bonsignori	6	6^{8}	6
3	(Switzerland) E Zardo	6	6
(Greece) A Kanellopoulou	1	3
Q	(Soviet Union) J Salnikova	6	7^{7}
WC	(Greece) O Tsarbopoulou	2	6^{4}
(Czechoslovakia) J Pospíšilová	6	6
Q	(Poland) K Nowak	2	3
(Finland) N Dahlman	0	6^{8}
7	(Italy) K Piccolini	6	7^{10}

Second round
1	(West Germany) S Hack	2	6	6
(West Germany) S Frankl	6	3	3
(Italy) B Romanò	6^{4}	4
6	(Italy) F Bonsignori	7^{7}	6
3	(Switzerland) E Zardo	6	6
Q	(Soviet Union) J Salnikova	3	0
(Czechoslovakia) J Pospíšilová	4	4
7	(Italy) K Piccolini	6	6

Quarterfinals
1	(West Germany) S Hack	3	6	6^{5}
6	(Italy) F Bonsignori	6	3	7^{7}
3	(Switzerland) E Zardo	7^{7}	6^{4}	0
7	(Italy) K Piccolini	6^{3}	7^{7}	6

Semifinals
6	(Italy) F Bonsignori	2	3
7	(Italy) K Piccolini	6	6

=== Bottom half ===
First round
8	(Hungary) C Bartos	6	7^{7}
(Czechoslovakia) E Švíglerová	4	6^{0}
(United Kingdom) S Smith	6	6
(Hungary) P Schmitt	2	4
(Italy) F Romano	6	7^{7}
LL	(Italy) L Jachia	4	6^{1}
Q	(West Germany) C Hofmann	1	0
4	(Sweden) C Dahlman	6	6
5	(Bulgaria) E Pampoulova	7	3	6
(Australia) JA Faull	5	6	3
(France) M Pierce	6	6
(United States) A Gooden	4	1
(Argentina) F Haumüller	3	6^{5}
(Luxembourg) K Kschwendt	6	7^{7}
Q	(Finland) P Thorén	6	7^{7}
2	(Italy) L Garrone	2	6^{4}

Second round
8	(Hungary) C Bartos	6	2	4
(United Kingdom) S Smith	4	6	6
(Italy) F Romano	3	6	3
4	(Sweden) C Dahlman	6	3	6
5	(Bulgaria) E Pampoulova	1	2
(France) M Pierce	6	6
(Luxembourg) K Kschwendt	3	4
Q	(Finland) P Thorén	6	6

Quarterfinals
(United Kingdom) S Smith	1	4
4	(Sweden) C Dahlman	6	6
(France) M Pierce	6	6
Q	(Finland) P Thorén	1	1

Semifinals
4	(Sweden) C Dahlman	6	3	6
(France) M Pierce	4	6	4
