= 1987 French Open – Women's doubles =

Women's doubles
- 1987 French Open

Final
- Champion: (United States) Martina Navratilova (United States) Pam Shriver
- Runner-up: (West Germany) Steffi Graf (Argentina) Gabriela Sabatini
- Score: 6–2, 6–1

Details
- Draw: 64
- Seeds: 8

Events
Singles	men	women		boys	girls
Doubles	men	women	mixed	boys	girls
WC Singles	men	women	quad
WC Doubles	men	women	quad
Legends	−45	45+	women
- French Open

Defending champion Martina Navratilova and her partner Pam Shriver defeated Steffi Graf and Gabriela Sabatini in the final, 6–2, 6–1 to win the women's doubles tennis title at the 1987 French Open. It was Navratilova's fourth consecutive French Open title in women's doubles. This was also Navratilova’s record 16th consecutive grand slam doubles final, dating back to the 1983 Wimbledon doubles, all of which were with Shriver, except the 1986 French Open doubles. Navratilova would 14 grand slam doubles championships during the aforementioned streak, 13 with Shriver.

Navratilova and Andrea Temesvári were the reigning champions, but Navratilova had resumed her longtime partnership with Shriver.

== Seeds ==
1. (United States) Martina Navratilova / (United States) Pam Shriver (champions)
2. (West Germany) Steffi Graf / (Argentina) Gabriela Sabatini (final)
3. (West Germany) Claudia Kohde-Kilsch / (Czechoslovakia) Helena Suková (semifinals)
4. (United States) Elise Burgin / (South Africa) Rosalyn Fairbank (second round)
5. (United States) Betsy Nagelsen / (Australia) Elizabeth Smylie (quarterfinals)
6. (Czechoslovakia) Hana Mandlíková / (France) Catherine Tanvier (first round)
7. (Puerto Rico) Gigi Fernández / (United States) Lori McNeil (quarterfinals)
8. (Argentina) Mercedes Paz / (West Germany) Eva Pfaff (quarterfinals)

== Draw ==
Key

- Q = Qualifier
- WC = Wild card
- LL = Lucky loser
- Alt = Alternate
- ITF = ITF entry
- PR = Protected ranking
- SR = Special ranking
- SE = Special exempt
- JE = Junior exempt
- JR = Junior Accelerator Programme entrant
- CO = College Accelerator Programme entrant
- NG = Next Gen Accelerator Program entrant
- w/o = Walkover
- r = Retired
- d = Defaulted

=== Finals ===
Quarterfinals
1	(United States) Martina Navratilova (United States) Pam Shriver	6	4	6
(France) Isabelle Demongeot (France) Nathalie Tauziat	3	6	4
3	(West Germany) Claudia Kohde-Kilsch (Czechoslovakia) Helena Suková	6^{6}	6	6
6	(Puerto Rico) Gigi Fernández (United States) Lori McNeil	7	1	2
5	(United States) Betsy Nagelsen (Australia) Elizabeth Smylie	7	1	3
(Australia) Jenny Byrne (United States) Kathy Rinaldi	5	6	6
8	(Argentina) Mercedes Paz (West Germany) Eva Pfaff	2	3
2	(West Germany) Steffi Graf (Argentina) Gabriela Sabatini	6	6

Semifinals
1	(United States) Martina Navratilova (United States) Pam Shriver	7	6
3	(West Germany) Claudia Kohde-Kilsch (Czechoslovakia) Helena Suková	6^{4}	3
(Australia) Jenny Byrne (United States) Kathy Rinaldi	1	4
2	(West Germany) Steffi Graf (Argentina) Gabriela Sabatini	6	6

Final
1	(United States) Martina Navratilova (United States) Pam Shriver	6	6
2	(West Germany) Steffi Graf (Argentina) Gabriela Sabatini	2	1

=== Top half ===
==== Section 1 ====
First round
1	(United States) M Navratilova (United States) P Shriver	6	6
(Peru) L Gildemeister (West Germany) C Porwik	2	2
(Switzerland) C Cohen (United Kingdom) S Gomer	4	4
(United States) A Henricksson (United States) M Van Nostrand	6	6
(South Africa) E Reinach (South Africa) M Reinach	6	6
(United Kingdom) A Croft (United States) S Mascarin	1	4
(United States) T Phelps (Italy) R Reggi	6	6
(United States) K Horvath (Netherlands) M Mesker	2	2
(France) I Demongeot (France) N Tauziat	7	2	6
(United States) MJ Fernández (United States) M Werdel	6^{5}	6	4
(Italy) S Cecchini (Socialist Federal Republic of Yugoslavia) S Goleš	6	6^{7}	6
(France) P Etchemendy (France) V Paquet	4	7	3
(France) S Amiach (France) N Herreman	6	6
(Australia) L Field (Australia) E Minter	2	4
(Czechoslovakia) K Böhmová (Australia) M Jaggard	w/o
6	(Czechoslovakia) H Mandlíková (France) C Tanvier

Second round
1	(United States) M Navratilova (United States) P Shriver	6	6
(United States) A Henricksson (United States) M Van Nostrand	0	2
(South Africa) E Reinach (South Africa) M Reinach	2	1
(United States) T Phelps (Italy) R Reggi	6	6
(France) I Demongeot (France) N Tauziat	2	6	6
(Italy) S Cecchini (Socialist Federal Republic of Yugoslavia) S Goleš	6	1	4
(France) S Amiach (France) N Herreman	6	6
(Czechoslovakia) K Böhmová (Australia) M Jaggard	2	4

Third round
1	(United States) M Navratilova (United States) P Shriver	6	6
(United States) T Phelps (Italy) R Reggi	4	4
(France) I Demongeot (France) N Tauziat	7	6
(France) S Amiach (France) N Herreman	6^{4}	1

Quarterfinals
1	(United States) M Navratilova (United States) P Shriver	6	4	6
(France) I Demongeot (France) N Tauziat	3	6	4

==== Section 2 ====
First round
3	(West Germany) C Kohde-Kilsch (Czechoslovakia) H Suková	6	6
(Czechoslovakia) H Fukárková (Czechoslovakia) R Zrubáková	2	0
(West Germany) W Probst (Argentina) P Tarabini	6	6
(Italy) L Garrone (Italy) C Nozzoli	0	3
(United States) T Holladay (Netherlands) N Schutte	6^{0}	3
(West Germany) A Betzner (West Germany) C Singer	7	6
(Australia) D Balestrat (Canada) C Bassett	7	6
(United States) G Magers (United States) S Walsh-Pete	6^{4}	3
(Canada) J Hetherington (United States) J Russell	4	7	1
(Netherlands) C Bakkum (Netherlands) M van der Torre	6	5	6
(United States) T Mochizuki (France) N Phan-Thanh	4	6^{4}
(Australia) A Minter (United States) J Mundel	6	7
(Poland) I Kuczyńska (Czechoslovakia) R Rajchrtová	6	6
(Netherlands) M Bollegraf (Sweden) M Lindström	1	4
(Italy) F Bonsignori (Netherlands) H ter Riet	1	3
7	(Puerto Rico) G Fernández (United States) L McNeil	6	6

Second round
3	(West Germany) C Kohde-Kilsch (Czechoslovakia) H Suková	6	6
(West Germany) W Probst (Argentina) P Tarabini	1	4
(West Germany) A Betzner (West Germany) C Singer	6	4	9
(Australia) D Balestrat (Canada) C Bassett	4	6	6
(Netherlands) C Bakkum (Netherlands) M van der Torre	6^{5}	7	1
(Australia) A Minter (United States) J Mundel	7	6^{5}	6
(Poland) I Kuczyńska (Czechoslovakia) R Rajchrtová	1	2
7	(Puerto Rico) G Fernández (United States) L McNeil	6	6

Third round
3	(West Germany) C Kohde-Kilsch (Czechoslovakia) H Suková	7	6
(Australia) D Balestrat (Canada) C Bassett	6^{1}	2
(Australia) A Minter (United States) J Mundel	4	4
7	(Puerto Rico) G Fernández (United States) L McNeil	6	6

Quarterfinals
3	(West Germany) C Kohde-Kilsch (Czechoslovakia) H Suková	6^{6}	6	6
7	(Puerto Rico) G Fernández (United States) L McNeil	7	1	2

=== Bottom half ===
==== Section 3 ====
First round
5	(United States) B Nagelsen (Australia) E Smylie	7	6
(France) F Martin (France) S Niox-Château	5	3
(United States) DA Hansel (United States) J Kaplan	1	6^{4}
(Argentina) B Fulco (Argentina) G Mosca	6	7
(Switzerland) L Drescher (Australia) L O'Neill	5	1
(United States) L Antonoplis (Brazil) C Monteiro	7	6
(France) E Derly (France) M Laval	6	6
(United States) B Gerken (Hong Kong) P Hy	3	2
(Sweden) C Lindqvist (Denmark) T Scheuer-Larsen	7	6
(Sweden) C Karlsson (Australia) N Provis	6^{4}	2
(United States) J Golder (Socialist Federal Republic of Yugoslavia) M Jaušovec	1	6	2
(United States) P Barg (United States) B Herr	6	4	6
(Argentina) M Pérez Roldán (Argentina) A Tiezzi	1	0
(Australia) J Byrne (United States) K Rinaldi	6	6
(Netherlands) N Jagerman (Mexico) H Steden	3	2
4	(United States) E Burgin (South Africa) R Fairbank	6	6

Second round
5	(United States) B Nagelsen (Australia) E Smylie	6	6
(Argentina) B Fulco (Argentina) G Mosca	3	3
(United States) L Antonoplis (Brazil) C Monteiro	3	7	6
(France) E Derly (France) M Laval	6	6^{2}	0
(Sweden) C Lindqvist (Denmark) T Scheuer-Larsen	3	6	3
(United States) P Barg (United States) B Herr	6	0	6
(Australia) J Byrne (United States) K Rinaldi	0	7	6
4	(United States) E Burgin (South Africa) R Fairbank	6	5	3

Third round
5	(United States) B Nagelsen (Australia) E Smylie	6	6
(United States) L Antonoplis (Brazil) C Monteiro	3	2
(United States) P Barg (United States) B Herr	3	6^{3}
(Australia) J Byrne (United States) K Rinaldi	6	7

Quarterfinals
5	(United States) B Nagelsen (Australia) E Smylie	7	1	3
(Australia) J Byrne (United States) K Rinaldi	5	6	6

==== Section 4 ====
First round
8	(Argentina) M Paz (West Germany) E Pfaff	6	7
(Switzerland) C Cserepy (Austria) P Huber	2	6^{5}
(United States) P Smith (United States) N Sodupe	7	7
(Canada) H Kelesi (Romania) V Ruzici	5	6^{4}
(United States) AM Fernandez (New Zealand) J Richardson	6	3	4
(Japan) K Okamoto (Japan) N Sato	4	6	6
(Czechoslovakia) I Budařová (Argentina) A Villagrán	6^{3}	3
(Czechoslovakia) J Novotná (France) C Suire	7	6
(Bulgaria) K Maleeva (Bulgaria) M Maleeva	1	4
(West Germany) I Cueto (Spain) A Sánchez Vicario	6	6
(South Africa) K Schimper (Japan) M Yanagi	6	3	11
(Brazil) N Dias (Brazil) P Medrado	1	6	9
(Czechoslovakia) R Maršíková (West Germany) S Meier	6	7
(United States) C Benjamin (South Africa) D Van Rensburg	4	5
(United States) M Gurney (United States) V Nelson-Dunbar	2	2
2	(West Germany) S Graf (Argentina) G Sabatini	6	6

Second round
8	(Argentina) M Paz (West Germany) E Pfaff	7	6	1
(United States) P Smith (United States) N Sodupe	6^{4}	3
(Japan) K Okamoto (Japan) N Sato	3	4
(Czechoslovakia) J Novotná (France) C Suire	6	6
(West Germany) I Cueto (Spain) A Sánchez Vicario	6	6
(South Africa) K Schimper (Japan) M Yanagi	4	2
(Czechoslovakia) R Maršíková (West Germany) S Meier	1	6^{5}
2	(West Germany) S Graf (Argentina) G Sabatini	6	7

Third round
8	(Argentina) M Paz (West Germany) E Pfaff	2	6	9
(Czechoslovakia) J Novotná (France) C Suire	6	4	7
(West Germany) I Cueto (Spain) A Sánchez Vicario	6^{9}	0
2	(West Germany) S Graf (Argentina) G Sabatini	7	6

Quarterfinals
8	(Argentina) M Paz (West Germany) E Pfaff	2	3
2	(West Germany) S Graf (Argentina) G Sabatini	6	6
