= Kirsten Dreyer =

American tennis player

- Country (sports): United States
- Born: March 27, 1969 (age 55)
- Prize money: $28,567

Singles
- Career record: 85–65
- Career titles: 3 ITF
- Highest ranking: No. 263 (September 14, 1987)

Grand Slam singles results
- French Open: Q1 (1985)
- Wimbledon: Q1 (1985)
- US Open: Q1 (1985)

Doubles
- Career record: 41–30
- Career titles: 3 ITF
- Highest ranking: No. 229 (February 3, 1992)

Kirsten Dreyer (born March 27, 1969) is an American former professional tennis player.

== Biography ==
Early career

Raised in Connecticut, Dreyer achieved early success, winning the national 16 and under indoor championship in 1983. At 15 years old, She began her professional career on the tour the following year.

Dreyer qualified for her first Virginia Slims main draw in 1985. That season, she also participated in the qualifiers of three Grand Slam tournaments.

College tennis

Dreyer took a break from professional tennis to pursue collegiate athletics, playing for the UCLA Bruins from 1988 to 1991.

Return to professional tennis

In 1992, her final year on the professional tour, Dreyer reached the second round at the Indian Wells. She achieved this by defeating Mariaan de Swardt (at the time the world number 53) in the opening round.

== ITF finals ==
=== Singles: 6 (3–3) ===
Result	No.	Date	Tournament	Surface	Opponent	Score
Win	1.	November 26, 1984	Darlington, United Kingdom	Hard	(Sweden) Elisabeth Ekblom	6–4, 2–6, 6–3
Win	2.	December 3, 1984	Hull, United Kingdom	Hard	(Sweden) Elisabeth Ekblom	4–6, 6–3, 6–4
Loss	1.	December 31, 1984	Chicago, United States	Hard	(France) Isabelle Demongeot	6–1, 2–6, 4–6
Loss	2.	November 2, 1986	Kailua-Kona, United States	Hard	(United States) Kathrin Keil	5–7, 6–2, 5–7
Loss	3.	June 21, 1987	Birmingham, United States	Hard	(United States) Tammy Whittington	6–2, 1–6, 1–6
Win	3.	May 26, 1991	Aguascalientes, Mexico	Hard	(Cuba) Rita Pichardo	7–6^{(4)}, 6–3

=== Doubles: 5 (3–2) ===
Result	No.	Date	Tournament	Surface	Partner	Opponents	Score
Win	1.	November 18, 1984	Tipton, United Kingdom	Hard	(United States) Holly Danforth	(United Kingdom) Elizabeth Jones (United Kingdom) Lorrayne Gracie	6–3, 3–6, 6–3
Loss	1.	August 19, 1990	Chatham, United States	Hard	(Republic of Ireland) Siobhán Nicholson	(United States) Kathy Foxworth (United States) Shannan McCarthy	2–6, 6–7^{(6)}
Win	2.	July 29, 1991	Haifa, Israel	Hard	(South Africa) Tessa Price	(South Africa) Janine Humphreys (Namibia) Elizma Nortje	6–1, 6–0
Loss	2.	August 12, 1991	Ashkelon, Israel	Hard	(South Africa) Tessa Price	(Israel) Ilana Berger (South Africa) Robyn Field	w/o
Win	3.	January 12, 1992	Woodlands, United States	Hard	(United States) Stella Sampras	(United States) Dierdre Herman (United States) Wendy Nelson	6–3, 6–4
