= 1986 Athens Trophy =

- Date: 15–21 September
- Edition: 1st
- Draw: 32S / 16D
- Prize money: $75,000
- Surface: Clay / outdoor
- Location: Athens, Greece

Champions

Singles
- (West Germany) Sylvia Hanika

Doubles
- (West Germany) Isabel Cueto / (Spain) Arantxa Sánchez
- Athens Trophy

The 1986 Athens Trophy was a women's tennis tournament played on outdoor clay courts in Athens, Greece that was part of the 1986 Virginia Slims World Championship Series. It was the inaugural edition of the tournament and was held from 15 September until 21 September 1986. Fifth-seeded Sylvia Hanika won the singles title.

== Finals ==
=== Singles ===
(West Germany) Sylvia Hanika defeated (Greece) Angeliki Kanellopoulou 7–5, 6–1

- It was Hanika's only singles title of the year and the 3rd of her career.

=== Doubles ===
(West Germany) Isabel Cueto / (Spain) Arantxa Sánchez defeated (West Germany) Silke Meier / (West Germany) Wiltrud Probst 4–6, 6–2, 6–4

- It was Cueto's only title of the year and the 1st of her career. It was Sánchez's only title of the year and the 1st of her career.

== See also ==
- 1986 Athens Open – men's tournament
