= Olga Votavová =

Czech tennis player

- Country (sports): Czechoslovakia
- Born: 10 July 1966 (age 59) Cheb, Czechoslovakia
- College: Syracuse University
- Prize money: $27,021

Singles
- Highest ranking: No. 169 (19 January 1987)

Grand Slam singles results
- French Open: 1R (1987)
- Wimbledon: 1R (1987)

Doubles
- Highest ranking: No. 247 (25 April 1988)

Olga Votavová (born 10 July 1966) is a Czech former professional tennis player.

Born in Cheb, Votavová played on the professional tour during the 1980s and reached a best singles ranking of No. 169 in the world.

Votavová was runner-up at the Swedish Open in 1985, prior to the tournament becoming part of the main tour. Her best performance on the Virginia Slims circuit instead came at the Bregenz in 1986, where she made it to the quarter-finals.

== ITF finals ==
Legend
$25,000 tournaments
$10,000 tournaments

=== Singles: 4 (2–2) ===
Result	No.	Date	Tournament	Surface	Opponent	Score
Win	1.	1 October 1984	Bol, Yugoslavia	Clay	(Czechoslovakia) Jana Novotná	6–3, 6–2
Loss	1.	15 July 1985	Båstad, Sweden	Clay	(Sweden) Maria Lindström	6–4, 3–6, 5–7
Loss	2.	6 April 1986	Bari, Italy	Clay	(Argentina) Patricia Tarabini	0–6, 4–6
Win	2.	3 August 1986	Hechingen, West Germany	Clay	(Austria) Barbara Pollet	6–1, 6–2

=== Doubles: 4 (2–2) ===
Result	No.	Date	Tournament	Surface	Partner	Opponents	Score
Win	1.	25 August 1984	Rheda-Wiedenbrück, West Germany	Clay	(Czechoslovakia) Andrea Holíková	(Argentina) Andrea Tiezzi (Argentina) Isabelle Villaverde	7–5, 6–4
Loss	1.	29 July 1985	Neumünster, West Germany	Hard	(Czechoslovakia) Hana Fukárková	(Czechoslovakia) Yvona Brzáková (Czechoslovakia) Marie Pinterová	0–6, 5–7
Win	2.	5 August 1985	Kitzbühel, Austria	Clay	(Czechoslovakia) Hana Fukárková	(Czechoslovakia) Nora Bajčíková (Czechoslovakia) Petra Tesarová	7–5, 6–3
Loss	2.	11 April 1988	Caserta, Italy	Clay	(Netherlands) Hellas ter Riet	(United States) Jennifer Fuchs (Sweden) Maria Strandlund	6–2, 3–6, 1–6
