= Hana Guy =

New Zealand tennis player

- Country (sports): Czechoslovakia; New Zealand
- Born: 8 June 1969 (age 56)
- Retired: 1993
- Prize money: $31,166

Singles
- Career record: 46–73
- Career titles: 1 ITF
- Highest ranking: No. 214 (25 March 1991)

Doubles
- Career record: 24–44
- Career titles: 2 ITF
- Highest ranking: No. 239 (11 April 1988)

Hana Guy (born 8 June 1969) is a Czech-New Zealand former professional tennis player. Before marriage she played under the name Hana Adámková.

== Biography ==
Originally competing for her native Czechoslovakia, Adámková started playing professional tournaments in 1986. She reached a best singles ranking of 214 in the world and featured in the qualifying draw of all four grand slam events during her career. Her only WTA Tour main draw appearance came in doubles, at Schenectady in 1990.

In 1991, she married New Zealand tennis player Steve Guy, who were both at the time playing for the same tennis club in Offenbach am Main, Germany.

Guy played two Fed Cup matches for New Zealand in 1992. On debut, she was well beaten by Anke Huber as Germany went on to demote New Zealand to the World Group playoffs. In the playoff against Paraguay she lost her match to Larissa Schaerer in three sets.

Both Guy and husband Steve run a tennis school in the German city of Fulda.

== ITF finals ==
=== Singles (1–0) ===
Legend
$25,000 tournaments
$10,000 tournaments

Result	No.	Date	Tournament	Surface	Opponent	Score
Win	1.	13 November 1989	Adelaide, Australia	Hard	(Australia) Lisa O'Neill	6–3, 6–3

=== Doubles (2–1) ===
Result	No.	Date	Tournament	Surface	Partner	Opponents	Score
Win	1.	8 June 1987	Carpi, Italy	Clay	(Australia) Kate McDonald	(Czechoslovakia) Nora Bajčíková (Czechoslovakia) Petra Langrová	6–7, 7–5, 7–5
Loss	2.	15 June 1987	Salerno, Italy	Clay	(Australia) Kate McDonald	(West Germany) Veronika Martinek (Romania) Daniela Moise	6–7, 2–6
Win	3.	2 September 1991	Bad Nauheim, Germany	Clay	(Germany) Eva-Maria Schürhoff	(Poland) Katharzyna Teodorowicz (Poland) Agata Werblińska	7–6, 6–2
