= Nora Bajčíková =

Slovak tennis player

- Full name: Nora Trinler Bajčíková
- Country (sports): Czechoslovakia; Slovakia
- Born: 31 December 1966 Bratislava, Czechoslovakia
- Died: 2014 (aged 48) Switzerland
- Prize money: $23,233

Singles
- Career record: 66–64
- Career titles: 1 ITF
- Highest ranking: No. 350 (21 December 1986)

Doubles
- Career record: 79–54
- Career titles: 5 ITF
- Highest ranking: No. 199 (21 December 1986)
Medal record
Representing Czechoslovakia
Summer Universiade
Silver medal – second place	1987 Zagreb	Doubles

Nora Trinler Bajčíková (31 December 1966 — 2014) was a Slovak professional tennis player.

Bajčíková, as a representative of Czechoslovakia, was a women's doubles semi-finalist at the 1987 Summer Universiade in Zagreb, partnering Iva Budařová. From the early 1990s she began competing under her married name Nora Kovarcikova. She had career high rankings of 350 in singles and 199 in doubles. Her daughter Lucia Kovarčíková is also a professional tennis player.

== ITF finals ==
Legend
$25,000 tournaments
$10,000 tournaments

=== Singles: 4 (1–3) ===
Result	No.	Date	Tournament	Surface	Opponent	Score
Loss	1.	4 November 1985	Peterborough, United Kingdom	Hard	(Sweden) Cecilia Dahlman	5–7, 2–6
Loss	2.	4 June 1989	Katowice, Poland	Clay	(West Germany) Anke Huber	1–6, 2–6
Loss	3.	31 August 1992	Toluca, Mexico	Hard	(Canada) Jana Nejedly	4–6, 4–6
Win	4.	5 October 1992	Mexico City, Mexico	Clay	(Mexico) Lucila Becerra	7–5, 5–7, 7–6

=== Doubles: 13 (5–8) ===
Result	No.	Date	Tournament	Surface	Partner	Opponents	Score
Loss	1.	5 August 1985	Kitzbuhel, Austria	Clay	(Czechoslovakia) Petra Tesarová	(Czechoslovakia) Olga Votavová (Czechoslovakia) Hana Fukárková	5–7, 3–6
Win	1.	1 June 1987	Adria, Italy	Clay	(Czechoslovakia) Petra Langrová	(United States) Erika Smith (Hungary) Réka Szikszay	6–7, 7–5, 6–2
Loss	2.	8 June 1987	Carpi, Italy	Clay	(Czechoslovakia) Petra Langrová	(New Zealand) Hana Guy (Australia) Kate McDonald	7–6, 5–7, 5–7
Loss	3.	27 July 1987	Neumünster, West Germany	Clay	(Czechoslovakia) Iva Budařová	(Czechoslovakia) Denisa Krajčovičová (Czechoslovakia) Radka Zrubáková	0–6, 2–6
Loss	4.	3 August 1987	Rheda-Wiedenbrück, West Germany	Clay	(Czechoslovakia) Denisa Krajčovičová	(Czechoslovakia) Hana Fukárková (Czechoslovakia) Jana Pospíšilová	2–6, 0–6
Loss	5.	20 August 1987	Darmstadt, West Germany	Clay	(Czechoslovakia) Denisa Krajčovičová	(Czechoslovakia) Hana Fukárková (Czechoslovakia) Jana Pospíšilová	0–6, 3–6
Win	2.	8 August 1988	Darmstadt, West Germany	Clay	(Czechoslovakia) Petra Holubová	(South Africa) Nelia Kruger (West Germany) Eva-Maria Schürhoff	5–7, 6–3, 6–3
Loss	6.	28 November 1988	Budapest, Hungary	Carpet	(Czechoslovakia) Petra Holubová	(Poland) Sylvia Czopek (Hungary) Antonia Homolya	6–7, 2–6
Loss	7.	24 April 1989	Dubrovnik, Yugoslavia	Clay	(Czechoslovakia) Petra Holubová	(Hungary) Réka Szikszay (Hungary) Virág Csurgó	0–6, 0–1 ret.
Win	3.	17 July 1989	Darmstadt, West Germany	Clay	(Czechoslovakia) Petra Holubová	(Sweden) Maria Ekstrand (Switzerland) Michèle Strebel	6–3, 6–2
Win	4.	31 July 1989	Rheda-Wiedenbrück, West Germany	Clay	(Czechoslovakia) Petra Holubová	(Australia) Danielle Jones (Australia) Lisa Keller	6–1, 6–2
Loss	8.	22 May 1994	Katowice, Poland	Clay	(Slovakia) Zuzana Nemšáková	(Czech Republic) Lenka Cenková (Czech Republic) Alena Vašková	w/o
Win	5.	8 August 1994	Paderborn, Germany	Clay	(Slovakia) Simona Nedorostová	(Colombia) Carmiña Giraldo (South Africa) Nannie de Villiers	2–6, 4–6
