= Marianne Groat =

Canadian tennis player

- Country (sports): Canada
- Born: June 5, 1965 (age 61)
- Prize money: $21,900

Singles
- Career record: 25–29

Grand Slam singles results
- French Open: Q1 (1985)
- Wimbledon: 1R (1985)
- US Open: Q1 (1985)

Other tournaments
- Olympic Games: 1R (1984)

Doubles
- Career record: 2–2

Marianne Groat (born June 5, 1965) is a Canadian former professional tennis player.

== Biography ==
Groat grew up in St. Catharines, Ontario and competed on the professional tour in the 1980s.

In 1984, Groat represented Canada in the tennis demonstration event at the Los Angeles Olympics and played a singles rubber in two Federation Cup ties for Canada. She lost her first Federation Cup match to Italy's Sandra Cecchini, then beat Chilean player Paulina Sepúlveda in her second match. Her best performance on the WTA Tour came at the 1984 Brasil Open, where she made the quarter-finals.

At the 1985 Wimbledon Championships she featured in the main draw of the women's singles.

From 1985 to 1986, Groat attended Clemson University on a tennis scholarship. While at Clemson she was a member of an ACC championship team and formed a strong doubles partnership with Ingelise Driehuis, going 24–5 as a pairing in 1986.

== See also ==
- List of Canada Fed Cup team representatives
