= 1990 Athens Trophy =

- Date: 10–16 September
- Edition: 5th
- Category: Tier V
- Draw: 32S / 16D
- Prize money: $75,000
- Surface: Clay
- Location: Athens, Greece

Champions

Singles
- (Sweden) Cecilia Dahlman

Doubles
- (Italy) Laura Garrone / (Luxembourg) Karin Kschwendt
← 1989 ·	Athens Trophy

The 1990 Athens Trophy was a women's tennis tournament played on outdoor clay courts in Athens, Greece that was part of Tier V of the 1990 WTA Tour. It was the fifth edition of the tournament and was held from 10 September through 16 September 1990. Fourth-seeded Cecilia Dahlman won the singles title and earned $13, 500 first-prize money.

== Finals ==
=== Singles ===
(Sweden) Cecilia Dahlman defeated (Italy) Katia Piccolini 7–5, 7–5

- It was Dahlman's only singles title of the year and the 2nd of her career.

=== Doubles ===
(Italy) Laura Garrone / (Luxembourg) Karin Kschwendt defeated (Czechoslovakia) Leona Lásková / (Czechoslovakia) Jana Pospíšilová 6–0, 1–6, 7–6^{(8–6)}

- It was Garrone's 2nd title of the year and the 3rd of her career. It was Kschwendt's 2nd title of the year and the 2nd of her career.

== See also ==
- 1990 Athens Open – men's tournament
