= 1989 Athens Trophy =

- Date: 11–17 September
- Edition: 4th
- Category: Category 1
- Draw: 32S / 16D
- Prize money: $75,000
- Surface: Clay / outdoor
- Location: Athens, Greece

Champions

Singles
- (Sweden) Cecilia Dahlman

Doubles
- (Italy) Sandra Cecchini / (Argentina) Patricia Tarabini
← 1988 ·	Athens Trophy	· 1990 →

The 1989 Athens Trophy was a women's tennis tournament played on outdoor clay courts in Athens, Greece that was part of the Category 1 tier of the 1989 WTA Tour. It was the fourth edition of the tournament and was held from 11 September through 17 September 1989. Unseeded Cecilia Dahlman won the singles title.

== Finals ==
=== Singles ===
(Sweden) Cecilia Dahlman defeated (Australia) Rachel McQuillan 6–3, 1–6, 7–5

- It was Dahlman's only title of the year and the 1st of her career.

=== Doubles ===
(Italy) Sandra Cecchini / (Argentina) Patricia Tarabini defeated (West Germany) Silke Meier / (Bulgaria) Elena Pampoulova 4–6, 6–4, 6–2

- It was Cecchini's 2nd title of the year and the 12th of her career. It was Tarabini's 2nd title of the year and the 2nd of her career.

== See also ==
- 1989 Athens Open – men's tournament
