= 1986 French Open – Women's doubles =

Women's doubles
- 1986 French Open

Final
- Champion: (United States) Martina Navratilova (Hungary) Andrea Temesvári
- Runner-up: (West Germany) Steffi Graf (Argentina) Gabriela Sabatini
- Score: 6–1, 6–2

Details
- Draw: 64
- Seeds: 16

Events
Singles	men	women		boys	girls
Doubles	men	women	mixed	boys	girls
WC Singles	men	women	quad
WC Doubles	men	women	quad
Legends	−45	45+	women
← 1985 ·	French Open	· 1987 →

Defending champion Martina Navratilova and her partner Andrea Temesvári defeated Steffi Graf and Gabriela Sabatini in the final, 6–1, 6–2 to win the women's doubles tennis title at the 1986 French Open.

Navratilova and Pam Shriver were the two-time reigning champions, but Shriver did not participate this year.

== Seeds ==
1. (West Germany) Claudia Kohde-Kilsch / (Czechoslovakia) Helena Suková (semifinals)
2. (Czechoslovakia) Hana Mandlíková / (Australia) Wendy Turnbull (semifinals)
3. (United States) Martina Navratilova / (Hungary) Andrea Temesvári (champions)
4. (United States) Chris Evert-Lloyd / (United States) Anne White (third round)
5. (United States) Elise Burgin / (South Africa) Rosalyn Fairbank (second round)
6. (West Germany) Steffi Graf / (Argentina) Gabriela Sabatini (final)
7. (West Germany) Bettina Bunge / (West Germany) Eva Pfaff (third round)
8. (United States) Betsy Nagelsen / (United States) Candy Reynolds (second round)
9. (United States) Kathy Jordan / (United States) Alycia Moulton (quarterfinals)
10. (Soviet Union) Svetlana Parkhomenko / (Soviet Union) Larisa Savchenko (quarterfinals)
11. (United States) Anne Smith / (United States) Sharon Walsh-Pete (quarterfinals)
12. (United States) Lori McNeil / (France) Catherine Suire (first round)
13. (United States) Zina Garrison / (United States) Kathy Rinaldi (first round)
14. (Netherlands) Marcella Mesker / (France) Pascale Paradis (third round)
15. (United Kingdom) Jo Durie / (United Kingdom) Anne Hobbs (second round)
16. (Canada) Jill Hetherington / (United States) Terry Holladay (first round)

== Draw ==
=== Key ===
- Q = Qualifier
- WC = Wild card
- LL = Lucky loser
- Alt = Alternate
- SE = Special exempt
- PR = Protected ranking
- ITF = ITF entry
- JE = Junior exempt
- w/o = Walkover
- r = Retired
- d = Defaulted
- SR = Special ranking

=== Finals ===
Quarterfinals
1	(West Germany) Claudia Kohde-Kilsch (Czechoslovakia) Helena Suková	4	6	6
10	(Soviet Union) Svetlana Parkhomenko (Soviet Union) Larisa Savchenko	6	1	1
(Bulgaria) Katerina Maleeva (Bulgaria) Manuela Maleeva	3	3
6	(West Germany) Steffi Graf (Argentina) Gabriela Sabatini	6	6
9	(United States) Kathy Jordan (United States) Alycia Moulton	6^{4}	6^{3}
3	(United States) Martina Navratilova (Hungary) Andrea Temesvári	7	7
11	(United States) Anne Smith (United States) Sharon Walsh-Pete	2	1
2	(Czechoslovakia) Hana Mandlíková (Australia) Wendy Turnbull	6	6

Semifinals
1	(West Germany) Claudia Kohde-Kilsch (Czechoslovakia) Helena Suková	6	6^{4}	3
6	(West Germany) Steffi Graf (Argentina) Gabriela Sabatini	1	7	6
3	(United States) Martina Navratilova (Hungary) Andrea Temesvári	6	6
2	(Czechoslovakia) Hana Mandlíková (Australia) Wendy Turnbull	3	2

Final
6	(West Germany) Steffi Graf (Argentina) Gabriela Sabatini	1	2
3	(United States) Martina Navratilova (Hungary) Andrea Temesvári	6	6

=== Top half ===
==== Section 1 ====
First round
1	(West Germany) C Kohde-Kilsch (Czechoslovakia) H Suková	6	6
(Switzerland) E Krapl (West Germany) C Porwik	3	3
(Netherlands) C Bakkum (United States) J Golder	4	6	6
(Czechoslovakia) A Holíková (Czechoslovakia) K Skronská	6	3	8
(France) C Calmette (France) E Derly	4	2
(France) I Demongeot (France) N Tauziat	6	6
(Argentina) I Madruga-Osses (France) C Tanvier	6	3	7
13	(United States) Z Garrison (United States) K Rinaldi	4	6	5
10	(Soviet Union) S Parkhomenko (Soviet Union) L Savchenko	6	6
(Sweden) C Lindqvist (United States) J Russell	4	2
(Brazil) N Dias (Brazil) P Medrado	6	6
(United States) J Goodling (United States) V Nelson-Dunbar	2	4
(United States) H Crowe (United States) K Steinmetz	6	7
(Switzerland) L Drescher (Japan) E Inoue	3	5
(Australia) M Jaggard (France) C Vanier	6	5	3
7	(West Germany) B Bunge (West Germany) E Pfaff	2	7	6

Second round
1	(West Germany) C Kohde-Kilsch (Czechoslovakia) H Suková	6	5	6
(Czechoslovakia) A Holíková (Czechoslovakia) K Skronská	3	7	1
(France) I Demongeot (France) N Tauziat	6	6
(Argentina) I Madruga-Osses (France) C Tanvier	4	4
10	(Soviet Union) S Parkhomenko (Soviet Union) L Savchenko	6	6
(Brazil) N Dias (Brazil) P Medrado	0	4
(United States) H Crowe (United States) K Steinmetz	2	1
7	(West Germany) B Bunge (West Germany) E Pfaff	6	6

Third round
1	(West Germany) C Kohde-Kilsch (Czechoslovakia) H Suková	1	6	6
(France) I Demongeot (France) N Tauziat	6	1	2
10	(Soviet Union) S Parkhomenko (Soviet Union) L Savchenko	6^{7}	6	6
7	(West Germany) B Bunge (West Germany) E Pfaff	7	2	4

Quarterfinals
1	(West Germany) C Kohde-Kilsch (Czechoslovakia) H Suková	4	6	6
10	(Soviet Union) S Parkhomenko (Soviet Union) L Savchenko	6	1	1

==== Section 2 ====
First round
4	(United States) C Evert-Lloyd (United States) A White	3	6	6
(United States) C Benjamin (United States) N Hu	6	3	4
(Netherlands) N Schutte (Netherlands) M van der Torre	1	4
(Italy) S Cecchini (Socialist Federal Republic of Yugoslavia) S Goleš	6	6
(United States) D Farrell (United States) K Kinney	0	4
(Bulgaria) K Maleeva (Bulgaria) M Maleeva	6	6
(Socialist Federal Republic of Yugoslavia) M Jaušovec (Poland) I Kuczyńska	4	7	6
12	(United States) L McNeil (France) C Suire	6	6^{5}	4
15	(United Kingdom) J Durie (United Kingdom) A Hobbs	7	6
(France) S Amiach (United States) S Rimes	5	3
(Sweden) M Lindström (United States) P Smith	3	5
(Australia) J Byrne (Australia) J Tremelling	6	7
(United States) L Allen (United States) G Rush	6	4	3
(Czechoslovakia) H Fukárková (Czechoslovakia) J Novotná	4	6	6
(New Zealand) B Cordwell (Argentina) A Villagrán	0	1
6	(West Germany) S Graf (Argentina) G Sabatini	6	6

Second round
4	(United States) C Evert-Lloyd (United States) A White	4	7	6
(Italy) S Cecchini (Socialist Federal Republic of Yugoslavia) S Goleš	6	6^{2}	4
(Bulgaria) K Maleeva (Bulgaria) M Maleeva	6	7
(Socialist Federal Republic of Yugoslavia) M Jaušovec (Poland) I Kuczyńska	3	5
15	(United Kingdom) J Durie (United Kingdom) A Hobbs	6	5	4
(Australia) J Byrne (Australia) J Tremelling	4	7	6
(Czechoslovakia) H Fukárková (Czechoslovakia) J Novotná	0	0
6	(West Germany) S Graf (Argentina) G Sabatini	6	6

Third round
4	(United States) C Evert-Lloyd (United States) A White	6	4	2
(Bulgaria) K Maleeva (Bulgaria) M Maleeva	1	6	6
(Australia) J Byrne (Australia) J Tremelling	6	1	1
6	(West Germany) S Graf (Argentina) G Sabatini	4	6	6

Quarterfinals
(Bulgaria) K Maleeva (Bulgaria) M Maleeva	3	3
6	(West Germany) S Graf (Argentina) G Sabatini	6	6

=== Bottom half ===
==== Section 3 ====
First round
5	(United States) E Burgin (South Africa) R Fairbank	7	6
(France) A Dechaume (France) S Niox-Château	5	2
(United States) P Casale (United States) B Gerken	3	6^{5}
(Argentina) M Paz (United Kingdom) V Wade	6	7
(United States) T Phelps (Italy) R Reggi	6	4	6
(United States) J Kaplan (United States) T Mochizuki	3	6	1
(France) P Etchemendy (France) N Herreman	6^{1}	1
9	(United States) K Jordan (United States) A Moulton	7	6
14	(Netherlands) M Mesker (France) P Paradis	6	6
(United States) P Barg (United States) B Herr	3	2
(United States) M Gurney (United States) N Sodupe	6	2	2
(South Africa) E Reinach (South Africa) M Reinach	4	6	6
(Canada) C Bassett (United States) S Mascarin	6	6
(Australia) R Bryant (Brazil) C Monteiro	2	4
(West Germany) A Betzner (West Germany) M Schropp	1	1
3	(United States) M Navratilova (Hungary) A Temesvári	6	6

Second round
5	(United States) E Burgin (South Africa) R Fairbank	3	5
(Argentina) M Paz (United Kingdom) V Wade	6	7
(United States) T Phelps (Italy) R Reggi	6	1	5
9	(United States) K Jordan (United States) A Moulton	4	6	7
14	(Netherlands) M Mesker (France) P Paradis	6	6
(South Africa) E Reinach (South Africa) M Reinach	3	4
(Canada) C Bassett (United States) S Mascarin	6^{1}	3
3	(United States) M Navratilova (Hungary) A Temesvári	7	6

Third round
(Argentina) M Paz (United Kingdom) V Wade	0	4
9	(United States) K Jordan (United States) A Moulton	6	6
14	(Netherlands) M Mesker (France) P Paradis	6	1	2
3	(United States) M Navratilova (Hungary) A Temesvári	4	6	6

Quarterfinals
9	(United States) K Jordan (United States) A Moulton	6^{4}	6^{3}
3	(United States) M Navratilova (Hungary) A Temesvári	7	7

==== Section 4 ====
First round
8	(United States) B Nagelsen (United States) C Reynolds	6	6
(Australia) L Field (Australia) E Minter	3	2
(United States) AM Fernandez (New Zealand) J Richardson	2	6	5
(United States) K Horvath (Czechoslovakia) R Maršíková	6	2	7
(United States) L Bonder (Peru) L Gildemeister	6	6
(United Kingdom) A Croft (United Kingdom) S Gomer	3	4
(Japan) N Sato (Japan) M Yanagi	0	3
11	(United States) A Smith (United States) S Walsh-Pete	6	6
16	(Canada) J Hetherington (United States) T Holladay	5	4
(Czechoslovakia) I Budařová (Czechoslovakia) M Skuherská	7	6
(United States) A Henricksson (Switzerland) C Jolissaint	7	1	6
(United States) J Mundel (United States) M Torres	6^{5}	6	3
(Sweden) C Karlsson (Denmark) T Scheuer-Larsen	7	3	4
(United States) A Holton (South Africa) Y Vermaak	5	6	6
(Austria) P Huber (West Germany) P Keppeler	2	1
2	(Czechoslovakia) H Mandlíková (Australia) W Turnbull	6	6

Second round
8	(United States) B Nagelsen (United States) C Reynolds	4	6	1
(United States) K Horvath (Czechoslovakia) R Maršíková	6	1	6
(United States) L Bonder (Peru) L Gildemeister	6	3	2
11	(United States) A Smith (United States) S Walsh-Pete	4	6	6
(Czechoslovakia) I Budařová (Czechoslovakia) M Skuherská	6	6
(United States) A Henricksson (Switzerland) C Jolissaint	4	4
(United States) A Holton (South Africa) Y Vermaak	4	2
2	(Czechoslovakia) H Mandlíková (Australia) W Turnbull	6	6

Third round
(United States) K Horvath (Czechoslovakia) R Maršíková	5	6	4
11	(United States) A Smith (United States) S Walsh-Pete	7	2	6
(Czechoslovakia) I Budařová (Czechoslovakia) M Skuherská	1	3
2	(Czechoslovakia) H Mandlíková (Australia) W Turnbull	6	6

Quarterfinals
11	(United States) A Smith (United States) S Walsh-Pete	2	1
2	(Czechoslovakia) H Mandlíková (Australia) W Turnbull	6	6
