= Joy Cummings (tennis) =

American tennis player

- Full name: Joy Cummings Fuhr
- Country (sports): United States
- Born: October 6, 1962 (age 63)
- Prize money: US$ 18,051

Singles

Grand Slam singles results
- French Open: Q2 (1986)
- Wimbledon: Q1 (1986)
- US Open: Q1 (1983)

Joy Cummings Fuhr (born October 6, 1962) is an American former professional tennis player.

Active in tennis during the 1980s, Cummings earned seven First-Team All-Ivy selections while at Princeton University (four in singles and three in doubles). She competed on the international tour after college, featuring in the qualifying draws of the French Open and Wimbledon in 1986.

Cummings, a graduate of William & Mary Law School, now works as an attorney in Richmond, Virginia.
