= Eileen Tell =

American tennis player (born 1966)

- Country (sports): United States
- Born: December 1, 1966 (age 58)
- Height: 5 ft 9 in (175 cm)
- Prize money: $14,950

Singles

Grand Slam singles results
- French Open: 1R (1985)
- US Open: Q2 (1985)
Medal record
Maccabiah Games
Gold medal – first place	1985 Israel	Women's Doubles

Eileen Tell (born December 1, 1966) is an American tennis player. She won a gold medal in doubles at the 1985 Maccabiah Games in Israel.

== Biography ==
Born December 1, 1966, to a physicist, Tell grew up in Aberdeen Township, New Jersey and attended Matawan Regional High School.

While competing on the professional tour, Tell reached a best singles world ranking of around 120, with wins in WTA Tour tournaments over Camille Benjamin and Lucia Romanov. She was a main draw qualifier for the 1985 French Open, losing in the first round to Katerina Maleeva.

Tell played an unusual match against Steffi Graf at the 1984 North American Open in Livingston, where after getting to match point against the West German decided to forfeit, as she wouldn't have been able to play on in the tournament due to a clash with the U.S. Clay Court Championships. The clay court event in Indianapolis was more beneficial in terms of ranking points (she fell in qualifying).

Tell won a gold medal in doubles, playing with Ronni Reis, at the 1985 Maccabiah Games in Israel.

Following her brief time on tour, Tell went to the University of Texas on a tennis scholarship, but gave up on varsity tennis and in 1988 completed a bachelor's degree, double majoring in economics and math.
