= Hélène Cedet =

French tennis player

- Country (sports): France
- Born: 21 March 1965 (age 59)

Singles

Grand Slam singles results
- French Open: 1R (1984)

Hélène Cedet (born 21 March 1965) is a French former professional tennis player.

Cedet featured in the singles main draw of the 1984 French Open and lost her first round match in three sets to Melissa Brown. While competing during the 1980s she was ranked amongst the top 20 players in France.
