= Virginie Paquet =

French tennis player (born 1967)

- Full name: Virginie Paquet-Ottaway
- Country (sports): France
- Born: 6 May 1967 (age 58)
- Plays: Right-handed
- Prize money: $27,567

Singles
- Career record: 61–69
- Highest ranking: No. 208 (22 May 1989)

Grand Slam singles results
- Australian Open: 1R (1987)
- French Open: 2R (1986)

Doubles
- Career record: 37–34
- Career titles: 4 ITF
- Highest ranking: No. 116 (22 May 1989)

Grand Slam doubles results
- Australian Open: 1R (1989)
- French Open: 1R (1987, 1988)

Virginie Paquet Ottaway (born 6 May 1967) is a French former professional tennis player.

== Tennis career ==
A right-handed player, Paquet competed on the professional tour in the 1980s and early 1990s. She reached a career high singles ranking of 208 in the world and was ranked as high as 116 in doubles.

Paquet appeared in the main draws of both the Australian Open and French Open during her career. Her best grand slam performance came at the 1986 French Open, where she had a first round win over Maria Lindström, before falling in the second round to fifth seed and eventual semi-finalist Hana Mandlíková.

== ITF finals ==
Legend
$25,000 tournaments
$10,000 tournaments

=== Doubles: 5 (4–1) ===
Outcome	No.	Date	Tournament	Surface	Partner	Opponents	Score
Runner-up	1.	22 February 1987	Denain, France	Clay	(France) Karine Quentrec	(Belgium) Kathleen Schuurmans (United States) Erika Smith	3–6, 2–6
Winner	1.	19 July 1987	Erlange, West Germany	Clay	(Czechoslovakia) Denisa Krajčovičová	(Australia) Alison Scott (Austria) Heidi Sprung	6–1, 6–2
Winner	2.	27 July 1987	Vaihingen, West Germany	Clay	(France) Julie Halard-Decugis	(Czechoslovakia) Hana Fukárková (Czechoslovakia) Denisa Krajčovičová	6–4, 6–3
Winner	3.	24 January 1988	Denain, France	Clay	(France) Karine Quentrec	(United States) Liz Burris (Republic of Ireland) Lesley O'Halloran	6–3, 6–1
Winner	4.	3 July 1988	Maglie, Italy	Clay	(France) Frédérique Martin	(Japan) Ei Iida (Indonesia) Yayuk Basuki	5–7, 6–2, 6–2

== Personal life ==
Her son is also a tennis player, Arthur Rinderknech. Her nephews are tennis player-coach Benjamin Balleret and his half-brother and current tour player Valentin Vacherot, both sons of Paquet's sister. Her niece is WTA Tour player Chloé Paquet.
