= Jane Young (tennis) =

Canadian tennis player

- Full name: Jane Young Cooper
- Country (sports): Canada
- Born: May 31, 1965 (age 60) Waterloo, Canada
- Prize money: $29,727

Singles
- Highest ranking: No. 181 (2 February 1987)

Grand Slam singles results
- US Open: 2R (1985)

Doubles
- Highest ranking: No. 238 (12 December 1986)

Jane Young Cooper (born 31 May 1965) is a former professional tennis player from Canada.

== Biography ==
Young grew up in Waterloo, Ontario and attended the University of Mississippi on a tennis scholarship.

She featured in the main draw of the 1985 US Open as a qualifier, defeating local player JoAnne Russell in the first round, before losing in the second round to Kate Gompert.

From 1985 to 1986 she represented the Canada Fed Cup team in a total of three ties. On debut in 1985 she beat Carina Karlsson to help Canada win a tie against Sweden, but couldn't defeat Csilla Bartos as Canada went down to Hungary in the second round of the competition. In 1986 she was used as a doubles player in Canada's second round loss to Austria. She and partner Jill Hetherington were beaten in a dead rubber by the Austrian pairing of Petra Huber and Judith Polz.

She later studied law at the University of Ottawa, graduating in 1995. Two years later she married husband Mark Cooper and now works as a Crown Attorney in the Waterloo region.

== ITF finals ==
=== Singles (1–1) ===
Outcome	Date	Tournament	Surface	Opponent	Score
Winner	20 July 1985	Midland, United States	Clay	(Canada) Karen Dewis	6–0, 2–6, 6–1
Runner-up	16 July 1989	Greensboro, United States	Clay	(United States) Tami Whitlinger	2–6, 5–7
