= Eva-Maria Schürhoff =

German tennis player

- ITF name: Eva-Maria Schuerhoff
- Country (sports): West Germany; Germany
- Born: 8 December 1969 (age 56) Bergneustadt, West Germany
- Prize money: $30,121

Singles
- Career titles: 5 ITF
- Highest ranking: No. 235 (31 July 1989)

Grand Slam singles results
- Australian Open: 1R (1990)

Doubles
- Career titles: 5 ITF
- Highest ranking: No. 200 (17 July 1989)

Grand Slam doubles results
- Australian Open: 1R (1990)

Eva-Maria Schneider (born Eva-Maria Schürhoff; 8 December 1969) is a German former professional tennis player.

Schürhoff, who grew up in Gummersbach, reached a best singles ranking of 235 in the world as a professional player, most notably qualifying for the main draw of the 1990 Australian Open.

While studying medicine at the University of Cologne she was a two-time Universiade bronze medalist for Germany in doubles. She also played college tennis for the University of Arizona as a transfer student.

== ITF finals ==
=== Singles: 7 (5–2) ===
| Result | No. | Date | Tournament | Surface | Opponent | Score |
|---|---|---|---|---|---|---|
| Loss | 1. | 18 July 1988 | ITF Rheda, West Germany | Clay | (Czechoslovakia) Hana Fukárková | 2–6, 5–7 |
| Win | 1. | 3 April 1989 | ITF Bari, Italy | Clay | (Bulgaria) Magdalena Maleeva | 2–6, 6–1, 7–6^{(5)} |
| Win | 2. | 17 April 1989 | ITF Dubrovnik, Yugoslavia | Clay | (Hungary) Réka Szikszay | 7–6, 6–4 |
| Win | 3. | 12 August 1991 | ITF Munich, Germany | Clay | (Soviet Union) Irina Zvereva | 6–4, 6–2 |
| Loss | 2. | 5 August 1991 | ITF Paderborn, Germany | Clay | (Germany) Meike Babel | 3–6, 6–7 |
| Win | 4. | 2 September 1991 | ITF Bad Nauheim, Germany | Clay | (Germany) Andrea Glass | 6–2, 6–1 |
| Win | 5. | 10 August 1992 | ITF Munich, Germany | Clay | (Germany) Caroline Schneider | 6–3, 6–4 |

=== Doubles: 7 (5–2) ===
| Result | No. | Date | Tournament | Surface | Partner | Opponents | Score |
|---|---|---|---|---|---|---|---|
| Win | 1. | 4 August 1986 | ITF Rheda, West Germany | Clay | (West Germany) Martina Pawlik | (United States) Vicki Beggs (West Germany) Cornelia Dries | 6–3, 6–3 |
| Win | 2. | 16 November 1987 | ITF Wels, Austria | Hard | (Austria) Petra Schwarz | (Austria) Petra Hentschl (Austria) Barbara Paulus | 6–4, 6–4 |
| Loss | 1. | 8 August 1988 | ITF Darmstadt, West Germany | Clay | (South Africa) Nelia Kruger | (Czechoslovakia) Nora Bajčíková (Czechoslovakia) Petra Holubová | 7–5, 3–6, 3–6 |
| Win | 3. | 21 November 1988 | ITF Pforzheim, West Germany | Carpet (i) | (West Germany) Vera-Carina Elter | (Hungary) Andrea Noszály (West Germany) Anouschka Popp | 6–4, 7–5 |
| Loss | 2. | 9 April 1989 | ITF Bari, Italy | Clay | (Hungary) Andrea Noszály | (Austria) Marion Maruska (Bulgaria) Elena Pampoulova | w/o |
| Win | 4. | 2 September 1991 | ITF Bad Nauheim, Germany | Clay | (Czechoslovakia) Hana Adámková | (Poland) Katharzyna Teodorowicz (Poland) Agata Werblińska | 7–6, 6–2 |
| Win | 5. | 17 August 1992 | ITF Kaiserslautern, Germany | Clay | (Germany) Henrike Kadzidroga | (Germany) Saskia Zink (Hungary) Virág Csurgó | 2–6, 7–5, 6–3 |
