= Frédérique Martin =

French former professional tennis player (born 1969)

- Country (sports): France
- Born: 28 January 1969 (age 57)
- Prize money: $11,959

Singles
- Career record: 26–37
- Highest ranking: No. 322 (27 March 1989)

Grand Slam singles results
- French Open: Q2 (1987)

Doubles
- Career record: 27–28
- Career titles: 2 ITF
- Highest ranking: No. 107 (8 May 1989)

Grand Slam doubles results
- French Open: 1R (1987)

Grand Slam mixed doubles results
- French Open: 1R (1987)

Frédérique Martin (born 28 January 1969) is a French former professional tennis player.

While competing on the professional tour in the late 1980s, Martin reached career-high rankings of 322 in singles and 107 in doubles. She featured in the women's doubles and mixed doubles main draws of the 1987 French Open. Her best performance on the WTA Tour was a semi-final appearance in doubles at the 1988 Athens Trophy.

Martin now works as a naturopath.

== ITF finals ==
Legend
$25,000 tournaments
$10,000 tournaments

=== Doubles: 3 (2–1) ===
Result	No.	Date	Tournament	Surface	Partner	Opponents	Score
Loss	1.	20 July 1986	Paliano, Italy	Clay	(Switzerland) Cristina Casini	(Italy) Laura Murgo (Italy) Patrizia Murgo	3–6, 6–4, 3–6
Win	1.	20 April 1987	Queens, United Kingdom	Hard	(United Kingdom) Jo Louis	(Belgium) Ilse de Ruysscher (United Kingdom) Valda Lake	6–1, 5–7, 6–4
Win	2.	3 July 1988	Maglie, Italy	Clay	(France) Virginie Paquet	(Japan) Ei Iida (Indonesia) Yayuk Basuki	5–7, 6–2, 6–2
