= Hellas ter Riet =

Dutch tennis player

- Full name: Hellas ter Riet
- Country (sports): Netherlands
- Born: 21 June 1968 (age 57) Apeldoorn, Netherlands
- Height: 1.74 m (5 ft 8 1/2 in)
- Turned pro: April 1985
- Plays: Right-handed
- Prize money: $100,675

Singles
- Career record: 131–106
- Highest ranking: No. 110 (4 July 1988)

Grand Slam singles results
- Australian Open: 2R (1988)
- French Open: 2R (1988)

Doubles
- Career record: 50–73
- Highest ranking: No. 98 (13 May 1991)

Grand Slam doubles results
- Australian Open: 2R (1988)
- French Open: 1R (1987, 1990, 1991)
- Wimbledon: 1R (1990, 1991)
- US Open: 1R (1990)

Hellas ter Riet (born 21 June 1968) is a former professional tennis player from the Netherlands.

== Biography ==
=== Tennis career ===
In 1986, ter Riet made her Federation Cup debut, appearing in four ties for the Netherlands. In her first match, against Canada, she won her singles rubber over Helen Kelesi, but lost the deciding doubles rubber to surrender the tie. She won all her singles matches in the consolation rounds, including over the USSR's Natalia Zvereva.

She made the second round of both the Australian Open and French Open in 1988. At the Australian Open she lost to fifth seed Hana Mandlíková, then at the French Open had to retire hurt with illness in the second set against Martina Navratilova.

Her best performance on the WTA Tour was a quarter-final appearance at Guarujá in 1989.

=== Personal life ===
She married former world number one doubles player Jacco Eltingh in 1997 and the following year gave birth to her first child.

== ITF Circuit finals ==
=== Singles: 4 (2–2) ===
$100,000 tournaments
$75,000 tournaments
$50,000 tournaments
$25,000 tournaments
$10,000 tournaments

Outcome	No.	Date	Tournament	Surface	Opponent	Score
Runner-up	1.	29 July 1985	Neumünster, West Germany	Clay	(Italy) Barbara Romanò	3–6, 6–0, 5–7
Winner	2.	16 September 1985	Llorca, Spain	Clay	(Argentina) Andrea Tiezzi	2–6, 6–1, 6–3
Winner	3.	12 May 1986	Lee-on-the-Solent, United Kingdom	Clay	(Australia) Michelle Jaggard-Lai	6–3, 6–3
Runner-up	4.	3 July 1989	Cava de' Tirreni, Italy	Clay	(West Germany) Veronika Martinek	3–6, 4–6

=== Doubles: 6 (2-4) ===
Outcome	No	Date	Tournament	Surface	Partner	Opponents in the final	Score
Runner-up	1.	12 May 1986	Lee-on-the-Solent, United Kingdom	Clay	(France) Emmanuelle Derly	(Netherlands) Carin Bakkum (Netherlands) Nicole Muns-Jagerman	6–7, 6–3, 1–6
Runner-up	2.	11 April 1988	Caserta, Italy	Clay	(Czechoslovakia) Olga Votavová	(United States) Jennifer Fuchs (Sweden) Maria Strandlund	6–2, 3–6, 1–6
Winner	3.	18 April 1988	Reggio Emilia, Italy	Clay	(United States) Jennifer Fuchs	(Switzerland) Michèle Strebel (Brazil) Luciana Tella	6–0, 6–4
Runner-up	4.	11 February 1991	Key Biscayne, United States	Hard	(Canada) Rene Simpson	(United States) Penny Barg (United Kingdom) Samantha Smith	5–7, 2–6
Winner	5.	21 October 1991	Freeport, Bahamas	Hard	(Greece) Christina Zachariadou	(Netherlands) Aafje Evers (Netherlands) Yvonne Klompenhouver	3–6, 6–4, 6–2
Runner-up	6.	1 June 1992	Key Biscayne, United States	Hard	(Peru) Gianfranca Devercelli	(Canada) Jillian Alexander-Brower (United States) Niurka Sodupe	2–6, 4–6
