= Niurka Sodupe =

American tennis player (born 1969)

- Full name: Niurka Sodupe
- Country (sports): United States
- Born: April 19, 1969 (age 56)
- Prize money: $59,381

Singles
- Career record: 73–81
- Highest ranking: No. 108 (June 9, 1986)

Grand Slam singles results
- French Open: 2R (1986)
- Wimbledon: 1R (1986)
- US Open: 1R (1986)

Doubles
- Career record: 29–50
- Highest ranking: No. 125 (September 28, 1987)

Grand Slam doubles results
- French Open: 2R (1987)
- Wimbledon: 1R (1987)
- US Open: 1R (1985, 1986)

Niurka Sodupe (born April 19, 1969) is a former professional tennis player from the United States.

== Biography ==
Sodupe, the daughter of Cuban immigrants, went to Coral Gables Senior High School in Coral Gables, Florida.

At the age of 15, she was runner-up to Katerina Maleeva in the girls' singles final at the 1984 US Open. She competed in the juniors again at the US Open the following year and had a win over Mary Joe Fernández.

She made her WTA main draw debut as a wildcard at the 1985 Lynda Carter Maybelline Classic, where she had a first-round win over eighth-seed Gigi Fernández.

Her career best ranking of 108 in the world was attained in the 1986 season.

In 1987, she made WTA Tour quarterfinals at the Puerto Rico Open and the Virginia Slims of Arkansas.

She is now the director and head coach of Tennis Advantage of Miami.
