= Petra Keppeler =

German tennis player

- Full name: Petra Feucht (nee Keppeler)
- Country (sports): West Germany
- Born: 22 March 1965 (age 61) Augsburg, West Germany
- Prize money: $65,217

Singles
- Career record: 25–38

Grand Slam singles results
- Australian Open: 2R (1984)
- French Open: 4R (1984)
- Wimbledon: 1R (1985)
- US Open: 2R (1984, 1985)

Doubles
- Career record: 11–15
- Career titles: 1 WTA

Grand Slam doubles results
- French Open: 1R (1986)
- US Open: 1R (1984)

Petra Feucht (born 22 March 1965), born Petra Keppeler, is a former professional tennis player from Germany.

== Biography ==
=== Tennis career ===
Born in Augsburg, Keppeler played professionally in the 1980s.

Keppeler featured in a total of nine Federation Cup ties for West Germany, which included a semi-final win over Switzerland in 1983.

As a qualifier she made the fourth round of the 1984 French Open, before her run was ended by third seed Hana Mandlíková, in a match which went to three sets.

She was a semi-finalist at Bregenz in 1985. The following year, she won the doubles title there with Austrian player Petra Huber.

At the age of 22 she retired from tennis to pursue other interests and now works as a tax consultant in Augsburg-Firnhaberau.

=== Personal life ===
She is now known as Petra Feucht, through her marriage to Gregor, a general practitioner. The couple have two children, a son and daughter. Their son, Michael, plays collegiate tennis for the Lamar Cardinals.

== WTA Tour finals ==
=== Doubles (1-1) ===
Result	Date	Tournament	Tier	Surface	Partner	Opponents	Score
Loss	May, 1986	Barcelona, Spain	$50,000	Clay	(Austria) Petra Huber	(Czechoslovakia) Iva Budařová (France) Catherine Tanvier	2–6, 1–6
Win	July, 1986	Bregenz, Austria	$50,000	Clay	(Austria) Petra Huber	(Socialist Federal Republic of Yugoslavia) Sabrina Goleš (Denmark) Tine Scheuer-Larsen	6–2, 6–4

== ITF finals ==
=== Doubles (1-0) ===
Result	No.	Date	Tournament	Surface	Partner	Opponents	Score
Win	1.	16 April 1984	Monviso, Italy	Clay	(West Germany) Cornelia Lechner	(Australia) Annette Gulley (Austria) Andrea Pesak	2–6, 6–4, 6–3
