= Cornelia Lechner =

German tennis player

- Country (sports): West Germany
- Born: 13 November 1966 (age 58)
- Prize money: $27,403

Singles
- Highest ranking: No. 190 (21 December 1986)

Grand Slam singles results
- French Open: Q2 (1987)

Doubles
- Highest ranking: No. 229 (21 December 1986)

Cornelia Lechner (born 13 November 1966) is a German former professional tennis player.

Lechner competed on the professional tennis tour in the 1980s and reached a career best ranking of 190 in the world. She made her debut in a Virginia Slims main draw while touring Japan in 1983, featuring in both the Borden Classic and Japan Open. On the ITF circuit, she won a singles title at Rheda-Wiedenbrück in 1986 and two doubles titles.

== ITF finals ==
=== Singles: 3 (1–2) ===
Result	No.	Date	Tournament	Surface	Opponent	Score
Loss	1.	27 October 1985	Albury, Australia	Grass	(Australia) Amanda Tobin-Dingwall	3–6, 2–6
Win	1.	4 August 1986	Rheda-Wiedenbrück, West Germany	Clay	(West Germany) Heike Thoms	6–1, 3–6, 6–2
Loss	2.	31 August 1987	Vilamoura, Portugal	Clay	(Switzerland) Emanuela Zardo	1–6, 3–6

=== Doubles: 2 (2–0) ===
Result	No.	Date	Tournament	Surface	Partner	Opponents	Score
Win	1.	16 April 1984	Verona, Italy	Clay	(West Germany) Petra Keppeler	(Australia) Annette Gulley (Austria) Andrea Pesak	2–6, 6–4, 6–3
Win	2.	6 December 1986	Vereeniging, South Africa	Hard	(United States) Mary Dailey	(United Kingdom) Valda Lake (United Kingdom) Katie Rickett	6–4, 6–1
