= Karolina Karlsson =

Swedish tennis player

- Country (sports): Sweden
- Born: 27 May 1966 (age 58); Vingåker, Sweden
- Plays: Right-handed
- Prize money: $26,048

Singles
- Highest ranking: No. 136 (21 December 1986)

Grand Slam singles results
- French Open: 1R (1987)

Karolina Karlsson (born 27 May 1966) is a Swedish former professional tennis player.

== Biography ==
A right-handed player from Vingåker, Karlsson represented the Sweden Federation Cup team in a 1985 tie against South Korea, partnering Carina Karlsson in the doubles rubber.

Karlsson reached a best singles ranking of 136 in the world, with her best WTA Tour performance a quarter-final appearance at the Swedish Open Båstad in 1987, beating sixth seed Patricia Tarabini en route.

At the 1987 French Open she featured in the main draw as a lucky loser and lost her first round match in three sets to Italian qualifier Linda Ferrando.

== See also ==
- List of Sweden Fed Cup team representatives
