= Hana Fukárková =

Czech tennis player

- Country (sports): Czechoslovakia
- Born: 7 February 1964 (age 61)
- Retired: 1990
- Prize money: $47,936

Singles
- Career record: 73–65
- Career titles: 1 ITF
- Highest ranking: No. 168 (15 August 1988)

Grand Slam singles results
- French Open: 1R (1984, 1987)

Doubles
- Career record: 57–32
- Career titles: 10 ITF
- Highest ranking: No. 116 (21 December 1986)

Grand Slam doubles results
- French Open: 2R (1986)
- Wimbledon: Q1 (1986)

Hana Fukárková (born 7 February 1964) is a retired Czech tennis player.

== Tennis career ==
Fukárková's junior career included a runner-up finish at the 1981 Orange Bowl and a Wimbledon girls' doubles semi-final the following year.

On the professional tour, Fukárková twice qualified for the singles main draw of the French Open in 1984 and 1987, losing in the first round both times. In between those appearances, she reached the second round of the doubles at the 1986 French Open, partnering Jana Novotná. She made two WTA Tour quarterfinals during her career, at Paris in 1987 and Sofia in 1988. Her performance in Paris included a win over Arantxa Sánchez Vicario.

=== Personal ===
Fukárková now lives in Salzburg, Austria and works as a tennis coach.

== ITF finals ==
Legend
$25,000 tournaments
$10,000 tournaments

=== Singles (1–4) ===
Result	No.	Date	Tournament	Surface	Opponent	Score
Loss	1.	9 January 1984	ITF San Antonio, United States	Hard	(Sweden) Elizabeth Ekblom	2–6, 1–6
Loss	2.	23 September 1985	ITF Sofia, Bulgaria	Clay	(West Germany) Sabine Hack	1–6, 2–6
Loss	3.	21 July 1986	ITF Stuttgart, West Germany	Clay	(West Germany) Christina Singer-Bath	6–1, 1–6, 3–6
Loss	4.	27 June 1988	ITF Neumünster, West Germany	Clay	(Czechoslovakia) Leona Lásková	2–6, 4–6
Win	1.	18 July 1988	ITF Rheda, West Germany	Clay	(West Germany) Eva-Maria Schürhoff	6–2, 7–5

=== Doubles (10–5) ===
Result	No.	Date	Tournament	Surface	Partner	Opponents	Score
Win	1.	6 August 1984	ITF Subiaco, Italy	Clay	(Czechoslovakia) Lea Plchová	(Italy) Patrizia Murgo (Italy) Barbara Romanò	6–4, 2–6, 6–4
Loss	1.	29 July 1985	ITF Neumünster, West Germany	Hard	(Czechoslovakia) Olga Votavová	(Czechoslovakia) Yvona Brzáková (Czechoslovakia) Marie Pinterová	0–6, 5–7
Win	2.	5 August 1985	ITF Kitzbühel, Austria	Clay	(Czechoslovakia) Olga Votavová	(Czechoslovakia) Nora Bajčíková (Czechoslovakia) Petra Tesarová	7–5, 6–3
Loss	2.	23 September 1985	ITF Sofia, Bulgaria	Clay	(Czechoslovakia) Yvona Brzáková	(Bulgaria) Katerina Maleeva (Bulgaria) Manuela Maleeva	1–6, 2–6
Win	3.	3 March 1986	ITF Stockholm, Sweden	Clay	(Czechoslovakia) Jana Novotná	(West Germany) Silke Meier (West Germany) Claudia Porwik	6–4, 4–6, 6–3
Win	4.	14 April 1986	ITF Monviso, Italy	Clay	(Czechoslovakia) Jana Novotná	(Brazil) Gisele Miró (Netherlands) Karin van Essen	6–1, 6–2
Win	5.	21 April 1986	ITF Taranto, Italy	Clay	(Czechoslovakia) Jana Novotná	(Netherlands) Nanette Schutte (South Africa) Dianne Van Rensburg	7–5, 6–0
Win	6.	21 July 1986	ITF Stuttgart, West Germany	Clay	(Poland) Iwona Kuczyńska	(Sweden) Anneli Bjork (United Kingdom) Sarah Sullivan	7–5, 6–0
Win	7.	20 April 1987	ITF Monviso, Italy	Clay	(Poland) Iwona Kuczyńska	(Soviet Union) Aida Halatian (Soviet Union) Viktoria Milvidskaia	5–7, 3–6
Loss	3.	20 July 1987	ITF Stuttgart, West Germany	Clay	(Czechoslovakia) Denisa Krajčovičová	(France) Julie Halard-Decugis (France) Virginie Paquet	4–6, 3–6
Win	8.	3 August 1987	ITF Rheda, West Germany	Clay	(Czechoslovakia) Jana Pospíšilová	(Czechoslovakia) Nora Bajčíková (Czechoslovakia) Denisa Krajčovičová	6–2, 6–0
Win	9.	20 August 1987	ITF Darmstadt, West Germany	Clay	(Czechoslovakia) Jana Pospíšilová	(Czechoslovakia) Nora Bajčíková (Czechoslovakia) Denisa Krajčovičová	6–3, 6–0
Loss	4.	27 June 1988	ITF Neumünster, West Germany	Clay	(Czechoslovakia) Petra Langrová	(Hungary) Antonia Homolya (West Germany) Henrike Kadzidroga	1–6, 2–6
Win	10.	14 August 1989	ITF Budapest, Hungary	Clay	(Czechoslovakia) Denisa Krajčovičová	(Finland) Nanne Dahlman (West Germany) Silke Frankl	4–6, 6–3, 6–3
Loss	5.	26 February 1990	ITF Wels, Austria	Clay	(Czechoslovakia) Denisa Krajčovičová	(France) Alexia Dechaume-Balleret (France) Pascale Paradis	3–6, 2–6
