= Gisele Miró =

Brazilian tennis player

- Country (sports): Brazil
- Born: 1 November 1968 (age 56); Curitiba, Brazil
- Height: 170 cm (5 ft 7 in)
- Prize money: $66,150

Singles
- Career record: 59–67
- Career titles: 2 ITF
- Highest ranking: No. 99 (25 April 1988)

Grand Slam singles results
- Australian Open: 1R (1989)
- French Open: 1R (1988, 1987)
- Wimbledon: 2R (1989)

Doubles
- Career record: 30–36
- Career titles: 1 ITF
- Highest ranking: No. 108 (21 November 1988)

Grand Slam doubles results
- Australian Open: 1R (1989)
- Wimbledon: 1R (1986, 1988)
Medal record
yes
Representing Brazil
Women's Tennis
Pan American Games
Gold medal – first place	1987 Indianapolis	Women's Singles

Gisele Miró (born November 1, 1968) is a former tennis player from Brazil.

Miró competed for her native country at the 1988 Summer Olympics in Seoul. She won two singles and one doubles titles in the ITF Women's Circuit, and reached her highest individual ranking on the WTA Tour on April 25, 1988, when she became the No. 99 of the world.

== ITF finals ==
Legend
$50,000 tournaments
$25,000 tournaments
$10,000 tournaments

=== Singles (2–0) ===
Outcome	No.	Date	Tournament	Surface	Opponent	Score
Winner	1.	7 April 1986	ITF Caserta, Italy	Clay	(West Germany) Wiltrud Probst	6–3, 2–6, 6–3
Winner	2.	13 August 1990	ITF Brasília, Brazil	Clay	(Brazil) Sabrina Giusto	6–1, 6–0

=== Doubles (1–2) ===
Outcome	No.	Date	Tournament	Surface	Partner	Opponents	Score
Winner	1.	7 April 1986	ITF Caserta, Italy	Clay	(Argentina) Bettina Fulco	(Germany) Wiltrud Probst (Netherlands) Marianne van der Torre	6–3, 6–3
Runner-up	2.	14 April 1986	ITF Monte Viso, Italy	Clay	(Netherlands) Karin van Essen	(Czechoslovakia) Hana Fukárková (Czechoslovakia) Jana Novotná	1–6, 2–6
Runner-up	3.	4 October 2008	ITF Curitiba, Brazil	Clay	(Brazil) Isabela Miró	(Colombia) Karen Castiblanco (Argentina) Aranza Salut	6–1, 2–6, [8–10]
