= Cecilia Dahlman =

Swedish tennis player

- Country (sports): Sweden
- Born: 24 July 1968 (age 57) Lund, Sweden
- Height: 1.78 m (5 ft 10 in)
- Plays: Right-handed (two-handed backhand)
- Prize money: $194,938

Singles
- Career record: 160–120
- Career titles: 2
- Highest ranking: No. 63 (23 July 1990)

Grand Slam singles results
- Australian Open: 2R (1990)
- French Open: 1R (1990, 1991, 1993)
- Wimbledon: 2R (1990)
- US Open: 1R (1990, 1991)

Doubles
- Career record: 30–36
- Career titles: 0
- Highest ranking: No. 95 (23 April 1990)

Grand Slam doubles results
- Australian Open: 1R (1989, 1990)
- French Open: 1R (1989)

Cecilia Dahlman (born 24 July 1968) is a retired Swedish tennis player, who played professionally between mid 1980s and 1993.

== Tennis career ==
Cecilia Dahlman won two WTA singles titles during her career, the Athens Open in 1989 and 1990. She also represented Sweden in the Fed Cup.

== WTA Tour finals ==
=== Singles 2 ===
Legend
Grand Slam	0
WTA Championships	0
Tier I	0
Tier II	0
Tier III	0
Tier IV & V	2

Result	W-L	Date	Tournament	Surface	Opponent	Score
Win	1–0	Sep 1989	Athens Trophy, Greece	Clay	(Australia) Rachel McQuillan	3–6, 6–1. 5–7
Win	2–0	Sep 1990	Athens Trophy, Greece	Clay	(Italy) Katia Piccolini	7–5, 7–5

== ITF finals ==
=== Singles finals: (4-5) ===
$100,000 tournaments
$75,000 tournaments
$50,000 tournaments
$25,000 tournaments
$10,000 tournaments

Result	No.	Date	Tournament	Surface	Opponent	Score
Win	1.	28 October 1985	Peterborough, United Kingdom	Hard	(Czechoslovakia) Nora Bajčíková	7–5, 6–2
Win	2.	11 November 1985	London, United Kingdom	Hard	(Netherlands) Nicole Muns-Jagerman	2–6, 6–4, 6–1
Win	3.	4 May 1986	Sutton, United Kingdom	Clay	(Soviet Union) Natasha Zvereva	6–2, 3–6, 6–0
Loss	4.	3 November 1986	London, United Kingdom	Grass	(Switzerland) Csilla Bartos-Cserepy	0–6, 6–3, 5–7
Loss	5.	12 January 1987	Helsinki, Finland	Carpet	(Czechoslovakia) Radka Zrubáková	2–6, 6–2, 0–6
Loss	6.	30 November 1987	Budapest, Hungary	Clay	(Sweden) Catrin Jexell	2–6, 2–6
Win	7.	3 October 1988	Eastbourne, United Kingdom	Hard (i)	(Netherlands) Carin Bakkum	7–6, 6–0
Loss	8.	10 October 1988	Telford, United Kingdom	Hard (i)	(United Kingdom) Amanda Grunfeld	3–6, 6–7
Loss	9.	21 October 1991	Swindon, United Kingdom	Carpet	(Belgium) Els Callens	6–3, 5–7, 4–6

=== Doubles finals (1-2) ===
Result	No.	Date	Tournament	Surface	Partner	Opponents	Score
Win	1.	12 January 1987	Helsinki, Finland	Carpet	(Finland) Laura Maennistoe	(Czechoslovakia) Denisa Krajčovičová (Czechoslovakia) Radka Zrubáková	6–7, 7–6^{(0)}, 7–6^{(5)}
Loss	2.	5 September 1988	Porto, Portugal	Clay	(Sweden) Helena Dahlström	(Switzerland) Sandrine Jaquet (West Germany) Martina Pawlik	3–6, 1–6
Loss	3.	20 January 1992	Bergen, Norway	Carpet (i)	(Norway) Amy Jönsson Raaholt	(Sweden) Catarina Bernstein (Sweden) Annika Narbe	1–6, 4–6
