= Jamie Golder =

American tennis player

- Country (sports): United States
- Born: February 21, 1962 (age 64) Philadelphia, Pennslyvania
- College: University of Miami
- Prize money: $64,829

Singles
- Career record: 31–68

Grand Slam singles results
- Australian Open: 2R (1987)
- French Open: 2R (1984)
- Wimbledon: 1R (1983, 1984)
- US Open: 2R (1984)

Doubles
- Career record: 13–41

Grand Slam doubles results
- Australian Open: 1R (1988)
- French Open: 1R (1984, 1985, 1986, 1987)
- Wimbledon: 1R (1985, 1986)
- US Open: 1R (1985)
Medal record
Maccabiah Games
Silver medal – second place	1985 Israel	Women's singles

Jamie Golder (born February 21, 1962) is an American former professional tennis player.

== Biography ==
Born in Philadelphia, Golder played college tennis for the University of Miami before joining the professional tour.

During her professional career she featured in the main draw of all four grand slam tournaments, most notably at the 1984 French Open, where she had an opening round win over fourth seed Andrea Jaeger, who retired hurt after losing the first set 5–7.

Golder won a silver medal behind Ronni Reis in the women's singles event at the 1985 Maccabiah Games in Israel.

She was the second wife of actor and comedian Art Metrano.
