= Angeliki Kanellopoulou =

Greek tennis player (born 1965)

Angeliki Kanellopoulou-Sakkari
- Country (sports): Greece
- Born: 18 December 1965 (age 60) Athens, Greece
- Plays: Right-handed
- Prize money: US$176,380

Singles
- Career record: 85–94
- Career titles: 0
- Highest ranking: No. 43 (13 April 1987)

Grand Slam singles results
- French Open: 3R (1985, 1987)
- Wimbledon: 1R (1986)
- US Open: 2R (1989)

Other tournaments
- Olympic Games: QF (1984)

Doubles
- Career record: 13–39
- Career titles: 0
- Highest ranking: No. 150 (25 June 1990)

Grand Slam doubles results
- French Open: 1R (1985)
- US Open: 1R (1985)

Team competitions
- Fed Cup: 15–28
Medal record
Mediterranean Games
Gold medal – first place	1987 Latakia	Women's Doubles
Silver medal – second place	1987 Latakia	Women's Singles

Angeliki Kanellopoulou (Greek: Αγγελική Κανελλοπούλου; born 18 December 1965) is a Greek former tennis player who competed on the WTA Tour. She reached a career-high ranking of No. 43 in April 1987. During her career, she twice reached the third round of the French Open. She competed in the Federation Cup multiple times and participated in the tennis demonstration in the 1984 Summer Olympics, reaching the quarterfinals. Another career highlight was reaching the finals of the 1986 Athens Trophy, where she lost to Sylvia Hanika.

She was named the Greek Female Athlete of the Year for 1980 and 1985.

Kanellopoulou is the mother of professional tennis player Maria Sakkari.

== WTA career finals ==
=== Singles: 1 (0–1) ===
Winner — Legend Grand Slam tournaments (0–0) WTA Tour Championships (0–0) Tier I (0–0) Tier II (0–0) Tier III (0–0) Tier IV (0–0) Tier V (0–0) Virginia Slims, Avon, Other (0–1)	Titles by surface Hard (0–0) Grass (0–0) Clay (0–1) Carpet (0–0)

Result	W–L	Date	Tournament	Surface	Opponent	Score
Loss	0–1	Sep 1986	Athens, Greece	Clay	(West Germany) Sylvia Hanika	5–7, 1–6

== ITF finals ==
=== Singles (2–0) ===
$10,000 tournaments

Result	No	Date	Tournament	Surface	Opponent	Score
Win	1.	22 August 1982	Lausanne, Switzerland	Clay	(Switzerland) Christiane Jolissaint	6–4, 6–7, 6–1
Win	2.	1 August 1983	Cava de' Tirreni, Italy	Clay	(Italy) Federica Bonsignori	6–1, 7–6

=== Doubles (0–1) ===
Result	No	Date	Tournament	Surface	Partner	Opponents	Score
Loss	1.	2 August 1982	Pesaro, Italy	Hard	(Greece) Denise Panagopoulou	(Australia) Debbie Freeman (South Korea) Park Mal-sim	7–5, 3–6, 0–6
