= Lisa O'Neill (tennis) =

Australian tennis player

- Country (sports): Australia
- Born: 8 August 1968 (age 58)
- Prize money: $71,691

Singles
- Career record: 77–98
- Highest ranking: No. 145 (4 July 1988)

Grand Slam singles results
- Australian Open: 3R (1989)
- Wimbledon: 2R (1988)

Doubles
- Career record: 54–80
- Highest ranking: No. 123 (20 November 1989)

Grand Slam doubles results
- Australian Open: 1R (1988, 1989, 1990)
- French Open: 1R (1987, 1989)
- Wimbledon: 2R (1989)

Lisa O'Neill (born 8 August 1968 is a retired professional tennis player from Australia.

== ITF finals ==
=== Singles (1–2) ===
Legend
$25,000 tournaments
$10,000 tournaments

Result	No.	Date	Tournament	Surface	Opponent	Score
Loss	1.	10 March 1985	Melbourne, Australia	Hard	(Australia) Vicki Marler	1–6, 2–6
Loss	2.	13 November 1989	Adelaide, Australia	Hard	(New Zealand) Hana Guy	3–6, 3–6
Win	1.	14 March 1993	Wodonga, Australia	Grass	(Australia) Jane Taylor	6–2, 6–4

=== Doubles (3–0) ===
Result	No.	Date	Tournament	Surface	Partner	Opponents	Score
Win	1.	22 September 1985	Boston, United States	Hard	(Australia) Louise Field	(Australia) Colleen Carney (Australia) Michelle Turk	6–4, 6–1
Win	2.	31 October 1986	Sydney, Australia	Hard	(Australia) Michelle Jaggard-Lai	(Australia) Nicole Bradtke (Australia) Louise Field	w/o
Win	3.	6 March 1988	Canberra, Australia	Grass	(Australia) Janine Thompson	(Australia) Rachel McQuillan (Australia) Rennae Stubbs	6–3, 7–5
