= 1986 US Open – Women's singles qualifying =

Women's singles qualifying
- 1986 US Open

Events
Singles	men	women		boys	girls
Doubles	men	women	mixed	boys	girls
WC Singles	men	women	quad
WC Doubles	men	women	quad
Legends	men	women	mixed

Qualification
Singles	men	women
- US Open

Players who neither had high enough rankings nor received wild cards to enter the main draw of the annual US Open Tennis Championships participated in a qualifying tournament held over several days before the event.

== Qualifiers ==
1. (United States) Leigh-Anne Eldredge
2. (United States) Penny Barg
3. (New Zealand) Julie Richardson
4. (United States) Kim Sands
5. (United States) Nicole Arendt
6. (United States) Deeann Hansel
7. (United States) Elly Hakami
8. (Australia) Susan Leo

== Lucky losers ==
1. (United States) Lea Antonoplis
2. (Argentina) Mariana Pérez Roldán

== Qualifying draw ==
Key

- Q = Qualifier
- WC = Wild card
- LL = Lucky loser
- Alt = Alternate
- ITF = ITF entry
- PR = Protected ranking
- SR = Special ranking
- SE = Special exempt
- JE = Junior exempt
- JR = Junior Accelerator Programme entrant
- CO = College Accelerator Programme entrant
- NG = Next Gen Accelerator Program entrant
- w/o = Walkover
- r = Retired
- d = Defaulted

=== First qualifier ===
First round
(Argentina) Patricia Tarabini	2	2
(United States) Renee Blount	6	6
(United States) Leigh-Anne Eldredge	7^{7}	6
(Sweden) Monica Lundqvist	6^{5}	1
(United States) Jane Holdren	1	2
(United States) Susan Rimes	6	6
(France) Sophie Amiach	6	6
(Sweden) Helena Dahlström	3	1

Second round
(United States) Renee Blount	3	5
(United States) Leigh-Anne Eldredge	6	7
(United States) Susan Rimes	7^{7}	7^{8}
(France) Sophie Amiach	6^{3}	6^{6}

Qualifying competition
(United States) Leigh-Anne Eldredge	6	7^{7}
(United States) Susan Rimes	2	6^{4}

=== Second qualifier ===
First round
(United States) Kerri Reiter	6^{2}	1
(United States) Jenni Goodling	7^{7}	6
(United States) Laura Bernstein	7	6
(United States) Melissa Brown	5	4
(United States) Chris Gillis	3	2
(United States) Penny Barg	6	6
(Japan) Kumiko Okamoto	6^{5}	6	4
(United States) Lisa Spain-Short	7^{7}	4	6

Second round
(United States) Jenni Goodling	6	5	0
(United States) Laura Bernstein	2	7	6
(United States) Penny Barg	6	6
(United States) Lisa Spain-Short	2	4

Qualifying competition
(United States) Laura Bernstein	6	6^{5}	4
(United States) Penny Barg	4	7^{7}	6

=== Third qualifier ===
First round
(Argentina) Mariana Pérez Roldán	6	6
(United States) Amy Schwartz	4	2
(United States) Trisha Laux	6	6
(Sweden) Karolina Karlsson	4	3
(New Zealand) Julie Richardson	6	7^{7}
(United States) Halle Cioffi	2	6^{5}
(United States) Andrea Leand	7	3	3
(New Zealand) Belinda Cordwell	5	6	6

Second round
(Argentina) Mariana Pérez Roldán	3	6	6
(United States) Trisha Laux	6	2	4
(New Zealand) Julie Richardson	7^{7}	6
(New Zealand) Belinda Cordwell	6^{3}	3

Qualifying competition
(Argentina) Mariana Pérez Roldán	6	0	4
(New Zealand) Julie Richardson	3	6	6

=== Fourth qualifier ===
First round
(Australia) Nicole Bradtke	6	6
(Poland) Renata Baranski	3	0
(United States) Louise Allen	4	6	6
(Japan) Akemi Nishiya	6	3	1
(United States) Sandy Collins	6	6
(Czechoslovakia) Marcela Skuherská	1	1
(Sweden) Catrin Jexell	4	2
(United States) Kim Sands	6	6

Second round
(Australia) Nicole Bradtke	4	1
(United States) Louise Allen	6	6
(United States) Sandy Collins	6^{4}	3
(United States) Kim Sands	7^{7}	6

Qualifying competition
(United States) Louise Allen	3	7^{7}	4
(United States) Kim Sands	6	6^{4}	6

=== Fifth qualifier ===
First round
(United States) Beth Norton	4	2
(United States) Nicole Arendt	6	6
(United States) Barbara Jordan	4	7^{7}	3
(United States) Cathy Hofer	6	6^{5}	6
(West Germany) Wiltrud Probst	6	6
(Australia) Rebecca Bryant	2	4
(United States) Kay McDaniel	6	7^{7}
(Japan) Akiko Kijimuta	2	6^{2}

Second round
(United States) Nicole Arendt	6	6
(United States) Cathy Hofer	4	2
(West Germany) Wiltrud Probst	3	6	6
(United States) Kay McDaniel	6	4	4

Qualifying competition
(United States) Nicole Arendt	4	6	6
(West Germany) Wiltrud Probst	6	4	2

=== Sixth qualifier ===
First round
(Sweden) Maria Lindström	3	2
(United Kingdom) Monique Javer	6	6
(United States) Micki Schillig	7	2	1
(United States) Deeann Hansel	5	6	6
(Mexico) Heliane Steden	6	6
(United States) Caryn Copeland	1	4
(Australia) Michelle Jaggard-Lai	3	6	4
(West Germany) Silke Meier	6	3	6

Second round
(United Kingdom) Monique Javer	2	1
(United States) Deeann Hansel	6	6
(Mexico) Heliane Steden	2	6	6
(West Germany) Silke Meier	6	3	3

Qualifying competition
(United States) Deeann Hansel	6	6
(Mexico) Heliane Steden	4	0

=== Seventh qualifier ===
First round
(United States) Lea Antonoplis	6	6
(France) Corinne Vanier	3	1
(Czechoslovakia) Jana Novotná	6	4	6
(West Germany) Sabine Hack	0	6	3
(United States) Jenny Klitch	4	3
(United States) Elly Hakami	6	6
(United States) Stephanie London	4	6^{0}
(United States) Cecilia Fernandez-Parker	6	7^{7}

Second round
(United States) Lea Antonoplis	7	6
(Czechoslovakia) Jana Novotná	5	3
(United States) Elly Hakami	6	6
(United States) Cecilia Fernandez-Parker	3	4

Qualifying competition
(United States) Lea Antonoplis	7^{7}	2	0
(United States) Elly Hakami	6^{5}	6	6

=== Eighth qualifier ===
First round
(Argentina) Bettina Fulco	6	1	6
(United States) Kim Steinmetz	1	6	4
(Australia) Susan Leo	6	6
(United States) Leslie Allen	3	2
(United States) Jane Forman	6	7
(United States) Diane Farrell	3	5
(Peru) Pilar Vásquez	5	7	6
(United States) Amy Holton	7	5	4

Second round
(Argentina) Bettina Fulco	5	6	2
(Australia) Susan Leo	7	1	6
(United States) Jane Forman	6	3	6
(Peru) Pilar Vásquez	2	6	3

Qualifying competition
(Australia) Susan Leo	7	6
(United States) Jane Forman	5	3
