= 1985 in tennis =

This page covers all the important events in the sport of tennis in 1985. It provides the results of notable tournaments throughout the year on both the men's and the women's tennis circuits, the Davis Cup, and the Federation Cup.

== Australian Open ==
Category	Champion(s)	Finalist(s)	Score
Men's singles	(Sweden) Stefan Edberg	(Sweden) Mats Wilander	6–4, 6–3, 6–3 (Note: It was Edberg's 1st career Grand Slam singles title.)
Women's singles	(United States) Martina Navratilova	(United States) Chris Evert	6–2, 4–6, 6–2 (Note: It was Navratilova's 13th career Grand Slam singles title and her 3rd and last title at the Australian Open.)
Men's doubles	(United States) Paul Annacone (South Africa) Christo van Rensburg	(Australia) Mark Edmondson (Australia) Kim Warwick	3–6, 7–6, 6–4, 6–4 (Note: It was Annacone's 1st and only career Grand Slam doubles title.) (Note: It was van Rensburg's 1st and only career Grand Slam doubles title.)
Women's doubles	(United States) Martina Navratilova (United States) Pam Shriver	(West Germany) Claudia Kohde-Kilsch (Czechoslovakia) Helena Suková	6–3, 6–4 (Note: It was Navratilova's 37th career Grand Slam title and her 8th Australian Open title. It was Shriver's 12th career Grand Slam title and her 4th Australian Open title.)
Mixed doubles	The competition was not held between 1970 and 1985.		

== French Open ==
Category	Champion(s)	Finalist(s)	Score
Men's singles	(Sweden) Mats Wilander	(Czechoslovakia) Ivan Lendl	3–6, 6–4, 6–2, 6–2 (Note: It was Wilander's 4th career Grand Slam title, and his 2nd French Open title.)
Women's singles	(United States) Chris Evert	(United States) Martina Navratilova	6–3, 6–7^{(4–7)}, 7–5 (Note: It was Evert's 17th career Grand Slam title, and her 6th French Open title.)
Men's doubles	(Australia) Mark Edmondson (Australia) Kim Warwick	(Israel) Schlomo Glickstein (Sweden) Hans Simonsson	6–3, 6–4, 6–7, 6–3
Women's doubles	(United States) Martina Navratilova (United States) Pam Shriver	(West Germany) Claudia Kohde-Kilsch (Czechoslovakia) Helena Suková	4–6, 6–2, 6–2
Mixed doubles	(United States) Martina Navratilova (Switzerland) Heinz Günthardt	(United States) Paula Smith (Paraguay) Francisco González	2–6, 6–3, 6–2

== Wimbledon ==
Category	Champion(s)	Finalist(s)	Score
Men's singles	(West Germany) Boris Becker	(United States) Kevin Curren	6–3, 6–7^{(4–7)}, 7–6^{(7–3)}, 6–4 (Note: It was Becker's 1st career Grand Slam title and his 1st Wimbledon title.)
Women's singles	(United States) Martina Navratilova	(United States) Chris Evert Lloyd	4–6, 6–3, 6–2 (Note: It was Navratilova's 33rd career Grand Slam title and her 6th Wimbledon singles title.)
Men's doubles	(Switzerland) Heinz Günthardt (Hungary) Balázs Taróczy	(Australia) Pat Cash (Australia) John Fitzgerald	6–4, 6–3, 4–6, 6–3 (Note: It was Günthardt's 3rd career Grand Slam title and his only Wimbledon title. It was Taróczy's 2nd and last career Grand Slam title and his only Wimbledon title.)
Women's doubles	(United States) Kathy Jordan (Australia) Elizabeth Smylie	(United States) Martina Navratilova (United States) Pam Shriver	5–7, 6–3, 6–4 (Note: It was Jordan's 5th career Grand Slam title and her 2nd Wimbledon title. It was Smylie's 2nd career Grand Slam title and her 1st Wimbledon title.)
Mixed doubles	(Australia) Paul McNamee (United States) Martina Navratilova	(Australia) John Fitzgerald (Australia) Elizabeth Smylie	7–5, 4–6, 6–2 (Note: It was McNamee's 5th and last career Grand Slam title and his 3rd Wimbledon title. It was Navratilova's 34th career Grand Slam title and her 13th Wimbledon title.)

== US Open ==
Category	Champion(s)	Finalist(s)	Score
Men's singles	(Czechoslovakia) Ivan Lendl	(United States) John McEnroe	7–6^{(7–1)}, 6–3, 6–4 (Note: It was Lendl's 2nd career Grand Slam title and his 1st US Open title.)
Women's singles	(Czechoslovakia) Hana Mandlíková	(United States) Martina Navratilova	7–6^{(7–3)}, 1–6, 7–6^{(7–2)} (Note: It was Mandlíková's 3rd career Grand Slam title and her 1st US Open title.)
Men's doubles	(United States) Ken Flach (United States) Robert Seguso	(France) Henri Leconte (France) Yannick Noah	6–7^{(5–7)}, 7–6^{(7–1)}, 7–6^{(8–6)}, 6–0 (Note: It was Flach's 1st career Grand Slam title and his 1st US Open title. It was Seguso's 1st career Grand Slam title and his only US Open title.)
Women's doubles	(West Germany) Claudia Kohde-Kilsch (Czechoslovakia) Helena Suková	(United States) Martina Navratilova (United States) Pam Shriver	6–7^{(5–7)}, 6–2, 6–3 (Note: It was Kohde-Kilsch's 1st career Grand Slam title and her only US Open title. It was Suková's 1st career Grand Slam title and her 1st US Open title.)
Mixed doubles	(United States) Martina Navratilova (Switzerland) Heinz Günthardt	(Australia) Elizabeth Smylie (Australia) John Fitzgerald	6–3, 6–4 (Note: It was Navratilova's 35th career Grand Slam title and her 8th US Open title. It was Günthardt's 4th and last career Grand Slam title and his only US Open title.)

== Davis Cup ==
First round 8–10 March
Kyoto, Japan (indoor carpet)
United States	5
Japan	0
Sindelfingen, West Germany (indoor carpet)
Spain	2
West Germany	3
Tbilisi, Soviet Union (indoor carpet)
Czechoslovakia	3
Soviet Union	2
Buenos Aires, Argentina (clay)
Argentina	1
Ecuador	4
Asunción, Paraguay (indoor carpet)
Paraguay	3
France	2
Split, Yugoslavia (indoor clay)
Yugoslavia	2
Australia	3
Calcutta, India (grass)
India	3
Italy	2
Santiago, Chile (clay) [19–21 April]
Chile	1
Sweden	4

Quarterfinals; 2–4 August
Hamburg, West Germany (clay)
United States	2
West Germany	3
Guayaquil, Ecuador (clay)
Czechoslovakia	5
Ecuador	0
Sydney, Australia (grass)
Paraguay	2
Australia	3
Bangalore, India (grass)
India	1
Sweden	4

Semifinals; 4–6 October
Frankfurt, West Germany (indoor carpet)
West Germany	5
Czechoslovakia	0
Malmö, Sweden (indoor clay)
Australia	0
Sweden	5

Final; 20–22 December
Munich, West Germany (indoor carpet)
West Germany	2
Sweden	3

== Federation Cup ==
First Round
Czechoslovakia	2
Greece	1
Netherlands	1
Switzerland	2
Q	Belgium	0
Hungary	3
Canada	2
Sweden	1
West Germany	0
Great Britain	3
Austria	0
Japan	3
Bulgaria	3
Soviet Union	0
Q	Ireland	0
Yugoslavia	3
United States	3
Q	South Korea	0
Brazil	1
Q	China	2
Argentina	3
Peru	0
New Zealand	2
France	1
Italy	3
Q	Chinese Taipei	0
Mexico	3
Q	Norway	0
Spain	2
Hong Kong	1
Denmark	0
Australia	3

Second Round
Czechoslovakia	2
Switzerland	1
Hungary	2
Canada	1
Great Britain	2
Japan	1
Bulgaria	3
Yugoslavia	0
United States	3
Q	China	0
Argentina	2
New Zealand	1
Italy	3
Mexico	0
Spain	0
Australia	3

Quarterfinals
Czechoslovakia	3
Hungary	0
Great Britain	1
Bulgaria	2
United States	2
Argentina	1
Italy	0
Australia	3

Semifinals
Czechoslovakia	2
Bulgaria	1
United States	2
Australia	1

Final
Czechoslovakia	2
United States	1
