= Cathy Hofer =

American tennis player

- Country (sports): United States
- Plays: Right-handed

Singles
- Highest ranking: No. 271 (December 21, 1986)

Grand Slam singles results
- US Open: Q2 (1986)

Cathy Hofer is an American former professional tennis player.

Hofer, a native of Aurora, Illinois, made her first main draw appearance on the Virginia Slims tour at the 1985 U.S. Clay Court Championships and the following year featured in the qualifying draw for the US Open.

From 1986 to 1989 she played tennis for Clemson University, where she earned All-American honors and was a two-time All-ACC. She was ACC Player of the Year in 1988 and is a 2016 inductee into the Clemson Athletic Hall of Fame.
