= Stephanie London =

American tennis player

- Full name: Stephanie London Krogius
- Country (sports): United States
- Born: August 18, 1969 (age 55)

Singles
- Highest ranking: No. 239 (March 30, 1987)

Grand Slam singles results
- US Open: Q1 (1986)

Doubles
- Highest ranking: No. 253 (March 30, 1987)

Grand Slam doubles results
- US Open: 1R (1985)

Stephanie London Krogius (born August 18, 1969) is an American former professional tennis player. She played collegiate tennis for the University of Southern California and was a three-time All-American.

London, a junior doubles finalist at the 1984 US Open, made her debut in the women's doubles main draw the following year, partnering Niurka Sodupe. While competing on the professional tour she reached a career high singles ranking of 239 in the world.

In the late 1990s she served as the women's tennis head coach at the University of Arizona.

== ITF finals ==
Legend
$25,000 tournaments
$10,000 tournaments

=== Singles: 1 (1–0) ===
Outcome	Date	Tournament	Surface	Opponent	Score
Winner	March 22, 1987	Tucson, United States	Hard	(United States) Cynthia MacGregor	6–2, 6–3

=== Doubles: 1 (0–1) ===
Outcome	Date	Tournament	Surface	Partner	Opponents	Score
Runner-up	July 27, 1986	Pittsburgh, United States	Hard	(United States) Ronni Reis	(United States) Deeann Hansel (United States) Gretchen Magers	1–6, 0–6
