= 1985 US Open – Men's doubles =

Men's doubles
- 1985 US Open

Final
- Champion: (United States) Ken Flach (United States) Robert Seguso
- Runner-up: (France) Henri Leconte (France) Yannick Noah
- Score: 6–7^{(5–7)}, 7–6^{(7–1)}, 7–6^{(8–6)}, 6–0

Details
- Draw: 64
- Seeds: 16

Events
Singles	men	women		boys	girls
Doubles	men	women	mixed	boys	girls
WC Singles	men	women	quad
WC Doubles	men	women	quad
Legends	men	women	mixed
← 1984 ·	US Open	· 1986 →

The men's doubles tournament at the US Open was held from August 27 to September 8, 1985, on the outdoor hard courts at the USTA National Tennis Center in New York City, United States. Ken Flach and Robert Seguso won the title, defeating Henri Leconte and Yannick Noah in the final.

== Seeds ==
1. (United States) Ken Flach / (United States) Robert Seguso (champions)
2. (Sweden) Stefan Edberg / (Sweden) Anders Järryd (second round)
3. (Switzerland) Heinz Günthardt / (Hungary) Balázs Taróczy (first round)
4. (Czechoslovakia) Pavel Složil / (Czechoslovakia) Tomáš Šmíd (first round)
5. (Sweden) Joakim Nyström / (Sweden) Mats Wilander (semifinals)
6. (Australia) Mark Edmondson / (Australia) Kim Warwick (third round)
7. (United States) Paul Annacone / (South Africa) Christo van Rensburg (third round)
8. (Australia) John Fitzgerald / (United States) Matt Mitchell (third round)
9. (Australia) Broderick Dyke / (Australia) Wally Masur (first round)
10. (Poland) Wojciech Fibak / (Czechoslovakia) Libor Pimek (second round)
11. (Australia) Peter McNamara / (Australia) Paul McNamee (third round)
12. (France) Henri Leconte / (France) Yannick Noah (final)
13. (Chile) Hans Gildemeister / (Paraguay) Víctor Pecci (second round)
14. (United States) Scott Davis / (United States) David Pate (third round)
15. (United States) Steve Denton / (United States) Peter Fleming (quarterfinals)
16. (United States) Kevin Curren / (United States) Johan Kriek (quarterfinals)

== Draw ==
=== Key ===
- Q = Qualifier
- WC = Wild card
- LL = Lucky loser
- Alt = Alternate
- ITF = ITF entry
- PR = Protected ranking
- SR = Special ranking
- SE = Special exempt
- JE = Junior exempt
- JR = Junior Accelerator Programme entrant
- CO = College Accelerator Programme entrant
- NG = Next Gen Accelerator Program entrant
- w/o = Walkover
- r = Retired
- d = Defaulted

=== Finals ===
Quarterfinals
1	(United States) Ken Flach (United States) Robert Seguso	6	7	6
(Denmark) Michael Mortensen (Sweden) Hans Simonsson	4	5	2
(United States) Mike De Palmer (United States) Gary Donnelly	6	7	4	7
16	(United States) Kevin Curren (United States) Johan Kriek	1	6	6	6
(United States) Andy Kohlberg (United States) Robert Van't Hof	6	6	7	6	6
12	(France) Henri Leconte (France) Yannick Noah	7	4	5	7	7
5	(Sweden) Joakim Nyström (Sweden) Mats Wilander	6	6	6
15	(United States) Steve Denton (United States) Peter Fleming	3	4	4

Semifinals
1	(United States) Ken Flach (United States) Robert Seguso	6	6	7	5	7
(United States) Mike De Palmer (United States) Gary Donnelly	1	7	5	7	6
12	(France) Henri Leconte (France) Yannick Noah	7	4	5	7	7
5	(Sweden) Joakim Nyström (Sweden) Mats Wilander	6	6	7	6	6

Final
1	(United States) Ken Flach (United States) Robert Seguso	6^{5}	7	7	6
12	(France) Henri Leconte (France) Yannick Noah	7	6^{1}	6^{6}	0

=== Top half ===
==== Section 1 ====
First round
1	(United States) K Flach (United States) R Seguso	6	6
(United States) C Garner (United States) B Papell	0	1
(United States) D Cassidy (Australia) D Graham	6	2	6
(Australia) P Doohan (United States) R Knapp	4	6	3
(South Africa) C Honey (South Africa) C Steyn	4	1
(United States) L Jensen (United States) P McEnroe	6	6
(India) A Amritraj (Australia) M Fancutt	6	3	4
11	(Australia) P McNamara (Australia) P McNamee	4	6	6
10	(Poland) W Fibak (Czechoslovakia) L Pimek	7	3	6
(United States) S McCain (Israel) S Perkiss	6	6	2
(Paraguay) F González (United States) J Lapidus	2	6	2
(Denmark) M Mortensen (Sweden) H Simonsson	6	2	6
(United States) M Bauer (United States) B Willenbourg	4	6	1
(United States) D Dowlen (Nigeria) N Odizor	6	3	6
(United States) R Baxter (United States) D Gitlin	3	6	3
8	(Australia) J Fitzgerald (United States) M Mitchell	6	3	6

Second round
1	(United States) K Flach (United States) R Seguso	6	6
(Australia) P Doohan (United States) R Knapp	4	3
(United States) L Jensen (United States) P McEnroe	4	6	3
11	(Australia) P McNamara (Australia) P McNamee	6	1	6
10	(Poland) W Fibak (Czechoslovakia) L Pimek	4	4
(Denmark) M Mortensen (Sweden) H Simonsson	6	6
(United States) D Dowlen (Nigeria) N Odizor	6	2	3
8	(Australia) J Fitzgerald (United States) M Mitchell	4	6	6

Third round
1	(United States) K Flach (United States) R Seguso	6	6	7
11	(Australia) P McNamara (Australia) P McNamee	4	7	6
(Denmark) M Mortensen (Sweden) H Simonsson	6	6	6
8	(Australia) J Fitzgerald (United States) M Mitchell	7	4	3

Quarterfinals
1	(United States) K Flach (United States) R Seguso	6	7	6
(Denmark) M Mortensen (Sweden) H Simonsson	4	5	2

==== Section 2 ====
First round
3	(Switzerland) H Günthardt (Hungary) B Taróczy	3	2
(United States) M De Palmer (United States) G Donnelly	6	6
(India) V Amritraj (United States) J Sadri	3	6	4
(United States) Ti Gullikson (United States) To Gullikson	6	3	6
(South Africa) E Edwards (South Africa) D Visser	6	4
(Chile) R Acuña (United States) E Fernandez	7	6
(Republic of Ireland) M Doyle (United States) R Meyer	6	3
13	(Chile) H Gildemeister (Paraguay) V Pecci	7	6
16	(United States) K Curren (United States) J Kriek	6	6
(United States) B Gilbert (United States) V Van Patten	3	2
(United States) T Giammalva (United States) B Manson	6	7
(United Kingdom) J Lloyd (United States) D Stockton	4	6
(Australia) J Alexander (United States) B Walts	6	6
(Brazil) G Barbosa (Brazil) I Kley	3	4
(United States) B Cox (United States) C Strode	1	4
6	(Australia) M Edmondson (Australia) K Warwick	6	6

Second round
(United States) M De Palmer (United States) G Donnelly	2	7	7
(United States) Ti Gullikson (United States) To Gullikson	6	6	6
(Chile) R Acuña (United States) E Fernandez	6	6
13	(Chile) H Gildemeister (Paraguay) V Pecci	4	4
16	(United States) K Curren (United States) J Kriek	7	6
(United States) T Giammalva (United States) B Manson	5	3
(Australia) J Alexander (United States) B Walts	6	6	1
6	(Australia) M Edmondson (Australia) K Warwick	7	3	6

Third round
(United States) M De Palmer (United States) G Donnelly	7	6
(Chile) R Acuña (United States) E Fernandez	6	2
16	(United States) K Curren (United States) J Kriek	6	7
6	(Australia) M Edmondson (Australia) K Warwick	0	5

Quarterfinals
(United States) M De Palmer (United States) G Donnelly	6	7	4	7
16	(United States) K Curren (United States) J Kriek	1	6	6	6

=== Bottom half ===
==== Section 3 ====
First round
7	(United States) P Annacone (South Africa) C van Rensburg	7	6
(United States) M Davis (United States) C Dunk	5	2
(New Zealand) K Evernden (South Africa) M Robertson	6	7	6
(United States) T Delatte (United States) M Purcell	7	5	4
(Romania) I Năstase (Czechoslovakia) J Navrátil	6	7	1
(United States) S Meister (United States) C Wittus	6	6	6
(United States) A Kohlberg (United States) R Van't Hof	6	7
9	(Australia) B Dyke (Australia) W Masur	1	6
12	(France) H Leconte (France) Y Noah	6	6
(Italy) P Canè (Italy) C Panatta	2	2
(Peru) C di Laura (United States) K Jones	3	2
(West Germany) B Becker (Socialist Federal Republic of Yugoslavia) S Živojinović	6	6
(Brazil) N Aerts (Brazil) J Soares	6	3	6
(Sweden) P Hjertquist (South Africa) D Tarr	3	6	2
(United States) C Hooper (United States) L Shiras	7	6
4	(Czechoslovakia) P Složil (Czechoslovakia) T Šmíd	5	2

Second round
7	(United States) P Annacone (South Africa) C van Rensburg	6	7
(New Zealand) K Evernden (South Africa) M Robertson	3	6
(United States) S Meister (United States) C Wittus	4	6
(United States) A Kohlberg (United States) R Van't Hof	6	7
12	(France) H Leconte (France) Y Noah	6	7	7
(West Germany) B Becker (Socialist Federal Republic of Yugoslavia) S Živojinović	7	6	6
(Brazil) N Aerts (Brazil) J Soares	6	3	6
(United States) C Hooper (United States) L Shiras	4	6	3

Third round
7	(United States) P Annacone (South Africa) C van Rensburg	3	6	4
(United States) A Kohlberg (United States) R Van't Hof	6	2	6
12	(France) H Leconte (France) Y Noah	7	7
(Brazil) N Aerts (Brazil) J Soares	5	6

Quarterfinals
7	(United States) A Kohlberg (United States) R Van't Hof	6	6	7	6	6
12	(France) H Leconte (France) Y Noah	7	4	5	7	7

==== Section 4 ====
First round
5	(Sweden) J Nyström (Sweden) M Wilander	6	6
(Finland) L Palin (Uruguay) D Pérez	3	1
(France) L Courteau (France) G Forget	6	6
(United States) D Goldie (United States) C Kennedy	3	3
(United States) B Dickinson (United States) J Manset	6	7
(United States) L Bourne (United States) M Freeman	4	6
(United States) E Adams (United States) M Wooldridge	4	7	4
14	(United States) S Davis (United States) D Pate	6	5	6
15	(United States) S Denton (United States) P Fleming	5	6	6
(Switzerland) J Hlasek (Brazil) C Motta	7	3	3
(United States) A Andrews (United States) G Layendecker	6	6
(United States) B Levine (United States) E Van't Hof	7	7
(United States) M Dickson (United States) T Wilkison	6	6
(United States) J Arias (United States) G Holmes	1	4
(United States) H Pfister (United States) B Testerman	5	1
2	(Sweden) S Edberg (Sweden) A Järryd	7	6

Second round
5	(Sweden) J Nyström (Sweden) M Wilander	6	7
(France) L Courteau (France) G Forget	3	6
(United States) B Dickinson (United States) J Manset	6	3	0
14	(United States) S Davis (United States) D Pate	3	6	6
15	(United States) S Denton (United States) P Fleming	2	7	6
(United States) B Levine (United States) E Van't Hof	6	6	7
(United States) M Dickson (United States) T Wilkison	4	6	6
2	(Sweden) S Edberg (Sweden) A Järryd	6	4	3

Third round
5	(Sweden) J Nyström (Sweden) M Wilander	6	7
14	(United States) S Davis (United States) D Pate	3	6
15	(United States) S Denton (United States) P Fleming	6	7	7
(United States) M Dickson (United States) T Wilkison	7	5	6

Quarterfinals
5	(Sweden) J Nyström (Sweden) M Wilander	6	6	6
15	(United States) S Denton (United States) P Fleming	3	4	4
