= 1986 US Open – Men's singles =

Men's singles
- 1986 US Open

Final
- Champion: (Czechoslovakia) Ivan Lendl
- Runner-up: (Czechoslovakia) Miloslav Mečíř
- Score: 6–4, 6–2, 6–0

Details
- Draw: 128
- Seeds: 16

Events
| Singles | men | women | | boys | girls |
| Doubles | men | women | mixed | boys | girls |
| WC Singles | men | women | quad |
| WC Doubles | men | women | quad |
| Legends | men | women | mixed |
- US Open

Defending champion Ivan Lendl defeated Miloslav Mečíř in the final, 6–4, 6–2, 6–0 to win the men's singles tennis title at the 1986 US Open. It was his second US Open title and fourth major title overall.

This was the first major main draw appearance for future world No. 1, eight-time major champion and Olympic gold medalist Andre Agassi. He would go on to play an Open Era record 21 consecutive US Open events.

This was the first US Open in history where no American man reached the semifinals.

== Seeds ==
The seeded players are listed below. Ivan Lendl is the champion; others show the round in which they were eliminated.

1. (Czechoslovakia) Ivan Lendl (champion)
2. (Sweden) Mats Wilander (fourth round)
3. (West Germany) Boris Becker (semifinalist)
4. (Sweden) Stefan Edberg (semifinalist)
5. (France) Yannick Noah (third round)
6. (United States) Jimmy Connors (third round)
7. (Sweden) Joakim Nyström (quarterfinalist)
8. (France) Henri Leconte (quarterfinalist)
9. (United States) John McEnroe (first round)
10. (Ecuador) Andrés Gómez (second round)
11. (Sweden) Mikael Pernfors (second round)
12. (France) Thierry Tulasne (first round)
13. (Sweden) Anders Järryd (third round)
14. (United States) Tim Mayotte (first round)
15. (United States) Brad Gilbert (fourth round)
16. (Czechoslovakia) Miloslav Mečíř (finalist)

== Draw ==
Key

- Q = Qualifier
- WC = Wild card
- LL = Lucky loser
- Alt = Alternate
- ITF = ITF entry
- PR = Protected ranking
- SR = Special ranking
- SE = Special exempt
- JE = Junior exempt
- JR = Junior Accelerator Programme entrant
- CO = College Accelerator Programme entrant
- NG = Next Gen Accelerator Program entrant
- w/o = Walkover
- r = Retired
- d = Defaulted

=== Finals ===
Quarterfinals
1 | (Czechoslovakia) Ivan Lendl | 7^{7} | 6 | 1 | 6
8 | (France) Henri Leconte | 6^{3} | 1 | 6 | 1
4 | (Sweden) Stefan Edberg | 6 | 6 | 6
(United States) Tim Wilkison | 3 | 3 | 3
(Czechoslovakia) Milan Šrejber | 3 | 2 | 1
3 | (West Germany) Boris Becker | 6 | 6 | 6
7 | (Sweden) Joakim Nyström | 4 | 2 | 6 | 2
16 | (Czechoslovakia) Miloslav Mečíř | 6 | 6 | 3 | 6

Semifinals
1 | (Czechoslovakia) Ivan Lendl | 7^{8} | 6 | 6
4 | (Sweden) Stefan Edberg | 6^{6} | 2 | 3
3 | (West Germany) Boris Becker | 6 | 3 | 4 | 6 | 3
16 | (Czechoslovakia) Miloslav Mečíř | 4 | 6 | 6 | 3 | 6

Final
1 | (Czechoslovakia) Ivan Lendl | 6 | 6 | 6
16 | (Czechoslovakia) Miloslav Mečíř | 4 | 2 | 0

=== Top half ===
==== Section 1 ====
First round
1 | (Czechoslovakia) I Lendl | 6 | 6 | 6
(United States) G Layendecker | 3 | 2 | 0
WC | (United States) B Pearce | 4 | 3 | 2
(United States) R Seguso | 6 | 6 | 6
(United Kingdom) J Bates | 7 | 6 | 4 | 6
WC | (United States) A Agassi | 6 | 3 | 6 | 4
WC | (United States) K Flach | 4 | 2 | 4
(Sweden) J Svensson | 6 | 6 | 6
Q | (New Zealand) K Evernden | 7 | 2 | 6 | 6
(United States) J Sadri | 5 | 6 | 7 | 7
(United States) J Kriek | 7 | 6 | 3 | 3 | 6
(Australia) M Kratzmann | 5 | 4 | 6 | 6 | 4
(Nigeria) N Odizor | 3 | 7 | 6 | 7
(Brazil) C Kirmayr | 6 | 5 | 1 | 6
Q | (United States) T Warneke | 6 | 4 | 3 | 3
15 | (United States) B Gilbert | 2 | 6 | 6 | 6

Second round
1 | (Czechoslovakia) I Lendl | 6 | 6 | 6
(United States) R Seguso | 3 | 1 | 2
(United Kingdom) J Bates | 4 | 2 | 0
(Sweden) J Svensson | 6 | 6 | 6
(United States) J Sadri | 3 | 3 | 4
(United States) J Kriek | 6 | 6 | 6
(Nigeria) N Odizor | 7 | 2 | 4 | 2
15 | (United States) B Gilbert | 5 | 6 | 6 | 6

Third round
1 | (Czechoslovakia) I Lendl | 6 | 6 | 6
(Sweden) J Svensson | 3 | 3 | 4
(United States) J Kriek | 2 | 5 | 2
15 | (United States) B Gilbert | 6 | 7 | 6

Fourth round
1 | (Czechoslovakia) I Lendl | 7 | 6 | 6
15 | (United States) B Gilbert | 5 | 1 | 2

==== Section 2 ====
First round
9 | (United States) J McEnroe | 6 | 1 | 3 | 3
(United States) P Annacone | 1 | 6 | 6 | 6
(United States) A Krickstein | 5 | 4 | 7 | 6 | 6
(Czechoslovakia) K Nováček | 7 | 6 | 6 | 1 | 3
(United States) B Green | 3 | 3 | 6 | 6 | 7
Q | (South Africa) C Campbell | 6 | 6 | 4 | 4 | 5
(United States) M Purcell | 6 | 6 | 6
(Socialist Federal Republic of Yugoslavia) S Živojinović | 4 | 2 | 1
(Czechoslovakia) T Šmid | 4 | 6 | 3
(Israel) A Mansdorf | 6 | 7 | 6
(Poland) W Fibak | 6 | 4 | 6 | 1
(Mexico) F Maciel | 3 | 6 | 7 | 6
(West Germany) H Schwaier | 6 | 7 | 3 | 3
(Argentina) H de la Peña | 7 | 6 | 6 | 6
(Argentina) M Jaite | 3 | 4 | 4
8 | (France) H Leconte | 6 | 6 | 6

Second round
(United States) P Annacone | 6 | 6 | 3 | 4 | 6
(United States) A Krickstein | 4 | 4 | 6 | 6 | 7
(United States) B Green | 3 | 4 | 2
(United States) M Purcell | 6 | 6 | 6
(Israel) A Mansdorf | 7 | 6 | 6
(Mexico) F Maciel | 5 | 0 | 0
(Argentina) H de la Peña | 1 | 2 | 0
8 | (France) H Leconte | 6 | 6 | 6

Third round
(United States) A Krickstein | 6 | 6 | 6
(United States) M Purcell | 3 | 2 | 1
(Israel) A Mansdorf | 6 | 3 | 5 | 2
8 | (France) H Leconte | 4 | 6 | 7 | 6

Fourth round
(United States) A Krickstein | 3 | 5 | 4
8 | (France) H Leconte | 6 | 7 | 6

==== Section 3 ====
First round
4 | (Sweden) Edberg | 6 | 6 | 6
(Canada) Bonneau | 0 | 3 | 0
(Austria) Muster | 0 | 7 | 3 | 5
(United States) Curren | 6 | 5 | 6 | 7
Q | (United States) Bauer | 6 | 2 | 5
(India) Krishnan | 7 | 6 | 7
(Australia) Cash | 4 | 7 | 4 | 6 | 3
(Mexico) Lavalle | 6 | 5 | 6 | 1 | 6
(United States) Brown | 3 | 6 | 6 | 4
Q | (United States) Hooper | 6 | 4 | 7 | 6
(South Africa) Moir | 6 | 6 | 6
(Sweden) Eriksson | 3 | 1 | 2
WC | (United States) Goldie | 3 | 6 | 6 | 3 | 7
(Czechoslovakia) Vajda | 6 | 4 | 3 | 6 | 5
(United States) Canter | 6 | 4 | 7 | 6 | 6
14 | (United States) Mayotte | 7 | 6 | 6 | 1 | 3

Second round
4 | (Sweden) Edberg | 7 | 3 | 4 | 6 | 6
(United States) Curren | 6 | 6 | 6 | 3 | 2
(India) Krishnan | 6 | 6 | 6
(Mexico) Lavalle | 2 | 4 | 3
Q | (United States) Hooper | 7 | 2 | 4 | 5
(South Africa) Moir | 5 | 6 | 6 | 7
WC | (United States) Goldie | 7 | 4 | 6 | 6 | 7
(United States) Canter | 6 | 6 | 3 | 7 | 6

Third round
4 | (Sweden) Edberg | 7 | 3 | 6 | 4 | 6
(India) Krishnan | 6 | 6 | 4 | 6 | 4
(South Africa) Moir | 0 | 6 | 7 | 1 | 2
WC | (United States) Goldie | 6 | 4 | 6 | 6 | 6

Fourth round
4 | (Sweden) Edberg | 6 | 6 | 6
WC | (United States) Goldie | 3 | 2 | 2

==== Section 4 ====
First round
11 | (Sweden) Pernfors | 6 | 6 | 6
(Sweden) Gunnarsson | 4 | 3 | 3
(West Germany) Osterthun | 4 | 5 | 3
(Soviet Union) Chesnokov | 6 | 7 | 6
(United States) Schultz | 4 | 6 | 1
(United States) Freeman | 6 | 7 | 6
(South Africa) Steyn | 3 | 6 | 7 | 6
(United States) Leach | 6 | 3 | 6 | 4
(Australia) McNamee | 7 | 5 | 2 | 6 | 6
(Argentina) Vilas | 5 | 7 | 6 | 1 | 3
(Austria) Skoff | 6 | 2 | 0
(United States) Wilkison | 7 | 6 | 6
(Argentina) Ingaramo | 7 | 6 | 6 | 6
(Brazil) Mattar | 6 | 3 | 7 | 3
(United States) Davis | 3 | 3 | 1
5 | (France) Noah | 6 | 6 | 6

Second round
11 | (Sweden) Pernfors | 4 | 6 | 6 | 3 | 4
(Soviet Union) Chesnokov | 6 | 4 | 4 | 6 | 6
(United States) Freeman | 7 | 6 | 6
(South Africa) Steyn | 5 | 2 | 2
(Australia) McNamee | 1 | 2 | 1
(United States) Wilkison | 6 | 6 | 6
(Argentina) Ingaramo | 4 | 1 | 2
5 | (France) Noah | 6 | 6 | 6

Third round
(Soviet Union) Chesnokov | 1 | 6 | 4 | 6 | 6
(United States) Freeman | 6 | 3 | 6 | 1 | 3
(United States) Wilkison | 7 | 3 | 4 | 6 | 6
5 | (France) Noah | 6 | 6 | 6 | 1 | 4

Fourth round
(Soviet Union) Chesnokov | 0 | 2 | 3
(United States) Wilkison | 6 | 6 | 6

=== Bottom half ===
==== Section 5 ====
First round
6 | (United States) Connors | 6 | 6 | 6
(Sweden) Sundström | 2 | 2 | 2
(Sweden) Stenlund | 1 | 4 | 4
Q | (Italy) Pistolesi | 6 | 6 | 6
(United States) Witsken | 6 | 6 | 6 | 7
(Australia) Fitzgerald | 4 | 7 | 3 | 5
Q | (Israel) Glickstein | 2 | 6 | 0 | 7 | 6
(Argentina) Bengoechea | 6 | 4 | 6 | 6 | 7
(United States) Arias | 5 | 0 | 3
(Czechoslovakia) Šrejber | 7 | 6 | 6
(Australia) Dyke | 6 | 3 | 6 | 6
(United States) Teacher | 4 | 6 | 4 | 4
(Peru) Yzaga | 7 | 6 | 7
Q | (Sweden) Bergström | 6 | 4 | 6
(United States) Pate | 3 | 6 | 6 | 5 | 6
12 | (France) Tulasne | 6 | 3 | 1 | 7 | 4

Second round
6 | (United States) Connors | 7 | 6 | 7
Q | (Italy) Pistolesi | 6 | 4 | 5
(United States) Witsken | 7 | 6 | 6
(Argentina) Bengoechea | 6 | 1 | 1
(Czechoslovakia) Šrejber | 2 | 6 | 6 | 6
(Australia) Dyke | 6 | 3 | 4 | 4
(Peru) Yzaga | 6 | 3 | 5 | 6 | 6
(United States) Pate | 4 | 6 | 7 | 2 | 3

Third round
6 | (United States) Connors | 2 | 4 | 5
(United States) Witsken | 6 | 6 | 7
(Czechoslovakia) Šrejber | 3 | 6 | 6 | 6
(Peru) Yzaga | 6 | 1 | 4 | 2

Fourth round
(United States) Witsken | 7 | 6 | 1 | 4
(Czechoslovakia) Šrejber | 6 | 7 | 6 | 6

==== Section 6 ====
First round
13 | (Sweden) Järryd | 6 | 6 | 6
WC | (United States) Parker | 4 | 2 | 2
Q | (United States) Jensen | 7 | 6 | 6
(United States) Testerman | 6 | 2 | 4
(United States) Teltscher | 6 | 6 | 6
(United States) Scanlon | 2 | 4 | 1
(Switzerland) Hlasek | 2 | 3 | 6 | 3
Q | (United States) Donnelly | 6 | 6 | 3 | 6
(United States) Wilder | 3 | 6 | 3
(South Africa) Visser | 6 | 7 | 6
(Spain) Casal | 6 | 3 | 7 | 6
(Australia) Cahill | 1 | 6 | 6 | 2
(Brazil) Motta | 2 | 7 | 5 | 7 | 6
Q | (Brazil) Acioly | 6 | 5 | 7 | 6 | 2
(Canada) Michibata | 2 | 7 | 4 | 2
3 | (West Germany) Becker | 6 | 5 | 6 | 6

Second round
13 | (Sweden) Järryd | 6 | 6 | 6
Q | (United States) Jensen | 0 | 3 | 1
(United States) Teltscher | 3 | 2 | 0
Q | (United States) Donnelly | 6 | 6 | 6
(South Africa) Visser | 2 | 1 | 3
(Spain) Casal | 6 | 6 | 6
(Brazil) Motta | 3 | 0 | 2
3 | (West Germany) Becker | 6 | 6 | 6

Third round
13 | (Sweden) Järryd | 3 | 7 | 1 | 3
Q | (United States) Donnelly | 6 | 5 | 6 | 6
(Spain) Casal | 5 | 4 | 2
3 | (West Germany) Becker | 7 | 6 | 6

Fourth round
Q | (United States) Donnelly | 4 | 3 | 7 | 4
3 | (West Germany) Becker | 6 | 6 | 6 | 6

==== Section 7 ====
First round
7 | (Sweden) Nyström | 6 | 6 | 6
(United States) Giammalva Jr. | 1 | 4 | 2
(Czechoslovakia) Složil | 7 | 6 | 6
(Sweden) Carlsson | 6 | 2 | 3
(West Germany) Jelen | 6 | 4 | 2 | 6 | 6
(Australia) Woodforde | 3 | 6 | 6 | 4 | 4
Q | (United States) Rostagno | 3 | 6 | 3
(United States) Davis | 6 | 7 | 6
Q | (Paraguay) González | 2 | 2 | 2
(Australia) Masur | 6 | 6 | 6
(Peru) Arraya | 6 | 2 | 1 | 5
(United States) Anger | 3 | 6 | 6 | 7
(United States) Holmes | 6 | 6 | 7 | 6 | 6
WC | (United States) Gullikson | 7 | 7 | 6 | 0 | 7
(Uruguay) Pérez | 3 | 6 | 1
10 | (Ecuador) Gómez | 6 | 7 | 6

Second round
7 | (Sweden) Nyström | 6 | 6 | 6
(Czechoslovakia) Složil | 2 | 1 | 0
(West Germany) Jelen | 3 | 1 | 7 | 6 | 6
(United States) Davis | 6 | 6 | 5 | 2 | 3
(Australia) Masur | 6 | 3 | 5
(United States) Anger | 7 | 6 | 7
WC | (United States) Gullikson | 3 | 6^{0} | 7^{7} | 6 | 6
10 | (Ecuador) Gómez | 6 | 7^{7} | 6^{2} | 3 | 4

Third round
7 | (Sweden) Nyström | 5 | 4 | 6 | 6 | 6
(West Germany) Jelen | 7 | 6 | 3 | 0 | 2
(United States) Anger | 3 | 6 | 4 | 6 | 6
WC | (United States) Gullikson | 6 | 4 | 6 | 4 | 4

Fourth round
7 | (Sweden) Nyström | 7 | 6 | 6
(United States) Anger | 6 | 2 | 2

==== Section 8 ====
First round
16 | (Czechoslovakia) Mečíř | 7 | 7 | 6
WC | (United States) Gullikson | 5 | 6 | 4
Q | (United States) Flur | 4 | 3 | 5
(France) Forget | 6 | 6 | 7
(South Africa) Edwards | 6 | 6 | 6
(Czechoslovakia) Pimek | 3 | 1 | 0
(Sweden) Lundgren | 2 | 6 | 3 | 6
Q | (Chile) Acuña | 6 | 2 | 6 | 7
WC | (United States) Berger | 6 | 6 | 7
(Haiti) Agénor | 4 | 3 | 5
Q | (United States) Pugh | 3 | 4 | 4
(South Africa) van Rensburg | 6 | 6 | 6
(France) Champion | 1 | 6 | 5 | 6 | 7
(Spain) Sánchez | 6 | 1 | 7 | 1 | 5
(United States) Nelson | 3 | 1 | 6 | 4
2 | (Sweden) Wilander | 6 | 6 | 4 | 6

Second round
16 | (Czechoslovakia) Mečíř | 7 | 6 | 6
(France) Forget | 5 | 4 | 1
(South Africa) Edwards | 3 | 6 | 6 | 3 | 6
Q | (Chile) Acuña | 6 | 1 | 4 | 6 | 3
WC | (United States) Berger | 2 | 1 | 0
(South Africa) van Rensburg | 6 | 6 | 6
(France) Champion | 1 | 5 | 4
2 | (Sweden) Wilander | 6 | 7 | 6

Third round
16 | (Czechoslovakia) Mečíř | 6 | 6 | 6
(South Africa) Edwards | 0 | 3 | 3
(South Africa) van Rensburg | 7 | 3 | 4 | 4
2 | (Sweden) Wilander | 5 | 6 | 6 | 6

Fourth round
16 | (Czechoslovakia) Mečíř | 6 | 6 | 6 | 6
2 | (Sweden) Wilander | 7 | 3 | 3 | 4

| Preceded by 1986 Wimbledon Championships – Men's singles | Grand Slam men's singles | Succeeded by 1987 Australian Open – Men's singles |
