= 1986 US Open – Mixed doubles =

Mixed doubles
- 1986 US Open

Final
- Champions: (Italy) Raffaella Reggi (Spain) Sergio Casal
- Runners-up: (United States) Martina Navratilova (United States) Peter Fleming
- Score: 6–4, 6–4

Details
- Draw: 32
- Seeds: 8

Events
Singles	men	women		boys	girls
Doubles	men	women	mixed	boys	girls
WC Singles	men	women	quad
WC Doubles	men	women	quad
Legends	men	women	mixed
- US Open

Martina Navratilova and Heinz Günthardt were the defending champions but only Navratilova competed that year with Peter Fleming.

Navratilova and Fleming lost in the final 6–4, 6–4 against Raffaella Reggi and Sergio Casal.

== Seeds ==
Champion seeds are indicated in bold text while text in italics indicates the round in which those seeds were eliminated.

1. (United States) Martina Navratilova / (United States) Peter Fleming (final)
2. (United States) Kathy Jordan / (United States) Ken Flach (quarterfinals)
3. (Australia) Elizabeth Smylie / (Australia) John Fitzgerald (semifinals)
4. (United States) Betsy Nagelsen / (United States) Scott Davis (second round)
5. (West Germany) Bettina Bunge / (Spain) Emilio Sánchez (semifinals)
6. (Canada) Carling Bassett / (United States) Gary Donnelly (second round)
7. (United States) Mary Lou Piatek / (United States) Robert Van't Hof (first round)
8. (Australia) Wendy Turnbull / (United Kingdom) John Lloyd (first round)

== Draw ==
Key

- Q = Qualifier
- WC = Wild card
- LL = Lucky loser
- Alt = Alternate
- ITF = ITF entry
- PR = Protected ranking
- SR = Special ranking
- SE = Special exempt
- JE = Junior exempt
- JR = Junior Accelerator Programme entrant
- CO = College Accelerator Programme entrant
- NG = Next Gen Accelerator Program entrant
- w/o = Walkover
- r = Retired
- d = Defaulted

=== Final ===
Final
1	(United States) Martina Navratilova (United States) Peter Fleming	4	4
	(Italy) **Raffaella Reggi** (Spain) **Sergio Casal**	**6**	**6**

=== Top half ===
First round
1	(United States) **M Navratilova** (United States) **P Fleming**	**6**	**6**
(United States) L McNeil (United States) B Cox	2	1
(United States) P Louie-Harper (United States) M Mitchell	**6**	6	5
WC	(United States) **M J Fernández** (Australia) **F Stolle**	4	**7**	**7**
(United States) **Z Garrison** (United States) **M Freeman**	**7**	4	**6**
(France) C Tanvier (Australia) M Kratzmann	6	**6**	3
(Denmark) **T Scheuer-Larsen** (Denmark) **M Mortensen**	**6**	**6**
7	(United States) M L Piatek (United States) R Van't Hof	3	2
3	(Australia) **E Smylie** (Australia) **J Fitzgerald**	6	**6**	**6**
(Czechoslovakia) H Mandlíková (Australia) M Fancutt	**7**	4	4
(United States) A White (United States) L Stefanki	0	6
(South Africa) **E Reinach** (South Africa) **M Robertson**	**6**	**7**
(United States) **E Burgin** (United States) **B Testerman**	**7**	5	**6**
(United States) J Russell (United States) D Gitlin	5	**7**	4
(United States) A Smith (Australia) K Warwick	**7**	1	3
6	(Canada) **C Bassett** (United States) **G Donnelly**	5	**6**	**6**

Second round
1	(United States) **M Navratilova** (United States) **P Fleming**	**7**	**6**
WC	(United States) M J Fernández (Australia) F Stolle	5	2
(United States) Z Garrison (United States) M Freeman	3	5
(Denmark) **T Scheuer-Larsen** (Denmark) **M Mortensen**	**6**	**7**
3	(Australia) **E Smylie** (Australia) **J Fitzgerald**	3	**7**	**6**
(South Africa) E Reinach (South Africa) M Robertson	**6**	6	3
(United States) **E Burgin** (United States) **B Testerman**	**6**	**7**
6	(Canada) C Bassett (United States) G Donnelly	3	5

Quarterfinals
1	(United States) **M Navratilova** (United States) **P Fleming**	**6**	**6**
(Denmark) T Scheuer-Larsen (Denmark) M Mortensen	4	1
3	(Australia) **E Smylie** (Australia) **J Fitzgerald**	**7**	**6**
(United States) E Burgin (United States) B Testerman	5	3

Semifinals
1	(United States) **M Navratilova** (United States) **P Fleming**	**7**	**7**
3	(Australia) E Smylie (Australia) J Fitzgerald	5	5

=== Bottom half ===
First round
5	(West Germany) **B Bunge** (Spain) **E Sánchez**	**6**	**6**
WC	(United Kingdom) A Hobbs (Australia) O Davidson	3	3
(United States) K Sands (United States) M Leach	3	**6**	3
(France) **C Suire** (United States) **C Hooper**	**6**	3	**6**
(Australia) **J Byrne** (Australia) **D Cahill**	**6**	**6**
(United States) G Rush (United States) D Stockton	3	4
(West Germany) E Pfaff (United States) S Denton	6	4
4	(United States) **B Nagelsen** (United States) **S Davis**	**7**	**6**
8	(Australia) W Turnbull (United Kingdom) J Lloyd	4	4
(United Kingdom) **V Wade** (United Kingdom) **C Dowdeswell**	**6**	**6**
(United States) P Fendick (United States) A Kohlberg	**6**	6	1
(Italy) **R Reggi** (Spain) **S Casal**	3	**7**	**6**
(United States) **R Casals** (United States) **Tim Gullikson**	4	**6**	**6**
(South Africa) R Fairbank (United States) S Stewart	**6**	2	3
(United States) S Collins (United States) Tom Gullikson	1	1
2	(United States) **K Jordan** (United States) **K Flach**	**6**	**6**

Second round
5	(West Germany) **B Bunge** (Spain) **E Sánchez**	**7**	**6**
(France) C Suire (United States) C Hooper	6	1
(Australia) **J Byrne** (Australia) **D Cahill**	4	**7**	**6**
4	(United States) B Nagelsen (United States) S Davis	**6**	6	4
(United Kingdom) V Wade (United Kingdom) C Dowdeswell	6	**7**	6
(Italy) **R Reggi** (Spain) **S Casal**	**7**	6	**7**
(United States) R Casals (United States) Tim Gullikson	3	2
2	(United States) **K Jordan** (United States) **K Flach**	**6**	**6**

Quarterfinals
5	(West Germany) **B Bunge** (Spain) **E Sánchez**	**6**	4	**6**
(Australia) J Byrne (Australia) D Cahill	4	**6**	3
(Italy) **R Reggi** (Spain) **S Casal**	**7**	**6**
2	(United States) K Jordan (United States) K Flach	5	3

Semifinals
5	(West Germany) B Bunge (Spain) E Sánchez	4	3
(Italy) **R Reggi** (Spain) **S Casal**	**6**	**6**
