= 1986 US Open (tennis) =

- Date: August 26 – September 7
- Edition: 106th
- Category: Grand Slam (ITF)
- Surface: Hardcourt
- Location: New York City, New York, United States

Champions

Men's singles
- (Czechoslovakia) Ivan Lendl

Women's singles
- (United States) Martina Navratilova

Men's doubles
- (Ecuador) Andrés Gómez / (Socialist Federal Republic of Yugoslavia) Slobodan Živojinović

Women's doubles
- (United States) Martina Navratilova / (United States) Pam Shriver

Mixed doubles
- (Italy) Raffaella Reggi / (Spain) Sergio Casal

Boys' singles
- (Spain) Javier Sánchez

Girls' singles
- (United States) Elly Hakami

Boys' doubles
- (Spain) Tomás Carbonell / (Spain) Javier Sánchez

Girls' doubles
- (Czechoslovakia) Jana Novotná / (Czechoslovakia) Radka Zrubáková
- US Open

The 1986 US Open was a tennis tournament played on outdoor hard courts at the USTA National Tennis Center in New York City in New York in the United States. It was the 106th edition of the US Open and was held from August 26 to September 7, 1986.

== Seniors ==
=== Men's singles ===
(Czechoslovakia) Ivan Lendl defeated (Czechoslovakia) Miloslav Mečíř 6–4, 6–2, 6–0

- It was Lendl's 4th career Grand Slam title and his 2nd US Open title.

=== Women's singles ===
(United States) Martina Navratilova defeated (Czechoslovakia) Helena Suková 6–3, 6–2

- It was Navratilova's 41st career Grand Slam title and her 3rd US Open singles title.

=== Men's doubles ===
(Ecuador) Andrés Gómez / (Socialist Federal Republic of Yugoslavia) Slobodan Živojinović defeated (Sweden) Joakim Nyström / (Sweden) Mats Wilander 4–6, 6–3, 6–3, 4–6, 6–3

- It was Gómez's 1st career Grand Slam title and his only US Open title. It was Živojinović's only career Grand Slam title.

=== Women's doubles ===
(United States) Martina Navratilova / (United States) Pam Shriver defeated (Czechoslovakia) Hana Mandlíková / (Australia) Wendy Turnbull 6–4, 3–6, 6–3

- It was Navratilova's 42nd career Grand Slam title and her 10th US Open title. It was Shriver's 14th career Grand Slam title and her 3rd US Open title.

=== Mixed doubles ===
(Italy) Raffaella Reggi / (Spain) Sergio Casal defeated (United States) Martina Navratilova / (United States) Peter Fleming 6–4, 6–4

- It was Reggi's only career Grand Slam title. It was Casal's 1st career Grand Slam title and his 1st US Open title.

== Juniors ==
=== Boys' singles ===
(Spain) Javier Sánchez defeated (Argentina) Franco Davín 6–2, 6–2

=== Girls' singles ===
(United States) Elly Hakami defeated (United States) Shaun Stafford 6–2, 6–1

=== Boys' doubles ===
(Spain) Tomás Carbonell / (Spain) Javier Sánchez defeated (United States) Jeff Tarango / (United States) David Wheaton 6–4, 1–6, 6–1

=== Girls' doubles ===
(Czechoslovakia) Jana Novotná / (Czechoslovakia) Radka Zrubáková defeated (Soviet Union) Elena Brioukhovets / (Soviet Union) Leila Meskhi 6–4, 6–2

Preceded by 1986 Wimbledon Championships	Grand Slams	Succeeded by 1987 Australian Open
