= 1985 US Open – Women's doubles =

Women's doubles
- 1985 US Open

Final
- Champions: (West Germany) Claudia Kohde-Kilsch (Czechoslovakia) Helena Suková
- Runners-up: (United States) Martina Navratilova (United States) Pam Shriver
- Score: 6–7^{(5–7)}, 6–2, 6–3

Details
- Draw: 64
- Seeds: 16

Events
Singles	men	women		boys	girls
Doubles	men	women	mixed	boys	girls
WC Singles	men	women	quad
WC Doubles	men	women	quad
Legends	men	women	mixed
← 1984 ·	US Open	· 1986 →

Claudia Kohde-Kilsch and Helena Suková defeated 2-time defending champions Martina Navratilova and Pam Shriver in the final 6–7^{(5–7)}, 6–2, 6–3. After winning 8 consecutive women’s doubles grand slams, this is the 2nd consecutive runner-up finish for Navratilova and Shriver.

== Seeds ==
Champion seeds are indicated in bold text while text in italics indicates the round in which those seeds were eliminated.

1. (United States) Martina Navratilova / (United States) Pam Shriver (final)
2. (West Germany) **Claudia Kohde-Kilsch** / (Czechoslovakia) **Helena Suková (champions)**
3. (United States) Kathy Jordan / (Australia) Elizabeth Smylie (second round)
4. (Czechoslovakia) Hana Mandlíková / (Australia) Wendy Turnbull (semifinals)
5. (United States) Barbara Potter / (United States) Sharon Walsh-Pete (quarterfinals)
6. (West Germany) Bettina Bunge / (West Germany) Eva Pfaff (third round)
7. (United States) Elise Burgin / (United States) Alycia Moulton (second round)
8. (Canada) Carling Bassett / (United States) Chris Evert-Lloyd (quarterfinals)
9. (United States) Gigi Fernández / (United States) Robin White (quarterfinals)
10. (South Africa) Rosalyn Fairbank / (United States) Bonnie Gadusek (first round)
11. (United States) Candy Reynolds / (United States) Paula Smith (third round)
12. (Netherlands) Marcella Mesker / (France) Pascale Paradis (third round)
13. (United States) Kathleen Horvath / (Romania) Virginia Ruzici (third round)
14. (Bulgaria) Katerina Maleeva / (Bulgaria) Manuela Maleeva (second round)
15. (Hungary) Andrea Temesvári / (Argentina) Adriana Villagrán (first round)
16. (United Kingdom) Anne Hobbs / (Switzerland) Christiane Jolissaint (third round)

== Draw ==
=== Key ===
- Q = Qualifier
- WC = Wild card
- LL = Lucky loser
- Alt = Alternate
- ITF = ITF entry
- PR = Protected ranking
- SR = Special ranking
- SE = Special exempt
- JE = Junior exempt
- JR = Junior Accelerator Programme entrant
- CO = College Accelerator Programme entrant
- NG = Next Gen Accelerator Program entrant
- w/o = Walkover
- r = Retired
- d = Defaulted

=== Finals ===
Semifinals
1	(United States) Martina Navratilova (United States) Pam Shriver	6	6
4	(Czechoslovakia) Hana Mandlíková (Australia) Wendy Turnbull	3	4
(United States) Zina Garrison (United States) Kathy Rinaldi	7	4	3
2	(West Germany) Claudia Kohde-Kilsch (Czechoslovakia) Helena Suková	5	6	6

Final
1	(United States) Martina Navratilova (United States) Pam Shriver	7^{7}	2	3
2	(West Germany) Claudia Kohde-Kilsch (Czechoslovakia) Helena Suková	6^{5}	6	6

=== Top half ===
==== Section 1 ====
First round
1	(United States) M Navratilova (United States) P Shriver	6	6
(United States) C MacGregor (New Zealand) J Richardson	0	2
(United States) C Benjamin (United States) R Blount	6	6
(United States) J Kaplan (Poland) I Kuczyńska	3	3
(Socialist Federal Republic of Yugoslavia) S Goleš (United States) E Raponi-Longo	4	4
(Socialist Federal Republic of Yugoslavia) M Jaušovec (West Germany) M Schropp	6	6
(United States) B Jordan (Netherlands) B Stöve	6	1	2
11	(United States) C Reynolds (United States) P Smith	3	6	6
9	(United States) G Fernández (United States) R White	6	6
(United States) S Foltz (United States) M Quinlan	2	1
(South Africa) I Kloss (South Africa) Y Vermaak	7	3	1
(United Kingdom) J Durie (West Germany) S Graf	5	6	6
(United States) P Fendick (Canada) J Hetherington	7	6
(Czechoslovakia) A Holíková (Czechoslovakia) K Skronská	5	3
(United States) L Bonder (United States) S Mascarin	4	4
7	(United States) E Burgin (United States) A Moulton	6	6

Second round
1	(United States) M Navratilova (United States) P Shriver	6	6
(United States) C Benjamin (United States) R Blount	4	2
(Socialist Federal Republic of Yugoslavia) M Jaušovec (West Germany) M Schropp	2	0
11	(United States) C Reynolds (United States) P Smith	6	6
9	(United States) G Fernández (United States) R White	6	7^{7}
(United Kingdom) J Durie (West Germany) S Graf	4	6^{4}
(United States) P Fendick (Canada) J Hetherington	6	3	7^{7}
7	(United States) E Burgin (United States) A Moulton	4	6	6^{1}

Third round
1	(United States) M Navratilova (United States) P Shriver	6	6
11	(United States) C Reynolds (United States) P Smith	2	2
9	(United States) G Fernández (United States) R White	6	6
(United States) P Fendick (Canada) J Hetherington	2	2

Quarterfinals
1	(United States) M Navratilova (United States) P Shriver	6	6
9	(United States) G Fernández (United States) R White	3	0

==== Section 2 ====
First round
4	(Czechoslovakia) H Mandlíková (Australia) W Turnbull	6	6
(United Kingdom) A Brown (United Kingdom) S Gomer	1	3
(United States) S Collins (United States) M-L Piatek	6	6
(United States) S London (United States) N Sodupe	2	4
(United States) B Herr (United States) T Phelps	6	2	6
(Argentina) M Paz (Argentina) G Sabatini	3	6	3
(United States) P Barg (United States) R Reis	4	5
16	(United Kingdom) A Hobbs (Switzerland) C Jolissaint	6	7
14	(Bulgaria) K Maleeva (Bulgaria) M Maleeva	6	6
(Brazil) P Medrado (Brazil) C Monteiro	2	3
(Sweden) C Lindqvist (United States) J Russell	7^{7}	6
(Italy) S Cecchini (Brazil) N Dias	6^{5}	1
(United States) K McDaniel (United States) W White	4	2
(Sweden) C Karlsson (Denmark) T Scheuer-Larsen	6	6
(United States) P Louie (United States) K Shaefer	6^{6}	2
6	(West Germany) B Bunge (West Germany) E Pfaff	7^{8}	6

Second round
4	(Czechoslovakia) H Mandlíková (Australia) W Turnbull	6	6
(United States) S Collins (United States) M-L Piatek	2	2
(United States) B Herr (United States) T Phelps	6	4	3
16	(United Kingdom) A Hobbs (Switzerland) C Jolissaint	3	6	6
14	(Bulgaria) K Maleeva (Bulgaria) M Maleeva	0	4
(Sweden) C Lindqvist (United States) J Russell	6	6
(Sweden) C Karlsson (Denmark) T Scheuer-Larsen	2	4
6	(West Germany) B Bunge (West Germany) E Pfaff	6	6

Third round
4	(Czechoslovakia) H Mandlíková (Australia) W Turnbull	6	6
16	(United Kingdom) A Hobbs (Switzerland) C Jolissaint	3	4
(Sweden) C Lindqvist (United States) J Russell	6^{0}	6	6
6	(West Germany) B Bunge (West Germany) E Pfaff	7^{7}	4	0

Quarterfinals
4	(Czechoslovakia) H Mandlíková (Australia) W Turnbull	6	3	6
(Sweden) C Lindqvist (United States) J Russell	1	6	0

=== Bottom half ===
==== Section 3 ====
First round
8	(Canada) C Bassett (United States) C Evert-Lloyd	6	6
(Switzerland) L Drescher (Japan) E Inoue	2	4
(Czechoslovakia) I Budařová (Czechoslovakia) M Skuherská	6	6
(United States) J Golder (United States) V Nelson	2	3
(United States) P Casale (Italy) R Reggi	1	1
(United States) L Antonoplis (United States) A Henricksson	6	6
(United States) L Allen (United States) K Copeland	1	3
13	(United States) K Horvath (Romania) V Ruzici	6	6
10	(South Africa) R Fairbank (United States) B Gadusek	4	3
(South Africa) B Mould (Australia) P Whytcross	6	6
(United States) Z Garrison (United States) K Rinaldi	5	7^{7}	7^{7}
(United States) A Jaeger (United States) A White	7	6^{1}	6^{5}
(Peru) L Gildemeister (United States) A Holton	7^{7}	6
(France) S Amiach (United States) B Gerken	6^{5}	3
(South Africa) J Mundel (United States) M Van Nostrand	2	2
3	(United States) K Jordan (Australia) E Smylie	6	6

Second round
8	(Canada) C Bassett (United States) C Evert-Lloyd	6	6
(Czechoslovakia) I Budařová (Czechoslovakia) M Skuherská	3	4
(United States) L Antonoplis (United States) A Henricksson	6	6^{3}	3
13	(United States) K Horvath (Romania) V Ruzici	0	7^{7}	6
(South Africa) B Mould (Australia) P Whytcross	3	2
(United States) Z Garrison (United States) K Rinaldi	6	6
(Peru) L Gildemeister (United States) A Holton	6	6
3	(United States) K Jordan (Australia) E Smylie	3	3

Third round
8	(Canada) C Bassett (United States) C Evert-Lloyd	6	6
13	(United States) K Horvath (Romania) V Ruzici	4	2
(United States) Z Garrison (United States) K Rinaldi	6	6
(Peru) L Gildemeister (United States) A Holton	1	2

Quarterfinals
8	(Canada) C Bassett (United States) C Evert-Lloyd	2	3
(United States) Z Garrison (United States) K Rinaldi	6	6

==== Section 4 ====
First round
5	(United States) B Potter (United States) S Walsh-Pete	6	7^{7}
(Japan) N Sato (United States) K Steinmetz	2	6^{3}
(United States) T Mochizuki (Japan) E Okagawa	6	2	4
(United States) H Crowe (United States) A M Fernandez	3	6	6
(Australia) A Minter (Australia) E Minter	7^{7}	3	6
(United States) T Holladay (United States) L Howell	6^{5}	6	1
(United Kingdom) A Croft (South Africa) R Uys	6	2	3
12	(Netherlands) M Mesker (France) P Paradis	2	6	6
15	(Hungary) A Temesvári (Argentina) A Villagrán	6^{1}	3
(United States) L McNeil (United States) K Sands	7^{7}	6
(France) I Demongeot (France) N Tauziat	6	6
(Austria) P Huber (Greece) A Kanellopoulou	3	2
(United States) J Goodling (Canada) H Pelletier	2	2
(United States) R Casals (United States) A Smith	6	6
(France) C Suire (United Kingdom) V Wade	4	4
2	(West Germany) C Kohde-Kilsch (Czechoslovakia) H Suková	6	6

Second round
5	(United States) B Potter (United States) S Walsh-Pete	6	6
(United States) H Crowe (United States) A M Fernandez	3	3
(Australia) A Minter (Australia) E Minter	4	6	5
12	(Netherlands) M Mesker (France) P Paradis	6	3	7
(United States) L McNeil (United States) K Sands	7^{7}	6
(France) I Demongeot (France) N Tauziat	6^{1}	1
(United States) R Casals (United States) A Smith	2	5
2	(West Germany) C Kohde-Kilsch (Czechoslovakia) H Suková	6	7

Third round
5	(United States) B Potter (United States) S Walsh-Pete	3	6	7^{7}
12	(Netherlands) M Mesker (France) P Paradis	6	1	6^{4}
(United States) L McNeil (United States) K Sands	7^{8}	2	4
2	(West Germany) C Kohde-Kilsch (Czechoslovakia) H Suková	6^{6}	6	6

Quarterfinals
5	(United States) B Potter (United States) S Walsh-Pete	7^{7}	4	2
2	(West Germany) C Kohde-Kilsch (Czechoslovakia) H Suková	6^{4}	6	6
