= Deeann Hansel =

American tennis player

- Country (sports): United States
- Born: June 11, 1962 (age 62)
- Prize money: $44,577

Singles
- Career record: 48–59
- Highest ranking: No. 152 (August 3, 1987)

Grand Slam singles results
- Australian Open: 1R (1985, 1988)
- Wimbledon: Q2 (1987)
- US Open: 1R (1986)

Doubles
- Career record: 17–31
- Highest ranking: No. 122 (July 20, 1987)

Grand Slam doubles results
- Australian Open: 2R (1988)
- French Open: 1R (1987)
- Wimbledon: 1R (1987)
- US Open: 1R (1987)

Deeann Hansel (born June 11, 1962) is an American former professional tennis player.

A native of Atlanta, Georgia, Hansel competed on the professional tour during the 1980s, reaching a career high singles ranking of 152 in the world.

Hansel qualified for her first grand slam main draw at the 1985 Australian Open and faced second seed Martina Navratilova in the first round, who won in straight sets and went on to win the title. She also qualified for the US Open in 1986 and as a doubles player featured in all four grand slam events.

Her best performances on the WTA Tour came at the Newport tournament, where she had an upset win over world number 21 Melissa Gurney in 1987, then in 1988 defeated Pam Casale in the first round.

== ITF finals ==
Legend
$25,000 tournaments
$10,000 tournaments

=== Singles: 3 (0–3) ===
Result	No.	Date	Tournament	Surface	Opponent	Score
Loss	1.	October 17, 1983	Newcastle, Australia	Grass	(New Zealand) Belinda Cordwell	1–6, 2–6
Loss	2.	October 31, 1983	Tanglewood, Australia	Hard	(Australia) Karen Smith	3–6, 3–6
Loss	3.	August 11, 1985	Freehold, United States	Hard	(United States) Caroline Kuhlman	6–3, 2–6, 0–6

=== Doubles: 4 (1–3) ===
Result	No.	Date	Tournament	Surface	Partner	Opponents	Score
Loss	1.	October 9, 1983	Bendigo, Australia	Grass	(United States) Jaime Kaplan	(United States) Lisa Dodson (United States) Lani Wilcox	7–6, 3–6, 4–6
Loss	2.	September 29, 1985	Baltimore, United States	Hard	(United States) Carol Watson	(United States) Mary Dailey (South Africa) Monica Reinach	5–7, 4–6
Win	1.	July 27, 1986	Pittsburgh, United States	Hard	(United States) Gretchen Magers	(United States) Stephanie London (United States) Ronni Reis	6–1, 6–0
Loss	3.	January 18, 1987	Miami, United States	Hard	(Poland) Renata Baranski	(United States) Cheryl Jones (United States) Rochelle Morrisson	5–7, 6–7
