= 1986 US Open – Women's singles =

Women's singles
- 1986 US Open

Final
- Champion: (United States) Martina Navratilova
- Runner-up: (Czechoslovakia) Helena Suková
- Score: 6–3, 6–2

Details
- Draw: 128
- Seeds: 16

Events
Singles	men	women		boys	girls
Doubles	men	women	mixed	boys	girls
WC Singles	men	women	quad
WC Doubles	men	women	quad
Legends	men	women	mixed
← 1985 ·	US Open	· 1987 →

Martina Navratilova defeated Helena Suková in the final, 6–3, 6–2 to win the women's singles tennis title at the 1986 US Open. It was her third US Open singles title and 15th major singles title overall. Navratilova became the first woman in the Open Era to win a major after saving match points en route, saving three against Steffi Graf in the semifinals.

Hana Mandlíková was the defending champion, but lost in the fourth round to Wendy Turnbull.

== Seeds ==
The seeded players are listed below. Martina Navratilova is the champion; others show the round in which they were eliminated.

1. (United States) Martina Navratilova (champion)
2. (United States) Chris Evert (semifinalist)
3. (West Germany) Steffi Graf (semifinalist)
4. (Czechoslovakia) Hana Mandlíková (fourth round)
5. (United States) Pam Shriver (quarterfinalist)
6. (West Germany) Claudia Kohde-Kilsch (fourth round)
7. (Czechoslovakia) Helena Suková (finalist)
8. (United States) Bonnie Gadusek (quarterfinalist)
9. (Bulgaria) Manuela Maleeva (quarterfinalist)
10. (United States) Kathy Rinaldi (first round)
11. (Argentina) Gabriela Sabatini (fourth round)
12. (United States) Zina Garrison (fourth round)
13. (United States) Stephanie Rehe (fourth round)
14. (Sweden) Catarina Lindqvist (fourth round)
15. (United States) Kathy Jordan (fourth round)
16. (Canada) Carling Bassett (first round)

== Draw ==
=== Key ===
- Q = Qualifier
- WC = Wild card
- LL = Lucky loser
- r = Retired

=== Final eight ===
Quarterfinals
1	(United States) Martina Navratilova	6	6
5	(United States) Pam Shriver	2	4
3	(West Germany) Steffi Graf	6	6
8	(United States) Bonnie Gadusek	3	1
7	(Czechoslovakia) Helena Suková	6	6
(Australia) Wendy Turnbull	4	0
9	(Bulgaria) Manuela Maleeva	2	2
2	(United States) Chris Evert	6	6

Semifinals
1	(United States) Martina Navratilova	6	6^{3}	7^{10}
3	(West Germany) Steffi Graf	1	7^{7}	6^{8}
7	(Czechoslovakia) Helena Suková	6	6
2	(United States) Chris Evert	2	4

Finals
1	(United States) Martina Navratilova	6	6
7	(Czechoslovakia) Helena Suková	3	2

=== Earlier rounds ===
==== Section 1 ====
First round
1	(United States) Navratilova	6	6
(Czechoslovakia) Holíková	4	2
(United States) Nagelsen	6	7^{7}
(Austria) Huber	4	6^{3}
(United States) Horvath	6	6
(United States) Sloane	3	2
(United States) Fendick	6	7^{8}
(United States) Thompson	3	6^{6}
(Bulgaria) K Maleeva	6	7
Q	(Australia) Leo	3	5
(Australia) Byrne	6	6
WC	(United States) Kinney	3	1
(United States) Casale	6	3	7^{7}
(United Kingdom) Hobbs	3	6	6^{4}
11	(Argentina) Sabatini	6	6
(France) Tauziat	3	2

Second round
1	(United States) Navratilova	6	7
(United States) Nagelsen	2	5
(United States) Horvath	7	6
(United States) Fendick	5	4
(Bulgaria) K Maleeva	6	6
(Australia) Byrne	1	2
(United States) Casale	0	3
11	(Argentina) Sabatini	6	6

Third round
1	(United States) Navratilova	6	6
(United States) Horvath	4	2
(Bulgaria) K Maleeva	5	2
11	(Argentina) Sabatini	7	6

Fourth round
1	(United States) Navratilova	6	6
11	(Argentina) Sabatini	4	2

==== Section 2 ====
First round
15	(United States) Jordan	6	3	6
Q	(United States) Sands	3	6	3
(United States) Werdel	6	6
(Italy) Cecchini	4	3
(United States) Rush	6
(United States) Henricksson	1
(Australia) Minter	6	7^{7}
Q	(United States) Eldredge	3	6^{3}
(United States) Van Nostrand	4	7^{7}	6
(United States) Kim	6	6^{5}	4
(United States) Burgin	4	6	6
Q	(United States) Hansel	6	3	4
(Switzerland) Bartos-Cserepy	6	7^{7}
(West Germany) Betzner	1	6^{5}
5	(United States) Shriver	6	6
(United States) Holladay	1	0

Second round
15	(United States) Jordan	6	6
(United States) Werdel	0	3
(United States) Rush	4	4
(Australia) Minter	6	6
(United States) Van Nostrand	2	6	6^{7}
(United States) Burgin	6	2	7^{9}
(Switzerland) Bartos-Cserepy	6^{0}	0
5	(United States) Shriver	7^{7}	6

Third round
15	(United States) Jordan	6	6
(Australia) Minter	1	3
(United States) Burgin	4	7	2
5	(United States) Shriver	6	5	6

Fourth round
15	(United States) Jordan	4	4
5	(United States) Shriver	6	6

==== Section 3 ====
First round
3	(West Germany) Graf	6	6
(United States) Mascarin	0	1
(Hungary) Temesvári	6	6
(United States) White	3	2
(United States) Bowes	6	7^{7}
(United States) Smith	2	6^{4}
(France) Paradis	6^{5}	6	6
(Argentina) Villagrán	7^{7}	3	1
(United States) Phelps	6	6
WC	(United States) Sodupe	4	4
(Italy) Reggi	6	6
(South Africa) Vermaak	1	1
(United States) Kuhlman	6	7^{7}
Q	(United States) Barg	3	6^{3}
(United States) Torres	6	6
10	(United States) Rinaldi	1	4

Second round
3	(West Germany) Graf	6	6
(Hungary) Temesvári	1	0
(United States) Bowes	6	0	6
(France) Paradis	4	6	4
(United States) Phelps	4	1
(Italy) Reggi	6	6
(United States) Kuhlman	2	6^{5}
(United States) Torres	6	7^{7}

Third round
3	(West Germany) Graf	6	1
(United States) Bowes	1	0	r
(Italy) Reggi	6	6
(United States) Torres	3	2

Fourth round
3	(West Germany) Graf	6	3	6
(Italy) Reggi	1	6	0

==== Section 4 ====
First round
13	(United States) Rehe	6	6
WC	(United States) Walsh-Pete	0	3
(United States) Macgregor	7^{7}	6
(West Germany) Cueto	6^{5}	2
(United States) Louie-Harper	7	2	7
(Brazil) Dias	5	6	5
(United Kingdom) Croft	4	6	7
(France) Demongeot	6	0	5
(Canada) Kelesi	7^{7}	6
WC	(United States) Whitlinger	6^{5}	4
(West Germany) Bunge	7	6
(United States) Gompert	5	4
(Australia) Smylie	6^{4}	7	7^{7}
(United States) McNeil	7^{7}	5	6^{4}
8	(United States) Gadusek	7	6
Q	(New Zealand) Richardson	5	2

Second round
13	(United States) Rehe	6	4	7^{7}
(United States) Macgregor	3	6	6^{4}
(United States) Louie-Harper	0	6^{4}
(United Kingdom) Croft	6	7^{7}
(Canada) Kelesi	6	7
(West Germany) Bunge	1	5
(Australia) Smylie	3	4
8	(United States) Gadusek	6	6

Third round
13	(United States) Rehe	6	6
(United Kingdom) Croft	2	3
(Canada) Kelesi	7^{7}	2	2
8	(United States) Gadusek	6^{4}	6	6

Fourth round
13	(United States) Rehe	6^{6}	6	2
8	(United States) Gadusek	7^{8}	4	6

==== Section 5 ====
First round
7	(Czechoslovakia) Suková	6	6
(Switzerland) Drescher	3	2
(United Kingdom) Gomer	6	6
(Greece) Kanellopoulou	3	4
(United States) Herr	6	6
WC	(United States) Smith	0	1
(United States) Bonder	6	6
(Japan) Inoue	2	4
(United States) Gurney	6	6
LL	(United States) Antonoplis	3	0
(South Africa) Fairbank	6	2	6
(United States) Nelson-Dunbar	4	6	2
(West Germany) Pfaff	6	6
LL	(Argentina) Pérez Roldán	1	1
12	(United States) Garrison	6	6
WC	(United States) Russell	3	3

Second round
7	(Czechoslovakia) Suková	7	7
(United Kingdom) Gomer	5	5
(United States) Herr	3	3
(United States) Bonder	6	6
(United States) Gurney	3	6	7^{7}
(South Africa) Fairbank	6	3	6^{3}
(West Germany) Pfaff	7^{7}	1	4
12	(United States) Garrison	6^{5}	6	6

Third round
7	(Czechoslovakia) Suková	6	6
(United States) Bonder	2	0
(United States) Gurney	3	2
12	(United States) Garrison	6	6

Fourth round
7	(Czechoslovakia) Suková	6	2	6
12	(United States) Garrison	4	6	4

==== Section 6 ====
First round
(United States) Moulton	6	4	6
16	(Canada) Bassett	4	6	0
(Australia) Turnbull	4	6	6
(South Africa) Van Rensburg	6	4	1
(United States) White	2	6	6
(Socialist Federal Republic of Yugoslavia) Goleš	6	4	4
Q	(United States) Arendt	7	2	6
(Australia) Minter	5	6	2
(South Africa) Reinach	6	6
(United States) Shaefer	3	4
(Sweden) Karlsson	7^{7}	6
(Japan) Yanagi	6^{4}	2
(Czechoslovakia) Budařová	6	6
WC	(United States) A-M Fernandez	2	3
4	(Czechoslovakia) Mandlíková	6	6
(France) Calleja	2	2

Second round
(United States) Moulton	2	0
(Australia) Turnbull	6	6
(United States) White	5	6	1
Q	(United States) Arendt	7	4	6
(South Africa) Reinach	6	6
(Sweden) Karlsson	3	1
(Czechoslovakia) Budařová	2	3
4	(Czechoslovakia) Mandlíková	6	6

Third round
(Australia) Turnbull	3	7^{7}	6
Q	(United States) Arendt	6	6^{1}	1
(South Africa) Reinach	4	2
4	(Czechoslovakia) Mandlíková	6	6

Fourth round
(Australia) Turnbull	6	1	6
4	(Czechoslovakia) Mandlíková	4	6	3

==== Section 7 ====
First round
6	(West Germany) Kohde-Kilsch	7^{7}	6
(Switzerland) Jolissaint	6^{1}	2
(France) Tanvier	6	6
(West Germany) Porwik	0	3
(United States) Na	6	6
(France) Herreman	4	2
(United Kingdom) Durie	6	4	7
(Argentina) Paz	4	6	5
Q	(United States) Hakami	6	4	6
(Brazil) Medrado	4	6	2
(United States) Benjamin	6	3	6
(United States) Piatek	4	6	3
(Peru) Gildemeister	2	6	6
(France) Suire	6	4	2
9	(Bulgaria) M Maleeva	6	6
WC	(United States) Reynolds	2	4

Second round
6	(West Germany) Kohde-Kilsch	6	6
(France) Tanvier	1	0
(United States) Na	1	6	4
(United Kingdom) Durie	6	1	6
Q	(United States) Hakami	4	4
(United States) Benjamin	6	6
(Peru) Gildemeister	3	1
9	(Bulgaria) M Maleeva	6	6

Third round
6	(West Germany) Kohde-Kilsch	6	6
(United Kingdom) Durie	2	3
(United States) Benjamin	6^{3}	3
9	(Bulgaria) M Maleeva	7^{7}	6

Fourth round
6	(West Germany) Kohde-Kilsch	2	6	6^{1}
9	(Bulgaria) M Maleeva	6	2	7^{7}

==== Section 8 ====
First round
14	(Sweden) Lindqvist	6	6
(United States) Spence	1	2
(Australia) Dingwall	7^{8}	7^{10}
(United States) G Fernández	6^{6}	6^{8}
(Denmark) Scheuer-Larsen	6	6
(Brazil) Monteiro	2	4
(United States) Mochizuki	6	7^{7}
(United States) Mundel	3	6^{4}
(West Germany) Hanika	7^{7}	6
(United States) White	6^{1}	2
(United States) MJ Fernández	3	6	6
(Italy) Garrone	6	1	3
(Czechoslovakia) Maršíková	0	6	6
(Switzerland) Krapl	6	3	4
2	(United States) Evert	6	6
(United States) Gerken	2	1

Second round
14	(Sweden) Lindqvist	6	6
(Australia) Dingwall	2	3
(Denmark) Scheuer-Larsen	6	6
(United States) Mochizuki	1	3
(West Germany) Hanika	2	2
(United States) MJ Fernández	6	6
(Czechoslovakia) Maršíková	0	0
2	(United States) Evert	6	6

Third round
14	(Sweden) Lindqvist	3	6	6
(Denmark) Scheuer-Larsen	6	2	0
(United States) M J Fernández	4	2
2	(United States) Evert	6	6

Fourth round
14	(Sweden) Lindqvist	2	6	2
2	(United States) Evert	6	2	6

Preceded by 1986 Wimbledon Championships – Women's singles	Grand Slam women's singles	Succeeded by 1987 Australian Open – Women's singles
