= 1985 US Open – Mixed doubles =

Mixed doubles
- 1985 US Open

Final
- Champions: (United States) Martina Navratilova (Switzerland) Heinz Günthardt
- Runners-up: (Australia) Elizabeth Smylie (Australia) John Fitzgerald
- Score: 6–3, 6–4

Details
- Draw: 32
- Seeds: 8

Events
Singles	men	women		boys	girls
Doubles	men	women	mixed	boys	girls
WC Singles	men	women	quad
WC Doubles	men	women	quad
Legends	men	women	mixed
- US Open

Manuela Maleeva and Tom Gullikson were the defending champions but lost in the second round to Kathleen Horvath and Leif Shiras.

Martina Navratilova and Heinz Günthardt won in the final 6–3, 6–4 against Elizabeth Smylie and John Fitzgerald.

== Seeds ==
Champion seeds are indicated in bold text while text in italics indicates the round in which those seeds were eliminated.

1. (United States) **Martina Navratilova** / (Switzerland) **Heinz Günthardt (champions)**
2. (Australia) Elizabeth Smylie / (Australia) John Fitzgerald (final)
3. (Australia) Wendy Turnbull / (United Kingdom) John Lloyd (semifinals)
4. (United States) Kathy Jordan / (United States) Steve Denton (first round)
5. (United States) Paula Smith / (United States) Gary Donnelly (quarterfinals)
6. (Bulgaria) Manuela Maleeva / (United States) Tom Gullikson (second round)
7. (Czechoslovakia) Hana Mandlíková / (Romania) Ilie Năstase (second round)
8. (Peru) Laura Gildemeister / (Chile) Hans Gildemeister (first round)

== Draw ==
Key

- Q = Qualifier
- WC = Wild card
- LL = Lucky loser
- Alt = Alternate
- ITF = ITF entry
- PR = Protected ranking
- SR = Special ranking
- SE = Special exempt
- JE = Junior exempt
- JR = Junior Accelerator Programme entrant
- CO = College Accelerator Programme entrant
- NG = Next Gen Accelerator Program entrant
- w/o = Walkover
- r = Retired
- d = Defaulted

=== Final ===
Final
1	(United States) **Martina Navratilova** (Switzerland) **Heinz Günthardt**	**6**	**6**
2	(Australia) Elizabeth Smylie (Australia) John Fitzgerald	3	4

=== Top half ===
First round
1	(United States) **M Navratilova** (Switzerland) **H Günthardt**	**6**	**6**
(Brazil) P Medrado (Brazil) G Barbosa	1	4
(United States) H Crowe (Australia) B Dyke	4	6
(United States) **P Barg** (Israel) **S Perkiss**	**6**	**7**
(United States) P Casale (Australia) D Graham	3	3
(United Kingdom) **V Wade** (Australia) **K Warwick**	**6**	**6**
(United States) P Louie (United States) M Mitchell	1	4
7	(Czechoslovakia) **H Mandlíková** (Romania) **I Năstase**	**6**	**6**
4	(United States) K Jordan (United States) S Denton	2	4
(South Africa) **I Kloss** (United States) **S Meister**	**6**	**6**
(United States) **J Russell** (United States) **D Gitlin**	**6**	**6**
(United States) E Burgin (United States) M Bauer	2	2
(United States) C Reynolds (United States) T Delatte	6	**6**	6
(United States) **K Horvath** (United States) **L Shiras**	**7**	3	**7**
(United States) B Gadusek (Australia) M Fancutt	6	**7**	6
6	(Bulgaria) **M Maleeva** (United States) **T Gullikson**	**7**	6	**7**

Second round
1	(United States) **M Navratilova** (Switzerland) **H Günthardt**	**6**	**6**
(United States) P Barg (Israel) S Perkiss	2	3
(United Kingdom) **V Wade** (Australia) **K Warwick**	6	**6**	**7**
7	(Czechoslovakia) H Mandlíková (Romania) I Năstase	**7**	4	5
(South Africa) I Kloss (United States) S Meister	**6**	5	3
(United States) **J Russell** (United States) **D Gitlin**	3	**7**	**6**
(United States) **K Horvath** (United States) **L Shiras**	**6**	**6**
6	(Bulgaria) M Maleeva (United States) T Gullikson	4	2

Quarterfinals
1	(United States) **M Navratilova** (Switzerland) **H Günthardt**	**6**	3	**6**
(United Kingdom) V Wade (Australia) K Warwick	3	**6**	3
(United States) J Russell (United States) D Gitlin	6	**7**	3
(United States) **K Horvath** (United States) **L Shiras**	**7**	6	**6**

Semifinals
1	(United States) **M Navratilova** (Switzerland) **H Günthardt**	**6**	**6**
(United States) K Horvath (United States) L Shiras	4	2

=== Bottom half ===
First round
8	(Peru) L Gildemeister (Chile) Ha Gildemeister
(United States) **Z Garrison** (United States) **M Freeman**	w/o
(Canada) J Hetherington (Chile) R Acuña	3	4
(West Germany) **B Bunge** (Chile) **He Gildemeister**	**6**	**6**
(Brazil) C Monteiro (Brazil) C Motta	4	5
(United States) **R White** (United States) **B Walts**	**6**	**7**
(Bulgaria) K Maleeva (United States) C Strode	2	4
3	(Australia) **W Turnbull** (United Kingdom) **J Lloyd**	**6**	**6**
5	(United States) **P Smith** (United States) **G Donnelly**	**6**	**6**
(United States) S Mascarin (United States) M Purcell	4	4
(United States) K Shaefer (United States) H Pfister	**6**	6	2
(Australia) **P Whytcross** (Australia) **M Edmondson**	2	**7**	**6**
(United States) R Casals (Australia) J Alexander	3	**6**	3
(United States) **M-L Piatek** (United States) **C Dunk**	**6**	3	**6**
(United States) S Walsh-Pete (United States) M Davis	4	4
2	(Australia) **E Smylie** (Australia) **J Fitzgerald**	**6**	**6**

Second round
(United States) **Z Garrison** (United States) **M Freeman**	**7**	**6**
(West Germany) B Bunge (Chile) He Gildemeister	6	4
(United States) R White (United States) B Walts	5	**7**	1
3	(Australia) **W Turnbull** (United Kingdom) **J Lloyd**	**7**	6	**6**
5	(United States) **P Smith** (United States) **G Donnelly**	**6**	6	**6**
(Australia) P Whytcross (Australia) M Edmondson	2	**7**	4
(United States) M-L Piatek (United States) C Dunk	5	3
2	(Australia) **E Smylie** (Australia) **J Fitzgerald**	**7**	**6**

Quarterfinals
(United States) Z Garrison (United States) M Freeman	4	4
3	(Australia) **W Turnbull** (United Kingdom) **J Lloyd**	**6**	**6**
5	(United States) P Smith (United States) G Donnelly	2	5
2	(Australia) **E Smylie** (Australia) **J Fitzgerald**	**6**	**7**

Semifinals
3	(Australia) W Turnbull (United Kingdom) J Lloyd	4	3
2	(Australia) **E Smylie** (Australia) **J Fitzgerald**	**6**	**6**
