= 1986 US Open – Men's doubles =

Men's doubles
- 1986 US Open

Final
- Champion: (Ecuador) Andrés Gómez (Socialist Federal Republic of Yugoslavia) Slobodan Živojinović
- Runner-up: (Sweden) Joakim Nyström (Sweden) Mats Wilander
- Score: 4–6, 6–3, 6–3, 4–6, 6–3

Details
- Draw: 64
- Seeds: 16

Events
Singles	men	women		boys	girls
Doubles	men	women	mixed	boys	girls
WC Singles	men	women	quad
WC Doubles	men	women	quad
Legends	men	women	mixed
← 1985 ·	US Open	· 1987 →

The men's doubles tournament at the 1986 US Open was held from August 26 to September 7, 1986, on the outdoor hard courts at the USTA National Tennis Center in New York City, United States. Andrés Gómez and Slobodan Živojinović won the title, defeating Joakim Nyström and Mats Wilander in the final.

== Draw ==
=== Key ===
- Q = Qualifier
- WC = Wild card
- LL = Lucky loser
- Alt = Alternate
- ITF = ITF entry
- PR = Protected ranking
- SR = Special ranking
- SE = Special exempt
- JE = Junior exempt
- JR = Junior Accelerator Programme entrant
- CO = College Accelerator Programme entrant
- NG = Next Gen Accelerator Program entrant
- w/o = Walkover
- r = Retired
- d = Defaulted

=== Finals ===
Quarterfinals
1	(France) Guy Forget (France) Yannick Noah	6	6	6	3
(South Africa) Gary Muller (United States) Todd Nelson	4	7	7	6
4	(Ecuador) Andrés Gómez (Socialist Federal Republic of Yugoslavia) Slobodan Živojinović	6	6	6
11	(United States) Mike De Palmer (United States) Gary Donnelly	4	4	4
12	(Australia) Mark Edmondson (United States) Sherwood Stewart	6	2	2
3	(Sweden) Joakim Nyström (Sweden) Mats Wilander	7	6	6
(South Africa) Michael Robertson (United States) Tomm Warneke	2	6	7	4
16	(United States) Kevin Curren (United States) Matt Mitchell	6	7	6	6

Semifinals
(South Africa) Gary Muller (United States) Todd Nelson	6	6	6	3
4	(Ecuador) Andrés Gómez (Socialist Federal Republic of Yugoslavia) Slobodan Živojinović	4	7	7	6
3	(Sweden) Joakim Nyström (Sweden) Mats Wilander	6	2	7	2	7
16	(United States) Kevin Curren (United States) Matt Mitchell	2	6	5	6	6

Final
4	(Ecuador) Andrés Gómez (Socialist Federal Republic of Yugoslavia) Slobodan Živojinović	4	6	6	4	6
3	(Sweden) Joakim Nyström (Sweden) Mats Wilander	6	3	3	6	3

=== Top half ===
==== Section 1 ====
First round
1	(France) G Forget (France) Y Noah	7	6
(United Kingdom) C Dowdeswell (Australia) M Fancutt	1	4
(United States) Ti Gullikson (United States) To Gullikson	6	2
WC	(Sweden) K Carlsson (Sweden) U Stenlund	7	6
(United States) B Levine (Australia) L Warder	6	3	3
(United States) D Dowlen (United States) T Moor	4	6	6
(Sweden) P Lundgren (Sweden) J Svensson	3	6	4
15	(United States) C Hooper (United States) M Leach	6	4	6
10	(United States) A Kohlberg (United States) R Van't Hof	4	2
(South Africa) G Muller (United States) T Nelson	6	6
(United States) J Levine (United States) B Pearce	2	5
(Denmark) M Mortensen (Sweden) H Simonsson	6	7
(Australia) D Cahill (Australia) M Kratzmann	6	6	3
(United States) B Cox (Nigeria) N Odizor	4	7	6
(Mexico) J Lozano (United States) T Witsken	6	1	4
7	(Australia) J Fitzgerald (Czechoslovakia) T Šmíd	3	6	6

Second round
1	(France) G Forget (France) Y Noah	6	6
WC	(Sweden) K Carlsson (Sweden) U Stenlund	3	2
(United States) D Dowlen (United States) T Moor	6	2	6
15	(United States) C Hooper (United States) M Leach	4	6	2
(South Africa) G Muller (United States) T Nelson	7	4	7
(Denmark) M Mortensen (Sweden) H Simonsson	6	6	5
(United States) B Cox (Nigeria) N Odizor	2	2
7	(Australia) J Fitzgerald (Czechoslovakia) T Šmíd	6	6

Third round
1	(France) G Forget (France) Y Noah	6	6	7
(United States) D Dowlen (United States) T Moor	7	4	5
(South Africa) G Muller (United States) T Nelson	6	7
7	(Australia) J Fitzgerald (Czechoslovakia) T Šmíd	4	5

Quarterfinals
1	(France) G Forget (France) Y Noah	6	6	6	3
(South Africa) G Muller (United States) T Nelson	4	7	7	6

==== Section 2 ====
First round
4	(Ecuador) A Gómez (Socialist Federal Republic of Yugoslavia) S Živojinović	7	6
(Haiti) R Agénor (Iran) M Bahrami	6	4
(Austria) A Antonitsch (Austria) T Muster	6	3	6
(Mexico) L Lavalle (Israel) A Mansdorf	2	6	1
(United States) S Giammalva (United States) G Holmes	1	1
(New Zealand) K Evernden (United States) T Wilkison	6	6
(South Africa) C Steyn (South Africa) D Visser	6	6
LL	(United States) R Rudeen (United States) D Tarr	4	4
11	(United States) M De Palmer (United States) G Donnelly	6	6	6
(Sweden) J Gunnarsson (Sweden) M Pernfors	4	7	4
(Australia) D Graham (United States) B Testerman	7	6
(South Africa) C Campbell (United States) J Rive	5	4
(United States) L Bourne (France) T Tulasne	1	5
(Brazil) C Kirmayr (Brazil) C Motta	6	7
(United States) M Flur (United States) K Richter	4	6	6
LL	(United States) B Dickinson (United States) R Nixon	6	3	3

Second round
4	(Ecuador) A Gómez (Socialist Federal Republic of Yugoslavia) S Živojinović	7	6
(Austria) A Antonitsch (Austria) T Muster	5	3
(New Zealand) K Evernden (United States) T Wilkison	4	5
(South Africa) C Steyn (South Africa) D Visser	6	7
11	(United States) M De Palmer (United States) G Donnelly	6	7
(Australia) D Graham (United States) B Testerman	2	6
(Brazil) C Kirmayr (Brazil) C Motta	3	6	7
LL	(United States) B Dickinson (United States) R Nixon	6	2	6

Third round
4	(Ecuador) A Gómez (Socialist Federal Republic of Yugoslavia) S Živojinović	6	6	6
(South Africa) C Steyn (South Africa) D Visser	3	7	4
11	(United States) M De Palmer (United States) G Donnelly	6	6
(Brazil) C Kirmayr (Brazil) C Motta	1	4

Quarterfinals
4	(Ecuador) A Gómez (Socialist Federal Republic of Yugoslavia) S Živojinović	6	6	6
11	(United States) M De Palmer (United States) G Donnelly	4	4	4

=== Bottom half ===
==== Section 3 ====
First round
6	(United States) P Annacone (South Africa) C van Rensburg	7	6
(United States) J Arias (United States) B Gilbert	2	6
(United Kingdom) J Bates (Finland) O Rahnasto	4	6	7
WC	(United States) M Anger (United States) H Pfister	6	2	6
(Czechoslovakia) M Mečíř (Czechoslovakia) L Pimek	6	6
(Brazil) R Acioly (Poland) W Fibak	4	4
(United States) D Cassidy (United States) M Purcell	6	3	0
12	(Australia) M Edmondson (United States) S Stewart	1	6	6
13	(Switzerland) J Hlasek (Czechoslovakia) P Složil	4	6	4
(South Africa) E Edwards (Paraguay) F González	6	4	6
(United States) G Layendecker (Canada) G Michibata	6	6
(Brazil) N Aerts (Brazil) L Mattar	7	7
(Denmark) M Christensen (United States) J Pugh	4	6	4
WC	(United States) R Leach (United States) T Pawsat	6	4	6
(Israel) S Glickstein (Israel) S Perkiss	1	3
3	(Sweden) J Nyström (Sweden) M Wilander	6	6

Second round
6	(United States) P Annacone (South Africa) C van Rensburg	6	4	7
(United Kingdom) J Bates (Finland) O Rahnasto	1	6	5
(Czechoslovakia) M Mečíř (Czechoslovakia) L Pimek	7	4	3
12	(Australia) M Edmondson (United States) S Stewart	5	6	6
(South Africa) E Edwards (Paraguay) F González	7	6
(Brazil) N Aerts (Brazil) L Mattar	6	4
WC	(United States) R Leach (United States) T Pawsat	6	5
3	(Sweden) J Nyström (Sweden) M Wilander	7	7

Third round
6	(United States) P Annacone (South Africa) C van Rensburg	4	3
12	(Australia) M Edmondson (United States) S Stewart	6	6
(South Africa) E Edwards (Paraguay) F González	3	4
3	(Sweden) J Nyström (Sweden) M Wilander	6	6

Quarterfinals
(Australia) M Edmondson (United States) S Stewart	6	2	2
3	(Sweden) J Nyström (Sweden) M Wilander	7	6	6

==== Section 4 ====
First round
8	(Spain) S Casal (Spain) E Sánchez	5	4
WC	(United States) P McEnroe (United States) K Jones	7	6
(United States) S Denton (Australia) K Warwick	6	6	6
(Chile) R Acuña (United States) B Green	4	7	3
(United States) M Davis (United States) B Schultz	4	6	3
(South Africa) M Robertson (United States) T Warneke	6	4	6
(Australia) B Dyke (Australia) W Masur	4	4
9	(United States) S Davis (United States) D Pate	6	6
16	(United States) K Curren (United States) M Mitchell	6	6
(Greece) G Kalovelonis (United States) J Letts	3	2
WC	(United States) C Dunk (United States) E Teltscher	7	2	6
(Australia) P McNamara (Australia) P McNamee	5	6	3
(United States) C Kennedy (Australia) D Tyson	6	3	6
(United States) J Kriek (United Kingdom) J Lloyd	3	6	7
(United States) S Meister (United States) B Willenborg	5	3
2	(Sweden) S Edberg (Sweden) A Järryd	7	6

Second round
WC	(United States) P McEnroe (United States) K Jones	3	6	6
(United States) S Denton (Australia) K Warwick	6	1	1
(South Africa) M Robertson (United States) T Warneke	6	6
9	(United States) S Davis (United States) D Pate	2	3
16	(United States) K Curren (United States) M Mitchell	6	3	6
WC	(United States) C Dunk (United States) E Teltscher	0	6	3
(United States) J Kriek (United Kingdom) J Lloyd	6	7
2	(Sweden) S Edberg (Sweden) A Järryd	3	6

Third round
WC	(United States) P McEnroe (United States) K Jones	3	6	4
(South Africa) M Robertson (United States) T Warneke	6	3	6
16	(United States) K Curren (United States) M Mitchell	7	6
(United States) J Kriek (United Kingdom) J Lloyd	6	2

Quarterfinals
(South Africa) M Robertson (United States) T Warneke	2	6	7	4
16	(United States) K Curren (United States) M Mitchell	6	7	6	6
