= 1985 US Open – Women's singles =

Women's singles
- 1985 US Open

Final
- Champion: (Czechoslovakia) Hana Mandlíková
- Runner-up: (United States) Martina Navratilova
- Score: 7–6^{(7–3)}, 1–6, 7–6^{(7–2)}

Details
- Draw: 128
- Seeds: 16

Events
Singles	men	women		boys	girls
Doubles	men	women	mixed	boys	girls
WC Singles	men	women	quad
WC Doubles	men	women	quad
Legends	men	women	mixed
← 1984 ·	US Open	· 1986 →

Hana Mandlíková defeated two-time defending champion Martina Navratilova in the final, 7–6^{(7–3)}, 1–6, 7–6^{(7–2)} to win the women's singles tennis title at the 1985 US Open. It was her third major singles title. With the win, Mandlíková ended Navratilova and Chris Evert's record steak of 15 consecutive major titles between them.

== Seeds ==
1. (United States) Chris Evert (semifinals)
2. (United States) Martina Navratilova (final)
3. (Czechoslovakia) Hana Mandlíková (champion)
4. (United States) Pam Shriver (quarterfinals)
5. (West Germany) Claudia Kohde-Kilsch (quarterfinals)
6. (United States) Zina Garrison (quarterfinals)
7. (Czechoslovakia) Helena Suková (quarterfinals)
8. (Bulgaria) Manuela Maleeva (fourth round)
9. (United States) Kathy Rinaldi (first round)
10. (Argentina) Gabriela Sabatini (first round)
11. (West Germany) Steffi Graf (semifinals)
12. (Australia) Wendy Turnbull (fourth round)
13. (Sweden) Catarina Lindqvist (fourth round)
14. (United States) Bonnie Gadusek (third round)
15. (Canada) Carling Bassett (fourth round)
16. (Hungary) Andrea Temesvári (second round)

== Draw ==
=== Key ===
- Q = Qualifier
- WC = Wild card
- LL = Lucky loser
- Alt = Alternate
- ITF = ITF entry
- PR = Protected ranking
- SR = Special ranking
- SE = Special exempt
- JE = Junior exempt
- JR = Junior Accelerator Programme entrant
- CO = College Accelerator Programme entrant
- NG = Next Gen Accelerator Program entrant
- w/o = Walkover
- r = Retired
- d = Defaulted

=== Final eight ===
Quarterfinals
1	(United States) Chris Evert	6	6
5	(West Germany) Claudia Kohde-Kilsch	3	3
3	(Czechoslovakia) Hana Mandlíková	7^{7}	7
7	(Czechoslovakia) Helena Suková	6^{4}	5
11	(West Germany) Steffi Graf	7^{7}	6^{4}	7^{7}
4	(United States) Pam Shriver	6^{4}	7^{7}	6^{4}
6	(United States) Zina Garrison	2	3
2	(United States) Martina Navratilova	6	6

Semifinals
1	(United States) Chris Evert	6	2	3
3	(Czechoslovakia) Hana Mandlíková	4	6	6
11	(West Germany) Steffi Graf	2	3
2	(United States) Martina Navratilova	6	6

Final
3	(Czechoslovakia) Hana Mandlíková	7^{7}	1	7^{7}
2	(United States) Martina Navratilova	6^{3}	6	6^{2}

=== Earlier rounds ===
==== Section 1 ====
First round
1	(United States) Evert	6	6
(Australia) Thompson	1	3
(Italy) Reggi	4	6	6
(Sweden) Karlsson	6	3	3
(United States) Piatek	6	6
(Switzerland) Jolissaint	2	4
(United States) Kim	6	6
(West Germany) Bunge	4	4
(United States) White	0	7^{10}	6
(France) Tanvier	6	6^{8}	4
(West Germany) Keppeler	6	3	6
(West Germany) Betzner	1	6	3
(Socialist Federal Republic of Yugoslavia) Jaušovec	7	6
(Australia) Balestrat	5	1
14	(United States) Gadusek	6	7
(United States) G Fernández	2	5

Second round
1	(United States) Evert	6	6
(Italy) Reggi	0	3
(United States) Piatek	6^{5}	6^{5}
(United States) Kim	7^{7}	7^{7}
(United States) White	6	6
(West Germany) Keppeler	2	2
(Socialist Federal Republic of Yugoslavia) Jaušovec	0	6	2
14	(United States) Gadusek	6	4	6

Third round
1	(United States) Evert	6	6
(United States) Kim	0	2
(United States) White	1	6	6
14	(United States) Gadusek	6	1	2

Fourth round
1	(United States) Evert	6	6
(United States) White	2	4

==== Section 2 ====
First round
12	(Australia) Turnbull	6	6
(Romania) Ruzici	4	1
(United States) Herr	6	6
WC	(United States) Walsh-Pete	3	2
(United States) Torres	7^{8}	6^{4}	6
(United States) Shaefer	6^{6}	7^{7}	2
(Czechoslovakia) Skronská	6	6^{8}	6
(France) Amiach	4	7^{10}	2
(United States) Henricksson	6	6
(United States) Horvath	0	4
(United States) M J Fernández	6	6
(United Kingdom) Gomer	1	4
(Argentina) Villagrán	7^{9}	3	6
(Greece) Kanellopoulou	6^{7}	6	4
5	(West Germany) Kohde-Kilsch	7^{7}	6
(Brazil) Dias	6^{4}	1

Second round
12	(Australia) Turnbull	7	6
(United States) Herr	5	2
(United States) Torres	3	6	6
(Czechoslovakia) Skronská	6	2	0
(United States) Henricksson	6	6
(United States) M J Fernández	1	4
(Argentina) Villagrán	1	1
5	(West Germany) Kohde-Kilsch	6	6

Third round
12	(Australia) Turnbull	7^{7}	6
(United States) Torres	6^{3}	1
(United States) Henricksson	3	4
5	(West Germany) Kohde-Kilsch	6	6

Fourth round
12	(Australia) Turnbull	7	5	2
5	(West Germany) Kohde-Kilsch	5	7	6

==== Section 3 ====
First round
3	(Czechoslovakia) Mandlíková	6	6
(United Kingdom) Brown	2	1
(United Kingdom) Croft	6	7
(Czechoslovakia) Skuherská	1	5
(United States) Allen	6	6
(France) Suire	4	2
(West Germany) Hanika	7	6
(South Africa) Fairbank	5	3
(United States) Jordan	2	6	6
(Netherlands) Mesker	6	1	2
(United States) Jaeger	7	2	6
(Peru) Gildemeister	5	6	1
(United States) Phelps	6	6
(United States) Rehe	1	4
(United States) Potter	6	6
10	(Argentina) Sabatini	4	2

Second round
3	(Czechoslovakia) Mandlíková	6	6
(United Kingdom) Croft	3	3
(United States) Allen	0	0
(West Germany) Hanika	6	6
(United States) Jordan	3	6	6
(United States) Jaeger	6	2	2
(United States) Phelps	5	7	6
(United States) Potter	7	5	3

Third round
3	(Czechoslovakia) Mandlíková	6	6
(West Germany) Hanika	3	4
(United States) Jordan	7	6
(United States) Phelps	5	1

Fourth round
3	(Czechoslovakia) Mandlíková	7	3	6
(United States) Jordan	5	6	1

==== Section 4 ====
First round
15	(Canada) Bassett	6	6^{3}	7
(Czechoslovakia) Budařová	0	7^{7}	5
(Argentina) Paz	0	6	6
(United States) Nelson	6	1	0
WC	(United States) Gates	6	6
(United States) Antonoplis	4	2
WC	(United States) Spain-Short	6	6
Q	(United States) A-M Fernandez	3	4
(United States) Benjamin	6	6
(France) Demongeot	4	3
(Italy) Garrone	6	6
Q	(United States) Jordan	2	4
WC	(United States) Bowes	6	6
Q	(United States) Sloane	4	3
7	(Czechoslovakia) Suková	6	6
LL	(United States) Mundel	0	1

Second round
15	(Canada) Bassett	6	6
(Argentina) Paz	2	1
WC	(United States) Gates	6	4	6
WC	(United States) Spain-Short	0	6	3
(United States) Benjamin	6	6
(Italy) Garrone	1	2
WC	(United States) Bowes	3	1
7	(Czechoslovakia) Suková	6	6

Third round
15	(Canada) Bassett	6	6
WC	(United States) Gates	4	4
(United States) Benjamin	0	5
7	(Czechoslovakia) Suková	6	7

Fourth round
15	(Canada) Bassett	6	6^{6}	5
7	(Czechoslovakia) Suková	4	7^{8}	7

==== Section 5 ====
First round
8	(Bulgaria) M Maleeva	6	6
(United States) Mascarin	1	1
(West Germany) Cueto	6	7
WC	(United States) Klitch	3	5
(Austria) Huber	7^{7}	6
(United States) Spence	6^{3}	1
(United States) Burgin	6	6
(South Africa) Vermaak	0	1
(United States) White	6	2	6
(Canada) Kelesi	3	6	4
(United States) Foltz	7^{11}	6
(United States) Louie	6^{9}	3
(Australia) Anne Minter	6	6
(Australia) Elizabeth Minter	3	4
11	(West Germany) Graf	4	6	7
(United States) Fendick	6	1	5

Second round
8	(Bulgaria) M Maleeva	6	7^{7}
(West Germany) Cueto	0	6^{5}
(Austria) Huber	4	4
(United States) Burgin	6	6
(United States) White	6	6
(United States) Foltz	4	1
(Australia) Minter	3	6^{4}
11	(West Germany) Graf	6	7^{7}

Third round
8	(Bulgaria) M Maleeva	6	7
(United States) Burgin	4	5
(United States) White	4	2
11	(West Germany) Graf	6	6

Fourth round
8	(Bulgaria) M Maleeva	2	2
11	(West Germany) Graf	6	6

==== Section 6 ====
First round
16	(Hungary) Temesvári	6	4	6
(Bulgaria) K Maleeva	2	6	4
Q	(United States) Kuhlman	6	6
(United States) McNeil	1	3
(United States) Moulton	6	7
(South Africa) Mould	2	5
(Socialist Federal Republic of Yugoslavia) Goleš	6^{5}	6	7^{7}
(South Africa) Uys	7^{7}	1	6^{4}
(United States) Casals	1
(United States) Nagelsen	0	r
(United Kingdom) Hobbs	7	6
(United Kingdom) Durie	5	1
(United States) Na	6	6
(West Germany) Pfaff	4	4
4	(United States) Shriver	6	6
(Denmark) Scheuer-Larsen	3	3

Second round
16	(Hungary) Temesvári	6	2	2
Q	(United States) Kuhlman	2	6	6
(United States) Moulton	7	6
(Socialist Federal Republic of Yugoslavia) Goleš	5	4
(United States) Casals	6	3	6^{7}
(United Kingdom) Hobbs	2	6	7^{9}
(United States) Na	2	6^{5}
4	(United States) Shriver	6	7^{7}

Third round
Q	(United States) Kuhlman	4	6	6^{5}
(United States) Moulton	6	1	7^{7}
(United Kingdom) Hobbs	2	3
4	(United States) Shriver	6	6

Fourth round
(United States) Moulton	2	4
4	(United States) Shriver	6	6

==== Section 7 ====
First round
6	(United States) Garrison	7	6
(United States) Gerken	5	3
(United States) Casale	6	6
Q	(United States) Rossides	3	2
Q	(United States) Werdel	6	6
(West Germany) Schropp	2	4
(New Zealand) Cordwell	6	6
Q	(Sweden) Lindström	3	4
(United States) Gompert	6	6
(Brazil) Medrado	3	4
Q	(Canada) Young	7^{7}	6
WC	(United States) Russell	6^{5}	3
(Switzerland) Drescher	6	6
WC	(United States) Holladay	0	2
(Czechoslovakia) Holíková	7^{7}	7^{8}
9	(United States) Rinaldi	6^{3}	6^{6}

Second round
6	(United States) Garrison	6	6
(United States) Casale	2	4
Q	(United States) Werdel	2	6^{2}
(New Zealand) Cordwell	6	7^{7}
(United States) Gompert	6	6
Q	(Canada) Young	3	1
(Switzerland) Drescher	3	6	4
(Czechoslovakia) Holíková	6	2	6

Third round
6	(United States) Garrison	6	6
(New Zealand) Cordwell	4	4
(United States) Gompert	6	7^{7}
(Czechoslovakia) Holíková	4	6^{2}

Fourth round
6	(United States) Garrison	6	6
(United States) Gompert	3	2

==== Section 8 ====
First round
13	(Sweden) Lindqvist	6	6
(United States) Gurney	1	0
(United States) Holton	5	6	6
(Australia) Smylie	7	4	1
(United States) Thompson	6	3	6
WC	(United States) Collins	1	6	1
(Czechoslovakia) Maršíková	6	6
(United States) Raponi-Longo	3	2
(United States) Van Nostrand	7^{8}	6
(United States) White	6^{6}	1
(Italy) Cecchini	2	6	6
(Japan) Inoue	6	1	2
(United States) Bonder	6	4	6
(United States) Ivan	2	6	3
2	(United States) Navratilova	6	6
(France) Paradis	2	1

Second round
13	(Sweden) Lindqvist	6	6
(United States) Holton	1	2
(United States) Thompson	6	2
(Czechoslovakia) Maršíková	4	5	r
(United States) Van Nostrand	4	4
(Italy) Cecchini	6	6
(United States) Bonder	1	1
2	(United States) Navratilova	6	6

Third round
13	(Sweden) Lindqvist	7	6
(United States) Thompson	5	0
(Italy) Cecchini	0	1
2	(United States) Navratilova	6	6

Fourth round
13	(Sweden) Lindqvist	4	5
2	(United States) Navratilova	6	7

Preceded by 1985 Wimbledon Championships – Women's singles	Grand Slam women's singles	Succeeded by 1985 Australian Open – Women's singles
