= 1986 US Open – Women's doubles =

Women's doubles
- 1986 US Open

Final
- Champions: (United States) Martina Navratilova (United States) Pam Shriver
- Runners-up: (Czechoslovakia) Hana Mandlíková (Australia) Wendy Turnbull
- Score: 6–4, 3–6, 6–3

Details
- Draw: 64
- Seeds: 16

Events
Singles	men	women		boys	girls
Doubles	men	women	mixed	boys	girls
WC Singles	men	women	quad
WC Doubles	men	women	quad
Legends	men	women	mixed
← 1985 ·	US Open	· 1987 →

Claudia Kohde-Kilsch and Helena Suková were the defending champions but lost in the quarterfinals to Elise Burgin and Rosalyn Fairbank.

Martina Navratilova and Pam Shriver won in the final 6–4, 3–6, 6–3 against Hana Mandlíková and Wendy Turnbull.

== Seeds ==
Champion seeds are indicated in bold text while text in italics indicates the round in which those seeds were eliminated.

1. (United States) **Martina Navratilova** / (United States) **Pam Shriver (champions)**
2. (West Germany) Claudia Kohde-Kilsch / (Czechoslovakia) Helena Suková (quarterfinals)
3. (Czechoslovakia) Hana Mandlíková / (Australia) Wendy Turnbull (final)
4. (West Germany) Steffi Graf / (Argentina) Gabriela Sabatini (semifinals)
5. (United States) Kathy Jordan / (Australia) Elizabeth Smylie (quarterfinals)
6. (United States) Elise Burgin / (South Africa) Rosalyn Fairbank (semifinals)
7. (United States) Gigi Fernández / (United States) Robin White (quarterfinals)
8. (United States) Zina Garrison / (United States) Kathy Rinaldi (quarterfinals)
9. (West Germany) Eva Pfaff / (Hungary) Andrea Temesvári (third round)
10. (United States) Betsy Nagelsen / (United States) JoAnne Russell (third round)
11. (United States) Alycia Moulton / (United States) Anne White (third round)
12. (United States) Candy Reynolds / (United States) Anne Smith (third round)
13. (Canada) Carling Bassett / (United States) Bonnie Gadusek (second round)
14. (United States) Lori McNeil / (France) Catherine Suire (third round)
15. (United States) Terry Holladay / (United States) Sharon Walsh-Pete (first round)
16. (United States) Patty Fendick / (Canada) Jill Hetherington (third round)

== Draw ==
=== Key ===
- Q = Qualifier
- WC = Wild card
- LL = Lucky loser
- Alt = Alternate
- SE = Special exempt
- PR = Protected ranking
- ITF = ITF entry
- JE = Junior exempt
- w/o = Walkover
- r = Retired
- d = Defaulted
- SR = Special ranking

=== Finals ===
Semifinals
1	(United States) Martina Navratilova (United States) Pam Shriver	6	6
4	(West Germany) Steffi Graf (Argentina) Gabriela Sabatini	3	1
3	(Czechoslovakia) Hana Mandlíková (Australia) Wendy Turnbull	4	7^{8}	6
6	(United States) Elise Burgin (South Africa) Rosalyn Fairbank	6	6^{6}	0

Final
1	(United States) Martina Navratilova (United States) Pam Shriver	6	3	6
3	(Czechoslovakia) Hana Mandlíková (Australia) Wendy Turnbull	4	6	3

=== Top half ===
==== Section 1 ====
First round
1	(United States) M Navratilova (United States) P Shriver	6	6
(West Germany) B Bunge (West Germany) C Porwik	2	2
(Sweden) C Lindqvist (Sweden) M Lindström	4	6^{4}
(United States) K Horvath (United States) T Phelps	6	7^{7}
(United States) J Kaplan (United States) J Martín	2	5
(United States) P Casale (United States) M-L Piatek	6	7
(United States) K McDaniel (United States) W White	2	5
10	(United States) B Nagelsen (United States) J Russell	6	7
15	(United States) T Holladay (United States) S Walsh-Pete	6^{3}	3
(Czechoslovakia) A Holíková (Czechoslovakia) R Maršíková	7^{7}	6
(Czechoslovakia) I Budařová (Czechoslovakia) M Skuherská	6	6
(United States) P Barg (United States) B Herr	3	2
(South Africa) E Reinach (South Africa) M Reinach	3	2
(Switzerland) L Drescher (France) C Tanvier	6	6
(West Germany) A Betzner (United States) M Gurney	0	0
5	(United States) K Jordan (Australia) E Smylie	6	6

Second round
1	(United States) M Navratilova (United States) P Shriver	6	6
(United States) K Horvath (United States) T Phelps	2	3
(United States) P Casale (United States) M-L Piatek	5	4
10	(United States) B Nagelsen (United States) J Russell	7	6
(Czechoslovakia) A Holíková (Czechoslovakia) R Maršíková	6	3	7^{8}
(Czechoslovakia) I Budařová (Czechoslovakia) M Skuherská	4	6	6^{6}
(Switzerland) L Drescher (France) C Tanvier	2	2
5	(United States) K Jordan (Australia) E Smylie	6	6

Third round
1	(United States) M Navratilova (United States) P Shriver	6	6
10	(United States) B Nagelsen (United States) J Russell	4	2
(Czechoslovakia) A Holíková (Czechoslovakia) R Maršíková	7^{7}	1	1
5	(United States) K Jordan (Australia) E Smylie	6^{5}	6	6

Quarterfinals
1	(United States) M Navratilova (United States) P Shriver	6	6
5	(United States) K Jordan (Australia) E Smylie	4	4

==== Section 2 ====
First round
4	(West Germany) S Graf (Argentina) G Sabatini	4	6	6
(South Africa) J Mundel (United States) M Van Nostrand	6	3	2
(United States) C Benjamin (United States) H Na	3	6	6
(United States) V Nelson-Dunbar (United States) K Steinmetz	6	1	2
(France) S Amiach (United States) D Farrell	6	6
(Austria) P Huber (Switzerland) E Krapl	3	3
(France) I Demongeot (France) N Tauziat	3	1
11	(United States) A Moulton (United States) A White	6	6
13	(Canada) C Bassett (United States) B Gadusek	3	6	6
(United States) Ca MacGregor (United States) Cy MacGregor	6	1	4
(Italy) S Cecchini (Socialist Federal Republic of Yugoslavia) S Goleš	7	4	6
(New Zealand) B Cordwell (New Zealand) J Richardson	5	6	1
(United States) M J Fernández (Italy) R Reggi	3	6	2
(France) P Paradis (France) N Phan-Thanh	6	2	6
(Bulgaria) K Maleeva (Bulgaria) M Maleeva	1	3
7	(United States) G Fernández (United States) R White	6	6

Second round
4	(West Germany) S Graf (Argentina) G Sabatini	6	6
(United States) C Benjamin (United States) H Na	1	2
(France) S Amiach (United States) D Farrell	3	6^{2}
11	(United States) A Moulton (United States) A White	6	7^{7}
13	(Canada) C Bassett (United States) B Gadusek	7	4	4
(Italy) S Cecchini (Socialist Federal Republic of Yugoslavia) S Goleš	5	6	6
(France) P Paradis (France) N Phan-Thanh	0	3
7	(United States) G Fernández (United States) R White	6	6

Third round
4	(West Germany) S Graf (Argentina) G Sabatini	6	6
11	(United States) A Moulton (United States) R White	4	2
(Italy) S Cecchini (Socialist Federal Republic of Yugoslavia) S Goleš	5	6^{4}
7	(United States) G Fernández (United States) R White	7	7^{7}

Quarterfinals
4	(West Germany) S Graf (Argentina) G Sabatini	6^{5}	6	6
7	(United States) G Fernández (United States) R White	7^{7}	4	3

=== Bottom half ===
==== Section 3 ====
First round
8	(United States) Z Garrison (United States) K Rinaldi	1	6	6
(Argentina) M Paz (United States) S Rehe	6	2	1
(Australia) R Bryant (Australia) S Leo	3	6	6^{2}
(United States) L Allen (United States) J Byrne	6	3	7^{7}
(United Kingdom) J Durie (United Kingdom) A Hobbs	3	6	0
(United States) S Collins (United Kingdom) V Wade	6	4	6
(Australia) M Jaggard (Poland) I Kuczyńska	2	5
9	(West Germany) E Pfaff (Hungary) A Temesvári	6	7
14	(United States) L McNeil (France) C Suire	4	6	6
(South Africa) D van Rensburg (Japan) M Yanagi	6	4	4
(United States) C Copeland (Australia) P Whytcross	6^{5}	7	1
(Switzerland) C Bartos (Argentina) A Villagrán	7^{7}	5	6
(United States) L Bonder (Peru) L Gildemeister	6	7^{7}
(United States) N Sodupe (United States) M Torres	3	6^{5}
(Sweden) C Karlsson (Denmark) T Scheuer-Larsen	4	7^{8}	3
3	(Czechoslovakia) H Mandlíková (Australia) W Turnbull	6	6^{6}	6

Second round
8	(United States) Z Garrison (United States) K Rinaldi	6	6
(United States) L Allen (Australia) J Byrne	1	1
(United States) S Collins (United Kingdom) V Wade	3	3
9	(West Germany) E Pfaff (Hungary) A Temesvári	6	6
14	(United States) L McNeil (France) C Suire	5	6	6
(Switzerland) C Bartos (Argentina) A Villagrán	7	1	3
(United States) L Bonder (Peru) L Gildemeister	2	3
3	(Czechoslovakia) H Mandlíková (Australia) W Turnbull	6	6

Third round
8	(United States) Z Garrison (United States) K Rinaldi	6	6
9	(West Germany) E Pfaff (Hungary) A Temesvári	2	1
14	(United States) L McNeil (France) C Suire	3	4
3	(Czechoslovakia) H Mandlíková (Australia) W Turnbull	6	6

Quarterfinals
8	(United States) Z Garrison (United States) K Rinaldi	1	6^{4}
3	(Czechoslovakia) H Mandlíková (Australia) W Turnbull	6	7^{7}

==== Section 4 ====
First round
6	(United States) E Burgin (South Africa) R Fairbank	6	5	6
(United States) K Adams (United States) C Kuhlman	3	7	2
(United States) B Gerken (United States) S Mascarin	6	6
(United States) A Holton (South Africa) Y Vermaak	1	3
(United States) A M Fernandez (United States) P Harper	2	4
(United States) A Henricksson (Switzerland) C Jolissaint	6	6
(United Kingdom) A Croft (United Kingdom) S Gomer	3	1
16	(United States) P Fendick (Canada) J Hetherington	6	6
12	(United States) C Reynolds (United States) A Smith	6	7^{7}
(Australia) A Minter (Australia) E Minter	4	6^{3}
(United States) R Blount (United States) J Goodling	3	6	5
(Brazil) N Dias (Brazil) P Medrado	6	4	7
(United States) R Casals (United States) K Sands	2	6	6
(United States) L Antonoplis (Brazil) C Monteiro	6	3	4
(United States) G Rush (United States) P Smith	1	0
2	(West Germany) C Kohde-Kilsch (Czechoslovakia) H Suková	6	6

Second round
6	(United States) E Burgin (South Africa) R Fairbank	6	7^{7}
(United States) B Gerken (United States) S Mascarin	0	6^{4}
(United States) A Henricksson (Switzerland) C Jolissaint	6	4	1
16	(United States) P Fendick (Canada) J Hetherington	3	6	6
12	(United States) C Reynolds (United States) A Smith	6	4	6
(Brazil) N Dias (Brazil) P Medrado	3	6	4
(United States) R Casals (United States) K Sands	3	4
2	(West Germany) C Kohde-Kilsch (Czechoslovakia) H Suková	6	6

Third round
6	(United States) E Burgin (South Africa) R Fairbank	6	6
16	(United States) P Fendick (Canada) J Hetherington	4	2
12	(United States) C Reynolds (United States) A Smith	4	3
2	(West Germany) C Kohde-Kilsch (Czechoslovakia) H Suková	6	6

Quarterfinals
6	(United States) E Burgin (South Africa) R Fairbank	6	6
2	(West Germany) C Kohde-Kilsch (Czechoslovakia) H Suková	4	4
