= 1985 US Open – Men's singles =

Men's singles
- 1985 US Open

Final
- Champion: (Czechoslovakia) Ivan Lendl
- Runner-up: (United States) John McEnroe
- Score: 7–6^{(7–1)}, 6–3, 6–4

Details
- Draw: 128
- Seeds: 16

Events
Singles	men	women		boys	girls
Doubles	men	women	mixed	boys	girls
WC Singles	men	women	quad
WC Doubles	men	women	quad
Legends	men	women	mixed
- US Open

Ivan Lendl defeated defending champion John McEnroe in a rematch of the previous year's final, 7–6^{(7–1)}, 6–3, 6–4 to win the men's singles tennis title at the 1985 US Open. It was his first US Open title, following three consecutive runner-up finishes at the tournament, and second major title overall.

This tournament marked the final major appearance of former world No. 1, 1972 US Open and 1973 French Open champion Ilie Năstase; he lost to Mike Bauer in the first round. It also marked the first US Open appearance of future world No. 1 and champion Boris Becker, who would win the title 4 years later; he lost to Joakim Nyström in the fourth round.

== Seeds ==
The seeded players are listed below. Ivan Lendl is the champion; others show the round in which they were eliminated.

1. (United States) John McEnroe (finalist)
2. (Czechoslovakia) Ivan Lendl (champion)
3. (Sweden) Mats Wilander (semifinalist)
4. (United States) Jimmy Connors (semifinalist)
5. (United States) Kevin Curren (first round)
6. (Sweden) Anders Järryd (quarterfinalist)
7. (France) Yannick Noah (quarterfinalist)
8. (West Germany) Boris Becker (fourth round)
9. (Czechoslovakia) Miloslav Mečíř (second round)
10. (Sweden) Joakim Nyström (quarterfinalist)
11. (Sweden) Stefan Edberg (fourth round)
12. (United States) Johan Kriek (second round)
13. (United States) Tim Mayotte (fourth round)
14. (Sweden) Henrik Sundström (first round)
15. (United States) Scott Davis (second round)
16. (Czechoslovakia) Tomáš Šmíd (fourth round)

== Draw ==
=== Key ===
- Q = Qualifier
- WC = Wild card
- LL = Lucky loser
- r = Retired

=== Final eight ===
Quarterfinals
1	(United States) John McEnroe	6	6	7
10	(Sweden) Joakim Nyström	1	0	5
3	(Sweden) Mats Wilander	2	6	5
6	(Sweden) Anders Järryd	6	2	0^{r}
(Switzerland) Heinz Günthardt	2	2	4
4	(United States) Jimmy Connors	6	6	6
7	(France) Yannick Noah	2	2	4
2	(Czechoslovakia) Ivan Lendl	6	6	6

Semifinals
1	(United States) John McEnroe	3	6	4	6	6
3	(Sweden) Mats Wilander	6	4	6	3	3
4	(United States) Jimmy Connors	2	3	5
2	(Czechoslovakia) Ivan Lendl	6	6	7

Final
1	(United States) John McEnroe	6^{1}	3	4
2	(Czechoslovakia) Ivan Lendl	7^{7}	6	6

=== Section 1 ===
First round
1	(United States) J McEnroe	6	6	2	6	7
(Israel) S Glickstein	1	7	6	3	6
(Chile) H Gildemeister	4	3	6	6	3
(Canada) M Wostenholme	6	6	3	3	6
WC	(United States) S Denton	7	6	4	3
Q	(United States) R Matuszewski	6	7	6	6
(United States) M Leach	6	4	2
(United States) B Schultz	7	6	6
(Argentina) R Argüello	3	1	1
(United States) J Arias	6	6	6
(Israel) A Mansdorf	7	4	7	6
(United States) J Sadri	6	6	6	1
(Argentina) G Vilas	7	6	6	3	6
(Australia) W Masur	6	7	4	6	1
(United States) M Flur	3	5	2
16	(Czechoslovakia) T Šmid	6	7	6

Second round
1	(United States) J McEnroe	6	7	6
(Canada) M Wostenholme	0	6	1
Q	(United States) R Matuszewski	3	4	6
(United States) B Schultz	6	6	7
(United States) J Arias	6	6	6	6	0
(Israel) A Mansdorf	4	7	7	2	1^{r}
(Argentina) G Vilas	2	2	1
16	(Czechoslovakia) T Šmid	6	6	6

Third round
1	(United States) J McEnroe	6	6	6
(United States) B Schultz	3	4	4
(United States) J Arias	6	6	3	3	6
16	(Czechoslovakia) T Šmid	4	1	6	6	7

Fourth round
1	(United States) J McEnroe	6	7	6
16	(Czechoslovakia) T Šmid	3	5	2

=== Section 2 ===
First round
10	(Sweden) J Nyström	6	7	6
(United States) C Hooper	4	5	1
(Haiti) R Agénor	6	6	4
(United States) B Green	7	7	6
(United States) D Goldie	6	6	3	7
(United States) M Davis	4	3	6	6
(United States) M De Palmer	6	6	3	6	5
(Czechoslovakia) M Vajda	2	2	6	7	7
(United States) J Brown	3	5	6	4
(United States) L Bourne	6	7	2	6
(United States) L Duncan	4	2	2
Q	(New Zealand) K Evernden	6	6	6
(Australia) J Fitzgerald	2	1	6	6	4
(Netherlands) H Van Boeckel	6	6	3	4	6
(Australia) P Doohan	4	1	2
8	(West Germany) B Becker	6	6	6

Second round
10	(Sweden) J Nyström	6	3	6	6
(United States) B Green	3	6	3	0
(United States) D Goldie	1	6	6	6
(Czechoslovakia) M Vajda	6	3	2	2
(United States) L Bourne	4	3	4
Q	(New Zealand) K Evernden	6	6	6
(Netherlands) H Van Boeckel	3	0	2
8	(West Germany) B Becker	6	6	6

Third round
10	(Sweden) J Nyström	6	6	1
(United States) D Goldie	1	1	1^{r}
Q	(New Zealand) K Evernden	6	3	6
8	(West Germany) B Becker	7	6	7

Fourth round
10	(Sweden) J Nyström	6	6	4	6
8	(West Germany) B Becker	3	4	6	4

=== Section 3 ===
First round
3	(Sweden) M Wilander	6	6	6
(India) V Amritraj	2	4	4
Q	(United States) B Foxworth	6	6	4	6	6
(Socialist Federal Republic of Yugoslavia) S Živojinović	7	4	6	3	2
(United States) P Annacone	6	6	3	6
(United States) T Gullikson	4	4	6	1
(Chile) R Acuña	4	2	6
(United States) P Fleming	6	6	7
(Ecuador) R Viver	1	4	2
Q	(South Africa) D Visser	6	6	6
(Socialist Federal Republic of Yugoslavia) M Ostoja	6	6	6	2	7
(Argentina) R Saad	4	4	7	6	6
(Brazil) C Motta	3	6	4	7	6
(United States) G Holmes	6	2	6	6	7
(Australia) P McNamee	4	2	4
12	(United States) J Kriek	6	6	6

Second round
3	(Sweden) M Wilander	6	7	6
Q	(United States) B Foxworth	3	5	3
(United States) P Annacone	2	7	7	6
(United States) P Fleming	6	5	5	1
Q	(South Africa) D Visser	2	2	3
(Socialist Federal Republic of Yugoslavia) M Ostoja	6	6	6
(United States) G Holmes	2	6	6	6
12	(United States) J Kriek	6	4	3	1

Third round
3	(Sweden) M Wilander	6	6	7	6
(United States) P Annacone	3	7	6	1
(Socialist Federal Republic of Yugoslavia) M Ostoja	6	1	2	2
(United States) G Holmes	4	6	6	6

Fourth round
3	(Sweden) M Wilander	7	6	7
(United States) G Holmes	6	1	5

=== Section 4 ===
First round
13	(United States) T Mayotte	6	6	6
(United States) T Moor	4	2	4
(Paraguay) V Pecci Sr.	5	5	5
(United Kingdom) J Lloyd	7	7	7
(Australia) B Drewett	2	4	0
(Nigeria) N Odizor	6	6	6
(United States) J Canter	4	6	6	6
WC	(United States) R Seguso	6	4	3	4
(Czechoslovakia) P Složil	6	6	6
(Paraguay) F González	3	4	4
(United States) V Van Patten	3	3	6	6
(United States) T Wilkison	6	6	4	7
WC	(Romania) I Năstase	3	3	6	6
(United States) M Bauer	6	6	4	7
WC	(Sweden) M Pernfors	3	6	4
6	(Sweden) A Järryd	6	7	6

Second round
13	(United States) T Mayotte	4	6	7	7
(United Kingdom) J Lloyd	6	1	6	5
(Nigeria) N Odizor	7	2	6	7
(United States) J Canter	6	6	4	6
(Czechoslovakia) P Složil	1	3	1
(United States) T Wilkison	6	6	6
(United States) M Bauer	4	3	3
6	(Sweden) A Järryd	6	6	6

Third round
13	(United States) T Mayotte	7	6	6
(Nigeria) N Odizor	5	4	3
(United States) T Wilkison	0	1	4
6	(Sweden) A Järryd	6	6	6

Fourth round
13	(United States) T Mayotte	6	6	4
6	(Sweden) A Järryd	7	7	6

=== Section 5 ===
First round
5	(United States) K Curren	6	1	2
(France) G Forget	7	6	6
(France) H Leconte	6	6	6
(Poland) W Fibak	4	3	4
(Hungary) B Taróczy	7	4	6	5
(West Germany) H Schwaier	6	6	7	7
(Sweden) T Högstedt	4	4	6
Q	(Nigeria) T Mmoh	6	6	7
(Switzerland) H Günthardt	6	6	6
(India) R Krishnan	3	4	2
(Czechoslovakia) L Pimek	3	4	2
(United States) M Purcell	6	6	6
Q	(United States) S Meister	3	3	4
(Uruguay) D Pérez	6	6	6
(Argentina) M Jaite	6	2	6	6
14	(Sweden) H Sundström	4	6	2	3

Second round
(France) G Forget	4	4	4
(France) H Leconte	6	6	6
(West Germany) H Schwaier	5	6	7	7	6
Q	(Nigeria) T Mmoh	7	7	5	6	3
(Switzerland) H Günthardt	5	6	6	6
(United States) M Purcell	7	2	1	2
(Uruguay) D Pérez	3	6	3
(Argentina) M Jaite	6	7	6

Third round
(France) H Leconte	6	6	6
(West Germany) H Schwaier	2	2	1
(Switzerland) H Günthardt	6	3	7	6	6
(Argentina) M Jaite	7	6	6	4	1

Fourth round
(France) H Leconte	6	2	6	6	3
(Switzerland) H Günthardt	7	6	3	4	6

=== Section 6 ===
First round
11	(Sweden) S Edberg	6	6	6
(Argentina) JL Clerc	4	3	3
(United States) K Flach	7	6	2	6
Q	(Mexico) L Lavalle	5	2	6	1
(United States) B Gilbert	6	6	6
Q	(South Africa) C van Rensburg	2	2	2
WC	(United States) L Jensen	2	4	6	6	7
(United States) M Mitchell	6	6	1	4	5
(Czechoslovakia) J Navrátil	7	3	7	3	0
(France) T Tulasne	6	6	6	6	6
(Israel) S Perkiss	4	6	2
Q	(Sweden) P Lundgren	6	7	6
(United States) H Pfister	6	6	6
(United States) S McCain	3	4	4
Q	(South Africa) G Muller	4	3	6	2
4	(United States) J Connors	6	6	4	6

Second round
11	(Sweden) S Edberg	7	6	6
(United States) K Flach	5	3	4
(United States) B Gilbert	6	6	6
WC	(United States) L Jensen	3	2	3
(France) T Tulasne	7	1	7	6
Q	(Sweden) P Lundgren	6	6	5	3
(United States) H Pfister	3	4	2
4	(United States) J Connors	6	6	6

Third round
11	(Sweden) S Edberg	4	6	6	6
(United States) B Gilbert	6	4	1	4
(France) T Tulasne	5	2	4
4	(United States) J Connors	7	6	6

Fourth round
11	(Sweden) S Edberg	4	6	3	4
4	(United States) J Connors	6	3	6	6

=== Section 7 ===
First round
7	(France) Y Noah	6	7	6
(United Kingdom) J Bates	3	6	3
WC	(United States) J Grabb	6	6	7	6
(Brazil) G Barbosa	2	7	5	3
Q	(United States) T Nelson	7	4	7	7
(United States) M Dickson	6	6	6	6
(United States) V Gerulaitis	7	3	7	7
(France) T Benhabiles	6	6	5	5
(United Kingdom) C Dowdeswell	6	6	5	4
(Argentina) E Bengoechea	4	7	7	6
Q	(United States) D Rostagno	4	7	6	5	4
WC	(United States) J Berger	6	6	0	7	6
(Argentina) A Ganzábal	1	4	5
(United States) B Teacher	6	6	7
(Italy) M Cierro	4	0	4
15	(United States) S Davis	6	6	6

Second round
7	(France) Y Noah	7	6	6
WC	(United States) J Grabb	6	3	2
Q	(United States) T Nelson	2	6	2	6
(United States) V Gerulaitis	6	3	6	7
(Argentina) E Bengoechea	1	3	2
WC	(United States) J Berger	6	6	6
(United States) B Teacher	6	7	6
15	(United States) S Davis	3	6	3

Third round
7	(France) Y Noah	6	6	6
(United States) V Gerulaitis	3	4	3
WC	(United States) J Berger	4	7	6	7
(United States) B Teacher	6	6	4	6

Fourth round
7	(France) Y Noah	6	6	6	6
WC	(United States) J Berger	7	2	3	1

=== Section 8 ===
First round
9	(Czechoslovakia) M Mečíř	5	4	7	6	6
Q	(United States) A Kohlberg	7	6	6	3	1
(United States) D Pate	6	6	2	6
(Socialist Federal Republic of Yugoslavia) B Orešar	2	3	6	0
Q	(Peru) J Yzaga	5	7	3	6	6
(Switzerland) J Hlasek	7	5	6	4	3
(United States) D Cassidy	6	6	6	6
Q	(Egypt) A El-Mehelmy	4	7	2	3
Q	(Finland) L Palin	6	3	4	6	4
(Argentina) H de la Peña	3	6	6	4	6
WC	(United States) T Gullikson	6	3	6	4
(Italy) C Panatta	7	6	2	6
(United States) B Testerman	6	6	6	7	3
(United States) B Scanlon	7	7	0	5	6
(United States) J Lapidus	2	1	3
2	(Czechoslovakia) I Lendl	6	6	6

Second round
9	(Czechoslovakia) M Mečíř	4	0	3
(United States) D Pate	6	6	6
Q	(Peru) J Yzaga	6	6	6	6	7
(United States) D Cassidy	7	3	7	1	5
(Argentina) H de la Peña	6	7	7	6
(Italy) C Panatta	7	5	6	3
(United States) B Scanlon	2	0	3
2	(Czechoslovakia) I Lendl	6	6	6

Third round
(United States) D Pate	3	3	6
Q	(Peru) J Yzaga	6	6	7
(Argentina) H de la Peña	1	1	3
2	(Czechoslovakia) I Lendl	6	6	6

Fourth round
Q	(Peru) J Yzaga	6	3	4	0
2	(Czechoslovakia) I Lendl	4	6	6	6

Preceded by 1985 Wimbledon Championships – Men's singles	Grand Slam men's singles	Succeeded by 1985 Australian Open – Men's singles
