= 1987 Wimbledon Championships – Men's doubles qualifying =

Men's doubles qualifying
- 1987 Wimbledon Championships

Events
Singles	men	women		boys	girls
Doubles	men	women	mixed	boys	girls
WC Singles	men	women	quad
WC Doubles	men	women	quad
Legends	men	women	seniors

Qualification
Singles	men	women
Doubles	men	women	mixed
- Wimbledon Championships

Players and pairs who neither have high enough rankings nor receive wild cards may participate in a qualifying tournament held one week before the annual Wimbledon Tennis Championships.

== Qualifiers ==
1. (New Zealand) Russell Simpson / (United States) Larry Stefanki
2. (South Africa) Pieter Aldrich / (South Africa) Warren Green
3. (United States) Bud Cox / (Australia) Michael Fancutt
4. (Israel) Gilad Bloom / (Israel) Amos Mansdorf
5. (India) Anand Amritraj / (Argentina) Javier Frana

== Lucky losers ==
1. (Australia) Russell Barlow / (West Germany) Harald Rittersbacher

== Qualifying draw ==
=== First qualifier ===
First round
(United States) Steve Denton (United States) David Dowlen	6	6
(United Kingdom) Patrick Hughesman (United Kingdom) Chris Kermode	2	1
(United States) Patrick McEnroe (United States) John Sadri	3	6	6
(United States) Tracy Delatte (United States) Leif Shiras	6	4	3
(Australia) Craig A. Miller (United States) Rick Rudeen	3	7	6
(South Africa) Craig Campbell (Australia) Peter Lloyd	6	5	3
(United States) Joey Rive (United States) Craig Wittus	5	6	7
(New Zealand) Russell Simpson (United States) Larry Stefanki	7	4	9

Second round
(United States) Steve Denton (United States) David Dowlen	6^{5}	6^{4}
(United States) Patrick McEnroe (United States) John Sadri	7^{7}	7^{7}
(Australia) Craig A. Miller (United States) Rick Rudeen	6^{4}	3
(New Zealand) Russell Simpson (United States) Larry Stefanki	7^{7}	6

Qualifying competition
(United States) Patrick McEnroe (United States) John Sadri	3	4	6	6^{4}
(New Zealand) Russell Simpson (United States) Larry Stefanki	6	6	4	7^{7}

=== Second qualifier ===
First round
(Australia) David Macpherson (Australia) Simon Youl	4	6	7
(South Africa) Pieter Aldrich (South Africa) Warren Green	6	2	9
(Japan) Hitoshi Shirato (Japan) Toru Yonezawa	1	4
(United States) John Losito (Switzerland) Jarek Srnensky	6	6
(Japan) Tsuyoshi Fukui (Japan) Nobuya Tamura	3	6^{0}
(Australia) Antony Emerson (Australia) Anthony Lane	6	7^{7}
(Switzerland) Claudio Mezzadri (India) Srinivasan Vasudevan	4	2
(United States) Marc Flur (Israel) Shlomo Glickstein	6	6

Second round
(South Africa) Pieter Aldrich (South Africa) Warren Green	7^{7}	6
(United States) John Losito (Switzerland) Jarek Srnensky	6^{3}	3
(Australia) Antony Emerson (Australia) Anthony Lane	4	6	6
(United States) Marc Flur (Israel) Shlomo Glickstein	6	3	2

Qualifying competition
(South Africa) Pieter Aldrich (South Africa) Warren Green	7^{10}	6	7
(Australia) Antony Emerson (Australia) Anthony Lane	6^{8}	3	5

=== Third qualifier ===
First round
(United States) Bud Cox (Australia) Michael Fancutt	6	7^{7}
(New Zealand) Steve Guy (Finland) Olli Rahnasto	4	6^{4}
(West Germany) Stefan Heckmanns (West Germany) Karsten Saniter	6^{4}	6^{2}
(United States) Ed Ross (United States) John Ross	7^{7}	7^{7}
(United States) Karl Richter (Argentina) Roberto Saad	7^{8}	7^{9}
(Australia) Chris Ellis (Australia) Anthony Spartalis	6^{6}	6^{7}
(United Kingdom) David Roberts (United Kingdom) Peter Russell	3	5
(Denmark) Morten Christensen (Republic of Ireland) Peter Wright	6	7

Second round
(United States) Bud Cox (Australia) Michael Fancutt	6^{5}	6	6
(United States) Ed Ross (United States) John Ross	7^{7}	3	4
(United States) Karl Richter (Argentina) Roberto Saad	7	4	6
(Denmark) Morten Christensen (Republic of Ireland) Peter Wright	5	6	8

Qualifying competition
(United States) Bud Cox (Australia) Michael Fancutt	6	6	7^{7}
(Denmark) Morten Christensen (Republic of Ireland) Peter Wright	1	2	6^{1}

=== Fourth qualifier ===
First round
(France) Arnaud Boetsch (Netherlands) Johan Vekemans	6^{2}	7	2
(Australia) Paul Mick (South Africa) Neil Smith	7^{7}	5	6
(United States) Greg Neuhart (United States) Doug Stone	6^{3}	3
(United States) Mike Lee (The Bahamas) Roger Smith	7^{7}	6
(United States) Brett Buffington (Italy) Diego Nargiso	6^{3}	6	4
(United Kingdom) Nick Brown (United Kingdom) David Lloyd	7^{7}	4	6
(South Africa) Denys Maasdorp (West Germany) Alexander Mronz
(Israel) Gilad Bloom (Israel) Amos Mansdorf

Second round
(Australia) Paul Mick (South Africa) Neil Smith	6	6
(United States) Mike Lee (The Bahamas) Roger Smith	4	4
(United Kingdom) Nick Brown (United Kingdom) David Lloyd	3	4
(Israel) Gilad Bloom (Israel) Amos Mansdorf	6	6

Qualifying competition
(Australia) Paul Mick (South Africa) Neil Smith	6^{4}	3	5
(Israel) Gilad Bloom (Israel) Amos Mansdorf	7^{7}	6	7

=== Fifth qualifier ===
First round
(Brazil) Nelson Aerts (Brazil) Fernando Roese	7^{7}	3	8
(Canada) Bill Cowan (Canada) Geoff Roper	6^{5}	6	6
(India) Anand Amritraj (Argentina) Javier Frana	7^{7}	6
(West Germany) Ulf Fischer (South Africa) Frank Punčec	6^{4}	4
(Australia) Pat Serret (Australia) Marcus Smith	3	4
(South Africa) Delayne Howell (United States) Peter Smith	6	6
(Sweden) Niclas Kroon (Uruguay) Daniel Montes de Oca	1	5
(Australia) Russell Barlow (West Germany) Harald Rittersbacher	6	7

Second round
(Brazil) Nelson Aerts (Brazil) Fernando Roese	6^{16}	5
(India) Anand Amritraj (Argentina) Javier Frana	7^{18}	7
(South Africa) Delayne Howell (United States) Peter Smith	4	0
(Australia) Russell Barlow (West Germany) Harald Rittersbacher	6	6

Qualifying competition
(India) Anand Amritraj (Argentina) Javier Frana	7^{7}	7^{8}	6
(Australia) Russell Barlow (West Germany) Harald Rittersbacher	6^{5}	6^{6}	3
