= 1987 Wimbledon Championships – Men's singles qualifying =

Men's singles qualifying
- 1987 Wimbledon Championships

Events
Singles	men	women		boys	girls
Doubles	men	women	mixed	boys	girls
WC Singles	men	women	quad
WC Doubles	men	women	quad
Legends	men	women	seniors

Qualification
Singles	men	women
Doubles	men	women	mixed
- Wimbledon Championships

Players and pairs who neither have high enough rankings nor receive wild cards may participate in a qualifying tournament held one week before the annual Wimbledon Tennis Championships.

== Qualifiers ==
1. (United States) Larry Scott
2. (United States) Richey Reneberg
3. (United States) Larry Stefanki
4. (Australia) Des Tyson
5. (Australia) Mark Woodforde
6. (United States) Marc Flur
7. (Soviet Union) Andrei Olhovskiy
8. (South Africa) Gary Muller
9. (United States) Ken Flach
10. (Australia) Simon Youl
11. (United States) Mike Bauer
12. (Nigeria) Tony Mmoh
13. (West Germany) Christian Saceanu
14. (United States) Leif Shiras
15. (Soviet Union) Alexander Volkov
16. (Argentina) Roberto Saad

== Qualifying draw ==
=== First qualifier ===
First round
(Sweden) Magnus Tideman	3	4
(United States) Larry Scott	6	6
(France) Arnaud Boetsch	6	6
(Mexico) Héctor Ortiz	4	3
(United Kingdom) Nick Brown	6	6
(South Africa) Warren Green	4	4
(Nigeria) Godwin Emeh	1	6
(South Africa) Brian Levine	6	7

Second round
(United States) Larry Scott	6	7	6
(France) Arnaud Boetsch	7	6	2
(United Kingdom) Nick Brown	7	6
(South Africa) Brian Levine	6	3

Qualifying competition
(United States) Larry Scott	2	6	4	6	6
(United Kingdom) Nick Brown	6	2	6	4	0

=== Second qualifier ===
First round
(Australia) Darren Cahill	6	6
(United States) Eric Korita	2	2
(United States) Richey Reneberg	7	6
(Switzerland) Claudio Mezzadri	5	3
(Denmark) Morten Christensen	1	7	2
(West Germany) Harald Rittersbacher	6	6	6
(Italy) Diego Nargiso	1	3
(United States) Cary Stansbury	6	6

Second round
(Australia) Darren Cahill	6	6	5
(United States) Richey Reneberg	7	3	7
(West Germany) Harald Rittersbacher	7	6
(United States) Cary Stansbury	6	2

Qualifying competition
(United States) Richey Reneberg	6	6	6
(West Germany) Harald Rittersbacher	1	2	4

=== Third qualifier ===
First round
(United States) Mark Dickson	6	4	6
(New Zealand) Steve Guy	2	6	4
(Israel) Shlomo Glickstein	7	6	6
(Republic of Ireland) Peter Wright	6	7	3
(South Africa) Craig Campbell	6	6	4
(United States) Val Wilder	7	3	6
(United States) Martin Blackman	6	6
(United States) Larry Stefanki	7	7

Second round
(United States) Mark Dickson	2	6	1
(Israel) Shlomo Glickstein	6	1	6
(United States) Val Wilder	3	4
(United States) Larry Stefanki	6	6

Qualifying competition
(Israel) Shlomo Glickstein	4	1	6	6	6
(United States) Larry Stefanki	6	6	3	4	8

=== Fourth qualifier ===
First round
(United States) Chip Hooper	1	6	3
(Australia) Laurie Warder	6	4	6
(United Kingdom) Howard McGuinness	6	6
(France) Laurent Rizzo	3	4
(United States) Peter Smith	6	6
(United States) Norm Schellenger	3	2
(United Kingdom) David Felgate	4	4
(Australia) Des Tyson	6	6

Second round
(Australia) Laurie Warder	6	6
(United Kingdom) Howard McGuinness	3	4
(United States) Peter Smith	5	2
(Australia) Des Tyson	7	6

Qualifying competition
(Australia) Laurie Warder	3	6	4
(Australia) Des Tyson	6	7	6

=== Fifth qualifier ===
First round
(Australia) Mark Woodforde	7	6
(Mexico) Alfonso González	5	0
(Argentina) Alejandro Gattiker	6	4
(Brazil) Fernando Roese	7	6
(The Bahamas) Roger Smith	6	6
(West Germany) Alexander Mronz	4	1
(Australia) Russell Barlow	7	6
(Canada) Grant Connell	5	4

Second round
(Australia) Mark Woodforde	6	6	10
(Brazil) Fernando Roese	7	3	8
(The Bahamas) Roger Smith	6	6
(Australia) Russell Barlow	1	4

Qualifying competition
(Australia) Mark Woodforde	6	7	7
(The Bahamas) Roger Smith	3	6	5

=== Sixth qualifier ===
First round
(United States) Marc Flur	6	6	15
(United States) Joey Rive	7	3	13
(Japan) Tsuyoshi Fukui	6	6
(Switzerland) Jarek Srnensky	4	4
(United States) Greg Neuhart	2	3
(South Africa) Denys Maasdorp	6	6
(United Kingdom) Leighton Alfred	6	7
(Uruguay) Daniel Montes de Oca	4	6

Second round
(United States) Marc Flur	7	0	6
(Japan) Tsuyoshi Fukui	5	6	1
(South Africa) Denys Maasdorp	6	6	6
(United Kingdom) Leighton Alfred	7	3	1

Qualifying competition
(United States) Marc Flur	6	5	6	6
(South Africa) Denys Maasdorp	4	7	2	4

=== Seventh qualifier ===
First round
(United States) Brad Pearce	6	3
(United Kingdom) Jason Goodall	7	6
(Netherlands) Johan Vekemans	6	6	6
(South Africa) Michael Robertson	3	7	3
(South Africa) Freddie Sauer	0^{r}
(Netherlands) Paul Lobban	1
(Australia) David Macpherson	6	6
(Soviet Union) Andrei Olhovskiy	7	7

Second round
(United Kingdom) Jason Goodall	2	0^{r}
(Netherlands) Johan Vekemans	6	0
(Netherlands) Paul Lobban	3	6
(Soviet Union) Andrei Olhovskiy	6	7

Qualifying competition
(Netherlands) Johan Vekemans	6	6	6	6	6
(Soviet Union) Andrei Olhovskiy	3	4	7	7	8

=== Eighth qualifier ===
First round
(South Africa) Gary Muller	6	6	18
(Brazil) Nelson Aerts	7	4	16
(United States) Kent Kinnear	4	6	3
(West Germany) Christian Geyer	6	3	6
(United States) Robert Van't Hof	6	6
(United Kingdom) Jonathan Southcombe	1	4
(Argentina) Javier Frana	7	4	6
(India) Srinivasan Vasudevan	5	6	4

Second round
(South Africa) Gary Muller	7	6
(West Germany) Christian Geyer	6	4
(United States) Robert Van't Hof	6	6
(Argentina) Javier Frana	1	1

Qualifying competition
(South Africa) Gary Muller	6	6	6	7
(United States) Robert Van't Hof	2	7	2	6

=== Ninth qualifier ===
First round
(United States) Ken Flach	6	6	10
(Australia) Anthony Lane	4	7	8
(United States) Mark Basham	7	6	4
(United States) Andy Kohlberg	5	7	6
(United States) David Dowlen	6	6	6
(United Kingdom) Mike Walker	7	3	4
(Canada) Bill Cowan	6	4	4
(Brazil) Dácio Campos	4	6	6

Second round
(United States) Ken Flach	4	6	8
(United States) Andy Kohlberg	6	3	6
(United States) David Dowlen	4	0
(Brazil) Dácio Campos	6	6

Qualifying competition
(United States) Ken Flach	6	6	6	6
(Brazil) Dácio Campos	7	2	2	4

=== Tenth qualifier ===
First round
(Australia) Simon Youl	6	7
(Australia) Jason Stoltenberg	4	6
(Australia) Todd Woodbridge	6	4	6
(Nigeria) Sadiq Abdullahi	1	6	2
(South Africa) Frank Punčec	6	3	6
(United States) John Letts	3	6	2
(United States) Lloyd Bourne	6	6
(United States) Dan Cassidy	0	2

Second round
(Australia) Simon Youl	6	6
(Australia) Todd Woodbridge	1	4
(South Africa) Frank Punčec	1	3
(United States) Lloyd Bourne	6	6

Qualifying competition
(Australia) Simon Youl	6	6	6	3	6
(United States) Lloyd Bourne	7	4	3	6	2

=== Eleventh qualifier ===
First round
(Australia) Mark Kratzmann	6	6
(New Zealand) Brett Steven	1	3
(Australia) Shane Barr	3	7	6
(United States) Luke Jensen	6	6	4
(Japan) Hitoshi Shirato	7	6
(Finland) Olli Rahnasto	5	2
(West Germany) Patrick Baur	6	6
(United States) Mike Bauer	7	7

Second round
(Australia) Mark Kratzmann	6	6
(Australia) Shane Barr	3	3
(Japan) Hitoshi Shirato	6	4
(United States) Mike Bauer	7	6

Qualifying competition
(Australia) Mark Kratzmann	7	6	4	2
(United States) Mike Bauer	5	7	6	6

=== Twelfth qualifier ===
First round
(Nigeria) Tony Mmoh	7	6	6
(Kenya) Paul Wekesa	6	7	3
(United States) Mike Lee	6	3
(United States) Steve Denton	7	6
(Australia) Neil Borwick	6	6
(Australia) Craig A. Miller	3	2
(Australia) Antony Emerson	4	6
(New Zealand) Russell Simpson	6	7

Second round
(Nigeria) Tony Mmoh	7	7
(United States) Steve Denton	6	6
(Australia) Neil Borwick	1	3
(New Zealand) Russell Simpson	6	6

Qualifying competition
(Nigeria) Tony Mmoh	6	3	7	6
(New Zealand) Russell Simpson	4	6	6	3

=== Thirteenth qualifier ===
First round
(West Germany) Christian Saceanu	6	7
(United States) David Wheaton	2	6
(United States) Doug Stone	7	7
(South Africa) Delayne Howell	6	6
(West Germany) Ulf Fischer	2	2
(South Africa) Pieter Aldrich	6	6
(United Kingdom) Laurence Matthews	6	6	4
(Mexico) Leonardo Lavalle	7	3	6

Second round
(West Germany) Christian Saceanu	6	6
(United States) Doug Stone	3	4
(South Africa) Pieter Aldrich	6	2
(Mexico) Leonardo Lavalle	7	6

Qualifying competition
(West Germany) Christian Saceanu	6	6	6
(Mexico) Leonardo Lavalle	4	1	1

=== Fourteenth qualifier ===
First round
(United States) Leif Shiras	7	6
(Chile) Manuel Rodríguez	6	4
(West Germany) Gerald Marzenell	6	3	2
(United States) Tomm Warneke	3	6	6
(United Kingdom) Benjamin Knapp	3	5
(Puerto Rico) Juan Ríos	6	7
(United States) Rick Rudeen	4	4
(Sweden) Niclas Kroon	6	6

Second round
(United States) Leif Shiras	4	7	6
(United States) Tomm Warneke	6	6	1
(Puerto Rico) Juan Ríos	6	7
(Sweden) Niclas Kroon	3	6

Qualifying competition
(United States) Leif Shiras	6	6	3	6
(Puerto Rico) Juan Ríos	3	4	7	5

=== Fifteenth qualifier ===
First round
(United States) Bud Cox	4	7	6
(United States) Rill Baxter	6	6	3
(Australia) Peter Thrupp	0	7	10
(United Kingdom) Martin Guntrip	6	5	8
(United States) Bobby Banck	6	3
(United States) Brian Teacher	7	6
(Soviet Union) Alexander Volkov	6	7
(Chile) Ricardo Acuña	4	5

Second round
(United States) Bud Cox	6	6
(Australia) Peter Thrupp	4	4
(United States) Brian Teacher	4	6	5
(Soviet Union) Alexander Volkov	6	3	7

Qualifying competition
(United States) Bud Cox	7	4	7	2	3
(Soviet Union) Alexander Volkov	6	6	6	6	6

=== Sixteenth qualifier ===
First round
(Argentina) Roberto Saad	6	7
(United States) Karl Richter	2	6
(United Kingdom) David Ison	6	6	8
(West Germany) Karsten Saniter	1	7	6
(Australia) Peter Lloyd	3	6	11
(Japan) Toru Yonezawa	6	3	9
(United States) Patrick McEnroe	7	4	3
(United States) Rick Leach	5	6	6

Second round
(Argentina) Roberto Saad	6	6
(United Kingdom) David Ison	4	4
(Australia) Peter Lloyd	4	6
(United States) Rick Leach	6	7

Qualifying competition
(Argentina) Roberto Saad	6	6	7
(United States) Rick Leach	3	4	6
