= 1987 Wimbledon Championships – Women's doubles qualifying =

Women's doubles qualifying
- 1987 Wimbledon Championships

Events
Singles	men	women		boys	girls
Doubles	men	women	mixed	boys	girls
WC Singles	men	women	quad
WC Doubles	men	women	quad
Legends	men	women	seniors

Qualification
Singles	men	women
Doubles	men	women	mixed
- Wimbledon Championships

Players and pairs who neither have high enough rankings nor receive wild cards may participate in a qualifying tournament held one week before the annual Wimbledon Tennis Championships.

== Qualifiers ==
1. (United Kingdom) Monique Javer / (United States) Niurka Sodupe
2. (Japan) Kumiko Okamoto / (Japan) Naoko Sato
3. (Netherlands) Manon Bollegraf / (Sweden) Maria Lindström
4. (Soviet Union) Leila Meskhi / (Soviet Union) Natasha Zvereva

== Lucky losers ==
1. (South Africa) Karen Schimper / (Japan) Masako Yanagi

== Qualifying draw ==
=== First qualifier ===
First round
(South Africa) Karen Schimper (Japan) Masako Yanagi
bye
(Japan) Akiko Kijimuta (United States) Susan Sloane	w/o
(Australia) Colleen Carney (Hong Kong) Paulette Moreno
Caplen; Patel	1	4
(United Kingdom) Monique Javer (United States) Niurka Sodupe	6	6
(Republic of Ireland) Lesley O'Halloran (South Africa) Margaret Redfearn	6	6
(United States) Jane Forman (United States) Kris Kinney	4	2

Second round
(South Africa) Karen Schimper (Japan) Masako Yanagi	6	6
(Australia) Colleen Carney (Hong Kong) Paulette Moreno	3	4
(United Kingdom) Monique Javer (United States) Niurka Sodupe	6	7
(Republic of Ireland) Lesley O'Halloran (South Africa) Margaret Redfearn	0	5

Qualifying competition
(South Africa) Karen Schimper (Japan) Masako Yanagi	3	3
(United Kingdom) Monique Javer (United States) Niurka Sodupe	6	6

=== Second qualifier ===
First round
(Japan) Kumiko Okamoto (Japan) Naoko Sato
bye
(United Kingdom) Teresa Catlin (United Kingdom) Sally Godman	0	6	6
(United States) Nicole Arendt (United States) Amy Frazier	6	3	3
(United States) Caryn Copeland (United States) Ronni Reis	7	7
(France) Pascale Etchemendy (France) Sybille Niox-Château	5	5
(Czechoslovakia) Regina Rajchrtová (Czechoslovakia) Radka Zrubáková
bye

Second round
(Japan) Kumiko Okamoto (Japan) Naoko Sato	7^{7}	3	7
(United Kingdom) Teresa Catlin (United Kingdom) Sally Godman	6^{4}	6	5
(United States) Caryn Copeland (United States) Ronni Reis	4	6^{2}
(Czechoslovakia) Regina Rajchrtová (Czechoslovakia) Radka Zrubáková	6	7^{7}

Qualifying competition
(Japan) Kumiko Okamoto (Japan) Naoko Sato	6	6
(Czechoslovakia) Regina Rajchrtová (Czechoslovakia) Radka Zrubáková	4	2

=== Third qualifier ===
First round
(United States) Jenni Goodling (United States) Wendy Wood	6	6
(Japan) Yukie Koizumi (Japan) Emiko Okagawa	3	1
(Sweden) Helena Dahlström (Norway) Amy Jönsson Raaholt	2	3
(United Kingdom) Glynis Coles (United Kingdom) Denise Parnell	6	6
(United Kingdom) Jackie Holden (United Kingdom) Claire Pollard	6	6
Moshazuki (United States) Sheri Norris	3	3
bye
(Netherlands) Manon Bollegraf (Sweden) Maria Lindström

Second round
(United States) Jenni Goodling (United States) Wendy Wood	7^{7}	6
(United Kingdom) Glynis Coles (United Kingdom) Denise Parnell	6^{2}	2
(United Kingdom) Jackie Holden (United Kingdom) Claire Pollard	3	6^{3}
(Netherlands) Manon Bollegraf (Sweden) Maria Lindström	6	7^{7}

Qualifying competition
(United States) Jenni Goodling (United States) Wendy Wood	2	2
(Netherlands) Manon Bollegraf (Sweden) Maria Lindström	6	6

=== Fourth qualifier ===
First round
(United States) Jamie Golder (Brazil) Gisele Miró
bye
(United Kingdom) Lorrayne Gracie (New Zealand) Ruth Seeman
(United States) Lisa Bonder (United States) Beverly Bowes	w/o
(Israel) Ilana Berger (Netherlands) Claire Wegink	0	3
(France) Marie-Christine Calleja (France) Emmanuelle Derly	6	6
bye
(Soviet Union) Leila Meskhi (Soviet Union) Natasha Zvereva

Second round
(United States) Jamie Golder (Brazil) Gisele Miró	6	3	7
(United Kingdom) Lorrayne Gracie (New Zealand) Ruth Seeman	3	6	9
(France) Marie-Christine Calleja (France) Emmanuelle Derly	2	2
(Soviet Union) Leila Meskhi (Soviet Union) Natasha Zvereva	6	6

Qualifying competition
(United Kingdom) Lorrayne Gracie (New Zealand) Ruth Seeman	4	2
(Soviet Union) Leila Meskhi (Soviet Union) Natasha Zvereva	6	6
