= 1987 Wimbledon Championships – Women's singles qualifying =

Women's singles qualifying
- 1987 Wimbledon Championships

Events
Singles	men	women		boys	girls
Doubles	men	women	mixed	boys	girls
WC Singles	men	women	quad
WC Doubles	men	women	quad
Legends	men	women	seniors

Qualification
Singles	men	women
Doubles	men	women	mixed
- Wimbledon Championships

Players and pairs who neither have high enough rankings nor receive wild cards may participate in a qualifying tournament held one week before the annual Wimbledon Tennis Championships.

== Qualifiers ==
1. (Poland) Iwona Kuczyńska
2. (Soviet Union) Natalia Medvedeva
3. (Italy) Laura Golarsa
4. (Brazil) Gisele Miró
5. (Australia) Michelle Jaggard
6. (South Africa) Karen Schimper
7. (New Zealand) Belinda Cordwell
8. (Japan) Kumiko Okamoto

== Lucky loser ==
1. (United States) Anna-Maria Fernandez

== Qualifying draw ==
=== First qualifier ===
First round
(Japan) Emiko Okagawa	4	4
(United States) Louise Allen	6	6
(Czechoslovakia) Olga Votavová	1	2
(United States) Niurka Sodupe	6	6
(Poland) Iwona Kuczyńska	7^{7}	6
(Argentina) Gabriela Mosca	6^{4}	2
(United States) Amy Frazier	6^{5}	6	7
(United States) Kris Kinney	7^{7}	2	5

Second round
(United States) Louise Allen	6	6
(United States) Niurka Sodupe	2	2
(Poland) Iwona Kuczyńska	6	6
(United States) Amy Frazier	4	0

Qualifying competition
(United States) Louise Allen	5	3
(Poland) Iwona Kuczyńska	7	6

=== Second qualifier ===
First round
(Brazil) Cláudia Monteiro	6	7^{8}
(United States) Paula Smith	4	6^{6}
(New Zealand) Julie Richardson	2	6	2
(Soviet Union) Natalia Medvedeva	6	4	6
(Sweden) Elisabeth Ekblom	7	6
(United States) Jane Forman	5	3
(Belgium) Sandra Wasserman	3	2
(Netherlands) Manon Bollegraf	6	6

Second round
(Brazil) Cláudia Monteiro	3	6^{4}
(Soviet Union) Natalia Medvedeva	6	7^{7}
(Sweden) Elisabeth Ekblom	1	4
(Netherlands) Manon Bollegraf	6	6

Qualifying competition
(Soviet Union) Natalia Medvedeva	6	6
(Netherlands) Manon Bollegraf	4	3

=== Third qualifier ===
First round
(United States) Anna-Maria Fernandez	6	6
(United States) Caryn Copeland	1	3
(Italy) Sabina Simmonds	6	6
(United Kingdom) Lisa Pennington	0	3
(Switzerland) Céline Cohen	1	5
(Soviet Union) Leila Meskhi	6	7
(France) Pascale Etchemendy	2	3
(Italy) Laura Golarsa	6	6

Second round
(United States) Anna-Maria Fernandez	6	5	6
(Italy) Sabina Simmonds	3	7	3
(Soviet Union) Leila Meskhi	4	1
(Italy) Laura Golarsa	6	6

Qualifying competition
(United States) Anna-Maria Fernandez	0	2
(Italy) Laura Golarsa	6	6

=== Fourth qualifier ===
First round
(Brazil) Gisele Miró	6	6
(Netherlands) Marianne van der Torre	4	1
(France) Sybille Niox-Château	3	4
(United States) Melissa Brown	6	6
(Sweden) Monica Lundqvist	6	4	6
(United States) Nicole Arendt	2	6	3
(United Kingdom) Karen Hunter	6	0	3
(West Germany) Christina Singer	4	6	6

Second round
(Brazil) Gisele Miró	6	6
(United States) Melissa Brown	2	3
(Sweden) Monica Lundqvist	6	0	3
(West Germany) Christina Singer	3	6	6

Qualifying competition
(Brazil) Gisele Miró	6	7
(West Germany) Christina Singer	4	5

=== Fifth qualifier ===
First round
(Australia) Susan Leo	3	3
(United States) Deeann Hansel	6	6
(United States) Susan Mascarin	2	3
(Australia) Michelle Jaggard	6	6
(United Kingdom) Glynis Coles	3	2
(United States) Candy Reynolds	6	6
(United States) Sheri Norris	1	3
(United States) Penny Barg	6	6

Second round
(United States) Deeann Hansel	6^{2}	6	4
(Australia) Michelle Jaggard	7^{7}	2	6
(United States) Candy Reynolds	4	6	4
(United States) Penny Barg	6	2	6

Qualifying competition
(Australia) Michelle Jaggard	6^{3}	7^{9}	10
(United States) Penny Barg	7^{7}	6^{7}	8

=== Sixth qualifier ===
First round
(France) Emmanuelle Derly	3	3
(United States) Sandy Collins	6	6
(United Kingdom) Caroline Billingham	3	1
(West Germany) Andrea Betzner	6	6
(Australia) Lisa O'Neill	6	5	6
(United Kingdom) Sally Godman	1	7	1
(United Kingdom) Sally Reeves	6	1	4
(South Africa) Karen Schimper	1	6	6

Second round
(United States) Sandy Collins	3	6	6
(West Germany) Andrea Betzner	6	2	2
(Australia) Lisa O'Neill	1	3
(South Africa) Karen Schimper	6	6

Qualifying competition
(United States) Sandy Collins	6	4	3
(South Africa) Karen Schimper	3	6	6

=== Seventh qualifier ===
First round
(Sweden) Maria Lindström	4	2
(New Zealand) Belinda Cordwell	6	6
(United Kingdom) Jenny Reeves	1	6	4
(Norway) Amy Jönsson Raaholt	6	3	6
(Netherlands) Hellas ter Riet	1	4
(Japan) Masako Yanagi	6	6
(Sweden) Helena Dahlström	7	4	6
(Czechoslovakia) Radka Zrubáková	5	6	3

Second round
(New Zealand) Belinda Cordwell	6	6
(Norway) Amy Jönsson Raaholt	1	0
(Japan) Masako Yanagi	6	6
(Sweden) Helena Dahlström	4	2

Qualifying competition
(New Zealand) Belinda Cordwell	1	6	6
(Japan) Masako Yanagi	6	3	2

=== Eighth qualifier ===
First round
(United Kingdom) Monique Javer	3	2
(United States) Lea Antonoplis	6	6
(United States) Kim Steinmetz	6	6
(Czechoslovakia) Regina Rajchrtová	1	2
(Japan) Yukie Koizumi	6	6
(United Kingdom) Katie Rickett	1	3
(United States) Jamie Golder	2	1
(Japan) Kumiko Okamoto	6	6

Second round
(United States) Lea Antonoplis	6	6
(United States) Kim Steinmetz	4	3
(Japan) Yukie Koizumi	0	0
(Japan) Kumiko Okamoto	6	6

Qualifying competition
(United States) Lea Antonoplis	4	6^{3}
(Japan) Kumiko Okamoto	6	7^{7}
