= Ulf Fischer =

German tennis player

- Full name: Ulf Jens Wladimir Fischer
- Country (sports): West Germany
- Born: 29 July 1965 (age 61) Göttingen, West Germany
- Plays: Right-handed

Singles
- Highest ranking: No. 357 (14 Mar 1983)

Grand Slam singles results
- Wimbledon: Q1 (1987)

Doubles
- Career record: 1–6
- Highest ranking: No. 190 (25 Apr 1983)

Grand Slam doubles results
- Wimbledon: Q1 (1987)

Ulf Fischer (born 29 July 1965) is a German tennis coach and former professional player.

Active on tour in the 1980s, Fischer was born in Göttingen and had a best career singles world ranking of 357. He featured in the qualifying draw for the 1987 Wimbledon Championships. His best performance on the Grand Prix tennis circuit was a doubles semi-final appearance at the 1982 Bavarian Tennis Championships and he made two doubles finals on the second tier ATP Challenger Series. He had a best doubles ranking of 190 in the world.

Fischer has been a tennis coach since 1992 and served as an assistant coach for the Germany Davis Cup team from 2007 to 2011, under Patrik Kühnen. During the 1990s he coached both Hendrik Dreekmann and Alex Rădulescu to grand slam quarter-finals. More recently he was coach of Benjamin Becker, Tommy Haas and Florian Mayer. He was named "Trainer of the Year" by the German Tennis Federation in 2014.

== ATP Challenger finals ==
=== Doubles: 2 (0–2) ===
Result	No.	Date	Tournament	Surface	Partner	Opponents	Score
Loss	1.	Jul 1984	Neunkirchen, West Germany	Clay	(West Germany) Eric Jelen	(West Germany) Hans-Dieter Beutel (West Germany) Christoph Zipf	6–7, 5–7
Loss	2.	Apr 1985	Marrakesh, Morocco	Clay	(Socialist Federal Republic of Yugoslavia) Goran Prpić	(Spain) Sergio Casal (Spain) Emilio Sánchez	6–4, 3–6, 1–6
