= Eugenio Rossi =

Eugenio Rossi may refer to:

- Eugenio Rossi (athlete) (born 1992), Sammarinese athlete
- Eugenio Rossi (tennis) (born 1969), Italian tennis player
