= Peter Lloyd (tennis) =

Australian tennis player

- Country (sports): Australia

Singles
- Highest ranking: No. 339 (6 July 1987)

Grand Slam singles results
- Wimbledon: Q2 (1987)

Doubles
- Career record: 0–1
- Highest ranking: No. 475 (8 June 1987)

Grand Slam doubles results
- Wimbledon: Q1 (1987)

Peter Lloyd is an Australian former professional tennis player.

Lloyd grew up in Canberra and was one of two players from the ACT, along with Steve Maloney, to take up a scholarship in 1978 to attend the University of Georgia. He played collegiate tennis at Georgia for four years and was an All-SEC selection in 1980.

On the professional tour, Lloyd had a best singles world ranking of 339 and featured in the qualifying draw for the 1987 Wimbledon Championships. In 1995 he made his only career ATP Tour main draw appearance as a doubles wildcard pairing with Dan Granot at the AT&T Challenge in Atlanta.
