= Warren Green (tennis) =

South African tennis player (born 1962)

- Full name: Warren Bradley Green
- Country (sports): South Africa
- Born: 31 October 1962 (age 63)
- Prize money: $19,258

Singles
- Career record: 0–2
- Highest ranking: No. 373 (28 December 1987)

Grand Slam singles results
- Wimbledon: Q1 (1987, 1988)

Doubles
- Career record: 3–5
- Highest ranking: No. 147 (11 January 1988)

Grand Slam doubles results
- Wimbledon: 3R (1987)
- US Open: 1R (1987)

Grand Slam mixed doubles results
- Wimbledon: 1R (1988)

Warren Bradley Green (born 31 October 1962) is a former professional tennis player from South Africa.

== Biography ==
Originally from Durban, Green competed on the professional tennis circuit in the 1980s. His uncle, through second wife Marjorie, was England and Fulham footballer Johnny Haynes, who helped Green get set up with accommodation when he moved to London to begin his tennis career.

During his career he twice featured in the singles qualifying draw at Wimbledon and as a doubles player reached the third round of the 1987 Wimbledon Championships, with Pieter Aldrich.

Green, who later immigrated to Australia, married British tennis player Lisa Gould. Their son Chris was born while the couple lived in Durban and he now plays cricket for New South Wales.

== Challenger titles ==
=== Doubles: (1) ===
No.	Year	Tournament	Surface	Partner	Opponents	Score
1.	1987	Dublin, Ireland	Clay	(South Africa) Pieter Aldrich	(United Kingdom) Jason Goodall (United States) Peter Wright	6–7, 6–4, 6–4
