= Karsten Saniter =

German tennis player and coach

- Country (sports): West Germany
- Born: 13 September 1965 (age 59); Köln, West Germany
- Plays: Right-handed

Singles
- Highest ranking: No. 534 (28 Jul 1986)

Grand Slam singles results
- Australian Open: Q1 (1987)
- Wimbledon: Q1 (1987)

Doubles
- Career record: 1–1 (ATP Tour)
- Highest ranking: No. 242 (3 Aug 1987)

Grand Slam doubles results
- Wimbledon: Q1 (1987)

Karsten Saniter (born 13 September 1965) is a German tennis coach and former professional player. He has coached several players including Michael Kohlmann, Michaëlla Krajicek, Björn Phau and Barbara Rittner.

Saniter competed as a professional player in the late 1980s and featured in the qualifying draw at Wimbledon, with a career high singles world ranking of 534. As a doubles player he had a main draw appearance at the Dutch Open and won one ATP Challenger tournament.

A native of Köln, Saniter he played his Bundesliga tennis for RTHC Bayer Leverkusen.

== ATP Challenger titles ==
=== Doubles: (1) ===
No.	Date	Tournament	Surface	Partner	Opponents	Score
1.	Jul 1987	Travemünde Challenger; Travemünde, West Germany	Clay	(West Germany) Alexander Mronz	(Sweden) Niclas Kroon (Sweden) Mats Oleen	6–7, 7–6, 6–4
