= Peter Thrupp =

Australian tennis player

- Country (sports): Australia
- Born: 23 December 1963 (age 61); Brisbane, Australia
- Height: 183 cm (6 ft 0 in)

Singles
- Career record: 0–1
- Highest ranking: No. 316 (29 Sep 1986)

Grand Slam singles results
- Australian Open: 2R (1985)
- Wimbledon: Q2 (1987)

Doubles
- Highest ranking: No. 418 (8 Dec 1986)

Peter Thrupp (born 23 December 1963) is an Australian former professional tennis player.

Thrupp turned professional in 1985 and reached a best singles world ranking of 316 during his career. He featured in the main draw of the 1985 Australian Open, where after a first round bye he was eliminated by American Jay Lapidus.
