= Godwin Emeh =

Nigerian tennis player

- Country (sports): Nigeria
- Plays: Right-handed

Singles
- Highest ranking: No. 407 (Feb 23, 1987)

Grand Slam singles results
- Wimbledon: Q1 (1987)

Doubles
- Career record: 0–1
- Highest ranking: No. 482 (Feb 1, 1984)
Medal record
All-Africa Games
| Silver medal – second place | 1987 Nairobi | Men's doubles |

Godwin Emeh is a Nigerian former professional tennis player.

Emeh, a native of Lagos, didn't take up tennis until the age of 13. He attended Hampton Institute (now Hampton University) in Virginia on a scholarship and earned All-American honors while competing in the NCAA Division II.

On the professional tour, Emeh was a top 500 player in both singles and doubles. He featured in the qualifying draw at the Wimbledon Championships and made the quarter-finals of a Lagos Challenger in 1987.
