= Daniel Montes de Oca (tennis) =

Former Uruguayan tennis player

- Country (sports): Uruguay
- Born: 26 April 1962 (age 64) Colonia, Uruguay
- Height: 5 ft 7 in (170 cm)
- Prize money: $17,633

Singles
- Career record: 0–4 (ATP Tour)
- Highest ranking: No. 201 (28 March 1988)

Grand Slam singles results
- Wimbledon: Q1 (1987)
- US Open: Q3 (1990)

Doubles
- Career record: 0–3 (ATP Tour)
- Highest ranking: No. 287 (15 February 1988)

Grand Slam doubles results
- Wimbledon: Q1 (1987)

Daniel Montes de Oca (born 26 April 1962) is a Uruguayan former professional tennis player.

Born in Colonia, Montes de Oca first appeared on the professional tour in the 1980s when he competed in Grand Prix events, reaching his career high singles ranking of 201 in 1988.

Montes de Oca played a Davis Cup doubles rubber for Uruguay in 1990, against Peru in Montevideo.

In 2002, at the age of 40, he featured in an ATP Tour doubles main draw at the TD Waterhouse Cup in Long Island.

== Challenger/Futures titles ==
Legend
ATP Challenger (1)
ITF Futures (1)

=== Doubles ===
No.	Date	Tournament	Tier	Surface	Partner	Opponents	Score
1.	Nov 1987	São Paulo-3; São Paulo, Brazil	Challenger	Clay	(Uruguay) Marcelo Filippini	(Argentina) Javier Frana (Argentina) Gustavo Guerrero	7–5, 4–6, 6–1
2.	Oct 2001	Jamaica F1, Negril, Jamaica	Futures	Hard	(Peru) Juan-Carlos Parker	(Egypt) Hisham Hemeda (Egypt) Karim Maamoun	6–1, 3–6, 6–3
