= 1987 Wimbledon Championships – Girls' doubles =

Girls' doubles
- 1987 Wimbledon Championships

Final
- Champions: (Soviet Union) Natalia Medvedeva (Soviet Union) Natasha Zvereva
- Runners-up: (South Korea) Kim Il-soon (Hong Kong) Paulette Moreno
- Score: 6–2, 5–7, 6–0

Events
Singles	men	women		boys	girls
Doubles	men	women	mixed	boys	girls
WC Singles	men	women	quad
WC Doubles	men	women	quad
Legends	men	women	seniors
← 1986 ·	Wimbledon Championships	· 1988 →

Natalia Medvedeva and Natasha Zvereva defeated Kim Il-soon and Paulette Moreno in the final, 6–2, 5–7, 6–0 to win the girls' doubles tennis title at the 1987 Wimbledon Championships.

== Seeds ==
1. (Indonesia) Yayuk Basuki / (Indonesia) Waya Walalangi (first round)
2. (Czechoslovakia) Jana Pospíšilová / (Czechoslovakia) Radka Zrubáková (semifinals)
3. (Sweden) Jonna Jonerup / (Sweden) Maria Strandlund (second round)
4. (Soviet Union) Natalia Medvedeva / (Soviet Union) Natasha Zvereva (champions)

== Draw ==
=== Key ===
- Q = Qualifier
- WC = Wild card
- LL = Lucky loser
- Alt = Alternate
- SE = Special exempt
- PR = Protected ranking
- ITF = ITF entry
- JE = Junior exempt
- w/o = Walkover
- r = Retired
- d = Defaulted
- SR = Special ranking

=== Draw ===
First round
1	(Indonesia) Yayuk Basuki (Indonesia) Waya Walalangi	1	6^{5}
(South Korea) Kim Il-soon (Hong Kong) Paulette Moreno	6	7^{7}
(Argentina) Florencia Labat (Argentina) Cristina Tessi	6^{3}	6	6
(South Africa) Rikki Gaddie (South Africa) Nelia Kruger	7^{7}	4	4
3	(Sweden) Jonna Jonerup (Sweden) Maria Strandlund	6	6
(West Germany) Steffi Menning (West Germany) Tanja Weigl	2	0
(Brazil) Luciana Tella (Brazil) Andrea Vieira	2	2
(United States) Nicole Arendt (United States) Trisha Laux	6	6
(United Kingdom) Teresa Catlin (United Kingdom) Sarah Loosemore	6	3	3
(United States) Andrea Berger (United States) Amy Frazier	2	6	6
(Austria) Bettina Diesner (Austria) Barbara Paulus	1	5
4	(Soviet Union) Natalia Medvedeva (Soviet Union) Natasha Zvereva	6	7
(Japan) Yoriko Yamagishi (Japan) Ryoko Yamaguchi	6^{4}	1
(West Germany) Maren Kemper (West Germany) Eva-Maria Schürhoff	7^{7}	6
(Poland) Magdalena Mróz (Poland) Katarzyna Nowak	4	4
2	(Czechoslovakia) Jana Pospíšilová (Czechoslovakia) Radka Zrubáková	6	6

Quarterfinals
(South Korea) Kim Il-soon (Hong Kong) Paulette Moreno	1	5
(Argentina) Florencia Labat (Argentina) Cristina Tessi	6	7
3	(Sweden) Jonna Jonerup (Sweden) Maria Strandlund	4	2
(United States) Nicole Arendt (United States) Trisha Laux	6	6
(United States) Andrea Berger (United States) Amy Frazier	4	2
4	(Soviet Union) Natalia Medvedeva (Soviet Union) Natasha Zvereva	6	6
(West Germany) Maren Kemper (West Germany) Eva-Maria Schürhoff	4	1
2	(Czechoslovakia) Jana Pospíšilová (Czechoslovakia) Radka Zrubáková	6	6

Semifinals
(South Korea) Kim Il-soon (Hong Kong) Paulette Moreno	6	6
(United States) Nicole Arendt (United States) Trisha Laux	4	1
4	(Soviet Union) Natalia Medvedeva (Soviet Union) Natasha Zvereva	4	7	6
2	(Czechoslovakia) Jana Pospíšilová (Czechoslovakia) Radka Zrubáková	6	5	2

Final
(South Korea) Kim Il-soon (Hong Kong) Paulette Moreno	2	7	0
4	(Soviet Union) Natalia Medvedeva (Soviet Union) Natasha Zvereva	6	5	6
