= Denys Maasdorp =

South African tennis player

- Full name: Denys Maasdorp
- Country (sports): South Africa
- Born: 17 June 1963 (age 63) Grahamstown, South Africa
- Height: 183 cm (6 ft 0 in)
- Plays: Right-handed
- Prize money: $28,846

Singles
- Career record: 1–4
- Career titles: 0
- Highest ranking: No. 180 (29 September 1986)

Doubles
- Career record: 0–4
- Career titles: 0
- Highest ranking: No. 129 (20 October 1986)

Grand Slam mixed doubles results
- Wimbledon: 1R (1987)

Denys Maasdorp (born 17 June 1963) is a former professional tennis player from South Africa.

== Biography ==
Maasdorp, a right-handed player from Grahamstown, played on the professional tour in the 1980s. Peaking at 180 in the world in singles, his best performance on the Grand Prix tour was a second round appearance at the 1987 Geneva Open. At the 1987 Wimbledon Championships he competed in the main draw of the mixed doubles, partnering Tina Mochizuki. He won a Challenger doubles tournament in the Austrian city of Graz in 1988.

After leaving the tour he continued to play league tennis in Germany for many years. He now coaches in the United States.

== Challenger titles ==
=== Doubles: (1) ===
No.	Year	Tournament	Surface	Partner	Opponents	Score
1.	1988	Graz, Austria	Hard	(West Germany) Torben Theine	(Czechoslovakia) Stanislav Birner (Italy) Alessandro de Minicis	6–4, 6–4
