= Sheri Norris =

American tennis player

- Country (sports): United States
- Born: February 2, 1964 (age 61)
- Plays: Right-handed
- Prize money: $25,191

Singles
- Career record: 49–68
- Highest ranking: No. 220 (February 2, 1987)

Grand Slam singles results
- Australian Open: 1R (1988)
- French Open: Q2 (1987)
- Wimbledon: Q1 (1987, 1989)

Doubles
- Career record: 12–39
- Highest ranking: No. 302 (February 2, 1987)

Grand Slam doubles results
- Australian Open: 1R (1988)

Grand Slam mixed doubles results
- Wimbledon: 1R (1987)

Sheri Norris (born February 2, 1964) is an American former professional tennis player.

A right-handed player from Topeka, Kansas, Norris was a three-time All-American at Arizona State and an NCAA semi-finalist as a senior in 1986.

Following her graduation, Norris spent the remainder of the 1980s competing on the professional tour. Most notably, she qualified for the singles main draw of the 1988 Australian Open and also played mixed doubles at Wimbledon.

Norris now lives in Austin, Texas.

== ITF finals ==
=== Singles: 2 (0–2) ===
| Outcome | No. | Date | Tournament | Surface | Opponent | Score |
|---|---|---|---|---|---|---|
| Runner-up | 1. | July 13, 1986 | Boynton Beach, United States | Hard | (South Africa) Karen Schimper | 0–6, 3–6 |
| Runner-up | 2. | October 26, 1986 | Honolulu, United States | Hard | (United States) Kathrin Keil | 4–6, 6–3, 5–7 |
