= 1987 Wimbledon Championships – Girls' singles =

Girls' singles
- 1987 Wimbledon Championships

Final
- Champion: (Soviet Union) Natasha Zvereva
- Runner-up: (France) Julie Halard
- Score: 6–4, 6–4

Events
Singles	men	women		boys	girls
Doubles	men	women	mixed	boys	girls
WC Singles	men	women	quad
WC Doubles	men	women	quad
Legends	men	women	seniors
← 1986 ·	Wimbledon Championships	· 1988 →

Natasha Zvereva successfully defended her title, defeating Julie Halard in the final, 6–4, 6–4 to win the girls' singles tennis title at the 1987 Wimbledon Championships.

== Seeds ==
1. (Soviet Union) Natasha Zvereva (champion)
2. (Spain) Arantxa Sánchez Vicario (second round)
3. (Australia) Nicole Provis (quarterfinals)
4. (Austria) Barbara Paulus (semifinals)
5. (United States) Halle Cioffi (third round)
6. (West Germany) Wiltrud Probst (third round)
7. (Czechoslovakia) Radka Zrubáková (second round)
8. (France) Emmanuelle Derly (semifinals)
9. (Australia) Michelle Jaggard (third round)
10. (United States) Nicole Arendt (first round)
11. (United States) Amy Frazier (third round)
12. (Argentina) Gabriela Mosca (quarterfinals)
13. (Netherlands) Brenda Schultz (quarterfinals)
14. (South Korea) Kim Il-soon (third round)
15. (Soviet Union) Natalia Medvedeva (second round)
16. (Hong Kong) Paulette Moreno (second round)

Click on the seed number of a player to go to their draw section.

== Draw ==
=== Key ===
- Q = Qualifier
- WC = Wild card
- LL = Lucky loser
- Alt = Alternate
- SE = Special exempt
- PR = Protected ranking
- ITF = ITF entry
- JE = Junior exempt
- w/o = Walkover
- r = Retired
- d = Defaulted
- SR = Special ranking

=== Finals ===
Quarterfinals
1	(Soviet Union) Natasha Zvereva	6	7^{7}
(Indonesia) Yayuk Basuki	4	6^{3}
3	(Australia) Nicole Provis	2	2
8	(France) Emmanuelle Derly	6	6
12	(Argentina) Gabriela Mosca	2	1
4	(Austria) Barbara Paulus	6	6
(France) Julie Halard	5	6	6
13	(Netherlands) Brenda Schultz	7	2	2

Semifinals
1	(Soviet Union) Natasha Zvereva	6	6
8	(France) Emmanuelle Derly	2	3
4	(Austria) Barbara Paulus	2	6	3
(France) Julie Halard	6	3	6

Final
1	(Soviet Union) Natasha Zvereva	6	6
(France) Julie Halard	4	4

=== Top half ===
==== Section 1 ====
First round
1	(Soviet Union) Natasha Zvereva	6	6
(Argentina) Florencia Labat	3	1
(Colombia) Monica Lara	3	1
(Sweden) Maria Strandlund	6	6
(Canada) Maureen Drake	6	7
(New Zealand) Claudine Toleafoa	3	6
(Austria) Bettina Diesner	2	3
14	(South Korea) Kim Il-soon	6	6
10	(United States) Nicole Arendt	6	6	2
(Indonesia) Yayuk Basuki	7	3	6
(West Germany) Tanja Weigl	3	1
(Finland) Nanne Dahlman	6	6
(Japan) Ryoko Yamaguchi	6	6
(Guatemala) Claudia Mansilla	0	1
(Philippines) Jennifer Saberon	0	2
7	(Czechoslovakia) Radka Zrubáková	6	6

Second round
1	(Soviet Union) N Zvereva	6	6
(Sweden) M Strandlund	2	0
(Canada) M Drake	2	4
14	(South Korea) I-s Kim	6	6
(Indonesia) Y Basuki	6	6
(Finland) N Dahlman	0	4
(Japan) R Yamaguchi	6	5	6
7	(Czechoslovakia) R Zrubáková	4	7	4

Third round
1	(Soviet Union) N Zvereva	6	6
14	(South Korea) I-s Kim	2	0
(Indonesia) Y Basuki	6	2	6
(Japan) R Yamaguchi	2	6	1

Quarterfinals
1	(Soviet Union) N Zvereva	6	7^{7}
(Indonesia) Y Basuki	4	6^{3}

==== Section 2 ====
First round
3	(Australia) Nicole Provis	6	6
(Switzerland) Sandrine Jaquet	3	3
(West Germany) Steffi Menning	2	0
(Spain) María José Llorca	6	6
(Malta) Alexia Gera	2	4
(South Africa) Amanda Coetzer	6	6
(United Kingdom) Alison Hill	1	1
11	(United States) Amy Frazier	6	6
9	(Australia) Michelle Jaggard	7	6
(Austria) Heidi Sprung	5	2
(Venezuela) Nathalie Acacio	0	3
(United Kingdom) Teresa Catlin	6	6
(Peru) Lorena Rodríguez di Laura	3	2
(Sweden) Jonna Jonerup	6	6
(South Africa) Rikki Gaddie	4	6	5
8	(France) Emmanuelle Derly	6	1	7

Second round
3	(Australia) N Provis	6	6
(Spain) MJ Llorca	2	1
(South Africa) A Coetzer	3	1
11	(United States) A Frazier	6	6
9	(Australia) M Jaggard	6	6
(United Kingdom) T Catlin	0	3
(Sweden) J Jonerup	6	4	2
8	(France) E Derly	4	6	6

Third round
3	(Australia) N Provis	6	6
11	(United States) A Frazier	3	1
9	(Australia) M Jaggard	1	6	2
8	(France) E Derly	6	2	6

Quarterfinals
3	(Australia) N Provis	2	2
8	(France) E Derly	6	6

=== Bottom half ===
==== Section 3 ====
First round
5	(United States) Halle Cioffi	6	6
(Guatemala) Mónica Agüero	0	0
(United Kingdom) Sally Timms	5	2
(West Germany) Maren Kemper	7	6
(Indonesia) Waya Walalangi	1	2
(Bulgaria) Elena Pampoulova	6	6
(South Africa) Nelia Kruger	3	7	1
12	(Argentina) Gabriela Mosca	6	6	6
16	(Hong Kong) Paulette Moreno	6	6
(Poland) Magdalena Mróz	3	4
(Brazil) Luciana Tella	5	6	3
(Argentina) Cristina Tessi	7	2	6
(Switzerland) Emanuela Zardo	6	6
(Republic of Ireland) Jennifer O'Brien	1	0
(United Kingdom) Sally Godman	3	6	3
4	(Austria) Barbara Paulus	6	3	6

Second round
5	(United States) H Cioffi	6	6
(West Germany) M Kemper	2	2
(Bulgaria) E Pampoulova	1	1
12	(Argentina) G Mosca	6	6
16	(Hong Kong) P Moreno	1	6	5
(Argentina) C Tessi	6	3	7
(Switzerland) E Zardo	3	2
4	(Austria) B Paulus	6	6

Third round
5	(United States) H Cioffi	6^{6}	6	4
12	(Argentina) G Mosca	7^{8}	4	6
(Argentina) C Tessi	3	6	4
4	(Austria) B Paulus	6	3	6

Quarterfinals
12	(Argentina) G Mosca	2	1
4	(Austria) B Paulus	6	6

==== Section 4 ====
First round
6	(West Germany) Wiltrud Probst	7	7
(Spain) Conchita Martínez	5	5
(Japan) Yoriko Yamagishi	2	3
(West Germany) Eva-Maria Schürhoff	6	6
(United Kingdom) Sarah Loosemore	6	5
(France) Julie Halard	7	7
(United States) Trisha Laux	6	4
15	(Soviet Union) Natalia Medvedeva	7	6
13	(Netherlands) Brenda Schultz	6	6
(Brazil) Andrea Vieira	1	3
(Poland) Katarzyna Nowak	4	0
(Switzerland) Michèle Strebel	6	6
(Czechoslovakia) Jana Pospíšilová	6	6
(United States) Andrea Berger	1	1
(Philippines) Sarah Rafael	1	1
2	(Spain) Arantxa Sánchez Vicario	6	6

Second round
6	(West Germany) W Probst	6	6
(West Germany) E-M Schürhoff	3	2
(France) J Halard	6	7
15	(Soviet Union) N Medvedeva	4	5
13	(Netherlands) B Schultz	6	6
(Switzerland) M Strebel	2	4
(Czechoslovakia) J Pospíšilová	6	6
2	(Spain) A Sánchez Vicario	3	3

Third round
6	(West Germany) W Probst	4	3
(France) J Halard	6	6
13	(Netherlands) B Schultz	6	6
(Czechoslovakia) J Pospíšilová	4	2

Quarterfinals
(France) J Halard	5	6	6
13	(Netherlands) B Schultz	7	2	2
