= Jarek Srnensky =

Swiss tennis player

- Country (sports): Switzerland
- Born: 16 January 1963 (age 63) Vsetín, Czechoslovakia

Singles
- Highest ranking: No. 348 (29 April 1985)

Doubles
- Career record: 0–5
- Highest ranking: No. 192 (8 December 1986)

Grand Slam doubles results
- French Open: 1R (1985, 1986)

Jarek Srnensky (Czech: Srněnský; born 16 January 1963) is a Swiss former professional tennis player.

Srnensky was born in Czechoslovakia, but grew up in the Swiss town of Chur.

While competing on the professional tour he twice featured in the French Open main draw as a doubles player, in 1985 and 1986, both times partnering João Soares.

== Challenger titles ==
=== Doubles: (1) ===
Year	Tournament	Surface	Partner	Opponents	Score
1986	Ogun, Nigeria	Hard	(Nigeria) Tony Mmoh	(France) Jean-Philippe Fleurian (United States) Todd Witsken	6–7, 6–0, 7–5
