= Andrea Berger =

American tennis player

- Country (sports): United States
- Born: January 28, 1970 (age 55)

Singles
- Highest ranking: No. 227 (Nov 23, 1987)
Medal record
Maccabiah Games
Gold medal – first place	1989 Tel Aviv	Women's doubles
Silver medal – second place	1989 Tel Aviv	Women's singles

Andrea Berger (born January 28, 1970) is an American former professional tennis player. At the 1989 Maccabiah Games in Tel Aviv, she won a gold medal in the women's doubles event, and was runner-up to Ilana Berger (no relation) in the singles, earning a silver medal.

== Biography ==
Berger grew up in Florida, attending American Heritage School, and lived in Plantation, Florida. A younger sister of tennis player Jay Berger, she was a US Open junior quarter-finalist and represented the United States in the World Youth Cup.

On the professional tour, Berger made two main draw appearances at the Lipton Championships, including in 1987 when she beat Grace Kim to make the second round. She reached a best singles ranking of 227 in the world.

Berger, who is Jewish, won a gold medal and a silver medal for the United States at the 1989 Maccabiah Games in Tel Aviv. She won the women's doubles event with Jill Waldman, and was runner-up to Ilana Berger (no relation) in the singles.

In 1988-89 she became as a freshman she became the first Lady Gator to win 20 matches in a season. Between 1989 and 1991 she played collegiate tennis for the University of Florida. Now, Berger plays mixed doubles with her husband in the USTA league where they have been reigning champions for the past ten years together.
