= Jonna Jonerup =

Swedish tennis player

- Country (sports): Sweden
- Born: 22 July 1969 (age 55)
- Prize money: $50,753

Singles
- Career record: 71–78
- Career titles: 3 ITF
- Highest ranking: No. 147 (2 January 1989)

Grand Slam singles results
- Australian Open: 1R (1989)
- French Open: 1R (1988)

Doubles
- Career record: 47–45
- Career titles: 2 ITF
- Highest ranking: No. 184 (1 April 1991)

Grand Slam doubles results
- Australian Open: 1R (1989)

Jonna Opitz (born 22 July 1969) is a Swedish former professional tennis player. She played under the name Jonna Jonerup.

== Biography ==
Jonerup reached a best singles ranking of 147 in the world competing on the professional tour. In 1988 she was a quarter-finalist at the Taipei Women's Championships and had a win over Jana Novotná at the European Indoors in Zurich.

Between 1988 and 1991, Jonerup featured in four Federation Cup ties for Sweden. She was unbeaten in her three doubles rubbers, with her only loss coming in her sole singles appearance.

She is now known as Jonna Opitz and is an executive for manufacturing company Inwido in Malmö.

== ITF finals ==
$75,000 tournaments
$50,000 tournaments
$25,000 tournaments
$10,000 tournaments

=== Singles (3–1) ===
Result	No.	Date	Tournament	Surface	Opponent	Score
Win	1.	9 May 1987	ITF Bournemouth, United Kingdom	Hard	(United Kingdom) Sarah Sullivan	2–6, 6–3, 6–3
Loss	2.	27 September 1987	ITF Šibenik, Yugoslavia	Clay	(Netherlands) Hester Witvoet	3–6, 0–6
Win	3.	7 February 1988	ITF Stockholm, Sweden	Carpet (i)	(United States) Jennifer Fuchs	6–4, 6–0
Win	4.	13 November 1989	ITF Telford, United Kingdom	Hard (i)	(Germany) Andrea Müller	2–6, 6–3, 7–5

=== Doubles (2–4) ===
Result	No.	Date	Tournament	Surface	Partner	Opponents	Score
Loss	1.	19 January 1987	ITF Stockholm, Sweden	Carpet (i)	(Sweden) Maria Strandlund	(Sweden) Catrin Jexell (Sweden) Helena Olsson	2–6, 3–6
Win	2.	2 February 1987	ITF Hørsholm, Denmark	Carpet (i)	(Sweden) Maria Strandlund	(Sweden) Maria Ekstrand (Denmark) Lone Vandborg	6–1, 6–3
Loss	3.	21 September 1987	ITF Šibenik, Yugoslavia	Clay	(Sweden) Maria Strandlund	(Netherlands) Yvonne der Kinderen (Netherlands) Hester Witvoet	3–6, 3–6
Loss	4.	1 February 1988	ITF Jönköping, Sweden	Carpet (i)	(Sweden) Maria Strandlund	(United States) Jennifer Fuchs (United States) Jill Smoller	2–6, 4–6
Win	5.	8 February 1988	ITF Stavanger, Norway	Carpet (i)	(Sweden) Maria Strandlund	(France) Sophie Amiach (United States) Lisa Bobby	6–2, 7–6
Loss	6.	24 June 1991	ITF Ronneby, Sweden	Clay	(Netherlands) Simone Schilder	(United States) Jessica Emmons (Sweden) Maria Lindström	6–3, 2–6, 4–6

== See also ==
- List of Sweden Fed Cup team representatives
