= 1987 Wimbledon Championships – Boys' singles =

Boys' singles
- 1987 Wimbledon Championships

Final
- Champion: (Italy) Diego Nargiso
- Runner-up: (Australia) Jason Stoltenberg
- Score: 7–6^{(8–6)}, 6–4

Events
Singles	men	women		boys	girls
Doubles	men	women	mixed	boys	girls
WC Singles	men	women	quad
WC Doubles	men	women	quad
Legends	men	women	seniors
← 1986 ·	Wimbledon Championships	· 1988 →

Diego Nargiso defeated Jason Stoltenberg in the final, 7–6^{(8–6)}, 6–4 to win the boys' singles tennis title at the 1987 Wimbledon Championships.

== Seeds ==
1. n/a
2. (United States) Jim Courier (semifinals)
3. (Australia) Shane Barr (quarterfinals)
4. (Italy) Diego Nargiso (champion)
5. (United States) Martin Blackman (first round)
6. (Australia) Jason Stoltenberg (final)
7. (Italy) Eugenio Rossi (third round)
8. (Australia) Todd Woodbridge (third round)
9. (Venezuela) Nicolás Pereira (second round)
10. (United States) David Wheaton (third round)
11. (Portugal) Nuno Marques (first round)
12. (New Zealand) Brett Steven (third round)
13. (Zimbabwe) Byron Black (quarterfinals)
14. n/a
15. (Brazil) Marcus Barbosa (semifinals)
16. (Argentina) Gustavo Carbonari (second round)

Click on the seed number of a player to go to their draw section.

== Draw ==
=== Key ===
- Q = Qualifier
- WC = Wild card
- LL = Lucky loser
- Alt = Alternate
- SE = Special exempt
- PR = Protected ranking
- ITF = ITF entry
- JE = Junior exempt
- w/o = Walkover
- r = Retired
- d = Defaulted
- SR = Special ranking

=== Finals ===
Quarterfinals
(United States) MaliVai Washington	2	6	3
15	(Brazil) Marcus Barbosa	6	3	6
4	(Italy) Diego Nargiso	6	6
(Brazil) Otávio Della	2	3
6	(Australia) Jason Stoltenberg	6	3	6
3	(Australia) Shane Barr	4	6	3
13	(Zimbabwe) Byron Black	6	4	5
(United States) Jim Courier	4	6	7

Semifinals
15	(Brazil) Marcus Barbosa	3	6^{4}
4	(Italy) Diego Nargiso	6	7^{7}
6	(Australia) Jason Stoltenberg	6	1	12
2	(United States) Jim Courier	4	6	10

Final
4	(Italy) Diego Nargiso	7^{8}	6
6	(Australia) Jason Stoltenberg	6^{6}	4

=== Top half ===
==== Section 1 ====
First round
(United States) MaliVai Washington	6	6	6
(South Africa) Marius Barnard	4	7	2
(Switzerland) Carlos Fresneda	1	4
(India) Zeeshan Ali	6	6
(Indonesia) Dede Suhendar	4	7	6
(United Kingdom) Danny Sapsford	6	6	2
(The Bahamas) Mark Knowles	3	6
12	(New Zealand) Brett Steven	6	7
15	(Brazil) Marcus Barbosa	6	6
(Brazil) Luis Ruette	1	4
(Sri Lanka) Neil Rajapakse	2	2
(South Africa) Lan Bale	6	6
(Soviet Union) Andrei Cherkasov	1	4
(Ecuador) Giorgio Carneade	6	6
(United States) Francisco Montana	3	4
7	(Italy) Eugenio Rossi	6	6

Second round
(United States) M Washington	6	7	6
(India) Z Ali	7	6	2
(Indonesia) D Suhendar	3	0
12	(New Zealand) B Steven	6	6
15	(Brazil) M Barbosa	6	2	6
(South Africa) L Bale	2	6	3
(Ecuador) G Carneade	6	2
7	(Italy) E Rossi	7	6

Third round
(United States) M Washington	6	7^{7}
(New Zealand) B Steven	4	6^{5}
15	(Brazil) M Barbosa	6	4	6
7	(Italy) E Rossi	4	6	0

Quarterfinals
(United States) M Washington	2	6	3
15	(Brazil) M Barbosa	6	3	6

==== Section 2 ====
First round
4	(Italy) Diego Nargiso	6	6
(India) Ravi-Krishna Kumar	3	4
(Mexico) Mario Pacheco	7	6
(South Korea) Lee Deok-hee	5	1
(Peru) Aldo Burga	2	3
(United Kingdom) Gary Drake	6	6
(Israel) Raviv Weidenfeld	4	6
10	(United States) David Wheaton	6	7
(Mexico) Pedro Alatorre	6	4	5
(Brazil) Otávio Della	4	6	7
(Japan) Gakuji Okada	4	6	10
(Sweden) Jan Apell	6	2	8
(Chile) Rodrigo Gana	2	5
(Republic of Ireland) Owen Casey	6	7
(Czechoslovakia) Pavel Vízner	7	6
5	(United States) Martin Blackman	6	0

Second round
4	(Italy) D Nargiso	6	6
(Mexico) M Pacheco	4	2
(United Kingdom) G Drake	4	2
10	(United States) D Wheaton	6	6
(Brazil) O Della	7	7
(Japan) G Okada	6	5
(Republic of Ireland) O Casey	6	6
(Czechoslovakia) P Vízner	4	3

Third round
4	(Italy) D Nargiso	6	7^{10}
10	(United States) D Wheaton	3	6^{8}
(Brazil) O Della	7	0	6
(Republic of Ireland) O Casey	5	6	1

Quarterfinals
4	(Italy) D Nargiso	6	6
(Brazil) O Della	2	3

=== Bottom half ===
==== Section 3 ====
First round
6	(Australia) Jason Stoltenberg	6	7
(United Kingdom) Mark Petchey	1	5
(Argentina) Agustín Garizzio	4	2
(Spain) José Luis Aparisi	6	6
(Belgium) Gunter Vanderveeren	4	6
(West Germany) Rüdiger Haas	6	7
(Finland) Janne Holtari	0	6	3
16	(Argentina) Gustavo Carbonari	6	4	6
9	(Venezuela) Nicolás Pereira	7	6
(Canada) Fabio Walker	5	4
(Sweden) Peter Nyborg	7	6
(United States) Jonathan Stark	5	1
(West Germany) Michael Schmidtmann	6	6
(Indonesia) Daniel Heryanto	1	1
(Brazil) Roberto Jabali	6	4	19
3	(Australia) Shane Barr	2	6	21

Second round
6	(Australia) J Stoltenberg	6	7
(Spain) JL Aparisi	3	6
(West Germany) R Haas	7	6
16	(Argentina) G Carbonari	6	3
9	(Venezuela) N Pereira	6	3
(Sweden) P Nyborg	7	6
(West Germany) M Schmidtmann	3	0^{r}
3	(Australia) S Barr	6	1

Third round
6	(Australia) J Stoltenberg	6	6
(West Germany) R Haas	1	4
(Sweden) P Nyborg	2	4
3	(Australia) S Barr	6	6

Quarterfinals
6	(Australia) J Stoltenberg	6	3	6
3	(Australia) S Barr	4	6	3

==== Section 4 ====
First round
8	(Australia) Todd Woodbridge	7	6	6
(Ivory Coast) Clement N'Goran	5	7	1
(United Kingdom) Darren Kirk	6	6
(Pakistan) Usman Rahim	0	1
(Brazil) Sergio Sarli	7	5	4
(Japan) Ryuso Tsujino	6	7	6
(South Africa) David Nainkin	6	2^{r}
13	(Zimbabwe) Byron Black	7	2
11	(Portugal) Nuno Marques	7	4	6
(South Africa) Piet Norval	5	6	8
(United Kingdom) Colin Beecher	6	6	4
(Brazil) Fabio Silberberg	1	7	6
(Luxembourg) Jacques Radoux	6	6	6
(Peru) José Luis Noriega	2	7	1
(Mexico) Luis Herrera	4	5
2	(United States) Jim Courier	6	7

Second round
8	(Australia) T Woodbridge	6	6
(United Kingdom) D Kirk	4	4
(Japan) R Tsujino	0	0
13	(Zimbabwe) B Black	6	6
(South Africa) P Norval	6	6
(Brazil) F Silberberg	4	2
(Luxembourg) J Radoux	3	3
2	(United States) J Courier	6	6

Third round
8	(Australia) T Woodbridge	2	6	1
13	(Zimbabwe) B Black	6	3	6
(South Africa) P Norval	4	7^{7}	1
2	(United States) J Courier	6	6^{4}	6

Quarterfinals
13	(Zimbabwe) B Black	6	4	5
2	(United States) J Courier	4	6	7
