= 1987 Wimbledon Championships – Boys' doubles =

Boys' doubles
- 1987 Wimbledon Championships

Final
- Champions: (Australia) Jason Stoltenberg (Australia) Todd Woodbridge
- Runners-up: (Italy) Diego Nargiso (Italy) Eugenio Rossi
- Score: 6–3, 7–6^{(7–2)}

Events
Singles	men	women		boys	girls
Doubles	men	women	mixed	boys	girls
WC Singles	men	women	quad
WC Doubles	men	women	quad
Legends	men	women	seniors
← 1986 ·	Wimbledon Championships	· 1988 →

Jason Stoltenberg and Todd Woodbridge defeated Diego Nargiso and Eugenio Rossi in the final, 6–3, 7–6^{(7–2)} to win the boys' doubles tennis title at the 1987 Wimbledon Championships.

== Seeds ==
1. (Italy) Diego Nargiso / (Italy) Eugenio Rossi (final)
2. (India) Zeeshan Ali / (New Zealand) Brett Steven (semifinals)
3. (Australia) Jason Stoltenberg / (Australia) Todd Woodbridge (champions)
4. (South Africa) Lan Bale / (Venezuela) Nicolás Pereira (semifinals)

== Draw ==
=== Key ===
- Q = Qualifier
- WC = Wild card
- LL = Lucky loser
- Alt = Alternate
- SE = Special exempt
- PR = Protected ranking
- ITF = ITF entry
- JE = Junior exempt
- w/o = Walkover
- r = Retired
- d = Defaulted
- SR = Special ranking

=== Draw ===
First round
1	(Italy) Diego Nargiso (Italy) Eugenio Rossi	6	2	6
(Peru) Aldo Burga (Peru) José Luis Noriega	1	6	4
(South Africa) Marius Barnard (South Africa) Piet Norval	4	4
(Australia) Shane Barr (United States) Martin Blackman	6	6
4	(South Africa) Lan Bale (Venezuela) Nicolás Pereira	5	6	6
(Indonesia) Dede Suhendar (Indonesia) Daniel Heryanto	7	3	4
(Mexico) Luis Herrera (Mexico) Mario Pacheco	4	4
(Sweden) Jan Apell (Sweden) Peter Nyborg	6	6
(United States) MaliVai Washington (United States) David Wheaton	6	6
(Chile) Rodrigo Gana (Argentina) Agustín Garizzio	4	4
(United Kingdom) Darren Kirk (United Kingdom) Danny Sapsford	0	3
3	(Australia) Jason Stoltenberg (Australia) Todd Woodbridge	6	6
(Brazil) Roberto Jabali (Brazil) Sergio Sarli	7^{7}	4	2
(United States) Jim Courier (United States) Jonathan Stark	6^{4}	6	6
(Zimbabwe) Byron Black (Ivory Coast) Clement N'Goran	3	6^{4}
2	(India) Zeeshan Ali (New Zealand) Brett Steven	6	7^{7}

Quarterfinals
1	(Italy) Diego Nargiso (Italy) Eugenio Rossi	6	6
(Australia) Shane Barr (United States) Martin Blackman	4	2
4	(South Africa) Lan Bale (Venezuela) Nicolás Pereira	6	6
(Sweden) Jan Apell (Sweden) Peter Nyborg	4	4
(United States) MaliVai Washington (United States) David Wheaton	6^{6}	4
3	(Australia) Jason Stoltenberg (Australia) Todd Woodbridge	7^{8}	6
(United States) Jim Courier (United States) Jonathan Stark	6^{5}	4
2	(India) Zeeshan Ali (New Zealand) Brett Steven	7^{7}	6

Semifinals
1	(Italy) Diego Nargiso (Italy) Eugenio Rossi	7^{7}	7
4	(South Africa) Lan Bale (Venezuela) Nicolás Pereira	6^{3}	5
3	(Australia) Jason Stoltenberg (Australia) Todd Woodbridge	6	6
2	(India) Zeeshan Ali (New Zealand) Brett Steven	4	2

Final
1	(Italy) Diego Nargiso (Italy) Eugenio Rossi	3	6^{2}
3	(Australia) Jason Stoltenberg (Australia) Todd Woodbridge	6	7^{7}
