= 1987 Wimbledon Championships – Mixed doubles =

Mixed doubles
- 1987 Wimbledon Championships

Final
- Champions: (United Kingdom) Jeremy Bates (United Kingdom) Jo Durie
- Runners-up: (Australia) Darren Cahill (Australia) Nicole Provis
- Score: 7–6^{(12–10)}, 6–3

Details
- Draw: 64 (3 Q / 4 WC )
- Seeds: 16

Events
Singles	men	women		boys	girls
Doubles	men	women	mixed	boys	girls
WC Singles	men	women	quad
WC Doubles	men	women	quad
Legends	men	women	seniors
← 1986 ·	Wimbledon Championships	· 1988 →

Ken Flach and Kathy Jordan were the defending champions but lost in the quarterfinals to Andy Kohlberg and Patty Fendick.

Jeremy Bates and Jo Durie defeated Darren Cahill and Nicole Provis in the final, 7–6^{(12–10)}, 6–3 to win the mixed doubles tennis title at the 1987 Wimbledon Championships.

== Seeds ==
1. (United States) Ken Flach / (United States) Kathy Jordan (quarterfinals)
2. n/a
3. (United States) Peter Fleming / (United States) Betsy Nagelsen (third round)
4. n/a
5. n/a
6. n/a
7. (South Africa) Danie Visser / (South Africa) Rosalyn Fairbank (semifinals)
8. (Australia) Mark Kratzmann / (United States) Elise Burgin (first round)
9. (Australia) Kim Warwick / (Australia) Jenny Byrne (second round)
10. (United States) Sherwood Stewart / (United States) Anne Smith (first round)
11. (South Africa) Gary Muller / (United States) Anne White (second round)
12. (United States) Robert Van't Hof / (United States) Mary-Lou Piatek (first round)
13. (United States) Andy Kohlberg / (United States) Patty Fendick (semifinals)
14. (Denmark) Michael Mortensen / (Denmark) Tine Scheuer-Larsen (quarterfinals)
15. (Australia) John Fitzgerald / (Australia) Elizabeth Smylie (quarterfinals)
16. (United States) Robert Seguso / (Canada) Carling Bassett (first round)

Click on the seed number of a player to go to their draw section.

== Draw ==
=== Key ===
- Q = Qualifier
- WC = Wild card
- LL = Lucky loser
- Alt = Alternate
- SE = Special exempt
- PR = Protected ranking
- ITF = ITF entry
- JE = Junior exempt
- w/o = Walkover
- r = Retired
- d = Defaulted
- SR = Special ranking

=== Finals ===
Quarterfinals
1	(United States) Ken Flach (United States) Kathy Jordan	3	6	6
13	(United States) Andy Kohlberg (United States) Patty Fendick	6	3	8
(Spain) Sergio Casal (Italy) Raffaella Reggi	4	4
(Australia) Darren Cahill (Australia) Nicole Provis	6	6
(United Kingdom) Jeremy Bates (United Kingdom) Jo Durie	6	7^{7}
14	(Denmark) Michael Mortensen (Denmark) Tine Scheuer-Larsen	4	6^{2}
7	(South Africa) Danie Visser (South Africa) Rosalyn Fairbank	6	5	6
15	(Australia) John Fitzgerald (Australia) Elizabeth Smylie	3	7	4

Semifinals
13	(United States) Andy Kohlberg (United States) Patty Fendick	3	6^{5}
(Australia) Darren Cahill (Australia) Nicole Provis	6	7^{7}
(United Kingdom) Jeremy Bates (United Kingdom) Jo Durie	7^{7}	6
7	(South Africa) Danie Visser (South Africa) Rosalyn Fairbank	6^{4}	3

Final
(Australia) Darren Cahill (Australia) Nicole Provis	6^{10}	3
(United Kingdom) Jeremy Bates (United Kingdom) Jo Durie	7^{12}	6

=== Top half ===
==== Section 1 ====
First round
1	(United States) K Flach (United States) K Jordan	6	6
(Brazil) C Motta (Brazil) C Monteiro	3	0
(United States) K Jones (France) P Paradis	4	4
(United States) M Bauer (United States) C Benjamin	6	6
WC	(United Kingdom) J Southcombe (United Kingdom) S Gomer	7	7
(Australia) S Youl (Australia) L O'Neill	5	5
(New Zealand) R Simpson (New Zealand) B Cordwell	6	4	9
16	(United States) R Seguso (Canada) C Bassett	2	6	7
13	(United States) A Kohlberg (United States) P Fendick	6	4	6
(United States) R Baxter (United States) C Reynolds	4	6	4
WC	(United Kingdom) J Feaver (United Kingdom) V Wade	7	4	2
(United States) R Leach (United States) P Barg	6	6	6
(Chile) R Acuña (Canada) J Hetherington	4	7	6
(United States) C Cox (United States) W White	6	6	2
(United States) T Pawsat (United States) E Herr	6	6	6
8	(Australia) M Kratzmann (United States) E Burgin	3	7	3

Second round
1	(United States) K Flach (United States) K Jordan	7	7
(United States) M Bauer (United States) C Benjamin	6	5
WC	(United Kingdom) J Southcombe (United Kingdom) S Gomer	4	2
(New Zealand) R Simpson (New Zealand) B Cordwell	6	6
13	(United States) A Kohlberg (United States) P Fendick	6	6
(United States) R Leach (United States) P Barg	4	4
(Chile) R Acuña (Canada) J Hetherington	7	6	6
(United States) T Pawsat (United States) E Herr	5	7	2

Third round
1	(United States) K Flach (United States) K Jordan	6^{3}	7^{7}	6
(New Zealand) R Simpson (New Zealand) B Cordwell	7^{7}	6^{3}	3
13	(United States) A Kohlberg (United States) P Fendick	6	6
(Chile) R Acuña (Canada) J Hetherington	4	4

Quarterfinals
1	(United States) K Flach (United States) K Jordan	3	6	6
13	(United States) A Kohlberg (United States) P Fendick	6	3	8

==== Section 2 ====
First round
LL	(Australia) C Fancutt (United Kingdom) L Gracie	3	2
(United States) B Buffington (Netherlands) N Jagerman	6	6
(Netherlands) M Schapers (United States) A Henricksson	6	6	7
(Australia) D Tyson (Australia) L Field	7	3	9
(Spain) S Casal (Italy) R Reggi	2	7	7
(United Kingdom) J Lloyd (Australia) W Turnbull	6	5	5
(United States) T Nelson (United States) L McNeil	3	4
11	(South Africa) G Muller (United States) A White	6	6
10	(United States) S Stewart (United States) A Smith	4	3
(Australia) D Cahill (Australia) N Provis	6	6
(Australia) D Macpherson (South Africa) D van Rensburg	6	6
(Australia) P Doohan (Australia) D Balestrat	7	7
(United States) W Scanlon (United States) S Mascarin	3	2
(United States) L Scott (United States) H Ludloff	6	6
(Australia) M Fancutt (United States) S Walsh-Pete	w/o
LL	(Japan) H Shirato (Japan) M Yanagi

Second round
(United States) B Buffington (Netherlands) N Jagerman	6	6	6
(Australia) D Tyson (Australia) L Field	7	3	4
(Spain) S Casal (Italy) R Reggi	w/o
11	(South Africa) G Muller (United States) A White
(Australia) D Cahill (Australia) N Provis	7	6
(Australia) P Doohan (Australia) D Balestrat	5	3
(United States) L Scott (United States) H Ludloff	7	6
(Australia) M Fancutt (United States) S Walsh-Pete	6	4

Third round
(United States) B Buffington (Netherlands) N Jagerman	1	6	1
(Spain) S Casal (Italy) R Reggi	6	3	6
(Australia) D Cahill (Australia) N Provis	6	6
(United States) L Scott (United States) H Ludloff	3	3

Quarterfinals
(Spain) S Casal (Italy) R Reggi	4	4
(Australia) D Cahill (Australia) N Provis	6	6

=== Bottom half ===
==== Section 3 ====
First round
LL	(Soviet Union) A Olhovskiy (Soviet Union) L Meskhi	6	6
(Australia) M Woodforde (Australia) M Jaggard	4	3
(United States) J Grabb (United States) R White	6	5
(South Africa) E Edwards (South Africa) E Reinach	7	7
Q	(Australia) T Woodbridge (Hong Kong) P Moreno	1	4
(United Kingdom) J Bates (United Kingdom) J Durie	6	6
(United States) J Pugh (France) C Suire	6	4
9	(Australia) K Warwick (Australia) J Byrne	7	6
14	(Denmark) M Mortensen (Denmark) T Scheuer-Larsen	6	6
(Australia) R Barlow (United States) J Golder	2	2
(Czechoslovakia) P Složil (Peru) L Gildemeister	6	6	7
(United Kingdom) A Castle (United Kingdom) A Hobbs	4	7	5
WC	(Australia) O Davidson (United Kingdom) A Croft	6	6	9
(Australia) B Drewett (United States) S Collins	7	1	7
(United States) P Chamberlin (United States) B Gerken	3	6	7
3	(United States) P Fleming (United States) E Nagelsen	6	3	9

Second round
LL	(Soviet Union) A Olhovskiy (Soviet Union) L Meskhi	1	2
(South Africa) E Edwards (South Africa) E Reinach	6	6
(United Kingdom) J Bates (United Kingdom) J Durie	3	7	6
9	(Australia) K Warwick (Australia) J Byrne	6	6	4
14	(Denmark) M Mortensen (Denmark) T Scheuer-Larsen	w/o
(Czechoslovakia) P Složil (Peru) L Gildemeister
WC	(Australia) O Davidson (United Kingdom) A Croft	2	7	3
3	(United States) P Fleming (United States) E Nagelsen	6	6	6

Third round
(South Africa) E Edwards (South Africa) E Reinach	3	4
(United Kingdom) J Bates (United Kingdom) J Durie	6	6
14	(Denmark) M Mortensen (Denmark) T Scheuer-Larsen	6	6
3	(United States) P Fleming (United States) E Nagelsen	4	3

Quarterfinals
(United Kingdom) J Bates (United Kingdom) J Durie	6	7^{7}
14	(Denmark) M Mortensen (Denmark) T Scheuer-Larsen	4	6^{2}

==== Section 4 ====
First round
7	(South Africa) D Visser (South Africa) R Fairbank	7	5	6
(United States) M Purcell (United States) P Smith	5	7	3
(South Africa) C van Rensburg (South Africa) M Reinach	6	6	9
(South Africa) B Levine (United States) M Van Nostrand	0	7	7
WC	(United States) D Ralston (United States) MJ Fernández	4	2
Q	(United States) J Letts (United States) L Antonoplis	6	6
(Australia) L Warder (West Germany) C Porwik	6	5	6
12	(United States) R Van't Hof (United States) M-L Piatek	4	7	4
15	(Australia) J Fitzgerald (Australia) E Smylie	6	6
Q	(South Africa) D Maasdorp (United States) T Mochizuki	1	1
(Sweden) S Svensson (Sweden) C Lindqvist	6	6
(Canada) G Michibata (Hong Kong) P Hy	3	4
(New Zealand) K Evernden (United States) J Kaplan	6	6
LL	(Australia) K Hutter (United States) S Norris	1	1
(Canada) G Connell (Canada) H Kelesi	6	7
LL	(United Kingdom) D Roberts (United Kingdom) T Catlin	3	5

Second round
7	(South Africa) D Visser (South Africa) R Fairbank	6	6
(South Africa) C van Rensburg (South Africa) M Reinach	3	2
Q	(United States) J Letts (United States) L Antonoplis	3	3
(Australia) L Warder (West Germany) C Porwik	6	6
15	(Australia) J Fitzgerald (Australia) E Smylie	6	6
(Sweden) S Svensson (Sweden) C Lindqvist	0	2
(New Zealand) K Evernden (United States) J Kaplan	7	6
(Canada) G Connell (Canada) H Kelesi	6	4

Third round
7	(South Africa) D Visser (South Africa) R Fairbank	6	7^{7}
(Australia) L Warder (West Germany) C Porwik	3	6^{4}
15	(Australia) J Fitzgerald (Australia) E Smylie	6	6
(New Zealand) K Evernden (United States) J Kaplan	1	3

Quarterfinals
7	(South Africa) D Visser (South Africa) R Fairbank	6	5	6
15	(Australia) J Fitzgerald (Australia) E Smylie	3	7	4
