= Eugenio Rossi (tennis) =

Italian tennis player

- Country (sports): Italy
- Born: November 10, 1969 (age 56) Italy
- Plays: Right-handed
- Prize money: $22,110

Singles
- Career record: 1–4
- Career titles: 0; 0 Challenger, 0 Futures
- Highest ranking: No. 410 (31 July 1989)

Grand Slam singles results
- Australian Open: Q1 (1987)

Doubles
- Career record: 5–14
- Career titles: 0; 0 Challenger, 0 Futures
- Highest ranking: No. 219 (10 August 1987)
Medal record
Mediterranean Games
Gold medal – first place	1987 Latakia	Doubles
- Last updated on: 1 June 2022.

Eugenio Rossi (born November 10, 1969) is an Italian retired professional tennis player who won a gold medal at the 1987 Mediterranean Games. He appeared in the main draw of the 1989 Grand Prix tournament in Bari, where he defeated Michele Fioroni before losing to Alejandro Aramburú.

== Junior Grand Slam finals ==
=== Doubles: 1 (1 runner-up) ===
Result	Year	Tournament	Surface	Partnet	Opponents	Score
Loss	1987	Wimbledon	Grass	(Italy) Diego Nargiso	(Australia) Todd Woodbridge (Australia) Jason Stoltenberg	3–6, 6–7^{(2–7)}

== ATP Challenger and ITF Futures finals ==
=== Doubles: 1 (0–1) ===
Legend ATP Challenger (0–1) ITF Futures (0–0)	Finals by surface Hard (0–0) Clay (0–1) Grass (0–0) Carpet (0–0)

Result	W–L	Date	Tournament	Tier	Surface	Partner	Opponents	Score
Loss	0–1	Oct 1991	Reggio Calabria, Italy	Challenger	Clay	(Italy) Massimo Boscatto	(Italy) Cristian Brandi (Italy) Federico Mordegan	5–7, 3–6
