= Teresa Catlin =

British tennis player

- Country (sports): (United Kingdom) Great Britain
- Born: 13 February 1969 (age 57)
- Plays: Right-handed
- Prize money: $17,231

Singles
- Career record: 16–31
- Highest ranking: No. 214 (14 March 1988)

Grand Slam singles results
- Australian Open: 1R (1988)
- French Open: Q1 (1988)
- Wimbledon: 1R (1987, 1988)

Doubles
- Career record: 4–10
- Highest ranking: No. 223 (18 July 1988)

Grand Slam doubles results
- Wimbledon: Q2 (1987)

Grand Slam mixed doubles results
- Wimbledon: 2R (1988)

Teresa Catlin (born 13 February 1969) is a British former professional tennis player. She is still active in senior tennis and in 2020 was named 'Women's Senior Player of the Year' by the Lawn Tennis Association.

Catlin, a Cambridge-based player, reached a career high singles ranking of 214 on the professional tour, in a career which included main draw appearance at the Australian Open and Wimbledon.

On the WTA Tour, Catlin's best performances were making the second round at both Auckland and Wellington in 1988, with wins over Pam Casale and Monique Javer respectively.

== ITF finals ==
=== Singles: 1 (0–1) ===
Outcome	Date	Tournament	Surface	Opponent	Score
Runner–up	16 November 1987	Croydon, United Kingdom	Carpet	(Soviet Union) Natalia Medvedeva	6–2, 6–3
