= 1987 Wimbledon Championships – Men's singles =

Men's singles
- 1987 Wimbledon Championships

Final
- Champion: (Australia) Pat Cash
- Runner-up: (Czechoslovakia) Ivan Lendl
- Score: 7–6^{(7–5)}, 6–2, 7–5

Details
- Draw: 128 (16 Q / 8 WC )
- Seeds: 16

Events
Singles	men	women		boys	girls
Doubles	men	women	mixed	boys	girls
WC Singles	men	women	quad
WC Doubles	men	women	quad
Legends	men	women	seniors
← 1986 ·	Wimbledon Championships	· 1988 →

Pat Cash defeated Ivan Lendl in the final, 7–6^{(7–5)}, 6–2, 7–5 to win the gentlemen's singles tennis title at the 1987 Wimbledon Championships. It was Cash's first and only major title. Lendl was the losing finalist for the second consecutive year.

Boris Becker was the two-time defending champion, but lost in the second round to Peter Doohan.

This marked the first Wimbledon appearance of future champion Andre Agassi, losing in the first round to Henri Leconte. Agassi would not compete at Wimbledon again until 1991 due to his disagreement with the All England Club's all-white dress code.

== Seeds ==
1. (West Germany) Boris Becker (second round)
2. (Czechoslovakia) Ivan Lendl (final)
3. (Sweden) Mats Wilander (quarterfinals)
4. (Sweden) Stefan Edberg (semifinals)
5. (Czechoslovakia) Miloslav Mečíř (third round)
6. (France) Yannick Noah (second round)
7. (United States) Jimmy Connors (semifinals)
8. (Ecuador) Andrés Gómez (fourth round)
9. (France) Henri Leconte (quarterfinals)
10. (United States) Tim Mayotte (third round)
11. (Australia) Pat Cash (champion)
12. (United States) Brad Gilbert (third round)
13. (Sweden) Joakim Nyström (third round)
14. (Spain) Emilio Sánchez (fourth round)
15. (United States) David Pate (second round)
16. (United States) Kevin Curren (second round)

Click on the seed number of a player to go to their draw section.

== Draw ==
=== Key ===
- Q = Qualifier
- WC = Wild card
- LL = Lucky loser
- Alt = Alternate
- ITF = ITF entry
- PR = Protected ranking
- SR = Special ranking
- SE = Special exempt
- JE = Junior exempt
- JR = Junior Accelerator Programme entrant
- CO = College Accelerator Programme entrant
- NG = Next Gen Accelerator Program entrant
- w/o = Walkover
- r = Retired
- d = Defaulted

=== Finals ===
Quarterfinals
(Socialist Federal Republic of Yugoslavia) Slobodan Živojinović	6^{5}	5	3
7	(United States) Jimmy Connors	7^{7}	7	6
3	(Sweden) Mats Wilander	3	5	4
11	(Australia) Pat Cash	6	7	6
(Sweden) Anders Järryd	6	4	1	3
4	(Sweden) Stefan Edberg	4	6	6	6
9	(France) Henri Leconte	6^{5}	3	6^{6}
2	(Czechoslovakia) Ivan Lendl	7^{7}	6	7^{8}

Semifinals
7	(United States) Jimmy Connors	4	4	1
11	(Australia) Pat Cash	6	6	6
4	(Sweden) Stefan Edberg	6	4	6^{8}	4
2	(Czechoslovakia) Ivan Lendl	3	6	7^{10}	6

Final
11	(Australia) Pat Cash	7^{7}	6	7
2	(Czechoslovakia) Ivan Lendl	6^{5}	2	5

=== Top half ===
==== Section 1 ====
First round
1	(West Germany) B Becker	6	6	6
(Czechoslovakia) K Nováček	4	2	4
(Austria) A Antonitsch	6	5	2	6	7
(Australia) P Doohan	4	7	6	4	9
(Italy) C Panatta	6	6	6	6	6
(United States) J Grabb	4	7	7	4	3
(United States) M Kures	3	4	3
Q	(United States) L Shiras	6	6	6
(Nigeria) N Odizor	3	7	3	3
(United States) S Giammalva	6	6	6	6
(United States) P Fleming	6	6	6
WC	(United Kingdom) J Bates	7	7	7
(Socialist Federal Republic of Yugoslavia) S Živojinović	3	6	6	6
Q	(United States) M Flur	6	3	4	0
(Spain) S Casal	4	6	5
15	(United States) D Pate	6	7	7

Second round
1	(West Germany) B Becker	6	6	2	4
(Australia) P Doohan	7	4	6	6
(Italy) C Panatta	3	6	6	6
Q	(United States) L Shiras	6	7	3	7
(United States) S Giammalva	3	3	2
WC	(United Kingdom) J Bates	6	6	6
(Socialist Federal Republic of Yugoslavia) S Živojinović	3	7	6	6
15	(United States) D Pate	6	6	4	1

Third round
(Australia) P Doohan	6	4	6	6	12
Q	(United States) L Shiras	7	6	3	4	10
WC	(United Kingdom) J Bates	6	5	6
(Socialist Federal Republic of Yugoslavia) S Živojinović	7	7	7

Fourth round
(Australia) P Doohan	2	4	6^{11}
(Socialist Federal Republic of Yugoslavia) S Živojinović	6	6	7^{13}

==== Section 2 ====
First round
10	(United States) T Mayotte	6	6	6
(France) J-P Fleurian	2	3	3
(United States) T Wilkison	7	6	6	6
(United States) J Pugh	5	7	4	4
(Sweden) M Pernfors	3	6	6	6	10
(United States) R Seguso	6	3	2	7	8
(South Africa) C Steyn	6	6	6
(Australia) C Limberger	3	2	4
(United States) D Goldie	3	6	4	5
(New Zealand) K Evernden	6	4	6	7
(South Africa) D Visser	3	7	6	6
(Brazil) L Mattar	6	6	4	4
(United States) T Witsken	3	4	3
WC	(United Kingdom) S Shaw	6	6	6
(United States) M Davis	1	6	6
7	(United States) J Connors	6	7	7

Second round
10	(United States) T Mayotte	6	4	6	6	6
(United States) T Wilkison	3	6	7	2	4
(Sweden) M Pernfors	6	6	6
(South Africa) C Steyn	3	3	2
(New Zealand) K Evernden	6	7	6
(South Africa) D Visser	2	6	1
WC	(United Kingdom) S Shaw	2	6	3	4
7	(United States) J Connors	6	2	6	6

Third round
10	(United States) T Mayotte	6	6	4	3	5
(Sweden) M Pernfors	2	4	6	6	7
(New Zealand) K Evernden	1	2	7	3
7	(United States) J Connors	6	6	6	6

Fourth round
(Sweden) M Pernfors	6	6	5	4	2
7	(United States) J Connors	1	1	7	6	6

==== Section 3 ====
First round
3	(Sweden) M Wilander	6	6	6
Q	(South Africa) G Muller	2	1	4
(United States) M Leach	4	4	4
(Sweden) J Gunnarsson	6	6	6
(Sweden) J Svensson	5	6	6	2	6
Q	(Australia) S Youl	7	1	3	6	3
(Brazil) I Kley	4	6	6	3
(South Africa) E Edwards	6	3	7	6
(South Africa) C van Rensburg	6	6	7	6
(Sweden) T Högstedt	4	7	6	3
(Sweden) C Bergström	6	6	1	3	13
(Sweden) P Lundgren	4	2	6	6	11
(Peru) J Yzaga	6	6	2	6	2
(West Germany) E Jelen	7	0	6	4	6
Q	(United States) M Bauer	4	6	2	5
14	(Spain) E Sánchez	6	3	6	7

Second round
3	(Sweden) M Wilander	6	6	6
(Sweden) J Gunnarsson	2	1	2
(Sweden) J Svensson	4	6	3	6	8
(South Africa) E Edwards	6	3	6	3	6
(South Africa) C van Rensburg	6	6	6
(Sweden) C Bergström	3	2	2
(West Germany) E Jelen	7	1	6	6	2
14	(Spain) E Sánchez	5	6	2	7	6

Third round
3	(Sweden) M Wilander	7	6	6
(Sweden) J Svensson	6	1	3
(South Africa) C van Rensburg	5	4	6
14	(Spain) E Sánchez	7	6	7

Fourth round
3	(Sweden) M Wilander	2	7^{7}	6	7
14	(Spain) E Sánchez	6	6^{1}	3	5

==== Section 4 ====
First round
11	(Australia) P Cash	6	6	6
(United States) M Freeman	0	3	2
(United States) T Nelson	3	4	6	6	17
(Australia) P McNamee	6	6	2	1	19
Q	(United States) L Scott	6	6	7
(United States) G Holmes	4	2	6
(Netherlands) M Schapers	7	6	6
(Spain) J Sánchez	5	2	2
(United States) P Annacone	7	6	6
(Czechoslovakia) M Šrejber	6	4	1
(Australia) W Masur	6	6	6
(Brazil) C Motta	2	4	4
(France) G Forget	6	6	6
(Austria) T Muster	4	4	4
(Australia) B Drewett	4	4	4
6	(France) Y Noah	6	6	6

Second round
11	(Australia) P Cash	7	6	6
(Australia) P McNamee	5	4	2
Q	(United States) L Scott	6	3	2
(Netherlands) M Schapers	7	6	6
(United States) P Annacone	6	6	7	6	6
(Australia) W Masur	7	4	6	7	3
(France) G Forget	3	7	4	6	9
6	(France) Y Noah	6	6	6	4	7

Third round
11	(Australia) P Cash	7	6	2	6
(Netherlands) M Schapers	6	2	6	4
(United States) P Annacone	6	4	6	2	4
(France) G Forget	4	6	4	6	6

Fourth round
11	(Australia) P Cash	6	6	6
(France) G Forget	2	3	4

=== Bottom half ===
==== Section 5 ====
First round
5	(Czechoslovakia) M Mečíř	6	6	7
(United States) M De Palmer	3	2	5
Q	(Australia) M Woodforde	4	3	6	6	6
(United States) K Jones	6	6	3	3	1
(West Germany) R Osterthun	3	6	4
(Sweden) A Järryd	6	7	6
(United States) D Rostagno	6	6	6
(Australia) B Dyke	2	3	4
(United States) W Scanlon	4	6	6	6	6
Q	(Nigeria) T Mmoh	6	7	2	4	4
Q	(United States) L Stefanki	4	6	3	4
Q	(Soviet Union) A Volkov	6	4	6	6
(United States) G Donnelly	6	6	5	6
WC	(United Kingdom) C Bailey	3	7	7	7
WC	(United Kingdom) S Bale	6	4	3
12	(United States) B Gilbert	7	6	6

Second round
5	(Czechoslovakia) M Mečíř	6	6	6
Q	(Australia) M Woodforde	1	3	3
(Sweden) A Järryd	6	6	3	6
(United States) D Rostagno	0	3	6	3
(United States) W Scanlon	6	6	2
Q	(Soviet Union) A Volkov	7	7	6
WC	(United Kingdom) C Bailey	2	2	4
12	(United States) B Gilbert	6	6	6

Third round
5	(Czechoslovakia) M Mečíř	3	3	3
(Sweden) A Järryd	6	6	6
Q	(Soviet Union) A Volkov	7	0	6	6
12	(United States) B Gilbert	6	6	3	4

Fourth round
(Sweden) A Järryd	7^{7}	7	6^{4}	6
Q	(Soviet Union) A Volkov	6^{5}	5	7^{7}	4

==== Section 6 ====
First round
13	(Sweden) J Nyström	6	6	6	6
(Sweden) H Sundström	2	7	4	3
(Czechoslovakia) T Šmid	6	6	6	6
Q	(Australia) D Tyson	4	4	7	3
(West Germany) A Maurer	6	6	6	5	11
(West Germany) C-U Steeb	4	7	4	7	9
(Australia) J Fitzgerald	1	4	6
(Switzerland) J Hlasek	6	6	7
(Italy) S Colombo	3	5	6
(United States) M Anger	6	7	7
(West Germany) M Westphal	3	1	3
(India) R Krishnan	6	6	6
WC	(United Kingdom) S Botfield	1	1	2
(United States) M Purcell	6	6	6
(Sweden) S Eriksson	0	0	0
4	(Sweden) S Edberg	6	6	6

Second round
13	(Sweden) J Nyström	6	6	6
(Czechoslovakia) T Šmid	3	1	4
(West Germany) A Maurer	3	6	3	3
(Switzerland) J Hlasek	6	3	6	6
(United States) M Anger	6	6	6
(India) R Krishnan	2	4	2
(United States) M Purcell	4	3	4
4	(Sweden) S Edberg	6	6	6

Third round
13	(Sweden) J Nyström	7	3	0	6
(Switzerland) J Hlasek	5	6	6	7
(United States) M Anger	6	2	2
4	(Sweden) S Edberg	7	6	6

Fourth round
(Switzerland) J Hlasek	3	7^{7}	1	4
4	(Sweden) S Edberg	6	6^{5}	6	6

==== Section 7 ====
First round
8	(Ecuador) A Gómez	6	6	7
(Austria) H Skoff	4	4	6
(United States) J Canter	7	3	4	4
(Sweden) U Stenlund	6	6	6	6
Q	(United States) K Flach	6	6	6
Q	(Argentina) R Saad	1	4	4
(United States) J Sadri	6	6	6
(Sweden) J Carlsson	1	4	1
(Israel) G Bloom	6	6	6
(West Germany) P Kühnen	3	3	2
(West Germany) P Vojtíšek	5	3	0
(Canada) M Laurendeau	7	6	6
(Israel) A Mansdorf	6	7	6
WC	(United Kingdom) N Fulwood	2	5	1
(United States) A Agassi	2	1	2
9	(France) H Leconte	6	6	6

Second round
8	(Ecuador) A Gómez	6	6	7
(Sweden) U Stenlund	3	2	6
Q	(United States) K Flach	3	6	7	6
(United States) J Sadri	6	3	6	3
(Israel) G Bloom	3	2	6	6	6
(Canada) M Laurendeau	6	6	1	3	4
(Israel) A Mansdorf	2	6	6	6	2
9	(France) H Leconte	6	7	2	1	6

Third round
8	(Ecuador) A Gómez	6	6	3	7
Q	(United States) K Flach	4	3	6	5
(Israel) G Bloom	3	6	5
9	(France) H Leconte	6	7	7

Fourth round
8	(Ecuador) A Gómez	5	5	5
9	(France) H Leconte	7	7	7

==== Section 8 ====
First round
16	(United States) K Curren	7	7	6
(United States) B Testerman	6	6	3
(Spain) J Avendaño	2	1	6	4
(United States) J Kriek	6	6	4	6
(Spain) D de Miguel	1	1	3
(United States) S Davis	6	6	6
(West Germany) D Keretić	2	3	5
WC	(India) V Amritraj	6	6	7
Q	(Soviet Union) A Olhovskiy	6	2	6	5
WC	(United Kingdom) A Castle	7	6	4	7
(Switzerland) R Stadler	7	6	3	6
Q	(United States) R Reneberg	6	7	6	7
(Italy) P Canè	6	6	7	6
(United States) J Arias	7	2	6	3
Q	(West Germany) C Saceanu	2	6	3	5
2	(Czechoslovakia) I Lendl	6	3	6	7

Second round
16	(United States) K Curren	4	6	3	2
(United States) J Kriek	6	3	6	6
(United States) S Davis	6	6	6
WC	(India) V Amritraj	3	0	4
WC	(United Kingdom) A Castle	4	6	3	4
Q	(United States) R Reneberg	6	4	6	6
(Italy) P Canè	6	6	7	5	1
2	(Czechoslovakia) I Lendl	3	7	6	7	6

Third round
(United States) J Kriek	5	6	6	6	8
(United States) S Davis	7	4	7	1	6
Q	(United States) R Reneberg	4	7	3	6
2	(Czechoslovakia) I Lendl	6	6	6	7

Fourth round
(United States) J Kriek	3	6^{4}	2
2	(Czechoslovakia) I Lendl	6	7^{7}	6

Preceded by 1987 French Open	Grand Slams; Men's singles	Succeeded by 1987 US Open
