= 1987 Wimbledon Championships – Men's doubles =

Men's doubles
- 1987 Wimbledon Championships

Final
- Champions: (United States) Ken Flach (United States) Robert Seguso
- Runners-up: (Spain) Sergio Casal (Spain) Emilio Sánchez
- Score: 3–6, 6–7^{(6–8)}, 7–6^{(7–3)}, 6–1, 6–4

Details
- Draw: 64 (5 Q / 5 WC )
- Seeds: 16

Events
Singles	men	women		boys	girls
Doubles	men	women	mixed	boys	girls
WC Singles	men	women	quad
WC Doubles	men	women	quad
Legends	men	women	seniors
← 1986 ·	Wimbledon Championships	· 1988 →

Joakim Nyström and Mats Wilander were the defending champions, but lost in the second round to Carl Limberger and Mark Woodforde.

Ken Flach and Robert Seguso defeated Sergio Casal and Emilio Sánchez in the final, 3–6, 6–7^{(6–8)}, 7–6^{(7–3)}, 6–1, 6–4 to win the gentlemen's doubles title at the 1987 Wimbledon Championships.

Stefan Edberg and Anders Järryd's semi-final loss to Casal and Sanchez was Järryd's only Men's Doubles Grand Slam loss that year, as he won the Australian Open and US Open with Edberg, and the French Open with Seguso.

== Seeds ==
1. (France) Guy Forget / (France) Yannick Noah (quarterfinals)
2. (United States) Paul Annacone / (South Africa) Christo van Rensburg (quarterfinals)
3. (Ecuador) Andrés Gómez / (Socialist Federal Republic of Yugoslavia) Slobodan Živojinović (semifinals)
4. (Sweden) Stefan Edberg / (Sweden) Anders Järryd (semifinals)
5. (Sweden) Joakim Nyström / (Sweden) Mats Wilander (second round)
6. (United States) Gary Donnelly / (United States) Peter Fleming (second round)
7. (United States) Ken Flach / (United States) Robert Seguso (champions)
8. (Spain) Sergio Casal / (Spain) Emilio Sánchez (final)
9. (United States) Chip Hooper / (United States) Mike Leach (third round)
10. (United States) Kevin Curren / (United States) Mike De Palmer (first round)
11. (South Africa) Christo Steyn / (South Africa) Danie Visser (first round)
12. (Australia) Peter Doohan / (Australia) Laurie Warder (third round)
13. (United States) Sherwood Stewart / (Australia) Kim Warwick (first round)
14. (United States) Andy Kohlberg / (United States) Robert Van't Hof (third round)
15. (United States) Scott Davis / (United States) David Pate (third round)
16. (Australia) John Fitzgerald / (Czechoslovakia) Tomáš Šmíd (first round)

Click on the seed number of a player to go to their draw section.

== Draw ==
=== Key ===
- Q = Qualifier
- WC = Wild card
- LL = Lucky loser
- Alt = Alternate
- ITF = ITF entry
- PR = Protected ranking
- SR = Special ranking
- SE = Special exempt
- JE = Junior exempt
- JR = Junior Accelerator Programme entrant
- CO = College Accelerator Programme entrant
- NG = Next Gen Accelerator Program entrant
- w/o = Walkover
- r = Retired
- d = Defaulted

=== Finals ===
Quarterfinals
1	(France) Guy Forget (France) Yannick Noah	6^{4}	6	6	3	4
7	(United States) Ken Flach (United States) Robert Seguso	7^{7}	4	4	6	6
3	(Ecuador) Andrés Gómez (Socialist Federal Republic of Yugoslavia) Slobodan Živojinović	2	7^{7}	6^{2}	7^{7}	7
(Australia) Darren Cahill (Australia) Mark Kratzmann	6	6^{2}	7^{7}	6^{5}	5
(Australia) Carl Limberger (Australia) Mark Woodforde	3	6	3	4
4	(Sweden) Stefan Edberg (Sweden) Anders Järryd	6	3	6	6
8	(Spain) Sergio Casal (Spain) Emilio Sánchez	5	6	7	6
2	(United States) Paul Annacone (South Africa) Christo van Rensburg	7	4	5	4

Semifinals
7	(United States) Ken Flach (United States) Robert Seguso	7^{8}	2	7^{7}	6
3	(Ecuador) Andrés Gómez (Socialist Federal Republic of Yugoslavia) Slobodan Živojinović	6^{6}	6	6^{5}	4
4	(Sweden) Stefan Edberg (Sweden) Anders Järryd	3	5	2
8	(Spain) Sergio Casal (Spain) Emilio Sánchez	6	7	6

Final
7	(United States) Ken Flach (United States) Robert Seguso	3	6^{6}	7^{7}	6	6
8	(Spain) Sergio Casal (Spain) Emilio Sánchez	6	7^{8}	6^{3}	1	4

=== Top half ===
==== Section 1 ====
First round
1	(France) G Forget (France) Y Noah	6	7
LL	(Australia) R Barlow (West Germany) H Rittersbacher	3	6
(Sweden) J Gunnarsson (Denmark) M Mortensen	6	6
(United States) H Pfister (Sweden) J Svensson	3	4
(United States) R Leach (United States) T Pawsat	7	6
(Australia) P McNamara (Australia) P McNamee	6	4
(New Zealand) K Evernden (United States) J Kriek	3	6	3
15	(United States) S Davis (United States) D Pate	6	3	6
9	(United States) C Hooper (United States) M Leach	6	6
(Italy) P Canè (Italy) G Ocleppo	4	2
WC	(United Kingdom) J Bates (United Kingdom) A Castle	6	6
(Sweden) R Båthman (Sweden) P Lundgren	4	3
(United States) R Baxter (United States) P Chamberlin	7	6
(Czechoslovakia) S Birner (Nigeria) T Mmoh	6	4
(United States) B Gilbert (United States) E Korita	4	4
7	(United States) K Flach (United States) R Seguso	6	6

Second round
1	(France) G Forget (France) Y Noah	7	7
(Sweden) J Gunnarsson (Denmark) M Mortensen	6	6
(United States) R Leach (United States) T Pawsat	3	6
15	(United States) S Davis (United States) D Pate	6	7
9	(United States) C Hooper (United States) M Leach	6	6
WC	(United Kingdom) J Bates (United Kingdom) A Castle	4	4
(United States) R Baxter (United States) P Chamberlin	2	4
7	(United States) K Flach (United States) R Seguso	6	6

Third round
1	(France) G Forget (France) Y Noah	6^{4}	7^{13}	6	6
15	(United States) S Davis (United States) D Pate	7^{7}	6^{11}	3	4
9	(United States) C Hooper (United States) M Leach	6^{4}	6^{4}	6^{3}
7	(United States) K Flach (United States) R Seguso	7^{7}	7^{7}	7^{7}

Quarterfinals
1	(France) G Forget (France) Y Noah	6^{4}	6	6	3	4
7	(United States) K Flach (United States) R Seguso	7^{7}	4	4	6	6

==== Section 2 ====
First round
3	(Ecuador) A Gómez (Socialist Federal Republic of Yugoslavia) S Živojinović	6	6
Q	(India) A Amritraj (Argentina) J Frana	2	3
WC	(United Kingdom) S Botfield (United Kingdom) M Walker	3	6
(United States) G Layendecker (Canada) G Michibata	6	7
(United States) J Grabb (United States) B Pearce	3	6	11
Q	(New Zealand) R Simpson (United States) L Stefanki	6	3	13
(South Africa) E Edwards (United States) J Letts	4	6	3
14	(United States) A Kohlberg (United States) R Van't Hof	6	3	6
11	(South Africa) C Steyn (South Africa) D Visser	3	4
(Australia) D Cahill (Australia) M Kratzmann	6	6
(Brazil) L Mattar (Brazil) C Motta	5	4
(South Africa) G Muller (United States) T Nelson	7	6
(Netherlands) M Schapers (Czechoslovakia) M Šrejber	7	3	4
(United States) L Bourne (United States) J Klaparda	6	6	6
(Brazil) R Acioly (Brazil) D Campos	3	6	1
6	(United States) G Donnelly (United States) P Fleming	6	3	6

Second round
3	(Ecuador) A Gómez (Socialist Federal Republic of Yugoslavia) S Živojinović	7	6
(United States) G Layendecker (Canada) G Michibata	6	4
Q	(New Zealand) R Simpson (United States) L Stefanki	4	7	4
14	(United States) A Kohlberg (United States) R Van't Hof	6	5	6
(Australia) D Cahill (Australia) M Kratzmann	6	4	6
(South Africa) G Muller (United States) T Nelson	3	6	4
(United States) L Bourne (United States) J Klaparda	7	6
6	(United States) G Donnelly (United States) P Fleming	6	4

Third round
3	(Ecuador) A Gómez (Socialist Federal Republic of Yugoslavia) S Živojinović	6	6	7^{7}
14	(United States) A Kohlberg (United States) R Van't Hof	3	4	6^{4}
(Australia) D Cahill (Australia) M Kratzmann	6	3	6	6
(United States) L Bourne (United States) J Klaparda	2	6	3	4

Quarterfinals
3	(Ecuador) A Gómez (Socialist Federal Republic of Yugoslavia) S Živojinović	2	7^{7}	6^{2}	7^{7}	7
(Australia) D Cahill (Australia) M Kratzmann	6	6^{2}	7^{7}	6^{5}	5

=== Bottom half ===
==== Section 3 ====
First round
5	(Sweden) J Nyström (Sweden) M Wilander	4	6	9
(Mexico) L Lavalle (West Germany) C Saceanu	6	3	7
(Australia) C Limberger (Australia) M Woodforde	7	6	6
WC	(United States) Ti Gullikson (United States) To Gullikson	5	7	2
(South Africa) B Levine (Sweden) M Tideman	2	3
(France) H Leconte (Czechoslovakia) M Mečíř	6	6
(Australia) B Drewett (Australia) D Tyson	4	6	3
12	(Australia) P Doohan (Australia) L Warder	6	3	6
13	(United States) S Stewart (Australia) K Warwick	6	6	4
(Chile) R Acuña (United States) M Freeman	3	7	6
WC	(United Kingdom) J Lloyd (United Kingdom) S Shaw	4	6
Q	(South Africa) P Aldrich (South Africa) W Green	6	7
(Switzerland) H Günthardt (Switzerland) J Hlasek	6	7
(Czechoslovakia) P Složil (Czechoslovakia) C Suk	1	6
(West Germany) E Jelen (United States) W Scanlon	2	5
4	(Sweden) S Edberg (Sweden) A Järryd	6	7

Second round
5	(Sweden) J Nyström (Sweden) M Wilander	6	6	6
(Australia) C Limberger (Australia) M Woodforde	3	7	8
(France) H Leconte (Czechoslovakia) M Mečíř	6	6	3
12	(Australia) P Doohan (Australia) L Warder	4	7	6
(Chile) R Acuña (United States) M Freeman	6	6
Q	(South Africa) P Aldrich (South Africa) W Green	7	7
(Switzerland) H Günthardt (Switzerland) J Hlasek	6	3	4
4	(Sweden) S Edberg (Sweden) A Järryd	3	6	6

Third round
(Australia) C Limberger (Australia) M Woodforde	7	6	3	7^{8}
12	(Australia) P Doohan (Australia) L Warder	5	4	6	6^{6}
Q	(South Africa) P Aldrich (South Africa) W Green	3	2	4
4	(Sweden) S Edberg (Sweden) A Järryd	6	6	6

Quarterfinals
(Australia) C Limberger (Australia) M Woodforde	3	6	3	4
4	(Sweden) S Edberg (Sweden) A Järryd	6	3	6	6

==== Section 4 ====
First round
8	(Spain) S Casal (Spain) E Sánchez	6	5	6
(Italy) S Colombo (Spain) D de Miguel	4	7	4
(Australia) B Dyke (Australia) W Masur	4	7	7
(United States) B Testerman (United States) T Wilkison	6	6	9
(United States) M Anger (United States) G Holmes	6	7
(Canada) G Connell (United States) L Scott	2	6
(United States) D Cassidy (United States) M Purcell	4	4
10	(United States) K Curren (United States) M De Palmer	6	6
16	(Australia) J Fitzgerald (Czechoslovakia) T Šmíd	7	6
WC	(United Kingdom) D Felgate (United Kingdom) J Goodall	6	3
(West Germany) W Popp (West Germany) U Riglewski	3	4
(United States) M Bauer (Poland) W Fibak	6	6
Q	(United States) C Cox (Australia) M Fancutt	3	5
Q	(Israel) G Bloom (Israel) A Mansdorf	6	7
(United States) K Jones (United States) J Pugh	4	6
2	(United States) P Annacone (South Africa) C van Rensburg	6	7

Second round
8	(Spain) S Casal (Spain) E Sánchez	6	7
(United States) B Testerman (United States) T Wilkison	1	6
(United States) M Anger (United States) G Holmes	4	5
10	(United States) K Curren (United States) M De Palmer	6	7
16	(Australia) J Fitzgerald (Czechoslovakia) T Šmíd	6	7
(United States) M Bauer (Poland) W Fibak	2	6
Q	(Israel) G Bloom (Israel) A Mansdorf	2	6	3
2	(United States) P Annacone (South Africa) C van Rensburg	6	3	6

Third round
8	(Spain) S Casal (Spain) E Sánchez	6	7^{10}	7^{7}
10	(United States) K Curren (United States) M De Palmer	3	6^{8}	6^{4}
16	(Australia) J Fitzgerald (Czechoslovakia) T Šmíd	7^{7}	5	3	4
2	(United States) P Annacone (South Africa) C van Rensburg	6^{4}	7	6	6

Quarterfinals
8	(Spain) S Casal (Spain) E Sánchez	5	6	7	6
2	(United States) P Annacone (South Africa) C van Rensburg	7	4	5	4
