= 1987 Wimbledon Championships – Women's singles =

Women's singles
- 1987 Wimbledon Championships

Final
- Champion: (United States) Martina Navratilova
- Runner-up: (West Germany) Steffi Graf
- Score: 7–5, 6–3

Details
- Draw: 128 (8 Q / 6 WC )
- Seeds: 16

Events
Singles	men	women		boys	girls
Doubles	men	women	mixed	boys	girls
WC Singles	men	women	quad
WC Doubles	men	women	quad
Legends	men	women	seniors
← 1986 ·	Wimbledon Championships	· 1988 →

Five-time defending champion Martina Navratilova defeated Steffi Graf in the final, 7–5, 6–3 to win the ladies' singles tennis title at the 1987 Wimbledon Championships. It was her eighth Wimbledon singles title and 16th major singles title overall. This marked the first of three years that Navratilova and Graf contested the Wimbledon final.

== Seeds ==
1. (United States) Martina Navratilova (champion)
2. (West Germany) Steffi Graf (final)
3. (United States) Chris Evert (semifinals)
4. (Czechoslovakia) Helena Suková (quarterfinals)
5. (United States) Pam Shriver (semifinals)
6. (Argentina) Gabriela Sabatini (quarterfinals)
7. (Bulgaria) Manuela Maleeva-Fragnière (second round)
8. (West Germany) Claudia Kohde-Kilsch (quarterfinals)
9. (West Germany) Bettina Bunge (third round)
10. (United States) Lori McNeil (second round)
11. (Sweden) Catarina Lindqvist (fourth round)
12. (Australia) Wendy Turnbull (second round)
13. (United States) Barbara Potter (second round)
14. (Bulgaria) Katerina Maleeva (first round)
15. (Italy) Raffaella Reggi (fourth round)
16. (West Germany) Sylvia Hanika (fourth round)

Click on the seed number of a player to go to their draw section.

Hana Mandlíková was originally seeded #4 but withdrew due to injury before the tournament draw was made. All original seeds from 5-16 moved up one place, and a new #16 seed was added.

== Draw ==
=== Key ===
- Q = Qualifier
- WC = Wild card
- LL = Lucky loser
- Alt = Alternate
- ITF = ITF entry
- PR = Protected ranking
- SR = Special ranking
- SE = Special exempt
- JE = Junior exempt
- JR = Junior Accelerator Programme entrant
- CO = College Accelerator Programme entrant
- NG = Next Gen Accelerator Program entrant
- w/o = Walkover
- r = Retired
- d = Defaulted

=== Finals ===
Quarterfinals
1	(United States) Martina Navratilova	6	6
(Australia) Dianne Balestrat	2	1
3	(United States) Chris Evert	6	6
8	(West Germany) Claudia Kohde-Kilsch	1	3
5	(United States) Pam Shriver	4	7	10
4	(Czechoslovakia) Helena Suková	6	6	8
6	(Argentina) Gabriela Sabatini	6	1	1
2	(West Germany) Steffi Graf	4	6	6

Semifinals
1	(United States) Martina Navratilova	6	5	6
3	(United States) Chris Evert	2	7	4
5	(United States) Pam Shriver	0	2
2	(West Germany) Steffi Graf	6	6

Final
1	(United States) Martina Navratilova	7	6
2	(West Germany) Steffi Graf	5	3

=== Top half ===
==== Section 1 ====
First round
1	(United States) M Navratilova	6	6
(West Germany) C Porwik	1	0
(United States) K Gompert	5	4
(Japan) E Inoue	7	6
(United States) C MacGregor	3	2
WC	(United Kingdom) L Gould	6	6
(United States) H Cioffi	2	1
(United States) M Louie Harper	6	6
(Spain) A Sánchez Vicario	1	6	4
Q	(New Zealand) B Cordwell	6	2	6
(Sweden) C Karlsson	4	6	3
WC	(United Kingdom) J Salmon	6	4	6
WC	(United Kingdom) J Wood	5	3
(Soviet Union) S Parkhomenko	7	6
(Puerto Rico) G Fernández	7	1	6
14	(Bulgaria) K Maleeva	6	6	4

Second round
1	(United States) M Navratilova	6	6
(Japan) E Inoue	1	2
WC	(United Kingdom) L Gould	6	2
(United States) M Louie Harper	7	6
Q	(New Zealand) B Cordwell	7	6
WC	(United Kingdom) J Salmon	6	0
(Soviet Union) S Parkhomenko	2	6	4
(Puerto Rico) G Fernández	6	3	6

Third round
1	(United States) M Navratilova	6	6
(United States) M Louie Harper	2	2
Q	(New Zealand) B Cordwell	6	1
(Puerto Rico) G Fernández	7	6

Fourth round
1	(United States) M Navratilova	6	6
(Puerto Rico) G Fernández	3	1

==== Section 2 ====
First round
13	(United States) B Potter	6	4	6
(France) C Suire	4	6	1
(United States) MJ Fernández	6	6
(United States) L Bonder	1	2
(United States) E Nagelsen	2	5
(United States) A Moulton	6	7
(Austria) J Wiesner	5	6	6
(Australia) N Provis	7	1	3
(Czechoslovakia) I Budařová	0	3
(Argentina) B Fulco	6	6
(West Germany) W Probst	2	6	0
(United Kingdom) A Hobbs	6	4	6
(Australia) D Balestrat	6	6
(Australia) J Byrne	4	1
(Canada) H Kelesi	3	2
7	(Bulgaria) M Maleeva-Fragnière	6	6

Second round
13	(United States) B Potter	0	1
(United States) MJ Fernández	6	6
(United States) A Moulton	6	6
(Austria) J Wiesner	4	4
(Argentina) B Fulco	6	6
(United Kingdom) A Hobbs	4	3
(Australia) D Balestrat	6	6	8
7	(Bulgaria) M Maleeva-Fragnière	7	1	6

Third round
(United States) MJ Fernández	7	6
(United States) A Moulton	6	2
(Argentina) B Fulco	6	0
(Australia) D Balestrat	7	6

Fourth round
(United States) MJ Fernández	5	2
(Australia) D Balestrat	7	6

==== Section 3 ====
First round
3	(United States) C Evert	6	6
(United Kingdom) S Gomer	1	0
Q	(Italy) L Golarsa	6	6
(United States) G Kim	4	1
(Argentina) P Tarabini	1	4
Q	(Japan) K Okamoto	6	6
(Canada) C Bassett	4	6	4
(Socialist Federal Republic of Yugoslavia) S Goleš	6	0	6
(Czechoslovakia) K Böhmová	1	4
(United States) P Fendick	6	6
(South Africa) R Fairbank	6	6
(United States) M Werdel	2	3
(United States) W White	6	7
Q	(Australia) M Jaggard	2	6
WC	(United Kingdom) C Wood	3	1
9	(West Germany) B Bunge	6	6

Second round
3	(United States) C Evert	7	6
Q	(Italy) L Golarsa	5	0
Q	(Japan) K Okamoto	4	6	6
(Socialist Federal Republic of Yugoslavia) S Goleš	6	3	0
(United States) P Fendick	2	7	2
(South Africa) R Fairbank	6	5	6
(United States) W White	4	4
9	(West Germany) B Bunge	6	6

Third round
3	(United States) C Evert	7	6
Q	(Japan) K Okamoto	5	0
(South Africa) R Fairbank	7	6
9	(West Germany) B Bunge	6	4

Fourth round
3	(United States) C Evert	6	2	7
(South Africa) R Fairbank	2	6	5

==== Section 4 ====
First round
11	(Sweden) C Lindqvist	6	6
(United States) K Jordan	2	2
(Soviet Union) N Bykova	5	4
(United States) C Benjamin	7	6
Q	(South Africa) K Schimper	6	2	1
(United States) A Smith	2	6	6
(United States) E Burgin	6	6
(South Africa) E Reinach	4	3
(United Kingdom) A Croft	6	6
WC	(United Kingdom) V Lake	3	1
(Brazil) N Dias	2	3
(Australia) E Smylie	6	6
(United States) M Torres	6	1
(Australia) L Field	7	6
(Belgium) A Devries	0	1
8	(West Germany) C Kohde-Kilsch	6	6

Second round
11	(Sweden) C Lindqvist	7	7
(United States) C Benjamin	5	6
(United States) A Smith	4	5
(United States) E Burgin	6	7
(United Kingdom) A Croft	3	1
(Australia) E Smylie	6	6
(Australia) L Field	6	0
8	(West Germany) C Kohde-Kilsch	7	6

Third round
11	(Sweden) C Lindqvist	6	6
(United States) E Burgin	4	1
(Australia) E Smylie	2	1
8	(West Germany) C Kohde-Kilsch	6	6

Fourth round
11	(Sweden) C Lindqvist	4	2
8	(West Germany) C Kohde-Kilsch	6	6

=== Bottom half ===
==== Section 5 ====
First round
5	(United States) P Shriver	6	6
Q	(Soviet Union) N Medvedeva	2	1
(Australia) A Minter	7	6
(United States) T Mochizuki	5	3
WC	(United Kingdom) T Catlin	1	7	3
(United States) E Herr	6	5	6
(France) P Paradis	3	5
(United States) A White	6	7
LL	(United States) A-M Fernandez	4	5
Q	(Poland) I Kuczyńska	6	7
(West Germany) S Meier	6	6
(United States) M-L Piatek	2	2
(United States) G Magers	6	4	4
(Soviet Union) L Savchenko	3	6	6
(South Africa) D van Rensburg	5	2
16	(West Germany) S Hanika	7	6

Second round
5	(United States) P Shriver	6	6
(Australia) A Minter	2	2
(United States) E Herr	6	6
(United States) A White	1	4
Q	(Poland) I Kuczyńska	6	6
(West Germany) S Meier	3	3
(Soviet Union) L Savchenko	3	3
16	(West Germany) S Hanika	6	6

Third round
5	(United States) P Shriver	6	6
(United States) E Herr	2	2
Q	(Poland) I Kuczyńska	3	4
16	(West Germany) S Hanika	6	6

Fourth round
5	(United States) P Shriver	6	7	10
16	(West Germany) S Hanika	7	5	8

==== Section 6 ====
First round
15	(Italy) R Reggi	6	6
(United States) B Bowes	4	2
(United States) S Sloane	6	2	6
(United States) P Casale	4	6	2
(Czechoslovakia) R Maršíková	6	6
(United States) T Phelps	4	3
(United States) V Nelson-Dunbar	1	5
(France) C Tanvier	6	7
(Australia) E Minter	1	1
(Netherlands) M Mesker	6	6
(United States) M Van Nostrand	2	0
(United Kingdom) J Durie	6	6
(United States) R White	6	6
WC	(United Kingdom) A Grunfeld	1	3
WC	(United Kingdom) J Louis	1	4
4	(Czechoslovakia) H Suková	6	6

Second round
15	(Italy) R Reggi	6	6
(United States) S Sloane	2	2
(Czechoslovakia) R Maršíková	0	2
(France) C Tanvier	6	6
(Netherlands) M Mesker	3	3
(United Kingdom) J Durie	6	6
(United States) R White	2	6	3
4	(Czechoslovakia) H Suková	6	3	6

Third round
15	(Italy) R Reggi	6	6
(France) C Tanvier	3	4
(United Kingdom) J Durie	1	3
4	(Czechoslovakia) H Suková	6	6

Fourth round
15	(Italy) R Reggi	0	0
4	(Czechoslovakia) H Suková	6	6

==== Section 7 ====
First round
6	(Argentina) G Sabatini	6	6
(United States) B Gerken	3	3
(United States) K Horvath	4	5
(Switzerland) C Bartos-Cserepy	6	7
Q	(Brazil) G Miró	3	1
(France) I Demongeot	6	6
(United States) T Holladay	6	3	4
(Italy) L Garrone	3	6	6
(United States) K Keil	2	1
(United States) A Henricksson	6	6
(France) N Tauziat	2	6	6
(Austria) B Paulus	6	1	1
(Soviet Union) N Zvereva	6	6
(United States) H Ludloff	2	4
(France) M-C Calleja	2	3
10	(United States) L McNeil	6	6

Second round
6	(Argentina) G Sabatini	6	6
(Switzerland) C Bartos-Cserepy	1	3
(France) I Demongeot	3	6	8
(Italy) L Garrone	6	2	6
(United States) A Henricksson	6	6
(France) N Tauziat	4	4
(Soviet Union) N Zvereva	6	6
10	(United States) L McNeil	4	4

Third round
6	(Argentina) G Sabatini	6	6
(France) I Demongeot	3	4
(United States) A Henricksson	3	3
(Soviet Union) N Zvereva	6	6

Fourth round
6	(Argentina) G Sabatini	6	2	6
(Soviet Union) N Zvereva	0	6	4

==== Section 8 ====
First round
12	(Australia) W Turnbull	6	6
(United States) D Spence	4	2
(France) N Herreman	3	6	4
(United States) S Walsh-Pete	6	3	6
(United States) R Reis	3	6	6
(Czechoslovakia) J Novotná	6	3	8
(West Germany) E Pfaff	2	3
(United States) N Hu	6	6
(Argentina) M Paz	5	6	3
(Peru) L Gildemeister	7	4	6
(Hong Kong) P Hy	4	5
(Japan) A Kijimuta	6	7
(Denmark) T Scheuer-Larsen	6	6
(Netherlands) N Jagerman	2	0
(Argentina) A Villagrán	0	2
2	(West Germany) S Graf	6	6

Second round
12	(Australia) W Turnbull	4	4
(United States) S Walsh-Pete	6	6
(Czechoslovakia) J Novotná	6	6
(United States) N Hu	2	3
(Peru) L Gildemeister	6	6
(Japan) A Kijimuta	2	4
(Denmark) T Scheuer-Larsen	0	0
2	(West Germany) S Graf	6	6

Third round
(United States) S Walsh-Pete	2	6	4
(Czechoslovakia) J Novotná	6	4	6
(Peru) L Gildemeister	2	1
2	(West Germany) S Graf	6	6

Fourth round
(Czechoslovakia) J Novotná	4	3
2	(West Germany) S Graf	6	6

== See also ==
- Evert–Navratilova rivalry

Preceded by 1987 French Open – Women's singles	Grand Slam women's singles	Succeeded by 1987 US Open – Women's singles
