= 1987 Wimbledon Championships – Women's doubles =

Women's doubles
- 1987 Wimbledon Championships

Final
- Champions: (West Germany) Claudia Kohde-Kilsch (Czechoslovakia) Helena Suková
- Runners-up: (United States) Betsy Nagelsen (Australia) Elizabeth Smylie
- Score: 7–5, 7–5

Details
- Draw: 64 (4Q / 5WC)
- Seeds: 16

Events
Singles	men	women		boys	girls
Doubles	men	women	mixed	boys	girls
WC Singles	men	women	quad
WC Doubles	men	women	quad
Legends	men	women	seniors
- Wimbledon Championships

Martina Navratilova and Pam Shriver were the defending champions, but lost in the quarterfinals to Svetlana Parkhomenko and Larisa Savchenko. This loss ended Navratilova’s record streak of 16-consecutive grand slam doubles finals made, dating back to the 1983 Wimbledon doubles, all of which were with Shriver, except the 1986 French Open doubles. Navratilova would claim nearly half, 14, of her career record 31 grand slam doubles championships during the aforementioned streak.

Claudia Kohde-Kilsch and Helena Suková defeated Betsy Nagelsen and Elizabeth Smylie in the final, 7-5, 7-5 to win the ladies' doubles tennis title at the 1987 Wimbledon Championships.

== Seeds ==
1. (United States) Martina Navratilova / (United States) Pam Shriver (quarterfinals)
2. (West Germany) Steffi Graf / (Argentina) Gabriela Sabatini (third round)
3. (West Germany) Claudia Kohde-Kilsch / (Czechoslovakia) Helena Suková (champions)
4. (United States) Elise Burgin / (South Africa) Rosalyn Fairbank (quarterfinals)
5. (United States) Betsy Nagelsen / (Australia) Elizabeth Smylie (final)
6. (Soviet Union) Svetlana Parkhomenko / (Soviet Union) Larisa Savchenko (semifinals)
7. (United States) Lori McNeil / (United States) Robin White (semifinals)
8. (West Germany) Bettina Bunge / (Puerto Rico) Gigi Fernández (third round)
9. (United States) Kathy Jordan / (United States) Anne Smith (quarterfinals)
10. (Argentina) Mercedes Paz / (West Germany) Eva Pfaff (first round)
11. (United Kingdom) Anne Hobbs / (United States) Candy Reynolds (third round)
12. (United States) Mary-Lou Piatek / (United States) Anne White (second round)
13. (Australia) Jenny Byrne / (United States) Patty Fendick (second round)
14. (Sweden) Catarina Lindqvist / (Denmark) Tine Scheuer-Larsen (first round)
15. (United States) Beth Herr / (United States) Alycia Moulton (second round)
16. (United Kingdom) Jo Durie / (France) Catherine Tanvier (first round)

Click on the seed number of a player to go to their draw section.

== Draw ==
Key

- Q = Qualifier
- WC = Wild card
- LL = Lucky loser
- Alt = Alternate
- ITF = ITF entry
- PR = Protected ranking
- SR = Special ranking
- SE = Special exempt
- JE = Junior exempt
- JR = Junior Accelerator Programme entrant
- CO = College Accelerator Programme entrant
- NG = Next Gen Accelerator Program entrant
- w/o = Walkover
- r = Retired
- d = Defaulted

=== Finals ===
Quarterfinals
1	(United States) Martina Navratilova (United States) Pam Shriver	2	4
6	(Soviet Union) Svetlana Parkhomenko (Soviet Union) Larisa Savchenko	6	6
3	(West Germany) Claudia Kohde-Kilsch (Czechoslovakia) Helena Suková	7	7
9	(United States) Kathy Jordan (United States) Anne Smith	6	5
5	(United States) Betsy Nagelsen (Australia) Elizabeth Smylie	7	6	6
4	(United States) Elise Burgin (South Africa) Rosalyn Fairbank	6	7	3
7	(United States) Lori McNeil (United States) Robin White	6	6
(United States) Anna-Maria Fernandez (New Zealand) Julie Richardson	3	3

Semifinals
6	(Soviet Union) Svetlana Parkhomenko (Soviet Union) Larisa Savchenko	6	4	5
3	(West Germany) Claudia Kohde-Kilsch (Czechoslovakia) Helena Suková	1	6	7
5	(United States) Betsy Nagelsen (Australia) Elizabeth Smylie	6	6	6
7	(United States) Lori McNeil (United States) Robin White	4	7	4

Final
3	(West Germany) Claudia Kohde-Kilsch (Czechoslovakia) Helena Suková	7	7
5	(United States) Betsy Nagelsen (Australia) Elizabeth Smylie	5	5

=== Top half ===
==== Section 1 ====
First round
1	(United States) M Navratilova (United States) P Shriver	6	6
(Hong Kong) P Hy (Japan) E Inoue	1	1
(United States) L Antonoplis (Brazil) C Monteiro	1	6	4
(Czechoslovakia) J Novotná (France) C Suire	6	3	6
LL	(South Africa) K Schimper (Japan) M Yanagi	2	3
WC	(New Zealand) B Cordwell (Australia) A Minter	6	6
(Bulgaria) K Maleeva (Bulgaria) M Maleeva	7	3	3
15	(United States) E Herr (United States) A Moulton	6	6	6
11	(United Kingdom) A Hobbs (United States) C Reynolds	6	6
(United States) P Casale (Switzerland) L Drescher	1	2
(South Africa) E Reinach (South Africa) M Reinach	6	6
(Argentina) B Fulco (Argentina) G Mosca	0	2
(United States) M Louie Harper (United States) H Ludloff	6	6
Q	(Japan) K Okamoto (Japan) N Sato	4	3
WC	(United Kingdom) V Lake (United Kingdom) C Wood	2	0
6	(Soviet Union) S Parkhomenko (Soviet Union) L Savchenko	6	6

Second round
1	(United States) M Navratilova (United States) P Shriver	5	6	6
(Czechoslovakia) J Novotná (France) C Suire	7	4	4
WC	(New Zealand) B Cordwell (Australia) A Minter	6	6
15	(United States) E Herr (United States) A Moulton	4	4
11	(United Kingdom) A Hobbs (United States) C Reynolds	5	6	6
(South Africa) E Reinach (South Africa) M Reinach	7	4	1
(United States) M Louie Harper (United States) H Ludloff	0	6
6	(Soviet Union) S Parkhomenko (Soviet Union) L Savchenko	6	7

Third round
1	(United States) M Navratilova (United States) P Shriver	6	6
WC	(New Zealand) B Cordwell (Australia) A Minter	4	2
11	(United Kingdom) A Hobbs (United States) C Reynolds	0	3
6	(Soviet Union) S Parkhomenko (Soviet Union) L Savchenko	6	6

Quarterfinals
1	(United States) M Navratilova (United States) P Shriver	2	4
6	(Soviet Union) S Parkhomenko (Soviet Union) L Savchenko	6	6

==== Section 2 ====
First round
3	(West Germany) C Kohde-Kilsch (Czechoslovakia) H Suková	6	6
(United States) D-A Hansel (United States) J Kaplan	3	4
(United States) G Magers (United States) W White	6	6
Q	(United Kingdom) M Javer (United States) N Sodupe	1	0
(United States) A Henricksson (United States) M Van Nostrand	6	6
(Sweden) C Karlsson (Italy) R Reggi	4	2
WC	(United Kingdom) S Gomer (Australia) M Jaggard	2	2
13	(Australia) J Byrne (United States) P Fendick	6	6
9	(United States) K Jordan (United States) A Smith	7	6
(Czechoslovakia) K Böhmová (Poland) I Kuczyńska	6	4
(West Germany) A Betzner (West Germany) S Singer	6	7	4
(United States) P Smith (South Africa) D van Rensburg	7	6	6
(United States) Ca MacGregor (United States) Cy MacGregor	6	6
(United States) B Gerken (United States) S Mascarin	4	3
WC	(United Kingdom) C Billingham (United Kingdom) K Hunter	0	1
8	(West Germany) B Bunge (Puerto Rico) G Fernández	6	6

Second round
3	(West Germany) C Kohde-Kilsch (Czechoslovakia) H Suková	6	6
(United States) G Magers (United States) W White	3	2
(United States) A Henricksson (United States) M Van Nostrand	5	6	9
13	(Australia) J Byrne (United States) P Fendick	7	1	7
9	(United States) K Jordan (United States) A Smith	6	6
(United States) P Smith (South Africa) D van Rensburg	4	4
(United States) Ca MacGregor (United States) Cy MacGregor	2	7	3
8	(West Germany) B Bunge (Puerto Rico) G Fernández	6	6	6

Third round
3	(West Germany) C Kohde-Kilsch (Czechoslovakia) H Suková	6	6
(United States) A Henricksson (United States) M Van Nostrand	3	4
9	(United States) K Jordan (United States) A Smith	7	6
8	(West Germany) B Bunge (Puerto Rico) G Fernández	5	3

Quarterfinals
3	(West Germany) C Kohde-Kilsch (Czechoslovakia) H Suková	7	7
9	(United States) K Jordan (United States) A Smith	6	5

=== Bottom half ===
==== Section 3 ====
First round
5	(United States) E Nagelsen (Australia) E Smylie	7	7
(United States) MJ Fernández (United States) M Werdel	5	6
Q	(Soviet Union) L Meskhi (Soviet Union) N Zvereva	5	1
Q	(Netherlands) M Bollegraf (Sweden) M Lindström	7	6
(United States) N Hu (France) P Paradis	4	4
(Canada) J Hetherington (United States) J Russell	6	6
(Czechoslovakia) I Budařová (Argentina) A Villagrán	1	2
12	(United States) M-L Piatek (United States) A White	6	6
16	(United Kingdom) J Durie (France) C Tanvier	5	4
(Brazil) N Dias (Argentina) P Tarabini	7	6
(Canada) C Bassett (Canada) H Kelesi	4	7	6
(Australia) D Balestrat (United States) T Phelps	6	5	4
(Switzerland) C Bartos-Cserépy (Australia) N Provis	6	7	6
WC	(United Kingdom) B Borneo (United Kingdom) J Salmon	7	6	4
(West Germany) W Probst (Spain) A Sánchez Vicario	2	2
4	(United States) E Burgin (South Africa) R Fairbank	6	6

Second round
5	(United States) E Nagelsen (Australia) E Smylie	4	6	6
Q	(Netherlands) M Bollegraf (Sweden) M Lindström	6	3	4
(Canada) J Hetherington (United States) J Russell	7	7
12	(United States) M-L Piatek (United States) A White	5	6
(Brazil) N Dias (Argentina) P Tarabini	7	7
(Canada) C Bassett (Canada) H Kelesi	6	6
(Switzerland) C Bartos-Cserépy (Australia) N Provis	5	3
4	(United States) E Burgin (South Africa) R Fairbank	7	6

Third round
5	(United States) E Nagelsen (Australia) E Smylie	4	6	6
(Canada) J Hetherington (United States) J Russell	6	4	2
(Brazil) N Dias (Argentina) P Tarabini	3	2
4	(United States) E Burgin (South Africa) R Fairbank	6	6

Quarterfinals
5	(United States) E Nagelsen (Australia) E Smylie	7	6	6
4	(United States) E Burgin (South Africa) R Fairbank	6	7	3

==== Section 4 ====
First round
7	(United States) L McNeil (United States) R White	6	6
(United States) L Allen (United States) C Benjamin	1	3
(United States) P Barg (Peru) L Gildemeister	6	6
(Australia) S Leo (Australia) L O'Neill	3	3
(West Germany) S Meier (West Germany) C Porwik	6	4	3
(United States) H Crowe (United States) K Steinmetz	4	6	6
(Australia) L Field (Australia) E Minter	7	3	6
14	(Sweden) C Lindqvist (Denmark) T Scheuer-Larsen	5	6	2
10	(Argentina) M Paz (West Germany) E Pfaff	6	6	3
(United States) A-M Fernandez (New Zealand) J Richardson	7	4	6
(France) I Demongeot (France) N Tauziat	6	6
(Netherlands) N Jagerman (Netherlands) M van der Torre	1	1
(United States) K Horvath (Netherlands) M Mesker	4	2
(United States) S Collins (United States) S Walsh-Pete	6	6
(United Kingdom) A Croft (Czechoslovakia) R Maršíková	4	2
2	(West Germany) S Graf (Argentina) G Sabatini	6	6

Second round
7	(United States) L McNeil (United States) R White	6	6
(United States) P Barg (Peru) L Gildemeister	2	4
(United States) H Crowe (United States) K Steinmetz	2	4
(Australia) L Field (Australia) E Minter	6	6
(United States) A-M Fernandez (New Zealand) J Richardson	6	6
(France) I Demongeot (France) N Tauziat	4	2
(United States) S Collins (United States) S Walsh-Pete	5	4
2	(West Germany) S Graf (Argentina) G Sabatini	7	6

Third round
7	(United States) L McNeil (United States) R White	2	6	6
(Australia) L Field (Australia) E Minter	6	2	2
(United States) A-M Fernandez (New Zealand) J Richardson	4	6	6
2	(West Germany) S Graf (Argentina) G Sabatini	6	2	4

Quarterfinals
7	(United States) L McNeil (United States) R White	6	6
(United States) A-M Fernandez (New Zealand) J Richardson	3	3
