= 1987 Wimbledon Championships =

- Date: 22 June – 5 July
- Edition: 101st
- Category: Grand Slam
- Draw: 128S/64D/64XD
- Prize money: £2,119,780
- Surface: Grass
- Location: Church Road; SW19, Wimbledon, London, United Kingdom
- Venue: All England Lawn Tennis and Croquet Club

Champions

Men's singles
- (Australia) Pat Cash

Women's singles
- (United States) Martina Navratilova

Men's doubles
- (United States) Ken Flach / (United States) Robert Seguso

Women's doubles
- (West Germany) Claudia Kohde-Kilsch / (Czechoslovakia) Helena Suková

Mixed doubles
- (United Kingdom) Jeremy Bates / (United Kingdom) Jo Durie

Boys' singles
- (Italy) Diego Nargiso

Girls' singles
- (Soviet Union) Natasha Zvereva

Boys' doubles
- (Australia) Jason Stoltenberg / (Australia) Todd Woodbridge

Girls' doubles
- (Soviet Union) Natalia Medvedeva / (Soviet Union) Natasha Zvereva
- Wimbledon Championships

The 1987 Wimbledon Championships was a tennis tournament played on grass courts at the All England Lawn Tennis and Croquet Club in Wimbledon, London in the United Kingdom. It was the 101st edition of the Wimbledon Championships and were held from 22 June to 5 July 1987.

== Prize money ==
The total prize money for 1987 championships was £2,119,780. The winner of the men's title earned £155,000 while the women's singles champion earned £139,500.

Event	W	F	SF	QF	Round of 16	Round of 32	Round of 64	Round of 128
Men's singles	£155,000	£77,500	£38,750	£19,635	£10,335	£5,785	£3,410	£2,080
Women's singles	£139,500	£69,750	£33,900	£16,690	£8,270	£4,485	£2,645	£1,610
Men's doubles *	£53,730	£26,870	£13,430	£6,820	£3,510	£1,860	£1,090	—N/a
Women's doubles *	£46,500	£23,250	£10,740	£5,460	£2,630	£1,400	£800	—N/a
Mixed doubles *	£27,900	£13,950	£6,980	£3,240	£1,620	£810	£370	—N/a

_{* per team}

== Champions ==
=== Seniors ===
==== Men's singles ====
(Australia) Pat Cash defeated (Czechoslovakia) Ivan Lendl, 7–6^{(7–5)}, 6–2, 7–5

- It was Cash's only career Grand Slam title.

==== Women's singles ====
(United States) Martina Navratilova defeated (West Germany) Steffi Graf, 7–5, 6–3

- It was Navratilova's 45th career Grand Slam title and her 8th Wimbledon title.

==== Men's doubles ====
(United States) Ken Flach / (United States) Robert Seguso defeated (Spain) Sergio Casal / (Spain) Emilio Sánchez, 3–6, 6–7^{(6–8)}, 7–6^{(7–3)}, 6–1, 6–4

- It was Flach's 4th career Grand Slam title and his 2nd Wimbledon title. It was Seguso's 3rd career Grand Slam title and his 1st Wimbledon title.

==== Women's doubles ====
(West Germany) Claudia Kohde-Kilsch / (Czechoslovakia) Helena Suková defeated (United States) Betsy Nagelsen / (Australia) Elizabeth Smylie, 7–5, 7–5

- It was Kohde-Kilsch's 2nd and last career Grand Slam title and her only Wimbledon title. It was Suková's 2nd career Grand Slam title and her 1st Wimbledon title.

==== Mixed doubles ====
(United Kingdom) Jeremy Bates / (United Kingdom) Jo Durie defeated (Australia) Darren Cahill / (Australia) Nicole Provis, 7–6^{(12–10)}, 6–3

- It was Bates' 1st career Grand Slam title and his only Wimbledon title. It was Durie's 1st career Grand Slam title and her only Wimbledon title.

=== Juniors ===
==== Boys' singles ====
(Italy) Diego Nargiso defeated (Australia) Jason Stoltenberg, 7–6^{(8–6)}, 6–4

==== Girls' singles ====
(Soviet Union) Natasha Zvereva defeated (France) Julie Halard, 6–4, 6–4

==== Boys' doubles ====
(Australia) Jason Stoltenberg / (Australia) Todd Woodbridge defeated (Italy) Diego Nargiso / (Italy) Eugenio Rossi, 6–3, 7–6^{(7–2)}

==== Girls' doubles ====
(Soviet Union) Natalia Medvedeva / (Soviet Union) Natasha Zvereva defeated (South Korea) Kim Il-soon / (Hong Kong) Paulette Moreno, 6–2, 5–7, 6–0

== Singles seeds ==
=== Men's singles ===
1. (West Germany) Boris Becker (second round, lost to Peter Doohan)
2. (Czechoslovakia) Ivan Lendl (final, lost to Pat Cash)
3. (Sweden) Mats Wilander (quarterfinals, lost to Pat Cash)
4. (Sweden) Stefan Edberg (semifinals, lost to Ivan Lendl)
5. (Czechoslovakia) Miloslav Mečíř (third round, lost to Anders Järryd)
6. (France) Yannick Noah (second round, lost to Guy Forget)
7. (United States) Jimmy Connors (semifinals, lost to Pat Cash)
8. (Ecuador) Andrés Gómez (fourth round, lost to Henri Leconte)
9. (France) Henri Leconte (quarterfinals, lost to Ivan Lendl)
10. (United States) Tim Mayotte (third round, lost to Mikael Pernfors)
11. (Australia) Pat Cash (champion)
12. (United States) Brad Gilbert (third round, lost to Alexander Volkov)
13. (Sweden) Joakim Nyström (third round, lost to Jakob Hlasek)
14. (Spain) Emilio Sánchez (fourth round, lost to Mats Wilander)
15. (United States) David Pate (second round, lost to Slobodan Živojinović)
16. (United States) Kevin Curren (second round, lost to Johan Kriek)

=== Women's singles ===
1. (United States) Martina Navratilova (champion)
2. (West Germany) Steffi Graf (final, lost to Martina Navratilova)
3. (United States) Chris Evert (semifinals, lost to Martina Navratilova)
4. (Czechoslovakia) Helena Suková (quarterfinals, lost to Pam Shriver)
5. (United States) Pam Shriver (semifinals, lost to Steffi Graf)
6. (Argentina) Gabriela Sabatini (Quarterfinals, lost to Steffi Graf)
7. (Bulgaria) Manuela Maleeva-Fragnière (second round, lost to Dianne Balestrat)
8. (West Germany) Claudia Kohde-Kilsch (quarterfinals, lost to Chris Evert)
9. (West Germany) Bettina Bunge (third round, lost to Rosalyn Fairbank)
10. (United States) Lori McNeil (second round, lost to Natasha Zvereva)
11. (Sweden) Catarina Lindqvist (fourth round, lost to Claudia Kohde-Kilsch)
12. (Australia) Wendy Turnbull (second round, lost to Sharon Walsh-Pete)
13. (United States) Barbara Potter (second round, lost to Mary Joe Fernández)
14. (Bulgaria) Katerina Maleeva (first round, lost to Gigi Fernández)
15. (Italy) Raffaella Reggi (fourth round, lost to Helena Suková)
16. (West Germany) Sylvia Hanika (fourth round, lost to Pam Shriver)

Preceded by 1987 French Open	Grand Slams	Succeeded by 1987 US Open
