= 1988 ATP Challenger Series =

Second tier tour for professional tennis

Details
- Duration: 11 January 1988 – 18 December 1988
- Edition: 11th
- Tournaments: 91

Achievements (singles)

The ATP Challenger Series was the second-tier tour for professional tennis organised by the Association of Tennis Professionals (ATP). The 1988 ATP Challenger Series calendar comprised 91 tournaments, with prize money ranging from $25,000 up to $75,000.

== Schedule ==
=== January ===
Week of	Tournament	Champions	Runners-up	Semifinalists	Quarterfinalists
January 4	No tournaments scheduled.				
January 11	Intersport Heilbronn Open; Heilbronn, West Germany $25,000 – carpet (I) – 32S/16D; Singles draw – Doubles draw	(West Germany) Udo Riglewski; 6–3, 6–7, 6–4	(West Germany) Michael Kupferschmid	(Socialist Federal Republic of Yugoslavia) Damir Buljević (Romania) Adrian Marcu	(Sweden) Ronnie Båthman (Czechoslovakia) Stanislav Birner (Sweden) Fredrik Waern (Denmark) Morten Christensen
January 11	Intersport Heilbronn Open; Heilbronn, West Germany $25,000 – carpet (I) – 32S/16D; Singles draw – Doubles draw	(West Germany) Jaromir Becka (West Germany) Udo Riglewski; 7–6, 4–6, 6–2	(West Germany) Axel Hornung (West Germany) Andreas Lesch	(Socialist Federal Republic of Yugoslavia) Damir Buljević (Romania) Adrian Marcu	(Sweden) Ronnie Båthman (Czechoslovakia) Stanislav Birner (Sweden) Fredrik Waern (Denmark) Morten Christensen
January 18	Viña del Mar Challenger; Viña del Mar, Chile $25,000 – clay – 32S/16D; Singles draw – Doubles draw	(United States) Jim Courier; 6–1, 6–1	(United States) Lawson Duncan	(Ecuador) Raúl Viver (Chile) Ricardo Acuña	(Chile) Rubén Gajardo (Brazil) Ivan Kley (Chile) Juan Pablo Queirolo (Argentina) Alberto Mancini
January 18	Viña del Mar Challenger; Viña del Mar, Chile $25,000 – clay – 32S/16D; Singles draw – Doubles draw	(Chile) Ricardo Acuña (United States) Luke Jensen; 6–1, 6-4	(Argentina) Pablo Albano (Argentina) Fabián Blengino	(Ecuador) Raúl Viver (Chile) Ricardo Acuña	(Chile) Rubén Gajardo (Brazil) Ivan Kley (Chile) Juan Pablo Queirolo (Argentina) Alberto Mancini
January 25	No tournaments scheduled.				

=== February ===
Week of	Tournament	Champions	Runners-up	Semifinalists	Quarterfinalists
February 1	No tournaments scheduled.				
February 8	No tournaments scheduled.				
February 15	No tournaments scheduled.				
February 22	Nairobi Challenger; Nairobi, Kenya $25,000 – clay – 32S/16D; Singles draw – Doubles draw	(Kenya) Paul Wekesa; 7–6, 3–6, 6–3	(Portugal) João Cunha e Silva	(Mexico) Agustín Moreno (Italy) Paolo Pambianco	(Austria) Bernhard Pils (Austria) Stefan Lochbihler (West Germany) Daniel Deboer (Italy) Giovanni Lelli Mami
February 22	Nairobi Challenger; Nairobi, Kenya $25,000 – clay – 32S/16D; Singles draw – Doubles draw	(United States) Bud Cox (Switzerland) Stephan Medem; 7–6, 4–6, 6–4	(Italy) Ugo Colombini (Mexico) Agustín Moreno	(Mexico) Agustín Moreno (Italy) Paolo Pambianco	(Austria) Bernhard Pils (Austria) Stefan Lochbihler (West Germany) Daniel Deboer (Italy) Giovanni Lelli Mami
February 22	Vienna Challenger; Vienna, Austria $25,000 – carpet (I) – 32S/16D; Singles draw – Doubles draw	(Italy) Omar Camporese; 7–6, 2–6, 6–2	(Poland) Wojciech Kowalski	(Italy) Nevio Devide (United States) Brett Dickinson	(Italy) Gianluca Pozzi (United States) Richard Matuszewski (Mexico) Leonardo Lavalle (Italy) Alessandro de Minicis
February 22	Vienna Challenger; Vienna, Austria $25,000 – carpet (I) – 32S/16D; Singles draw – Doubles draw	(United States) Mark Basham (United States) Charles Beckman; 6–3, 3–6, 6–3	(Austria) Thomas Muster (Austria) Michael Oberleitner	(Italy) Nevio Devide (United States) Brett Dickinson	(Italy) Gianluca Pozzi (United States) Richard Matuszewski (Mexico) Leonardo Lavalle (Italy) Alessandro de Minicis
February 29	No tournaments scheduled.				

=== March ===
Week of	Tournament	Champions	Runners-up	Semifinalists	Quarterfinalists
March 7	Palm Hills International Tennis Challenger; Cairo, Egypt $75,000 – clay – 32S/16D; Singles draw – Doubles draw	(Spain) Jordi Arrese; 7–6, 6–2	(Peru) Carlos di Laura	(Spain) Fernando Luna (Spain) Eduardo Osta	(Spain) Jorge Bardou (Argentina) Roberto Argüello (Spain) Juan Aguilera (Czechoslovakia) Josef Čihák
March 7	Palm Hills International Tennis Challenger; Cairo, Egypt $75,000 – clay – 32S/16D; Singles draw – Doubles draw	(Czechoslovakia) Josef Čihák (Czechoslovakia) Cyril Suk; 6–3, 6-2	(Argentina) Roberto Argüello (Argentina) Marcelo Ingaramo	(Spain) Fernando Luna (Spain) Eduardo Osta	(Spain) Jorge Bardou (Argentina) Roberto Argüello (Spain) Juan Aguilera (Czechoslovakia) Josef Čihák
March 7	Madeira-1 Challenger; Madeira, Portugal $75,000 – hard – 32S/16D; Singles draw – Doubles draw	(Spain) Javier Sánchez; 6–1, 6–1	(New Zealand) David Lewis	(Portugal) Nuno Marques (Nigeria) Nduka Odizor	(Portugal) João Cunha e Silva (Peru) Pablo Arraya (West Germany) Michael Westphal (Senegal) Yahiya Doumbia
March 7	Madeira-1 Challenger; Madeira, Portugal $75,000 – hard – 32S/16D; Singles draw – Doubles draw	(United Kingdom) David Felgate (United Kingdom) Nick Fulwood; 7–5, 7-5	(United States) Jon Levine (Nigeria) Nduka Odizor	(Portugal) Nuno Marques (Nigeria) Nduka Odizor	(Portugal) João Cunha e Silva (Peru) Pablo Arraya (West Germany) Michael Westphal (Senegal) Yahiya Doumbia
March 14	Marrakech Challenger; Marrakesh, Morocco $75,000 – clay – 32S/16D; Singles draw – Doubles draw	(Argentina) Franco Davín; 6–3, 2–6, 6–4	(Spain) Jordi Arrese	(Italy) Alessandro Baldoni (Chile) Pedro Rebolledo	(Spain) Tomás Carbonell (Italy) Claudio Pistolesi (Italy) Massimiliano Narducci (France) Jean-Philippe Fleurian
March 14	Marrakech Challenger; Marrakesh, Morocco $75,000 – clay – 32S/16D; Singles draw – Doubles draw	(Sweden) Christer Allgårdh (Sweden) Conny Falk; 6–3, 6-2	(United States) Lawson Duncan (West Germany) Hans Schwaier	(Italy) Alessandro Baldoni (Chile) Pedro Rebolledo	(Spain) Tomás Carbonell (Italy) Claudio Pistolesi (Italy) Massimiliano Narducci (France) Jean-Philippe Fleurian
March 21	Agadir Challenger; Agadir, Morocco $75,000 – clay – 32S/16D; Singles draw – Doubles draw	(Spain) Jordi Arrese; 1–6, 6–3, 7–6	(Argentina) Franco Davín	(Haiti) Ronald Agénor (Italy) Claudio Pistolesi	(Spain) Juan Avendaño (Spain) Alberto Tous (West Germany) Markus Rackl (Czechoslovakia) Josef Čihák
March 21	Agadir Challenger; Agadir, Morocco $75,000 – clay – 32S/16D; Singles draw – Doubles draw	(Czechoslovakia) Josef Čihák (Czechoslovakia) Cyril Suk; 6–2, 6-2	(Spain) José López-Maeso (Spain) Alberto Tous	(Haiti) Ronald Agénor (Italy) Claudio Pistolesi	(Spain) Juan Avendaño (Spain) Alberto Tous (West Germany) Markus Rackl (Czechoslovakia) Josef Čihák
March 21	Martinique Challenger; Martinique, French West Indies $50,000 – hard – 32S/16D; Singles draw – Doubles draw	(West Germany) Patrick Baur; 6–4, 7–5	(Netherlands) Tom Nijssen	(Uruguay) Diego Pérez (United States) Bill Scanlon	(West Germany) Christian Saceanu (Chile) Ricardo Acuña (United Kingdom) Andrew Castle (United States) Todd Nelson
March 21	Martinique Challenger; Martinique, French West Indies $50,000 – hard – 32S/16D; Singles draw – Doubles draw	(South Africa) Pieter Aldrich (Italy) Diego Nargiso; 7–5, 4–6, 6–4	(United States) Todd Nelson (The Bahamas) Roger Smith	(Uruguay) Diego Pérez (United States) Bill Scanlon	(West Germany) Christian Saceanu (Chile) Ricardo Acuña (United Kingdom) Andrew Castle (United States) Todd Nelson
March 21	São Paulo-1 Challenger; São Paulo, Brazil $25,000 – hard – 32S/16D; Singles draw – Doubles draw	(Argentina) Alberto Mancini; 4–6, 6–3, 6–4	(Brazil) Fernando Roese	(Brazil) Ivan Kley (Brazil) Jaime Oncins	(Ecuador) Raúl Viver (Chile) Robinson Ureta (Brazil) Marcos Hocevar (Portugal) Nuno Marques
March 21	São Paulo-1 Challenger; São Paulo, Brazil $25,000 – hard – 32S/16D; Singles draw – Doubles draw	(Argentina) Pablo Albano (Brazil) Dácio Campos; 7–5, 6-4	(Argentina) Gustavo Luza (Argentina) Alberto Mancini	(Brazil) Ivan Kley (Brazil) Jaime Oncins	(Ecuador) Raúl Viver (Chile) Robinson Ureta (Brazil) Marcos Hocevar (Portugal) Nuno Marques
March 28	S Tennis Masters Challenger; Graz, Austria $50,000 – hard (I) – 32S/16D; Singles draw – Doubles draw	(Austria) Alex Antonitsch; 6–3, 6–4	(Austria) Thomas Muster	(United States) Leif Shiras (Australia) Carl Limberger	(Czechoslovakia) Stanislav Birner (Italy) Claudio Panatta (Socialist Federal Republic of Yugoslavia) Goran Ivanišević (West Germany) Hans-Dieter Beutel
March 28	S Tennis Masters Challenger; Graz, Austria $50,000 – hard (I) – 32S/16D; Singles draw – Doubles draw	(South Africa) Denys Maasdorp (West Germany) Torben Theine; 6–4, 6-4	(Czechoslovakia) Stanislav Birner (Italy) Alessandro de Minicis	(United States) Leif Shiras (Australia) Carl Limberger	(Czechoslovakia) Stanislav Birner (Italy) Claudio Panatta (Socialist Federal Republic of Yugoslavia) Goran Ivanišević (West Germany) Hans-Dieter Beutel
March 28	Guadeloupe Challenger; Guadeloupe, French West Indies $25,000 – hard – 32S/16D; Singles draw – Doubles draw	(South Africa) Pieter Aldrich; 7–5, 7–6	(Kenya) Paul Wekesa	(France) Éric Winogradsky (West Germany) Michael Westphal	(France) Arnaud Boetsch (Canada) Glenn Michibata (The Bahamas) Roger Smith (United States) Dan Cassidy
March 28	Guadeloupe Challenger; Guadeloupe, French West Indies $25,000 – hard – 32S/16D; Singles draw – Doubles draw	(United States) David Dowlen (United States) Marcel Freeman; 6–3, 6-3	(Australia) Russell Barlow (United States) Jonathan Canter	(France) Éric Winogradsky (West Germany) Michael Westphal	(France) Arnaud Boetsch (Canada) Glenn Michibata (The Bahamas) Roger Smith (United States) Dan Cassidy
March 28	San Luis Potosí Challenger; San Luis Potosí, Mexico $25,000 – clay – 32S/16D; Singles draw – Doubles draw	(Australia) Peter Doohan; 6–4, 6–4	(Mexico) Agustín Moreno	(Argentina) Roberto Saad (Mexico) Leonardo Lavalle	(Puerto Rico) Miguel Nido (United States) John Letts (United States) Jim Gurfein (Mexico) Gilberto Cicero
March 28	San Luis Potosí Challenger; San Luis Potosí, Mexico $25,000 – clay – 32S/16D; Singles draw – Doubles draw	(Mexico) Luis Herrera (Mexico) Javier Ordaz; 4–6, 7–6, 6–4	(Mexico) Agustín Moreno (Mexico) Fernando Pérez Pascal	(Argentina) Roberto Saad (Mexico) Leonardo Lavalle	(Puerto Rico) Miguel Nido (United States) John Letts (United States) Jim Gurfein (Mexico) Gilberto Cicero

=== April ===
Week of	Tournament	Champions	Runners-up	Semifinalists	Quarterfinalists
April 4	Madeira-2 Challenger; Madeira, Portugal $25,000 – hard – 32S/16D; Singles draw – Doubles draw	(Spain) Francisco Roig; 6-4, 1–0, Ret.	(Australia) Richard Fromberg	(Australia) Jason Stoltenberg (Australia) Johan Anderson	(Australia) Carl Turich (West Germany) Gerald Marzenell (Belgium) Xavier Daufresne (Australia) Shane Barr
April 4	Madeira-2 Challenger; Madeira, Portugal $25,000 – hard – 32S/16D; Singles draw – Doubles draw	(Australia) Jason Stoltenberg (Australia) Todd Woodbridge; 6–2, 6-4	(United Kingdom) David Felgate (United Kingdom) Nick Fulwood	(Australia) Jason Stoltenberg (Australia) Johan Anderson	(Australia) Carl Turich (West Germany) Gerald Marzenell (Belgium) Xavier Daufresne (Australia) Shane Barr
April 11	Jerusalem Challenger; Jerusalem, Israel $25,000 – hard – 32S/16D; Singles draw – Doubles draw	(Israel) Gilad Bloom; 6–1, 7–5	(West Germany) Christian Geyer	(Israel) Boaz Merenstein (Denmark) Morten Christensen	(Israel) Shahar Perkiss (Israel) Amit Naor (Sweden) Lars Holmblad (Israel) Tomer Zimmerman
April 11	Jerusalem Challenger; Jerusalem, Israel $25,000 – hard – 32S/16D; Singles draw – Doubles draw	(Israel) Shlomo Glickstein (Israel) Shahar Perkiss; 3–6, 6–3, 6–3	(Israel) Menashe Tzur (Israel) Ohad Weinberg	(Israel) Boaz Merenstein (Denmark) Morten Christensen	(Israel) Shahar Perkiss (Israel) Amit Naor (Sweden) Lars Holmblad (Israel) Tomer Zimmerman
April 11	Rio de Janeiro Open; Rio de Janeiro, Brazil $75,000 – carpet – 32S/16D; Singles draw – Doubles draw	(Argentina) Javier Frana; 7–5, 4–6, 6–3	(Brazil) Cássio Motta	(New Zealand) Kelly Evernden (New Zealand) Steve Guy	(New Zealand) David Lewis (United States) Tim Wilkison (Argentina) Horacio de la Peña (United States) Jim Courier
April 11	Rio de Janeiro Open; Rio de Janeiro, Brazil $75,000 – carpet – 32S/16D; Singles draw – Doubles draw	(New Zealand) Bruce Derlin (Nigeria) Tony Mmoh; 6–7, 7–5, 6–3	(Argentina) Horacio de la Peña (Argentina) Javier Frana	(New Zealand) Kelly Evernden (New Zealand) Steve Guy	(New Zealand) David Lewis (United States) Tim Wilkison (Argentina) Horacio de la Peña (United States) Jim Courier
April 18	Vilamoura Challenger; Vilamoura, Portugal $25,000 – hard – 32S/16D; Singles draw – Doubles draw	(South Africa) Barry Moir; 6–1, 6–2	(Canada) Stéphane Bonneau	(Australia) Peter Doohan (Portugal) Nuno Marques	(West Germany) Gerald Marzenell (Spain) Vicente Solves (Spain) Jorge Bardou (Sweden) Christer Allgårdh
April 18	Vilamoura Challenger; Vilamoura, Portugal $25,000 – hard – 32S/16D; Singles draw – Doubles draw	(Australia) Peter Doohan (Australia) Michael Fancutt; 6–4, 6-3	(Canada) Stéphane Bonneau (Brazil) Fabio Silberberg	(Australia) Peter Doohan (Portugal) Nuno Marques	(West Germany) Gerald Marzenell (Spain) Vicente Solves (Spain) Jorge Bardou (Sweden) Christer Allgårdh
April 25	Lisbon Challenger; Lisbon, Portugal $50,000 – clay – 32S/16D; Singles draw – Doubles draw	(Argentina) Alberto Mancini; 6–3, 6–2	(Australia) Peter Doohan	(Spain) Fernando Luna (West Germany) Udo Riglewski	(Spain) Juan Avendaño (Portugal) João Cunha e Silva (Austria) Alex Antonitsch (Brazil) José Daher
April 25	Lisbon Challenger; Lisbon, Portugal $50,000 – clay – 32S/16D; Singles draw – Doubles draw	(Australia) Jason Stoltenberg (Australia) Todd Woodbridge; 6–3, 5–7, 6–4	(Austria) Alex Antonitsch (West Germany) Udo Riglewski	(Spain) Fernando Luna (West Germany) Udo Riglewski	(Spain) Juan Avendaño (Portugal) João Cunha e Silva (Austria) Alex Antonitsch (Brazil) José Daher
April 25	Nagoya Challenger; Nagoya, Japan $50,000 – hard – 32S/16D; Singles draw – Doubles draw	(United Kingdom) Andrew Castle; 6–1, 7–5	(United States) Tim Pawsat	(Japan) Shozo Shiraishi (Japan) Shuzo Matsuoka	(United States) John Letts (Japan) Masayoshi Takeyari (United States) Peter Palandjian (United States) Joel Bailey
April 25	Nagoya Challenger; Nagoya, Japan $50,000 – hard – 32S/16D; Singles draw – Doubles draw	(United States) Glenn Layendecker (United States) John Letts; 7–6, 6-3	(New Zealand) Steve Guy (Japan) Shuzo Matsuoka	(Japan) Shozo Shiraishi (Japan) Shuzo Matsuoka	(United States) John Letts (Japan) Masayoshi Takeyari (United States) Peter Palandjian (United States) Joel Bailey

=== May ===
Week of	Tournament	Champions	Runners-up	Semifinalists	Quarterfinalists
May 2	No tournaments scheduled.				
May 9	São Paulo-2 Challenger; São Paulo, Brazil $25,000 – hard – 32S/16D; Singles draw – Doubles draw	(Brazil) Mauro Menezes; 7–5, 6–7, 6–4	(Brazil) Cássio Motta	(Brazil) Júlio Góes (Brazil) José Daher	(Brazil) Jaime Oncins (Brazil) Ivan Kley (Brazil) Jose Wasserfirer (Brazil) Roger Guedes
May 9	São Paulo-2 Challenger; São Paulo, Brazil $25,000 – hard – 32S/16D; Singles draw – Doubles draw	(Brazil) Marcos Hocevar (Brazil) Alexandre Hocevar; 6–4, 6–7, 6–4	(Brazil) Ivan Kley (Brazil) Fernando Roese	(Brazil) Júlio Góes (Brazil) José Daher	(Brazil) Jaime Oncins (Brazil) Ivan Kley (Brazil) Jose Wasserfirer (Brazil) Roger Guedes
May 9	Raleigh Challenger; Raleigh, United States $25,000 – clay – 32S/16D; Singles draw – Doubles draw	(South Africa) Barry Moir; 6–1, 6–2	(Sweden) Tobias Svantesson	(United States) John Boytim (Argentina) Guillermo Rivas	(South Africa) Kevin Moir (Israel) Amit Naor (United States) Peter Palandjian (Mexico) Francisco Maciel
May 9	Raleigh Challenger; Raleigh, United States $25,000 – clay – 32S/16D; Singles draw – Doubles draw	(Australia) David Macpherson (Australia) Simon Youl; 7–5, 7-5	(United States) John Sobel (United States) Phil Williamson	(United States) John Boytim (Argentina) Guillermo Rivas	(South Africa) Kevin Moir (Israel) Amit Naor (United States) Peter Palandjian (Mexico) Francisco Maciel
May 9	Salzburg Challenger; Salzburg, Austria $75,000 – clay – 32S/16D; Singles draw – Doubles draw	(Socialist Federal Republic of Yugoslavia) Bruno Orešar; 6–2, 2–6, 6–2	(West Germany) Damir Keretić	(Mexico) Leonardo Lavalle (Argentina) Christian Miniussi	(France) Thierry Champion (France) Jean-Philippe Fleurian (France) Tarik Benhabiles (Spain) Eduardo Osta
May 9	Salzburg Challenger; Salzburg, Austria $75,000 – clay – 32S/16D; Singles draw – Doubles draw	(West Germany) Damir Keretić (Uruguay) Diego Pérez; 6–2, 6-4	(France) Jean-Philippe Fleurian (West Germany) Andreas Maurer	(Mexico) Leonardo Lavalle (Argentina) Christian Miniussi	(France) Thierry Champion (France) Jean-Philippe Fleurian (France) Tarik Benhabiles (Spain) Eduardo Osta
May 9	Waiblingen Challenger; Waiblingen, West Germany $25,000 – clay – 32S/16D; Singles draw – Doubles draw	(Switzerland) Roland Stadler; 6–4, 6–4	(West Germany) Frank Dennhardt	(Argentina) Marcelo Ingaramo (Argentina) Roberto Argüello	(West Germany) Christian Weis (Australia) Richard Fromberg (West Germany) Wolfgang Popp (West Germany) Alexander Mronz
May 9	Waiblingen Challenger; Waiblingen, West Germany $25,000 – clay – 32S/16D; Singles draw – Doubles draw	(Sweden) Rikard Bergh (United States) Julian Barham; 6–4, 7-5	(Italy) Ugo Colombini (Italy) Simone Colombo	(Argentina) Marcelo Ingaramo (Argentina) Roberto Argüello	(West Germany) Christian Weis (Australia) Richard Fromberg (West Germany) Wolfgang Popp (West Germany) Alexander Mronz
May 16	No tournaments scheduled.				
May 23	No tournaments scheduled.				
May 30	Montabaur Challenger; Montabaur, West Germany $25,000 – clay – 32S/16D; Singles draw – Doubles draw	(West Germany) Markus Rackl; 6–3, 4–6, 7–5	(Socialist Federal Republic of Yugoslavia) Bruno Orešar	(United States) Michael Robertson (Sweden) Rikard Bergh	(Sweden) Christer Allgårdh (West Germany) Christian Geyer (Italy) Massimo Cierro (Australia) Carl Limberger
May 30	Montabaur Challenger; Montabaur, West Germany $25,000 – clay – 32S/16D; Singles draw – Doubles draw	(Portugal) João Cunha e Silva (Poland) Wojciech Kowalski; 6–2, 7-6	(West Germany) Wolfgang Popp (West Germany) Udo Riglewski	(United States) Michael Robertson (Sweden) Rikard Bergh	(Sweden) Christer Allgårdh (West Germany) Christian Geyer (Italy) Massimo Cierro (Australia) Carl Limberger

=== June ===
Week of	Tournament	Champions	Runners-up	Semifinalists	Quarterfinalists
June 6	Dijon Challenger; Dijon, France $25,000 – carpet – 32S/16D; Singles draw – Doubles draw	(Sweden) Ronnie Båthman; 7–6, 6–1	(Sweden) Tobias Svantesson	(West Germany) Christian Geyer (Brazil) Givaldo Barbosa	(Austria) Michael Oberleitner (United States) Luke Jensen (Chile) Gerardo Vacarezza (Canada) Stéphane Bonneau
June 6	Dijon Challenger; Dijon, France $25,000 – carpet – 32S/16D; Singles draw – Doubles draw	(United States) Howard Endelman (Australia) Gavin Pfitzner; 7–6, 6–7, 6–4	(Romania) Mihnea-Ion Năstase (Mexico) Fernando Pérez Pascal	(West Germany) Christian Geyer (Brazil) Givaldo Barbosa	(Austria) Michael Oberleitner (United States) Luke Jensen (Chile) Gerardo Vacarezza (Canada) Stéphane Bonneau
June 13	Parioli Challenger; Rome, Italy $25,000 – clay – 32S/16D; Singles draw – Doubles draw	(Italy) Massimo Cierro; 6–1, 6–1	(Sweden) Thomas Haldin	(Italy) Simone Restelli (Brazil) Marcelo Hennemann	(Italy) Paolo Bardessa (Spain) Juan Carlos Báguena (West Germany) Christian Geyer (Austria) Stefan Lochbihler
June 13	Parioli Challenger; Rome, Italy $25,000 – clay – 32S/16D; Singles draw – Doubles draw	(West Germany) Andreas Lesch (West Germany) Torben Theine; 6–3, 6-1	(Italy) Massimo Cierro (Italy) Alessandro de Minicis	(Italy) Simone Restelli (Brazil) Marcelo Hennemann	(Italy) Paolo Bardessa (Spain) Juan Carlos Báguena (West Germany) Christian Geyer (Austria) Stefan Lochbihler
June 20	Clermont-Ferrand Challenger; Clermont-Ferrand, France $75,000 – clay – 32S/16D; Singles draw – Doubles draw	(Uruguay) Marcelo Filippini; 6–2, 7–6	(Argentina) Marcelo Ingaramo	(Spain) Jordi Arrese (West Germany) Hans Schwaier	(Spain) Juan Aguilera (Portugal) João Cunha e Silva (Poland) Wojciech Kowalski (Italy) Claudio Pistolesi
June 20	Clermont-Ferrand Challenger; Clermont-Ferrand, France $75,000 – clay – 32S/16D; Singles draw – Doubles draw	(United States) Rill Baxter (Sweden) Jörgen Windahl; 7–6, 6-4	(France) Jean-Philippe Fleurian (West Germany) Andreas Maurer	(Spain) Jordi Arrese (West Germany) Hans Schwaier	(Spain) Juan Aguilera (Portugal) João Cunha e Silva (Poland) Wojciech Kowalski (Italy) Claudio Pistolesi
June 20	Salou Challenger; Salou, Spain $25,000 – clay – 32S/16D; Singles draw – Doubles draw	(Netherlands) Mark Koevermans; 6–0, 6–2	(Chile) Sergio Cortés	(Spain) Eduardo Osta (Sweden) Thomas Haldin	(Spain) David de Miguel (France) Jean-Marc Piacentile (Spain) Jesús Colás (Spain) Gabriel Urpí
June 20	Salou Challenger; Salou, Spain $25,000 – clay – 32S/16D; Singles draw – Doubles draw	(Brazil) Marcelo Hennemann (France) Jean-Marc Piacentile; 6–4, 6-1	(United States) Scott Patridge (United States) Otis Smith	(Spain) Eduardo Osta (Sweden) Thomas Haldin	(Spain) David de Miguel (France) Jean-Marc Piacentile (Spain) Jesús Colás (Spain) Gabriel Urpí
June 27	Tarbes Challenger; Tarbes, France $25,000 – clay – 32S/16D; Singles draw – Doubles draw	(Spain) Eduardo Osta; 7–6, 6–4	(Spain) Jesús Colás	(Argentina) Roberto Argüello (Brazil) César Kist	(West Germany) Hans-Dieter Beutel (France) Philippe Pech (Spain) Gabriel Urpí (Sweden) Jörgen Windahl
June 27	Tarbes Challenger; Tarbes, France $25,000 – clay – 32S/16D; Singles draw – Doubles draw	(Portugal) João Cunha e Silva (Sweden) Jörgen Windahl; 6–2, 6-1	(Brazil) Eduardo Furusho (Brazil) César Kist	(Argentina) Roberto Argüello (Brazil) César Kist	(West Germany) Hans-Dieter Beutel (France) Philippe Pech (Spain) Gabriel Urpí (Sweden) Jörgen Windahl

=== July ===
Week of	Tournament	Champions	Runners-up	Semifinalists	Quarterfinalists
July 4	Dublin Challenger (Republic of Ireland) Dublin, Ireland $25,000 – carpet – 32S/16D; Singles draw – Doubles draw	(United Kingdom) Neil Broad; 7–6, 4–6, 6–3	(Sweden) Tobias Svantesson	(Brazil) Alexandre Hocevar (United Kingdom) David Felgate	(France) Lindsay Rawstorne (South Africa) Piet Norval (Republic of Ireland) Owen Casey (United States) Peter Wright
July 4	Dublin Challenger (Republic of Ireland) Dublin, Ireland $25,000 – carpet – 32S/16D; Singles draw – Doubles draw	(United Kingdom) Neil Broad (South Africa) Stefan Kruger; 4–6, 7–5, 7–6	(Brazil) Marcos Hocevar (Brazil) Alexandre Hocevar	(Brazil) Alexandre Hocevar (United Kingdom) David Felgate	(France) Lindsay Rawstorne (South Africa) Piet Norval (Republic of Ireland) Owen Casey (United States) Peter Wright
July 4	Travemünde Challenger; Travemünde, West Germany $25,000 – clay – 32S/16D; Singles draw – Doubles draw	(Sweden) Conny Falk; 7–6, 6–3	(Poland) Wojciech Kowalski	(Italy) Massimo Cierro (West Germany) Hans-Dieter Beutel	(Mexico) Agustín Moreno (Sweden) Lars-Anders Wahlgren (West Germany) Sascha Nensel (West Germany) Christian Geyer
July 4	Travemünde Challenger; Travemünde, West Germany $25,000 – clay – 32S/16D; Singles draw – Doubles draw	(Socialist Federal Republic of Yugoslavia) Igor Flego (Netherlands) Mark Koevermans; 6–4, 6–7, 6–3	(United States) Brett Dickinson (France) Jean-Marc Piacentile	(Italy) Massimo Cierro (West Germany) Hans-Dieter Beutel	(Mexico) Agustín Moreno (Sweden) Lars-Anders Wahlgren (West Germany) Sascha Nensel (West Germany) Christian Geyer
July 11	Porto Challenger; Porto, Portugal $50,000 – clay – 32S/16D; Singles draw – Doubles draw	(Netherlands) Paul Dogger; 6–2, 3–6, 6–3	(Netherlands) Michiel Schapers	(West Germany) Frank Dennhardt (Soviet Union) Andrei Olhovskiy	(Spain) Juan Avendaño (United Kingdom) Andrew Castle (Portugal) Nuno Marques (Argentina) Gustavo Giussani
July 11	Porto Challenger; Porto, Portugal $50,000 – clay – 32S/16D; Singles draw – Doubles draw	(Netherlands) Michiel Schapers (Netherlands) Huub van Boeckel; 6–3, 3–6, 7–6	(Soviet Union) Andrei Olhovskiy (Soviet Union) Alexander Zverev	(West Germany) Frank Dennhardt (Soviet Union) Andrei Olhovskiy	(Spain) Juan Avendaño (United Kingdom) Andrew Castle (Portugal) Nuno Marques (Argentina) Gustavo Giussani
July 11	São Paulo-3 Challenger; São Paulo, Brazil $25,000 – clay – 32S/16D; Singles draw – Doubles draw	(Brazil) Luiz Mattar; 7–5, 7–6	(Brazil) Cássio Motta	(Brazil) Fernando Roese (Brazil) César Kist	(Brazil) João Zwetsch (Brazil) José Daher (Brazil) Danilo Marcelino (Spain) José Clavet
July 11	São Paulo-3 Challenger; São Paulo, Brazil $25,000 – clay – 32S/16D; Singles draw – Doubles draw	(Brazil) Givaldo Barbosa (Brazil) Ricardo Camargo; 5–7, 7–6, 7–6	(Brazil) Marcos Hocevar (Brazil) Alexandre Hocevar	(Brazil) Fernando Roese (Brazil) César Kist	(Brazil) João Zwetsch (Brazil) José Daher (Brazil) Danilo Marcelino (Spain) José Clavet
July 11	Tampere Open; Tampere, Finland $50,000 – clay – 32S/16D; Singles draw – Doubles draw	(Soviet Union) Andres Võsand; 6–1, 6–1	(Sweden) Christer Allgårdh	(Finland) Veli Paloheimo (Sweden) Per Henricsson	(Greece) George Kalovelonis (Sweden) Nicklas Utgren (France) Loïc Courteau (Italy) Massimo Cierro
July 11	Tampere Open; Tampere, Finland $50,000 – clay – 32S/16D; Singles draw – Doubles draw	(Socialist Federal Republic of Yugoslavia) Igor Flego (Netherlands) Mark Koevermans; 6–4, 6-1	(Finland) Mika Hedman (Finland) Veli Paloheimo	(Finland) Veli Paloheimo (Sweden) Per Henricsson	(Greece) George Kalovelonis (Sweden) Nicklas Utgren (France) Loïc Courteau (Italy) Massimo Cierro
July 18	Franken Challenge; Fürth, West Germany $25,000 – clay – 32S/16D; Singles draw – Doubles draw	(West Germany) Hans-Dieter Beutel; 1–6, 6–3, 6–4	(Czechoslovakia) Richard Vogel	(West Germany) Milan Palme (Czechoslovakia) Stanislav Birner	(Israel) Gilad Bloom (Czechoslovakia) Josef Čihák (West Germany) Peter Moraing (Poland) Wojciech Kowalski
July 18	Franken Challenge; Fürth, West Germany $25,000 – clay – 32S/16D; Singles draw – Doubles draw	(West Germany) Michael Stich (West Germany) Martin Sinner; 4–6, 6–3, 7–6	(Poland) Wojciech Kowalski (Romania) Adrian Marcu	(West Germany) Milan Palme (Czechoslovakia) Stanislav Birner	(Israel) Gilad Bloom (Czechoslovakia) Josef Čihák (West Germany) Peter Moraing (Poland) Wojciech Kowalski
July 18	Hanko Challenger; Hanko, Finland $50,000 – clay – 32S/16D; Singles draw – Doubles draw	(United States) Lawson Duncan; 6–2, 6–4	(Sweden) Christer Allgårdh	(Sweden) Jan Apell (Finland) Veli Paloheimo	(Soviet Union) Andres Võsand (Sweden) Jörgen Windahl (France) Loïc Courteau (Sweden) Tomas Nydahl
July 18	Hanko Challenger; Hanko, Finland $50,000 – clay – 32S/16D; Singles draw – Doubles draw	(Denmark) Morten Christensen (Denmark) Michael Tauson; 6–2, 6-1	(Finland) Joakim Berner (Sweden) Tomas Nydahl	(Sweden) Jan Apell (Finland) Veli Paloheimo	(Soviet Union) Andres Võsand (Sweden) Jörgen Windahl (France) Loïc Courteau (Sweden) Tomas Nydahl
July 18	Johannesburg-1 Challenger; Johannesburg, South Africa $40,000 – hard – 32S/16D; Singles draw – Doubles draw	(United Kingdom) Neil Broad; 3–6, 6–4, 6–4	(South Africa) Piet Norval	(South Africa) David Nainkin (South Africa) Wayne Ferreira	(United States) Gary Donnelly (South Africa) Stefan Kruger (United Kingdom) Jason Goodall (United States) Mel Purcell
July 18	Johannesburg-1 Challenger; Johannesburg, South Africa $40,000 – hard – 32S/16D; Singles draw – Doubles draw	(United States) Mike De Palmer (United States) Gary Donnelly; 7–6, 7-6	(South Africa) Warren Green (South Africa) Piet Norval	(South Africa) David Nainkin (South Africa) Wayne Ferreira	(United States) Gary Donnelly (South Africa) Stefan Kruger (United Kingdom) Jason Goodall (United States) Mel Purcell
July 18	Santos Challenger; Santos, Brazil $25,000 – clay – 32S/16D; Singles draw – Doubles draw	(Brazil) Danilo Marcelino; 6–3, 3–6, 6–3	(Brazil) Marcelo Hennemann	(Brazil) Ivan Kley (Brazil) Dácio Campos	(Brazil) Roberto Jabali (Brazil) Fernando Roese (Brazil) Ricardo Acioly (West Germany) Peter Ballauff
July 18	Santos Challenger; Santos, Brazil $25,000 – clay – 32S/16D; Singles draw – Doubles draw	(Brazil) Danilo Marcelino (Brazil) Mauro Menezes; 3–6, 6–1, 6–2	(Spain) José Clavet (Spain) Francisco Clavet	(Brazil) Ivan Kley (Brazil) Dácio Campos	(Brazil) Roberto Jabali (Brazil) Fernando Roese (Brazil) Ricardo Acioly (West Germany) Peter Ballauff
July 25	Comerica Bank Challenger; Aptos, United States $25,000 – hard – 32S/16D; Singles draw – Doubles draw	(United States) Brad Pearce; 6–3, 6–2	(United States) Tim Pawsat	(United States) Martin Barba (United States) Chuck Adams	(Sweden) Rikard Bergh (South Africa) Craig Campbell (United States) Glenn Layendecker (United States) Kelly Jones
July 25	Comerica Bank Challenger; Aptos, United States $25,000 – hard – 32S/16D; Singles draw – Doubles draw	(United States) Jeff Klaparda (United States) Peter Palandjian; 6–3, 6-4	(United States) Ed Nagel (United States) Jeff Tarango	(United States) Martin Barba (United States) Chuck Adams	(Sweden) Rikard Bergh (South Africa) Craig Campbell (United States) Glenn Layendecker (United States) Kelly Jones
July 25	Campos Challenger; Campos, Brazil $25,000 – hard – 32S/16D; Singles draw – Doubles draw	(Brazil) Cássio Motta; 6–4, 4–6, 6–2	(Brazil) Fernando Roese	(Brazil) Ivan Kley (Brazil) Mauro Menezes	(Brazil) Júlio Góes (Peru) Carlos di Laura (Brazil) Danilo Marcelino (Brazil) Dácio Campos
July 25	Campos Challenger; Campos, Brazil $25,000 – hard – 32S/16D; Singles draw – Doubles draw	(Brazil) Ivan Kley (Brazil) Fernando Roese; 6–4, 6-4	(Brazil) Danilo Marcelino (Brazil) Mauro Menezes	(Brazil) Ivan Kley (Brazil) Mauro Menezes	(Brazil) Júlio Góes (Peru) Carlos di Laura (Brazil) Danilo Marcelino (Brazil) Dácio Campos
July 25	Neu-Ulm Challenger; Neu-Ulm, West Germany $25,000 – clay – 32S/16D; Singles draw – Doubles draw	(Ecuador) Raúl Viver; 7–5, 6–2	(Sweden) Stefan Eriksson	(Argentina) Marcelo Ingaramo (Czechoslovakia) Richard Vogel	(Argentina) Roberto Argüello (Italy) Simone Colombo (Czechoslovakia) Jaroslav Navrátil (Czechoslovakia) Martin Střelba
July 25	Neu-Ulm Challenger; Neu-Ulm, West Germany $25,000 – clay – 32S/16D; Singles draw – Doubles draw	(West Germany) Michael Stich (West Germany) Martin Sinner; 6–3, 6-4	(Switzerland) Heinz Günthardt (Hungary) Balázs Taróczy	(Argentina) Marcelo Ingaramo (Czechoslovakia) Richard Vogel	(Argentina) Roberto Argüello (Italy) Simone Colombo (Czechoslovakia) Jaroslav Navrátil (Czechoslovakia) Martin Střelba

=== August ===
Week of	Tournament	Champions	Runners-up	Semifinalists	Quarterfinalists
August 1	Geneva Open Challenger; Geneva, Switzerland $25,000 – clay – 32S/16D; Singles draw – Doubles draw	(Argentina) Gustavo Giussani; 6–4, 2–6, 6–3	(Italy) Simone Colombo	(Israel) Amit Naor (Ecuador) Raúl Viver	(Czechoslovakia) Karel Nováček (United States) Brett Dickinson (Sweden) Lars-Anders Wahlgren (Romania) Mihnea-Ion Năstase
August 1	Geneva Open Challenger; Geneva, Switzerland $25,000 – clay – 32S/16D; Singles draw – Doubles draw	(Italy) Nevio Devide (Switzerland) Stefano Mezzadri; 7–6, 4–6, 6–4	(Romania) Mihnea-Ion Năstase (India) Srinivasan Vasudevan	(Israel) Amit Naor (Ecuador) Raúl Viver	(Czechoslovakia) Karel Nováček (United States) Brett Dickinson (Sweden) Lars-Anders Wahlgren (Romania) Mihnea-Ion Năstase
August 1	Lins Challenger; Lins, Brazil $25,000 – clay – 32S/16D; Singles draw – Doubles draw	(Brazil) Danilo Marcelino; 6–3, 6–3	(Brazil) Fernando Roese	(Brazil) Alexandre Hocevar (Brazil) Ivan Kley	(Brazil) José Daher (Brazil) Júlio Góes (Brazil) Dácio Campos (West Germany) Peter Ballauff
August 1	Lins Challenger; Lins, Brazil $25,000 – clay – 32S/16D; Singles draw – Doubles draw	(Brazil) Givaldo Barbosa (Brazil) Ricardo Camargo; 6–1, 3–6, 6–3	(Brazil) Marcelo Hennemann (Brazil) Edvaldo Oliveira	(Brazil) Alexandre Hocevar (Brazil) Ivan Kley	(Brazil) José Daher (Brazil) Júlio Góes (Brazil) Dácio Campos (West Germany) Peter Ballauff
August 1	Seattle Challenger (United States) Seattle, USA $25,000 – hard – 32S/16D; Singles draw – Doubles draw	(United States) Glenn Layendecker; 6–2, 6–4	(Sweden) Johan Carlsson	(United States) Jeff Tarango (United States) Brad Pearce	(United States) Peter Palandjian (United States) Malcolm Allen (Finland) Olli Rahnasto (Italy) Gianluca Pozzi
August 1	Seattle Challenger (United States) Seattle, USA $25,000 – hard – 32S/16D; Singles draw – Doubles draw	(United States) Buff Farrow (United States) Jim Gurfein; 6–1, 6-4	(United States) Patrick Galbraith (United States) Brian Garrow	(United States) Jeff Tarango (United States) Brad Pearce	(United States) Peter Palandjian (United States) Malcolm Allen (Finland) Olli Rahnasto (Italy) Gianluca Pozzi
August 8	Crans-Montana Challenger; Crans-Montana, Switzerland $25,000 – clay – 32S/16D; Singles draw – Doubles draw	(Argentina) Guillermo Rivas; 1–6, 6–3, 6–4	(Sweden) Lars-Anders Wahlgren	(Chile) Gerardo Vacarezza (France) Arnaud Boetsch	(Italy) Alberto Paris (Australia) Paul Mick (Switzerland) Marc Rosset (Socialist Federal Republic of Yugoslavia) Marko Ostoja
August 8	Crans-Montana Challenger; Crans-Montana, Switzerland $25,000 – clay – 32S/16D; Singles draw – Doubles draw	(Sweden) Peter Svensson (Sweden) Lars-Anders Wahlgren; 6–4, 6-4	(Sweden) Conny Falk (Sweden) Stefan Svensson	(Chile) Gerardo Vacarezza (France) Arnaud Boetsch	(Italy) Alberto Paris (Australia) Paul Mick (Switzerland) Marc Rosset (Socialist Federal Republic of Yugoslavia) Marko Ostoja
August 8	Knokke Challenger; Knokke, Belgium $25,000 – clay – 32S/16D; Singles draw – Doubles draw	(Sweden) Per Henricsson; 6–3, 7–6	(France) Patrice Kuchna	(Belgium) Bart Wuyts (Spain) Francisco Roig	(Netherlands) Paul Haarhuis (West Germany) Peter Ballauff (Belgium) Pierre Godfroid (Spain) José Luis Aparisi
August 8	Knokke Challenger; Knokke, Belgium $25,000 – clay – 32S/16D; Singles draw – Doubles draw	(United Kingdom) David Ison (United Kingdom) Richard Whichello; 6–4, 6-3	(Australia) Kurt Robinson (Australia) Justin Stead	(Belgium) Bart Wuyts (Spain) Francisco Roig	(Netherlands) Paul Haarhuis (West Germany) Peter Ballauff (Belgium) Pierre Godfroid (Spain) José Luis Aparisi
August 8	Nielsen Pro Tennis Championship (United States) Winnetka, USA $25,000 – hard – 32S/16D; Singles draw – Doubles draw	(United States) Jeff Tarango; 7–5, 5–7, 6–2	(Italy) Gianluca Pozzi	(Sweden) Rikard Bergh (India) Vijay Amritraj	(Sweden) Tobias Svantesson (United States) Philip Johnson (United States) Steve Herdoiza (United States) Robbie Weiss
August 8	Nielsen Pro Tennis Championship (United States) Winnetka, USA $25,000 – hard – 32S/16D; Singles draw – Doubles draw	(Chile) Ricardo Acuña (South Africa) Royce Deppe; 6–4, 6-4	(United States) Jared Palmer (United States) Pete Sampras	(Sweden) Rikard Bergh (India) Vijay Amritraj	(Sweden) Tobias Svantesson (United States) Philip Johnson (United States) Steve Herdoiza (United States) Robbie Weiss
August 15	Eger Challenger; Eger, Hungary $25,000 – clay – 32S/16D; Singles draw – Doubles draw	(Czechoslovakia) Karel Nováček; 7–5, 6–1	(Czechoslovakia) Martin Střelba	(Czechoslovakia) Richard Vogel (Czechoslovakia) Jaroslav Bulant	(Czechoslovakia) Václav Roubíček (Spain) Carlos Costa (Denmark) Michael Tauson (Austria) Gilbert Schaller
August 15	Eger Challenger; Eger, Hungary $25,000 – clay – 32S/16D; Singles draw – Doubles draw	(Czechoslovakia) Jaroslav Bulant (Czechoslovakia) Vojtěch Flégl; 6–4, 6-4	(Czechoslovakia) Karel Nováček (Czechoslovakia) Richard Vogel	(Czechoslovakia) Richard Vogel (Czechoslovakia) Jaroslav Bulant	(Czechoslovakia) Václav Roubíček (Spain) Carlos Costa (Denmark) Michael Tauson (Austria) Gilbert Schaller
August 15	New Haven Challenger; New Haven, United States $25,000 – hard – 32S/16D; Singles draw – Doubles draw	(India) Vijay Amritraj; 6–3, 6–1	(India) Zeeshan Ali	(Jamaica) Doug Burke (United States) MaliVai Washington	(United States) Marcel Freeman (United States) Luke Jensen (United States) John Boytim (United States) Brian Garrow
August 15	New Haven Challenger; New Haven, United States $25,000 – hard – 32S/16D; Singles draw – Doubles draw	(United States) Jeff Klaparda (United States) Peter Palandjian; 6–2, 7-5	(India) Zeeshan Ali (United Kingdom) Chris Bailey	(Jamaica) Doug Burke (United States) MaliVai Washington	(United States) Marcel Freeman (United States) Luke Jensen (United States) John Boytim (United States) Brian Garrow
August 15	Ostend Challenger; Ostend, Belgium $25,000 – clay – 32S/16D; Singles draw – Doubles draw	(Chile) Gerardo Vacarezza; 6–1, 6–1	(India) Srinivasan Vasudevan	(France) Sébastien Gérard (Chile) Rubén Gajardo	(West Germany) Peter Ballauff (France) Arnaud Boetsch (Italy) Marcello Bassanelli (Italy) Paolo Pambianco
August 15	Ostend Challenger; Ostend, Belgium $25,000 – clay – 32S/16D; Singles draw – Doubles draw	(Sweden) Per Henricsson (Sweden) Nicklas Utgren; 6–1, 7-5	(Finland) Joakim Berner (Sweden) Tomas Nydahl	(France) Sébastien Gérard (Chile) Rubén Gajardo	(West Germany) Peter Ballauff (France) Arnaud Boetsch (Italy) Marcello Bassanelli (Italy) Paolo Pambianco
August 15	San Marino CEPU Open; City of San Marino, San Marino $75,000 – clay – 32S/16D; Singles draw – Doubles draw	(Italy) Paolo Canè; 6–7, 6–3, 6–3	(Italy) Francesco Cancellotti	(Switzerland) Claudio Mezzadri (Ecuador) Raúl Viver	(Sweden) Thomas Haldin (Argentina) Marcelo Ingaramo (Argentina) Guillermo Vilas (Italy) Fabio Di Mauro
August 15	San Marino CEPU Open; City of San Marino, San Marino $75,000 – clay – 32S/16D; Singles draw – Doubles draw	(Sweden) Christer Allgårdh (Czechoslovakia) Josef Čihák; 6–4, 6-2	(Portugal) João Cunha e Silva (Sweden) Jörgen Windahl	(Switzerland) Claudio Mezzadri (Ecuador) Raúl Viver	(Sweden) Thomas Haldin (Argentina) Marcelo Ingaramo (Argentina) Guillermo Vilas (Italy) Fabio Di Mauro
August 22	Pescara Challenger; Pescara, Italy $25,000 – clay – 32S/16D; Singles draw – Doubles draw	(Czechoslovakia) Josef Čihák; 6–4, 6–3	(Chile) Gerardo Vacarezza	(Italy) Ugo Pigato (Italy) Michele Fioroni	(Spain) Francisco Roig (Sweden) Ronnie Båthman (Italy) Paolo Pambianco (Sweden) Thomas Haldin
August 22	Pescara Challenger; Pescara, Italy $25,000 – clay – 32S/16D; Singles draw – Doubles draw	(Sweden) Ronnie Båthman (Italy) Alessandro de Minicis; 4–6, 6–3, 6–3	(Czechoslovakia) Josef Čihák (Czechoslovakia) Richard Vogel	(Italy) Ugo Pigato (Italy) Michele Fioroni	(Spain) Francisco Roig (Sweden) Ronnie Båthman (Italy) Paolo Pambianco (Sweden) Thomas Haldin
August 22	Rümikon Challenger; Rümikon, Switzerland $25,000 – clay – 32S/16D; Singles draw – Doubles draw	(Czechoslovakia) Jaroslav Bulant; 6–3, 6–7, 6–2	(Switzerland) Roland Stadler	(Finland) Veli Paloheimo (Czechoslovakia) Martin Střelba	(Sweden) Jan Apell (Hungary) András Lányi (Chile) José Antonio Fernández (Belgium) Denis Langaskens
August 22	Rümikon Challenger; Rümikon, Switzerland $25,000 – clay – 32S/16D; Singles draw – Doubles draw	(Sweden) Jan Apell (Finland) Veli Paloheimo; 7–5, 6–7, 6–3	(Hungary) András Lányi (Hungary) László Markovits	(Finland) Veli Paloheimo (Czechoslovakia) Martin Střelba	(Sweden) Jan Apell (Hungary) András Lányi (Chile) José Antonio Fernández (Belgium) Denis Langaskens
August 29	Azores Challenger; Azores, Portugal $25,000 – hard – 32S/16D; Singles draw – Doubles draw	(United Kingdom) Nick Fulwood; 6–3, 7–6	(Portugal) João Cunha e Silva	(France) Rodolphe Gilbert (Nigeria) Nduka Odizor	(Spain) Juan Carlos Báguena (Portugal) Pedro Cordeiro (United States) Otis Smith (Belgium) Xavier Daufresne
August 29	Azores Challenger; Azores, Portugal $25,000 – hard – 32S/16D; Singles draw – Doubles draw	(Nigeria) Nduka Odizor (France) Éric Winogradsky; 6–4, 6-4	(United States) Charles Merzbacher (United States) Otis Smith	(France) Rodolphe Gilbert (Nigeria) Nduka Odizor	(Spain) Juan Carlos Báguena (Portugal) Pedro Cordeiro (United States) Otis Smith (Belgium) Xavier Daufresne
August 29	Nyon Challenger; Nyon, Switzerland $25,000 – clay – 32S/16D; Singles draw – Doubles draw	(Sweden) Jörgen Windahl; 2–6, 6–2, 6–1	(Spain) Francisco Clavet	(Finland) Veli Paloheimo (Soviet Union) Andrei Cherkasov	(Ecuador) Raúl Viver (Czechoslovakia) Jaroslav Bulant (Soviet Union) Alexander Zverev (Hungary) Zoltán Kuhárszky
August 29	Nyon Challenger; Nyon, Switzerland $25,000 – clay – 32S/16D; Singles draw – Doubles draw	(Ecuador) Hugo Núñez (Ecuador) Raúl Viver; 2–6, 6–4, 6–1	(Sweden) Jan Apell (Finland) Veli Paloheimo	(Finland) Veli Paloheimo (Soviet Union) Andrei Cherkasov	(Ecuador) Raúl Viver (Czechoslovakia) Jaroslav Bulant (Soviet Union) Alexander Zverev (Hungary) Zoltán Kuhárszky
August 29	Verona Challenger; Verona, Italy $25,000 – clay – 32S/16D; Singles draw – Doubles draw	(Italy) Massimo Cierro; 5–7, 6–2, 7–5	(Spain) Carlos Costa	(Italy) Claudio Panatta (Czechoslovakia) Josef Čihák	(Italy) Alessandro de Minicis (Italy) Fabio Di Mauro (Italy) Renzo Furlan (Peru) Carlos di Laura
August 29	Verona Challenger; Verona, Italy $25,000 – clay – 32S/16D; Singles draw – Doubles draw	(Sweden) Ronnie Båthman (Sweden) Stefan Svensson; 6–4, 1–6, 6–4	(Italy) Marcello Bassanelli (Italy) Ugo Pigato	(Italy) Claudio Panatta (Czechoslovakia) Josef Čihák	(Italy) Alessandro de Minicis (Italy) Fabio Di Mauro (Italy) Renzo Furlan (Peru) Carlos di Laura

=== September ===
Week of	Tournament	Champions	Runners-up	Semifinalists	Quarterfinalists
September 5	Genoa Challenger; Genoa, Italy $25,000 – clay – 32S/16D; Singles draw – Doubles draw	(Italy) Paolo Canè; 6–3, 6–1	(Italy) Massimo Cierro	(Italy) Corrado Aprili (Argentina) Roberto Azar	(Italy) Claudio Panatta (Italy) Michele Fioroni (France) Stéphane Grenier (France) Arnaud Boetsch
September 5	Genoa Challenger; Genoa, Italy $25,000 – clay – 32S/16D; Singles draw – Doubles draw	(Sweden) Peter Svensson (Sweden) Lars-Anders Wahlgren; 7–5, 2–6, 6–1	(Sweden) Per Henricsson (Sweden) Nicklas Utgren	(Italy) Corrado Aprili (Argentina) Roberto Azar	(Italy) Claudio Panatta (Italy) Michele Fioroni (France) Stéphane Grenier (France) Arnaud Boetsch
September 5	Thessaloniki Challenger; Thessaloniki, Greece $25,000 – hard – 32S/16D; Singles draw – Doubles draw	(Finland) Olli Rahnasto; 6–4, 6–3	(Sweden) Thomas Högstedt	(Finland) Veli Paloheimo (Denmark) Peter Bastiansen	(West Germany) Andreas Lesch (United Kingdom) Steve Shaw (Sweden) Jan Apell (France) Éric Winogradsky
September 5	Thessaloniki Challenger; Thessaloniki, Greece $25,000 – hard – 32S/16D; Singles draw – Doubles draw	(Denmark) Morten Christensen (New Zealand) Steve Guy; 6–3, 6-4	(Hungary) András Lányi (Switzerland) Stefano Mezzadri	(Finland) Veli Paloheimo (Denmark) Peter Bastiansen	(West Germany) Andreas Lesch (United Kingdom) Steve Shaw (Sweden) Jan Apell (France) Éric Winogradsky
September 12	Budapest Challenger; Budapest, Hungary $25,000 – clay – 32S/16D; Singles draw – Doubles draw	(Switzerland) Roland Stadler; 4–6, 6–3, 6–0	(Hungary) Sándor Noszály	(Spain) José Clavet (Hungary) András Lányi	(West Germany) Peter Ballauff (Socialist Federal Republic of Yugoslavia) Marko Ostoja (France) Laurent Prades (Austria) Gilbert Schaller
September 12	Budapest Challenger; Budapest, Hungary $25,000 – clay – 32S/16D; Singles draw – Doubles draw	(Belgium) Denis Langaskens (Argentina) Eduardo Masso; 6–4, 7-5	(Denmark) Peter Bastiansen (Denmark) Peter Flintsø	(Spain) José Clavet (Hungary) András Lányi	(West Germany) Peter Ballauff (Socialist Federal Republic of Yugoslavia) Marko Ostoja (France) Laurent Prades (Austria) Gilbert Schaller
September 12	Johannesburg-2 Challenger; Johannesburg, South Africa $25,000 – grass – 32S/16D; Singles draw – Doubles draw	(United States) Matt Anger; 7–6, 6–2	(South Africa) Piet Norval	(United States) Scott Davis (South Africa) Barry Moir	(South Africa) Stefan Kruger (United Kingdom) Neil Broad (South Africa) Grant Stafford (South Africa) Byron Talbot
September 12	Johannesburg-2 Challenger; Johannesburg, South Africa $25,000 – grass – 32S/16D; Singles draw – Doubles draw	(United Kingdom) Neil Broad (South Africa) Stefan Kruger; 7–6, 6-4	(South Africa) Brent Haygarth (South Africa) Byron Talbot	(United States) Scott Davis (South Africa) Barry Moir	(South Africa) Stefan Kruger (United Kingdom) Neil Broad (South Africa) Grant Stafford (South Africa) Byron Talbot
September 12	International Tournament of Messina; Messina, Italy $50,000 – clay – 32S/16D; Singles draw – Doubles draw	(Italy) Claudio Panatta; 5–7, 6–2, 6–1	(Peru) Alejandro Aramburú	(Italy) Massimo Cierro (Canada) Martin Wostenholme	(Belgium) Bart Wuyts (Italy) Federico Mordegan (Argentina) Gerardo Mirad (Italy) Renzo Furlan
September 12	International Tournament of Messina; Messina, Italy $50,000 – clay – 32S/16D; Singles draw – Doubles draw	(Italy) Simone Colombo (Italy) Nevio Devide; 6–4, 6-4	(Italy) Ugo Colombini (Peru) Carlos di Laura	(Italy) Massimo Cierro (Canada) Martin Wostenholme	(Belgium) Bart Wuyts (Italy) Federico Mordegan (Argentina) Gerardo Mirad (Italy) Renzo Furlan
September 19	Brisbane Challenger; Brisbane, Australia $25,000 – hard – 64S/32D; Singles draw – Doubles draw	(Australia) Laurie Warder; 3–6, 6–0, 7–6	(Australia) Steve Furlong	(United States) Scott Warner (Australia) Shane Barr	(Australia) Johan Anderson (West Germany) Lars Koslowski (United States) James Schor (Australia) Richard Fromberg
September 19	Brisbane Challenger; Brisbane, Australia $25,000 – hard – 64S/32D; Singles draw – Doubles draw	(Australia) Paul Kronk (United States) Peter Wright; 6–7, 6–4, 6–4	(Australia) Steve Furlong (Australia) John Gibson	(United States) Scott Warner (Australia) Shane Barr	(Australia) Johan Anderson (West Germany) Lars Koslowski (United States) James Schor (Australia) Richard Fromberg
September 26	No tournaments scheduled.				

=== October ===
Week of	Tournament	Champions	Runners-up	Semifinalists	Quarterfinalists
October 3	Grand Prix Hassan II; Casablanca, Morocco $50,000 – clay – 32S/16D; Singles draw – Doubles draw	(Czechoslovakia) Josef Čihák; 6–4, 6–2	(Spain) David de Miguel	(United States) Lawson Duncan (Morocco) Khalid Outaleb	(Belgium) Bart Wuyts (West Germany) Frank Dennhardt (West Germany) Hans Schwaier (Argentina) Roberto Azar
October 3	Grand Prix Hassan II; Casablanca, Morocco $50,000 – clay – 32S/16D; Singles draw – Doubles draw	(Czechoslovakia) Josef Čihák (Czechoslovakia) Cyril Suk; 6–2, 6-0	(France) Arnaud Boetsch (Belgium) Denis Langaskens	(United States) Lawson Duncan (Morocco) Khalid Outaleb	(Belgium) Bart Wuyts (West Germany) Frank Dennhardt (West Germany) Hans Schwaier (Argentina) Roberto Azar
October 3	Coquitlam Challenger; Coquitlam, Canada $25,000 – hard (I) – 32S/16D; Singles draw – Doubles draw	(United States) Jonathan Stark; 6–1, 6–2	(Canada) Andrew Sznajder	(United States) Chris Garner (Puerto Rico) Miguel Nido	(United States) Scott Melville (United States) Marcel Freeman (United States) Jim Gurfein (Jamaica) Doug Burke
October 3	Coquitlam Challenger; Coquitlam, Canada $25,000 – hard (I) – 32S/16D; Singles draw – Doubles draw	(United States) Joe DeFoor (United States) Bruce Man-Son-Hing; 7–6, 7-6	(United States) Julian Barham (United States) Peter Wright	(United States) Chris Garner (Puerto Rico) Miguel Nido	(United States) Scott Melville (United States) Marcel Freeman (United States) Jim Gurfein (Jamaica) Doug Burke
October 3	Portugal Open; Estoril, Portugal $75,000 – hard – 32S/16D; Singles draw – Doubles draw	(Spain) Javier Sánchez; 4–6, 6–3, 6–2	(Italy) Gianluca Pozzi	(Sweden) Thomas Haldin (West Germany) Michael Westphal	(Czechoslovakia) Libor Pimek (Nigeria) Nduka Odizor (Czechoslovakia) Libor Němeček (France) Jean-Philippe Fleurian
October 3	Portugal Open; Estoril, Portugal $75,000 – hard – 32S/16D; Singles draw – Doubles draw	(Portugal) João Cunha e Silva (France) Jean-Philippe Fleurian; 7–6, 6-3	(Brazil) Ivan Kley (Brazil) Fernando Roese	(Sweden) Thomas Haldin (West Germany) Michael Westphal	(Czechoslovakia) Libor Pimek (Nigeria) Nduka Odizor (Czechoslovakia) Libor Němeček (France) Jean-Philippe Fleurian
October 10	Las Vegas Challenger (United States) Las Vegas, USA $25,000 – hard (I) – 32S/16D; Singles draw – Doubles draw	(Canada) Andrew Sznajder; 6–1, 6–1	(Jamaica) Doug Burke	(United States) Scott Warner (India) Vijay Amritraj	(United States) Greg Van Emburgh (United States) Chuck Adams (Puerto Rico) Miguel Nido (United States) Jim Gurfein
October 10	Las Vegas Challenger (United States) Las Vegas, USA $25,000 – hard (I) – 32S/16D; Singles draw – Doubles draw	(United States) Shelby Cannon (United States) Greg Van Emburgh; 6–2, 6-0	(United States) Julian Barham (United States) Peter Wright	(United States) Scott Warner (India) Vijay Amritraj	(United States) Greg Van Emburgh (United States) Chuck Adams (Puerto Rico) Miguel Nido (United States) Jim Gurfein
October 17	Challenger La Manche; Cherbourg, France $25,000 – hard (1) – 32S/16D; Singles draw – Doubles draw	(United States) Scott Davis; 6–3, 6–4	(Sweden) Jan Apell	(Netherlands) Menno Oosting (Finland) Olli Rahnasto	(West Germany) Frank Dennhardt (Belgium) Karel Demuynck (France) Fabrice Santoro (France) Philippe Pech
October 17	Challenger La Manche; Cherbourg, France $25,000 – hard (1) – 32S/16D; Singles draw – Doubles draw	(Sweden) Jan Apell (Sweden) Peter Nyborg; 6–2, 6-2	(Denmark) Peter Bastiansen (Denmark) Peter Flintsø	(Netherlands) Menno Oosting (Finland) Olli Rahnasto	(West Germany) Frank Dennhardt (Belgium) Karel Demuynck (France) Fabrice Santoro (France) Philippe Pech
October 24	Bergen Challenger; Bergen, Norway $75,000 – carpet (I) – 32S/16D; Singles draw – Doubles draw	(Netherlands) Tom Nijssen; 6–3, 6–1	(Canada) Grant Connell	(Sweden) Johan Carlsson (Sweden) Peter Lundgren	(Sweden) Nicklas Kulti (West Germany) Hans-Dieter Beutel (Canada) Glenn Michibata (Sweden) Magnus Larsson
October 24	Bergen Challenger; Bergen, Norway $75,000 – carpet (I) – 32S/16D; Singles draw – Doubles draw	(Czechoslovakia) Petr Korda (Czechoslovakia) Cyril Suk; 7–6, 7-6	(United Kingdom) Andrew Castle (Sweden) Tobias Svantesson	(Sweden) Johan Carlsson (Sweden) Peter Lundgren	(Sweden) Nicklas Kulti (West Germany) Hans-Dieter Beutel (Canada) Glenn Michibata (Sweden) Magnus Larsson
October 24	Singapore Open; Singapore, Singapore $25,000 – grass – 32S/16D; Singles draw – Doubles draw	(New Zealand) Steve Guy; 4–6, 7–6, 7–6	(United States) Paul Chamberlin	(Indonesia) Tintus Wibowo (United States) Malcolm Allen	(United States) Tim Pawsat (Philippines) Miguel Dungo (Australia) Peter Carter (United States) Steve DeVries
October 24	Singapore Open; Singapore, Singapore $25,000 – grass – 32S/16D; Singles draw – Doubles draw	(United States) Tim Pawsat (United States) Brad Pearce; 3–6, 6–4, 6–3	(India) Zeeshan Ali (India) Mark Ferreira	(Indonesia) Tintus Wibowo (United States) Malcolm Allen	(United States) Tim Pawsat (Philippines) Miguel Dungo (Australia) Peter Carter (United States) Steve DeVries
October 31	Bossonnens Challenger; Bossonnens, Switzerland $25,000 – hard (I) – 32S/16D; Singles draw – Doubles draw	(Finland) Olli Rahnasto; 6–3, 3–6, 6–3	(Sweden) Tomas Nydahl	(United States) Bret Garnett (Ecuador) Hugo Núñez	(Czechoslovakia) Branislav Stankovič (West Germany) Alexander Mronz (United Kingdom) Andrew Castle (Belgium) Denis Langaskens
October 31	Bossonnens Challenger; Bossonnens, Switzerland $25,000 – hard (I) – 32S/16D; Singles draw – Doubles draw	(Ecuador) Hugo Núñez (Czechoslovakia) Branislav Stankovič; 6–4, 7-6	(United States) Bret Garnett (United States) Bill Scanlon	(United States) Bret Garnett (Ecuador) Hugo Núñez	(Czechoslovakia) Branislav Stankovič (West Germany) Alexander Mronz (United Kingdom) Andrew Castle (Belgium) Denis Langaskens
October 31	Nugra Santana Challenger; Nugra Santana, Indonesia $25,000 – hard – 32S/16D; Singles draw – Doubles draw	(Australia) Shane Barr; 1–6, 7–5, 6–3	(New Zealand) Steve Guy	(United Kingdom) Steve Shaw (India) Zeeshan Ali	(United States) Brad Pearce (United Kingdom) Jason Goodall (United States) Jonathan Canter (India) Srinivasan Vasudevan
October 31	Nugra Santana Challenger; Nugra Santana, Indonesia $25,000 – hard – 32S/16D; Singles draw – Doubles draw	(United States) Tim Pawsat (United States) Brad Pearce; 6–3, 6-3	(United States) Steve DeVries (United States) John Sobel	(United Kingdom) Steve Shaw (India) Zeeshan Ali	(United States) Brad Pearce (United Kingdom) Jason Goodall (United States) Jonathan Canter (India) Srinivasan Vasudevan

=== November ===
Week of	Tournament	Champions	Runners-up	Semifinalists	Quarterfinalists
November 7	Acapulco Challenger; Acapulco, Mexico $25,000 – hard – 32S/16D; Singles draw – Doubles draw	(Mexico) Eduardo Vélez; 7–6, 7–6	(United States) Paul Chamberlin	(United States) Joe DeFoor (Australia) Peter Doohan	(United States) Bruce Man-Son-Hing (Argentina) Roberto Saad (Nigeria) Nduka Odizor (United States) Jeff Klaparda
November 7	Acapulco Challenger; Acapulco, Mexico $25,000 – hard – 32S/16D; Singles draw – Doubles draw	(United States) Shelby Cannon (United States) Greg Van Emburgh; 6–3, 6-4	(Mexico) Luis Herrera (Mexico) Javier Ordaz	(United States) Joe DeFoor (Australia) Peter Doohan	(United States) Bruce Man-Son-Hing (Argentina) Roberto Saad (Nigeria) Nduka Odizor (United States) Jeff Klaparda
November 7	Helsinki Challenger; Helsinki, Finland $25,000 – carpet (I) – 32S/16D; Singles draw – Doubles draw	(Finland) Veli Paloheimo; 3–6, 6–4, 6–4	(Sweden) Nicklas Kulti	(Finland) Olli Rahnasto (Sweden) Peter Nyborg	(United States) Mike Bauer (Finland) Pasi Virtanen (Sweden) Jan Apell (Finland) Aki Rahunen
November 7	Helsinki Challenger; Helsinki, Finland $25,000 – carpet (I) – 32S/16D; Singles draw – Doubles draw	(United States) Luke Jensen (United States) Peter Palandjian; 7–6, 3–6, 6–3	(West Germany) Jörg Müller (United Kingdom) James Turner	(Finland) Olli Rahnasto (Sweden) Peter Nyborg	(United States) Mike Bauer (Finland) Pasi Virtanen (Sweden) Jan Apell (Finland) Aki Rahunen
November 7	Guangzhou Challenger; Guangzhou, China $25,000 – hard – 32S/16D; Singles draw – Doubles draw	(South Korea) Roh Gap-taik; 7–5, 6–2	(Australia) Peter Carter	(South Korea) Kim Bong-soo (United Kingdom) Richard Whichello	(India) Srinivasan Vasudevan (China) Zhang Jiuhua (United States) Steve DeVries (Australia) Shane Barr
November 7	Guangzhou Challenger; Guangzhou, China $25,000 – hard – 32S/16D; Singles draw – Doubles draw	(United States) Steve DeVries (United States) John Sobel; 7–6, 4–6, 6–4	(United States) Joseph Russell (United Kingdom) Andrew Sproule	(South Korea) Kim Bong-soo (United Kingdom) Richard Whichello	(India) Srinivasan Vasudevan (China) Zhang Jiuhua (United States) Steve DeVries (Australia) Shane Barr
November 14	Brasília Challenger; Brasília, Brazil $75,000 – hard – 32S/16D; Singles draw – Doubles draw	(Brazil) Luiz Mattar; 3–6, 6–4, 7–5	(Spain) Javier Sánchez	(Brazil) Cássio Motta (Brazil) Danilo Marcelino	(Uruguay) Diego Pérez (Argentina) Roberto Azar (Brazil) Ivan Kley (Brazil) Mauro Menezes
November 14	Brasília Challenger; Brasília, Brazil $75,000 – hard – 32S/16D; Singles draw – Doubles draw	(Brazil) Danilo Marcelino (Brazil) Mauro Menezes; 4–6, 7–6, 7–5	(Brazil) Ricardo Acioly (Brazil) Dácio Campos	(Brazil) Cássio Motta (Brazil) Danilo Marcelino	(Uruguay) Diego Pérez (Argentina) Roberto Azar (Brazil) Ivan Kley (Brazil) Mauro Menezes
November 14	Mexico City Challenger; Mexico City, Mexico $25,000 – hard – 32S/16D; Singles draw – Doubles draw	(United States) Tom Mercer; 6–3, 6–4	(Australia) Peter Doohan	(Mexico) Agustín Moreno (Mexico) Luis Herrera	(Mexico) Norberto Mantinan (United States) Joey Blake (Argentina) Roberto Saad (United States) Bruce Man-Son-Hing
November 14	Mexico City Challenger; Mexico City, Mexico $25,000 – hard – 32S/16D; Singles draw – Doubles draw	(Australia) Peter Doohan (Australia) Michael Fancutt; 3–6, 6–4, 6–0	(United States) George Bezecny (United States) Tom Mercer	(Mexico) Agustín Moreno (Mexico) Luis Herrera	(Mexico) Norberto Mantinan (United States) Joey Blake (Argentina) Roberto Saad (United States) Bruce Man-Son-Hing
November 14	Strasbourg Challenger; Strasbourg, France $25,000 – clay (I) – 32S/16D; Singles draw – Doubles draw	(Socialist Federal Republic of Yugoslavia) Marko Ostoja; 6–2, 6–2	(Sweden) Tomas Nydahl	(France) Jérôme Potier (Czechoslovakia) Cyril Suk	(West Germany) Pavel Vojtíšek (Spain) Daniel Marco (Spain) Juan Carlos Báguena (France) Cédric Pioline
November 14	Strasbourg Challenger; Strasbourg, France $25,000 – clay (I) – 32S/16D; Singles draw – Doubles draw	(Spain) Juan Carlos Báguena (Spain) Borja Uribe; 6–4, 6-3	(West Germany) Pavel Vojtíšek (West Germany) Ivo Werner	(France) Jérôme Potier (Czechoslovakia) Cyril Suk	(West Germany) Pavel Vojtíšek (Spain) Daniel Marco (Spain) Juan Carlos Báguena (France) Cédric Pioline
November 14	Valkenswaard Challenger; Valkenswaard, The Netherlands $75,000 – carpet (I) – 32S/16D; Singles draw – Doubles draw	(Australia) Wally Masur; 7–6, 6–7, 7–5	(West Germany) Udo Riglewski	(Finland) Olli Rahnasto (Finland) Veli Paloheimo	(Austria) Alex Antonitsch (West Germany) Heiner Moraing (Czechoslovakia) Petr Korda (West Germany) Patrick Baur
November 14	Valkenswaard Challenger; Valkenswaard, The Netherlands $75,000 – carpet (I) – 32S/16D; Singles draw – Doubles draw	(West Germany) Patrick Baur (West Germany) Udo Riglewski; 3–6, 6–4, 6–3	(Poland) Wojciech Kowalski (West Germany) Christian Saceanu	(Finland) Olli Rahnasto (Finland) Veli Paloheimo	(Austria) Alex Antonitsch (West Germany) Heiner Moraing (Czechoslovakia) Petr Korda (West Germany) Patrick Baur
November 21	Cape Town Challenger; Cape Town, South Africa $75,000 – hard – 32S/16D; Singles draw – Doubles draw	(United States) Jimmy Arias; 6–4, 3–6, 7–6	(United States) Matt Anger	(South Africa) Wayne Ferreira (United Kingdom) Neil Broad	(United States) Tim Wilkison (South Africa) Kevin Moir (France) Thierry Tulasne (United States) Kevin Curren
November 21	Cape Town Challenger; Cape Town, South Africa $75,000 – hard – 32S/16D; Singles draw – Doubles draw	(United States) Matt Anger (United States) Greg Holmes; 6–2, 6-1	(South Africa) Royce Deppe (United States) Michael Kures	(South Africa) Wayne Ferreira (United Kingdom) Neil Broad	(United States) Tim Wilkison (South Africa) Kevin Moir (France) Thierry Tulasne (United States) Kevin Curren
November 21	Copenhagen Open; Copenhagen, Denmark $50,000 – carpet (I) – 32S/16D; Singles draw – Doubles draw	(United States) Derrick Rostagno; 6–3, 6–1	(Austria) Alex Antonitsch	(Finland) Olli Rahnasto (Sweden) Jan Gunnarsson	(Sweden) Nicklas Kulti (West Germany) Hans-Dieter Beutel (Finland) Veli Paloheimo (Sweden) Lars-Anders Wahlgren
November 21	Copenhagen Open; Copenhagen, Denmark $50,000 – carpet (I) – 32S/16D; Singles draw – Doubles draw	(Israel) Gilad Bloom (Poland) Wojciech Kowalski; 7–6, 7-5	(Denmark) Peter Bastiansen (Denmark) Peter Flintsø	(Finland) Olli Rahnasto (Sweden) Jan Gunnarsson	(Sweden) Nicklas Kulti (West Germany) Hans-Dieter Beutel (Finland) Veli Paloheimo (Sweden) Lars-Anders Wahlgren
November 21	Munich Challenger; Munich, West Germany $25,000 – carpet (I) – 32S/16D; Singles draw – Doubles draw	(Soviet Union) Alexander Volkov; 6–4, 6–3	(Socialist Federal Republic of Yugoslavia) Goran Prpić	(Sweden) Tomas Nydahl (Czechoslovakia) Jaroslav Bulant	(Czechoslovakia) Branislav Stankovič (West Germany) Martin Sinner (West Germany) Gerald Marzenell (Morocco) Khalid Outaleb
November 21	Munich Challenger; Munich, West Germany $25,000 – carpet (I) – 32S/16D; Singles draw – Doubles draw	(Socialist Federal Republic of Yugoslavia) Igor Flego (Socialist Federal Republic of Yugoslavia) Goran Ivanišević; 6–4, 6-4	(West Germany) Michael Stich (West Germany) Martin Sinner	(Sweden) Tomas Nydahl (Czechoslovakia) Jaroslav Bulant	(Czechoslovakia) Branislav Stankovič (West Germany) Martin Sinner (West Germany) Gerald Marzenell (Morocco) Khalid Outaleb
November 21	Tasmania Challenger; Tasmania, Australia $25,000 – carpet – 32S/16D; Singles draw – Doubles draw	(Australia) Todd Woodbridge; 6–3, 7–6	(Australia) Shane Barr	(Australia) Richard Fromberg (Australia) Johan Anderson	(Australia) Dane Nebel (Australia) Mark Kratzmann (Australia) Jamie Morgan (Australia) Richard Fricker
November 21	Tasmania Challenger; Tasmania, Australia $25,000 – carpet – 32S/16D; Singles draw – Doubles draw	(Australia) Charlton Eagle (Australia) Paul Mick; 7–6, 4–6, 7–6	(Australia) Shane Barr (Australia) Roger Rasheed	(Australia) Richard Fromberg (Australia) Johan Anderson	(Australia) Dane Nebel (Australia) Mark Kratzmann (Australia) Jamie Morgan (Australia) Richard Fricker
November 28	Brest Challenger; Brest, France $50,000 – hard (I) – 32S/16D; Singles draw – Doubles draw	(United States) Luke Jensen; 4–6, 6–3, 6–4	(France) Stéphane Grenier	(Ecuador) Hugo Núñez (Sweden) Thomas Högstedt	(Netherlands) Menno Oosting (France) Dominic Durand (France) Thierry Van Den Daele (Czechoslovakia) Libor Pimek
November 28	Brest Challenger; Brest, France $50,000 – hard (I) – 32S/16D; Singles draw – Doubles draw	(United States) John Letts (United States) Bruce Man-Son-Hing; 6–3, 6-3	(France) Thierry Champion (France) François Errard	(Ecuador) Hugo Núñez (Sweden) Thomas Högstedt	(Netherlands) Menno Oosting (France) Dominic Durand (France) Thierry Van Den Daele (Czechoslovakia) Libor Pimek
November 28	Durban Challenger; Durban, South Africa $25,000 – hard – 32S/16D; Singles draw – Doubles draw	(South Africa) Gary Muller; 6–3, 7–5	(South Africa) Royce Deppe	(South Africa) Barry Moir (United States) Tim Wilkison	(Italy) Francesco Cancellotti (United States) Michael Robertson (South Africa) Lan Bale (Italy) Michele Fioroni
November 28	Durban Challenger; Durban, South Africa $25,000 – hard – 32S/16D; Singles draw – Doubles draw	(United States) Michael Robertson (United States) Tim Wilkison; 6–2, 6-2	(South Africa) Wayne Ferreira (South Africa) Grant Stafford	(South Africa) Barry Moir (United States) Tim Wilkison	(Italy) Francesco Cancellotti (United States) Michael Robertson (South Africa) Lan Bale (Italy) Michele Fioroni
November 28	Ogbe Challenger; Ogbe, Nigeria $25,000 – hard – 32S/16D; Singles draw – Doubles draw	(France) Jean-Philippe Fleurian; 6–3, 6–3	(Nigeria) Nduka Odizor	(India) Srinivasan Vasudevan (United Kingdom) Chris Bailey	(United Kingdom) Danny Sapsford (United States) Jeff Klaparda (United States) John Schmitt (United States) Phil Williamson
November 28	Ogbe Challenger; Ogbe, Nigeria $25,000 – hard – 32S/16D; Singles draw – Doubles draw	(France) Jean-Philippe Fleurian (Nigeria) Nduka Odizor; 6–4, 6-2	(West Germany) Frank Rieker (United States) John Schmitt	(India) Srinivasan Vasudevan (United Kingdom) Chris Bailey	(United Kingdom) Danny Sapsford (United States) Jeff Klaparda (United States) John Schmitt (United States) Phil Williamson
November 28	São Paulo-4 Challenger; São Paulo, Brazil $25,000 – clay – 32S/16D; Singles draw – Doubles draw	(Brazil) Cássio Motta; 6–2, 6–2	(Argentina) Guillermo Rivas	(Argentina) Roberto Argüello (Argentina) Francisco Yunis	(Brazil) Júlio Góes (Brazil) Dácio Campos (Argentina) Pablo Albano (Brazil) Fernando Roese
November 28	São Paulo-4 Challenger; São Paulo, Brazil $25,000 – clay – 32S/16D; Singles draw – Doubles draw	(Brazil) Givaldo Barbosa (Brazil) Ricardo Camargo; 6–7, 7–6, 6–4	(Argentina) Pablo Albano (Brazil) César Kist	(Argentina) Roberto Argüello (Argentina) Francisco Yunis	(Brazil) Júlio Góes (Brazil) Dácio Campos (Argentina) Pablo Albano (Brazil) Fernando Roese

=== December ===
Week of	Tournament	Champions	Runners-up	Semifinalists	Quarterfinalists
December 5	Bancolombia Open; Bogotá, Colombia $25,000 – clay – 32S/16D; Singles draw – Doubles draw	(Argentina) Gustavo Giussani; 7–6, 5–7, 6–4	(Argentina) Christian Miniussi	(Argentina) Gerardo Mirad (Peru) Alejandro Aramburú	(Argentina) Pablo Albano (Colombia) Jaime Cortés (Colombia) Mauricio Hadad (Argentina) Gustavo Guerrero
December 5	Bancolombia Open; Bogotá, Colombia $25,000 – clay – 32S/16D; Singles draw – Doubles draw	(Argentina) Fabián Blengino (Argentina) Gustavo Giussani; 6–4, 1–6, 7–6	(Argentina) Guillermo Minutella (Argentina) Gerardo Mirad	(Argentina) Gerardo Mirad (Peru) Alejandro Aramburú	(Argentina) Pablo Albano (Colombia) Jaime Cortés (Colombia) Mauricio Hadad (Argentina) Gustavo Guerrero
December 5	Cascais Challenger; Cascais, Portugal $75,000 – carpet (I) – 32S/16D; Singles draw – Doubles draw	(Argentina) Eduardo Masso; 4-1, Ret.	(Sweden) Thomas Haldin	(Italy) Gianluca Pozzi (West Germany) Michael Westphal	(Belgium) Xavier Daufresne (United Kingdom) Andrew Castle (Sweden) Thomas Högstedt (West Germany) Gerald Marzenell
December 5	Cascais Challenger; Cascais, Portugal $75,000 – carpet (I) – 32S/16D; Singles draw – Doubles draw	(Sweden) Ronnie Båthman (Sweden) Rikard Bergh; 3–6, 6–4, 6–4	(United Kingdom) Andrew Castle (Netherlands) Menno Oosting	(Italy) Gianluca Pozzi (West Germany) Michael Westphal	(Belgium) Xavier Daufresne (United Kingdom) Andrew Castle (Sweden) Thomas Högstedt (West Germany) Gerald Marzenell
December 5	Münster Challenger; Münster, West Germany $75,000 – carpet (I) – 32S/16D; Singles draw – Doubles draw	(West Germany) Michael Stich; 6–3, 6–3	(Soviet Union) Alexander Volkov	(Sweden) Jan Gunnarsson (France) Olivier Delaître	(United States) Scott Davis (West Germany) Hans-Dieter Beutel (Iran) Mansour Bahrami (West Germany) Christian Saceanu
December 5	Münster Challenger; Münster, West Germany $75,000 – carpet (I) – 32S/16D; Singles draw – Doubles draw	(Soviet Union) Andrei Olhovskiy (Soviet Union) Alexander Volkov; 6–2, 6-0	(Switzerland) Rolf Hertzog (Socialist Federal Republic of Yugoslavia) Goran Prpić	(Sweden) Jan Gunnarsson (France) Olivier Delaître	(United States) Scott Davis (West Germany) Hans-Dieter Beutel (Iran) Mansour Bahrami (West Germany) Christian Saceanu
December 5	Okada Challenger; Okada, Nigeria $50,000 – hard – 32S/16D; Singles draw – Doubles draw	(France) Jean-Philippe Fleurian; 6–3, 7–6	(Nigeria) Nduka Odizor	(United Kingdom) Stephen Botfield (Nigeria) Sadiq Abdullahi	(United Kingdom) Danny Sapsford (United Kingdom) Chris Bailey (United Kingdom) Ulli Nganga (United Kingdom) Mark Petchey
December 5	Okada Challenger; Okada, Nigeria $50,000 – hard – 32S/16D; Singles draw – Doubles draw	(France) Jean-Philippe Fleurian (Nigeria) Nduka Odizor; 6–3, 6–7, 6–3	(India) Srinivasan Vasudevan (Switzerland) Marc Walder	(United Kingdom) Stephen Botfield (Nigeria) Sadiq Abdullahi	(United Kingdom) Danny Sapsford (United Kingdom) Chris Bailey (United Kingdom) Ulli Nganga (United Kingdom) Mark Petchey
December 12	Sofia Challenger; Sofia, Bulgaria $25,000 – carpet (I) – 32S/16D; Singles draw – Doubles draw	(Netherlands) Johan Vekemans; 7–5, 7–6	(Czechoslovakia) Jaroslav Bulant	(Sweden) Peter Nyborg (Soviet Union) Ģirts Dzelde	(Bulgaria) Ruslan Rainov (Austria) Thomas Buchmayer (Romania) Adrian Marcu (Sweden) Fredrik Perman
December 12	Sofia Challenger; Sofia, Bulgaria $25,000 – carpet (I) – 32S/16D; Singles draw – Doubles draw	(Romania) Adrian Marcu (Romania) Florin Segărceanu; 7–5, 6-2	(Czechoslovakia) Jaroslav Bulant (Czechoslovakia) Richard Vogel	(Sweden) Peter Nyborg (Soviet Union) Ģirts Dzelde	(Bulgaria) Ruslan Rainov (Austria) Thomas Buchmayer (Romania) Adrian Marcu (Sweden) Fredrik Perman

== Statistical information ==
These tables present the number of singles (S) and doubles (D) titles won by each player and each nation during the season, within all the tournament categories of the 1988 ATP Challenger Series. The players/nations are sorted by: (1) total number of titles (a doubles title won by two players representing the same nation counts as only one win for the nation); (2) a singles > doubles hierarchy; (3) alphabetical order (by family names for players).

=== Titles won by player ===
Total	Player	S	D
6	Josef Čihák (TCH)	2	4
5	Jean-Philippe Fleurian (FRA)	2	3
4	Neil Broad (GBR)	2	2
4	Danilo Marcelino (BRA)	2	2
4	Ronnie Båthman (SWE)	1	3
4	Cyril Suk (TCH)	0	4
3	Gustavo Giussani (ARG)	2	1
3	Peter Doohan (AUS)	1	2
3	Luke Jensen (USA)	1	2
3	Mark Koevermans (NED)	1	2
3	Mauro Menezes (BRA)	1	2
3	Brad Pearce (USA)	1	2
3	Udo Riglewski (FRG)	1	2
3	Michael Stich (FRG)	1	2
3	Jörgen Windahl (SWE)	1	2
3	Todd Woodbridge (AUS)	1	2
3	Givaldo Barbosa (BRA)	0	3
3	Ricardo Camargo (BRA)	0	3
3	João Cunha e Silva (POR)	0	3
3	Igor Flego (YUG)	0	3
3	Nduka Odizor (NGR)	0	3
3	Peter Palandjian (USA)	0	3
2	Jordi Arrese (ESP)	2	0
2	Paolo Canè (ITA)	2	0
2	Massimo Cierro (ITA)	2	0
2	Alberto Mancini (ARG)	2	0
2	Luiz Mattar (BRA)	2	0
2	Barry Moir (RSA)	2	0
2	Cássio Motta (BRA)	2	0
2	Olli Rahnasto (FIN)	2	0
2	Javier Sánchez (ESP)	2	0
2	Roland Stadler (SUI)	2	0
2	Pieter Aldrich (RSA)	1	1
2	Matt Anger (USA)	1	1
2	Patrick Baur (FRG)	1	1
2	Gilad Bloom (ISR)	1	1
2	Jaroslav Bulant (TCH)	1	1
2	Conny Falk (SWE)	1	1
2	Nick Fulwood (GBR)	1	1
2	Steve Guy (NZL)	1	1
2	Per Henricsson (SWE)	1	1
2	Glenn Layendecker (USA)	1	1
2	Eduardo Masso (ARG)	1	1
2	Veli Paloheimo (FIN)	1	1
2	Raúl Viver (ECU)	1	1
2	Alexander Volkov (URS)	1	1
2	Ricardo Acuña (CHI)	0	2
2	Christer Allgårdh (SWE)	0	2
2	Jan Apell (SWE)	0	2
2	Rikard Bergh (SWE)	0	2
2	Shelby Cannon (USA)	0	2
2	Morten Christensen (DEN)	0	2
2	Nevio Devide (ITA)	0	2
2	Michael Fancutt (AUS)	0	2
2	Jeff Klaparda (USA)	0	2
2	Wojciech Kowalski (POL)	0	2
2	Stefan Kruger (RSA)	0	2
2	John Letts (USA)	0	2
2	Bruce Man-Son-Hing (USA)	0	2
2	Hugo Núñez (ECU)	0	2
2	Tim Pawsat (USA)	0	2
2	Martin Sinner (FRG)	0	2
2	Jason Stoltenberg (AUS)	0	2
2	Peter Svensson (SWE)	0	2
2	Torben Theine (FRG)	0	2
2	Greg Van Emburgh (USA)	0	2
2	Lars-Anders Wahlgren (SWE)	0	2
1	Vijay Amritraj (IND)	1	0
1	Alex Antonitsch (AUT)	1	0
1	Jimmy Arias (USA)	1	0
1	Shane Barr (AUS)	1	0
1	Hans-Dieter Beutel (FRG)	1	0
1	Omar Camporese (ITA)	1	0
1	Andrew Castle (GBR)	1	0
1	Jim Courier (USA)	1	0
1	Franco Davín (ARG)	1	0
1	Scott Davis (USA)	1	0
1	Paul Dogger (NED)	1	0
1	Lawson Duncan (USA)	1	0
1	Marcelo Filippini (URU)	1	0
1	Javier Frana (ARG)	1	0
1	Roh Gap-taik (KOR)	1	0
1	Wally Masur (AUS)	1	0
1	Tom Mercer (USA)	1	0
1	Gary Muller (RSA)	1	0
1	Tom Nijssen (NED)	1	0
1	Karel Nováček (TCH)	1	0
1	Bruno Orešar (YUG)	1	0
1	Eduardo Osta (ESP)	1	0
1	Marko Ostoja (YUG)	1	0
1	Claudio Panatta (ITA)	1	0
1	Markus Rackl (FRG)	1	0
1	Guillermo Rivas (ARG)	1	0
1	Francisco Roig (ESP)	1	0
1	Derrick Rostagno (USA)	1	0
1	Jonathan Stark (USA)	1	0
1	Andrew Sznajder (CAN)	1	0
1	Jeff Tarango (USA)	1	0
1	Gerardo Vacarezza (CHI)	1	0
1	Johan Vekemans (NED)	1	0
1	Eduardo Vélez (MEX)	1	0
1	Andres Võsand (URS)	1	0
1	Laurie Warder (AUS)	1	0
1	Paul Wekesa (KEN)	1	0
1	Pablo Albano (ARG)	0	1
1	Juan Carlos Báguena (ESP)	0	1
1	Julian Barham (USA)	0	1
1	Mark Basham (USA)	0	1
1	Rill Baxter (USA)	0	1
1	Jaromir Becka (FRG)	0	1
1	Charles Beckman (USA)	0	1
1	Fabián Blengino (ARG)	0	1
1	Dácio Campos (BRA)	0	1
1	Simone Colombo (ITA)	0	1
1	Bud Cox (USA)	0	1
1	Joe DeFoor (USA)	0	1
1	Alessandro de Minicis (ITA)	0	1
1	Mike De Palmer (USA)	0	1
1	Royce Deppe (RSA)	0	1
1	Bruce Derlin (NZL)	0	1
1	Steve DeVries (USA)	0	1
1	Gary Donnelly (USA)	0	1
1	David Dowlen (USA)	0	1
1	Charlton Eagle (AUS)	0	1
1	Howard Endelman (USA)	0	1
1	Buff Farrow (USA)	0	1
1	David Felgate (GBR)	0	1
1	Vojtěch Flégl (TCH)	0	1
1	Marcel Freeman (USA)	0	1
1	Shlomo Glickstein (ISR)	0	1
1	Jim Gurfein (USA)	0	1
1	Marcelo Hennemann (BRA)	0	1
1	Luis Herrera (MEX)	0	1
1	Alexandre Hocevar (BRA)	0	1
1	Marcos Hocevar (BRA)	0	1
1	Greg Holmes (USA)	0	1
1	David Ison (GBR)	0	1
1	Goran Ivanišević (YUG)	0	1
1	Damir Keretić (FRG)	0	1
1	Ivan Kley (BRA)	0	1
1	Petr Korda (TCH)	0	1
1	Paul Kronk (AUS)	0	1
1	Denis Langaskens (BEL)	0	1
1	Andreas Lesch (FRG)	0	1
1	Denys Maasdorp (RSA)	0	1
1	David Macpherson (AUS)	0	1
1	Adrian Marcu (ROU)	0	1
1	Stephan Medem (SUI)	0	1
1	Stefano Mezzadri (SUI)	0	1
1	Paul Mick (AUS)	0	1
1	Tony Mmoh (NGR)	0	1
1	Diego Nargiso (ITA)	0	1
1	Peter Nyborg (SWE)	0	1
1	Andrei Olhovskiy (URS)	0	1
1	Javier Ordaz (MEX)	0	1
1	Diego Pérez (URU)	0	1
1	Shahar Perkiss (ISR)	0	1
1	Gavin Pfitzner (AUS)	0	1
1	Jean-Marc Piacentile (FRA)	0	1
1	Michael Robertson (USA)	0	1
1	Fernando Roese (BRA)	0	1
1	Michiel Schapers (NED)	0	1
1	Florin Segărceanu (ROU)	0	1
1	John Sobel (USA)	0	1
1	Branislav Stankovič (TCH)	0	1
1	Stefan Svensson (SWE)	0	1
1	Michael Tauson (DEN)	0	1
1	Borja Uribe (ESP)	0	1
1	Nicklas Utgren (SWE)	0	1
1	Huub van Boeckel (NED)	0	1
1	Richard Whichello (GBR)	0	1
1	Tim Wilkison (USA)	0	1
1	Éric Winogradsky (FRA)	0	1
1	Peter Wright (USA)	0	1
1	Simon Youl (AUS)	0	1

=== Titles won by nation ===
Total	Nation	S	D
35	United States (USA)	12	23
17	Sweden (SWE)	4	13
16	Brazil (BRA)	7	9
13	Australia (AUS)	5	8
12	West Germany (FRG)	5	7
11	Argentina (ARG)	8	3
11	Czechoslovakia (TCH)	4	7
10	Italy (ITA)	6	4
9	South Africa (RSA)	4	5
8	Great Britain (GBR)	4	4
7	Spain (ESP)	6	1
7	Netherlands (NED)	4	3
7	France (FRA)	2	5
5	Yugoslavia (YUG)	2	3
4	Finland (FIN)	3	1
4	Switzerland (SUI)	2	2
4	Nigeria (NGR)	0	4
3	Soviet Union (URS)	2	1
3	Chile (CHI)	1	2
3	Ecuador (ECU)	1	2
3	Israel (ISR)	1	2
3	New Zealand (NZL)	1	2
3	Portugal (POR)	0	3
2	Mexico (MEX)	1	1
2	Uruguay (URU)	1	1
2	Denmark (DEN)	0	2
2	Poland (POL)	0	2
1	Austria (AUT)	1	0
1	Canada (CAN)	1	0
1	India (IND)	1	0
1	Kenya (KEN)	1	0
1	South Korea (KOR)	1	0
1	Belgium (BEL)	0	1
1	Romania (ROU)	0	1

== See also ==
- 1988 Grand Prix
- Association of Tennis Professionals
- International Tennis Federation
