= Peter Svensson (tennis) =

Swedish tennis player

- Full name: Peter Svensson
- Country (sports): Sweden
- Born: 6 January 1961 (age 64) Ängelholm, Sweden
- Plays: Left-handed
- Prize money: $57,659

Singles
- Career record: 1–1
- Career titles: 0
- Highest ranking: No. 247 (26 November 1984)

Doubles
- Career record: 19–34
- Career titles: 0
- Highest ranking: No. 77 (7 August 1989)

Grand Slam doubles results
- Australian Open: 1R (1990)

Peter Svensson (born 6 January 1961) is a former professional tennis player from Sweden.

== Biography ==
Svensson received a tennis scholarship to attend the University of Arkansas at Little Rock, after which he completed an MBA at the University of Texas at Tyler.

Most of his top level tour matches were in doubles, in which he was ranked as high as 77 in the world. He had his best year in 1985 when he made the semi-finals of five Grand Prix tournaments. During his career he won a total of seven Challenger doubles titles.

As a singles player he reached two Challenger finals and competed in the 1988 Swedish Open, held in Bastad. He defeated Branislav Stankovič in the first round, then lost in the second round to Niclas Kroon.

One of his doubles partners was Stefan Edberg, who he teamed up with at Basel in both 1988 and 1989.

His only Grand Slam appearance came at the 1990 Australian Open where he teamed up with Ronnie Båthman.

He now lives in Switzerland and is an executive with Nestlé. Two sons, Filip and Viktor, played collegiate tennis in the United States.

== Challenger titles ==
=== Doubles: (7) ===
No.	Year	Tournament	Surface	Partner	Opponents	Score
1.	1984	Travemünde, West Germany	Clay	(Sweden) Johan Carlsson	(Socialist Federal Republic of Yugoslavia) Igor Flego (Israel) Shahar Perkiss	5–7, 6–4, 6–2
2.	1985	Bergen, Norway	Clay	(Sweden) Jonas Svensson	(Sweden) Stefan Eriksson (Sweden) Peter Lundgren	7–6, 4–6, 6–3
3.	1988	Crans Montana, Switzerland	Clay	(Sweden) Lars-Anders Wahlgren	(Sweden) Conny Falk (Sweden) Stefan Svensson	6–4, 6–4
4.	1988	Genoa, Italy	Clay	(Sweden) Lars-Anders Wahlgren	(Sweden) Per Henricsson (Sweden) Nicklas Utgren	7–5, 2–6, 6–1
5.	1989	Hossegor, France	Clay	(Sweden) Jörgen Windahl	(Sweden) David Engel (South Africa) Barry Moir	6–4, 7–5
6.	1989	Clermont Ferrand, France	Clay	(Sweden) Lars-Anders Wahlgren	(Argentina) Marcelo Ingaramo (Argentina) Gustavo Luza	7–5, 6–3
7.	1989	Tampere, Finland	Clay	(Sweden) Lars-Anders Wahlgren	(Sweden) Christer Allgårdh (Sweden) Tobias Svantesson	7–5, 6–7, 6–3
