= Joe DeFoor =

American tennis player

- Country (sports): United States
- Born: February 2, 1963 (age 62); Marietta, Georgia, U.S.
- Height: 6 ft 2 in (188 cm)
- Prize money: $12,905

Singles
- Career record: 0–1
- Highest ranking: No. 437 (Mar 23, 1987)

Doubles
- Career record: 1–6
- Highest ranking: No. 223 (Nov 7, 1988)

Grand Slam doubles results
- Wimbledon: Q2 (1989)

Joe DeFoor (born February 2, 1963) is an American former professional tennis player.

Born and raised in Marietta, Georgia, DeFoor played collegiate tennis for Clemson University and was an All-SEC selection in 1985. Following his time at Clemson he competed on the professional tour, reaching best rankings of 437 in singles and 223 in doubles. He was a doubles quarter-finalist at the 1988 Livingston Open.

== ATP Challenger finals ==
=== Doubles: 1 (1–0) ===
Result	Date	Tournament	Surface	Partner	Opponents	Score
Win	Oct 1988	Coquitlam, Canada	Hard	(United States) Bruce Man-Son-Hing	(United States) Julian Barham (Republic of Ireland) Peter Wright	7–6, 7–6
