= Lochbihler =

Lochbihler is a surname. Notable people with the surname include:

- Jan Lochbihler (born 1992), Swiss sports shooter
- Stefan Lochbihler (born 1965), Austrian tennis player
