= Igor Flego =

- Full name: Igor Flego
- Country (sports): Yugoslavia
- Born: 13 December 1961 (age 63); Rijeka, Croatia, Yugoslavia
- Plays: Right-handed

Singles
- Career record: 1–3
- Career titles: 0
- Highest ranking: No. 261 (30 July 1984)

Doubles
- Career record: 5–11
- Career titles: 0
- Highest ranking: No. 176 (3 April 1989)

Grand Slam doubles results
- Australian Open: 2R (1989)

Igor Flego (born 13 December 1961) is a former professional tennis player from Croatia who represented Yugoslavia.

== Biography ==
Flego made his debut for the Yugoslavia Davis Cup team in 1986 as a member of the side which played a World Group Quarter-final tie against Czechoslovakia in Sarajevo. He played the doubles match with Slobodan Zivojinovic, which they lost, then went down to Miloslav Mečíř in a dead singles rubber.

In 1987 he appeared again in Davis Cup competition when he played a doubles match in Yugoslavia's World Group tie in Adelaide. He and partner Zivojinovic lost in four sets to the Australian pairing of Pat Cash and Peter Doohan.

He won all of his three Challenger doubles titles in 1988, with wins in Travemünde, Tampere and Munich.

At the 1989 Australian Open he managed to qualify for the main doubles draw, with Agustín Moreno as his partner. They made his past the first round by beating Germans Heiner Moraing and Torben Theine, then were eliminated in the second round by a seeding pairing, Gary Muller and Christo van Rensburg.

== Challenger titles ==
=== Doubles: (3) ===
No.	Year	Tournament	Surface	Partner	Opponents	Score
1.	1988	Travemünde, West Germany	Clay	(Netherlands) Mark Koevermans	(United States) Brett Dickinson (France) Jean-Marc Piacentile	6–4, 6–7, 6–3
2.	1988	Tampere, Finland	Clay	(Netherlands) Mark Koevermans	(Finland) Mika Hedman (Finland) Veli Paloheimo	6–4, 6–1
3.	1988	Munich, West Germany	Carpet	(Socialist Federal Republic of Yugoslavia) Goran Ivanišević	(West Germany) Martin Sinner (West Germany) Michael Stich	6–4, 6–4

== See also ==
- List of Yugoslavia Davis Cup team representatives
