= Andreas Lesch =

German tennis player

- Country (sports): West Germany; Germany
- Born: 4 January 1966 (age 59); Cologne, West Germany
- Height: 6 ft 5 in (196 cm)
- Plays: Left-handed

Singles
- Career record: 1-4
- Career titles: 0
- Highest ranking: No. 301 (14 Jun 1993)

Grand Slam singles results
- Wimbledon: 1R (1990)

Doubles
- Highest ranking: No. 284 (11 Jul 1988)

Andreas Lesch (born 4 January 1966) is a former professional tennis player from Germany.

== Career ==
Titles and achievements:

1984 North-Rhine-Westfalen state championships of school-teams (runner-up)

1984 North-Rhine-Westfalen state championships of club teams (winner)

1986 North-Rhine-Westfalen state championship men's singles (winner)

1987 German national men's singles championships (semi-final)

1988 ATP 250 Grand Prix Tournament Nice (France) men's singles (round of 16)

1988 German national men's doubles championships (runner-up with Dirk Leppen)

1988 ATP Challenger Thessaloniki men's singles (quarterfinal)

1988 ATP Challenger Parioli (winner with Torben Theine)

1989 ATP Challenger Heilbronn Doubles (semi-final with Wojtek Kowalski)

1989 ATP Tour 250 Grand Prix Rotterdam (qualified for main draw singles)

1989 ATP Tour 250 Grand Prix Gstaad (qualified for main draw singles)

1989 ATP Tour 250 Grand Prix Basel (qualified for main draw singles)

1990 ATP Challenger Heilbronn Doubles (runner-up with Axel Hornung)

1990 All England Championships Wimbledon men's singles (qualified for maindraw)

1993 ATP Satellite Tournament Poitiers (winner)

1993 ATP Satellite Tournament Compiegne (runner-up)

1993 ATP Satellite Tournament Esslingen (runner-up)

1993 ATP Satellite Series Germany II (winner doubles with Michael Geserer)

1993 German Bundesliga Team Champion with TK Grün-Weiss Mannheim

1994 ATP Satellite Series Germany II (winner doubles with Milan Palme)

Father, Manfred, is a sports television production manager (WDR, Sportschau) and mother Doris, is a musician (orchestra, Die Madämchen).

Andreas is married to Annette-Bauer Lesch. They have two children, Lara and Cedric.

In the 1988 Nice Open, Andreas Lesch had a win over top 70 player Darren Cahill which later in year defeated Boris Becker in the US Open. He lost

in the second round to Top 30 player Ronald Agenor. In Wimbledon 1990, the West German lost to Goran Ivanišević in straight sets in the opening round

of the 1990 Wimbledon Championships after he had beaten the multiple Wimbledon doubles champion Todd Woodbridge in 4 sets in the last round of the

qualification tournament.

In other ATP tour tournaments and in the german Tennis-Bundesliga Andreas Lesch was able to win against ATP top 100 players like Bernd Karbacher,

Marc-Kevin Göllner, Hansjörg Schwaier, Markus Zoecke, Karsten Braasch and others.

== Challenger titles ==
=== Doubles: (1) ===
No.	Year	Tournament	Surface	Partner	Opponents in the final	Score in the final
1.	1988	Parioli, Italy	Clay	(West Germany) Torben Theine	(Italy) Massimo Cierro (Italy) Alessandro De Minicis	6–3, 6–1
