= Torben Theine =

German tennis player

- Country (sports): West Germany
- Born: 10 July 1968 (age 56); Bad Oeynhausen, West Germany
- Height: 6 ft (183 cm)
- Turned pro: 1986
- Plays: Left-handed
- Prize money: $63,641

Singles
- Career record: 0-5
- Career titles: 0
- Highest ranking: No. 208 (20 Jun 1988)

Grand Slam singles results
- Australian Open: 1R (1988)

Doubles
- Career record: 0-10
- Career titles: 0
- Highest ranking: No. 219 (20 Jun 1988)

Grand Slam doubles results
- Australian Open: 1R (1988, 1989)
- Wimbledon: 1R (1990)

Torben Theine (born 10 July 1968) is a former professional tennis player from Germany.

== Career ==
Theine lost his only Grand Slam singles match, at the 1988 Australian Open, to American Paul Chamberlin. He also competed in the men's doubles, with Steve Shaw, but was unable to make it past the opening round. His two other Grand Slam appearances were both in the men's doubles, with Heiner Moraing at the 1989 Australian Open and Gavin Pfitzner at the 1990 Wimbledon Championships.

== Challenger titles ==
=== Doubles: (2) ===
No.	Year	Tournament	Surface	Partner	Opponents in the final	Score in the final
1.	1988	Graz, Austria	Hard	(South Africa) Denys Maasdorp	(Czechoslovakia) Stanislav Birner (Italy) Alessandro de Minicis	6–4, 6–4
2.	1988	Parioli, Italy	Clay	(West Germany) Andreas Lesch	(Italy) Massimo Cierro (Italy) Alessandro de Minicis	6–3, 6–1
