= Josef Čihák =

Czech tennis player (born 1963)

- Country (sports): Czechoslovakia
- Born: 19 March 1963 (age 63) Plzeň, Czechoslovakia
- Height: 1.85 m (6 ft 1 in)
- Turned pro: 1985
- Plays: Right-handed
- Prize money: $241,359

Singles
- Career record: 18–28
- Career titles: 0
- Highest ranking: No. 72 (19 October 1987)

Grand Slam singles results
- French Open: 1R (1988, 1989)
- Wimbledon: 1R (1988, 1989)

Doubles
- Career record: 49–58
- Career titles: 1
- Highest ranking: No. 57 (20 March 1989)

Grand Slam doubles results
- French Open: 2R (1988, 1989, 1990)
- Wimbledon: 2R (1989)

Josef Čihák (born 19 March 1963) is a former professional tennis player from the Czech Republic who competed for Czechoslovakia. He now works as a tennis coach at TK Sparta Prague.

== Career ==
Čihák was most successful as a doubles player, reaching two doubles finals in the 1989 Grand Prix, at Båstad and Saint-Vincent, winning the latter. He had previously made doubles semi-finals at Prague and Palermo in 1987 and also Prague and Munich in 1988. As well reaching those two finals in 1989, Čihák was also a semi-finalist at the Athens Open, in the singles.

At Grand Slam level he lost all of his four singles matches. The toughest opponent he came up against was Mats Wilander in the 1988 French Open, the number three seed who went on to win the tournament. He lost two five setters in 1989, at Roland Garros and Wimbledon. In doubles he won four of his 10 matches, but never made it past the second round, which he reached on four occasions, three times with countryman Cyril Suk as his partner.

== Grand Prix career finals ==
=== Doubles: 2 (1–1) ===
Result	W/L	Date	Tournament	Surface	Partner	Opponents	Score
Loss	0–1	Aug 1989	Båstad, Sweden	Clay	(Czechoslovakia) Karel Nováček	(Sweden) Per Henricsson (Sweden) Nicklas Utgren	5–7, 2–6
Win	1–1	Aug 1989	Saint-Vincent, Italy	Clay	(Czechoslovakia) Cyril Suk	(Italy) Massimo Cierro (Italy) Alessandro de Minicis	6–4, 6–2

== Challenger titles ==
=== Singles: (3) ===
No.	Year	Tournament	Surface	Opponent	Score
1.	1984	Bielefeld, West Germany	Clay	(West Germany) Peter Elter	6–2, 7–5
2.	1988	Pescara, Italy	Clay	(Chile) Gerardo Vacarezza	6–4, 6–3
3.	1988	Casablanca, Morocco	Clay	(Spain) David de Miguel	6–4, 6–2

=== Doubles: (11) ===
No.	Year	Tournament	Surface	Partner	Opponents	Score
1.	1985	Bahia, Brazil	Hard	(Netherlands) Tom Nijssen	(Spain) Emilio Sánchez (Paraguay) Víctor Pecci	6–4, 6–3
2.	1987	Budapest, Hungary	Clay	(Czechoslovakia) Cyril Suk	(Sweden) Christer Allgårdh (Sweden) David Engel	6–2, 7–6
3.	1988	Cairo, Egypt	Clay	(Czechoslovakia) Cyril Suk	(Argentina) Roberto Argüello (Argentina) Marcelo Ingaramo	6–3, 6–2
4.	1988	Agadir, Morocco	Clay	(Czechoslovakia) Cyril Suk	(Spain) José López-Maeso (Spain) Alberto Tous	6–2, 6–2
5.	1988	San Marino	Clay	(Sweden) Christer Allgårdh	(Portugal) João Cunha e Silva (Sweden) Jörgen Windahl	6–4, 6–2
6.	1988	Casablanca, Morocco	Clay	(Czechoslovakia) Cyril Suk	(France) Arnaud Boetsch (Belgium) Denis Langaskens	6–2, 6–0
7.	1989	Casablanca, Morocco	Clay	(Netherlands) Mark Koevermans	(Argentina) Marcelo Ingaramo (Argentina) Christian Miniussi	6–4, 6–4
8.	1989	Agadir, Morocco	Clay	(Czechoslovakia) Cyril Suk	(United States) Brett Dickinson (Sweden) Jörgen Windahl	6–3, 6–3
9.	1990	Agadir, Morocco	Clay	(Czechoslovakia) Cyril Suk	(Italy) Omar Camporese (Italy) Diego Nargiso	W/O
10.	1991	Porto, Portugal	Clay	(Czechoslovakia) Tomáš Anzari	(Spain) Juan Carlos Báguena (Ecuador) Andrés Gómez	7–5, 6–2
11.	1991	Pescara, Italy	Clay	(Czechoslovakia) Tomáš Anzari	(Sweden) Johan Donar (United States) John Sobel	6–3, 6–4
