= ATP Saint-Vincent =

Defunct tennis tournament
- Event name: Campionati Internazionali Della Valle D'Aosta
- Tour: Grand Prix circuit
- Founded: 1986
- Abolished: 1989
- Editions: 4
- Location: Saint-Vincent, Italy
- Surface: Clay / outdoor

The ATP Saint-Vincent, also known as the Campionati Internazionali della Valle D'Aosta, was a men's tennis tournament played in Saint-Vincent, Italy. It was played from 1986 until 1989 on outdoor clay courts and was part of the Grand Prix tennis circuit. In 1990 the tournament was succeeded by the Sanremo Open.

== Finals ==
=== Singles ===
Year	Champions	Runners-up	Score
1986	(Italy) Simone Colombo	(Australia) Paul McNamee	2–6, 6–3, 7–6
1987	(Chile) Pedro Rebolledo	(Italy) Francesco Cancellotti	7–6, 4–6, 6–3
1988	(Sweden) Kent Carlsson	(France) Thierry Champion	6–0, 6–2
1989	(Argentina) Franco Davín	(Spain) Juan Aguilera	6–2, 6–2

=== Doubles ===
Year	Champions	Runners-up	Score
1986	(Belgium) Libor Pimek (Czechoslovakia) Pavel Složil	(United States) Bud Cox (Australia) Michael Fancutt	6–3, 6–3
1987	(United States) Bud Cox (Australia) Michael Fancutt	(Italy) Massimo Cierro (Italy) Alessandro De Minicis	6–3, 6–4
1988	(Argentina) Alberto Mancini (Argentina) Christian Miniussi	(Italy) Paolo Canè (Hungary) Balázs Taróczy	6–4, 5–7, 6–3
1989	(Czechoslovakia) Josef Čihák (Czechoslovakia) Cyril Suk	(Italy) Massimo Cierro (Italy) Alessandro De Minicis	6–4, 6–2

== See also ==
- Valle d'Aosta Open – challenger tournament
