= Parioli Challenger =

Defunct tennis tournament
- Location: Parioli, Italy
- Category: ATP Challenger (1979–1993)
- Surface: Clay
- Website: Tennis Club Parioli

The Parioli Challenger was a professional tennis tournament in Italy played on clay courts that was part of the ATP Challenger Series. It was held annually in Parioli, Rome from 1979 to 1993. It was the successor tournament to the Torneo Internazionale di Tennis Parioli (1949–1973).

== Past finals ==
=== Singles ===
Year	Champion	Runner-up	Score
1979	(France) Dominique Bedel	(Italy) Corrado Barazzutti	6–4, 7–5
1980	(Italy) Corrado Barazzutti	(France) Dominique Bedel	1–6, 6–3, 6–2
1981	(Chile) Alejandro Pierola	(Italy) Corrado Barazzutti	6–4, 3–6, 6–4
1982	(Italy) Corrado Barazzutti	(Argentina) Alejandro Ganzábal	6–3, 2–6, 6–1
1983	(United States) Jimmy Brown	(Italy) Corrado Barazzutti	6–1, 6–2
1984	(Australia) John Frawley	(Argentina) Francisco Yunis	6–4, 7–5
1985	(Argentina) Guillermo Rivas	(Italy) Simone Colombo	7–6, 1–6, 7–6
1986	(Italy) Simone Colombo	(Sweden) Jörgen Windahl	6–4, 6–2
1987	(Peru) Carlos di Laura	(Argentina) Guillermo Pérez Roldán	6–3, 6–2
1988	(Italy) Massimo Cierro	(Sweden) Thomas Haldin	6–1, 6–1
1989	(Italy) Stefano Pescosolido	(Austria) Oliver Fuchs	6–1, 6–2
1990	(Spain) Fernando Luna	(Sweden) Magnus Larsson	6–3, 4–6, 6–4
1991	(Italy) Stefano Pescosolido	(Belgium) Bart Wuyts	6–3, 6–4
1992	(Argentina) Franco Davín	(Spain) Francisco Roig	6–1, 6–4
1993	(Italy) Vincenzo Santopadre	(Italy) Massimo Valeri	7–6, 3–6, 6–4

=== Doubles ===
Year	Champions	Runners-up	Score
1979	(Australia) Phil Dent (Australia) Dick Crealy	(Australia) Syd Ball (Australia) Kim Warwick	6–3, 3–6, 7–6
1980	(West Germany) Klaus Eberhard (West Germany) Ulrich Marten	(West Germany) Karl Meiler (West Germany) Werner Zirngibl	3–6, 6–3, 7–5
1981	(France) Henri Leconte (France) Gilles Moretton	(Romania) Florin Segărceanu (United States) Ben Testerman	6–4, 6–3
1982	(Chile) Iván Camus (Spain) Gabriel Urpí	(Argentina) Guillermo Aubone (Peru) Fernando Maynetto	3–6, 6–4, 6–3
1983	(Brazil) Givaldo Barbosa (Brazil) Ney Keller	(Italy) Gianni Marchetti (Italy) Enzo Vattuone	6–3, 6–2
1984	(Italy) Simone Colombo (Italy) Gianni Ocleppo	(Australia) John Frawley (Netherlands) Michiel Schapers	4–6, 6–4, 6–3
1985	(Switzerland) Claudio Mezzadri (Italy) Patrizio Parrini	(Italy) Paolo Canè (Italy) Simone Colombo	6–4, 3–6, 6–4
1986	(Italy) Paolo Canè (Italy) Simone Colombo	(Switzerland) Stephan Medem (Switzerland) Dominik Utzinger	6–1, 6–4
1987	(United States) Mark Basham (United States) Brett Buffington	(Italy) Massimo Cierro (Italy) Alessandro de Minicis	4–6, 6–2, 6–1
1988	(West Germany) Andreas Lesch (West Germany) Torben Theine	(Italy) Massimo Cierro (Italy) Alessandro de Minicis	6–3, 6–1
1989	(Italy) Massimo Cierro (Italy) Alessandro de Minicis	(Italy) Enrico Cocchi (Italy) Francesco Pisilli	6–4, 6–1
1990	(Czechoslovakia) Branislav Stankovič (Czechoslovakia) Richard Vogel	(Italy) Nicola Bruno (Italy) Stefano Pescosolido	7–5, 6–3
1991	(Spain) Marcos Górriz (Soviet Union) Andrei Olhovskiy	(Czechoslovakia) Martin Damm (Czechoslovakia) David Rikl	7–5, 2–6, 6–2
1992	(United States) Shelby Cannon (United States) Greg Van Emburgh	(Argentina) Luis Lobo (Argentina) Daniel Orsanic	7–6, 6–4
1993	(Italy) Cristian Brandi (Italy) Federico Mordegan	(United Kingdom) Sean Cole (Australia) Jon Ireland	6–3, 7–5
