= Michael Fancutt =

Australian tennis player

- Country (sports): Australia
- Born: 20 February 1961 (age 65) Brisbane, Australia
- Height: 6 ft 3 in (191 cm)
- Plays: Right-handed
- Prize money: $73,820

Singles
- Career record: 0–5
- Highest ranking: No. 361 (4 January 1982)

Grand Slam singles results
- Australian Open: 1R (1984)
- Wimbledon: 1R (1982)

Doubles
- Career record: 46–66
- Career titles: 1
- Highest ranking: No. 36 (30 July 1984)

Grand Slam doubles results
- Australian Open: SF (1984)
- French Open: 2R (1984, 1986)
- Wimbledon: SF (1984)
- US Open: 2R (1984)

Michael Fancutt (born 20 February 1961) is a former professional tennis player and coach from Australia. From 1998 to 2004, he coached the University of Tennessee tennis team.

During his career, Fancutt won one doubles title. He achieved a career-high doubles ranking of world No. 36 in 1984.

== Career finals ==
=== Doubles (1 title, 2 runner-ups) ===
Result	W/L	Date	Tournament	Surface	Partner	Opponents	Score
Loss	0–1	Jul 1984	Hilversum, Netherlands	Clay	(Australia) Broderick Dyke	(Sweden) Anders Järryd (Czechoslovakia) Tomáš Šmíd	4–6, 7–5, 6–7
Loss	0–2	Aug 1986	Saint-Vincent, Italy	Clay	(United States) Charles Bud Cox	(Czechoslovakia) Libor Pimek (Czechoslovakia) Pavel Složil	3–6, 3–6
Win	1–2	Aug 1987	Saint-Vincent, Italy	Clay	(United States) Charles Bud Cox	(Italy) Massimo Cierro (Italy) Alessandro De Minicis	6–3, 6–4
