= Thomas Haldin =

Swedish tennis player

- Country (sports): Sweden
- Born: 11 July 1965 (age 59); Jönköping, Sweden
- Height: 1.85 m (6 ft 1 in)
- Turned pro: 1987
- Plays: Right-handed
- Prize money: $57,174

Singles
- Career record: 2–11
- Career titles: 0
- Highest ranking: No. 138 (24 Jul 1989)

Grand Slam singles results
- Wimbledon: Q1 (1990)

Doubles
- Career record: 0–1
- Career titles: 0
- Highest ranking: No. 699 (10 Sep 1990)

Thomas Haldin (born 11 July 1965) is a former professional tennis player from Sweden.

== Career ==
Haldin made his ATP singles main draw debut at the 1987 Swedish Open as a qualifier, losing in the second round to world number 3 and second seed Stefan Edberg.

The Swede played mostly on the Challenger tour level and reached two finals.

Haldin has a career high ATP singles ranking of 138 achieved on 24 July 1989.

== Challenger finals ==
=== Singles: 2 (0–2) ===
Result	No.	Year	Tournament	Surface	Opponent	Score
Loss	1.	1988	Parioli Challenger, Parioli, Italy	Clay	(Italy) Massimo Cierro	1–6, 1–6
Loss	2.	1988	Cascais Challenger, Cascais, Portugal	Carpet	(Argentina) Eduardo Masso	1–4 RET
