= Ugo Colombini =

Italian tennis player

- Full name: Ugo Colombini
- Country (sports): Italy
- Born: 7 October 1967 (age 57); Melzo, Italy
- Prize money: $81,537

Singles
- Career record: 0–2
- Career titles: 0
- Highest ranking: No. 274 (11 February 1991)

Doubles
- Career record: 10–22
- Career titles: 0
- Highest ranking: No. 137 (6 March 1989)

Grand Slam doubles results
- French Open: 2R (1989)
- Wimbledon: 1R (1989)

Mixed doubles

Grand Slam mixed doubles results
- Wimbledon: 2R (1991)

Ugo Colombini (born 7 October 1967) is a former professional tennis player and sports agent from Italy.

== Biography ==
=== Professional tour ===
Colombini, who comes from Milan, turned professional in 1986.

Early in his career he appeared in the main draw of Grand Prix (ATP) tournaments in Bari and Milan, but primarily featured on tour as a doubles player. He did however continue to play singles on the Challenger tour, a career which included a win over then world number 22 Darren Cahill in Cape Town and a title win in Nigeria.

In 1989 he had his best year on the doubles circuit, he won a Challenger title in Dublin, made the second round of the French Open and reached Grand Prix semi-finals in Nancy and St. Vincent. He twice competed at the Wimbledon Championships, in the men's doubles in 1989 and mixed doubles in 1991.

=== Player agent ===
Colombini is now a successful player agent who have been involved with high profile players including Juan Martin del Potro and Andy Murray. He began this career in 2000 at Florida sports agency Sports Marketing Consultants then later became an independent agent.

Del Potro was aged 12 when he was talent spotted by Colombini, who signed the Argentine player. He struck sponsorship deals for del Potro with Nike and Wilson. When del Potro won the 2009 US Open, Colombini was one of the few people in his player's box. He has remained with del Potro despite being a stand-along agent, earning del Potro's loyalty, where most other top players are signed with big companies.

In 2013 he joined Andy Murray's expanding management team. He has known Murray since the Scot was a junior. His role makes him responsible for Murray's tournament-related activity.

== Challenger titles ==
=== Singles: (1) ===
No.	Year	Tournament	Surface	Opponent	Score
1.	1991	Benin City, Nigeria	Hard	(Senegal) Yahiya Doumbia	6–4, 3–6, 6–4

=== Doubles: (2) ===
No.	Year	Tournament	Surface	Partner	Opponents	Score
1.	1989	Dublin, Ireland	Carpet	(Kenya) Paul Wekesa	(United States) Ted Scherman (Republic of Ireland) Peter Wright	6–4, 6–4
2.	1991	Lagos, Nigeria	Hard	(Kenya) Paul Wekesa	(Spain) Daniel Marco (Ivory Coast) Clement N'Goran	7–5, 6–1
