= Paolo Pambianco =

Italian tennis player

- Full name: Paolo Pambianco
- Country (sports): Italy
- Born: 11 July 1967 (age 57); Forlì, Italy
- Height: 191 cm (6 ft 3 in)
- Plays: Right-handed
- Prize money: $62,279

Singles
- Career record: 7–8
- Highest ranking: No. 160 (17 June 1991)

Doubles
- Career record: 1–4
- Highest ranking: No. 451 (18 June 1990)

Paolo Pambianco (born 11 July 1967) is a former professional tennis player from Italy.

== Biography ==
Born in Forl', he is the son of Arnaldo Pambianco, a cyclist who won the 1961 Giro d'Italia.

Pambianco began competing on the professional tour in 1987. His best performance on the Grand Prix circuit came in 1989 when he made the quarter-finals of the Bologna Outdoor tournament. He reached his best ranking of 160 in the world in 1991.

He won a bronze medal for Italy in the men's singles event at the 1991 Mediterranean Games held in Athens.
