= Otis Smith (tennis) =

American professional tennis player

- Country (sports): United States
- Born: December 8, 1965 (age 59); Los Angeles, California
- Height: 5 ft 11 in (180 cm)
- Plays: Left-handed
- Prize money: $36,612

Singles
- Career record: 0–1
- Highest ranking: No. 274 (Sep 24, 1990)

Grand Slam singles results
- Wimbledon: Q1 (1991)

Doubles
- Career record: 0–2
- Highest ranking: No. 216 (Jul 29, 1991)

Grand Slam doubles results
- Wimbledon: Q1 (1991)

Otis Smith (born December 8, 1965) is an American former professional tennis player.

== Tennis career ==
A left-hander from Los Angeles, Smith competed in varsity tennis for the UCLA Bruins and recovered from a badly broken wrist in 1985 to play number one singles for the team. When he finished up at the Bruins in 1987 he joined the international tour and featured regularly on the ATP Challenger Tour. He reached a best singles world ranking of 274 and featured in the qualifying draw for the 1991 Wimbledon Championships.

== ATP Challenger finals ==
=== Doubles: 4 (0–4) ===
Result	No.	Date	Tournament	Surface	Partner	Opponents	Score
Loss	1.	Jul 1988	Salou, Spain	Clay	(United States) Scott Patridge	(Brazil) Marcelo Hennemann (France) Jean-Marc Piacentile	4–6, 1–6
Loss	2.	Sep 1988	Azores, Portugal	Hard	(United States) Charles Merzbacher	(Nigeria) Nduka Odizor (France) Éric Winogradsky	4–6, 4–6
Loss	3.	Sep 1990	Coquitlam, Canada	Hard	(The Bahamas) Roger Smith	(United States) Steve DeVries (United States) Patrick Galbraith	5–7, 5–7
Loss	4.	Jul 1991	Nyon, Switzerland	Clay	(Netherlands) Vincent Van Gelderen	(Czechoslovakia) Martin Damm (Czechoslovakia) Branislav Stankovič	1–6, 6–7
