= Ugo Pigato =

Italian tennis player and coach

- Country (sports): Italy
- Born: 14 April 1968 (age 56)
- Plays: Right-handed

Singles
- Highest ranking: No. 373 (31 July 1989)

Doubles
- Career record: 0–3
- Highest ranking: No. 164 (31 July 1989)

Ugo Pigato (born 14 April 1968) is an Italian tennis coach and former professional player.

While competing on the professional tour in the late 1980s, Pigato reached best rankings of 373 in singles and 164 in doubles. He won an ATP Challenger doubles title in Geneva in 1989.

Pigato is now the director of the Milano Tennis Academy. He coaches his daughter, Lisa Pigato, who won the girls' doubles title at the 2020 French Open and plays on the WTA Tour.

== ATP Challenger finals ==
=== Doubles: 3 (1–2) ===
Result	No.	Date	Tournament	Surface	Partner	Opponents	Score
Loss	1.	Sep 1988	Verona, Italy	Clay	(Italy) Marcello Bassanelli	(Sweden) Ronnie Båthman (Sweden) Stefan Svensson	4–6, 6–1, 4–6
Loss	2.	Jul 1989	Salerno, Italy	Clay	(Switzerland) Stefano Mezzadri	(Italy) Nicola Bruno (Italy) Federico Mordegan	6–7, 2–6
Win	1.	Aug 1989	Geneva, Switzerland	Clay	(West Germany) Peter Ballauff	(France) Arnaud Boetsch (Czechoslovakia) Slava Doseděl	6–4, 6–3
