= Frank Dennhardt =

German tennis player

- Country (sports): West Germany; Germany
- Residence: Bensheim
- Born: 6 December 1967 (age 57); Darmstadt, West Germany
- Height: 1.88 m (6 ft 2 in)
- Plays: Left-handed
- Prize money: $37,907

Singles
- Career record: 0–4
- Career titles: 0
- Highest ranking: No. 220 (14 November 1988)

Grand Slam singles results
- French Open: 1R (1989)

Doubles
- Career record: 0–1
- Career titles: 0
- Highest ranking: No. 426 (24 April 1989)

Frank Dennhardt (born 6 December 1967) is a former professional tennis player from Germany.

== Career ==
Dennhardt competed in the men's singles main draw at the 1989 French Open, as a qualifier. He lost in the opening round to Yugoslav player Goran Prpić in straight sets.

Dennhardt won the Bangalore Challenger tournament in 1991.

== Challenger titles ==
=== Singles: (1) ===
No.	Year	Tournament	Surface	Opponent	Score
1.	1991	Bangalore, India	Clay	(Georgia (country)) Vladimir Gabrichidze	3–6, 6–4, 6–4
