= Guillermo Rivas (tennis) =

Argentine tennis player

- Full name: Guillermo Rivas
- Country (sports): Argentina
- Born: 9 February 1964 (age 61); Buenos Aires, Argentina
- Plays: Right-handed
- Prize money: $93,919

Singles
- Career record: 10–27
- Career titles: 0
- Highest ranking: No. 116 (20 May 1985)

Doubles
- Career record: 5–14
- Career titles: 0
- Highest ranking: No. 289 (16 April 1990)

Guillermo Rivas (born 9 February 1964) is a former professional tennis player from Argentina.

== Biography ==
Born in the Buenos Aires neighbourhood of Béccar, Rivas learned his tennis at Club San Fernando, inspired by Guillermo Vilas's 1977 US Open triumph, when Rivas was 13. He later trained at the Buenos Aires Lawn Tennis Club and turned professional in 1982.

Rivas was a member of the Argentina Davis Cup squad for ties in Rome in 1983 and Atlanta in 1984, but didn't feature in either.

During his professional career his ranking peaked at 116 in 1985, a year in which he made the round of 16 at the WCT Tournament of Champions in Forest Hills. One of his wins in that tournament was over 10th seed Tim Wilkison, then ranked 36th in the world. In 1985 he also had a win over Thomas Muster, en route to the final of the Parioli Challenger. In the final he saved two match points to defeat Simone Colombo in a last set tiebreak. It was the first of two Challenger tournaments that he won, the other was the 1988 Crans-Montana Challenger. In 1989 he made the quarter-finals of a Grand Prix tournament, the Rio de Janeiro Open, and beat Petr Korda at a Challenger event in Clermont-Ferrand.

Between 2006 and 2009 he was vice-captain of the Canadian Davis Cup team, working with Frank Dancevic, Daniel Nestor and Frederic Niemeyer.

Now living in Florida, Rivas runs the Grita Tennis Academy in Palm Beach County. Players produced by the academy include Argentina's Facundo Mena and Bahamas player Philip Wilbert Major. He has also trained Barbados Davis Cup representative Haydn Lewis.

== Challenger titles ==
=== Singles: (2) ===
No.	Year	Tournament	Surface	Opponent	Score
1.	1985	Parioli, Italy	Clay	(Italy) Simone Colombo	7–6, 1–6, 7–6
2.	1988	Crans-Montana, Switzerland	Clay	(Sweden) Lars-Anders Wahlgren	1–6, 6–3, 6–4
