= Julian Barham =

American tennis player

- Full name: Julian Barham
- Country (sports): United States
- Born: February 23, 1965 (age 60); Riverside, California, U.S.

Singles
- Highest ranking: No. 629 (June 12, 1989)

Doubles
- Career record: 0–6
- Highest ranking: No. 149 (October 17, 1988)

Grand Slam doubles results
- Australian Open: 1R (1989)

Julian Barham (born February 23, 1965) is a former professional tennis player from the United States.

== Biography ==
Barham, who comes from Riverside, California, played collegiate tennis at UC Irvine before turning professional. He earned All-American honors in 1987, having reached the NCAA championship doubles final with Darren Yates.

From 1988 to 1989, he competed on the professional tour, mostly as a doubles player. Partnering Peter Wright, Barham featured in the main draw of the men's doubles at the 1989 Australian Open.

== Challenger titles ==
=== Doubles: (1) ===
No.	Year	Tournament	Surface	Partner	Opponents	Score
1.	1988	Waiblingen, West Germany	Clay	(Sweden) Rikard Bergh	(Italy) Ugo Colombini (Italy) Simone Colombo	6–4, 7–5
