= Conny Falk =

Swedish tennis player

- Full name: Conny Falk
- Country (sports): Sweden
- Born: 30 November 1966 (age 59) Stockholm, Sweden
- Height: 188 cm (6 ft 2 in)
- Prize money: $27,508

Singles
- Career record: 0–1
- Highest ranking: No. 155 (28 March 1988)

Doubles
- Career record: 0–2
- Highest ranking: No. 176 (4 May 1987)

Conny Falk (born 30 November 1966) is a former professional tennis player from Sweden.

== Biography ==
Born in Stockholm, Falk began competing on the professional tour in 1985. He appeared in the main draw of the Madrid Tennis Grand Prix in 1988, but competed mostly on the Challenger circuit. Ranked as high as 155 in singles, he won a Challenger tournament at Travemünde in 1988. He also won three Challenger titles in doubles.

While on a visit to the University of Miami in 1988 to see his friend Johan Donar, Falk enquired in the tennis office about the possibility of a scholarship. One was available as Francisco Montana had dropped out at the last minute and Falk joined the university, where he became a three-time All-American and NCAA semi-finalist. In 1991 he became the first University of Miami player to attain the number one ranking.

== Challenger titles ==
=== Singles: (1) ===
No.	Year	Tournament	Surface	Opponent	Score
1.	1988	Travemünde, West Germany	Clay	(Poland) Wojciech Kowalski	7–6, 6–3

=== Doubles: (3) ===
No.	Year	Tournament	Surface	Partner	Opponents	Score
1.	1987	Porto, Portugal	Clay	(Sweden) Stefan Svensson	(Sweden) Ronnie Båthman (Denmark) Michael Tauson	7–5, 5–7, 6–3
2.	1988	Marrakesh, Morocco	Clay	(Sweden) Christer Allgårdh	(United States) Lawson Duncan (West Germany) Hans Schwaier	6–3, 6–2
3.	1989	Salou, Spain	Clay	(United States) Robbie Weiss	(Sweden) Per Henricsson (Sweden) Nicklas Utgren	5–7, 7–6, 6–4
