= Massimo Cierro =

Italian tennis player (born 1964)

- Country (sports): Italy
- Born: 7 May 1964 (age 62) Naples, Italy
- Height: 1.73 m (5 ft 8 in)
- Turned pro: 1984
- Plays: Right-handed
- Prize money: $313,726

Singles
- Career record: 18–46
- Career titles: 0
- Highest ranking: No. 113 (19 Aug 1985)

Grand Slam singles results
- Australian Open: 1R (1992)
- French Open: 1R (1992)
- US Open: 1R (1985)

Doubles
- Career record: 22–41
- Career titles: 0
- Highest ranking: No. 122 (23 May 1988)

Grand Slam doubles results
- French Open: 1R (1988)

Massimo Cierro (born 7 May 1964) is a former professional tennis player from Italy.

== Career ==
Cierro never won a Grand Slam match. He lost to 15th seed Scott Davis at 1985 US Open, Patrick McEnroe in the 1992 Australian Open and Henri Leconte at the 1992 French Open, all in straight sets.

The biggest win of his career was at the Championship Series event, the Italian Open, in 1991, when he defeated world number 13 Karel Nováček.

Cierro was a quarter-finalist at Bordeaux in 1989, San Marino in 1989 and Palermo in 1991.

Partnering Alessandro de Minicis he made two ATP doubles finals, in Saint-Vincent, losing both.

== Grand Prix career finals ==
=== Doubles: 2 (0–2) ===
Result	W/L	Date	Tournament	Surface	Partner	Opponents	Score
Loss	0–1	Aug 1987	Saint-Vincent, Italy	Clay	(Italy) Alessandro de Minicis	(United States) Bud Cox (Australia) Michael Fancutt	3–6, 4–6
Loss	0–2	Aug 1989	Saint-Vincent, Italy	Clay	(Italy) Alessandro de Minicis	(Czechoslovakia) Josef Čihák (Czechoslovakia) Cyril Suk	4–6, 2–6

== Challenger titles ==
=== Singles: (3) ===
No.	Year	Tournament	Surface	Opponent	Score
1.	1988	Parioli, Italy	Clay	(Sweden) Thomas Haldin	6–1, 6–1
2.	1988	Verona, Italy	Clay	(Spain) Carlos Costa	5–7, 6–2, 7–5
3.	1989	Pescara, Italy	Clay	(Sweden) Magnus Larsson	6–3, 6–3

=== Doubles: (5) ===
No.	Year	Tournament	Surface	Partner	Opponents	Score
1.	1985	Belo Horizonte, Brazil	Clay	(Brazil) Júlio Góes	(Brazil) Givaldo Barbosa (Brazil) Ivan Kley	6–3, 6–4
2.	1989	Parioli, Italy	Clay	(Italy) Alessandro de Minicis	(Italy) Enrico Cocchi (Italy) Francesco Pisilli	6–4, 6–1
3.	1990	Neu-Ulm, West Germany	Clay	(Italy) Simone Colombo	(Romania) George Cosac (Czechoslovakia) Vojtěch Flégl	0–6, 6–2, 6–1
4.	1991	Zaragoza, Spain	Clay	(Italy) Stefano Pescosolido	(Spain) Juan Carlos Báguena (Spain) David de Miguel	6–2, 6–4
5.	1992	Pescara, Italy	Clay	(Sweden) Nicklas Utgren	(The Bahamas) Mark Knowles (The Bahamas) Roger Smith	6–4, 6–4
