= Gerardo Vacarezza =

Chilean tennis player

- Country (sports): Chile
- Born: 16 August 1965 (age 60) Santiago, Chile
- Plays: Right-handed
- Prize money: $31,361

Singles
- Career record: 1–1 (ATP Tour)
- Highest ranking: No. 165 (29 August 1988)

Doubles
- Career record: 1–1 (ATP Tour)
- Highest ranking: No. 282 (17 November 1986)

Team competitions
- Davis Cup: 3–3

Gerardo Vacarezza (born 16 August 1965) is a Chilean former professional tennis player.

Vacarezza, who was born in Santiago, reached a best singles ranking on the professional tour of 165 in the world. He won two titles on the Challenger Tour and made his only Grand Prix (ATP Tour) main draw appearance at Buenos Aires in 1986, where he made the second round.

A right-handed player, Vacarezza featured in five Davis Cup ties for Chile from 1986 to 1991. Vacarezza won one of his three singles rubbers, which came against Brazil's Nelson Aerts. He also had a doubles win over future world number one Mark Knowles of the Bahamas.

== Challenger titles ==
=== Singles: (2) ===
No.	Year	Tournament	Surface	Opponent	Score
1.	1986	Knokke, Belgium	Clay	(Sweden) Christer Allgårdh	6–3, 6–3
2.	1988	Ostend, Belgium	Clay	(India) Srinivasan Vasudevan	6–1, 6–1

== See also ==
- List of Chile Davis Cup team representatives
