= Jean-Marc Piacentile =

French tennis player

- Country (sports): France
- Born: 18 April 1963 (age 61)
- Height: 5 ft 10 in (178 cm)
- Plays: Right-handed
- Prize money: $19,478

Singles
- Career record: 1–4
- Highest ranking: No. 195 (26 October 1987)

Doubles
- Career record: 6–11
- Highest ranking: No. 147 (13 July 1987)

Grand Slam doubles results
- French Open: 2R (1983)

Jean-Marc Piacentile (born 18 April 1963) is a French former professional tennis player.

Piacentile, a right-handed player, competed on the professional tour in the 1980s, reaching a best singles ranking of 195 in the world. His best performance on the Grand Prix circuit was a second round appearance at the 1982 Ancona Open.

As a doubles player he made three appearances in the main draw of the French Open and won a Challenger title in Salou in 1988.

Following his tennis career he worked as the leader of a players' union.

== Challenger titles ==
=== Doubles: (1) ===
No.	Year	Tournament	Surface	Partner	Opponents	Score
1.	1988	Salou, Spain	Clay	(Brazil) Marcelo Hennemann	(United States) Scott Patridge (United States) Otis Smith	6–4, 6–1
