= Stefan Lochbihler =

Austrian tennis player

- Full name: Stefan Lochbihler
- Country (sports): Austria
- Born: 1 October 1965 (age 59); Innsbruck, Austria
- Height: 5 ft 11 in (180 cm)
- Plays: Right-handed
- Prize money: $31,299

Singles
- Career record: 3–7
- Highest ranking: No. 141 (24 July 1989)

Stefan Lochbihler (born 1 October 1965) is a former professional tennis player from Austria.

== Biography ==
A right-handed player from Tyrol, Lochbihler reached a career best ranking of 141 in the world. He had his best year on tour in 1989 when he won a São Paulo Challenger event and featured in the main draw of seven Grand Prix tournaments. At the Campionati Internazionali di Sicilia that year he won a match against former world number 21 Francesco Cancellotti.

Lochbihler has been the personal coach of Stephanie Vogt and in 2012 was appointed as the national coach of Liechtenstein.

== Challenger titles ==
=== Singles: (1) ===
No.	Year	Tournament	Surface	Opponent	Score
1.	1989	São Paulo, Brazil	Clay	(Canada) Martin Wostenholme	6–3, 7–5
