= Stefan Svensson =

Swedish tennis player

- Full name: Stefan Svensson
- Country (sports): Sweden
- Born: 17 February 1962 (age 64) Gothenburg, Sweden
- Plays: Right-handed

Singles
- Career record: 3–11
- Career titles: 0
- Highest ranking: No. 245 (22 December 1980)

Grand Slam singles results
- Wimbledon: Q1 (1980, 1986)

Doubles
- Career record: 27–50
- Career titles: 0
- Highest ranking: No. 123 (28 April 1986)

Grand Slam doubles results
- Australian Open: 1R (1988)
- French Open: 2R (1983)
- Wimbledon: 2R (1980)

Mixed doubles
- Career titles: 0

Grand Slam mixed doubles results
- Wimbledon: 2R (1987)

Stefan Svensson (born 17 February 1962) is a former professional tennis player from Sweden.

== Biography ==
Svensson was born in Gothenburg but based in Kungälv.

A leading junior in Sweden, he won both European and national championships at various age levels. In 1979 he was a member of the Swedish team that finished runners-up to the United States in the Sunshine Cup. He also made the semi-finals of the boys' singles that year at the Orange Bowl and 1979 Wimbledon Championships.

Specialising in doubles, Svensson played professionally in the 1980s and won a total of five Challenger titles. During his career he featured in the men's doubles events at the Australian Open, French Open and Wimbledon Championships. He made Grand Prix doubles semi-finals in Linz in 1979, Båstad in 1980, Sofia in 1980, Nice in 1981 and Tel Aviv in 1986. In singles, he had a win over West German Davis Cup player Damir Keretić in the first round of a Grand Prix tournament in Barcelona.

He has worked for many years as a coach with the Swedish Tennis Association.

== Challenger titles ==
=== Doubles: (5) ===
Year	Tournament	Surface	Partner	Opponents	Score
1981	Essen, West Germany	Clay	(Sweden) Jan Gunnarsson	(Australia) Ernie Ewert (West Germany) Damir Keretić	7–6, 7–6
1983	Ashkelon, Israel	Hard	(Netherlands) Huub Van Boeckel	(United States) Rodney Crowley (United States) Rand Evett	6–4, 4–6, 6–3
1986	Brasília, Brazil	Clay	(Sweden) Ronnie Båthman	(Argentina) Gustavo Luza (Argentina) Gustavo Tiberti	6–4, 6–1
1987	Porto, Portugal	Clay	(Sweden) Conny Falk	(Sweden) Ronnie Båthman (Denmark) Michael Tauson	7–5, 5–7, 6–3
1988	Verona, Italy	Clay	(Sweden) Ronnie Båthman	(Italy) Marcello Bassanelli (Italy) Ugo Pigato	6–4, 1–6, 6–4
