= Peter Wright (tennis) =

Irish American tennis player

- Country (sports): United States (Republic of Ireland) Ireland
- Residence: Berkeley, California, U.S.
- Born: December 8, 1963 (age 61) Berkeley, California, U.S.
- Height: 6 ft 1 in (1.85 m)
- Turned pro: 1986
- Plays: Right-handed

Singles
- Career record: 0–4
- Career titles: 0
- Highest ranking: No. 300 (July 2, 1977)

Doubles
- Career record: 1–8
- Career titles: 0
- Highest ranking: No. 190 (August 21, 1989)

Grand Slam doubles results
- Australian Open: 1R (1989)

Mixed doubles
- Career titles: 0

Grand Slam mixed doubles results
- Wimbledon: 1R (1989)

Peter Wright (born December 8, 1963) is a former Irish American professional tennis player who played for Ireland in the Davis Cup. He was formerly the head tennis coach at the University of California, Berkeley.

== Playing career ==
Wright, who was born and raised in Berkeley, qualified to represent Ireland in international tennis as it was the country of his parents. He appeared in 13 Davis Cup ties from 1988 to 1994 and won 16 of his 27 rubbers, 8 in singles and 8 in doubles.

Although he was seen mostly on the Challenger circuit, Wright took part in the 1987 Seoul Open, a Grand Prix tournament. He was beaten in the opening round by Dutch player Michiel Schapers.

In 1989 he played in the men's doubles event at the Australian Open, partnering fellow Californian Julian Barham. The pairing of Tim Pawsat and Tobias Svantesson defeated them in the first round. He also appeared in the 1989 Wimbledon Championships, as a mixed doubles player, with Lea Antonoplis as his partner. They weren't able to make the second round.

== Coaching ==
Wright was head coach of the California Golden Bears (UC Berkeley) tennis team from 1993 to 2021. In that time they have only once failed to make the NCAA postseason. He was the Pac-10 Coach of the Year in 1997 and again in 2001.

From 1995 to 2003, Wright was captain of the Ireland Davis Cup team.

He also served as Ireland's head tennis coach at the 1996 Summer Olympics.

== Challenger titles ==
=== Doubles: (2) ===
| No. | Year | Tournament | Surface | Partner | Opponents | Score |
|---|---|---|---|---|---|---|
| 1. | 1986 | Berkeley, United States | Hard | (United States) Randy Nixon | (United States) Mike Bauer (United States) Charles Strode | 6–4, 6–3 |
| 2. | 1988 | Brisbane, Australia | Hard | (Australia) Paul Kronk | (Australia) Steve Furlong (Australia) John Gibson | 6–7, 6–4, 6–4 |
