= Alessandro de Minicis =

Italian tennis player

- Country (sports): Italy
- Born: 4 August 1963 (age 62) Cagliari, Italy
- Height: 1.75 m (5 ft 9 in)
- Plays: Right-handed
- Prize money: $120,206

Singles
- Career record: 9-17
- Career titles: 0
- Highest ranking: No. 135 (9 Sep 1985)

Doubles
- Career record: 17-30
- Career titles: 0
- Highest ranking: No. 108 (17 Aug 1987)

Alessandro de Minicis (born 4 August 1963) is a former professional tennis player from Italy.

== Career ==
De Minicis was a quarter-finalist at Båstad in 1985 and finished runner-up at the Florence Open in 1987.

As a doubles player he reached two finals, both in Saint-Vincent, but was beaten on each occasion.

The Italian never competed in the main draw of a Grand Slam tournament.

== Grand Prix career finals ==
=== Singles: 1 (0–1) ===
Result	W–L	Date	Tournament	Surface	Opponent	Score
Loss	0–1	May 1987	Florence, Italy	Clay	(Soviet Union) Andrei Chesnokov	1–6, 3–6

=== Doubles: 2 (0–2) ===
Result	W–L	Date	Tournament	Surface	Partner	Opponents	Score
Loss	0–1	Aug 1987	Saint-Vincent, Italy	Clay	(Italy) Massimo Cierro	(United States) Bud Cox (Australia) Michael Fancutt	3–6, 4–6
Loss	0–2	Aug 1989	Saint-Vincent, Italy	Clay	(Italy) Massimo Cierro	(Czechoslovakia) Josef Čihák (Czechoslovakia) Cyril Suk	4–6, 2–6

== Challenger titles ==
=== Doubles: (3) ===
No.	Year	Tournament	Surface	Partner	Opponents	Score
1.	1985	Tampere, Finland	Clay	(Brazil) Dacio Campos	(Brazil) Carlos Kirmayr (Brazil) Luiz Mattar	6–4, 1–6, 6–3
2.	1988	Pescara, Italy	Clay	(Sweden) Ronnie Båthman	(Czechoslovakia) Josef Čihák (Czechoslovakia) Richard Vogel	4–6, 6–3, 6–3
3.	1989	Parioli, Italy	Clay	(Italy) Massimo Cierro	(Italy) Enrico Cocchi (Italy) Francesco Pisilli	6–4, 6–1
