= Nicklas Utgren =

Swedish tennis player (born 1969)

- Country (sports): Sweden
- Residence: Vänersborg, Sweden
- Born: 12 January 1969 (age 56); Vänersborg, Sweden
- Height: 1.88 m (6 ft 2 in)
- Turned pro: 1989
- Plays: Right-handed
- Prize money: $249,960

Singles
- Career record: 7–13
- Career titles: 0
- Highest ranking: No. 138 (20 Nov 1989)

Grand Slam singles results
- Australian Open: Q3 (1990)
- French Open: Q3 (1996)
- Wimbledon: Q2 (1996)

Doubles
- Career record: 25–33
- Career titles: 1
- Highest ranking: No. 55 (23 Jul 1990)

Grand Slam doubles results
- Australian Open: 3R (1990)
- French Open: 1R (1990, 1991, 1994)
- Wimbledon: Q2 (1994)

Nicklas Utgren (born 12 January 1969), is a former professional tennis player from Sweden. He enjoyed most of his tennis success while playing doubles. During his career he won 1 doubles title. He achieved a career-high doubles ranking of world No. 55 in 1990. He ended his career when he was 27 years old.

== Career finals ==
=== Doubles (1 win, 2 losses) ===
Result	W/L	Date	Tournament	Surface	Partner	Opponents	Score
Win	1–0	Aug 1989	Båstad, Sweden	Clay	(Sweden) Per Henricsson	(Czech Republic) Josef Čihák (Czech Republic) Karel Nováček	7–5, 6–2
Loss	1–1	Jul 1990	Stuttgart Outdoor, Germany	Clay	(Sweden) Per Henricsson	(South Africa) Pieter Aldrich (South Africa) Danie Visser	3–6, 4–6
Loss	1–2	Apr 1991	Nice, France	Clay	(Czech Republic) Vojtěch Flégl	(Sweden) Rikard Bergh (Sweden) Jan Gunnarsson	4–6, 6–4, 3–6
