= 1989 ATP Challenger Series =

Details
- Duration: 9 January 1989 – 10 December 1989
- Edition: 12th
- Tournaments: 95

Achievements (singles)

The ATP Challenger Series is the second-tier tour for men's professional tennis organised by the Association of Tennis Professionals (ATP), below the 1989 Grand Prix. The 1989 ATP Challenger Series calendar comprises 94 tournaments, with prize money ranging from $25,000 up to $75,000.

== Schedule ==
=== January ===
Week	Tournament	Champions	Runners-up	Semifinalists	Quarterfinalists
9 Jan	Viña del Mar Challenger; Viña del Mar, Chile $25,000 – clay – 32S/16D; Singles draw – Doubles draw	(Peru) Carlos di Laura; 6–4, 6–4	(Chile) Pedro Rebolledo	(Argentina) Roberto Azar (Chile) Felipe Rivera	(Chile) Robinson Ureta (Argentina) Guillermo Rivas (Chile) Sergio Cortés (Ecuador) Raúl Viver
9 Jan	Viña del Mar Challenger; Viña del Mar, Chile $25,000 – clay – 32S/16D; Singles draw – Doubles draw	(Argentina) José Luis Clerc (Chile) Hans Gildemeister; 7–5, 6–2	(United States) Richard Ashby (United States) Laneal Vaughn	(Argentina) Roberto Azar (Chile) Felipe Rivera	(Chile) Robinson Ureta (Argentina) Guillermo Rivas (Chile) Sergio Cortés (Ecuador) Raúl Viver

=== February ===
Week	Tournament	Champions	Runners-up	Semifinalists	Quarterfinalists
6 Feb	Telford Challenger; Telford, Great Britain $25,000 – carpet (I) – 32S/16D; Singles draw – Doubles draw	(Denmark) Michael Tauson; 6–4, 6–3	(Sweden) Peter Nyborg	(United States) Kent Kinnear (Italy) Simone Colombo	(United Kingdom) Mark Petchey (South Africa) Byron Talbot (United States) Brad Pearce (United States) Peter Palandjian
6 Feb	Telford Challenger; Telford, Great Britain $25,000 – carpet (I) – 32S/16D; Singles draw – Doubles draw	(United Kingdom) Jeremy Bates (United Kingdom) Nick Brown; 6–4, 7–6	(Sweden) Ronnie Båthman (Sweden) Rikard Bergh	(United States) Kent Kinnear (Italy) Simone Colombo	(United Kingdom) Mark Petchey (South Africa) Byron Talbot (United States) Brad Pearce (United States) Peter Palandjian
13 Feb	Croydon Challenger; Croydon, Great Britain $25,000 – carpet (I) – 32S/16D; Singles draw – Doubles draw	(Denmark) Michael Tauson; 6–4, 7–6	(United Kingdom) Chris Bailey	(United Kingdom) Danny Sapsford (South Africa) Denys Maasdorp	(South Africa) Byron Talbot (United States) Scott Warner (Sweden) Peter Svensson (South Africa) Tertius Reynders
13 Feb	Croydon Challenger; Croydon, Great Britain $25,000 – carpet (I) – 32S/16D; Singles draw – Doubles draw	(Australia) Russell Barlow (Sweden) Ville Jansson; 2–6, 6–3, 7–5	(United States) Mike De Palmer (South Africa) Byron Talbot	(United Kingdom) Danny Sapsford (South Africa) Denys Maasdorp	(South Africa) Byron Talbot (United States) Scott Warner (Sweden) Peter Svensson (South Africa) Tertius Reynders
13 Feb	Lagos Open; Lagos, Nigeria $75,000 – hard – 32S/16D; Singles draw – Doubles draw	(Netherlands) Paul Haarhuis; 4–6, 7–6, 6–4	(Czechoslovakia) Karel Nováček	(Nigeria) Nduka Odizor (United States) Ned Caswell	(Austria) Oliver Fuchs (Netherlands) Jacco Eltingh (Soviet Union) Andres Võsand (India) Zeeshan Ali
13 Feb	Lagos Open; Lagos, Nigeria $75,000 – hard – 32S/16D; Singles draw – Doubles draw	(Venezuela) Alfonso Mora (United States) James Schor; 4–6, 7–6, 6–2	(Netherlands) Jacco Eltingh (Netherlands) Paul Haarhuis	(Nigeria) Nduka Odizor (United States) Ned Caswell	(Austria) Oliver Fuchs (Netherlands) Jacco Eltingh (Soviet Union) Andres Võsand (India) Zeeshan Ali
13 Feb	São Paulo-1 Challenger; São Paulo, Brazil $25,000 – clay – 32S/16D; Singles draw – Doubles draw	(Austria) Stefan Lochbihler; 6–3, 7–5	(Canada) Martin Wostenholme	(Brazil) Alexandre Hocevar (United States) Jimmy Brown	(United States) Mark Buckley (Peru) Alejandro Aramburú (Ecuador) Raúl Viver (Argentina) Pablo Albano
13 Feb	São Paulo-1 Challenger; São Paulo, Brazil $25,000 – clay – 32S/16D; Singles draw – Doubles draw	(Brazil) Marcelo Hennemann (Brazil) Edvaldo Oliveira; 6–3, 6–3	(Brazil) Nelson Aerts (Brazil) Alexandre Hocevar	(Brazil) Alexandre Hocevar (United States) Jimmy Brown	(United States) Mark Buckley (Peru) Alejandro Aramburú (Ecuador) Raúl Viver (Argentina) Pablo Albano
20 Feb	Nairobi Challenger; Nairobi, Kenya $25,000 – clay – 32S/16D; Singles draw – Doubles draw	(Czechoslovakia) Karel Nováček; 6–3, 6–3	(West Germany) Sascha Nensel	(The Bahamas) Mark Knowles (Italy) Fabio Di Mauro	(United States) Ned Caswell (Netherlands) Paul Dogger (Italy) Paolo Pambianco (Canada) Andrew Sznajder
20 Feb	Nairobi Challenger; Nairobi, Kenya $25,000 – clay – 32S/16D; Singles draw – Doubles draw	(United States) Ned Caswell (United States) Chris Garner; 6–3, 7–6	(Italy) Fabio Di Mauro (Italy) Mario Visconti	(The Bahamas) Mark Knowles (Italy) Fabio Di Mauro	(United States) Ned Caswell (Netherlands) Paul Dogger (Italy) Paolo Pambianco (Canada) Andrew Sznajder
20 Feb	Vienna Challenger; Vienna, Austria $25,000 – carpet (I) – 32S/16D; Singles draw – Doubles draw	(Italy) Omar Camporese; 6–4, 3–6, 6–3	(Sweden) Nicklas Utgren	(Czechoslovakia) Libor Němeček (Socialist Federal Republic of Yugoslavia) Goran Prpić	(United States) Charles Merzbacher (United States) Brett Dickinson (Czechoslovakia) Branislav Stankovič (Austria) Hans Priller
20 Feb	Vienna Challenger; Vienna, Austria $25,000 – carpet (I) – 32S/16D; Singles draw – Doubles draw	(Sweden) Peter Nyborg (Sweden) Nicklas Utgren; 6–4, 6–4	(Soviet Union) Ģirts Dzelde (Socialist Federal Republic of Yugoslavia) Goran Prpić	(Czechoslovakia) Libor Němeček (Socialist Federal Republic of Yugoslavia) Goran Prpić	(United States) Charles Merzbacher (United States) Brett Dickinson (Czechoslovakia) Branislav Stankovič (Austria) Hans Priller
27 Feb	Palm Hills International Tennis Challenger; Cairo, Egypt $75,000 – clay – 32S/16D; Singles draw – Doubles draw	(Spain) Sergi Bruguera; 6–7, 6–4, 6–4	(Spain) Jordi Arrese	(Spain) Tomás Carbonell (Argentina) Gustavo Giussani	(Czechoslovakia) Cyril Suk (Peru) Pablo Arraya (Argentina) Christian Miniussi (United States) Michael Kures
27 Feb	Palm Hills International Tennis Challenger; Cairo, Egypt $75,000 – clay – 32S/16D; Singles draw – Doubles draw	(Spain) Jordi Arrese (Spain) Tomás Carbonell; 7–6, 6–3	(Spain) Carlos Costa (Spain) Francisco Roig	(Spain) Tomás Carbonell (Argentina) Gustavo Giussani	(Czechoslovakia) Cyril Suk (Peru) Pablo Arraya (Argentina) Christian Miniussi (United States) Michael Kures

=== March ===
Week	Tournament	Champions	Runners-up	Semifinalists	Quarterfinalists
6 Mar	Casablanca Challenger; Casablanca, Morocco $75,000 – clay – 32S/16D; Singles draw – Doubles draw	(Soviet Union) Andres Võsand; 3–6, 7–6, 6–0	(Netherlands) Mark Koevermans	(Spain) Sergi Bruguera (Spain) Fernando Luna	(Spain) Jordi Arrese (Argentina) Roberto Azar (Italy) Claudio Pistolesi (Czechoslovakia) Martin Střelba
6 Mar	Casablanca Challenger; Casablanca, Morocco $75,000 – clay – 32S/16D; Singles draw – Doubles draw	(Czechoslovakia) Josef Čihák (Netherlands) Mark Koevermans; 6–4, 6–4	(Argentina) Marcelo Ingaramo (Argentina) Christian Miniussi	(Spain) Sergi Bruguera (Spain) Fernando Luna	(Spain) Jordi Arrese (Argentina) Roberto Azar (Italy) Claudio Pistolesi (Czechoslovakia) Martin Střelba
6 Mar	Intersport Heilbronn Open; Heilbronn, West Germany $25,000 – carpet (I) – 32S/16D; Singles draw – Doubles draw	(West Germany) Michael Stich; 6–3, 6–2	(Denmark) Michael Tauson	(West Germany) Udo Riglewski (West Germany) Karsten Braasch	(West Germany) Dirk Leppen (Netherlands) Jan-Willem Lodder (West Germany) Gerald Marzenell (United States) Bruce Steel
6 Mar	Intersport Heilbronn Open; Heilbronn, West Germany $25,000 – carpet (I) – 32S/16D; Singles draw – Doubles draw	(West Germany) Michael Stich (West Germany) Martin Sinner; 4–6, 6–4, 7–6	(Romania) George Cosac (Romania) Adrian Marcu	(West Germany) Udo Riglewski (West Germany) Karsten Braasch	(West Germany) Dirk Leppen (Netherlands) Jan-Willem Lodder (West Germany) Gerald Marzenell (United States) Bruce Steel
13 Mar	Agadir Challenger; Agadir, Morocco $75,000 – clay – 32S/16D; Singles draw – Doubles draw	(Socialist Federal Republic of Yugoslavia) Goran Prpić; 6–3, 6–3	(Netherlands) Mark Koevermans	(Spain) Jordi Arrese (Sweden) Thomas Haldin	(Spain) Sergi Bruguera (Czechoslovakia) Martin Střelba (Argentina) Roberto Azar (Spain) Fernando Luna
13 Mar	Agadir Challenger; Agadir, Morocco $75,000 – clay – 32S/16D; Singles draw – Doubles draw	(Czechoslovakia) Josef Čihák (Czechoslovakia) Cyril Suk; 6–3, 6–3	(United States) Brett Dickinson (Sweden) Jörgen Windahl	(Spain) Jordi Arrese (Sweden) Thomas Haldin	(Spain) Sergi Bruguera (Czechoslovakia) Martin Střelba (Argentina) Roberto Azar (Spain) Fernando Luna
13 Mar	Madeira Challenger; Madeira, Portugal $25,000 – hard – 32S/16D; Singles draw – Doubles draw	(Portugal) Nuno Marques; 6–3, 6–3	(United Kingdom) Jeremy Bates	(Sweden) Niclas Kroon (Sweden) Johan Carlsson	(United Kingdom) Chris Bailey (Sweden) Tomas Nydahl (United States) Bret Garnett (Sweden) Lars-Anders Wahlgren
13 Mar	Madeira Challenger; Madeira, Portugal $25,000 – hard – 32S/16D; Singles draw – Doubles draw	(United Kingdom) Nick Brown (United Kingdom) Andrew Castle; 6–3, 6–2	(South Africa) Warren Green (United Kingdom) Steve Shaw	(Sweden) Niclas Kroon (Sweden) Johan Carlsson	(United Kingdom) Chris Bailey (Sweden) Tomas Nydahl (United States) Bret Garnett (Sweden) Lars-Anders Wahlgren
20 Mar	San Luis Potosí Challenger; San Luis Potosí, Mexico $25,000 – clay – 32S/16D; Singles draw – Doubles draw	(Mexico) Jorge Lozano; 6–4, 6–4	(Australia) Peter Doohan	(United States) Bruce Man-Son-Hing (Mexico) Stefan Dallwitz	(United States) Julian Barham (Mexico) Agustín Moreno (Mexico) Roberto López (United States) Laneal Vaughn
20 Mar	San Luis Potosí Challenger; San Luis Potosí, Mexico $25,000 – clay – 32S/16D; Singles draw – Doubles draw	(Mexico) Luis Herrera (Mexico) Javier Ordaz; 6–4, 6–7, 6–3	(The Bahamas) Mark Knowles (United States) Brian Page	(United States) Bruce Man-Son-Hing (Mexico) Stefan Dallwitz	(United States) Julian Barham (Mexico) Agustín Moreno (Mexico) Roberto López (United States) Laneal Vaughn
20 Mar	Vilamoura Challenger; Vilamoura, Portugal $50,000 – hard – 32S/16D; Singles draw – Doubles draw	(Portugal) Nuno Marques; 6–1, 4–6, 6–3	(Austria) Alex Antonitsch	(Czechoslovakia) Petr Korda (Sweden) Niclas Kroon	(Sweden) Lars-Anders Wahlgren (United Kingdom) Andrew Castle (Czechoslovakia) Jaroslav Bulant (Sweden) Johan Carlsson
20 Mar	Vilamoura Challenger; Vilamoura, Portugal $50,000 – hard – 32S/16D; Singles draw – Doubles draw	(Spain) Marcos Górriz (Spain) Borja Uribe; 6–1, 3–6, 7–6	(Italy) Simone Colombo (United Kingdom) David Felgate	(Czechoslovakia) Petr Korda (Sweden) Niclas Kroon	(Sweden) Lars-Anders Wahlgren (United Kingdom) Andrew Castle (Czechoslovakia) Jaroslav Bulant (Sweden) Johan Carlsson
27 Mar	Guadeloupe Challenger; Guadeloupe, French West Indies $50,000 – hard – 32S/16D; Singles draw – Doubles draw	(France) Guillaume Raoux; 7–6, 4–6, 7–6	(Senegal) Yahiya Doumbia	(United States) Bret Garnett (Australia) Richard Fromberg	(Netherlands) Johan Vekemans (France) Arnaud Boetsch (United States) David Wheaton (United States) Brad Pearce
27 Mar	Guadeloupe Challenger; Guadeloupe, French West Indies $50,000 – hard – 32S/16D; Singles draw – Doubles draw	(Israel) Gilad Bloom (United States) Brad Pearce; 6–4, 6–2	(West Germany) Patrick Baur (West Germany) Christian Saceanu	(United States) Bret Garnett (Australia) Richard Fromberg	(Netherlands) Johan Vekemans (France) Arnaud Boetsch (United States) David Wheaton (United States) Brad Pearce

=== April ===
Week	Tournament	Champions	Runners-up	Semifinalists	Quarterfinalists
3 Apr	Martinique Challenger; Martinique, French West Indies $50,000 – hard – 32S/16D; Singles draw – Doubles draw	(West Germany) Alexander Mronz; 6–3, 7–6	(United States) Dan Cassidy	(France) Guillaume Raoux (United States) David Wheaton	(United States) Derrick Rostagno (France) Arnaud Boetsch (West Germany) Patrick Baur (Finland) Veli Paloheimo
3 Apr	Martinique Challenger; Martinique, French West Indies $50,000 – hard – 32S/16D; Singles draw – Doubles draw	Doubles final not played.		(France) Guillaume Raoux (United States) David Wheaton	(United States) Derrick Rostagno (France) Arnaud Boetsch (West Germany) Patrick Baur (Finland) Veli Paloheimo
3 Apr	Tróia Setúbal Challenger; Tróia Setúbal, Portugal $75,000 – hard – 32S/16D; Singles draw – Doubles draw	(Canada) Chris Pridham; 6–4, 6–1	(Sweden) Rikard Bergh	(West Germany) Karsten Braasch (Portugal) Nuno Marques	(United States) Richard Matuszewski (West Germany) Torben Theine (Spain) Borja Uribe (Netherlands) Hendrik Jan Davids
3 Apr	Tróia Setúbal Challenger; Tróia Setúbal, Portugal $75,000 – hard – 32S/16D; Singles draw – Doubles draw	(United States) Steve DeVries (United States) Richard Matuszewski; 6–3, 6–1	(United Kingdom) David Felgate (United Kingdom) Steve Shaw	(West Germany) Karsten Braasch (Portugal) Nuno Marques	(United States) Richard Matuszewski (West Germany) Torben Theine (Spain) Borja Uribe (Netherlands) Hendrik Jan Davids
10 Apr	S Tennis Masters Challenger; Graz, Austria $75,000 – carpet (I) – 32S/16D; Singles draw – Doubles draw	(West Germany) Eric Jelen; 4–6, 6–0, 6–4	(Socialist Federal Republic of Yugoslavia) Goran Prpić	(Netherlands) Ralph Kok (Sweden) Henrik Holm	(Sweden) Peter Nyborg (Sweden) Ronnie Båthman (Czechoslovakia) Petr Korda (Czechoslovakia) Jaroslav Navrátil
10 Apr	S Tennis Masters Challenger; Graz, Austria $75,000 – carpet (I) – 32S/16D; Singles draw – Doubles draw	(Czechoslovakia) Petr Korda (Czechoslovakia) Jaroslav Navrátil; 6–3, 6–7, 7–5	(Czechoslovakia) Stanislav Birner (Czechoslovakia) Richard Vogel	(Netherlands) Ralph Kok (Sweden) Henrik Holm	(Sweden) Peter Nyborg (Sweden) Ronnie Båthman (Czechoslovakia) Petr Korda (Czechoslovakia) Jaroslav Navrátil
10 Apr	Jerusalem Challenger; Jerusalem, Israel $25,000 – hard – 32S/16D; Singles draw – Doubles draw	(Israel) Gilad Bloom; 7–6, 6–2	(Israel) Shahar Perkiss	(Sweden) David Engel (United Kingdom) Nick Brown	(South Africa) Lan Bale (West Germany) Torben Theine (Belgium) Denis Langaskens (United Kingdom) James Turner
10 Apr	Jerusalem Challenger; Jerusalem, Israel $25,000 – hard – 32S/16D; Singles draw – Doubles draw	(Venezuela) Alfonso Mora (United States) Mark Ozer; 6–3, 6–4	(United Kingdom) Nick Brown (United Kingdom) Nick Fulwood	(Sweden) David Engel (United Kingdom) Nick Brown	(South Africa) Lan Bale (West Germany) Torben Theine (Belgium) Denis Langaskens (United Kingdom) James Turner
17 Apr	Brasília-1 Challenger; Brasília, Brazil $75,000 – hard – 32S/16D; Singles draw – Doubles draw	(United States) David Wheaton; 6–1, 6–2	(United States) Dan Cassidy	(Brazil) Luiz Mattar (Brazil) Danilo Marcelino	(West Germany) Patrick Baur (Chile) Ricardo Acuña (Brazil) Ivan Kley (Brazil) Alexandre Hocevar
17 Apr	Brasília-1 Challenger; Brasília, Brazil $75,000 – hard – 32S/16D; Singles draw – Doubles draw	(Brazil) Ricardo Acioly (Brazil) Dácio Campos; 7–6, 6–3	(Brazil) Marcelo Hennemann (Brazil) Edvaldo Oliveira	(Brazil) Luiz Mattar (Brazil) Danilo Marcelino	(West Germany) Patrick Baur (Chile) Ricardo Acuña (Brazil) Ivan Kley (Brazil) Alexandre Hocevar
17 Apr	Porto Challenger; Porto, Portugal $75,000 – clay – 32S/16D; Singles draw – Doubles draw	(Soviet Union) Andrei Cherkasov; 7–6, 7–5	(Spain) Javier Sánchez	(Spain) Sergi Bruguera (Czechoslovakia) Marián Vajda	(Argentina) Gabriel Markus (Netherlands) Michiel Schapers (Netherlands) Paul Dogger (West Germany) Hans Schwaier
17 Apr	Porto Challenger; Porto, Portugal $75,000 – clay – 32S/16D; Singles draw – Doubles draw	(Spain) Carlos Costa (Spain) Tomás Carbonell; 6–4, 6–3	(Netherlands) Paul Haarhuis (Belgium) Denis Langaskens	(Spain) Sergi Bruguera (Czechoslovakia) Marián Vajda	(Argentina) Gabriel Markus (Netherlands) Michiel Schapers (Netherlands) Paul Dogger (West Germany) Hans Schwaier
24 Apr	Cape Town-1 Challenger; Cape Town, South Africa $75,000 – hard – 32S/16D; Singles draw – Doubles draw	(South Africa) Christo van Rensburg; 6–3, 6–1	(South Africa) Pieter Aldrich	(United Kingdom) Neil Broad (United States) Johan Kriek	(Australia) Mark Kratzmann (Australia) Brad Drewett (United States) Paul Annacone (United States) Martin Davis
24 Apr	Cape Town-1 Challenger; Cape Town, South Africa $75,000 – hard – 32S/16D; Singles draw – Doubles draw	(United States) Paul Annacone (United States) Mike De Palmer; 6–3, 5–7, 7–6	(United Kingdom) Neil Broad (South Africa) Stefan Kruger	(United Kingdom) Neil Broad (United States) Johan Kriek	(Australia) Mark Kratzmann (Australia) Brad Drewett (United States) Paul Annacone (United States) Martin Davis
24 Apr	São Paulo-2 Challenger; São Paulo, Brazil $25,000 – hard – 32S/16D; Singles draw – Doubles draw	(Canada) Martin Laurendeau; 7–6, 6–3	(Brazil) Dácio Campos	(United States) Ned Caswell (Brazil) Nelson Aerts	(United States) David Wheaton (Brazil) Givaldo Barbosa (United States) Dan Cassidy (Brazil) Roberto Jabali
24 Apr	São Paulo-2 Challenger; São Paulo, Brazil $25,000 – hard – 32S/16D; Singles draw – Doubles draw	(United States) Kent Kinnear (United States) David Wheaton; 6–3, 6–4	(Brazil) Nelson Aerts (Brazil) Marcos Hocevar	(United States) Ned Caswell (Brazil) Nelson Aerts	(United States) David Wheaton (Brazil) Givaldo Barbosa (United States) Dan Cassidy (Brazil) Roberto Jabali
24 Apr	Lisbon Challenger; Lisbon, Portugal $75,000 – clay – 32S/16D; Singles draw – Doubles draw	(Soviet Union) Andrei Cherkasov; 7–6, 6–3	(Spain) Tomás Carbonell	(Peru) Alejandro Aramburú (Czechoslovakia) Cyril Suk	(Spain) Francisco Roig (Jamaica) Doug Burke (Chile) Pedro Rebolledo (Argentina) Roberto Argüello
24 Apr	Lisbon Challenger; Lisbon, Portugal $75,000 – clay – 32S/16D; Singles draw – Doubles draw	(Spain) Carlos Costa (Spain) Tomás Carbonell; 6–4, 6–1	(Spain) Marcos Górriz (Spain) Vicente Solves	(Peru) Alejandro Aramburú (Czechoslovakia) Cyril Suk	(Spain) Francisco Roig (Jamaica) Doug Burke (Chile) Pedro Rebolledo (Argentina) Roberto Argüello
24 Apr	Nagoya Challenger; Nagoya, Japan $61,676 – hard – 32S/16D; Singles draw – Doubles draw	(India) Ramesh Krishnan; 6–1, 6–3	(United States) Jonathan Canter	(United Kingdom) Jeremy Bates (United Kingdom) Andrew Castle	(South Korea) Kim Bong-soo (South Korea) Yoo Jin-Sun (Japan) Shigeru Ota (United States) Bill Scanlon
24 Apr	Nagoya Challenger; Nagoya, Japan $61,676 – hard – 32S/16D; Singles draw – Doubles draw	(United States) John Letts (United States) Bruce Man-Son-Hing; 7–5, 4–6, 6–0	(United States) Jonathan Canter (India) Ramesh Krishnan	(United Kingdom) Jeremy Bates (United Kingdom) Andrew Castle	(South Korea) Kim Bong-soo (South Korea) Yoo Jin-Sun (Japan) Shigeru Ota (United States) Bill Scanlon

=== May ===
Week	Tournament	Champions	Runners-up	Semifinalists	Quarterfinalists
1 May	Johannesburg-1 Challenger; Johannesburg, South Africa $25,000 – hard – 32S/16D; Singles draw – Doubles draw	(South Africa) Piet Norval; 6–4, 6–2	(United Kingdom) James Turner	(United Kingdom) Neil Broad (South Africa) Eddie Edwards	(South Africa) Tertius Reynders (United States) Peter Palandjian (South Africa) Byron Talbot (South Africa) Stefan Kruger
1 May	Johannesburg-1 Challenger; Johannesburg, South Africa $25,000 – hard – 32S/16D; Singles draw – Doubles draw	(United States) Mike De Palmer (South Africa) Royce Deppe; 4–6, 6–3, 7–6	(South Africa) Piet Norval (South Africa) Byron Talbot	(United Kingdom) Neil Broad (South Africa) Eddie Edwards	(South Africa) Tertius Reynders (United States) Peter Palandjian (South Africa) Byron Talbot (South Africa) Stefan Kruger
1 May	Parioli Challenger; Parioli, Italy $25,000 – clay – 32S/16D; Singles draw – Doubles draw	(Italy) Stefano Pescosolido; 6–2, 6–4	(Austria) Oliver Fuchs	(Sweden) Lars Jönsson (Italy) Renzo Furlan	(Italy) Gianluca Pozzi (Italy) Edoardo Mazza (Italy) Massimiliano Narducci (Italy) Cristiano Caratti
1 May	Parioli Challenger; Parioli, Italy $25,000 – clay – 32S/16D; Singles draw – Doubles draw	(Italy) Massimo Cierro (Italy) Alessandro de Minicis; 6–4, 6–1	(Italy) Enrico Cocchi (Italy) Francesco Pisilli	(Sweden) Lars Jönsson (Italy) Renzo Furlan	(Italy) Gianluca Pozzi (Italy) Edoardo Mazza (Italy) Massimiliano Narducci (Italy) Cristiano Caratti
15 May	Raleigh Challenger; Raleigh, United States $25,000 – clay – 32S/16D; Singles draw – Doubles draw	(United States) Jimmy Brown; 6–4, 2–6, 6–4	(Canada) Martin Wostenholme	(United States) Mark Buckley (United States) Chuck Adams	(United States) Jared Palmer (United States) Greg Van Emburgh (United States) Robbie Weiss (Mexico) Agustín Moreno
15 May	Raleigh Challenger; Raleigh, United States $25,000 – clay – 32S/16D; Singles draw – Doubles draw	(United States) Charles Beckman (United States) Luke Jensen; 7–5, 6–4	(Netherlands) Paul Haarhuis (Belgium) Denis Langaskens	(United States) Mark Buckley (United States) Chuck Adams	(United States) Jared Palmer (United States) Greg Van Emburgh (United States) Robbie Weiss (Mexico) Agustín Moreno
15 May	Salzburg Challenger; Salzburg, Austria $75,000 – clay – 32S/16D; Singles draw – Doubles draw	(Socialist Federal Republic of Yugoslavia) Goran Prpić; 6–1, 6–2	(France) Éric Winogradsky	(Sweden) Johan Carlsson (Argentina) Gustavo Giussani	(Chile) Pedro Rebolledo (Argentina) Christian Miniussi (Austria) Oliver Fuchs (Sweden) Nicklas Kulti
15 May	Salzburg Challenger; Salzburg, Austria $75,000 – clay – 32S/16D; Singles draw – Doubles draw	(West Germany) Michael Stich (West Germany) Martin Sinner w/o	(Australia) Brett Custer (Australia) Simon Youl	(Sweden) Johan Carlsson (Argentina) Gustavo Giussani	(Chile) Pedro Rebolledo (Argentina) Christian Miniussi (Austria) Oliver Fuchs (Sweden) Nicklas Kulti

=== June ===
Week	Tournament	Champions	Runners-up	Semifinalists	Quarterfinalists
5 Jun	Modena Challenger; Modena, Italy $25,000 – clay – 32S/16D; Singles draw – Doubles draw	(Italy) Simone Colombo; 4–6, 6–3, 6–0	(Italy) Nevio Devide	(West Germany) Frank Dennhardt (Italy) Massimiliano Narducci	(Spain) José López-Maeso (Netherlands) Menno Oosting (Italy) Paolo Pambianco (Italy) Renzo Furlan
5 Jun	Modena Challenger; Modena, Italy $25,000 – clay – 32S/16D; Singles draw – Doubles draw	(Italy) Simone Colombo (Italy) Nevio Devide; 3–6, 6–1, 7–6	(Italy) Corrado Aprili (Italy) Massimiliano Narducci	(West Germany) Frank Dennhardt (Italy) Massimiliano Narducci	(Spain) José López-Maeso (Netherlands) Menno Oosting (Italy) Paolo Pambianco (Italy) Renzo Furlan
5 Jun	Montabaur Challenger; Montabaur, West Germany $25,000 – clay – 32S/16D; Singles draw – Doubles draw	(West Germany) Sascha Nensel; 6–3, 6–2	(West Germany) Jens Wöhrmann	(Spain) José Clavet (West Germany) Markus Rackl	(Switzerland) Roland Stadler (Soviet Union) Dimitri Poliakov (West Germany) Heiner Moraing (West Germany) Torben Theine
5 Jun	Montabaur Challenger; Montabaur, West Germany $25,000 – clay – 32S/16D; Singles draw – Doubles draw	(United Kingdom) Nick Fulwood (West Germany) Harald Rittersbacher; 7–5, 6–3	(West Germany) Karsten Braasch (West Germany) Dirk Leppen	(Spain) José Clavet (West Germany) Markus Rackl	(Switzerland) Roland Stadler (Soviet Union) Dimitri Poliakov (West Germany) Heiner Moraing (West Germany) Torben Theine
12 Jun	Dijon Challenger; Dijon, France $75,000 – carpet – 32S/16D; Singles draw – Doubles draw	(Canada) Martin Laurendeau; 4–6, 6–1, 7–6	(United States) Brad Pearce	(Australia) Peter Doohan (West Germany) Martin Sinner	(France) Philippe Pech (United States) Tom Mercer (Nigeria) Nduka Odizor (Venezuela) Maurice Ruah
12 Jun	Dijon Challenger; Dijon, France $75,000 – carpet – 32S/16D; Singles draw – Doubles draw	(Nigeria) Nduka Odizor (Kenya) Paul Wekesa; 6–4, 6–2	(United States) Brad Pearce (United States) Greg Van Emburgh	(Australia) Peter Doohan (West Germany) Martin Sinner	(France) Philippe Pech (United States) Tom Mercer (Nigeria) Nduka Odizor (Venezuela) Maurice Ruah
12 Jun	Manchester Open; Manchester, Great Britain $25,000 – grass – 32S/16D; Singles draw – Doubles draw	(West Germany) Patrick Baur; 6–4, 6–7, 7–5	(United Kingdom) Andrew Castle	(United States) John Letts (United Kingdom) Nick Fulwood	(South Africa) Piet Norval (United Kingdom) Stephen Botfield (United States) Scott Warner (Italy) Gianluca Pozzi
12 Jun	Manchester Open; Manchester, Great Britain $25,000 – grass – 32S/16D; Singles draw – Doubles draw	(United Kingdom) Nick Brown (United Kingdom) Nick Fulwood; 3–6, 7–6, 6–4	(Denmark) Morten Christensen (Republic of Ireland) Peter Wright	(United States) John Letts (United Kingdom) Nick Fulwood	(South Africa) Piet Norval (United Kingdom) Stephen Botfield (United States) Scott Warner (Italy) Gianluca Pozzi
12 Jun	Zaragoza Challenger; Zaragoza, Spain $50,000 – clay – 32S/16D; Singles draw – Doubles draw	(Socialist Federal Republic of Yugoslavia) Bruno Orešar; 6–4, 6–1	(Spain) Francisco Roig	(Sweden) Nicklas Utgren (Spain) Francisco Clavet	(Peru) Carlos di Laura (Sweden) Lars-Anders Wahlgren (United States) Robbie Weiss (Spain) José Luis Aparisi
12 Jun	Zaragoza Challenger; Zaragoza, Spain $50,000 – clay – 32S/16D; Singles draw – Doubles draw	(Spain) Carlos Costa (Peru) Carlos di Laura; 4–6, 7–6, 7–5	(Spain) Juan Carlos Báguena (Spain) Borja Uribe	(Sweden) Nicklas Utgren (Spain) Francisco Clavet	(Peru) Carlos di Laura (Sweden) Lars-Anders Wahlgren (United States) Robbie Weiss (Spain) José Luis Aparisi
19 Jun	Hossegor Challenger; Hossegor, France $75,000 – clay – 32S/16D; Singles draw – Doubles draw	(France) Thierry Tulasne; 6–3, 2–6, 6–1	(Socialist Federal Republic of Yugoslavia) Bruno Orešar	(Spain) Jordi Arrese (Soviet Union) Andres Võsand	(Sweden) David Engel (France) Jérôme Potier (West Germany) Tore Meinecke (Argentina) Guillermo Rivas
19 Jun	Hossegor Challenger; Hossegor, France $75,000 – clay – 32S/16D; Singles draw – Doubles draw	(Sweden) Peter Svensson (Sweden) Jörgen Windahl; 6–4, 7–5	(Sweden) David Engel (South Africa) Barry Moir	(Spain) Jordi Arrese (Soviet Union) Andres Võsand	(Sweden) David Engel (France) Jérôme Potier (West Germany) Tore Meinecke (Argentina) Guillermo Rivas
19 Jun	Salou Challenger; Salou, Spain $50,000 – clay – 32S/16D; Singles draw – Doubles draw	(Spain) Tomás Carbonell; 6–2, 6–4	(Sweden) Nicklas Utgren	(Spain) José Luis Aparisi (Netherlands) Hendrik Jan Davids	(Portugal) João Cunha e Silva (United States) Robbie Weiss (Spain) Borja Uribe (West Germany) Peter Ballauff
19 Jun	Salou Challenger; Salou, Spain $50,000 – clay – 32S/16D; Singles draw – Doubles draw	(Sweden) Conny Falk (United States) Robbie Weiss; 5–7, 7–6, 6–4	(Sweden) Per Henricsson (Sweden) Nicklas Utgren	(Spain) José Luis Aparisi (Netherlands) Hendrik Jan Davids	(Portugal) João Cunha e Silva (United States) Robbie Weiss (Spain) Borja Uribe (West Germany) Peter Ballauff
26 Jun	Clermont-Ferrand Challenger; Clermont-Ferrand, France $75,000 – clay – 32S/16D; Singles draw – Doubles draw	(France) Jérôme Potier; 6–4, 6–4	(West Germany) Ricki Osterthun	(Spain) Juan Aguilera (Spain) Carlos Costa	(Argentina) Roberto Argüello (Czechoslovakia) Jaroslav Bulant (West Germany) Karsten Braasch (France) Cédric Pioline
26 Jun	Clermont-Ferrand Challenger; Clermont-Ferrand, France $75,000 – clay – 32S/16D; Singles draw – Doubles draw	(Sweden) Peter Svensson (Sweden) Lars-Anders Wahlgren; 7–5, 6–3	(Argentina) Marcelo Ingaramo (Argentina) Gustavo Luza	(Spain) Juan Aguilera (Spain) Carlos Costa	(Argentina) Roberto Argüello (Czechoslovakia) Jaroslav Bulant (West Germany) Karsten Braasch (France) Cédric Pioline
26 Jun	Salerno Challenger; Salerno, Italy $25,000 – clay – 32S/16D; Singles draw – Doubles draw	(Italy) Claudio Pistolesi; 6–1, 6–7, 6–1	(Chile) José Antonio Fernández	(West Germany) Sascha Nensel (Italy) Alessandro de Minicis	(Switzerland) Stefano Mezzadri (West Germany) Frank Dennhardt (Belgium) Bart Wuyts (Italy) Fabio Di Mauro
26 Jun	Salerno Challenger; Salerno, Italy $25,000 – clay – 32S/16D; Singles draw – Doubles draw	(Italy) Nicola Bruno (Italy) Federico Mordegan; 7–6, 6–2	(Switzerland) Stefano Mezzadri (Italy) Ugo Pigato	(West Germany) Sascha Nensel (Italy) Alessandro de Minicis	(Switzerland) Stefano Mezzadri (West Germany) Frank Dennhardt (Belgium) Bart Wuyts (Italy) Fabio Di Mauro

=== July ===
Week	Tournament	Champions	Runners-up	Semifinalists	Quarterfinalists
3 Jul	Neu-Ulm Challenger; Neu-Ulm, West Germany $25,000 – clay – 32S/16D; Singles draw – Doubles draw	(West Germany) Ricki Osterthun; 5-1, Ret.	(Italy) Simone Colombo	(West Germany) Martin Sinner (West Germany) Christian Weis	(West Germany) Jens Wöhrmann (Italy) Renzo Furlan (West Germany) Sascha Nensel (West Germany) Torben Theine
3 Jul	Neu-Ulm Challenger; Neu-Ulm, West Germany $25,000 – clay – 32S/16D; Singles draw – Doubles draw	(Czechoslovakia) Jaroslav Navrátil (West Germany) Christian Weis; Walkover	(Italy) Simone Colombo (Italy) Nevio Devide	(West Germany) Martin Sinner (West Germany) Christian Weis	(West Germany) Jens Wöhrmann (Italy) Renzo Furlan (West Germany) Sascha Nensel (West Germany) Torben Theine
3 Jul	Rümikon Challenger; Rümikon, Switzerland $25,000 – clay – 32S/16D; Singles draw – Doubles draw	(West Germany) Markus Zoecke; 6–2, 6–2	(Argentina) Francisco Yunis	(Czechoslovakia) Radek Zahraj (Socialist Federal Republic of Yugoslavia) Marko Ostoja	(Belgium) Bart Wuyts (Switzerland) Roland Stadler (Switzerland) Marc Rosset (Sweden) Magnus Zeile
3 Jul	Rümikon Challenger; Rümikon, Switzerland $25,000 – clay – 32S/16D; Singles draw – Doubles draw	(Czechoslovakia) Libor Pimek (West Germany) Markus Zoecke; 6–3, 6–4	(Australia) Russell Barlow (West Germany) Harald Rittersbacher	(Czechoslovakia) Radek Zahraj (Socialist Federal Republic of Yugoslavia) Marko Ostoja	(Belgium) Bart Wuyts (Switzerland) Roland Stadler (Switzerland) Marc Rosset (Sweden) Magnus Zeile
10 Jul	Dublin Challenger; Dublin, Ireland $25,000 – carpet – 32S/16D; Singles draw – Doubles draw	(Sweden) Henrik Holm; 6–0, 4–6, 6–3	(Italy) Cristiano Caratti	(West Germany) Markus Zoecke (West Germany) Christian Geyer	(United States) Ken Flach (United States) John Letts (Switzerland) Marc Rosset (Australia) Russell Barlow
10 Jul	Dublin Challenger; Dublin, Ireland $25,000 – carpet – 32S/16D; Singles draw – Doubles draw	(Italy) Ugo Colombini (Kenya) Paul Wekesa; 6–4, 6–4	(United States) Ted Scherman (Republic of Ireland) Peter Wright	(West Germany) Markus Zoecke (West Germany) Christian Geyer	(United States) Ken Flach (United States) John Letts (Switzerland) Marc Rosset (Australia) Russell Barlow
10 Jul	São Paulo-3 Challenger; São Paulo, Brazil $25,000 – clay – 32S/16D; Singles draw – Doubles draw	(Brazil) Roberto Jabali; 6–2, 2–6, 7–5	(Spain) Borja Uribe	(Portugal) João Cunha e Silva (Brazil) Mauro Menezes	(Chile) Cristián Araya (Brazil) Otávio Della (Cuba) Juan Pino (Brazil) José Daher
10 Jul	São Paulo-3 Challenger; São Paulo, Brazil $25,000 – clay – 32S/16D; Singles draw – Doubles draw	(Australia) David Macpherson (Argentina) Gerardo Mirad; 2–6, 7–6, 6–2	(Brazil) Otávio Della (Brazil) Jaime Oncins	(Portugal) João Cunha e Silva (Brazil) Mauro Menezes	(Chile) Cristián Araya (Brazil) Otávio Della (Cuba) Juan Pino (Brazil) José Daher
10 Jul	Tampere Open; Tampere, Finland $75,000 – clay – 32S/16D; Singles draw – Doubles draw	(Sweden) Lars Jönsson; 7–5, 6–7, 6–4	(Soviet Union) Andres Võsand	(France) Olivier Soules (Finland) Aki Rahunen	(Sweden) Thomas Haldin (Belgium) Bart Wuyts (West Germany) Torben Theine (Italy) Renzo Furlan
10 Jul	Tampere Open; Tampere, Finland $75,000 – clay – 32S/16D; Singles draw – Doubles draw	(Sweden) Peter Svensson (Sweden) Lars-Anders Wahlgren; 7–5, 6–7, 6–3	(Sweden) Christer Allgårdh (Sweden) Tobias Svantesson	(France) Olivier Soules (Finland) Aki Rahunen	(Sweden) Thomas Haldin (Belgium) Bart Wuyts (West Germany) Torben Theine (Italy) Renzo Furlan
17 Jul	Franken Challenge; Fürth, West Germany $25,000 – clay – 32S/16D; Singles draw – Doubles draw	(Soviet Union) Dimitri Poliakov; 6–2, 6–1	(Italy) Federico Mordegan	(Germany) Jens Wöhrmann (Romania) Florin Segărceanu	(Switzerland) Marc Rosset (Germany) Markus Zoecke (Poland) Wojtek Kowalski (France) Fabrice Santoro
17 Jul	Franken Challenge; Fürth, West Germany $25,000 – clay – 32S/16D; Singles draw – Doubles draw	(Soviet Union) Vladimir Gabrichidze (Soviet Union) Dimitri Poliakov; 6–4, 6–7, 6–4	(Italy) Cristiano Caratti (Italy) Federico Mordegan	(Germany) Jens Wöhrmann (Romania) Florin Segărceanu	(Switzerland) Marc Rosset (Germany) Markus Zoecke (Poland) Wojtek Kowalski (France) Fabrice Santoro
17 Jul	Hanko Challenger; Hanko, Finland $50,000 – clay – 32S/16D; Singles draw – Doubles draw	(Finland) Aki Rahunen; 6–2, 6–0	(Soviet Union) Andres Võsand	(Sweden) Tobias Svantesson (Sweden) Nicklas Utgren	(Netherlands) Paul Dogger (Finland) Veli Paloheimo (Romania) Mihnea-Ion Năstase (United States) Mel Purcell
17 Jul	Hanko Challenger; Hanko, Finland $50,000 – clay – 32S/16D; Singles draw – Doubles draw	(Sweden) Per Henricsson (Sweden) Nicklas Utgren; 7–5, 6–7, 6–4	(Germany) Torben Theine (India) Srinivasan Vasudevan	(Sweden) Tobias Svantesson (Sweden) Nicklas Utgren	(Netherlands) Paul Dogger (Finland) Veli Paloheimo (Romania) Mihnea-Ion Năstase (United States) Mel Purcell
17 Jul	Chicoutimi Open; Chicoutimi, Canada $25,000 – clay – 32S/16D; Singles draw – Doubles draw	(Canada) Andrew Sznajder; 7–6, 1–6, 6–1	(Germany) Karsten Braasch	(United States) Martin Blackman (South Africa) Craig Campbell	(United States) Howard Endelman (Canada) Mark Greenan (United States) Jeff Cathrall (United States) Buff Farrow
17 Jul	Chicoutimi Open; Chicoutimi, Canada $25,000 – clay – 32S/16D; Singles draw – Doubles draw	(United States) Howard Endelman (United States) John Sobel; 3–6, 6–4, 6–4	(Germany) Karsten Braasch (Germany) Willi Otten	(United States) Martin Blackman (South Africa) Craig Campbell	(United States) Howard Endelman (Canada) Mark Greenan (United States) Jeff Cathrall (United States) Buff Farrow
17 Jul	Santos Challenger; Santos, Brazil $25,000 – clay – 32S/16D; Singles draw – Doubles draw	(Argentina) Gabriel Markus; 6–2, 6–2	(Argentina) Christian Miniussi	(Spain) José Francisco Altur (Brazil) Dácio Campos	(Brazil) Danilo Marcelino (Portugal) João Cunha-Silva (Spain) Borja Uribe (Brazil) Otávio Della
17 Jul	Santos Challenger; Santos, Brazil $25,000 – clay – 32S/16D; Singles draw – Doubles draw	(Chile) Cristián Araya (Chile) Pedro Rebolledo; 6–4, 4–6, 6–4	(Australia) David Macpherson (Argentina) Gerardo Mirad	(Spain) José Francisco Altur (Brazil) Dácio Campos	(Brazil) Danilo Marcelino (Portugal) João Cunha-Silva (Spain) Borja Uribe (Brazil) Otávio Della
24 Jul	Johannesburg-2 Challenger; Johannesburg, South Africa $50,000 – hard – 32S/16D; Singles draw – Doubles draw	(South Africa) Pieter Aldrich; 6–3, 6–3	(South Africa) Wayne Ferreira	(South Africa) Byron Talbot (South Africa) Danie Visser	(United States) Chuck Swayne (South Africa) Royce Deppe (South Africa) Marius Masencamp (United States) Greg Van Emburgh
24 Jul	Johannesburg-2 Challenger; Johannesburg, South Africa $50,000 – hard – 32S/16D; Singles draw – Doubles draw	(South Africa) Pieter Aldrich (South Africa) Danie Visser; 7–6, 6–4	(South Africa) David Adams (South Africa) Dean Botha	(South Africa) Byron Talbot (South Africa) Danie Visser	(United States) Chuck Swayne (South Africa) Royce Deppe (South Africa) Marius Masencamp (United States) Greg Van Emburgh
24 Jul	Comerica Bank Challenger; Aptos, United States $25,000 – hard – 32S/16D; Singles draw – Doubles draw	(South Africa) Mark Kaplan; 6–4, 6–4	(United States) Robbie Weiss	(United States) Jared Palmer (United States) Steve DeVries	(United States) Matt Anger (United States) Chuck Adams (United States) Jeff Klaparda (South Africa) Craig Campbell
24 Jul	Comerica Bank Challenger; Aptos, United States $25,000 – hard – 32S/16D; Singles draw – Doubles draw	(United States) Steve DeVries (United States) Ted Scherman; 6–3, 1–6, 6–2	(United States) Bryan Shelton (United States) Kenny Thorne	(United States) Jared Palmer (United States) Steve DeVries	(United States) Matt Anger (United States) Chuck Adams (United States) Jeff Klaparda (South Africa) Craig Campbell
24 Jul	Campos Challenger; Campos, Brazil $25,000 – clay – 32S/16D; Singles draw – Doubles draw	(Cuba) Mario Tabares; 7–6, 6–4	(Brazil) Danilo Marcelino	(Brazil) Alexandre Hocevar (Brazil) Mauro Menezes	(Brazil) Fernando Roese (Brazil) Ivan Kley (Brazil) Roberto Jabali (Argentina) Gerardo Mirad
24 Jul	Campos Challenger; Campos, Brazil $25,000 – clay – 32S/16D; Singles draw – Doubles draw	(Brazil) Nelson Aerts (Brazil) Fernando Roese; 6–3, 7–6	(Mexico) Stefan Dallwitz (Argentina) Daniel Orsanic	(Brazil) Alexandre Hocevar (Brazil) Mauro Menezes	(Brazil) Fernando Roese (Brazil) Ivan Kley (Brazil) Roberto Jabali (Argentina) Gerardo Mirad
31 Jul	Durban Challenger; Durban, South Africa $25,000 – hard – 32S/16D; Singles draw – Doubles draw	(South Africa) Marcos Ondruska; 6–4, 6–4	(Italy) Ugo Colombini	(Israel) Michael Daniel (South Africa) Grant Saacks	(Australia) Peter Doohan (South Africa) Byron Talbot (United States) Greg Van Emburgh (South Africa) Jason Sher
31 Jul	Durban Challenger; Durban, South Africa $25,000 – hard – 32S/16D; Singles draw – Doubles draw	(South Africa) Royce Deppe (South Africa) Byron Talbot; 6–2, 6–4	(South Africa) Brent Haygarth (South Africa) Earl Zinn	(Israel) Michael Daniel (South Africa) Grant Saacks	(Australia) Peter Doohan (South Africa) Byron Talbot (United States) Greg Van Emburgh (South Africa) Jason Sher
31 Jul	Geneva Open Challenger; Geneva, Switzerland $25,000 – clay – 32S/16D; Singles draw – Doubles draw	(Israel) Gilad Bloom; 6–1, 6–2	(France) Arnaud Boetsch	(Argentina) Fabián Blengino (Switzerland) Marc Rosset	(Sweden) Magnus Nilsson (Czech Republic) Slava Doseděl (France) Olivier Soules (France) Fabrice Santoro
31 Jul	Geneva Open Challenger; Geneva, Switzerland $25,000 – clay – 32S/16D; Singles draw – Doubles draw	(Germany) Peter Ballauff (Italy) Ugo Pigato; 6–4, 6–3	(France) Arnaud Boetsch (Czech Republic) Slava Doseděl	(Argentina) Fabián Blengino (Switzerland) Marc Rosset	(Sweden) Magnus Nilsson (Czech Republic) Slava Doseděl (France) Olivier Soules (France) Fabrice Santoro
31 Jul	Kuala Lumpur Challenger; Kuala Lumpur, Malaysia $25,000 – hard – 32S/16D; Singles draw – Doubles draw	(Australia) Neil Borwick; 6–3, 6–4	(Australia) Russell Barlow	(New Zealand) Steve Guy (South Korea) Bong-Soo Kim	(Australia) Broderick Dyke (United Kingdom) Andrew Castle (Indonesia) Tintus Wibowo (United Kingdom) James Turner
31 Jul	Kuala Lumpur Challenger; Kuala Lumpur, Malaysia $25,000 – hard – 32S/16D; Singles draw – Doubles draw	(India) Zeeshan Ali (New Zealand) Steve Guy; 6–4, 6–4	(Denmark) Morten Christensen (Denmark) Peter Flintsø	(New Zealand) Steve Guy (South Korea) Bong-Soo Kim	(Australia) Broderick Dyke (United Kingdom) Andrew Castle (Indonesia) Tintus Wibowo (United Kingdom) James Turner
31 Jul	Lins Challenger; Lins, Brazil $25,000 – clay – 32S/16D; Singles draw – Doubles draw	(Brazil) Jaime Oncins; 1–6, 6–0, 6–3	(Brazil) Fernando Roese	(Argentina) Christian Miniussi (Cuba) Mario Tabares	(Brazil) Nelson Aerts (Argentina) Gabriel Markus (Brazil) Otávio Della (Australia) David Macpherson
31 Jul	Lins Challenger; Lins, Brazil $25,000 – clay – 32S/16D; Singles draw – Doubles draw	(Australia) David Macpherson (Argentina) Gerardo Mirad; 2–6, 6–3, 6–2	(Portugal) João Cunha-Silva (Brazil) Ivan Kley	(Argentina) Christian Miniussi (Cuba) Mario Tabares	(Brazil) Nelson Aerts (Argentina) Gabriel Markus (Brazil) Otávio Della (Australia) David Macpherson
31 Jul	Seattle Challenger; Seattle, USA $25,000 – hard – 32S/16D; Singles draw – Doubles draw	(United States) MaliVai Washington; 7–6, 6–4	(United States) Robbie Weiss	(Finland) Olli Rahnasto (South Africa) Mark Kaplan	(United States) John Carras (United States) Matt Anger (United States) Kelly Jones (United States) Bryan Shelton
31 Jul	Seattle Challenger; Seattle, USA $25,000 – hard – 32S/16D; Singles draw – Doubles draw	(United States) Patrick Galbraith (United States) Brian Garrow; 6–1, 6–3	(Sweden) Ville Jansson (United States) Charles Merzbacher	(Finland) Olli Rahnasto (South Africa) Mark Kaplan	(United States) John Carras (United States) Matt Anger (United States) Kelly Jones (United States) Bryan Shelton

=== August ===
Week	Tournament	Champions	Runners-up	Semifinalists	Quarterfinalists
7 Aug	Pescara Challenger; Pescara, Italy $75,000 – clay – 32S/16D; Singles draw – Doubles draw	(Italy) Massimo Cierro; 6–3, 6–3	(Sweden) Magnus Larsson	(Spain) José Francisco Altur (Argentina) Pablo Albano	(Spain) Francisco Roig (Austria) Gilbert Schaller (Sweden) Nicklas Kulti (Italy) Massimiliano Narducci
7 Aug	Pescara Challenger; Pescara, Italy $75,000 – clay – 32S/16D; Singles draw – Doubles draw	(Sweden) David Engel (Sweden) Fredrik Nilsson; 6–2, 4–6, 7–6	(Sweden) Nicklas Kulti (Sweden) Magnus Larsson	(Spain) José Francisco Altur (Argentina) Pablo Albano	(Spain) Francisco Roig (Austria) Gilbert Schaller (Sweden) Nicklas Kulti (Italy) Massimiliano Narducci
7 Aug	Knokke Challenger; Knokke, Belgium $25,000 – clay – 32S/16D; Singles draw – Doubles draw	(Belgium) Libor Pimek; 7–6, 7–6	(Czech Republic) Radek Zahraj	(Germany) Peter Ballauff (Belgium) Bart Wuyts	(France) Olivier Soules (Belgium) Karel Demuynck (France) Stéphane Sansoni (Belgium) Xavier Daufresne
7 Aug	Knokke Challenger; Knokke, Belgium $25,000 – clay – 32S/16D; Singles draw – Doubles draw	(Belgium) Xavier Daufresne (Belgium) Denis Langaskens; 7–5, 6–2	(Belgium) Karel Demuynck (Belgium) Libor Pimek	(Germany) Peter Ballauff (Belgium) Bart Wuyts	(France) Olivier Soules (Belgium) Karel Demuynck (France) Stéphane Sansoni (Belgium) Xavier Daufresne
7 Aug	New Haven Challenger; New Haven, USA $25,000 – hard – 32S/16D; Singles draw – Doubles draw	(United States) Todd Martin; 6–3, 6–4	(United States) Buff Farrow	(United States) Brian Garrow (United States) Bryan Shelton	(United Kingdom) Mark Petchey (United States) Malcolm Allen (United States) Dan Goldberg (Venezuela) Alfonso Mora
7 Aug	New Haven Challenger; New Haven, USA $25,000 – hard – 32S/16D; Singles draw – Doubles draw	(United States) Brian Garrow (South Africa) Mark Kaplan; 6–4, 6–3	(South Africa) Craig Campbell (Philippines) Miguel Dungo	(United States) Brian Garrow (United States) Bryan Shelton	(United Kingdom) Mark Petchey (United States) Malcolm Allen (United States) Dan Goldberg (Venezuela) Alfonso Mora
7 Aug	São Paulo-4 Challenger; São Paulo, Brazil $25,000 – clay – 32S/16D; Singles draw – Doubles draw	(Chile) Pedro Rebolledo; 6–3, 6–2	(Brazil) Luiz Mattar	(Argentina) Gabriel Markus (Portugal) João Cunha-Silva	(Chile) Felipe Rivera (Italy) Michele Fioroni (Brazil) Ivan Kley (Brazil) Mauro Menezes
7 Aug	São Paulo-4 Challenger; São Paulo, Brazil $25,000 – clay – 32S/16D; Singles draw – Doubles draw	(Brazil) Nelson Aerts (Brazil) Fernando Roese; 2–6, 6–4, 6–4	(Brazil) Dácio Campos (Cuba) Mario Tabares	(Argentina) Gabriel Markus (Portugal) João Cunha-Silva	(Chile) Felipe Rivera (Italy) Michele Fioroni (Brazil) Ivan Kley (Brazil) Mauro Menezes
7 Aug	Jakarta Challenger; Jakarta, Indonesia $25,000 – hard – 32S/16D; Singles draw – Doubles draw	(United Kingdom) Nick Brown; 7–6, 6–4	(United Kingdom) James Turner	(Germany) Frank Dennhardt (United Kingdom) Andrew Castle	(Australia) Shane Barr (Australia) Todd Woodbridge (South Korea) Bong-Soo Kim (New Zealand) David Lewis
7 Aug	Jakarta Challenger; Jakarta, Indonesia $25,000 – hard – 32S/16D; Singles draw – Doubles draw	(Romania) Mihnea-Ion Năstase (United States) Brian Page; 3–6, 6–3, 7–6	(Australia) Neil Borwick (Australia) Stephen Furlong	(Germany) Frank Dennhardt (United Kingdom) Andrew Castle	(Australia) Shane Barr (Australia) Todd Woodbridge (South Korea) Bong-Soo Kim (New Zealand) David Lewis
14 Aug	Brasília-2 Challenger; Brasília, Brazil $75,000 – hard – 64S/32D; Singles draw – Doubles draw	(Cuba) Mario Tabares; 6–3, 6–2	(Brazil) Luiz Mattar	(Brazil) Fernando Roese (Brazil) Mauro Menezes	(Chile) Cristián Araya (Brazil) Danilo Marcelino (Argentina) Christian Miniussi (Brazil) Jaime Oncins
14 Aug	Brasília-2 Challenger; Brasília, Brazil $75,000 – hard – 64S/32D; Singles draw – Doubles draw	(Argentina) Horacio de la Peña (Australia) David Macpherson; 6–3, 7–5	(Brazil) Luis Ruette (Brazil) João Soares	(Brazil) Fernando Roese (Brazil) Mauro Menezes	(Chile) Cristián Araya (Brazil) Danilo Marcelino (Argentina) Christian Miniussi (Brazil) Jaime Oncins
14 Aug	Singapore Challenger; Singapore, Singapore $50,000 – hard – 32S/16D; Singles draw – Doubles draw	(Australia) Russell Barlow; 7–6, 4–6, 6–3	(Australia) Neil Borwick	(Kenya) Paul Wekesa (Australia) Desmond Tyson	(Australia) Broderick Dyke (New Zealand) Steve Guy (Philippines) Felix Barrientos (Germany) Frank Dennhardt
14 Aug	Singapore Challenger; Singapore, Singapore $50,000 – hard – 32S/16D; Singles draw – Doubles draw	(United Kingdom) Andrew Castle (Australia) Broderick Dyke; 7–6, 6–3	(United States) Steve DeVries (Kenya) Paul Wekesa	(Kenya) Paul Wekesa (Australia) Desmond Tyson	(Australia) Broderick Dyke (New Zealand) Steve Guy (Philippines) Felix Barrientos (Germany) Frank Dennhardt
14 Aug	Odrimont Challenger; Odrimont, Belgium $25,000 – clay – 32S/16D; Singles draw – Doubles draw	(Belgium) Bart Wuyts; 0–6, 6–3, 6–1	(France) Olivier Soules	(France) Stéphane Sansoni (Belgium) Libor Pimek	(Sweden) Tom Furukrantz (Austria) Gilbert Schaller (Czech Republic) Slava Doseděl (France) Patrice Kuchna
14 Aug	Odrimont Challenger; Odrimont, Belgium $25,000 – clay – 32S/16D; Singles draw – Doubles draw	(Belgium) Xavier Daufresne (Belgium) Denis Langaskens; 6–4, 6–2	(Sweden) Per Henricsson (India) Srinivasan Vasudevan	(France) Stéphane Sansoni (Belgium) Libor Pimek	(Sweden) Tom Furukrantz (Austria) Gilbert Schaller (Czech Republic) Slava Doseděl (France) Patrice Kuchna
14 Aug	Nielsen Pro Tennis Championship; Winnetka, United States $25,000 – hard – 32S/16D; Singles draw – Doubles draw	(United States) Brian Garrow; 6–4, 6–2	(United States) Todd Martin	(United States) Robbie Weiss (United States) Bryan Shelton	(United States) Scott Warner (United States) Tom Mercer (Sweden) Ville Jansson (United States) Steve Bryan
14 Aug	Nielsen Pro Tennis Championship; Winnetka, United States $25,000 – hard – 32S/16D; Singles draw – Doubles draw	(Sweden) Ville Jansson (United States) Scott Warner; 6–7, 6–4, 6–4	(United States) Bill Benjes (United States) Arkie Engle	(United States) Robbie Weiss (United States) Bryan Shelton	(United States) Scott Warner (United States) Tom Mercer (Sweden) Ville Jansson (United States) Steve Bryan
21 Aug	Goiânia Challenger; Goiânia, Brazil $25,000 – clay – 32S/16D; Singles draw – Doubles draw	(Argentina) Daniel Orsanic; 6–1, 3–6, 6–3	(Cuba) Juan Pino	(Brazil) Givaldo Barbosa (Brazil) João Zwetsch	(Brazil) Fernando Roese (Chile) Felipe Rivera (Brazil) William Kyriakos (Argentina) Agustín Garizzio
21 Aug	Goiânia Challenger; Goiânia, Brazil $25,000 – clay – 32S/16D; Singles draw – Doubles draw	(Brazil) Marcos Hocevar (Brazil) Alexandre Hocevar; 6–2, 6–2	(Brazil) Otávio Della (United States) Kevin Lubbers	(Brazil) Givaldo Barbosa (Brazil) João Zwetsch	(Brazil) Fernando Roese (Chile) Felipe Rivera (Brazil) William Kyriakos (Argentina) Agustín Garizzio
21 Aug	Hong Kong Challenger; Hong Kong, Hong Kong $25,000 – hard – 32S/16D; Singles draw – Doubles draw	(Australia) Johan Anderson; 7–5, 3–6, 6–4	(South Korea) Bong-Soo Kim	(New Zealand) Davis Lewis (United Kingdom) Nick Brown	(India) Zeeshan Ali (Australia) John Marinov (Denmark) Morten Christensen (New Zealand) Steve Guy
21 Aug	Hong Kong Challenger; Hong Kong, Hong Kong $25,000 – hard – 32S/16D; Singles draw – Doubles draw	(New Zealand) Steve Guy (New Zealand) Davis Lewis; 6–4, 6–2	(Australia) Russell Barlow (Australia) Gavin Pfitzner	(New Zealand) Davis Lewis (United Kingdom) Nick Brown	(India) Zeeshan Ali (Australia) John Marinov (Denmark) Morten Christensen (New Zealand) Steve Guy
28 Aug	Budapest Challenger; Budapest, Hungary $25,000 – clay – 32S/16D; Singles draw – Doubles draw	(Sweden) Per Henricsson; 7–5, 2–6, 7–6	(Czech Republic) Branislav Stankovič	(Belgium) Bart Wuyts (Czech Republic) Tomáš Anzari	(Romania) Florin Segărceanu (Hungary) András Lányi (Austria) Hans Priller (Denmark) Thomas Sørensen
28 Aug	Budapest Challenger; Budapest, Hungary $25,000 – clay – 32S/16D; Singles draw – Doubles draw	(Denmark) Peter Bastiansen (Sweden) Per Henricsson; 4–6, 6–4, 6–3	(Romania) George Cosac (Romania) Florin Segărceanu	(Belgium) Bart Wuyts (Czech Republic) Tomáš Anzari	(Romania) Florin Segărceanu (Hungary) András Lányi (Austria) Hans Priller (Denmark) Thomas Sørensen
28 Aug	Nyon Challenger; Nyon, Switzerland $25,000 – clay – 32S/16D; Singles draw – Doubles draw	(Switzerland) Marc Rosset; 7–6, 6–1	(Switzerland) Roland Stadler	(Sweden) Niclas Kroon (Portugal) João Cunha-Silva	(France) Stéphane Sansoni (Ecuador) Raúl Viver (Argentina) Fabián Blengino (Chile) Sergio Cortés
28 Aug	Nyon Challenger; Nyon, Switzerland $25,000 – clay – 32S/16D; Singles draw – Doubles draw	(United Kingdom) Nick Fulwood (Belgium) Libor Pimek; 6–4, 6–2	(Portugal) João Cunha-Silva (Australia) David Macpherson	(Sweden) Niclas Kroon (Portugal) João Cunha-Silva	(France) Stéphane Sansoni (Ecuador) Raúl Viver (Argentina) Fabián Blengino (Chile) Sergio Cortés
28 Aug	Verona Challenger; Verona, Italy $25,000 – clay – 32S/16D; Singles draw – Doubles draw	(Spain) José Clavet; 7–6, 7–6	(Spain) José Luis Aparisi	(Italy) Simone Colombo (Italy) Cristiano Caratti	(Belgium) Eduardo Masso (Spain) José Francisco Altur (Italy) Alessandro de Minicis (Italy) Federico Mordegan
28 Aug	Verona Challenger; Verona, Italy $25,000 – clay – 32S/16D; Singles draw – Doubles draw	(Spain) José Clavet (Spain) Francisco Clavet; 7–5, 6–4	(Italy) Corrado Aprili (New Zealand) Bruce Derlin	(Italy) Simone Colombo (Italy) Cristiano Caratti	(Belgium) Eduardo Masso (Spain) José Francisco Altur (Italy) Alessandro de Minicis (Italy) Federico Mordegan

=== September ===
Week	Tournament	Champions	Runners-up	Semifinalists	Quarterfinalists
4 Sep	Eger Challenger; Eger, Hungary $25,000 – clay – 32S/16D; Singles draw – Doubles draw	(Czech Republic) Richard Vogel; 2–6, 7–5, 6–1	(Belgium) Libor Pimek	(Sweden) Per Henricsson (Romania) Florin Segărceanu	(Czech Republic) Jaroslav Bulant (Soviet Union) Dimitri Poliakov (Sweden) Johan Kjellsten (Germany) Peter Ballauff
4 Sep	Eger Challenger; Eger, Hungary $25,000 – clay – 32S/16D; Singles draw – Doubles draw	(Czech Republic) Branislav Stankovič (Czech Republic) Richard Vogel; 6–4, 3–6, 7–5	(Romania) George Cosac (Romania) Florin Segărceanu	(Sweden) Per Henricsson (Romania) Florin Segărceanu	(Czech Republic) Jaroslav Bulant (Soviet Union) Dimitri Poliakov (Sweden) Johan Kjellsten (Germany) Peter Ballauff
4 Sep	Genova Challenger; Genova, Italy $25,000 – clay – 32S/16D; Singles draw – Doubles draw	(Sweden) Magnus Larsson; 6–1, 6–3	(New Zealand) Bruce Derlin	(Austria) Stefan Lochbihler (Argentina) Pablo Albano	(Spain) Francisco Clavet (Argentina) Gerardo Mirad (Italy) Alessandro de Minicis (Switzerland) Claudio Mezzadri
4 Sep	Genova Challenger; Genova, Italy $25,000 – clay – 32S/16D; Singles draw – Doubles draw	(France) Tarik Benhabiles (Brazil) Eduardo Furusho; 7–5, 6–2	(Italy) Emilio Marturano (Italy) Fabio Melegari	(Austria) Stefan Lochbihler (Argentina) Pablo Albano	(Spain) Francisco Clavet (Argentina) Gerardo Mirad (Italy) Alessandro de Minicis (Switzerland) Claudio Mezzadri
18 Sep	International Tournament of Messina; Messina, Italy $50,000 – clay – 32S/16D; Singles draw – Doubles draw	(Switzerland) Marc Rosset; 6–1, 6–1	(Sweden) Magnus Larsson	(Italy) Enrico Cocchi (Italy) Alessandro de Minicis	(Italy) Massimo Cierro (Ecuador) Raúl Viver (Sweden) Joakim Nyström (Czech Republic) Václav Roubíček
18 Sep	International Tournament of Messina; Messina, Italy $50,000 – clay – 32S/16D; Singles draw – Doubles draw	(Sweden) Magnus Larsson (Sweden) Joakim Nyström; 6–1, 6–1	(Italy) Massimo Cierro (Italy) Alessandro de Minicis	(Italy) Enrico Cocchi (Italy) Alessandro de Minicis	(Italy) Massimo Cierro (Ecuador) Raúl Viver (Sweden) Joakim Nyström (Czech Republic) Václav Roubíček
18 Sep	Thessaloniki Challenger; Thessaloniki, Greece $25,000 – hard – 32S/16D; Singles draw – Doubles draw	(New Zealand) Steve Guy; 6–4, 6–4	(Australia) Neil Borwick	(Israel) Michael Daniel (Germany) Claus Duppe	(United Kingdom) Nick Brown (Italy) Gianluca Pozzi (Greece) Tasos Bavelas (South Africa) Royce Deppe
18 Sep	Thessaloniki Challenger; Thessaloniki, Greece $25,000 – hard – 32S/16D; Singles draw – Doubles draw	(United Kingdom) Nick Brown (United Kingdom) Nick Fulwood; 6–2, 3–6, 7–6	(United Kingdom) Sean Cole (Netherlands) Jacco Van Duyn	(Israel) Michael Daniel (Germany) Claus Duppe	(United Kingdom) Nick Brown (Italy) Gianluca Pozzi (Greece) Tasos Bavelas (South Africa) Royce Deppe
25 Sep	Brisbane Challenger; Brisbane, Australia $25,000 – hard – 32S/16D; Singles draw – Doubles draw	(Australia) Todd Woodbridge; 7–6, 6–3	(United States) Scott Warner	(Australia) Peter Doohan (Sweden) Lars-Anders Wahlgren	(Australia) Mark Kratzmann (Brazil) Nelson Aerts (Germany) Lars Koslowski (United States) Joseph Russell
25 Sep	Brisbane Challenger; Brisbane, Australia $25,000 – hard – 32S/16D; Singles draw – Doubles draw	(Australia) Brett Custer (Australia) Desmond Tyson; 7–6, 6–4	(Australia) Shane Barr (United States) Ted Scherman	(Australia) Peter Doohan (Sweden) Lars-Anders Wahlgren	(Australia) Mark Kratzmann (Brazil) Nelson Aerts (Germany) Lars Koslowski (United States) Joseph Russell

=== October ===
Week	Tournament	Champions	Runners-up	Semifinalists	Quarterfinalists
2 Oct	Casablanca-2 Challenger; Casablanca, Morocco $50,000 – clay – 32S/16D; Singles draw – Doubles draw	(France) Tarik Benhabiles; 7–6, 6–3	(Netherlands) Mark Koevermans	(United States) Lawson Duncan (Czechoslovakia) Richard Vogel	(West Germany) Hans Schwaier (Soviet Union) Andres Võsand (Argentina) Gustavo Giussani (Argentina) Gabriel Markus
2 Oct	Casablanca-2 Challenger; Casablanca, Morocco $50,000 – clay – 32S/16D; Singles draw – Doubles draw	(Czechoslovakia) Jaroslav Bulant (Czechoslovakia) Richard Vogel; 6–4, 3–6, 7–5	(Belgium) Libor Pimek (Romania) Florin Segărceanu	(United States) Lawson Duncan (Czechoslovakia) Richard Vogel	(West Germany) Hans Schwaier (Soviet Union) Andres Võsand (Argentina) Gustavo Giussani (Argentina) Gabriel Markus
2 Oct	Bogotá Challenger; Bogotá, Colombia $25,000 – clay – 32S/16D; Singles draw – Doubles draw	(Colombia) Mauricio Hadad; 6–3, 6–7, 6–4	(Argentina) Guillermo Minutella	(Mexico) Agustín Moreno (Ecuador) Giorgio Carneade	(Ecuador) Andrés Alarcón (Mexico) Alain Lemaitre (Colombia) Jaime Cortés (West Germany) Markus Hintermeier
2 Oct	Bogotá Challenger; Bogotá, Colombia $25,000 – clay – 32S/16D; Singles draw – Doubles draw	(Mexico) Roberto López (Mexico) Alain Lemaitre; 3–6, 6–3, 6–0	(Venezuela) Carlos Claverie (Venezuela) Alfonso Mora	(Mexico) Agustín Moreno (Ecuador) Giorgio Carneade	(Ecuador) Andrés Alarcón (Mexico) Alain Lemaitre (Colombia) Jaime Cortés (West Germany) Markus Hintermeier
2 Oct	Coquitlam Challenger; Coquitlam, Canada $25,000 – hard – 32S/16D; Singles draw – Doubles draw	(Sweden) Ville Jansson; 6–4, 6–2	(Canada) Chris Pridham	(United States) Brian Joelson (United States) Steve DeVries	(United States) Patrick Galbraith (United States) Joey Rive (United States) John Sobel (United States) Malcolm Allen
2 Oct	Coquitlam Challenger; Coquitlam, Canada $25,000 – hard – 32S/16D; Singles draw – Doubles draw	(United States) Patrick Galbraith (United States) Brian Garrow; 4–6, 6–4, 6–4	(United States) Ned Caswell (United States) Chris Garner	(United States) Brian Joelson (United States) Steve DeVries	(United States) Patrick Galbraith (United States) Joey Rive (United States) John Sobel (United States) Malcolm Allen
9 Oct	Nicosia Challenger; Nicosia, Cyprus $25,000 – clay – 32S/16D; Singles draw – Doubles draw	(Czechoslovakia) Jaroslav Bulant; 6–3, 6–4	(West Germany) Markus Zillner	(Italy) Massimo Cierro (India) Srinivasan Vasudevan	(Sweden) Thomas Haldin (Spain) Emilio Benfele Álvarez (West Germany) Bernd Karbacher (Spain) José Antonio Conde
9 Oct	Nicosia Challenger; Nicosia, Cyprus $25,000 – clay – 32S/16D; Singles draw – Doubles draw	(Romania) Mihnea-Ion Năstase (India) Srinivasan Vasudevan; 6–3, 6–7, 6–1	(United Kingdom) Sean Cole (United Kingdom) Nick Fulwood	(Italy) Massimo Cierro (India) Srinivasan Vasudevan	(Sweden) Thomas Haldin (Spain) Emilio Benfele Álvarez (West Germany) Bernd Karbacher (Spain) José Antonio Conde
16 Oct	Challenger La Manche; Cherbourg, France $50,000 – hard (I) – 32S/16D; Singles draw – Doubles draw	(Finland) Veli Paloheimo; 3–6, 6–3, 6–2	(Canada) Martin Laurendeau	(France) Jérôme Potier (Denmark) Michael Tauson	(Canada) Chris Pridham (Spain) Borja Uribe (France) Olivier Delaître (France) Éric Winogradsky
16 Oct	Challenger La Manche; Cherbourg, France $50,000 – hard (I) – 32S/16D; Singles draw – Doubles draw	(Sweden) Ronnie Båthman (United Kingdom) Andrew Castle; 6–2, 6–3	(Finland) Olli Rahnasto (Netherlands) Johan Vekemans	(France) Jérôme Potier (Denmark) Michael Tauson	(Canada) Chris Pridham (Spain) Borja Uribe (France) Olivier Delaître (France) Éric Winogradsky
23 Oct	Brest Challenger; Brest, France $50,000 – hard (I) – 32S/16D; Singles draw – Doubles draw	(Finland) Veli Paloheimo; 6–2, 6–2	(France) Olivier Delaître	(France) Cédric Pioline (West Germany) Udo Riglewski	(Soviet Union) Ģirts Dzelde (Nigeria) Nduka Odizor (France) Philippe Pech (France) Fabrice Santoro
23 Oct	Brest Challenger; Brest, France $50,000 – hard (I) – 32S/16D; Singles draw – Doubles draw	(United States) Patrick Galbraith (United States) Joey Rive; 6–4, 6–1	(France) Olivier Delaître (France) Thierry Tulasne	(France) Cédric Pioline (West Germany) Udo Riglewski	(Soviet Union) Ģirts Dzelde (Nigeria) Nduka Odizor (France) Philippe Pech (France) Fabrice Santoro
23 Oct	Johannesburg-3 Challenger; Johannesburg, South Africa $25,000 – grass – 32S/16D; Singles draw – Doubles draw	(United States) Paul Koscielski; 6–3, 6–3	(South Africa) Wayne Ferreira	(United Kingdom) Neil Broad (South Africa) Lan Bale	(West Germany) Milan Palme (South Africa) Piet Norval (South Africa) Marius Barnard (South Africa) Brent Haygarth
23 Oct	Johannesburg-3 Challenger; Johannesburg, South Africa $25,000 – grass – 32S/16D; Singles draw – Doubles draw	(South Africa) Lan Bale (South Africa) David Nainkin; 4–6, 6–4, 6–2	(United Kingdom) Neil Broad (South Africa) Stefan Kruger	(United Kingdom) Neil Broad (South Africa) Lan Bale	(West Germany) Milan Palme (South Africa) Piet Norval (South Africa) Marius Barnard (South Africa) Brent Haygarth
30 Oct	Bahia Challenger; Bahia, Brazil $75,000 – hard – 32S/16D; Singles draw – Doubles draw	(Australia) Richard Fromberg; 3–6, 6–3, 6–2	(France) Jean-Philippe Fleurian	(Spain) Javier Sánchez (Uruguay) Marcelo Filippini	(Israel) Gilad Bloom (Spain) José Francisco Altur (Brazil) Otávio Della (Brazil) Mauro Menezes
30 Oct	Bahia Challenger; Bahia, Brazil $75,000 – hard – 32S/16D; Singles draw – Doubles draw	(Argentina) Javier Frana (Brazil) Cássio Motta; 6–4, 6–2	(Spain) Sergio Casal (Spain) Javier Sánchez	(Spain) Javier Sánchez (Uruguay) Marcelo Filippini	(Israel) Gilad Bloom (Spain) José Francisco Altur (Brazil) Otávio Della (Brazil) Mauro Menezes
30 Oct	Bergen Challenger; Bergen, Norway $75,000 – carpet – 32S/16D; Singles draw – Doubles draw	(Sweden) Jan Gunnarsson; 6–3, 7–6	(United States) Brad Pearce	(United States) Kelly Jones (Sweden) Nicklas Kulti	(Sweden) Lars Jönsson (West Germany) Udo Riglewski (West Germany) Alexander Mronz (Sweden) Rikard Bergh
30 Oct	Bergen Challenger; Bergen, Norway $75,000 – carpet – 32S/16D; Singles draw – Doubles draw	(Canada) Grant Connell (United States) Scott Warner; 4–6, 6–4, 6–2	(Sweden) Rikard Bergh (United States) Kelly Jones	(United States) Kelly Jones (Sweden) Nicklas Kulti	(Sweden) Lars Jönsson (West Germany) Udo Riglewski (West Germany) Alexander Mronz (Sweden) Rikard Bergh
30 Oct	Beijing Challenger; Beijing, China $25,000 – hard – 32S/16D; Singles draw – Doubles draw	(South Korea) Bong-Soo Kim; 6–4, 6–2	(Australia) Bruce Derlin	(China) Jia-Ping Xia (United States) David Harkness	(South Korea) Dong-Wook Song (South Korea) Kim Jae-sik (Japan) Toshihisa Tsuchihashi (United States) Otis Smith
30 Oct	Beijing Challenger; Beijing, China $25,000 – hard – 32S/16D; Singles draw – Doubles draw	(India) Zeeshan Ali (Australia) Bruce Derlin; 6–4, 6–4	(United States) Brian Devening (United States) Craig Johnson	(China) Jia-Ping Xia (United States) David Harkness	(South Korea) Dong-Wook Song (South Korea) Kim Jae-sik (Japan) Toshihisa Tsuchihashi (United States) Otis Smith

=== November ===
Week	Tournament	Champions	Runners-up	Semifinalists	Quarterfinalists
6 Nov	Cape Town-2 Challenger; Cape Town, South Africa $50,000 – hard – 32S/16D; Singles draw – Doubles draw	(South Africa) Mark Kaplan; 6–2, 6–1	(South Africa) Dean Botha	(United States) David Pate (United States) Mark Keil	(South Africa) Piet Norval (South Africa) Michael Robertson (United States) Joey Rive (South Africa) Kevin Moir
6 Nov	Cape Town-2 Challenger; Cape Town, South Africa $50,000 – hard – 32S/16D; Singles draw – Doubles draw	(United States) Kelly Jones (United States) Joey Rive; 6–3, 6–4	(United States) David Pate (United States) Robert Van't Hof	(United States) David Pate (United States) Mark Keil	(South Africa) Piet Norval (South Africa) Michael Robertson (United States) Joey Rive (South Africa) Kevin Moir
6 Nov	Bossonnens Challenger; Bossonnens, Switzerland $25,000 – hard (I) – 32S/16D; Singles draw – Doubles draw	(The Bahamas) Roger Smith; 7–6, 6–7, 6–4	(Czech Republic) Petr Korda	(United States) Kent Kinnear (United States) Arkie Engle	(Nigeria) Nduka Odizor (Switzerland) Marc Rosset (France) Stéphane Grenier (France) Laurent Prades
6 Nov	Bossonnens Challenger; Bossonnens, Switzerland $25,000 – hard (I) – 32S/16D; Singles draw – Doubles draw	(United States) Bret Garnett (United States) Kent Kinnear; 7–6, 6–3	(United States) Brett Dickinson (United States) Bryan Shelton	(United States) Kent Kinnear (United States) Arkie Engle	(Nigeria) Nduka Odizor (Switzerland) Marc Rosset (France) Stéphane Grenier (France) Laurent Prades
13 Nov	Valkenswaard Challenger; Valkenswaard, The Netherlands $75,000 – carpet (I) – 32S/16D; Singles draw – Doubles draw	(France) Éric Winogradsky; 3–6, 6–3, 6–4	(Germany) Markus Zoecke	(Australia) Darren Cahill (Czech Republic) Milan Šrejber	(United States) Dan Goldie (Germany) Udo Riglewski (Germany) Michael Stich (Soviet Union) Andrei Olhovskiy
13 Nov	Valkenswaard Challenger; Valkenswaard, The Netherlands $75,000 – carpet (I) – 32S/16D; Singles draw – Doubles draw	(Netherlands) Tom Nijssen (Germany) Udo Riglewski; 4–6, 6–2, 6–1	(Czech Republic) Karel Nováček (Czech Republic) Marián Vajda	(Australia) Darren Cahill (Czech Republic) Milan Šrejber	(United States) Dan Goldie (Germany) Udo Riglewski (Germany) Michael Stich (Soviet Union) Andrei Olhovskiy
13 Nov	Helsinki Challenger; Helsinki, Finland $50,000 – carpet (I) – 32S/16D; Singles draw – Doubles draw	(Sweden) David Engel; 4–6, 6–7, 6–1	(Finland) Veli Paloheimo	(Australia) Broderick Dyke (Sweden) Jörgen Windahl	(United States) Tim Wilkison (Sweden) Nicklas Utgren (United States) Jonathan Canter (Germany) Patrick Baur
13 Nov	Helsinki Challenger; Helsinki, Finland $50,000 – carpet (I) – 32S/16D; Singles draw – Doubles draw	(Sweden) Rikard Bergh (Sweden) Per Henricsson; 7–6, 6–3	(Czech Republic) David Rikl (Czech Republic) Tomáš Anzari	(Australia) Broderick Dyke (Sweden) Jörgen Windahl	(United States) Tim Wilkison (Sweden) Nicklas Utgren (United States) Jonathan Canter (Germany) Patrick Baur
13 Nov	Rio de Janeiro Challenger; Rio de Janeiro, Brazil $25,000 – hard – 32S/16D; Singles draw – Doubles draw	(Brazil) Luiz Mattar; 6–4, 6–3	(Spain) Francisco Roig	(Peru) Pablo Arraya (Brazil) Cássio Motta	(Spain) Javier Sánchez (Australia) Richard Fromberg (France) Jean-Philippe Fleurian (Spain) José Clavet
13 Nov	Rio de Janeiro Challenger; Rio de Janeiro, Brazil $25,000 – hard – 32S/16D; Singles draw – Doubles draw	(United States) Charles Beckman (United States) Shelby Cannon; 6–3, 6–2	(Brazil) Dácio Campos (Brazil) Luiz Mattar	(Peru) Pablo Arraya (Brazil) Cássio Motta	(Spain) Javier Sánchez (Australia) Richard Fromberg (France) Jean-Philippe Fleurian (Spain) José Clavet
20 Nov	Copenhagen Open; Copenhagen, Denmark $75,000 – carpet (I) – 32S/16D; Singles draw – Doubles draw	(Czech Republic) Milan Šrejber; 7–5, 7–6	(Switzerland) Marc Rosset	(United States) Patrick McEnroe (Sweden) Christian Bergström	(Denmark) Michael Tauson (Netherlands) Tom Nijssen (United States) Tim Wilkison (Czech Republic) Marián Vajda
20 Nov	Copenhagen Open; Copenhagen, Denmark $75,000 – carpet (I) – 32S/16D; Singles draw – Doubles draw	(Sweden) Nicklas Kulti (Sweden) Magnus Larsson; 6–3, 6–2	(Austria) Alex Antonitsch (Netherlands) Ronnie Båthman	(United States) Patrick McEnroe (Sweden) Christian Bergström	(Denmark) Michael Tauson (Netherlands) Tom Nijssen (United States) Tim Wilkison (Czech Republic) Marián Vajda
20 Nov	Munich Challenger; Munich, West Germany $50,000 – carpet (I) – 32S/16D; Singles draw – Doubles draw	(United States) Bryan Shelton; 6–4, 7–5	(Italy) Gianluca Pozzi	(Germany) Peter Ballauff (France) Philippe Pech	(Germany) Arne Thoms (France) Cédric Pioline (Nigeria) Nduka Odizor (Netherlands) Ralph Kok
20 Nov	Munich Challenger; Munich, West Germany $50,000 – carpet (I) – 32S/16D; Singles draw – Doubles draw	(Sweden) Tomas Nydahl (Sweden) Peter Nyborg; 6–2, 1–6, 7–6	(Czech Republic) Jaroslav Bulant (Italy) Gianluca Pozzi	(Germany) Peter Ballauff (France) Philippe Pech	(Germany) Arne Thoms (France) Cédric Pioline (Nigeria) Nduka Odizor (Netherlands) Ralph Kok
20 Nov	Tasmania Challenger; Tasmania, Australia $25,000 – carpet – 32S/16D; Singles draw – Doubles draw	(Australia) Todd Woodbridge; 6–3, 1–6, 6–2	(Australia) Mark Kratzmann	(Australia) Darren Patten (Australia) Roger Rasheed	(New Zealand) Brett Steven (Australia) Jason Cask (Australia) Jamie Morgan (Australia) Gavin Pfitzner
20 Nov	Tasmania Challenger; Tasmania, Australia $25,000 – carpet – 32S/16D; Singles draw – Doubles draw	(Australia) Jamie Morgan (Australia) Todd Woodbridge; 7–6, 7–6	(Australia) Roger Rasheed (Australia) Carl Turich	(Australia) Darren Patten (Australia) Roger Rasheed	(New Zealand) Brett Steven (Australia) Jason Cask (Australia) Jamie Morgan (Australia) Gavin Pfitzner
27 Nov	Brasília-3 Challenger; Brasília, Brazil $75,000 – hard – 32S/16D; Singles draw – Doubles draw	(Uruguay) Marcelo Filippini; 6–2, 6–4	(United States) Tim Wilkison	(France) Jean-Philippe Fleurian (Netherlands) Paul Haarhuis	(Argentina) Javier Frana (Argentina) Christian Miniussi (United States) MaliVai Washington (United States) Jeff Tarango
27 Nov	Brasília-3 Challenger; Brasília, Brazil $75,000 – hard – 32S/16D; Singles draw – Doubles draw	(United States) Charles Beckman (France) Jean-Philippe Fleurian; 4–6, 6–3, 6–0	(Argentina) Javier Frana (Argentina) Gustavo Luza	(France) Jean-Philippe Fleurian (Netherlands) Paul Haarhuis	(Argentina) Javier Frana (Argentina) Christian Miniussi (United States) MaliVai Washington (United States) Jeff Tarango

=== December ===
Week	Tournament	Champions	Runners-up	Semifinalists	Quarterfinalists
4 Dec	São Paulo-5 Challenger; São Paulo, Brazil $25,000 – clay – 32S/16D; Singles draw – Doubles draw	(Chile) Sergio Cortés; 6–4, 6–3	(Argentina) Francisco Yunis	(United States) Jeff Tarango (Argentina) Roberto Argüello	(France) Jean-Philippe Fleurian (Argentina) Gustavo Giussani (Belgium) Eduardo Masso (Brazil) Jaime Oncins
4 Dec	São Paulo-5 Challenger; São Paulo, Brazil $25,000 – clay – 32S/16D; Singles draw – Doubles draw	(Brazil) Luiz Mattar (Brazil) Cássio Motta; 7–5, 6–2	(Cuba) Juan Pino (Cuba) Mario Tabares	(United States) Jeff Tarango (Argentina) Roberto Argüello	(France) Jean-Philippe Fleurian (Argentina) Gustavo Giussani (Belgium) Eduardo Masso (Brazil) Jaime Oncins

== See also ==
- 1989 Grand Prix
- Association of Tennis Professionals
- International Tennis Federation
