= 1989 French Open – Mixed doubles =

Mixed doubles
- 1989 French Open

Final
- Champion: (Netherlands) Manon Bollegraf (Netherlands) Tom Nijssen
- Runner-up: (Argentina) Horacio de la Peña (Spain) Arantxa Sánchez Vicario
- Score: 6–3, 6–7^{(3–7)}, 6–2

Details
- Draw: 56
- Seeds: 8

Events
Singles	men	women		boys	girls
Doubles	men	women	mixed	boys	girls
WC Singles	men	women	quad
WC Doubles	men	women	quad
Legends	−45	45+	women
- French Open

The mixed doubles tournament at the 1989 French Open was held from 29 May until 11 June 1989 on the outdoor clay courts at the Stade Roland Garros in Paris, France. Manon Bollegraf and Tom Nijssen won the title, defeating Horacio de la Peña and Arantxa Sánchez Vicario in the final.

== Seeds ==
1. (United States) Rick Leach / (United States) Zina Garrison (semifinals)
2. (United States) Jim Grabb / (United States) Robin White (semifinals)
3. (Spain) Sergio Casal / (United States) Betsy Nagelsen (quarterfinals)
4. (Australia) Peter Doohan / (Australia) Janine Tremelling (third round)
5. (United States) Patrick McEnroe / (United States) Gigi Fernández (quarterfinals)
6. (Netherlands) Tom Nijssen / (Netherlands) Manon Bollegraf (champions)
7. (Australia) Mark Woodforde / (United States) Terry Phelps (second round)
8. (Australia) Darren Cahill / (Australia) Nicole Provis (quarterfinals)

== Draw ==
Key

- Q = Qualifier
- WC = Wild card
- LL = Lucky loser
- Alt = Alternate
- ITF = ITF entry
- PR = Protected ranking
- SR = Special ranking
- SE = Special exempt
- JE = Junior exempt
- JR = Junior Accelerator Programme entrant
- CO = College Accelerator Programme entrant
- NG = Next Gen Accelerator Program entrant
- w/o = Walkover
- r = Retired
- d = Defaulted

=== Finals ===
Quarterfinals
1	(United States) Rick Leach (United States) Zina Garrison	7	7
(United States) Blaine Willenborg (United States) Penny Barg	6^{3}	6^{3}
4	(United States) Patrick McEnroe (United States) Gigi Fernández	4	1
(Argentina) Horacio de la Peña (Spain) Arantxa Sánchez Vicario	6	6
6	(Netherlands) Tom Nijssen (Netherlands) Manon Bollegraf	6	4	6
3	(Spain) Sergio Casal (United States) Betsy Nagelsen	1	6	1
8	(Australia) Darren Cahill (Australia) Nicole Provis	6	2	3
2	(United States) Jim Grabb (United States) Robin White	1	6	6

Semifinals
1	(United States) Rick Leach (United States) Zina Garrison	6^{5}	6	9
(Argentina) Horacio de la Peña (Spain) Arantxa Sánchez Vicario	7	4	11
6	(Netherlands) Tom Nijssen (Netherlands) Manon Bollegraf	6	7
2	(United States) Jim Grabb (United States) Robin White	1	5

Final
(Argentina) Horacio de la Peña (Spain) Arantxa Sánchez Vicario	3	7	2
6	(Netherlands) Tom Nijssen (Netherlands) Manon Bollegraf	6	6^{3}	6

=== Top half ===
==== Section 1 ====
First round
(Brazil) C Motta (Brazil) N Dias	6^{6}	7	4
(France) A Boetsch (France) S Amiach	7	5	6
(United States) B Man-Son-Hing (United States) C Benjamin	3	5
(Australia) T Woodbridge (Australia) R McQuillan	6	7
(Chile) P Rodríguez (Austria) H Sprung	3	0
(Czechoslovakia) C Suk (Czechoslovakia) H Suková	6	6
(Denmark) M Mortensen (Denmark) T Scheuer-Larsen	4	4
(Netherlands) M Schapers (Netherlands) B Schultz	6	6
(France) F Errard (France) N van Lottum	1	1
(United States) B Willenborg (United States) P Barg	6	6
(France) F Santoro (France) A Dechaume	w/o
(Argentina) F Blengino (Chile) N Rodríguez

Second round
1	(United States) R Leach (United States) Z Garrison	6	6
(France) A Boetsch (France) S Amiach	4	2
(Australia) T Woodbridge (Australia) R McQuillan
(Czechoslovakia) C Suk (Czechoslovakia) H Suková	w/o
(Netherlands) M Schapers (Netherlands) B Schultz	3	5
(United States) B Willenborg (United States) P Barg	6	7
(France) F Santoro (France) A Dechaume	6	6
7	(Australia) M Woodforde (United States) T Phelps	3	4

Third round
1	(United States) R Leach (United States) Z Garrison	6	6
(Czechoslovakia) C Suk (Czechoslovakia) H Suková	4	4
(United States) B Willenborg (United States) P Barg	4	6	6
(France) F Santoro (France) A Dechaume	6	0	2

Quarterfinals
1	(United States) R Leach (United States) Z Garrison	7	7
(United States) B Willenborg (United States) P Barg	6^{3}	6^{3}

==== Section 2 ====
First round
(The Bahamas) R Smith (United States) S Stafford	1	7	6
(France) JP Fleurian (United States) S Collins	6	5	4
(Spain) T Carbonell (Switzerland) C Cohen	6	4	6
(Netherlands) P Haarhuis (Netherlands) C Bakkum	4	6	4
(United States) J Letts (United States) C MacGregor	4	2
(Socialist Federal Republic of Yugoslavia) G Ivanišević (Socialist Federal Republic of Yugoslavia) S Goleš	6	6
(Mexico) L Lavalle (Argentina) M Paz	7	3	4
(Argentina) H de la Peña (Spain) A Sánchez Vicario	5	6	6
(Nigeria) N Odizor (United States) K Adams	6	3	8
(France) O Delaître (France) N Herreman	3	6	6
(Brazil) R Acioly (United States) R Reis	3	1
(United States) B Pearce (United States) C Reynolds	6	6

Second round
4	(United States) P McEnroe (United States) G Fernández	6	6
(The Bahamas) R Smith (United States) S Stafford	4	2
(Spain) T Carbonell (Switzerland) C Cohen	6^{5}	4
(Socialist Federal Republic of Yugoslavia) G Ivanišević (Socialist Federal Republic of Yugoslavia) S Goleš	7	6
(Argentina) H de la Peña (Spain) A Sánchez Vicario	6	6
(Nigeria) N Odizor (United States) K Adams	3	1
(United States) B Pearce (United States) C Reynolds	4	1
5	(Australia) P Doohan (Australia) J Tremelling	6	6

Third round
4	(United States) P McEnroe (United States) G Fernández	6	7
(Socialist Federal Republic of Yugoslavia) G Ivanišević (Socialist Federal Republic of Yugoslavia) S Goleš	4	5
(Argentina) H de la Peña (Spain) A Sánchez Vicario	6	6
5	(Australia) P Doohan (Australia) J Tremelling	4	4

Quarterfinals
4	(United States) P McEnroe (United States) G Fernández	4	1
(Argentina) H de la Peña (Spain) A Sánchez Vicario	6	6

=== Bottom half ===
==== Section 3 ====
First round
(France) É Winogradsky (France) C Suire	6^{6}	7	6
(Australia) B Dyke (Australia) M Jaggard	7	6^{4}	2
(Argentina) G Luza (Argentina) P Tarabini	7	6
(United States) M De Palmer (United States) L McNeil	5	2
(France) L Courteau (France) J Halard	4	6^{5}
(Australia) L Warder (Australia) L Field	6	7
(South Africa) S Kruger (South Africa) L Gregory	6	6
(Czechoslovakia) M Vajda (Austria) J Wiesner	3	1
(Sweden) T Svantesson (West Germany) C Schneider	1	1
(France) T Champion (France) P Etchemendy	6	6
(Spain) B Uribe (Argentina) B Fulco	6	7
(France) C Pioline (France) N Guerrée	2	5

Second round
6	(Netherlands) T Nijssen (Netherlands) M Bollegraf	6	4	6
(France) É Winogradsky (France) C Suire	2	6	1
(Argentina) G Luza (Argentina) P Tarabini	6	6
(Australia) L Warder (Australia) L Field	2	3
(South Africa) S Kruger (South Africa) L Gregory	6^{5}	3
(France) T Champion (France) P Etchemendy	7	6
(Spain) B Uribe (Argentina) B Fulco	5	6	6
3	(Spain) S Casal (United States) B Nagelsen	7	4	8

Third round
6	(Netherlands) T Nijssen (Netherlands) M Bollegraf	6	6
(Argentina) G Luza (Argentina) P Tarabini	3	2
(France) T Champion (France) P Etchemendy	3	6	6
3	(Spain) S Casal (United States) B Nagelsen	6	3	8

Quarterfinals
6	(Netherlands) T Nijssen (Netherlands) M Bollegraf	6	4	6
3	(Spain) S Casal (United States) B Nagelsen	1	6	1

==== Section 4 ====
First round
(France) G Raoux (France) E Derly	6	0	2
(United States) B Dickinson (Poland) I Kuczyńska	1	6	6
(Netherlands) M Koevermans (Netherlands) N Jagerman	6	5	2
(Spain) JC Báguena (Australia) JA Faull	2	7	6
(Uruguay) D Pérez (France) K Quentrec	2	5
(United States) T Pawsat (United States) B Herr	6	7
(Mexico) A Moreno (United States) J Smoller	1	2
(Iran) M Bahrami (United States) E Hakami	6	6
(Czechoslovakia) K Nováček (Czechoslovakia) J Pospíšilová	6	6
(Sweden) M Gustafsson (Belgium) A Devries	1	2
(France) R Gilbert (France) S Niox-Château	2	4
(Peru) P Arraya (Peru) L Gildemeister	6	6

Second round
8	(Australia) D Cahill (Australia) N Provis	7	6
(United States) B Dickinson (Poland) I Kuczyńska	5	4
(Spain) JC Báguena (Australia) JA Faull	3	4
(United States) T Pawsat (United States) B Herr	6	6
(Iran) M Bahrami (United States) E Hakami	6	5	6
(Czechoslovakia) K Nováček (Czechoslovakia) J Pospíšilová	2	7	3
(Peru) P Arraya (Peru) L Gildemeister	5	4
2	(United States) J Grabb (United States) R White	7	6

Third round
8	(Australia) D Cahill (Australia) N Provis	6	3	6
(United States) T Pawsat (United States) B Herr	4	6	1
(Iran) M Bahrami (United States) E Hakami
2	(United States) J Grabb (United States) R White	w/o

Quarterfinals
8	(Australia) D Cahill (Australia) N Provis	6	2	3
2	(United States) J Grabb (United States) R White	1	6	6
