= 1989 French Open – Men's doubles =

Men's doubles
- 1989 French Open

Final
- Champion: (United States) Jim Grabb (United States) Patrick McEnroe
- Runner-up: (Iran) Mansour Bahrami (France) Éric Winogradsky
- Score: 6–4, 2–6, 6–4, 7–6^{(7–5)}

Details
- Draw: 64
- Seeds: 16

Events
Singles	men	women		boys	girls
Doubles	men	women	mixed	boys	girls
WC Singles	men	women	quad
WC Doubles	men	women	quad
Legends	−45	45+	women
← 1988 ·	French Open	· 1990 →

The men's doubles tournament at the 1989 French Open was held from 29 May until 11 June 1989 on the outdoor clay courts at the Stade Roland Garros in Paris, France. Jim Grabb and Patrick McEnroe won the title, defeating Mansour Bahrami and Éric Winogradsky in the final.

== Seeds ==
1. (United States) Rick Leach / (United States) Jim Pugh (first round)
2. (Australia) John Fitzgerald / (Sweden) Anders Järryd (semifinals)
3. (United States) Kevin Curren / (United States) David Pate (first round)
4. (United States) Jim Grabb / (United States) Patrick McEnroe (champions)
5. (Switzerland) Jakob Hlasek / (West Germany) Eric Jelen (third round)
6. (Czechoslovakia) Tomáš Šmíd / (Australia) Mark Woodforde (third round)
7. (Spain) Sergio Casal / (Spain) Javier Sánchez (quarterfinals)
8. (Ecuador) Andrés Gómez / (Socialist Federal Republic of Yugoslavia) Slobodan Živojinović (first round)
9. (Canada) Grant Connell / (Canada) Glenn Michibata (first round)
10. (Australia) Peter Doohan / (Australia) Laurie Warder (second round)
11. (Australia) Darren Cahill / (Australia) Mark Kratzmann (first round)
12. (Czechoslovakia) Petr Korda / (Czechoslovakia) Milan Šrejber (second round)
13. (United States) Jim Courier / (United States) Pete Sampras (second round)
14. (Denmark) Michael Mortensen / (Netherlands) Tom Nijssen (third round)
15. (Mexico) Agustín Moreno / (Peru) Jaime Yzaga (second round)
16. (West Germany) Patrik Kühnen / (West Germany) Carl-Uwe Steeb (first round)

== Draw ==
=== Key ===
- Q = Qualifier
- WC = Wild card
- LL = Lucky loser
- Alt = Alternate
- ITF = ITF entry
- PR = Protected ranking
- SR = Special ranking
- SE = Special exempt
- JE = Junior exempt
- JR = Junior Accelerator Programme entrant
- CO = College Accelerator Programme entrant
- NG = Next Gen Accelerator Program entrant
- w/o = Walkover
- r = Retired
- d = Defaulted

=== Finals ===
Quarterfinals
(Sweden) Ronnie Båthman (Peru) Carlos di Laura	3	6	6
WC	(France) Cédric Pioline (France) Guillaume Raoux	6	4	2
(Iran) Mansour Bahrami (France) Éric Winogradsky	4	6	6
(Brazil) Cássio Motta (United States) Blaine Willenborg	6	1	2
(Spain) Tomás Carbonell (Spain) Carlos Costa	6	3
4	(United States) Jim Grabb (United States) Patrick McEnroe	7	6
7	(Spain) Sergio Casal (Spain) Emilio Sánchez	7	4	4
2	(Australia) John Fitzgerald (Sweden) Anders Järryd	6	6	6

Semifinals
(Sweden) Ronnie Båthman (Peru) Carlos di Laura	2	4	1
(Iran) Mansour Bahrami (France) Éric Winogradsky	6	6	6
4	(United States) Jim Grabb (United States) Patrick McEnroe	7	5	6	6
2	(Australia) John Fitzgerald (Sweden) Anders Järryd	5	7	2	3

Final
(Iran) Mansour Bahrami (France) Éric Winogradsky	2	6	4	6
4	(United States) Jim Grabb (United States) Patrick McEnroe	6	2	6	7

=== Top half ===
==== Section 1 ====
First round
1	(United States) R Leach (United States) J Pugh	2	4
(Austria) A Antonitsch (West Germany) R Osterthun	6	6
(Czechoslovakia) M Mečíř (Czechoslovakia) B Stankovič	7	5	6
(United States) D Rostagno (United States) T Witsken	5	7	4
(Sweden) R Båthman (Peru) C di Laura	6	6
(Sweden) J Svensson (Sweden) LA Wahlgren	2	4
(United States) J Letts (United States) B Man-Son-Hing	1	7	7
15	(Mexico) A Moreno (Peru) J Yzaga	6	5	9
9	(Canada) G Connell (Canada) G Michibata	3	6	5
WC	(France) C Pioline (France) G Raoux	6	3	7
(United States) D Goldie (United States) G Van Emburgh	2	2
(Sweden) T Nydahl (Finland) O Rahnasto	6	6
(Italy) P Canè (Venezuela) N Pereira	6	3
(United Kingdom) N Broad (South Africa) S Kruger	7	6
(Socialist Federal Republic of Yugoslavia) G Ivanišević (Italy) D Nargiso	6	6
8	(Ecuador) A Gómez (Socialist Federal Republic of Yugoslavia) S Živojinović	3	4

Second round
(Austria) A Antonitsch (West Germany) R Osterthun	6	6	5
(Czechoslovakia) M Mečíř (Czechoslovakia) B Stankovič	7	2	7
(Sweden) R Båthman (Peru) C di Laura	6	6
15	(Mexico) A Moreno (Peru) J Yzaga	4	2
WC	(France) C Pioline (France) G Raoux	6	5	7
(Sweden) T Nydahl (Finland) O Rahnasto	1	7	5
(United Kingdom) N Broad (South Africa) S Kruger	3	4
(Socialist Federal Republic of Yugoslavia) G Ivanišević (Italy) D Nargiso	6	6

Third round
(Czechoslovakia) M Mečíř (Czechoslovakia) B Stankovič	3	6
(Sweden) R Båthman (Peru) C di Laura	6	7
WC	(France) C Pioline (France) G Raoux	6	6
(Socialist Federal Republic of Yugoslavia) G Ivanišević (Italy) D Nargiso	3	4

Quarterfinals
(Sweden) R Båthman (Peru) C di Laura	3	6	6
WC	(France) C Pioline (France) G Raoux	6	4	2

==== Section 2 ====
First round
3	(United States) K Curren (United States) D Pate	3	6
(Czechoslovakia) J Čihák (Czechoslovakia) C Suk	6	7
(Iran) M Bahrami (France) É Winogradsky	6	6
(Portugal) J Cunha e Silva (Belgium) E Masso	3	2
(United States) B Pearce (The Bahamas) R Smith	6	6	3
(West Germany) C Saceanu (West Germany) M Stich	7	4	6
(Argentina) H de la Peña (Austria) H Skoff	3	4
13	(United States) J Courier (United States) P Sampras	6	6
11	(Australia) D Cahill (Australia) M Kratzmann	2	6	7
(Spain) JC Báguena (Spain) B Uribe	6	2	9
(Netherlands) M Oosting (Netherlands) J Vekemans	2	6	4
(Brazil) C Motta (United States) B Willenborg	6	3	6
(Italy) U Colombini (Mexico) LE Herrera	6	6
(Spain) J Arrese (Switzerland) C Mezzadri	1	4
(Brazil) D Marcelino (Brazil) M Menezes	1	4
5	(Switzerland) J Hlasek (West Germany) E Jelen	6	6

Second round
(Czechoslovakia) J Čihák (Czechoslovakia) C Suk	1	4
(Iran) M Bahrami (France) É Winogradsky	6	6
(West Germany) C Saceanu (West Germany) M Stich	6	6
13	(United States) J Courier (United States) P Sampras	3	4
(Spain) JC Báguena (Spain) B Uribe	3	3
(Brazil) C Motta (United States) B Willenborg	6	6
(Italy) U Colombini (Mexico) LE Herrera	7	1	3
5	(Switzerland) J Hlasek (West Germany) E Jelen	6	6	6

Third round
(Iran) M Bahrami (France) É Winogradsky	6	6
(West Germany) C Saceanu (West Germany) M Stich	2	3
(Brazil) C Motta (United States) B Willenborg	6	6
5	(Switzerland) J Hlasek (West Germany) E Jelen	4	4

Quarterfinals
(Iran) M Bahrami (France) É Winogradsky	4	6	6
(Brazil) C Motta (United States) B Willenborg	6	1	2

=== Bottom half ===
==== Section 3 ====
First round
6	(Czechoslovakia) T Šmíd (Australia) M Woodforde	6	3	6
(West Germany) T Meinecke (Czechoslovakia) K Nováček	3	6	3
(United Kingdom) J Bates (Sweden) P Lundgren	4	1
(Argentina) G Luza (Argentina) C Miniussi	6	6
(Spain) T Carbonell (Spain) C Costa	6
(Switzerland) H Günthardt (Hungary) B Taróczy	4^{r}
(Peru) P Arraya (Socialist Federal Republic of Yugoslavia) B Orešar	3	4
12	(Czechoslovakia) P Korda (Czechoslovakia) M Šrejber	6	6
14	(Denmark) M Mortensen (Netherlands) T Nijssen	5	7	6
(Sweden) J Gunnarsson (Sweden) M Gustafsson	7	6	2
(United States) M De Palmer (United States) G Donnelly	7	7
(France) JP Fleurian (Nigeria) N Odizor	5	6
(France) L Courteau (France) O Delaître	4	2
(West Germany) U Riglewski (Sweden) T Svantesson	6	6
(Australia) B Dyke (New Zealand) S Guy	2	4
4	(United States) J Grabb (United States) P McEnroe	6	6

Second round
6	(Czechoslovakia) T Šmíd (Australia) M Woodforde	2	7	6
(Argentina) G Luza (Argentina) C Miniussi	6	6	2
(Spain) T Carbonell (Spain) C Costa	6	6
12	(Czechoslovakia) P Korda (Czechoslovakia) M Šrejber	1	3
14	(Denmark) M Mortensen (Netherlands) T Nijssen	6	6
(United States) M De Palmer (United States) G Donnelly	1	4
(West Germany) U Riglewski (Sweden) T Svantesson	1	7	3
4	(United States) J Grabb (United States) P McEnroe	6	6	6

Third round
6	(Czechoslovakia) T Šmíd (Australia) M Woodforde	6	4	4
(Spain) T Carbonell (Spain) C Costa	2	6	6
14	(Denmark) M Mortensen (Netherlands) T Nijssen	6	3
4	(United States) J Grabb (United States) P McEnroe	7	6

Quarterfinals
(Spain) T Carbonell (Spain) C Costa	6	3
4	(United States) J Grabb (United States) P McEnroe	7	6

==== Section 4 ====
First round
7	(Spain) S Casal (Spain) J Sánchez	7	6
(Czechoslovakia) J Navrátil (Czechoslovakia) R Vogel	5	3
(France) A Boetsch (France) T Champion	4	6	8
(Brazil) R Acioly (Brazil) D Campos	6	1	6
(Uruguay) M Filippini (Uruguay) D Pérez	7	3	9
WC	(France) J Potier (France) T Tulasne	5	6	11
(United States) B Dickinson (Netherlands) P Haarhuis	4	6
10	(Australia) P Doohan (Australia) L Warder	6	7
16	(West Germany) P Kühnen (West Germany) CU Steeb	6	4
(United States) M Davis (United States) T Pawsat	7	6
(Netherlands) M Koevermans (Netherlands) M Schapers	6	4	9
(Mexico) L Lavalle (Brazil) L Mattar	4	6	7
(West Germany) P Baur (West Germany) A Mronz	6	3	6
(Sweden) R Bergh (United States) P Palandjian	4	6	1
WC	(United States) J Connors (United States) V Gerulaitis	2	5
4	(Australia) J Fitzgerald (Sweden) A Järryd	6	7

Second round
7	(Spain) S Casal (Spain) J Sánchez	6	6
(France) A Boetsch (France) T Champion	3	1
WC	(France) J Potier (France) T Tulasne	4	6	6
10	(Australia) P Doohan (Australia) L Warder	6	4	2
(United States) M Davis (United States) T Pawsat	7	2	6
(Netherlands) M Koevermans (Netherlands) M Schapers	6	6	3
(West Germany) P Baur (West Germany) A Mronz	3	1
2	(Australia) J Fitzgerald (Sweden) A Järryd	6	6

Third round
7	(Spain) S Casal (Spain) J Sánchez	6	5	7
WC	(France) J Potier (France) T Tulasne	4	7	9
(United States) M Davis (United States) T Pawsat	6	6	6
2	(Australia) J Fitzgerald (Sweden) A Järryd	7	4	4

Quarterfinals
7	(Spain) S Casal (Spain) J Sánchez	6	6	6
2	(Australia) J Fitzgerald (Sweden) A Järryd	7	4	4
