= Porto Challenger =

Defunct tennis tournament
- Location: Porto, Portugal
- Category: ATP Challenger (1982–1998)
- Surface: Clay

The Porto Challenger was a professional tennis tournament in Portugal played on clay courts that was part of the ATP Challenger Series. Held in Porto, the first edition of the tournament was in 1982, then it was contested every year from 1987 to 1994, biannually in 1991, 1992 and 1993. It continued as a semi regular event until 1998.

== Past finals ==
=== Singles ===
Year	Champion	Runner-up	Score
1982	(Colombia) Jairo Velasco Sr.	(Spain) Juan Avendaño	6–7, 6–3, 6–3
1983-1986	Not contested		
1987	(Sweden) Christian Bergström	(Austria) Alex Antonitsch	6–1, 6–3
1988	(Netherlands) Paul Dogger	(Netherlands) Michiel Schapers	6–2, 3–6, 6–3
1989	(Soviet Union) Andrei Cherkasov	(Spain) Javier Sánchez	7–6, 7–5
1990	(Netherlands) Mark Koevermans	(Argentina) Franco Davín	6–3, 6–3
1991	(Italy) Stefano Pescosolido	(Argentina) Roberto Azar	6–1, 6–1
1991 (2)	(Belgium) Bart Wuyts	(Canada) Martin Wostenholme	6–3, 7–5
1992	(Spain) José Francisco Altur	(Switzerland) Claudio Mezzadri	1–6, 7–6, 7–5
1992 (2)	(Spain) Jordi Arrese	(Sweden) Lars Jönsson	2–6, 6–1, 6–0
1993	(Morocco) Younes El Aynaoui	(Spain) Jordi Arrese	7–5, 0–6, 6–4
1993 (2)	(Argentina) Franco Davín	(Argentina) Gabriel Markus	6–4, 6–3
1994	(Austria) Gilbert Schaller	(Uruguay) Marcelo Filippini	6–2, 7–5
1995	Not contested		
1996	(Australia) Richard Fromberg	(Spain) Galo Blanco	6–3, 7–6
1997	Not contested		
1998	(Morocco) Younes El Aynaoui	(Austria) Stefan Koubek	4–6, 6–2, 6–4

=== Doubles ===
Year	Champions	Runners-up	Score
1982	(Belgium) Libor Pimek (Belgium) Thierry Stevaux	(United States) Andy Kohlberg (South Africa) Robbie Venter	4–6, 7–6, 7–5
1983-1986	Not contested		
1987	(Sweden) Conny Falk (Sweden) Stefan Svensson	(Sweden) Ronnie Båthman (Denmark) Michael Tauson	7–5, 5–7, 6–3
1988	(Netherlands) Michiel Schapers (Netherlands) Huub van Boeckel	(Soviet Union) Andrei Olhovskiy (Soviet Union) Alexander Zverev	6–3, 3–6, 7–6
1989	(Spain) Tomás Carbonell (Spain) Carlos Costa	(Netherlands) Paul Haarhuis (Belgium) Denis Langaskens	6–4, 6–3
1990	(Argentina) Eduardo Bengoechea (Argentina) Christian Miniussi	(Spain) Jose Clavet (Spain) Francisco Roig	6–0, 6–3
1991	(Ukraine) Dimitri Poliakov (Czechoslovakia) Tomáš Anzari	(Netherlands) Paul Haarhuis (Netherlands) Mark Koevermans	3–6, 6–3, 6–4
1991 (2)	(Czechoslovakia) Josef Čihák (Czechoslovakia) Tomáš Anzari	(Spain) Juan Carlos Báguena (Ecuador) Andrés Gómez	7–5, 6–2
1992	(Australia) Carl Limberger (Czechoslovakia) Tomáš Anzari	(United States) Brian Devening (Norway) Bent-Ove Pedersen	3–6, 6–1, 6–4
1992 (2)	(United States) Doug Eisenman (Norway) Bent-Ove Pedersen	(Spain) Jordi Arrese (Spain) Àlex Corretja	1–6, 6–4, 6–2
1993	(Netherlands) Menno Oosting (Czech Republic) Daniel Vacek	(Spain) Jordi Burillo (Spain) Javier Sánchez	6–3, 7–6
1993 (2)	(South Africa) Johan de Beer (South Africa) Brent Haygarth	(Italy) Cristian Brandi (Italy) Federico Mordegan	6–2, 2–6, 7–6
1994	(Argentina) Luis Lobo (Spain) Javier Sánchez	(Mexico) Jorge Lozano (Argentina) Roberto Saad	7–6, 6–3
1995	Not contested		
1996	(Portugal) Emanuel Couto (Portugal) Nuno Marques	(Portugal) Bernardo Mota (Venezuela) Jimy Szymanski	6–7, 6–3, 7–5
1997	Not contested		
1998	(Spain) Juan Ignacio Carrasco (Spain) Jairo Velasco Jr.	(Italy) Cristian Brandi (Netherlands) Stephen Noteboom	7–5, 6–4
