= Toshihisa Tsuchihashi =

Japanese tennis player (born 1966)

Toshihisa Tsuchihashi (土橋 登志久, Tsuchihashi Toshihisa; born October 18, 1966 in Kagoshima) is a former tennis player from Japan. In May 1988, Tsuchihashi achieved a career-high singles ranking of World No. 359. He proceeded to represent his native country at the 1988 Summer Olympics in Seoul, where he was defeated by Mexico's Agustín Moreno in the first round. In October 1989, he became a quarterfinals of the 1989 ATP Challenger Series.
