= José Clavet =

Spanish tennis player (born 1965)

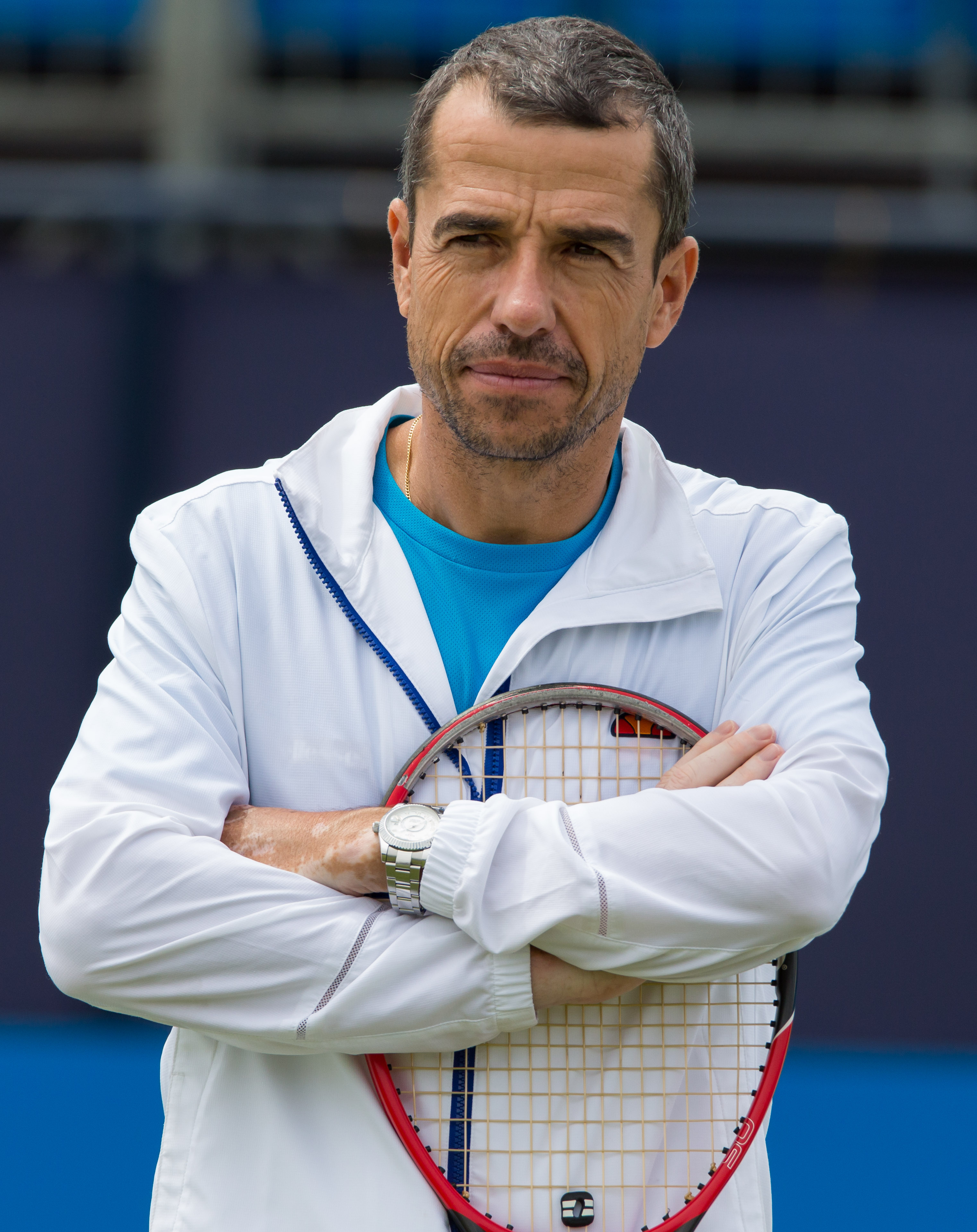
- Full name: José Manuel Clavet González de Castejón
- Country (sports): Spain
- Residence: Madrid, Spain
- Born: September 11, 1965 (age 60) Madrid, Spain
- Height: 1.80 m (5 ft 11 in)
- Plays: Right-handed
- Prize money: US$103,507

Singles
- Career record: 6–11
- Career titles: 0; 1 Challenger, 0 Futures
- Highest ranking: No. 178 (15 September 1986)

Grand Slam singles results
- French Open: 3R (1986)
- Wimbledon: Q2 (1985)

Doubles
- Career record: 13–28
- Career titles: 0; 2 Challenger, 0 Futures
- Highest ranking: No. 119 (23 June 1986)

Grand Slam doubles results
- French Open: 2R (1986)

Coaching career (1991–present)
- Tommy Robredo Spain; Àlex Corretja Spain; Fernando Verdasco Spain; Feliciano López Spain; Karen Khachanov Russia
- Last updated on: 28 December 2021.

José Manuel "Pepo" Clavet González de Castejón (Spanish pronunciation: [xosemaˈnwel ˈpepo klaˈβet ɣonˈθaleθ ðe kasteˈxon]; (Note: In isolation, José and Manuel are pronounced [xoˈse] and [maˈnwel] respectively.) born 11 September 1965 in Madrid) is a former tennis player from Spain.

He only played seventeen ATP matches during his professional career, but after retiring from professional tennis, he became a tennis coach. He has previously coached his brother Francisco and fellow countrymen Àlex Corretja, Fernando Verdasco, Tommy Robredo, Feliciano López and Karen Khachanov. He is currently the coach of Spanish player Alejandro Davidovich Fokina.

== ATP Challenger and ITF Futures finals ==
=== Singles: 1 (1–0) ===
Legend ATP Challenger (1–0) ITF Futures (0–0)	Finals by surface Hard (0–0) Clay (1–0) Grass (0–0) Carpet (0–0)

Result	W–L	Date	Tournament	Tier	Surface	Opponent	Score
Win	1–0	Sep 1989	Verona, Italy	Challenger	Clay	(Spain) Jose-Luis Aparisi	7–6, 7–6

=== Doubles: 4 (2–2) ===
Legend ATP Challenger (2–2) ITF Futures (0–0)	Finals by surface Hard (0–1) Clay (2–1) Grass (0–0) Carpet (0–0)

Result	W–L	Date	Tournament	Tier	Surface	Partner	Opponents	Score
Win	1–0	Sep 1989	Verona, Italy	Challenger	Clay	(Spain) Francisco Clavet	(Italy) Corrado Aprili (New Zealand) Bruce Derlin	7–5, 6–4
Loss	1–1	Apr 1990	Oporto, Portugal	Challenger	Clay	(Spain) Francisco Roig	(Argentina) Eduardo Bengoechea (Argentina) Christian Miniussi	0–6, 3–6
Win	2–1	Aug 1990	Lins, Brazil	Challenger	Clay	(Spain) Jose-Luis Aparisi	(Mexico) Agustín Moreno (Argentina) Javier Frana	7–6, 6–3
Loss	2–2	Aug 1991	Segovia, Italy	Challenger	Hard	(Spain) Juan-Carlos Baguena	(Spain) Francisco Clavet (Spain) Javier Sánchez	6–7, 2–6
