= Paul Dogger =

Dutch tennis player

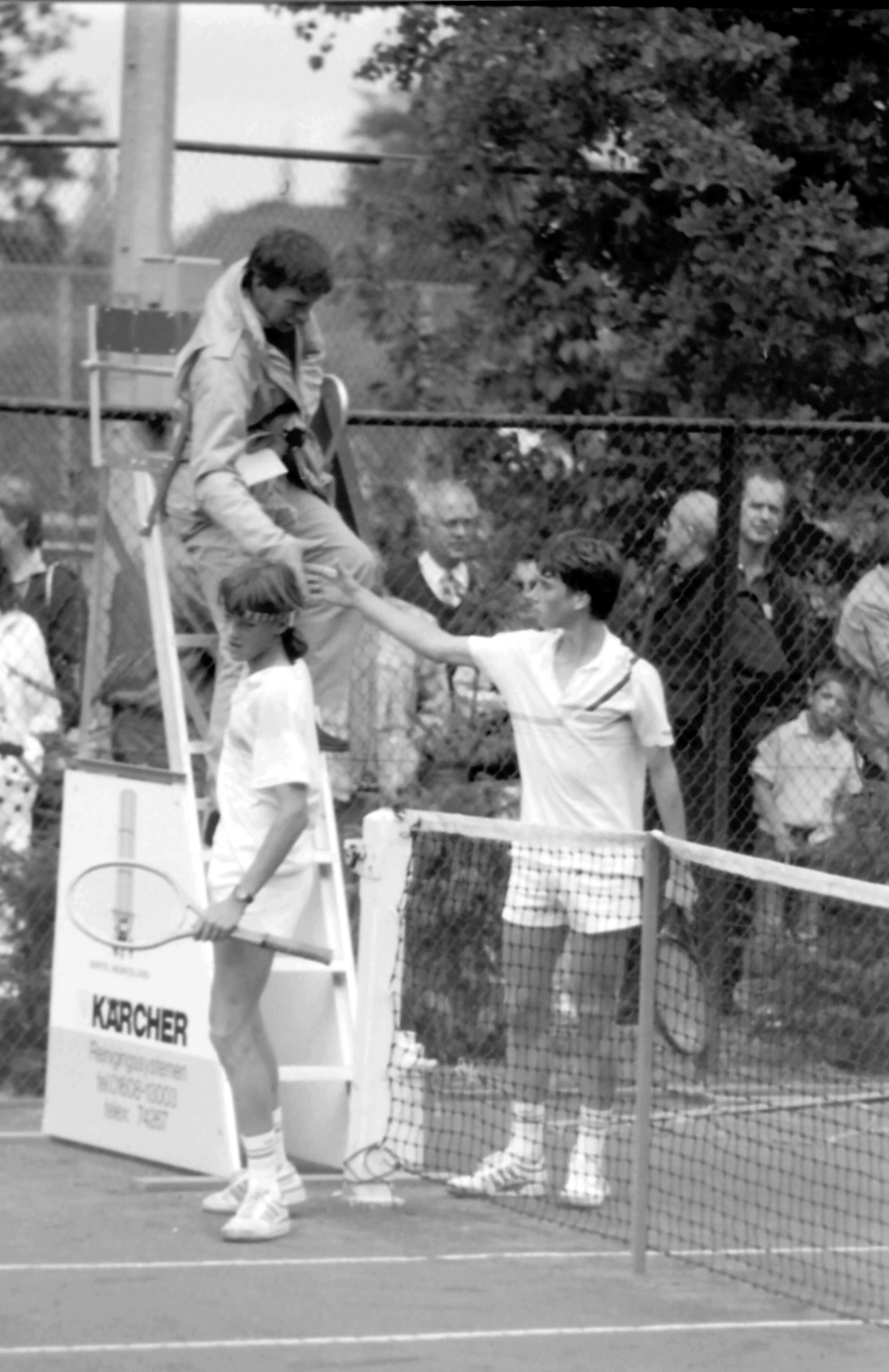
- Dogger (left) as a junior in 1986, playing Krajicek
- Full name: Paul Dogger
- Country (sports): Netherlands
- Born: 4 July 1971 (age 53); Amsterdam, Netherlands
- Prize money: $28,240

Singles
- Career record: 1–6
- Career titles: 0
- Highest ranking: No. 191 (1 August 1988)

Doubles
- Highest ranking: No. 493 (17 October 1988)

Paul Dogger (born 4 July 1971) is a former professional tennis player from the Netherlands.

== Biography ==
=== Career ===
Dogger, who was born in Amsterdam, was a highly ranked junior, the national champion in multiple age levels growing up. He often outperformed close friend Richard Krajicek, who went on to win Wimbledon. Most notably, Dogger beat Brice Karsh to win the Under 16s title at the Orange Bowl in 1987. At the age of 16 he played in an exhibition tournament in Ede which included a match against Ivan Lendl where he was competitive in a 4–6, 4–6 loss. Only days after turning 17 in 1988, he became one of the youngest players to win a Challenger tournament when he claimed the title at Oporto. In the same month he represented the Netherlands in a 1988 Davis Cup tie against the USSR in the Latvian resort town of Jūrmala. Featuring in two singles rubbers, he lost both to his Soviet opponents, Andrei Cherkasov and Andrei Chesnokov, as the Netherlands were whitewashed in the tie. He was a boys' singles quarter-finalist at the 1988 French Open and bettered that performance at the 1989 French Open by making the semi-finals.

Unable to replicate his junior success on the professional tour, he peaked at 191 in the world while still only 17 and his best result on the Grand Prix/ATP Tour was a second round appearance at the 1988 Dutch Open. He struggled with injuries and illness, including hernia problems and pneumonia, before retiring at the age of 22 in 1993.

=== Personal life ===
Dogger has battled with alcohol and cocaine addition. His father Fred, a former top three player in the Netherlands, suffered from multiple sclerosis and in 1996 chose euthanasia to end his life. This experience was one of the catalysts for Dogger to undergo rehabilitation after emigrating to the United States in 1999. He married an American and has since returned to the Netherlands where he works as a tennis coach.

== Challenger titles ==
=== Singles: (1) ===
No.	Year	Tournament	Surface	Opponent	Score
1.	1988	Porto, Portugal	Clay	(Netherlands) Michiel Schapers	6–2, 3–6, 6–3

== See also ==
- List of Netherlands Davis Cup team representatives
