= Ned Caswell =

American tennis player (born 1963)

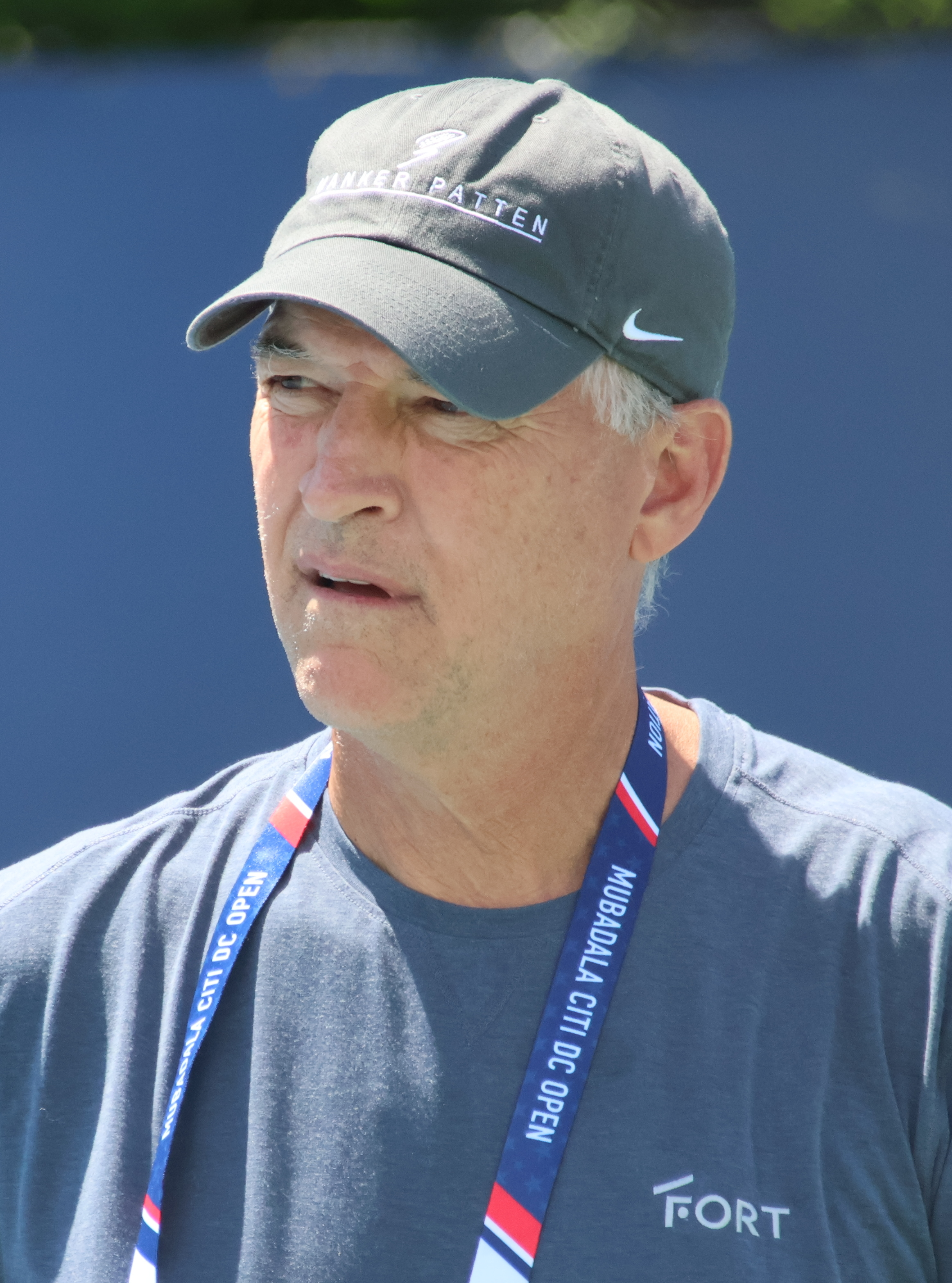
- Caswell in 2025
- Country (sports): United States
- Born: December 28, 1963 (age 62) Atlanta, Georgia, U.S.
- Height: 6 ft 3 in (191 cm)
- Plays: Right-handed
- Prize money: $24,660

Singles
- Career record: 2–5
- Highest ranking: No. 213 (May 22, 1989)

Doubles
- Career record: 0–5

Grand Slam doubles results
- US Open: 1R (1987)

Ned Caswell (born December 28, 1963) is an American former professional tennis player.

Born in Atlanta, Caswell was a two-time All-American tennis player for Furman University, having arrived there on a basketball scholarship. Competing in both sports, he was the basketball team's assist leader from 1985 to 1986. As a tennis player in 1987 he reached the NCAA singles quarter-finals and was named the Southern Conference MVP.

Caswell featured on the professional tennis tour in the late 1980s and had a career best world ranking of 213. He appeared in the men's doubles main draw of the 1987 US Open, partnering Luke Jensen. At the 1989 Canadian Open, following a win over Daniel Nestor, Caswell was beaten in the second round by John McEnroe, but was able to win a set against the world number five who lost his temper often during the match.

== ATP Challenger titles ==
=== Doubles: (1) ===
No.	Date	Tournament	Surface	Partner	Opponents	Score
1.	Feb 1989	Nairobi, Kenya	Clay	(United States) Chris Garner	(Italy) Fabio Di Mauro (Italy) Mario Visconti	6–3, 7–6
