= Dirk Leppen =

German tennis player

- Country (sports): West Germany; Germany
- Born: 23 August 1966 (age 58); Vreden, West Germany
- Height: 5 ft 11 in (180 cm)
- Plays: Right-handed
- Prize money: $16,823

Singles
- Career record: 0–3
- Highest ranking: No. 174 (26 June 1989)

Grand Slam singles results
- Wimbledon: Q1 (1990)

Doubles
- Career record: 1–1
- Highest ranking: No. 362 (16 April 1990)

Dirk Leppen (born 23 August 1966) is a German former professional tennis player.

Leppen, a native of Vreden, reached a career high singles ranking of 174 in the world and 12th nationally. He featured in the qualifying draw for the 1990 Wimbledon Championships. His ATP Tour main draw appearances include 1990 Italian Open (Rome Masters), where he was beaten in the first round by sixth seed Martín Jaite.

== ATP Challenger finals ==
=== Doubles: 1 (0–1) ===
Result	Date	Tournament	Surface	Partner	Opponents	Score
Loss	June 1989	Montabaur, West Germany	Clay	(West Germany) Karsten Braasch	(United Kingdom) Nick Fulwood (West Germany) Harald Rittersbacher	5–7, 3–6
