= Harald Rittersbacher =

German tennis player

- Full name: Harald Rittersbacher
- Country (sports): West Germany
- Born: 27 April 1963 (age 61); Ludwigshafen, West Germany
- Height: 6 ft 2 in (188 cm)
- Plays: Right-handed
- Prize money: $37,551

Singles
- Career record: 2-6
- Highest ranking: No. 257 (14 July 1986)

Doubles
- Career record: 4-22
- Highest ranking: No. 183 (14 July 1986)

Grand Slam doubles results
- French Open: 1R (1986)
- Wimbledon: 1R (1987)

Grand Slam mixed doubles results
- French Open: 1R (1988)

Harald Rittersbacher (born 27 April 1963) is a former professional tennis player from Germany.

== Biography ==
Born in Ludwigshafen, Rittersbacher played collegiate tennis in the United States for Texas Christian University in the early 1980s.

Rittersbacher, a right-handed player, made his grand slam main draw debut at the 1986 French Open in the men's doubles with Anthony Emerson. At the 1987 Wimbledon Championships he and partner Russell Barlow faced top seeds Guy Forget and Yannick Noah for a first round loss. He made his third and final grand slam appearance in the mixed doubles with Marise Kruger at the 1988 French Open.

On the Grand Prix circuit he made most of his appearances in doubles, making several quarter-finals.

He won his only Challenger title in 1989, which came in the doubles at Montabaur in his home country.

Now a tennis coach, Rittersbacher was formerly based in Mannheim, the birthplace of Steffi Graf, who had him as a hitting partner for several years. He was later an assistant coach for the tennis team at Hawaii Pacific University.

== Challenger titles ==
=== Doubles: (1) ===
No.	Year	Tournament	Surface	Partner	Opponents	Score
1.	1989	Montabaur, West Germany	Clay	(United Kingdom) Nick Fulwood	(West Germany) Karsten Braasch (West Germany) Dirk Leppen	7–5, 6–3
