= Fabio Di Mauro =

Italian tennis player

- Country (sports): Italy
- Plays: Right-handed
- Prize money: $12,737

Singles
- Career record: 0–3
- Highest ranking: No. 302 (31 Jul 1989)

Doubles
- Career record: 0–2
- Highest ranking: No. 498 (15 Jan 1990)

Fabio Di Mauro is an Italian former professional tennis player.

Di Mauro, a Sicilian player from Catania, competed on the professional tour in the 1980s. He reached a best singles world ranking of 302 and made two main draw appearances at the Campionati Internazionali di Sicilia. In 1988 he had a win over Alberto Mancini at an ATP Challenger tournament in San Marino.

== ATP Challenger finals ==
=== Doubles: 1 (0–1) ===
Result	Date	Tournament	Surface	Partner	Opponents	Score
Loss	Feb 1989	Nairobi, Kenya	Clay	(Italy) Mario Visconti	(United States) Ned Caswell (United States) Chris Garner	3–6, 6–7
