= Olivier Soules =

French tennis player

- Country (sports): France
- Residence: Bruay-la-Buissière
- Born: 24 March 1967 (age 59) Douai, France
- Height: 1.88 m (6 ft 2 in)
- Turned pro: 1989
- Plays: Right-handed
- Prize money: $106,777

Singles
- Career record: 0–8
- Career titles: 0
- Highest ranking: No. 143 (6 July 1992)

Grand Slam singles results
- French Open: 1R (1990, 1991, 1992)

Doubles
- Career record: 0–1
- Career titles: 0
- Highest ranking: No. 323 (17 July 1995)

Olivier Soules (born 24 March 1967) is a former professional tennis player from France.

Soules was runner-up in the 1989 French National Championships.

As a wildcard, Soules appeared in three French Opens during his career. The Frenchman was eliminated in the opening round of each occasion. In 1990 he played world number 21 Guillermo Pérez Roldán and took the first set in a tiebreak, but lost the match in four. The following year he was defeated by Jason Stoltenberg. He was matched up against second seed Stefan Edberg in 1992 and competed well, taking the third set and winning five games in the fourth set.

He has coached Cypriot Marcos Baghdatis
