= Fabián Blengino =

Former Argentine tennis coach

- Country (sports): Argentina
- Born: Buenos Aires, Argentina
- Prize money: $10,745

Singles
- Highest ranking: No. 370 (9 Oct 1989)

Doubles
- Career record: 0–1
- Highest ranking: No. 275 (15 May 1989)

Fabián Blengino is an Argentine tennis coach and former professional player.

Blengino had a career best singles ranking of 370 in his playing career and won an ATP Challenger title in doubles.

Since 1995 he has been a tennis coach and runs the Blengino Academy in his native Buenos Aires. He has coached numerous players on the ATP Tour including Guillermo Coria, who he helped reach the 2004 French Open final.

== ATP Challenger titles ==
=== Doubles: (1) ===
No.	Date	Tournament	Surface	Partner	Opponents	Score
1.	Dec 1989	Bogotá, Colombia	Clay	(Argentina) Gustavo Giussani	(Argentina) Guillermo Minutella (Argentina) Gerardo Mirad	6–4, 1–6, 7–6
