= Borja Uribe =

Spanish tennis player (born 1964)

- Full name: Borja Uribe-Quintana
- Country (sports): Spain
- Born: 24 June 1964 (age 60); Valencia, Spain
- Height: 185 cm (6 ft 1 in)
- Plays: Right-handed
- Prize money: $31,931

Singles
- Highest ranking: No. 226 (11 December 1989)

Doubles
- Career record: 7–13
- Highest ranking: No. 92 (19 June 1989)

Grand Slam doubles results
- French Open: 2R (1989)
- Wimbledon: 1R (1989)

Borja Uribe-Quintana (Spanish pronunciation: [ˈboɾxawˈɾiβe]; born 24 June 1964) is a former professional tennis player from Spain.

== Biography ==
Born in Valencia, Uribe attended Louisiana State University and played American collegiate tennis for four years, where he was known by the name "Billy".

During his time competing on the professional circuit, which began in 1988, he was most successful as a doubles player. He reached a top doubles ranking of 92 in the world and won two Challenger titles. His best performance on the Grand Prix circuit was a semi-final appearance at Florence in 1989, partnering Mihnea-Ion Năstase, the nephew of Ilie.

All of his grand slam main draw appearances came in 1989. At the 1989 French Open he and partner Juan Carlos Báguena made the second round of the men's doubles, by beating 11th seeds Darren Cahill and Mark Kratzmann. He also competed in the mixed doubles with Bettina Fulco, then in the men's doubles at the 1989 Wimbledon Championships, partnering Luis Herrera.

Since 1995 he has worked as a tennis coach. He was the childhood coach of Daniel Gimeno Traver and remained with the Spaniard until 2010. In 2015 he began coaching Venezuelan Davis Cup player Ricardo Rodríguez.

== Challenger titles ==
=== Doubles: (2) ===
No.	Year	Tournament	Surface	Partner	Opponents	Score
1.	1988	Strasbourg, France	Clay	(Spain) Juan Carlos Báguena	(West Germany) Pavel Vojtíšek (West Germany) Ivo Werner	6–4, 6–3
2.	1989	Vilamoura, Portugal	Hard	(Spain) Marcos Górriz	(Italy) Simone Colombo (United Kingdom) David Felgate	6–1, 3–6, 7–6
