= Juan Carlos Báguena =

Spanish tennis player and coach

- Country (sports): (Spain)
- Born: 7 January 1967 (age 58); Barcelona, Spain
- Height: 1.83 m (6 ft 0 in)
- Plays: Right-handed
- Prize money: $168,464

Singles
- Career record: 3–18
- Career titles: 0
- Highest ranking: No. 206 (15 Jan 1990)

Grand Slam singles results
- French Open: 1R (1991)

Doubles
- Career record: 27–53
- Career titles: 1
- Highest ranking: No. 107 (9 Sep 1991)

Grand Slam doubles results
- French Open: 2R (1989)

Juan Carlos Báguena (Spanish pronunciation: [xwaŋ ˈkaɾlos ˈβaɣena]; (Note: In isolation, Juan and Báguena are pronounced [xwan] and [ˈbaɣena] respectively.) born 7 January 1967) is a tennis coach and former professional tennis player from Spain.

== Career ==
Báguena was primarily a doubles player and reached the semi-finals at Bari in 1988.

He made the second round of the men's doubles in the 1989 French Open, partnering Borja Uribe. The pair beat Australians Darren Cahill and Mark Kratzmann in what was a close opening round encounter, won 9–7 in the third and final set. In the mixed doubles he played with Jo-Anne Faull and also reached the second round.

In 1990, Baguena teamed up with Omar Camporese to win the Madrid Trophy. At the same event he also reached the singles quarter-finalist. He also reached the doubles semi-finals in Genova that year.

The Spaniard made his only Grand Slam singles appearance at the 1991 French Open and lost a five set opening match to Christian Miniussi. His best performance of the year came in Florence, where he and Carlos Costa were doubles runners-up.

== ATP career finals ==
=== Doubles: 2 (1–1) ===
Result	W-L	Date	Tournament	Surface	Partner	Opponents	Score
Win	1–0	1990	Madrid, Spain	Clay	(Italy) Omar Camporese	(Ecuador) Andrés Gómez (Spain) Javier Sánchez	6–4, 3–6, 6–3
Loss	1–1	1991	Florence, Italy	Clay	(Spain) Carlos Costa	(Sweden) Ola Jonsson (Sweden) Magnus Larsson	6–3, 1–6, 1–6

== Challenger titles ==
=== Doubles: (2) ===
No.	Year	Tournament	Surface	Partner	Opponents	Score
1.	1988	Strasbourg, France	Clay	(Spain) Borja Uribe	(West Germany) Pavel Vojtíšek (West Germany) Ivo Werner	6–4, 6–3
2.	1990	Casablanca, Morocco	Clay	(Spain) Francisco Roig	(Czechoslovakia) Slava Doseděl (Netherlands) Richard Krajicek	7–5, 5–7, 6–4
