= 1987 ATP Challenger Series =

Details
- Duration: 20 January 1987 – 27 December 1987
- Edition: 10th
- Tournaments: 61

Achievements (singles)

The ATP Challenger Series is the second-tier tour for professional tennis organised by the Association of Tennis Professionals (ATP). The 1987 ATP Challenger Series calendar comprises 61 tournaments, with prize money ranging from $25,000 up to $75,000.

== Schedule ==
=== January ===
Week of	Tournament	Champions	Runners-up	Semifinalists	Quarterfinalists
January 5	No tournaments scheduled.				
January 12	No tournaments scheduled.				
January 20	Viña del Mar Challenger; Viña del Mar, Chile $25,000 – clay – 32S/16D; Singles draw – Doubles draw	(West Germany) Peter Moraing; 4–6, 6–1, 6–4	(Argentina) Roberto Azar	(Peru) Pablo Arraya (Argentina) Alejandro Ganzábal	(Chile) Ricardo Acuña (United States) Jimmy Brown (Argentina) Gustavo Garetto (Paraguay) Hugo Chapacú
January 20	Viña del Mar Challenger; Viña del Mar, Chile $25,000 – clay – 32S/16D; Singles draw – Doubles draw	(Paraguay) Francisco González (Paraguay) Víctor Pecci; 3–6, 6–3, 6–1	(Spain) José López-Maeso (Spain) Alberto Tous	(Peru) Pablo Arraya (Argentina) Alejandro Ganzábal	(Chile) Ricardo Acuña (United States) Jimmy Brown (Argentina) Gustavo Garetto (Paraguay) Hugo Chapacú
January 26	No tournaments scheduled.				

=== February ===
Week of	Tournament	Champions	Runners-up	Semifinalists	Quarterfinalists
February 2	Enugu Challenger; Enugu, Nigeria $25,000 – hard – 32S/16D; Singles draw – Doubles draw	(United States) Brett Dickinson; 2–6, 6–2, 6–4	(Czechoslovakia) Stanislav Birner	(United States) Rill Baxter (United States) Michael Kures	(Mexico) Jorge Lozano (United States) Craig Kardon (West Germany) Christian Weis (France) Éric Winogradsky
February 2	Enugu Challenger; Enugu, Nigeria $25,000 – hard – 32S/16D; Singles draw – Doubles draw	(Mexico) Jorge Lozano (United States) Tim Pawsat; 6–1, 1–6, 6–2	(United Kingdom) Jeremy Bates (Czechoslovakia) Stanislav Birner	(United States) Rill Baxter (United States) Michael Kures	(Mexico) Jorge Lozano (United States) Craig Kardon (West Germany) Christian Weis (France) Éric Winogradsky
February 2	Nairobi Challenger; Nairobi, Kenya $25,000 – clay – 32S/16D; Singles draw – Doubles draw	(Italy) Luca Bottazzi; 6–2, 7–6	(Kenya) Paul Wekesa	(Italy) Walter Bertini (Italy) Marco Armellini	(United States) Chris Kennedy (Finland) Veli Paloheimo (West Germany) Heiner Moraing (Italy) Omar Urbinati
February 2	Nairobi Challenger; Nairobi, Kenya $25,000 – clay – 32S/16D; Singles draw – Doubles draw	(India) Anand Amritraj (India) Srinivasan Vasudevan; 6–3, 6–4	(Italy) Antonio Altobelli (Italy) Giovanni Lelli Mami	(Italy) Walter Bertini (Italy) Marco Armellini	(United States) Chris Kennedy (Finland) Veli Paloheimo (West Germany) Heiner Moraing (Italy) Omar Urbinati
February 2	São Paulo-1 Challenger; São Paulo, Brazil $25,000 – clay – 32S/16D; Singles draw – Doubles draw	(West Germany) Pavel Vojtíšek; 6–4, 2–6, 6–3	(Argentina) Roberto Argüello	(Brazil) César Kist (United States) Lawson Duncan	(United States) Jimmy Brown (United States) Ricky Brown (Argentina) Alejandro Ganzábal (Brazil) Nelson Aerts
February 2	São Paulo-1 Challenger; São Paulo, Brazil $25,000 – clay – 32S/16D; Singles draw – Doubles draw	(Sweden) Ronnie Båthman (Peru) Carlos di Laura; 6–4, 6–4	(Brazil) César Kist (Brazil) João Soares	(Brazil) César Kist (United States) Lawson Duncan	(United States) Jimmy Brown (United States) Ricky Brown (Argentina) Alejandro Ganzábal (Brazil) Nelson Aerts
February 9	No tournaments scheduled.				
February 16	Lagos Open; Lagos, Nigeria $75,000 – hard – 32S/16D; Singles draw – Doubles draw	(Mexico) Jorge Lozano; 6–4, 6–4	(Nigeria) Nduka Odizor	(Austria) Alex Antonitsch (Nigeria) Tony Mmoh	(Australia) Peter Carter (Nigeria) Godwin Emeh (France) Loïc Courteau (United States) Michael Kures
February 16	Lagos Open; Lagos, Nigeria $75,000 – hard – 32S/16D; Singles draw – Doubles draw	(United States) Lloyd Bourne (United States) Jeff Klaparda; 6–7, 6–2, 7–6	(France) Loïc Courteau (France) Éric Winogradsky	(Austria) Alex Antonitsch (Nigeria) Tony Mmoh	(Australia) Peter Carter (Nigeria) Godwin Emeh (France) Loïc Courteau (United States) Michael Kures
February 23	No tournaments scheduled.				

=== March ===
Week of	Tournament	Champions	Runners-up	Semifinalists	Quarterfinalists
March 2	No tournaments scheduled.				
March 9	Challenger La Manche; Cherbourg, France $25,000 – hard (1) – 32S/16D; Singles draw – Doubles draw	(Sweden) Stefan Eriksson; 6–3, 6–0	(United States) Jim Pugh	(United States) Jonathan Canter (South Africa) Denys Maasdorp	(Australia) Darren Cahill (France) Éric Winogradsky (Australia) Mark Woodforde (United States) Bud Cox
March 9	Challenger La Manche; Cherbourg, France $25,000 – hard (1) – 32S/16D; Singles draw – Doubles draw	(United States) Paul Chamberlin (United States) Leif Shiras; 7–5, 7–5	(United States) Jim Pugh (France) Éric Winogradsky	(United States) Jonathan Canter (South Africa) Denys Maasdorp	(Australia) Darren Cahill (France) Éric Winogradsky (Australia) Mark Woodforde (United States) Bud Cox
March 16	Palm Hills International Tennis Challenger; Cairo, Egypt $75,000 – clay – 32S/16D; Singles draw – Doubles draw	(Spain) Alberto Tous; 6–2, 6–3	(Spain) David de Miguel	(Italy) Claudio Pistolesi (West Germany) Tore Meinecke	(Spain) Juan Aguilera (West Germany) Pavel Vojtíšek (West Germany) Carl-Uwe Steeb (West Germany) Wolfgang Popp
March 16	Palm Hills International Tennis Challenger; Cairo, Egypt $75,000 – clay – 32S/16D; Singles draw – Doubles draw	(France) Loïc Courteau (West Germany) Tore Meinecke; 2–6, 7–6, 6–4	(Spain) Jordi Arrese (Spain) David de Miguel	(Italy) Claudio Pistolesi (West Germany) Tore Meinecke	(Spain) Juan Aguilera (West Germany) Pavel Vojtíšek (West Germany) Carl-Uwe Steeb (West Germany) Wolfgang Popp
March 23	Marrakech Challenger; Marrakesh, Morocco $50,000 – clay – 32S/16D; Singles draw – Doubles draw	(France) Tarik Benhabiles; 6–2, 7–5	(Argentina) Francisco Yunis	(United States) Jim Pugh (West Germany) Carl-Uwe Steeb	(Spain) David de Miguel (Spain) Juan Avendaño (Peru) Carlos di Laura (West Germany) Tore Meinecke
March 23	Marrakech Challenger; Marrakesh, Morocco $50,000 – clay – 32S/16D; Singles draw – Doubles draw	(France) Tarik Benhabiles (Peru) Carlos di Laura; 4–6, 6–3, 6–4	(United States) Jim Pugh (Sweden) Magnus Tideman	(United States) Jim Pugh (West Germany) Carl-Uwe Steeb	(Spain) David de Miguel (Spain) Juan Avendaño (Peru) Carlos di Laura (West Germany) Tore Meinecke
March 30	Agadir Challenger; Agadir, Morocco $50,000 – clay – 32S/16D; Singles draw – Doubles draw	(United States) Lawson Duncan; 6–4, 6–2	(United States) Jim Pugh	(Haiti) Ronald Agénor (Spain) Jordi Arrese	(France) Tarik Benhabiles (Spain) Javier Sánchez (Spain) José López-Maeso (West Germany) Wolfgang Popp
March 30	Agadir Challenger; Agadir, Morocco $50,000 – clay – 32S/16D; Singles draw – Doubles draw	(United States) Jim Pugh (Sweden) Magnus Tideman; 2–6, 7–5, 6–2	(West Germany) Tore Meinecke (West Germany) Carl-Uwe Steeb	(Haiti) Ronald Agénor (Spain) Jordi Arrese	(France) Tarik Benhabiles (Spain) Javier Sánchez (Spain) José López-Maeso (West Germany) Wolfgang Popp
March 30	Vienna Challenger; Vienna, Austria $25,000 – hard (I) – 32S/16D; Singles draw – Doubles draw	(France) Éric Winogradsky; 6–3, 6–2	(Australia) Mark Woodforde	(Austria) Michael Oberleitner (Romania) Florin Segărceanu	(West Germany) Hans-Dieter Beutel (Austria) Alex Antonitsch (Denmark) Michael Tauson (Australia) Anthony Lane
March 30	Vienna Challenger; Vienna, Austria $25,000 – hard (I) – 32S/16D; Singles draw – Doubles draw	(Czechoslovakia) Jaroslav Navrátil (Romania) Florin Segărceanu; 6–4, 6–4	(New Zealand) Steve Guy (New Zealand) David Lewis	(Austria) Michael Oberleitner (Romania) Florin Segărceanu	(West Germany) Hans-Dieter Beutel (Austria) Alex Antonitsch (Denmark) Michael Tauson (Australia) Anthony Lane

=== April ===
Week of	Tournament	Champions	Runners-up	Semifinalists	Quarterfinalists
April 6	S Tennis Masters Challenger; Graz, Austria $50,000 – hard (I) – 32S/16D; Singles draw – Doubles draw	(West Germany) Christian Saceanu; 5–7, 6–3, 6–4	(Australia) Mark Woodforde	(Czechoslovakia) Jaroslav Navrátil (Sweden) Stefan Eriksson	(Sweden) Jan Gunnarsson (Australia) Carl Limberger (West Germany) Patrik Kühnen (Austria) Thomas Muster
April 6	S Tennis Masters Challenger; Graz, Austria $50,000 – hard (I) – 32S/16D; Singles draw – Doubles draw	(Canada) Grant Connell (United States) David Livingston; 7–5, 6–3	(Australia) Carl Limberger (Australia) Mark Woodforde	(Czechoslovakia) Jaroslav Navrátil (Sweden) Stefan Eriksson	(Sweden) Jan Gunnarsson (Australia) Carl Limberger (West Germany) Patrik Kühnen (Austria) Thomas Muster
April 6	Martinique Challenger; Martinique, French West Indies $25,000 – hard – 32S/16D; Singles draw – Doubles draw	(Australia) Peter Doohan; 6–3, 6–2	(United States) Todd Nelson	(Chile) Ricardo Acuña (Colombia) Álvaro Jordan	(United States) Paul Chamberlin (West Germany) Alex Stepanek (Jamaica) Doug Burke (United Kingdom) Nick Fulwood
April 6	Martinique Challenger; Martinique, French West Indies $25,000 – hard – 32S/16D; Singles draw – Doubles draw	(Denmark) Morten Christensen (Sweden) Lars-Anders Wahlgren; 7–6, 6–3	(United Kingdom) Jeremy Bates (United Kingdom) Nick Fulwood	(Chile) Ricardo Acuña (Colombia) Álvaro Jordan	(United States) Paul Chamberlin (West Germany) Alex Stepanek (Jamaica) Doug Burke (United Kingdom) Nick Fulwood
April 13	Guadeloupe Challenger; Guadeloupe, French West Indies $25,000 – hard – 32S/16D; Singles draw – Doubles draw	(United States) Jonathan Canter; 6–3, 6–4	(United States) Larry Stefanki	(United Kingdom) Jeremy Bates (Australia) Peter Carter	(United States) Mike Bauer (United States) Marc Flur (Netherlands) Tom Nijssen (Australia) Peter Doohan
April 13	Guadeloupe Challenger; Guadeloupe, French West Indies $25,000 – hard – 32S/16D; Singles draw – Doubles draw	(Brazil) Nelson Aerts (United States) Brett Dickinson; 6–2, 6–3	(United States) Jonathan Canter (Belgium) Denis Langaskens	(United Kingdom) Jeremy Bates (Australia) Peter Carter	(United States) Mike Bauer (United States) Marc Flur (Netherlands) Tom Nijssen (Australia) Peter Doohan
April 13	Parioli Challenger; Rome, Italy $25,000 – clay – 32S/16D; Singles draw – Doubles draw	(Peru) Carlos di Laura; 6–3, 6–2	(Argentina) Guillermo Pérez Roldán	(Spain) Eduardo Osta (Paraguay) Hugo Chapacú	(Italy) Massimo Cierro (Italy) Edoardo Mazza (Argentina) Marcelo Ingaramo (Argentina) Franco Davín
April 13	Parioli Challenger; Rome, Italy $25,000 – clay – 32S/16D; Singles draw – Doubles draw	(United States) Mark Basham (United States) Brett Buffington; 4–6, 6–2, 6–1	(Italy) Massimo Cierro (Italy) Alessandro de Minicis	(Spain) Eduardo Osta (Paraguay) Hugo Chapacú	(Italy) Massimo Cierro (Italy) Edoardo Mazza (Argentina) Marcelo Ingaramo (Argentina) Franco Davín
April 13	San Luis Potosí Challenger; San Luis Potosí, Mexico $25,000 – clay – 32S/16D; Singles draw – Doubles draw	(Mexico) Leonardo Lavalle; 6–4, 3–6, 6–4	(Mexico) Jorge Lozano	(Canada) Stéphane Bonneau (Canada) Chris Pridham	(United States) Mark Wilder (Canada) Hatem McDadi (Italy) Luca Bottazzi (Mexico) Eduardo Vélez
April 13	San Luis Potosí Challenger; San Luis Potosí, Mexico $25,000 – clay – 32S/16D; Singles draw – Doubles draw	(United States) John Letts (United States) Rick Rudeen; 6–3, 6–4	(United States) Karl Richter (United States) Mark Wooldridge	(Canada) Stéphane Bonneau (Canada) Chris Pridham	(United States) Mark Wilder (Canada) Hatem McDadi (Italy) Luca Bottazzi (Mexico) Eduardo Vélez
April 20	Jerusalem Challenger; Jerusalem, Israel $25,000 – hard – 32S/16D; Singles draw – Doubles draw	(Israel) Shahar Perkiss; 4–6, 7–6, 6–2	(West Germany) Christian Saceanu	(West Germany) Alexander Mronz (Sweden) David Engel	(Israel) Boaz Merenstein (Denmark) Morten Christensen (United States) Larry Scott (Denmark) Michael Tauson
April 20	Jerusalem Challenger; Jerusalem, Israel $25,000 – hard – 32S/16D; Singles draw – Doubles draw	(Israel) Gilad Bloom (Israel) Shahar Perkiss; 7–5, 7–5	(Israel) Shlomo Glickstein (Israel) Amos Mansdorf	(West Germany) Alexander Mronz (Sweden) David Engel	(Israel) Boaz Merenstein (Denmark) Morten Christensen (United States) Larry Scott (Denmark) Michael Tauson
April 20	Lisbon Challenger; Lisbon, Portugal $25,000 – clay – 32S/16D; Singles draw – Doubles draw	(Peru) Carlos di Laura; 6–1, 6–3	(Spain) Jesús Colás	(Italy) Massimo Cierro (Spain) Alberto Tous	(Spain) José López-Maeso (France) Thierry Pham (Spain) Juan Aguilera (Italy) Francesco Cancellotti
April 20	Lisbon Challenger; Lisbon, Portugal $25,000 – clay – 32S/16D; Singles draw – Doubles draw	(United States) Mark Dickson (Sweden) Magnus Tideman; 6–2, 6–4	(Spain) José López-Maeso (Spain) Alberto Tous	(Italy) Massimo Cierro (Spain) Alberto Tous	(Spain) José López-Maeso (France) Thierry Pham (Spain) Juan Aguilera (Italy) Francesco Cancellotti
April 27	Nagoya Challenger; Nagoya, Japan $50,000 – hard – 32S/16D; Singles draw – Doubles draw	(India) Ramesh Krishnan; 6–3, 6–0	(United States) Jay Lapidus	(United Kingdom) Andrew Castle (United States) Eric Korita	(United States) Andy Kohlberg (United States) Jon Levine (United States) Michael Kures (United States) Robert Van't Hof
April 27	Nagoya Challenger; Nagoya, Japan $50,000 – hard – 32S/16D; Singles draw – Doubles draw	(United Kingdom) Andrew Castle (United States) Jon Levine; 7–6, 7–6	(New Zealand) Steve Guy (New Zealand) David Mustard	(United Kingdom) Andrew Castle (United States) Eric Korita	(United States) Andy Kohlberg (United States) Jon Levine (United States) Michael Kures (United States) Robert Van't Hof
April 27	Porto Challenger; Porto, Portugal $25,000 – clay – 32S/16D; Singles draw – Doubles draw	(Sweden) Christian Bergström; 6–1, 6–3	(Austria) Alex Antonitsch	(Italy) Francesco Cancellotti (Chile) Pedro Rebolledo	(West Germany) Hans-Dieter Beutel (Australia) Mark Woodforde (United States) Mark Dickson (Spain) Juan Aguilera
April 27	Porto Challenger; Porto, Portugal $25,000 – clay – 32S/16D; Singles draw – Doubles draw	(Sweden) Conny Falk (Sweden) Stefan Svensson; 7–5, 5–7, 6–3	(Sweden) Ronnie Båthman (Denmark) Michael Tauson	(Italy) Francesco Cancellotti (Chile) Pedro Rebolledo	(West Germany) Hans-Dieter Beutel (Australia) Mark Woodforde (United States) Mark Dickson (Spain) Juan Aguilera

=== May ===
Week of	Tournament	Champions	Runners-up	Semifinalists	Quarterfinalists
May 4	No tournaments scheduled.				
May 11	Raleigh Challenger; Raleigh, United States $25,000 – clay – 32S/16D; Singles draw – Doubles draw	(United States) Jimmy Brown; 1–6, 6–0, 6–1	(United States) Al Parker	(South Africa) Gary Muller (United States) Marc Flur	(Chile) Ricardo Acuña (United States) John Sadri (United States) Wayne Hearn (United States) Mike De Palmer
May 11	Raleigh Challenger; Raleigh, United States $25,000 – clay – 32S/16D; Singles draw – Doubles draw	(United States) Rill Baxter (United States) Mike De Palmer; 7–5, 2–6, 6–4	(South Africa) Brian Levine (Australia) David Macpherson	(South Africa) Gary Muller (United States) Marc Flur	(Chile) Ricardo Acuña (United States) John Sadri (United States) Wayne Hearn (United States) Mike De Palmer
May 11	Waiblingen Challenger; Waiblingen, West Germany $50,000 – clay – 32S/16D; Singles draw – Doubles draw	(Spain) Alberto Tous w/o	(Switzerland) Roland Stadler	(France) Jean-Philippe Fleurian (Austria) Alex Antonitsch	(France) Thierry Champion (Sweden) Peter Lundgren (West Germany) Ivo Werner (Socialist Federal Republic of Yugoslavia) Marko Ostoja
May 11	Waiblingen Challenger; Waiblingen, West Germany $50,000 – clay – 32S/16D; Singles draw – Doubles draw	(Czechoslovakia) Jaroslav Navrátil (Australia) Mark Woodforde; 6–3, 7–5	(Austria) Alex Antonitsch (Sweden) Peter Lundgren	(France) Jean-Philippe Fleurian (Austria) Alex Antonitsch	(France) Thierry Champion (Sweden) Peter Lundgren (West Germany) Ivo Werner (Socialist Federal Republic of Yugoslavia) Marko Ostoja
May 18	No tournaments scheduled.				
May 25	Montabaur Challenger; Montabaur, West Germany $25,000 – clay – 32S/16D; Singles draw – Doubles draw	(Sweden) Niclas Kroon; 6–1, 6–3	(West Germany) Wolfgang Popp	(West Germany) Christian Weis (Italy) Edoardo Mazza	(Brazil) Danilo Marcelino (Sweden) David Engel (Spain) Jesús Colás (Portugal) Nuno Marques
May 25	Montabaur Challenger; Montabaur, West Germany $25,000 – clay – 32S/16D; Singles draw – Doubles draw	(West Germany) Axel Hornung (West Germany) Christian Saceanu; 6–3, 6–4	(Mexico) Jorge Lozano (Mexico) Agustín Moreno	(West Germany) Christian Weis (Italy) Edoardo Mazza	(Brazil) Danilo Marcelino (Sweden) David Engel (Spain) Jesús Colás (Portugal) Nuno Marques

=== June ===
Week of	Tournament	Champions	Runners-up	Semifinalists	Quarterfinalists
June 1	Dortmund Challenger; Dortmund, West Germany $50,000 – clay – 32S/16D; Singles draw – Doubles draw	(Haiti) Ronald Agénor; 4–6, 7–5, 6–3	(Socialist Federal Republic of Yugoslavia) Bruno Orešar	(Sweden) Peter Lundgren (Australia) Carl Limberger	(Mexico) Jorge Lozano (Sweden) Christian Bergström (Argentina) Francisco Yunis (Mexico) Leonardo Lavalle
June 1	Dortmund Challenger; Dortmund, West Germany $50,000 – clay – 32S/16D; Singles draw – Doubles draw	(New Zealand) Bruce Derlin (Netherlands) Menno Oosting; 7–6, 6–7, 6–2	(West Germany) Wolfgang Popp (West Germany) Udo Riglewski	(Sweden) Peter Lundgren (Australia) Carl Limberger	(Mexico) Jorge Lozano (Sweden) Christian Bergström (Argentina) Francisco Yunis (Mexico) Leonardo Lavalle
June 8	No tournaments scheduled.				
June 15	No tournaments scheduled.				
June 22	Clermont-Ferrand Challenger; Clermont-Ferrand, France $50,000 – clay – 32S/16D; Singles draw – Doubles draw	(Socialist Federal Republic of Yugoslavia) Bruno Orešar; 6–2, 6–4	(Belgium) Libor Pimek	(Spain) Jordi Arrese (Switzerland) Claudio Mezzadri	(France) Thierry Champion (West Germany) Hans Schwaier (Italy) Claudio Pistolesi (France) Patrice Kuchna
June 22	Clermont-Ferrand Challenger; Clermont-Ferrand, France $50,000 – clay – 32S/16D; Singles draw – Doubles draw	(Iran) Mansour Bahrami (Switzerland) Claudio Mezzadri; 6–3, 7–5	(France) Christophe Lesage (France) Jean-Marc Piacentile	(Spain) Jordi Arrese (Switzerland) Claudio Mezzadri	(France) Thierry Champion (West Germany) Hans Schwaier (Italy) Claudio Pistolesi (France) Patrice Kuchna
June 29	Tarbes Challenger; Tarbes, France $25,000 – clay – 32S/16D; Singles draw – Doubles draw	(Chile) Pedro Rebolledo; 6–3, 6–4	(Haiti) Ronald Agénor	(Brazil) Marcelo Hennemann (Uruguay) Marcelo Filippini	(Argentina) Marcelo Ingaramo (Sweden) Magnus Gustafsson (Uruguay) Victor Caldarelli (Argentina) Carlos Castellan
June 29	Tarbes Challenger; Tarbes, France $25,000 – clay – 32S/16D; Singles draw – Doubles draw	(Senegal) Yahiya Doumbia (France) Thierry Pham; 7–6, 6–4	(Argentina) Roberto Azar (Argentina) Marcelo Ingaramo	(Brazil) Marcelo Hennemann (Uruguay) Marcelo Filippini	(Argentina) Marcelo Ingaramo (Sweden) Magnus Gustafsson (Uruguay) Victor Caldarelli (Argentina) Carlos Castellan

=== July ===
Week of	Tournament	Champions	Runners-up	Semifinalists	Quarterfinalists
July 6	Dublin Challenger (Republic of Ireland) Dublin, Ireland $25,000 – clay – 32S/16D; Singles draw – Doubles draw	(Italy) Gianluca Pozzi; 7–5, 4–6, 6–2	(Brazil) Alexandre Hocevar	(United States) Kelly Jones (Austria) Michael Oberleitner	(Portugal) Nuno Marques (United States) Rick Rudeen (United Kingdom) Jason Goodall (Italy) Diego Nargiso
July 6	Dublin Challenger (Republic of Ireland) Dublin, Ireland $25,000 – clay – 32S/16D; Singles draw – Doubles draw	(South Africa) Pieter Aldrich (South Africa) Warren Green; 6–7, 6–4, 6–4	(United Kingdom) Jason Goodall (United States) Peter Wright	(United States) Kelly Jones (Austria) Michael Oberleitner	(Portugal) Nuno Marques (United States) Rick Rudeen (United Kingdom) Jason Goodall (Italy) Diego Nargiso
July 6	Tampere Open; Tampere, Finland $25,000 – clay – 32S/16D; Singles draw – Doubles draw	(Sweden) Magnus Gustafsson; 6–2, 6–4	(Sweden) Conny Falk	(Denmark) Peter Bastiansen (Sweden) Christer Allgårdh	(United States) Steve Kennedy (Argentina) Carlos Castellan (Sweden) David Engel (Finland) Veli Paloheimo
July 6	Tampere Open; Tampere, Finland $25,000 – clay – 32S/16D; Singles draw – Doubles draw	(Sweden) David Engel (Australia) Des Tyson; 6–3, 3–6, 6–3	(Sweden) Christer Allgårdh (Greece) George Kalovelonis	(Denmark) Peter Bastiansen (Sweden) Christer Allgårdh	(United States) Steve Kennedy (Argentina) Carlos Castellan (Sweden) David Engel (Finland) Veli Paloheimo
July 6	Travemünde Challenger; Travemünde, West Germany $25,000 – clay – 32S/16D; Singles draw – Doubles draw	(Sweden) Ronnie Båthman; 6–4, 3–6, 6–4	(Italy) Massimo Cierro	(United Kingdom) Nick Fulwood (Sweden) Niclas Kroon	(Sweden) Lars-Anders Wahlgren (Switzerland) Stefano Mezzadri (Japan) Shuzo Matsuoka (West Germany) Torben Theine
July 6	Travemünde Challenger; Travemünde, West Germany $25,000 – clay – 32S/16D; Singles draw – Doubles draw	(West Germany) Alexander Mronz (West Germany) Karsten Saniter; 6–7, 7–6, 6–4	(Sweden) Niclas Kroon (Sweden) Mats Oleen	(United Kingdom) Nick Fulwood (Sweden) Niclas Kroon	(Sweden) Lars-Anders Wahlgren (Switzerland) Stefano Mezzadri (Japan) Shuzo Matsuoka (West Germany) Torben Theine
July 13	No tournaments scheduled.				
July 20	Franken Challenge; Fürth, West Germany $25,000 – clay – 32S/16D; Singles draw – Doubles draw	(West Germany) Patrick Baur; 6–3, 7–5	(Italy) Edoardo Mazza	(Spain) Jesús Colás (Sweden) Niclas Kroon	(West Germany) Jaromir Becka (Czechoslovakia) Josef Čihák (Czechoslovakia) Branislav Stankovič (West Germany) Michael Kupferschmid
July 20	Franken Challenge; Fürth, West Germany $25,000 – clay – 32S/16D; Singles draw – Doubles draw	(United Kingdom) Nick Fulwood (Czechoslovakia) Cyril Suk; 4–6, 6–3, 6–2	(West Germany) Axel Hornung (West Germany) Karsten Saniter	(Spain) Jesús Colás (Sweden) Niclas Kroon	(West Germany) Jaromir Becka (Czechoslovakia) Josef Čihák (Czechoslovakia) Branislav Stankovič (West Germany) Michael Kupferschmid
July 20	Hanko Challenger; Hanko, Finland $50,000 – clay – 32S/16D; Singles draw – Doubles draw	(Sweden) Per Henricsson; 6–4, 3–6, 6–2	(Sweden) Magnus Gustafsson	(Sweden) Jörgen Windahl (Sweden) Christer Allgårdh	(Sweden) Ulf Stenlund (Spain) Jorge Bardou (Sweden) Magnus Tideman (Finland) Pasi Montonen
July 20	Hanko Challenger; Hanko, Finland $50,000 – clay – 32S/16D; Singles draw – Doubles draw	(Finland) Mika Hedman (Finland) Veli Paloheimo; 5–7, 6–3, 6–2	(South Africa) Craig Campbell (Australia) Des Tyson	(Sweden) Jörgen Windahl (Sweden) Christer Allgårdh	(Sweden) Ulf Stenlund (Spain) Jorge Bardou (Sweden) Magnus Tideman (Finland) Pasi Montonen
July 27	Campos Challenger; Campos, Brazil $25,000 – clay – 32S/16D; Singles draw – Doubles draw	(Brazil) Luiz Mattar; 6–3, 6–1	(Brazil) Cássio Motta	(Brazil) Júlio Góes (Brazil) José Daher	(Brazil) Luis Ruette (Brazil) Carlos Kirmayr (Chile) Ricardo Acuña (Brazil) Fernando Roese
July 27	Campos Challenger; Campos, Brazil $25,000 – clay – 32S/16D; Singles draw – Doubles draw	(Brazil) Ivan Kley (Brazil) João Soares; 6–2, 7–6	(Brazil) Carlos Kirmayr (Brazil) Danilo Marcelino	(Brazil) Júlio Góes (Brazil) José Daher	(Brazil) Luis Ruette (Brazil) Carlos Kirmayr (Chile) Ricardo Acuña (Brazil) Fernando Roese
July 27	Neu-Ulm Challenger; Neu-Ulm, West Germany $25,000 – clay – 32S/16D; Singles draw – Doubles draw	(Czechoslovakia) Tomáš Šmíd; 6–3, 6–4	(France) Thierry Champion	(Czechoslovakia) Milan Šrejber (Czechoslovakia) Josef Čihák	(Argentina) Christian Miniussi (West Germany) Tore Meinecke (Argentina) Marcelo Ingaramo (Italy) Massimo Cierro
July 27	Seattle Challenger (United States) Seattle, USA $25,000 – hard – 32S/16D; Singles draw – Doubles draw	(Canada) Andrew Sznajder; 6–4, 4–6, 6–3	(United States) Lloyd Bourne	(United States) Patrick McEnroe (United States) Todd Nelson	(Mexico) Francisco Maciel (United States) Rick Leach (Canada) Chris Pridham (Canada) Grant Connell
July 27	Seattle Challenger (United States) Seattle, USA $25,000 – hard – 32S/16D; Singles draw – Doubles draw	(United States) Rick Leach (United States) Patrick McEnroe; 5–7, 6–2, 6–3	(South Africa) Brian Levine (Australia) David Macpherson	(United States) Patrick McEnroe (United States) Todd Nelson	(Mexico) Francisco Maciel (United States) Rick Leach (Canada) Chris Pridham (Canada) Grant Connell

=== August ===
Week of	Tournament	Champions	Runners-up	Semifinalists	Quarterfinalists
August 3	São Paulo-2 Challenger; São Paulo, Brazil $25,000 – clay – 32S/16D; Singles draw – Doubles draw	(Uruguay) Marcelo Filippini; 6–2, 7–6	(Brazil) José Daher	(Brazil) João Soares (Brazil) Júlio Góes	(Brazil) Ivan Kley (Chile) Juan Pablo Queirolo (Austria) Stefan Lochbihler (Brazil) Givaldo Barbosa
August 3	São Paulo-2 Challenger; São Paulo, Brazil $25,000 – clay – 32S/16D; Singles draw – Doubles draw	(Brazil) José Daher (Brazil) Eleutério Martins; 6–3, 7–6	(Brazil) Ricardo Acioly (Brazil) Dácio Campos	(Brazil) João Soares (Brazil) Júlio Góes	(Brazil) Ivan Kley (Chile) Juan Pablo Queirolo (Austria) Stefan Lochbihler (Brazil) Givaldo Barbosa
August 10	Knokke Challenger; Knokke, Belgium $25,000 – clay – 32S/16D; Singles draw – Doubles draw	(Italy) Edoardo Mazza; 7–6, 6–4	(Argentina) Eduardo Masso	(India) Srinivasan Vasudevan (Sweden) Nicklas Utgren	(Denmark) Michael Tauson (Switzerland) Stefano Mezzadri (Spain) Daniel Marco (Spain) Francisco Roig
August 10	Knokke Challenger; Knokke, Belgium $25,000 – clay – 32S/16D; Singles draw – Doubles draw	(Sweden) Anders Henricsson (Sweden) Per Henricsson; 6–1, 6–3	(Brazil) Givaldo Barbosa (Italy) Nevio Devide	(India) Srinivasan Vasudevan (Sweden) Nicklas Utgren	(Denmark) Michael Tauson (Switzerland) Stefano Mezzadri (Spain) Daniel Marco (Spain) Francisco Roig
August 10	New Haven Challenger; New Haven, United States $25,000 – hard – 32S/16D; Singles draw – Doubles draw	(Australia) Darren Cahill; 6–0, 6–3	(United States) Dan Cassidy	(United States) Rick Leach (United States) Dan Goldberg	(United States) Jay Lapidus (United States) Steve DeVries (United States) Glenn Layendecker (United States) Todd Nelson
August 10	New Haven Challenger; New Haven, United States $25,000 – hard – 32S/16D; Singles draw – Doubles draw	(United States) Glenn Layendecker (Canada) Glenn Michibata; 3–6, 6–4, 6–2	(Israel) Gilad Bloom (United States) Brad Pearce	(United States) Rick Leach (United States) Dan Goldberg	(United States) Jay Lapidus (United States) Steve DeVries (United States) Glenn Layendecker (United States) Todd Nelson
August 17	PTT İstanbul Cup; Istanbul, Turkey $25,000 – clay – 32S/16D; Singles draw – Doubles draw	(Czechoslovakia) Branislav Stankovič; 6–2, 6–1	(Romania) Florin Segărceanu	(Italy) Edoardo Mazza (Czechoslovakia) Josef Čihák	(Israel) Amit Naor (Soviet Union) Ģirts Dzelde (United Kingdom) Nick Fulwood (India) Srinivasan Vasudevan
August 17	PTT İstanbul Cup; Istanbul, Turkey $25,000 – clay – 32S/16D; Singles draw – Doubles draw	(Italy) Nevio Devide (Italy) Alberto Paris; 7–5, 6–2	(Romania) Adrian Marcu (Romania) Florin Segărceanu	(Italy) Edoardo Mazza (Czechoslovakia) Josef Čihák	(Israel) Amit Naor (Soviet Union) Ģirts Dzelde (United Kingdom) Nick Fulwood (India) Srinivasan Vasudevan
August 17	Nielsen Pro Tennis Championship (United States) Winnetka, USA $25,000 – hard – 32S/16D; Singles draw – Doubles draw	(Australia) Simon Youl; 5–7, 7–6, 6–3	(Argentina) Roberto Saad	(Australia) Mark Woodforde (Canada) Chris Pridham	(United States) Dan Goldberg (United States) Andy Kohlberg (United States) Jeff Tarango (United States) Joey Rive
August 17	Nielsen Pro Tennis Championship (United States) Winnetka, USA $25,000 – hard – 32S/16D; Singles draw – Doubles draw	(Sweden) Tobias Svantesson (United States) Jon Treml; 6–3, 6–4	(South Africa) Pieter Aldrich (South Africa) Warren Green	(Australia) Mark Woodforde (Canada) Chris Pridham	(United States) Dan Goldberg (United States) Andy Kohlberg (United States) Jeff Tarango (United States) Joey Rive
August 24	No tournaments scheduled.				
August 31	Budapest Challenger; Budapest, Hungary $25,000 – clay – 32S/16D; Singles draw – Doubles draw	(Czechoslovakia) Petr Korda; 5–7, 6–3, 6–2	(Soviet Union) Alexander Zverev	(Czechoslovakia) Branislav Stankovič (Switzerland) Roland Stadler	(Romania) Florin Segărceanu (Czechoslovakia) Josef Čihák (Argentina) Eduardo Masso (Romania) Adrian Marcu
August 31	Budapest Challenger; Budapest, Hungary $25,000 – clay – 32S/16D; Singles draw – Doubles draw	(Czechoslovakia) Josef Čihák (Czechoslovakia) Cyril Suk; 6–2, 7–6	(Sweden) Christer Allgårdh (Sweden) David Engel	(Czechoslovakia) Branislav Stankovič (Switzerland) Roland Stadler	(Romania) Florin Segărceanu (Czechoslovakia) Josef Čihák (Argentina) Eduardo Masso (Romania) Adrian Marcu

=== September ===
Week of	Tournament	Champions	Runners-up	Semifinalists	Quarterfinalists
September 7	Thessaloniki Challenger; Thessaloniki, Greece $25,000 – hard – 32S/16D; Singles draw – Doubles draw	(Canada) Martin Laurendeau; 7–6, 6–4	(Sweden) Niclas Kroon	(United Kingdom) Chris Bailey (Mexico) Agustín Moreno	(New Zealand) Steve Guy (South Africa) Pieter Aldrich (Greece) Anastasios Bavelas (Japan) Shuzo Matsuoka
September 7	Thessaloniki Challenger; Thessaloniki, Greece $25,000 – hard – 32S/16D; Singles draw – Doubles draw	(Sweden) Per Henricsson (Sweden) Henrik Holm; 7–6, 3–6, 6–3	(South Africa) Pieter Aldrich (Denmark) Morten Christensen	(United Kingdom) Chris Bailey (Mexico) Agustín Moreno	(New Zealand) Steve Guy (South Africa) Pieter Aldrich (Greece) Anastasios Bavelas (Japan) Shuzo Matsuoka
September 14	No tournaments scheduled.				
September 21	No tournaments scheduled.				
September 28	Brisbane Challenger; Brisbane, Australia $25,000 – hard – 64S/32D; Singles draw – Doubles draw	(Australia) John Frawley; 6–2, 6–2	(Australia) Mark Kratzmann	(Australia) Broderick Dyke (Australia) Richard Fromberg	(Australia) Jason Stoltenberg (Australia) Bryan Roe (Australia) Peter Carter (Australia) Charlton Eagle
September 28	Brisbane Challenger; Brisbane, Australia $25,000 – hard – 64S/32D; Singles draw – Doubles draw	(Australia) Jason Stoltenberg (Australia) Todd Woodbridge; 6–3, 7–5	(Australia) Steve Furlong (United States) Peter Wright	(Australia) Broderick Dyke (Australia) Richard Fromberg	(Australia) Jason Stoltenberg (Australia) Bryan Roe (Australia) Peter Carter (Australia) Charlton Eagle
September 28	Coquitlam Challenger; Coquitlam, Canada $25,000 – hard – 32S/16D; Singles draw – Doubles draw	(Canada) Stéphane Bonneau; 6–1, 0–6, 6–4	(Jamaica) Doug Burke	(United States) Michael Robertson (Canada) Glenn Michibata	(United States) Richard Matuszewski (United States) Matthew Litsky (Puerto Rico) Juan Ríos (Canada) Grant Connell
September 28	Coquitlam Challenger; Coquitlam, Canada $25,000 – hard – 32S/16D; Singles draw – Doubles draw	(Canada) Grant Connell (Canada) Glenn Michibata; 7–6, 5–7, 6–4	(Puerto Rico) Juan Ríos (The Bahamas) Roger Smith	(United States) Michael Robertson (Canada) Glenn Michibata	(United States) Richard Matuszewski (United States) Matthew Litsky (Puerto Rico) Juan Ríos (Canada) Grant Connell
September 28	Portugal Open; Estoril, Portugal $50,000 – clay – 32S/16D; Singles draw – Doubles draw	(Israel) Gilad Bloom; 7–6, 6–3	(United States) Mark Dickson	(Argentina) Eduardo Masso (United States) Brett Dickinson	(Brazil) João Soares (Italy) Gianluca Pozzi (Netherlands) Huub van Boeckel (Canada) Martin Laurendeau
September 28	Portugal Open; Estoril, Portugal $50,000 – clay – 32S/16D; Singles draw – Doubles draw	(South Africa) Barry Moir (Italy) Gianluca Pozzi; 6–4, 3–6, 7–6	(Israel) Gilad Bloom (Sweden) Niclas Kroon	(Argentina) Eduardo Masso (United States) Brett Dickinson	(Brazil) João Soares (Italy) Gianluca Pozzi (Netherlands) Huub van Boeckel (Canada) Martin Laurendeau

=== October ===
Week of	Tournament	Champions	Runners-up	Semifinalists	Quarterfinalists
October 5	International Tournament of Messina; Messina, Italy $50,000 – clay – 32S/16D; Singles draw – Doubles draw	(West Germany) Hans Schwaier; 6–3, 4–6, 6–4	(West Germany) Markus Rackl	(Mexico) Francisco Maciel (Argentina) Alberto Mancini	(Italy) Massimiliano Narducci (Czechoslovakia) Petr Korda (Venezuela) Nicolás Pereira (Italy) Edoardo Mazza
October 5	International Tournament of Messina; Messina, Italy $50,000 – clay – 32S/16D; Singles draw – Doubles draw	(Italy) Omar Camporese (Italy) Diego Nargiso; 6–4, 6–4	(Brazil) Dácio Campos (United States) Brett Dickinson	(Mexico) Francisco Maciel (Argentina) Alberto Mancini	(Italy) Massimiliano Narducci (Czechoslovakia) Petr Korda (Venezuela) Nicolás Pereira (Italy) Edoardo Mazza
October 5	Vancouver Challenger; Vancouver, Canada $25,000 – hard – 32S/16D; Singles draw – Doubles draw	(Canada) Grant Connell; 7–6, 6–1	(West Germany) Alexander Mronz	(West Germany) Heiner Moraing (Canada) Glenn Michibata	(United States) Michael Robertson (United States) Jim Gurfein (United States) Chris Kennedy (Canada) Stéphane Bonneau
October 5	Vancouver Challenger; Vancouver, Canada $25,000 – hard – 32S/16D; Singles draw – Doubles draw	(Canada) Grant Connell (Canada) Glenn Michibata; 6–4, 6–2	(Canada) Josef Brabenec (Canada) Tony Macken	(West Germany) Heiner Moraing (Canada) Glenn Michibata	(United States) Michael Robertson (United States) Jim Gurfein (United States) Chris Kennedy (Canada) Stéphane Bonneau
October 12	Grand Prix Hassan II; Casablanca, Morocco $50,000 – clay – 32S/16D; Singles draw – Doubles draw	(United States) Lawson Duncan; 7–5, 6–1	(Italy) Massimiliano Narducci	(Spain) Alberto Tous (Italy) Massimo Cierro	(West Germany) Hans Schwaier (West Germany) Christian Weis (Italy) Claudio Pistolesi (Czechoslovakia) Josef Čihák
October 12	Grand Prix Hassan II; Casablanca, Morocco $50,000 – clay – 32S/16D; Singles draw – Doubles draw	(Spain) José López-Maeso (Spain) Alberto Tous; 7–6, 6–2	(Italy) Massimo Cierro (Italy) Alessandro de Minicis	(Spain) Alberto Tous (Italy) Massimo Cierro	(West Germany) Hans Schwaier (West Germany) Christian Weis (Italy) Claudio Pistolesi (Czechoslovakia) Josef Čihák
October 12	Las Vegas Challenger (United States) Las Vegas, USA $25,000 – hard – 32S/16D; Singles draw – Doubles draw	(United States) Michael Chang; 6–3, 4–6, 6–2	(United States) Jon Levine	(India) Vijay Amritraj (Canada) Grant Connell	(United States) Paul Chamberlin (West Germany) Alexander Mronz (United States) Glenn Layendecker (United States) Jim Gurfein
October 12	Las Vegas Challenger (United States) Las Vegas, USA $25,000 – hard – 32S/16D; Singles draw – Doubles draw	(United States) David Dowlen (United States) Glenn Layendecker; 6–1, 6–2	(United States) Mark Basham (United States) Charles Beckman	(India) Vijay Amritraj (Canada) Grant Connell	(United States) Paul Chamberlin (West Germany) Alexander Mronz (United States) Glenn Layendecker (United States) Jim Gurfein
October 19	No tournaments scheduled.				
October 26	Bergen Challenger; Bergen, Norway $75,000 – carpet (I) – 32S/16D; Singles draw – Doubles draw	(West Germany) Patrik Kühnen; 6–4, 3–6, 7–6	(Canada) Grant Connell	(Czechoslovakia) Petr Korda (United States) Leif Shiras	(Sweden) Jan Gunnarsson (Soviet Union) Andrei Olhovskiy (Sweden) Niclas Kroon (Czechoslovakia) Milan Šrejber
October 26	Bergen Challenger; Bergen, Norway $75,000 – carpet (I) – 32S/16D; Singles draw – Doubles draw	(Nigeria) Nduka Odizor (United States) Ben Testerman; 6–3, 6–4	(Sweden) Jan Gunnarsson (Denmark) Michael Mortensen	(Czechoslovakia) Petr Korda (United States) Leif Shiras	(Sweden) Jan Gunnarsson (Soviet Union) Andrei Olhovskiy (Sweden) Niclas Kroon (Czechoslovakia) Milan Šrejber

=== November ===
Week of	Tournament	Champions	Runners-up	Semifinalists	Quarterfinalists
November 2	Bossonnens Challenger; Bossonnens, Switzerland $25,000 – hard (I) – 32S/16D; Singles draw – Doubles draw	(The Bahamas) Roger Smith; 7–6, 4–6, 6–3	(West Germany) Alexander Mronz	(Argentina) Eduardo Masso (United States) Richard Matuszewski	(Puerto Rico) Miguel Nido (West Germany) Patrick Baur (West Germany) Markus Rackl (United States) Mike Bauer
November 2	Bossonnens Challenger; Bossonnens, Switzerland $25,000 – hard (I) – 32S/16D; Singles draw – Doubles draw	(United States) Peter Palandjian (United States) Bud Schultz; 6–4, 6–3	(West Germany) Heiner Moraing (West Germany) Alexander Mronz	(Argentina) Eduardo Masso (United States) Richard Matuszewski	(Puerto Rico) Miguel Nido (West Germany) Patrick Baur (West Germany) Markus Rackl (United States) Mike Bauer
November 2	Jakarta Challenger; Jakarta, Indonesia $25,000 – hard – 32S/16D; Singles draw – Doubles draw	(Australia) Broderick Dyke; 6-3, 2–0, Ret.	(United States) Paul Chamberlin	(United States) Jon Levine (Netherlands) Huub van Boeckel	(Indonesia) Suharyadi Suharyadi (New Zealand) Steve Guy (Japan) Shuzo Matsuoka (United Kingdom) Jason Goodall
November 2	Jakarta Challenger; Jakarta, Indonesia $25,000 – hard – 32S/16D; Singles draw – Doubles draw	(New Zealand) Steve Guy (United States) Jon Levine; 6–7, 6–4, 6–3	(Indonesia) Suharyadi Suharyadi (Indonesia) Donald Wailan-Walalangi	(United States) Jon Levine (Netherlands) Huub van Boeckel	(Indonesia) Suharyadi Suharyadi (New Zealand) Steve Guy (Japan) Shuzo Matsuoka (United Kingdom) Jason Goodall
November 2	Chilean Open; Santiago, Chile $25,000 – clay – 32S/16D; Singles draw – Doubles draw	(Argentina) Javier Frana; 2–6, 6–3, 6–4	(Argentina) Alberto Mancini	(Argentina) Pablo Albano (United States) Dan Cassidy	(Argentina) Guillermo Rivas (Chile) Rubén Gajardo (Argentina) Marcelo Ingaramo (Argentina) Gustavo Giussani
November 2	Chilean Open; Santiago, Chile $25,000 – clay – 32S/16D; Singles draw – Doubles draw	(Argentina) Javier Frana (Chile) Hans Gildemeister; 6–4, 6–3	(Brazil) Marcos Hocevar (Brazil) Alexandre Hocevar	(Argentina) Pablo Albano (United States) Dan Cassidy	(Argentina) Guillermo Rivas (Chile) Rubén Gajardo (Argentina) Marcelo Ingaramo (Argentina) Gustavo Giussani
November 9	Helsinki Challenger; Helsinki, Finland $25,000 – carpet (I) – 32S/16D; Singles draw – Doubles draw	(Canada) Grant Connell; 7–6, 6–2	(Soviet Union) Alexander Zverev	(United States) Bud Schultz (Finland) Olli Rahnasto	(Sweden) Per Henricsson (Sweden) Anders Henricsson (Soviet Union) Andrei Olhovskiy (Sweden) Ronnie Båthman
November 9	Helsinki Challenger; Helsinki, Finland $25,000 – carpet (I) – 32S/16D; Singles draw – Doubles draw	(United States) Peter Palandjian (United States) Bud Schultz; 7–6, 6–4	(Sweden) Nicklas Utgren (Finland) Pasi Virtanen	(United States) Bud Schultz (Finland) Olli Rahnasto	(Sweden) Per Henricsson (Sweden) Anders Henricsson (Soviet Union) Andrei Olhovskiy (Sweden) Ronnie Båthman
November 16	Valkenswaard Challenger; Valkenswaard, The Netherlands $50,000 – carpet (I) – 32S/16D; Singles draw – Doubles draw	(West Germany) Christian Saceanu; 2–6, 6–4, 6–4	(Netherlands) Menno Oosting	(Czechoslovakia) Petr Korda (Netherlands) Jan-Willem Lodder	(France) Jérôme Potier (United States) Lloyd Bourne (Argentina) Eduardo Masso (West Germany) Peter Moraing
November 16	Valkenswaard Challenger; Valkenswaard, The Netherlands $50,000 – carpet (I) – 32S/16D; Singles draw – Doubles draw	(Netherlands) Michiel Schapers (Netherlands) Huub van Boeckel; 3–6, 6–3, 6–2	(Australia) Peter Carter (United States) Leif Shiras	(Czechoslovakia) Petr Korda (Netherlands) Jan-Willem Lodder	(France) Jérôme Potier (United States) Lloyd Bourne (Argentina) Eduardo Masso (West Germany) Peter Moraing
November 23	Bloemfontein Challenger; Bloemfontein, South Africa $25,000 – hard – 64S/32D; Singles draw – Doubles draw	(United States) Philip Johnson; 6–2, 6–4	(United States) Mike Bauer	(United States) Luke Jensen (South Africa) Christo Steyn	(South Africa) Warren Green (West Germany) Harald Rittersbacher (South Africa) Emile Fourie (South Africa) Pieter Aldrich
November 23	Bloemfontein Challenger; Bloemfontein, South Africa $25,000 – hard – 64S/32D; Singles draw – Doubles draw	(United Kingdom) David Felgate (United Kingdom) Nick Fulwood; 6–1, 3–6, 6–4	(United States) Mike Bauer (United States) Peter Palandjian	(United States) Luke Jensen (South Africa) Christo Steyn	(South Africa) Warren Green (West Germany) Harald Rittersbacher (South Africa) Emile Fourie (South Africa) Pieter Aldrich
November 23	Munich Challenger; Munich, West Germany $25,000 – carpet (I) – 32S/16D; Singles draw – Doubles draw	(United States) Leif Shiras; 7–6, 6–4	(Italy) Diego Nargiso	(United States) Mark Dickson (Czechoslovakia) Petr Korda	(The Bahamas) Roger Smith (Romania) Florin Segărceanu (Netherlands) Menno Oosting (United Kingdom) Andrew Castle
November 23	Munich Challenger; Munich, West Germany $25,000 – carpet (I) – 32S/16D; Singles draw – Doubles draw	(Nigeria) Tony Mmoh (The Bahamas) Roger Smith; 7–6, 6–4	(Mexico) Leonardo Lavalle (Italy) Diego Nargiso	(United States) Mark Dickson (Czechoslovakia) Petr Korda	(The Bahamas) Roger Smith (Romania) Florin Segărceanu (Netherlands) Menno Oosting (United Kingdom) Andrew Castle
November 30	Durban Challenger; Durban, South Africa $25,000 – hard – 64S/32D; Singles draw – Doubles draw	(United States) Philip Johnson; 6-2, 2–0, Ret.	(Israel) Tomer Zimmerman	(Australia) Laurie Warder (United States) Michael Robertson	(West Germany) Axel Hornung (South Africa) Stefan Kruger (United States) Luke Jensen (United Kingdom) Neil Broad
November 30	Durban Challenger; Durban, South Africa $25,000 – hard – 64S/32D; Singles draw – Doubles draw	(South Africa) Marius Barnard (South Africa) Piet Norval; 6–3, 6–4	(South Africa) Pieter Aldrich (South Africa) Warren Green	(Australia) Laurie Warder (United States) Michael Robertson	(West Germany) Axel Hornung (South Africa) Stefan Kruger (United States) Luke Jensen (United Kingdom) Neil Broad
November 30	Münster Challenger; Münster, West Germany $75,000 – carpet (I) – 32S/16D; Singles draw – Doubles draw	(West Germany) Eric Jelen; 6–4, 7–6	(Sweden) Jan Gunnarsson	(West Germany) Christian Saceanu (Czechoslovakia) Branislav Stankovič	(Italy) Diego Nargiso (Sweden) Niclas Kroon (United Kingdom) Andrew Castle (United States) Leif Shiras
November 30	Münster Challenger; Münster, West Germany $75,000 – carpet (I) – 32S/16D; Singles draw – Doubles draw	(Czechoslovakia) Karel Nováček (Czechoslovakia) Marián Vajda; 4–6, 7–6, 7–6	(Austria) Alex Antonitsch (Nigeria) Tony Mmoh	(West Germany) Christian Saceanu (Czechoslovakia) Branislav Stankovič	(Italy) Diego Nargiso (Sweden) Niclas Kroon (United Kingdom) Andrew Castle (United States) Leif Shiras
November 30	São Paulo-3 Challenger; São Paulo, Brazil $25,000 – clay – 32S/16D; Singles draw – Doubles draw	(Brazil) Ivan Kley; 6–4, 6–2	(Ecuador) Raúl Viver	(Spain) Juan Aguilera (Argentina) Javier Frana	(Uruguay) Marcelo Filippini (Brazil) Júlio Góes (Argentina) Roberto Argüello (Brazil) Roger Guedes
November 30	São Paulo-3 Challenger; São Paulo, Brazil $25,000 – clay – 32S/16D; Singles draw – Doubles draw	(Uruguay) Marcelo Filippini (Uruguay) Daniel Montes de Oca; 7–5, 4–6, 6–1	(Argentina) Javier Frana (Argentina) Gustavo Guerrero	(Spain) Juan Aguilera (Argentina) Javier Frana	(Uruguay) Marcelo Filippini (Brazil) Júlio Góes (Argentina) Roberto Argüello (Brazil) Roger Guedes

=== December ===
Week of	Tournament	Champions	Runners-up	Semifinalists	Quarterfinalists
December 7	East London Challenger; East London, South Africa $25,000 – hard – 64S/32D; Singles draw – Doubles draw	(South Africa) Pieter Aldrich; 6–3, 6–2	(United States) Mark Keil	(United States) Luke Jensen (South Africa) Barry Moir	(Spain) Daniel Marco (South Africa) Brian Levine (South Africa) Byron Talbot (United States) Derek Tarr
December 7	East London Challenger; East London, South Africa $25,000 – hard – 64S/32D; Singles draw – Doubles draw	(United States) Luke Jensen (South Africa) Byron Talbot; 6–3, 5–7, 6–4	(Switzerland) Stephan Medem (Canada) Geoff Roper	(United States) Luke Jensen (South Africa) Barry Moir	(Spain) Daniel Marco (South Africa) Brian Levine (South Africa) Byron Talbot (United States) Derek Tarr
December 14	Port Elizabeth Challenger; Port Elizabeth, South Africa $25,000 – hard – 64S/32D; Singles draw – Doubles draw	(United States) Michael Robertson; 6–4, 6–2	(South Africa) Denys Maasdorp	(West Germany) Hans-Dieter Beutel (South Africa) Byron Talbot	(South Africa) Pieter Aldrich (South Africa) Brent Pirow (United States) Luke Jensen (United States) Philip Johnson
December 14	Port Elizabeth Challenger; Port Elizabeth, South Africa $25,000 – hard – 64S/32D; Singles draw – Doubles draw	(United Kingdom) Neil Broad (South Africa) Stefan Kruger; 4–6, 6–4, 6–2	(United States) Craig Boynton (United States) Tom Mercer	(West Germany) Hans-Dieter Beutel (South Africa) Byron Talbot	(South Africa) Pieter Aldrich (South Africa) Brent Pirow (United States) Luke Jensen (United States) Philip Johnson
December 21	Cape Town Challenger; Cape Town, South Africa $25,000 – hard – 32S/16D; Singles draw – Doubles draw	(South Africa) Pieter Aldrich; 1–6, 6–4, 6–2	(United States) Mike Bauer	(United States) Luke Jensen (United Kingdom) Neil Broad	(West Germany) Alex Stepanek (South Africa) Christo Steyn (South Africa) Kevin Moir (United States) Philip Johnson
December 21	Cape Town Challenger; Cape Town, South Africa $25,000 – hard – 32S/16D; Singles draw – Doubles draw	(United Kingdom) Neil Broad (South Africa) Stefan Kruger; 6–4, 6–2	(United States) Mike Bauer (United States) Luke Jensen	(United States) Luke Jensen (United Kingdom) Neil Broad	(West Germany) Alex Stepanek (South Africa) Christo Steyn (South Africa) Kevin Moir (United States) Philip Johnson

== Statistical information ==
These tables present the number of singles (S) and doubles (D) titles won by each player and each nation during the season, within all the tournament categories of the 1987 ATP Challenger Series. The players/nations are sorted by: (1) total number of titles (a doubles title won by two players representing the same nation counts as only one win for the nation); (2) a singles > doubles hierarchy; (3) alphabetical order (by family names for players).

=== Titles won by player ===
Total	Player	S	D
5	Grant Connell (CAN)	2	3
4	Carlos di Laura (PER)	2	2
3	Pieter Aldrich (RSA)	2	1
3	Christian Saceanu (FRG)	2	1
3	Alberto Tous (ESP)	2	1
3	Per Henricsson (SWE)	1	2
3	Glenn Michibata (CAN)	0	3
2	Lawson Duncan (USA)	2	0
2	Philip Johnson (USA)	2	0
2	Ronnie Båthman (SWE)	1	1
2	Tarik Benhabiles (FRA)	1	1
2	Gilad Bloom (ISR)	1	1
2	Brett Dickinson (USA)	1	1
2	Marcelo Filippini (URU)	1	1
2	Javier Frana (ARG)	1	1
2	Ivan Kley (BRA)	1	1
2	Jorge Lozano (MEX)	1	1
2	Shahar Perkiss (ISR)	1	1
2	Gianluca Pozzi (ITA)	1	1
2	Leif Shiras (USA)	1	1
2	Roger Smith (BHS)	1	1
2	Neil Broad (GBR)	0	2
2	Nick Fulwood (GBR)	0	2
2	Stefan Kruger (RSA)	0	2
2	Glenn Layendecker (USA)	0	2
2	Jon Levine (USA)	0	2
2	Jaroslav Navrátil (TCH)	0	2
2	Peter Palandjian (USA)	0	2
2	Bud Schultz (USA)	0	2
2	Cyril Suk (TCH)	0	2
2	Magnus Tideman (SWE)	0	2
1	Ronald Agénor (HAI)	1	0
1	Patrick Baur (FRG)	1	0
1	Christian Bergström (SWE)	1	0
1	Stéphane Bonneau (CAN)	1	0
1	Luca Bottazzi (ITA)	1	0
1	Jimmy Brown (USA)	1	0
1	Darren Cahill (AUS)	1	0
1	Jonathan Canter (USA)	1	0
1	Michael Chang (USA)	1	0
1	Peter Doohan (AUS)	1	0
1	Broderick Dyke (AUS)	1	0
1	Stefan Eriksson (SWE)	1	0
1	John Frawley (AUS)	1	0
1	Magnus Gustafsson (SWE)	1	0
1	Eric Jelen (FRG)	1	0
1	Petr Korda (TCH)	1	0
1	Ramesh Krishnan (IND)	1	0
1	Niclas Kroon (SWE)	1	0
1	Patrik Kühnen (FRG)	1	0
1	Martin Laurendeau (CAN)	1	0
1	Leonardo Lavalle (MEX)	1	0
1	Luiz Mattar (BRA)	1	0
1	Edoardo Mazza (ITA)	1	0
1	Peter Moraing (FRG)	1	0
1	Bruno Orešar (YUG)	1	0
1	Pedro Rebolledo (CHI)	1	0
1	Michael Robertson (USA)	1	0
1	Hans Schwaier (FRG)	1	0
1	Tomáš Šmíd (TCH)	1	0
1	Branislav Stankovič (TCH)	1	0
1	Andrew Sznajder (CAN)	1	0
1	Pavel Vojtisek (FRG)	1	0
1	Éric Winogradsky (FRA)	1	0
1	Simon Youl (AUS)	1	0
1	Nelson Aerts (BRA)	0	1
1	Anand Amritraj (IND)	0	1
1	Mansour Bahrami (IRN)	0	1
1	Marius Barnard (RSA)	0	1
1	Mark Basham (USA)	0	1
1	Rill Baxter (USA)	0	1
1	Lloyd Bourne (USA)	0	1
1	Brett Buffington (USA)	0	1
1	Omar Camporese (ITA)	0	1
1	Andrew Castle (GBR)	0	1
1	Paul Chamberlin (USA)	0	1
1	Morten Christensen (DEN)	0	1
1	Josef Čihák (TCH)	0	1
1	Loïc Courteau (FRA)	0	1
1	Jose Daher (BRA)	0	1
1	Mike De Palmer (USA)	0	1
1	Bruce Derlin (NZL)	0	1
1	Nevio Devide (ITA)	0	1
1	Mark Dickson (USA)	0	1
1	Yahiya Doumbia (SEN)	0	1
1	David Dowlen (USA)	0	1
1	David Engel (SWE)	0	1
1	Conny Falk (SWE)	0	1
1	David Felgate (GBR)	0	1
1	Hans Gildemeister (CHI)	0	1
1	Francisco González (PAR)	0	1
1	Warren Green (RSA)	0	1
1	Steve Guy (NZL)	0	1
1	Mika Hedman (FIN)	0	1
1	Anders Henricsson (SWE)	0	1
1	Henrik Holm (SWE)	0	1
1	Axel Hornung (FRG)	0	1
1	Luke Jensen (USA)	0	1
1	Jeff Klaparda (USA)	0	1
1	Rick Leach (USA)	0	1
1	John Letts (USA)	0	1
1	David Livingston (USA)	0	1
1	José López-Maeso (ESP)	0	1
1	Eleutério Martins (BRA)	0	1
1	Patrick McEnroe (USA)	0	1
1	Tore Meinecke (FRG)	0	1
1	Claudio Mezzadri (SUI)	0	1
1	Tony Mmoh (NGR)	0	1
1	Barry Moir (RSA)	0	1
1	Daniel Montes de Oca (URU)	0	1
1	Alexander Mronz (FRG)	0	1
1	Diego Nargiso (ITA)	0	1
1	Piet Norval (RSA)	0	1
1	Karel Nováček (TCH)	0	1
1	Nduka Odizor (NGR)	0	1
1	Menno Oosting (NED)	0	1
1	Veli Paloheimo (FIN)	0	1
1	Alberto Paris (ITA)	0	1
1	Tim Pawsat (USA)	0	1
1	Víctor Pecci (PAR)	0	1
1	Thierry Pham (FRA)	0	1
1	Jim Pugh (USA)	0	1
1	Rick Rudeen (USA)	0	1
1	Karsten Saniter (FRG)	0	1
1	Michiel Schapers (NED)	0	1
1	Florin Segărceanu (ROU)	0	1
1	João Soares (BRA)	0	1
1	Jason Stoltenberg (AUS)	0	1
1	Tobias Svantesson (SWE)	0	1
1	Stefan Svensson (SWE)	0	1
1	Byron Talbot (RSA)	0	1
1	Ben Testerman (USA)	0	1
1	Jon Treml (USA)	0	1
1	Des Tyson (AUS)	0	1
1	Marián Vajda (TCH)	0	1
1	Huub van Boeckel (NED)	0	1
1	Srinivasan Vasudevan (IND)	0	1
1	Lars-Anders Wahlgren (SWE)	0	1
1	Todd Woodbridge (AUS)	0	1
1	Mark Woodforde (AUS)	0	1

=== Titles won by nation ===
Total	Nation	S	D
30	United States (USA)	10	20
15	Sweden (SWE)	6	9
11	West Germany (FRG)	8	3
9	Canada (CAN)	5	4
8	Australia (AUS)	5	3
8	Czechoslovakia (TCH)	3	5
8	South Africa (RSA)	2	6
6	Italy (ITA)	3	3
5	Brazil (BRA)	2	3
5	France (FRA)	2	3
5	Great Britain (GBR)	0	5
4	Peru (PER)	2	2
3	Israel (ISR)	2	1
3	Mexico (MEX)	2	1
3	Spain (ESP)	2	1
2	Argentina (ARG)	1	1
2	Bahamas (BHS)	1	1
2	Chile (CHI)	1	1
2	India (IND)	1	1
2	Uruguay (URU)	1	1
2	Netherlands (NED)	0	2
2	New Zealand (NZL)	0	2
2	Nigeria (NGR)	0	2
1	Haiti (HAI)	1	0
1	Yugoslavia (YUG)	1	0
1	Denmark (DEN)	0	1
1	Finland (FIN)	0	1
1	Iran (IRN)	0	1
1	Luxembourg (LUX)	0	1
1	Paraguay (PAR)	0	1
1	Romania (ROU)	0	1
1	Senegal (SEN)	0	1
1	Switzerland (SUI)	0	1

== See also ==
- 1987 Grand Prix
- Association of Tennis Professionals
- International Tennis Federation
