= 1986 Wimbledon Championships – Boys' doubles =

Boys' doubles
- 1986 Wimbledon Championships

Final
- Champions: (Spain) Tomás Carbonell (Czechoslovakia) Petr Korda
- Runners-up: (Australia) Shane Barr (Canada) Hubert Karrasch
- Score: 6–1, 6–1

Events
Singles	men	women		boys	girls
Doubles	men	women	mixed	boys	girls
WC Singles	men	women	quad
WC Doubles	men	women	quad
Legends	men	women	seniors
← 1985 ·	Wimbledon Championships	· 1987 →

Tomás Carbonell and Petr Korda defeated Shane Barr and Hubert Karrasch in the final, 6–1, 6–1 to win the boys' doubles tennis title at the 1986 Wimbledon Championships.

== Seeds ==
1. (Italy) Omar Camporese / (Italy) Eugenio Rossi (quarterfinals)
2. (Portugal) Nuno Marques / (Venezuela) Nicolás Pereira (second round)
3. (United Kingdom) Chris Bailey / (United Kingdom) Austen Brice (first round)
4. (Spain) Florentino Anda / (Spain) Javier Sánchez (quarterfinals)
5. (Netherlands) Glen Schaap / (Netherlands) Jacco Van Duyn (second round)
6. (Sweden) Tomas Nydahl / (Sweden) Patrik Wennberg (first round)
7. (Chile) Sergio Cortés / (Argentina) Alberto Mancini (first round)
8. (Zimbabwe) Byron Black / (Brazil) Marcelo Saliola (first round)

== Draw ==
=== Key ===
- Q = Qualifier
- WC = Wild card
- LL = Lucky loser
- Alt = Alternate
- ITF = ITF entry
- PR = Protected ranking
- SR = Special ranking
- SE = Special exempt
- JE = Junior exempt
- JR = Junior Accelerator Programme entrant
- CO = College Accelerator Programme entrant
- NG = Next Gen Accelerator Program entrant
- w/o = Walkover
- r = Retired
- d = Defaulted

=== Finals ===
Semifinals
(Spain) Tomás Carbonell (Czechoslovakia) Petr Korda	6	7
(Brazil) Rodrigo Barnabe (Brazil) Ricardo Camargo	3	5
(Australia) Shane Barr (Canada) Hubert Karrasch	6	5	11
(France) Arnaud Boetsch (France) Stéphane Grenier	2	7	9

Final
(Spain) Tomás Carbonell (Czechoslovakia) Petr Korda	6	6
(Australia) Shane Barr (Canada) Hubert Karrasch	1	1

=== Top half ===
First round
1	(Italy) Omar Camporese (Italy) Eugenio Rossi	6	6	6
(United Kingdom) Anthony Hunting (United Kingdom) Darren Kirk	2	7	3
(Mexico) Roberto López (Mexico) Geraldo Martínez	6	7
(Bangladesh) Shovon Jamaly (Sri Lanka) Neil Rajapakse	3	6
(Spain) Tomás Carbonell (Czechoslovakia) Petr Korda	4	6	6
(Mexico) Alain Lemaitre (Mexico) Eduardo Vélez	6	4	4
(Hong Kong) Christopher Lai (Belgium) Christophe Vandeweghe	2	3
5	(Netherlands) Glen Schaap (Netherlands) Jacco Van Duyn	6	6
3	(United Kingdom) Chris Bailey (United Kingdom) Austen Brice	7	3	12
(Brazil) Rodrigo Barnabe (Brazil) Ricardo Camargo	6	6	14
(South Africa) Jacob Makkink (South Africa) Stefan van Schalkwyk	4	6
(Chile) Cristián Araya (Chile) Rubén Gajardo	6	7
(United Kingdom) Colin Beecher (United Kingdom) Jake Martyn	6	6	6
(Philippines) Joseph Lizardo (Indonesia) Marco Sitepu	7	4	3
(West Germany) Rüdiger Haas (West Germany) Christian Weis	6	6
8	(Zimbabwe) Byron Black (Brazil) Marcelo Saliola	3	3

Second round
1	(Italy) O Camporese (Italy) E Rossi	6	6
(Mexico) R López (Mexico) G Martínez	4	4
(Spain) T Carbonell (Czechoslovakia) P Korda	6	6
5	(Netherlands) G Schaap (Netherlands) J Van Duyn	1	2
(Brazil) R Barnabe (Brazil) R Camargo
(Chile) C Araya (Chile) R Gajardo	w/o
(United Kingdom) C Beecher (United Kingdom) J Martyn	3	3
(West Germany) R Haas (West Germany) C Weis	6	6

Quarterfinals
1	(Italy) O Camporese (Italy) E Rossi	7	3	4
(Spain) T Carbonell (Czechoslovakia) P Korda	5	6	6
(Brazil) R Barnabe (Brazil) R Camargo	6	3	6
(West Germany) R Haas (West Germany) C Weis	2	6	3

Semifinals
(Spain) T Carbonell (Czechoslovakia) P Korda	6	7
(Brazil) R Barnabe (Brazil) R Camargo	3	5

=== Bottom half ===
First round
7	(Chile) Sergio Cortés (Argentina) Alberto Mancini	4	7	2
(Australia) Shane Barr (Canada) Hubert Karrasch	6	6	6
(India) Hari Aiyar (Poland) Krzysztof Ganszczyk	3	4
(Peru) Alejandro Aramburú (United States) Francisco Montana	6	6
(United Kingdom) Laurence Matthews (United Kingdom) Danny Sapsford	4	3
(Soviet Union) Andrei Cherkasov (Japan) Ryuso Tsujino	6	6
(United Kingdom) David Roberts (United Kingdom) Alex Rouse	7	3	3
4	(Spain) Florentino Anda (Spain) Javier Sánchez	6	6	6
6	(Sweden) Tomas Nydahl (Sweden) Patrik Wennberg	1	7	4
(France) Arnaud Boetsch (France) Stéphane Grenier	6	6	6
(Finland) Janne Holtari (Sweden) Nicklas Utgren	6	6	7
(Brazil) Marcos Barbosa (Ecuador) Ernesto Lingen	2	7	5
(Australia) Patrick Flynn (New Zealand) Brett Steven	2	6	7
(India) Zeeshan Ali (India) Zubin Irani	6	2	5
(Israel) Boaz Merenstein (Israel) Raviv Weidenfeld	w/o
2	(Portugal) Nuno Marques (Venezuela) Nicolás Pereira

Second round
(Australia) S Barr (Canada) H Karrasch	6	6
(Peru) A Aramburu (United States) F Montana	3	3
(Soviet Union) A Cherkasov (Japan) R Tsujino	6^{1}	3
4	(Spain) F Anda (Spain) J Sánchez	7^{7}	6
(France) A Boetsch (France) S Grenier	6	6
(Finland) J Holtari (Sweden) N Utgren	4	4
(Australia) P Flynn (New Zealand) B Steven	6	6
(Portugal) N Marques (Venezuela) N Pereira	3	3

Quarterfinals
(Australia) S Barr (Canada) H Karrasch	6	6
4	(Spain) F Anda (Spain) J Sánchez	4	3
(France) A Boetsch (France) S Grenier	7^{8}	7^{7}
(Australia) P Flynn (New Zealand) B Steven	6^{6}	6^{5}

Semifinals
(Australia) S Barr (Canada) H Karrasch	6	5	11
(France) A Boetsch (France) S Grenier	2	7	9
