= 1986 Wimbledon Championships – Boys' singles =

Boys' singles
- 1986 Wimbledon Championships

Final
- Champion: (Mexico) Eduardo Vélez
- Runner-up: (Spain) Javier Sánchez
- Score: 6–3, 7–5

Events
Singles	men	women		boys	girls
Doubles	men	women	mixed	boys	girls
WC Singles	men	women	quad
WC Doubles	men	women	quad
Legends	men	women	seniors
- Wimbledon Championships

Eduardo Vélez defeated Javier Sánchez in the final, 6–3, 7–5 to win the boys' singles tennis title at the 1986 Wimbledon Championships.

== Seeds ==
1. n/a
2. (West Germany) Christian Weis (third round)
3. (Spain) Javier Sánchez (final)
4. (Mexico) Eduardo Vélez (champion)
5. (Australia) Shane Barr (third round)
6. (India) Zeeshan Ali (semifinals)
7. (Argentina) Alberto Mancini (third round)
8. (Portugal) Nuno Marques (quarterfinals)
9. n/a
10. (Australia) Patrick Flynn (first round)
11. n/a
12. (Spain) Tomás Carbonell (semifinals)
13. (Mexico) Alain Lemaitre (second round)
14. (France) Stéphane Grenier (first round)
15. (Italy) Eugenio Rossi (third round)
16. n/a

Click on the seed number of a player to go to their draw section.

== Draw ==
Key

- Q = Qualifier
- WC = Wild card
- LL = Lucky loser
- Alt = Alternate
- ITF = ITF entry
- PR = Protected ranking
- SR = Special ranking
- SE = Special exempt
- JE = Junior exempt
- JR = Junior Accelerator Programme entrant
- CO = College Accelerator Programme entrant
- NG = Next Gen Accelerator Program entrant
- w/o = Walkover
- r = Retired
- d = Defaulted

=== Finals ===
Quarterfinals
(United States) Francisco Montana	4	6
6	(India) Zeeshan Ali	6	7
4	(Mexico) Eduardo Vélez	6	6
(United Kingdom) Chris Bailey	2	3
8	(Portugal) Nuno Marques	6	4
3	(Spain) Javier Sánchez	7	6
(Czechoslovakia) Petr Korda	4	5
12	(Spain) Tomás Carbonell	6	7

Semifinals
6	(India) Zeeshan Ali	2	6	2
4	(Mexico) Eduardo Vélez	6	4	6
3	(Spain) Javier Sánchez	7	7
12	(Spain) Tomás Carbonell	5	6

Final
4	(Mexico) Eduardo Vélez	6	7
3	(Spain) Javier Sánchez	3	5

=== Top half ===
==== Section 1 ====
First round
(Mexico) Roberto López	6	6
(Switzerland) Jean-Yves Blondel	4	3
(West Germany) Rüdiger Haas	6	4	7
(Brazil) Marcos Barbosa	1	6	5
(United Kingdom) Alex Rouse	6	5
(United States) Francisco Montana	7	7
(Indonesia) Marco Sitepu	6	3	4
13	(Mexico) Alain Lemaitre	3	6	6
(India) Raza Mirza	6	6
(Bangladesh) Shovon Jamaly	1	3
(Sri Lanka) Sudantha Soysa	1	0
(Chile) Sergio Cortés	6	6
(India) Hari Aiyar	5	6
(Soviet Union) Andrei Cherkasov	7	7
(Philippines) Joseph Lizardo	3	2
6	(India) Zeeshan Ali	6	6

Second round
(Mexico) R López	6	6	6
(West Germany) R Haas	1	7	3
(United States) F Montana	6	6
13	(Mexico) A Lemaitre	3	4
(India) R Mirza	6	4	4
(Chile) S Cortés	4	6	6
(Soviet Union) A Cherkasov	3	2
6	(India) Z Ali	6	6

Third round
(Mexico) R López	3	2
(United States) F Montana	6	6
(Chile) S Cortés	6	1	6
6	(India) Z Ali	4	6	8

Quarterfinals
(United States) F Montana	4	6
6	(India) Z Ali	6	7

==== Section 2 ====
First round
4	(Mexico) Eduardo Vélez	6	6
(Finland) Janne Holtari	2	4
(United Kingdom) Austen Brice	6	6	6
(Canada) Hubert Karrasch	2	7	4
(Norway) Anders Håseth	7	3	1
(Netherlands) Glen Schaap	6	6	6
(Brazil) Ricardo Camargo	3	1
15	(Italy) Eugenio Rossi	6	6
(Sweden) Tomas Nydahl	6	3	4
(United Kingdom) Chris Bailey	4	6	6
(Venezuela) Nicolás Pereira	6	7
(India) Zubin Irani	2	5
(Sri Lanka) Neil Rajapakse	5	0
(Hong Kong) Christopher Lai	7	6
(Chile) Cristián Araya	3	3
5	(Australia) Shane Barr	6	6

Second round
4	(Mexico) E Vélez	6	6
(United Kingdom) A Brice	0	3
(Netherlands) G Schaap	5	3
15	(Italy) E Rossi	7	6
(United Kingdom) C Bailey	6	6	6
(Venezuela) N Pereira	7	4	2
(Hong Kong) C Lai	3	2
5	(Australia) S Barr	6	6

Third round
4	(Mexico) E Vélez	6	6
15	(Italy) E Rossi	4	2
(United Kingdom) C Bailey	3	7	6
5	(Australia) S Barr	6	6	4

Quarterfinals
4	(Mexico) E Vélez	6	6
(United Kingdom) C Bailey	2	3

=== Bottom half ===
==== Section 3 ====
First round
8	(Portugal) Nuno Marques	6	7
(Zimbabwe) Byron Black	2	6
(Brazil) Rodrigo Barnabe	6	6
(Sweden) Nicklas Utgren	3	4
(Sweden) Patrik Wennberg	6	6
(United Kingdom) Danny Sapsford	3	3
(Switzerland) Rolf Hertzog	7	6
14	(France) Stéphane Grenier	5	3
(Chile) José Tort	3	1
(Spain) Florentino Anda	6	6
(Israel) Raviv Weidenfeld	6	2	6
(United Kingdom) Anthony Hunting	3	6	3
(New Zealand) Brett Steven	6	6
(South Africa) Stefan van Schalkwyk	2	1
(United Kingdom) David Roberts	3	6
3	(Spain) Javier Sánchez	6	7

Second round
8	(Portugal) N Marques	6	6	6
(Brazil) R Barnabe	4	7	1
(Sweden) P Wennberg	7	3	6
(Switzerland) R Hertzog	5	6	8
(Spain) F Anda	7	4	3
(Israel) R Weidenfeld	6	6	6
(New Zealand) B Steven	3	2
3	(Spain) J Sánchez	6	6

Third round
8	(Portugal) N Marques	6	6
(Switzerland) R Hertzog	4	4
(Israel) R Weidenfeld	3	2
3	(Spain) J Sánchez	6	6

Quarterfinals
8	(Portugal) N Marques	6	4
3	(Spain) J Sánchez	7	6

==== Section 4 ====
First round
7	(Argentina) Alberto Mancini	6	6
(Belgium) Christophe Vandeweghe	4	2
(Netherlands) Jacco Van Duyn	6	6
(Chile) Rubén Gajardo	2	3
(Czechoslovakia) Petr Korda	6	6
(United Kingdom) Laurence Matthews	1	1
(Italy) Omar Camporese	6	6
(Australia) Patrick Flynn	4	3
12	(Spain) Tomás Carbonell	6	6
(Poland) Krzysztof Ganszczyk	2	2
(Brazil) Marcelo Saliola	2	4
(Israel) Boaz Merenstein	6	6
(Peru) Alejandro Aramburú	3	0
(France) Arnaud Boetsch	6	6
(Japan) Ryuso Tsujino	2	4
2	(West Germany) Christian Weis	6	6

Second round
7	(Argentina) A Mancini	6	6
(Netherlands) J Van Duyn	2	4
(Czechoslovakia) P Korda	4	6	6
(Italy) O Camporese	6	3	3
12	(Spain) T Carbonell	7	5	6
(Israel) B Merenstein	6	7	4
(France) A Boetsch	7	6	6
2	(West Germany) C Weis	5	7	8

Third round
7	(Argentina) A Mancini	0	2
(Czechoslovakia) P Korda	6	6
12	(Spain) T Carbonell	7	3	6
(West Germany) C Weis	5	6	1

Quarterfinals
(Czechoslovakia) P Korda	4	5
12	(Spain) T Carbonell	6	7
