= Roberto López =

Roberto López may refer to:

- Roberto López (musician), Colombian-Canadian composer, musician and producer
- Roberto López (rower) (born 1993), Salvadoran rower
- Roberto López (tennis) (born 1968), Mexican tennis player
- Roberto López (footballer, born 2000) (Roberto López Alcaide), Spanish footballer
- Roberto López (artist) (born 1974), aka ROLOCO, Spanish visual artist and composer
- Rúper (Roberto López Esquiroz, born 1987), Spanish footballer
- Roberto López González (born 1958), Mexican politician representing Jalisco for the PRD
- Roberto López Román, Puerto Rico politician
- Roberto López Rosado (born 1961), Mexican politician representing Oaxaca for the PRD
- Roberto López Suárez (born 1972), Mexican politician representing Zacatecas for the PRD
- Roberto López Ufarte (born 1958), Spanish footballer
- Christian Roberto López (born 1987), Mexican footballer

== See also ==
- Robert Lopez (disambiguation)
- Roberto Lopes (disambiguation)
