= Eduardo Vélez =

Eduardo Vélez may refer to:

- Eduardo Vélez (archer) (born 1986), Mexican Olympic archer
- Eduardo Vélez (tennis) (born 1969), Mexican tennis player
