= 1988 CA-TennisTrophy – Doubles =

Doubles
- 1988 CA-TennisTrophy

Final
- Champions: (Austria) Alex Antonitsch (Hungary) Balázs Taróczy
- Runners-up: (United States) Kevin Curren (Czechoslovakia) Tomáš Šmíd
- Score: 4–6, 6–3, 7–6

Details
- Draw: 16
- Seeds: 4

Events
Singles	Doubles
- Vienna Open

Mel Purcell and Tim Wilkison were the defending champions but did not compete that year.

Alex Antonitsch and Balázs Taróczy won in the final 4–6, 6–3, 7–6 against Kevin Curren and Tomáš Šmíd.

== Seeds ==
1. (United States) Kevin Curren / (Czechoslovakia) Tomáš Šmíd (final)
2. (Sweden) Joakim Nyström / (Italy) Claudio Panatta (first round)
3. (Spain) Sergio Casal / (Spain) Javier Sánchez (first round)
4. (Sweden) Niclas Kroon / (Sweden) Peter Lundgren (first round)

== Draw ==
Key

- Q = Qualifier
- WC = Wild card
- LL = Lucky loser
- Alt = Alternate
- ITF = ITF entry
- PR = Protected ranking
- SR = Special ranking
- SE = Special exempt
- JE = Junior exempt
- JR = Junior Accelerator Programme entrant
- CO = College Accelerator Programme entrant
- NG = Next Gen Accelerator Program entrant
- w/o = Walkover
- r = Retired
- d = Defaulted

First round
1	(United States) K Curren (Czechoslovakia) T Šmíd	6	6
(Austria) S Krapf (Austria) R Wawra	2	2
(Senegal) Y Doumbia (Soviet Union) A Võsand	4	3
(Austria) H Skoff (Czechoslovakia) M Vajda	6	6
3	(Spain) S Casal (Spain) J Sánchez	4	5
(Czechoslovakia) S Birner (Czechoslovakia) K Nováček	6	7
(Canada) M Laurendeau (United States) R Reneberg	6	6
(Sweden) J Gunnarsson (Sweden) M Gustafsson	2	4
(The Bahamas) R Smith (Kenya) P Wekesa	6	6	6
(Austria) M Oberleitner (Czechoslovakia) B Stanković	3	7	3
(Austria) A Antonitsch (Hungary) B Taróczy	6	7
4	(Sweden) N Kroon (Sweden) P Lundgren	1	5
(Spain) J Clavet (Spain) F Clavet	6	6
(Sweden) C Bergström (Sweden) L Jönsson	1	4
(Czechoslovakia) P Korda (Czechoslovakia) J Navrátil	6	2	6
2	(Sweden) J Nyström (Italy) C Panatta	3	6	4

Quarterfinals
1	(United States) K Curren (Czechoslovakia) T Šmíd	6	6
(Austria) H Skoff (Czechoslovakia) M Vajda	1	4
(Czechoslovakia) S Birner (Czechoslovakia) K Nováček	6	7
(Canada) M Laurendeau (United States) R Reneberg	4	5
(The Bahamas) R Smith (Kenya) P Wekesa	3	4
(Austria) A Antonitsch (Hungary) B Taróczy	6	6
(Spain) J Clavet (Spain) F Clavet	3	6	4
(Czechoslovakia) P Korda (Czechoslovakia) J Navrátil	6	4	6

Semifinals
1	(United States) K Curren (Czechoslovakia) T Šmíd	7	6
(Czechoslovakia) S Birner (Czechoslovakia) K Nováček	5	4
(Austria) A Antonitsch (Hungary) B Taróczy	7	7
(Czechoslovakia) P Korda (Czechoslovakia) J Navrátil	6	6

Final
1	(United States) K Curren (Czechoslovakia) T Šmíd	6	3	6
(Austria) A Antonitsch (Hungary) B Taróczy	4	6	7
