= Rubén Gajardo =

Rubén Gajardo may refer to:

- Rubén Gajardo (tennis)
- Rubén Gajardo (politician)
