= 1988 CA-TennisTrophy – Singles =

Singles
- 1988 CA-TennisTrophy

Final
- Champion: (Austria) Horst Skoff
- Runner-up: (Austria) Thomas Muster
- Score: 4–6, 6–3, 6–4, 6–2

Details
- Draw: 32
- Seeds: 8

Events
Singles	Doubles
← 1987 ·	Vienna Open	· 1989 →

Jonas Svensson was the defending champion but lost in the quarterfinals to Horst Skoff.

Skoff won in the final 4–6, 6–3, 6–4, 6–2 against Thomas Muster.

== Seeds ==
1. (Austria) Thomas Muster (final)
2. (Sweden) Jonas Svensson (quarterfinals)
3. (Soviet Union) Andrei Chesnokov (semifinals)
4. (United States) Kevin Curren (semifinals)
5. (Sweden) Magnus Gustafsson (second round)
6. (Netherlands) Michiel Schapers (quarterfinals)
7. (Spain) Sergio Casal (semifinals)
8. (Czechoslovakia) Marián Vajda (quarterfinals)

== Draw ==
=== Key ===
- Q = Qualifier
- WC = Wild card
- LL = Lucky loser
- Alt = Alternate
- SE = Special exempt
- PR = Protected ranking
- ITF = ITF entry
- JE = Junior exempt
- w/o = Walkover
- r = Retired
- d = Defaulted
- SR = Special ranking

=== Final ===
Semifinals
1	(Austria) Thomas Muster	6	6
4	(United States) Kevin Curren	4	4
3	(Soviet Union) Andrei Chesnokov	5	4
(Austria) Horst Skoff	7	6

Final
1	(Austria) Thomas Muster	6	3	4	2
(Austria) Horst Skoff	4	6	6	6

=== Section 1 ===
First round
1	(Austria) T Muster	6	1	6
(Canada) M Laurendeau	4	6	3
WC	(Austria) A Antonitsch	6	3	6
(Sweden) J Gunnarsson	2	6	1
(Italy) M Narducci	3	1
Q	(Italy) C Panatta	6	6
(Kenya) P Wekesa	1	4
8	(Czechoslovakia) M Vajda	6	6
4	(United States) K Curren	7	6
(Czechoslovakia) P Korda	6	4
(The Bahamas) R Smith	6	6
WC	(Austria) M Oberleitner	3	4
(Sweden) P Lundgren	6	6
(Spain) J Sánchez	3	3
Q	(United States) P Palandjian	0	0
6	(Netherlands) M Schapers	6	6

Second round
1	(Austria) T Muster	6	7
WC	(Austria) A Antonitsch	3	6
Q	(Italy) C Panatta	3	6	2
8	(Czechoslovakia) M Vajda	6	1	6
4	(United States) K Curren	6	3	6
(The Bahamas) R Smith	4	6	4
(Sweden) P Lundgren	4	6
6	(Netherlands) M Schapers	6	7

Quarterfinals
1	(Austria) T Muster	7	6
8	(Czechoslovakia) M Vajda	6	2
4	(United States) K Curren	6	6
6	(Netherlands) M Schapers	2	2

Semifinals
1	(Austria) T Muster	6	6
4	(United States) K Curren	4	4

=== Section 2 ===
First round
5	(Sweden) M Gustafsson	3	7	6
Q	(Sweden) L Jonsson	6	5	4
(Brazil) F Roese	1	0
(United States) R Reneberg	6	6
(Sweden) N Kroon	5	7	2
(Soviet Union) A Võsand	7	5	6
(Senegal) Y Doumbia	5	4
3	(Soviet Union) A Chesnokov	7	6
7	(Spain) S Casal	6	6
WC	(Czechoslovakia) T Šmíd	4	4
(Sweden) J Nyström	1	6
(Austria) H Skoff	6	7
Q	(Socialist Federal Republic of Yugoslavia) G Prpić	4	6
(Sweden) C Bergström	6	7
(United States) J Grabb	2	4
2	(Sweden) J Svensson	6	6

Second round
5	(Sweden) M Gustafsson	5	3
(United States) R Reneberg	7	6
(Soviet Union) A Võsand	6	1
3	(Soviet Union) A Chesnokov	7	6
7	(Spain) S Casal	7	4	4
(Austria) H Skoff	5	6	6
(Sweden) C Bergström
2	(Sweden) J Svensson	w/o

Quarterfinals
(United States) R Reneberg	2	6	3
3	(Soviet Union) A Chesnokov	6	2	6
(Austria) H Skoff	6	6
2	(Sweden) J Svensson	4	3

Semifinals
3	(Soviet Union) A Chesnokov	5	4
(Austria) H Skoff	7	6
