= Anders Henricsson =

Swedish tennis player

- Country (sports): Sweden
- Born: 29 April 1965 (age 60)
- Plays: Right-handed
- Prize money: $3,747

Singles
- Career record: 0–1
- Career titles: 0
- Highest ranking: No. 405 (9 July 1984)

Doubles
- Career record: 0–1
- Career titles: 0; 1 Challenger
- Highest ranking: No. 289 (12 October 1987)

Anders Henricsson (born 29 April 1965) is a former tennis player from Sweden.

== Tennis career ==
Henricsson competed on the professional tour in the 1980s and is the older brother of former touring professional, Per Henricsson.

Henricsson featured once in each of a singles - and a doubles draw, of a Grand Prix tournament. In 1983, as a qualifier he lost in the first round of the Stockholm Open to Mark Dickson. As a doubles player in partnership with, Peter Lindgren, they lost in the first round of the 1988 Swedish Open against Nicklas Kulti and Magnus Larsson. The previous year, 1987, partnering his brother, he won the doubles title at the Knokke Challenger tournament. The brothers also reached the semi-finals at the Montabaur Challenger in 1988.

Henricsson is a qualified sports psychologist and a professional tennis coach, that coached the former professional player Andreas Vinciguerra from 1998 to 2003.

== Challenger titles ==
=== Doubles: (1) ===
| No. | Date | Tournament | Surface | Partner | Opponents | Score |
|---|---|---|---|---|---|---|
| 1. | Aug 1987 | Knokke, Belgium | Clay | (Sweden) Per Henricsson | (Italy) Nevio Devide (Brazil) Givaldo Barbosa | 6–1, 6–3 |
