= Robert Lopez (disambiguation) =

Robert Lopez (born 1975) is an American songwriter of musicals.

Robert Lopez may also refer to:

- Robert Lopez (writer) (born 1971), American fiction writer
- El Vez, stage name of Robert Lopez (born 1960), Mexican-American singer-songwriter and musician
- Robert F. Lopez (1859–1936), United States Navy officer
- Robert Oscar Lopez (born 1971), professor of humanities at Southwestern Baptist Theological Seminary
- Robert S. Lopez (1910–1986), American economic historian
- Robert Lopez Mendy (born 1987), Senegalese footballer

== See also ==
- Roberto López (disambiguation)
- Roberto Lopes (disambiguation)
