= 1988 CA-TennisTrophy =

- Date: 17–23 October
- Edition: 14th
- Category: Grand Prix
- Draw: 32S / 16D
- Prize money: $140,000
- Surface: Carpet / indoor
- Location: Vienna, Austria
- Venue: Wiener Stadthalle

Champions

Singles
- (Austria) Horst Skoff

Doubles
- (Austria) Alex Antonitsch / (Hungary) Balázs Taróczy
- Vienna Open

The 1988 CA-TennisTrophy was a men's tennis tournament played on indoor carpet courts at the Wiener Stadthalle in Vienna, Austria that was part of the 1988 Nabisco Grand Prix. It was the 14th edition of the tournament and ran from 17 October through 23 October 1988. Unseeded Horst Skoff won the singles title.

== Finals ==
=== Singles ===
(Austria) Horst Skoff defeated (Austria) Thomas Muster 4–6, 6–3, 6–4, 6–2

- It was Skoff's 2nd title of the year and the 3rd of his career.

=== Doubles ===
(Austria) Alex Antonitsch / (Hungary) Balázs Taróczy defeated (United States) Kevin Curren / (Czechoslovakia) Tomáš Šmíd 4–6, 6–3, 7–6

- It was Antonitsch's only title of the year and the 2nd of his career. It was Taróczy's only title of the year and the 38th of his career.
