= Alberto Paris =

Italian tennis player

- Country (sports): Italy; Luxembourg
- Born: 5 April 1965 (age 61) Brescia, Italy
- Prize money: $15,329

Singles
- Career record: 0–1 (ATP Tour)
- Highest ranking: No. 207 (17 August 1987)

Grand Slam singles results
- Wimbledon: Q1 (1986, 1988, 1989)

Doubles
- Career record: 0–2 (ATP Tour)
- Career titles: 1 (ATP Challenger)
- Highest ranking: No. 159 (14 September 1987)

Alberto Paris (born 5 April 1965) is an Italian former professional tennis player.

== Biography ==
Born in Brescia, Alberto Paris toured professionally in the 1980s and reached a best singles ranking of 207 in the world.

Paris featured on three occasions in the qualifiers for Wimbledon and made his only Grand Prix main draw appearance at the 1987 Tel Aviv Open, where he was beaten in the first round by Jimmy Connors.

As a doubles player on the professional tour he had a top ranking of 159 and won a Challenger tournament in Istanbul in 1987.

Paris was based during his career in Luxembourg and while coaching there in the 1990s appeared in 10 Davis Cup ties for the country. His best format in Davis Cup was doubles, earning a 7/2 record when he teamed up with regular partner Johnny Goudenbour.

== Challenger titles ==
=== Doubles: (1) ===
Year	Tournament	Surface	Partner	Opponents	Score
1987	Istanbul, Turkey	Clay	(Italy) Nevio Devide	(Romania) Adrian Marcu (Romania) Florin Segărceanu	7–5, 6–2
