= Mark Basham =

American tennis player

- Full name: Mark Basham
- Country (sports): United States
- Born: April 24, 1962 (age 62); Santa Barbara, California
- Height: 5 ft 9 in (175 cm)
- Plays: Left-handed
- Prize money: $23,813

Singles
- Career record: 0–3
- Career titles: 0
- Highest ranking: No. 292 (April 6, 1987)

Doubles
- Career record: 7–11
- Career titles: 0
- Highest ranking: No. 103 (October 10, 1988)

Grand Slam doubles results
- French Open: 1R (1987)
- Wimbledon: 1R (1988)
- US Open: 1R (1988)

Mark Basham (born April 24, 1962) is a former professional tennis player from the United States.

== Biography ==
Basham, a left-handed player, was born in Santa Barbara, California. He is the grandson of Arnold Jones, who represented the United States at the 1928 International Lawn Tennis Challenge, now known as the Davis Cup.

A graduate of Santa Barbara High School, Basham played collegiate tennis at UCLA in the early 1980s. He won the United States Amateur Championships in 1981, with a win over Rick Leach in the final. In both 1982 and 1984 he was a member of UCLA's NCAA Championships winning teams. He was a singles and doubles All-American in the 1984 season. In 1986 he graduated with a degree in sociology.

From 1986 to 1988 he competed on the professional circuit, mostly as a doubles specialist. His singles main draw appearances on the Grand Prix tour all came in 1988, at Key Biscayne, Schenectady and Indianapolis. As a doubles player he made all of his Grand Prix appearances partnering Charles Beckman, with their best performance coming at the 1988 OTB Open in Schenectady, where they made the semi-finals. He made it to 103 in the world in doubles, with appearances at the French Open, Wimbledon and US Open, as well as two Challenger titles.

He has been the Director of the Santa Barbara Tennis Club since 1996.

== Challenger titles ==
=== Doubles: (2) ===
No.	Year	Tournament	Surface	Partner	Opponents	Score
1.	1987	Parioli, Italy	Clay	(United States) Brett Buffington	(Italy) Massimo Cierro (Italy) Alessandro de Minicis	4–6, 6–2, 6–1
2.	1988	Vienna, Austria	Carpet	(United States) Charles Beckman	(Austria) Thomas Muster (Austria) Michael Oberleitner	6–3, 3–6, 6–3
