= List of Romania Davis Cup team representatives =

This is a list of tennis players who have represented the Romania Davis Cup team in an official Davis Cup match. Romania have taken part in the competition since 1922.

== Players ==
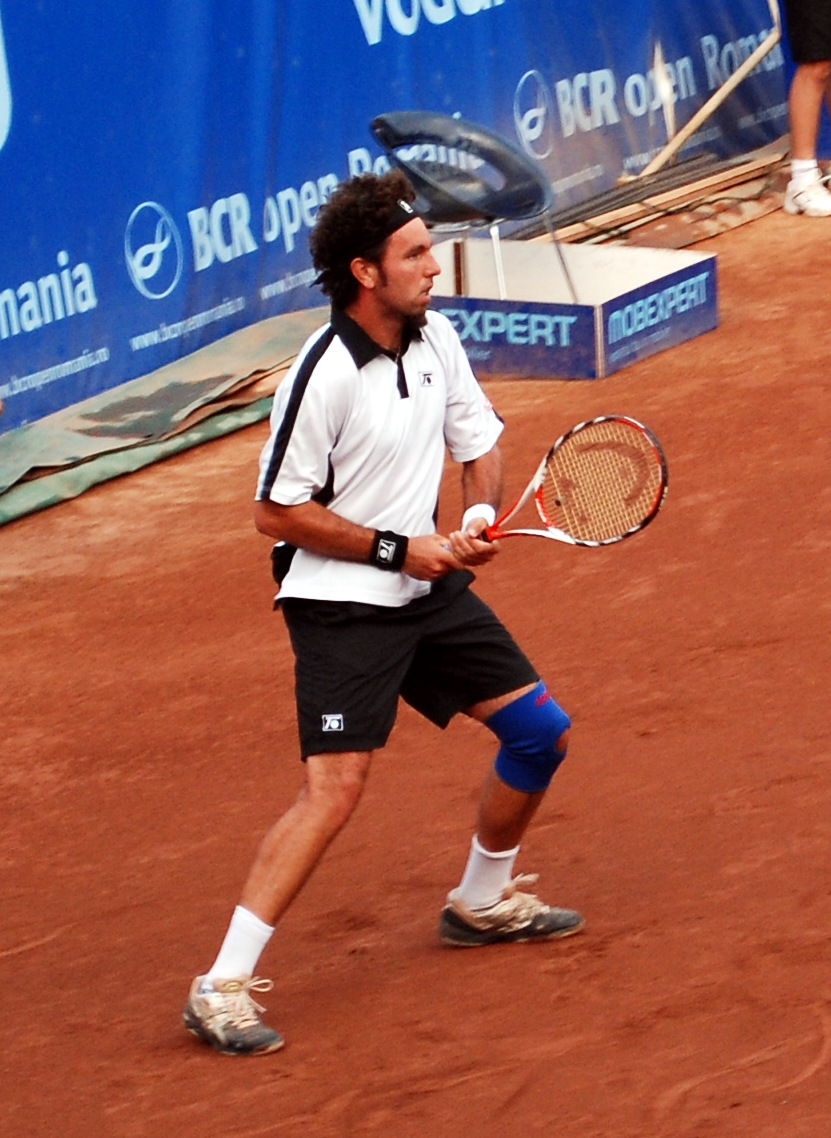
Adrian Cruciat

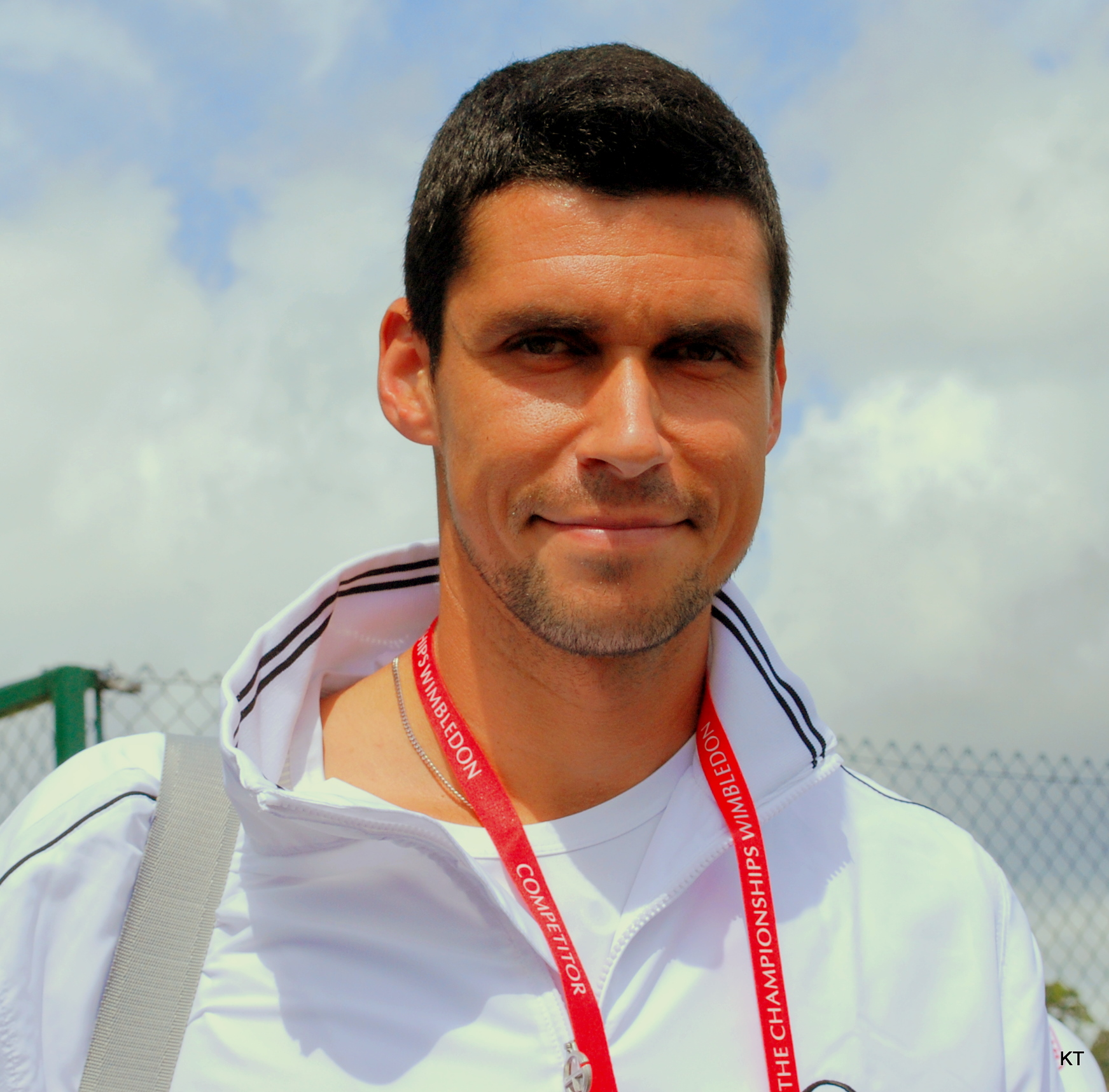
Victor Hănescu

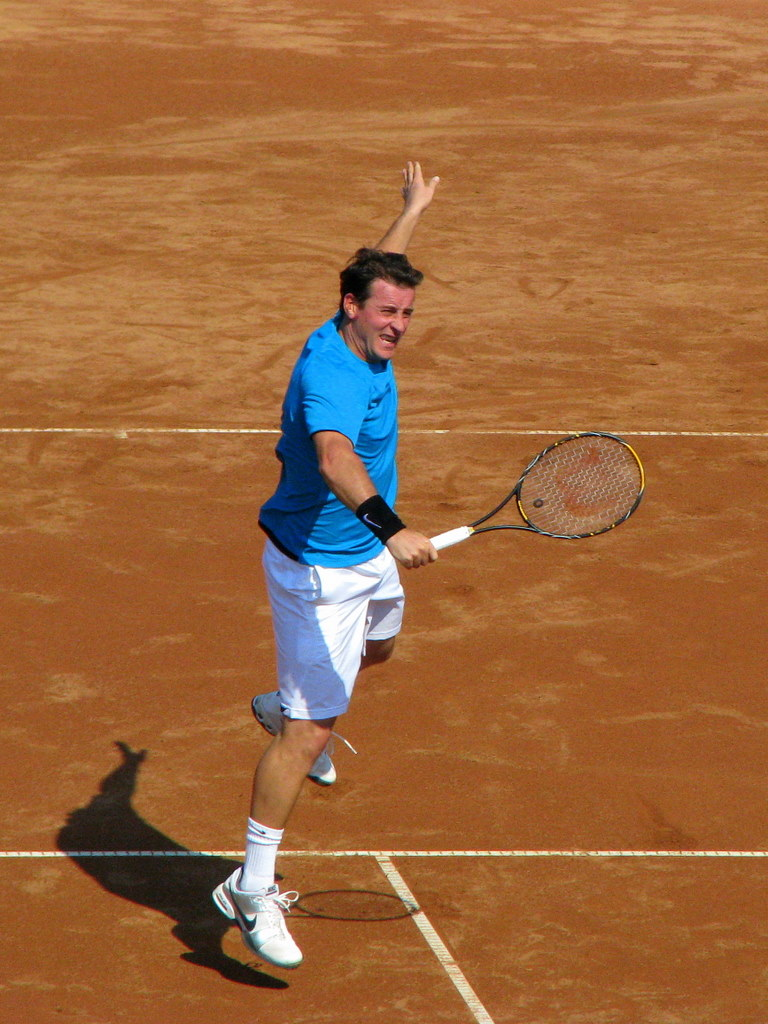
Andrei Pavel

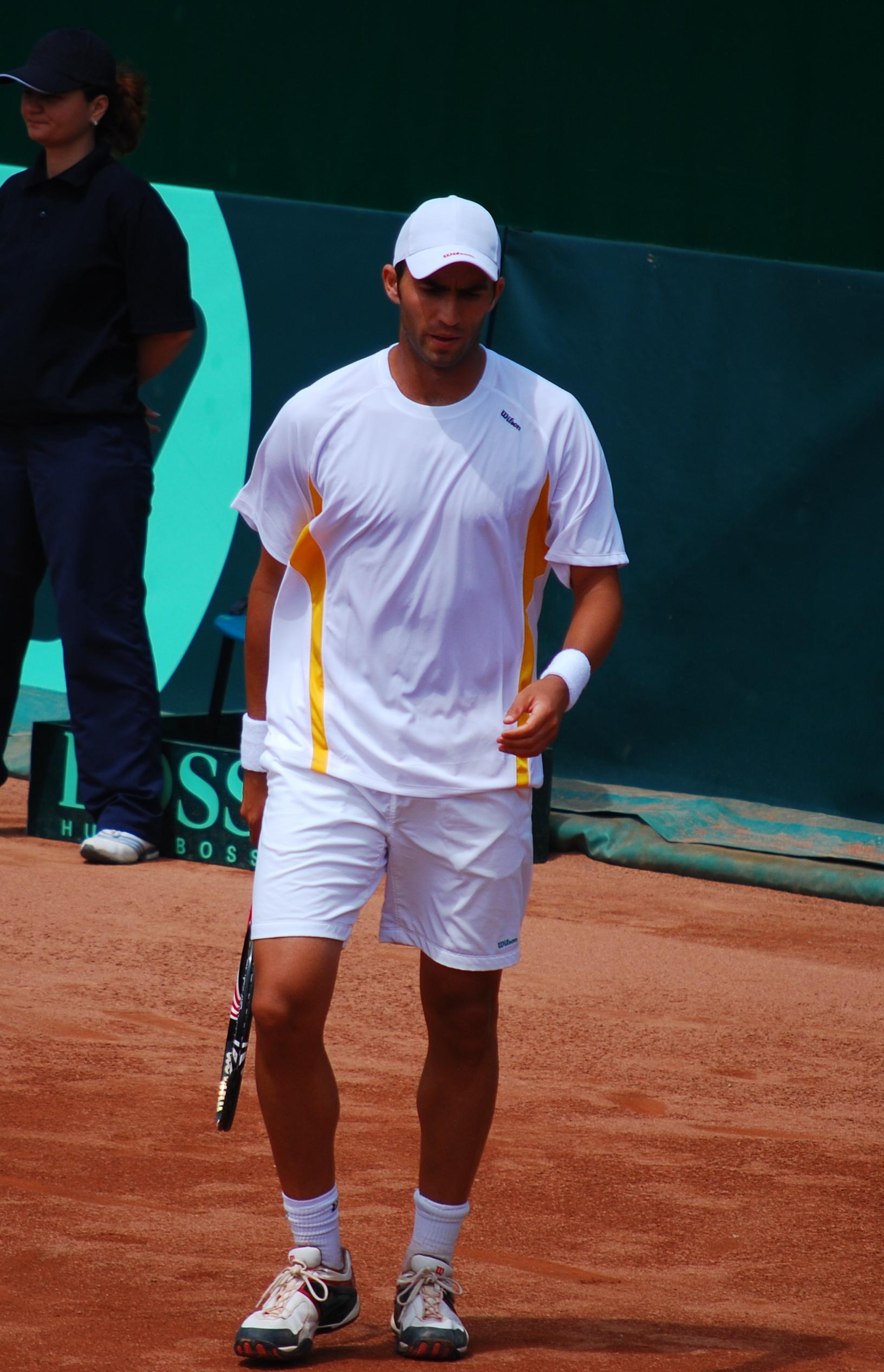
Horia Tecău

Player	W-L (Total)	W-L (Singles)	W-L (Doubles)	Ties	Debut
Alexandru Bardan	2–3	2–2	0–1	2	1963
Alexandru Botez	0–1	0–1	0–0	1	1933
I. Bunea	0–3	0–2	0–1	1	1931
A. Cantacuzene	0–3	0–2	0–1	1	1934
Cristea Caralulis	4–8	3–5	1–3	4	1937
Marius Copil	2–2	1–1	1–1	4	2009
Gheorghe Cosac	9–14	1–6	8–8	16	1988
Victor Crivoi	3–7	3–7	0–0	7	2006
Adrian Cruciat	0–1	0–0	0–1	1	2008
Andrei Dăescu	0–1	0–1	0–0	1	2012
Andrei Dîrzu	11–17	4–12	7–5	12	1978
Laszlo Dorner	1–3	0–1	1–2	3	1928
Sever Dron	1–1	0–1	1–0	3	1969
Stefan Georgescu	0–1	0–0	0–1	1	1960
Alexandru Hamburger	0–3	0–2	0–1	1	1935
Victor Hănescu	16–17	14–13	2–4	19	2001
Dimitru Haradau	7–13	7–10	0–3	11	1973
Victor Ioniță	1–1	1–0	0–1	1	2004
Petru-Alexandru Luncanu	0–1	0–1	0–0	1	2012
Gheorghe Lupu	2–9	2–6	0–3	4	1925
Adrian Marcu	12–14	12–12	0–2	12	1984
Viorel Marcu	2–1	1–0	1–1	3	1970
Gavorielle-Traian Marcu	3–3	1–2	2–1	4	1977
Petre Mărmureanu	5–3	3–3	2–0	8	1962
Florin Mergea	3–4	1–1	2–3	7	2003
Nicolae Mişu	7–19	5–13	2–6	9	1922
Ionuț Moldovan	0–5	0–4	0–1	4	1997
Sever Mureşan	1–0	1–0	0–0	1	1970
Ilie Năstase	109–37	74–22	35–15	52	1966
Mihnea-Ion Năstase	0–1	0–0	0–1	1	1984
Constantin Năstase	1–6	1–5	0–1	3	1959
Toma Ovici	5–8	5–8	0–0	7	1972
Eduard Pană	0–1	0–1	0–0	1	1980
Andrei Pavel	40–22	32–15	8–7	27	1991
Dinu-Mihai Pescariu	10–11	9–8	1–3	12	1991
Ciprian Petre Porumb	3–2	0–0	3–2	5	1993
Ghica Poulieff	3–12	1–9	2–3	5	1927
Tibor Reti	1–1	0–1	1–0	1	1933
Răzvan Sabău	8–11	8–10	0–1	11	1993
Alfred San Galli	0–3	0–2	0–1	1	1926
Ionel Sânteiu	1–2	0–0	1–2	3	1973
Arnulf Schmidt	2–10	1–7	1–3	4	1935
Florin Segărceanu	38–25	23–15	15–10	25	1978
Viorel Sotiriu	0–2	0–2	0–0	1	1976
Misu Stern	0–3	0–2	0–1	1	1922
Horia Tecău	6–9	0–2	6–7	13	2003
Ion Țiriac	70–39	40–28	30–11	43	1959
Gabriel Trifu	7–12	0–4	7–8	15	1997
Adrian Ungur	3–3	3–3	0–0	4	2010
Mihai Vanta	1–1	1–1	0–0	2	1987
Gheorghe Viziru	8–12	7–7	1–5	7	1948
Marian Viziru	1–3	0–0	1–3	4	1957
Adrian Voinea	10–8	10–8	0–0	12	1995
Cornel Zacopceanu	0–2	0–2	0–0	1	1957
