= Charles Beckman =

American tennis player

- Country (sports): United States
- Born: March 1, 1965 (age 61) Louisville, Kentucky, United States
- Height: 6 ft 1 in (1.85 m)
- Turned pro: 1987
- Plays: Right-handed
- Prize money: $215,307

Singles
- Career record: 1–3
- Career titles: 0
- Highest ranking: No. 355 (July 25, 1988)

Doubles
- Career record: 70–107
- Career titles: 0
- Highest ranking: No. 48 (July 16, 1990)

Grand Slam doubles results
- Australian Open: 2R (1991)
- French Open: 2R (1990, 1991)
- Wimbledon: 1R (1988, 1990, 1991, 1992)
- US Open: 3R (1989, 1991)

Grand Slam mixed doubles results
- Australian Open: 1R (1990, 1992)
- French Open: 3R (1992)
- Wimbledon: 2R (1988)
- US Open: 2R (1990)

Charles Beckman (born March 1, 1965) is an American former professional tennis player.

== Career ==
A doubles specialist, Beckman went to the University of Texas and played collegiate tennis for four years. He was a doubles All-American in three of those years and with regular partner Royce Deppe finished NCAA doubles runners-up in 1985, to Kelly Jones and Carlos di Laura.

Beckman made Grand Slam appearances in the men's doubles 16 times and mixed doubles nine times. He didn't miss a Grand Slam event from the 1989 US Open to the 1992 US Open. The American made the third round at three Grand Slam tournaments, the 1989 US Open (with Shelby Cannon), the 1991 US Open (with Sven Salumaa) and the 1992 French Open (with Clare Wood).

With Shelby Cannon, Beckman made the doubles final of the 1989 Player's Canadian Open, a Grand Prix Championship Series event. The pair were defeated in the final by Kelly Evernden and Todd Witsken.

== Grand Prix career finals ==
=== Doubles: 1 (0–1) ===
Result	W/L	Date	Tournament	Surface	Partner	Opponents	Score
Loss	0–1	Aug 1989	Montreal, Canada	Hard	(United States) Shelby Cannon	(New Zealand) Kelly Evernden (United States) Todd Witsken	3–6, 3–6

== Challenger titles ==
=== Doubles: (4) ===
No.	Year	Tournament	Surface	Partner	Opponents	Score
1.	1988	Vienna, Austria	Carpet	(United States) Mark Basham	(Austria) Thomas Muster (Austria) Michael Oberleitner	6–3, 3–6, 6–3
2.	1989	Raleigh, United States	Clay	(United States) Luke Jensen	(Netherlands) Paul Haarhuis (Belgium) Denis Langaskens	7–5, 6–4
3.	1989	Rio de Janeiro, Brazil	Hard	(United States) Shelby Cannon	(Brazil) Dacio Campos (Brazil) Luiz Mattar	6–3, 6–2
4.	1989	Brasília, Brazil	Hard	(France) Jean-Philippe Fleurian	(Argentina) Javier Frana (Argentina) Gustavo Luza	4–6, 6–3, 6–0
