= Stefano Mezzadri =

Swiss tennis player

- Country (sports): Switzerland
- Born: 26 May 1967 (age 58)
- Plays: Right-handed
- Prize money: $29,170

Singles
- Career record: 0–1
- Highest ranking: No. 292 (9 November 1987)

Grand Slam singles results
- Wimbledon: Q1 (1987)

Doubles
- Career record: 3–12
- Highest ranking: No. 206 (23 April 1990)

Grand Slam doubles results
- Wimbledon: Q1 (1987)

Stefano Mezzadri (born 26 May 1967) is a Swiss former professional tennis player.

Mezzadri appeared in his only Grand Prix circuit singles main draw at Geneva in 1987, with the tournament won by his older brother Claudio, a Davis Cup representative for Switzerland. As a doubles player he was a semi-finalist at Geneva in 1990 and won one ATP Challenger title. He played in qualifiers at the 1987 Wimbledon Championships.

== Challenger titles ==
=== Doubles: (1) ===
| No. | Date | Tournament | Surface | Partner | Opponent | Score |
|---|---|---|---|---|---|---|
| 1. | 1988 | Geneva, Switzerland | Clay | (Italy) Nevio Devide | (Romania) Mihnea-Ion Năstase (India) Srinivasan Vasudevan | 7–6, 4–6, 6–4 |
