= Markus Rackl =

German tennis player

- Full name: Markus Rackl
- Country (sports): West Germany; Germany
- Born: 3 March 1969 (age 56); Traunstein, West Germany
- Plays: Left-handed
- Prize money: $90,675

Singles
- Career record: 8–14
- Career titles: 0
- Highest ranking: No. 129 (20 June 1988)

Doubles
- Highest ranking: No. 491 (30 November 1987)

Markus Rackl (born 3 March 1969) is a former professional tennis player from Germany.

== Biography ==
A left-handed player from Traunstein, Rackl played professionally in the late 1980s and early 1990s. His best performance on tour came when he made the semi-finals of the Madrid Tennis Grand Prix in 1988, with wins over Marcelo Ingaramo, Edoardo Mazza and Sergio Casal. In 1988 he was also a quarter-finalist at the Athens Open after beating top seed Tore Meinecke and won a Challenger title in Montabaur. He won one further Challenger event, in Salzburg in 1991. As a coach he has worked with Alexander Satschko.

== Challenger titles ==
=== Singles: (2) ===
No.	Year	Tournament	Surface	Opponent	Score
1.	1988	Montabaur, West Germany	Clay	(Socialist Federal Republic of Yugoslavia) Bruno Orešar	6–3, 4–6, 7–5
2.	1991	Salzburg, Austria	Clay	(West Germany) Martin Sinner	1–6, 6–3, 6–4
