= Roberto Lopes =

Roberto Lopes may refer to:

- Roberto Lopes da Costa (born 1966), Brazilian volleyball player
- Roberto Lopes (footballer, born 1983), Brazilian footballer
- Pico Lopes (Roberto Carlos Lopes, born 1992), Irish-Cape Verdean footballer

== See also ==
- Roberto López (disambiguation)
- Robert Lopez (disambiguation)
