= Daniel Montes de Oca =

Daniel Montes de Oca may refer to:

- Daniel Montes de Oca (tennis) (born 1952), Uruguayan tennis player
- Daniel Montes de Oca (footballer) (born 1952), Mexican footballer
