= Roberto López (artist) =

Spanish artist and composer

Roberto López Corrales (born 28 June 1974, in Alicante), also known by the artistic pseudonym ROLOCO, is a Spanish visual artist and composer.

== Biography ==
A multidisciplinary artist, working with sound and visual art. His works are characterized by the superposition of independent planes, this is called by Roberto López as visual and sonorous intoxication.

Roberto López took an interest in art from an early age, developing his painting skills and then completing studies in arts and industrial-graphic design at the School of Arts and Crafts in Alcoy. At the same time, he studied piano and violin at the Professional Conservatory of Music of his home town, continuing his training with a postgraduate course in Composition at the ECCA (Alcoy School of Composition and Creation) and at the INJUVE Composition Meetings.

In 1998 he met Sergi Jordà and Carlus Padrissa and collaborates with La Fura dels Baus for FMOL (Faust Music On Line) Project for their shows Faust v.3.0 (1998) and D.Q. Don Quijote en Barcelona (2000) opera by José Luis Turina.

In 2002 he wrote a work at the request of the Ministry of Education, Culture and Sport, through the Directorate-General of Cultural Cooperation and Communication, to represent Spain in the EE.UU. in the conferences on Spanish Music and Architecture in the 20th century: Modernist Barcelona and the last avant-gardes.

He was awarded 1st prize at the Injuve Composition Meetings 2001 and 2002. In these meetings he met composers as José Manuel López López, Mauricio Sotelo, Beat Furrer, Joan Cerveró and also Indonesian composer & pianist Ananda Sukarlan who then performs his piano work, as well as composers of his generation as Voro Garcia, Aureliano Cattaneo or Eneko Vadillo.

He has conducted the Barcelona Municipal Symphony Band at the LEM Festival, part of the 6th International Experimental Music Festival in Barcelona 2002.

He was selected in 2003 by the Reading Panel of the Spanish Section of the ISCM (International Society for Contemporary Music).

In 2003, he was composer-in-residence at the JONDE (Spanish National Youth Orchestra).

In 2007 he was awarded 2nd prize CDMD - Fundación Autor and that same year he was selected to exhibit in the competition drawing Fundación Gregorio Prieto.

His music has been edited by Piles Editorial and recorded by RNE - RTVE.

Roberto López has worked especially closely with Grup Instrumental de Valencia and Espai Sonor Ensemble.

== Main festivals ==
- International Contemporary Music Festival of Alicante.
- Concert season CDMC, Madrid.
- Concert season National Auditorium, Madrid.
- Concert season Musicadhoy, Madrid.
- International Contemporary Music Festival of Valencia ENSEMS.
- International Contemporary Music Festival of Sueca MOSTRA SONORA.
- Rozart Mix XXI Festival. Solo XXI, Valencia.
- International Experimental Music Festival of Barcelona.
- Festival d´Ensembles. Músicas del S.XXI, Barcelona.
- Festival Otoñal Soriano.
- Festival Década I. Música 2000, Zaragoza.
- International Contemporary Music Festival of Salamanca SMASH.
- Opus 9.1 Festival of Bordeaux.

== Main halls and spaces ==
- Museo Nacional Centro de Arte Reina Sofía (MNCARS), Madrid.
- Thyssen-Bornemisza Museum, Madrid.
- Circulo de Bellas Artes, Madrid.
- IVAM, Instituto Valenciano de Arte Moderno, Valencia.
- Talia Theatre, Valencia.
- Principal Theater, Alicante.
- Arniches Theater, Alicante.
- National Auditorium, Madrid.
- CUNY Graduate Center, New York
- Teatre Nacional de Catalunya, Barcelona.
- Gran Teatre del Liceu, Barcelona.
- Auditorio L´Espai, Barcelona.
- L´Auditori, Barcelona.
- Auditorium - Palacio de Congresos, Zaragoza.
- Art Center DA2, Salamanca.
