= Axel Hornung =

German tennis player and coach

- Country (sports): West Germany
- Born: 6 June 1966 (age 58); Köln, West Germany
- Height: 5 ft 11 in (180 cm)
- Plays: Right-handed
- Prize money: $13,304

Singles
- Highest ranking: No. 422 (30 Mar 1987)

Doubles
- Career record: 1–6 (ATP Tour)
- Highest ranking: No. 125 (20 Jul 1987)

Axel Hornung (born 6 June 1966) is a German tennis coach and former professional player. He has previously served as the national tennis coach of Luxembourg.

Hornung, who comes from Köln, turned professional in 1986 and reached a best singles world ranking of 422.

Ranked as high as 125 in the world for doubles, he had his best year in 1987 when he made five Grand Prix main draw appearances and won an ATP Challenger title in Montabaur.

== ATP Challenger titles ==
=== Doubles: (1) ===
No.	Date	Tournament	Surface	Partner	Opponents	Score
1.	May 1987	Montabaur Challenger; Montabaur, West Germany	Clay	(West Germany) Christian Saceanu	(Mexico) Jorge Lozano (Mexico) Agustín Moreno	6–3, 6–4
