= Nevio Devide =

Italian tennis player

- Full name: Nevio Devide
- Country (sports): Italy
- Born: 2 December 1966 (age 59) Saronno, Italy
- Plays: Right-handed
- Prize money: $26,277

Singles
- Highest ranking: No. 207 (12 June 1989)

Doubles
- Career record: 2–6
- Career titles: 0
- Highest ranking: No. 157 (31 August 1987)

Nevio Devide (born 2 December 1966) is an Italian manager and a former professional tennis player from Italy.

== Biography ==
=== Tennis career ===
Devidè, a right-handed player, was born in Saronno and based out of Solaro. Playing on the professional tour in the late 1980s, he won four Challenger titles, all in doubles. He competed in several Grand Prix doubles tournaments, most notably at Bordeaux in 1987, where he and partner Bernhard Pils were semi-finalists. In singles his best performance was a runner-up finish at the 1989 Modena Challenger, with wins over Cristiano Caratti, Bruce Derlin and Menno Oosting.

=== Management activities ===
Devidè now works in the sport marketing industry. After working in the field of sporting events, and having been in Media Partners (now Infront Sport), he takes on the role of the Marketing Director for the 2006 Winter Olympics's organising committee. After this experience he assumes the role of CEO and CFO of a leading company in the field of information technologies solutions within the government’s intelligence sector. Now he is the Chief Revenue Officer (CRO) for the Milano Cortina 2026 Olympic and Paralympic Winter Games Organising Committee

== Challenger titles ==
=== Doubles: (4) ===
No.	Year	Tournament	Surface	Partner	Opponents	Score
1.	1987	Istanbul, Turkey	Clay	(Italy) Alberto Paris	(Romania) Adrian Marcu (Romania) Florin Segărceanu	7–5, 6–2
2.	1988	Geneva, Switzerland	Clay	(Switzerland) Stefano Mezzadri	(Romania) Mihnea-Ion Năstase (India) Srinivasan Vasudevan	7–6, 4–6, 6–4
3.	1988	Messina, Italy	Clay	(Italy) Simone Colombo	(Italy) Ugo Colombini (Peru) Carlos di Laura	6–4, 6–4
4.	1989	Modena, Italy	Clay	(Italy) Simone Colombo	(Italy) Corrado Aprili (Italy) Massimiliano Narducci	3–6, 6–1, 7–6
