= Stéphane Grenier (tennis) =

French tennis player

- Country (sports): France
- Residence: Fontainebleau
- Born: 9 January 1968 (age 58) Vannes, France
- Height: 1.90 m (6 ft 3 in)
- Plays: Right-handed
- Prize money: $52,788

Singles
- Career record: 1–4
- Career titles: 0
- Highest ranking: No. 192 (29 October 1990)

Grand Slam singles results
- French Open: 2R (1990)

Doubles
- Career record: 4–4
- Career titles: 0
- Highest ranking: No. 245 (6 June 1988)

Grand Slam doubles results
- French Open: 2R (1988, 1990)

Stéphane Grenier (born 9 January 1968) is a former professional tennis player from France. He is now a tennis coach in Le Pradet.

Grenier first achieved attention winning the Galéa trophy for French Under-21 doubles in 1987. He qualified for his first Grand Slam in 1988, the French Open. He played Brazilian Marcelo Hennemann in the opening round and lost in four sets. In the men's doubles he teamed up with Olivier Delaître and they reached the second round, with a win over countrymen Thierry Champion and Thierry Tulasne. Also that year, Grenier made the semi-finals of the Lorraine Open, again partnering Delaître.

The Frenchman appeared at Roland Garros again in 1990 and this time managed to progress past the first round, beating Jeremy Bates of Britain in straight sets. He was eliminated from the tournament in the second round by Aaron Krickstein. Grenier competed in the men's doubles as well, with Tarik Benhabiles and the pair had a win over Ville Jansson and Scott Warner, but once more were unable to reach the third round.
