= Alain Lemaitre =

Mexican tennis player

- Full name: Alain Lemaitre Sendel
- Country (sports): Mexico
- Born: 14 October 1968 (age 56)

Singles
- Highest ranking: No. 344 (16 Apr 1990)

Grand Slam singles results
- Wimbledon: Q1 (1986)

Doubles
- Highest ranking: No. 328 (12 Mar 1990)

Alain Lemaitre Sendel (born 14 October 1968) is a Mexican former professional tennis player.

Born in 1968, Lemaitre is the son of journalist Virginia Sendel and tennis player Yves Lemaitre, who coached Rafael Osuna. His brother, also named Yves, played on the professional tour. On his mother's side, he is the grandson of Mexican actress Rebeca Iturbide as well as the grandson of Davis Cup player Federico Sendel.

Lemaitre reached a best singles world ranking of 344, competing in Wimbledon qualifying and as high up as the ATP Challenger Tour. He was a singles quarter-finalist and doubles champion at the 1989 Bogota Challenger.

He currently coaches fellow countryman Rodrigo Pacheco Méndez.

== ATP Challenger Tour finals ==
=== Doubles: 1 (1 title) ===
Legend ATP Challenger Tour (1–0)

Result	W–L	Date	Tournament	Tier	Surface	Partner	Opponents	Score
Win	1–0	Oct 1989	Bogotá, Colombia	Challenger	Clay	(Mexico) Roberto López	(Venezuela) Carlos Claverie (Venezuela) Alfonso Mora	3–6, 6–3, 6–0
