= Jacco Van Duyn =

Dutch tennis player

- Country (sports): Netherlands
- Prize money: $20,843

Singles
- Highest ranking: No. 264 (23 Mar 1992)

Grand Slam singles results
- French Open: Q1 (1992)
- US Open: Q1 (1992)

Doubles
- Career record: 0–1 (ATP Tour)
- Highest ranking: No. 249 (11 Mar 1991)

Jacco Van Duyn is a Dutch former professional tennis player.

Van Duyn began competing on the professional tour during the late 1980s and reached a career best singles ranking of 264, in a career which included qualifying draw appearances at the French and US Opens. As a doubles player he featured in an ATP Tour main draw at the 1991 Athens Open and won the Santiago Challenger tournament in 1992.

== ATP Challenger titles ==
=== Doubles: (1) ===
No.	Date	Tournament	Surface	Partner	Opponents	Score
1.	Mar 1992	Santiago Challenger; Santiago, Chile	Clay	(Sweden) Christer Allgårdh	(Argentina) Luis Lobo (Argentina) Martin Stringari	4–6, 7–6, 7–5
