= Edoardo Mazza =

Italian tennis player

- Country (sports): Italy
- Born: 15 March 1964 (age 61); Rome, Italy
- Height: 5 ft 9 in (175 cm)
- Plays: Right-handed
- Prize money: $30,821

Singles
- Career record: 2–8
- Highest ranking: No. 152 (24 August 1987)

Doubles
- Career record: 1–2
- Highest ranking: No. 416 (24 August 1987)

Edoardo Mazza (born 15 March 1964) is an Italian former professional tennis player.

Born in Rome, Mazza competed on the professional tour in the 1980s and reached a career best ranking of 152.

Mazza, a right-handed player, won a Challenger title at Knokke in 1987. His best performance on the Grand Prix circuit was a win over the fourth seeded Guillermo Pérez Roldán at Madrid in 1988, with the Argentine player ranked 26 in the world at the time.

== Challenger titles ==
=== Singles: (1) ===
Year	Tournament	Surface	Opponent	Score
1987	Knokke, Belgium	Clay	(Belgium) Eduardo Masso	7–6, 6–4
