= Christian Weis =

German tennis player

- Full name: Christian Weis
- Country (sports): West Germany; Germany
- Born: 20 June 1968 (age 56); Augsburg, West Germany
- Height: 1.80 m (5 ft 11 in)
- Plays: Right-handed
- Prize money: $31,764

Singles
- Career record: 0–1
- Highest ranking: No. 197 (15 April 1991)

Doubles
- Career record: 0–1
- Highest ranking: No. 326 (10 July 1989)

Christian Weis (born 20 June 1968) is a former professional tennis player from Germany.

== Biography ==
Weis, a right-handed player from Augsburg, turned professional in 1986 and featured mostly on the Challenger tour.

In 1987, he appeared in the main draw of two Grand Prix tournaments, partnering Hans Schwaier in the doubles at Palermo and qualifying for the singles at Sao Paulo, where he lost his first round match to Tore Meinecke in three sets.

Most successful on clay, he was the singles runner-up in two Challenger events in Brazil and partnered with Jaroslav Navrátil to win the doubles title at the Neu-Ulm Challenger.

After retiring from the professional circuit he continued to play Bundesliga tennis for TC Augsburg.

== Challenger titles ==
=== Doubles: (1) ===
| No. | Year | Tournament | Surface | Partner | Opponents | Score |
|---|---|---|---|---|---|---|
| 1. | 1989 | Neu Ulm, West Germany | Clay | (Czechoslovakia) Jaroslav Navrátil | (Italy) Simone Colombo (Italy) Nevio Devide | (W/O) |
