= Boaz Merenstein =

Israeli tennis player

- Native name: בועז מרנשטיין
- Country (sports): Israel
- Born: 3 April 1970 (age 55); Tel Aviv, Israel
- Height: 5 ft 11 in (180 cm)
- Plays: Left-handed
- Prize money: $14,727

Singles
- Career record: 2–4
- Highest ranking: No. 279 (18 April 1988)

Grand Slam singles results
- Wimbledon: Q1 (1989)

Doubles
- Career record: 1–2
- Highest ranking: No. 342 (26 March 1990)
Medal record
Maccabiah Games
Gold medal – first place	1989 Israel	Men's Doubles

Boaz Merenstein (Hebrew: בועז מרנשטיין; born 3 April 1970) is an Israeli former professional tennis player.

== Biography ==
Merenstein was born into a Tel Aviv family with German origins.

He won a gold medal in men's doubles at the 1989 Maccabiah Games, playing alongside Shahar Perkiss.

A left-handed player, Merenstein was a Davis Cup squad member for Israel and featured in the singles main draw of every Tel Aviv Open from 1987 to 1990, making the second round twice. One of his first round wins came in 1989 against Matt Anger, a former world number 23. In both of his second round matches he was eliminated by Amos Mansdorf.

In 1992 he played collegiate tennis for Pepperdine University.
