= Srinivasan Vasudevan =

Indian tennis player

- Country (sports): India
- Born: 4 January 1962 (age 63); Madras, India
- Height: 190 cm (6 ft 3 in)
- Plays: Right-handed
- Prize money: US$66,359

Singles
- Career record: 4–4
- Highest ranking: 166 (29 December 1986)

Doubles
- Career record: 2–12
- Highest ranking: 178 (14 November 1988)

Team competitions
- Davis Cup: F (1987)
Medal record
Men's Tennis
Representing India
Asian Games
Silver medal – second place	1982 New Delhi	Men's team
Bronze medal – third place	1990 Beijing	Men's team

Srinivasan Vasudevan (born 4 January 1962) is a retired Indian professional tennis player. He was born in Madras and was active between 1980 and 1994. Vasudevan was a member of the Indian Davis Cup team captained by Vijay Amritraj which reached the 1987 Davis Cup final against Sweden. Vasudevan represented India at the Davis Cup competitions between 1983 and 1991. He was part of Asian Games Silver Medalist in the Team Tennis Event in 1982. He was also the member of 1990 Asian Games Tennis Team and was part of bronze medalist in the Team event
