= Eduardo Vélez (tennis) =

Mexican tennis player

- Full name: Eduardo Vélez
- Country (sports): Mexico
- Born: 20 April 1969 (age 56) Monterrey, Mexico
- Plays: Right-handed
- Prize money: $26,265

Singles
- Career record: 3–5
- Career titles: 0; 0 Challenger, 0 Futures
- Highest ranking: No. 215 (30 November 1987)

Grand Slam singles results
- Wimbledon: Q3 (1990)

Doubles
- Career record: 0–1
- Career titles: 0; 0 Challenger, 0 Futures
- Highest ranking: No. 435 (21 November 1988)
- Last updated on: 15 April 2022.

Eduardo Vélez (born 20 April 1969) is a former professional tennis player from Mexico. Vélez won the Wimbledon Boys' title, the second successive season a Mexican won the Junior singles event, as he was defeated in the final, the previous year 1985, by countryman Leonardo Lavalle.

== Biography ==
Vélez, who comes from Monterrey, attended Cardinal Gibbons High School in Fort Lauderdale and trained at the local tennis academy run by Gary Kesl. He won the Junior Orange Bowl (Under 14s) in 1983 and was the Mexican junior champion in 1984. A Mexican Davis Cup squad member, he twice made the boys' singles final at the Wimbledon Championships. He defeated Javier Sánchez to win the 1986 Wimbledon Championships, the second successive time a Mexican won the title, as he was beaten in the final by Leonardo Lavalle in 1985.

After his success at Wimbledon, Vélez played in the main draw of two Grand Prix tournaments, the U.S. Pro Tennis Championships in Boston and the Washington DC Tennis Classic. In 1987, he played in the main draw of the Bristol Open; then in 1988, he featured at the Livingston Open, where he lost in the first round to Andre Agassi. He also competed on the Challenger circuit and in 1988 won a title in Acapulco. His 1989 season was ruined by injury, he had to undergo surgery on his knee cap and soon after hurt his back. In 1990, he qualified for the Canadian Open, a top tier event part of the ATP Championship Series. He defeated Dan Goldie in the first round, before losing in the second round to ninth seed David Wheaton.

== Junior Grand Slam finals ==
=== Singles: 2 (1 title, 1 runner-up) ===
Result	Year	Tournament	Surface	Opponent	Score
Loss	1985	Wimbledon	Grass	(Mexico) Leonardo Lavalle	4–6, 4–6
Win	1986	Wimbledon	Grass	(Spain) Javier Sanchez	6–3, 7–5
