= Adrian Marcu =

Romanian tennis player

- Full name: Adrian Marcu
- Country (sports): Romania
- Born: 3 December 1961 (age 64) Hunedoara, Romania
- Height: 191 cm (6 ft 3 in)
- Plays: Right-handed

Singles
- Career record: 0–1
- Highest ranking: No. 190 (28 March 1988)

Doubles
- Career record: 1–3
- Highest ranking: No. 195 (24 June 1985)
Medal record
Representing Romania
Summer Universiade
Bronze medal – third place	1983 Edmonton	Men's doubles

Adrian Marcu (born 3 December 1961) is a former professional tennis player from Romania.

== Biography ==
Marcu, a right-handed player from Hunedoara, began touring professionally in the early 1980s. Competing on the Grand Prix circuit, he was a doubles quarter-finalist at Viña del Mar in 1982 and made his only singles main draw appearance at the 1987 Mercedes Cup held in Stuttgart. In 1988 he won a Challenger title in doubles at Sofia.

As a Romanian representative he won a bronze medal in doubles at the 1983 Summer Universiade and appeared in a total of 12 Davis Cup ties for his country, including a World Group relegation play-off against West Germany in 1984.

He is a former coach of Simona Halep. In September 2021 he was reappointed as her coach, to work alongside Daniel Dobre, after the departure of Darren Cahill.

== Challenger titles ==
=== Doubles: (1) ===
No.	Year	Tournament	Surface	Partner	Opponents	Score
1.	1988	Sofia, Bulgaria	Carpet	(Romania) Florin Segărceanu	(Czechoslovakia) Jaroslav Bulant (Czechoslovakia) Richard Vogel	7–5, 6–2

== See also ==
- List of Romania Davis Cup team representatives
