= Roberto López (tennis) =

Mexican tennis player

- Country (sports): Mexico
- Born: 5 April 1968 (age 56)

Singles
- Highest ranking: No. 355 (16 Apr 1990)

Doubles
- Highest ranking: No. 284 (11 Jun 1990)

Roberto López (born 5 April 1968) is a Mexican former professional tennis player.

López, who played at Wimbledon in the juniors, began on the professional tour in the late 1980s. He had a best singles world ranking of 355 and was a quarter-finalist at the 1989 San Luis Potosi Challenger. His only Challenger title came in doubles, when he teamed up with Alain Lemaitre to win at Bogota in 1989.

== ATP Challenger Tour finals ==
=== Doubles: 1 (1 title) ===
Legend ATP Challenger Tour (1–0)

Result	W–L	Date	Tournament	Tier	Surface	Partner	Opponents	Score
Win	1–0	Oct 1989	Bogotá, Colombia	Challenger	Clay	(Mexico) Alain Lemaitre	(Venezuela) Carlos Claverie (Venezuela) Alfonso Mora	3–6, 6–3, 6–0
