= Rubén Gajardo (tennis) =

Chilean tennis player

- Country (sports): Chile
- Born: 5 January 1968 (age 57)
- Prize money: $11,871

Singles
- Career record: 1–3
- Highest ranking: No. 348 (11 Apr 1994)

Doubles
- Career record: 0–3
- Highest ranking: No. 375 (3 Aug 1987)

Rubén Gajardo (born 5 January 1968) is a Chilean former professional tennis player.

Gajardo, a South American Games silver medalist for Chile, began competing on the professional tour in the late 1980s. He had a career high singles ranking of 348, with his best Challenger performance a semi-final appearance at Ostend in 1988. At Grand Prix level he made a second round once, when he beat Andrei Olhovskiy at Kitzbühel in 1989.
