= Michael Oberleitner =

Austrian tennis player and coach

- Country (sports): Austria
- Born: 17 July 1966 (age 58); Vienna, Austria
- Height: 6 ft 3 in (191 cm)
- Prize money: $15,372

Singles
- Career record: 0–3
- Highest ranking: No. 280 (4 July 1988)

Doubles
- Career record: 0–2
- Highest ranking: No. 197 (6 June 1988)

Michael Oberleitner (born 17 July 1966) is an Austrian tennis coach and former professional player.

Oberleitner, who was born in Vienna, had a career high ranking of 280 in the world and appeared in three singles main draws at his home tournament, the Vienna Open (1985, 1988 and 1989).

On the ATP Challenger Tour, Oberleitner twice made the final four and en route to the semi-finals in Vienna in 1987 had a win over world number 78 Stefan Eriksson. In 1988 he reached a Challenger doubles final partnering Thomas Muster.

Oberleitner was the coach of Alexander Peya.

His son, Neil Oberleitner, is a tennis player and competes at Futures level.
