= 1983 South Australian Open – Doubles =

Doubles
- 1983 South Australian Open

Final
- Champions: (Australia) Craig A. Miller (United States) Eric Sherbeck
- Runners-up: (Australia) Broderick Dyke (Australia) Rod Frawley
- Score: 6–3, 4–6, 6–4

Events
Singles	Doubles
← 1982 ·	South Australian Open	· 1984 →

Pat Cash and Chris Johnstone were the defending champions, but did not participate together this year. Cash partnered Mike Bauer, losing in the quarterfinals. Johnstone partnered Wayne Hampson, losing in the quarterfinals.

Craig A. Miller and Eric Sherbeck won the title, defeating Broderick Dyke and Rod Frawley 6–3, 4–6, 6–4 in the final.

== Seeds ==
1. (United States) Mike Bauer / (Australia) Pat Cash (quarterfinals)
2. (Australia) Broderick Dyke / (Australia) Rod Frawley (final)
3. (Australia) John Alexander / (Australia) John Fitzgerald (first round)
4. (Australia) David Graham / (Australia) Laurie Warder (semifinals)

== Draw ==
=== Key ===
- Q = Qualifier
- WC = Wild card
- LL = Lucky loser
- Alt = Alternate
- SE = Special exempt
- PR = Protected ranking
- ITF = ITF entry
- JE = Junior exempt
- w/o = Walkover
- r = Retired
- d = Defaulted
- SR = Special ranking

=== Draw ===
First round
1	(United States) M Bauer (Australia) P Cash	6	6
(New Zealand) D Mustard (New Zealand) J Simpson	3	4
(New Zealand) M Lewis (Australia) G Whitecross	6	6
(United States) L Bourne (United States) C Hooper	4	4
3	(Australia) J Alexander (Australia) J Fitzgerald	6	3
(Australia) D Cahill (Australia) A Lane	7	6
(South Africa) B Levine (Netherlands) H van Boeckel	6	6	4
(Australia) C Miller (United States) E Sherbeck	4	7	6
(United States) A Andrews (United States) J Van Nostrand	6	3	4
(United States) J Austin (United States) S Brawley	2	6	6
(Australia) P Johnston (United States) L Shiras	3	7	6
4	(Australia) D Graham (Australia) L Warder	6	6	7
(Australia) W Hampson (Australia) C Johnstone	3	6	6
(United Kingdom) J Bates (United Kingdom) J Smith	6	4	2
(Australia) B Drewett (Australia) W Masur	5	4
2	(Australia) B Dyke (Australia) R Frawley	7	6

Quarterfinals
1	(United States) M Bauer (Australia) P Cash	7	6	5
(New Zealand) M Lewis (Australia) G Whitecross	6	7	7
(Australia) D Cahill (Australia) A Lane	4	6
(Australia) C Miller (United States) E Sherbeck	6	7
(United States) J Austin (United States) S Brawley	3	4
4	(Australia) D Graham (Australia) L Warder	6	6
(Australia) W Hampson (Australia) C Johnstone	4	6
2	(Australia) B Dyke (Australia) R Frawley	6	7

Semifinals
(New Zealand) M Lewis (Australia) G Whitecross	4	4
(Australia) C Miller (United States) E Sherbeck	6	6
4	(Australia) D Graham (Australia) L Warder	6	2
2	(Australia) B Dyke (Australia) R Frawley	7	6

Final
(Australia) C Miller (United States) E Sherbeck	6	4	6
2	(Australia) B Dyke (Australia) R Frawley	3	6	4
