= 1981 South Australian Open – Doubles =

Doubles
- 1981 South Australian Open

Final
- Champions: (Australia) Colin Dibley (Australia) John James
- Runners-up: (United States) Craig Edwards (South Africa) Eddie Edwards
- Score: 6–3, 6–4

Details
- Draw: 16
- Seeds: 4

Events
Singles	Doubles
- South Australian Open

The tournament was being held for the first time since 1979.

Colin Dibley and John James won the doubles title, defeating Craig Edwards and Eddie Edwards 6–3, 6–4 in the final.

== Seeds ==
1. (Australia) Ross Case / (Australia) Geoff Masters (quarterfinals)
2. (United States) Tom Gullikson / (New Zealand) Chris Lewis (semifinals)
3. (Australia) Syd Ball / (Australia) Cliff Letcher (quarterfinals)
4. (Australia) Colin Dibley / (Australia) John James (champions)

== Draw ==
Key

- Q = Qualifier
- WC = Wild card
- LL = Lucky loser
- Alt = Alternate
- ITF = ITF entry
- PR = Protected ranking
- SR = Special ranking
- SE = Special exempt
- JE = Junior exempt
- JR = Junior Accelerator Programme entrant
- CO = College Accelerator Programme entrant
- NG = Next Gen Accelerator Program entrant
- w/o = Walkover
- r = Retired
- d = Defaulted

=== Draw ===
First round
1	(Australia) R Case (Australia) G Masters	6	6
(Australia) P Cash (Australia) S Wood	3	4
(United States) J DiLouie (Australia) W Hampson	5	7	6
(United States) R Fisher (United Kingdom) J Smith	7	6	3
4	(Australia) C Dibley (Australia) J James	6	5	6
(Australia) C Johnstone (Philippines) B Sison	0	7	3
(Australia) D Collings (Australia) B Guan	6	3	6
(United States) G Holroyd (United States) C Wittus	3	6	3
(United States) C Edwards (South Africa) E Edwards	6	6	6
(Australia) P Doohan (Australia) CA Miller	4	7	4
3	(Australia) S Ball (Australia) C Letcher	6	6
(Canada) W Cowan (West Germany) U Marten	4	3
(Australia) B Dyke (Australia) P Johnston	3	7	6
(Australia) J Fitzgerald (Australia) W Pascoe	6	6	4
(Australia) B Drewett (Australia) M Edmondson	6	6	5
2	(United States) T Gullikson (New Zealand) C Lewis	3	7	7

Quarterfinals
1	(Australia) R Case (Australia) G Masters	5	7	4
(United States) J DiLouie (Australia) W Hampson	7	5	6
4	(Australia) C Dibley (Australia) J James	6	6
(Australia) D Collings (Australia) B Guan	4	1
(United States) C Edwards (South Africa) E Edwards	7	1	6
3	(Australia) S Ball (Australia) C Letcher	6	6	4
(Australia) B Dyke (Australia) P Johnston	6	3
2	(United States) T Gullikson (New Zealand) C Lewis	7	6

Semifinals
(United States) J DiLouie (Australia) W Hampson	5	1
4	(Australia) C Dibley (Australia) J James	7	6
(United States) C Edwards (South Africa) E Edwards	6	7
2	(United States) T Gullikson (New Zealand) C Lewis	1	6

Final
4	(Australia) C Dibley (Australia) J James	6	6
(United States) C Edwards (South Africa) E Edwards	3	4
