= 1987 South Australian Open – Doubles =

Doubles
- 1987 South Australian Open

Final
- Champions: (Czechoslovakia) Ivan Lendl (United States) Bill Scanlon
- Runners-up: (Australia) Peter Doohan (Australia) Laurie Warder
- Score: 6–7, 6–3, 6–4

Events
Singles	Doubles
← 1985 ·	South Australian Open	· 1988 →

The event was not held the previous year.

Ivan Lendl and Bill Scanlon won the title, defeating Peter Doohan and Laurie Warder 6–7, 6–3, 6–4 in the final.

== Seeds ==
1. (Australia) John Fitzgerald / (Australia) Mark Kratzmann (quarterfinals)
2. (Australia) Broderick Dyke / (Australia) Wally Masur (first round)
3. (South Africa) Eddie Edwards / (South Africa) Christo van Rensburg (quarterfinals)
4. (Australia) Brad Drewett / (Australia) Mark Edmondson (quarterfinals)

== Draw ==
=== Key ===
- Q = Qualifier
- WC = Wild card
- LL = Lucky loser
- Alt = Alternate
- SE = Special exempt
- PR = Protected ranking
- ITF = ITF entry
- JE = Junior exempt
- w/o = Walkover
- r = Retired
- d = Defaulted
- SR = Special ranking

=== Draw ===
First round
1	(Australia) J Fitzgerald (Australia) M Kratzmann	7	7
(Israel) G Bloom (Argentina) J Frana	5	6
(United Kingdom) D Felgate (Australia) D Tyson	6	6
(United States) K Jones (United States) B Pearce	7	7
3	(South Africa) E Edwards (South Africa) C van Rensburg	6	7
(Australia) D Cahill (Australia) P Carter	2	5
(United States) S Denton (Israel) A Mansdorf	7	6	5
(Australia) P Doohan (Australia) L Warder	6	7	7
WC	(Czechoslovakia) I Lendl (United States) B Scanlon	6	6
(United Kingdom) J Bates (New Zealand) B Derlin	4	4
(Nigeria) N Odizor (Australia) M Woodforde	4	3
4	(Australia) B Drewett (Australia) M Edmondson	6	6
(Netherlands) M Schapers (Netherlands) H van Boeckel	2	4
(Canada) G Michibata (United States) B Schultz	6	6
(United States) M Anger (United States) K Flach	6	6
2	(Australia) B Dyke (Australia) W Masur	4	4

Quarterfinals
1	(Australia) J Fitzgerald (Australia) M Kratzmann	6	7	6
(United States) K Jones (United States) B Pearce	7	5	7
3	(South Africa) E Edwards (South Africa) C van Rensburg	5	6
(Australia) P Doohan (Australia) L Warder	7	7
WC	(Czechoslovakia) I Lendl (United States) B Scanlon	4	7	7
4	(Australia) B Drewett (Australia) M Edmondson	6	5	6
(Canada) G Michibata (United States) B Schultz	7	3	6
(United States) M Anger (United States) K Flach	6	6	7

Semifinals
(United States) K Jones (United States) B Pearce	7	6	6
(Australia) P Doohan (Australia) L Warder	6	7	7
WC	(Czechoslovakia) I Lendl (United States) B Scanlon	7	7
(United States) M Anger (United States) K Flach	6	6

Final
(Australia) P Doohan (Australia) L Warder	7	3	4
WC	(Czechoslovakia) I Lendl (United States) B Scanlon	6	6	6
