= 1982 South Australian Open – Singles =

Singles
- 1982 South Australian Open

Final
- Champion: (United States) Mike Bauer
- Runner-up: (Australia) Chris Johnstone
- Score: 4–6, 7–6, 6–2

Details
- Draw: 32
- Seeds: 8

Events
Singles	Doubles
← 1981 ·	South Australian Open	· 1983 →

Mark Edmondson was the defending champion, but did not participate this year.

Mike Bauer won the title, defeating Chris Johnstone 4–6, 7–6, 6–2 in the final.

== Seeds ==
1. (United States) Hank Pfister (first round)
2. (Australia) John Alexander (first round)
3. (United States) Tim Wilkison (first round)
4. (Australia) Pat Cash (semifinals)
5. (United States) Mike De Palmer (quarterfinals)
6. (Australia) Rod Frawley (quarterfinals)
7. (United States) Mike Estep (first round)
8. (United States) Jeff Borowiak (second round)

== Draw ==
=== Key ===
- Q = Qualifier
- WC = Wild card
- LL = Lucky loser
- Alt = Alternate
- SE = Special exempt
- PR = Protected ranking
- ITF = ITF entry
- JE = Junior exempt
- w/o = Walkover
- r = Retired
- d = Defaulted
- SR = Special ranking

=== Finals ===
Semifinals
(United States) Mike Bauer	6	7	6
4	(Australia) Pat Cash	7	6	3
(Australia) Broderick Dyke	6	3
(Australia) Chris Johnstone	7	6

Final
(United States) Mike Bauer	4	7	6
(Australia) Chris Johnstone	6	6	2

=== Top half ===
First round
1	(United States) H Pfister	5	2
(United States) M Bauer	7	6
(Australia) C A Miller	6	3	7
(South Africa) E Edwards	4	6	6
(Australia) J Frawley	6	3	4
(Australia) J Fitzgerald	4	6	6
Q	(South Africa) B Mitton	6	6
7	(United States) M Estep	2	4
4	(Australia) P Cash	6	6
Q	(United States) S McCain	3	1
(New Zealand) J Simpson	4	7	7
(United States) S Giammalva Jr.	6	6	5
(United Kingdom) J Smith	6	7
(Australia) C Letcher	3	6
(United Kingdom) R Lewis	4	6	4
6	(Australia) R Frawley	6	3	6

Second round
(United States) M Bauer	6	6
(Australia) C A Miller	3	3
(Australia) J Fitzgerald	4	6	3
(South Africa) B Mitton	6	4	6
4	(Australia) P Cash	6	6
(New Zealand) J Simpson	4	4
(United Kingdom) J Smith	4	3
6	(Australia) R Frawley	6	6

Quarterfinals
(United States) M Bauer	4	7	6
(South Africa) B Mitton	6	5	4
4	(Australia) P Cash	4	7	7
6	(Australia) R Frawley	6	5	6

Semifinals
(United States) M Bauer	6	7	6
4	(Australia) P Cash	7	6	3

=== Bottom half ===
First round
8	(United States) J Borowiak	6	7
(United Kingdom) J Lloyd	2	5
(United States) M Leach	6	3	2
Q	(Australia) G Whitecross	3	6	6
(United States) R Evett	1	4
(New Zealand) B Derlin	6	6
(Australia) B Dyke	7	5	6
3	(United States) T Wilkison	6	7	3
5	(United States) M De Palmer	4	7	6
(Australia) B Drewett	6	6	4
(United States) L Stefanki	6	6	6
(Australia) W Hampson	7	3	7
(Australia) C Johnstone	6	6
Q	(United States) J Canter	3	2
(Australia) P Carter	7	6	7
2	(Australia) J Alexander	5	7	6

Second round
8	(United States) J Borowiak	6	6	6
Q	(Australia) G Whitecross	3	7	7
(New Zealand) B Derlin	6	4	4
(Australia) B Dyke	3	6	6
5	(United States) M De Palmer	6	6
(Australia) W Hampson	4	2
(Australia) C Johnstone	6	6
(Australia) P Carter	4	2

Quarterfinals
Q	(Australia) G Whitecross	2	6
(Australia) B Dyke	6	7
5	(United States) M De Palmer	6	0	2
(Australia) C Johnstone	1	6	6

Semifinals
(Australia) B Dyke	6	3
(Australia) C Johnstone	7	6
