= 1985 South Australian Open – Doubles =

Doubles
- 1985 South Australian Open

Final
- Champion: (Australia) Mark Edmondson (Australia) Kim Warwick
- Runner-up: (Brazil) Nelson Aerts (United States) Tomm Warneke
- Score: 6–4, 6–4

Details
- Draw: 16
- Seeds: 4

Events
Singles	Doubles
- South Australian Open

Mark Edmondson and Kim Warwick won in the final 6–4, 6–4 against Nelson Aerts and Tomm Warneke.

== Seeds ==
1. (Australia) Mark Edmondson / (Australia) Kim Warwick (champion)
2. (Australia) Peter Doohan / (Australia) Brad Drewett (quarterfinal)
3. (Australia) Broderick Dyke / (Australia) Wally Masur (first round)
4. (United Kingdom) C Dowdeswell / (Israel) A Mansdorf (quarterfinal)

== Draw ==
Key

- Q = Qualifier
- WC = Wild card
- LL = Lucky loser
- Alt = Alternate
- ITF = ITF entry
- PR = Protected ranking
- SR = Special ranking
- SE = Special exempt
- JE = Junior exempt
- JR = Junior Accelerator Programme entrant
- CO = College Accelerator Programme entrant
- NG = Next Gen Accelerator Program entrant
- w/o = Walkover
- r = Retired
- d = Defaulted

=== Draw ===
First round
1	(Australia) M Edmondson (Australia) K Warwick	7	6
WC	(Australia) D Cahill (Australia) J Frawley	6	3
(South Africa) C Steyn (South Africa) D Visser	6	6
(Australia) A Emerson (Australia) M Woodforde	3	2
3	(Australia) B Dyke (Australia) W Masur	6	3
(Australia) C Limberger (West Germany) T Meinecke	7	6
(Austria) A Antonitsch (Netherlands) M Schapers	6	6	6
(United States) M Bauer (Netherlands) H Van Boeckel	7	4	6
(Australia) C Miller (Australia) L Warder	3	6	3
(Australia) K Evernden (United States) M Robertson	6	3	6
(United States) L Bourne (United States) L Shiras	5	3
4	(United Kingdom) C Dowdeswell (Israel) A Mansdorf	7	6
(Brazil) N Aerts (United States) T Warneke	7	7
(Sweden) P Carlsson (United States) J Letts	6	6
(Paraguay) F González (United States) R Rudeen	4	4
2	(Australia) P Doohan (Australia) B Drewett	6	6

Quarterfinals
1	(Australia) M Edmondson (Australia) K Warwick	6	7
(South Africa) C Steyn (South Africa) D Visser	2	6
(Australia) C Limberger (West Germany) T Meinecke	3	5
(Austria) A Antonitsch (Netherlands) M Schapers	6	7
(Australia) K Evernden (United States) M Robertson	7	2	6
4	(United Kingdom) C Dowdeswell (Israel) A Mansdorf	6	6	3
(Brazil) N Aerts (United States) T Warneke	6	6	7
2	(Australia) P Doohan (Australia) B Drewett	4	7	6

Semifinals
1	(Australia) M Edmondson (Australia) K Warwick	6	7
(Austria) A Antonitsch (Netherlands) M Schapers	2	6
(Australia) K Evernden (United States) M Robertson	6	2
(Brazil) N Aerts (United States) T Warneke	7	6

Final
1	(Australia) M Edmondson (Australia) K Warwick	6	6
(Brazil) N Aerts (United States) T Warneke	4	4
