= 1981 South Australian Open – Singles =

Singles
- 1981 South Australian Open

Final
- Champion: (Australia) Mark Edmondson
- Runner-up: (Australia) Brad Drewett
- Score: 7–5, 6–2

Details
- Draw: 32
- Seeds: 8

Events
| Singles | Doubles |
- South Australian Open

Fifth-seeded Mark Edmondson won the singles title at the 1981 South Australian Open tennis tournament, defeating Brad Drewett 7–5, 6–2 in the final.

== Seeds ==
1. n/a
2. (Australia) Colin Dibley (first round)
3. (United States) Tim Gullikson (quarterfinals)
4. (New Zealand) Chris Lewis (second round)
5. (Australia) Mark Edmondson (champion)
6. (South Africa) Eddie Edwards (semifinals)
7. (Australia) Syd Ball (semifinals)
8. (Australia) Geoff Masters (first round)

== Draw ==
Key

- Q = Qualifier
- WC = Wild card
- LL = Lucky loser
- Alt = Alternate
- ITF = ITF entry
- PR = Protected ranking
- SR = Special ranking
- SE = Special exempt
- JE = Junior exempt
- JR = Junior Accelerator Programme entrant
- CO = College Accelerator Programme entrant
- NG = Next Gen Accelerator Program entrant
- w/o = Walkover
- r = Retired
- d = Defaulted

=== Finals ===
Semifinals
(Australia) Brad Drewett | 3 | 6 | 6
6 | (South Africa) Eddie Edwards | 6 | 3 | 4
5 | (Australia) Mark Edmondson | 5 | 6 | 6
7 | (Australia) Syd Ball | 7 | 2 | 4

Final
(Australia) Brad Drewett | 5 | 2
5 | (Australia) Mark Edmondson | 7 | 6

=== Top half ===
First round
(Australia) R Case | 7 | 4 | 6
(Australia) P Johnston | 5 | 6 | 3
(Australia) B Drewett | 6 | 7
(United States) R Fisher | 4 | 5
Q | (United States) C Wittus | 7 | 6
(Australia) B Guan | 5 | 3
(Australia) C Johnstone | 6 | 6
8 | (Australia) G Masters | 2 | 2
4 | (New Zealand) C Lewis | 6 | 6
(Australia) P Cash | 3 | 1
(Australia) W Pascoe | 3 | 6 | 6
(United States) J DiLouie | 6 | 2 | 3
(United States) J Gurfein | 6 | 6
(Australia) J James | 4 | 4
(West Germany) U Marten | 7 | 4 | 4
6 | (South Africa) E Edwards | 5 | 6 | 6

Second round
(Australia) R Case | 6 | 2 | 4
(Australia) B Drewett | 3 | 6 | 6
Q | (United States) C Wittus | 1 | 2
(Australia) C Johnstone | 6 | 6
4 | (New Zealand) C Lewis | 4 | 1
(Australia) W Pascoe | 6 | 6
(United States) J Gurfein | 6 | 7 | 5
6 | (South Africa) E Edwards | 7 | 5 | 7

Quarterfinals
(Australia) B Drewett | 6 | 6
(Australia) C Johnstone | 3 | 3
(Australia) W Pascoe | 1 | 4
6 | (South Africa) E Edwards | 6 | 6

Semifinals
(Australia) B Drewett | 3 | 6 | 6
6 | (South Africa) E Edwards | 6 | 3 | 4

=== Bottom half ===
First round
5 | (Australia) M Edmondson | 2 | 7 | 6
Q | (Australia) P Doohan | 6 | 6 | 2
Q | (United States) G Holroyd | 3 | 6 | 6
(Australia) W Masur | 6 | 3 | 2
(Australia) H Hansson | 7 | 2 | 6
(United States) M Hunter | 5 | 6 | 1
(Australia) C Letcher | 6 | 6 | 4
3 | (United States) T Gullikson | 3 | 7 | 6
7 | (Australia) S Ball | 6 | 6
(Australia) C A Miller | 3 | 4
Q | (Philippines) B Sison | 6 | 2 | 6
(Australia) W Hampson | 3 | 6 | 3
(Australia) J Fitzgerald | 6 | 6
(United Kingdom) J Smith | 3 | 4
(Australia) D Collings | 7 | 6
2 | (Australia) C Dibley | 5 | 2

Second round
5 | (Australia) M Edmondson | 2 | 6 | 6
Q | (United States) G Holroyd | 6 | 1 | 2
(Australia) H Hansson | 1 | 5
3 | (United States) T Gullikson | 6 | 7
7 | (Australia) S Ball | 7 | 3 | 7
Q | (Philippines) B Sison | 5 | 6 | 5
(Australia) J Fitzgerald | 6 | 7
(Australia) D Collings | 4 | 6

Quarterfinals
5 | (Australia) M Edmondson | 6 | 7
3 | (United States) T Gullikson | 3 | 6
7 | (Australia) S Ball | 7 | 7
(Australia) J Fitzgerald | 6 | 5

Semifinals
5 | (Australia) M Edmondson | 5 | 6 | 6
7 | (Australia) S Ball | 7 | 2 | 4
