= 1985 South Australian Open – Singles =

Singles
- 1985 South Australian Open

Final
- Champion: (South Africa) Eddie Edwards
- Runner-up: (Australia) Peter Doohan
- Score: 6–2, 6–4

Details
- Draw: 32
- Seeds: 8

Events
Singles	Doubles
← 1984 ·	South Australian Open	· 1987 →

Peter Doohan was the defending champion.

Eddie Edwards won the title, defeating Doohan 6–2, 6–4 in the final.

== Seeds ==
1. n/a
2. (Australia) John Fitzgerald (quarterfinals)
3. (United States) Jonathan Canter (first round)
4. (Israel) Amos Mansdorf (quarterfinals)
5. (United Kingdom) Jeremy Bates (first round)
6. (Sweden) Jonas Svensson (first round)
7. (New Zealand) Kelly Evernden (first round)
8. (Australia) Peter Doohan (final)

== Draw ==
=== Key ===
- Q = Qualifier
- WC = Wild card
- LL = Lucky loser
- Alt = Alternate
- SE = Special exempt
- PR = Protected ranking
- ITF = ITF entry
- JE = Junior exempt
- w/o = Walkover
- r = Retired
- d = Defaulted
- SR = Special ranking

=== Finals ===
Semifinals
(Australia) Wally Masur	4	0^{r}
8	(Australia) Peter Doohan	6	2
Q	(South Africa) Eddie Edwards	7	7
Q	(South Africa) Christo Steyn	6	6

Final
8	(Australia) Peter Doohan	2	4
Q	(South Africa) Eddie Edwards	6	6

=== Top half ===
First round
(Australia) J Frawley	6	7
(Australia) D Cahill	4	6
(United States) M Bauer	3	6
(Australia) W Masur	6	7
Q	(United Kingdom) N Fulwood	7	4	3
WC	(United States) B Scanlon	6	6	6
(Argentina) R Saad	6	7
5	(United Kingdom) J Bates	3	6
4	(Israel) A Mansdorf	6	6	6
(Netherlands) H van Boeckel	7	4	4
(West Germany) R Osterthun	7	3	1
(Netherlands) M Schapers	6	6	6
Q	(Australia) A Emerson	2	3
(Australia) B Drewett	6	6
(Paraguay) F González	4	6
8	(Australia) P Doohan	6	7

Second round
(Australia) J Frawley	7	4	3
(Australia) W Masur	6	6	6
WC	(United States) B Scanlon	3	5
(Argentina) R Saad	6	7
4	(Israel) A Mansdorf	3	6	6
(Netherlands) M Schapers	6	2	1
(Australia) B Drewett	3	3
8	(Australia) P Doohan	6	6

Quarterfinals
(Australia) W Masur	0	6	7
(Argentina) R Saad	6	4	6
4	(Israel) A Mansdorf	3	4
8	(Australia) P Doohan	6	6

Semifinals
(Australia) W Masur	4	0^{r}
8	(Australia) P Doohan	6	2

=== Bottom half ===
First round
7	(New Zealand) K Evernden	6	2	6
(United States) M Flur	3	6	2
Q	(South Africa) E Edwards	6	6
WC	(Australia) S Barr	0	4
(South Africa) D Visser	3	4
(United States) L Shiras	6	6
WC	(Australia) M Woodforde	6	6
3	(United States) J Canter	4	2
6	(Sweden) J Svensson	4	2
Q	(South Africa) C Steyn	6	6
(United States) L Bourne	4	7	4
(Brazil) N Aerts	6	5	6
(United Kingdom) C Dowdeswell	3	6	6
(France) T Benhabiles	6	4	7
(Sweden) P Carlsson	5	5
2	(Australia) J Fitzgerald	7	7

Second round
7	(New Zealand) K Evernden	6	3	1
Q	(South Africa) E Edwards	2	6	6
(United States) L Shiras	7	7
WC	(Australia) M Woodforde	5	6
Q	(South Africa) C Steyn	6	7
(Brazil) N Aerts	2	5
(France) T Benhabiles	7	2	4
2	(Australia) J Fitzgerald	6	6	6

Quarterfinals
Q	(South Africa) E Edwards	6	6
(United States) L Shiras	2	2
Q	(South Africa) C Steyn	3	7	6
2	(Australia) J Fitzgerald	6	6	2

Semifinals
Q	(South Africa) E Edwards	7	7
Q	(South Africa) C Steyn	6	6
