= 1988 South Australian Open – Doubles =

Doubles
- 1988 South Australian Open

Final
- Champions: (Australia) Darren Cahill (Australia) Mark Kratzmann
- Runners-up: (Australia) Carl Limberger (Australia) Mark Woodforde
- Score: 4–6, 6–2, 7–5

Events
Singles	Doubles
← 1987 ·	South Australian Open	· 1989 →

Ivan Lendl and Bill Scanlon were the defending champions, but did not participate this year.

Darren Cahill and Mark Kratzmann won the title, defeating Carl Limberger and Mark Woodforde 4–6, 6–2, 7–5 in the final.

== Seeds ==
1. (Australia) Peter Doohan / (Australia) Laurie Warder (semifinals)
2. (Australia) Darren Cahill / (Australia) Mark Kratzmann (champions)
3. (Australia) John Fitzgerald / (Australia) Wally Masur (semifinals)
4. (Australia) Carl Limberger / (Australia) Mark Woodforde (final)

== Draw ==
=== Key ===
- Q = Qualifier
- WC = Wild card
- LL = Lucky loser
- Alt = Alternate
- SE = Special exempt
- PR = Protected ranking
- ITF = ITF entry
- JE = Junior exempt
- w/o = Walkover
- r = Retired
- d = Defaulted
- SR = Special ranking

=== Draw ===
First round
1	(Australia) P Doohan (Australia) L Warder	3	6	7
(United States) P Chamberlin (Netherlands) M Schapers	6	3	6
WC	(Australia) J Stoltenberg (Australia) T Woodbridge	3	7	5
(Australia) D Macpherson (Australia) S Youl	6	6	7
4	(Australia) C Limberger (Australia) M Woodforde	6	6
(Australia) P Carter (United States) J Levine	4	3
(Australia) S Barr (Australia) B Drewett	6	6
(Australia) R Fricker (Australia) G Pfitzner	4	4
(United Kingdom) N Fulwood (United States) D MacBride	5	1
(United States) R Schmidt (United States) T Siegel	7	6
(United States) P Palandjian (United States) B Schultz	6	1
3	(Australia) J Fitzgerald (Australia) W Masur	7	6
(United States) J Rive (United States) L Scott	7	3	3
(United States) M Anger (United States) CB Cox	6	6	6
(West Germany) A Mronz (West Germany) C Saceanu	5	3
2	(Australia) D Cahill (Australia) M Kratzmann	7	6

Quarterfinals
1	(Australia) P Doohan (Australia) L Warder	7	6
(Australia) D Macpherson (Australia) S Youl	6	3
4	(Australia) C Limberger (Australia) M Woodforde	6	3	6
(Australia) S Barr (Australia) B Drewett	4	6	2
(United States) R Schmidt (United States) T Siegel	3	3
3	(Australia) J Fitzgerald (Australia) W Masur	6	6
(United States) M Anger (United States) CB Cox	6	0
2	(Australia) D Cahill (Australia) M Kratzmann	7	6

Semifinals
1	(Australia) P Doohan (Australia) L Warder	7	2	4
4	(Australia) C Limberger (Australia) M Woodforde	5	6	6
3	(Australia) J Fitzgerald (Australia) W Masur	6	4
2	(Australia) D Cahill (Australia) M Kratzmann	7	6

Final
4	(Australia) C Limberger (Australia) M Woodforde	6	2	5
2	(Australia) D Cahill (Australia) M Kratzmann	4	6	7
