= 1988 South Australian Open – Singles =

Singles
- 1988 South Australian Open

Final
- Champion: (Australia) Mark Woodforde
- Runner-up: (Australia) Wally Masur
- Score: 6–2, 6–4

Details
- Draw: 32
- Seeds: 8

Events
Singles	Doubles
← 1987 ·	South Australian Open	· 1989 →

Mark Woodforde defeated Wally Masur 6–2, 6–4 to secure the title.

== Seeds ==
1. (Australia) Wally Masur (final)
2. (Netherlands) Michiel Schapers (first round)
3. (Australia) Mark Woodforde (champion)
4. (Australia) Peter Doohan (first round)
5. (Australia) John Fitzgerald (semifinals)
6. (Australia) Darren Cahill (first round)
7. (West Germany) Christian Saceanu (first round)
8. (United States) Matt Anger (first round)

== Draw ==
=== Key ===
- Q = Qualifier
- WC = Wild card
- LL = Lucky loser
- Alt = Alternate
- SE = Special exempt
- PR = Protected ranking
- ITF = ITF entry
- JE = Junior exempt
- w/o = Walkover
- r = Retired
- d = Defaulted
- SR = Special ranking

=== Finals ===
Semifinals
1	(Australia) Wally Masur	6	6
5	(Australia) John Fitzgerald	1	1
3	(Australia) Mark Woodforde	6	6
WC	(Australia) Johan Anderson	1	4

Final
1	(Australia) Wally Masur	2	4
3	(Australia) Mark Woodforde	6	6

=== Top half ===
First round
1	(Australia) W Masur	6	6
(Australia) P Carter	2	1
(Australia) P McNamee	6	6
(United States) C Cox	1	2
(United States) J Levine	6	4
(Australia) C Limberger	7	6
Q	(Australia) R Rasheed	6	3	7
7	(West Germany) C Saceanu	2	6	5
4	(Australia) P Doohan	1	2
(United States) B Schultz	6	6
(Australia) S Youl	6	6	7
(United States) L Scott	7	4	5
WC	(Australia) R Fromberg	6	7
(Australia) B Drewett	4	6
(Australia) M Kratzmann	5	3
5	(Australia) J Fitzgerald	7	6

Second round
1	(Australia) W Masur	6	6
(Australia) P McNamee	2	3
(Australia) C Limberger	6	6	6
Q	(Australia) R Rasheed	7	4	7
(United States) B Schultz	7	6	6
(Australia) S Youl	5	7	3
WC	(Australia) R Fromberg	7	5	2
5	(Australia) J Fitzgerald	6	7	6

Quarterfinals
1	(Australia) W Masur	6	4	6
Q	(Australia) R Rasheed	1	6	4
(United States) B Schultz	4	7	4
5	(Australia) J Fitzgerald	6	5	6

Semifinals
1	(Australia) W Masur	6	6
5	(Australia) J Fitzgerald	1	1

=== Bottom half ===
First round
6	(Australia) D Cahill	7	5	2
(West Germany) P Baur	6	7	6
Q	(United States) R Schmidt	4	7	6
(United States) P Chamberlin	6	6	7
(Netherlands) T Nijssen	4	3
(South Africa) B Moir	6	6
Q	(Australia) B Roe	2	5
3	(Australia) M Woodforde	6	7
8	(United States) M Anger	4	3
(Italy) G Pozzi	6	6
WC	(Australia) J Anderson	6	2	6
(West Germany) A Mronz	2	6	2
(United States) J Rive	6	7
(South Africa) E Edwards	1	6
Q	(Australia) J Stoltenberg	6	6	6
2	(Netherlands) M Schapers	3	7	2

Second round
(West Germany) P Baur	7	6
(United States) P Chamberlin	6	1
(South Africa) B Moir	4	3
3	(Australia) M Woodforde	6	6
(Italy) G Pozzi	4	6	2
WC	(Australia) J Anderson	6	2	6
(United States) J Rive	7	2	6
Q	(Australia) J Stoltenberg	5	6	2

Quarterfinals
(West Germany) P Baur	4	6	1
3	(Australia) M Woodforde	6	1	6
WC	(Australia) J Anderson	7	7
(United States) J Rive	5	5

Semifinals
3	(Australia) M Woodforde	6	6
WC	(Australia) J Anderson	1	4
