= 1983 South Australian Open – Singles =

Singles
- 1983 South Australian Open

Final
- Champion: (United States) Mike Bauer
- Runner-up: (Czechoslovakia) Miloslav Mečíř
- Score: 3–6, 6–4, 6–1

Details
- Draw: 32
- Seeds: 8

Events
Singles	Doubles
← 1982 ·	South Australian Open	· 1984 →

Mike Bauer successfully defended his title, defeating Miloslav Mečíř 3–6, 6–4, 6–1 in the final.

== Seeds ==
1. (New Zealand) Chris Lewis (quarterfinals)
2. (Australia) Pat Cash (quarterfinals)
3. (Australia) Paul McNamee (semifinals)
4. (Australia) John Fitzgerald (second round)
5. (United States) Mike Bauer (champion)
6. (United States) Chip Hooper (quarterfinals)
7. (Australia) Wally Masur (first round)
8. (Australia) Brad Drewett (semifinals)

== Draw ==
=== Key ===
- Q = Qualifier
- WC = Wild card
- LL = Lucky loser
- Alt = Alternate
- SE = Special exempt
- PR = Protected ranking
- ITF = ITF entry
- JE = Junior exempt
- w/o = Walkover
- r = Retired
- d = Defaulted
- SR = Special ranking

=== Finals ===
Semifinals
(Czechoslovakia) Miloslav Mečíř	6	6
3	(Australia) Paul McNamee	2	3
8	(Australia) Brad Drewett	6	4
5	(United States) Mike Bauer	7	6

Final
(Czechoslovakia) Miloslav Mečíř	6	4	1
5	(United States) Mike Bauer	3	6	6

=== Top half ===
First round
1	(New Zealand) C Lewis	6	6
(Australia) J Frawley	3	4
Q	(New Zealand) B Derlin	1	2
(Australia) P Doohan	6	6
(France) J Vanier	3	6	3
(Australia) S Youl	6	3	6
(Czechoslovakia) M Mečíř	6	3	6
7	(Australia) W Masur	4	6	3
3	(Australia) P McNamee	6	6	7
(United States) S Brawley	4	7	5
Q	(United Kingdom) J Smith	6	5	6
(Australia) B Dyke	1	7	4
(United States) J Canter	6	2	6
(Australia) C Johnstone	4	6	3
(Australia) J Alexander	6	6
6	(United States) C Hooper	7	7

Second round
1	(New Zealand) C Lewis	7	6
(Australia) P Doohan	6	4
(Australia) S Youl	4	4
(Czechoslovakia) M Mečíř	6	6
3	(Australia) P McNamee	6	7
Q	(United Kingdom) J Smith	3	6
(United States) J Canter	6	2
6	(United States) C Hooper	7	6

Quarterfinals
1	(New Zealand) C Lewis	5	7	4
(Czechoslovakia) M Mečíř	7	6	6
3	(Australia) P McNamee	6	6	6
6	(United States) C Hooper	7	4	3

Semifinals
(Czechoslovakia) M Mečíř	6	6
3	(Australia) P McNamee	2	3

=== Bottom half ===
First round
8	(Australia) B Drewett	6	6
Q	(Australia) A Lane	4	4
Q	(Australia) G Whitecross	7	7
(Australia) C Fancutt	6	5
(United States) L Shiras	6	7
(Australia) R Frawley	4	6
(United States) A Andrews	6	6	4
4	(Australia) J Fitzgerald	4	7	6
5	(United States) M Bauer	6	6
(United States) M Brunnberg	3	2
(New Zealand) D Mustard	6	6
(Australia) C A Miller	4	2
(United States) J Austin	2	2
(France) L Courteau	6	6
(United States) L Bourne	4	3
2	(Australia) P Cash	6	6

Second round
8	(Australia) B Drewett	6	6
Q	(Australia) G Whitecross	3	4
(United States) L Shiras	6	6	7
4	(Australia) J Fitzgerald	4	7	6
5	(United States) M Bauer	6	6
(New Zealand) D Mustard	4	4
(France) L Courteau	2	2
2	(Australia) P Cash	6	6

Quarterfinals
8	(Australia) B Drewett	7	6
(United States) L Shiras	5	4
5	(United States) M Bauer	7	7
2	(Australia) P Cash	6	5

Semifinals
8	(Australia) B Drewett	6	4
5	(United States) M Bauer	7	6
