= 1987 South Australian Open – Singles =

Singles
- 1987 South Australian Open

Final
- Champion: (Australia) Wally Masur
- Runner-up: (United States) Bill Scanlon
- Score: 6–4, 7–6

Details
- Draw: 32
- Seeds: 8

Events
Singles	Doubles
← 1985 ·	South Australian Open	· 1988 →

Wally Masur defeated Bill Scanlon 6–4, 7–6 to secure the title.

== Seeds ==
1. (India) Ramesh Krishnan (quarterfinals)
2. (Israel) Amos Mansdorf (quarterfinals)
3. n/a
4. (United States) Matt Anger (second round)
5. (South Africa) Eddie Edwards (first round)
6. (Australia) Broderick Dyke (second round)
7. (Australia) Wally Masur (champion)
8. (Nigeria) Nduka Odizor (semifinals)

== Draw ==
=== Key ===
- Q = Qualifier
- WC = Wild card
- LL = Lucky loser
- Alt = Alternate
- SE = Special exempt
- PR = Protected ranking
- ITF = ITF entry
- JE = Junior exempt
- w/o = Walkover
- r = Retired
- d = Defaulted
- SR = Special ranking

=== Finals ===
Semifinals
8	(Nigeria) Nduka Odizor	7	4	4
(United States) Bill Scanlon	6	6	6
(Netherlands) Michiel Schapers	4	0
7	(Australia) Wally Masur	6	6

Final
(United States) Bill Scanlon	4	6
7	(Australia) Wally Masur	6	7

=== Top half ===
First round
1	(India) R Krishnan	4	6	6
(Australia) M Kratzmann	6	3	3
(Sweden) J Carlsson	6	7	6
(Australia) D Cahill	7	6	3
(United States) B Pearce	5	3
WC	(Australia) A Lane	7	6
WC	(Australia) P Carter	6	4	3
8	(Nigeria) N Odizor	2	6	6
LL	(New Zealand) B Derlin	6	6
Q	(Australia) S Barr	3	4
(United States) B Scanlon	4	6	6
(Argentina) J Frana	6	4	1
Q	(Australia) D Tyson	2	1
(Canada) G Michibata	6	6
Q	(United Kingdom) J Bates	3	4
6	(Australia) B Dyke	6	6

Second round
1	(India) R Krishnan	6	6
(Sweden) J Carlsson	2	2
WC	(Australia) A Lane	2	6
8	(Nigeria) N Odizor	6	7
LL	(New Zealand) B Derlin	1^{r}
(United States) B Scanlon	4
(Canada) G Michibata	6	6
6	(Australia) B Dyke	2	3

Quarterfinals
1	(India) R Krishnan	3	2
8	(Nigeria) N Odizor	6	6
(United States) B Scanlon	7	7
(Canada) G Michibata	6	5

Semifinals
8	(Nigeria) N Odizor	7	4	4
(United States) B Scanlon	6	6	6

=== Bottom half ===
First round
5	(South Africa) E Edwards	4	4
(Australia) J Fitzgerald	6	6
(United States) D Goldie	7	6
Q	(Israel) G Bloom	6	4
WC	(Australia) S Youl	6	5
(Netherlands) M Schapers	7	7
LL	(Australia) B Drewett	2	6	6
4	(United States) M Anger	6	3	7
7	(Australia) W Masur	6	6
(United States) K Jones	4	2
(United States) B Schultz	4	7	2
(Australia) M Woodforde	6	5	6
(United States) R Matuszewski	6	5	3
(United States) J Levine	3	7	6
(Australia) P Doohan	6	6	6
2	(Israel) A Mansdorf	7	2	7

Second round
(Australia) J Fitzgerald	7	7
(United States) D Goldie	5	5
(Netherlands) M Schapers	7	6
4	(United States) M Anger	5	3
7	(Australia) W Masur	3	7	7
(Australia) M Woodforde	6	6	6
(United States) J Levine	6	1	3
2	(Israel) A Mansdorf	4	6	6

Quarterfinals
(Australia) J Fitzgerald	6	4
(Netherlands) M Schapers	7	6
7	(Australia) W Masur	6	6
2	(Israel) A Mansdorf	2	4

Semifinals
(Netherlands) M Schapers	4	0
7	(Australia) W Masur	6	6
