= 1985 South Australian Open =

- Date: 16–22 December
- Edition: 85th
- Category: Grand Prix
- Draw: 32S / 16D
- Prize money: $80,000
- Surface: Grass / outdoor
- Location: Adelaide, Australia

Champions

Singles
- (South Africa) Eddie Edwards

Doubles
- (Australia) Mark Edmondson / (Australia) Kim Warwick
- South Australian Open

The 1985 South Australian Open was a men's Grand Prix tennis tournament held in Adelaide, Australia, on outdoor grass courts. The tournament took place from 16 to 22 December, with unseeded qualifier Eddie Edwards claiming the singles title.

== Finals ==
=== Singles ===
(South Africa) Eddie Edwards defeated (Australia) Peter Doohan 6–2, 6–4

- It was Edwards' only singles title of the year.

=== Doubles ===
(Australia) Mark Edmondson / (Australia) Kim Warwick defeated (Brazil) Nelson Aerts / (United States) Tomm Warneke 6–4, 6–4
