= 1988 South Australian Open =

- Date: 28 December 1987 – 5 January 1988
- Edition: 44th Australian Hard Court Championships; 87th South Australian Open
- Category: Grand Prix circuit
- Draw: 32S / 16D
- Prize money: $93,400
- Surface: Hard / outdoor
- Location: Adelaide, Australia
- Venue: Memorial Drive

Champions

Singles
- (Australia) Mark Woodforde

Doubles
- (Australia) Darren Cahill / (Australia) Mark Kratzmann
| ← 1987 · | South Australian Open | · 1989 → |

The 1988 South Australian Open also known for this event as the Australian Hard Court Championships was a Grand Prix tennis circuit tournament held at Memorial Drive in Adelaide, Australia. The tournament was held from 28 December 1987 to 5 January 1988. Third-seeded Mark Woodforde won the singles title.

== Finals ==
=== Singles ===
(Australia) Mark Woodforde defeated (Australia) Wally Masur 6–2, 6–4

- It was Woodforde's first singles title of the year and the second of his career.

=== Doubles ===
(Australia) Darren Cahill / (Australia) Mark Kratzmann defeated (Australia) Carl Limberger / (Australia) Mark Woodforde 4–6, 6–2, 7–5
