= 1989 South Australian Open – Singles =

Singles
- 1989 South Australian Open

Final
- Champion: (Australia) Mark Woodforde
- Runner-up: (West Germany) Patrik Kühnen
- Score: 7–5, 1–6, 7–5

Details
- Draw: 32
- Seeds: 8

Events
Singles	Doubles
← 1988 ·	South Australian Open	· 1990 →

Mark Woodforde was the defending champion and won in the final 7–5, 1–6, 7–5 against Patrik Kühnen.

== Seeds ==
1. (Soviet Union) Andrei Chesnokov (first round)
2. (Australia) Darren Cahill (first round)
3. (Socialist Federal Republic of Yugoslavia) Slobodan Živojinović (first round)
4. (Australia) Mark Woodforde (champion)
5. (Australia) Wally Masur (quarterfinals)
6. (Australia) John Frawley (first round)
7. (West Germany) Patrik Kühnen (final)
8. (Australia) Jason Stoltenberg (second round)

== Draw ==
=== Key ===
- Q = Qualifier
- WC = Wild card
- LL = Lucky loser
- Alt = Alternate
- SE = Special exempt
- PR = Protected ranking
- ITF = ITF entry
- JE = Junior exempt
- w/o = Walkover
- r = Retired
- d = Defaulted
- SR = Special ranking

=== Finals ===
Semifinals
(Soviet Union) Alexander Volkov	2	5
4	(Australia) Mark Woodforde	6	7
(Finland) Veli Paloheimo	6	4	3
7	(West Germany) Patrik Kühnen	4	6	6

Final
4	(Australia) Mark Woodforde	7	1	7
7	(West Germany) Patrik Kühnen	5	6	5

=== Top half ===
First round
1	(Soviet Union) A Chesnokov	3	1
(Soviet Union) A Volkov	6	6
(Soviet Union) A Olhovskiy	1	6	6
Q	(Czechoslovakia) L Němeček	6	3	2
(United States) P Sampras	6	6
(United Kingdom) J Bates	2	3
(Australia) B Drewett	3	2
8	(Australia) J Stoltenberg	6	6
4	(Australia) M Woodforde	6	6
Q	(France) G Raoux	4	4
Q	(West Germany) A Mronz	3	6
WC	(Soviet Union) A Cherkasov	6	7
(Australia) B Dyke	7	4	4
(Australia) J Anderson	5	6	6
LL	(Socialist Federal Republic of Yugoslavia) G Ivanišević	7	6	6
6	(Australia) J Frawley	5	7	4

Second round
(Soviet Union) A Volkov	4	6	6
(Soviet Union) A Olhovskiy	6	3	4
(United States) P Sampras	6	6
8	(Australia) J Stoltenberg	3	2
4	(Australia) M Woodforde	6	7
WC	(Soviet Union) A Cherkasov	3	6
(Australia) J Anderson	1	7	2
LL	(Socialist Federal Republic of Yugoslavia) G Ivanišević	6	6	6

Quarterfinals
(Soviet Union) A Volkov	2	6	6
(United States) P Sampras	6	1	4
4	(Australia) M Woodforde	7	3	6
LL	(Socialist Federal Republic of Yugoslavia) G Ivanišević	5	6	2

Semifinals
(Soviet Union) A Volkov	2	5
4	(Australia) M Woodforde	6	7

=== Bottom half ===
First round
5	(Australia) W Masur	6	7
(United States) G Layendecker	4	5
WC	(Australia) T Woodbridge	7	6
LL	(Australia) P Carter	6	4
Q	(Sweden) J Apell	3	6	3
WC	(Australia) R Rasheed	6	1	6
(Finland) V Paloheimo	6	6
3	(Socialist Federal Republic of Yugoslavia) S Živojinović	1	1
7	(West Germany) P Kühnen	2	7	6
(France) O Delaître	6	6	2
(Netherlands) M Koevermans	6	6
(Australia) S Youl	4	2
(Netherlands) T Nijssen	5	6	1
(United Kingdom) N Broad	7	3	6
(Australia) M Kratzmann	7	6
2	(Australia) D Cahill	6	1

Second round
5	(Australia) W Masur	6	6
WC	(Australia) T Woodbridge	2	1
WC	(Australia) R Rasheed	1	3
(Finland) V Paloheimo	6	6
7	(West Germany) P Kühnen	6	6
(Netherlands) M Koevermans	4	4
(United Kingdom) N Broad	3	5
(Australia) M Kratzmann	6	7

Quarterfinals
5	(Australia) W Masur	4	6	3
(Finland) V Paloheimo	6	4	6
7	(West Germany) P Kühnen	6	3	6
(Australia) M Kratzmann	4	6	3

Semifinals
(Finland) V Paloheimo	6	4	3
7	(West Germany) P Kühnen	4	6	6
