= 1974 South Australian Tennis Championships – Men's singles =

Men's singles
- 1974 South Australian Tennis Championships

Final
- Champion: (Sweden) Björn Borg
- Runner-up: (Australia) Onny Parun
- Score: 6–4, 6–4, 3–6, 6–2

Events
Singles	men	women
Doubles	men	women
← 1972 ·	South Australian Tennis Championships	· 1975 →

Björn Borg won the title, defeating Onny Parun 6–4, 6–4, 3–6, 6–2 in the final.

== Draw ==
=== Key ===
- Q = Qualifier
- WC = Wild card
- LL = Lucky loser
- Alt = Alternate
- SE = Special exempt
- PR = Protected ranking
- ITF = ITF entry
- JE = Junior exempt
- w/o = Walkover
- r = Retired
- d = Defaulted
- SR = Special ranking

=== Finals ===
Semifinals
(Sweden) Björn Borg	6	6
(Australia) Colin Dibley	4	4
(Soviet Union) Alex Metreveli	3	4
(New Zealand) Onny Parun	6	6

Final
(Sweden) Björn Borg	6	6	3	6
(New Zealand) Onny Parun	4	4	6	2

=== Section 1 ===
First round
(Sweden) Björn Borg	6	6
(United States) Mike Machette	1	1
(Australia) Colin Dibley	5	6	6
(Sweden) Kjell Johansson	7	2	3
(Australia) Bob Giltinan	6	6	6
(France) Patrice Beust	7	0	2

Quarterfinals
(Sweden) Björn Borg	6	6
(West Germany) Ulrich Marten	1	1
(Australia) Colin Dibley	7	4	9
(Australia) Bob Giltinan	6	6	7

Semifinals
(Sweden) Björn Borg	6	6
(Australia) Colin Dibley	4	4

=== Section 2 ===
First round
(Australia) Cliff Letcher	6	6	8
(Australia) Mal Anderson	2	7	6
(Soviet Union) Alex Metreveli	6	3	6
(Socialist Federal Republic of Yugoslavia) Nikola Špear	2	6	2
(New Zealand) Onny Parun	6	6	6
(West Germany) Harald Elschenbroich	7	2	2
(West Germany) Ulrich Pinner	6	6
(West Germany) Rolf Gehring	3	3

Quarterfinals
(Australia) Cliff Letcher	7	5	7
(Soviet Union) Alex Metreveli	6	7	9
(New Zealand) Onny Parun	6	6
(West Germany) Ulrich Pinner	2	4

Semifinals
(Soviet Union) Alex Metreveli	3	4
(New Zealand) Onny Parun	6	6
