= 1984 South Australian Open – Doubles =

Doubles
- 1984 South Australian Open

Final
- Champions: (Australia) Broderick Dyke (Australia) Wally Masur
- Runners-up: (Australia) Peter Doohan (South Africa) Brian Levine
- Score: 4–6, 7–5, 6–1

Events
Singles	Doubles
- South Australian Open

Craig A. Miller and Eric Sherbeck were the defending champions, but lost in the quarterfinals this year.

Broderick Dyke and Wally Masur won the title, defeating Peter Doohan and Brian Levine 4–6, 7–5, 6–1 in the final.

== Seeds ==
1. (Australia) John Alexander / (Australia) John Fitzgerald (first round)
2. (Australia) Broderick Dyke / (Australia) Wally Masur (champions)
3. (Australia) Peter Doohan / (South Africa) Brian Levine (final)
4. (Australia) David Graham / (Australia) Laurie Warder (semifinals)

== Draw ==
Key

- Q = Qualifier
- WC = Wild card
- LL = Lucky loser
- Alt = Alternate
- ITF = ITF entry
- PR = Protected ranking
- SR = Special ranking
- SE = Special exempt
- JE = Junior exempt
- JR = Junior Accelerator Programme entrant
- CO = College Accelerator Programme entrant
- NG = Next Gen Accelerator Program entrant
- w/o = Walkover
- r = Retired
- d = Defaulted

=== Draw ===
First round
1	(Australia) J Alexander (Australia) J Fitzgerald	6	4	6
(Australia) J Frawley (New Zealand) R Simpson	1	6	7
(United States) G Layendecker (United States) D Saltz	7	7
(Australia) D Cahill (Australia) P Carter	6	6
3	(Australia) P Doohan (South Africa) B Levine	7	3	7
(United States) CB Cox (Switzerland) J Hlasek	6	6	6
(Australia) B Drewett (Australia) M Kratzmann	6	6	3
(Australia) C Limberger (Australia) M Woodforde	7	4	6
(United States) J Mattke (United States) H Sands	6	6	7
(United Kingdom) J Smith (United States) E Van't Hof	4	7	6
(West Germany) S Hermann (Netherlands) H van Boeckel	2	4
4	(Australia) D Graham (Australia) L Warder	6	6
(United Kingdom) C Dowdeswell (South Africa) C van Rensburg	6	3	4
(Australia) C Miller (United States) E Sherbeck	2	6	6
(United States) M Bauer (United States) S McCain	6	6	5
2	(Australia) B Dyke (Australia) W Masur	7	4	7

Quarterfinals
(Australia) J Frawley (New Zealand) R Simpson	3	7	4
(United States) G Layendecker (United States) D Saltz	6	5	6
3	(Australia) P Doohan (South Africa) B Levine	6	6
(Australia) C Limberger (Australia) M Woodforde	3	3
(United States) J Mattke (United States) H Sands	3	3
4	(Australia) D Graham (Australia) L Warder	6	6
(Australia) C Miller (United States) E Sherbeck	4	4
2	(Australia) B Dyke (Australia) W Masur	6	6

Semifinals
(United States) G Layendecker (United States) D Saltz	6	3	4
3	(Australia) P Doohan (South Africa) B Levine	4	6	6
4	(Australia) D Graham (Australia) L Warder	4	4
2	(Australia) B Dyke (Australia) W Masur	6	6

Final
3	(Australia) P Doohan (South Africa) B Levine	6	5	1
2	(Australia) B Dyke (Australia) W Masur	4	7	6
