= 1989 South Australian Open – Doubles =

Doubles
- 1989 South Australian Open

Final
- Champions: (United Kingdom) Neil Broad (South Africa) Stefan Kruger
- Runners-up: (Australia) Mark Kratzmann (United States) Glenn Layendecker
- Score: 6–2, 7–6

Events
Singles	Doubles
← 1988 ·	South Australian Open	· 1990 →

Darren Cahill and Mark Kratzmann were the defending champions but they competed with different partners that year, Cahill with Mark Woodforde and Kratzmann with Glenn Layendecker.

Cahill and Woodforde lost in the semifinals to Neil Broad and Stefan Kruger.

Kratzmann and Layendecker lost in the final 6–2, 7–6 against Broad and Kruger.

== Seeds ==
1. (Australia) Darren Cahill / (Australia) Mark Woodforde (semifinals)
2. (Australia) Brad Drewett / (Australia) Wally Masur (first round)
3. (Australia) Broderick Dyke / (Netherlands) Tom Nijssen (semifinals)
4. (West Germany) Patrik Kühnen / (West Germany) Udo Riglewski (first round)

== Draw ==
=== Key ===
- Q = Qualifier
- WC = Wild card
- LL = Lucky loser
- Alt = Alternate
- SE = Special exempt
- PR = Protected ranking
- ITF = ITF entry
- JE = Junior exempt
- w/o = Walkover
- r = Retired
- d = Defaulted
- SR = Special ranking

First round
1	(Australia) D Cahill (Australia) M Woodforde	4	6	6
(Australia) J Stoltenberg (Australia) T Woodbridge	6	3	4
(France) O Delaître (West Germany) T Theine	4	5
(Australia) R Barlow (Netherlands) M Koevermans	6	7
4	(West Germany) P Kühnen (West Germany) U Riglewski	3	3
(United Kingdom) N Broad (South Africa) S Kruger	6	6
(Australia) D Macpherson (Australia) S Youl	6	6
(Sweden) J Apell (Sweden) M Tideman	3	2
(West Germany) A Mronz (Czechoslovakia) C Suk	3	4
(Australia) S Barr (Australia) R Rasheed	6	6
(Socialist Federal Republic of Yugoslavia) I Flego (Socialist Federal Republic of Yugoslavia) G Ivanišević	4	4
3	(Australia) B Dyke (Netherlands) T Nijssen	6	6
(Australia) J Anderson (Australia) J Morgan	3	6
(Soviet Union) A Olhovskiy (Soviet Union) A Volkov	6	7
(Australia) M Kratzmann (United States) G Layendecker	4	7	6
2	(Australia) B Drewett (Australia) W Masur	6	6	1

Quarterfinals
1	(Australia) D Cahill (Australia) M Woodforde	6	1	6
(Australia) R Barlow (Netherlands) M Koevermans	1	6	1
(United Kingdom) N Broad (South Africa) S Kruger	6	6
(Australia) D Macpherson (Australia) S Youl	4	3
(Australia) S Barr (Australia) R Rasheed	3	6
3	(Australia) B Dyke (Netherlands) T Nijssen	6	7
(Soviet Union) A Olhovskiy (Soviet Union) A Volkov	7	3	2
(Australia) M Kratzmann (United States) G Layendecker	6	6	6

Semifinals
1	(Australia) D Cahill (Australia) M Woodforde	4	3
(United Kingdom) N Broad (South Africa) S Kruger	6	6
3	(Australia) B Dyke (Netherlands) T Nijssen	4	4
(Australia) M Kratzmann (United States) G Layendecker	6	6

Final
(United Kingdom) N Broad (South Africa) S Kruger	6	7
(Australia) M Kratzmann (United States) G Layendecker	2	6
