= 1984 South Australian Open =

- Date: 17–23 December
- Edition: 84th
- Category: Grand Prix
- Draw: 32S / 16D
- Prize money: $75,000
- Surface: Grass
- Location: Adelaide, Australia

Champions

Singles
- (Australia) Peter Doohan

Doubles
- (Australia) Broderick Dyke / (Australia) Wally Masur
- South Australian Open

The 1984 South Australian Open was a men's professional tennis tournament held in Adelaide, Australia and played on outdoor grass courts. The event was part of the 1984 Grand Prix circuit. It was the 84th edition of the tournament and was held from 17 to 23 December 1984. Unseeded Peter Doohan won the singles title.

== Finals ==
=== Singles ===
(Australia) Peter Doohan defeated (Netherlands) Huub van Boeckel 1–6, 6–1, 6–4

- It was Dohaan's only singles title of his career.

=== Doubles ===
(Australia) Broderick Dyke / (Australia) Wally Masur defeated (Australia) Peter Doohan / (South Africa) Brian Levine 4–6, 7–5, 6–1
