= 1981 South Australian Open =

- Date: 5–11 January
- Edition: 79th
- Category: Grand Prix
- Draw: 32S / 16D
- Prize money: $50,000
- Surface: Grass
- Location: Adelaide, Australia
- Venue: Memorial Drive

Champions

Singles
- (Australia) Mark Edmondson

Doubles
- (Australia) Colin Dibley / (Australia) John James
- South Australian Open

The 1981 South Australian Open was a men's Association of Tennis Professionals tennis tournament held on outdoor grass courts at Memorial Drive in Adelaide, Australia that was part of the 1981 Volvo Grand Prix circuit. It was the 79th edition of the tournament and was held from 5 January until 11 January 1981. Fifth-seeded Mark Edmondson won the singles title.

== Finals ==
=== Singles ===
(Australia) Mark Edmondson defeated (Australia) Brad Drewett 7–5, 6–2

- It was Edmondson's 1st title of the year and the 14th of his career.

=== Doubles ===
(Australia) Colin Dibley / (Australia) John James defeated (United States) Craig Edwards / (South Africa) Eddie Edwards 6–3, 6–4

- It was Dibley's only title of the year and the 21st of his career. It was James's only title of the year and the 2nd of his career.
