= 1984 South Australian Open – Singles =

Singles
- 1984 South Australian Open

Final
- Champion: (Australia) Peter Doohan
- Runner-up: (Netherlands) Huub van Boeckel
- Score: 1–6, 6–1, 6–4

Details
- Draw: 32
- Seeds: 8

Events
Singles	Doubles
← 1983 ·	South Australian Open	· 1985 →

Mike Bauer was the defending champion, but lost in the semifinals this year.

Peter Doohan won the title, defeating Huub van Boeckel 1–6, 6–1, 6–4 in the final.

== Seeds ==
1. (United States) Mike Bauer (semifinals)
2. (United States) Tim Mayotte (quarterfinals)
3. (Czechoslovakia) Miloslav Mečíř (quarterfinals)
4. n/a
5. (Australia) John Fitzgerald (semifinals)
6. (Australia) John Frawley (quarterfinals)
7. (France) Tarik Benhabiles (first round)
8. (Australia) Brad Drewett (second round)

== Draw ==
=== Key ===
- Q = Qualifier
- WC = Wild card
- LL = Lucky loser
- Alt = Alternate
- SE = Special exempt
- PR = Protected ranking
- ITF = ITF entry
- JE = Junior exempt
- w/o = Walkover
- r = Retired
- d = Defaulted
- SR = Special ranking

=== Finals ===
Semifinals
1	(United States) Mike Bauer	6	4	4
Q	(Netherlands) Huub van Boeckel	2	6	6
5	(Australia) John Fitzgerald	4	4
(Australia) Peter Doohan	6	6

Final
Q	(Netherlands) Huub van Boeckel	6	1	4
(Australia) Peter Doohan	1	6	6

=== Top half ===
First round
1	(United States) M Bauer	6	6
Q	(Australia) P Carter	2	2
(Switzerland) J Hlasek	6	7
(Australia) W Masur	2	5
(New Zealand) R Simpson	6	7
(New Zealand) B Derlin	3	6
(Israel) S Perkiss	5	6	6
7	(France) T Benhabiles	7	2	2
(United States) K Belcher	7	6
(United Kingdom) C Dowdeswell	5	3
Q	(Netherlands) H van Boeckel	6	3	6
(United States) D Cassidy	3	6	3
(United States) D Saltz	1	6	6
(Australia) J Alexander	6	1	4
Q	(Australia) C A Miller	4	1
6	(Australia) J Frawley	6	6

Second round
1	(United States) M Bauer	6	6
(Switzerland) J Hlasek	2	2
(New Zealand) R Simpson	2	6
(Israel) S Perkiss	6	7
(United States) K Belcher	6	4	1
Q	(Netherlands) H van Boeckel	3	6	6
(United States) D Saltz	2	2
6	(Australia) J Frawley	6	6

Quarterfinals
1	(United States) M Bauer	7	7
(Israel) S Perkiss	5	6
Q	(Netherlands) H van Boeckel	7	6
6	(Australia) J Frawley	6	4

Semifinals
1	(United States) M Bauer	6	4	4
Q	(Netherlands) H van Boeckel	2	6	6

=== Bottom half ===
First round
5	(Australia) J Fitzgerald	7	6	6
(United States) G Layendecker	6	7	4
(United States) H Sands	7	6
(United States) S McCain	6	4
(United States) M Anger	6	6
(Australia) C Limberger	1	4
Q	(Australia) D Cahill	5	5
3	(Czechoslovakia) M Mečíř	7	7
8	(Australia) B Drewett	7	6
(United States) J Mattke	6	4
(Australia) P Doohan	7	6	7
(United States) R Harmon	6	7	5
(United Kingdom) J Smith	7	5	6
(South Africa) C van Rensburg	6	7	3
(United States) S Denton	4	4
2	(United States) T Mayotte	6	6

Second round
5	(Australia) J Fitzgerald	6	6
(United States) H Sands	1	3
(United States) M Anger	4	3
3	(Czechoslovakia) M Mečíř	6	6
8	(Australia) B Drewett	6	3
(Australia) P Doohan	7	6
(United Kingdom) J Smith	6	2
2	(United States) T Mayotte	7	6

Quarterfinals
5	(Australia) J Fitzgerald	6	6
3	(Czechoslovakia) M Mečíř	3	3
(Australia) P Doohan	4	6	7
2	(United States) T Mayotte	6	2	6

Semifinals
5	(Australia) J Fitzgerald	4	4
(Australia) P Doohan	6	6
