= 1982 South Australian Open – Doubles =

Doubles
- 1982 South Australian Open

Final
- Champions: (Australia) Pat Cash (Australia) Chris Johnstone
- Runners-up: (Australia) Broderick Dyke (Australia) Wayne Hampson
- Score: 6–3, 6–7, 7–6

Events
Singles	Doubles
- South Australian Open

Colin Dibley and John James were the defending champions, but did not participate this year.

Pat Cash and Chris Johnstone won the title, defeating Broderick Dyke and Wayne Hampson 6–3, 6–7, 7–6 in the final.

== Seeds ==
1. (Australia) Syd Ball / (Australia) Rod Frawley (quarterfinals)
2. (Australia) John Alexander / (Australia) John Fitzgerald (first round)
3. (United Kingdom) John Lloyd / (South Africa) Bernard Mitton (first round)
4. (United States) Bill Maze / (United States) Hank Pfister (quarterfinals)

== Draw ==
Key

- Q = Qualifier
- WC = Wild card
- LL = Lucky loser
- Alt = Alternate
- ITF = ITF entry
- PR = Protected ranking
- SR = Special ranking
- SE = Special exempt
- JE = Junior exempt
- JR = Junior Accelerator Programme entrant
- CO = College Accelerator Programme entrant
- NG = Next Gen Accelerator Program entrant
- w/o = Walkover
- r = Retired
- d = Defaulted

=== Draw ===
First round
1	(Australia) S Ball (Australia) R Frawley	6	7
(United States) C Edwards (South Africa) E Edwards	4	6
(Australia) P Cash (Australia) C Johnstone	7	4	6
(United States) M De Palmer (United States) M Leach	6	6	4
(United States) M Estep (New Zealand) J Simpson	7	7
3	(United Kingdom) J Lloyd (South Africa) B Mitton	5	5
(United States) M Gandolfo (United States) S McCain	6	6
(Australia) C Letcher (Australia) CA Miller	4	4
(Australia) D Graham (Australia) L Warder	7	6
(United Kingdom) R Lewis (United Kingdom) J Smith	6	4
4	(United States) B Maze (United States) H Pfister	6	6	7
(United States) R Crowley (United States) D Siegler	4	7	6
(United States) M Bauer (United States) J Benson	4	6	6
(United States) M Cahill (Australia) A Lane	6	3	3
(Australia) B Dyke (Australia) W Hampson	6	6	6
2	(Australia) J Alexander (Australia) J Fitzgerald	2	7	3

Quarterfinals
1	(Australia) S Ball (Australia) R Frawley	6	6
(Australia) P Cash (Australia) C Johnstone	7	7
(United States) M Estep (New Zealand) J Simpson	6	6
(United States) M Gandolfo (United States) S McCain	3	3
(Australia) D Graham (Australia) L Warder	7	1	7
4	(United States) B Maze (United States) H Pfister	6	6	5
(United States) M Bauer (United States) J Benson	4	4
(Australia) B Dyke (Australia) W Hampson	6	6

Semifinals
(Australia) P Cash (Australia) C Johnstone	7	6
(United States) M Estep (New Zealand) J Simpson	6	2
(Australia) D Graham (Australia) L Warder	3	4
(Australia) B Dyke (Australia) W Hampson	6	6

Final
(Australia) P Cash (Australia) C Johnstone	6	6	7
(Australia) B Dyke (Australia) W Hampson	3	7	6
