= 1972 South Australian Tennis Championships =

- Date: 17–23 January
- Edition: 75th
- Category: Grand Prix
- Draw: 64S (men); 26S (women)
- Surface: Grass / outdoor
- Location: Adelaide, Australia
- Venue: Memorial Drive

Champions

Men's singles
- (Soviet Union) Alex Metreveli

Women's singles
- (Australia) Evonne Goolagong

Men's doubles
- (Australia) John Cooper / (Australia) Colin Dibley

Women's doubles
- (Australia) Evonne Goolagong / (Soviet Union) Olga Morozova
- South Australian Championships

The 1972 South Australian Championships was a combined men's and women's Grand Prix tennis tournament held at the Memorial Drive in Adelaide, Australia and played on outdoor grass courts. It was the 75th edition of the tournament and was held from 17 January through 23 January 1972. First-seeded Alex Metreveli and Evonne Goolagong won the singles titles.

== Finals ==
=== Men's singles ===
(Soviet Union) Alex Metreveli defeated (Australia) Kim Warwick 6–3, 6–3, 7–6

- It was Metreveli's 3rd title of the year, and the 5th of his career.

=== Women's singles ===
(Australia) Evonne Goolagong defeated (Soviet Union) Olga Morozova 7–6, 6–3

=== Men's doubles ===
(Australia) John Cooper / (Australia) Colin Dibley defeated (Australia) Ross Case / (Soviet Union) Alex Metreveli 6–7, 6–4, 7–6, 4–6, 6–0

=== Women's doubles ===
(Australia) Evonne Goolagong / (Soviet Union) Olga Morozova defeated (Australia) Marylin Tesch / (Australia) Kerry Hogarth 6–3, 6–0
