= 1987 South Australian Open =

- Date: 30 December 1986 – 5 January 1987
- Edition: 86th
- Category: Grand Prix
- Draw: 32S / 16D
- Prize money: $89,400
- Surface: Grass / outdoor
- Location: Adelaide, Australia

Champions

Singles
- (Australia) Wally Masur

Doubles
- (Czechoslovakia) Ivan Lendl / (United States) Bill Scanlon
- South Australian Open

The 1987 South Australian Open was a men's Grand Prix tennis circuit tournament played on outdoor grass courts in Adelaide, Australia. It was the 86th edition of the tournament and was held from 30 December 1986 until 5 January 1987. Seventh-seeded Wally Masur won the singles title.

== Finals ==
=== Singles ===
(Australia) Wally Masur defeated (United States) Bill Scanlon 6–4, 7–6^{(7–2)}

- It was Masur's 1st singles title of the year and the 2nd of his career.

=== Doubles ===
(Czechoslovakia) Ivan Lendl / (United States) Bill Scanlon defeated (Australia) Peter Doohan / (Australia) Laurie Warder 6–7, 6–3, 6–4
