= 1989 South Australian Open =

- Date: 2–9 January
- Edition: 45th Australian Hard Court Championships; 88th South Australian Open
- Category: Grand Prix circuit
- Draw: 32S / 16D
- Prize money: $93,400
- Surface: Hard / outdoor
- Location: Adelaide, Australia
- Venue: Memorial Drive Park

Champions

Singles
- (Australia) Mark Woodforde

Doubles
- (United Kingdom) Neil Broad / (South Africa) Stefan Kruger
← 1988 ·	South Australian Open	· 1990 →

The 1989 South Australian Open also known as the Australian Hard Court Championships was a men's Grand Prix tennis circuit tournament played on outdoor hard courts at the Memorial Drive Park in Adelaide, Australia and was part of the 1989 Nabisco Grand Prix. The tournament was held from 2 January through 9 January 1989. Fourth-seeded Mark Woodforde won his second consecutive singles title at the event.

== Finals ==
=== Singles ===
(Australia) Mark Woodforde defeated (West Germany) Patrik Kühnen 7–5, 1–6, 7–5

- It was Woodforde's 1st title of the year and the 5th of his career.

=== Doubles ===
(United Kingdom) Neil Broad / (South Africa) Stefan Kruger defeated (Australia) Mark Kratzmann / (United States) Glenn Layendecker 6–2, 7–6

- It was Broad's 1st title of the year and the 1st of his career. It was Kruger's only title of the year and the 1st of his career.
