= 1983 South Australian Open =

- Date: 29 December – 2 January 1984
- Edition: 81st
- Category: Grand Prix
- Draw: 32S / 16D
- Prize money: $75,000
- Surface: Grass / outdoor
- Location: Adelaide, Australia

Champions

Singles
- (United States) Mike Bauer

Doubles
- (Australia) Craig A. Miller / (United States) Eric Sherbeck
- South Australian Open

The 1983 South Australian Open was a men's professional tennis tournament held in Adelaide, Australia. The event was part of the 1983 Grand Prix circuit and was played on outdoor grass courts. It was the seventh edition of the tournament and was held from 29 December to 2 January 1984. Fifth-seeded Mike Bauer won the singles title.

== Finals ==
=== Singles ===
(United States) Mike Bauer defeated (Czechoslovakia) Miloslav Mečíř 3–6, 6–4, 6–1

- It was Bauer's 3rd title of the year, and the 8th of his career.

=== Doubles ===
(Australia) Craig A. Miller / (United States) Eric Sherbeck defeated (Australia) Broderick Dyke / (Australia) Rod Frawley 6–3, 4–6, 6–4

- It was Miller's 2nd title of the year and the 2nd of his career. It was Sherbeck's only title of the year and the 1st of his career.
