= 1974 South Australian Tennis Championships =

- Date: 1–7 December
- Edition: 76th
- Category: Non-tour
- Prize money: $5,000
- Surface: Grass
- Location: Adelaide, Australia

Champions

Men's singles
- (Sweden) Björn Borg

Women's singles
- (Soviet Union) Olga Morozova
- South Australian Championships

The 1974 South Australian Championships was a combined men's and women's professional tennis tournament played on outdoor grass courts in Adelaide, Australia. It was the 76th edition of the tournament and was held from 1 December until 7 December 1974. First-seeded Björn Borg and Olga Morozova won the singles titles.

== Finals ==
=== Men's singles ===
(Sweden) Björn Borg defeated (Australia) Onny Parun 6–4, 6–4, 3–6, 6–2

- It was Borg's 8th singles title of the year and of his career.

=== Women's singles ===
(Soviet Union) Olga Morozova defeated (Australia) Evonne Goolagong 7–6, 2–6, 6–2
