= World Tennis Challenge =

Defunct tennis tournament
- Founded: 2009
- Abolished: 2019
- Location: Adelaide; Australia
- Venue: Memorial Drive Park (2009–2019)
- Category: Exhibition
- Surface: Hard court
- Draw: RR 4 teams
- Website: WorldTennisChallenge.com

The World Tennis Challenge was a three night professional exhibition tennis tournament held in the week before the Australian Open in Adelaide, South Australia as part of the Australian Open Series. The tournament was created by a consortium of past players including Jim Courier, Darren Cahill, Mark Woodforde and Roger Rasheed And Alistair (Macdonald)It had four teams of two players, a 'legend' and a current player and are paired into areas e.g. Americas or represent their countries. The current players play each other in a best of 3 match with a match tiebreaker for a 3rd set. The legends play a pro set, and the doubles if needed is a normal set with no a rules before a super tie break if needed.

The event was first held in 2009 for an initial period of 3 years. 2

== 2009 ==
=== Players and teams ===
Team	Pro Player	Legend
Australia	Mark Philippoussis/Mark Verryth	Pat Cash
France	Gaël Monfils/Fabrice Santoro	Henri Leconte
Sweden	Joachim Johansson	Mats Wilander/Mansour Bahrami
United States	Taylor Dent	Jim Courier

== 2010 ==
Played between 12 and 14 January.

=== Players and teams ===
Team	Pro Player	Legend
Australasia	Bernard Tomic	Pat Cash
Europe	Gilles Simon	Henri Leconte
(United Nations) Internationals	Radek Štěpánek	Pat Rafter/Mansour Bahrami
(United States) Americas	Robby Ginepri	John McEnroe

=== Schedule ===
Tuesday Night: Australia v Americas and International v Europe

Wednesday Night: Australia v International and Europe v Americas

Thursday Night: Australia v Europe and International v Americas

=== Results ===
Results - Tuesday 12 Jan

Men's Singles (Current)

Stepanek def. Simon 7-6 (4), 6-0
Tomic def. Ginepri 7-6 (4) 6-4

Men's Singles (Legends)

Leconte def. Bahrami 8-5
Cash def. McEnroe 8-6

Men's doubles

Stepanek/Bahrami (International) def. Simon/Leconte (Europe) 7-5
Ginepri & McEnroe (Americas) def. Tomic & Cash (Australia) 6-7 (5)

Results – Thursday 14 January

CURRENT PLAYERS
Bernard Tomic (291) def. Gilles Simon (15) 6-0, 6-7 (4-7), (10-6)
Radek Štěpánek (13) def. Robby Ginepri (96) 6-4, 6-0

PAST PLAYERS
Pat Rafter def. John McEnroe 8-6
Pat Cash def. Henri Leconte 8-4

DOUBLES
Tomic/Cash def. Simon/ Leconte 7-6 (7-5)
McEnroe/Ginepri def. Stepanek/Rafter 6-3

== 2011 ==
Played between 11 and 13 January.

=== Players and teams ===
Team	Pro Player	Legend
Australasia	Kei Nishikori	Pat Cash
Europe	Michaël Llodra	Henri Leconte
(United Nations) Internationals	Ivan Ljubičić	Ivan Lendl
(United States) Americas	James Blake (replaced by Ryan Harrison)	John McEnroe

11 Jan Australasia v Americas Internationals v Europe 12 Jan Australasia v Internationals Americas v Europe 13 Jan Australasia v Europe Americas v Internationals

== 2012 ==
Played between 10 and 12 January.

=== Players and teams ===
Team	Pro Player	Legend
Australasia	Alexandr Dolgopolov	Patrick Rafter
Europe	Michaël Llodra	Henri Leconte
(United Nations) Internationals	Stanislas Wawrinka	Brad Gilbert/Mansour Bahrami
(United States) Americas	Tommy Haas	John McEnroe

== 2017 ==
The 2017 World Tennis Challenge ran from the 10th until the 12th of January 2017 as part of the Australian Open Series. The team names (Red, Blue and Gold) are based on the state colours of South Australia.

=== Players and teams ===
Team	Men's Doubles	Men's Singles	Legend's Singles
Team Red	(United States) Bob Bryan / (United States) Mike Bryan	(United States) Sam Querrey	(France) Fabrice Santoro
Team Blue	(Canada) Daniel Nestor / (France) Edouard Roger-Vasselin	(Czech Republic) Tomas Berdych	(Croatia) Goran Ivanisevic
Team Gold	(Australia) John Peers / (Finland) Henri Kontinen	(Ukraine) Alexandr Dolgopolov	(Australia) Mark Philippoussis

== Champions ==
Year	Team
2009	(United States) Americas
2010	Australasia
2011	(United States) Americas
2012	(United States) Americas
