= 1972 South Australian Tennis Championships – Men's singles =

Men's singles
- 1972 South Australian Tennis Championships

Final
- Champion: (Soviet Union) Alex Metreveli
- Runner-up: (Australia) Kim Warwick
- Score: 6–3, 6–3, 7–6

Details
- Draw: 64

Events
Singles	men	women
Doubles	men	women
- South Australian Tennis Championships

Defending champion and first-seeded Alex Metreveli defeated Kim Warwick in the final 6–3, 6–3, 7–6, to win the 1972 South Australian Tennis Championships men's singles event. The first round was played as best of three sets, while all other rounds were played as best of five sets.

== Draw ==
Key

- Q = Qualifier
- WC = Wild card
- LL = Lucky loser
- Alt = Alternate
- ITF = ITF entry
- PR = Protected ranking
- SR = Special ranking
- SE = Special exempt
- JE = Junior exempt
- JR = Junior Accelerator Programme entrant
- CO = College Accelerator Programme entrant
- NG = Next Gen Accelerator Program entrant
- w/o = Walkover
- r = Retired
- d = Defaulted

=== Main draw ===
Third round
(Soviet Union) Alex Metreveli	6	6
(Australia) Ian Bidmeade	0	2
(Australia) John James	6	7
(France) Wanaro N'Godrella	2	6
(Australia) John Cooper	6	6
(Canada) Don McCormick	3	4
(Australia) Colin Dibley	7	6
(France) Jean-Paul Meyer	5	1
(Australia) Kim Warwick	6	6
(Australia) Cedric Mason	2	2
(Japan) Kiyoshi Tanabe	2	6	6
(Australia) Ross Case	6	4	4
(France) Patrick Proisy	5	6	6
(Australia) Keith Hancock	7	3	3
(Australia) Mervyn Rose	3	4
(France) Patrice Dominguez	6	6

Quarterfinals
(Soviet Union) Alex Metreveli	6	7	6
(Australia) John James	3	5	4
(Australia) John Cooper	7	6	6
(Australia) Colin Dibley	6	4	3
(Australia) Kim Warwick	6	6	6
(Japan) Kiyoshi Tanabe	2	3	2
(France) Patrick Proisy	7	6	1	6	6
(France) Patrice Dominguez	5	7	6	1	2

Semifinals
(Soviet Union) Alex Metreveli	2	6	6	6	6
(Australia) John Cooper	6	2	7	4	2
(Australia) Kim Warwick	6	7	6
(France) Patrick Proisy	0	6	3

Final
(Soviet Union) Alex Metreveli	6	6	7
(Australia) Kim Warwick	3	3	6
