= 1982 South Australian Open =

- Date: 20–28 December
- Edition: 80th
- Category: Grand Prix
- Draw: 32S / 16D
- Prize money: $75,000
- Surface: Grass
- Location: Adelaide, Australia

Champions

Singles
- (United States) Mike Bauer

Doubles
- (Australia) Pat Cash / (Australia) Chris Johnstone
- South Australian Championships

The 1982 South Australian Open was a men's Grand Prix tennis circuit tournament held in Adelaide, Australia that took place from 20 December until 28 December 1982. It was the 80th edition of the tournament and was played on outdoor grass courts. Unseeded Mike Bauer won the singles title.

== Finals ==
=== Singles ===
(United States) Mike Bauer defeated (Australia) Chris Johnstone 4–6, 7–6, 6–2

- It was Bauer's 3rd title of the year and the 5th of his career.

=== Doubles ===
(Australia) Pat Cash / (Australia) Chris Johnstone defeated (Australia) Broderick Dyke / (Australia) Wayne Hampson 6–3, 6–7, 7–6

- It was Cash's 2nd title of the year and the 2nd of his career. It was Johnstone's only title of the year and the 1st of his career.
