= Tomm Warneke =

American tennis player

- Full name: Tomm Warneke
- Country (sports): United States
- Born: October 9, 1961 (age 64) Lakeland, Florida, United States
- Plays: Right-handed
- Prize money: $73,152

Singles
- Career record: 6-17
- Career titles: 0
- Highest ranking: No. 159 (March 17, 1986)

Grand Slam singles results
- French Open: 2R (1985)
- US Open: 1R (1986)

Doubles
- Career record: 38-37
- Career titles: 0
- Highest ranking: No. 43 (March 9, 1987)

Grand Slam doubles results
- Australian Open: 3R (1985)
- French Open: 3R (1986)
- Wimbledon: 1R (1986)
- US Open: QF (1986)

Tomm Warneke (born October 9, 1961) is a former professional tennis player and coaches from Florida.

== Biography ==
The son of a geologist, Warneke is the youngest of five brothers, along with his twin. He started playing tennis aged six and throughout the age groups was consistently the top ranked player in Florida. In 1979 he was a member of the American Junior Davis Cup team. A graduate of Santa Fe High School, he took up a scholarship to Trinity University in Texas and completed a degree in business administration, while earning multiple All-American honours for his tennis.

Warneke, who turned professional in 1984, had a game more suited to doubles so it was in that format that he had more success. He made his only Grand Prix final in the doubles event at the 1985 South Australian Open, when he and Brazilian Nelson Aerts finished runners-up. He won two ATP Challenger doubles titles in 1985. At Grand Slam level he managed to reach the quarter-finals of the 1986 US Open with Michael Robertson. He reached his highest doubles ranking of 43 in the world in 1987.

He twice qualified for the main singles draw at a Grand Slam tournament. At the 1985 French Open he made it through in the opening round with a four-set win over Pablo Arraya, then was eliminated by Marcos Hocevar in the second round, after another four-set match. He was drawn against 15th seed Brad Gilbert in the first round of the 1986 US Open and was unable to cause an upset, despite winning the opening set then being a break and 40-love up in the second.

After his touring career ended, Warneke was involved in coaching. He was the Director of Tennis at the Saw Mill Woodlake club in Lakeland and taught at the Rick Macci Tennis Academy at Grenelefe Resort in Haines City. Following that he was Head of Tennis at the Palm Coast Players Club, then in 1993 was appointed Director of Tennis at Lakeland's Grasslands Golf and Country Club.

== Grand Prix career finals ==
=== Doubles: 1 (0–1) ===
Result	W/L	Date	Tournament	Surface	Partner	Opponents	Score
Loss	0–1	Dec 1985	Adelaide, Australia	Grass	(Brazil) Nelson Aerts	(Australia) Mark Edmondson (Australia) Kim Warwick	4–6, 4–6

== Challenger titles ==
=== Doubles: (2) ===
No.	Year	Tournament	Surface	Partner	Opponents	Score
1.	1985	Montreal, Canada	Hard	(United States) Andy Andrews	(New Zealand) Kelly Evernden (South Africa) Michael Robertson	6–3, 7–6
2.	1985	Schenectady, U.S.	Hard	(United States) Andy Andrews	(United States) Fred Perrin (United States) Norm Schellenger	6–4, 7–6
