= Bill Scanlon =

American tennis player (1956–2021)

- Country (sports): United States
- Born: November 13, 1956 Dallas, Texas, US
- Died: June 2, 2021 (aged 64) Park City, Utah, US
- Height: 1.85 m (6 ft 1 in)
- Turned pro: 1976
- Retired: 1989
- Plays: Right-handed (one-handed backhand)
- Prize money: $1,427,007

Singles
- Career record: 305–259
- Career titles: 7
- Highest ranking: No. 9 (January 9, 1984)

Grand Slam singles results
- Australian Open: QF (1980)
- French Open: 2R (1977, 1979)
- Wimbledon: QF (1979)
- US Open: SF (1983)

Other tournaments
- WCT Finals: SF (1983)

Doubles
- Career record: 99–152
- Career titles: 2
- Highest ranking: No. 132 (July 13, 1987)

William Neil Scanlon (November 13, 1956 – June 2, 2021) was a tennis player from the United States, who won seven singles and two doubles titles during his 13-year professional career. The right-hander reached his career-high ATP singles ranking of World No. 9 in January 1984. He is also known for having upset top-seeded John McEnroe in the fourth round at the 1983 US Open.

== Career ==
After winning the NCAA Singles championships in 1976 as a sophomore for Trinity University (upsetting UCLA's Peter Fleming), Scanlon turned pro and, in his first Grand Prix event, defeated world #7 Harold Solomon to reach the quarter-finals. His first ever ATP singles ranking was No. 154. Later that summer, Scanlon defeated world no. 4 Adriano Panatta at the US Open and, with two wins over former world #1 Ilie Năstase in early 1977, climbed the rankings to No. 23 by March 1977.

After a frustrating season in 1978, Scanlon rebounded in his final tournament of the year to take the title in Maui with wins over John McEnroe, Harold Solomon, and Peter Fleming. In 1979 he reached the quarter-finals of Wimbledon (losing to Jimmy Connors) before successfully defending his title in Maui, again beating Fleming in the final.

Scanlon peaked in 1983 when he reached the semi-finals of the US Open. He defeated Henrik Sundström, Chris Lewis, Pat Cash, John McEnroe, and Mark Dickson, before losing to Jimmy Connors.

In 1985 Scanlon underwent two knee surgeries, missing most of the season. He continued to compete through 1989, winning only one more singles title, the 1986 Hall of Fame Championships in Newport, Rhode Island.

During his career, Scanlon would log wins over eight players who had been or would be ranked #1 in the world, namely Stan Smith, Ilie Năstase (twice), Björn Borg, John McEnroe (three times), Ivan Lendl, Mats Wilander, Boris Becker, and Andre Agassi. Scanlon's other notable victories over top players included wins over Guillermo Vilas (career high No. 2) and Vitas Gerulaitis (career high #3), as well as Adriano Panatta (career high No. 4), Pat Cash (career high No. 4), and Harold Solomon (career high No. 5).

=== Golden set ===
Scanlon achieved a golden set against Marcos Hocevar of Brazil in the first round of the WCT Gold Coast Classic at Delray Beach, Florida on February 22, 1983. Scanlon won the match, 6–2, 6–0. A golden set is a player winning a set without losing a single point. The feat is recorded in the Guinness Book of World Records. Only Tine Scheuer-Larsen, Yaroslava Shvedova, and Julian Reister have since repeated the feat.

=== Activities and distinctions ===
Scanlon was inducted into the Intercollegiate Tennis Hall of Fame and the Texas Tennis Hall of Fame. His Golden Set achievement is represented in the International Tennis Hall of Fame. He served on the ATP Board of Directors during his professional career and also founded the Dallas Youth Foundation in 1984 to provide sports activities to Dallas area youth featuring professional tennis players, Dallas Cowboys, Texas Rangers, Dallas Mavericks, and Olympic athletes. He also served on the board of the Southern California Tennis Association and the USTA Davis Cup committee. He was chairman of the Carl Reiner Celebrity Pro-Am and was co-founder of the Beverly Hills Invitational Charity Event.

== Post-tennis career ==
Scanlon was a professional investment advisor from 1992 on. He was founder and principal of Advantage Capital Advisors LLC, a registered investment advisor in Los Angeles, California. He was formerly the senior partner of The Scanlon Group, a top wealth management team at UBS Financial in Los Angeles.

=== Author ===
In 2014, Scanlon authored "Zen Tennis - Playing in the Zone" with co-author Dr. Joe Parent. Parent is a renowned PGA Tour mental game coach, and author of "Zen Golf". Scanlon also authored the book Bad News for McEnroe: Blood, Sweat, and Backhands with John, Jimmy, Ilie, Ivan, Bjorn, and Vitas in 2004 as a tribute to the era during which he participated on the ATP International Tour. The book focuses on the high-profile personalities of the sport during that era, their rivalries, their celebrity, and the growth of the sport's popularity.

== Personal life ==
Scanlon and his wife, Stephanie, lived in Bel Air, California, and Park City, Utah.

Bill Scanlon died of cancer on June 2, 2021, at the age of 64.

== Career finals ==
=== Singles: 14 (6 titles / 8 runners-up) ===
Legend
Grand Slam (0)
Grand Prix (5)
WCT (2)

Result	W/L	Date	Tournament	Surface	Opponent	Score
Loss	0–1	Jan 1977	Birmingham WCT, Birmingham, U.S.	Carpet (i)	(United States) Jimmy Connors	3–6, 3–6
Loss	0–2	Apr 1977	Jackson Mississippi, US	Carpet (i)	(United States) Brian Teacher	3–6, 3–6
Win	1–2	Oct 1978	Maui, Hawaii, US	Hard	(United States) Peter Fleming	6–2, 6–0
Win	2–2	Oct 1979	Maui, Hawaii, US	Hard	(United States) Peter Fleming	6–1, 6–1
Win	3–2	Jan 1981	Auckland, New Zealand	Hard	(United States) Tim Wilkison	6–7, 6–3, 3–6, 7–6, 6–0
Win	4–2	Nov 1981	Bangkok, Thailand	Carpet (i)	(Sweden) Mats Wilander	6–2, 6–3
Win	5–2	Mar 1982	Zurich WCT, Zurich, Switzerland	Carpet (i)	(United States) Vitas Gerulaitis	7–5, 7–6, 1–6, 0–6, 6–4
Loss	5–3	Oct 1982	Vienna, Austria	Hard (i)	(United States) Brian Gottfried	1–6, 4–6, 0–6
Loss	5–4	Oct 1982	Paris Indoor, Paris France	Carpet (i)	(Poland) Wojciech Fibak	2–6, 2–6, 2–6
Loss	5–5	Nov 1982	Chicago-2 WCT, Chicago, U.S.	Carpet (i)	(Poland) Wojciech Fibak	2–6, 6–2, 3–6, 4–6
Loss	5–6	Dec 1982	Hartford WCT, Hartford, U.S.	Carpet (i)	(Czechoslovakia) Ivan Lendl	2–6, 4–6, 5–7
Loss	5–7	Aug 1983	Vienna, Austria	Hard	(United States) Brian Teacher	6–7, 4–6
Win	6–7	Jul 1986	Newport, U.S.	Grass	(United States) Tim Wilkison	7–5, 6–4
Loss	6–8	Jan 1987	Adelaide, Australia	Grass	(Australia) Wally Masur	4–6, 6–7^{(2–7)}

=== Doubles: 7 (2 titles / 5 runner-ups) ===
Result	W/L	Date	Tournament	Surface	Partner	Opponents	Score
Loss	0–1	Jan 1977	Birmingham WCT, Birmingham, U.S.	Carpet	(United States) Billy Martin	(Poland) Wojciech Fibak (Netherlands) Tom Okker	3–6, 4–6
Loss	0–2	Mar 1977	Monterrey WCT, Monterrey, Mexico	Carpet	(United States) Billy Martin	(Australia) Ross Case (Poland) Wojciech Fibak	6–3, 3–6, 4–6
Win	1–2	Oct 1977	Brisbane, Australia	Grass	(United States) Vitas Gerulaitis	(Australia) Mal Anderson (Australia) Ken Rosewall	7–6, 6–4
Loss	1–3	Mar 1980	Rotterdam, Netherlands	Carpet	(United States) Brian Teacher	(India) Vijay Amritraj (United States) Stan Smith	4–6, 3–6
Loss	1–4	Nov 1980	Wembley, England	Carpet	(United States) Eliot Teltscher	(United States) Peter Fleming (United States) John McEnroe	5–7, 3–6
Loss	1–5	Jan 1981	Auckland, New Zealand	Hard	(United States) Tony Graham	(United States) Ferdi Taygan (United States) Tim Wilkison	5–7, 1–6
Win	2–5	Jan 1987	Adelaide, Australia	Grass	(United States) Ivan Lendl	(Australia) Peter Doohan (Australia) Laurie Warder	6–7, 6–3, 6–4

== Records ==
- These records were attained in the Open Era of tennis.

Tournament	Year	Record accomplished	Player tied
Delray Beach WCT	1983	Achieved a Golden Set	Stefano Napolitano; Julian Reister
