= Memorial Drive Park =

Tennis venue in Adelaide, South Australia

- Memorial Drive; The Drive
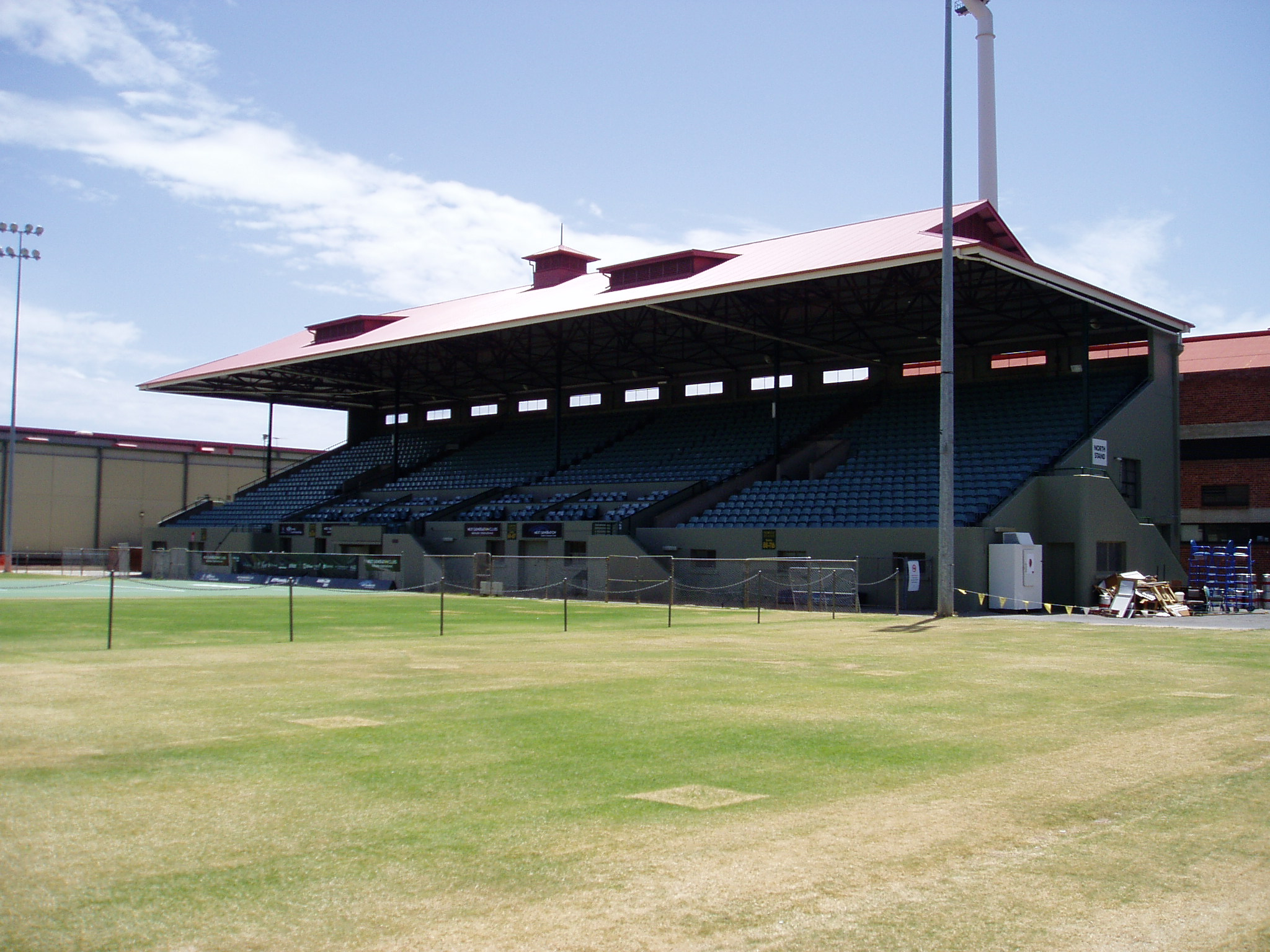
- The main court at Memorial Drive, showing the former northern grandstand
- Interactive map of Memorial Drive Park
- Location: War Memorial Drive, Adelaide, South Australia
- Coordinates: 34°55′03″S 138°35′46″E
- Operator: Memorial Drive Tennis Club / Tennis SA & Adelaide Venue Management Corporation
- Capacity: 6,500
- Surface: GreenSet

Construction
- Opened: October 1921

Tenants
- South Australian Championships (1889–1989); Australian Open (Various years); Australian Hard Court Championships (1988–2008); World Tennis Challenge (2009–2019); Adelaide International (2020–present)

Memorial Drive Park, more generally referred to as "Memorial Drive", is a tennis venue, located adjacent to the Adelaide Oval, in the park lands surrounding the centre of Adelaide, South Australia. Memorial Drive took its name from the winding avenue, known as War Memorial Drive, which separates the venue from the River Torrens.

The venue in its current iteration, as used for concerts and other events, is known as "The Drive".

== History ==
The Memorial Drive Tennis club was established in 1914, under the name South Australian Lawn Tennis Club. About 6 acres (2.4 ha) of land were leased to the club directly adjacent to the Adelaide Oval and the grass courts were opened in October 1921 by the Governor of South Australia, Sir Archibald Weigall. Gerald Patterson won the first South Australian Men's Singles Championship staged at the venue in 1922, the same year in which he also won Wimbledon for the second time. The following year, a clubhouse and grandstand were erected at Memorial Drive, the northern grandstand being the former stand from Adelaide Oval, which was dismantled and then reassembled. In 1938 a large permanent grandstand was erected on the northern side of the courts.

Over the years many major events have been held on the grass courts including the Davis Cup and Australian Open Championships. In 1926 the Australian men's singles title was staged at the courts for the first time, won by John Hawkes. Adelaide hosted a total of fourteen Australian championships until 1967, twelve of which were played at Memorial Drive. In 1938 American Donald Budge won the first leg of the first Grand Slam in tennis at Memorial Drive by defeating Australia's John Bromwich.

In January 1933 Australia played a tennis Test match against the United States. American champion Ellsworth Vines made his only appearance in Adelaide and among the Australian representatives were Harry Hopman, Adrian Quist, and John Bromwich. The following year, international matches featured the English champion Fred Perry.

Adelaide's first exposure to professional tennis involved the French dual Wimbledon champion Henri Cochet in contests against local professionals in 1935. In 1958 and again in 1959 Pancho Gonzalez and Lew Hoad appeared at Memorial Drive as part of Jack Kramer's professional troupe. From 1974 until 2008 the Adelaide International tournament was played at Memorial Drive, and between 2009 and 2019 the World Tennis Challenge exhibition was played there.

Memorial Drive last hosted the Australian Open in 1967, with Roy Emerson winning the Men's singles, Nancy Richey Gunter the Women's singles, John Newcombe and Tony Roche the Men's doubles, Lesley Turner Bowrey and Judy Tegart Dalton winning the Women's doubles, and Turner Bowrey and Owen Davidson the Mixed doubles.

=== 2019–22 redevelopments ===
In February 2019, the South Australian Government announced funding of $10 million to construct a canopy-roof structure over Memorial Drive Park, to prepare the venue to host the new Adelaide International, the first ATP sanctioned event in the city since the Adelaide International in 2008 and the first ever WTA event. Additional minor redevelopments in the precinct allowed Memorial Drive to host the inaugural tournament in January 2020, held one week prior to the first Grand Slam of the year, the Australian Open. Later that year the government announced $44 million would be spent on constructing two new permanent grandstands surrounding the main court, one replacing the northern grandstand and increasing the capacity of the centre to 6,500 patrons. Additional developments include upgrades to the centre's media and broadcast facilities, sports training and development spaces, and function spaces, and integrating the eastern facility with the Adelaide Oval southern plaza. The redevelopment is due for completion in mid-2022.

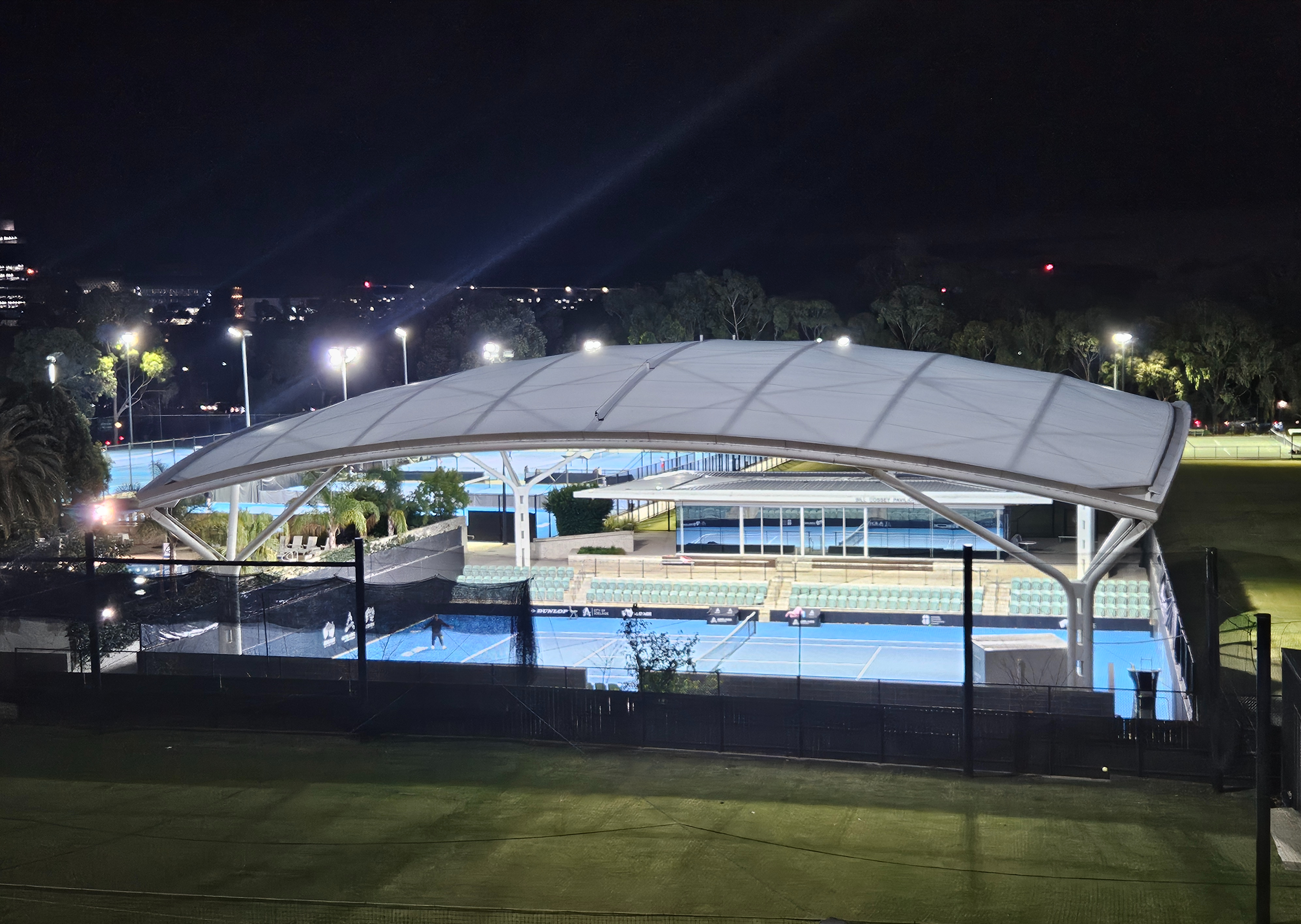
Memorial Drive’s tennis courts in 2025

== Concerts ==
- Elton John - 1971, 1982, 1984 and 1990
- Led Zeppelin - 19 February 1972
- The Bee Gees - 1972
- The Rolling Stones - 20–21 February 1973
- Black Sabbath and Status Quo - 1974
- Slade - 1974
- Uriah Heep - 23 November 1974, with Cold Chisel
- The Skyhooks - 21 December 1974, with Ayers Rock, Daddy Cool, Matt Taylor and Cold Chisel and 20 December 1975
- Joe Cocker - 26 February 1975, with Cold Chisel
- 5KA Concert - 8 March 1975 - The Skyhooks, with Sherbet
- Eric Clapton - 26 April 1975
- Deep Purple - 27 November 1975, with Cold Chisel & 30 November 1984
- Jeff Beck - Jan Hammer - February 1977
- Devo - 1980
- The Police - 24 February 1981
- AC/DC - 1981
- Cold Chisel - 11–12 September 1982
- Dire Straits - 17-18 March 1983
- Duran Duran - 25 November 1983 originally scheduled for the 24th and swapped to the 25th
- Midnight Oil - 2 November 1984, 23 November 1985 and 10 October 2002 (M-One Festival)
- Rod Stewart - 4 February 1985
- Phil Collins - 17 April 1985 and 31 March 1990
- Bob Dylan - 1986, with Tom Petty and the Heartbreakers
- ZZ Top - 1987, with Rose Tattoo
- George Michael - 11–12 March 1988
- INXS - 2 October 1985 (http://inxsonline.com/gigography/), 21 & 22 October 1988 (http://inxsonline.com/gigography/), 19 & 20 April 1991 (http://inxsonline.com/gigography/)
- Stevie Wonder - November 3 1987
- Sting - 11 November 1988
- U2 - 27–28 October 1989, with B.B. King and Weddings Parties Anything
- Bon Jovi - 11 November 1989
- Fleetwood Mac - 1990
- Aerosmith - 29 September 1990
- Cher - 14 November 1990
- Kylie Minogue - 15 February 1991
- Pearl Jam - 8 March 1995, with The Meanies
- KISS - 11 February 1997, with Fireballs
- New Found Glory - 5 April 2002
- Garbage - 10 October 2002
- Carlos Santana - 2003
- New York Dolls - 2007
- Jack Johnson - 27 March 2008, with Matt Costa & Will Connor
- Kings of Leon - 11 March 2009
- Powderfinger - 16 September, with Jet and Yves Klein Blue and 30 October 2010, with Jet and Andrew Morris Duo
- Tom Jones - 26 March 2024, with Germein
- The Amity Affliction - 15 November 2024, with Ice Nine Kills, We Came as Romans and HEAVENSGATE
- Troye Sivan - 19 November 2024, with Nick Ward

== See also ==
- Adelaide Entertainment Centre
- Adelaide Festival Centre
- Adelaide Oval
- Adelaide Jubilee Oval
- Thebarton Theatre
- List of tennis stadiums by capacity

| Preceded by White City Stadium, Sydney; West Side Tennis Club, New York City; Milton Courts, Brisbane; Milton Courts, Brisbane | Davis Cup; Final Venue; 1952; 1956; 1963; 1968 | Succeeded by Kooyong Stadium, Melbourne; Kooyong Stadium, Melbourne; Harold Clark Courts, Cleveland; Harold Clark Courts, Cleveland |
