= Glenn Layendecker =

American tennis player

- Country (sports): United States
- Residence: San Mateo, California
- Born: May 9, 1961 (age 65) Stanford, California
- Height: 1.85 m (6 ft 1 in)
- Turned pro: 1983
- Retired: 1992
- Plays: Left-handed (two-handed backhand)
- Prize money: $647,475

Singles
- Career record: 118–128
- Career titles: 0
- Highest ranking: No. 48 (May 3, 1990)

Grand Slam singles results
- Australian Open: 3R (1991)
- French Open: 1R (1986, 1987)
- Wimbledon: 2R (1989)
- US Open: 2R (1990)

Doubles
- Career record: 119–127
- Career titles: 1
- Highest ranking: No. 32 (October 16, 1989)

Grand Slam doubles results
- Australian Open: 3R (1991)
- French Open: 3R (1986)
- Wimbledon: 3R (1989)
- US Open: QF (1989, 1992)

Glenn Layendecker (born May 9, 1961) is a former professional tennis player from the United States.

His highest singles ranking was world No. 48 in 1990. Layendecker's highest doubles ranking was world No. 32. His career wins included wins over Andre Agassi, Michael Chang, Yannick Noah, Aaron Krickstein, Anders Järryd, and Brad Gilbert in singles matches. He also beaned John McEnroe in the temple with an approach shot at the US Open.

Layendecker graduated from Yale University in 1983.

He was the tennis coach of the Oregon Episcopal School Aardvarks. Under his coaching, the team garnered four consecutive state titles. Layendecker lives in San Mateo, California and worked for the West Coast Conference before retiring in 2023.

== Career finals ==
=== Doubles (1 title, 4 runner-ups) ===
Result	W/L	Date	Tournament	Surface	Partner	Opponents	Score
Loss	0–1	Feb 1985	Toronto, Canada	Carpet (i)	(Canada) Glenn Michibata	(Sweden) Anders Järryd (United States) Peter Fleming	7–6, 6–2
Loss	0–2	Oct 1987	San Francisco, US	Carpet (i)	(United States) Todd Witsken	(United States) Jim Grabb (United States) Patrick McEnroe	6–2, 0–6, 6–4
Loss	0–3	Jan 1989	Adelaide, Australia	Grass	(Australia) Mark Kratzmann	(South Africa) Neil Broad (South Africa) Stefan Kruger	6–2, 7–6
Loss	0–4	Feb 1990	San Francisco, US	Carpet (i)	(United States) Richey Reneberg	(United States) Kelly Jones (United States) Robert Van’t Hof	2–6, 7–6, 6–3
Win	1–4	Jul 1992	Stuttgart, Germany	Clay	(South Africa) Byron Talbot	(Spain) Javier Sánchez (Switzerland) Marc Rosset	4–6, 6–3, 6–4
