= Chris Johnstone =

Australian tennis player

- Country (sports): Australia
- Born: 12 October 1960 (age 64); Perth, Western Australia
- Height: 175 cm (5 ft 9 in)
- Plays: Right-handed

Singles
- Career record: 37–64
- Career titles: 0
- Highest ranking: No. 70 (5 July 1982)

Grand Slam singles results
- Australian Open: 2R (1980, 1982, 1983)
- French Open: 2R (1981)
- Wimbledon: 3R (1982)

Doubles
- Career record: 33–60
- Career titles: 1
- Highest ranking: No. 114 (3 January 1983)

Chris Johnstone (born 12 October 1960) is a former professional tennis player from Australia.

== Career ==
Johnstone was runner-up to Pat Serret at the 1978 Australian Junior Championships.

His best Grand Slam performance came at the 1982 Wimbledon Championships, where he had wins over David Schneider and Jay Lapidus, to make the third round. In the mixed doubles he and partner Pam Whytcross were semi-finalists.

A right-hander, Johnstone made the finals in both the singles and doubles draws at the 1982 South Australian Open. He lost the singles final to Mike Bauer but won the doubles, with Pat Cash.

== Grand Prix career finals ==
=== Singles: 1 (0–1) ===
Result	W/L	Date	Tournament	Surface	Opponent	Score
Loss	0–1	Dec 1982	Adelaide, Australia	Grass	(United States) Mike Bauer	6–4, 6–7, 2–6

=== Doubles: 1 (1–0) ===
Result	W/L	Date	Tournament	Surface	Partner	Opponents	Score
Win	1–0	Dec 1982	Adelaide, Australia	Grass	(Australia) Pat Cash	(Australia) Broderick Dyke (Australia) Wayne Hampson	6–3, 6–7, 7–6

== Challenger titles ==
=== Singles: (2) ===
No.	Year	Tournament	Surface	Opponent	Score
1.	1981	Essen, West Germany	Clay	(West Germany) Andreas Maurer	7–5, 7–6
2.	1981	Brisbane, Australia	Grass	(Australia) Phil Dent	6–4, 6–4

=== Doubles: (4) ===
No.	Year	Tournament	Surface	Partner	Opponents	Score
1.	1981	West Worthing, UK	Clay	(New Zealand) Chris Lewis	(South Africa) Rory Chappell (South Africa) Schalk van der Merwe	6–2, 6–3
2.	1981	Ostend, Belgium	Clay	(United Kingdom) John Feaver	(Australia) Cliff Letcher (Australia) Warren Maher	6–4, 6–4
3.	1981	Brisbane, Australia	Grass	(Australia) Craig Miller	(Australia) Brad Drewett (Australia) Warren Maher	6–4, 7–5
4.	1983	Perth, Australia	Grass	(United States) John Benson	(Australia) Peter Doohan (Australia) Michael Fancutt	3–6, 6–4, 7–6
