= Huub van Boeckel =

Dutch tennis player

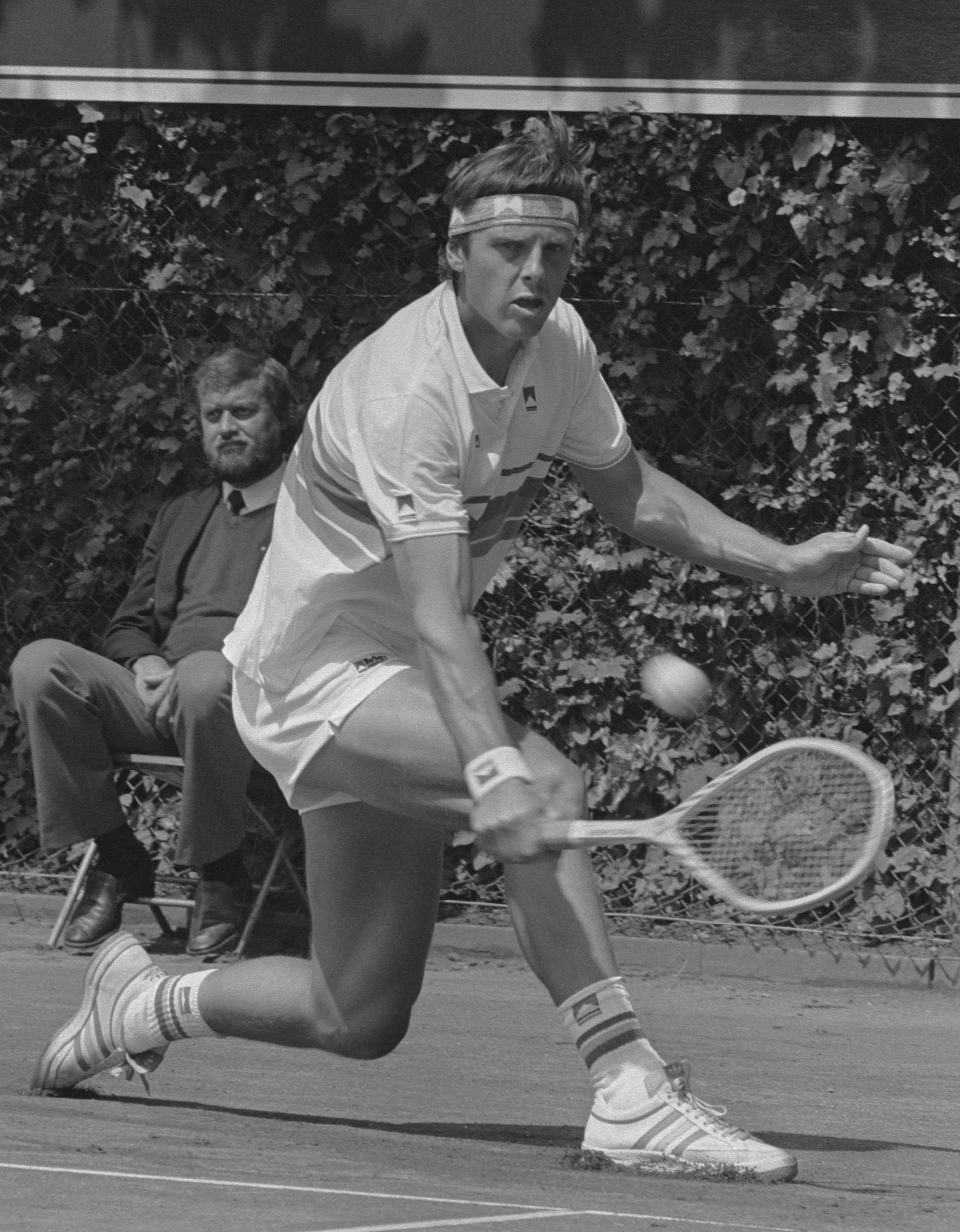
- Country (sports): Netherlands
- Born: 25 January 1960 (age 66) The Hague, Netherlands
- Height: 1.91 m (6 ft 3 in)
- Plays: Right-handed
- Prize money: $121,719

Singles
- Career record: 19–35
- Career titles: 0
- Highest ranking: No. 93 (21 October 1985)

Doubles
- Career record: 29–46
- Career titles: 0
- Highest ranking: No. 96 (26 September 1988)

Huub van Boeckel (born 25 January 1960) is a retired professional tennis player from the Netherlands, who was one of the Netherlands' leading players in the 1980s.

A right-hander, van Boeckel reached his highest singles ranking on the ATP Tour on 21 October 1985, when he became world No. 93.

== Business career ==
Following his retirement from professional tennis, van Boeckel founded HUB Footwear in 2004, a Dutch footwear company based in The Hague.

== Career finals ==
=== Singles (1 runner-up) ===
Result	W–L	Date	Tournament	Surface	Opponent	Score
Loss	0–1	Dec 1984	Adelaide, Australia	Grass	(Australia) Peter Doohan	6–1, 1–6, 4–6

=== Doubles (1 runner-up) ===
Result	W–L	Date	Tournament	Surface	Partner	Opponents	Score
Loss	0–1	Oct 1987	Tel Aviv, Israel	Hard	(Germany) Wolfgang Popp	(Israel) Gilad Bloom (Israel) Shahar Perkiss	2–6, 4–6
