= Eddie Edwards (tennis) =

South African tennis player

- Country (sports): South Africa
- Residence: Johannesburg, South Africa
- Born: 3 July 1956 (age 69) Johannesburg, South Africa
- Height: 6 ft 3 in (1.91 m)
- Plays: Right-handed
- Prize money: $441,869

Singles
- Career record: 87–133
- Career titles: 1
- Highest ranking: No. 42 (14 July 1986)

Grand Slam singles results
- Australian Open: 3R (1984, 1988)
- French Open: 2R (1983)
- Wimbledon: 4R (1986)
- US Open: 3R (1986)

Doubles
- Career record: 136–156
- Career titles: 4
- Highest ranking: No. 40 (18 July 1988)

Eddie Edwards (born 3 July 1956) is a retired professional tour tennis player.

The right-handed Edwards was a tour regular from the mid-1970s to the end of 1987. He played in singles a total of 112 grand prix (including World Championship Tennis events) and 24 grand slam tournaments. His best results were on grass, reaching the fourth round of Wimbledon in 1986 and winning the Adelaide grand prix event in 1985. He reached his career-high singles ranking of world No. 42 in July 1986.

== Tennis career ==
Edwards's career singles record for grand prix and grand slam events was 87 wins and 135 defeats. He also won four doubles titles on tour - Bournemouth in 1980 partnering Craig Edwards of California, Melbourne in 1982 partnering Englishman Jonathan Smith, Lorraine Open 1984 and Bristol Open in 1985, partnering compatriot Danie Visser. Edwards also reached doubles finals in 1981 in Adelaide and at the Stuttgart Indoor with Craig Edwards as his partner, 1985 in Livingston with Visser, and 1986 in Chicago and Newport with Paraguayan Francisco González. He reached a career high doubles ranking of World No. 40 in July 1988. He also partnered American Andy Andrews and won numerous tour doubles titles.

Edwards played college tennis from 1978 through 1980 and earned All-American honors each year while attending Pepperdine University. He had 62 career match wins and an .805 winning percentage (62-15) at Pepperdine.

== Career finals ==
=== Singles: 1 (1 win) ===
Result	W/L	Date	Tournament	Surface	Opponent	Score
Win	1–0	Dec 1985	Adelaide, Australia	Grass	(Australia) Peter Doohan	6–2, 6–4

=== Doubles (4 wins, 5 losses) ===
Result	W/L	Date	Tournament	Surface	Partner	Opponents	Score
Win	1–0	Sep 1980	Bournemouth, UK	Clay	(United States) Craig Edwards	(United Kingdom) Andrew Jarrett (United Kingdom) Jonathan Smith	6–3, 6–7, 8–6
Loss	1–1	Jan 1981	Adelaide, Australia	Grass	(United States) Craig Edwards	(Australia) Colin Dibley (Australia) John James	3–6, 4–6
Loss	1–2	Mar 1981	Stuttgart, West Germany	Hard	(United States) Craig Edwards	(United Kingdom) Buster Mottram (United States) Nick Saviano	6–3, 1–6, 2–6
Win	2–2	Dec 1982	Melbourne, Australia	Grass	(United Kingdom) Jonathan Smith	(Australia) Broderick Dyke (Australia) Wayne Hampson	7–6, 6–3
Win	3–2	Mar 1984	Metz, France	Carpet	(South Africa) Danie Visser	(Australia) Wayne Hampson (New Zealand) Wally Masur	3–6, 6–4, 6–2
Win	4–2	Jun 1985	Bristol, UK	Grass	(South Africa) Danie Visser	(Australia) John Alexander (New Zealand) Russell Simpson	6–4, 7–6
Loss	4–3	Jul 1985	Livingston, US	Hard	(South Africa) Danie Visser	(United States) Mike De Palmer (Australia) Peter Doohan	3–6, 4–6
Loss	4–4	Mar 1986	Chicago, US	Carpet (i)	(Paraguay) Francisco González	(United States) Ken Flach (United States) Robert Seguso	0–6, 5–7
Loss	4–5	Jul 1986	Newport, US	Grass	(Paraguay) Francisco González	(India) Vijay Amritraj (United States) Tim Wilkison	6–4, 5–7, 6–7

== Family ==
Wife: Jackie Edwards
Daughters: Lauren Edwards and Jamie Jean Edwards Instagram
