= Peter Doohan =

Australian tennis player (1961–2017)

- Country (sports): Australia
- Residence: Nelson Bay, New South Wales, Australia
- Born: 2 May 1961 Newcastle, New South Wales, Australia
- Died: 21 July 2017 (aged 56) Australia
- Height: 190 cm (6 ft 3 in)
- Plays: Right-handed (one-handed backhand)
- College: University of Arkansas
- Prize money: $445,192

Singles
- Career record: 49–81
- Career titles: 1
- Highest ranking: No. 43 (3 August 1987)

Grand Slam singles results
- Australian Open: 4R (1987)
- French Open: 1R (1986)
- Wimbledon: 4R (1987)
- US Open: 2R (1984)

Doubles
- Career record: 141–106
- Career titles: 5
- Highest ranking: No. 15 (9 February 1987)

Grand Slam doubles results
- Australian Open: F (1987)
- French Open: 2R (1989)
- Wimbledon: SF (1984, 1988)
- US Open: 3R (1988, 1990)

Grand Slam mixed doubles results
- Australian Open: SF (1989)
- French Open: 3R (1989)
- Wimbledon: 3R (1984, 1985, 1989)
- US Open: 1R (1987)

Peter Leslie Doohan (2 May 1961 – 21 July 2017) was an Australian tennis player who won three consecutive Australian Hard Court Championships singles titles (1984, 1985, 1986), which remains an Open era record for that tournament. He won a further two singles titles at the South Australian Open in 1984 and San Louis Potosí tournament in Mexico in 1988. He also won five doubles titles during his career. The right-hander reached his highest Association of Tennis Professionals (ATP) singles ranking of world No. 43 in August 1987.

== Early and personal life ==
Peter Leslie Doohan was born on 2 May 1961 in Newcastle, New South Wales, to Paul and Thelma Doohan. Her sisters were Cathie Roff and Margaret Knight. His sons include tennis coach John Doohan and American actor Hunter Doohan.

Doohan died on 21 July 2017 from motor neurone disease.

== Career ==
At the 1987 Wimbledon Championships, he unexpectedly defeated two-time defending champion and top-seeded Boris Becker in the second round, earning himself the nickname "The Becker Wrecker" at home in Australia.

Doohan played collegiately in the United States with the University of Arkansas where he won the NCAA doubles title in 1982. Also a successful singles player, he won three Australian Hard Court Championships consecutively from 1984 to 1986. In 1984, he won the South Australian Open singles title. In 1988, he won the San Luis Potosí singles title on clay in San Luis Potosí, Mexico. He also coached high school tennis at Donoho High School in Anniston, Alabama, for several years in the mid-1990s.

== Grand Slam finals ==
=== Doubles: 1 (1 runner-up) ===
Result	Year	Championship	Surface	Partner	Opponents	Score
Loss	1987	Australian Open	Grass	(Australia) Laurie Warder	(Sweden) Stefan Edberg (Sweden) Anders Järryd	4–6, 4–6, 6–7^{(3–7)}

== ATP career finals ==
=== Singles: 4 (1 title, 3 runner-ups) ===
Legend Grand Slam tournaments (0–0) ATP World Tour Finals (0–0) ATP World Tour Masters Series (0–0) ATP World Tour Championship Series (0–0) ATP World Tour World Series (1–3)	Titles by surface Hard (0–0) Clay (0–0) Grass (1–3) Carpet (0–0)	Titles by setting Outdoor (1–3) Indoor (0–0)

Result	W–L	Date	Tournament	Tier	Surface	Opponent	Score
Win	1–0	Dec 1984	Adelaide, Australia	Grand Prix	Grass	(Netherlands) Huub van Boeckel	1–6, 6–1, 6–4
Loss	1–1	Dec 1985	Adelaide, Australia	Grand Prix	Grass	(South Africa) Eddie Edwards	2–6, 4–6
Loss	1–2	Dec 1985	Melbourne, Australia	Grand Prix	Grass	(United States) Jonathan Canter	7–5, 3–6, 4–6
Loss	1–3	Feb 1987	Sydney, Australia	Grand Prix	Grass	(Czech Republic) Miloslav Mečíř	2–6, 4–6

=== Doubles: 14 (5 titles, 9 runner-ups) ===
Legend Grand Slam tournaments (0–1) ATP World Tour Finals (0–0) ATP World Tour Masters Series (0–1) ATP World Tour Championship Series (0–1) ATP World Tour World Series (5–6)	Titles by surface Hard (3–4) Clay (0–1) Grass (2–4) Carpet (0–0)	Titles by setting Outdoor (5–9) Indoor (0–0)

Result	W–L	Date	Tournament	Tier	Surface	Partner	Opponents	Score
Win	1–0	Sep 1984	Tel Aviv, Israel	Grand Prix	Hard	(South Africa) Brian Levine	(United Kingdom) Colin Dowdeswell (Switzerland) Jakob Hlasek	6–3, 6–4
Loss	1–1	Dec 1984	Adelaide, Australia	Grand Prix	Grass	(South Africa) Brian Levine	(Australia) Broderick Dyke (Australia) Wally Masur	6–4, 5–7, 1–6
Win	2–1	Jul 1985	Newport, United States	Grand Prix	Grass	(United States) Sammy Giammalva	(United States) Paul Annacone (South Africa) Christo van Rensburg	6–1, 6–3
Win	3–1	Jul 1985	Livingston, United States	Grand Prix	Hard	(United States) Mike De Palmer	(South Africa) Eddie Edwards (South Africa) Danie Visser	6–3, 6–4
Loss	3–2	Mar 1986	Fort Meyers, United States	Grand Prix	Hard	(Australia) Paul McNamee	(Ecuador) Andrés Gómez (United States) Ivan Lendl	5–7, 4–6
Loss	3–3	Jan 1987	Adelaide, Australia	Grand Prix	Grass	(Australia) Laurie Warder	(United States) Ivan Lendl (United States) Bill Scanlon	7–6, 3–6, 4–6
Loss	3–4	Jan 1987	Melbourne, Australia	Grand Slam	Grass	(Australia) Laurie Warder	(Sweden) Stefan Edberg (Sweden) Anders Järryd	4–6, 4–6, 6–7
Loss	3–5	Feb 1987	Sydney, Australia	Grand Prix	Grass	(Australia) Laurie Warder	(Australia) Brad Drewett (Australia) Mark Edmondson	4–6, 6–4, 2–6
Loss	3–6	Aug 1987	Montreal, Canada	Masters Series	Hard	(Australia) Laurie Warder	(Australia) Pat Cash (Sweden) Stefan Edberg	7–6, 3–6, 4–6
Win	4–6	Jun 1988	Bristol, United Kingdom	Grand Prix	Grass	(Australia) Laurie Warder	(United States) Marty Davis (United States) Tim Pawsat	2–6, 6–4, 7–5
Loss	4–7	Sep 1988	Los Angeles, United States	Grand Prix	Hard	(United States) Jim Grabb	(United States) John McEnroe (Australia) Mark Woodforde	4–6, 4–6
Win	5–7	Jan 1989	Wellington, New Zealand	Grand Prix	Hard	(Australia) Laurie Warder	(United States) Rill Baxter (Canada) Glenn Michibata	3–6, 6–2, 6–3
Loss	5–8	May 1989	Munich, Germany	Grand Prix	Clay	(Australia) Laurie Warder	(Spain) Javier Sánchez (Hungary) Balázs Taróczy	6–7, 3–6
Loss	5–9	Aug 1989	Indianapolis, United States	Championship Series	Hard	(Australia) Laurie Warder	(South Africa) Pieter Aldrich (South Africa) Danie Visser	6–7, 6–7

== ATP Challenger and ITF Futures finals ==
=== Singles: 1 (0–1) ===
Legend ATP Challenger (0–1) ITF Futures (0–0)	Finals by surface Hard (0–0) Clay (0–1) Grass (0–0) Carpet (0–0)

Result	W–L	Date	Tournament	Tier	Surface	Opponent	Score
Loss	0–1	Mar 1989	San Luis Potosí, Mexico	Challenger	Clay	(Mexico) Jorge Lozano	4–6, 4–6

=== Doubles: 1 (1–0) ===
Legend ATP Challenger (1–0) ITF Futures (0–0)	Finals by surface Hard (0–0) Clay (0–0) Grass (0–0) Carpet (1–0)

Result	W–L	Date	Tournament	Tier	Surface	Partner	Opponents	Score
Win	1–0	Sep 1990	Canberra, Australia	Challenger	Carpet	(Australia) Brett Custer	(South Africa) David Adams (Australia) Jamie Morgan	6–3, 6–4

== Performance timelines ==
Key
W	F	SF	QF	#R	RR	Q#	DNQ	A	NH

(W) winner; (F) finalist; (SF) semifinalist; (QF) quarterfinalist; (#R) rounds 4, 3, 2, 1; (RR) round-robin stage; (Q#) qualification round; (DNQ) did not qualify; (A) absent; (NH) not held; (SR) strike rate (events won / competed); (W–L) win–loss record.

=== Singles ===
Tournament	1979	1980	1981	1982	1983	1984	1985	1986	1987	1988	1989	1990	1991	SR	W–L	Win %
Grand Slam tournaments
Australian Open	A	1R	Q1	Q3	1R	1R	3R	A	4R	2R	1R	1R	1R	0 / 9	6–9	40%
French Open	A	A	A	A	A	A	A	1R	A	A	A	A	A	0 / 1	0–1	0%
Wimbledon	Q2	1R	Q1	1R	Q3	Q2	1R	1R	4R	1R	Q2	Q1	A	0 / 6	3–6	33%
US Open	A	A	A	A	A	2R	1R	A	1R	A	A	A	A	0 / 3	1–3	25%
Win–loss	0–0	0–2	0–0	0–1	0–1	1–2	2–3	0–2	6–3	1–2	0–1	0–1	0–1	0 / 19	10–19	34%
ATP Masters Series
Indian Wells	A	A	A	A	A	A	A	A	A	1R	A	A	A	0 / 1	0–1	0%
Miami	A	A	A	A	A	A	2R	A	A	1R	A	A	A	0 / 2	1–2	33%
Canada	A	A	A	A	A	A	A	A	1R	A	A	A	A	0 / 1	0–1	0%
Cincinnati	A	A	A	A	A	A	A	A	1R	A	A	A	A	0 / 1	0–1	0%
Win–loss	0–0	0–0	0–0	0–0	0–0	0–0	1–1	0–0	0–2	0–2	0–0	0–0	0–0	0 / 5	1–5	17%

=== Doubles ===
Tournament	1980	1981	1982	1983	1984	1985	1986	1987	1988	1989	1990	1991	SR	W–L	Win %
Grand Slam tournaments
Australian Open	1R	1R	A	1R	SF	3R	A	F	1R	3R	1R	2R	0 / 10	11–10	52%
French Open	A	A	A	A	A	A	A	A	A	2R	A	A	0 / 1	1–1	50%
Wimbledon	1R	Q2	A	Q2	SF	1R	2R	3R	SF	QF	2R	1R	0 / 9	15–9	63%
US Open	A	A	1R	A	2R	2R	A	2R	3R	A	3R	A	0 / 6	7–6	54%
Win–loss	0–2	0–1	0–1	0–1	8–3	2–3	1–1	7–3	6–3	6–3	3–3	1–2	0 / 26	34–26	57%
ATP Masters Series
Indian Wells	A	A	A	A	A	A	A	2R	QF	2R	A	A	0 / 3	4–3	57%
Miami	A	A	A	A	A	3R	A	QF	2R	A	2R	A	0 / 4	0–4	64%
Monte Carlo	A	A	A	A	A	A	A	A	A	2R	A	A	0 / 1	0–1	0%
Hamburg	A	A	A	A	A	A	A	A	A	QF	A	A	0 / 1	2–1	67%
Rome	A	A	A	A	A	A	A	A	A	QF	A	A	0 / 1	2–1	67%
Canada	A	A	A	A	A	A	2R	F	A	A	SF	A	0 / 3	8–3	73%
Cincinnati	A	A	A	A	A	A	2R	QF	2R	A	A	A	0 / 3	4–3	57%
Paris	A	A	A	A	A	A	A	1R	A	A	A	A	0 / 1	0–1	0%
Win–loss	0–0	0–0	0–0	0–0	0–0	2–1	2–2	10–5	4–3	5–4	4–2	0–0	0 / 17	27–17	50%

=== Mixed doubles ===
Tournament	1984	1985	1986	1987	1988	1989	1990	SR	W–L	Win %
Grand Slam tournaments
Australian Open	A	A	A	QF	1R	SF	2R	0 / 4	6–4	60%
French Open	A	A	A	A	A	3R	A	0 / 1	1–1	50%
Wimbledon	3R	3R	A	2R	A	3R	1R	0 / 5	7–5	58%
US Open	A	A	A	1R	A	A	A	0 / 1	0–1	0%
Win–loss	2–1	2–1	0–0	3–3	0–1	6–3	1–2	0 / 11	14–11	56%
