= South Australian Championships =

Defunct tennis tournament
- Event name: South Australian Championships (1889–1976); South Australian Men's Tennis Classic (1977); South Australian Open (1979–1989)
- Tour: Pre open era (1889–1967); Independent tour (1968–1971); Grand Prix circuit (1972–1989)
- Founded: 1889
- Abolished: 1989
- Editions: 88
- Location: Adelaide, South Australia
- Surface: Grass; Hard

The South Australian Championships (1889–1989), also known as the South Australian State Championships and later known as the South Australian Open was an amateur and later a professional men's and women's tennis tournament played originally on outdoor grass courts up to 1987 when it switched to hard courts in its final two years. The tournament was staged at Memorial Drive Park tennis complex in Adelaide, South Australia and was part of the Grand Prix tennis circuit from 1972 until 1989.

== History ==
The origins of the South Australian Championships is thought to be traced back to 1880, however other sources give the start date as 1890 when the Adelaide-based South Australian Tennis Championships, the first known recorded winner of the event was Herbert Hambridge running as part of the men's amateur tour until 1967. The tournament was first staged on courts adjacent to the Adelaide Oval tennis courts, in 1895 it switched to the then newly built Jubilee Exhibition Oval where it remained until 1921. The 1910 edition of the championships staged the Australasian Championships, the champion that year Rodney Heath held the dual titles of Australasian and South Australian Champion. In 1920 the men's South Australian Championships in Adelaide carried the Australasian title in March and was won by Pat O'Hara Wood. In 1921 the tournament moved location to Memorial Drive Park and would continue to be played there until the tournament finished. From 1969 until 1971 the event was part of the ITF independent tour, in 1972 the tournament became part of the Grand Prix tennis circuit, which ran concurrently with other tours as the World Championship Tennis circuit.

The tournament had a chaotic history over the following years, taking place on the professional tour again in 1974, in 1977, as the Marlboro-sponsored South Australian Men's Tennis Classic, and in 1979, as the South Australian Open, before it started a regular run in 1981 under the latter title. Moved from January to December in the Grand Prix circuit calendars of the early 1980s, the South Australian Open sealed its place as the opening event of the season in 1987, when it was scheduled again in January, following the return of the Australian Open as the first Grand Slam event of the year. After the surface change of the Australian Open, the tournament also switched to hard courts, starting with the 1988 edition when the event was concurrently called the Australian Hard Court Championships however this national championship had been staged in rotation at various cities around Australia since 1938. The 1989 edition would be the last event to be called South Australian Open.

== Notes ==
The winners of the 1988 and 1989 editions of this tournament were simultaneously called Australian Hard Court Champion and South Australian Open champion. This occurred when the South Australian tournament switched from grass to hard courts in 1988. The roll of honor for both of these events are different and as such are treated as two different tournaments, with the exception of these years when they were combined titles.

== Past finals ==
=== Men's singles ===
Location	Year	Champions	Runners-up	Score
Adelaide	1889	(Australia) Herbert Hambidge	(Australia) William Hambidge	11–2
Adelaide	1890	(Australia) Herbert Hambidge	(Australia) John Baker	13–10
Adelaide	1891	(Australia) John Baker	(Australia) Herbert Hambidge	13–7
Adelaide	1892	(Australia) John Baker	(Australia) Leo Kaines	14–12
Adelaide	1893	(Australia) David Harbison	(Australia) John Baker	6–0 6–2 6–2
Adelaide	1894	(Australia) Robert George Bowen	(Australia) David Harbison	w.o
Adelaide	1895	(Australia) David Harbison	(Australia) Robert George Bowen	2–6, 6–1, 6–3, 7–5
Adelaide	1896	(Australia) Robert George Bowen	(Australia) David Harbison	6–3, 7–5, 6–4
Adelaide	1897	(Australia) Robert George Bowen	(Australia) Wilfred Lang	6–2, 7–5, 6–2
Adelaide	1898	(Australia) Robert George Bowen	(Australia) Wilfred Lang	6–3, 6–0, 6–1
Adelaide	1899	(Australia) Robert George Bowen	(Australia) David Harbison	6–3 3–6 7–5 6–1
Adelaide	1900	(Australia) Augustus Kearney	(Australia) Robert George Bowen	6–3, 6–2, 6–3
Adelaide	1901	(Australia) Robert George Bowen	(Australia) Cecil Vincent Heath	6–3, 6–3, 6–3
Adelaide	1902	(Australia) Cecil Vincent Heath	(Australia) Robert George Bowen	2–6, 6–2, 6–1, 6–3
Adelaide	1903	(Australia) Joseph Croswell Blair	(Australia) Cecil Vincent Heath	4–6, 6–1 6–4, 6–3
Adelaide	1904	(Australia) Harry Parker	(Australia) David Harbison	8–6, 7–5, 6–1
Adelaide	1905	(Australia) Harry Parker	(Australia) Robert George Bowen	6–0, 6–3, 7–5
Adelaide	1906	(Australia) Norman Brookes	(Australia) Rodney Heath	6–2 6–4 6–2
Adelaide	1907	(Australia) Harry Parker	(Australia) Roy Taylor	6–3,3–6, 6–1, 6–4
Adelaide	1908	(Australia) Harry Parker	(Australia) Robert George Bowen	6–3, 6–4, 6–2
Adelaide	1909	(Australia) Harry Parker	(Australia) Robert George Bowen	3–6, 10–8, 6–2, 6–0
Adelaide	1910	(Australia) Rodney Heath	(Australia) Harry Parker	5–7, 6–4, 6–2, 6–2
Adelaide	1911	(Australia) Harry Parker	(Australia) Roy Taylor	5–7, 6–2, 6–1, 6–2
Adelaide	1912	(Australia) Roy Taylor	(Australia) Horace Rice	6–4, 2–6, 6–4, 1–6, 6–1
Adelaide	1913	(Australia) Roy Taylor	(Australia) Ronald Thomas	6–3, 6–4, 6–2
Adelaide	1914	(Australia) Horace Rice	(Australia) Roy Taylor	6–3, 5–7, 2–6, 6–1, 6–2
Adelaide	1915	(Australia) Horace Rice	(Australia) Ronald Thomas	7–5, 9–7, 2–6, 6–0
Adelaide	1916–18	No event, due to WW1		
Adelaide	1919	(Australia) Roy Taylor	(Australia) Ashley Campbell	6–1, 6–2, 6–1
Adelaide	1920	(Australia) Pat O'Hara Wood	(Australia) Ronald Thomas	6–3, 4–6, 6–8, 6–1, 6–3
Adelaide	1921	(Australia) Gerald Patterson	(Australia) Ronald Thomas	18–16, 6–3, 1-1 ret.
Adelaide	1922	(Australia) Gerald Patterson	(Australia) Pat O'Hara Wood	7–5, 6–2, 2–6, 8–6
Adelaide	1923	(Australia) Gerald Patterson	(Australia) Ian D. McInnes	6–3, 6–4, 7–5
Adelaide	1924	(Australia) Pat O'Hara Wood	(Australia) Garton Hone	6–3, 4–6, 6–1, 6–4
Adelaide	1925	(Australia) Pat O'Hara Wood	(Australia) Richard Schlesinger	2–6, 1–6, 6–3, 7–5, 6–4
Adelaide	1926	(Australia) Ernest Rowe	(Australia) Lum Pao-Hua	6–2, 6–3, 7–5
Adelaide	1927	(Australia) Ernest Rowe	(Australia) Pat O'Hara Wood	5–7, 6–0, 6–3, 6–2
Adelaide	1928	(Australia) Richard Schlesinger	(Australia) Garton Hone	6–3, 6–2, 6–2
Adelaide	1929	(Australia) Jack Crawford	(Australia) Rupert Shepherd	6–1, 6–4, 6–4
Adelaide	1930	(Australia) Don Turnbull	(Australia) Rupert Shepherd	6–4, 7–9, 6–4, 4–6, 7–5
Adelaide	1931	(Australia) Harry Hopman	(Australia) Adrian Quist	6–2, 6–3, 6–3
Adelaide	1932	(Australia) Harry Hopman	(Australia) Adrian Quist	6–2, 6–0, 6–3
Adelaide	1933	(Australia) Harry Hopman	(Australia) Leonard Schwartz	6–4, 5–7, 6–3, 1–6, 10–8
Adelaide	1934	(Australia) Vivian McGrath	(Australia) Adrian Quist	6–2, 4–6, 6–3, 7–5
Adelaide	1935	(Australia) John Bromwich	(Australia) Don Turnbull	6–1, 9–11, 5–7, 6–3, 6–2
Adelaide	1936	(Australia) John Bromwich	(Australia) Don Turnbull	6–2, 11–9, 6–1
Adelaide	1937	(Australia) Adrian Quist	(Australia) Leonard Schwartz	6–4, 6–1, 6–1
Adelaide	1938	(Australia) John Bromwich	(Australia) Leonard Schwartz	9–7, 6–4, 6–1
Adelaide	1939	(Australia) Adrian Quist	(Czechoslovakia) Leonard Schwartz	7–5, 6–4, 6–4
Adelaide	1940	(Australia) Adrian Quist	(Australia) Harry Hopman	6–3, 7–5, 1–6, 6–1
Adelaide	1941	(Australia) Adrian Quist	(Australia) John Bromwich	6–2, 6–4, 6–8, 6–4
Adelaide	1942–45	No event, due to WW2		
Adelaide	1946	(Australia) John Bromwich	(Australia) Frank Sedgman	6–1, 6–3, 6–1
Adelaide	1947	(United States) Gardnar Mulloy	(United States) Bill Talbert	6–3, 8–6, 9–7
Adelaide	1948	(United States) James Brink	(United States) Eddie Moylan	6–4, 6–4, 6–3
Adelaide	1949	(Australia) Geoff Brown	(Australia) Colin Long	5–7, 6–4, 6–0, 6–4
Adelaide	1950	(Australia) Frank Sedgman	(Czech Republic) Jaroslav Drobný	6–1, 6–0, 6–2
Adelaide	1951	(Australia) Frank Sedgman	(United States) Arthur Larsen	6–3, 6–1, 6–3
Adelaide	1952	(Australia) Rex Hartwig	(Australia) Mervyn Rose	11–9, 2–6, 6–2, 9–11, 7–5
Adelaide	1953	(Australia) Mervyn Rose	(United States) Vic Seixas	6–4, 3–6, 6–4, 2–6, 11–9
Adelaide	1954	(United States) Tony Trabert	(Australia) Lew Hoad	6–4, 6–2, 6–2
Adelaide	1955	(United States) Vic Seixas	(Sweden) Lennart Bergelin	6–3, 7–5, 8–6
Adelaide	1956	(Australia) Ken Rosewall	(Australia) Lew Hoad	6–1, 7–5, 6–1
Adelaide	1957	(Australia) Malcolm Anderson	(Australia) Mervyn Rose	7–5, 6–8, 4–6, 6–2, 6–4
Adelaide	1958	(Australia) Roy Emerson	(Australia) Malcolm Anderson	3–6, 12–10, 10–8, 6–2
Adelaide	1959	(Australia) Lew Hoad	(Australia) Frank Sedgman	Professional round robin
Adelaide	1960	(Australia) Roy Emerson	(Australia) Bob Hewitt	6–3, 6–4, 6–3
Adelaide	1961	(Australia) Rod Laver	(United Kingdom) Mike Sangster	11–9, 3–6, 4–6, 14–12, 6–3
Adelaide	1962	(Australia) Roy Emerson	(Australia) John Newcombe	6–4, 6–2, 6–2
Adelaide	1963	(Australia) John Newcombe	(United States) Dennis Ralston	6–1, 6–3, 15–17, 6–1
Adelaide	1964	(Australia) John Newcombe	(Australia) Tony Roche	6–4, 9–7, 7–5
Adelaide	1965	(United States) Arthur Ashe	(Australia) Roy Emerson	7–9, 7–5, 6–0, 6–4
Adelaide	1966	(Australia) John Newcombe	(Australia) Fred Stolle	6–3, 6–3, 7–6
Adelaide	1967	(Australia) John Newcombe	(Australia) Tony Roche	6–4, 6–3, 3–6, 11–9
Adelaide	Open era			
Adelaide	1968	(Australia) Bill Bowrey	(Australia) Allan Stone	6–4, 6–3, 4–6, 6–4
Adelaide	1969	Non-tour event		
Adelaide	1970	(Soviet Union) Alex Metreveli	(Australia) Ken Fletcher	6–3, 4–6, 6–3, 6–2
Adelaide	1971	Non-tour event		
Adelaide	1972	(Soviet Union) Alex Metreveli	(Australia) Kim Warwick	6–3, 6–3, 7–6
Adelaide	1973	(Czechoslovakia) Jiří Hřebec	(Australia) Robert Giltinan	6–4, 2–6, 6–4, 6–2
Adelaide	1974	(Sweden) Björn Borg	(New Zealand) Onny Parun	6–4, 6–4, 3–6, 6–2
Adelaide	1975	(Australia) Syd Ball	(United Kingdom) John Lloyd	6–4, 7–5, 6–3
Adelaide	1976	(Australia) John James	(Australia) Bill Durham	6–4, 6–4
Adelaide	1977	(United States) Victor Amaya	(United States) Brian Teacher	6–1, 6–4
Adelaide	1978	Non-tour event		
Adelaide	1979	(Australia) Kim Warwick	(South Africa) Bernard Mitton	7–5, 6–4
Adelaide	1980	Not held		
Adelaide	1981	(Australia) Mark Edmondson	(Australia) Brad Drewett	7–5, 6–2
Adelaide	1982	(United States) Rod Frawley	(Australia) Chris Johnstone	4–6, 7–6, 6–2
Adelaide	1983	(United States) Mike Bauer	(Czechoslovakia) Miloslav Mečíř	3–6, 6–4, 6–1
Adelaide	1984	(Australia) Peter Doohan	(Netherlands) Huub van Boeckel	1–6, 6–1, 6–4
Adelaide	1985	(South Africa) Eddie Edwards	(Australia) Peter Doohan	6–2, 6–4
Adelaide	1986	Not held		
Adelaide	1987	(Australia) Wally Masur	(United States) Bill Scanlon	6–4, 7–6
Adelaide	1988	(Australia) Mark Woodforde	(Australia) Wally Masur	6–2, 6–4
Adelaide	1989	(Australia) Mark Woodforde	(West Germany) Patrik Kühnen	7–5, 1–6, 7–5

=== Men's doubles ===
Location	Year	Champions	Runners-up	Score
Adelaide	1972	Competition Not Held		
Adelaide	1973	Non-tour event		
Adelaide	1974	(United States) Grover Raz Reid (Australia) Allan Stone	(United States) Mike Estep (Australia) Paul Kronk	7–6, 6–4
Adelaide	1975	Non-tour event		
Adelaide	1976	Non-tour event		
Adelaide	1977	(Australia) Cliff Letcher (United States) Dick Stockton	(Australia) Syd Ball (Australia) Kim Warwick	6–3, 6–4
Adelaide	1978	Non-tour event		
Adelaide	1979	(Australia) Colin Dibley (Australia) John James	(Australia) John Alexander (United States) Phil Dent	6–7, 7–6, 6–4
Adelaide	1980	Non-tour event		
Adelaide	1981	(Australia) Colin Dibley (Australia) Chris Kachel	(South Africa) Eddie Edwards (United States) Craig Edwards	6–3, 6–4
Adelaide	1982	(Australia) Pat Cash (Australia) Chris Johnstone	(Australia) Broderick Dyke (Australia) Wayne Hampson	6–3, 6–7, 7–6
Adelaide	1983	(Australia) Craig Miller (United States) Eric Sherbeck	(Australia) Broderick Dyke (Australia) Rod Frawley	6–3, 4–6, 6–4
Adelaide	1984	(Australia) Broderick Dyke (Australia) Wally Masur	(Australia) Peter Doohan (South Africa) Brian Levine	4–6, 7–5, 6–1
Adelaide	1985	(Australia) Mark Edmondson (Australia) Kim Warwick	(Brazil) Nelson Aerts (United States) Tomm Warneke	6–4, 6–4
Adelaide	1986	Not held		
Adelaide	1987	(Czechoslovakia) Ivan Lendl (United States) Bill Scanlon	(Australia) Peter Doohan (Australia) Laurie Warder	6–7, 6–3, 6–4
Adelaide	1988	(Australia) Darren Cahill (Australia) Mark Kratzmann	(Australia) Carl Limberger (Australia) Mark Woodforde	4–6, 6–2, 7–5
Adelaide	1989	(United Kingdom) Neil Broad (South Africa) Stefan Kruger	(Australia) Mark Kratzmann (United States) Glenn Layendecker	6–2, 7–6

== See also ==
- Australian Hard Court Championships
