= November 27 =

November 27 this year in various calendars
- Friday, 27 November 2026
Akan	Nkyifie
Armenian	10 Kʿaloch 1476
Aztec	Tlacaxipehualiztli 16, 10 Ātl
Babylonian	16 Arakhsamna, 2337 SE
Balinese pawukon	Luang, Pepet, Kajeng, Jaya, Pon, Urukung, Sukra of Kulantir, Guru, Erangan, Duka
Bengali	12 Ogrohayon, BS 1433
Chinese	Yin Wood Snake・Bond Mansion; Fire Horse Year, Month 10, Day 19 (Xiaoxue, 10 days until Daxue)
Common Era	27 November 2026 CE
Coptic	18 Hathor, AM 1743
Egyptian	15 Pharmuthi, 2775 NE
Ethiopian	18 H̱edār, 2019 Amätä Məhrät
French Republican	Décade I, Sextidi de Frimaire de l'Année 235 de la République
Gregorian	27 November, AD 2026
Hebrew	17 Kislev, AM 5787
Hindu	Ārdrā・Sādhya; Solar: 11 Mārgaśīrṣa, 1948 SE; Lunisolar: Tr̥tīyā, Kṛishna pakṣa of Kārtika, 2083 VE; Rāudra・5127 KY・1,872,906
Icelandic	Föstudagur, 5 Ýlir 2026
Islamic	16 Jumada al-thani, AH 1448 (using tabular method)
ISO week date	2026-W48-5
Japanese	19 Kannazuki, Reiwa 8 (Shōsetsu, 10 days until Taisetsu)
Julian	14 November, AD 2026 (AM 7535)
Julian day	2461372
Korean	19 Dwaejidal, 4359 DE
Maya	13.0.14.2.9; 2 Mac, 10 Muluc
Roman	ante diem XVIII Kalendas Decembres, MMDCCLXXIX AUC
Solar Hijri	6 Azar, SH 1405
Tibetan	18 smin drug, me pho rta 2153 or 1772 or 1000

<<	November					>>
Su	Mo	Tu	We	Th	Fr	Sa
1	2	3	4	5	6	7
8	9	10	11	12	13	14
15	16	17	18	19	20	21
22	23	24	25	26	27	28
29	30
2026

November 27 in recent years
2025 (Thursday)
2024 (Wednesday)
2023 (Monday)
2022 (Sunday)
2021 (Saturday)
2020 (Friday)
2019 (Wednesday)
2018 (Tuesday)
2017 (Monday)
2016 (Sunday)

November 27 is the 331st day of the year (332nd in leap years) in the Gregorian calendar; 34 days remain until the end of the year.

== Events ==
=== Pre-1600 ===
- BC 43 – The Lex Titia, which grants special powers to the second Triumvirate, is passed by the Roman assembly.
- AD 25 – Luoyang is declared capital of the Eastern Han dynasty by Emperor Guangwu of Han.
- 176 – Emperor Marcus Aurelius grants his son Commodus the rank of "Imperator" and makes him Supreme Commander of the Roman legions.
- 395 – Rufinus, praetorian prefect of the East, is murdered by Gothic mercenaries under Gainas.
- 399 – Election of pope Anastasius I following the death of pope Siricius the day prior.
- 511 – King Clovis I dies at Lutetia and is buried in the Abbey of St Genevieve.
- 602 – Byzantine Emperor Maurice and his sons are beheaded by officers of the usurper Phocas and subsequently burried at the monastery of St. Mamas.
- 1095 – Pope Urban II declares the First Crusade at the Council of Clermont.
- 1237 – Frederick II, Holy Roman Emperor, defeats the Lombard League in the battle of Cortenuova.
- 1382 – Al-Salih Hajji, the last Qalawunid sultan, is deposed by Barquq, ending the long Turkic Bahri Mamluk period in general and particularly the Qalawunid dynasty, and beginning the reign of the Circassian Burji Mamluk.
- 1542 – Palace plot of Renyin year: A group of Ming dynasty palace women fail to murder the Jiajing Emperor, and are executed by slow-slicing.

=== 1601–1900 ===
- 1727 – The foundation stone to the Jerusalem Church in Berlin is laid.
- 1755 – An earthquake in northern Morocco devastates the cities of Fes and Meknes.
- 1809 – The Berners Street hoax is perpetrated by Theodore Hook in the City of Westminster, London.
- 1815 – Adoption of the Constitution of the Kingdom of Poland.
- 1830 – Saint Catherine Labouré experiences a Marian apparition.
- 1835 – James Pratt and John Smith are hanged in London; they are the last two to be executed for sodomy in England.
- 1839 – In Boston, Massachusetts, the American Statistical Association is founded.
- 1840 – Muhammad Ali of Egypt accepts the London Convention of 1840 in which he renounces his claims to Syria, Crete, and Hejaz in exchange for recognition of his hereditary rule of Egypt and Syria.
- 1856 – The Coup of 1856 leads to Luxembourg's unilateral adoption of a new, reactionary constitution.
- 1863 – American Civil War: Confederate cavalry leader John Hunt Morgan and several of his men escape the Ohio Penitentiary and return safely to the South.
- 1863 – American Civil War: Battle of Mine Run: Union forces under General George Meade take up positions against troops led by Confederate General Robert E. Lee.
- 1868 – American Indian Wars: Battle of Washita River: United States Army Lieutenant Colonel George Armstrong Custer leads an attack on Cheyenne living on reservation land.
- 1879 – War of the Pacific: Battle of Tarapacá: The confrontation between the Chilean Army and the Peruvian Army takes place in Tarapacá, the Peruvian victory is consummated with the death of the 2 generals and the capture the Chilean general in said place of battle, headed by the Peruvian victory of General Juan Buendía y Noregia.
- 1895 – At the Swedish–Norwegian Club in Paris, Alfred Nobel signs his last will and testament, setting aside his estate to establish the Nobel Prize after he dies.
- 1896 – Also sprach Zarathustra by Richard Strauss is first performed.

=== 1901–present ===
- 1901 – The U.S. Army War College is established.
- 1912 – Spain declares a protectorate over the north shore of Morocco.
- 1917 – P. E. Svinhufvud becomes the chairman of his first senate, technically the first Prime Minister of Finland.
- 1918 – The Makhnovshchina is established.
- 1924 – In New York City, the first Macy's Thanksgiving Day Parade is held.
- 1940 – In Romania, the ruling Iron Guard fascist party assassinates over 60 of arrested King Carol II of Romania's aides and other political dissidents.
- 1940 – World War II: At the Battle of Cape Spartivento, the Royal Navy engages the Regia Marina in the Mediterranean Sea.
- 1942 – World War II: At Toulon, the French navy scuttles its ships and submarines to keep them out of Nazi hands.
- 1944 – World War II: RAF Fauld explosion: An explosion at a Royal Air Force ammunition dump in Staffordshire kills seventy people.
- 1945 – CARE (then the Cooperative for American Remittances to Europe) is founded to send CARE Packages of food relief to Europe after World War II.
- 1954 – Alger Hiss is released from prison after serving 44 months for perjury.
- 1965 – Vietnam War: The Pentagon tells U.S. President Lyndon B. Johnson that if planned operations are to succeed, the number of American troops in Vietnam has to be increased from 120,000 to 400,000.
- 1968 – Penny Ann Early becomes the first woman to play in a major professional men's basketball league, for the Kentucky Colonels in an ABA game against the Los Angeles Stars.
- 1971 – The Soviet space program's Mars 2 orbiter releases a descent module. It malfunctions and crashes, but it is the first man-made object to reach the surface of Mars.
- 1973 – Twenty-fifth Amendment: The United States Senate votes 92–3 to confirm Gerald Ford as Vice President of the United States. (On December 6, the House will confirm him 387–35).
- 1975 – The Provisional IRA assassinates Ross McWhirter, after a press conference in which McWhirter had announced a reward for the capture of those responsible for multiple bombings and shootings across England.
- 1978 – In San Francisco, city mayor George Moscone and openly gay city supervisor Harvey Milk are assassinated by former supervisor Dan White.
- 1978 – The Kurdistan Workers' Party (PKK) is founded in the Turkish village of Fis.
- 1983 – Avianca Flight 011: A Boeing 747 crashes near Madrid's Barajas Airport, killing 181.
- 1984 – Under the Brussels Agreement signed between the governments of the United Kingdom and Spain, the former agrees to enter into discussions with Spain over Gibraltar, including sovereignty.
- 1985 – Space Shuttle program: Atlantis launches on STS-61-B, with Rodolfo Neri Vela becoming the first Mexican astronaut.
- 1989 – Avianca Flight 203: A Boeing 727 explodes in mid-air over Colombia, killing all 107 people on board and three people on the ground. The Medellín Cartel claimed responsibility for the attack.
- 1992 – For the second time in a year, military forces try to overthrow president Carlos Andrés Pérez in Venezuela.
- 1997 – Twenty-five people are killed in the second Souhane massacre in Algeria.
- 1999 – The centre-left Labour Party takes control of the New Zealand government with leader Helen Clark becoming the first elected female prime minister in New Zealand's history.
- 2001 – A hydrogen atmosphere is discovered on the extrasolar planet Osiris by the Hubble Space Telescope, the first atmosphere detected on an extrasolar planet.
- 2004 – Pope John Paul II returns the relics of Saint John Chrysostom to the Eastern Orthodox Church.
- 2004 – Blackwater 61 crash: A CASA C-212 Aviocar crashes into the Koh-i-Baba mountain range in Afghanistan, killing six.
- 2006 – The House of Commons of Canada approves a motion introduced by Prime Minister Stephen Harper recognizing the Québécois as a nation within Canada.
- 2008 – XL Airways Germany Flight 888T: An Airbus A320 performing a flight test crashes near the French commune of Canet-en-Roussillon, killing all seven people on board.
- 2009 – Nevsky Express bombing: A bomb explodes on the Nevsky Express train between Moscow and Saint Petersburg, derailing it and causing 28 deaths and 96 injuries.
- 2015 – An active shooter inside a Planned Parenthood facility in Colorado Springs, Colorado, shoots at least four police officers. One officer later dies. Two civilians are also killed, and six injured. The shooter later surrendered.
- 2020 – Iran's top nuclear scientist, Mohsen Fakhrizadeh, is assassinated near Tehran.
- 2020 – Days after the announcement of its discovery, the Utah monolith is removed by recreationists.
- 2024 – Syrian rebel groups led by Hay'at Tahrir al-Sham launch a ground offensive into Syria.

== Births ==
=== Pre-1600 ===
- 111 – Antinous, Greek favourite of Hadrian (died 130)
- 1127 – Emperor Xiaozong of Song (died 1194)
- 1380 – King Ferdinand I of Aragon (died 1416)
- 1422 – Gaston IV, Count of Foix, French nobleman (died 1472)
- 1548 – Jacopo Mazzoni, Italian philosopher (died 1598)
- 1558 – Mingyi Swa, Crown Prince of Burma (died 1593)
- 1576 – Shimazu Tadatsune, Japanese daimyō (died 1638)
- 1582 – Pierre Dupuy, French historian and scholar (died 1651)
- 1586 – Sir John Wray, 2nd Baronet, English politicians and Roundheads supporter (died 1655)

=== 1601–1900 ===
- 1630 – Sigismund Francis, Archduke of Austria (died 1665)
- 1635 – Françoise d'Aubigné, Marquise de Maintenon, second wife of Louis XIV of France (died 1719)
- 1640 – Barbara Palmer, 1st Duchess of Cleveland (died 1709)
- 1701 – Anders Celsius, Swedish astronomer, physicist, and mathematician (died 1744)
- 1710 – Robert Lowth, English bishop and academic (died 1787)
- 1746 – Robert R. Livingston, American lawyer and politician, 1st United States Secretary for Foreign Affairs (died 1813)
- 1746 – Increase Sumner, American lawyer, jurist, and politician, 5th Governor of Massachusetts (died 1799)
- 1754 – Georg Forster, German-Polish ethnologist and journalist (died 1794)
- 1759 – Franz Krommer, Czech violinist and composer (died 1831)
- 1779 – Aimé, duc de Clermont-Tonnerre, French general and politician, French Minister of Defence (died 1865)
- 1798 – Andries Pretorius, Boer leader after whom Pretoria was named, Prime Minister of the Natalia Republic (died 1853)
- 1804 – Julius Benedict, German-English conductor and composer (died 1885)
- 1809 – Fanny Kemble, English actress, playwright, and poet (died 1893)
- 1814 – Charles-François-Frédéric, marquis de Montholon-Sémonville, French politician and diplomat, French ambassador to the United States (died 1886)
- 1820 – Rachel Brooks Gleason, fourth woman to earn a medical degree in the United States (died 1905)
- 1823 – James Service, Scottish-Australian politician, 12th Premier of Victoria (died 1899)
- 1833 – Princess Mary Adelaide of Cambridge (died 1897)
- 1841 – Nikoline Harbitz, Norwegian author (died 1898)
- 1843 – Cornelius Vanderbilt II, American businessman (died 1899)
- 1845 – Frederic Crowninshield, American artist and author (died 1918)
- 1853 – Frank Dicksee, English painter and illustrator (died 1928)
- 1857 – Charles Scott Sherrington, English physiologist, bacteriologist, and pathologist, Nobel Prize laureate (died 1952)
- 1859 – William Bliss Baker, American painter (died 1886)
- 1862 – Katherine Sleeper Walden, American environmental activist (died 1949)
- 1865 – Janez Evangelist Krek, Slovene priest, journalist, and politician (died 1917)
- 1867 – Charles Koechlin, French composer and educator (died 1950)
- 1870 – Juho Kusti Paasikivi, Finnish academic and politician, 7th President of Finland (died 1956)
- 1871 – Giovanni Giorgi, Italian physicist and engineer (died 1950)
- 1874 – Charles A. Beard, American historian, author, and educator, co-founded The New School (died 1948)
- 1874 – Chaim Weizmann, Belarusian-Israeli chemist and politician, 1st President of Israel (died 1952)
- 1875 – Julius Lenhart, Austrian gymnast (died 1962)
- 1877 – Katharine Anthony, American biographer (died 1965)
- 1878 – Jatindramohan Bagchi, Indian poet and critic (died 1948)
- 1878 – Charles Dvorak, American pole vaulter and coach (died 1969)
- 1885 – Daniel Mendaille, French actor (died 1963)
- 1885 – Liviu Rebreanu, Romanian author and playwright (died 1944)
- 1886 – Tsuguharu Foujita, Japanese–French painter and printmaker (died 1968)
- 1887 – Masaharu Homma, Japanese general (died 1946)
- 1888 – Ganesh Vasudev Mavalankar, Indian activist and politician, 1st Speaker of the Lok Sabha (died 1956)
- 1894 – Konosuke Matsushita, Japanese businessman, founded Panasonic (died 1989)
- 1894 – Katherine Milhous, American author and illustrator (died 1977)
- 1894 – Amphilochius of Pochayiv, Ukrainian monk and saint (died 1971)
- 1898 – Fredric Warburg, English author and publisher (died 1981)
- 1900 – Jovette Bernier, Canadian journalist, author, and radio show host (died 1981)

=== 1901–present ===
- 1901 – Ted Husing, American sportscaster (died 1962)
- 1903 – Lars Onsager, Norwegian-American chemist and physicist, Nobel Prize laureate (died 1976)
- 1905 – Astrid Allwyn, American actress (died 1978)
- 1907 – Harivansh Rai Bachchan, Indian poet and author (died 2003)
- 1907 – L. Sprague de Camp, American historian and author (died 2000)
- 1909 – James Agee, American novelist, screenwriter, and critic (died 1955)
- 1909 – Anatoly Maltsev, Russian mathematician and theorist (died 1967)
- 1911 – Fe del Mundo, Filipino pediatrician and educator (died 2011)
- 1911 – David Merrick, American director and producer (died 2000)
- 1912 – Connie Sawyer, American actress (died 2018)
- 1916 – Chick Hearn, American sportscaster and actor (died 2002)
- 1917 – Buffalo Bob Smith, American actor and television host (died 1998)
- 1918 – Stephen Elliott, American actor (died 2005)
- 1920 – Abe Lenstra, Dutch footballer (died 1985)
- 1920 – Buster Merryfield, English actor (died 1999)
- 1920 – Cal Worthington, Automobile dealer and television personality (died 2013)
- 1921 – Dora Dougherty Strother, American pilot and academic (died 2013)
- 1921 – Alexander Dubček, Slovak soldier and politician (died 1992)
- 1922 – Hall Bartlett, American director, producer, and screenwriter (died 1993)
- 1922 – Nicholas Magallanes, American principal dancer and charter member of the New York City Ballet (died 1977)
- 1923 – J. Ernest Wilkins Jr., American nuclear scientist, mechanical engineer and mathematician (died 2011)
- 1925 – Derroll Adams, American folk singer-songwriter and musician (died 2000)
- 1925 – John Maddox, Welsh chemist, physicist, and journalist (died 2009)
- 1925 – Marshall Thompson, American actor, director, and screenwriter (died 1992)
- 1925 – Ernie Wise, English actor, comedian, singer, and screenwriter (died 1999)
- 1926 – Chae Myung-shin, South Korean general (died 2013)
- 1927 – Carlos José Castilho, Brazilian footballer and manager (died 1987)
- 1927 – William E. Simon, American soldier and politician, 63rd United States Secretary of the Treasury (died 2000)
- 1928 – Alekos Alexandrakis, Greek actor and director (died 2005)
- 1928 – Josh Kirby, English painter and illustrator (died 2001)
- 1929 – Alan Simpson, English screenwriter and producer (died 2017)
- 1930 – Joe DeNardo, American meteorologist (died 2018)
- 1930 – Dick Poole, Australian rugby league player and coach (died 2025)
- 1930 – Rex Shelley, Singaporean engineer and author (died 2009)
- 1932 – Benigno Aquino Jr., Filipino journalist and politician (died 1983)
- 1933 – Jacques Godbout, Canadian journalist, author, director, and screenwriter
- 1933 – Gordon S. Wood, American historian and academic (died 2026)
- 1934 – Ammo Baba, Iraqi footballer and manager (died 2009)
- 1934 – Al Jackson, Jr., American drummer, songwriter, and producer (died 1975)
- 1934 – Gilbert Strang, American mathematician and academic
- 1935 – Les Blank, American director and producer (died 2013)
- 1935 – Daniel Charles, French musicologist and philosopher (died 2008)
- 1935 – Willie Pastrano, American boxer (died 1997)
- 1936 – Gail Sheehy, American journalist and author (died 2020)
- 1938 – John Ashworth, English biologist and academic (died 2025)
- 1938 – Apolo Nsibambi, Ugandan academic and politician, Prime Minister of Uganda (died 2019)
- 1939 – Dave Giusti, American baseball player and manager (died 2026)
- 1939 – Laurent-Désiré Kabila, Congolese politician, President of the Democratic Republic of the Congo (died 2001)
- 1939 – Buzz Cason, American singer and songwriter (died 2024)
- 1940 – Bruce Lee, American-Chinese actor, martial artist, and screenwriter (died 1973)
- 1941 – Henry Carr, American football player and sprinter (died 2015)
- 1941 – Aimé Jacquet, French footballer, coach, and manager
- 1941 – Eddie Rabbitt, American singer-songwriter and guitarist (died 1998)
- 1941 – Louis van Dijk, Dutch pianist (died 2020)
- 1942 – Marilyn Hacker, American poet and critic
- 1942 – Jimi Hendrix, American singer-songwriter, guitarist, and producer (died 1970)
- 1943 – Nicole Brossard, Canadian author and poet
- 1943 – Jil Sander, German fashion designer
- 1944 – Mickey Leland, American activist and politician (died 1989)
- 1945 – James Avery, American actor (died 2013)
- 1945 – Phil Bloom, Dutch model and actress
- 1945 – Randy Brecker, American trumpeter and flugelhornist
- 1945 – Alain de Cadenet, English race car driver (died 2022)
- 1945 – Benigno Fitial, Mariana Islander businessman and politician, 7th Governor of the Northern Mariana Islands
- 1945 – Simon Townsend, Australian journalist and television host (died 2025)
- 1946 – Richard Codey, American politician, 53rd Governor of New Jersey (died 2026)
- 1946 – Ismaïl Omar Guelleh, Ethiopian-Djiboutian lawyer and politician, President of Djibouti
- 1947 – Neil Rosenshein, American tenor and actor
- 1949 – Jim Price, American basketball player and coach
- 1949 – Masanori Sekiya, Japanese race car driver
- 1950 – Gavyn Davies, English journalist and businessman
- 1951 – Kathryn Bigelow, American director, producer, and screenwriter
- 1951 – Vera Fischer, Brazilian actress, Miss Brasil 1969
- 1951 – Gunnar Graps, Estonian singer and guitarist (died 2004)
- 1952 – Sheila Copps, Canadian journalist and politician, 6th Deputy Prime Minister of Canada
- 1952 – Bappi Lahiri, Indian singer-songwriter and producer (died 2022)
- 1952 – Jim Wetherbee, American captain, engineer, and astronaut
- 1953 – Curtis Armstrong, American actor, singer, and producer
- 1953 – Steve Bannon, American media executive and political figure
- 1953 – Boris Grebenshchikov, Russian singer-songwriter and guitarist
- 1953 – Tarmo Kõuts, Estonian admiral and politician
- 1953 – Lyle Mays, American keyboardist and composer (died 2020)
- 1953 – Richard Stone, American composer (died 2001)
- 1954 – Arthur Smith, English comedian, actor, and screenwriter
- 1955 – Pierre Mondou, Canadian ice hockey player
- 1955 – Bill Nye, American engineer, educator, and television host
- 1956 – William Fichtner, American actor
- 1956 – John McCarthy, English journalist and author
- 1956 – Nazrin Shah of Perak, Sultan of Perak
- 1957 – Kenny Acheson, Northern Irish race car driver
- 1957 – Edda Heiðrún Backman, Icelandic actress, singer, director and artist (died 2016)
- 1957 – Frank Boeijen, Dutch singer-songwriter and guitarist
- 1957 – Caroline Kennedy, American lawyer and diplomat, 27th United States Ambassador to Australia, daughter of President John F. Kennedy
- 1957 – Callie Khouri, American director, producer, and screenwriter
- 1957 – Michael A. Stackpole, American game designer and author
- 1958 – Tetsuya Komuro, Japanese singer-songwriter, and producer
- 1958 – Mike Scioscia, American baseball player and manager
- 1959 – Charlie Burchill, Scottish guitarist and songwriter
- 1959 – Viktoria Mullova, Russian violinist
- 1960 – Kevin Henkes, American author and illustrator
- 1960 – Ken O'Brien, American football player and coach
- 1960 – Tim Pawlenty, American lawyer and politician, 39th Governor of Minnesota
- 1960 – Michael Rispoli, American actor
- 1960 – Maria Schneider, American composer and musician
- 1960 – Yulia Tymoshenko, Ukrainian economist and politician, 10th Prime Minister of Ukraine
- 1960 – Gianni Vernetti, Italian lawyer and politician
- 1961 – Samantha Bond, English actress
- 1961 – Steve Oedekerk, American actor, director, and screenwriter
- 1962 – Charlie Benante, American drummer and songwriter
- 1962 – Mike Bordin, American drummer
- 1962 – Davey Boy Smith, English-Canadian wrestler (died 2002)
- 1963 – Fisher Stevens, American actor, director, and producer
- 1964 – Robin Givens, American actress
- 1964 – Roberto Mancini, Italian footballer and manager
- 1964 – Hisayuki Sasaki, Japanese golfer (died 2013)
- 1965 – Danielle Ammaccapane, American golfer
- 1966 – Andy Merrill, American television writer, producer and voice actor
- 1968 – Al Barrow, English bass guitarist
- 1968 – Michael Vartan, French-American actor
- 1969 – El Chombo, Panamanian singer-songwriter
- 1969 – Ruth George, English politician
- 1969 – Damian Hinds, English politician
- 1969 – Myles Kennedy, American singer-songwriter
- 1969 – Elizabeth Marvel, American actress
- 1970 – Kelly Loeffler, American politician and businesswoman
- 1970 – Han Kang, South Korean writer
- 1970 – Markus Vogl, Austrian politician
- 1971 – Kirk Acevedo, American actor
- 1971 – Larry Allen, American football player (died 2024)
- 1971 – Iván Rodríguez, Puerto Rican-American baseball player
- 1971 – Nick Van Exel, American basketball player and coach
- 1972 – Shane Salerno, American screenwriter and producer
- 1973 – Sharlto Copley, South African actor
- 1973 – Samantha Harris, American model and television host
- 1973 – Evan Karagias, American wrestler and actor
- 1973 – Jin Katagiri, Japanese comedian, actor, sculptor, and potter
- 1973 – Jon Runyan, American football player and politician
- 1973 – Twista, American rapper and producer
- 1974 – Wendy Houvenaghel, Northern Irish racing cyclist
- 1974 – Alec Newman, Scottish actor
- 1975 – Bad Azz, American rapper (died 2019)
- 1975 – Martín Gramática, Argentine-American football player
- 1975 – Rain Vessenberg, Estonian footballer
- 1976 – Jean Grae, South African-American rapper and producer
- 1976 – Chad Kilger, Canadian ice hockey player and firefighter
- 1976 – Jaleel White, American actor and screenwriter
- 1977 – Willie Bloomquist, American baseball player
- 1977 – Bendor Grosvenor, British art historian
- 1977 – Andy Panko, American basketball player
- 1978 – Eszter Molnár, Hungarian tennis player
- 1978 – Jimmy Rollins, American baseball player
- 1978 – Mike Skinner, English rapper and producer
- 1978 – Radek Štěpánek, Czech tennis player
- 1979 – Ricky Carmichael, American motocross racer
- 1979 – Hilary Hahn, American violinist
- 1979 – Brendan Haywood, American basketball player
- 1979 – Teemu Tainio, Finnish footballer
- 1980 – Jackie Greene, American singer-songwriter and guitarist
- 1980 – Veronika Portsmuth, Estonian singer and conductor
- 1980 – Michael Yardy, English cricketer
- 1981 – Bruno Alves, Portuguese footballer
- 1981 – Ryan Jimmo, Canadian mixed martial artist (died 2016)
- 1981 – Matthew Taylor, English footballer
- 1982 – David Bellion, French footballer
- 1982 – Aleksandr Kerzhakov, Russian footballer
- 1982 – Tommy Robinson, English activist, co-founded the English Defence League
- 1983 – Professor Green, English rapper
- 1983 – Henrik Karlsson, Swedish-Kazakhstani ice hockey player
- 1983 – Donta Smith, American-Venezuelan basketball player
- 1984 – Leslie Dewan, American entrepreneur
- 1984 – Izumi Kitta, Japanese voice actress and singer
- 1984 – Domata Peko, American football player
- 1985 – Park Soo-jin, South Korean singer
- 1985 – Alison Pill, Canadian actress
- 1985 – Thilo Versick, German footballer
- 1986 – Suresh Kumar Raina, Indian cricketer
- 1986 – Steven Silva, American-Filipino footballer
- 1986 – Xavi Torres, Spanish footballer
- 1986 – Oritsé Williams, English singer-songwriter, producer, and dancer
- 1987 – Luigi Datome, Italian basketball player
- 1987 – Lashana Lynch, English actress
- 1989 – Michael Floyd, American football player
- 1989 – Freddie Sears, English footballer
- 1990 – Josh Dubovie, English singer
- 1992 – Ala Boratyn, Polish singer-songwriter
- 1992 – Chanyeol, South Korean rapper, singer, songwriter, actor and model
- 1992 – Bradley Zimmer, American baseball player
- 1993 – Aubrey Peeples, American actress and singer
- 1995 – Suliasi Vunivalu, Fijian rugby league player
- 1996 – Mike Williams, Dutch DJ and record producer
- 2001 – Zoe Colletti, American actress
- 2003 – Adéla Jergová, Slovak singer-songwriter

== Deaths ==
=== Pre-1600 ===
- 8 BC – Horace, Roman soldier and poet (born 65 BC)
- 395 – Rufinus, Roman politician (born 335)
- 450 – Galla Placidia, Roman Empress (born 392)
- 511 – Clovis I, king of the Franks
- 602 – Maurice, Byzantine emperor (born 539)
- 639 – Acarius, bishop of Doornik and Noyon
- 1198 – Constance, Queen of Sicily (born 1154)
- 1252 – Blanche of Castile (born 1188)
- 1346 – Saint Gregory of Sinai (born c. 1260)
- 1382 – Philip van Artevelde, Flemish patriot (born 1340)
- 1474 – Guillaume Du Fay, French composer and music theorist (born 1397)
- 1570 – Jacopo Sansovino, Italian sculptor and architect (born 1486)
- 1592 – Nakagawa Hidemasa, Japanese commander (born 1568)

=== 1601–1900 ===
- 1620 – Francis, Duke of Pomerania-Stettin, Bishop of Cammin (born 1577)
- 1632 – John Eliot, English politician (born 1592)
- 1703 – Henry Winstanley, English painter and engineer (born 1644)
- 1754 – Abraham de Moivre, French-English mathematician and theorist (born 1667)
- 1811 – Andrew Meikle, Scottish engineer, designed the threshing machine (born 1719)
- 1819 – Gustavus Conyngham, Irish-born American merchant sea captain, an officer in the Continental Navy and a privateer.
- 1822 – Old Billy, English barge horse, oldest recorded horse (born 1760)
- 1830 – André Parmentier, Belgian-American architect (born 1780)
- 1852 – Ada Lovelace, English mathematician and computer scientist (born 1815)
- 1875 – Richard Christopher Carrington, English astronomer and educator (born 1826)
- 1881 – Theobald Boehm, German flute player and composer (born 1794)
- 1884 – Fanny Elssler, Austrian ballerina (born 1810)
- 1890 – Mahatma Phule, Indian Activist (born 1827)
- 1895 – Alexandre Dumas, fils, French novelist and playwright (born 1824)
- 1899 – Constant Fornerod, Swiss academic and politician, 10th President of the Swiss Council of States (born 1819)

=== 1901–present ===
- 1901 – Clement Studebaker, American businessman, co-founded Studebaker (born 1831)
- 1908 – Jean Albert Gaudry, French geologist and palaeontologist (born 1827)
- 1916 – Emile Verhaeren, Belgian poet and playwright (born 1855)
- 1919 – Manuel Espinosa Batista, Panamanian pharmacist and politician (born 1857)
- 1920 – Alexius Meinong, Ukrainian-Austrian philosopher and author (born 1853)
- 1921 – Douglas Cameron, Canadian contractor and politician, 8th Lieutenant Governor of Manitoba (born 1854)
- 1921 – Mary Grant Roberts, Australian zoo owner (born 1841)
- 1930 – Simon Kahquados, Potawatomi political activist (born 1851)
- 1931 – Lya De Putti, Slovak-American actress (born 1899)
- 1934 – Baby Face Nelson, American criminal (born 1908)
- 1936 – Basil Zaharoff, Greek-French businessman and philanthropist (born 1849)
- 1940 – Nicolae Iorga, Romanian historian and politician, 34th Prime Minister of Romania (born 1871)
- 1943 – Ivo Lola Ribar, Croatian soldier and politician (born 1916)
- 1944 – Leonid Mandelstam, Russian physicist and academic (born 1879)
- 1953 – Eugene O'Neill, American playwright, Nobel Prize laureate (born 1888)
- 1955 – Arthur Honegger, French-Swiss composer and academic (born 1892)
- 1958 – Georgi Damyanov, Bulgarian politician, Head of State of Bulgaria (born 1892)
- 1958 – Artur Rodziński, Polish-American conductor (born 1892)
- 1960 – Frederick Fane, Irish-English cricketer (born 1875)
- 1960 – Dirk Jan de Geer, Dutch lawyer and politician, Prime Minister of the Netherlands (born 1870)
- 1962 – August Lass, Estonian footballer (born 1903)
- 1967 – Léon M'ba, Gabonese politician, 1st President of Gabon (born 1902)
- 1969 – May Gibbs, English Australian children's author, illustrator, and cartoonist, (born 1877)
- 1970 – Helene Madison, American swimmer and nurse (born 1913)
- 1973 – Frank Christian, American trumpet player (born 1887)
- 1975 – Alberto Massimino, Italian automotive engineer (born 1895)
- 1975 – Ross McWhirter, English author and activist, co-founded the Guinness Book of Records (born 1925)
- 1977 – Mart Laga, Estonian basketball player (born 1936)
- 1978 – Harvey Milk, American lieutenant and politician (born 1930)
- 1978 – George Moscone, American lawyer and politician, 37th Mayor of San Francisco (born 1929)
- 1980 – F. Burrall Hoffman, American architect, designed the Villa Vizcaya (born 1882)
- 1981 – Lotte Lenya, Austrian singer and actress (born 1898)
- 1985 – Rendra Karno, Indonesian actor (born 1920)
- 1986 – Steve Tracy, American actor (b, 1952)
- 1988 – John Carradine, American actor (born 1906)
- 1988 – Jan Hein Donner, Dutch chess player and author (born 1927)
- 1989 – Carlos Arias Navarro, Spanish politician, Prime Minister of Spain (born 1908)
- 1990 – David White, American actor (born 1916)
- 1990 – Basilis C. Xanthopoulos, Greek physicist and academic (born 1951)
- 1992 – Ivan Generalić, Croatian painter (born 1914)
- 1994 – Fernando Lopes-Graça, Portuguese composer and conductor (born 1906)
- 1997 – Buck Leonard, American baseball player and educator (born 1907)
- 1998 – Barbara Acklin, American singer-songwriter (born 1943)
- 1998 – Gloria Fuertes, Spanish poet and author of children's literature (born 1917)
- 1999 – Yasuhiro Kojima, Japanese-American wrestler and trainer (born 1937)
- 1999 – Alain Peyrefitte, French scholar and politician, French Minister of Justice (born 1925)
- 1999 – Elizabeth Gray Vining, American author and librarian (born 1902)
- 2000 – Malcolm Bradbury, English author and academic (born 1932)
- 2000 – Uno Prii, Estonian-Canadian architect (born 1924)
- 2000 – Len Shackleton, English footballer and journalist (born 1922)
- 2002 – Billie Bird, American actress (born 1908)
- 2002 – Shivmangal Singh Suman, Indian poet and academic (born 1915)
- 2005 – Jocelyn Brando, American actress (born 1919)
- 2005 – Joe Jones, American singer-songwriter (born 1926)
- 2006 – Don Butterfield, American tuba player (born 1923)
- 2006 – Bebe Moore Campbell, American author and educator (born 1950)
- 2006 – Casey Coleman, American sportscaster (born 1951)
- 2007 – Bernie Banton, Australian activist (born 1946)
- 2007 – Robert Cade, American physician and academic, co-invented Gatorade (born 1927)
- 2007 – Sean Taylor, American football player (born 1983)
- 2007 – Bill Willis, American football player and coach (born 1921)
- 2008 – V. P. Singh, Indian lawyer and politician, 7th Prime Minister of India (born 1931)
- 2009 – Al Alberts, American singer-songwriter (born 1922)
- 2010 – Irvin Kershner, American actor, director, and producer (born 1923)
- 2011 – Len Fulford, English photographer and director (born 1928)
- 2011 – Ken Russell, English actor, director, producer, and screenwriter (born 1927)
- 2011 – Gary Speed, Welsh footballer and manager (born 1969)
- 2012 – Mickey Baker, American guitarist (born 1925)
- 2012 – Ab Fafié, Dutch footballer and manager (born 1941)
- 2012 – Érik Izraelewicz, French journalist and author (born 1954)
- 2012 – Marvin Miller, American businessman and union leader (born 1917)
- 2012 – Jack Wishna, American photographer and businessman, co-founded Rockcityclub (born 1958)
- 2013 – Lewis Collins, English-American actor (born 1946)
- 2013 – Herbert F. DeSimone, American lawyer and politician, Attorney General of Rhode Island (born 1929)
- 2013 – Volker Roemheld, German physiologist and biologist (born 1941)
- 2013 – Nílton Santos, Brazilian footballer (born 1925)
- 2013 – Manuel F. Segura, Filipino colonel (born 1919)
- 2014 – Wanda Błeńska, Polish physician and missionary (born 1911)
- 2014 – Phillip Hughes, Australian cricketer (born 1988)
- 2014 – P. D. James, English author (born 1920)
- 2014 – Jack Kyle, Irish rugby player and humanitarian (born 1926)
- 2014 – Fernance B. Perry, Portuguese-American businessman and philanthropist (born 1922)
- 2015 – Mark Behr, Tanzanian-South African author and academic (born 1963)
- 2015 – Maurice Strong, Canadian businessman and diplomat (born 1929)
- 2015 – Garrett Swasey, American figure skater and coach (born 1971)
- 2015 – Philippe Washer, Belgian tennis player and golfer (born 1924)
- 2016 – Ioannis Grivas, Greek statesman (born 1923)
- 2020 – Mohsen Fakhrizadeh, Iranian nuclear scientist (born 1958)
- 2021 – Apetor, Norwegian YouTuber (born 1964)
- 2024 – Mary McGee, American motorcycle racer (born 1936)

== Holidays and observances ==
- Christian feast day:
  - Acarius of Tournai
  - Bilihildis of Altmünster
  - Blessed Bronisław Kostkowski
  - Congar of Congresbury
  - Facundus and Primitivus
  - Fergus**Blessed Margaret of Lorraine
  - James Intercisus
  - Our Lady of the Miraculous Medal (Roman Catholic)
  - Secundinus
  - Siffredus of Carpentras
  - Vergilius of Salzburg
  - November 27 (Eastern Orthodox liturgics)
- Lancashire Day (United Kingdom)
- Maaveerar Day (Tamil Eelam, Sri Lanka)
- Naval Infantry Day (Russia)
- Teacher's Day (Spain)
- International Day for the Elimination of Child, Early and Forced Marriage
