= 1985 Volvo International – Singles =

Singles
- 1985 Volvo International

Final
- Champion: (United States) John McEnroe
- Runner-up: (Czechoslovakia) Ivan Lendl
- Score: 7–6^{(7–4)}, 6–2

Details
- Draw: 64
- Seeds: 16

Events
Singles	Doubles
← 1984 ·	Volvo International	· 1986 →

Joakim Nyström was the defending champion but did not compete that year.

John McEnroe won in the final 7–6^{(7–4)}, 6–2 against Ivan Lendl.

== Seeds ==
A champion seed is indicated in bold text while text in italics indicates the round in which that seed was eliminated.

1. (United States) **John McEnroe (champion)**
2. (Czechoslovakia) Ivan Lendl (final)
3. (United States) Jimmy Connors (semifinals)
4. (United States) Johan Kriek (first round)
5. (United States) Tim Mayotte (quarterfinals)
6. (United States) Scott Davis (quarterfinals)
7. (United States) Brad Gilbert (quarterfinals)
8. (United States) David Pate (third round)
9. (United States) Greg Holmes (second round)
10. (United States) Sammy Giammalva Jr. (first round)
11. (United States) Jimmy Arias (third round)
12. (United States) Paul Annacone (quarterfinals)
13. (United States) Tim Wilkison (third round)
14. (United States) John Sadri (third round)
15. (United States) Peter Fleming (third round)
16. (United States) Mark Dickson (second round)

== Draw ==
=== Key ===
- Q = Qualifier
- WC = Wild card
- LL = Lucky loser
- Alt = Alternate
- SE = Special exempt
- PR = Protected ranking
- ITF = ITF entry
- JE = Junior exempt
- w/o = Walkover
- r = Retired
- d = Defaulted
- SR = Special ranking

=== Finals ===
Semifinals
1	(United States) **John McEnroe**	**6**	**6**
WC	(United States) Robert Seguso	2	3
3	(United States) Jimmy Connors	0	**6**	4
2	(Czechoslovakia) **Ivan Lendl**	**6**	4	**6**

Final
1	(United States) **John McEnroe**	**7**	**6**
2	(Czechoslovakia) Ivan Lendl	6	2

=== Top half ===
==== Section 1 ====
First round
1	(United States) **J McEnroe**	**6**	**6**
WC	(United States) P McEnroe	1	2
(United States) R Knapp	4	6
(United States) **B Schultz**	**6**	**7**
(United States) **D Cassidy**	**6**	3	**6**
(United States) J Brown	2	**6**	2
(South Africa) E Edwards	6	3
14	(United States) **J Sadri**	**7**	**6**
12	(United States) **P Annacone**	4	**6**	**6**
(Netherlands) H van Boeckel	**6**	4	2
(United States) S McCain	2	4
WC	(United States) **B Pearce**	**6**	**6**
(Chile) R Acuña	6	6
(United States) **M Flur**	**7**	**7**
Q	(United Kingdom) S Bale	5	**6**	2
8	(United States) **D Pate**	**7**	4	**6**

Second round
1	(United States) **J McEnroe**	**6**	**6**
(United States) B Schultz	2	1
(United States) D Cassidy	**7**	4	4
14	(United States) **J Sadri**	5	**6**	**6**
12	(United States) **P Annacone**	**6**	**6**
WC	(United States) B Pearce	2	0
(United States) M Flur	6	**6**	3
8	(United States) **D Pate**	**7**	3	**6**

Third round
1	(United States) **J McEnroe**	**6**	**7**
14	(United States) J Sadri	4	6
12	(United States) **P Annacone**	**7**	**6**
8	(United States) D Pate	6	3

Quarterfinals
1	(United States) **J McEnroe**	**6**	**6**
12	(United States) P Annacone	2	3

==== Section 2 ====
First round
4	(United States) J Kriek	6	6
WC	(United States) **R Seguso**	**7**	**7**
(Australia) **W Masur**	**6**	**6**
(United States) J Canter	3	4
Q	(United States) G Layendecker	6	2
(United Kingdom) **C Dowdeswell**	**7**	**6**
(United States) C Hooper	4	**7**	1
9	(United States) **G Holmes**	**6**	6	**6**
15	(United States) **P Fleming**	**7**	**6**
(United States) M De Palmer	6	4
(Australia) J Frawley	3	4
(United States) **Tom Gullikson**	**6**	**6**
(Canada) M Wostenholme	6	**6**	6
(United States) **B Scanlon**	**7**	4	**7**
Q	(South Africa) C van Rensburg	1	**6**	4
6	(United States) **S Davis**	**6**	2	**6**

Second round
WC	(United States) **R Seguso**	4	**7**	**7**
(Australia) W Masur	**6**	6	5
(United Kingdom) **C Dowdeswell**	**6**	**7**
9	(United States) G Holmes	4	5
15	(United States) **P Fleming**	**6**	**6**
(United States) Tom Gullikson	4	4
(United States) B Scanlon	3	3
6	(United States) **S Davis**	**6**	**6**

Third round
WC	(United States) **R Seguso**	4	**6**	**6**
(United Kingdom) C Dowdeswell	**6**	2	4
15	(United States) P Fleming	4	**6**	3
6	(United States) **S Davis**	**6**	1	**6**

Quarterfinals
WC	(United States) **R Seguso**	**6**	**7**
6	(United States) S Davis	2	6

=== Bottom half ===
==== Section 3 ====
First round
5	(United States) **T Mayotte**	**6**	**6**
(United States) K Flach	4	3
Q	(United States) T Cain	4	**7**	4
Q	(United States) **J Gurfein**	**6**	5	**6**
(United States) Tim Gullikson	6	3
(United States) **M Purcell**	**7**	**6**
(United States) **B Green**	**6**	3	**6**
10	(United States) S Giammalva Jr.	2	**6**	3
16	(United States) **M Dickson**	**6**	**6**
(United States) M Doyle	2	2
Q	(United States) G Bezecny	2	4
(United States) **B Teacher**	**6**	**6**
(Socialist Federal Republic of Yugoslavia) **S Živojinović**	**6**	**6**
(Argentina) R Saad	2	4
Q	(United States) B Blazekovic	2	2
3	(United States) **J Connors**	**6**	**6**

Second round
5	(United States) **T Mayotte**	**6**	**6**
Q	(United States) J Gurfein	4	2
(United States) M Purcell	1	4
(United States) **B Green**	**6**	**6**
16	(United States) M Dickson	3	3
(United States) **B Teacher**	**6**	**6**
(Socialist Federal Republic of Yugoslavia) S Živojinović	3	1
3	(United States) **J Connors**	**6**	**6**

Third round
5	(United States) **T Mayotte**	**6**	**6**
(United States) B Green	2	4
(United States) B Teacher	2	5
3	(United States) **J Connors**	**6**	**7**

Quarterfinals
5	(United States) T Mayotte	4	0
3	(United States) **J Connors**	**6**	**6**

==== Section 4 ====
First round
7	(United States) **B Gilbert**	**6**	**6**
(Chile) P Rebolledo	1	3
(Australia) B Drewett	5	4
(United States) **L Shiras**	**7**	**6**
Q	(United States) **M Anger**	**7**	4	**6**
(Sweden) T Högstedt	6	**6**	2
(Socialist Federal Republic of Yugoslavia) M Ostoja	**6**	3	2
WC/11	(United States) **J Arias**	4	**6**	**6**
13	(United States) **T Wilkison**	**6**	**7**
(United States) J Lapidus	2	6
LL	(United States) B Nealon	2	3
(Australia) **P Doohan**	**6**	**6**
(Australia) M Edmondson	2	4
(United States) **D Goldie**	**6**	**6**
(United States) M Bauer	1	3
2	(Czechoslovakia) **I Lendl**	**6**	**6**

Second round
7	(United States) **B Gilbert**	**6**	4	**6**
(United States) L Shiras	3	**6**	1
Q	(United States) M Anger	**6**	2	5
WC/11	(United States) **J Arias**	4	**6**	**7**
13	(United States) **T Wilkison**	4	**6**	**6**
(Australia) P Doohan	**6**	4	3
(United States) D Goldie	4	3
2	(Czechoslovakia) **I Lendl**	**6**	**6**

Third round
7	(United States) **B Gilbert**	**6**	2	**6**
WC/11	(United States) J Arias	2	**6**	3
13	(United States) T Wilkison	4	4
2	(Czechoslovakia) **I Lendl**	**6**	**6**

Quarterfinals
7	(United States) B Gilbert	3	3
2	(Czechoslovakia) **I Lendl**	**6**	**6**
