= Stratton Mountain School =

Location
- World Cup Circle; Stratton, Vermont; United States; 43°06′19″N 72°53′16″W

Information
- Established: 1972
- Founder: Warren Hellman & Donald Tarinelli
- Headmaster: Carson Thurber
- Website: www.gosms.org

The Stratton Mountain School is a college preparatory high school located at Stratton Mountain in Stratton, Vermont. The school was founded in 1972 by Warren Hellman and Donald Tarinelli. The current headmaster is Carson Thurber.

Stratton Mountain School trains winter athletes with a focus on alpine skiing (including freeski and freestyle), snowboarding, and Nordic skiing. The school has produced 46 Olympic athletes who have won six medals (3 gold, 1 silver, and 2 bronze). Ross Powers ('97) won a bronze medal (snowboarding halfpipe) at the 1998 winter games held in Nagano, Japan, and a gold medal at the 2002 games held in Salt Lake City, Utah. Powers currently serves Director of the Snowboard program.

Other Olympic medalist alumni include Lindsey Jacobellis ('03), who won a silver medal in snowboard cross in Torino, Italy in 2006 and two gold medals in Beijing in 2022, and Mac Forehand, who won a silver medal in the Men's Freeski Big Air event at the 2026 Winter Olympics in Italy. Kristin Luckenbill ('97), won a gold medal in soccer at the 2004 Summer Games in Athens, Greece.

== Tuition ==
Tuition for the 2023-2024 academic year is $65,500 for boarding students, and $51,350 for day students.

== Notable alumni ==
- Mac Forehand, American Professional Skier
- Lindsey Jacobellis, American Professional Snowboarder
- Lauren Jortberg, American Olympic Cross-Country Skier
- Kristin Luckenbill, American Professional Soccer Player
- Ross Powers, American Professional Snowboarder
