= Stratton, Vermont =

- Town
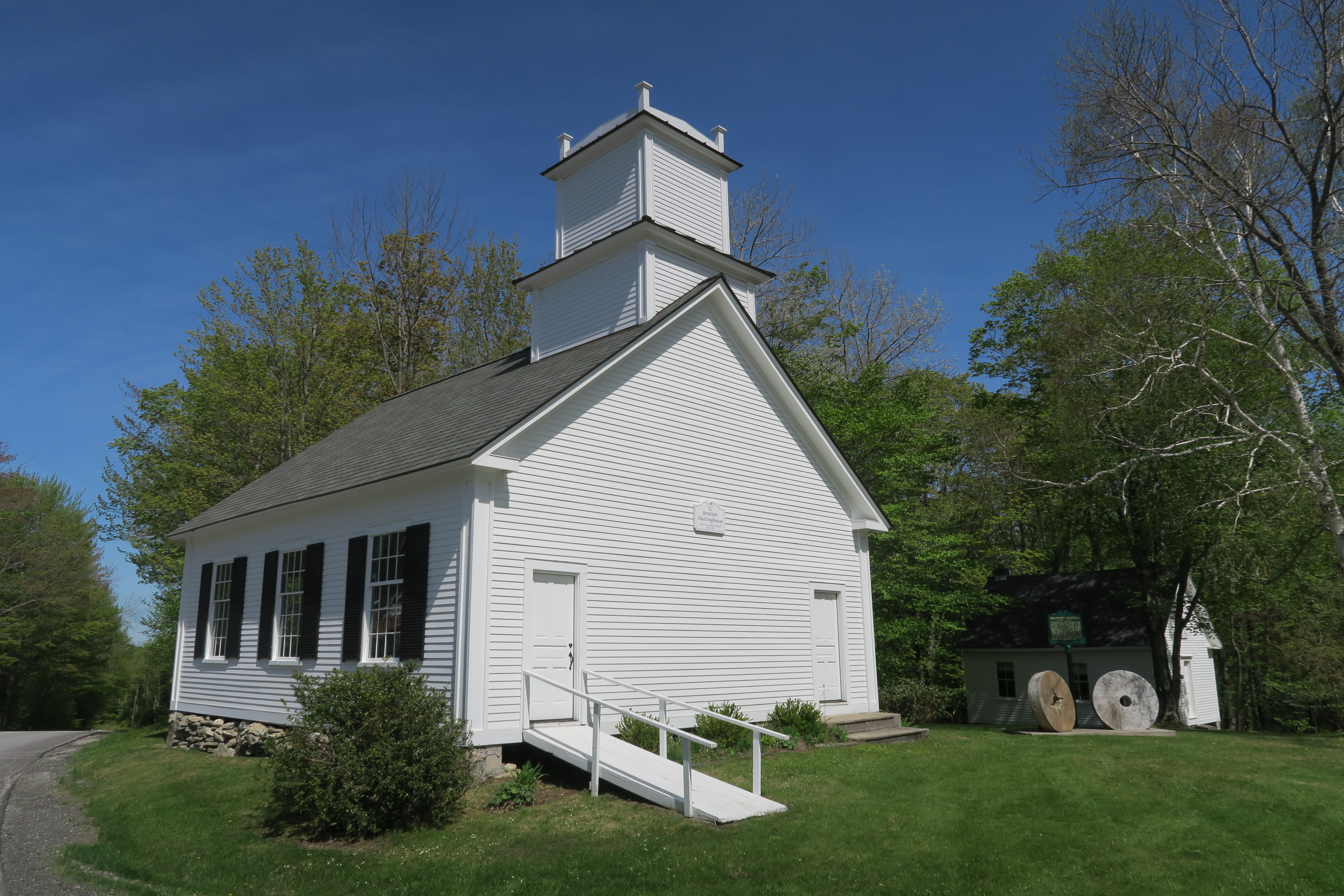
- The Stratton Meetinghouse

- Seal

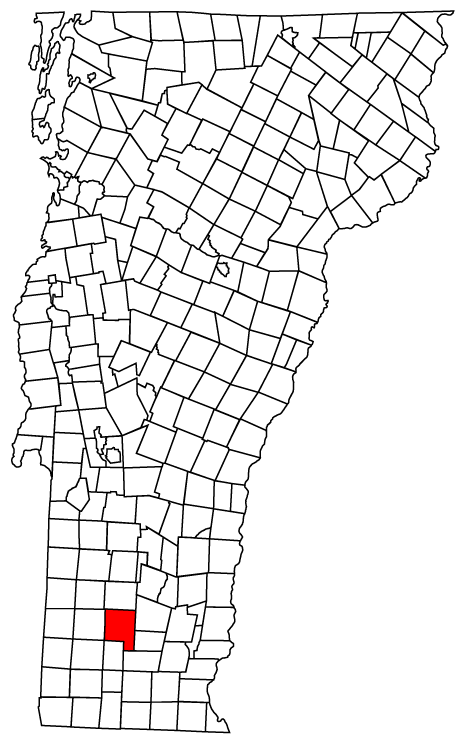
- Stratton, Vermont
- Coordinates: 43°03′30″N 72°54′50″W
- Country: United States
- State: Vermont
- County: Windham
- Communities: Stratton; Stratton Mountain (part)

Area
  - Total: 46.9 sq mi (121.5 km^{2})
  - Land: 46.4 sq mi (120.1 km^{2})
  - Water: 0.54 sq mi (1.4 km^{2})
- Elevation: 2,549 ft (777 m)

Population (2020)
  - Total: 440
  - Density: 9.6/sq mi (3.7/km^{2})
- Time zone: UTC-5 (Eastern (EST))
  - Summer (DST): UTC-4 (EDT)
- ZIP Codes: 05360 (Stratton); 05340 (Bondville); 05343 (Jamaica)
- Area code: 802
- FIPS code: 50-70750
- GNIS feature ID: 1462221
- Website: townofstrattonvt.com

Stratton is a town in Windham County, Vermont, United States. The population was 440 at the 2020 census.

== Geography ==
According to the United States Census Bureau, the town has a total area of 46.9 square miles (121.5 km^{2}), of which 46.4 square miles (120.1 km^{2}) is land and 0.5 square mile (1.4 km^{2}) (1.15%) is water. Stratton Mountain is the high point of the town. Stratton Mountain Resort is at the northern end of the mountain. The community of Stratton Mountain comprises the base of the resort as well as residential development to the north in the town of Winhall.

== History ==
Daniel Webster spoke to 10,000 Whigs on Stratton Mountain in 1840. Stratton was one of thirteen Vermont towns isolated by flooding caused by Hurricane Irene in 2011.

== Demographics ==
Historical population
| Census | Pop. | Note | %± |
|---|---|---|---|
| 1790 | 95 | | — |
| 1800 | 271 | | 185.3% |
| 1810 | 265 | | −2.2% |
| 1820 | 272 | | 2.6% |
| 1830 | 312 | | 14.7% |
| 1840 | 341 | | 9.3% |
| 1850 | 286 | | −16.1% |
| 1860 | 366 | | 28.0% |
| 1870 | 294 | | −19.7% |
| 1880 | 302 | | 2.7% |
| 1890 | 222 | | −26.5% |
| 1900 | 271 | | 22.1% |
| 1910 | 86 | | −68.3% |
| 1920 | 90 | | 4.7% |
| 1930 | 55 | | −38.9% |
| 1940 | 117 | | 112.7% |
| 1950 | 54 | | −53.8% |
| 1960 | 38 | | −29.6% |
| 1970 | 104 | | 173.7% |
| 1980 | 122 | | 17.3% |
| 1990 | 121 | | −0.8% |
| 2000 | 136 | | 12.4% |
| 2010 | 216 | | 58.8% |
| 2020 | 440 | | 103.7% |
U.S. Decennial Census

As of the census of 2000, there were 216 people, 60 households, and 36 families residing in the town. The population density was 2.9 people per square mile (1.1/km^{2}). There were 1,091 housing units at an average density of 23.5 per square mile (9.1/km^{2}). The racial makeup of the town was 98.53% White, and 1.47% from two or more races. Hispanic or Latino of any race were 2.94% of the population.

There were 60 households, out of which 26.7% had children under the age of 18 living with them, 56.7% were married couples living together, 1.7% had a female householder with no husband present, and 40.0% were non-families. 28.3% of all households were made up of individuals, and 11.7% had someone living alone who was 65 years of age or older. The average household size was 2.27 and the average family size was 2.89.

In the town, the population was spread out, with 21.3% under the age of 18, 3.7% from 18 to 24, 30.9% from 25 to 44, 26.5% from 45 to 64, and 17.6% who were 65 years of age or older. The median age was 42 years. For every 100 females, there were 106.1 males. For every 100 females age 18 and over, there were 114.0 males.

== Economy ==
=== Personal income ===
The median income for a household in the town was $39,688, and the median income for a family was $43,750. Males had a median income of $36,875 versus $28,125 for females. The per capita income for the town was $32,489. There were none of the families and 5.0% of the population living below the poverty line, including no under eighteens and none of those over 64.

== Industry ==
=== Tourism ===
Stratton Mountain Resort is a resort on Stratton Mountain. This was the first ski resort to allow snowboarding. It has 91 ski trails and snowmaking capability.

== Elections ==
Between 1988 and 2004, the town did not vote for the same national party ticket two elections in a row, unique in the state.

== Notable people ==
- Lindsey Jacobellis, Olympic snowboarder
- Ross Powers, Olympic and world champion snowboarder
- Louis Vito, Olympic snowboarder and contestant on Dancing With The Stars
- Robert Penn Warren, poet and novelist
