= 1986 Volvo International =

- Date: August 4–11
- Edition: 14th
- Category: Grand Prix
- Draw: 64S / 32D
- Prize money: $250,000
- Surface: Hard / outdoor
- Location: Stratton Mountain, Vermont, United States
- Venue: Stratton Mountain Resort

Champions

Singles
- (Czechoslovakia) Ivan Lendl

Doubles
- (United States) Peter Fleming / (United States) John McEnroe
- Volvo International

The 1986 Volvo International was a men's tennis tournament played on outdoor hard courts at the Stratton Mountain Resort in Stratton Mountain, Vermont, United States, and was part of the 1986 Nabisco Grand Prix. The tournament ran from August 4 through August 11, 1986. First-seeded Ivan Lendl won the singles title.

== Finals ==
=== Singles ===
(Czechoslovakia) Ivan Lendl defeated (West Germany) Boris Becker 6–4, 7–6

- It was Lendl's 7th singles title of the year and the 60th of his career.

=== Doubles ===
(United States) Peter Fleming / (United States) John McEnroe defeated (United States) Paul Annacone / (South Africa) Christo van Rensburg 6–3, 3–6, 6–3

- It was Fleming's 2nd title of the year and the 59th of his career. It was McEnroe's 1st title of the year and the 125th of his career.
