= 1987 Volvo International =

- Date: August 3–10
- Edition: 15th
- Draw: 64S / 32D
- Surface: Hard / outdoor
- Location: Stratton Mountain, Vermont, U.S.
- Venue: Stratton Mountain Resort

Champions

Singles
- N/A

Doubles
- N/A: Both finals were cancelled due to rain.
- Volvo International

The 1987 Volvo International was a men's tennis tournament played on outdoor hard courts at the Stratton Mountain Resort in Stratton Mountain, Vermont, United States, and was part of the 1987 Nabisco Grand Prix. It was the 15th edition of the tournament and was held from August 3 through August 10, 1987.

== Finals ==
=== Singles ===
No Winner as the final was abandoned
(Czechoslovakia) Ivan Lendl and (United States) John McEnroe both received runners-up finishes.

=== Doubles ===
(United States) Paul Annacone / (South Africa) Christo van Rensburg vs. (United States) Ken Flach / (United States) Robert Seguso

- Both the men's singles and doubles finals were cancelled due to rain.
