= 1986 Volvo International – Singles =

Singles
- 1986 Volvo International

Final
- Champion: (Czechoslovakia) Ivan Lendl
- Runner-up: (West Germany) Boris Becker
- Score: 6–4, 7–6

Details
- Draw: 64
- Seeds: 16

Events
Singles	Doubles
← 1985 ·	Volvo International	· 1987 →

John McEnroe was the defending champion but lost in the semifinals to Boris Becker.

Ivan Lendl won in the final 6–4, 7–6 against Becker.

== Seeds ==
A champion seed is indicated in bold text while text in italics indicates the round in which that seed was eliminated.

1. (Czechoslovakia) **Ivan Lendl (champion)**
2. (West Germany) Boris Becker (final)
3. (United States) Jimmy Connors (semifinals)
4. (United States) John McEnroe (semifinals)
5. (United States) Tim Mayotte (second round)
6. (Sweden) Mikael Pernfors (third round)
7. (United States) Brad Gilbert (quarterfinals)
8. (United States) Paul Annacone (second round)
9. (United States) Johan Kriek (second round)
10. (United States) Jimmy Arias (first round)
11. (United States) Matt Anger (first round)
12. (United States) Robert Seguso (quarterfinals)
13. (United States) Tim Wilkison (second round)
14. (United States) David Pate (first round)
15. (United States) Kevin Curren (third round)
16. (India) Ramesh Krishnan (second round)

== Draw ==
=== Key ===
- Q = Qualifier
- WC = Wild card
- LL = Lucky loser
- Alt = Alternate
- SE = Special exempt
- PR = Protected ranking
- ITF = ITF entry
- JE = Junior exempt
- w/o = Walkover
- r = Retired
- d = Defaulted
- SR = Special ranking

=== Finals ===
Semifinals
1	(Czechoslovakia) **Ivan Lendl**	**6**	3	**6**
3	(United States) Jimmy Connors	4	**6**	2
4	(United States) John McEnroe	**6**	5	6
WC/2	(West Germany) **Boris Becker**	3	**7**	**7**

Final
1	(Czechoslovakia) **Ivan Lendl**	**6**	**7**
WC/2	(West Germany) Boris Becker	4	6

=== Top half ===
==== Section 1 ====
First round
1	(Czechoslovakia) **I Lendl**	**6**	**7**
(Israel) A Mansdorf	2	5
(Chile) R Acuña	**7**	4	4
(South Africa) **B Moir**	6	**6**	**6**
(Czechoslovakia) **M Šrejber**	**7**	**7**
Q	(United States) J Grabb	6	6
(South Africa) D Visser	3	4
16	(India) **R Krishnan**	**6**	**6**
9	(United States) **J Kriek**	**6**	5	**6**
WC	(United States) P McEnroe	2	**7**	4
(United States) **G Holmes**	**6**	**6**
(South Africa) E Edwards	4	2
(United States) **M Freeman**	4	**6**	**6**
WC	(South Africa) C van Rensburg	**6**	0	3
(United States) S Giammalva Jr.	**6**	4	1
7	(United States) **B Gilbert**	2	**6**	**6**

Second round
1	(Czechoslovakia) **I Lendl**	**6**	**6**
(South Africa) B Moir	1	2
(Czechoslovakia) **M Šrejber**	**6**	4	**6**
16	(India) R Krishnan	2	**6**	2
9	(United States) J Kriek	1	3
(United States) **G Holmes**	**6**	**6**
(United States) M Freeman	**6**	2	0
7	(United States) **B Gilbert**	3	**6**	**6**

Third round
1	(Czechoslovakia) **I Lendl**	**6**	**6**
(Czechoslovakia) M Šrejber	3	2
(United States) G Holmes	2	**6**	2
7	(United States) **B Gilbert**	**6**	4	**6**

Quarterfinals
1	(Czechoslovakia) **I Lendl**	**6**	3	**6**
7	(United States) B Gilbert	2	**6**	2

==== Section 2 ====
First round
3	(United States) **J Connors**	6	**6**	**7**
Q	(United States) E Korita	**7**	3	5
(United States) G Layendecker	2	4
WC	(United States) **B Pearce**	**6**	**6**
(Peru) **P Arraya**	**6**	**7**
(Nigeria) N Odizor	3	5
(Canada) G Michibata	**6**	4	1
13	(United States) **T Wilkison**	4	**6**	**6**
12	(United States) **R Seguso**	**6**	**6**
(United States) T Gullikson	4	2
(United States) **M Davis**	**6**	**6**
(Sweden) J Windahl	1	2
(United States) T Nelson	**6**	3	2
Q	(United States) **G Donnelly**	2	**6**	**6**
(Peru) C di Laura	1	2
6	(Sweden) **M Pernfors**	**6**	**6**

Second round
3	(United States) **J Connors**	**6**	**6**
WC	(United States) B Pearce	4	3
(Peru) **P Arraya**	**6**	4	**6**
13	(United States) T Wilkison	4	**6**	2
12	(United States) **R Seguso**	2	**7**	**6**
(United States) M Davis	**6**	5	2
Q	(United States) G Donnelly	**6**	3	4
6	(Sweden) **M Pernfors**	3	**6**	**6**

Third round
3	(United States) **J Connors**	4	**6**	**6**
(Peru) P Arraya	**6**	4	0
12	(United States) **R Seguso**	**6**	4	**6**
6	(Sweden) M Pernfors	3	**6**	3

Quarterfinals
3	(United States) **J Connors**	3	**6**	**6**
12	(United States) R Seguso	**6**	2	1

=== Bottom half ===
==== Section 3 ====
First round
5	(United States) **T Mayotte**	3	**7**	**7**
(United States) C Hooper	**6**	5	6
(Sweden) S Eriksson	6	2
Q	(United States) **A Agassi**	**7**	**6**
(United States) V Wilder	5	**7**	6
(United States) **S Davis**	**7**	5	**7**
(Australia) **M Kratzmann**	**7**	**6**
11	(United States) M Anger	6	3
14	(United States) D Pate	**6**	1	4
(Australia) **W Masur**	1	**6**	**6**
Q	(United States) R Rudeen	1	0
Q	(United States) **M Flur**	**6**	**6**
(United States) V Van Patten	5	**6**	1
(United States) **P Fleming**	**7**	4	**6**
LL	(Socialist Federal Republic of Yugoslavia) M Ostoja	5	3
4	(United States) **J McEnroe**	**7**	**6**

Second round
5	(United States) T Mayotte	**6**	4	2
Q	(United States) **A Agassi**	4	**6**	**6**
(United States) **S Davis**	**6**	**6**
(Australia) M Kratzmann	3	4
(Australia) **W Masur**	**6**	**6**
Q	(United States) M Flur	2	1
(United States) P Fleming	1	4
4	(United States) **J McEnroe**	**6**	**6**

Third round
Q	(United States) **A Agassi**	**6**	3	**6**
(United States) S Davis	3	**6**	2
(Australia) W Masur	2	6
4	(United States) **J McEnroe**	**6**	**7**

Quarterfinals
Q	(United States) A Agassi	3	3
4	(United States) **J McEnroe**	**6**	**6**

==== Section 4 ====
First round
8	(United States) **P Annacone**	5	**6**	**6**
(Australia) M Edmondson	**7**	2	4
Q	(United States) J Ross	3	3
Q	(Canada) **M Laurendeau**	**6**	**6**
(Peru) J Yzaga	4	3
(United States) **J Canter**	**6**	**6**
(United States) **T Witsken**	**6**	3	**7**
10	(United States) J Arias	3	**6**	6
15	(United States) **K Curren**	**6**	**6**
(United States) H Solomon	3	3
(United States) B Green	2	**7**	4
(South Africa) **C Steyn**	**6**	5	**6**
(United States) M Leach	**6**	2	3
WC	(United States) **K Flach**	4	**6**	**6**
(United States) B Schultz	4	6
WC/2	(West Germany) **B Becker**	**6**	**7**

Second round
8	(United States) P Annacone	3	**6**	6
Q	(Canada) **M Laurendeau**	**6**	4	**7**
(United States) **J Canter**	**6**	**7**
(United States) T Witsken	1	6
15	(United States) **K Curren**	**6**	**7**
(South Africa) C Steyn	3	6
WC	(United States) K Flach	4	**7**	4
WC/2	(West Germany) **B Becker**	**6**	6	**6**

Third round
Q	(Canada) **M Laurendeau**	**6**	4	**6**
(United States) J Canter	4	**6**	3
15	(United States) K Curren	2	**6**	6
WC/2	(West Germany) **B Becker**	**6**	3	**7**

Quarterfinals
Q	(Canada) M Laurendeau	5	2
WC/2	(West Germany) **B Becker**	**7**	**6**
