= Blažeković =

Blažeković or Blazekovic is a Croatian surname, originating from the vicinity of Bjelovar. Notable people with this surname include:

- Bob Blazekovic (born 1960), American former tennis player
- Milan Blažeković (1940–2019), Croatian animator
- Zdenko Blažeković (1915–1947), Croatian fascist official
