= Stratton Mountain (Vermont) =

Mountain in United States of America

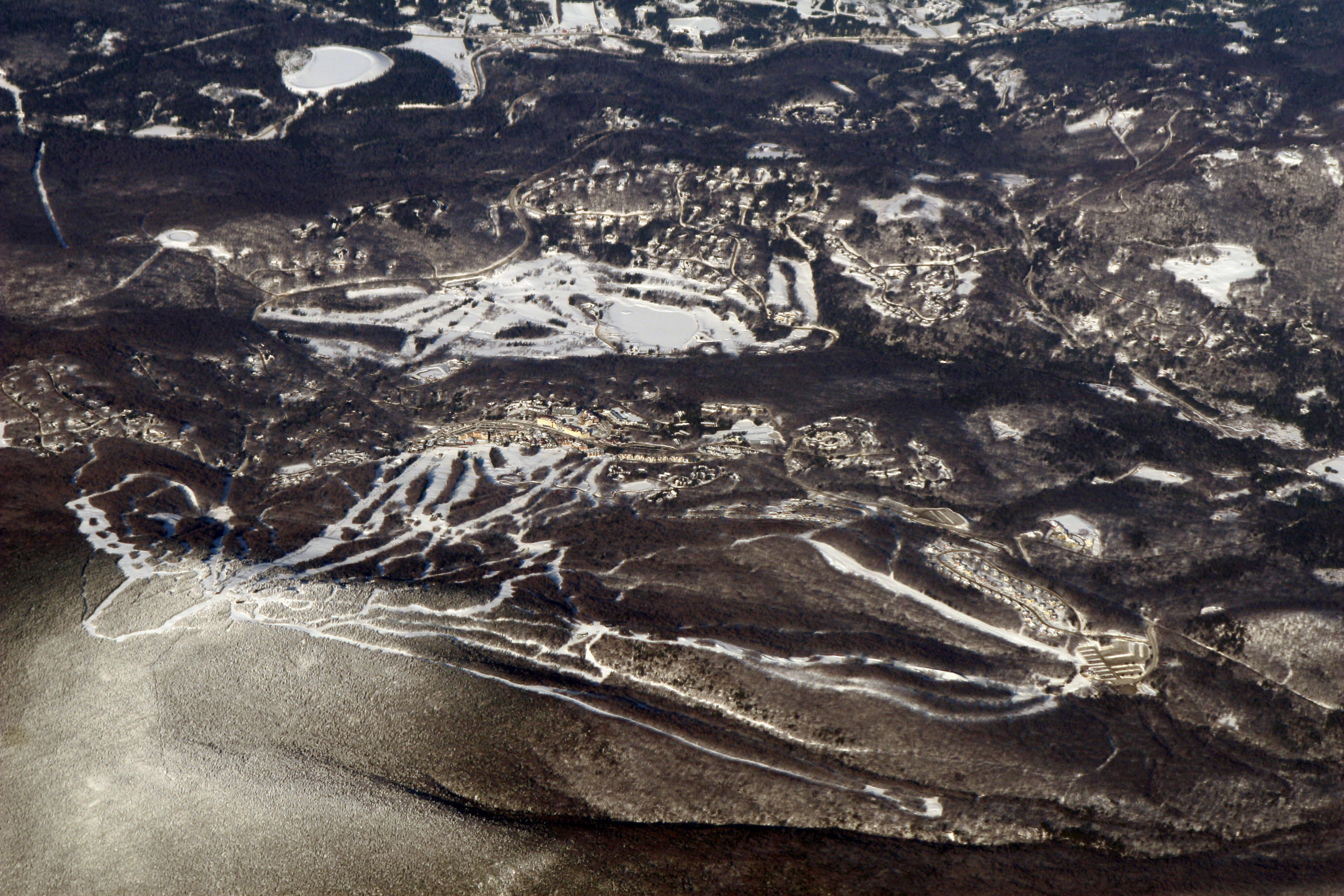
- Aerial photo of Stratton Mountain Ski Area in 2009

Highest point
- Elevation: 3,940 ft (1,200 m)
- Prominence: 2,410 ft (730 m)
- Listing: #21 New England Fifty Finest #73 New England 100 Highest
- Coordinates: 43°5.17′N 72°55.51′W

Geography
- Location: Windham County, Vermont
- Parent range: Green Mountains
- Topo map: USGS Stratton Mountain

Climbing
- Easiest route: Ski lift
- Stratton Mountain Lookout Tower
- U.S. National Register of Historic Places
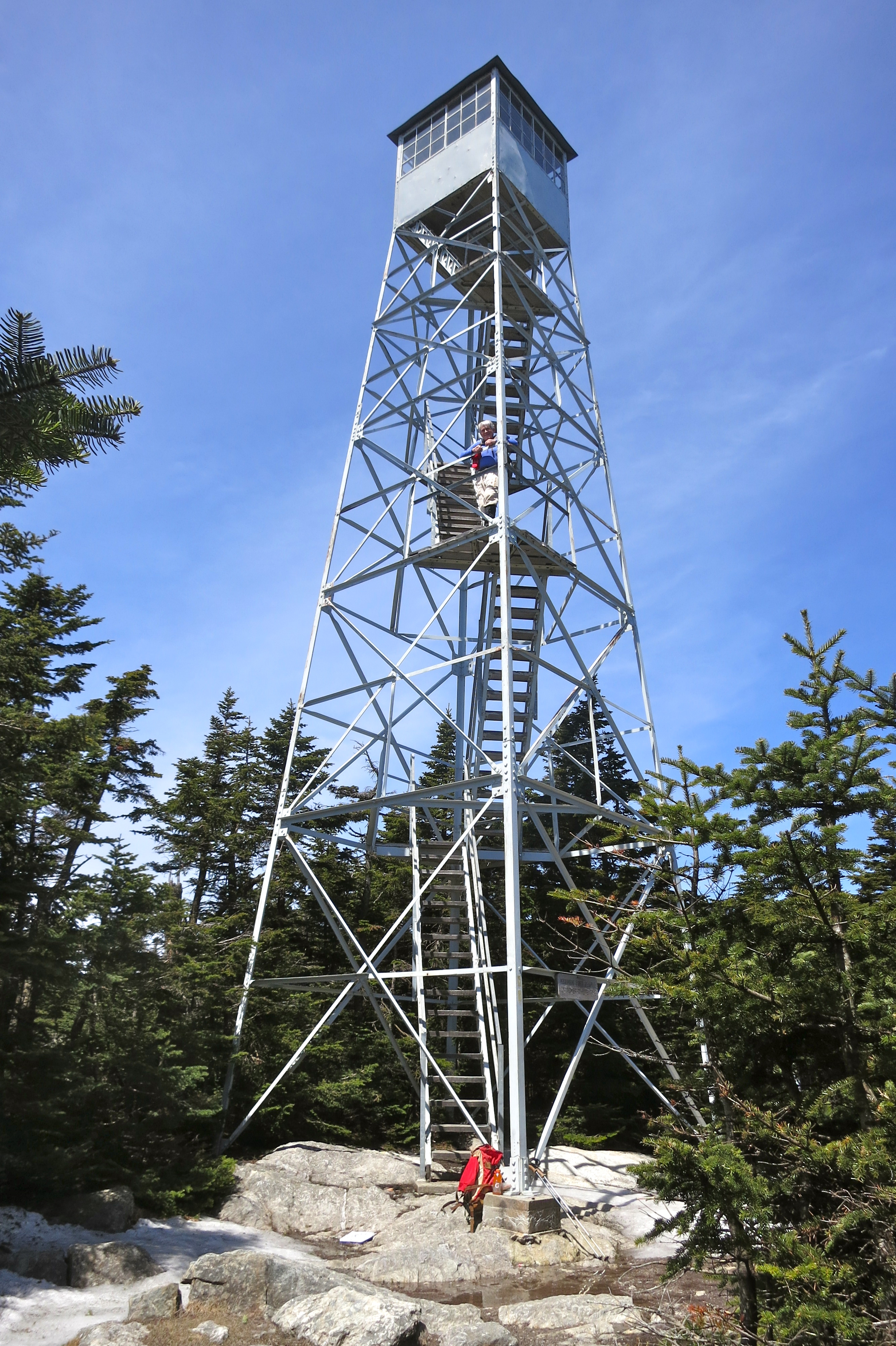
- Stratton Mountain Lookout Tower in May 2014

- Location within Vermont Location within the United States
- Area: 1 acre (0.40 ha)
- Built: c. 1934
- Built by: Civilian Conservation Corps; Leon Stocker
- NRHP reference No.: 92000687
- Added to NRHP: June 17, 1992

Stratton Mountain is a mountain located in Windham County, Vermont, in the Green Mountain National Forest. The mountain is the highest point of Windham County, and of the southern Green Mountains generally. A fire tower located on the summit is generally open for climbing by the public. There is also a small caretaker cabin (not open to the public) at the summit that is inhabited in season by a caretaker from the Green Mountain Club. The northern end of the mountain is occupied by Stratton Mountain Resort.

== Geography ==
Stratton Mountain stands within the watershed of the Connecticut River, which drains into Long Island Sound in Connecticut. The south and southeast slopes of Stratton Mountain drain into Ball Mountain Brook, thence into the West River, and into the Connecticut River. The east side of Stratton drains via Kidder Brook into the North Branch of Ball Mountain Brook. The north side of Stratton drains into the North Branch of Ball Mountain Brook. The northwest side of Stratton drains into the Winhall River, and thence into the West River. The southwest slopes of Stratton drain into the East Branch of the Deerfield River, another tributary of the Connecticut River.

The mountain has two peaks, of which the southern one is the highest, at 3940 feet. The mountain ridge descends to northward to a saddle at 3830 feet, before rising to the north peak at 3875 feet. The south summit is wooded, except for the small clearing housing the tower and caretaker's cabin. The Stratton Mountain Lookout Tower was built about 1934 by a crew of the Civilian Conservation Corps, and the cabin dates to about 1970. The tower is the subject of a 1992 listing on the National Register of Historic Places, as one of the state's last surviving towers, and one of the last three to be taken out service for fire spotting (in 1982).

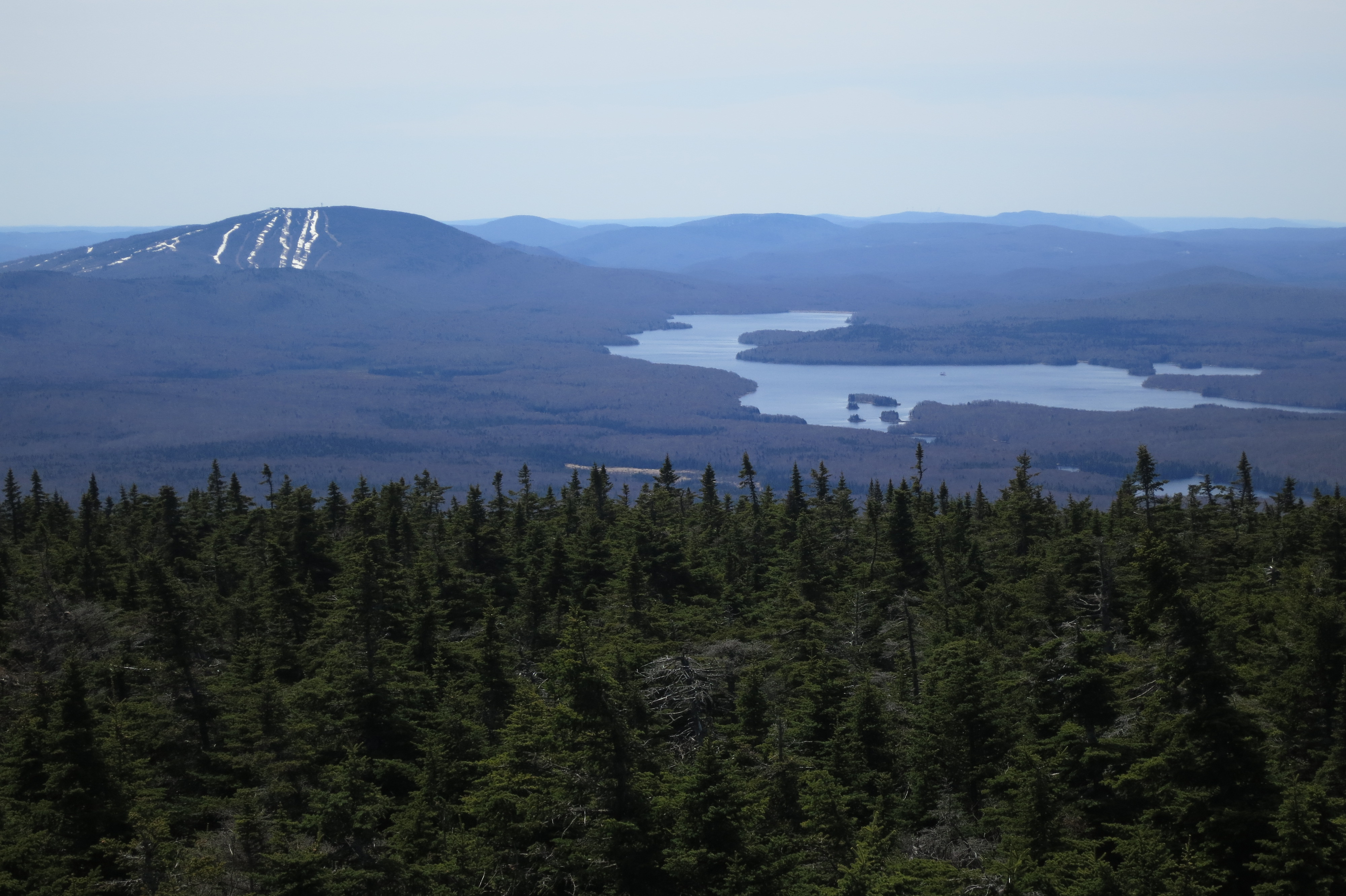
Looking south at Mt. Snow Ski Area and Somerset Reservoir from the Stratton Mountain Fire Tower - May 2014

== Climate ==
Climate data for Stratton Mountain 43.0915 N, 72.9252 W, Elevation: 3,763 ft (1,147 m) (1991–2020 normals)
Month	Jan	Feb	Mar	Apr	May	Jun	Jul	Aug	Sep	Oct	Nov	Dec	Year
Mean daily maximum °F (°C)	22.6 (−5.2)	24.9 (−3.9)	33.2 (0.7)	45.0 (7.2)	57.0 (13.9)	65.2 (18.4)	69.4 (20.8)	68.2 (20.1)	62.5 (16.9)	50.7 (10.4)	38.7 (3.7)	27.9 (−2.3)	47.1 (8.4)
Daily mean °F (°C)	14.4 (−9.8)	16.0 (−8.9)	23.9 (−4.5)	35.3 (1.8)	46.7 (8.2)	55.1 (12.8)	60.0 (15.6)	58.8 (14.9)	52.9 (11.6)	41.4 (5.2)	30.8 (−0.7)	20.9 (−6.2)	38.0 (3.3)
Mean daily minimum °F (°C)	6.2 (−14.3)	7.2 (−13.8)	14.7 (−9.6)	25.6 (−3.6)	36.5 (2.5)	45.1 (7.3)	50.5 (10.3)	49.3 (9.6)	43.3 (6.3)	32.2 (0.1)	22.9 (−5.1)	13.9 (−10.1)	29.0 (−1.7)
Average precipitation inches (mm)	5.82 (148)	4.73 (120)	5.84 (148)	5.87 (149)	6.00 (152)	7.07 (180)	5.84 (148)	6.26 (159)	5.99 (152)	7.33 (186)	5.91 (150)	6.73 (171)	73.39 (1,863)
Source: PRISM Climate Group

== Hiking history ==
Stratton Mountain claims a unique role in hiking trail history. In 1909, James P. Taylor (1872–1949) was on the mountain when he conceived the idea of a trail from Massachusetts to Canada, which became Vermont's Long Trail. While on the summit of Stratton during the construction of the Long Trail, Benton MacKaye (1879–1975) considered that it would be a good idea to have a trail spanning the entire Appalachian Range. The result was the Appalachian Trail, a 2,170-mile (3,490 km) National Scenic Trail from Georgia to Maine. In southern Vermont, the two trails are coincident, crossing the summit of Stratton from south to north. A short (.75-mile), relatively flat side trail leads from the summit to the Stratton Mountain Resort.

== Stratton Mountain Resort ==
Stratton Mountain ski resort is located on the northeast slopes of the mountain. It has 97 trails over 600 acres (2.4 km^{2}) with a 2,000-foot (610 m) vertical drop, served by 16 lifts, including four 6-person chair lifts. The community of Stratton Mountain, a census-designated place, comprises the base of the ski resort, the Stratton Golf Course, and the associated residential development.

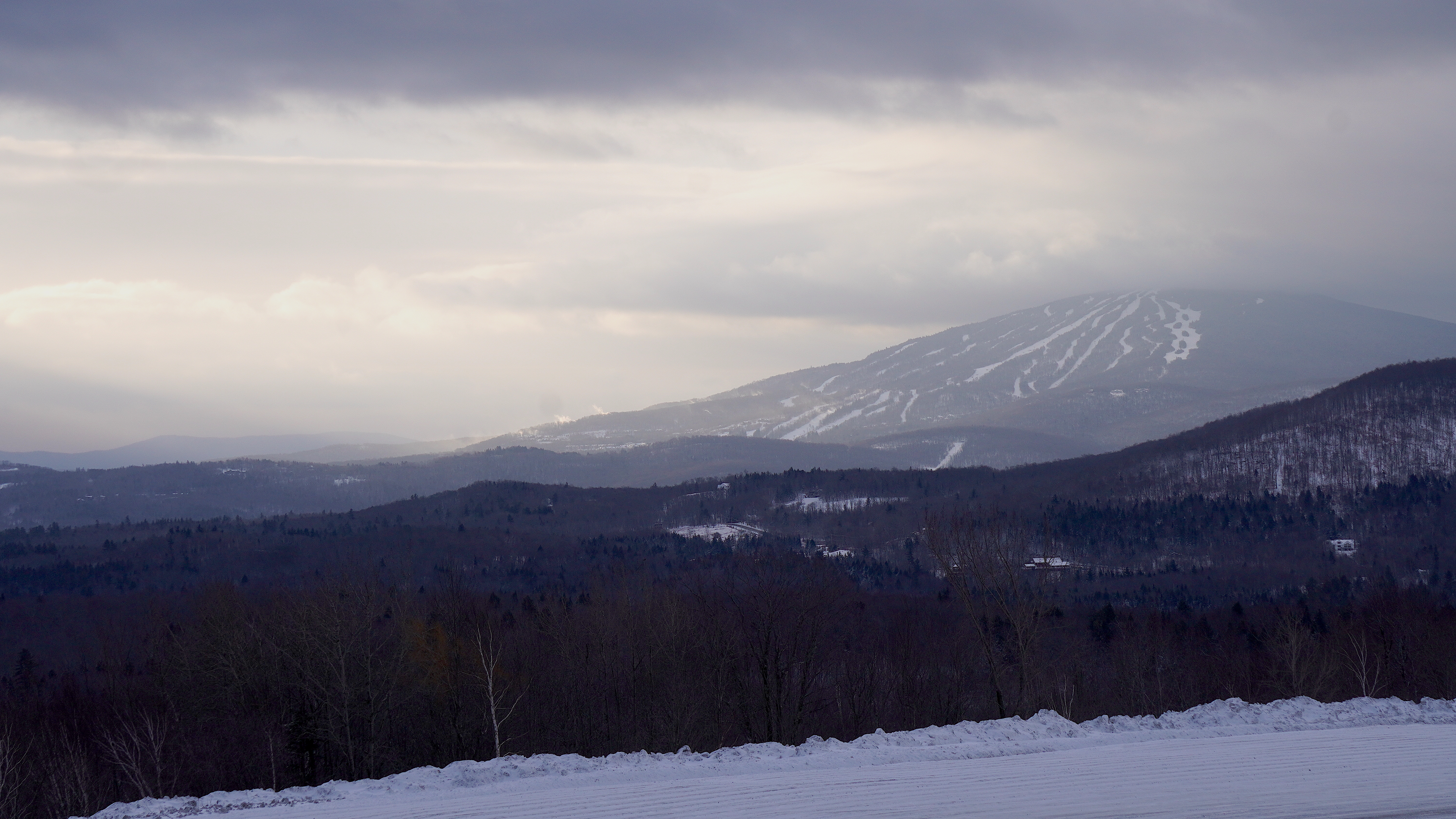
The Northeast face of Stratton Mountain in late December with ski trails visible

Stratton Mountain School was founded in 1972 by Warren Hellman and Donald Tarinelli. It is a winter sports academy and college preparatory school. It continues to run today, and has produced 46 Olympic competitors.

Jake Burton built his first snowboard while living in Manchester, near Stratton, which was the first major ski resort to allow snowboarding. Burton snowboards continued the relationship with the snowboard school and developed many programs that were vital to the snowboarding industry.

Stratton Mountain ski resort and the Stratton Mountain School have been home to some of the world's best snowboarders, including the 2002 Men's half pipe Olympic gold medalist Ross Powers, and Lindsey Jacobellis, who achieved a silver medal in the Snowboard cross event in 2006.

Stratton Mountain was home to and hosted 30th anniversary of the US OPEN Snowboarding & Freestyle Skiing Championships in March 2012. After nearly three decades of hosting this event, it moved to Vail Ski Resort in 2013.

== See also ==
- List of mountains in Vermont
- New England Hundred Highest
- New England Fifty Finest
- National Register of Historic Places listings in Windham County, Vermont
