= 1986 Volvo International – Doubles =

Doubles
- 1986 Volvo International
- 1985 Champions: (United States) Scott Davis (United States) David Pate

Final
- Champions: (United States) Peter Fleming (United States) John McEnroe
- Runners-up: (United States) Paul Annacone (South Africa) Christo van Rensburg
- Score: 6–3, 3–6, 6–3

Details
- Draw: 32
- Seeds: 8

Events
Singles	Doubles
← 1985 ·	Volvo International	· 1987 →

Scott Davis and David Pate were the defending champions but lost in the quarterfinals to Kevin Curren and Matt Mitchell.

Peter Fleming and John McEnroe won in the final 6–3, 3–6, 6–3 against Paul Annacone and Christo van Rensburg.

== Seeds ==
Champion seeds are indicated in bold text while text in italics indicates the round in which those seeds were eliminated.

1. (United States) Ken Flach / (United States) Robert Seguso (quarterfinals)
2. (United States) Scott Davis / (United States) David Pate (quarterfinals)
3. (United States) Paul Annacone / (South Africa) Christo van Rensburg (final)
4. (West Germany) Boris Becker / (United States) Tim Wilkison (quarterfinals)
5. (United States) Brad Gilbert / (United States) Vince Van Patten (semifinals)
6. (Australia) Mark Edmondson / (United States) Sherwood Stewart (first round)
7. (United States) Gary Donnelly / (United States) Johan Kriek (first round)
8. (South Africa) Christo Steyn / (South Africa) Danie Visser (second round)

== Draw ==
=== Key ===
- Q = Qualifier
- WC = Wild card
- LL = Lucky loser
- Alt = Alternate
- SE = Special exempt
- PR = Protected ranking
- ITF = ITF entry
- JE = Junior exempt
- w/o = Walkover
- r = Retired
- d = Defaulted
- SR = Special ranking

=== Final ===
Final
	(United States) **Peter Fleming** (United States) **John McEnroe**	**6**	3	**6**
3	(United States) Paul Annacone (South Africa) Christo van Rensburg	3	**6**	3

=== Top half ===
First round
1	(United States) **K Flach** (United States) **R Seguso**	3	**7**	**6**
(Mexico) J Lozano (United States) T Witsken	**6**	6	3
(United States) R Baxter (United States) J Rive	3	4
(United States) **G Layendecker** (Canada) **G Michibata**	**6**	**6**
(United States) **P Fleming** (United States) **J McEnroe**	**6**	3	**6**
(Chile) R Acuña (United States) T Gullikson	3	**6**	4
(Finland) L Palin (Sweden) J Windahl	5	**7**	3
8	(South Africa) **C Steyn** (South Africa) **D Visser**	**7**	5	**6**
4	(West Germany) **B Becker** (United States) **T Wilkison**	**7**	**6**
(Australia) M Kratzmann (Israel) A Mansdorf	6	4
(United States) T Nelson (Nigeria) N Odizor	4	3
(United States) **J Connors** (United States) **D Goldie**	**6**	**6**
(United States) **B Green** (Australia) **W Masur**	**6**	**6**
(United States) C Hooper (United States) M Leach	3	4
(United States) T Delatte (United States) C B Strode	1	2
5	(United States) **B Gilbert** (United States) **V Van Patten**	**6**	**6**

Second round
1	(United States) **K Flach** (United States) **R Seguso**	**6**	**6**
(United States) G Layendecker (Canada) G Michibata	4	2
(United States) **P Fleming** (United States) **J McEnroe**	**6**	4	**7**
8	(South Africa) C Steyn (South Africa) D Visser	4	**6**	6
4	(West Germany) **B Becker** (United States) **T Wilkison**	**6**	**6**
(United States) J Connors (United States) D Goldie	3	3
(United States) B Green (Australia) W Masur	4	6
5	(United States) **B Gilbert** (United States) **V Van Patten**	**6**	**7**

Quarterfinals
1	(United States) K Flach (United States) R Seguso	4	2
(United States) **P Fleming** (United States) **J McEnroe**	**6**	**6**
4	(West Germany) B Becker (United States) T Wilkison	**7**	4	3
5	(United States) **B Gilbert** (United States) **V Van Patten**	5	**6**	**6**

Semifinals
(United States) **P Fleming** (United States) **J McEnroe**	**6**	**6**
5	(United States) B Gilbert (United States) V Van Patten	2	3

=== Bottom half ===
First round
6	(Australia) M Edmondson (United States) S Stewart	6	**7**	3
(United States) **S Denton** (Czechoslovakia) **I Lendl**	**7**	5	**6**
(United States) S Giammalva Jr. (United States) G Holmes	2	**7**	3
(United States) **K Richter** (United States) **R Rudeen**	**6**	6	**6**
(United States) **M Anger** (United States) **J Arias**	**6**	5	**7**
(South Africa) B Moir (Finland) O Rahnasto	4	**7**	6
(United States) J Letts (United States) B Pearce	4	4
3	(United States) **P Annacone** (South Africa) **C van Rensburg**	**6**	**6**
7	(United States) G Donnelly (United States) J Kriek	**7**	3	4
(United States) **K Curren** (United States) **M Mitchell**	6	**6**	**6**
(United States) S DeVries (United States) P McEnroe	5	6
(South Africa) **G Muller** (South Africa) **M Robertson**	**7**	**7**
(Sweden) S Eriksson (Sweden) M Pernfors	6	**6**	2
(United States) **M Davis** (United States) **B Schultz**	**7**	3	**6**
(South Africa) E Edwards (Paraguay) F González	3	4
2	(United States) **S Davis** (United States) **D Pate**	**6**	**6**

Second round
(United States) **S Denton** (Czechoslovakia) **I Lendl**	**7**	**6**
(United States) K Richter (United States) R Rudeen	6	0
(United States) M Anger (United States) J Arias	2	**7**	2
3	(United States) **P Annacone** (South Africa) **C van Rensburg**	**6**	5	**6**
(United States) **K Curren** (United States) **M Mitchell**	6	**6**	**7**
(South Africa) G Muller (South Africa) M Robertson	**7**	3	6
(United States) M Davis (United States) B Schultz	3	5
2	(United States) **S Davis** (United States) **D Pate**	**6**	**7**

Quarterfinals
(United States) S Denton (Czechoslovakia) I Lendl	**7**	4	5
3	(United States) **P Annacone** (South Africa) **C van Rensburg**	6	**6**	**7**
(United States) **K Curren** (United States) **M Mitchell**	5	**6**	**7**
2	(United States) S Davis (United States) D Pate	**7**	4	6

Semifinals
3	(United States) **P Annacone** (South Africa) **C van Rensburg**	**6**	4	**7**
(United States) K Curren (United States) M Mitchell	3	**6**	6
