= Winhall River =

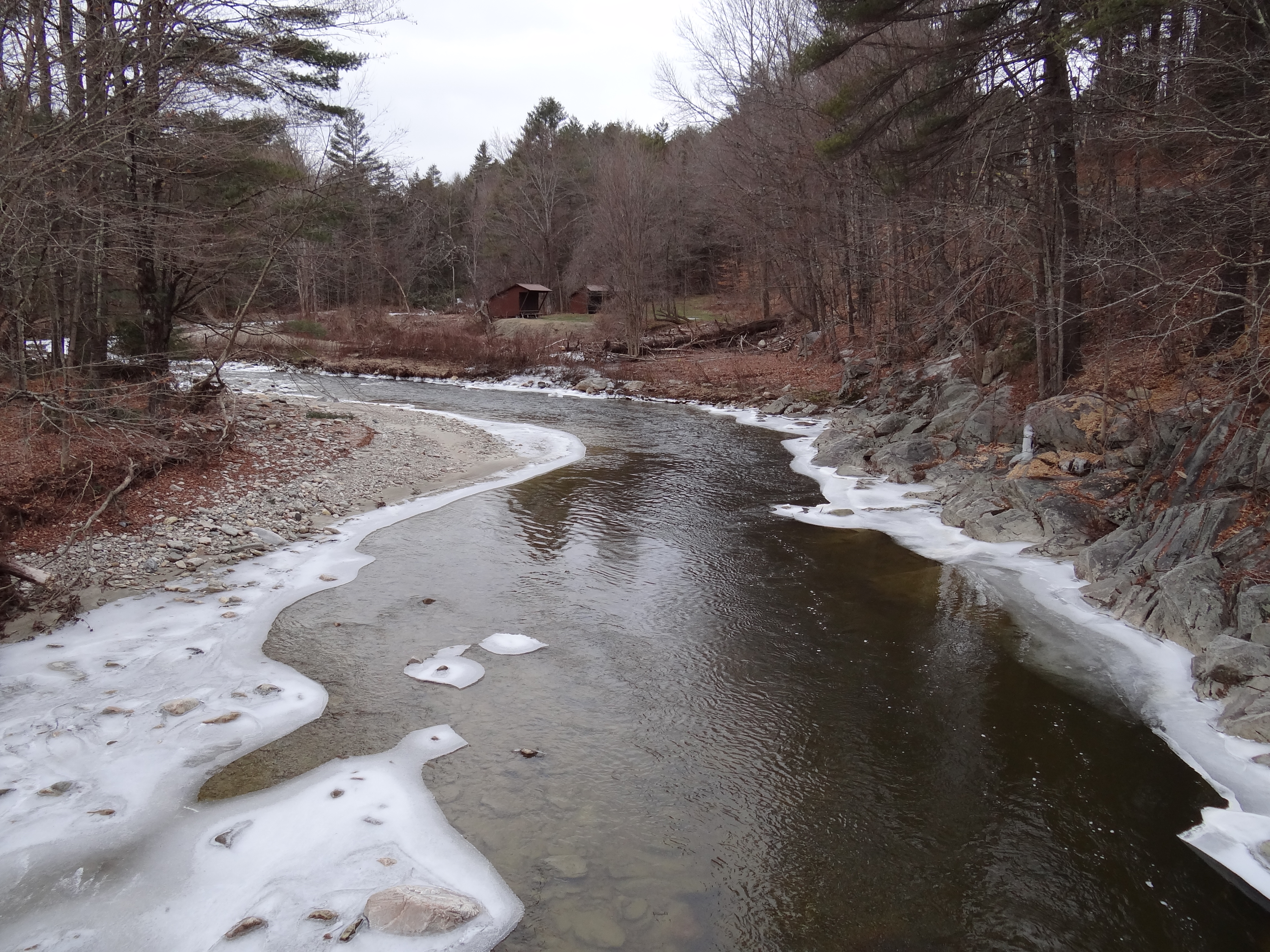
- Winhall River, West River Trail

Location
- Country: United States
- State: Vermont
- Counties: Windham, Bennington
- Towns/Cities: Stratton, Winhall, Jamaica, Londonderry

Physical characteristics
- Source
  - location: Stratton, Vermont
  - coordinates: 43.08237°N 72.99325°W
  - elevation: 788 m (2,585 ft)
- Mouth: West River
  - location: Londonderry, Vermont
  - coordinates: 43.15736°N 72.79764°W
  - elevation: 290 m (950 ft)
- Length: 29.5 km (18.3 mi)

The Winhall River is an 18.3-mile-long (29.5 km) tributary of the West River in Windham and Bennington counties, Vermont, in the United States.

The Winhall River rises near the western boundary of the town of Stratton near the crest of the Green Mountains. The river flows north, forming the eastern boundary of the Lye Brook Wilderness of the Green Mountain National Forest. It is crossed by the Appalachian Trail along this section. The river then turns east, dropping out of the high ground of the Green Mountains and passing through the town of Winhall. The river flows through the northern corner of the town of Jamaica, then enters Londonderry, where it enters the West River in Ball Mountain Reservoir.

== See also ==
- List of rivers of Vermont
