= 1987 Volvo International – Doubles =

Doubles
- 1987 Volvo International
- 1986 Champions: (United States) Peter Fleming (United States) John McEnroe

Final
- Score: No result due to rain.

Details
- Draw: 32
- Seeds: 8

Events
Singles	Doubles
← 1986 ·	Volvo International	· 1988 →

Peter Fleming and John McEnroe were the defending champions but they competed with different partners that year, Fleming with Gary Donnelly and McEnroe with his brother Patrick.

Donnelly and Fleming lost in the first round to Brad Drewett and Wally Masur, as did the McEnroes to Brad Pearce and Jim Pugh.

There was no result for the tournament due to rain. The final would have seen Paul Annacone and Christo van Rensburg take on Ken Flach and Robert Seguso.

== Seeds ==
Champion seeds are indicated in bold text while text in italics indicates the round in which those seeds were eliminated.

1. (United States) Paul Annacone / (South Africa) Christo van Rensburg (final)
2. (United States) Ken Flach / (United States) Robert Seguso (final)
3. (United States) Gary Donnelly / (United States) Peter Fleming (first round)
4. (United States) Chip Hooper / (United States) Mike Leach (second round)
5. (Australia) Peter Doohan / (Australia) Laurie Warder (semifinals)
6. (United States) Brad Gilbert / (Socialist Federal Republic of Yugoslavia) Slobodan Živojinović (first round)
7. (United States) Rick Leach / (United States) Tim Pawsat (first round)
8. (South Africa) Christo Steyn / (South Africa) Danie Visser (first round)

== Draw ==
=== Key ===
- Q = Qualifier
- WC = Wild card
- LL = Lucky loser
- Alt = Alternate
- SE = Special exempt
- PR = Protected ranking
- ITF = ITF entry
- JE = Junior exempt
- w/o = Walkover
- r = Retired
- d = Defaulted
- SR = Special ranking

=== Final ===
Final
1	(United States) Paul Annacone (South Africa) Christo van Rensburg
2	(United States) Ken Flach (United States) Robert Seguso

=== Top half ===
First round
1	(United States) **P Annacone** (South Africa) **C van Rensburg**	**6**	**6**
(United States) R Baxter (United States) J Rive	4	4
(United States) **M Freeman** (United States) **K Jones**	6	**6**	**7**
(United States) G Layendecker (France) E Winogradsky	**7**	4	6
(United States) N Caswell (United States) L Jensen	3	3
(United States) **J Letts** (Sweden) **P Lundgren**	**6**	**6**
(United States) **M Flur** (United States) **S Giammalva Jr.**	**7**	**7**
7	(United States) R Leach (United States) T Pawsat	6	5
4	(United States) **C Hooper** (United States) **M Leach**	**6**	**7**
(Australia) A Emerson (United States) J Levine	4	6
(United States) S Davis (United States) D Pate	**7**	3	5
(New Zealand) **K Evernden** (United States) **J Kriek**	6	**6**	**7**
(United States) T Siegel (United States) T Witsken	6	1
(Australia) **J Fitzgerald** (Australia) **M Kratzmann**	**7**	**6**
(Canada) G Connell (United States) D Livingston	1	5
5	(Australia) **P Doohan** (Australia) **L Warder**	**6**	**7**

Second round
1	(United States) **P Annacone** (South Africa) **C van Rensburg**	**7**	6	**6**
(United States) M Freeman (United States) K Jones	5	**7**	2
(United States) J Letts (Sweden) P Lundgren	3	**6**	5
(United States) **M Flur** (United States) **S Giammalva Jr.**	**6**	2	**7**
4	(United States) C Hooper (United States) M Leach	4	4
(New Zealand) **K Evernden** (United States) **J Kriek**	**6**	**6**
(Australia) J Fitzgerald (Australia) M Kratzmann	3	4
5	(Australia) **P Doohan** (Australia) **L Warder**	**6**	**6**

Quarterfinals
1	(United States) **P Annacone** (South Africa) **C van Rensburg**	**6**	**7**
(United States) M Flur (United States) S Giammalva Jr.	2	6
(New Zealand) K Evernden (United States) J Kriek	6	**7**	6
5	(Australia) **P Doohan** (Australia) **L Warder**	**7**	5	**7**

Semifinals
1	(United States) **P Annacone** (South Africa) **C van Rensburg**	4	**7**	**6**
5	(Australia) P Doohan (Australia) L Warder	**6**	6	4

=== Bottom half ===
First round
6	(United States) B Gilbert (Socialist Federal Republic of Yugoslavia) S Živojinović	4	**6**	6
(Nigeria) **N Odizor** (United States) **B Testerman**	**6**	3	**7**
(South Africa) **A Burrow** (United States) **R Reneberg**	**6**	**7**
(Israel) A Mansdorf (United States) B Scanlon	4	6
(India) **V Amritraj** (United States) **S Denton**	**6**	**6**
(United States) G Holmes (United States) H Pfister	4	2
(Australia) **B Drewett** (Australia) **W Masur**	6	**6**	**6**
3	(United States) G Donnelly (United States) P Fleming	**7**	2	3
8	(South Africa) C Steyn (South Africa) D Visser	2	2
(South Africa) **E Edwards** (Paraguay) **F González**	**6**	**6**
(United States) D Goldie (United States) L Scott	6	**7**	3
(Australia) **D Macpherson** (Australia) **S Youl**	**7**	6	**6**
(United States) J McEnroe (United States) P McEnroe	6	**6**	5
(United States) **B Pearce** (United States) **J Pugh**	**7**	4	**7**
(United States) A Agassi (United States) M Purcell	**6**	3	2
2	(United States) **K Flach** (United States) **R Seguso**	4	**6**	**6**

Second round
(Nigeria) **N Odizor** (United States) **B Testerman**	**7**	**6**
(South Africa) A Burrow (United States) R Reneberg	5	4
(India) V Amritraj (United States) S Denton	6	**7**	0
(Australia) **B Drewett** (Australia) **W Masur**	**7**	6	**6**
(South Africa) **E Edwards** (Paraguay) **F González**	**7**	**6**
(Australia) D Macpherson (Australia) S Youl	6	3
(United States) B Pearce (United States) J Pugh	3	3
2	(United States) **K Flach** (United States) **R Seguso**	**6**	**6**

Quarterfinals
(Nigeria) N Odizor (United States) B Testerman	6	3
(Australia) **B Drewett** (Australia) **W Masur**	**7**	**6**
(South Africa) E Edwards (Paraguay) F González	2	4
2	(United States) **K Flach** (United States) **R Seguso**	**6**	**6**

Semifinals
(Australia) B Drewett (Australia) W Masur	5	6
2	(United States) **K Flach** (United States) **R Seguso**	**7**	**7**
