= 1985 Volvo International =

- Date: August 5–12
- Edition: 13th
- Category: Grand Prix
- Draw: 64S / 32D
- Prize money: $250,000
- Surface: Hard / outdoor
- Location: Stratton Mountain, Vermont, United States
- Venue: Stratton Mountain Resort

Champions

Singles
- (United States) John McEnroe

Doubles
- (United States) Scott Davis / (United States) David Pate
- Volvo International

The 1985 Volvo International was a men's tennis tournament played on outdoor hard courts at the Stratton Mountain Resort in Stratton Mountain, Vermont, United States. It was part of the 1985 Nabisco Grand Prix. It was the 13th edition of the tournament and was held from August 5 through August 12, 1985. First-seeded John McEnroe won the singles title and earned $40,000 first-prize money.

== Finals ==
=== Singles ===
(United States) John McEnroe defeated (Czechoslovakia) Ivan Lendl 7–6^{(7–4)}, 6–2

- It was McEnroe's 6th singles title of the year and the 65th of his career.

=== Doubles ===
(United States) Scott Davis / (United States) David Pate defeated (United States) Ken Flach / (United States) Robert Seguso 3–6, 7–6, 7–6

- It was Davis' 3rd title of the year and the 6th of his career. It was Pate's 2nd title of the year and the 3rd of his career.

== See also ==
- Lendl–McEnroe rivalry
