= 1985 Volvo International – Doubles =

Doubles
- 1985 Volvo International
- 1984 Champions: (United States) Brian Gottfried (Czechoslovakia) Tomáš Šmíd

Final
- Champions: (United States) Scott Davis (United States) David Pate
- Runners-up: (United States) Ken Flach (United States) Robert Seguso
- Score: 3–6, 7–6, 7–6

Details
- Draw: 32
- Seeds: 8

Events
Singles	Doubles
← 1984 ·	Volvo International	· 1986 →

Brian Gottfried and Tomáš Šmíd were the defending champions but did not compete that year.

Scott Davis and David Pate won in the final 3–6, 7–6, 7–6 against Ken Flach and Robert Seguso.

== Seeds ==
Champion seeds are indicated in bold text while text in italics indicates the round in which those seeds were eliminated.

1. (United States) Ken Flach / (United States) Robert Seguso (final)
2. (Australia) Mark Edmondson / (Australia) Kim Warwick (first round)
3. (Australia) John Fitzgerald / (Australia) Wally Masur (semifinals)
4. (United States) Paul Annacone / (South Africa) Christo van Rensburg (semifinals)
5. (Paraguay) Francisco González / (Paraguay) Víctor Pecci (second round)
6. (Chile) Ricardo Acuña / (United States) Peter Fleming (first round)
7. (United States) Mike De Palmer / (United States) Gary Donnelly (quarterfinals)
8. (Australia) Brad Drewett / (Socialist Federal Republic of Yugoslavia) Slobodan Živojinović (first round)

== Draw ==
=== Key ===
- Q = Qualifier
- WC = Wild card
- LL = Lucky loser
- Alt = Alternate
- SE = Special exempt
- PR = Protected ranking
- ITF = ITF entry
- JE = Junior exempt
- w/o = Walkover
- r = Retired
- d = Defaulted
- SR = Special ranking

=== Final ===
Final
1	(United States) Ken Flach (United States) Robert Seguso	**6**	6	6
	(United States) **Scott Davis** (United States) **David Pate**	3	**7**	**7**

=== Top half ===
First round
1	(United States) **K Flach** (United States) **R Seguso**	**6**	**7**
(United States) J Kriek (United States) J Sadri	2	6
(United States) J Levine (United States) R Rudeen	6	6
(United States) **D Goldie** (United States) **J Ross**	**7**	**7**
(New Zealand) **R Simpson** (United States) **B Teacher**	**7**	**6**
(United States) C B Strode (United States) C Wittus	6	3
(United States) S Giammalva Jr. (United States) G Holmes	4	**6**	5
7	(United States) **M De Palmer** (United States) **G Donnelly**	**6**	2	**7**
3	(Australia) **J Fitzgerald** (Australia) **W Masur**	**7**	**6**
(United States) R Knapp (United States) E Van't Hof	5	3
(United States) P McEnroe (United States) B Pearce	4	**6**	1
(United States) **Tim Gullikson** (United States) **Tom Gullikson**	**6**	3	**6**
(United States) M Flur (United States) G Layendecker	6	2
(United States) **J Gurfein** (Nigeria) **T Mmoh**	**7**	**6**
(United States) **M Bauer** (Australia) **P Doohan**	**6**	**7**
6	(Chile) R Acuña (United States) P Fleming	4	6

Second round
1	(United States) **K Flach** (United States) **R Seguso**	**6**	**7**
(United States) D Goldie (United States) J Ross	4	6
(New Zealand) R Simpson (United States) B Teacher	**6**	6	6
7	(United States) **M De Palmer** (United States) **G Donnelly**	4	**7**	**7**
3	(Australia) **J Fitzgerald** (Australia) **W Masur**	**7**	**6**
(United States) Tim Gullikson (United States) Tom Gullikson	5	3
(United States) J Gurfein (Nigeria) T Mmoh	**6**	3	1
(United States) **M Bauer** (Australia) **P Doohan**	3	**6**	**6**

Quarterfinals
1	(United States) **K Flach** (United States) **R Seguso**	**6**	6	**6**
7	(United States) M De Palmer (United States) G Donnelly	4	**7**	4
3	(Australia) **J Fitzgerald** (Australia) **W Masur**	**7**	**7**
(United States) M Bauer (Australia) P Doohan	6	6

Semifinals
1	(United States) **K Flach** (United States) **R Seguso**	**7**	5	**7**
3	(Australia) J Fitzgerald (Australia) W Masur	5	**7**	6

=== Bottom half ===
First round
8	(Australia) B Drewett (Socialist Federal Republic of Yugoslavia) S Živojinović	4	**7**	3
(United States) **M Dickson** (United States) **T Wilkison**	**6**	6	**6**
(United States) **J Arias** (United Kingdom) **C Dowdeswell**	3	**6**	**7**
(United States) B Green (United States) B Schultz	**6**	3	6
(United States) **T Delatte** (United States) **M Purcell**	**6**	**7**
(Australia) D Graham (United States) S McCain	3	6
(United States) J Grabb (South Africa) C Honey	6	5
4	(United States) **P Annacone** (South Africa) **C van Rensburg**	**7**	**7**
5	(Paraguay) **F González** (Paraguay) **V Pecci**	**7**	1	**6**
(United States) C Hooper (United States) L Shiras	6	**6**	2
(United States) J Canter (Australia) J Frawley	4	4
(United States) **S Davis** (United States) **D Pate**	**6**	**6**
(South Africa) **E Edwards** (South Africa) **D Visser**	**6**	**6**
(United States) D Cassidy (United States) J Lapidus	4	4
(United States) **B Gilbert** (Czechoslovakia) **I Lendl**	**6**	**6**
2	(Australia) M Edmondson (Australia) K Warwick	4	3

Second round
(United States) **M Dickson** (United States) **T Wilkison**	**6**	**6**
(United States) J Arias (United Kingdom) C Dowdeswell	3	2
(United States) T Delatte (United States) M Purcell	2	2
4	(United States) **P Annacone** (South Africa) **C van Rensburg**	**6**	**6**
5	(Paraguay) F González (Paraguay) V Pecci	4	4
(United States) **S Davis** (United States) **D Pate**	**6**	**6**
(South Africa) E Edwards (South Africa) D Visser	**6**	6	4
(United States) **B Gilbert** (Czechoslovakia) **I Lendl**	3	**7**	**6**

Quarterfinals
(United States) M Dickson (United States) T Wilkison	6	4
4	(United States) **P Annacone** (South Africa) **C van Rensburg**	**7**	**6**
(United States) **S Davis** (United States) **D Pate**	**7**	**7**
(United States) B Gilbert (Czechoslovakia) I Lendl	6	6

Semifinals
4	(United States) P Annacone (South Africa) C van Rensburg	4	**6**	6
(United States) **S Davis** (United States) **D Pate**	**6**	3	**7**
