= 1987 Volvo International – Singles =

Singles
- 1987 Volvo International

Final
- Champion: No Winner
- Runner-up: (Czechoslovakia) Ivan Lendl & (United States) John McEnroe
- Score: No result due to rain.

Details
- Draw: 64
- Seeds: 16

Events
| Singles | Doubles |
- Volvo International

Ivan Lendl was the defending champion and was one of the finalists along with John McEnroe.

There was no result for the tournament due to rain.

== Seeds ==
A champion seed is indicated in bold text while text in italics indicates the round in which that seed was eliminated.

1. (Czechoslovakia) Ivan Lendl (**Final**)
2. (United States) Jimmy Connors (first round)
3. (Australia) Pat Cash (second round)
4. (United States) John McEnroe (**Final**)
5. (United States) Tim Mayotte (second round)
6. (United States) Brad Gilbert (quarterfinals)
7. (United States) David Pate (third round)
8. (United States) Scott Davis (third round)
9. (United States) Johan Kriek (second round)
10. (Australia) Wally Masur (first round)
11. (Socialist Federal Republic of Yugoslavia) Slobodan Živojinović (third round)
12. (Israel) Amos Mansdorf (third round)
13. (United States) Paul Annacone (second round)
14. (Australia) Peter Doohan (second round)
15. (South Africa) Christo van Rensburg (semifinals)
16. (United States) Derrick Rostagno (first round)

== Draw ==
Key

- Q = Qualifier
- WC = Wild card
- LL = Lucky loser
- Alt = Alternate
- ITF = ITF entry
- PR = Protected ranking
- SR = Special ranking
- SE = Special exempt
- JE = Junior exempt
- JR = Junior Accelerator Programme entrant
- CO = College Accelerator Programme entrant
- NG = Next Gen Accelerator Program entrant
- w/o = Walkover
- r = Retired
- d = Defaulted

=== Finals ===
Semifinals
1 | (Czechoslovakia) **Ivan Lendl** | **6** | 5 | **6**
(United States) Andre Agassi | 2 | **7** | 3
4 | (United States) **John McEnroe** | **6** | **6**
15 | (South Africa) Christo van Rensburg | 4 | 2

Final
1 | (Czechoslovakia) Ivan Lendl | 6 | 4 *
4 | (United States) John McEnroe | **7** | 1

- * Final unfinished due to weather. Ivan Lendl and John McEnroe both received Runners-up finishes .

=== Top half ===
==== Section 1 ====
First round
1 | (Czechoslovakia) **I Lendl** | **6** | **6**
WC | (United States) M Flur | 4 | 3
(United States) **J Pugh** | **7** | 4 | **6**
Q | (United States) P Johnson | 6 | **6** | 3
(Mexico) **F Maciel** | **6** | **6**
Q | (United States) P Palandjian | 4 | 2
(United States) **R Seguso** | **6** | **6**
16 | (United States) D Rostagno | 4 | 4
9 | (United States) **J Kriek** | **7** | **6**
(Canada) S Bonneau | 6 | 2
(United States) M Leach | 2 | 2
(United States) **K Jones** | **6** | **6**
Q | (Australia) **S Youl** | **6** | 6 | **6**
WC | (United States) R Reneberg | 4 | **7** | 1
Q | (United States) D Goldberg | **6** | 2 | 4
8 | (United States) **S Davis** | 4 | **6** | **6**

Second round
1 | (Czechoslovakia) **I Lendl** | **7** | **6**
(United States) J Pugh | 6 | 3
(Mexico) F Maciel | 3 | 4
(United States) **R Seguso** | **6** | **6**
9 | (United States) J Kriek | 2 | **6** | 1
(United States) **K Jones** | **6** | 4 | **6**
Q | (Australia) S Youl | 6 | 1
8 | (United States) **S Davis** | **7** | **6**

Third round
1 | (Czechoslovakia) **I Lendl** | **6** | 6 | **6**
(United States) R Seguso | 3 | **7** | 2
(United States) **K Jones** | **7** | **7**
8 | (United States) S Davis | 6 | 6

Quarterfinals
1 | (Czechoslovakia) **I Lendl** | **6** | **6**
(United States) K Jones | 3 | 1

==== Section 2 ====
First round
3 | (Australia) **P Cash** | 6 | **6** | **6**
(New Zealand) K Evernden | **7** | 2 | 4
(United States) **A Agassi** | 3 | **6** | **6**
Q | (United States) L Jensen | **6** | 3 | 3
(United States) **C Hooper** | **6** | **7**
(Australia) B Drewett | 4 | 5
(United States) G Donnelly | 2 | 5
13 | (United States) **P Annacone** | **6** | **7**
11 | (Socialist Federal Republic of Yugoslavia) **S Živojinović** | **6** | **6**
(South Africa) E Edwards | 4 | 1
(Sweden) J Carlsson | **6** | 4 | 5
WC | (India) **V Amritraj** | 0 | **6** | **7**
(United States) M Purcell | 6 | 3
Q | (United States) **J Rive** | **7** | **6**
(United States) T Witsken | 2 | **6** | 3
5 | (United States) **T Mayotte** | **6** | 3 | **6**

Second round
3 | (Australia) P Cash | 6 | 6
(United States) **A Agassi** | **7** | **7**
(United States) **C Hooper** | **7** | **6**
13 | (United States) P Annacone | 6 | 2
11 | (Socialist Federal Republic of Yugoslavia) **S Živojinović** | **6** | **7**
WC | (India) V Amritraj | 4 | 6
Q | (United States) **J Rive** | **7** | 2 | **6**
5 | (United States) T Mayotte | 6 | **6** | 4

Third round
(United States) **A Agassi** | **6** | 6 | **6**
(United States) C Hooper | 4 | **7** | 2
11 | (Socialist Federal Republic of Yugoslavia) S Živojinović | 6 | 2
Q | (United States) **J Rive** | **7** | **6**

Quarterfinals
(United States) **A Agassi** | **7** | **6**
Q | (United States) J Rive | 6 | 2

=== Bottom half ===
==== Section 3 ====
First round
6 | (United States) **B Gilbert** | **6** | **6**
WC | (United States) L Scott | 4 | 0
(United States) M Kures | **6** | 1 | 2
Q | (United States) **S Cannon** | 3 | **6** | **6**
(Canada) **M Laurendeau** | **7** | **6**
Q | (South Africa) A Burrow | 6 | 2
(West Germany) M Westphal | 1 | 4
12 | (Israel) **A Mansdorf** | **6** | **6**
14 | (Australia) **P Doohan** | **7** | **6**
(United States) B Scanlon | 5 | 0
(Australia) J Fitzgerald | **6** | 4 | 6
(United States) **B Testerman** | 2 | **6** | **7**
(South Africa) C Steyn | 2 | 2
(Sweden) **P Lundgren** | **6** | **6**
(United States) J Canter | 3 | 2
4 | (United States) **J McEnroe** | **6** | **6**

Second round
6 | (United States) **B Gilbert** | **6** | 6 | **6**
Q | (United States) S Cannon | 2 | **7** | 2
(Canada) M Laurendeau | 4 | 6
12 | (Israel) **A Mansdorf** | **6** | **7**
14 | (Australia) P Doohan | 2 | 5
(United States) **B Testerman** | **6** | **7**
(Sweden) P Lundgren | 3 | 4
4 | (United States) **J McEnroe** | **6** | **6**

Third round
6 | (United States) **B Gilbert** | **6** | **6**
12 | (Israel) A Mansdorf | 4 | 4
(United States) B Testerman | 6 | **6** | 1
4 | (United States) **J McEnroe** | **7** | 0 | **6**

Quarterfinals
6 | (United States) B Gilbert | 3 | 2
4 | (United States) **J McEnroe** | **6** | **6**

==== Section 4 ====
First round
7 | (United States) **D Pate** | **7** | **7**
WC | (United States) P McEnroe | 6 | 5
(United States) R Matuszewski | 3 | **6** | 6
(United States) **D Goldie** | **6** | 2 | **7**
(France) E Winogradsky | 5 | 6
(South Africa) **D Visser** | **7** | **7**
(Australia) **M Kratzmann** | 1 | **7** | **7**
10 | (Australia) W Masur | **6** | 5 | 6
15 | (South Africa) **C van Rensburg** | **6** | **6**
(Nigeria) N Odizor | 4 | 3
(United States) **S Giammalva Jr.** | **6** | **7**
(United States) P Fleming | 3 | 6
(South Africa) B Moir | 1 | 2
(United States) **M Freeman** | **6** | **6**
(United States) **G Holmes** | **7** | **7**
2 | (United States) J Connors | 5 | 5

Second round
7 | (United States) **D Pate** | **6** | **7**
(United States) D Goldie | 3 | 5
(South Africa) **D Visser** | **7** | **6**
(Australia) M Kratzmann | 6 | 3
15 | (South Africa) **C van Rensburg** | **7** | **6**
(United States) S Giammalva Jr. | 6 | 4
(United States) M Freeman | **7** | 4 | 4
(United States) **G Holmes** | 6 | **6** | **6**

Third round
7 | (United States) D Pate | 6 | **6** | 1
(South Africa) **D Visser** | **7** | 3 | **6**
15 | (South Africa) **C van Rensburg** | **6** | **6**
(United States) G Holmes | 1 | 4

Quarterfinals
(South Africa) D Visser | 2 | 3
15 | (South Africa) **C van Rensburg** | **6** | **6**
