= Jack Wishna =

American businessman

- Born: May 5, 1958; New York City, U.S.
- Died: November 27, 2012 (aged 54); Henderson, Nevada, U.S.
- Occupations: President and CEO of CPAmerica
- Known for: Rockrena, Inc.; Rock City Club; Trump International Hotel and Tower

Jack Wishna (May 5, 1958 – November 27, 2012) was an American businessman and photographer. He was the president and CEO of CPAmerica, a consulting firm for gambling, hotel, and leisure organizations, based in Las Vegas, Nevada. He was also a founder of Rockrena Inc., which launched Rock City Club, a social music network.

Wishna had been called "a wheeler and dealer in the gaming industry". Wishna "put together a deal potentially worth $250 million for Wayne Newton" at the Stardust Resort & Casino, and had worked with celebrities such as Michael Flatley, Britney Spears, Richard Branson and Mohamed al-Fayed on projects in Las Vegas. He had also partnered with Tony Orlando. He was credited with bringing Donald Trump to Las Vegas by facilitating the partnership between Trump and Phil Ruffin. Wishna helped convince Michael Jackson to return to America after 18 months in exile, and worked with him for seven months in an effort to create his comeback. According to Norm Clarke, Wishna "was instrumental in having the pop icon move back to the United States." Wishna was Jackson's friend and worked on several projects with him, including Wishna's Rock City Club project and presenting Cirque du Soleil with the idea to do a Michael Jackson show based upon the Thriller song and Jackson's many #1 hits.

Wishna founded Rockrena, Inc. and the Rock City Club brand with music promoter Don Kirshner. In 2012, Rock City Club partnered with Slacker online music service to create what it described as the world's first internet music channel devoted exclusively to giving undiscovered artists and bands the chance to have their music heard by millions of potential fans. Some of the biggest music producers in the world, with 162 Grammy Awards to their names, participate in Rock City Club. The channel is headed by Ron Dante and includes the production expertise of people like Phil Ramone, Kerry Gordy (son of Motown legend Berry Gordy), and Lamont Dozier.

== Career ==
Wishna grew up in New York City and launched his first entrepreneurial venture at 8 years of age, going door-to-door in his neighborhood, fixing broken televisions and radios for five dollars.

At the age of 13, Wishna taught himself photography to land a position as photographer at Brooklyn Today newspaper. When Wishna was only 17, a chance meeting with Steve Rubell led to Wishna becoming the photographer at Studio 54 when Steve Rubell and Ian Schrager opened the nightclub in New York City. Wishna photographed Andy Warhol, Halston, Liza Minnelli, Burt Reynolds and Bianca Jagger.

By the age of 19, Wishna opened his own commercial and celebrity photography studio in NYC, where he photographed celebrities like John Travolta, Peter Frampton and Frank Sinatra for the pages of Time Magazine and Newsweek Magazine.

At 21 years of age, Wishna founded Globalforce International, an executive search consulting firm. Clients consisted of Fortune 500 manufacturing and service companies, including Bristol-Meyers, JP Morgan and Chase Manhattan Bank.

In 1999 Wishna founded CPAmerica Inc., a consulting firm specializing in mergers, acquisitions, and special entertainment projects for the gaming, lodging and leisure industry. He opened offices in Florida, New York City and Las Vegas.

== Death ==
On November 27, 2012, Wishna was found in his car at his home in Henderson, Nevada, dead from carbon monoxide poisoning. The death was ruled a suicide. He was 54 years old.
