= Winhall, Vermont =

- Town
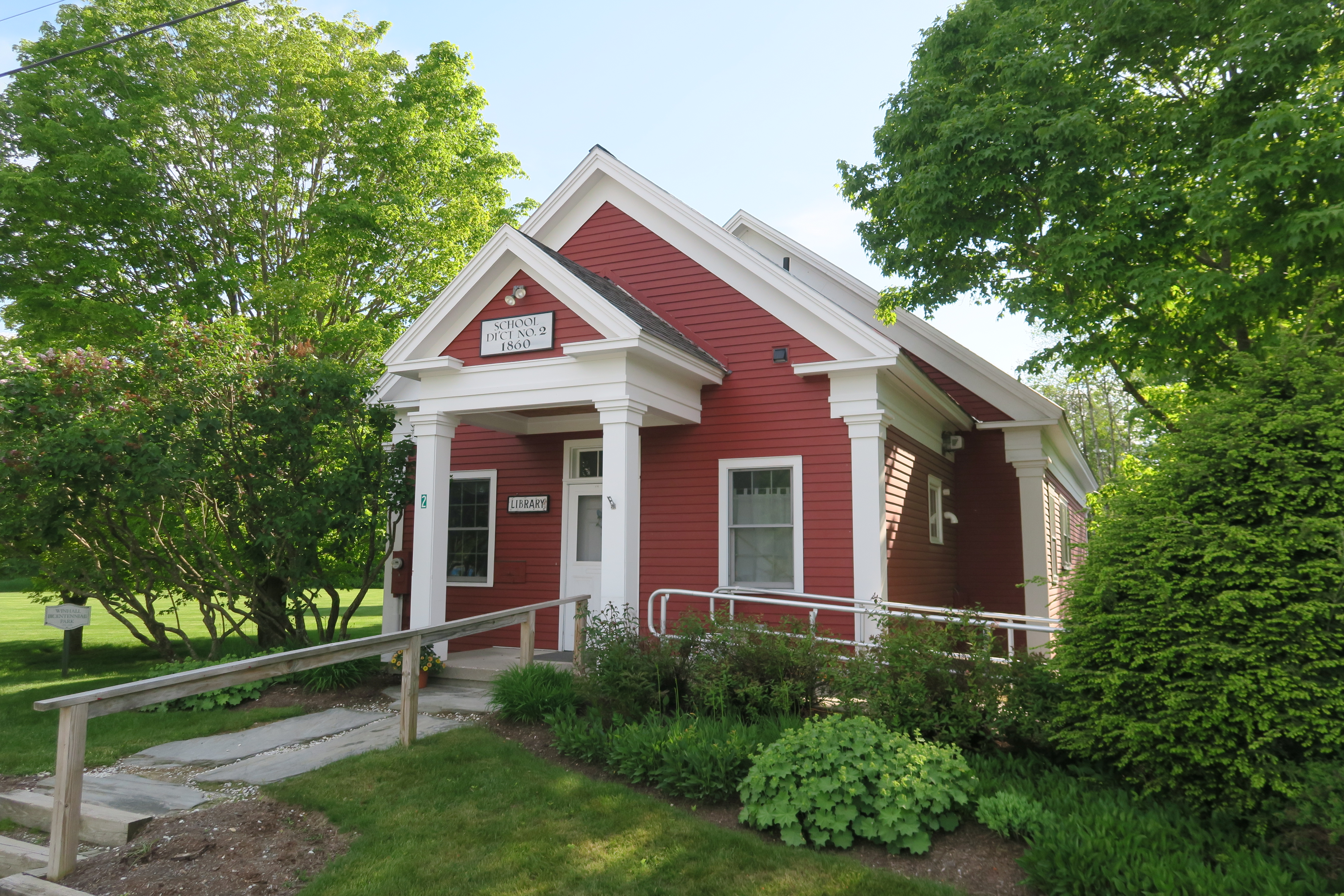
- Winhall Memorial Library

- Wordmark

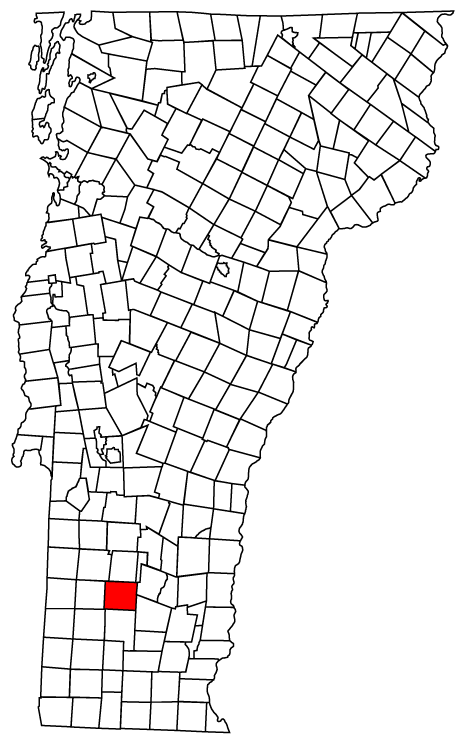
- Winhall, Vermont
- Coordinates: 43°08′50″N 72°55′48″W
- Country: United States
- State: Vermont
- County: Bennington
- Community: Bondville

Area
  - Total: 44.0 sq mi (114.0 km^{2})
  - Land: 43.6 sq mi (112.8 km^{2})
  - Water: 0.46 sq mi (1.2 km^{2})
- Elevation: 1,788 ft (545 m)

Population (2020)
  - Total: 1,182
  - Density: 27/sq mi (10.5/km^{2})
- Time zone: UTC-5 (Eastern (EST))
  - Summer (DST): UTC-4 (EDT)
- ZIP code: 05340
- Area code: 802
- FIPS code: 50-85075
- GNIS feature ID: 1462267
- Website: www.winhall.org

Winhall is a town in Bennington County, Vermont, United States. The population was 1,182 at the 2020 census. In the southeastern corner of the town is the unincorporated village of Bondville. Half of the community of Stratton Mountain, part of Stratton Mountain Resort, is in the southern part of the town.

== Geography ==
Winhall is located in northeastern Bennington County and is bordered by Windham County to the east and south. The town is located in the Green Mountains with the crest of the range running from north to south through the western part of the town.

According to the United States Census Bureau, the town has a total area of 44.0 square miles (114.0 km^{2}), of which 43.6 square miles (112.8 km^{2}) are land and 0.46 square miles (1.2 km^{2}), or 1.08%, is water. The majority of the town drains eastward via the Winhall River to the West River, a tributary of the Connecticut River. The western portion of the town drains to the Batten Kill, a tributary of the Hudson River.

== Demographics ==
Historical population
Census	Pop.	Note	%±
1790	155		—
1800	202		30.3%
1810	429		112.4%
1820	428		−0.2%
1830	571		33.4%
1840	576		0.9%
1850	762		32.3%
1860	741		−2.8%
1870	842		13.6%
1880	722		−14.3%
1890	523		−27.6%
1900	449		−14.1%
1910	366		−18.5%
1920	336		−8.2%
1930	229		−31.8%
1940	212		−7.4%
1950	255		20.3%
1960	245		−3.9%
1970	281		14.7%
1980	327		16.4%
1990	482		47.4%
2000	702		45.6%
2010	769		9.5%
2020	1,182		53.7%
U.S. Decennial Census

As of the census of 2000, there were 702 people, 310 households, and 204 families residing in the town. The population density was 16.1 people per square mile (6.2/km^{2}). There were 1,717 housing units at an average density of 39.3 per square mile (15.2/km^{2}). The racial makeup of the town was 98.29% White, 0.43% African American, 0.14% Asian, and 1.14% from two or more races. Hispanic or Latino of any race were 2.71% of the population.

There were 310 households, out of which 24.2% had children under the age of 18 living with them, 56.5% were married couples living together, 5.8% had a female householder with no husband present, and 33.9% were non-families. 24.8% of all households were made up of individuals, and 10.0% had someone living alone who was 65 years of age or older. The average household size was 2.26 and the average family size was 2.66.

In the town, the population was spread out, with 17.2% under the age of 18, 5.8% from 18 to 24, 26.2% from 25 to 44, 30.9% from 45 to 64, and 19.8% who were 65 years of age or older. The median age was 45 years. For every 100 females, there were 97.7 males. For every 100 females age 18 and over, there were 95.0 males.

The median income for a household in the town was $57,750, and the median income for a family was $65,000. Males had a median income of $35,096 versus $22,969 for females. The per capita income for the town was $30,378. About 1.0% of families and 4.0% of the population were below the poverty line, including 4.0% of those under age 18 and none of those age 65 or over.

== Notable people ==
- Blackleach Burritt, clergyman during the American Revolution
- Rachel Brooks Gleason, the fourth woman to earn a medical degree and practice medicine in the United States
- Helen Nearing, writer lived in Winhall in the 1930s and 1940s
- Scott Nearing, writer lived in Winhall in the 1930s and 1940s
