= Bob Blazekovic =

American tennis player

- Full name: Robert Blazekovic
- Country (sports): United States
- Born: May 26, 1960 (age 66)
- Plays: Right-handed

Singles
- Career record: 1–2
- Highest ranking: No. 273 (Jan 4, 1982)

Robert Blazekovic (born May 26, 1960) is an American former professional tennis player.

Blazekovic grew up in Battle Creek, Michigan and attended Springfield High School, where he won two state titles in singles. On the professional tour, Blazekovic attained a best singles world ranking of 273. In 1985 he qualified for the main draw of the Volvo International in Stratton Mountain was beaten by Jimmy Connors in the first round.
