= Rachel Brooks Gleason =

American physician (1820–1905)

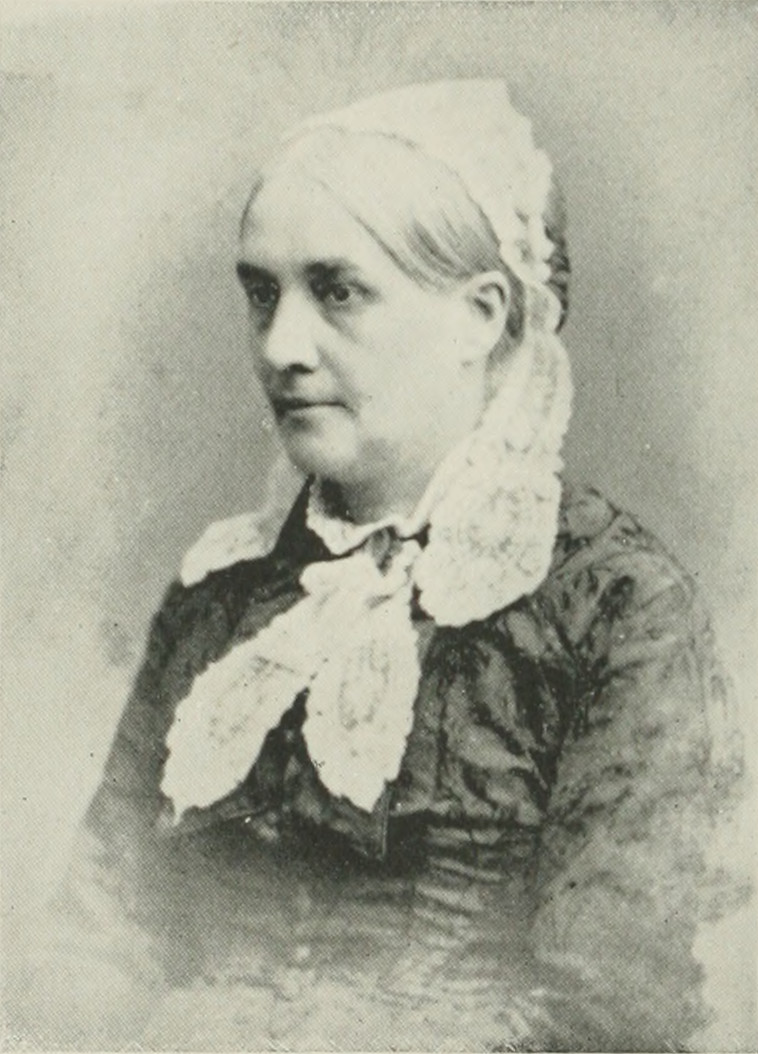
Rachel Brooks Gleason

Rachel Brooks Gleason (November 27, 1820 – March 13, 1905) was an American physician, the fourth woman to earn a medical degree in the United States.

== Early life ==
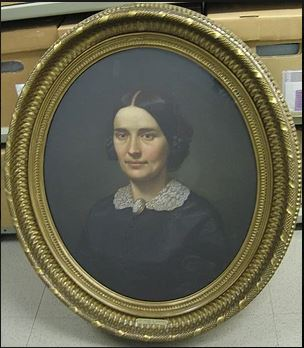
Rachel Brooks Gleason

Rachel Ingall Brooks was born in the village of Winhall, Vermont, on November 27, 1820, the daughter of Rueben Brooks and Lucy Musey. She had two siblings: John Quincy Brooks and Lucy Zipporah Brooks.

No colleges were open for women during her girlhood, but Gleason gave herself a fair collegiate education from college text-books studied at home. Her husband, Dr. Silas O. Gleason, when he became professor of hygiene in the Central Medical College in Rochester, New York, succeeded in persuading the faculty and trustees to open the college doors to women. Rachel Brooks Gleason studied with her husband and was graduated in medicine in 1851. She was the fourth woman to earn a medical degree in the United States.

== Career ==
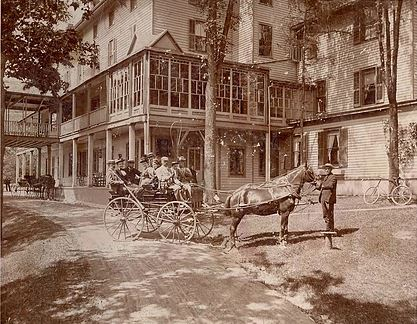
Elmira Water Cure

After graduation, Gleason practiced three years in a sanitarium in Glen Haven, New York, and one year in Ithaca, New York. She was at the head of the Elmira Water Cure, opened in 1852, later known as Gleason Sanitarium, in Elmira, New York, for more than forty years. The hydropathic health resort catered to women of the upper class, their specialty was "lady troubles". The Gleasons sold the business in 1899, and all the buildings were demolished in 1959.

She had a large consulting practice, extending to most of the towns in the State. Her book on home treatment for invalids, Talks to my Patients: hints on getting well and keeping well (New York, 1870) ran into its eighth edition. After her graduation in medicine, she gave lectures on physiology and hygiene to women, assisted by the best models and charts to be had at the time.

She held bible and prayer classes every Saturday for twenty-five years. She was an advocate of dress reform and women's freedom from early girlhood. She assisted eighteen women students through medical colleges, all of whom were dependent upon her for financial support, and most of them rescued from invalidism. Many of these students became prominent, and all were competent physicians. Gleason was a strong anti-slavery worker before the Civil War, and rendered constant assistance to Freedmen's schools thereafter.

== Personal life ==
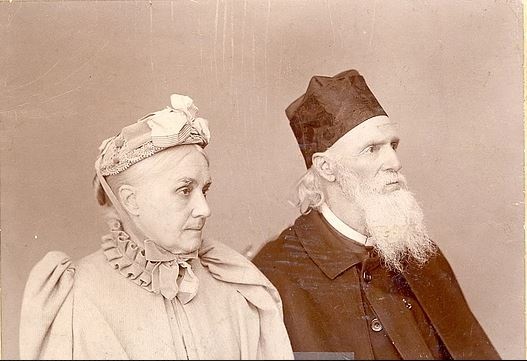
Rachel Brooks Gleason and Silas O. Gleason

Gleason was a teacher from choice, not from necessity, much of the time up to her marriage on July 3, 1844, to Dr. Silas Oresmus Gleason (1818–1899). They had two children: E.B. Gleason and Adele Amelia Gleason (died in 1930).

Gleason died on March 13, 1905, and is buried at Woodlawn Cemetery, Elmira.
