= Rock City Club =

Social Music Network

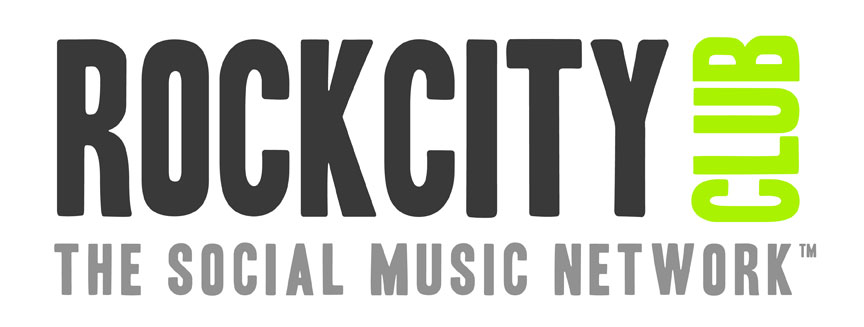

Rock City Club was created by Jack Wishna, Ofek Hayon, Brian Silver, music promoter Don Kirshner, and Michael Jackson. The management team, partners, and investors attracted to the business include Internet entrepreneurs and music industry executives. One of the original creators of MTV and the co-founder of Internet service provider NetZero are listed among the company's board. It was described by the company as "the music industry's first Social Music Network". It serves to merge "the Internet, venues, undiscovered talent, industry experts and superstars".

Some of the biggest music producers in the world, with 162 Grammy Awards to their names, participate in Rock City Club. The Rockcityclub.com "Producers' Circle" includes Phil Ramone and Ron Dante and the people behind acts such as Lady Gaga, Madonna, Jay-Z, Michael Jackson, and Amy Winehouse.

In 2012, Rock City Club partnered with Slacker online music service to create what it described as the world's first internet music channel devoted exclusively to giving undiscovered artists and bands the chance to have their music heard by millions of potential fans. The channel was headed by Ron Dante and includes the production expertise of people like Phil Ramone, Kerry Gordy (son of Motown legend Berry Gordy), and Lamont Dozier.
