= Bondville, Vermont =

- Village
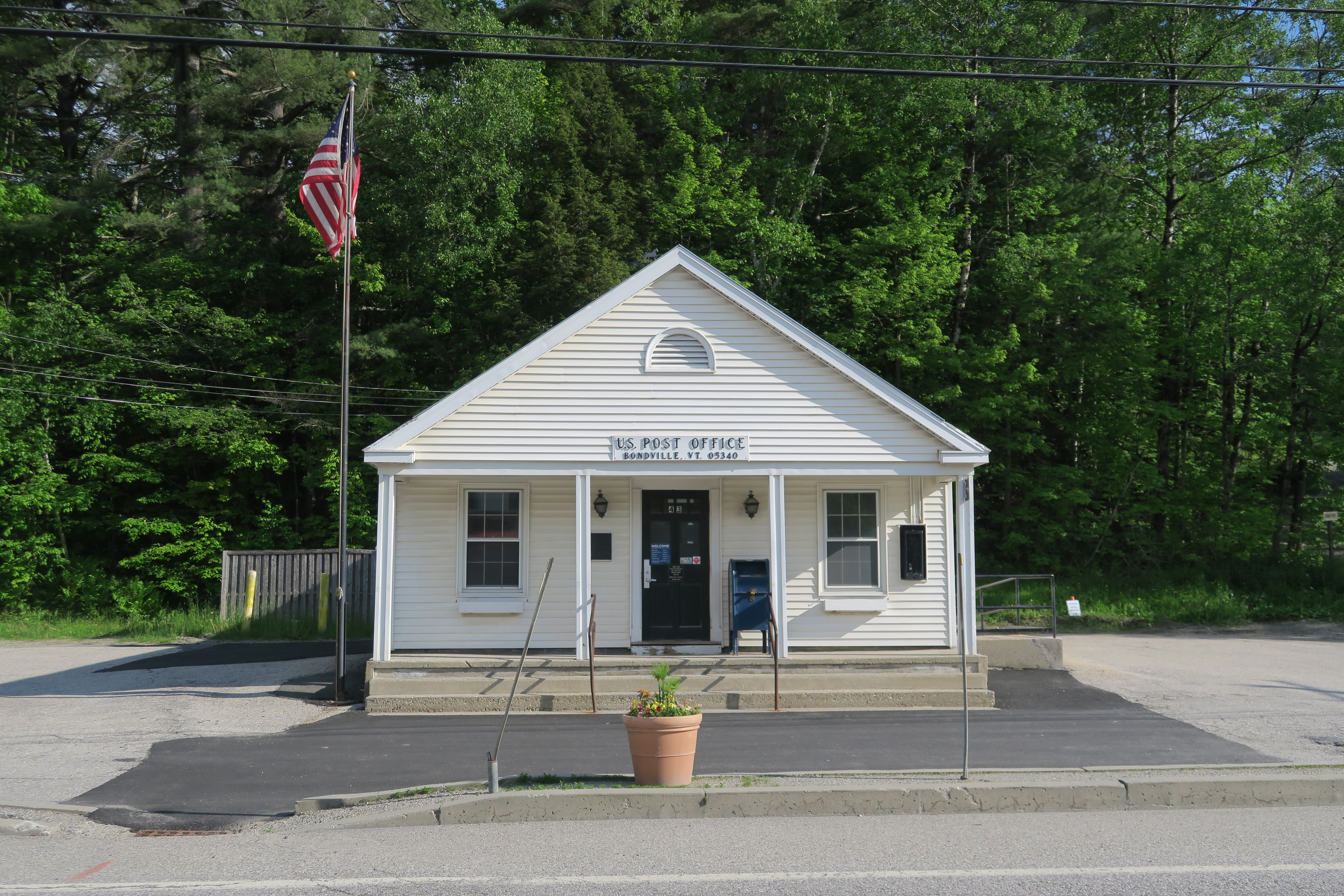
- Post Office

- Location within Vermont
- Coordinates: 43°08′41″N 72°52′29″W
- Country: United States
- State: Vermont
- County: Bennington
- Elevation: 1,280 ft (390 m)
- Time zone: UTC-5 (Eastern (EST))
  - Summer (DST): UTC-4 (EDT)
- ZIP code: 05340
- Area code: 802
- GNIS feature ID: 1461709

Bondville is an unincorporated village in the town of Winhall, Bennington County, Vermont, United States. The community is located along Vermont Route 30, 10 miles (16 km) east of the village of Manchester. Bondville has a post office with ZIP code 05340, which opened on May 23, 1850.

Bondville hosts the smallest and oldest consecutive running fair in Vermont. It was first held in 1797.
