= Stratton Mountain, Vermont =

Census-designated place in Vermont, United States

- Census-designated place
- Location within Vermont Location within the United States
- Coordinates: 43°07′21″N 72°54′04″W
- Country: United States
- State: Vermont
- Counties: Bennington; Windham
- Towns: Winhall; Stratton

Area
  - Total: 2.66 sq mi (6.88 km^{2})
  - Land: 2.63 sq mi (6.80 km^{2})
  - Water: 0.031 sq mi (0.08 km^{2})
- Elevation: 1,972 ft (601 m)
- Time zone: UTC-5 (Eastern (EST))
  - Summer (DST): UTC-4 (EDT)
- ZIP Codes: 05155 (South Londonderry); 05340 (Bondville); 05343 (Jamaica)
- Area code: 802
- FIPS code: 50-70825
- GNIS feature ID: 2807126

Stratton Mountain is a resort community and census-designated place (CDP) in Bennington and Windham counties, Vermont, United States. Sitting at the northern foot of Stratton Mountain and its ski resort, it was first listed as a CDP prior to the 2020 census. As of the 2020 census, Stratton Mountain had a population of 335.

The southern half of the community, including the base of the ski area, is in the town of Stratton in Windham County, while the northern half, including the Stratton Golf Course, is in the town of Winhall in Bennington County. Stratton Mountain Access Road leads north 3 miles (5 km) to Vermont Route 30 in Bondville, while to the southeast Pikes Falls Road leads 8 miles (13 km) to Route 30 in the village of Jamaica.
