= 1988 Wimbledon Championships – Men's doubles qualifying =

Men's doubles qualifying
- 1988 Wimbledon Championships

Events
| Singles | men | women | | boys | girls |
| Doubles | men | women | mixed | boys | girls |
| WC Singles | men | women | quad |
| WC Doubles | men | women | quad |
| Legends | men | women | seniors |

Qualification
| Singles | men | women |
| Doubles | men | women | mixed |
- Wimbledon Championships

Players and pairs who neither have high enough rankings nor receive wild cards may participate in a qualifying tournament held one week before the annual Wimbledon Tennis Championships.

== Seeds ==
1. (United States) Jon Levine / (United States) Brad Pearce (second round)
2. (Brazil) Givaldo Barbosa / (Brazil) Mauro Menezes (qualifying competition, lucky losers)
3. (United States) Mark Basham / (United States) Luke Jensen (qualified)
4. (South Africa) Craig Campbell / (United States) Dan Cassidy (first round)
5. (Brazil) Alexandre Hocevar / (Brazil) Marcos Hocevar (second round)
6. (South Africa) Brian Levine / (United States) Peter Palandjian (second round, withdrew)
7. (South Africa) Neil Broad / (South Africa) Stefan Kruger (qualified)
8. (United States) John Letts / (United States) Craig D. Miller (second round)
9. (South Africa) Warren Green / (South Africa) Piet Norval (second round)
10. (Australia) Shane Barr / (Australia) Roger Rasheed (second round)

== Qualifiers ==
1. (France) Thierry Champion / (France) Éric Winogradsky
2. (Switzerland) Stephan Medem / (Finland) Olli Rahnasto
3. (United States) Mark Basham (United States) Luke Jensen
4. (South Africa) Neil Broad / (South Africa) Stefan Kruger
5. (United States) Steve DeVries / (United States) Richard Matuszewski

== Lucky losers ==
1. (Brazil) Givaldo Barbosa / (Brazil) Mauro Menezes
2. (West Germany) Heiner Moraing / (West Germany) Peter Moraing
3. (India) Zeeshan Ali / (India) Mark Ferreira
4. (United Kingdom) Austen Brice / (United Kingdom) Jason Goodall

== Qualifying draw ==
=== First qualifier ===
First round
1 | (United States) Jon Levine (United States) Brad Pearce | 6 | 7
(Canada) Geoff Roper (Australia) Des Tyson | 3 | 5
(France) Thierry Champion (France) Éric Winogradsky | 7^{10} | 4 | 6
(United States) Doug Stone (Republic of Ireland) Peter Wright | 6^{8} | 6 | 1
(United States) Brett Buffington (Italy) Gianluca Pozzi | 6^{6} | 6^{5}
(Romania) Mihnea-Ion Năstase (United States) John Sobel | 7^{8} | 7^{7}
(Japan) Shigeyuki Nishio (Japan) Shinichi Sakamoto | 4 | 7^{7} | 3
10 | (Australia) Shane Barr (Australia) Roger Rasheed | 6 | 6^{4} | 6

Second round
1 | (United States) Jon Levine (United States) Brad Pearce | 2 | 2
(France) Thierry Champion (France) Éric Winogradsky | 6 | 6
(Romania) Mihnea-Ion Năstase (United States) John Sobel | 7^{7} | 6
(Australia) Shane Barr (Australia) Roger Rasheed | 6^{5} | 4

Qualifying competition
(France) Thierry Champion (France) Éric Winogradsky | 6 | 6 | 6
(Romania) Mihnea-Ion Năstase (United States) John Sobel | 4 | 4 | 4

=== Second qualifier ===
First round
2 | (Brazil) Givaldo Barbosa (Brazil) Mauro Menezes | 6 | 6^{3} | 6
(United States) Howard Endelman (Australia) Gavin Pfitzner | 1 | 7^{7} | 4
(India) Ashok Amritraj (India) Srinivasan Vasudevan | 2 | 4
(Venezuela) Nicolás Pereira (Brazil) João Soares | 6 | 6
(South Africa) Barry Moir (South Africa) Kevin Moir | 6^{2} | 3
(Switzerland) Stephan Medem (Finland) Olli Rahnasto | 7^{7} | 6
(New Zealand) David Lewis (Canada) Chris Pridham | 4 | 4
9 | (South Africa) Warren Green (South Africa) Piet Norval | 6 | 6

Second round
2 | (Brazil) Givaldo Barbosa (Brazil) Mauro Menezes | 7^{7} | 6
(Venezuela) Nicolás Pereira (Brazil) João Soares | 6^{5} | 3
(Switzerland) Stephan Medem (Finland) Olli Rahnasto | 7^{7} | 7^{7}
9 | (South Africa) Warren Green (South Africa) Piet Norval | 6^{4} | 6^{4}

Qualifying competition
2 | (Brazil) Givaldo Barbosa (Brazil) Mauro Menezes | 6^{3} | 1 | 6 | 6^{6}
(Switzerland) Stephan Medem (Finland) Olli Rahnasto | 7^{7} | 6 | 2 | 7^{8}

=== Third qualifier ===
First round
3 | (United States) Mark Basham (United States) Luke Jensen | 6 | 6
(United Kingdom) Sean Cole (Australia) Richard Fricker | 4 | 3
(South Africa) Andrew Burrow (South Africa) Denys Maasdorp | 6 | 6
WC | (United Kingdom) Paul Hand (United Kingdom) Stephen Heron | 1 | 0
(West Germany) Heiner Moraing (West Germany) Peter Moraing | 7 | 0 | 6
(Australia) Antony Emerson (United States) Jim Gurfein | 5 | 6 | 4
(West Germany) Harald Rittersbacher (South Africa) Michael Robertson | 2 | 3
8 | (United States) John Letts (United States) Craig D. Miller | 6 | 6

Second round
3 | (United States) Mark Basham (United States) Luke Jensen | 7^{7} | 6^{6} | 6
(South Africa) Andrew Burrow (South Africa) Denys Maasdorp | 6^{3} | 7^{8} | 2
(West Germany) Heiner Moraing (West Germany) Peter Moraing | 6 | 6
8 | (United States) John Letts (United States) Craig D. Miller | 4 | 4

Qualifying competition
3 | (United States) Mark Basham (United States) Luke Jensen | 7^{7} | 6 | 6
(West Germany) Heiner Moraing (West Germany) Peter Moraing | 6^{5} | 2 | 2

=== Fourth qualifier ===
First round
4 | (South Africa) Craig Campbell (United States) Dan Cassidy | 4 | 6^{0}
(India) Zeeshan Ali (India) Mark Ferreira | 6 | 7^{7}
(Australia) Paul Hoysted (Japan) Hitoshi Shirato | 5 | 3
(South Africa) Marius Barnard (South Africa) Byron Talbot | 7 | 6
(Denmark) Morten Christensen (Denmark) Peter Flintsø | 6^{4} | 6 | 7
WC | (United Kingdom) Chris Clarke (United Kingdom) Francis Mackie | 7^{7} | 4 | 9
(Jamaica) Doug Burke (South Africa) Royce Deppe | 7^{7} | 2 | 2
7 | (South Africa) Neil Broad (South Africa) Stefan Kruger | 6^{4} | 6 | 6

Second round
(India) Zeeshan Ali (India) Mark Ferreira | 2 | 7^{7} | 6
(South Africa) Marius Barnard (South Africa) Byron Talbot | 6 | 6^{4} | 3
(United Kingdom) Chris Clarke (United Kingdom) Francis Mackie | 4 | 1
7 | (South Africa) Neil Broad (South Africa) Stefan Kruger | 6 | 6

Qualifying competition
(India) Zeeshan Ali (India) Mark Ferreira | 6 | 4 | 6 | 6
7 | (South Africa) Neil Broad (South Africa) Stefan Kruger | 2 | 6 | 3 | 4

=== Fifth qualifier ===
First round
5 | (Brazil) Alexandre Hocevar (Brazil) Marcos Hocevar | 2 | 6 | 6
(South Africa) Lan Bale (South Africa) Brent Haygarth | 6 | 3 | 4
(United States) Michael Kures (Mexico) Agustín Moreno | 6 | 5 | 1
(United States) Steve DeVries (United States) Richard Matuszewski | 3 | 7 | 6
WC | (United Kingdom) Peter Russell (United Kingdom) Andrew Sproule | 6 | 3 | 7
(United Kingdom) Austen Brice (United Kingdom) Jason Goodall | 4 | 6 | 9
(United States) Stephen Aniston (Australia) Brett Custer | 6^{3} | 4
6 | (South Africa) Brian Levine (United States) Peter Palandjian | 7^{7} | 6

Second round
5 | (Brazil) Alexandre Hocevar (Brazil) Marcos Hocevar | 7^{7} | 6^{1} | 4
(United States) Steve DeVries (United States) Richard Matuszewski | 6^{4} | 7^{7} | 6
(United Kingdom) Austen Brice (United Kingdom) Jason Goodall
6 | (South Africa) Brian Levine (United States) Peter Palandjian | w/o

Qualifying competition
(United States) Steve DeVries (United States) Richard Matuszewski | 6 | 6 | 6
(United Kingdom) Austen Brice (United Kingdom) Jason Goodall | 3 | 4 | 4
