= 1989 U.S. Pro Tennis Championships – Doubles =

Doubles
- 1989 U.S. Pro Tennis Championships

Final
- Champions: (Ecuador) Andrés Gómez (Argentina) Alberto Mancini
- Runners-up: (United States) Todd Nelson (United States) Phil Williamson
- Score: 7–6, 6–2

Details
- Draw: 28 (3WC)
- Seeds: 8

Events
Singles	Doubles
← 1988 ·	U.S. Pro Tennis Championships	· 1990 →

Jorge Lozano and Todd Witsken were the defending champions, but none competed this year. Lozano opted to rest in order to compete in the Davis Cup the following week, while Witsken chose to compete at Gstaad during the same week, winning that title.

Andrés Gómez and Alberto Mancini won the title by defeating Todd Nelson and Phil Williamson 7–6, 6–2 in the final.

== Seeds ==
The first four seeds received a bye to the second round.

1. (United States) Tim Pawsat / (Australia) Laurie Warder (semifinals)
2. (Brazil) Luiz Mattar / (Uruguay) Diego Pérez (second round)
3. (Ecuador) Andrés Gómez / (Argentina) Alberto Mancini (champions)
4. (United States) Charles Beckman / (United States) Steve DeVries (quarterfinals)
5. (United States) Kelly Jones / (United States) Brad Pearce (first round)
6. (Spain) Juan Carlos Báguena / (United States) Rill Baxter (second round)
7. (United States) Luke Jensen / (United States) Richey Reneberg (first round)
8. (Peru) Pablo Arraya / (Chile) Pedro Rebolledo (first round)

== Draw ==
=== Key ===
- Q = Qualifier
- WC = Wild card
- LL = Lucky loser
- Alt = Alternate
- ITF = ITF entry
- PR = Protected ranking
- SR = Special ranking
- SE = Special exempt
- JE = Junior exempt
- JR = Junior Accelerator Programme entrant
- CO = College Accelerator Programme entrant
- NG = Next Gen Accelerator Program entrant
- w/o = Walkover
- r = Retired
- d = Defaulted

=== Finals ===
Semifinals
1	(United States) Tim Pawsat (Australia) Laurie Warder	4	4
3	(Ecuador) Andrés Gómez (Argentina) Alberto Mancini	6	6
(United States) Shelby Cannon (United States) Brian Page	6	4
(United States) Todd Nelson (United States) Phil Williamson	7	6

Final
3	(Ecuador) Andrés Gómez (Argentina) Alberto Mancini	7	6
(United States) Todd Nelson (United States) Phil Williamson	6	2

=== Top half ===
First round
(Argentina) R Argüello (Argentina) M Ingaramo	3	6
(United States) H Endelman (United States) J Sobel	6	7
(United States) J Berger (Puerto Rico) M Nido	4	6	6
(United States) C Boynton (United States) T Mercer	6	4	2
(Australia) R Fromberg (Australia) D Tyson	6	6
8	(Peru) P Arraya (Chile) P Rebolledo	3	4
(Jamaica) D Burke (South Africa) B Moir	6	3	4
(United States) R Schmidt (United States) T Siegel	3	6	6
WC	(United States) Jeff Duncan (United States) L Duncan	1	2
(United States) J Arias (South Africa) R Deppe	6	6
(United States) K Lubbers (United States) Robert Pellizzi	2	6
6	(Spain) JC Báguena (United States) R Baxter	6	7

Second round
1	(United States) T Pawsat (Australia) L Warder	7	7
(United States) H Endelman (United States) J Sobel	5	5
(United States) J Berger (Puerto Rico) M Nido	6	6	3
(Australia) R Fromberg (Australia) D Tyson	7	4	6
3	(Ecuador) A Gómez (Argentina) A Mancini	6	6
(United States) R Schmidt (United States) T Siegel	2	4
(United States) J Arias (South Africa) R Deppe	6	6
6	(Spain) JC Báguena (United States) R Baxter	4	4

Quarterfinals
1	(United States) T Pawsat (Australia) L Warder	6	2	6
(Australia) R Fromberg (Australia) D Tyson	4	6	2
3	(Ecuador) A Gómez (Argentina) A Mancini	6	6
(United States) J Arias (South Africa) R Deppe	4	1

Semifinals
1	(United States) T Pawsat (Australia) L Warder	4	4
3	(Ecuador) A Gómez (Argentina) A Mancini	6	6

=== Bottom half ===
First round
5	(United States) K Jones (United States) B Pearce	6	3	4
WC	(United States) Bill Benjes (United States) A Engle	4	6	6
(United States) S Cannon (United States) B Page	6	6
(Australia) B Dyke (South Africa) M Robertson	3	3
(West Germany) K Braasch (West Germany) D Leppen	6	6
WC	(United States) Paul Palandjian (United States) Pe Palandjian	3	3
7	(United States) L Jensen (United States) R Reneberg	7	3	6
(United States) T Nelson (United States) P Williamson	6	6	7
(Australia) B Custer (Australia) S Youl	5	7	4
(Argentina) G Giussani (Argentina) G Rivas	7	5	6
(Argentina) E Bengoechea (United States) J Ross	4	3
(Spain) J Arrese (Argentina) M Jaite	6	6

Second round
WC	(United States) B Benjes (United States) A Engle	4	4
(United States) S Cannon (United States) B Page	6	6
(West Germany) K Braasch (West Germany) D Leppen	6	4
4	(United States) C Beckman (United States) S DeVries	7	6
(United States) T Nelson (United States) P Williamson	6	6
(Argentina) G Giussani (Argentina) G Rivas	4	1
(Spain) J Arrese (Argentina) M Jaite	6	3	6
2	(Brazil) L Mattar (Uruguay) D Pérez	4	6	3

Quarterfinals
(United States) S Cannon (United States) B Page	3	6	6
4	(United States) C Beckman (United States) S DeVries	6	3	4
(United States) T Nelson (United States) P Williamson	6	6
(Spain) J Arrese (Argentina) M Jaite	2	1

Semifinals
(United States) S Cannon (United States) B Page	6	4
(United States) T Nelson (United States) P Williamson	7	6
