= 1988 U.S. Pro Tennis Championships – Doubles =

Doubles
- 1988 U.S. Pro Tennis Championships

Final
- Champions: (Mexico) Jorge Lozano (United States) Todd Witsken
- Runners-up: (Socialist Federal Republic of Yugoslavia) Bruno Orešar (Peru) Jaime Yzaga
- Score: 6–2, 7–5

Details
- Draw: 28 (2WC)
- Seeds: 8

Events
Singles	Doubles
- U.S. Pro Tennis Championships

Hans Gildemeister and Andrés Gómez were the defending champions, but none competed this year. Gildemeister retired from professional tennis during this season, having played his last tournament at Rome. Gómez chost to compete at Gstaad during the same week, finishing as runner-up alongside Emilio Sánchez.

Jorge Lozano and Todd Witsken won the title by defeating Bruno Orešar and Jaime Yzaga 6–2, 7–5 in the final.

== Seeds ==
The first four seeds received a bye to the second round.

1. (Mexico) Jorge Lozano / (United States) Todd Witsken (champions)
2. (United States) Brad Gilbert / (United States) Patrick McEnroe (quarterfinals)
3. (United States) Mike De Palmer / (United States) Gary Donnelly (quarterfinals)
4. (Socialist Federal Republic of Yugoslavia) Bruno Orešar / (Peru) Jaime Yzaga (final)
5. (United States) Luke Jensen / (United States) Tim Pawsat (semifinals)
6. (France) Loïc Courteau / (Australia) Michael Fancutt (first round)
7. (United States) Dan Cassidy / (United States) Mel Purcell (first round)
8. (United States) Jimmy Arias / (United States) Tim Siegel (first round)

== Draw ==
Key

- Q = Qualifier
- WC = Wild card
- LL = Lucky loser
- Alt = Alternate
- ITF = ITF entry
- PR = Protected ranking
- SR = Special ranking
- SE = Special exempt
- JE = Junior exempt
- JR = Junior Accelerator Programme entrant
- CO = College Accelerator Programme entrant
- NG = Next Gen Accelerator Program entrant
- w/o = Walkover
- r = Retired
- d = Defaulted

=== Finals ===
Semifinals
1	(Mexico) Jorge Lozano (United States) Todd Witsken	6	6
5	(United States) Luke Jensen (United States) Tim Pawsat	0	1
4	(Brazil) Luiz Mattar (Uruguay) Diego Pérez	6	3
(Socialist Federal Republic of Yugoslavia) Bruno Orešar (Peru) Jaime Yzaga	7	6

Final
1	(Mexico) Jorge Lozano (United States) Todd Witsken	6	7
4	(Socialist Federal Republic of Yugoslavia) Bruno Orešar (Peru) Jaime Yzaga	2	5

=== Top half ===
First round
(Peru) P Arraya (Sweden) R Bergh	6	6
(United States) J Brown (United States) L Duncan	1	4
(United States) C Boynton (United States) M Kures	6	3
WC	(South Africa) M Kaplan (South Africa) R Lubner	7	6
(Argentina) H de la Peña (Australia) D Macpherson	6	6
8	(United States) J Arias (United States) T Siegel	4	2
(Spain) J Aguilera (Spain) J Bardou	4	0
WC	(United States) B Farrow (United States) J Tarango	6	6
(West Germany) A Mronz (Austria) T Muster	1	2
(United States) R Reneberg (United States) J Ross	6	6
(United States) J Gurfein (West Germany) M Westphal	2	3
5	(United States) L Jensen (United States) T Pawsat	6	6

Second round
1	(Mexico) J Lozano (United States) T Witsken	6	6	6
(Peru) P Arraya (Sweden) R Bergh	2	7	4
WC	(South Africa) M Kaplan (South Africa) R Lubner	6	6
(Argentina) H de la Peña (Australia) D Macpherson	7	7
3	(United States) M De Palmer (United States) G Donnelly	3	7	7
WC	(United States) B Farrow (United States) J Tarango	6	6	5
(United States) R Reneberg (United States) J Ross	2	6
5	(United States) L Jensen (United States) T Pawsat	6	7

Quarterfinals
1	(Mexico) J Lozano (United States) T Witsken	7	7
(Argentina) H de la Peña (Australia) D Macpherson	5	6
3	(United States) M De Palmer (United States) G Donnelly	2	7	2
5	(United States) L Jensen (United States) T Pawsat	6	6	6

Semifinals
1	(Mexico) J Lozano (United States) T Witsken	6	6
5	(United States) L Jensen (United States) T Pawsat	0	1

=== Bottom half ===
First round
6	(France) L Courteau (Australia) M Fancutt	6	7	1
(India) A Amritraj (Nigeria) T Mmoh	7	6	6
(Czechoslovakia) L Pimek (South Africa) M Robertson	3	6	4
(United States) H Endelman (United States) J Sobel	6	3	6
(United States) R Baxter (United States) M Dickson	6	6
(South Africa) C Campbell (South Africa) B Moir	0	4
7	(United States) D Cassidy (United States) M Purcell	4	4
(Socialist Federal Republic of Yugoslavia) B Orešar (Peru) J Yzaga	6	6
(United States) J Courier (United States) P Palandjian	6	3
(Spain) F Luna (Chile) P Rebolledo	7	6
(Argentina) R Argüello (Argentina) M Ingaramo	2	5
(United States) J Berger (South Africa) A Burrow	6	7

Second round
(India) A Amritraj (Nigeria) T Mmoh	7	4	4
(United States) H Endelman (United States) J Sobel	6	6	6
(United States) R Baxter (United States) M Dickson	4	4
4	(Brazil) L Mattar (Uruguay) D Pérez	6	6
(Socialist Federal Republic of Yugoslavia) B Orešar (Peru) J Yzaga	6	6
(Spain) F Luna (Chile) P Rebolledo	3	4
(United States) J Berger (South Africa) A Burrow	4	3
2	(United States) B Gilbert (United States) P McEnroe	6	6

Quarterfinals
(United States) H Endelman (United States) J Sobel	6	5	2
4	(Brazil) L Mattar (Uruguay) D Pérez	3	7	6
(Socialist Federal Republic of Yugoslavia) B Orešar (Peru) J Yzaga	2	6	6
2	(United States) B Gilbert (United States) P McEnroe	6	4	4

Semifinals
4	(Brazil) L Mattar (Uruguay) D Pérez	6	3
(Socialist Federal Republic of Yugoslavia) B Orešar (Peru) J Yzaga	7	6
