= 1988 Wimbledon Championships – Men's singles qualifying =

Men's singles qualifying
- 1988 Wimbledon Championships

Events
Singles	men	women		boys	girls
Doubles	men	women	mixed	boys	girls
WC Singles	men	women	quad
WC Doubles	men	women	quad
Legends	men	women	seniors

Qualification
Singles	men	women
Doubles	men	women	mixed
- Wimbledon Championships

Players and pairs who neither have high enough rankings nor receive wild cards may participate in a qualifying tournament held one week before the annual Wimbledon Tennis Championships.

== Seeds ==
1. (Australia) Jason Stoltenberg (qualified)
2. (Nigeria) Nduka Odizor (qualifying competition, lucky loser)
3. (The Bahamas) Roger Smith (first round)
4. (Canada) Martin Laurendeau (qualifying competition, lucky loser)
5. (United States) Scott Davis (second round)
6. (Soviet Union) Andrei Olhovskiy (qualified)
7. (West Germany) Heiner Moraing (qualified)
8. (Australia) Johan Anderson (qualifying competition)
9. (United States) Dan Cassidy (qualifying competition)
10. (South Africa) Barry Moir (qualified)
11. (Canada) Glenn Michibata (qualified)
12. (West Germany) Patrick Baur (first round)
13. (Italy) Diego Nargiso (qualified)
14. (United States) Rick Leach (second round)
15. (United States) Marc Flur (first round)
16. (Italy) Gianluca Pozzi (second round)
17. (Australia) Brad Drewett (qualifying competition)
18. (United States) Marcel Freeman (qualifying competition)
19. (South Africa) Michael Robertson (second round)
20. (United States) Luke Jensen (first round)
21. (United States) Bill Scanlon (qualified)
22. (France) Éric Winogradsky (qualifying competition)
23. (Italy) Omar Camporese (qualifying competition)
24. (Netherlands) Huub van Boeckel (qualified)
25. (Brazil) Danilo Marcelino (second round)
26. (South Africa) Danie Visser (second round)
27. (United States) Michael Kures (second round)
28. (West Germany) Michael Kupferschmid (second round)
29. (Australia) Carl Limberger (qualified)
30. (Australia) Richard Fromberg (second round)
31. (Soviet Union) Andrei Cherkasov (first round)
32. (Sweden) Tobias Svantesson (qualified)

== Qualifiers ==
1. (Australia) Jason Stoltenberg
2. (Sweden) Tobias Svantesson
3. (Socialist Federal Republic of Yugoslavia) Goran Ivanišević
4. (Australia) Carl Limberger
5. (Australia) Todd Woodbridge
6. (Soviet Union) Andrei Olhovskiy
7. (West Germany) Heiner Moraing
8. (South Africa) Gustav Fichardt
9. (Netherlands) Huub van Boeckel
10. (South Africa) Barry Moir
11. (Canada) Glenn Michibata
12. (United States) Bill Scanlon
13. (Italy) Diego Nargiso
14. (Australia) Shane Barr
15. (Chile) Ricardo Acuña
16. (United States) Glenn Layendecker

== Lucky losers ==
1. (Nigeria) Nduka Odizor
2. (Canada) Martin Laurendeau

== Qualifying draw ==
=== First qualifier ===
First round
1	(Australia) Jason Stoltenberg	6	6
(Philippines) Miguel Dungo	1	2
(South Africa) Stefan Kruger	6	6
WC	(United Kingdom) Paul Hand	2	1
(Switzerland) Stephan Medem	7^{7}	4	1
WC	(United Kingdom) Chris Wilkinson	6^{4}	6	6
(United States) Mike De Palmer	6	6
31	(Soviet Union) Andrei Cherkasov	3	1

Second round
1	(Australia) Jason Stoltenberg	4	6	7
(South Africa) Stefan Kruger	6	3	5
(United Kingdom) Chris Wilkinson	3	3
(United States) Mike De Palmer	6	6

Qualifying competition
1	(Australia) Jason Stoltenberg	7^{7}	5	6	6
(United States) Mike De Palmer	6^{5}	7	0	3

=== Second qualifier ===
First round
2	(Nigeria) Nduka Odizor	3	7	6
(United States) Mel Purcell	6	5	3
(Soviet Union) Dimitri Poliakov	6	3	5
(United States) Charles Beckman	4	6	7
(United States) John Sobel	7^{7}	6
(Australia) Richard Fricker	6^{3}	3
(Brazil) Luis Ruette	4	4
32	(Sweden) Tobias Svantesson	6	6

Second round
2	(Nigeria) Nduka Odizor	6	6
(United States) Charles Beckman	3	4
(United States) John Sobel	5	2
32	(Sweden) Tobias Svantesson	7	6

Qualifying competition
2	(Nigeria) Nduka Odizor	1	7^{7}	4	6^{3}
32	(Sweden) Tobias Svantesson	6	6^{4}	6	7^{7}

=== Third qualifier ===
First round
3	(The Bahamas) Roger Smith	2	3
(Australia) Des Tyson	6	6
(Netherlands) Johan Vekemans	7^{7}	3	2
WC	(United Kingdom) Laurence Matthews	6^{5}	6	6
(Socialist Federal Republic of Yugoslavia) Goran Ivanišević	4	6	6
(Sweden) Magnus Tideman	6	2	0
(Brazil) João Soares	2	6^{3}
30	(Australia) Richard Fromberg	6	7^{7}

Second round
(Australia) Des Tyson	6	2	3
WC	(United Kingdom) Laurence Matthews	4	6	6
(Socialist Federal Republic of Yugoslavia) Goran Ivanišević	6	2	6
30	(Australia) Richard Fromberg	3	6	3

Qualifying competition
WC	(United Kingdom) Laurence Matthews	1	6	6	4	1
(Socialist Federal Republic of Yugoslavia) Goran Ivanišević	6	3	4	6	6

=== Fourth qualifier ===
First round
4	(Canada) Martin Laurendeau	6	6
(Nigeria) Tony Mmoh	2	2
WC	(United Kingdom) Mike Walker	6	6
(Mexico) Alfonso González	3	2
WC	(United Kingdom) Danny Sapsford	4	2
(South Africa) Royce Deppe	6	6
(Denmark) Morten Christensen	3	1
29	(Australia) Carl Limberger	6	6

Second round
4	(Canada) Martin Laurendeau	6	6
(United Kingdom) Mike Walker	3	4
(South Africa) Royce Deppe	6	5	8
29	(Australia) Carl Limberger	1	7	10

Qualifying competition
4	(Canada) Martin Laurendeau	2	4	6^{4}
29	(Australia) Carl Limberger	6	6	7^{7}

=== Fifth qualifier ===
First round
5	(United States) Scott Davis	6	7^{7}
(United States) Wayne Hearn	2	6^{3}
(West Germany) Harald Rittersbacher	4	6^{5}
(Australia) Todd Woodbridge	6	7^{7}
(Australia) Roger Rasheed	7^{8}	2	6
(Italy) Alberto Paris	6^{6}	6	4
(South Africa) Andrew Burrow	7^{11}	6^{7}	4
27	(United States) Michael Kures	6^{9}	7^{9}	6

Second round
5	(United States) Scott Davis	3	6	3
(Australia) Todd Woodbridge	6	1	6
(Australia) Roger Rasheed	7^{7}	6^{3}	6
27	(United States) Michael Kures	6^{5}	7^{7}	1

Qualifying competition
(Australia) Todd Woodbridge	6	7	6
(Australia) Roger Rasheed	3	5	4

=== Sixth qualifier ===
First round
6	(Soviet Union) Andrei Olhovskiy	6	6
(United States) Scott Brown	2	1
(United States) Jon Levine	6	6
(South Africa) Howard Herr	2	1
(Canada) Geoff Roper	5	4
(Brazil) Givaldo Barbosa	7	6
(Jamaica) Doug Burke	6^{4}	7^{7}	4
28	(West Germany) Michael Kupferschmid	7^{7}	6^{4}	6

Second round
6	(Soviet Union) Andrei Olhovskiy	3	7^{7}	6
(United States) Jon Levine	6	6^{2}	2
(Brazil) Givaldo Barbosa	6	6
28	(West Germany) Michael Kupferschmid	3	3

Qualifying competition
6	(Soviet Union) Andrei Olhovskiy	6	6	6
(Brazil) Givaldo Barbosa	4	4	4

=== Seventh qualifier ===
First round
7	(West Germany) Heiner Moraing	7^{9}	4	6
(India) Zeeshan Ali	6^{7}	6	2
(United States) Steve DeVries	6	6
(South Africa) Denys Maasdorp	3	2
(Israel) Tomer Zimmerman	2	4
(India) Vijay Amritraj	6	6
(United States) Jim Gurfein	1	4
26	(South Africa) Danie Visser	6	6

Second round
7	(West Germany) Heiner Moraing	3	7^{7}	7
(United States) Steve DeVries	6	6^{5}	5
(India) Vijay Amritraj	6	3	6
26	(South Africa) Danie Visser	1	6	3

Qualifying competition
7	(West Germany) Heiner Moraing	7^{7}	4	6^{3}	7	8
(India) Vijay Amritraj	6^{3}	6	7^{7}	5	6

=== Eighth qualifier ===
First round
8	(Australia) Johan Anderson	4	6	6
(South Africa) Lan Bale	6	4	3
(Japan) Hitoshi Shirato	6	3	2
(Australia) Charlton Eagle	3	6	6
WC	(United Kingdom) Alex Rouse	6^{2}	4
(South Africa) Gustav Fichardt	7^{7}	6
(South Africa) Marius Barnard	4	5
25	(Brazil) Danilo Marcelino	6	6

Second round
8	(Australia) Johan Anderson	6	6
(Australia) Charlton Eagle	3	4
(South Africa) Gustav Fichardt	6	6
25	(Brazil) Danilo Marcelino	4	4

Qualifying competition
8	(Australia) Johan Anderson	4	5	4
(South Africa) Gustav Fichardt	6	7	6

=== Ninth qualifier ===
First round
9	(United States) Dan Cassidy	6	7^{7}
(United States) Kelly Jones	1	6^{5}
WC	(United States) Steve Denton	6	6
(Sweden) Lars Holmblad	4	3
(Australia) Peter Carter	7	6
(United States) Mark Basham	5	4
(United States) John Letts	6^{4}	3
24	(Netherlands) Huub van Boeckel	7^{7}	6

Second round
9	(United States) Dan Cassidy	7^{7}	6
WC	(United States) Steve Denton	6^{4}	3
(Australia) Peter Carter	6^{5}	2
24	(Netherlands) Huub van Boeckel	7^{7}	6

Qualifying competition
9	(United States) Dan Cassidy	6^{5}	6	1	4
24	(Netherlands) Huub van Boeckel	7^{7}	3	6	6

=== Tenth qualifier ===
First round
10	(South Africa) Barry Moir	6	3	8
(Mexico) Francisco Maciel	1	6	6
(South Africa) Eddie Edwards	6	5	6
(United States) Larry Scott	2	7	3
(South Africa) Brian Levine	7	4	6
(Republic of Ireland) Peter Wright	5	6	2
(United States) Robert Van't Hof	6^{5}	3
23	(Italy) Omar Camporese	7^{7}	6

Second round
10	(South Africa) Barry Moir	6	7
(South Africa) Eddie Edwards	3	5
(South Africa) Brian Levine	4	4
23	(Italy) Omar Camporese	6	6

Qualifying competition
10	(South Africa) Barry Moir	7^{9}	5	6	6^{2}	8
23	(Italy) Omar Camporese	6^{7}	7	2	7^{7}	6

=== Eleventh qualifier ===
First round
11	(Canada) Glenn Michibata	7	6
(United States) Brad Pearce	5	2
(South Africa) Byron Talbot	3	7^{7}	8
(United States) Stephen Aniston	6	6^{3}	10
WC	(United Kingdom) Stephen Heron	6	6
(United Kingdom) Stuart Bale	4	1
(Romania) Mihnea-Ion Năstase	2	4
22	(France) Éric Winogradsky	6	6

Second round
11	(Canada) Glenn Michibata	7^{7}	6
(United States) Stephen Aniston	6^{2}	3
(United Kingdom) Stephen Heron	5	2
22	(France) Éric Winogradsky	7	6

Qualifying competition
11	(Canada) Glenn Michibata	7^{7}	3	6	7^{7}
22	(France) Éric Winogradsky	6^{5}	6	3	6^{5}

=== Twelfth qualifier ===
First round
12	(West Germany) Patrick Baur	3	6^{4}
(South Africa) Craig Campbell	6	7^{7}
(Brazil) Alexandre Hocevar	4	6	6
(Israel) Amit Naor	6	3	4
(Venezuela) Nicolás Pereira	5	6	13
(India) Srinivasan Vasudevan	7	3	15
(South Africa) Emile Fourie	3	4
21	(United States) Bill Scanlon	6	6

Second round
(South Africa) Craig Campbell	3	3
(Brazil) Alexandre Hocevar	6	6
(India) Srinivasan Vasudevan	6^{2}	3
21	(United States) Bill Scanlon	7^{7}	6

Qualifying competition
(Brazil) Alexandre Hocevar	4	6^{6}	3
21	(United States) Bill Scanlon	6	7^{8}	6

=== Thirteenth qualifier ===
First round
13	(Italy) Diego Nargiso	7	6
(South Africa) Tertius Reynders	5	2
(South Africa) Brent Haygarth	6^{2}	2
(Australia) David Macpherson	7^{7}	6
(United States) David Dowlen	6^{4}	3
(South Africa) Piet Norval	7^{7}	6
(Finland) Olli Rahnasto	3	4
19	(South Africa) Michael Robertson	6	6

Second round
13	(Italy) Diego Nargiso	6	4	6
(Australia) David Macpherson	3	6	4
(South Africa) Piet Norval	7^{7}	6^{6}	6
19	(South Africa) Michael Robertson	6^{4}	7^{8}	4

Qualifying competition
13	(Italy) Diego Nargiso	6	6	7^{7}
(South Africa) Piet Norval	5	4	6^{5}

=== Fourteenth qualifier ===
First round
14	(United States) Rick Leach	6	6
(Brazil) Marcos Hocevar	3	4
(United States) Andy Kohlberg	4	5
(Australia) Shane Barr	6	7
(United States) Peter Palandjian	6	6
(United States) George Bezecny	4	3
(South Africa) Neil Broad	6	6
20	(United States) Luke Jensen	4	2

Second round
14	(United States) Rick Leach	6^{2}	6	5
(Australia) Shane Barr	7^{7}	1	7
(United States) Peter Palandjian	7	6^{3}	6
(South Africa) Neil Broad	5	7^{7}	4

Qualifying competition
(Australia) Shane Barr	6^{12}	6	3	6	6
(United States) Peter Palandjian	7^{14}	3	6	3	4

=== Fifteenth qualifier ===
First round
15	(United States) Marc Flur	1	4
(Chile) Ricardo Acuña	6	6
(South Africa) Warren Green	2	7^{7}	3
(West Germany) Peter Moraing	6	6^{4}	6
(Australia) Gavin Pfitzner	6	6
(South Africa) Marius Masencamp	2	3
(United States) Gary Donnelly	5	4
18	(United States) Marcel Freeman	7	6

Second round
(Chile) Ricardo Acuña	7^{7}	7^{7}
(West Germany) Peter Moraing	6^{2}	6^{3}
(Australia) Gavin Pfitzner	2	0
18	(United States) Marcel Freeman	6	6

Qualifying competition
(Chile) Ricardo Acuña	6	6^{5}	6	5
18	(United States) Marcel Freeman	3	7^{7}	2	2^{r}

=== Sixteenth qualifier ===
First round
16	(Italy) Gianluca Pozzi	7^{7}	6
WC	(United Kingdom) Jeffrey Hunter	6^{2}	2
(South Africa) Kevin Moir	3	2
(United States) Glenn Layendecker	6	6
(Japan) Tsuyoshi Fukui	1	0
(United States) Doug Stone	6	6
(Denmark) Peter Flintsø	1	3
17	(Australia) Brad Drewett	6	6

Second round
16	(Italy) Gianluca Pozzi	3	4
(United States) Glenn Layendecker	6	6
(United States) Doug Stone	2	3
17	(Australia) Brad Drewett	6	6

Qualifying competition
(United States) Glenn Layendecker	6	7^{7}	6
(Australia) Brad Drewett	4	6^{3}	4
