= 1988 U.S. Pro Tennis Championships – Singles =

Singles
- 1988 U.S. Pro Tennis Championships

Final
- Champion: (Austria) Thomas Muster
- Runner-up: (United States) Lawson Duncan
- Score: 6–2, 6–2

Details
- Draw: 56 (5WC/7Q)
- Seeds: 16

Events
Singles	Doubles
- U.S. Pro Tennis Championships

Mats Wilander was the defending champion, but lost in the quarterfinals to Horacio de la Peña.

Thomas Muster won the title by defeating Lawson Duncan 6–2, 6–2 in the final.

== Seeds ==
The first eight seeds received a bye to the second round.

1. (Sweden) Mats Wilander (quarterfinals)
2. (United States) Andre Agassi (quarterfinals)
3. (United States) Brad Gilbert (third round)
4. (Argentina) Guillermo Pérez Roldán (third round)
5. (United States) Aaron Krickstein (quarterfinals)
6. (United States) Jay Berger (second round)
7. (Brazil) Luiz Mattar (second round)
8. (Austria) Thomas Muster (champion)
9. (Peru) Jaime Yzaga (second round)
10. (Chile) Pedro Rebolledo (first round)
11. (Socialist Federal Republic of Yugoslavia) Bruno Orešar (semifinals)
12. (United States) Richey Reneberg (third round)
13. (United States) Lawson Duncan (final)
14. (Peru) Pablo Arraya (first round)
15. (Spain) Fernando Luna (third round)
16. (United States) Todd Witsken (third round)

== Draw ==
Key

- Q = Qualifier
- WC = Wild card
- LL = Lucky loser
- Alt = Alternate
- ITF = ITF entry
- PR = Protected ranking
- SR = Special ranking
- SE = Special exempt
- JE = Junior exempt
- JR = Junior Accelerator Programme entrant
- CO = College Accelerator Programme entrant
- NG = Next Gen Accelerator Program entrant
- w/o = Walkover
- r = Retired
- d = Defaulted

=== Finals ===
Quarterfinals
1	(Sweden) Mats Wilander	6	1
(Argentina) Horacio de la Peña	7	6
13	(United States) Lawson Duncan	7	6
5	(United States) Aaron Krickstein	5	2
11	(Socialist Federal Republic of Yugoslavia) Bruno Orešar	6	6
(United States) Michael Kures	3	3
8	(Austria) Thomas Muster	6	6
2	(United States) Andre Agassi	1	4

Semifinals
(Argentina) Horacio de la Peña	4	2
13	(United States) Lawson Duncan	6	6
11	(Socialist Federal Republic of Yugoslavia) Bruno Orešar	5	0
8	(Austria) Thomas Muster	7	6

Final
13	(United States) Lawson Duncan	2	2
8	(Austria) Thomas Muster	6	6

=== Top half ===
==== Section 1 ====
First round
WC	(South Africa) A Burrow	6	6
Q	(United States) J Tarango	1	1
WC	(United States) P Palandjian	6	6
(Nigeria) T Mmoh	4	2
Q	(United States) D Goldberg	2	0
16	(United States) T Witsken	6	6
10	(Chile) P Rebolledo	3	4
(United States) M Dickson	6	6
(United States) J Brown	6	6
(United States) J Levine	1	1
(Argentina) H de la Peña	6	6
(France) L Courteau	1	2

Second round
1	(Sweden) M Wilander	6	6
WC	(South Africa) A Burrow	1	2
WC	(United States) P Palandjian	6	2
16	(United States) T Witsken	7	6
(United States) M Dickson	6	6
(United States) J Brown	4	1
(Argentina) H de la Peña	6	6
7	(Brazil) L Mattar	4	3

Third round
1	(Sweden) M Wilander	6	6
16	(United States) T Witsken	3	2
(United States) M Dickson	5	6	3
(Argentina) H de la Peña	7	4	6

Quarterfinals
1	(Sweden) M Wilander	6	1
(Argentina) H de la Peña	7	6

==== Section 2 ====
First round
WC	(Sweden) M Larsson	6	6
WC	(Sweden) J Alvén	4	4
(West Germany) M Westphal	4	6	7
(Sweden) F Waern	6	1	5
(South Africa) B Moir	3	5
13	(United States) L Duncan	6	7
12	(United States) R Reneberg	6	6
Q	(United States) C Boynton	3	1
(United States) L Jensen	7	6
(United States) D Cassidy	6	3
(Uruguay) D Pérez	6	6	6
(United States) J Gurfein	7	2	2

Second round
4	(Argentina) G Pérez Roldán	7	6
WC	(Sweden) M Larsson	6	2
(West Germany) M Westphal	6	4
13	(United States) L Duncan	7	6
12	(United States) R Reneberg	6	6	6
(United States) L Jensen	7	2	2
(Uruguay) D Pérez	7	2	1
5	(United States) A Krickstein	5	6	6

Third round
4	(Argentina) G Pérez Roldán	1	4
13	(United States) L Duncan	6	6
12	(United States) R Reneberg	5	1
5	(United States) A Krickstein	7	6

Quarterfinals
13	(United States) L Duncan	7	6
5	(United States) A Krickstein	5	2

=== Bottom half ===
==== Section 3 ====
First round
(Spain) J Aguilera	6	6
(United States) M Purcell	0	1
(Sweden) U Stenlund	6	6
Q	(United States) J Sobel	3	1
(Spain) J Bardou	1	3
11	(Socialist Federal Republic of Yugoslavia) B Orešar	6	6
14	(Peru) P Arraya	6	6	1
(United States) J Ross	4	7	6
(United States) M Kures	2	6	7
(Argentina) R Argüello	6	4	6
Q	(South Africa) M Kaplan	0	1
(South Africa) M Robertson	6	6

Second round
6	(United States) J Berger	3	1
(Spain) J Aguilera	6	6
(Sweden) U Stenlund	2	1
11	(Socialist Federal Republic of Yugoslavia) B Orešar	6	6
(United States) J Ross	6	3
(United States) M Kures	7	6
(South Africa) M Robertson	3	1
3	(United States) B Gilbert	6	6

Third round
(Spain) J Aguilera	4	4
11	(Socialist Federal Republic of Yugoslavia) B Orešar	6	6
(United States) M Kures	7	4	7
3	(United States) B Gilbert	5	6	6

Quarterfinals
11	(Socialist Federal Republic of Yugoslavia) B Orešar	6	6
(United States) M Kures	3	3

==== Section 4 ====
First round
WC	(United States) P McEnroe	2	1
(United States) J Arias	6	6
(United States) J Courier	6	2	6
Q	(United States) B Farrow	4	6	3
(Argentina) M Ingaramo	2	6
9	(Peru) J Yzaga	6	7
15	(Spain) F Luna	6	6
Q	(United States) A Parker	0	2
(United States) P Johnson	6	1	6
(Czechoslovakia) L Pimek	4	6	3
(West Germany) A Mronz	4	7	6
(Sweden) R Bergh	6	5	4

Second round
8	(Austria) T Muster	6	3	7
(United States) J Arias	4	6	6
(United States) J Courier	6	7
9	(Peru) J Yzaga	1	5
15	(Spain) F Luna	6	6
(United States) P Johnson	2	4
(West Germany) A Mronz	6	4	2
2	(United States) A Agassi	0	6	6

Third round
8	(Austria) T Muster	6	6
(United States) J Courier	2	2
15	(Spain) F Luna	3	3
2	(United States) A Agassi	6	6

Quarterfinals
8	(Austria) T Muster	6	6
2	(United States) A Agassi	1	4
