= 1989 U.S. Pro Tennis Championships – Singles =

Singles
- 1989 U.S. Pro Tennis Championships

Final
- Champion: (Ecuador) Andrés Gómez
- Runner-up: (Sweden) Mats Wilander
- Score: 6–1, 6–4

Details
- Draw: 56 (5WC/7Q/2LL)
- Seeds: 16

Events
Singles	Doubles
← 1988 ·	U.S. Pro Tennis Championships	· 1990 →

Thomas Muster was the defending champion, but could not compete this year due to a car accident suffered in Key Biscayne.

Andrés Gómez won the title by defeating Mats Wilander 6–1, 6–4 in the final. The final was played on 9 August, 24 days after the scheduled final (16 July), due to constant weather delays.

== Seeds ==
The first eight seeds received a bye to the second round.

1. (United States) Andre Agassi (semifinals)
2. (Sweden) Mats Wilander (final)
3. (Argentina) Alberto Mancini (second round)
4. (United States) Jay Berger (quarterfinals)
5. (Argentina) Guillermo Pérez Roldán (third round)
6. (Ecuador) Andrés Gómez (champion)
7. (Peru) Jaime Yzaga (quarterfinals)
8. (Spain) Jordi Arrese (quarterfinals)
9. (Brazil) Luiz Mattar (first round)
10. (United States) Lawson Duncan (third round)
11. (Argentina) Martín Jaite (semifinals)
12. (Socialist Federal Republic of Yugoslavia) Bruno Orešar (first round)
13. (Spain) Fernando Luna (third round)
14. (Argentina) Eduardo Bengoechea (quarterfinals)
15. (United States) Jimmy Arias (third round)
16. (United States) Jimmy Brown (first round)

== Draw ==
=== Key ===
- Q = Qualifier
- WC = Wild card
- LL = Lucky loser
- Alt = Alternate
- ITF = ITF entry
- PR = Protected ranking
- SR = Special ranking
- SE = Special exempt
- JE = Junior exempt
- JR = Junior Accelerator Programme entrant
- CO = College Accelerator Programme entrant
- NG = Next Gen Accelerator Program entrant
- w/o = Walkover
- r = Retired
- d = Defaulted

=== Finals ===
Quarterfinals
1	(United States) Andre Agassi	6	6
7	(Peru) Jaime Yzaga	4	2
4	(United States) Jay Berger	4	4
6	(Ecuador) Andrés Gómez	6	6
11	(Argentina) Martín Jaite	6	4	7
14	(Argentina) Eduardo Bengoechea	3	6	6
8	(Spain) Jordi Arrese	6	4
2	(Sweden) Mats Wilander	7	6

Semifinals
1	(United States) Andre Agassi	6	7	2
6	(Ecuador) Andrés Gómez	7	6	6
11	(Argentina) Martín Jaite	6	4	4
2	(Sweden) Mats Wilander	3	6	6

Final
6	(Ecuador) Andrés Gómez	6	6
2	(Sweden) Mats Wilander	1	4

=== Top half ===
==== Section 1 ====
First round
(New Zealand) S Guy	7	6
WC	(South Africa) A Burrow	5	3
(South Africa) B Moir	7	6
LL	(United States) T Mercer	5	0
Q	(United States) M Barba	4	6	6
16	(United States) J Brown	6	3	4
10	(United States) L Duncan	6	6
WC	(United States) M Brown	1	0
(Australia) R Fromberg	3	6	6
(Puerto Rico) M Nido	6	3	7
(Chile) P Rebolledo	6	7
(West Germany) D Leppen	3	5

Second round
1	(United States) A Agassi	6	6
(New Zealand) S Guy	4	0
(South Africa) B Moir	7	6
Q	(United States) M Barba	6	3
10	(United States) L Duncan	6	6
(Puerto Rico) M Nido	4	4
(Chile) P Rebolledo	1	3
7	(Peru) J Yzaga	6	6

Third round
1	(United States) A Agassi	6	6
(South Africa) B Moir	1	2
10	(United States) L Duncan	4	2
7	(Peru) J Yzaga	6	6

Quarterfinals
1	(United States) A Agassi	6	6
7	(Peru) J Yzaga	4	2

==== Section 2 ====
First round
(United States) N Caswell	4	6	2
(Canada) M Wostenholme	6	3	6
(United States) R Reneberg	6	3	6
(Argentina) G Giussani	2	6	1
(Spain) JC Báguena	2	4
13	(Spain) F Luna	6	6
12	(Socialist Federal Republic of Yugoslavia) B Orešar	4	6	4
(Australia) B Dyke	6	2	6
(Argentina) G Rivas	6	6
(United States) J Ross	4	2
(Uruguay) D Pérez	7	6
(Australia) S Youl	6	1

Second round
4	(United States) J Berger	6	6
(Canada) M Wostenholme	4	1
(United States) R Reneberg	2	4
13	(Spain) F Luna	6	6
(Australia) B Dyke	7	6
(Argentina) G Rivas	5	3
(Uruguay) D Pérez	3	4
6	(Ecuador) A Gómez	6	6

Third round
4	(United States) J Berger	6	6
13	(Spain) F Luna	3	2
(Australia) B Dyke	6	5	6
6	(Ecuador) A Gómez	4	7	7

Quarterfinals
4	(United States) J Berger	4	4
6	(Ecuador) A Gómez	6	6

=== Bottom half ===
==== Section 3 ====
First round
WC	(United States) L Jensen	6	6
(Peru) A Aramburú	4	3
Q	(Mexico) A Moreno	6	6	5
(Jamaica) D Burke	7	4	7
Q	(United States) S DeVries	5	3
11	(Argentina) M Jaite	7	6
14	(Argentina) E Bengoechea	7	6
Q	(United States) J Boytim	6	0
WC	(United States) Will Bull	4	7	2
Q	(United States) J Sobel	6	6	6
LL	(United States) P Johnson	1	6	6
(United States) K Jones	6	3	2

Second round
5	(Argentina) G Pérez Roldán	6	6	7
WC	(United States) L Jensen	4	7	6
(Jamaica) D Burke	3	2
11	(Argentina) M Jaite	6	6
14	(Argentina) E Bengoechea	6	6
Q	(United States) J Sobel	3	2
LL	(United States) P Johnson	7	6
3	(Argentina) A Mancini	6	2

Third round
5	(Argentina) G Pérez Roldán	3	3
11	(Argentina) M Jaite	6	6
14	(Argentina) E Bengoechea	6	6
LL	(United States) P Johnson	4	4

Quarterfinals
11	(Argentina) M Jaite	6	4	7
14	(Argentina) E Bengoechea	3	6	6

==== Section 4 ====
First round
Q	(United States) B Pearce	6	6
(United States) M Allen	1	2
WC	(United States) C Garner	4	6	5
Q	(South Africa) M Kaplan	6	1	7
(West Germany) K Braasch	6	7
9	(Brazil) L Mattar	2	6
15	(United States) J Arias	6	6
(Peru) P Arraya	4	1
(Spain) J Aguilera	2	7	6
(Argentina) R Argüello	6	5	0
(South Africa) M Robertson	7	6
(Argentina) M Ingaramo	6	2

Second round
8	(Spain) J Arrese	6	3	7
Q	(United States) B Pearce	2	6	6
Q	(South Africa) M Kaplan	2	2
(West Germany) K Braasch	6	6
15	(United States) J Arias	3	7	6
(Spain) J Aguilera	6	6	0
(South Africa) M Robertson	3	2
2	(Sweden) M Wilander	6	6

Third round
8	(Spain) J Arrese	6	7
(West Germany) K Braasch	3	6
15	(United States) J Arias	6	5	4
2	(Sweden) M Wilander	3	7	6

Quarterfinals
8	(Spain) J Arrese	6	4
2	(Sweden) M Wilander	7	6
