= 1989 Davis Cup Asia/Oceania Zone =

International tennis competition

The Asia/Oceania Zone was one of the three zones of the regional Davis Cup competition in 1989.

In the Asia/Oceania Zone there were two different tiers, called groups, in which teams competed against each other to advance to the upper tier.

== Group I ==
Winners in Group I advanced to the World Group qualifying round, along with losing teams from the World Group first round. The winner of the preliminary round joined the remaining teams in the main draw first round, while the losing team was relegated to the Asia/Oceania Zone Group II in 1990.

=== Participating nations ===
- China
- India
- Japan
- Hong Kong
- New Zealand
- Philippines
- South Korea

==== Draw ====
Preliminary Round; 3–5 February
Manila, Philippines (hard)
Philippines	5
Hong Kong	0

- Hong Kong relegated to Group II in 1990.

First Round; 7–9 April
New Zealand
bye
Manila, Philippines (hard)
Philippines	4
China	1
Hasaki, Japan (hard)
Japan	2
South Korea	3
bye
India

Second Round; 5–7 May
Manila, Philippines (indoor clay)
New Zealand	4
Philippines	1
Bharuch, India (grass)
South Korea	4
India	1

- New Zealand and South Korea advance to World Group qualifying round.

=== Preliminary round ===
==== Philippines vs. Hong Kong ====
Philippines
5
Rizal Memorial Sports Complex, Manila, Philippines
3–5 February 1989
Hard

Hong Kong
0

			1	2	3	4	5
1	(Philippines) (Hong Kong)	Mehl Ampon; Mark Bailey	6; 3	6; 3	6; 3
2	(Philippines) (Hong Kong)	Felix Barrientos; Colin Grant	6; 2	6; 2	6; 2
3	(Philippines) (Hong Kong)	Felix Barrientos / Raymundo Suarez; Colin Grant / Pang Lui	4; 6	6; 3	6; 2	6; 4
4	(Philippines) (Hong Kong)	Felix Barrientos; Mark Bailey	6; 4	6; 4
5	(Philippines) (Hong Kong)	Mehl Ampon; Colin Grant	6; 0	7; 5

=== First round ===
==== Philippines vs. China ====
Philippines
4
Rizal Memorial Sports Complex, Manila, Philippines
7–9 April 1989
Hard

China
1

			1	2	3	4	5
1	(Philippines) (China)	Miguel Dungo; Zhang Jiuhua	4; 6	3; 6	6; 4	4; 6
2	(Philippines) (China)	Felix Barrientos; Xia Jiaping	6; 4	6; 2	6; 2
3	(Philippines) (China)	Felix Barrientos / Rodrigo Rafael; Li Depeng / Liu Shuhua	6; 1	3; 6	6; 3	6; 4
4	(Philippines) (China)	Felix Barrientos; Zhang Jiuhua	6; 3	6; 3	6; 4
5	(Philippines) (China)	Miguel Dungo; Xia Jiaping	6; 4	6; 3

==== Japan vs. South Korea ====
Japan
2
Tennis Port, Hasaki, Japan
7–9 April 1989
Hard

South Korea
3

			1	2	3	4	5
1	(Japan) (South Korea)	Toshihisa Tsuchihashi; Song Dong-wook	6; 4	6; 4	6; 4
2	(Japan) (South Korea)	Haruo Nakano; Kim Bong-soo	2; 6	6^{9} 7^{11}	0; 6
3	(Japan) (South Korea)	Haruo Nakano / Shigeru Ota; Kim Bong-soo / Yoo Jin-sun	7^{7} 6^{4}	6; 3	4; 6	6; 3
4	(Japan) (South Korea)	Toshihisa Tsuchihashi; Kim Bong-soo	1; 6	6; 2	1; 6	0; 6
5	(Japan) (South Korea)	Haruo Nakano; Song Dong-wook	3; 6	4; 6	2; 6

=== Second round ===
==== Philippines vs. New Zealand ====
Philippines
1
Rizal Memorial Sports Complex, Manila, Philippines
5–7 May 1989
Clay (indoors)

New Zealand
4

			1	2	3	4	5
1	(Philippines) (New Zealand)	Miguel Dungo; Steve Guy	3; 6	6^{3} 7^{7}	3; 6
2	(Philippines) (New Zealand)	Felix Barrientos; Kelly Evernden	4; 6	2; 6	6; 2	2; 6
3	(Philippines) (New Zealand)	Felix Barrientos / Rodrigo Rafael; Kelly Evernden / David Lewis	6; 3	3; 6	4; 6	6^{5} 7^{7}
4	(Philippines) (New Zealand)	Miguel Dungo; Kelly Evernden	3; 6	7; 5	1; 6
5	(Philippines) (New Zealand)	Felix Barrientos; Steve Guy	6^{2} 7^{7}	6; 3	6; 2

==== India vs. South Korea ====
India
1
Gujarat Narmada Valley Co., Bharuch, India
5–7 May 1989
Grass

South Korea
4

			1	2	3	4	5
1	(India) (South Korea)	Zeeshan Ali; Kim Bong-soo	4; 6	7^{7} 6^{1}	2; 6	6^{6} 7^{8}
2	(India) (South Korea)	Srinivasan Vasudevan; Yoo Jin-sun	3; 6	6; 3	6^{1} 7^{7}	4; 6
3	(India) (South Korea)	Zeeshan Ali / Mark Ferreira; Kim Bong-soo / Yoo Jin-sun	3; 6	6^{3} 7^{7}	7; 5	3; 6
4	(India) (South Korea)	Zeeshan Ali; Yoo Jin-sun	3; 6	3; 6
5	(India) (South Korea)	Srinivasan Vasudevan; Kim Bong-soo	6; 4	6; 1

== Group II ==
The winner in Group II advanced to the Asia/Oceania Zone Group I in 1990.

=== Participating nations ===
- Bahrain
- Bangladesh
- Chinese Taipei
- Iraq
- Jordan
- Kuwait
- Malaysia
- Pakistan
- Singapore
- Sri Lanka
- Syria
- Thailand

==== Draw ====
First Round; 3–5 February
Thailand
bye
Manama, Bahrain (hard)
Bahrain	4
Syria	1
Chinese Taipei
bye
Colombo, Sri Lanka (clay)
Sri Lanka	3
Malaysia	2
Baghdad, Iraq (hard)
Iraq	2
Bangladesh	3
bye
Singapore
Amman, Jordan
Kuwait	3
Jordan	2
bye
Pakistan

Second Round; 7–9 April
Bangkok, Thailand (hard)
Thailand	5
Bahrain	0
Colombo, Sri Lanka (clay)
Chinese Taipei	2
Sri Lanka	3
Dhaka, Bangladesh (hard)
Bangladesh	4
Singapore	1
Kuwait City, Kuwait (hard)
Kuwait	0
Pakistan	5

Third Round; 16–18 June
Bangkok, Thailand (hard)
Thailand	5
Sri Lanka	0
Islamabad, Pakistan (clay)
Bangladesh	0
Pakistan	5

Third Round; 21–24 July
Rawalpindi, Pakistan (clay)
Thailand	1
Pakistan	3

- Pakistan promoted to Group I in 1990.

=== First round ===
==== Bahrain vs. Syria ====
Bahrain
4
Isa Town Tennis Stadium, Manama, Bahrain
3–5 February 1989
Hard

Syria
1

			1	2	3	4	5
1	(Bahrain) (Syria)	Abdul-Rahman Shehab; Dawood Dawoodian	6; 3	3; 6	1; 6	4; 6
2	(Bahrain) (Syria)	Esam Abdulaal; Samer Mourad	7^{7} 6^{1}	6; 2	6; 2
3	(Bahrain) (Syria)	Esam Abdulaal / Abdul-Rahman Shehab; Mounged Bouhassoun / Dawood Dawoodian	6; 3	6; 0	6; 3
4	(Bahrain) (Syria)	Esam Abdulaal; Dawood Dawoodian	6; 3	6; 0	5; 7	5; 7	6; 4
5	(Bahrain) (Syria)	Abdul-Rahman Shehab; Samer Mourad	6; 4	6; 4

==== Sri Lanka vs. Malaysia ====
Sri Lanka
3
Sri Lanka Tennis Association, Colombo, Sri Lanka
3–5 February 1989
Clay

Malaysia
2

			1	2	3	4	5
1	(Sri Lanka) (Malaysia)	Umesha Wallooppillai; Selvam Veerasingam	7^{7} 6^{4}	6; 4	7; 5
2	(Sri Lanka) (Malaysia)	Arjun Fernando; Rudy Foo	6; 1	6; 1	6; 2
3	(Sri Lanka) (Malaysia)	Arjun Fernando / Sujit Fernando; Chow Chin-chuan / Rudy Foo	3; 6	4; 6	4; 6
4	(Sri Lanka) (Malaysia)	Umesha Wallooppillai; Rudy Foo	6; 1	6; 1	6; 1
5	(Sri Lanka) (Malaysia)	Jayendra Wijeyesekera; Selvam Veerasingam	1; 6	6; 2	0; 6	1; 6

==== Iraq vs. Bangladesh ====
Iraq
2
Min. of Ind. Sports Club, Baghdad, Iraq
3–5 February 1989
Hard

Bangladesh
3

			1	2	3	4	5
1	(Iraq) (Bangladesh)	Ali Kadhim; Mahtabur Rahman	6; 0	7^{7} 6^{3}	6; 1
2	(Iraq) (Bangladesh)	Kadhim Kadhim; Shovon Jamaly	3; 6	5; 7	6; 2	2; 6
3	(Iraq) (Bangladesh)	Ali Kadhim / Kadhim Kadhim; Shovon Jamaly / Faisal Rahman	4; 6	6^{1} 7^{7}	5; 7
4	(Iraq) (Bangladesh)	Kadhim Kadhim; Mahtabur Rahman	5; 7	2; 6	6; 0	6; 3	6; 2
5	(Iraq) (Bangladesh)	Ali Kadhim; Shovon Jamaly	2; 6	0; 6	4; 6

==== Jordan vs. Kuwait ====
Jordan
2
King Hussein Sports Palace, Amman, Jordan
3–5 February 1989
Hard (indoors)

Kuwait
3

			1	2	3	4	5
1	(Jordan) (Kuwait)	Eyad Shahadeh; Khaled Ashkanani	2; 6	5; 7	1; 6
2	(Jordan) (Kuwait)	Hani Al Ali; Khaled Al Foudari	6; 4	6; 2	7^{7} 6^{2}
3	(Jordan) (Kuwait)	Hani Al Ali / Abdullah Al Khalil; Aymen-Ibrahim Al-Ashwak / Khaled Ashkanani	6; 2	6^{6} 7^{8}	5; 7	6^{3} 7^{7}
4	(Jordan) (Kuwait)	Hani Al Ali; Aymen-Ibrahim Al-Ashwak	6; 1	6; 3	6; 0
5	(Jordan) (Kuwait)	Abdullah Al Khalil; Khaled Al Foudari	4; 6	2; 6	0; 6

=== Second round ===
==== Thailand vs. Bahrain ====
Thailand
5
National Tennis Centre, Bangkok, Thailand
7–9 April 1989
Hard

Bahrain
0

			1	2	3	4	5
1	(Thailand) (Bahrain)	Woraphol Thongkhamchu; Esam Abdulaal	6; 3	6; 1	6; 0
2	(Thailand) (Bahrain)	Tanakorn Srichaphan; Abdul-Rahman Shehab	6; 1	6; 1	6; 0
3	(Thailand) (Bahrain)	Panomkorn Pladchurnil / Vittaya Samrej; Esam Abdulaal / Abdul-Rahman Shehab	6; 1	6; 3	6; 2
4	(Thailand) (Bahrain)	Woraphol Thongkhamchu; Abdul-Rahman Shehab	6; 0	6; 3
5	(Thailand) (Bahrain)	Tanakorn Srichaphan; Esam Abdulaal	6; 2	6; 1

==== Sri Lanka vs. Chinese Taipei ====
Sri Lanka
3
Sri Lanka Tennis Association, Colombo, Sri Lanka
7–9 April 1989
Clay

Chinese Taipei
2

			1	2	3	4	5
1	(Sri Lanka) (Chinese Taipei)	Arjun Fernando; Hsu Huang-jung	7^{7} 6^{1}	6; 1	6; 4
2	(Sri Lanka) (Chinese Taipei)	Umesha Wallooppillai; Wu Chang-rung	6; 3	6; 0	6; 4
3	(Sri Lanka) (Chinese Taipei)	Arjun Fernando / Umesha Wallooppillai; Hsu Huang-jung / Wu Chang-rung	0; 6	4; 6	3; 6
4	(Sri Lanka) (Chinese Taipei)	Umesha Wallooppillai; Hsu Huang-jung	4; 6	1; 6	3; 6
5	(Sri Lanka) (Chinese Taipei)	Arjun Fernando; Wu Chang-rung	2; 6	7; 5	6; 3	2; 6	6; 4

==== Bangladesh vs. Singapore ====
Bangladesh
4
National Tennis Complex, Dhaka, Bangladesh
7–9 April 1989
Hard

Singapore
1

			1	2	3	4	5
1	(Bangladesh) (Singapore)	Shovon Jamaly; Sunny Liu	6^{5} 7^{7}	4; 6	7; 5	6; 3	6; 2
2	(Bangladesh) (Singapore)	Faisal Rahman; Liu Wai-yaw	3; 6	6; 4	1; 0			retired
3	(Bangladesh) (Singapore)	Shovon Jamaly / Faisal Rahman; Sunny Liu / Melvin Pereira	7; 5	6; 4	6; 4
4	(Bangladesh) (Singapore)	Harunur-Rashid Bhuiyan; Sunny Liu	3; 6	3; 6	6^{3} 7^{7}
5	(Bangladesh) (Singapore)	Mahtabur Rahman; Wong Chee-leong	6; 4	6; 3	6; 2

==== Kuwait vs. Pakistan ====
Kuwait
0
National Tennis Centre, Kuwait City, Kuwait
7–9 April 1989
Hard

Pakistan
5

			1	2	3	4	5
1	(Kuwait) (Pakistan)	Khaled Al Foudari; Hamed-ul-Haq	2; 6	4; 6	1; 6
2	(Kuwait) (Pakistan)	Aymen-Ibrahim Al-Ashwak; Rashid Malik	1; 6	1; 6	2; 6
3	(Kuwait) (Pakistan)	Aymen-Ibrahim Al-Ashwak / Khaled Ashkanani; Rashid Malik / Hamed-ul-Haq	3; 6	0; 6	1; 6
4	(Kuwait) (Pakistan)	Aymen-Ibrahim Al-Ashwak; Hamed-ul-Haq	2; 6	1; 6
5	(Kuwait) (Pakistan)	Khaled Al Foudari; Rashid Malik	2; 6	1; 6

=== Third round ===
==== Thailand vs. Sri Lanka ====
Thailand
5
National Tennis Centre, Bangkok, Thailand
16–18 June 1989
Hard

Sri Lanka
0

			1	2	3	4	5
1	(Thailand) (Sri Lanka)	Tanakorn Srichaphan; Neil Rajapakse	6; 2	6; 1	6; 1
2	(Thailand) (Sri Lanka)	Woraphol Thongkhamchu; Arjun Fernando	6; 1	6; 4	6; 4
3	(Thailand) (Sri Lanka)	Panomkorn Pladchurnil / Vittaya Samrej; Arjun Fernando / Neil Rajapakse	6; 1	7^{7} 6^{4}	6; 2
4	(Thailand) (Sri Lanka)	Tanakorn Srichaphan; Arjun Fernando	5; 7	6; 4	6; 2
5	(Thailand) (Sri Lanka)	Woraphol Thongkhamchu; Jayendra Wijeyesekera	6; 2	6; 4

==== Pakistan vs. Bangladesh ====
Pakistan
5
Islamabad Tennis Club, Islamabad, Pakistan
16–18 June 1989
Clay

Bangladesh
0

			1	2	3	4	5
1	(Pakistan) (Bangladesh)	Mushaf Zia; Shovon Jamaly	6; 4	6; 2	6; 0
2	(Pakistan) (Bangladesh)	Hamed-ul-Haq; Faisal Rahman	6; 0	6; 0	6; 0
3	(Pakistan) (Bangladesh)	Hamed-ul-Haq / Mushaf Zia; Shovon Jamaly / Faisal Rahman	6; 2	6; 1	6; 1
4	(Pakistan) (Bangladesh)	Usman Rahim; Faisal Rahman	6; 0	6; 4	6; 1
5	(Pakistan) (Bangladesh)	Hamed-ul-Haq; Shovon Jamaly	6; 1	6; 1	6; 1

=== Fourth round ===
==== Pakistan vs. Thailand ====
Pakistan
3
Rawalpindi Tennis Club, Rawalpindi, Pakistan
21–24 July 1989
Clay

Thailand
1

			1	2	3	4	5
1	(Pakistan) (Thailand)	Mushaf Zia; Woraphol Thongkhamchu	6; 3	6; 2	7^{7} 6^{4}
2	(Pakistan) (Thailand)	Hamed-ul-Haq; Tanakorn Srichaphan	6; 3	6^{3} 7^{7}	4; 6	6; 1	6; 2
3	(Pakistan) (Thailand)	Rashid Malik / Islam-ul-Haq; Panomkorn Pladchurnil / Vittaya Samrej	4; 6	7^{9} 6^{7}	6^{5} 7^{7}	7; 5	2; 6
4	(Pakistan) (Thailand)	Mushaf Zia; Tanakorn Srichaphan	6; 3	6; 4	6^{2} 7^{7}	6^{2} 7^{7}	11; 9
5	(Pakistan) (Thailand)	Hamed-ul-Haq; Woraphol Thongkhamchu						not played
