= Geoff Roper =

Canadian tennis player

- Country (sports): Canada
- Born: 3 June 1964 (age 60); Belgium
- Height: 6 ft 0 in (183 cm)

Singles
- Career record: 0–1
- Highest ranking: No. 437 (15 Feb 1988)

Grand Slam singles results
- Wimbledon: Q1 (1988)

Doubles
- Highest ranking: No. 305 (15 Feb 1988)

Grand Slam doubles results
- Wimbledon: Q1 (1987, 1988)

Geoff Roper (born 3 June 1964) is a Canadian former professional tennis player.

Roper was a collegiate tennis player for Florida State University and competed on the professional tour in the 1980s, reaching a best singles ranking of 437. He featured in the qualifying draw for the 1988 Wimbledon Championships and made the main draw of the 1988 Volvo International in Stratton Mountain.

== ATP Challenger finals ==
=== Doubles: 1 (0–1) ===
Result	Date	Tournament	Surface	Partner	Opponents	Score
Loss	Dec 1987	East London, South Africa	Hard	(Switzerland) Stephan Medem	(United States) Luke Jensen (South Africa) Byron Talbot	3–6, 7–5, 4–6
