= List of India Davis Cup team representatives =

This is a list of tennis players who have represented the India Davis Cup team in an official Davis Cup match. India have taken part in the competition since 1921.

== Players ==
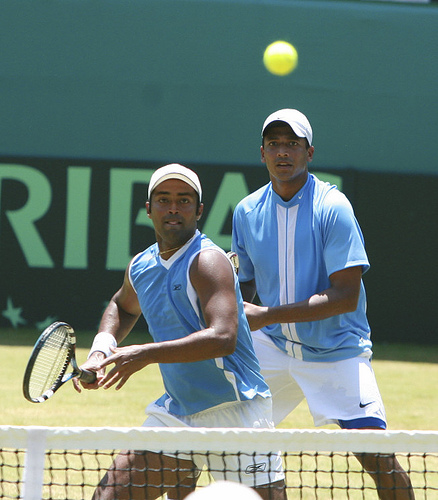
Mahesh Bhupathi and Leander Paes

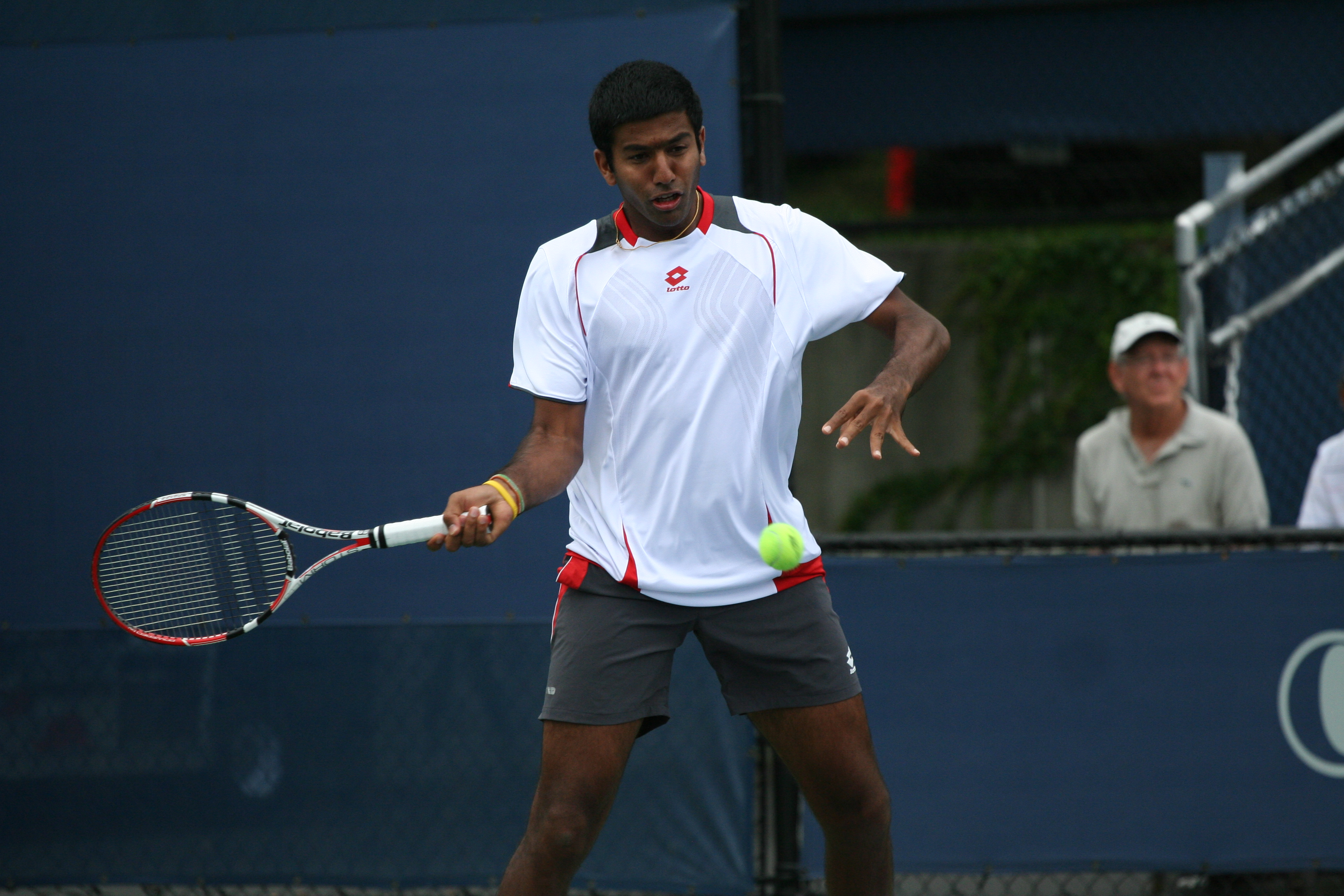
Rohan Bopanna

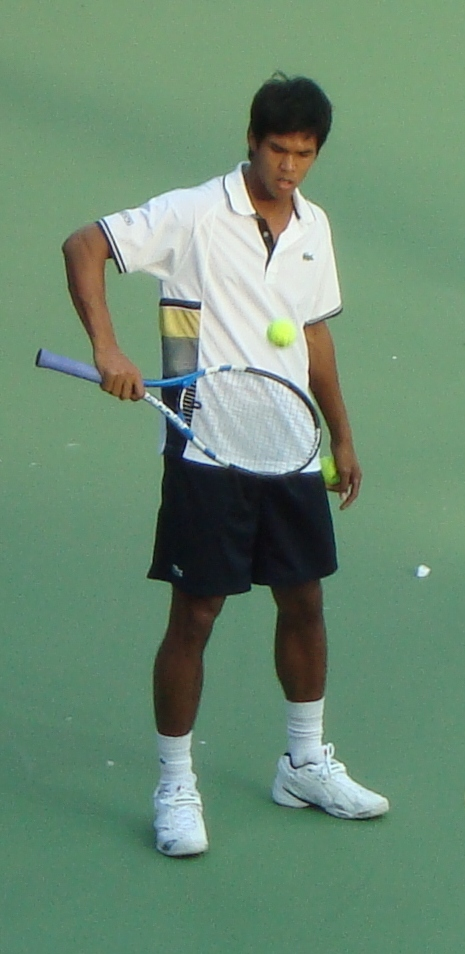
Somdev Devvarman

Player	W-L (Total)	W-L (Singles)	W-L (Doubles)	Ties	Debut
Zeeshan Ali	3–10	1–8	2–2	7	1989
Akhtar Ali	9–2	5–2	4–0	8	1958
Anand Amritraj	32–31	11–17	21–14	39	1968
Vijay Amritraj	45–28	27–18	18–10	32	1970
Prakash Amritraj	7–11	7–11	0–0	10	2003
Eric Andrea	2–1	2–1	0–0	2	1925
Nandan Bal	3–1	2–1	1–0	2	1980
Yuki Bhambri	2–1	2–1	0–0	2	2009
Man-Mohan Bhandari	0–3	0–2	0–1	1	1934
Mahesh Bhupathi	35–20	8–14	27–6	35	1995
E.V. Bobb	1–4	1–3	0–1	2	1928
Sandford Bobb	0–1	0–0	0–1	1	1926
Rohan Bopanna	12–21	9–17	3–4	17	2002
Dilip Bose	1–2	1–2	0–0	2	1947
A.E. Browne	0–1	0–0	0–1	1	1934
Janmeja Charanjiva	2–6	1–4	1–2	3	1930
Lewis Deane	3–1	1–0	2–1	3	1921
Somdev Devvarman	6–9	6–8	0–1	8	2008
Mark Ferreira	0–1	0–0	0–1	1	1989
Hassan Ali Fyzee	10–18	4–13	6–5	11	1921
Athar-Ali Fyzee	4–3	3–3	1–0	4	1921
Syed Mohammed Hadi	0–4	0–0	0–4	4	1924
Sydney Jacob	7–4	7–3	0–1	6	1921
Ramesh Krishnan	29–21	23–19	6–2	24	1978
Ramanathan Krishnan	69–28	50–19	19–9	43	1953
Harishanker Krishnan	0–2	0–2	0–0	1	1980
Naresh Kumar	26–20	14–15	12–5	17	1952
Jagat-Mohan Lal	1–3	0–2	1–1	3	1925
Premjit Lall	58–32	34–20	24–12	41	1959
Harsh Mankad	6–10	6–10	0–0	10	2000
Jimmy Mehta	0–1	0–0	0–1	1	1947
Sashi Menon	18–16	13–13	5–3	19	1970
Shyam Minotra	1–1	1–1	0–0	1	1968
Gaurav Misra	6–2	4–1	2–1	5	1968
Sumant Misra	2–10	2–6	0–4	4	1947
Shiv-Prakash Misra	18–1	13–1	5–0	11	1964
Ghaus Mohammed Khan	3–4	2–3	1–1	3	1938
Atri-Madan Mohan	0–4	0–4	0–0	2	1930
Jaidip Mukerjea	62–35	39–23	23–12	43	1960
Chiradip Mukerjea	4–0	3–0	1–0	3	1973
Gaurav Natekar	2–3	0–1	2–2	5	1992
Narendra Nath	1–1	0–0	1–1	2	1954
Leander Paes	86–32	48–22	38–10	48	1990
Dudley Pitt	0–1	0–0	0–1	1	1928
Srinath Prahlad	0–4	0–4	0–0	2	1998
Sri-Krishna Prasada	5–4	3–2	2–2	4	1927
Vishal Punna	0–1	0–1	0–0	1	2004
Rohit Rajpal	0–1	0–1	0–0	1	1990
Cotah Ramaswami	2–0	0–0	2–0	2	1922
Karan Rastogi	0–4	0–4	0–0	3	2007
Yaswanath-Rao Savur	1–2	0–2	1–0	1	1939
Subba Sawhney	0–3	0–1	0–2	2	1938
Vivek Shokeen	0–2	0–2	0–0	1	2007
Jasjit Singh	1–2	1–2	0–0	2	1974
Sanam Singh	0–1	0–1	0–0	1	2012
Sunil-Kumar Sipaeya	1–0	0–0	1–0	1	2007
Mohammed Sleem	7–8	7–7	0–1	7	1921
Hira-Lal Soni	2–4	1–2	1–2	3	1928
Fazaluddin Syed	4–7	4–4	0–3	6	1998
A.J. Udaykumar	2–0	2–0	0–0	2	1956
Vishal Uppal	1–1	0–0	1–1	2	2000
Vishnu Vardhan	0–1	0–1	0–0	1	2011
Srinivasan Vasudevan	6–4	6–3	0–1	8	1983
Ravi Venkatesan	5–0	5–0	0–0	5	1965
