= Miguel Dungo =

Miguel Dungo may refer to:

- Miguel Dungo Jr., Filipino tennis player of the 1950s and 1960s
- Miguel Dungo III, Filipino tennis player of the 1980s, son of the above
