= 1989 U.S. Pro Tennis Championships =

- Date: July 10–16
- Edition: 62nd
- Category: Grand Prix
- Draw: 56S / 28D
- Prize money: $297,500
- Surface: Clay / outdoor
- Location: Chestnut Hill, Massachusetts, US
- Venue: Longwood Cricket Club

Champions

Singles
- (Ecuador) Andrés Gómez

Doubles
- (Ecuador) Andrés Gómez / (Argentina) Alberto Mancini
| ← 1988 · | U.S. Pro Tennis Championships | · 1990 → |

The 1989 U.S. Pro Tennis Championships was a men's tennis tournament played on outdoor green clay courts at the Longwood Cricket Club in Chestnut Hill, Massachusetts in the United States. The event was part of the Super Series of the 1989 Nabisco Grand Prix circuit. It was the 62nd edition of the tournament and was held from July 10 through July 16, 1989. Sixth-seeded Andrés Gómez won the singles title, his second at the event after 1986.

== Finals ==
=== Singles ===
(Ecuador) Andrés Gómez defeated (Sweden) Mats Wilander 6–1, 6–4

- It was Gómez' 1st singles title of the year and the 16th of his career.

=== Doubles ===
(Ecuador) Andrés Gómez / (Argentina) Alberto Mancini defeated (United States) Todd Nelson / (United States) Phil Williamson 7–6, 6–2
