= Tim Siegel =

Tim Siegel may refer to:

- Tim Siegel (One Life to Live), character in American soap opera One Life to Live
- Tim Siegel (tennis) (born 1964), tennis player and coach
