= Bagel (tennis) =

Tennis term

In tennis, a bagel is when the set ends with a score of 6–0. An extremely rare type of bagel, where no point is lost, is called a golden set. Most bagel sets occur in the early rounds of tennis tournaments where the favorites play lower-ranked players, such as lucky losers or wild cards.

== Etymology ==
The term refers to the similarity between the shape of a zero and the shape of a bagel. The tennis term was coined by players Harold Solomon and Eddie Dibbs, and popularized by commentator Bud Collins.

== Surface disparity ==
Statistics of the men's singles Grand Slam tournaments from 2000 to 2016 are as follows: at Wimbledon (grass), 127 bagels were made; at French Open (clay), 267; at the US Open Tennis Championship (hardcourt), 275, and at the Australian Open (hardcourt), 238.. Björn Borg (five-time Wimbledon champion and six-time French Open champion) recorded twenty 6–0 sets at the French Open, and only five at Wimbledon.

== Double bagel ==
=== Women's singles ===
For women in Grand Slam tournaments, a double bagel result is possible as the matches are best of three sets. In the Open Era, there has been a women's singles Grand Slam tournament match with a double bagel every year except for in 1968 and 2005. The most double bagels were in the seasons of 1974 and 1993, when eight matches had a result of 6–0, 6–0.

The following players had at least five double-bagels in Grand Slam singles events:

#	Player
14	(France) Suzanne Lenglen
14	(Australia) Margaret Court
13	(United States) Chris Evert
10	(United States) Helen Wills-Moody
7	(Germany) Steffi Graf
7	(United States) Serena Williams
7	(Australia) Ashleigh Barty
6	(Belgium) Kim Clijsters
6	(France) Mary Pierce
6	(Russia) Maria Sharapova
5	(Socialist Federal Republic of Yugoslavia) Monica Seles
5	(Spain) Conchita Martínez
5	(Romania) Simona Halep
5	(Poland) Agnieszka Radwanska
5	(Belarus) Viktoria Azarenka

=== Between No. 1 ranked players ===
==== Men ====
Winner	Opponent	Event
(Czechoslovakia) Ivan Lendl	(United States) Jimmy Connors	1984 Forrest Hills

==== Women ====
Winner	Opponent	Event
(United States) Chris Evert	(United States) Martina Navratilova	1981 Amelia Island
(United States) Chris Evert	(United States) Tracy Austin	1982 East Rutherford
(Germany) Steffi Graf	(United States) Tracy Austin	1994 Indian Wells
(Switzerland) Martina Hingis	(Socialist Federal Republic of Yugoslavia) Monica Seles	2000 Miami Open
(United States) Lindsay Davenport	(Russia) Maria Sharapova	2005 Indian Wells
(Belgium) Kim Clijsters	(Russia) Dinara Safina	2011 Australian Open
(Poland) Iga Świątek	(Czech Republic) Karolína Plíšková	2021 Rome

== Triple bagel ==
Key
W	F	SF	QF	#R	RR	Q#	P#	DNQ	A	Z#	PO	G	S	B	NMS	NTI	P	NH

(W) winner; (F) finalist; (SF) semifinalist; (QF) quarterfinalist; (#R) rounds 4, 3, 2, 1; (RR) round-robin stage; (Q#) qualification round; (P#) preliminary round; (DNQ) did not qualify; (A) absent; (Z#) Davis/Fed Cup Zonal Group (with number indication) or (PO) play-off; (G) gold, (S) silver or (B) bronze Olympic/Paralympic medal; (NMS) not a Masters tournament; (NTI) not a Tier I tournament; (P) postponed; (NH) not held; (SR) strike rate (events won / competed); (W–L) win–loss record.
- = also won the tournament.

There have been at least 18 best-of-five-set matches which have lasted 18 games (6–0, 6–0, 6–0), colloquially referred to as a "triple bagel", in the Open Era. This is the shortest possible length for a best-of-five-set match, not including retirements or defaults.

Year	Event	Round	Winner	Loser
1968	French Open	1R	(Socialist Federal Republic of Yugoslavia) Nikola Špear	(France) Daniel Contet
1973	Davis Cup	Z1	(Indonesia) Gondo Widjojo	(Hong Kong) Tao Po
1981	Davis Cup	PO	(France) Thierry Tulasne	(Japan) Shinichi Sakamoto
1984	Davis Cup	1R	(Spain) Emilio Sánchez	(Algeria) Kamel Harrad
1987	French Open	2R	(Czechoslovakia) Karel Nováček	(Argentina) Eduardo Bengoechea
1987	Wimbledon	1R	(Sweden) Stefan Edberg	(Sweden) Stefan Eriksson
1987	US Open	1R	(Czechoslovakia) Ivan Lendl^{‡}	(South Africa) Barry Moir
1989	Davis Cup	3R	(Pakistan) Hamed-ul-Haq	(Bangladesh) Faisal Rahman
1991	Davis Cup	1R	(Hong Kong) Michael Walker	(Singapore) Dishan Herath
1993	French Open	2R	(Spain) Sergi Bruguera^{‡}	(France) Thierry Champion
1998	Davis Cup	2R	(Japan) Gouichi Motomura	(New Zealand) Teo Susnjak
1999	Davis Cup	PO	(Chinese Taipei) Lin Bing-Chao	(Qatar) Nasser Al-Khelaifi
2001	Wimbledon	Q3	(Australia) Todd Woodbridge	(Sweden) Johan Örtegren
2005	Davis Cup	2R	(Brazil) Ricardo Mello	(Netherlands Antilles) David Josepa
2009	Davis Cup	PO	(Portugal) Rui Machado	(Algeria) Valentin Rahine
2011	Davis Cup	2R	(United Kingdom) Andy Murray	(Luxembourg) Laurent Bram
2016	Davis Cup†	1R	(Finland) Jarkko Nieminen	(Zimbabwe) Courtney John Lock
2016	Davis Cup†	1R	(Ecuador) Emilio Gómez	(Barbados) Adam Hornby

== Records ==
=== Grand Slam tournaments ===
==== Men's singles ====
In the history of major tournaments, the largest number of 6–0 sets won in men's singles is the following:

#	Player
51	(Serbia) Novak Djokovic
50	(United States) Andre Agassi
47	(Australia) Roy Emerson
46	(Switzerland) Roger Federer
44	(United States) Jimmy Connors
44	(Spain) Rafael Nadal
42	(Czechoslovakia) Ivan Lendl
41	(Australia) John Bromwich
40	(United States) Bill Tilden
35	(Sweden) Björn Borg

At individual majors the players with the most 6–0 sets are:

- Australian Championship: 1. R. Federer – 17; 2. Jack Crawford (Australia) – 16; 3. A. Agassi; N. Djokovic – 15
- French Open: 1. R. Nadal – 24; 2–3. B. Borg, G. Vilas – 20 each; 4–5. Jaroslav Drobný (Czechoslovakia / Egypt), R. Lacoste – 17 each.
- Wimbledon: 1. R. Emerson – 15; 2–3. J. Connors, B. Tilden – to 12.
- US Championship: 1. J. Connors – 22; 2–3. I. Lendl, B. Tilden – 20 each.

Australian Neale Fraser won at least one 6–0 set in 16 Grand Slam tournaments in a row: starting with the 1957 Australian Championship and ending with the 1960 US championship.

==== Women's singles ====
In women's singles, the largest number of 6–0 sets won:

#	Player
106	(United States) Chris Evert
89	(Australia) Margaret Court
72	(Czechoslovakia) (United States) Martina Navratilova
71	(Germany) Steffi Graf
64	(United States) Serena Williams
57	(United States) Helen Wills-Moody
54	(Socialist Federal Republic of Yugoslavia) (United States) Monica Seles
49	(Russia) Maria Sharapova
46	(Spain) Arantxa Sánchez Vicario
44	(Argentina) Gabriela Sabatini

In terms of percentage bagels vs games played.

Percentage	Player
16	(United Kingdom) Ann Jones
14.6	(United States) Chris Evert
13.2	(Australia) Margaret Court
10.9	(Germany) Steffi Graf
10.8	(Poland) Iga Świątek

In individual major tournaments, the largest number of 6–0 sets won is:

- Australian Championship: 1. M. Court – 25; 2. M. Sharapova – 16; 3. S. Williams – 14.
- French Open: 1. C. Evert – 26; 2. A. Sanchez – 22; 3. G. Sabatini – 21.
- Wimbledon: 1–2. Suzanne Lenglen (France), C. Evert – to 29; 3. M. Court – 25.
- US Championship: 1. C. Evert – 43; H. Wills-Moody – 31; 3. M. Court – 27.

=== All tournaments ===
==== Men's singles ====
#	Bagels
479	(United States) Bill Tilden
464	(United Kingdom) Josiah Ritchie
280	(New Zealand) Anthony Wilding
266	(United States) Frank Parker
245	(Czechoslovakia) Jaroslav Drobny
224	(Australia) Roy Emerson
216	(Australia) Ken Rosewall
209	(Australia) John Bromwich
197	(United States) Jimmy Connors
186	(United States) Gardnar Mulloy

#	Double Bagels
106	(United States) Bill Tilden
87	(United Kingdom) Josiah Ritchie
51	(New Zealand) Anthony Wilding
42	(Australia) John Bromwich
37	(United States) Frank Parker
32	(Czechoslovakia) Jaroslav Drobny
25	(Australia) George Worthington
24	(United States) Wayne Sabin

#	Triple Bagels
11	(United States) Bill Tilden
5	(Czechoslovakia) Karel Kozeluh
4	(United Kingdom) Arthur Gore
4	(United Kingdom) Josiah Ritchie
4	(New Zealand) Harry Parker
4	(United Kingdom) Gordon Lowe
4	(South Africa) Bob Hewitt

== Trivia ==
- In 1910 in Brussels, Max Decugis beat Tony Wilding 3–6, 0–6, 7–5, 6–0, 6–0. Wilding was leading 6–3, 6–0, 5–0, until Decugis won the last 19 consecutive games.
- In 1948, Don Budge won the first round match against George Hudson 6–0, 6–0, 6–0 at the US Professional Championship, and then against Jerome Adler 6–0, 6–0, 6–1 in the second round.
- In 1969, in the second round of Wimbledon, top seed Rod Laver began with the loss of the first two sets to the unseeded Indian Premjit Lall. However, the match ended in his favor with a score of 3–6, 4–6, 6–3, 6–0, 6–0.
- There are seven known cases in the history of tennis (two of which occurred in the French Open in one tournament), when the winner of the match lost two bagel sets:
  - 1935 U.S. Pro Tennis Championship: Bill Tilden – Karel Koželuh 0–6, 6–1, 6–4, 0–6, 6–4
  - 1938 U.S. National Championships: Gilbert Hunt – Bobby Riggs 6–2, 0–6, 9–7, 0–6, 6–4
  - 1960 Italian Open: Barry MacKay - Luis Ayala 7–5, 7–5, 0–6, 0–6, 6–1
  - 1962 Tasmanian Championship: Rod Laver – Neale Fraser 7–5, 0–6, 0–6, 6–1, 6–2
  - 1969 French Open: Stanley Matthews – Ilie Nastase 6–3, 0–6, 0–6, 6–4, 8–6
  - 1969 French Open: Dennis Ralston – Patricio Rodríguez 6–2, 6–4, 0–6, 0–6, 6–4
  - 1981 US Open: José Luis Clerc – Mel Purcell 6–3, 0–6, 0–6, 6–4, 6–3
- In 1981, in the first round of the US championship Jimmy Connors, who in the mid-1970s almost married Chris Evert, defeated her then-husband John Lloyd with a score of 6–0, 6–0, 6–2.
- Suzanne Lenglen won nine tournaments in which she did not lose a single game in all matches.
- Guillermo Vilas won two matches with a score of 6–0, 6–0 in two consecutive seasons (1980 and 1981).
- Björn Borg won 116 bagel sets during his career.
- Three women's finals in the history of the Grand Slam tournaments have ended with a double-bagel:
  - 1911 (Wimbledon) Dorothea Lambert-Chambers – Dora Boothby 6–0, 6–0
  - 1988 (French Open) Steffi Graf – Natasha Zvereva 6–0, 6–0
  - 2025 (Wimbledon) Iga Świątek – Amanda Anisimova 6–0, 6–0
- In 2016, during the first round of Davis Cup in the Finland vs. Zimbabwe match on 4 March 2016, Jarkko Nieminen of Finland defeated Courtney John Lock of Zimbabwe 6–0, 6–0, 6–0. Also on 4 March 2016, on the other side of the world, in Ecuador, during the Ecuador vs. Barbados match, Emilio Gómez of Ecuador defeated Adam Hornby of Barbados 6–0, 6–0, 6–0.
- Swiss tennis player Martina Hingis achieved her first Olympic bagel in singles in 1996, and the second in doubles twenty years later.
- Spanish tennis player Conchita Martínez scored the first double bagel against a player inside the top ten in Hamburg in 1995 when she defeated Magdalena Maleeva.
- Polish tennis player Iga Świątek scored the first double bagel in a WTA 1000 final, defeating top ten Czech player and former world No. 1, Karolína Plíšková, in Rome.
