= Peter Flintsø =

Danish tennis player

- Country (sports): Denmark
- Born: 29 March 1968 (age 56)

Singles
- Career record: 0–1 (Davis Cup)
- Highest ranking: No. 493 (6 Jun 1988)

Grand Slam singles results
- Wimbledon: Q1 (1988)

Doubles
- Career record: 0–1 (Davis Cup)
- Highest ranking: No. 151 (7 Aug 1989)

Grand Slam doubles results
- Wimbledon: Q1 (1988)

Peter Flintsø (born 29 March 1968) is a Danish former professional tennis player.

Flintsø, who trained out of the Kjøbenhavns Boldklub, won three Danish national championships in doubles.

On the professional tour, Flintsø had best world rankings of 493 in singles and 151 in doubles. He featured in qualifying at the 1988 Wimbledon Championships and reached four doubles finals on the ATP Challenger Tour.

In 1989 he represented the Denmark Davis Cup team in a World Group play-off tie against Italy. He was beaten in the doubles and lost his singles rubber to Omar Camporese.

== ATP Challenger finals ==
=== Doubles: 4 (0–4) ===
Result	No.	Date	Tournament	Surface	Partner	Opponents	Score
Loss	1.	Sep 1988	Budapest, Hungary	Clay	(Denmark) Peter Bastiansen	(Belgium) Denis Langaskens (Argentina) Eduardo Masso	4–6, 5–7
Loss	2.	Oct 1988	Cherbourg, France	Hard	(Denmark) Peter Bastiansen	(Sweden) Jan Apell (Sweden) Peter Nyborg	2–6, 2–6
Loss	3.	Nov 1988	Copenhagen, Denmark	Carpet	(Denmark) Peter Bastiansen	(Israel) Gilad Bloom (Poland) Wojciech Kowalski	6–7, 5–7
Loss	4.	Aug 1989	Kuala Lumpur, Malaysia	Hard	(Denmark) Morten Christensen	(India) Zeeshan Ali (New Zealand) Steve Guy	4–6, 4–6

== See also ==
- List of Denmark Davis Cup team representatives
