= Vishal Punna =

Indian actor and former tennis player

- Country (sports): India; United States (2017)
- Born: 14 January 1984 (age 41); Hyderabad, India
- Retired: 2011 (one match in 2017)
- Plays: Right-handed
- Prize money: $11,074

Singles
- Career record: 0–1 (Davis Cup)
- Highest ranking: No. 786 (20 September 2004)

Doubles
- Career record: 0–0
- Highest ranking: No. 649 (5 February 2007)

Vishal Punna (born 14 January 1984) is an Indian-American former professional tennis player.

Punna was raised in Hyderabad and featured in one Davis Cup tie for India, against New Zealand away in Invercargill in 2007. He was called upon for a live reverse singles, which he lost to Mark Nielsen, before Leander Paes won the tie for India in the fifth rubber.

Following his retirement from tennis, Punna lived in the United States and worked in the IT industry, before quitting to pursue a career in Indian cinema. He was the lead actor in the 2019 Telugu film Sarovaram.

== See also ==
- List of India Davis Cup team representatives
