= Intercontinental Real Estate Corporation =

American financial services company

- Industry: real estate
- Founded: 1959
- Founder: Petros A. Palandjian
- Headquarters: Boston, Massachusetts

Intercontinental Real Estate Corporation is an American asset management firm. Registered as an investment adviser through the SEC, it manages on core, core-plus and value-add investments in commercial and residential properties across the United States. As of 2020, the corporation has handled over US$10 billion of real estate assets of all real property types.

The firm was founded in Boston, Massachusetts in 1959 as a construction firm by Petros A. Palandjian, an Armenian immigrant from Iran. Palandjian's son, Peter Palandjian, is the CEO.

Intercontinental acquired a 26,000-square-foot three-building office complex at Canal Park in Cambridge for $304 million in May 2016. In December 2019, Intercontinental Real Estate Corporation bought its first Seattle-based commercial office asset at the Roosevelt Commons for $157 million, on behalf of one of its controlled funds.

In July 2026, Intercontinental purchased the 125,233-square-foot Lakeland Town Center, a grocery-anchored retail center located approximately 20 miles south of Seattle.
