= Virginia Brown =

American nuclear physicist

Virginia Ruth Brown (March 11, 1934 – February 8, 2016) was an American nuclear physicist known for her contributions on the structure, interaction, reactions, and bremsstrahlung of nucleons and atomic nuclei. She spent most of her career as a researcher at the Lawrence Livermore National Laboratory.

== Life ==
Brown was born on March 11, 1934, in Massachusetts, and earned a bachelor's degree at Northeastern University. She became a graduate student at McGill University, where she completed her Ph.D. in 1964 under the supervision of Bernard Margolis.

After postdoctoral research at Yale University in 1963 and 1964, she became a researcher at the Lawrence Livermore National Laboratory, working there until 1995. While at Livermore, she served as Secretary/Treasurer of the Division of Nuclear Physics from 1986 to 1995.

She was a program officer at the National Science Foundation (NSF) from 1995 to 1998. In 1998 she moved again, from the NSF to the University of Maryland, College Park as a visiting professor; she also became a researcher at the Massachusetts Institute of Technology Laboratory for Nuclear Science, working there with professor June Matthews.

She died of cancer on February 8, 2016.

== Research ==
She conducted pivotal research on proton-proton and neutron-proton brehmsstralung. For many years, hers were the only brehmsstralung calculations to include the important rescattering term, whose inclusion resolved disagreement with experiment in previous brehmsstralung calculations. Her neutron-proton calculation was the first to include the important effect of pion exchange. This 1973 calculation was eventually confirmed by experiment in 2013, demonstrating the importance of pion exchange between the neutron and proton.

== Recognition ==
Brown was named a Fellow of the American Physical Society (APS), after a nomination from the APS Division of Nuclear Physics, in 1982. In 2003, she became the inaugural winner of the division's Distinguished Service Award, "for substantial and extensive contributions to the nuclear physics community ..., and for her role in bringing to fruition the historic first joint meeting of the nuclear physicists of the American and Japanese Physical Societies".
