= Mark Ferreira =

Indian tennis player

- Full name: Mark Ferreira
- Country (sports): India; Hong Kong
- Born: 1 March 1967 (age 59) Bombay, India

Singles
- Highest ranking: No. 527 (22 April 1991)

Doubles
- Career record: 1–3
- Highest ranking: No. 193 (7 November 1988)

Grand Slam doubles results
- Wimbledon: 2R (1988)

Mark Ferreira (born 1 March 1967) is a former professional tennis player from India. He is the son of former Indian billiards player Michael Ferreira.

== Biography ==
Born in Bombay, he did his schooling from St Andrew's High School Bandra. He studied economics at UCLA and played on the collegiate tennis team.

At the 1988 Wimbledon Championships, Ferreira and partner Zeeshan Ali made the main draw as lucky losers and reached the second round.

Ferreira competed in the doubles main draws of Grand Prix tournaments at Seoul and Singapore in 1989.

He represented both India and Hong Kong in Davis Cup competition. In 1989 he featured in a tie for India against South Korea, appearing in the doubles rubber with Zeeshan Ali, which they lost in four sets. Due to his business career he was later based in Hong Kong and in 1997 played two Davis Cup ties for his adopted country, against both Thailand and Saudi Arabia.

== See also ==
- List of India Davis Cup team representatives
