= Tim Siegel (tennis) =

American tennis player and coach

Current position
- Title: Head coach
- Team: Lubbock-Cooper HS (TX)

Biographical details
- Born: January 24, 1964 (age 62); Manhasset, New York, U.S.

Playing career
- 1983–1986: Arkansas

Coaching career (HC unless noted)
- c. 1987–1990: Arkansas (men's) (assistant)
- 1991–1992: SMU (women's)
- 1993–2015: Texas Tech (men's)
- 1997–1999: Texas Tech (women's)
- 2016–present: Lubbock-Cooper HS (TX)

Head coaching record
- Overall: 330–244 (men's college); 53–61 (women's college)

Accomplishments and honors

Awards
- 2× Big 12 Coach of the Year (2005, 2008); Wilson/ITA South Central Region Coach of the Year (2005)

Tim Siegel (born January 24, 1964) is an American former professional tennis player and college tennis coach. He is currently the head coach of the Lubbock-Cooper High School tennis team and previously served as head coach of the SMU Mustangs women's tennis team, Texas Tech Red Raiders men's tennis team and Texas Tech Red Raiders women's tennis team.

== Playing career ==
=== College ===
Siegel played college tennis for the Arkansas Razorbacks from 1983 to 1986. He was named an All-American in 1985 and 1986 and a three-time Southwest Conference (SWC) singles champion. During the 1984 season, Siegel helped lead the Razorbacks to the program's third SWC championship.

=== Professional ===
Following his time playing for the Razorbacks, Siegel went on to play professionally. With teammate Jimmy Arias, he reached a top-100 world ranking in doubles, the quarterfinals at the U.S. Clay Court Championships, and semifinals in Brisbane, Bologna and Florence. Siegel also reached the third round of doubles at the US Open, Australian Open and the second round of Wimbledon.

== Coaching career ==
After graduating in 1986, Siegel served as an assistant tennis coach with his alma mater, the Arkansas Razorbacks. In 1990, Siegel became the head coach of the SMU Mustangs women's tennis team. Siegel also served as an assistant coach for the SMU Mustangs men's tennis team concurrently. After posting a 28–23 record over two seasons with the Mustangs, Siegel was hired for the same position for the Texas Tech Red Raiders men's tennis team for the start of the 1992 season. In addition to his duties as head coach of the men's team at Texas Tech, Siegel also served as head coach of the women's team from 1997 through 1999. Virginia Brown replaced Siegel as the women's head coach after compiling an overall record of 25–39 and a Big 12 Conference record of only 12–21. During the same period, the men's team, still under Siegel's guidance, went 37–39 (10–16). In 2005, Siegel was named the Big 12 Coach of the Year after winning a school record 25 games and finishing second in regular season conference play along with the Oklahoma State Cowboys and Texas A&M Aggies. Siegel received the award in 2008 after a posting the programs' only second 20 win season in Big 12 play. In the summer of 2015, Siegel took the job as the head coach of the Lubbock-Cooper tennis teams.

== Head coaching record ==
=== Women's college ===
| Season | Team | Overall | Conference | Finish | Postseason | ITA^{#} |
|---|---|---|---|---|---|---|
SMU Mustangs (SWC) (1991–1992)
| 1991 | SMU | 17–10 | | | — | — |
| 1992 | SMU | 11–13 | | | — | — |
| SMU | | 28–23 | | | | |
Texas Tech Red Raiders (Big 12) (1997–1999)
| 1997 | Texas Tech | 10–11 | 5–6 | T–6th | — | 66 |
| 1998 | Texas Tech | 11–10 | 5–6 | T–8th | — | T–64 |
| 1999 | Texas Tech | 4–18 | 2–9 | T–10th | — | — |
| Texas Tech | | 25–39 | 12–21 | | | |
| Total | | 53–61 | | | | |
^{#}Final ITA Team Rankings

=== Men's college ===
| Season | Team | Overall | Conference | Finish | Postseason | ITA^{#} |
|---|---|---|---|---|---|---|
Texas Tech Red Raiders (SWC 1993–1996), (Big 12 1997–present)
| 1993 | Texas Tech | 14–10 | 2–4 | T–5th | — | — |
| 1994 | Texas Tech | 12–13 | 1–5 | T–5th | — | — |
| 1995 | Texas Tech | 11–12 | 1–5 | T–6th | — | — |
| 1996 | Texas Tech | 13–9 | 2–4 | 5th | NCAA Regional | 42 |
| 1997 | Texas Tech | 11–14 | 4–5 | T–5th | NCAA Regional | 71 |
| 1998 | Texas Tech | 11–15 | 2–7 | 8th | NCAA Regional | 57 |
| 1999 | Texas Tech | 15–10 | 4–4 | T–4th | NCAA First Round | 36 |
| 2000 | Texas Tech | 9–12 | 3–5 | 6th | — | T–75 |
| 2001 | Texas Tech | 7–15 | 1–7 | 8th | — | — |
| 2002 | Texas Tech | 14–11 | 3–4 | T–4th | — | 57 |
| 2003 | Texas Tech | 13–8 | 3–4 | 5th | — | 62 |
| 2004 | Texas Tech | 12–12 | 2–5 | 6th | — | 63 |
| 2005 | Texas Tech | 25–4 | 5–2 | T–2nd | NCAA Round of 16 | 12 |
| 2006 | Texas Tech | 13–11 | 2–5 | 6th | — | 48 |
| 2007 | Texas Tech | 14–10 | 2–4 | T–4th | NCAA Second Round | 33 |
| 2008 | Texas Tech | 20–6 | 4–2 | T–3rd | NCAA Second Round | 20 |
| 2009 | Texas Tech | 13–11 | 2–4 | 5th | NCAA First Round | 39 |
| 2010 | Texas Tech | 22–6 | 3–3 | 4th | NCAA Second Round | 15 |
| 2011 | Texas Tech | 17–10 | 3–3 | T–3rd | NCAA Second Round | 21 |
| 2012 | Texas Tech | In progress | | | | |
| Texas Tech | | 266–200 | 49–82 | | | |
| Total | | 266–200 | | | | |
^{#}Final ITA Team Rankings; References:
