= Howard Endelman =

American tennis player

- Full name: Howard Michael Endelman
- Country (sports): United States
- Born: July 30, 1965 (age 60) New York City, New York

Singles
- Highest ranking: No. 609 (July 14, 1986)

Doubles
- Career record: 4–9
- Highest ranking: No. 183 (July 25, 1988)

Grand Slam doubles results
- US Open: 1R (1988)

Howard Michael Endelman (born July 30, 1965) is a former American lawyer, professional tennis player, businessman, and tennis coach.

== Biography ==
Endelman, who grew up on New York's Long Island, played collegiate tennis at Columbia University, before turning professional in 1987.

Most of his matches on the professional tour were as a doubles player, reaching a career best doubles ranking of 183. His best performances on the Grand Prix circuit were quarter-finals appearances at Boston and Schenectady in 1988, partnering John Sobel on both occasions. He competed in the main draw of the men's doubles at the 1988 US Open, with Peter Palandjian.

=== Education and career ===
Retiring after the 1989 season, Endelman served as head coach of the women's tennis team at Columbia until 1992. He then studied at Boston College and graduated with a J.D. After practicing law for three years at the international law firm of Clifford, Chance, Rogers & Wells, he later moved on to a business career, which included positions as a vice president in investment banking at Merrill Lynch from 1998 to 2005, an Executive Vice President at InsideOut Sports & Entertainment from 2005 to 2007, and as a founding partner of Baseline Partners, a private equity investment firm based in India from 2007 to 2010.

From 2010 until 2019 he was the associate head coach of the Columbia men's tennis team. He assumed the mantle of head coach in 2019 after head coach Bid Goswami retired.

=== Coaching career ===
- Head Coach of Men's Tennis and Director of Tennis Operations - Columbia University, 2019–Present
- Associate Head Coach of Men's Tennis - Columbia University, 2010–2019
- Head Coach of Women's Tennis - Columbia University, 1989–1992

== Challenger titles ==
=== Doubles: (2) ===
No.	Year	Tournament	Surface	Partner	Opponents	Score
1.	1988	Dijon, France	Carpet	Gavin Pfitzner	Mihnea-Ion Nastase; Fernando Pérez Pascal	7–6, 6–7, 6–4
2.	1989	Chicoutimi, Canada	Clay	John Sobel	Karsten Braasch; Willi Otten	3–6, 6–4, 6–4
