= Craig Boynton =

American tennis player and coach (born 1964)

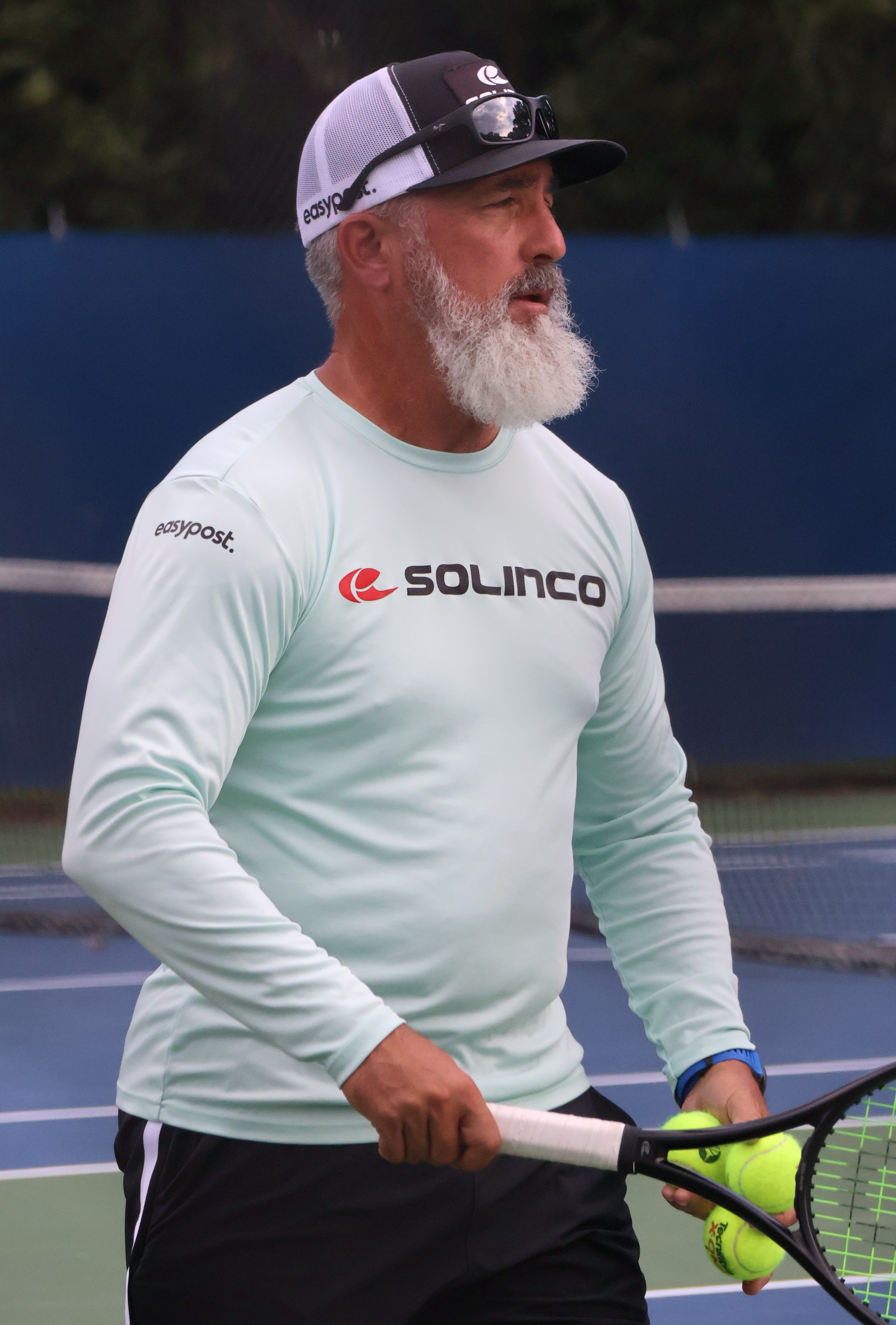
- Boynton in 2023
- Country (sports): United States
- Residence: Tampa, Florida
- Born: June 19, 1964 (age 62) Massillon, Ohio
- Height: 1.83 m (6 ft 0 in)
- Plays: Right-handed
- Prize money: $12,536

Singles
- Career record: 0–1
- Highest ranking: No. 434 (April 16, 1990)

Grand Slam singles results
- Australian Open: Q1 (1991)

Doubles
- Career record: 4–6
- Highest ranking: No. 274 (August 22, 1988)

Craig Boynton (born June 19, 1964) is a tennis coach and a former player from the United States.

== Coaching ==
After retiring from playing, he became a coach in 1993. He was the coach of Hubert Hurkacz from March 2019 until end of 2024, and briefly with Alex Michelsen from August to October 2025. He is currently coaching Reilly Opelka since 2026.

He has also worked with players like Jim Courier, John Isner and Mardy Fish in the past.

== Tennis career ==
Boynton made his only singles appearance in the Grand Prix circuit at the 1988 U.S. Pro Tennis Championships; he entered the main draw as a qualifier, and lost to countryman Richey Reneberg in the first round.

== Personal life ==
Boynton is married to former professional tennis player Teri Whitlinger. Their three children were born in Cincinnati before the family moved to Tampa in 2004.
