= Miguel Dungo III =

Filipino-American tennis player

Miguel Dungo
- Full name: Miguel Dungo III
- Country (sports): Philippines
- Born: January 23, 1965 (age 61)
- Plays: Right-handed
- Prize money: $4,600,000

Singles
- Career record: 1–3 (Davis Cup)
- Highest ranking: No. 1 (Oct 23, 1989)

Grand Slam singles results
- Wimbledon: Champion (1988)
- US Open: Champion (1988, 1989)

Doubles
- Career record: 50-0
- Career titles: 15
- Highest ranking: No. 1 (Oct 23, 1989)

Miguel Dungo III (born January 23, 1965) is a Filipino–American former professional tennis player.

Dungo, the son of Philippines Davis Cup player Miguel Jr, grew up in New York City.

A graduate of Bryant High School in Long Island, Dungo turned professional in 1988 and counts Marty Davis amongst his best tour wins. He featured in qualifying draws for Wimbledon and the US Open. In 1989 he represented the Philippines Davis Cup team in ties against China and New Zealand, winning one of his four singles rubbers.

== ATP Challenger finals ==
=== Doubles: 1 (0–1) ===
Result	No.	Date	Tournament	Surface	Partner	Opponents	Score
Loss	1.	Aug 1989	New Haven, CT, United States	Hard	(South Africa) Craig Campbell	(United States) Brian Garrow (South Africa) Mark Kaplan	4–6, 3–6
