= Peter Moraing =

German tennis player

- Country (sports): West Germany
- Residence: Mülheim
- Born: September 13, 1961 (age 64) Essen, West Germany
- Height: 1.93 m (6 ft 4 in)
- Turned pro: 1983
- Plays: Right-handed
- Prize money: $86,834

Singles
- Career record: 7–18
- Career titles: 0
- Highest ranking: No. 142 (2 February 1987)

Grand Slam singles results
- Wimbledon: 1R (1993)

Doubles
- Career record: 0–7
- Career titles: 0
- Highest ranking: No. 281 (23 March 1987)

Grand Slam doubles results
- Wimbledon: 1R (1988)

Peter Moraing (born 13 September 1961) is a former professional tennis player from West Germany.

== Career ==
Moraing appeared at two Wimbledon Championships during his career. In the 1993 tournament he faced tenth seed Andrei Medvedev in the opening round and won the first set in a tiebreak, but went on to lose in four sets. The West German competed in the men's doubles at the 1993 Wimbledon Championships, with his younger brother Heiner Moraing. They were beaten in the first round by the Spanish pairing over Sergio Casal and Emilio Sánchez.

He defeated top 30 player Slobodan Živojinović at the Open de Moselle in 1986 and also that year had a win over Todd Witsken, en route to the Tokyo Outdoor round of 16.

Moraing is now a tennis coach and runs a tennis center with his brother in Mülheim.

== Challenger titles ==
=== Singles: (1) ===
No.	Year	Tournament	Surface	Opponent	Score
1.	1987	Vina Del Mar, Chile	Clay	(Argentina) Roberto Azar	4–6, 6–1, 6–4
