= Heiner Moraing =

German tennis player

- Country (sports): West Germany
- Residence: Mülheim
- Born: 3 August 1964 (age 61); Essen, West Germany
- Height: 1.90 m (6 ft 3 in)
- Plays: Right-handed
- Prize money: $36,539

Singles
- Career record: 4–7
- Career titles: 0
- Highest ranking: No. 135 (4 July 1988)

Grand Slam singles results
- Australian Open: 2R (1989)
- Wimbledon: 2R (1988)

Doubles
- Career record: 2–4
- Career titles: 0
- Highest ranking: No. 193 (2 May 1988)

Grand Slam doubles results
- Australian Open: 1R (1989)
- Wimbledon: 1R (1988)

Heiner Moraing (born 3 August 1964) is a former professional tennis player from West Germany.

== Career ==
To qualify for the 1988 Wimbledon Championships, Moraing managed to defeat former quarter-finalist Vijay Amritraj in his final qualification match, which went for five sets, including two tiebreaks, before being won by West German 8–6 in the fifth. He defeated British wildcard Mark Petchey in the first round of the main draw, but lost in the second round, to fellow qualifier Barry Moir, in four sets. With his elder brother Peter as his partner, Moraing competed in the men's doubles as well. The pair were eliminated in the opening round by Sergio Casal and Emilio Sánchez.

He also took part in both the singles and doubles draws of the 1989 Australian Open. In the singles he had a win in the opening round, over Thierry Tulasne, who retired in the third set with sickness, after losing the first two sets. He was unable to progress past fourth seed Stefan Edberg in his next match, losing in straight sets. The West German didn't do as well in the doubles, with he and partner Torben Theine losing in the first round.

Outside of Grand Slams, Moraing had his best performance on tour at the 1988 German Open, where he beat the 42nd ranked player in the world Eric Jelen. The previous year, he reached the semifinals of a Challenger event in Vancouver and advanced to the doubles final in Bossonnens, partnering with Alexander Mronz.

Moraing is now a tennis coach and runs a tennis center with his brother in Mülheim.
