= Stephan Medem =

Swiss tennis player

- Country (sports): Switzerland
- Residence: Oberdorf
- Born: 2 April 1960 (age 65) Lucerne, Switzerland
- Height: 1.85 m (6 ft 1 in)
- Plays: Left-handed
- Prize money: $19,754

Singles
- Career record: 0–2
- Career titles: 0
- Highest ranking: No. 219 (15 September 1986)

Grand Slam singles results
- French Open: 1R (1986)

Doubles
- Career record: 1–6
- Career titles: 0
- Highest ranking: No. 144 (23 June 1986)

Grand Slam doubles results
- French Open: 1R (1986)
- Wimbledon: 2R (1988)

Mixed doubles

Grand Slam mixed doubles results
- French Open: 1R (1986)

Stephan Medem (born 2 April 1960) is a former professional tennis player from Switzerland.

== Career ==
Medem, the 1974 Swiss Junior Champion, played college tennis in the United States, for Tyler Junior College in the NJCAA. He was an All-American in 1984.

He took part in the main draw of the singles, men's doubles and mixed doubles at the 1986 French Open, but didn't make it past the first round in any of them. In the singles he was beaten in straight sets by Frenchman Jean-Philippe Fleurian.

Medem teamed up with Finland's Olli Rahnasto to reach the second round of the men's doubles at the 1988 Wimbledon Championships, with a five set opening round win. It would be Medem's only win at a Grand Slam tournament.

The Lucerne born player was most successful on the Challenger doubles circuit, reaching five finals and winning two of them, at Thessaloniki and Nairobi.

== Challenger titles ==
=== Doubles: (2) ===
No.	Year	Tournament	Surface	Partner	Opponents	Score
1.	1985	Thessaloniki, Greece	Hard	(India) Srinivasan Vasudevan	(South Africa) Brian Levine (United States) Billy Nealon	6–3, 5–7, 6–3
2.	1988	Nairobi, Kenya	Clay	(United States) Bud Cox	(Italy) Ugo Colombini (Mexico) Agustín Moreno	7–6, 4–6, 6–4
