= 1988 U.S. Pro Tennis Championships =

- Date: July 4–10
- Edition: 61st
- Category: Grand Prix
- Draw: 56S / 28D
- Prize money: $297,500
- Surface: Clay / outdoor
- Location: Chestnut Hill, Massachusetts, US
- Venue: Longwood Cricket Club

Champions

Singles
- (Austria) Thomas Muster

Doubles
- (Mexico) Jorge Lozano / (United States) Todd Witsken
- U.S. Pro Tennis Championships

The 1988 U.S. Pro Tennis Championships, also known by its sponsored name Shawmut U.S. Pro Championships, was a men's tennis tournament played on outdoor green clay courts at the Longwood Cricket Club in Chestnut Hill, Massachusetts in the United States. The event was part of the Super Series of the 1988 Nabisco Grand Prix circuit. It was the 61st edition of the tournament and was held from July 4 through July 10, 1988. Eighth-seeded Thomas Muster won the singles title, his second at the event after 1985.

== Finals ==
=== Singles ===
(Austria) Thomas Muster defeated (United States) Lawson Duncan 6–2, 6–2

- It was Muster's 1st singles title of the year and the 2nd of his career.

=== Doubles ===
(Mexico) Jorge Lozano / (United States) Todd Witsken defeated (Socialist Federal Republic of Yugoslavia) Bruno Orešar / (Peru) Jaime Yzaga 6–2, 7–5
