= Peter Palandjian =

Armenian-American businessman and tennis player (born 1964)

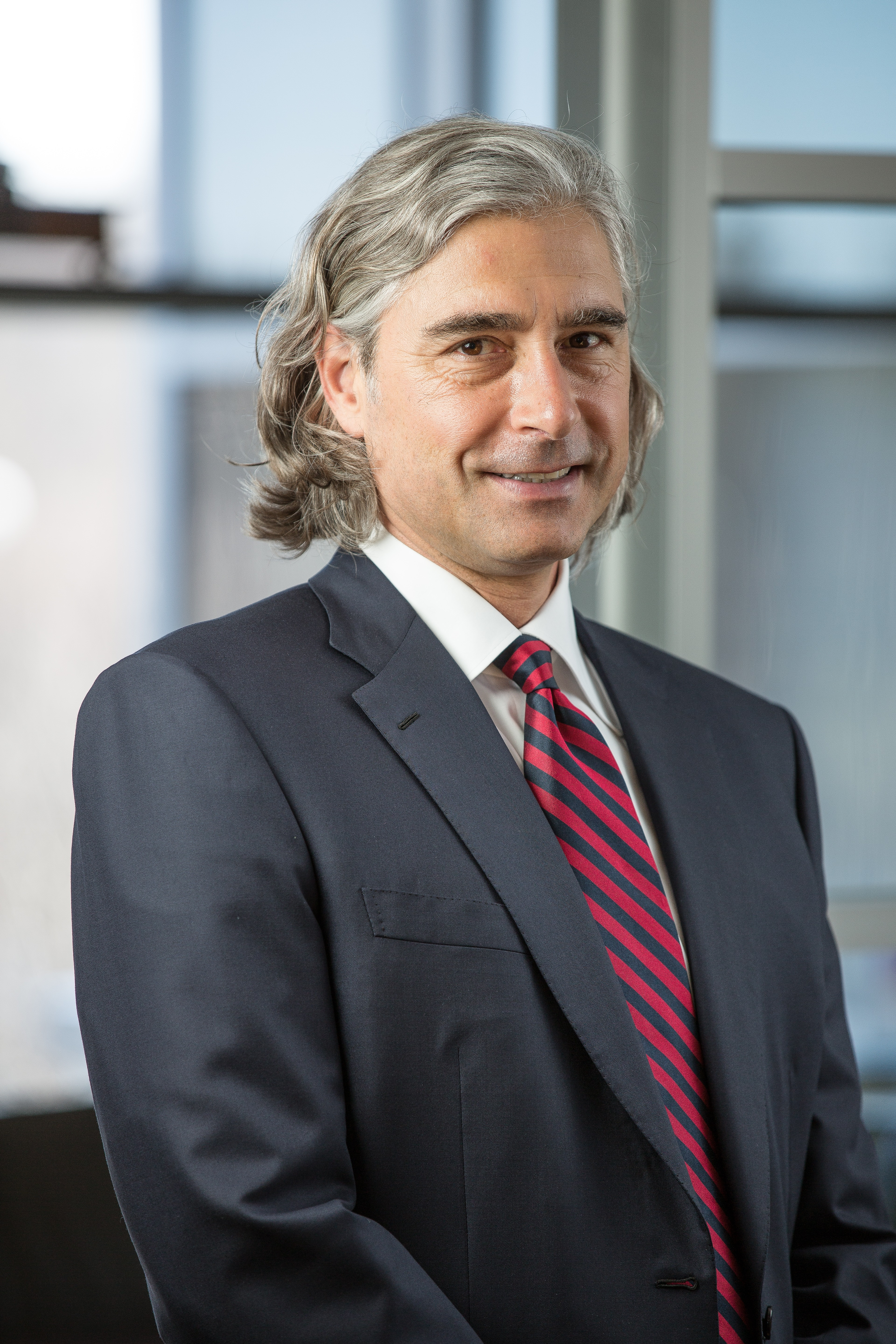
- Country (sports): United States
- Born: February 12, 1964 (age 62) Boston, Massachusetts
- Turned pro: 1987
- Retired: 1989
- Prize money: $30,728

Singles
- Career record: 1–4
- Career titles: 0
- Highest ranking: No. 280 (August 15, 1988)

Doubles
- Career record: 1–11
- Career titles: 0
- Highest ranking: No. 175 (July 10, 1989)

Grand Slam doubles results
- French Open: 1R (1988, 1989)
- Wimbledon: 1R (1988)
- US Open: 1R (1988)

Peter Palandjian (born February 12, 1964) is an American businessman and former professional tennis player. Palandjian became chief executive officer of Intercontinental Real Estate Corporation in 1993. The company was founded by his father, Petros, in 1959.

== Early life and education ==
Born in Boston, to a family of Armenian descent. Palandjian attended Phillips Academy Andover and Harvard University, from which he graduated with a BA in Literature in 1987. He enrolled in Harvard Business School and earned an MBA, graduating in 1993.

While at Harvard, he twice captained the Harvard tennis team and played in the NCAA championships, both in singles and doubles, as the team's number one player.

== Career ==
=== Business ===
Palandjian worked for two years with Bain & Company, as an associate. He was then an assistant to the chief executive officer of Staples, while attending Harvard Business School.

Since 1993 he has been chief executive officer of Intercontinental Real Estate Corporation, which was originally a construction company and was founded in Boston in 1959 by his father, an immigrant to the United States, Petros A. Palandjian.

Under Peter's leadership, the company evolved its core business from fully integrated services and investment partnerships, to private equity real estate structured in fund-based investment management and advisory services.

=== Tennis ===
Palandjian competed professionally after leaving college and won six ATP tour Challenger titles, all in doubles. He also made main draw appearances in singles and doubles at various Grand Prix tournaments. Notable victories include wins over Jay Lapidus (Stratton Mountain, 1987), Ricardo Acuna and Mark Dickson (Raleigh, 1987) Tony Mmoh (Boston, 1998), Martin Laurendeau (Miami, 1998), Andrew Sznajder (Seattle, 1998). One of his doubles partners, at the 1988 U.S. Pro Tennis Championships in Boston, was future world number one Jim Courier. In 1988 he featured in the men's doubles at three Grand Slam events, the French Open, Wimbledon Championships and US Open. He also played men's doubles at the 1989 French Open and mixed doubles at the 1989 Wimbledon Championships. His brother, Paul, was also a collegiate tennis player. The pair played a Grand Prix tournament together at Boston in 1989. During Palandjian's highest career world ranking in doubles he reached No. 175 on July 10, 1989.

Palandjian retired from tennis in 1989.

== Personal life ==
Palandjian lives in Cambridge, Massachusetts, and has four children with his former wife Marie-Louise Palandjian. His daughter Manon oversees marketing and communications for his family's company.

He married actress Eliza Dushku in August 2018. In February 2019, Dushku announced that she was pregnant with their first child. In August 2019, their first son was born, their second son was born in 2021.

== Controversy ==
Since October 2023, Palandjian has faced criticism from pro-Palestinian activists for Intercontinental Real Estate Corporation's decision to lease one of its Cambridge, Massachusetts properties to the American subsidiary of Israeli defense company Elbit Systems. In June 2024, approximately 100 protestors rallied outside Palandjian's Cambridge home demanding Palandjian and Intercontinental remove Elbit Systems from this Intercontinental property in Cambridge.

== Challenger titles ==
=== Doubles: (5) ===
No.	Year	Tournament	Surface	Partner	Opponents	Score
1.	1987	Bossonnens, Switzerland	Hard	(United States) Bud Schultz	(West Germany) Heiner Moraing (West Germany) Alexander Mronz	6–4, 6–3
2.	1987	Helsinki, Finland	Carpet	(United States) Bud Schultz	(Sweden) Nicklas Utgren (Finland) Pasi Virtanen	7–6, 6–4
3.	1988	Aptos, U. S.	Hard	(United States) Jeff Klaparda	(United States) Ed Nagel (United States) Jeff Tarango	6–3, 6–4
4.	1988	New Haven, U. S.	Hard	(United States) Jeff Klaparda	(India) Zeeshan Ali (United Kingdom) Chris Bailey	6–2, 7–5
5.	1988	Helsinki, Finland	Carpet	(United States) Luke Jensen	(West Germany) Jörg Müller (United Kingdom) James Turner	7–6, 3–6, 6–3
