= Lawson Duncan =

American tennis player

- Country (sports): United States
- Residence: North Carolina
- Born: 26 October 1964 (age 61) Asheville, North Carolina, US
- Height: 6 ft 1 in (1.85 m)
- Turned pro: 1984
- Retired: 1991
- Plays: Right-handed (one-handed backhand)
- Prize money: $514,450

Singles
- Career record: 105–110
- Career titles: 0
- Highest ranking: No. 47 (20 May 1985)

Grand Slam singles results
- French Open: 4R (1989)
- Wimbledon: 1R (1990)
- US Open: 2R (1989)

Doubles
- Career record: 11–31
- Career titles: 0
- Highest ranking: No. 182 (6 April 1987)

Lawson Duncan (born October 26, 1964) is a retired American tennis player. The right-hander reached his highest Association of Tennis Professionals singles ranking on May 20, 1985, when he became world No. 47. His best performance in a grand slam tennis tournament was the 1989 French Open, where he reached the fourth round.

A pioneer of the heavy topspin game, he was an All-America at Clemson University his freshman year before turning pro. He plays in exhibition matches against longtime friend and former pro Tim Wilkison during special banquets in the Asheville area.

Duncan graduated from Asheville High School in 1983.

Since 2006 he has taught privately at Asheville Racquet Club-Downtown, located in West Asheville, North Carolina.

== Grand Prix / ATP career finals ==
=== Singles: 6 (0–6) ===
Result	W-L	Date	Tournament	Surface	Opponent	Score
Loss	0–1	Apr 1985	Bari, Italy	Clay	(Italy) Claudio Panatta	2–6, 6–1, 6–7
Loss	0–2	Apr 1985	Marbella, Spain	Clay	(Argentina) Horacio de la Peña	0–6, 3–6
Loss	0–3	May 1985	Madrid, Spain	Clay	(West Germany) Andreas Maurer	5–7, 2–6
Loss	0–4	Jul 1988	Boston, US	Clay	(Austria) Thomas Muster	2–6, 2–6
Loss	0–5	May 1989	Charleston, US	Clay	(United States) Jay Berger	4–6, 3–6
Loss	0–6	Jun 1990	Florence, Italy	Clay	(Sweden) Magnus Larsson	7–6, 5–7, 0–6
