= Andrew Burrow =

South African tennis player

- Country (sports): South Africa
- Born: 17 June 1963 (age 62) George, South Africa
- Height: 5 ft 10 in (178 cm)
- Plays: Right-handed

Singles
- Career record: 3–8
- Career titles: 0
- Highest ranking: No. 276 (12 June 1989)

Grand Slam singles results
- US Open: 2R (1988)

Doubles
- Career record: 5–8
- Career titles: 0
- Highest ranking: No. 227 (16 July 1984)

Andrew Burrow (born 17 June 1963) is a former professional tennis player from South Africa.

== Career ==
Burrow attended the University of Miami for four years, during which time he competed in the NCAA Championships. He was the Division I singles champion in 1987. This earned him a wildcard entry into the 1987 US Open, where he met Ronald Agenor in the opening round. Agenor beat Burrow in four sets. Also that year, he and Richey Reneberg were doubles quarter-finalists at the U.S. Pro Tennis Championships in Boston.

In the 1988 US Open, which he had to qualify for, Burrow defeated West German Udo Riglewski in the first round. He lost his second round match in four sets to Marcelo Ingaramo of Argentina.

Andrew is a member of The University of Miami Sports Hall of Fame, The Intercollegiate Tennis Hall of Fame and The Blue Gray Hall of Fame.

Andrew currently oversees the Racquet program at The Reserve Club in Aiken, SC. He has coached several USTA league teams to the State, Sectional and National levels. Andrew started his junior coaching program, Burrow Academy, in 2017 and has seen participants receive college tennis scholarships.
