= Zeeshan Ali =

Indian tennis player

- Country (sports): India
- Residence: Bangalore, Karnataka, India
- Born: 1 January 1970 (age 56) Calcutta, India
- Height: 1.80 m (5 ft 11 in)
- Turned pro: 1988
- Retired: 1995
- Plays: Right-handed
- Prize money: US$45,664

Singles
- Career record: 4–14
- Career titles: 0; 0 Challenger, 0 Futures
- Highest ranking: No. 126 (12 December 1988)

Grand Slam singles results
- Wimbledon: 1R (1988)

Doubles
- Career record: 4–8
- Career titles: 0; 3 Challenger, 0 Futures
- Highest ranking: No. 149 (14 November 1988)

Grand Slam doubles results
- Wimbledon: 2R (1988, 1989)
- Last updated on: 2 December 2021.

Zeeshan Ali (born 1 January 1970) is a former Indian Davis Cup player who also competed at the 1988 Summer Olympics in Seoul. The right-hander reached his highest singles ATP ranking on 12 December 1988, when he became the number 126 of the world when he was still 3 weeks short of his 19th birthday.

== Career ==
He remained in the top 130 (with the exception of a couple of weeks) until August 1992. His singles highlights in 1988 included winning the Indian Satellite Circuit, making R2 of the ATP tour event in Schenectady (losing to Johan Kriek in R2) and at the Seoul Olympics (where he lost to Jacob Hlasek in R2), making the finals of a Challenger in New Haven, Connecticut (losing to Vijay Amritraj) and the semifinal of a Challenger in Indonesia. Those performances had taken Zeeshan to 178 in the singles rankings in November 1988. Zeeshan then dominated a Satellite circuit in Japan to finish the year as 126 in singles. At the end of 1988, Zeeshan's doubles ranking was at 154.

In 1989, Zeeshan made the quarter-finals of a Challenger in Nigeria early in the year, and then qualified into tour events in Key Biscayne, Tokyo (where he beat Leif Shiras before losing to Stefan Edberg in R2), Schenactady in R2, Singapore and London (Queen's Club). In 1989 he played his only Grand Slam match in singles, losing to Wally Masur at Wimbledon.Also in 1989, he made second round in doubles at Wimbledon with Jonathan Canter (losing to the seeded pair of Kevin Curren and David Pate in four sets), and won two Challenger doubles titles (in Kuala Lumpur and Beijing). In 1988, he also made the second round of the Wimbledon doubles (with Mark Ferreira), two Challenger doubles finals and four Challenger semi-finals (one of them with 37-year-old Anand Amritraj). Even in 1990, he won a Challenger doubles title (in Winnetka, Illinois) and made another Challenger doubles final (in Kenya), although playing a much lighter schedule. But after 1992, Zeeshan was mainly playing Challengers and Satellites in India and Asia. He won the Gold in the Asian Games in 1994 and Bronze in 1990.

Zeeshan was also ranked number 2 in the world and #1 in Asia in the Juniors in 1986. Zeeshan won a total of 14 ITF junior tournaments that year and reached the semi-finals of Singles and Doubles at Junior Wimbledon. Later in the same year Zeeshan also reached the Juniors doubles finals at the US Open. He stopped playing on the professional circuit in 1995 due to a back injury.

Zeeshan has won a total of 7 Indian men's singles and 4 Doubles National Championships. He is the youngest men's national champion having won the first National championship at the age of 16.

Zeeshan played Davis Cup for India from 1987 to 1994. He was the member of the Indian Davis Cup team that reached the Davis Cup Finals in 1987 and Semi-finals in 1993. Zeeshan is the current National and Davis Cup Coach of India and was the Captain of the Indian Fed Cup team in 2015. He was Captain of the Indian team at the 2016 Rio Olympics and Asian Games in 2018 and 2022. He is also the Director of Tennis at the National Tennis Centre in Delhi.

In 2014, Zeeshan was awarded the prestigious Dhyan Chand Award from the President of India for his contribution to tennis in India. In 2023 he received the ITF Award for Service to the Sport of Tennis.

== Personal life ==
Before returning to India in 2012, Zeeshan was running his tennis academies in Dubai and was the Davis Cup Coach of the UAE. He is currently married with two kids and has his tennis academies in Bangalore and Greater Noida. His wife Tehmineh manages the running of the academies.

== ATP Challenger and ITF Futures finals ==
=== Doubles: 4 (3–1) ===
Legend ATP Challenger (3–1) ITF Futures (0–0)	Finals by surface Hard (3–0) Clay (0–1) Grass (0–0) Carpet (0–0)

Result	W–L	Date	Tournament	Tier	Surface	Partner	Opponents	Score
Win	1–0	Aug 1989	Kuala Lumpur, Malaysia	Challenger	Hard	(Australia) Steve Guy	(Denmark) Morten Christensen (Denmark) Peter Flintsoe	6–4, 6–4
Win	2–0	Nov 1989	Beijing, China	Challenger	Hard	(Australia) Bruce Derlin	(United States) Brian Devening (United States) Craig Johnson	6–4, 6–4
Loss	2–1	Feb 1990	Nairobi, Kenya	Challenger	Clay	(Czech Republic) Libor Pimek	(Portugal) João Cunha-Silva (Belgium) Eduardo Masso	4–6, 5–7
Win	3–1	Aug 1990	Winnetka, United States	Challenger	Hard	(Netherlands) Menno Oosting	(United States) Doug Flach (Mexico) Luis-Enrique Herrera	4–6, 6–3, 6–2

== Junior Grand Slam finals ==
=== Doubles: 1 (1 runner-up) ===
Result	Year	Championship	Surface	Partner	Opponents	Score
Loss	1987	US Open	Hard	(Australia) Brett Steven	(Croatia) Goran Ivanišević (Italy) Diego Nargiso	6–3, 4–6, 3–6
