= 1987 Seoul Open – Doubles =

Doubles
- 1987 Seoul Open

Final
- Champions: (United States) Eric Korita (United States) Rick Leach
- Runners-up: (United States) Ken Flach (United States) Jim Grabb
- Score: 6–7, 6–1, 7–5

Details
- Draw: 16
- Seeds: 4

Events
Singles	Doubles
Seoul Open	· 1988 →

This was the first edition of the event.

Eric Korita and Rick Leach won in the final 6–7, 6–1, 7–5, against Ken Flach and Jim Grabb.

== Seeds ==
1. (United States) Kelly Jones / (United States) Tim Pawsat (first round)
2. (United States) Andy Kohlberg / (United States) Robert Van't Hof (quarterfinals)
3. (United States) Mike De Palmer / (United States) Ben Testerman (first round)
4. (Canada) Glenn Michibata / (United States) Brad Pearce (quarterfinals)

== Draw ==
=== Key ===
- Q = Qualifier
- WC = Wild card
- LL = Lucky loser
- Alt = Alternate
- ITF = ITF entry
- PR = Protected ranking
- SR = Special ranking
- SE = Special exempt
- JE = Junior exempt
- JR = Junior Accelerator Programme entrant
- CO = College Accelerator Programme entrant
- NG = Next Gen Accelerator Program entrant
- w/o = Walkover
- r = Retired
- d = Defaulted

=== Draw ===
First round
1	(United States) K Jones (United States) T Pawsat	6	3
(United Kingdom) A Castle (United States) J Levine	7	6
(India) R Krishnan (New Zealand) R Simpson	7	6
(United States) B Green (United States) B Schultz	6	2
4	(Canada) G Michibata (United States) B Pearce	4	6	7
(France) J-P Fleurian (Netherlands) M Schapers	6	1	5
(Japan) S Shiraishi (Japan) H Shirato	3	6
(United States) E Korita (United States) M Leach	6	7
(South Korea) D-W Song (South Korea) J-S Yoo	6	6	6
(Sweden) P Carlsson (Peru) J Yzaga	2	7	2
(United States) P Chamberlin (United States) M Kures	6	6
3	(United States) M De Palmer (United States) B Testerman	3	4
(United States) Jay Lapidus (United States) P Wright	6	3
(United States) K Flach (United States) J Grabb	7	6
(United States) B Cox (United States) R Matuszewski	5	3
2	(United States) A Kohlberg (United States) R Van't Hof	7	6

Quarterfinals
(United Kingdom) A Castle (United States) J Levine	6	7	6
(India) R Krishnan (New Zealand) R Simpson	7	5	3
4	(Canada) G Michibata (United States) B Pearce	6	5
(United States) E Korita (United States) M Leach	7	7
(South Korea) D-W Song (South Korea) J-S Yoo	7	5	2
(United States) P Chamberlin (United States) M Kures	5	7	6
(United States) K Flach (United States) J Grabb	6	6	6
2	(United States) A Kohlberg (United States) R Van't Hof	7	3	4

Semifinals
(United Kingdom) A Castle (United States) J Levine	1	7	2
(United States) E Korita (United States) M Leach	6	6	6
(United States) P Chamberlin (United States) M Kures	6	6
(United States) K Flach (United States) J Grabb	7	7

Final
(United States) E Korita (United States) M Leach	6	6	7
(United States) K Flach (United States) J Grabb	7	1	5
