= 1987 Seoul Open – Singles =

Singles
- 1987 Seoul Open

Final
- Champion: (United States) Jim Grabb
- Runner-up: (United States) Andre Agassi
- Score: 1–6, 6–4, 6–2

Details
- Draw: 32
- Seeds: 8

Events
Singles	Doubles
Seoul Open	· 1988 →

This was the first edition of the Seoul Open.

Jim Grabb won the tournament, beating Andre Agassi in the final, 1–6, 6–4, 6–2.

== Seeds ==
1. (India) Ramesh Krishnan (first round)
2. (United States) Jim Grabb (champion)
3. (Peru) Jaime Yzaga (second round)
4. (United States) Richard Matuszewski (first round)
5. (France) Jean-Philippe Fleurian (semifinals)
6. (United States) Ben Testerman (semifinals)
7. (Netherlands) Michiel Schapers (quarterfinals)
8. (United States) Andre Agassi (final)

== Draw ==
=== Key ===
- Q = Qualifier
- WC = Wild card
- LL = Lucky loser
- Alt = Alternate
- ITF = ITF entry
- PR = Protected ranking
- SR = Special ranking
- SE = Special exempt
- JE = Junior exempt
- JR = Junior Accelerator Programme entrant
- CO = College Accelerator Programme entrant
- NG = Next Gen Accelerator Program entrant
- w/o = Walkover
- r = Retired
- d = Defaulted

=== Finals ===
Semifinals
8	(United States) Andre Agassi	2	6	6
6	(United States) Ben Testerman	6	3	2
5	(France) Jean-Philippe Fleurian	2	6
2	(United States) Jim Grabb	6	7

Final
8	(United States) Andre Agassi	6	4	2
2	(United States) Jim Grabb	1	6	6

=== Top half ===
First round
1	(India) R Krishnan	6	1
(United States) K Jones	7	6
(Australia) J Fitzgerald	6	3	6
(United States) Jay Lapidus	3	6	3
(United States) B Schultz	7	2	3
(New Zealand) R Simpson	5	6	6
(United States) B Cox	6	6	5
8	(United States) A Agassi	7	3	7
3	(Peru) J Yzaga	6	7
(Sweden) P Carlsson	4	6
Q	(South Korea) W-r Lee	3	4
(United States) M Leach	6	6
(United States) P Chamberlin	7	6
WC	(South Korea) G-t Roh	6	3
Q	(United Kingdom) A Castle	5	6	6
6	(United States) B Testerman	7	3	7

Second round
(United States) K Jones	5	6
(Australia) J Fitzgerald	7	7
(New Zealand) R Simpson	4	1
8	(United States) A Agassi	6	6
3	(Peru) J Yzaga	3	6	6
(United States) M Leach	6	2	7
(United States) P Chamberlin	1	0
6	(United States) B Testerman	6	6

Quarterfinals
(Australia) J Fitzgerald	1	3
8	(United States) A Agassi	6	6
(United States) M Leach	6	1
6	(United States) B Testerman	7	6

Semifinals
8	(United States) A Agassi	2	6	6
6	(United States) B Testerman	6	3	2

=== Bottom half ===
First round
5	(France) J-P Fleurian	3	7	6
(United States) B Pearce	6	6	4
(United States) M De Palmer	6	4
(United States) M Kures	7	6
Q	(South Korea) B-S Kim	6	6
WC	(South Korea) J-S Yoo	2	4
(United States) J Sadri	6	6
4	(United States) R Matuszewski	3	1
7	(Netherlands) M Schapers	6	6
Q	(United States) P Wright	4	2
WC	(South Korea) D-W Song	6	6	6
(United States) B Green	7	3	4
(United States) K Flach	5	6	0
(Canada) G Michibata	7	4	6
(United States) J Levine	2	3
2	(United States) J Grabb	6	6

Second round
5	(France) J-P Fleurian	7	6
(United States) M Kures	6	3
Q	(South Korea) B-S Kim	3	6
(United States) J Sadri	6	7
7	(Netherlands) M Schapers	7	4	6
WC	(South Korea) D-W Song	5	6	2
(Canada) G Michibata	6	1
2	(United States) J Grabb	7	6

Quarterfinals
5	(France) J-P Fleurian	6	1	6
(United States) J Sadri	4	6	3
7	(Netherlands) M Schapers	3	3
2	(United States) J Grabb	6	6

Semifinals
5	(France) J-P Fleurian	2	6
2	(United States) J Grabb	6	7
