= 1988 Seoul Open – Singles =

Singles
- 1988 Seoul Open

Final
- Champion: (United States) Dan Goldie
- Runner-up: (United Kingdom) Andrew Castle
- Score: 6–3, 6–7^{(5–7)}, 6–0

Details
- Draw: 32
- Seeds: 8

Events
Singles	Doubles
← 1987 ·	Seoul Open	· 1989 →

Jim Grabb was the defending champion, but lost in the first round this year.

Dan Goldie won the tournament, beating Andrew Castle in the final, 6–3, 6–7^{(5–7)}, 6–0.

== Seeds ==
1. (United States) Andre Agassi (second round)
2. (United States) Eliot Teltscher (semifinals)
3. (Australia) John Fitzgerald (quarterfinals)
4. (Australia) John Frawley (quarterfinals)
5. (United States) Dan Goldie (champions)
6. (United States) Jim Grabb (first round)
7. (United States) Joey Rive (quarterfinals)
8. (United States) Todd Nelson (quarterfinals)

== Draw ==
=== Key ===
- Q = Qualifier
- WC = Wild card
- LL = Lucky loser
- Alt = Alternate
- ITF = ITF entry
- PR = Protected ranking
- SR = Special ranking
- SE = Special exempt
- JE = Junior exempt
- JR = Junior Accelerator Programme entrant
- CO = College Accelerator Programme entrant
- NG = Next Gen Accelerator Program entrant
- w/o = Walkover
- r = Retired
- d = Defaulted

=== Finals ===
Semifinals
(United States) Greg Holmes	4	6
(United Kingdom) Andrew Castle	6	7
5	(United States) Dan Goldie	6	6
2	(United States) Eliot Teltscher	2	3

Final
(United Kingdom) Andrew Castle	3	7^{7}	0
5	(United States) Dan Goldie	6	6^{5}	6

=== Top half ===
First round
1	(United States) A Agassi	6	6
(United States) J Levine	1	1
(United States) G Holmes	6	6
(Nigeria) N Odizor	0	2
(United Kingdom) S Shaw	4	4
Q	(United Kingdom) C Bailey	6	6
WC	(South Korea) B-S Kim	6	4
7	(United States) J Rive	7	6
3	(Australia) J Fitzgerald	6	6
(Australia) B Drewett	3	4
WC	(South Korea) D-W Song	6	2	6
Q	(United States) J Letts	3	6	3
(West Germany) W Popp	7	6
(United States) K Jones	6	4
(United Kingdom) A Castle	6	7
6	(United States) J Grabb	3	5

Second round
1	(United States) A Agassi	3	2
(United States) G Holmes	6	6
Q	(United Kingdom) C Bailey	7	2	4
7	(United States) J Rive	6	6	6
3	(Australia) J Fitzgerald	7	6
WC	(South Korea) D-W Song	6	1
(West Germany) W Popp	6	2	2
(United Kingdom) A Castle	2	6	6

Quarterfinals
(United States) G Holmes	2	6	7
7	(United States) J Rive	6	3	6
3	(Australia) J Fitzgerald	6	3	2
(United Kingdom) A Castle	4	6	6

Semifinals
(United States) G Holmes	4	6
(United Kingdom) A Castle	6	7

=== Bottom half ===
First round
5	(United States) D Goldie	6	3	6
(United States) L Shiras	4	6	2
(Argentina) R Saad	6	3	6
(The Bahamas) R Smith	4	6	3
Q	(United States) G Layendecker	6	7
Q	(United States) L Scott	3	6
(West Germany) P Baur	2	6
4	(Australia) J Frawley	6	7
8	(United States) T Nelson	4	7	6
(United States) B Scanlon	6	6	4
(Australia) S Youl	7	3	3
(United States) M Anger	6	6	6
WC	(South Korea) J-S Yoo	6	7
(United States) P Chamberlin	4	6
(Sweden) J Carlsson	3	2
2	(United States) E Teltscher	6	6

Second round
5	(United States) D Goldie	6	6
(Argentina) R Saad	2	4
Q	(United States) G Layendecker	7	3	4
4	(Australia) J Frawley	6	6	6
8	(United States) T Nelson	1	6	6
(United States) M Anger	6	3	3
WC	(South Korea) J-S Yoo	6	3	2
2	(United States) E Teltscher	3	6	6

Quarterfinals
5	(United States) D Goldie	6	6
4	(Australia) J Frawley	2	4
8	(United States) T Nelson	6	3
2	(United States) E Teltscher	7	6

Semifinals
5	(United States) D Goldie	6	6
2	(United States) E Teltscher	2	3
