= 1988 US Open – Men's doubles =

Men's doubles
- 1988 US Open

Final
- Champion: (Spain) Sergio Casal (Spain) Emilio Sánchez
- Runner-up: (United States) Rick Leach (United States) Jim Pugh
- Score: Walkover

Details
- Draw: 64
- Seeds: 16

Events
Singles	men	women		boys	girls
Doubles	men	women	mixed	boys	girls
WC Singles	men	women	quad
WC Doubles	men	women	quad
Legends	men	women	mixed
← 1987 ·	US Open	· 1989 →

The men's doubles tournament at the 1988 US Open was held from August 29 to September 11, 1988, on the outdoor hard courts at the USTA National Tennis Center in New York City, United States. Sergio Casal and Emilio Sánchez won the title, defeating Rick Leach and Jim Pugh by walkover in the final.

== Seeds ==
1. (United States) Ken Flach / (United States) Robert Seguso (semifinals)
2. (Mexico) Jorge Lozano / (United States) Todd Witsken (semifinals)
3. (Spain) Sergio Casal / (Spain) Emilio Sánchez (champions)
4. (United States) Kevin Curren / (United States) David Pate (quarterfinals)
5. (United States) Rick Leach / (United States) Jim Pugh (final)
6. (Ecuador) Andrés Gómez / (Sweden) Anders Järryd (third round)
7. (South Africa) Pieter Aldrich / (South Africa) Danie Visser (first round)
8. (New Zealand) Kelly Evernden / (United States) Johan Kriek (second round)
9. (Czechoslovakia) Miloslav Mečíř / (Czechoslovakia) Tomáš Šmíd (third round)
10. (Australia) Wally Masur / (Australia) Mark Woodforde (second round)
11. (France) Guy Forget / (France) Henri Leconte (third round)
12. (United States) Paul Annacone / (United States) Patrick McEnroe (quarterfinals)
13. (Canada) Grant Connell / (Canada) Glenn Michibata (first round)
14. (United States) Scott Davis / (Switzerland) Jakob Hlasek (third round)
15. (Australia) Peter Doohan / (United States) Jim Grabb (third round)
16. (Sweden) Joakim Nyström / (Sweden) Mikael Pernfors (second round)

== Draw ==
=== Key ===
- Q = Qualifier
- WC = Wild card
- LL = Lucky loser
- Alt = Alternate
- ITF = ITF entry
- PR = Protected ranking
- SR = Special ranking
- SE = Special exempt
- JE = Junior exempt
- JR = Junior Accelerator Programme entrant
- CO = College Accelerator Programme entrant
- NG = Next Gen Accelerator Program entrant
- w/o = Walkover
- r = Retired
- d = Defaulted

=== Finals ===
Quarterfinals
1	(United States) Ken Flach (United States) Robert Seguso	6	6	1	6
(Australia) Laurie Warder (United States) Blaine Willenborg	3	4	6	2
4	(United States) Kevin Curren (United States) David Pate	1	7	3	2
5	(United States) Rick Leach (United States) Jim Pugh	6	6	6	6
12	(United States) Paul Annacone (United States) Patrick McEnroe	4	4	7	7	6
3	(Spain) Sergio Casal (Spain) Emilio Sánchez	6	6	5	6	7
(United States) Eric Korita (United States) Jon Levine	6	5	3	7	4
2	(Mexico) Jorge Lozano (United States) Todd Witsken	2	7	6	6	6

Semifinals
1	(United States) Ken Flach (United States) Robert Seguso	6	1	2	4
5	(United States) Rick Leach (United States) Jim Pugh	4	6	6	6
3	(Spain) Sergio Casal (Spain) Emilio Sánchez	6	6	6
2	(Mexico) Jorge Lozano (United States) Todd Witsken	4	3	2

Final
5	(United States) Rick Leach (United States) Jim Pugh
3	(Spain) Sergio Casal (Spain) Emilio Sánchez	w/o

=== Top half ===
==== Section 1 ====
First round
1	(United States) K Flach (United States) R Seguso	6	6
(United Kingdom) J Bates (Sweden) P Lundgren	3	4
(United States) J Arias (United States) B Gilbert	6	6
(United States) P Chamberlin (United States) B Dickinson	4	4
(United States) J Klaparda (United States) M Purcell	3	6
(United States) D Goldie (Netherlands) M Schapers	6	7
(Brazil) R Acioly (Brazil) L Mattar	7	3	3
15	(Australia) P Doohan (United States) J Grabb	6	6	6
10	(Australia) W Masur (Australia) M Woodforde	6	6
(Australia) J Stoltenberg (Australia) T Woodbridge	4	2
(Australia) D Cahill (Australia) S Youl	6	6
(Iran) M Bahrami (Czechoslovakia) K Nováček	4	4
(Australia) L Warder (United States) B Willenborg	7	7
(United Kingdom) A Castle (United States) T Wilkison	5	6
(Israel) G Bloom (Israel) A Mansdorf	6	3	2
8	(New Zealand) K Evernden (United States) J Kriek	1	6	6

Second round
1	(United States) K Flach (United States) R Seguso	6	4	6
(United States) J Arias (United States) B Gilbert	1	6	1
(United States) J Klaparda (United States) M Purcell	3	3
15	(Australia) P Doohan (United States) J Grabb	6	6
10	(Australia) W Masur (Australia) M Woodforde	4	7	3
(Australia) D Cahill (Australia) S Youl	6	6	6
(Australia) L Warder (United States) B Willenborg	6	6
8	(New Zealand) K Evernden (United States) J Kriek	4	3

Third round
1	(United States) K Flach (United States) R Seguso	7	7
15	(Australia) P Doohan (United States) J Grabb	6	5
(Australia) D Cahill (Australia) S Youl	6	4	4
(Australia) L Warder (United States) B Willenborg	4	6	6

Quarterfinals
1	(United States) K Flach (United States) R Seguso	6	6	1	6
(Australia) L Warder (United States) B Willenborg	3	4	6	2

==== Section 2 ====
First round
4	(United States) K Curren (United States) D Pate	7	6
(Austria) T Muster (Austria) H Skoff	6	2
(Australia) C Limberger (Switzerland) C Mezzadri
(West Germany) E Jelen (West Germany) P Kühnen	w/o
(United States) M Basham (United States) C Beckman	7	3	6
(Brazil) D Marcelino (Brazil) M Menezes	6	6	7
(United States) A Kohlberg (United States) R Van't Hof	6	7
13	(Canada) G Connell (Canada) G Michibata	3	6
11	(France) G Forget (France) H Leconte	6	6
(United States) S DeVries (United States) R Matuszewski	2	4
(South Africa) E Edwards (South Africa) G Muller	6	6	6
LL	(Canada) M Laurendeau (Netherlands) M Oosting	7	4	7
(West Germany) U Riglewski (Czechoslovakia) M Vajda	6	3	2
(Spain) T Carbonell (Spain) J Sánchez	3	6	6
(United States) S Stewart (Australia) K Warwick	2	2
5	(United States) R Leach (United States) J Pugh	6	6

Second round
4	(United States) K Curren (United States) D Pate	6	6
(West Germany) E Jelen (West Germany) P Kühnen	3	4
(Brazil) D Marcelino (Brazil) M Menezes	6	5	4
(United States) A Kohlberg (United States) R Van't Hof	2	7	6
11	(France) G Forget (France) H Leconte	w/o
LL	(Canada) M Laurendeau (Netherlands) M Oosting
(Spain) T Carbonell (Spain) J Sánchez	2	5
5	(United States) R Leach (United States) J Pugh	6	7

Third round
4	(United States) K Curren (United States) D Pate	4	7	7
(United States) A Kohlberg (United States) R Van't Hof	6	6	6
11	(France) G Forget (France) H Leconte	7	3	6
5	(United States) R Leach (United States) J Pugh	6	6	7

Quarterfinals
4	(United States) K Curren (United States) D Pate	1	7	3	2
5	(United States) R Leach (United States) J Pugh	6	6	6	6

=== Bottom half ===
==== Section 3 ====
First round
6	(Ecuador) A Gómez (Sweden) A Järryd	6	6	6
(United States) K Jones (Denmark) M Mortensen	3	7	1
(United States) L Jensen (United States) B Pearce	6	6
(United States) R Baxter (United States) T Siegel	2	3
(United States) C Hooper (United States) L Scott	4	4
(Mexico) L Lavalle (Mexico) A Moreno	6	6
(United States) D Dowlen (United States) M Freeman	6	6	6
12	(United States) P Annacone (United States) P McEnroe	7	1	7
14	(United States) S Davis (Switzerland) J Hlasek	6	6
(United States) J Palmer (United States) P Sampras	4	2
(United States) J Berger (United States) R Reneberg	4	6
(United States) M Anger (United States) G Holmes	6	7
(Italy) O Camporese (Italy) D Nargiso	6	6	2
(Sweden) N Kroon (Sweden) J Svensson	4	3
(Chile) R Acuña (United States) G Layendecker	2	7	4
3	(Spain) S Casal (Spain) E Sánchez	6	6	6

Second round
6	(Ecuador) A Gómez (Sweden) A Järryd	6	6
(United States) L Jensen (United States) B Pearce	1	4
(Mexico) L Lavalle (Mexico) A Moreno	3	3
12	(United States) P Annacone (United States) P McEnroe	6	6
14	(United States) S Davis (Switzerland) J Hlasek	6	6	6
(United States) M Anger (United States) G Holmes	4	7	4
(Italy) O Camporese (Italy) D Nargiso	7	4	4
3	(Spain) S Casal (Spain) E Sánchez	6	6	6

Third round
6	(Ecuador) A Gómez (Sweden) A Järryd	7	3	4
12	(United States) P Annacone (United States) P McEnroe	5	6	6
14	(United States) S Davis (Switzerland) J Hlasek	3	7	4
3	(Spain) S Casal (Spain) E Sánchez	6	5	6

Quarterfinals
12	(United States) P Annacone (United States) P McEnroe	4	4	7	7	6
3	(Spain) S Casal (Spain) E Sánchez	6	6	5	6	7

==== Section 4 ====
First round
7	(South Africa) P Aldrich (South Africa) D Visser	4	3
(United States) E Korita (United States) J Levine	6	6
(United States) M De Palmer (United States) G Donnelly	6	6	6
(United States) M Davis (United States) T Pawsat	7	3	1
(United States) L Shiras (United States) J Rive	6	6
(Japan) S Matsuoka (Nigeria) T Mmoh	3	4
(United States) B Garrow (United States) P Galbraith	3	6
9	(Czechoslovakia) M Mečíř (Czechoslovakia) T Šmíd	6	7
16	(Sweden) J Nyström (Sweden) M Pernfors	6	6
(United States) H Endelman (United States) P Palandjian	2	4
(United States) D DiLucia (United States) J Stark	2	3
(United States) M Flur (United States) S Giammalva	6	6
(The Bahamas) R Smith (Kenya) P Wekesa	3	2
(United States) B Farrow (United States) G Van Emburgh	6	6
(United Kingdom) D Felgate (Poland) W Kowalski	2	1
2	(Mexico) J Lozano (United States) T Witsken	6	6

Second round
(United States) E Korita (United States) J Levine	6	6
(United States) M De Palmer (United States) G Donnelly	4	3
(United States) L Shiras (United States) J Rive	7	3	4
9	(Czechoslovakia) M Mečíř (Czechoslovakia) T Šmíd	6	6	6
16	(Sweden) J Nyström (Sweden) M Pernfors	2	4
(United States) M Flur (United States) S Giammalva	6	6
(United States) B Farrow (United States) G Van Emburgh	1	3
2	(Mexico) J Lozano (United States) T Witsken	6	6

Third round
(United States) E Korita (United States) J Levine	6	6
9	(Czechoslovakia) M Mečíř (Czechoslovakia) T Šmíd	4	4
(United States) M Flur (United States) S Giammalva	6	6
2	(Mexico) J Lozano (United States) T Witsken	7	7

Quarterfinals
(United States) E Korita (United States) J Levine	6	5	3	7	4
2	(Mexico) J Lozano (United States) T Witsken	2	7	6	6	6
