= 1985 Melbourne Outdoor – Singles =

Singles
- 1985 Melbourne Outdoor

Final
- Champion: (United States) Jonathan Canter
- Runner-up: (Australia) Peter Doohan
- Score: 5–7, 6–3, 6–4

Details
- Draw: 32 (3WC/4Q/1LL)
- Seeds: 8

Events
Singles	Doubles
← 1984 ·	Melbourne Outdoor

Dan Cassidy was the defending champion, but did not compete this year.

Jonathan Canter won the title by defeating Peter Doohan 5–7, 6–3, 6–4 in the final.

== Seeds ==
1. (n/a)
2. (United States) Jonathan Canter (champion)
3. (South Africa) Christo Steyn (second round)
4. (Netherlands) Michiel Schapers (second round)
5. (West Germany) Ricki Osterthun (first round)
6. (Australia) Peter Doohan (final)
7. (n/a)
8. (New Zealand) Russell Simpson (first round)

== Draw ==
=== Key ===
- Q = Qualifier
- WC = Wild card
- LL = Lucky loser
- Alt = Alternate
- SE = Special exempt
- PR = Protected ranking
- ITF = ITF entry
- JE = Junior exempt
- w/o = Walkover
- r = Retired
- d = Defaulted
- SR = Special ranking

=== Finals ===
Semifinals
6	(Australia) Peter Doohan	6	6
WC	(Australia) Mark Kratzmann	4	3
WC	(Australia) Mark Edmondson	6	6
2	(United States) Jonathan Canter	7	7

Final
6	(Australia) Peter Doohan	7	3	4
2	(United States) Jonathan Canter	5	6	6

=== Top half ===
First round
(South Africa) M Robertson	4	7	6
(Argentina) R Saad	6	6	1
(France) T Benhabiles	4	5
WC	(Australia) S Barr	6	7
(Australia) B Drewett	6	6	7
(United States) M Bauer	1	7	6
(Australia) D Cahill	4	4
6	(Australia) P Doohan	6	6
3	(South Africa) C Steyn	6	6
(United Kingdom) C Dowdeswell	3	1
WC	(Australia) M Kratzmann	6	6
(Paraguay) F González	3	4
(United States) B Scanlon	6	6
Q	(Germany) E Jelen	3	3
(Australia) M Woodforde	6	6
8	(New Zealand) R Simpson	3	3

Second round
(South Africa) M Robertson	6	4	6
WC	(Australia) S Barr	1	6	3
(Australia) B Drewett	2	7	5
6	(Australia) P Doohan	6	6	7
3	(South Africa) C Steyn	5	7	2
WC	(Australia) M Kratzmann	7	6	6
(United States) B Scanlon	6	7
(Australia) M Woodforde	3	5

Quarterfinals
(South Africa) M Robertson	5	1
6	(Australia) P Doohan	7	6
WC	(Australia) M Kratzmann	6	6
(United States) B Scanlon	3	4

Semifinals
6	(Australia) P Doohan	6	6
WC	(Australia) M Kratzmann	4	3

=== Bottom half ===
First round
5	(West Germany) R Osterthun	2	3
(Brazil) N Aerts	6	6
(South Africa) E Edwards	4	6	3
LL	(Australia) C Limberger	6	3	2^{r}
WC	(Australia) M Edmondson	4	6	6
Q	(South Africa) G Muller	6	3	4
(United States) L Shiras	6	6	4
4	(Netherlands) M Schapers	4	7	6
Q	(New Zealand) B Derlin	6	0	3
(Australia) B Dyke	2	6	6
(Sweden) P Carlsson	6	6
(Canada) S Bonneau	4	3
Q	(France) T Champion	6	6
(West Germany) T Meinecke	2	4
(South Africa) D Visser	5	3
2	(United States) J Canter	7	6

Second round
(Brazil) N Aerts	6	3
(South Africa) E Edwards	7	6
WC	(Australia) M Edmondson	6	6
4	(Netherlands) M Schapers	4	2
(Australia) B Dyke	6	6	6
(Sweden) P Carlsson	4	7	4
Q	(France) T Champion	6	0
2	(United States) J Canter	7	6

Quarterfinals
(South Africa) E Edwards	3	6	5
WC	(Australia) M Edmondson	6	3	7
(Australia) B Dyke	2	3
2	(United States) J Canter	6	6

Semifinals
WC	(Australia) M Edmondson	6	6
2	(United States) J Canter	7	7
