= 1985 Melbourne Outdoor =

- Date: 23–29 December
- Edition: 3rd
- Category: Grand Prix
- Draw: 32S / 16D
- Prize money: $80,000
- Surface: Grass / outdoor
- Location: Melbourne, Australia

Champions

Singles
- (United States) Jonathan Canter

Doubles
- (Australia) Darren Cahill / (Australia) Peter Carter
← 1984 ·	Melbourne Outdoor

The 1985 Melbourne Outdoor, also known as the 1985 Jason Victorian Open, was a Grand Prix tournament held in Melbourne, Australia. It was the third edition of the tournament and was held from 23 to 29 December and was played on outdoor grass courts. Second-seeded Jonathan Canter won the singles title.

== Finals ==
=== Singles ===
(United States) Jonathan Canter defeated (Australia) Peter Doohan 5–7, 6–3, 6–4

- It was Canter's only singles title of his career.

=== Doubles ===
(Australia) Darren Cahill / (Australia) Peter Carter defeated (United States) Brett Dickinson / (Argentina) Roberto Saad 7–6^{(7–3)}, 6–1
