= 1988 US Open – Mixed doubles =

Mixed doubles
- 1988 US Open

Final
- Champions: (Czechoslovakia) Jana Novotná (United States) Jim Pugh
- Runners-up: (Australia) Elizabeth Smylie (United States) Patrick McEnroe
- Score: 7–5, 6–3

Details
- Draw: 32
- Seeds: 8

Events
| Singles | men | women | | boys | girls |
| Doubles | men | women | mixed | boys | girls |
| WC Singles | men | women | quad |
| WC Doubles | men | women | quad |
| Legends | men | women | mixed |
- US Open

Martina Navratilova and Emilio Sánchez were the defending champions but did not compete that year.

Jana Novotná and Jim Pugh won in the final 7–5, 6–3 against Elizabeth Smylie and Patrick McEnroe.

== Seeds ==
Champion seeds are indicated in bold text while text in italics indicates the round in which those seeds were eliminated.

1. (United States) Lori McNeil / (Mexico) Jorge Lozano (first round)
2. (Czechoslovakia) **Jana Novotná** / (United States) **Jim Pugh (champions)**
3. (Australia) Elizabeth Smylie / (United States) Patrick McEnroe (final)
4. (United States) Patty Fendick / (United States) Rick Leach (second round)
5. (France) Catherine Suire / (Australia) Mark Woodforde (first round)
6. (United States) Betsy Nagelsen / (United States) Paul Annacone (second round)
7. (United States) Robin White / (United States) Kelly Jones (first round)
8. (United States) Zina Garrison / (United States) Sherwood Stewart (quarterfinals)

== Draw ==
Key

- Q = Qualifier
- WC = Wild card
- LL = Lucky loser
- Alt = Alternate
- ITF = ITF entry
- PR = Protected ranking
- SR = Special ranking
- SE = Special exempt
- JE = Junior exempt
- JR = Junior Accelerator Programme entrant
- CO = College Accelerator Programme entrant
- NG = Next Gen Accelerator Program entrant
- w/o = Walkover
- r = Retired
- d = Defaulted

=== Final ===
| Final |
| 3 | (Australia) Elizabeth Smylie (United States) Patrick McEnroe | 5 | 3 |
| 2 | (Czechoslovakia) **Jana Novotná** (United States) **Jim Pugh** | **7** | **6** |

=== Top half ===
First round
1 | (United States) L McNeil (Mexico) J Lozano
(United States) **T Austin** (United States) **K Flach** | w/o
(United States) M L Daniels (United States) R Van't Hof | 1 | 4
(United States) **R Reis** (United States) **L Jensen** | **6** | **6**
(United States) **G Fernández** (Mexico) **A Moreno** | 3 | **6** | **6**
(United States) A Henricksson (Netherlands) M Schapers | **6** | 2 | 2
(Australia) J Tremelling (Australia) L Warder | 3 | **6** | 5
8 | (United States) **Z Garrison** (United States) **S Stewart** | **6** | 4 | **7**
3 | (Australia) **E Smylie** (United States) **P McEnroe** | **7** | 3 | **6**
(United States) P Barg (United States) E Korita | 5 | **6** | 2
(United States) **A Smith** (Australia) **K Warwick** | 2 | **7** | **6**
(Australia) W Turnbull (United Kingdom) J Lloyd | **6** | 6 | 2
(South Africa) **M Reinach** (South Africa) **D Visser** | **6** | **6**
(United States) G Magers (United States) J Levine | 4 | 4
(Argentina) **M Paz** (Mexico) **L Lavalle** | **6** | 3 | **6**
5 | (France) C Suire (Australia) M Woodforde | 3 | **6** | 2

Second round
(United States) **T Austin** (United States) **K Flach** | **6** | **6**
(United States) R Reis (United States) L Jensen | 4 | 4
(United States) G Fernández (Mexico) A Moreno | 4 | 2
8 | (United States) **Z Garrison** (United States) **S Stewart** | **6** | **6**
3 | (Australia) **E Smylie** (United States) **P McEnroe** | **6** | **6**
(United States) A Smith (Australia) K Warwick | 4 | 2
(South Africa) M Reinach (South Africa) D Visser | 5 | 4
(Argentina) **M Paz** (Mexico) **L Lavalle** | **7** | **6**

Quarterfinals
(United States) **T Austin** (United States) **K Flach** | **7** | **7**
8 | (United States) Z Garrison (United States) S Stewart | 5 | 5
3 | (Australia) **E Smylie** (United States) **P McEnroe** | **7** | **6**
(Argentina) M Paz (Mexico) L Lavalle | 6 | 3

Semifinals
(United States) T Austin (United States) K Flach | 2 | 1
3 | (Australia) **E Smylie** (United States) **P McEnroe** | **6** | **6**

=== Bottom half ===
First round
6 | (United States) **B Nagelsen** (United States) **P Annacone** | **6** | **6**
(United States) T Phelps (United States) B Willenborg | 3 | 4
(United States) B Herr (United States) T Pawsat | 6 | **6** | 1
(South Africa) **R Fairbank** (Australia) **T Woodbridge** | **7** | 2 | **6**
(United States) **M McGrath** (United States) **S Davis** | **7** | **6**
(United States) C Reynolds (United States) M Davis | 5 | 3
(Spain) A Sánchez (Italy) D Nargiso | **7** | 6 | 3
4 | (United States) **P Fendick** (United States) **R Leach** | 6 | **7** | **6**
7 | (United States) R White (United States) K Jones | **7** | 6 | 4
(Canada) **C Bassett-Seguso** (United States) **R Seguso** | 6 | **7** | **6**
(Australia) J Byrne (United States) P Fleming | **6** | 3 | 4
(South Africa) **E Reinach** (South Africa) **E Edwards** | 4 | **6** | **6**
(West Germany) C Porwik (Australia) D Cahill | 1 | 5
(South Africa) **D van Rensburg** (United States) **S Giammalva Jr.** | **6** | **7**
(United States) E Burgin (United States) D Goldie | 5 | 4
2 | (Czechoslovakia) **J Novotná** (United States) **J Pugh** | **7** | **6**

Second round
6 | (United States) B Nagelsen (United States) P Annacone | **6** | 6 | 5
(South Africa) **R Fairbank** (Australia) **T Woodbridge** | 3 | **7** | **7**
(United States) **M McGrath** (United States) **S Davis** | **6** | **6**
4 | (United States) P Fendick (United States) R Leach | 4 | 2
(Canada) C Bassett-Seguso (United States) R Seguso | 2 | 6
(South Africa) **E Reinach** (South Africa) **E Edwards** | **6** | **7**
(South Africa) D van Rensburg (United States) S Giammalva Jr. | **7** | 5 | 6
2 | (Czechoslovakia) **J Novotná** (United States) **J Pugh** | 5 | **7** | **7**

Quarterfinals
(South Africa) **R Fairbank** (Australia) **T Woodbridge** | 3 | **7** | **6**
(United States) M McGrath (United States) S Davis | **6** | 6 | 4
(South Africa) E Reinach (South Africa) E Edwards | 2 | 6
2 | (Czechoslovakia) **J Novotná** (United States) **J Pugh** | **6** | **7**

Semifinals
(South Africa) R Fairbank (Australia) T Woodbridge | 2 | 3
2 | (Czechoslovakia) **J Novotná** (United States) **J Pugh** | **6** | **6**
