= 1988 Seoul Open – Doubles =

Doubles
- 1988 Seoul Open

Final
- Champions: (United Kingdom) Andrew Castle (Argentina) Roberto Saad
- Runners-up: (United States) Gary Donnelly (United States) Jim Grabb
- Score: 6–7, 6–4, 7–6

Details
- Draw: 16
- Seeds: 4

Events
| Singles | Doubles |
| ← 1987 · | Seoul Open | · 1989 → |

Eric Korita and Mike Leach were the defending champions, but did not participate together this year. Korita partnered Brad Pearce, losing in the first round. Leach did not participate this year.

Andrew Castle and Roberto Saad won in the final 6–7, 6–4, 7–6, against Gary Donnelly and Jim Grabb.

== Seeds ==
1. (Australia) Brad Drewett / (Australia) John Fitzgerald (first round)
2. (United States) Gary Donnelly / (United States) Jim Grabb (final)
3. (United States) Andy Kohlberg / (United States) Robert Van't Hof (semifinals)
4. (United States) Kelly Jones / (United States) Tim Pawsat (semifinals)

== Draw ==
=== Key ===
- Q = Qualifier
- WC = Wild card
- LL = Lucky loser
- Alt = Alternate
- ITF = ITF entry
- PR = Protected ranking
- SR = Special ranking
- SE = Special exempt
- JE = Junior exempt
- JR = Junior Accelerator Programme entrant
- CO = College Accelerator Programme entrant
- NG = Next Gen Accelerator Program entrant
- w/o = Walkover
- r = Retired
- d = Defaulted

=== Draw ===
First round
1 | (Australia) B Drewett (Australia) J Fitzgerald | 3 | 4
(United Kingdom) A Castle (Argentina) R Saad | 6 | 6
(United States) P Palandjian (West Germany) W Popp | 6 | 6
(United States) J Rive (United States) L Shiras | 7 | 7
4 | (United States) K Jones (United States) T Pawsat | 6 | 6
(United States) E Korita (United States) B Pearce | 2 | 3
(South Korea) B-S Kim (South Korea) J-S Yoo | 6 | 3 | 7
(United States) G Layendecker (United States) J Letts | 4 | 6 | 6
(United States) S Denton (United States) D Goldie | 6 | 7 | 7
(United States) P Chamberlin (United States) L Scott | 7 | 5 | 6
(Australia) J Frawley (Australia) S Youl | 6 | 5
3 | (United States) A Kohlberg (United States) R Van't Hof | 7 | 7
(United States) M Anger (United States) G Holmes | 6 | 6
(United States) B Scanlon (United States) T Siegel | 4 | 1
(United States) T Nelson (The Bahamas) R Smith | 3 | 5
2 | (United States) G Donnelly (United States) J Grabb | 6 | 7

Quarterfinals
(United Kingdom) A Castle (Argentina) R Saad | 7 | 7
(United States) J Rive (United States) L Shiras | 6 | 6
4 | (United States) K Jones (United States) T Pawsat | 6 | 3 | 7
(South Korea) B-S Kim (South Korea) J-S Yoo | 1 | 6 | 6
(United States) S Denton (United States) D Goldie | 6 | 6 | 6
3 | (United States) A Kohlberg (United States) R Van't Hof | 3 | 7 | 7
(United States) M Anger (United States) G Holmes | 6 | 4 | 2
2 | (United States) G Donnelly (United States) J Grabb | 4 | 6 | 6

Semifinals
(United Kingdom) A Castle (Argentina) R Saad | 3 | 7 | 6
4 | (United States) K Jones (United States) T Pawsat | 6 | 6 | 2
3 | (United States) A Kohlberg (United States) R Van't Hof | 6 | 6
2 | (United States) G Donnelly (United States) J Grabb | 7 | 7

Final
(United Kingdom) A Castle (Argentina) R Saad | 6 | 6 | 7
2 | (United States) G Donnelly (United States) J Grabb | 7 | 4 | 6
