= 1988 Seoul Open =

- Date: 18–25 April
- Edition: 2nd
- Category: Grand Prix
- Draw: 32S / 16D
- Prize money: $93,400
- Surface: Hard / outdoor
- Location: Seoul, South Korea

Champions

Singles
- (United States) Dan Goldie

Doubles
- (United Kingdom) Andrew Castle / (Argentina) Roberto Saad
← 1987 ·	Seoul Open	· 1989 →

The 1988 Seoul Open was a men's tennis tournament played on outdoor hard courts that was part of the 1988 Nabisco Grand Prix circuit. It was the second edition of the tournament and was played at Seoul in South Korea from 18 April through 25 April 1988. Fifth-seeded Dan Goldie won the singles title.

== Finals ==
=== Singles ===
(United States) Dan Goldie defeated (United Kingdom) Andrew Castle 6–3, 6–7^{(5–7)}, 6–0

- It was Goldie's only singles title of the year and the 2nd and last of his career.

=== Doubles ===
(United Kingdom) Andrew Castle / (Argentina) Roberto Saad defeated (United States) Gary Donnelly / (United States) Jim Grabb 6–7, 6–4, 7–6

- It was Castle's 1st title of the year and the 1st of his career. It was Saad's only title of the year and the 1st of his career.
