= 1988 US Open – Men's singles =

Men's singles
- 1988 US Open

Final
- Champion: (Sweden) Mats Wilander
- Runner-up: (Czechoslovakia) Ivan Lendl
- Score: 6–4, 4–6, 6–3, 5–7, 6–4

Details
- Draw: 128
- Seeds: 16

Events
Singles	men	women		boys	girls
Doubles	men	women	mixed	boys	girls
WC Singles	men	women	quad
WC Doubles	men	women	quad
Legends	men	women	mixed
- US Open

Mats Wilander defeated three-time defending champion Ivan Lendl in a rematch of the previous year's final, 6–4, 4–6, 6–3, 5–7, 6–4 to win the men's singles tennis title at the 1988 US Open. It was his first US Open singles title and seventh and last major singles title overall. It was the longest US Open men's singles final in history, lasting 4 hours and 54 minutes. With the win, Wilander gained the world No. 1 singles ranking for the first time, displacing Lendl.

By virtue of this title, Wilander became the first man in the Open Era to win multiple grand slam titles on hard, clay, and grass courts. It would be more than 2 decades before Rafael Nadal joined him, both reaching the milestone at 24 years old. In 2025, Carlos Alcaraz became the first player to reach this milestone before turning 24.

Aged 15 years and 2 months, Tommy Ho was the youngest man in the Open Era to appear in the main draw of a major. He lost in the first round to Johan Kriek.

This tournament marked the first major main draw appearances of two future world No. 1s: future 14-time major champion Pete Sampras and future four-time major champion Jim Courier.

== Seeds ==
The seeded players are listed below. Mats Wilander is the champion; others show the round in which they were eliminated.

1. (Czechoslovakia) Ivan Lendl (finalist)
2. (Sweden) Mats Wilander (champion)
3. (Sweden) Stefan Edberg (fourth round)
4. (United States) Andre Agassi (semifinalist)
5. (West Germany) Boris Becker (second round)
6. (United States) Jimmy Connors (quarterfinalist)
7. (France) Yannick Noah (second round)
8. (Czechoslovakia) Miloslav Mečíř (third round)
9. (United States) Tim Mayotte (third round)
10. (France) Henri Leconte (third round)
11. (United States) Brad Gilbert (second round)
12. (Argentina) Guillermo Pérez Roldán (third round)
13. (Sweden) Jonas Svensson (second round)
14. (Ecuador) Andrés Gómez (third round)
15. (Sweden) Anders Järryd (third round)
16. (United States) John McEnroe (second round)

== Draw ==
Key

- Q = Qualifier
- WC = Wild card
- LL = Lucky loser
- Alt = Alternate
- ITF = ITF entry
- PR = Protected ranking
- SR = Special ranking
- SE = Special exempt
- JE = Junior exempt
- JR = Junior Accelerator Programme entrant
- CO = College Accelerator Programme entrant
- NG = Next Gen Accelerator Program entrant
- w/o = Walkover
- r = Retired
- d = Defaulted

=== Finals ===
Quarterfinals
1	(Czechoslovakia) Ivan Lendl	6	6	6
(United States) Derrick Rostagno	2	2	0
4	(United States) Andre Agassi	6	7^{8}	6
6	(United States) Jimmy Connors	2	6^{6}	1
(Australia) Darren Cahill	6	5	7^{7}	5	6
(United States) Aaron Krickstein	2	7	6^{2}	7	3
(Spain) Emilio Sánchez	6	6^{6}	0	4
2	(Sweden) Mats Wilander	3	7^{8}	6	6

Semifinals
1	(Czechoslovakia) Ivan Lendl	4	6	6	6
4	(United States) Andre Agassi	6	2	3	4
(Australia) Darren Cahill	4	4	2
2	(Sweden) Mats Wilander	6	6	6

Final
1	(Czechoslovakia) Ivan Lendl	4	6	3	7	4
2	(Sweden) Mats Wilander	6	4	6	5	6

=== Top half ===
==== Section 1 ====
First round
1	(Czechoslovakia) I Lendl	6	6^{3}	6	5	6
(Israel) A Mansdorf	2	7^{7}	1	7	0
(United States) J Berger	6	6	6
Q	(United States) D Cassidy	4	0	2
Q	(United States) J Brown	6	4	6	7
(United States) D Goldie	4	6	3	6
(United Kingdom) J Bates	4	3	1
WC	(United States) S Davis	6	6	6
(Australia) W Masur	6	6	6
Q	(The Bahamas) R Smith	2	3	4
(Switzerland) J Hlasek	6	6	4	6
(Italy) C Pistolesi	2	2	6	3
(United States) R Reneberg	6	4	6	6
(Czechoslovakia) M Vajda	3	6	4	0
(Sweden) J Nyström	3	6	3	2
15	(Sweden) A Järryd	6	4	6	6

Second round
1	(Czechoslovakia) I Lendl	6	6	6
(United States) J Berger	2	4	1
Q	(United States) J Brown	3	3	6	3
WC	(United States) S Davis	6	6	3	6
(Australia) W Masur	0	3	0
(Switzerland) J Hlasek	6	6	6
(United States) R Reneberg	3	5	4
15	(Sweden) A Järryd	6	7	6

Third round
1	(Czechoslovakia) I Lendl	6	6	6
WC	(United States) S Davis	1	4	3
(Switzerland) J Hlasek	6	6	6
15	(Sweden) A Järryd	3	4	2

Fourth round
1	(Czechoslovakia) I Lendl	6	5	6	6
(Switzerland) J Hlasek	4	7	2	4

==== Section 2 ====
First round
9	(United States) T Mayotte	6	6	4	5	6
(United States) J Pugh	3	4	6	7	3
Q	(Italy) G Pozzi	3	6	6	6
(Sweden) P Lundgren	6	3	2	3
(Brazil) C Motta	7	6	3	4	4
(United States) M Davis	5	3	6	6	6
(United States) D Rostagno	6	6	6	7
(Senegal) Y Doumbia	3	7	3	6
Q	(United States) J Palmer	2	4	6	6	6
WC	(United States) J Tarango	6	6	2	4	0
(New Zealand) K Evernden	1	6	3	6	1
(Haiti) R Agénor	6	3	6	3	6
(Australia) J Stoltenberg	6	4	6	6	6
(United States) M Anger	7	6	3	4	4
Q	(United States) K Jones	6	4	1
7	(France) Y Noah	7	6	6

Second round
9	(United States) T Mayotte	7	6	6
Q	(Italy) G Pozzi	6	4	3
(United States) M Davis	4	4	3
(United States) D Rostagno	6	6	6
Q	(United States) J Palmer	4	4	3
(Haiti) R Agénor	6	6	6
(Australia) J Stoltenberg	6	6	5
7	(France) Y Noah	2	7	1r

Third round
9	(United States) T Mayotte	3	4	2
(United States) D Rostagno	6	6	6
(Haiti) R Agénor	6	2	6	4	6
(Australia) J Stoltenberg	3	6	4	6	3

Fourth round
(United States) D Rostagno	6	3	6	6
(Haiti) R Agénor	2	6	1	3

==== Section 3 ====
First round
4	(United States) A Agassi	7	6	6
Q	(United States) P Johnson	6	3	3
WC	(United States) S Melville	7	5	1	6
WC	(United States) R Leach	6	7	6	7
(Argentina) M Jaite	6	6	1	6
(France) T Champion	1	4	6	0
WC	(United States) T Ho	4	6	6
(United States) J Kriek	6	7	7
(United Kingdom) A Castle	1	7	2	5
(Switzerland) C Mezzadri	6	5	6	7
(West Germany) R Osterthun	6	2	1	2
(United States) T Wilkison	3	6	6	6
(United States) M Chang	6	6	7
(Brazil) L Mattar	4	3	5
(United States) T Witsken	3	3	4
13	(Sweden) J Svensson	6	6	6

Second round
4	(United States) A Agassi	4	6	6	6
WC	(United States) R Leach	6	2	3	4
(Argentina) M Jaite	4	2	6	6
(United States) J Kriek	6	6	3	7
(Switzerland) C Mezzadri	6	2	2
(United States) T Wilkison	7	6	6
(United States) M Chang	5	6	2	6	6
13	(Sweden) J Svensson	7	4	6	1	4

Third round
4	(United States) A Agassi	6	6	2	6
(United States) J Kriek	3	1	6	0
(United States) T Wilkison	6	6	3	4	5
(United States) M Chang	4	3	6	6	7

Fourth round
4	(United States) A Agassi	7	6	6
(United States) M Chang	5	3	2

==== Section 4 ====
First round
12	(Argentina) G Pérez Roldán	6	7	3	6	7
(United States) K Flach	7	6	6	1	6
WC	(United States) J Ross	7	6	4	6
(France) J-P Fleurian	6	4	6	1
(Mexico) J Lozano	6	7	3	7
(United States) J Grabb	2	5	6	5
(United States) M Kures	3	4	3
(United States) R Seguso	6	6	6
(South Africa) P Aldrich	7	6	6
(Poland) W Kowalski	5	3	4
(Sweden) C Bergström	6	3	2	6	4
Q	(Canada) G Connell	3	6	6	3	6
(Czechoslovakia) P Korda	6	4	0	r
(Israel) G Bloom	4	6	3
(Mexico) A Moreno	3	2	2
6	(United States) J Connors	6	6	6

Second round
12	(Argentina) G Pérez Roldán	6	6	5	6	6
WC	(United States) J Ross	4	4	7	7	3
(Mexico) J Lozano	7	6	2	6	6
(United States) R Seguso	5	0	6	7	4
(South Africa) P Aldrich	7	6	6
Q	(Canada) G Connell	6	4	3
(Israel) G Bloom	0	3	6	1
6	(United States) J Connors	6	6	3	6

Third round
12	(Argentina) G Pérez Roldán	4	4	7	6
(Mexico) J Lozano	6	6	5	7
(South Africa) P Aldrich	3	2	3
6	(United States) J Connors	6	6	6

Fourth round
(Mexico) J Lozano	1	2	0
6	(United States) J Connors	6	6	6

=== Bottom half ===
==== Section 5 ====
First round
5	(West Germany) B Becker	6	6	7
(United States) T Nelson	3	0	6
(United States) L Duncan	0	2	2
(Australia) D Cahill	6	6	6
(Argentina) H de la Peña	3	6	6	6	2
(Argentina) M Ingaramo	6	3	3	7	6
(West Germany) U Riglewski	2	6	6	2
Q	(South Africa) A Burrow	6	4	7	6
Q	(South Africa) M Robertson	3	6	3
(Netherlands) M Oosting	6	7	6
Q	(Canada) M Laurendeau	2	6	7	7
(United States) J Arias	6	4	6	6
WC	(United States) P Sampras	7	7	4	5	2
(Peru) J Yzaga	6	6	6	7	6
(Czechoslovakia) M Šrejber	3	3	2
11	(United States) B Gilbert	6	6	6

Second round
5	(West Germany) B Becker	3	3	2
(Australia) D Cahill	6	6	6
(Argentina) M Ingaramo	7	6	3	6
Q	(South Africa) A Burrow	6	1	6	2
(Netherlands) M Oosting	3	3	2
Q	(Canada) M Laurendeau	6	6	6
(Peru) J Yzaga	1	6	6	6
11	(United States) B Gilbert	6	0	4	2

Third round
(Australia) D Cahill
(Argentina) M Ingaramo	w/o
Q	(Canada) M Laurendeau	4	6	6	7
(Peru) J Yzaga	6	2	4	5

Fourth round
(Australia) D Cahill	6	6	6
Q	(Canada) M Laurendeau	4	4	3

==== Section 6 ====
First round
14	(Ecuador) A Gómez	6	6	6
(Spain) J Sánchez	4	2	2
(Japan) S Matsuoka	3	6	6	6
(Australia) S Youl	6	4	3	2
(United States) A Krickstein	7	6	6
(Netherlands) M Schapers	5	3	2
(United States) D Pate	4	6	6	6
(West Germany) E Jelen	6	1	4	2
(Sweden) T Svantesson	0	4	6	7	6
(Spain) T Carbonell	6	6	1	6	4
Q	(Sweden) J Carlsson	6	6	6
(Socialist Federal Republic of Yugoslavia) S Živojinović	0	4	4
(France) G Forget	5	6	6	6
(France) T Tulasne	7	4	3	4
Q	(Belgium) L Pimek	2	2	4
3	(Sweden) S Edberg	6	6	6

Second round
14	(Ecuador) A Gómez	7	2	6	2	6
(Japan) S Matsuoka	6	6	4	6	2
(United States) A Krickstein	3	6	6	6
(United States) D Pate	6	2	4	3
(Sweden) T Svantesson	2	3	0
Q	(Sweden) J Carlsson	6	6	6
(France) G Forget	5	1	3
3	(Sweden) S Edberg	7	6	6

Third round
14	(Ecuador) A Gómez	4	6	4	4
(United States) A Krickstein	6	4	6	6
Q	(Sweden) J Carlsson	0	5	2
3	(Sweden) S Edberg	6	7	6

Fourth round
(United States) A Krickstein	5	7	7	4	7
3	(Sweden) S Edberg	7	6	6	6	5

==== Section 7 ====
First round
8	(Czechoslovakia) M Mečíř	7	6	6
(Czechoslovakia) T Šmid	5	4	0
(United States) S Giammalva, Jr.	6	6	7
Q	(Puerto Rico) M Nido	4	3	6
(Spain) E Sánchez	6	6	6
(Spain) S Casal	3	4	2
Q	(Portugal) N Marques	4	7	6	5	1
(India) R Krishnan	6	5	3	7	6
(United States) P Annacone	6	6	2	6
(Italy) M Narducci	4	3	6	3
(Australia) J Frawley	5	6	6	6
(United States) J Rive	7	3	0	3
(United States) L Shiras	3	4	7	6	2
LL	(South Africa) B Moir	6	6	5	0	6
(Argentina) J Frana	4	6	3	4
10	(France) H Leconte	6	3	6	6

Second round
8	(Czechoslovakia) M Mečíř	6	6	7
(United States) S Giammalva, Jr.	4	1	6
(Spain) E Sánchez	6	7	6
(India) R Krishnan	2	5	2
(United States) P Annacone	4	6	6	3	6
(Australia) J Frawley	6	3	4	6	7
LL	(South Africa) B Moir	0	4	4
10	(France) H Leconte	6	6	6

Third round
8	(Czechoslovakia) M Mečíř	3	6	6	1
(Spain) E Sánchez	6	3	7	6
(Australia) J Frawley	6	6	6
10	(France) H Leconte	3	4	3

Fourth round
(Spain) E Sánchez	6	6	6
(Australia) J Frawley	2	3	4

==== Section 8 ====
First round
16	(United States) J McEnroe	6	6	6
Q	(Mexico) L Lavalle	3	4	4
(Belgium) E Masso	3	0	7	6	3
(Australia) M Woodforde	6	6	6	1	6
(Sweden) N Kroon	4	6	5	2
(West Germany) P Kühnen	6	2	7	6
(Italy) D Nargiso	7	7	7
(Canada) C Pridham	5	6	6
(Austria) T Muster	6	2	6	1
(Sweden) M Pernfors	7	6	3	6
(United States) J Courier	7	6	6
(Austria) H Skoff	5	4	3
(United States) K Curren	6	6	6
WC	(United States) R Weiss	4	4	4
(United States) G Holmes	2	1	4
2	(Sweden) M Wilander	6	6	6

Second round
16	(United States) J McEnroe	5	6	7	3	1
(Australia) M Woodforde	7	4	6	6	6
(West Germany) P Kühnen	3	5	4
(Italy) D Nargiso	6	7	6
(Sweden) M Pernfors	6	6	6
(United States) J Courier	3	4	4
(United States) K Curren	6	3	2	6	3
2	(Sweden) M Wilander	3	6	6	3	6

Third round
(Australia) M Woodforde	6	5	6	6
(Italy) D Nargiso	1	7	3	0
(Sweden) M Pernfors	4	0	5
2	(Sweden) M Wilander	6	6	7

Fourth round
(Australia) M Woodforde	3	2	2
2	(Sweden) M Wilander	6	6	6

Preceded by 1988 Wimbledon Championships – Men's singles	Grand Slam men's singles	Succeeded by 1989 Australian Open – Men's singles
