= 1991 ATP Challenger Series =

Tennis tour

Details
- Duration: 28 January 1991 – 22 December 1991
- Edition: 14th
- Tournaments: 95

Achievements (singles)

The ATP Challenger Series is the second tier tour for professional tennis organised by the Association of Tennis Professionals (ATP). The 1991 ATP Challenger Series calendar comprised 94 tournaments, with prize money ranging from $25,000 up to $100,000.

== Schedule ==
=== January ===
| Date | Country | Tournament | Prizemoney | Draw | Surface | Singles champion | Doubles champions |
|---|---|---|---|---|---|---|---|
| 21.01. | Germany | Heilbronn Open | $ 50,000 | 32S/16D | Carpet (i) | (Italy) Diego Nargiso | (Italy) Diego Nargiso (Italy) Stefano Pescosolido |
| 21.01. | Chile | Viña del Mar Challenger | $ 25,000 | 32S/16D | Clay | (Argentina) Gustavo Giussani | (Cuba) Juan Pino (United States) Mario Tabares |
| 28.01. | Nigeria | Benin City Challenger | $ 50,000 | 32S/16D | Hard | (Italy) Ugo Colombini | (United States) Mark Keil (United States) Scott Patridge |
| 28.01. | India | Bangalore Challenger | $ 25,000 | 32S/16D | Clay | (Germany) Frank Dennhardt | (Soviet Union) Vladimir Gabrichidze (Romania) Mihnea-Ion Năstase |

=== February ===
| Date | Country | Tournament | Prizemoney | Draw | Surface | Singles champion | Doubles champions |
|---|---|---|---|---|---|---|---|
| 04.02. | Indonesia | Jakarta Challenger I | $ 75,000 | 32S/16D | Clay | (Czechoslovakia) Václav Roubíček | (Italy) Massimo Ardinghi (Italy) Massimo Boscatto |
| 04.02. | Nigeria | Lagos Challenger | $ 75,000 | 32S/16D | Hard | (Netherlands) Paul Haarhuis | (Italy) Ugo Colombini (Kenya) Paul Wekesa |
| 04.02. | Great Britain | Telford Challenger | $ 50,000 | 32S/16D | Carpet (i) | (Netherlands) Jan Siemerink | (Canada) Martin Laurendeau (Mexico) Leonardo Lavalle |
| 11.02. | Brazil | São Paulo Challenger I | $ 25,000 | 32S/16D | Clay | (Argentina) Gabriel Markus | (Sweden) Henrik Holm (Sweden) Nils Holm |
| 18.02. | Brazil | Americana Challenger | $ 25,000 | 32S/16D | Hard | (Japan) Shuzo Matsuoka | (Brazil) Alexandre Hocevar (Brazil) Marcos Hocevar |
| 25.02. | Guadeloupe | Guadeloupe Challenger | $ 75,000 | 32S/16D | Hard | (France) Olivier Delaître | (Portugal) João Cunha e Silva (Portugal) Nuno Marques |
| 25.02. | United States | Indian Wells Challenger | $ 50,000 | 32S/16D | Hard | (Italy) Cristiano Caratti | (Cuba) Joey Rive (United States) Robert Van't Hof |

=== March ===
| Date | Country | Tournament | Prizemoney | Draw | Surface | Singles champion | Doubles champions |
|---|---|---|---|---|---|---|---|
| 11.03. | Chile | Santiago Challenger | $ 25,000 | 32S/16D | Clay | (Argentina) Alberto Mancini | (Argentina) Gustavo Garetto (Argentina) Marcelo Ingaramo |
| 25.03. | Mexico | San Luis Potosí Challenger | $ 100,000 | 32S/16D | Clay | (Peru) Pablo Arraya | (Colombia) Mauricio Hadad (Argentina) Daniel Orsanic |
| 25.03. | France | Marseille Challenger | $ 50,000 | 32S/16D | Clay | (Haiti) Ronald Agénor | (Italy) Massimo Boscatto (Italy) Stefano Pescosolido |

=== April ===
| Date | Country | Tournament | Prizemoney | Draw | Surface | Singles champion | Doubles champions |
|---|---|---|---|---|---|---|---|
| 01.04. | Spain | Zaragoza Challenger | $ 50,000 | 32S/16D | Clay | (Spain) José Francisco Altur | (Italy) Massimo Cierro (Italy) Stefano Pescosolido |
| 08.04. | Italy | Parioli Challenger | $ 50,000 | 32S/16D | Clay | (Italy) Stefano Pescosolido | (Spain) Marcos Górriz (Soviet Union) Andrei Olhovskiy |
| 15.04. | Mexico | Mexico City Challenger | $ 100,000 | 32S/16D | Clay | (Brazil) Fernando Roese | (Brazil) Ricardo Acioly (Argentina) Pablo Albano |
| 15.04. | Portugal | Oporto Challenger I | $ 100,000 | 32S/16D | Clay | (Italy) Stefano Pescosolido | (Soviet Union) Dimitri Poliakov (Czechoslovakia) Tomáš Anzari |
| 15.04. | Chinese Taipei | Taipei Challenger | $ 100,000 | 32S/16D | Hard | (Germany) Markus Zoecke | (United States) Kelly Jones (Australia) Todd Woodbridge |
| 22.04. | Portugal | Lisbon Challenger | $ 100,000 | 32S/16D | Clay | (Belgium) Bart Wuyts | (South Africa) David Adams (Brazil) Jaime Oncins |
| 22.04. | United States | Birmingham Challenger | $ 50,000 | 32S/16D | Clay | (Argentina) Marcelo Ingaramo | (United States) Mark Keil (United States) Dave Randall |
| 22.04. | Japan | Nagoya Challenger | $ 50,000 | 32S/16D | Hard | (United States) John Stimpson | (United States) Glenn Layendecker (Australia) Simon Youl |
| 29.04. | Malaysia | Kuala Lumpur Challenger | $ 50,000 | 32S/16D | Hard | (United States) Glenn Layendecker | (United Kingdom) Andrew Castle (Kenya) Paul Wekesa |
| 29.04. | Czechoslovakia | Prague Challenger | $ 25,000 | 32S/16D | Clay | (Czechoslovakia) Jan Kodeš Jr. | (United States) Steve DeVries (Czechoslovakia) Richard Vogel |
| 29.04. | Brazil | São Paulo Challenger II | $ 25,000 | 32S/16D | Hard | (Brazil) Fernando Roese | (Brazil) Ricardo Acioly (Brazil) Mauro Menezes |

=== May ===
| Date | Country | Tournament | Prizemoney | Draw | Surface | Singles champion | Doubles champions |
|---|---|---|---|---|---|---|---|
| 06.05. | Yugoslavia | Ljubljana Challenger | $ 50,000 | 32S/16D | Clay | (Socialist Federal Republic of Yugoslavia) Slobodan Živojinović | (Soviet Union) Andrei Olhovskiy (Socialist Federal Republic of Yugoslavia) Slobodan Živojinović |
| 06.05. | Brazil | Ribeirão Challenger | $ 25,000 | 32S/16D | Clay | (Brazil) Roberto Jabali | (Brazil) Ricardo Acioly (Brazil) Mauro Menezes |
| 27.05. | Germany | Bielefeld Challenger | $ 50,000 | 32S/16D | Clay | (Soviet Union) Dimitri Poliakov | (Australia) Carl Limberger (Romania) Florin Segărceanu |

=== June ===
| Date | Country | Tournament | Prizemoney | Draw | Surface | Singles champion | Doubles champions |
|---|---|---|---|---|---|---|---|
| 03.06. | Italy | Turin Challenger | $ 100,000 | 32S/16D | Clay | (Italy) Paolo Canè | (Italy) Omar Camporese (Italy) Renzo Furlan |
| 03.06. | Germany | Quelle Cup | $ 50,000 | 32S/16D | Clay | (Spain) Marcos Górriz | (Spain) Marcos Górriz (Venezuela) Maurice Ruah |
| 10.06. | Germany | Cologne Challenger | $ 50,000 | 32S/16D | Clay | (Sweden) Magnus Gustafsson | (South Africa) Brent Haygarth (South Africa) Byron Talbot |
| 10.06. | Brazil | Itu Challenger | $ 25,000 | 32S/16D | Hard | (Czechoslovakia) Libor Němeček | (Brazil) Ricardo Acioly (Brazil) Mauro Menezes |
| 24.06. | Austria | Salzburg Challenger | $ 100,000 | 32S/16D | Clay | (Germany) Markus Rackl | (Sweden) Johan Carlsson (Sweden) David Engel |
| 24.06. | Spain | Seville Challenger | $ 25,000 | 32S/16D | Clay | (Germany) Lars Koslowski | (Czechoslovakia) David Rikl (France) Éric Winogradsky |

=== July ===
| Date | Country | Tournament | Prizemoney | Draw | Surface | Singles champion | Doubles champions |
|---|---|---|---|---|---|---|---|
| 01.07. | Portugal | Oporto Challenger II | $ 100,000 | 32S/16D | Clay | (Belgium) Bart Wuyts | (Czechoslovakia) Josef Čihák (Czechoslovakia) Tomáš Anzari |
| 01.07. | Italy | Salerno Challenger | $ 75,000 | 32S/16D | Clay | (Argentina) Guillermo Pérez Roldán | (South Africa) Marcos Ondruska (Venezuela) Nicolás Pereira |
| 01.07. | Switzerland | Nyon Challenger | $ 25,000 | 32S/16D | Clay | (Germany) Markus Naewie | (Czechoslovakia) Martin Damm (Czechoslovakia) Branislav Stankovič |
| 08.07. | Great Britain | Bristol Challenger | $ 50,000 | 32S/16D | Grass | (Australia) John Fitzgerald | (Nigeria) Nduka Odizor (Netherlands) Michiel Schapers |
| 08.07. | Brazil | Gramado Challenger | $ 50,000 | 32S/16D | Hard | (France) Laurent Prades | (Brazil) Nelson Aerts (Brazil) Fernando Roese |
| 08.07. | Japan | Kakegawa Challenger | $ 50,000 | 32S/16D | Hard | (Italy) Massimo Ardinghi | (United Kingdom) Sean Cole (Republic of Ireland) Eoin Collins |
| 08.07. | Germany | Müller Cup | $ 50,000 | 32S/16D | Clay | (France) Rodolphe Gilbert | (France) Tarik Benhabiles (France) Olivier Delaître |
| 08.07. | United States | New Haven Challenger | $ 50,000 | 32S/16D | Hard | (United States) Alex O'Brien | (South Africa) Royce Deppe (United States) T. J. Middleton |
| 15.07. | Finland | Tampere Challenger | $ 100,000 | 32S/16D | Clay | (Italy) Claudio Pistolesi | (Spain) Tomás Carbonell (Spain) Marcos Górriz |
| 15.07. | Great Britain | Newcastle Challenger | $ 50,000 | 32S/16D | Grass | (South Africa) Christo van Rensburg | (United Kingdom) Nick Fulwood (Sweden) Peter Nyborg |
| 15.07. | Brazil | Campos Challenger | $ 25,000 | 32S/16D | Hard | (Senegal) Yahiya Doumbia | (Senegal) Yahiya Doumbia (France) Jean-Philippe Fleurian |
| 22.07. | United States | Aptos Challenger | $ 50,000 | 32S/16D | Hard | (United States) Chuck Adams | (Nigeria) Nduka Odizor (United States) Bryan Shelton |
| 22.07. | Brazil | Fortaleza Challenger | $ 50,000 | 32S/16D | Clay | (Mexico) Oliver Fernández | (Brazil) Nelson Aerts (Brazil) Danilo Marcelino |
| 22.07. | Finland | Hanko Challenger | $ 50,000 | 32S/16D | Clay | (Sweden) Jan Apell | (Sweden) Jan Apell (Finland) Olli Rahnasto |
| 22.07. | Poland | Warsaw Challenger | $ 50,000 | 32S/16D | Clay | (Czechoslovakia) Martin Damm | (Soviet Union) Ģirts Dzelde (Soviet Union) Andres Võsand |
| 29.07. | Spain | Salou Challenger | $ 75,000 | 32S/16D | Clay | (Mexico) Leonardo Lavalle | (United States) Murphy Jensen (United States) Francisco Montana |
| 29.07. | Brazil | Lins Challenger | $ 50,000 | 32S/16D | Clay | (Venezuela) Nicolás Pereira | (Brazil) Ricardo Acioly (Brazil) Mauro Menezes |
| 29.07. | United States | Winnetka Challenger | $ 50,000 | 32S/16D | Hard | (Zimbabwe) Byron Black | (Zimbabwe) Byron Black (United States) Scott Melville |

=== August ===
| Date | Country | Tournament | Prizemoney | Draw | Surface | Singles champion | Doubles champions |
|---|---|---|---|---|---|---|---|
| 05.08. | Italy | Cervia Challenger | $ 100,000 | 32S/16D | Clay | (Switzerland) Claudio Mezzadri | (Argentina) Christian Miniussi (Uruguay) Diego Pérez |
| 05.08. | Spain | Open Castilla y León | $ 100,000 | 32S/16D | Hard | (Spain) Javier Sánchez | (Spain) Francisco Clavet (Spain) Javier Sánchez |
| 05.08. | Brazil | São Paulo Challenger III | $ 25,000 | 32S/16D | Clay | (Venezuela) Nicolás Pereira | (Argentina) Pablo Albano (Argentina) Luis Lobo |
| 12.08. | Italy | Pescara Challenger | $ 50,000 | 32S/16D | Clay | (Soviet Union) Vladimir Gabrichidze | (Czechoslovakia) Josef Čihák (Czechoslovakia) Tomáš Anzari |
| 19.08. | Switzerland | Geneva Challenger | $ 50,000 | 32S/16D | Clay | (Spain) Marcos Górriz | (Soviet Union) Vladimir Gabrichidze (Czechoslovakia) Martin Střelba |
| 19.08. | Indonesia | Jakarta Challenger II | $ 25,000 | 32S/16D | Hard | (Italy) Mario Visconti | (United States) Mike Briggs (United States) Trevor Kronemann |
| 26.08. | Italy | Merano Challenger | $ 25,000 | 32S/16D | Clay | (France) Frédéric Fontang | (Spain) Carlos Costa (Argentina) Christian Miniussi |

=== September ===
| Date | Country | Tournament | Prizemoney | Draw | Surface | Singles champion | Doubles champions |
|---|---|---|---|---|---|---|---|
| 02.09. | Turkey | Istanbul Challenger | $ 100,000 | 32S/16D | Hard | (France) Olivier Delaître | (Sweden) Nils Holm (Sweden) Henrik Holm |
| 02.09. | Italy | Venice Challenger | $ 100,000 | 32S/16D | Clay | (Spain) Carlos Costa | (Spain) Jordi Arrese (Spain) Francisco Roig |
| 02.09. | Austria | Graz Challenger | $ 25,000 | 32S/16D | Clay | (Austria) Thomas Buchmayer | (Sweden) Jan Apell (Israel) Raviv Weidenfeld |
| 09.09. | Portugal | Azores Challenger | $ 100,000 | 32S/16D | Hard | (South Africa) Marcos Ondruska | (Zimbabwe) Byron Black (United States) T. J. Middleton |
| 16.09. | Romania | Bucharest Challenger | $ 100,000 | 32S/16D | Clay | (Uruguay) Marcelo Filippini | (Germany) Lars Koslowski (Sweden) Tomas Nydahl |
| 16.09. | Italy | Messina Challenger | $ 100,000 | 32S/16D | Clay | (Italy) Massimo Valeri | (Italy) Renzo Furlan (Argentina) Guillermo Pérez Roldán |
| 16.09. | Colombia | Bogotá Challenger | $ 50,000 | 32S/16D | Clay | (Argentina) Roberto Saad | (Argentina) Gustavo Guerrero (Argentina) Roberto Saad |
| 16.09. | Singapore | Singapore Challenger | $ 50,000 | 32S/16D | Hard | (Australia) Mark Woodforde | (United States) Mike Briggs (United States) Trevor Kronemann |
| 16.09. | Canada | Whistler Challenger | $ 50,000 | 32S/16D | Hard | (Brazil) Fabio Silberberg | (United States) Steve DeVries (United States) Patrick Galbraith |
| 16.09. | Portugal | Madeira Challenger | $ 25,000 | 32S/16D | Hard | (Zimbabwe) Byron Black | (South Africa) John-Laffnie de Jager (South Africa) Byron Talbot |
| 23.09. | United States | Bloomfield Challenger | $ 50,000 | 32S/16D | Hard | (Canada) Chris Pridham | (United States) Steve DeVries (United States) Matt Lucena |
| 23.09. | Colombia | Cali Challenger | $ 50,000 | 32S/16D | Clay | (Belgium) Xavier Daufresne | (Argentina) Gustavo Guerrero (Argentina) Roberto Saad |
| 30.09. | Italy | Siracusa Challenger | $ 75,000 | 32S/16D | Clay | (Spain) Carlos Costa | (Italy) Massimo Boscatto (Italy) Cristian Brandi |
| 30.09. | Israel | Jerusalem Challenger | $ 50,000 | 32S/16D | Hard | (South Africa) Christo van Rensburg | (South Africa) John-Laffnie de Jager (South Africa) Christo van Rensburg |
| 30.09. | United States | Ponte Vedra Beach Challenger | $ 50,000 | 32S/16D | Hard | (United States) Jonathan Stark | (United States) Steve DeVries (United States) Kenny Thorne |

=== October ===
| Date | Country | Tournament | Prizemoney | Draw | Surface | Singles champion | Doubles champions |
|---|---|---|---|---|---|---|---|
| 07.10. | United States | Pembroke Pines Challenger | $ 75,000 | 32S/16D | Clay | (Ecuador) Raúl Viver | (Argentina) Roberto Saad (Sweden) Tobias Svantesson |
| 07.10. | Morocco | Casablanca Challenger | $ 50,000 | 32S/16D | Clay | (Germany) Jens Wöhrmann | (Germany) Marc-Kevin Goellner (Haiti) Bertrand Madsen |
| 07.10. | France | Cherbourg Challenger | $ 50,000 | 32S/16D | Hard (i) | (United Kingdom) Jeremy Bates | (Netherlands) Sander Groen (South Africa) Byron Talbot |
| 07.10. | Italy | Reggio Calabria Challenger | $ 50,000 | 32S/16D | Clay | (Germany) Lars Koslowski | (Italy) Cristian Brandi (Italy) Federico Mordegan |
| 14.10. | Egypt | Cairo Challenger | $ 100,000 | 32S/16D | Hard | (United States) Bryan Shelton | (Czechoslovakia) Martin Damm (Czechoslovakia) David Rikl |
| 14.10. | Brazil | São Paulo Challenger IV | $ 50,000 | 32S/16D | Clay | (Brazil) Jaime Oncins | (Brazil) Luiz Mattar (Brazil) Jaime Oncins |
| 21.10. | France | Brest Challenger | $ 100,000 | 32S/16D | Hard (i) | (France) Fabrice Santoro | (Germany) Lars Koslowski (Germany) Arne Thoms |
| 28.10. | Germany | Lambertz Open by STAWAG | $ 50,000 | 32S/16D | Carpet (i) | (Germany) Alexander Mronz | (United States) Mark Keil (South Africa) Byron Talbot |

=== November ===
| Date | Country | Tournament | Prizemoney | Draw | Surface | Singles champion | Doubles champions |
|---|---|---|---|---|---|---|---|
| 04.11. | Finland | Helsinki Challenger | $ 100,000 | 32S/16D | Carpet (i) | (Netherlands) Michiel Schapers | (France) Tarik Benhabiles (France) Henri Leconte |
| 04.11. | Australia | Tasmania Challenger | $ 25,000 | 32S/16D | Hard | (Australia) Sandon Stolle | (Australia) Michael Brown (Australia) Andrew Kratzmann |
| 11.11. | Brazil | São Paulo Challenger V | $ 50,000 | 32S/16D | Clay | (Ecuador) Raúl Viver | (United States) Francisco Montana (United States) Greg Van Emburgh |
| 11.11. | New Zealand | Christchurch Challenger | $ 25,000 | 32S/16D | Carpet (i) | (United Kingdom) Mark Petchey | (Australia) Neil Borwick (Australia) Simon Youl |
| 18.11. | Germany | Munich Challenger | $ 50,000 | 32S/16D | Carpet (i) | (Germany) Arne Thoms | (Netherlands) Tom Kempers (Canada) Chris Pridham |
| 18.11. | New Zealand | Auckland Challenger | $ 25,000 | 32S/16D | Hard | (Australia) Simon Youl | (New Zealand) Bruce Derlin (Australia) Carl Limberger |
| 18.11. | Brazil | São Paulo Challenger VI | $ 25,000 | 32S/16D | Hard | (Brazil) Cássio Motta | (Portugal) João Cunha e Silva (Brazil) Fernando Roese |
| 25.11. | Switzerland | Bossonnens Challenger | $ 100,000 | 32S/16D | Hard (i) | (South Africa) Christo van Rensburg | (Austria) Alex Antonitsch (Netherlands) Menno Oosting |
| 25.11. | South Africa | Johannesburg Challenger | $ 100,000 | 32S/16D | Hard | (United States) Todd Witsken | (United States) Kevin Curren (South Africa) Royce Deppe |
| 25.11. | Mexico | Puebla Challenger | $ 50,000 | 32S/16D | Hard | (United States) Kent Kinnear | (Mexico) Oliver Fernández (Mexico) Luis Herrera |

=== December ===
| Date | Country | Tournament | Prizemoney | Draw | Surface | Singles champion | Doubles champions |
|---|---|---|---|---|---|---|---|
| 09.12. | Hong Kong | Hongkong Challenger | $ 25,000 | 32S/16D | Hard | (Germany) Bernd Karbacher | (United States) Luke Jensen (United States) Murphy Jensen |
| 16.12. | Guam | Guam Challenger | $ 25,000 | 32S/16D | Hard | (United States) Richard Matuszewski | (United States) Steve DeVries (United States) Ted Scherman |
