= 1985 Melbourne Outdoor – Doubles =

Doubles
- 1985 Melbourne Outdoor

Final
- Champions: (Australia) Darren Cahill (Australia) Peter Carter
- Runners-up: (United States) Brett Dickinson (Argentina) Roberto Saad
- Score: 7–6^{(7–3)}, 6–1

Details
- Draw: 16
- Seeds: 4

Events
Singles	Doubles
← 1984 ·	Melbourne Outdoor

Broderick Dyke and Wally Masur were the defending champions, but Masur did not compete this year. Dyke teamed up with Tomm Warneke and lost in the semifinals to Brett Dickinson and Roberto Saad.

Darren Cahill and Peter Carter won the title by defeating Dickinson and Saad 7–6^{(7–3)}, 6–1 in the final.

== Seeds ==
1. (Australia) Peter Doohan / (Australia) Brad Drewett (semifinals)
2. (Australia) Broderick Dyke / (United States) Tomm Warneke (semifinals)
3. (Sweden) Peter Carlsson / (Australia) Mark Woodforde (quarterfinals)
4. (Australia) Craig A. Miller / (Australia) Laurie Warder (quarterfinals)

== Draw ==
=== Key ===
- Q = Qualifier
- WC = Wild card
- LL = Lucky loser
- Alt = Alternate
- SE = Special exempt
- PR = Protected ranking
- ITF = ITF entry
- JE = Junior exempt
- w/o = Walkover
- r = Retired
- d = Defaulted
- SR = Special ranking

=== Draw ===
First round
1	(Australia) P Doohan (Australia) B Drewett	7	6
(United States) K Richter (United States) R Rudeen	6	3
(United States) M Bauer (Australia) M Kratzmann	6	3	4
(West Germany) H Rittersbacher (Australia) D Tyson	3	6	6
3	(Sweden) P Carlsson (Australia) M Woodforde	6	6
(United States) T Erck (United States) Craig Kardon	2	0
(Austria) A Antonitsch (Netherlands) M Schapers	6	7	3
(Australia) D Cahill (Australia) P Carter	7	6	6
(Australia) R Barlow (Australia) C Limberger	6	0
(United States) B Dickinson (Argentina) R Saad	7	6
(United Kingdom) C Dowdeswell (Switzerland) D Utzinger	6	2
4	(Australia) CA Miller (Australia) L Warder	7	6
(United States) D Dowlen (United States) L Shiras	6	5	6
(New Zealand) B Derlin (New Zealand) R Simpson	4	7	7
(West Germany) T Meinecke (West Germany) R Osterthun	2	7	4
2	(Australia) B Dyke (United States) T Warneke	6	6	6

Quarterfinals
1	(Australia) P Doohan (Australia) B Drewett	6	3	7
(West Germany) H Rittersbacher (Australia) D Tyson	2	6	6
3	(Sweden) P Carlsson (Australia) M Woodforde	5	6
(Australia) D Cahill (Australia) P Carter	7	7
(United States) B Dickinson (Argentina) R Saad	6	7
4	(Australia) CA Miller (Australia) L Warder	1	6
(New Zealand) B Derlin (New Zealand) R Simpson	6	4
2	(Australia) B Dyke (United States) T Warneke	7	6

Semifinals
1	(Australia) P Doohan (Australia) B Drewett	6	3	4
(Australia) D Cahill (Australia) P Carter	4	6	6
(United States) B Dickinson (Argentina) R Saad	6	6
2	(Australia) B Dyke (United States) T Warneke	1	1

Final
(Australia) D Cahill (Australia) P Carter	7^{7}	6
(United States) B Dickinson (Argentina) R Saad	6^{3}	1
