= John Yancey (tennis) =

American tennis player

- Full name: John Yancey
- Country (sports): United States
- Born: January 18, 1970 (age 55)
- Plays: Right-handed
- Prize money: $17,310

Doubles
- Career record: 1–8
- Career titles: 0; 0 Challenger, 0 Futures
- Highest ranking: No. 142 (14 February 1994)
- Last updated on: 13 May 2023.

John Yancey (born January 18, 1970) is a former professional tennis player from the United States.

== Biography ==
As a junior Yancey partnered with Jonathan Stark to win the boys' doubles title at the 1988 US Open.

Recruited from Grosse Pointe, Yancey played collegiate tennis at the Kentucky Wildcats. He also had an opportunity to play basketball for the Wildcats but decided to dedicate all of his efforts to tennis.

In the early 1990s he played on the professional tour as a doubles specialist. Across 1993 and 1994 he appeared in the main draw of eight ATP Tour tournaments. His best result was a quarter-final appearance partnering Rich Benson at the San Marino Open in the 1993 season and the following year he reached his highest ranking of 142 in the world for doubles.

== Junior Grand Slam finals ==
=== Doubles: 1 (1 title) ===
Result	Year	Tournament	Surface	Partner	Opponents	Score
Win	1988	US Open	Hard	(United States) Jonathan Stark	(Italy) Massimo Boscatto (Italy) Stefano Pescosolido	7–6, 7–5

== ATP Challenger and ITF Futures Finals ==
=== Doubles: 2 (0–2) ===
Legend ATP Challenger (0–2) ITF Futures (0–0)	Finals by surface Hard (0–0) Clay (0–1) Grass (0–0) Carpet (0–1)

Result	W–L	Date	Tournament	Tier	Surface	Partner	Opponents	Score
Loss	0–1	Jul 1993	Seville, Spain	Challenger	Clay	(United States) Steve Campbell	(Spain) Emilio Benfele Álvarez (Spain) Pepe Imaz	7–6, 1–6, 2–6
Loss	0–2	Oct 1993	Munich, Germany	Challenger	Carpet	(Australia) Jon Ireland	(Netherlands) Sander Groen (Germany) Arne Thoms	3–6, 3–6
