= 1987 Seoul Open =

- Date: 20–27 April
- Edition: 1st
- Category: Grand Prix
- Draw: 32S / 16D
- Prize money: $89,400
- Surface: Hard / outdoor
- Location: Seoul, South Korea

Champions

Singles
- (United States) Jim Grabb

Doubles
- (United States) Eric Korita / (United States) Mike Leach
Seoul Open	· 1988 →

The 1987 Seoul Open was a men's tennis tournament played on outdoor hard courts that was part of the 1987 Nabisco Grand Prix. It was the inaugural edition of the tournament and was played at Seoul in South Korea from April 20 through April 27, 1987. Second-seeded Jim Grabb won the singles title.

== Finals ==
=== Singles ===
(United States) Jim Grabb defeated (United States) Andre Agassi 1–6, 6–4, 6–2

- It was Grabb's 1st title of the year and the 1st of his career.

=== Doubles ===
(United States) Eric Korita / (United States) Mike Leach defeated (United States) Ken Flach / (United States) Jim Grabb 6–7, 6–1, 7–5

- It was Korita's only title of the year and the 1st of his career. It was Leach's only title of the year and the 4th of his career.
