= Peter Carter (tennis) =

Australian tennis player (1964–2002)

- Country (sports): Australia
- Born: 9 August 1964 Adelaide, Australia
- Died: 1 August 2002 (aged 37) South Africa
- Height: 180 cm (5 ft 11 in)
- Turned pro: 1982
- Retired: 1991
- Plays: Right-handed (one-handed backhand)
- Prize money: $70,705

Singles
- Career record: 4–17
- Highest ranking: No. 173 (1987.07.13)

Grand Slam singles results
- Australian Open: 1R (1982, 1988, 1989)
- Wimbledon: Q2 (1988)

Doubles
- Career record: 14–33
- Career titles: 1
- Highest ranking: No. 117 (1986.04.07)

Grand Slam doubles results
- Australian Open: 2R (1985, 1988)
- French Open: 1R (1985, 1988)
- Wimbledon: 1R (1988)
- US Open: 1R (1982)

Peter Carter (9 August 1964 – 1 August 2002) was an Australian tennis player and coach. He is widely known as the most influential coach of Roger Federer.

== Playing career ==
Carter won the 1985 Melbourne Tennis Tournament with Darren Cahill. He reached a career high of 173 in singles and 117 in doubles on the ATP, but his career was hampered by injuries.

== Coaching career ==
Carter is widely known particularly as the coach of tennis champion Roger Federer. He met Federer when he was 9 and quickly identified him as a future world no 1. Federer has said that “Peter was an incredibly inspirational and important person in my life. He taught me respect for each person. I can never thank him enough.”

Federer won his first Grand Slam event the year following Carter’s death at the 2003 Wimbledon Championships, which Federer dedicated to Carter.

== Death ==
Carter died in a car accident on 1 August 2002 while on a belated honeymoon to Kruger National Park in South Africa (his wife Sylvia had been recovering from Hodgkin's disease). Carter was in a vehicle which swerved off the road to avoid a head-on collision with a minivan.

== Career finals ==
=== Doubles (1 titles) ===
Result	No.	Date	Tournament	Surface	Partner	Opponents	Score
Win	1.	Dec 1985	Melbourne, Australia	Grass	(Australia) Darren Cahill	(United States) Brett Dickinson (Argentina) Roberto Saad	7–6^{(7–3)}, 6–1

== ATP Challenger Tour Finals ==
=== Singles: 1 (0–1) ===
Result	W–L	Date	Tournament	Surface	Opponent	Score
Loss	0-1	Nov 1989	Guangzhou International, China	Hard	(South Korea) Roh Gap-Taik	5–7, 2–6

=== Doubles: 4 (0–4) ===
Result	W–L	Date	Tournament	Surface	Partner	Opponents	Score
Loss	0-1	Oct 1983	Sydney, Australia	Hard	(Australia) Mark Kratzmann	(Australia) Michael Fancutt (Australia) Wally Masur	5–7, 3–6
Loss	0-2	Jan 1984	Perth, Australia	Grass	(Australia) Mark Hartnett	(Australia) Broderick Dyke (United States) John Van Nostrand	2–6, 3–6
Loss	0-3	Nov 1987	Valkenswaard, Netherlands	Carpet	(United States) Leif Shiras	(Netherlands) Michiel Schapers (Netherlands) Huub van Boeckel	6–3, 3–6, 2–6
Loss	0-4	Feb 1991	Jakarta, Malaysia	Clay	(Sweden) Niclas Kroon	(Italy) Massimo Ardinghi (Italy) Massimo Boscatto	7–5, 4–6, 6–7
