= 1988 US Open (tennis) =

- Date: August 29 – September 11
- Edition: 108th
- Category: Grand Slam (ITF)
- Surface: Hardcourt
- Location: New York City, New York

Champions

Men's singles
- (Sweden) Mats Wilander

Women's singles
- (West Germany) Steffi Graf

Men's doubles
- (Spain) Sergio Casal / (Spain) Emilio Sánchez

Women's doubles
- (United States) Gigi Fernández / (United States) Robin White

Mixed doubles
- (Czechoslovakia) Jana Novotná / (United States) Jim Pugh

Boys' singles
- (Venezuela) Nicolás Pereira

Girls' singles
- (United States) Carrie Cunningham

Boys' doubles
- (United States) Jonathan Stark / (United States) John Yancey

Girls' doubles
- (United States) Meredith McGrath / (United States) Kimberly Po
← 1987 ·	US Open	· 1989 →

The 1988 US Open was a tennis tournament played on outdoor hard courts at the USTA National Tennis Center in New York City, New York. It was the 108th edition of the US Open and was held from August 29 to September 11, 1988.

== Seniors ==
=== Men's singles ===
(Sweden) Mats Wilander defeated (Czechoslovakia) Ivan Lendl 6–4, 4–6, 6–3, 5–7, 6–4

- It was Wilander's 7th and last career Grand Slam title and his only US Open title. He became the first male player since Jimmy Connors in 1974 to win three Grand Slam titles in a season, and third in the Open Era (also Rod Laver in 1969). Wilander would be the last man in the Open Era to win three slam titles until Roger Federer in 2004. The final was the longest in the Open's history, lasting 4 hours and 54 minutes (the 2012 US Open final where Andy Murray defeated Novak Djokovic was also 4 hours and 54 minutes.)

=== Women's singles ===
(West Germany) Steffi Graf defeated (Argentina) Gabriela Sabatini 6–3, 3–6, 6–1

- It was Graf's 5th career Grand Slam title and her 1st US Open title. She became the second woman in the Open Era to complete a singles Grand Slam in a calendar year after Margaret Court did so in 1970.

=== Men's doubles ===
(Spain) Sergio Casal / (Spain) Emilio Sánchez defeated (United States) Rick Leach / (United States) Jim Pugh by walkover

- It was Casal's 2nd career Grand Slam title and his 2nd and last US Open title. It was Sánchez's 4th career Grand Slam title and his 2nd and last US Open title.

=== Women's doubles ===
(United States) Gigi Fernández / (United States) Robin White defeated (United States) Patty Fendick / (Canada) Jill Hetherington 6–4, 6–1

- It was the 1st career Grand Slam title and 1st US Open title for both Fernández and White.

=== Mixed doubles ===
(Czechoslovakia) Jana Novotná / (United States) Jim Pugh defeated (Australia) Elizabeth Smylie / (United States) Patrick McEnroe 7–5, 6–3

- It was Novotná's 2nd career Grand Slam title and her 1st US Open title. It was Pugh's 3rd career Grand Slam title and his only US Open title.

== Juniors ==
=== Boys' singles ===
(Venezuela) Nicolás Pereira defeated (Sweden) Nicklas Kulti 6–1, 6–2

=== Girls' singles ===
(United States) Carrie Cunningham defeated (Australia) Rachel McQuillan 7–5, 6–3

=== Boys' doubles ===
(United States) Jonathan Stark / (United States) John Yancey defeated (Italy) Massimo Boscatto / (Italy) Stefano Pescosolido 7–6, 7–5

=== Girls' doubles ===
(United States) Meredith McGrath / (United States) Kimberly Po defeated (Italy) Cathy Caverzasio / (Italy) Laura Lapi 6–3, 6–1

== Notes ==
Preceded by 1988 Wimbledon Championships	Grand Slams	Succeeded by 1989 Australian Open
