= Martin Laurendeau =

Canadian tennis player

- Country (sports): Canada
- Residence: Montreal, Quebec, Canada
- Born: July 10, 1964 (age 62) Montreal, Quebec, Canada
- Height: 191 cm (6.27 ft)
- Turned pro: 1986
- Plays: Right-handed (two-handed backhand)
- Prize money: $349,692

Singles
- Career record: 36–60
- Career titles: 0
- Highest ranking: No. 90 (October 10, 1988)

Grand Slam singles results
- Australian Open: 2R (1988)
- French Open: 1R (1987)
- Wimbledon: 3R (1991)
- US Open: 4R (1988)

Doubles
- Career record: 15–33
- Career titles: 0
- Highest ranking: No. 139 (August 21, 1989)

Grand Slam doubles results
- Australian Open: 2R (1990)
- Wimbledon: 1R (1991)
- US Open: 2R (1988)

Martin Laurendeau (French pronunciation: [maʁtɛ̃ lɔʁɑ̃do]; born July 10, 1964) is a tennis coach and a former professional player. He is the current Head of Men’s Tennis for Tennis Canada. He was previously captain of the Canada Davis Cup team from 2004 to 2017.

== Professional career ==
A 6'3 right-hander, Laurendeau starred in collegiate tennis at Pepperdine University where he played between 1984 and 1987. He finished his career with the second most career singles wins in school history with 80 and the third best singles winning percentage (.816).

During his pro career which stretched from 1986 to 1993, Laurendeau had a career ATP tour singles win–loss record of 36 and 60. His best results were a round of 16 appearance in the 1988 U.S. Open and a third round appearance at the 1991 Wimbledon Championships, both in singles. His best ranking was World No. 90 which he achieved in October 1988. His tour doubles record stands at 15 and 33.

== Coaching career ==
Laurendeau has been a tennis coach since 1994 and is currently coaching top-50 player Gabriel Diallo since 2021. He became the Canada Davis Cup captain upon the resignation of Grant Connell in 2004.

== Career finals ==
=== Singles (4–2) ===
Legend
Grand Slam (0)
ATP Masters Series (0)
ATP Tour (0)
Challengers (4–2)

Result	No.	Date	Tournament	Surface	Opponent	Score
Win	1.	September 1987	Thessaloniki, Greece	Hard	(Sweden) Niclas Kroon	7–6, 6–4
Win	2.	April 1989	São Paulo, Brazil	Hard	(Brazil) Dacio Campos	7–6, 6–3
Win	3.	June 1989	Dijon, France	Carpet	(United States) Brad Pearce	4–6, 6–1, 7–6
Loss	4.	October 1989	Cherbourg, France	Hard (i)	(Finland) Veli Paloheimo	6–3, 3–6, 2–6
Loss	5.	February 1991	Telford, United Kingdom	Carpet (i)	(Netherlands) Jan Siemerink	3–6, 4–6
Win	6.	March 1993	Garmisch-Partenkirchen, Germany	Carpet (i)	(Germany) Patrick Baur	6–0, 6–4
