= Jon Levine (tennis) =

American tennis player

- Country (sports): United States
- Born: September 29, 1963 (age 61); Phoenix, Arizona
- Height: 5 ft 10 in (178 cm)
- Plays: Right-handed
- Prize money: $122,618

Singles
- Career record: 10-32
- Career titles: 0
- Highest ranking: No. 120 (June 23, 1986)

Grand Slam singles results
- Australian Open: 1R (1987, 1988)
- US Open: 3R (1983)

Doubles
- Career record: 28-48
- Career titles: 0
- Highest ranking: No. 41 (September 26, 1988)

Grand Slam doubles results
- Australian Open: 1R (1987)
- French Open: QF (1988)
- Wimbledon: 1R (1989)
- US Open: QF (1988)

Jon Levine (born September 29, 1963) is an American former professional tennis player.

== Career ==
Levine played collegiate tennis at the University of Texas, and was an All-American in 1983 and 1984. In 1984 he reached the semi-finals of the NCAA Championships, and finished the year ranked #2. He also made the round of 16 at the U.S. Pro Tennis Championships that year, with wins over Paul Annacone and Harold Solomon. In 1983 he reached the third round of the US Open, beating Victor Amaya and Peter Fleming, before losing to Ivan Lendl.

Levine won a gold medal at the 1981 Maccabiah Games in doubles with Brad Gilbert, defeating Rick Meyer of the pro tour and Paul Bernstein of Arizona State. In 1983, he won a gold medal at the Pan American Games in doubles with Eric Korita.

He lost to Michiel Schapers in the first round of the 1987 Australian Open, and was beaten by Jason Stoltenberg in the opening round of the 1988 Australian Open.

Levine made the semi-finals of the doubles event at Cleveland in 1985, the 1987 Heineken Open, the 1987 Seoul Open and Los Angeles in 1988.

In 1988, Levine was a men's doubles quarter-finalist at both the French Open and US Open. His partner in each tournament was Eric Korita.

== Challenger titles ==
=== Doubles: (3) ===
No.	Year	Tournament	Surface	Partner	Opponents in the final	Score in the final
1.	1986	San Luis Potosi, Mexico	Clay	(United States) Bud Cox	(Canada) Stephane Bonneau (Venezuela) Iñaki Calvo	7–6, 4–6, 6–4
2.	1987	Nagoya, Japan	Hard	(United Kingdom) Andrew Castle	(New Zealand) Steve Guy (New Zealand) David Mustard	7–6, 7–6
3.	1987	Jakarta, Indonesia	Hard	(New Zealand) Steve Guy	(Indonesia) Suharyadi Suharyadi (Indonesia) Donald Wailan	6–7, 6–4, 6–3

== See also ==
- List of select Jewish tennis players
