= Brett Dickinson =

American tennis player

- Full name: Brett Dickinson
- Country (sports): United States
- Born: December 4, 1962 (age 62); Atlanta, Georgia, U.S.
- Plays: Right-handed
- Prize money: $94,910

Singles
- Career record: 3–8
- Career titles: 0
- Highest ranking: No. 176 (October 5, 1987)

Doubles
- Career record: 17–37
- Career titles: 0
- Highest ranking: No. 92 (May 19, 1986)

Grand Slam doubles results
- Australian Open: 1R (1985, 1995)
- French Open: 1R (1989)
- US Open: 2R (1985)

Brett Dickinson (born December 4, 1962) is an American former professional tennis player.

== Biography ==
Dickinson was born in Atlanta, Georgia but grew up in Las Vegas, Nevada. He studied mathematics at San Jose State University in the early 1980s and played collegiate tennis, before turning professional.

His greatest achievement on tour was reaching the doubles final of the 1985 Melbourne Outdoor, a Grand Prix tournament, with Roberto Saad. The pair were defeated in the final by local pairing Darren Cahill and Peter Carter.

As a singles player he reached the quarter-finals at Auckland in 1986 and the following year won the Enugu Challenger tournament in Nigeria. He came close to upsetting Pat Cash at the 1987 WCT Tournament of Champions. He was 5–2 up in the third and deciding set before the Australian came back to win by claiming the final five games.

He competed in the main draw of the men's doubles events at the Australian Open, French Open and US Open.

For much of his tennis career he was based in Paris, France. He is now back in the United States and works as a realtor in La Jolla.

== Grand Prix career finals ==
=== Doubles: 1 (0–1) ===
Result	W/L	Date	Tournament	Surface	Partner	Opponents	Score
Loss	0–1	Dec 1985	Melbourne, Australia	Grass	(Argentina) Roberto Saad	(Australia) Darren Cahill (Australia) Peter Carter	6–7^{(3–7)}, 1–6

== Challenger titles ==
=== Singles: (1) ===
No.	Year	Tournament	Surface	Opponent	Score
1.	1987	Enugu, Nigeria	Hard	(Czechoslovakia) Stanislav Birner	2–6, 6–2, 6–4

=== Doubles: (2) ===
No.	Year	Tournament	Surface	Partner	Opponents	Score
1.	1984	Cairo, Egypt	Clay	(United States) Drew Gitlin	(United States) Marcel Freeman (United States) Tim Wilkison	7–6, 6–3
2.	1987	Guadeloupe	Hard	(Brazil) Nelson Aerts	(United States) Jonathan Canter (Belgium) Denis Langaskens	6–2, 6–3
