= Robin White (tennis) =

American tennis player (born 1963)

- Country (sports): United States
- Born: December 10, 1963 (age 62) San Diego, California, U.S.
- Height: 5 ft 4.5 in (1.64 m)
- Turned pro: 1983
- Retired: 1995
- Prize money: $1,174,349

Singles
- Career record: 197–178
- Career titles: 2
- Highest ranking: No. 15 (January 19, 1987)

Grand Slam singles results
- Australian Open: 3R (1987, 1988, 1992, 1993)
- French Open: 1R (1986, 1989)
- Wimbledon: 4R (1986)
- US Open: 4R (1985)

Doubles
- Career record: 291–166
- Career titles: 11
- Highest ranking: No. 8 (April 2, 1990)

Grand Slam doubles results
- Australian Open: SF (1990)
- Wimbledon: SF (1987)
- US Open: W (1988)

Grand Slam mixed doubles results
- Australian Open: F (1991)
- French Open: SF (1989)
- US Open: W (1989)

Robin White (born December 10, 1963) is a former professional tennis player from the United States.

White played on the WTA Tour from 1983 to 1995. She won two singles titles: in Hershey, Pennsylvania, in 1985 and in Auckland in 1992. The highlight of her career was her victory with Gigi Fernández in the US Open women's doubles in 1988. She won 11 other doubles titles, including the US Open mixed doubles in 1989 with Shelby Cannon. She was a finalist in the Australian Open mixed doubles in 1991 and reached the final of the women's doubles in 1994 with Katerina Maleeva.

White's singles record includes wins over Pam Shriver, Hana Mandlíková and Gabriela Sabatini. Her highest rankings were world No. 15 for singles and No. 8 for doubles. She currently is a full-time national coach for women's tennis for the USTA.

She is not related to Anne White, a contemporary on the WTA tour.

== Grand Slam finals ==
=== Doubles: 2 (1 title, 1 runner-up) ===
Result	Year	Championship	Surface	Partner	Opponents	Score
Win	1988	US Open	Hard	(United States) Gigi Fernández	(United States) Patty Fendick (Canada) Jill Hetherington	6–4, 6–1
Loss	1994	US Open	Hard	(Bulgaria) Katerina Maleeva	(Czech Republic) Jana Novotná (Spain) Arantxa Sánchez Vicario	6–3, 6–3

=== Mixed doubles: 2 (1 title, 1 runner-up) ===
Result	Year	Championship	Surface	Partner	Opponents	Score
Win	1989	US Open	Hard	(United States) Shelby Cannon	(United States) Meredith McGrath (United States) Rick Leach	3–6, 6–2, 7–5
Loss	1991	Australian Open	Hard	(United States) Scott Davis	(United Kingdom) Jo Durie (United Kingdom) Jeremy Bates	2–6, 6–4, 6–4
