= Melbourne Outdoor =

Defunct tennis tournament
- Tour: Grand Prix circuit
- Founded: 1983
- Abolished: 1985
- Editions: 3
- Location: Melbourne, Australia
- Surface: Grass / outdoor

The Melbourne Outdoor (also called the Victorian Open) was a short-lived men's tennis tournament played in Melbourne, Australia that was re-established from an earlier tournament, held three times from 1983 to 1985. It was part of the Grand Prix tennis circuit and was held on outdoor grass courts.

== Finals ==
=== Singles ===
Year	Champions	Runners-up	Score
1982/83	(Australia) Pat Cash	(Australia) Rod Frawley	6–4, 7–6
1984/85	(United States) Dan Cassidy	(Australia) John Fitzgerald	7–6, 7–6
1985	(United States) Jonathan Canter	(Australia) Peter Doohan	5–7, 6–3, 6–4

=== Doubles ===
Year	Champions	Runners-up	Score
1982/83	(South Africa) Eddie Edwards (United Kingdom) Jonathan Smith	(Australia) Broderick Dyke (Australia) Wayne Hampson	7–6, 6–3
1984/85	(Australia) Broderick Dyke (Australia) Wally Masur	(United States) Mike Bauer (United States) Scott McCain	6–7, 6–3, 7–6
1985	(Australia) Darren Cahill (Australia) Peter Carter	(United States) Brett Dickinson (Argentina) Roberto Saad	7–6^{(7–3)}, 6–1
