= Michael Kures =

American tennis player

- Country (sports): United States
- Residence: Willow Springs, Illinois
- Born: July 25, 1964 (age 60); Prague, Czechoslovakia
- Height: 6 ft 1 in (1.85 m)
- Plays: Right-handed
- Prize money: $59,332

Singles
- Career record: 10–23
- Career titles: 0
- Highest ranking: No. 107 (July 11, 1988)

Grand Slam singles results
- Australian Open: 1R (1989)
- Wimbledon: 1R (1987)
- US Open: 2R (1984)

Doubles
- Career record: 5–9
- Career titles: 0
- Highest ranking: No. 211 (September 17, 1984)

Grand Slam doubles results
- Australian Open: 2R (1989)

Michael Kures (born July 25, 1964) is a former professional tennis player from the United States. He was born in Czechoslovakia, but moved to the United States at age four.

== Career ==
Kures, with partner Jonathan Canter, won the boys' doubles title at the 1982 US Open. The pair had been runner-up at the French Open earlier that year.

He played collegiate tennis for the University of California, Los Angeles in the early 1980s. In 1984, he was an All-American and a member of the NCAA championship winning team. In 1985, he earned All-American honours again and made the Division I singles final, which he lost to Mikael Pernfors.

On the Grand Prix tennis circuit, Kures had his best result at the Boston Pro Championships in 1988, beating Roberto Argüello, John Ross and world number-nine Brad Gilbert, before losing to Bruno Orešar in the quarter-finals. He was a doubles semi-finalist at the 1987 Seoul Open, partnering Paul Chamberlin.

Kures competed at the US Open four times and made the second round in 1984, defeating Hans Simonsson. He was beaten by Mats Wilander in the second round. His other appearances were in 1987 and 1988, as a singles player, and 1989, in the men's doubles draw. He also competed at the 1987 Wimbledon Championships and 1989 Australian Open.

== Challenger titles ==
=== Doubles: (1) ===
No.	Year	Tournament	Surface	Partner	Opponents	Score
1.	1984	Winnetka, United States	Hard	(United States) Dan Goldie	(Chile) Ricardo Acuña (Chile) Belus Prajoux	3–6, 6–4, 7–5
