= 1984 Melbourne Outdoor =

- Date: 24–30 December
- Edition: 2nd
- Category: Grand Prix
- Draw: 32S / 16D
- Prize money: $75,000
- Surface: Grass / outdoor
- Location: Melbourne, Australia

Champions

Singles
- (United States) Dan Cassidy

Doubles
- (Australia) Broderick Dyke / (Australia) Wally Masur
- Melbourne Outdoor

The 1984 Melbourne Outdoor, also known as the Victorian Championships, was a Grand Prix men's tennis tournament held in Melbourne, Australia. It was the second edition of the tournament and was held from 24 December until 30 December 1984 and was played on outdoor grass courts. Unseeded Dan Cassidy won the singles title.

== Finals ==
=== Singles ===
(United States) Dan Cassidy defeated (Australia) John Fitzgerald 7–6, 7–6

- It was Cassidy's only singles title of his career.

=== Doubles ===
(Australia) Broderick Dyke / (Australia) Wally Masur defeated (United States) Mike Bauer / (United States) Scott McCain 7–6, 3–6, 7–6
