= Yoo Jin-sun =

South Korean tennis player

Personal information
- Nationality: South Korean
- Born: July 12, 1962 (age 63) Seocheon, Chungcheongnam-do

Korean name
- Hangul: 유진선
- Hanja: 兪鎭先
- RR: Yu Jinseon
- MR: Yu Chinsŏn
Medal record
Men's Tennis
Representing South Korea
Asian Games
Gold medal – first place	1986 Seoul	Singles
Gold medal – first place	1986 Seoul	Doubles
Gold medal – first place	1986 Seoul	Mixed doubles
Gold medal – first place	1986 Seoul	Team

Yoo Jin-sun (born July 12, 1962 in Seocheon, Chungcheongnam-do) is a former tennis player from South Korea, who represented his native country as a qualifier at the 1988 Summer Olympics in Seoul. There he was defeated in the first round by the number twelve seed from Israel, Amos Mansdorf. The right-hander reached his highest singles ATP-ranking on June 13, 1988, when he became the number 194 of the world.
