= Roberto Saad =

Argentine tennis player

- Country (sports): Argentina
- Born: 3 June 1961 (age 65) Tucuman, Argentina
- Height: 1.85 m (6 ft 1 in)
- Plays: Right-handed
- Prize money: $188,147

Singles
- Career record: 13–30
- Career titles: 0
- Highest ranking: No. 109 (23 Dec 1985)

Grand Slam singles results
- Australian Open: 3R (1985)
- French Open: 2R (1985)
- Wimbledon: 2R (1985)
- US Open: 1R (1985)

Doubles
- Career record: 44–38
- Career titles: 2
- Highest ranking: No. 36 (8 Aug 1988)

Grand Slam doubles results
- Australian Open: SF (1988)
- French Open: 2R (1988)
- Wimbledon: 1R (1986)

Roberto Saad (born 3 June 1961) is a former professional tennis player from Argentina.

Saad enjoyed most of his tennis success while playing doubles. During his career, he won two doubles titles. He achieved a career-high doubles ranking of World No. 36 in 1988.

Saad is of Lebanese descent.

== Career finals ==
=== Doubles (2 wins – 2 losses) ===
Result	W/L	Date	Tournament	Surface	Partner	Opponents	Score
Loss	0–1	Dec 1985	Melbourne Outdoor, Australia	Grass	(United States) Brett Dickinson	(Australia) Darren Cahill (Australia) Peter Carter	6–7^{(3–7)}, 1–6
Win	1–1	Apr 1988	Seoul, South Korea	Hard	(United Kingdom) Andrew Castle	(United States) Gary Donnelly (United States) Jim Grabb	6–7, 6–4, 7–6
Win	2–1	Aug 1993	Kitzbühel, Austria	Clay	(Argentina) Juan Garat	(South Africa) Marius Barnard (United States) Tom Mercer	6–4, 3–6, 6–3
Loss	2–2	Aug 1993	San Marino	Clay	(Argentina) Juan Garat	(Argentina) Daniel Orsanic (Finland) Olli Rahnasto	4–6, 6–1, 3–6
