= Eric Korita =

American tennis player

- Country (sports): United States
- Born: January 13, 1963 (age 63) Chicago, Illinois, U.S.
- Height: 6 ft 5 in (196 cm)
- Plays: Right-handed
- Prize money: $155,943

Singles
- Career record: 29–32
- Highest ranking: No. 46 (February 20, 1984)

Grand Slam singles results
- Australian Open: 1R (1983)
- French Open: 1R (1984)
- Wimbledon: 1R (1983, 1984)
- US Open: 3R (1982, 1983)

Doubles
- Career record: 46–54
- Career titles: 1
- Highest ranking: No. 30 (September 26, 1988)

Grand Slam doubles results
- Australian Open: 2R (1983)
- French Open: SF (1984)
- Wimbledon: 2R (1988)
- US Open: QF (1988)

Eric Korita (born January 13, 1963) is a former professional tennis player from the United States. He was born in Chicago, Illinois.

Korita reached a career high singles ranking of world No. 46 on February 20, 1984 and won no grand prix tour titles. He won 1 doubles title and achieved a career-high doubles ranking of world No. 30 on September 26, 1988.

Korita played college tennis at Southern Methodist University, where he was an All-American.

During his tour playing days Korita resided in San Antonio, Texas with wife Mary.

== Career finals ==
=== Doubles (1 win, 2 losses) ===
Result	W/L	Date	Tournament	Surface	Partner	Opponents	Score
Loss	0–1	Oct 1983	Cologne, West Germany	Carpet	(United States) Paul Annacone	(United States) Nick Saviano (Romania) Florin Segărceanu	3–6, 4–6
Win	1–1	Apr 1987	Seoul, South Korea	Hard	(United States) Mike Leach	(United States) Ken Flach (United States) Jim Grabb	6–7, 6–1, 7–5
Loss	1–2	Nov 1987	Johannesburg, South Africa	Hard (i)	(United States) Brad Pearce	(United States) Kevin Curren (United States) David Pate	4–6, 4–6
