= Jim Grabb =

American tennis player (born 1964)

- Country (sports): United States
- Residence: Sagaponack, New York, U.S.
- Born: April 14, 1964 (age 62) Tucson, Arizona, U.S.
- Height: 6 ft 4 in (1.93 m)
- Turned pro: 1986
- Retired: 2000
- Plays: Right-handed
- Prize money: $3,274,155

Singles
- Career record: 179–199
- Career titles: 2
- Highest ranking: No. 24 (February 12, 1990)

Grand Slam singles results
- Australian Open: 3R (1988)
- French Open: 2R (1992)
- Wimbledon: 3R (1988, 1990)
- US Open: 4R (1989)

Doubles
- Career record: 395–237
- Career titles: 23
- Highest ranking: No. 1 (June 12, 1989)

Grand Slam doubles results
- Australian Open: QF (1989, 1993, 1996)
- French Open: W (1989)
- Wimbledon: F (1992)
- US Open: W (1992)

Other doubles tournaments
- Tour Finals: W (1989)

Jim Grabb (born April 14, 1964) is an American former professional tennis player. In doubles, he won the 1989 French Open and the 1992 US Open. He was ranked the world No. 1 doubles player in both 1989 and 1993. His best singles ranking of world No. 24, he achieved in 1990.

== Tennis career ==
=== Early years ===
Grabb is Jewish, and he attended Tucson High Magnet School. Grabb was from 1984 to 1986 a three-time doubles and two-time singles all-American, helping Stanford University win the NCAA title in 1986 and finish runner-up in 1984.

In 1986, he won the annual Rafael Osuna Award, presented by college coaches for good sportsmanship and valuable contributions to the sport.

=== Professional career ===
Grabb defeated Andre Agassi at a singles tournament in Seoul, Korea in 1987 for his first career victory. He won two doubles Grand Slam events: the 1989 French Open (with Patrick McEnroe) and the 1992 US Open (with Richey Reneberg). He won 23 doubles tour titles, with 26 finals appearances. He won two tour singles titles, in 1987 at Seoul and in 1992 at Taipei. His best showing in a Grand Slam event was fourth-round appearance in the 1989 US Open.

Grabb won the men's 35 senior doubles with his tennis partner Richey Reneberg at the 2002 and 2003 US Open.

=== Davis Cup ===
He was a member of the United States Davis Cup team in 1993.

=== Hall of Fame ===
The Northern California section of the USTA inducted Grabb into its Hall of Fame in 2006.

== Grand Slam finals ==
=== Doubles (2 titles, 1 runner-up) ===
Result	Year	Championship	Surface	Partner	Opponents	Score
Win	1989	French Open	Clay	(United States) Patrick McEnroe	(Iran) Mansour Bahrami (France) Eric Winogradsky	6–4, 2–6, 6–4, 7–6^{(7–5)}
Loss	1992	Wimbledon	Grass	(United States) Richey Reneberg	(United States) John McEnroe (Germany) Michael Stich	7–5, 6–7^{(5–7)}, 6–3, 6–7^{(5–7)}, 17–19
Win	1992	US Open	Hard	(United States) Richey Reneberg	(United States) Kelly Jones (United States) Rick Leach	3–6, 7–6^{(7–2)}, 6–3, 6–3

== Career finals ==
=== Singles: 3 (2 wins / 1 loss) ===
Result	W-L	Date	Tournament	Surface	Opponents	Score
Win	1–0	Apr 1987	Seoul, South Korea	Hard	(United States) Andre Agassi	1–6, 6–4, 6–2
Loss	1–1	Jul 1990	Washington, D.C., U.S.	Hard	(United States) Andre Agassi	1–6, 4–6
Win	2–1	Oct 1992	Taipei, Taiwan	Carpet	(Australia) Jamie Morgan	6–3, 6–3

=== Doubles: 50 (23 wins / 27 losses) ===
Legend Grand Slam (2) Tennis Masters Cup (1) ATP Masters Series (1) ATP Championship Series (7) ATP World Series (12)	Titles by surface Hard (12) Clay (2) Grass (1) Carpet (8)

Result	W-L	Date	Tournament	Surface	Partner	Opponents	Score
Loss	0–1	Apr 1987	Seoul, South Korea	Hard	(United States) Ken Flach	(United States) Eric Korita (United States) Mike Leach	7–6, 1–6, 5–7
Win	1–1	Oct 1987	San Francisco, U.S.	Carpet	(United States) Patrick McEnroe	(United States) Glenn Layendecker (United States) Todd Witsken	6–2, 0–6, 6–4
Loss	1–2	Oct 1987	Tokyo Indoor, Japan	Carpet (i)	(United States) Sammy Giammalva Jr.	(Australia) Broderick Dyke (Netherlands) Tom Nijssen	3–6, 2–6
Loss	1–3	Nov 1987	Stockholm, Sweden	Hard (i)	(United States) Jim Pugh	(Sweden) Stefan Edberg (Sweden) Anders Järryd	3–6, 4–6
Loss	1–4	Jan 1988	Auckland, New Zealand	Hard	(United States) Sammy Giammalva Jr.	(United States) Marty Davis (United States) Tim Pawsat	3–6, 6–3, 4–6
Loss	1–5	Apr 1988	Seoul, South Korea	Hard	(United States) Gary Donnelly	(United Kingdom) Andrew Castle (Argentina) Roberto Saad	7–6, 4–6, 6–7
Loss	1–6	Aug 1988	Cincinnati, U.S.	Hard	(United States) Patrick McEnroe	(United States) Rick Leach (United States) Jim Pugh	2–6, 4–6
Loss	1–7	Sep 1988	Los Angeles, U.S.	Hard	(Australia) Peter Doohan	(United States) John McEnroe (Australia) Mark Woodforde	4–6, 4–6
Loss	1–8	Oct 1988	Paris Indoor, France	Carpet (i)	(South Africa) Christo van Rensburg	(United States) Paul Annacone (Australia) John Fitzgerald	2–6, 2–6
Win	2–8	Nov 1988	Stockholm, Sweden	Hard (i)	(United States) Kevin Curren	(United States) Paul Annacone (Australia) John Fitzgerald	7–5, 6–4
Loss	2–9	Apr 1989	Miami, U.S.	Hard	(United States) Patrick McEnroe	(Switzerland) Jakob Hlasek (Sweden) Anders Järryd	3–6, ret.
Win	3–9	Jun 1989	French Open, Paris	Clay	(United States) Patrick McEnroe	(Iran) Mansour Bahrami (France) Eric Winogradsky	6–4, 2–6, 6–4, 7–6
Loss	3–10	Jul 1989	Washington, D.C., U.S.	Hard	(United States) Patrick McEnroe	(United Kingdom) Neil Broad (South Africa) Gary Muller	7–6, 6–7, 4–6
Win	4–10	Dec 1989	Masters Cup, London	Carpet (i)	(United States) Patrick McEnroe	(Australia) John Fitzgerald (Sweden) Anders Järryd	7–5, 7–6, 5–7, 6–3
Loss	4–11	Mar 1990	Indian Wells, U.S.	Hard	(United States) Patrick McEnroe	(West Germany) Boris Becker (France) Guy Forget	6–4, 4–6, 3–6
Loss	4–12	May 1990	Kiawah Island, U.S.	Clay	(Mexico) Leonardo Lavalle	(United States) Scott Davis (United States) David Pate	2–6, 3–6
Loss	4–13	Jun 1990	Rosmalen, Netherlands	Grass	(United States) Patrick McEnroe	(Switzerland) Jakob Hlasek (West Germany) Michael Stich	6–7, 3–6
Loss	4–14	Oct 1990	Lyon, France	Carpet (i)	(United States) David Pate	(United States) Patrick Galbraith (United States) Kelly Jones	6–7, 4–6
Win	5–14	Nov 1990	Wembley, England	Carpet (i)	(United States) Patrick McEnroe	(United States) Rick Leach (United States) Jim Pugh	7–6, 4–6, 6–3
Win	6–14	Oct 1991	Sydney Indoor, Australia	Hard (i)	(United States) Richey Reneberg	(United States) Luke Jensen (Australia) Laurie Warder	6–4, 6–4
Win	7–14	Oct 1991	Tokyo Indoor, Japan	Carpet (i)	(United States) Richey Reneberg	(United States) Scott Davis (United States) David Pate	7–5, 2–6, 7–6
Win	8–14	Jan 1992	Auckland, New Zealand	Hard	(South Africa) Wayne Ferreira	(Canada) Grant Connell (Canada) Glenn Michibata	6–4, 6–3
Win	9–14	Feb 1992	San Francisco, U.S.	Hard (i)	(United States) Richey Reneberg	(South Africa) Pieter Aldrich (South Africa) Danie Visser	6–4, 7–5
Loss	9–15	Feb 1992	Philadelphia, U.S.	Carpet (i)	(United States) Richey Reneberg	(Australia) Todd Woodbridge (Australia) Mark Woodforde	4–6, 6–7
Win	10–15	Apr 1992	Hong Kong, U.K.	Hard	(United States) Brad Gilbert	(Zimbabwe) Byron Black (South Africa) Byron Talbot	6–2, 6–1
Win	11–15	Jun 1992	Rosmalen, Netherlands	Grass	(United States) Richey Reneberg	(United States) John McEnroe (Germany) Michael Stich	6–4, 6–7, 6–4
Loss	11–16	Jul 1992	Wimbledon, London	Grass	(United States) Richey Reneberg	(United States) John McEnroe (Germany) Michael Stich	7–5, 6–7, 6–3, 6–7, 17–19
Win	12–16	Aug 1992	Indianapolis, U.S.	Hard	(United States) Richey Reneberg	(Canada) Grant Connell (Canada) Glenn Michibata	7–6, 6–2
Win	13–16	Sep 1992	US Open, New York	Hard	(United States) Richey Reneberg	(United States) Kelly Jones (United States) Rick Leach	3–6, 7–6, 6–3, 6–3
Loss	13–17	Oct 1992	Sydney Indoor, Australia	Hard (i)	(United States) Richey Reneberg	(United States) Patrick McEnroe (United States) Jonathan Stark	2–6, 3–6
Loss	13–18	Oct 1992	Tokyo Indoor, Japan	Carpet (i)	(United States) Richey Reneberg	(Australia) Todd Woodbridge (Australia) Mark Woodforde	6–7, 4–6
Win	14–18	Feb 1993	Philadelphia, U.S.	Carpet (i)	(United States) Richey Reneberg	(South Africa) Marcos Ondruska (United States) Brad Pearce	6–7, 6–3, 6–0
Loss	14–19	Feb 1994	Memphis, U.S.	Hard (i)	(United States) Jared Palmer	(Zimbabwe) Byron Black (United States) Jonathan Stark	6–7, 4–6
Loss	14–20	Feb 1994	Philadelphia, U.S.	Carpet (i)	(United States) Jared Palmer	(Netherlands) Jacco Eltingh (Netherlands) Paul Haarhuis	3–6, 4–6
Win	15–20	Apr 1994	Hong Kong, U.K.	Hard	(New Zealand) Brett Steven	(Sweden) Jonas Björkman (Australia) Patrick Rafter	w/o
Loss	15–21	Aug 1994	Indianapolis, U.S.	Hard	(United States) Richey Reneberg	(Australia) Todd Woodbridge (Australia) Mark Woodforde	3–6, 4–6
Win	16–21	Feb 1995	San Jose, U.S.	Hard (i)	(United States) Patrick McEnroe	(United States) Alex O'Brien (Australia) Sandon Stolle	3–6, 7–5, 6–0
Win	17–21	Feb 1995	Philadelphia, U.S.	Carpet (i)	(United States) Jonathan Stark	(Netherlands) Jacco Eltingh (Netherlands) Paul Haarhuis	7–6, 6–7, 6–3
Loss	17–22	Mar 1995	Miami, U.S.	Hard	(United States) Patrick McEnroe	(Australia) Todd Woodbridge (Australia) Mark Woodforde	3–6, 6–7
Win	18–22	Oct 1995	Tel Aviv, Israel	Hard	(United States) Jared Palmer	(United States) Kent Kinnear (United States) David Wheaton	6–4, 7–5
Loss	18–23	Nov 1995	Paris Indoor, France	Carpet (i)	(United States) Todd Martin	(Canada) Grant Connell (United States) Patrick Galbraith	2–6, 2–6
Loss	18–24	Feb 1996	Shanghai, China	Carpet (i)	(Australia) Michael Tebbutt	(The Bahamas) Mark Knowles (The Bahamas) Roger Smith	6–4, 2–6, 6–7
Win	19–24	Aug 1996	Indianapolis, U.S.	Hard	(United States) Richey Reneberg	(Czech Republic) Petr Korda (Czech Republic) Cyril Suk	7–6, 4–6, 6–4
Win	20–24	Oct 1996	Lyon, France	Carpet (i)	(United States) Richey Reneberg	(United Kingdom) Neil Broad (South Africa) Piet Norval	6–2, 6–1
Loss	20–25	Oct 1997	Basel, Switzerland	Carpet (i)	(Germany) Karsten Braasch	(United Kingdom) Tim Henman (Switzerland) Marc Rosset	6–7, 7–6, 6–7
Win	21–25	Mar 1998	London, England	Carpet (i)	(Czech Republic) Martin Damm	(Russia) Yevgeny Kafelnikov (Czech Republic) Daniel Vacek	6–4, 7–5
Win	22–25	May 1998	St. Pölten, Austria	Clay	(Australia) David Macpherson	(South Africa) David Adams (Zimbabwe) Wayne Black	6–4, 6–4
Loss	22–26	Jul 1998	Stuttgart, Germany	Clay	(Australia) Joshua Eagle	(France) Olivier Delaître (France) Fabrice Santoro	1–6, 6–3, 3–6
Win	23–26	Aug 1998	Toronto, Canada	Hard	(Czech Republic) Martin Damm	(South Africa) Ellis Ferreira (United States) Rick Leach	6–7, 6–2, 7–6
Loss	23–27	Feb 2000	Memphis, U.S.	Hard (i)	(United States) Richey Reneberg	(United States) Justin Gimelstob (Canada) Sébastien Lareau	2–6, 4–6

== Doubles performance timeline ==
Key
W	F	SF	QF	#R	RR	Q#	DNQ	A	NH

(W) winner; (F) finalist; (SF) semifinalist; (QF) quarterfinalist; (#R) rounds 4, 3, 2, 1; (RR) round-robin stage; (Q#) qualification round; (DNQ) did not qualify; (A) absent; (NH) not held; (SR) strike rate (events won / competed); (W–L) win–loss record.

Tournament	1984	1985	1986	1987	1988	1989	1990	1991	1992	1993	1994	1995	1996	1997	1998	1999	2000	Career SR	Career W-L
Grand Slam tournaments
Australian Open	A	A	NH	A	1R	QF	A	A	2R	QF	1R	A	QF	3R	2R	1R	A	0 / 9	11–9
French Open	A	A	A	A	A	W	SF	1R	QF	A	1R	QF	3R	3R	3R	1R	A	1 / 10	22–9
Wimbledon	A	A	A	1R	SF	3R	3R	1R	F	A	A	1R	3R	SF	3R	2R	A	0 / 11	21–11
US Open	2R	A	A	1R	3R	2R	A	1R	W	A	1R	1R	A	SF	QF	2R	A	1 / 11	18–10
Grand Slam SR	0 / 1	0 / 0	0 / 0	0 / 2	0 / 3	1 / 4	0 / 2	0 / 3	1 / 4	0 / 1	0 / 3	0 / 3	0 / 3	0 / 4	0 / 4	0 / 4	0 / 0	2 / 41	N/A
Annual win–loss	1–1	0–0	0–0	0–2	5–3	11–3	6–2	0–3	15–3	3–1	0–3	3–3	6–3	12–4	8–4	2–4	0–0	N/A	72–39
ATP Masters Series
Indian Wells	These tournaments were not Masters Series events before 1990.						F	SF	A	QF	2R	1R	QF	2R	2R	2R	A	0 / 9	13–9
Miami	These tournaments were not Masters Series events before 1990.						A	2R	A	A	2R	F	QF	A	3R	2R	1R	0 / 7	9–7
Monte Carlo	These tournaments were not Masters Series events before 1990.						A	A	A	A	A	A	A	A	1R	A	A	0 / 1	0–1
Rome	These tournaments were not Masters Series events before 1990.						1R	A	A	A	A	A	A	2R	1R	1R	A	0 / 4	1–4
Hamburg	These tournaments were not Masters Series events before 1990.						A	A	A	A	A	A	A	1R	2R	1R	A	0 / 3	0–3
Canada	These tournaments were not Masters Series events before 1990.						A	2R	QF	A	2R	2R	A	A	W	QF	A	1 / 6	9–5
Cincinnati	These tournaments were not Masters Series events before 1990.						A	2R	QF	A	2R	1R	2R	1R	2R	1R	A	0 / 8	5–8
Stuttgart (Stockholm)	These tournaments were not Masters Series events before 1990.						1R	A	A	A	A	2R	SF	2R	2R	A	A	0 / 5	4–5
Paris	These tournaments were not Masters Series events before 1990.						QF	1R	SF	A	1R	F	2R	1R	2R	A	A	0 / 8	9–8
Masters Series SR	N/A						0 / 4	0 / 5	0 / 3	0 / 1	0 / 5	0 / 6	0 / 5	0 / 6	1 / 9	0 / 6	0 / 1	1 / 51	N/A
Annual win–loss	N/A						5–4	5–5	4–3	1–1	4–5	8–6	9–5	3–6	8–8	3–6	0–1	N/A	50–50
Year-end ranking	167	406	268	28	13	9	24	22	3	116	36	15	25	32	15	85	208	N/A	

== Miscellaneous ==
Grabb was ranked 17th on Sports Illustrated's list of Arizona's 50 Greatest Sports Figures of the 20th century. He served as vice president of the ATP Tour Player Council in 1998–99.

Grabb married Sarah Stenn in 2002 in California. While on tour he resided, at least for a time, in Hermosa Beach, California.

== See also ==
- List of select Jewish tennis players
