= Andrew Castle =

British broadcaster and tennis player (born 1963)

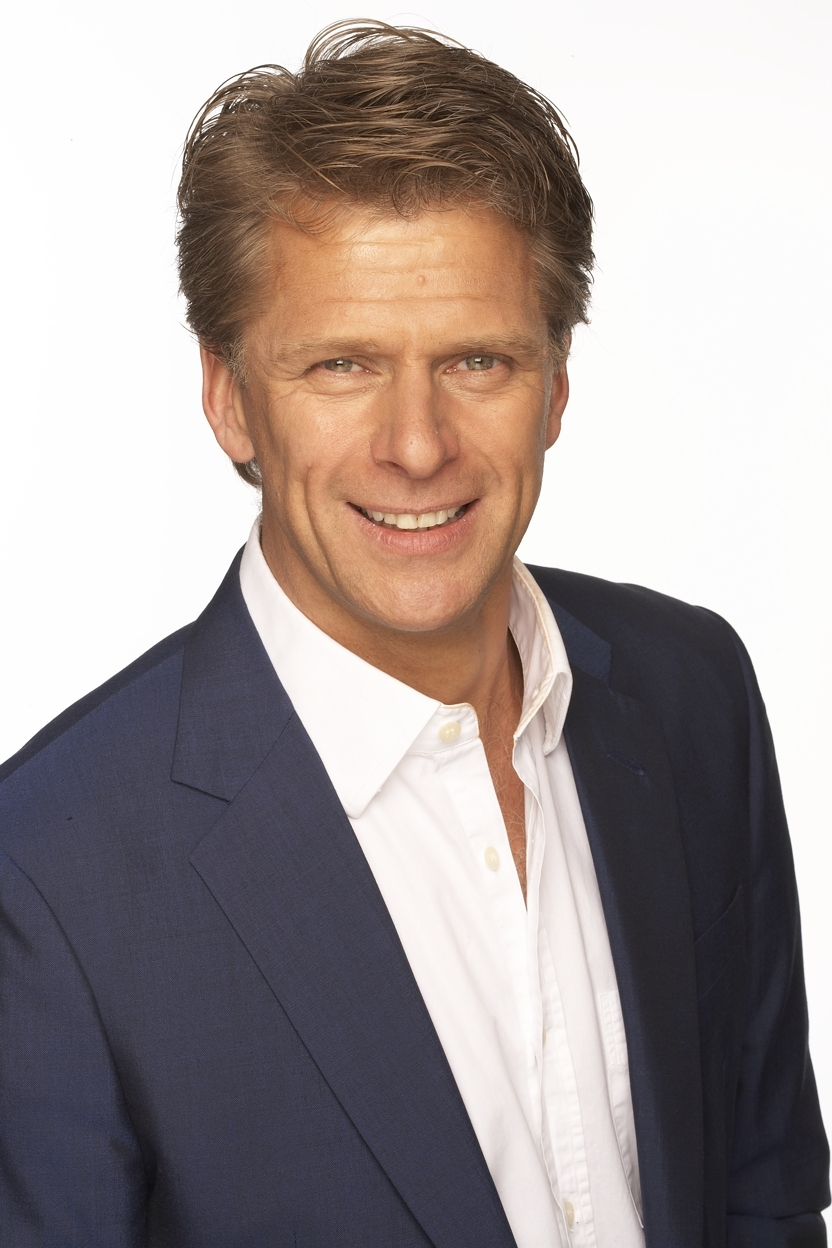
- Castle in 2009
- Country (sports): (United Kingdom) Great Britain
- Born: 15 November 1963 (age 62) Epsom, Surrey, England
- Height: 6 ft 3 in (1.91 m)
- Turned pro: 1986
- Retired: 1992
- Plays: Right-handed (one-handed backhand)
- Prize money: $344,337

Singles
- Career record: 22–57 (27.85% at ATP Tour, Grand Prix tour, WCT tour, and Grand Slam level, and in Davis Cup)
- Career titles: 0
- Highest ranking: No. 80 (13 June 1988)

Grand Slam singles results
- Australian Open: 1R (1987, 1988, 1991)
- Wimbledon: 2R (1986, 1987)
- US Open: 3R (1987)

Other tournaments
- Olympic Games: 2R (1988)

Doubles
- Career record: 63–70 (at ATP Tour, Grand Prix tour, WCT tour, and Grand Slam level, and in Davis Cup)
- Career titles: 3
- Highest ranking: No. 45 (19 December 1988)

Grand Slam doubles results
- Australian Open: SF (1988)
- French Open: 3R (1987)
- Wimbledon: 2R (1986, 1987)
- US Open: QF (1990)

Mixed doubles
- Career titles: 0

Grand Slam mixed doubles results
- Australian Open: F (1987)
- Last updated on: 25 October 2012.

Andrew Nicholas Castle (born 15 November 1963) is a British broadcaster and former tennis player. Castle was Great Britain's number 1 in singles tennis in 1986, reaching World No. 80 in June 1988, and No. 45 in doubles in December 1988, with Tim Wilkison of the United States.

Castle reached one Grand Slam final in his career in the 1987 Australian Open mixed doubles event with Anne Hobbs. He won three ATP titles in men's doubles, as well as one title on the Challenger tour.

Between 2000 and 2010, Castle was a presenter on the now defunct ITV breakfast programme GMTV, sharing duties with Ben Shephard to present its weekday magazine programme. In 2009, he began presenting the ITV daytime game show Divided. In 2013, Castle began presenting for talk radio station LBC, leaving the station in 2023.

He has also taken part in Strictly Come Dancing and 71 Degrees North.

== Early life ==
Castle was born in Epsom, Surrey. His mother, Lavinia Pollock (the great-grandchild of Annie Besant), married Frank Castle in April 1953. Andrew was born in 1963. Castle won a tennis scholarship to Millfield School in Somerset but at 15 his parents separated and he had to leave. Another scholarship sent him to Kansas. He taught tennis at the Wichita Racquet Club to both children and adults.

Castle's father ran a fishmonger's in Westerham, Kent. He went on to own shops in North Cheam; Norbury; Stoneleigh, Surrey; and owned a fish and chip shop in Taunton, Somerset.

== Tennis career ==
Castle became a professional tennis player in 1986, after completing a marketing degree whilst on an athletic scholarship in the United States. During his playing career, he was regularly ranked number one in Great Britain. In 1986 Castle reached the third round at Queens Club. He won three tour doubles titles, and was a mixed doubles finalist at the 1987 Australian Open. His 1987 run at the US Open was his best career singles performance at a Grand Slam event, when he reached the third round by defeating David Pate and Jimmy Brown, before losing to Boris Becker in four sets. He represented Britain at the Seoul Olympic Games of 1988, and the Barcelona Olympic Games of 1992. Castle was a regular member of the British Davis Cup team and the European Cup team. His career-high rankings were World No. 80 in singles and No. 45 in doubles.

Castle represents Surrey at squash at over-45s level, and continues to play representative tennis around the world.

=== Singles: 1 (1 runner-up) ===
Result	W/L	Date	Tournament	Surface	Opponent	Score
Loss	0–1	Apr 1988	Seoul Open, South Korea	Hard	(United States) Dan Goldie	3–6, 7–6^{(7–5)}, 0–6

=== Doubles: 5 (3 titles / 2 runners-up) ===
Result	W/L	Date	Tournament	Surface	Partner	Opponents	Score
Win	1–0	Apr 1988	Seoul Open, South Korea	Hard	(Argentina) Roberto Saad	(United States) Gary Donnelly; (United States) Jim Grabb	6–7, 6–4, 7–6
Loss	1–1	Aug 1988	Toronto, Canada	Hard	(United States) Tim Wilkison	(United States) Ken Flach; (United States) Robert Seguso	6–7^{(3–7)}, 3–6
Win	2–1	Aug 1988	Rye Brook, US	Hard	(United States) Tim Wilkison	(United Kingdom) Jeremy Bates; (Denmark) Michael Mortensen	4–6, 7–5, 7–6
Win	3–1	Jan 1990	Adelaide, Australia	Hard	(Nigeria) Nduka Odizor	(Germany) Alexander Mronz; (Netherlands) Michiel Schapers	7–6, 6–2
Loss	3–2	Jun 1991	Manchester, England	Grass	(United Kingdom) Nick Brown	(Italy) Omar Camporese; (Socialist Federal Republic of Yugoslavia) Goran Ivanišević	4–6, 3–6

=== Mixed doubles: 1 (1 runner-up) ===
Result	Date	Tournament	Surface	Partner	Opponents	Score
Loss	1987	Australian Open	Grass	(United Kingdom) Anne Hobbs	(United States) Zina Garrison (United States) Sherwood Stewart	6–3, 6–7^{(5–7)}, 3–6

== Media career ==
After retiring from professional tennis in 1992, Castle served as a commentator and presenter for BSkyB. As well as tennis, he presented basketball, motor racing and golf for Sky.

He joined GMTV in September 2000 as a presenter. After a decade, it was announced in June 2010 he was to leave the programme. Castle presented the final broadcast of GMTV on 3 September 2010.

He is a member of the BAFTA-nominated BBC tennis team, covering Wimbledon, the Aegon Championships at Queen's Club, the French Open, Australian Open and the Davis Cup. Castle was lead commentator on all men's singles finals from 2003 to 2026, working alongside John McEnroe, Boris Becker, Jimmy Connors, Tim Henman and John Lloyd. In June 2026, it was announced that year's Wimbledon would be Castle's final one working for the BBC after 23 years.

In 2005, he presented the quiz show Perseverance; he presented two series of the teatime game show Divided (2009–2010); and appeared on Beat the Star on 24 May 2009 – all on ITV. He took part in ITV programme 71 Degrees North in 2010.

Castle previously presented the breakfast show on Smooth Radio and continued on the station with The Great American Songbook on Sunday evenings until 2019. He presented a weekend breakfast show on talk radio station LBC until November 2023, when he was replaced by Matthew Wright.

He has also been the face of television adverts for personal injury experts First4Lawyers.

=== Strictly Come Dancing ===
Castle competed in the sixth series of the celebrity dance competition, Strictly Come Dancing. His partner was Ola Jordan. Castle's appearance marked the third time a main GMTV presenter had participated in the show. After week 4, he was placed 11th out of the remaining 12 contestants, with an average score of 22.5/40. Castle was voted out after round 7 of the competition on 2 November 2008. He scored 21 points for his samba, which placed him second from bottom on the judges' leader board. He appeared in the dance-off with Heather Small, who was saved by all four of the judges.

Week #	Dance/Song	Judges' score					Result
Week #	Dance/Song	Horwood	Phillips	Goodman	Tonioli	Total	Result
1	Cha-Cha-Cha / "Mercy"	4	6	7	6	23	Safe
3	Tango / "20th Century Boy"	4	6	7	5	22	Safe
5	American Smooth / "You Know I'm No Good"	3	4	5	5	17	Safe
6	Viennese Waltz / "Annie's Song"	5	6	7	6	24	Bottom Two
7	Samba / "Ain't it Funny"	4	5	7	5	21	Eliminated

== Personal life ==
Castle married Sophia Runham in May 1991. They have two daughters, including musical theatre actress Georgina. He is the father-in-law of actor Simon Lipkin, Georgina's husband.

He is the great-great-grandson of Annie Besant, a prominent socialist, women's rights activist, and supporter of Irish and Indian self-rule.
