= 1988 Fernleaf Classic – Doubles =

Doubles
- 1988 Fernleaf Classic

Final
- Champions: (United States) Patty Fendick (Canada) Jill Hetherington
- Runners-up: (New Zealand) Belinda Cordwell (New Zealand) Julie Richardson
- Score: 6–3, 6–3

Events
| Singles | Doubles |
| Fernleaf Classic | · 1989 → |

Patty Fendick and Jill Hetherington won in the final 6–3, 6–3 against Belinda Cordwell and Julie Richardson.

== Seeds ==
Champion seeds are indicated in bold text while text in italics indicates the round in which those seeds were eliminated. All eight seeded teams received byes into the second round.

1. (Australia) Jenny Byrne / (Australia) Michelle Jaggard (quarterfinals)
2. (United States) Gretchen Magers / (Australia) Anne Minter (semifinals)
3. (New Zealand) Belinda Cordwell / (New Zealand) Julie Richardson (final)
4. (United States) **Patty Fendick** / (Canada) **Jill Hetherington (champions)**
5. (United States) Beverly Bowes / (United States) Terry Phelps (quarterfinals)
6. (Australia) Louise Field / (United Kingdom) Julie Salmon (semifinals)
7. (United States) Katrina Adams / (Australia) Lisa O'Neill (quarterfinals)
8. (United States) Jenni Goodling / (United States) Wendy Wood (quarterfinals)

== Draw ==
=== Key ===
- Q = Qualifier
- WC = Wild card
- LL = Lucky loser
- Alt = Alternate
- SE = Special exempt
- PR = Protected ranking
- ITF = ITF entry
- JE = Junior exempt
- w/o = Walkover
- r = Retired
- d = Defaulted
- SR = Special ranking

=== Final ===
| Final |
| 4 | (United States) **Patty Fendick** (Canada) **Jill Hetherington** | **6** | **6** |
| 3 | (New Zealand) Belinda Cordwell (New Zealand) Julie Richardson | 3 | 3 |

=== Top half ===
First round
(Hong Kong) P Moreno (Japan) A Nishiya | 3 | 3
(New Zealand) **E Daly** (Australia) **R Lamb** | **6** | **6**
(Japan) **Y Koizumi** (United States) **S Norris** | **7** | **6**
(Sweden) H Dahlström (Austria) H Sprung | 6 | 1
(Netherlands) **S Schilder** (New Zealand) **R Seeman** | **6** | **6**
(United Kingdom) T Catlin (United Kingdom) K Rickett | 2 | 4
(United Kingdom) V Lake (United Kingdom) C Wood | **6** | 1 | 0
(Netherlands) **Y der Kinderen** (United States) **P Jung** | 1 | **6** | **6**

Second round
1 | (Australia) **J Byrne** (Australia) **M Jaggard** | **6** | **6**
(New Zealand) E Daly (Australia) R Lamb | 3 | 2
(Japan) Y Koizumi (United States) S Norris | 2 | 1
6 | (Australia) **L Field** (United Kingdom) **J Salmon** | **6** | **6**
4 | (United States) **P Fendick** (Canada) **J Hetherington** | **6** | **6**
(Netherlands) S Schilder (New Zealand) R Seeman | 1 | 1
(Netherlands) Y der Kinderen (United States) P Jung | **6** | 4 | 4
7 | (United States) **K Adams** (Australia) **L O'Neill** | 1 | **6** | **6**

Quarterfinals
1 | (Australia) J Byrne (Australia) M Jaggard
6 | (Australia) **L Field** (United Kingdom) **J Salmon** | **w/o**
4 | (United States) **P Fendick** (Canada) **J Hetherington** | **6** | **6**
7 | (United States) K Adams (Australia) L O'Neill | 3 | 0

Semifinals
6 | (Australia) L Field (United Kingdom) J Salmon | 4 | 2
4 | (United States) **P Fendick** (Canada) **J Hetherington** | **6** | **6**

=== Bottom half ===
First round
(United States) **L Bartlett** (United States) **C Christian** | **6** | **6**
(United States) P Casale (United Kingdom) A Croft | 4 | 1
(Australia) K Staunton (New Zealand) C Toleafoa | 4 | 6
(Switzerland) **C Cohen** (Peru) **P Vásquez** | **6** | **7**
(United States) **S Savides** (United States) **E Smith** | **6** | **6**
(Israel) I Berger (United States) J Thomas | 2 | 2
(United States) **J Golder** (United States) **K Steinmetz** | **6** | **6**
(United States) J Blackstad (Australia) S McCann | 2 | 1

Second round
8 | (United States) **J Goodling** (United States) **W Wood** | **6** | 6 | **6**
(United States) L Bartlett (United States) C Christian | 4 | **7** | 1
(Switzerland) C Cohen (Peru) P Vásquez | 5 | 4
3 | (New Zealand) **B Cordwell** (New Zealand) **J Richardson** | **7** | **6**
5 | (United States) **B Bowes** (United States) **T Phelps** | **6** | **6**
(United States) S Savides (United States) E Smith | 0 | 0
(United States) J Golder (United States) K Steinmetz | 2 | 2
2 | (United States) **G Magers** (Australia) **A Minter** | **6** | **6**

Quarterfinals
8 | (United States) J Goodling (United States) W Wood | **7** | 4 | 0
3 | (New Zealand) **B Cordwell** (New Zealand) **J Richardson** | 5 | **6** | **6**
5 | (United States) B Bowes (United States) T Phelps | 4 | **6** | 6
2 | (United States) **G Magers** (Australia) **A Minter** | **6** | 0 | **7**

Semifinals
3 | (New Zealand) **B Cordwell** (New Zealand) **J Richardson** | **6** | 1 | **7**
2 | (United States) G Magers (Australia) A Minter | 4 | **6** | 5
