= 1989 Fernleaf Classic – Singles =

Singles
- 1989 Fernleaf Classic
- 1988 Champion: (Canada) Jill Hetherington

Final
- Champion: (Spain) Conchita Martínez
- Runner-up: (Australia) Jo-Anne Faull
- Score: 6–1, 6–2

Events
Singles	Doubles
← 1988 ·	Fernleaf Classic	· 1990 →

Jill Hetherington was the defending champion but did not compete that year.

Conchita Martínez won in the final 6–1, 6–2 against Jo-Anne Faull.

== Seeds ==
A champion seed is indicated in bold text while text in italics indicates the round in which that seed was eliminated.

1. (Spain) **Conchita Martínez (champion)**
2. (New Zealand) Belinda Cordwell (quarterfinals)
3. (United States) Halle Cioffi (quarterfinals)
4. n/a
5. (Belgium) Sandra Wasserman (semifinals)
6. (West Germany) Wiltrud Probst (first round)
7. (United States) Donna Faber (second round)
8. (Sweden) Maria Strandlund (second round)

== Draw ==
=== Key ===
- Q = Qualifier
- WC = Wild card
- LL = Lucky loser
- Alt = Alternate
- SE = Special exempt
- PR = Protected ranking
- ITF = ITF entry
- JE = Junior exempt
- w/o = Walkover
- r = Retired
- d = Defaulted
- SR = Special ranking

First round
1	(Spain) **C Martínez**	**6**	**6**
(Sweden) C Dahlman	3	2
(Australia) **L Field**	**7**	**7**
Q	(Luxembourg) K Kschwendt	5	6
(Switzerland) S Jaquet	**6**	4	0
(United States) **A Ivan**	4	**6**	**6**
(Australia) **E Smylie**	**6**	**6**
6	(West Germany) W Probst	1	2
LL	(West Germany) A Betzner	1	3
(Australia) **M Jaggard**	**6**	**6**
(United States) **L-A Eldredge**	**6**	3	**6**
(Sweden) J Jonerup	3	**6**	4
Q	(Hong Kong) P Hy	4	5
(West Germany) **M Pawlik**	**6**	**7**
Q	(United States) L Bartlett	**6**	0	3
7	(United States) **D Faber**	2	**6**	**6**
8	(Sweden) **M Strandlund**	6	**6**	**6**
(West Germany) S Auer	**7**	2	2
(West Germany) V Martinek	1	2
(Australia) **J-A Faull**	**6**	**6**
(United Kingdom) **C Wood**	2	**6**	**6**
(West Germany) C Porwik	**6**	1	4
(New Zealand) C Toleafoa	3	5
3	(United States) **H Cioffi**	**6**	**7**
5	(Belgium) **S Wasserman**	**6**	**6**
(New Zealand) R Seeman	2	1
(Netherlands) S Schilder	**6**	6	4
Q	(United Kingdom) **A Grunfeld**	2	**7**	**6**
(Australia) **R McQuillan**	**6**	**7**
(United States) K Keil	2	5
(Switzerland) C Cohen	2	4
2	(New Zealand) **B Cordwell**	**6**	**6**

Second round
1	(Spain) **C Martínez**	**6**	**6**
(Australia) L Field	2	0
(United States) A Ivan	3	3
(Australia) **E Smylie**	**6**	**6**
(Australia) M Jaggard	**7**	5	1
(United States) **L-A Eldredge**	5	**7**	**6**
(West Germany) **M Pawlik**	**6**	5	**6**
7	(United States) D Faber	4	**7**	4
8	(Sweden) M Strandlund	2	0
(Australia) **J-A Faull**	**6**	**6**
(United Kingdom) C Wood	**7**	2	3
3	(United States) **H Cioffi**	5	**6**	**6**
5	(Belgium) **S Wasserman**	**7**	**6**
Q	(United Kingdom) A Grunfeld	5	1
(Australia) R McQuillan	3	1
2	(New Zealand) **B Cordwell**	**6**	**6**

Quarterfinals
1	(Spain) **C Martínez**	**6**	**6**
(Australia) E Smylie	3	1
(United States) **L-A Eldredge**	**7**	**6**
(West Germany) M Pawlik	5	2
(Australia) **J-A Faull**	**6**	**6**
3	(United States) H Cioffi	3	3
5	(Belgium) **S Wasserman**	6	**7**	**6**
2	(New Zealand) B Cordwell	**7**	5	3

Semifinals
1	(Spain) **C Martínez**	**6**	2	**6**
(United States) L-A Eldredge	3	**6**	1
(Australia) **J-A Faull**	**6**	**6**
5	(Belgium) S Wasserman	4	2

Final
1	(Spain) **Conchita Martínez**	**6**	**6**
(Australia) Jo-Anne Faull	1	2
