= 1988 Fernleaf Classic – Singles =

Singles
- 1988 Fernleaf Classic

Final
- Champion: (Canada) Jill Hetherington
- Runner-up: (United States) Katrina Adams
- Score: 6–2, 6–1

Events
Singles	Doubles
- Fernleaf Classic

Jill Hetherington won in the final 6–2, 6–1 against Katrina Adams.

== Seeds ==
A champion seed is indicated in bold text while text in italics indicates the round in which that seed was eliminated. The top eight seeds received a bye to the second round.

1. (United States) Patty Fendick (semifinals)
2. (Australia) Anne Minter (semifinals)
3. (United States) Terry Phelps (quarterfinals)
4. (United States) Gretchen Magers (quarterfinals)
5. (United States) Beverly Bowes (third round)
6. (Australia) Elizabeth Minter (third round)
7. (United Kingdom) Sara Gomer (second round)
8. (New Zealand) Belinda Cordwell (quarterfinals)
9. (United States) Pam Casale (second round)
10. (Greece) Angeliki Kanellopoulou (first round)
11. (Australia) Louise Field (second round)
12. (France) Marie-Christine Calleja (second round)
13. (Canada) **Jill Hetherington (champion)**
14. (United Kingdom) Annabel Croft (third round)
15. n/a
16. n/a

== Draw ==
Key

- Q = Qualifier
- WC = Wild card
- LL = Lucky loser
- Alt = Alternate
- ITF = ITF entry
- PR = Protected ranking
- SR = Special ranking
- SE = Special exempt
- JE = Junior exempt
- JR = Junior Accelerator Programme entrant
- CO = College Accelerator Programme entrant
- NG = Next Gen Accelerator Program entrant
- w/o = Walkover
- r = Retired
- d = Defaulted

=== Finals ===
Semifinals
1	(United States) Patty Fendick	**6**	6	4
(United States) **Katrina Adams**	3	**7**	**6**
13	(Canada) **Jill Hetherington**	**7**	2	**6**
2	(Australia) Anne Minter	5	**6**	4

Final
(United States) Katrina Adams	1	1
13	(Canada) **Jill Hetherington**	**6**	**6**

=== Top half ===
==== Section 1 ====
First round
(United Kingdom) L Pennington	3	2
(United States) **L Bartlett**	**6**	**6**
(New Zealand) **J Richardson**	**7**	**6**
(United States) J Thomas	6	1
(United States) E Smith	1	2
12	(France) **M-C Calleja**	**6**	**6**
(United States) **S Norris**	2	**6**	**6**
(Netherlands) C Bakkum	**6**	3	4
(Netherlands) **S Schilder**	**6**	**6**
(Australia) J Byrne	2	2
(United Kingdom) **C Wood**	**6**	**6**
(Netherlands) M van der Torre	1	3

Second round
1	(United States) **P Fendick**	**6**	**6**
(United States) L Bartlett	4	2
(New Zealand) **J Richardson**	**6**	**6**
12	(France) M-C Calleja	2	2
(United States) S Norris	1	0
(Netherlands) **S Schilder**	**6**	**6**
(United Kingdom) **C Wood**	**6**	**6**
7	(United Kingdom) S Gomer	3	3

Third round
1	(United States) **P Fendick**	**6**	**6**
(New Zealand) J Richardson	2	3
(Netherlands) **S Schilder**	6	**6**	**6**
(United Kingdom) C Wood	**7**	2	0

Quarterfinals
1	(United States) **P Fendick**	**6**	**6**
(Netherlands) S Schilder	1	3

==== Section 2 ====
First round
(Netherlands) Y der Kinderen	**6**	1	0
(New Zealand) **C Toleafoa**	3	**6**	**6**
(United States) P Jung	5	4
(Japan) **A Nishiya**	**7**	**6**
(France) S Niox-Chateau	2	4
14	(United Kingdom) **A Croft**	**6**	**6**
10	(Greece) A Kanellopoulou	1	5
(United States) **K Adams**	**6**	**7**
(United States) **J Golder**	2	**6**	**7**
(New Zealand) R Seeman	**6**	3	6
(United States) J Goodling	3	2
(United Kingdom) **S Loosemore**	**6**	**6**

Second round
3	(United States) **T Phelps**	**6**	**6**
(New Zealand) C Toleafoa	1	3
(Japan) A Nishiya	**7**	5	6
14	(United Kingdom) **A Croft**	5	**7**	**7**
(United States) **K Adams**	**6**	**6**
(United States) J Golder	2	1
(United Kingdom) S Loosemore	3	3
6	(Australia) **E Minter**	**6**	**6**

Third round
3	(United States) **T Phelps**	**7**	**6**
14	(United Kingdom) A Croft	6	3
(United States) **K Adams**	**6**	**6**
6	(Australia) E Minter	3	1

Quarterfinals
3	(United States) T Phelps	2	**6**	5
(United States) **K Adams**	**6**	2	**7**

=== Bottom half ===
==== Section 3 ====
First round
(New Zealand) **E Daly**	1	**6**	**6**
(United Kingdom) V Lake	**6**	4	3
(Netherlands) **N Jagerman**	4	**6**	**6**
(Peru) P Vásquez	**6**	3	4
(United States) P Smith	2	**6**	0
13	(Canada) **J Hetherington**	**6**	4	**6**
9	(United States) **P Casale**	**6**	**6**
(Hong Kong) P Moreno	0	3
(Australia) **M Jaggard**	**6**	**6**
(Japan) Y Koizumi	1	4
(Australia) L O'Neill	2	**6**	5
(Canada) **M Drake**	**6**	1	**7**

Second round
5	(United States) **B Bowes**	**6**	**6**
(New Zealand) E Daly	0	1
(Netherlands) N Jagerman	3	4
13	(Canada) **J Hetherington**	**6**	**6**
9	(United States) P Casale	5	4
(Australia) **M Jaggard**	**7**	**6**
(Canada) M Drake	1	6
4	(United States) **G Magers**	**6**	**7**

Third round
5	(United States) B Bowes	3	6
13	(Canada) **J Hetherington**	**6**	**7**
(Australia) M Jaggard	0	4
4	(United States) **G Magers**	**6**	**6**

Quarterfinals
13	(Canada) **J Hetherington**	**6**	**6**
4	(United States) G Magers	4	3

==== Section 4 ====
First round
(United Kingdom) J Salmon	**6**	4	2
(United States) **C Christian**	4	**6**	**6**
(Austria) H Sprung	2	**7**	0
(Sweden) **M Lindström**	**6**	6	**6**
(France) L Vanhille	0	0
11	(Australia) **L Field**	**6**	**6**
(United Kingdom) M Javer	**6**	6	1
(United Kingdom) **T Catlin**	2	**7**	**6**
(Switzerland) C Cohen	4	**6**	4
(United States) **K Steinmetz**	**6**	2	**6**
(Israel) **I Berger**	4	**6**	**6**
(Australia) K Staunton	**6**	2	3

Second round
8	(New Zealand) **B Cordwell**	**6**	**6**
(United States) C Christian	3	2
(Sweden) **H Dahlström**	**7**	**6**
11	(Australia) L Field	5	4
(United Kingdom) T Catlin	3	1
(United States) **K Steinmetz**	**6**	**6**
(Israel) I Berger	**7**	1	2
2	(Australia) **A Minter**	6	**6**	**6**

Third round
8	(New Zealand) **B Cordwell**	**6**	6	**6**
(Sweden) H Dahlström	2	**7**	4
(United States) K Steinmetz	4	1
2	(Australia) **A Minter**	**6**	**6**

Quarterfinals
8	(New Zealand) B Cordwell	4	**6**	3
2	(Australia) **A Minter**	**6**	4	**6**
