= 1989 Fernleaf Classic – Doubles =

Doubles
- 1989 Fernleaf Classic
- 1988 Champions: (United States) Patty Fendick (Canada) Jill Hetherington

Final
- Champions: (Australia) Elizabeth Smylie (Australia) Janine Tremelling
- Runners-up: (Australia) Tracey Morton (Austria) Heidi Sprung
- Score: 7–6, 6–1

Events
Singles	Doubles
← 1988 ·	Fernleaf Classic	· 1990 →

Patty Fendick and Jill Hetherington were the defending champions. However, they

did not compete that year.

Elizabeth Smylie and Janine Tremelling won in the final 7–6, 6–1 against Tracey Morton and Heidi Sprung.

== Seeds ==
Champion seeds are indicated in bold text while text in italics indicates the round in which those seeds were eliminated.

1. (Australia) **Elizabeth Smylie** / (Australia) **Janine Tremelling (champions)**
2. (Australia) Louise Field / (Australia) Michelle Jaggard (first round)
3. (Australia) Jo-Anne Faull / (Australia) Rachel McQuillan (semifinals)
4. (Netherlands) Simone Schilder / (United Kingdom) Clare Wood (quarterfinals)

== Draw ==
=== Key ===
- Q = Qualifier
- WC = Wild card
- LL = Lucky loser
- Alt = Alternate
- SE = Special exempt
- PR = Protected ranking
- ITF = ITF entry
- JE = Junior exempt
- w/o = Walkover
- r = Retired
- d = Defaulted
- SR = Special ranking

First round
1	(Australia) **E Smylie** (Australia) **J Tremelling**	**6**	**6**
(Switzerland) C Cohen (Switzerland) S Jaquet	1	1
(United Kingdom) A Grunfeld (Netherlands) H ter Riet	4	1
(United States) **L Bartlett** (United States) **H Cioffi**	**6**	**6**
3	(Australia) **J-A Faull** (Australia) **R McQuillan**	**6**	**6**
(Sweden) M Ekstrand (Sweden) J Jonerup	2	2
(West Germany) **A Betzner** (West Germany) **W Probst**	**6**	**6**
(United States) D Faber (West Germany) V Martinek	0	3
(United States) E Galphin (United Kingdom) A Simpkin	**7**	3	3
(New Zealand) **R Seeman** (New Zealand) **C Toleafoa**	6	**6**	**6**
(United States) J Fuchs (Sweden) M Strandlund	1	**6**	6
4	(Netherlands) **S Schilder** (United Kingdom) **C Wood**	**6**	4	**7**
(Luxembourg) **K Kschwendt** (Spain) **C Martínez**	**6**	**6**
(Hong Kong) P Moreno (West Germany) M Pawlik	2	2
(Australia) **T Morton** (Austria) **H Sprung**	**6**	**6**
2	(Australia) L Field (Australia) M Jaggard	4	4

Quarterfinals
1	(Australia) **E Smylie** (Australia) **J Tremelling**	**6**	**6**
(United States) L Bartlett (United States) H Cioffi	1	3
3	(Australia) **J-A Faull** (Australia) **R McQuillan**	**6**	**7**
(West Germany) A Betzner (West Germany) W Probst	3	5
(New Zealand) **R Seeman** (New Zealand) **C Toleafoa**	**6**	4	**7**
4	(Netherlands) S Schilder (United Kingdom) C Wood	3	**6**	6
(Luxembourg) K Kschwendt (Spain) C Martínez	6	**6**	4
(Australia) **T Morton** (Austria) **H Sprung**	**7**	4	**6**

Semifinals
1	(Australia) **E Smylie** (Australia) **J Tremelling**	**6**	**6**
3	(Australia) J-A Faull (Australia) R McQuillan	0	2
(New Zealand) R Seeman (New Zealand) C Toleafoa	4	4
(Australia) **T Morton** (Austria) **H Sprung**	**6**	**6**

Final
1	(Australia) **Elizabeth Smylie** (Australia) **Janine Tremelling**	**7**	**6**
(Australia) Tracey Morton (Austria) Heidi Sprung	6	1
