= 1989 Virginia Slims World Championship Series =

Women's tennis circuit

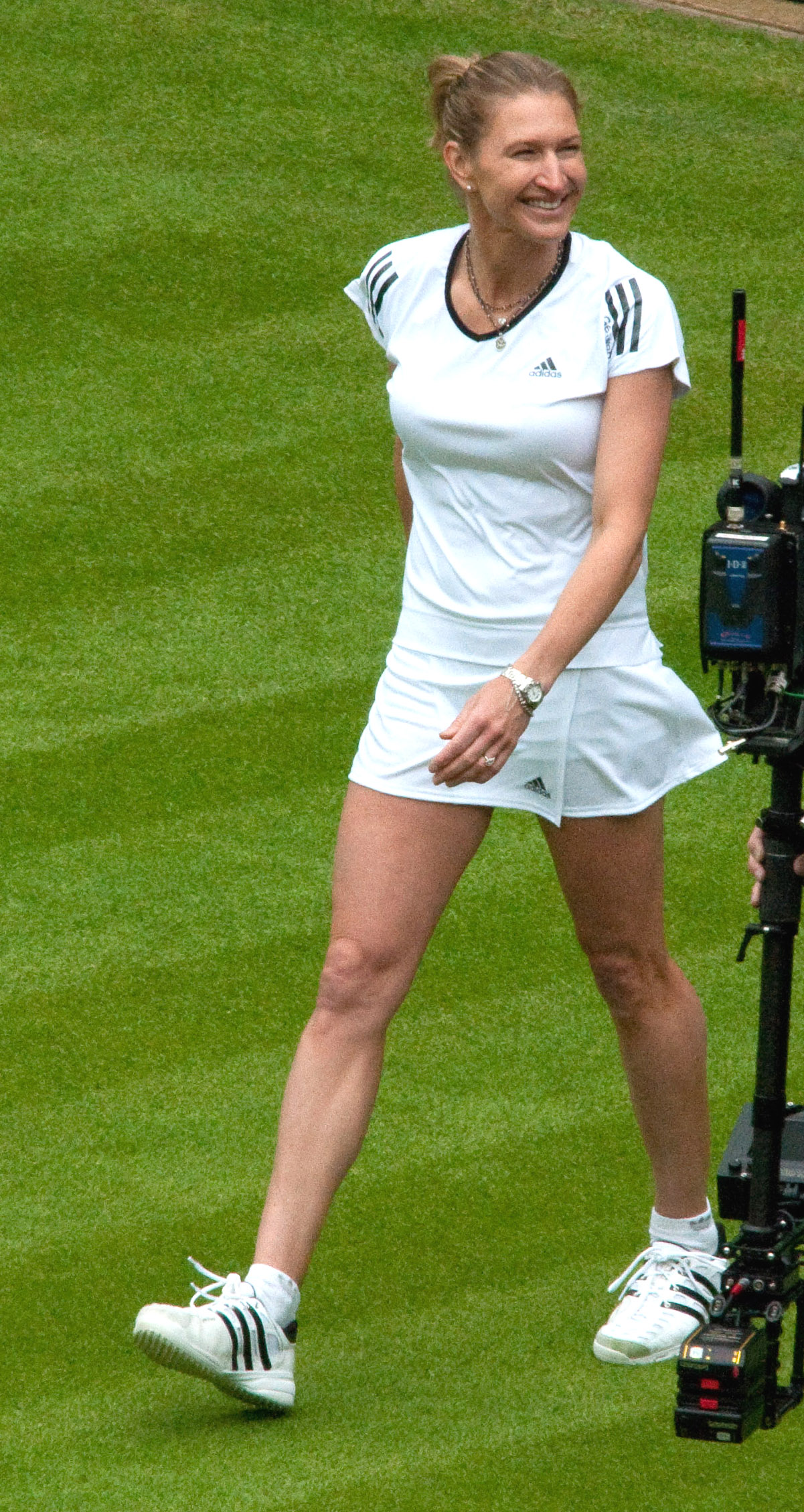
- Steffi Graf finished the year as world No. 1 for the third time in her career. She won 14 tournaments during the season, including three majors at the Australian Open, the Wimbledon Championships, and the US Open, as well as the Virginia Slims Championships. She also finished runner-up at the fourth major, the French Open.

Details
- Duration: November 28, 1988 – November 20, 1989
- Edition: 17th
- Tournaments: 61
- Categories: Grand Slam (4); Virginia Slims Championships (1); Category 5 (11); Category 4 (9); Category 3 (7); Category 2 (20); Category 1 (9)

Achievements (singles)
- Most titles: (West Germany) Steffi Graf (14)
- Most finals: (West Germany) Steffi Graf (16)
- Prize money leader: (West Germany) Steffi Graf $1,562,905
- Points leader: (West Germany) Steffi Graf 300.10

Awards
- Player of the year: (West Germany) Steffi Graf
- Doubles team of the year: (Czechoslovakia) Helena Suková (Czechoslovakia) Jana Novotná
- Most improved player of the year: (Spain) Arantxa Sánchez Vicario
- Newcomer of the year: (Spain) Conchita Martínez
- Comeback player of the year: (United States) Kathy Rinaldi

The 1989 Virginia Slims World Championship Series was the elite tour for professional women's tennis organised by the Women's Tennis Association (WTA). The 1989 Virginia Slims World Championship Series included the four Grand Slam tournaments, the Virginia Slims Championships and the WTA Category 1-5 events. ITF World Circuit tournaments are not part of the WTA World Championship Series, although they award points for the WTA World Ranking.

== Schedule ==
The table below shows the 1989 WTA Tour schedule.

Key

Grand Slam tournaments
Year-end championships
Category 5 events
Category 4 events
Category 3 events
Category 2 and 1 events
Team events

=== November 1988 ===
Week	Tournament	Champions	Runners-up	Semifinalists	Quarterfinalists
28 Nov	Danone Southern Cross Classic; Adelaide, Australia; Category 2 $100,000 – hard -32S/16D/30Q	(Czechoslovakia) Jana Novotná; 7–5, 6–4	(Czechoslovakia) Jana Pospíšilová	(Sweden) Maria Strandlund (Czechoslovakia) Radka Zrubáková	(Australia) Dianne Balestrat (Sweden) Catarina Lindqvist (Australia) Rachel McQuillan (Denmark) Tine Scheuer-Larsen
28 Nov	Danone Southern Cross Classic; Adelaide, Australia; Category 2 $100,000 – hard -32S/16D/30Q	(West Germany) Sylvia Hanika (West Germany) Claudia Kohde-Kilsch; 7–5, 6–7, 6–4	(United States) Lori McNeil (Czechoslovakia) Jana Novotná	(Sweden) Maria Strandlund (Czechoslovakia) Radka Zrubáková	(Australia) Dianne Balestrat (Sweden) Catarina Lindqvist (Australia) Rachel McQuillan (Denmark) Tine Scheuer-Larsen

=== January ===
Week	Tournament	Champions	Runners-up	Semifinalists	Quarterfinalists
2 Jan	Danone Hardcourt Championships; Brisbane, Australia; Category 2 Hard – $150,000 – 64S/32D; Singles – Doubles	(Czechoslovakia) Helena Suková; 7–6^{(8–6)}, 7–6^{(8–6)}	(Netherlands) Brenda Schultz	(United States) Patty Fendick (Australia) Jenny Byrne	(France) Catherine Tanvier (Australia) Nicole Provis (Czechoslovakia) Jana Novotná (Australia) Anne Minter
2 Jan	Danone Hardcourt Championships; Brisbane, Australia; Category 2 Hard – $150,000 – 64S/32D; Singles – Doubles	(Czechoslovakia) Jana Novotná (Czechoslovakia) Helena Suková; 6–7^{(4–7)}, 6–1, 6–2	(United States) Patty Fendick (Canada) Jill Hetherington	(United States) Patty Fendick (Australia) Jenny Byrne	(France) Catherine Tanvier (Australia) Nicole Provis (Czechoslovakia) Jana Novotná (Australia) Anne Minter
9 Jan	New South Wales Holden Open; Sydney; Category 3 Hard – $200,000 – 56S/28D; Singles – Doubles	(United States) Martina Navratilova; 6–2, 6–4	(Sweden) Catarina Lindqvist	(Czechoslovakia) Hana Mandlíková (United States) Terry Phelps	(United States) Patty Fendick (Austria) Judith Wiesner (United States) Mary Joe Fernández (United States) Pam Shriver
9 Jan	New South Wales Holden Open; Sydney; Category 3 Hard – $200,000 – 56S/28D; Singles – Doubles	(United States) Martina Navratilova (United States) Pam Shriver; 6–3, 6–3	(Australia) Elizabeth Smylie (Australia) Wendy Turnbull	(Czechoslovakia) Hana Mandlíková (United States) Terry Phelps	(United States) Patty Fendick (Austria) Judith Wiesner (United States) Mary Joe Fernández (United States) Pam Shriver
16 Jan	Australian Open; Melbourne, Australia; Hard – $937,882 – 128S/64D/32X; Singles – Doubles – Mixed doubles	(West Germany) Steffi Graf; 6–4, 6-4	(Czechoslovakia) Helena Suková	(Argentina) Gabriela Sabatini (Australia) Belinda Cordwell	(West Germany) Claudia Kohde-Kilsch (United States) Martina Navratilova (United States) Zina Garrison (Sweden) Catarina Lindqvist
16 Jan	Australian Open; Melbourne, Australia; Hard – $937,882 – 128S/64D/32X; Singles – Doubles – Mixed doubles	(United States) Martina Navratilova (United States) Pam Shriver; 3–6, 6–3, 6–2	(United States) Patty Fendick (Canada) Jill Hetherington	(Argentina) Gabriela Sabatini (Australia) Belinda Cordwell	(West Germany) Claudia Kohde-Kilsch (United States) Martina Navratilova (United States) Zina Garrison (Sweden) Catarina Lindqvist
16 Jan	Australian Open; Melbourne, Australia; Hard – $937,882 – 128S/64D/32X; Singles – Doubles – Mixed doubles	(Czechoslovakia) Jana Novotná (United States) Jim Pugh; 6–3, 6–4	(United States) Zina Garrison (United States) Sherwood Stewart	(Argentina) Gabriela Sabatini (Australia) Belinda Cordwell	(West Germany) Claudia Kohde-Kilsch (United States) Martina Navratilova (United States) Zina Garrison (Sweden) Catarina Lindqvist
30 Jan	Nutri-Metics Open; Auckland, New Zealand; Category 1 Hard – $75,000 - 32S/16D; Singles – Doubles	(United States) Patty Fendick; 6–2, 6–0	(Australia) Belinda Cordwell	(United States) Donna Faber (United Kingdom) Jo Durie	(Sweden) Maria Lindström (Spain) Conchita Martínez (United States) Beverly Bowes (West Germany) Wiltrud Probst
30 Jan	Nutri-Metics Open; Auckland, New Zealand; Category 1 Hard – $75,000 - 32S/16D; Singles – Doubles	(United States) Patty Fendick (Canada) Jill Hetherington; 6–4, 6–4	(Australia) Elizabeth Smylie (Australia) Janine Thompson	(United States) Donna Faber (United Kingdom) Jo Durie	(Sweden) Maria Lindström (Spain) Conchita Martínez (United States) Beverly Bowes (West Germany) Wiltrud Probst
30 Jan	Toray Pan Pacific Open; Tokyo, Japan; Category 4 Carpet (i) – $250,000 – 32S/16D; Singles – Doubles	(United States) Martina Navratilova; 6–7^{(3–7)}, 6–3, 7–6^{(7–5)}	(United States) Lori McNeil	(United States) Mary Joe Fernández (United States) Zina Garrison	(Argentina) Gabriela Sabatini (West Germany) Claudia Kohde-Kilsch (United States) Molly Van Nostrand (United States) Chris Evert
30 Jan	Toray Pan Pacific Open; Tokyo, Japan; Category 4 Carpet (i) – $250,000 – 32S/16D; Singles – Doubles	(United States) Katrina Adams (United States) Zina Garrison; 6–3, 3–6, 7–6^{(7–5)}	(United States) Mary Joe Fernández (West Germany) Claudia Kohde-Kilsch	(United States) Mary Joe Fernández (United States) Zina Garrison	(Argentina) Gabriela Sabatini (West Germany) Claudia Kohde-Kilsch (United States) Molly Van Nostrand (United States) Chris Evert

=== February ===
Week	Tournament	Champions	Runners-up	Semifinalists	Quarterfinalists
6 Feb	Fernleaf Classic; Wellington, New Zealand; Category 1 Hard – $50,000 – 32S/16D/28Q; Singles – Doubles	(Spain) Conchita Martínez; 6–1, 6–2	(Australia) Jo-Anne Faull	(United States) Leigh-Anne Eldredge (Belgium) Sandra Wasserman	(Australia) Elizabeth Smylie (West Germany) Martina Pawlik (United States) Halle Cioffi (Australia) Belinda Cordwell
6 Feb	Fernleaf Classic; Wellington, New Zealand; Category 1 Hard – $50,000 – 32S/16D/28Q; Singles – Doubles	(Australia) Elizabeth Smylie (Australia) Janine Tremelling; 7–6^{(7–3)}, 6–1	(Australia) Tracey Morton (Austria) Heidi Sprung	(United States) Leigh-Anne Eldredge (Belgium) Sandra Wasserman	(Australia) Elizabeth Smylie (West Germany) Martina Pawlik (United States) Halle Cioffi (Australia) Belinda Cordwell
13 Feb	Virginia Slims of Washington; Washington, United States; Category 5 Hard (i) – $300,000 – 32S/16D/30Q; Singles – Doubles	(West Germany) Steffi Graf; 6–1, 7–5	(United States) Zina Garrison	(Soviet Union) Natasha Zvereva (Socialist Federal Republic of Yugoslavia) Monica Seles	(Canada) Helen Kelesi (Soviet Union) Leila Meskhi (Bulgaria) Manuela Maleeva-Fragnière (United States) Gigi Fernández
13 Feb	Virginia Slims of Washington; Washington, United States; Category 5 Hard (i) – $300,000 – 32S/16D/30Q; Singles – Doubles	(United States) Betsy Nagelsen (United States) Pam Shriver; 6–2, 6–3	(Soviet Union) Natasha Zvereva (Soviet Union) Larisa Savchenko	(Soviet Union) Natasha Zvereva (Socialist Federal Republic of Yugoslavia) Monica Seles	(Canada) Helen Kelesi (Soviet Union) Leila Meskhi (Bulgaria) Manuela Maleeva-Fragnière (United States) Gigi Fernández
20 Feb	Virginia Slims of California; Oakland, United States; Category 4 Hard (i) – $250,000 – 32S/16D; Singles – Doubles	(United States) Zina Garrison; 6–1, 6–1	(Soviet Union) Larisa Savchenko	(United States) Martina Navratilova (Soviet Union) Natasha Zvereva	(Australia) Jenny Byrne (United States) Patty Fendick (United States) Gigi Fernández (France) Nathalie Tauziat
20 Feb	Virginia Slims of California; Oakland, United States; Category 4 Hard (i) – $250,000 – 32S/16D; Singles – Doubles	(United States) Patty Fendick (Canada) Jill Hetherington; 7–5, 3–6, 6–2	(Soviet Union) Natasha Zvereva (Soviet Union) Larisa Savchenko	(United States) Martina Navratilova (Soviet Union) Natasha Zvereva	(Australia) Jenny Byrne (United States) Patty Fendick (United States) Gigi Fernández (France) Nathalie Tauziat
20 Feb	Virginia Slims of Kansas; Wichita, United States; Category 2 Hard (i) – $100,000 – 32S/16D/32Q; Singles – Doubles	(United States) Amy Frazier; 4–6, 6–4, 6–0	(United States) Barbara Potter	(United States) Susan Sloane (United States) Meredith McGrath	(Soviet Union) Leila Meskhi (United States) Louise Allen (Netherlands) Manon Bollegraf (Canada) Helen Kelesi
20 Feb	Virginia Slims of Kansas; Wichita, United States; Category 2 Hard (i) – $100,000 – 32S/16D/32Q; Singles – Doubles	(Netherlands) Manon Bollegraf (South Africa) Lise Gregory; 6–2, 7–6^{(7–5)}	(United States) Sandy Collins (Soviet Union) Leila Meskhi	(United States) Susan Sloane (United States) Meredith McGrath	(Soviet Union) Leila Meskhi (United States) Louise Allen (Netherlands) Manon Bollegraf (Canada) Helen Kelesi
27 Feb	U.S. Women's Hard Court Championships; San Antonio, United States; Category 3 Hard – $200,000 – 32S/16D; Singles – Doubles	(West Germany) Steffi Graf; 6–1, 6–4	(United States) Ann Henricksson	(Australia) Hana Mandlíková (United States) Katrina Adams	(United States) Terry Phelps (United States) Camille Benjamin (Italy) Linda Ferrando (United States) Patty Fendick
27 Feb	U.S. Women's Hard Court Championships; San Antonio, United States; Category 3 Hard – $200,000 – 32S/16D; Singles – Doubles	(United States) Katrina Adams (United States) Pam Shriver; 3–6, 6–1, 6–4	(United States) Patty Fendick (Canada) Jill Hetherington	(Australia) Hana Mandlíková (United States) Katrina Adams	(United States) Terry Phelps (United States) Camille Benjamin (Italy) Linda Ferrando (United States) Patty Fendick
27 Feb	Virginia Slims of Oklahoma; Oklahoma City, United States; Category 2 Hard (i) – $100,000 – 32S/16D/32Q; Singles – Doubles	(Netherlands) Manon Bollegraf; 6–4, 6–4	(Soviet Union) Leila Meskhi	(Japan) Etsuko Inoue (Italy) Raffaella Reggi	(United States) Betsy Nagelsen (United States) Amy Frazier (Canada) Carling Bassett-Seguso (West Germany) Claudia Porwik
27 Feb	Virginia Slims of Oklahoma; Oklahoma City, United States; Category 2 Hard (i) – $100,000 – 32S/16D/32Q; Singles – Doubles	(United States) Lori McNeil (United States) Betsy Nagelsen w/o	(United States) Elise Burgin (Australia) Elizabeth Smylie	(Japan) Etsuko Inoue (Italy) Raffaella Reggi	(United States) Betsy Nagelsen (United States) Amy Frazier (Canada) Carling Bassett-Seguso (West Germany) Claudia Porwik

=== March ===
Week	Tournament	Champions	Runners-up	Semifinalists	Quarterfinalists
6 Mar	Virginia Slims of Indian Wells; Palm Springs, United States; Category 4 Hard – $250,000 – 32S/16D/64Q; Singles – Doubles	(Bulgaria) Manuela Maleeva-Fragnière; 6–4, 6–1	(Australia) Jenny Byrne	(Australia) Hana Mandlíková (Czechoslovakia) Helena Suková	(France) Isabelle Demongeot (United States) Pam Shriver (Sweden) Catarina Lindqvist (Czechoslovakia) Jana Novotná
6 Mar	Virginia Slims of Indian Wells; Palm Springs, United States; Category 4 Hard – $250,000 – 32S/16D/64Q; Singles – Doubles	(Australia) Hana Mandlíková (United States) Pam Shriver; 6–3, 6–7^{(4–7)}, 6–3	(South Africa) Rosalyn Fairbank (United States) Gretchen Magers	(Australia) Hana Mandlíková (Czechoslovakia) Helena Suková	(France) Isabelle Demongeot (United States) Pam Shriver (Sweden) Catarina Lindqvist (Czechoslovakia) Jana Novotná
13 Mar	Virginia Slims of Florida; Boca Raton, United States; Category 5 Hard – $300,000 – 56S/28D/32Q; Singles – Doubles	(West Germany) Steffi Graf; 4–6, 6–2, 6–3	(United States) Chris Evert	(Czechoslovakia) Helena Suková (Czechoslovakia) Jana Novotná	(Canada) Helen Kelesi (United States) Halle Cioffi (United States) Mary Joe Fernández (United States) Terry Phelps
13 Mar	Virginia Slims of Florida; Boca Raton, United States; Category 5 Hard – $300,000 – 56S/28D/32Q; Singles – Doubles	(Czechoslovakia) Jana Novotná (Czechoslovakia) Helena Suková; 6–4, 6–2	(United Kingdom) Jo Durie (United States) Mary Joe Fernández	(Czechoslovakia) Helena Suková (Czechoslovakia) Jana Novotná	(Canada) Helen Kelesi (United States) Halle Cioffi (United States) Mary Joe Fernández (United States) Terry Phelps
20 Mar	Lipton International Players Championships; Key Biscayne, United States; Category 5 (Tier I); Hard – $750,000 – 128S/64D/16X/64Q; Singles – Doubles	(Argentina) Gabriela Sabatini; 6–1, 4–6, 6–2	(United States) Chris Evert	(Czechoslovakia) Helena Suková (United States) Zina Garrison	(France) Isabelle Demongeot (Italy) Raffaella Reggi (Czechoslovakia) Jana Novotná (Canada) Helen Kelesi
20 Mar	Lipton International Players Championships; Key Biscayne, United States; Category 5 (Tier I); Hard – $750,000 – 128S/64D/16X/64Q; Singles – Doubles	(Czechoslovakia) Jana Novotná (Czechoslovakia) Helena Suková; 7–6 ^{(7–5)}, 6–4	(United States) Gigi Fernández (United States) Lori McNeil	(Czechoslovakia) Helena Suková (United States) Zina Garrison	(France) Isabelle Demongeot (Italy) Raffaella Reggi (Czechoslovakia) Jana Novotná (Canada) Helen Kelesi

=== April ===
Week	Tournament	Champions	Runners-up	Semifinalists	Quarterfinalists
3 Apr	Family Circle Cup; Hilton Head Island, United States; Category 5 Clay – $300,000 – 64S/32D/32Q; Singles – Doubles	(West Germany) Steffi Graf; 6–1, 6–1	(Soviet Union) Natasha Zvereva	(Spain) Arantxa Sánchez Vicario (United States) Martina Navratilova	(Czechoslovakia) Radka Zrubáková (Italy) Linda Ferrando (Soviet Union) Leila Meskhi (Australia) Hana Mandlíková
3 Apr	Family Circle Cup; Hilton Head Island, United States; Category 5 Clay – $300,000 – 64S/32D/32Q; Singles – Doubles	(Australia) Hana Mandlíková (United States) Martina Navratilova; 6–4, 6–1	(United States) Mary Lou Daniels (United States) Wendy White	(Spain) Arantxa Sánchez Vicario (United States) Martina Navratilova	(Czechoslovakia) Radka Zrubáková (Italy) Linda Ferrando (Soviet Union) Leila Meskhi (Australia) Hana Mandlíková
10 Apr	Bausch & Lomb Championships; Amelia Island, United States; Category 5 Clay – $300,000 – 64S/32D/32Q; Singles – Doubles	(Argentina) Gabriela Sabatini; 3–6, 6–3, 7–5	(West Germany) Steffi Graf	(Spain) Arantxa Sánchez Vicario (United States) Martina Navratilova	(Australia) Hana Mandlíková (Austria) Judith Wiesner (Greece) Angeliki Kanellopoulou (United States) Kathy Rinaldi
10 Apr	Bausch & Lomb Championships; Amelia Island, United States; Category 5 Clay – $300,000 – 64S/32D/32Q; Singles – Doubles	(Soviet Union) Larisa Savchenko (Soviet Union) Natasha Zvereva; 7–6^{(7–4)}, 2–6, 6–1	(United States) Martina Navratilova (United States) Pam Shriver	(Spain) Arantxa Sánchez Vicario (United States) Martina Navratilova	(Australia) Hana Mandlíková (Austria) Judith Wiesner (Greece) Angeliki Kanellopoulou (United States) Kathy Rinaldi
10 Apr	DHL Open; Singapore; Category 1 Hard – $75,000 – 32S/16D/32Q; Singles – Doubles	(Australia) Belinda Cordwell; 6–1, 6–0	(Japan) Akiko Kijimuta	(United Kingdom) Monique Javer (Belgium) Sandra Wasserman	(Poland) Iwona Kuczyńska (Switzerland) Eva Krapl (Belgium) Ann Devries (United States) Louise Allen
10 Apr	DHL Open; Singapore; Category 1 Hard – $75,000 – 32S/16D/32Q; Singles – Doubles	(Australia) Belinda Cordwell (Australia) Elizabeth Smylie; 6–7^{(6–8)}, 6–2, 6–1	(United States) Ann Henricksson (United States) Beth Herr	(United Kingdom) Monique Javer (Belgium) Sandra Wasserman	(Poland) Iwona Kuczyńska (Switzerland) Eva Krapl (Belgium) Ann Devries (United States) Louise Allen
17 Apr	Eckerd Open; Tampa, United States; Category 3 Clay – $200,000 – 32S/16D/32Q; Singles – Doubles	(Spain) Conchita Martínez; 6–3, 6–2	(Argentina) Gabriela Sabatini	(Spain) Arantxa Sánchez Vicario (Italy) Sandra Cecchini	(Italy) Linda Ferrando (South Africa) Rosalyn Fairbank (United States) Halle Cioffi (Czechoslovakia) Petra Langrová
17 Apr	Eckerd Open; Tampa, United States; Category 3 Clay – $200,000 – 32S/16D/32Q; Singles – Doubles	(Netherlands) Brenda Schultz (Hungary) Andrea Temesvári; 7–6^{(8–6)}, 6–4	(United States) Elise Burgin (South Africa) Rosalyn Fairbank	(Spain) Arantxa Sánchez Vicario (Italy) Sandra Cecchini	(Italy) Linda Ferrando (South Africa) Rosalyn Fairbank (United States) Halle Cioffi (Czechoslovakia) Petra Langrová
17 Apr	Suntory Japan Open Tennis Championships; Tokyo, Japan; Category 2 Hard – $100,000 – 32S/16D; Singles – Doubles	(Japan) Kumiko Okamoto; 6–4, 6–2	(Australia) Elizabeth Smylie	(Australia) Anne Minter (Australia) Belinda Cordwell	(United States) Betsy Nagelsen (Belgium) Sandra Wasserman (Japan) Kimiko Date (Japan) Etsuko Inoue
17 Apr	Suntory Japan Open Tennis Championships; Tokyo, Japan; Category 2 Hard – $100,000 – 32S/16D; Singles – Doubles	(Canada) Jill Hetherington (Australia) Elizabeth Smylie; 6–1, 6–3	(United States) Ann Henricksson (United States) Beth Herr	(Australia) Anne Minter (Australia) Belinda Cordwell	(United States) Betsy Nagelsen (Belgium) Sandra Wasserman (Japan) Kimiko Date (Japan) Etsuko Inoue
24 Apr	Spanish Open; Barcelona, Spain; Category 2 Clay – $100,000 – 32S/16D/32Q; Singles – Doubles	(Spain) Arantxa Sánchez Vicario; 6–2, 5–7, 6–1	(Canada) Helen Kelesi	(Czechoslovakia) Jana Novotná (Czechoslovakia) Eva Švíglerová	(Italy) Raffaella Reggi (Denmark) Tine Scheuer-Larsen (West Germany) Sylvia Hanika (Italy) Barbara Romanò
24 Apr	Spanish Open; Barcelona, Spain; Category 2 Clay – $100,000 – 32S/16D/32Q; Singles – Doubles	(Czechoslovakia) Jana Novotná (Denmark) Tine Scheuer-Larsen; 6–2, 2–6, 7–6^{(7–3)}	(Spain) Arantxa Sánchez Vicario (Austria) Judith Wiesner	(Czechoslovakia) Jana Novotná (Czechoslovakia) Eva Švíglerová	(Italy) Raffaella Reggi (Denmark) Tine Scheuer-Larsen (West Germany) Sylvia Hanika (Italy) Barbara Romanò
24 Apr	Taiwan Open; Taipei, Taiwan; Category 1 Clay – $50,000 – 32S/16D/32Q; Singles – Doubles	(Australia) Anne Minter; 6–1, 4–6, 6–2	(United States) Cammy MacGregor	(Switzerland) Eva Krapl (United States) Heather Ludloff	(United States) Beth Herr (Australia) Elizabeth Smylie (United States) Betsy Nagelsen (Belgium) Sabine Appelmans
24 Apr	Taiwan Open; Taipei, Taiwan; Category 1 Clay – $50,000 – 32S/16D/32Q; Singles – Doubles	(Sweden) Maria Lindström (United States) Heather Ludloff; 4–6, 7–5, 6–3	(Sweden) Cecilia Dahlman (Japan) Nana Miyagi	(Switzerland) Eva Krapl (United States) Heather Ludloff	(United States) Beth Herr (Australia) Elizabeth Smylie (United States) Betsy Nagelsen (Belgium) Sabine Appelmans
24 Apr	Virginia Slims of Houston; Houston, United States; Category 4 Clay – $250,000 – 32S/16D/32Q; Singles – Doubles	(Socialist Federal Republic of Yugoslavia) Monica Seles; 3–6, 6–1, 6–4	(United States) Chris Evert	(United States) Susan Sloane (United States) Carrie Cunningham	(United States) Gretchen Magers (United States) Lori McNeil (United States) Kim Kessaris (Hungary) Andrea Temesvári
24 Apr	Virginia Slims of Houston; Houston, United States; Category 4 Clay – $250,000 – 32S/16D/32Q; Singles – Doubles	(United States) Katrina Adams (United States) Zina Garrison; 6–3, 6–4	(United States) Gigi Fernández (United States) Lori McNeil	(United States) Susan Sloane (United States) Carrie Cunningham	(United States) Gretchen Magers (United States) Lori McNeil (United States) Kim Kessaris (Hungary) Andrea Temesvári

=== May ===
Week	Tournament	Champions	Runners-up	Semifinalists	Quarterfinalists
1 May	Citizen Cup; Hamburg, West Germany; Category 3 Clay – $200,000 – 56S/28D; Singles – Doubles	(West Germany) Steffi Graf w/o	(Czechoslovakia) Jana Novotná	(Argentina) Bettina Fulco (Spain) Arantxa Sánchez Vicario	(Australia) Rachel McQuillan (France) Nathalie Tauziat (Austria) Barbara Paulus (Czechoslovakia) Radka Zrubáková
1 May	Citizen Cup; Hamburg, West Germany; Category 3 Clay – $200,000 – 56S/28D; Singles – Doubles	(France) Isabelle Demongeot (France) Nathalie Tauziat w/o	(Czechoslovakia) Jana Novotná (Czechoslovakia) Helena Suková	(Argentina) Bettina Fulco (Spain) Arantxa Sánchez Vicario	(Australia) Rachel McQuillan (France) Nathalie Tauziat (Austria) Barbara Paulus (Czechoslovakia) Radka Zrubáková
1 May	Mantegazza Cup; Taranto, Italy; Category 1 Clay – $50,000 – 32S/16D/32Q; Singles – Doubles	(France) Karine Quentrec; 6–3, 5–7, 6–3	(Italy) Cathy Caverzasio	(Brazil) Neige Dias (Socialist Federal Republic of Yugoslavia) Sabrina Goleš	(Brazil) Luciana Corsato (Italy) Silvia Farina (Italy) Laura Golarsa (Argentina) Mercedes Paz
1 May	Mantegazza Cup; Taranto, Italy; Category 1 Clay – $50,000 – 32S/16D/32Q; Singles – Doubles	(Socialist Federal Republic of Yugoslavia) Sabrina Goleš (Argentina) Mercedes Paz; 6–2, 6–2	(France) Sophie Amiach (France) Emmanuelle Derly	(Brazil) Neige Dias (Socialist Federal Republic of Yugoslavia) Sabrina Goleš	(Brazil) Luciana Corsato (Italy) Silvia Farina (Italy) Laura Golarsa (Argentina) Mercedes Paz
8 May	Italian Open; Rome, Italy; Category 5 Clay – $300,000 – 64S/32D/32Q; Singles – Doubles	(Argentina) Gabriela Sabatini; 6–2, 5–7, 6–4	(Spain) Arantxa Sánchez Vicario	(Argentina) Bettina Fulco (France) Nathalie Tauziat	(Italy) Sandra Cecchini (Italy) Raffaella Reggi (Socialist Federal Republic of Yugoslavia) Sabrina Goleš (Austria) Judith Wiesner
8 May	Italian Open; Rome, Italy; Category 5 Clay – $300,000 – 64S/32D/32Q; Singles – Doubles	(Australia) Elizabeth Smylie (Australia) Janine Tremelling; 6–4, 6–3	(Netherlands) Manon Bollegraf (Argentina) Mercedes Paz	(Argentina) Bettina Fulco (France) Nathalie Tauziat	(Italy) Sandra Cecchini (Italy) Raffaella Reggi (Socialist Federal Republic of Yugoslavia) Sabrina Goleš (Austria) Judith Wiesner
15 May	Lufthansa Cup; West Berlin, West Germany; Category 5 (Tier I); Clay – $300,000 – 64S/32D/32Q; Singles – Doubles	(West Germany) Steffi Graf; 6–3, 6–1	(Argentina) Gabriela Sabatini	(Canada) Helen Kelesi (West Germany) Isabel Cueto	(Italy) Sandra Cecchini (Austria) Barbara Paulus (Czechoslovakia) Regina Rajchrtová (West Germany) Sylvia Hanika
15 May	Lufthansa Cup; West Berlin, West Germany; Category 5 (Tier I); Clay – $300,000 – 64S/32D/32Q; Singles – Doubles	(Australia) Elizabeth Smylie (Australia) Janine Tremelling; 5–7, 6–3, 6–2	(South Africa) Lise Gregory (United States) Gretchen Magers	(Canada) Helen Kelesi (West Germany) Isabel Cueto	(Italy) Sandra Cecchini (Austria) Barbara Paulus (Czechoslovakia) Regina Rajchrtová (West Germany) Sylvia Hanika
22 May	European Open; Geneva, Switzerland; Category 2 Clay – $100,000 – 32S/16D/32Q; Singles – Doubles	(Bulgaria) Manuela Maleeva-Fragnière; 6–4, 6–0	(Spain) Conchita Martínez	(Austria) Barbara Paulus (Italy) Laura Garrone	(Soviet Union) Larisa Savchenko (New Zealand) Belinda Cordwell (United States) Elise Burgin (Italy) Laura Lapi
22 May	European Open; Geneva, Switzerland; Category 2 Clay – $100,000 – 32S/16D/32Q; Singles – Doubles	(United States) Katrina Adams (United States) Lori McNeil; 2–6, 6–3, 6–4	(Soviet Union) Larisa Savchenko (Soviet Union) Natasha Zvereva	(Austria) Barbara Paulus (Italy) Laura Garrone	(Soviet Union) Larisa Savchenko (New Zealand) Belinda Cordwell (United States) Elise Burgin (Italy) Laura Lapi
22 May	Internationaux de Strasbourg; Strasbourg, France; Category 2 Clay – $100,000 – 32S/16D/32Q; Singles – Doubles	(Czechoslovakia) Jana Novotná; 6–1, 6–2	(Argentina) Patricia Tarabini	(West Germany) Wiltrud Probst (Australia) Jo-Anne Faull	(United States) Ann Grossman (Argentina) Bettina Fulco (United States) Susan Sloane (United States) Gretchen Magers
22 May	Internationaux de Strasbourg; Strasbourg, France; Category 2 Clay – $100,000 – 32S/16D/32Q; Singles – Doubles	(Argentina) Mercedes Paz (Austria) Judith Wiesner; 6–3, 6–3	(South Africa) Lise Gregory (United States) Gretchen Magers	(West Germany) Wiltrud Probst (Australia) Jo-Anne Faull	(United States) Ann Grossman (Argentina) Bettina Fulco (United States) Susan Sloane (United States) Gretchen Magers
29 May	French Open; Paris, France; Clay – $1,945,400 – 128S/64D/56X/64Q; Singles – Doubles – Mixed doubles	(Spain) Arantxa Sánchez Vicario; 7–6^{(8–6)}, 3–6, 7–5	(West Germany) Steffi Graf	(Socialist Federal Republic of Yugoslavia) Monica Seles (United States) Mary Joe Fernández	(Spain) Conchita Martínez (Bulgaria) Manuela Maleeva-Fragnière (Czechoslovakia) Jana Novotná (Canada) Helen Kelesi
29 May	French Open; Paris, France; Clay – $1,945,400 – 128S/64D/56X/64Q; Singles – Doubles – Mixed doubles	(Soviet Union) Larisa Neiland (Soviet Union) Natasha Zvereva; 6–4, 6–4	(West Germany) Steffi Graf (Argentina) Gabriela Sabatini	(Socialist Federal Republic of Yugoslavia) Monica Seles (United States) Mary Joe Fernández	(Spain) Conchita Martínez (Bulgaria) Manuela Maleeva-Fragnière (Czechoslovakia) Jana Novotná (Canada) Helen Kelesi
29 May	French Open; Paris, France; Clay – $1,945,400 – 128S/64D/56X/64Q; Singles – Doubles – Mixed doubles	(Netherlands) Manon Bollegraf (Netherlands) Tom Nijssen; 6–3, 6–7, 6–2	(Argentina) Horacio de la Peña (Spain) Arantxa Sánchez Vicario	(Socialist Federal Republic of Yugoslavia) Monica Seles (United States) Mary Joe Fernández	(Spain) Conchita Martínez (Bulgaria) Manuela Maleeva-Fragnière (Czechoslovakia) Jana Novotná (Canada) Helen Kelesi

=== June ===
Week	Tournament	Champions	Runners-up	Semifinalists	Quarterfinalists
12 Jun	Dow Classic; Birmingham, Great Britain; Category 2 Grass – $150,000 – 64S/32D/32Q; Singles – Doubles	(United States) Martina Navratilova; 7–6^{(7–5)}, 6–3	(United States) Zina Garrison	(South Africa) Elna Reinach (West Germany) Claudia Kohde-Kilsch	(Australia) Kristine Radford (United States) Betsy Nagelsen (United States) Ann Henricksson (Japan) Kimiko Date
12 Jun	Dow Classic; Birmingham, Great Britain; Category 2 Grass – $150,000 – 64S/32D/32Q; Singles – Doubles	(Soviet Union) Larisa Savchenko (Soviet Union) Natasha Zvereva; 7–5, 5–7, 6–0	(United States) Meredith McGrath (United States) Pam Shriver	(South Africa) Elna Reinach (West Germany) Claudia Kohde-Kilsch	(Australia) Kristine Radford (United States) Betsy Nagelsen (United States) Ann Henricksson (Japan) Kimiko Date
19 Jun	Pilkington Glass Championships; Eastbourne, Great Britain; Category 5 Grass – $300,000 – 64S/32D/32Q; Singles – Doubles	(United States) Martina Navratilova; 7–6^{(7–2)}, 6–2	(Italy) Raffaella Reggi	(South Africa) Rosalyn Fairbank (United States) Gigi Fernández	(United States) Mary Joe Fernández (United States) Betsy Nagelsen (Japan) Etsuko Inoue (Japan) Akiko Kijimuta
19 Jun	Pilkington Glass Championships; Eastbourne, Great Britain; Category 5 Grass – $300,000 – 64S/32D/32Q; Singles – Doubles	(United States) Katrina Adams (United States) Zina Garrison; 6–3, retired	(Czechoslovakia) Jana Novotná (Czechoslovakia) Helena Suková	(South Africa) Rosalyn Fairbank (United States) Gigi Fernández	(United States) Mary Joe Fernández (United States) Betsy Nagelsen (Japan) Etsuko Inoue (Japan) Akiko Kijimuta
26 Jun	The Championships, Wimbledon; London, Great Britain; Grass – $2,204,162 – 128S/64D/64Q/64X; Singles – Doubles – Mixed doubles	(West Germany) Steffi Graf; 6–2, 6–7^{(1–7)}, 6–1	(United States) Martina Navratilova	(United States) Chris Evert (Sweden) Catarina Lindqvist	(Spain) Arantxa Sánchez Vicario (Italy) Laura Golarsa (South Africa) Rosalyn Fairbank (United States) Gretchen Magers
26 Jun	The Championships, Wimbledon; London, Great Britain; Grass – $2,204,162 – 128S/64D/64Q/64X; Singles – Doubles – Mixed doubles	(Czechoslovakia) Jana Novotná (Czechoslovakia) Helena Suková; 6–1, 6–2	(Soviet Union) Larisa Savchenko (Soviet Union) Natasha Zvereva	(United States) Chris Evert (Sweden) Catarina Lindqvist	(Spain) Arantxa Sánchez Vicario (Italy) Laura Golarsa (South Africa) Rosalyn Fairbank (United States) Gretchen Magers
26 Jun	The Championships, Wimbledon; London, Great Britain; Grass – $2,204,162 – 128S/64D/64Q/64X; Singles – Doubles – Mixed doubles	(Czechoslovakia) Jana Novotná (United States) Jim Pugh; 6–4, 5–7, 6–4	(Australia) Jenny Byrne (Australia) Mark Kratzmann	(United States) Chris Evert (Sweden) Catarina Lindqvist	(Spain) Arantxa Sánchez Vicario (Italy) Laura Golarsa (South Africa) Rosalyn Fairbank (United States) Gretchen Magers

=== July ===
Week	Tournament	Champions	Runners-up	Semifinalists	Quarterfinalists
10 Jul	Arcachon Cup; Arcachon, France; Category 2 Clay – $100,000 – 32S/16D/32Q; Singles – Doubles	(Austria) Judith Wiesner; 6–3, 6–7^{(3–7)}, 6–1	(Austria) Barbara Paulus	(Netherlands) Nicole Jagerman (Argentina) Mercedes Paz	(Italy) Cathy Caverzasio (West Germany) Sabine Hack (West Germany) Isabel Cueto (Argentina) Florencia Labat
10 Jul	Arcachon Cup; Arcachon, France; Category 2 Clay – $100,000 – 32S/16D/32Q; Singles – Doubles	(Italy) Sandra Cecchini (Argentina) Patricia Tarabini; 6–3, 7–6^{(7–5)}	(Argentina) Mercedes Paz (Netherlands) Brenda Schultz	(Netherlands) Nicole Jagerman (Argentina) Mercedes Paz	(Italy) Cathy Caverzasio (West Germany) Sabine Hack (West Germany) Isabel Cueto (Argentina) Florencia Labat
17 Jul	Belgian Open; Brussels, Belgium; Category 2 Clay – $100,000 – 32S/16D/32Q; Singles – Doubles	(Czechoslovakia) Radka Zrubáková; 7–6^{(8–6)}, 6–4	(Argentina) Mercedes Paz	(Netherlands) Manon Bollegraf (Netherlands) Nicole Jagerman	(Czechoslovakia) Jana Novotná (Czechoslovakia) Leona Lásková (Belgium) Sandra Wasserman (Netherlands) Brenda Schultz
17 Jul	Belgian Open; Brussels, Belgium; Category 2 Clay – $100,000 – 32S/16D/32Q; Singles – Doubles	(Netherlands) Manon Bollegraf (Argentina) Mercedes Paz; 6–1, 6–2	(Netherlands) Carin Bakkum (Netherlands) Simone Schilder	(Netherlands) Manon Bollegraf (Netherlands) Nicole Jagerman	(Czechoslovakia) Jana Novotná (Czechoslovakia) Leona Lásková (Belgium) Sandra Wasserman (Netherlands) Brenda Schultz
17 Jul	Estoril Open; Oeiras, Portugal; Category 2 Clay – $100,000 – 32S/16D/32Q; Singles – Doubles	(West Germany) Isabel Cueto; 7–6^{(7–3)}, 6–2	(Italy) Sandra Cecchini	(Italy) Katia Piccolini (Argentina) Patricia Tarabini	(Italy) Laura Garrone (Czechoslovakia) Regina Rajchrtová (Brazil) Andrea Vieira (Austria) Barbara Paulus
17 Jul	Estoril Open; Oeiras, Portugal; Category 2 Clay – $100,000 – 32S/16D/32Q; Singles – Doubles	(Czechoslovakia) Iva Budařová (Czechoslovakia) Regina Rajchrtová; 6–2, 6–4	(Argentina) Gaby Castro (Spain) Conchita Martínez	(Italy) Katia Piccolini (Argentina) Patricia Tarabini	(Italy) Laura Garrone (Czechoslovakia) Regina Rajchrtová (Brazil) Andrea Vieira (Austria) Barbara Paulus
17 Jul	Virginia Slims of Newport; Newport, United States; Category 3 Grass – $200,000 – 32S/16D/32Q; Singles – Doubles	(United States) Zina Garrison; 6–0, 6–1	(United States) Pam Shriver	(United States) Gigi Fernández (South Africa) Rosalyn Fairbank	(Australia) Michelle Jaggard (Peru) Laura Gildemeister (United States) Hu Na (Canada) Jill Hetherington
17 Jul	Virginia Slims of Newport; Newport, United States; Category 3 Grass – $200,000 – 32S/16D/32Q; Singles – Doubles	(United States) Gigi Fernández (United States) Lori McNeil; 6–3, 6–7^{(5–7)}, 7–5	(Australia) Elizabeth Smylie (Australia) Wendy Turnbull	(United States) Gigi Fernández (South Africa) Rosalyn Fairbank	(Australia) Michelle Jaggard (Peru) Laura Gildemeister (United States) Hu Na (Canada) Jill Hetherington
24 Jul	OTB Open; Schenectady, United States; Category 1 Hard – $75,000 – 56S/28D; Singles – Doubles	(Peru) Laura Gildemeister; 6–4, 6–3	(United States) Marianne Werdel	(United States) Gretchen Magers (United States) Halle Cioffi	(United States) Ann Henricksson (Poland) Renata Baranski (United States) Stacey Martin (United States) Sandra Birch
24 Jul	OTB Open; Schenectady, United States; Category 1 Hard – $75,000 – 56S/28D; Singles – Doubles	(Australia) Michelle Jaggard (United States) Hu Na; 6–3, 6–2	(United States) Sandra Birch (United States) Debbie Graham	(United States) Gretchen Magers (United States) Halle Cioffi	(United States) Ann Henricksson (Poland) Renata Baranski (United States) Stacey Martin (United States) Sandra Birch
24 Jul	Volvo Open; Båstad, Sweden; Category 1 Clay – $75,000 – 64S/32D/32Q; Singles – Doubles	(Bulgaria) Katerina Maleeva; 6–1, 6–3	(West Germany) Sabine Hack	(Italy) Sandra Cecchini (Sweden) Maria Strandlund	(Italy) Cathy Caverzasio (Finland) Nanne Dalhman (West Germany) Isabel Cueto (Czechoslovakia) Radka Zrubáková
24 Jul	Volvo Open; Båstad, Sweden; Category 1 Clay – $75,000 – 64S/32D/32Q; Singles – Doubles	(Argentina) Mercedes Paz (Denmark) Tine Scheuer-Larsen; 6–2, 7–5	(Socialist Federal Republic of Yugoslavia) Sabrina Goleš (Bulgaria) Katerina Maleeva	(Italy) Sandra Cecchini (Sweden) Maria Strandlund	(Italy) Cathy Caverzasio (Finland) Nanne Dalhman (West Germany) Isabel Cueto (Czechoslovakia) Radka Zrubáková
31 Jul	Vitosha New Otani Open; Sofia, Bulgaria; Category 1 Clay – $50,000 – 32S/16D/32Q; Singles – Doubles	(West Germany) Isabel Cueto; 6–2, 7–6^{(7–3)}	(Bulgaria) Katerina Maleeva	(Italy) Barbara Romanò (Greece) Angeliki Kanellopoulou	(West Germany) Silke Meier (Czechoslovakia) Petra Langrová (Sweden) Cecilia Dahlman (Socialist Federal Republic of Yugoslavia) Sabrina Goleš
31 Jul	Vitosha New Otani Open; Sofia, Bulgaria; Category 1 Clay – $50,000 – 32S/16D/32Q; Singles – Doubles	(Italy) Laura Garrone (Italy) Laura Golarsa; 6–4, 7–5	(West Germany) Silke Meier (Bulgaria) Elena Pampoulova	(Italy) Barbara Romanò (Greece) Angeliki Kanellopoulou	(West Germany) Silke Meier (Czechoslovakia) Petra Langrová (Sweden) Cecilia Dahlman (Socialist Federal Republic of Yugoslavia) Sabrina Goleš
31 Jul	Great American Bank Classic; San Diego, United States; Category 3 Hard – $200,000 – 32S/16D/32Q; Singles – Doubles	(West Germany) Steffi Graf; 6–4, 7–5	(United States) Zina Garrison	(West Germany) Bettina Bunge (France) Nathalie Tauziat	(West Germany) Claudia Kohde-Kilsch (United States) Ann Grossman (United States) Robin White (United States) Gretchen Magers
31 Jul	Great American Bank Classic; San Diego, United States; Category 3 Hard – $200,000 – 32S/16D/32Q; Singles – Doubles	(United States) Elise Burgin (South Africa) Rosalyn Fairbank; 4–6, 6–3, 6–3	(United States) Gretchen Magers (United States) Robin White	(West Germany) Bettina Bunge (France) Nathalie Tauziat	(West Germany) Claudia Kohde-Kilsch (United States) Ann Grossman (United States) Robin White (United States) Gretchen Magers

=== August ===
Week	Tournament	Champions	Runners-up	Semifinalists	Quarterfinalists
7 Aug	Virginia Slims of Los Angeles; Manhattan Beach, United States; Category 5 Hard – $300,000 – 64S/32D/32Q; Singles – Doubles	(United States) Martina Navratilova; 6–0, 6–2	(Argentina) Gabriela Sabatini	(United States) Zina Garrison (United States) Pam Shriver	(Australia) Hana Mandlíková (France) Nathalie Tauziat (United States) Mary Joe Fernández (Sweden) Catarina Lindqvist
7 Aug	Virginia Slims of Los Angeles; Manhattan Beach, United States; Category 5 Hard – $300,000 – 64S/32D/32Q; Singles – Doubles	(United States) Martina Navratilova (Australia) Wendy Turnbull; 5–2, retired	(United States) Mary Joe Fernández (West Germany) Claudia Kohde-Kilsch	(United States) Zina Garrison (United States) Pam Shriver	(Australia) Hana Mandlíková (France) Nathalie Tauziat (United States) Mary Joe Fernández (Sweden) Catarina Lindqvist
14 Aug	United Jersey Bank Classic; Mahwah, United States; Category 3 Hard – $200,000 – 32S/16D/32Q; Singles – Doubles	(West Germany) Steffi Graf; 7–5, 6–2	(Hungary) Andrea Temesvári	(Italy) Linda Ferrando (United States) Stacey Martin	(Australia) Hana Mandlíková (Peru) Laura Gildemeister (France) Pascale Paradis (West Germany) Sylvia Hanika
14 Aug	United Jersey Bank Classic; Mahwah, United States; Category 3 Hard – $200,000 – 32S/16D/32Q; Singles – Doubles	(West Germany) Steffi Graf (United States) Pam Shriver; 6–2, 6–4	(United States) Louise Allen (Peru) Laura Gildemeister	(Italy) Linda Ferrando (United States) Stacey Martin	(Australia) Hana Mandlíková (Peru) Laura Gildemeister (France) Pascale Paradis (West Germany) Sylvia Hanika
14 Aug	Virginia Slims of Albuquerque; Albuquerque, United States; Category 2 Hard – $100,000 – 32S/16D/32Q; Singles – Doubles	(United States) Lori McNeil; 6–1, 6–3	(South Africa) Elna Reinach	(United States) Betsy Nagelsen (United States) Amy Frazier	(United States) Anne Smith (United States) Beverly Bowes (Australia) Anne Minter (Bulgaria) Manuela Maleeva-Fragnière
14 Aug	Virginia Slims of Albuquerque; Albuquerque, United States; Category 2 Hard – $100,000 – 32S/16D/32Q; Singles – Doubles	(Australia) Nicole Provis (South Africa) Elna Reinach; 4–6, 6–4, 6–2	(Italy) Raffaella Reggi (Spain) Arantxa Sánchez Vicario	(United States) Betsy Nagelsen (United States) Amy Frazier	(United States) Anne Smith (United States) Beverly Bowes (Australia) Anne Minter (Bulgaria) Manuela Maleeva-Fragnière
21 Aug	Player's Canadian Open; Toronto, Canada; Category 5 Hard – $300,000 – 64S/32D/32Q; Singles – Doubles	(United States) Martina Navratilova; 6–2, 6–2	(Spain) Arantxa Sánchez Vicario	(Australia) Anne Minter (Argentina) Gabriela Sabatini	(Japan) Nana Miyagi (West Germany) Sylvia Hanika (France) Nathalie Tauziat (Czechoslovakia) Jana Novotná
21 Aug	Player's Canadian Open; Toronto, Canada; Category 5 Hard – $300,000 – 64S/32D/32Q; Singles – Doubles	(United States) Gigi Fernández (United States) Robin White; 6–1, 7–5	(United States) Martina Navratilova (Soviet Union) Larisa Savchenko	(Australia) Anne Minter (Argentina) Gabriela Sabatini	(Japan) Nana Miyagi (West Germany) Sylvia Hanika (France) Nathalie Tauziat (Czechoslovakia) Jana Novotná
28 Aug	US Open; New York City, United States; Hard – $2,000,000 – 128S/64D/64Q/32X; Singles – Doubles – Mixed doubles	(West Germany) Steffi Graf; 3–6, 7–5, 6–1	(United States) Martina Navratilova	(Argentina) Gabriela Sabatini (United States) Zina Garrison	(Czechoslovakia) Helena Suková (Spain) Arantxa Sánchez Vicario (United States) Chris Evert (Bulgaria) Manuela Maleeva-Fragnière
28 Aug	US Open; New York City, United States; Hard – $2,000,000 – 128S/64D/64Q/32X; Singles – Doubles – Mixed doubles	(Australia) Hana Mandlíková (United States) Martina Navratilova; 5–7, 6–4, 6–4	(United States) Mary Joe Fernández (United States) Pam Shriver	(Argentina) Gabriela Sabatini (United States) Zina Garrison	(Czechoslovakia) Helena Suková (Spain) Arantxa Sánchez Vicario (United States) Chris Evert (Bulgaria) Manuela Maleeva-Fragnière
28 Aug	US Open; New York City, United States; Hard – $2,000,000 – 128S/64D/64Q/32X; Singles – Doubles – Mixed doubles	(United States) Robin White (United States) Shelby Cannon; 3–6, 6–2, 7–5	(United States) Meredith McGrath (United States) Rick Leach	(Argentina) Gabriela Sabatini (United States) Zina Garrison	(Czechoslovakia) Helena Suková (Spain) Arantxa Sánchez Vicario (United States) Chris Evert (Bulgaria) Manuela Maleeva-Fragnière

=== September ===
Week	Tournament	Champions	Runners-up	Semifinalists	Quarterfinalists
11 Sep	Athens Trophy; Athens, Greece; Category 1 Clay – $75,000 – 32S/16D/32Q; Singles – Doubles	(Sweden) Cecilia Dahlman; 6–3, 1–6, 7–5	(Australia) Rachel McQuillan	(Italy) Laura Garrone (Italy) Francesca Romano	(Italy) Barbara Romanò (Czechoslovakia) Iva Budařová (Greece) Angeliki Kanellopoulou (Italy) Sandra Cecchini
11 Sep	Athens Trophy; Athens, Greece; Category 1 Clay – $75,000 – 32S/16D/32Q; Singles – Doubles	(Italy) Sandra Cecchini (Argentina) Patricia Tarabini; 4–6, 6–4, 6–2	(West Germany) Silke Meier (Bulgaria) Elena Pampoulova	(Italy) Laura Garrone (Italy) Francesca Romano	(Italy) Barbara Romanò (Czechoslovakia) Iva Budařová (Greece) Angeliki Kanellopoulou (Italy) Sandra Cecchini
11 Sep	Virginia Slims of Arizona; Phoenix, United States; Category 2 Hard – $100,000 – 32S/16D/32Q	(Spain) Conchita Martínez; 3–6, 6–4, 6–2	(United States) Elise Burgin	(South Africa) Amanda Coetzer (Australia) Nicole Provis	(United States) Shaun Stafford (United States) Beverly Bowes (Argentina) Florencia Labat (Bulgaria) Katerina Maleeva
11 Sep	Virginia Slims of Arizona; Phoenix, United States; Category 2 Hard – $100,000 – 32S/16D/32Q	(United States) Penny Barg (United States) Peanut Louie Harper; 7–6^{(16–14)}, 7–6^{(7–3)}	(United States) Elise Burgin (South Africa) Rosalyn Fairbank	(South Africa) Amanda Coetzer (Australia) Nicole Provis	(United States) Shaun Stafford (United States) Beverly Bowes (Argentina) Florencia Labat (Bulgaria) Katerina Maleeva
11 Sep	Virginia Slims Int. Doubles Championships; Tokyo, Japan; WTA Championships; Carpet (i) – $175,000 – 8D	(United States) Gigi Fernández (United States) Robin White; 6–2, 6–2	(Australia) Elizabeth Smylie (Australia) Wendy Turnbull		
18 Sep	Clarins Open; Paris, France; Category 2 Clay – $100,000 – 32S/16D/32Q; Singles – Doubles	(Italy) Sandra Cecchini; 6–4, 6–7^{(5–7)}, 6–1	(Czechoslovakia) Regina Rajchrtová	(Italy) Cathy Caverzasio (Czechoslovakia) Petra Langrová	(France) Nathalie Tauziat (Czechoslovakia) Radka Zrubáková (Bulgaria) Elena Pampoulova (West Germany) Isabel Cueto
18 Sep	Clarins Open; Paris, France; Category 2 Clay – $100,000 – 32S/16D/32Q; Singles – Doubles	(Italy) Sandra Cecchini (Argentina) Patricia Tarabini; 6–1, 6–1	(France) Nathalie Herreman (France) Catherine Suire	(Italy) Cathy Caverzasio (Czechoslovakia) Petra Langrová	(France) Nathalie Tauziat (Czechoslovakia) Radka Zrubáková (Bulgaria) Elena Pampoulova (West Germany) Isabel Cueto
18 Sep	Virginia Slims of Dallas; Dallas, United States; Category 4 Hard (i) – $250,000 – 28S/16D/32Q	(United States) Martina Navratilova; 7–6^{(7–2)}, 6–3	(Socialist Federal Republic of Yugoslavia) Monica Seles	(Bulgaria) Manuela Maleeva-Fragnière (United States) Anne Smith	(United States) Mary Joe Fernández (Italy) Raffaella Reggi (South Africa) Rosalyn Fairbank (Spain) Arantxa Sánchez Vicario
18 Sep	Virginia Slims of Dallas; Dallas, United States; Category 4 Hard (i) – $250,000 – 28S/16D/32Q	(United States) Mary Joe Fernández (United States) Betsy Nagelsen; 7–6^{(7–5)}, 6–3	(United States) Elise Burgin (South Africa) Rosalyn Fairbank	(Bulgaria) Manuela Maleeva-Fragnière (United States) Anne Smith	(United States) Mary Joe Fernández (Italy) Raffaella Reggi (South Africa) Rosalyn Fairbank (Spain) Arantxa Sánchez Vicario

=== October ===
Week	Tournament	Champions	Runners-up	Semifinalists	Quarterfinalists
2 Oct	Fed Cup; Tokyo, Japan, Hard; Team Event $0 – clay – 32 Teams	United States; 3–0	Spain	Czechoslovakia; Australia	West Germany; Austria; Bulgaria; Soviet Union
9 Oct	Virginia Slims of Moscow; Moscow, Soviet Union; Category 2 Hard – $100,000 – 32S/16D/32Q; Singles – Doubles	(United States) Gretchen Magers; 6–3, 6–4	(Soviet Union) Natasha Zvereva	(Soviet Union) Larisa Savchenko (Soviet Union) Natalia Medvedeva	(France) Julie Halard (Italy) Laura Golarsa (West Germany) Sabine Hack (Sweden) Maria Strandlund
9 Oct	Virginia Slims of Moscow; Moscow, Soviet Union; Category 2 Hard – $100,000 – 32S/16D/32Q; Singles – Doubles	(Soviet Union) Larisa Savchenko (Soviet Union) Natasha Zvereva; 6–3, 6–4	(France) Nathalie Herreman (France) Catherine Suire	(Soviet Union) Larisa Savchenko (Soviet Union) Natalia Medvedeva	(France) Julie Halard (Italy) Laura Golarsa (West Germany) Sabine Hack (Sweden) Maria Strandlund
9 Oct	Porsche Tennis Grand Prix; Filderstadt, West Germany; Category 4 Carpet (i) – $250,000 – 32S/16D/32Q; Singles – Doubles	(Argentina) Gabriela Sabatini; 7–6^{(7–5)}, 6–4	(United States) Mary Joe Fernández	(Peru) Laura Gildemeister (United States) Zina Garrison	(Australia) Hana Mandlíková (Czechoslovakia) Radka Zrubáková (Socialist Federal Republic of Yugoslavia) Monica Seles (United States) Gigi Fernández
9 Oct	Porsche Tennis Grand Prix; Filderstadt, West Germany; Category 4 Carpet (i) – $250,000 – 32S/16D/32Q; Singles – Doubles	(United States) Gigi Fernández (United States) Robin White; 6–4, 7–6^{(6–2)}	(Italy) Raffaella Reggi (South Africa) Elna Reinach	(Peru) Laura Gildemeister (United States) Zina Garrison	(Australia) Hana Mandlíková (Czechoslovakia) Radka Zrubáková (Socialist Federal Republic of Yugoslavia) Monica Seles (United States) Gigi Fernández
16 Oct	Open de la Côte Basque; Bayonne, France; Category 2 Hard (i) – $100,000 – 32S/16D/32Q	(Bulgaria) Katerina Maleeva; 6–2, 6–2	(Spain) Conchita Martínez	(Italy) Raffaella Reggi (United States) Kathy Rinaldi	(Austria) Barbara Paulus (West Germany) Wiltrud Probst (West Germany) Bettina Bunge (West Germany) Claudia Porwik
16 Oct	Open de la Côte Basque; Bayonne, France; Category 2 Hard (i) – $100,000 – 32S/16D/32Q	(Netherlands) Manon Bollegraf (France) Catherine Tanvier; 7–6^{(7–3)}, 7–5	(South Africa) Elna Reinach (Italy) Raffaella Reggi	(Italy) Raffaella Reggi (United States) Kathy Rinaldi	(Austria) Barbara Paulus (West Germany) Wiltrud Probst (West Germany) Bettina Bunge (West Germany) Claudia Porwik
16 Oct	BMW European Indoors; Zürich, Switzerland; Category 4 Carpet (i) – $250,000 – 32S/16D	(West Germany) Steffi Graf; 6–1, 7–6^{(8–6)}	(Czechoslovakia) Jana Novotná	(Czechoslovakia) Helena Suková (Socialist Federal Republic of Yugoslavia) Monica Seles	(France) Karine Quentrec (Australia) Hana Mandlíková (Canada) Helen Kelesi (France) Nathalie Tauziat
16 Oct	BMW European Indoors; Zürich, Switzerland; Category 4 Carpet (i) – $250,000 – 32S/16D	(Czechoslovakia) Jana Novotná (Czechoslovakia) Helena Suková; 6–3, 3–6, 6–4	(France) Nathalie Tauziat (Austria) Judith Wiesner	(Czechoslovakia) Helena Suková (Socialist Federal Republic of Yugoslavia) Monica Seles	(France) Karine Quentrec (Australia) Hana Mandlíková (Canada) Helen Kelesi (France) Nathalie Tauziat
23 Oct	Midland Group Championships; Brighton, Great Britain; Category 4 Hard (i) – $250,000 – 32S/16D/32Q	(West Germany) Steffi Graf; 7–5, 6–4	(Socialist Federal Republic of Yugoslavia) Monica Seles	(Czechoslovakia) Jana Novotná (Bulgaria) Manuela Maleeva-Fragnière	(South Africa) Elna Reinach (Italy) Raffaella Reggi (Czechoslovakia) Hana Mandlíková (Sweden) Catarina Lindqvist
23 Oct	Midland Group Championships; Brighton, Great Britain; Category 4 Hard (i) – $250,000 – 32S/16D/32Q	(United States) Katrina Adams (United States) Lori McNeil; 4–6, 7–6^{(9–7)}, 6–4	(Australia) Hana Mandlíková (Czechoslovakia) Jana Novotná	(Czechoslovakia) Jana Novotná (Bulgaria) Manuela Maleeva-Fragnière	(South Africa) Elna Reinach (Italy) Raffaella Reggi (Czechoslovakia) Hana Mandlíková (Sweden) Catarina Lindqvist
23 Oct	Puerto Rico Open; San Juan, Puerto Rico; Category 2 Hard (i) – $100,000 – 32S/16D/32Q; Singles – Doubles	(Peru) Laura Gildemeister; 6–1, 6–2	(United States) Gigi Fernández	(Soviet Union) Natasha Zvereva (Canada) Helen Kelesi	(United States) Donna Faber (United States) Camille Benjamin (Canada) Rene Simpson (Argentina) Patricia Tarabini
23 Oct	Puerto Rico Open; San Juan, Puerto Rico; Category 2 Hard (i) – $100,000 – 32S/16D/32Q; Singles – Doubles	(United States) Cammy MacGregor / (United States) Ronni Reis vs. (United States) Gigi Fernández / (United States) Robin White; Suspended due to rain		(Soviet Union) Natasha Zvereva (Canada) Helen Kelesi	(United States) Donna Faber (United States) Camille Benjamin (Canada) Rene Simpson (Argentina) Patricia Tarabini
30 Oct	Virginia Slims of Indianapolis; Indianapolis, United States; Category 2 Hard (i) – $100,000 – 32S/16D/32Q; Singles – Doubles	(Bulgaria) Katerina Maleeva; 6–4, 6–4	(Italy) Raffaella Reggi	(United States) Amy Frazier (United States) Ronni Reis	(Soviet Union) Natalia Medvedeva (United States) Halle Cioffi (Soviet Union) Larisa Savchenko (Czechoslovakia) Jana Pospíšilová
30 Oct	Virginia Slims of Indianapolis; Indianapolis, United States; Category 2 Hard (i) – $100,000 – 32S/16D/32Q; Singles – Doubles	(United States) Katrina Adams (United States) Lori McNeil; 6–4, 6–4	(West Germany) Claudia Porwik (Soviet Union) Larisa Savchenko	(United States) Amy Frazier (United States) Ronni Reis	(Soviet Union) Natalia Medvedeva (United States) Halle Cioffi (Soviet Union) Larisa Savchenko (Czechoslovakia) Jana Pospíšilová
30 Oct	Virginia Slims of New England; Worcester, United States; Category 5 Hard (i) – $300,000 – 32S/16D; Singles – Doubles	(United States) Martina Navratilova; 6–2, 6–3	(United States) Zina Garrison	(United States) Anne Smith (Argentina) Gabriela Sabatini	(United States) Pam Shriver (Spain) Conchita Martínez (Australia) Elizabeth Smylie (South Africa) Rosalyn Fairbank
30 Oct	Virginia Slims of New England; Worcester, United States; Category 5 Hard (i) – $300,000 – 32S/16D; Singles – Doubles	(United States) Martina Navratilova (United States) Pam Shriver; 4–6, 6–4, 6–4	(United States) Elise Burgin (South Africa) Rosalyn Fairbank	(United States) Anne Smith (Argentina) Gabriela Sabatini	(United States) Pam Shriver (Spain) Conchita Martínez (Australia) Elizabeth Smylie (South Africa) Rosalyn Fairbank

=== November ===
Week	Tournament	Champions	Runners-up	Semifinalists	Quarterfinalists
6 Nov	Virginia Slims of Chicago; Chicago, United States; Category 4 Hard (i) – $250,000 – 28S/16D; Singles – Doubles	(United States) Zina Garrison; 6–3, 2–6, 6–4	(Soviet Union) Larisa Savchenko	(Czechoslovakia) Helena Suková (Bulgaria) Manuela Maleeva-Fragnière	(United States) Martina Navratilova (United States) Ann Henricksson (United States) Gretchen Magers (United States) Pam Shriver
6 Nov	Virginia Slims of Chicago; Chicago, United States; Category 4 Hard (i) – $250,000 – 28S/16D; Singles – Doubles	(Soviet Union) Larisa Savchenko (Soviet Union) Natasha Zvereva; 6–3, 2–6, 6–3	(Czechoslovakia) Jana Novotná (Czechoslovakia) Helena Suková	(Czechoslovakia) Helena Suková (Bulgaria) Manuela Maleeva-Fragnière	(United States) Martina Navratilova (United States) Ann Henricksson (United States) Gretchen Magers (United States) Pam Shriver
6 Nov	Virginia Slims of Nashville; Nashville, United States; Category 2 Hard (i) – $100,000 – 32S/16D/32Q; Singles – Doubles	(Soviet Union) Leila Meskhi; 6–2, 6–3	(Canada) Helen Kelesi	(Netherlands) Manon Bollegraf (United States) Susan Sloane	(Bulgaria) Katerina Maleeva (Soviet Union) Natalia Medvedeva (United States) Wendy White (Czechoslovakia) Jana Pospíšilová
6 Nov	Virginia Slims of Nashville; Nashville, United States; Category 2 Hard (i) – $100,000 – 32S/16D/32Q; Singles – Doubles	(Netherlands) Manon Bollegraf (United States) Meredith McGrath; 1–6, 7–6^{(7–5)}, 7–6^{(7–4)}	(Soviet Union) Natalia Medvedeva (Soviet Union) Leila Meskhi	(Netherlands) Manon Bollegraf (United States) Susan Sloane	(Bulgaria) Katerina Maleeva (Soviet Union) Natalia Medvedeva (United States) Wendy White (Czechoslovakia) Jana Pospíšilová
13 Nov	Virginia Slims Championships; New York City, United States; WTA Championships; Carpet (i) – $1,000,000 – 16S/8D; Singles – Doubles	(West Germany) Steffi Graf; 6–4, 7–5, 2–6, 6–2	(United States) Martina Navratilova	(Argentina) Gabriela Sabatini (Spain) Arantxa Sánchez Vicario	(Czechoslovakia) Helena Suková (United States) Zina Garrison (Bulgaria) Manuela Maleeva-Fragnière (Socialist Federal Republic of Yugoslavia) Monica Seles
13 Nov	Virginia Slims Championships; New York City, United States; WTA Championships; Carpet (i) – $1,000,000 – 16S/8D; Singles – Doubles	(United States) Martina Navratilova (United States) Pam Shriver; 6–3, 6–2	(Soviet Union) Larisa Savchenko (Soviet Union) Natasha Zvereva	(Argentina) Gabriela Sabatini (Spain) Arantxa Sánchez Vicario	(Czechoslovakia) Helena Suková (United States) Zina Garrison (Bulgaria) Manuela Maleeva-Fragnière (Socialist Federal Republic of Yugoslavia) Monica Seles

== Rankings ==
Below are the 1989 WTA year-end rankings (November 26, 1989) in both singles and doubles competition:

Singles Year-end Ranking
No	Player Name	Points	1988	Change
1	Steffi Graf (FRG)	300.9980	1	=
2	Martina Navratilova (USA)	208.1995	2	=
3	Gabriela Sabatini (ARG)	166.5597	4	+1
4	Zina Garrison (USA)	128.4947	9	+5
5	Arantxa Sánchez Vicario (ESP)	121.2214	18	+13
6	Monica Seles (YUG)	117.2153	86	+80
7	Conchita Martínez (ESP)	87.8854	41	+34
8	Helena Suková (TCH)	87.3127	8	=
9	Manuela Maleeva-Fragniere (SUI)	84.0804	6	-3
10	Chris Evert (USA)	79.7917	3	-7
11	Jana Novotná (TCH)	74.7833	35	+24
12	Mary Joe Fernández (USA)	71.5744	15	+3
13	Helen Kelesi (CAN)	52.7489	19	+6
14	Hana Mandlíková (AUS)	51.1944	29	+15
15	Katerina Maleeva (BUL)	51.1071	11	-4
16	Catarina Lindqvist (SWE)	46.6842	42	+26
17	Pam Shriver (USA)	46.0357	5	-12
18	Belinda Cordwell (NZL)	44.7692	61	+43
19	Laura Gildemeister (PER)	44.4286	NR	NR
20	Larisa Savchenko (URS)	43.2813	16	-4

- When Evert played her final tour match at the 1989 US Open, she was world No. 4.

Doubles Year-end Ranking
No	Player Name	Points	1988	Change
1	Martina Navratilova (USA)	361.8135	1	=
2	Helena Suková (TCH)	290.7845	4	+2
3	Larisa Savchenko (URS)	280.1181	9	+6
4	Pam Shriver (USA)	279.7621	2	-2
5	Jana Novotná (TCH)	270.7337	13	+8
6	Natasha Zvereva (URS)	259.5676	11	+5
7	Gigi Fernández (USA)	210.1921	6	-1
8	Mary Joe Fernández (USA)	209.0000	63	+55
9	Zina Garrison (USA)	199.6011	7	-2
10	Katrina Adams (USA)	193.6407	14	+4
11	Steffi Graf (FRG)	174.2000	5	-6
12	Robin White (USA)	168.2980	15	+3
13	Wendy Turnbull (AUS)	167.7390	17	+14
14	Elizabeth Smylie (AUS)	163.7508	20	+6
15	Patty Fendick (USA)	162.9735	18	+3
16	Lori McNeil (USA)	159.6453	10	-6
17	Hana Mandlíková (AUS)	155.3529	60	+43
18	Jill Hetherington (CAN)	151.3596	16	-2
19	Gabriela Sabatini (ARG)	148.700	3	-16
20	Elna Reinach (RSA)	136.4375	42	+22

== See also ==
- 1989 Nabisco Grand Prix
