= 1988 Fernleaf Classic =

- Date: 1–8 February
- Edition: 1st
- Category: Category 1
- Draw: 56S / 24D
- Prize money: $50,000
- Surface: Hard / outdoor
- Location: Wellington, New Zealand

Champions

Singles
- (Canada) Jill Hetherington

Doubles
- (United States) Patty Fendick / (Canada) Jill Hetherington
Wellington Classic	· 1989 →

The 1988 Fernleaf Classic was a women's tennis tournament played on outdoor hard courts in Wellington in New Zealand and was part of the Category 1 tier of the 1988 WTA Tour. The tournament ran from 1 February through 8 February 1988. The singles title was won by 13th seeded Jill Hetherington.

== Finals ==
=== Singles ===
(Canada) Jill Hetherington defeated (United States) Katrina Adams 6–1, 6–1

- It was Hetherington's only singles title of her career.

=== Doubles ===
(United States) Patty Fendick / (Canada) Jill Hetherington defeated (New Zealand) Belinda Cordwell / (New Zealand) Julie Richardson 6–3, 6–3

- It was Fendick's 3rd title of the year and the 3rd of her career. It was Hetherington's 3rd title of the year and the 4th of her career.

== See also ==
- 1988 BP National Championships – men's tournament
