= 1989 WTA Tier I Series =

Women's tennis tournament

Details
- Duration: March 20 – May 15
- Tournaments: 2

Achievements (singles)
- Most titles: (Argentina) Gabriela Sabatini (West Germany) Steffi Graf (1)
- Most finals: (Argentina) Gabriela Sabatini (2)

The table below shows the 1989 WTA Tier I Series schedule.

== Singles ==
Tournament	Surface	Week	Winner	Finalist	Semi finalists	Quarter finalists
Key Biscayne	Hard	March 20	(Argentina) Gabriela Sabatini; 6–1, 4–6, 6–2	(United States) Chris Evert	(Czechoslovakia) Helena Suková (United States) Zina Garrison Jackson	(France) Isabelle Demongeot (Italy) Raffaella Reggi-Concato (Czechoslovakia) Jana Novotná (Canada) Helen Kelesi
Berlin	Clay	May 15	(West Germany) Steffi Graf; 6–3, 6–1	(Argentina) Gabriela Sabatini	(West Germany) Isabel Cueto (Canada) Helen Kelesi	(Italy) Sandra Cecchini (Austria) Barbara Paulus (Czechoslovakia) Regina Rajchrtová (West Germany) Sylvia Hanika

== See also ==
- WTA Tier I events
- 1989 ATP Tour
- 1989 WTA Tour
