= Jo-Anne Faull =

Australian tennis player (born 1971)

- Country (sports): Australia
- Born: 13 January 1971 (age 54) Kadina, Australia
- Prize money: US$ 357,216

Singles
- Career record: 127–139
- Career titles: 0
- Highest ranking: No. 61 (28 August 1989)

Grand Slam singles results
- Australian Open: 2R (1988)
- French Open: 4R (1989)
- Wimbledon: 4R (1989)
- US Open: 1R (1988, 1989)

Doubles
- Career record: 163–116
- Career titles: 2
- Highest ranking: No. 36 (7 December 1992)

Grand Slam doubles results
- Australian Open: QF (1990)
- French Open: 3R (1989, 1990)
- Wimbledon: QF (1992, 1993)
- US Open: 2R (1990, 1991, 1992)

Jo-Anne Faull (born 13 January 1971) is a former Australian tennis player, professionally active from late 1988 to January 1995.

In 1988, she was the world junior champion in women's doubles.

She achieved the best season of her career in 1989, entering the fourth round in two Grand Slam events, at Roland Garros and Wimbledon.

During her career, she won two doubles titles on the WTA Tour, the Wellington Classic in 1991, and the Taipei Championships in 1992.

== WTA career finals ==
=== Singles: 1 (runner-up) ===
Result	No.	Date	Tournament	Surface	Opponent	Score
Loss	1.	Feb 1989	Wellington Classic, New Zealand	Hard	(Spain) Conchita Martínez	1–6, 2–6

=== Doubles: 7 (2 titles, 5 runner-ups) ===
Result	No.	Date	Tournament	Surface	Partner	Opponents	Score
Loss	1.	Feb 1990	Tokyo, Japan	Carpet (i)	(Australia) Rachel McQuillan	(United States) Gigi Fernández (Australia) Liz Smylie	2–6, 2–6
Loss	2.	Sep 1990	Bayonne, France	Carpet (i)	(Australia) Rachel McQuillan	(Australia) Louise Field (France) Catherine Tanvier	6–7^{(3–7)}, 7–6^{(7–5)}, 6–7^{(5–7)}
Loss	3.	Jan 1991	Auckland Open, New Zealand	Hard	(New Zealand) Julie Richardson	(United States) Patty Fendick (Soviet Union) Larisa Neiland	3–6, 3–6
Win	1.	Feb 1991	Wellington Classic, New Zealand	Hard	(New Zealand) Julie Richardson	(United Kingdom) Belinda Borneo (United Kingdom) Clare Wood	2–6, 7–5, 7–6^{(7–4)}
Loss	4.	Feb 1992	Wellington Classic, New Zealand	Hard	(New Zealand) Julie Richardson	(United Kingdom) Belinda Borneo (United Kingdom) Clare Wood	0–6, 6–7^{(5–7)}
Win	2.	Oct 1992	Taipei Championships, Taiwan	Hard	(New Zealand) Julie Richardson	(South Africa) Amanda Coetzer (United States) Cammy MacGregor	3–6, 6–3, 6–2
Loss	5.	Oct 1993	Taipei Championships, Taiwan	Hard	(Australia) Kristine Kunce	(Indonesia) Yayuk Basuki (Japan) Nana Miyagi	4–6, 2–6

== ITF finals ==
Legend
$25,000 tournaments
$10,000 tournaments

=== Doubles (9–2) ===
Result	No.	Date	Location	Surface	Partnering	Opponents	Score
Win	1.	1 November 1987	Gold Coast, Australia	Hard	(Australia) Rachel McQuillan	(Australia) Kirrily Sharpe (Australia) Janine Thompson	4–6, 6–3, 6–3
Win	2.	6 December 1987	Sydney, Australia	Grass	(Australia) Rachel McQuillan	(Australia) Sally McCann (Australia) Kristine Kunce	6–3, 6–2
Win	3.	6 March 1988	Bendigo, Australia	Grass	(Australia) Rachel McQuillan	(Australia) Kate McDonald (Australia) Rennae Stubbs	6–1, 6–3
Win	4.	20 March 1988	Adelaide, Australia	Hard	(Australia) Rachel McQuillan	(Australia) Michelle Bowrey (Australia) Kristine Kunce	6–2, 6–4
Win	5.	27 November 1988	Gold Coast, Australia	Hard	(Australia) Rachel McQuillan	(Australia) Louise Field (Australia) Alison Scott	7–5, 6–4
Win	6.	11 November 1990	Bendigo, Australia	Hard	(France) Noëlle van Lottum	(Australia) Kerry-Anne Guse (Australia) Justine Hodder	7–5, 6–4
Win	7.	25 November 1990	Perth, Australia	Grass	(Australia) Rennae Stubbs	(Australia) Kristin Godridge (Australia) Kirrily Sharpe	6–2, 6–4
Win	8.	10 November 1991	Port Pirie, Australia	Grass	(Australia) Michelle Jaggard-Lai	(Australia) Kerry-Anne Guse (Australia) Justine Hodder	6–2, 7–5
Win	9.	24 November 1991	Nuriootpa, Australia	Hard	(Australia) Rennae Stubbs	(Mexico) Lupita Novelo (United States) Terri O'Reilly	6–4, 7–5
Loss	1.	14 November 1993	Bendigo, Australia	Hard	(Australia) Kirrily Sharpe	(Australia) Catherine Barclay (Australia) Kerry-Anne Guse	2–6, 6–3, 6–7
Loss	2.	5 December 1993	Mildura, Australia	Hard	(Australia) Kirrily Sharpe	(Australia) Catherine Barclay (Australia) Kerry-Anne Guse	3–6, 2–6

== Award and career timeline ==
Note	Event
Award	List of Australian Open champions
Award	List of Grand Slam girls' doubles champions
Award	List of Grand Slam girls' singles champions
Award	ITF World Champions
Award	List of Wimbledon Open Era champions
Award	List of female tennis players
Career	1988 Australian Open
Career	1988 Wimbledon Championships
Career	1989 Citizen Cup – Doubles
Career	1989 Fernleaf Classic
Career	1989 Fernleaf Classic – Doubles
Career	1989 Fernleaf Classic – Singles
Career	1989 Internationaux de Strasbourg – Doubles
Career	1989 US Open – Women's singles
Career	1989 US Open (tennis)
Career	1989 WTA Tour
Career	1990 Australian Open – Women's doubles
Career	1990 WTA Tour
Career	1991 Australian Open – Women's doubles
Career	1991 Dow Classic
Career	1991 Lipton International Players Championships – Women's singles
Career	1991 WTA Tour
Career	1992 Dow Classic – Doubles
Career	1992 Wimbledon Championships – Women's doubles
Career	1992 WTA Tour
Career	1993 DFS Classic – Doubles
Career	1993 Wimbledon Championships – Women's doubles
Career	1993 WTA Tour
Career	1994 Danone Hardcourt Championships – Doubles
Other	International Tennis Federation
Other	Pan Pacific Open
Other	Taiwan Open
Other	Wellington Classic
Other	WTA Bayonne
