= Henrike Kadzidroga =

German tennis player (born 1971)

- Country (sports): West Germany; Germany
- Born: 31 May 1971 (age 55) Bad Kissingen, West Germany
- Prize money: $26,508

Singles
- Career titles: 0
- Highest ranking: No. 230 (17 September 1990)

Doubles
- Career titles: 2 ITF
- Highest ranking: No. 212 (15 July 1991)

Henrike Tehrani (born Henrike Kadzidroga; 31 May 1971) is a German former professional tennis player.

Born in Bad Kissingen, Kadzidroga competed on the professional tour from 1988 to 1992. She reached a best singles ranking of 230 in the world and qualified for four WTA Tour singles main draws, including Paris twice.

Kadzidroga is now a general practitioner in the town of Hennef.

== ITF finals ==
$25,000 tournaments
$10,000 tournaments

=== Singles (0–1) ===
Result	No.	Date	Tournament	Surface	Opponent	Score
Loss	1.	8 August 1988	ITF Darmstadt, West Germany	Clay	(West Germany) Vera-Carina Elter	6–4, 2–6, 5–7

=== Doubles (2–5) ===
Result	No.	Date	Tournament	Surface	Partner	Opponents	Score
Win	1.	27 June 1988	ITF Neumünster, West Germany	Clay	(Hungary) Antonia Homolya	(Czechoslovakia) Petra Langrová (Czechoslovakia) Hana Fukárková	6–1, 6–2
Loss	1.	18 July 1988	ITF Rheda, West Germany	Clay	(New Zealand) Claudine Toleafoa	(Greece) Alice Danila (West Germany) Gabriela Dinu	6–1, 2–6, 6–7
Loss	2.	24 July 1989	ITF Kitzbühel, Austria	Clay	(Netherlands) Nathalie van Dierendonck	(Hungary) Réka Szikszay (Czechoslovakia) Jitka Dubcová	2–6, 4–6
Loss	3.	3 June 1991	ITF Mondorf, Luxembourg	Clay	(Czechoslovakia) Denisa Krajčovičová	(Czechoslovakia) Radka Bobková (Spain) Ana Segura	1–6, 4–6
Loss	4.	1 July 1991	ITF Stuttgart, Germany	Clay	(Uruguay) Patricia Miller	(United States) Lisa Seemann (Austria) Heidi Sprung	6–7, 1–6
Win	2.	17 August 1992	ITF Kaiserslautern, Germany	Clay	(Germany) Eva-Maria Schürhoff	(Germany) Saskia Zink (Hungary) Virág Csurgó	2–6, 7–5, 6–3
Loss	5.	14 September 1992	ITF Haifa, Israel	Hard	(Germany) Claudia Timm	(Israel) Yael Segal (Belgium) Vanessa Matthys	7–5, 0–6, 2–6
