= 1989 Fernleaf Classic =

- Date: 6–12 February
- Edition: 2nd
- Category: 1
- Draw: 32S / 16D
- Prize money: $50,000
- Surface: Hard / outdoor
- Location: Wellington, New Zealand

Champions

Singles
- (Spain) Conchita Martínez

Doubles
- (Australia) Elizabeth Smylie / (Australia) Janine Thompson
← 1988 ·	Wellington Classic	· 1990 →

The 1989 Fernleaf Classic was a women's tennis tournament played on outdoor hard courts in Wellington, New Zealand, and was part of the Category 1 tier of the 1989 WTA Tour. It was the 2nd edition of the tournament and was held from 6 February until 12 February 1989. First-seeded Conchita Martínez won the singles title.

== Finals ==
=== Singles ===
(Spain) Conchita Martínez defeated (Australia) Jo-Anne Faull 6–1, 6–2

- It was Martínez's 1st singles title of the year and the 2nd of her career.

=== Doubles ===
(Australia) Elizabeth Smylie / (Australia) Janine Thompson defeated (Australia) Tracey Morton / (Austria) Heidi Sprung 7–6^{(7–3)}, 6–1

- It was Smylie's 1st title of the year and the 22nd of her career. It was Thompson's 1st title of the year and the 3rd of her career.

== See also ==
- 1989 BP National Championships – men's tournament
