= Leigh-Anne Eldredge =

American tennis player (born 1964)

- Country (sports): United States
- Born: December 14, 1964 (age 60); Pasadena, California, U.S.
- Prize money: $47,469

Singles
- Highest ranking: No. 112 (April 24, 1989)

Grand Slam singles results
- Australian Open: 3R (1988)
- French Open: 1R (1989)
- Wimbledon: 1R (1989)
- US Open: 1R (1982, 1986)

Doubles
- Highest ranking: No. 214 (September 11, 1987)

Grand Slam doubles results
- Australian Open: 1R (1988)
- Wimbledon: 2R (1989)

Leigh-Anne Eldredge (born December 14, 1964) is an American former professional tennis player.

== Biography ==
Eldredge was born in Pasadena played college tennis at Stanford for four years. A three-time All-American, she partnered with Linda Gates to win the 1985 NCAA Division I doubles title.

From 1987 to 1989, Eldredge competed on the professional tour and reached a best singles ranking of 112 in the world. She featured in the main draw of all four grand slam tournaments, which included a third round appearance at the 1988 Australian Open. Her best performance on the WTA Tour came at the 1989 Wellington Classic, where she made it through to the semi-finals.
