= Tracey Morton-Rodgers =

Australian tennis player

Tracey Rodgers
- Full name: Tracey Jane Rodgers
- Country (sports): Australia
- Born: 18 December 1967 (age 58) Brisbane, Australia
- Plays: Right handed
- Prize money: $195,755

Singles
- Highest ranking: No. 201 (8 February 1993)

Grand Slam singles results
- Australian Open: 1R (1990, 1991)
- Wimbledon: 1R (1989)

Doubles
- Highest ranking: No. 94 (29 July 1991)

Grand Slam doubles results
- Australian Open: 3R (1992)
- French Open: 3R (1991, 1992)
- Wimbledon: 2R (1992)
- US Open: 2R (1991, 1992, 1996)

Grand Slam mixed doubles results
- French Open: QF (1991)
- Wimbledon: 2R (1994)

Tracey Morton-Rodgers (born 18 December 1967) is a former professional tennis player from Australia. Her maiden name is Morton and she began competing as Morton-Rodgers in 1994

== Career ==
Morton, who comes from Queensland, was most successful as a doubles player, reaching the world's top 100. She was runner-up at the 1989 Fernleaf Classic held in Wellington, partnering Heidi Sprung. In addition she made the semi-finals of a further seven WTA Tour tournaments.

=== Grand Slam ===
Morton featured in the women's doubles draws at all four grand slam tournaments, with her partners including Jenny Byrne, Nana Smith, Karin Kschwendt, Anne Minter, Kerry-Ann Guse and Alexandra Fusai. All of her third round appearance came when partnering with British player Clare Wood. It was Wood who beat her when she made the singles draw as a qualifier at the 1989 Wimbledon Championships. Her other two grand slam singles main draws were as a wildcard at the Australian Open, the first in 1990, where she lost to fourth seed and eventual semi-finalist Helena Suková in the opening round. At the 1991 Australian Open she took Jo Durie to three sets in another first round loss. She made the mixed doubles quarter-finals at the 1991 French Open paired with David Macpherson.

== WTA Tour finals ==
=== Doubles (0-1) ===
Result	Date	Tournament	Tier	Surface	Partner	Opponents	Score
Loss	Feb 1989	Wellington, New Zealand	Category 1	Hard	(Austria) Heidi Sprung	(Australia) Elizabeth Smylie (Australia) Janine Tremelling	6–7^{(3–7)}, 1–6

== ITF finals ==
$50,000 tournaments
$25,000 tournaments
$10,000 tournaments

=== Singles (1–3) ===
Result	No.	Date	Tournament	Surface	Opponent	Score
Loss	1.	19 February 1989	Adelaide, Australia	Hard	(Australia) Sally McCann	3–6, 1–6
Loss	2.	11 November 1990	Mount Gambier, Australia	Hard	(Australia) Michelle Jaggard-Lai	6–7, 3–6
Win	1.	17 February 1991	Mildura, Australia	Grass	(Australia) Louise Stacey	6–3, 6–4
Loss	3.	10 March 1991	Bendigo, Australia	Grass	(Australia) Clare Thompson	3–6, 2–6

=== Doubles (3–8) ===
Result	No.	Date	Tournament	Surface	Partner	Opponents	Score
Loss	1.	11 July 1988	Erlangen, West Germany	Clay	(Australia) Lisa Weerasekera	(South Africa) Linda Barnard (South Africa) Amanda Coetzer	2–6, 0–6
Loss	2.	1 August 1988	Kitzbühel, Austria	Clay	(Australia) Lisa Weerasekera	(Czechoslovakia) Petra Holubová (Czechoslovakia) Sylvia Štefková	6–7^{(4–7)}, 2–6
Win	1.	12 September 1988	Arzachena, Italy	Hard	(United States) Anne Grousbeck	(Spain) Rosa Bielsa (Spain) Janet Souto	7–5, 6–1
Win	2.	18 February 1991	Wodonga, Australia	Grass	(Australia) Alison Scott	(Australia) Kristine Kunce (Australia) Clare Thompson	6–4, 4–6, 7–6
Loss	3.	25 February 1991	Canberra, Australia	Grass	(Australia) Alison Scott	(Mexico) Lupita Novelo (United States) Betsy Somerville	5–7, 6–3, 4–6
Loss	4.	1 March 1992	Miami, United States	Hard	(Japan) Tamaka Takagi	(United States) Lindsay Davenport (United States) Katie Schlukebir	1–6, 3–6
Loss	5.	27 April 1992	Jakarta, Indonesia	Clay	(New Zealand) Julie Richardson	(Australia) Kerry-Anne Guse (Australia) Kristine Kunce	6–7, 2–6
Win	3.	24 January 1994	Austin, United States	Hard	(France) Sophie Amiach	(United States) Jean Ceniza (South Africa) Mareze Joubert	7–6^{(10–8)}, 7–6^{(7–5)}
Loss	6.	6 February 1994	Midland, United States	Hard (i)	(United States) Vickie Paynter	(United States) Erica Adams (United States) Jeri Ingram	1–6, 7–5, 4–6
Loss	7.	29 October 1995	Lakeland, United States	Hard	(United States) Sandra Cacic	(Czech Republic) Eva Martincová (Bulgaria) Elena Pampoulova	6–1, 2–6, 1–6
Loss	8.	11 August 1996	Austin, United States	Hard	(United States) Audra Keller	(United States) Laxmi Poruri (Japan) Nana Smith	7–5, 5–7, 2–6
