= Elizabeth Daly =

American writer (1878–1967)

- Born: Elizabeth Teresa Daly; October 15, 1878; New York City
- Died: September 2, 1967 (aged 88); Roslyn, New York
- Education: Bryn Mawr College, 1901, A.B.; Columbia University, 1902, M.A.
- Occupation: Mystery writer
- Parent(s): Joseph F. Daly and Emma Barker Daly
- Relatives: Augustin Daly (uncle)
- Writing career
- Notable awards: Edgar Allan Poe Award (Special Edgar) 1961

Elizabeth T. Daly (October 15, 1878 – September 2, 1967) was an American writer of mystery novels whose main character, Henry Gamadge, was a bookish author, bibliophile, and amateur detective. A writer of light verse and prose for Life, Puck, and Scribner's magazines in her earlier years, Daly published her first Gamadge novel, Unexpected Night, at age 62. Between 1940 and 1951, she published 16 novels featuring Gamadge.

Her career included two years as a reader at Bryn Mawr College, 1904–06. At other times, she tutored in French and English, and she was a producer of amateur theater.

== Personal life ==
Born Elizabeth Teresa Daly in 1878 in New York City, she was the daughter of Joseph F. Daly, a New York Supreme Court justice, and Emma Barker Daly. Her uncle was the famous playwright and producer Augustin Daly. Daly had two brothers, Edward and Wilfred. When she was eight, her mother died and her father remarried four years later. Daly graduated from Bryn Mawr College with an A.B. in 1901, and from Columbia University with an M.A. in 1902. She was an honorary member of the Mystery Writers of America. She died in Roslyn, New York, in 1967 at age 88.

== Critical reception ==
Charles Shibuk, in St. James Guide to Crime and Mystery Writers, said that Daly was Agatha Christie's favorite American mystery writer. Daly successfully used many of the literary conventions employed by Christie and other writers of the Golden Age of Detective Fiction, he said, and "was always both civilized and literate". The Mystery Writers of America, referring to her as "the grande dame of women mystery writers", awarded her a "Special Edgar" in 1961.

== Bibliography ==
=== Henry Gamadge novels ===
- Unexpected Night (1940)
- Deadly Nightshade (1940)
- Murders in Volume 2 (1941)
- The House Without the Door (1942)
- Nothing Can Rescue Me (1943)
- Evidence of Things Seen (1943)
- Arrow Pointing Nowhere (1944) (Also published as Murder Listens In)
- The Book of the Dead (1944)
- Any Shape or Form (1945)
- Somewhere in the House (1946)
- The Wrong Way Down (1946)
- Night Walk (1947)
- The Book of the Lion (1948)
- And Dangerous to Know (1949)
- The Book of the Crime (1951)
- Death and Letters (1953)
- An Elizabeth Daly Mystery Omnibus: Three Henry Gamadge Novels (includes Murders in Volume 2, Evidence of Things Seen, and The Book of the Dead) (1960)

=== Other ===
- The Street Has Changed (1941)
