= Belinda Cordwell =

Tennis player from New Zealand

- Country (sports): New Zealand
- Residence: Wairarapa, New Zealand
- Born: 21 September 1965 (age 61) Wellington, New Zealand
- Turned pro: 19 July 1982
- Retired: 23 September 1991
- Plays: Left (one-handed backhand)
- Prize money: $322,874

Singles
- Career record: 157–120
- Career titles: 1 WTA, 5 ITF
- Highest ranking: No. 17 (4 December 1989)

Grand Slam singles results
- Australian Open: SF (1989)
- French Open: 1R (1986)
- Wimbledon: 3R (1987, 1988)
- US Open: 3R (1985)

Other tournaments
- Olympic Games: 1R (1988)

Doubles
- Career record: 122–99
- Career titles: 2 WTA, 11 ITF
- Highest ranking: No. 35 (8 May 1989)

Grand Slam doubles results
- Australian Open: 3R 1989)
- French Open: 1R (1986)
- Wimbledon: 3R (1987)
- US Open: 2R (1987, 1988, 1990)

Belinda Jane Cordwell (born 21 September 1965) is a sports commentator and a former professional tennis player from New Zealand, who represented her native country at the 1988 Summer Olympics in Seoul. A former top 20 player, her best result at Grand Slam tournaments was reaching the semifinals of the 1989 Australian Open. Cordwell remains the highest ever ranked New Zealand singles player, either male or female in the Open era.

== Biography ==
During her career, Cordwell won one WTA Tour singles title (Singapore) and two tour doubles titles (at Singapore & Tokyo). Cordwell reached her highest WTA ranking on 4 December 1989, when she became No. 17 in the world. Her most notable result was reaching the semifinals of the Australian Open in 1989, losing to Helena Suková. She represented New Zealand at the 1988 Summer Olympics, losing in the first round to Great Britain's Sara Gomer. After retiring Cordwell has worked as a television tennis commentator for One Sport and Sky Sport.

== Grand Slam tournament performance timelines ==
Key
| W | F | SF | QF | #R | RR | Q# | DNQ | A | NH |

(W) winner; (F) finalist; (SF) semifinalist; (QF) quarterfinalist; (#R) rounds 4, 3, 2, 1; (RR) round-robin stage; (Q#) qualification round; (DNQ) did not qualify; (A) absent; (NH) not held; (SR) strike rate (events won / competed); (W–L) win–loss record.

=== Singles ===
| Tournament | 1985 | 1986 | 1987 | 1988 | 1989 | 1990 | 1991 | W–L | Win % |
|---|---|---|---|---|---|---|---|---|---|
| Australian Open | A | A | 2R | 4R | SF | A | 1R | 9–4 | 69% |
| French Open | A | 1R | A | A | A | A | A | 0–1 | 0% |
| Wimbledon | Q3 | 1R | 3R | 3R | A | 1R | Q2 | 4–4 | 50% |
| US Open | 3R | Q2 | Q3 | 1R | A | 2R | Q1 | 3–3 | 50% |
| Win–loss | 2–1 | 0–2 | 3–2 | 5–3 | 5–1 | 1–2 | 0–1 | 16–12 | 57% |

=== Doubles ===
| Tournament | 1985 | 1986 | 1987 | 1988 | 1989 | 1990 | 1991 | W–L | Win % |
|---|---|---|---|---|---|---|---|---|---|
| Australian Open | 1R | A | 2R | 2R | 3R | A | 2R | 5–5 | 50% |
| French Open | A | 1R | A | A | A | A | A | 0–1 | 0% |
| Wimbledon | 1R | 2R | 3R | 1R | A | 1R | 1R | 3–6 | 33% |
| US Open | A | 1R | 2R | 2R | A | 2R | 1R | 3–5 | 38% |
| Win–loss | 0–2 | 1–3 | 4–3 | 2–3 | 2–1 | 1–2 | 1–3 | 11–17 | 39% |

== WTA Tour finals ==
=== Singles (1 title, 1 runner-up) ===
| Result | W/L | Date | Tournament | Surface | Opponent | Score |
|---|---|---|---|---|---|---|
| Loss | 0–1 | Feb 1989 | Auckland Open, New Zealand | Hard | (United States) Patty Fendick | 2–6, 0–6 |
| Win | 1–1 | Apr 1989 | Singapore Open | Hard | (Japan) Akiko Kijimuta | 6–1, 6–0 |

=== Doubles (2 titles, 3 runner-ups) ===
| Result | W/L | Date | Tournament | Surface | Partner | Opponents | Score |
|---|---|---|---|---|---|---|---|
| Win | 1–0 | Oct 1985 | Japan Open | Hard | (New Zealand) Julie Richardson | (Peru) Laura Gildemeister (United States) Beth Herr | 6–4, 6–4 |
| Loss | 1–1 | Feb 1988 | Wellington Classic, New Zealand | Hard | (New Zealand) Julie Richardson | (United States) Patty Fendick (Canada) Jill Hetherington | 3–6, 3–6 |
| Loss | 1–2 | Apr 1988 | Taipei Championships, Taiwan | Carpet (i) | (New Zealand) Julie Richardson | (United States) Patty Fendick (United States) Ann Henricksson | 2–6, 6–2, 2–6 |
| Loss | 1–3 | Jun 1988 | Eastbourne International, England | Grass | (South Africa) Dinky Van Rensburg | (West Germany) Eva Pfaff (Australia) Elizabeth Smylie | 4–6, 6–7 |
| Win | 2–3 | Apr 1989 | Singapore Open | Hard | (Australia) Elizabeth Smylie | (United States) Ann Henricksson (United States) Beth Herr | 6–7^{(6–8)}, 6–2, 6–1 |

== ITF Circuit finals ==
Legend
$50,000 tournaments
$25,000 tournaments
$10,000 tournaments

=== Singles: 6 (5–1) ===
| Result | W/L | Date | Tournament | Surface | Opponent | Score |
|---|---|---|---|---|---|---|
| Win | 1–0 | 10 October 1983 | ITF Newcastle, Australia | Grass | (United States) Deeann Hansel | 6–1, 6–2 |
| Win | 2–0 | 25 February 1985 | ITF Tasmania, Australia | Hard | (Australia) Rebecca Bryant | 4–6, 6–3, 7–6 |
| Loss | 2–1 | 11 March 1985 | ITF Adelaide, Australia | Hard | (Australia) Louise Field | 3–6, 1–6 |
| Win | 3–1 | 29 April 1985 | ITF Canberra, Australia | Grass | (Australia) Rebecca Bryant | 6–2, 4–6, 6–4 |
| Win | 4–1 | 16 March 1987 | ITF Canberra, Australia | Hard | (Norway) Amy Jönsson Raaholt | 6–3, 6–2 |
| Win | 5–1 | 30 March 1987 | ITF Adelaide, Australia | Hard | (Australia) Louise Field | 6–0, 4–6, 6–4 |

=== Doubles: 17 (11–6) ===
| Result | No. | Date | Tournament | Surface | Partner | Opponents | Score |
|---|---|---|---|---|---|---|---|
| Win | 1. | 28 May 1984 | ITF Flemington, United States | Hard | (New Zealand) Julie Richardson | (United States) Beverly Bowes (United States) Becky Callan | 6–0, 6–1 |
| Win | 2. | 25 June 1984 | ITF Chatham, United States | Hard | (New Zealand) Julie Richardson | (Australia) Rebecca Bryant (United States) Aschara Maranon | 6–2, 6–0 |
| Loss | 3. | 2 July 1984 | ITF Detroit, United States | Hard | (Australia) Rebecca Bryant | (United States) Patty Fendick (United States) Linda Howell | 4–6, 6–7 |
| Win | 4. | 9 July 1984 | ITF West Palm Beach, United States | Clay | (New Zealand) Julie Richardson | (United States) Patty Fendick (United States) Linda Howell | 7–6, 6–7, 6–3 |
| Win | 5. | 30 July 1984 | ITF Delray Beach, United States | Hard | (New Zealand) Julie Richardson | (United States) Linda Gates (United States) Cynthia MacGregor | 7–5, 6–0 |
| Loss | 6. | 8 October 1984 | ITF Wyong, Australia | Grass | (Australia) Colleen Carney | (Sweden) Stina Almgren (Sweden) Helena Olsson | 5–7, 5–7 |
| Win | 7. | 15 October 1984 | ITF Newcastle, United States | Grass | (New Zealand) Julie Richardson | (Australia) Amanda Tobin (Australia) Annette Gulley | 6–3, 6–2 |
| Win | 8. | 22 October 1984 | ITF Sydney, Australia | Clay | (New Zealand) Julie Richardson | (Australia) Jackie Masters (New Zealand) Michelle Parun | 6–0, 6–2 |
| Loss | 9. | 22 October 1984 | ITF Sydney, Australia | Grass | (New Zealand) Julie Richardson | (United States) Diane Farrell (Australia) Annette Gulley | 3–6, 3–6 |
| Win | 10. | 11 March 1985 | ITF Adelaide, Australia | Hard | (New Zealand) Julie Richardson | (Australia) Louise Field (Australia) Janine Thompson | 6–2, 2–6, 6–2 |
| Loss | 11. | 30 September 1985 | ITF Chiba, Japan | Hard | (New Zealand) Julie Richardson | (Brazil) Niege Dias (Brazil) Patricia Medrado | 6–4, 4–6, 4–6 |
| Win | 12. | 6 October 1986 | ITF Chiba, Japan | Hard | (Australia) Michelle Jaggard-Lai | (Japan) Kumiko Okamoto (Japan) Naoko Sato | 6–2, 7–6^{(3)} |
| Loss | 13. | 3 November 1986 | ITF Matsuyama, Japan | Hard | (United States) Wendy Wood | (Indonesia) Yayuk Basuki (Indonesia) Suzanna Wibowo | 6–0, 4–6, 2–6 |
| Win | 14. | 23 March 1987 | ITF Melbourne, Australia | Hard | (Australia) Louise Field | (Australia) Colleen Carney (Sweden) Anna-Karin Olsson | 6–2, 3–6, 6–3 |
| Win | 15. | 30 March 1987 | ITF Adelaide, Australia | Hard | (Australia) Louise Field | (Australia) Colleen Carney (Australia) Alison Scott | 6–1, 1–6, 6–4 |
| Win | 16. | 8 August 1988 | ITF York, United States | Hard | (Australia) Kristine Kunce | (United States) Allyson Ingram (United States) Jennifer Young | 6–3, 6–1 |
| Loss | 17. | 25 September 1989 | ITF Chiba, Japan | Hard | (New Zealand) Julie Richardson | (Japan) Ei Iida (Japan) Maya Kidowaki | 6–7, 4–6 |
