= Wellington Classic =

Defunct tennis tournament
- Event name: Fernleaf Classic
- Tour: WTA Tour
- Founded: 1988
- Abolished: 1992
- Editions: 5
- Location: Wellington, New Zealand
- Category: Tier V (1990–92)
- Surface: Hard

The Wellington Classic (also known by its corporate title of the Fernleaf Classic) is a defunct WTA Tour affiliated tennis tournament played from 1988 to 1992. It was held in Wellington in New Zealand and was played on outdoor hard courts. Between 1990 and 1992 the tournament was part of the WTA Tier V Series

The only New Zealander to taste success at the event was Julie Richardson in the 1991 doubles competition, partnering Australian Jo-Anne Faull.

== Prize money ==
Year	Prize money
1988	$50,000
1989	$50,000
1990	$75,000
1991	$100,000
1992	$100,000

== Finals ==
=== Singles ===
Year	Champions	Runners-up	Score
1988	(Canada) Jill Hetherington	(United States) Katrina Adams	6–1, 6–1
1989	(Spain) Conchita Martínez	(Australia) Jo-Anne Faull	6–1, 6–2
1990	(West Germany) Wiltrud Probst	(Soviet Union) Leila Meskhi	1–6, 6–4, 6–0
1991	(Soviet Union) Leila Meskhi	(Czechoslovakia) Andrea Strnadová	3–6, 7–6^{(7–3)}, 6–2
1992	(France) Noëlle van Lottum	(United States) Donna Faber	6–4, 6–0

=== Doubles ===
Year	Champions	Runners-up	Score
1988	(United States) Patty Fendick (Canada) Jill Hetherington	(New Zealand) Belinda Cordwell (New Zealand) Julie Richardson	6–3, 6–3
1989	(Australia) Elizabeth Smylie (Australia) Janine Tremelling	(Australia) Tracey Morton (Austria) Heidi Sprung	7–6, 6–1
1990	(Soviet Union) Natalia Medvedeva (Soviet Union) Leila Meskhi	(Australia) Michelle Jaggard (New Zealand) Julie Richardson	6–3, 2–6, 6–4
1991	(Australia) Jo-Anne Faull (New Zealand) Julie Richardson	(United Kingdom) Belinda Borneo (United Kingdom) Clare Wood	2–6, 7–5, 7–6
1992	(United Kingdom) Belinda Borneo (United Kingdom) Clare Wood	(Australia) Jo-Anne Faull (New Zealand) Julie Richardson	6–0, 7–6
