= Claudine Toleafoa =

New Zealand tennis player

- Full name: Claudine Punipuao Toleafoa
- Country (sports): New Zealand
- Born: 28 February 1970 (age 55); Auckland, New Zealand
- Prize money: $115,616

Singles
- Highest ranking: No. 121 (28 January 1991)

Grand Slam singles results
- Australian Open: 2R (1991)
- Wimbledon: 1R (1991)

Doubles
- Highest ranking: No. 128 (17 September 1990)

Grand Slam doubles results
- Australian Open: 2R (1990)
- US Open: 1R (1990)

Claudine Punipuao Toleafoa (born 28 February 1970) is a former professional tennis player from New Zealand.

== Biography ==
=== Early years ===
Toleafoa was born in Auckland and is of Samoan heritage, with her father Afamasaga Fa'amatala coming from Fasito'o Tai on the island of Upolu. Her mother, Phillipa Lousley, is from Dunedin. As a child she lived for a time in Samoa and represented the country in tennis at the 1985 South Pacific Mini Games.

During her junior career she made the girls' doubles quarter-finals at both the 1987 and 1988 US Open competitions.

=== Tennis career ===
Toleafoa began playing for the New Zealand Federation Cup team in 1989 and won her debut match over Italy's world number 25 Sandra Cecchini, 10–8 in the third set, to help the side win the World Group tie.

On the WTA Tour her best results came at her home tournament, the Wellington Classic. In 1990 she beat two seeded players, Donna Faber and Sandra Wasserman, to reach the semi-finals, then in 1991 made the quarter-finals, beating third seed Larisa Neiland en route. In addition to her singles performances at Wellington she also twice made the semi-finals of the doubles.

She appeared in the main singles draw of the 1991 Australian Open and made the second round, defeating Stephanie Rottier, which resulted in her career best ranking of 121 following the tournament. At the 1991 French Open she fell in the qualifying draw, then lost in the final round of qualifying at the 1991 Wimbledon Championships, but received entry into the main draw as a lucky loser. She lost in the opening round of Wimbledon to Julie Halard, in three sets.

In 1992 she played Steffi Graf in a Federation Cup tie, then from 1993 until her retirement in 1996 only came up against opponents from the Asia/Oceania Zone, as New Zealand had dropped out of the World Group. She finished her Federation Cup career with a 17/16 overall record, from 25 ties.

=== Personal life ===
Toleafoa is married to Australian former professional tennis player Carl Limberger.

She now works in Auckland as a lawyer and was previously a prosecutor for NZ Police.

== ITF finals ==
Legend
$25,000 tournaments
$10,000 tournaments

=== Singles (0-3) ===
Result	No.	Date	Tournament	Surface	Opponent	Score
Loss	1.	20 February 1989	Melbourne, Australia	Hard	(Australia) Janine Thompson	1–6, 3–6
Loss	2.	19 June 1989	Brindisi, Italy	Clay	(France) Maïder Laval	6–4, 5–7, 1–6
Loss	3.	1 August 1994	Norfolk, United States	Hard	(United States) Karin Miller	6–2, 2–6, 3–6

=== Doubles (3-3) ===
Result	No.	Date	Location	Surface	Partner	Opponents	Score
Loss	1.	18 July 1988	Rheda-Wiedenbrück, West Germany	Clay	(West Germany) Henrike Kadzidroga	(Greece) Alice Danila (West Germany) Gabriela Dinu	6–1, 2–6, 6–7
Loss	2.	11 June 1989	Milan, Italy	Clay	(New Zealand) Ruth Seeman	(Indonesia) Yayuk Basuki (Indonesia) Suzanna Wibowo	7–5, 4–6, 2–6
Win	3.	18 September 1989	Bangkok, Thailand	Hard	(United Kingdom) Valda Lake	(Hong Kong) Paulette Moreno (Denmark) Karin Ptaszek	7–6, 1–6, 7–5
Win	4.	20 November 1989	Bulleen, Australia	Hard	(Japan) Rika Hiraki	(Netherlands) Ingelise Driehuis (United States) Alysia May	7–6, 6–4
Win	5.	25 July 1994	Roanoke, United States	Hard	(Australia) Gail Biggs	(Puerto Rico) Kristina Brandi (United States) Karin Miller	4–6, 6–3, 7–5
Loss	6.	1 August 1994	Norfolk, United States	Hard	(Australia) Gail Biggs	(United States) Karin Miller (United States) Varalee Sureephong	3–6, 6–4, 2–6
