= Ruth Seeman =

New Zealand tennis player

- Country (sports): New Zealand
- Born: 14 April 1963 (age 61); London, England
- Prize money: $33,874

Singles
- Career titles: 1 ITF
- Highest ranking: No. 212 (23 May 1988)

Doubles
- Career titles: 0
- Highest ranking: No. 193 (2 February 1987)

Grand Slam doubles results
- Australian Open: 1R (1990)

Ruth Seeman (born 14 April 1963) is a former professional tennis player from New Zealand.

== Biography ==
Seeman had a career high singles ranking of 212 in the world, with her best performance a round of 16 appearance at Auckland in 1988. As a doubles player she was a semifinalist at Wellington in 1989 and featured in the main draw of the 1990 Australian Open.

Her career included a Fed Cup tie in 1989, as a member of the New Zealand side that defeated Italy in Tokyo. Her only appearance in the tie came in the doubles, a dead rubber, which she and Julie Richardson lost to Laura Garrone and Laura Golarsa.

She now works as a physiotherapist in Christchurch.

== ITF finals ==
=== Singles (1–2) ===
Result	No.	Date	Location	Surface	Opponent	Score
Loss	1.	6 July 1986	ITF Tampa, United States	Clay	(United States) Kathrin Keil	6–7, 4–6
Loss	2.	20 July 1986	ITF Midland, United States	Clay	(South Africa) Karen Schimper	3–6, 2–6
Win	1.	5 June 1989	ITF Milan, Italy	Clay	(Finland) Nanne Dahlman	7–6, 6–3

=== Doubles (0–3) ===
Result	No.	Date	Tournament	Surface	Partner	Opponents	Score
Loss	1.	14 July 1986	ITF Midland, United States	Clay	(Australia) Alison Scott	(United States) Katrina Adams (United States) Sonia Hahn	6–2, 3–6, 4–6
Loss	2.	11 June 1989	ITF Milan, Italy	Clay	(New Zealand) Claudine Toleafoa	(Indonesia) Yayuk Basuki (Indonesia) Suzanna Wibowo	7–5, 4–6, 2–6
Loss	3.	16 July 1990	ITF Schwarzach, Austria	Clay	(West Germany) Cora Linneman	(Netherlands) Ingelise Driehuis (Australia) Louise Pleming	2–6, 0–6
