= Clare Wood =

British tennis player

- Full name: Clare Jacqueline Wood
- Country (sports): United Kingdom
- Residence: London, England
- Born: 8 March 1968 (age 58) Zululand, South Africa
- Height: 1.75 cm (5 ft 9 in)
- Turned pro: 1984
- Retired: 1997
- Plays: Right-handed (two-handed backhand)
- Prize money: $564,182

Singles
- Career record: 212–233
- Career titles: 0 WTA, 1 ITF
- Highest ranking: 77 (2 May 1994)

Grand Slam singles results
- Australian Open: 3R (1991)
- French Open: 2R (1994)
- Wimbledon: 2R (1989, 1993)
- US Open: 2R (1990, 1992, 1993)

Doubles
- Career record: 156–186
- Career titles: 1 WTA, 6 ITF
- Highest ranking: 59 (21 October 1996)

Grand Slam doubles results
- Australian Open: 3R (1992, 1996)
- French Open: 3R (1991, 1992)
- Wimbledon: 3R (1993, 1997)
- US Open: 2R (1991, 1992)

Mixed doubles
- Career titles: 0

Grand Slam mixed doubles results
- Australian Open: 1R (1992)
- French Open: 3R (1992, 1995)
- Wimbledon: QF (1995)
- US Open: -
- Last updated on: 20 July 2011.

Clare Jacqueline Wood (born 8 March 1968) is a former British number 1 tennis player from Great Britain who began playing professionally in 1984 and retired in 1998. Over the course of her career, she reached a career-high singles ranking of world No. 77 in singles (achieved 2 May 1994) and No. 59 in doubles (achieved 21 October 1996). Wood won one ITF singles title and six in doubles as well as won a WTA doubles title at the 1992 Wellington Classic, having been the runner-up the previous year. At the time of her retirement, she had a 212–223 singles win–loss record with notable wins over Jo Durie and Mary Pierce.

After her retirement from professional competition, Wood became a tennis officiator. From 1999 until 2002, she was a tournament supervisor on the WTA Tour, and from 2002 onward, she was an assistant referee at Wimbledon where she was responsible for the qualifying and junior events. In 2004, she was an assistant referee at the 2004 Olympic tennis event, and in 2008, it was announced that she would fulfil, the role of tennis competition manager at the 2012 Olympic Games.

== Wightman Cup ==
When Wood lost to Jennifer Capriati on 14 September 1989, her opponent became the youngest ever Wightman Cup player, and the first player for four years to win a Wightman Cup match 6–0, 6–0.

== Fed Cup ==
Wood played 28 singles and 24 doubles matches for Great Britain in the Fed Cup from 1988 to 1997.

== Olympic Games ==
Wood represented the United Kingdom in the Olympic Games in 1988, 1992 and 1996,

== WTA tour and ITF circuit finals ==
=== Singles: 2 (1–1) ===
Legend Grand Slam tournaments (0–0) WTA Tour Championships (0–0) WTA Tier I (0–0) WTA Tier II – IV (0–0) ITF Circuit (1–1)	Finals by surface Hard (0–1) Clay (1–0) Grass (0–0) Carpet (0–0)

Result	Date	Tournament	Surface	Opponent	Score
Win	8 September 1986	$10,000 Lisbon, Portugal	Clay	(Spain) María José Llorca	6–2, 6–2
Loss	26 January 1987	$25,000 Tarzana, California, United States	Hard	(Soviet Union) Leila Meskhi	6–1, 4–6, 2–6

=== Doubles: 11 (7–4) ===
Legend Grand Slam tournaments (0–0) WTA Tour Championships (0–0) WTA Tier I (0–0) WTA Tier II – IV (1–1) ITF Circuit (6–3)	Finals by surface Hard (4–2) Clay (1–0) Grass (0–0) Carpet (0–0)

Result	Date	Tournament	Surface	Partnering	Opponents	Score
Loss	20 January 1986	$10,000 San Antonio, Texas, United States	Hard	(South Africa) Dinky Van Rensburg	(Netherlands) Manon Bollegraf (Netherlands) Marianne van der Torre	5–7, 7–6^{(7–4)}, 4–6
Win	17 November 1986	$10,000 Croydon, Great Britain	Carpet (i)	(United Kingdom) Valda Lake	(Netherlands) Digna Ketelaar (Netherlands) Simone Schilder	7–6, 2–6, 7–5
Loss	27 April 1987	$25,000 Taranto, Italy	Clay	(Netherlands) Simone Schilder	(Soviet Union) Leila Meskhi (Soviet Union) Natasha Zvereva	3–6, 2–6
Loss	4 February 1991	Wellington, New Zealand (1)	Hard	(United Kingdom) Belinda Borneo	(Australia) Jo-Anne Faull (New Zealand) Julie Richardson	6–2, 5–7, 6–7^{(4–7)}
Win	3 February 1992	Wellington, New Zealand (2)	Hard	(United Kingdom) Belinda Borneo	(Australia) Jo-Anne Faull (New Zealand) Julie Richardson	6–0, 7–6^{(7–5)}
Win	17 July 1995	$25,000 Wilmington, Delaware, United States	Hard	(South Africa) Tessa Price	(Australia) Catherine Barclay (United States) Audra Keller	3–6, 6–1, 6–1
Win	26 February 1996	$50,000 Southampton, Great Britain	Carpet (i)	(United Kingdom) Valda Lake	(Italy) Laura Golarsa (Slovenia) Tina Križan	6–4, 4–6, 6–3
Win	12 August 1996	$25,000 Bronx, New York, United States	Hard	(Finland) Nanne Dahlman	(South Africa) Liezel Horn (Greece) Christína Papadáki	6–2, 6–3
Loss	17 February 1997	$25,000 Redbridge, Great Britain	Hard (i)	(Australia) Kerry-Anne Guse	(United Kingdom) Julie Pullin (United Kingdom) Lorna Woodroffe	6–2, 4–6, 4–6
Win	24 February 1997	$25,000 Bushey, Great Britain	Carpet (i)	(Ukraine) Olga Lugina	(Germany) Kirstin Freye (Ukraine) Elena Tatarkova	7–6^{(8–6)}, 6–7^{(6–8)}, 6–1
Win	16 March 1998	$10,000 Jaffa, Israel	Hard	(United Kingdom) Helen Reesby	(Israel) Limor Gabai (United Kingdom) Kate Warne-Holland	7–5, 7–5

== Grand Slam performance timelines ==
Key
W	F	SF	QF	#R	RR	Q#	DNQ	A	NH

(W) winner; (F) finalist; (SF) semifinalist; (QF) quarterfinalist; (#R) rounds 4, 3, 2, 1; (RR) round-robin stage; (Q#) qualification round; (DNQ) did not qualify; (A) absent; (NH) not held; (SR) strike rate (events won / competed); (W–L) win–loss record.

=== Singles ===
Tournament	1985	1986	1987	1988	1989	1990	1991	1992	1993	1994	1995	1996	1997	Career W–L
Australian Open	A	A	A	1R	1R	1R	3R	1R	1R	1R	LQ	1R	A	2–8
French Open	A	A	A	1R	LQ	LQ	1R	LQ	1R	2R	LQ	LQ	A	1–4
Wimbledon	1R	A	1R	1R	2R	1R	1R	1R	2R	1R	1R	1R	1R	2–12
U.S. Open	A	A	A	1R	LQ	2R	1R	2R	2R	1R	LQ	LQ	A	3–6
Win–loss	0–1	0–0	0–1	0–4	1–2	1-3	2-4	1-3	2-4	1–4	0-1	0-2	0–1	8-30

=== Doubles ===
Tournament	1987	1988	1989	1990	1991	1992	1993	1994	1995	1996	1997	1998	Career W–L
Australian Open	A	1R	1R	1R	2R	3R	2R	2R	1R	3R	2R	1R	8–11
French Open	A	A	1R	A	3R	3R	1R	1R	1R	2R	1R	A	5–8
Wimbledon	1R	1R	2R	1R	2R	1R	3R	1R	2R	1R	3R	A	7–11
US Open	A	A	1R	A	2R	2R	1R	1R	1R	1R	1R	A	2–8
Win–loss	0–1	0–2	1–4	0–2	5–4	5–4	3–4	1–4	1–4	3–4	3–4	0–1	22–38

=== Mixed doubles ===
Tournament	1989	1990	1991	1992	1993	1994	1995	1996	1997	Career W–L
Australian Open	A	A	A	1R	A	A	A	A	A	0–1
French Open	A	A	1R	3R	A	A	3R	A	1R	4–4
Wimbledon	1R	A	1R	1R	2R	1R	QF	1R	2R	5–8
US Open	A	A	A	A	A	A	A	A	A	0–0
Win–loss	0–1	0–0	0–2	2–3	1–1	0–1	5–2	0–1	1–2	9–13
