= Heidi Sprung =

Austrian tennis player

- Full name: Heidi Sprung Vasudevan
- Country (sports): Austria
- Born: 10 January 1969 (age 57)
- Prize money: $110,483

Singles
- Career titles: 0
- Highest ranking: No. 212 (14 October 1991)

Doubles
- Career titles: 3 ITF
- Highest ranking: No. 97 (17 July 1989)

Grand Slam doubles results
- Australian Open: 2R (1988, 1989, 1990)
- French Open: 2R (1989)
- Wimbledon: 2R (1989)

Team competitions
- Fed Cup: 2–1

Heidi Sprung Vasudevan (born 10 January 1969) is a former professional tennis player from Austria.

== Biography ==
Sprung, who is originally from Salzburg, played Fed Cup tennis for Austria in 1988. She teamed up with Judith Wiesner to win the deciding doubles rubber over Belgium, setting up a second round tie with the USSR. Against the USSR she beat world number 16 Larisa Savchenko in the singles, but this time lost the live doubles rubber.

On the WTA Tour she was most successful as a doubles player, with a career best ranking of 97. She was a doubles finalist at the 1989 Fernleaf Classic in Wellington.

Since retiring she has lived in Switzerland and is married to former India Davis Cup team representative Srinivasan Vasudevan. The pair run a tennis club in Zofingen.

== WTA Tour career finals ==
=== Doubles: 1 runner-up ===
Result	Date	Tournament	Category	Surface	Partner	Opponents	Score
Loss	Feb 1989	Wellington, New Zealand	Tier I	Hard	(Australia) Tracey Morton	(Australia) Elizabeth Smylie (Australia) Janine Tremelling	6–7^{(3)}, 1–6

== ITF finals ==
$25,000 tournaments
$10,000 tournaments

=== Singles (0–2) ===
Result	No.	Date	Tournament	Surface	Opponent	Score
Loss	1.	22 July 1991	Schwarzach, Austria	Clay	(Slovenia) Barbara Mulej	2–6, 1–6
Loss	2.	29 July 1991	Rheda-Wiedenbrück, Germany	Clay	(Romania) Florentina Curpene	3–6, 2–6

=== Doubles (3–5) ===
Result	No.	Date	Tournament	Surface	Partner	Opponents	Score
Loss	1.	4 August 1986	Kitzbühel, Austria	Clay	(Austria) Judith Wiesner	(Australia) Justine Brown (Australia) Louise Pleming	0–6, 0–6
Loss	2.	13 July 1987	Erlangen, West Germany	Clay	(Australia) Alison Scott	(Czechoslovakia) Denisa Krajčovičová (France) Virginie Paquet	1–6, 2–6
Win	3.	27 July 1987	Kitzbühel, Austria	Clay	(Austria) Judith Wiesner	(Austria) Bettina Diesner (Austria) Karin Oberleitner	6–3, 6–4
Win	4.	1 July 1991	Vaihingen, Germany	Clay	(United States) Lisa Seemann	(Germany) Henrike Kadzidroga (Uruguay) Patricia Miller	7–6, 6–1
Loss	5.	22 July 1991	Schwarzach, Austria	Clay	(Soviet Union) Agnese Blumberga	(Czechoslovakia) Karina Habšudová (Czechoslovakia) Katarína Studeníková	3–6, 1–6
Win	6.	31 May 1993	Cáceres, Spain	Hard	(United States) Eleni Rossides	(Israel) Tzipora Obziler (Israel) Limor Zaltz	0–6, 6–2, 6–2
Loss	7.	18 October 1993	Langenthal, Switzerland	Carpet (i)	(France) Anne De Gioanni	(Switzerland) Miroslava Vavrinec (Switzerland) Natalie Tschan	4–6, 6–4, 1–6
Loss	8.	10 April 1994	Limoges, France	Clay	(France) Angelique Olivier	(France) Isabelle Demongeot (Sweden) Maria Strandlund	2–6, 2–6
