= 1988 Wimbledon Championships – Boys' singles =

Boys' singles
- 1988 Wimbledon Championships

Final
- Champion: (Venezuela) Nicolás Pereira
- Runner-up: (France) Guillaume Raoux
- Score: 7–6^{(7–4)}, 6–2

Events
| Singles | men | women | | boys | girls |
| Doubles | men | women | mixed | boys | girls |
| WC Singles | men | women | quad |
| WC Doubles | men | women | quad |
| Legends | men | women | seniors |
- Wimbledon Championships

Nicolás Pereira defeated Guillaume Raoux in the final, 7–6^{(7–4)}, 6–2 to win the boys' singles tennis title at the 1988 Wimbledon Championships.

== Seeds ==
1. (Australia) Jason Stoltenberg (quarterfinals)
2. (Australia) Johan Anderson (first round)
3. (Soviet Union) Andrei Cherkasov (semifinals)
4. (Australia) Todd Woodbridge (second round)
5. (Socialist Federal Republic of Yugoslavia) Goran Ivanišević (quarterfinals)
6. (Venezuela) Nicolás Pereira (champion)
7. (Australia) Richard Fromberg (semifinals)
8. (India) Zeeshan Ali (second round)
9. (South Africa) Piet Norval (third round)
10. (Brazil) Roberto Jabali (second round)
11. n/a
12. (Argentina) Patricio Arnold (third round)
13. (France) Guillaume Raoux (final)
14. (Mexico) Luis Herrera (third round)
15. (Sweden) Nicklas Kulti (second round)
16. n/a

Click on the seed number of a player to go to their draw section.

== Draw ==
Key

- Q = Qualifier
- WC = Wild card
- LL = Lucky loser
- Alt = Alternate
- ITF = ITF entry
- PR = Protected ranking
- SR = Special ranking
- SE = Special exempt
- JE = Junior exempt
- JR = Junior Accelerator Programme entrant
- CO = College Accelerator Programme entrant
- NG = Next Gen Accelerator Program entrant
- w/o = Walkover
- r = Retired
- d = Defaulted

=== Finals ===
Quarterfinals
1 | (Australia) Jason Stoltenberg | 4 | 3
6 | (Venezuela) Nicolás Pereira | 6 | 6
(West Germany) Arne Thoms | 2 | 6 | 3
7 | (Australia) Richard Fromberg | 6 | 4 | 6
5 | (Socialist Federal Republic of Yugoslavia) Goran Ivanišević | 5 | 1^{r}
3 | (Soviet Union) Andrei Cherkasov | 7 | 2
(Sweden) Lars Jönsson | 7 | 1 | 4
13 | (France) Guillaume Raoux | 5 | 6 | 6

Semifinals
6 | (Venezuela) Nicolás Pereira | 4 | 7 | 6
(Australia) Richard Fromberg | 6 | 6 | 3
3 | (Soviet Union) Andrei Cherkasov | 3 | 7 | 5
13 | (France) Guillaume Raoux | 6 | 6 | 7

Final
6 | (Venezuela) Nicolás Pereira | 7^{7} | 6
13 | (France) Guillaume Raoux | 6^{4} | 2

=== Top half ===
==== Section 1 ====
First round
1 | (Australia) Jason Stoltenberg | 6 | 6
(Argentina) Martin Stringari | 4 | 4
(Chile) Rodrigo Gana | 6 | 4 | 3
(Argentina) Gustavo Carbonari | 4 | 6 | 6
(Brazil) Sergio Sarli | 5 | 6 | 6
(Belgium) Christophe Delzenne | 7 | 1 | 4
(Ghana) Frank Ofori | 2 | 4
12 | (Argentina) Patricio Arnold | 6 | 6
9 | (South Africa) Piet Norval | 6 | 6
(Ecuador) Andrés Alarcón | 1 | 3
(Philippines) Juancho Macaraeg | 4 | 0
(United Kingdom) Colin Beecher | 6 | 6
(Thailand) Narathorn Srichaphan | 4 | 1
(United Kingdom) Mark Petchey | 6 | 6
(South Africa) David Nainkin | 3 | 4
6 | (Venezuela) Nicolás Pereira | 6 | 6

Second round
1 | (Australia) J Stoltenberg | 6 | 6
(Argentina) G Carbonari | 4 | 1
(Brazil) S Sarli | 1 | 6 | 3
12 | (Argentina) P Arnold | 6 | 4 | 6
9 | (South Africa) P Norval | 6 | 6
(United Kingdom) C Beecher | 3 | 2
(United Kingdom) M Petchey | 7 | 3 | 4
6 | (Venezuela) N Pereira | 5 | 6 | 6

Third round
1 | (Australia) J Stoltenberg | 6 | 6
(Argentina) P Arnold | 1 | 1
9 | (South Africa) P Norval | 6^{2} | 4
6 | (Venezuela) N Pereira | 7^{7} | 6

Quarterfinals
1 | (Australia) J Stoltenberg | 4 | 3
6 | (Venezuela) N Pereira | 6 | 6

==== Section 2 ====
First round
4 | (Australia) Todd Woodbridge | 6 | 6
(South Korea) Park Chang-hee | 0 | 0
(West Germany) Arne Thoms | 6 | 6
(United States) Jared Palmer | 2 | 4
(Ecuador) Giorgio Carneade | 6 | 3 | 6
(United Kingdom) Ulli Nganga | 1 | 6 | 3
(Czechoslovakia) David Rikl | 4 | 1
15 | (Sweden) Nicklas Kulti | 6 | 6
(South Africa) David Adams | 6 | 6
(Pakistan) Usman Rahim | 4 | 4
(Italy) Cristian Brandi | 3 | 5
(Australia) John Marinov | 6 | 7
(Switzerland) Marc Rosset | 6 | 7
(India) Asif Ismail | 2 | 6
(Soviet Union) Vladimir Petrushenko | 6 | 5 | 3
7 | (Australia) Richard Fromberg | 4 | 7 | 6

Second round
4 | (Australia) T Woodbridge | 1 | 7 | 4
(West Germany) A Thoms | 6 | 6 | 6
(Ecuador) G Carneade | 6 | 6
15 | (Sweden) N Kulti | 2 | 2
(South Africa) D Adams | 5 | 2
(Australia) J Marinov | 7 | 6
(Switzerland) M Rosset | 2 | 6
7 | (Australia) R Fromberg | 6 | 7

Third round
(West Germany) A Thoms | 7 | 6
(Ecuador) G Carneade | 5 | 4
(Australia) J Marinov | 6 | 5 | 1
7 | (Australia) R Fromberg | 3 | 7 | 6

Quarterfinals
(West Germany) A Thoms | 2 | 6 | 3
7 | (Australia) R Fromberg | 6 | 4 | 6

=== Bottom half ===
==== Section 3 ====
First round
5 | (Socialist Federal Republic of Yugoslavia) Goran Ivanišević | 3 | 6 | 6
(United States) Martin Blackman | 6 | 3 | 2
(United Kingdom) Daniel Bishop | 3 | 0
(Hungary) Gábor Köves | 6 | 6
(Czechoslovakia) Tomáš Zdražila | 5 | 2
(United States) Jonathan Stark | 7 | 6
(Japan) Yasufumi Yamamoto | 3 | 6 | 3
(United Kingdom) James Lenton | 6 | 3 | 6
14 | (Mexico) Luis Herrera | 6 | 6
(South Korea) Kong Tae-hee | 3 | 2
(Italy) Cristiano Caratti | 6 | 6
(India) Rohit Rajpal | 0 | 2
(United Kingdom) Chris Wilkinson | 3 | 6 | 3
(United States) David DiLucia | 6 | 3 | 6
(Sweden) Magnus Larsson | 3 | 7 | 3
3 | (Soviet Union) Andrei Cherkasov | 6 | 6 | 6

Second round
5 | (Socialist Federal Republic of Yugoslavia) G Ivanišević | 6 | 6
(Hungary) G Köves | 3 | 2
(United States) J Stark | 6 | 6
(United Kingdom) J Lenton | 1 | 4
14 | (Mexico) L Herrera | 6 | 6
(Italy) C Caratti | 3 | 2
(United States) D DiLucia | 1 | 3
3 | (Soviet Union) A Cherkasov | 6 | 6

Third round
5 | (Socialist Federal Republic of Yugoslavia) G Ivanišević | 7^{7} | 7^{7}
(United States) J Stark | 6^{4} | 6^{3}
14 | (Mexico) L Herrera | 5 | 5
3 | (Soviet Union) A Cherkasov | 7 | 7

Quarterfinals
5 | (Socialist Federal Republic of Yugoslavia) G Ivanišević | 5 | 1^{r}
3 | (Soviet Union) A Cherkasov | 7 | 2

==== Section 4 ====
First round
8 | (India) Zeeshan Ali | 6 | 6 | 6
(Australia) Andrew Florent | 7 | 3 | 2
(Sweden) Lars Jönsson | 6 | 6
(New Zealand) Andrew Batie | 1 | 3
(South Korea) Shin Han-cheol | 6 | 4 | 6
(Brazil) Roberto Teofilo | 4 | 6 | 3
(United Kingdom) Jeffrey Hunter | 6 | 3 | 6
10 | (Brazil) Roberto Jabali | 3 | 6 | 8
13 | (France) Guillaume Raoux | 6 | 7
(Spain) Germán López | 3 | 5
(Indonesia) Benny Wijaya | 7 | 6
(South Korea) Shin Ji-hyeob | 6 | 3
(Colombia) Mauricio Hadad | 6 | 6
(South Africa) Emile Fourie | 2 | 4
(Poland) Lech Sidor | 6 | 4 | 2
2 | (Australia) Johan Anderson | 3 | 6 | 3^{r}

Second round
8 | (India) Z Ali | 3 | 4
(Sweden) L Jönsson | 6 | 6
(South Korea) H-c Shin | 6 | 6
10 | (Brazil) R Jabali | 4 | 2
13 | (France) G Raoux | 6 | 6
(Indonesia) B Wijaya | 0 | 3
(Colombia) M Hadad | 4 | 6 | 10
(Poland) L Sidor | 6 | 1 | 8

Third round
(Sweden) L Jönsson | 6 | 4 | 6
(South Korea) H-c Shin | 4 | 6 | 3
13 | (France) G Raoux | 7^{7} | 6
(Colombia) M Hadad | 6^{5} | 3

Quarterfinals
(Sweden) L Jönsson | 7 | 1 | 4
13 | (France) G Raoux | 5 | 6 | 6
