= 1988 Wimbledon Championships – Boys' doubles =

Boys' doubles
- 1988 Wimbledon Championships

Final
- Champions: (Australia) Jason Stoltenberg (Australia) Todd Woodbridge
- Runners-up: (Czechoslovakia) David Rikl (Czechoslovakia) Tomáš Zdražila
- Score: 6–4, 1–6, 7–5

Events
Singles	men	women		boys	girls
Doubles	men	women	mixed	boys	girls
WC Singles	men	women	quad
WC Doubles	men	women	quad
Legends	men	women	seniors
- Wimbledon Championships

Jason Stoltenberg and Todd Woodbridge successfully defended their title, defeating David Rikl and Tomáš Zdražila in the final, 6–4, 1–6, 7–5 to win the boys' doubles tennis title at the 1988 Wimbledon Championships.

== Seeds ==
1. (Australia) Jason Stoltenberg / (Australia) Todd Woodbridge (champions)
2. (India) Zeeshan Ali / (Socialist Federal Republic of Yugoslavia) Goran Ivanišević (first round)
3. (Soviet Union) Andrei Cherkasov / (Soviet Union) Vladimir Petrushenko (quarterfinals)
4. (Italy) Cristian Brandi / (Italy) Cristiano Caratti (semifinals)
5. (Czechoslovakia) David Rikl / (Czechoslovakia) Tomáš Zdražila (final)
6. (United Kingdom) Colin Beecher / (United Kingdom) Mark Petchey (quarterfinals)
7. (United States) Martin Blackman / (United States) Jared Palmer (second round)
8. (Australia) Johan Anderson / (Australia) Richard Fromberg (first round, withdrew)

== Draw ==
Key

- Q = Qualifier
- WC = Wild card
- LL = Lucky loser
- Alt = Alternate
- ITF = ITF entry
- PR = Protected ranking
- SR = Special ranking
- SE = Special exempt
- JE = Junior exempt
- JR = Junior Accelerator Programme entrant
- CO = College Accelerator Programme entrant
- NG = Next Gen Accelerator Program entrant
- w/o = Walkover
- r = Retired
- d = Defaulted

=== Finals ===
Semifinals
1	(Australia) Jason Stoltenberg (Australia) Todd Woodbridge	6	6^{6}	7
4	(Italy) Cristian Brandi (Italy) Cristiano Caratti	3	7^{8}	5
5	(Czechoslovakia) David Rikl (Czechoslovakia) Tomáš Zdražila	6	6
(United States) David DiLucia (United States) Jonathan Stark	4	3

Final
1	(Australia) Jason Stoltenberg (Australia) Todd Woodbridge	6	1	7
5	(Czechoslovakia) David Rikl (Czechoslovakia) Tomáš Zdražila	4	6	5

=== Top half ===
First round
1	(Australia) Jason Stoltenberg (Australia) Todd Woodbridge	6	6
(Pakistan) Usman Rahim (Japan) Yasufumi Yamamoto	0	2
(Switzerland) Marc Rosset (West Germany) Arne Thoms	6	6
(Sweden) Lars Jönsson (France) Guillaume Raoux	7	7
(India) Asif Ismail (Thailand) Narathorn Srichaphan	7	1	4
(Ecuador) Andrés Alarcón (Brazil) Roberto Jabali	6	6	6
(Australia) Andrew Florent (Australia) John Marinov	6	4	6
7	(United States) Martin Blackman (United States) Jared Palmer	3	6	8
4	(Italy) Cristian Brandi (Italy) Cristiano Caratti	6	6
(Chile) Rodrigo Gana (Chile) Felipe Rivera	3	2
(South Africa) Clayton Johnson (Spain) Germán López	3	4
(United Kingdom) Jeffrey Hunter (United Kingdom) Chris Wilkinson	6	6
(South Africa) David Nainkin (South Africa) Piet Norval	6	6
(Hungary) Gábor Köves (Poland) Lech Sidor	3	2
(Canada) Sébastien Leblanc (Canada) Greg Rusedski	4	2
6	(United Kingdom) Colin Beecher (United Kingdom) Mark Petchey	6	6

Second round
1	(Australia) J Stoltenberg (Australia) T Woodbridge	6	7^{7}
(Sweden) L Jönsson (France) G Raoux	2	6^{1}
(Ecuador) A Alarcón (Brazil) R Jabali	6	5	8
7	(United States) M Blackman (United States) J Palmer	4	7	6
3	(Italy) C Brandi (Italy) C Caratti	6	7
(United Kingdom) J Hunter (United Kingdom) C Wilkinson	2	5
(South Africa) D Nainkin (South Africa) P Norval	6^{3}	6	4
6	(United Kingdom) C Beecher (United Kingdom) M Petchey	7^{7}	0	6

Quarterfinals
1	(Australia) J Stoltenberg (Australia) T Woodbridge	6	6
(Ecuador) A Alarcón (Brazil) R Jabali	3	2
4	(Italy) C Brandi (Italy) C Caratti	2
6	(United Kingdom) C Beecher (United Kingdom) M Petchey	3^{r}

Semifinals
1	(Australia) J Stoltenberg (Australia) T Woodbridge	6	6^{6}	7
4	(Italy) C Brandi (Italy) C Caratti	3	7^{8}	5

=== Bottom half ===
First round
5	(Czechoslovakia) David Rikl (Czechoslovakia) Tomáš Zdražila	6	6
(South Korea) Park Chang-hee (South Korea) Shin Han-cheol	4	2
(Ecuador) Giorgio Carneade (Argentina) Martin Stringari	6	2
(New Zealand) Andrew Batie (India) Rohit Rajpal	7	6
(Philippines) Juancho Macaraeg (Indonesia) Benny Wijaya	3	4
(United Kingdom) Daniel Gold (United Kingdom) David Ireland	6	6
(United Kingdom) James Lenton (United Kingdom) Ulli Nganga	6	5
3	(Soviet Union) Andrei Cherkasov (Soviet Union) Vladimir Petrushenko	7	6
8	(Australia) Johan Anderson (Australia) Richard Fromberg	w/o
(Brazil) Roberto Teofilo (Brazil) Sergio Sarli
(United States) David DiLucia (United States) Jonathan Stark	6	3	6
(Colombia) Mauricio Hadad (Mexico) Luis Herrera	3	6	3
(South Africa) David Adams (South Africa) Emile Fourie	6	6
(South Korea) Kong Tae-hee (South Korea) Shin Ji-hyeob	3	2
(Sweden) Nicklas Kulti (Sweden) Magnus Larsson	7	2	7
2	(India) Zeeshan Ali (Socialist Federal Republic of Yugoslavia) Goran Ivanišević	6	6	7^{r}

Second round
5	(Czechoslovakia) D Rikl (Czechoslovakia) T Zdražila	6	6
(New Zealand) A Batie (India) R Rajpal	4	4
(United Kingdom) D Gold (United Kingdom) D Ireland	2	3
3	(Soviet Union) A Cherkasov (Soviet Union) V Petrushenko	6	6
(Brazil) R Teofilo (Brazil) S Sarli	3	2
(United States) D DiLucia (United States) J Stark	6	6
(South Africa) D Adams (South Africa) E Fourie	4	7	11
(Sweden) N Kulti (Sweden) M Larsson	6	5	13

Quarterfinals
5	(Czechoslovakia) D Rikl (Czechoslovakia) T Zdražila	6	2	6
3	(Soviet Union) A Cherkasov (Soviet Union) V Petrushenko	3	6	4
(United States) D DiLucia (United States) J Stark	7	4	6
(Sweden) N Kulti (Sweden) M Larsson	5	6	2

Semifinals
5	(Czechoslovakia) D Rikl (Czechoslovakia) T Zdražila	6	6
(United States) D DiLucia (United States) J Stark	4	3
