= 1988 Wimbledon Championships – Girls' singles =

Girls' singles
- 1988 Wimbledon Championships

Final
- Champion: (Netherlands) Brenda Schultz
- Runner-up: (France) Emmanuelle Derly
- Score: 7–6^{(7–5)}, 6–1

Events
Singles	men	women		boys	girls
Doubles	men	women	mixed	boys	girls
WC Singles	men	women	quad
WC Doubles	men	women	quad
Legends	men	women	seniors
← 1987 ·	Wimbledon Championships	· 1989 →

Brenda Schultz defeated Emmanuelle Derly in the final, 7–6^{(7–5)}, 6–1 to win the girls' singles tennis title at the 1988 Wimbledon Championships.

== Seeds ==
1. (Netherlands) Brenda Schultz (champion)
2. (Czechoslovakia) Radka Zrubáková (first round)
3. (France) Julie Halard (quarterfinals)
4. (France) Alexia Dechaume (quarterfinals)
5. (United States) Amy Frazier (semifinals)
6. (Italy) Laura Lapi (first round)
7. (France) Emmanuelle Derly (final)
8. (Czechoslovakia) Jana Pospíšilová (semifinals)
9. (Italy) Cathy Caverzasio (second round)
10. (West Germany) Veronika Martinek (first round)
11. (Belgium) Sabine Appelmans (second round)
12. (Australia) Jo-Anne Faull (third round)
13. (Australia) Rachel McQuillan (third round)
14. (United Kingdom) Sarah Loosemore (first round)
15. (West Germany) Silke Frankl (second round)
16. (Soviet Union) Natalia Medvedeva (quarterfinals)

Click on the seed number of a player to go to their draw section.

== Draw ==
=== Key ===
- Q = Qualifier
- WC = Wild card
- LL = Lucky loser
- Alt = Alternate
- SE = Special exempt
- PR = Protected ranking
- ITF = ITF entry
- JE = Junior exempt
- w/o = Walkover
- r = Retired
- d = Defaulted
- SR = Special ranking

=== Finals ===
Quarterfinals
1	(Netherlands) Brenda Schultz	6	6
(France) Maïder Laval	2	2
4	(France) Alexia Dechaume	5	6
5	(United States) Amy Frazier	7	7
8	(Czechoslovakia) Jana Pospíšilová	6	6
3	(France) Julie Halard	4	3
7	(France) Emmanuelle Derly	6	6
16	(Soviet Union) Natalia Medvedeva	1	4

Semifinals
1	(Netherlands) Brenda Schultz	6	6	6
5	(United States) Amy Frazier	7	4	2
8	(Czechoslovakia) Jana Pospíšilová	3	3
7	(France) Emmanuelle Derly	6	6

Final
1	(Netherlands) Brenda Schultz	7^{7}	6
7	(France) Emmanuelle Derly	6^{5}	1

=== Top half ===
==== Section 1 ====
First round
1	(Netherlands) Brenda Schultz	6	6
(Argentina) Jorgelina Moreno	0	2
(Poland) Sylwia Czopek	2	5
(Israel) Yael Segal	6	7
(Argentina) Cristina Tessi	3	6
(United States) Ann Grossman	6	7
(United Kingdom) Alison Hill	3	3
11	(Belgium) Sabine Appelmans	6	6
14	(United Kingdom) Sarah Loosemore	6	6
(Spain) Alejandra Casas	0	2
(Japan) Kimiko Date	0	6	6
(Thailand) Orawan Thampensri	6	2	4
(Algeria) Ouarda Bouchabou	7	6
(Uruguay) Claudia Brause	5	3
(France) Maïder Laval	7	6
6	(Italy) Laura Lapi	5	3

Second round
1	(Netherlands) B Schultz	6	6
(Israel) Y Segal	1	3
(United States) A Grossman	3	6	6
11	(Belgium) S Appelmans	6	4	2
14	(United Kingdom) S Loosemore	2	4
(Japan) K Date	6	6
(Algeria) O Bouchabou	5	1
(France) M Laval	7	6

Third round
1	(Netherlands) B Schultz	6^{5}	7	8
(United States) A Grossman	7^{7}	5	6
(Japan) K Date	1	4
(France) M Laval	6	6

Quarterfinals
1	(Netherlands) B Schultz	6	6
(France) M Laval	2	2

==== Section 2 ====
First round
4	(France) Alexia Dechaume	6	6
(United Kingdom) Andrea Chorlton	1	0
(United Kingdom) Virginia Humphreys-Davies	1	4
(United States) Andrea Farley	6	6
(New Zealand) Claudine Toleafoa	2	6	10
(Finland) Nanne Dahlman	6	3	8
(Brazil) Alessandra Kaul	7	6
10	(West Germany) Veronika Martinek	5	2
9	(Italy) Cathy Caverzasio	6	6	6
(Peru) Paloma Collantes	2	7	2
(South Korea) Choi Bong-soon	5	3
(South Africa) Amanda Coetzer	7	6
(United States) Meredith McGrath	6	6
(United Kingdom) Sam Smith	3	1
(United Kingdom) Alexandra Niepel	5	4
5	(United States) Amy Frazier	7	6

Second round
4	(France) A Dechaume	6	6
(United States) A Farley	4	4
(New Zealand) C Toleafoa	6	7
(Brazil) A Kaul	4	5
9	(Italy) C Caverzasio	5	4
(South Africa) A Coetzer	7	6
(United States) M McGrath	6	2	9
5	(United States) A Frazier	3	6	11

Third round
4	(France) A Dechaume	6	6
(New Zealand) C Toleafoa	1	0
(South Africa) A Coetzer	6	2	3
5	(United States) A Frazier	0	6	6

Quarterfinals
4	(France) A Dechaume	5	6
5	(United States) A Frazier	7	7

=== Bottom half ===
==== Section 3 ====
First round
8	(Czechoslovakia) Jana Pospíšilová	6	6
(West Germany) Maja Živec-Škulj	0	3
(Poland) Magdalena Mróz	7	6
(Switzerland) Gabrielle Villiger	5	3
(Australia) Kristine Radford	6	6
(Indonesia) Dewi-Fortunasari Wibisono	2	1
(United Kingdom) Nicola Topper	1	4
13	(Australia) Rachel McQuillan	6	6
12	(Australia) Jo-Anne Faull	6	7
(Australia) Michelle Bowrey	2	5
(China) Li Fang	6	2
(Venezuela) Elizabeth Nieto	7	6
(United Kingdom) Lindsey Nimmo	6	0
(Sweden) Maria Ekstrand	7	6
(South Africa) Rikki Gaddie	4	6
3	(France) Julie Halard	6	7

Second round
8	(Czechoslovakia) J Pospíšilová	6	6
(Poland) M Mróz	2	2
(Australia) K Radford	6	6	6
13	(Australia) R McQuillan	2	7	8
12	(Australia) J-A Faull	6	6
(Venezuela) E Nieto	2	1
(Sweden) M Ekstrand	6	4
3	(France) J Halard	7	6

Third round
8	(Czechoslovakia) J Pospíšilová	6	7	7
13	(Australia) R McQuillan	7	6	1
12	(Australia) J-A Faull	1	4
3	(France) J Halard	6	6

Quarterfinals
8	(Czechoslovakia) J Pospíšilová	6	6
3	(France) J Halard	4	3

==== Section 4 ====
First round
7	(France) Emmanuelle Derly	7	6
(United States) Luanne Spadea	5	4
(Japan) Rika Hiraki	6	6
(Soviet Union) Natalia Biletskaia	3	2
(Canada) Laura Randmaa	2	1
(Canada) Maureen Drake	6	6
(Zimbabwe) Julia Muir	1	1
15	(West Germany) Silke Frankl	6	6
16	(Soviet Union) Natalia Medvedeva	6	6
(Canada) Suzanne Italiano	2	2
(Argentina) Florencia Labat	2	6
(United States) Debbie Graham	6	7
(Japan) Shiho Okada	5	6	2
(Chinese Taipei) Wang Shi-ting	1	7	6
(Japan) Naoko Sawamatsu	6	6
2	(Czechoslovakia) Radka Zrubáková	2	4

Second round
7	(France) E Derly	3	6	6
(Japan) R Hiraki	6	2	4
(Canada) M Drake	7	6
15	(West Germany) S Frankl	5	3
16	(Soviet Union) N Medvedeva	6	6
(United States) D Graham	2	3
(Chinese Taipei) S-t Wang	2	4
(Japan) N Sawamatsu	6	6

Third round
7	(France) E Derly	4	6	7
(Canada) M Drake	6	2	5
16	(Soviet Union) N Medvedeva	6	6
(Japan) N Sawamatsu	3	2

Quarterfinals
7	(France) E Derly	6	6
16	(Soviet Union) N Medvedeva	1	4
