= 1988 Wimbledon Championships – Girls' doubles =

Girls' doubles
- 1988 Wimbledon Championships

Final
- Champions: (Australia) Jo-Anne Faull (Australia) Rachel McQuillan
- Runners-up: (France) Alexia Dechaume (France) Emmanuelle Derly
- Score: 4–6, 6–2, 6–3

Events
Singles	men	women		boys	girls
Doubles	men	women	mixed	boys	girls
WC Singles	men	women	quad
WC Doubles	men	women	quad
Legends	men	women	seniors
← 1987 ·	Wimbledon Championships	· 1989 →

Natalia Medvedeva and Natasha Zvereva were the defending champions, but Zvereva did not compete. Medvedeva played with Natalia Biletskaia but lost in the quarterfinals to Amy Frazier and Luanne Spadea.

Jo-Anne Faull and Rachel McQuillan defeated Alexia Dechaume and Emmanuelle Derly in the final, 4–6, 6–2, 6–3 to win the girls' doubles tennis title at the 1988 Wimbledon Championships.

== Seeds ==
The top 4 seeds received a bye into the second round.

1. (France) Alexia Dechaume / (France) Emmanuelle Derly (final)
2. (Australia) Jo-Anne Faull / (Australia) Rachel McQuillan (champions)
3. (Czechoslovakia) Jana Pospíšilová / (Czechoslovakia) Radka Zrubáková (quarterfinals)
4. (United States) Amy Frazier / (United States) Luanne Spadea (semifinals)
5. (United States) Ann Grossman / (United States) Meredith McGrath (semifinals)
6. (Australia) Michelle Bowrey / (Australia) Kristine Radford (quarterfinals)
7. (France) Julie Halard / (France) Maïder Laval (quarterfinals)
8. (Soviet Union) Natalia Biletskaia / (Soviet Union) Natalia Medvedeva (quarterfinals)

== Draw ==
=== Key ===
- Q = Qualifier
- WC = Wild card
- LL = Lucky loser
- Alt = Alternate
- SE = Special exempt
- PR = Protected ranking
- ITF = ITF entry
- JE = Junior exempt
- w/o = Walkover
- r = Retired
- d = Defaulted
- SR = Special ranking

=== Finals ===
Semifinals
1	(France) Alexia Dechaume (France) Emmanuelle Derly	6	6
4	(United States) Amy Frazier (United States) Luanne Spadea	3	2
5	(United States) Ann Grossman (United States) Meredith McGrath	6	6^{3}	1
2	(Australia) Jo-Anne Faull (Australia) Rachel McQuillan	3	7^{7}	6

Final
1	(France) Alexia Dechaume (France) Emmanuelle Derly	6	2	3
2	(Australia) Jo-Anne Faull (Australia) Rachel McQuillan	4	6	6

=== Top half ===
First round
(Japan) Kimiko Date (Japan) Shiho Okada	7	0	2
(Finland) Nanne Dahlman (Argentina) Cristina Tessi	6	6	6
(Canada) Suzanne Italiano (Canada) Laura Randmaa	7	6
(Japan) Rika Hiraki (Chinese Taipei) Wang Shi-ting	6	3
(Poland) Sylwia Czopek (Poland) Magdalena Mróz	6	2
6	(Australia) Michelle Bowrey (Australia) Kristine Radford	7	6
(Spain) Alejandra Casas (Switzerland) Gabrielle Villiger	6	3	3
(United Kingdom) Alison Hill (Israel) Yael Segal	1	6	6
(Argentina) Florencia Labat (New Zealand) Claudine Toleafoa	6	6
(Algeria) Ouarda Bouchabou (Zimbabwe) Julia Muir	2	2
(United Kingdom) Andrea Chorlton (Canada) Maureen Drake	2	1
8	(Soviet Union) Natalia Biletskaia (Soviet Union) Natalia Medvedeva	6	6

Second round
1	(France) Alexia Dechaume (France) Emmanuelle Derly	6	4	6
(Finland) N Dahlman (Argentina) C Tessi	3	6	3
(Canada) S Italiano (Canada) L Randmaa	0	2
6	(Australia) M Bowrey (Australia) K Radford	6	6
4	(United States) Amy Frazier (United States) Luanne Spadea
(United Kingdom) A Hill (Israel) Y Segal	w/o
(Argentina) F Labat (New Zealand) C Toleafoa	3	0
8	(Soviet Union) N Biletskaia (Soviet Union) N Medvedeva	6	6

Quarterfinals
1	(France) A Dechaume (France) E Derly	6^{5}	6	6
(Australia) M Bowrey (Australia) K Radford	7^{7}	4	4
4	(United States) A Frazier (United States) L Spadea	6	6
8	(Soviet Union) N Biletskaia (Soviet Union) N Medvedeva	2	1

Semifinals
1	(France) A Dechaume (France) E Derly	6	6
4	(United States) A Frazier (United States) L Spadea	3	2

=== Bottom half ===
First round
5	(United States) Ann Grossman (United States) Meredith McGrath	6	6
(China) Li Fang (Japan) Naoko Sawamatsu	4	4
(United Kingdom) Sam Smith (United Kingdom) Nicola Topper	6	2	6
(Uruguay) Claudia Brause (Brazil) Alessandra Kaul	4	6	4
(Peru) Paloma Collantes (Thailand) Orawan Thampensri	3	0
(United States) Andrea Farley (United States) Debbie Graham	6	6
7	(France) Julie Halard (France) Maïder Laval	6	6
(Argentina) Jorgelina Moreno (Venezuela) Elizabeth Nieto	2	2
(West Germany) Veronika Martinek (West Germany) Maja Živec-Škulj	7^{7}	4	11
(United Kingdom) Virginia Humphreys-Davies (United Kingdom) Sarah Loosemore	6^{4}	6	13
(South Africa) Amanda Coetzer (South Africa) Rikki Gaddie	6	6
(South Korea) Choi Bong-soon (Indonesia) Dewi-Fortunasari Wibisono	1	2

Second round
5	(United States) A Grossman (United States) M McGrath	7	6
(United Kingdom) S Smith (United Kingdom) N Topper	5	3
(United States) A Farley (United States) D Graham	6^{5}	2
3	(Czechoslovakia) Jana Pospíšilová (Czechoslovakia) Radka Zrubáková	7^{7}	6
7	(France) J Halard (France) M Laval	6	6
(United Kingdom) V Humphreys-Davies (United Kingdom) S Loosemore	1	2
(South Africa) A Coetzer (South Africa) R Gaddie	6	2	5
2	(Australia) Jo-Anne Faull (Australia) Rachel McQuillan	2	6	7

Quarterfinals
5	(United States) A Grossman (United States) M McGrath	6	6
3	(Czechoslovakia) J Pospíšilová (Czechoslovakia) R Zrubáková	1	3
7	(France) J Halard (France) M Laval	6	6^{5}	3
2	(Australia) J-A Faull (Australia) R McQuillan	3	7^{7}	6

Semifinals
5	(United States) A Grossman (United States) M McGrath	6	6^{3}	1
2	(Australia) J-A Faull (Australia) R McQuillan	3	7^{7}	6
