= 1984 Livingston Open =

- Date: July 30 – August 6
- Edition: 1st
- Category: Grand Prix
- Draw: 32S / 16D
- Prize money: $75,000
- Surface: Hard / outdoor
- Location: Livingston, New Jersey, U.S.
- Venue: Newark Academy

Champions

Singles
- (United States) Johan Kriek

Doubles
- (United States) Scott Davis / (United States) Ben Testerman
Livingston Open	· 1985 →

The 1984 Livingston Open was a men's tennis tournament played on outdoor hard courts that was part of the 1984 Volvo Grand Prix. It was played at Newark Academy in Livingston, New Jersey in the United States from July 30 through August 6, 1984. First-seeded Johan Kriek won the singles title.

== Finals ==
=== Singles ===
(United States) Johan Kriek defeated (West Germany) Michael Westphal 6–2, 6–4

- It was Kriek's 2nd singles title of the year and the 12th of his career.

=== Doubles ===
(United States) Scott Davis / (United States) Ben Testerman defeated (United States) Paul Annacone / (Canada) Glenn Michibata 6–4, 6–4

- It was Davis' only title of the year and the 3rd of his career. It was Testerman's only title of the year and the 1st of his career.
