= 1984 Livingston Open – Singles =

Singles
- 1984 Livingston Open

Final
- Champion: (United States) Johan Kriek
- Runner-up: (West Germany) Michael Westphal
- Score: 6–2, 6–4

Details
- Draw: 32
- Seeds: 8

Events
| Singles | Doubles |
| Livingston Open | · 1985 → |

This was the first edition of the event.

Johan Kriek won the title, defeating Michael Westphal 6–2, 6–4 in the final.

== Seeds ==
1. (United States) Johan Kriek (champion)
2. (United States) Gene Mayer (second round)
3. (United States) Scott Davis (second round)
4. (United States) Peter Fleming (first round)
5. (United States) Leif Shiras (quarterfinals)
6. (United States) Brad Gilbert (first round)
7. (United States) Tim Gullikson (first round)
8. (United States) Ben Testerman (first round)

== Draw ==
=== Key ===
- Q = Qualifier
- WC = Wild card
- LL = Lucky loser
- Alt = Alternate
- SE = Special exempt
- PR = Protected ranking
- ITF = ITF entry
- JE = Junior exempt
- w/o = Walkover
- r = Retired
- d = Defaulted
- SR = Special ranking

=== Finals ===
Semifinals
1 | (United States) Johan Kriek | 6 | 4 | 6
(United States) Sammy Giammalva Jr. | 3 | 6 | 3
(West Germany) Michael Westphal | 6 | 6
(United States) Vincent Van Patten | 0 | 1

Final
1 | (United States) Johan Kriek | 6 | 6
(West Germany) Michael Westphal | 2 | 4

=== Top half ===
First round
1 | (United States) J Kriek | 7 | 7
(United States) T Moor | 5 | 6
(United States) T Giammalva | 6 | 6
(United States) To Gullikson | 4 | 4
Q | (United States) G Núñez | 4 | 2
(United States) G Holmes | 6 | 6
(Canada) G Michibata | 2 | 7 | 4
5 | (United States) L Shiras | 6 | 6 | 6
3 | (United States) S Davis | 7 | 7
(Australia) J Alexander | 6 | 6
Q | (United States) B Green | 6 | 1
(United States) R Tanner | 2 | 0^{r}
WC | (United States) Dan Nahirny | 1 | 2
(United Kingdom) J Lloyd | 6 | 6
(United States) S Giammalva Jr. | 7 | 6
8 | (United States) B Testerman | 5 | 4

Second round
1 | (United States) J Kriek | 6 | 4 | 6
(United States) T Giammalva | 2 | 6 | 3
(United States) G Holmes | 1 | 4
5 | (United States) L Shiras | 6 | 6
3 | (United States) S Davis | 7 | 4 | 1
Q | (United States) B Green | 6 | 6 | 6
(United Kingdom) J Lloyd | 2 | 0
(United States) S Giammalva Jr. | 6 | 6

Quarterfinals
1 | (United States) J Kriek | 7 | 7
5 | (United States) L Shiras | 6 | 6
Q | (United States) B Green | 4 | 7 | 4
(United States) S Giammalva Jr. | 6 | 5 | 6

Semifinals
1 | (United States) J Kriek | 6 | 4 | 6
(United States) S Giammalva Jr. | 3 | 6 | 3

=== Bottom half ===
First round
7 | (United States) Ti Gullikson | 6 | 3
(West Germany) M Westphal | 7 | 6
(United States) M Mitchell | 4 | 3
Q | (United States) G Layendecker | 6 | 6
(United States) F Buehning | 7 | 6
(United States) R Van't Hof | 5 | 4
Q | (United States) M De Palmer | 3 | 7 | 6
4 | (United States) P Fleming | 6 | 6 | 1
6 | (United States) B Gilbert | 5 | 3
WC | (United States) D Cassidy | 7 | 6
WC | (United States) P Annacone | 4 | 3
(United States) L Stefanki | 6 | 6
(United States) V Van Patten | 6 | 7
(United States) M Doyle | 1 | 5
(United States) T Nelson | 6 | 5 | 2
2 | (United States) G Mayer | 2 | 7 | 6

Second round
(West Germany) M Westphal | 6 | 6
Q | (United States) G Layendecker | 3 | 2
(United States) F Buehning | 3 | 6
Q | (United States) M De Palmer | 6 | 7
WC | (United States) D Cassidy | 6 | 6
(United States) L Stefanki | 4 | 4
(United States) V Van Patten | 6 | 6
2 | (United States) G Mayer | 3 | 2

Quarterfinals
(West Germany) M Westphal | 6 | 7
Q | (United States) M De Palmer | 4 | 6
WC | (United States) D Cassidy | 4 | 6 | 3
(United States) V Van Patten | 6 | 2 | 6

Semifinals
(West Germany) M Westphal | 6 | 6
(United States) V Van Patten | 0 | 1
