= 1984 Livingston Open – Doubles =

Doubles
- 1984 Livingston Open

Final
- Champions: (United States) Scott Davis (United States) Ben Testerman
- Runners-up: (United States) Paul Annacone (Canada) Glenn Michibata

Details
- Draw: 16
- Seeds: 4

Events
Singles	Doubles
- Livingston Open

This was the first edition of the event.

Scott Davis and Ben Testerman won the title, defeating Paul Annacone and Glenn Michibata 6–4, 6–4 in the final.

== Seeds ==
1. (United States) Fritz Buehning / (United States) Peter Fleming (first round)
2. (Australia) John Alexander / (United States) Johan Kriek (semifinals)
3. (United States) Larry Stefanki / (United States) Robert Van't Hof (first round)
4. (United States) Tony Giammalva / (United Kingdom) John Lloyd (first round)

== Draw ==
Key

- Q = Qualifier
- WC = Wild card
- LL = Lucky loser
- Alt = Alternate
- ITF = ITF entry
- PR = Protected ranking
- SR = Special ranking
- SE = Special exempt
- JE = Junior exempt
- JR = Junior Accelerator Programme entrant
- CO = College Accelerator Programme entrant
- NG = Next Gen Accelerator Program entrant
- w/o = Walkover
- r = Retired
- d = Defaulted

=== Draw ===
First round
1	(United States) F Buehning (United States) P Fleming	3	6
(United States) M De Palmer (United States) J Turpin	6	7
(United States) B Green (United States) G Layendecker	6	6
(United States) B Gilbert (United States) V Van Patten	4	3
3	(United States) L Stefanki (United States) R Van't Hof	6	3
(United States) P Annacone (Canada) G Michibata	7	6
(United States) S Giammalva Jr. (United States) H Sands	2	6	6
(United States) M Mitchell (United States) L Shiras	6	0	4
(United States) J Klaparda (United States) M Kures	2	7	6
(United States) M Doyle (Australia) J McCurdy	6	5	7
(United States) S Davis (United States) B Testerman	6	6
4	(United States) T Giammalva (United Kingdom) J Lloyd	3	4
(United States) R Crowley (United States) R Evett	6	3
(United States) G Núñez (United States) A Scheinman	7	6
(United States) R Meyer (United States) T Moor	3	3
2	(Australia) J Alexander (United States) J Kriek	6	6

Quarterfinals
(United States) M De Palmer (United States) J Turpin	6	7	6
(United States) B Green (United States) G Layendecker	7	5	3
(United States) P Annacone (Canada) G Michibata	2	6	6
(United States) S Giammalva Jr. (United States) H Sands	6	3	3
(United States) M Doyle (Australia) J McCurdy	4	3
(United States) S Davis (United States) B Testerman	6	6
(United States) G Núñez (United States) A Scheinman	2	1
2	(Australia) J Alexander (United States) J Kriek	6	6

Semifinals
(United States) M De Palmer (United States) J Turpin	7	4	6
(United States) P Annacone (Canada) G Michibata	6	6	7
(United States) S Davis (United States) B Testerman	3	6	7
2	(Australia) J Alexander (United States) J Kriek	6	3	6

Final
(United States) P Annacone (Canada) G Michibata	4	4
(United States) S Davis (United States) B Testerman	6	6
