= 1988 Wimbledon Championships =

- Date: 20 June – 4 July
- Edition: 102nd
- Category: Grand Slam
- Draw: 128S/64D/64XD
- Prize money: £2,612,126
- Surface: Grass
- Location: Church Road; SW19, Wimbledon, London, United Kingdom
- Venue: All England Lawn Tennis and Croquet Club

Champions

Men's singles
- (Sweden) Stefan Edberg

Women's singles
- (West Germany) Steffi Graf

Men's doubles
- (United States) Ken Flach / (United States) Robert Seguso

Women's doubles
- (West Germany) Steffi Graf / (Argentina) Gabriela Sabatini

Mixed doubles
- (United States) Sherwood Stewart / (United States) Zina Garrison

Boys' singles
- (Venezuela) Nicolás Pereira

Girls' singles
- (Netherlands) Brenda Schultz

Boys' doubles
- (Australia) Jason Stoltenberg / (Australia) Todd Woodbridge

Girls' doubles
- (Australia) Jo-Anne Faull / (Australia) Rachel McQuillan
← 1987 ·	Wimbledon Championships	· 1989 →

The 1988 Wimbledon Championships was a tennis tournament played on grass courts at the All England Lawn Tennis and Croquet Club in Wimbledon, London in the United Kingdom. It was the 102nd edition of the Wimbledon Championships and were held from 20 June to 4 July 1988. Due to rain interruptions on Sunday 3 July, the men's final finished on 4 July.

== Prize money ==
The total prize money for 1988 championships was £2,612,126. The winner of the men's title earned £165,000 while the women's singles champion earned £148,500.

Event	W	F	SF	QF	Round of 16	Round of 32	Round of 64	Round of 128
Men's singles	£165,000	£82,500	£41,250	£20,900	£11,000	£6,160	£3,630	£2,215
Women's singles	£148,500	£74,250	£36,090	£17,765	£8,800	£4,775	£2,815	£1,715
Men's doubles *	£57,200	£28,600	£14,300	£7,260	£3,740	£1,980	£1,160	—
Women's doubles *	£49,500	£24,750	£11,430	£5,810	£2,800	£1,490	£850	—
Mixed doubles *	£29,700	£14,850	£7,430	£3,450	£1,720	£860	£390	—

_{* per team}

== Champions ==
=== Seniors ===
==== Men's singles ====
(Sweden) Stefan Edberg defeated (West Germany) Boris Becker, 4–6, 7–6^{(7–2)}, 6–4, 6–2

- It was Edberg's 3rd career Grand Slam title and his 1st Wimbledon title.

==== Women's singles ====
(West Germany) Steffi Graf defeated (United States) Martina Navratilova, 5–7, 6–2, 6–1

- It was Graf's 4th career Grand Slam title and her 1st Wimbledon title.

==== Men's doubles ====
(United States) Ken Flach / (United States) Robert Seguso defeated (Australia) John Fitzgerald / (Sweden) Anders Järryd, 6–4, 2–6, 6–4, 7–6^{(7–3)}

- It was Flach's 5th career Grand Slam title and his 3rd and last Wimbledon title. It was Seguso's 4th and last career Grand Slam title and his 2nd Wimbledon title.

==== Women's doubles ====
(West Germany) Steffi Graf / (Argentina) Gabriela Sabatini defeated (Soviet Union) Larisa Savchenko / (Soviet Union) Natasha Zvereva, 6–3, 1–6, 12–10

- It was Graf's 5th career Grand Slam title and her 2nd Wimbledon title. It was Sabatini's 1st career Grand Slam title and her only Wimbledon title.

==== Mixed doubles ====
(United States) Sherwood Stewart / (United States) Zina Garrison defeated (United States) Kelly Jones / (United States) Gretchen Magers, 6–1, 7–6^{(7–3)}

- It was Stewart's 5th and last career Grand Slam title and his only Wimbledon title. It was Garrison's 2nd career Grand Slam title and her 1st Wimbledon title.

=== Juniors ===
==== Boys' singles ====
(Venezuela) Nicolás Pereira defeated (France) Guillaume Raoux, 7–6^{(7–4)}, 6–2

==== Girls' singles ====
(Netherlands) Brenda Schultz defeated (France) Emmanuelle Derly, 7–6^{(7–5)}, 6–1

==== Boys' doubles ====
(Australia) Jason Stoltenberg / (Australia) Todd Woodbridge defeated (Czechoslovakia) David Rikl / (Czechoslovakia) Tomáš Zdražila, 6–4, 1–6, 7–5

==== Girls' doubles ====
(Australia) Jo-Anne Faull / (Australia) Rachel McQuillan defeated (France) Alexia Dechaume / (France) Emmanuelle Derly, 4–6, 6–2, 6–3

== Singles seeds ==
=== Men's singles ===
1. (Czechoslovakia) Ivan Lendl (semifinals, lost to Boris Becker)
2. (Sweden) Mats Wilander (quarterfinals, lost to Miloslav Mečíř)
3. (Sweden) Stefan Edberg (champion)
4. (Australia) Pat Cash (quarterfinals, lost to Boris Becker)
5. (United States) Jimmy Connors (fourth round, lost to Patrik Kühnen)
6. (West Germany) Boris Becker (final, lost to Stefan Edberg)
7. (France) Henri Leconte (fourth round, lost to Tim Mayotte)
8. (United States) John McEnroe (second round, lost to Wally Masur)
9. (Czechoslovakia) Miloslav Mečíř (semifinals, lost to Stefan Edberg)
10. (United States) Tim Mayotte (quarterfinals, lost to Ivan Lendl)
11. (Sweden) Anders Järryd (second round, lost to Jim Grabb)
12. (Sweden) Jonas Svensson (third round, lost to Paul Annacone)
13. (Spain) Emilio Sánchez (second round, lost to Petr Korda)
14. (Soviet Union) Andrei Chesnokov (first round, lost to Udo Riglewski)
15. (Israel) Amos Mansdorf (second round, lost to Diego Nargiso)
16. (Socialist Federal Republic of Yugoslavia) Slobodan Živojinović (fourth round, lost to Mats Wilander)

=== Women's singles ===
1. (West Germany) Steffi Graf (champion)
2. (United States) Martina Navratilova (final, lost to Steffi Graf)
3. (United States) Pam Shriver (semifinals, lost to Steffi Graf)
4. (United States) Chris Evert (semifinals, lost to Martina Navratilova)
5. (Argentina) Gabriela Sabatini (fourth round, lost to Zina Garrison)
6. (Czechoslovakia) Helena Suková (quarterfinals, lost to Chris Evert)
7. (Bulgaria) Manuela Maleeva-Fragnière (first round, lost to Pascale Paradis)
8. (Soviet Union) Natasha Zvereva (fourth round, lost to Rosalyn Fairbank)
9. (Australia) Hana Mandlíková (third round, lost to Anne Minter)
10. (United States) Lori McNeil (third round, lost to Rosalyn Fairbank)
11. (West Germany) Claudia Kohde-Kilsch (withdrew before the tournament began)
12. (United States) Zina Garrison (quarterfinals, lost to Pam Shriver)
13. (Soviet Union) Larisa Savchenko (fourth round, lost to Martina Navratilova)
14. (Bulgaria) Katerina Maleeva (fourth round, lost to Pam Shriver)
15. (West Germany) Sylvia Hanika (third round, lost to Katrina Adams)
16. (United States) Mary Joe Fernández (fourth round, lost to Steffi Graf)

Preceded by 1988 French Open	Grand Slams	Succeeded by 1988 US Open
