= 1988 Wimbledon Championships – Men's singles =

Men's singles
- 1988 Wimbledon Championships

Final
- Champion: (Sweden) Stefan Edberg
- Runner-up: (West Germany) Boris Becker
- Score: 4–6, 7–6^{(7–2)}, 6–4, 6–2

Details
- Draw: 128 (16Q / 8WC)
- Seeds: 16

Events
Singles	men	women		boys	girls
Doubles	men	women	mixed	boys	girls
WC Singles	men	women	quad
WC Doubles	men	women	quad
Legends	men	women	seniors
- Wimbledon Championships

Stefan Edberg defeated Boris Becker in the final, 4–6, 7–6^{(7–2)}, 6–4, 6–2 to win the gentlemen's singles tennis title at the 1988 Wimbledon Championships. It was his first Wimbledon singles title and third major singles title overall. Most of the final was played on the third Monday. On Sunday, Becker and Edberg only managed 22 minutes of constantly interrupted play due to rain, with Edberg leading 3–2 in the first set before the rest of the final was played the next day. This marked the first of three consecutive Wimbledon finals between Edberg and Becker.

Pat Cash was the defending champion, but lost in the quarterfinals to Becker.

Three-time champion John McEnroe competed for the first time since 1985, losing in the second round to Wally Masur. This tournament also featured the first appearance of future champion Goran Ivanišević.

== Seeds ==
1. (Czechoslovakia) Ivan Lendl (semifinals)
2. (Sweden) Mats Wilander (quarterfinals)
3. (Sweden) Stefan Edberg (champion)
4. (Australia) Pat Cash (quarterfinals)
5. (United States) Jimmy Connors (fourth round)
6. (West Germany) Boris Becker (final)
7. (France) Henri Leconte (fourth round)
8. (United States) John McEnroe (second round)
9. (Czechoslovakia) Miloslav Mečíř (semifinals)
10. (United States) Tim Mayotte (quarterfinals)
11. (Sweden) Anders Järryd (second round)
12. (Sweden) Jonas Svensson (third round)
13. (Spain) Emilio Sánchez (second round)
14. (Soviet Union) Andrei Chesnokov (first round)
15. (Israel) Amos Mansdorf (second round)
16. (Socialist Federal Republic of Yugoslavia) Slobodan Živojinović (fourth round)

Click on the seed number of a player to go to their draw section.

== Draw ==
Key

- Q = Qualifier
- WC = Wild card
- LL = Lucky loser
- Alt = Alternate
- ITF = ITF entry
- PR = Protected ranking
- SR = Special ranking
- SE = Special exempt
- JE = Junior exempt
- JR = Junior Accelerator Programme entrant
- CO = College Accelerator Programme entrant
- NG = Next Gen Accelerator Program entrant
- w/o = Walkover
- r = Retired
- d = Defaulted

=== Finals ===
Quarterfinals
1	(Czechoslovakia) Ivan Lendl	7	7	6
10	(United States) Tim Mayotte	6	6	3
4	(Australia) Pat Cash	4	3	4
6	(West Germany) Boris Becker	6	6	6
(West Germany) Patrik Kühnen	3	6	1	6
3	(Sweden) Stefan Edberg	6	4	6	7
9	(Czechoslovakia) Miloslav Mečíř	6	6	6
2	(Sweden) Mats Wilander	3	1	3

Semifinals
1	(Czechoslovakia) Ivan Lendl	4	3	7^{10}	4
6	(West Germany) Boris Becker	6	6	6^{8}	6
3	(Sweden) Stefan Edberg	4	2	6	6	6
9	(Czechoslovakia) Miloslav Mečíř	6	6	4	3	4

Final
6	(West Germany) Boris Becker	6	6^{2}	4	2
3	(Sweden) Stefan Edberg	4	7^{7}	6	6

=== Top half ===
==== Section 1 ====
First round
1	(Czechoslovakia) Ivan Lendl	6	6	6
WC	(United Kingdom) David Felgate	4	1	3
(South Africa) Gary Muller	7	2	2	0
(Australia) Darren Cahill	6	6	6	6
(Sweden) Peter Lundgren	4	4	6	7	6
(Sweden) Niclas Kroon	6	6	4	6	0
(Austria) Alex Antonitsch	6	4	4	6
(Netherlands) Michiel Schapers	4	6	6	7
(Canada) Grant Connell	2	4	7	6	5
(India) Ramesh Krishnan	6	6	5	1	7
(United States) Johan Kriek	6	3	4
(Australia) Mark Woodforde	7	6	6
Q	(Italy) Diego Nargiso	6	6	7
WC	(United Kingdom) Jason Goodall	2	3	6
Q	(Socialist Federal Republic of Yugoslavia) Goran Ivanišević	3	2	6	1
15	(Israel) Amos Mansdorf	6	6	1	6

Second round
1	(Czechoslovakia) I Lendl	5	6	6	6
(Australia) D Cahill	7	2	4	4
(Sweden) P Lundgren	5	2	2
(Netherlands) M Schapers	7	6	6
(India) R Krishnan	7	4	3	3
(Australia) M Woodforde	6	6	6	6
Q	(Italy) D Nargiso	6	3
15	(Israel) A Mansdorf	3	0^{r}

Third round
1	(Czechoslovakia) I Lendl	6	7	6	6	6
(Netherlands) M Schapers	7	6	4	7	1
(Australia) M Woodforde	6	6	6
Q	(Italy) D Nargiso	3	4	3

Fourth round
1	(Czechoslovakia) I Lendl	7	6^{8}	6^{4}	7	10
(Australia) M Woodforde	5	7^{10}	7^{7}	5	8

==== Section 2 ====
First round
10	(United States) Tim Mayotte	6	6	6
(United States) Matt Anger	4	4	3
(United States) Greg Holmes	6	3	6	6
WC	(United Kingdom) Nick Fulwood	3	6	1	3
(Sweden) Joakim Nyström	2	6	6	6
(United States) Jim Pugh	6	4	4	3
(Sweden) Jan Gunnarsson	6	7	6
WC	(United Kingdom) Chris Bailey	3	6	4
Q	(South Africa) Barry Moir	6	6	4	6
(Spain) Sergio Casal	2	3	6	1
WC	(United Kingdom) Mark Petchey	3	5	4
Q	(West Germany) Heiner Moraing	6	7	6
Q	(United States) Glenn Layendecker	5	6	4	2
(United States) Michael Chang	7	1	6	6
Q	(Sweden) Tobias Svantesson	4	2	2
7	(France) Henri Leconte	6	6	6

Second round
10	(United States) T Mayotte	6	6	6
(United States) G Holmes	3	3	4
(Sweden) J Nyström	6	3	6	6	6
(Sweden) J Gunnarsson	4	6	3	7	1
Q	(South Africa) B Moir	7	6	4	6
Q	(West Germany) H Moraing	6	3	6	3
(United States) M Chang	6	6	2	3
7	(France) H Leconte	2	7	6	6

Third round
10	(United States) T Mayotte	6	4	6	6
(Sweden) J Nyström	4	6	2	4
Q	(South Africa) B Moir	6	1	6	1
7	(France) H Leconte	3	6	7	6

Fourth round
10	(United States) T Mayotte	6	7^{7}	4	6
7	(France) H Leconte	4	6^{5}	6	2

==== Section 3 ====
First round
4	(Australia) Pat Cash	6	6	6
Q	(Australia) Todd Woodbridge	1	1	2
(Argentina) Javier Frana	4	3	6	6	6
Q	(United States) Bill Scanlon	6	6	3	3	2
(Italy) Francesco Cancellotti	3	6	1	4
(Australia) John Fitzgerald	6	3	6	6
(Czechoslovakia) Libor Pimek	1	4	1
(Sweden) Christian Bergström	6	6	6
Q	(Soviet Union) Andrei Olhovskiy	6	6	6
(Czechoslovakia) Tomáš Šmid	4	4	4
(South Africa) Pieter Aldrich	6	6	6	4	6
(Peru) Pablo Arraya	7	4	4	6	2
(Canada) Chris Pridham	6	6	6
Q	(South Africa) Gustav Fichardt	3	4	4
(West Germany) Udo Riglewski	7	6	6
14	(Soviet Union) Andrei Chesnokov	5	4	4

Second round
4	(Australia) P Cash	6	4	3	6	6
(Argentina) J Frana	2	6	6	1	4
(Australia) J Fitzgerald	6	4	7	6
(Sweden) C Bergström	4	6	5	3
Q	(Soviet Union) A Olhovskiy	6	6	6
(South Africa) P Aldrich	4	4	2
(Canada) C Pridham	6	7	6	7
(West Germany) U Riglewski	7	5	3	5

Third round
4	(Australia) P Cash	6	6	6
(Australia) J Fitzgerald	1	2	4
Q	(Soviet Union) A Olhovskiy	3	6	6	6
(Canada) C Pridham	6	3	4	3

Fourth round
4	(Australia) P Cash	6	6	6
Q	(Soviet Union) A Olhovskiy	3	3	3

==== Section 4 ====
First round
12	(Sweden) Jonas Svensson	6	7	6
(United States) Tim Wilkison	1	6	3
(France) Tarik Benhabiles	3	4	4
(Sweden) Magnus Gustafsson	6	6	6
(Czechoslovakia) Branislav Stankovič	6	2	6	6
(United States) Todd Nelson	3	6	3	4
(United States) Paul Annacone	6	6	6
LL	(Canada) Martin Laurendeau	0	2	3
(United States) Sammy Giammalva Jr.	6	6	6	4	6
(West Germany) Ricki Osterthun	7	2	1	6	4
(Czechoslovakia) Milan Šrejber	6	7	4	6
LL	(Nigeria) Nduka Odizor	3	6	6	3
(Czechoslovakia) Karel Nováček	6	6	7
(Sweden) Peter Lindgren	2	4	6
(Australia) John Frawley	3	1	2
6	(West Germany) Boris Becker	6	6	6

Second round
12	(Sweden) J Svensson	6	6	6
(Sweden) M Gustafsson	1	2	4
(Czechoslovakia) B Stankovič	4	2	4
(United States) P Annacone	6	6	6
(United States) S Giammalva	1	6	6	1	6
(Czechoslovakia) M Šrejber	6	1	2	6	3
(Czechoslovakia) K Nováček	3	4	4
6	(West Germany) B Becker	6	6	6

Third round
12	(Sweden) J Svensson	4	2	6	4
(United States) P Annacone	6	6	3	6
(United States) S Giammalva	6	4	4
6	(West Germany) B Becker	7	6	6

Fourth round
(United States) P Annacone	3	4	4
6	(West Germany) B Becker	6	6	6

=== Bottom half ===
==== Section 5 ====
First round
5	(United States) Jimmy Connors	6	7	6
(United States) Leif Shiras	3	6	1
Q	(Australia) Jason Stoltenberg	6	6	6
(Senegal) Yahiya Doumbia	4	4	3
(Peru) Jaime Yzaga	0	3	5
(United States) Derrick Rostagno	6	6	7
(United States) Martin Davis	5	7	7	7
(Australia) Broderick Dyke	7	5	6	5
(United States) Dan Goldie	3	6	4	5
(Switzerland) Jakob Hlasek	6	4	6	7
(West Germany) Patrik Kühnen	6	6	6
Q	(Netherlands) Huub van Boeckel	3	2	4
(United States) Jim Grabb	6	6	6
(Czechoslovakia) Josef Čihák	0	3	4
(Netherlands) Tom Nijssen	2	0	2
11	(Sweden) Anders Järryd	6	6	6

Second round
5	(United States) J Connors	7	6	6
Q	(Australia) J Stoltenberg	6	3	3
(United States) D Rostagno	6	6	6	4	16
(United States) M Davis	2	3	7	6	14
(Switzerland) J Hlasek	6	7	6	1	4
(West Germany) P Kühnen	7	5	4	6	6
(United States) J Grabb	3	7	6	6
11	(Sweden) A Järryd	6	6	3	0

Third round
5	(United States) J Connors	7	4	4	6	7
(United States) D Rostagno	5	6	6	2	5
(West Germany) P Kühnen	6	6	6
(United States) J Grabb	1	4	4

Fourth round
5	(United States) J Connors	7	6^{7}	6^{2}	7^{7}	3
(West Germany) P Kühnen	5	7^{9}	7^{7}	6^{4}	6

==== Section 6 ====
First round
13	(Spain) Emilio Sánchez	6	6	6
(Spain) Javier Sánchez	3	3	4
(Italy) Massimiliano Narducci	3	6	3	2
(Czechoslovakia) Petr Korda	6	3	6	6
(Czechoslovakia) Jaroslav Navrátil	4	4	3
WC	(United Kingdom) Stephen Botfield	6	6	6
(West Germany) Carl-Uwe Steeb	6	3	6	2	4
(Australia) Simon Youl	2	6	4	6	6
(Australia) Peter Doohan	5	6	3
(United States) Ken Flach	7	7	6
(United States) Jay Berger	6	7	6
(Spain) Fernando Luna	1	6	0
(West Germany) Christian Saceanu	5	6	3	5
(United States) Richey Reneberg	7	2	6	7
(France) Guy Forget	4	6	3	4
3	(Sweden) Stefan Edberg	6	3	6	6

Second round
13	(Spain) E Sánchez	6	3	6	6	1
(Czechoslovakia) P Korda	7	6	3	0	6
WC	(United Kingdom) S Botfield	2	3	4
(Australia) S Youl	6	6	6
(United States) K Flach	7	6	6
(United States) J Berger	5	1	4
(United States) R Reneberg	3	6	7	2
3	(Sweden) S Edberg	6	7	5	6

Third round
(Czechoslovakia) P Korda	4	6	0
(Australia) S Youl	6	7	6
(United States) K Flach	2	5	6	5
3	(Sweden) S Edberg	6	7	2	7

Fourth round
(Australia) S Youl	2	4	4
3	(Sweden) S Edberg	6	6	6

==== Section 7 ====
First round
8	(United States) John McEnroe	6	7	6
(Austria) Horst Skoff	1	5	1
WC	(United Kingdom) Steve Shaw	3	6	6	1
(Australia) Wally Masur	6	7	4	6
(United Kingdom) Jeremy Bates	2	1	6	7	6
(South Africa) Christo van Rensburg	6	6	3	5	4
(United States) Robert Seguso	6	6	6	6
Q	(Australia) Shane Barr	2	7	4	3
(United States) David Pate	6	6	6	6
(Sweden) Ulf Stenlund	2	3	7	2
(United States) Kevin Curren	6	7	6	4
Q	(Chile) Ricardo Acuña	7	6	7	6
(Soviet Union) Alexander Volkov	4	7	3	6	7
(France) Thierry Champion	6	6	6	4	5
(Mexico) Agustín Moreno	6	6	2
9	(Czechoslovakia) Miloslav Mečíř	7	7	6

Second round
8	(United States) J McEnroe	5	6	3
(Australia) W Masur	7	7	6
(United Kingdom) J Bates	7	3	2	4
(United States) R Seguso	6	6	6	6
(United States) D Pate	6	7	6	6	4
Q	(Chile) R Acuña	3	5	7	7	6
(Soviet Union) A Volkov	2	4	4
9	(Czechoslovakia) M Mečíř	6	6	6

Third round
(Australia) W Masur	6	6	6	6
(United States) R Seguso	4	4	7	1
Q	(Chile) R Acuña	3	4	2
9	(Czechoslovakia) M Mečíř	6	6	6

Fourth round
(Australia) W Masur	6	2	4	2
9	(Czechoslovakia) M Mečíř	4	6	6	6

==== Section 8 ====
First round
16	(Socialist Federal Republic of Yugoslavia) Slobodan Živojinović	5	7	6	6
(Argentina) Horacio de la Peña	7	6	4	4
(United States) John Ross	6	6	6	3	6
(Italy) Paolo Canè	7	2	1	6	1
WC	(United Kingdom) Richard Whichello	7	6	5	2
(West Germany) Tore Meinecke	5	7	7	6
(West Germany) Eric Jelen	6	3	6	6
(Israel) Gilad Bloom	3	6	4	3
(New Zealand) Kelly Evernden	7	6	6
(France) Jérôme Potier	6	4	2
(Netherlands) Menno Oosting	7	6	6
Q	(Australia) Carl Limberger	5	1	3
(United Kingdom) Andrew Castle	4	5	4
Q	(Canada) Glenn Michibata	6	7	6
(Belgium) Eduardo Masso	3	4	6
2	(Sweden) Mats Wilander	6	6	7

Second round
16	(Socialist Federal Republic of Yugoslavia) S Živojinović	6	6	6
(United States) J Ross	4	4	4
(West Germany) T Meinecke	1	1	4
(West Germany) E Jelen	6	6	6
(New Zealand) K Evernden	6	6	4	6	1
(Netherlands) M Oosting	4	7	6	3	6
Q	(Canada) G Michibata	2	6	4
2	(Sweden) M Wilander	6	7	6

Third round
16	(Socialist Federal Republic of Yugoslavia) S Živojinović	3	6	7	6
(West Germany) E Jelen	6	3	6	3
(Netherlands) M Oosting	1	4	4
2	(Sweden) M Wilander	6	6	6

Fourth round
16	(Socialist Federal Republic of Yugoslavia) S Živojinović	4	6^{1}	5
2	(Sweden) M Wilander	6	7^{7}	7

Preceded by 1988 French Open	Grand Slams; Men's Singles	Succeeded by 1988 US Open
