= Hugo Núñez =

Ecuadorian tennis player

- Country (sports): Ecuador
- Born: 14 April 1961 (age 63); Guayaquil, Ecuador
- Height: 5 ft 7 in (170 cm)
- Plays: Right-handed
- Prize money: $25,970

Singles
- Career record: 1–4
- Highest ranking: No. 222 (12 December 1988)

Doubles
- Career record: 0–9
- Highest ranking: No. 226 (12 June 1989)

Hugo Núñez (born 14 April 1961) is an Ecuadorian former professional tennis player.

== Biography ==
Núñez grew up in both Ecuador and the United States. He was born in Guayaquil and went to high school in New Jersey, then attended Southern Illinois University Edwardsville (SIUE). In 1980, he teamed up with Juan Farrow to win the NCAA Men's Division II doubles championship, having lost to Farrow in the singles championship final.

A right-handed player, Núñez reached a best singles ranking on the professional tour of 222 in the world. His best performance on the Grand Prix circuit was a second round appearance at the 1988 Livingston Open. He won three ATP Challenger doubles titles during his career.

Between 1987 and 1992 he featured in a total of seven Davis Cup ties for Ecuador.

== Challenger titles ==
=== Doubles: (3) ===
No.	Date	Tournament	Surface	Partner	Opponents	Score
1.	21 September 1981	Layetano, Spain	Clay	(Ecuador) Gonzalo Núñez	(South Africa) Rory Chappell (United States) John Van Nostrand	6–4, 7–5
2.	11 September 1988	Nyon, Switzerland	Clay	(Ecuador) Raúl Viver	(Sweden) Jan Apell (Finland) Veli Paloheimo	2–6, 6–4, 6–1
3.	6 November 1988	Bossonnens, Switzerland	Hard	(Czechoslovakia) Branislav Stankovič	(United States) Bret Garnett (United States) Bill Scanlon	6–4, 7–6

== See also ==
- List of Ecuador Davis Cup team representatives
