= List of Ecuador Davis Cup team representatives =

This is a list of tennis players who have represented the Ecuador Davis Cup team in an official Davis Cup match. Ecuador have taken part in the competition since 1961.

== Players ==
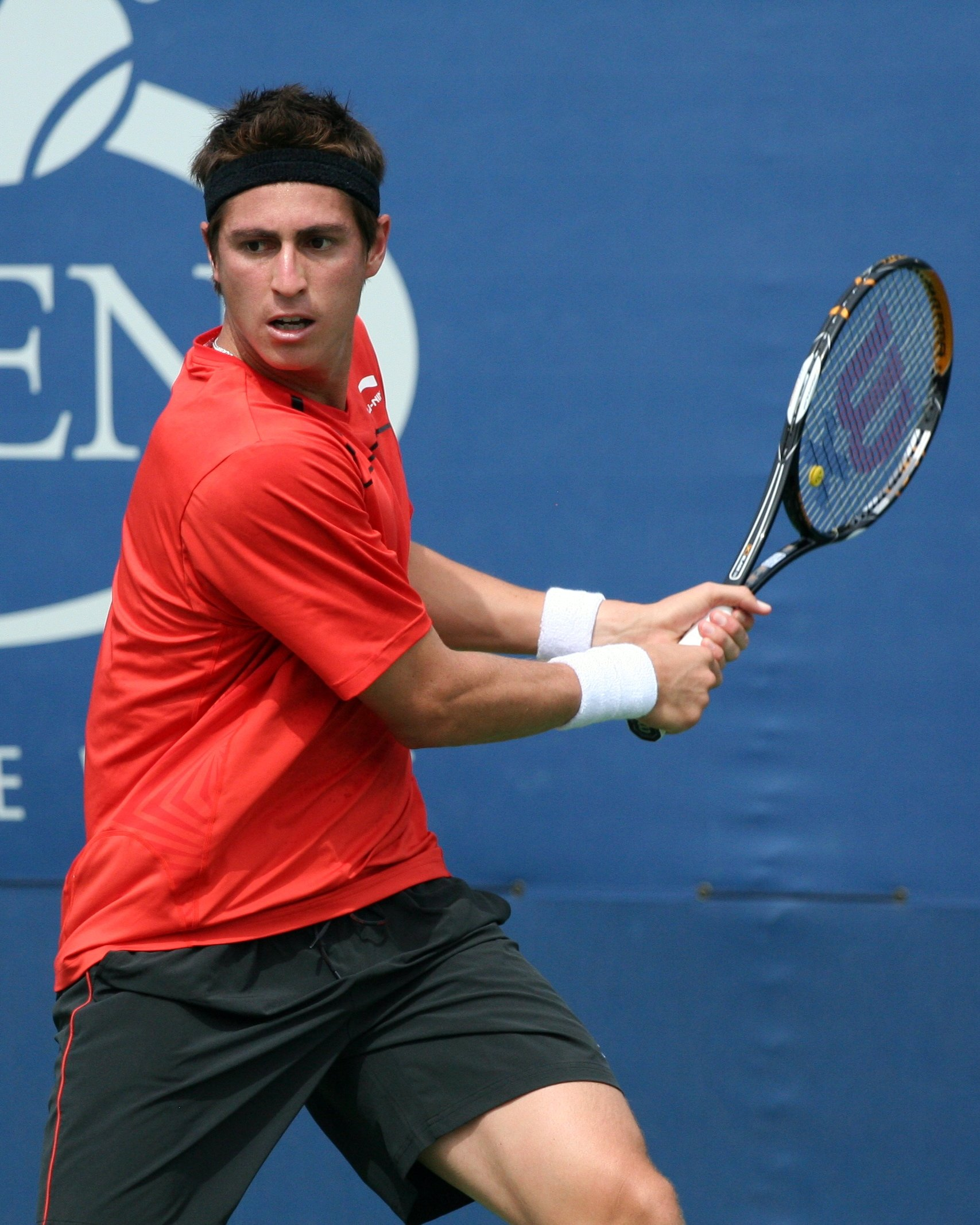
Giovanni Lapentti

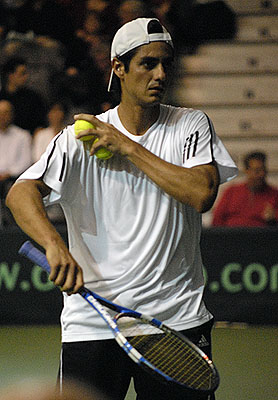
Nicolás Lapentti

| Player | W-L (Total) | W-L (Singles) | W-L (Doubles) | Ties | Debut |
|---|---|---|---|---|---|
| Martín Aguirre | 0–3 | 0–2 | 0–1 | 2 | 1983 |
| Andrés Alarcón | 1–3 | 1–1 | 0–2 | 3 | 1989 |
| Patricio Alvarado | 0–1 | 0–1 | 0–0 | 1 | 2007 |
| Enrique Andrade | 0–2 | 0–2 | 0–0 | 1 | 1974 |
| Carlos Avellán | 15–12 | 9–8 | 6–4 | 16 | 2002 |
| Juan Francisco Barragán | 0–1 | 0–1 | 0–0 | 1 | 1999 |
| Pablo Campana | 18–6 | 11–4 | 7–2 | 14 | 1990 |
| Julio César Campozano | 9–14 | 8–10 | 1–4 | 14 | 2006 |
| Giorgio Carneade | 2–8 | 1–5 | 1–3 | 5 | 1989 |
| Jhonny de León | 3–2 | 2–2 | 1–0 | 4 | 2002 |
| Jean-Michel Durango | 1–2 | 1–1 | 0–1 | 2 | 2007 |
| Iván Endara | 4–7 | 3–6 | 1–1 | 8 | 2008 |
| Andrés Gómez | 51–27 | 31–12 | 20–15 | 37 | 1979 |
| Juan Andrés Gómez | 1–1 | 1–1 | 0–0 | 2 | 2006 |
| Emilio Gómez | 0–2 | 0–1 | 0–1 | 2 | 2010 |
| Pancho Guzmán | 13–24 | 8–15 | 5–9 | 14 | 1963 |
| Diego Hidalgo | 0–2 | 0–1 | 0–1 | 1 | 2012 |
| Nicolás Lapentti | 61–34 | 41–16 | 20–18 | 38 | 1993 |
| Giovanni Lapentti | 18–26 | 11–17 | 7–9 | 23 | 1998 |
| Ernesto Lingen | 1–7 | 1–5 | 0–2 | 5 | 1988 |
| Luis Morejón | 19–21 | 16–21 | 3–0 | 23 | 1991 |
| Hugo Núñez | 6–8 | 1–6 | 5–2 | 7 | 1987 |
| Colón Núñez | 1–4 | 0–3 | 1–1 | 2 | 1977 |
| Gonzalo Núñez | 0–2 | 0–2 | 0–0 | 1 | 1976 |
| Miguel Olvera | 21–29 | 14–18 | 7–11 | 19 | 1961 |
| Ricardo Pazmiño | 0–2 | 0–2 | 0–0 | 1 | 1978 |
| Roberto Quiroz | 0–2 | 0–0 | 0–2 | 2 | 2011 |
| Martin Stiegwardt | 1–0 | 1–0 | 0–0 | 1 | 2002 |
| Juan Sebastián Vivanco | 0–1 | 0–1 | 0–0 | 1 | 2011 |
| Raúl Viver | 15–13 | 14–11 | 1–2 | 18 | 1979 |
| Ricardo Ycaza | 28–20 | 17–12 | 11–8 | 21 | 1973 |
| Eduardo Zuleta | 6–6 | 5–3 | 1–3 | 4 | 1961 |
| José Zunino | 0–2 | 0–2 | 0–0 | 2 | 2006 |
