= 1988 Wimbledon Championships – Women's doubles =

Women's doubles
- 1988 Wimbledon Championships

Final
- Champions: (West Germany) Steffi Graf (Argentina) Gabriela Sabatini
- Runners-up: (Soviet Union) Larisa Savchenko (Soviet Union) Natasha Zvereva
- Score: 6–3, 1–6, 12–10

Details
- Draw: 64 (4 Q / 4 WC )
- Seeds: 16

Events
Singles	men	women		boys	girls
Doubles	men	women	mixed	boys	girls
WC Singles	men	women	quad
WC Doubles	men	women	quad
Legends	men	women	seniors
← 1987 ·	Wimbledon Championships	· 1989 →

Steffi Graf and Gabriela Sabatini defeated Larisa Savchenko and Natasha Zvereva in the final, 6–3, 1–6, 12–10 to win the ladies' doubles tennis title at the 1988 Wimbledon Championships. It was the first and only major doubles title for both.

Claudia Kohde-Kilsch and Helena Suková were the defending champions but did not compete.

== Seeds ==
1. (United States) Martina Navratilova / (United States) Pam Shriver (third round)
2. n/a
3. (West Germany) Steffi Graf / (Argentina) Gabriela Sabatini (champions)
4. (United States) Lori McNeil / (United States) Betsy Nagelsen (quarterfinals)
5. (Czechoslovakia) Jana Novotná / (France) Catherine Suire (third round)
6. (West Germany) Eva Pfaff / (Australia) Elizabeth Smylie (quarterfinals)
7. (United States) Elise Burgin / (United States) Robin White (first round)
8. (United States) Katrina Adams / (United States) Zina Garrison (semifinals)
9. (South Africa) Rosalyn Fairbank / (Puerto Rico) Gigi Fernández (quarterfinals)
10. (Soviet Union) Leila Meskhi / (Soviet Union) Svetlana Parkhomenko (second round)
11. (Soviet Union) Larisa Savchenko / (Soviet Union) Natasha Zvereva (final)
12. (Australia) Hana Mandlíková / (United States) Barbara Potter (second round)
13. (United States) Chris Evert / (Australia) Wendy Turnbull (semifinals)
14. (United Kingdom) Jo Durie / (United States) Sharon Walsh-Pete (third round)
15. (Sweden) Catarina Lindqvist / (Denmark) Tine Scheuer-Larsen (third round)
16. (France) Isabelle Demongeot / (France) Nathalie Tauziat (third round)
17. (Netherlands) Manon Bollegraf / (Australia) Nicole Provis (third round)

Click on the seed number of a player to go to their draw section.

== Draw ==
=== Key ===
- Q = Qualifier
- WC = Wild card
- LL = Lucky loser
- Alt = Alternate
- SE = Special exempt
- PR = Protected ranking
- ITF = ITF entry
- JE = Junior exempt
- w/o = Walkover
- r = Retired
- d = Defaulted
- SR = Special ranking

=== Finals ===
Quarterfinals
11	(Soviet Union) Larisa Savchenko (Soviet Union) Natasha Zvereva	6	6
9	(South Africa) Rosalyn Fairbank (Puerto Rico) Gigi Fernández	4	2
4	(United States) Lori McNeil (United States) Betsy Nagelsen	4	3
8	(United States) Katrina Adams (United States) Zina Garrison	6	6
(Sweden) Maria Lindström (West Germany) Claudia Porwik	6	5	2
13	(United States) Chris Evert (Australia) Wendy Turnbull	3	7	6
6	(West Germany) Eva Pfaff (Australia) Elizabeth Smylie	6	7	6
3	(West Germany) Steffi Graf (Argentina) Gabriela Sabatini	7	5	8

Semifinals
11	(Soviet Union) Larisa Savchenko (Soviet Union) Natasha Zvereva	6	6
8	(United States) Katrina Adams (United States) Zina Garrison	3	3
13	(United States) Chris Evert (Australia) Wendy Turnbull	3	4
3	(West Germany) Steffi Graf (Argentina) Gabriela Sabatini	6	6

Final
11	(Soviet Union) Larisa Savchenko (Soviet Union) Natasha Zvereva	3	6	10
3	(West Germany) Steffi Graf (Argentina) Gabriela Sabatini	6	1	12

=== Top half ===
==== Section 1 ====
First round
1	(United States) M Navratilova (United States) P Shriver	6	6
(South Africa) L Gregory (United States) R Reis	2	2
(United States) J Goodling (United States) C Jones	6	4
(Australia) J Byrne (Australia) J Thompson	7	6
(Australia) D Balestrat (Bulgaria) M Maleeva	1	4
(United States) L Antonoplis (United States) B Gerken	6	6
Q	(Japan) Y Koizumi (United States) K Steinmetz	1	4
11	(Soviet Union) L Savchenko (Soviet Union) N Zvereva	6	6
15	(Sweden) C Lindqvist (Denmark) T Scheuer-Larsen	7	6
(New Zealand) B Cordwell (United States) M Van Nostrand	5	3
(United States) C Reynolds (United States) P Smith	6	6
(Brazil) G Miró (Argentina) A Villagrán	2	4
(West Germany) W Probst (Spain) A Sánchez Vicario	3	6
(Netherlands) I Driehuis (Netherlands) M Mesker	6	7
LL	(Australia) L O'Neill (United States) J Smoller	3	6	2
9	(South Africa) R Fairbank (Puerto Rico) G Fernández	6	3	6

Second round
1	(United States) M Navratilova (United States) P Shriver	6	3	7
(Australia) J Byrne (Australia) J Thompson	4	6	5
(United States) L Antonoplis (United States) B Gerken	2	1
11	(Soviet Union) L Savchenko (Soviet Union) N Zvereva	6	6
15	(Sweden) C Lindqvist (Denmark) T Scheuer-Larsen	6	4	6
(United States) C Reynolds (United States) P Smith	4	6	2
(Netherlands) I Driehuis (Netherlands) M Mesker	2	3
9	(South Africa) R Fairbank (Puerto Rico) G Fernández	6	6

Third round
1	(United States) M Navratilova (United States) P Shriver	6	2
11	(Soviet Union) L Savchenko (Soviet Union) N Zvereva	7	6
15	(Sweden) C Lindqvist (Denmark) T Scheuer-Larsen	0	1^{r}
9	(South Africa) R Fairbank (Puerto Rico) G Fernández	6	0

Quarterfinals
11	(Soviet Union) L Savchenko (Soviet Union) N Zvereva	6	6
9	(South Africa) R Fairbank (United States) G Fernández	4	2

==== Section 2 ====
First round
4	(United States) L McNeil (United States) E Nagelsen	6	6	6
(France) N Herreman (France) P Paradis	7	3	4
(United States) A Henricksson (Switzerland) C Jolissaint	6	6
(United States) E Hakami (United States) J Kaplan	4	0
(Belgium) A Devries (Belgium) S Wasserman	7	6
(West Germany) A Betzner (Austria) J Wiesner	5	3
(United States) Ca MacGregor (United States) Cy MacGregor	5	6	3
14	(United Kingdom) J Durie (United States) S Walsh-Pete	7	3	6
17	(Netherlands) M Bollegraf (Australia) N Provis	2	7	6
(United States) P Fendick (Canada) J Hetherington	6	6	3
(United States) S Collins (United States) N Hu	7	6
(Czechoslovakia) I Budařová (West Germany) C Singer	5	4
(United States) C Benjamin (Australia) A Scott	6	7
WC	(United Kingdom) A Simpkin (United Kingdom) J Tacon	2	6
WC	(United Kingdom) S Godman (United Kingdom) A Niepel	0	1
8	(United States) K Adams (United States) Z Garrison	6	6

Second round
4	(United States) L McNeil (United States) E Nagelsen	6	3	6
(United States) A Henricksson (Switzerland) C Jolissaint	3	6	4
(Belgium) A Devries (Belgium) S Wasserman	6	4	3
14	(United Kingdom) J Durie (United States) S Walsh-Pete	3	6	6
17	(Netherlands) M Bollegraf (Australia) N Provis	6	6
(United States) S Collins (United States) N Hu	4	1
(United States) C Benjamin (Australia) A Scott	2	2
8	(United States) K Adams (United States) Z Garrison	6	6

Third round
4	(United States) L McNeil (United States) E Nagelsen	7	3	6
14	(United Kingdom) J Durie (United States) S Walsh-Pete	5	6	3
17	(Netherlands) M Bollegraf (Australia) N Provis	1	0
8	(United States) K Adams (United States) Z Garrison	6	6

Quarterfinals
4	(United States) L McNeil (United States) B Nagelsen	4	3
8	(United States) K Adams (United States) Z Garrison	6	6

=== Bottom half ===
==== Section 3 ====
First round
7	(United States) E Burgin (United States) R White	4	2
Q	(France) A Dechaume (France) E Derly	6	6
(United States) K Horvath (Australia) M Jaggard	5	6	6
(United States) A Frazier (United States) L Spadea	7	3	2
LL	(United States) A Grossman (Japan) M Yanagi	1	4
(Sweden) M Lindström (West Germany) C Porwik	6	6
(United States) M Louie Harper (United States) H Ludloff	3	4
12	(Australia) H Mandlíková (United States) B Potter	6	6
13	(United States) C Evert (Australia) W Turnbull	7	4	6
(Soviet Union) N Bykova (Soviet Union) N Medvedeva	6	6	1
(Netherlands) N Jagerman (United States) S Rehe	6	2	6
(Japan) K Okamoto (Japan) N Sato	4	6	1
(Canada) H Kelesi (France) C Tanvier	6	6
(United States) P Barg (United States) M-L Daniels	2	4
(Netherlands) C Bakkum (Netherlands) B Schultz	3	4
5	(Czechoslovakia) J Novotná (France) C Suire	6	6

Second round
Q	(France) A Dechaume (France) E Derly	6	6
(United States) K Horvath (Australia) M Jaggard	1	3
(Sweden) M Lindström (West Germany) C Porwik	7	2	7
12	(Australia) H Mandlíková (United States) B Potter	6	6	5
13	(United States) C Evert (Australia) W Turnbull	7	6	7
(Netherlands) N Jagerman (United States) S Rehe	6	7	5
(Canada) H Kelesi (France) C Tanvier	5	6	1
5	(Czechoslovakia) J Novotná (France) C Suire	7	2	6

Third round
Q	(France) A Dechaume (France) E Derly	0	2
(Sweden) M Lindström (West Germany) C Porwik	6	6
13	(United States) C Evert (Australia) W Turnbull	0	7	6
5	(Czechoslovakia) J Novotná (France) C Suire	6	6	1

Quarterfinals
(Sweden) M Lindström (West Germany) C Porwik	6	5	2
13	(United States) C Evert (Australia) W Turnbull	3	7	6

==== Section 4 ====
First round
6	(West Germany) E Pfaff (Australia) E Smylie	5	6	6
(United States) R Casals (United States) J Russell	7	3	2
(South Africa) K Schimper (United States) W Wood	7	6	3
(United States) G Magers (United States) W White	5	7	6
Q	(Australia) J-A Faull (Australia) R McQuillan	2	6	6
(Hong Kong) P Hy (South Africa) D van Rensburg	6	4	4
WC	(United Kingdom) V Lake (United Kingdom) C Wood	6	4	1
16	(France) I Demongeot (France) N Tauziat	3	6	6
10	(Soviet Union) L Meskhi (Soviet Union) S Parkhomenko	6	6
WC	(United Kingdom) S Gomer (United Kingdom) J Salmon	4	3
(United States) B Herr (Bulgaria) K Maleeva	6	7
Q	(Australia) L Field (Switzerland) E Krapl	3	5
(Australia) A Minter (Netherlands) H Witvoet	6	6
(United States) A-M Fernandez (New Zealand) J Richardson	0	3
(West Germany) I Cueto (Brazil) P Medrado	1	2
3	(West Germany) S Graf (Argentina) G Sabatini	6	6

Second round
6	(West Germany) E Pfaff (Australia) E Smylie	6	6	6
(United States) G Magers (United States) W White	7	2	4
Q	(Australia) J-A Faull (Australia) R McQuillan	2	5
16	(France) I Demongeot (France) N Tauziat	6	7
10	(Soviet Union) L Meskhi (Soviet Union) S Parkhomenko	4	6
(United States) B Herr (Bulgaria) K Maleeva	6	7
(Australia) A Minter (Netherlands) H Witvoet	6	6	5
3	(West Germany) S Graf (Argentina) G Sabatini	7	4	7

Third round
6	(West Germany) E Pfaff (Australia) E Smylie	6	6
16	(France) I Demongeot (France) N Tauziat	2	3
(United States) B Herr (Bulgaria) K Maleeva	3	3
3	(West Germany) S Graf (Argentina) G Sabatini	6	6

Quarterfinals
6	(West Germany) E Pfaff (Australia) E Smylie	6	7	6
3	(West Germany) S Graf (Argentina) G Sabatini	7	5	8
