= 1988 Wimbledon Championships – Mixed doubles =

Mixed doubles
- 1988 Wimbledon Championships

Final
- Champions: (United States) Sherwood Stewart (United States) Zina Garrison
- Runners-up: (United States) Kelly Jones (United States) Gretchen Magers
- Score: 6–1, 7–6^{(7–3)}

Details
- Draw: 64 (3 Q / 6 WC )
- Seeds: 16

Events
Singles	men	women		boys	girls
Doubles	men	women	mixed	boys	girls
WC Singles	men	women	quad
WC Doubles	men	women	quad
Legends	men	women	seniors
← 1987 ·	Wimbledon Championships	· 1989 →

Jeremy Bates and Jo Durie were the defending champions but lost in the second round to Eddie Edwards and Elna Reinach.

Sherwood Stewart and Zina Garrison defeated Kelly Jones and Gretchen Magers in the final, 6–1, 7–6^{(7–3)} to win the mixed doubles tennis title at the 1988 Wimbledon Championships.

== Seeds ==
1. (Spain) Emilio Sánchez / (United States) Martina Navratilova (quarterfinals)
2. (Australia) John Fitzgerald / (Australia) Elizabeth Smylie (semifinals)
3. (United States) Jim Pugh / (Czechoslovakia) Jana Novotná (second round)
4. (United States) Paul Annacone / (United States) Betsy Nagelsen (third round)
5. (South Africa) Christo van Rensburg / (Australia) Hana Mandlíková (first round)
6. (South Africa) Danie Visser / (South Africa) Rosalyn Fairbank (third round)
7. (United Kingdom) Jeremy Bates / (United Kingdom) Jo Durie (second round)
8. (United States) Jim Grabb / (United States) Elise Burgin (first round)
9. (Czechoslovakia) Pavel Složil / (West Germany) Steffi Graf (second round, withdrew)
10. (United States) Rick Leach / (United States) Patty Fendick (semifinals)
11. (Australia) Darren Cahill / (Australia) Nicole Provis (quarterfinals)
12. (Netherlands) Tom Nijssen / (Netherlands) Manon Bollegraf (first round)
13. (Denmark) Michael Mortensen / (Denmark) Tine Scheuer-Larsen (third round, withdrew)
14. (United States) Sherwood Stewart / (United States) Zina Garrison (champions)
15. (United States) Robert Van't Hof / (United States) Mary-Lou Daniels (first round)
16. (United States) Marcel Freeman / (United States) Lori McNeil (quarterfinals)

Click on the seed number of a player to go to their draw section.

== Draw ==
=== Key ===
- Q = Qualifier
- WC = Wild card
- LL = Lucky loser
- Alt = Alternate
- SE = Special exempt
- PR = Protected ranking
- ITF = ITF entry
- JE = Junior exempt
- w/o = Walkover
- r = Retired
- d = Defaulted
- SR = Special ranking

=== Finals ===
Quarterfinals
1	(Spain) Emilio Sánchez (United States) Martina Navratilova	6	4^{r}
(United States) Kelly Jones (United States) Gretchen Magers	7	4
10	(United States) Rick Leach (United States) Patty Fendick	6	5	6
16	(United States) Marcel Freeman (United States) Lori McNeil	4	7	4
14	(United States) Sherwood Stewart (United States) Zina Garrison	7	7
11	(Australia) Darren Cahill (Australia) Nicole Provis	6	5
(United States) Tim Pawsat (United States) Beth Herr	2	3
2	(Australia) John Fitzgerald (Australia) Elizabeth Smylie	6	6

Semifinals
(United States) Kelly Jones (United States) Gretchen Magers	7	5	6
10	(United States) Rick Leach (United States) Patty Fendick	6	7	4
14	(United States) Sherwood Stewart (United States) Zina Garrison	6	6	6
2	(Australia) John Fitzgerald (Australia) Elizabeth Smylie	4	7	3

Final
(United States) Kelly Jones (United States) Gretchen Magers	1	6^{3}
14	(United States) Sherwood Stewart (United States) Zina Garrison	6	7^{7}

=== Top half ===
==== Section 1 ====
First round
1	(Spain) E Sánchez (United States) M Navratilova	6	6
(United States) L Shiras (United States) S Rehe	4	4
(South Africa) P Aldrich (South Africa) L Gregory	6	6
(United States) S Denton (Netherlands) B Schultz	4	4
(Australia) B Dyke (United States) J Kaplan	7	6
LL	(United States) G Layendecker (United States) S Stafford	6	3
LL	(South Africa) S Kruger (United States) M Van Nostrand	7	6
12	(Netherlands) T Nijssen (Netherlands) M Bollegraf	6	2
13	(Denmark) M Mortensen (Denmark) T Scheuer-Larsen	6	5	6
LL	(Australia) P Hoysted (Australia) T Morton	1	7	3
Q	(United States) C Miller (United States) J Smoller	4	4
(New Zealand) K Evernden (New Zealand) J Richardson	6	6
(Australia) C Limberger (Australia) A Scott	3	4
(Australia) D Macpherson (Australia) J Byrne	6	6
(United States) K Jones (United States) G Magers	6	7
8	(United States) J Grabb (United States) E Burgin	3	6

Second round
1	(Spain) E Sánchez (United States) M Navratilova	6	6
(South Africa) P Aldrich (South Africa) L Gregory	3	4
(Australia) B Dyke (United States) J Kaplan	6	6	4
LL	(South Africa) S Kruger (United States) M Van Nostrand	7	1	6
13	(Denmark) M Mortensen (Denmark) T Scheuer-Larsen	4	6	6
(New Zealand) K Evernden (New Zealand) J Richardson	6	3	2
(Australia) D Macpherson (Australia) J Byrne	6	5	2
(United States) K Jones (United States) G Magers	4	7	6

Third round
1	(Spain) E Sánchez (United States) M Navratilova	6	3	6
LL	(South Africa) S Kruger (United States) M Van Nostrand	4	6	3
13	(Denmark) M Mortensen (Denmark) T Scheuer-Larsen
(United States) K Jones (United States) G Magers	w/o

Quarterfinals
1	(Spain) E Sánchez (United States) M Navratilova	6	4^{r}
(United States) K Jones (United States) G Magers	7	4

==== Section 2 ====
First round
3	(United States) J Pugh (Czechoslovakia) J Novotná	6	6
(South Africa) W Green (South Africa) D van Rensburg	3	1
(Netherlands) M Schapers (United States) A Henricksson	4	6	3
(United States) E Korita (United States) P Barg	6	3	6
(United States) A Kohlberg (Australia) D Balestrat	4	4
(Australia) P Carter (Netherlands) C Bakkum	6	6
(United States) L Scott (United States) B Potter	6	5
10	(United States) R Leach (United States) P Fendick	7	7
16	(United States) M Freeman (United States) L McNeil	6	6
(Nigeria) N Odizor (United States) C Reynolds	0	0
(United States) C Beckman (United States) C Benjamin	6	7
(United States) M Davis (United States) T Phelps	4	6
(Australia) M Woodforde (Australia) M Jaggard	6	6
(Canada) G Connell (Canada) H Kelesi	3	4
WC	(United Kingdom) N Fulwood (United Kingdom) J Salmon	6	6
5	(South Africa) C van Rensburg (Australia) H Mandlíková	4	4

Second round
3	(United States) J Pugh (Czechoslovakia) J Novotná	6	6	3
(United States) E Korita (United States) P Barg	7	2	6
(Australia) P Carter (Netherlands) C Bakkum	1	6
10	(United States) R Leach (United States) P Fendick	6	7
16	(United States) M Freeman (United States) L McNeil	6	6	6
(United States) C Beckman (United States) C Benjamin	2	7	4
(Australia) M Woodforde (Australia) M Jaggard	7	1	7
WC	(United Kingdom) N Fulwood (United Kingdom) J Salmon	5	6	5

Third round
(United States) E Korita (United States) P Barg	6	4
10	(United States) R Leach (United States) P Fendick	7	6
16	(United States) M Freeman (United States) L McNeil	7	6
(Australia) M Woodforde (Australia) M Jaggard	6	1

Quarterfinals
10	(United States) R Leach (United States) P Fendick	6	5	6
16	(United States) M Freeman (United States) L McNeil	4	7	4

=== Bottom half ===
==== Section 3 ====
First round
7	(United Kingdom) J Bates (United Kingdom) J Durie	7	4	6
(United Kingdom) A Castle (France) C Suire	6	6	3
(Australia) L Warder (West Germany) C Porwik	6	5
(South Africa) E Edwards (South Africa) E Reinach	7	7
(United States) M Bauer (West Germany) E Pfaff	4	6	8
(Chile) R Acuña (Canada) J Hetherington	6	3	10
(Australia) M Fancutt (United States) R Casals	4	5
14	(United States) S Stewart (United States) Z Garrison	6	7
11	(Australia) D Cahill (Australia) N Provis	6	4	6
(United States) T Nelson (United States) R White	4	6	3
(United States) P Chamberlin (Hong Kong) P Hy	3	4
(Sweden) M Tideman (Australia) L Field	6	6
(Brazil) D Marcelino (Brazil) G Miró	7	6
(South Africa) B Levine (United States) R Reis	6	4
(Australia) T Woodbridge (Netherlands) H Witvoet	6	6
4	(United States) P Annacone (United States) E Nagelsen	7	7

Second round
7	(United Kingdom) J Bates (United Kingdom) J Durie	7	3	5
(South Africa) E Edwards (South Africa) E Reinach	5	6	7
(Chile) R Acuña (Canada) J Hetherington	2	6	3
14	(United States) S Stewart (United States) Z Garrison	6	3	6
11	(Australia) D Cahill (Australia) N Provis	6	7
(Sweden) M Tideman (Australia) L Field	3	5
(Brazil) D Marcelino (Brazil) G Miró
4	(United States) P Annacone (United States) E Nagelsen	w/o

Third round
(South Africa) E Edwards (South Africa) E Reinach	1	5
14	(United States) S Stewart (United States) Z Garrison	6	7
11	(Australia) D Cahill (Australia) N Provis	6	5	6
4	(United States) P Annacone (United States) E Nagelsen	3	7	0

Quarterfinals
14	(United States) S Stewart (United States) Z Garrison	7	7
11	(Australia) D Cahill (Australia) N Provis	6	5

==== Section 4 ====
First round
6	(South Africa) D Visser (South Africa) R Fairbank	6	6
WC	(United States) K Flach (Canada) C Bassett-Seguso	4	3
WC	(United Kingdom) J Lloyd (Australia) W Turnbull	5	3
WC	(United Kingdom) S Shaw (Sweden) C Lindqvist	7	6
(Spain) J Sánchez (Spain) A Sánchez Vicario	5	6	5
(United States) T Pawsat (United States) E Herr	7	3	7
LL	(United Kingdom) M Walker (United Kingdom) J Tacon	3	3
9/ WC	(Czechoslovakia) P Složil (West Germany) S Graf	6	6
15	(United States) R Van't Hof (United States) M-L Daniels	4	4
(Australia) S Youl (Australia) A Minter	6	6
Q	(The Bahamas) R Smith (United States) K Foxworth	6	1	4
WC	(United Kingdom) C Bailey (United Kingdom) T Catlin	4	6	6
Q	(Australia) S Barr (United States) S Collins	6	6
(United States) C Hooper (United States) P Smith	4	3
(United States) P Fleming (United States) W White	1	7	2
2	(Australia) J Fitzgerald (Australia) E Smylie	6	6	6

Second round
6	(South Africa) D Visser (South Africa) R Fairbank	6	6
WC	(United Kingdom) S Shaw (Sweden) C Lindqvist	3	2
(United States) T Pawsat (United States) E Herr	w/o
9/ WC	(Czechoslovakia) P Složil (West Germany) S Graf
(Australia) S Youl (Australia) A Minter	6	6
WC	(United Kingdom) C Bailey (United Kingdom) T Catlin	2	4
Q	(Australia) S Barr (United States) S Collins	6	5	3
2	(Australia) J Fitzgerald (Australia) E Smylie	3	7	6

Third round
6	(South Africa) D Visser (South Africa) R Fairbank	5	2
(United States) T Pawsat (United States) E Herr	7	6
(Australia) S Youl (Australia) A Minter
2	(Australia) J Fitzgerald (Australia) E Smylie	w/o

Quarterfinals
(United States) T Pawsat (United States) E Herr	2	3
2	(Australia) J Fitzgerald (Australia) E Smylie	6	6
