= 1988 Wimbledon Championships – Women's singles =

Women's singles
- 1988 Wimbledon Championships

Final
- Champion: (West Germany) Steffi Graf
- Runner-up: (United States) Martina Navratilova
- Score: 5–7, 6–2, 6–1

Details
- Draw: 128 (8 Q / 8 WC )
- Seeds: 16

Events
Singles	men	women		boys	girls
Doubles	men	women	mixed	boys	girls
WC Singles	men	women	quad
WC Doubles	men	women	quad
Legends	men	women	seniors
← 1987 ·	Wimbledon Championships	· 1989 →

Steffi Graf defeated six-time defending champion Martina Navratilova in a rematch of the previous year's final, 5–7, 6–2, 6–1 to win the ladies' singles tennis title at the 1988 Wimbledon Championships. It was her first Wimbledon singles title and fourth major title overall. It was also Graf's third step towards completing the first, and so far only Golden Slam in the history of tennis. This marked the second of three years that Graf and Navratilova contested the Wimbledon final.

The semifinal between Chris Evert and Navratilova marked the 22nd and last time they faced each other in a major, with Navratilova extending her lead in their head-to-head rivalry at the majors to 14–8.

== Seeds ==
1. (West Germany) Steffi Graf (champion)
2. (United States) Martina Navratilova (final)
3. (United States) Pam Shriver (semifinals)
4. (United States) Chris Evert (semifinals)
5. (Argentina) Gabriela Sabatini (fourth round)
6. (Czechoslovakia) Helena Suková (quarterfinals)
7. (Bulgaria) Manuela Maleeva-Fragnière (first round)
8. (Soviet Union) Natasha Zvereva (fourth round)
9. (Australia) Hana Mandlíková (third round)
10. (United States) Lori McNeil (third round)
11. (West Germany) Claudia Kohde-Kilsch (withdrew)
12. (United States) Zina Garrison (quarterfinals)
13. (Soviet Union) Larisa Savchenko (fourth round)
14. (Bulgaria) Katerina Maleeva (fourth round)
15. (West Germany) Sylvia Hanika (third round)
16. (United States) Mary Joe Fernández (fourth round)

Click on the seed number of a player to go to their draw section.

Claudia Kohde-Kilsch withdrew due to a knee injury. She was replaced in the draw by lucky loser Shaun Stafford.

== Draw ==
=== Key ===
- Q = Qualifier
- WC = Wild card
- LL = Lucky loser
- Alt = Alternate
- ITF = ITF entry
- PR = Protected ranking
- SR = Special ranking
- SE = Special exempt
- JE = Junior exempt
- JR = Junior Accelerator Programme entrant
- CO = College Accelerator Programme entrant
- NG = Next Gen Accelerator Program entrant
- w/o = Walkover
- r = Retired
- d = Defaulted

=== Finals ===
Quarterfinals
1	(West Germany) Steffi Graf	6	6
(France) Pascale Paradis	3	1
3	(United States) Pam Shriver	6	6
12	(United States) Zina Garrison	4	4
6	(Czechoslovakia) Helena Suková	3	6^{4}
4	(United States) Chris Evert	6	7^{7}
(South Africa) Rosalyn Fairbank	6	4	5
2	(United States) Martina Navratilova	4	6	7

Semifinals
1	(West Germany) Steffi Graf	6	6
3	(United States) Pam Shriver	1	2
4	(United States) Chris Evert	1	6	5
2	(United States) Martina Navratilova	6	4	7

Final
1	(West Germany) Steffi Graf	5	6	6
2	(United States) Martina Navratilova	7	2	1

=== Top half ===
==== Section 1 ====
First round
1	(West Germany) S Graf	6	6
(United States) N Hu	0	0
LL	(France) K Quentrec	7^{7}	6
(France) J Halard	6^{3}	1
(United States) M Louie Harper	7^{7}	3	4
WC	(United Kingdom) S Loosemore	6^{2}	6	6
(United States) T Phelps	7	6^{0}	6
(Australia) W Turnbull	5	7^{7}	0
(Poland) I Kuczyńska	5	6	6
(United States) E Nagelsen	7	1	3
(West Germany) E Pfaff	5	3
Q	(Australia) L Field	7	6
Q	(United States) S Collins	4	6	7
(Soviet Union) L Meskhi	6	4	9
(Netherlands) N Jagerman	3	2
16	(United States) MJ Fernández	6	6

Second round
1	(West Germany) S Graf	6	6
LL	(France) K Quentrec	2	0
WC	(United Kingdom) S Loosemore	1	1
(United States) T Phelps	6	6
(Poland) I Kuczyńska	7	6
Q	(Australia) L Field	5	4
(Soviet Union) L Meskhi	1	5
16	(United States) MJ Fernández	6	7

Third round
1	(West Germany) S Graf	6	6
(United States) T Phelps	3	1
(Poland) I Kuczyńska	4	1
16	(United States) MJ Fernández	6	6

Fourth round
1	(West Germany) S Graf	6	6
16	(United States) MJ Fernández	2	2

==== Section 2 ====
First round
9	(Australia) H Mandlíková	6	7
(Italy) L Garrone	3	5
(United States) A Henricksson	6	6
(United States) B Herr	3	2
(Netherlands) M Bollegraf	6	6
(Italy) B Romanò	1	4
(Australia) A Minter	6	6
(Czechoslovakia) A Holíková	3	0
(Austria) J Wiesner	3	7	3
(Italy) L Golarsa	6	5	6
(United States) R White	3	6	6
WC	(United Kingdom) C Wood	6	3	3
(France) N Herreman	6	6
(United States) S Walsh-Pete	2	2
(France) P Paradis	6	6
7	(Bulgaria) M Maleeva-Fragnière	4	3

Second round
9	(Australia) H Mandlíková	6	6
(United States) A Henricksson	4	2
(Netherlands) M Bollegraf	2	2
(Australia) A Minter	6	6
(Italy) L Golarsa	4	2
(United States) R White	6	6
(France) N Herreman	4	6	6
(France) P Paradis	6	3	8

Third round
9	(Australia) H Mandlíková	4	3
(Australia) A Minter	6	6
(United States) R White	4	6	7
(France) P Paradis	6	3	9

Fourth round
(Australia) A Minter	3	7	4
(France) P Paradis	6	5	6

==== Section 3 ====
First round
3	(United States) P Shriver	6	4	8
(South Africa) D van Rensburg	2	6	6
(Canada) J Hetherington	6	4	3
(Soviet Union) S Parkhomenko	4	6	6
(West Germany) C Porwik	5	4
LL	(Australia) L O'Neill	7	6
(France) C Suire	3	7	4
(United States) S Rehe	6	5	6
(United Kingdom) M Javer	6	3	7
(West Germany) S Meier	2	6	9
(New Zealand) B Cordwell	6	6
(United States) E Burgin	4	3
WC	(United Kingdom) L Gould	6^{6}	2
(West Germany) I Cueto	7^{8}	6
WC	(United Kingdom) A Simpkin	1	0
14	(Bulgaria) K Maleeva	6	6

Second round
3	(United States) P Shriver	6	6
(Soviet Union) S Parkhomenko	3	4
LL	(Australia) L O'Neill	6	1	4
(United States) S Rehe	4	6	6
(West Germany) S Meier	1	7	4
(New Zealand) B Cordwell	6	5	6
(West Germany) I Cueto	0	4
14	(Bulgaria) K Maleeva	6	6

Third round
3	(United States) P Shriver	7^{7}	7^{7}
(United States) S Rehe	6^{5}	6^{5}
(New Zealand) B Cordwell	0	0
14	(Bulgaria) K Maleeva	6	6

Fourth round
3	(United States) P Shriver	6	6
14	(Bulgaria) K Maleeva	2	2

==== Section 4 ====
First round
12	(United States) Z Garrison	6	6
(United States) W White	3	1
(Italy) F Bonsignori	7^{9}	3	0
(Australia) D Balestrat	6^{7}	6	6
(Puerto Rico) G Fernández	2	6	8
(Netherlands) B Schultz	6	4	6
(United States) A Frazier	5	4
(Australia) E Minter	7	6
(France) C Tanvier	6	6
(Brazil) P Medrado	3	1
WC	(United Kingdom) A Grunfeld	4	5
(United States) M Gurney	6	7
(Czechoslovakia) R Zrubáková	6	7^{7}
(United States) H Ludloff	3	6^{4}
(Canada) C Bassett-Seguso	2	2
5	(Argentina) G Sabatini	6	6

Second round
12	(United States) Z Garrison	6	6
(Australia) D Balestrat	4	3
(Puerto Rico) G Fernández	3	6	3
(Australia) E Minter	6	3	6
(France) C Tanvier	6	6
(United States) M Gurney	3	3
(Czechoslovakia) R Zrubáková	4	3
5	(Argentina) G Sabatini	6	6

Third round
12	(United States) Z Garrison	7^{7}	6
(Australia) E Minter	6^{3}	0
(France) C Tanvier	2	3
5	(Argentina) G Sabatini	6	6

Fourth round
12	(United States) Z Garrison	6	3	6
5	(Argentina) G Sabatini	1	6	2

=== Bottom half ===
==== Section 5 ====
First round
6	(Czechoslovakia) H Suková	7	1	6
(France) I Demongeot	5	6	2
(Czechoslovakia) J Novotná	6	7
(Denmark) T Scheuer-Larsen	3	5
(Japan) E Inoue	5	7	6
(West Germany) W Probst	7	5	2
Q	(United States) P Barg	6^{5}	4
(United Kingdom) S Gomer	7^{7}	6
(Switzerland) E Krapl	3	6	3
(Soviet Union) N Bykova	6	3	6
(United States) B Potter	6	7^{7}
(Italy) L Lapi	3	6^{3}
(Sweden) M Lindström	6^{5}	3
Q	(Australia) J-A Faull	7^{7}	6
(Czechoslovakia) I Budařová	7^{7}	6
LL	(United States) S Stafford	6^{5}	3

Second round
6	(Czechoslovakia) H Suková	6	6
(Czechoslovakia) J Novotná	2	2
(Japan) E Inoue	6	6
(United Kingdom) S Gomer	4	2
(Soviet Union) N Bykova	6	4	7
(United States) B Potter	2	6	9
Q	(Australia) J-A Faull	5	6	6
(Czechoslovakia) I Budařová	7	1	4

Third round
6	(Czechoslovakia) H Suková	6^{4}	6	6
(Japan) E Inoue	7^{7}	3	2
(United States) B Potter	4	6	6
Q	(Australia) J-A Faull	6	3	4

Fourth round
6	(Czechoslovakia) H Suková	7^{7}	6
(United States) B Potter	6^{4}	4

==== Section 6 ====
First round
15	(West Germany) S Hanika	6	6
(United States) H Cioffi	1	2
(Australia) M Jaggard	2	2
(Netherlands) H Witvoet	6	6
WC	(United Kingdom) V Lake	3	2
(United States) K Adams	6	6
(France) N Tauziat	6	6
(Belgium) A Devries	2	4
(Spain) A Sánchez Vicario	3	4
Q	(Japan) K Okamoto	6	6
(Brazil) G Miró	6	0	2
(Japan) A Kijimuta	4	6	6
(West Germany) C Singer	6	6
(Belgium) S Wasserman	4	0
(France) A Dechaume	1	2
4	(United States) C Evert	6	6

Second round
15	(West Germany) S Hanika	6	6
(Netherlands) H Witvoet	1	3
(United States) K Adams	2	6	6
(France) N Tauziat	6	4	4
Q	(Japan) K Okamoto	5	3
(Japan) A Kijimuta	7	6
(West Germany) C Singer	4	6	3
4	(United States) C Evert	6	3	6

Third round
15	(West Germany) S Hanika	3	3
(United States) K Adams	6	6
(Japan) A Kijimuta	4	0
4	(United States) C Evert	6	6

Fourth round
(United States) K Adams	7	3	0
4	(United States) C Evert	5	6	6

==== Section 7 ====
First round
8	(Soviet Union) N Zvereva	6	6
Q	(United States) R Reis	2	3
(United States) P Fendick	6	6
(United States) C Benjamin	2	3
(Switzerland) C Jolissaint	6^{3}	6	6
Q	(South Africa) L Gregory	7^{7}	4	3
(Sweden) C Lindqvist	6^{3}	4
(South Africa) E Reinach	7^{7}	6
(United Kingdom) J Durie	6	6
(United States) M Werdel	4	2
(South Africa) R Fairbank	6	6
(United States) M-L Daniels	2	3
(United States) S Sloane	6	6
WC	(United Kingdom) T Catlin	3	1
(Australia) N Provis	3	5
10	(United States) L McNeil	6	7

Second round
8	(Soviet Union) N Zvereva	6	6
(United States) P Fendick	3	3
(Switzerland) C Jolissaint	1	4
(South Africa) E Reinach	6	6
(United Kingdom) J Durie	2	6	5
(South Africa) R Fairbank	6	1	7
(United States) S Sloane	7^{7}	4	4
10	(United States) L McNeil	6^{3}	6	6

Third round
8	(Soviet Union) N Zvereva	6	7^{7}
(South Africa) E Reinach	2	6^{4}
(South Africa) R Fairbank	7^{7}	6
10	(United States) L McNeil	6^{3}	4

Fourth round
8	(Soviet Union) N Zvereva	2	4
(South Africa) R Fairbank	6	6

==== Section 8 ====
First round
13	(Soviet Union) L Savchenko	6	6
(Australia) J Byrne	2	2
(Japan) M Yanagi	6	6
(United States) B Gerken	4	1
(Argentina) A Villagrán	6	6
(Italy) L Ferrando	3	3
(Australia) E Smylie	4	4
WC	(United Kingdom) J Salmon	6	6
(United States) G Magers	7^{7}	3	7
(Canada) H Kelesi	6^{5}	6	5
Q	(United Kingdom) K Hunter	3	2
(South Africa) K Schimper	6	6
(United States) K Horvath	4	4
(United States) E Hakami	6	6
(Socialist Federal Republic of Yugoslavia) S Goleš	1	2
2	(United States) M Navratilova	6	6

Second round
13	(Soviet Union) L Savchenko	7^{7}	6
(Japan) M Yanagi	6^{4}	3
(Argentina) A Villagrán	7^{7}	1	2
WC	(United Kingdom) J Salmon	6^{1}	6	6
(United States) G Magers	4	6^{6}
(South Africa) K Schimper	6	7^{8}
(United States) E Hakami	2	1
2	(United States) M Navratilova	6	6

Third round
13	(Soviet Union) L Savchenko	6	6
WC	(United Kingdom) J Salmon	1	2
(South Africa) K Schimper	0	4
2	(United States) M Navratilova	6	6

Fourth round
13	(Soviet Union) L Savchenko	4	2
2	(United States) M Navratilova	6	6

== See also ==
- Evert–Navratilova rivalry
