= 1988 Wimbledon Championships – Men's doubles =

Men's doubles
- 1988 Wimbledon Championships

Final
- Champions: (United States) Ken Flach (United States) Robert Seguso
- Runners-up: (Australia) John Fitzgerald (Sweden) Anders Järryd
- Score: 6–4, 2–6, 6–4, 7–6^{(7–3)}

Details
- Draw: 64 (5 Q / 5 WC )
- Seeds: 16

Events
Singles	men	women		boys	girls
Doubles	men	women	mixed	boys	girls
WC Singles	men	women	quad
WC Doubles	men	women	quad
Legends	men	women	seniors
← 1987 ·	Wimbledon Championships	· 1989 →

Ken Flach and Robert Seguso successfully defended their title, defeating John Fitzgerald and Anders Järryd in the final, 6–4, 2–6, 6–4, 7–6^{(7–3)} to win the gentlemen's doubles title at the 1988 Wimbledon Championships.

== Seeds ==
1. (United States) Ken Flach / (United States) Robert Seguso (champions)
2. (Australia) John Fitzgerald / (Sweden) Anders Järryd (final)
3. (Spain) Sergio Casal / (Spain) Emilio Sánchez (second round)
4. n/a
5. (France) Guy Forget / (Czechoslovakia) Tomáš Šmíd (quarterfinals)
6. (United States) Rick Leach / (United States) Jim Pugh (third round)
7. (United States) Paul Annacone / (South Africa) Christo van Rensburg (second round)
8. (New Zealand) Kelly Evernden / (United States) Johan Kriek (quarterfinals)
9. (Australia) Darren Cahill / (Socialist Federal Republic of Yugoslavia) Slobodan Živojinović (second round)
10. (Australia) Wally Masur / (Australia) Mark Woodforde (quarterfinals)
11. (United States) Marty Davis / (Australia) Brad Drewett (first round)
12. (South Africa) Pieter Aldrich / (South Africa) Danie Visser (quarterfinals)
13. n/a
14. (United States) Andy Kohlberg / (United States) Robert Van't Hof (first round)
15. (Australia) Broderick Dyke / (Netherlands) Tom Nijssen (third round)
16. (United Kingdom) Jeremy Bates / (Sweden) Peter Lundgren (second round)

Click on the seed number of a player to go to their draw section.

== Draw ==
=== Key ===
- Q = Qualifier
- WC = Wild card
- LL = Lucky loser
- Alt = Alternate
- ITF = ITF entry
- PR = Protected ranking
- SR = Special ranking
- SE = Special exempt
- JE = Junior exempt
- JR = Junior Accelerator Programme entrant
- CO = College Accelerator Programme entrant
- NG = Next Gen Accelerator Program entrant
- w/o = Walkover
- r = Retired
- d = Defaulted

=== Finals ===
Quarterfinals
1	(United States) Ken Flach (United States) Robert Seguso	4	3	7	7	6
10	(Australia) Wally Masur (Australia) Mark Woodforde	6	6	6	5	2
(South Africa) Eddie Edwards (South Africa) Gary Muller	7	3	7	6
12	(South Africa) Pieter Aldrich (South Africa) Danie Visser	6	6	6	4
5	(France) Guy Forget (Czechoslovakia) Tomáš Šmíd	4	6	6
(Australia) Peter Doohan (United States) Jim Grabb	6	7	7
8	(New Zealand) Kelly Evernden (United States) Johan Kriek	6	3	3	4
2	(Australia) John Fitzgerald (Sweden) Anders Järryd	4	6	6	6

Semifinals
1	(United States) Ken Flach (United States) Robert Seguso	6	6	7
(South Africa) Eddie Edwards (South Africa) Gary Muller	4	4	6
(Australia) Peter Doohan (United States) Jim Grabb	6	2	6	6
2	(Australia) John Fitzgerald (Sweden) Anders Järryd	7	6	1	7

Final
1	(United States) Ken Flach (United States) Robert Seguso	6	2	6	7^{7}
2	(Australia) John Fitzgerald (Sweden) Anders Järryd	4	6	4	6^{3}

=== Top half ===
==== Section 1 ====
First round
1	(United States) K Flach (United States) R Seguso	6	7	6
(Czechoslovakia) S Birner (Czechoslovakia) J Navrátil	2	6	3
(United States) T Pawsat (Sweden) T Svantesson	7	7	1	2	6
(Australia) C Limberger (Netherlands) M Schapers	6	6	6	6	3
(Argentina) J Frana (Spain) J López-Maeso	2	2	6
WC	(Soviet Union) A Olhovskiy (Soviet Union) A Volkov	6	6	7
Q	(United States) M Basham (United States) L Jensen	6	4	6	6
15	(Australia) B Dyke (Netherlands) T Nijssen	7	6	3	7
10	(Australia) W Masur (Australia) M Woodforde	6	3	6	6
(Sweden) M Gustafsson (United States) M Purcell	2	6	3	4
(Australia) L Warder (Australia) S Youl	6	6	6
LL	(United Kingdom) A Brice (United Kingdom) J Goodall	2	3	2
(United States) J Ross (Australia) K Warwick	6	3	6
WC	(United Kingdom) J Lloyd (United Kingdom) S Shaw	7	6	7
(West Germany) T Meinecke (West Germany) R Osterthun	6	3	7	6
7	(United States) P Annacone (South Africa) C van Rensburg	1	6	6	4

Second round
1	(United States) K Flach (United States) R Seguso	6	7	6	6
(United States) T Pawsat (Sweden) T Svantesson	7	6	3	4
WC	(Soviet Union) A Olhovskiy (Soviet Union) A Volkov	6	7	6	4
15	(Australia) B Dyke (Netherlands) T Nijssen	7	6	7	6
10	(Australia) W Masur (Australia) M Woodforde	6	6	7
(Australia) L Warder (Australia) S Youl	2	4	6
WC	(United Kingdom) J Lloyd (United Kingdom) S Shaw	6	6	7
7	(United States) P Annacone (South Africa) C van Rensburg	4	4	5

Third round
1	(United States) K Flach (United States) R Seguso	7	6	7
15	(Australia) B Dyke (Netherlands) T Nijssen	6	1	6
10	(Australia) W Masur (Australia) M Woodforde	7	6	6
WC	(United Kingdom) J Lloyd (United Kingdom) S Shaw	6	3	2

Quarterfinals
1	(United States) K Flach (United States) R Seguso	4	3	7	7	6
10	(Australia) W Masur (Australia) M Woodforde	6	6	6	5	2

==== Section 2 ====
First round
3	(Spain) S Casal (Spain) E Sánchez	6	6	6
LL	(West Germany) H Moraing (West Germany) P Moraing	0	1	4
Q	(France) T Champion (France) É Winogradsky	6	0^{r}
(United States) M Anger (United States) G Holmes	7	4
WC	(Switzerland) H Günthardt (Hungary) B Taróczy	5	6	7	2	4
(United States) E Korita (Nigeria) N Odizor	7	4	6	6	6
(South Africa) E Edwards (South Africa) G Muller	7	4	6	7
14	(United States) A Kohlberg (United States) R Van't Hof	6	6	4	5
12	(South Africa) P Aldrich (South Africa) D Visser	7	7	6
(United States) D Dowlen (United States) M Freeman	6	6	4
Q	(Switzerland) S Medem (Finland) O Rahnasto	6	7	1	6	6
(Australia) P Carter (United States) L Shiras	4	5	6	7	2
Q	(United States) S DeVries (United States) R Matuszewski	6	6	3	4	4
(United States) M Flur (United States) T Siegel	3	2	6	6	6
(Mexico) L Lavalle (Spain) J Sánchez	5	6	7	6
6	(United States) R Leach (United States) J Pugh	7	7	6	7

Second round
3	(Spain) S Casal (Spain) E Sánchez	1	4	4
(United States) M Anger (United States) G Holmes	6	6	6
(United States) E Korita (Nigeria) N Odizor	6	6	6	7	4
(South Africa) E Edwards (South Africa) G Muller	3	7	7	6	6
12	(South Africa) P Aldrich (South Africa) D Visser	6	7	6
Q	(Switzerland) S Medem (Finland) O Rahnasto	4	6	1
(United States) M Flur (United States) T Siegel	0	4	6	5
6	(United States) R Leach (United States) J Pugh	6	6	2	7

Third round
(United States) M Anger (United States) G Holmes	6	3	6
(South Africa) E Edwards (South Africa) G Muller	7	6	7
12	(South Africa) P Aldrich (South Africa) D Visser	7	4	7	1	10
6	(United States) R Leach (United States) J Pugh	6	6	6	6	8

Quarterfinals
(South Africa) E Edwards (South Africa) G Muller	7	3	7	6
12	(South Africa) P Aldrich (South Africa) D Visser	6	6	6	4

=== Bottom half ===
==== Section 3 ====
First round
5	(France) G Forget (Czechoslovakia) T Šmíd	3	7	6	3	6
(Sweden) J Gunnarsson (Sweden) N Kroon	6	6	4	6	4
(United States) C Hooper (United States) T Nelson	4	6	1
Q	(South Africa) N Broad (South Africa) S Kruger	6	7	6
(Sweden) J Svensson (Sweden) M Tideman	6	6	2	3	7
WC	(United Kingdom) D Felgate (United Kingdom) N Fulwood	3	3	6	6	9
(United States) M De Palmer (United States) G Donnelly	6	6	6
11	(United States) M Davis (Australia) B Drewett	4	3	4
LL	(Brazil) G Barbosa (Brazil) M Menezes	2	3	4
LL	(India) Z Ali (India) M Ferreira	6	6	6
(Czechoslovakia) J Čihák (Czechoslovakia) K Nováček	5	7	6	4
(United States) S Davis (United States) D Goldie	7	5	7	6
(Australia) D Macpherson (Netherlands) H van Boeckel	5	6	7	6
(Australia) P Doohan (United States) J Grabb	7	7	6	7
(United States) P Chamberlin (United States) L Scott	5	6	6	6
LL	(South Africa) B Levine (United States) P Palandjian	7	4	2	4

Second round
5	(France) G Forget (Czechoslovakia) T Šmíd	7	4	6	3	6
Q	(South Africa) N Broad (South Africa) S Kruger	6	6	4	6	3
WC	(United Kingdom) D Felgate (United Kingdom) N Fulwood	3	6	6	4
(United States) M De Palmer (United States) G Donnelly	6	7	3	6
LL	(India) Z Ali (India) M Ferreira	4	3	2
(United States) S Davis (United States) D Goldie	6	6	6
(Australia) P Doohan (United States) J Grabb	6	6	7
(United States) P Chamberlin (United States) L Scott	3	2	6

Third round
5	(France) G Forget (Czechoslovakia) T Šmíd	7	6	6
(United States) M De Palmer (United States) G Donnelly	6	1	2
(United States) S Davis (United States) D Goldie	w/o
(Australia) P Doohan (United States) J Grabb

Quarterfinals
5	(France) G Forget (Czechoslovakia) T Šmíd	4	6	6
(Australia) P Doohan (United States) J Grabb	6	7	7

==== Section 4 ====
First round
8	(New Zealand) K Evernden (United States) J Kriek	6	6	6	4	7
(United States) S Giammalva (United States) R Reneberg	7	4	2	6	5
(United States) S Denton (United States) S Stewart	4	6	7	6	6
(Chile) R Acuña (Brazil) D Marcelino	6	3	5	7	4
(West Germany) E Jelen (West Germany) P Kühnen	3	7	6	7
(United States) C Beckman (United States) G Layendecker	6	5	3	6
(Italy) O Camporese (Italy) D Nargiso	6	3	0	6
9	(Australia) D Cahill (Socialist Federal Republic of Yugoslavia) S Živojinović	4	6	6	7
16	(United Kingdom) J Bates (Sweden) P Lundgren	6	6	7
WC	(United Kingdom) C Bailey (United Kingdom) M Petchey	4	2	5
(Canada) G Connell (Canada) G Michibata	7	6	6	4	8
(Australia) J Stoltenberg (Australia) T Woodbridge	6	3	7	6	6
(Iran) M Bahrami (Denmark) M Mortensen	7	6	7
(United States) K Jones (The Bahamas) R Smith	6	4	5
(Italy) P Canè (Czechoslovakia) P Korda	3	6	0	3
2	(Australia) J Fitzgerald (Sweden) A Järryd	6	3	6	6

Second round
8	(New Zealand) K Evernden (United States) J Kriek	7	6	6
(United States) S Denton (United States) S Stewart	5	4	4
(West Germany) E Jelen (West Germany) P Kühnen	6	7	6	6
9	(Australia) D Cahill (Socialist Federal Republic of Yugoslavia) S Živojinović	2	5	7	4
16	(United Kingdom) J Bates (Sweden) P Lundgren	3	4	4
(Canada) G Connell (Canada) G Michibata	6	6	6
(Iran) M Bahrami (Denmark) M Mortensen	1	2	1
2	(Australia) J Fitzgerald (Sweden) A Järryd	6	6	6

Third round
8	(New Zealand) K Evernden (United States) J Kriek	2	6	7	7
(West Germany) E Jelen (West Germany) P Kühnen	6	2	5	6
(Canada) G Connell (Canada) G Michibata	4	4	6
2	(Australia) J Fitzgerald (Sweden) A Järryd	6	6	7

Quarterfinals
8	(New Zealand) K Evernden (United States) J Kriek	6	3	3	4
2	(Australia) J Fitzgerald (Sweden) A Järryd	4	6	6	6
