= Michael Westphal =

German tennis player (1965–1991)

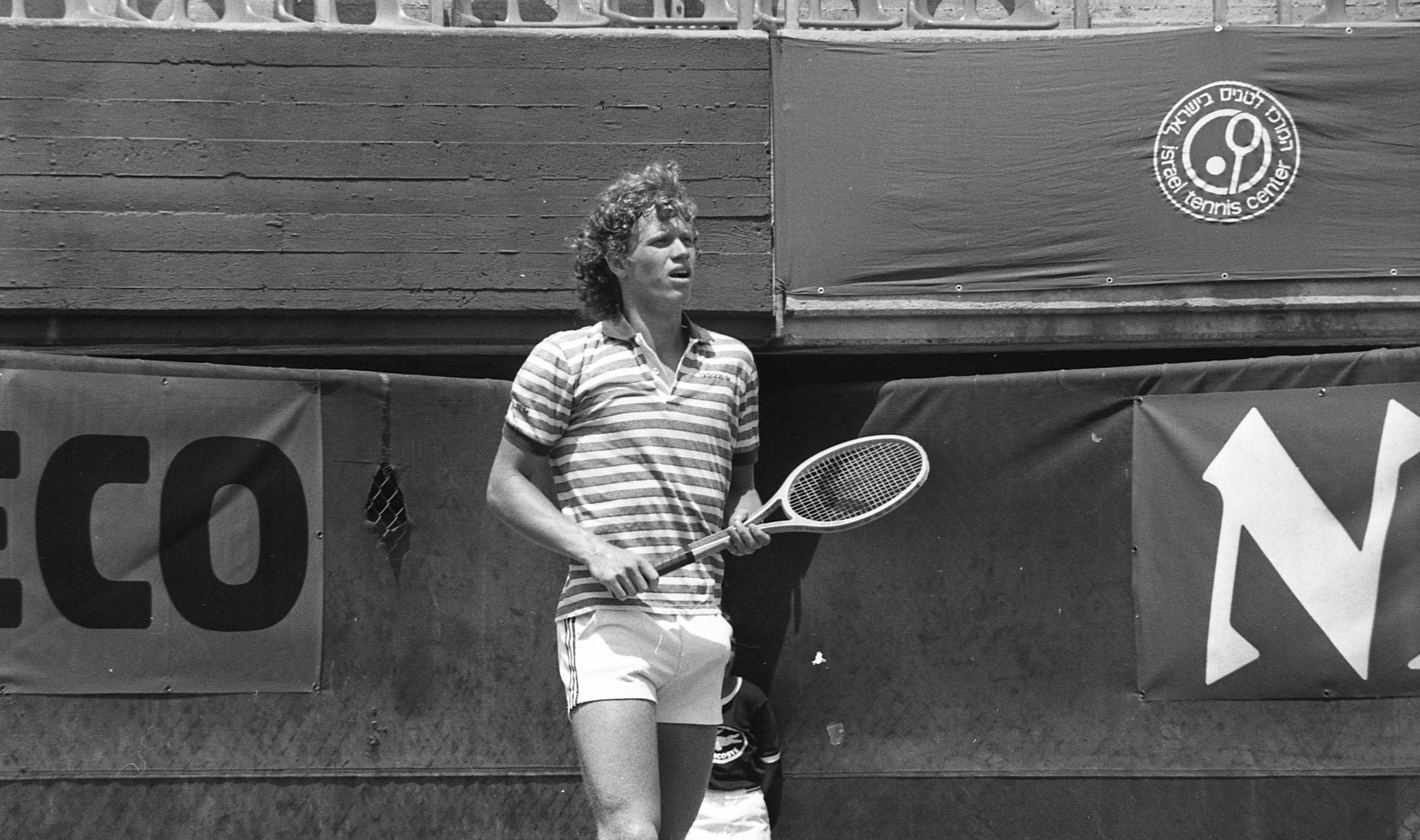
- Michael Westphal playing in 1983
- Country (sports): Germany
- Born: 19 February 1965; Pinneberg, West Germany
- Died: 22 June 1991 (aged 26); Hamburg, Germany
- Height: 1.90 m (6 ft 3 in)
- Turned pro: 1983
- Retired: 1990
- Plays: Right-handed
- Prize money: $1,646,328

Singles
- Career record: 82–107
- Career titles: 0
- Highest ranking: No. 49 (17 March 1986)

Grand Slam singles results
- Australian Open: 1R (1989)
- French Open: 2R (1984, 1987)
- Wimbledon: 2R (1986)
- US Open: 1R (1983, 1984)

Other tournaments
- Olympic Games: QF (1984, demonstration)

Doubles
- Career record: 6–22
- Career titles: 0
- Highest ranking: No. 239 (15 May 1989)

Michael Westphal (19 February 1965 – 20 June 1991) was a male tennis player from West Germany.

Westphal participated for his native country in the 1984 Summer Olympics, making it as far as the quarter-finals. The right-hander reached his highest ATP singles ranking of world No. 49 in March 1986.

Westphal died of complications from AIDS on 20 June 1991, aged 26.

== Career finals ==
=== Singles: 2 (0–2) ===
Result	W/L	Date	Tournament	Surface	Opponent	Score
Loss	0–1	Aug 1984	Livingston, U.S.	Hard	(United States) Johan Kriek	2–6, 4–6
Loss	0–2	Aug 1985	Kitzbühel, Austria	Clay	(Czechoslovakia) Pavel Složil	5–7, 2–6
