= Colin Beecher =

British tennis player and coach

- Full name: Colin Beecher
- Country (sports): Great Britain
- Born: 16 October 1970 (age 54); Croydon, England
- Plays: Right-handed (one-handed backhand)
- Prize money: $55,969

Singles
- Career record: 1–3
- Career titles: 0
- Highest ranking: No. 264 (20 November 1995)

Grand Slam singles results
- Wimbledon: 2R (1996)

Doubles
- Career record: 0–2
- Career titles: 0
- Highest ranking: No. 345 (1 November 1993)

Colin Beecher (born 16 October 1970) is a former professional tennis player from Great Britain.

== Biography ==
Beecher, a right-handed player from Croydon, competed on the professional circuit in the 1990s. He faced two of Britain's rising stars in qualifying at the 1992 Wimbledon Championships, beating Tim Henman in straight sets and then losing to Greg Rusedski, 10–12 in the deciding set (although Rusedski was still a Canadian at the time). He featured in the main draw for the only time at the 1996 Wimbledon Championships and reached the second round, with a first-round win over fellow wildcard Nick Gould. In the second round, he was beaten by Italian Renzo Furlan. On the ATP Tour he appeared in the main draw of two tournaments: Nottingham in 1995 and Bournemouth in 1996.

Now a tennis coach, Beecher previously worked for many years for the LTA and captained Great Britain in the 2006 Fed Cup. He was captain of the Great British side which made the Junior Davis Cup final in 2009 and served as a coach on the winning team for the 2015 Davis Cup. On an individual level, he has been the personal coach of several players, including Anne Keothavong and Kyle Edmund.
