= Rohit Rajpal =

Indian tennis player

- Country (sports): India
- Born: 22 January 1971 (age 54); Kanpur, India

Singles
- Career record: 0–1 (Davis Cup)
- Highest ranking: No. 524 (15 July 1991)

Doubles
- Highest ranking: No. 353 (19 August 1991)

Grand Slam doubles results
- Wimbledon: Q1 (1991)

Rohit Rajpal (born 22 January 1971) is an Indian former professional tennis player.

Rajpal played in one Davis Cup tie for India, against South Korea in 1990. He got his opportunity in a dead rubber reverse singles match, which he lost to Kim Jae-sik. In addition to his Davis Cup appearance, Rajpal was also a member of India's squad at the 1990 Asian Games in Beijing.

In 2019, he replaced Mahesh Bhupathi as India's Davis Cup captain. Previously he had served as a team selector and is the President of the Delhi Lawn Tennis Association.

== See also ==
- List of India Davis Cup team representatives
