= John Marinov =

Australian tennis player

- Country (sports): Australia

Singles
- Career record: 0–2
- Highest ranking: No. 411 (28 Aug 1989)

Grand Slam singles results
- Australian Open: 1R (1989)
- Wimbledon: Q1 (1989)

Doubles
- Career record: 0–1
- Highest ranking: No. 523 (14 May 1990)

Grand Slam doubles results
- Australian Open: 1R (1989)

John Marinov is an Australian former professional tennis player.

Marinov, who had been a highly ranked junior, started on the professional tour in the late 1980s. Featuring mostly in satellite and Challenger tournaments, he reached a best singles ranking of 411 in the world. In 1989 he made a main draw appearance at the Australian Open, where he lost in the first round to Danie Visser.
