= Sarah Loosemore =

British tennis player

- Country (sports): Great Britain
- Born: 15 June 1971 (age 53); Cardiff, Wales, UK
- Prize money: $116,991

Singles
- Career record: 68–68
- Career titles: 0 WTA / 1 ITF
- Highest ranking: No. 76 (10 September 1990)

Grand Slam singles results
- Australian Open: 3R (1990)
- French Open: 1R (1990, 1991)
- Wimbledon: 2R (1988, 1990)

Doubles
- Career record: 10–18
- Career titles: 0 WTA / 1 ITF
- Highest ranking: No. 211 (29 October 1990)

Grand Slam doubles results
- Australian Open: 1R (1991)
- Wimbledon: 1R (1990, 1991)

Sarah Loosemore (born 15 June 1971) is a retired professional tennis player from Wales.

Loosemore was born in Cardiff to solicitor father John, and physiotherapist and tennis coach mother, Pam. She played on the WTA Tour from the late 1980s until mid 1990s, when she attended university. She was the youngest female British competitor in the main draw at Wimbledon at age 16 in 1988, where she got to the 2nd round. Before that she had played in numerous junior grand slams and won a number of junior National titles. In 1990, she reached the 3rd round of the Australian Open, (beaten by Helena Suková), her best performance in a Grand Slam event. She also defeated Hanna Mandlikova while representing Great Britain in The Hopman Cup. She was British Number 1 for some time and was the youngest winner of the National Championships, aged 17. She represented Great Britain in The Federation Cup and reached a career high WTA World ranking of 76, when she was 19 years of age.

Loosemore left the tennis tour to study at the University of Oxford for a Psychology degree. There she met Chad Lion-Cachet, a Dutch international rugby player and Oxford University rugby captain. Post University, Loosemore qualified and worked as a solicitor, whilst still playing county level tennis. She married Lion-Cachet and had three sons.

== WTA finals ==
=== Singles (1 runners-up) ===
Result	W/L	Date	Tournament	Surface	Opponent	Score
Loss	0–1	Apr 1990	Singapore Open, Singapore	Hard	(Japan) Naoko Sawamatsu	6–7^{(5–7)}, 6–3, 4–6

== ITF finals ==
$25,000 tournaments
$10,000 tournaments

=== Singles (1-1) ===
Result	No.	Date	Tournament	Surface	Opponent	Score
Loss	1.	2 November 1987	Telford, United Kingdom	Hard	(Soviet Union) Natalia Medvedeva	2–6, 2–6
Win	1.	18 August 1991	Virginia Beach, United States	Hard	(United States) Tammy Whittington	6–2, 6–3

=== Doubles (1–0) ===
Result	Date	Tournament	Surface	Partner	Opponents	Score
Win	9 August 1992	College Park, United States	Hard	(Australia) Jane Taylor	(United Kingdom) Michele Mair (South Africa) Karen van der Merwe	6–4, 6–3

== Grand Slams records ==
=== Singles ===
Year	Australia Open		French Open		Wimbledon		US Open
1988	1st round (1/64)	(Netherlands) Hellas Ter Riet	–		2nd round (1/32)	(United States) Terry Phelps	–
1989	2nd round (1/32)	(United States) Pam Shriver	–		–		–
1990	3rd round (1/16)	(Czechoslovakia) Helena Suková	1st round (1/64)	(United States) Jennifer Santrock	2nd round (1/32)	(South Africa) Elna Reinach	–
1991	1st round (1/64)	(Germany) Barbara Rittner	1st round (1/64)	(Germany) C. Kohde-Kilsch	1st round (1/64)	(Czechoslovakia) A. Strnadová	–
1992	–		–		1st round (1/64)	(France) A. Dechaume	–

Final opponent on the right, l'ultime adversaire

=== Doubles ===
Year	Australia Open		French Open	Wimbledon		US Open
1990	–		–	1st round (1/32) (United Kingdom) A Simpkin	(West Germany) C. Porwik (West Germany) W. Probst	–
1991	1st round (1/32) (United States) A Leand	(Australia) L. Stacey (Australia) J Taylor	–	1st round (1/32) (United Kingdom) A. Grunfeld	(United Kingdom) B. Griffiths (United Kingdom) Jane Wood	–

=== Fed Cup ===
She appeared in the Fed Cup in 1990, playing three singles matches and winning two.

== World ranking ==
Year	1987	1988	1989	1990	1991	1992
Ranking	367	▲159	▼298	▲82	▼174	▼430
