= Gabrielle Villiger =

Swiss tennis player

- Full name: Gabrielle Häberli-Villiger
- Country (sports): Switzerland
- Born: 7 June 1971 (age 54)

Singles
- Career record: 21–27
- Highest ranking: No. 358 (19 June 1989)

Doubles
- Career record: 4–10
- Highest ranking: No. 468 (21 December 1986)

Gabrielle Villiger (born 7 June 1971) is a Swiss former professional tennis player. She played college tennis for Anderson College in South Carolina.

Villiger, the younger sister of Federation Cup player Isabelle, represented Switzerland in two ties herself in 1989. She teamed up with Céline Cohen to win a doubles rubber against Belgium and then featured in the opening singles rubber against Indonesia, which she lost to Suzanna Wibowo.

== ITF finals ==
=== Singles: 1 (0–1) ===
Outcome	Date	Tournament	Surface	Opponent	Score
Runner-up	6 November 1988	Lenzerheide, Switzerland	Carpet	(Australia) Kate McDonald	2–6, 1–6

== See also ==
- List of Switzerland Fed Cup team representatives
