= Andrés Alarcón (tennis) =

Ecuadorian tennis player (born 1970)

- Country (sports): Ecuador
- Born: 22 May 1970 (age 55) Quito, Ecuador
- Height: 1.75 m (5 ft 9 in)
- Plays: Right-handed
- Prize money: $10,901

Singles
- Highest ranking: No. 351 (11 Nov 1991)

Grand Slam singles results
- Wimbledon: Q3 (1994)

Doubles
- Highest ranking: No. 372 (15 May 1995)

Andrés Alarcón (born 22 May 1970) is an Ecuadorian former professional tennis player.

Born in Quito, Alarcón competed for the Ecuador Davis Cup team in 1989 and 1990.

Alarcón reached a best singles ranking of 351 on the professional tour and featured in qualifying at the 1994 Wimbledon Championships, where he had wins over Stéphane Sansoni and Vince Spadea.

A coach at the IMG Bollettieri Academy in Florida, Alarcón has coached professional players including Austin Krajicek.

== ATP Challenger finals ==
=== Doubles: 1 (0–1) ===
Result	Date	Tournament	Surface	Partner	Opponents	Score
Loss	Jun 1994	Campinas, Brazil	Clay	(Colombia) Mario Rincón	(Argentina) Patricio Arnold (Argentina) Martin Stringari	1–6, 3–6

== See also ==
- List of Ecuador Davis Cup team representatives
