= Maïder Laval =

French tennis player

- Country (sports): France
- Born: 18 May 1970 (age 54)
- Retired: 1994
- Prize money: $79,223

Singles
- Career record: 87-84
- Career titles: 3 ITF
- Highest ranking: No. 139 (7 January 1991)

Grand Slam singles results
- Australian Open: 1R (1988, 1990)
- French Open: 2R (1987)

Doubles
- Career record: 16-33
- Highest ranking: No. 208 (14 September 1987)

Grand Slam doubles results
- Australian Open: 1R (1988)
- French Open: 2R (1987)

Maïder Laval (born 18 May 1970) is a former professional tennis player from France.

== Biography ==
An under-18s national champion, Laval competed in the women's singles main draw of every French Open from 1987 to 1991. In the first two years she also played in the juniors and was a girls' doubles finalist at the 1988 French Open, partnering Julie Halard.

Laval, who also featured twice at the Australian Open, represented the France Federation Cup team in 1988, for a World Group tie against West Germany. She made her only appearance in the doubles rubber, with Catherine Suire, which they lost in three sets to Isabel Cueto and Eva Pfaff.

During her time on the professional tour she reached a best singles ranking on tour of 139 in the world. She was a quarter-finalist at Bayonne in 1990 and twice reached the quarter-finals at Palermo, in 1990 and 1991. These runs included two wins over players ranked in the world's top-50, Rachel McQuillan in Bayonne and Raffaella Reggi at the 1991 Palermo Open.

== ITF finals ==
=== Singles (3–1) ===
Legend
$25,000 tournaments
$10,000 tournaments

| Outcome | No. | Date | Tournament | Surface | Opponent | Score |
|---|---|---|---|---|---|---|
| Winner | 1. | 29 August 1988 | Corsica, France | Clay | (United Kingdom) Anne Simpkin | 6–2, 6–3 |
| Winner | 2. | 19 June 1989 | Brindisi, Italy | Clay | (New Zealand) Claudine Toleafoa | 4–6, 7–5, 6–1 |
| Runner-up | 3. | 20 September 1993 | Marseille, France | Clay | (Madagascar) Dally Randriantefy | 6–3, 5–7, 4–6 |
| Winner | 4. | 21 March 1994 | Castellón, Spain | Clay | (Spain) Estefania Bottini | 6–4, 7–5 |

=== Doubles (0–1) ===
| Outcome | No. | Date | Tournament | Surface | Partner | Opponents | Score |
|---|---|---|---|---|---|---|---|
| Runner-up | 1. | 7 June 1993 | Oliviera, Portugal | Hard | (France) Peggy Rouquier | (Japan) Nao Akahori (Japan) Shizuka Tokiwa | 7–5, 1–6, 6–7 |
