= Gonzalo Núñez =

Ecuadorian-American tennis player

- Country (sports): Ecuador; United States
- Born: July 21, 1954 (age 70); Guayaquil, Ecuador

Singles
- Career record: 0–2 (Grand Prix circuit)
- Highest ranking: No. 220 (Jan 3, 1979)

Doubles
- Career record: 4–16 (Grand Prix circuit)
- Highest ranking: No. 214 (July 9, 1984)

Gonzalo Núñez (born July 21, 1954) is an Ecuadorian-American former professional tennis player.

Núñez was born in the Ecuadorian city of Guayaquil and moved to the United States in the mid-1970s to live with relatives in New Jersey. He played collegiate tennis for the University of Texas and was the 1975 national amateur grass court champion.

A Davis Cup representative for Ecuador in 1975, Núñez competed on the Grand Prix circuit mostly in doubles tournaments. He won an ATP Challenger doubles title in Barcelona in 1981.

== Challenger titles ==
=== Doubles: (1) ===
No.	Date	Tournament	Surface	Partner	Opponent	Score
1.	September 21, 1981	Layetano, Spain	Clay	(Ecuador) Hugo Núñez	(South Africa) Rory Chappell (United States) John Van Nostrand	6–4, 7–5

== See also ==
- List of Ecuador Davis Cup team representatives
