= 1988 Wimbledon Championships – Women's doubles qualifying =

Women's doubles qualifying
- 1988 Wimbledon Championships

Events
Singles	men	women		boys	girls
Doubles	men	women	mixed	boys	girls
WC Singles	men	women	quad
WC Doubles	men	women	quad
Legends	men	women	seniors

Qualification
Singles	men	women
Doubles	men	women	mixed
- Wimbledon Championships

Players and pairs who neither have high enough rankings nor receive wild cards may participate in a qualifying tournament held one week before the annual Wimbledon Tennis Championships.

== Qualifiers ==
1. (Australia) Louise Field / (Switzerland) Eva Krapl
2. (France) Alexia Dechaume / (France) Emmanuelle Derly
3. (Australia) Jo-Anne Faull / (Australia) Rachel McQuillan
4. (Japan) Yukie Koizumi / (United States) Kim Steinmetz

== Lucky losers ==
1. (United States) Ann Grossman / (Japan) Masako Yanagi
2. (Australia) Lisa O'Neill / (United States) Jill Smoller

== Qualifying draw ==
=== First qualifier ===
First round
(Australia) Louise Field (Switzerland) Eva Krapl	6	6
(United Kingdom) Katie Rickett (United Kingdom) Sally Timms	1	1
(United Kingdom) Amanda Grunfeld (United Kingdom) Jo Louis	6	3	5
(South Africa) Linda Barnard (United States) Jamie Golder	2	6	7
(United Kingdom) Teresa Catlin (United Kingdom) Jane Wood	7	2	3
(United States) Ann Grossman (Japan) Masako Yanagi	5	6	6
(Republic of Ireland) Lesley O'Halloran (Republic of Ireland) Philippa Palmer	0	6	2
(United States) Lindsay Bartlett (United States) Stephanie Savides	6	3	6

Second round
(Australia) Louise Field (Switzerland) Eva Krapl	7^{7}	3	6
(South Africa) Linda Barnard (United States) Jamie Golder	6^{4}	6	0
(United States) Ann Grossman (Japan) Masako Yanagi	6	7^{7}
(United States) Lindsay Bartlett (United States) Stephanie Savides	4	6^{2}

Qualifying competition
(Australia) Louise Field (Switzerland) Eva Krapl	7^{8}	6
(United States) Ann Grossman (Japan) Masako Yanagi	6^{6}	5

=== Second qualifier ===
First round
(France) Alexia Dechaume (France) Emmanuelle Derly	6	6
(United Kingdom) Lisa Gould (Australia) Sally McCann	1	3
(United Kingdom) Kaye Hand (United Kingdom) Sarah Sullivan	5	2
(Australia) Tracey Morton (Australia) Lisa Weerasekera	7	6
(France) Maïder Laval (France) Karine Quentrec	7	6
(United Kingdom) Caroline Billingham (United Kingdom) Karen Hunter	5	2
(United Kingdom) Belinda Borneo (United Kingdom) Alison Fleming	5
(Czechoslovakia) Denisa Krajčovičová (Czechoslovakia) Jana Pospíšilová	2^{r}

Second round
(France) Alexia Dechaume (France) Emmanuelle Derly	6	6
(Australia) Tracey Morton (Australia) Lisa Weerasekera	2	4
(France) Maïder Laval (France) Karine Quentrec
(United Kingdom) Belinda Borneo (United Kingdom) Alison Fleming	w/o

Qualifying competition
(France) Alexia Dechaume (France) Emmanuelle Derly	6	6
(France) Maïder Laval (France) Karine Quentrec	2	3

=== Third qualifier ===
First round
(United States) Kathy Foxworth (United States) Tammy Whittington	6	7
Miss Van Bevran (Hungary) Réka Szikszay	4	5
(Australia) Jo-Anne Faull (Australia) Rachel McQuillan	6	7
(South Africa) Amanda Coetzer (South Africa) Rikki Gaddie	1	5
(United Kingdom) Jackie Holden (United Kingdom) Claire Pollard	6^{6}	6	4
(United States) Elizabeth Galphin (United States) Tina Mochizuki	7^{8}	4	6
(United Kingdom) Monique Javer (United Kingdom) Sarah Loosemore	1	4
(Australia) Elizabeth Minter (United States) Jane Thomas	6	6

Second round
(United States) Kathy Foxworth (United States) Tammy Whittington	1	3
(Australia) Jo-Anne Faull (Australia) Rachel McQuillan	6	6
(United States) Elizabeth Galphin (United States) Tina Mochizuki	5	7^{7}	7
(Australia) Elizabeth Minter (United States) Jane Thomas	7	6^{4}	5

Qualifying competition
(Australia) Jo-Anne Faull (Australia) Rachel McQuillan	6	6
(United States) Elizabeth Galphin (United States) Tina Mochizuki	1	4

=== Fourth qualifier ===
First round
(Japan) Yukie Koizumi (United States) Kim Steinmetz	6	3	7
(United States) Halle Cioffi (United States) Shaun Stafford	4	6	5
(United Kingdom) Glynis Coles (United Kingdom) Denise Parnell	2	4
(United States) Donna Faber (United States) Jeri Ingram	6	6
(United States) Robin Khan (United Kingdom) Summer Yardley	6	6
Miss Bezerra (United Kingdom) Alison Hill	2	4
(Japan) Ei Iida (Australia) Clare Thompson	6	1	4
(Australia) Lisa O'Neill (United States) Jill Smoller	3	6	6

Second round
(Japan) Yukie Koizumi (United States) Kim Steinmetz	6	6
(United States) Donna Faber (United States) Jeri Ingram	1	2
(United States) Robin Khan (United Kingdom) Summer Yardley	0	1
(Australia) Lisa O'Neill (United States) Jill Smoller	6	6

Qualifying competition
(Japan) Yukie Koizumi (United States) Kim Steinmetz	6	6
(Australia) Lisa O'Neill (United States) Jill Smoller	3	4
