= 1988 Wimbledon Championships – Women's singles qualifying =

Women's singles qualifying
- 1988 Wimbledon Championships

Events
Singles	men	women		boys	girls
Doubles	men	women	mixed	boys	girls
WC Singles	men	women	quad
WC Doubles	men	women	quad
Legends	men	women	seniors

Qualification
Singles	men	women
Doubles	men	women	mixed
- Wimbledon Championships

Players and pairs who neither have high enough rankings nor receive wild cards may participate in a qualifying tournament held one week before the annual Wimbledon Tennis Championships.

== Seeds ==
1. (France) Emmanuelle Derly (first round)
2. (West Germany) Sabine Auer (first round)
3. (United States) Donna Faber (second round)
4. (Czechoslovakia) Jana Pospíšilová (second round)
5. (Italy) Cathy Caverzasio (first round)
6. (West Germany) Veronika Martinek (first round)
7. (Japan) Kumiko Okamoto (qualified)
8. (United States) Anna-Maria Fernandez (first round)
9. (Peru) Pilar Vásquez (first round)
10. (United States) Penny Barg (qualified)
11. (United States) Cammy MacGregor (first round)
12. (United States) Ronni Reis (qualified)
13. (New Zealand) Julie Richardson (first round)
14. (Australia) Louise Field (qualified)
15. (Australia) Lisa O'Neill (qualifying competition, Lucky loser)
16. (United States) Tina Mochizuki (first round)

== Qualifiers ==
1. (United States) Ronni Reis
2. (United States) Penny Barg
3. (South Africa) Lise Gregory
4. (Australia) Jo-Anne Faull
5. (United Kingdom) Karen Hunter
6. (Australia) Louise Field
7. (Japan) Kumiko Okamoto
8. (United States) Sandy Collins

== Lucky losers ==
1. (Australia) Lisa O'Neill
2. (France) Karine Quentrec
3. (United States) Shaun Stafford

== Qualifying draw ==
=== First qualifier ===
First round
1	(France) Emmanuelle Derly	4	4
(Netherlands) Carin Bakkum	6	6
(Australia) Alison Scott	7^{7}	2	7
(United States) Paula Smith	6^{2}	6	5
(Australia) Sally McCann	1	6	6
(Soviet Union) Natalia Medvedeva	6	3	4
WC	(United Kingdom) Joy Tacon	3	6^{3}
12	(United States) Ronni Reis	6	7^{7}

Second round
(Netherlands) Carin Bakkum	2	4
(Australia) Alison Scott	6	6
(Australia) Sally McCann	2	0
12	(United States) Ronni Reis	6	6

Qualifying competition
(Australia) Alison Scott	6^{6}	1
12	(United States) Ronni Reis	7^{8}	6

=== Second qualifier ===
First round
10	(United States) Penny Barg	7	4	6
WC	(United Kingdom) Belinda Borneo	5	6	3
(United States) Pamela Jung	2	4
(United States) Jamie Golder	6	6
(United States) Jane Thomas	6	6
(United States) Stephanie Savides	4	2
(West Germany) Andrea Betzner	7^{12}	6
5	(Italy) Cathy Caverzasio	6^{10}	4

Second round
10	(United States) Penny Barg	6	6
(United States) Jamie Golder	3	4
(United States) Jane Thomas	6	6
(West Germany) Andrea Betzner	3	3

Qualifying competition
10	(United States) Penny Barg	6^{3}	6	6
(United States) Jane Thomas	7^{7}	4	4

=== Third qualifier ===
First round
3	(United States) Donna Faber	1	6	6
(Japan) Ei Iida	6	4	2
(United States) Kathy Foxworth	3	2
(South Africa) Lise Gregory	6	6
(South Africa) Linda Barnard	6	6
(Japan) Rika Hiraki	0	2
(Italy) Silvia La Fratta	1	6^{4}
15	(Australia) Lisa O'Neill	6	7^{7}

Second round
3	(United States) Donna Faber	6	6^{4}	4
(South Africa) Lise Gregory	1	7^{7}	6
(South Africa) Linda Barnard	5	6	7
15	(Australia) Lisa O'Neill	7	2	9

Qualifying competition
(South Africa) Lise Gregory	6^{10}	6	6
15	(Australia) Lisa O'Neill	7^{12}	0	4

=== Fourth qualifier ===
First round
13	(New Zealand) Julie Richardson	2	1
(Japan) Yukie Koizumi	6	6
(United Kingdom) Sally Timms	4	5
(United States) Jeri Ingram	6	7
(United Kingdom) Jane Wood	1	3
(Japan) Miki Mizokuchi	6	6
(Australia) Jo-Anne Faull	6	6
8	(United States) Anna-Maria Fernandez	2	2

Second round
(Japan) Yukie Koizumi	6	6
(United States) Jeri Ingram	0	0
(Japan) Miki Mizokuchi	2	3
(Australia) Jo-Anne Faull	6	6

Qualifying competition
(Japan) Yukie Koizumi	7^{7}	2	3
(Australia) Jo-Anne Faull	6^{3}	6	6

=== Fifth qualifier ===
First round
6	(West Germany) Veronika Martinek	1	7^{7}	3
WC	(United Kingdom) Karen Hunter	6	6^{4}	6
(Australia) Rachel McQuillan	6	5	3
WC	(United Kingdom) Sam Smith	1	7	6
(Czechoslovakia) Denisa Krajčovičová	6	7^{8}
(Austria) Heidi Sprung	3	6^{6}
(France) Karine Quentrec	6	6
9	(Peru) Pilar Vásquez	2	4

Second round
WC	(United Kingdom) Karen Hunter	6	3	6
WC	(United Kingdom) Sam Smith	1	6	2
(Czechoslovakia) Denisa Krajčovičová	3	2
(France) Karine Quentrec	6	6

Qualifying competition
WC	(United Kingdom) Karen Hunter	6	6
(France) Karine Quentrec	3	1

=== Sixth qualifier ===
First round
14	(Australia) Louise Field	7^{7}	6
(United States) Tammy Whittington	6^{2}	2
(United States) Molly Van Nostrand	6	6
(Australia) Tracey Morton	3	2
(United States) Cynthia MacGregor	6	6
(United States) Elizabeth Galphin	1	2
(United States) Candy Reynolds	6	1	4
4	(Czechoslovakia) Jana Pospíšilová	1	6	6

Second round
14	(Australia) Louise Field	6	6
(United States) Molly Van Nostrand	3	2
(United States) Cynthia MacGregor	7^{7}	6
4	(Czechoslovakia) Jana Pospíšilová	6^{3}	3

Qualifying competition
14	(Australia) Louise Field	7	6
(United States) Cynthia MacGregor	5	3

=== Seventh qualifier ===
First round
7	(Japan) Kumiko Okamoto	6	7
(South Africa) Rikki Gaddie	3	5
(United States) Kim Steinmetz	6	6
(United Kingdom) Sally Godman	3	3
(Hong Kong) Patricia Hy	1	2
(United States) Wendy Wood	6	6
(United States) Shaun Stafford	6	6
16	(United States) Tina Mochizuki	3	3

Second round
7	(Japan) Kumiko Okamoto	3	6	6
(United States) Kim Steinmetz	6	3	1
(United States) Wendy Wood	6	0	2
(United States) Shaun Stafford	3	6	6

Qualifying competition
7	(Japan) Kumiko Okamoto	6	6
(United States) Shaun Stafford	3	4

=== Eighth qualifier ===
First round
11	(United States) Cammy MacGregor	6^{7}	4
WC	(United Kingdom) Sarah Sullivan	7^{9}	6
(United States) Jenni Goodling	7^{8}	3	3
(South Africa) Amanda Coetzer	6^{6}	6	6
(United States) Sandy Collins	6	6
(Australia) Susan Leo	1	3
(United States) Lindsay Bartlett	6	6
2	(West Germany) Sabine Auer	3	2

Second round
(United Kingdom) Sarah Sullivan	4	3
(South Africa) Amanda Coetzer	6	6
(United States) Sandy Collins	6	6
(United States) Lindsay Bartlett	1	0

Qualifying competition
(South Africa) Amanda Coetzer	4	3
(United States) Sandy Collins	6	6
