= 1988 Australian Open – Women's doubles =

Women's doubles
- 1988 Australian Open
- 1987 Champions: (United States) Martina Navratilova (United States) Pam Shriver

Final
- Champions: (United States) Martina Navratilova (United States) Pam Shriver
- Runners-up: (United States) Chris Evert (Australia) Wendy Turnbull
- Score: 6–0, 7–5

Details
- Draw: 64
- Seeds: 16

Events
Singles	men	women		boys	girls
Doubles	men	women	mixed	boys	girls
WC Singles	men	women	quad
WC Doubles	men	women	quad
Legends	men	women	mixed
- Australian Open

Five-time defending champions Martina Navratilova and Pam Shriver successfully defended their title, defeating Chris Evert and Wendy Turnbull in the final 6–0, 7–5 to win the women's doubles tennis title at the 1988 Australian Open.

== Seeds ==
Champion seeds are indicated in bold text while text in italics indicates the round in which those seeds were eliminated.

1. (United States) **Martina Navratilova** / (United States) **Pam Shriver (champions)**
2. n/a
3. n/a
4. (West Germany) Steffi Graf / (Australia) Elizabeth Smylie (semifinals)
5. (United States) Zina Garrison / (United States) Barbara Potter (semifinals)
6. (Australia) Hana Mandlíková / (Czechoslovakia) Jana Novotná (quarterfinals)
7. (United States) Chris Evert / (Australia) Wendy Turnbull (final)
8. (South Africa) Rosalyn Fairbank / (United States) Candy Reynolds (first round)
9. (Australia) Jenny Byrne / (Australia) Janine Tremelling (third round)
10. (Sweden) Catarina Lindqvist / (United States) Robin White (third round)
11. (France) Catherine Suire / (France) Catherine Tanvier (third round)
12. (United Kingdom) Jo Durie / (United States) Sharon Walsh-Pete (first round)
13. (Hong Kong) Patricia Hy / (Japan) Etsuko Inoue (third round)
14. (Australia) Michelle Jaggard / (Netherlands) Marcella Mesker (third round)
15. (United States) Ann Henricksson / (Switzerland) Christiane Jolissaint (third round)
16. (New Zealand) Belinda Cordwell / (New Zealand) Julie Richardson (second round)

== Draw ==
Key

- Q = Qualifier
- WC = Wild card
- LL = Lucky loser
- Alt = Alternate
- ITF = ITF entry
- PR = Protected ranking
- SR = Special ranking
- SE = Special exempt
- JE = Junior exempt
- JR = Junior Accelerator Programme entrant
- CO = College Accelerator Programme entrant
- NG = Next Gen Accelerator Program entrant
- w/o = Walkover
- r = Retired
- d = Defaulted

=== Finals ===
Semifinals
1	(United States) **Martina Navratilova** (United States) **Pam Shriver**	**6**	**6**
4	(West Germany) Steffi Graf (Australia) Elizabeth Smylie	4	4
5	(United States) Zina Garrison (United States) Barbara Potter	4	**7^{7}**	3
7	(United States) **Chris Evert** (Australia) **Wendy Turnbull**	**6**	6^{5}	**6**

Final
1	(United States) **Martina Navratilova** (United States) **Pam Shriver**	**6**	**7**
7	(United States) Chris Evert (Australia) Wendy Turnbull	0	5

=== Top half ===
==== Section 1 ====
First round
1	(United States) **M Navratilova** (United States) **P Shriver**	**6**	**6**
(United Kingdom) J Salmon (Japan) M Yanagi	3	1
(United States) B Bowes (Czechoslovakia) R Zrubáková	**7^{7}**	1	4
(United States) **P Fendick** (Canada) **J Hetherington**	6^{5}	**6**	**6**
(Switzerland) **C Cohen** (Greece) **O Tsarbopoulou**	**6**	6^{2}	**6**
(Israel) I Berger (United States) P Casale	1	**7^{7}**	0
(Netherlands) N Jagerman (United States) J Kaplan	1	0
11	(France) **C Suire** (France) **C Tanvier**	**6**	**6**
9	(Australia) **J Byrne** (Australia) **J Tremelling**	**6**	**6**
(United States) V Nelson-Dunbar (United States) K Steinmetz	1	4
(Netherlands) **B Schultz** (Netherlands) **H ter Riet**	**6**	4	**7**
(United States) Ca MacGregor (United States) Cy MacGregor	3	**6**	5
(West Germany) **C Porwik** (West Germany) **W Probst**	3	**7**	**6**
(Australia) D Balestrat (Australia) N Provis	**6**	5	4
WC	(Australia) K Deed (Australia) C Thompson	1	0
6	(Australia) **H Mandlíková** (Czechoslovakia) **J Novotná**	**6**	**6**

Second round
1	(United States) **M Navratilova** (United States) **P Shriver**	**7^{7}**	**7**
(United States) P Fendick (Canada) J Hetherington	6^{4}	5
(Switzerland) C Cohen (Greece) O Tsarbopoulou	1	1
11	(France) **C Suire** (France) **C Tanvier**	**6**	**6**
9	(Australia) **J Byrne** (Australia) **J Tremelling**	**6**	**6**
(Netherlands) B Schultz (Netherlands) H ter Riet	2	2
(West Germany) C Porwik (West Germany) W Probst	6^{10}	3
6	(Australia) **H Mandlíková** (Czechoslovakia) **J Novotná**	**7^{12}**	**6**

Third round
1	(United States) **M Navratilova** (United States) **P Shriver**	**6**	**7**
11	(France) C Suire (France) C Tanvier	3	5
9	(Australia) J Byrne (Australia) J Tremelling	6^{3}	**6**	5
6	(Australia) **H Mandlíková** (Czechoslovakia) **J Novotná**	**7^{7}**	4	**7**

Quarterfinals
1	(United States) **M Navratilova** (United States) **P Shriver**	**6**	**7^{7}**
6	(Australia) H Mandlíková (Czechoslovakia) J Novotná	0	6^{3}

==== Section 2 ====
First round
4	(West Germany) **S Graf** (Australia) **E Smylie**	**6**	**6**
(United States) A M Fernandez (Australia) L Field	1	0
(Belgium) **A Devries** (Switzerland) **E Krapl**	**6**	**6**
(United States) L-A Eldredge (United States) M Werdel	4	1
(Australia) **Bi Potter** (Australia) **K Radford**	**7^{7}**	**6**
(United States) J Golder (United States) S Norris	6^{5}	1
WC	(Australia) J-A Faull (Australia) R McQuillan	**6**	4	4
13	(Hong Kong) **P Hy** (Japan) **E Inoue**	3	**6**	**5**
14	(Australia) **M Jaggard** (Netherlands) **M Mesker**	**6**	**6**
(Netherlands) C Bakkum (Australia) L O'Neill	1	2
(United States) T Mochizuki (Peru) P Vásquez	3	2
(Japan) **A Kijimuta** (Hong Kong) **P Moreno**	**6**	**6**
(United Kingdom) **S Gomer** (Netherlands) **M van der Torre**	**6**	**6**
(United States) C Christian (United States) A Frazier	3	4
(Netherlands) **M Bollegraf** (United States) **S Collins**	**7^{7}**	3	**6**
8	(South Africa) R Fairbank (United States) C Reynolds	6^{3}	**6**	3

Second round
4	(West Germany) **S Graf** (Australia) **E Smylie**	**6**	**6**
(Belgium) A Devries (Switzerland) E Krapl	1	4
(Australia) Bi Potter (Australia) K Radford	4	0
13	(Hong Kong) **P Hy** (Japan) **E Inoue**	**6**	**6**
14	(Australia) **M Jaggard** (Netherlands) **M Mesker**	2	**6**	**6**
(Japan) A Kijimuta (Hong Kong) P Moreno	**6**	0	0
(United Kingdom) S Gomer (Netherlands) M van der Torre	2	0
(Netherlands) **M Bollegraf** (United States) **S Collins**	**6**	**6**

Third round
4	(West Germany) **S Graf** (Australia) **E Smylie**	3	**6**	**7**
13	(Hong Kong) P Hy (Japan) E Inoue	**6**	2	5
14	(Australia) M Jaggard (Netherlands) M Mesker	2	1
(Netherlands) **M Bollegraf** (United States) **S Collins**	**6**	**6**

Quarterfinals
4	(West Germany) **S Graf** (Australia) **E Smylie**	**6**	**6**
(Netherlands) M Bollegraf (United States) S Collins	1	1

=== Bottom half ===
==== Section 3 ====
First round
5	(United States) **Z Garrison** (United States) **Ba Potter**	**6**	**6**
(France) J Halard (France) P Paradis	3	2
(United States) A Schwartz (Australia) A Tobin-Dingwall	**6**	4	3
ALT	(Sweden) **H Dahlström** (Norway) **A Jonsson-Raaholt**	2	**6**	**6**
(United States) L Antonoplis (Australia) A Minter	4	**6**	4
(Australia) **R Lamb** (United States) **J Smoller**	**6**	1	**6**
WC	(Australia) M Bowrey (Australia) S McCann	4	2
15	(United States) **A Henricksson** (Switzerland) **C Jolissaint**	**6**	**6**
12	(United Kingdom) J Durie (United States) S Walsh-Pete	**6**	2	3
(Sweden) **M Lindström** (Australia) **A Scott**	3	**6**	**6**
WC	(Australia) X Adams (Australia) K Staunton	3	1
(Japan) **K Okamoto** (Japan) **N Sato**	**6**	**6**
(United States) **J Goodling** (United States) **W Wood**	**6**	**6**
(United States) J Fuchs (United States) J Thomas	3	2
(Austria) **H Sprung** (Belgium) **S Wasserman**	**6**	**6**
ALT	(United States) J Blackstad (United States) E Galphin	3	2

Second round
5	(United States) **Z Garrison** (United States) **Ba Potter**	**6**	**6**
(Sweden) H Dahlström (Norway) A Jonsson	3	2
(Australia) R Lamb (United States) J Smoller	4	3
15	(United States) **A Henricksson** (Switzerland) **C Jolissaint**	**6**	**6**
(Sweden) **M Lindström** (Australia) **A Scott**	**7^{7}**	**7^{7}**
(Japan) K Okamoto (Japan) N Sato	6^{2}	6^{2}
(United States) **J Goodling** (United States) **W Wood**	**7^{7}**	**6**
(Austria) H Sprung (Belgium) S Wasserman	6^{5}	2

Third round
5	(United States) **Z Garrison** (United States) **Ba Potter**	**7^{7}**	**6**
15	(United States) A Henricksson (Switzerland) C Jolissaint	6^{4}	1
(Sweden) **M Lindström** (Australia) **A Scott**	**6**	**6**
(United States) J Goodling (United States) W Wood	3	0

Quarterfinals
5	(United States) **Z Garrison** (United States) **Ba Potter**	**6**	**6**
(Sweden) M Lindström (Australia) A Scott	2	2

==== Section 4 ====
First round
7	(United States) **C Evert** (Australia) **W Turnbull**	**6**	**6**
(France) E Derly (France) M Laval	4	1
(United States) L Bartlett (United States) S Savides	**7**	3	2
(United States) **D-A Hansel** (United States) **P Smith**	5	**6**	**6**
(Australia) T Morton (Australia) L Weerasekera	2	1
(United States) **K Adams** (United States) **P Barg**	**6**	**6**
(Japan) K Ito (Japan) E Okagawa	0	1
16	(New Zealand) **B Cordwell** (New Zealand) **J Richardson**	**6**	**6**
10	(Sweden) **C Lindqvist** (United States) **R White**	6^{4}	**6**	**6**
(United States) H Ludloff (Australia) E Minter	**7^{7}**	2	4
(Japan) **E Iida** (Japan) **A Nishiya**	2	**7**	**6**
(United Kingdom) V Lake (United Kingdom) C Wood	**6**	5	3
(Japan) Y Koizumi (Australia) J Masters	4	5
(Australia) **K McDonald** (United States) **E Smith**	**6**	**7**
(United States) **C Benjamin** (United States) **G Magers**	**6**	**6**
ALT	(United Kingdom) A Grunfeld (United Kingdom) K Rickett	1	1

Second round
7	(United States) **C Evert** (Australia) **W Turnbull**	4	**6**	**6**
(United States) D-A Hansel (United States) P Smith	**6**	0	1
(United States) **K Adams** (United States) **P Barg**	**6**	**6**
16	(New Zealand) B Cordwell (New Zealand) J Richardson	3	3
10	(Sweden) **C Lindqvist** (United States) **R White**	4	**6**	**6**
(Japan) E Iida (Japan) A Nishiya	**6**	2	0
(Australia) K McDonald (United States) E Smith	1	**7**	8
(United States) **C Benjamin** (United States) **G Magers**	**6**	5	**10**

Third round
7	(United States) **C Evert** (Australia) **W Turnbull**	**6**	**6**
(United States) K Adams (United States) P Barg	1	1
10	(Sweden) C Lindqvist (United States) R White	**6**	6^{5}	4
(United States) **C Benjamin** (United States) **G Magers**	4	**7^{7}**	**6**

Quarterfinals
7	(United States) **C Evert** (Australia) **W Turnbull**	**7^{7}**	**6**
(United States) C Benjamin (United States) G Magers	6^{4}	1
