= 1988 Australian Open – Women's singles =

Women's singles
- 1988 Australian Open

Final
- Champion: (Germany) Steffi Graf
- Runner-up: (United States) Chris Evert
- Score: 6–1, 7–6^{(7–3)}

Details
- Draw: 128
- Seeds: 16

Events
Singles	men	women		boys	girls
Doubles	men	women	mixed	boys	girls
WC Singles	men	women	quad
WC Doubles	men	women	quad
Legends	men	women	mixed
- Australian Open

Steffi Graf defeated Chris Evert in the final, 6–1, 7–6^{(7–3)} to win the women's singles tennis title at the 1988 Australian Open. It was her first Australian Open title, her second major title overall, and her first step towards completing the first, and so far only Golden Slam in the history of pedestrian tennis. Graf did not lose a set during the tournament. This was the first major final played under a roof; there was a 1-hour and 23-minute delay to close the roof at 1–1 in the first set.

Hana Mandlíková was the defending champion, but was defeated by Graf in the quarterfinals.

This tournament marked Evert's 34th (and last) appearance in a major singles final, an all-time record in women's singles. It was also her sixth Australian Open final in as many appearances at the event.

Martina Navratilova's streak of eleven consecutive major final appearances ended (starting from the 1985 French Open) when she lost to Evert in the semifinals.

This was the first edition of the tournament to be held on hardcourts, having previously been played on grass. It was also the first edition of the tournament to feature a 128-player draw, in line with the other three majors.

== Seeds ==
1. (West Germany) Steffi Graf (champion)
2. (United States) Martina Navratilova (semifinals)
3. (United States) Chris Evert (final)
4. (United States) Pam Shriver (fourth round)
5. (Australia) Hana Mandlíková (quarterfinals)
6. (Czechoslovakia) Helena Suková (quarterfinals)
7. (United States) Zina Garrison (second round)
8. (West Germany) Claudia Kohde-Kilsch (semifinals)
9. (United States) Lori McNeil (fourth round)
10. (United States) Barbara Potter (fourth round)
11. (West Germany) Sylvia Hanika (fourth round)
12. (West Germany) Bettina Bunge (withdrew due to knee injury)
13. (Sweden) Catarina Lindqvist (fourth round)
14. (Australia) Dianne Balestrat (first round)
15. (Australia) Wendy Turnbull (withdrew)
16. (Australia) Elizabeth Smylie (first round)

Bunge's position in the draw was taken over by lucky loser, Katie Rickett; Turnbull was replaced by lucky loser Jill Smoller

== Draw ==
Key

- Q = Qualifier
- WC = Wild card
- LL = Lucky loser
- Alt = Alternate
- ITF = ITF entry
- PR = Protected ranking
- SR = Special ranking
- SE = Special exempt
- JE = Junior exempt
- JR = Junior Accelerator Programme entrant
- CO = College Accelerator Programme entrant
- NG = Next Gen Accelerator Program entrant
- w/o = Walkover
- r = Retired
- d = Defaulted

=== Finals ===
Quarterfinals
1	(West Germany) Steffi Graf	6	6
5	(Australia) Hana Mandlíková	2	2
(Australia) Anne Minter	2	4
8	(West Germany) Claudia Kohde-Kilsch	6	6
(West Germany) Claudia Porwik	3	1
3	(United States) Chris Evert	6	6
6	(Czechoslovakia) Helena Suková	4	6^{3}
2	(United States) Martina Navratilova	6	7^{7}

Semifinals
1	(West Germany) Steffi Graf	6	6
8	(West Germany) Claudia Kohde-Kilsch	2	3
3	(United States) Chris Evert	6	7
2	(United States) Martina Navratilova	2	5

Final
1	(West Germany) Steffi Graf	6	7^{7}
3	(United States) Chris Evert	1	6^{3}

=== Top half ===
==== Section 1 ====
First round
1	(West Germany) S Graf	6	6
(Norway) A Jonsson	3	1
WC	(Australia) C Thompson	0	6	4
(Australia) J Tremelling	6	4	6
Q	(United States) P Jung	3	6	3
(United Kingdom) M Javer	6	4	6
(United States) S Walsh-Pete	0	0
(United States) Ca MacGregor	6	6
(United States) R White	7^{7}	6
WC	(Australia) R McQuillan	6^{3}	3
(United States) K Steinmetz	4	7^{8}	3
Q	(United States) L Bartlett	6	6^{6}	6
(United States) A Henricksson	4	6	10
(United States) B Nagelsen	6	1	8
Q	(United States) J Fuchs	4	1
13	(Sweden) C Lindqvist	6	6

Second round
1	(West Germany) S Graf	6	6
(Australia) J Tremelling	0	1
(United Kingdom) M Javer	4	4
(United States) Ca MacGregor	6	6
(United States) R White	6	6
Q	(United States) L Bartlett	1	3
(United States) A Henricksson	2	2
13	(Sweden) C Lindqvist	6	6

Third round
1	(West Germany) S Graf	6	6
(United States) Ca MacGregor	1	2
(United States) R White	1	4
13	(Sweden) C Lindqvist	6	6

Fourth round
1	(West Germany) S Graf	6	7
13	(Sweden) C Lindqvist	0	5

==== Section 2 ====
First round
9	(United States) L McNeil	6	6
(United States) D-A Hansel	2	1
WC	(Australia) X Adams	0	2
(Netherlands) M Bollegraf	6	6
LL	(Hong Kong) P Moreno	6	6
(Netherlands) M van der Torre	3	2
(Australia) J Byrne	6	6^{3}	6
(France) S Niox-Château	4	7^{7}	1
WC	(Australia) M Bowrey	2	0
(France) C Tanvier	6	6
(United Kingdom) J Salmon	4	2
(United Kingdom) J Durie	6	6
Q	(United Kingdom) S Loosemore	4	6^{6}
(Netherlands) H ter Riet	6	7^{8}
(Socialist Federal Republic of Yugoslavia) M Jaušovec	4	1
5	(Australia) H Mandlíková	6	6

Second round
9	(United States) L McNeil	6	6
(Netherlands) M Bollegraf	4	0
LL	(Hong Kong) P Moreno	2	7^{7}	4
(Australia) J Byrne	6	6^{5}	6
(France) C Tanvier	4	6	6
(United Kingdom) J Durie	6	3	3
(Netherlands) H ter Riet	1	1
5	(Australia) H Mandlíková	6	6

Third round
9	(United States) L McNeil	6	6
(Australia) J Byrne	4	2
(France) C Tanvier	4	3
5	(Australia) H Mandlíková	6	6

Fourth round
9	(United States) L McNeil	2	4
5	(Australia) H Mandlíková	6	6

==== Section 3 ====
First round
4	(United States) P Shriver	6	6
(West Germany) E Pfaff	1	3
(South Africa) R Fairbank	6	6
(Japan) Y Koizumi	2	0
(Japan) M Yanagi	1	1
(France) J Halard	6	6
(Australia) A Tobin-Dingwall	2	5
(Netherlands) N Jagerman	6	7
(Australia) L O'Neill	2	6	8
(Greece) O Tsarbopoulou	6	2	6
WC	(Australia) K Deed	3	1
(Australia) A Minter	6	6
Q	(United States) J Goodling	3	0
(United States) C Christian	6	6
(France) M-C Damas	6	6
LL	(United Kingdom) K Rickett	3	0

Second round
4	(United States) P Shriver	7	6
(South Africa) R Fairbank	5	0
(France) J Halard	1	5
(Netherlands) N Jagerman	6	7
(Australia) L O'Neill	2	4
(Australia) A Minter	6	6
(United States) C Christian	6	6
(France) M-C Damas	2	4

Third round
4	(United States) P Shriver	6	6
(Netherlands) N Jagerman	3	3
(Australia) A Minter	6	6
(United States) C Christian	1	4

Fourth round
4	(United States) P Shriver	2	4
(Australia) A Minter	6	6

==== Section 4 ====
First round
LL	(United States) J Smoller	6^{1}	0
(Czechoslovakia) R Zrubáková	7^{7}	6
(United States) P Smith	5	2
(United States) E Galphin	7	6
(France) M Laval	6^{4}	0
(Japan) E Okagawa	7^{7}	6
(United States) C Reynolds	6	7^{7}
(France) M-C Calleja	0	6^{5}
(United States) P Casale	3	0
(United States) M Brown	6	6
WC	(Australia) A Scott	6	1	4
(Australia) M Jaggard	3	6	6
WC	(Australia) J-A Faull	6	7^{7}
(United States) S Mascarin	2	6^{4}
(West Germany) W Probst	6	2	0
8	(West Germany) C Kohde-Kilsch	3	6	6

Second round
(Czechoslovakia) R Zrubáková	6	6
(United States) E Galphin	1	1
(Japan) E Okagawa	6	6
(United States) C Reynolds	4	4
(United States) M Brown	6^{1}	6	6
(Australia) M Jaggard	7^{7}	4	1
WC	(Australia) J-A Faull	2	4
8	(West Germany) C Kohde-Kilsch	6	6

Third round
(Czechoslovakia) R Zrubáková	6	6
(Japan) E Okagawa	0	0
(United States) M Brown	2	1
8	(West Germany) C Kohde-Kilsch	6	6

Fourth round
(Czechoslovakia) R Zrubáková	6	0	3
8	(West Germany) C Kohde-Kilsch	3	6	6

=== Bottom half ===
==== Section 5 ====
First round
7	(United States) Z Garrison	6	6
(Australia) S Faulkner	0	0
(United States) A Frazier	6	2	2
(Switzerland) E Krapl	3	6	6
(United States) V Nelson-Dunbar	4	2
(West Germany) C Porwik	6	6
(Canada) P Hy	6^{1}	2
(United States) Cy MacGregor	7^{7}	6
(Japan) A Nishiya	6	7
(France) P Paradis	4	5
(Japan) E Inoue	7^{7}	6
(Czechoslovakia) J Novotná	6^{4}	4
(United States) A Schwartz	6	6
LL	(United States) S Norris	1	2
(United Kingdom) C Wood	3	6^{6}
10	(United States) B Potter	6	7^{8}

Second round
7	(United States) Z Garrison	6	3	4
(Switzerland) E Krapl	3	6	6
(West Germany) C Porwik	4	6	13
(United States) Cy MacGregor	6	2	11
(Japan) A Nishiya	1	2
(Japan) E Inoue	6	6
(United States) A Schwartz	3	1
10	(United States) B Potter	6	6

Third round
(Switzerland) E Krapl	2	6^{3}
(West Germany) C Porwik	6	7^{7}
(Japan) E Inoue	3	2
10	(United States) B Potter	6	6

Fourth round
(West Germany) C Porwik	7^{7}	7
10	(United States) B Potter	6^{3}	5

==== Section 6 ====
First round
16	(Australia) E Smylie	1	3
(United States) H Ludloff	6	6
(United States) L Antonoplis	6	7^{7}
(United Kingdom) A Croft	4	6^{4}
(Canada) J Hetherington	2	6	1
(Switzerland) C Cohen	6	1	6
(France) C Suire	4	6	7
Q	(Japan) E Iida	6	1	5
LL	(United States) S Savides	3	1
(Belgium) S Wasserman	6	6
(United States) P Fendick	7^{7}	7
(United States) P Barg	6^{5}	5
(United States) T Mochizuki	4	6	4
(United States) B Bowes	6	1	6
(United States) G Magers	4	0
3	(United States) C Evert	6	6

Second round
(United States) H Ludloff	6^{5}	3
(United States) L Antonoplis	7^{7}	6
(Switzerland) C Cohen	6^{4}	7	11
(France) C Suire	7^{7}	5	9
(Belgium) S Wasserman	6^{3}	0
(United States) P Fendick	7^{7}	6
(United States) B Bowes	0	1
3	(United States) C Evert	6	6

Third round
(United States) L Antonoplis	6	1	7
(Switzerland) C Cohen	4	6	9
(United States) P Fendick	6	1	1
3	(United States) C Evert	4	6	6

Fourth round
(Switzerland) C Cohen	1	1
3	(United States) C Evert	6	6

==== Section 7 ====
First round
6	(Czechoslovakia) H Suková	6	6
(United States) J Golder	2	2
(France) E Derly	6^{3}	1
(Australia) L Field	7^{7}	6
(Belgium) A Devries	2	6	6
Q	(United Kingdom) T Catlin	6	0	1
(Sweden) M Lindström	6	6
(Netherlands) C Bakkum	1	3
(Australia) S McCann	6	6
(Netherlands) B Schultz	3	2
(Switzerland) C Jolissaint	1	7^{7}	0
(New Zealand) B Cordwell	6	6^{5}	6
(Australia) N Provis	6	6
(United Kingdom) V Lake	3	2
Q	(United States) W Wood	6	4	8
14	(Australia) D Balestrat	2	6	6

Second round
6	(Czechoslovakia) H Suková	6	6
(Australia) L Field	4	3
(Belgium) A Devries	4	1
(Sweden) M Lindström	6	6
(Australia) S McCann	2	2
(New Zealand) B Cordwell	6	6
(Australia) N Provis	6	6
Q	(United States) W Wood	3	2

Third round
6	(Czechoslovakia) H Suková	6	6
(Sweden) M Lindström	2	3
(New Zealand) B Cordwell	6	5	6
(Australia) N Provis	3	7	2

Fourth round
6	(Czechoslovakia) H Suková	7^{7}	6
(New Zealand) B Cordwell	6^{4}	3

==== Section 8 ====
First round
11	(West Germany) S Hanika	3	6	6
(United Kingdom) S Gomer	6	4	1
(United States) M Werdel	6	6
(United States) K Adams	4	1
(Japan) K Okamoto	5	2
(New Zealand) J Richardson	7	6
(United States) C Benjamin	4	2
(United States) L-A Eldredge	6	6
(Japan) A Kijimuta	7^{7}	6
(Peru) P Vásquez	6^{0}	1
(United States) S Collins	6^{5}	6	6
(Netherlands) M Mesker	7^{7}	4	3
(United States) A-M Fernandez	7^{9}	6
WC	(Australia) K Radford	6^{7}	3
(Australia) E Minter	3	0
2	(United States) M Navratilova	6	6

Second round
11	(West Germany) S Hanika	6	6
(United States) M Werdel	4	2
(New Zealand) J Richardson	6^{2}	4
(United States) L-A Eldredge	7^{7}	6
(Japan) A Kijimuta	2	7^{7}	6
(United States) S Collins	6	6^{5}	2
(United States) A-M Fernandez	1	0
2	(United States) M Navratilova	6	6

Third round
11	(West Germany) S Hanika	6	6
(United States) L-A Eldredge	4	1
(Japan) A Kijimuta	6	2	2
2	(United States) M Navratilova	4	6	6

Fourth round
11	(West Germany) S Hanika	4	0
2	(United States) M Navratilova	6	6

== See also ==
- Evert–Navratilova rivalry

Preceded by 1987 US Open – Women's singles	Grand Slam women's singles	Succeeded by 1988 French Open – Women's singles
