= 1988 French Open – Women's singles qualifying =

Women's singles qualifying
- 1988 French Open

Events
Singles	men	women		boys	girls
Doubles	men	women	mixed	boys	girls
WC Singles	men	women	quad
WC Doubles	men	women	quad
Legends	−45	45+	women

Qualification
Singles	men	women
- French Open

Players who neither had high enough rankings nor received wild cards to enter the main draw of the annual French Open Tennis Championships participated in a qualifying tournament held in the week before the event.

== Seeds ==
1. (United States) Penny Barg (second round)
2. (United Kingdom) Clare Wood (qualifying competition, lucky loser)
3. (Italy) Laura Lapi (second round)
4. (Peru) Pilar Vásquez (second round)
5. (Italy) Barbara Romanò (qualified)
6. (United States) Anna-Maria Fernandez (first round)
7. (Netherlands) Nicole Muns-Jagerman (qualifying competition, lucky loser)
8. (Brazil) Andrea Vieira (first round)
9. (Czechoslovakia) Jana Pospíšilová (qualified)
10. (United States) Louise Allen (first round)
11. (Japan) Akemi Nishiya (first round)
12. (Netherlands) Carin Bakkum (first round)
13. (South Africa) Mariaan de Swardt (second round)
14. (Norway) Amy Jönsson Raaholt (second round)
15. (United States) Melissa Brown (first round)
16. (Netherlands) Simone Schilder (first round)

== Qualifiers ==
1. (Argentina) Andrea Tiezzi
2. (Italy) Barbara Romanò
3. (France) Marie-Christine Damas
4. (Spain) Conchita Martínez
5. (Sweden) Jonna Jonerup
6. (West Germany) Sabine Hack
7. (Sweden) Maria Strandlund
8. (Czechoslovakia) Jana Pospíšilová

== Lucky losers ==
1. (Brazil) Luciano Corsato
2. (Netherlands) Nicole Muns-Jagerman
3. (Belgium) Sabine Appelmans
4. (United Kingdom) Clare Wood

== Qualifying draw ==
Key

- Q = Qualifier
- WC = Wild card
- LL = Lucky loser
- Alt = Alternate
- ITF = ITF entry
- PR = Protected ranking
- SR = Special ranking
- SE = Special exempt
- JE = Junior exempt
- JR = Junior Accelerator Programme entrant
- CO = College Accelerator Programme entrant
- NG = Next Gen Accelerator Program entrant
- w/o = Walkover
- r = Retired
- d = Defaulted

=== First qualifier ===
First round
1	(United States) Penny Barg	6	6
(United States) Jane Thomas	1	1
WC	(Italy) Caterina Nozzoli	6	6
(Japan) Miki Mizokuchi	0	4
(United Kingdom) Teresa Catlin	7^{7}	2	0
(Argentina) Andrea Tiezzi	6^{5}	6	6
(Canada) Maureen Drake	6	0	1
13	(South Africa) Mariaan de Swardt	2	6	6

Second round
1	(United States) Penny Barg	6^{3}	6	3
WC	(Italy) Caterina Nozzoli	7^{7}	3	6
(Argentina) Andrea Tiezzi	6	6
13	(South Africa) Mariaan de Swardt	4	1

Qualifying competition
WC	(Italy) Caterina Nozzoli	1	2
(Argentina) Andrea Tiezzi	6	6

=== Second qualifier ===
First round
11	(Japan) Akemi Nishiya	4	3
(West Germany) Heike Thoms	6	6
(South Africa) Lise Gregory	7	7
(United States) Wendy Wood	5	5
(West Germany) Katharina Düll	6^{3}	7^{7}	6
(Spain) María José Llorca	7^{7}	6^{5}	3
(Japan) Yukie Koizumi	4	6^{2}
5	(Italy) Barbara Romanò	6	7^{7}

Second round
(West Germany) Heike Thoms	6	6
(South Africa) Lise Gregory	2	3
(West Germany) Katharina Düll	1	3
5	(Italy) Barbara Romanò	6	6

Qualifying competition
(West Germany) Heike Thoms	2	4
5	(Italy) Barbara Romanò	6	6

=== Third qualifier ===
First round
3	(Italy) Laura Lapi	1	6	7
(West Germany) Andrea Betzner	6	0	5
(United States) Emilse Longo	3	4
(France) Marie-Christine Damas	6	6
(Australia) Rachel McQuillan	6	6
(United Kingdom) Lisa Gould	3	4
(Belgium) Sabine Appelmans	6	6
15	(United States) Melissa Brown	3	2

Second round
3	(Italy) Laura Lapi	6^{4}	2
(France) Marie-Christine Damas	7^{7}	6
(Australia) Rachel McQuillan	4	4
(Belgium) Sabine Appelmans	6	6

Qualifying competition
(France) Marie-Christine Damas	6	6
(Belgium) Sabine Appelmans	2	1

=== Fourth qualifier ===
First round
10	(United States) Louise Allen	4	3
WC	(France) Sophie Amiach	6	6
(Spain) Conchita Martínez	6	6
(Australia) Jo-Anne Faull	2	3
(Czechoslovakia) Hana Fukárková	5	6	4
(France) Pascale Etchemendy	7	3	6
(Japan) Maya Kidowaki	2	2
7	(Netherlands) Nicole Muns-Jagerman	6	6

Second round
WC	(France) Sophie Amiach	3	4
(Spain) Conchita Martínez	6	6
(France) Pascale Etchemendy	2	2
7	(Netherlands) Nicole Muns-Jagerman	6	6

Qualifying competition
(Spain) Conchita Martínez	6	6
7	(Netherlands) Nicole Muns-Jagerman	2	3

=== Fifth qualifier ===
First round
6	(United States) Anna-Maria Fernandez	2	0
WC	(France) Isabelle Crudo	6	6
(Brazil) Luciana Corsato-Owsianka	7	6
(South Africa) Kim Labuschagne	5	1
(West Germany) Annette Gerber	4	2
(United States) Elizabeth Galphin	6	6
(Sweden) Jonna Jonerup	6	6
16	(Netherlands) Simone Schilder	2	3

Second round
WC	(France) Isabelle Crudo	7	2	0
(Brazil) Luciana Corsato-Owsianka	5	6	6
(United States) Elizabeth Galphin	4	6	5
(Sweden) Jonna Jonerup	6	1	7

Qualifying competition
(Brazil) Luciana Corsato-Owsianka	3	7^{7}	4
(Sweden) Jonna Jonerup	6	6^{5}	6

=== Sixth qualifier ===
First round
14	(Norway) Amy Jönsson Raaholt	6	6
(Spain) Inmaculada Varas	2	4
WC	(France) Nathalie Phan-Thanh	6	7^{7}
(New Zealand) Ruth Seeman	4	6^{5}
(United States) Luanne Spadea	0	2
(West Germany) Sabine Hack	6	6
WC	(France) Nathalie Housset	6	3	2
4	(Peru) Pilar Vásquez	4	6	6

Second round
14	(Norway) Amy Jönsson Raaholt	1	3
WC	(France) Nathalie Phan-Thanh	6	6
(West Germany) Sabine Hack	6	6
4	(Peru) Pilar Vásquez	2	1

Qualifying competition
WC	(France) Nathalie Phan-Thanh	2	3
(West Germany) Sabine Hack	6	6

=== Seventh qualifier ===
First round
8	(Brazil) Andrea Vieira	1	5
(Sweden) Maria Strandlund	6	7
(Brazil) Luciana Tella	3	4
WC	(France) Virginie Paquet	6	6
(Soviet Union) Natalia Medvedeva	7	6
WC	(France) Sylvie Sabas	5	3
WC	(France) Catherine Bonnet	6	3	6
12	(Netherlands) Carin Bakkum	3	6	3

Second round
(Sweden) Maria Strandlund	6	6
WC	(France) Virginie Paquet	1	3
(Soviet Union) Natalia Medvedeva	3	4
WC	(France) Catherine Bonnet	6	6

Qualifying competition
(Sweden) Maria Strandlund	5	6	6
WC	(France) Catherine Bonnet	7	0	2

=== Eighth qualifier ===
First round
9	(Czechoslovakia) Jana Pospíšilová	6	6
(Argentina) Gabriela Mosca	3	3
(Netherlands) Nicolette Rooimans	6	6
(Socialist Federal Republic of Yugoslavia) Karmen Škulj	2	3
(Netherlands) Marianne van der Torre	6	6
(Sweden) Helena Dahlström	3	0
(Czechoslovakia) Denisa Krajčovičová	3	1
2	(United Kingdom) Clare Wood	6	6

Second round
9	(Czechoslovakia) Jana Pospíšilová	6	4	6
(Netherlands) Nicolette Rooimans	3	6	0
(Netherlands) Marianne van der Torre	4	1
2	(United Kingdom) Clare Wood	6	6

Qualifying competition
9	(Czechoslovakia) Jana Pospíšilová	6	6
2	(United Kingdom) Clare Wood	2	1
