= 1990 Virginia Slims of Newport – Doubles =

Doubles
- 1990 Volvo Hall of Fame Tennis Championships and the Virginia Slims of Newport

Final
- Champions: (South Africa) Lise Gregory (United States) Gretchen Magers
- Runners-up: (United States) Patty Fendick (United States) Anne Smith
- Score: 7–6^{(9–7)}, 6–1

Details
- Draw: 16
- Seeds: 4

Events
Singles	men	women
Doubles	men	women
- Hall of Fame Open Virginia Slims of Newport

Gigi Fernández and Lori McNeil were the defending champions, but none competed this year.

Lise Gregory and Gretchen Magers won the title by defeating Patty Fendick and Anne Smith 7–6^{(9–7)}, 6–1 in the final.

== Seeds ==
1. (United States) Erika deLone / (United States) Audra Keller (first round)
2. (United States) Elise Burgin / (South Africa) Rosalyn Fairbank-Nideffer (first round)
3. (United States) Patty Fendick / (United States) Anne Smith (final)
4. (South Africa) Lise Gregory / (United States) Gretchen Magers (champions)

== Draw ==
Key

- Q = Qualifier
- WC = Wild card
- LL = Lucky loser
- Alt = Alternate
- ITF = ITF entry
- PR = Protected ranking
- SR = Special ranking
- SE = Special exempt
- JE = Junior exempt
- JR = Junior Accelerator Programme entrant
- CO = College Accelerator Programme entrant
- NG = Next Gen Accelerator Program entrant
- w/o = Walkover
- r = Retired
- d = Defaulted

=== Draw ===
First round
1	(United States) E deLone (United States) A Keller	2	2
(Netherlands) M Bollegraf (United States) M McGrath	6	6
(United States) A Henricksson (South Africa) D Van Rensburg	6	6
(United States) S Birch (United States) S McCarthy	3	3
3	(United States) P Fendick (United States) A Smith	6	6
(United States) L Antonoplis (United States) A Leand	4	1
(Peru) L Gildemeister (United States) J Smoller	7	4	6
(Italy) L Golarsa (United States) H Na	6	6	1
(South Africa) R Field (United States) A May	4	4
(Australia) L Field (United States) W White-Prausa	6	6
(Poland) R Baranski (Japan) E Iida	4	1
4	(South Africa) L Gregory (United States) G Magers	6	6
(Finland) A Aallonen (Netherlands) C Vis	7	4	1
(United Kingdom) K Hand (Australia) C Thompson	6	6	6
(United Kingdom) J Durie (New Zealand) J Richardson	6	6
2	(United States) E Burgin (South Africa) R Fairbank-Nideffer	3	3

Quarterfinals
(Netherlands) M Bollegraf (United States) M McGrath	6	6
(United States) A Henricksson (South Africa) D Van Rensburg	0	4
3	(United States) P Fendick (United States) A Smith	7	5	7
(Peru) L Gildemeister (United States) J Smoller	5	7	5
(Australia) L Field (United States) W White-Prausa	6	1
4	(South Africa) L Gregory (United States) G Magers	7	6
(United Kingdom) K Hand (Australia) C Thompson	2	2
(United Kingdom) J Durie (New Zealand) J Richardson	6	6

Semifinals
(Netherlands) M Bollegraf (United States) M McGrath	3	6	3
3	(United States) P Fendick (United States) A Smith	6	3	6
4	(South Africa) L Gregory (United States) G Magers	6	6	7
(United Kingdom) J Durie (New Zealand) J Richardson	2	7	5

Final
3	(United States) P Fendick (United States) A Smith	6^{7}	1
4	(South Africa) L Gregory (United States) G Magers	7^{9}	6
