= 1988 Cincinnati Open – Men's doubles =

Men's doubles
- 1988 Cincinnati Open

Final
- Champions: (United States) Rick Leach (United States) Jim Pugh
- Runners-up: (United States) Jim Grabb (United States) Patrick McEnroe
- Score: 6–2, 6–4

Details
- Draw: 32
- Seeds: 8

Events
| Singles | men | women |
| Doubles | men | women |
| ← 1987 · | Cincinnati Open | · 1989 → |

Ken Flach and Robert Seguso were the defending champions, but lost in the quarterfinals to Jim Grabb and Patrick McEnroe.

Rick Leach and Jim Pugh won the title by defeating Grabb and McEnroe 6–2, 6–4 in the final.

== Seeds ==
1. (United States) Ken Flach / (United States) Robert Seguso (quarterfinals)
2. (Mexico) Jorge Lozano / (United States) Todd Witsken (semifinals)
3. (United States) Kevin Curren / (United States) David Pate (quarterfinals)
4. (United States) Rick Leach / (United States) Jim Pugh (champions)
5. (Australia) Darren Cahill / (Sweden) Anders Järryd (semifinals)
6. (South Africa) Pieter Aldrich / (South Africa) Danie Visser (first round, retired)
7. (Australia) Wally Masur / (Australia) Mark Woodforde (second round)
8. (United States) Steve Denton / (Ecuador) Andrés Gómez (second round)

== Draw ==
=== Key ===
- Q = Qualifier
- WC = Wild card
- LL = Lucky loser
- Alt = Alternate
- SE = Special exempt
- PR = Protected ranking
- ITF = ITF entry
- JE = Junior exempt
- w/o = Walkover
- r = Retired
- d = Defaulted
- SR = Special ranking

=== Finals ===
Semifinals
(United States) Jim Grabb (United States) Patrick McEnroe | 4 | 7 | 6
5 | (Australia) Darren Cahill (Sweden) Anders Järryd | 6 | 6 | 3
4 | (United States) Rick Leach (United States) Jim Pugh | 6 | 1 | 7
2 | (Mexico) Jorge Lozano (United States) Todd Witsken | 4 | 6 | 6

Final
(United States) Jim Grabb (United States) Patrick McEnroe | 2 | 4
4 | (United States) Rick Leach (United States) Jim Pugh | 6 | 6

=== Top half ===
First round
1 | (United States) K Flach (United States) R Seguso | 4 | 7 | 6
(United States) D Dowlen (United States) B Gilbert | 6 | 6 | 2
(United Kingdom) A Castle (United States) T Wilkison | 6 | 5 | 6
(United States) G Donnelly (United States) G Holmes | 4 | 7 | 7
(Switzerland) J Hlasek (Sweden) J Svensson | 3 | 5
(United States) J Grabb (United States) P McEnroe | 6 | 7
(South Africa) E Edwards (South Africa) G Muller | 1 | 3
7 | (Australia) W Masur (Australia) M Woodforde | 6 | 6
3 | (United States) K Curren (United States) D Pate | 6 | 6 | 6
(United States) S Davis (United States) D Goldie | 7 | 2 | 3
(Australia) P Doohan (Australia) L Warder | 7 | 4 | 7
(United Kingdom) J Bates (Sweden) P Lundgren | 6 | 6 | 6
(Australia) P Carter (Australia) C Limberger | 1 | 4
(Brazil) R Acioly (Argentina) J Frana | 6 | 6
(United States) M De Palmer (Australia) M Fancutt | 6 | 1 | 6
5 | (Australia) D Cahill (Sweden) A Järryd | 4 | 6 | 7

Second round
1 | (United States) K Flach (United States) R Seguso | 6 | 6
(United States) G Donnelly (United States) G Holmes | 3 | 4
(United States) J Grabb (United States) P McEnroe | 6 | 7 | 6
7 | (Australia) W Masur (Australia) M Woodforde | 7 | 6 | 2
3 | (United States) K Curren (United States) D Pate | 7 | 7
(Australia) P Doohan (Australia) L Warder | 5 | 6
(Brazil) R Acioly (Argentina) J Frana | 3 | 4
5 | (Australia) D Cahill (Sweden) A Järryd | 6 | 6

Quarterfinals
1 | (United States) K Flach (United States) R Seguso | 5 | 6
(United States) J Grabb (United States) P McEnroe | 7 | 7
3 | (United States) K Curren (United States) D Pate | 7 | 4 | 6
5 | (Australia) D Cahill (Sweden) A Järryd | 6 | 6 | 7

Semifinals
(United States) J Grabb (United States) P McEnroe | 4 | 7 | 6
5 | (Australia) D Cahill (Sweden) A Järryd | 6 | 6 | 3

=== Bottom half ===
First round
6 | (South Africa) P Aldrich (South Africa) D Visser | 7 | 2^{r}
(United States) E Korita (United States) J Levine | 6 | 4
(United States) S Stewart (Australia) K Warwick | 3 | 2
(United States) J Rive (United States) T Siegel | 6 | 6
(United States) K Jones (Denmark) M Mortensen | 7 | 6
(United States) P Chamberlin (Netherlands) M Schapers | 5 | 3
(The Bahamas) R Smith (Kenya) P Wekesa | 4 | 6 | 3
4 | (United States) R Leach (United States) J Pugh | 6 | 2 | 6
8 | (United States) S Denton (Ecuador) A Gómez | 4 | 1
(Austria) A Antonitsch (United States) R Baxter | 6 | 1^{r}
(United States) M Davis (United States) T Pawsat | 6 | 6
(Czechoslovakia) M Mečíř (Czechoslovakia) M Šrejber | 4 | 3
(United States) J Arias (Argentina) H de la Peña | 4 | 4
(United States) M Basham (United States) C Beckman | 6 | 6
(Australia) R Barlow (United Kingdom) D Felgate | 1 | 3
2 | (Mexico) J Lozano (United States) T Witsken | 6 | 6

Second round
(United States) E Korita (United States) J Levine | 6 | 6 | 7
(United States) J Rive (United States) T Siegel | 7 | 3 | 6
(United States) K Jones (Denmark) M Mortensen | 3 | 6 | 2
4 | (United States) R Leach (United States) J Pugh | 6 | 4 | 6
8 | (United States) S Denton (Ecuador) A Gómez | 4 | 6 | 3
(United States) M Davis (United States) T Pawsat | 6 | 3 | 6
(United States) M Basham (United States) C Beckman | 5 | 2
2 | (Mexico) J Lozano (United States) T Witsken | 7 | 6

Quarterfinals
(United States) E Korita (United States) J Levine | 3 | 3
4 | (United States) R Leach (United States) J Pugh | 6 | 6
(United States) M Davis (United States) T Pawsat | 4 | 2
2 | (Mexico) J Lozano (United States) T Witsken | 6 | 6

Semifinals
4 | (United States) R Leach (United States) J Pugh | 6 | 1 | 7
2 | (Mexico) J Lozano (United States) T Witsken | 4 | 6 | 6
