= 1989 Australian Open – Women's doubles =

Women's doubles
- 1989 Australian Open

Final
- Champions: (United States) Martina Navratilova (United States) Pam Shriver
- Runners-up: (United States) Patty Fendick (Canada) Jill Hetherington
- Score: 3–6, 6–3, 6–2

Details
- Draw: 64
- Seeds: 16

Events
Singles	men	women		boys	girls
Doubles	men	women	mixed	boys	girls
WC Singles	men	women	quad
WC Doubles	men	women	quad
Legends	men	women	mixed
- Australian Open

Six-time defending champions Martina Navratilova and Pam Shriver successfully defended their title, defeating Patty Fendick and Jill Hetherington in the final, 3–6, 6–3, 6–2 to win the women's doubles tennis title at the 1989 Australian Open.

== Seeds ==
Champion seeds are indicated in bold text while text in italics indicates the round in which those seeds were eliminated.

1. (United States) **Martina Navratilova** / (United States) **Pam Shriver (champions)**
2. (West Germany) Steffi Graf / (Argentina) Gabriela Sabatini (semifinals)
3. (Czechoslovakia) Jana Novotná / (Czechoslovakia) Helena Suková (semifinals)
4. (United States) Katrina Adams / (United States) Zina Garrison (third round)
5. (United States) Elise Burgin / (United States) Lori McNeil (quarterfinals)
6. (United States) Patty Fendick / (Canada) Jill Hetherington (final)
7. (Australia) Elizabeth Smylie / (Australia) Wendy Turnbull (quarterfinals)
8. (Australia) Jenny Byrne / (Australia) Janine Tremelling (first round)
9. (United States) Terry Phelps / (Italy) Raffaella Reggi (third round)
10. (France) Nathalie Herreman / (West Germany) Eva Pfaff (second round)
11. (Netherlands) Manon Bollegraf / (Australia) Nicole Provis (second round)
12. (United States) Ann Henricksson / (United States) Beth Herr (third round)
13. (New Zealand) Belinda Cordwell / (South Africa) Dianne Van Rensburg (third round)
14. (West Germany) Claudia Porwik / (France) Catherine Tanvier (quarterfinals)
15. (United Kingdom) Jo Durie / (United States) Mary Joe Fernández (quarterfinals)
16. (United States) Lea Antonoplis / (United States) Kathleen Horvath (second round)

== Draw ==
Key

- Q = Qualifier
- WC = Wild card
- LL = Lucky loser
- Alt = Alternate
- ITF = ITF entry
- PR = Protected ranking
- SR = Special ranking
- SE = Special exempt
- JE = Junior exempt
- JR = Junior Accelerator Programme entrant
- CO = College Accelerator Programme entrant
- NG = Next Gen Accelerator Program entrant
- w/o = Walkover
- r = Retired
- d = Defaulted

=== Finals ===
Semifinals
1	(United States) Martina Navratilova (United States) Pam Shriver	6	7
3	(Czechoslovakia) Jana Novotná (Czechoslovakia) Helena Suková	4	5
6	(United States) Patty Fendick (Canada) Jill Hetherington	6	7^{7}
2	(West Germany) Steffi Graf (Argentina) Gabriela Sabatini	3	6^{3}

Final
1	(United States) Martina Navratilova (United States) Pam Shriver	3	6	6
6	(United States) Patty Fendick (Canada) Jill Hetherington	6	3	2

=== Top half ===
==== Section 1 ====
First round
1	(United States) M Navratilova (United States) P Shriver	6	6
ALT	(United States) E Galphin (United Kingdom) A Grunfeld	0	0
(United States) H Cioffi (United States) A Frazier	4	6	6
(Brazil) G Miró (Australia) L O'Neill	6	2	1
(Switzerland) C Cohen (Switzerland) S Jaquet	6	6
(Sweden) M Ekstrand (Sweden) J Jonerup	2	4
WC	(Australia) S McCann (Australia) C Thompson	0	1
13	(New Zealand) B Cordwell (South Africa) D van Rensburg	6	6
16	(United States) L Antonoplis (United States) K Horvath	6	4	7
ALT	(Japan) K Ito (Japan) Y Kajita	3	6	5
(West Germany) S Hanika (West Germany) C Kohde-Kilsch	6	6
(Australia) A Minter (Netherlands) H Witvoet	4	4
(Australia) D Balestrat (New Zealand) J Richardson	5	7^{7}	6
(Poland) R Baranski (Australia) R Lamb	7	6^{4}	3
(Czechoslovakia) I Budařová (United Kingdom) C Wood	6^{8}	1
7	(Australia) E Smylie (Australia) W Turnbull	7^{10}	6

Second round
1	(United States) M Navratilova (United States) P Shriver	6	6
(United States) H Cioffi (United States) A Frazier	2	3
(Switzerland) C Cohen (Switzerland) S Jaquet	2	2
13	(New Zealand) B Cordwell (South Africa) D van Rensburg	6	6
16	(United States) L Antonoplis (United States) K Horvath	1	0
(West Germany) S Hanika (West Germany) C Kohde-Kilsch	6	6
(Australia) D Balestrat (New Zealand) J Richardson	3	0
7	(Australia) E Smylie (Australia) W Turnbull	6	6

Third round
1	(United States) M Navratilova (United States) P Shriver	6	6
13	(New Zealand) B Cordwell (South Africa) D van Rensburg	3	3
(West Germany) S Hanika (West Germany) C Kohde-Kilsch	3	1
7	(Australia) E Smylie (Australia) W Turnbull	6	6

Quarterfinals
1	(United States) M Navratilova (United States) P Shriver	6	6
7	(Australia) E Smylie (Australia) W Turnbull	1	4

==== Section 2 ====
First round
3	(Czechoslovakia) J Novotná (Czechoslovakia) H Suková	6	6
(United States) C Benjamin (Hong Kong) P Hy	1	2
(Switzerland) E Krapl (Czechoslovakia) P Langrová	5	1
(United States) L Allen (United States) G Magers	7	6
(United States) J Fuchs (United States) J Smoller	6	7
(France) V Paquet (France) K Quentrec	4	5
(West Germany) A Betzner (West Germany) W Probst	4	3
11	(Netherlands) M Bollegraf (Australia) N Provis	6	6
9	(United States) T Phelps (Italy) R Reggi	6	6
WC	(Australia) M Bowrey (Hungary) A Temesvári	1	2
WC	(Australia) K-A Guse (Australia) Bi Potter	6^{4}	1
(France) J Halard (Belgium) S Wasserman	7^{7}	6
(Australia) T Morton (Austria) H Sprung	6	5	6
(Japan) A Nishiya (Japan) M Yanagi	0	7	4
(United States) A Grossman (Czechoslovakia) E Švíglerová	4	3
5	(United States) E Burgin (United States) L McNeil	6	6

Second round
3	(Czechoslovakia) J Novotná (Czechoslovakia) H Suková	6	7^{7}
(United States) L Allen (United States) G Magers	4	6^{5}
(United States) J Fuchs (United States) J Smoller	6	6
11	(Netherlands) M Bollegraf (Australia) N Provis	4	4
9	(United States) T Phelps (Italy) R Reggi	4	6	6
(France) J Halard (Belgium) S Wasserman	6	3	4
(Australia) T Morton (Austria) H Sprung	4	3
5	(United States) E Burgin (United States) L McNeil	6	6

Third round
3	(Czechoslovakia) J Novotná (Czechoslovakia) H Suková	6	6
(United States) J Fuchs (United States) J Smoller	3	2
9	(United States) T Phelps (Italy) R Reggi	6	5	1
5	(United States) E Burgin (United States) L McNeil	4	7	6

Quarterfinals
3	(Czechoslovakia) J Novotná (Czechoslovakia) H Suková	6	6
5	(United States) E Burgin (United States) L McNeil	3	3

=== Bottom half ===
==== Section 3 ====
First round
6	(United States) P Fendick (Canada) J Hetherington	6	3	6
(Australia) L Field (Australia) M Jaggard	4	6	3
(Australia) A Scott (United States) M Van Nostrand	4	6	6
(United States) A M Fernandez (United States) J Thomas	6	4	3
(South Africa) L Gregory (United States) R Reis	6	6
(Poland) I Kuczyńska (Austria) J Wiesner	4	4
(United States) L Bartlett (United States) M Werdel	3	0
10	(France) N Herreman (West Germany) E Pfaff	6	6
14	(West Germany) C Porwik (France) C Tanvier	6	6
(Netherlands) C Bakkum (Netherlands) B Schultz	4	2
(Japan) M Kidowaki (Japan) N Sato	4	4
(Belgium) A Devries (Netherlands) N Jagerman	6	6
(United States) Ca MacGregor (United States) Cy MacGregor	6	6
(Italy) C Caverzasio (Italy) L Golarsa	4	3
WC	(Australia) L Stacey (Australia) J Taylor	0	3
4	(United States) K Adams (United States) Z Garrison	6	6

Second round
6	(United States) P Fendick (Canada) J Hetherington	7	6
(Australia) A Scott (United States) M Van Nostrand	5	2
(South Africa) L Gregory (United States) R Reis	6	7
10	(France) N Herreman (West Germany) E Pfaff	3	5
14	(West Germany) C Porwik (France) C Tanvier	6	6
(Belgium) A Devries (Netherlands) N Jagerman	2	3
(United States) Ca MacGregor (United States) Cy MacGregor	3	3
4	(United States) K Adams (United States) Z Garrison	6	6

Third round
6	(United States) P Fendick (Canada) J Hetherington	6	7
(South Africa) L Gregory (United States) R Reis	3	5
14	(West Germany) C Porwik (France) C Tanvier	4	7^{7}	6
4	(United States) K Adams (United States) Z Garrison	6	6^{4}	2

Quarterfinals
6	(United States) P Fendick (Canada) J Hetherington	7	6
14	(West Germany) C Porwik (France) C Tanvier	5	1

==== Section 4 ====
First round
8	(Australia) J Byrne (Australia) J Tremelling	3	4
(France) A Dechaume (France) E Derly	6	6
(United Kingdom) A Simpkin (New Zealand) C Toleafoa	3	4
(United States) C Christian (Peru) P Vásquez	6	6
(Japan) Y Koizumi (Netherlands) H ter Riet	3	2
(Sweden) C Lindqvist (Sweden) M Strandlund	6	6
(Sweden) M Lindström (United States) H Ludloff	4	1
15	(United Kingdom) J Durie (United States) M J Fernández	6	6
12	(United States) A Henricksson (United States) B Herr	6	3	6
(Australia) H Mandlíková (United States) Ba Potter	4	6	1
(Sweden) C Dahlman (Czechoslovakia) R Maršíková	3	3
(West Germany) S Meier (West Germany) C Singer	6	6
(Australia) J-A Faull (Australia) R McQuillan	6	6
(United States) B Bowes (United States) S Collins	4	4
(Australia) K McDonald (Australia) R Stubbs	1	1
2	(West Germany) S Graf (Argentina) G Sabatini	6	6

Second round
(France) A Dechaume (France) E Derly	6	6
(United States) C Christian (Peru) P Vásquez	2	3
(Sweden) C Lindqvist (Sweden) M Strandlund	3	5
15	(United Kingdom) J Durie (United States) M J Fernández	6	7
12	(United States) A Henricksson (United States) B Herr	6	6
(West Germany) S Meier (West Germany) C Singer	2	3
(Australia) J-A Faull (Australia) R McQuillan	4	4
2	(West Germany) S Graf (Argentina) G Sabatini	6	6

Third round
(France) A Dechaume (France) E Derly	2	3
15	(United Kingdom) J Durie (United States) M J Fernández	6	6
12	(United States) A Henricksson (United States) B Herr	6^{8}	7^{7}	3
2	(West Germany) S Graf (Argentina) G Sabatini	7^{10}	6^{5}	6

Quarterfinals
15	(United Kingdom) J Durie (United States) M J Fernández	3	7	4
2	(West Germany) S Graf (Argentina) G Sabatini	6	5	6
