= 1988 Cincinnati Open – Men's singles =

Men's singles
- 1988 Cincinnati Open

Final
- Champion: (Sweden) Mats Wilander
- Runner-up: (Sweden) Stefan Edberg
- Score: 3–6, 7–6^{(7–5)}, 7–6^{(7–5)}

Details
- Draw: 64
- Seeds: 16

Events
Singles	men	women
Doubles	men	women
← 1987 ·	Cincinnati Open	· 1989 →

Stefan Edberg was the defending champion, but lost to Mats Wilander in the final 6–3, 6–7^{(5–7)}, 6–7^{(5–7)}.

== Seeds ==
The top eight seeds received a bye to the second round.

1. (Sweden) Stefan Edberg (final)
2. (Sweden) Mats Wilander (champion)
3. (United States) Jimmy Connors (third round, withdrew because of tendinitis in his left elbow)
4. (Australia) Pat Cash (second round)
5. (Czechoslovakia) Miloslav Mečíř (first round)
6. (United States) Brad Gilbert (third round)
7. (Argentina) Guillermo Pérez Roldán (first round)
8. (Sweden) Jonas Svensson (first round)
9. (Ecuador) Andrés Gómez (third round, defaulted)
10. (Soviet Union) Andrei Chesnokov (second round)
11. (Sweden) Anders Järryd (semifinals)
12. (United States) Aaron Krickstein (semifinals)
13. (Switzerland) Jakob Hlasek (quarterfinals)
14. (United States) Kevin Curren (quarterfinals)
15. (United States) Dan Goldie (third round)
16. (Australia) Darren Cahill (first round)

== Draw ==
=== Key ===
- Q = Qualifier
- WC = Wild card
- LL = Lucky loser
- Alt = Alternate
- SE = Special exempt
- PR = Protected ranking
- ITF = ITF entry
- JE = Junior exempt
- w/o = Walkover
- r = Retired
- d = Defaulted
- SR = Special ranking

=== Finals ===
Quarterfinals
1	(Sweden) Stefan Edberg	6	6
(United States) Michael Chang	3	3
13	(Switzerland) Jakob Hlasek	7	3	3
11	(Sweden) Anders Järryd	6	6	6
12	(United States) Aaron Krickstein	6	2	7
14	(United States) Kevin Curren	3	6	6
Q	(Australia) Carl Limberger	6	4	5
2	(Sweden) Mats Wilander	3	6	7

Semifinals
1	(Sweden) Stefan Edberg	6	6
11	(Sweden) Anders Järryd	3	4
12	(United States) Aaron Krickstein	2	6
2	(Sweden) Mats Wilander	6	7

Final
1	(Sweden) Stefan Edberg	6	6^{5}	6^{5}
2	(Sweden) Mats Wilander	3	7^{7}	7^{7}

=== Top half ===
==== Section 1 ====
First round
1	(Sweden) S Edberg	6	6
Q	(South Africa) E Edwards	2	2
(Argentina) H de la Peña	6	4	7
Q	(United States) M Kures	4	6	6
(New Zealand) K Evernden	6	3	0
(United States) J Arias	3	6	6
(Australia) J Stoltenberg	2	6	4
15	(United States) D Goldie	6	2	6
10	(Soviet Union) A Chesnokov	6	4	6
(Austria) A Antonitsch	4	6	2
(Australia) J Frawley	6	3	6
Q	(Mexico) F Maciel	3	6	1
(Sweden) P Lundgren	6	6
(United States) R Seguso	4	3
(United States) M Chang	6	7
8	(Sweden) J Svensson	2	5

Second round
1	(Sweden) S Edberg	7	6
(Argentina) H de la Peña	5	2
(United States) J Arias	6	4
15	(United States) D Goldie	7	6
10	(Soviet Union) A Chesnokov	1	2
(Australia) J Frawley	6	6
(Sweden) P Lundgren	3	6	4
(United States) M Chang	6	4	6

Third round
1	(Sweden) S Edberg	6	4	6
15	(United States) D Goldie	3	6	4
(Australia) J Frawley	6	5	2
(United States) M Chang	4	7	6

Quarterfinals
1	(Sweden) S Edberg	6	6
(United States) M Chang	3	3

==== Section 2 ====
First round
4	(Australia) P Cash	6	2	7
(Soviet Union) A Volkov	4	6	6
WC	(Soviet Union) A Olhovskiy	4	5
(South Africa) G Muller	6	7
(India) R Krishnan	6	6
(Argentina) J Frana	3	4
(United States) T Witsken	1	6
13	(Switzerland) J Hlasek	6	7
11	(Sweden) A Järryd	6	6
(Belgium) E Masso	1	2
(Czechoslovakia) M Šrejber	6	6	6
Q	(Soviet Union) A Võsand	3	7	2
(South Africa) P Aldrich	6	2	6
(United States) K Flach	1	6	3
(United States) J Rive	6	7
5	(Czechoslovakia) M Mečíř	4	6

Second round
4	(Australia) P Cash	7	3	6
(South Africa) G Muller	5	6	7
(India) R Krishnan	6	2	3
13	(Switzerland) J Hlasek	3	6	6
11	(Sweden) A Järryd	6	6
(Czechoslovakia) M Šrejber	2	3
(South Africa) P Aldrich	7	6	4
(United States) J Rive	6	7	6

Third round
(South Africa) G Muller	6	3	4
13	(Switzerland) J Hlasek	4	6	6
11	(Sweden) A Järryd	6	6
(United States) J Rive	1	2

Quarterfinals
13	(Switzerland) J Hlasek	7	3	3
11	(Sweden) A Järryd	6	6	6

=== Bottom half ===
==== Section 3 ====
First round
6	(United States) B Gilbert	6	6
WC	(United States) P Sampras	4	2
(United States) J Grabb	3	5
(Netherlands) M Schapers	6	7
(Mexico) J Lozano	6	4	4
(United States) D Pate	4	6	6
Q	(South Africa) M Robertson	4	6	3
12	(United States) A Krickstein	6	3	6
14	(United States) K Curren	6	1	6
(Chile) R Acuña	3	6	3
(United States) M Davis	4	2
(Australia) M Woodforde	6	6
(United States) J Courier	6	4
WC	(Kenya) P Wekesa	7	6
WC	(United States) D Cassidy	4	1
3	(United States) J Connors	6	6

Second round
6	(United States) B Gilbert	7	6
(Netherlands) M Schapers	5	3
(United States) D Pate	5	6
12	(United States) A Krickstein	7	7
14	(United States) K Curren	6	6
(Australia) M Woodforde	3	2
WC	(Kenya) P Wekesa	2	3
3	(United States) J Connors	6	6

Third round
6	(United States) B Gilbert	0	3
12	(United States) A Krickstein	6	6
14	(United States) K Curren	w/o
3	(United States) J Connors

Quarterfinals
12	(United States) A Krickstein	6	2	7
14	(United States) K Curren	3	6	6

==== Section 4 ====
First round
7	(Argentina) G Pérez Roldán	6	1	6
Q	(Australia) C Limberger	3	6	7
(United States) T Wilkison	7	6
Q	(United States) R Leach	5	3
(United States) J Pugh	6	3
(Sweden) N Kroon	7	6
(United States) G Holmes	6	4
9	(Ecuador) A Gómez	7	6
16	(Australia) D Cahill	6	3	1
(Australia) W Masur	3	6	6
(Canada) M Laurendeau	6	7
(The Bahamas) R Smith	3	6
Q	(United States) P Chamberlin	4	3
WC	(United States) S Davis	6	6
(United Kingdom) A Castle	3	1
2	(Sweden) M Wilander	6	6

Second round
Q	(Australia) C Limberger	7	6
(United States) T Wilkison	6	0
(Sweden) N Kroon	1	4
9	(Ecuador) A Gómez	6	6
(Australia) W Masur	7	2	4
(Canada) M Laurendeau	6	6	6
WC	(United States) S Davis	3	4
2	(Sweden) M Wilander	6	6

Third round
Q	(Australia) C Limberger	6	3
9	(Ecuador) A Gómez	2	1^{d}
(Canada) M Laurendeau	4	2
2	(Sweden) M Wilander	6	6

Quarterfinals
Q	(Australia) C Limberger	6	4	5
2	(Sweden) M Wilander	3	6	7
