= 1988 Pringles Light Classic – Doubles =

Doubles
- 1988 Pringles Light Classic

Final
- Champions: (United States) Beth Herr (United States) Candy Reynolds
- Runners-up: (United States) Lindsay Bartlett (Canada) Helen Kelesi
- Score: 4–6, 7–6, 6–1

Events
Singles	Doubles
← 1973 ·	Pringles Light Classic	· 2004 →

Beth Herr and Candy Reynolds won in the final 4–6, 7–6, 6–1 against Lindsay Bartlett and Helen Kelesi.

== Seeds ==
Champion seeds are indicated in bold text while text in italics indicates the round in which those seeds were eliminated.

1. (Sweden) Maria Lindström / (Australia) Anne Minter (first round)
2. (United States) Peanut Louie-Harper / (United States) Wendy White (semifinals)
3. (United States) Mary Joe Fernández / (United States) JoAnne Russell (quarterfinals)
4. (United States) **Beth Herr** / (United States) **Candy Reynolds (champions)**

== Draw ==
=== Key ===
- Q = Qualifier
- WC = Wild card
- LL = Lucky loser
- Alt = Alternate
- SE = Special exempt
- PR = Protected ranking
- ITF = ITF entry
- JE = Junior exempt
- w/o = Walkover
- r = Retired
- d = Defaulted
- SR = Special ranking

First round
1	(Sweden) M Lindström (Australia) A Minter	3	4
(Canada) **C Bassett-Seguso** (United States) **T Phelps**	**6**	**6**
(United States) G Kim (United States) J Klitch	1	0
(Bulgaria) **M Maleeva** (United States) **A Smith**	**6**	**6**
4	(United States) **B Herr** (United States) **C Reynolds**	3	**6**	**6**
(United States) C Christian (United States) A Frazier	**6**	0	0
(United States) **A Farley** (United States) **A Farley-Wilson**	**6**	**6**
(United States) M Brown (United States) J Forman	0	4
(United States) **L Bartlett** (Canada) **H Kelesi**	**6**	**6**
(United States) N Killingsworth (United States) K Steinmetz	2	4
(United States) H Cioffi (United States) S Sloane	1	2
3	(United States) **M J Fernández** (United States) **J Russell**	**6**	**6**
(United States) **J Kaplan** (United States) **W Wood**	**7**	**6**
(United States) D Faber (United States) A Schwartz	5	4
(United States) L Antonoplis (New Zealand) J Richardson	3	**6**	3
2	(United States) **P Louie-Harper** (United States) **W White**	**6**	2	**6**

Quarterfinals
(Canada) **C Bassett-Seguso** (United States) **T Phelps**	5	**6**	**6**
(Bulgaria) M Maleeva (United States) A Smith	**7**	4	4
4	(United States) **B Herr** (United States) **C Reynolds**	**6**	**6**
(United States) A Farley (United States) A Farley-Wilson	0	4
(United States) **L Bartlett** (Canada) **H Kelesi**	**w/o**
3	(United States) M J Fernández (United States) J Russell
(United States) J Kaplan (United States) W Wood	1	2
2	(United States) **P Louie-Harper** (United States) **W White**	**6**	**6**

Semifinals
(Canada) C Bassett-Seguso (United States) T Phelps	**6**	3	2
4	(United States) **B Herr** (United States) **C Reynolds**	3	**6**	**6**
(United States) **L Bartlett** (Canada) **H Kelesi**	**6**	**6**
2	(United States) P Louie-Harper (United States) W White	3	4

Final
4	(United States) **Beth Herr** (United States) **Candy Reynolds**	4	**7**	**6**
(United States) Lindsay Bartlett (Canada) Helen Kelesi	**6**	6	1
