= 1988 Pringles Light Classic – Singles =

Singles
- 1988 Pringles Light Classic

Final
- Champion: (United States) Barbara Potter
- Runner-up: (Canada) Helen Kelesi
- Score: 6–2, 6–2

Details
- Draw: 32
- Seeds: 8

Events
Singles	Doubles
← 1973 ·	Pringles Light Classic	· 2004 →

Barbara Potter won in the final 6–2, 6–2 against Helen Kelesi.

== Seeds ==
A champion seed is indicated in bold text while text in italics indicates the round in which that seed was eliminated.

1. (Bulgaria) Manuela Maleeva (semifinals)
2. (United States) Mary Joe Fernández (first round)
3. (United States) **Barbara Potter (champion)**
4. (Canada) Helen Kelesi (final)
5. (Australia) Anne Minter (second round)
6. (United States) Halle Cioffi (semifinals)
7. (United States) Peanut Louie-Harper (quarterfinals)
8. (United States) Anne Smith (first round)

== Draw ==
=== Key ===
- Q = Qualifier
- WC = Wild card
- LL = Lucky loser
- Alt = Alternate
- SE = Special exempt
- PR = Protected ranking
- ITF = ITF entry
- JE = Junior exempt
- w/o = Walkover
- r = Retired
- d = Defaulted
- SR = Special ranking

First round
1	(Bulgaria) **M Maleeva**	**6**	**6**
(United States) G Kim	2	2
(United States) A Schwartz	3	2
(New Zealand) **J Richardson**	**6**	**6**
(United States) **K Rinaldi**	**6**	**6**
(United States) J Forman	2	1
(United States) L Bartlett	2	2
5	(Australia) **A Minter**	**6**	**6**
4	(Canada) **H Kelesi**	**6**	**6**
(United States) D Faber	2	0
(United States) **W White**	**6**	**7**
(United States) A Frazier	3	5
(Canada) **C Bassett-Seguso**	**6**	**6**
(United States) C Reynolds	2	2
(United States) **S Sloane**	**6**	**6**
8	(United States) A White	4	4
7	(United States) **P Louie-Harper**	5	**6**	**6**
(United States) L Antonoplis	**7**	2	3
(United States) J Klitch	5	2
(United States) **C Christian**	**7**	**6**
(United States) **T Phelps**	**6**	**6**
(United States) K Steinmetz	3	3
(United States) M Brown	4	3
3	(United States) **B Potter**	**6**	**6**
6	(United States) **H Cioffi**	**6**	**6**
(United States) J Ingram	2	2
(United States) W Wood	3	2
(United States) **M Gurney**	**6**	**6**
(Sweden) M Lindström	1	1
(United States) **A Farley**	**6**	**6**
(United States) **B Herr**	**6**	**4**
2	(United States) M J Fernández	3	1	r

Second round
1	(Bulgaria) **M Maleeva**	**6**	**6**
(New Zealand) J Richardson	3	0
(United States) **K Rinaldi**	**6**	**7**
5	(Australia) A Minter	4	5
4	(Canada) **H Kelesi**	**6**	**6**
(United States) W White	3	2
(Canada) C Bassett-Seguso	5	**7**	3
(United States) **S Sloane**	**7**	5	**6**
7	(United States) **P Louie-Harper**	**6**	**6**
(United States) C Christian	3	2
(United States) T Phelps	4	4
3	(United States) **B Potter**	**6**	**6**
6	(United States) **H Cioffi**	5	**7**	**6**
(United States) M Gurney	**7**	5	1
(United States) A Farley	**6**	4	2
(United States) **B Herr**	3	**6**	**6**

Quarterfinals
1	(Bulgaria) **M Maleeva**	**6**	**6**
(United States) K Rinaldi	3	4
4	(Canada) **H Kelesi**	**6**	**6**
(United States) S Sloane	4	3
7	(United States) P Louie-Harper	3	4
3	(United States) **B Potter**	**6**	**6**
6	(United States) **H Cioffi**	**6**	**6**
(United States) B Herr	3	3

Semifinals
1	(Bulgaria) M Maleeva	0	3
4	(Canada) **H Kelesi**	**6**	**6**
3	(United States) **B Potter**	**7**	**6**
6	(United States) H Cioffi	6	4

Final
4	(Canada) Helen Kelesi	2	2
3	(United States) **Barbara Potter**	**6**	**6**
