= 1990 Virginia Slims of Newport – Singles =

Singles
- 1990 Volvo Hall of Fame Tennis Championships and the Virginia Slims of Newport

Final
- Champion: (Spain) Arantxa Sánchez Vicario
- Runner-up: (United Kingdom) Jo Durie
- Score: 7–6^{(7–2)}, 4–6, 7–5

Details
- Draw: 32 (4Q/2LL)
- Seeds: 8

Events
Singles	men	women
Doubles	men	women
- Hall of Fame Open Virginia Slims of Newport

Zina Garrison was the defending champion, but did not compete this year.

Arantxa Sánchez Vicario won the title by defeating Jo Durie 7–6^{(7–2)}, 4–6, 7–5 in the final.

== Seeds ==
1. (Spain) Arantxa Sánchez Vicario (champion)
2. (Peru) Laura Gildemeister (first round)
3. (n/a)
4. (South Africa) Rosalyn Fairbank-Nideffer (quarterfinals)
5. (United States) Gretchen Magers (semifinals)
6. (Netherlands) Manon Bollegraf (first round)
7. (United States) Anne Smith (semifinals)
8. (South Africa) Dianne Van Rensburg (first round)

== Draw ==
Key

- Q = Qualifier
- WC = Wild card
- LL = Lucky loser
- Alt = Alternate
- ITF = ITF entry
- PR = Protected ranking
- SR = Special ranking
- SE = Special exempt
- JE = Junior exempt
- JR = Junior Accelerator Programme entrant
- CO = College Accelerator Programme entrant
- NG = Next Gen Accelerator Program entrant
- w/o = Walkover
- r = Retired
- d = Defaulted

=== Finals ===
Semifinals
1	(Spain) Arantxa Sánchez Vicario	6	6
5	(United States) Gretchen Magers	3	2
(United Kingdom) Jo Durie	6	6
7	(United States) Anne Smith	4	1

Final
1	(Spain) Arantxa Sánchez Vicario	7^{7}	4	7
(United Kingdom) Jo Durie	6^{2}	6	5

=== Top half ===
First round
1	(Spain) A Sánchez Vicario	6	6
Q	(United States) G Helgeson	3	3
(United States) E Burgin	7	6	5
(Netherlands) B Schultz	6	7	7
(United States) A Henricksson	6	4	5
(United States) W White-Prausa	4	6	7
(United States) M McGrath	6	6
8	(South Africa) D Van Rensburg	4	4
5	(United States) G Magers	6	7
(Italy) L Golarsa	4	6
(United States) A Farley	3	6	4
LL	(New Zealand) J Richardson	6	1	6
(New Zealand) B Cordwell	3	2
Q	(United States) E deLone	6	6
(Australia) L Field	6	6
(United States) P Fendick	4	4

Second round
1	(Spain) A Sánchez Vicario	4	6	6
(Netherlands) B Schultz	6	2	2
(United States) W White-Prausa	3	2
(United States) M McGrath	6	6
5	(United States) G Magers	6	6
LL	(New Zealand) J Richardson	1	1
Q	(United States) E deLone	3	2
(Australia) L Field	6	6

Quarterfinals
1	(Spain) A Sánchez Vicario	6	7
(United States) M McGrath	4	5
5	(United States) G Magers	6	7
(Australia) L Field	0	6

Semifinals
1	(Spain) A Sánchez Vicario	6	6
5	(United States) G Magers	3	2

=== Bottom half ===
First round
6	(Netherlands) M Bollegraf	3	2
(United States) A Leand	6	6
(Poland) R Baranski	0	1
(United Kingdom) J Durie	6	6
(United States) A Keller	6	6
LL	(United Kingdom) J Salmon	4	4
Q	(United States) J Smoller	1	2
4	(South Africa) R Fairbank-Nideffer	6	6
7	(United States) A Smith	6	6
(United States) T Phelps	2	3
(New Zealand) C Toleafoa	2	1
(United States) H Na	6	6
Q	(South Africa) R Field	6	6
(United States) K Gompert	4	1
(Australia) E Smylie	2	7	6
2	(Peru) L Gildemeister	6	6	3

Second round
(United States) A Leand	6	0
(United Kingdom) J Durie	7	6
(United States) A Keller	2	6	3
4	(South Africa) R Fairbank-Nideffer	6	2	6
7	(United States) A Smith	6	6
(United States) H Na	0	3
Q	(South Africa) R Field	5	3
(Australia) E Smylie	7	6

Quarterfinals
(United Kingdom) J Durie	7	6
4	(South Africa) R Fairbank-Nideffer	5	0
7	(United States) A Smith	6	7
(Australia) E Smylie	1	6

Semifinals
(United Kingdom) J Durie	6	6
7	(United States) A Smith	4	1
