= Stephanie Savides =

American tennis player

- Country (sports): United States
- Born: February 6, 1965 (age 60)
- Prize money: $17,075

Singles
- Career titles: 1 ITF
- Highest ranking: No. 263 (Feb 1, 1988)

Grand Slam singles results
- Australian Open: 1R (1988)
- Wimbledon: Q1 (1988)

Doubles
- Career titles: 1 ITF
- Highest ranking: No. 174 (Apr 25, 1988)

Grand Slam doubles results
- Australian Open: 1R (1988)
- French Open: 1R (1988)
- Wimbledon: Q2 (1988)

Stephanie Savides (born February 6, 1965) is an American former professional tennis player.

Savides was raised in Los Altos Hills, California and is of Greek descent. She played varsity tennis for Stanford University, earning All-American honors in singles and doubles. A three-time member of an NCAA championship winning team, she was also an NCAA doubles finalist in 1986.

On the professional tour, Savides reached a best singles world ranking of 263 and had a main draw appearance at the 1988 Australian Open, as a lucky loser from qualifying. She also featured at the 1988 French Open in the women's doubles and made a best doubles ranking of 174 in the world.

== ITF finals ==
=== Singles: 1 (1–0) ===
Result	Date	Tournament	Surface	Opponent	Score
Win	Nov 1987	ITF Saga, Japan	Grass	(Japan) Ei Iida	3–6, 7–6^{(4)}, 6–1

=== Doubles: 3 (1–2) ===
Result	No.	Date	Tournament	Surface	Partner	Opponents	Score
Win	1.	Jul 1985	ITF Columbus, United States	Hard	(Australia) Karen Deed	(United States) Alison Winston (Brazil) Themis Zambrzycki	6–2, 6–2
Loss	2.	Oct 1987	ITF Kuroshio, Japan	Hard	(Australia) Alison Scott	(United States) Leigh-Anne Eldredge (United States) Jill Smoller	3–6, 6–7
Loss	3.	Oct 1987	ITF Ibaraki, Japan	Hard	(Australia) Alison Scott	(Indonesia) Yayuk Basuki (Indonesia) Suzanna Wibowo	3–6, 6–4, 0–6
