= Xanthe Adams =

Australian tennis player

- Country (sports): Australia
- Born: 14 November 1968 (age 56)

Singles
- Highest ranking: No. 365 (25 Apr 1988)

Grand Slam singles results
- Australian Open: 1R (1988)

Doubles
- Highest ranking: No. 431 (6 Jun 1988)

Grand Slam doubles results
- Australian Open: 1R (1988)

Xanthe Adams (born 14 November 1968), now Xanthe Paltridge, is an Australian former professional tennis player.

Adams, competing on tour briefly during the late 1980s, reached career best rankings of 365 for singles and 431 for doubles. She featured as a wildcard in the singles main draw of the 1988 Australian Open and was beaten in the first round by Manon Bollegraf.
