= Ann Devries =

Belgian tennis player

- Country (sports): Belgium
- Born: 27 February 1970 (age 55); Bree, Belgium
- Plays: Right-handed
- Prize money: US$180,271

Singles
- Career record: 100–104
- Career titles: 1 ITF
- Highest ranking: No. 77 (7 November 1988)

Grand Slam singles results
- Australian Open: 2R (1987, 1988, 1992)
- French Open: 2R (1988)
- Wimbledon: 3R (1990)
- US Open: 2R (1987, 1988)

Doubles
- Career record: 43–59
- Career titles: 3 ITF
- Highest ranking: No. 93 (10 June 1991)

Grand Slam doubles results
- Australian Open: 2R (1988, 1989, 1991)
- French Open: 1R (1988, 1989, 1991)
- Wimbledon: 2R (1988, 1990)
- US Open: 2R (1988)

Ann Devries (born 27 February 1970) is a former professional tennis player from Belgium.

== Biography ==
Devries, a right-handed player, was born in the Flemish city of Bree. She trained in Antwerp from the age of 12, and by 15 was making her debut for the Belgium Fed Cup team. Her match against Steffi Graf in the first round of the 1986 Fed Cup was the first appearance of the then West German in the competition. Devries was a member of Belgium's World Youth Cup winning side in 1986 and won the girls' doubles title at the 1987 Australian Open with Nicole Provis.

Early in her career, she was in a relationship with top Swedish player Magnus Gustafsson.

She broke through on the WTA Tour in 1987 with singles quarterfinal appearances in four tournaments, at Auckland, Taipei, Singapore and Knokke. These efforts made her the first Belgian woman to reach the world's top 100 in singles. Her best performance came at the Sofia Open in 1988 where she made the semi-finals and three months later reached her career best ranking of 77 in the world. She made the third round of the 1990 Wimbledon Championships as a qualifier. Her run was ended by seventh seed Katerina Maleeva.

As a doubles player, she peaked at 93 in 1991, and later reached her only WTA Tour final in the doubles at the 1993 edition of the Belgian Open.

A hernia injury caused her retirement from professional tennis in 1994.

After finishing her Fed Cup playing career with a 12/13 overall record from 15 ties, she returned to captain the team from 2012 to 2016. She has also been the personal coach of several Belgian players, including Yanina Wickmayer.

== WTA career finals ==
=== Doubles: 1 (1 runner-up) ===
Result	W–L	Date	Tournament	Tier	Surface	Partner	Opponents	Score
Loss	0–1	May 1993	Belgian Open, Belgium	Tier IV	Clay	(Belgium) Dominique Monami	(Czech Republic) Radka Bobková (Argentina) María José Gaidano	4–6, 6–2, 6–7

== ITF Circuit finals ==
$50,000 tournaments
$25,000 tournaments
$10,000 tournaments

=== Singles: 4 (1–3) ===
Result	No.	Date	Tournament	Surface	Opponent	Score
Win	1.	20 October 1986	ITF Saga, Japan	Grass	(China) Yan Sun	6–1, 6–4
Loss	2.	24 June 1991	ITF Caltagirone, Italy	Clay	(Italy) Silvia Farina Elia	5–7, 3–6
Loss	3.	3 February 1992	ITF Jakarta, Indonesia	Clay	(Romania) Irina Spîrlea	3–6, 2–6
Loss	4.	26 October 1992	ITF Jakarta, Indonesia	Clay	(United States) Jennifer Santrock	6–2, 4–6, 6–7

=== Doubles: 3 (3–0) ===
Result	No.	Date	Tournament	Surface	Partner	Opponents	Score
Win	1.	26 March 1990	ITF Limoges, France	Carpet (i)	(Poland) Iwona Kuczyńska	(France) Catherine Tanvier (France) Sandrine Testud	6–3, 3–6, 6–4
Win	2.	28 September 1992	ITF Santa Maria Capua Vetere, Italy	Clay	(Romania) Irina Spîrlea	(Italy) Ginevra Mugnaini (Romania) Andreea Ehritt-Vanc	6–0, 6–0
Win	3.	6 June 1994	ITF Elvas, Portugal	Hard	(Portugal) Sofia Prazeres	(Austria) Désirée Leupold (Spain) Janet Souto	6–2, 4–6, 7–5
