= Elizabeth Galphin =

American tennis player

- Country (sports): United States
- Born: August 26, 1968 (age 56)
- Prize money: $50,062

Singles
- Highest ranking: No. 185 (May 9, 1988)

Grand Slam singles results
- Australian Open: 2R (1988)
- French Open: Q2 (1988)
- Wimbledon: Q1 (1988)

Doubles
- Highest ranking: No. 225 (Apr 25, 1988)

Grand Slam doubles results
- Australian Open: 1R (1988, 1989)
- Wimbledon: Q3 (1988)

Elizabeth Galphin (born August 26, 1968) is an American former professional tennis player.

Galphin, ranked as high as 185 in the world, had a third round appearance at the 1987 Argentine Open, beating seeded player Christiane Jolissaint en route. She featured in the singles main draw of the 1988 Australian Open and won her first round match against Paula Smith. Her son Milledge Cossu is a tennis player, currently for Purdue University.

== ITF finals ==
=== Singles: 2 (0–2) ===
Result	No.	Date	Tournament	Surface	Opponent	Score
Loss	1.	May 1987	Bath, United Kingdom	Clay	(Spain) María José Llorca	1–6, 6–3, 1–6
Loss	2.	Jul 1987	Spartanburg, United States	Clay	(Netherlands) Ingelise Driehuis	2–6, 4–6

=== Doubles: 1 (0–1) ===
Result	No.	Date	Tournament	Surface	Partner	Opponents	Score
Loss	1.	Nov 1989	Pforzheim, West Germany	Hard	(West Germany) Caroline Schneider	(Soviet Union) Elena Bryukhovets (Soviet Union) Eugenia Maniokova	1–6, 1–6
