= 1990 Volvo Hall of Fame Tennis Championships and the Virginia Slims of Newport =

1990 Hall of Fame Tennis Championships and Virginia Slims of Newport
- Date: July 9–15 (men); July 16–22 (women)
- Edition: 15th (men) / 12th (women)
- Category: World Series (men); Tier III (women)
- Prize money: $150,000 (men) $225,000 (women)
- Surface: Grass / outdoor
- Location: Newport, Rhode Island, US

Champions

Men's singles
- (South Africa) Pieter Aldrich

Women's singles
- (Spain) Arantxa Sánchez Vicario

Men's doubles
- (Australia) Darren Cahill / (Australia) Mark Kratzmann

Women's doubles
- (South Africa) Lise Gregory / (United States) Gretchen Magers
- Hall of Fame Tennis Championships Virginia Slims of Newport

The 1990 Volvo Hall of Fame Tennis Championships and 1990 Virginia Slims of Newport were tennis tournaments played on grass courts at the International Tennis Hall of Fame in Newport, Rhode Island, in the United States that were part of the World Series of the 1990 ATP Tour and of the Tier III category of the 1990 WTA Tour. The men's tournament was held from July 9 through July 15, 1990, while the women's tournament was held from July 16 through July 22, 1990. Pieter Aldrich and Arantxa Sánchez Vicario won the singles titles.

== Finals ==
=== Men's singles ===
(South Africa) Pieter Aldrich defeated (Sweden) Peter Lundgren 7–6^{(12–10)}, 1–6, 6–1

- It was Aldrin's only singles title of his career.

=== Women's singles ===
(Spain) Arantxa Sánchez Vicario defeated (United Kingdom) Jo Durie 7–6^{(7–2)}, 4–6, 7–5

- It was Sánchez Vicario's 2nd and last singles title of the year and the 5th of her career.

=== Men's doubles ===
(Australia) Darren Cahill / (Australia) Mark Kratzmann defeated (United States) Todd Nelsonn / (United States) Bryan Shelton 7–6, 6–2

- It was Cahill's 2nd doubles title of the year and the 11th of his career. It was Kratzmann's only title of the year and the 1st of his career.

=== Women's doubles ===
(South Africa) Lise Gregory / (United States) Gretchen Magers defeated (United States) Patty Fendick / (United States) Anne Smith 7–6^{(9–7)}, 6–1

- It was Gregory's 1st doubles title of the year and the 4th of her career. It was Magers's first doubles title of her career.
