= 1988 Cincinnati Open =

- Date: August 1–7, 1988 (women's); August 15–21, 1988 (men's)
- Edition: 87th
- Surface: Hard / outdoor
- Location: Mason, Ohio, U.S.
- Venue: Lindner Family Tennis Center

Champions

Men's singles
- (Sweden) Mats Wilander

Women's singles
- (United States) Barbara Potter

Men's doubles
- (United States) Rick Leach / (United States) Jim Pugh

Women's doubles
- (United States) Beth Herr / (United States) Candy Reynolds
- Cincinnati Open

The 1988 Cincinnati Open, also known as the Thriftway ATP Championships and Pringles Light Classic for sponsorship reasons, was a tennis tournament played on outdoor hard courts at the Lindner Family Tennis Center in Mason, Ohio, United States that was part of the 1988 Nabisco Grand Prix and 1988 WTA Tour. The women's draw was held from August 1 through August 7, 1988, while the men's draw was held from August 15 through August 21, 1988. Mats Wilander and Barbara Potter won the singles titles.

== Finals ==
=== Men's singles ===
(Sweden) Mats Wilander defeated (Sweden) Stefan Edberg, 3–6, 7–6^{(7–5)}, 7–6^{(7–5)}

- It was Wilander's 4th singles title of the year and the 30th of his career.

=== Women's singles ===
(United States) Barbara Potter defeated (Canada) Helen Kelesi, 6–2, 6–2

=== Men's doubles ===
(United States) Rick Leach / (United States) Jim Pugh defeated (United States) Jim Grabb / (United States) Patrick McEnroe, 6–2, 6–4

=== Women's doubles ===
(United States) Beth Herr / (United States) Candy Reynolds defeated (United States) Lindsay Bartlett / (Canada) Helen Kelesi, 6–2, 6–4
