= Molly Van Nostrand =

American tennis player

- Country (sports): United States
- Born: March 12, 1965 (age 61) West Islip, New York, USA
- Turned pro: 1983
- Retired: 1989
- Plays: Right-handed (two-handed backhand)
- Prize money: US$ 183,634

Singles
- Career record: 42–70
- Career titles: 0
- Highest ranking: No. 37 (January 20, 1986)

Grand Slam singles results
- Australian Open: 1R (1985, 1987)
- French Open: 1R (1984, 1987)
- Wimbledon: QF (1985)
- US Open: 2R (1985, 1986)

Doubles
- Career record: 51–64
- Career titles: 0
- Highest ranking: No. 43 (February 29, 1988)

Grand Slam doubles results
- Australian Open: 2R (1989)
- French Open: 2R (1987)
- Wimbledon: QF (1986)
- US Open: 2R (1987)

Grand Slam mixed doubles results
- French Open: 1R (1984)
- Wimbledon: 3R (1988)

Molly Van Nostrand (born March 12, 1965) is a retired American professional tennis player.

== Career ==
Van Nostrand turned professional in 1983. Her best Grand Slam performance was reaching the quarterfinals at Wimbledon in 1985. She had career wins over Natasha Zvereva, Helena Suková, Manuela Maleeva, Wendy Turnbull, and Dianne Fromholtz. She reached a career-high ranking of World No. 37 in 1986. She retired in 1989. She is the younger sister of the late John Van Nostrand, who was also a professional tennis player. Van Nostrand was coached by her father, Kingdon Van Nostrand.

== WTA Tour finals ==
=== Singles: 1 (0–1) ===
Winner — Legend Grand Slam tournaments (0–0) WTA Tour Championships (0–0) Virginia Slims (0–1)	Titles by surface Hard (0–1) Grass (0–0) Clay (0–0) Carpet (0–0)

Outcome	No.	Date	Tournament	Surface	Opponent	Score
Runner-up	1.	Aug 1986	Mahwah	Hard	(West Germany) Steffi Graf	7–5, 6–1

=== Doubles: 1 (0–1) ===
Winner - Legend Grand Slam tournaments (0–0) WTA Tour Championships (0–0) Virginia Slims (0–1)	Titles by surface Hard (0–0) Grass (0–0) Clay (0–0) Carpet (0–1)

Outcome	No.	Date	Tournament	Surface	Partner	Opponents	Score
Runner-up	1.	Mar 1985	Indianapolis	Carpet	(South Africa) Jennifer Mundel	(United States) Elise Burgin (United States) Kathleen Horvath	6–4, 6–1

== Grand Slam singles tournament timeline ==
Key
W	F	SF	QF	#R	RR	Q#	DNQ	A	NH

(W) winner; (F) finalist; (SF) semifinalist; (QF) quarterfinalist; (#R) rounds 4, 3, 2, 1; (RR) round-robin stage; (Q#) qualification round; (DNQ) did not qualify; (A) absent; (NH) not held; (SR) strike rate (events won / competed); (W–L) win–loss record.

Tournament	1983	1984	1985	1986	1987	1988	1989	Career SR
Australian Open	A	Q2	1R	NH	1R	A	Q1	0 / 2
French Open	A	1R	A	A	1R	A	A	0 / 2
Wimbledon	A	Q1	QF	1R	1R	Q2	1R	0 / 4
US Open	A	Q1	2R	2R	1R	A	1R	0 / 4
SR	0 / 0	0 / 1	0 / 3	0 / 2	0 / 4	0 / 0	0 / 2	0 / 12
Year End Ranking	NR	112	44	62	142	239	111	
