= Sally McCann =

Australian tennis player

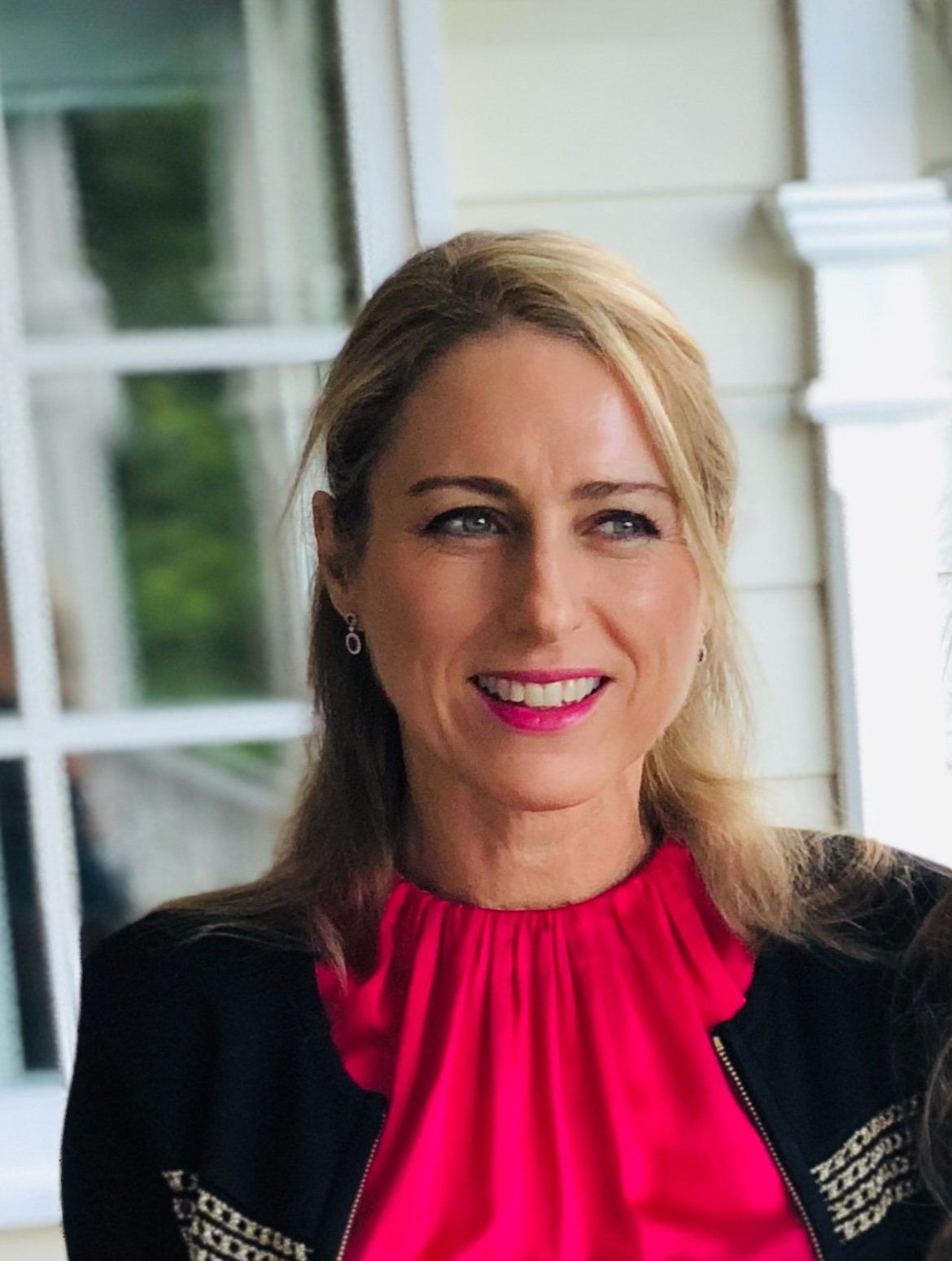
- Country (sports): Australia
- Born: 30 April 1969 (age 55)
- Prize money: $27,069

Singles
- Career titles: 3 ITF
- Highest ranking: No. 208 (28 March 1988)

Grand Slam singles results
- Australian Open: 2R (1988), 1R (1987, 1989)
- Wimbledon: Q2 (1988)

Doubles
- Career titles: 2 ITF
- Highest ranking: No. 229 (3 July 1989)

Grand Slam doubles results
- Australian Open: 1R (1988, 1989)

Sally McCann (born 30 April 1969) is an Australian former professional tennis player.

McCann, an AIS trained player from Brisbane, was a junior doubles finalist at the 1985 Australian Open.

While competing on the professional tour she reached a best singles ranking of 208 in the world, winning three ITF satellite tournaments. She made the second round of the 1988 Australian Open, with a win over Brenda Schultz.

== ITF finals ==
=== Singles: 5 (3–2) ===
| Outcome | No. | Date | Tournament | Surface | Opponent | Score |
|---|---|---|---|---|---|---|
| Winner | 1. | 6 March 1988 | Bendigo, Australia | Grass | (Australia) Kristine Kunce | 3–6, 6–2, 6–0 |
| Winner | 2. | 13 March 1988 | Canberra, Australia | Grass | (Australia) Bilynda Potter | 6–4, 3–6, 6–4 |
| Winner | 3. | 19 February 1989 | Adelaide, Australia | Hard | (Australia) Tracey Morton | 6–3, 6–1 |
| Runner-up | 1. | 5 March 1989 | Canberra, Australia | Grass | (Australia) Janine Thompson | 4–6, 3–6 |
| Runner-up | 2. | 12 March 1989 | Bendigo, Australia | Grass | (Australia) Janine Thompson | 3–6, 3–6 |

=== Doubles: 4 (2–2) ===
| Outcome | No. | Date | Tournament | Surface | Partner | Opponents | Score |
|---|---|---|---|---|---|---|---|
| Runner-up | 1. | 6 December 1987 | Sydney, Australia | Grass | (Australia) Kristine Kunce | (Australia) Jo-Anne Faull (Australia) Rachel McQuillan | 3–6, 2–6 |
| Winner | 1. | 24 July 1988 | Subiaco, Italy | Clay | (Australia) Kristine Kunce | (Italy) Giovanna Carotenuto (Switzerland) Cristina Casini | 3–6, 7–5, 6–3 |
| Winner | 2. | 26 February 1989 | Melbourne, Australia | Hard | (Australia) Janine Thompson | (Australia) Rennae Stubbs (Australia) Kate McDonald | 6–3, 6–2 |
| Runner-up | 2. | 12 March 1989 | Newcastle, Australia | Grass | (Australia) Janine Thompson | (Australia) Rennae Stubbs (Australia) Kate McDonald | 6–7^{(5–7)}, 6–4, 3–6 |
