= Jill Smoller =

American tennis player and sports agent

- Country (sports): United States
- Born: September 4, 1964 (age 60)
- Prize money: $105,337

Singles
- Career record: 35–61

Grand Slam singles results
- Australian Open: 1R (1988, 1990)
- Wimbledon: 1R (1989)

Doubles
- Career record: 80–98

Grand Slam doubles results
- Australian Open: 3R (1989)
- French Open: 2R (1989)
- Wimbledon: 1R (1988, 89, 90, 91, 92)
- US Open: 1R (1989, 1990, 1991)

Jill Smoller (born September 4, 1964) is an American sports agent and former professional tennis player.

Considered a pioneer for women sports agents, Smoller started her career in the late 1990s and counts Allyson Felix and Serena Williams as some of her clients.

As a tennis player she competed in college tennis for the Arizona Wildcats, before going on to tour professionally and featuring in the main draw of all four grand slam tournaments.

== ITF finals ==
Legend
$10,000 tournaments

=== Doubles: 4 (3–1) ===
Result	No.	Date	Tournament	Surface	Partner	Opponents	Score
Win	1.	March 16, 1987	Tucson, United States	Hard	(United States) Jennifer Fuchs	(United States) Lindsay Bartlett (United States) Linley Tanner	6–0, 6–4
Win	2.	October 12, 1987	Kuroshio, Japan	Hard	(United States) Leigh Anne Eldredge	(United States) Stephanie Savides (Australia) Alison Scott	6–3, 7–6
Loss	1.	November 1, 1987	Matsuyama, Japan	Hard	(United States) Jennifer Fuchs	(Indonesia) Yayuk Basuki (Indonesia) Suzanna Wibowo	4–6, 6–3, 1–6
Win	3.	February 1, 1988	Jönköping, Sweden	Carpet	(United States) Jennifer Fuchs	(Sweden) Jonna Jonerup (Sweden) Maria Strandlund	6–2, 6–4
