= Jennifer Fuchs =

American tennis player

- Full name: Jennifer Fuchs
- Country (sports): United States
- Born: July 2, 1967 (age 57)
- Prize money: $63,122

Singles
- Career record: 56–60
- Highest ranking: No. 206 (January 17, 1983)

Grand Slam singles results
- Australian Open: 1R (1988, 1989)

Doubles
- Career record: 97–70
- Highest ranking: No. 113 (February 13, 1989)

Grand Slam doubles results
- Australian Open: 3R (1989)
- French Open: 2R (1991)
- Wimbledon: 1R (1989)
- US Open: 1R (1990, 1992)

Jennifer Fuchs (born July 2, 1967) is a former professional tennis player from the United States.

== Biography ==
Fuchs grew up in Long Island, New York and began to play tennis at the age of nine. She went to University of California, Los Angeles on a full scholarship, where she played collegiate tennis for two years before turning professional in 1987.

Fuchs made the 1988 Australian Open as a qualifier and was beaten in the first round by 13th seed Catarina Lindqvist. She suffered a serious shoulder injury during a tour of Italy in 1988 after being struck by a car while walking on the side of the road. The injury didn't keep her off the circuit for long but would cause issues throughout her career. In 1989 she qualified for the Australian Open singles main draw a second time.

As a doubles player she appeared in all four grand slam tournaments during her career, with her best performance a round of 16 appearance at the 1989 Australian Open. She was a semi-finalist in the doubles at the 1991 Puerto Rico Open, with regular doubles partner Maria Strandlund.

The shoulder injury, which had undergone four surgeries over five years, caused her to retire from professional tennis in 1993.

Since 1999 she has been the Director of Tennis at El Conquistador in Oro Valley, Arizona where she has worked with other greats such as Michael Klein and Joshua Lee.
