= Kristine Kunce =

Australian tennis player

- Full name: Kristine Kunce Radford
- Country (sports): Australia
- Born: 3 March 1970 (age 56) Sydney, Australia
- Height: 177 cm (5 ft 9 1/2 in)
- Turned pro: 1985
- Retired: 30 January 2000
- Plays: Right-handed
- Prize money: $700,961

Singles
- Career record: 230–200
- Highest ranking: No. 45 (15 August 1994)

Grand Slam singles results
- Australian Open: 3R (1994)
- French Open: 1R (1993, 1994)
- Wimbledon: 4R (1994)
- US Open: 2R (1993)

Doubles
- Career record: 297–199
- Career titles: 6
- Highest ranking: No. 25 (19 September 1994)

Kristine Kunce (née Radford; born 3 March 1970) is a former professional tennis player from Australia who competed during the mid-1980s through the 1990s.

Kunce reached a career-high ranking of world No. 45 on 15 August 1994, and a career high in doubles of 25 on 19 September 1994. She won six doubles titles on the WTA Tour during her career.

Her best performance at a Grand Slam was at the 1994 Wimbledon Championships, where she was knocked out in the fourth round by eventual champion Conchita Martínez.

== WTA Tour finals ==
=== Doubles: 13 (6 titles, 7 runner-ups) ===
Legend
Tier I (0)
Tier II (0)
Tier III (0)
Tier IV (6)

Result	W/L	Date	Tournament	Surface	Partners	Opponents	Score
Loss	0–1	Apr 1993	Malaysian Open	Hard (i)	(United States) Nicole Arendt	(United States) Patty Fendick (United States) Meredith McGrath	4–6, 6–7^{(2–7)}
Win	1–1	Apr 1993	Jakarta, Indonesia	Hard	(United States) Nicole Arendt	(United States) Amy deLone (United States) Erika deLone	6–3, 6–4
Loss	1–2	Oct 1993	Taipei Open, Taiwan	Hard	(Australia) Jo-Anne Faull	(Indonesia) Yayuk Basuki (Japan) Nana Miyagi	4–6, 2–6
Loss	1–3	Apr 1994	Kallang, Singapore	Hard	(United States) Nicole Arendt	(United States) Patty Fendick (United States) Meredith McGrath	4–6, 2–6
Win	2–3	Apr 1994	Jakarta, Indonesia	Hard	(United States) Nicole Arendt	(Australia) Kerry-Anne Guse (Czech Republic) Andrea Strnadová	6–2, 6–2
Loss	2–4	Jun 1995	Birmingham Classic, UK	Grass	(Australia) Nicole Bradtke	(Netherlands) Manon Bollegraf (Australia) Rennae Stubbs	6–3, 4–6, 4–6
Win	3–4	Sep 1995	Nagoya, Japan	Carpet (i)	(Australia) Kerry-Anne Guse	(South Korea) Park Sung-hee (Japan) Rika Hiraki	6–4, 6–4
Win	4–4	Nov 1995	Pattaya Open, Thailand	Hard	(Canada) Jill Hetherington	(Australia) Kristin Godridge (Japan) Nana Miyagi	2–6, 6–4, 6–3
Loss	4–5	Jan 1996	Auckland Open, New Zealand	Hard	(Canada) Jill Hetherington	(Belgium) Els Callens (France) Julie Halard-Decugis	1–6, 0–6
Win	5–5	Apr 1997	Jakarta, Indonesia	Hard	(Australia) Kerry-Anne Guse	(Czech Republic) Lenka Němečková (Japan) Yuka Yoshida	6–4, 5–7, 7–5
Win	6–5	Sep 1997	Pattaya Open, Thailand	Hard	(United States) Corina Morariu	(Argentina) Florencia Labat (Belgium) Dominique Monami	6–3, 6–4
Loss	6–6	Feb 1998	Memphis Cup, US	Hard	(Romania) Cătălina Cristea	(United States) Serena Williams (United States) Venus Williams	7–5, 6–2
Loss	6–7	Sep 1995	Australian Hardcourts	Hard	(Romania) Irina Spîrlea	(United States) Corina Morariu (Latvia) Larisa Neiland	6–3, 6–3

== ITF finals ==
=== Singles (6–6) ===
Legend
$75,000 tournaments
$50,000 tournaments
$25,000 tournaments
$10,000 tournaments

Result	No.	Date	Tournament	Surface	Opponent	Score
Loss	1.	6 December 1987	Sydney, Australia	Grass	(Australia) Rachel McQuillan	4–6, 6–4, 3–6
Loss	2.	6 March 1988	Bendigo, Australia	Grass	(Australia) Sally McCann	6–3, 2–6, 0–6
Loss	3.	1 August 1988	Franceville, Italy	Clay	(Czechoslovakia) Eva Švíglerová	3–6, 5–7
Win	1.	14 August 1988	Virginia Beach, United States	Hard	(United States) Tami Whitlinger	7–5, 2–6, 6–2
Win	2.	21 October 1990	Kyoto, Japan	Hard	(Japan) Rika Hiraki	6–7, 6–3, 6–3
Win	3.	29 October 1990	Saga, Japan	Grass	(Israel) Yael Segal	6–3, 7–5
Win	4.	24 February 1991	Wodonga, Australia	Grass	(Australia) Ros Balodis	6–1, 4–6, 6–3
Loss	4.	21 October 1991	Oita, Japan	Hard	(China) Li Fang	3–6, 0–6
Loss	5.	16 March 1992	Canberra, Australia	Grass	(New Zealand) Julie Richardson	2–6, 0–6
Win	5.	11 March 1996	Canberra, Australia	Grass	(Thailand) Tamarine Tanasugarn	6–4, 6–0
Loss	6.	18 March 1996	Wodonga, Australia	Grass	(Thailand) Tamarine Tanasugarn	6–4, 4–6, 6–7
Win	6.	25 March 1996	New South Wales, Australia	Grass	(Thailand) Tamarine Tanasugarn	6–2, 6–1

=== Doubles (15–16) ===
Result	No.	Date	Tournament	Surface	Partner	Opponents	Score
Loss	1.	22 June 1987	ITF Francavilla, Italy	Clay	(Australia) Michelle Bowrey	(Australia) Kate McDonald (West Germany) Martina Pawlik	4–6, 3–6
Win	1.	29 June 1987	Brindisi, Italy	Clay	(Australia) Michelle Bowrey	(Spain) Rosa Bielsa (Spain) Elena Guerra	6–3, 7–6
Loss	2.	6 December 1987	Sydney, Australia	Grass	(Australia) Sally McCann	(Australia) Jo-Anne Faull (Australia) Rachel McQuillan	3–6, 2–6
Win	2.	24 July 1988	Subiaco, Italy	Clay	(Australia) Sally McCann	(Italy) Giovanna Carotenuto (Switzerland) Cristina Casini	3–6, 7–5, 6–3
Win	3.	8 August 1988	York, United States	Hard	(New Zealand) Belinda Cordwell	(United States) Allyson Ingram (United States) Jennifer Young	6–3, 6–1
Loss	3.	21 August 1988	Chatham, United States	Hard	(Australia) Sharon McNamara	(United States) Sandra Birch (United States) Jessica Emmons	0–6, 7–6, 3–6
Loss	4.	10 April 1989	Palermo, Italy	Clay	(Australia) Rachel McQuillan	(Italy) Marzia Grossi (Italy) Barbara Romanò	3–6, 2–6
Win	4.	30 April 1989	Verona, Italy	Clay	(Australia) Rachel McQuillan	(Australia) Kate McDonald (Australia) Janine Thompson	5–7, 6–4, 6–0
Loss	5.	25 September 1989	Chicago, United States	Hard	(France) Sophie Amiach	(United States) Mary-Lou Daniels (United States) Candy Reynolds	3–6, 3–6
Win	5.	19 November 1989	Gold Coast, Australia	Hard	(Australia) Kate McDonald	(Australia) Louise Stacey (Australia) Jane Taylor	6–4, 6–2
Win	6.	7 October 1990	Tokyo, Japan	Hard	(Australia) Kerry-Anne Guse	(Japan) Rika Hiraki (Japan) Yasuyo Kajita	4–6, 6–1, 7–5
Win	7.	14 October 1990	Matsuyama, Japan	Clay	(Australia) Kerry-Anne Guse	(Australia) Angie Cunningham (Australia) Catherine Barclay	6–7, 6–3, ret.
Win	8.	21 October 1990	Kyoto, Japan	Hard	(Australia) Kerry-Anne Guse	(Japan) Rika Hiraki (Japan) Yasuyo Kajita	6–3, 6–4
Loss	6.	28 October 1990	Nagasaki, Japan	Hard	(Australia) Kerry-Anne Guse	(Indonesia) Yayuk Basuki (Indonesia) Suzanna Wibowo	2–6, 6–7^{(8)}
Loss	7.	4 November 1990	Saga, Japan	Grass	(Australia) Kerry-Anne Guse	(Indonesia) Yayuk Basuki (Indonesia) Suzanna Wibowo	3–6, 2–6
Win	9.	17 February 1991	Mildura, Australia	Grass	(Australia) Clare Thompson	(Mexico) Lupita Novelo (United States) Betsy Somerville	7–6, 6–2
Loss	8.	18 February 1991	Wodonga, Australia	Grass	(Australia) Clare Thompson	(Australia) Tracey Morton-Rodgers (Australia) Alison Scott	4–6, 6–4, 6–7
Loss	9.	4 March 1991	Broadmeadows, Australia	Grass	(Australia) Clare Thompson	(Mexico) Lupita Novelo (United States) Betsy Somerville	2–6, 5–7
Win	10.	21 October 1991	Ōita, Japan	Hard	(Mexico) Lupita Novelo	(Sweden) Maria Ekstrand (Germany) Sabine Lohmann	6–1, 7–5
Win	11.	30 September 1991	Saga, Japan	Grass	(Mexico) Lupita Novelo	(Hong Kong) Tang Min (China) Li Fang	5–7, 6–2, 7–5
Win	12.	4 November 1991	Chiba, Japan	Hard	(Mexico) Lupita Novelo	(Japan) Ayako Hirose (Japan) Yone Kamio	6–4, 5–7, 6–4
Loss	10.	9 March 1992	Wodonga, Australia	Gras	(Australia) Danielle Jones	(New Zealand) Julie Richardson (New Zealand) Amanda Trail	4–6, 4–6
Loss	11.	16 March 1992	Canberra, Australia	Gras	(Australia) Danielle Jones	(New Zealand) Julie Richardson (New Zealand) Amanda Trail	3–6, 3–6
Win	13.	27 April 1992	Jakarta, Indonesia	Clay	(Australia) Kerry-Anne Guse	(Australia) Tracey Morton-Rodgers (New Zealand) Julie Richardson	7–6, 6–2
Win	14.	26 October 1992	Jakarta, Indonesia	Clay	(Australia) Michelle Jaggard-Lai	(Australia) Kristin Godridge (Australia) Nicole Pratt	3–6, 6–3, 6–2
Loss	12.	20 December 1992	Brisbane, Australia	Grass	(Australia) Kerry-Anne Guse	(Australia) Angie Cunningham (Australia) Justine Hodder	4–6, 6–3, 2–6
Loss	13.	8 June 1997	Surbiton, United Kingdom	Grass	(United States) Debbie Graham	(Australia) Catherine Barclay (Australia) Kerry-Anne Guse	6–3, 4–6, 6–7
Loss	14.	4 August 1997	Jakarta, Indonesia	Clay	(Australia) Kerry-Anne Guse	(South Korea) Choi Young-ja (South Korea) Kim Eun-ha	3–6, 4–6
Win	15.	19 October 1997	Indian Wells, United States	Hard	(Australia) Rachel McQuillan	(Australia) Lisa McShea (South Africa) Nannie de Villiers	7–5, 6–4
Loss	15.	26 October 1997	Houston, United States	Hard	(United States) Ginger Helgeson-Nielsen	(Australia) Rachel McQuillan (Japan) Nana Smith	0–6, 6–3, 2–6
Loss	16.	26 September 1999	ITF Kirkland, United States	Hard	(Australia) Rachel McQuillan	(United States) Debbie Graham (Japan) Nana Smith	3–6, 1–6
