= Karen Hunter (tennis) =

British tennis player

- Full name: Karen Hunter-Whishaw
- Country (sports): United Kingdom
- Born: 26 August 1968 (age 56)
- Prize money: $15,168

Singles
- Highest ranking: No. 332 (18 Jul 1988)

Grand Slam singles results
- Wimbledon: 1R (1988)

Doubles
- Highest ranking: No. 261 (14 Sep 1987)

Grand Slam doubles results
- Wimbledon: 1R (1987)

Karen Hunter-Whishaw (born 26 August 1968) is a British former professional tennis player.

Hunter, ranked as high as 332 in the world, won her way through qualifying at the 1988 Wimbledon Championships, beating Veronika Martinek, Sam Smith and Karine Quentrec. She was beaten in the first round by Karen Schimper.
