= Clare Thompson =

Australian tennis player (born 1963)

- Country (sports): Australia
- Born: 6 November 1963 (age 62)
- Prize money: $42,283

Singles
- Career titles: 1 ITF
- Highest ranking: No. 299 (18 July 1988)

Grand Slam singles results
- Australian Open: 1R (1988)

Doubles
- Career titles: 1 ITF
- Highest ranking: No. 179 (25 March 1991)

Grand Slam doubles results
- Australian Open: 1R (1988, 1989, 1991)

Clare Thompson (born 10 June 1963) is an Australian former professional tennis player.

Thompson spent the early years of her career in the United States, playing college tennis for the United States International University, which was based in San Diego.

Her professional career included an appearance at the 1988 Australian Open, where she received a wildcard into the main draw and played Janine Tremelling in the first round, with the winner to face top seed Steffi Graf. Thompson was beaten by Tremelling in three sets.

== ITF finals ==
$25,000 tournaments
$10,000 tournaments

=== Singles: 2 (1–1) ===
Outcome	No.	Date	Tournament	Surface	Opponent	Score
Runner-up	1.	25 February 1991	ITF Canberra, Australia	Grass	(Australia) Joanne Limmer	5–7, 4–6
Winner	1.	4 March 1991	ITF Broadmeadows, Australia	Grass	(Australia) Tracey Morton-Rodgers	6–3, 6–2

=== Doubles: 5 (1–4) ===
Outcome	No.	Date	Tournament	Surface	Partner	Opponents	Score
Winner	1.	11 February 1991	ITF Mildura, Australia	Grass	(Australia) Kristine Kunce	(Mexico) Lupita Novelo (United States) Betsy Somerville	7–6, 6–2
Runner-up	1.	18 February 1991	ITF Wodonga, Australia	Grass	(Australia) Kristine Kunce	(Australia) Tracey Morton-Rodgers (Australia) Alison Scott	4–6, 6–4, 6–7
Runner-up	2.	4 March 1991	ITF Broadmeadows, Australia	Grass	(Australia) Kristine Kunce	(Mexico) Lupita Novelo (United States) Betsy Somerville	2–6, 5–7
Runner-up	3.	29 June 1992	ITF Ronneby, Sweden	Clay	(Australia) Robyn Mawdsley	(Sweden) Catarina Bernstein (Sweden) Annika Narbe	5–7, 0–6
Runner-up	4.	20 July 1992	ITF Bilbao, Spain	Clay	(United States) Jessica Emmons	(Spain) Virginia Ruano Pascual (Switzerland) Eva Bes	2–6, 4–6
