= Carol Christian (tennis) =

American tennis player

- Full name: Carol Pat Christian
- Country (sports): United States
- Born: November 9, 1962 (age 63)
- Prize money: $56,812

Singles
- Highest ranking: No. 111 (August 1, 1988)

Grand Slam singles results
- Australian Open: 3R (1988)
- French Open: 1R (1988)
- US Open: 1R (1988)

Doubles

Grand Slam doubles results
- Australian Open: 2R (1989)
- French Open: 1R (1984)
- US Open: 1R (1984)

Carol Pat Christian (born 1962) is an American former professional tennis player.

== Biography ==
Christian grew up in San Bernardino, California and while at Pacific High School won back to back Southern Section doubles titles, with Pat Shellhammer.

=== Collegiate tennis ===
In 1980 and 1981, Christian played collegiate women's tennis at Cal State Fullerton for Titans Head Coach Jan Billings.

=== Professional tennis ===
As a professional player she reached a best singles ranking of 111 in the world. Her best performance in a grand slam tournament was a third round appearance at the 1988 Australian Open. Christian had a WTA professional record of 45 wins and 47 losses during her career.
