= Jane Thomas (tennis) =

American tennis player

- Full name: Jane Thomas
- Country (sports): United States
- Born: March 24, 1966 (age 60)
- Prize money: $44,738

Singles
- Career record: 41–62
- Highest ranking: No. 244 (January 30, 1989)

Doubles
- Career record: 42–53
- Highest ranking: No. 106 (October 9, 1989)

Grand Slam doubles results
- Australian Open: 1R (1988, 1989)
- French Open: 1R (1988, 1989, 1990)
- Wimbledon: 1R (1989)
- US Open: 1R (1989)

Jane Thomas (born March 24, 1966) is a former professional tennis player from the United States.

== Biography ==
Thomas, who grew up in Washington State, played tennis for the UCLA Bruins and was a three-time All-American. She won the 1987 Pac-10 singles championship.

From 1987 to 1990, she competed on the professional tour. As a doubles player she featured in the main draw of all four grand slam tournaments in 1989, reaching her best ranking that year of 106 in the world.
