= Alison Scott =

Australian tennis player (born 1968)

- Country (sports): Australia
- Born: 8 February 1968 (age 57)
- Prize money: $71,344

Singles
- Career titles: 0
- Highest ranking: No. 178 (18 July 1988)

Grand Slam singles results
- Australian Open: 2R (1987)

Doubles
- Career titles: 2 ITF
- Highest ranking: No. 93 (7 November 1988)

Grand Slam doubles results
- Australian Open: QF (1988)
- French Open: 2R (1990)
- Wimbledon: 2R (1988, 1991)
- US Open: 2R (1989)

Alison Scott (born 8 February 1968) is an Australian former professional tennis player.

== Biography ==
Born 8 February 1968, Scott grew up in Canberra and developed her tennis at the Australian Institute of Sport on a scholarship, before going on to compete on the WTA Tour. She was a girls' doubles finalist at the 1985 Australian Open.

As a professional player she reached the top 100 in doubles, peaking at 93 in the world in 1988. She featured in the doubles main draws of all four grand slam tournaments, with her best performance a quarter-final appearance at the 1988 Australian Open, partnering Maria Lindström.

== ITF finals ==
$25,000 tournaments
$10,000 tournaments

=== Doubles: 10 (2–8) ===
Result	No.	Date	Tournament	Surface	Partner	Opponents	Score
Loss	1.	23 June 1986	ITF Seabrook, United States	Clay	(Australia) Michelle Turk	(Netherlands) Manon Bollegraf (South Africa) Lise Gregory	2–6, 1–6
Loss	2.	14 July 1986	ITF Midland, United States	Clay	(New Zealand) Ruth Seeman	(United States) Katrina Adams (United States) Sonia Hahn	6–2, 3–6, 4–6
Win	1.	16 March 1987	ITF Canberra, Australia	Hard	(Australia) Colleen Carney	(Australia) Karen Deed (Australia) Bilynda Potter	7–5, 7–6
Loss	3.	30 March 1987	ITF Adelaide, Australia	Hard	(Australia) Colleen Carney	(Australia) Louise Field (New Zealand) Belinda Cordwell	1–6, 6–1, 4–6
Loss	4.	13 July 1987	ITF Erlangen, West Germany	Clay	(Austria) Heidi Sprung	(Czechoslovakia) Denisa Krajčovičová (France) Virginie Paquet	1–6, 2–6
Loss	5.	12 October 1987	ITF Kuroshio, Japan	Hard	(United States) Stephanie Savides	(United States) Leigh Anne Eldredge (United States) Jill Smoller	3–6, 6–7
Loss	6.	25 October 1987	ITF Ibaraki, Japan	Hard	(United States) Stephanie Savides	(Indonesia) Yayuk Basuki (Indonesia) Suzanna Wibowo	3–6, 6–4, 0–6
Loss	7.	21 November 1988	ITF Adelaide, Australia	Hard	(Australia) Louise Field	(Australia) Jo-Anne Faull (Australia) Rachel McQuillan	5–7, 4–6
Win	2.	18 February 1991	ITF Wodonga, Australia	Grass	(Australia) Tracey Morton-Rodgers	(Australia) Kristine Kunce (Australia) Clare Thompson	6–4, 4–6, 7–6
Loss	8.	25 February 1991	ITF Canberra, Australia	Grass	(Australia) Tracey Morton-Rodgers	(Mexico) Lupita Novelo (United States) Betsy Somerville	5–7, 6–3, 4–6
