= Yukie Koizumi =

Japanese tennis player (born 1958)

- Country (sports): Japan
- Born: 24 January 1958 (age 67)
- Prize money: $61,911

Singles
- Career record: 101–100
- Highest ranking: No. 159 (30 January 1989)

Grand Slam singles results
- Australian Open: 2R (1987, 1989)
- French Open: Q2 (1987)
- Wimbledon: Q3 (1988)
- US Open: Q1 (1987, 1988)

Doubles
- Career record: 37–64
- Highest ranking: No. 172 (19 December 1988)

Grand Slam doubles results
- Australian Open: 1R (1988, 1989)
- French Open: 1R (1988)
- Wimbledon: 1R (1988)

Yukie Koizumi (born 24 January 1958) is a Japanese former professional tennis player.

Koizumi reached a best singles ranking of 159 in the world and featured three times in the main draw of the Australian Open. In the 1989 edition she upset ninth seed Lori McNeil in the first round. As a doubles player she also played in the main draws of the French Open and Wimbledon.

== ITF finals ==
=== Singles: 1 (0–1) ===
Outcome	Date	Tournament	Surface	Opponent	Score
Runner-up	21 October 1985	Saga, Japan	Hard	(China) Li Xinyi	6–2, 6–3

=== Doubles: 1 (1–0) ===
Outcome	Date	Tournament	Surface	Partner	Opponents	Score
Winner	30 September 1991	Hokkaido, Japan	Hard	(Japan) Miki Mizokuchi	(China) Tang Min (China) Li Fang	6–1, 3–6, 6–3
