= Tina Mochizuki =

American tennis player

- Full name: Tina Karwasky (nee Watanabe)
- Country (sports): United States
- Born: November 24, 1952 (age 73) Los Angeles, United States
- Plays: Right-handed
- Prize money: $150,923

Singles
- Highest ranking: No. 88 (December 21, 1986)

Grand Slam singles results
- Australian Open: 3R (1987)
- French Open: 1R (1983, 1984, 1985, 1986, 1987)
- Wimbledon: 2R (1983, 1984)
- US Open: 2R (1986)

Doubles
- Highest ranking: No. 168 (December 21, 1986)

Tina Karwasky (born November 24, 1952) is a former professional tennis player from the United States.

Born Tina Watanabe, she is of Japanese descent. She competed during her career under her married name Tina Mochizuki.

== Biography ==
Karwasky, who grew up in Los Angeles, played collegiate tennis for California State University, Los Angeles (Cal State LA) in the 1970s.

As a professional player she had a best ranking of 88 in the world and appeared regularly in the main draws of all grand slam tournaments. Her match wins on the WTA Tour include Lisa Bonder, Dianne Fromholtz, Bonnie Gadusek and Kathy Rinaldi.

Later returning to Cal State LA, she was the school's tennis coach for 21 seasons.
