= Wendy Wood (tennis) =

American tennis player

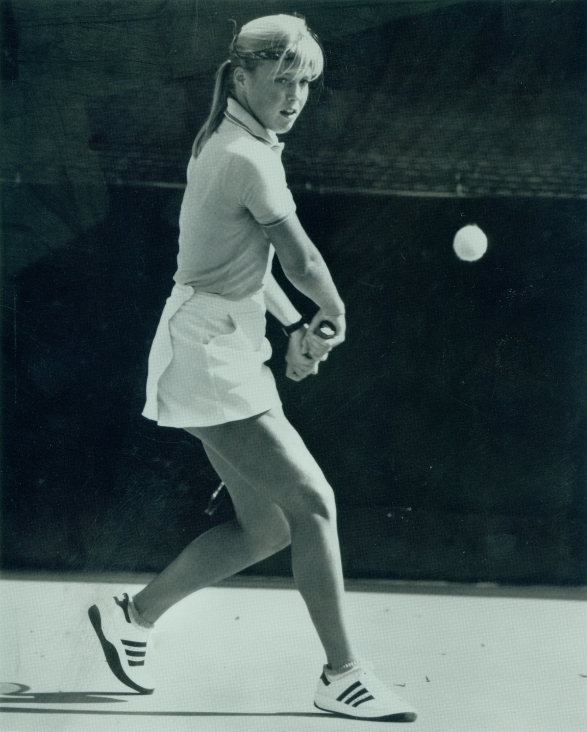
- Full name: Wendy Wood-Yang
- Country (sports): United States
- Born: April 20, 1964 (age 60)
- Prize money: $34,214

Singles
- Career record: 54–51
- Highest ranking: No. 185 (April 25, 1988)

Grand Slam singles results
- Australian Open: 2R (1988)

Doubles
- Career record: 34–36
- Highest ranking: No. 121 (February 15, 1988)

Grand Slam doubles results
- Australian Open: 3R (1988)
- French Open: 1R (1988)
- Wimbledon: 1R (1988)

Wendy Wood-Yang (born April 20, 1964) is a former professional tennis player from the United States.

== Biography ==
=== Tennis career ===
A graduate of Lexington High School in Massachusetts, Wood went on to attend Houston's Rice University on a scholarship. At Rice University, Wood twice earned All-American selection during her four years in collegiate tennis, finishing in 1986.

Wood played on the professional tour until 1988. As a qualifier, she featured in the main draw at the 1988 Australian Open and in the first round defeated 14th seed Dianne Balestrat, saving a match point along the way. The 1988 tournament saw the debut of the new venue of Melbourne Park and Wood's match against Balestrat was the first ever played on the center court, now known as Rod Laver Arena.

=== Personal life ===
Wood is the daughter of Major League Baseball pitcher Wilbur Wood, most known for his career at the Chicago White Sox.

Now working in the footwear industry, Wood is the President of Performance Lifestyle Group of Deckers Brands overseeing of HOKA ONE ONE, Sanuk and Teva. She married husband Jong Yang in 1990 and has three daughters.
