= Lindsay Bartlett =

American tennis player

- Full name: Lindsay Bartlett-Montero
- Country (sports): United States
- Born: July 31, 1962 (age 62)
- Prize money: $54,612

Singles
- Highest ranking: No. 175 (April 25, 1988)

Grand Slam singles results
- Australian Open: 2R (1988)

Doubles
- Highest ranking: No. 91 (January 30, 1989)

Grand Slam doubles results
- Australian Open: 1R (1988, 1989)
- US Open: 1R (1988)

Lindsay Bartlett-Montero (born July 31, 1962) is an American former professional tennis player.

== Biography ==
Bartlett, who grew up in California, played college tennis at the University of Oregon from 1981 to 1984 and amassed a 59-11 singles record.

As a professional player she reached a best singles ranking of 175 in the world. At the 1988 Australian Open she made the main draw as a qualifier and won through to the second round with a win over Kim Steinmetz. She was ranked as high as 91 in doubles, with her best performance on the WTA Tour a runner-up finish at the 1988 Cincinnati Open.

Her younger sister Shelly also played on the professional tour.

== WTA Tour finals ==
=== Doubles (0–1) ===
Result	Date	Tournament	Surface	Partner	Opponents	Score
Loss	7 August 1988	Cincinnati	Hard	(Canada) Helen Kelesi	(United States) Beth Herr (United States) Candy Reynolds	6–4, 6–7^{(9)}, 1–6
