= 1989 Australian Open – Men's singles qualifying =

Men's singles qualifying
- 1989 Australian Open

Events
Singles	men	women		boys	girls
Doubles	men	women	mixed	boys	girls
WC Singles	men	women	quad
WC Doubles	men	women	quad
Legends	men	women	mixed

Qualification
Singles	men	women
- Australian Open

This article displays the qualifying draw for men's singles at the 1989 Australian Open.

== Seeds ==
1. (United States) Jonathan Canter (second round)
2. (United Kingdom) Chris Bailey (qualifying competition, Lucky loser)
3. (Jamaica) Doug Burke (second round)
4. (New Zealand) David Lewis (qualifying competition)
5. (United States) John Ross (second round)
6. (West Germany) Frank Dennhardt (second round)
7. (United States) Tim Pawsat (qualifying competition)
8. (United States) Rick Leach (qualified)
9. (United States) Malcolm Allen (qualified)
10. (Argentina) Roberto Saad (second round)
11. (West Germany) Alexander Mronz (qualified)
12. (South Africa) Byron Talbot (qualified)
13. (United States) Kent Kinnear (qualified)
14. (United States) Steve DeVries (qualifying competition)
15. (South Africa) Stefan Kruger (second round)
16. (United States) Bret Garnett (qualified)
17. (United Kingdom) Danny Sapsford (qualifying competition)
18. (West Germany) Torben Theine (qualifying competition)
19. (Australia) Roger Rasheed (qualifying competition)
20. (United States) Tom Mercer (qualified)
21. (West Germany) Markus Zillner (second round)
22. (New Zealand) Bruce Derlin (qualifying competition)
23. (United States) Kelly Jones (second round)
24. (Socialist Federal Republic of Yugoslavia) Goran Ivanišević (qualified)
25. (Sweden) Magnus Larsson (qualified)
26. (United Kingdom) Mark Petchey (qualifying competition)
27. (Australia) Russell Barlow (second round)
28. (South Africa) Charles Honey (qualified)
29. (United States) Charles Merzbacher (qualified)
30. (France) Laurent Prades (qualified)
31. (West Germany) Martin Sinner (qualifying competition)
32. (South Korea) Kwon Yong-min (qualified)

== Qualifiers ==
1. (Austria) Oliver Fuchs
2. (South Korea) Kwon Yong-min
3. (United States) Charles Merzbacher
4. (France) Laurent Prades
5. (France) Guillaume Raoux
6. (South Africa) Charles Honey
7. (Sweden) Magnus Larsson
8. (United States) Rick Leach
9. (United States) Malcolm Allen
10. (Socialist Federal Republic of Yugoslavia) Goran Ivanišević
11. (West Germany) Alexander Mronz
12. (South Africa) Byron Talbot
13. (United States) Kent Kinnear
14. (United States) Tom Mercer
15. (United States) David Wheaton
16. (United States) Bret Garnett

== Lucky losers ==
1. (United Kingdom) Chris Bailey

== Qualifying draw ==
Key

- Q = Qualifier
- WC = Wild card
- LL = Lucky loser
- Alt = Alternate
- ITF = ITF entry
- PR = Protected ranking
- SR = Special ranking
- SE = Special exempt
- JE = Junior exempt
- JR = Junior Accelerator Programme entrant
- CO = College Accelerator Programme entrant
- NG = Next Gen Accelerator Program entrant
- w/o = Walkover
- r = Retired
- d = Defaulted

=== First qualifier ===
First round
(Austria) Oliver Fuchs	7^{7}	6
(Australia) Andrew Ritter	6^{4}	1
(Australia) Paul Hoysted	1	4
(West Germany) Stefan Heckmanns	6	6
(Australia) John Arbanas	6	2	1
31	(West Germany) Martin Sinner	3	6	6

Second round
1	(United States) Jonathan Canter	5	2
(Austria) Oliver Fuchs	7	6
(West Germany) Stefan Heckmanns	1	3
31	(West Germany) Martin Sinner	6	6

Qualifying competition
(Austria) Oliver Fuchs	7	7^{7}
31	(West Germany) Martin Sinner	5	6^{1}

=== Second qualifier ===
First round
WC	(Australia) Heath Denman	7^{9}	6^{5}	5
(Australia) Ashley Naumann	6^{7}	7^{7}	7
(Sweden) Johan Alvén	6	4	6
(Australia) Terry Deeth	1	6	3
WC	(Australia) Jarrod Broadbent	2	2
32	(South Korea) Kwon Yong-min	6	6

Second round
2	(United Kingdom) Chris Bailey	7	6
(Australia) Ashley Naumann	5	0
(Sweden) Johan Alvén	1	1
32	(South Korea) Kwon Yong-min	6	6

Qualifying competition
2	(United Kingdom) Chris Bailey	4	6	2
32	(South Korea) Kwon Yong-min	6	3	6

=== Third qualifier ===
First round
(Australia) Mike Baroch	3	2
WC	(Czechoslovakia) Martin Damm	6	6
(Australia) Paul Mick	3	6	3
(United States) Peter Wright	6	3	6
(Australia) Kurt Robinson	4	4
29	(United States) Charles Merzbacher	6	6

Second round
3	(Jamaica) Doug Burke	4^{r}
WC	(Czechoslovakia) Martin Damm	3
(United States) Peter Wright	3	1
29	(United States) Charles Merzbacher	6	6

Qualifying competition
WC	(Czechoslovakia) Martin Damm	4	4
29	(United States) Charles Merzbacher	6	6

=== Fourth qualifier ===
First round
(Australia) Des Tyson	4	5
(United States) Fred Viancos	6	7
(West Germany) Ivo Werner	3	6	6
(West Germany) Michael Feldbausch	6	4	3
(United States) Mark Buckley	4	2
30	(France) Laurent Prades	6	6

Second round
4	(New Zealand) David Lewis	6	6
(United States) Fred Viancos	3	4
(West Germany) Ivo Werner	4	5
30	(France) Laurent Prades	6	7

Qualifying competition
4	(New Zealand) David Lewis	3	1
30	(France) Laurent Prades	6	6

=== Fifth qualifier ===
First round
(France) Guillaume Raoux	6	6
WC	(Australia) Steven Foot	0	1
(Australia) Michael Brown	7	6
(United Kingdom) David Ireland	5	2
(Australia) Steve Furlong	0	7	4
27	(Australia) Russell Barlow	6	5	6

Second round
5	(United States) John Ross	3	2
(France) Guillaume Raoux	6	6
(Australia) Michael Brown	6	1	7
27	(Australia) Russell Barlow	3	6	5

Qualifying competition
(France) Guillaume Raoux	6	7^{7}
(Australia) Michael Brown	1	6^{4}

=== Sixth qualifier ===
First round
(Australia) Luke Leighton	6	6
WC	(Australia) Bret Richardson	2	3
(United States) Scott Brown	6^{1}	0
(West Germany) Sascha Petraschek	7^{7}	6
(United States) Mike Conroy	2	3
28	(South Africa) Charles Honey	6	6

Second round
6	(West Germany) Frank Dennhardt	6	4	6
(Australia) Luke Leighton	1	6	8
(West Germany) Sascha Petraschek	0	2
28	(South Africa) Charles Honey	6	6

Qualifying competition
(Australia) Luke Leighton	2	2
28	(South Africa) Charles Honey	6	6

=== Seventh qualifier ===
First round
(Australia) Gavin Pfitzner	6	6
(Australia) Andrew McLean	2	4
(Australia) David Macpherson	6	6
(Australia) Richard Fricker	4	4
(France) Serge Soulié	6^{3}	4
25	(Sweden) Magnus Larsson	7^{7}	6

Second round
7	(United States) Tim Pawsat	7^{7}	6
(Australia) Gavin Pfitzner	6^{4}	3
(Australia) David Macpherson	2	6^{6}
25	(Sweden) Magnus Larsson	6	7^{8}

Qualifying competition
7	(United States) Tim Pawsat	6^{4}	2
25	(Sweden) Magnus Larsson	7^{7}	6

=== Eighth qualifier ===
First round
(West Germany) Robert Kraus	5	1
(Austria) Thomas Buchmayer	7	6
(West Germany) Dirk Dier	6	6
(South Africa) David Adams	2	2
WC	(Australia) Grant Spierings	6	2	1
26	(United Kingdom) Mark Petchey	4	6	6

Second round
8	(United States) Rick Leach	6	6
(Austria) Thomas Buchmayer	4	4
(West Germany) Dirk Dier	4	2
26	(United Kingdom) Mark Petchey	6	6

Qualifying competition
8	(United States) Rick Leach	6	1	6
26	(United Kingdom) Mark Petchey	1	6	3

=== Ninth qualifier ===
First round
(Australia) Charlton Eagle	4	5
(Austria) Hans Priller	6	7
(Australia) Pavel Krta	1	2
WC	(Australia) Mark Hlawaty	6	6

Second round
9	(United States) Malcolm Allen	7	6^{5}	6
(Austria) Hans Priller	5	7^{7}	3
WC	(Australia) Mark Hlawaty	6	6
23	(United States) Kelly Jones	3	4

Qualifying competition
9	(United States) Malcolm Allen	6	6
WC	(Australia) Mark Hlawaty	0	3

=== Tenth qualifier ===
First round
(United States) Rill Baxter	6	6
(Australia) Richard Cahill	2	4
(Australia) Glen Eaton	6	4	9
(United States) Eric Riley	3	6	7
WC	(Australia) Glen Kellett	2	1
24	(Socialist Federal Republic of Yugoslavia) Goran Ivanišević	6	6

Second round
10	(Argentina) Roberto Saad	w/o
(United States) Rill Baxter
(Australia) Glen Eaton	1	3
24	(Socialist Federal Republic of Yugoslavia) Goran Ivanišević	6	6

Qualifying competition
(United States) Rill Baxter	3	3
24	(Socialist Federal Republic of Yugoslavia) Goran Ivanišević	6	6

=== Eleventh qualifier ===
First round
(Socialist Federal Republic of Yugoslavia) Igor Flego	6	6
(Australia) Dane Nebel	2	3
(Australia) Mark Draper	5	4
(West Germany) Harald Rittersbacher	7	6

Second round
11	(West Germany) Alexander Mronz	6	1	7
(Socialist Federal Republic of Yugoslavia) Igor Flego	2	6	5
(West Germany) Harald Rittersbacher	6	1	4
22	(New Zealand) Bruce Derlin	4	6	6

Qualifying competition
11	(West Germany) Alexander Mronz	3	6	6
22	(New Zealand) Bruce Derlin	6	4	4

=== Twelfth qualifier ===
First round
(United States) Jeff Klaparda	7^{7}	2	6
(United States) Charles Beckman	6^{5}	6	2
(Czechoslovakia) David Rikl	6	2	9
(United States) Gary Donnelly	3	6	7

Second round
12	(South Africa) Byron Talbot	6	6
(United States) Jeff Klaparda	2	4
(Czechoslovakia) David Rikl	6	6
21	(West Germany) Markus Zillner	4	4

Qualifying competition
12	(South Africa) Byron Talbot	6	6
(Czechoslovakia) David Rikl	1	4

=== Thirteenth qualifier ===
First round
(Australia) Andrew Florent	4	5
(Sweden) Magnus Tideman	6	7
(Philippines) Felix Barrientos	6	6
(Australia) Andrew Kratzmann	1	3

Second round
13	(United States) Kent Kinnear	6	4	7
(Sweden) Magnus Tideman	4	6	5
(Philippines) Felix Barrientos	6^{9}	6	4
19	(Australia) Roger Rasheed	7^{11}	4	6

Qualifying competition
13	(United States) Kent Kinnear	6	6
19	(Australia) Roger Rasheed	1	2

=== Fourteenth qualifier ===
First round
(Australia) Igor Jovanovic	7^{7}	6
WC	(Australia) Grant O'Callaghan	6^{3}	3
(Australia) Anthony Lane	6	6
(France) Raphaël Pedros	2	3

Second round
14	(United States) Steve DeVries	6	6
(Australia) Igor Jovanovic	3	3
(Australia) Anthony Lane	6^{6}	3
20	(United States) Tom Mercer	7^{8}	6

Qualifying competition
14	(United States) Steve DeVries	1	5
20	(United States) Tom Mercer	6	7

=== Fifteenth qualifier ===
First round
(Australia) Jason Cask	3	3
(United States) David Wheaton	6	6
(Philippines) Raymond Suarez	7^{7}	3	6
(Australia) Jon Ireland	6^{3}	6	4

Second round
15	(South Africa) Stefan Kruger	0	3
(United States) David Wheaton	6	6
(Philippines) Raymond Suarez	1	6^{3}
18	(West Germany) Torben Theine	6	7^{7}

Qualifying competition
(United States) David Wheaton	6	5	6
18	(West Germany) Torben Theine	2	7	3

=== Sixteenth qualifier ===
First round
(United States) Glenn Dickerson
(United States) Robbie Weiss	w/o
(Australia) Bryan Roe	7^{7}	6
(Australia) Peter Tramacchi	6^{2}	4

Second round
16	(United States) Bret Garnett	6	6
(United States) Glenn Dickerson	1	3
(Australia) Bryan Roe	6^{4}	7^{7}	3
17	(United Kingdom) Danny Sapsford	7^{7}	6^{2}	6

Qualifying competition
16	(United States) Bret Garnett	7^{9}	6
17	(United Kingdom) Danny Sapsford	6^{7}	4
