= 1989 Australian Open – Women's singles qualifying =

Women's singles qualifying
- 1989 Australian Open

Events
Singles	men	women		boys	girls
Doubles	men	women	mixed	boys	girls
WC Singles	men	women	quad
WC Doubles	men	women	quad
Legends	men	women	mixed

Qualification
Singles	men	women
- Australian Open

This article displays the qualifying draw for women's singles at the 1989 Australian Open.

== Seeds ==
1. -
2. (United States) Jeri Ingram (qualified)
3. (Japan) Yukie Koizumi (qualified)
4. (Japan) Nana Smith (qualifying competition)
5. (Luxembourg) Karin Kschwendt (qualified)
6. (United Kingdom) Julie Salmon (second round)
7. (Sweden) Maria Ekstrand (qualifying competition)
8. (Japan) Kumiko Okamoto (second round)
9. (Japan) Emiko Okagawa (second round)
10. (Canada) Patricia Hy-Boulais (qualifying competition)
11. (France) Catherine Bonnet (qualifying competition)
12. (United Kingdom) Amanda Grunfeld (second round)
13. (South Africa) Lise Gregory (second round)
14. (Netherlands) Hellas ter Riet (qualified)
15. (United States) Cynthia MacGregor (second round)
16. (Australia) Alison Scott (qualifying competition)
17. (France) Virginie Paquet (second round)

== Qualifiers ==
1. (United States) Andrea Farley
2. (Luxembourg) Karin Kschwendt
3. (Japan) Yukie Koizumi
4. (United States) Jennifer Fuchs
5. (United States) Kim Kessaris
6. (Netherlands) Hellas ter Riet
7. (Japan) Tamaka Takagi
8. (United States) Jeri Ingram

== Qualifying draw ==
Key

- Q = Qualifier
- WC = Wild card
- LL = Lucky loser
- Alt = Alternate
- ITF = ITF entry
- PR = Protected ranking
- SR = Special ranking
- SE = Special exempt
- JE = Junior exempt
- JR = Junior Accelerator Programme entrant
- CO = College Accelerator Programme entrant
- NG = Next Gen Accelerator Program entrant
- w/o = Walkover
- r = Retired
- d = Defaulted

=== First qualifier ===
First round
(Japan) Maya Kidowaki	6	6
(United Kingdom) Teresa Catlin	3	3
(United States) Lindsay Bartlett	1	2
(United States) Andrea Farley	6	6

Second round
17	(France) Virginie Paquet	3	2
(Japan) Maya Kidowaki	6	6
(United States) Andrea Farley	6	6
12	(United Kingdom) Amanda Grunfeld	0	1

Qualifying competition
(Japan) Maya Kidowaki	4	5
(United States) Andrea Farley	6	7

=== Second qualifier ===
First round
(United States) Jamie Golder	3	0
(New Zealand) Claudine Toleafoa	6	6
(Austria) Heidi Sprung	4	2
(United States) Elizabeth Galphin	6	6

Second round
10	(Canada) Patricia Hy-Boulais	6	6
(New Zealand) Claudine Toleafoa	4	2
(United States) Elizabeth Galphin	2	2
5	(Luxembourg) Karin Kschwendt	6	6

Qualifying competition
10	(Canada) Patricia Hy-Boulais	2	7^{7}	5
5	(Luxembourg) Karin Kschwendt	6	6^{0}	7

=== Third qualifier ===
First round
(Australia) Tracey Morton	6	7^{7}
(Australia) Kristine Kunce	2	6^{1}
WC	(Australia) Kelli-Ann Johnston	4	3
WC	(Australia) Lily Nejasmic	6	6

Second round
3	(Japan) Yukie Koizumi	6	6
(Australia) Tracey Morton	3	3
WC	(Australia) Lily Nejasmic	1	2
16	(Australia) Alison Scott	6	6

Qualifying competition
3	(Japan) Yukie Koizumi	6	4	6
16	(Australia) Alison Scott	3	6	0

=== Fourth qualifier ===
First round
(Australia) Clare Thompson	6	6
WC	(Australia) Kate McDonald	4	4
(United States) Jane Thomas	3	1
(United States) Jennifer Fuchs	6	6

Second round
13	(South Africa) Lise Gregory	6^{4}	2
(Australia) Clare Thompson	7^{7}	6
(United States) Jennifer Fuchs	7	6
8	(Japan) Kumiko Okamoto	5	3

Qualifying competition
(Australia) Clare Thompson	6^{2}	6	3
(United States) Jennifer Fuchs	7^{7}	2	6

=== Fifth qualifier ===
First round
Alt	(Australia) Amanda Tobin	6	6^{1}	2
(United States) Kim Kessaris	4	7^{7}	6
WC	(Australia) Maria Purcell	7^{10}	3	6
(United States) Sheri Norris	6^{8}	6	8

Second round
6	(United Kingdom) Julie Salmon	6	6^{3}	0
(United States) Kim Kessaris	3	7^{7}	6
(United States) Sheri Norris	6	6
9	(Japan) Emiko Okagawa	0	3

Qualifying competition
(United States) Kim Kessaris	6	6
(United States) Sheri Norris	3	4

=== Sixth qualifier ===
First round
(Netherlands) Marielle Rooimans	5	6	6
(United States) Molly Van Nostrand	7	3	4
(United States) Anna-Maria Fernandez	1	2
(United States) Jill Smoller	6	6

Second round
14	(Netherlands) Hellas ter Riet	6	6
(Netherlands) Marielle Rooimans	4	3
(United States) Jill Smoller	3	4
4	(Japan) Nana Smith	6	6

Qualifying competition
14	(Netherlands) Hellas ter Riet	7	2	6
4	(Japan) Nana Smith	5	6	4

=== Seventh qualifier ===
First round
WC	(Australia) Bilynda Potter	6	7
(Japan) Kazuko Ito	2	5
(United Kingdom) Anne Simpkin	6	2	3
(Japan) Tamaka Takagi	3	6	6

Second round
7	(Sweden) Maria Ekstrand	6	6
WC	(Australia) Bilynda Potter	4	3
(Japan) Tamaka Takagi	6	4	6
15	(United States) Cynthia MacGregor	2	6	1

Qualifying competition
7	(Sweden) Maria Ekstrand	2	1
(Japan) Tamaka Takagi	6	6

=== Eighth qualifier ===
First round
(Czechoslovakia) Andrea Strnadová	6	4	2
(Japan) Yasuyo Kajita	1	6	6
(Japan) Ei Iida	6	6^{5}	3
(New Zealand) Ruth Seeman	4	7^{7}	6

Second round
11	(France) Catherine Bonnet	6	7
(Japan) Yasuyo Kajita	3	5
(New Zealand) Ruth Seeman	7	1	2
2	(United States) Jeri Ingram	5	6	6

Qualifying competition
11	(France) Catherine Bonnet	5	0
2	(United States) Jeri Ingram	7	6
