= 1990 Australian Open – Men's singles qualifying =

Men's singles qualifying
- 1990 Australian Open

Events
Singles	men	women		boys	girls
Doubles	men	women	mixed	boys	girls
WC Singles	men	women	quad
WC Doubles	men	women	quad
Legends	men	women	mixed

Qualification
Singles	men	women
- Australian Open

This article displays the qualifying draw for men's singles at the 1990 Australian Open.

== Seeds ==
1. (Soviet Union) Andres Võsand (qualified)
2. (West Germany) Udo Riglewski (qualified)
3. (West Germany) Christian Saceanu (qualifying competition)
4. (United States) Joey Rive (second round)
5. (United States) Dan Cassidy (qualifying competition)
6. (Canada) Chris Pridham (qualified)
7. (Italy) Gianluca Pozzi (qualified)
8. (Canada) Glenn Michibata (second round)
9. (United States) Jeff Tarango (qualifying competition)
10. (Portugal) Nuno Marques (second round)
11. (Sweden) Magnus Larsson (qualified)
12. (West Germany) Alexander Mronz (qualifying competition)
13. (United Kingdom) Neil Broad (qualified)
14. (United Kingdom) Chris Bailey (second round)
15. (United Kingdom) Nick Brown (qualified)
16. (West Germany) Ricki Osterthun (second round)

== Qualifiers ==
1. (Soviet Union) Andres Võsand
2. (West Germany) Udo Riglewski
3. (Japan) Shuzo Matsuoka
4. (Czechoslovakia) Libor Němeček
5. (Czechoslovakia) Cyril Suk
6. (Canada) Chris Pridham
7. (Italy) Gianluca Pozzi
8. (Italy) Stefano Pescosolido
9. (Nigeria) Nduka Odizor
10. (West Germany) Pavel Vojtíšek
11. (Sweden) Magnus Larsson
12. (Australia) Peter Doohan
13. (United Kingdom) Neil Broad
14. (Australia) Michael Brown
15. (United Kingdom) Nick Brown
16. (France) Cédric Pioline

== Qualifying draw ==
Key

- Q = Qualifier
- WC = Wild card
- LL = Lucky loser
- Alt = Alternate
- ITF = ITF entry
- PR = Protected ranking
- SR = Special ranking
- SE = Special exempt
- JE = Junior exempt
- JR = Junior Accelerator Programme entrant
- CO = College Accelerator Programme entrant
- NG = Next Gen Accelerator Program entrant
- w/o = Walkover
- r = Retired
- d = Defaulted

=== First qualifier ===
First round
(Australia) Mark Draper	5
(Kenya) Paul Wekesa	3^{r}
(United States) Ted Scherman	2	4
(United States) Kenny Thorne	6	6
(United Kingdom) Mark Petchey	6	6
(United States) Scott Warner	2	3

Second round
1	(Soviet Union) Andres Võsand	6	6
(Australia) Mark Draper	2	3
(United States) Kenny Thorne	0	6	6
(United Kingdom) Mark Petchey	6	1	8

Qualifying competition
1	(Soviet Union) Andres Võsand	6	5	6
(United Kingdom) Mark Petchey	1	7	4

=== Second qualifier ===
First round
(West Germany) Frank Dennhardt	6	6
(Australia) Mahyar Goodarz	2	4
(Australia) William O'Neil	7	3	3
(Italy) Federico Mordegan	6	6	6
(Australia) Adam Anderson	3	1
(United Kingdom) Andrew Castle	6	6

Second round
2	(West Germany) Udo Riglewski	6	6
(West Germany) Frank Dennhardt	2	2
(Italy) Federico Mordegan	3	5
(United Kingdom) Andrew Castle	6	7

Qualifying competition
2	(West Germany) Udo Riglewski	6	6
(United Kingdom) Andrew Castle	4	3

=== Third qualifier ===
First round
(United States) James Schor	6	7
(West Germany) Matthias Mander	4	5
(Australia) Brett Custer	5	2
(Spain) Francisco Clavet	7	6
(Australia) Bret Richardson	2	5
(Japan) Shuzo Matsuoka	6	7

Second round
3	(West Germany) Christian Saceanu	6	6
(United States) James Schor	2	3
(Spain) Francisco Clavet	6	6	1
(Japan) Shuzo Matsuoka	7	3	6

Qualifying competition
3	(West Germany) Christian Saceanu	3	6	3
(Japan) Shuzo Matsuoka	6	2	6

=== Fourth qualifier ===
First round
(Czechoslovakia) Libor Němeček	6	3	6
(West Germany) Torben Theine	4	6	3
(United States) Shelby Cannon	3	5
(Australia) Andrew McLean	6	7
(Australia) Mark Hopkins	3	2
(West Germany) Sascha Nensel	6	6

Second round
4	(United States) Joey Rive	3	6	5
(Czechoslovakia) Libor Němeček	6	4	7
(Australia) Andrew McLean	4	0
(West Germany) Sascha Nensel	6	6

Qualifying competition
(Czechoslovakia) Libor Němeček	7	6
(West Germany) Sascha Nensel	5	4

=== Fifth qualifier ===
First round
(United Kingdom) James Turner	6	2
(Sweden) Johan Alvén	3	1^{r}
(Austria) Andreas Buchwald	1	3
(Italy) Cristiano Caratti	6	6
(Austria) Hans Priller	3	1
(Czechoslovakia) Cyril Suk	6	6

Second round
5	(United States) Dan Cassidy	7	7
(United Kingdom) James Turner	5	6
(Italy) Cristiano Caratti	6	4	1
(Czechoslovakia) Cyril Suk	3	6	6

Qualifying competition
5	(United States) Dan Cassidy	3	2
(Czechoslovakia) Cyril Suk	6	6

=== Sixth qualifier ===
First round
(Australia) Andrew Florent	3	7	6
(United Kingdom) David Ison	6	6	4
(Sweden) Roger Pettersson	1	1
(United States) Todd Nelson	6	6
(Canada) Daniel Nestor	6	5	2
(South Africa) Michael Robertson	1	7	6

Second round
6	(Canada) Chris Pridham	6	6
(Australia) Andrew Florent	3	4
(United States) Todd Nelson	4	6	2
(South Africa) Michael Robertson	6	4	6

Qualifying competition
6	(Canada) Chris Pridham	7	6
(South Africa) Michael Robertson	6	1

=== Seventh qualifier ===
First round
(West Germany) Andreas Maurer	6	7
(Netherlands) Joost Winnink	3	5
(United States) Scott Brown	1	1
(Australia) Pat Rafter	6	6
(Australia) Des Tyson	2	4
(South Africa) Mark Kaplan	6	6

Second round
7	(Italy) Gianluca Pozzi	6	7
(West Germany) Andreas Maurer	3	6
(Australia) Pat Rafter	6	0
(South Africa) Mark Kaplan	7	6

Qualifying competition
7	(Italy) Gianluca Pozzi	4	6	6
(South Africa) Mark Kaplan	6	4	3

=== Eighth qualifier ===
First round
(Australia) Grant Doyle	7	6
(West Germany) Sascha Petraschek	5	3
(West Germany) Stefan Heckmanns	6	3	2
(Australia) Wayne Davis	3	6	6
(Sweden) David Engel	6	4
(Italy) Stefano Pescosolido	7	6

Second round
8	(Canada) Glenn Michibata	3	2
(Australia) Grant Doyle	6	6
(Australia) Wayne Davis	2	2
(Italy) Stefano Pescosolido	6	6

Qualifying competition
(Australia) Grant Doyle	3	3
(Italy) Stefano Pescosolido	6	6

=== Ninth qualifier ===
First round
(United States) Richard Schmidt	4	7	8
(Australia) Laurie Warder	6	5	6
(Australia) Wayne Arthurs	3	1
(United States) Brian Page	6	6
(Australia) Brent Larkham	4	1
(Nigeria) Nduka Odizor	6	6

Second round
9	(United States) Jeff Tarango	6	3	6
(United States) Richard Schmidt	4	6	2
(United States) Brian Page	3	3
(Nigeria) Nduka Odizor	6	6

Qualifying competition
9	(United States) Jeff Tarango	5	4
(Nigeria) Nduka Odizor	7	6

=== Tenth qualifier ===
First round
(Sweden) Ronnie Båthman	7	3	6
(Australia) Dane Nebel	5	6	0
(Australia) Charlton Eagle	4	4
(Australia) Mark Hlawaty	6	6
(Australia) Matthew MacMahon	2	2
(West Germany) Pavel Vojtíšek	6	6

Second round
10	(Portugal) Nuno Marques	5	3
(Sweden) Ronnie Båthman	7	6
(Australia) Mark Hlawaty	2	1
(West Germany) Pavel Vojtíšek	6	6

Qualifying competition
(Sweden) Ronnie Båthman	4	1
(West Germany) Pavel Vojtíšek	6	6

=== Eleventh qualifier ===
First round
(Australia) David Culley	6	6
(Australia) Peter Carter	1	3
(Australia) Andrew Kratzmann	6	1
(United States) Mark Keil	7	6
(Socialist Federal Republic of Yugoslavia) Saša Hiršzon	1	2^{r}
(Spain) Sergio Casal	6	2

Second round
11	(Sweden) Magnus Larsson	6	6
(Australia) David Culley	3	0
(United States) Mark Keil	7	4	6
(Spain) Sergio Casal	6	6	3

Qualifying competition
11	(Sweden) Magnus Larsson	6	6
(United States) Mark Keil	3	0

=== Twelfth qualifier ===
First round
(Venezuela) Alfonso Gonzalez-Mora	6	1	6
(Australia) Gavin Pfitzner	0	6	4
(Australia) Sean Karam	5	2
(Socialist Federal Republic of Yugoslavia) Srđan Muškatirović	7	6
(South Africa) David Adams	1	2
(Australia) Peter Doohan	6	6

Second round
12	(West Germany) Alexander Mronz	7	1	6
(Venezuela) Alfonso Gonzalez-Mora	5	6	3
(Socialist Federal Republic of Yugoslavia) Srđan Muškatirović	3	4
(Australia) Peter Doohan	6	6

Qualifying competition
12	(West Germany) Alexander Mronz	5	4
(Australia) Peter Doohan	7	6

=== Thirteenth qualifier ===
First round
13	(United Kingdom) Neil Broad	6	6
(Australia) Adrian Targett	4	4
(Malaysia) Adam Malik	6	6
(Australia) Mike Lynch	2	4
(United States) Kent Kinnear	2	4
(Italy) Renzo Furlan	6	6
(Australia) Sandon Stolle	6	6
(West Germany) Peter Ballauff	4	3

Second round
13	(United Kingdom) Neil Broad	6	3	8
(Malaysia) Adam Malik	3	6	6
(Italy) Renzo Furlan	6	3
(Australia) Sandon Stolle	7	6

Qualifying competition
13	(United Kingdom) Neil Broad	7	6
(Australia) Sandon Stolle	5	2

=== Fourteenth qualifier ===
First round
14	(United Kingdom) Chris Bailey	6	5	6
(Australia) Roger Rasheed	1	7	4
(Australia) Michael Brown	7	3	8
(Australia) Jason Cask	5	6	6
(Australia) John Marinov	2	1
(Sweden) Per Henricsson	6	6
(Australia) Mark Jeffrey	5	2
(Sweden) Nicklas Utgren	7	6

Second round
14	(United Kingdom) Chris Bailey	0	6	1
(Australia) Michael Brown	6	4	6
(Sweden) Per Henricsson	6	2
(Sweden) Nicklas Utgren	7	6

Qualifying competition
(Australia) Michael Brown	4	6	6
(Sweden) Nicklas Utgren	6	3	4

=== Fifteenth qualifier ===
First round
15	(United Kingdom) Nick Brown	6	6
(Sweden) Ville Jansson	4	4
(Italy) Paolo Pambianco	6	6
(Canada) Robert Janecek	1	1
(Belgium) Xavier Daufresne	4	4
(United States) John Ross	6	6
(Australia) Joshua Eagle	2	2
(The Bahamas) Roger Smith	6	6

Second round
15	(United Kingdom) Nick Brown	3	6	6
(Italy) Paolo Pambianco	6	3	4
(United States) John Ross	6	6
(The Bahamas) Roger Smith	3	4

Qualifying competition
15	(United Kingdom) Nick Brown	6	6
(United States) John Ross	3	3

=== Sixteenth qualifier ===
First round
16	(West Germany) Ricki Osterthun	6	6
(Australia) Paul Kilderry	4	3
(France) Cédric Pioline	6	6
(United States) Rick Leach	3	4
(United States) Tim Pawsat	7	2	1
(United States) Malcolm Allen	5	6	6
(Australia) Jon Ireland	2	2
(West Germany) Patrick Baur	6	6

Second round
16	(West Germany) Ricki Osterthun	6	4	4
(France) Cédric Pioline	4	6	6
(United States) Malcolm Allen	2	5
(West Germany) Patrick Baur	6	7

Qualifying competition
(France) Cédric Pioline	6	3	7
(West Germany) Patrick Baur	1	6	5
