= 1992 Australian Open – Men's singles qualifying =

Men's singles qualifying
- 1992 Australian Open

Events
Singles	men	women		boys	girls
Doubles	men	women	mixed	boys	girls
WC Singles	men	women	quad
WC Doubles	men	women	quad
Legends	men	women	mixed

Qualification
Singles	men	women
- Australian Open

This article displays the qualifying draw for men's singles at the 1992 Australian Open.

== Seeds ==
1. (Commonwealth of Independent States) Andrei Olhovskiy (first round)
2. (Canada) Chris Pridham (second round)
3. (Mexico) Leonardo Lavalle (qualified)
4. (United States) Glenn Layendecker (qualified)
5. (Sweden) Peter Lundgren (qualifying competition, lucky loser)
6. (Australia) Simon Youl (qualified)
7. (Australia) Johan Anderson (second round)
8. (United States) Francisco Montana (qualifying competition)
9. (Sweden) David Engel (second round)
10. (Canada) Martin Laurendeau (qualifying competition)
11. (Socialist Federal Republic of Yugoslavia) Slobodan Živojinović (second round)
12. (United States) David Pate (qualified)
13. (Czechoslovakia) Tomáš Anzari (qualifying competition)
14. (Germany) Arne Thoms (second round)
15. (United Kingdom) Jeremy Bates (qualified)
16. (South Africa) Grant Stafford (qualified)
17. (Australia) Neil Borwick (qualifying competition)
18. (Czechoslovakia) Libor Němeček (second round)
19. (Germany) Udo Riglewski (first round)
20. (Sweden) Thomas Enqvist (qualified)
21. (Belgium) Xavier Daufresne (first round)
22. (Sweden) Johan Carlsson (first round)
23. (United States) Mark Keil (first round)
24. (Australia) Carl Limberger (qualified)
25. (Sweden) Niclas Kroon (qualified)
26. (Australia) Mark Kratzmann (second round)
27. (Finland) Aki Rahunen (qualified)
28. (United States) Jonathan Stark (second round)
29. (Austria) Thomas Buchmayer (qualifying competition)
30. (Canada) Andrew Sznajder (first round)
31. (United States) Kent Kinnear (qualifying competition)
32. (Canada) Daniel Nestor (qualified)

== Qualifiers ==
1. (Canada) Daniel Nestor
2. (Sweden) Lars-Anders Wahlgren
3. (Mexico) Leonardo Lavalle
4. (United States) Glenn Layendecker
5. (Finland) Aki Rahunen
6. (Australia) Simon Youl
7. (United States) Jared Palmer
8. (Sweden) Niclas Kroon
9. (Australia) Carl Limberger
10. (United States) Bret Garnett
11. (Australia) Pat Rafter
12. (United States) David Pate
13. (Sweden) Thomas Enqvist
14. (Australia) Broderick Dyke
15. (United Kingdom) Jeremy Bates
16. (South Africa) Grant Stafford

== Lucky losers ==
1. (Sweden) Peter Lundgren

== Qualifying draw ==
Key

- Q = Qualifier
- WC = Wild card
- LL = Lucky loser
- Alt = Alternate
- ITF = ITF entry
- PR = Protected ranking
- SR = Special ranking
- SE = Special exempt
- JE = Junior exempt
- JR = Junior Accelerator Programme entrant
- CO = College Accelerator Programme entrant
- NG = Next Gen Accelerator Program entrant
- w/o = Walkover
- r = Retired
- d = Defaulted

=== First qualifier ===
First round
1	(Commonwealth of Independent States) Andrei Olhovskiy	7	4	4
(Australia) Andrew Kratzmann	6	6	6
(United States) Robbie Weiss	6	6
(Czechoslovakia) Daniel Vacek	4	2
(United States) Ted Scherman	7	2	6
(South Africa) David Adams	6	6	3
(Brazil) Mauro Menezes	3	4
32	(Canada) Daniel Nestor	6	6

Second round
(Australia) Andrew Kratzmann	3	2
(United States) Robbie Weiss	6	6
(United States) Ted Scherman	3	2
32	(Canada) Daniel Nestor	6	6

Qualifying competition
(United States) Robbie Weiss	7	5	4
32	(Canada) Daniel Nestor	6	7	6

=== Second qualifier ===
First round
2	(Canada) Chris Pridham	6	6
WC	(Australia) Scott Draper	3	2
(Australia) Mark Draper	7	2	2
(Sweden) Lars-Anders Wahlgren	6	6	6
(Italy) Laurence Tieleman	4	3
(Kenya) Paul Wekesa	6	6
(Australia) Joshua Eagle	6	1	3
31	(United States) Kent Kinnear	4	6	6

Second round
2	(Canada) Chris Pridham	6	6	3
(Sweden) Lars-Anders Wahlgren	4	7	6
(Kenya) Paul Wekesa	5	6	3
31	(United States) Kent Kinnear	7	3	6

Qualifying competition
(Sweden) Lars-Anders Wahlgren	6	6
31	(United States) Kent Kinnear	1	1

=== Third qualifier ===
First round
3	(Mexico) Leonardo Lavalle	6	7
(Germany) Stefan Heckmanns	1	5
(Philippines) Roland So	2	7	0
(Australia) Brent Larkham	6	5	6
(Australia) Todd Larkham	3	4
(Australia) Jon Ireland	6	6
(The Bahamas) Roger Smith	6	4	6
30	(Canada) Andrew Sznajder	3	6	3

Second round
3	(Mexico) Leonardo Lavalle	7	6
(Australia) Brent Larkham	6	2
(Australia) Jon Ireland	1	3
(The Bahamas) Roger Smith	6	6

Qualifying competition
3	(Mexico) Leonardo Lavalle	6	6
(The Bahamas) Roger Smith	4	2

=== Fourth qualifier ===
First round
4	(United States) Glenn Layendecker	7	7
(United States) T. J. Middleton	6	5
(Australia) John Frawley	6	3	6
(South Africa) Pieter Aldrich	2	6	1
(United States) Murphy Jensen	6	4	6
(United States) Michael Joyce	4	6	2
WC	(Australia) Anastasios Vasiliadis	1	2
29	(Austria) Thomas Buchmayer	6	6

Second round
4	(United States) Glenn Layendecker	4	6	6
(Australia) John Frawley	6	4	3
(United States) Murphy Jensen	2	1
29	(Austria) Thomas Buchmayer	6	6

Qualifying competition
4	(United States) Glenn Layendecker	6	7
29	(Austria) Thomas Buchmayer	0	5

=== Fifth qualifier ===
First round
5	(Sweden) Peter Lundgren	6	6
(Japan) Yasushi Morishita	3	2
(United States) Steve DeVries	6	6
(United States) Scott Patridge	3	3
(Australia) James Holmes	7	7
(Australia) Charlton Eagle	6	5
(United States) Luke Jensen	3	6	1
27	(Finland) Aki Rahunen	6	2	6

Second round
5	(Sweden) Peter Lundgren	6	6	6
(United States) Steve DeVries	3	7	1
(Australia) James Holmes	1	2
27	(Finland) Aki Rahunen	6	6

Qualifying competition
5	(Sweden) Peter Lundgren	3	1
27	(Finland) Aki Rahunen	6	6

=== Sixth qualifier ===
First round
6	(Australia) Simon Youl	6	6
(United States) John Sobel	1	3
(United States) Michael Herb	3	6	3
(Australia) Michael Brown	6	3	6
(Australia) Matthew MacMahon	6	2
(United States) Rick Leach	7	6
(United States) Phil Williamson	1	1
28	(United States) Jonathan Stark	6	6

Second round
6	(Australia) Simon Youl	3	7	6
(Australia) Michael Brown	6	6	3
(United States) Rick Leach	7	6
28	(United States) Jonathan Stark	6	4

Qualifying competition
6	(Australia) Simon Youl	3	7	8
(United States) Rick Leach	6	5	6

=== Seventh qualifier ===
First round
7	(Australia) Johan Anderson	7	6
(Australia) Darren Patten	5	3
(Ivory Coast) Clément N’Goran	7	6	6
WC	(Australia) Steven Baldas	6	7	1
(Australia) Bret Richardson	2	2
(United States) Jared Palmer	6	6
(Republic of Ireland) Derek Farren	5	7	2
26	(Australia) Mark Kratzmann	7	6	6

Second round
7	(Australia) Johan Anderson	4	4
(Ivory Coast) Clément N’Goran	6	6
(United States) Jared Palmer	6	3	14
26	(Australia) Mark Kratzmann	4	6	12

Qualifying competition
(Ivory Coast) Clément N’Goran	1	3
(United States) Jared Palmer	6	6

=== Eighth qualifier ===
First round
8	(United States) Francisco Montana	6	6
(Czechoslovakia) Jan Havel	3	3
(Australia) David Macpherson	2	7	6
(South Africa) Danie Visser	6	6	8
(United States) Brian Garrow	7	6
(New Zealand) Bruce Derlin	6	2
(Argentina) Pablo Albano	1	6	6
25	(Sweden) Niclas Kroon	6	3	8

Second round
8	(United States) Francisco Montana	7	6
(South Africa) Danie Visser	6	2
(United States) Brian Garrow	2	3
25	(Sweden) Niclas Kroon	6	6

Qualifying competition
8	(United States) Francisco Montana	5	3
25	(Sweden) Niclas Kroon	7	6

=== Ninth qualifier ===
First round
9	(Sweden) David Engel	7	6
(United States) Brad Pearce	5	2
WC	(Australia) Leigh Holland	3	6	2
(South Africa) Piet Norval	6	3	6
(South Africa) Mark Kaplan	7	6
(Australia) Mark Hopkins	5	2
(Japan) Hitoshi Shirato	1	0
24	(Australia) Carl Limberger	6	6

Second round
9	(Sweden) David Engel	6	3	4
(South Africa) Piet Norval	4	6	6
(South Africa) Mark Kaplan	6	4
24	(Australia) Carl Limberger	7	6

Qualifying competition
(South Africa) Piet Norval	7	6	5
24	(Australia) Carl Limberger	6	7	7

=== Tenth qualifier ===
First round
10	(Canada) Martin Laurendeau	6	6
(Australia) Peter Tramacchi	4	1
(Australia) Andrew Florent	5	6	6
(Australia) Stephen Gleeson	7	4	4
(United States) Todd Nelson	6	6
(Australia) Patrick Flynn	3	3
(United States) Bret Garnett	6	7
23	(United States) Mark Keil	4	6

Second round
10	(Canada) Martin Laurendeau	6	6	6
(Australia) Andrew Florent	7	4	4
(United States) Todd Nelson	3	4
(United States) Bret Garnett	6	6

Qualifying competition
10	(Canada) Martin Laurendeau	2	6	5
(United States) Bret Garnett	6	4	7

=== Eleventh qualifier ===
First round
11	(Socialist Federal Republic of Yugoslavia) Slobodan Živojinović	6	6
(Australia) John Arbanas	2	2
(Netherlands) Tom Kempers	1	3
(Australia) Pat Rafter	6	6
WC	(Australia) Mahyar Goodarz	3	6	6
WC	(Australia) Alistair MacDonald	6	2	4
(United States) Brian Dunn	6	6
22	(Sweden) Johan Carlsson	4	4

Second round
11	(Socialist Federal Republic of Yugoslavia) Slobodan Živojinović	6	6
(Australia) Pat Rafter	7	7
WC	(Australia) Mahyar Goodarz	7	7
(United States) Brian Dunn	6	6

Qualifying competition
(Australia) Pat Rafter	6	7
WC	(Australia) Mahyar Goodarz	2	5

=== Twelfth qualifier ===
First round
12	(United States) David Pate	6	7
(United States) Scott Melville	3	6
(Czechoslovakia) Libor Pimek	1	3
(United States) Kenny Thorne	6	6
(Australia) Ian Peter-Budge	6	6
WC	(Australia) Justin Broughton	2	4
(United States) Shelby Cannon	6	6
21	(Belgium) Xavier Daufresne	4	4

Second round
12	(United States) David Pate	6	6
(United States) Kenny Thorne	2	3
(Australia) Ian Peter-Budge	6	7
(United States) Shelby Cannon	3	6

Qualifying competition
12	(United States) David Pate	6	6
(Australia) Ian Peter-Budge	4	0

=== Thirteenth qualifier ===
First round
13	(Czechoslovakia) Tomáš Anzari	6	6
(India) Mahesh Bhupathi	3	2
(United States) Sylvano Simone	2	3
(Czechoslovakia) Vojtěch Flégl	6	6
(Socialist Federal Republic of Yugoslavia) Iztok Božič	1	6	5
(Germany) Axel Finnberg	6	4	7
WC	(Australia) Bradley Sceney	4	1
20	(Sweden) Thomas Enqvist	6	6

Second round
13	(Czechoslovakia) Tomáš Anzari	7	4	8
(Czechoslovakia) Vojtěch Flégl	5	6	6
(Germany) Axel Finnberg	4	2
20	(Sweden) Thomas Enqvist	6	6

Qualifying competition
13	(Czechoslovakia) Tomáš Anzari	1	1
20	(Sweden) Thomas Enqvist	6	6

=== Fourteenth qualifier ===
First round
14	(Germany) Arne Thoms	7	7
(Australia) Wayne Arthurs	6	6
(United States) Kenneth Lee	1	1
(United States) Paul Annacone	6	6
(Australia) Broderick Dyke	6	6
(Australia) Heath Denman	1	1
(Australia) Andrew McLean	6	5	6
19	(Germany) Udo Riglewski	4	7	1

Second round
14	(Germany) Arne Thoms	5	2
(United States) Paul Annacone	7	6
(Australia) Broderick Dyke	7	3	6
(Australia) Andrew McLean	5	6	3

Qualifying competition
(United States) Paul Annacone	2	2
(Australia) Broderick Dyke	6	6

=== Fifteenth qualifier ===
First round
15	(United Kingdom) Jeremy Bates	6	6
(Australia) Dean Danzi	2	2
(South Africa) Dick Bosse	6	6
(Australia) Gavin Pfitzner	1	4
(United States) Alex Nizet	4	3
(South Africa) Byron Talbot	6	6
(United States) John Sullivan	4	2
18	(Czechoslovakia) Libor Němeček	6	6

Second round
15	(United Kingdom) Jeremy Bates	4	6	6
(South Africa) Dick Bosse	6	4	2
(South Africa) Byron Talbot	3	7	6
18	(Czechoslovakia) Libor Němeček	6	6	3

Qualifying competition
15	(United Kingdom) Jeremy Bates	6	7
(South Africa) Byron Talbot	2	5

=== Sixteenth qualifier ===
First round
16	(South Africa) Grant Stafford	6	6
(Netherlands) Menno Oosting	1	4
(United States) Greg Failla	6	6
(Brazil) Ricardo Acioly	0	0
(France) François Errard	6	0	0
WC	(Australia) Chris Mahony	2	6	6
(Australia) Aaron Senes	2	4
17	(Australia) Neil Borwick	6	6

Second round
16	(South Africa) Grant Stafford	6	6	6
(United States) Greg Failla	7	1	2
WC	(Australia) Chris Mahony	4	0
17	(Australia) Neil Borwick	6	6

Qualifying competition
16	(South Africa) Grant Stafford	6	6
17	(Australia) Neil Borwick	1	4
