= Andreas Buchwald =

Austrian tennis player

- Country (sports): Austria
- Born: 2 February 1969 (age 56)

Singles
- Highest ranking: No. 490 (27 Aug 1990)

Grand Slam singles results
- Australian Open: Q1 (1990)

Doubles
- Career record: 0–1
- Highest ranking: No. 600 (14 Sep 1987)

Andreas Buchwald (born 2 February 1969) is an Austrian former professional tennis player.

Buchwald made a Grand Prix (ATP Tour) main draw appearance in doubles at the Austrian Open Kitzbühel in 1989, partnering with Stefan Lochbihler. He reached a best singles world ranking of 490 and featured in the qualifying draw of the 1990 Australian Open, where he was eliminated by Cristiano Caratti.
