= Kim Kessaris =

American tennis player

- Full name: Kimberly Lynn Kessaris
- Country (sports): United States
- Born: March 27, 1973 (age 52)
- Prize money: $41,101

Singles
- Highest ranking: No. 124 (July 17, 1989)

Grand Slam singles results
- Australian Open: 3R (1989)
- Wimbledon: 2R (1989)
- US Open: 1R (1989)

Doubles
- Highest ranking: No. 381 (October 24, 1988)

Kimberly Lynn Kessaris (born March 27, 1973) is a former professional tennis player from the United States.

== Biography ==
=== Early life ===
Kessaris grew up in Hendersonville, North Carolina, the daughter of Jim and Peggy. Her father, a dentist by profession, got her started in tennis when she was five. She attended the local Heritage Hall school.

Considered a tennis prodigy, she was a top ranked junior and trained at Nick Bollettieri's Tennis Academy in Florida.

=== Tennis career ===
Kessaris made her WTA Tour debut at Charleston in 1987, just days after her 14th birthday.

In 1988 she was beaten by Steffi Graf in only 32-minutes at a tournament in Mahwah.

At the 1989 Australian Open she defeated Andrea Farley in the girls' singles final to become the first American to win an Australian Open junior title. She also qualified for the main draw of the women's singles and made the third round.

Her best performance on the WTA Tour was a quarter-final appearance at the 1989 Virginia Slims of Houston as a lucky loser and that July she reached her highest ranking of 124 in the world.

Following the 1990 Australian Open she left professional tennis, aged 16.
