= Douglas Geiwald =

Swedish tennis player

- Country (sports): Sweden
- Born: 14 April 1971 (age 54) Olofström, Sweden
- Prize money: $10,245

Singles
- Highest ranking: No. 362 (26 Aug 1991)

Doubles
- Career record: 0–1
- Highest ranking: No. 242 (12 Oct 1992)

Douglas Geiwald (born 14 April 1971) is a Swedish former professional tennis player.

== Tennis career ==
As a junior, Geiwald participated in the singles at the junior French Open and US Open in 1989 and with Mårten Renström in the doubles at the 1989 junior US Open. He finished 1989 as the No. 16 in singles and the No. 4 in doubles on the Junior World rankings.

On the professional tour, Geiwald had best world rankings of 362 in singles and 242 in doubles. His only appearance in the main draw of an ATP event was at the 1990 Swedish Open, where he and partner Roger Pettersson lost in the first round of the doubles to their compatriots, Rikard Bergh and Ronnie Båthman. He reached one singles final and one doubles final on the ATP Challenger Tour.

In 1999, Geiwald served as the head coach of the UNLV Rebels women's tennis program.

== ATP Challenger finals ==
=== Singles: 1 (0–1) ===
Result	No.	Date	Tournament	Surface	Opponent	Score
Loss	1.	Aug 1991	Jakarta, Indonesia	Hard	(Italy) Mario Visconti	3–6, 6–1, 2–6

=== Doubles: 1 (0–1) ===
Result	No.	Date	Tournament	Surface	Partner	Opponents	Score
Loss	1.	Oct 1992	Dublin, Ireland	Hard	(South Africa) Robbie Koenig	(Netherlands) Sander Groen (Germany) Arne Thoms	7–5, 4–6, 3–6
