= Ian Peter-Budge =

Australian tennis player

- Full name: Ian Peter-Budge
- Country (sports): Australia
- Born: 26 June 1968 (age 56); Melbourne, Australia

Singles
- Career record: 0–2
- Highest ranking: No. 405 (12 November 1990)

Grand Slam singles results
- Australian Open: 1R (1989, 1990)

Ian Peter-Budge (born 26 June 1968) is a former professional tennis player from Australia.

== Biography ==
Peter-Budge, a player from Melbourne, was coached by Warren Maher.

During his career he made two main draw appearances at the Australian Open, both as a wildcard. At the 1989 Australian Open he lost to Anders Järryd in the first round and at the 1990 Australian Open he was beaten again in the opening round, by Nduka Odizor.

He now works as a tennis coach in Melbourne's eastern suburbs.
