= Roger Pettersson (tennis) =

Swedish tennis player

- Country (sports): Sweden
- Residence: Henderson, Nevada, United States
- Born: 5 April 1972 (age 52)
- College: University of Nevada, Las Vegas
- Prize money: $1,135

Singles
- Highest ranking: No. 485 (14 May 1990)

Grand Slam singles results
- Australian Open: Q1 (1990)

Doubles
- Career record: 0–1
- Career titles: 0
- Highest ranking: No. 550 (11 May 1992)

Roger Pettersson (born 5 April 1972) is a former Swedish tennis player.

== Biography ==
Pettersson, in partnership with fellow Swede Mårten Renström, won the Boys' Doubles title at the 1990 Australian Open.

His only appearance in the main draw of an ATP event was at the 1990 Swedish Open, where he and partner Douglas Geiwald lost in the first round of the doubles to their compatriots, Rikard Bergh and Ronnie Båthman.

Pettersson attended college in the United States and played collegiate tennis with the UNLV Rebels and earned All-American honours in 1994 in singles and in 1996, for both singles and doubles. He graduated in 1996 with a bachelor’s degree in hotel administration after which the retired from competitive tennis. Pettersson was inducted into the UNLV Athletics Hall of Fame in 2006.

== Junior Grand Slam titles ==
=== Doubles: 1 ===
Result	Year	Championship	Surface	Partner	Opponents	Score
Win	1990	Australian Open	Hard	(Sweden) Mårten Renström	(Canada) Robert Janecek (Mexico) Ernesto Munoz de Cote	4–6, 7–6, 6–1
