= 1990 Swedish Open – Men's doubles =

Men's doubles
- 1990 Swedish Open

Final
- Champions: (Sweden) R Båthman (Sweden) R Bergh
- Runners-up: (Sweden) Jan Gunnarsson (West Germany) Udo Riglewski
- Score: 6–1, 6–4

Details
- Draw: 16
- Seeds: 2

Events
Singles	men	women
Doubles	men	women
- Swedish Open

Per Henricsson and Nicklas Utgren were the defending champions, but lost in the semifinals.

Ronnie Båthman and Rikard Bergh won the title, defeating Jan Gunnarsson and Udo Riglewski 6–1, 6–4 in the final.

== Seeds ==
Champion seeds are indicated in bold text while text in italics indicates the round in which those seeds were eliminated.

1. (Sweden) Jan Gunnarsson / (West Germany) Udo Riglewski (final)
2. (Sweden) Per Henricsson / (Sweden) Nicklas Utgren (semifinals)

== Draw ==
Key

- Q = Qualifier
- WC = Wild card
- LL = Lucky loser
- Alt = Alternate
- ITF = ITF entry
- PR = Protected ranking
- SR = Special ranking
- SE = Special exempt
- JE = Junior exempt
- JR = Junior Accelerator Programme entrant
- CO = College Accelerator Programme entrant
- NG = Next Gen Accelerator Program entrant
- w/o = Walkover
- r = Retired
- d = Defaulted

First round
1	(Sweden) **J Gunnarsson** **(West Germany) U Riglewski**	**6**	**6**
(Sweden) L Wahlgren (Sweden) D Engel	2	2
Q	(Sweden) J Carlsson (Sweden) M Tideman	0	3
(Socialist Federal Republic of Yugoslavia) **G Prpić** **(Socialist Federal Republic of Yugoslavia) B Orešar**	**6**	**6**
(Argentina) **G Pérez Roldán** **(Czechoslovakia) M Vajda**	3	**6**	**7**
(Venezuela) A Mora (Sweden) T Svantesson	**6**	3	6
(Sweden) T Nydahl (Sweden) P Svensson	0	**6**	4
(Sweden) **N Kulti** **(Sweden) M Larsson**	**6**	4	**6**
(Sweden) **N Kroon** **(Sweden) M Wilander**	**6**	**6**	**7**
(Australia) J Anderson (Australia) R Fromberg	**7**	4	5
(Sweden) **R Båthman** **(Sweden) R Bergh**	**6**	**6**
(Sweden) D Geiwald (Sweden) R Pettersson	3	1
(Sweden) C Allgardh (Sweden) N Holm	4	6
(Sweden) **O Jonsson** **(Sweden) F Nilsson**	**6**	**7**
(Sweden) J Apell (Sweden) O Kristiansson	5	4	**6**
2	(Sweden) **P Henricsson** **(Sweden) N Utgren**	**7**	**6**	4

Quarterfinals
1	(Sweden) **J Gunnarsson** **(West Germany) U Riglewski**	**6**	**6**
(Socialist Federal Republic of Yugoslavia) G Prpić (Socialist Federal Republic of Yugoslavia) B Orešar	3	3
(Argentina) **G Pérez Roldán** **(Czechoslovakia) M Vajda**	**7**	3	**6**
(Sweden) N Kulti (Sweden) M Larsson	6	**6**	3
(Sweden) N Kroon (Sweden) M Wilander	**6**	3	2
(Sweden) **R Båthman** **(Sweden) R Bergh**	3	**6**	**6**
(Sweden) O Jonsson (Sweden) F Nilsson	**6**	3	3
2	(Sweden) **P Henricsson** **(Sweden) N Utgren**	4	**6**	**6**

Semifinals
1	(Sweden) **J Gunnarsson** **(West Germany) U Riglewski**	**7**	**6**
(Argentina) G Pérez Roldán (Czechoslovakia) M Vajda	5	4
(Sweden) **R Båthman** **(Sweden) R Bergh**	**7**	6	**6**
2	(Sweden) P Henricsson (Sweden) N Utgren	6	**7**	2

Final
1	(Sweden) J Gunnarsson (West Germany) U Riglewski	1	4
(Sweden) **R Båthman** **(Sweden) R Bergh**	**6**	**6**
