= Fred Viancos =

American tennis player

- Country (sports): United States
- Born: July 16, 1962 (age 63) Santiago, Chile
- Height: 6 ft 1 in (185 cm)

Singles
- Highest ranking: No. 659 (June 13, 1988)

Grand Slam singles results
- Australian Open: Q2 (1989)

Doubles
- Career record: 4–6
- Highest ranking: No. 252 (May 15, 1989)

Grand Slam doubles results
- Australian Open: 1R (1989)

Fred Viancos (born July 16, 1962) is an American former professional tennis player.

Viancos, born in Chile, was a collegiate tennis player for Texas Christian University. He turned professional after college in 1985 and was an early doubles partner of Jim Courier. In 1989 he featured in the men's doubles main draw of the Australian Open. He served as the Chief Operating Officer the last seven of his 24 years at the United States Professional Tennis Association. Since May 2023, He is the Executive Director of the USTA Texas Section.
