= Sascha Nensel =

German tennis player

- Country (sports): West Germany; Germany
- Born: 9 May 1970 (age 54); Hanover, West Germany
- Height: 180 cm (5 ft 11 in)
- Plays: Right-handed
- Prize money: $31,912

Singles
- Career record: 0–2
- Highest ranking: No. 179 (10 July 1989)

Grand Slam singles results
- Australian Open: Q3 (1990)
- French Open: Q1 (1993)
- US Open: Q1 (1996)

Doubles
- Highest ranking: No. 300 (22 May 1995)

Sascha Nensel (born 9 May 1970) is a German former professional tennis player.

== Career ==
A right-handed player from Hanover, Nensel reached a career high ranking of ranking of 179 in the world. He won the Montabaur Challenger tournament in 1989 and qualified for the main draw of two ATP Tour events, the German Open and at Buzios, both in 1992.

Nensel is now a tennis coach and runs his own tennis academy in Peine. He is a former coach of Nicolas Kiefer, Julia Görges and Andrea Petkovic. He is currently the coach of Indian tennis player Sumit Nagal.

== Challenger titles ==
=== Singles: (1) ===
No.	Year	Tournament	Surface	Opponent	Score
1.	1989	Montabaur, West Germany	Clay	(West Germany) Jens Wöhrmann	6–3, 6–2
