= Sylvano Simone =

- Country (sports): Italy
- Born: 10 October 1963 (age 61)

Singles
- Highest ranking: No. 731 (Aug 17, 1992)

Grand Slam singles results
- Australian Open: Q1 (1992)

Doubles
- Career record: 0–1
- Highest ranking: No. 486 (Aug 3, 1992)

Sylvano Simone (born 10 October 1963) is an Italian-American tennis coach and former professional player.

Simone played collegiate tennis for the University of Arkansas.

Active on tour in the 1990s, Simone made his only ATP Tour main draw appearance with Mikael Stadling in doubles at the 1993 Kuala Lumpur Open, where they were beaten in the first round by Michael Chang and his brother Carl.
