= Srđan Muškatirović =

Serbian-Yugoslav tennis player

- Country (sports): FR Yugoslavia
- Born: April 10, 1972 (age 54)
- Prize money: $4,755

Singles
- Career record: 1–5
- Highest ranking: No. 317 (14 June 1993)

Grand Slam singles results
- Australian Open: Q2 (1990)

Doubles
- Career record: 0–3
- Highest ranking: No. 274 (14 June 1993)

Grand Slam doubles results
- US Open: 1R (1996)

Team competitions
- Davis Cup: 1–5

Srdjan Muskatirovic (Serbian Cyrillic: Срђан Мушкатировић) (born 10 April 1972) is a former tennis player from Yugoslavia, who represented his native country as a qualifier at the 1992 Summer Olympics in Barcelona, where he was defeated in the first round by Brazil's Jaime Oncins. The right-hander reached his highest singles ATP-ranking on 14 June 1993, when he became the World's No. 317.
