= Laurent Prades =

French tennis player

- Country (sports): France
- Born: 19 July 1968 (age 56); Bordeaux, France
- Height: 1.83 m (6 ft 0 in)
- Plays: Left-handed
- Prize money: $77,467

Singles
- Career record: 4–9
- Career titles: 0
- Highest ranking: No. 180 (6 July 1992)

Grand Slam singles results
- Australian Open: 1R (1989)
- French Open: 2R (1992)

Doubles
- Career record: 1–2
- Career titles: 0
- Highest ranking: No. 341 (20 August 1990)

Laurent Prades (born 19 July 1968) is a former professional tennis player from France.

Prades qualified for his first Grand Slam tournament in 1989, at the Australian Open. He played West German Hans-Dieter Beutel in the opening round and was beaten, despite winning the first two sets. It wasn't until the 1992 French Open that he got another chance to play a Grand Slam, entering the event as a wildcard. He defeated Byron Black in the first round and then met third seed Pete Sampras. The American won in straight sets, although Prades did manage to force two of those sets into tiebreaks.

== Challenger titles ==
=== Singles: (1) ===
No.	Year	Tournament	Surface	Opponent	Score
1.	1991	Gramado, Brazil	Hard	(Brazil) Fernando Roese	7–5, 6–7, 6–4
