= Jan Gunnarsson =

Swedish tennis player (born 1962)

- Country (sports): Sweden
- Residence: Monte Carlo, Monaco
- Born: 30 May 1962 (age 64) Olofström, Sweden
- Height: 1.85 m (6 ft 1 in)
- Turned pro: 1979
- Retired: 1994
- Plays: Right-handed (two-handed backhand)
- Prize money: $1,285,040

Singles
- Career record: 188–204
- Career titles: 1
- Highest ranking: No. 25 (9 December 1985)

Grand Slam singles results
- Australian Open: SF (1989)
- French Open: 4R (1984)
- Wimbledon: 4R (1991)
- US Open: 1R (1986)

Doubles
- Career record: 176–176
- Career titles: 9
- Highest ranking: No. 20 (30 April 1984)

Grand Slam doubles results
- Australian Open: 1R (1989, 1991, 1992)
- French Open: 3R (1986)
- Wimbledon: 2R (1980, 1985, 1986)
- US Open: 1R (1986)

Jan Gunnarsson (Swedish pronunciation: [ˈjɑːn ˈɡɵ̂nːaˌʂɔn]; born 30 May 1962) is a former tennis player from Sweden, who won one singles title in Vienna in 1985 (beating Libor Pimek in the final) and nine doubles titles on the world tour during his professional career. In 1989 he reached the semi-finals of Australian Open where he lost in straight sets to Miloslav Mečíř.

Along with Michael Mortensen he won the longest tie-break in tennis history at Wimbledon in 1985. The Swedish/Danish duo defeated John Frawley and Víctor Pecci in the first round.

The right-hander reached his career-high ATP singles ranking of world No. 25 in December 1985.

== Summer 2012 Olympics controversy ==
Gunnarsson was an expert commentator for the Summer 2012 Olympic Games. His position on Swedish television became controversial after he made xenophobic comments in response to negative comments made by the Swedish Culture and Sports Minister Lena Adelsohn Liljeroth about financial support for future Swedish applications for major championships. On his Facebook page, Gunnarsson posted the comment, "There's not enough money when the state is paying welfare for 27,000 Somalis." His comment was criticized by SVT's sports editor Per Yng, and he removed the comment shortly after.

== Career finals ==
=== Singles (1 title, 4 runner-ups) ===
Result	W/L	Date	Tournament	Surface	Opponent	Score
Loss	0–1	Mar 1984	Metz, France	Carpet	(India) Ramesh Krishnan	3–6, 3–6
Win	1–1	Nov 1985	Vienna, Austria	Carpet	(Czechoslovakia) Libor Pimek	6–7^{(5–7)}, 6–2, 6–4, 1–6, 7–5
Loss	1–2	Oct 1986	Toulouse, France	Hard (i)	(France) Guy Forget	6–4, 3–6, 2–6
Loss	1–3	Jul 1987	Stuttgart, West Germany	Clay	(Czechoslovakia) Miloslav Mečíř	0–6, 2–6
Loss	1–4	May 1991	Bologna, Italy	Clay	(Italy) Paolo Canè	7–5, 3–6, 5–7

=== Doubles (9 titles, 10 runner-ups) ===
Result	W/L	Date	Tournament	Surface	Partner	Opponents	Score
Win	1–0	Nov 1982	Stockholm, Sweden	Hard (i)	(United States) Mark Dickson	(United States) Sherwood Stewart (United States) Ferdi Taygan	7–6, 6–7, 6–4
Win	2–0	Mar 1983	Nancy, France	Hard (i)	(Sweden) Anders Järryd	(Chile) Ricardo Acuña (Chile) Belus Prajoux	7–5, 6–3
Loss	2–1	May 1983	Rome, Italy	Clay	(United States) Mike Leach	(Paraguay) Francisco González (Paraguay) Víctor Pecci	2–6, 7–6, 4–6
Win	3–1	Apr 1984	Nice, France	Clay	(Denmark) Michael Mortensen	(Chile) Hans Gildemeister (Ecuador) Andrés Gómez	6–1, 7–5
Loss	3–2	Apr 1984	Monte Carlo, Monaco	Clay	(Sweden) Mats Wilander	(Australia) Mark Edmondson (United States) Sherwood Stewart	2–6, 1–6
Win	4–2	Jul 1984	Båstad, Sweden	Clay	(Denmark) Michael Mortensen	(Spain) Juan Avendaño (Brazil) Fernando Roese	6–0, 6–0
Loss	4–3	Oct 1984	Cologne, West Germany	Hard (i)	(Sweden) Joakim Nyström	(Poland) Wojciech Fibak (United States) Sandy Mayer	1–6, 3–6
Loss	4–4	Nov 1984	Treviso, Italy	Clay	(United States) Sherwood Stewart	(Czechoslovakia) Pavel Složil (United States) Tim Wilkison	2–6, 3–6
Win	5–4	Nov 1984	Toulouse, France	Carpet	(Denmark) Michael Mortensen	(Czechoslovakia) Pavel Složil (United States) Tim Wilkison	6–4, 6–2
Loss	5–5	Sep 1985	Barcelona, Spain	Clay	(Denmark) Michael Mortensen	(Spain) Sergio Casal (Spain) Emilio Sánchez	3–6, 3–6
Loss	5–6	Oct 1985	Cologne, West Germany	Hard (i)	(Sweden) Peter Lundgren	(Austria) Alex Antonitsch (Netherlands) Michiel Schapers	4–6, 5–7
Loss	5–7	Apr 1986	Cologne, West Germany	Hard (i)	(Sweden) Peter Lundgren	(New Zealand) Kelly Evernden (United States) Chip Hooper	4–6, 7–6, 3–6
Win	6–7	Sep 1986	Barcelona, Spain	Clay	(Sweden) Joakim Nyström	(Peru) Carlos di Laura (Italy) Claudio Panatta	6–3, 6–4
Loss	6–8	Oct 1986	Basel, Switzerland	Hard (i)	(Czechoslovakia) Tomáš Šmíd	(France) Guy Forget (France) Yannick Noah	6–7, 4–6
Win	7–8	Jul 1987	Gstaad, Switzerland	Clay	(Czechoslovakia) Tomáš Šmíd	(France) Loïc Courteau (France) Guy Forget	7–6, 6–2
Loss	7–9	Feb 1989	Rotterdam, Netherlands	Clay	(Sweden) Magnus Gustafsson	(Czechoslovakia) Miloslav Mečíř (Czechoslovakia) Milan Šrejber	6–7, 0–6
Win	8–9	Oct 1989	Vienna, Austria	Carpet	(Sweden) Anders Järryd	(United States) Paul Annacone (New Zealand) Kelly Evernden	6–2, 6–3
Loss	8–10	Jul 1990	Båstad, Sweden	Clay	(West Germany) Udo Riglewski	(Sweden) Rikard Bergh (Sweden) Ronnie Båthman	1–6, 4–6
Win	9–10	Apr 1991	Nice, France	Clay	(Sweden) Rikard Bergh	(Czechoslovakia) Vojtěch Flégl (Sweden) Nicklas Utgren	6–4, 4–6, 6–3
