= Oliver Fuchs =

Austrian tennis player

- Country (sports): Austria
- Born: 16 March 1971 (age 54); Bruck an der Mur, Austria
- Height: 5 ft 11 in (180 cm)
- Plays: Right-handed
- Prize money: $27,536

Singles
- Career record: 0–5
- Highest ranking: No. 217 (10 Sep 1990)

Grand Slam singles results
- Australian Open: 1R (1989)

Doubles
- Highest ranking: No. 541 (10 Sep 1990)

Oliver Fuchs (born 16 March 1971) is an Austrian former professional tennis player.

Born in Bruck an der Mur, Fuchs reached a career high ranking of 217 on the professional tour. He qualified for the main draw of the 1989 Australian Open, beating Jonathan Canter and Martin Sinner en route, then lost in the first-round to Marty Davis in four sets. In 1990 he represented Austria at the World Team Cup.
