= Bilynda Potter =

Australian tennis player

- Country (sports): Australia
- Born: 8 January 1971 (age 54)
- Plays: Right-handed

Singles
- Highest ranking: No. 321 (28 March 1988)

Grand Slam singles results
- Australian Open: Q2 (1989)

Doubles
- Highest ranking: No. 96 (17 August 1987)

Grand Slam doubles results
- Australian Open: 2R (1988)

Bilynda Potter (born 8 January 1971) is an Australian former professional tennis player.

A right-handed player from Sydney, Potter featured twice in the women's doubles main draw at the Australian Open. She had a career best singles ranking of 321 and was ranked as high as 96 in the world in doubles.

== ITF finals ==
=== Singles: 1 (0–1) ===
Outcome	Date	Tournament	Surface	Opponent	Score
Runner-up	13 March 1988	Canberra, Australia	Grass	(Australia) Sally McCann	4–6, 6–3, 4–6

=== Doubles: 1 (0–1) ===
Outcome	Date	Tournament	Surface	Partner	Opponents	Score
Runner-up	16 March 1987	Canberra, Australia	Hard	(Australia) Karen Deed	(Australia) Colleen Carney (Australia) Alison Scott	5–7, 6–7
