= Chuck Merzbacher =

American tennis player and coach

- Full name: Charles Merzbacher, Jr.
- Country (sports): United States
- Born: January 31, 1965 (age 60)
- Height: 6 ft 1 in (185 cm)

Singles
- Career record: 0–1
- Highest ranking: No. 351 (May 29, 1989)

Grand Slam singles results
- Australian Open: 1R (1989)
- Wimbledon: Q2 (1989)

Doubles
- Highest ranking: No. 335 (Aug 7, 1989)

Grand Slam doubles results
- Wimbledon: Q1 (1989)

Charles Merzbacher (born January 31, 1965) is an American tennis coach and former professional player.

== Tennis career ==
Merzbacher is a native of Findlay, Ohio and played collegiate tennis for the University of Minnesota between 1983 and 1987, earning three All-Big Ten selections. He won the USTA National Claycourt Championships in 1984.

In the late 1980s he featured on the professional tour and reached a best singles world ranking of 351. He qualified for the main draw of the 1989 Australian Open, losing in the first round to Magnus Gustafsson.

Currently coaching the University of Tennessee at Chattanooga men's team, Merzbacher has been a head coach in collegiate tennis since 1990. He started out as the men's head coach at Northern Illinois, then was the women's head coach at both Kansas and Ohio State, before returning to his alma mater in 2013.

== Personal life ==
Merzbacher's daughter Caitlyn was also a tennis player for the University of Minnesota and his son Chad is a professional golfer.
