= Mårten Renström =

Swedish tennis player

- Country (sports): Sweden
- Residence: Eastbourne, United Kingdom
- Born: 3 February 1972 (age 53) Mölndal, Sweden
- Height: 1.88 m (6 ft 2 in)
- Turned pro: 1990
- Plays: Right-handed
- Prize money: $75,307

Singles
- Career record: 0–0
- Career titles: 0; 0 Challenger, 0 Futures
- Highest ranking: No. 302 (4 Oct 1993)

Grand Slam singles results
- Australian Open: Q2 (1993)
- US Open: Q2 (1993)

Doubles
- Career record: 11–20
- Career titles: 0; 7 Challenger, 0 Futures
- Highest ranking: No. 105 (24 Jun 1996)

Grand Slam doubles results
- Australian Open: 2R (1994)
- US Open: 3R (1995)
- Last updated on: 12 January 2026.

Mårten Renström (born 3 February 1972) is a former professional tennis player from Sweden.

== Career ==
Renström, with partner Roger Pettersson, was the boys' doubles champion at the 1990 Australian Open. He was also a boys' doubles winner at the 1990 US Open, with Mikael Tillström. They beat the Canadian pairing of Sébastien Leblanc and Greg Rusedski in the final.

In 1992, Renström and Tillström were losing doubles finalists at the Dutch Open.

He made the third round of the men's doubles at the 1995 US Open, with Ola Kristiansson. En route, the pair had a win over 13th seeds Trevor Kronemann and David Macpherson.

== ATP Tour career finals ==
=== Doubles: 1 (0 titles, 1 runner-up) ===
Legend Grand Slam Tournaments (0–0) ATP World Tour Finals (0–0) ATP Masters Series (0–0) ATP Championship Series (0–0) ATP World Series (0–1)	Finals by surface Hard (0–0) Clay (0–1) Grass (0–0) Carpet (0–0)	Finals by setting Outdoors (0–1) Indoors (0–0)

Result	W–L	Date	Tournament	Tier	Surface	Partner	Opponents	Score
Loss	0–1	Jul 1992	Hilversum, Netherlands	World Series	Clay	(Sweden) Mikael Tillström	(Netherlands) Paul Haarhuis (Netherlands) Mark Koevermans	7–6, 1–6, 4–6

== ATP Challenger and ITF Futures finals ==
=== Doubles: 9 (7–2) ===
Legend ATP Challenger (7–2) ITF Futures (0–0)	Finals by surface Hard (0–1) Clay (6–1) Grass (0–0) Carpet (1–0)

Result	W–L	Date	Tournament	Tier	Surface	Partner	Opponents	Score
Win	1–0	Jun 1992	Yvetot, France	Challenger	Clay	(Sweden) Mikael Tillstrom	(Brazil) Jaime Oncins (Czech Republic) Tomáš Anzari	7–6, 5–7, 6–2
Loss	1–1	Nov 1992	Halifax, Canada	Challenger	Hard	(Norway) Christian Ruud	(United States) Ellis Ferreira (United States) Richard Schmidt	6–4, 1–6, 4–6
Win	2–1	May 1993	Bochum, Germany	Challenger	Clay	(Netherlands) Joost Winnink	(Australia) Jon Ireland (Australia) Andrew Kratzmann	6–3, 2–6, 7–5
Win	3–1	Jun 1993	Turin, Italy	Challenger	Clay	(Australia) Andrew Kratzmann	(United States) Brian Joelson (United States) John Sullivan	6–4, 6–0
Win	4–1	Oct 1993	Dublin, Ireland	Challenger	Carpet	(Sweden) Mikael Tillstrom	(United States) Todd Nelson (Norway) Bent-Ove Pedersen	6–2, 3–6, 6–3
Win	5–1	Jul 1994	Scheveningen, Netherlands	Challenger	Clay	(Sweden) Mikael Tillstrom	(Netherlands) Stephen Noteboom (Belgium) Tom Vanhoudt	3–6, 7–5, 6–3
Win	6–1	Jul 1995	Tampere, Finland	Challenger	Clay	(Sweden) Thomas Johansson	(Portugal) Emanuel Couto (Portugal) Bernardo Mota	6–3, 6–3
Win	7–1	May 1996	Dresden, Germany	Challenger	Clay	(Sweden) Ola Kristiansson	(Latvia) Girts Dzelde (Sweden) Tomas Nydahl	3–6, 6–2, 7–5
Loss	7–2	Jul 1996	Tampere, Finland	Challenger	Clay	(Sweden) Ola Kristiansson	(United States) Donald Johnson (United States) Francisco Montana	5–7, 6–7

== Junior Grand Slam finals ==
=== Doubles: 2 (1 title, 1 runner-up) ===
Result	Year	Tournament	Surface	Partner	Opponents	Score
Win	1990	Australian Open	Hard	(Sweden) Roger Pettersson	(Canada) Robert Janecek (Mexico) Ernesto Munoz De Cote	4–6, 7–6^{(7–3)}, 6–1
Loss	1990	US Open	Hard	(Sweden) Mikael Tillstrom	(Canada) Sebastien Leblanc (United Kingdom) Greg Rusedski	7–6, 3–6, 4–6
