= 1989 Australian Open – Men's doubles =

Tennis tournament

Men's doubles
- 1989 Australian Open

Final
- Champion: (United States) Rick Leach (United States) Jim Pugh
- Runner-up: (Australia) Darren Cahill (Australia) Mark Kratzmann
- Score: 6–4, 6–4, 6–4

Details
- Draw: 64
- Seeds: 16

Events
Singles	men	women		boys	girls
Doubles	men	women	mixed	boys	girls
WC Singles	men	women	quad
WC Doubles	men	women	quad
Legends	men	women	mixed
- Australian Open

The men's doubles tournament at the 1989 Australian Open was held from 16 through 29 January 1989 on the outdoor hard courts at the Flinders Park in Melbourne, Australia. Rick Leach and Jim Pugh won the title, defeating Darren Cahill and Mark Kratzmann in the final.

== Seeds ==
1. (Australia) John Fitzgerald / (Sweden) Anders Järryd (quarterfinals)
2. (United States) Rick Leach / (United States) Jim Pugh (champions)
3. (South Africa) Pieter Aldrich / (South Africa) Danie Visser (third round)
4. (United States) Johan Kriek / (Australia) Wally Masur (quarterfinals)
5. (United States) Martin Davis / (Australia) Brad Drewett (semifinals)
6. (France) Guy Forget / (Switzerland) Jakob Hlasek (second round)
7. (Australia) Peter Doohan / (Australia) Laurie Warder (third round)
8. (Canada) Grant Connell / (Canada) Glenn Michibata (quarterfinals)
9. (United States) John McEnroe / (Australia) Mark Woodforde (semifinals)
10. (South Africa) Gary Muller / (South Africa) Christo van Rensburg (third round)
11. (United Kingdom) Jeremy Bates / (Sweden) Peter Lundgren (second round)
12. (Germany) Boris Becker / (Socialist Federal Republic of Yugoslavia) Slobodan Živojinović (second round)
13. (Denmark) Michael Mortensen / (Sweden) Joakim Nyström (first round)
14. (Sweden) Stefan Edberg / (United States) Jim Grabb (quarterfinals)
15. (Australia) Broderick Dyke / (Netherlands) Tom Nijssen (third round)
16. (United States) Kelly Jones / (United States) Joey Rive (third round)

== Draw ==
Key

- Q = Qualifier
- WC = Wild card
- LL = Lucky loser
- Alt = Alternate
- ITF = ITF entry
- PR = Protected ranking
- SR = Special ranking
- SE = Special exempt
- JE = Junior exempt
- JR = Junior Accelerator Programme entrant
- CO = College Accelerator Programme entrant
- NG = Next Gen Accelerator Program entrant
- w/o = Walkover
- r = Retired
- d = Defaulted

=== Finals ===
Quarterfinals
1	(Australia) John Fitzgerald (Sweden) Anders Järryd	6	6	1	5	2
9	(United States) John McEnroe (Australia) Mark Woodforde	3	3	6	7	6
4	(United States) Johan Kriek (Australia) Wally Masur	3	6	3	0
(Australia) Darren Cahill (Australia) Mark Kratzmann	6	3	6	6
5	(United States) Martin Davis (Australia) Brad Drewett	4	6	6	6	6
14	(Sweden) Stefan Edberg (United States) Jim Grabb	6	3	7	3	4
8	(Canada) Grant Connell (Canada) Glenn Michibata	6	7	2	3	4
2	(United States) Rick Leach (United States) Jim Pugh	3	5	6	6	6

Semifinals
9	(United States) John McEnroe (Australia) Mark Woodforde	6	3	4	5
(Australia) Darren Cahill (Australia) Mark Kratzmann	3	6	6	7
5	(United States) Martin Davis (Australia) Brad Drewett	6	7	2	4	7
2	(United States) Rick Leach (United States) Jim Pugh	3	6	6	6	9

Final
(Australia) Darren Cahill (Australia) Mark Kratzmann	4	4	4
2	(United States) Rick Leach (United States) Jim Pugh	6	6	6

=== Top half ===
==== Section 1 ====
First round
1	(Australia) J Fitzgerald (Sweden) A Järryd	6	6
(United States) S Stewart (Australia) K Warwick	2	3
(Australia) R Barlow (Australia) G Pfitzner	7	3	4
(United States) S DeVries (United States) R Matuszewski	5	6	6
(West Germany) P Baur (West Germany) U Riglewski	6	6
(Sweden) J Apell (Sweden) M Gustafsson	1	3
(Austria) T Muster (Czechoslovakia) C Suk	3	3
15	(Australia) B Dyke (Netherlands) T Nijssen	6	6
9	(United States) J McEnroe (Australia) M Woodforde	3	6	6
(Argentina) H de la Peña (United States) D Wheaton	6	3	4
(West Germany) T Meinecke (Sweden) J Svensson	6	6
(West Germany) M Sinner (West Germany) I Werner	3	4
(Australia) M Fancutt (United States) T Mercer	6	6
(Finland) V Paloheimo (United States) F Viancos	2	4
(New Zealand) S Guy (Japan) S Matsuoka	1	1
7	(Australia) P Doohan (Australia) L Warder	6	6

Second round
1	(Australia) J Fitzgerald (Sweden) A Järryd	6	6
(United States) S DeVries (United States) R Matuszewski	3	1
(West Germany) P Baur (West Germany) U Riglewski	7	6	6
15	(Australia) B Dyke (Netherlands) T Nijssen	5	7	8
9	(United States) J McEnroe (Australia) M Woodforde	6	6
(West Germany) T Meinecke (Sweden) J Svensson	1	4
(Australia) M Fancutt (United States) T Mercer	4	4
7	(Australia) P Doohan (Australia) L Warder	6	6

Third round
1	(Australia) J Fitzgerald (Sweden) A Järryd	6	7
15	(Australia) B Dyke (Netherlands) T Nijssen	1	6
9	(United States) J McEnroe (Australia) M Woodforde	7	6
7	(Australia) P Doohan (Australia) L Warder	5	2

Quarterfinals
1	(Australia) J Fitzgerald (Sweden) A Järryd	6	6	1	5	2
9	(United States) J McEnroe (Australia) M Woodforde	3	3	6	7	6

==== Section 2 ====
First round
4	(United States) J Kriek (Australia) W Masur	7	7
(United States) C Beckman (Socialist Federal Republic of Yugoslavia) G Ivanišević	6	6
(West Germany) D Keretić (West Germany) A Mronz	3	3
(United States) P Chamberlin (United States) M Kures	6	6
(Sweden) J Gunnarsson (Sweden) M Tideman	4	2
(United States) J Canter (New Zealand) B Derlin	6	6
(Sweden) N Kroon (Sweden) LA Wahlgren	2	7	8
13	(Denmark) M Mortensen (Sweden) J Nyström	6	6	6
11	(United Kingdom) J Bates (Sweden) P Lundgren	7	2	8
(New Zealand) K Evernden (Israel) A Mansdorf	6	6	6
(Australia) D Cahill (Australia) M Kratzmann	6	7
(United States) R Baxter (South Africa) B Talbot	4	5
Alt	(Japan) H Shirato (Japan) E Takeuchi	2	4
(United Kingdom) N Broad (South Africa) S Kruger	6	6
WC	(Australia) A Florent (Australia) A McLean	6	6	2
6	(France) G Forget (Switzerland) J Hlasek	7	4	6

Second round
4	(United States) J Kriek (Australia) W Masur	6	3	6
(United States) P Chamberlin (United States) M Kures	0	6	3
(United States) J Canter (New Zealand) B Derlin	6	6	6
(Sweden) N Kroon (Sweden) LA Wahlgren	2	7	3
11	(United Kingdom) J Bates (Sweden) P Lundgren	4	3
(Australia) D Cahill (Australia) M Kratzmann	6	6
(United Kingdom) N Broad (South Africa) S Kruger	7	7
6	(France) G Forget (Switzerland) J Hlasek	6	6

Third round
4	(United States) J Kriek (Australia) W Masur	6	3	6
(United States) J Canter (New Zealand) B Derlin	0	6	3
(Australia) D Cahill (Australia) M Kratzmann	6	6	6
(United Kingdom) N Broad (South Africa) S Kruger	2	7	3

Quarterfinals
4	(United States) J Kriek (Australia) W Masur	3	6	3	0
(Australia) D Cahill (Australia) M Kratzmann	6	3	6	6

=== Bottom half ===
==== Section 3 ====
First round
5	(United States) M Davis (Australia) B Drewett	7	4	6
(France) O Delaître (Canada) M Laurendeau	6	6	2
(Netherlands) M Koevermans (Netherlands) M Schapers	6	6
WC	(Australia) A Anderson (Australia) C Turich	1	2
(United States) T Pawsat (Sweden) T Svantesson	4	6	6
(United States) J Barham (Republic of Ireland) P Wright	6	1	2
(Mexico) L Lavalle (West Germany) C Saceanu	6	6	6
12	(West Germany) B Becker (Socialist Federal Republic of Yugoslavia) S Živojinović	7	4	8
14	(Sweden) S Edberg (United States) J Grabb	6	6
(Australia) J Stoltenberg (Australia) T Woodbridge	4	2
(Australia) S Barr (Australia) R Rasheed	3	6
(West Germany) P Kühnen (West Germany) CU Steeb	6	7
WC	(Australia) J Marinov (Australia) B Roe	6	3
WC	(Australia) B Custer (Australia) J Frawley	7	6
WC	(Australia) J Anderson (Australia) R Fromberg	6	3	6
3	(South Africa) P Aldrich (South Africa) D Visser	3	6	8

Second round
5	(United States) M Davis (Australia) B Drewett	6	6
(Netherlands) M Koevermans (Netherlands) M Schapers	1	4
(United States) T Pawsat (Sweden) T Svantesson	7	6
12	(West Germany) B Becker (Socialist Federal Republic of Yugoslavia) S Živojinović	6	4
14	(Sweden) S Edberg (United States) J Grabb	6	6
(West Germany) P Kühnen (West Germany) CU Steeb	4	4
WC	(Australia) B Custer (Australia) J Frawley	1	5
3	(South Africa) P Aldrich (South Africa) D Visser	6	7

Third round
5	(United States) M Davis (Australia) B Drewett	5	6	7
(United States) T Pawsat (Sweden) T Svantesson	7	3	5
14	(Sweden) S Edberg (United States) J Grabb	w/o
3	(South Africa) P Aldrich (South Africa) D Visser

Quarterfinals
5	(United States) M Davis (Australia) B Drewett	4	6	6	6	6
14	(Sweden) S Edberg (United States) J Grabb	6	3	7	3	4

==== Section 4 ====
First round
8	(Canada) G Connell (Canada) G Michibata	3	6	6
(United States) T Siegel (Australia) D Tyson	6	3	4
(United States) J Letts (United States) B Man-Son-Hing	7	6
(Portugal) J Cunha Silva (Italy) G Pozzi	6	2
(Socialist Federal Republic of Yugoslavia) I Flego (Mexico) A Moreno	7	6
(West Germany) H Moraing (West Germany) T Theine	6	4
(The Bahamas) R Smith (Kenya) P Wekesa	4	5
10	(South Africa) G Muller (South Africa) C van Rensburg	6	7
16	(United States) K Jones (United States) J Rive	6	7
(United States) B Garnett (United States) J Klaparda	3	6
(United States) G Layendecker (Brazil) D Marcelino	6	6
(France) T Champion (France) E Winogradsky	3	4
(Italy) D Nargiso (United States) L Shiras	7	2	2
(United States) G Donnelly (United States) P Sampras	6	6	6
(United States) R Reneberg (United States) J Ross	4	2
2	(United States) R Leach (United States) J Pugh	6	6

Second round
8	(Canada) G Connell (Canada) G Michibata	2	6	10
(United States) J Letts (United States) B Man-Son-Hing	6	3	8
(Socialist Federal Republic of Yugoslavia) I Flego (Mexico) A Moreno	1	4
10	(South Africa) G Muller (South Africa) C van Rensburg	6	6
16	(United States) K Jones (United States) J Rive	6	6
(United States) G Layendecker (Brazil) D Marcelino	3	4
(United States) G Donnelly (United States) P Sampras	4	5
2	(United States) R Leach (United States) J Pugh	6	7

Third round
8	(Canada) G Connell (Canada) G Michibata	3	6	6
10	(South Africa) G Muller (South Africa) C van Rensburg	6	4	4
16	(United States) K Jones (United States) J Rive	1	2
2	(United States) R Leach (United States) J Pugh	6	6

Quarterfinals
8	(Canada) G Connell (Canada) G Michibata	6	7	2	3	4
2	(United States) R Leach (United States) J Pugh	3	5	6	6	6
