= Malcolm Allen (tennis) =

American tennis player

- Country (sports): United States
- Born: July 13, 1967 (age 58); Los Angeles, United States
- Height: 5 ft 10 in (178 cm)
- Prize money: $14,760

Singles
- Career record: 1–5
- Highest ranking: No. 217 (February 20, 1989)

Grand Slam singles results
- Australian Open: 2R (1989)

Doubles
- Highest ranking: No. 583 (July 8, 1991)

Malcolm Allen (born July 13, 1967) is an American former professional tennis player.

Born in Los Angeles, Allen played college tennis for San Jose State University and as a senior in 1988 won the PCAA singles championship.

From 1988 to 1991 he competed on the international tour, reaching a career best singles ranking of 217 in the world. He qualified for the main draw of the 1989 Australian Open, where he had a first round win over Martin Laurendeau.
