= Johan Alvén =

Swedish tennis player (born 1972)

- Country (sports): Sweden
- Born: January 13, 1972 (age 53); Landskrona, Sweden
- Plays: Right-handed
- Prize money: $1,674

Singles
- Career record: 0–1 (at ATP Tour level)
- Highest ranking: No. 440 (5 Aug 1996)

Grand Slam singles results
- Australian Open: Q2 (1989)

Doubles
- Highest ranking: No. 332 (20 Sep 1993)

Johan Alvén (born 13 January 1972 in Landskrona, Sweden) is a former professional tennis player from Sweden.

== Tennis career ==
=== Juniors ===
Alvén competed in five Grand Slam tournaments as a junior. He also represented his country at the 1988 NEC World Youth Cup.

=== Pro tour ===
In the Grand Prix tennis circuit, Alvén made his singles main draw debut at the 1988 U.S. Pro Tennis Championships as a wild card. He lost to countryman Magnus Larsson in the first round.

From 1989 to 1996, Alvén tried to make it into the singles main draw of Grand Slam and ATP tournaments on several occasions. However, he failed to do so on all of them: twice at the Australian Open, three times at the Stockholm Open and four times at the Swedish Open.

=== Coaching ===
After retiring, he has worked as a tennis instructor in his native Sweden, and also in Norway and Kuwait.

Alvén coached professional tennis player Joachim Johansson.
