= Markus Zillner =

German tennis player

- Country (sports): Germany
- Born: 19 March 1970 (age 55); Munich, West Germany
- Height: 5 ft 10 in (178 cm)
- Turned pro: 1988
- Plays: Left-handed
- Prize money: $99,911

Singles
- Career record: 5-9
- Career titles: 0
- Highest ranking: No. 143 (22 Jun 1992)

Grand Slam singles results
- French Open: 2R (1992)

Markus Zillner (born 19 March 1970) is a former professional tennis player from Germany.

Zillner was runner-up in the 18s age group of the 1987 German Open.

He made the quarter-finals of the 1991 Austrian Open, held in Kitzbühel. En route he defeated the eighth ranked player in the world, Sergi Bruguera.

In the 1992 French Open, which he entered as a qualifier, Zillner came from two sets down to upset world number 26 Amos Mansdorf in the opening round. He saved four match points in the third set tiebreak. The German met Nicklas Kulti in the second round and played another five set match, but this time wasn't able to finish on top. It would be his only Grand Slam appearance.
