= Andrew McLean (tennis) =

Australian tennis player

- Full name: Andrew McLean
- Country (sports): Australia
- Born: 20 July 1969 (age 55)

Singles
- Career record: 0–1
- Highest ranking: No. 473 (4 November 1991)

Grand Slam singles results
- Australian Open: 1R (1993)

Doubles
- Career record: 0–1
- Highest ranking: No. 406 (7 December 1992)

Grand Slam doubles results
- Australian Open: 1R (1989)

Andrew McLean (born 20 July 1969) is a former professional tennis player from Australia.

== Biography ==
McLean, who grew up in Victoria, made two appearances in the main draw of the Australian Open.

At the 1989 Australian Open he teamed up with regular doubles partner Andrew Florent as a wildcard pairing in the men's doubles. They were beaten in the first round by Guy Forget and Jakob Hlasek but managed to take a set off the sixth seeds.

Having fallen in singles qualifying every year from 1988 to 1992, he was granted a wildcard into the main draw of the 1993 Australian Open, where he lost in the opening round to Fabrice Santoro.
