= Tobias Svantesson =

Swedish tennis player

- Country (sports): Sweden
- Born: 1 April 1963 (age 62) Malmö, Sweden
- Height: 1.93 m (6 ft 4 in)
- Plays: Right-handed
- Prize money: $245,127

Singles
- Career record: 11–23
- Career titles: 0
- Highest ranking: No. 89 (10 October 1988)

Grand Slam singles results
- Australian Open: 1R (1989)
- French Open: 2R (1988)
- Wimbledon: 1R (1988)
- US Open: 2R (1988)

Doubles
- Career record: 60–93
- Career titles: 2
- Highest ranking: No. 65 (24 October 1991)

Grand Slam doubles results
- Australian Open: 2R (1993)
- French Open: 3R (1992)
- Wimbledon: 2R (1988)
- US Open: 1R (1989, 1990)

Mixed doubles

Grand Slam mixed doubles results
- Australian Open: 1R (1989)
- French Open: 1R (1989, 1991)
- Wimbledon: 1R (1989, 1991)

Tobias Svantesson (born 1 April 1963), is a former professional tennis player from Sweden. He enjoyed most of his tennis success while playing doubles. During his career he won 2 doubles titles. He achieved a career-high doubles ranking of world No. 65 in 1991. His career high world ranking in singles was no 89.

He is the father of the professional soccer player Ian Svantesson.

== Career finals ==
=== Doubles (2 titles, 1 runner-up) ===
Result	W/L	Date	Tournament	Surface	Partner	Opponents	Score
Win	1–0	Mar 1989	Nancy, France	Hard (i)	(Germany) Udo Riglewski	(Portugal) João Cunha e Silva (Belgium) Eduardo Masso	6–4, 6–7, 7–6
Win	2–0	May 1989	Charleston, U.S.	Clay	(Sweden) Mikael Pernfors	(Mexico) Agustín Moreno (Peru) Jaime Yzaga	6–4, 4–6, 7–5
Loss	2–1	Oct 1992	Tel Aviv, Israel	Hard	(Netherlands) Mark Koevermans	(United States) Mike Bauer (Portugal) João Cunha e Silva	3–6, 4–6
