= Robert Janecek =

Canadian tennis player

- Country (sports): Canada
- Born: June 9, 1972 (age 52); Toronto, Ontario
- Height: 6 ft 0 in (183 cm)
- Prize money: $11,956

Singles
- Career record: 0–1
- Highest ranking: No. 453 (May 27, 1991)

Grand Slam singles results
- Australian Open: Q1 (1990)

Doubles
- Career record: 1–3
- Highest ranking: No. 479 (Aug 26, 1996)
Medal record
Universiade
Bronze medal – third place	1993 Buffalo	Men's doubles

Robert Janecek (born June 9, 1972) is a Canadian former professional tennis player.

Born in Toronto, Janecek won a Sunshine Cup title with the junior national team in 1989 and was a boys' doubles finalist at the 1990 Australian Open.

Janecek reached best rankings on the professional tour of 453 in singles and 479 in doubles. He featured in qualifying at the Australian Open and had main draw appearances at the Canadian Open.

From 1992 to 1995 he played collegiate tennis for the UCLA Bruins, where he was a three-time All-American and served as captain for two years. He won a bronze medal for Canada in men's doubles at 1993 Summer Universiade.

Graduating from UCLA in 1995, Janecek completed an MBA at Vanderbilt University and is now working in finance.
