= 1989 Australian Open – Women's singles =

Women's singles
- 1989 Australian Open

Final
- Champion: (Germany) Steffi Graf
- Runner-up: (Czechoslovakia) Helena Suková
- Score: 6–4, 6–4

Details
- Draw: 128
- Seeds: 16

Events
Singles	men	women		boys	girls
Doubles	men	women	mixed	boys	girls
WC Singles	men	women	quad
WC Doubles	men	women	quad
Legends	men	women	mixed
- Australian Open

Defending champion Steffi Graf defeated Helena Suková in the final, 6–4, 6–4 to win the women's singles tennis title at the 1989 Australian Open. It was her second Australian Open title and sixth major title overall, and her fifth consecutive major championship. For the second consecutive year, Graf did not lose a set during the tournament.

== Seeds ==
The seeded players are listed below. Steffi Graf is the champion; others show the round in which they were eliminated.

1. (West Germany) Steffi Graf (champion)
2. (United States) Martina Navratilova (quarterfinals)
3. (Argentina) Gabriela Sabatini (semifinals)
4. (United States) Pam Shriver (third round)
5. (Czechoslovakia) Helena Suková (finalist)
6. (United States) Zina Garrison (quarterfinals)
7. (United States) Barbara Potter (first round)
8. (West Germany) Claudia Kohde-Kilsch (quarterfinals)
9. (United States) Lori McNeil (first round)
10. (United States) Mary Joe Fernández (third round)
11. (West Germany) Sylvia Hanika (first round)
12. (United States) Patty Fendick (second round)
13. (Italy) Raffaella Reggi (fourth round)
14. (Australia) Anne Minter (second round)
15. (Australia) Hana Mandlíková (fourth round)
16. (Australia) Nicole Provis (fourth round)

== Draw ==
=== Key ===
- Q = Qualifier
- WC = Wild card
- LL = Lucky loser
- r = Retired

=== Finals ===
Quarterfinals
1	(West Germany) Steffi Graf	6	6
8	(West Germany) Claudia Kohde-Kilsch	2	3
3	(Argentina) Gabriela Sabatini	6	2	6
6	(United States) Zina Garrison	4	6	4
(New Zealand) Belinda Cordwell	6	2	6
(Sweden) Catarina Lindqvist	2	6	1
5	(Czechoslovakia) Helena Suková	6	3	9
2	(United States) Martina Navratilova	2	6	7

Semifinals
1	(West Germany) Steffi Graf	6	6
3	(Argentina) Gabriela Sabatini	3	0
(New Zealand) Belinda Cordwell	6^{2}	6	2
5	(Czechoslovakia) Helena Suková	7^{7}	4	6

Finals
1	(West Germany) Steffi Graf	6	6
5	(Czechoslovakia) Helena Suková	4	4

=== Earlier rounds ===
==== Section 1 ====
First round
1	(West Germany) S Graf	6	6
WC	(Australia) K-A Guse	2	1
(Canada) R Simpson	4	6	6
(Italy) C Caverzasio	6	1	0
(United States) M Werdel	6	6
(United States) B Herr	1	3
(Japan) A Nishiya	3
(West Germany) M Pawlik	0	r
(United States) A Frazier	6	6
(Japan) M Yanagi	2	4
(France) A Dechaume	6	7^{7}
WC	(Australia) J Taylor	2	6^{3}
(Canada) J Hetherington	7^{7}	6
(Netherlands) H Witvoet	6^{2}	1
(Australia) J-A Faull	4	2
16	(Australia) N Provis	6	6

Second round
1	(West Germany) S Graf	6	6
(Canada) R Simpson	0	0
(United States) M Werdel	2	6	6
(Japan) A Nishiya	6	4	2
(United States) A Frazier	6	6
(France) A Dechaume	3	3
(Canada) J Hetherington	4	3
16	(Australia) N Provis	6	6

Third round
1	(West Germany) S Graf	6	6
(United States) M Werdel	0	1
(United States) A Frazier	6	4	3
16	(Australia) N Provis	3	6	6

Fourth round
1	(West Germany) S Graf	6	6
16	(Australia) N Provis	4	0

==== Section 2 ====
First round
9	(United States) L McNeil	1	6	4
Q	(Japan) Y Koizumi	6	4	6
(France) N Guerrée	7	6
WC	(Australia) S McCann	5	4
(United States) D Faber	6	6
(Netherlands) C Bakkum	1	0
(West Germany) C Porwik	6	6^{3}	6
(United States) S Collins	3	7^{7}	2
Q	(United States) A Farley	6	6
(United States) J Santrock	3	3
(Czechoslovakia) P Langrová	6	7^{7}
(West Germany) V Martinek	2	6^{4}
(France) M-C Damas	6	6
(Sweden) J Jonerup	0	0
(Switzerland) C Cohen	6	1	3
8	(West Germany) C Kohde-Kilsch	4	6	6

Second round
Q	(Japan) Y Koizumi	1	1
(France) N Guerrée	6	6
(United States) D Faber	7	6
(West Germany) C Porwik	5	3
Q	(United States) A Farley	6	3	6
(Czechoslovakia) P Langrová	1	6	1
(France) M-C Damas	6	1	1
8	(West Germany) C Kohde-Kilsch	2	6	6

Third round
(France) N Guerrée	2	1
(United States) D Faber	6	6
Q	(United States) A Farley	3	6	2
8	(West Germany) C Kohde-Kilsch	6	3	6

Fourth round
(United States) D Faber	3	3
8	(West Germany) C Kohde-Kilsch	6	6

==== Section 3 ====
First round
3	(Argentina) G Sabatini	6	6
(Sweden) C Dahlman	0	1
(Spain) C Martínez	6	6
(Czechoslovakia) E Švíglerová	0	2
(United States) C Benjamin	6	6
(United Kingdom) M Javer	2	4
(South Africa) D Van Rensburg	4	7	6
(United States) A Ivan	6	5	1
(France) N Herreman	7	7
(Australia) W Turnbull	5	5
(United Kingdom) J Durie	6	6
(United States) L Allen	2	4
(West Germany) C Singer	2	6	6
WC	(Australia) M Bowrey	6	3	0
WC	(Australia) L Stacey	2	6^{3}
13	(Italy) R Reggi	6	7^{7}

Second round
3	(Argentina) G Sabatini	3	6	6
(Spain) C Martínez	6	1	2
(United States) C Benjamin	6	6
(South Africa) D Van Rensburg	3	4
(France) N Herreman	6^{6}	3
(United Kingdom) J Durie	7^{8}	6
(West Germany) C Singer	0	4
13	(Italy) R Reggi	6	6

Third round
3	(Argentina) G Sabatini	6	6
(United States) C Benjamin	0	0
(United Kingdom) J Durie	2	2
13	(Italy) R Reggi	6	6

Fourth round
3	(Argentina) G Sabatini	6	4	6
13	(Italy) R Reggi	0	6	1

==== Section 4 ====
First round
11	(West Germany) S Hanika	3	1
(United States) E Burgin	6	6
(Australia) L Field	2	6	6
(Australia) E Smylie	6	4	3
WC	(Australia) R Stubbs	6	6
(Australia) E Minter	2	4
(United States) C Macgregor	6	7^{9}
Q	(Luxembourg) K Kschwendt	4	6^{7}
Q	(United States) K Kessaris	6	6
Q	(Japan) T Takagi	1	4
(Sweden) M Strandlund	2	7	6
(Belgium) A Devries	6	5	4
(Belgium) S Wasserman	6	6
(United States) L Poruri	4	4
(Sweden) M Lindström	1	3
6	(United States) Z Garrison	6	6

Second round
(United States) E Burgin	6	6
(Australia) L Field	4	4
WC	(Australia) R Stubbs	6	0	2
(United States) C Macgregor	2	6	6
Q	(United States) K Kessaris	6	3	6
(Sweden) M Strandlund	3	6	4
(Belgium) S Wasserman	6^{3}	6	4
6	(United States) Z Garrison	7^{7}	4	6

Third round
(United States) E Burgin	7	5	4
(United States) C Macgregor	5	7	6
Q	(United States) K Kessaris	0	0
6	(United States) Z Garrison	6	6

Fourth round
(United States) C Macgregor	5	1
6	(United States) Z Garrison	7	6

==== Section 5 ====
First round
7	(United States) B Potter	3	3
(New Zealand) B Cordwell	6	6
(United States) B Bowes	1	6	6
(Italy) L Golarsa	6	4	4
WC	(Hungary) A Temesvári	6	6
Q	(United States) J Fuchs	1	1
(United States) K Keil	6	6^{4}	6
(United States) K Horvath	0	7^{7}	4
(Italy) F Bonsignori	7^{7}	7
(West Germany) S Meier	6^{5}	5
(Australia) M Jaggard	6	2	7
(Poland) R Baranski	4	6	5
(Netherlands) B Schultz	6	6
(Czechoslovakia) I Budařová	4	3
(Japan) E Inoue	6	0	5
14	(Australia) A Minter	2	6	7

Second round
(New Zealand) B Cordwell	3	6	12
(United States) B Bowes	6	3	10
WC	(Hungary) A Temesvári	4	7^{7}	6
(United States) K Keil	6	6^{4}	4
(Italy) F Bonsignori	4	6	8
(Australia) M Jaggard	6	3	10
(Netherlands) B Schultz	6	3	6
14	(Australia) A Minter	4	6	1

Third round
(New Zealand) B Cordwell	1	7^{7}	6
WC	(Hungary) A Temesvári	6	6^{5}	1
(Australia) M Jaggard	4	2
(Netherlands) B Schultz	6	6

Fourth round
(New Zealand) B Cordwell	6	6
(Netherlands) B Schultz	3	2

==== Section 6 ====
First round
12	(United States) P Fendick	4	6	6
(United States) H Cioffi	6	4	3
(United States) R Reis	2	6	6
(Brazil) G Miró	6	4	2
(Austria) J Wiesner	6	6
(Switzerland) S Jaquet	3	3
(France) E Derly	6	6
(Czechoslovakia) R Maršíková	4	1
(Sweden) C Lindqvist	6	6
(United States) G Magers	3	2
(United States) L Antonoplis	6	2	6
(United States) C Christian	2	6	1
(United Kingdom) S Loosemore	6	1	6
(Netherlands) N Jagerman	2	6	3
(Australia) R McQuillan	4	1
4	(United States) P Shriver	6	6

Second round
12	(United States) P Fendick	4	6^{4}
(United States) R Reis	6	7^{7}
(Austria) J Wiesner	6	6
(France) E Derly	1	2
(Sweden) C Lindqvist	0	6	6
(United States) L Antonoplis	6	2	3
(United Kingdom) S Loosemore	6	3	4
4	(United States) P Shriver	1	6	6

Third round
(United States) R Reis	4	4
(Austria) J Wiesner	6	6
(Sweden) C Lindqvist	0	6	8
4	(United States) P Shriver	6	4	6

Fourth round
(Austria) J Wiesner	5	2
(Sweden) C Lindqvist	7	6

==== Section 7 ====
First round
5	(Czechoslovakia) H Suková	7	6
(New Zealand) J Richardson	5	0
(United States) H Ludloff	6	2	6
(France) K Quentrec	4	6	4
WC	(Australia) L O'Neill	6	6
(Poland) I Kuczyńska	2	4
(Switzerland) E Krapl	7^{7}	6
(United States) A Henricksson	6^{4}	1
(Peru) P Vásquez	6	4	6
Q	(Netherlands) H ter Riet	4	6	1
(France) C Tanvier	3	6	6
(United States) L-A Eldredge	6	3	2
(United States) A Grossman	3	6	6
(West Germany) S Auer	6	3	4
(United States) T Phelps	1	6	1
10	(United States) M J Fernández	6	4	6

Second round
5	(Czechoslovakia) H Suková	7	6
(United States) H Ludloff	5	3
WC	(Australia) L O'Neill	6	7^{7}
(Switzerland) E Krapl	2	6^{4}
(Peru) P Vásquez	3	6	2
(France) C Tanvier	6	4	6
(United States) A Grossman	4	6^{1}
10	(United States) M J Fernández	6	7^{7}

Third round
5	(Czechoslovakia) H Suková	6	6
WC	(Australia) L O'Neill	2	1
(France) C Tanvier	6	6
10	(United States) M J Fernández	2	3

Fourth round
5	(Czechoslovakia) H Suková	7	6
(France) C Tanvier	5	4

==== Section 8 ====
First round
15	(Australia) H Mandlíková	4	6	6
(United Kingdom) C Wood	6	2	3
(West Germany) E Pfaff	6	6
(France) S Niox-Château	3	1
(United States) K Adams	6^{3}	6	7
(West Germany) W Probst	7^{7}	3	5
(Netherlands) M Bollegraf	6	6
(France) J Halard	3	3
(Czechoslovakia) J Novotná	7	7
Q	(United States) J Ingram	5	5
(United States) C Cunningham	6	6
(Australia) D Balestrat	4	3
(Australia) J Byrne	6	6
(Netherlands) S Schilder	0	2
(West Germany) A Betzner	0	1
2	(United States) M Navratilova	6	6

Second round
15	(Australia) H Mandlíková	4	6	6
(West Germany) E Pfaff	6	1	4
(United States) K Adams	7^{8}	2	3
(Netherlands) M Bollegraf	6^{6}	6	6
(Czechoslovakia) J Novotná	6	6
(United States) C Cunningham	2	2
(Australia) J Byrne	4	6^{7}
2	(United States) M Navratilova	6	7^{9}

Third round
15	(Australia) H Mandlíková	3	6	9
(Netherlands) M Bollegraf	6	3	7
(Czechoslovakia) J Novotná	2	2
2	(United States) M Navratilova	6	6

Fourth round
15	(Australia) H Mandlíková	4	1
2	(United States) M Navratilova	6	6

Preceded by 1988 US Open – Women's singles	Grand Slam women's singles	Succeeded by 1989 French Open – Women's singles
