= 1989 Australian Open – Men's singles =

Men's singles
- 1989 Australian Open

Final
- Champion: (Czechoslovakia) Ivan Lendl
- Runner-up: (Czechoslovakia) Miloslav Mečíř
- Score: 6–2, 6–2, 6–2

Details
- Draw: 128
- Seeds: 16

Events
Singles	men	women		boys	girls
Doubles	men	women	mixed	boys	girls
WC Singles	men	women	quad
WC Doubles	men	women	quad
Legends	men	women	mixed
- Australian Open

Ivan Lendl defeated Miloslav Mečíř in the final, 6–2, 6–2, 6–2 to win the men's singles tennis title at the 1989 Australian Open. It was his first Australian Open title and seventh major singles title overall.

Mats Wilander was the defending champion, but lost in the second round to Ramesh Krishnan.

This was the first Australian Open in which future world No. 1, two-time champion and 14-time major singles champion Pete Sampras competed in the main draw.

By Wilander losing in the second round and Stefan Edberg withdrawing in the quarterfinals, this would end their streak of winning the last 5 Australian Open titles by the Swedish duo.

== Seeds ==
The seeded players are listed below. Ivan Lendl is the champion; others show the round in which they were eliminated.

1. (Sweden) Mats Wilander (second round)
2. (Czechoslovakia) Ivan Lendl (champion)
3. (West Germany) Boris Becker (fourth round)
4. (Sweden) Stefan Edberg (quarterfinals, withdrew)
5. (Switzerland) Jakob Hlasek (first round)
6. (France) Henri Leconte (first round)
7. (United States) John McEnroe (quarterfinals)
8. (France) Yannick Noah (first round)
9. (Czechoslovakia) Miloslav Mečíř (final)
10. (United States) Aaron Krickstein (fourth round)
11. (Austria) Thomas Muster (semifinals)
12. (Sweden) Mikael Pernfors (third round)
13. (Australia) Pat Cash (fourth round)
14. (Sweden) Jonas Svensson (quarterfinals)
15. (Australia) John Fitzgerald (second round)
16. (Israel) Amos Mansdorf (fourth round)

== Draw ==
Key

- Q = Qualifier
- WC = Wild card
- LL = Lucky loser
- Alt = Alternate
- ITF = ITF entry
- PR = Protected ranking
- SR = Special ranking
- SE = Special exempt
- JE = Junior exempt
- JR = Junior Accelerator Programme entrant
- CO = College Accelerator Programme entrant
- NG = Next Gen Accelerator Program entrant
- w/o = Walkover
- r = Retired
- d = Defaulted

=== Finals ===
Quarterfinals
Q	(Socialist Federal Republic of Yugoslavia) Goran Ivanišević	5	0	3
9	(Czechoslovakia) Miloslav Mečíř	7	6	6
14	(Sweden) Jonas Svensson	0	3	6	4
(Sweden) Jan Gunnarsson	6	6	4	6
11	(Austria) Thomas Muster	w/o
4	(Sweden) Stefan Edberg
7	(United States) John McEnroe	6	2	6
2	(Czechoslovakia) Ivan Lendl	7	6	7

Semifinals
9	(Czechoslovakia) Miloslav Mečíř	7	6	6
(Sweden) Jan Gunnarsson	5	2	2
11	(Austria) Thomas Muster	2	4	7	5
2	(Czechoslovakia) Ivan Lendl	6	6	5	7

Final
9	(Czechoslovakia) Miloslav Mečíř	2	2	2
2	(Czechoslovakia) Ivan Lendl	6	6	6

=== Top half ===
==== Section 1 ====
First round
1	(Sweden) M Wilander	6	2	7	5	6
(Sweden) T Svantesson	3	6	5	7	3
(India) R Krishnan	7	6	4	7
Q	(South Africa) B Talbot	6	3	6	5
(Finland) V Paloheimo	6	3	6	3	6
(South Africa) P Aldrich	3	6	3	6	4
(Mexico) L Lavalle	7	2	7	6
(United States) L Shiras	6	6	6	2
(Netherlands) T Nijssen	7	4
(Australia) S Youl	5	1	r
(Socialist Federal Republic of Yugoslavia) S Živojinović	6	6	6	6
(Australia) R Fromberg	7	4	2	3
Q	(Socialist Federal Republic of Yugoslavia) G Ivanišević	6	6	2	7
Q	(Sweden) M Larsson	3	4	6	6
(Australia) S Barr	3	4	4
15	(Australia) J Fitzgerald	6	6	6

Second round
1	(Sweden) M Wilander	3	2	6
(India) R Krishnan	6	6	7
(Finland) V Paloheimo	0	6	2	1
(Mexico) L Lavalle	6	1	6	6
(Netherlands) T Nijssen	6	6	3	6
(Socialist Federal Republic of Yugoslavia) S Živojinović	3	2	6	3
Q	(Socialist Federal Republic of Yugoslavia) G Ivanišević	6	4	6	6
15	(Australia) J Fitzgerald	3	6	3	4

Third round
(India) R Krishnan	5	4	6	3
(Mexico) L Lavalle	7	6	3	6
(Netherlands) T Nijssen	4	4	0
Q	(Socialist Federal Republic of Yugoslavia) G Ivanišević	6	6	6

Fourth round
(Mexico) L Lavalle	6	6	3	4	1
Q	(Socialist Federal Republic of Yugoslavia) G Ivanišević	3	3	6	6	6

==== Section 2 ====
First round
9	(Czechoslovakia) M Mečíř	6	6	6
(France) T Champion	3	2	2
(France) G Forget	3	7	6	2
(Australia) M Kratzmann	6	5	7	6
WC	(Australia) I Peter-Budge	0	5	0
(Sweden) A Järryd	6	7	6
(South Africa) P Norval	3	6	6	2	1
(Australia) J Stoltenberg	6	3	0	6	6
(South Africa) C van Rensburg	6	6	4	6
Q	(United States) T Mercer	2	3	6	1
(Czechoslovakia) C Suk	6	6	1	2
(South Africa) N Broad	3	7	6	6
(Brazil) D Marcelino	3	6	5	7	6
(Sweden) J Apell	6	3	7	5	4
(Australia) M Woodforde	6	6	6	6	6
8	(France) Y Noah	4	7	2	7	4

Second round
9	(Czech Republic) M Mečíř	6	6	7	6
(Australia) M Kratzmann	2	7	6	2
(Sweden) A Järryd	3	6	7	5
(Australia) J Stoltenberg	6	7	5	7
(South Africa) C van Rensburg	6	6	5	1	6
(South Africa) N Broad	3	3	7	6	2
(Brazil) D Marcelino	4	0	2
(Australia) M Woodforde	6	6	6

Third round
9	(Czech Republic) M Mečíř	6	6	6
(Australia) J Stoltenberg	2	1	3
(South Africa) C van Rensburg	2	6	6	6	6
(Australia) M Woodforde	6	2	7	4	0

Fourth round
9	(Czech Republic) M Mečíř	6	6	6
(South Africa) C van Rensburg	4	1	0

==== Section 3 ====
First round
3	(West Germany) B Becker	6	3	6	6
(New Zealand) S Guy	2	6	2	1
(New Zealand) K Evernden	7	6	6
WC	(Australia) A Anderson	6	3	4
(Canada) C Pridham	4	7	6	6
(Australia) B Drewett	6	5	3	0
(United States) M Kures	2	4	2
(United States) G Layendecker	6	6	6
(Australia) W Masur	6	6	6
(Australia) J Anderson	4	4	2
(Sweden) J Carlsson	6	4	6
(Japan) S Matsuoka	7	6	7
(West Germany) H-D Beutel	0	4	6	6	6
Q	(France) L Prades	6	6	4	3	1
(Netherlands) M Oosting	2	0	4
14	(Sweden) J Svensson	6	6	6

Second round
3	(Germany) B Becker	7	6	6
(New Zealand) K Evernden	5	1	3
(Canada) C Pridham	6	2	6	7	12
(United States) G Layendecker	7	6	3	6	10
(Australia) W Masur	6	6	6
(Japan) S Matsuoka	3	1	3
(Germany) H-D Beutel	3	4	3
14	(Sweden) J Svensson	6	6	6

Third round
3	(Germany) B Becker	6	6	6
(Canada) C Pridham	0	1	2
(Australia) W Masur	6	2	3	3
14	(Sweden) J Svensson	4	6	6	6

Fourth round
3	(Germany) B Becker	6	4	3
14	(Sweden) J Svensson	7	6	6

==== Section 4 ====
First round
12	(Sweden) M Pernfors	6	6	6
Q	(France) G Raoux	0	4	1
WC	(Australia) L Warder	6	4	6	6	2
(West Germany) T Meinecke	4	6	0	7	6
(Portugal) N Marques	3	4	4
(Netherlands) M Schapers	6	6	6
(United States) M Davis	2	7	6	6
Q	(Austria) O Fuchs	6	5	3	0
(United States) P Chamberlin	6	4	3	6	6
(Sweden) J Nyström	2	6	6	2	4
(Sweden) L-A Wahlgren	6	2	4	6
(West Germany) D Keretić	4	6	6	7
(West Germany) C Saceanu	6	6	7
(United States) P Sampras	4	4	6
(Sweden) J Gunnarsson	6	6	6
6	(France) H Leconte	4	3	2

Second round
12	(Sweden) M Pernfors	6	6	6
(Germany) T Meinecke	2	3	2
(Netherlands) M Schapers	6	7	6	6
(United States) M Davis	7	6	1	2
(United States) P Chamberlin	6	7	6	4	7
(Germany) D Keretić	7	6	3	6	9
(Germany) C Saceanu	1	2	7	6	1
(Sweden) J Gunnarsson	6	6	6	4	6

Third round
12	(Sweden) M Pernfors	7	5	6	0
(Netherlands) M Schapers	6	7	7	6
(Germany) D Keretić	3	4	6	3
(Sweden) J Gunnarsson	6	6	3	6

Fourth round
(Netherlands) M Schapers	6	1	2
(Sweden) J Gunnarsson	7	6	6

=== Bottom half ===
==== Section 5 ====
First round
5	(Switzerland) J Hlasek	4	7	3	6
(Australia) D Cahill	6	6	6	7
(France) O Delaître	7	6	1	6
(United States) J Pugh	6	3	6	3
(Sweden) M Gustafsson	7	6	7
Q	(United States) C Merzbacher	5	3	5
(Sweden) P Lundgren	3	3	1
(Argentina) H de la Peña	6	6	6
WC	(Australia) J Marinov	2	1	2
(South Africa) D Visser	6	6	6
(Canada) G Michibata	6	6	6	0
(Australia) J Frawley	7	3	7	6
(Socialist Federal Republic of Yugoslavia) B Orešar	6	6	6	6	4
(Kenya) P Wekesa	7	3	0	7	6
(United States) J Rive	4	2	4
11	(Austria) T Muster	6	6	6

Second round
(Australia) D Cahill	4	6	6	6
(France) O Delaître	6	1	1	1
(Sweden) M Gustafsson	6	7	6
(Argentina) H de la Peña	3	5	2
(South Africa) D Visser	7	6	7
(Australia) J Frawley	6	3	6
(Kenya) P Wekesa	6	6	2	3
11	(Austria) T Muster	4	7	6	6

Third round
(Australia) D Cahill	7	6	5	2	4
(Sweden) M Gustafsson	6	0	7	6	6
(South Africa) D Visser	7	3	6	3	9
11	(Austria) T Muster	6	6	3	6	11

Fourth round
(Sweden) M Gustafsson	3	2	5
11	(Austria) T Muster	6	6	7

==== Section 6 ====
First round
13	(Australia) P Cash	6	6	6
WC	(Australia) B Custer	3	1	1
(United States) R Reneberg	7	3	6	6
(Italy) D Nargiso	6	6	4	0
(United Kingdom) J Bates	6	3	6	6
WC	(Australia) J Morgan	2	6	1	4
(United States) J Grabb	6	3	4	6	3
(Italy) G Pozzi	4	6	6	3	6
WC	(Australia) P Carter	7	3	2	3
(United States) J Kriek	6	6	6	6
(Australia) T Woodbridge	0	7	7	6
(United States) J Brown	6	6	6	0
(West Germany) H Moraing	6	6	1
(France) T Tulasne	2	2	0	r
(The Bahamas) R Smith	4	6	4	3
4	(Sweden) S Edberg	6	3	6	6

Second round
13	(Australia) P Cash	6	6	6	4	6
(United States) R Reneberg	3	3	7	6	3
(United Kingdom) J Bates	6	6	6
(Italy) G Pozzi	4	3	4
(United States) J Kriek	7	6	6
(Australia) T Woodbridge	5	3	1
(Germany) H Moraing	4	5	5
4	(Sweden) S Edberg	6	7	7

Third round
13	(Australia) P Cash	7	6	6
(United Kingdom) J Bates	6	2	3
(United States) J Kriek	5	5	5
4	(Sweden) S Edberg	7	7	7

Fourth round
13	(Australia) P Cash	4	0	2
4	(Sweden) S Edberg	6	6	6

==== Section 7 ====
First round
7	(United States) J McEnroe	6	7	2	6
(West Germany) M Westphal	4	5	6	2
(Australia) B Dyke	6	6	6
Q	(United States) K Kinnear	3	2	4
Q	(United States) D Wheaton	2	3	3
(West Germany) P Kühnen	6	6	6
(Netherlands) M Koevermans	6	6	6
(South Africa) G Muller	1	4	4
(Sweden) N Kroon	6	7	6
Q	(South Africa) C Honey	0	5	4
(Portugal) J Cunha Silva	4	4	6
(Canada) G Connell	6	6	7
(Australia) P Doohan	5	5	3
(United States) J Tarango	7	7	6
(West Germany) U Riglewski	5	6	4	1
10	(United States) A Krickstein	7	2	6	6

Second round
7	(United States) J McEnroe	6	4	6	6
(Australia) B Dyke	2	6	4	3
(Germany) P Kühnen	6	6	7
(Netherlands) M Koevermans	1	4	6
(Sweden) N Kroon	7	7	6
(Canada) G Connell	6	6	3
(United States) J Tarango	3	0	2
10	(United States) A Krickstein	6	6	6

Third round
7	(United States) J McEnroe	6	7	6
(Germany) P Kühnen	2	5	2
(Sweden) N Kroon	4	5	4
10	(United States) A Krickstein	6	7	6

Fourth round
7	(United States) J McEnroe	7	6	6
10	(United States) A Krickstein	6	2	3

==== Section 8 ====
First round
16	(Israel) A Mansdorf	6	6	6	7
Q	(United States) R Leach	7	2	4	6
(United States) R Matuszewski	6	6	6
WC	(Australia) C Turich	4	2	4
Q	(South Korea) Y-m Kwon	2	3	2
Q	(United States) B Garnett	6	6	6
Q	(United States) M Allen	4	6	6	6
(Canada) M Laurendeau	6	3	4	4
(Sweden) N Kulti	6	3	7	6
LL	(United Kingdom) C Bailey	2	6	5	1
(West Germany) P Baur	4	6	4
(France) E Winogradsky	6	7	6
(West Germany) C-U Steeb	6	6	6
(Mexico) A Moreno	1	4	2
(West Germany) A Mronz	0	1	3
2	(Czechoslovakia) I Lendl	6	6	6

Second round
16	(Israel) A Mansdorf	6	6	7
(United States) R Matuszewski	2	2	5
Q	(United States) B Garnett	4	6	6	6
Q	(United States) M Allen	6	4	2	2
(Sweden) N Kulti	6	7	5	6
(France) E Winogradsky	2	6	7	2
(Germany) C-U Steeb	2	6	0	3
2	(Czech Republic) I Lendl	6	3	6	6

Third round
16	(Israel) A Mansdorf	6	7	6
Q	(United States) B Garnett	2	5	2
(Sweden) N Kulti	2	4	3
2	(Czech Republic) I Lendl	6	6	6

Fourth round
16	(Israel) A Mansdorf	6	4	2
2	(Czech Republic) I Lendl	7	6	6

Preceded by 1988 US Open	Grand Slam men's singles	Succeeded by 1989 French Open
