= 1989 Australian Open – Mixed doubles =

Mixed doubles
- 1989 Australian Open

Final
- Champions: (Czechoslovakia) Jana Novotná (United States) Jim Pugh
- Runners-up: (United States) Zina Garrison (United States) Sherwood Stewart
- Score: 6–3, 6–4

Details
- Draw: 32
- Seeds: 8

Events
Singles	men	women		boys	girls
Doubles	men	women	mixed	boys	girls
WC Singles	men	women	quad
WC Doubles	men	women	quad
Legends	men	women	mixed
- Australian Open

Jana Novotná and Jim Pugh were the defending champions and won in the final 6–3, 6–4 against Zina Garrison and Sherwood Stewart.

== Seeds ==
Champion seeds are indicated in bold text while text in italics indicates the round in which those seeds were eliminated.

1. (Czechoslovakia) **Jana Novotná** / (United States) **Jim Pugh (champions)**
2. (Australia) Elizabeth Smylie / (Australia) John Fitzgerald (quarterfinals)
3. n/a
4. (United States) Patty Fendick / (United States) Rick Leach (quarterfinals)
5. (United States) Katrina Adams / (United States) Martin Davis (first round)
6. (Canada) Jill Hetherington / (Canada) Grant Connell (second round)
7. (United States) Elise Burgin / (Australia) Peter Doohan (semifinals)
8. (Australia) Nicole Provis / (United States) Johan Kriek (second round)

== Draw ==
Key

- Q = Qualifier
- WC = Wild card
- LL = Lucky loser
- Alt = Alternate
- ITF = ITF entry
- PR = Protected ranking
- SR = Special ranking
- SE = Special exempt
- JE = Junior exempt
- JR = Junior Accelerator Programme entrant
- CO = College Accelerator Programme entrant
- NG = Next Gen Accelerator Program entrant
- w/o = Walkover
- r = Retired
- d = Defaulted

=== Final ===
Semifinals
1	(Czechoslovakia) **Jana Novotná** (United States) **Jim Pugh**	**6**	**6**
(Netherlands) Manon Bollegraf (Netherlands) Tom Nijssen	3	3
(United States) **Zina Garrison** (United States) **Sherwood Stewart**	4	**7^{7}**	**6**
7	(United States) Elise Burgin (Australia) Peter Doohan	**6**	6^{5}	4

Final
1	(Czechoslovakia) **Jana Novotná** (United States) **Jim Pugh**	**6**	**6**
(United States) Zina Garrison (United States) Sherwood Stewart	3	4

=== Top half ===
First round
1	(Czechoslovakia) **J Novotná** (United States) **J Pugh**	**6**	**6**
(Austria) J Wiesner (Austria) T Muster	3	4
WC	(Australia) D Balestrat (Australia) J Anderson	6^{8}	5
(South Africa) **L Gregory** (South Africa) **N Broad**	**7^{10}**	**7**
(United States) **T Phelps** (Australia) **T Woodbridge**	**6**	**6**
(United States) A Henricksson (Netherlands) M Schapers	2	4
(Australia) **M Jaggard** (Australia) **B Dyke**	**6**	**6**
5	(United States) K Adams (United States) M Davis	4	4
Alt	(Australia) L O'Neill (Australia) M Kratzmann	4	2
(United States) **R Reis** (South Africa) **S Kruger**	**6**	**6**
(New Zealand) J Richardson (New Zealand) K Evernden	2	**6**	3
(Australia) **J Byrne** (Australia) **D Macpherson**	**6**	3	**6**
(Australia) L Field (Australia) B Drewett	1	4
(Netherlands) **M Bollegraf** (Netherlands) **T Nijssen**	**6**	**6**
(Sweden) C Lindqvist (Sweden) P Lundgren	5	3
8	(Australia) **N Provis** (United States) **J Kriek**	**7**	**6**

Second round
1	(Czechoslovakia) **J Novotná** (United States) **J Pugh**	**6**	**6**
(South Africa) L Gregory (South Africa) N Broad	4	1
(United States) T Phelps (Australia) T Woodbridge	4	2
(Australia) **M Jaggard** (Australia) **B Dyke**	**6**	**6**
(United States) R Reis (South Africa) S Kruger	6^{4}	6^{5}
(Australia) **J Byrne** (Australia) **D Macpherson**	**7^{7}**	**7^{7}**
(Netherlands) **M Bollegraf** (Netherlands) **T Nijssen**	3	**7^{7}**	**6**
8	(Australia) N Provis (United States) J Kriek	**6**	6^{0}	2

Quarterfinals
1	(Czechoslovakia) **J Novotná** (United States) **J Pugh**	**6**	**6**
(Australia) M Jaggard (Australia) B Dyke	4	4
(Australia) J Byrne (Australia) D Macpherson	4	4
(Netherlands) **M Bollegraf** (Netherlands) **T Nijssen**	**6**	**6**

Semifinals
1	(Czechoslovakia) **J Novotná** (United States) **J Pugh**	**6**	**6**
(Netherlands) M Bollegraf (Netherlands) T Nijssen	3	3

=== Bottom half ===
First round
6	(Canada) **J Hetherington** (Canada) **G Connell**	**7^{7}**	**6**
WC	(Australia) W Turnbull (United Kingdom) J Lloyd	6^{4}	3
(Netherlands) B Schultz (Denmark) M Mortensen	4	4
(United States) **Z Garrison** (United States) **S Stewart**	**6**	**6**
(Belgium) S Wasserman (Portugal) J Cunha e Silva	3	4
(United States) **B Herr** (United States) **T Pawsat**	**6**	**6**
(Sweden) M Lindström (Sweden) T Svantesson	2	6^{4}
4	(United States) **P Fendick** (United States) **R Leach**	**6**	**7^{7}**
7	(United States) **E Burgin** (Australia) **P Doohan**	**6**	**7^{7}**
(New Zealand) B Cordwell (New Zealand) S Guy	4	6^{2}
(Australia) J-A Faull (Australia) J Stoltenberg	2	2
(United States) **G Magers** (United States) **K Jones**	**6**	**6**
(United States) K Horvath (United States) G Donnelly	6^{4}	6^{3}
(United States) **H Ludloff** (Argentina) **H de la Peña**	**7^{7}**	**7^{7}**
(Poland) I Kuczyńska (Czechoslovakia) C Suk	2	4
2	(Australia) **E Smylie** (Australia) **J Fitzgerald**	**6**	**6**

Second round
6	(Canada) J Hetherington (Canada) G Connell	1	2
(United States) **Z Garrison** (United States) **S Stewart**	**6**	**6**
(United States) B Herr (United States) T Pawsat	2	**6**	2
4	(United States) **P Fendick** (United States) **R Leach**	**6**	3	**6**
7	(United States) **E Burgin** (Australia) **P Doohan**	**7**	3	**6**
(United States) G Magers (United States) K Jones	5	**6**	3
(United States) H Ludloff (Argentina) H de la Peña	4	3
2	(Australia) **E Smylie** (Australia) **J Fitzgerald**	**6**	**6**

Quarterfinals
(United States) **Z Garrison** (United States) **S Stewart**	**6**	2	**6**
4	(United States) P Fendick (United States) R Leach	3	**6**	4
7	(United States) **E Burgin** (Australia) **P Doohan**	**7**	4	**10**
2	(Australia) E Smylie (Australia) J Fitzgerald	5	**6**	8

Semifinals
(United States) **Z Garrison** (United States) **S Stewart**	4	**7^{7}**	**6**
7	(United States) E Burgin (Australia) P Doohan	**6**	6^{5}	4
