= Andrea Farley =

American tennis player (born 1971)

- Full name: Andrea M. Farley
- Country (sports): United States
- Born: September 30, 1971 (age 53)
- Prize money: $49,474

Singles
- Highest ranking: No. 118 (July 3, 1989)

Grand Slam singles results
- Australian Open: 3R (1989)
- French Open: 2R (1989)
- US Open: 1R (1989, 1990)

Doubles
- Highest ranking: No. 188 (July 31, 1989)

Grand Slam doubles results
- US Open: 1R (1988)

Andrea M. Farley (born September 30, 1971) is an American former professional tennis player.

== Biography ==
Growing up in Cincinnati, Ohio, Farley won four state high school singles championships, a record for any player (male or female). She was a junior singles finalist at the 1988 French Open and was also the junior runner-up at the 1989 Australian Open.

Farley, who reached a career high ranking of 118 in the world, featured in the main draw of all grand slam tournaments except Wimbledon, although she did play there as a junior. As a qualifier at the 1989 Australian Open, she won her way through to the third round, where she was beaten in three sets by eighth seed Claudia Kohde-Kilsch. At the 1989 French Open she defeated former semi-finalist Jo Durie in the first round.

In the early 1990s she played college tennis for the University of Florida and earned All-American honors on three occasions.

When she graduated from the University of Florida in 1993 she retired from playing professional tournaments and instead continued her studies at Vanderbilt University Law School, where she earned a J.D. She now works as a corporate attorney in Atlanta.

== ITF finals ==
Legend
$25,000 tournaments
$10,000 tournaments

=== Singles: 1 (1–0) ===
Outcome	Date	Tournament	Surface	Opponent	Score
Winner	March 5, 1989	Miami, United States	Hard	(Poland) Renata Baranski	6–4, 6–1

=== Doubles: 1 (1–0) ===
Outcome	Date	Tournament	Surface	Partner	Opponents	Score
Winner	July 14, 1991	Indianapolis, United States	Hard	(United States) Caroline Kuhlman	(United States) Janna Kovacevich (Puerto Rico) Emilie Viqueira	6–1, 6–3
