= 1990 Australian Open =

- Date: 15–28 January 1990
- Edition: 78th
- Category: Grand Slam (ITF)
- Surface: Hardcourt (Rebound Ace)
- Location: Melbourne, Australia
- Venue: National Tennis Centre at Flinders Park

Champions

Men's singles
- (Czechoslovakia) Ivan Lendl

Women's singles
- (West Germany) Steffi Graf

Men's doubles
- (South Africa) Pieter Aldrich / (South Africa) Danie Visser

Women's doubles
- (Czechoslovakia) Jana Novotná / (Czechoslovakia) Helena Suková

Mixed doubles
- (Soviet Union) Natasha Zvereva / (United States) Jim Pugh

Boys' singles
- (West Germany) Dirk Dier

Girls' singles
- (Bulgaria) Magdalena Maleeva

Boys' doubles
- (Sweden) Roger Pettersson / (Sweden) Mårten Renström

Girls' doubles
- (Israel) Rona Mayer / (Israel) Limor Zaltz
- Australian Open

The 1990 Australian Open was a tennis tournament played on outdoor hard courts at Flinders Park in Melbourne in Victoria in Australia. It was the 78th edition of the Australian Open and was held from 15 through 28 January 1990.

== Seniors ==
=== Men's singles ===
(Czechoslovakia) Ivan Lendl defeated (Sweden) Stefan Edberg 4–6, 7–6^{(7–3)}, 5–2 (Edberg retired)

- It was Lendl's 8th and last career Grand Slam title and his 2nd Australian Open title.

=== Women's singles ===
(West Germany) Steffi Graf defeated (United States) Mary Joe Fernández 6–3, 6–4

- It was Graf's 9th career Grand Slam title and her 3rd Australian Open title.

=== Men's doubles ===
(South Africa) Pieter Aldrich / (South Africa) Danie Visser defeated (Canada) Grant Connell / (Canada) Glenn Michibata 6–4, 4–6, 6–1, 6–4

- It was Aldrich's 1st career Grand Slam title and his only Australian Open title. It was Visser's 1st career Grand Slam title and his 1st Australian Open title.

=== Women's doubles ===
(Czechoslovakia) Jana Novotná / (Czechoslovakia) Helena Suková defeated (United States) Patty Fendick / (United States) Mary Joe Fernández 7–6^{(7–5)}, 7–6^{(8–6)}

- It was Novotná's 6th career Grand Slam title and her 3rd Australian Open title. It was Suková's 4th career Grand Slam title and her 1st Australian Open title.

=== Mixed doubles ===
(Soviet Union) Natasha Zvereva / (United States) Jim Pugh defeated (United States) Zina Garrison / (United States) Rick Leach 4–6, 6–2, 6–3

- It was Zvereva's 2nd career Grand Slam title and her 1st Australian Open title. It was Pugh's 7th career Grand Slam title and his 5th and last Australian Open title.

== Juniors ==
=== Boys' singles ===
(West Germany) Dirk Dier defeated (India) Leander Paes 6–4, 7–6

=== Girls' singles ===
(Bulgaria) Magdalena Maleeva defeated (Australia) Louise Stacey 7–5, 6–7, 6–1

=== Boys' doubles ===
(Sweden) Roger Pettersson / (Sweden) Mårten Renström defeated (Canada) Robert Janecek / (Mexico) Ernesto Munoz de Cote 4–6, 7–6, 6–1

=== Girls' doubles ===
(Israel) Rona Mayer / (Israel) Limor Zaltz defeated (Australia) Justine Hodder / (Australia) Nicole Pratt 6–4, 6–4

== Prize money ==
Event		W	F	SF	QF	4R	3R	2R	1R
Singles	Men	A$320,000	A$160,000	A$80,000	A$40,000	A$21,000	A$12,000	A$7,500	A$4,600
Singles	Women	A$320,000	A$160,000	A$80,000	A$40,000	A$21,000	A$12,000	A$7,500	A$4,600

Preceded by 1989 US Open	Grand Slams	Succeeded by 1990 French Open
