= 1989 Australian Open =

- Date: 16–29 January 1989
- Edition: 77th
- Category: Grand Slam (ITF)
- Surface: Hardcourt (Rebound Ace)
- Location: Melbourne, Australia
- Venue: Flinders Park

Champions

Men's singles
- (Czechoslovakia) Ivan Lendl

Women's singles
- (West Germany) Steffi Graf

Men's doubles
- (United States) Rick Leach / (United States) Jim Pugh

Women's doubles
- (United States) Martina Navratilova / (United States) Pam Shriver

Mixed doubles
- (Czechoslovakia) Jana Novotná / (United States) Jim Pugh

Boys' singles
- (Sweden) Nicklas Kulti

Girls' singles
- (United States) Kim Kessaris

Boys' doubles
- (Australia) Johan Anderson / (Australia) Todd Woodbridge

Girls' doubles
- (Czechoslovakia) Andrea Strnadová / (Czechoslovakia) Eva Švíglerová
← 1988 ·	Australian Open	· 1990 →

The 1989 Australian Open was a tennis tournament played on outdoor hard courts at Flinders Park in Melbourne in Victoria in Australia. It was the 77th edition of the Australian Open and was held from 16 through 29 January 1989.

== Seniors ==
=== Men's singles ===
(Czechoslovakia) Ivan Lendl defeated (Czechoslovakia) Miloslav Mečíř 6–2, 6–2, 6–2

- It was Lendl's 7th career Grand Slam title and his 1st Australian Open title.

=== Women's singles ===
(West Germany) Steffi Graf defeated (Czechoslovakia) Helena Suková 6–4, 6–4

- It was Graf's 6th career Grand Slam title and her 2nd Australian Open title.

=== Men's doubles ===
(United States) Rick Leach / (United States) Jim Pugh defeated (Australia) Darren Cahill / (Australia) Mark Kratzmann 6–4, 6–4, 6–4

- It was Leach's 2nd career Grand Slam title and his 2nd Australian Open title. It was Pugh's 4th career Grand Slam title and his 3rd Australian Open title.

=== Women's doubles ===
(United States) Martina Navratilova / (United States) Pam Shriver defeated (United States) Patty Fendick / (Canada) Jill Hetherington 3–6, 6–3, 6–2

- It was Navratilova's 52nd career Grand Slam title and her 11th Australian Open title. It was Shriver's 21st career Grand Slam title and her 7th and last Australian Open title.

=== Mixed doubles ===
(Czechoslovakia) Jana Novotná / (United States) Jim Pugh defeated (United States) Zina Garrison / (United States) Sherwood Stewart 6–3, 6–4

- It was Novotná's 3rd career Grand Slam title and her 2nd Australian Open title. It was Pugh's 5th career Grand Slam title and his 4th Australian Open title.

== Juniors ==
=== Boys' singles ===
(Sweden) Nicklas Kulti defeated (Australia) Todd Woodbridge 6–2, 6–0

=== Girls' singles ===
(United States) Kim Kessaris defeated (United States) Andrea Farley 6–1, 6–2

- Kessaris was the first and only American junior ever to win this event.

=== Boys' doubles ===
(Australia) Johan Anderson / (Australia) Todd Woodbridge defeated (Australia) Andrew Kratzmann / (Australia) Jamie Morgan 6–4, 6–2

=== Girls' doubles ===
(Czechoslovakia) Andrea Strnadová / (Czechoslovakia) Eva Švíglerová defeated (Australia) Nicole Pratt / (Australia) Angie Woolcock 6–2, 6–0

Preceded by 1988 US Open	Grand Slams	Succeeded by 1989 French Open
