= 1986 Grand Prix (tennis) =

Tennis circuit

1986 Grand Prix circuit
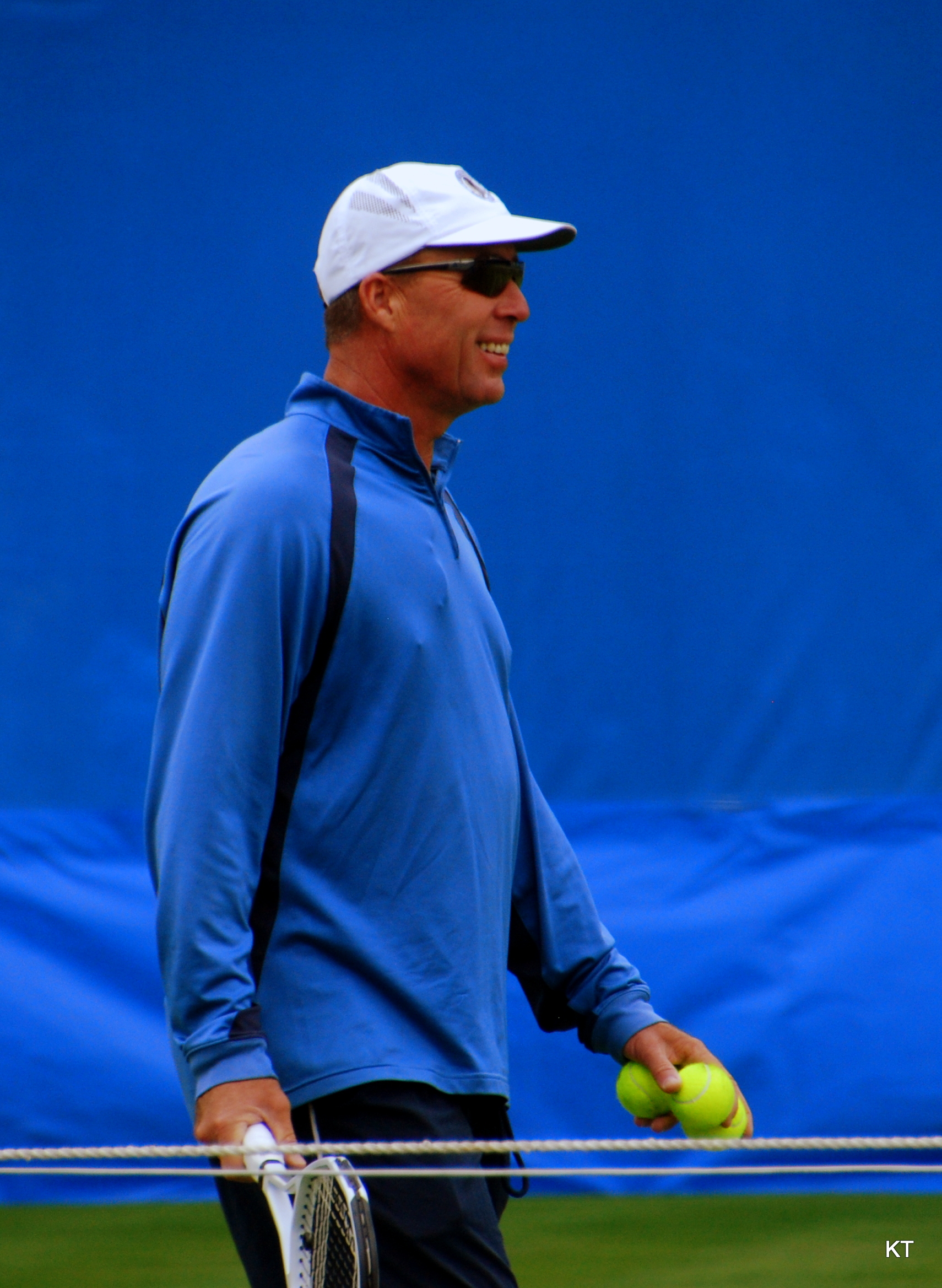
- Ivan Lendl finished the year as world No. 1 for the second time in his career. He won nine titles during the season, including two majors at the French Open and the US Open, as well as the Masters Grand Prix. He also finished runner-up at another major, the Wimbledon Championships.

Details
- Duration: 6 January 1986 – 10 December 1986
- Edition: 17th
- Tournaments: 70
- Categories: Grand Slam (4); World Championship Tennis (5); Regular Series (59); Team Events (2)

Achievements (singles)
- Most titles: (Czechoslovakia) Ivan Lendl (9)
- Most finals: (Czechoslovakia) Ivan Lendl (12)
- Prize money leader: (Czechoslovakia) Ivan Lendl ($800,000) (Note: Lendl's total ATP prize money for the year was $1,987,537. This consisted of earnings from tournaments (including WCT), circuit bonuses, play-offs and team events based on merit.)
- Points leader: (Czechoslovakia) Ivan Lendl (4,801)

Awards
- Player of the year: (Czechoslovakia) Ivan Lendl
- Most improved player of the year: (Sweden) Mikael Pernfors
- Newcomer of the year: (Sweden) Ulf Stenlund
- Comeback player of the year: Not given

The 1986 Nabisco Grand Prix was the only tennis circuit held that year. The tour consisted of 70 tournaments in 23 different countries. It incorporated three of the four grand slam tournaments, three World Championship Tennis tournaments and the Grand Prix tournaments. The season ending Masters tournament was moved from the January slot to December.

== Schedule ==
The table below shows the schedule for the 1986 Nabisco Grand Prix season.

=== Key ===
Grand Slam events
Team events
World Championship Tennis event
Year-end championships

=== January ===
Week	Tournament	Champions	Runners-up	Semifinalists	Quarterfinalists
6 Jan	Benson and Hedges Open; Auckland, New Zealand; Hard – $85,000 – 32S/16D; Singles	(Australia) Mark Woodforde; 6–4, 6–3, 3–6, 6–4	(United States) Bud Schultz	(Australia) Wally Masur (United States) Bill Scanlon	(Australia) Craig Miller (United States) Brett Dickinson (New Zealand) David Lewis (Australia) Brad Drewett
6 Jan	Benson and Hedges Open; Auckland, New Zealand; Hard – $85,000 – 32S/16D; Singles	(Australia) Broderick Dyke (Australia) Wally Masur; 6–3, 6–4	(United States) Karl Richter (United States) Rick Rudeen	(Australia) Wally Masur (United States) Bill Scanlon	(Australia) Craig Miller (United States) Brett Dickinson (New Zealand) David Lewis (Australia) Brad Drewett
6 Jan	Mazda World Doubles Championships; London, Great Britain; Year-end championships Carpet (i) – $200,000 – 8S (RR); Doubles	(Switzerland) Heinz Günthardt (Hungary) Balázs Taróczy; 6–4, 1–6, 7–6, 6–7, 6–4	(United States) Paul Annacone (South Africa) Christo van Rensburg		
27 Jan	Ebel U.S. Pro Indoor; Philadelphia, United States; Carpet (i) – $375,000 – 48S/24D; Singles – Doubles	(Czechoslovakia) Ivan Lendl w/o	(United States) Tim Mayotte	(United States) Brad Gilbert (France) Yannick Noah	(United States) Paul Annacone (Switzerland) Jakob Hlasek (United States) Kevin Curren (United States) Jimmy Connors
27 Jan	Ebel U.S. Pro Indoor; Philadelphia, United States; Carpet (i) – $375,000 – 48S/24D; Singles – Doubles	(United States) Scott Davis (United States) David Pate; 7–6, 7–6	(Sweden) Stefan Edberg (Sweden) Anders Järryd	(United States) Brad Gilbert (France) Yannick Noah	(United States) Paul Annacone (Switzerland) Jakob Hlasek (United States) Kevin Curren (United States) Jimmy Connors

=== February ===
Week	Tournament	Champions	Runners-up	Semifinalists	Quarterfinalists
3 Feb	Volvo U.S. Indoor Championships; Memphis, United States; Carpet (i) – $250,000 – 48S/24D; Singles – Doubles	(United States) Brad Gilbert; 7–5, 7–6^{(7–3)}	(Sweden) Stefan Edberg	(Sweden) Anders Järryd (Sweden) Mikael Pernfors	(United States) Jimmy Connors (United States) Paul Annacone (United States) Kevin Curren (United States) Johan Kriek
3 Feb	Volvo U.S. Indoor Championships; Memphis, United States; Carpet (i) – $250,000 – 48S/24D; Singles – Doubles	(United States) Ken Flach (United States) Robert Seguso; 6–4, 4–6, 7–6^{(7–5)}	(France) Guy Forget (Sweden) Anders Järryd	(Sweden) Anders Järryd (Sweden) Mikael Pernfors	(United States) Jimmy Connors (United States) Paul Annacone (United States) Kevin Curren (United States) Johan Kriek
3 Feb	Corel North American Indoor; Toronto, Ontario, Canada; Carpet (i) – $125,000 – 32S/16D; Singles – Doubles	(Sweden) Joakim Nyström; 6–1, 6–4	(Czechoslovakia) Milan Šrejber	(United States) Jonathan Canter (United States) Peter Fleming	(Sweden) Jonas Svensson (United States) Bob Green (Canada) Glenn Michibata (United States) Glenn Layendecker
3 Feb	Corel North American Indoor; Toronto, Ontario, Canada; Carpet (i) – $125,000 – 32S/16D; Singles – Doubles	(Sweden) Joakim Nyström (Poland) Wojciech Fibak; 6–3, 7–6	(South Africa) Christo Steyn (South Africa) Danie Visser	(United States) Jonathan Canter (United States) Peter Fleming	(Sweden) Jonas Svensson (United States) Bob Green (Canada) Glenn Michibata (United States) Glenn Layendecker
10 Feb; 17 Feb	Lipton International Players Championships; Boca West, United States; Hard – $750,000 – 128S/64D; Singles – Doubles	(Czechoslovakia) Ivan Lendl; 3–6, 6–1, 7–6^{(7–5)}, 6–4	(Sweden) Mats Wilander	(United States) Jimmy Connors (Sweden) Stefan Edberg	(Sweden) Joakim Nyström (France) Yannick Noah (Czechoslovakia) Milan Šrejber (France) Guy Forget
10 Feb; 17 Feb	Lipton International Players Championships; Boca West, United States; Hard – $750,000 – 128S/64D; Singles – Doubles	(United States) Brad Gilbert (United States) Vince Van Patten w/o	(Sweden) Stefan Edberg (Sweden) Anders Järryd	(United States) Jimmy Connors (Sweden) Stefan Edberg	(Sweden) Joakim Nyström (France) Yannick Noah (Czechoslovakia) Milan Šrejber (France) Guy Forget
24 Feb	Pilot Pen Classic; La Quinta, United States; Hard – $325,000 – 56S/28D; Singles – Doubles	(Sweden) Joakim Nyström; 6–1, 6–3, 6–2	(France) Yannick Noah	(France) Thierry Tulasne (United States) Jimmy Connors	(Sweden) Mats Wilander (Sweden) Mikael Pernfors (West Germany) Boris Becker (United States) David Pate
24 Feb	Pilot Pen Classic; La Quinta, United States; Hard – $325,000 – 56S/28D; Singles – Doubles	(United States) Peter Fleming (France) Guy Forget; 7–6, 6–2	(France) Yannick Noah (United States) Sherwood Stewart	(France) Thierry Tulasne (United States) Jimmy Connors	(Sweden) Mats Wilander (Sweden) Mikael Pernfors (West Germany) Boris Becker (United States) David Pate

=== March ===
Week	Tournament	Champions	Runners-up	Semifinalists	Quarterfinalists
3 Mar	Davis Cup by NEC; Mexico City, Mexico – clay Guayaquil, Ecuador – clay Auckland, New Zealand – hard Telford, Great Britain – carpet Belgrade, Yugoslavia – hard (i); Calcutta, India – grass Palermo, Italy – clay Brøndby, Denmark – carpet	First round winners Mexico 3–2; United States 3–2; Australia 4–1; Great Britain 4–1; Yugoslavia 3–2; Czechoslovakia 4–1; Italy 4–1; Sweden 5–0	First round losers West Germany; Ecuador; New Zealand; Spain; Soviet Union; India; Paraguay; Denmark		
10 Mar	Fila Trophy; Milan, Italy; Carpet (i) – $300,000 – 32S/16D; Singles	(Czechoslovakia) Ivan Lendl; 6–2, 6–2, 6–4	(Sweden) Joakim Nyström	(Czechoslovakia) Miloslav Mečíř (Sweden) Anders Järryd	(Switzerland) Jakob Hlasek (Spain) Sergio Casal (Israel) Amos Mansdorf (United States) Bob Green
10 Mar	Fila Trophy; Milan, Italy; Carpet (i) – $300,000 – 32S/16D; Singles	(United Kingdom) Colin Dowdeswell (South Africa) Christo Steyn; 6–3, 4–6, 6–1	(South Africa) Brian Levine (Australia) Laurie Warder	(Czechoslovakia) Miloslav Mečíř (Sweden) Anders Järryd	(Switzerland) Jakob Hlasek (Spain) Sergio Casal (Israel) Amos Mansdorf (United States) Bob Green
10 Mar	Open de Lorraine; Metz, France; Carpet (i) – $85,000 – 32S/16D	(France) Thierry Tulasne; 6–4, 6–3	(Australia) Broderick Dyke	(Netherlands) Michiel Schapers (Iran) Mansour Bahrami	(United States) Todd Nelson (United States) Mark Dickson (Sweden) Jörgen Windahl (West Germany) Ivo Werner
10 Mar	Open de Lorraine; Metz, France; Carpet (i) – $85,000 – 32S/16D	(Poland) Wojciech Fibak (France) Guy Forget; 2–6, 6–2, 6–4	(Paraguay) Francisco González (Netherlands) Michiel Schapers	(Netherlands) Michiel Schapers (Iran) Mansour Bahrami	(United States) Todd Nelson (United States) Mark Dickson (Sweden) Jörgen Windahl (West Germany) Ivo Werner
17 Mar	Paine Webber Classic; Fort Myers, United States; Hard – $250,000 – 32S/16D; Singles – Doubles	(Czechoslovakia) Ivan Lendl; 6–2, 6–0	(United States) Jimmy Connors	(Ecuador) Andrés Gómez (United States) Tim Mayotte	(United States) David Pate (United States) Johan Kriek (United States) Greg Holmes (United States) Todd Witsken
17 Mar	Paine Webber Classic; Fort Myers, United States; Hard – $250,000 – 32S/16D; Singles – Doubles	(Ecuador) Andrés Gómez (Czechoslovakia) Ivan Lendl; 7–5, 6–4	(Australia) Peter Doohan (Australia) Paul McNamee	(Ecuador) Andrés Gómez (United States) Tim Mayotte	(United States) David Pate (United States) Johan Kriek (United States) Greg Holmes (United States) Todd Witsken
17 Mar	Belgium Indoors Championships; Brussels, Belgium; Carpet (i) – $250,000 – 32S/16D; Singles – Doubles	(Sweden) Mats Wilander; 6–2, 6–3	(Australia) Broderick Dyke	(Sweden) Joakim Nyström (Czechoslovakia) Miloslav Mečíř	(United States) Jonathan Canter (United States) Kevin Curren (Sweden) Anders Järryd (France) Guy Forget
17 Mar	Belgium Indoors Championships; Brussels, Belgium; Carpet (i) – $250,000 – 32S/16D; Singles – Doubles	(West Germany) Boris Becker (Socialist Federal Republic of Yugoslavia) Slobodan Živojinović; 7–6, 7–5	(United States) Kevin Curren (Poland) Wojciech Fibak	(Sweden) Joakim Nyström (Czechoslovakia) Miloslav Mečíř	(United States) Jonathan Canter (United States) Kevin Curren (Sweden) Anders Järryd (France) Guy Forget
24 Mar	ABN World Tennis Tournament; Rotterdam, Netherlands; Carpet (i) – $250,000 – 32S/16D; Singles – Doubles	(Sweden) Joakim Nyström; 6–0, 6–3	(Sweden) Anders Järryd	(West Germany) Eric Jelen (France) Guy Forget	(Czechoslovakia) Tomáš Šmíd (Spain) Emilio Sánchez (Poland) Wojciech Fibak (Sweden) Stefan Edberg
24 Mar	ABN World Tennis Tournament; Rotterdam, Netherlands; Carpet (i) – $250,000 – 32S/16D; Singles – Doubles	(Sweden) Stefan Edberg (Socialist Federal Republic of Yugoslavia) Slobodan Živojinović; 2–6, 6–3, 6–2	(Poland) Wojciech Fibak (United States) Matt Mitchell	(West Germany) Eric Jelen (France) Guy Forget	(Czechoslovakia) Tomáš Šmíd (Spain) Emilio Sánchez (Poland) Wojciech Fibak (Sweden) Stefan Edberg
24 Mar	Volvo Tennis Chicago; Chicago, United States; Carpet (i) – $250,000 – 32S/16D	(West Germany) Boris Becker; 7–6^{(7–5)}, 6–3	(Czechoslovakia) Ivan Lendl	(United States) Scott Davis (United States) Jimmy Connors	(United States) Johan Kriek (United States) Kevin Curren (United States) Paul Annacone (Ecuador) Andrés Gómez
24 Mar	Volvo Tennis Chicago; Chicago, United States; Carpet (i) – $250,000 – 32S/16D	(United States) Ken Flach (United States) Robert Seguso; 6–0, 7–5	(South Africa) Eddie Edwards (Paraguay) Francisco González	(United States) Scott Davis (United States) Jimmy Connors	(United States) Johan Kriek (United States) Kevin Curren (United States) Paul Annacone (Ecuador) Andrés Gómez
31 Mar	WCT Atlanta Championships; Atlanta, United States; Carpet (i) – $220,000 – 32S/16D	(United States) Kevin Curren; 7–6, 7–6	(United States) Tim Wilkison	(United States) Brian Teacher (United States) David Pate	(Sweden) Mikael Pernfors (United States) Eliot Teltscher (United States) Brad Gilbert (United States) Mike Leach
31 Mar	WCT Atlanta Championships; Atlanta, United States; Carpet (i) – $220,000 – 32S/16D	(United States) Andy Kohlberg (United States) Robert Van't Hof; 6–2, 6–3	(South Africa) Christo Steyn (South Africa) Danie Visser	(United States) Brian Teacher (United States) David Pate	(Sweden) Mikael Pernfors (United States) Eliot Teltscher (United States) Brad Gilbert (United States) Mike Leach
31 Mar	Goldstar Cologne; Cologne, West Germany; Hard (i) – $100,000 – 32S/16D; Singles – Doubles	(Sweden) Jonas Svensson; 6–7, 6–2, 6–2	(Sweden) Stefan Eriksson	(Sweden) Anders Järryd (Czechoslovakia) Karel Nováček	(United States) Gary Donnelly (United States) Chip Hooper (Israel) Amos Mansdorf (Czechoslovakia) Libor Pimek
31 Mar	Goldstar Cologne; Cologne, West Germany; Hard (i) – $100,000 – 32S/16D; Singles – Doubles	(New Zealand) Kelly Evernden (United States) Chip Hooper; 6–4, 6–7, 6–3	(Sweden) Jan Gunnarsson (Sweden) Peter Lundgren	(Sweden) Anders Järryd (Czechoslovakia) Karel Nováček	(United States) Gary Donnelly (United States) Chip Hooper (Israel) Amos Mansdorf (Czechoslovakia) Libor Pimek

=== April ===
Week	Tournament	Champions	Runners-up	Semifinalists	Quarterfinalists
7 Apr	Buick WCT Finals; Dallas, United States; Carpet (i) – $500,000 – 16S; Singles	(Sweden) Anders Järryd; 6–7^{(3–7)}, 6–1, 6–1, 6–4	(West Germany) Boris Becker	(Sweden) Mats Wilander (Sweden) Stefan Edberg	(United States) Johan Kriek (Sweden) Joakim Nyström (France) Yannick Noah (United States) Paul Annacone
7 Apr	Kim Top Line Trophy Puglia; Bari, Italy; Clay – $85,000 – 32S/16D	(Sweden) Kent Carlsson; 7–5, 6–7, 7–5	(Argentina) Horacio de la Peña	(Spain) José López-Maeso (Italy) Simone Colombo	(Italy) Paolo Canè (United States) Lawson Duncan (West Germany) Wolfgang Popp (West Germany) Hans Schwaier
7 Apr	Kim Top Line Trophy Puglia; Bari, Italy; Clay – $85,000 – 32S/16D	(United States) Gary Donnelly (Czechoslovakia) Tomáš Šmíd	(Spain) Sergio Casal (Spain) Emilio Sánchez	(Spain) José López-Maeso (Italy) Simone Colombo	(Italy) Paolo Canè (United States) Lawson Duncan (West Germany) Wolfgang Popp (West Germany) Hans Schwaier
14 Apr	Nice International Open; Nice, France; Clay – $85,000 – 32S/16D; Singles – Doubles	(Spain) Emilio Sánchez; 6–1, 6–3	(Australia) Paul McNamee	(Spain) Jordi Arrese (Spain) Sergio Casal	(France) Thierry Tulasne (Romania) Florin Segărceanu (France) Tarik Benhabiles (Czechoslovakia) Marián Vajda
14 Apr	Nice International Open; Nice, France; Clay – $85,000 – 32S/16D; Singles – Doubles	(Switzerland) Jakob Hlasek (Czechoslovakia) Pavel Složil; 6–3, 3–6, 11–9	(United States) Gary Donnelly (United Kingdom) Colin Dowdeswell	(Spain) Jordi Arrese (Spain) Sergio Casal	(France) Thierry Tulasne (Romania) Florin Segărceanu (France) Tarik Benhabiles (Czechoslovakia) Marián Vajda
21 Apr	Volvo Monte Carlo Open; Roquebrune-Cap-Martin, France; Clay – $325,000 – 48S/24D	(Sweden) Joakim Nyström; 6–3, 6–2	(France) Yannick Noah	(Sweden) Mats Wilander (Sweden) Stefan Edberg	(Haiti) Ronald Agénor (Spain) Fernando Luna (Switzerland) Jakob Hlasek (Ecuador) Andrés Gómez
21 Apr	Volvo Monte Carlo Open; Roquebrune-Cap-Martin, France; Clay – $325,000 – 48S/24D	(France) Guy Forget (France) Yannick Noah; 6–4, 3–6, 6–4	(Sweden) Joakim Nyström (Sweden) Mats Wilander	(Sweden) Mats Wilander (Sweden) Stefan Edberg	(Haiti) Ronald Agénor (Spain) Fernando Luna (Switzerland) Jakob Hlasek (Ecuador) Andrés Gómez
28 Apr	U.S. Open Clay Court Championships; Indianapolis, United States; Clay – $300,000 – 56S/28D; Singles – Doubles	(Ecuador) Andrés Gómez; 6–4, 7–6^{(7–1)}	(France) Thierry Tulasne	(United States) Jimmy Arias (Argentina) Martín Jaite	(Argentina) Eduardo Bengoechea (United States) Aaron Krickstein (Switzerland) Jakob Hlasek (Sweden) Mikael Pernfors
28 Apr	U.S. Open Clay Court Championships; Indianapolis, United States; Clay – $300,000 – 56S/28D; Singles – Doubles	(Chile) Hans Gildemeister (Ecuador) Andrés Gómez; 6–4, 6–3	(Australia) John Fitzgerald (United States) Sherwood Stewart	(United States) Jimmy Arias (Argentina) Martín Jaite	(Argentina) Eduardo Bengoechea (United States) Aaron Krickstein (Switzerland) Jakob Hlasek (Sweden) Mikael Pernfors
28 Apr	Madrid Open; Madrid, Spain; Clay – $85,000 – 32S/16D; Singles – Doubles	(Sweden) Joakim Nyström; 6–1, 6–1	(Sweden) Kent Carlsson	(West Germany) Andreas Maurer (Sweden) Anders Järryd	(Paraguay) Víctor Pecci (Brazil) Luiz Mattar (West Germany) Tore Meinecke (Argentina) Marcelo Ingaramo
28 Apr	Madrid Open; Madrid, Spain; Clay – $85,000 – 32S/16D; Singles – Doubles	(Sweden) Anders Järryd (Sweden) Joakim Nyström; 6–2, 6–2	(Spain) Jesus Colas-Abad (Spain) David de Miguel-Lapiedra	(West Germany) Andreas Maurer (Sweden) Anders Järryd	(Paraguay) Víctor Pecci (Brazil) Luiz Mattar (West Germany) Tore Meinecke (Argentina) Marcelo Ingaramo

=== May ===
Week	Tournament	Champions	Runners-up	Semifinalists	Quarterfinalists
5 May	Shearson Lehman Brothers; Tournament of Champions; New York, United States; Clay – $500,000 – 64S/32D; Singles – Doubles	(France) Yannick Noah; 7–6^{(7–3)}, 6–0	(Argentina) Guillermo Vilas	(Czechoslovakia) Ivan Lendl (Argentina) Martín Jaite	(France) Thierry Tulasne (Peru) Pablo Arraya (Sweden) Joakim Nyström (West Germany) Boris Becker
5 May	Shearson Lehman Brothers; Tournament of Champions; New York, United States; Clay – $500,000 – 64S/32D; Singles – Doubles	(Chile) Hans Gildemeister (Ecuador) Andrés Gómez; 7–6, 7–6	(West Germany) Boris Becker (Socialist Federal Republic of Yugoslavia) Slobodan Živojinović	(Czechoslovakia) Ivan Lendl (Argentina) Martín Jaite	(France) Thierry Tulasne (Peru) Pablo Arraya (Sweden) Joakim Nyström (West Germany) Boris Becker
5 May	Bavarian Open; Munich, West Germany; Clay – $100,000 – 32S/16D; Singles – Doubles	(Spain) Emilio Sánchez; 6–1, 6–3	(West Germany) Ricki Osterthun	(Sweden) Jonas Svensson (United States) Eliot Teltscher	(Czechoslovakia) Miloslav Mečíř (Sweden) Kent Carlsson (West Germany) Eric Jelen (Austria) Thomas Muster
5 May	Bavarian Open; Munich, West Germany; Clay – $100,000 – 32S/16D; Singles – Doubles	(Spain) Sergio Casal (Spain) Emilio Sánchez; 6–3, 4–6, 6–3	(Australia) Broderick Dyke (Australia) Wally Masur	(Sweden) Jonas Svensson (United States) Eliot Teltscher	(Czechoslovakia) Miloslav Mečíř (Sweden) Kent Carlsson (West Germany) Eric Jelen (Austria) Thomas Muster
12 May	Italian Open; Rome, Italy; Clay – $350,000 – 64S/32D	(Czechoslovakia) Ivan Lendl; 7–5, 4–6, 6–1, 6–1	(Spain) Emilio Sánchez	(France) Yannick Noah (Sweden) Mats Wilander	(France) Henri Leconte (Uruguay) Diego Pérez (West Germany) Boris Becker (Czechoslovakia) Libor Pimek
12 May	Italian Open; Rome, Italy; Clay – $350,000 – 64S/32D	(France) Guy Forget (France) Yannick Noah; 7–6, 6–2	(Australia) Mark Edmondson (United States) Sherwood Stewart	(France) Yannick Noah (Sweden) Mats Wilander	(France) Henri Leconte (Uruguay) Diego Pérez (West Germany) Boris Becker (Czechoslovakia) Libor Pimek
19 May	Torneo Internazionale Città di Firenze; Florence, Italy; Clay – $85,000 – 32S/16D	(Ecuador) Andrés Gómez; 6–3, 6–4	(Sweden) Henrik Sundström	(Switzerland) Claudio Mezzadri (Spain) Emilio Sánchez	(Uruguay) Diego Pérez (Italy) Francesco Cancellotti (Austria) Thomas Muster (Argentina) Horacio de la Peña
19 May	Torneo Internazionale Città di Firenze; Florence, Italy; Clay – $85,000 – 32S/16D	(Spain) Sergio Casal (Spain) Emilio Sánchez; 6–4, 7–6	(United States) Mike De Palmer (United States) Gary Donnelly	(Switzerland) Claudio Mezzadri (Spain) Emilio Sánchez	(Uruguay) Diego Pérez (Italy) Francesco Cancellotti (Austria) Thomas Muster (Argentina) Horacio de la Peña
19 May	World Team Cup; Düsseldorf, West Germany	France; 2–1	Sweden		
26 May; 2 Jun	French Open; Paris, France; Grand Slam; Clay – $1,125,000 – 128S/64D/ 64XD; Singles – Doubles – Mixed doubles	(Czechoslovakia) Ivan Lendl; 6–3, 6–2, 6–4	(Sweden) Mikael Pernfors	(United States) Johan Kriek (France) Henri Leconte	(Ecuador) Andrés Gómez (Argentina) Guillermo Vilas (West Germany) Boris Becker (Soviet Union) Andrei Chesnokov
26 May; 2 Jun	French Open; Paris, France; Grand Slam; Clay – $1,125,000 – 128S/64D/ 64XD; Singles – Doubles – Mixed doubles	(Australia) John Fitzgerald (Czechoslovakia) Tomáš Šmíd; 6–3, 4–6, 6–3, 6–7^{(4–7)}, 14–12	(Sweden) Stefan Edberg (Sweden) Anders Järryd	(United States) Johan Kriek (France) Henri Leconte	(Ecuador) Andrés Gómez (Argentina) Guillermo Vilas (West Germany) Boris Becker (Soviet Union) Andrei Chesnokov
26 May; 2 Jun	French Open; Paris, France; Grand Slam; Clay – $1,125,000 – 128S/64D/ 64XD; Singles – Doubles – Mixed doubles	(United States) Kathy Jordan (United States) Ken Flach; 3–6, 7–6^{(7–3)}, 6–3	(South Africa) Rosalyn Fairbank Nideffer (Australia) Mark Edmondson	(United States) Johan Kriek (France) Henri Leconte	(Ecuador) Andrés Gómez (Argentina) Guillermo Vilas (West Germany) Boris Becker (Soviet Union) Andrei Chesnokov

=== June ===
Week	Tournament	Champions	Runners-up	Semifinalists	Quarterfinalists
9 Jun	Stella Artois Grass Court Championships; London, Great Britain; Grass – $200,000– 64S/32D; Singles – Doubles	(United States) Tim Mayotte; 6–4, 2–1 ret.	(United States) Jimmy Connors	(United States) Robert Seguso (Sweden) Stefan Edberg	(United States) Paul Annacone (India) Ramesh Krishnan (United States) Tim Wilkison (West Germany) Boris Becker
9 Jun	Stella Artois Grass Court Championships; London, Great Britain; Grass – $200,000– 64S/32D; Singles – Doubles	(United States) Kevin Curren (France) Guy Forget; 3–6, 6–3, 16–14	(Australia) Darren Cahill (Australia) Mark Kratzmann	(United States) Robert Seguso (Sweden) Stefan Edberg	(United States) Paul Annacone (India) Ramesh Krishnan (United States) Tim Wilkison (West Germany) Boris Becker
9 Jun	Master Bologna; Bologna, Italy; Clay – $85,000 – 32S/16D	(Argentina) Martín Jaite; 6–2, 4–6, 6–4	(Italy) Paolo Canè	(Sweden) Kent Carlsson (Mexico) Francisco Maciel	(Argentina) Horacio de la Peña (Italy) Simone Colombo (Uruguay) Diego Pérez (Spain) Sergio Casal
9 Jun	Master Bologna; Bologna, Italy; Clay – $85,000 – 32S/16D	(Italy) Paolo Canè (Italy) Simone Colombo; 6–1, 6–2	(Italy) Claudio Panatta (United States) Blaine Willenborg	(Sweden) Kent Carlsson (Mexico) Francisco Maciel	(Argentina) Horacio de la Peña (Italy) Simone Colombo (Uruguay) Diego Pérez (Spain) Sergio Casal
16 Jun	Bristol Trophy; Bristol, Great Britain; Grass – $100,000– 48S/16D; Singles – Doubles	(India) Vijay Amritraj; 7–6^{(8–6)}, 1–6, 8–6	(France) Henri Leconte	(United States) Bud Schultz (Australia) Mark Woodforde	(Netherlands) Michiel Schapers (United Kingdom) Jeremy Bates (United States) Bob Green (United States) Tim Wilkison
16 Jun	Bristol Trophy; Bristol, Great Britain; Grass – $100,000– 48S/16D; Singles – Doubles	(South Africa) Christo Steyn (South Africa) Danie Visser; 6–7, 7–6, 12–10	(Australia) Mark Edmondson (Australia) Wally Masur	(United States) Bud Schultz (Australia) Mark Woodforde	(Netherlands) Michiel Schapers (United Kingdom) Jeremy Bates (United States) Bob Green (United States) Tim Wilkison
16 Jun	Athens International; Athens, Greece; Clay – $100,000 – 32S/16D; Singles – Doubles	(Sweden) Henrik Sundström; 6–0, 7–5	(Mexico) Francisco Maciel	(Spain) Juan Avendaño (Peru) Pablo Arraya	(Italy) Claudio Panatta (Spain) Fernando Luna (Socialist Federal Republic of Yugoslavia) Bruno Orešar (Chile) Pedro Rebolledo
16 Jun	Athens International; Athens, Greece; Clay – $100,000 – 32S/16D; Singles – Doubles	(Belgium) Libor Pimek (United States) Blaine Willenborg; 5–7, 6–4, 6–2	(Peru) Carlos di Laura (Italy) Claudio Panatta	(Spain) Juan Avendaño (Peru) Pablo Arraya	(Italy) Claudio Panatta (Spain) Fernando Luna (Socialist Federal Republic of Yugoslavia) Bruno Orešar (Chile) Pedro Rebolledo
23 Jun	Wimbledon Championships; London, Great Britain; Grand Slam; Grass – $1,306,690 – 128S/64D/64XD; Singles – Doubles – Mixed doubles	(West Germany) Boris Becker; 6–4, 6–3, 7–5	(Czechoslovakia) Ivan Lendl	(Socialist Federal Republic of Yugoslavia) Slobodan Živojinović (France) Henri Leconte	(United States) Tim Mayotte (India) Ramesh Krishnan (Czechoslovakia) Miloslav Mečíř (Australia) Pat Cash
23 Jun	Wimbledon Championships; London, Great Britain; Grand Slam; Grass – $1,306,690 – 128S/64D/64XD; Singles – Doubles – Mixed doubles	(Sweden) Joakim Nyström (Sweden) Mats Wilander; 7–6^{(7–4)}, 6–3, 6–3	(United States) Gary Donnelly (United States) Peter Fleming	(Socialist Federal Republic of Yugoslavia) Slobodan Živojinović (France) Henri Leconte	(United States) Tim Mayotte (India) Ramesh Krishnan (Czechoslovakia) Miloslav Mečíř (Australia) Pat Cash
23 Jun	Wimbledon Championships; London, Great Britain; Grand Slam; Grass – $1,306,690 – 128S/64D/64XD; Singles – Doubles – Mixed doubles	(United States) Kathy Jordan (United States) Ken Flach; 6–3, 7–6^{(9–7)}	(United States) Martina Navratilova (Switzerland) Heinz Günthardt	(Socialist Federal Republic of Yugoslavia) Slobodan Živojinović (France) Henri Leconte	(United States) Tim Mayotte (India) Ramesh Krishnan (Czechoslovakia) Miloslav Mečíř (Australia) Pat Cash

=== July ===
Week	Tournament	Champions	Runners-up	Semifinalists	Quarterfinalists
7 Jul	Nabisco Grand Prix Passing Shot; Bordeaux, France; Clay – $125,000 – 32S/16D; Singles – Doubles	(Italy) Paolo Canè; 6–4, 1–6, 7–5	(Sweden) Kent Carlsson	(Sweden) Ulf Stenlund (Haiti) Ronald Agénor	(France) Thierry Champion (Uruguay) Diego Pérez (Czechoslovakia) Libor Pimek (France) Thierry Tulasne
7 Jul	Nabisco Grand Prix Passing Shot; Bordeaux, France; Clay – $125,000 – 32S/16D; Singles – Doubles	(Spain) Jordi Arrese (Spain) David de Miguel-Lapiedra; 7–5, 6–4	(Haiti) Ronald Agénor (Iran) Mansour Bahrami	(Sweden) Ulf Stenlund (Haiti) Ronald Agénor	(France) Thierry Champion (Uruguay) Diego Pérez (Czechoslovakia) Libor Pimek (France) Thierry Tulasne
7 Jul	RADO Swiss Open $200,000 – Gstaad, Switzerland	(Sweden) Stefan Edberg; 7–5, 4–6, 6–1, 4–6, 6–2	(Switzerland) Roland Stadler	(Sweden) Jan Gunnarsson (Spain) Emilio Sánchez	(West Germany) Damir Keretić (Sweden) Mikael Pernfors (Switzerland) Jakob Hlasek (Czechoslovakia) Tomáš Šmíd
7 Jul	RADO Swiss Open $200,000 – Gstaad, Switzerland	(Spain) Sergio Casal (Spain) Emilio Sánchez; 6–3, 3–6, 6–3	(Sweden) Stefan Edberg (Sweden) Joakim Nyström	(Sweden) Jan Gunnarsson (Spain) Emilio Sánchez	(West Germany) Damir Keretić (Sweden) Mikael Pernfors (Switzerland) Jakob Hlasek (Czechoslovakia) Tomáš Šmíd
7 Jul	Volvo Tennis Hall of Fame Championships; Newport, United States; Grass – $125,000 – 32S/16D	(United States) Bill Scanlon; 7–5, 6–4	(United States) Tim Wilkison	(South Africa) Danie Visser (South Africa) Eddie Edwards	(Chile) Ricardo Acuña (United States) Glenn Layendecker (United States) Marc Flur (United States) Val Wilder
7 Jul	Volvo Tennis Hall of Fame Championships; Newport, United States; Grass – $125,000 – 32S/16D	(India) Vijay Amritraj (United States) Tim Wilkison; 4–6, 7–5, 7–6	(South Africa) Eddie Edwards (Paraguay) Francisco González	(South Africa) Danie Visser (South Africa) Eddie Edwards	(Chile) Ricardo Acuña (United States) Glenn Layendecker (United States) Marc Flur (United States) Val Wilder
14 July	Davis Cup by NEC; Mexico City, Mexico – clay Wimbledon, England – grass Sarajevo, Yugoslavia – hard (i); Båstad, Sweden – clay	Quarterfinals winners United States 4–1; Australia 4–1; Czechoslovakia 5–0; Sweden 5–0	Quarterfinals losers Mexico; Great Britain; Yugoslavia; Italy		
21 Jul	U.S. Pro Tennis Championships; Boston, United States; Clay – $220,000 – 56S/28D; Singles – Doubles	(Ecuador) Andrés Gómez; 7–5, 6–4	(Argentina) Martín Jaite	(Sweden) Kent Carlsson (Argentina) Horacio de la Peña	(United States) Aaron Krickstein (Argentina) Guillermo Vilas (United States) Jimmy Arias (France) Thierry Tulasne
21 Jul	U.S. Pro Tennis Championships; Boston, United States; Clay – $220,000 – 56S/28D; Singles – Doubles	(Chile) Hans Gildemeister (Ecuador) Andrés Gómez; 4–6, 7–5, 6–0	(United States) Dan Cassidy (United States) Mel Purcell	(Sweden) Kent Carlsson (Argentina) Horacio de la Peña	(United States) Aaron Krickstein (Argentina) Guillermo Vilas (United States) Jimmy Arias (France) Thierry Tulasne
21 Jul	Volvo Tennis Open; Livingston, New Jersey, United States; Hard – $85,000 – 32S/16D; Singles – Doubles	(United States) Brad Gilbert; 6–2, 6–2	(United States) Mike Leach	(Australia) Wally Masur (South Africa) Christo van Rensburg	(United States) Greg Holmes (United States) Jay Lapidus (India) Ramesh Krishnan (United States) Sammy Giammalva
21 Jul	Volvo Tennis Open; Livingston, New Jersey, United States; Hard – $85,000 – 32S/16D; Singles – Doubles	(United States) Bob Green (Australia) Wally Masur; 5–7, 6–4, 6–4	(United States) Sammy Giammalva, Jr. (United States) Greg Holmes	(Australia) Wally Masur (South Africa) Christo van Rensburg	(United States) Greg Holmes (United States) Jay Lapidus (India) Ramesh Krishnan (United States) Sammy Giammalva
21 Jul	Swedish Open; Båstad, Sweden; Clay – $125,000 – 32S/16D; Singles – Doubles	(Spain) Emilio Sánchez; 7–6^{(7–5)}, 4–6, 6–4	(Sweden) Mats Wilander	(Czechoslovakia) Miloslav Mečíř (Sweden) Stefan Edberg	(West Germany) Eric Jelen (Sweden) Mikael Pernfors (Italy) Paolo Canè (Sweden) Ulf Stenlund
21 Jul	Swedish Open; Båstad, Sweden; Clay – $125,000 – 32S/16D; Singles – Doubles	(Spain) Sergio Casal (Spain) Emilio Sánchez; 6–4, 6–3	(South Africa) Craig Campbell (United States) Joey Rive	(Czechoslovakia) Miloslav Mečíř (Sweden) Stefan Edberg	(West Germany) Eric Jelen (Sweden) Mikael Pernfors (Italy) Paolo Canè (Sweden) Ulf Stenlund
28 Jul	D.C. National Bank Classic; Washington, United States; Clay – $220,000 – 56S/28D; Singles – Doubles	(Czechoslovakia) Karel Nováček; 6–1, 7–6^{(7–4)}	(France) Thierry Tulasne	(Ecuador) Andrés Gómez (United States) Jimmy Arias	(United States) Aaron Krickstein (Sweden) Kent Carlsson (Argentina) Martín Jaite (Sweden) Johan Carlsson
28 Jul	D.C. National Bank Classic; Washington, United States; Clay – $220,000 – 56S/28D; Singles – Doubles	(Chile) Hans Gildemeister (Ecuador) Andrés Gómez; 6–3, 7–5	(Brazil) Ricardo Acioly (Brazil) César Kist	(Ecuador) Andrés Gómez (United States) Jimmy Arias	(United States) Aaron Krickstein (Sweden) Kent Carlsson (Argentina) Martín Jaite (Sweden) Johan Carlsson
28 Jul	Dutch Open; Hilversum, Netherlands; Clay – $100,000 – 32S/16D; Singles – Doubles	(Austria) Thomas Muster; 6–1, 6–3, 6–3	(Switzerland) Jakob Hlasek	(Netherlands) Menno Oosting (Spain) Emilio Sánchez	(Czechoslovakia) Miloslav Mečíř (West Germany) Andreas Maurer (Italy) Paolo Canè (Czechoslovakia) Marián Vajda
28 Jul	Dutch Open; Hilversum, Netherlands; Clay – $100,000 – 32S/16D; Singles – Doubles	(Czechoslovakia) Miloslav Mečíř (Czechoslovakia) Tomáš Šmíd; 6–4, 6–2	(Netherlands) Tom Nijssen (Netherlands) Johan Vekemans	(Netherlands) Menno Oosting (Spain) Emilio Sánchez	(Czechoslovakia) Miloslav Mečíř (West Germany) Andreas Maurer (Italy) Paolo Canè (Czechoslovakia) Marián Vajda

=== August ===
Week	Tournament	Champions	Runners-up	Semifinalists	Quarterfinalists
4 Aug	Volvo International; Stratton Mountain, United States; Hard – $250,000 – 64S/32D; Singles – Doubles	(Czechoslovakia) Ivan Lendl; 6–4, 7–6^{(7–0)}	(West Germany) Boris Becker	(United States) Jimmy Connors (United States) John McEnroe	(United States) Brad Gilbert (United States) Robert Seguso (United States) Andre Agassi (Canada) Martin Laurendeau
4 Aug	Volvo International; Stratton Mountain, United States; Hard – $250,000 – 64S/32D; Singles – Doubles	(United States) Peter Fleming (United States) John McEnroe; 6–3, 3–6, 6–3	(United States) Paul Annacone (South Africa) Christo van Rensburg	(United States) Jimmy Connors (United States) John McEnroe	(United States) Brad Gilbert (United States) Robert Seguso (United States) Andre Agassi (Canada) Martin Laurendeau
4 Aug	Head Cup; Kitzbühel, Austria; Clay – $150,000 – 64S/32D	(Czechoslovakia) Miloslav Mečíř; 6–4, 4–6, 6–1, 2–6, 6–3	(Ecuador) Andrés Gómez	(Sweden) Joakim Nyström (Spain) Emilio Sánchez	(Argentina) Horacio de la Peña (Austria) Horst Skoff (Argentina) Martín Jaite (Czechoslovakia) Tomáš Šmíd
4 Aug	Head Cup; Kitzbühel, Austria; Clay – $150,000 – 64S/32D	(Switzerland) Heinz Günthardt (Czechoslovakia) Tomáš Šmíd; 4–6, 6–3, 7–6	(Chile) Hans Gildemeister (Ecuador) Andrés Gómez	(Sweden) Joakim Nyström (Spain) Emilio Sánchez	(Argentina) Horacio de la Peña (Austria) Horst Skoff (Argentina) Martín Jaite (Czechoslovakia) Tomáš Šmíd
11 Aug	Player's Canadian Open; Toronto, Ontario, Canada; Hard – $300,000 – 56S/28D; Singles – Doubles	(West Germany) Boris Becker; 6–4, 3–6, 6–3	(Sweden) Stefan Edberg	(South Africa) Christo Steyn (United States) Jonathan Canter	(United States) Kevin Curren (United States) Robert Seguso (United States) Marcel Freeman (United States) Bud Schultz
11 Aug	Player's Canadian Open; Toronto, Ontario, Canada; Hard – $300,000 – 56S/28D; Singles – Doubles	(United States) Chip Hooper (United States) Mike Leach; 6–7, 6–3, 6–3	(West Germany) Boris Becker (Socialist Federal Republic of Yugoslavia) Slobodan Živojinović	(South Africa) Christo Steyn (United States) Jonathan Canter	(United States) Kevin Curren (United States) Robert Seguso (United States) Marcel Freeman (United States) Bud Schultz
11 Aug	Campionati Internazionali della Valle D'Aosta; Saint-Vincent, Italy; Clay – $85,000 – 32S/16D	(Italy) Simone Colombo; 2–6, 6–3, 7–6^{(7–2)}	(Australia) Paul McNamee	(Argentina) Guillermo Pérez Roldán (Czechoslovakia) Libor Pimek	(Austria) Alex Antonitsch (Argentina) Marcelo Ingaramo (United States) Lawson Duncan (Iran) Mansour Bahrami
11 Aug	Campionati Internazionali della Valle D'Aosta; Saint-Vincent, Italy; Clay – $85,000 – 32S/16D	(Czechoslovakia) Libor Pimek (Czechoslovakia) Pavel Složil; 6–3, 6–3	(United States) Bud Cox (Australia) Michael Fancutt	(Argentina) Guillermo Pérez Roldán (Czechoslovakia) Libor Pimek	(Austria) Alex Antonitsch (Argentina) Marcelo Ingaramo (United States) Lawson Duncan (Iran) Mansour Bahrami
18 Aug	Cincinnati Open; Mason, United States; Hard – $300,000 – 64S/32D	(Sweden) Mats Wilander; 6–4, 6–1	(United States) Jimmy Connors	(Sweden) Stefan Edberg (Sweden) Mikael Pernfors	(Spain) Emilio Sánchez (United States) Tim Wilkison (United States) Kevin Curren (Sweden) Kent Carlsson
18 Aug	Cincinnati Open; Mason, United States; Hard – $300,000 – 64S/32D	(Australia) Mark Kratzmann (Australia) Kim Warwick; 6–3, 6–4	(South Africa) Christo Steyn (South Africa) Danie Visser	(Sweden) Stefan Edberg (Sweden) Mikael Pernfors	(Spain) Emilio Sánchez (United States) Tim Wilkison (United States) Kevin Curren (Sweden) Kent Carlsson
26 Aug	US Open; New York City, United States; Grand Slam; Hard – $1,400,000 – 128S/64D/32XD; Singles – Doubles – Mixed doubles	(Czechoslovakia) Ivan Lendl; 6–4, 6–2, 6–0	(Czechoslovakia) Miloslav Mečíř	(Sweden) Stefan Edberg (West Germany) Boris Becker	(France) Henri Leconte (United States) Tim Wilkison (Czechoslovakia) Milan Šrejber (Sweden) Joakim Nyström
26 Aug	US Open; New York City, United States; Grand Slam; Hard – $1,400,000 – 128S/64D/32XD; Singles – Doubles – Mixed doubles	(Ecuador) Andrés Gómez (Socialist Federal Republic of Yugoslavia) Slobodan Živojinović; 4–6, 6–3, 6–3, 4–6, 6–3	(Sweden) Joakim Nyström (Sweden) Mats Wilander	(Sweden) Stefan Edberg (West Germany) Boris Becker	(France) Henri Leconte (United States) Tim Wilkison (Czechoslovakia) Milan Šrejber (Sweden) Joakim Nyström
26 Aug	US Open; New York City, United States; Grand Slam; Hard – $1,400,000 – 128S/64D/32XD; Singles – Doubles – Mixed doubles	(Italy) Raffaella Reggi (Spain) Sergio Casal; 6–4, 6–4	(United States) Martina Navratilova (United States) Peter Fleming	(Sweden) Stefan Edberg (West Germany) Boris Becker	(France) Henri Leconte (United States) Tim Wilkison (Czechoslovakia) Milan Šrejber (Sweden) Joakim Nyström

=== September ===
Week	Tournament	Champions	Runners-up	Semifinalists	Quarterfinalists
8 Sep	Mercedes Cup; Stuttgart, West Germany; Clay – $162,500 – 48S/24D; Singles – Doubles	(Argentina) Martín Jaite; 7–5, 6–2	(Sweden) Jonas Svensson	(Ecuador) Andrés Gómez (Sweden) Ulf Stenlund	(Spain) David de Miguel-Lapiedra (Austria) Horst Skoff (Argentina) Guillermo Vilas (Sweden) Mikael Pernfors
8 Sep	Mercedes Cup; Stuttgart, West Germany; Clay – $162,500 – 48S/24D; Singles – Doubles	(Chile) Hans Gildemeister (Ecuador) Andrés Gómez; 6–4, 6–3	(Iran) Mansour Bahrami (Uruguay) Diego Pérez	(Ecuador) Andrés Gómez (Sweden) Ulf Stenlund	(Spain) David de Miguel-Lapiedra (Austria) Horst Skoff (Argentina) Guillermo Vilas (Sweden) Mikael Pernfors
8 Sep	Martini Open; Geneva, Switzerland $200,000 – Clay – 32S/16D; Singles – Doubles	(France) Henri Leconte; 7–5, 6–3	(France) Thierry Tulasne	(Argentina) Eduardo Bengoechea (Argentina) Christian Miniussi	(Canada) Martin Wostenholme (Spain) Juan Avendaño (Spain) Fernando Luna (Spain) Jorge Bardou
8 Sep	Martini Open; Geneva, Switzerland $200,000 – Clay – 32S/16D; Singles – Doubles	(West Germany) Andreas Maurer (Sweden) Jörgen Windahl; 6–4, 3–6, 6–4	(Argentina) Gustavo Luza (Argentina) Gustavo Tiberti	(Argentina) Eduardo Bengoechea (Argentina) Christian Miniussi	(Canada) Martin Wostenholme (Spain) Juan Avendaño (Spain) Fernando Luna (Spain) Jorge Bardou
15 Sep	Volvo Tennis Los Angeles; Los Angeles, United States; Hard – $250,000 – 32S/16D; Singles – Doubles	(United States) John McEnroe; 6–2, 6–3	(Sweden) Stefan Edberg	(Sweden) Peter Lundgren (United States) Brad Gilbert	(United States) Derrick Rostagno (Peru) Jaime Yzaga (United States) David Pate (Australia) Pat Cash
15 Sep	Volvo Tennis Los Angeles; Los Angeles, United States; Hard – $250,000 – 32S/16D; Singles – Doubles	(Sweden) Stefan Edberg (Sweden) Anders Järryd; 3–6, 7–5, 7–6^{(9–7)}	(United States) Peter Fleming (United States) John McEnroe	(Sweden) Peter Lundgren (United States) Brad Gilbert	(United States) Derrick Rostagno (Peru) Jaime Yzaga (United States) David Pate (Australia) Pat Cash
15 Sep	Ebel German Open; Hamburg, West Germany $315,000 – Clay – 56S/28D; Singles – Doubles	(France) Henri Leconte; 6–2, 5–7, 6–4, 6–2	(Czechoslovakia) Miloslav Mečíř	(Spain) Emilio Sánchez (Sweden) Kent Carlsson	(United States) Mel Purcell (Austria) Thomas Muster (Switzerland) Jakob Hlasek (Sweden) Henrik Sundström
15 Sep	Ebel German Open; Hamburg, West Germany $315,000 – Clay – 56S/28D; Singles – Doubles	(Spain) Sergio Casal (Spain) Emilio Sánchez; 6–4, 6–1	(West Germany) Boris Becker (West Germany) Eric Jelen	(Spain) Emilio Sánchez (Sweden) Kent Carlsson	(United States) Mel Purcell (Austria) Thomas Muster (Switzerland) Jakob Hlasek (Sweden) Henrik Sundström
22 Sep	Transamerica Open; San Francisco, United States; Carpet (i) – $220,000 – 32S/16D; Singles – Doubles	(United States) John McEnroe; 7–6^{(8–6)}, 6–3	(United States) Jimmy Connors	(Sweden) Stefan Edberg (Sweden) Anders Järryd	(United States) Jim Grabb (United States) John Sadri (United States) David Pate (Sweden) Peter Lundgren
22 Sep	Transamerica Open; San Francisco, United States; Carpet (i) – $220,000 – 32S/16D; Singles – Doubles	(United States) Peter Fleming (United States) John McEnroe; 6–4, 7–6^{(7–2)}	(United States) Mike De Palmer (United States) Gary Donnelly	(Sweden) Stefan Edberg (Sweden) Anders Järryd	(United States) Jim Grabb (United States) John Sadri (United States) David Pate (Sweden) Peter Lundgren
22 Sep	Torneo Godó Marlboro; Barcelona, Spain; Clay – $220,000 – 64S/32D	(Sweden) Kent Carlsson; 6–2, 6–2, 6–0	(West Germany) Andreas Maurer	(Austria) Horst Skoff (Czechoslovakia) Tomáš Šmíd	(Czechoslovakia) Milan Šrejber (Spain) David de Miguel-Lapiedra (France) Guy Forget (Uruguay) Diego Pérez
22 Sep	Torneo Godó Marlboro; Barcelona, Spain; Clay – $220,000 – 64S/32D	(Sweden) Jan Gunnarsson (Sweden) Joakim Nyström; 6–3, 6–4	(Peru) Carlos di Laura (Italy) Claudio Panatta	(Austria) Horst Skoff (Czechoslovakia) Tomáš Šmíd	(Czechoslovakia) Milan Šrejber (Spain) David de Miguel-Lapiedra (France) Guy Forget (Uruguay) Diego Pérez
29 Sep	Campionati Internazionali di Sicilia; Palermo, Sicily, Italy; Clay – $100,000 – 32S/16D	(Sweden) Ulf Stenlund; 6–2, 6–3	(Peru) Pablo Arraya	(Italy) Simone Colombo (Switzerland) Claudio Mezzadri	(United States) Mark Dickson (United States) Jimmy Brown (Haiti) Ronald Agénor (Italy) Corrado Aprili
29 Sep	Campionati Internazionali di Sicilia; Palermo, Sicily, Italy; Clay – $100,000 – 32S/16D	(Italy) Paolo Canè (Italy) Simone Colombo; 7–5, 6–3	(Switzerland) Claudio Mezzadri (Italy) Gianni Ocleppo	(Italy) Simone Colombo (Switzerland) Claudio Mezzadri	(United States) Mark Dickson (United States) Jimmy Brown (Haiti) Ronald Agénor (Italy) Corrado Aprili
29 Sep	Davis Cup by NEC: Semifinals; Brisbane – Australia – grass Prague – Czechoslovakia – clay	Semifinal Winners; Australia 3–1; Sweden 4–1	Semifinal losers United States; Czechoslovakia		

=== October ===
Week	Tournament	Champions	Runners-up	Semifinalists	Quarterfinalists
6 Oct	Riklis Israel Tennis Center Classic; Tel Aviv, Israel; Hard – $80,000 – 32S/16D; Singles – Doubles	(United States) Brad Gilbert; 7–5, 6–2	(United States) Aaron Krickstein	(South Africa) Christo Steyn (Israel) Amos Mansdorf	(Israel) Gilad Bloom (West Germany) Michael Westphal (Canada) Andrew Sznajder (Sweden) Peter Carlsson
6 Oct	Riklis Israel Tennis Center Classic; Tel Aviv, Israel; Hard – $80,000 – 32S/16D; Singles – Doubles	(United States) John Letts (Sweden) Peter Lundgren; 6–3, 3–6, 6–3	(South Africa) Christo Steyn (South Africa) Danie Visser	(South Africa) Christo Steyn (Israel) Amos Mansdorf	(Israel) Gilad Bloom (West Germany) Michael Westphal (Canada) Andrew Sznajder (Sweden) Peter Carlsson
6 Oct	Nabisco Grand Prix Olympia de Toulouse; Toulouse, France; Hard (i) – $150,000 – 32S/16D; Singles – Doubles	(France) Guy Forget; 4–6, 6–3, 6–2	(Sweden) Jan Gunnarsson	(Uruguay) Diego Pérez (Czechoslovakia) Milan Šrejber	(Czechoslovakia) Miloslav Mečíř (Netherlands) Michiel Schapers (Switzerland) Jakob Hlasek (France) Thierry Tulasne
6 Oct	Nabisco Grand Prix Olympia de Toulouse; Toulouse, France; Hard (i) – $150,000 – 32S/16D; Singles – Doubles	(Czechoslovakia) Miloslav Mečíř (Czechoslovakia) Tomáš Šmíd; 6–2, 3–6, 6–4	(Switzerland) Jakob Hlasek (Czechoslovakia) Pavel Složil	(Uruguay) Diego Pérez (Czechoslovakia) Milan Šrejber	(Czechoslovakia) Miloslav Mečíř (Netherlands) Michiel Schapers (Switzerland) Jakob Hlasek (France) Thierry Tulasne
6 Oct	WCT Scottsdale Open; Scottsdale, Arizona, United States; Hard – $220,000 – 32S/16D; Singles – Doubles	(United States) John McEnroe; 6–3, 3–6, 6–2	(United States) Kevin Curren	(United States) David Pate (United States) Todd Witsken	(United States) Glenn Layendecker (United States) Jim Grabb (United States) Marty Davis (United States) Sammy Giammalva
6 Oct	WCT Scottsdale Open; Scottsdale, Arizona, United States; Hard – $220,000 – 32S/16D; Singles – Doubles	(Mexico) Leonardo Lavalle (United States) Mike Leach; 7–6, 6–4	(United States) Scott Davis (United States) David Pate	(United States) David Pate (United States) Todd Witsken	(United States) Glenn Layendecker (United States) Jim Grabb (United States) Marty Davis (United States) Sammy Giammalva
13 Oct	Swan Premium Open; Sydney, Australia; Hard (i) – $275,000 – 32S/16D; Singles – Doubles	(West Germany) Boris Becker; 3–6, 7–6^{(7–2)}, 6–2, 6–0	(Czechoslovakia) Ivan Lendl	(Australia) Pat Cash (United States) Glenn Layendecker	(Australia) Wally Masur (United States) Cary Stansbury (United States) Marcel Freeman (Australia) Broderick Dyke
13 Oct	Swan Premium Open; Sydney, Australia; Hard (i) – $275,000 – 32S/16D; Singles – Doubles	(West Germany) Boris Becker (Australia) John Fitzgerald; 6–4, 7–6	(Australia) Peter McNamara (Australia) Paul McNamee	(Australia) Pat Cash (United States) Glenn Layendecker	(Australia) Wally Masur (United States) Cary Stansbury (United States) Marcel Freeman (Australia) Broderick Dyke
13 Oct	Ebel Swiss Indoors; Basel, Switzerland; Hard (i) – $175,000 – 32S/16D	(Sweden) Stefan Edberg; 7–6^{(7–5)}, 6–2, 6–7^{(7–9)}, 7–6^{(7–5)}	(France) Yannick Noah	(United States) Brad Gilbert (Czechoslovakia) Tomáš Šmíd	(Sweden) Stefan Eriksson (South Africa) Gary Muller (South Africa) Danie Visser (United States) Aaron Krickstein
13 Oct	Ebel Swiss Indoors; Basel, Switzerland; Hard (i) – $175,000 – 32S/16D	(France) Guy Forget (France) Yannick Noah; 7–6, 6–4	(Sweden) Jan Gunnarsson (Czechoslovakia) Tomáš Šmíd	(United States) Brad Gilbert (Czechoslovakia) Tomáš Šmíd	(Sweden) Stefan Eriksson (South Africa) Gary Muller (South Africa) Danie Visser (United States) Aaron Krickstein
13 Oct	Japan and Asian Open Tennis Championships; Tokyo, Japan; Hard – $125,000 – 64S/32S	(India) Ramesh Krishnan; 6–3, 6–1	(Sweden) Johan Carlsson	(United States) Kelly Jones (Peru) Jaime Yzaga	(United States) David Pate (United States) Jonathan Canter (United States) Mike de Palmer (United States) Paul Chamberlin
13 Oct	Japan and Asian Open Tennis Championships; Tokyo, Japan; Hard – $125,000 – 64S/32S	(United States) Matt Anger (United States) Ken Flach; 6–2, 6–3	(United States) Jimmy Arias (United States) Greg Holmes	(United States) Kelly Jones (Peru) Jaime Yzaga	(United States) David Pate (United States) Jonathan Canter (United States) Mike de Palmer (United States) Paul Chamberlin
20 Oct	Seiko Super Tennis; Tokyo, Japan; Carpet (i) – $300,000 – 32S/16D; Singles – Doubles	(West Germany) Boris Becker; 7–6^{(7–5)}, 6–1	(Sweden) Stefan Edberg	(Czechoslovakia) Ivan Lendl (United States) Jimmy Connors	(United States) Scott Davis (United States) David Pate (West Germany) Eric Jelen (United States) Paul Annacone
20 Oct	Seiko Super Tennis; Tokyo, Japan; Carpet (i) – $300,000 – 32S/16D; Singles – Doubles	(United States) Mike De Palmer (United States) Gary Donnelly; 6–3, 7–5	(Ecuador) Andrés Gómez (Czechoslovakia) Ivan Lendl	(Czechoslovakia) Ivan Lendl (United States) Jimmy Connors	(United States) Scott Davis (United States) David Pate (West Germany) Eric Jelen (United States) Paul Annacone
20 Oct	CA-TennisTrophy; Vienna, Austria; Hard (i) – $125,000 – 32S/16D; Singles – Doubles	(United States) Brad Gilbert; 3–6, 6–3, 7–5, 6–0	(Czechoslovakia) Karel Nováček	(Sweden) Jonas Svensson (Sweden) Jan Gunnarsson	(United States) Richard Matuszewski (West Germany) Ricki Osterthun (Netherlands) Michiel Schapers (West Germany) Michael Westphal
20 Oct	CA-TennisTrophy; Vienna, Austria; Hard (i) – $125,000 – 32S/16D; Singles – Doubles	(Brazil) Ricardo Acioly (Poland) Wojciech Fibak; Walkover	(United States) Brad Gilbert (Socialist Federal Republic of Yugoslavia) Slobodan Živojinović	(Sweden) Jonas Svensson (Sweden) Jan Gunnarsson	(United States) Richard Matuszewski (West Germany) Ricki Osterthun (Netherlands) Michiel Schapers (West Germany) Michael Westphal
27 Oct	Open de Paris; Paris, France; Carpet (i) – $500,000 – 32S/16D; Singles – Doubles	(West Germany) Boris Becker; 6–4, 6–3, 7–6^{(7–3)}	(Spain) Sergio Casal	(France) Henri Leconte (United States) Tim Mayotte	(Sweden) Jonas Svensson (Sweden) Mikael Pernfors (United States) John McEnroe (France) Yannick Noah
27 Oct	Open de Paris; Paris, France; Carpet (i) – $500,000 – 32S/16D; Singles – Doubles	(United States) Peter Fleming (United States) John McEnroe; 6–3, 6–2	(Iran) Mansour Bahrami (Uruguay) Diego Pérez	(France) Henri Leconte (United States) Tim Mayotte	(Sweden) Jonas Svensson (Sweden) Mikael Pernfors (United States) John McEnroe (France) Yannick Noah
27 Oct	Seiko Super Tennis Hong Kong; Hong Kong, Hong Kong; Hard – $200,000 – 32S/16D	(India) Ramesh Krishnan; 7–6^{(9–7)}, 6–0, 7–5	(Ecuador) Andrés Gómez	(Australia) Pat Cash (United States) Aaron Krickstein	(United States) Jimmy Connors (United States) Jonathan Canter (Soviet Union) Andrei Chesnokov (United States) Scott Davis
27 Oct	Seiko Super Tennis Hong Kong; Hong Kong, Hong Kong; Hard – $200,000 – 32S/16D	(United States) Mike De Palmer (United States) Gary Donnelly; 7–6, 6–7, 7–5	(Australia) Pat Cash (Australia) Mark Kratzmann	(Australia) Pat Cash (United States) Aaron Krickstein	(United States) Jimmy Connors (United States) Jonathan Canter (Soviet Union) Andrei Chesnokov (United States) Scott Davis

=== November ===
Week	Tournament	Champions	Runners-up	Semifinalists	Quarterfinalists
3 Nov	Stockholm Open; Stockholm, Sweden; Hard (i) – $350,000 – 56S/28D; Singles – Doubles	(Sweden) Stefan Edberg; 6–2, 6–1, 6–1	(Sweden) Mats Wilander	(France) Henri Leconte (France) Guy Forget	(United States) Richard Matuszewski (United States) Tim Mayotte (Sweden) Kent Carlsson (United States) Gary Donnelly
3 Nov	Stockholm Open; Stockholm, Sweden; Hard (i) – $350,000 – 56S/28D; Singles – Doubles	(United States) Sherwood Stewart (Australia) Kim Warwick; 6–4, 6–4	(Australia) Pat Cash (Socialist Federal Republic of Yugoslavia) Slobodan Živojinović	(France) Henri Leconte (France) Guy Forget	(United States) Richard Matuszewski (United States) Tim Mayotte (Sweden) Kent Carlsson (United States) Gary Donnelly
10 Nov	Benson and Hedges Championships; London, Great Britain; Carpet (i) – $286,000 – 32S/16D	(France) Yannick Noah; 6–2, 6–3, 6–7^{(12–14)}, 4–6, 7–5	(Sweden) Jonas Svensson	(United States) Kevin Curren (Czechoslovakia) Libor Pimek	(United States) Johan Kriek (Australia) Pat Cash (United States) David Pate (Switzerland) Jakob Hlasek
10 Nov	Benson and Hedges Championships; London, Great Britain; Carpet (i) – $286,000 – 32S/16D	(United States) Peter Fleming (United States) John McEnroe; 3–6, 7–6, 6–2	(United States) Sherwood Stewart (Australia) Kim Warwick	(United States) Kevin Curren (Czechoslovakia) Libor Pimek	(United States) Johan Kriek (Australia) Pat Cash (United States) David Pate (Switzerland) Jakob Hlasek
10 Nov	Copa Banco Galicia; Buenos Aires, Argentina; Clay – $85,000 – 32S/16D; Singles – Doubles	(United States) Jay Berger; 6–3, 6–3	(Argentina) Franco Davín	(Argentina) Roberto Argüello (Argentina) Guillermo Pérez Roldán	(Argentina) Alejandro Ganzábal (Spain) José López-Maeso (Mexico) Francisco Maciel (West Germany) Carl-Uwe Steeb
10 Nov	Copa Banco Galicia; Buenos Aires, Argentina; Clay – $85,000 – 32S/16D; Singles – Doubles	(France) Loïc Courteau (Austria) Horst Skoff; 3–6, 6–4, 6–3	(Argentina) Gustavo Luza (Argentina) Gustavo Tiberti	(Argentina) Roberto Argüello (Argentina) Guillermo Pérez Roldán	(Argentina) Alejandro Ganzábal (Spain) José López-Maeso (Mexico) Francisco Maciel (West Germany) Carl-Uwe Steeb
17 Nov	Altech Open; Johannesburg, South Africa; Hard (i) – $300,000 – 32S/16D; Singles – Doubles	(Israel) Amos Mansdorf; 6–3, 3–6, 6–2, 7–5	(United States) Matt Anger	(South Africa) Eddie Edwards (United States) Johan Kriek	(Ecuador) Andrés Gómez (Australia) Broderick Dyke (South Africa) Danie Visser (West Germany) Michael Westphal
17 Nov	Altech Open; Johannesburg, South Africa; Hard (i) – $300,000 – 32S/16D; Singles – Doubles	(United States) Mike De Palmer (South Africa) Christo van Rensburg; 6–2, 3–6, 7–6^{(7–4)}	(Ecuador) Andrés Gómez (United States) Sherwood Stewart	(South Africa) Eddie Edwards (United States) Johan Kriek	(Ecuador) Andrés Gómez (Australia) Broderick Dyke (South Africa) Danie Visser (West Germany) Michael Westphal
17 Nov	WCT Houston Shootout; Houston United States; Carpet (i) – $220,000 – 32S/16D	(Socialist Federal Republic of Yugoslavia) Slobodan Živojinović; 6–1, 4–6, 6–3	(United States) Scott Davis	(United States) Eliot Teltscher (United States) Derrick Rostagno	(United States) Jimmy Connors (United States) Brad Pearce (United States) Bill Scanlon (United States) Aaron Krickstein
17 Nov	WCT Houston Shootout; Houston United States; Carpet (i) – $220,000 – 32S/16D	(Chile) Ricardo Acuña (United States) Brad Pearce; 6–4, 7–5	(United States) Chip Hooper (United States) Mike Leach	(United States) Eliot Teltscher (United States) Derrick Rostagno	(United States) Jimmy Connors (United States) Brad Pearce (United States) Bill Scanlon (United States) Aaron Krickstein
24 Nov	Sul America Open; Itaparica, Brazil; Hard – $125,000 – 32S/16D	(Ecuador) Andrés Gómez; 4–6, 6–4, 6–4	(France) Jean-Philippe Fleurian	(Brazil) Ivan Kley (Mexico) Francisco Maciel	(Czechoslovakia) Marian Vajda (Uruguay) Diego Pérez (United States) Mark Dickson (Brazil) Joao Soares
24 Nov	Sul America Open; Itaparica, Brazil; Hard – $125,000 – 32S/16D	(United States) Chip Hooper (United States) Mike Leach; 7–5, 6–3	(France) Loïc Courteau (France) Guy Forget	(Brazil) Ivan Kley (Mexico) Francisco Maciel	(Czechoslovakia) Marian Vajda (Uruguay) Diego Pérez (United States) Mark Dickson (Brazil) Joao Soares

=== December ===
Week	Tournament	Champions	Runners-up	Semifinalists	Quarterfinalists
3 Dec	Nabisco Masters (singles); New York City, United States; Carpet (i) – $500,000 – 8S (RR); Singles	(Czechoslovakia) Ivan Lendl; 6–4, 6–4, 6–4	(West Germany) Boris Becker	(Sweden) Mats Wilander (Sweden) Stefan Edberg	Round robin losers (France) Yannick Noah (Ecuador) Andrés Gómez (Sweden) Joakim Nyström (France) Henri Leconte
10 Dec	Nabisco Masters (doubles); London, Great Britain; Carpet (i) – $200,000 – 8D (RR); Doubles	(Sweden) Stefan Edberg (Sweden) Anders Järryd; 6–3, 7–6^{(7–2)}, 6–3	(France) Guy Forget (France) Yannick Noah	(United States) De Palmer / (United States) Donnelly (Australia) Fitzgerald / (Czechoslovakia) Šmíd	Round robin losers (South Africa) Steyn / (South Africa) Visser (Chile) Gildemeister / (Ecuador) Gómez (Spain) Casal / (Spain) Sánchez (Sweden) Nyström / (Sweden) Wilander
25 Dec	Davis Cup by NEC: Final; Melbourne, Australia; Grass	Australia; 3–2	Sweden		

== Points system ==
The tournaments of the 1986 Grand Prix circuit were divided into eighteen point categories. The highest points were allocated to the Grand Slam tournaments; French Open, the Wimbledon Championships and the US Open. For Super Series tournaments, the Grand Prix points shall be increased by one category for each additional 16 places in the draw up to a maximum increase of two additional categories. The maximum increase for Regular Series tournaments shall be one category. The singles points allocation is as follows:

	Grand Slam	2 week tournament	Tournament of Champions	$495,000+	$465,000+	$435,000+	$405,000+	$375,000+	$345,000+	$315,000+	$285,000+	$279,000+	$231,000+	$202,000+	$174,000+	$145,000+	$117,000+	$99,900+
Category	1	2	3	4	5	6	7	8	9	10	11	12	13	14	15	16	17	18
Winner	700	550	450	400	375	350	325	300	275	250	225	220	200	175	150	125	100	85
Runner-up	500	350	298	280	263	245	227	210	192	175	157	151	140	122	104	87	70	59
Semifinalist	350	200	180	160	150	140	130	120	110	100	90	88	80	70	60	50	40	34
Quarterfinalist	200	100	90	80	75	70	65	60	55	50	45	44	40	35	30	25	20	17
Last 16	100	50	45	40	37	35	32	30	27	25	22	21	20	17	14	12	10	8
Last 32	50	25	21	19	18	17	16	15	13	12	11	10	10	9	7	6	5	4
Last 64	25	12																

== Top tournaments ranked by Grand Prix points & prize money ==
Tournament	Prize money	Category
The three Grand Slam tournaments		1
Lipton Championships, Boca West (2 week tournament)	$750,000	2
Forest Hills Tournament of Champions	$500,000	3
Paris Open	$500,000 (32 draw)	4
Nabisco Masters	$500,000	
WCT Finals	$500,000	
Philadelphia	$375,000 (48 draw)	7
Italian Open	$350,000 (64 draw)	7
Stockholm Open	$350,000 (56 draw)	8
La Quinta	$325,000 (56 draw)	9
Monte Carlo Open	$325,000 (48 draw)	9
German Open	$315,000 (56 draw)	9
Cincinnati Open	$300,000 (64 draw)	9

== ATP rankings ==
As of 1 January 1986
Rk	Name
1	Ivan Lendl (TCH)
2	John McEnroe (USA)
3	Mats Wilander (SWE)
4	Jimmy Connors (USA)
5	Stefan Edberg (SWE)
6	Boris Becker (FRG)
7	Yannick Noah (FRA)
8	Anders Järryd (SWE)
9	Miloslav Mečíř (TCH)
10	Kevin Curren (USA)
11	Joakim Nyström (SWE)
12	Tim Mayotte (USA)
13	Paul Annacone (USA)
14	Johan Kriek (USA)
15	Andrés Gómez (ECU)
16	Henri Leconte (FRA)
17	Scott Davis (USA)
18	Brad Gilbert (USA)
19	Tomáš Šmíd (TCH)
20	Martín Jaite (ARG)

Year-end rankings 1986 (29 December 1986)
Rk	Name	Nation	Points	High	Low	Change
1	Ivan Lendl	TCH				=
2	Boris Becker	FRG				▲ +4
3	Mats Wilander	SWE				=
4	Yannick Noah	FRA				▲ +3
5	Stefan Edberg	SWE				=
6	Henri Leconte	FRA				▲ +10
7	Joakim Nyström	SWE				▲ +4
8	Jimmy Connors	USA				▼ –4
9	Miloslav Mečíř	TCH				=
10	Andrés Gómez	ECU				▲ +5
11	Brad Gilbert	USA				▲ +7
12	Mikael Pernfors	SWE				▲ +153
13	Kent Carlsson	SWE				▲ +37
14	John McEnroe	USA				▼ –12
15	Tim Mayotte	USA				▼ –3
16	Emilio Sánchez	ESP				▲ +48
17	Martín Jaite	ARG				▲ +3
18	Kevin Curren	USA				▼ –8
19	Anders Järryd	SWE				▼ –11
20	Thierry Tulasne	FRA				▲ +1

== List of tournament winners ==
The list of winners and number of singles titles won, alphabetically by last name:

- (India) Vijay Amritraj (1) Bristol
- (West Germany) Boris Becker (6) Chicago, Wimbledon, Toronto, Sydney Indoor, Tokyo Indoor, Bercy
- (United States) Jay Berger (1) Buenos Aires
- (Italy) Paolo Canè (1) Bordeaux
- (Sweden) Kent Carlsson (2) Bari, Barcelona
- (Italy) Simone Colombo (1) St. Vincent
- (United States) Kevin Curren (1) Atlanta
- (Sweden) Stefan Edberg (3) Gstaad, Basel, Stockholm
- (France) Guy Forget (1) Toulouse
- (United States) Brad Gilbert (4) Memphis, Livingston, Tel Aviv, Vienna
- (Ecuador) Andrés Gómez (4) Indianapolis, Florence, Boston, Itaparica
- (Argentina) Martín Jaite (2) Bologna, Stuttgart Outdoor
- (Sweden) Anders Järryd (1) Dallas
- (India) Ramesh Krishnan (2) Tokyo Outdoor, Hong Kong
- (France) Henri Leconte (2) Geneva, Hamburg
- (Czechoslovakia) Ivan Lendl (10) Masters, Philadelphia, Boca West, Milan, French Open, Fort Myers, Rome, Stratton Mountain, US Open, Masters
- (Israel) Amos Mansdorf (1) Johannesburg
- (United States) Tim Mayotte (1) Queen's Club
- (United States) John McEnroe (3) Los Angeles, San Francisco, Scottsdale
- (Czechoslovakia) Miloslav Mečíř (1) Kitzbühel
- (Austria) Thomas Muster (1) Hilversum
- (France) Yannick Noah (2) Forest Hills, Wembley
- (Czechoslovakia) Karel Nováček (1) Washington, D.C.
- (Sweden) Joakim Nyström (5) Toronto Indoor, La Quinta, Rotterdam, Monte Carlo, Madrid
- (Spain) Emilio Sánchez (3) Nice, Munich, Båstad
- (United States) Bill Scanlon (1) Newport
- (Sweden) Ulf Stenlund (1) Palermo
- (Sweden) Henrik Sundström (1) Athens
- (Sweden) Jonas Svensson (1) Cologne
- (France) Thierry Tulasne (1) Metz
- (Sweden) Mats Wilander (2) Brussels, Cincinnati
- (Australia) Mark Woodforde (1) Auckland
- (Socialist Federal Republic of Yugoslavia) Slobodan Živojinović (1) Houston

The following players won their first title in 1986:

- (United States) Jay Berger Buenos Aires
- (Italy) Paolo Canè Bordeaux
- (Sweden) Kent Carlsson Bari
- (Italy) Simone Colombo St. Vincent
- (France) Guy Forget Toulouse
- (Israel) Amos Mansdorf Johannesburg
- (Austria) Thomas Muster Hilversum
- (Czechoslovakia) Karel Nováček Washington, D.C.
- (Spain) Emilio Sánchez Nice
- (Sweden) Ulf Stenlund Palermo
- (Sweden) Jonas Svensson Cologne
- (Australia) Mark Woodforde Auckland
- (Socialist Federal Republic of Yugoslavia) Slobodan Živojinović Houston

== See also ==
- 1986 Virginia Slims World Championship Series
