= 1986 Grand Prix German Open – Doubles =

Doubles
- 1986 Grand Prix German Open

Final
- Champions: (Spain) Sergio Casal (Spain) Emilio Sánchez
- Runners-up: (West Germany) Boris Becker (West Germany) Eric Jelen
- Score: 6–4, 6–1

Events
Singles	Doubles
← 1985 ·	Hamburg European Open	· 1987 →

Hans Gildemeister and Andrés Gómez were the defending champions, but lost in the second round to Ronnie Båthman and Michiel Schapers.

Sergio Casal and Emilio Sánchez won the title by defeating Boris Becker and Eric Jelen 6–4, 6–1 in the final.

== Seeds ==
The first four seeds received a bye to the second round.

1. (Chile) Hans Gildemeister / (Ecuador) Andrés Gómez (second round)
2. (Spain) Sergio Casal / (Spain) Emilio Sánchez (champions)
3. (Sweden) Jan Gunnarsson / (Sweden) Joakim Nyström (second round)
4. (Switzerland) Jakob Hlasek / (Czechoslovakia) Pavel Složil (quarterfinals)
5. (Czechoslovakia) Miloslav Mečíř / (Czechoslovakia) Tomáš Šmíd (semifinals)
6. (Brazil) Cássio Motta / (United States) Blaine Willenborg (quarterfinals)
7. (n/a)
8. (United States) Charles Cox / (United States) Jon Levine (first round)

== Draw ==
=== Key ===
- Q = Qualifier
- WC = Wild card
- LL = Lucky loser
- Alt = Alternate
- SE = Special exempt
- PR = Protected ranking
- ITF = ITF entry
- JE = Junior exempt
- w/o = Walkover
- r = Retired
- d = Defaulted
- SR = Special ranking

=== Finals ===
Semifinals
(Sweden) Ronnie Båthman (Netherlands) Michiel Schapers	2	4
WC	(West Germany) Boris Becker (West Germany) Eric Jelen	6	6
5	(Czechoslovakia) Miloslav Mečíř (Czechoslovakia) Tomáš Šmíd	3	4
2	(Spain) Sergio Casal (Spain) Emilio Sánchez	6	6

Final
WC	(West Germany) Boris Becker (West Germany) Eric Jelen	4	1
2	(Spain) Sergio Casal (Spain) Emilio Sánchez	6	6

=== Top half ===
First round
(Sweden) R Båthman (Netherlands) M Schapers	6	6
(Sweden) J Carlsson (Sweden) J Svensson	1	2
(South Africa) C Campbell (South Africa) B Moir	6	6
(Haiti) R Agénor (Uruguay) D Pérez	1	2
(Iran) M Bahrami (France) T Tulasne	6	4	6
8	(United States) C Cox (United States) J Levine	4	6	1
WC	(West Germany) B Becker (West Germany) E Jelen	6	6
WC	(West Germany) C Saceanu (West Germany) M Westphal	4	3
(United States) D Cassidy (United States) M Purcell	6	6
(Czechoslovakia) L Pimek (Czechoslovakia) M Šrejber	3	3
(West Germany) W Popp (West Germany) H Rittersbacher	2	4
6	(Brazil) C Motta (United States) B Willenborg	6	6

Second round
1	(Chile) H Gildemeister (Ecuador) A Gómez	3	6
(Sweden) R Båthman (Netherlands) M Schapers	6	7
(South Africa) C Campbell (South Africa) B Moir	4	3
(Iran) M Bahrami (France) T Tulasne	6	6
3	(Sweden) J Gunnarsson (Sweden) J Nyström	6	1
WC	(West Germany) B Becker (West Germany) E Jelen	7	6
(United States) D Cassidy (United States) M Purcell	5	2
6	(Brazil) C Motta (United States) B Willenborg	7	6

Quarterfinals
(Sweden) R Båthman (Netherlands) M Schapers	7	6
(Iran) M Bahrami (France) T Tulasne	6	3
WC	(West Germany) B Becker (West Germany) E Jelen	4	7	6
6	(Brazil) C Motta (United States) B Willenborg	6	5	3

Semifinals
(Sweden) R Båthman (Netherlands) M Schapers	2	4
WC	(West Germany) B Becker (West Germany) E Jelen	6	6

=== Bottom half ===
First round
5	(Czechoslovakia) M Mečíř (Czechoslovakia) T Šmíd	7	6
WC	(West Germany) D Keretić (West Germany) CU Steeb	5	1
(Sweden) S Simonsson (Sweden) M Tideman	6	2	6
(West Germany) T Meinecke (West Germany) R Osterthun	3	6	7
(Austria) T Muster (Socialist Federal Republic of Yugoslavia) M Ostoja	2	1
(Brazil) N Aerts (Brazil) L Mattar	6	6
LL	(Sweden) K Carlsson (Sweden) U Stenlund	6	6	4
(Argentina) A Ganzábal (Argentina) C Miniussi	7	4	6
(Brazil) J Soares (Sweden) S Svensson	4	2
(France) G Forget (West Germany) A Maurer	6	6
(Chile) R Acuña (Chile) B Prajoux	7	4	4
(Spain) J Clavet (Spain) J Colás	6	6	6

Second round
5	(Czechoslovakia) M Mečíř (Czechoslovakia) T Šmíd	6	6
(West Germany) T Meinecke (West Germany) R Osterthun	3	0
(Brazil) N Aerts (Brazil) L Mattar	4	4
4	(Switzerland) J Hlasek (Czechoslovakia) P Složil	6	6
(Argentina) A Ganzábal (Argentina) C Miniussi	6	6
(France) G Forget (West Germany) A Maurer	4	3
(Spain) J Clavet (Spain) J Colás	4	5
2	(Spain) S Casal (Spain) E Sánchez	6	7

Quarterfinals
5	(Czechoslovakia) M Mečíř (Czechoslovakia) T Šmíd	6	7
4	(Switzerland) J Hlasek (Czechoslovakia) P Složil	1	5
(Argentina) A Ganzábal (Argentina) C Miniussi	3	2
2	(Spain) S Casal (Spain) E Sánchez	6	6

Semifinals
5	(Czechoslovakia) M Mečíř (Czechoslovakia) T Šmíd	3	4
2	(Spain) S Casal (Spain) E Sánchez	6	6
