= 1986 Stockholm Open – Doubles =

Doubles
- 1986 Stockholm Open

Final
- Champions: (United States) Sherwood Stewart (Australia) Kim Warwick
- Runners-up: (Australia) Pat Cash (Socialist Federal Republic of Yugoslavia) Slobodan Živojinović
- Score: 6–4, 6–4

Details
- Draw: 28
- Seeds: 8

Events
Singles	Doubles
- Stockholm Open

Guy Forget and Andrés Gómez were the defending champions, but Gómez did not participate this year. Forget partnered Kevin Curren, losing in the semifinals.

Sherwood Stewart and Kim Warwick won the title, defeating Pat Cash and Slobodan Živojinović 6–4, 6–4 in the final.

== Seeds ==
1. (United States) Kevin Curren / (France) Guy Forget (semifinals)
2. (United States) Mike De Palmer / (United States) Gary Donnelly (second round)
3. (Spain) Sergio Casal / (Switzerland) Jakob Hlasek (quarterfinals)
4. (United States) Sherwood Stewart / (Australia) Kim Warwick (champions)
5. (Australia) Mark Kratzmann / (Australia) Wally Masur (first round)
6. (Sweden) Hans Simonsson / (Sweden) Mats Wilander (first round)
7. (Sweden) Stefan Edberg / (France) Henri Leconte (quarterfinals)
8. (United States) Andy Kohlberg / (Mexico) Leonardo Lavalle (semifinals)

== Draw ==
Key

- Q = Qualifier
- WC = Wild card
- LL = Lucky loser
- Alt = Alternate
- ITF = ITF entry
- PR = Protected ranking
- SR = Special ranking
- SE = Special exempt
- JE = Junior exempt
- JR = Junior Accelerator Programme entrant
- CO = College Accelerator Programme entrant
- NG = Next Gen Accelerator Program entrant
- w/o = Walkover
- r = Retired
- d = Defaulted

=== Finals ===
Semifinals
1	(United States) Kevin Curren (France) Guy Forget	6	5
(Australia) Pat Cash (Socialist Federal Republic of Yugoslavia) Slobodan Živojinović	7	7
4	(United States) Sherwood Stewart (Australia) Kim Warwick	6	7
8	(United States) Andy Kohlberg (Mexico) Leonardo Lavalle	2	5

Final
(Australia) Pat Cash (Socialist Federal Republic of Yugoslavia) Slobodan Živojinović	4	4
4	(United States) Sherwood Stewart (Australia) Kim Warwick	6	6

=== Top half ===
First round
(Czechoslovakia) J Navrátil (West Germany) W Popp	5	7	7
(United States) T Nelson (United States) B Schultz	7	6	6
(Sweden) S Eriksson (Sweden) S Svensson	2	4
(Sweden) R Båthman (Netherlands) M Schapers	6	6
(Sweden) P Carlsson (Sweden) M Tideman	2	4
7	(Sweden) S Edberg (France) H Leconte	6	6
WC	(United States) H Pfister (Sweden) J Svensson	6	7
(United Kingdom) J Bates (Israel) A Mansdorf	4	6
(Australia) P Cash (Socialist Federal Republic of Yugoslavia) S Živojinović	6	6
(West Germany) A Maurer (Sweden) J Windahl	3	3
(Denmark) M Mortensen (United States) T Wilkinson	6	6
6	(Sweden) H Simonsson (Sweden) M Wilander	2	3

Second round
1	(United States) K Curren (France) G Forget	6	6
(Czechoslovakia) J Navrátil (West Germany) W Popp	3	4
(Sweden) R Båthman (Netherlands) M Schapers	4	2
7	(Sweden) S Edberg (France) H Leconte	6	6
3	(Spain) S Casal (Switzerland) J Hlasek	4	7	6
WC	(United States) H Pfister (Sweden) J Svensson	6	6	2
(Australia) P Cash (Socialist Federal Republic of Yugoslavia) S Živojinović	w/o
(Denmark) M Mortensen (United States) T Wilkinson

Quarterfinals
1	(United States) K Curren (France) G Forget	7	6	6
7	(Sweden) S Edberg (France) H Leconte	6	7	4
3	(Spain) S Casal (Switzerland) J Hlasek	4	4
(Australia) P Cash (Socialist Federal Republic of Yugoslavia) S Živojinović	6	6

Semifinals
1	(United States) K Curren (France) G Forget	6	5
(Australia) P Cash (Socialist Federal Republic of Yugoslavia) S Živojinović	7	7

=== Bottom half ===
First round
5	(Australia) M Kratzmann (Australia) W Masur	4	6	5
(United States) K Jones (United States) T Warneke	6	2	7
(Brazil) R Acioly (United States) R Matuszewski	6	6	6
(United States) M Anger (United States) B Testerman	4	7	1
(Sweden) J Gunnarsson (Sweden) M Pernfors	6	6
WC	(Sweden) M Gustafsson (Sweden) H Holm	3	2
8	(United States) A Kohlberg (Mexico) L Lavalle	7	6
WC	(Sweden) U Stenlund (Sweden) H Sundström	5	1
(United States) J Klaparda (United States) J Rive	6	6
(Sweden) J Carlsson (Finland) O Rahnasto	1	3
(Sweden) P Lundgren (Sweden) S Simonsson	2	6	2
(United States) D Cassidy (United States) M Purcell	6	4	6

Second round
(United States) K Jones (United States) T Warneke	6	6
(Brazil) R Acioly (United States) R Matuszewski	3	4
(Sweden) J Gunnarsson (Sweden) M Pernfors	7	3	2
4	(United States) S Stewart (New Zealand) K Warwick	5	6	6
8	(United States) A Kohlberg (Mexico) L Lavalle	6	6
(United States) J Klaparda (United States) J Rive	4	4
(United States) D Cassidy (United States) M Purcell	6	7
2	(United States) M De Palmer (United States) G Donnelly	4	6

Quarterfinals
(United States) K Jones (United States) T Warneke	6	1	5
4	(United States) S Stewart (New Zealand) K Warwick	4	6	7
8	(United States) A Kohlberg (Mexico) L Lavalle	3	6	6
(United States) D Cassidy (United States) M Purcell	6	2	3

Semifinals
4	(United States) S Stewart (New Zealand) K Warwick	6	7
8	(United States) A Kohlberg (Mexico) L Lavalle	2	5
