= 1986 Stockholm Open – Singles =

Singles
- 1986 Stockholm Open

Final
- Champion: (Sweden) Stefan Edberg
- Runner-up: (Sweden) Mats Wilander
- Score: 6–2, 6–1, 6–1

Details
- Draw: 56
- Seeds: 16

Events
Singles	Doubles
← 1985 ·	Stockholm Open	· 1987 →

John McEnroe was the defending champion, but did not participate this year.

Stefan Edberg won the title, defeating Mats Wilander 6–2, 6–1, 6–1 in the final.

== Seeds ==
1. (Sweden) Stefan Edberg (champion)
2. (Sweden) Mats Wilander (final)
3. (France) Henri Leconte (semifinals)
4. (Sweden) Mikael Pernfors (second round)
5. (Sweden) Kent Carlsson (quarterfinals)
6. (United States) Tim Mayotte (quarterfinals)
7. (United States) Kevin Curren (third round)
8. (Switzerland) Jakob Hlasek (third round)
9. (Sweden) Ulf Stenlund (first round)
10. (Socialist Federal Republic of Yugoslavia) Slobodan Živojinović (second round)
11. (United States) Tim Wilkison (second round, retired)
12. (Sweden) Jonas Svensson (third round)
13. (France) Guy Forget (semifinals)
14. (United States) Jonathan Canter (second round)
15. (Czechoslovakia) Karel Nováček (second round)
16. (Sweden) Jan Gunnarsson (third round)

== Draw ==
=== Key ===
- Q = Qualifier
- WC = Wild card
- LL = Lucky loser
- Alt = Alternate
- SE = Special exempt
- PR = Protected ranking
- ITF = ITF entry
- JE = Junior exempt
- w/o = Walkover
- r = Retired
- d = Defaulted
- SR = Special ranking

=== Finals ===
Semifinals
1	(Sweden) Stefan Edberg	6	6	7
3	(France) Henri Leconte	7	4	6
13	(France) Guy Forget	2	6
2	(Sweden) Mats Wilander	6	7

Final
1	(Sweden) Stefan Edberg	6	6	6
2	(Sweden) Mats Wilander	2	1	1

=== Top half ===
==== Section 1 ====
First round
(Israel) S Perkiss	6	6
Q	(Canada) C Pridham	3	3
(Australia) P Cash	4	6	6
(United States) M Purcell	6	2	1
(Spain) J Avendaño	4	6	2
15	(Czechoslovakia) K Nováček	6	3	6
10	(Socialist Federal Republic of Yugoslavia) S Živojinović	2	6	6
WC	(Sweden) S Eriksson	6	3	4
Q	(United States) R Matuszewski	6	6
Q	(United States) T Warneke	2	2
WC	(Sweden) P Carlsson	4	2
(United Kingdom) J Bates	6	6

Second round
1	(Sweden) S Edberg	6	6
(Israel) S Perkiss	3	2
(Australia) P Cash	6	6	6
15	(Czechoslovakia) K Nováček	3	7	1
10	(Socialist Federal Republic of Yugoslavia) S Živojinović	2	5
Q	(United States) R Matuszewski	6	7
(United Kingdom) J Bates	7	4	6
8	(Switzerland) J Hlasek	6	6	7

Third round
1	(Sweden) S Edberg	7	6
(Australia) P Cash	6	4
Q	(United States) R Matuszewski	7	6
8	(Switzerland) J Hlasek	6	1

Quarterfinals
1	(Sweden) S Edberg	6	5	7
Q	(United States) R Matuszewski	3	7	6

==== Section 2 ====
First round
(Sweden) T Högstedt	6	3	7
(United States) J Sadri	4	6	5
(Spain) S Casal	7	6
Q	(United States) J Klaparda	6	4
(United States) T Nelson	4	4
14	(United States) J Canter	6	6
11	(United States) T Wilkison	4	7	6
(Belgium) L Pimek	6	6	4
(Mexico) L Lavalle	4	1
(United States) B Testerman	6	6
(United States) D Goldie	6	6
WC	(Sweden) R Båthman	4	0

Second round
3	(France) H Leconte	6	7
(Sweden) T Högstedt	3	5
(Spain) S Casal	7	6
14	(United States) J Canter	5	2
11	(United States) T Wilkison	6	3^{r}
(United States) B Testerman	3	4
(United States) D Goldie	4	3
6	(United States) T Mayotte	6	6

Third round
3	(France) H Leconte	6	7
(Spain) S Casal	4	6
(United States) B Testerman	5	6
6	(United States) T Mayotte	7	7

Quarterfinals
3	(France) H Leconte	6	6
6	(United States) T Mayotte	3	4

=== Bottom half ===
==== Section 3 ====
First round
(Socialist Federal Republic of Yugoslavia) M Ostoja	3	2
(Netherlands) M Schapers	6	6
WC	(West Germany) M Westphal	4	0
(Sweden) C Bergström	6	6
Q	(Sweden) F Waern	4	2
12	(Sweden) J Svensson	6	6
13	(France) G Forget	6	6
Q	(Sweden) M Gustafsson	2	4
(United States) B Schultz	6	3
WC	(Sweden) J Windahl	7	6
(United States) S Davis	6	6
(France) T Champion	2	3

Second round
5	(Sweden) K Carlsson	6	6
(Netherlands) M Schapers	2	2
(Sweden) C Bergström	6	3	2
12	(Sweden) J Svensson	4	6	6
13	(France) G Forget	6	6
WC	(Sweden) J Windahl	1	2
(United States) S Davis	7	6
4	(Sweden) M Pernfors	6	4

Third round
5	(Sweden) K Carlsson	6	3	6
12	(Sweden) J Svensson	2	6	3
13	(France) G Forget	6	6
(United States) S Davis	1	4

Quarterfinals
5	(Sweden) K Carlsson	6	4
13	(France) G Forget	7	6

==== Section 4 ====
First round
(Sweden) J Carlsson	7	6
(Israel) A Mansdorf	6	4
(Sweden) P Lundgren	4	2
(United States) D Rostagno	6	6
(United States) G Donnelly	6	6
9	(Sweden) U Stenlund	2	3
16	(Sweden) J Gunnarsson	4	6	7
(Sweden) H Sundström	6	4	5
(Australia) W Masur	6	6
Q	(United States) K Jones	4	4
(United States) M De Palmer	7	7
(United States) M Anger	6	5

Second round
7	(United States) K Curren	6	6
(Sweden) J Carlsson	2	2
(United States) D Rostagno	5	5
(United States) G Donnelly	7	7
16	(Sweden) J Gunnarsson	6	6
(Australia) W Masur	3	4
(United States) M De Palmer	4	6
2	(Sweden) M Wilander	6	7

Third round
7	(United States) K Curren	6	6	6
(United States) G Donnelly	7	3	7
16	(Sweden) J Gunnarsson	5	5
2	(Sweden) M Wilander	7	7

Quarterfinals
(United States) G Donnelly	5	0
2	(Sweden) M Wilander	7	6
