= 1986 Pilot Pen Classic – Singles =

Singles
- 1986 Pilot Pen Classic

Final
- Champion: (Sweden) Joakim Nyström
- Runner-up: (France) Yannick Noah
- Score: 6–1, 6–3, 6–2

Details
- Draw: 56
- Seeds: 16

Events
Singles	Doubles
- Pilot Pen Classic

Larry Stefanki was the defending champion but lost in the second round to David Pate.

Joakim Nyström won in the final 6–1, 6–3, 6–2 against Yannick Noah.

== Seeds ==
The top eight seeds received a bye into the second round.

1. (Sweden) Mats Wilander (quarterfinals)
2. (United States) Jimmy Connors (semifinals)
3. (West Germany) Boris Becker (quarterfinals)
4. (France) Yannick Noah (final)
5. (Sweden) Joakim Nyström (champion)
6. (United States) Johan Kriek (second round)
7. (United States) Scott Davis (second round)
8. (United States) Jimmy Arias (third round)
9. (United States) David Pate (quarterfinals)
10. (France) Thierry Tulasne (semifinals)
11. (Sweden) Jan Gunnarsson (first round)
12. (Sweden) Peter Lundgren (second round)
13. (United States) Matt Anger (second round)
14. (Switzerland) Jakob Hlasek (first round)
15. (West Germany) Andreas Maurer (first round)
16. (United States) Aaron Krickstein (third round)

== Draw ==
Key

- Q = Qualifier
- WC = Wild card
- LL = Lucky loser
- Alt = Alternate
- ITF = ITF entry
- PR = Protected ranking
- SR = Special ranking
- SE = Special exempt
- JE = Junior exempt
- JR = Junior Accelerator Programme entrant
- CO = College Accelerator Programme entrant
- NG = Next Gen Accelerator Program entrant
- w/o = Walkover
- r = Retired
- d = Defaulted

=== Finals ===
Semifinals
10	(France) Thierry Tulasne	2	7	5
4	(France) Yannick Noah	6	6	7
5	(Sweden) Joakim Nyström	6	6
2	(United States) Jimmy Connors	4	2

Final
4	(France) Yannick Noah	1	3	2
5	(Sweden) Joakim Nyström	6	6	6

=== Top half ===
==== Section 1 ====
First round
Q	(United States) A Agassi	6	6
WC	(United States) J Austin	4	2
(Belgium) L Pimek	7	6
Q	(South Africa) E Edwards	5	3
WC	(United States) E Teltscher	6	5	2
16	(United States) A Krickstein	4	7	6
10	(France) T Tulasne	6	6
Q	(South Africa) B Moir	1	3
(West Germany) M Westphal	6	6
(United States) M Davis	4	2
(Spain) S Casal	4	4
(Socialist Federal Republic of Yugoslavia) S Živojinović	6	6

Second round
1	(Sweden) M Wilander	6	6
Q	(United States) A Agassi	1	1
(Belgium) L Pimek	5	1
16	(United States) A Krickstein	7	6
10	(France) T Tulasne	6	6
(West Germany) M Westphal	2	2
(Socialist Federal Republic of Yugoslavia) S Živojinović	2	5
8	(United States) J Arias	6	7

Third round
1	(Sweden) M Wilander	7	6
16	(United States) A Krickstein	5	1
10	(France) T Tulasne	6	6
8	(United States) J Arias	3	4

Quarterfinals
1	(Sweden) M Wilander	4	3
10	(France) T Tulasne	6	6

==== Section 2 ====
First round
(West Germany) H Schwaier	5	1
(United States) T Wilkison	7	6
(Haiti) R Agénor	1	5
(United States) J Canter	6	7
(United States) D Goldie	4	6	6
14	(Switzerland) J Hlasek	6	4	4
11	(Sweden) J Gunnarsson	4	2
Q	(Sweden) M Pernfors	6	6
(United States) B Testerman	5	2
(Spain) E Sánchez	7	6
(Israel) S Perkiss	1	3
Q	(Netherlands) M Schapers	6	6

Second round
4	(France) Y Noah	6	6
(United States) T Wilkison	4	4
(United States) J Canter	6	4	1
(United States) D Goldie	4	6	6
Q	(Sweden) M Pernfors	6	6
(Spain) E Sánchez	4	3
Q	(Netherlands) M Schapers	6	6
6	(United States) J Kriek	3	2

Third round
4	(France) Y Noah	6	7
(United States) D Goldie	3	6
Q	(Sweden) M Pernfors	6	7
Q	(Netherlands) M Schapers	3	5

Quarterfinals
4	(France) Y Noah	7	7
Q	(Sweden) M Pernfors	5	5

=== Bottom half ===
==== Section 3 ====
First round
(South Africa) C Steyn	6	6	6
(West Germany) D Keretić	4	7	7
(United States) G Holmes	6	3
WC	(United States) B Pearce	7	6
(India) R Krishnan	3	1
12	(Sweden) P Lundgren	6	6
13	(United States) M Anger	6	6
Q	(United States) D Cassidy	4	1
(France) G Forget	3	6	2
(Spain) J Higueras	6	4	6
(Uruguay) D Pérez	3	5
(United States) M Leach	6	7

Second round
5	(Sweden) J Nyström	6	6
(West Germany) D Keretić	2	2
WC	(United States) B Pearce	6	6
12	(Sweden) P Lundgren	2	4
13	(United States) M Anger	5	5
(Spain) J Higueras	7	7
(United States) M Leach	3	3
3	(West Germany) B Becker	6	6

Third round
5	(Sweden) J Nyström	6	6
WC	(United States) B Pearce	3	4
(Spain) J Higueras	2	4
3	(West Germany) B Becker	6	6

Quarterfinals
5	(Sweden) J Nyström	7	6
3	(West Germany) B Becker	6	2

==== Section 4 ====
First round
(United States) M De Palmer	6	5	1
(Czechoslovakia) M Vajda	2	7	6
(United States) L Stefanki	6	6
(United Kingdom) J Lloyd	1	2
(Spain) J Aguilera	2	5
9	(United States) D Pate	6	7
15	(West Germany) A Maurer	6	7	4
(Peru) J Yzaga	7	6	6
(United States) J Brown	6	6
(United States) S Giammalva Jr.	3	4
Q	(Socialist Federal Republic of Yugoslavia) M Ostoja	6	2	6
(United States) V Van Patten	4	6	3

Second round
7	(United States) S Davis	6	1	4
(Czechoslovakia) M Vajda	2	6	6
(United States) L Stefanki	4	0
9	(United States) D Pate	6	6
(Peru) J Yzaga	6	7
(United States) J Brown	2	5
Q	(Socialist Federal Republic of Yugoslavia) M Ostoja	6	4	4
2	(United States) J Connors	1	6	6

Third round
(Czechoslovakia) M Vajda	4	4
9	(United States) D Pate	6	6
(Peru) J Yzaga	1	2
2	(United States) J Connors	6	6

Quarterfinals
9	(United States) D Pate	5	4
2	(United States) J Connors	7	6
