= 1986 Grand Prix German Open – Singles =

Singles
- 1986 Grand Prix German Open

Final
- Champion: (France) Henri Leconte
- Runner-up: (Czechoslovakia) Miloslav Mečíř
- Score: 6–2, 5–7, 6–4, 6–2

Details
- Draw: 56 (5WC/7Q/2SE)
- Seeds: 16

Events
Singles	Doubles
- Hamburg European Open

Miloslav Mečíř was the defending champion, but lost in the final to Henri Leconte. The score was 6–2, 5–7, 6–4, 6–2. Leconte became the last French player to win the tournament until Gilles Simon won it in 2011.

== Seeds ==
The first eight seeds received a bye to the second round.

1. (West Germany) Boris Becker (second round)
2. (Sweden) Joakim Nyström (third round)
3. (Czechoslovakia) Miloslav Mečíř (final)
4. (France) Henri Leconte (champion)
5. (Ecuador) Andrés Gómez (second round)
6. (France) Thierry Tulasne (second round)
7. (Spain) Emilio Sánchez (semifinals)
8. (Argentina) Martín Jaite (third round)
9. (Argentina) Guillermo Vilas (second round)
10. (Sweden) Kent Carlsson (semifinals)
11. (West Germany) Eric Jelen (first round)
12. (Switzerland) Jakob Hlasek (quarterfinals)
13. (Czechoslovakia) Milan Šrejber (third round)
14. (Italy) Paolo Canè (first round)
15. (Argentina) Horacio de la Peña (third round)
16. (Australia) Paul McNamee (second round)

== Draw ==
Key

- Q = Qualifier
- WC = Wild card
- LL = Lucky loser
- Alt = Alternate
- ITF = ITF entry
- PR = Protected ranking
- SR = Special ranking
- SE = Special exempt
- JE = Junior exempt
- JR = Junior Accelerator Programme entrant
- CO = College Accelerator Programme entrant
- NG = Next Gen Accelerator Program entrant
- w/o = Walkover
- r = Retired
- d = Defaulted

=== Finals ===
Quarterfinals
(United States) Mel Purcell	2	1
7	(Spain) Emilio Sánchez	6	6
4	(France) Henri Leconte	6	0	7
(Austria) Thomas Muster	2	6	5
12	(Switzerland) Jakob Hlasek	0	2
3	(Czechoslovakia) Miloslav Mečíř	6	6
10	(Sweden) Kent Carlsson	6	6	6
(Sweden) Henrik Sundström	2	7	2

Semifinals
7	(Spain) Emilio Sánchez	4	2
4	(France) Henri Leconte	6	6
3	(Czechoslovakia) Miloslav Mečíř	6	6
10	(Sweden) Kent Carlsson	3	2

Final
4	(France) Henri Leconte	6	5	6	6
3	(Czechoslovakia) Miloslav Mečíř	2	7	4	2

=== Top half ===
==== Section 1 ====
First round
WC	(West Germany) A Stepanek	3	4
(United States) M Purcell	6	6
(United States) J Brown	6	3	3
(France) G Forget	3	6	6
(Czechoslovakia) K Nováček	6	4
15	(Argentina) H de la Peña	7	6
9	(Argentina) G Vilas	7	7
(Brazil) C Motta	5	6
(Spain) S Casal	6	6
WC	(West Germany) P Kühnen	1	2
(Sweden) J Svensson	6	6
(Socialist Federal Republic of Yugoslavia) M Ostoja	1	4

Second round
1	(West Germany) B Becker	5	6	6
(United States) M Purcell	7	2	7
(France) G Forget	4	4
15	(Argentina) H de la Peña	6	6
9	(Argentina) G Vilas	3	4
(Spain) S Casal	6	6
(Sweden) J Svensson	4	2
7	(Spain) E Sánchez	6	6

Third round
(United States) M Purcell	6	6
15	(Argentina) H de la Peña	3	3
(Spain) S Casal	2	1
7	(Spain) E Sánchez	6	6

Quarterfinals
(United States) M Purcell	2	1
7	(Spain) E Sánchez	6	6

==== Section 2 ====
First round
Q	(South Africa) M Robertson	6	1	6
(West Germany) A Maurer	2	6	7
(Argentina) E Bengoechea	6	6
SE	(Canada) M Wostenholme	2	3
WC	(West Germany) H Schwaier	2	4
13	(Czechoslovakia) M Šrejber	6	6
11	(West Germany) E Jelen	4	1
(Czechoslovakia) P Složil	6	6
(Uruguay) D Pérez	6	0	4
Q	(Argentina) G Pérez Roldán	1	6	6
(Austria) T Muster	7	6
(Haiti) R Agénor	5	2

Second round
4	(France) H Leconte	6	6
(West Germany) A Maurer	1	3
(Argentina) E Bengoechea	4	5
13	(Czechoslovakia) M Šrejber	6	7
(Czechoslovakia) P Složil	3	6	2
Q	(Argentina) G Pérez Roldán	6	2	6
(Austria) T Muster	7	6
6	(France) T Tulasne	6	2

Third round
4	(France) H Leconte	6	6
13	(Czechoslovakia) M Šrejber	4	3
Q	(Argentina) G Pérez Roldán	3	1
(Austria) T Muster	6	6

Quarterfinals
4	(France) H Leconte	6	0	7
(Austria) T Muster	2	6	5

=== Bottom half ===
==== Section 3 ====
First round
(Sweden) J Carlsson	4	3
(West Germany) M Westphal	6	6
WC	(West Germany) C Saceanu	6	3
(Czechoslovakia) T Šmíd	7	6
Q	(Czechoslovakia) I Werner	6	6	1
12	(Switzerland) J Hlasek	4	7	6
14	(Italy) P Canè	4	5
(Sweden) U Stenlund	6	7
Q	(Argentina) F Davín	7	6
(West Germany) D Keretić	5	1
(Sweden) J Gunnarsson	6	6
(South Africa) B Moir	3	4

Second round
5	(Ecuador) A Gómez	4	4
(West Germany) M Westphal	6	6
(Czechoslovakia) T Šmíd	2	3
12	(Switzerland) J Hlasek	6	6
(Sweden) U Stenlund	6	2
Q	(Argentina) F Davín	7	6
(Sweden) J Gunnarsson	1	1
3	(Czechoslovakia) M Mečíř	6	6

Third round
(West Germany) M Westphal	2	2
12	(Switzerland) J Hlasek	6	6
Q	(Argentina) F Davín	2	6	2
3	(Czechoslovakia) M Mečíř	6	4	6

Quarterfinals
12	(Switzerland) J Hlasek	0	2
3	(Czechoslovakia) M Mečíř	6	6

==== Section 4 ====
First round
(Spain) F Luna	6	3
(Czechoslovakia) L Pimek	7	6
Q	(Spain) J Avendaño	2	2
WC	(West Germany) R Osterthun	6	6
Q	(West Germany) T Meinecke	5	3
10	(Sweden) K Carlsson	7	6
16	(Australia) P McNamee	7	1	7
SE	(Argentina) C Miniussi	5	6	5
(Sweden) H Sundström	4	6	6
Q	(West Germany) P Vojtíšek	6	4	2
(Netherlands) M Schapers	5	7	6
(Brazil) L Mattar	7	5	7

Second round
8	(Argentina) M Jaite	6	6
(Czechoslovakia) L Pimek	2	3
WC	(West Germany) R Osterthun	2	1
10	(Sweden) K Carlsson	6	6
16	(Australia) P McNamee	6	0	6
(Sweden) H Sundström	3	6	7
(Brazil) L Mattar	3	6	3
2	(Sweden) J Nyström	6	1	6

Third round
8	(Argentina) M Jaite	5	5
10	(Sweden) K Carlsson	7	7
(Sweden) H Sundström	6	6
2	(Sweden) J Nyström	3	4

Quarterfinals
10	(Sweden) K Carlsson	6	6	6
(Sweden) H Sundström	2	7	2
