= 1986 Bordeaux Open – Singles =

Singles
- 1986 Bordeaux Open

Final
- Champion: (Italy) Paolo Canè
- Runner-up: (Sweden) Kent Carlsson
- Score: 6–4, 1–6, 7–5

Details
- Draw: 32 (2WC/4Q/1LL)
- Seeds: 8

Events
Singles	Doubles
← 1985 ·	ATP Bordeaux	· 1987 →

Diego Pérez was the defending champion, but lost in the quarterfinals to Ulf Stenlund.

Paolo Canè won the title by defeating Kent Carlsson 6–4, 1–6, 7–5 in the final.

== Seeds ==
1. (France) Henri Leconte (second round, retired)
2. (France) Thierry Tulasne (quarterfinals)
3. (Sweden) Kent Carlsson (final)
4. (Uruguay) Diego Pérez (quarterfinals)
5. (Czechoslovakia) Libor Pimek (quarterfinals)
6. (Sweden) Ulf Stenlund (semifinals)
7. (Haiti) Ronald Agénor (semifinals)
8. (Spain) Fernando Luna (second round)

== Draw ==
=== Key ===
- Q = Qualifier
- WC = Wild card
- LL = Lucky loser
- Alt = Alternate
- SE = Special exempt
- PR = Protected ranking
- ITF = ITF entry
- JE = Junior exempt
- w/o = Walkover
- r = Retired
- d = Defaulted
- SR = Special ranking

=== Finals ===
Semifinals
(Italy) Paolo Canè	6	6
6	(Sweden) Ulf Stenlund	4	2
3	(Sweden) Kent Carlsson	6	4	6
7/WC	(Haiti) Ronald Agénor	3	6	1

Final
(Italy) Paolo Canè	6	1	7
3	(Sweden) Kent Carlsson	4	6	5

=== Top half ===
First round
1	(France) H Leconte	6	6
(Belgium) E Masso	3	2
(Argentina) R Argüello	1	2
(France) T Champion	6	6
(Italy) F Cancellotti	6	4
(Italy) P Canè	7	6
Q	(Spain) J López-Maeso	3	3
8	(Spain) F Luna	6	6
4	(Uruguay) D Pérez	6	6
Q	(France) T Allan	1	2
Q	(France) T Van Den Daele	6	1
(West Germany) A Stepanek	7	6
(Sweden) R Båthman	5	6	0
(Spain) J Aguilera	7	4	6
(Australia) M Woodforde	3	3
6	(Sweden) U Stenlund	6	6

Second round
1	(France) H Leconte	3	6	1^{r}
(France) T Champion	6	2	4
(Italy) P Canè	7	6
8	(Spain) F Luna	6	2
4	(Uruguay) D Pérez	6	6
(West Germany) A Stepanek	3	4
(Spain) J Aguilera	2	5
6	(Sweden) U Stenlund	6	7

Quarterfinals
(France) T Champion	5	1
(Italy) P Canè	7	6
4	(Uruguay) D Pérez	6	5
6	(Sweden) U Stenlund	7	7

Semifinals
(Italy) P Canè	6	6
6	(Sweden) U Stenlund	4	2

=== Bottom half ===
First round
5	(Czechoslovakia) L Pimek	6	6
(Spain) D de Miguel	4	3
WC	(France) JP Fleurian	1	2
(Switzerland) C Mezzadri	6	6
Q	(Italy) S Colombo	4	4
(Spain) J Arrese	6	6
(Italy) C Pistolesi	2	1
3	(Sweden) K Carlsson	6	6
7/WC	(Haiti) R Agénor	6	6	6
(France) T Benhabiles	7	1	4
(Sweden) H Sundström	6	6
(Netherlands) M Oosting	4	4
(United States) D Rostagno	4	6	0
LL	(New Zealand) B Derlin	6	3	6
(Spain) J Avendaño	5	5
2	(France) T Tulasne	7	7

Second round
5	(Czechoslovakia) L Pimek	6	7
(Switzerland) C Mezzadri	2	5
(Spain) J Arrese	4	2
3	(Sweden) K Carlsson	6	6
7/WC	(Haiti) R Agénor	7	3	6
(Sweden) H Sundström	6	6	3
LL	(New Zealand) B Derlin	3	4
2	(France) T Tulasne	6	6

Quarterfinals
5	(Czechoslovakia) L Pimek	0	2
3	(Sweden) K Carlsson	6	6
7/WC	(Haiti) R Agénor	6	6
2	(France) T Tulasne	4	1

Semifinals
3	(Sweden) K Carlsson	6	4	6
7/WC	(Haiti) R Agénor	3	6	1
