= 1986 Torneo Internazionale Città di Firenze =

- Date: 19–25 May
- Edition: 14th
- Category: Grand Prix
- Draw: 32S / 16D
- Prize money: $85,000
- Surface: Clay / outdoor
- Location: Florence, Italy

Champions

Singles
- (Ecuador) Andrés Gómez

Doubles
- (Spain) Sergio Casal / (Spain) Emilio Sánchez
- ATP Florence

The 1986 Torneo Internazionale Città di Firenze, also known as the Florence Open, was a men's tennis tournament played on outdoor clay courts in Florence, Italy that was part of the 1986 Nabisco Grand Prix circuit. It was the 14th edition of the tournament and was played from 19 May until 25 May 1986. First-seeded Andrés Gómez won the singles title.

== Finals ==
=== Singles ===
(Ecuador) Andrés Gómez defeated (Sweden) Henrik Sundström 6–3, 6–4

- It was Gómez's 2nd singles title of the year and the 1st of his career.

=== Doubles ===
(Spain) Sergio Casal / (Spain) Emilio Sánchez defeated (United States) Mike De Palmer / (United States) Gary Donnelly 6–4, 7–6

- It was Casal's 2nd doubles title of the year and the 5th of his career. It was Sánchez's 2nd doubles title of the year and the 5th of his career.
