= 1986 Pilot Pen Classic =

- Date: February 24 – March 3
- Edition: 13th
- Draw: 56S /28D
- Prize money: $325,000
- Surface: Hard / outdoor
- Location: La Quinta, California, U.S.
- Venue: La Quinta Resort and Club

Champions

Singles
- (Sweden) Joakim Nyström

Doubles
- (United States) Peter Fleming / (France) Guy Forget
← 1985 ·	Pilot Pen Classic	· 1987 →

The 1986 Pilot Pen Classic was a men's tennis tournament played on outdoor hard courts. It was the 13th edition of the Indian Wells Masters and was part of the 1986 Nabisco Grand Prix. It was played at the La Quinta Resort and Club in La Quinta, California in the United States from February 24 through March 3, 1986. Fifth-seeded Joakim Nyström won the singles title.

== Finals ==
=== Singles ===
(Sweden) Joakim Nyström defeated (France) Yannick Noah 6–1, 6–3, 6–2

- It was Nyström's 3rd title of the year and the 13th of his career.

=== Doubles ===
(United States) Peter Fleming / (France) Guy Forget defeated (France) Yannick Noah / (United States) Sherwood Stewart 6–4, 6–3

- It was Fleming's 1st title of the year and the 58th of his career. It was Forget's 1st title of the year and the 3rd of his career.
