= 1986 Campionati Internazionali della Valle D'Aosta =

- Date: 11–17 August
- Edition: 1st
- Category: Grand Prix
- Draw: 32S / 16D
- Prize money: $85,000
- Surface: Clay / outdoor
- Location: Saint-Vincent, Aosta Valley Italy

Champions

Singles
- (Italy) Simone Colombo

Doubles
- (Czechoslovakia) Libor Pimek / (Czechoslovakia) Pavel Složil
- ATP Saint-Vincent

The 1986 Campionati Internazionali della Valle D'Aosta (International Championships of Valle d'Aosta), was a men's tennis tournament played on outdoor clay courts that was part of the 1986 Nabisco Grand Prix. It was the inaugural edition of the tournament and took place in Saint-Vincent, Aosta Valley, Italy, from 11 August until 17 August 1986. Eighth-seeded Simone Colombo won the singles title.

== Finals ==
=== Singles ===
(Italy) Simone Colombo defeated (Australia) Paul McNamee, 2–6, 6–3, 7–6^{(7–2)}

- It was Colombo's singles title of the year and the 1st of his career.

=== Doubles ===
(Czechoslovakia) Libor Pimek / (Czechoslovakia) Pavel Složil defeated (United States) Bud Cox / (Australia) Michael Fancutt, 6–3, 6–3

- It was Pimek's 2nd and last doubles title of the year and 5th of his career. It was Složil's 2nd and last doubles title of the year and the 32nd and last of his career.
