= 1986 Pilot Pen Classic – Doubles =

Doubles
- 1986 Pilot Pen Classic

Final
- Champions: (United States) Peter Fleming (France) Guy Forget
- Runners-up: (France) Yannick Noah (United States) Sherwood Stewart
- Score: 6–4, 6–3

Details
- Draw: 28
- Seeds: 8

Events
| Singles | Doubles |
- Pilot Pen Classic

Heinz Günthardt and Balázs Taróczy were the defending champions but did not compete that year.

Peter Fleming and Guy Forget won in the final 6–4, 6–3 against Yannick Noah and Sherwood Stewart.

== Seeds ==
The top four seeded teams received byes into the second round.

1. (United States) Scott Davis / (United States) David Pate (second round)
2. (Sweden) Joakim Nyström / (Sweden) Mats Wilander (quarterfinals)
3. (United States) Peter Fleming / (France) Guy Forget (champions)
4. (France) Yannick Noah / (United States) Sherwood Stewart (final)
5. (Spain) Sergio Casal / (Spain) Emilio Sánchez (first round)
6. (Australia) Pat Cash / (United States) Tim Wilkison (first round)
7. (United States) Mike De Palmer / (United States) Gary Donnelly (semifinals)
8. (West Germany) Boris Becker / (Socialist Federal Republic of Yugoslavia) Slobodan Živojinović (semifinals)

== Draw ==
Key

- Q = Qualifier
- WC = Wild card
- LL = Lucky loser
- Alt = Alternate
- ITF = ITF entry
- PR = Protected ranking
- SR = Special ranking
- SE = Special exempt
- JE = Junior exempt
- JR = Junior Accelerator Programme entrant
- CO = College Accelerator Programme entrant
- NG = Next Gen Accelerator Program entrant
- w/o = Walkover
- r = Retired
- d = Defaulted

=== Finals ===
Semifinals
8 | (West Germany) Boris Becker (Socialist Federal Republic of Yugoslavia) Slobodan Živojinović | 2 | 1
4 | (France) Yannick Noah (United States) Sherwood Stewart | 6 | 6
3 | (United States) Peter Fleming (France) Guy Forget | 6 | 7
7 | (United States) Mike De Palmer (United States) Gary Donnelly | 4 | 6

Final
4 | (France) Yannick Noah (United States) Sherwood Stewart | 4 | 3
3 | (United States) Peter Fleming (France) Guy Forget | 6 | 6

=== Top half ===
First round
(South Africa) C Steyn (South Africa) D Visser | 2 | 7 | 4
(Australia) D Graham (United States) B Testerman | 6 | 5 | 6
(United States) R Leach (United States) T Pawsat | 6 | 7 | 6
(South Africa) E Edwards (New Zealand) R Simpson | 7 | 6 | 4
(Israel) S Perkiss (West Germany) W Popp | 4 | 6
8 | (West Germany) B Becker (Socialist Federal Republic of Yugoslavia) S Živojinović | 6 | 7
(United States) J Kriek (United Kingdom) J Lloyd | 6 | 6 | 6
(United States) S Mayer (United States) L Stefanki | 7 | 3 | 3
(United States) M Davis (United States) C Dunk | 6 | 3 | 3
(Australia) L Warder (Australia) K Warwick | 1 | 6 | 6
(United States) A Kohlberg (United States) R Van't Hof | 3 | 6 | 6
6 | (Australia) P Cash (United States) T Wilkison | 6 | 4 | 3

Second round
1 | (United States) S Davis (United States) D Pate | 4 | 6
(Australia) D Graham (United States) B Testerman | 6 | 7
(United States) R Leach (United States) T Pawsat | 6 | 3 | 4
8 | (West Germany) B Becker (Socialist Federal Republic of Yugoslavia) S Živojinović | 4 | 6 | 6
4 | (France) Y Noah (United States) S Stewart | 6 | 6 | 6
(United States) J Kriek (United Kingdom) J Lloyd | 7 | 1 | 3
(Australia) L Warder (Australia) K Warwick | 3 | 4
(United States) A Kohlberg (United States) R Van't Hof | 6 | 6

Quarterfinals
(Australia) D Graham (United States) B Testerman | 6 | 3 | 4
8 | (West Germany) B Becker (Socialist Federal Republic of Yugoslavia) S Živojinović | 4 | 6 | 6
4 | (France) Y Noah (United States) S Stewart | 7 | 7
(United States) A Kohlberg (United States) R Van't Hof | 6 | 6

Semifinals
8 | (West Germany) B Becker (Socialist Federal Republic of Yugoslavia) S Živojinović | 2 | 1
4 | (France) Y Noah (United States) S Stewart | 6 | 6

=== Bottom half ===
First round
5 | (Spain) S Casal (Spain) E Sánchez | 2 | 2
(Switzerland) J Hlasek (Sweden) H Simonsson | 6 | 6
(Australia) B Dyke (United States) M Robertson | 7 | 6
(United States) M Mitchell (United States) B Willenborg | 5 | 4
(United States) R Lutz (United States) S Smith | 3 | 7 | 4
(Haiti) R Agénor (France) T Tulasne | 6 | 6 | 6
7 | (United States) M De Palmer (United States) G Donnelly | 6 | 7
(United States) M Leach (Belgium) L Pimek | 3 | 5
(Sweden) J Gunnarsson (Sweden) P Lundgren | 4 | 6 | 6
(Netherlands) T Nijssen (Netherlands) M Schapers | 6 | 3 | 3
(United States) S Giammalva Jr. (United States) G Holmes | 6 | 6
(United States) R Baxter (United States) J Levine | 4 | 1

Second round
(Switzerland) J Hlasek (Sweden) H Simonsson | 6 | 6
(Australia) B Dyke (United States) M Robertson | 4 | 2
(Haiti) R Agénor (France) T Tulasne | 2 | 2
3 | (United States) P Fleming (France) G Forget | 6 | 6
7 | (United States) M De Palmer (United States) G Donnelly | 4 | 6 | 6
(Sweden) J Gunnarsson (Sweden) P Lundgren | 6 | 3 | 4
(United States) S Giammalva Jr. (United States) G Holmes | 5 | 6
2 | (Sweden) J Nyström (Sweden) M Wilander | 7 | 7

Quarterfinals
(Switzerland) J Hlasek (Sweden) H Simonsson | 6 | 2
3 | (United States) P Fleming (France) G Forget | 7 | 6
7 | (United States) M De Palmer (United States) G Donnelly | 3 | 7 | 6
2 | (Sweden) J Nyström (Sweden) M Wilander | 6 | 5 | 3

Semifinals
3 | (United States) P Fleming (France) G Forget | 6 | 7
7 | (United States) M De Palmer (United States) G Donnelly | 4 | 6
