= 1986 Grand Prix German Open =

Tennis tournament

- Date: 15–21 September
- Edition: 77th
- Category: Grand Prix
- Draw: 64S / 32D
- Prize money: $250,000
- Surface: Clay / outdoor
- Location: Hamburg, West Germany
- Venue: Am Rothenbaum

Champions

Singles
- (France) Henri Leconte

Doubles
- (Spain) Emilio Sánchez / (Spain) Sergio Casal
- Grand Prix German Open

The 1986 German Open, also known by its sponsored name Ebel German Open, was a men's tennis tournament of the 1986 Nabisco Grand Prix and played on outdoor red clay courts. It was the 77th edition of the event. It took place at the Am Rothenbaum in Hamburg, West Germany, from 15 September through 21 September 1986. Fourth-seeded Henri Leconte won the singles title.

== Finals ==
=== Singles ===
(France) Henri Leconte defeated (Czechoslovakia) Miloslav Mečíř, 6–2, 5–7, 6–4, 6–2

- It was Leconte's 2nd singles title of the year and the 6th of his career.

=== Doubles ===
(Spain) Emilio Sánchez / (Spain) Sergio Casal defeated (West Germany) Boris Becker / (West Germany) Eric Jelen, 6–4, 6–1
