= 1986 Stockholm Open =

- Date: 3–9 November
- Edition: 18th
- Category: Grand Prix
- Draw: 56S / 28D
- Prize money: $350,000
- Surface: Hard / indoor
- Location: Stockholm, Sweden
- Venue: Kungliga tennishallen

Champions

Singles
- (Sweden) Stefan Edberg

Doubles
- (United States) Sherwood Stewart / (Australia) Kim Warwick
- Stockholm Open

The 1986 Stockholm Open was a men's tennis tournament played on hard courts and part of the 1986 Nabisco Grand Prix and took place at the Kungliga tennishallen in Stockholm, Sweden. It was the 18th edition of the tournament and was held from 3 November until 9 November 1986. First-seeded Stefan Edberg won the singles title.

== Finals ==
=== Singles ===
(Sweden) Stefan Edberg defeated (Sweden) Mats Wilander, 6–2, 6–1, 6–1

- It was Edberg's 3rd singles title of the year and the 8th of his career.

=== Doubles ===
(United States) Sherwood Stewart / (Australia) Kim Warwick defeated (Australia) Pat Cash / (Socialist Federal Republic of Yugoslavia) Slobodan Živojinović, 6–4, 6–4
