= Michiel Schapers =

Dutch tennis player (born 1959)

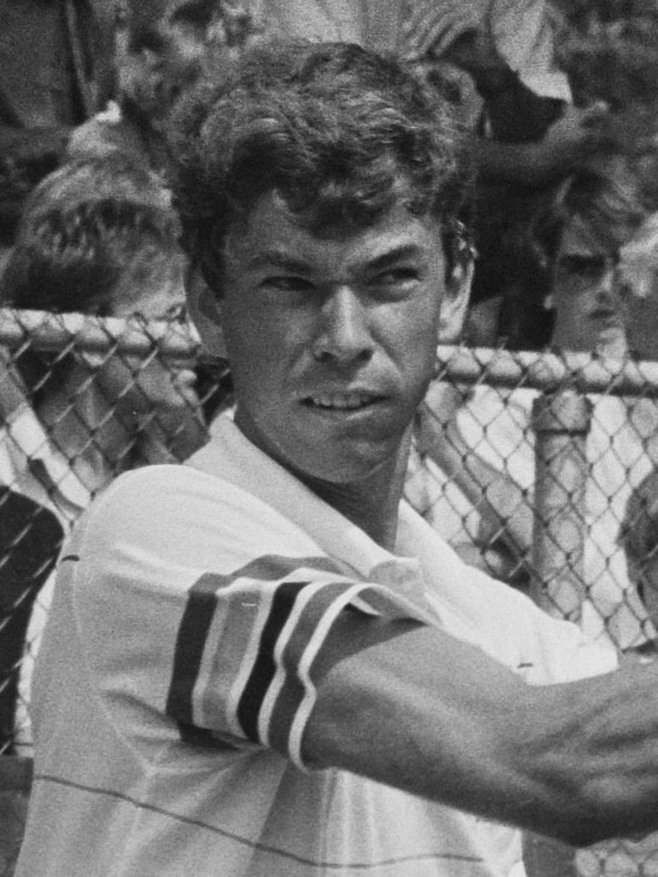
- Schapers in Hilversum, 1985
- Country (sports): Netherlands
- Residence: Eemnes, Netherlands
- Born: 11 October 1959 (age 66) Rotterdam, Netherlands
- Height: 1.98 m (6 ft 6 in)
- Turned pro: 1982
- Retired: 1993
- Plays: Right-handed (one-handed backhand)
- Prize money: $1,119,593

Singles
- Career record: 160–183
- Career titles: 0
- Highest ranking: No. 25 (25 April 1988)

Grand Slam singles results
- Australian Open: QF (1985, 1988)
- French Open: 3R (1984, 1987, 1992)
- Wimbledon: 3R (1987, 1988, 1989)
- US Open: 2R (1991)

Other tournaments
- Olympic Games: QF (1988)

Doubles
- Career record: 136–174
- Career titles: 3
- Highest ranking: No. 37 (25 February 1991)

Grand Slam doubles results
- Australian Open: 2R (1985, 1992)
- French Open: QF (1986)
- Wimbledon: 3R (1986, 1990)
- US Open: 2R (1987, 1988, 1989, 1991)

Grand Slam mixed doubles results
- Australian Open: 2R (1988)
- French Open: F (1988)
- Wimbledon: QF (1991)
- US Open: QF (1987)
- Last updated on: 31 May 2023.

Michiel Schapers (Dutch pronunciation: [miˈxil ˈsxaːpərs]; born 11 October 1959) is a Dutch former tennis player and coach.

== Tennis career ==
Turning professional in 1982, Schapers represented his native country at the 1988 Summer Olympics in Seoul, where he was defeated in quarterfinals by eventual winner Miloslav Mečíř of Czechoslovakia.

In 1987 at Wimbledon, he was the only player to take a set against eventual champion Pat Cash in their third-round match. His most famous victory was over reigning Wimbledon champion Boris Becker in the second round of the 1985 Australian Open. Schapers went on to reach the quarterfinals, his best singles result at a Grand Slam, and later equaled that result at the 1988 Australian Open. In 1988, he reached the final of the mixed-doubles draw at the French Open together with Brenda Schultz-McCarthy in which they lost to Lori McNeil and Jorge Lozano.

Schapers reached his highest singles ATP-ranking on 25 April 1988 when he became world No. 25. After his playing career, he became a coach. From 1998 until 2000, he was the captain of the Dutch Davis Cup team.

== ATP career finals ==
=== Singles: 4 (4 runner-ups) ===
Legend Grand Slam Tournaments (0–0) ATP World Tour Finals (0–0) ATP World Tour Masters Series (0–0) ATP Championship Series (0–0) ATP World Series (0–4)	Finals by surface Hard (0–1) Clay (0–0) Grass (0–1) Carpet (0–2)	Finals by setting Outdoors (0–2) Indoors (0–2)

Result	W–L	Date	Tournament	Tier	Surface	Opponent	Score
Loss	0–1	Jan 1987	Auckland, New Zealand	Grand Prix	Hard	(Czechoslovakia) Miloslav Mečíř	2–6, 3–6, 4–6
Loss	0–2	Feb 1988	Metz, France	Grand Prix	Carpet	(Sweden) Jonas Svensson	2–6, 4–6
Loss	0–3	Mar 1989	Nancy, France	Grand Prix	Carpet	(France) Guy Forget	3–6, 6–7^{(5–7)}
Loss	0–4	Jun 1991	Rosmalen, Netherlands	World Series	Grass	(Germany) Christian Saceanu	1–6, 6–3, 5–7

=== Doubles: 9 (3 titles, 6 runner-ups) ===
Legend Grand Slam Tournaments (0–0) ATP World Tour Finals (0–0) ATP World Tour Masters Series (0–0) ATP Championship Series (0–1) ATP World Series (3–5)	Finals by surface Hard (1–2) Clay (0–1) Grass (0–0) Carpet (2–3)	Finals by setting Outdoors (1–3) Indoors (2–3)

Result	W–L	Date	Tournament	Tier	Surface	Partner	Opponents	Score
Loss	0–1	Apr 1985	Marbella, Spain	Grand Prix	Clay	(France) Loïc Courteau	(Ecuador) Andrés Gómez (Brazil) Cássio Motta	1–6, 1–6
Win	1–1	Oct 1985	Cologne, West Germany	Grand Prix	Carpet	(Austria) Alex Antonitsch	(Sweden) Jan Gunnarsson (Sweden) Peter Lundgren	6–4, 7–5
Loss	1–2	Mar 1986	Metz, France	Grand Prix	Carpet	(Paraguay) Francisco González	(Poland) Wojciech Fibak (France) Guy Forget	6–2, 2–6, 4–6
Win	2–2	Oct 1987	Toulouse, France	Grand Prix	Carpet	(Poland) Wojciech Fibak	(United States) Kelly Jones (Germany) Patrik Kühnen	6–2, 6–4
Loss	2–3	Jan 1990	Adelaide, Australia	World Series	Hard	(Germany) Alexander Mronz	(United Kingdom) Andrew Castle (Nigeria) Nduka Odizor	6–7, 2–6
Loss	2–4	Oct 1990	Toulouse, France	World Series	Carpet	(Denmark) Michael Mortensen	(United Kingdom) Neil Broad (South Africa) Gary Muller	6–7, 4–6
Loss	2–5	Feb 1991	Brussels, Belgium	Championship Series	Carpet	(Belgium) Libor Pimek	(Australia) Mark Woodforde (Australia) Todd Woodbridge	3–6, 0–6
Win	3–5	Oct 1991	Tel Aviv, Israel	Grand Prix	Hard	(Czech Republic) David Rikl	(Argentina) Javier Frana (Mexico) Leonardo Lavalle	6–2, 6–7, 6–3
Loss	3–6	Jan 1992	Wellington, New Zealand	World Series	Hard	(Czech Republic) Daniel Vacek	(United States) Jared Palmer (United States) Jonathan Stark	3–6, 3–6

== ATP Challenger and ITF Futures finals ==
=== Singles: 3 (1–2) ===
Legend ATP Challenger (1–2) ITF Futures (0–0)	Finals by surface Hard (0–1) Clay (0–0) Grass (0–1) Carpet (1–0)

Result	W–L	Date	Tournament	Tier	Surface	Opponent	Score
Loss	0–1	Dec 1990	Bossonnens, Switzerland	Challenger	Hard	(Italy) Cristiano Caratti	4–6, 6–3, 6–7
Loss	0–2	Jul 1991	Newcastle, United Kingdom	Challenger	Grass	(South Africa) Christo Van Rensburg	4–6, 0–6
Win	1–2	Nov 1991	Helsinki, Finland	Challenger	Carpet	(Austria) Alex Antonitsch	7–6, 4–6, 7–5

=== Doubles: 7 (4–3) ===
Legend ATP Challenger (4–3) ITF Futures (0–0)	Finals by surface Hard (1–1) Clay (1–1) Grass (1–0) Carpet (1–1)

Result	W–L	Date	Tournament	Tier	Surface	Partner	Opponents	Score
Win	1–0	Nov 1990	The Hague, Netherlands	Challenger	Carpet	(Netherlands) Jan Siemerink	(Germany) Alexander Mronz (Russia) Andrei Olhovskiy	6–3, 7–5
Win	2–0	Dec 1990	Bossonnens, Switzerland	Challenger	Hard	(The Bahamas) Roger Smith	(Sweden) Henrik Holm (Sweden) Nils Holm	6–2, 7–6
Loss	2–1	Jan 1991	Heilbronn, Germany	Challenger	Carpet	(Germany) Christian Saceanu	(Italy) Diego Nargiso (Italy) Stefano Pescosolido	2–6, 2–6
Win	3–1	Jul 1991	Bristol, United Kingdom	Challenger	Grass	(Nigeria) Nduka Odizor	(United Kingdom) Paul Hand (Slovakia) Branislav Stankovič	4–6, 7–5, 7–6
Loss	3–2	Dec 1991	Bossonnens, Switzerland	Challenger	Hard	(Czech Republic) Daniel Vacek	(Austria) Alex Antonitsch (Netherlands) Menno Oosting	3–6, 2–6
Loss	3–3	May 1993	Dresden, Germany	Challenger	Clay	(Czech Republic) Daniel Vacek	(Netherlands) Hendrik-Jan Davids (Russia) Yevgeny Kafelnikov	3–6, 3–6
Win	4–3	Aug 1993	Poznań, Poland	Challenger	Clay	(Czech Republic) Daniel Vacek	(Italy) Cristian Brandi (Italy) Federico Mordegan	6–7, 6–4, 7–6

== Performance timelines ==
Key
W	F	SF	QF	#R	RR	Q#	DNQ	A	NH

(W) winner; (F) finalist; (SF) semifinalist; (QF) quarterfinalist; (#R) rounds 4, 3, 2, 1; (RR) round-robin stage; (Q#) qualification round; (DNQ) did not qualify; (A) absent; (NH) not held; (SR) strike rate (events won / competed); (W–L) win–loss record.

=== Singles ===
Tournament	1983	1984	1985	1986	1987	1988	1989	1990	1991	1992	1993	1994	SR	W–L	Win %
Grand Slam tournaments
Australian Open	A	A	QF	A	2R	QF	4R	1R	2R	3R	1R	A	0 / 8	15–8	65%
French Open	1R	3R	2R	2R	3R	1R	1R	1R	A	3R	Q1	A	0 / 9	8–9	47%
Wimbledon	1R	1R	A	1R	3R	3R	3R	1R	A	1R	A	A	0 / 8	6–8	43%
US Open	A	A	A	A	1R	1R	1R	A	2R	1R	A	A	0 / 5	1–5	17%
Win–loss	0–2	2–2	5–2	1–2	5–4	6–4	5–4	0–3	2–2	4–4	0–1	0–0	0 / 30	30–30	50%
National Representation
Summer Olympics	NH	A	Not Held			QF	Not Held			A	NH		0 / 1	3–1	75%
ATP Masters Series
Indian Wells	3R	A	A	A	A	A	A	3R	A	A	A	A	0 / 2	4–2	67%
Miami	A	A	2R	3R	1R	2R	1R	1R	A	1R	A	Q1	0 / 7	4–7	36%
Monte Carlo	A	A	A	A	A	2R	A	A	A	A	A	A	0 / 1	1–1	50%
Hamburg	A	A	1R	2R	A	1R	A	A	A	1R	A	Q1	0 / 4	0–4	0%
Rome	3R	A	1R	2R	A	2R	A	A	A	1R	A	A	0 / 5	4–5	44%
Canada	A	A	A	A	A	A	A	A	A	1R	A	A	0 / 1	0–1	0%
Cincinnati	A	A	A	A	A	2R	1R	A	A	A	A	A	0 / 2	1–2	33%
Paris	A	A	A	A	SF	A	A	A	A	A	A	A	0 / 1	3–1	75%
Win–loss	4–2	0–0	1–3	3–3	3–2	4–5	0–2	2–2	0–0	0–4	0–0	0–0	0 / 23	17–23	36%

=== Doubles ===
Tournament	1984	1985	1986	1987	1988	1989	1990	1991	1992	1993	1994	SR	W–L	Win %
Grand Slam tournaments
Australian Open	A	2R	A	1R	1R	A	1R	1R	2R	A	A	0 / 6	2–6	25%
French Open	1R	1R	QF	3R	1R	2R	2R	3R	1R	A	A	0 / 9	9–9	50%
Wimbledon	2R	A	3R	1R	1R	1R	3R	1R	2R	A	A	0 / 8	6–8	43%
US Open	A	A	A	2R	2R	2R	A	2R	1R	A	A	0 / 5	4–5	44%
Win–loss	1–2	1–2	5–2	3–4	1–4	2–3	3–3	3–4	2–4	0–0	0–0	0 / 28	21–28	43%
ATP Masters Series
Indian Wells	A	A	1R	2R	A	A	A	A	A	A	A	0 / 2	1–2	33%
Miami	A	1R	2R	2R	1R	1R	3R	A	1R	A	A	0 / 7	4–7	36%
Monte Carlo	A	A	A	A	QF	A	SF	1R	A	A	Q1	0 / 3	5–3	63%
Hamburg	A	A	SF	A	QF	A	1R	1R	1R	A	A	0 / 5	5–5	50%
Rome	QF	A	A	2R	QF	A	2R	2R	1R	A	A	0 / 6	7–6	54%
Canada	A	A	A	A	A	A	A	A	1R	A	A	0 / 1	0–1	0%
Cincinnati	A	A	A	A	1R	1R	A	A	A	A	A	0 / 2	0–2	0%
Win–loss	2–1	0–1	4–3	3–3	6–5	0–2	6–4	1–3	0–4	0–0	0–0	0 / 26	22–26	46%

=== Mixed Doubles ===
Tournament	1986	1987	1988	1989	1990	1991	1992	SR	W–L	Win %
Grand Slam Tournaments
Australian Open	A	1R	2R	1R	A	A	A	0 / 3	1–3	25%
French Open	1R	SF	F	2R	QF	1R	1R	0 / 7	13–7	65%
Wimbledon	A	1R	1R	2R	A	QF	3R	0 / 5	6–5	55%
US Open	A	QF	1R	A	A	1R	A	0 / 3	2–3	40%
Win–loss	0–1	6–4	6–4	2–3	3–1	3–3	2–2	0 / 18	22–18	55%
