= 1986 Italian Open (tennis) =

- Date: 12–18 May
- Edition: 43rd
- Category: Grand Prix
- Draw: 64S / 32D
- Prize money: $350,000
- Surface: Clay / outdoor
- Location: Rome, Italy
- Venue: Foro Italico

Champions

Singles
- (Czechoslovakia) Ivan Lendl

Doubles
- (France) Guy Forget / (France) Yannick Noah
- Italian Open

The 1986 Italian Open was a men's tennis tournament played on outdoor clay courts at the Foro Italico in Rome in Italy that was part of the 1986 Nabisco Grand Prix. The men's tournament was held from 12 May until 18 May 1986, while the women's tournament was not held this year. First-seeded Ivan Lendl won the singles title.

== Finals ==
=== Singles ===
(Czechoslovakia) Ivan Lendl defeated (Spain) Emilio Sánchez 7–5, 4–6, 6–1, 6–1

- It was Lendl's 5th singles title of the year and the 58th of his career.

=== Doubles ===
(France) Guy Forget / (France) Yannick Noah defeated (Australia) Mark Edmondson / (United States) Sherwood Stewart 7–6, 6–2
