= 1985 Grand Prix German Open (tennis) =

Tennis tournament

- Date: 29 April – 5 May
- Edition: 77th
- Category: Grand Prix
- Draw: 56S / 28D
- Prize money: $250,000
- Surface: Clay / outdoor
- Location: Hamburg, West Germany
- Venue: Am Rothenbaum

Champions

Singles
- (Czechoslovakia) Miloslav Mečíř

Doubles
- (Chile) Hans Gildemeister / (Ecuador) Andrés Gómez
- Grand Prix German Open

The 1985 Grand Prix German Open (also known as the 1985 Ebel German Open for sponsorship reasons) was a men's tennis tournament played on outdoor red clay courts. It was the 77th edition of the event. It took place at the Am Rothenbaum in Hamburg, West Germany, from 29 April through 5 May 1985. Ninth-seeded Miloslav Mečíř won the singles title and earned $45,500 first-prize money.

== Finals ==
=== Singles ===
(Czechoslovakia) Miloslav Mečíř defeated (Sweden) Henrik Sundström, 6–4, 6–1, 6-4

- It was Mečíř's 2nd singles title of the year and of his career.

=== Doubles ===
(Chile) Hans Gildemeister / (Ecuador) Andrés Gómez defeated (Switzerland) Heinz Günthardt / (Hungary) Balázs Taróczy, 6–4, 6–3
