= Thierry Tulasne =

French tennis player (born 1963)

- Country (sports): France
- Born: 12 July 1963 (age 62); Aix-les-Bains, France
- Height: 1.77 m (5 ft 9 1/2 in)
- Plays: Right-handed (one-handed backhand)
- Prize money: $1,058,412

Singles
- Career record: 228–222
- Career titles: 5
- Highest ranking: No. 10 (4 August 1986)

Grand Slam singles results
- Australian Open: 2R (1981)
- French Open: 4R (1981, 1989)
- Wimbledon: 2R (1982)
- US Open: 3R (1980, 1985)

Other tournaments
- WCT Finals: 1R (1986)

Doubles
- Career record: 38–78
- Career titles: 0
- Highest ranking: No. 112 (28 April 1992)

Thierry Tulasne
- Career record: 227–222
- Career record: 38–78

Coaching career (1995–)
- Sébastien Grosjean 2002–2004; Paul-Henri Mathieu 2000–2006; Gilles Simon 2007–2012

Coaching achievements
- Coachee singles titles total: 7 (S)- 1 (G) – 2 (M)
- Coachee(s) doubles titles total: 2 (G)
- List of notable tournaments (with champion) 2004 Indian Wells Masters (Grosjean doubles)

Coaching awards and records
- Records 2002 ATP Newcomer of the Year (Matthieu)

Thierry Tulasne (French: [tjɛʁi tylɑn]; born 12 July 1963) is a former tennis player from France, who won five singles titles during his professional career. He reached his career-high ATP singles ranking of World No. 10 in August 1986. Since his retirement, he has coached players such as Sébastien Grosjean, Paul-Henri Mathieu, Gilles Simon and Harold Mayot.

== Career finals ==
=== Singles (5 titles, 4 runner-ups) ===
Legend (singles)
Grand Slam (0)
Tennis Masters Cup (0)
ATP Tour (5)

Result	W/L	Date	Tournament	Surface	Opponent	Score
Win	1–0	Jul 1981	Båstad, Sweden	Clay	(Sweden) Anders Järryd	6–2, 6–3
Loss	1–1	Sep 1981	Bordeaux, France	Clay	(Ecuador) Andrés Gómez	6–7, 6–7, 1–6
Win	2–1	Jun 1985	Bologna, Italy	Clay	(Italy) Claudio Panatta	6–2, 6–0
Win	3–1	Sep 1985	Palermo, Italy	Clay	(Sweden) Joakim Nyström	6–2, 6–0
Win	4–1	Sep 1985	Barcelona, Spain	Clay	(Sweden) Mats Wilander	0–6, 6–2, 3–6, 6–4, 6–0
Win	5–1	Feb 1986	Metz, France	Indoor	(Australia) Broderick Dyke	6–4, 6–3
Loss	5–2	Apr 1986	Indianapolis, U.S.	Clay	(Ecuador) Andrés Gómez	4–6, 6–7^{(1–7)}
Loss	5–3	Jul 1986	Washington, D.C., U.S.	Clay	(Czechoslovakia) Karel Nováček	1–6, 6–7^{(4–7)}
Loss	5–4	Sep 1986	Geneva, Switzerland	Clay	(France) Henri Leconte	5–7, 3–6
