= Ulf Stenlund =

Swedish tennis player

- Country (sports): Sweden
- Born: 21 January 1967 (age 59) Falun, Sweden
- Height: 1.80 m (5 ft 11 in)
- Turned pro: 1986
- Retired: 1998
- Plays: Right-handed
- Prize money: $274,501

Singles
- Career record: 52–44
- Career titles: 1
- Highest ranking: No. 23 (27 April 1987)

Grand Slam singles results
- French Open: 4R (1986)
- Wimbledon: 2R (1986, 1987)
- US Open: 1R (1986, 1987)

Doubles
- Career record: 6–14
- Career titles: 1
- Highest ranking: No. 229 (4 May 1987)

Grand Slam doubles results
- US Open: 2R (1986)

Ulf Stenlund (born 21 January 1967) is a former tennis player from Sweden, who won one single (1986, Palermo) and one doubles (1987, Bari) title during his professional career. The right-hander reached his career-high ATP singles ranking of world No. 23 in April 1987.

== Career finals ==
=== Singles (1 title) ===
Result	W/L	Date	Tournament	Surface	Opponent	Score
Win	1–0	Sep 1986	Palermo, Italy	Clay	(Peru) Pablo Arraya	6–2, 6–3

=== Doubles (1 title) ===
Result	W/L	Date	Tournament	Surface	Partner	Opponents	Score
Win	1–0	Apr 1987	Bari, Italy	Clay	(Sweden) Christer Allgårdh	(Argentina) Roberto Azar (Argentina) Marcelo Ingaramo	6–3, 6–3
