= 1985 Bordeaux Open – Singles =

Singles
- 1985 Bordeaux Open

Final
- Champion: (Uruguay) Diego Pérez
- Runner-up: (United States) Jimmy Brown
- Score: 6–4, 7–6

Details
- Draw: 32 (3WC/4Q)
- Seeds: 8

Events
Singles	Doubles
← 1984 ·	ATP Bordeaux	· 1986 →

José Higueras was the defending champion, but lost in the first round to Loïc Courteau.

Diego Pérez won the title by defeating Jimmy Brown 6–4, 7–6 in the final.

== Seeds ==
1. (Argentina) José Luis Clerc (semifinals)
2. (Czechoslovakia) Libor Pimek (quarterfinals)
3. (United States) Lawson Duncan (second round)
4. (United States) Jimmy Brown (final)
5. (Uruguay) Diego Pérez (champion)
6. (Haiti) Ronald Agénor (quarterfinals)
7. (France) Thierry Tulasne (semifinals)
8. (Socialist Federal Republic of Yugoslavia) Bruno Orešar (second round)

== Draw ==
=== Key ===
- Q = Qualifier
- WC = Wild card
- LL = Lucky loser
- Alt = Alternate
- SE = Special exempt
- PR = Protected ranking
- ITF = ITF entry
- JE = Junior exempt
- w/o = Walkover
- r = Retired
- d = Defaulted
- SR = Special ranking

=== Finals ===
Semifinals
1	(Argentina) José Luis Clerc	7	3	1
4	(United States) Jimmy Brown	6	6	6
5	(Uruguay) Diego Pérez	2	6	6
7	(France) Thierry Tulasne	6	3	2

Final
4	(United States) Jimmy Brown	4	6
5	(Uruguay) Diego Pérez	6	7

=== Top half ===
First round
1	(Argentina) JL Clerc	7	7
Q	(Sweden) P Lindgren	6	6
(United Kingdom) S Shaw	6	2	6
Q	(France) JP Fleurian	3	6	1
(Canada) M Wostenholme	6	0	3
(Netherlands) H van Boeckel	3	6	6
(Spain) G Urpí	4	1
6	(Haiti) R Agénor	6	6
4	(United States) J Brown	6	2	7
(Spain) J Avendaño	1	6	5
(United States) B Willenborg	6	6
(Spain) J Arrese	2	1
(Paraguay) V Pecci	3	2
Q	(Spain) J Bardou	6	6
WC	(Romania) I Năstase	4	2
8	(Socialist Federal Republic of Yugoslavia) B Orešar	6	6

Second round
1	(Argentina) JL Clerc	6	7
(United Kingdom) S Shaw	1	5
(Netherlands) H van Boeckel	4	7	0
6	(Haiti) R Agénor	6	6	6
4	(United States) J Brown	7	6
(United States) B Willenborg	6	0
Q	(Spain) J Bardou	6	6
8	(Socialist Federal Republic of Yugoslavia) B Orešar	3	4

Quarterfinals
1	(Argentina) JL Clerc	6	6
6	(Haiti) R Agénor	2	4
4	(United States) J Brown	6	6
Q	(Spain) J Bardou	2	2

Semifinals
1	(Argentina) JL Clerc	7	3	1
4	(United States) J Brown	6	6	6

=== Bottom half ===
First round
5	(Uruguay) D Pérez	6	6
(Republic of Ireland) M Doyle	3	3
(Brazil) D Campos	3	0
WC	(France) B Dadillon	6	6
Q	(Australia) W Masur	3	5
(Mexico) F Maciel	6	7
(Australia) C Limberger	6	3	4
3	(United States) L Duncan	4	6	6
7	(France) T Tulasne	6	6
(Ecuador) R Viver	1	2
(Spain) D de Miguel	6	6
(Sweden) S Eriksson	2	2
WC	(France) L Courteau	2	6	6
(Spain) J Higueras	6	2	4
(Spain) A Tous	6	4	4
2	(Czechoslovakia) L Pimek	1	6	6

Second round
5	(Uruguay) D Pérez	6	6
WC	(France) B Dadillon	4	1
(Mexico) F Maciel	6	6
3	(United States) L Duncan	1	3
7	(France) T Tulasne	6	6
(Spain) D de Miguel	1	1
WC	(France) L Courteau	6	0
2	(Czechoslovakia) L Pimek	7	6

Quarterfinals
5	(Uruguay) D Pérez	6	6
(Mexico) F Maciel	3	3
7	(France) T Tulasne	6	6
2	(Czechoslovakia) L Pimek	1	1

Semifinals
5	(Uruguay) D Pérez	2	6	6
7	(France) T Tulasne	6	3	2
