= 1985 Bordeaux Open – Doubles =

Doubles
- 1985 Bordeaux Open

Final
- Champions: (United Kingdom) David Felgate (United Kingdom) Steve Shaw
- Runners-up: (Czechoslovakia) Libor Pimek (United States) Blaine Willenborg
- Score: 6–4, 5–7, 6–4

Details
- Draw: 16
- Seeds: 4

Events
Singles	Doubles
← 1984 ·	ATP Bordeaux	· 1986 →

Pavel Složil and Blaine Willenborg were the defending champions, but Složil chose to compete at Geneva during the same week, losing in the first round.

Willenborg teamed up with Libor Pimek and lost in the final to David Felgate and Steve Shaw. The score was 6–4, 5–7, 6–4.

== Seeds ==
1. (Czechoslovakia) Libor Pimek / (United States) Blaine Willenborg (final)
2. (Argentina) José Luis Clerc / (Romania) Ilie Năstase (quarterfinals)
3. (Australia) Russell Barlow / (Australia) Carl Limberger (semifinals)
4. (United Kingdom) David Felgate / (United Kingdom) Steve Shaw (champions)

== Draw ==
=== Key ===
- Q = Qualifier
- WC = Wild card
- LL = Lucky loser
- Alt = Alternate
- SE = Special exempt
- PR = Protected ranking
- ITF = ITF entry
- JE = Junior exempt
- w/o = Walkover
- r = Retired
- d = Defaulted
- SR = Special ranking

=== Draw ===
First round
1	(Czechoslovakia) L Pimek (United States) B Willenborg	6	6
(Argentina) G Garetto (Australia) J Stoddart	1	2
(France) JP Fleurian (France) É Winogradsky	4	6
(Sweden) S Eriksson (Canada) M Wostenholme	6	7
3	(Australia) R Barlow (Australia) C Limberger	6	6	6
(Mexico) J Contreras (Mexico) G Stevens	7	3	0
(France) David Bétous (Monaco) Eric Carlier	3	4
(France) B Dadillon (France) T Pham	6	6
(France) L Courteau (France) T Tulasne	6	6
(Haiti) R Agénor (Spain) J Arrese	0	3
(Spain) J Higueras (Spain) G Urpí	6	4
4	(United Kingdom) D Felgate (United Kingdom) S Shaw	7	6
(Iran) M Bahrami (Uruguay) D Pérez	1	6	7
(Republic of Ireland) M Doyle (Netherlands) H van Boeckel	6	3	9
(France) Xavier Lemoine (France) P Torre	0	2
2	(Argentina) JL Clerc (Romania) I Năstase	6	6

Quarterfinals
1	(Czechoslovakia) L Pimek (United States) B Willenborg	6	2	6
(Sweden) S Eriksson (Canada) M Wostenholme	2	6	0
3	(Australia) R Barlow (Australia) C Limberger	6	6
(France) B Dadillon (France) T Pham	4	4
(France) L Courteau (France) T Tulasne	4	5
4	(United Kingdom) D Felgate (United Kingdom) S Shaw	6	7
(Republic of Ireland) M Doyle (Netherlands) H van Boeckel	6	4	6
2	(Argentina) JL Clerc (Romania) I Năstase	4	6	3

Semifinals
1	(Czechoslovakia) L Pimek (United States) B Willenborg	6	7
3	(Australia) R Barlow (Australia) C Limberger	1	6
4	(United Kingdom) D Felgate (United Kingdom) S Shaw	6	7
(Republic of Ireland) M Doyle (Netherlands) H van Boeckel	4	6

Final
1	(Czechoslovakia) L Pimek (United States) B Willenborg	4	7	4
4	(United Kingdom) D Felgate (United Kingdom) S Shaw	6	5	6
