= 1986 French Open – Men's doubles =

Men's doubles
- 1986 French Open

Final
- Champion: (Australia) John Fitzgerald (Czechoslovakia) Tomáš Šmíd
- Runner-up: (Sweden) Stefan Edberg (Sweden) Anders Järryd
- Score: 6–3, 4–6, 6–3, 6–7^{(4–7)}, 14–12

Details
- Draw: 64
- Seeds: 16

Events
Singles	men	women		boys	girls
Doubles	men	women	mixed	boys	girls
WC Singles	men	women	quad
WC Doubles	men	women	quad
Legends	−45	45+	women
← 1985 ·	French Open	· 1987 →

The men's doubles tournament at the 1986 French Open was held from 26 May until 8 June 1986 on the outdoor clay courts at the Stade Roland Garros in Paris, France. John Fitzgerald and Tomáš Šmíd won the title, defeating Stefan Edberg and Anders Järryd in the final.

== Seeds ==
1. (United States) Ken Flach / (United States) Robert Seguso (quarterfinals)
2. (Sweden) Stefan Edberg / (Sweden) Anders Järryd (final)
3. (Chile) Hans Gildemeister / (Ecuador) Andrés Gómez (second round)
4. (Australia) Mark Edmondson / (Australia) Kim Warwick (first round)
5. (United States) Peter Fleming / (France) Guy Forget (third round)
6. (Australia) John Fitzgerald / (Czechoslovakia) Tomáš Šmíd (champions)
7. (Switzerland) Heinz Günthardt / (Australia) Paul McNamee (semifinals)
8. (Israel) Shlomo Glickstein / (Sweden) Hans Simonsson (second round)
9. (Spain) Sergio Casal / (Spain) Emilio Sánchez (quarterfinals)
10. (United States) Mike De Palmer / (United States) Gary Donnelly (second round)
11. (France) Henri Leconte / (United States) Sherwood Stewart (semifinals)
12. (Switzerland) Jakob Hlasek / (Czechoslovakia) Pavel Složil (second round)
13. (Sweden) Jan Gunnarsson / (Denmark) Michael Mortensen (second round)
14. (United States) Johan Kriek / (United Kingdom) John Lloyd (quarterfinals)
15. (South Africa) Eddie Edwards / (Paraguay) Francisco González (first round)
16. (United States) Sammy Giammalva / (United States) Tim Wilkison (first round)

== Draw ==
=== Key ===
- Q = Qualifier
- WC = Wild card
- LL = Lucky loser
- Alt = Alternate
- ITF = ITF entry
- PR = Protected ranking
- SR = Special ranking
- SE = Special exempt
- JE = Junior exempt
- JR = Junior Accelerator Programme entrant
- CO = College Accelerator Programme entrant
- NG = Next Gen Accelerator Program entrant
- w/o = Walkover
- r = Retired
- d = Defaulted

=== Finals ===
Quarterfinals
1	(United States) Ken Flach (United States) Robert Seguso	2	1
7	(Switzerland) Heinz Günthardt (Australia) Paul McNamee	6	6
14	(United States) Johan Kriek (United Kingdom) John Lloyd	0	3
6	(Australia) John Fitzgerald (Czechoslovakia) Tomáš Šmíd	6	6
11	(France) Henri Leconte (United States) Sherwood Stewart	7	6
(Czech Republic) Jaroslav Navrátil (Netherlands) Michiel Schapers	6	4
9	(Spain) Sergio Casal (Spain) Emilio Sánchez	4	2
2	(Sweden) Stefan Edberg (Sweden) Anders Järryd	6	6

Semifinals
7	(Switzerland) Heinz Günthardt (Australia) Paul McNamee	3	6	2	6	6
6	(Australia) John Fitzgerald (Czechoslovakia) Tomáš Šmíd	6	3	6	4	8
11	(France) Henri Leconte (United States) Sherwood Stewart	6	3	5
2	(Sweden) Stefan Edberg (Sweden) Anders Järryd	7	6	7

Final
6	(Australia) John Fitzgerald (Czechoslovakia) Tomáš Šmíd	6	4	6	6^{4}	14
2	(Sweden) Stefan Edberg (Sweden) Anders Järryd	3	6	3	7	12

=== Top half ===
==== Section 1 ====
First round
1	(United States) K Flach (United States) R Seguso	7	6
(United Kingdom) J Bates (United Kingdom) S Shaw	6	4
(India) A Amritraj (United States) K Richter	6	3	5
(Italy) S Colombo (Switzerland) C Mezzadri	3	6	7
(Israel) A Mansdorf (Israel) S Perkiss	6	2
(Australia) L Warder (Australia) S Youl	7	6
(South Africa) M Robertson (United States) T Warneke	7	6
16	(United States) S Giammalva (United States) T Wilkison	5	3
10	(United States) M De Palmer (United States) G Donnelly	6	6
(Sweden) S Eriksson (Sweden) J Svensson	3	2
(Australia) D Graham (Paraguay) V Pecci	5	7	3
(Mexico) J Lozano (United States) T Witsken	7	5	6
(Mexico) R Ramírez (United States) D Stockton	4	6
(Australia) D Cahill (Australia) M Kratzmann	6	7
(South Africa) C Steyn (South Africa) D Visser	3	6	3
7	(Switzerland) H Günthardt (Australia) P McNamee	6	3	6

Second round
1	(United States) K Flach (United States) R Seguso	6	7
(Italy) S Colombo (Switzerland) C Mezzadri	2	6
(Australia) L Warder (Australia) S Youl	1	4
(South Africa) M Robertson (United States) T Warneke	6	6
10	(United States) M De Palmer (United States) G Donnelly	6	5
(Mexico) J Lozano (United States) T Witsken	7	7
(Australia) D Cahill (Australia) M Kratzmann	3	6	4
7	(Switzerland) H Günthardt (Australia) P McNamee	6	4	6

Third round
1	(United States) K Flach (United States) R Seguso	6	6
(South Africa) M Robertson (United States) T Warneke	4	2
(Mexico) J Lozano (United States) T Witsken	6	6
7	(Switzerland) H Günthardt (Australia) P McNamee	7	7

Quarterfinals
1	(United States) K Flach (United States) R Seguso	2	1
7	(Switzerland) H Günthardt (Australia) P McNamee	6	6

==== Section 2 ====
First round
3	(Chile) H Gildemeister (Ecuador) A Gómez	7	6
(United States) M Freeman (Netherlands) M Oosting	6	4
(Australia) B Dyke (Australia) W Masur	6	6
(Poland) W Fibak (Italy) C Panatta	2	1
(United States) M Davis (Australia) B Drewett	7	2	2
(United Kingdom) C Dowdeswell (Italy) G Ocleppo	5	6	6
(France) T Tulasne (France) E Winogradsky	7	4	4
14	(United States) J Kriek (United Kingdom) J Lloyd	6	6	6
12	(Switzerland) J Hlasek (Czechoslovakia) P Složil	6	6
(Brazil) D Campos (Brazil) J Góes	1	2
(Australia) A Emerson (West Germany) H Rittersbacher	4	3
(Argentina) G Luza (Argentina) G Tiberti	6	6
(United States) B Cox (Australia) M Fancutt	6	7
(United States) B Buffington (Republic of Ireland) M Doyle	3	5
(Switzerland) S Medem (United States) C Strode	2	4
6	(Australia) J Fitzgerald (Czechoslovakia) T Šmíd	6	6

Second round
3	(Chile) H Gildemeister (Ecuador) A Gómez	4	6	4
(Australia) B Dyke (Australia) W Masur	6	3	6
(United Kingdom) C Dowdeswell (Italy) G Ocleppo	6	6
14	(United States) J Kriek (United Kingdom) J Lloyd	7	7
12	(Switzerland) J Hlasek (Czechoslovakia) P Složil	6	3
(Argentina) G Luza (Argentina) G Tiberti	7	6
(United States) B Cox (Australia) M Fancutt	3	7	1
6	(Australia) J Fitzgerald (Czechoslovakia) T Šmíd	6	6	6

Third round
(Australia) B Dyke (Australia) W Masur	6	2	6
14	(United States) J Kriek (United Kingdom) J Lloyd	4	6	8
(Argentina) G Luza (Argentina) G Tiberti	3	3
6	(Australia) J Fitzgerald (Czechoslovakia) T Šmíd	6	6

Quarterfinals
14	(United States) J Kriek (United Kingdom) J Lloyd	0	3
6	(Australia) J Fitzgerald (Czechoslovakia) T Šmíd	6	6

=== Bottom half ===
==== Section 3 ====
First round
5	(United States) P Fleming (France) G Forget	6	6
(Haiti) R Agénor (Mexico) F Maciel	3	4
WC	(France) B Dadillon (France) T Pham	6	6
(Sweden) P Carlsson (Finland) O Rahnasto	3	4
WC	(Czechoslovakia) L Pimek (United States) B Willenborg	3	6	3
(Sweden) M Tideman (Australia) M Woodforde	6	3	6
WC	(France) T Champion (France) L Courteau	3	5
11	(France) H Leconte (United States) S Stewart	6	7
13	(Sweden) J Gunnarsson (Denmark) M Mortensen	6	6
(Spain) J Colas (Spain) D de Miguel	4	4
(Czechoslovakia) J Navrátil (Netherlands) M Schapers	1	6	6
(Brazil) G Barbosa (Brazil) I Kley	6	4	1
(Brazil) N Aerts (Brazil) L Mattar	7	6
(Spain) J Arrese (Spain) J Bardou	6	4
(Chile) R Acuña (Mexico) L Lavalle	7	7
4	(Australia) M Edmondson (Australia) K Warwick	6	6

Second round
5	(United States) P Fleming (France) G Forget	7	7
(France) B Dadillon (France) T Pham	6	1
(Sweden) M Tideman (Australia) M Woodforde	1	^{r}
11	(France) H Leconte (United States) S Stewart	6
13	(Sweden) J Gunnarsson (Denmark) M Mortensen	6	2	1
(Czechoslovakia) J Navrátil (Netherlands) M Schapers	1	6	6
(Brazil) N Aerts (Brazil) L Mattar	6	7
(Chile) R Acuña (Mexico) L Lavalle	3	6

Third round
5	(United States) P Fleming (France) G Forget	6	6
11	(France) H Leconte (United States) S Stewart	7	7
(Czechoslovakia) J Navrátil (Netherlands) M Schapers	6	4	6
(Brazil) N Aerts (Brazil) L Mattar	4	6	3

Quarterfinals
11	(France) H Leconte (United States) S Stewart	7	6
(Czechoslovakia) J Navrátil (Netherlands) M Schapers	6	4

==== Section 4 ====
First round
8	(Israel) S Glickstein (Sweden) H Simonsson	7	6
WC	(France) F Errard (France) J Potier	5	3
(Sweden) P Lundgren (Sweden) M Pernfors	7	3	5
WC	(France) T Benhabiles (France) JP Fleurian	5	6	7
(New Zealand) B Derlin (United Kingdom) D Felgate	3	3
(Netherlands) T Nijssen (Netherlands) J Vekemans	6	6
(United States) D Dowlen (United States) B Schultz	4	6
9	(Spain) S Casal (Spain) E Sánchez	6	7
15	(South Africa) E Edwards (Paraguay) F González	7	4	5
(Spain) JM Clavet (Argentina) G Guerrero	6	6	7
(South Africa) C Campbell (United States) C Wittus	6	5	5
(United States) G Layendecker (Canada) G Michibata	2	7	7
(Peru) C di Laura (United States) J Pugh	7	7	7
(Brazil) J Soares (Switzerland) J Srnensky	5	6
(Brazil) C Kirmayr (Brazil) C Motta	3	4
2	(Sweden) S Edberg (Sweden) A Järryd	6	6

Second round
8	(Israel) S Glickstein (Sweden) H Simonsson	4	4
WC	(France) T Benhabiles (France) JP Fleurian	6	6
(Netherlands) T Nijssen (Netherlands) J Vekemans	3	2
9	(Spain) S Casal (Spain) E Sánchez	6	6
(Spain) JM Clavet (Argentina) G Guerrero	3	1
(United States) G Layendecker (Canada) G Michibata	6	6
(Peru) C di Laura (United States) J Pugh	3	2
2	(Sweden) S Edberg (Sweden) A Järryd	6	6

Third round
WC	(France) T Benhabiles (France) JP Fleurian	3	6	1
9	(Spain) S Casal (Spain) E Sánchez	6	3	6
(United States) G Layendecker (Canada) G Michibata	2	3
2	(Sweden) S Edberg (Sweden) A Järryd	6	6

Quarterfinals
9	(Spain) S Casal (Spain) E Sánchez	4	2
2	(Sweden) S Edberg (Sweden) A Järryd	6	6
