= 1986 Bordeaux Open – Doubles =

Doubles
- 1986 Bordeaux Open

Final
- Champions: (Spain) Jordi Arrese (Spain) David de Miguel
- Runners-up: (Haiti) Ronald Agénor (Iran) Mansour Bahrami
- Score: 7–5, 6–4

Details
- Draw: 16 (1WC)
- Seeds: 4

Events
Singles	Doubles
← 1985 ·	ATP Bordeaux	· 1987 →

David Felgate and Steve Shaw were the defending champions, but Shaw did not compete this year. Felgate teamed up with Henrik Sundström and lost in the first round to Bruno Dadillon and Thierry Pham.

Jordi Arrese and David de Miguel won the title by defeating Ronald Agénor and Mansour Bahrami 7–5, 6–4 in the final.

== Seeds ==
1. (Italy) Paolo Canè / (Italy) Simone Colombo (first round)
2. (New Zealand) Bruce Derlin / (Czechoslovakia) Libor Pimek (semifinals)
3. (Australia) Laurie Warder / (Australia) Mark Woodforde (first round)
4. (Spain) Jordi Arrese / (Spain) David de Miguel (champions)

== Draw ==
=== Key ===
- Q = Qualifier
- WC = Wild card
- LL = Lucky loser
- Alt = Alternate
- SE = Special exempt
- PR = Protected ranking
- ITF = ITF entry
- JE = Junior exempt
- w/o = Walkover
- r = Retired
- d = Defaulted
- SR = Special ranking

=== Draw ===
First round
1	(Italy) P Canè (Italy) S Colombo	4	6	3
(Belgium) E Masso (Italy) C Pistolesi	6	1	6
(Haiti) R Agénor (Iran) M Bahrami	6	6
WC	(France) T Champion (France) L Courteau	4	3
3	(Australia) L Warder (Australia) M Woodforde	3	6	9
(Netherlands) M Oosting (Australia) D Tyson	6	4	11
(Spain) J López-Maeso (Uruguay) D Pérez	6	7
(United States) R Baxter (United States) J Rive	4	5
(France) B Dadillon (France) T Pham	6	6
(United Kingdom) D Felgate (Sweden) H Sundström	3	4
(France) T Tulasne (France) É Winogradsky	2	3
4	(Spain) J Arrese (Spain) D de Miguel	6	6
(France) T Benhabiles (France) J Potier	6	4	11
(Italy) F Cancellotti (Switzerland) C Mezzadri	3	6	9
(Sweden) R Båthman (Sweden) U Stenlund	4	2
2	(New Zealand) B Derlin (Czechoslovakia) L Pimek	6	6

Quarterfinals
(Belgium) E Masso (Italy) C Pistolesi	6	2	2
(Haiti) R Agénor (Iran) M Bahrami	3	6	6
(Netherlands) M Oosting (Australia) D Tyson	6	2	6
(Spain) J López-Maeso (Uruguay) D Pérez	3	6	4
(France) B Dadillon (France) T Pham	6	3
4	(Spain) J Arrese (Spain) D de Miguel	7	6
(France) T Benhabiles (France) J Potier	6	5	3
2	(New Zealand) B Derlin (Czechoslovakia) L Pimek	1	7	6

Semifinals
(Haiti) R Agénor (Iran) M Bahrami	7	6
(Netherlands) M Oosting (Australia) D Tyson	6	3
4	(Spain) J Arrese (Spain) D de Miguel	6	7
2	(New Zealand) B Derlin (Czechoslovakia) L Pimek	4	6

Final
(Haiti) R Agénor (Iran) M Bahrami	5	4
4	(Spain) J Arrese (Spain) D de Miguel	7	6
