= 1986 French Open – Mixed doubles =

Mixed doubles
- 1986 French Open

Final
- Champion: (United States) Kathy Jordan (United States) Ken Flach
- Runner-up: (South Africa) Rosalyn Fairbank (Australia) Mark Edmondson
- Score: 3–6, 7–6^{(7–3)}, 6–3

Details
- Draw: 64

Events
| Singles | men | women | | boys | girls |
| Doubles | men | women | mixed | boys | girls |
| WC Singles | men | women | quad |
| WC Doubles | men | women | quad |
| Legends | −45 | 45+ | women |
- French Open

The mixed doubles tournament at the 1986 French Open was held from 26 May until 8 June 1986 on the outdoor clay courts at the Stade Roland Garros in Paris, France. Kathy Jordan and Ken Flach won the title, defeating Rosalyn Fairbank and Mark Edmondson in the final.

== Draw ==
Key

- Q = Qualifier
- WC = Wild card
- LL = Lucky loser
- Alt = Alternate
- ITF = ITF entry
- PR = Protected ranking
- SR = Special ranking
- SE = Special exempt
- JE = Junior exempt
- JR = Junior Accelerator Programme entrant
- CO = College Accelerator Programme entrant
- NG = Next Gen Accelerator Program entrant
- w/o = Walkover
- r = Retired
- d = Defaulted

=== Finals ===
Quarterfinals
(United States) Ken Flach (United States) Kathy Jordan | 6 | 7
(United States) Martin Davis (United States) Robin White | 4 | 5
(Ecuador) Raúl Viver (Argentina) Mariana Pérez Roldán | 2 | 3
(Spain) Sergio Casal (Italy) Raffaella Reggi | 6 | 6
(Brazil) Dácio Campos (Czechoslovakia) Regina Maršíková | 2 | 2
(Australia) Mark Edmondson (South Africa) Rosalyn Fairbank | 6 | 6
(Mexico) Jorge Lozano (United States) Beth Herr | 7 | 6
(Switzerland) Heinz Günthardt (United States) Martina Navratilova | 6 | 3

Semifinals
(United States) Ken Flach (United States) Kathy Jordan | 6 | 6
(Spain) Sergio Casal (Italy) Raffaella Reggi | 0 | 3
(Australia) Mark Edmondson (South Africa) Rosalyn Fairbank | 4 | 7 | 6
(Mexico) Jorge Lozano (United States) Beth Herr | 6 | 5 | 3

Final
(United States) Ken Flach (United States) Kathy Jordan | 3 | 7 | 6
(Australia) Mark Edmondson (South Africa) Rosalyn Fairbank | 6 | 6^{3} | 3

=== Top half ===
==== Section 1 ====
First round
(United States) K Flach (United States) K Jordan | 6 | 6
(Switzerland) S Medem (United States) L McNeil | 1 | 4
(United States) T Witsken (United States) AM Fernandez | 6 | 6
(Chile) P Rebolledo (Chile) N Rodríguez | 4 | 2
(Argentina) H de la Peña (Argentina) M Paz | 6 | 7
(Australia) M Woodforde (Australia) J Tremelling | 3 | 5
(West Germany) T Meinecke (Austria) P Huber | 4 | 1
(Denmark) M Mortensen (Denmark) T Scheuer-Larsen | 6 | 6
(Australia) B Carmichael (Netherlands) B Stöve | 3 | 7 | 2
(United Kingdom) D Felgate (France) P Etchemendy | 6 | 5 | 6
(Brazil) C Motta (Brazil) C Monteiro | 7 | 7
(Hungary) A Lányi (Hungary) A Temesvári | 5 | 6
(United States) G Donnelly (United States) S Rimes | 2 | 3
(Spain) M Orantes (Spain) A Sánchez Vicario | 6 | 6
(Israel) S Perkiss (New Zealand) J Richardson | 6 | 4 | 5
(United States) M Davis (United States) R White | 4 | 6 | 7

Second round
(United States) K Flach (United States) K Jordan | 2 | 6 | 9
(United States) T Witsken (United States) AM Fernandez | 6 | 4 | 7
(Argentina) H de la Peña (Argentina) M Paz | 3 | 4
(Denmark) M Mortensen (Denmark) T Scheuer-Larsen | 6 | 6
(United Kingdom) D Felgate (France) P Etchemendy | 1 | 2
(Brazil) C Motta (Brazil) C Monteiro | 6 | 6
(Spain) M Orantes (Spain) A Sánchez Vicario | 4 | 5
(United States) M Davis (United States) R White | 6 | 7

Third round
(United States) K Flach (United States) K Jordan | 3 | 7 | 7
(Denmark) M Mortensen (Denmark) T Scheuer-Larsen | 6 | 6 | 5
(Brazil) C Motta (Brazil) C Monteiro | 4 | 2
(United States) M Davis (United States) R White | 6 | 6

Quarterfinals
(United States) K Flach (United States) K Jordan | 6 | 7
(United States) M Davis (United States) R White | 4 | 5

==== Section 2 ====
First round
(United States) S Stewart (United States) E Burgin | 1 | 6
(United States) B Cox (United States) G Rush | 6 | 7
(Spain) J Sánchez (United States) J Goodling | 6 | 6
(Brazil) I Kley (Brazil) N Dias | 3 | 3
(Ecuador) R Viver (Argentina) M Pérez Roldán | 6 | 7
(Netherlands) M Schapers (Switzerland) C Jolissaint | 3 | 6
(United Kingdom) J Feaver (France) E Derly | 4 | 6 | 4
(Australia) D Graham (Canada) J Hetherington | 6 | 2 | 6
(United States) B Schultz (United States) A White | 7 | 6
(Paraguay) V Pecci (United States) A Holton | 5 | 2
(Peru) J Yzaga (United States) L Bonder | 6 | 3
(France) É Winogradsky (France) N Herreman | 7 | 6
(France) B Dadillon (France) C Calmette | 7 | 4 | 3
(Canada) G Michibata (United States) C Benjamin | 5 | 6 | 6
(Peru) C di Laura (Chile) P Rodriguez | 3 | 1
(Spain) S Casal (Italy) R Reggi | 6 | 6

Second round
(United States) B Cox (United States) G Rush | 6 | 6
(Spain) J Sánchez (United States) J Goodling | 2 | 4
(Ecuador) R Viver (Argentina) M Pérez Roldán | 4 | 7 | 6
(Australia) D Graham (Canada) J Hetherington | 6 | 5 | 3
(United States) B Schultz (United States) A White | 4 | 4
(France) É Winogradsky (France) N Herreman | 6 | 6
(Canada) G Michibata (United States) C Benjamin
(Spain) S Casal (Italy) R Reggi | w/o

Third round
(United States) B Cox (United States) G Rush | 3 | 6 | 4
(Ecuador) R Viver (Argentina) M Pérez Roldán | 6 | 4 | 6
(France) É Winogradsky (France) N Herreman | 5 | 3
(Spain) S Casal (Italy) R Reggi | 7 | 6

Quarterfinals
(Ecuador) R Viver (Argentina) M Pérez Roldán | 2 | 3
(Spain) S Casal (Italy) R Reggi | 6 | 6

=== Bottom half ===
==== Section 3 ====
First round
(Spain) E Sánchez (Bulgaria) K Maleeva | 6 | 6
(United States) J Arons (United States) J Kaplan | 1 | 1
(Brazil) D Campos (Czechoslovakia) R Maršíková | 6 | 6
(France) T Champion (France) C Vanier | 0 | 1
(France) T Benhabiles (France) N Phan-Thanh | 7 | 3 | 4
(Chile) H Gildemeister (West Germany) B Bunge | 6 | 6 | 6
(Soviet Union) A Chesnokov (Soviet Union) L Savchenko | 5 | 6 | 6
(Australia) M Fancutt (United States) S Walsh-Pete | 7 | 4 | 4
(United States) B Willenborg (United States) P Barg | 6 | 6
(Mexico) F Maciel (United States) MJ Fernández | 1 | 4
(Mexico) L Lavalle (United States) G Fernández | 5 | 2
(Spain) D de Miguel (Bulgaria) M Maleeva | 7 | 6
(France) F Errard (Socialist Federal Republic of Yugoslavia) M Jaušovec | 6 | 4 | 7
(Australia) O Davidson (United Kingdom) A Croft | 4 | 6 | 5
(Soviet Union) A Zverev (Soviet Union) S Parkhomenko | 4 | 7 | 3
(Australia) M Edmondson (South Africa) R Fairbank | 6 | 5 | 6

Second round
(Spain) E Sánchez (Bulgaria) K Maleeva | 3 | 6 | 3
(Brazil) D Campos (Czechoslovakia) R Maršíková | 6 | 1 | 6
(Chile) H Gildemeister (West Germany) B Bunge | w/o
(Soviet Union) A Chesnokov (Soviet Union) L Savchenko
(United States) B Willenborg (United States) P Barg | 2 | 6
(Spain) D de Miguel (Bulgaria) M Maleeva | 6 | 7
(France) F Errard (Socialist Federal Republic of Yugoslavia) M Jaušovec | 5 | 0
(Australia) M Edmondson (South Africa) R Fairbank | 7 | 6

Third round
(Brazil) D Campos (Czechoslovakia) R Maršíková | 6 | 3 | 6
(Chile) H Gildemeister (West Germany) B Bunge | 1 | 6 | 4
(Spain) D de Miguel (Bulgaria) M Maleeva | 5 | 3
(Australia) M Edmondson (South Africa) R Fairbank | 7 | 6

Quarterfinals
(Brazil) D Campos (Czechoslovakia) R Maršíková | 2 | 2
(Australia) M Edmondson (South Africa) R Fairbank | 6 | 6

==== Section 4 ====
First round
(Australia) M Kratzmann (France) C Tanvier | 1 | 6 | 6
(Iran) M Bahrami (Argentina) A Villagrán | 6 | 3 | 3
(United States) D Ralston (Canada) C Bassett | 3 | 2
(Mexico) J Lozano (United States) B Herr | 6 | 6
(Brazil) L Mattar (Brazil) P Medrado | 5 | 6 | 2
(Netherlands) T Nijssen (Netherlands) C Bakkum | 7 | 4 | 6
(Peru) P Arraya (Peru) L Gildemeister | w/o
(Australia) K Warwick (Australia) J Byrne
(Paraguay) F González (United States) P Smith | 6 | 1 | 6
(Italy) C Pistolesi (Italy) L Garrone | 3 | 6 | 1
(France) T Pham (France) C Suire | 6 | 6
(Australia) L Warder (Australia) L Field | 2 | 3
(Italy) S Colombo (Italy) S Cecchini | 6 | 6
(France) O Delaître (France) N Guerrée | 3 | 3
(Argentina) G Guerrero (Argentina) P Tarabini | 1 | 2
(Switzerland) H Günthardt (United States) M Navratilova | 6 | 6

Second round
(Australia) M Kratzmann (France) C Tanvier | 4 | 6
(Mexico) J Lozano (United States) B Herr | 6 | 7
(Netherlands) T Nijssen (Netherlands) C Bakkum | 6 | 3 | 4
(Peru) P Arraya (Peru) L Gildemeister | 3 | 6 | 6
(Paraguay) F González (United States) P Smith | 5 | 5
(France) T Pham (France) C Suire | 7 | 7
(Italy) S Colombo (Italy) S Cecchini | 4 | 2
(Switzerland) H Günthardt (United States) M Navratilova | 6 | 6

Third round
(Mexico) J Lozano (United States) B Herr | 7 | 6
(Peru) P Arraya (Peru) L Gildemeister | 5 | 4
(France) T Pham (France) C Suire | 3 | 5
(Switzerland) H Günthardt (United States) M Navratilova | 6 | 7

Quarterfinals
(Mexico) J Lozano (United States) B Herr | 7 | 6
(Switzerland) H Günthardt (United States) M Navratilova | 6 | 3
