= 1985 Bordeaux Open =

- Date: 16–20 September
- Edition: 7th
- Category: Grand Prix
- Draw: 32S / 16D
- Prize money: $80,000
- Surface: Clay / outdoor
- Location: Bordeaux, France
- Venue: Villa Primrose

Champions

Singles
- (Uruguay) Diego Pérez

Doubles
- (United Kingdom) David Felgate / (United Kingdom) Steve Shaw
← 1984 ·	Bordeaux Open	· 1986 →

The 1985 Bordeaux Open also known as the Nabisco Grand Prix Passing Shot was a men's tennis tournament played on clay courts at Villa Primrose in Bordeaux, France that was part of the 1985 Nabisco Grand Prix circuit. It was the seventh edition of the tournament and took place from 16 September until 20 September 1985. Fifth-seeded Diego Pérez won the singles title.

== Finals ==
=== Singles ===
(Uruguay) Diego Pérez defeated (United States) Jimmy Brown 6–4, 7–6

- It was Pérez' only singles title of his career.

=== Doubles ===
(United Kingdom) David Felgate / (United Kingdom) Steve Shaw defeated (Czechoslovakia) Libor Pimek / (United States) Blaine Willenborg 6–4, 5–7, 6–4
