= 1986 French Open – Men's singles =

Men's singles
- 1986 French Open

Final
- Champion: (Czechoslovakia) Ivan Lendl
- Runner-up: (Sweden) Mikael Pernfors
- Score: 6–3, 6–2, 6–4

Details
- Draw: 128
- Seeds: 16

Events
Singles	men	women		boys	girls
Doubles	men	women	mixed	boys	girls
WC Singles	men	women	quad
WC Doubles	men	women	quad
Legends	−45	45+	women
- French Open

Ivan Lendl defeated Mikael Pernfors in the final, 6–3, 6–2, 6–4 to win the men's singles tennis title at the 1986 French Open. It was his second French Open title and third major title overall.

Mats Wilander was the defending champion, but lost in the third round to Andrei Chesnokov.

== Seeds ==
The seeded players are listed below. Ivan Lendl is the champion; others show the round in which they were eliminated.

1. (Czechoslovakia) Ivan Lendl (champion)
2. (Sweden) Mats Wilander (third round)
3. (West Germany) Boris Becker (quarterfinals)
4. (France) Yannick Noah (fourth round)
5. (Sweden) Stefan Edberg (second round)
6. (Sweden) Joakim Nyström (first round)
7. (Sweden) Anders Järryd (third round)
8. (France) Henri Leconte (semifinals)
9. (Ecuador) Andrés Gómez (quarterfinals)
10. (France) Thierry Tulasne (second round)
11. (Argentina) Martín Jaite (fourth round)
12. (Argentina) Guillermo Vilas (quarterfinals)
13. (United States) Johan Kriek (semifinals)
14. (Spain) Emilio Sánchez (fourth round)
15. n/a
16. (Switzerland) Heinz Günthardt (first round)

== Draw ==
=== Key ===
- Q = Qualifier
- WC = Wild card
- LL = Lucky loser
- r = Retired

=== Finals ===
Quarterfinals
1	(Czechoslovakia) Ivan Lendl	6	7	6	6
9	(Ecuador) Andrés Gómez	7	6	0	0
13	(United States) Johan Kriek	3	7	7	7
12	(Argentina) Guillermo Vilas	6	6	6	6
(Sweden) Mikael Pernfors	2	6	6	6
3	(West Germany) Boris Becker	6	4	2	0
8	(France) Henri Leconte	6	6	6
(Soviet Union) Andrei Chesnokov	3	4	3

Semifinals
1	(Czechoslovakia) Ivan Lendl	6	6	6
13	(United States) Johan Kriek	2	1	0
(Sweden) Mikael Pernfors	2	7	7	6
8	(France) Henri Leconte	6	5	6	3

Final
1	(Czechoslovakia) Ivan Lendl	6	6	6
(Sweden) Mikael Pernfors	3	2	4

=== Section 1 ===
First round
1	(Czechoslovakia) I Lendl	6	6	6
(West Germany) M Westphal	3	3	4
(Switzerland) J Hlasek	1	6	1	7	6
(India) R Krishnan	6	3	6	5	3
(Australia) S Youl	6	4	6	6	9
(Mexico) L Lavalle	3	6	4	7	7
Q	(Argentina) C Miniussi	4	6	6	7
(Czechoslovakia) M Vajda	6	1	4	5
(Czechoslovakia) T Šmid	6	6	4	6
(West Germany) H Schwaier	3	4	6	2
(South Africa) C Steyn	6	6	2	3	2
(United States) T Nelson	2	3	6	6	6
(Uruguay) D Pérez	6	7	2	6
(United States) M De Palmer	1	6	6	2
(West Germany) D Keretić	4	6	4	7	8
16	(Switzerland) H Günthardt	6	3	6	6	6

Second round
1	(Czechoslovakia) I Lendl	6	6	6
(Switzerland) J Hlasek	3	3	3
(Australia) S Youl	4	7	3	2
Q	(Argentina) C Miniussi	6	5	6	6
(Czechoslovakia) T Šmid	6	6	7
(United States) T Nelson	4	2	6
(Uruguay) D Pérez	6	1	6
(West Germany) D Keretić	7	6	7

Third round
1	(Czechoslovakia) I Lendl	6	6	6
Q	(Argentina) C Miniussi	1	1	2
(Czechoslovakia) T Šmid	6	6	4	1	3
(West Germany) D Keretić	4	4	6	6	6

Fourth round
1	(Czechoslovakia) I Lendl	6	6	6
(West Germany) D Keretić	1	2	4

=== Section 2 ===
First round
9	(Ecuador) A Gómez	6	3	7	6
(Canada) G Michibata	3	6	5	3
(Brazil) N Aerts	7	6	4	6	6
(Australia) M Edmondson	6	7	6	3	2
Q	(West Germany) A Stepanek	1	2	2
(Sweden) K Carlsson	6	6	6
(Sweden) H Sundström	7	7	6
(Australia) B Dyke	5	5	2
(Australia) D Cahill	4	6	6	6
Q	(Brazil) J Góes	6	3	2	0
(Sweden) U Stenlund	6	6	6
(West Germany) A Maurer	3	1	2
Q	(Socialist Federal Republic of Yugoslavia) M Ostoja	6	6	6	1	6
(United Kingdom) J Bates	2	2	7	6	3
(United States) B Schultz	1	3	1
7	(Sweden) A Järryd	6	6	6

Second round
9	(Ecuador) A Gómez	6	6	4	6
(Brazil) N Aerts	1	4	6	3
(Sweden) K Carlsson	6	3	6	6
(Sweden) H Sundström	4	6	3	2
(Australia) D Cahill	3	1	0
(Sweden) U Stenlund	6	6	6
Q	(Socialist Federal Republic of Yugoslavia) M Ostoja	2	4	6	5
7	(Sweden) A Järryd	6	6	1	7

Third round
9	(Ecuador) A Gómez	7	7	5	6
(Sweden) K Carlsson	5	6	7	3
(Sweden) U Stenlund	6	6	6
7	(Sweden) A Järryd	4	2	3

Fourth round
9	(Ecuador) A Gómez	7	7	4	3	6
(Sweden) U Stenlund	5	6	6	6	4

=== Section 3 ===
First round
4	(France) Y Noah	6	6	6	6	6
WC	(France) T Benhabiles	3	4	7	7	4
(United States) S Giammalva Jr.	5	6	6	6
Q	(Sweden) C Bergström	7	1	1	3
(Spain) F Luna	6	4	7	6
(Sweden) P Lundgren	4	6	6	2
(United States) M Freeman	4	6	7	6
(United States) M Davis	6	3	6	3
(United Kingdom) J Lloyd	7	5	1	4
Q	(Brazil) L Mattar	5	7	6	6
(Australia) P Doohan	6	2	0	3	r
(Australia) J Fitzgerald	3	6	6	4
(Czechoslovakia) M Šrejber	7	6	6
(United States) K Flach	6	2	2
(Brazil) C Kirmayr	1	6	2
13	(United States) J Kriek	6	7	6

Second round
4	(France) Y Noah	6	6	6	6
(United States) S Giammalva Jr.	3	7	4	4
(Spain) L Luna	6	6	6
(United States) M Freeman	2	3	3
Q	(Brazil) L Mattar	6	7	6	6
(Australia) J Fitzgerald	7	5	4	3
(Czechoslovakia) M Šrejber	1	3	7	3
13	(United States) J Kriek	6	6	5	6

Third round
4	(France) Y Noah	4	7	6	6
(Spain) F Luna	6	6	4	3
Q	(Brazil) L Mattar	4	4	6	6	3
13	(United States) J Kriek	6	6	3	2	6

Fourth round
4	(France) Y Noah	w/o
13	(United States) J Kriek

=== Section 4 ===
First round
12	(Argentina) G Vilas	6	6	6
Q	(Chile) P Rebolledo	1	1	4
(Sweden) S Eriksson	2	6	0	0
(Canada) M Wostenholme	6	1	6	6
(Sweden) J Gunnarsson	6	6	6
Q	(Netherlands) T Nijssen	1	3	3
(Spain) S Casal	6	4	6	6
(Czechoslovakia) K Nováček	3	6	4	2
(Austria) T Muster	6	6	6
(United States) T Wilkison	3	4	3
(France) G Forget	6	6	3	7
(Peru) P Arraya	3	4	6	6
(West Germany) E Jelen	7	7	6
(Socialist Federal Republic of Yugoslavia) S Živojinović	6	6	4
(Australia) P McNamee	1	6	6	6
6	(Sweden) J Nyström	6	3	2	0

Second round
12	(Argentina) G Vilas	7	6	6
(Canada) M Wostenholme	5	2	2
(Sweden) J Gunnarsson	7	6	7
(Spain) S Casal	6	4	5
(Austria) T Muster	2	3	6	6
(France) G Forget	6	6	4	7
(West Germany) E Jelen	6	6	7
(Australia) P McNamee	4	4	5

Third round
12	(Argentina) G Vilas	7	6	3	6
(Sweden) J Gunnarsson	6	2	6	1
(France) G Forget	6	6	6
(West Germany) E Jelen	2	1	2

Fourth round
12	(Argentina) G Vilas	6	3	4	6	8
(France) G Forget	2	6	6	1	6

=== Section 5 ===
First round
5	(Sweden) S Edberg	6	3	6	6
Q	(Israel) S Perkiss	3	6	4	1
WC	(France) O Delaître	6	4	2
(Sweden) M Pernfors	7	6	6
Q	(Australia) M Kratzmann	6	3	6	3
(United States) R Seguso	4	6	7	6
WC	(France) B Dadillon	1	3	3
(Spain) J López-Maeso	6	6	6
Q	(Spain) J Clavet	4	7	6	6
(United States) G Layendecker	6	6	0	3
(Switzerland) C Mezzadri	6	6	4	6
Q	(France) T Van Den Daele	7	2	6	7
(Czechoslovakia) M Mečíř	6	6	6
(South Africa) M Robertson	1	1	3
(Haiti) R Agénor	1	6	6	2	4
11	(Argentina) M Jaite	6	3	0	6	6

Second round
5	(Sweden) S Edberg	7	5	3	6	4
(Sweden) M Pernfors	6	7	6	2	6
(United States) R Seguso	6	7	6
(Spain) J López-Maeso	2	5	2
Q	(Spain) J Clavet	6	6	5	6
Q	(France) T Van Den Daele	3	3	7	3
(Czechoslovakia) M Mečíř	6	6	6	3	1
11	(Argentina) M Jaite	7	1	2	6	6

Third round
(Sweden) M Pernfors	7	6	6
(United States) R Seguso	5	2	0
Q	(Spain) J Clavet	0	1	3
11	(Argentina) M Jaite	6	6	6

Fourth round
(Sweden) M Pernfors	6	3	7	7
11	(Argentina) M Jaite	1	6	6	6

=== Section 6 ===
First round
14	(Spain) E Sánchez	1	2	6	6	6
(United States) T Witsken	6	6	2	1	1
Q	(Italy) C Pistolesi	5	4	5
(Netherlands) M Schapers	7	6	7
Q	(Switzerland) S Medem	3	2	2
WC	(France) J-P Fleurian	6	6	6
(Argentina) R Argüello	3	3	3
(United States) J Canter	6	6	6
(United States) E Teltscher	6	6	6
(South Africa) D Visser	2	2	0
(United States) L Duncan	6	6	7	6
(Nigeria) N Odizor	3	7	6	0
(Socialist Federal Republic of Yugoslavia) B Orešar	7	6	6
(South Africa) E Edwards	6	0	0
WC	(France) J Potier	0	3	0
3	(West Germany) B Becker	6	6	6

Second round
14	(Spain) E Sánchez	6	6	6
(Netherlands) M Schapers	3	2	2
WC	(France) J-P Fleurian	3	2	7	7	7
(United States) J Canter	6	6	5	5	5
(United States) E Teltscher	7	7	6
(United States) L Duncan	5	5	1
(Socialist Federal Republic of Yugoslavia) B Orešar	2	0	7	3
3	(West Germany) B Becker	6	6	6	6

Third round
14	(Spain) E Sánchez	6	6	6	6
WC	(France) J-P Fleurian	1	1	7	3
(United States) E Teltscher	3	3	7	4
3	(West Germany) B Becker	6	6	5	6

Fourth round
14	(Spain) E Sánchez	0	6	6	4	2
3	(West Germany) B Becker	6	4	4	6	6

=== Section 7 ===
First round
8	(France) H Leconte	6	6	6
(Spain) D De Miguel	3	1	3
(Czechoslovakia) P Složil	5	6	2	4
(Israel) A Mansdorf	7	2	6	6
(Brazil) C Motta	6	6	6
(Australia) M Woodforde	4	4	2
Q	(United States) B Willenborg	3	6	1	6	3
WC	(France) É Winogradsky	6	3	6	1	6
(Peru) C Di Laura	2	2	6	3
(Chile) H Gildemeister	6	6	3	6
(Argentina) H de la Peña	6	6	7
(Belgium) L Pimek	1	4	6
(Italy) C Panatta	6	7	6
(Argentina) M Ingaramo	3	5	2
(Italy) F Cancellotti	6	4	7	3	3
10	(France) T Tulasne	4	6	5	6	6

Second round
8	(France) H Leconte	7	6	4	6
(Israel) A Mansdorf	5	3	6	0
(Brazil) C Motta	6	4	6	6	6
WC	(France) E Winogradsky	1	6	7	3	4
(Chile) H Gildemeister	0	3	4
(Argentina) H de la Peña	6	6	6
(Italy) C Panatta	0	3	6	6	6
10	(France) T Tulasne	6	6	2	4	4

Third round
8	(France) H Leconte	1	3	7	6	6
(Brazil) C Motta	6	6	6	0	0
(Argentina) H de la Peña	3	4	7	6	7
(Italy) C Panatta	6	6	5	3	5

Fourth round
8	(France) H Leconte	6	6	6
(Argentina) H de la Peña	1	2	1

=== Section 8 ===
First round
LL	(Romania) F Segărceanu	3	4	3
(Mexico) F Maciel	6	6	6
(Australia) W Masur	6	4	6	6	6
(Spain) J Aguilera	1	6	7	2	8
(Peru) J Yzaga	6	5	7	7
WC	(Paraguay) V Pecci Sr.	3	7	5	5
Q	(Netherlands) M Oosting	0	6	1	0
WC	(France) T Pham	6	4	6	6
(Soviet Union) A Chesnokov	6	2	6	6
(Sweden) J Svensson	3	6	4	2
(West Germany) R Osterthun	1	7	3	6	6
(Argentina) E Bengoechea	6	6	6	4	1
(France) T Champion	2	4	4
(United States) A Krickstein	6	6	6
(Chile) R Acuña	0	6	1	1
2	(Sweden) M Wilander	6	4	6	6

Second round
(Mexico) F Maciel	6	6	6
(Spain) J Aguilera	4	4	1
(Peru) J Yzaga	3	4	2
WC	(France) T Pham	6	6	6
(Soviet Union) A Chesnokov	6	6	6
(West Germany) R Osterthun	2	3	2
(United States) A Krickstein	1	6	7	3	4
2	(Sweden) M Wilander	6	3	5	6	6

Third round
(Mexico) F Maciel	3	7	6	7
WC	(France) T Pham	6	5	3	6
(Soviet Union) A Chesnokov	6	6	6
2	(Sweden) M Wilander	2	3	2

Fourth round
(Mexico) F Maciel	4	1	6	1
(Soviet Union) A Chesnokov	6	6	4	6

Preceded by 1985 Australian Open	Grand Slam men's singles	Succeeded by 1986 Wimbledon Championships
