= Alex Stepanek =

German tennis player

- ITF name: Alexander Stepanek
- Country (sports): West Germany
- Born: 11 July 1963 (age 62) Munich, West Germany
- Height: 1.80 m (5 ft 11 in)
- Prize money: $25,847

Singles
- Career record: 2–9
- Career titles: 0
- Highest ranking: No. 133 (24 Feb 1986)

Grand Slam singles results
- French Open: 1R (1986)

Doubles
- Career record: 1–1
- Career titles: 0
- Highest ranking: No. 336 (16 May 1988)

Alexander Stepanek (Czech: Štěpánek; born 11 July 1963) is a former professional German tennis player who represented West Germany.

== Career ==
After making it through qualifying, Stepanek played Kent Carlsson in the opening round of the 1986 French Open. He lost in straight sets.

The West German made the round of 16 at Bordeaux and Madrid in 1986.

== Challenger titles ==
=== Singles: (1) ===
No.	Year	Tournament	Surface	Opponent	Score
1.	1986	Travemünde, West Germany	Clay	(Australia) Carl Limberger	6–2, 6–0
