= Jesús Colás =

Spanish tennis player (born 1961)

- Full name: Jesús Colás Abad
- Country (sports): Spain
- Born: November 11, 1961 (age 63) Las Palmas, Gran Canaria
- Plays: Right-handed
- Prize money: $62,790

Singles
- Career record: 2–8
- Career titles: 0
- Highest ranking: No. 157 (4 July 1988)

Doubles
- Career record: 14–19
- Career titles: 0
- Highest ranking: No. 102 (19 May 1986)

Grand Slam doubles results
- French Open: 1R (1986)

Jesús Colás Abad (born 11 November 1961) is a former professional tennis player from Spain.

== Biography ==
Colás come from Las Palmas, the capital of Gran Canaria, in the Canary Islands.

A right-handed player, Colás won a doubles title on the Challenger circuit in Messina in 1985, with David de Miguel, who was a regular partner on tour.

He made one Grand Prix final, the doubles at Madrid in 1986, with de Miguel. In the final they were defeated by top seeds Anders Järryd and Joakim Nyström.

His only main draw appearance in a Grand Slam tournament came at the 1986 French Open, in the men's doubles with de Miguel. The Spaniards were unable to get past Jan Gunnarsson and Michael Mortensen in the first round.

Although more successful in doubles, Colás featured in the singles draws of several Grand Prix tournaments. He won matches at the Torneo Godó in Barcelona in 1988 and 1988 Geneva Open, both over countryman Alberto Tous.

== Grand Prix career finals ==
=== Doubles: 1 (0–1) ===
Result	W/L	Date	Tournament	Surface	Partner	Opponents	Score
Loss	0–1	May 1986	Madrid, Spain	Clay	(Spain) David de Miguel	(Sweden) Anders Järryd (Sweden) Joakim Nyström	2–6, 2–6

== Challenger titles ==
=== Doubles: (1) ===
No.	Year	Tournament	Surface	Partner	Opponents	Score
1.	1985	Messina, Italy	Clay	(Spain) David de Miguel	(New Zealand) Bruce Derlin (United Kingdom) David Felgate	6–1, 7–6
