= Willenborg =

Willenborg is a German surname. Notable people with the surname include:

- Bernhard Willenborg, German politician, Centre Party, in Landtag Oldenburg
- Blaine Willenborg (born 1960), American tennis player
- Frank Willenborg (born 1979), German football referee
