= Thierry Van Den Daele =

French tennis player

- Country (sports): France
- Born: 27 May 1966 (age 58)
- Plays: Left-handed

Singles
- Career record: 1–4
- Career titles: 0
- Highest ranking: No. 315 (6 April 1987)

Grand Slam singles results
- French Open: 2R (1986)

Doubles
- Highest ranking: No. 798 (23 March 1987)

Mixed doubles

Grand Slam mixed doubles results
- French Open: 1R (1987)

Thierry Van Den Daele (born 27 May 1966) is a former professional tennis player from France.

== Career ==
Van Den Daele made the second round of the 1986 French Open, after securing a win over Switzerland's Claudio Mezzadri. He then lost to fellow qualifier José Clavet in four sets.

In the 1987 French Open, Van Den Daele lost in the opening round to Jordi Arrese. He also exited in the first round of the mixed doubles, with partner Karine Quentrec.
