= 1986 Bordeaux Open =

- Date: 7–11 July
- Edition: 9th
- Category: Grand Prix
- Draw: 32S / 16D
- Prize money: $125,000
- Surface: Clay
- Location: Bordeaux, France
- Venue: Villa Primrose

Champions

Singles
- (Italy) Paolo Canè

Doubles
- (Spain) Jordi Arrese / (Spain) David de Miguel
| ← 1985 · | Bordeaux Open | · 1987 → |

The 1986 Bordeaux Open also known as the Nabisco Grand Prix Passing Shot was a men's tennis tournament played on clay courts at Villa Primrose in Bordeaux, France that was part of the 1986 Nabisco Grand Prix. It was the ninth edition of the tournament and was held from 7 July until 11 July 1986. Unseeded Paolo Canè won the singles title.

== Finals ==
=== Singles ===
(Italy) Paolo Canè defeated (Sweden) Kent Carlsson 6–4, 1–6, 7–5

- It was Canè's first singles title of his career.

=== Doubles ===
(Spain) Jordi Arrese / (Spain) David de Miguel defeated (Haiti) Ronald Agénor / (Iran) Mansour Bahrami 7–5, 6–4
