= 1984 Bordeaux Open =

- Date: 17–21 September
- Edition: 6th
- Category: Grand Prix
- Draw: 32S / 16D
- Prize money: $75,000
- Surface: Clay / outdoor
- Location: Bordeaux, France
- Venue: Villa Primrose

Champions

Singles
- (Spain) José Higueras

Doubles
- (Czechoslovakia) Pavel Složil / (United States) Blaine Willenborg
- Bordeaux Open

The 1984 Bordeaux Open also known as the Grand Prix Passing Shot was a men's tennis tournament played on outdoor clay courts at Villa Primrose in Bordeaux, France that was part of the 1984 Volvo Grand Prix. It was the sixth edition of the tournament and was held from 17 September until 21 September 1984. Third-seeded José Higueras won the singles title.

== Finals ==
=== Singles ===
(Spain) José Higueras defeated (Italy) Francesco Cancellotti 7–6, 6–1

- It was Higueras' 2nd singles title of the year and the 16th and last of his career.

=== Doubles ===
(Czechoslovakia) Pavel Složil / (United States) Blaine Willenborg defeated (France) Loïc Courteau / (France) Guy Forget 6–1, 6–4
