= Bordeaux International =

Bordeaux International Bordeaux Internationale

Defunct tennis tournament
- Founded: 1897; 128 years ago
- Abolished: 1969; 56 years ago
- Location: Bordeaux, France
- Venue: Villa Primrose Bordeaux
- Surface: Clay

The Bordeaux International or Bordeaux Internationale also known as the Villa Primrose Cup or Coupe de la Villa Primrose was a men's and women's international clay court tennis tournament founded in 1897. The tournament was played at the La Festa Country Club, Bordeaux, France. It was played annually until 1969 when it was discontinued.

== History ==
In May 1897 the Société Athlétique de la Villa Primrose was founded. In the summer that year it staged its first tennis tournament. This first tournament was a club championship open to members only.

In 1907 the club championship became an open international tournament. The tournament attracted top players Frenchman Max Decugis, was the inaugural winner of the men's singles event. The prestigious Coupe de la Primrose was also offered for the first time in 1907. The first winner of the women's singles was France's Marguerite Broquedis.

The final men's singles champion was Chilean player Patricio Rodríguez, and the final women's singles champion was Belgium's Christiane Mercelis. In 1979 after a period of ten years a new main tour event for men was revived at Villa Primrose called the Bordeaux Open that ran until 1995 when it was abolished. In 2008 the Association of Tennis Professionals established a new challenger tournament for men at the same venue called the BNP Paribas Primrose Bordeaux that is still held today.

== Finals ==
=== Men's singles ===
(Incomplete Roll) included:

Villa Primrose Athletic Society Tennis Championship
Year	Champions	Runners-up	Score
1897	(France) Paul Robert Marcel Devès	(France) Paul Lebreton	3–6, 6–4, 4–6, 8–6, 6–3
1901	(France) Paul Robert Marcel Devès (2)	(France) Mr. Schroeder	6–0, 6–1
1902	(France) Daniel Édouard Lawton	(France) Paul Robert Marcel Devès	6–4, 6–4
1906	(France) Max Decugis	(France) Jean-Pierre Samazeuilh	6–2, 6–3, 3–6, 8–6

(Incomplete Roll)

Bordeaux International/Coupe de la Primrose
Year	Champions	Runners-up	Score
1907	(France) Max Decugis	(France) Jean Montariol	2–6, 6–4, 6–4, 6–2
1908	(New Zealand) Anthony Wilding	(France) Daniel Édouard Lawton	6–2, 6–0, 6–1
1909	(France) Max Decugis (2)	(France) Jean-Pierre Samazeuilh	6–2, 3–6, 6–3, 8–6
1910	(France) Jean Montariol	(France) Jean-Pierre Samazeuilh	?
1911	(France) Maurice Germot	(France) François Blanchy	6–3, 3–6, 6–2, 3–6, 8–6
1912	(France) Max Decugis (3)	(France) Jean Montariol	6–3, 6–3, 6–0
1913	(France) Max Decugis (4)	(France) Maurice Germot	6–8, 6–1, 6–0, 8–6
1914/1918	Tournament not held due to World War I		
1920	(Romania) Nicolae Mishu	(Austria) Ludwig von Salm-Hoogstraeten	6–4, 4–6, 8–6, 6–3
1922	(France) Jean Borotra	(France) Jean-Pierre Samazeuilh	6–3, 7–5 3–6 6–2
1923	(France) René Lacoste	(France) Jean Borotra	7–9, 6–2, 8–6
1924	(France) François Blanchy	(France) Jean-Pierre Samazeuilh	6–3, 3–6, 7–5, 6–3
1925	(France) Jean Borotra (2)	(France) Jean-Pierre Samazeuilh	6–0, 6–2, 6–2
1926	(France) Jean-Pierre Samazeuilh	(France) François Blanchy	8–6, 6–3, 4–6, 6–3
1927	(France) Antoine Gentien	(France) Jean-Pierre Samazeuilh	8–6, 6–0, 6–2
1928	(Argentina) Guillermo Robson	(Argentina) Ronaldo Boyd	3–6, 6–2, 6–4
1929	(France) Antoine Gentien (2)	(France) Jean-Pierre Samazeuilh	6–8, 6–3, 6–1, 6–1
1930	(France) Antoine Gentien (3)	(France) Jean-Pierre Samazeuilh	6–2, 6–2
1931	(France) Roger George	(France) Christian Boussus	1–6, 6–2, 6–1, 6–4
1932	(France) Roland Journu	(France) Alexandre Goldryn	6–1, 3–6, 7–5, 6–2
1933	(France) André Martin-Legeay	(France) Roland Journu	6–4, 6–4, 6–3
1934	(France) André Martin-Legeay (2)	(France) Jean Lesueur	6–2, 8–6, 6–4
1936	(France) André Martin-Legeay (3)	(Spain) Enrique Maier	6–3, 7–5, 9–7
1937	(France) Paul Féret	(France) Jean Lesueur	1–6, 6–4, 6–1, 6–3
1939	(France) Roland Journu (2)	(France) Christian Boussus	8–6, 3–6, 3–6, 6–3, 6–1
1952	(United States) Irvin Dorfman	(France) Jean Ducos de la Haille	3–6, 6–3, 6–3, 6–4
1954	(Australia) Rex Hartwig	(Australia) Neale Fraser	6–1, 6–2
1955	(France) Jean-Claude Molinari	(France) Jean-Noël Grinda	3–6, 6–3, 6–1, 6–3
1957	(France) Bernard Destremau	(France) Alain Lemyze	6–4, 6–0
1958	(France) Alain Bresson	(France) Georges Deniau	6–2, 8–6, 6–3
1963	(France) François Jauffret	(Tunisia) Mustapha Belkhodja	6–2, 6–2
1964	(France) Jean-Claude Barclay	(Chile) Patricio Rodríguez	6–2, 7–5, 6–1
1967	(Brazil) Thomaz Koch	(Brazil) José Edison Mandarino	6–4, 5–6, 6–2, 7–5
↓ Open era ↓
1969	(Chile) Patricio Rodríguez	(Greece) Nicholas Kalogeropoulos	0–6, 9–7, 6–4, 6–4
For the successor men's event see Bordeaux Open

=== Women's singles ===
Bordeaux International/Coupe de la Primrose
Year	Champions	Runners-up	Score
1907	(France) Marguerite Broquedis	?	?
1911	(France) Marguerite Broquedis (2)	(France) Mme Flouch	6–2, 6–1
1912	(France) Marie Decugis	(Belgium) Jeanne Liebrechts	8–6, 6–2
1913	(United States) Elizabeth Ryan	(France) Marie Decugis	6–2, 6–1
1914/1918	Tournament not held due to World War I		
1920	(France) Hélène Contostavlos	(France) Germaine Bourgeois Pigueron	8–6, 6–2
1921	(United Kingdom) Phyllis Satterthwaite	(France) Sylvia Henrotin	6–3, 6–4
1922	(France) Germaine Bourgeois Pigueron	(France) Mlle Flouch	6–1, 6–1
1923	(France) Marguerite Broquedis-Billout (3)	(France) Mlle de Luze	6–0, 6–3
1924	(France) Yvonne Bourgeois	(France) Marguerite Broquedis-Billout	6–2, 2–6, 6–2
1925	(France) Marguerite Broquedis-Billout (4)	(France) Yvonne Bourgeois	7–5, 7–5
1926	(Germany) Nelly Neppach	(Denmark) Margethe Kahler	6–1, 6–0
1927	(France) Marguerite Broquedis-Billout (5)	(France) Yvonne Bourgeois	9–7, 6–2
1928	(France) Marguerite Broquedis-Billout (6)	(France) Germaine Leconte	6–4, 3–6, 6–2
1929	(France) Marguerite Broquedis-Billout (7)	(France) Jacqueline Gallay	6–3, 6–4
1930	(France) Simone Marre	(France) Marguerite Broquedis-Billout	6–4, 4–6, 7–5
1931	(Spain) Isabela Dutton de Pons	(France) Simone Marre	6–3, 3–6, 6–3
1932	(Spain) Isabela Dutton de Pons	(Italy) Lucia Valerio	7–5, 4–6, 6–4
1933	(France) Simone Passermard Mathieu	(France) Sylvia Henrotin	3–6, 6–4, 6–2
1934	(France) Simone Passermard Mathieu (2)	(France) Ida Adamoff	7–5, 6–2
1935	(Spain) Lilí Álvarez	(United States) Dorothy Andrus Burke	6–3, 9–7
1936	(France) Simone Passermard Mathieu (3)	(France) Simone Iribarne	3–6, 6–4, 6–2
1937	(France) Simone Passermard Mathieu (4)	(United Kingdom) Susan Noel	6–2, 6–3
1938	(United Kingdom) Susan Noel	(Switzerland) Lolette Payot	4–6, 10–8, 6–3
1939	(France) Jeanne Peyré	(France) Simone Iribarne Lafargue	6–1, 2–6, 6–3
1951	(United Kingdom) Patricia Ward	(Italy) Manuela Bologna	6–4, 6–3
1952	(Chile) Anita Lizana	(Mexico) Melita Ramírez	4–6, 7–5, 6–3
↓ Open era ↓
1969	(Belgium) Christiane Mercelis	(West Germany) Almut Sturm	0–6, 6–2, 6–4

== Venue ==
The Villa Primrose Tennis Club still operates today. It covers approximately 27,081m2 and has 10 outdoor clay courts, 2 outdoor green-set courts, 5 indoor clay courts, 3 mini tennis courts and 1 practice wall.

== Tournament statistics ==
=== Men's singles ===
- Most titles: (France) Max Decugis (4)
- Most consecutive titles: (France) André Martin-Legeay (3)
- Most finals: (France) Jean-Pierre Samazeuilh (8)
- Most consecutive finals: (France) André Martin-Legeay (3)

=== Women's singles ===
- Most titles: (France) Marguerite Broquedis-Billout (7)
- Most consecutive titles: (France) Marguerite Broquedis-Billout (3)
- Most finals: (France) Marguerite Broquedis-Billout (8)
- Most consecutive finals: (France) Marguerite Broquedis-Billout (4)
