= Carlos di Laura =

Peruvian tennis player

- Country (sports): Peru
- Born: 19 October 1964 (age 61) Lima, Peru
- Height: 1.75 m (5 ft 9 in)
- Turned pro: 1983
- Retired: 1994
- Plays: Left-handed
- Prize money: $173,556

Singles
- Career record: 11–28
- Career titles: 0
- Highest ranking: 92 (12 May 1986)

Grand Slam singles results
- French Open: 1R (1986)

Doubles
- Career record: 59–50
- Career titles: 3
- Highest ranking: 29 (23 October 1989)

Grand Slam doubles results
- French Open: SF (1989)
- US Open: 1R (1985, 1987, 1989)

Grand Slam mixed doubles results
- French Open: 1R (1986)

Carlos di Laura (born 19 October 1964) is a former tennis player from Peru.

He participated in the 1984 Summer Olympics for his native country. The left-hander won three tour doubles titles during his professional career.

Di Laura reached his highest singles ranking on 12 May 1986, when he became the world No. 92.

== Career finals ==
=== Doubles (3 titles, 2 runner-ups) ===
Result	W/L	Date	Tournament	Surface	Partner	Opponents	Score
Loss	0–1	Jun 1986	Athens, Greece	Clay	(Italy) Claudio Panatta	(Czechoslovakia) Libor Pimek (United States) Blaine Willenborg	7–5, 4–6, 2–6
Loss	0–2	Sep 1986	Barcelona, Spain	Clay	(Italy) Claudio Panatta	(Sweden) Jan Gunnarsson (Sweden) Joakim Nyström	3–6, 4–6
Win	1–2	Sep 1987	Madrid Tennis Grand Prix, Spain	Clay	(Spain) Javier Sánchez	(Spain) Sergio Casal (Spain) Emilio Sánchez	6–3, 3–6, 7–6
Win	2–2	Sep 1988	Campionati Internazionali di Sicilia, Italy	Clay	(Uruguay) Marcelo Filippini	(Argentina) Alberto Mancini (Argentina) Christian Miniussi	6–2, 6–0
Win	3–2	Sep 1989	Bordeaux, France	Clay	(Spain) Tomás Carbonell	(Mexico) Agustín Moreno (Peru) Jaime Yzaga	6–4, 6–3
