= Guy Forget =

French tennis player

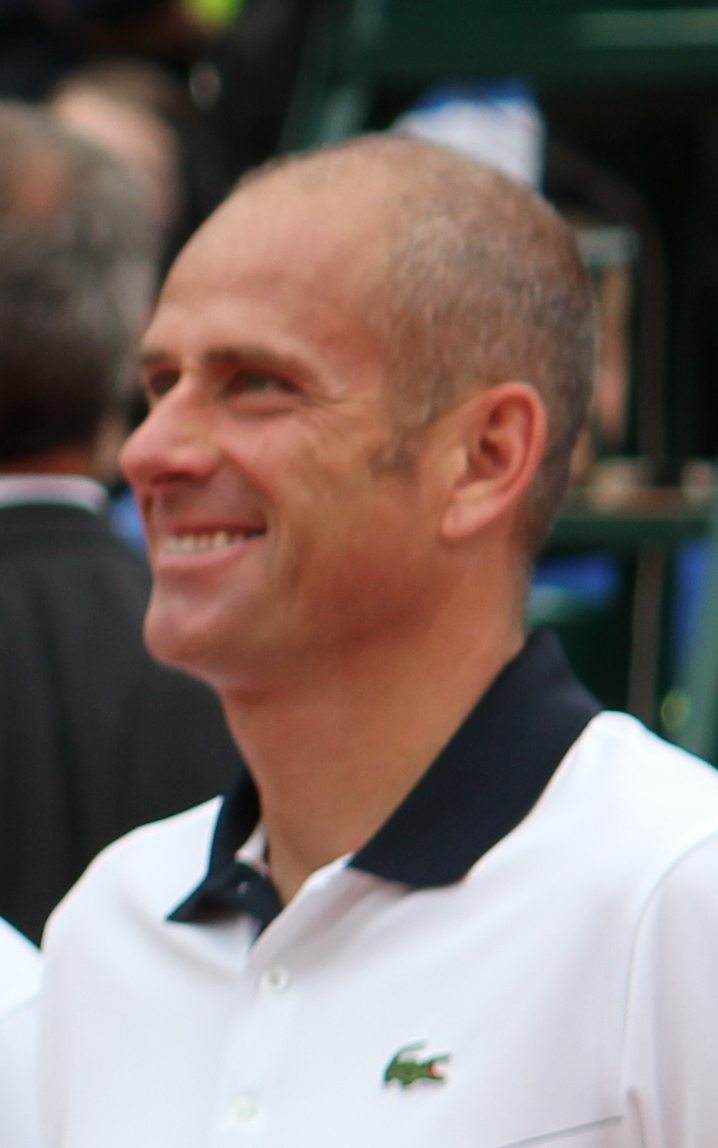
- Forget at the French Open in 2012
- Country (sports): France
- Residence: Neuchâtel, Switzerland
- Born: 4 January 1965 (age 61) Casablanca, Morocco
- Height: 1.90 m (6 ft 3 in)
- Turned pro: 1982
- Retired: 1997
- Plays: Left-handed (one-handed backhand)
- Prize money: $5,669,934

Singles
- Career record: 378–290 (56.6%)
- Career titles: 11
- Highest ranking: No. 4 (25 March 1991)

Grand Slam singles results
- Australian Open: QF (1991, 1993)
- French Open: 4R (1986, 1991)
- Wimbledon: QF (1991, 1992, 1994)
- US Open: 4R (1992, 1996)

Other tournaments
- Tour Finals: RR (1991)
- Grand Slam Cup: QF (1991)
- Olympic Games: QF (1984, demonstration)

Doubles
- Career record: 387–182
- Career titles: 28
- Highest ranking: No. 3 (18 August 1986)

Grand Slam doubles results
- French Open: F (1987, 1996)

Other doubles tournaments
- Tour Finals: W (1990)

Team competitions
- Davis Cup: W (1991, 1996)

Guy Forget (French: [ɡi fɔʁʒɛ]; born 4 January 1965) is a French tennis administrator and retired professional player. During his career, he helped France win the Davis Cup in both 1991 and 1996. Since retiring as a player, he has served as France's Davis Cup team captain.

== Early life and amateur career ==
Forget first came to the tennis world's attention as an outstanding junior player who won the French Open junior title in 1982. He turned professional later that year.

== Professional career ==
Forget's breakthrough year on the professional tour was 1986 when he made it to the fourth round of Roland Garros, his best grand slam at that point, and won his first top-level singles title in Toulouse, where both his father and grandfather had won, respectively in 1966 and 1946, and where he won again in 1991 and 1992. He was also part of the French team which won the World Team Cup. Forget also won six doubles titles in 1986, reaching his career-high doubles ranking of World Number 3 in August that year, finishing in the runner-up spot with partner Yannick Noah at the 1986 ATP Tour World Championships tournament.

In 1987, Forget and Yannick Noah finished runners-up in the men's doubles at the French Open. In 1990, Forget partnered with Jakob Hlasek to win the ATP Tour World Championships doubles title.

1991 was the most memorable year of Forget's career. He won six singles titles that year, the biggest coming at the ATP Masters Series events in Cincinnati and Paris. In both finals, he defeated Pete Sampras. He reached his career-high singles ranking of World Number 4 in March that year.

Forget was a member of the French team which won the 1991 Davis Cup. In the final, France faced the United States. Forget teamed up with Henri Leconte to win the doubles rubber, and then won the decisive singles rubber against Pete Sampras as France shocked the heavily favoured US team to win 3–1.

1996 was another notable year in Forget's career. Partnering Jakob Hlasek, he again finished runner-up in the men's doubles event at the French Open. He also won what proved to be his last career singles title in Marseille. For a second time, he was on a French team which won the Davis Cup. In the final, he teamed-up with Guillaume Raoux to win a critical doubles rubber, as France defeated Sweden 3–2.

Forget played for France's Davis Cup team for 12 years, compiling a 38–11 record.

Forget retired from the professional tour in 1997. During his career, he won a total of 11 top-level singles titles and 28 doubles titles. His career prize-money earnings totalled US$5,669,934.

After retiring as a player, Forget served as France's Davis Cup team captain. He also served as France's Fed Cup team captain from 1999 to 2004; his best result was France's performance in 2003 (with a squad including Mary Pierce, Amélie Mauresmo, Émilie Loit and Stéphanie Cohen-Aloro) when they defeated USA in the final. However, he resigned in 2004 to focus on his Davis Cup duties, and the French team then lost to Russia in the final (when Marion Bartoli and Émilie Loit lost to Anastasia Myskina and Vera Zvonareva in the last, deciding doubles match).

In 2011, the International Tennis Federation (ITF) presented him with its highest accolade, the Philippe Chatrier Award, for his contributions to tennis.

He joined the directing committee of the French Open in 2011, and in 2012 he became director of the Masters of Paris Bercy.

In 2016, he became director of the French Open after the dismissal of Gilbert Ysern.

== Grand Slam finals ==
=== Doubles (2 runner-ups) ===
Result	Year	Championship	Surface	Partner	Opponents	Score
Loss	1987	French Open	Clay	(France) Yannick Noah	(Sweden) Anders Järryd (United States) Robert Seguso	7–6^{(7–5)}, 7–6^{(7–2)}, 3–6, 4–6, 2–6
Loss	1996	French Open	Clay	(Switzerland) Jakob Hlasek	(Russia) Yevgeny Kafelnikov (Czech Republic) Daniel Vacek	2–6, 3–6

== ATP World Championships finals ==
=== Doubles (1 title, 1 runner-up) ===
Result	Year	Location	Partner	Opponents	Score
Loss	1986	New York City	(France) Yannick Noah	(Sweden) Stefan Edberg (Sweden) Anders Järryd	3–6, 6–7^{(2–7)}, 3–6
Win	1990	Frankfurt	(Switzerland) Jakob Hlasek	(Spain) Sergio Casal (Spain) Emilio Sánchez	6–4, 7–6^{(7–5)}, 5–7, 6–4

== Career finals ==
=== Singles (11 titles, 8 runners-up) ===
Legend Grand Slam (0–0) Tennis Masters Cup (0–0) ATP Masters Series (2–3) ATP Championship Series (1–0) Grand Prix (8–5)	Titles by surface Hard (8) Grass (0) Clay (1) Carpet (2)

Result	W/L	Date	Tournament	Surface	Opponent	Score
Win	1–0	Oct 1986	Toulouse, France	Hard (i)	(Sweden) Jan Gunnarsson	4–6, 6–3, 6–2
Win	2–0	Mar 1989	Nancy, France	Carpet	(Netherlands) Michiel Schapers	6–3, 7–6^{(7–5)}
Loss	2–1	Nov 1989	Wembley, England	Carpet	(United States) Michael Chang	2–6, 2–6, 1–6
Loss	2–2	Apr 1990	Nice, France	Clay	(Spain) Juan Aguilera	6–2, 3–6, 4–6
Win	3–2	Sep 1990	Bordeaux, France	Clay	(Socialist Federal Republic of Yugoslavia) Goran Ivanišević	6–4, 6–3
Win	4–2	Jan 1991	Sydney Outdoor, Australia	Hard	(Germany) Michael Stich	6–3, 6–4
Win	5–2	Feb 1991	Brussels, Belgium	Carpet	(Soviet Union) Andrei Cherkasov	6–3, 7–5, 3–6, 7–6^{(7–5)}
Loss	5–3	Mar 1991	Indian Wells, US	Hard	(United States) Jim Courier	6–4, 3–6, 6–4, 3–6, 6–7^{(4–7)}
Win	6–3	Aug 1991	Cincinnati, US	Hard	(United States) Pete Sampras	2–6, 7–6^{(7–4)}, 6–4
Win	7–3	Sep 1991	Bordeaux, France	Hard	(France) Olivier Delaître	6–1, 6–3
Win	8–3	Oct 1991	Toulouse, France	Hard (i)	(Israel) Amos Mansdorf	6–2, 7–6^{(7–4)}
Win	9–3	Nov 1991	Paris, France	Carpet	(United States) Pete Sampras	7–6^{(11–9)}, 4–6, 5–7, 6–4, 6–4
Loss	9–4	Jan 1992	Sydney Outdoor, Australia	Hard	(Spain) Emilio Sánchez	3–6, 4–6
Win	10–4	Oct 1992	Toulouse, France	Hard (i)	(Czechoslovakia) Petr Korda	6–3, 6–2
Loss	10–5	Nov 1992	Stockholm, Sweden	Carpet	(Croatia) Goran Ivanišević	6–7^{(2–7)}, 6–4, 6–7^{(5–7)}, 2–6
Loss	10–6	Nov 1992	Paris, France	Carpet	(Germany) Boris Becker	6–7^{(3–7)}, 3–6, 6–3, 3–6
Loss	10–7	Jul 1994	Gstaad, Switzerland	Clay	(Spain) Sergi Bruguera	6–3, 5–7, 2–6, 1–6
Loss	10–8	Jun 1995	London/Queen's Club, England	Grass	(United States) Pete Sampras	6–7^{(3–7)}, 6–7^{(6–8)}
Win	11–8	Feb 1996	Marseille, France	Hard (i)	(France) Cédric Pioline	7–5, 6–4

=== Doubles (28 titles, 17 runners-up) ===
Result	W/L	Date	Tournament	Surface	Partner	Opponents	Score
Loss	0–1	Sep 1984	Bordeaux, France	Clay	(France) Loïc Courteau	(Czechoslovakia) Pavel Složil (United States) Blaine Willenborg	1–6, 4–6
Loss	0–2	Apr 1985	Nice, France	Clay	(France) Loïc Courteau	(Italy) Claudio Panatta (Czechoslovakia) Pavel Složil	6–3, 3–6, 6–8
Win	1–2	Nov 1985	Stockholm, Sweden	Hard (i)	(Ecuador) Andrés Gómez	(United States) Mike De Palmer (United States) Gary Donnelly	6–3, 6–4
Win	2–2	Nov 1985	Wembley, England	Carpet	(Sweden) Anders Järryd	(West Germany) Boris Becker (Socialist Federal Republic of Yugoslavia) Slobodan Živojinović	7–5, 4–6, 7–5
Loss	2–3	Feb 1986	Memphis, US	Carpet	(Sweden) Anders Järryd	(United States) Ken Flach (United States) Robert Seguso	4–6, 6–4, 6–7
Win	3–3	Mar 1986	La Quinta, US	Hard	(United States) Peter Fleming	(France) Yannick Noah (United States) Sherwood Stewart	6–4, 6–3
Win	4–3	Mar 1986	Metz, France	Carpet	(Poland) Wojciech Fibak	(Paraguay) Francisco González (Netherlands) Michiel Schapers	2–6, 6–2, 6–4
Win	5–3	Apr 1986	Monte Carlo, Monaco	Clay	(France) Yannick Noah	(Sweden) Joakim Nyström (Sweden) Mats Wilander	6–4, 3–6, 6–4
Win	6–3	May 1986	Rome, Italy	Clay	(France) Yannick Noah	(Australia) Mark Edmondson (United States) Sherwood Stewart	7–6, 6–2
Win	7–3	Jun 1986	London/Queen's Club, England	Grass	(United States) Kevin Curren	(Australia) Darren Cahill (Australia) Mark Kratzmann	6–2, 7–6
Win	8–3	Oct 1986	Basel, Switzerland	Hard (i)	(France) Yannick Noah	(Sweden) Jan Gunnarsson (Czechoslovakia) Tomáš Šmíd	7–6, 6–4
Loss	8–4	Nov 1986	Itaparica, Brazil	Hard	(France) Loic Courteau	(United States) Chip Hooper (United States) Mike Leach	5–7, 3–6
Loss	8–5	Dec 1986	Masters Doubles, London	Carpet	(France) Yannick Noah	(Sweden) Stefan Edberg (Sweden) Anders Järryd	3–6, 6–7, 3–6
Win	9–5	Feb 1987	Lyon, France	Carpet	(France) Yannick Noah	(United States) Kelly Jones (United States) David Pate	4–6, 6–3, 6–4
Win	10–5	Feb 1987	Indian Wells, US	Hard	(France) Yannick Noah	(West Germany) Boris Becker (West Germany) Eric Jelen	6–4, 7–6
Win	11–5	May 1987	Forest Hills, US	Clay	(France) Yannick Noah	(United States) Gary Donnelly (United States) Peter Fleming	4–6, 6–4, 6–1
Win	12–5	May 1987	Rome, Italy	Clay	(France) Yannick Noah	(Czechoslovakia) Miloslav Mečíř (Czechoslovakia) Tomáš Šmíd	6–2, 6–7, 6–3
Loss	12–6	Jun 1987	French Open, Paris	Clay	(France) Yannick Noah	(Sweden) Anders Järryd (United States) Robert Seguso	7–6, 7–6, 3–6, 4–6, 2–6
Win	13–6	Jun 1987	London/Queen's Club, England	Grass	(France) Yannick Noah	(United States) Rick Leach (United States) Tim Pawsat	6–4, 6–4
Loss	13–7	Jul 1987	Gstaad, Switzerland	Clay	(France) Loic Courteau	(Sweden) Jan Gunnarsson (Czechoslovakia) Tomáš Šmíd	6–7, 2–6
Win	14–7	Mar 1988	Indian Wells, US	Hard	(West Germany) Boris Becker	(Mexico) Jorge Lozano (United States) Todd Witsken	6–4, 6–4
Win	15–7	Mar 1988	Orlando, US	Hard	(France) Yannick Noah	(United States) Sherwood Stewart (Australia) Kim Warwick	6–4, 6–4
Win	16–7	Apr 1988	Nice, France	Clay	(France) Henri Leconte	(Switzerland) Heinz Günthardt (Italy) Diego Nargiso	4–6, 6–3, 6–4
Loss	16–8	Oct 1988	Toulouse, France	Hard (i)	(Iran) Mansour Bahrami	(Netherlands) Tom Nijssen (West Germany) Ricki Osterthun	3–6, 4–6
Win	17–8	Feb 1990	Stuttgart Indoor, West Germany	Carpet	(Switzerland) Jakob Hlasek	(Denmark) Michael Mortensen (Netherlands) Tom Nijssen	6–3, 6–2
Win	18–8	Mar 1990	Indian Wells, US	Hard	(West Germany) Boris Becker	(United States) Jim Grabb (United States) Patrick McEnroe	4–6, 6–4, 6–3
Win	19–8	Aug 1990	Long Island, US	Hard	(Switzerland) Jakob Hlasek	(West Germany) Udo Riglewski (West Germany) Michael Stich	2–6, 6–3, 6–4
Win	20–8	Oct 1990	Tokyo Indoor, Japan	Carpet	(Switzerland) Jakob Hlasek	(United States) Scott Davis (United States) David Pate	7–6, 7–5
Win	21–8	Oct 1990	Stockholm, Sweden	Carpet	(Switzerland) Jakob Hlasek	(Australia) John Fitzgerald (Sweden) Anders Järryd	6–4, 6–2
Win	22–8	Nov 1990	Sanctuary Cove, Australia	Hard	(Switzerland) Jakob Hlasek	(Spain) Emilio Sánchez (Spain) Sergio Casal	6–4, 7–6, 5–7, 6–4
Loss	22–9	Mar 1991	Indian Wells, US	Hard	(France) Henri Leconte	(United States) Jim Courier (Spain) Javier Sánchez	6–7, 6–3, 3–6
Loss	22–10	Jul 1991	Gstaad, Switzerland	Clay	(Switzerland) Jakob Hlasek	(South Africa) Gary Muller (South Africa) Danie Visser	6–7, 4–6
Win	23–10	Sep 1991	Bordeaux, France	Hard	(France) Arnaud Boetsch	(Germany) Patrik Kühnen (Germany) Alexander Mronz	6–2, 6–2
Loss	23–11	Feb 1992	Brussels, Belgium	Carpet	(Switzerland) Jakob Hlasek	(Germany) Boris Becker (United States) John McEnroe	3–6, 2–6
Loss	23–12	Sep 1992	Bordeaux, France	Clay	(France) Arnaud Boetsch	(Spain) Sergio Casal (Spain) Emilio Sánchez	1–6, 4–6
Loss	23–13	Oct 1992	Toulouse, France	Hard (i)	(France) Henri Leconte	(United States) Brad Pearce (South Africa) Byron Talbot	1–6, 6–3, 3–6
Win	24–13	Mar 1993	Indian Wells, US	Hard	(France) Henri Leconte	(United States) Luke Jensen (United States) Scott Melville	6–4, 7–5
Win	25–13	Jun 1994	Halle, Germany	Grass	(France) Olivier Delaître	(France) Henri Leconte (South Africa) Gary Muller	6–4, 6–7, 6–4
Win	26–13	Aug 1994	Long Island, US	Hard	(France) Olivier Delaître	(Australia) Andrew Florent (United Kingdom) Mark Petchey	6–4, 7–6
Win	27–13	Sep 1994	Bordeaux, France	Hard	(France) Olivier Delaître	(Italy) Diego Nargiso (France) Guillaume Raoux	6–2, 2–6, 7–5
Win	28–13	Feb 1995	Milan, Italy	Carpet	(Germany) Boris Becker	(Czech Republic) Petr Korda (Czech Republic) Karel Nováček	6–2, 6–4
Loss	28–14	Oct 1995	Ostrava, Czech Republic	Carpet	(Australia) Patrick Rafter	(Sweden) Jonas Björkman (Argentina) Javier Frana	7–6, 4–6, 6–7
Loss	28–15	Mar 1996	Milan, Italy	Carpet	(Switzerland) Jakob Hlasek	(Italy) Andrea Gaudenzi (Croatia) Goran Ivanišević	4–6, 5–7
Loss	28–16	May 1996	Hamburg, Germany	Clay	(Switzerland) Jakob Hlasek	(The Bahamas) Mark Knowles (Canada) Daniel Nestor	2–6, 4–6
Loss	28–17	Jun 1996	French Open, Paris	Clay	(Switzerland) Jakob Hlasek	(Russia) Yevgeny Kafelnikov (Czech Republic) Daniel Vacek	2–6, 3–6

== Performance timelines ==
=== Singles ===
Key
W	F	SF	QF	#R	RR	Q#	DNQ	A	NH

(W) winner; (F) finalist; (SF) semifinalist; (QF) quarterfinalist; (#R) rounds 4, 3, 2, 1; (RR) round-robin stage; (Q#) qualification round; (DNQ) did not qualify; (A) absent; (NH) not held; (SR) strike rate (events won / competed); (W–L) win–loss record.

Tournament	1982	1983	1984	1985	1986	1987	1988	1989	1990	1991	1992	1993	1994	1995	1996	1997	Career SR	Career win–loss
Grand Slam tournaments
Australian Open	3R	A	4R	1R	NH	A	2R	1R	2R	QF	2R	QF	A	2R	1R	1R	0 / 12	16–12
French Open	3R	1R	1R	1R	4R	1R	3R	A	3R	4R	2R	A	A	2R	3R	A	0 / 12	16–12
Wimbledon	A	1R	3R	1R	1R	4R	1R	A	4R	QF	QF	A	QF	2R	1R	A	0 / 12	21–12
U.S. Open	A	1R	1R	2R	2R	3R	2R	A	1R	2R	4R	A	2R	1R	4R	A	0 / 12	13–12
Grand Slam SR	0 / 2	0 / 3	0 / 4	0 / 4	0 / 3	0 / 3	0 / 4	0 / 1	0 / 4	0 / 4	0 / 4	0 / 1	0 / 2	0 / 4	0 / 4	0 / 1	0 / 48	N/A
Annual win–loss	3–2	0–3	5–4	1–4	4–3	5–3	4–4	0–1	6–4	12–4	9–4	4–1	5–2	3–4	5–4	0–1	N/A	66–48
ATP Masters Series
Indian Wells	These Tournaments Were Not Masters Series Events Before 1990								2R	F	2R	1R	A	2R	1R	1R	0 / 7	6–7
Miami	These Tournaments Were Not Masters Series Events Before 1990								3R	4R	A	4R	A	2R	2R	1R	0 / 6	6–6
Monte Carlo	These Tournaments Were Not Masters Series Events Before 1990								3R	3R	3R	2R	1R	1R	A	A	0 / 6	5–6
Rome	These Tournaments Were Not Masters Series Events Before 1990								QF	A	1R	A	A	A	1R	A	0 / 3	3–3
Hamburg	These Tournaments Were Not Masters Series Events Before 1990								SF	A	A	1R	A	A	1R	A	0 / 3	4–3
Montreal/Toronto	These Tournaments Were Not Masters Series Events Before 1990								A	A	A	A	A	A	1R	A	0 / 1	0–1
Cincinnati	These Tournaments Were Not Masters Series Events Before 1990								3R	W	2R	A	A	1R	A	A	1 / 4	7–3
Stuttgart (Stockholm)	These Tournaments Were Not Masters Series Events Before 1990								3R	3R	F	A	2R	1R	A	A	0 / 5	7–5
Paris	These Tournaments Were Not Masters Series Events Before 1990								3R	W	F	A	3R	3R	1R	A	1 / 6	14–5
Masters Series SR	N/A								16–8	18–4	9–6	3–4	3–3	3–6	0–6	0–2	N/A	52–39
Masters Series SR	N/A								0 / 8	2 / 6	0 / 6	0 / 4	0 / 3	0 / 6	0 / 6	0 / 2	2 / 41	N/A
Year-end ranking	70	188	36	61	25	54	48	36	16	7	11	158	40	71	51	1121	N/A	

=== Doubles ===
Tournament	1982	1983	1984	1985	1986	1987	1988	1989	1990	1991	1992	1993	1994	1995	1996	1997	1998	1999	2000	Career SR	Career win–loss
Grand Slam tournaments
Australian Open	A	A	1R	2R	NH	A	3R	2R	2R	1R	A	A	A	A	SF	1R	A	A	A	0 / 7	8–6
French Open	1R	A	3R	2R	3R	F	1R	A	1R	3R	2R	A	2R	3R	F	A	1R	2R	2R	0 / 15	23–15
Wimbledon	A	A	A	A	3R	QF	QF	A	3R	A	SF	A	A	QF	QF	A	A	A	A	0 / 8	20–8
U.S. Open	A	A	1R	2R	QF	1R	3R	A	QF	A	A	A	2R	A	SF	A	A	A	A	0 / 8	13–8
Grand Slam SR	0 / 1	0 / 0	0 / 3	0 / 3	0 / 3	0 / 3	0 / 4	0 / 1	0 / 4	0 / 2	0 / 2	0 / 0	0 / 2	0 / 2	0 / 4	0 / 1	0 / 1	0 / 1	0 / 1	0 / 38	N/A
Annual win–loss	0–1	0–0	2–3	2–3	7–3	8–3	6–4	1–1	6–3	2–2	5–2	0–0	2–2	5–2	16–4	0–1	0–1	1–1	1–1	N/A	64–37
ATP Masters Series
Indian Wells	These Tournaments Were Not Masters Series Events Before 1990								W	F	2R	W	A	QF	2R	1R	A	A	A	2 / 7	18–5
Miami	These Tournaments Were Not Masters Series Events Before 1990								SF	2R	A	A	A	A	2R	A	A	A	A	0 / 3	3–3
Monte Carlo	These Tournaments Were Not Masters Series Events Before 1990								QF	A	QF	1R	1R	SF	A	A	A	A	A	0 / 5	6–5
Rome	These Tournaments Were Not Masters Series Events Before 1990								1R	A	2R	A	A	A	1R	A	A	A	A	0 / 3	1–3
Hamburg	These Tournaments Were Not Masters Series Events Before 1990								QF	A	A	A	A	A	F	A	A	A	A	0 / 2	4–2
Montreal/Toronto	These Tournaments Were Not Masters Series Events Before 1990								A	A	A	A	A	A	1R	A	A	A	A	0 / 1	0–1
Cincinnati	These Tournaments Were Not Masters Series Events Before 1990								SF	1R	SF	A	A	1R	A	A	A	A	A	0 / 4	6–4
Stuttgart (Stockholm)	These Tournaments Were Not Masters Series Events Before 1990								W	A	A	A	A	2R	2R	A	A	A	A	1 / 3	5–2
Paris	These Tournaments Were Not Masters Series Events Before 1990								QF	1R	A	A	A	2R	2R	A	A	A	A	0 / 4	2–3
Masters Series SR	N/A								2 / 8	0 / 4	0 / 4	1 / 2	0 / 1	0 / 5	0 / 7	0 / 1	0 / 0	0 / 0	0 / 0	3 / 32	N/A
Annual win–loss	N/A								18–6	4–4	7–4	5–1	0–1	7–4	4–7	0–1	0–0	0–0	0–0	N/A	45–28
Year-end ranking	717	166	217	23	8	6	15	152	4	84	29	114	96	32	14	565	1384	652	463	N/A	

== Personal life ==
Forget married Isabelle Chassande-Barrioz-Chabrel in 1989. The couple has two sons, Mathieu and Thibault. Thibault has also played professional tennis.

Awards and achievements
Preceded by Florence Arthaud; Max Morinière; Daniel Sangouma; Jean-Charles Trouabal; Bruno Marie-Rose	French Sportsperson of the Year; 1991 (with Henri Leconte)	Succeeded by Marie-José Pérec
Preceded by (Sweden) Mikael Pernfors	ATP Comeback Player of the Year; 1994	Succeeded by (United States) Derrick Rostagno
