= Thierry Pham =

French tennis player

- Country (sports): France
- Residence: Paris
- Born: 28 April 1962 (age 63); Lyon, France
- Height: 1.78 m (5 ft 10 in)
- Plays: Right-handed
- Prize money: $34,754

Singles
- Career record: 7–7
- Career titles: 0
- Highest ranking: No. 179 (14 July 1986)

Grand Slam singles results
- French Open: 3R (1986)

Doubles
- Career record: 5–14
- Career titles: 0
- Highest ranking: No. 163 (13 April 1987)

Grand Slam doubles results
- French Open: 2R (1986)

Mixed doubles

Grand Slam mixed doubles results
- French Open: 3R (1984, 1986)

Thierry Pham (born 28 April 1962) is a former professional tennis player from France.

== Career ==
Pham played in a Davis Cup tie for France in 1986, against Turkey, with they won 5–0. He won both of his singles rubbers, over Alaaddin Karagoz and Necvet Demir.

In the 1986 French Open, Pham had wins over Dutchman Menno Oosting and world number 54 Jaime Yzaga, to make the third round, where he was defeated by Francisco Maciel in four sets. He also made the second round of the men's doubles (with Bruno Dadillon) and the round of 16 in the mixed doubles (with Catherine Suire). His only other appearance in the main singles draw of a Grand Slam came at the 1987 French Open and he beat Patrik Kühnen in the first round, then lost to 14th seed Martín Jaite.

== Challenger titles ==
=== Doubles: (1) ===
No.	Date	Tournament	Surface	Partner	Opponents	Score
1.	1987	Tarbes, France	Clay	(Senegal) Yahiya Doumbia	(Argentina) Roberto Azar (Argentina) Marcelo Ingaramo	7–6, 6–4
