= Bruno Dadillon =

French former professional tennis player

- Country (sports): France
- Born: 9 February 1964 (age 61); Manosque, France
- Height: 5 ft 9 in (175 cm)
- Plays: Left-handed
- Prize money: $12,678

Singles
- Career record: 2–4
- Highest ranking: No. 263 (10 December 1984)

Grand Slam singles results
- French Open: 1R (1986)

Doubles
- Career record: 4–10
- Highest ranking: No. 185 (4 May 1987)

Grand Slam doubles results
- French Open: 2R (1986)

Grand Slam mixed doubles results
- French Open: 1R (1986, 1987)

Bruno Dadillon (born 9 February 1964) is a French former professional tennis player.

Born in Manosque, Dadillon was a left-handed player who competed on the professional tour in the 1980s.

His best performances on the Grand Prix circuit were second-round appearances at the 1985 Bordeaux Open and the 1986 Athens Open. He also featured as a wildcard in the main draw of the 1986 French Open, where he was beaten in the first round by José López-Maeso.

Dadillon was the coach of French tennis players Fabrice Santoro and Virginie Razzano.
