= David de Miguel =

Spanish tennis player (born 1965)

- Country (sports): Spain
- Residence: Barcelona
- Born: 7 February 1965 (age 61) Tortosa, Spain
- Height: 1.75 m (5 ft 9 in)
- Plays: Right-handed
- Prize money: $162,135

Singles
- Career record: 17–33
- Career titles: 0
- Highest ranking: No. 81 (31 August 1987)

Grand Slam singles results
- French Open: 1R (1986)
- Wimbledon: 1R (1986, 1987)

Doubles
- Career record: 30–42
- Career titles: 1
- Highest ranking: No. 68 (11 August 1986)

Grand Slam doubles results
- French Open: 2R (1987)
- Wimbledon: 1R (1986, 1987)

Mixed doubles
- Career titles: 0

Grand Slam mixed doubles results
- French Open: 3R (1986)

David de Miguel-Lapiedra (born 7 February 1965) is a Spanish former professional tennis player.

== Career ==
De Miguel had a good year as a junior in 1983, when he was an Orange Bowl semifinalist and won the Spanish Championships.

The Spaniard made his first Grand Prix quarterfinal in 1984, at Florence. He also reached the quarterfinals in Madrid the following year.

In 1986 he took part in both the French Open and Wimbledon Championships but lost in the first round at each, to Henri Leconte and then John Sadri. He made his only Grand Slam mixed doubles appearance in that French Open tournament, with Manuela Maleeva. They reached the round of 16. Also that year, he made quarter-finals in Stuttgart, where he had a win over world no. 24 Slobodan Živojinović, and in Barcelona. His best results however came in the doubles. He and Jordi Arrese were doubles champions in the 1986 Bordeaux Open, having months earlier finished runner-up with Jesus Colas in Madrid.

At the 1987 French Open, de Miguel progressed past the opening round of the men's doubles for the only time, partnering Arrese. He lost in the first round of the 1987 Wimbledon Championships to Scott Davis.

== Grand Prix career finals ==
=== Doubles: 2 (1–1) ===
Result	W/L	Date	Tournament	Surface	Partner	Opponents	Score
Loss	0–1	May 1986	Madrid, Spain	Clay	(Spain) Jesus Colas	(Sweden) Anders Järryd (Sweden) Joakim Nyström	2–6, 2–6
Win	1–1	Jul 1986	Bordeaux, France	Clay	(Spain) Jordi Arrese	(Haiti) Ronald Agénor (Iran) Mansour Bahrami	7–5, 6–4

== Challenger titles ==
=== Singles: (1) ===
No.	Year	Tournament	Surface	Opponent	Score
1.	1986	Marrakesh, Morocco	Clay	(France) Thierry Champion	6–2, 6–3

=== Doubles: (1) ===
No.	Year	Tournament	Surface	Partner	Opponents	Score
1.	1985	Messina, Italy	Clay	(Spain) Jesus Colas	(New Zealand) Bruce Derlin (United Kingdom) David Felgate	6–1, 7–6
