= Ronald Agénor =

Haitian tennis player (born 1964)

- Country (sports): Haiti
- Residence: Miami, Florida, United States
- Born: November 13, 1964 (age 61) Rabat, Morocco
- Height: 1.80 m (5 ft 11 in)
- Turned pro: 1983
- Retired: 2002 (Occasionally active from 2006 to 2012)
- Plays: Right-handed (one-handed backhand)
- Prize money: $2,014,601

Singles
- Career record: 221–256 (46.3%)
- Career titles: 3
- Highest ranking: No. 22 (8 May 1989)

Grand Slam singles results
- Australian Open: 2R (1990)
- French Open: QF (1989)
- Wimbledon: 2R (1989, 1993)
- US Open: 4R (1988)

Other tournaments
- Olympic Games: 1R (1984^{DE}, 1988, 1996)

Doubles
- Career record: 26–58 (31.0%)
- Career titles: 0
- Highest ranking: No. 111 (14 July 1986)

Grand Slam doubles results
- French Open: 1R (1986, 1988)
- Wimbledon: Q1 (1985)
- US Open: 1R (1986)
- Last updated on: 21 December 2021.

Ronald Jean-Martin Agénor (born November 13, 1964) is a former professional tennis player who represented Haiti during his playing career. He is the only Haitian to have ever earned a Top 25 world ranking in singles, reaching a highest singles ranking of world No. 22 in May 1989. During his career he won three ATP tour singles titles.

== Early life and junior tennis ==
Agénor was born on November 13, 1964, in Rabat, Morocco, the son of Frédéric Agénor, a former Haitian Diplomat at the United Nations and Minister of Agriculture of Haiti. He is the youngest of a family of six children and learned how to play tennis in Lubumbashi, Zaire (current Congo) in 1974 and discovered competitive tennis in Bordeaux, France in 1978 under the wing of his brother, Lionel. He was ranked No. 8 junior player in the world in 1982 and won 2 Junior titles in Charleroi, Belgium and Monte Carlo, Monaco.

== Pro tennis career ==
Agénor joined the professional tennis circuit in 1983. In 1989 he reached the quarterfinals of the French Open where he was defeated by eventual-champion Michael Chang in four sets, and won his first top-level singles title at Athens. In 1990, Agénor won two further tour singles titles at Berlin and Genoa.

He competed in three Summer Olympic Games, in 1984 (a demonstration event), 1988 and 1996.

In 1999, Agénor finished the year ranked World No. 98 and became the first player aged over 35 to finish in the top-100 since Jimmy Connors in 1992.

Agénor competed in his penultimate ATP-sanctioned tour event in July 2006 at the Aptos Futures event after a four-year layoff from tour tennis, losing 3–6, 4–6 in the first round.

In a career spanning 19 years, he reached the quarter finals at the French Open in 1989 by beating Carl Limberger, Tim Mayotte, Claudio Pistolesi and Sergi Bruguera before losing to champion Michael Chang. He also got to the fourth round of both the US Open and French Open in 1988. He represented Haiti in the Olympics in Los Angeles in 1984, in Seoul in 1988, and in Atlanta in 1996 and won 3 ATP Tour World titles in Athens, Genoa, and Berlin. At the French Open in 1994, he defeated David Prinosil, 14/12 in the fifth set and broke the previous record of the longest match in the number of games in the history of the French Open since the open era previously held by Emilio Sanchez. In 1987, his final at the Swiss Indoors against Yannick Noah from France, was the first ATP World Tour tennis final between two players of color in men's professional tennis history. After a break from the pro circuit, Agénor made a comeback in 1999 becoming, at 35 years of age, the oldest player to reach top 100 (ATP ranked #88) in the world since Jimmy Connors did it in 1991. In 2000, he represented and led the Lido Luzern Tennis Club in Switzerland to its first Swiss National title in 100 years. In 2001, at 37 years of age, he finished the year ATP ranked #186 appearing in a final against David Nalbandian from Argentina.

Agénor retired from professional tennis in 2002 and opened the Ronald Agenor Tennis Academy in Los Angeles, California.

In 2009, he entered qualifying for the Genova Challenger in singles, but retired in the first round.

In 2012, Agénor entered the doubles draw of Futures events in Casablanca, Innisbrook, and Edwardsville. Partnering Takanyi Garanganga, he came up short in his final match.

== ATP career finals ==
=== Singles: 8 (3 titles, 5 runner-ups) ===
Legend Grand Slam Tournaments (0–0) ATP World Tour Finals (0–0) ATP World Tour Masters Series (0–0) ATP Championship Series (0–0) ATP World Series (3–5)	Finals by surface Hard (0–0) Clay (2–4) Grass (0–0) Carpet (1–1)	Finals by setting Outdoors (2–4) Indoors (1–1)

Result	W–L	Date	Tournament	Tier	Surface	Opponent	Score
Loss	0–1	Jul 1987	Gstaad, Switzerland	Grand Prix	Clay	(Spain) Emilio Sánchez	2–6, 3–6, 6–7^{(5–7)}
Loss	0–2	Jul 1987	Bordeaux, France	Grand Prix	Clay	(Spain) Emilio Sánchez	7–5, 4–6, 4–6
Loss	0–3	Oct 1987	Basel, Switzerland	Grand Prix	Carpet	(France) Yannick Noah	6–7^{(6–8)}, 4–6, 4–6
Loss	0–4	Jul 1988	Bordeaux, France	Grand Prix	Clay	(Austria) Thomas Muster	3–6, 3–6
Win	1–4	Apr 1989	Athens, Greece	Grand Prix	Clay	(Sweden) Kent Carlsson	6–3, 6–4
Win	2–4	Jun 1990	Genoa, Italy	World Series	Clay	(France) Tarik Benhabiles	3–6, 6–4, 6–3
Win	3–4	Oct 1990	Berlin, Germany	World Series	Carpet	(Soviet Union) Alexander Volkov	4–6, 6–4, 7–6^{(10–8)}
Loss	3–5	Jul 1993	Båstad, Sweden	World Series	Clay	(Austria) Horst Skoff	5–7, 6–1, 0–6

=== Doubles: 2 (2 runner-ups) ===
Legend Grand Slam Tournaments (0–0) ATP World Tour Finals (0–0) ATP Masters Series (0–0) ATP Championship Series (0–0) ATP World Series (0–2)	Finals by surface Hard (0–0) Clay (0–2) Grass (0–0) Carpet (0–0)	Finals by setting Outdoors (0–2) Indoors (0–0)

Result	W–L	Date	Tournament	Tier	Surface	Partner	Opponents	Score
Loss	0–1	Jul 1986	Bordeaux, France	Grand Prix	Clay	(Iran) Mansour Bahrami	(Spain) Jordi Arrese (Spain) David de Miguel	5–7, 4–6
Loss	0–2	Jan 1995	Jakarta, Indonesia	World Series	Clay	(Japan) Shuzo Matsuoka	(South Africa) David Adams (Russia) Andrei Olhovskiy	5–7, 3–6

== ATP Challenger and ITF Futures finals ==
=== Singles: 15 (9–6) ===
Legend ATP Challenger (6–6) ITF Futures (3–0)	Finals by surface Hard (1–3) Clay (8–3) Grass (0–0) Carpet (0–0)

Result	W–L	Date	Tournament	Tier	Surface	Opponent	Score
Loss	0–1	Sep 1990	Hossegor, France	Challenger	Clay	(France) Rodolphe Gilbert	4–6, 4–6
Win	1–1	Mar 1991	Marseille, France	Challenger	Clay	(Czech Republic) Martin Střelba	5–7, 6–4, 6–2
Win	2–1	Jun 1992	Yvetot, France	Challenger	Clay	(Spain) Alex Corretja	6–4, 2–6, 7–5
Win	3–1	Oct 1993	La Possession, Réunion Island	Challenger	Hard	(United States) Jeff Tarango	6–3, 6–4
Loss	3–2	Dec 1993	Andorra la Vella, Andorra	Challenger	Hard	(Germany) Joern Renzenbrink	4–6, 7–5, 3–6
Win	4–2	May 1998	USA F1, Delray Beach	Futures	Clay	(Australia) Michael Hill	6–3, 6–3
Win	5–2	May 1998	USA F2, Vero Beach	Futures	Clay	(Chile) Nicolás Massú	6–3, 3–6, 6–3
Win	6–2	May 1998	USA F3, Boca Raton	Futures	Clay	(Chile) Nicolás Massú	6–1, 6–2
Win	7–2	Jun 1999	Fürth, Germany	Challenger	Clay	(Czech Republic) Tomas Zib	6–2, 7–6
Loss	7–3	Jul 1999	Lugano, Switzerland	Challenger	Clay	(Czech Republic) Michal Tabara	7–6^{(7–3)}, 4–6, 2–6
Win	8–3	Jul 1999	Contrexéville, France	Challenger	Clay	(France) Gerard Solves	7–6, 6–2
Loss	8–4	Jul 1999	Newcastle, United Kingdom	Challenger	Clay	(United States) Jeff Tarango	6–3, 0–6, 6–7
Win	9–4	May 2000	Birmingham, United States	Challenger	Clay	(Thailand) Paradorn Srichaphan	7–5, 6–3
Loss	9–5	Oct 2000	San Antonio, United States	Challenger	Hard	(Belgium) Xavier Malisse	6–7^{(3–7)}, 3–6
Loss	9–6	Mar 2001	Salinas, Ecuador	Challenger	Hard	(Argentina) David Nalbandian	4–6, 2–6

== Performance timelines ==
Key
W	F	SF	QF	#R	RR	Q#	DNQ	A	NH

(W) winner; (F) finalist; (SF) semifinalist; (QF) quarterfinalist; (#R) rounds 4, 3, 2, 1; (RR) round-robin stage; (Q#) qualification round; (DNQ) did not qualify; (A) absent; (NH) not held; (SR) strike rate (events won / competed); (W–L) win–loss record.

=== Singles ===
Tournament	1984	1985	1986	1987	1988	1989	1990	1991	1992	1993	1994	1995	1996	1997	1998	1999	2000	2001	SR	W–L	Win %	
Grand Slam tournaments
Australian Open	A	A	A	A	A	A	2R	A	A	1R	A	1R	A	A	A	A	1R	Q2	0 / 4	1–4	20%	
French Open	A	1R	1R	1R	4R	QF	1R	2R	1R	1R	3R	Q3	Q3	A	A	Q3	2R	Q2	0 / 11	11–11	50%	
Wimbledon	A	Q3	1R	A	A	2R	A	A	A	2R	1R	A	A	A	A	A	1R	Q2	0 / 5	2–5	29%	
US Open	A	1R	1R	2R	4R	3R	1R	1R	A	2R	2R	A	Q1	A	Q2	Q2	Q1	Q3	0 / 9	8–9	47%	
Win–loss	0–0	0–2	0–3	1–2	6–2	7–3	1–3	1–2	0–1	2–4	3–3	0–1	0–0	0–0	0–0	0–0	1–3	0–0	0 / 29	22–29	43%	
Olympic Games
Summer Olympics	1R	Not Held			1R	Not Held			A	Not Held			1R	Not Held			A	NH	0 / 3	0–3	0%	
ATP Tour Masters 1000
Indian Wells	A	A	A	A	A	A	1R	A	A	A	A	A	A	A	A	A	Q2	A	0 / 1	0–1	0%	
Miami	A	A	2R	2R	1R	1R	3R	A	2R	A	A	A	A	A	A	1R	Q2	Q1	0 / 7	4–7	36%	
Monte Carlo	A	A	QF	2R	1R	QF	3R	2R	A	A	1R	Q3	Q3	A	A	A	A	A	0 / 7	9–7	56%	
Hamburg	A	A	A	1R	A	A	2R	3R	A	1R	A	A	Q1	A	A	A	A	A	0 / 4	3–4	43%	
Rome	A	A	3R	3R	SF	1R	1R	1R	1R	Q3	1R	A	A	A	A	A	A	A	0 / 8	8–8	50%	
Canada	A	A	A	A	A	A	A	A	A	1R	1R	A	A	Q2	Q2	A	A	1R	0 / 3	0–3	0%	
Cincinnati	A	A	1R	1R	A	A	A	1R	A	A	A	A	A	A	A	A	A	Q1	0 / 3	0–3	0%	
Paris	A	A	2R	A	2R	2R	2R	1R	Q1	A	Q2	A	A	A	A	A	A	A	0 / 5	4–5	44%	
Win–loss	0–0	0–0	7–5	4–5	5–4	3–4	5–6	3–5	1–2	0–2	0–3	0–0	0–0	0–0	0–0	0–1	0–0	0–1	0 / 38	28–38	42%	
Career statistics
Titles / finals	0 / 0	0 / 0	0 / 0	0 / 3	0 / 1	1 / 1	2 / 2	0 / 0	0 / 0	0 / 1	0 / 0	0 / 0	0 / 0	0 / 0	0 / 0	0 / 0	0 / 0	0 / 0	0 / 0	0 / 0	0 / 0	0 / 1
Overall win–loss	0–2	17–14	20–22	25–20	24–18	24–17	35–25	16–27	5–16	19–25	15–23	10–14	0–5	0–1	1–1	3–7	6–16	1–3	221–256			
Win %	0%	55%	48%	56%	57%	59%	58%	37%	24%	43%	39%	42%	0%	0%	50%	30%	27%	25%	46.33%			
Year-end ranking	418	49	74	44	28	37	29	74	132	58	71	146	326	511	237	96	137	188	$2,014,601			

=== Doubles ===
Tournament	1985	1986	1987	1988	1989	1990	1991	1992	1993	1994	SR	W–L	Win %
Grand Slam tournaments
Australian Open	A	A	A	A	A	A	A	A	A	A	0 / 0	0–0	–
French Open	A	1R	A	1R	A	A	A	A	A	A	0 / 2	0–2	0%
Wimbledon	Q1	A	A	A	A	A	A	A	A	A	0 / 0	0–0	–
US Open	A	1R	A	A	A	A	A	A	A	A	0 / 1	0–1	0%
Win–loss	0–0	0–2	0–0	0–1	0–0	0–0	0–0	0–0	0–0	0–0	0 / 3	0–3	0%
ATP Masters Series
Miami	A	1R	1R	A	A	A	A	A	A	A	0 / 2	0–2	0%
Monte Carlo	A	A	A	A	1R	1R	A	A	A	Q2	0 / 2	0–2	0%
Hamburg	A	A	1R	A	A	A	A	A	Q1	A	0 / 1	0–1	0%
Canada	A	A	A	A	A	A	A	A	Q1	A	0 / 0	0–0	–
Cincinnati	A	2R	A	A	A	A	A	A	A	A	0 / 1	1–1	50%
Win–loss	0–0	1–2	0–2	0–0	0–1	0–1	0–0	0–0	0–0	0–0	0 / 6	1–6	14%

== After tennis ==
Agénor has also recorded music as a rock musician .

Agenor was once Honorary Consul of Haiti in Bordeaux, France (1989) and speaks several languages fluently. He is a member of the 'Champions for Peace' club, a group of high level sportsmen personally committed to the peace through sport movement, which is part of Peace and Sport, an organization under the patronage of Prince Albert II of Monaco. In 1989, he was Honorary Consul of Haiti in Bordeaux, France. In 2006, the city of Castelnau de Médoc, in wine country region of Bordeaux in France, named its newly built tennis facility after Ronald "Salle Ronald Agénor". In 2018, he was inducted into the Black Tennis Hall of Fame in a ceremony held at George Washington University, in Washington DC, and the tennis court “Court Ronald Agénor” was inaugurated in the Bordeaux Wine region, at Sainte Terre Tennis Club, France.
