= Steve Shaw (tennis) =

Former English tennis player

- Country (sports): (United Kingdom) Great Britain
- Residence: Winchmore Hill
- Born: 1 January 1963 (age 63) Enfield, Middlesex; England
- Height: 1.91 m (6 ft 3 in)
- Plays: Right-handed
- Prize money: $127,632

Singles
- Career record: 23–45
- Career titles: 0
- Highest ranking: No. 88 (20 May 1985)

Grand Slam singles results
- Australian Open: 2R (1984, 1988)
- French Open: 1R (1985)
- Wimbledon: 2R (1984, 1987)

Doubles
- Career record: 14–30
- Career titles: 1
- Highest ranking: No. 139 (15 September 1986)

Grand Slam doubles results
- Australian Open: 2R (1985)
- French Open: 1R (1986)
- Wimbledon: 3R (1988)

Mixed doubles
- Career titles: 0

Grand Slam mixed doubles results
- Wimbledon: 2R (1988)

Stephen "Steve" Shaw (born 1 January 1963) is a former professional tennis player from England who competed for Great Britain.

== Career ==
While studying sports medicine, Shaw played college tennis for the University of Alabama, from 1980 to 1982.

Shaw made his first big impression on the Grand Prix tennis circuit in 1985, when he made the final four at a tournament in Marbella. He had to retire hurt during his semi-final with Horacio de la Peña. The Englishman also reached quarter-finals in the 1987 Bordeaux Open and 1988 Bristol Open. He made the second round of a Grand Slam event on four occasions, with wins over Claudio Panatta, Damir Keretić, Todd Witsken and Carl Turich. He managed to take a set off Jimmy Connors in their second round meeting at the 1987 Wimbledon Championships.

In doubles, Shaw teamed up with David Felgate in 1985 to win the Bordeaux Open. His best Grand Slam doubles performances were made in the 1988 Wimbledon Championships, where he reached the third round of the men's doubles, partnering John Lloyd, as well as the second round of the mixed doubles, with Catarina Lindqvist. Shaw and Lloyd's run to the third round included a win over seventh seeds Paul Annacone and Christo van Rensburg.

He took part in four Davis Cup ties for Great Britain during his career, two against Yugoslavia and one each against Portugal and Austria. He won three of his eight rubbers, which all came in Great Britain's win over Portugal at Nottingham in 1985.

== Grand Prix career finals ==
=== Doubles: 1 (1–0) ===
Result	No.	Date	Tournament	Surface	Partner	Opponents	Score
Win	1–0	Sep 1985	Bordeaux, France	Clay	(United Kingdom) David Felgate	(Czechoslovakia) Libor Pimek (United States) Blaine Willenborg	6–4, 5–7, 6–4

== Challenger titles ==
=== Singles: (1) ===
No.	Year	Tournament	Surface	Opponent	Score
1.	1984	Thessaloniki, Greece	Clay	(Sweden) Stefan Svensson	6–2, 6–4

=== Doubles: (1) ===
No.	Year	Tournament	Surface	Partner	Opponents	Score
1.	1984	Thessaloniki, Greece	Clay	(United Kingdom) Jeremy Bates	(Greece) George Kalovelonis (Socialist Federal Republic of Yugoslavia) Slobodan Živojinović	6–2, 6–4
