= ATP Bordeaux =

Bordeaux Grand Prix

Defunct tennis tournament
- Event name: Various
- Tour: Grand Prix circuit (1979–1989); ATP Tour (1990–95)
- Founded: 1979
- Abolished: 1995
- Editions: 17
- Location: Bordeaux, France
- Venue: Villa Primrose
- Surface: Clay

The Bordeaux Grand Prix was a men's tennis tournament founded in 1979 as the Bordeaux Open. It was the successor event to the Bordeaux International (1907–1969) played at the same venue. It was held annually under variations of the name including the Grand Prix Passing Shot and was part of the Grand Prix tennis circuit tour. It then became an ATP Tour event until 1995. The tournament was played on two different surfaces during its tenure: clay from 1979 through 1990 and hard from 1991 through 1995.

Guy Forget was the only man to win the tournament more than once, doing so in 1990 and 1991. Yannick Noah, the only other Frenchman to triumph in the singles event, won the inaugural event of 1979.

In 1995 the tournament license was sold to the Lawn Tennis Association (LTA) of Great Britain for a fee of $620,000.

== Results ==
=== Singles ===
For the precursor men's event see Bordeaux International
Year	Tournament Name	Champions	Runners-up	Score
1979	Grand Prix Passing Shot	(France) Yannick Noah	(United States) Harold Solomon	6–0, 6–7, 6–1, 1–6, 6–4
1980	Grand Prix de Passing Shot	(Bolivia) Mario Martinez	(Italy) Gianni Ocleppo	6–0, 7–5, 7–5
1981	Grand Prix Passing Shot	(Ecuador) Andrés Gómez	(France) Thierry Tulasne	7–6, 7–6, 6–1
1982	Grand Prix Passing Shot	(Chile) Hans Gildemeister	(Peru) Pablo Arraya	7–5, 6–1
1983	Grand Prix Passing Shot	(Peru) Pablo Arraya	(Spain) Juan Aguilera	7–5, 7–5
1984	Grand Prix Passing Shot	(Spain) José Higueras	(Italy) Francesco Cancellotti	7–6, 6–1
1985	Nabisco Grand Prix Passing Shot	(Uruguay) Diego Pérez	(United States) Jimmy Brown	6–4, 7–6
1986	Nabisco Grand Prix Passing Shot	(Italy) Paolo Canè	(Sweden) Kent Carlsson	6–4, 1–6, 7–5
1987	Nabisco Grand Prix Passing Shot	(Spain) Emilio Sánchez	(Haiti) Ronald Agénor	5–7, 6–4, 6–4
1988	NGP Passing Shot de Bordeaux	(Austria) Thomas Muster	(Haiti) Ronald Agénor	6–3, 6–3
1989	Grand Prix Passing Shot de Bordeaux	(Czechoslovakia) Ivan Lendl	(Spain) Emilio Sánchez	6–2, 6–2
1990	Grand Prix Passing Shot	(France) Guy Forget	(Socialist Federal Republic of Yugoslavia) Goran Ivanišević	6–4, 6–3
1991	Grand Prix Passing Shot	(France) Guy Forget	(France) Olivier Delaître	6–1, 6–3
1992	Grand Prix Passing Shot	(Ukraine) Andrei Medvedev	(Spain) Sergi Bruguera	6–3, 1–6, 6–2
1993	Grand Prix Passing Shot Bordeaux	(Spain) Sergi Bruguera	(Italy) Diego Nargiso	7–5, 6–2
1994	Grand Prix Passing Shot	(South Africa) Wayne Ferreira	(United States) Jeff Tarango	6–0, 7–5
1995	Grand Prix Passing Shot Bordeaux	(Senegal) Yahiya Doumbia	(Switzerland) Jakob Hlasek	6–4, 6–4
Succeeded by Bournemouth International

=== Doubles ===
Year	Champions	Runners-up	Score
1979	(France) Patrice Dominguez (France) Denis Naegelen	(France) Bernard Fritz (Colombia) Iván Molina	6–4, 6–4
1980	(United Kingdom) John Feaver (France) Gilles Moretton	(Italy) Gianni Ocleppo (Ecuador) Ricardo Ycaza	6–3, 6–2
1981	(Ecuador) Andrés Gómez (Chile) Belus Prajoux	(United States) Jim Gurfein (Sweden) Anders Järryd	7–5, 6–3
1982	(Chile) Hans Gildemeister (Ecuador) Andrés Gómez	(Sweden) Anders Järryd (Sweden) Hans Simonsson	6–4, 6–2
1983	(Sweden) Stefan Simonsson (Sweden) Magnus Tideman	(Argentina) Francisco Yunis (Argentina) Juan Carlos Yunis	6–4, 6–2
1984	(Czech Republic) Pavel Složil (United States) Blaine Willenborg	(France) Loïc Courteau (France) Guy Forget	6–1, 6–4
1985	(United Kingdom) David Felgate (United Kingdom) Steve Shaw	(Belgium) Libor Pimek (United States) Blaine Willenborg	6–4, 5–7, 6–4
1986	(Spain) Jordi Arrese (Spain) David de Miguel-Lapiedra	(Haiti) Ronald Agénor (Iran) Mansour Bahrami	7–5, 6–4
1987	(Spain) Sergio Casal (Spain) Emilio Sánchez	(Australia) Darren Cahill (Australia) Mark Woodforde	6–3, 6–3
1988	(Sweden) Joakim Nyström (Italy) Claudio Panatta	(Argentina) Christian Miniussi (Italy) Diego Nargiso	6–1, 6–4
1989	(Spain) Tomás Carbonell (Peru) Carlos di Laura	(Mexico) Agustín Moreno (Peru) Jaime Yzaga	6–4, 6–4
1990	(Spain) Tomás Carbonell (Belgium) Libor Pimek	(Iran) Mansour Bahrami (France) Yannick Noah	6–3, 6–7, 6–2
1991	(France) Arnaud Boetsch (France) Guy Forget	(Germany) Patrik Kühnen (Germany) Alexander Mronz	6–2, 6–2
1992	(Spain) Sergio Casal (Spain) Emilio Sánchez	(France) Arnaud Boetsch (France) Guy Forget	6–1, 6–4
1993	(Argentina) Pablo Albano (Argentina) Javier Frana	(South Africa) David Adams (Russia) Andrei Olhovskiy	7–6, 4–6, 6–3
1994	(France) Olivier Delaître (France) Guy Forget	(Italy) Diego Nargiso (France) Guillaume Raoux	6–2, 2–6, 7–5
1995	(Croatia) Saša Hiršzon (Croatia) Goran Ivanišević	(Sweden) Henrik Holm (United Kingdom) Danny Sapsford	6–3, 6–4
Succeeded by Bournemouth International

== See also ==
- BNP Paribas Primrose Bordeaux – Challenger Tour tournament
