= Loïc Courteau =

French tennis player and coach

- Country (sports): France
- Residence: Paris, France
- Born: 6 January 1964 (age 62) Bordeaux, France
- Height: 1.75 m (5 ft 9 in)
- Plays: Right-handed
- Prize money: $113,008

Singles
- Career record: 20–34
- Career titles: 0
- Highest ranking: No. 93 (25 April 1983)

Grand Slam singles results
- Australian Open: 1R (1983)
- French Open: 2R (1982, 1984, 1987)
- Wimbledon: 3R (1983)
- US Open: 1R (1983)

Doubles
- Career record: 35–38
- Career titles: 1
- Highest ranking: No. 37 (20 July 1987)

Loïc Courteau (born 6 January 1964) is a French former tennis player. Courteau has coached the French Fed Cup team in years past, as well as Amélie Mauresmo, the winner of two Grand Slams. He reached a career-high singles ranking of world No. 93 in April 1983. He won one doubles title in his career, in 1986 at Buenos Aires partnering Horst Skoff.

== Career finals ==
=== Singles (1 loss) ===
Result	W/L	Date	Tournament	Surface	Opponent	Score
Loss	0–1	Nov 1982	Quito, Ecuador	Clay	(Ecuador) Andrés Gómez	3–6, 4–6

=== Doubles (1 win, 5 losses) ===
Result	W/L	Date	Tournament	Surface	Partner	Opponents	Score
Loss	0–1	Sep 1984	Bordeaux, France	Clay	(France) Guy Forget	(Czechoslovakia) Pavel Složil (United States) Blaine Willenborg	1–6, 4–6
Loss	0–2	Apr 1985	Nice, France	Clay	(France) Guy Forget	(Italy) Claudio Panatta (Czechoslovakia) Pavel Složil	6–3, 3–6, 6–8
Loss	0–3	Apr 1985	Marbella, Spain	Clay	(Netherlands) Michiel Schapers	(Ecuador) Andrés Gómez (Brazil) Cássio Motta	1–6, 1–6
Win	1–3	Nov 1986	Buenos Aires, Argentina	Clay	(Austria) Horst Skoff	(Argentina) Gustavo Luza (Argentina) Gustavo Tiberti	3–6, 6–4, 6–3
Loss	1–4	Nov 1986	Itaparica, Brazil	Hard	(France) Guy Forget	(United States) Chip Hooper (United States) Mike Leach	5–7, 3–6
Loss	1–5	Jul 1987	Gstaad, Switzerland	Clay	(France) Guy Forget	(Sweden) Jan Gunnarsson (Czechoslovakia) Tomáš Šmíd	6–7, 2–6
