= Libor Pimek =

Czech and Belgian tennis player

- Country (sports): Czechoslovakia; Belgium
- Residence: Sint-Niklaas, Belgium
- Born: 3 August 1963 (age 63) Most, Czechoslovakia
- Height: 1.96 m (6 ft 5 in)
- Turned pro: 1982
- Retired: 1999
- Plays: Right-handed
- Prize money: $1,509,018

Singles
- Career record: 126–121
- Career titles: 1
- Highest ranking: No. 21 (22 Apr 1985)

Grand Slam singles results
- French Open: 2R (1984)
- Wimbledon: 1R (1983, 1988)
- US Open: 3R (1987)

Doubles
- Career record: 316–356
- Career titles: 17
- Highest ranking: No. 15 (29 Jul 1996)

Grand Slam doubles results
- Australian Open: 3R (1994)
- French Open: QF (1996)
- Wimbledon: 2R (1983)
- US Open: 3R (1991)

Grand Slam mixed doubles results
- Australian Open: 1R (1991, 1996, 1997, 1998)
- French Open: QF (1991, 1996)
- Wimbledon: 2R (1991, 1992, 1993)
- US Open: 2R (1995)

Libor Pimek (born 3 August 1963) is a former professional male tennis player.

Pimek's best Grand Slam singles result came at the 1987 US Open when he reached the 3rd round, losing to Swede Mats Wilander in straight sets. He won one singles tournament during his career at the Bavarian Open, reaching a career-high ranking of world No. 21 in April 1985 (and No. 15 in doubles in July 1996).

Pimek competed as a Czechoslovak early in his career, competing for the country a few times in the Davis Cup in the mid-1980s, before representing Belgium internationally. As a Davis Cup player for Belgium, he won 4 ties (Israel 1994, Denmark and France 1997, The Netherlands 1998)

== Career finals ==
=== Singles (1 win, 1 loss) ===
| Result | W/L | Date | Tournament | Surface | Opponent | Score |
|---|---|---|---|---|---|---|
| Win | 1–0 | May 1984 | Munich, West Germany | Clay | (United States) Gene Mayer | 6–4, 4–6, 7–6, 6–4 |
| Loss | 1–1 | Nov 1985 | Vienna, Austria | Carpet | (Sweden) Jan Gunnarsson | 7–6^{(7–5)}, 2–6, 4–6, 6–1, 5–7 |

=== Doubles (17 wins, 12 losses) ===
| Result | W/L | Date | Tournament | Surface | Partner | Opponents | Score |
|---|---|---|---|---|---|---|---|
| Win | 1–0 | Mar 1983 | Nice, France | Clay | (Belgium) Bernard Boileau | (France) Bernard Fritz (France) Jean-Louis Haillet | 6–3, 6–4 |
| Win | 2–0 | Apr 1984 | Bari, Italy | Clay | (Czechoslovakia) Stanislav Birner | (United States) Marcel Freeman (United States) Tim Wilkison | 2–6, 7–6, 6–4 |
| Loss | 2–1 | Sep 1984 | Geneva, Switzerland | Clay | (Czechoslovakia) Tomáš Šmíd | (Denmark) Michael Mortensen (Sweden) Mats Wilander | 1–6, 6–3, 5–7 |
| Win | 3–1 | Jul 1985 | Boston, U.S. | Hard | (Socialist Federal Republic of Yugoslavia) Slobodan Živojinović | (Australia) Peter McNamara (United States) Paul McNamee | 2–6, 6–4, 7–6 |
| Loss | 3–2 | Sep 1985 | Bordeaux, France | Clay | (United States) Blaine Willenborg | (United Kingdom) David Felgate (United Kingdom) Steve Shaw | 4–6, 7–5, 4–6 |
| Win | 4–2 | Jun 1986 | Athens, Greece | Clay | (United States) Blaine Willenborg | (Peru) Carlos Di Laura (Italy) Claudio Panatta | 5–7, 6–4, 6–2 |
| Win | 5–2 | Aug 1986 | Saint-Vincent, France | Clay | (Czech Republic) Pavel Složil | (United States) Bud Cox (Australia) Michael Fancutt | 6–3, 6–3 |
| Win | 6–2 | Sep 1990 | Bordeaux, France | Clay | (Spain) Tomás Carbonell | (Iran) Mansour Bahrami (France) Yannick Noah | 6–3, 6–7, 6–2 |
| Loss | 6–3 | Feb 1991 | Brussels, Belgium | Carpet | (Netherlands) Michiel Schapers | (Australia) Todd Woodbridge (Australia) Mark Woodforde | 3–6, 0–6 |
| Loss | 6–4 | Aug 1991 | Prague, Czechoslovakia | Clay | (Czechoslovakia) Daniel Vacek | (Czechoslovakia) Vojtěch Flégl (Czechoslovakia) Cyril Suk | 4–6, 2–6 |
| Loss | 6–5 | Mar 1992 | Copenhagen, Denmark | Carpet | (Netherlands) Hendrik Jan Davids | (Sweden) Nicklas Kulti (Sweden) Magnus Larsson | 3–6, 4–6 |
| Win | 7–5 | Mar 1992 | Estoril, Portugal | Clay | (Netherlands) Hendrik Jan Davids | (United States) Luke Jensen (Australia) Laurie Warder | 3–6, 6–3, 7–5 |
| Win | 8–5 | Jul 1992 | Gstaad, Switzerland | Clay | (Netherlands) Hendrik Jan Davids | (Czech Republic) Petr Korda (Czech Republic) Cyril Suk | w/o |
| Loss | 8–6 | Sep 1992 | Cologne, Germany | Clay | (Sweden) Ronnie Båthman | (Argentina) Horacio de la Peña (Argentina) Gustavo Luza | 7–6, 0–6, 2–6 |
| Win | 9–6 | Jun 1993 | Florence, Italy | Clay | (Spain) Tomás Carbonell | (Netherlands) Mark Koevermans (United States) Greg Van Emburgh | 7–6, 2–6, 6–1 |
| Loss | 9–7 | Jul 1993 | Hilversum, Netherlands | Clay | (Netherlands) Hendrik Jan Davids | (Netherlands) Jacco Eltingh (Netherlands) Paul Haarhuis | 6–4, 2–6, 5–7 |
| Win | 10–7 | Aug 1993 | Prague, Czech Republic | Clay | (Netherlands) Hendrik Jan Davids | (Mexico) Jorge Lozano (Brazil) Jaime Oncins | 6–3, 7–6 |
| Win | 11–7 | Sep 1993 | Bucharest, Romania | Clay | (Netherlands) Menno Oosting | (Romania) George Cosac (Romania) Ciprian Porumb | 7–6, 7–6 |
| Loss | 11–8 | May 1995 | Bologna, Italy | Clay | (United States) Vincent Spadea | (Zimbabwe) Byron Black (United States) Jonathan Stark | 5–7, 3–6 |
| Loss | 11–9 | Jun 1995 | St. Poelten, Austria | Clay | (South Africa) Byron Talbot | (United States) Bill Behrens (United States) Matt Lucena | 5–7, 4–6 |
| Win | 12–9 | Jul 1995 | Prague, Czech Republic | Clay | (South Africa) Byron Talbot | (Czech Republic) Jiří Novák (Czech Republic) David Rikl | 7–5, 1–6, 7–6 |
| Win | 13–9 | Jan 1996 | Zagreb, Croatia | Hard(i) | (Netherlands) Menno Oosting | (Czech Republic) Martin Damm (Netherlands) Hendrik Jan Davids | 6–3, 7–6 |
| Win | 14–9 | Mar 1996 | Copenhagen, Denmark | Carpet | (South Africa) Byron Talbot | (Australia) Wayne Arthurs (Australia) Andrew Kratzmann | 7–6, 3–6, 6–3 |
| Loss | 14–10 | May 1996 | Rome, Italy | Clay | (South Africa) Byron Talbot | (Zimbabwe) Byron Black (Canada) Grant Connell | 2–6, 3–6 |
| Win | 15–10 | Jul 1996 | Stuttgart, Germany | Clay | (South Africa) Byron Talbot | (Spain) Tomás Carbonell (Spain) Francisco Roig | 6–4, 7–6 |
| Win | 16–10 | Jul 1996 | Kitzbühel, Austria | Clay | (South Africa) Byron Talbot | (South Africa) David Adams (Netherlands) Menno Oosting | 7–6, 6–3 |
| Loss | 16–11 | Mar 1997 | Rotterdam, Netherlands | Carpet | (South Africa) Byron Talbot | (Netherlands) Jacco Eltingh (Netherlands) Paul Haarhuis | 6–7, 4–6 |
| Loss | 16–12 | Jul 1997 | Hilversum, Netherlands | Clay | (Australia) Andrew Kratzmann | (Australia) Paul Kilderry (Venezuela) Nicolás Lapentti | 6–3, 5–7, 6–7 |
| Win | 17–12 | Sep 1997 | Palermo, Italy | Clay | (Australia) Andrew Kratzmann | (Netherlands) Hendrik Jan Davids (Argentina) Daniel Orsanic | 3–6, 6–3, 7–6 |
