= 1986 French Open =

- Date: 26 May – 8 June 1986
- Edition: 85
- Category: 56th Grand Slam (ITF)
- Draw: 128S/64D/64X
- Surface: Clay / outdoor
- Location: Paris (XVI^{e}), France
- Venue: Stade Roland Garros

Champions

Men's singles
- (Czechoslovakia) Ivan Lendl

Women's singles
- (United States) Chris Evert

Men's doubles
- (Australia) John Fitzgerald / (Czechoslovakia) Tomáš Šmíd

Women's doubles
- (United States) Martina Navratilova / (Hungary) Andrea Temesvári

Mixed doubles
- (United States) Kathy Jordan / (United States) Ken Flach
- French Open

The 1986 French Open was a tennis tournament that took place on the outdoor clay courts at the Stade Roland Garros in Paris, France. The tournament was held from 26 May until 8 June. It was the 85th staging of the French Open, and the first Grand Slam tennis event of 1986.

The event was part of the 1986 Nabisco Grand Prix and 1986 Virginia Slims World Championship Series.

== Finals ==
=== Men's singles ===
(Czechoslovakia) Ivan Lendl defeated (Sweden) Mikael Pernfors, 6–3, 6–2, 6–4

- It was Lendl's 6th title of the year, and his 59th overall. It was his 3rd career Grand Slam title, and his 2nd French Open title.

=== Women's singles ===
(United States) Chris Evert defeated (United States) Martina Navratilova, 2–6, 6–3, 6–3.

- It was Evert's 18th (and last) career Grand Slam title, and her 7th French Open singles title (a record).

=== Men's doubles ===
(Australia) John Fitzgerald / (Czechoslovakia) Tomáš Šmíd defeated (Sweden) Stefan Edberg / (Sweden) Anders Järryd, 6–3, 4–6, 6–3, 6–7^{(4–7)}, 14–12

=== Women's doubles ===
(United States) Martina Navratilova / (Hungary) Andrea Temesvári defeated (West Germany) Steffi Graf / (Argentina) Gabriela Sabatini, 6–1, 6–2

=== Mixed doubles ===
(United States) Kathy Jordan / (United States) Ken Flach defeated (South Africa) Rosalyn Fairbank / (Australia) Mark Edmondson, 3–6, 7–6^{(7–3)}, 6–3

== Prize money ==
Event		W	F	SF	QF	4R	3R	2R	1R
Singles	Men	FF1,397,250	FF698,630	FF349,310	FF176,980	FF102,470	FF55,890	FF32,600	FF15,720
Singles	Women	FF1,278,400	FF645,800	FF314,600	FF160,630	FF78,660	FF40,570	FF21,530	FF11,180

Total prize money for the event was FF21,528,000.

Preceded by 1985 Australian Open	Grand Slams	Succeeded by 1986 Wimbledon Championships
