= David Felgate (tennis) =

English tennis player

- Country (sports): (United Kingdom) Great Britain
- Residence: Barnes, London
- Born: 19 March 1964 (age 61); Essex, England
- Height: 5 ft 11 in (180 cm)
- Turned pro: 1983
- Retired: 1989
- Plays: Right-handed

Singles
- Career record: 1–4
- Career titles: 0
- Highest ranking: No. 301 (11 July 1988)

Grand Slam singles results
- Australian Open: 1R (1988)
- Wimbledon: 1R (1988)

Doubles
- Career record: 9–25
- Career titles: 1
- Highest ranking: No. 83 (5 May 1986)

Grand Slam doubles results
- Australian Open: 1R (1987, 1988)
- French Open: 1R (1986)
- Wimbledon: 2R (1985, 1986, 1988)
- US Open: 1R (1988)

Mixed doubles

Grand Slam mixed doubles results
- French Open: 2R (1986)
- Wimbledon: 1R (1986, 1989)

David Felgate (born 19 March 1964) is a former English professional tennis player who competed for Great Britain in the 1980s.

== Career ==
Felgate was principally a doubles player and it was in doubles that he made the semi-finals of the boys' event at the 1982 US Open, partnering Stuart Bale.

He and fellow Englishman Steve Shaw were doubles champions in the 1985 Bordeaux Open. It would be his only title on the Grand Prix tennis circuit. Also that year, in Wimbledon, Felgate won his first Grand Slam doubles match. Felgate and Nick Brown, wild card entrants, upset third seeds Ken Flach and Robert Seguso in the first round, before losing in the second round. He also reached the second round at Wimbledon in 1986, with Shaw, and in 1988, with Nick Fulwood.

He made his first Grand Slam singles appearance in 1988. After going through qualifying, Felgate played against Eddie Edwards in the first round of the 1988 Australian Open. He lost heavily to the South African, only winning three games during the match. He had previously only played singles on the Challenger circuit, and never in a Grand Prix event. When he did debut at a Grand Prix tournament, in the 1988 Stella Artois Championships, Felgate defeated world number 72 Jérôme Potier. He was given a wild card at Wimbledon that year, but had to play top seed Ivan Lendl in the first round, and lost in straight sets.

In 1992, Felgate started coaching Tim Henman and remained with him for nine years. During this time Henman made two Wimbledon semi-finals and won seven ATP titles. They decided to part ways in April 2001 and Felgate then began working with Xavier Malisse. He has also spent time coaching Naomi Cavaday and Nicole Vaidišová.

He has had a long association with the Lawn Tennis Association. He was Manager of Men's National Training there from 1992 until 1996 and their Performance Director from 2003 to 2006.

== Grand Prix career finals ==
=== Doubles: 1 (1–0) ===
Result	W/L	Date	Tournament	Surface	Partner	Opponents	Score
Win	1–0	Sep 1985	Bordeaux, France	Clay	(United Kingdom) Steve Shaw	(Czechoslovakia) Libor Pimek (United States) Blaine Willenborg	6–4, 5–7, 6–4

== Challenger titles ==
=== Doubles: (4) ===
No.	Year	Tournament	Surface	Partner	Opponents	Score
1.	1986	Nairobi, Kenya	Clay	(United Kingdom) Nick Fulwood	(United States) Marcel Freeman (United States) Jacques Manset	6–2, 7–6
2.	1986	Lisbon, Portugal	Clay	(New Zealand) Bruce Derlin	(Italy) Alessandro de Minicis (Socialist Federal Republic of Yugoslavia) Marko Ostoja	5–7, 6–3, 6–4
3.	1987	Bloemfontein, South Africa	Hard	(United Kingdom) Nick Fulwood	(United States) Mike Bauer (United States) Peter Palandjian	6–1, 3–6, 6–4
4.	1988	Madeira, Portugal	Hard	(United Kingdom) Nick Fulwood	(United States) Jon Levine (Nigeria) Nduka Odizor	7–5, 7–5
