= Blaine Willenborg =

American tennis player (born 1960)

- Country (sports): United States
- Born: January 4, 1960 (age 66) Miami, Florida, U.S.
- Height: 1.70 m (5 ft 7 in)
- Plays: Right-handed
- Prize money: $249,307

Singles
- Career record: 33–54
- Career titles: 0
- Highest ranking: No. 50 (10 September 1984)

Grand Slam singles results
- French Open: 2R (1985)
- Wimbledon: 1R (1984)
- US Open: 2R (1980)

Doubles
- Career record: 142–105
- Career titles: 7
- Highest ranking: No. 13 (18 April 1988)

Grand Slam doubles results
- French Open: QF (1985, 1987, 1989)
- Wimbledon: 1R (1984, 1989)
- US Open: QF (1988)
Medal record
Tennis
Summer Universiade
Silver medal – second place	1979 Mexico City	Doubles

Blaine Willenborg (born January 4, 1960) is a former professional tennis player from the United States.

Willenborg enjoyed most of his tennis success while playing doubles. During his career he won 7 doubles titles and finished runner-up an additional 9 times. He achieved a career-high doubles ranking of world No. 13 in 1988. His career high singles ranking was world No. 50, which he reached on September 9, 1984.

== Career finals ==
=== Doubles: 15 (7 titles / 9 runner-ups) ===
Result	W-L	Date	Tournament	Surface	Partner	Opponents	Score
Loss	0–1	Aug 1982	South Orange, U.S.	Clay	(United States) Jai DiLouie	(Mexico) Raúl Ramírez (United States) Van Winitsky	6–3, 4–6, 1–6
Loss	0–2	Aug 1982	Indianapolis, U.S.	Clay	(South Africa) Robbie Venter	(United States) Sherwood Stewart (United States) Ferdi Taygan	4–6, 5–7
Win	1–2	Sep 1983	Geneva, Switzerland	Clay	(Czechoslovakia) Stanislav Birner	(Sweden) Joakim Nyström (Sweden) Mats Wilander	6–1, 2–6, 6–3
Loss	1–3	Jul 1984	Washington D.C., U.S.	Clay	(United States) Drew Gitlin	(Czechoslovakia) Pavel Složil (United States) Ferdi Taygan	6–7, 1–6
Loss	1–4	Jul 1984	North Conway, U.S.	Clay	(Brazil) Cássio Motta	(United States) Brian Gottfried (Czechoslovakia) Tomáš Šmíd	4–6, 2–6
Win	2–4	Sep 1984	Palermo, Italy	Clay	(Czechoslovakia) Tomáš Šmíd	(Italy) Claudio Panatta (Sweden) Henrik Sundström	6–7, 6–3, 6–0
Win	3–4	Sep 1984	Bordeaux, France	Clay	(Czechoslovakia) Pavel Složil	(France) Loïc Courteau (France) Guy Forget	6–1, 6–4
Loss	3–5	Sep 1985	Bordeaux, France	Clay	(Czechoslovakia) Libor Pimek	(United Kingdom) David Felgate (United Kingdom) Steve Shaw	4–6, 7–5, 4–6
Loss	3–6	Jun 1986	Bologna, Italy	Clay	(Italy) Claudio Panatta	(Italy) Paolo Canè (Italy) Simone Colombo	1–6, 2–6
Win	4–6	Jun 1986	Athens, Greece	Clay	(Czechoslovakia) Libor Pimek	(Peru) Carlos Di Laura (Italy) Claudio Panatta	5–7, 6–4, 6–2
Win	5–6	May 1987	Munich, Germany	Clay	(United States) Jim Pugh	(Spain) Sergio Casal (Spain) Emilio Sánchez	7–6, 4–6, 6–4
Loss	5–7	Jun 1987	Bologna, Italy	Clay	(Italy) Claudio Panatta	(Spain) Sergio Casal (Spain) Emilio Sánchez	3–6, 2–6
Win	6–7	Jul 1987	Indianapolis, U.S.	Clay	(Australia) Laurie Warder	(Sweden) Joakim Nyström (Sweden) Mats Wilander	6–0, 6–3
Loss	6–8	Aug 1987	Washington D.C., U.S.	Hard	(Australia) Laurie Warder	(United States) Gary Donnelly (United States) Peter Fleming	2–6, 6–7
Loss	6–9	Feb 1988	Lyon, France	Carpet	(Denmark) Michael Mortensen	(Australia) Brad Drewett (Australia) Broderick Dyke	6–3, 3–6, 4–6
Win	7–9	May 1989	Florence, Italy	Clay	(United States) Mike De Palmer	(Italy) Pietro Pennisi (Italy) Simone Restelli	4–6, 6–4, 6–4
