= 1985 Bologna Open – Singles =

Singles
- 1985 Bologna Open

Final
- Champion: (France) Thierry Tulasne
- Runner-up: (Italy) Claudio Panatta
- Score: 6–2, 6–0

Details
- Draw: 32 (4WC/4Q)
- Seeds: 8

Events
Singles	Doubles
Bologna Outdoor	· 1986 →

In the first edition of the tournament, Thierry Tulasne won the tournament by defeating Claudio Panatta 6–2, 6–0 in the final.

== Seeds ==
1. (Italy) Francesco Cancellotti (first round)
2. (Argentina) Guillermo Vilas (first round)
3. (France) Thierry Tulasne (champion)
4. (Italy) Claudio Panatta (final)
5. (Uruguay) Diego Pérez (first round)
6. (Spain) Fernando Luna (second round)
7. (Brazil) Givaldo Barbosa (first round)
8. (Germany) Damir Keretić (semifinals)

== Draw ==
=== Key ===
- Q = Qualifier
- WC = Wild card
- LL = Lucky loser
- Alt = Alternate
- SE = Special exempt
- PR = Protected ranking
- ITF = ITF entry
- JE = Junior exempt
- w/o = Walkover
- r = Retired
- d = Defaulted
- SR = Special ranking

=== Finals ===
Semifinals
(Spain) Alberto Tous	6	3
4	(Italy) Claudio Panatta	7	6
3/WC	(France) Thierry Tulasne	6	6
8	(West Germany) Damir Keretić	0	4

Final
4	(Italy) Claudio Panatta	2	0
3/WC	(France) Thierry Tulasne	6	6

=== Top half ===
First round
1	(Italy) F Cancellotti	6	5	3
(Brazil) M Hocevar	2	7	6
(Brazil) D Campos	4	6	3
(Spain) A Tous	6	2	6
(Australia) J Alexander	1	4
(France) P Portes	6	6
(Hungary) Z Kuhárszky	3	6	7
7	(Brazil) G Barbosa	6	1	6
4	(Italy) C Panatta	6	6
Q	(Italy) Luca Gasparini	1	2
(Australia) C Limberger	4	2
(Ecuador) R Viver	6	6
Q	(Italy) C Aprili	6	2	1
WC	(Italy) S Colombo	4	6	6
Q	(Italy) M Narducci	6	6
5	(Uruguay) D Pérez	4	2

Second round
(Brazil) M Hocevar	4	5
(Spain) A Tous	6	7
(France) P Portes	3	6
(Hungary) Z Kuhárszky	6	7
4	(Italy) C Panatta	4	7	6
(Ecuador) R Viver	6	6	3
WC	(Italy) S Colombo	2	3
Q	(Italy) M Narducci	6	6

Quarterfinals
(Spain) A Tous	6	6
(Hungary) Z Kuhárszky	4	1
4	(Italy) C Panatta	6	6	6
Q	(Italy) M Narducci	7	2	3

Semifinals
(Spain) A Tous	6	3
4	(Italy) C Panatta	7	6

=== Bottom half ===
First round
6	(Spain) F Luna	5	6	6
(Italy) M Cierro	7	3	1
Q	(Haiti) R Agénor	6	7
WC	(Italy) P Canè	4	6
(Argentina) C Miniussi	2	4
(West Germany) P Elter	6	6
(Spain) J Arrese	4	3
3/WC	(France) T Tulasne	6	6
8	(West Germany) D Keretić	4	6	6
(Italy) L Bottazzi	6	4	0
(Italy) A de Minicis	3	7	4
(Brazil) I Kley	6	6	6
(Argentina) F Yunis	2	1
(Switzerland) C Mezzadri	6	6
(Socialist Federal Republic of Yugoslavia) G Prpić	6	6
2/WC	(Argentina) G Vilas	3	4

Second round
6	(Spain) F Luna	6	3
Q	(Haiti) R Agénor	7	6
(West Germany) P Elter	2	3
3/WC	(France) T Tulasne	6	6
8	(West Germany) D Keretić	6	6
(Brazil) I Kley	0	3
(Switzerland) C Mezzadri	2	2
(Socialist Federal Republic of Yugoslavia) G Prpić	6	6

Quarterfinals
Q	(Haiti) R Agénor	2	6	4
3/WC	(France) T Tulasne	6	3	6
8	(West Germany) D Keretić	6	3	6
(Socialist Federal Republic of Yugoslavia) G Prpić	4	6	4

Semifinals
3/WC	(France) T Tulasne	6	6
8	(West Germany) D Keretić	0	4
