= 1989 Campionati Internazionali di Sicilia – Singles =

Singles
- 1989 Campionati Internazionali di Sicilia

Final
- Champion: (Argentina) Guillermo Pérez Roldán
- Runner-up: (Spain) Paolo Canè
- Score: 6–1, 6–4

Details
- Draw: 32 (2WC/4Q)
- Seeds: 8

Events
Singles	Doubles
← 1988 ·	Campionati Internazionali di Sicilia	· 1990 →

Mats Wilander was the defending champion, but did not compete this year.

Guillermo Pérez Roldán won the title by defeating Paolo Canè 6–1, 6–4 in the final.

== Seeds ==
1. (Argentina) Alberto Mancini (quarterfinals)
2. (Argentina) Martín Jaite (first round)
3. (Austria) Thomas Muster (first round)
4. (Italy) Paolo Canè (final)
5. (Spain) Sergi Bruguera (quarterfinals)
6. (Ecuador) Andrés Gómez (first round)
7. (Argentina) Guillermo Pérez Roldán (champion)
8. (Socialist Federal Republic of Yugoslavia) Goran Ivanišević (semifinals)

== Draw ==
=== Key ===
- Q = Qualifier
- WC = Wild card
- LL = Lucky loser
- Alt = Alternate
- SE = Special exempt
- PR = Protected ranking
- ITF = ITF entry
- JE = Junior exempt
- w/o = Walkover
- r = Retired
- d = Defaulted
- SR = Special ranking

=== Finals ===
Semifinals
8	(Socialist Federal Republic of Yugoslavia) Goran Ivanišević	4	3
4	(Italy) Paolo Canè	6	6
Q	(West Germany) Pavel Vojtíšek	6	4	1
7	(Argentina) Guillermo Pérez Roldán	4	6	6

Final
4	(Italy) Paolo Canè	1	4
7	(Argentina) Guillermo Pérez Roldán	6	6

=== Top half ===
First round
1	(Argentina) A Mancini	6	6
(Spain) C Costa	2	1
(Austria) S Lochbihler	6	6
(Italy) F Cancellotti	4	4
(Italy) S Colombo	6	6
(Italy) M Cierro	2	1
WC	(Sweden) J Myström	1	6	0
8	(Socialist Federal Republic of Yugoslavia) G Ivanišević	6	4	6
4	(Italy) P Canè	7	6
(Spain) F Roig	6	4
(Argentina) G Giussani	6	2
(West Germany) R Osterthun	7	6
(Argentina) R Azar	6	6
WC	(Czechoslovakia) T Šmíd	3	3
Q	(West Germany) P Ballauff	6	3	6
6	(Ecuador) A Gómez	0	6	4

Second round
1	(Argentina) A Mancini	6	6
(Austria) S Lochbihler	4	0
(Italy) S Colombo	4	6
8	(Socialist Federal Republic of Yugoslavia) G Ivanišević	6	7
4	(Italy) P Canè	4	6	6
(West Germany) R Osterthun	6	3	3
(Argentina) R Azar	4	4
Q	(West Germany) P Ballauff	6	6

Quarterfinals
1	(Argentina) A Mancini	6	5	4
8	(Socialist Federal Republic of Yugoslavia) G Ivanišević	3	7	6
4	(Italy) P Canè	6	6	7
Q	(West Germany) P Ballauff	7	1	5

Semifinals
8	(Socialist Federal Republic of Yugoslavia) G Ivanišević	4	3
4	(Italy) P Canè	6	6

=== Bottom half ===
First round
5	(Spain) S Bruguera	4	6	6
Q	(Spain) G López	6	3	4
(Peru) A Aramburú	1	1
(Uruguay) D Pérez	6	6
(Italy) O Camporese	6	5	6
(West Germany) U Riglewski	3	7	3
Q	(West Germany) P Vojtíšek	6	6
3	(Austria) T Muster	4	1
7	(Argentina) G Pérez Roldán	7	6
(Czechoslovakia) J Čihák	6	2
(Italy) D Nargiso	6	6
(Switzerland) C Mezzadri	7	7
(Italy) C Pistolesi	3	6	7
(West Germany) J Wöhrmann	6	3	5
Q	(Italy) S Pescosolido	6	6	6
2	(Argentina) M Jaite	3	7	3

Second round
5	(Spain) S Bruguera	6	7
(Uruguay) D Pérez	3	6
(Italy) O Camporese	1	0
Q	(West Germany) P Vojtíšek	6	6
7	(Argentina) G Pérez Roldán	3	6	6
(Switzerland) C Mezzadri	6	3	3
(Italy) C Pistolesi	7	6
Q	(Italy) S Pescosolido	5	3

Quarterfinals
5	(Spain) S Bruguera	6	4
Q	(West Germany) P Vojtíšek	7	6
7	(Argentina) G Pérez Roldán	6	6
(Italy) C Pistolesi	4	1

Semifinals
Q	(West Germany) P Vojtíšek	6	4	1
7	(Argentina) G Pérez Roldán	4	6	6
