= 1987 Campionati Internazionali di Sicilia – Singles =

Singles
- 1987 Campionati Internazionali di Sicilia

Final
- Champion: (Argentina) Martín Jaite
- Runner-up: (Czechoslovakia) Karel Nováček
- Score: 7–6^{(7–5)}, 6–7^{(7–9)}, 6–4

Details
- Draw: 32 (2WC/4Q)
- Seeds: 8

Events
Singles	Doubles
← 1986 ·	Campionati Internazionali di Sicilia	· 1988 →

Ulf Stenlund was the defending champion, but lost in the first round to Josef Čihák.

Martín Jaite won the title by defeating Karel Nováček 7–6^{(7–5)}, 6–7^{(7–9)}, 6–4 in the final.

== Seeds ==
1. (Argentina) Martín Jaite (champion)
2. (Argentina) Guillermo Pérez Roldán (second round)
3. (Czechoslovakia) Tomáš Šmíd (first round)
4. (Sweden) Ulf Stenlund (first round)
5. (West Germany) Andreas Maurer (first round)
6. (France) Thierry Tulasne (second round)
7. (Czechoslovakia) Karel Nováček (final)
8. (Argentina) Horacio de la Peña (second round)

== Draw ==
=== Key ===
- Q = Qualifier
- WC = Wild card
- LL = Lucky loser
- Alt = Alternate
- SE = Special exempt
- PR = Protected ranking
- ITF = ITF entry
- JE = Junior exempt
- w/o = Walkover
- r = Retired
- d = Defaulted
- SR = Special ranking

=== Finals ===
Semifinals
1	(Argentina) Martín Jaite	6	6
(Czechoslovakia) Josef Čihák	2	3
(West Germany) Damir Keretić	2	3
7	(Czechoslovakia) Karel Nováček	6	6

Final
1	(Argentina) Martín Jaite	7^{7}	6^{7}	6
7	(Czechoslovakia) Karel Nováček	6^{5}	7^{9}	4

=== Top half ===
First round
1	(Argentina) M Jaite	7	6
(Italy) C Pistolesi	5	2
(Peru) P Arraya	6	6
(Argentina) R Argüello	4	1
(United States) L Duncan	6	6
(Spain) D de Miguel	0	1
WC	(Italy) C Panatta	6	6	3
8	(Argentina) H de la Peña	4	7	6
4	(Sweden) U Stenlund	3	1
(Czechoslovakia) J Čihák	6	6
Q	(Uruguay) M Filippini	6	6
(Italy) S Colombo	1	1
(Sweden) J Windahl	3	6
(Argentina) C Miniussi	6	7
Q	(Argentina) A Mancini	6	6
5	(West Germany) A Maurer	2	1

Second round
1	(Argentina) M Jaite	6	6
(Peru) P Arraya	1	3
(United States) L Duncan	6	6
8	(Argentina) H de la Peña	2	3
(Czechoslovakia) J Čihák	7	6
Q	(Uruguay) M Filippini	6	4
(Argentina) C Miniussi	7	6
Q	(Argentina) A Mancini	5	2

Quarterfinals
1	(Argentina) M Jaite	7	6
(United States) L Duncan	6	3
(Czechoslovakia) J Čihák	7	7
(Argentina) C Miniussi	5	6

Semifinals
1	(Argentina) M Jaite	6	6
(Czechoslovakia) J Čihák	2	3

=== Bottom half ===
First round
6	(France) T Tulasne	6	6
(Italy) F Cancellotti	1	2
(United States) J Brown	6	6
(West Germany) W Popp	4	1
(Czechoslovakia) L Pimek	0	5
WC	(Italy) D Nargiso	6	7
(West Germany) D Keretić	7	7
3	(Czechoslovakia) T Šmíd	6	6
7	(Czechoslovakia) K Nováček	6	2	6
(Mexico) L Lavalle	1	6	1
(Argentina) F Davín	6	6
(Italy) M Cierro	3	4
(Spain) J Arrese	6	6
Q	(Italy) A Baldoni	4	1
Q	(Spain) JC Báguena	3	1
2	(Argentina) G Pérez Roldán	6	6

Second round
6	(France) T Tulasne	7	3	1
(United States) J Brown	5	6	6
WC	(Italy) D Nargiso	2	4
(West Germany) D Keretić	6	6
7	(Czechoslovakia) K Nováček	6	4	6
(Argentina) F Davín	0	6	2
(Spain) J Arrese	6	6
2	(Argentina) G Pérez Roldán	1	3

Quarterfinals
(United States) J Brown	0	3
(West Germany) D Keretić	6	6
7	(Czechoslovakia) K Nováček	6	1	6
(Spain) J Arrese	3	6	3

Semifinals
(West Germany) D Keretić	2	3
7	(Czechoslovakia) K Nováček	6	6
