= 1989 Campionati Internazionali di Sicilia – Doubles =

Doubles
- 1989 Campionati Internazionali di Sicilia

Final
- Champions: (West Germany) Peter Ballauff (West Germany) Rüdiger Haas
- Runners-up: (Socialist Federal Republic of Yugoslavia) Goran Ivanišević (Italy) Diego Nargiso
- Score: 6–2, 6–7, 6–4

Events
Singles	Doubles
← 1988 ·	Campionati Internazionali di Sicilia	· 1990 →

Carlos di Laura and Marcelo Filippini were the defending champions, but none competed this year.

Peter Ballauff and Rüdiger Haas won the title by defeating Goran Ivanišević and Diego Nargiso 6–2, 6–7, 6–4 in the final.

== Seeds ==
1. (Czechoslovakia) Tomáš Šmíd / (Hungary) Balázs Taróczy (first round)
2. (Socialist Federal Republic of Yugoslavia) Goran Ivanišević / (Italy) Diego Nargiso (final)
3. (Italy) Simone Colombo / (Switzerland) Claudio Mezzadri (semifinals)
4. (West Germany) Ricki Osterthun / (West Germany) Udo Riglewski (first round)

== Draw ==
=== Key ===
- Q = Qualifier
- WC = Wild card
- LL = Lucky loser
- Alt = Alternate
- SE = Special exempt
- PR = Protected ranking
- ITF = ITF entry
- JE = Junior exempt
- w/o = Walkover
- r = Retired
- d = Defaulted
- SR = Special ranking

=== Draw ===
First round
1	(Czechoslovakia) T Šmíd (Hungary) B Taróczy	6	4	3
(West Germany) P Ballauff (West Germany) R Haas	2	6	6
(Spain) F Roig (Spain) B Uribe	6	6	6
(Argentina) G Giussani (Argentina) G Mirad	7	1	3
4	(West Germany) R Osterthun (West Germany) U Riglewski	1	1
(Italy) C Caratti (Italy) F Mordegan	6	6
(Spain) C Costa (Argentina) M Jaite	4	1
(Italy) M Boscatto (Italy) S Pescosolido	6	6
(Italy) P Canè (Italy) M Fioroni	6	6
(Czechoslovakia) J Čihák (Sweden) J Nyström	4	4
(United States) B Buffington (Italy) C Pistolesi	2	3
3	(Italy) S Colombo (Switzerland) C Mezzadri	6	6
(Argentina) A Mancini (Uruguay) D Pérez	7	7
(Italy) M Cierro (Ecuador) R Viver	5	6
(New Zealand) Andrew Lobb (Australia) Kurt Robinson	4	3
2	(Socialist Federal Republic of Yugoslavia) G Ivanišević (Italy) D Nargiso	6	6

Quarterfinals
(West Germany) P Ballauff (West Germany) R Haas	1	6	6
(Spain) F Roig (Spain) B Uribe	6	4	4
(Italy) C Caratti (Italy) F Mordegan	5	7	6
(Italy) M Boscatto (Italy) S Pescosolido	7	6	4
(Italy) P Canè (Italy) M Fioroni	6	1	2
3	(Italy) S Colombo (Switzerland) C Mezzadri	4	6	6
(Argentina) A Mancini (Uruguay) D Pérez	3	6
2	(Socialist Federal Republic of Yugoslavia) G Ivanišević (Italy) D Nargiso	6	7

Semifinals
(West Germany) P Ballauff (West Germany) R Haas	6	6
(Italy) C Caratti (Italy) F Mordegan	4	4
3	(Italy) S Colombo (Switzerland) C Mezzadri	4	4
2	(Socialist Federal Republic of Yugoslavia) G Ivanišević (Italy) D Nargiso	6	6

Final
(West Germany) P Ballauff (West Germany) R Haas	6	6	6
2	(Socialist Federal Republic of Yugoslavia) G Ivanišević (Italy) D Nargiso	2	7	4
