= 1988 Monte Carlo Open – Doubles =

Doubles
- 1988 Monte Carlo Open

Final
- Champions: (Spain) Sergio Casal (Spain) Emilio Sánchez
- Runners-up: (France) Henri Leconte (Czechoslovakia) Ivan Lendl
- Score: 6–1, 6–3

Details
- Draw: 24 (2WC)
- Seeds: 8

Events
Singles	Doubles
- Monte-Carlo Masters

Hans Gildemeister and Andrés Gómez were the defending champions, but lost in the second round to Henri Leconte and Ivan Lendl.

Sergio Casal and Emilio Sánchez won the title by defeating Leconte and Lendl 6–1, 6–3 in the final.

== Seeds ==
All eight seeds received a bye to the second round.

1. (Spain) Sergio Casal / (Spain) Emilio Sánchez (champions)
2. (France) Guy Forget / (Socialist Federal Republic of Yugoslavia) Slobodan Živojinović (second round)
3. (Sweden) Joakim Nyström / (Czechoslovakia) Tomáš Šmíd (second round)
4. (Chile) Hans Gildemeister / (Ecuador) Andrés Gómez (second round)
5. (United States) Rick Leach / (United States) Jim Pugh (quarterfinals)
6. (Australia) Darren Cahill / (Australia) Laurie Warder (second round)
7. (Switzerland) Claudio Mezzadri / (Denmark) Michael Mortensen (second round)
8. (Iran) Mansour Bahrami / (Uruguay) Diego Pérez (second round)

== Draw ==
Key

- Q = Qualifier
- WC = Wild card
- LL = Lucky loser
- Alt = Alternate
- ITF = ITF entry
- PR = Protected ranking
- SR = Special ranking
- SE = Special exempt
- JE = Junior exempt
- JR = Junior Accelerator Programme entrant
- CO = College Accelerator Programme entrant
- NG = Next Gen Accelerator Program entrant
- w/o = Walkover
- r = Retired
- d = Defaulted

=== Finals ===
Semifinals
1	(Spain) Sergio Casal (Spain) Emilio Sánchez	6	4	6
(Australia) Wally Masur (Australia) Mark Woodforde	4	6	1
WC	(France) Henri Leconte (Czechoslovakia) Ivan Lendl	6	1	7
(Australia) Carl Limberger (Italy) Claudio Panatta	1	6	6

Final
1	(Spain) Sergio Casal (Spain) Emilio Sánchez	6	6
WC	(France) Henri Leconte (Czechoslovakia) Ivan Lendl	0	3

=== Top half ===
First round
(West Germany) E Jelen (West Germany) P Kühnen	4	4
(Italy) P Canè (Czechoslovakia) P Korda	6	6
(United States) J Arias (United States) L Jensen	7	2	4
(Spain) J Sánchez (Netherlands) M Schapers	6	6	6
(Sweden) J Svensson (Sweden) M Tideman	5	6	3
WC	(Switzerland) H Günthardt (Hungary) B Taróczy	7	1	6
(Australia) W Masur (Australia) M Woodforde	6	6
(Italy) D Nargiso (West Germany) CU Steeb	4	3

Second round
1	(Spain) S Casal (Spain) E Sánchez	6	6
(Italy) P Canè (Czechoslovakia) P Korda	4	1
(Spain) J Sánchez (Netherlands) M Schapers	2	7	7
7	(Switzerland) C Mezzadri (Denmark) M Mortensen	7	6	6
3	(Sweden) J Nyström (Czechoslovakia) T Šmíd	4	3
WC	(Switzerland) H Günthardt (Hungary) B Taróczy	6	6
(Australia) W Masur (Australia) M Woodforde	7	6
6	(Australia) D Cahill (Australia) L Warder	5	3

Quarterfinals
1	(Spain) S Casal (Spain) E Sánchez	6	7
(Spain) J Sánchez (Netherlands) M Schapers	4	5
WC	(Switzerland) H Günthardt (Hungary) B Taróczy	4	3
(Australia) W Masur (Australia) M Woodforde	6	6

Semifinals
1	(Spain) S Casal (Spain) E Sánchez	6	4	6
(Australia) W Masur (Australia) M Woodforde	4	6	1

=== Bottom half ===
First round
(Spain) J López-Maeso (Spain) A Tous	3	7	3
(Czechoslovakia) J Čihák (Czechoslovakia) C Suk	6	5	6
(Czechoslovakia) S Birner (Czechoslovakia) J Navrátil	3	4
WC	(France) H Leconte (Czechoslovakia) I Lendl	6	6
(West Germany) T Meinecke (West Germany) R Osterthun	1	7	6
(Australia) B Dyke (Netherlands) T Nijssen	6	6	3
(Sweden) J Gunnarsson (Sweden) P Lundgren	4	6
(Australia) C Limberger (Italy) C Panatta	6	7

Second round
5	(United States) R Leach (United States) J Pugh	6	7
(Czechoslovakia) J Čihák (Czechoslovakia) C Suk	3	6
WC	(France) H Leconte (Czechoslovakia) I Lendl	6	6
4	(Chile) H Gildemeister (Ecuador) A Gómez	3	0
8	(Iran) M Bahrami (Uruguay) D Pérez	2	2
(West Germany) T Meinecke (West Germany) R Osterthun	6	6
(Australia) C Limberger (Italy) C Panatta	7	6	6
2	(France) G Forget (Socialist Federal Republic of Yugoslavia) S Živojinović	6	7	4

Quarterfinals
5	(United States) R Leach (United States) J Pugh	2	6	5
WC	(France) H Leconte (Czechoslovakia) I Lendl	6	4	7
(West Germany) T Meinecke (West Germany) R Osterthun	4	2
(Australia) C Limberger (Italy) C Panatta	6	6

Semifinals
WC	(France) H Leconte (Czechoslovakia) I Lendl	6	1	7
(Australia) C Limberger (Italy) C Panatta	1	6	6
