= 1989 Athens Open – Doubles =

Doubles
- 1989 Athens Open

Final
- Champions: (Italy) Claudio Panatta; (Czechoslovakia) Tomáš Šmíd
- Runners-up: (Argentina) Gustavo Giussani; (Argentina) Gerardo Mirad
- Score: 6–3, 6–2

Events
Singles	Doubles
← 1988 ·	ATP Athens Open	· 1990 →

Rikard Bergh and Per Henricsson were the defending champions but did not compete that year.

Claudio Panatta and Tomáš Šmíd won in the final 6–3, 6–2 against Gustavo Giussani and Gerardo Mirad.

== Seeds ==
1. (Italy) Claudio Panatta / (Czechoslovakia) Tomáš Šmíd (champions)
2. (Czechoslovakia) Josef Čihák / (Argentina) Christian Miniussi (quarterfinals)
3. (West Germany) Martin Sinner / (West Germany) Michael Stich (semifinals)
4. (Italy) Massimo Cierro / (Italy) Alessandro de Minicis (quarterfinals)

== Draw ==
=== Key ===
- Q = Qualifier
- WC = Wild card
- LL = Lucky loser
- Alt = Alternate
- SE = Special exempt
- PR = Protected ranking
- ITF = ITF entry
- JE = Junior exempt
- w/o = Walkover
- r = Retired
- d = Defaulted
- SR = Special ranking

First round

Quarterfinals

Semifinals

Final

1
- (Italy) C Panatta
- (Czechoslovakia) T Šmíd
6
6

- (Spain) J Colás
- (Spain) F Luna
0
2

1
- (Italy) C Panatta
- (Czechoslovakia) T Šmíd
1
1

- (Spain) J Aguilera
- (Spain) A Tous
6
7

- (Spain) J Aguilera
- (Spain) A Tous
6
0
r

- (West Germany) H Schwaier
- (West Germany) P Vojtisek
2
6

1
- (Italy) C Panatta
- (Czechoslovakia) T Šmíd
6
6

3
- (West Germany) M Sinner
- (West Germany) M Stich
6
6

3
- (West Germany) M Sinner
- (West Germany) M Stich
1
3

- (Romania) A Dîrzu
- (Greece) F Vazeos
4
2

3
- (West Germany) M Sinner
- (West Germany) M Stich
7
6

- (Romania) G Cosac
- (Romania) F Segărceanu
6
6

- (Romania) G Cosac
- (Romania) F Segărceanu
6
4

- (Haiti) R Agénor
- (United States) L Duncan
2
2

1
- (Italy) C Panatta
- (Czechoslovakia) T Šmíd
6
6

- (France) T Champion
- (France) F Errard
6
4
6

- (Argentina) G Giussani
- (Argentina) G Mirad
3
2

- (West Germany) P Ballauff
- (Czechoslovakia) M Střelba
2
6
0

- (France) T Champion
- (France) F Errard
6
5
6

- (Argentina) R Azar
- (Argentina) F Davín
5
5

4
- (Italy) M Cierro
- (Italy) A de Minicis
3
7
4

4
- (Italy) M Cierro
- (Italy) A de Minicis
7
7

- (France) T Champion
- (France) F Errard
2
3

- (West Germany) T Meinecke
- (West Germany) A Thoms
4
5

- (Argentina) G Giussani
- (Argentina) G Mirad
6
6

- (Argentina) G Giussani
- (Argentina) G Mirad
6
7

- (Argentina) G Giussani
- (Argentina) G Mirad
6
6

- (Greece) G Kalovelonis
- (Romania) A Marcu
1
1

2
- (Czechoslovakia) J Čihák
- (Argentina) C Miniussi
4
3

2
- (Czechoslovakia) J Čihák
- (Argentina) C Miniussi
6
6
