= 1989 Athens Open – Singles =

Singles
- 1989 Athens Open

Final
- Champion: (Haiti) Ronald Agénor
- Runner-up: (Sweden) Kent Carlsson
- Score: 6–3, 6–4

Details
- Draw: 32
- Seeds: 8

Events
| Singles | Doubles |
| ← 1988 · | ATP Athens Open | · 1990 → |

Horst Skoff was the defending champion but did not compete that year.

Ronald Agénor won in the final 6–3, 6–4 against Kent Carlsson.

== Seeds ==
1. (Sweden) Kent Carlsson (final)
2. (Haiti) Ronald Agénor (champion)
3. (United States) Lawson Duncan (quarterfinals)
4. (Spain) Fernando Luna (first round)
5. (Soviet Union) Andres Võsand (first round)
6. (Czechoslovakia) Martin Střelba (quarterfinals)
7. (West Germany) Ricki Osterthun (second round)
8. (Italy) Francesco Cancellotti (quarterfinals)

== Draw ==
=== Key ===
- Q = Qualifier
- WC = Wild card
- LL = Lucky loser
- Alt = Alternate
- SE = Special exempt
- PR = Protected ranking
- ITF = ITF entry
- JE = Junior exempt
- w/o = Walkover
- r = Retired
- d = Defaulted
- SR = Special ranking

=== Finals ===
Semifinals
1 | (Sweden) Kent Carlsson | 6 | 5 | 6
(Czechoslovakia) Josef Čihák | 2 | 7 | 4
(Argentina) Franco Davín | 6 | 3 | 5
2 | (Haiti) Ronald Agénor | 4 | 6 | 7

Final
1 | (Sweden) Kent Carlsson | 3 | 4
2 | (Haiti) Ronald Agénor | 6 | 6

=== Top half ===
First round
1 | (Sweden) K Carlsson | 6 | 6
Q | (West Germany) M Sinner | 2 | 0
(Spain) E Osta | 3 | 6 | 3
(Argentina) G Giussani | 6 | 2 | 6
Q | (Italy) A de Minicis | 1 | 1
(France) T Champion | 6 | 6
WC | (Spain) S Bruguera | 3 | 2
7 | (West Germany) R Osterthun | 6 | 6
4 | (Spain) F Luna | 6 | 6 | 3
(Czechoslovakia) J Čihák | 7 | 3 | 6
Q | (Italy) E Mazza | 5 | 2
(Austria) S Lochbihler | 7 | 6
(Spain) A Tous | 2 | 1
(West Germany) T Meinecke | 6 | 6
(Czechoslovakia) T Šmíd | 6 | 5 | 1
6 | (Czechoslovakia) M Střelba | 2 | 7 | 6

Second round
1 | (Sweden) K Carlsson | 6 | 7
(Argentina) G Giussani | 4 | 6
(France) T Champion | 6 | 6
7 | (West Germany) R Osterthun | 3 | 3
(Czechoslovakia) J Čihák | 6 | 6
(Austria) S Lochbihler | 3 | 3
(West Germany) T Meinecke | 6 | 6 | 4
6 | (Czechoslovakia) M Střelba | 4 | 7 | 6

Quarterfinals
1 | (Sweden) K Carlsson | 6 | 2 | 6
(France) T Champion | 1 | 6 | 4
(Czechoslovakia) J Čihák | 6 | 7
6 | (Czechoslovakia) M Střelba | 4 | 6

Semifinals
1 | (Sweden) K Carlsson | 6 | 5 | 6
(Czechoslovakia) J Čihák | 2 | 7 | 4

=== Bottom half ===
First round
5 | (Soviet Union) A Võsand | 2 | 2
Q | (Romania) G Cosac | 6 | 6
(Spain) J Aguilera | 4 | 3
(Argentina) F Davín | 6 | 6
(Italy) M Cierro | 6 | 6
(West Germany) M Rackl | 4 | 2
(Spain) J Colas | 3 | 6 | 3
3 | (United States) L Duncan | 6 | 1 | 6
8 | (Italy) F Cancellotti | 7 | 7
(Argentina) C Miniussi | 5 | 6
LL | (West Germany) P Ballauff | 6 | 3 | 2
(Argentina) R Azar | 2 | 6 | 6
(Italy) C Panatta | 4 | 4
(Italy) O Camporese | 6 | 6
WC | (Greece) G Kalovelonis | 1 | 4
2 | (Haiti) R Agénor | 6 | 6

Second round
Q | (Romania) G Cosac | 2 | 0
(Argentina) F Davín | 6 | 6
(Italy) M Cierro | 5 | 1
3 | (United States) L Duncan | 7 | 6
8 | (Italy) F Cancellotti | 7 | 6
(Argentina) R Azar | 5 | 4
(Italy) O Camporese | 5 | 3
2 | (Haiti) R Agénor | 7 | 6

Quarterfinals
(Argentina) F Davín | 6 | 6
3 | (United States) L Duncan | 0 | 1
8 | (Italy) F Cancellotti | 3 | 0
2 | (Haiti) R Agénor | 6 | 6

Semifinals
(Argentina) F Davín | 6 | 3 | 5
2 | (Haiti) R Agénor | 4 | 6 | 7
