= 1985 Bologna Open =

- Date: 10–16 June
- Edition: 1st
- Category: Grand Prix
- Draw: 32S / 16D
- Prize money: $80,000
- Surface: Clay / outdoor
- Location: Bologna, Italy

Champions

Singles
- (France) Thierry Tulasne

Doubles
- (Italy) Paolo Canè / (Italy) Simone Colombo
- Bologna Outdoor

The 1985 Bologna Open was a men's tennis tournament played on outdoor clay courts in Bologna, Italy that was part of the 1985 Nabisco Grand Prix circuit. It was the inaugural edition of the tournament and was played from 10 June until 16 June 1985. Third-seeded Thierry Tulasne won the singles title.

== Finals ==
=== Singles ===
(France) Thierry Tulasne defeated (Italy) Claudio Panatta 6–2, 6–0

- It was Tulasne's 1st singles title of the year and the 2nd of his career.

=== Doubles ===
(Italy) Paolo Canè / (Italy) Simone Colombo defeated (Spain) Jordi Arrese / (Spain) Alberto Tous 7–5, 6–4
