= 1987 Campionati Internazionali di Sicilia – Doubles =

Doubles
- 1987 Campionati Internazionali di Sicilia

Final
- Champions: (Mexico) Leonardo Lavalle (Italy) Claudio Panatta
- Runners-up: (Czechoslovakia) Petr Korda (Czechoslovakia) Tomáš Šmíd
- Score: 3–6, 6–4, 6–4

Events
Singles	Doubles
← 1986 ·	Campionati Internazionali di Sicilia	· 1988 →

Paolo Canè and Simone Colombo were the defending champions, but Canè did not compete this year. Colombo teamed up with Francesco Cancellotti and lost in the quarterfinals to Josef Čihák and Cyril Suk.

Leonardo Lavalle and Claudio Panatta won the title by defeating Petr Korda and Tomáš Šmíd 3–6, 6–4, 6–4 in the final.

== Seeds ==
1. (Czechoslovakia) Petr Korda / (Czechoslovakia) Tomáš Šmíd (final)
2. (Mexico) Leonardo Lavalle / (Italy) Claudio Panatta (champions)
3. (Czechoslovakia) Josef Čihák / (Czechoslovakia) Cyril Suk (semifinals)
4. (Spain) Jordi Arrese / (Spain) David de Miguel (first round)

== Draw ==
=== Key ===
- Q = Qualifier
- WC = Wild card
- LL = Lucky loser
- Alt = Alternate
- SE = Special exempt
- PR = Protected ranking
- ITF = ITF entry
- JE = Junior exempt
- w/o = Walkover
- r = Retired
- d = Defaulted
- SR = Special ranking

=== Draw ===
First round
1	(Czechoslovakia) P Korda (Czechoslovakia) T Šmíd	6	3	6
(Spain) JC Báguena (Italy) A Baldoni	2	6	1
(West Germany) H Schwaier (West Germany) C Weis	7	6	5
(Argentina) M Jaite (Czechoslovakia) L Pimek	6	7	7
3	(Czechoslovakia) J Čihák (Czechoslovakia) C Suk	6	6	7
(Italy) O Camporese (Italy) E Rossi	7	1	6
(Italy) F Cancellotti (Italy) S Colombo	7	5	7
(West Germany) D Keretić (West Germany) W Popp	6	7	5
(Argentina) R Argüello (Brazil) S Ribeiro	6	4	3
(Italy) M Cierro (Italy) M Fioroni	2	6	6
WC	(Socialist Federal Republic of Yugoslavia) G Ivanišević (Italy) D Nargiso	6	6
4	(Spain) J Arrese (Spain) D de Miguel	2	4
(United States) J Brown (United States) L Duncan	7	2	6
(Sweden) T Svantesson (United States) J Treml	6	6	4
(Peru) P Arraya (Sweden) J Windahl	3	4
2	(Mexico) L Lavalle (Italy) C Panatta	6	6

Quarterfinals
1	(Czechoslovakia) P Korda (Czechoslovakia) T Šmíd	6	3	6
(Argentina) M Jaite (Czechoslovakia) L Pimek	4	6	3
3	(Czechoslovakia) J Čihák (Czechoslovakia) C Suk	7	7
(Italy) F Cancellotti (Italy) S Colombo	6	6
(Italy) M Cierro (Italy) M Fioroni	6	6
WC	(Socialist Federal Republic of Yugoslavia) G Ivanišević (Italy) D Nargiso	4	3
(United States) J Brown (United States) L Duncan	2	3
2	(Mexico) L Lavalle (Italy) C Panatta	6	6

Semifinals
1	(Czechoslovakia) P Korda (Czechoslovakia) T Šmíd	3	7	6
3	(Czechoslovakia) J Čihák (Czechoslovakia) C Suk	6	5	1
(Italy) M Cierro (Italy) M Fioroni	3	3
2	(Mexico) L Lavalle (Italy) C Panatta	6	6

Final
1	(Czechoslovakia) P Korda (Czechoslovakia) T Šmíd	6	4	4
2	(Mexico) L Lavalle (Italy) C Panatta	3	6	6
