= 1985 Bologna Open – Doubles =

Doubles
- 1985 Bologna Open

Final
- Champions: (Italy) Paolo Canè (Italy) Simone Colombo
- Runners-up: (Spain) Jordi Arrese (Spain) Alberto Tous
- Score: 7–5, 6–4

Details
- Draw: 16
- Seeds: 4

Events
Singles	Doubles
Bologna Outdoor	· 1986 →

In the first edition of the tournament, Paolo Canè and Simone Colombo won the title by defeating Jordi Arrese and Alberto Tous 7–5, 6–4 in the final.

== Seeds ==
1. (Brazil) Givaldo Barbosa / (Brazil) Ivan Kley (semifinals)
2. (Australia) John Alexander / (Italy) Claudio Panatta (quarterfinals)
3. (Brazil) Alexandre Hocevar / (Brazil) Marcos Hocevar (quarterfinals)
4. (Italy) Paolo Canè / (Italy) Simone Colombo (champion)

== Draw ==
=== Key ===
- Q = Qualifier
- WC = Wild card
- LL = Lucky loser
- Alt = Alternate
- SE = Special exempt
- PR = Protected ranking
- ITF = ITF entry
- JE = Junior exempt
- w/o = Walkover
- r = Retired
- d = Defaulted
- SR = Special ranking

=== Draw ===
First round
1	(Brazil) G Barbosa (Brazil) I Kley	3	6	6
(Italy) L Bottazzi (Italy) M Cierro	6	3	4
(Argentina) F Yunis (Argentina) JC Yunis	6	4	0
(West Germany) P Elter (Australia) C Limberger	4	6	6
4	(Italy) P Canè (Italy) S Colombo	w/o
(Uruguay) D Pérez (Ecuador) R Viver
(Haiti) R Agénor (South Africa) C Campbell	5	2
(Argentina) C Miniussi (Argentina) G Tiberti	7	6
(Brazil) D Campos (Italy) A de Minicis	6	2
(Spain) J Arrese (Spain) A Tous	7	6
(West Germany) D Keretić (Hungary) Z Kuhárszky	1	3
3	(Brazil) A Hocevar (Brazil) M Hocevar	6	6
(France) P Portes (France) T Tulasne	6	6
(Italy) F Rocchi (Argentina) T Stålhandske	4	4
(Italy) Luca Gasparini (Switzerland) C Mezzadri	6	4	4
2	(Australia) J Alexander (Italy) C Panatta	3	6	6

Quarterfinals
1	(Brazil) G Barbosa (Brazil) I Kley	6	6
(West Germany) P Elter (Australia) C Limberger	3	4
4	(Italy) P Canè (Italy) S Colombo	4^{r}
(Argentina) C Miniussi (Argentina) G Tiberti	1
(Spain) J Arrese (Spain) A Tous	6	7
3	(Brazil) A Hocevar (Brazil) M Hocevar	3	6
(France) P Portes (France) T Tulasne	6	6
2	(Australia) J Alexander (Italy) C Panatta	4	4

Semifinals
1	(Brazil) G Barbosa (Brazil) I Kley	4	2
4	(Italy) P Canè (Italy) S Colombo	6	6
(Spain) J Arrese (Spain) A Tous	2	6	6
(France) P Portes (France) T Tulasne	6	4	2

Final
4	(Italy) P Canè (Italy) S Colombo	7	6
(Spain) J Arrese (Spain) A Tous	5	4
