= 1988 Campionati Internazionali di Sicilia – Doubles =

Doubles
- 1988 Campionati Internazionali di Sicilia

Final
- Champions: (Peru) Carlos di Laura (Uruguay) Marcelo Filippini
- Runners-up: (Argentina) Alberto Mancini (Argentina) Christian Miniussi
- Score: 6–2, 6–0

Details
- Draw: 24
- Seeds: 8

Events
Singles	Doubles
← 1987 ·	Campionati Internazionali di Sicilia	· 1989 →

Leonardo Lavalle and Claudio Panatta were the defending champions, but Lavalle opted to rest after competing at the Summer Olympics at Seoul during the previous week. Panatta teamed up with Thomas Muster and lost in the semifinals to Carlos di Laura and Marcelo Filippini.

Di Laura and Filippini won the title by defeating Alberto Mancini and Christian Miniussi 6–2, 6–0 in the final.

== Seeds ==
All seeds received a bye to the second round.

1. (Czechoslovakia) Josef Čihák / (Czechoslovakia) Karel Nováček (quarterfinals)
2. (Czechoslovakia) Tomáš Šmíd / (Sweden) Mats Wilander (second round)
3. (Argentina) Alberto Mancini / (Argentina) Christian Miniussi (final)
4. (Austria) Thomas Muster / (Italy) Claudio Panatta (semifinals)
5. (Peru) Pablo Arraya / (Argentina) Horacio de la Peña (second round)
6. (West Germany) Hans Schwaier / (Czechoslovakia) Branislav Stankovič (second round)
7. (Sweden) Christer Allgårdh / (West Germany) Damir Keretić (second round)
8. (Peru) Carlos di Laura / (Uruguay) Marcelo Filippini (champions)

== Draw ==
=== Key ===
- Q = Qualifier
- WC = Wild card
- LL = Lucky loser
- Alt = Alternate
- ITF = ITF entry
- PR = Protected ranking
- SR = Special ranking
- SE = Special exempt
- JE = Junior exempt
- JR = Junior Accelerator Programme entrant
- CO = College Accelerator Programme entrant
- NG = Next Gen Accelerator Program entrant
- w/o = Walkover
- r = Retired
- d = Defaulted

=== Finals ===
Semifinals
8	(Peru) Carlos di Laura (Uruguay) Marcelo Filippini	7	6
4	(Austria) Thomas Muster (Italy) Claudio Panatta	5	4
3	(Argentina) Alberto Mancini (Argentina) Christian Miniussi	3
(Argentina) Gustavo Luza (Argentina) Guillermo Pérez Roldán	0	r

Final
8	(Peru) Carlos di Laura (Uruguay) Marcelo Filippini	6	6
3	(Argentina) Alberto Mancini (Argentina) Christian Miniussi	2	0

=== Top half ===
First round
(Spain) J Aguilera (Spain) F Luna	6	6
(Italy) Silvio Moine (Italy) S Soresini	0	3
(United States) J Brown (United States) L Duncan	4	3
(Italy) M Fioroni (Ecuador) R Viver	6	6
(Sweden) T Haldin (West Germany) M Zillner	2	5
(Argentina) F Davín (Italy) C Pistolesi	6	7
(Italy) Maurizio Trapani (Italy) Marco Valentino	3	2
(Spain) J Arrese (Italy) F Cancellotti	6	6

Second round
1	(Czechoslovakia) J Čihák (Czechoslovakia) K Nováček	4	6	6
(Spain) J Aguilera (Spain) F Luna	6	2	3
(Italy) M Fioroni (Ecuador) R Viver	4	6	6
8	(Peru) C di Laura (Uruguay) M Filippini	6	3	7
4	(Austria) T Muster (Italy) C Panatta	6	7
(Argentina) F Davín (Italy) C Pistolesi	1	5
(Spain) J Arrese (Italy) F Cancellotti	3	6	6
6	(West Germany) H Schwaier (Czechoslovakia) B Stankovič	6	3	2

Quarterfinals
1	(Czechoslovakia) J Čihák (Czechoslovakia) K Nováček	3	6
8	(Peru) C di Laura (Uruguay) M Filippini	6	7
4	(Austria) T Muster (Italy) C Panatta	3	6	7
(Spain) J Arrese (Italy) F Cancellotti	6	2	5

Semifinals
8	(Peru) C di Laura (Uruguay) M Filippini	7	6
4	(Austria) T Muster (Italy) C Panatta	5	4

=== Bottom half ===
First round
(Argentina) R Argüello (Argentina) G Mirad	5	6	6
(Spain) J Avendaño (Chile) R Gajardo	7	3	2
(Italy) M Cierro (Argentina) G Giussani	6	6
(Argentina) Pablo Francisco (Argentina) Guillermo Minutella	3	1
(Spain) J Clavet (Brazil) M Hennemann	6	6
(France) T Champion (France) T Tulasne	3	3
(United States) E Adams (West Germany) F Dennhardt	6	3
(Argentina) G Luza (Argentina) G Pérez Roldán	7	6

Second round
5	(Peru) P Arraya (Argentina) H de la Peña	3	1
(Argentina) R Argüello (Argentina) G Mirad	6	6
(Italy) M Cierro (Argentina) G Giussani	6	2
3	(Argentina) C Miniussi (Argentina) A Mancini	7	6
7	(Sweden) C Allgårdh (West Germany) D Keretić	3	5
(Spain) J Clavet (Brazil) M Hennemann	6	7
(Argentina) G Luza (Argentina) G Pérez Roldán	5	7	6
2	(Czechoslovakia) T Šmíd (Sweden) M Wilander	7	5	4

Quarterfinals
(Argentina) R Argüello (Argentina) G Mirad	2	6	2
3	(Argentina) C Miniussi (Argentina) A Mancini	6	2	6
(Spain) J Clavet (Brazil) M Hennemann	2	6	6
(Argentina) G Luza (Argentina) G Pérez Roldán	6	1	7

Semifinals
3	(Argentina) C Miniussi (Argentina) A Mancini	3
(Argentina) G Luza (Argentina) G Pérez Roldán	0	r
