= 1989 Campionati Internazionali della Valle D'Aosta – Singles =

Singles
- 1989 Campionati Internazionali della Valle D'Aosta

Final
- Champion: (Argentina) Franco Davín
- Runner-up: (Spain) Juan Aguilera
- Score: 6–2, 6–2

Details
- Draw: 32 (3WC/4Q/1LL)
- Seeds: 8

Events
| Singles | Doubles |
- ATP Saint-Vincent

Kent Carlsson was the defending champion, but did not compete this year. He played his last professional tournament in July at Kitzbühel before retiring from professional tennis in May 1990.

Franco Davín won the title by defeating Juan Aguilera 6–2, 6–2 in the final.

== Seeds ==
1. (Spain) Jordi Arrese (first round)
2. (n/a)
3. (Uruguay) Marcelo Filippini (quarterfinals)
4. (Argentina) Eduardo Bengoechea (second round)
5. (Spain) Tomás Carbonell (semifinals)
6. (United States) Lawson Duncan (first round)
7. (Italy) Francesco Cancellotti (second round)
8. (Argentina) Franco Davín (champion)

== Draw ==
Key

- Q = Qualifier
- WC = Wild card
- LL = Lucky loser
- Alt = Alternate
- ITF = ITF entry
- PR = Protected ranking
- SR = Special ranking
- SE = Special exempt
- JE = Junior exempt
- JR = Junior Accelerator Programme entrant
- CO = College Accelerator Programme entrant
- NG = Next Gen Accelerator Program entrant
- w/o = Walkover
- r = Retired
- d = Defaulted

=== Finals ===
Semifinals
(Italy) Claudio Pistolesi | 1 | 1
(Spain) Juan Aguilera | 6 | 6
5 | (Spain) Tomás Carbonell | 6 | 2
8 | (Argentina) Franco Davín | 7 | 6

Final
(Spain) Juan Aguilera | 2 | 2
8 | (Argentina) Franco Davín | 6 | 6

=== Top half ===
First round
1/WC | (Spain) J Arrese | 6 | 1
(Argentina) R Argüello | 7 | 6
Q | (France) A Boetsch | 3 | 4
(Socialist Federal Republic of Yugoslavia) M Ostoja | 6 | 6
(Czechoslovakia) J Čihák | 3 | 6 | 4
(Italy) C Pistolesi | 6 | 3 | 6
(Ecuador) R Viver | 6 | 4 | 3
7 | (Italy) F Cancellotti | 4 | 6 | 6
4 | (Argentina) E Bengoechea | 6 | 5 | 6
(Peru) A Aramburú | 2 | 7 | 3
(Spain) J Aguilera | 6 | 6
(Argentina) R Azar | 1 | 0
(Argentina) G Rivas | 6 | 7
(Czechoslovakia) C Suk | 3 | 6
(Argentina) G Giussani | 6 | 6
6 | (United States) L Duncan | 3 | 0

Second round
(Argentina) R Argüello | 2 | 1
(Socialist Federal Republic of Yugoslavia) M Ostoja | 6 | 2^{r}
(Italy) C Pistolesi | 6 | 6
7 | (Italy) F Cancellotti | 4 | 1
4 | (Argentina) E Bengoechea | 1 | 4
(Spain) J Aguilera | 6 | 6
(Argentina) G Rivas | 1 | 1
(Argentina) G Giussani | 6 | 6

Quarterfinals
(Argentina) R Argüello | 3 | 5
(Italy) C Pistolesi | 6 | 7
(Spain) J Aguilera | 6 | 6
(Argentina) G Giussani | 3 | 1

Semifinals
(Italy) C Pistolesi | 1 | 1
(Spain) J Aguilera | 6 | 6

=== Bottom half ===
First round
5 | (Spain) T Carbonell | 5 | 6 | 6
Q | (Spain) C Costa | 7 | 3 | 2
WC | (Argentina) JL Clerc | 3 | 1
(Sweden) C Allgårdh | 6 | 6
(Czechoslovakia) J Bulant | 6 | 6
(Switzerland) C Mezzadri | 3 | 4
(Italy) S Colombo | 3 | 0
3 | (Uruguay) M Filippini | 6 | 6
8 | (Argentina) F Davín | 6 | 6
Q | (Argentina) F Yunis | 0 | 0
WC | (Italy) M Narducci | 6 | 4 | 6
(Uruguay) D Pérez | 3 | 6 | 2
LL | (Spain) JL Aparisi | 2 | 4
(Sweden) N Kulti | 6 | 6
(Soviet Union) A Võsand | 7 | 6
Q | (Italy) R Furlan | 6 | 2

Second round
5 | (Spain) T Carbonell | 6 | 6
(Sweden) C Allgårdh | 2 | 1
(Czechoslovakia) J Bulant | 3 | 6 | 3
3 | (Uruguay) M Filippini | 6 | 3 | 6
8 | (Argentina) F Davín | 6 | 6
WC | (Italy) M Narducci | 3 | 3
(Sweden) N Kulti | 4 | 6 | 5
(Soviet Union) A Võsand | 6 | 0 | 7

Quarterfinals
5 | (Spain) T Carbonell | 6 | 6
3 | (Uruguay) M Filippini | 3 | 2
8 | (Argentina) F Davín | 6 | 6
(Soviet Union) A Võsand | 2 | 1

Semifinals
5 | (Spain) T Carbonell | 6 | 2
8 | (Argentina) F Davín | 7 | 6
