= 1989 Campionati Internazionali della Valle D'Aosta – Doubles =

Doubles
- 1989 Campionati Internazionali della Valle D'Aosta

Final
- Champions: (Czechoslovakia) Josef Čihák (Czechoslovakia) Cyril Suk
- Runners-up: (Italy) Massimo Cierro (Italy) Alessandro de Minicis
- Score: 6–4, 6–2

Details
- Draw: 16 (1WC)
- Seeds: 4

Events
| Singles | Doubles |
- ATP Saint-Vincent

Alberto Mancini and Christian Miniussi were the defending champions, but none competed this year.

Josef Čihák and Cyril Suk won the title by defeating Massimo Cierro and Alessandro de Minicis 6–4, 6–2 in the final.

== Seeds ==
1. (Czechoslovakia) Josef Čihák / (Czechoslovakia) Cyril Suk (champions)
2. (Spain) Tomás Carbonell / (Uruguay) Diego Pérez (first round)
3. (Italy) Simone Colombo / (Switzerland) Claudio Mezzadri (semifinals)
4. (Argentina) Eduardo Bengoechea / (Argentina) Gustavo Luza (quarterfinals)

== Draw ==
Key

- Q = Qualifier
- WC = Wild card
- LL = Lucky loser
- Alt = Alternate
- ITF = ITF entry
- PR = Protected ranking
- SR = Special ranking
- SE = Special exempt
- JE = Junior exempt
- JR = Junior Accelerator Programme entrant
- CO = College Accelerator Programme entrant
- NG = Next Gen Accelerator Program entrant
- w/o = Walkover
- r = Retired
- d = Defaulted

=== Draw ===
First round
1 | (Czechoslovakia) J Čihák (Czechoslovakia) C Suk | 6 | 4 | 7
(Spain) J Arrese (Italy) F Cancellotti | 3 | 6 | 5
(Italy) C Caratti (Italy) F Mordegan | 6 | 7 | 6
(Argentina) R Argüello (Italy) U Pigato | 7 | 5 | 4
3 | (Italy) S Colombo (Switzerland) C Mezzadri | 6 | 6
(Sweden) C Allgårdh (Sweden) D Engel | 1 | 3
(Argentina) P Albano (Spain) JF Altur | 6 | 6 | 6
WC | (Italy) P Pennisi (Italy) Simone Restelli | 7 | 4 | 1
(Italy) U Colombini (Sweden) F Nilsson | 6 | 6
(Ecuador) H Núñez (Ecuador) R Viver | 4 | 3
(Argentina) G Giussani (Argentina) G Rivas | 6 | 2
4 | (Argentina) E Bengoechea (Argentina) G Luza | 7 | 6
(Italy) M Cierro (Italy) A de Minicis | 6 | 6
(Spain) J Aguilera (Spain) C Costa | 2 | 4
(Italy) C Aprili (France) A Boetsch | 6 | 6
2 | (Spain) T Carbonell (Uruguay) D Pérez | 3 | 2

Quarterfinals
1 | (Czechoslovakia) J Čihák (Czechoslovakia) C Suk | 6 | 6
(Italy) C Caratti (Italy) F Mordegan | 2 | 4
3 | (Italy) S Colombo (Switzerland) C Mezzadri | 6 | 6
(Argentina) P Albano (Spain) JF Altur | 1 | 1
(Italy) U Colombini (Sweden) F Nilsson | 7 | 6
4 | (Argentina) E Bengoechea (Argentina) G Luza | 5 | 6^{r}
(Italy) M Cierro (Italy) A de Minicis | 6 | 7
(Italy) C Aprili (France) A Boetsch | 0 | 5

Semifinals
1 | (Czechoslovakia) J Čihák (Czechoslovakia) C Suk | 6 | 6
3 | (Italy) S Colombo (Switzerland) C Mezzadri | 4 | 4
(Italy) U Colombini (Sweden) F Nilsson | 4 | 5
(Italy) M Cierro (Italy) A de Minicis | 6 | 7

Final
1 | (Czechoslovakia) J Čihák (Czechoslovakia) C Suk | 6 | 6
(Italy) M Cierro (Italy) A de Minicis | 4 | 2
