= 1989 Monte Carlo Open – Singles =

Singles
- 1989 Monte Carlo Open

Final
- Champion: (Argentina) Alberto Mancini
- Runner-up: (West Germany) Boris Becker
- Score: 7–5, 2–6, 7–6, 7–5

Details
- Draw: 48 (6Q / 4WC)
- Seeds: 16

Events
Singles	Doubles
← 1988 ·	Monte Carlo Open	· 1990 →

Alberto Mancini won in the final 7–5, 2–6, 7–6, 7–5 against Boris Becker.

Ivan Lendl was the defending champion but did not compete this year.

== Seeds ==
A champion seed is indicated in bold text while text in italics indicates the round in which that seed was eliminated. All sixteen seeds received a bye to the second round.

1. (Sweden) Mats Wilander (semifinals)
2. (West Germany) Boris Becker (final)
3. (Sweden) ~~Kent Carlsson~~ (withdrew)
4. (Switzerland) Jakob Hlasek (second round)
5. (United States) Jimmy Connors (second round)
6. (France) Henri Leconte (second round, retired)
7. (Spain) Emilio Sánchez (second round)
8. (Argentina) Guillermo Pérez Roldán (quarterfinals)
9. (Sweden) Jonas Svensson (third round)
10. (Haiti) Ronald Agénor (quarterfinals)
11. (Socialist Federal Republic of Yugoslavia) Slobodan Živojinović (second round)
12. (Soviet Union) Andrei Chesnokov (second round)
13. (Austria) Horst Skoff (semifinals)
14. (Argentina) **Alberto Mancini (champion)**
15. (Australia) Mark Woodforde (second round)
16. (Spain) Jordi Arrese (third round)

== Draw ==
=== Key ===
- Q = Qualifier
- WC = Wild card
- LL = Lucky loser
- Alt = Alternate
- SE = Special exempt
- PR = Protected ranking
- ITF = ITF entry
- JE = Junior exempt
- w/o = Walkover
- r = Retired
- d = Defaulted
- SR = Special ranking

=== Finals ===
Semifinals
1	(Sweden) Mats Wilander	0	3
14	(Argentina) **Alberto Mancini**	**6**	**6**
13	(Austria) Horst Skoff	3	3
2	(West Germany) **Boris Becker**	**6**	**6**

Final
14	(Argentina) **Alberto Mancini**	**7**	2	**7**	**7**
2	(West Germany) Boris Becker	5	**6**	6	5

=== Top half ===
==== Section 1 ====
First round
WC	(Italy) **D Nargiso**	**6**	**7**
(Spain) F Luna	4	6
(West Germany) E Jelen	3	2
(Uruguay) **M Filippini**	**6**	**6**
Q	(Peru) P Arraya	2	**6**	6
Q	(West Germany) **R Osterthun**	**6**	2	**7**
(Mexico) L Lavalle	0	1
(France) **G Forget**	**6**	**6**

Second round
1	(Sweden) **M Wilander**	**7**	**6**
WC	(Italy) D Nargiso	6	1
(Uruguay) **M Filippini**	**7**	**6**
15	(Australia) M Woodforde	5	1
10	(Haiti) **R Agénor**	**6**	2	**6**
Q	(West Germany) R Osterthun	2	**6**	2
(France) **G Forget**	6	**6**	**6**
7	(Spain) E Sánchez	**7**	4	1

Third round
1	(Sweden) **M Wilander**	**6**	**6**
(Uruguay) M Filippini	4	4
9	(Haiti) **R Agénor**	**6**	**7**
(France) G Forget	2	5

Quarterfinals
1	(Sweden) **M Wilander**	**6**	**7**
9	(Haiti) R Agénor	3	6

==== Section 2 ====
First round
SE	(Socialist Federal Republic of Yugoslavia) G Ivanišević	5	4
Q	(Australia) **C Limberger**	**7**	**6**
Q	(France) F Santoro	4	1
SE	(Italy) **F Cancellotti**	**6**	**6**
(Czechoslovakia) K Nováček	2	1
WC	(West Germany) **C-U Steeb**	**6**	**6**
(Italy) **P Canè**	2	**7**	**6**
(Spain) J Sánchez	**6**	6	0

Second round
LL	(Sweden) J Nyström	1	1
Q	(Australia) **C Limberger**	**6**	**6**
SE	(Italy) F Cancellotti	4	4
14	(Argentina) **A Mancini**	**6**	**6**
12	(Soviet Union) A Chesnokov	4	4
WC	(West Germany) **C-U Steeb**	**6**	**6**
(Italy) **P Canè**	**7**	**6**
5	(United States) J Connors	6	1

Third round
Q	(Australia) C Limberger	1	3
14	(Argentina) **A Mancini**	**6**	**6**
WC	(West Germany) **C-U Steeb**	**6**	**6**
(Italy) P Canè	4	1

Quarterfinals
14	(Argentina) **A Mancini**	**6**	**6**
WC	(West Germany) C-U Steeb	3	3

=== Bottom half ===
==== Section 3 ====
First round
(Argentina) H de la Peña	**6**	4	6
(West Germany) **P Kühnen**	3	**6**	**7**
(Sweden) **J Gunnarsson**	**7**	**6**
(Sweden) C Bergström	5	1
(France) O Delaître	4	0
Q	(Czechoslovakia) **M Střelba**	**6**	**6**
(Argentina) **M Jaite**	6	**6**	**7**
(United States) J Arias	**7**	3	5

Second round
6	(France) H Leconte	3	2^{r}
(West Germany) **P Kühnen**	**6**	3
(Sweden) **J Gunnarsson**	**6**	**6**
11	(Socialist Federal Republic of Yugoslavia) S Živojinović	4	2
13	(Austria) **H Skoff**	4	**6**	**6**
Q	(Czechoslovakia) M Střelba	**6**	4	1
(Argentina) **M Jaite**	**6**	**6**
4	(Switzerland) J Hlasek	4	1

Third round
(West Germany) P Kühnen	5	2
(Sweden) **J Gunnarsson**	**7**	**6**
13	(Austria) **H Skoff**	**7**	**7**
(Argentina) M Jaite	5	6

Quarterfinals
(Sweden) J Gunnarsson	4	4
13	(Austria) **H Skoff**	**6**	**6**

==== Section 4 ====
First round
WC	(France) T Champion	**6**	2	6
(Sweden) **M Gustafsson**	2	**6**	**7**
(Czechoslovakia) M Vajda	3	1
(France) **T Tulasne**	**6**	**6**
(Australia) **J Frawley**	**6**	**6**
Q	(Sweden) L Jönsson	0	3
WC	(Sweden) H Sundström	4	6
(United States) **L Duncan**	**6**	**7**

Second round
8	(Argentina) **G Pérez Roldán**	**6**	**6**
(Sweden) M Gustafsson	4	2
(France) T Tulasne	**7**	3	5
9	(Sweden) **J Svensson**	6	**6**	**7**
16	(Spain) **J Arrese**	**6**	**6**
(Australia) J Frawley	1	0
(United States) L Duncan	4	1
2	(West Germany) **B Becker**	**6**	**6**

Third round
8	(Argentina) **G Pérez Roldán**	**6**	**6**
9	(Sweden) J Svensson	4	4
16	(Spain) J Arrese	1	3
2	(West Germany) **B Becker**	**6**	**6**

Quarterfinals
8	(Argentina) G Pérez Roldán	3	3
2	(West Germany) **B Becker**	**6**	**6**
