= 1988 Bordeaux Open – Doubles =

Doubles
- 1988 Bordeaux Open

Final
- Champions: (Sweden) Joakim Nyström (Italy) Claudio Panatta
- Runners-up: (Argentina) Christian Miniussi (Italy) Diego Nargiso
- Score: 6–1, 6–4

Events
Singles	Doubles
← 1987 ·	ATP Bordeaux	· 1989 →

Sergio Casal and Emilio Sánchez were the defending champions but none competed this year.

Joakim Nyström and Claudio Panatta won the title by defeating Christian Miniussi and Diego Nargiso 6–1, 6–4 in the final.

== Seeds ==
1. (Argentina) Christian Miniussi / (Italy) Diego Nargiso (final)
2. (Sweden) Joakim Nyström / (Italy) Claudio Panatta (champions)
3. (West Germany) Patrick Baur / (Brazil) Luiz Mattar (semifinals)
4. (United States) Brett Dickinson / (France) Jérôme Potier (semifinals)

== Draw ==
=== Key ===
- Q = Qualifier
- WC = Wild card
- LL = Lucky loser
- Alt = Alternate
- SE = Special exempt
- PR = Protected ranking
- ITF = ITF entry
- JE = Junior exempt
- w/o = Walkover
- r = Retired
- d = Defaulted
- SR = Special ranking

=== Draw ===
First round
1	(Argentina) C Miniussi (Italy) D Nargiso	7	6
(Italy) U Colombini (France) L Courteau	6	3
(Spain) F Luna (Argentina) G Rivas	3	3
(United States) L Duncan (Spain) A Tous	6	6
3	(West Germany) P Baur (Brazil) L Mattar	7	6
(France) T Champion (France) É Winogradsky	6	4
(Austria) T Muster (Austria) H Skoff	6	6
(Morocco) K Outaleb (Spain) G Urpí	4	2
(Peru) P Arraya (Spain) JC Báguena	7	4	4
(Haiti) R Agénor (Morocco) Driss Ben Omar	6	6	6
(France) S Grenier (Chile) M Rodríguez	6	1	6
4	(United States) B Dickinson (France) J Potier	4	6	7
(Spain) J Arrese (Italy) F Cancellotti	6	6
(France) JP Fleurian (Italy) C Pistolesi	4	1
(Chile) S Cortés (Argentina) G Giussani	5	3
2	(Sweden) J Nyström (Italy) C Panatta	7	6

Quarterfinals
1	(Argentina) C Miniussi (Italy) D Nargiso	7	6
(United States) L Duncan (Spain) A Tous	6	3
3	(West Germany) P Baur (Brazil) L Mattar	7	3	6
(Austria) T Muster (Austria) H Skoff	5	6	3
(Haiti) R Agénor (Morocco) Driss Ben Omar	0	4
4	(United States) B Dickinson (France) J Potier	6	6
(Spain) J Arrese (Italy) F Cancellotti	7	1	4
2	(Sweden) J Nyström (Italy) C Panatta	5	6	6

Semifinals
1	(Argentina) C Miniussi (Italy) D Nargiso	6	6
3	(West Germany) P Baur (Brazil) L Mattar	4	4
4	(United States) B Dickinson (France) J Potier	4	5
2	(Sweden) J Nyström (Italy) C Panatta	6	7

Final
1	(Argentina) C Miniussi (Italy) D Nargiso	1	4
2	(Sweden) J Nyström (Italy) C Panatta	6	6
