= 1989 Monte Carlo Open – Doubles =

Doubles
- 1989 Monte Carlo Open

Final
- Champions: (Czechoslovakia) Tomáš Šmíd; (Australia) Mark Woodforde
- Runners-up: (Italy) Paolo Canè; (Italy) Diego Nargiso
- Score: 1–6, 6–4, 6–2

Details
- Draw: 24
- Seeds: 8

Events
Singles	Doubles
- Monte Carlo Open

Sergio Casal and Emilio Sánchez were the defending champions but lost in the second round to Marcelo Filippini and Horst Skoff.

Tomáš Šmíd and Mark Woodforde won in the final 1–6, 6–4, 6–2 against Paolo Canè and Diego Nargiso.

== Seeds ==
All eight seeded teams received byes to the second round.

1. (Spain) Sergio Casal / (Spain) Emilio Sánchez (second round)
2. (Czechoslovakia) Tomáš Šmíd / (Australia) Mark Woodforde (champions)
3. (West Germany) Boris Becker / (West Germany) Eric Jelen (quarterfinals)
4. (Australia) Peter Doohan / (Australia) Laurie Warder (second round)
5. (Socialist Federal Republic of Yugoslavia) Goran Ivanišević / (Socialist Federal Republic of Yugoslavia) Slobodan Živojinović (quarterfinals)
6. (Switzerland) Jakob Hlasek / (Switzerland) Claudio Mezzadri (second round)
7. (Netherlands) Tom Nijssen / (West Germany) Ricki Osterthun (second round)
8. (Switzerland) Heinz Günthardt / (Hungary) Balázs Taróczy (second round)

== Draw ==
Key

- Q = Qualifier
- WC = Wild card
- LL = Lucky loser
- Alt = Alternate
- ITF = ITF entry
- PR = Protected ranking
- SR = Special ranking
- SE = Special exempt
- JE = Junior exempt
- JR = Junior Accelerator Programme entrant
- CO = College Accelerator Programme entrant
- NG = Next Gen Accelerator Program entrant
- w/o = Walkover
- r = Retired
- d = Defaulted

=== Finals ===
Semifinals

Final

- (Mexico) Leonardo Lavalle
- (Spain) Javier Sánchez
6
6

- (Italy) Paolo Canè
- (Italy) Diego Nargiso
7
7

- (Italy) Paolo Canè
- (Italy) Diego Nargiso
6
4
2

2
- (Czechoslovakia) Tomáš Šmíd
- (Australia) Mark Woodforde
1
6
6

- (West Germany) Patrik Kühnen
- (West Germany) Carl-Uwe Steeb
2
6

2
- (Czechoslovakia) Tomáš Šmíd
- (Australia) Mark Woodforde
6
7

=== Top half ===
First round

Second round

Quarterfinals

Semifinals

1
- (Spain) S Casal
- (Spain) E Sánchez
3
6
5

- (Uruguay) M Filippini
- (Austria) H Skoff
7
7

- (Uruguay) M Filippini
- (Austria) H Skoff
6
2
7

- (Argentina) H de la Peña
- (Argentina) A Mancini
5
6

- (Uruguay) M Filippini
- (Austria) H Skoff
3
3

- (Iran) M Bahrami
- (France) T Champion
6
4
3

- (Mexico) L Lavalle
- (Spain) J Sánchez
6
6

- (Mexico) L Lavalle
- (Spain) J Sánchez
3
6
6

- (Mexico) L Lavalle
- (Spain) J Sánchez
6
6

7
- (Netherlands) T Nijssen
- (West Germany) R Osterthun
0
3

- (Mexico) L Lavalle
- (Spain) J Sánchez
6
6

- (Italy) P Canè
- (Italy) D Nargiso
7
7

3
- (West Germany) B Becker
- (West Germany) E Jelen
7
6

WC
- (Haiti) R Agénor
- (France) T Benhabiles
2
6

- (Sweden) R Båthman
- (Sweden) L-A Wahlgren
6
3

- (Sweden) R Båthman
- (Sweden) L-A Wahlgren
6
7

3
- (West Germany) B Becker
- (West Germany) E Jelen
3
4

- (Italy) P Canè
- (Italy) D Nargiso
6
7
6

- (Italy) P Canè
- (Italy) D Nargiso
6
6

- (United States) J Arias
- (Peru) P Arraya
7
6
3

- (Italy) P Canè
- (Italy) D Nargiso
6
6

6
- (Switzerland) J Hlasek
- (Switzerland) C Mezzadri
4
4

=== Bottom half ===
First round

Second round

Quarterfinals

Semifinals

5
(Socialist Federal Republic of Yugoslavia) G Ivanišević
(Socialist Federal Republic of Yugoslavia) S Živojinović
6
5
7

(France) O Delaître
(France) É Winogradsky
6
5
2

- (Argentina) G Luza
- (Argentina) G Pérez Roldán
3
7
6

- (Argentina) G Luza
- (Argentina) G Pérez Roldán
4
7
6

5
(Socialist Federal Republic of Yugoslavia) G Ivanišević
(Socialist Federal Republic of Yugoslavia) S Živojinović
4
6
3

- (West Germany) P Kühnen
- (West Germany) C-U Steeb
6
6

- (West Germany) P Kühnen
- (West Germany) C-U Steeb
6
3
6

- (Sweden) J Gunnarsson
- (Denmark) M Mortensen
4
3

- (West Germany) P Kühnen
- (West Germany) C-U Steeb
7
6

4
- (Australia) P Doohan
- (Australia) L Warder
5
2

- (West Germany) P Kühnen
- (West Germany) C-U Steeb
2
6

2
- (Czechoslovakia) T Šmíd
- (Australia) M Woodforde
6
7

8
- (Switzerland) H Günthardt
- (Hungary) B Taróczy
5
1

- (Sweden) N Kroon
- (Czechoslovakia) K Nováček
4
7
3

- (Italy) O Camporese
- (Italy) M Narducci
7
6

- (Italy) O Camporese
- (Italy) M Narducci
6
6
6

- (Italy) O Camporese
- (Italy) M Narducci
3
5

WC
- (Italy) F Cancellotti
- (Italy) C Pistolesi
6
6
6

2
- (Czechoslovakia) T Šmíd
- (Australia) M Woodforde
6
7

- (Australia) C Limberger
- (Italy) C Panatta
7
4
3

WC
- (Italy) F Cancellotti
- (Italy) C Pistolesi
2
3

2
- (Czechoslovakia) T Šmíd
- (Australia) M Woodforde
6
6
