= 1988 Campionati Internazionali di Sicilia =

- Date: 26 September – 2 October
- Edition: 10th
- Category: Grand Prix
- Draw: 48S / 24D
- Prize money: $93,400
- Surface: Clay / outdoor
- Location: Palermo, Italy

Champions

Singles
- (Sweden) Mats Wilander

Doubles
- (Peru) Carlos di Laura / (Uruguay) Marcelo Filippini
| ← 1987 · | Campionati Internazionali di Sicilia | · 1989 → |

The 1988 Campionati Internazionali di Sicilia was a men's tennis tournament played on outdoor clay courts in Palermo, Italy that was part of the 1988 Nabisco Grand Prix. It was the tenth edition of the tournament and took place from 26 September until 2 October 1988. First-seeded Mats Wilander won the singles title.

== Finals ==
=== Singles ===
(Sweden) Mats Wilander defeated (Sweden) Kent Carlsson 6–1, 3–6, 6–4

- It was Wilander's 6th singles title of the year and the 32nd of his career.

=== Doubles ===
(Peru) Carlos di Laura / (Uruguay) Marcelo Filippini defeated (Argentina) Alberto Mancini / (Argentina) Christian Miniussi 6–2, 6–0
