= 1988 Bordeaux Open – Singles =

Singles
- 1988 Bordeaux Open

Final
- Champion: (Austria) Thomas Muster
- Runner-up: (Haiti) Ronald Agénor
- Score: 6–3, 6–3

Details
- Draw: 32 (2WC/4Q/1LL)
- Seeds: 8

Events
Singles	Doubles
← 1987 ·	ATP Bordeaux	· 1989 →

Emilio Sánchez was the defending champion but chose to compete at Hilversum in the same week, winning that tournament.

Thomas Muster won the title by defeating Ronald Agénor 6–3, 6–3 in the final.

== Seeds ==
1. (France) Yannick Noah (semifinals)
2. (Sweden) Kent Carlsson (quarterfinals, withdrew)
3. (Austria) Thomas Muster (champion)
4. (Sweden) Joakim Nyström (quarterfinals)
5. (Haiti) Ronald Agénor (final)
6. (Brazil) Luiz Mattar (quarterfinals)
7. (Spain) Jordi Arrese (first round)
8. (United States) Lawson Duncan (quarterfinals)

== Draw ==
=== Key ===
- Q = Qualifier
- WC = Wild card
- LL = Lucky loser
- Alt = Alternate
- SE = Special exempt
- PR = Protected ranking
- ITF = ITF entry
- JE = Junior exempt
- w/o = Walkover
- r = Retired
- d = Defaulted
- SR = Special ranking

=== Finals ===
Semifinals
1	(France) Yannick Noah	6	2	3
5	(Haiti) Ronald Agénor	4	6	6
3	(Austria) Thomas Muster	4	6	7
(Austria) Horst Skoff	6	4	5

Final
5	(Haiti) Ronald Agénor	3	3
3	(Austria) Thomas Muster	6	6

=== Top half ===
First round
1	(France) Y Noah	6	7	6
LL	(Argentina) G Rivas	7	5	3
(Argentina) F Davín	6	6
(Italy) F Cancellotti	0	3
(Sweden) P Lindgren	0	1
(Spain) A Tous	6	6
(Argentina) G Vilas	7	2	3
8	(United States) L Duncan	6	6	6
4	(Sweden) J Nyström	6	4	6
Q	(France) É Winogradsky	0	6	1
(Argentina) C Miniussi	3	6
Q	(France) T Pham	6	7
Q	(Argentina) G Giussani	0	3
(France) J Potier	6	6
(France) T Tulasne	6	2	2
5	(Haiti) R Agénor	4	6	6

Second round
1	(France) Y Noah	6	1	7
(Argentina) F Davín	2	6	6
(Spain) A Tous	2	0
8	(United States) L Duncan	6	6
4	(Sweden) J Nyström	6	6
Q	(France) T Pham	4	4
(France) J Potier	2	3
5	(Haiti) R Agénor	6	6

Quarterfinals
1	(France) Y Noah	6	7	6
8	(United States) L Duncan	7	6	4
4	(Sweden) J Nyström	4	4
5	(Haiti) R Agénor	6	6

Semifinals
1	(France) Y Noah	6	2	3
5	(Haiti) R Agénor	4	6	6

=== Bottom half ===
First round
6	(Brazil) L Mattar	6	6
WC	(France) L Courteau	2	2
(Spain) F Luna	4	6	6
WC	(France) S Grenier	6	3	3
(Italy) C Pistolesi	6	6	7
(France) JP Fleurian	3	7	5
(France) T Champion	1	4
3	(Austria) T Muster	6	6
7	(Spain) J Arrese	3	6	5
(Peru) P Arraya	6	2	7
(Austria) H Skoff	4	6	6
(Uruguay) M Filippini	6	3	0
Q	(Spain) JC Báguena	7	6	2
(West Germany) M Rackl	6	7	6
(West Germany) P Baur	3	2
2	(Sweden) K Carlsson	6	6

Second round
6	(Brazil) L Mattar	6	6
(Spain) F Luna	3	4
(Italy) C Pistolesi	2	1
3	(Austria) T Muster	6	6
(Peru) P Arraya	2	2
(Austria) H Skoff	6	6
(West Germany) M Rackl	2	2
2	(Sweden) K Carlsson	6	6

Quarterfinals
6	(Brazil) L Mattar	5	2
3	(Austria) T Muster	7	6
(Austria) H Skoff	w/o
2	(Sweden) K Carlsson

Semifinals
3	(Austria) T Muster	4	6	7
(Austria) H Skoff	6	4	5
