= 1989 Monte Carlo Open =

- Date: 24–30 April
- Edition: 83rd
- Category: Grand Prix
- Draw: 48S / 24D
- Prize money: $405,000
- Surface: Clay / outdoor
- Location: Roquebrune-Cap-Martin, France
- Venue: Monte Carlo Country Club

Champions

Singles
- (Argentina) Alberto Mancini

Doubles
- (Czechoslovakia) Tomáš Šmíd / (Australia) Mark Woodforde
← 1988 ·	Monte Carlo Open	· 1990 →

The 1989 Monte Carlo Open, also known by its sponsored name Volvo Monte Carlo Open, was a men's tennis tournament played on outdoor clay courts at the Monte Carlo Country Club in Roquebrune-Cap-Martin in France that was part of the 1989 Nabisco Grand Prix. It was the 83rd edition of the tournament and was held from 24 April through 30 April 1989. Alberto Mancini, who was seeded 14th, won the singles title and earned $122,000 first-prize money.

== Finals ==
=== Singles ===
(Argentina) Alberto Mancini defeated (West Germany) Boris Becker 7–5, 2–6, 7–6, 7–5

- It Mancini's 1st singles title of the year and the 2nd of his career.

=== Doubles ===
(Czechoslovakia) Tomáš Šmíd / (Australia) Mark Woodforde defeated (Italy) Paolo Canè / (Italy) Diego Nargiso 1–6, 6–4, 6–2

- It was Šmíd's 2nd title of the year and the 62nd of his career. It was Woodforde's 2nd title of the year and the 6th of his career.
