= 1989 Athens Open =

- Date: 10–16 April
- Edition: 4th
- Category: Grand Prix
- Draw: 32S / 16D
- Prize money: $93,400
- Surface: Clay / outdoor
- Location: Athens, Greece

Champions

Singles
- (Haiti) Ronald Agénor

Doubles
- (Italy) Claudio Panatta / (Czechoslovakia) Tomáš Šmíd
- ATP Athens Open

The 1989 Athens Open was a men's tennis tournament played on outdoor clay courts in Athens in Greece that was part of the 1989 Nabisco Grand Prix. It was the fourth edition of the tournament and was held from 10 April through 16 April 1989. Second-seeded Ronald Agénor won the singles title.

== Finals ==
=== Singles ===
(Haiti) Ronald Agénor defeated (Sweden) Kent Carlsson 6–3, 6–4

- It was Agénor's only singles title of the year and the 1st of his career.

=== Doubles ===
(Italy) Claudio Panatta / (Czechoslovakia) Tomáš Šmíd defeated (Argentina) Gustavo Giussani / (Argentina) Gerardo Mirad 6–3, 6–2

- It was Panatta's only title of the year and the 7th of his career. It was Šmíd's 2nd title of the year and the 62nd of his career.

== See also ==
- 1989 Athens Trophy – women's tournament
