= 1986 Master Bologna =

- Date: 9–15 June
- Edition: 2nd
- Category: Grand Prix
- Draw: 32S / 16D
- Prize money: $85,000
- Surface: Clay / outdoor
- Location: Bologna, Italy

Champions

Singles
- (Argentina) Martín Jaite

Doubles
- (Italy) Paolo Canè / (Italy) Simone Colombo
- Bologna Outdoor

The 1986 Master Bologna was a men's tennis tournament played on outdoor clay courts in Bologna, Italy that was part of the 1986 Nabisco Grand Prix circuit. It was the second edition of the tournament and was played from 9 June until 15 June 1986. First-seeded Martín Jaite won the singles title.

== Finals ==
=== Singles ===
(Argentina) Martín Jaite defeated (Italy) Paolo Canè 6–2, 4–6, 6–4

- It was Jaite's 1st singles title of the year and the 2nd of his career.

=== Doubles ===
(Italy) Paolo Canè / (Italy) Simone Colombo defeated (Italy) Claudio Panatta / (United States) Blaine Willenborg 6–1, 6–2
