= 1988 Monte Carlo Open – Singles =

Singles
- 1988 Monte Carlo Open

Final
- Champion: (Czechoslovakia) Ivan Lendl
- Runner-up: (Argentina) Martín Jaite
- Score: 5–7, 6–4, 7–5, 6–3

Details
- Draw: 48 (6Q / 2WC)
- Seeds: 16

Events
Singles	Doubles
- Monte Carlo Open

Mats Wilander was the defending champion, but lost to Claudio Pistolesi in the third round.

Ivan Lendl won the title, defeating Martín Jaite 5–7, 6–4, 7–5, 6–3 in the final.

== Seeds ==
All sixteen seeds received a bye to the second round.

1. (Czechoslovakia) Ivan Lendl (champion)
2. (Sweden) Mats Wilander (third round)
3. (West Germany) Boris Becker (second round)
4. (France) Yannick Noah (semifinals)
5. (Ecuador) Andrés Gómez (quarterfinals)
6. (Sweden) Kent Carlsson (third round)
7. (Argentina) Martín Jaite (final)
8. (Spain) Emilio Sánchez (second round)
9. (Soviet Union) Andrei Chesnokov (third round)
10. (Sweden) Joakim Nyström (quarterfinals)
11. (France) Henri Leconte (quarterfinals)
12. (Sweden) Jonas Svensson (second round)
13. (Socialist Federal Republic of Yugoslavia) Slobodan Živojinović (second round)
14. (Argentina) Guillermo Pérez Roldán (second round)
15. (United States) Aaron Krickstein (second round)
16. (Switzerland) Claudio Mezzadri (second round)

== Draw ==
Key

- Q = Qualifier
- WC = Wild card
- LL = Lucky loser
- Alt = Alternate
- ITF = ITF entry
- PR = Protected ranking
- SR = Special ranking
- SE = Special exempt
- JE = Junior exempt
- JR = Junior Accelerator Programme entrant
- CO = College Accelerator Programme entrant
- NG = Next Gen Accelerator Program entrant
- w/o = Walkover
- r = Retired
- d = Defaulted

=== Finals ===
Quarterfinals
1	(Czechoslovakia) Ivan Lendl	7	6
10	(Sweden) Joakim Nyström	6	2
4	(France) Yannick Noah	2	7	6
11	(France) Henri Leconte	6	6	3
5	(Ecuador) Andrés Gómez	5	1
WC	(France) Thierry Tulasne	7	6
7	(Argentina) Martín Jaite	6	6
Q	(Italy) Claudio Pistolesi	2	0

Semifinals
1	(Czechoslovakia) Ivan Lendl	4	7	6
4	(France) Yannick Noah	6	6	3
WC	(France) Thierry Tulasne	4	2
7	(Argentina) Martín Jaite	6	6

Final
1	(Czechoslovakia) Ivan Lendl	5	6	7	6
7	(Argentina) Martín Jaite	7	4	5	3

=== Top half ===
==== Section 1 ====
First round
(Austria) T Muster	4	3
Q	(Sweden) C Bergström	6	6
(Austria) H Skoff	6	6
(Sweden) J Gunnarsson	0	2
(Netherlands) M Schapers	6	6
(West Germany) E Jelen	1	4
(West Germany) T Meinecke	6	6
Q	(Spain) J Aguilera	0	3

Second round
1	(Czechoslovakia) I Lendl	7	7
Q	(Sweden) C Bergström	6	5
(Austria) H Skoff	6	6
16	(Switzerland) C Mezzadri	4	3
10	(Sweden) J Nyström	6	7
(Netherlands) M Schapers	3	6
(West Germany) T Meinecke	6	6
8	(Spain) E Sánchez	3	3

Third round
1	(Czechoslovakia) I Lendl	6	7
(Austria) H Skoff	3	5
10	(Sweden) J Nyström	6	6
(West Germany) T Meinecke	2	2

Quarterfinals
1	(Czechoslovakia) I Lendl	7	6
10	(Sweden) J Nyström	6	2

==== Section 2 ====
First round
(France) G Forget	6	6
(West Germany) C-U Steeb	3	4
Q	(Spain) J Arrese	7	6
(Haiti) R Agénor	6	1
(Czechoslovakia) T Šmíd	2	6	6
(United States) J Arias	6	4	1
(Italy) P Canè	6	4	4
(West Germany) R Osterthun	4	6	6

Second round
4	(France) Y Noah	5	7	6
(France) G Forget	7	6	3
Q	(Spain) J Arrese	6	6	6
13	(Socialist Federal Republic of Yugoslavia) S Živojinović	2	7	4
11	(France) H Leconte	6	7
(Czechoslovakia) T Šmíd	4	5
(West Germany) R Osterthun	2	4
6	(Sweden) K Carlsson	6	6

Third round
4	(France) Y Noah	6	1	7
Q	(Spain) J Arrese	3	6	6
11	(France) H Leconte	6	6
6	(Sweden) K Carlsson	4	3

Quarterfinals
4	(France) Y Noah	2	7	6
11	(France) H Leconte	6	6	3

=== Bottom half ===
==== Section 3 ====
First round
(Argentina) G Vilas	6	3	0
Q	(Uruguay) M Filippini	2	6	6
WC	(France) T Benhabiles	6	6
(Argentina) E Bengoechea	2	3
(United States) J Pugh	6	2	3
WC	(France) T Tulasne	3	6	6
(Australia) M Woodforde	0	5
(Czechoslovakia) M Vajda	6	7

Second round
5	(Ecuador) A Gómez	7	6
Q	(Uruguay) M Filippini	6	4
WC	(France) T Benhabiles	1	7	6
12	(Sweden) J Svensson	6	6	3
14	(Argentina) G Pérez Roldán	1	5
WC	(France) T Tulasne	6	7
(Czechoslovakia) M Vajda	6	5	6
3	(West Germany) B Becker	3	7	1

Third round
5	(Ecuador) A Gómez	6	6
WC	(France) T Benhabiles	4	1
WC	(France) T Tulasne	6	6
(Czechoslovakia) M Vajda	3	1

Quarterfinals
5	(Ecuador) A Gómez	5	1
WC	(France) T Tulasne	7	6

==== Section 4 ====
First round
SE	(Argentina) A Mancini	4	6	6
(Australia) D Cahill	6	3	2
(Sweden) U Stenlund	6	1	6
SE	(France) J Potier	2	6	1
Q	(Italy) C Pistolesi	6	7
(Sweden) P Lundgren	3	6
(Brazil) L Mattar	2	6
Q	(Sweden) N Kroon	6	7

Second round
7	(Argentina) M Jaite	6	6
SE	(Argentina) A Mancini	2	1
(Sweden) U Stenlund	3	4
9	(Soviet Union) A Chesnokov	6	6
15	(United States) A Krickstein	6	2
Q	(Italy) C Pistolesi	7	6
Q	(Sweden) N Kroon	4	2
2	(Sweden) M Wilander	6	6

Third round
7	(Argentina) M Jaite	6	6
9	(Soviet Union) A Chesnokov	3	2
Q	(Italy) C Pistolesi	2	7	6
2	(Sweden) M Wilander	6	6	2

Quarterfinals
7	(Argentina) M Jaite	6	6
Q	(Italy) C Pistolesi	2	0
