= 1986 Campionati Internazionali di Sicilia =

- Date: 29 September – 5 October
- Edition: 8th
- Category: Grand Prix
- Draw: 32S / 16D
- Prize money: $100,000
- Surface: Clay / outdoor
- Location: Palermo, Italy

Champions

Singles
- (Sweden) Ulf Stenlund

Doubles
- (Italy) Paolo Canè / (Italy) Simone Colombo
← 1985 ·	Campionati Internazionali di Sicilia	· 1987 →

The 1986 Campionati Internazionali di Sicilia was a men's tennis tournament played on outdoor clay courts in Palermo, Italy that was part of the 1986 Nabisco Grand Prix. It was the eighth edition of the tournament and took place from 29 September until 5 October 1986. First-seeded Ulf Stenlund won the singles title.

== Finals ==
=== Singles ===
(Sweden) Ulf Stenlund defeated (Peru) Pablo Arraya 6–2, 6–3

- It was Stenlund's only singles title of his career.

=== Doubles ===
(Italy) Paolo Canè / (Italy) Simone Colombo defeated (Switzerland) Claudio Mezzadri / (Italy) Gianni Ocleppo 7–5, 6–3
