= 1988 Bordeaux Open =

- Date: 25–29 July
- Edition: 11th
- Category: Grand Prix
- Draw: 32S / 16D
- Prize money: $215,000
- Surface: Clay / outdoor
- Location: Bordeaux, France
- Venue: Villa Primrose

Champions

Singles
- (Austria) Thomas Muster

Doubles
- (Sweden) Joakim Nyström / (Italy) Claudio Panatta
- Bordeaux Open

The 1988 Bordeaux Open also known as the Nabisco Grand Prix Passing Shot was a men's tennis tournament played on clay courts at Villa Primrose in Bordeaux, France that was part of the 1988 Nabisco Grand Prix circuit. It was the 11th edition of the tournament and was held from 25 July until 29 July 1988. Third-seeded Thomas Muster won the singles title.

== Finals ==
=== Singles ===
(Austria) Thomas Muster defeated (Haiti) Ronald Agénor 6–3, 6–3

- It was Muster's 2nd singles title of the year and the 3rd of his career.

=== Doubles ===
(Sweden) Joakim Nyström / (Italy) Claudio Panatta defeated (Argentina) Christian Miniussi / (Italy) Diego Nargiso 6–1, 6–4
