= 1989 Campionati Internazionali di Sicilia =

- Date: 25 September – 1 October
- Edition: 11th
- Category: Grand Prix
- Draw: 32S / 16D
- Prize money: $93,400
- Surface: Clay / outdoor
- Location: Palermo, Italy

Champions

Singles
- (Argentina) Guillermo Pérez Roldán

Doubles
- (West Germany) Peter Ballauff / (West Germany) Rüdiger Haas
- Campionati Internazionali di Sicilia

The 1989 Campionati Internazionali di Sicilia was a men's tennis tournament played on outdoor clay courts in Palermo, Italy that was part of the 1989 Nabisco Grand Prix. It was the 11th edition of the tournament and took place from 25 September until 1 October 1989. Seventh-seeded Guillermo Pérez Roldán won the singles title.

== Finals ==
=== Singles ===
(Argentina) Guillermo Pérez Roldán defeated (Spain) Paolo Canè 6–1, 6–4

- It was Pérez Roldán's 1st singles title of the year and the 5th of his career.

=== Doubles ===
(West Germany) Peter Ballauff / (West Germany) Rüdiger Haas defeated (Socialist Federal Republic of Yugoslavia) Goran Ivanišević / (Italy) Diego Nargiso 6–2, 6–7, 6–4
