= 1988 Campionati Internazionali di Sicilia – Singles =

Singles
- 1988 Campionati Internazionali di Sicilia

Final
- Champion: (Sweden) Mats Wilander
- Runner-up: (Sweden) Kent Carlsson
- Score: 6–1, 3–6, 6–4

Details
- Draw: 48 (2WC/6Q)
- Seeds: 16

Events
Singles	Doubles
- Campionati Internazionali di Sicilia

Martín Jaite was the defending champion, but did not compete this year.

Mats Wilander won the title by defeating Kent Carlsson 6–1, 3–6, 6–4 in the final.

== Seeds ==
All seeds received a bye to the second round.

1. (Sweden) Mats Wilander (champion)
2. (Sweden) Kent Carlsson (final)
3. (Argentina) Guillermo Pérez Roldán (semifinals)
4. (Austria) Thomas Muster (semifinals)
5. (Spain) Jordi Arrese (third round)
6. (Uruguay) Marcelo Filippini (second round)
7. (Argentina) Alberto Mancini (third round)
8. (United States) Lawson Duncan (second round)
9. (Spain) Fernando Luna (third round)
10. (Argentina) Eduardo Bengoechea (quarterfinals)
11. (France) Thierry Tulasne (quarterfinals)
12. (Argentina) Horacio de la Peña (quarterfinals)
13. (Czechoslovakia) Tomáš Šmíd (third round)
14. (Italy) Francesco Cancellotti (second round)
15. (Argentina) Franco Davín (third round)
16. (France) Thierry Champion (second round)

== Draw ==
Key

- Q = Qualifier
- WC = Wild card
- LL = Lucky loser
- Alt = Alternate
- ITF = ITF entry
- PR = Protected ranking
- SR = Special ranking
- SE = Special exempt
- JE = Junior exempt
- JR = Junior Accelerator Programme entrant
- CO = College Accelerator Programme entrant
- NG = Next Gen Accelerator Program entrant
- w/o = Walkover
- r = Retired
- d = Defaulted

=== Finals ===
Quarterfinals
1/WC	(Sweden) Mats Wilander	4	6	6
(Italy) Claudio Panatta	6	2	3
3	(Argentina) Guillermo Pérez Roldán	6	7
12	(Argentina) Horacio de la Peña	4	6
11	(France) Thierry Tulasne	3	4
4	(Austria) Thomas Muster	6	6
10	(Argentina) Eduardo Bengoechea	1	7	3
2	(Sweden) Kent Carlsson	6	5	6

Semifinals
1/WC	(Sweden) Mats Wilander	6	6
3	(Argentina) Guillermo Pérez Roldán	2	2
4	(Austria) Thomas Muster	6	5
2	(Sweden) Kent Carlsson	7	7

Final
1/WC	(Sweden) Mats Wilander	6	3	6
2	(Sweden) Kent Carlsson	1	6	4

=== Top half ===
==== Section 1 ====
First round
(Czechoslovakia) M Vajda	3	6	2
Q	(West Germany) M Zillner	6	2	6
(Czechoslovakia) B Stankovič	6	4	6
WC	(Italy) F Di Mauro	3	6	2
(West Germany) M Rackl	7	6
(Argentina) R Argüello	6	4
(Sweden) T Haldin	3	6	6
(Italy) C Panatta	6	4	7

Second round
1/WC	(Sweden) M Wilander	6	6
Q	(West Germany) M Zillner	3	3
(Czechoslovakia) B Stankovič	4	1
15	(Argentina) F Davín	6	6
9	(Spain) F Luna	6	6
(West Germany) M Rackl	1	2
(Italy) C Panatta	3	6	6
8	(United States) L Duncan	6	2	2

Third round
1/WC	(Sweden) M Wilander	6	7
15	(Argentina) F Davín	1	6
9	(Spain) F Luna	1	1
(Italy) C Panatta	6	6

Quarterfinals
1/WC	(Sweden) M Wilander	4	6	6
(Italy) C Panatta	6	2	3

==== Section 2 ====
First round
(Argentina) C Miniussi	7	7
(Chile) P Rebolledo	5	5
(Sweden) C Allgårdh	4	7	6
(Peru) P Arraya	6	5	3
(Italy) M Cierro	6	3	7
(West Germany) H Schwaier	4	6	5
Q	(Chile) R Gajardo	0	2
(Czechoslovakia) J Čihák	6	6

Second round
3	(Argentina) G Pérez Roldán	6	6
(Argentina) C Miniussi	2	4
(Sweden) C Allgårdh	6	6
14	(Italy) F Cancellotti	4	2
12	(Argentina) H de la Peña	5	6	7
(Italy) M Cierro	7	1	5
(Czechoslovakia) J Čihák	6	3	3
5	(Spain) J Arrese	1	6	6

Third round
3	(Argentina) G Pérez Roldán	4	6	6
(Sweden) C Allgårdh	6	1	1
12	(Argentina) H de la Peña	6	6
5	(Spain) J Arrese	3	4

Quarterfinals
3	(Argentina) G Pérez Roldán	6	7
12	(Argentina) H de la Peña	4	6

=== Bottom half ===
==== Section 3 ====
First round
(France) O Delaître	3	4
(Italy) M Narducci	6	6
(Italy) C Pistolesi	2	6	7
Q	(Socialist Federal Republic of Yugoslavia) G Prpić	6	4	6
(Italy) Marco Filippeschi	1	2
(Brazil) M Hennemann	6	6
(West Germany) D Keretić	2	4
(Spain) J Aguilera	6	6

Second round
6	(Uruguay) M Filippini	0	3
(Italy) M Narducci	6	6
(Italy) C Pistolesi	6	5	4
11	(France) T Tulasne	3	7	6
13	(Czechoslovakia) T Šmíd	6	7
(Brazil) M Hennemann	0	6
(Spain) J Aguilera	0	2
4	(Austria) T Muster	6	6

Third round
(Italy) M Narducci	5	6	4
11	(France) T Tulasne	7	1	6
13	(Czechoslovakia) T Šmíd	4	2
4	(Austria) T Muster	6	6

Quarterfinals
11	(France) T Tulasne	3	4
4	(Austria) T Muster	6	6

==== Section 4 ====
First round
Q	(Argentina) G Mirad	6	6
Q	(West Germany) F Dennhardt	3	4
(Spain) J Avendaño	6	6
Q	(Spain) J Clavet	1	4
(Argentina) R Azar	5	4
(United States) J Brown	7	6
(Czechoslovakia) K Nováček	3	6
(Ecuador) R Viver	6	7

Second round
7	(Argentina) A Mancini	6	6
Q	(Argentina) G Mirad	3	2
(Spain) J Avendaño	7	3	2
10	(Argentina) E Bengoechea	5	6	6
16	(France) T Champion	6	1	6
(United States) J Brown	3	6	7
(Ecuador) R Viver	3	6	4
2	(Sweden) K Carlsson	6	3	6

Third round
7	(Argentina) A Mancini	5	0
10	(Argentina) E Bengoechea	7	6
(United States) J Brown	2	4
2	(Sweden) K Carlsson	6	6

Quarterfinals
10	(Argentina) E Bengoechea	1	7	3
2	(Sweden) K Carlsson	6	5	6
