= 1985 Campionati Internazionali di Sicilia =

- Date: 9–15 September
- Edition: 7th
- Category: Grand Prix
- Draw: 32S / 16D
- Prize money: $100,000
- Surface: Clay / outdoor
- Location: Palermo, Italy

Champions

Singles
- (France) Thierry Tulasne

Doubles
- (United Kingdom) Colin Dowdeswell / (Sweden) Joakim Nyström
← 1984 ·	Campionati Internazionali di Sicilia	· 1986 →

The 1985 Campionati Internazionali di Sicilia, also known by its sponsored name Kim Top Line Trophy, was a men's tennis tournament played on outdoor clay courts in Palermo, Italy that was part of the 1985 Nabisco Grand Prix. It was the seventh edition of the tournament and took place from 9 September until 15 September 1985. Eighth-seeded Thierry Tulasne won the singles title.

== Finals ==
=== Singles ===
(France) Thierry Tulasne defeated (Sweden) Joakim Nyström 6–3, 6–1

- It was Tulasne's 2nd singles title of the year and the 3rd of his career.

=== Doubles ===
(United Kingdom) Colin Dowdeswell / (Sweden) Joakim Nyström defeated (Spain) Sergio Casal / (Spain) Emilio Sánchez 6–4, 6–7, 7–6
