= 1989 French Open – Men's singles =

Men's singles
- 1989 French Open

Final
- Champion: (United States) Michael Chang
- Runner-up: (Sweden) Stefan Edberg
- Score: 6–1, 3–6, 4–6, 6–4, 6–2

Details
- Draw: 128
- Seeds: 16

Events
Singles	men	women		boys	girls
Doubles	men	women	mixed	boys	girls
WC Singles	men	women	quad
WC Doubles	men	women	quad
Legends	−45	45+	women
- French Open

Michael Chang defeated Stefan Edberg in the final, 6–1, 3–6, 4–6, 6–4, 6–2 to win the men's singles tennis title at the 1989 French Open. It was his first and only major title. Chang became the youngest-ever men's singles major champion, winning the final at the age of 17 years, 109 days, and the first player (male or female) of Asian descent to win a major. En route to the title, he defeated the world No. 1 and three-time champion Ivan Lendl, which is remembered as one of the most significant matches in French Open history.

Mats Wilander was the defending champion, but he lost in the quarterfinals to Andrei Chesnokov.

This tournament marked the first major and French Open appearances of future two-time French Open champions Sergi Bruguera and Jim Courier, respectively.

== Seeds ==
1. (Czechoslovakia) Ivan Lendl (fourth round)
2. (West Germany) Boris Becker (semifinals)
3. (Sweden) Stefan Edberg (final)
4. (Sweden) Mats Wilander (quarterfinals)
5. (United States) Andre Agassi (third round)
6. (Switzerland) Jakob Hlasek (fourth round)
7. (United States) Tim Mayotte (second round)
8. (Czechoslovakia) Miloslav Mečíř (first round)
9. (United States) Jimmy Connors (second round)
10. (Sweden) Kent Carlsson (withdrew due to knee injury)
11. (Argentina) Alberto Mancini (quarterfinals)
12. (United States) Brad Gilbert (withdrew)
13. (France) Yannick Noah (first round)
14. (United States) Aaron Krickstein (second round)
15. (United States) Michael Chang (champion)
16. (Argentina) Guillermo Pérez Roldán (fourth round)

== Draw ==
Key

- Q = Qualifier
- WC = Wild card
- LL = Lucky loser
- Alt = Alternate
- ITF = ITF entry
- PR = Protected ranking
- SR = Special ranking
- SE = Special exempt
- JE = Junior exempt
- JR = Junior Accelerator Programme entrant
- CO = College Accelerator Programme entrant
- NG = Next Gen Accelerator Program entrant
- w/o = Walkover
- r = Retired
- d = Defaulted

=== Finals ===
Quarterfinals
15	(United States) Michael Chang	6	2	6	7
(Haiti) Ronald Agénor	4	6	4	6
4	(Sweden) Mats Wilander	4	0	5
(Soviet Union) Andrei Chesnokov	6	6	7
11	(Argentina) Alberto Mancini	1	3	6
3	(Sweden) Stefan Edberg	6	6	7
(United States) Jay Berger	3	4	1
2	(West Germany) Boris Becker	6	6	6

Semifinals
15	(United States) Michael Chang	6	5	7	7
(Soviet Union) Andrei Chesnokov	1	7	6	5
3	(Sweden) Stefan Edberg	6	6	5	3	6
2	(West Germany) Boris Becker	3	4	7	6	2

Final
15	(United States) Michael Chang	6	3	4	6	6
3	(Sweden) Stefan Edberg	1	6	6	4	2

=== Top half ===
==== Section 1 ====
First round
1	(Czechoslovakia) I Lendl	7	6	6
(West Germany) P Kühnen	6	3	1
(France) O Delaître	3	2	6
(United States) D Rostagno	6	6	7
(Sweden) J Gunnarsson	7	5	6	6
WC	(France) F Fontang	6	7	4	1
(South Africa) N Broad	4	1	4
(Australia) D Cahill	6	6	6
(United States) T Witsken	6	6	6
(West Germany) U Riglewski	2	1	4
Q	(Soviet Union) A Olhovskiy	4	3	2
Q	(Spain) F Roig	6	6	6
(Mexico) J Lozano	3	2	4
(United States) P Sampras	6	6	6
(Belgium) E Masso	7	3	0	3
15	(United States) M Chang	6	6	6	6

Second round
1	(Czechoslovakia) I Lendl	6	6	6
(United States) D Rostagno	1	3	1
(Sweden) J Gunnarsson	7	3	2	5
(Australia) D Cahill	5	6	6	7
(United States) T Witsken	6	7	1	6
Q	(Spain) F Roig	7	6	6	7
(United States) P Sampras	1	1	1
15	(United States) M Chang	6	6	6

Third round
1	(Czechoslovakia) I Lendl	7	6	6
(Australia) D Cahill	6	3	3
Q	(Spain) F Roig	0	5	3
15	(United States) M Chang	6	7	6

Fourth round
1	(Czechoslovakia) I Lendl	6	6	3	3	3
15	(United States) M Chang	4	4	6	6	6

==== Section 2 ====
First round
LL	(Brazil) D Marcelino	2	2	2
(Czechoslovakia) K Nováček	6	6	6
(Switzerland) C Mezzadri	4	1	3
WC	(France) A Boetsch	6	6	6
(Portugal) N Marques	4	6	6	4	3
(Spain) S Bruguera	6	4	4	6	6
(West Germany) E Jelen	6	7	7
Q	(France) C Pioline	4	5	5
(Italy) C Pistolesi	6	6	6
WC	(Argentina) G Vilas	1	3	4
WC	(France) F Santoro	6	6	3	4	6
Q	(United States) D Wheaton	3	0	6	6	8
Q	(Australia) C Limberger	4	2	1
(Haiti) R Agénor	6	6	6
(Australia) M Kratzmann	1	2	3
7	(United States) T Mayotte	6	6	6

Second round
(Czechoslovakia) K Nováček	6	6	6
WC	(France) A Boetsch	3	3	3
(Spain) S Bruguera	5	7	7	7
(West Germany) E Jelen	7	6	6	6
(Italy) C Pistolesi	7	7	6
Q	(United States) D Wheaton	6	5	2
(Haiti) R Agénor	3	7	5	7	6
7	(United States) T Mayotte	6	5	7	5	2

Third round
(Czechoslovakia) K Nováček	4	1	6	3
(Spain) S Bruguera	6	6	1	6
(Italy) C Pistolesi	6	1	4	3
(Haiti) R Agénor	1	6	6	6

Fourth round
(Spain) S Bruguera	6	6	3	1	2
(Haiti) R Agénor	2	3	6	6	6

==== Section 3 ====
First round
4	(Sweden) M Wilander	6	6	6
Q	(Spain) T Carbonell	3	3	3
Q	(West Germany) P Vojtíšek	0	3	2
Q	(Uruguay) D Pérez	6	6	6
(Soviet Union) A Võsand	3	7	2	7	6
Q	(West Germany) A Mronz	6	6	6	6	3
(Italy) O Camporese	7	1	6	4	8
(Czechoslovakia) J Čihák	6	6	3	6	6
(Canada) A Sznajder	2	0	6	7	6
(United States) D Goldie	6	6	2	6	3
(United States) L Duncan	4	6	7	6
(France) T Champion	6	4	6	1
(Brazil) C Motta	7	6	3	1	0
WC	(France) J Potier	5	2	6	6	6
(Brazil) L Mattar	7	6	6	6
13	(France) Y Noah	6	4	7	4

Second round
4	(Sweden) M Wilander	6	7	6
Q	(Uruguay) D Pérez	3	6	3
(Soviet Union) A Võsand	6	7	3	2
(Italy) O Camporese	7	6	6	6
(Canada) A Sznajder	2	1	3
(United States) L Duncan	6	6	6
WC	(France) J Potier	6	7	6	3	6
(Brazil) L Mattar	4	6	7	6	3

Third round
4	(Sweden) M Wilander	6	6	7
(Italy) O Camporese	4	3	6
(United States) L Duncan	6	6	6
WC	(France) J Potier	4	0	4

Fourth round
4	(Sweden) M Wilander	7	6	6
(United States) L Duncan	5	3	2

==== Section 4 ====
First round
LL	(Peru) P Arraya	4	5	6
(Soviet Union) A Chesnokov	6	7	7
(Sweden) J Svensson	7	7	6
(Sweden) N Kulti	6	5	3
(West Germany) C-U Steeb	6	7	6
(Australia) J Stoltenberg	3	5	3
Q	(Spain) A Tous	6	6	2	6
(Netherlands) T Nijssen	2	4	6	4
(Czechoslovakia) M Šrejber	6	6	2	2
(United States) J Brown	2	7	6	6
(United States) J Courier	6	6	7
(Finland) V Paloheimo	3	4	6
(Italy) P Canè	3	1	6	6	6
(Sweden) M Gustafsson	6	6	3	3	3
(Sweden) J Carlsson	3	4	1
5	(United States) A Agassi	6	6	6

Second round
(Soviet Union) A Chesnokov	3	6	6	6
(Sweden) J Svensson	6	1	4	0
(West Germany) C-U Steeb	7	6	7
Q	(Spain) A Tous	5	4	5
(United States) J Brown	0	5	1
(United States) J Courier	6	7	6
(Italy) P Canè	2	2	3
5	(United States) A Agassi	6	6	6

Third round
(Soviet Union) A Chesnokov	3	6	7	6
(West Germany) C-U Steeb	6	1	5	3
(United States) J Courier	7	4	6	6
5	(United States) A Agassi	6	6	3	2

Fourth round
(Soviet Union) A Chesnokov	2	3	7	6	7
(United States) J Courier	6	6	6	2	5

=== Bottom half ===
==== Section 5 ====
First round
6	(Switzerland) J Hlasek	6	1	2	6	9
(Spain) J Arrese	4	6	6	4	7
(Ecuador) A Gómez	7	3	6	6
WC	(Argentina) JL Clerc	6	6	1	3
(Netherlands) M Schapers	7	3	6	3	3
(Mexico) L Lavalle	6	6	4	6	6
(Spain) F Luna	6	3	7	3	5
Q	(Denmark) M Tauson	0	6	6	6	7
Q	(Netherlands) P Haarhuis	5	6	6	3	6
(Socialist Federal Republic of Yugoslavia) S Živojinović	7	1	2	6	4
(United States) J Grabb	3	6	5	2
(West Germany) C Saceanu	6	3	7	6
(Argentina) M Jaite	6	6	6
(Uruguay) M Filippini	3	4	2
(Australia) S Youl	5	2	3
11	(Argentina) A Mancini	7	6	6

Second round
6	(Switzerland) J Hlasek	6	6	6
(Ecuador) A Gómez	4	2	2
(Mexico) L Lavalle	6	6	6
Q	(Denmark) M Tauson	4	1	2
Q	(Netherlands) P Haarhuis	6	6	7	6
(West Germany) C Saceanu	7	2	6	1
(Argentina) M Jaite	6	4	3
11	(Argentina) A Mancini	7	6	6

Third round
6	(Switzerland) J Hlasek	4	6	3	6	6
(Mexico) L Lavalle	6	1	6	3	4
Q	(Netherlands) P Haarhuis	4	4	3
11	(Argentina) A Mancini	6	6	6

Fourth round
6	(Switzerland) J Hlasek	4	4	6	6	4
11	(Argentina) A Mancini	6	6	4	2	6

==== Section 6 ====
First round
14	(United States) A Krickstein	4	6	5	6	6
Q	(Czechoslovakia) R Vogel	6	3	7	2	0
Q	(Italy) R Furlan	6	4	3	6
(Australia) M Woodforde	3	6	6	7
(West Germany) M Stich	7	6	6
(The Bahamas) R Smith	5	2	0
(Socialist Federal Republic of Yugoslavia) G Ivanišević	0	6	6	6
(United States) R Reneberg	6	2	1	3
(Netherlands) M Koevermans	6	6	1	3
(Sweden) A Järryd	3	7	6	6
(United States) J Arias	6	6	6
(Sweden) M Pernfors	2	2	2
(Sweden) C Bergström	5	6	3
(Venezuela) N Pereira	7	7	6
(Czechoslovakia) M Vajda	2	0	6	3
3	(Sweden) S Edberg	6	6	1	6

Second round
14	(United States) A Krickstein	6	7	4	4	4
(Australia) M Woodforde	1	6	6	6	6
(West Germany) M Stich	2	3	2
(Socialist Federal Republic of Yugoslavia) G Ivanišević	6	6	6
(Sweden) A Järryd	6	5	1
(United States) J Arias	7	7	6
(Venezuela) N Pereira	4	4	2
3	(Sweden) S Edberg	6	6	6

Third round
(Australia) M Woodforde	3	4	0
(Socialist Federal Republic of Yugoslavia) G Ivanišević	6	6	6
(United States) J Arias	4	4	4
3	(Sweden) S Edberg	6	6	6

Fourth round
(Socialist Federal Republic of Yugoslavia) G Ivanišević	5	3	3
3	(Sweden) S Edberg	7	6	6

==== Section 7 ====
First round
8	(Czechoslovakia) M Mečíř	6	4	1	3
(France) T Tulasne	2	6	6	6
(Austria) H Skoff	6	7	6
(Argentina) E Bengoechea	1	6	2
WC	(France) G Raoux	6	6	6	7	4
(France) J-P Fleurian	2	7	7	5	6
(West Germany) T Meinecke	4	2	4
(Soviet Union) A Cherkasov	6	6	6
(Socialist Federal Republic of Yugoslavia) B Orešar	4	2	2
(Peru) J Yzaga	6	6	6
(Socialist Federal Republic of Yugoslavia) G Prpić	7	6	6
Q	(West Germany) F Dennhardt	5	4	2
(Italy) D Nargiso	4	6	3	2
(United States) J Berger	6	3	6	6
(Czechoslovakia) M Střelba	2	6	4	3
9	(United States) J Connors	6	2	6	6

Second round
(France) T Tulasne	3	7	6	4	6
(Austria) H Skoff	6	5	2	6	4
(France) J-P Fleurian	6	7	6
(Soviet Union) A Cherkasov	3	6	3
(Peru) J Yzaga	3	6	6	4	6
(Socialist Federal Republic of Yugoslavia) G Prpić	6	3	3	6	3
(United States) J Berger	4	6	7	7
9	(United States) J Connors	6	3	5	5

Third round
(France) T Tulasne	7	4	6	6	6
(France) J-P Fleurian	6	6	0	7	0
(Peru) J Yzaga	4	2	2
(United States) J Berger	6	6	6

Fourth round
(France) T Tulasne	6	2	0	3
(United States) J Berger	3	6	6	6

==== Section 8 ====
First round
16	(Argentina) G Pérez Roldán	6	6	6
(Spain) S Casal	1	2	0
(Argentina) H de la Peña	6	6	6
(Australia) R Fromberg	4	4	2
(Italy) F Cancellotti	4	6	6	6
(United States) D Pate	6	1	4	2
(Canada) G Michibata	6	6	6
(Sweden) T Svantesson	4	4	4
Q	(United Kingdom) J Bates	6	6	6
(United States) M Davis	0	4	4
(Finland) O Rahnasto	6	6	6
(Sweden) P Lundgren	4	4	2
WC	(France) É Winogradsky	7	6	6
(Spain) J Sánchez	5	4	4
(United States) J Pugh	4	2	3
2	(West Germany) B Becker	6	6	6

Second round
16	(Argentina) G Pérez Roldán	7	2	7	4	6
(Argentina) H de la Peña	6	6	5	6	2
(Italy) F Cancellotti	6	6	6
(Canada) G Michibata	4	4	0
Q	(United Kingdom) J Bates	6	6	6
(Finland) O Rahnasto	3	2	4
WC	(France) É Winogradsky	6	5	3
2	(West Germany) B Becker	7	7	6

Third round
16	(Argentina) G Pérez Roldán	6	3	6	6
(Italy) F Cancellotti	1	6	2	3
Q	(United Kingdom) J Bates	5	1	2
2	(West Germany) B Becker	7	6	6

Fourth round
16	(Argentina) G Pérez Roldán	6	4	2	6	5
2	(West Germany) B Becker	3	6	6	4	7

Preceded by 1989 Australian Open – Men's singles	Grand Slam men's singles	Succeeded by 1989 Wimbledon Championships – Men's singles
