= 1989 Campionati Internazionali della Valle D'Aosta =

- Date: 14–20 August
- Edition: 4th
- Category: Grand Prix
- Draw: 32S / 16D
- Prize money: $125,000
- Surface: Clay / outdoor
- Location: Saint-Vincent, Aosta Valley Italy

Champions

Singles
- (Argentina) Franco Davín

Doubles
- (Czechoslovakia) Josef Čihák / (Czechoslovakia) Cyril Suk
- ATP Saint-Vincent

The 1989 Campionati Internazionali della Valle D'Aosta (International Championships of Valle d'Aosta), was a men's tennis tournament played on outdoor clay courts that was part of the 1989 Nabisco Grand Prix. It was the fourth edition of the tournament and took place in Saint-Vincent, Aosta Valley, Italy, from 14 August until 20 August 1989. Eighth-seeded Franco Davín won the singles title.

== Finals ==
=== Singles ===
(Argentina) Franco Davín defeated (Spain) Juan Aguilera, 6–2, 6–2

- It was Davín's only singles title of the year and the 1st of his career.

=== Doubles ===
(Czechoslovakia) Josef Čihák / (Czechoslovakia) Cyril Suk defeated (Italy) Massimo Cierro / (Italy) Alessandro de Minicis, 6–4, 6–2

- It was Čihák's only doubles title of his career. It was Suk's only doubles title of the year and the 1st of his career.
