= 1988 Monte Carlo Open =

- Date: 18–24 April
- Edition: 82nd
- Category: Grand Prix
- Draw: 48S / 24D
- Prize money: $375,000
- Surface: Clay / outdoor
- Location: Roquebrune-Cap-Martin, France
- Venue: Monte Carlo Country Club

Champions

Singles
- (Czechoslovakia) Ivan Lendl

Doubles
- (Spain) Sergio Casal / (Spain) Emilio Sánchez
- Monte Carlo Open

The 1988 Monte Carlo Open, also known by its sponsored name Volvo Monte Carlo Open, was a men's tennis tournament played on outdoor clay courts at the Monte Carlo Country Club in Roquebrune-Cap-Martin, France that was part of the 1988 Nabisco Grand Prix. It was the 82nd edition of the tournament and was held from 18 April through 24 April 1989. First-seeded Ivan Lendl, who had been sidelined for eight weeks with a stress fracture in his right foot, won the singles title. It was his second singles title at the event after 1985.

== Finals ==
=== Singles ===
(Czechoslovakia) Ivan Lendl defeated (Argentina) Martín Jaite, 5–7, 6–4, 7–5, 6–3

- It was Lendl's 1st singles title of the year and the 71st of his career.

=== Doubles ===
(Spain) Sergio Casal / (Spain) Emilio Sánchez defeated (France) Henri Leconte / (Czechoslovakia) Ivan Lendl, 6–1, 6–3
