= 1987 Campionati Internazionali di Sicilia =

- Date: 28 September – 4 October
- Edition: 9th
- Category: Grand Prix
- Draw: 32S / 16D
- Prize money: $100,000
- Surface: Clay / outdoor
- Location: Palermo, Italy

Champions

Singles
- (Argentina) Martín Jaite

Doubles
- (Mexico) Leonardo Lavalle / (Italy) Claudio Panatta
- Campionati Internazionali di Sicilia

The 1987 Campionati Internazionali di Sicilia was a men's tennis tournament played on outdoor clay courts in Palermo, Italy that was part of the 1987 Nabisco Grand Prix. It was the ninth edition of the tournament and took place from 28 September until 4 October 1987. First-seeded Martín Jaite won the singles title.

== Finals ==
=== Singles ===
(Argentina) Martín Jaite defeated (Czechoslovakia) Karel Nováček 7–6^{(7–5)}, 6–7^{(7–9)}, 6–4

- It was Jaite's 2nd singles title of the year and the 5th of his career.

=== Doubles ===
(Mexico) Leonardo Lavalle / (Italy) Claudio Panatta defeated (Czechoslovakia) Petr Korda / (Czechoslovakia) Tomáš Šmíd 3–6, 6–4, 6–4
