= Alessandro Baldoni =

Italian tennis player

- Country (sports): Italy
- Born: 20 February 1968 (age 57); Rome, Italy
- Plays: Right-handed
- Prize money: $21,575

Singles
- Career record: 0–6
- Highest ranking: No. 224 (28 March 1988)

Doubles
- Career record: 1–8
- Highest ranking: No. 293 (10 August 1987)

Alessandro Baldoni (born 20 February 1968) is an Italian former professional tennis player.

Baldoni, a Rome native, competed on the professional tour in the late 1980s, reaching a career high singles world ranking of 224 and top national ranking of eight. He featured in the singles main draw of six Italian Grand Prix (ATP Tour) tournaments, without making it past the first round, but did win a set against top-50 player Ronald Agénor at the 1988 Italian Open. His best performances on the ATP Challenger Tour came at Marrakech in 1988, where he had wins over Carlos di Laura, Lawson Duncan and Claudio Pistolesi, en route the semi-finals.
