= Gerardo Mirad =

Argentine tennis player

- Country (sports): Argentina
- Born: 25 August 1967 (age 57); Rosario, Argentina
- Height: 5 ft 11 in (180 cm)
- Prize money: $31,088

Singles
- Career record: 1–1
- Highest ranking: No. 266 (7 August 1989)

Doubles
- Career record: 9–12
- Highest ranking: No. 142 (25 September 1989)

Gerardo Mirad (born 25 August 1967) is an Argentine former professional tennis player.

Mirad, who comes from Rosario, started playing tennis at the age of seven and turned professional in 1986. He reached a best singles ranking of 266 in the world and made the second round at the 1989 Campionati Internazionali di Sicilia. In doubles, he was a losing finalist at the 1989 Athens Open, partnering Gustavo Giussani.

== Grand Prix career finals ==
=== Doubles: 1 (0–1) ===
Result	W/L	Date	Tournament	Surface	Partner	Opponents	Score
Loss	0–1	Apr 1989	Athens, Greece	Clay	(Argentina) Gustavo Giussani	(Italy) Claudio Panatta (Czechoslovakia) Tomáš Šmíd	3–6, 2–6

== Challenger titles ==
=== Doubles: (2) ===
No.	Date	Tournament	Surface	Partner	Opponents	Score
1.	July, 1989	São Paulo, Brazil	Clay	(Australia) David Macpherson	(Brazil) Otávio Della (Brazil) Jaime Oncins	2–6, 7–6, 6–2
2.	August, 1989	Lins, Brazil	Clay	(Australia) David Macpherson	(Portugal) João Cunha e Silva (Brazil) Ivan Kley	2–6, 6–3, 6–2
