= Peter Ballauff =

German tennis player

- Country (sports): West Germany
- Born: 29 September 1963 (age 62) Hamburg, West Germany
- Height: 1.88 m (6 ft 2 in)
- Turned pro: 1987
- Plays: Right-handed
- Prize money: $64,538

Singles
- Career record: 3-6
- Career titles: 0
- Highest ranking: No. 179 (15 Jan 1990)

Doubles
- Career record: 10-13
- Career titles: 1
- Highest ranking: No. 115 (18 Dec 1989)

Grand Slam doubles results
- Australian Open: 1R (1990)

Peter Ballauff (born 29 September 1963) is a former professional tennis player from West Germany.

== Career ==
Ballauff was primarily a doubles player but did reach the singles quarter-finals at Palermo in 1989. En route he defeated world number 21 Andrés Gómez.

At the same event, he won the doubles title, partnering Rüdiger Haas.

He made one appearance in a Grand Slam tournament, which was the 1990 Australian Open, with Swede Lars-Anders Wahlgren as his partner. They were defeated in the opening round by Darren Cahill and Mark Kratzmann in a close match, which ended in a 10–8 final set scoreline.

== Grand Prix career finals ==
=== Doubles: 1 (1–0) ===
Result	W–L	Date	Tournament	Surface	Partner	Opponents	Score
Win	1–0	Oct 1989	Palermo, Italy	Clay	(West Germany) Rüdiger Haas	(Socialist Federal Republic of Yugoslavia) Goran Ivanišević (Italy) Diego Nargiso	6–2, 6–7, 6–4

== Challenger titles ==
=== Doubles: (2) ===
Result	No.	Year	Tournament	Surface	Partner	Opponents	Score
Win	1.	1989	Geneva, Switzerland	Clay	(Italy) Ugo Pigato	(France) Arnaud Boetsch (Czechoslovakia) Slava Doseděl	6–4, 6–3
Win	2.	1990	Furth, West Germany	Clay	(West Germany) Ricki Osterthun	(Spain) Marcos Aurelio Gorriz (Soviet Union) Andrei Olhovskiy	7–6, 4–6, 6–3
