= Alberto Tous =

Spanish tennis player (born 1962)

- Country (sports): Spain
- Born: 3 August 1962 (age 64) Palma, Spain
- Height: 1.75 m (5 ft 9 in)
- Plays: Right-handed
- Prize money: $200,221

Singles
- Career record: 40–61
- Career titles: 0
- Highest ranking: No. 52 (10 August 1987)

Grand Slam singles results
- French Open: 2R (1983, 1988, 1989)
- Wimbledon: 1R (1983)

Doubles
- Career record: 40–62
- Career titles: 0
- Highest ranking: No. 36 (15 June 1987)

Grand Slam doubles results
- French Open: SF (1987)

Mixed doubles
- Career titles: 0

Grand Slam mixed doubles results
- French Open: 3R (1988)

Alberto Tous Aguiló (born 3 August 1962) is a former professional tennis player from Spain.

== Career ==
Born in Palma, Majorca, Balearic Islands, Tous was the top ranked Spanish junior in 1979. He made the final of the boys' singles event at the 1980 French Open, which he lost to Henri Leconte.

He reached the quarterfinals at Madrid in 1983 and made two Grand Slam appearances that year. He took part in a Davis Cup tie for his country that year against Yugoslavia.

In 1984, his best result of the year came in Bari, where he reached the quarterfinals.

He made two Grand Prix finals in 1985, at Madrid and Bologna, both in the doubles. As a singles player, he did well in Bologna, making the semifinals.

Tous had his most notable performance in the 1987 French Open, where he reached the semifinals of the men's doubles with José López-Maeso. They lost their semifinal in five sets to eventual champions Anders Järryd and Robert Seguso.

== Grand Prix career finals ==
=== Doubles: 2 (0–2) ===
Result	W-L	Date	Tournament	Surface	Partner	Opponents	Score
Loss	0–1	May 1985	Madrid, Spain	Clay	(Spain) Jorge Bardou	(Brazil) Givaldo Barbosa (Brazil) Ivan Kley	6–7, 4–6
Loss	0–2	Jun 1985	Bologna, Italy	Clay	(Spain) Jordi Arrese	(Italy) Paolo Canè (Italy) Simone Colombo	5–7, 4–6

== Challenger titles ==
=== Singles: (3) ===
No.	Year	Tournament	Surface	Opponent	Score
1.	1984	Agadir, Morocco	Clay	(Belgium) Bernard Boileau	6–1, 6–0
2.	1987	Cairo, Egypt	Clay	(Spain) David de Miguel	6–2, 6–3
3.	1987	Waiblingen, West Germany	Clay	(Switzerland) Roland Stadler	W/O

=== Doubles: (2) ===
No.	Year	Tournament	Surface	Partner	Opponents	Score
1.	1982	Brussels, Belgium	Clay	(Ecuador) Raúl Viver	(Australia) David Graham (Australia) Laurie Warder	3–6, 6–3, 7–5
2.	1987	Casablanca, Morocco	Clay	(Spain) José López-Maeso	(Italy) Massimo Cierro (Italy) Alessandro de Minicis	7–6, 6–2
