= Gustavo Giussani =

Argentine tennis player

- Full name: Gustavo Giussani
- Country (sports): Argentina
- Born: 6 March 1968 (age 57); Salta, Argentina
- Plays: Right-handed
- Prize money: $87,872

Singles
- Career record: 8–18
- Career titles: 0
- Highest ranking: No. 153 (25 September 1989)

Doubles
- Career record: 8–15
- Career titles: 0
- Highest ranking: No. 158 (7 August 1989)

Gustavo Giussani (born 6 March 1968) is a former professional tennis player from Argentina.

== Biography ==
Nicknamed "Pancho", Salta born Giussani was based in Cordoba.

In 1988 he won Challenger titles in Geneva and Bogota.

His best performance on the international circuit came in the doubles at the 1989 Athens Open. He partnered with countryman Gerardo Mirad to finish runners-up, to Claudio Panatta and Tomáš Šmíd. In singles that year he made the quarter-finals at a Grand Prix event in Saint Vincent and had a win over Guillermo Vilas in a Cairo Challenger tournament.

He now works as a tennis talent scout.

== Grand Prix career finals ==
=== Doubles: 1 (0–1) ===
Result	W/L	Date	Tournament	Surface	Partner	Opponents	Score
Loss	0–1	Apr 1989	Athens, Greece	Clay	(Argentina) Gerardo Mirad	(Italy) Claudio Panatta (Czechoslovakia) Tomáš Šmíd	3–6, 2–6

== Challenger titles ==
=== Singles: (3) ===
No.	Year	Tournament	Surface	Opponent	Score
1.	1988	Geneva, Switzerland	Clay	(Italy) Simone Colombo	6–4, 2–6, 6–3
2.	1988	Bogotá, Colombia	Clay	(Argentina) Christian Miniussi	7–6, 5–7, 6–4
3.	1991	Viña del Mar, Chile	Clay	(Argentina) Gabriel Markus	4–6, 6–2, 6–0

=== Doubles: (1) ===
No.	Year	Tournament	Surface	Partner	Opponents	Score
1.	1988	Bogotá, Colombia	Clay	(Argentina) Fabián Blengino	(Argentina) Guillermo Minutella (Argentina) Gerardo Mirad	6–4, 1–6, 7–6
