= Claudio Mezzadri =

Swiss tennis player

- Country (sports): Switzerland
- Born: 10 June 1965 (age 61) Locarno, Switzerland
- Height: 1.82 m (5 ft 11 1/2 in)
- Turned pro: 1983
- Plays: Right-handed (one-handed backhand)
- Prize money: US$ 797,458

Singles
- Career record: 116–137
- Career titles: 1
- Highest ranking: No. 26 (2 November 1987)

Grand Slam singles results
- Australian Open: 2R (1992)
- French Open: 1R (1986, 1988, 1989, 1993)
- Wimbledon: 2R (1986)
- US Open: 2R (1988)

Doubles
- Career record: 84–89
- Career titles: 4
- Highest ranking: No. 23 (22 February 1988)

Claudio Mezzadri (Italian pronunciation: [ˈklaudjo medˈdzaːdri]; born 10 June 1965) is a retired professional tennis player from Switzerland. Mezzadri turned professional in 1983, and won his only ATP singles title four years later in Geneva. He also won four doubles titles in his career. His highest ranking was world No. 26 in singles in November 1987 and No. 23 in doubles in February 1988.

Mezzadri participated in nine Davis Cup ties for Switzerland from 1987 to 1991, posting an 11–4 record in singles and a 3–2 record in doubles.

== Career finals ==
Legend
Grand Slam
Tennis Masters Cup
ATP Masters Series
ATP Tour

=== Singles (1–1) ===
Result	W/L	Date	Tournament	Surface	Opponent	Score
Win	1–0	Sep 1987	Geneva, Switzerland	Clay	(Czechoslovakia) Tomáš Šmíd	6–4, 7–5
Loss	1–1	May 1992	Charlotte, U.S.	Clay	(United States) MaliVai Washington	3–6, 3–6

=== Doubles (4–5) ===
Result	W/L	Date	Tournament	Surface	Partner	Opponents	Score
Loss	0–1	Oct 1986	Palermo, Italy	Clay	(Italy) Gianni Ocleppo	(Italy) Paolo Canè (West Germany) Simone Colombo	5–7, 3–6
Win	1–1	Mar 1987	Nancy, France	Carpet	(India) Ramesh Krishnan	(Canada) Grant Connell (United States) Larry Scott	6–4, 6–4
Loss	1–2	Apr 1987	Nice, France	Clay	(Italy) Gianni Ocleppo	(Spain) Sergio Casal (Spain) Emilio Sánchez	3–6, 3–6
Loss	1–3	May 1987	Hamburg, West Germany	Clay	(United States) Jim Pugh	(Czech Republic) Miloslav Mečíř (Czech Republic) Tomáš Šmíd	6–4, 6–7, 2–6
Win	2–3	Nov 1987	Paris, France	Carpet	(Switzerland) Jakob Hlasek	(United States) Scott Davis (United States) David Pate	7–6, 6–2
Loss	2–4	Sep 1988	Barcelona, Spain	Clay	(Uruguay) Diego Pérez	(Spain) Sergio Casal (Spain) Emilio Sánchez	6–2, 4–6, 7–9
Win	3–4	Jun 1989	Bari, Italy	Clay	(Italy) Simone Colombo	(Spain) Sergio Casal (Spain) Javier Sánchez	0–6, 6–3, 6–3
Win	4–4	Aug 1989	San Marino	Clay	(Italy) Simone Colombo	(Argentina) Pablo Albano (Argentina) Gustavo Luza	6–4, 6–1
Loss	4–4	Oct 1989	Basel, Switzerland	Carpet	(Italy) Omar Camporese	(West Germany) Udo Riglewski (West Germany) Michael Stich	3–6, 6–4, 0–6
