= Paolo Canè =

Italian tennis player

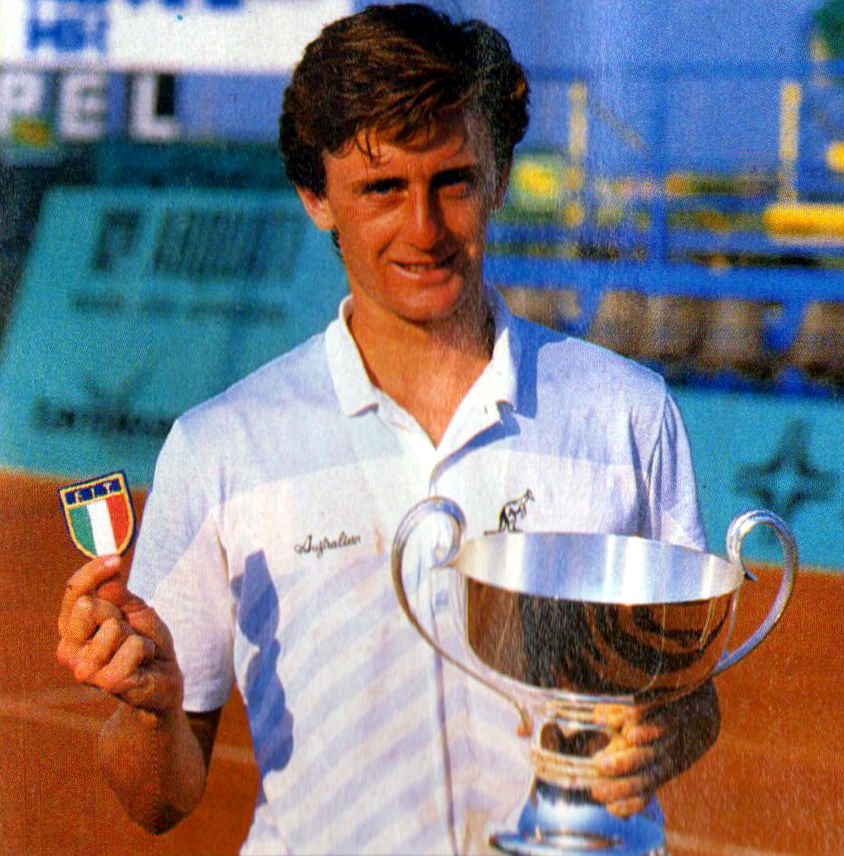
- Paolo Canè in September 1986
- Country (sports): Italy
- Residence: Bologna, Italy
- Born: 9 April 1965 (age 61) Bologna, Italy
- Height: 1.80 m (5 ft 11 in)
- Turned pro: 1983
- Retired: 1997 (brief comeback in 2001)
- Plays: Right-handed (one-handed backhand)
- Prize money: $903,958

Singles
- Career record: 136–131
- Career titles: 3
- Highest ranking: No. 26 (14 August 1989)

Grand Slam singles results
- Australian Open: 2R (1988, 1992)
- French Open: 2R (1989)
- Wimbledon: 2R (1987)
- US Open: 1R (1987)

Other tournaments
- Olympic Games: SF (1984, demonstration)

Doubles
- Career record: 83–91
- Career titles: 3
- Highest ranking: No. 43 (21 October 1985)

Paolo Canè (born 9 April 1965; Italian pronunciation: [ˈpaːolo kaˈnɛ]) is a former tennis player from Italy.

Canè turned professional in 1983. During his career, he won three top-level singles titles (Bordeaux in 1986, Båstad in 1989, and Bologna in 1991) and achieved much success at the Olympics, reaching the semi-finals in 1984 (when it was a demonstration event) and the quarter-finals in 1988. He also won three tour doubles titles (Bologna in 1985, and Bologna and Palermo in 1986).

Canè's career-high rankings were World No. 26 in singles (in 1989) and World No. 43 in doubles (in 1985). He retired from the professional ATP Tour in 1995.

== ATP career finals ==
=== Singles: 5 (3 titles / 2 runner-ups) ===
Result	W/L	Date	Tournament	Surface	Opponent	Score
Loss	0–1	Jun 1986	Bologna, Italy	Clay	(Argentina) Martín Jaite	2–6, 6–4, 4–6
Win	1–1	Jul 1986	Bordeaux, France	Clay	(Sweden) Kent Carlsson	6–4, 1–6, 7–5
Win	2–1	Aug 1989	Båstad, Sweden	Clay	(Socialist Federal Republic of Yugoslavia) Bruno Orešar	7–6^{(7–4)}, 7–6^{(7–5)}
Loss	2–2	Oct 1989	Palermo, Italy	Clay	(Argentina) Guillermo Pérez Roldán	1–6, 4–6
Win	3–2	May 1991	Bologna, Italy	Clay	(Sweden) Jan Gunnarsson	5–7, 6–3, 7–5

=== Doubles: 8 (3 titles / 5 runner-ups) ===
Result	W/L	Date	Tournament	Surface	Partner	Opponents	Score
Win	1–0	Jun 1985	Bologna, Italy	Clay	(Italy) Simone Colombo	(Spain) Jordi Arrese (Spain) Alberto Tous	7–5, 6–4
Loss	1–1	Aug 1985	Kitzbühel, Austria	Clay	(Italy) Claudio Panatta	(Spain) Sergio Casal (Spain) Emilio Sánchez	3–6, 6–3, 2–6
Win	2–1	Jun 1986	Bologna, Italy	Clay	(Italy) Simone Colombo	(Italy) Claudio Panatta (United States) Blaine Willenborg	6–1, 6–2
Win	3–1	Oct 1986	Palermo, Italy	Clay	(Italy) Simone Colombo	(Switzerland) Claudio Mezzadri (Italy) Gianni Ocleppo	7–5, 6–3
Loss	3–2	May 1987	Florence, Italy	Clay	(Italy) Gianni Ocleppo	(West Germany) Wolfgang Popp (West Germany) Udo Riglewski	4–6, 3–6
Loss	3–3	Aug 1988	St. Vincent, Italy	Clay	(Hungary) Balázs Taróczy	(Argentina) Alberto Mancini (Argentina) Christian Miniussi	4–6, 7–5, 3–6
Loss	3–4	Apr 1989	Monte Carlo, Monaco	Clay	(Italy) Diego Nargiso	(Czechoslovakia) Tomáš Šmíd (Australia) Mark Woodforde	6–1, 4–6, 2–6
Loss	3–5	Apr 1990	Estoril, Portugal	Clay	(Italy) Omar Camporese	(Spain) Sergio Casal (Spain) Emilio Sánchez	5–7, 6–4, 5–7
