= Simone Colombo =

Italian tennis player

- Country (sports): Italy
- Born: 23 August 1963 (age 63) Milan, Italy
- Height: 1.80 m (5 ft 11 in)
- Plays: Right-handed
- Prize money: $289,230

Singles
- Career record: 35–54
- Career titles: 1
- Highest ranking: No. 60 (17 November 1986)

Grand Slam singles results
- French Open: 1R (1987
- Wimbledon: 1R (1984, 1987)
- US Open: 2R (1984)

Doubles
- Career record: 70–75
- Career titles: 5
- Highest ranking: No. 68 (11 September 1989)

Grand Slam doubles results
- French Open: 2R (1986)
- Wimbledon: 1R (1984, 1987, 1990)
- US Open: 1R (1984, 1987)

Simone Colombo (born 28 August 1963) is a former professional tennis player from Italy.

During his career, Colombo won five doubles titles and one singles title. He achieved a career-high doubles ranking of World No. 68 in 1989, and a career-high singles ranking of World No. 60 in 1986.

Colombo participated in 3 Davis Cup ties for Italy from 1987 to 1988, posting a 1–2 record in doubles and an 0–2 record in singles.

== Career finals ==
=== Singles (1 title) ===
Result	W-L	Date	Tournament	Surface	Opponent	Score
Win	1–0	Aug 1986	Saint Vincent, Italy	Clay	(Australia) Paul McNamee	2–6, 6–3, 7–6

=== Doubles (5 titles, 1 runner-up) ===
Result	W-L	Date	Tournament	Surface	Partner	Opponents	Score
Win	1–0	Jun 1985	Bologna, Italy	Clay	(Italy) Paolo Canè	(Spain) Jordi Arrese (Spain) Alberto Tous	7–5, 6–4
Win	2–0	Jun 1986	Bologna, Italy	Clay	(Italy) Paolo Canè	(Italy) Claudio Panatta (United States) Blaine Willenborg	6–1, 6–2
Win	3–0	Oct 1986	Palermo, Italy	Clay	(Italy) Paolo Canè	(Switzerland) Claudio Mezzadri (Italy) Gianni Ocleppo	7–5, 6–3
Loss	3–1	Sep 1988	Bari, Italy	Clay	(Italy) Francesco Cancellotti	(Austria) Thomas Muster (Italy) Claudio Panatta	3–6, 1–6
Win	4–2	Jun 1989	Bari, Italy	Clay	(Switzerland) Claudio Mezzadri	(Spain) Sergio Casal (Spain) Javier Sánchez	0–6, 6–3, 6–3
Win	5–2	Aug 1989	San Marino	Clay	(Switzerland) Claudio Mezzadri	(Argentina) Pablo Albano (Argentina) Gustavo Luza	6–4, 6–1
