= Claudio Panatta =

Italian tennis player, active 1979–1989

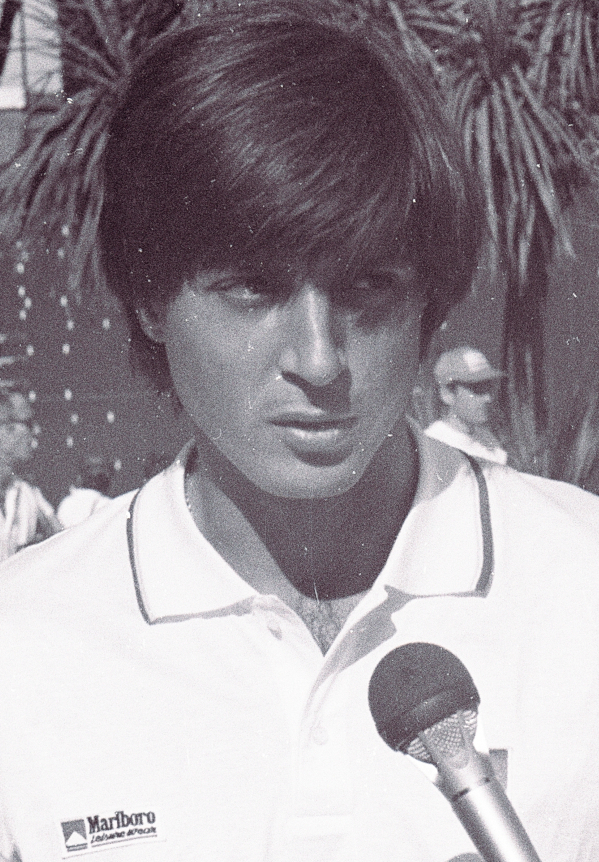
- Country (sports): Italy
- Born: 2 February 1960 (age 66) Rome, Italy
- Height: 1.78 m (5 ft 10 in)
- Turned pro: 1979
- Retired: 1989
- Plays: Right-handed
- Prize money: $455,711

Singles
- Career record: 105–143
- Career titles: 1
- Highest ranking: No. 46 (18 June 1984)

Grand Slam singles results
- French Open: 3R (1984, 1986)
- Wimbledon: 2R (1982, 1983, 1987)
- US Open: 2R (1982, 1985)

Doubles
- Career record: 115–135
- Career titles: 6
- Highest ranking: No. 45 (26 September 1988)

Grand Slam doubles results
- French Open: 2R (1985, 1988)
- Wimbledon: 1R (1983, 1984, 1985)
- US Open: 2R (1982)

Claudio Panatta (born 2 February 1960) is an Italian former tennis player and younger brother of 1976 French Open champion Adriano Panatta.

Panatta won 6 doubles titles and 1 singles title during his professional career. The right-hander reached his highest singles ATP ranking on 18 June 1984, when he became the number 46 in the world.

Panatta participated in eight Davis Cup ties for Italy from 1983 to 1987, posting a 5–8 record in singles and a 2–4 record in doubles.

During his career he beat Jimmy Arias, José Luis Clerc, Andre Agassi, Johan Kriek, José Higueras, Kim Warwick, Victor Pecci, Guillermo Pérez Roldán, Emilio Sánchez, Adriano Panatta, Corrado Barazzutti, Antonio Zugarelli, Francesco Cancellotti, and Paolo Canè.

== Career ATP finals ==
=== Singles: 4 (1 titles / 3 runner-ups) ===
Result	W/L	Date	Tournament	Surface	Opponent	Score
Loss	0–1	Feb 1982	Cairo, Egypt	Clay	(Australia) Brad Drewett	3–6, 3–6
Win	1–1	Apr 1985	Bari, Italy	Clay	(United States) Lawson Duncan	6–2, 1–6, 7–6
Loss	1–2	Jun 1985	Bologna, Italy	Clay	(France) Thierry Tulasne	2–6, 0–6
Loss	1–3	May 1988	Florence, Italy	Clay	(Italy) Massimiliano Narducci	6–3, 1–6, 1–6

=== Doubles: 12 (6 titles / 6 runner-ups) ===
Result	W/L	Date	Tournament	Surface	Partner	Opponents	Score
Win	1–0	Apr 1985	Nice, France	Clay	(Czechoslovakia) Pavel Složil	(France) Loïc Courteau (France) Guy Forget	3–6, 6–3, 8–6
Win	2–0	Apr 1985	Bari, Italy	Clay	(Argentina) Alejandro Ganzábal	(United States) Marcel Freeman (Australia) Laurie Warder	6–4, 6–2
Loss	2–1	Aug 1985	Kitzbühel, Austria	Clay	(Italy) Paolo Canè	(Spain) Sergio Casal (Spain) Emilio Sánchez	3–6, 6–3, 2–6
Loss	2–2	Jun 1986	Bologna, Italy	Clay	(United States) Blaine Willenborg	(Italy) Paolo Canè (Italy) Simone Colombo	1–6, 2–6
Loss	2–3	Jun 1986	Athens, Greece	Clay	(Peru) Carlos di Laura	(Czechoslovakia) Libor Pimek (United States) Blaine Willenborg	7–5, 4–6, 2–6
Loss	2–4	Sep 1986	Barcelona, Spain	Clay	(Peru) Carlos di Laura	(Sweden) Jan Gunnarsson (Sweden) Joakim Nyström	3–6, 4–6
Loss	2–5	Jun 1987	Bologna, Italy	Clay	(United States) Blaine Willenborg	(Spain) Sergio Casal (Spain) Emilio Sánchez	3–6, 2–6
Win	3–5	Oct 1987	Palermo, Italy	Clay	(Mexico) Leonardo Lavalle	(Czechoslovakia) Petr Korda (Czechoslovakia) Tomáš Šmíd	3–6, 6–4, 6–4
Win	4–5	Jul 1988	Bordeaux, France	Clay	(Sweden) Joakim Nyström	(Argentina) Christian Miniussi (Italy) Diego Nargiso	6–1, 6–4
Loss	4–6	Aug 1988	Kitzbühel, Austria	Clay	(Sweden) Joakim Nyström	(Spain) Sergio Casal (Spain) Emilio Sánchez	4–6, 6–7
Win	5–6	Sep 1988	Bari, Italy	Clay	(Austria) Thomas Muster	(Italy) Francesco Cancellotti (Italy) Simone Colombo	6–3, 6–1
Win	6–6	Apr 1989	Athens, Greece	Clay	(Czechoslovakia) Tomáš Šmíd	(Argentina) Gustavo Giussani (Argentina) Gerardo Mirad	6–3, 6–2
