= 1988 WCT Tournament of Champions – Doubles =

Doubles
- 1988 WCT Tournament of Champions

Final
- Champions: (Mexico) Jorge Lozano (United States) Todd Witsken
- Runners-up: (South Africa) Pieter Aldrich (South Africa) Danie Visser
- Score: 6–3, 7–6

Events
Singles	Doubles
← 1987 ·	WCT Tournament of Champions	· 1989 →

Guy Forget and Yannick Noah were the defending champions, but none competed this year.

Jorge Lozano and Todd Witsken won the title, by defeating Pieter Aldrich and Danie Visser 6–3, 7–6 in the final.

== Seeds ==
1. (United States) Ken Flach / (United States) Robert Seguso (quarterfinals)
2. (United States) Paul Annacone / (South Africa) Christo van Rensburg (second round)
3. (United States) Gary Donnelly / (United States) Peter Fleming (first round)
4. (United States) Scott Davis / (United States) Blaine Willenborg (first round)
5. (Mexico) Jorge Lozano / (United States) Todd Witsken (champions)
6. (Chile) Hans Gildemeister / (Ecuador) Andrés Gómez (first round)
7. (United States) Andy Kohlberg / (United States) Robert Van't Hof (first round)
8. (United States) Steve Denton / (United States) Sammy Giammalva Jr. (quarterfinals)

== Draw ==
=== Key ===
- Q = Qualifier
- WC = Wild card
- LL = Lucky loser
- Alt = Alternate
- SE = Special exempt
- PR = Protected ranking
- ITF = ITF entry
- JE = Junior exempt
- w/o = Walkover
- r = Retired
- d = Defaulted
- SR = Special ranking

=== Finals ===
Semifinals
(South Africa) Pieter Aldrich (South Africa) Danie Visser	6	7
(Sweden) Mikael Pernfors (Sweden) Tobias Svantesson	3	5
5	(Mexico) Jorge Lozano (United States) Todd Witsken	6	3	6
(United States) David Dowlen (United States) Marcel Freeman	4	6	4

Final
(South Africa) Pieter Aldrich (South Africa) Danie Visser	3	6
5	(Mexico) Jorge Lozano (United States) Todd Witsken	6	7

=== Top half ===
First round
1	(United States) K Flach (United States) R Seguso	6	6
WC	(United States) M Chang (United States) P Sampras	4	3
(United States) M Davis (United States) T Pawsat	3	6	6
(Israel) G Bloom (West Germany) P Kühnen	6	3	3
(South Africa) E Edwards (South Africa) G Muller	2	0
(South Africa) P Aldrich (South Africa) D Visser	6	6
(United States) J Rive (United States) L Shiras	6	7	7
7	(United States) A Kohlberg (United States) R Van't Hof	7	5	6
4	(United States) S Davis (United States) B Willenborg	3	4
(United States) M Flur (United States) T Siegel	6	6
(Australia) D Macpherson (Australia) S Youl	6	3
(United States) P Chamberlin (United States) L Scott	7	6
WC	(United States) B Cox (United States) L Duncan	3	4
(United States) S Stewart (Australia) K Warwick	6	6
(Sweden) M Pernfors (Sweden) T Svantesson	7	6
6	(Chile) H Gildemeister (Ecuador) A Gómez	6	2

Second round
1	(United States) K Flach (United States) R Seguso	6	6
(United States) M Davis (United States) T Pawsat	3	2
(South Africa) P Aldrich (South Africa) D Visser	7	6	7
(United States) J Rive (United States) L Shiras	6	7	6
(United States) M Flur (United States) T Siegel	3	6	7
(United States) P Chamberlin (United States) L Scott	6	3	6
(United States) S Stewart (Australia) K Warwick	4	2
(Sweden) M Pernfors (Sweden) T Svantesson	6	6

Quarterfinals
1	(United States) K Flach (United States) R Seguso	2	6	3
(South Africa) P Aldrich (South Africa) D Visser	6	3	6
(United States) M Flur (United States) T Siegel	6	1
(Sweden) M Pernfors (Sweden) T Svantesson	7	6

Semifinals
(South Africa) P Aldrich (South Africa) D Visser	6	7
(Sweden) M Pernfors (Sweden) T Svantesson	3	5

=== Bottom half ===
First round
5	(Mexico) J Lozano (United States) T Witsken	7	6
(United States) M Dickson (South Africa) B Levine	6	5
(United States) J Arias (United States) E Teltscher	7	7
(New Zealand) B Derlin (Paraguay) F González	6	5
(Peru) C di Laura (Argentina) J Frana	7	5	7
(United States) G Layendecker (United States) P Palandjian	5	7	5
(United States) E Korita (United States) J Levine	7	5	7
3	(United States) G Donnelly (United States) P Fleming	5	7	6
8	(United States) S Denton (United States) S Giammalva Jr.	2	6	6
WC	(United States) A Agassi (United States) A Krickstein	6	4	3
(United States) D Cassidy (United States) M Purcell	6	6
Alt	(South Africa) C Campbell (United States) R Reneberg	7	7
(United States) C Hooper (United States) T Nelson	4	7	4
(United States) D Dowlen (United States) M Freeman	6	6	6
(United States) R Baxter (United States) J Ross	2	6
2	(United States) P Annacone (South Africa) C van Rensburg	6	7

Second round
5	(Mexico) J Lozano (United States) T Witsken	6	6	6
(United States) J Arias (United States) E Teltscher	7	4	4
(Peru) C di Laura (Argentina) J Frana	3	4
(United States) E Korita (United States) J Levine	6	6
8	(United States) S Denton (United States) S Giammalva Jr.	w	/	o
Alt	(South Africa) C Campbell (United States) R Reneberg
(United States) D Dowlen (United States) M Freeman	6	6
2	(United States) P Annacone (South Africa) C van Rensburg	3	2

Quarterfinals
5	(Mexico) J Lozano (United States) T Witsken	7	7
(United States) E Korita (United States) J Levine	6	6
8	(United States) S Denton (United States) S Giammalva Jr.	6	2
(United States) D Dowlen (United States) M Freeman	7	6

Semifinals
5	(Mexico) J Lozano (United States) T Witsken	6	3	6
(United States) D Dowlen (United States) M Freeman	4	6	4
