= 1990 Grand Prix Passing Shot – Singles =

Singles
- 1990 Grand Prix Passing Shot

Final
- Champion: (France) Guy Forget
- Runner-up: (Socialist Federal Republic of Yugoslavia) Goran Ivanišević
- Score: 6–4, 6–3

Details
- Draw: 32 (3WC/4Q)
- Seeds: 8

Events
Singles	Doubles
← 1989 ·	ATP Bordeaux	· 1991 →

Ivan Lendl was the defending champion, but did not compete this year.

Guy Forget won the title by defeating Goran Ivanišević 6–4, 6–3 in the final.

== Seeds ==
1. (Austria) Thomas Muster (second round)
2. (Socialist Federal Republic of Yugoslavia) Goran Ivanišević (final)
3. (Argentina) Guillermo Pérez Roldán (semifinals)
4. (France) Guy Forget (champion)
5. (Spain) Juan Aguilera (first round)
6. (Spain) Jordi Arrese (first round)
7. (France) Yannick Noah (second round)
8. (Haiti) Ronald Agénor (semifinals)

== Draw ==
=== Key ===
- Q = Qualifier
- WC = Wild card
- LL = Lucky loser
- Alt = Alternate
- ITF = ITF entry
- PR = Protected ranking
- SR = Special ranking
- SE = Special exempt
- JE = Junior exempt
- JR = Junior Accelerator Programme entrant
- CO = College Accelerator Programme entrant
- NG = Next Gen Accelerator Program entrant
- w/o = Walkover
- r = Retired
- d = Defaulted

=== Finals ===
Semifinals
8	(Haiti) Ronald Agénor	3	4
4	(France) Guy Forget	6	6
3	(Argentina) Guillermo Pérez Roldán	4	4
2/WC	(Socialist Federal Republic of Yugoslavia) Goran Ivanišević	6	6

Final
4	(France) Guy Forget	6	6
2/WC	(Socialist Federal Republic of Yugoslavia) Goran Ivanišević	4	3

=== Top half ===
First round
1	(Austria) T Muster	6	6
(Netherlands) T Nijssen	2	2
Q	(Sweden) T Nydahl	3	7	6
(Italy) C Pistolesi	6	6	4
(Belgium) E Masso	2	1
(France) T Benhabiles	6	6
WC	(France) A Boetsch	4	5
8	(Haiti) R Agénor	6	7
4	(France) G Forget	7	3	6
(France) JP Fleurian	5	6	2
(Spain) C Costa	6	7
(Germany) J Wöhrmann	3	5
(United States) L Duncan	6	3
(France) C Pioline	3	2^{r}
Q	(Argentina) M Ingaramo	6	6	6
6	(Spain) J Arrese	7	2	4

Second round
1	(Austria) T Muster	6	4	4
Q	(Sweden) T Nydahl	2	6	6
(France) T Benhabiles	6	3	2
8	(Haiti) R Agénor	4	6	6
4	(France) G Forget	6	3	6
(Spain) C Costa	4	6	4
(United States) L Duncan	6	6
Q	(Argentina) M Ingaramo	3	2

Quarterfinals
Q	(Sweden) T Nydahl	0	1
8	(Haiti) R Agénor	6	6
4	(France) G Forget	6	6	6
(United States) L Duncan	1	7	0

Semifinals
8	(Haiti) R Agénor	3	4
4	(France) G Forget	6	6

=== Bottom half ===
First round
5	(Spain) J Aguilera	2	7	6
(France) T Champion	6	5	7
(Spain) JF Altur	7	6
(France) J Potier	6	2
(Spain) T Carbonell	6	6
(Belgium) B Wuyts	1	1
WC	(Iran) M Bahrami	6	2
3	(Argentina) G Pérez Roldán	7	6
7	(France) Y Noah	6	6
(France) T Tulasne	4	2
(United States) J Brown	1	2
(France) F Santoro	6	6
Q	(Spain) J Burillo	3	6	3
(Spain) F Luna	6	3	6
Q	(Spain) JL Aparisi	7	1	3
2/WC	(Socialist Federal Republic of Yugoslavia) G Ivanišević	6	6	6

Second round
(France) T Champion	5
(Spain) JF Altur	1^{r}
(Spain) T Carbonell	6	4	2
3	(Argentina) G Pérez Roldán	4	6	6
7	(France) Y Noah	2	6
(France) F Santoro	6	7
(Spain) F Luna	6	6	0
2/WC	(Socialist Federal Republic of Yugoslavia) G Ivanišević	3	7	6

Quarterfinals
(France) T Champion	6	2	1
3	(Argentina) G Pérez Roldán	4	6	6
(France) F Santoro	2	3
2/WC	(Socialist Federal Republic of Yugoslavia) G Ivanišević	6	6

Semifinals
3	(Argentina) G Pérez Roldán	4	4
2/WC	(Socialist Federal Republic of Yugoslavia) G Ivanišević	6	6
