= 1986 WCT Tournament of Champions – Doubles =

Doubles
- 1986 WCT Tournament of Champions

Final
- Champions: (Chile) Hans Gildemeister (Ecuador) Andrés Gómez
- Runners-up: (West Germany) Boris Becker (Socialist Federal Republic of Yugoslavia) Slobodan Živojinović
- Score: 7–6, 7–6

Details
- Draw: 32
- Seeds: 8

Events
Singles	Doubles
← 1985 ·	WCT Tournament of Champions	· 1987 →

Ken Flach and Robert Seguso were the defending champions, but lost in the semifinals to Hans Gildemeister and Andrés Gómez.

Gildemeister and Gómez won the title by defeating Boris Becker and Slobodan Živojinović 7–6, 7–6 in the final.

== Seeds ==
1. (United States) Ken Flach / (United States) Robert Seguso (semifinals)
2. (West Germany) Boris Becker / (Socialist Federal Republic of Yugoslavia) Slobodan Živojinović (final)
3. (Chile) Hans Gildemeister / (Ecuador) Andrés Gómez (champions)
4. (United States) Gary Donnelly / (United States) Peter Fleming (quarterfinals)
5. (South Africa) Christo van Rensburg / (United States) Tim Wilkison (second round)
6. (France) Yannick Noah / (United States) Sherwood Stewart (quarterfinals)
7. (United States) Andy Kohlberg / (United States) Robert Van't Hof (second round)
8. (Australia) Peter Doohan / (Australia) Paul McNamee (second round)

== Draw ==
=== Key ===
- Q = Qualifier
- WC = Wild card
- LL = Lucky loser
- Alt = Alternate
- SE = Special exempt
- PR = Protected ranking
- ITF = ITF entry
- JE = Junior exempt
- w/o = Walkover
- r = Retired
- d = Defaulted
- SR = Special ranking

=== Finals ===
Semifinals
1	(United States) Ken Flach (United States) Robert Seguso	6	4
3	(Chile) Hans Gildemeister (Ecuador) Andrés Gómez	7	6
(Sweden) Jan Gunnarsson (Sweden) Joakim Nyström	5	7	4
2	(West Germany) Boris Becker (Socialist Federal Republic of Yugoslavia) Slobodan Živojinović	7	6	6

Final
3	(Chile) Hans Gildemeister (Ecuador) Andrés Gómez	7	7
2	(West Germany) Boris Becker (Socialist Federal Republic of Yugoslavia) Slobodan Živojinović	6	6

=== Top half ===
First round
1	(United States) K Flach (United States) R Seguso	6	6
(United States) R Rudeen (United States) E Van't Hof	4	2
(Switzerland) J Hlasek (Czechoslovakia) P Složil	6	6
(United States) T Delatte (United States) L Stefanki	3	4
(United States) D Dowlen (United States) B Schultz	5	6
(South Africa) M Robertson (United States) T Warneke	7	7
(South Africa) E Edwards (Paraguay) F González	2	0
8	(Australia) P Doohan (Australia) P McNamee	6	6
3	(Chile) H Gildemeister (Ecuador) A Gómez	6	4	7
(United States) S Meister (United States) C Wittus	4	6	5
(Chile) R Acuña (Canada) C Michibata	2	3
(United States) M Davis (United States) C Dunk	6	6
(United States) M Bauer (Italy) C Panatta	5	4
(United States) J Arias (United States) A Krickstein	7	6
(Mexico) L Lavalle (United Kingdom) J Lloyd	6	2
6	(France) Y Noah (United States) S Stewart	7	6

Second round
1	(United States) K Flach (United States) R Seguso	6	6
(Switzerland) J Hlasek (Czechoslovakia) P Složil	4	3
(South Africa) M Robertson (United States) T Warneke	6	6	6
8	(Australia) P Doohan (Australia) P McNamee	7	4	3
3	(Chile) H Gildemeister (Ecuador) A Gómez	6	4	7
(United States) M Davis (United States) C Dunk	3	6	5
(United States) J Arias (United States) A Krickstein	3	6	3
6	(France) Y Noah (United States) S Stewart	6	4	6

Quarterfinals
1	(United States) K Flach (United States) R Seguso	3	6	6
(South Africa) M Robertson (United States) T Warneke	6	2	4
3	(Chile) H Gildemeister (Ecuador) A Gómez	6	6	7
6	(France) Y Noah (United States) S Stewart	7	3	5

Semifinals
1	(United States) K Flach (United States) R Seguso	6	4
3	(Chile) H Gildemeister (Ecuador) A Gómez	7	6

=== Bottom half ===
First round
5	(South Africa) C van Rensburg (United States) T Wilkison	7	6
(South Africa) C Steyn (South Africa) D Visser	6	3
(Switzerland) S Medem (United States) C Strode	4	4
(Sweden) J Gunnarsson (Sweden) J Nystróm	6	6
(United States) K Curren (United States) S Denton	6	7
(Brazil) D Campos (Brazil) C Kirmayr	4	5
(New Zealand) K Evernden (Australia) D Graham	2	0
4	(United States) G Donnelly (United States) P Fleming	6	6
7	(United States) A Kohlberg (United States) R Van't Hof	6	6
(Poland) W Fibak (United States) M Mitchell	2	3
(United States) B Gilbert (United States) B Teacher	7	6
(Australia) P Cash (Australia) C Fancutt	6	4
(Argentina) A Ganzábal (France) T Tulasne	6	2	1
(United States) S Giammalva Jr. (United States) B Willenborg	3	6	6
(United States) B Cox (Australia) M Fancutt	5	3
2	(West Germany) B Becker (Socialist Federal Republic of Yugoslavia) S Živojinović	7	6

Second round
5	(South Africa) C van Rensburg (United States) T Wilkison	3	6	3
(Sweden) J Gunnarsson (Sweden) J Nystróm	6	3	6
(United States) K Curren (United States) S Denton	4	4
4	(United States) G Donnelly (United States) P Fleming	6	6
7	(United States) A Kohlberg (United States) R Van't Hof	4	5
(United States) B Gilbert (United States) B Teacher	6	7
(United States) S Giammalva Jr. (United States) B Willenborg	3	5
2	(West Germany) B Becker (Socialist Federal Republic of Yugoslavia) S Živojinović	6	7

Quarterfinals
(Sweden) J Gunnarsson (Sweden) J Nystróm	6	7	6
4	(United States) G Donnelly (United States) P Fleming	7	6	1
(United States) B Gilbert (United States) B Teacher	2	2
2	(West Germany) B Becker (Socialist Federal Republic of Yugoslavia) S Živojinović	6	6

Semifinals
(Sweden) J Gunnarsson (Sweden) J Nystróm	5	7	4
2	(West Germany) B Becker (Socialist Federal Republic of Yugoslavia) S Živojinović	7	6	6
