= 1987 WCT Tournament of Champions – Singles =

Singles
- 1987 WCT Tournament of Champions

Final
- Champion: (Ecuador) Andrés Gómez
- Runner-up: (France) Yannick Noah
- Score: 6–4, 7–6^{(7–5)}, 7–6^{(7–1)}

Details
- Draw: 64 (3WC/8Q/2LL)
- Seeds: 16

Events
Singles	Doubles
← 1986 ·	WCT Tournament of Champions	· 1988 →

Yannick Noah was the defending champion, but lost in the final to Andrés Gómez. The score was 6–4, 7–6^{(7–5)}, 7–6^{(7–1)}.

== Seeds ==
1. (West Germany) Boris Becker (semifinals)
2. (France) Yannick Noah (final)
3. (United States) Tim Mayotte (first round)
4. (Ecuador) Andrés Gómez (champion)
5. (Australia) Pat Cash (second round)
6. (Argentina) Martín Jaite (quarterfinals)
7. (Argentina) Guillermo Vilas (quarterfinals)
8. (Switzerland) Jakob Hlasek (third round)
9. (United States) Jimmy Arias (second round)
10. (United States) Aaron Krickstein (quarterfinals)
11. (United States) Jay Berger (third round)
12. (Socialist Federal Republic of Yugoslavia) Slobodan Živojinović (semifinals)
13. (United States) Eliot Teltscher (second round)
14. (South Africa) Christo van Rensburg (first round)
15. (France) Guy Forget (third round)
16. (Argentina) Horacio de la Peña (third round)

== Draw ==
Key

- Q = Qualifier
- WC = Wild card
- LL = Lucky loser
- Alt = Alternate
- ITF = ITF entry
- PR = Protected ranking
- SR = Special ranking
- SE = Special exempt
- JE = Junior exempt
- JR = Junior Accelerator Programme entrant
- CO = College Accelerator Programme entrant
- NG = Next Gen Accelerator Program entrant
- w/o = Walkover
- r = Retired
- d = Defaulted

=== Finals ===
Quarterfinals
1	(West Germany) Boris Becker	7	6
7	(Argentina) Guillermo Vilas	6	2
4	(Ecuador) Andrés Gómez	6	3	6
6	(Argentina) Martín Jaite	4	6	4
12	(Socialist Federal Republic of Yugoslavia) Slobodan Živojinović	5	7	6
(United States) Paul Annacone	7	5	4
10	(United States) Aaron Krickstein	2	2
2	(France) Yannick Noah	6	6

Semifinals
1	(West Germany) Boris Becker	6	4	3
4	(Ecuador) Andrés Gómez	4	6	6
12	(Socialist Federal Republic of Yugoslavia) Slobodan Živojinović	3	5
2	(France) Yannick Noah	6	7

Final
4	(Ecuador) Andrés Gómez	6	7^{7}	7^{7}
2	(France) Yannick Noah	4	6^{5}	6^{1}

=== Top half ===
==== Section 1 ====
First round
1	(West Germany) B Becker	2
(Mexico) F Maciel	2^{r}
(Spain) J Avendaño	6	6
(United States) B Scanlon	1	2
Q	(United States) T Warneke	3	6	6
Q	(Chile) R Acuña	6	1	4
(Socialist Federal Republic of Yugoslavia) M Ostoja	0	3
16	(Argentina) H de la Peña	6	6
9	(United States) J Arias	6	6
(United States) J Lapidus	4	2
(Brazil) J Góes	2	6	3
(United States) M Davis	6	4	6
WC	(United States) M Blackman	4	2
Q	(United States) E Fromm	6	6
(South Africa) E Edwards	2	7	3
7	(Argentina) G Vilas	6	6	6

Second round
1	(West Germany) B Becker	7	5	6
(Spain) J Avendaño	6	7	2
Q	(United States) T Warneke	4	2
16	(Argentina) H de la Peña	6	6
9	(United States) J Arias	6	4
(United States) M Davis	7	6
Q	(United States) E Fromm	2	1
7	(Argentina) G Vilas	6	6

Third round
1	(West Germany) B Becker	6	7
16	(Argentina) H de la Peña	4	6
(United States) M Davis	5	6
7	(Argentina) G Vilas	7	7

Quarterfinals
1	(West Germany) B Becker	7	6
7	(Argentina) G Vilas	6	2

==== Section 2 ====
First round
4	(Ecuador) A Gómez	6	6
Q	(Brazil) N Aerts	4	3
(Poland) W Fibak	7	1	1
(Argentina) E Bengoechea	6	6	6
(South Africa) B Moir	6	4	6
(United States) P Fleming	2	6	4
(Italy) C Panatta	2	6	2
13	(United States) E Teltscher	6	3	6
11	(United States) J Berger	6	7
Q	(United States) A Parker	4	5
(United States) S Giammalva Jr.	6	6
(United States) M Buckley	3	4
(Socialist Federal Republic of Yugoslavia) B Orešar	6	6
(South Africa) D Visser	4	4
Q	(United States) L Shiras	4	4
6	(Argentina) M Jaite	6	6

Second round
4	(Ecuador) A Gómez	6	6
(Argentina) E Bengoechea	2	4
(South Africa) B Moir	2	6	6
13	(United States) E Teltscher	6	3	1
11	(United States) J Berger	6	7
(United States) S Giammalva Jr.	4	6
(Socialist Federal Republic of Yugoslavia) B Orešar	4	4
6	(Argentina) M Jaite	6	6

Third round
4	(Ecuador) A Gómez	6	6
(South Africa) B Moir	3	4
11	(United States) J Berger	3	3
6	(Argentina) M Jaite	6	6

Quarterfinals
4	(Ecuador) A Gómez	6	3	6
6	(Argentina) M Jaite	4	6	4

=== Bottom half ===
==== Section 3 ====
First round
5	(Australia) P Cash	6	6	7
LL	(United States) B Dickinson	7	4	5
(India) V Amritraj	0	1
Q	(Canada) M Wostenholme	6	6
(Sweden) T Högstedt	7	3	6
Q	(United States) B Banck	6	6	7
(United States) M Dickson	6	6	5
12	(Socialist Federal Republic of Yugoslavia) S Živojinović	7	4	7
14	(South Africa) C van Rensburg	5	4
(West Germany) A Maurer	7	6
LL	(United States) D Tarr	3	0
(United States) M Freeman	6	6
(United States) M Anger	2	2
(United States) P Annacone	6	6
(West Germany) P Vojtíšek	5	7	6
3	(United States) T Mayotte	7	6	2

Second round
5	(Australia) P Cash	2	4
Q	(Canada) M Wostenholme	6	6
Q	(United States) B Banck	2	1
12	(Socialist Federal Republic of Yugoslavia) S Živojinović	6	6
(West Germany) A Maurer	6	4	6
(United States) M Freeman	2	6	4
(United States) P Annacone	6	6
(West Germany) P Vojtíšek	4	3

Third round
Q	(Canada) M Wostenholme	3	0
12	(Socialist Federal Republic of Yugoslavia) S Živojinović	6	6
(West Germany) A Maurer	4	4
(United States) P Annacone	6	6

Quarterfinals
12	(Socialist Federal Republic of Yugoslavia) S Živojinović	5	7	6
(United States) P Annacone	7	5	4

==== Section 4 ====
First round
8	(Switzerland) J Hlasek	7	0
WC	(United States) L Duncan	5	1^{r}
(Czechoslovakia) K Nováček	4	6	4
(United States) J Sadri	6	4	6
(Spain) A Tous	6	6
(United States) G Donnelly	1	2
(United States) G Layendecker	3	2
10	(United States) A Kricistein	6	6
15	(France) G Forget	6	6	6
(Argentina) R Argüello	7	1	3
(United States) D Rostagno	3	7	6
(West Germany) M Westphal	6	5	2
WC	(United States) L Scott	6	3	6
(West Germany) D Keretić	3	6	7
(Peru) J Yzaga	5	2
2	(France) Y Noah	7	6

Second round
8	(Switzerland) J Hlasek	7	6
(United States) J Sadri	5	4
(Spain) A Tous	4	3
10	(United States) A Kricistein	6	6
15	(France) G Forget	4	6	7
(United States) D Rostagno	6	1	6
(West Germany) D Keretić	1	2
2	(France) Y Noah	6	6

Third round
8	(Switzerland) J Hlasek	3	4
10	(United States) A Kricistein	6	6
15	(France) G Forget	1	1
2	(France) Y Noah	6	6

Quarterfinals
10	(United States) A Kricistein	2	2
2	(France) Y Noah	6	6
