= 1986 WCT Tournament of Champions – Singles =

Singles
- 1986 WCT Tournament of Champions

Final
- Champion: (France) Yannick Noah
- Runner-up: (Argentina) Guillermo Vilas
- Score: 7–6^{(7–3)}, 6–0

Details
- Draw: 64 (5WC/8Q)
- Seeds: 16

Events
Singles	Doubles
← 1985 ·	WCT Tournament of Champions	· 1987 →

Ivan Lendl was the defending champion, but lost in the semifinals to Yannick Noah.

Noah won the title by defeating Guillermo Vilas 7–6^{(7–3)}, 6–0 in the final.

== Seeds ==
1. (Czechoslovakia) Ivan Lendl (semifinals)
2. (West Germany) Boris Becker (quarterfinals)
3. (Sweden) Joakim Nyström (quarterfinals)
4. (France) Yannick Noah (champion)
5. (United States) Kevin Curren (second round)
6. (United States) Brad Gilbert (second round)
7. (France) Thierry Tulasne (quarterfinals)
8. (Ecuador) Andrés Gómez (second round)
9. (Argentina) Martín Jaite (semifinals)
10. (United States) Jimmy Arias (second round)
11. (Sweden) Henrik Sundström (first round)
12. (West Germany) Andreas Maurer (second round)
13. (Socialist Federal Republic of Yugoslavia) Slobodan Živojinović (first round)
14. (United States) Tim Wilkison (thord round)
15. (Switzerland) Jakob Hlasek (second round)
16. (Sweden) Mikael Pernfors (second round)

== Draw ==
=== Key ===
- Q = Qualifier
- WC = Wild card
- LL = Lucky loser
- Alt = Alternate
- SE = Special exempt
- PR = Protected ranking
- ITF = ITF entry
- JE = Junior exempt
- w/o = Walkover
- r = Retired
- d = Defaulted
- SR = Special ranking

=== Finals ===
Quarterfinals
1/WC	(Czechoslovakia) Ivan Lendl	6	6
7	(France) Thierry Tulasne	4	2
4	(France) Yannick Noah	6	6
(Peru) Pablo Arraya	3	2
(Argentina) Guillermo Vilas	6	6	6
3/WC	(Sweden) Joakim Nyström	3	7	2
9	(Argentina) Martín Jaite	6	7
2	(West Germany) Boris Becker	2	6

Semifinals
1/WC	(Czechoslovakia) Ivan Lendl	3	5
4	(France) Yannick Noah	6	7
(Argentina) Guillermo Vilas	6	6
9	(Argentina) Martín Jaite	3	3

Final
4	(France) Yannick Noah	7	6
(Argentina) Guillermo Vilas	6	0

=== Top half ===
==== Section 1 ====
First round
1/WC	(Czechoslovakia) I Lendl	6	6
(Italy) F Cancellotti	3	4
Q	(United States) T Warneke	4	4
(United Kingdom) J Lloyd	6	6
(United States) A Krickstein	6	6
(Czechoslovakia) M Vajda	2	2
(United States) T Moor	3	3
16	(Sweden) M Pernfors	6	6
10	(United States) J Arias	6	3	6
(Czechoslovakia) P Složil	4	6	4
(Czechoslovakia) M Šrejber	6	3	6
(United States) J Brown	1	6	1
(Chile) R Acuña	6	2	6
(United States) J Canter	1	6	1
(West Germany) M Westphal	5	6
7	(France) T Tulasne	7	7

Second round
1/WC	(Czechoslovakia) I Lendl	6	6
(United Kingdom) J Lloyd	2	2
(United States) A Krickstein	6	4	6
16	(Sweden) M Pernfors	4	6	3
10	(United States) J Arias	6	4	2
(Czechoslovakia) M Šrejber	4	6	6
(Chile) R Acuña	2	4
7	(France) T Tulasne	6	6

Third round
1/WC	(Czechoslovakia) I Lendl	6	6
(United States) A Krickstein	2	4
(Czechoslovakia) M Šrejber	3	4
7	(France) T Tulasne	6	6

Quarterfinals
1/WC	(Czechoslovakia) I Lendl	6	6
7	(France) T Tulasne	4	2

==== Section 2 ====
First round
4	(France) Y Noah	6	6
(Sweden) J Gunnarsson	1	1
(Haiti) R Agénor	6	6
Q	(United States) E Fromm	2	1
(Australia) P McNamee	2	6	7
Q	(United States) M Purcell	6	2	5
(Mexico) F Maciel	6	5	7
13/WC	(Socialist Federal Republic of Yugoslavia) S Živojinović	4	7	6
11	(Sweden) H Sundström	6	6	6
(Peru) P Arraya	7	0	7
(United States) M Davis	6	6
(Brazil) C Kirmayr	3	3
(Uruguay) D Pérez	6	6
WC	(United States) K Flach	3	1
(United States) B Teacher	3	2
5	(United States) K Curren	6	6

Second round
4	(France) Y Noah	6	6	6
(Haiti) R Agénor	7	3	2
(Australia) P McNamee	6	6
(Mexico) F Maciel	0	2
(Peru) P Arraya	3	7	6
(United States) M Davis	6	5	3
(Uruguay) D Pérez	6	6
5	(United States) K Curren	2	2

Third round
4	(France) Y Noah	6	6
(Australia) P McNamee	0	3
(Peru) P Arraya	5	6	6
(Uruguay) D Pérez	7	2	1

Quarterfinals
4	(France) Y Noah	6	6
(Peru) P Arraya	3	2

=== Bottom half ===
==== Section 3 ====
First round
6	(United States) B Gilbert	7	6
WC	(United States) B Schultz	5	1
(West Germany) D Keretić	2	3
(Mexico) L Lavalle	6	6
(Argentina) G Vilas	6	5	6
(West Germany) H Schwaier	4	7	4
Q	(United States) N Schellenger	3	1
12	(West Germany) A Maurer	6	6
14	(United States) T Wilkison	6	6
(Argentina) R Argüello	2	1
(Nigeria) K Odizor	4	0
(United States) H Solomon	6	6
Q	(Brazil) D Campos	6	1	5
(United States) G Layendecker	3	6	7
Q	(United States) L Stefanki	2	2
3/WC	(Sweden) J Nystrom	6	6

Second round
6	(United States) B Gilbert	6	4	3
(Mexico) L Lavalle	1	6	6
(Argentina) G Vilas	6	6
12	(West Germany) A Maurer	2	4
14	(United States) T Wilkison	6	1	6
(United States) H Solomon	2	6	2
(United States) G Layendecker	1	4
3/WC	(Sweden) J Nystrom	6	6

Third round
(Mexico) L Lavalle	2	2
(Argentina) G Vilas	6	6
14	(United States) T Wilkison	3	7	2
3/WC	(Sweden) J Nystrom	6	6	6

Quarterfinals
(Argentina) G Vilas	6	6	6
3/WC	(Sweden) J Nystrom	3	7	2

==== Section 4 ====
First round
8	(Ecuador) A Gómez	6	7
(Italy) C Panatta	4	5
(Socialist Federal Republic of Yugoslavia) B Orešar	6	6
(Australia) P Doohan	2	4
(United States) S Giammalva Jr.	7	6
(Argentina) E Bengoechea	6	1
(Poland) W Fibak	4	3
9	(Argentina) M Jaite	6	6
15	(Switzerland) J Hlasek	6	6
(United States) J Sadri	3	3
(Argentina) H de la Peña	6	6
Q	(United States) B Blair	4	2
Q	(South Africa) C Campbell	6	2	1
(South Africa) E Edwards	2	6	6
(Spain) J Aguilera	2	4
2	(West Germany) B Becker	6	6

Second round
8	(Ecuador) A Gómez	5	4
(Socialist Federal Republic of Yugoslavia) B Orešar	7	6
(United States) S Giammalva Jr.	4	4
9	(Argentina) M Jaite	6	6
15	(Switzerland) J Hlasek	3	4
(Argentina) H de la Peña	6	6
(South Africa) E Edwards	4	1
2	(West Germany) B Becker	6	6

Third round
(Socialist Federal Republic of Yugoslavia) B Orešar	3	3
9	(Argentina) M Jaite	6	6
(Argentina) H de la Peña	5	5
2	(West Germany) B Becker	7	7

Quarterfinals
9	(Argentina) M Jaite	6	7
2	(West Germany) B Becker	2	6
