= 1992 Grand Prix Passing Shot – Doubles =

Doubles
- 1992 Grand Prix Passing Shot

Final
- Champions: (Spain) Sergio Casal (Spain) Emilio Sánchez
- Runners-up: (France) Arnaud Boetsch (France) Guy Forget
- Score: 6–1, 6–4

Events
Singles	Doubles
← 1991 ·	ATP Bordeaux	· 1993 →

Arnaud Boetsch and Guy Forget were the defending champions, but lost in the final to Sergio Casal and Emilio Sánchez. The score was 6–1, 6–4.

== Seeds ==
1. (Spain) Sergio Casal / (Spain) Emilio Sánchez (champions)
2. (Spain) Marcos Górriz / (United States) Mark Keil (first round)
3. (United States) Brian Devening / (Sweden) Per Henricsson (first round)
4. (France) Arnaud Boetsch / (France) Guy Forget (final)

== Draw ==
=== Key ===
- Q = Qualifier
- WC = Wild card
- LL = Lucky loser
- Alt = Alternate
- SE = Special exempt
- PR = Protected ranking
- ITF = ITF entry
- JE = Junior exempt
- w/o = Walkover
- r = Retired
- d = Defaulted
- SR = Special ranking

=== Draw ===
First round
1	(Spain) S Casal (Spain) E Sánchez	6	6
(Argentina) J Garat (Argentina) F Yunis	2	3
(Spain) À Corretja (Argentina) G Pérez Roldán	6	6
Q	(France) M Boyé (France) N Escudé	1	2
3	(United States) B Devening (Sweden) P Henricsson	4	7	3
(Belgium) X Daufresne (France) S Simian	6	6	6
(Spain) S Bruguera (Spain) C Costa	7	6
WC	(Haiti) R Agénor (France) L Prades	6	1
(Sweden) J Donar (Sweden) N Holm	3	6
(Australia) J Ireland (Australia) C Limberger	6	7
(Spain) J Arrese (Spain) F Roig	3	3
4	(France) A Boetsch (France) G Forget	6	6
(Sweden) B Borg (United Kingdom) J Lloyd	7	4	3
(France) G Bastié (Spain) J Burillo	6	6	6
(France) R Gilbert (Kenya) P Wekesa	6	6
2	(United States) M Keil (Spain) M Górriz	3	2

Quarterfinals
1	(Spain) S Casal (Spain) E Sánchez	6	6
(Spain) À Corretja (Argentina) G Pérez Roldán	4	1
(Belgium) X Daufresne (France) S Simian	6	7
(Spain) S Bruguera (Spain) C Costa	1	5
(Australia) J Ireland (Australia) C Limberger	3	4
4	(France) A Boetsch (France) G Forget	6	6
(France) G Bastié (Spain) J Burillo	7	7
(France) R Gilbert (Kenya) P Wekesa	5	5

Semifinals
1	(Spain) S Casal (Spain) E Sánchez	7	6
(Belgium) X Daufresne (France) S Simian	5	4
4	(France) A Boetsch (France) G Forget	7	6
(France) G Bastié (Spain) J Burillo	5	1

Final
1	(Spain) S Casal (Spain) E Sánchez	6	6
4	(France) A Boetsch (France) G Forget	1	4
