= 1992 Grand Prix Passing Shot – Singles =

Singles
- 1992 Grand Prix Passing Shot

Final
- Champion: (Commonwealth of Independent States) Andrei Medvedev
- Runner-up: (Spain) Sergi Bruguera
- Score: 6–3, 1–6, 6–2

Details
- Draw: 32 (3WC/4Q)
- Seeds: 8

Events
Singles	Doubles
← 1991 ·	ATP Bordeaux	· 1993 →

Guy Forget was the defending champion, but lost in the quarterfinals to Rodolphe Gilbert.

Andrei Medvedev won the title by defeating Sergi Bruguera 6–3, 1–6, 6–2 in the final.

== Seeds ==
1. (United States) Ivan Lendl (quarterfinals)
2. (Spain) Carlos Costa (quarterfinals)
3. (France) Guy Forget (quarterfinals)
4. (Spain) Sergi Bruguera (final)
5. (Spain) Emilio Sánchez (first round)
6. (Spain) Jordi Arrese (first round)
7. (Russia) Andrei Cherkasov (second round)
8. (France) Fabrice Santoro (second round)

== Draw ==
=== Key ===
- Q = Qualifier
- WC = Wild card
- LL = Lucky loser
- Alt = Alternate
- SE = Special exempt
- PR = Protected ranking
- ITF = ITF entry
- JE = Junior exempt
- w/o = Walkover
- r = Retired
- d = Defaulted
- SR = Special ranking

=== Finals ===
Semifinals
(France) Cédric Pioline	2	4
4	(Spain) Sergi Bruguera	6	6
(France) Rodolphe Gilbert	4	3
(Commonwealth of Independent States) Andrei Medvedev	6	6

Final
4	(Spain) Sergi Bruguera	3	6	2
(Commonwealth of Independent States) Andrei Medvedev	6	1	6

=== Top half ===
First round
1	(United States) I Lendl	6	6
(Australia) C Limberger	0	0
(Spain) À Corretja	6	6
(France) F Fontang	4	1
(Haiti) R Agénor	6	3	5
(France) C Pioline	2	6	7
Q	(Argentina) R Álvarez	2	6^{4}
8	(France) F Santoro	6	7^{7}
4	(Spain) S Bruguera	6	7
(Belgium) B Wuyts	3	5
Q	(France) T Van Den Daele	4	4
(Spain) M Górriz	6	6
WC	(Argentina) G Vilas	4	6	0
(Spain) G López	6	3	6
(Russia) A Chesnokov	6	7^{7}
5	(Spain) E Sánchez	2	6^{2}

Second round
1	(United States) I Lendl	6	6
(Spain) À Corretja	1	4
(France) C Pioline	6	6
8	(France) F Santoro	3	2
4	(Spain) S Bruguera	6^{4}	6	6
(Spain) M Górriz	7^{7}	2	0
(Spain) G López	6	6
(Russia) A Chesnokov	0	2

Quarterfinals
1	(United States) I Lendl	5	4
(France) C Pioline	7	6
4	(Spain) S Bruguera	6	6
(Spain) G López	4	2

Semifinals
(France) C Pioline	2	4
4	(Spain) S Bruguera	6	6

=== Bottom half ===
First round
6	(Spain) J Arrese	6^{6}	3
(France) R Gilbert	7^{8}	6
(Argentina) G Pérez Roldán	6	5	7^{7}
Q	(Argentina) J Garat	3	7	6^{3}
(Italy) C Pistolesi	7	6^{3}	6
(France) A Boetsch	5	7^{7}	3
(France) T Champion	3	6^{4}
3	(France) G Forget	6	7^{7}
7/WC	(Russia) A Cherkasov	6	7^{9}
Q	(France) L Prades	2	6^{7}
(Commonwealth of Independent States) A Medvedev	6	6
WC	(Sweden) B Borg	2	2
(Spain) J Burillo	7^{7}	0	1
(Spain) F Roig	6^{1}	6	6
(France) T Guardiola	5	3
2	(Spain) C Costa	7	6

Second round
(France) R Gilbert	6	4	7^{7}
(Argentina) G Pérez Roldán	1	6	6^{2}
(Italy) C Pistolesi	4	4
3	(France) G Forget	6	6
7/WC	(Russia) A Cherkasov	7	2	5
(Commonwealth of Independent States) A Medvedev	5	6	7
(Spain) F Roig	3	1
2	(Spain) C Costa	6	6

Quarterfinals
(France) R Gilbert	6	6
3	(France) G Forget	4	4
(Commonwealth of Independent States) A Medvedev	7^{8}	7^{8}
2	(Spain) C Costa	6^{6}	6^{6}

Semifinals
(France) R Gilbert	4	3
(Commonwealth of Independent States) A Medvedev	6	6
