= 1987 WCT Tournament of Champions =

- Date: May 4 – 10
- Edition: 11th
- Category: Grand Prix / WCT
- Draw: 64S / 32D
- Prize money: $500,000
- Surface: Clay / outdoor
- Location: Forest Hills, Queens, New York
- Venue: West Side Tennis Club

Champions

Singles
- (Ecuador) Andrés Gómez

Doubles
- (France) Guy Forget / (France) Yannick Noah
| ← 1986 · | WCT Tournament of Champions | · 1988 → |

The 1987 WCT Tournament of Champions, also known by its sponsored name Shearson Lehman Brothers Tournament of Champions, was a men's tennis tournament played on outdoor clay courts in Forest Hills, Queens, New York City in the United States. The event was part of the 1987 Grand Prix circuit and was organized by World Championship Tennis (WCT). It was the 11th edition of the tournament and was held from May 4 through May 10, 1987. Fourth-seeded Andrés Gómez won the singles title.

== Finals ==
=== Singles ===
(Ecuador) Andrés Gómez defeated (France) Yannick Noah 6–4, 7–6^{(7–5)}, 7–6^{(7–1)}

- It was Gomez' 1st singles title of the year and the 15th of his career.

=== Doubles ===
(France) Guy Forget / (France) Yannick Noah defeated (United States) Gary Donnelly / (United States) Peter Fleming 4–6, 6–4, 6–1
