= 1990 Grand Prix Passing Shot – Doubles =

Doubles
- 1990 Grand Prix Passing Shot

Final
- Champions: (Spain) Tomás Carbonell (Czechoslovakia) Libor Pimek
- Runners-up: (Iran) Mansour Bahrami (France) Yannick Noah
- Score: 6–3, 6–7, 6–2

Details
- Draw: 16 (1Q)
- Seeds: 4

Events
Singles	Doubles
← 1989 ·	ATP Bordeaux	· 1991 →

Tomás Carbonell and Carlos di Laura were the defending champions, but di Laura did not compete this year.

Carbonell teamed up with Libor Pimek and successfully defended his title, by defeating Mansour Bahrami and Yannick Noah 6–3, 6–7, 6–2 in the final.

== Seeds ==
1. (France) Jean-Philippe Fleurian / (France) Éric Winogradsky (first round)
2. (Socialist Federal Republic of Yugoslavia) Goran Ivanišević / (Hungary) Balázs Taróczy (first round)
3. (Spain) Tomás Carbonell / (Czechoslovakia) Libor Pimek (champions)
4. (Iran) Mansour Bahrami / (France) Yannick Noah (final)

== Draw ==
=== Key ===
- Q = Qualifier
- WC = Wild card
- LL = Lucky loser
- Alt = Alternate
- ITF = ITF entry
- PR = Protected ranking
- SR = Special ranking
- SE = Special exempt
- JE = Junior exempt
- JR = Junior Accelerator Programme entrant
- CO = College Accelerator Programme entrant
- NG = Next Gen Accelerator Program entrant
- w/o = Walkover
- r = Retired
- d = Defaulted

=== Draw ===
First round
1	(France) JP Fleurian (France) É Winogradsky	6	6	4
(Argentina) M Ingaramo (Argentina) G Pérez Roldán	3	7	6
(Haiti) R Agénor (France) F Santoro	6	2	2
(Spain) JF Altur (Spain) JL Aparisi	1	6	6
3	(Spain) T Carbonell (Czechoslovakia) L Pimek	6	6
Q	(Sweden) J Donar (Sweden) J Kjellsten	2	1
(Sweden) T Nydahl (Sweden) J Svensson	6	4	4
(Austria) A Antonitsch (Austria) T Muster	2	6	6
(Sweden) O Jonsson (Sweden) F Nilsson	3	5
(France) T Benhabiles (France) C Pioline	6	7
(Spain) J Arrese (Spain) C Costa	5	3
4	(Iran) M Bahrami (France) Y Noah	7	6
(Sweden) H Holm (United States) Scott Morse	2	2
(Sweden) R Båthman (Sweden) R Bergh	6	6
(Argentina) E Bengoechea (Belgium) E Masso	6	7
2	(Socialist Federal Republic of Yugoslavia) G Ivanišević (Hungary) B Tarózcy	3	5

Quarterfinals
(Argentina) M Ingaramo (Argentina) G Pérez Roldán	6	6
(Spain) JF Altur (Spain) JL Aparisi	0	3
3	(Spain) T Carbonell (Czechoslovakia) L Pimek	3	6	6
(Austria) A Antonitsch (Austria) T Muster	6	2	1
(France) T Benhabiles (France) C Pioline
4	(Iran) M Bahrami (France) Y Noah	w/o
(Sweden) R Båthman (Sweden) R Bergh	w/o
(Argentina) E Bengoechea (Belgium) E Masso

Semifinals
(Argentina) M Ingaramo (Argentina) G Pérez Roldán	6	5	3
3	(Spain) T Carbonell (Czechoslovakia) L Pimek	4	7	6
4	(Iran) M Bahrami (France) Y Noah	6	7	6
(Sweden) R Båthman (Sweden) R Bergh	7	5	3

Final
3	(Spain) T Carbonell (Czechoslovakia) L Pimek	6	6	6
4	(Iran) M Bahrami (France) Y Noah	3	7	2
