= 1990 Grand Prix Passing Shot =

- Date: 10–16 September
- Edition: 13th
- Category: World Series
- Draw: 32S / 16D
- Prize money: $270,000
- Surface: Clay / outdoor
- Location: Bordeaux, France
- Venue: Villa Primrose

Champions

Singles
- (France) Guy Forget

Doubles
- (Spain) Tomás Carbonell / (Belgium) Libor Pimek
← 1989 ·	Bordeaux Open	· 1991 →

The 1990 Grand Prix Passing Shot, also known as the Bordeaux Open, was a men's tennis tournament played on outdoor clay courts at Villa Primrose in Bordeaux, France that was part of the World Series of the 1990 ATP Tour. It was the 13th edition of the tournament and was held from 10 September until 16 September 1990. Fourth-seeded Guy Forget won the singles title.

== Finals ==
=== Singles ===
(France) Guy Forget defeated (Socialist Federal Republic of Yugoslavia) Goran Ivanišević 6–4, 6–3

- It was Forget's 1st singles title of the year and the 3rd of his career.

=== Doubles ===
(Spain) Tomás Carbonell / (Czechoslovakia) Libor Pimek defeated (Iran) Mansour Bahrami / (France) Yannick Noah 6–3, 6–7, 6–2
