= 1988 WCT Tournament of Champions – Singles =

Singles
- 1988 WCT Tournament of Champions

Final
- Champion: (United States) Andre Agassi
- Runner-up: (Socialist Federal Republic of Yugoslavia) Slobodan Živojinović
- Score: 7–5, 7–6^{(7–2)}, 7–5

Details
- Draw: 64 (5WC/8Q/1LL)
- Seeds: 16

Events
Singles	Doubles
← 1987 ·	WCT Tournament of Champions	· 1989 →

Andrés Gómez was the defending champion, but lost in the quarterfinals to Aaron Krickstein.

Andre Agassi won the title by defeating Slobodan Živojinović 7–5, 7–6^{(7–2)}, 7–5 in the final.

== Seeds ==
1. (Sweden) Stefan Edberg (quarterfinals)
2. (Ecuador) Andrés Gómez (quarterfinals)
3. (Argentina) Martín Jaite (first round)
4. (United States) John McEnroe (first round)
5. (United States) Andre Agassi (champion)
6. (Sweden) Mikael Pernfors (quarterfinals)
7. (United States) Aaron Krickstein (semifinals)
8. (Socialist Federal Republic of Yugoslavia) Slobodan Živojinović (final)
9. (United States) Jay Berger (third round)
10. (United States) Eliot Teltscher (second round)
11. (United States) Johan Kriek (first round)
12. (United States) Paul Annacone (first round)
13. (Brazil) Luiz Mattar (semifinals)
14. (New Zealand) Kelly Evernden (second round)
15. (Czechoslovakia) Milan Šrejber (third round)
16. (Austria) Thomas Muster (third round)

== Draw ==
=== Key ===
- Q = Qualifier
- WC = Wild card
- LL = Lucky loser
- Alt = Alternate
- SE = Special exempt
- PR = Protected ranking
- ITF = ITF entry
- JE = Junior exempt
- w/o = Walkover
- r = Retired
- d = Defaulted
- SR = Special ranking

=== Finals ===
Quarterfinals
1	(Sweden) Stefan Edberg	6	2	4
8	(Socialist Federal Republic of Yugoslavia) Slobodan Živojinović	1	6	6
13	(Brazil) Luiz Mattar	7	6
6	(Sweden) Mikael Pernfors	6	4
5/WC	(United States) Andre Agassi	6	6
(Spain) Alberto Tous	2	2
7	(United States) Aaron Krickstein	6	6	6
2	(Ecuador) Andrés Gómez	7	4	4

Semifinals
8	(Socialist Federal Republic of Yugoslavia) Slobodan Živojinović	7	7
13	(Brazil) Luiz Mattar	6	3
5/WC	(United States) Andre Agassi	6	6
7	(United States) Aaron Krickstein	3	3

Final
8	(Socialist Federal Republic of Yugoslavia) Slobodan Živojinović	5	6^{2}	5
5/WC	(United States) Andre Agassi	7	7^{7}	7

=== Top half ===
==== Section 1 ====
First round
1	(Sweden) S Edberg	6	7	6
Q	(United States) J Ross	7	6	2
Q	(Puerto Rico) M Nido	2	0
LL	(United States) M Freeman	6	6
(United States) J Canter	3	2
(United States) L Duncan	6	6
(South Africa) B Moir	1	0
16	(Austria) T Muster	6	6
9	(United States) J Berger	6	6
(United States) M Davis	2	3
(West Germany) P Kühnen	2	6
(West Germany) P Baur	6	7
Q	(Socialist Federal Republic of Yugoslavia) M Ostoja	7	2	6
Q	(Mexico) F Maciel	6	6	3
WC	(United States) J Courier	4	6	2
8	(Socialist Federal Republic of Yugoslavia) S Živojinović	6	1	6

Second round
1	(Sweden) S Edberg	7	7
LL	(United States) M Freeman	6	5
(United States) L Duncan	0	0
16	(Austria) T Muster	6	6
9	(United States) J Berger	6	6
(West Germany) P Baur	2	4
Q	(Socialist Federal Republic of Yugoslavia) M Ostoja	5	2
8	(Socialist Federal Republic of Yugoslavia) S Živojinović	7	6

Third round
1	(Sweden) S Edberg	6	6
16	(Austria) T Muster	4	3
9	(United States) J Berger	1	7	1
8	(Socialist Federal Republic of Yugoslavia) S Živojinović	6	6	6

Quarterfinals
1	(Sweden) S Edberg	6	2	4
8	(Socialist Federal Republic of Yugoslavia) S Živojinović	1	6	6

==== Section 2 ====
First round
4	(United States) J McEnroe	6	6	3
(Uruguay) D Pérez	7	2	6
(West Germany) D Keretić	4	6	6
(South Africa) D Visser	6	2	2
Q	(Peru) P Arraya	3	6	3
(United States) J Arias	6	3	6
(United States) P Johnson	1	1
13	(Brazil) L Mattar	6	6
12	(United States) P Annacone	5	6
Q	(Venezuela) N Pereira	7	7
(Chile) P Rebolledo	6	6
(Argentina) J Frana	4	1
Q	(United States) J Gurfein	6	6
(United States) B Scanlon	7	7
Q	(United States) P Sampras	5	5
6	(Sweden) M Pernfors	7	7

Second round
(Uruguay) D Pérez	7	6
(West Germany) D Keretić	5	3
(United States) J Arias	2	5
13	(Brazil) L Mattar	6	7
Q	(Venezuela) N Pereira	3	4
(Chile) P Rebolledo	6	6
(United States) B Scanlon	1	6	3
6	(Sweden) M Pernfors	6	4	6

Third round
(Uruguay) D Pérez	3	6	3
13	(Brazil) L Mattar	6	4	6
(Chile) P Rebolledo	6	2	1
6	(Sweden) M Pernfors	3	6	6

Quarterfinals
13	(Brazil) L Mattar	7	6
6	(Sweden) M Pernfors	6	4

=== Bottom half ===
==== Section 3 ====
First round
5/WC	(United States) A Agassi	6	6
(West Germany) A Maurer	0	1
(United States) S Davis	6	3	2
(United States) M Flur	4	6	6
(United States) M Chang	4	6	6
(South Africa) P Aldrich	6	4	1
(Australia) S Youl	6	6	7
11	(United States) J Kriek	7	4	5
14/WC	(New Zealand) K Evernden	6	6
(United States) M Dickson	3	3
(Peru) C di Laura	2	2
(Spain) A Tous	6	6
WC	(United States) R Reneberg	6	6
(United States) D Cassidy	1	2
(Israel) G Bloom	6	2	6
3	(Argentina) M Jaite	4	6	4

Second round
5/WC	(United States) A Agassi	6	6
(United States) M Flur	2	4
(United States) M Chang	4	6	7
(Australia) S Youl	6	2	6
14/WC	(New Zealand) K Evernden	6	1
(Spain) A Tous	7	6
WC	(United States) R Reneberg	6	3	2
(Israel) G Bloom	4	6	6

Third round
5/WC	(United States) A Agassi	6	6
(United States) M Chang	2	4
(Spain) A Tous	2	6	6
(Israel) G Bloom	6	3	2

Quarterfinals
5/WC	(United States) A Agassi	6	6
(Spain) A Tous	2	2

==== Section 4 ====
First round
7	(United States) A Krickstein	2	6	6
(Spain) J Aguilera	6	1	2
(Canada) M Wostenholme	2	5
(Spain) F Luna	6	7
(United States) J Brown	6	7
(Mexico) J Lozano	1	6
WC	(United States) L Scott	6	0
10	(United States) E Teltscher	7	6
15	(Czechoslovakia) M Šrejber	6	7
(Belgium) L Pimek	4	5
(United States) S Giammalva Jr.	6	6
(Spain) J Avendaño	3	1
(United Kingdom) S Shaw	5	6	0
(Argentina) H de la Peña	7	4	6
(Socialist Federal Republic of Yugoslavia) B Orešar	2	4
2	(Ecuador) A Gómez	6	6

Second round
7	(United States) A Krickstein	6	6
(Spain) F Luna	2	3
(United States) J Brown	6	6
10	(United States) E Teltscher	2	3
15	(Czechoslovakia) M Šrejber	2	7	6
(United States) S Giammalva Jr.	6	6	3
(Argentina) H de la Peña	2	1
2	(Ecuador) A Gómez	6	6

Third round
7	(United States) A Krickstein	6	7
(United States) J Brown	3	5
15	(Czechoslovakia) M Šrejber	1	0
2	(Ecuador) A Gómez	6	6

Quarterfinals
7	(United States) A Krickstein	6	6	6
2	(Ecuador) A Gómez	7	4	4
