= 1992 Grand Prix Passing Shot =

- Date: 14–20 September
- Edition: 15th
- Category: World Series
- Draw: 32S / 16D
- Prize money: $300,000
- Surface: Clay / outdoor
- Location: Bordeaux, France
- Venue: Villa Primrose

Champions

Singles
- (Commonwealth of Independent States) Andrei Medvedev

Doubles
- (Spain) Sergio Casal / (Spain) Emilio Sánchez
| ← 1991 · | Bordeaux Open | · 1993 → |

The 1992 Grand Prix Passing Shot, also known as the Bordeaux Open, was a men's tennis tournament played on outdoor clay courts at Villa Primrose in Bordeaux, France that was part of the World Series of the 1992 ATP Tour. It was the 15th edition of the tournament and was held from 14 September until 20 September 1992. Unseeded Andrei Medvedev won the singles title.

== Finals ==
=== Singles ===
(Commonwealth of Independent States) Andrei Medvedev defeated (Spain) Sergi Bruguera 6–3, 1–6, 6–2

- It was Medvedev's 3rd singles title of the year and of his career.

=== Doubles ===
(Spain) Sergio Casal / (Spain) Emilio Sánchez defeated (France) Arnaud Boetsch / (France) Guy Forget 6–1, 6–4
