= 1989 Eagle Tournament of Champions =

- Date: May 1–7
- Edition: 13th (singles) / 10th (doubles)
- Draw: 56S / 28D
- Prize money: $485,000
- Surface: Clay / outdoor
- Location: Forest Hills, New York, U.S.
- Venue: West Side Tennis Club

Champions

Singles
- (Czechoslovakia) Ivan Lendl

Doubles
- (United States) Rick Leach / (United States) Jim Pugh
← 1988 ·	WCT Tournament of Champions	· 1990 →

The 1989 Eagle Tournament of Champions was a men's tennis tournament played on outdoor clay courts at the West Side Tennis Club in Forest Hills, New York in the United States and was part of World Championship Tennis and the 1989 Nabisco Grand Prix. It was the 13th edition of the tournament and took place from May 1 through May 7, 1989. First-seeded Ivan Lendl won the singles title, his second at the event after 1985.

== Finals ==
=== Singles ===
(Czechoslovakia) Ivan Lendl defeated (Peru) Jaime Yzaga 6–2, 6–1

- It was Lendl's 4th singles title of the year and the 77th of his career.

=== Doubles ===
(United States) Rick Leach / (United States) Jim Pugh defeated (United States) Jim Courier / (United States) Pete Sampras 6–4, 6–2

- It was Leach's 4th title of the year and the 14th of his career. It was Pugh's 4th title of the year and the 14th of his career.
