= 1989 Eagle Tournament of Champions – Singles =

Singles
- 1989 Eagle Tournament of Champions
- 1988 Champion: (United States) Andre Agassi

Final
- Champion: (Czechoslovakia) Ivan Lendl
- Runner-up: (Peru) Jaime Yzaga
- Score: 6–2, 6–1

Events
Singles	Doubles
← 1988 ·	Eagle Tournament of Champions	· 1990 →

Andre Agassi was the defending champion but lost in the semifinals to Ivan Lendl.

Lendl won in the final 6–2, 6–1 against Jaime Yzaga.

== Seeds ==
A champion seed is indicated in bold text while text in italics indicates the round in which that seed was eliminated. The top eight seeds received a bye to the second round.

1. (Czechoslovakia) **Ivan Lendl (champion)**
2. (Sweden) Mats Wilander (second round)
3. (United States) Andre Agassi (semifinals)
4. (United States) Tim Mayotte (third round)
5. (France) Yannick Noah (second round)
6. (United States) Aaron Krickstein (quarterfinals)
7. (United States) Brad Gilbert (quarterfinals)
8. (United States) Michael Chang (semifinals)
9. (Ecuador) Andrés Gómez (third round)
10. (Socialist Federal Republic of Yugoslavia) Slobodan Živojinović (third round)
11. (Brazil) Luiz Mattar (third round)
12. (United States) Dan Goldie (first round)
13. (United States) Jay Berger (first round)
14. (United States) Jim Courier (third round)
15. (Uruguay) Marcelo Filippini (quarterfinals)
16. (Spain) Jordi Arrese (third round)

== Draw ==
=== Key ===
- Q = Qualifier
- WC = Wild card
- LL = Lucky loser
- Alt = Alternate
- SE = Special exempt
- PR = Protected ranking
- ITF = ITF entry
- JE = Junior exempt
- w/o = Walkover
- r = Retired
- d = Defaulted
- SR = Special ranking

=== Finals ===
Semifinals
1	(Czechoslovakia) **Ivan Lendl**	**6**	**6**
3	(United States) Andre Agassi	2	3
(Peru) **Jaime Yzaga**	**6**	**6**
8	(United States) Michael Chang	4	3

Final
1	(Czechoslovakia) **Ivan Lendl**	**6**	**6**
(Peru) Jaime Yzaga	2	1

=== Top half ===
==== Section 1 ====
First round
Q	(United States) R Weiss	1	4
Q	(Canada) **M Wostenholme**	**6**	**6**
(Brazil) **C Motta**	**6**	**7**
(West Germany) M Westphal	0	6
(Czechoslovakia) P Korda	4	**6**	5
16	(Spain) **J Arrese**	**6**	3	**7**
10	(Socialist Federal Republic of Yugoslavia) **S Živojinović**	**6**	3	**7**
(United States) L Duncan	4	**6**	5
(South Africa) **B Moir**	**6**	**6**
(Spain) A Tous	2	2
(India) V Amritraj	1	1
(Austria) **A Antonitsch**	**6**	**6**

Second round
1	(Czechoslovakia) **I Lendl**	**6**	**6**
Q	(Canada) M Wostenholme	2	3
(Brazil) C Motta	2	2
16	(Spain) **J Arrese**	**6**	**6**
10	(Socialist Federal Republic of Yugoslavia) **S Živojinović**	**6**	2	**6**
(South Africa) B Moir	4	**6**	2
(Austria) A Antonitsch	5	4
7	(United States) **B Gilbert**	**7**	**6**

Third round
1	(Czechoslovakia) **I Lendl**	**6**	**6**
16	(Spain) J Arrese	3	2
10	(Socialist Federal Republic of Yugoslavia) S Živojinović	6	3
7	(United States) **B Gilbert**	**7**	**6**

Quarterfinals
1	(Czechoslovakia) **I Lendl**	**6**	**6**
7	(United States) B Gilbert	0	1

==== Section 2 ====
First round
(Spain) **F Luna**	**6**	**6**
(United States) S Giammalva Jr.	3	3
(United States) **J Brown**	**6**	**6**
Q	(United States) G Holmes	1	1
(United States) J Arias	5	**6**	6
14	(United States) **J Courier**	**7**	4	**7**
11	(Brazil) **L Mattar**	**7**	**7**
(Brazil) D Marcelino	6	5
Q	(South Africa) C Campbell	2	0
(Argentina) **G Rivas**	**6**	**6**
(Argentina) **G Vilas**	**7**	**7**
Q	(Mexico) A Moreno	5	6

Second round
3	(United States) **A Agassi**	**6**	4	**6**
(Spain) F Luna	4	**6**	0
(United States) J Brown	**6**	5	4
14	(United States) **J Courier**	3	**7**	**6**
11	(Brazil) **L Mattar**	**6**	0	**7**
(Argentina) G Rivas	2	**6**	5
(Argentina) G Vilas	5	4
6	(United States) **A Krickstein**	**7**	**6**

Third round
3	(United States) **A Agassi**	3	**6**	**7**
14	(United States) J Courier	**6**	4	5
11	(Brazil) L Mattar	4	6
6	(United States) **A Krickstein**	**6**	**7**

Quarterfinals
3	(United States) **A Agassi**	**6**	2	**6**
6	(United States) A Krickstein	1	**6**	3

=== Bottom half ===
==== Section 3 ====
First round
(Peru) **J Yzaga**	**7**	**6**
WC	(United States) P Sampras	6	1
(Argentina) **J Frana**	**6**	**6**
WC	(Venezuela) N Pereira	2	2
(Spain) **S Bruguera**	**6**	**6**
12	(United States) D Goldie	3	1
13	(United States) J Berger	**7**	4	4
WC	(United States) **R Reneberg**	6	**6**	**6**
Q	(The Bahamas) M Knowles	1	3
(Uruguay) **D Pérez**	**6**	**6**
(Socialist Federal Republic of Yugoslavia) **B Orešar**	**6**	**6**
(Spain) E Osta	4	3

Second round
5	(France) Y Noah	2	2	r
(Peru) **J Yzaga**	**6**	**2**
(Argentina) J Frana	1	0	r
(Spain) **S Bruguera**	**6**	**1**
WC	(United States) R Reneberg	3	4
(Uruguay) **D Pérez**	**6**	**6**
(Socialist Federal Republic of Yugoslavia) B Orešar	6	4
4	(United States) **T Mayotte**	**7**	**6**

Third round
(Peru) **J Yzaga**	**7**	**7**
(Spain) S Bruguera	6	5
(Uruguay) **D Pérez**	4	**6**	**6**
4	(United States) T Mayotte	**6**	1	2

Quarterfinals
(Peru) **J Yzaga**	6	**6**	**6**
(Uruguay) D Pérez	**7**	0	2

==== Section 4 ====
First round
(Czechoslovakia) **J Čihák**	**7**	**6**
(West Germany) U Riglewski	5	1
(West Germany) **D Keretić**	**6**	**6**
(West Germany) P Baur	3	2
(United States) T Wilkison	3	0
9	(Ecuador) **A Gómez**	**6**	**6**
15	(Uruguay) **M Filippini**	**7**	**6**
(Chile) R Acuña	5	4
Q	(United States) C Garner	4	**6**	2
(Italy) **C Panatta**	**6**	4	**6**
(Argentina) G Giussani	4	1
(Italy) **F Cancellotti**	**6**	**6**

Second round
8	(United States) **M Chang**	**6**	4	**7**
(Czechoslovakia) J Čihák	4	**6**	5
(West Germany) D Keretić	4	4
9	(Ecuador) **A Gómez**	**6**	**6**
15	(Uruguay) **M Filippini**	**6**	**6**
(Italy) C Panatta	2	4
(Italy) **F Cancellotti**	**6**	**6**
2	(Sweden) M Wilander	1	3

Third round
8	(United States) **M Chang**	**6**	**7**
9	(Ecuador) A Gómez	3	6
15	(Uruguay) **M Filippini**	**6**	6	**6**
(Italy) F Cancellotti	1	**7**	2

Quarterfinals
8	(United States) **M Chang**	**6**	6	**6**
15	(Uruguay) M Filippini	4	**7**	2
