= Saga Africa =

"Saga Africa (ambiance secousse)"

Single by Yannick Noah

from the album Black & What
- B-side: "Night of Blues"
- Released: 1991
- Recorded: France
- Genre: Reggae, novelty song
- Length: 3:57
- Songwriters: Yannick Noah; Daisy Mac Neels; Milan Zdravkovic

Yannick Noah singles chronology
"Saga Africa (ambiance secousse)" (1991)	"Don't Stay" (1991)

"Saga Africa" (subtitled "Ambiance Secousse" in smaller letters on the single cover) is a song recorded by the former professional tennis player Yannick Noah, released in 1991 as the first single from his debut album, Black & What. The song is also available on the singer's album entitled Live, released in 2002.

== Background, writing, music and lyrics ==
The album Black & What was a success (certified Gold), and the single "Saga Africa", that mixes a special and sporty dance (a kind of African caterpillar), became one of the summer hits in France. Yannick Noah created the surprise performing the song on December 2, 1991, at the Palais des Sports of Gerland, Lyon, during the honour tour of the Davis Cup just after the victory of the French team that he was the captain, accompanied by his team for the dance.

Yannick Noah composed the lyrics himself, a mixture of French and Cameroonian expressions, while the rest of the album Black & What is mainly in English. He deliberately sings with a relatively pronounced accent. The lyrics include a tribute to the footballers of the Cameroon national football team named Les Lions Indomptables, especially Roger Milla, François Omam-Biyik and Thomas Nkono, whose names are mentioned in the words. He also refers to Paris and Yaoundé, soukouss and makossa. The music uses a sample of a Snap!'s song, "Mary Had a Little Boy".

== Chart performances ==
In France, "Saga Africa" went straight to number six on the chart edition of 1 June 1991, reached number two two weeks later and stayed there for non consecutive four weeks, being blocked by the successive two number one hits Mylène Farmer's "Désenchantée" and Les Inconnus' "Auteuil, Neuilly, Passy". It totaled 15 weeks in the top ten and 22 weeks in top 50. It achieved Gold status awarded by the Syndicat National de l'Édition Phonographique for 250,000 units. On the European Hot 100, "Saga Africa" started at number 34 on 15 June 1991 and reached a peak of number 14 in its sixth week.

== Track listings ==
CD maxi

1. "Saga Africa (ambiance secousse)" (single version) — 3:57
2. "Saga Africa (ambiance secousse)" (savana club mix) — 4:46
3. "Saga Africa (ambiance secousse)" (special club mix) — 5:00
4. "Night of Blues" — 3:45

7" single

1. "Saga Africa (ambiance secousse)" — 3:57
2. "Night of Blues" — 3:45

7" maxi

1. "Saga Africa (ambiance secousse)" (single version) — 3:57
2. "Saga Africa (ambiance secousse)" (savana club mix) — 4:46
3. "Saga Africa (ambiance secousse)" (special club mix) — 5:00

Cassette

1. "Saga Africa (ambiance secousse)" — 3:57
2. "Night of Blues" — 3:45

== Charts and certifications ==
=== Peak positions ===
Chart (1991)	Peak position
Europe (European Hot 100)	14
France (SNEP)	2

=== Year-end charts ===
Chart (1991)	Position
Europe (European Hot 100)	58

=== Certifications ===
Certifications for "Saga Africa"
Region	Certification	Certified units/sales
France (SNEP)	Gold	250,000^{*}
^{*} Sales figures based on certification alone.
