= 1989 Bordeaux Open – Singles =

Singles
- 1989 Bordeaux Open

Final
- Champion: (Czechoslovakia) Ivan Lendl
- Runner-up: (Spain) Emilio Sánchez
- Score: 6–2, 6–2

Details
- Draw: 32 (3WC/4Q)
- Seeds: 8

Events
Singles	Doubles
- ATP Bordeaux

Thomas Muster was the defending champion, but could not compete this year due to a car accident suffered in Key Biscayne.

Ivan Lendl won the title by defeating Emilio Sánchez 6–2, 6–2 in the final.

== Seeds ==
1. (Czechoslovakia) Ivan Lendl (champion)
2. (Spain) Emilio Sánchez (final)
3. (Austria) Horst Skoff (second round)
4. (Peru) Jaime Yzaga (semifinals)
5. (Socialist Federal Republic of Yugoslavia) Goran Prpić (quarterfinals)
6. (Spain) Javier Sánchez (first round)
7. (Spain) Jordi Arrese (first round)
8. (France) Henri Leconte (quarterfinals)

== Draw ==
Key

- Q = Qualifier
- WC = Wild card
- LL = Lucky loser
- Alt = Alternate
- ITF = ITF entry
- PR = Protected ranking
- SR = Special ranking
- SE = Special exempt
- JE = Junior exempt
- JR = Junior Accelerator Programme entrant
- CO = College Accelerator Programme entrant
- NG = Next Gen Accelerator Program entrant
- w/o = Walkover
- r = Retired
- d = Defaulted

=== Finals ===
Semifinals
1	(Czechoslovakia) Ivan Lendl	6	6
4	(Peru) Jaime Yzaga	3	3
(France) Jean-Philippe Fleurian	7	4	1
2	(Spain) Emilio Sánchez	6	6	6

Final
1	(Czechoslovakia) Ivan Lendl	6	6
2	(Spain) Emilio Sánchez	2	2

=== Top half ===
First round
1	(Czechoslovakia) I Lendl	7	6	6
(Czechoslovakia) K Nováček	6	7	1
(Soviet Union) A Võsand	1	1
(United States) L Duncan	6	6
(Argentina) E Bengoechea	6	1
(United States) J Brown	7	6
WC	(France) A Boetsch	2	2
8/WC	(France) H Leconte	6	6
4	(Peru) J Yzaga	6	7
WC	(France) F Santoro	4	6
(France) J Potier	4	3
(Spain) J Aguilera	6	6
(Brazil) L Mattar	6	2	5
(Brazil) C Motta	3	6	7
(Czechoslovakia) M Vajda	3	7	6
6	(Spain) J Sánchez	6	6	4

Second round
1	(Czechoslovakia) I Lendl	6	7
(United States) L Duncan	1	6
(United States) J Brown	3	6	3
8/WC	(France) H Leconte	6	3	6
4	(Peru) J Yzaga	6	6	2
(Spain) J Aguilera	7	3	1^{r}
(Brazil) C Motta	1	6	7
(Czechoslovakia) M Vajda	6	0	6

Quarterfinals
1	(Czechoslovakia) I Lendl	6	6
8/WC	(France) H Leconte	2	3
4	(Peru) J Yzaga	7	6
(Brazil) C Motta	6	2

Semifinals
1	(Czechoslovakia) I Lendl	6	6
4	(Peru) J Yzaga	3	3

=== Bottom half ===
First round
5	(Socialist Federal Republic of Yugoslavia) G Prpić	6	6
Q	(Belgium) X Daufresne	1	0
(Czechoslovakia) M Střelba	2	6	6
(Israel) G Bloom	6	4	3
(France) JP Fleurian	6	6
(Australia) C Limberger	3	4
Q	(Spain) JC Báguena	1	1
3	(Austria) H Skoff	6	6
7	(Spain) J Arrese	6	2
(Spain) T Carbonell	7	6
Q	(West Germany) Jens Peter	6	7
(Spain) F Luna	3	5
(Socialist Federal Republic of Yugoslavia) M Ostoja	6	6	6
Q	(Spain) J Clavet	7	2	3
(Uruguay) M Filippini	7	1	3
2	(Spain) E Sánchez	5	6	6

Second round
5	(Socialist Federal Republic of Yugoslavia) G Prpić	6	7
(Czechoslovakia) M Střelba	3	5
(France) JP Fleurian	6	6
3	(Austria) H Skoff	3	4
(Spain) T Carbonell	7	6
Q	(West Germany) J Peter	5	1
(Socialist Federal Republic of Yugoslavia) M Ostoja	6	4
2	(Spain) E Sánchez	7	6

Quarterfinals
5	(Socialist Federal Republic of Yugoslavia) G Prpić	2	3
(France) JP Fleurian	6	6
(Spain) T Carbonell	0	3
2	(Spain) E Sánchez	6	6

Semifinals
(France) JP Fleurian	7	4	1
2	(Spain) E Sánchez	6	6	6
