= Fernando Pérez Pascal =

Mexican tennis player

Fernando Pérez
- Full name: Fernando Pérez Pascal
- Country (sports): Mexico
- Born: October 3, 1964 (age 60)
- Height: 5 ft 11 in (180 cm)
- Plays: Right-handed
- Prize money: $12,170

Singles
- Highest ranking: No. 356 (November 23, 1987)

Doubles
- Career record: 3–5
- Highest ranking: No. 169 (May 15, 1989)

Team competitions
- Davis Cup: 7–6

Fernando Pérez Pascal (born October 3, 1964) is a Mexican former professional tennis player.

== Biography ==
A native of Mexico City, Pérez was the world's top ranked junior doubles player in 1982.

Pérez played college tennis for Louisiana State University (LSU) and won two Southeastern Conference singles championships, the first in 1983 and the second as a senior in 1986. During his collegiate career he also represented Mexico in international competition, including the 1983 Pan American Games in Caracas, where he was runner-up to American Greg Holmes in the singles event. In 1986 he teamed up with Leonardo Lavalle for a Davis Cup doubles win over Boris Becker (and Andreas Maurer), which helped Mexico secure a place in the World Group quarter-finals.

In the late 1980s, Pérez competed briefly on the professional tour, reaching a best singles ranking of 356 in the world. As a doubles player, he was a semi-finalist at the 1989 WCT Tournament of Champions in Forest Hills and reached three finals on the Challenger circuit.

Pérez, who met his wife Beth while at LSU, returned to Mexico after college but since the 1990s has lived in the United States.

== See also ==
- List of Mexico Davis Cup team representatives
