= Bobby Banck =

American tennis player and coach

- Country (sports): United States
- Born: May 16, 1964 (age 62) Buffalo, New York
- Height: 5 ft 5 in (165 cm)

Singles
- Career record: 1–1
- Highest ranking: No. 249 (May 18, 1987)

Grand Slam singles results
- Wimbledon: Q1 (1987)

Bobby Banck (born May 16, 1964) is an American tennis coach and former professional player.

Banck, who grew up in Buffalo, New York, was a national 14-and-under hard court champion. Another Buffalo product Jimmy Arias was in his age group and the pair combined to win a national doubles championship.

Trained at the Nick Bollitieri academy in Florida from 1980, Banck received a scholarship to the University of Arkansas and played there for two years. In 1986 he turned professional. He appeared in the main draw of the 1987 WCT Tournament of Champions and was beaten in the second round by Slobodan Živojinović.

Banck starting his coaching career with Jimmy Arias and later coached Aaron Krickstein. On the women's tour he has coached Mary Joe Fernández, Mary Pierce and Monica Seles.

In 2006 he was inducted into the Greater Buffalo Sports Hall of Fame.
