= 1989 Bordeaux Open – Doubles =

Doubles
- 1989 Bordeaux Open

Final
- Champions: (Spain) Tomás Carbonell (Peru) Carlos di Laura
- Runners-up: (Mexico) Agustín Moreno (Peru) Jaime Yzaga
- Score: 6–4, 6–3

Details
- Draw: 16
- Seeds: 4

Events
Singles	Doubles
- ATP Bordeaux

Joakim Nyström and Claudio Panatta were the defending champions, but none competed this year. Nyström chose to compete at Palermo during the same week.

Tomás Carbonell and Carlos di Laura won the title by defeating Agustín Moreno and Jaime Yzaga 6–4, 6–3 in the final.

== Seeds ==
1. (Spain) Tomás Carbonell / (Peru) Carlos di Laura (champions)
2. (Spain) Sergio Casal / (Spain) Emilio Sánchez (semifinals)
3. (Spain) Francisco Clavet / (Spain) Javier Sánchez (quarterfinals)
4. (Mexico) Agustín Moreno / (Peru) Jaime Yzaga (final)

== Draw ==
Key

- Q = Qualifier
- WC = Wild card
- LL = Lucky loser
- Alt = Alternate
- ITF = ITF entry
- PR = Protected ranking
- SR = Special ranking
- SE = Special exempt
- JE = Junior exempt
- JR = Junior Accelerator Programme entrant
- CO = College Accelerator Programme entrant
- NG = Next Gen Accelerator Program entrant
- w/o = Walkover
- r = Retired
- d = Defaulted

=== Draw ===
First round
1	(Spain) T Carbonell (Peru) C di Laura	7	7
(Israel) G Bloom (India) S Vasudevan	6	6
(New Zealand) B Derlin (Austria) H Skoff	3	4
(Czechoslovakia) I Lendl (United States) B Willenborg	6	6
3	(Spain) F Clavet (Spain) J Sánchez	5	6	6
(France) A Boetsch (France) T Champion	7	3	4
(Switzerland) H Günthardt (France) H Leconte	4	4
(Czechoslovakia) K Nováček (Czechoslovakia) M Vajda	6	6
(Spain) J Arrese (Socialist Federal Republic of Yugoslavia) G Prpić	3	6
(Spain) JC Báguena (Argentina) M Ingaramo	6	7
(Argentina) G Luza (Argentina) C Miniussi	0	3
4	(Mexico) A Moreno (Peru) J Yzaga	6	6
(Venezuela) A Mora (United States) J Schor	6	3	7
(United States) B Dickinson (United States) M Ozer	1	6	6
(Uruguay) M Filippini (Brazil) L Mattar	5	6
2	(Spain) S Casal (Spain) E Sánchez	7	7

Quarterfinals
1	(Spain) T Carbonell (Peru) C di Laura	7	6
(Czechoslovakia) I Lendl (United States) B Willenborg	6	3
3	(Spain) F Clavet (Spain) J Sánchez	6	2
(Czechoslovakia) K Nováček (Czechoslovakia) M Vajda	7	6
(Spain) JC Báguena (Argentina) M Ingaramo	3	7	3
4	(Mexico) A Moreno (Peru) J Yzaga	6	6	6
(Venezuela) A Mora (United States) J Schor	3	2
2	(Spain) S Casal (Spain) E Sánchez	6	6

Semifinals
1	(Spain) T Carbonell (Peru) C di Laura	3	6	6
(Czechoslovakia) K Nováček (Czechoslovakia) M Vajda	6	1	0
4	(Mexico) A Moreno (Peru) J Yzaga	6	3	7
2	(Spain) S Casal (Spain) E Sánchez	4	6	6

Final
1	(Spain) T Carbonell (Peru) C di Laura	6	6
4	(Mexico) A Moreno (Peru) J Yzaga	4	3
