= 1989 Eagle Tournament of Champions – Doubles =

Doubles
- 1989 Eagle Tournament of Champions
- 1988 Champions: (Mexico) Jorge Lozano; (United States) Todd Witsken

Final
- Champions: (United States) Rick Leach; (United States) Jim Pugh
- Runners-up: (United States) Jim Courier; (United States) Pete Sampras
- Score: 6–4, 6–2

Events
Singles	Doubles
← 1988 ·	Eagle Tournament of Champions	· 1990 →

Jorge Lozano and Todd Witsken were the defending champions but did not compete that year.

Rick Leach and Jim Pugh won in the final 6–4, 6–2 against Jim Courier and Pete Sampras.

== Seeds ==
Champion seeds are indicated in bold text while text in italics indicates the round in which those seeds were eliminated. The top four seeded teams received byes into the second round.

1. (United States) **Rick Leach** / (United States) **Jim Pugh (champions)**
2. (United States) John McEnroe / (United States) Patrick McEnroe (quarterfinals)
3. (United States) Scott Davis / (United States) Tim Wilkison (second round)
4. (Ecuador) Andrés Gómez / (Socialist Federal Republic of Yugoslavia) Slobodan Živojinović (second round)
5. (Czechoslovakia) Josef Čihák / (Czechoslovakia) Petr Korda (quarterfinals)
6. (United States) Dan Goldie / (United States) Greg Van Emburgh (second round)
7. (West Germany) Udo Riglewski / (Sweden) Tobias Svantesson (second round)
8. (Austria) Alex Antonitsch / (Italy) Claudio Panatta (second round)

== Draw ==
=== Key ===
- Q = Qualifier
- WC = Wild card
- LL = Lucky loser
- Alt = Alternate
- SE = Special exempt
- PR = Protected ranking
- ITF = ITF entry
- JE = Junior exempt
- w/o = Walkover
- r = Retired
- d = Defaulted
- SR = Special ranking

=== Final ===
Final

1
- (United States) **Rick Leach**
- (United States) **Jim Pugh**
**6**
**6**

- (United States) Jim Courier
- (United States) Pete Sampras
4
2

=== Top half ===
First round

Second round

Quarterfinals

Semifinals

1
- (United States) **R Leach**
- (United States) **J Pugh**
**7**
**6**

- (United States) H Endelman
- (United States) J Schmitt
2
4

- (Czechoslovakia) I Lendl
- (United States) J Palmer
6
4

- (Czechoslovakia) **I Lendl**
- (United States) **J Palmer**
**6**
**6**

1
- (United States) **R Leach**
- (United States) **J Pugh**
**7**
**7**

- (United States) S Giammalva Jr.
- (United States) R Reneberg
4
2

- (Brazil) D Marcelino
- (Venezuela) N Pereira
6
6

- (Brazil) **D Marcelino**
- (Venezuela) **N Pereira**
**6**
**6**

- (Brazil) **D Marcelino**
- (Venezuela) **N Pereira**
**7**
**6**

- (United States) J de Foor
- (United States) P Williamson
1
5

7
- (West Germany) U Riglewski
- (Sweden) T Svantesson
6
4

7
- (West Germany) **U Riglewski**
- (Sweden) **T Svantesson**
**6**
**7**

1
- (United States) **R Leach**
- (United States) **J Pugh**
**7**
**6**

- (Mexico) L Herrera
- (Mexico) F Pérez Pascal
5
1

4
(Ecuador) A Gómez
(Socialist Federal Republic of Yugoslavia) S Živojinović
3
**6**
6

- (United States) **E Korita**
- (United States) **F Viancos**
**6**
**7**

- (United States) **E Korita**
- (United States) **F Viancos**
**6**
2
**7**

- (The Bahamas) R Smith
- (Kenya) P Wekesa
2
6

- (United States) E Korita
- (United States) F Viancos
**6**
5
6

(West Germany) D Keretić
(Socialist Federal Republic of Yugoslavia) B Orešar
3
4

- (Mexico) **L Herrera**
- (Mexico) **F Pérez Pascal**
3
**7**
**7**

- (Mexico) **L Herrera**
- (Mexico) **F Pérez Pascal**
**6**
**6**

- (Mexico) **L Herrera**
- (Mexico) **F Pérez Pascal**
**7**
1
**6**

- (Argentina) J Frana
- (Uruguay) D Pérez
6
1

6
- (United States) D Goldie
- (United States) G Van Emburgh
6
**6**
4

6
- (United States) **D Goldie**
- (United States) **G Van Emburgh**
**7**
**6**

=== Bottom half ===
First round

Second round

Quarterfinals

Semifinals

5
- (Czechoslovakia) **J Čihák**
- (Czechoslovakia) **P Korda**
**6**
4
**6**

- (United States) M Flur
- (United States) G Holmes
4
**6**
4

5
- (Czechoslovakia) **J Čihák**
- (Czechoslovakia) **P Korda**
6
**6**
**6**

- (West Germany) **P Baur**
- (Brazil) **L Mattar**
**6**
3
**6**

- (West Germany) P Baur
- (Brazil) L Mattar
**7**
2
1

- (South Africa) C Campbell
- (Argentina) G Giussani
4
**6**
1

5
- (Czechoslovakia) J Čihák
- (Czechoslovakia) P Korda
**6**
4
4

- (United States) **J Courier**
- (United States) **P Sampras**
**6**
**6**

- (United States) **J Courier**
- (United States) **P Sampras**
4
**6**
**6**

- (Spain) J Arrese
- (Italy) F Cancellotti
2
1

- (United States) **J Courier**
- (United States) **P Sampras**
**6**
**6**

3
- (United States) S Davis
- (United States) T Wilkison
1
1

- (United States) **J Courier**
- (United States) **P Sampras**
**6**
**7**

8
- (Austria) **A Antonitsch**
- (Italy) **C Panatta**
**6**
**6**

- (Mexico) A Moreno
- (Peru) J Yzaga
2
5

- (United States) L Scott
- (United States) T Siegel
4
2

8
- (Austria) A Antonitsch
- (Italy) C Panatta
4
4

- (Mexico) **A Moreno**
- (Peru) **J Yzaga**
3
**6**
**6**

- (Mexico) **A Moreno**
- (Peru) **J Yzaga**
**6**
**6**

- (United States) J Klaparda
- (United States) J Sobel
**6**
2
0

- (Mexico) **A Moreno**
- (Peru) **J Yzaga**
6
**6**
**6**

- (Brazil) **C Motta**
- (Sweden) **M Wilander**
**6**
**6**

2
- (United States) J McEnroe
- (United States) P McEnroe
**7**
3
2

- (Chile) R Acuña
- (United States) J Berger
2
2

- (Brazil) C Motta
- (Sweden) M Wilander
1
**6**
6

2
- (United States) **J McEnroe**
- (United States) **P McEnroe**
**6**
3
**7**
