= 1987 WCT Tournament of Champions – Doubles =

Doubles
- 1987 WCT Tournament of Champions

Final
- Champions: (France) Guy Forget (France) Yannick Noah
- Runners-up: (United States) Gary Donnelly (United States) Peter Fleming
- Score: 4–6, 6–4, 6–1

Details
- Draw: 32
- Seeds: 8

Events
Singles	Doubles
- WCT Tournament of Champions

Hans Gildemeister and Andrés Gómez were the defending champions, but lost in the quarterfinals to Jimmy Arias and Eliot Teltscher.

Guy Forget and Yannick Noah won the title by defeating Gary Donnelly and Peter Fleming 4–6, 6–4, 6–1 in the final.

== Seeds ==
1. (Chile) Hans Gildemeister / (Ecuador) Andrés Gómez (quarterfinals)
2. (United States) Paul Annacone / (South Africa) Christo van Rensburg (second round)
3. (France) Guy Forget / (France) Yannick Noah (champions)
4. (United States) Gary Donnelly / (United States) Peter Fleming (final)
5. (Australia) Pat Cash / (Socialist Federal Republic of Yugoslavia) Slobodan Živojinović (quarterfinals)
6. (United States) Sherwood Stewart / (Australia) Kim Warwick (first round)
7. (Switzerland) Jakob Hlasek / (South Africa) Danie Visser (second round)
8. (United States) Matt Anger / (United States) Ken Flach (first round)

== Draw ==
Key

- Q = Qualifier
- WC = Wild card
- LL = Lucky loser
- Alt = Alternate
- ITF = ITF entry
- PR = Protected ranking
- SR = Special ranking
- SE = Special exempt
- JE = Junior exempt
- JR = Junior Accelerator Programme entrant
- CO = College Accelerator Programme entrant
- NG = Next Gen Accelerator Program entrant
- w/o = Walkover
- r = Retired
- d = Defaulted

=== Finals ===
Semifinals
(United States) Jimmy Arias (United States) Eliot Teltscher	6	4
3	(France) Guy Forget (France) Yannick Noah	7	6
4	(United States) Gary Donnelly (United States) Peter Fleming	7	7
(South Africa) Eddie Edwards (South Africa) Gary Muller	6	6

Final
3	(France) Guy Forget (France) Yannick Noah	4	6	6
4	(United States) Gary Donnelly (United States) Peter Fleming	6	4	1

=== Top half ===
First round
1	(Chile) H Gildemeister (Ecuador) A Gómez	7	6
(United States) B Scanlon (United States) L Scott	6	3
(United States) D Dowlen (United States) M Freeman	7	6
(United States) D Cassidy (United States) T Nelson	6	2
(South Africa) M Robertson (United States) T Warneke	6	6
(United States) G Layendecker (United States) L Shiras	3	4
(United States) J Arias (United States) E Teltscher	2	6	6
8	(United States) M Anger (United States) K Flach	6	2	1
3	(France) G Forget (France) Y Noah	2	6	6
(Brazil) N Aerts (United States) B Dickinson	6	1	4
(United States) M Flur (United States) S Giammalva Jr.	4	6	3
(United States) B Levine (United States) J Rive	6	4	6
(United States) E Korita (United States) J Levine	7	3	3
(United States) M Dickson (Italy) C Panatta	6	6	6
(West Germany) A Maurer (Spain) A Tous	6	3	2
5	(Australia) P Cash (Socialist Federal Republic of Yugoslavia) S Živojinović	4	6	6

Second round
1	(Chile) H Gildemeister (Ecuador) A Gómez	6	6
(United States) D Dowlen (United States) M Freeman	4	4
(South Africa) M Robertson (United States) T Warneke	6	3	4
(United States) J Arias (United States) E Teltscher	1	6	6
3	(France) G Forget (France) Y Noah	6	6
(United States) B Levine (United States) J Rive	4	3
(United States) M Dickson (Italy) C Panatta	6	2	3
5	(Australia) P Cash (Socialist Federal Republic of Yugoslavia) S Živojinović	4	6	6

Quarterfinals
1	(Chile) H Gildemeister (Ecuador) A Gómez	6	7	5
(United States) J Arias (United States) E Teltscher	7	5	7
3	(France) G Forget (France) Y Noah	6	7
5	(Australia) P Cash (Socialist Federal Republic of Yugoslavia) S Živojinović	4	5

Semifinals
(United States) J Arias (United States) E Teltscher	6	4
3	(France) G Forget (France) Y Noah	7	6

=== Bottom half ===
First round
6	(United States) S Stewart (Australia) K Warwick	6	6	6
(United States) M Bauer (Poland) W Fibak	7	3	7
(India) A Amritraj (West Germany) P Vojtíšek	5	4
(United States) M Davis (United States) T Pawsat	7	6
(United States) K Jones (United States) D Livingston	3	6	6
(Chile) R Acuña (United States) L Stefanki	6	3	4
(Argentina) M Jaite (Argentina) G Vilas	1	4
4	(United States) G Donnelly (United States) P Fleming	6	6
7	(Switzerland) J Hlasek (South Africa) D Visser	6	6
(Colombia) Á Jordan (Brazil) F Roese	2	2
(United States) J Berger (United States) J Lapidus	2	6
(South Africa) E Edwards (South Africa) G Muller	6	7
(United States) T Delatte (United States) E Fromm	3	6	6
(United States) R Baxter (United States) P Chamberlin	6	3	7
(Brazil) R Acioly (United States) R Matuszewski	7	2	3
2	(United States) P Annacone (South Africa) C van Rensburg	6	6	6

Second round
(United States) M Bauer (Poland) W Fibak	6	2	6
(United States) M Davis (United States) T Pawsat	2	6	3
(United States) K Jones (United States) D Livingston	6	5	3
4	(United States) G Donnelly (United States) P Fleming	2	7	6
7	(Switzerland) J Hlasek (South Africa) D Visser	3	4
(South Africa) E Edwards (South Africa) G Muller	6	6
(United States) R Baxter (United States) P Chamberlin	6	6
2	(United States) P Annacone (South Africa) C van Rensburg	3	4

Quarterfinals
(United States) M Bauer (Poland) W Fibak	3	3
4	(United States) G Donnelly (United States) P Fleming	6	6
(South Africa) E Edwards (South Africa) G Muller	2	7	6
(United States) R Baxter (United States) P Chamberlin	6	5	2

Semifinals
4	(United States) G Donnelly (United States) P Fleming	7	7
(South Africa) E Edwards (South Africa) G Muller	6	6
