= 1993 Grand Prix Passing Shot – Singles =

Singles
- 1993 Grand Prix Passing Shot

Final
- Champion: (Spain) Sergi Bruguera
- Runner-up: (Italy) Diego Nargiso
- Score: 7–5, 6–2

Details
- Draw: 32 (3WC/4Q/1LL)
- Seeds: 8

Events
Singles	Doubles
- ATP Bordeaux

Andrei Medvedev was the defending champion, but did not compete this year.

Sergi Bruguera won the title by defeating Diego Nargiso 7–5, 6–2 in the final.

== Seeds ==
1. (Spain) Sergi Bruguera (champion)
2. (Switzerland) Marc Rosset (semifinals)
3. (France) Arnaud Boetsch (semifinals)
4. (Spain) Javier Sánchez (quarterfinals)
5. (France) Fabrice Santoro (second round)
6. (France) Stéphane Simian (first round)
7. (Denmark) Kenneth Carlsen (first round)
8. (Sweden) Thomas Enqvist (quarterfinals)

== Draw ==
Key

- Q = Qualifier
- WC = Wild card
- LL = Lucky loser
- Alt = Alternate
- ITF = ITF entry
- PR = Protected ranking
- SR = Special ranking
- SE = Special exempt
- JE = Junior exempt
- JR = Junior Accelerator Programme entrant
- CO = College Accelerator Programme entrant
- NG = Next Gen Accelerator Program entrant
- w/o = Walkover
- r = Retired
- d = Defaulted

=== Finals ===
Semifinals
1	(Spain) Sergi Bruguera	4	6	6
3	(France) Arnaud Boetsch	6	4	3
LL	(Italy) Diego Nargiso	6	6
2	(Switzerland) Marc Rosset	3	4

Final
1	(Spain) Sergi Bruguera	7	6
LL	(Italy) Diego Nargiso	5	2

=== Top half ===
First round
1	(Spain) S Bruguera	6	6
WC	(France) L Roux	3	0
(France) H Leconte	7	4	6
(United States) B Shelton	5	6	1
(Russia) A Olhovskiy	6^{4}	6^{6}
(Argentina) A Mancini	7^{7}	7^{8}
(France) G Raoux	3	2
8	(Sweden) T Enqvist	6	6
3	(France) A Boetsch	6	6
Q	(South Africa) M Barnard	3	1
(Venezuela) N Pereira	7^{9}	7
Q	(Australia) S Youl	6^{7}	5
(France) R Gilbert	6^{3}	6	6
(Italy) G Pozzi	7^{7}	3	4
(Argentina) J Frana	7^{7}	6
6	(France) S Simian	6^{3}	3

Second round
1	(Spain) S Bruguera	6	6
(France) H Leconte	4	0
(Argentina) A Mancini	3	3
8	(Sweden) T Enqvist	6	6
3	(France) A Boetsch	7	7
(Venezuela) N Pereira	5	5
(France) R Gilbert	1	6^{4}
(Argentina) J Frana	6	7^{7}

Quarterfinals
1	(Spain) S Bruguera	6	6
8	(Sweden) T Enqvist	1	2
3	(France) A Boetsch	5	6	6
(Argentina) J Frana	7	3	3

Semifinals
1	(Spain) S Bruguera	4	6	6
3	(France) A Boetsch	6	4	3

=== Bottom half ===
First round
5	(France) F Santoro	6	6
(United States) J Tarango	1	4
LL	(Italy) D Nargiso	6	6
WC	(France) T Champion	3	3
(France) O Delaître	6	6
(Portugal) J Cunha e Silva	2	4
(Spain) J Burillo	3	6	1
4	(Spain) J Sánchez	6	3	6
7	(Denmark) K Carlsen	1	2
Q	(Czech Republic) L Němeček	6	6
WC	(France) S Huet	4	3
(United Kingdom) C Wilkinson	6	6
(Haiti) R Agénor	5	7^{7}	3
(United States) P McEnroe	7	6^{5}	6
Q	(United States) B Devening	1	3
2	(Switzerland) M Rosset	6	6

Second round
5	(France) F Santoro	1	2
LL	(Italy) D Nargiso	6	6
(France) O Delaître	2	6	0
4	(Spain) J Sánchez	6	2	6
Q	(Czech Republic) L Němeček	6	6
(United Kingdom) C Wilkinson	4	4
(United States) P McEnroe	4	3
2	(Switzerland) M Rosset	6	6

Quarterfinals
LL	(Italy) D Nargiso	6	7^{7}
4	(Spain) J Sánchez	4	6^{4}
Q	(Czech Republic) L Němeček	4	3
2	(Switzerland) M Rosset	6	6

Semifinals
LL	(Italy) D Nargiso	6	6
2	(Switzerland) M Rosset	3	4
