= 1993 Grand Prix Passing Shot =

- Date: 13–19 September
- Edition: 16th
- Category: World Series
- Draw: 32S / 16D
- Prize money: $330,000
- Surface: Hard / outdoor
- Location: Bordeaux, France
- Venue: Villa Primrose

Champions

Singles
- (Spain) Sergi Bruguera

Doubles
- (Argentina) Pablo Albano / (Argentina) Javier Frana
- Bordeaux Open

The 1993 Grand Prix Passing Shot, also known as the Bordeaux Open, was a men's tennis tournament played on outdoor hardcourts at Villa Primrose in Bordeaux, France that was part of the World Series of the 1993 ATP Tour. It was the 16th edition of the tournament and was held from 13 September until 19 September 1993. First-seeded Sergi Bruguera won the singles title.

== Finals ==
=== Singles ===
(Spain) Sergi Bruguera defeated (Italy) Diego Nargiso 7–5, 6–2

- It was Bruguera's 5th singles title of the year and 11th of his career.

=== Doubles ===
(Argentina) Pablo Albano / (Argentina) Javier Frana defeated (South Africa) David Adams / (Russia) Andrei Olhovskiy 7–6, 4–6, 6–3
