= 1985 WCT Tournament of Champions =

- Date: May 6–12
- Edition: 9th
- Category: Grand Prix (Super Series) / WCT
- Draw: 64S / 32D
- Prize money: $500,000
- Surface: Clay / outdoor
- Location: Forest Hills, Queens, New York, U.S.
- Venue: West Side Tennis Club

Champions

Singles
- (Czechoslovakia) Ivan Lendl

Doubles
- (United States) Ken Flach / (United States) Robert Seguso
← 1984 ·	WCT Tournament of Champions	· 1986 →

The 1985 WCT Tournament of Champions was a men's tennis tournament played on outdoor clay courts in Forest Hills, Queens, New York City in the United States. The event was part of the Super Series of the 1985 Grand Prix circuit and was organized by World Championship Tennis (WCT). It was the ninth edition of the tournament and was held from May 6 through May 12, 1985. No.2 seeded Ivan Lendl won the singles title, his second at the event after 1982.

== Finals ==
=== Singles ===
(Czechoslovakia) Ivan Lendl defeated (United States) John McEnroe 6–3, 6–3

- It was Lendl's 4th singles title of the year and the 46th of his career.

=== Doubles ===
(United States) Ken Flach / (United States) Robert Seguso defeated (Brazil) Givaldo Barbosa / (Brazil) Ivan Kley 7–5, 6–2

== See also ==
- Lendl–McEnroe rivalry
