= 1993 Grand Prix Passing Shot – Doubles =

Doubles
- 1993 Grand Prix Passing Shot

Final
- Champions: (Argentina) Pablo Albano (Argentina) Javier Frana
- Runners-up: (South Africa) David Adams (Russia) Andrei Olhovskiy
- Score: 7–6, 4–6, 6–3

Details
- Draw: 16
- Seeds: 4

Events
Singles	Doubles
- ATP Bordeaux

Sergio Casal and Emilio Sánchez were the defending champions, but Emilio Sánchez did not compete this year. Casal teamed up with Javier Sánchez and lost in the semifinals to Pablo Albano and Javier Frana.

Albano and Frana won the title by defeating David Adams and Andrei Olhovskiy 7–6, 4–6, 6–3 in the final.

== Seeds ==
1. (South Africa) David Adams / (Russia) Andrei Olhovskiy (final)
2. (Spain) Sergio Casal / (Spain) Javier Sánchez (semifinals)
3. (Norway) Bent-Ove Pedersen / (United States) Bryan Shelton (first round)
4. (France) Arnaud Boetsch / (France) Olivier Delaître (first round)

== Draw ==
Key

- Q = Qualifier
- WC = Wild card
- LL = Lucky loser
- Alt = Alternate
- ITF = ITF entry
- PR = Protected ranking
- SR = Special ranking
- SE = Special exempt
- JE = Junior exempt
- JR = Junior Accelerator Programme entrant
- CO = College Accelerator Programme entrant
- NG = Next Gen Accelerator Program entrant
- w/o = Walkover
- r = Retired
- d = Defaulted

=== Draw ===
First round
1	(South Africa) D Adams (Russia) A Olhovskiy	6	4	6
(United Kingdom) C Wilkinson (Australia) S Youl	2	6	4
(South Africa) M Barnard (United States) T Mercer	w/o
(United States) P McEnroe (United States) J Tarango
4	(France) A Boetsch (France) O Delaître	6	4	5
(Spain) J Burillo (Italy) D Nargiso	3	6	7
WC	(Haiti) R Agénor (France) H Leconte	7	3	2
(Portugal) J Cunha e Silva (France) G Raoux	6	6	6
Q	(France) T Champion (France) É Winogradsky	1	4
(United States) B Devening (Sweden) P Nyborg	6	6
(Argentina) P Albano (Argentina) J Frana	6	5	6
3	(Norway) BO Pedersen (United States) B Shelton	2	7	4
(United States) R Matuszewski (United States) J Sullivan	7	4	4
(South Africa) J de Beer (South Africa) B Haygarth	6	6	6
WC	(France) R Gilbert (Uruguay) D Pérez	5	7	1
2	(Spain) S Casal (Spain) J Sánchez	7	5	6

Quarterfinals
1	(South Africa) D Adams (Russia) A Olhovskiy	6	6
(South Africa) M Barnard (United States) T Mercer	4	4
(Spain) J Burillo (Italy) D Nargiso	1	2
(Portugal) J Cunha e Silva (France) G Raoux	6	6
(United States) B Devening (Sweden) P Nyborg	2	6
(Argentina) P Albano (Argentina) J Frana	6	7
(South Africa) J de Beer (South Africa) B Haygarth	3	7	4
2	(Spain) S Casal (Spain) J Sánchez	6	6	6

Semifinals
1	(South Africa) D Adams (Russia) A Olhovskiy	6	7
(Portugal) J Cunha e Silva (France) G Raoux	2	6
(Argentina) P Albano (Argentina) J Frana	6	6
2	(Spain) S Casal (Spain) J Sánchez	4	3

Final
1	(South Africa) D Adams (Russia) A Olhovskiy	6	6	3
(Argentina) P Albano (Argentina) J Frana	7	4	6
