= 1986 WCT Tournament of Champions =

- Date: May 5–11
- Edition: 10h
- Category: Grand Prix / WCT
- Draw: 64S / 32D
- Prize money: $500,000
- Surface: Clay / outdoor
- Location: Forest Hills, Queens, New York
- Venue: West Side Tennis Club

Champions

Singles
- (France) Yannick Noah

Doubles
- (Chile) Hans Gildemeister / (Ecuador) Andrés Gómez
- WCT Tournament of Champions

The 1986 WCT Tournament of Champions, also known by its sponsored name Shearson Lehman Brothers Tournament of Champions, was a men's tennis tournament played on outdoor clay courts in Forest Hills, Queens, New York City in the United States. The event was part of the 1986 Grand Prix circuit and was organized by World Championship Tennis (WCT). It was the tenth edition of the tournament and was held from May 5 through May 11, 1986. Fourth-seeded Yannick Noah won the singles title.

== Finals ==
=== Singles ===
(France) Yannick Noah defeated (Argentina) Guillermo Vilas 7–6^{(7–3)}, 6–0

- It was Noah's 1st singles title of the year and the 18th of his career.

=== Doubles ===
(Chile) Hans Gildemeister / (Ecuador) Andrés Gómez defeated (West Germany) Boris Becker / (Socialist Federal Republic of Yugoslavia) Slobodan Živojinović 7–6, 7–6
