= 1988 WCT Tournament of Champions =

Tennis tournament

- Date: May 2–8
- Edition: 11th
- Category: Grand Prix / WCT
- Draw: 64S / 32D
- Prize money: $485,000
- Surface: Clay / outdoor
- Location: Forest Hills, Queens, New York
- Venue: West Side Tennis Club

Champions

Singles
- (United States) Andre Agassi

Doubles
- (Mexico) Jorge Lozano / (United States) Todd Witsken
- WCT Tournament of Champions

The 1988 WCT Tournament of Champions, also known by its sponsored name Eagle Tournament of Champions, was a men's tennis tournament played on outdoor Har-Tru clay courts in Forest Hills, Queens, New York City in the United States. The event was part of the 1988 Grand Prix circuit and was organized by World Championship Tennis (WCT). It was the 11th edition of the tournament and was held from May 2 through May 8, 1988. Fifth-seeded Andre Agassi, who entered on a wildcard, won the singles title and earned $127,600 first-prize money. Due to rain some matches were played indoor at the Port Washington Tennis Academy.

== Finals ==
=== Singles ===
(United States) Andre Agassi defeated (Socialist Federal Republic of Yugoslavia) Slobodan Živojinović 7–5, 7–6^{(7–2)}, 7–5

- It was Agassi's 3rd singles title of the year and the 4th of his career.

=== Doubles ===
(Mexico) Jorge Lozano / (United States) Todd Witsken defeated (South Africa) Pieter Aldrich / (South Africa) Danie Visser 6–3, 7–6
