= 1989 Bordeaux Open =

- Date: 25–29 September
- Edition: 12th
- Category: Grand Prix
- Draw: 32S / 16D
- Prize money: $225,000
- Surface: Clay / outdoor
- Location: Bordeaux, France
- Venue: Villa Primrose

Champions

Singles
- (Czechoslovakia) Ivan Lendl

Doubles
- (Spain) Tomás Carbonell / (Peru) Carlos di Laura
- Bordeaux Open

The 1989 Bordeaux Open also known as the Grand Prix Passing Shot was a men's tennis tournament played on clay courts at Villa Primrose in Bordeaux in France that was part of the 1989 Nabisco Grand Prix. It was the 12th edition of the tournament and was held from 25 September until 29 September 1989. First-seeded Ivan Lendl won the singles title.

== Finals ==
=== Singles ===
(Czechoslovakia) Ivan Lendl defeated (Spain) Emilio Sánchez 6–2, 6–2

- It was Lendl's 8th singles title of the year and the 81st of his career.

=== Doubles ===
(Spain) Tomás Carbonell / (Peru) Carlos di Laura defeated (Mexico) Agustín Moreno / (Peru) Jaime Yzaga 6–4, 6–3
