= 1991 Grand Prix Passing Shot =

- Date: 9–15 September
- Edition: 14th
- Category: World Series
- Draw: 32S / 16D
- Prize money: $270,000
- Surface: Clay / outdoor
- Location: Bordeaux, France
- Venue: Villa Primrose

Champions

Singles
- (France) Guy Forget

Doubles
- (France) Arnaud Boetsch / (France) Guy Forget
← 1990 ·	Bordeaux Open	· 1992 →

The 1991 Grand Prix Passing Shot, also known as the Bordeaux Open, was a men's tennis tournament played on outdoor clay courts at Villa Primrose in Bordeaux, France that was part of the World Series of the 1991 ATP Tour. It was the 14th edition of the tournament and was held from 9 September until 15 September 1991. First-seeded Guy Forget, who entered on a wildcard, won his second consecutive singles title at the event.

== Finals ==
=== Singles ===
(France) Guy Forget defeated (France) Olivier Delaître 6–1, 6–3

- It was Forget's 4th singles title of the year and the 7th of his career.

=== Doubles ===
(France) Arnaud Boetsch / (France) Guy Forget defeated (Germany) Patrik Kühnen / (Germany) Alexander Mronz 6–2, 6–2
