= Yannick Noah =

French tennis player & singer (born 1960)

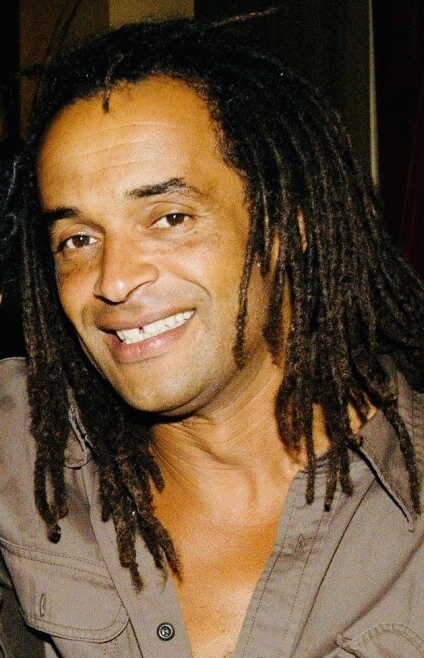
- Noah in 2003
- Country (sports): France
- Born: 18 May 1960 (age 66) Sedan, Ardennes, France
- Height: 1.93 m (6 ft 4 in)
- Turned pro: 1977
- Retired: 1996
- Plays: Right-handed (one-handed backhand)
- Prize money: $3,440,660
- Int. Tennis HoF: 2005 (member page)

Singles
- Career record: 478–209 (69.6%)
- Career titles: 23
- Highest ranking: No. 3 (7 July 1986)

Grand Slam singles results
- Australian Open: SF (1990)
- French Open: W (1983)
- Wimbledon: 3R (1979, 1985)
- US Open: QF (1983, 1985, 1989)

Other tournaments
- Tour Finals: QF (1982)
- Grand Slam Cup: 1R (1990)
- WCT Finals: SF (1988)

Doubles
- Career record: 213–109 (66.1%)
- Career titles: 16
- Highest ranking: No. 1 (25 August 1986)

Grand Slam doubles results
- French Open: W (1984)
- US Open: F (1985)

Team competitions
- Davis Cup: F (1982)

Yannick Noah (French pronunciation: [janik nɔa]; born 18 May 1960) is a French former professional tennis player and singer, who was inducted into the International Tennis Hall of Fame in 2005. Noah won the French Open in singles in 1983 and in doubles in 1984, and is a former captain of both France's Davis Cup and Billie Jean King Cup teams. During his nearly two-decade career, Noah captured 23 singles titles and 16 doubles titles, reaching a career-high singles ranking of world No. 3 in July 1986 and attaining the world No. 1 doubles ranking the following month. Since his retirement from the game, Noah has remained in the public eye as a popular music performer and as the co-founder, with his mother, of a charity organization for underprivileged children. He is commemorated each year at Roland-Garros with Yannick Noah's Day. Noah is also the father of former NBA player Joakim Noah.

== Early life ==
Born in Sedan, in the north of France in 1960, Yannick Noah is biracial. His late father was Cameroonian footballer, Zacharie Noah, and his mother, Marie-Claire, was French. After a sports injury in 1963, Noah's father returned to Africa with his family. Yannick was living in Cameroon when he made his debut in tennis and was discovered at age 11 by Arthur Ashe. He soon showed an amazing talent that brought him to the French Tennis Federation's training center in Nice in 1971.

== Tennis career ==
Noah turned professional in 1977 and won his first pro title on the Italian Spring Satellite in 1977 and his first top-level singles title in 1978 in Manila beating Peter Feigl in the final. He became France's most prominent tennis hero in 1983, becoming the first Frenchman in 37 years to win the French Open. He dropped only one set during the two-week-long tournament, and defeated the defending champion, Sweden's Mats Wilander, in straight sets in the final. Noah "boldly attacked the net and forced Wilander out of his baseline game". He remains the most recent Frenchman to have won the French Open men's singles title.

Noah won the French Open men's doubles title in 1984 (with compatriot and best friend Henri Leconte). He was also the men's doubles runner-up at the 1985 U.S. Open (with Leconte), and the 1987 French Open (with compatriot Guy Forget). In August 1986, Noah attained the world no. 1 doubles ranking, which he would hold for a total of 19 weeks. At the end of 1986, Noah received the ATP Sportsmanship Award, as voted for by other ATP players. He reached the quarter-final stage or better on 10 occasions at Grand Slam level. He notably admitted using marijuana prior to matches in 1981, saying that amphetamines were the real problem in tennis as they were performance-enhancing drugs.

In 1992, Noah received the Legion of Honour medal. Noah was awarded the Philippe Chatrier Award (the ITF's highest accolade) in 2005 and was inducted into the International Tennis Hall of Fame that same year. He remains France's highest male ranked player since the introduction of rankings in 1973. Noah played on France's Davis Cup team for eleven years, with an overall win–loss record of 39–22 (26–15 in singles, and in 13–7 doubles). In 1982, he was part of the French team which reached the Davis Cup final, where they were defeated 4–1 by the United States.

== Davis Cup/Fed Cup captain success ==
In 1991, Noah captained the French team to its first Davis Cup victory in 59 years, defeating a heavily favoured US team 3–1 in the final. This feat was repeated in 1996, when Noah coached the French team to defeat Sweden 3–2 in the final held in Malmö. In 2017, Noah added a third Davis Cup win for France under his guidance as captain, defeating Belgium in the final in Lille. In 1997, he also captained France's Fed Cup team to its first ever win of that competition when they defeated the Dutch in the final.

== Grand Slam singles performance timeline ==
Key
W	F	SF	QF	#R	RR	Q#	DNQ	A	NH

(W) winner; (F) finalist; (SF) semifinalist; (QF) quarterfinalist; (#R) rounds 4, 3, 2, 1; (RR) round-robin stage; (Q#) qualification round; (DNQ) did not qualify; (A) absent; (NH) not held; (SR) strike rate (events won / competed); (W–L) win–loss record.

Tournament	1977	1978	1979	1980	1981	1982	1983	1984	1985	1986	1987	1988	1989	1990	SR	W–L	Win %
Australian Open	A/A	1R	A	1R	A	A	A	A	A	NH	QF	4R	1R	SF	0 / 6	11–6	64.71
French Open	1R	3R	2R	4R	QF	QF	W	QF	4R	4R	QF	4R	1R	3R	1 / 14	40–13	75.47
Wimbledon	A	2R	3R	A	1R	A	A	A	3R	A	2R	A	A	1R	0 / 6	6–6	50.00
US Open	A	1R	4R	4R	4R	4R	QF	A	QF	3R	A	2R	QF	2R	0 / 11	28–11	71.79
Win–loss	0–1	3–4	6–3	6–3	7–3	7–2	11–1	4–1	9–3	5–2	8–3	7–3	4–3	8–4	1 / 37	85–36	70.25
Year-end ranking	305	49	26	18	13	10	5	9	7	4	8	12	16	40			

== Grand Slam finals ==
=== Singles: 1 (1–0) ===
Result	Year	Championship	Surface	Opponent	Score
Win	1983	French Open	Clay	(Sweden) Mats Wilander	6–2, 7–5, 7–6^{(7–3)}

=== Doubles: 3 (1–2) ===
Result	Year	Championship	Surface	Partner	Opponents	Score
Win	1984	French Open	Clay	(France) Henri Leconte	(Czechoslovakia) Pavel Složil (Czechoslovakia) Tomáš Šmíd	6–4, 2–6, 3–6, 6–3, 6–2
Loss	1985	US Open	Hard	(France) Henri Leconte	(United States) Ken Flach (United States) Robert Seguso	7–6^{(7–5)}, 6–7^{(1–7)}, 6–7^{(6–8)}, 0–6
Loss	1987	French Open	Clay	(France) Guy Forget	(Sweden) Anders Järryd (United States) Robert Seguso	7–6^{(7–5)}, 7–6^{(7–2)}, 3–6, 4–6, 2–6

== Career finals ==
=== Singles: 36 (23 titles / 13 runners-up) ===
Result	W–L	Date	Tournament	Surface	Opponent	Score
Loss	0–1	Apr 1978	Nice, France	Clay	(Spain) José Higueras	3–6, 4–6, 4–6
Win	1–1	Nov 1978	Manila, Philippines	Clay	(Austria) Peter Feigl	7–6, 6–0
Win	2–1	Dec 1978	Calcutta, India	Clay	(France) Pascal Portes	6–3, 6–2
Win	3–1	Mar 1979	Nancy, France	Hard (i)	(France) Jean-Louis Haillet	6–2, 5–7, 6–1, 7–5
Win	4–1	Sep 1979	Madrid, Spain	Clay	(Spain) Manuel Orantes	6–3, 6–7, 6–3, 6–2
Win	5–1	Oct 1979	Bordeaux, France	Clay	(United States) Harold Solomon	6–0, 6–7, 6–1, 1–6, 6–4
Loss	5–2	May 1980	Rome, Italy	Clay	(Argentina) Guillermo Vilas	0–6, 4–6, 4–6
Win	6–2	Feb 1981	Richmond WCT, U.S.	Carpet	(Czechoslovakia) Ivan Lendl	6–1, 3–1 ret.
Win	7–2	Apr 1981	Nice, France	Clay	(Bolivia) Mario Martinez	6–4, 6–2
Loss	7–3	Jul 1981	Gstaad, Switzerland	Clay	(Poland) Wojciech Fibak	1–6, 6–7
Win	8–3	Feb 1982	La Quinta, U.S.	Hard	(Czechoslovakia) Ivan Lendl	3–6, 6–2, 7–5
Loss	8–4	Apr 1982	Nice, France	Clay	(Hungary) Balázs Taróczy	2–6, 6–3, 11–13
Win	9–4	Aug 1982	South Orange, U.S.	Clay	(Mexico) Raúl Ramírez	6–3, 7–6^{(7–2)}
Win	10–4	Oct 1982	Basel, Switzerland	Hard (i)	(Sweden) Mats Wilander	6–4, 6–2, 6–3
Win	11–4	Dec 1982	Toulouse, France	Hard (i)	(Czechoslovakia) Tomáš Šmíd	6–3, 6–2
Loss	11–5	Apr 1983	Lisbon, Portugal	Clay	(Sweden) Mats Wilander	6–2, 6–7^{(2–7)}, 4–6
Win	12–5	May 1983	Madrid, Spain	Clay	(Sweden) Henrik Sundström	3–6, 6–0, 6–2, 6–4
Win	13–5	May 1983	Hamburg, West Germany	Clay	(Spain) José Higueras	3–6, 7–5, 6–2, 6–0
Win	14–5	Jun 1983	French Open, Paris	Clay	(Sweden) Mats Wilander	6–2, 7–5, 7–6^{(7–3)}
Loss	14–6	Feb 1984	La Quinta, U.S.	Hard	(United States) Jimmy Connors	2–6, 7–6^{(9–7)}, 3–6
Loss	14–7	Feb 1985	Memphis, U.S.	Carpet	(Sweden) Stefan Edberg	1–6, 0–6
Win	15–7	May 1985	Rome, Italy	Clay	(Czechoslovakia) Miloslav Mečíř	6–3, 3–6, 6–2, 7–6^{(7–4)}
Win	16–7	Jul 1985	Washington, D.C., U.S.	Clay	(Argentina) Martín Jaite	6–4, 6–3
Win	17–7	Oct 1985	Toulouse, France	Hard (i)	(Czechoslovakia) Tomáš Šmíd	6–4, 6–4
Loss	17–8	Oct 1985	Basel, Switzerland	Hard (i)	(Sweden) Stefan Edberg	7–6^{(9–7)}, 4–6, 6–7^{(5–7)}, 1–6
Loss	17–9	Mar 1986	La Quinta, U.S.	Hard	(Sweden) Joakim Nyström	1–6, 3–6, 2–6
Loss	17–10	Apr 1986	Monte Carlo, Monaco	Clay	(Sweden) Joakim Nyström	3–6, 2–6
Win	18–10	May 1986	Forest Hills, U.S.	Clay	(Argentina) Guillermo Vilas	7–6^{(7–3)}, 6–0
Loss	18–11	Oct 1986	Basel, Switzerland	Hard (i)	(Sweden) Stefan Edberg	6–7^{(5–7)}, 2–6, 7–6^{(9–7)}, 6–7^{(5–7)}
Win	19–11	Nov 1986	Wembley, England	Carpet	(Sweden) Jonas Svensson	6–2, 6–3, 6–7^{(12–14)}, 4–6, 7–5
Win	20–11	Feb 1987	Lyon, France	Carpet	(Sweden) Joakim Nyström	6–4, 7–5
Loss	20–12	May 1987	Forest Hills, U.S.	Clay	(Ecuador) Andrés Gómez	4–6, 6–7^{(5–7)}, 6–7^{(1–7)}
Win	21–12	Oct 1987	Basel, Switzerland	Hard (i)	(Haiti) Ronald Agénor	7–6^{(8–6)}, 6–4, 6–4
Win	22–12	Feb 1988	Milan, Italy	Carpet	(United States) Jimmy Connors	4–4, ret.
Loss	22–13	Mar 1989	Indian Wells, U.S.	Hard	(Czechoslovakia) Miloslav Mečíř	6–3, 6–2, 1–6, 2–6, 3–6
Win	23–13	Jan 1990	Sydney Outdoor, Australia	Hard	(West Germany) Carl-Uwe Steeb	5–7, 6–3, 6–4

=== Doubles: 25 (16 titles / 9 runners-up) ===
Result	W–L	Date	Tournament	Surface	Partner	Opponents	Score
Loss	0–1	Dec 1978	Calcutta, India	Clay	(France) Gilles Moretton	(India) Sashi Menon (United States) Sherwood Stewart	6–7, 4–6
Win	1–1	Apr 1981	Nice, France	Clay	(France) Pascal Portes	(New Zealand) Chris Lewis (Czechoslovakia) Pavel Složil	4–6, 6–3, 6–4
Win	2–1	Nov 1981	Paris, France	Hard (i)	(Romania) Ilie Năstase	(United Kingdom) Andrew Jarrett (United Kingdom) Jonathan Smith	6–4, 6–4
Win	3–1	Apr 1982	Nice, France	Clay	(France) Henri Leconte	(Australia) Paul McNamee (Hungary) Balázs Taróczy	5–7, 6–4, 6–3
Win	4–1	Oct 1982	Basel, Switzerland	Hard (i)	(France) Henri Leconte	(United States) Fritz Buehning (Czechoslovakia) Pavel Složil	6–2, 6–2
Loss	4–2	Dec 1982	Toulouse, France	Hard (i)	(France) Jean-Louis Haillet	(Czechoslovakia) Pavel Složil (Czechoslovakia) Tomáš Šmíd	4–6, 4–6
Loss	4–3	Apr 1983	Monte Carlo, Monaco	Clay	(France) Henri Leconte	(Switzerland) Heinz Günthardt (Hungary) Balázs Taróczy	2–6, 4–6
Loss	4–4	Jan 1984	Philadelphia, U.S.	Carpet	(France) Henri Leconte	(United States) Peter Fleming (United States) John McEnroe	2–6, 3–6
Win	5–4	Jun 1984	French Open, Paris	Clay	(France) Henri Leconte	(Czechoslovakia) Pavel Složil (Czechoslovakia) Tomáš Šmíd	6–4, 2–6, 3–6, 6–3, 6–2
Win	6–4	Apr 1985	Chicago, U.S.	Carpet	(United States) Johan Kriek	(United States) Ken Flach (United States) Robert Seguso	3–6, 4–6, 7–5, 6–1, 6–4
Loss	6–5	Sep 1985	U.S. Open, New York	Hard	(France) Henri Leconte	(United States) Ken Flach (United States) Robert Seguso	7–6, 6–7, 6–7, 0–6
Loss	6–6	Mar 1986	La Quinta, U.S.	Hard	(United States) Sherwood Stewart	(France) Guy Forget (United States) Peter Fleming	4–6, 3–6
Win	7–6	Apr 1986	Monte Carlo, Monaco	Clay	(France) Guy Forget	(Sweden) Joakim Nyström (Sweden) Mats Wilander	6–4, 3–6, 6–4
Win	8–6	May 1986	Rome, Italy	Clay	(France) Guy Forget	(Australia) Mark Edmondson (United States) Sherwood Stewart	7–6, 6–2
Win	9–6	Oct 1986	Basel, Switzerland	Hard (i)	(France) Guy Forget	(Sweden) Jan Gunnarsson (Czechoslovakia) Tomáš Šmíd	7–6, 6–4
Loss	9–7	Dec 1986	Masters Doubles, London	Carpet	(France) Guy Forget	(Sweden) Stefan Edberg (Sweden) Anders Järryd	3–6, 6–7, 3–6
Win	10–7	Feb 1987	Lyon, France	Carpet	(France) Guy Forget	(United States) Kelly Jones (United States) David Pate	4–6, 6–3, 6–4
Win	11–7	Feb 1987	Indian Wells, U.S.	Hard	(France) Guy Forget	(West Germany) Boris Becker (West Germany) Eric Jelen	6–4, 7–6
Win	12–7	May 1987	Forest Hills, U.S.	Clay	(France) Guy Forget	(United States) Gary Donnelly (United States) Peter Fleming	4–6, 6–4, 6–1
Win	13–7	May 1987	Rome, Italy	Clay	(France) Guy Forget	(Czechoslovakia) Miloslav Mečíř (Czechoslovakia) Tomáš Šmíd	6–2, 6–7, 6–3
Loss	13–8	Jun 1987	French Open, Paris	Clay	(France) Guy Forget	(Sweden) Anders Järryd (United States) Robert Seguso	7–6, 7–6, 3–6, 4–6, 2–6
Win	14–8	Jun 1987	London/Queen's Club, England	Grass	(France) Guy Forget	(United States) Rick Leach (United States) Tim Pawsat	6–4, 6–4
Win	15–8	Mar 1988	Orlando, U.S.	Hard	(France) Guy Forget	(United States) Sherwood Stewart (Australia) Kim Warwick	6–4, 6–4
Win	16–8	Apr 1990	Nice, France	Clay	(Argentina) Alberto Mancini	(Uruguay) Marcelo Filippini (Austria) Horst Skoff	6–4, 7–6
Loss	16–9	Sep 1990	Bordeaux, France	Clay	(Iran) Mansour Bahrami	(Spain) Tomás Carbonell (Belgium) Libor Pimek	3–6, 7–6, 2–6

== Music career ==
Yannick Noah
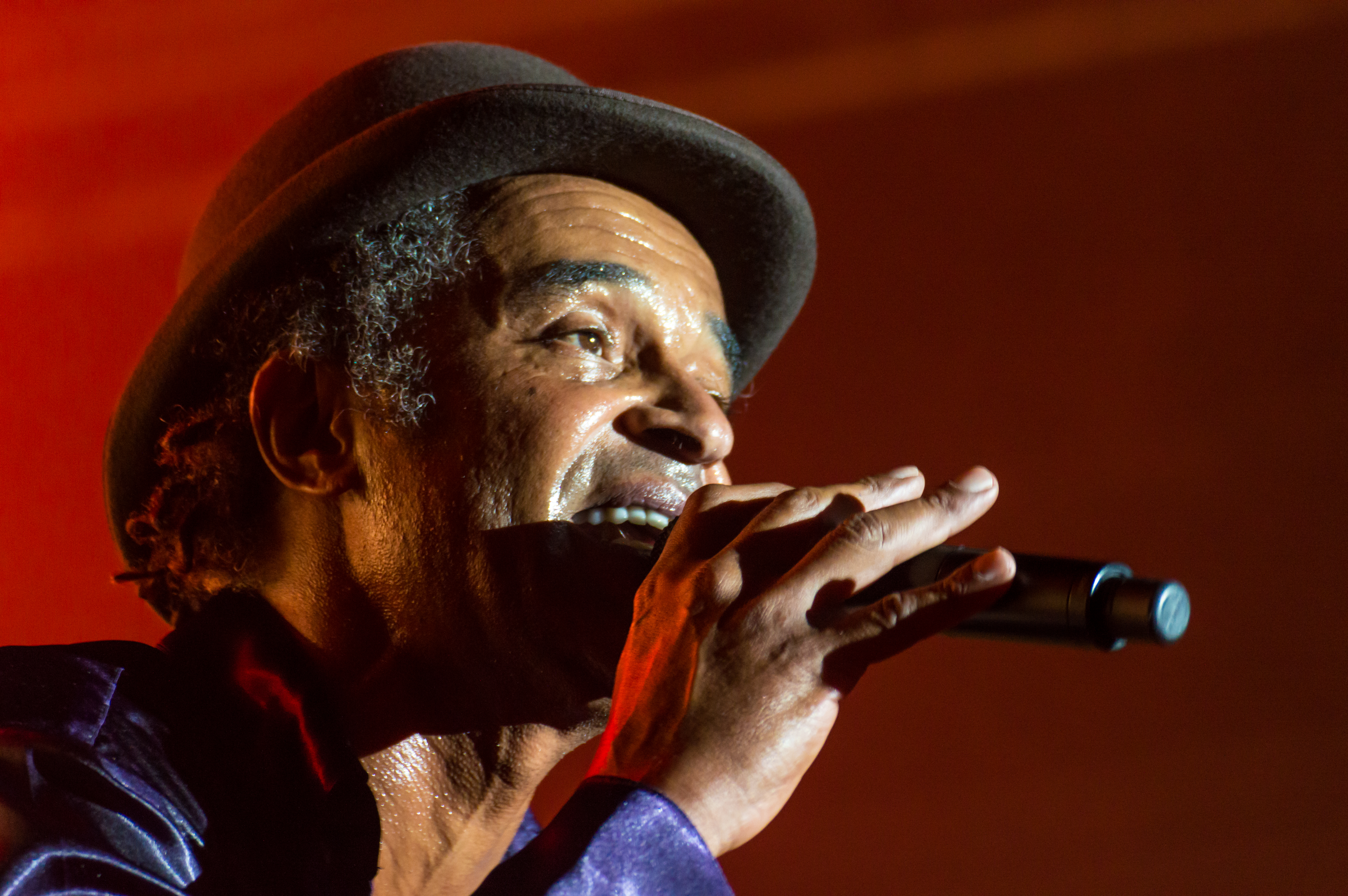
- Noah performing live at a concert in 2015

Background information
- Genre: Pop
- Occupation: Singer
- Instrument: Vocals
- Years active: 1991 – present
- Website: www.yannicknoah.com

After retiring from playing tennis, Noah developed a career as a popular singer, performing throughout Europe. He began his music career in 1991 with the album Black & What, featuring the popular track "Saga Africa", which he made the stadium sing with his players after the famous Davis Cup final win. In 1993, he released the album Urban Tribu with the single "Get on Back", followed by the album Zam Zam in 1998.

With the encouragement of his manager Jean-Pierre Weiller, his musical career got a great boost in 2000 with his self-titled 4th album Yannick Noah, written by Erick Benzi and Robert Goldman. The single "Simon Papa Tara" was written by Robert Goldman. The album also contained songs by Bob Marley and the group Téléphone. In 2005, Noah performed at Bob Geldof's Live 8 concert, a fundraiser aimed at alleviating poverty in Africa. On 21 July 2009, Noah made his U.S. live debut, headlining a concert in front of a packed house at the popular free outdoor performing arts festival in New York City, Central Park SummerStage. The performance was part of France's global music celebration Fête de la Musique. In 2010, Yannick made a comeback with the release of Frontières, his eighth album, containing the single "Angela", a tribute to Angela Davis. It also contained a duet with Aṣa in "Hello". On 25 September 2010, he filled the Stade de France for an exceptional concert that was attended by close to 80,000 spectators.

== Charity ==
Noah is active in charity work. He supports Enfants de la Terre, a charity created and run by his mother, Marie-Claire, in 1988. Noah also founded Fête le Mur in 1996, a tennis charity and adaptation for underprivileged children, especially in the poor areas and the banlieues. It is presided by Noah himself. He is also a spokesman for Appel des Enfants pour l'Environnement that was started by the World Wide Fund for Nature (WWF).

He took part in singing with Les Enfoirés to help Les Restos du Cœur. He also took part in telethons and sponsored the Téléthon 2005. He also sponsors the Association Terre-des-Hommes in Massongex (Suisse) and donated proceeds of his 2008 concert of Grands Gamins, to Sol En Si, an AIDS charity.

Noah has taken a particular interest in UN-SDG6, supporting the delivery of clean water through What Water ASBL. He has supported the cause on numerous occasions, including hosting an exhibition at his resort Village Noah in Yaoundé, Cameroon

Partly because of his involvement in a number of charities, Noah topped the list of the most favourite French personalities according to a joint survey of Ifop and Le Journal du Dimanche in 2007.

== Personal life ==
Noah first attended school in Yaounde (Cameroon), where his parents had settled after meeting and marrying in France. He then left Cameroon to attend a sports-and-study program in France under the sponsorship of the French Tennis Federation. He dropped out of the program at age 17 to move to full time tennis schedule.

Noah's father, Zacharie Noah, was a former professional Cameroonian football star who won the French Cup with Sedan in 1961. His mother, Marie-Claire, is a teacher and a former captain of France's basketball team.

Noah has six children, of whom two are from his first marriage in 1984 to Cécilia Rodhe (Miss Sweden 1978 and now a sculptor): Joakim (born in 1985) and Yelena (born in 1986). Joakim had a 13-year career in the NBA and represented France in international competitions. Yelena is a model and jewelry creator. With his second wife in 1995, British model Heather Stewart-Whyte, he has two daughters: Elijah (1996) and Jénayé (1997). After their divorce in 1999, Noah was awarded custody of his daughters from his second marriage by British courts. Then he married French TV producer Isabelle Camus, with whom he has a son named Joalukas (born 2004). He owns a restaurant in Saint Barthélemy in the French West Indies called Do Brazil. He then met Malika, who gave birth to his sixth child, a girl named Keelaani (born October 22, 2024).

On 15 July 1996, the French fiscal authorities demanded payment of 6,807,701 francs in back taxes for 1993–1994. The Paris administrative tribunal court confirmed the decision alleging that Noah kept three non-declared bank accounts in Switzerland, the Netherlands and the United States. Noah disputed the court decision as unconstitutional.

== Discography ==
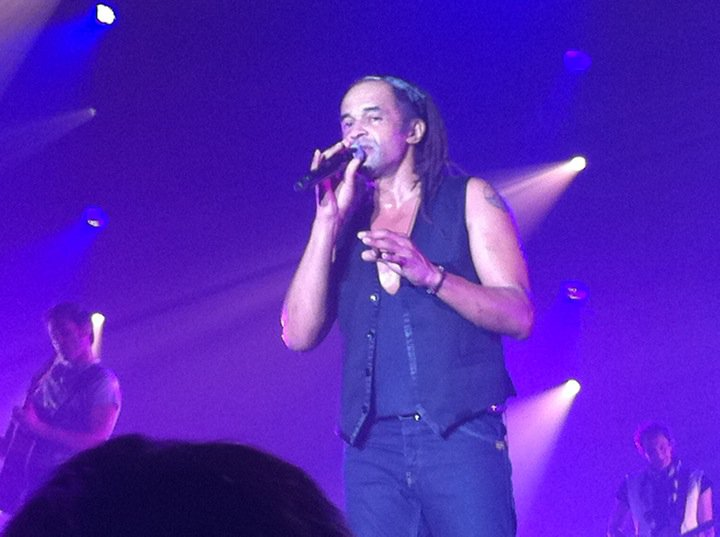
Yannick Noah, Rennes, 22 January 2011

=== Albums ===
Year	Album	Charts				Notes	Sales	Certifications
Year	Album	FR	BEL (Fl)	BEL (Wa)	SWI	Notes	Sales	Certifications
1991	Black & What					Includes Saga Africa		
1993	Urban Tribu							
1998	Zaam Zam							
2000	Yannick Noah	1	–	2	26			BEL: Platinum; FRA: Diamond; SWI: Gold
2002	Yannick Noah	16	–	40	82			
2003	Pokhara	1	–	2	23			BEL: Gold; FRA: 3× Platinum; SWI: Gold
2003	Métisse(s)	2	–	4	28			BEL: Gold; FRA: Platinum
2006	Charango	1	–	1	7	(including single Aux arbres citoyens)		BEL: Platinum; SWI: Gold
2010	Frontières	1	–	1	4		France: 585,000	BEL: Platinum; FRA: Diamond
2012	Hommage	1	–	1	19		France: 120,000	FRA: Platinum
2012	Combats ordinaires	1	162	2	20		France: 115,000	FRA: Platinum
2019	Bonheur indigo	5	–	6	40			
2022	La marfée	–	–	20	69			

Re-releases

- 2004: Yannick Noah / Live (2 CDs – FR #134)
- 2010: Charango / Pokhara (2 Cds – FR #103)

=== Singles ===
Year	Single	Charts			Certification	Album
Year	Single	FRA	BEL (Wa)	SWI	Certification	Album
1991	"Saga Africa (ambiance secousse)"	2	—	—		Black & What
1991	"Don't Stay (Far Away Baby)"	39	—	—		
2000	"Simon Papa Tara"	12	32	—		Yannick Noah
2001	"La voix des sages (No More Fighting)"	3	16	—		
2002	"Les lionnes"	16	—	—		
2002	"Jamafrica"	52	—	—		
2003	"Si tu savais"	22	31	77		Pokhara
2004	"Ose"	13	9	41		
2004	"Mon Eldorado (du soleil...)"	19	23	59		
2005	"Métis(se)" (with Disiz La Peste)	11	22	41		Métisse(s)
2006	"Donne-moi une vie"	8	5	46		Charango
2007	"Aux arbres citoyens"	1	2	41		
2007	"Destination ailleurs"	8	19	—		
2011	"Ça me regarde"	80	34	—		Frontières
2012	"Redemption Song"	48	33	—		Hommage
2014	"On court"	47	42	—		Combats ordinaires
2019	"Viens"	—	17	—		Bonheur indigo
2022	"La vie c'est maintenant"	—	49	—		La marfée

Awards and achievements
Preceded by Alain Giresse	French Sportsperson of the Year; 1983	Succeeded by Michel Platini
Preceded by (Sweden) Mats Wilander	Stefan Edberg Sportsmanship Award; 1986	Succeeded by (Czechoslovakia) Miloslav Mečíř
