= 1986 Dutch Open – Doubles =

Doubles
- 1986 Dutch Open

Final
- Champion: (Czechoslovakia) Miloslav Mečíř (Czechoslovakia) Tomáš Šmíd
- Runner-up: (Netherlands) Tom Nijssen (Netherlands) Johan Vekemans
- Score: 6–4, 6–2

Details
- Draw: 16
- Seeds: 4

Events
Singles	Doubles
← 1985 ·	Dutch Open	· 1987 →

The 1986 Dutch Open – Doubles was an event of the 1986 Dutch Open tennis tournament and was played on outdoor clay courts at 't Melkhuisje in Hilversum in the Netherlands from 28 July until 3 August 1986. The draw consisted of 16 teams of which 4 were seeded. Hans Simonsson and Stefan Simonsson were the defending Dutch Open doubles champions but did not compete in this edition. Unseeded Miloslav Mečíř and Tomáš Šmíd won the title by defeating Tom Nijssen and Johan Vekemans in the final, 6–4, 6–2.

== Seeds ==
1. (Switzerland) Jakob Hlasek / (Czechoslovakia) Pavel Složil (first round)
2. (Spain) David de Miguel / (Spain) Emilio Sánchez (quarterfinals)
3. (Sweden) Ronnie Båthman / (Denmark) Michael Mortensen (quarterfinals)
4. (Argentina) Gustavo Luza / (Argentina) Gustavo Tiberti (first round)

== Draw ==
=== Key ===
- Q = Qualifier
- WC = Wild card
- LL = Lucky loser
- Alt = Alternate
- SE = Special exempt
- PR = Protected ranking
- ITF = ITF entry
- JE = Junior exempt
- w/o = Walkover
- r = Retired
- d = Defaulted
- SR = Special ranking

First Round
1	(Switzerland) Jakob Hlasek (Czechoslovakia) Pavel Složil	3	2
(Australia) David Macpherson (Australia) Des Tyson	6	6
(Australia) Russell Barlow (Australia) Carl Limberger	7	2	6
(Netherlands) Menno Oosting (Netherlands) Huub van Boeckel	6	6	3
4	(Argentina) Gustavo Luza (Argentina) Gustavo Tiberti	1	0
(Czechoslovakia) Miloslav Mecir (Czechoslovakia) Tomáš Šmíd	6	6
(Austria) Thomas Muster (Sweden) Stefan Svensson	3	0
(Argentina) Javier Frana (Argentina) Gustavo Guerrero	6	6
(Czechoslovakia) Stanislav Birner (Germany) Ricki Osterthun	6	6
(Netherlands) Christian Feenstra (Netherlands) Jan-Willem Lodder	0	0
(Switzerland) Claudio Mezzadri (Brazil) Edvaldo Oliveira	5	3
3	(Sweden) Ronnie Båthman (Denmark) Michael Mortensen	7	6
(Finland) Mika Hedman (Switzerland) Dominik Utzinger	2	1
(Netherlands) Tom Nijssen (Netherlands) Johan Vekemans	6	6
(Italy) Paolo Canè (Italy) Simone Colombo	3	3
2	(Spain) David de Miguel (Spain) Emilio Sánchez	6	6

Quarterfinals
(Australia) David Macpherson (Australia) Des Tyson	7	6
(Australia) Russell Barlow (Australia) Carl Limberger	6	4
(Czechoslovakia) Miloslav Mečíř (Czechoslovakia) Tomáš Šmíd	7	6
(Argentina) Javier Frana (Argentina) Gustavo Guerrero	6	4
(Czechoslovakia) Stanislav Birner (Germany) Ricki Osterthun	0	7	6
3	(Sweden) Ronnie Båthman (Denmark) Michael Mortensen	6	5	4
(Netherlands) Tom Nijssen (Netherlands) Johan Vekemans	4	7	7
2	(Spain) David de Miguel (Spain) Emilio Sánchez	6	6	5

Semifinals
(Australia) David Macpherson (Australia) Des Tyson	3	4
(Czechoslovakia) Miloslav Mečíř (Czechoslovakia) Tomáš Šmíd	6	6
(Czechoslovakia) Stanislav Birner (Germany) Ricki Osterthun	6	5	2
(Netherlands) Tom Nijssen (Netherlands) Johan Vekemans	3	7	6

Final
(Czechoslovakia) Miloslav Mečíř (Czechoslovakia) Tomáš Šmíd	6	6
(Netherlands) Tom Nijssen (Netherlands) Johan Vekemans	4	2
