= 1985 Lorraine Open – Singles =

Singles
- 1985 Lorraine Open

Final
- Champion: (United States) Tim Wilkison
- Runner-up: (Socialist Federal Republic of Yugoslavia) Slobodan Živojinović
- Score: 4–6, 7–6, 9–7

Details
- Draw: 32 (4Q)
- Seeds: 8

Events
| Singles | Doubles |
| ← 1984 · | Lorraine Open | · 1986 → |

Defending champion Ramesh Krishnan chose to compete at Rotterdam during the same week, losing at the second round.

Tim Wilkison won the title by defeating Slobodan Živojinović 4–6, 7–6, 9–7 in the final.

== Seeds ==
1. (United States) Tim Wilkison (champion)
2. (United States) Sammy Giammalva Jr. (first round)
3. (France) Henri Leconte (quarterfinals)
4. (Israel) Shahar Perkiss (first round)
5. (Australia) John Frawley (quarterfinals)
6. (New Zealand) Chris Lewis (first round)
7. (Australia) Wally Masur (first round)
8. (Sweden) Thomas Högstedt (second round)

== Draw ==
=== Key ===
- Q = Qualifier
- WC = Wild card
- LL = Lucky loser
- Alt = Alternate
- SE = Special exempt
- PR = Protected ranking
- ITF = ITF entry
- JE = Junior exempt
- w/o = Walkover
- r = Retired
- d = Defaulted
- SR = Special ranking

=== Finals ===
Semifinals
1 | (United States) Tim Wilkison | 6 | 6
(France) Pascal Portes | 1 | 1
(United States) Chip Hooper | 6 | 6 | 4
(Socialist Federal Republic of Yugoslavia) Slobodan Živojinović | 7 | 3 | 6

Final
1 | (United States) Tim Wilkison | 4 | 7 | 9
(Socialist Federal Republic of Yugoslavia) Slobodan Živojinović | 6 | 6 | 7

=== Top half ===
First round
1 | (United States) T Wilkison | 6 | 6
(Czechoslovakia) J Navrátil | 3 | 4
Q | (France) É Winogradsky | 6 | 6 | 4
(United States) M De Palmer | 3 | 7 | 6
(South Africa) D Visser | 7 | 2 | 3
Q | (Iran) M Bahrami | 6 | 6 | 6
(France) J Potier | 5 | 4
5 | (Australia) J Frawley | 7 | 6
3 | (France) H Leconte | 6 | 6
(Israel) S Glickstein | 3 | 1
(Argentina) G Rivas | 1 | 1
(New Zealand) B Derlin | 6 | 6
(France) P Portes | 6 | 6
(Australia) C Limberger | 3 | 4
(United Kingdom) S Shaw | 3 | 6 | 6
7 | (Australia) W Masur | 6 | 2 | 4

Second round
1 | (United States) T Wilkison | 6 | 6
(United States) M De Palmer | 2 | 3
Q | (Iran) M Bahrami | 4 | 2
5 | (Australia) J Frawley | 6 | 6
3 | (France) H Leconte | 6 | 6
(New Zealand) B Derlin | 3 | 2
(France) P Portes | 6 | 6
(United Kingdom) S Shaw | 3 | 2

Quarterfinals
1 | (United States) T Wilkison | 6 | 4 | 8
5 | (Australia) J Frawley | 4 | 6 | 6
3 | (France) H Leconte | 4 | 6 | 2
(France) P Portes | 6 | 1 | 6

Semifinals
1 | (United States) T Wilkison | 6 | 6
(France) P Portes | 1 | 1

=== Bottom half ===
First round
6 | (New Zealand) C Lewis | 7 | 3 | 3
(France) J Vanier | 5 | 6 | 6
(West Germany) R Gehring | 3 | 6 | 6
(United States) M Freeman | 6 | 0 | 2
(United States) L Bourne | 0 | 2
(United States) R Harmon | 6 | 6
(United States) C Hooper | 6 | 7
4 | (Israel) S Perkiss | 3 | 6
8 | (Sweden) T Högstedt | 6 | 6
(Australia) B Drewett | 0 | 2
(France) L Courteau | 0 | 1
Q | (Austria) B Pils | 6 | 6
(Brazil) J Soares | 3 | 6 | 3
(Socialist Federal Republic of Yugoslavia) S Živojinović | 6 | 3 | 6
Q | (Austria) HP Kandler | 6 | 6
2 | (United States) S Giammalva Jr. | 1 | 2

Second round
(France) J Vanier | 3 | 3
(West Germany) R Gehring | 6 | 6
(United States) R Harmon | 3 | 4
(United States) C Hooper | 6 | 6
8 | (Sweden) T Högstedt | 3 | 2
Q | (Austria) B Pils | 6 | 6
(Socialist Federal Republic of Yugoslavia) S Živojinović | 7 | 6
Q | (Austria) HP Kandler | 6 | 1

Quarterfinals
(West Germany) R Gehring | 5 | 3
(United States) C Hooper | 7 | 6
Q | (Austria) B Pils | 2 | 6
(Socialist Federal Republic of Yugoslavia) S Živojinović | 6 | 7

Semifinals
(United States) C Hooper | 6 | 6 | 4
(Socialist Federal Republic of Yugoslavia) S Živojinović | 7 | 3 | 6
