= 1985 Lorraine Open – Doubles =

Doubles
- 1985 Lorraine Open

Final
- Champions: (United States) Marcel Freeman (United States) Rodney Harmon
- Runners-up: (Czechoslovakia) Jaroslav Navrátil (Sweden) Jonas Svensson
- Score: 6–4, 7–6

Details
- Draw: 16
- Seeds: 4

Events
Singles	Doubles
← 1984 ·	Lorraine Open	· 1986 →

Eddie Edwards and Danie Visser were the defending champions, but Edwards did not compete this year. Visser teamed up with Chip Hooper and lost in the semifinals to Jaroslav Navrátil and Jonas Svensson.

Marcel Freeman and Rodney Harmon won the title by defeating Navrátil and Svensson 6–4, 7–6 in the final.

== Seeds ==
1. (New Zealand) Chris Lewis / (Australia) Wally Masur (quarterfinals)
2. (United States) Mike De Palmer / (United States) Sammy Giammalva Jr. (quarterfinals)
3. (United States) Lloyd Bourne / (United States) Tim Wilkison (first round)
4. (France) Henri Leconte / (France) Pascal Portes (quarterfinals)

== Draw ==
=== Key ===
- Q = Qualifier
- WC = Wild card
- LL = Lucky loser
- Alt = Alternate
- SE = Special exempt
- PR = Protected ranking
- ITF = ITF entry
- JE = Junior exempt
- w/o = Walkover
- r = Retired
- d = Defaulted
- SR = Special ranking

=== Draw ===
First round
1	(New Zealand) C Lewis (Australia) W Masur	6	6
(Australia) R Barlow (Australia) C Limberger	1	1
(Czechoslovakia) J Čihák (Socialist Federal Republic of Yugoslavia) S Živojinović	6	3	4
(South Africa) C Honey (South Africa) C Steyn	4	6	6
3	(United States) L Bourne (United States) T Wilkison	5	6	4
(United States) M Freeman (United States) R Harmon	7	3	6
(France) T Pham (France) J Vanier	3	1
(France) F Errard (France) É Winogradsky	6	6
(France) Bernard Frances (France) C Lesage	5	3
(United States) C Hooper (South Africa) D Visser	7	6
(Israel) S Glickstein (Israel) S Perkiss	4	4
4	(France) H Leconte (France) P Portes	6	6
(Czechoslovakia) J Navrátil (Sweden) J Svensson	6	6
(Australia) J Frawley (West Germany) R Gehring	3	3
(New Zealand) B Derlin (United Kingdom) S Shaw	4	7	5
2	(United States) M De Palmer (United States) S Giammalva Jr.	6	5	7

Quarterfinals
1	(New Zealand) C Lewis (Australia) W Masur	4	2
(South Africa) C Honey (South Africa) C Steyn	6	6
(United States) M Freeman (United States) R Harmon	6	3	6
(France) F Errard (France) É Winogradsky	1	6	3
(United States) C Hooper (South Africa) D Visser	6	6	8
4	(France) H Leconte (France) P Portes	7	3	6
(Czechoslovakia) J Navrátil (Sweden) J Svensson	6	6
2	(United States) M De Palmer (United States) S Giammalva Jr.	2	3

Semifinals
(South Africa) C Honey (South Africa) C Steyn	1	6	3
(United States) M Freeman (United States) R Harmon	6	3	6
(United States) C Hooper (South Africa) D Visser	6	4	1
(Czechoslovakia) J Navrátil (Sweden) J Svensson	3	6	6

Final
(United States) M Freeman (United States) R Harmon	6	7
(Czechoslovakia) J Navrátil (Sweden) J Svensson	4	6
