= 1983 Lorraine Open – Doubles =

Doubles
- 1983 Lorraine Open

Final
- Champions: (Sweden) Jan Gunnarsson (Sweden) Anders Järryd
- Runners-up: (Chile) Ricardo Acuña (Chile) Belus Prajoux
- Score: 7–5, 6–3

Events
Singles	Doubles
← 1982 ·	Lorraine Open	· 1984 →

David Carter and Paul Kronk were the defending champions, but none competed this year.

Jan Gunnarsson and Anders Järryd won the title by defeating Ricardo Acuña and Belus Prajoux 7–5, 6–3 in the final.

== Seeds ==
1. (United States) Victor Amaya / (United States) Tom Gullikson (first round)
2. (Poland) Wojciech Fibak / (Australia) John Fitzgerald (quarterfinals)
3. (Sweden) Jan Gunnarsson / (Sweden) Anders Järryd (champions)
4. (South Africa) Tian Viljoen / (South Africa) Danie Visser (quarterfinals)

== Draw ==
=== Key ===
- Q = Qualifier
- WC = Wild card
- LL = Lucky loser
- Alt = Alternate
- SE = Special exempt
- PR = Protected ranking
- ITF = ITF entry
- JE = Junior exempt
- w/o = Walkover
- r = Retired
- d = Defaulted
- SR = Special ranking

=== Draw ===
First round
1	(United States) V Amaya (United States) T Gullikson	7	3	7
(South Africa) E Edwards (Finland) L Palin	5	6	9
(United States) M Davis (United States) C Dunk	1	7	7
(Sweden) S Edberg (United States) M Leach	6	6	6
(United States) M Brunnberg (South Africa) F Sauer	3	4
3	(Sweden) J Gunnarsson (Sweden) A Järryd	6	6
(Republic of Ireland) M Doyle (United States) C Hooper	3	6	6
(United States) T Cain (Chile) P Rebolledo	6	2	3
(Chile) R Acuña (Chile) B Prajoux	7	2	6
(Romania) I Nastase (Italy) A Panatta	6	6	3
4	(South Africa) T Viljoen (South Africa) D Visser	3	6	15
(Chile) J Fillol (Australia) R Frawley	6	3	13
(South Africa) R Moore (South Africa) S van der Merwe	6	6
(South Africa) B Pirow (South Africa) F Punčec	0	2
(United States) S Giammalva Jr. (United States) E Iskersky	3	4
2	(Poland) W Fibak (Australia) J Fitzgerald	6	6

Quarterfinals
(South Africa) E Edwards (Finland) L Palin	6	4	8
(United States) M Davis (United States) C Dunk	4	6	6
3	(Sweden) J Gunnarsson (Sweden) A Järryd	6	6
(Republic of Ireland) M Doyle (United States) C Hooper	4	1
(Chile) R Acuña (Chile) B Prajoux	6	7
4	(South Africa) T Viljoen (South Africa) D Visser	4	6
(South Africa) R Moore (South Africa) S van der Merwe	6	6
2	(Poland) W Fibak (Australia) J Fitzgerald	4	3

Semifinals
(South Africa) E Edwards (Finland) L Palin	4	1
3	(Sweden) J Gunnarsson (Sweden) A Järryd	6	6
(Chile) R Acuña (Chile) B Prajoux	7	4	6
(South Africa) R Moore (South Africa) S van der Merwe	5	6	4

Final
3	(Sweden) J Gunnarsson (Sweden) A Järryd	7	6
(Chile) R Acuña (Chile) B Prajoux	5	3
