= 1986 Dutch Open – Singles =

Singles
- 1986 Dutch Open

Final
- Champion: (Austria) Thomas Muster
- Runner-up: (Switzerland) Jakob Hlasek
- Score: 6–1, 6–3, 6–3

Details
- Draw: 32
- Seeds: 8

Events
| Singles | Doubles |
| ← 1985 · | Dutch Open | · 1987 → |

The 1986 Dutch Open – Singles was an event of the 1975 Dutch Open tennis tournament and was played on outdoor clay courts at 't Melkhuisje in Hilversum in the Netherlands from 28 July until 3 August 1986 The draw comprised 32 players and 8 of them were seeded. Ricki Osterthun was the defending Dutch Open singles champion but lost in the second round. Seventh-seeded Thomas Muster won the title by defeating Jakob Hlasek in the final, 6–1, 6–3, 6–3.

== Seeds ==
1. (Czechoslovakia) Miloslav Mečíř (quarterfinals)
2. (Spain) Emilio Sánchez (semifinals)
3. (Switzerland) Jakob Hlasek (final)
4. (Withdrew)
5. (Italy) Paolo Canè (quarterfinals)
6. (Netherlands) Michiel Schapers (second round)
7. (Austria) Thomas Muster (champion)
8. (Czechoslovakia) Marián Vajda (quarterfinals)

== Draw ==
=== Key ===
- Q = Qualifier
- WC = Wild card
- LL = Lucky loser
- Alt = Alternate
- SE = Special exempt
- PR = Protected ranking
- ITF = ITF entry
- JE = Junior exempt
- w/o = Walkover
- r = Retired
- d = Defaulted
- SR = Special ranking

=== Finals ===
Semifinals
7/WC | (Austria) Thomas Muster | 6 | 6
(Netherlands) Menno Oosting | 1 | 0
3 | (Switzerland) Jakob Hlasek | 6 | 7
2 | (Spain) Emilio Sánchez | 4 | 6

Final
7/WC | (Austria) Thomas Muster | 6 | 6 | 6
3 | (Switzerland) Jakob Hlasek | 1 | 3 | 3

=== Top half ===
First Round
1 | (Czechoslovakia) Miloslav Mečíř | 6 | 6
(Spain) Sergio Casal | 3 | 3
WC | (Australia) Carl Limberger | 3 | 6 | 3
(Czechoslovakia) Stanislav Birner | 6 | 3 | 6
(Spain) David de Miguel | 2 | 2
(Argentina) Eduardo Bengoechea | 6 | 6
(Spain) Juan Antonio Rodríguez | 0 | 0
7/WC | (Austria) Thomas Muster | 6 | 6
3 | (Czechoslovakia) Tomáš Šmíd | 2 | 3
(West Germany) Ricki Osterthun | 6 | 6
(West Germany) Andreas Maurer | 6 | 6
(Australia) Mark Woodforde | 1 | 4
(Netherlands) Menno Oosting | 6 | 6
(Czechoslovakia) Pavel Složil | 4 | 2
(West Germany) Michael Westphal | 4 | 4
6 | (Netherlands) Michiel Schapers | 6 | 6

Second Round
1 | (Czechoslovakia) Miloslav Mečíř | 6 | 6
(Czechoslovakia) Stanislav Birner | 0 | 3
(Argentina) Eduardo Bengoechea | 2 | 6 | 1
7/WC | (Austria) Thomas Muster | 6 | 1 | 6
(West Germany) Ricki Osterthun | 6 | 3 | 4
(West Germany) Andreas Maurer | 4 | 6 | 6
(Netherlands) Menno Oosting | 4 | 6 | 7
6 | (Netherlands) Michiel Schapers | 6 | 2 | 6

Quarterfinals
1 | (Czechoslovakia) Miloslav Mečíř | 6 | 6 | 5
7/WC | (Austria) Thomas Muster | 4 | 7 | 7
(West Germany) Andreas Maurer | 6 | 4 | 6
(Netherlands) Menno Oosting | 3 | 6 | 7

Semifinals
7/WC | (Austria) Thomas Muster | 6 | 6
(Netherlands) Menno Oosting | 1 | 0

=== Bottom half ===
First Round
5 | (Italy) Paolo Canè | 6 | 7
(United Kingdom) Jeremy Bates | 0 | 6
Q | (Netherlands) Jan-Willem Lodder | 6 | 6
Q | (Argentina) Gustavo Tiberti | 4 | 1
(Switzerland) Claudio Mezzadri | 6 | 6
(France) Thierry Champion | 4 | 2
Q | (Netherlands) Christian Feenstra | 4 | 4
3 | (Switzerland) Jakob Hlasek | 6 | 6
8 | (Czechoslovakia) Marián Vajda | 6 | 6
(Sweden) Peter Lindgren | 1 | 2
(Sweden) Ronnie Båthman | 5 | 6 | 6
(Belgium) Eduardo Masso | 7 | 1 | 3
WC | (Switzerland) Roland Stadler | 6 | 6
(West Germany) Tore Meinecke | 1 | 4
Q | (Argentina) Carlos Castellan | 2 | 1
2 | (Spain) Emilio Sánchez | 6 | 6

Second Round
5 | (Italy) Paolo Canè | 6 | 6
Q | (Netherlands) Jan-Willem Lodder | 1 | 3
(Switzerland) Claudio Mezzadri | 6 | 5 | 2
3 | (Switzerland) Jakob Hlasek | 4 | 7 | 6
8 | (Czechoslovakia) Marián Vajda | 7 | 6
(Sweden) Ronnie Båthman | 6 | 4
WC | (Switzerland) Roland Stadler | 3 | 6 | 4
2 | (Spain) Emilio Sánchez | 6 | 2 | 6

Quarterfinals
5 | (Italy) Paolo Canè | 4 | 6 | 1
3 | (Switzerland) Jakob Hlasek | 6 | 3 | 6
8 | (Czechoslovakia) Marián Vajda | 3 | 4
2 | (Spain) Emilio Sánchez | 6 | 6

Semifinals
3 | (Switzerland) Jakob Hlasek | 6 | 7
2 | (Spain) Emilio Sánchez | 4 | 6
