= 1989 Lorraine Open – Doubles =

Doubles
- 1989 Lorraine Open
- 1988 Champions: (Czechoslovakia) Jaroslav Navrátil (Netherlands) Tom Nijssen

Final
- Champions: (West Germany) Udo Riglewski (Sweden) Tobias Svantesson
- Runners-up: (Portugal) João Cunha e Silva (Belgium) Eduardo Masso
- Score: 6–4, 6–7, 7–6

Events
Singles	Doubles
← 1988 ·	Lorraine Open

Jaroslav Navrátil and Tom Nijssen were the defending champions but did not compete that year.

Udo Riglewski and Tobias Svantesson won in the final 6–4, 6–7, 7–6 against João Cunha e Silva and Eduardo Masso.

== Seeds ==
Champion seeds are indicated in bold text while text in italics indicates the round in which those seeds were eliminated.

1. (Switzerland) Claudio Mezzadri / (Italy) Claudio Panatta (first round)
2. (Netherlands) Menno Oosting / (Netherlands) Johan Vekemans (quarterfinals)
3. (West Germany) **Udo Riglewski** / (Sweden) **Tobias Svantesson (champions)**
4. (New Zealand) Steve Guy / (Finland) Olli Rahnasto (first round)

== Draw ==
=== Key ===
- Q = Qualifier
- WC = Wild card
- LL = Lucky loser
- Alt = Alternate
- SE = Special exempt
- PR = Protected ranking
- ITF = ITF entry
- JE = Junior exempt
- w/o = Walkover
- r = Retired
- d = Defaulted
- SR = Special ranking

First round
1	(Switzerland) C Mezzadri (Italy) C Panatta	**6**	3	3
(Belgium) **L Pimek** (United States) **L Scott**	4	**6**	**6**
(United States) R Baxter (United States) M De Palmer	3	2
(France) **A Boetsch** (Italy) **U Colombini**	**6**	**6**
3	(West Germany) **U Riglewski** (Sweden) **T Svantesson**	**6**	**6**
(France) F Errard (France) J Potier	2	3
(United States) P Chamberlin (Kenya) P Wekesa	**7**	6	6
(France) **O Delaître** (France) **T Tulasne**	6	**7**	**7**
(United States) T Nelson (France) J-M Piacentile	3	4
(Iran) **M Bahrami** (France) **E Winogradsky**	**6**	**6**
(Australia) **R Barlow** (United Kingdom) **D Felgate**	**7**	**6**
4	(New Zealand) S Guy (Finland) O Rahnasto	6	2
(Portugal) **J Cunha e Silva** (Belgium) **E Masso**	**6**	**6**
(Australia) P Carter (Australia) B Dyke	2	2
(France) G Raoux (France) F Santoro	3	2
2	(Netherlands) **M Oosting** (Netherlands) **J Vekemans**	**6**	**6**

Quarterfinals
(Belgium) L Pimek (United States) L Scott	1	**7**	2
(France) **A Boetsch** (Italy) **U Colombini**	**6**	6	**6**
3	(West Germany) **U Riglewski** (Sweden) **T Svantesson**	**7**	**6**
(France) O Delaître (France) T Tulasne	6	4
(Iran) **M Bahrami** (France) **E Winogradsky**	**6**	**7**
(Australia) R Barlow (United Kingdom) D Felgate	4	5
(Portugal) **J Cunha e Silva** (Belgium) **E Masso**	**6**	3	**6**
2	(Netherlands) M Oosting (Netherlands) J Vekemans	2	**6**	3

Semifinals
(France) A Boetsch (Italy) U Colombini	**7**	4	5
3	(West Germany) **U Riglewski** (Sweden) **T Svantesson**	6	**6**	**7**
(Iran) M Bahrami (France) E Winogradsky	5	4
(Portugal) **J Cunha e Silva** (Belgium) **E Masso**	**7**	**6**

Final
3	(West Germany) **Udo Riglewski** (Sweden) **Tobias Svantesson**	**6**	6	**7**
(Portugal) João Cunha e Silva (Belgium) Eduardo Masso	4	**7**	6
