= 1986 Dutch Open (tennis) =

- Date: 28 July – 3 August
- Edition: 29th
- Category: Grand Prix
- Draw: 32S / 16D
- Prize money: $100,000
- Surface: Clay / outdoor
- Location: Hilversum, Netherlands
- Venue: 't Melkhuisje

Champions

Singles
- (Austria) Thomas Muster

Doubles
- (Czechoslovakia) Miloslav Mečíř / (Czechoslovakia) Tomáš Šmíd
- Dutch Open

The 1986 Dutch Open was a Grand Prix men's tennis tournament staged in Hilversum, Netherlands. The tournament was played on outdoor clay courts and was held from 28 July until 3 August 1986. It was the 29th edition of the tournament. Seventh-seeded Thomas Muster, who entered on a wildcard, won the singles title.

== Finals ==
=== Singles ===
(Austria) Thomas Muster defeated (Switzerland) Jakob Hlasek 6–1, 6–3, 6–3

- It was Muster's first singles title of his career.

=== Doubles ===
(Czechoslovakia) Miloslav Mečíř / (Czechoslovakia) Tomáš Šmíd defeated (Netherlands) Tom Nijssen / (Netherlands) Johan Vekemans 6–4, 6–2
