= 1989 Lorraine Open – Singles =

Singles
- 1989 Lorraine Open
- 1988 Champion: (Sweden) Jonas Svensson

Final
- Champion: (France) Guy Forget
- Runner-up: (Netherlands) Michiel Schapers
- Score: 6–3, 7–6

Events
Singles	Doubles
← 1988 ·	Lorraine Open	· 1990 →

Jonas Svensson was the defending champion but did not compete that year.

Guy Forget won in the final 6–3, 7–6 against Michiel Schapers.

== Seeds ==
A champion seed is indicated in bold text while text in italics indicates the round in which that seed was eliminated.

1. (Australia) Darren Cahill (second round)
2. (Haiti) Ronald Agénor (quarterfinals)
3. (France) **Guy Forget (champion)**
4. (Sweden) Jan Gunnarsson (first round)
5. (West Germany) Eric Jelen (first round)
6. (United States) Richard Matuszewski (first round)
7. (Netherlands) Michiel Schapers (final)
8. (France) Thierry Tulasne (second round)

== Draw ==
=== Key ===
- Q = Qualifier
- WC = Wild card
- LL = Lucky loser
- Alt = Alternate
- SE = Special exempt
- PR = Protected ranking
- ITF = ITF entry
- JE = Junior exempt
- w/o = Walkover
- r = Retired
- d = Defaulted
- SR = Special ranking

First round
1	(Australia) **D Cahill**	4	**6**	**7**
(France) E Winogradsky	**6**	3	6
(Sweden) **J Carlsson**	**6**	3	**6**
(New Zealand) S Guy	4	**6**	3
(Australia) B Dyke	4	6
(Belgium) **E Masso**	**6**	**7**
(Senegal) Y Doumbia	6	1
8	(France) **T Tulasne**	**7**	**6**
3	(France) **G Forget**	**6**	**6**
(United States) T Nelson	2	2
(Switzerland) **C Mezzadri**	**6**	**7**
WC	(Iran) M Bahrami	1	6
Q	(France) **A Boetsch**	**6**	**6**
(Italy) C Panatta	4	4
(France) **O Delaître**	**6**	**6**
6	(United States) R Matuszewski	3	2
5	(West Germany) **E Jelen**	5	**6**	**6**
(Switzerland) R Stadler	**7**	4	3
(Finland) O Rahnasto	4	6
(United Kingdom) **J Bates**	**6**	**7**
(United States) **P Chamberlin**	**6**	**6**
(Kenya) P Wekesa	4	3
(France) **J Potier**	**7**	**7**
4	(Sweden) J Gunnarsson	5	6
7	(Netherlands) **M Schapers**	**6**	**6**
(Sweden) N Kulti	3	4
Q	(France) **G Raoux**	**6**	**6**
(West Germany) U Riglewski	3	4
Q	(Socialist Federal Republic of Yugoslavia) M Ostoja	3	**7**	1
Q	(France) **D Durand**	**6**	6	**6**
(West Germany) H Moraing	5	4
2	(Haiti) **R Agénor**	**7**	**6**

Second round
1	(Australia) D Cahill	4	1
(Sweden) **J Carlsson**	**6**	**6**
(Belgium) **E Masso**	**6**	2	**7**
8	(France) T Tulasne	4	**6**	6
3	(France) **G Forget**	**7**	**6**
(Switzerland) C Mezzadri	5	4
Q	(France) A Boetsch	4	**6**	2
(France) **O Delaître**	**6**	1	**6**
5	(West Germany) E Jelen	1	2
(United Kingdom) **J Bates**	**6**	**6**
(United States) **P Chamberlin**	**7**	**6**
(France) J Potier	6	4
7	(Netherlands) **M Schapers**	**6**	**7**
Q	(France) G Raoux	3	5
Q	(France) D Durand	2	3
2	(Haiti) **R Agénor**	**6**	**6**

Quarterfinals
(Sweden) J Carlsson	4	**7**	3
(Belgium) **E Masso**	**6**	5	**6**
3	(France) **G Forget**	**6**	**6**
(France) O Delaître	4	3
(United Kingdom) J Bates	4	4
(United States) **P Chamberlin**	**6**	**6**
7	(Netherlands) **M Schapers**	**7**	**7**
2	(Haiti) R Agénor	6	6

Semifinals
(Belgium) E Masso	3	5
3	(France) **G Forget**	**6**	**7**
(United States) P Chamberlin	2	0^{r}
7	(Netherlands) **M Schapers**	**6**	1

Final
3	(France) **Guy Forget**	**6**	**7**
7	(Netherlands) Michiel Schapers	3	6
