= 1985 ABN World Tennis Tournament =

- Date: 18–24 March
- Edition: 13th
- Category: Grand Prix circuit
- Draw: 32S / 16D
- Prize money: $250,000
- Surface: Carpet / indoor
- Location: Rotterdam, Netherlands
- Venue: Rotterdam Ahoy

Champions

Singles
- (Czechoslovakia) Miloslav Mečíř

Doubles
- (Czechoslovakia) Pavel Složil / (Czechoslovakia) Tomáš Šmíd
- ABN World Tennis Tournament

The 1985 ABN World Tennis Tournament was a men's tennis tournament played on indoor carpet courts at Rotterdam Ahoy in the Netherlands. It was part of the 1985 Nabisco Grand Prix. The tournament was held from 18 March through 24 March 1985. Unseeded Miloslav Mečíř won the singles title.

== Finals ==
=== Singles ===
(Czechoslovakia) Miloslav Mečíř defeated (Switzerland) Jakob Hlasek 6–1, 6–2

- It was Mečíř's first singles title of his career.

=== Doubles ===
(Czechoslovakia) Pavel Složil / (Czechoslovakia) Tomáš Šmíd defeated (United States) Vitas Gerulaitis / (Australia) Paul McNamee 6–4, 6–4

== Prize money ==
Event	W	F	SF	QF	Round of 16	Round of 32
Singles	$50,000	$25,000	$13,250	$7,125	$3,875	$2,125
Doubles*	$15,000	$7,500	$4,150	$2,600	$1,725	—N/a

_{*per team}
