= 1987 Dutch Open (tennis) =

Tennis tournament

- Date: 27 July – 2 August
- Edition: 30th
- Category: Grand Prix
- Draw: 32S / 16D
- Prize money: $150,000
- Surface: Clay / outdoor
- Location: Hilversum, Netherlands
- Venue: 't Melkhuisje

Champions

Singles
- (Czechoslovakia) Miloslav Mečíř

Doubles
- (Poland) Wojciech Fibak / (Czechoslovakia) Miloslav Mečíř
- Dutch Open

The 1987 Dutch Open was a Grand Prix men's tennis tournament staged at the Melkhuisje in Hilversum, Netherlands. The tournament was played on outdoor clay courts and was held from 27 July until 2 August 1987. It was the 30th edition of the tournament. First-seeded Miloslav Mečíř won the singles title.

== Finals ==
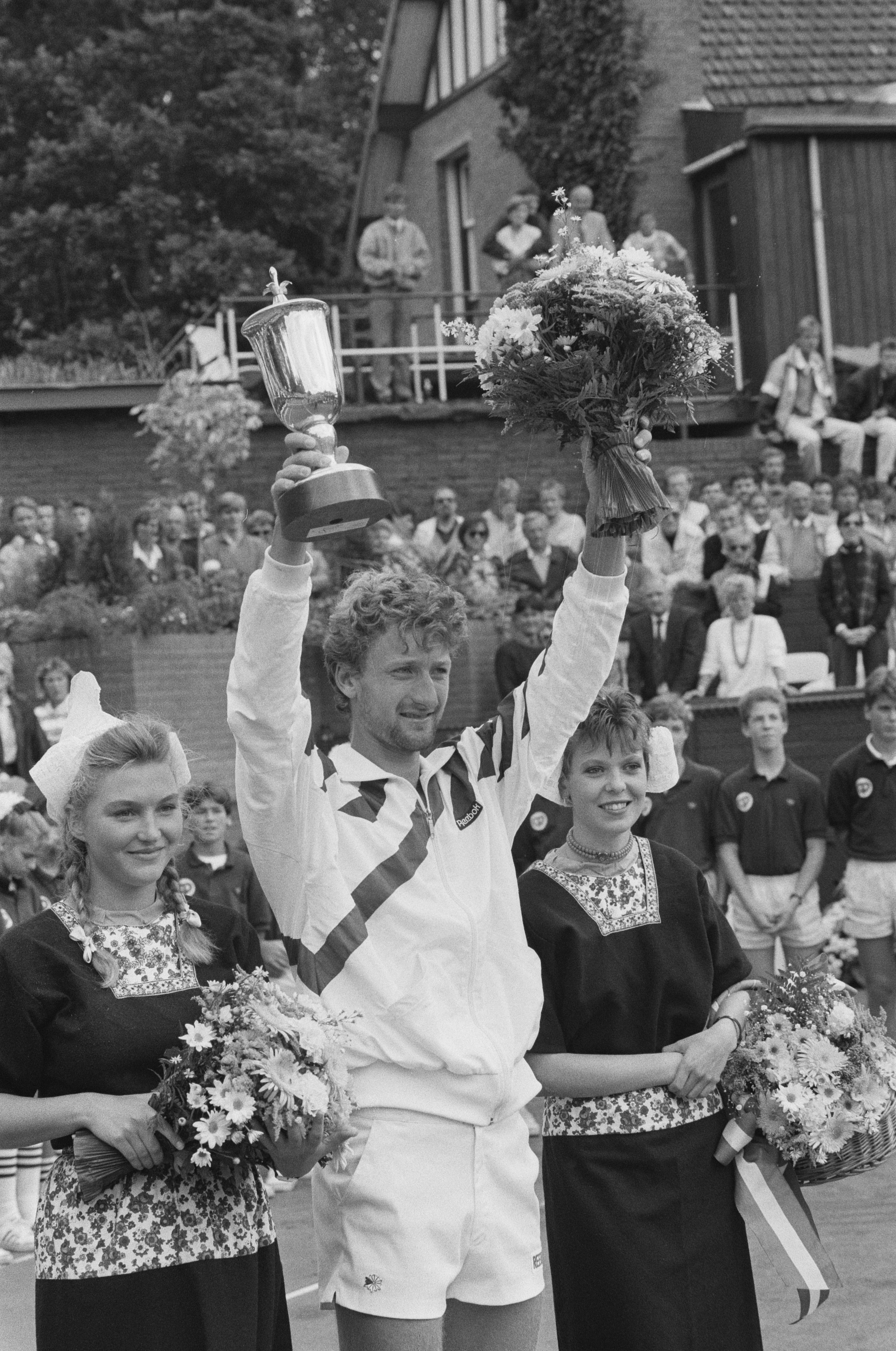
Miloslav Mecir won the singles tournament

=== Singles ===
(Czechoslovakia) Miloslav Mečíř defeated (Argentina) Guillermo Pérez Roldán 6–4, 1–6, 6–3, 6–2

- It was Mečíř's 6th singles title of the year and the 9th of his career.

=== Doubles ===
(Poland) Wojciech Fibak / (Czechoslovakia) Miloslav Mečíř defeated (Netherlands) Tom Nijssen / (Netherlands) Johan Vekemans 7–6, 5–7, 6–2
