= 1983 Lorraine Open – Singles =

Singles
- 1983 Lorraine Open

Final
- Champion: (United States) Nick Saviano
- Runner-up: (United States) Chip Hooper
- Score: 6–4, 4–6, 6–3

Details
- Draw: 32
- Seeds: 8

Events
Singles	Doubles
- Lorraine Open

Erick Iskersky was the defending champion, but lost in the first round to Chip Hooper.

Nick Saviano won the title by defeating Hooper 6–4, 4–6, 6–3 in the final.

== Seeds ==
1. (Poland) Wojciech Fibak (semifinals)
2. (United States) Bill Scanlon (quarterfinals)
3. (United States) Chip Hooper (final)
4. (United States) Tom Gullikson (first round)
5. (United States) Brad Gilbert (first round)
6. (Chile) Jaime Fillol (first round)
7. (Australia) John Fitzgerald (first round)
8. (Sweden) Anders Järryd (first round)

== Draw ==
Key

- Q = Qualifier
- WC = Wild card
- LL = Lucky loser
- Alt = Alternate
- ITF = ITF entry
- PR = Protected ranking
- SR = Special ranking
- SE = Special exempt
- JE = Junior exempt
- JR = Junior Accelerator Programme entrant
- CO = College Accelerator Programme entrant
- NG = Next Gen Accelerator Program entrant
- w/o = Walkover
- r = Retired
- d = Defaulted

=== Finals ===
Semifinals
1	(Poland) Wojciech Fibak	3	5
3	(United States) Chip Hooper	6	7
(South Africa) Danie Visser	6	0	3
(United States) Nick Saviano	3	6	6

Final
3	(United States) Chip Hooper	4	6	3
(United States) Nick Saviano	6	4	6

=== Top half ===
First round
1	(Poland) W Fibak	6	6
(Italy) A Panatta	2	1
Q	(Netherlands) M Schapers	6	7
(Australia) R Frawley	4	5
(United States) V Amaya	6	6	6
(Chile) R Acuña	2	7	3
(Sweden) J Gunnarsson	7	3	6
5	(United States) B Gilbert	5	6	2
3	(United States) C Hooper	6	6	6
(United States) E Iskersky	1	7	3
(West Germany) K Meiler	6	6
(Chile) B Prajoux	4	2
(Australia) W Masur	6	6
(United States) S Giammalva Jr.	3	4
(Romania) I Nastase	6	6
7	(Australia) J Fitzgerald	4	3

Second round
1	(Poland) W Fibak	6	6
Q	(Netherlands) M Schapers	2	2
(United States) V Amaya	3	7	6
(Sweden) J Gunnarsson	6	6	2
3	(United States) C Hooper	6	3	6
(West Germany) K Meiler	4	6	3
(Australia) W Masur	5	7	6
(Romania) I Nastase	7	6	2

Quarterfinals
1	(Poland) W Fibak	6	6	6
(United States) V Amaya	7	3	2
3	(United States) C Hooper	6	1	6
(Australia) W Masur	1	6	4

Semifinals
1	(Poland) W Fibak	3	5
3	(United States) C Hooper	6	7

=== Bottom half ===
First round
8	(Sweden) A Järryd	6	1	1
(South Africa) D Visser	4	6	6
(United States) M Davis	7	3	2
(France) J Potier	6	6	6
(South Africa) F Sauer	5	6	5
(United States) L Bourne	7	4	7
(United States) T Cain	6	3	6
4	(United States) T Gullikson	2	6	4
6	(Chile) J Fillol	6	2
(Republic of Ireland) M Doyle	7	6
(United States) N Saviano	6	6
Q	(Sweden) S Edberg	2	1
Q	(South Africa) T Viljoen	6	6
Q	(South Africa) E Edwards	4	4
(United States) T Moor	4	2
2	(United States) B Scanlon	6	6

Second round
(South Africa) D Visser	7	4	9
(France) J Potier	6	6	7
(United States) L Bourne	1	7	4
(United States) T Cain	6	6	6
(Republic of Ireland) M Doyle	6	3	7
(United States) N Saviano	4	6	9
Q	(South Africa) T Viljoen	4	2
2	(United States) B Scanlon	6	6

Quarterfinals
(South Africa) D Visser	w/o
(United States) T Cain
(United States) N Saviano	2	6	6
2	(United States) B Scanlon	6	3	4

Semifinals
(South Africa) D Visser	6	0	3
(United States) N Saviano	3	6	6
