= 1985 Lorraine Open =

- Date: 18–24 March
- Edition: 7th
- Category: Grand Prix
- Draw: 32S / 16D
- Prize money: $80,000
- Surface: Carpet (i)
- Location: Nancy, France

Champions

Singles
- (United States) Tim Wilkison

Doubles
- (United States) Marcel Freeman / (United States) Rodney Harmon
← 1984 ·	Lorraine Open	· 1986 →

The 1985 Lorraine Open was a men's tennis tournament played on indoor carpet courts in Nancy, France, and was part of the 1985 Nabisco Grand Prix. It was the seventh edition of the tournament and took place from 18 March through 24 March 1985. First-seeded Tim Wilkison won the singles title.

== Finals ==
=== Singles ===
(United States) Tim Wilkison defeated (Socialist Federal Republic of Yugoslavia) Slobodan Živojinović 4–6, 7–6, 9–7

- It was Wilkison's 1st singles title of the year and the 6th and last of his career.

=== Doubles ===
(United States) Marcel Freeman / (United States) Rodney Harmon defeated (Czechoslovakia) Jaroslav Navrátil / (Sweden) Jonas Svensson 6–4, 7–6

== Prize money ==
Event	W	F	SF	QF	Round of 16	Round of 32
Singles	$16,000	$8,000	$4,240	$2,280	$1,240	$680
Doubles*	$4,800	$2,400	$1,328	$832	$552	—

_{*per team}
