= 1979 Lorraine Open =

- Date: 19–25 March
- Edition: 1st
- Category: Grand Prix
- Draw: 32S / 16D
- Prize money: $50,000
- Surface: Carpet (i)
- Location: Nancy, France

Champions

Singles
- (France) Yannick Noah

Doubles
- (West Germany) Klaus Eberhard / (West Germany) Karl Meiler
Lorraine Open	· 1980 →

The 1979 Lorraine Open was a men's tennis tournament played on indoor carpet courts. The event was part of the 1979 Colgate-Palmolive Grand Prix and was played in Nancy in France. It was the inaugural edition of the tournament and was held from 19 March through 25 March 1979. Fourth-seeded Yannick Noah won the singles title.

== Finals ==
=== Singles ===
(France) Yannick Noah defeated (France) Jean-Louis Haillet 6–2, 5–7, 6–1, 7–5

- It was Noah's 1st singles title of the year and the 3rd of his career.

=== Doubles ===
(West Germany) Klaus Eberhard / (West Germany) Karl Meiler defeated (United Kingdom) Robin Drysdale / (United Kingdom) Andrew Jarrett 4–6, 7–6, 6–3
