= 1985 ABN World Tennis Tournament – Doubles =

Doubles
- 1985 ABN World Tennis Tournament

Final
- Champions: (Czechoslovakia) Pavel Složil (Czechoslovakia) Tomáš Šmíd
- Runners-up: (United States) Vitas Gerulaitis (Australia) Paul McNamee
- Score: 6–4, 6–4

Details
- Draw: 16 (1WC)
- Seeds: 4

Events
Singles	Doubles
← 1984 ·	Rotterdam Open	· 1986 →

Kevin Curren and Wojciech Fibak were the defending champions, but Curren did not compete this year. Fibak teamed up with Heinz Günthardt and lost in the quarterfinals to Vitas Gerulaitis and Paul McNamee.

Pavel Složil and Tomáš Šmíd won the title by defeating Gerulaitis and McNamee 6–4, 6–4 in the final.

== Seeds ==
1. (Czechoslovakia) Pavel Složil / (Czechoslovakia) Tomáš Šmíd (champions)
2. (Sweden) Stefan Edberg / (Sweden) Anders Järryd (first round, withdrew)
3. (Australia) Mark Edmondson / (Australia) Kim Warwick (first round)
4. (Poland) Wojciech Fibak / (Switzerland) Heinz Günthardt (quarterfinals)

== Draw ==
=== Key ===
- Q = Qualifier
- WC = Wild card
- LL = Lucky loser
- Alt = Alternate
- SE = Special exempt
- PR = Protected ranking
- ITF = ITF entry
- JE = Junior exempt
- w/o = Walkover
- r = Retired
- d = Defaulted
- SR = Special ranking

=== Draw ===
First round
1	(Czechoslovakia) P Složil (Czechoslovakia) T Šmíd	7	7
(Australia) B Dyke (Australia) L Warder	5	6
(Sweden) P Hjertquist (Netherlands) H van Boeckel	2	5
(Paraguay) F González (United States) M Mitchell	6	7
3	(Australia) M Edmondson (Australia) K Warwick	6	5	3
(Sweden) J Nyström (Sweden) M Wilander	3	7	6
(West Germany) A Maurer (West Germany) W Popp	2	6	2
(Switzerland) M Günthardt (Hungary) Z Kuhárszky	6	3	6
(Sweden) J Gunnarsson (Denmark) M Mortensen	4	6
(United States) V Gerulaitis (Australia) P McNamee	6	7
(Switzerland) J Hlasek (Netherlands) M Schapers	2	4
4	(Poland) W Fibak (Switzerland) H Günthardt	6	6
(India) V Amritraj (West Germany) B Becker	6	6	6
WC	(India) R Krishnan (Socialist Federal Republic of Yugoslavia) M Ostoja	7	2	2
(Australia) D Graham (United States) S Meister	w/o
2	(Sweden) S Edberg (Sweden) A Järryd

Quarterfinals
1	(Czechoslovakia) P Složil (Czechoslovakia) T Šmíd	7	6
(Paraguay) F González (United States) M Mitchell	6	3
(Sweden) J Nyström (Sweden) M Wilander	6	3	6
(Switzerland) M Günthardt (Hungary) Z Kuhárszky	2	6	2
(United States) V Gerulaitis (Australia) P McNamee	3	6	6
4	(Poland) W Fibak (Switzerland) H Günthardt	6	4	4
(India) V Amritraj (West Germany) B Becker	7	6
(Australia) D Graham (United States) S Meister	5	4

Semifinals
1	(Czechoslovakia) P Složil (Czechoslovakia) T Šmíd	6	6
(Sweden) J Nyström (Sweden) M Wilander	2	4
(United States) V Gerulaitis (Australia) P McNamee	7	7
(India) V Amritraj (West Germany) B Becker	6	6

Final
1	(Czechoslovakia) P Složil (Czechoslovakia) T Šmíd	6	6
(United States) V Gerulaitis (Australia) P McNamee	4	4
