= 1985 ABN World Tennis Tournament – Singles =

Singles
- 1985 ABN World Tennis Tournament

Final
- Champion: (Czechoslovakia) Miloslav Mečíř
- Runner-up: (Switzerland) Jakob Hlasek
- Score: 6–1, 6–2

Details
- Draw: 32
- Seeds: 8

Events
Singles	Doubles
← 1984 ·	ABN World Tennis Tournament	· 1986 →

Unseeded Miloslav Mečíř won the singles title at the ABN World Tennis Tournament, after a 6–1, 6–2 win in the final against Jakob Hlasek, who was also unseeded.

== Seeds ==
1. (Sweden) Mats Wilander (second round)
2. (Sweden) Anders Järryd (second round)
3. (Australia) Pat Cash (quarterfinals)
4. (Sweden) Stefan Edberg (first round)
5. (Sweden) Joakim Nyström (semifinals)
6. (Czechoslovakia) Tomáš Šmíd (semifinals)
7. (United States) Vitas Gerulaitis (first round)
8. (India) Ramesh Krishnan (second round)

== Draw ==
=== Finals ===
Semifinals
6	(Czechoslovakia) Tomáš Šmíd	3	7	3
(Switzerland) Jakob Hlasek	6	6	6
5	(Sweden) Joakim Nyström	3	3
(Czechoslovakia) Miloslav Mečíř	6	6

Final
(Switzerland) Jakob Hlasek	1	2
(Czechoslovakia) Miloslav Mečíř	6	6

=== Upper half ===
First round
1	(Sweden) Mats Wilander	7	6
(United Kingdom) John Lloyd	6	2
WC	(Poland) Wojtek Fibak	6	6
(United States) John Sadri	7	7
Q	(United Kingdom) Stuart Bale	7	6
(France) Guy Forget	6	2
(Switzerland) Heinz Günthardt	1	6
6	(Czechoslovakia) Tomáš Šmíd	6	7
4	(Sweden) Stefan Edberg	2	7	2
(Paraguay) Francisco González	6	6	6
(Czechoslovakia) Pavel Složil	6	6
(Australia) Trevor Allan	0	2
(West Germany) Andreas Maurer	6	6
(Switzerland) Jakob Hlasek	7	7
(Hungary) Zoltan Kuharszky	6	6	1
8	(India) Ramesh Krishnan	0	7	6

Second round
1	(Sweden) Mats Wilander	3	6	3
(United States) John Sadri	6	2	6
(United Kingdom) Stuart Bale	4	2
6	(Czechoslovakia) Tomáš Šmíd	6	6
(Paraguay) Francisco González	6	7
(Czechoslovakia) Pavel Složil	2	5
(Switzerland) Jakob Hlasek	7	7
8	(India) Ramesh Krishnan	5	5

Quarterfinals
(United States) John Sadri	1	3
6	(Czechoslovakia) Tomáš Šmíd	6	6
(Paraguay) Francisco González	2	6	4
(Switzerland) Jakob Hlasek	6	4	6

Semifinals
6	(Czechoslovakia) Tomáš Šmíd	3	7	3
(Switzerland) Jakob Hlasek	6	6	6

=== Lower half ===
First round
5	(Sweden) Joakim Nyström	6	6
(United States) Steve Meister	0	1
(United States) Matt Mitchell	3	7	5
(Sweden) Jan Gunnarsson	6	5	7
(Australia) Broderick Dyke	5	3
WC	(Netherlands) Huub van Boeckel	7	6
Q	(Australia) Kim Warwick	1	5
3	(Australia) Pat Cash	6	7
7	(United States) Vitas Gerulaitis	2	6	6
(West Germany) Boris Becker	6	4	7
(United States) Bob Green	6	7
WC	(Netherlands) Michiel Schapers	4	6
(Australia) Paul McNamee	7	1	1
(Czechoslovakia) Miloslav Mečíř	5	6	6
(India) Vijay Amritraj	4	3
2	(Sweden) Anders Järryd	6	6

Second round
5	(Sweden) Joakim Nyström	6	6
(Sweden) Jan Gunnarsson	3	1
(Netherlands) Huub van Boeckel	2	1
3	(Australia) Pat Cash	6	6
(West Germany) Boris Becker	7	6
(United States) Bob Green	6	0
(Czechoslovakia) Miloslav Mečíř	6	7
2	(Sweden) Anders Järryd	2	6

Quarterfinals
5	(Sweden) Joakim Nyström	2	6	7
3	(Australia) Pat Cash	6	3	6
(West Germany) Boris Becker	4	2
(Czechoslovakia) Miloslav Mečíř	6	6

Semifinals
5	(Sweden) Joakim Nyström	3	3
(Czechoslovakia) Miloslav Mečíř	6	6
