= 1987 Dutch Open – Doubles =

Doubles
- 1987 Dutch Open

Final
- Champions: (Poland) Wojciech Fibak (Czechoslovakia) Miloslav Mečíř
- Runners-up: (Netherlands) Tom Nijssen (Netherlands) Johan Vekemans
- Score: 7–6, 5–7, 6–2

Details
- Draw: 16 (1WC/1Alt)
- Seeds: 4

Events
Singles	Doubles
- Dutch Open

Miloslav Mečíř and Tomáš Šmíd were the defending champions, but Šmíd did not compete this year.

Mečíř teamed up with Wojciech Fibak and successfully defended his title, by defeating Tom Nijssen and Johan Vekemans 7–6, 5–7, 6–2 in the final.

== Seeds ==
1. (Poland) Wojciech Fibak / (Czechoslovakia) Miloslav Mečíř (champions)
2. (Switzerland) Jakob Hlasek / (Switzerland) Claudio Mezzadri (first round)
3. (Australia) Carl Limberger / (Australia) Mark Woodforde (semifinals)
4. (Netherlands) Tom Nijssen / (Netherlands) Johan Vekemans (final)

== Draw ==
Key

- Q = Qualifier
- WC = Wild card
- LL = Lucky loser
- Alt = Alternate
- ITF = ITF entry
- PR = Protected ranking
- SR = Special ranking
- SE = Special exempt
- JE = Junior exempt
- JR = Junior Accelerator Programme entrant
- CO = College Accelerator Programme entrant
- NG = Next Gen Accelerator Program entrant
- w/o = Walkover
- r = Retired
- d = Defaulted

=== Draw ===
First round
1	(Poland) W Fibak (Czechoslovakia) M Mečíř	6	7
(Spain) D de Miguel (West Germany) H Rittersbacher	1	6
(West Germany) A Hornung (South Africa) F Sauer	7	3	5
(West Germany) A Mronz (West Germany) K Saniter	6	6	7
3	(Australia) C Limberger (Australia) M Woodforde	6	6
Alt	(Zimbabwe) H Ismail (United States) Greg Neuhart	4	1
(West Germany) A Maurer (West Germany) CU Steeb	3	7	2
(Czechoslovakia) S Birner (Australia) B Dyke	6	6	6
4	(Netherlands) T Nijssen (Netherlands) J Vekemans	7	4	6
WC	(Czechoslovakia) K Nováček (Czechoslovakia) L Pimek	5	6	2
(India) A Amritraj (Australia) R Barlow	3	5
(Spain) J López-Maeso (Spain) A Tous	6	7
(West Germany) R Osterthun (Austria) H Skoff	3	4
(Austria) A Antonitsch (Austria) T Muster	6	6
(Argentina) E Bengoechea (France) JP Fleurian	2	7	6
2	(Switzerland) J Hlasek (Switzerland) C Mezzadri	6	5	4

Quarterfinals
1	(Poland) W Fibak (Czechoslovakia) M Mečíř	4	6	6
(West Germany) A Mronz (West Germany) K Saniter	6	0	1
3	(Australia) C Limberger (Australia) M Woodforde	6	6
(Czechoslovakia) S Birner (Australia) B Dyke	4	3
4	(Netherlands) T Nijssen (Netherlands) J Vekemans	7	6	6
(Spain) J López-Maeso (Spain) A Tous	5	7	4
(Austria) A Antonitsch (Austria) T Muster	6	5	7
(Argentina) E Bengoechea (France) JP Fleurian	4	7	6

Semifinals
1	(Poland) W Fibak (Czechoslovakia) M Mečíř	6	6
3	(Australia) C Limberger (Australia) M Woodforde	3	4
4	(Netherlands) T Nijssen (Netherlands) J Vekemans	7	4	6
(Austria) A Antonitsch (Austria) T Muster	5	6	3

Final
1	(Poland) W Fibak (Czechoslovakia) M Mečíř	7	5	6
4	(Netherlands) T Nijssen (Netherlands) J Vekemans	6	7	2
