= 1981 Lorraine Open =

- Date: 16–22 March 1981
- Edition: 3rd
- Category: Grand Prix
- Draw: 32S / 16D
- Prize money: $50,000
- Surface: Carpet (i)
- Location: Nancy, France

Champions

Singles
- (Czechoslovakia) Pavel Složil

Doubles
- (Romania) Ilie Năstase / (Italy) Adriano Panatta
← 1980 ·	Lorraine Open	· 1982 →

The 1981 Lorraine Open was a men's tennis tournament played on Indoor carpet courts. The event was part of the 1981 Volvo Grand Prix and was played in Nancy in France. It was the third edition of the tournament and was held from 16 March through 22 March 1981. Seventh-seeded Pavel Složil won the singles title.

== Finals ==
=== Singles ===
(Czechoslovakia) Pavel Složil defeated (Romania) Ilie Năstase 6–2, 7–5

- It was Složil's first singles title of his career.

=== Doubles ===
(Romania) Ilie Năstase / (Italy) Adriano Panatta defeated (United Kingdom) John Feaver / (Czechoslovakia) Jiří Hřebec 6–4, 2–6, 6–4
