= 1987 WCT Finals =

- Date: April 7–13
- Edition: 17th
- Draw: 8S
- Prize money: $500,000
- Surface: Carpet / indoor
- Location: Dallas, Texas, United States
- Venue: Reunion Arena

Champions

Singles
- (Czechoslovakia) Miloslav Mečíř
- WCT Finals

The 1987 WCT Finals was a season-ending men's tennis tournament played on indoor carpet courts. It was the 17th edition of the WCT Finals and was part of the 1987 Nabisco Grand Prix. It was played at the Reunion Arena in Dallas, Texas in the United States from April 7 through April 13, 1987. The best eight players on the Grand Prix circuit qualified for the tournament. Winners of a Grand Slam tournament automatically qualified. Unseeded Miloslav Mečíř won the title.

== Final ==
=== Singles ===
(Czechoslovakia) Miloslav Mečíř defeated (United States) John McEnroe 6–0, 3–6, 6–2, 6–2

- It was Mečíř's 4th singles title of the year and the 7th of his career.
