= 1983 Lorraine Open =

- Date: 7–13 March
- Edition: 5th
- Category: Grand Prix
- Draw: 32S / 16D
- Prize money: $75,000
- Surface: Carpet (i)
- Location: Nancy, France

Champions

Singles
- (United States) Nick Saviano

Doubles
- (Sweden) Jan Gunnarsson / (Sweden) Anders Järryd
← 1982 ·	Lorraine Open	· 1984 →

The 1983 Lorraine Open was a men's tennis tournament played on indoor carpet courts. The event was part of the 1983 Volvo Grand Prix and was played in Nancy in France. It was the fifth edition of the tournament and took place from 7 March through 13 March 1983. Unseeded Nick Saviano won the singles title.

== Finals ==
=== Singles ===
(United States) Nick Saviano defeated (United States) Chip Hooper 6–4, 4–6, 6-3

- It was Saviano's only singles title of his career.

=== Doubles ===
(Sweden) Jan Gunnarsson / (Sweden) Anders Järryd defeated (Chile) Ricardo Acuña / (Chile) Belus Prajoux 7–5, 6–3
