= 1987 Dutch Open – Singles =

Singles
- 1987 Dutch Open

Final
- Champion: (Czechoslovakia) Miloslav Mečíř
- Runner-up: (Argentina) Guillermo Pérez Roldán
- Score: 6–4, 1–6, 6–3, 6–2

Details
- Draw: 32 (3WC/4Q)
- Seeds: 8

Events
Singles	Doubles
- Dutch Open

Thomas Muster was the defending champion, but lost in the quarterfinals to Guillermo Pérez Roldán.

Miloslav Mečíř won the title by defeating Pérez Roldán 6–4, 1–6, 6–3, 6–2 in the final.

== Seeds ==
1. (Czechoslovakia) Miloslav Mečíř (champion)
2. (Argentina) Martín Jaite (semifinals)
3. (Switzerland) Jakob Hlasek (first round)
4. (Czechoslovakia) Karel Nováček (first round)
5. (Argentina) Guillermo Pérez Roldán (final)
6. (Argentina) Eduardo Bengoechea (semifinals)
7. (Austria) Horst Skoff (quarterfinals)
8. (Soviet Union) Andrei Chesnokov (quarterfinals)

== Draw ==
Key

- Q = Qualifier
- WC = Wild card
- LL = Lucky loser
- Alt = Alternate
- ITF = ITF entry
- PR = Protected ranking
- SR = Special ranking
- SE = Special exempt
- JE = Junior exempt
- JR = Junior Accelerator Programme entrant
- CO = College Accelerator Programme entrant
- NG = Next Gen Accelerator Program entrant
- w/o = Walkover
- r = Retired
- d = Defaulted

=== Finals ===
Semifinals
1	(Czechoslovakia) Miloslav Mečíř	6	7
6	(Argentina) Eduardo Bengoechea	1	5
5	(Argentina) Guillermo Pérez Roldán	3	7	7
2	(Argentina) Martín Jaite	6	5	6

Final
1	(Czechoslovakia) Miloslav Mečíř	6	1	6	6
5	(Argentina) Guillermo Pérez Roldán	4	6	3	2

=== Top half ===
First round
1	(Czechoslovakia) M Mečíř	6	4	6
(Argentina) F Davín	3	6	2
Q	(Czechoslovakia) S Birner	3	4
(West Germany) R Osterthun	6	6
(Spain) D de Miguel	6	6	2
WC	(Netherlands) M Oosting	4	7	6
(Czechoslovakia) L Pimek	2	3
7	(Austria) H Skoff	6	6
4	(Czechoslovakia) K Nováček	1	6	1
(West Germany) CU Steeb	6	4	6
(Spain) A Tous	7	6
(Argentina) R Argüello	5	2
(Spain) J Arrese	6	5	6
Q	(Spain) J López-Maeso	2	7	3
(Italy) C Aprili	4	6
6	(Argentina) E Bengoechea	6	7

Second round
1	(Czechoslovakia) M Mečíř	4	6	6
(West Germany) R Osterthun	6	3	4
WC	(Netherlands) M Oosting	2	6
7	(Austria) H Skoff	6	7
(West Germany) CU Steeb	6	6
(Spain) A Tous	2	2
(Spain) J Arrese	7	4	2
6	(Argentina) E Bengoechea	6	6	6

Quarterfinals
1	(Czechoslovakia) M Mečíř	7	6
7	(Austria) H Skoff	5	2
(West Germany) CU Steeb	6	6	2
6	(Argentina) E Bengoechea	3	7	6

Semifinals
1	(Czechoslovakia) M Mečíř	6	7
6	(Argentina) E Bengoechea	1	5

=== Bottom half ===
First round
5	(Argentina) G Pérez Roldán	6	6
(Australia) C Limberger	1	1
(West Germany) A Maurer	6	6
(France) JP Fleurian	4	2
Q	(West Germany) H Schwaier	2	6	3
(Netherlands) M Schapers	6	3	1^{r}
(Austria) T Muster	6	0	7
3	(Switzerland) J Hlasek	1	6	6
8/WC	(Soviet Union) A Chesnokov	6	6
Q	(Australia) M Woodforde	3	3
(Switzerland) R Stadler	6	2
(Switzerland) C Mezzadri	7	6
(Australia) B Dyke	6	3	1
WC	(Netherlands) T Nijssen	2	6	6
(Australia) P McNamee	4	0
2	(Argentina) M Jaite	6	6

Second round
5	(Argentina) G Pérez Roldán	6	7	7
(West Germany) A Maurer	7	6	6
Q	(West Germany) H Schwaier	6	3
(Austria) T Muster	7	6
8/WC	(Soviet Union) A Chesnokov	w/o
(Switzerland) C Mezzadri
WC	(Netherlands) T Nijssen	6	0
2	(Argentina) M Jaite	7	6

Quarterfinals
5	(Argentina) G Pérez Roldán	7	1	6
(Austria) T Muster	6	6	1
8/WC	(Soviet Union) A Chesnokov	2	4
2	(Argentina) M Jaite	6	6

Semifinals
5	(Argentina) G Pérez Roldán	3	7	7
2	(Argentina) M Jaite	6	5	6
