= 1987 World Championship Tennis Finals – Singles =

Singles
- 1987 WCT Finals

Final
- Champion: (Czechoslovakia) Miloslav Mečíř
- Runner-up: (United States) John McEnroe
- Score: 6–0, 3–6, 6–2, 6–2

Details
- Draw: 8
- Seeds: 4

Events
Singles
- WCT Finals

Anders Järryd was the defending champion but did not compete that year.

Miloslav Mečíř won in the final 6–0, 3–6, 6–2, 6–2 against John McEnroe.

== Seeds ==
A champion seed is indicated in bold text while text in italics indicates the round in which that seed was eliminated.

1. (West Germany) ~~Boris Becker~~ (withdrew)
2. (Sweden) Stefan Edberg (semifinals)
3. (United States) John McEnroe (final)
4. (Sweden) Mats Wilander (quarterfinals)

== Draw ==
Key

- Q = Qualifier
- WC = Wild card
- LL = Lucky loser
- Alt = Alternate
- ITF = ITF entry
- PR = Protected ranking
- SR = Special ranking
- SE = Special exempt
- JE = Junior exempt
- JR = Junior Accelerator Programme entrant
- CO = College Accelerator Programme entrant
- NG = Next Gen Accelerator Program entrant
- w/o = Walkover
- r = Retired
- d = Defaulted

Quarterfinals
LL	(United States) Kevin Curren	**7**	6	**7**	4	2
(Ecuador) **Andrés Gómez**	6	**7**	6	**6**	**6**
4	(Sweden) Mats Wilander	1	1	3
(Czechoslovakia) **Miloslav Mečíř**	**6**	**6**	**6**
(France) Yannick Noah	6	2	**6**	3
3	(United States) **John McEnroe**	**7**	**6**	4	**6**
(United States) Tim Mayotte	2	5	**7**	**6**	1
2	(Sweden) **Stefan Edberg**	**6**	**7**	6	3	**6**

Semifinals
(Ecuador) Andrés Gómez	**7**	6	4	2
(Czechoslovakia) **Miloslav Mečíř**	6	**7**	**6**	**6**
3	(United States) **John McEnroe**	**7**	6	**7**	**6**
2	(Sweden) Stefan Edberg	6	**7**	6	4

Final
(Czechoslovakia) **Miloslav Mečíř**	**6**	3	**6**	**6**
3	(United States) John McEnroe	0	**6**	2	2
