= Johan Carlsson (tennis) =

Swedish tennis player

- Country (sports): Sweden
- Born: 29 January 1966 (age 59); Linköping, Sweden
- Height: 1.83 m (6 ft 0 in)
- Turned pro: 1984
- Plays: Right-handed
- Prize money: $335,509

Singles
- Career record: 55–77
- Career titles: 0
- Highest ranking: No. 81 (22 Jun 1987)

Grand Slam singles results
- Australian Open: 2R (1987)
- French Open: 1R (1987, 1989)
- Wimbledon: 1R (1987, 1989)
- US Open: 3R (1988)

Doubles
- Career record: 15–34
- Career titles: 0
- Highest ranking: No. 155 (7 Jul 86)

Grand Slam doubles results
- Australian Open: 1R (1987)

Johan Carlsson (born 29 January 1966) is a former professional tennis player from Sweden.

== Career ==
Carlsson reached his first and only final on tour in the 1986 Japan Open, finishing runner-up. His previous best performance had come at the same tournament a year earlier, when he made the semi-finals. In 1986 he was also a quarter-finalist at Washington

He defeated both Slobodan Živojinović and countryman Tobias Svantesson in the 1988 US Open, to make the third round, where he was knocked out of the tournament by Stefan Edberg. It was his best showing in a Grand Slam.

In 1989 he made the quarter-finals at Nancy and along the way defeated top seed Darren Cahill.

Carlsson reached two further quarter-finals in 1991, in Tel Aviv and Washington.

He had wins over two top 20 players during his career. At Key Biscayne in 1987 he upset world number 13 Mikael Pernfors and in the 1992 Cincinnati Open he defeated local MaliVai Washington, then ranked 16th in the world.

== Grand Prix career finals ==
Result	W/L	Date	Tournament	Surface	Opponent	Score
Loss	0–1	Oct 1986	Tokyo, Japan	Hard	(India) Ramesh Krishnan	3–6, 1–6

== Challenger titles ==
=== Doubles: (3) ===
No.	Year	Tournament	Surface	Partner	Opponents	Score
1.	1984	Travemünde, West Germany	Clay	(Sweden) Peter Svensson	(Socialist Federal Republic of Yugoslavia) Igor Flego (Israel) Shahar Perkiss	5–7, 6–4, 6–2
2.	1990	Nagoya, Japan	Hard	(New Zealand) David Lewis	(Japan) Shuzo Matsuoka (Japan) Shigeru Ota	7–5, 6–2
3.	1991	Salzburg, Austria	Clay	(Sweden) David Engel	(New Zealand) Bruce Derlin (Germany) Martin Sinner	7–6, 6–2
