= 1985 Dutch Open – Singles =

Singles
- 1985 Dutch Open

Final
- Champion: (West Germany) Ricki Osterthun
- Runner-up: (Sweden) Kent Carlsson
- Score: 4–6, 4–6, 6–4, 6–2, 6–3

Details
- Draw: 32 (3WC/4Q)
- Seeds: 8

Events
Singles	Doubles
← 1984 ·	Dutch Open	· 1986 →

Anders Järryd was the defending champion, but decided to rest in order to compete at the Davis Cup the following week.

Ricki Osterthun won the title by defeating Kent Carlsson 4–6, 4–6, 6–4, 6–2, 6–3 in the final. The match was briefly interrupted by rain after the end of the third set.

== Seeds ==
1. (Sweden) Henrik Sundström (second round)
2. (Czechoslovakia) Tomáš Šmíd (quarterfinals)
3. (West Germany) Andreas Maurer (semifinals)
4. (France) Tarik Benhabiles (first round)
5. (Spain) Sergio Casal (second round)
6. (Sweden) Jonas Svensson (first round)
7. (Ecuador) Raúl Viver (first round)
8. (Brazil) Givaldo Barbosa (second round)

== Draw ==
=== Key ===
- Q = Qualifier
- WC = Wild card
- LL = Lucky loser
- Alt = Alternate
- SE = Special exempt
- PR = Protected ranking
- ITF = ITF entry
- JE = Junior exempt
- w/o = Walkover
- r = Retired
- d = Defaulted
- SR = Special ranking

=== Finals ===
Semifinals
WC	(Netherlands) Menno Oosting	1	4
(Sweden) Kent Carlsson	6	6
3	(West Germany) Andreas Maurer	6	6	4
(West Germany) Ricki Osterthun	3	7	6

Final
(Sweden) Kent Carlsson	6	6	4	2	3
(West Germany) Ricki Osterthun	4	4	6	6	6

=== Top half ===
First round
1	(Sweden) H Sundström	7	7
(Australia) S Youl	5	5
(Netherlands) M Schapers	6	6
(Hungary) Z Kuhárszky	4	3
(United States) E Adams	4	2
WC	(Netherlands) M Oosting	6	6
(Italy) M Cierro	6	6
6	(Sweden) J Svensson	2	2
4	(France) T Benhabiles	6	1	4
(Sweden) K Carlsson	3	6	6
(Australia) C Limberger	6	6
(Brazil) I Kley	1	3
Q	(Australia) D Cahill	6	4	6
(France) T Allan	1	6	3
Q	(Socialist Federal Republic of Yugoslavia) G Prpić	6	4	6
7	(Ecuador) R Viver	1	6	4

Second round
1	(Sweden) H Sundström	6	4	4
(Netherlands) M Schapers	2	6	6
WC	(Netherlands) M Oosting	6	6
(Italy) M Cierro	3	4
(Sweden) K Carlsson	4	6	6
(Australia) C Limberger	6	2	1
Q	(Australia) D Cahill	6	3	6
Q	(Socialist Federal Republic of Yugoslavia) G Prpić	3	6	3

Quarterfinals
(Netherlands) M Schapers	4	6	2
WC	(Netherlands) M Oosting	6	4	6
(Sweden) K Carlsson	6	6
Q	(Australia) D Cahill	2	2

Semifinals
WC	(Netherlands) M Oosting	1	4
(Sweden) K Carlsson	6	6

=== Bottom half ===
First round
8	(Brazil) G Barbosa	6	6
(Argentina) G Rivas	4	4
(Spain) E Sánchez	6	4	3
(Netherlands) H van Boeckel	4	6	6
(Argentina) C Miniussi	2	1
(Italy) A de Minicis	6	6
WC	(Netherlands) Christian Feenstra	1	1
3	(West Germany) A Maurer	6	6
5	(Spain) S Casal	6	5	6
(West Germany) D Keretić	4	7	4
Q	(West Germany) E Jelen	5	5
(West Germany) R Osterthun	7	7
(Sweden) S Simonsson	4	4
WC	(Switzerland) C Mezzadri	6	6
Q	(Brazil) F Roese	4	1
2	(Czechoslovakia) T Šmíd	6	6

Second round
8	(Brazil) G Barbosa	4	6	4
(Netherlands) H van Boeckel	6	4	6
(Italy) A de Minicis	4	6	5
3	(West Germany) A Maurer	6	2	7
5	(Spain) S Casal	5	3
(West Germany) R Osterthun	7	6
WC	(Switzerland) C Mezzadri	3	3
2	(Czechoslovakia) T Šmíd	6	6

Quarterfinals
(Netherlands) H van Boeckel	1	1
3	(West Germany) A Maurer	6	6
(West Germany) R Osterthun	6	6
2	(Czechoslovakia) T Šmíd	4	2

Semifinals
3	(West Germany) A Maurer	6	6	4
(West Germany) R Osterthun	3	7	6
