= 1986 ABN World Tennis Tournament =

- Date: 24–30 March
- Edition: 14th
- Category: Grand Prix circuit
- Draw: 32S / 16D
- Prize money: $250,000
- Surface: Carpet / indoor
- Location: Rotterdam, Netherlands
- Venue: Rotterdam Ahoy

Champions

Singles
- (Sweden) Joakim Nyström

Doubles
- (Sweden) Stefan Edberg / (Socialist Federal Republic of Yugoslavia) Slobodan Živojinović
- ABN World Tennis Tournament

The 1986 ABN World Tennis Tournament was a men's tennis tournament played on indoor carpet courts at Rotterdam Ahoy in the Netherlands that was part of the 1986 Nabisco Grand Prix. It was the 14th edition of the tournament and was held from 24 March through 30 March 1986. Fourth-seeded Joakim Nyström won the singles title.

== Finals ==
=== Singles ===
(Sweden) Joakim Nyström defeated (Sweden) Anders Järryd 6–0, 6–3

=== Doubles ===
(Sweden) Stefan Edberg / (Socialist Federal Republic of Yugoslavia) Slobodan Živojinović defeated (Poland) Wojciech Fibak / (United States) Matt Mitchell 2–6, 6–3, 6–2
