= 1986 ABN World Tennis Tournament – Singles =

Singles
- 1986 ABN World Tennis Tournament

Final
- Champion: (Sweden) Joakim Nyström
- Runner-up: (Sweden) Anders Järryd
- Score: 6–0, 6–3

Details
- Draw: 32
- Seeds: 7

Events
Singles	Doubles
- ABN World Tennis Tournament

Miloslav Mečíř was the defending champion of the singles event at the ABN World Tennis Tournament but lost in the first round. Third-seeded Joakim Nyström won the singles title after a 6–1, 6–2 win in the final against fourth-seeded Anders Järryd.

== Seeds ==
1. (Sweden) Mats Wilander (second round)
2. (Sweden) Stefan Edberg (quarterfinals)
3. (Sweden) Joakim Nyström (champion)
4. (Sweden) Anders Järryd (final)
5. (Czechoslovakia) Miloslav Mečíř (first round)
6. NA
7. (Czechoslovakia) Tomáš Šmíd (quarterfinals)
8. (Switzerland) Jakob Hlasek (second round)

== Draw ==
=== Finals ===
Semifinals
Q	(West Germany) Eric Jelen	4	1
4	(Sweden) Anders Järryd	6	6
3	(Sweden) Joakim Nyström	6	6
(France) Guy Forget	2	2

Final
4	(Sweden) Anders Järryd]	0	3
3	(Sweden) Joakim Nyström	6	6

=== Upper half ===
First round
1	(Sweden) Mats Wilander	6	6	7
(Czechoslovakia) Milan Šrejber	2	7	6
(United States) Mark Dickson	6	3	0
Q	(West Germany) Eric Jelen	3	6	6
(Spain) Sergio Casal	4	6	6
(India) Vijay Amritraj	6	4	7
Q	(Czechoslovakia) Pavel Složil	3	6	6
7	(Czechoslovakia) Tomáš Šmíd	6	3	7
4	(Sweden) Anders Järryd	6	6
(United States) Jonathan Canter	2	2
(Sweden) Jan Gunnarsson	2	4
(Switzerland) Heinz Günthardt	6	6
(Spain) Emilio Sánchez	3	6	6
SE	(Australia) Broderick Dyke	6	4	3
(Sweden) Peter Lundgren	7	6
LL	(United States) Matt Mitchell	5	1

Second round
1	(Sweden) Mats Wilander	4	2
Q	(West Germany) Eric Jelen	6	6
(India) Vijay Amritraj	4	6
7	(Czechoslovakia) Tomáš Šmíd	6	7
4	(Sweden) Anders Järryd	6	6
(Switzerland) Heinz Günthardt	3	4
(Spain) Emilio Sánchez	6	6
(Sweden) Peter Lundgren	1	2

Quarterfinals
Q	(West Germany) Eric Jelen	7	7
7	(Czechoslovakia) Tomáš Šmíd	6	5
4	(Sweden) Anders Järryd	6	6
(Spain) Emilio Sánchez	2	0

Semifinals
Q	(West Germany) Eric Jelen	4	1
4	(Sweden) Anders Järryd	6	6

=== Lower half ===
First round
5	(Czechoslovakia) Miloslav Mečíř	4	6
(Poland) Wojtek Fibak	6	7
(West Germany) Andreas Maurer	3	6	3
(Czechoslovakia) Libor Pimek	6	3	6
(Czechoslovakia) Marián Vajda	7	6	5
(United States) Brian Teacher	6	7	7
Q	(Israel) Amos Mansdorf	2	6	2
3	(Sweden) Joakim Nyström	6	4	6
8	(Switzerland) Jakob Hlasek	7	6
(Socialist Federal Republic of Yugoslavia) Slobodan Živojinović	6	2
(France) Guy Forget	6	6
Q	(West Germany) Wolfgang Popp	4	3
WC	(Netherlands) Michiel Schapers	6	6
WC	(United States) Bill Scanlon	3	3
(Spain) Juan Aguilera	1	2
2	(Sweden) Stefan Edberg	6	6

Second round
(Poland) Wojtek Fibak	7	6
(Czechoslovakia) Libor Pimek	5	3
(United States) Brian Teacher	3	5
3	(Sweden) Joakim Nyström	6	7
8	(Switzerland) Jakob Hlasek	4	6	3
(France) Guy Forget	6	1	6
(Netherlands) Michiel Schapers	6	2	6
2	(Sweden) Stefan Edberg	4	6	7

Quarterfinals
(Poland) Wojtek Fibak	0	1
3	(Sweden) Joakim Nyström	6	6
(France) Guy Forget	6	5	6
2	(Sweden) Stefan Edberg	4	7	4

Semifinals
3	(Sweden) Joakim Nyström	6	6
(France) Guy Forget	2	2
