= 1985 Dutch Open – Doubles =

Doubles
- 1985 Dutch Open

Final
- Champions: (Sweden) Hans Simonsson (Sweden) Stefan Simonsson
- Runners-up: (Australia) Carl Limberger (Australia) Mark Woodforde
- Score: 6–3, 6–4

Details
- Draw: 16
- Seeds: 4

Events
Singles	Doubles
- Dutch Open

Anders Järryd and Tomáš Šmíd were the defending champions, but Järryd decided to rest in order to compete at the Davis Cup the following week. Šmíd teamed up with Andreas Maurer and lost in the quarterfinals to Carl Limberger and Mark Woodforde.

Hans Simonsson and Stefan Simonsson won the title by defeating Limberger and Woodforde 6–3, 6–4 in the final.

== Seeds ==
1. (West Germany) Andreas Maurer / (Czechoslovakia) Tomáš Šmíd (quarterfinals)
2. (Brazil) Givaldo Barbosa / (Brazil) Ivan Kley (first round)
3. (Sweden) Hans Simonsson / (Sweden) Stefan Simonsson (champions)
4. (Spain) Sergio Casal / (Spain) Emilio Sánchez (semifinals)

== Draw ==
Key

- Q = Qualifier
- WC = Wild card
- LL = Lucky loser
- Alt = Alternate
- ITF = ITF entry
- PR = Protected ranking
- SR = Special ranking
- SE = Special exempt
- JE = Junior exempt
- JR = Junior Accelerator Programme entrant
- CO = College Accelerator Programme entrant
- NG = Next Gen Accelerator Program entrant
- w/o = Walkover
- r = Retired
- d = Defaulted

=== Draw ===
First round
1	(West Germany) A Maurer (Czechoslovakia) T Šmíd	6	4	6
(Netherlands) M Albert (Netherlands) J Vekemans	0	6	2
(Australia) C Limberger (Australia) M Woodforde	6	7
(West Germany) R Osterthun (Netherlands) M Schapers	3	6
4	(Spain) S Casal (Spain) E Sánchez	6	7
(Brazil) T Koch (Brazil) F Roese	3	5
(United States) E Adams (Australia) T Allan	6	6	2
(Netherlands) M Oosting (Netherlands) H van Boeckel	4	7	6
(Australia) R Barlow (New Zealand) D Mustard	1	6	4
(West Germany) D Keretić (Hungary) Z Kuhárszky	6	2	6
(Australia) D Cahill (Australia) S Youl	4	4
3	(Sweden) H Simonsson (Sweden) S Simonsson	6	6
(Italy) A de Minicis (Switzerland) C Mezzadri	6	5	1
(Sweden) P Hjertquist (Sweden) P Svensson	4	7	6
(Spain) JA Rodríguez (Spain) Ricardo Sánchez Rueda	7	6
2	(Brazil) G Barbosa (Brazil) I Kley	6	4

Quarterfinals
1	(West Germany) A Maurer (Czechoslovakia) T Šmíd	2	6
(Australia) C Limberger (Australia) M Woodforde	6	7
4	(Spain) S Casal (Spain) E Sánchez	7	6
(Netherlands) M Oosting (Netherlands) H van Boeckel	5	1
(West Germany) D Keretić (Hungary) Z Kuhárszky	2	2
3	(Sweden) H Simonsson (Sweden) S Simonsson	6	6
(Sweden) P Hjertquist (Sweden) P Svensson	6	6
(Spain) JA Rodríguez (Spain) Ricardo Sánchez Rueda	4	4

Semifinals
(Australia) C Limberger (Australia) M Woodforde	6	5	6
4	(Spain) S Casal (Spain) E Sánchez	4	7	3
3	(Sweden) H Simonsson (Sweden) S Simonsson	6	6
(Sweden) P Hjertquist (Sweden) P Svensson	2	4

Final
(Australia) C Limberger (Australia) M Woodforde	3	4
3	(Sweden) H Simonsson (Sweden) S Simonsson	6	6
