= 1985 Dutch Open (tennis) =

- Date: 22–28 July
- Edition: 28th
- Category: Grand Prix
- Draw: 32S / 16D
- Prize money: $80,000
- Surface: Clay / outdoor
- Location: Hilversum, Netherlands
- Venue: 't Melkhuisje

Champions

Singles
- (West Germany) Ricki Osterthun

Doubles
- (Sweden) Stefan Simonsson / (Sweden) Hans Simonsson
- Dutch Open

The 1985 Dutch Open was a Grand Prix men's tennis tournament staged in Hilversum, Netherlands. The tournament was played on outdoor clay courts and was held from 22 July until 28 July 1985. It was the 28th edition of the tournament. Ricki Osterthun won the singles title.

== Finals ==
=== Singles ===
(West Germany) Ricki Osterthun defeated (Sweden) Kent Carlsson 4–6, 4–6, 6–4, 6–2, 6–3

- It was Osterthun's only singles title of his career.

=== Doubles ===
(Sweden) Hans Simonsson / (Sweden) Stefan Simonsson defeated (Australia) Carl Limberger / (Australia) Mark Woodforde 6–3, 6–4
