= 1989 Lorraine Open =

- Date: 27 February – 5 March
- Edition: 11th
- Category: Grand Prix
- Draw: 32S / 16D
- Prize money: $100,000
- Surface: Carpet (i)
- Location: Nancy, France

Champions

Singles
- (France) Guy Forget

Doubles
- (West Germany) Udo Riglewski / (Sweden) Tobias Svantesson
← 1988 ·	Lorraine Open

The 1989 Lorraine Open was a men's tennis tournament played on indoor carpet courts in Nancy, France, and was part of the 1989 Nabisco Grand Prix. The tournament took place from 27 February through 5 March 1989. It was the 11th and final edition of the tournament. Third-seeded Guy Forget won the singles title.

== Finals ==
=== Singles ===
(France) Guy Forget defeated (Netherlands) Michiel Schapers 6–3, 7–6^{(7–5)}

- It was Forget's only singles title of the year and the second of his career.

=== Doubles ===
(West Germany) Udo Riglewski / (Sweden) Tobias Svantesson defeated (Portugal) João Cunha e Silva / (Belgium) Eduardo Masso 6–4, 6–7, 7–6

- It was Riglewski's 1st title of the year and the 3rd of his career. It was Svantesson's 1st title of the year and the 1st of his career.
