= 1988 Lorraine Open =

Men's tennis tournament

- Date: 22–28 February
- Edition: 10th
- Category: Grand Prix
- Draw: 32S / 16D
- Prize money: $93,400
- Surface: Carpet (i)
- Location: Metz, France

Champions

Singles
- (Sweden) Jonas Svensson

Doubles
- (Czechoslovakia) Jaroslav Navrátil / (Netherlands) Tom Nijssen
← 1987 ·	Lorraine Open	· 1989 →

The 1988 Lorraine Open was a men's tennis tournament played on indoor carpet courts in Metz France, and was part of the 1988 Nabisco Grand Prix. It was the 10th edition of the tournament and took place from 22 February through 29 February 1988. First-seeded Jonas Svensson won the singles title.

== Finals ==
=== Singles ===
(Sweden) Jonas Svensson defeated (Netherlands) Michiel Schapers 6–2, 6–4

- It was Svensson's 1st singles title of the year and the 3rd of his career.

=== Doubles ===
(Czechoslovakia) Jaroslav Navrátil / (Netherlands) Tom Nijssen defeated (United States) Rill Baxter / (Nigeria) Nduka Odizor 6–2, 6–7, 7–6
