= 1987 Lorraine Open =

- Date: 23–29 March
- Edition: 9th
- Category: Grand Prix
- Draw: 32S / 16D
- Prize money: $89,400
- Surface: Carpet (i)
- Location: Nancy, France

Champions

Singles
- (Australia) Pat Cash

Doubles
- (India) Ramesh Krishnan / (Italy) Claudio Mezzadri
- Lorraine Open

The 1987 Lorraine Open was a men's tennis tournament played on indoor carpet courts in Nancy, France, and was part of the 1987 Nabisco Grand Prix. It was the ninth edition of the tournament took place from 23 March through 29 March 1987. First-seeded Pat Cash won the singles title.

== Finals ==
=== Singles ===
(Australia) Pat Cash defeated (Australia) Wally Masur 6–2, 6–3

- It was Cash' 1st singles title of the year and the 3rd of his career.

=== Doubles ===
(India) Ramesh Krishnan / (Italy) Claudio Mezzadri defeated (Canada) Grant Connell / (United States) Larry Scott 6–4, 6–4
