= 1982 Lorraine Open =

- Date: 15–21 March 1982
- Edition: 4th
- Category: Grand Prix
- Draw: 32S / 16D
- Prize money: $75,000
- Surface: Carpet (i)
- Location: Metz, France

Champions

Singles
- (United States) Erick Iskersky

Doubles
- (Australia) David Carter / (Australia) Paul Kronk
← 1981 ·	Lorraine Open	· 1983 →

The 1982 Lorraine Open was a men's tennis tournament played on indoor carpet courts. The event was part of the 1982 Volvo Grand Prix. It was played in Metz in France and was held from 15 March through 21 March 1982. It was the fourth edition of the tournament and unseeded Erick Iskersky won the singles title.

== Finals ==
=== Singles ===
(United States) Erick Iskersky defeated (United States) Steve Denton 6–4, 6–3

- It was Iskersky's only singles title of his career.

=== Doubles ===
(Australia) David Carter / (Australia) Paul Kronk defeated (Republic of Ireland) Matt Doyle / (United States) David Siegler 6–3, 7–6
