= 1986 ABN World Tennis Tournament – Doubles =

Doubles
- 1986 ABN World Tennis Tournament

Final
- Champions: (Sweden) Stefan Edberg (Socialist Federal Republic of Yugoslavia) Slobodan Živojinović
- Runners-up: (Poland) Wojciech Fibak (United States) Matt Mitchell
- Score: 2–6, 6–3, 6–2

Details
- Draw: 16
- Seeds: 4

Events
Singles	Doubles
- Rotterdam Open

Pavel Složil and Tomáš Šmíd were the defending champions but competed this year with different partners, with Složil teaming up with Jakob Hlasek and Šmíd teaming up with John Fitzgerald. Both pairs faced each other at the first round, with Hlasek and Složil winning the match 7–6, 6–7, 6–4. The pair eventually lost in the quarterfinals to Stefan Edberg and Slobodan Živojinović.

Edberg and Živojinović won the title by defeating Wojciech Fibak and Matt Mitchell 2–6, 6–3, 6–2 in the final.

== Seeds ==
1. (France) Guy Forget / (Sweden) Anders Järryd (first round)
2. (Sweden) Joakim Nyström / (Sweden) Mats Wilander (semifinals)
3. (Switzerland) Heinz Günthardt / (Hungary) Balázs Taróczy (first round)
4. (Australia) Mark Edmondson / (Australia) Kim Warwick (quarterfinals)

== Draw ==
Key

- Q = Qualifier
- WC = Wild card
- LL = Lucky loser
- Alt = Alternate
- ITF = ITF entry
- PR = Protected ranking
- SR = Special ranking
- SE = Special exempt
- JE = Junior exempt
- JR = Junior Accelerator Programme entrant
- CO = College Accelerator Programme entrant
- NG = Next Gen Accelerator Program entrant
- w/o = Walkover
- r = Retired
- d = Defaulted

=== Draw ===
First round
1	(France) G Forget (Sweden) A Järryd	3	2
(Poland) W Fibak (United States) M Mitchell	6	6
(United States) M De Palmer (United States) G Donnelly	6	3	7
(United States) M Dickson (Australia) B Drewett	4	6	6
4	(Australia) M Edmondson (Australia) K Warwick	7	6
WC	(United States) J Canter (Netherlands) M Schapers	5	2
(Australia) B Dyke (Australia) W Masur	7	6
(New Zealand) K Evernden (France) H Leconte	6	4
(Switzerland) J Hlasek (Czechoslovakia) P Složil	7	6	6
(Australia) J Fitzgerald (Czechoslovakia) T Šmíd	6	7	4
(Sweden) S Edberg (Socialist Federal Republic of Yugoslavia) S Živojinović	6	6
3	(Switzerland) H Günthardt (Hungary) B Taróczy	3	3
(United Kingdom) C Dowdeswell (Israel) S Perkiss	6	6	6
(Spain) S Casal (Spain) E Sánchez	7	4	7
(South Africa) B Levine (Australia) L Warder	6	4	2
2	(Sweden) J Nyström (Sweden) M Wilander	3	6	6

Quarterfinals
(Poland) W Fibak (United States) M Mitchell	6	7	6
(United States) M De Palmer (United States) G Donnelly	7	5	4
4	(Australia) M Edmondson (Australia) K Warwick	2	1
(Australia) B Dyke (Australia) W Masur	6	6
(Switzerland) J Hlasek (Czechoslovakia) P Složil	6	6
(Sweden) S Edberg (Socialist Federal Republic of Yugoslavia) S Živojinović	7	7
(Spain) S Casal (Spain) E Sánchez	7	6	4
2	(Sweden) J Nyström (Sweden) M Wilander	6	7	6

Semifinals
(Poland) W Fibak (United States) M Mitchell	6	7
(Australia) B Dyke (Australia) W Masur	3	6
(Sweden) S Edberg (Socialist Federal Republic of Yugoslavia) S Živojinović	6	6
2	(Sweden) J Nyström (Sweden) M Wilander	3	4

Final
(Poland) W Fibak (United States) M Mitchell	6	3	2
(Sweden) S Edberg (Socialist Federal Republic of Yugoslavia) S Živojinović	2	6	6
