= Jan-Willem Lodder =

Dutch tennis player

- Country (sports): Netherlands
- Born: 3 November 1966 (age 58); Soest, Netherlands
- Height: 6 ft 4 in (193 cm)
- Plays: Right-handed
- Prize money: $17,111

Singles
- Career record: 2–2
- Highest ranking: No. 214 (8 Sep 1986)

Grand Slam singles results
- Wimbledon: Q2 (1989)

Doubles
- Career record: 0–2
- Highest ranking: No. 249 (6 May 1991)

Jan-Willem Lodder (born 3 November 1966) is a Dutch former professional tennis player.

Lodder, who was based in Uithoorn, competed on the professional tour in the late 1980s and early 1990s.

A two-time entrant in the Dutch Open main draw, Lodder made the second round on both occasions, which included beating West German Davis Cup representative Damir Keretić in 1988. On the ATP Challenger Tour he reached one doubles final and in singles had wins over Patrick McEnroe and Alexander Volkov. He featured in the singles qualifying draw for the 1989 Wimbledon Championships.
