= 1980 Lorraine Open =

Men's tennis tournament edition

- Date: 17–23 March 1980
- Edition: 2nd
- Category: Grand Prix
- Draw: 32S / 16D
- Prize money: $50,000
- Surface: Carpet (i)
- Location: Metz, France

Champions

Singles
- (United States) Gene Mayer

Doubles
- (Australia) Colin Dibley / (United States) Gene Mayer
- Lorraine Open

The 1980 Lorraine Open was a men's tennis tournament played on indoor carpet courts. The event was part of the 1980 Volvo Grand Prix and was played in Nancy in France. It was the second edition of the tournament and was held from 17 March through 23 March 1980. First-seeded Gene Mayer won the singles title.

== Finals ==
=== Singles ===
(United States) Gene Mayer defeated (Italy) Gianni Ocleppo 6–3, 6–3, 6–0

- It was Mayer's 2nd singles title of the year and the 4th of his career.

=== Doubles ===
(Australia) Colin Dibley / (United States) Gene Mayer defeated (United States) Chris Delaney / (Australia) Kim Warwick 7–6, 7–5
