= 1986 Lorraine Open =

- Date: 10–17 March
- Edition: 8th
- Category: Grand Prix
- Draw: 32S / 16D
- Prize money: $85,000
- Surface: Carpet (i)
- Location: Metz, France

Champions

Singles
- (France) Thierry Tulasne

Doubles
- (Poland) Wojciech Fibak / (France) Guy Forget
- Lorraine Open

The 1986 Lorraine Open was a men's tennis tournament played on indoor carpet courts in Metz, France, and was part of the 1986 Nabisco Grand Prix. It was the eighth edition of the tournament and took place from 10 March through 17 March 1986. First-seeded Thierry Tulasne won the singles title.

== Finals ==
=== Singles ===
(France) Thierry Tulasne defeated (Australia) Broderick Dyke 6–4, 6–3

=== Doubles ===
(Poland) Wojciech Fibak / (France) Guy Forget defeated (Paraguay) Francisco González / (Netherlands) Michiel Schapers 2–6, 6–2, 6–4
