= Paul McNamee =

Australian tennis coach and former tennis player

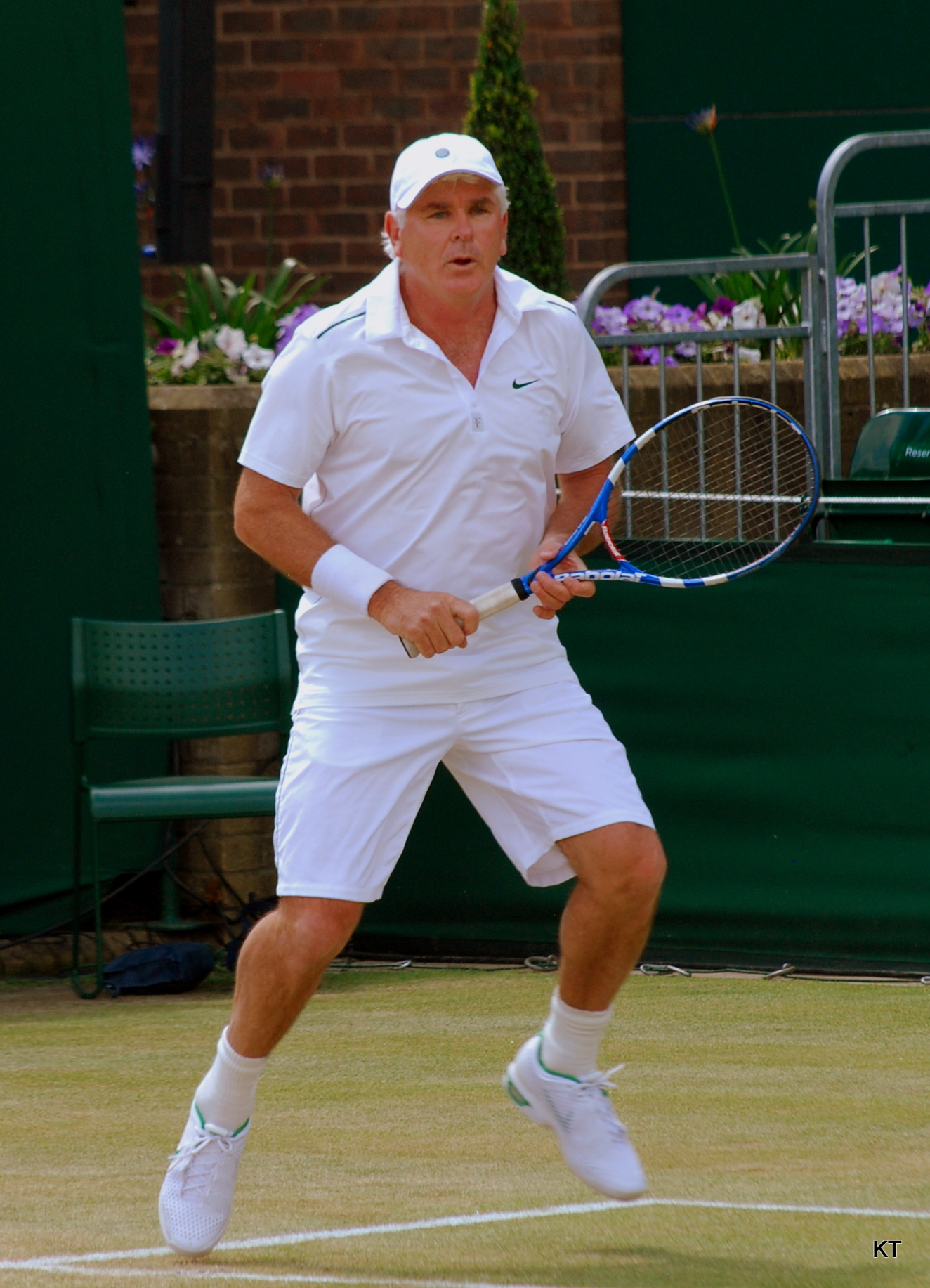
- McNamee playing tennis in 2011
- Country (sports): Australia
- Born: 12 November 1954 (age 71) Melbourne, Australia
- Height: 1.78 m (5 ft 10 in)
- Turned pro: 1973
- Retired: 1988
- Plays: Right-handed (two-handed backhand) *single-handed until 1979
- College: Monash University
- Prize money: $1,233,615

Singles
- Career record: 247–231
- Career titles: 2
- Highest ranking: No. 24 (12 May 1986)

Grand Slam singles results
- Australian Open: SF (1982)
- French Open: 4R (1980)
- Wimbledon: 4R (1982)
- US Open: 2R (1979, 1983, 1984, 1986)

Other tournaments
- WCT Finals: 1R (1983)

Doubles
- Career record: 306–163
- Career titles: 24 (Note: 1980 San Juan tournament was part of Grand Prix circuit but the doubles event not listed by the ATP.)
- Highest ranking: No. 1 (8 June 1981)

Grand Slam doubles results
- Australian Open: W (1979, 1983)
- French Open: SF (1986)
- Wimbledon: W (1980, 1982)
- US Open: SF (1980)

Other doubles tournaments
- Tour Finals: F (1980)

Grand Slam mixed doubles results
- Wimbledon: W (1985)

Team competitions
- Davis Cup: W (1983, 1986)

Paul McNamee (born 12 November 1954) is an Australian former doubles world No. 1 tennis player and prominent sports administrator.

== Junior career ==
In his hometown, McNamee won the boys' singles tournament at the 1973 Australian Open.

== Professional career ==
McNamee is the only player to switch a grip as a professional, changing from a one-handed backhand to two-handed in 1979. He won two singles and twenty-three doubles titles during his professional career. A right-hander, he reached his highest singles ATP-ranking on 12 May 1986 when he became the world No. 24. McNamee reached his highest doubles ATP-ranking on 8 June 1981 when he became the world No. 1. McNamee won 24 men's doubles titles including four Grand Slam doubles titles in his career. He won the 1979 Australian Open and the 1980 and 1982 Wimbledon Championships with Peter McNamara and the 1983 Australian Open with Mark Edmondson. He won the mixed-doubles title in Wimbledon with Martina Navratilova in 1985.

When John McEnroe won Wimbledon in 1984, McNamee was the only player to take a set off McEnroe throughout the entire championship when he won the third set of their first-round match.

McNamee was also a member of the Australian Davis Cup Team which won the Davis Cup in 1983 and 1986.

In 1987, McNamee became Melbourne's last officially crowned King of Moomba. A Moomba Monarch was subsequently selected. (However, male Monarchs were popularly, but unofficially, still called King of Moomba).

== Sports administrator ==
McNamee played a key role in the founding of the Hopman Cup international tennis tournament in 1988. He served as tournament director of the Hopman Cup and CEO of the Australian Open until 2006.

From 2006 to 2008 he was the tournament director for Golf Australia of the Australian Golf Open. He also served as the CEO of the Melbourne Football Club from March to July 2008.

In late 2008, it was revealed that McNamee has joined the push for Australia to field a cycling team at the Tour de France – with support from Cadel Evans as a consultant for Australian Road Cycling, a Melbourne-based consortium.

== Career finals ==
=== Singles: 7 (2 titles / 5 runner-ups) ===
Result	W-L	Date	Tournament	Surface	Opponent	Score
Win	1–0	Apr 1980	Palm Harbor, US	Hard	(United States) Stan Smith	6–4, 6–3
Loss	1–1	Sep 1980	Palermo, Italy	Clay	(Argentina) Guillermo Vilas	4–6, 0–6, 0–6
Win	2–1	Nov 1982	Baltimore WCT, US	Carpet	(Argentina) Guillermo Vilas	4–6, 7–5, 7–5, 2–6, 6–3
Loss	2–2	Apr 1983	Houston, US	Clay	(Czechoslovakia) Ivan Lendl	2–6, 0–6, 3–6
Loss	2–3	Oct 1983	Brisbane, Australia	Carpet	(Australia) Pat Cash	6–4, 4–6, 3–6
Loss	2–4	Apr 1986	Nice, France	Clay	(Spain) Emilio Sánchez	1–6, 3–6
Loss	2–5	Aug 1986	St. Vincent, Italy	Clay	(Italy) Simone Colombo	6–2, 3–6, 6–7

=== Doubles: 38 (23 titles / 15 runner-ups) ===
Result	W/L	Date	Tournament	Surface	Partner	Opponents	Score
Loss	0–1	Nov 1977	Santiago, Chile	Clay	(United States) Henry Bunis	(Chile) Patricio Cornejo (Chile) Jaime Fillol	7–5, 1–6, 1–6
Win	1–1	Apr 1979	Nice, France	Clay	(Australia) Peter McNamara	(Czechoslovakia) Pavel Složil (Czechoslovakia) Tomáš Šmíd	6–1, 3–6, 6–2
Win	2–1	Apr 1979	Cairo, Egypt	Clay	(Australia) Peter McNamara	(India) Anand Amritraj (India) Vijay Amritraj	7–5, 6–4
Win	3–1	Sep 1979	Palermo, Italy	Clay	(Australia) Peter McNamara	(Egypt) Ismail El Shafei (United Kingdom) John Feaver	7–5, 7–6
Win	4–1	Dec 1979	Sydney Outdoor, Australia	Grass	(Australia) Peter McNamara	(United States) Steve Docherty (United States) Christopher Lewis	7–6, 6–3
Win	5–1	Jan 1980	Australian Open, Melbourne	Grass	(Australia) Peter McNamara	(Australia) Cliff Letcher (Australia) Paul Kronk	7–6, 6–2
Win	6–1	Feb 1980	San Juan, US	Hard	(Australia) Paul Kronk	(South Africa) Robert Trogolo (United States) Mark Turpin	7–6, 6–3
Win	7–1	Apr 1980	Palm Harbor, US	Hard	(Australia) Paul Kronk	(Australia) Steve Docherty (Australia) John James	6–4, 7–5
Win	8–1	Apr 1980	Houston, US	Clay	(Australia) Peter McNamara	(United States) Marty Riessen (United States) Sherwood Stewart	6–4, 6–4
Loss	8–2	May 1980	Forest Hills WCT, US	Clay	(Australia) Peter McNamara	(United States) Peter Fleming (United States) John McEnroe	2–6, 7–5, 2–6
Loss	8–3	Jun 1980	London/Queen's Club, UK	Grass	(United States) Sherwood Stewart	(Australia) Rod Frawley (Australia) Geoff Masters	2–6, 6–4, 9–11
Win	9–3	Jul 1980	Wimbledon, London	Grass	(Australia) Peter McNamara	(United States) Robert Lutz (United States) Stan Smith	7–6, 6–3, 6–7, 6–4
Win	10–3	Nov 1980	Stockholm, Sweden	Carpet	(Switzerland) Heinz Günthardt	(United States) Robert Lutz (United States) Stan Smith	6–7, 6–3, 6–2
Loss	10–4	Nov 1980	Bologna, Italy	Carpet	(United States) Steve Denton	(Hungary) Balázs Taróczy (United States) Butch Walts	6–2, 3–6, 0–6
Loss	10–5	Dec 1980	Johannesburg, South Africa	Hard	(Switzerland) Heinz Günthardt	(United States) Robert Lutz (United States) Stan Smith	7–6, 3–6, 4–6
Win	11–5	Dec 1980	Sydney Outdoor, Australia	Grass	(Australia) Peter McNamara	(United States) Vitas Gerulaitis (United States) Brian Gottfried	6–2, 6–4
Loss	11–6	Jan 1981	Australian Open, Melbourne	Grass	(Australia) Peter McNamara	(Australia) Mark Edmondson (Australia) Kim Warwick	5–7, 4–6
Win	12–6	Jan 1981	Masters Doubles, London	Carpet	(Australia) Peter McNamara	(United States) Victor Amaya (United States) Hank Pfister	6–3, 2–6, 3–6, 6–3, 6–2
Loss	12–7	May 1981	Hamburg, Germany	Clay	(Australia) Peter McNamara	(Chile) Hans Gildemeister (Ecuador) Andrés Gómez	4–6, 6–3, 4–6
Win	13–7	Jul 1981	Stuttgart Outdoor, Germany	Clay	(Australia) Peter McNamara	(Australia) Mark Edmondson (United States) Mike Estep	2–6, 6–4, 7–6
Win	14–7	Dec 1981	Sydney Outdoor, Australia	Grass	(Australia) Peter McNamara	(United States) Hank Pfister (United States) John Sadri	6–7, 7–6, 7–6
Loss	14–8	Apr 1982	Nice, France	Clay	(Hungary) Balázs Taróczy	(France) Henri Leconte (France) Yannick Noah	7–5, 4–6, 3–6
Win	15–8	Apr 1982	Monte Carlo, Monaco	Clay	(Australia) Peter McNamara	(Australia) Mark Edmondson (United States) Sherwood Stewart	6–7, 7–6, 6–3
Win	16–8	Apr 1982	Bournemouth, UK	Clay	(United Kingdom) Buster Mottram	(France) Henri Leconte (Romania) Ilie Năstase	3–6, 7–6, 6–3
Win	17–8	Jul 1982	Wimbledon, London	Grass	(Australia) Peter McNamara	(United States) Peter Fleming (United States) John McEnroe	6–3, 6–2
Win	18–8	Feb 1983	Memphis, US	Carpet	(Australia) Peter McNamara	(United States) Tim Gullikson (United States) Tom Gullikson	6–3, 5–7, 6–4
Win	19–8	Jun 1983	London/Queen's Club, UK	Grass	(United States) Brian Gottfried	(South Africa) Kevin Curren (United States) Steve Denton	6–4, 6–3
Loss	19–9	Jul 1983	Washington D.C., US	Clay	(United States) Ferdi Taygan	(United States) Mark Dickson (Brazil) Cássio Motta	2–6, 6–1, 4–6
Win	20–9	Oct 1983	Brisbane, Australia	Carpet	(Australia) Pat Cash	(Australia) Mark Edmondson (Australia) Kim Warwick	7–6, 7–6
Win	21–9	Dec 1983	Australian Open, Melbourne	Grass	(Australia) Mark Edmondson	(United States) Steve Denton (United States) Sherwood Stewart	6–3, 7–6
Win	22–9	Apr 1984	Houston, US	Clay	(Australia) Pat Cash	(United States) David Dowlen (Nigeria) Nduka Odizor	7–5, 4–6, 6–3
Win	23–9	Apr 1984	Aix-en-Provence, France	Clay	(Australia) Pat Cash	(New Zealand) Chris Lewis (Australia) Wally Masur	4–6, 6–3, 6–4
Win	24–9	Jun 1984	London/Queen's Club, UK	Grass	(Australia) Pat Cash	(South Africa) Bernard Mitton (United States) Butch Walts	6–4, 6–3
Loss	24–10	Jul 1984	Wimbledon, London	Grass	(Australia) Pat Cash	(United States) Peter Fleming (United States) John McEnroe	2–6, 7–5, 2–6, 6–3, 3–6
Loss	24–11	Oct 1984	Hong Kong	Hard	(Australia) Mark Edmondson	(United States) Ken Flach (United States) Robert Seguso	7–6, 3–6, 5–7
Loss	24–12	Mar 1985	Rotterdam, Netherlands	Carpet	(United States) Vitas Gerulaitis	(Czechoslovakia) Pavel Složil (Czechoslovakia) Tomáš Šmíd	4–6, 4–6
Loss	24–13	Jul 1985	Boston, US	Clay	(Australia) Peter McNamara	(Belgium) Libor Pimek (Socialist Federal Republic of Yugoslavia) Slobodan Živojinović	6–2, 4–6, 6–7
Loss	24–14	Mar 1986	Fort Myers, US	Hard	(Australia) Peter Doohan	(Ecuador) Andrés Gómez (Czechoslovakia) Ivan Lendl	5–7, 4–6
Loss	24–15	Oct 1986	Sydney Indoor, Australia	Hard (i)	(Australia) Peter McNamara	(West Germany) Boris Becker (Australia) John Fitzgerald	4–6, 6–7
