= 1984 Lorraine Open =

- Date: 12–18 March
- Edition: 6th
- Category: Grand Prix
- Draw: 32S / 16D
- Prize money: $75,000
- Surface: Carpet (i)
- Location: Metz, France

Champions

Singles
- (India) Ramesh Krishnan

Doubles
- (South Africa) Eddie Edwards / (South Africa) Danie Visser
← 1983 ·	Lorraine Open	· 1985 →

The 1984 Lorraine Open was a men's tennis tournament played on indoor carpet courts. The event was part of the 1984 Volvo Grand Prix. It was the sixth edition of the tournament and was played in Metz in France from 12 March through 18 March 1984. Unseeded Ramesh Krishnan won the singles title.

== Finals ==
=== Singles ===
(India) Ramesh Krishnan defeated (Sweden) Jan Gunnarsson 6–3, 6–3

- It was Krishnan's 1st singles title of the year and the 3rd of his career.

=== Doubles ===
(South Africa) Eddie Edwards / (South Africa) Danie Visser defeated (Australia) Wayne Hampson / (Australia) Wally Masur 3–6, 6–4, 6–2
