= Rodney Harmon =

American tennis player

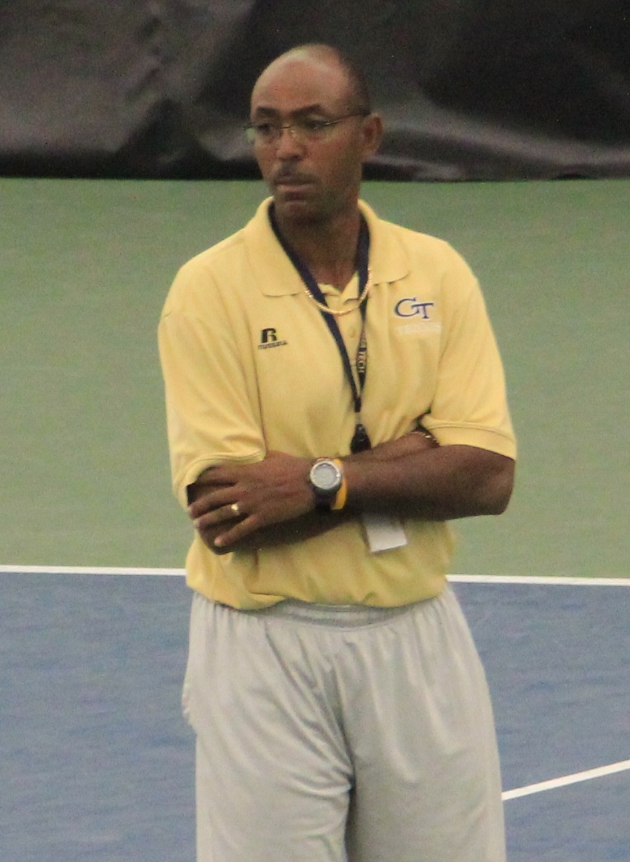
- Harmon in 2014
- Country (sports): United States
- Born: 16 August 1961 (age 64) Richmond, Virginia
- Height: 6 ft 2 in (1.88 m)
- Plays: Right-handed
- Prize money: $102,003

Singles
- Career record: 34–42
- Career titles: 0
- Highest ranking: No. 56 (15 August 1983)

Grand Slam singles results
- Australian Open: 1R (1984)
- Wimbledon: 3R (1983)
- US Open: QF (1982)

Doubles
- Career record: 14–19
- Career titles: 1

Grand Slam doubles results
- Wimbledon: 1R (1985)
- US Open: 3R (1983)

Rodney Harmon (born August 16, 1961) is a former ATP tennis player.

Perhaps Rodney's greatest result came at the 1982 U.S. Open, during his Grand Slam debut, when he got through to the quarterfinals overcoming Rolf Gehring, Henrik Sundström, Scott Davis and Eliot Teltscher, seeded 8th, in an epic fifth set tiebreak. He lost to eventual champion Jimmy Connors in the quarterfinals. Harmon is featured on Tennis Channel's Tennis Channel Academy, where he stars in a 30-minute coaching show.

Rodney was only the second African-American man to have reached the U.S. Open quarterfinals, alongside legend Arthur Ashe until James Blake in 2005.

Rodney was named head coach of the Georgia Tech Yellow Jackets women's tennis team on July 3, 2012.

== Career finals ==
=== Doubles (1 title) ===
Result	W–L	Date	Tournament	Surface	Partner	Opponents	Score
Win	1–0	Mar 1985	Lorraine Open, U.S.	Hard (i)	(United States) Marcel Freeman	(Czechoslovakia) Jaroslav Navrátil (Sweden) Jonas Svensson	6–4, 7–6
