= Lorraine Open =

Defunct tennis tournament
- Event name: Lorraine Open
- Tour: Grand Prix circuit
- Founded: 1979
- Abolished: 1989
- Editions: 11
- Location: Nancy, France (odd years); Metz, France (even years)
- Surface: Indoor carpet court

The Lorraine Open is a defunct men's tennis tournament that was played as part of the Grand Prix tennis circuit from 1979 to 1989. It was held in Lorraine, one of the 26 regions of France. The venue alternated annually from Lorraine's two main cities of Metz and Nancy, with Nancy hosting odd-numbered years, and Metz even-numbered. The surface in both locations was indoor carpet courts.

== Results ==
=== Singles ===
Year	Champions	Runners-up	Score
1979	(France) Yannick Noah	(France) Jean-Louis Haillet	6–2, 5–7, 6–1, 7–5
1980	(United States) Gene Mayer	(Italy) Gianni Ocleppo	6–3, 6–3, 6–0
1981	(Czechoslovakia) Pavel Složil	(Romania) Ilie Năstase	6–2, 7–5
1982	(United States) Erick Iskersky	(United States) Steve Denton	6–4, 6–3
1983	(United States) Nick Saviano	(United States) Chip Hooper	6–4, 4–6, 6–3
1984	(India) Ramesh Krishnan	(Sweden) Jan Gunnarsson	6–3, 6–3
1985	(United States) Tim Wilkison	(Socialist Federal Republic of Yugoslavia) Slobodan Živojinović	4–6, 7–6, 9–7
1986	(France) Thierry Tulasne	(Australia) Broderick Dyke	6–4, 6–3
1987	(Australia) Pat Cash	(Australia) Wally Masur	6–2, 6–3
1988	(Sweden) Jonas Svensson	(Netherlands) Michiel Schapers	6–2, 6–4
1989	(France) Guy Forget	(Netherlands) Michiel Schapers	6–3, 7–6

=== Doubles ===
Year	Champions	Runners-up	Score
1979	(West Germany) Klaus Eberhard (West Germany) Karl Meiler	(United Kingdom) Robin Drysdale (United Kingdom) Andrew Jarrett	4–6, 7–6, 6–3
1980	(Australia) Colin Dibley (United States) Gene Mayer	(United States) Chris Delaney (Australia) Kim Warwick	7–6, 7–5
1981	(Romania) Ilie Năstase (Italy) Adriano Panatta	(United Kingdom) John Feaver (Czechoslovakia) Jiří Hřebec	6–4, 2–6, 6–4
1982	(Australia) David Carter (Australia) Paul Kronk	(United States) Matt Doyle (United States) David Siegler	6–3, 7–6
1983	(Sweden) Jan Gunnarsson (Sweden) Anders Järryd	(Chile) Ricardo Acuña (Chile) Belus Prajoux	7–5, 6–3
1984	(South Africa) Eddie Edwards (South Africa) Danie Visser	(Australia) Wayne Hampson (Australia) Wally Masur	3–6, 6–4, 6–2
1985	(United States) Marcel Freeman (United States) Rodney Harmon	(Czechoslovakia) Jaroslav Navrátil (Sweden) Jonas Svensson	6–4, 7–6
1986	(Poland) Wojtek Fibak (France) Guy Forget	(Paraguay) Francisco González (Netherlands) Michiel Schapers	2–6, 6–2, 6–4
1987	(India) Ramesh Krishnan (Switzerland) Claudio Mezzadri	(Canada) Grant Connell (United States) Scott Davis	6–4, 6–4
1988	(Czechoslovakia) Jaroslav Navrátil (Netherlands) Tom Nijssen	(United States) Rill Baxter (Nigeria) Nduka Odizor	6–2, 6–7, 7–6
1989	(West Germany) Udo Riglewski (Sweden) Tobias Svantesson	(Portugal) João Cunha Silva (Belgium) Eduardo Masso	6–4, 6–7, 7–6

== See also ==
- Moselle Open – men's tournament held in Metz
