= Johan Vekemans =

Dutch tennis player

- Country (sports): Netherlands
- Born: 6 December 1964 (age 60); Goirle, Netherlands
- Height: 6 ft 1 in (185 cm)
- Plays: Right-handed
- Prize money: $35,500

Singles
- Career record: 0–2
- Highest ranking: No. 239 (6 November 1989)

Grand Slam singles results
- French Open: 1R (1987)

Doubles
- Career record: 11–10
- Highest ranking: No. 75 (4 August 1986)

Grand Slam doubles results
- French Open: 2R (1986)

Johan Vekemans (born 6 December 1964) is a former professional tennis player from the Netherlands.

Vekemans enjoyed most of his tennis success while playing doubles. During his career he finished runner-up in 2 doubles events. He achieved a career-high doubles ranking of world No. 75 in 1986.

== Career finals ==
=== Doubles (2 runners-up) ===
Result	W-L	Date	Tournament	Surface	Partner	Opponents	Score
Loss	0–1	Aug 1986	Hilversum, Netherlands	Clay	(Netherlands) Tom Nijssen	(Czechoslovakia) Miloslav Mečíř (Czech Republic) Tomáš Šmíd	4–6, 2–6
Loss	0–2	Aug 1987	Hilversum, Netherlands	Clay	(Netherlands) Tom Nijssen	(Poland) Wojtek Fibak (Czech Republic) Miloslav Mečíř	6–7, 7–5, 2–6
