= Miloslav Mečíř =

Slovak tennis player (born 1964)

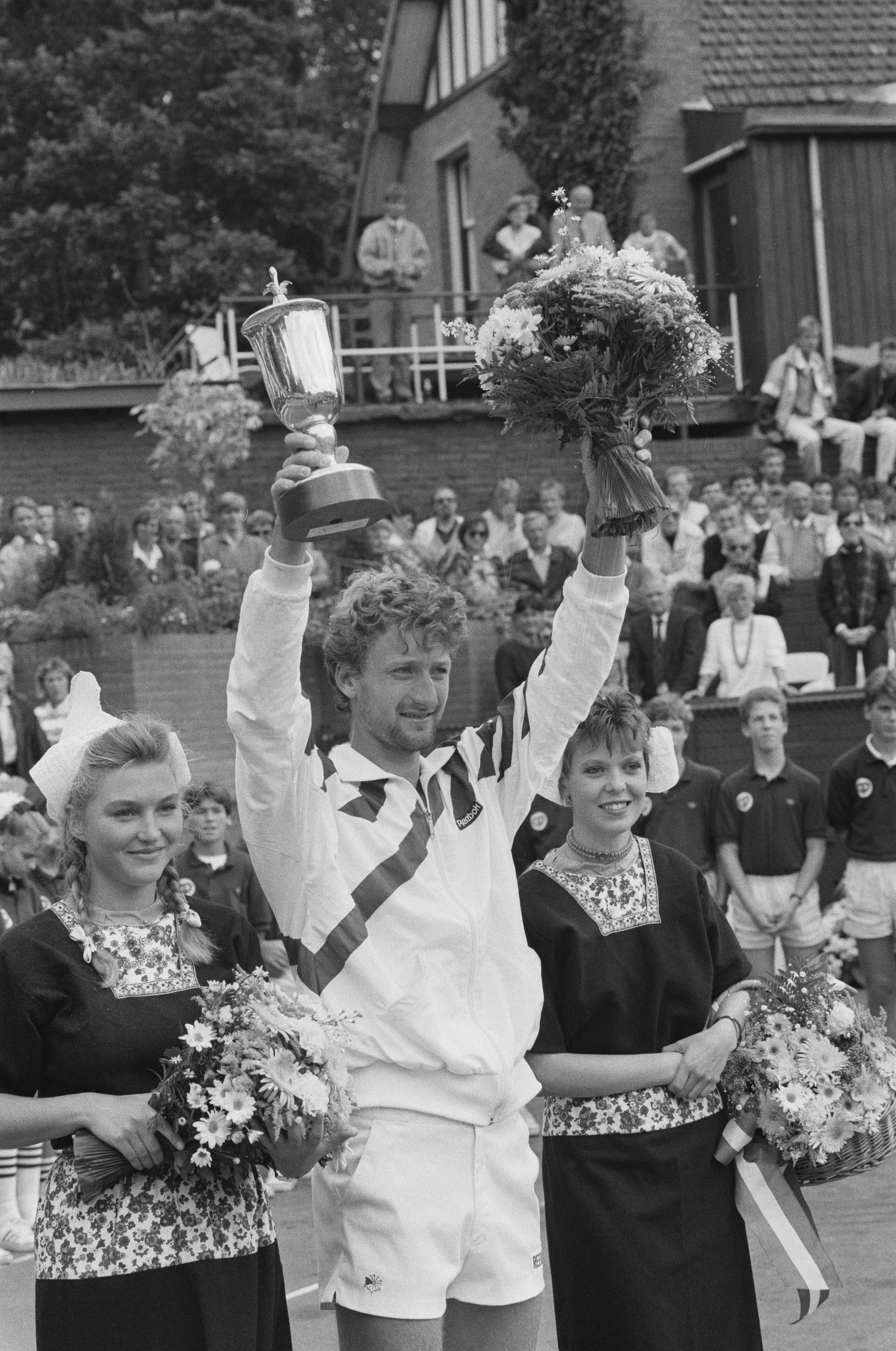
- Mečíř at the victory ceremony after winning the 1987 Dutch Open
- Country (sports): Czechoslovakia
- Residence: Bratislava, Slovakia
- Born: 19 May 1964 (age 62) Bojnice, Czechoslovakia
- Height: 1.90 m (6 ft 3 in)
- Turned pro: 1982
- Retired: 1990
- Plays: Right-handed (two-handed backhand)
- Prize money: $2,632,538

Singles
- Career record: 262–122 (68.2%)
- Career titles: 11
- Highest ranking: No. 4 (22 February 1988)

Grand Slam singles results
- Australian Open: F (1989)
- French Open: SF (1987)
- Wimbledon: SF (1988)
- US Open: F (1986)

Other tournaments
- Tour Finals: RR (1987)
- WCT Finals: W (1987)
- Olympic Games: W (1988)

Doubles
- Career record: 100–54 (64.9%)
- Career titles: 9
- Highest ranking: No. 4 (7 March 1988)

Grand Slam doubles results
- Australian Open: 4R (1987)
- French Open: 4R (1989)
- Wimbledon: 3R (1987, 1989)
- US Open: 4R (1987, 1988)

Other doubles tournaments
- Tour Finals: W (1987)
- Olympic Games: SF (1988)

Team competitions
- Davis Cup: SF (1985, 1986)
- Hopman Cup: W (1989)
Medal record
Men's tennis
Representing Czechoslovakia
Gold medal – first place	1988 Seoul	Singles
Bronze medal – third place	1988 Seoul	Doubles

Miloslav Mečíř (Slovak pronunciation: [ˈmilɔslaw ˈmetʂiːr̝̊]; born 19 May 1964) is a Slovak former professional tennis player. He won the singles gold medal at the 1988 Olympic Games, representing Czechoslovakia, and contested two major singles finals. In 1987 he won the WCT Finals, the season-ending championship for the World Championship Tennis tour. He reached a highest ranking of world No. 4 in singles in February 1988 and won 11 singles titles during his career. His son Miloslav Jr. is also a former professional tennis player.

== Career ==
Mečíř was born in Bojnice, Czechoslovakia (now part of Slovakia).

He reached two ATP finals in 1984 and began 1985 by beating Jimmy Connors in the semifinal at Philadelphia, before losing to world No. 1 John McEnroe in the final. He won his first ATP singles title in Rotterdam later that year, and ended 1985 ranked just outside the world's top 10.

He consolidated his position as a world class player in 1986, beating rising Stefan Edberg in straight sets at Wimbledon, before losing to defending champion Boris Becker in the quarterfinals. He reached his first Grand Slam final at the US Open later that year, beating Mats Wilander and Boris Becker in the US Open semi finals. He "handled the West German's booming serve with ease, used his groundstrokes to move Becker from side to side, and hit his serves so deep that Becker had trouble handling them" and Mecir won in five sets. In the final he faced fellow Czechoslovak, defending champion and world No. 1, Ivan Lendl. The 1986 US Open was notable for the fact that four players from Czechoslovakia competed in the two singles finals for men and women – Mečíř and Lendl, Helena Suková and Martina Navratilova. Lendl won the match in straight sets. Mečíř's 1986 US Open final appearance was the last major final to see a player still using a wooden racket.

Mečíř improved further in 1987, winning six singles and six doubles titles, notably winning the WCT Finals in Dallas, where he defeated John McEnroe in four sets. He met Lendl again in three high-profile matches that year, winning the final of the Lipton International Players Championships in Key Biscayne, Florida, while Lendl won the final of the German Open in Hamburg and the semifinals of the French Open.

By this time, Mečíř's sedate playing style was known to frustrate a lot of the more-powerful top ranked players. The Swedish players, in particular, were said to dislike playing against him.

Mečíř was on top form at Wimbledon in 1988, where he defeated Mats Wilander in the quarterfinal. It was Wilander's only Grand Slam singles defeat of the year (he won the 1988 Australian Open, French Open and US Open) yet Mečíř beat him in straight sets. He took a two-set lead in the semifinal against Edberg with a similar display, and later led by a break of serve in the final set, but Edberg eventually wore him down on the way to his first Wimbledon crown.

The highlight of Mečíř's career came later in 1988 when he was selected to represent Czechoslovakia in the Seoul Olympics. He defeated Eric Jelen, Jeremy Bates, Guy Forget and Michiel Schapers and then in the men's singles semifinals he exacted revenge over Wimbledon champion Edberg, in a five-set match. He then met Tim Mayotte of the U.S. in the men's singles final and won in four sets to claim the gold medal. He also won a bronze medal in the men's doubles, partnering Milan Šrejber.

In 1989, Mečíř reached his second Grand Slam final at the Australian Open in Melbourne. Again he came up against Lendl and lost in straight sets. He was overpowered by Lendl on a hot day when the court surface reached 135 degrees. Lendl's win saw him reclaim the world No. 1 ranking from Wilander. After the match, Lendl apologized to the crowd, explaining that he and coach Tony Roche had decided the best tactic against Mečíř was to hit shots deep and down the centre of the court, denying his opponent the angles he thrived on.

Mečíř was a member of the Czechoslovak teams that won the World Team Cup in 1987 and the inaugural Hopman Cup in 1989. He is currently the Slovak Davis Cup captain.

During his career, Mečíř won 11 singles titles and nine doubles titles. His career-high world ranking in both singles and doubles was world No. 4. His final career singles title came in 1989 at Indian Wells. His last doubles title was also won in 1989 in Rotterdam.

Throughout most of 1989 and into 1990, Mečíř suffered from a worsening back injury and he retired in July 1990, aged just 26.

== Playing style ==
Mečíř was a finesse player whose career straddled the transition from wooden and metal racquets towards modern graphite composites. He was noted for his touch shots as well as the ability to disguise his shots, particularly his two-handed backhand. His court coverage and graceful footwork earned him the nickname "The Big Cat". The French called him "Le Prestidigitateur" (The Conjuror).

Many top players used to cite Mečíř as the one player they most enjoyed watching because of his beautifully simple style and touch. He was known as the "Swede Killer" for the success that he had against Swedish players, especially Mats Wilander.

== Major finals ==
=== Grand Slam finals ===
==== Singles: 2 (0–2) ====
Result	Year	Championship	Surface	Opponent	Score
Loss	1986	US Open	Hard	(Czechoslovakia) Ivan Lendl	4–6, 2–6, 0–6
Loss	1989	Australian Open	Hard	(Czechoslovakia) Ivan Lendl	2–6, 2–6, 2–6

=== WCT Year–end championship finals ===
==== Singles: 1 (1–0) ====
Result	Year	Championship	Surface	Opponent	Score
Win	1987	Dallas	Carpet (i)	(United States) John McEnroe	6–0, 3–6, 6–2, 6–2

=== Olympic finals ===
==== Singles: 1 (1 gold medal) ====
Result	Year	Location	Surface	Opponent	Score
Gold	1988	Seoul	Hard	(United States) Tim Mayotte	3–6, 6–2, 6–4, 6–2

== ATP career finals ==
=== Singles: 24 (11 titles / 13 runner-ups) ===
Legend
Grand Slam (0–2)
Year-end championships – WCT (1–0)
Grand Prix (9–11)

Result	W–L	Date	Tournament	Surface	Opponent	Score
Loss	0–1	Dec 1983	Adelaide, Australia	Grass	(United States) Mike Bauer	6–3, 4–6, 1–6
Loss	0–2	Sep 1984	Palermo, Italy	Clay	(Italy) Francesco Cancellotti	0–6, 3–6
Loss	0–3	Oct 1984	Cologne, West Germany	Carpet (i)	(Sweden) Joakim Nyström	6–7, 2–6
Loss	0–4	Jan 1985	Philadelphia, U.S.	Carpet (i)	(United States) John McEnroe	3–6, 6–7^{(5–7)}, 1–6
Win	1–4	Mar 1985	Rotterdam, Netherlands	Carpet (i)	(Switzerland) Jakob Hlasek	6–1, 6–2
Win	2–4	Apr 1985	Hamburg, West Germany	Clay	(Sweden) Henrik Sundström	6–4, 6–1, 6–4
Loss	2–5	May 1985	Rome, Italy	Clay	(France) Yannick Noah	3–6, 6–3, 2–6, 6–7^{(4–7)}
Win	3–5	Aug 1986	Kitzbühel, Austria	Clay	(Ecuador) Andrés Gómez	6–4, 4–6, 6–1, 2–6, 6–3
Loss	3–6	Aug 1986	US Open, New York	Hard	(Czechoslovakia) Ivan Lendl	4–6, 2–6, 0–6
Loss	3–7	Sep 1986	Hamburg, West Germany	Clay	(France) Henri Leconte	2–6, 7–5, 4–6, 2–6
Win	4–7	Jan 1987	Auckland, New Zealand	Hard	(Netherlands) Michiel Schapers	6–2, 6–3, 6–4
Win	5–7	Jan 1987	Sydney, Australia	Grass	(Australia) Peter Doohan	6–2, 6–4
Win	6–7	Feb 1987	Miami, U.S.	Hard	(Czechoslovakia) Ivan Lendl	7–5, 6–2, 7–5
Loss	6–8	Mar 1987	Milan, Italy	Carpet (i)	(West Germany) Boris Becker	4–6, 3–6
Win	7–8	Apr 1987	WCT Finals, Dallas	Carpet (i)	(United States) John McEnroe	6–0, 3–6, 6–2, 6–2
Loss	7–9	Apr 1987	Hamburg, West Germany	Clay	(Czechoslovakia) Ivan Lendl	1–6, 3–6, 3–6
Win	8–9	Jul 1987	Stuttgart, West Germany	Clay	(Sweden) Jan Gunnarsson	6–0, 6–2
Win	9–9	Jul 1987	Hilversum, Netherlands	Clay	(Argentina) Guillermo Pérez Roldán	6–4, 1–6, 6–3, 6–2
Loss	9–10	Aug 1987	Kitzbühel, Austria	Clay	(Spain) Emilio Sánchez	4–6, 1–6, 6–4, 1–6
Loss	9–11	Feb 1988	Rotterdam, Netherlands	Carpet (i)	(Sweden) Stefan Edberg	6–7^{(5–7)}, 2–6
Loss	9–12	Mar 1988	Orlando, U.S.	Hard	(Soviet Union) Andrei Chesnokov	6–7^{(6–8)}, 1–6
Win	10–12	Sep 1988	Olympic Games, Seoul	Hard	(United States) Tim Mayotte	3–6, 6–2, 6–4, 6–2
Loss	10–13	Jan 1989	Australian Open, Melbourne	Hard	(Czechoslovakia) Ivan Lendl	2–6, 2–6, 2–6
Win	11–13	Mar 1989	Indian Wells, U.S.	Hard	(France) Yannick Noah	3–6, 2–6, 6–1, 6–2, 6–3

=== Doubles: 12 (9 titles / 3 runner-ups) ===
Legend
Grand Slam (0–0)
Year-end championships – ATP (1–0)
Grand Prix (8–3)

Result	W–L	Date	Tournament	Surface	Partner	Opponents	Score
Win	1–0	Jul 1986	Hilversum, Netherlands	Clay	(Czechoslovakia) Tomáš Šmíd	(Netherlands) Tom Nijssen (Netherlands) Johan Vekemans	6–4, 6–2
Win	2–0	Oct 1986	Toulouse, France	Hard (i)	(Czechoslovakia) Tomáš Šmíd	(Switzerland) Jakob Hlasek (Czechoslovakia) Pavel Složil	6–2, 3–6, 6–4
Win	3–0	Apr 1987	Hamburg, West Germany	Clay	(Czechoslovakia) Tomáš Šmíd	(Switzerland) Claudio Mezzadri (United States) Jim Pugh	4–6, 7–6, 6–2
Loss	3–1	May 1987	Rome, Italy	Clay	(Czechoslovakia) Tomáš Šmíd	(France) Guy Forget (France) Yannick Noah	2–6, 7–6, 3–6
Win	4–1	Jul 1987	Hilversum, Netherlands	Clay	(Poland) Wojciech Fibak	(Netherlands) Tom Nijssen (Netherlands) Johan Vekemans	7–6, 5–7, 6–2
Loss	4–2	Aug 1987	Kitzbühel, Austria	Clay	(Czechoslovakia) Tomáš Šmíd	(Spain) Sergio Casal (Spain) Emilio Sánchez	6–7, 6–7
Win	5–2	Aug 1987	Prague, Czechoslovakia	Clay	(Czechoslovakia) Tomáš Šmíd	(Czechoslovakia) Stanislav Birner (Czechoslovakia) Jaroslav Navrátil	6–3, 6–7, 6–3
Win	6–2	Sep 1987	Barcelona, Spain	Clay	(Czechoslovakia) Tomáš Šmíd	(Argentina) Javier Frana (Argentina) Christian Miniussi	6–1, 6–2
Win	7–2	Nov 1987	Wembley, U.K.	Carpet (i)	(Czechoslovakia) Tomáš Šmíd	(United States) Ken Flach (United States) Robert Seguso	7–5, 6–4
Win	8–2	Dec 1987	Masters Doubles, New York	Carpet (i)	(Czechoslovakia) Tomáš Šmíd	(United States) Ken Flach (United States) Robert Seguso	6–4, 7–5, 6–7^{(5–7)}, 6–3
Loss	8–3	Feb 1988	Milan, Italy	Carpet (i)	(Czechoslovakia) Tomáš Šmíd	(West Germany) Boris Becker (West Germany) Eric Jelen	3–6, 3–6
Win	9–3	Feb 1989	Rotterdam, Netherlands	Carpet (i)	(Czechoslovakia) Milan Šrejber	(Sweden) Jan Gunnarsson (Sweden) Magnus Gustafsson	7–6, 6–0

== Singles performance timelines ==
Key
W	F	SF	QF	#R	RR	Q#	DNQ	A	NH

(W) winner; (F) finalist; (SF) semifinalist; (QF) quarterfinalist; (#R) rounds 4, 3, 2, 1; (RR) round-robin stage; (Q#) qualification round; (DNQ) did not qualify; (A) absent; (NH) not held; (SR) strike rate (events won / competed); (W–L) win–loss record.

=== Grand Slam tournaments ===
Tournament	1983	1984	1985	1986	1987	1988	1989	1990	Career SR	Career win–loss
Australian Open	1R	2R	A	NH	QF	A	F	4R	0 / 5	12–5
French Open	A	1R	3R	2R	SF	A	1R	1R	0 / 6	8–6
Wimbledon	A	2R	1R	QF	3R	SF	3R	2R	0 / 7	15–7
US Open	A	A	2R	F	QF	3R	3R	A	0 / 5	15–5
Grand Slam Win–loss	0–1	2–3	3–3	11–3	14–4	7–2	10–4	4–3	N/A	50–23
Grand Slam SR	0 / 1	0 / 3	0 / 3	0 / 3	0 / 4	0 / 2	0 / 4	0 / 3	0 / 23	N/A
Year-end ranking	101	50	9	9	6	13	18	116	N/A	

=== Grand Prix tournaments ===
Tournament	1983	1984	1985	1986	1987	1988	1989	1990	Career SR
Indian Wells	A	A	A	A	QF	QF	W	1R	1 / 4
Miami	NH	NH	2R	A	W	SF	2R	A	1 / 4
Monte Carlo	A	A	A	3R	A	A	A	A	0 / 1
Rome	A	1R	F	3R	1R	A	1R	A	0 / 5
Hamburg	A	A	W	F	F	A	A	A	1 / 3
Canada	A	A	A	A	A	A	1R	A	0 / 1
Cincinnati	A	A	A	A	A	1R	A	A	0 / 1
Paris	A	A	A	1R	2R	2R	2R	A	0 / 4
The Masters	A	A	A	A	RR	A	A	A	0 / 1
Grand Prix SR	0 / 0	0 / 1	1 / 3	0 / 4	1 / 5	0 / 4	1 / 5	0 / 1	3 / 23

== Record against top-10 players ==
Mečíř's record against those who have been ranked in the top 10, with active players in boldface.

Player	Years	Matches	Record	Win%	Hard	Clay	Grass	Carpet
Number 1 ranked players								
(United States) Andre Agassi	1988	1	1–0	100%	1–0	0–0	0–0	0–0
(Romania) Ilie Nastase	1984	1	1–0	100%	1–0	0–0	0–0	0–0
(United States) Pete Sampras	1989	1	1–0	100%	1–0	0–0	0–0	0–0
(Sweden) Mats Wilander	1985–1988	11	7–4	64%	1–1	2–2	1–0	3–1
(United States) Jimmy Connors	1985–1989	4	2–2	50%	1–1	0–1	0–0	1–0
(United States) John McEnroe	1985–1989	5	2–3	40%	0–0	1–0	1–3	0–0
(Sweden) Stefan Edberg	1983–1990	15	5–10	33%	3–1	0–2	2–3	0–4
(Austria) Thomas Muster	1986–1988	3	1–2	33%	0–0	1–2	0–0	0–0
(Germany) Boris Becker	1985–1990	9	2–7	22%	1–2	0–1	0–1	1–3
(Czech Republic) Ivan Lendl	1986–1989	6	1–5	17%	1–2	0–2	0–0	0–1
Number 2 ranked players								
(United States) Michael Chang	1989	1	1–0	100%	1–0	0–0	0–0	0–0
(Croatia) Goran Ivanišević	1989	1	1–0	100%	1–0	0–0	0–0	0–0
(Czech Republic) Petr Korda	1988	1	1–0	100%	0–0	1–0	0–0	0–0
(Spain) Manuel Orantes	1983	1	1–0	100%	0–0	1–0	0–0	0–0
(Germany) Michael Stich	1990	1	0–1	0%	0–0	0–0	0–1	0–0
Number 3 ranked players								
(France) Yannick Noah	1985–1989	3	2–1	67%	2–0	0–1	0–0	0–0
(United States) Vitas Gerulaitis	1984	1	0–1	0%	0–0	0–0	0–0	0–1
Number 4 ranked players								
(France) Guy Forget	1986–1988	4	4–0	100%	2–0	0–0	0–0	2–0
(Ecuador) Andrés Gómez	1986–1987	2	2–0	100%	0–0	1–0	0–0	1–0
(United States) Brad Gilbert	1984–1988	3	2–1	67%	0–0	1–0	1–0	0–1
(Australia) Pat Cash	1987	2	1–1	50%	0–0	1–0	0–0	0–1
(Argentina) José Luis Clerc	1985	1	0–1	0%	0–0	0–1	0–0	0–0
Number 5 ranked players								
(United States) Jimmy Arias	1987	1	1–0	100%	1–0	0–0	0–0	0–0
(Sweden) Anders Järryd	1983–1987	9	4–5	44%	0–0	2–3	0–2	2–0
(United States) Kevin Curren	1987	1	0–1	0%	0–0	0–0	0–0	0–1
(France) Henri Leconte	1986	2	0–2	0%	0–0	0–2	0–0	0–0
Number 6 ranked players								
(Sweden) Henrik Sundström	1984–1985	2	2–0	100%	0–0	2–0	0–0	0–0
(Sweden) Kent Carlsson	1984–1987	6	4–2	67%	1–0	3–2	0–0	0–0
Number 7 ranked players								
(United States) Jay Berger	1988	1	1–0	100%	1–0	0–0	0–0	0–0
(United States) Johan Kriek	1987	1	1–0	100%	0–0	0–0	0–0	1–0
(United States) Tim Mayotte	1988	1	1–0	100%	1–0	0–0	0–0	0–0
(Switzerland) Jakob Hlasek	1985–1987	5	4–1	80%	1–0	1–0	0–0	2–1
(Sweden) Joakim Nyström	1984–1986	6	4–2	67%	1–2	1–0	0–0	2–0
(Spain) Emilio Sánchez	1986–1990	6	3–3	50%	0–2	0–1	0–0	3–0
(Spain) Juan Aguilera	1984–1989	3	0–3	0%	0–0	0–3	0–0	0–0
(United States) Sandy Mayer	1984	1	0–1	0%	0–1	0–0	0–0	0–0
(United States) Brian Teacher	1984	1	0–1	0%	0–0	0–0	0–1	0–0
Number 8 ranked players								
(Czech Republic) Karel Nováček	1986–1987	3	3–0	100%	1–0	2–0	0–0	0–0
Number 9 ranked players								
(United States) Bill Scanlon	1986–1987	2	2–0	100%	1–0	0–0	1–0	0–0
(Soviet Union) Andrei Chesnokov	1983–1988	2	1–1	50%	0–1	1–0	0–0	0–0
Number 10 ranked players								
(Sweden) Mikael Pernfors	1986–1987	3	3–0	100%	1–0	2–0	0–0	0–0
(Sweden) Jonas Svensson	1986–1988	6	4–2	67%	0–0	1–1	0–0	3–1
(Argentina) Martín Jaite	1983–1987	5	3–2	60%	0–0	3–2	0–0	0–0
(France) Thierry Tulasne	1985–1989	4	2–2	50%	0–0	1–2	0–0	1–0
(Poland) Wojciech Fibak	1986	1	0–1	0%	0–0	0–0	0–0	0–1
**Total**	1983–1990	149	81–68	54.36%	25–13 (65.79%)	28–28 (50%)	5–8 (38.46%)	23–19 (54.76%)

== Top 10 wins ==
Season	1982	1983	1984	1985	1986	1987	1988	1989	1990	Total
Wins	0	0	1	6	5	7	4	1	0	24

#	Player	Rank	Event	Surface	Rd	Score	MR
1984
1.	(Sweden) Henrik Sundström	9	Palermo, Italy	Clay	2R	6–3, 6–1	73
1985
2.	(United States) Jimmy Connors	2	Philadelphia, United States	Carpet (i)	SF	5–7, 6–4, 6–3	61
3.	(Sweden) Anders Järryd	6	Rotterdam, Netherlands	Carpet (i)	2R	6–2, 7–6	32
4.	(Sweden) Anders Järryd	10	Hamburg, West Germany	Clay	QF	6–2, 6–2	25
5.	(Sweden) Mats Wilander	4	Hamburg, West Germany	Clay	SF	6–1, 6–2	25
6.	(Sweden) Mats Wilander	4	Rome, Italy	Clay	SF	6–2, 6–4	16
7.	(Sweden) Anders Järryd	6	World Team Cup, Düsseldorf, West Germany	Clay	RR	2–6, 6–3, 7–5	13
1986
8.	(Sweden) Anders Järryd	9	Brussels, Belgium	Carpet (i)	QF	6–4, 6–3	10
9.	(Sweden) Stefan Edberg	7	Wimbledon, London, United Kingdom	Grass	3R	6–4, 6–4, 6–4	30
10.	(Sweden) Mats Wilander	2	US Open, New York, United States	Hard	4R	6–7, 6–3, 6–3, 6–4	15
11.	(Sweden) Joakim Nyström	7	US Open, New York, United States	Hard	QF	6–4, 6–2, 3–6, 6–2	15
12.	(Germany) Boris Becker	3	US Open, New York, United States	Hard	SF	4–6, 6–3, 6–4, 3–6, 6–3	15
1987
13.	(Sweden) Stefan Edberg	3	Key Biscayne, United States	Hard	QF	3–6, 6–2, 6–2, 6–4	9
14.	(France) Yannick Noah	4	Key Biscayne, United States	Hard	SF	7–5, 5–1, ret.	9
15.	(Czechoslovakia) Ivan Lendl	1	Key Biscayne, United States	Hard	F	7–5, 6–2, 7–5	9
16.	(Sweden) Mats Wilander	5	Milan, Italy	Carpet (i)	SF	6–0, 6–2	6
17.	(Sweden) Mats Wilander	6	WCT Finals, Dallas, United States	Carpet (i)	QF	6–1, 6–1, 6–3	5
18.	(United States) John McEnroe	7	WCT Finals, Dallas, United States	Carpet (i)	F	6–0, 3–6, 6–2, 6–2	5
19.	(United States) John McEnroe	7	World Team Cup, Düsseldorf, West Germany	Clay	F	7–5, 2–6, 2–1, def.	5
1988
20.	(Sweden) Mats Wilander	2	Davis Cup, Norrköping, Sweden	Carpet (i)	RR	13–11, 6–3, 6–4	7
21.	(Sweden) Mats Wilander	2	Wimbledon, London, United Kingdom	Grass	QF	6–3, 6–1, 6–3	7
22.	(Sweden) Stefan Edberg	3	Summer Olympics, Seoul, South Korea	Hard	SF	3–6, 6–0, 1–6, 6–4, 6–2	12
23.	(United States) Tim Mayotte	10	Summer Olympics, Seoul, South Korea	Hard	F	3–6, 6–2, 6–4, 6–2	12
1989
24.	(United States) Jimmy Connors	8	Indian Wells, United States	Hard	SF	6–2, 6–4	13
