= 1989 Grand Prix (tennis) =

Tennis circuit edition

1989 Nabisco Grand Prix
Details
- Duration: January 2, 1989 – December 5, 1989
- Edition: 20th
- Tournaments: 73

Achievements (singles)
- Most titles: (Czechoslovakia) Ivan Lendl (10)
- Most finals: (Czechoslovakia) Ivan Lendl (12)
- Prize money leader: (Czechoslovakia) Ivan Lendl ($2,344,367)
- Points leader: (Czechoslovakia) Ivan Lendl

Awards
- Player of the year: (West Germany) Boris Becker
- Doubles team of the year: (United States) Rick Leach; (United States) Jim Pugh
- Most improved player of the year: (United States) Michael Chang
- Comeback player of the year: (Socialist Federal Republic of Yugoslavia) Goran Prpić

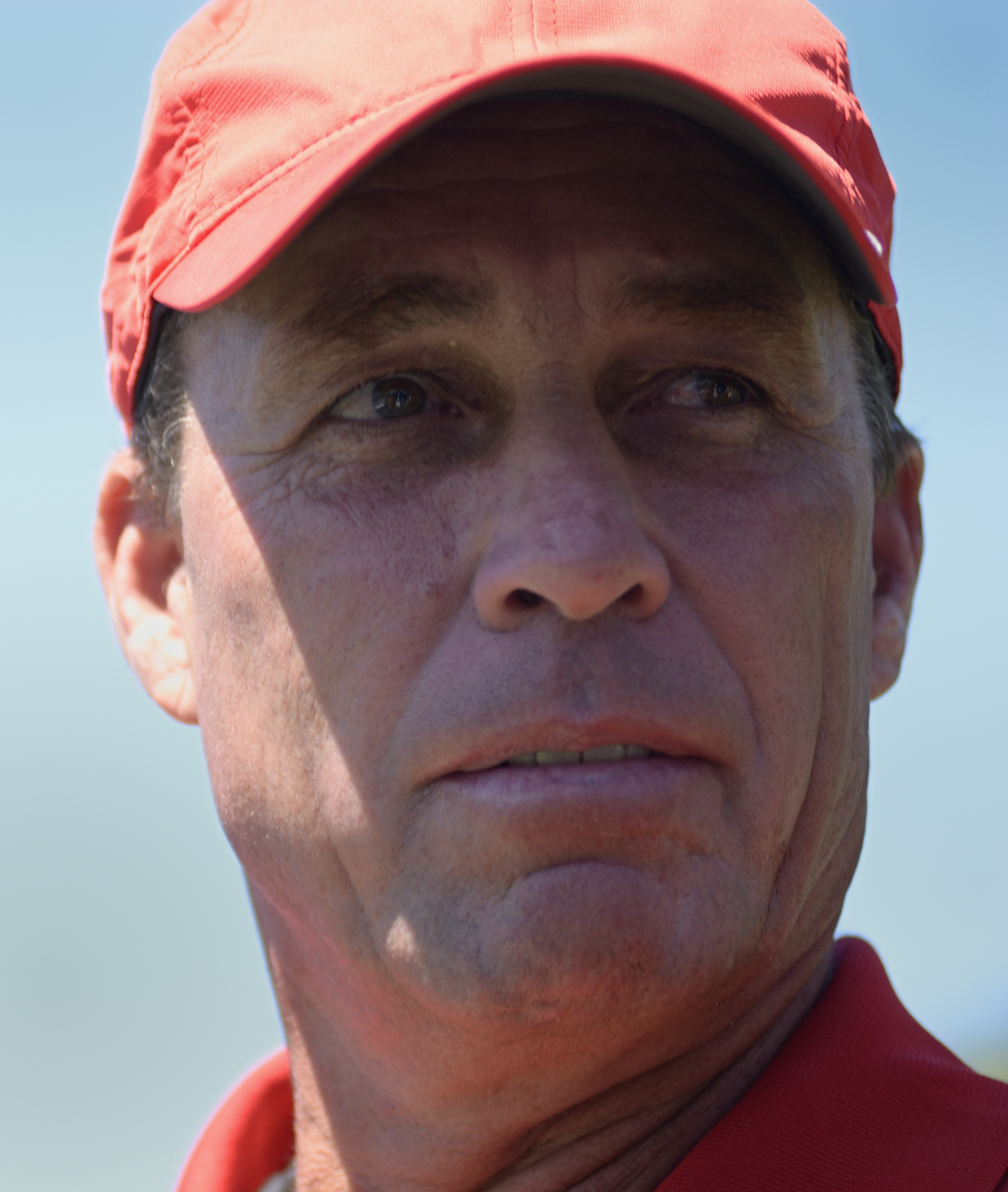
Ivan Lendl finished the year ranked ATP world No. 1 for the fourth time in his career. Lendl won ten tournaments during the season, including a major at the Australian Open, and also finished runner-up at another major, the US Open.

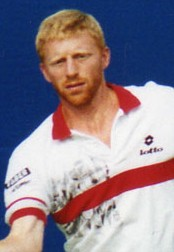
Boris Becker was named the ATP Player of the Year. Becker won five tournaments during the season, including two majors at the Wimbledon Championships and the US Open.

The 1989 Nabisco Grand Prix was the only tennis circuit for male players held that year. It incorporated the four Grand Slam tournaments, one World Championship Tennis tournament and the Grand Prix tournaments.

== Schedule ==
The table below shows the 1989 Nabisco Grand Prix (to become known in 1990 as the ATP Tour).

Grand Slam events
Grand Prix Masters
Grand Prix
Team events

=== January ===
Week	Tournament	Champions	Runners-up	Semifinalists	Quarterfinalists
26 Dec	Hopman Cup; Perth, Australia; Hopman Cup; Hard (i) – 8 teams (RR)	Czechoslovakia; 2–0	Australia	Sweden; West Germany	Japan; Yugoslavia; France; United Kingdom
2 Jan	South Australian Open; Adelaide, Australia; Hard – $93,400 – 32S/16D; Singles – Doubles	(Australia) Mark Woodforde; 7–5, 1–6, 7–5	(West Germany) Patrik Kühnen	(Soviet Union) Alexander Volkov (Finland) Veli Paloheimo	(United States) Pete Sampras (Socialist Federal Republic of Yugoslavia) Goran Ivanišević (Australia) Wally Masur (Australia) Mark Kratzmann
2 Jan	South Australian Open; Adelaide, Australia; Hard – $93,400 – 32S/16D; Singles – Doubles	(South Africa) Neil Broad (South Africa) Stefan Kruger; 6–2, 7–6	(Australia) Mark Kratzmann (United States) Glenn Layendecker	(Soviet Union) Alexander Volkov (Finland) Veli Paloheimo	(United States) Pete Sampras (Socialist Federal Republic of Yugoslavia) Goran Ivanišević (Australia) Wally Masur (Australia) Mark Kratzmann
2 Jan	BP National Championships; Wellington, New Zealand; Hard – $115,000 – 32S/16D; Singles – Doubles	(New Zealand) Kelly Evernden; 7–5, 6–1, 6–4	(Japan) Shuzo Matsuoka	(Canada) Glenn Michibata (United States) Paul Chamberlin	(West Germany) Patrick Baur (Sweden) Tobias Svantesson (Jamaica) Doug Burke (Czechoslovakia) Milan Šrejber
2 Jan	BP National Championships; Wellington, New Zealand; Hard – $115,000 – 32S/16D; Singles – Doubles	(Australia) Peter Doohan (Australia) Laurie Warder; 3–6, 6–2, 6–3	(United States) Rill Baxter (Canada) Glenn Michibata	(Canada) Glenn Michibata (United States) Paul Chamberlin	(West Germany) Patrick Baur (Sweden) Tobias Svantesson (Jamaica) Doug Burke (Czechoslovakia) Milan Šrejber
9 Jan	New South Wales Open; Sydney, Australia; Hard – $115,000 – 32S/16D; Singles – Doubles	(United States) Aaron Krickstein; 6–4, 6–2	(Soviet Union) Andrei Cherkasov	(Socialist Federal Republic of Yugoslavia) Bruno Orešar (France) Olivier Delaître	(Australia) Wally Masur (West Germany) Carl-Uwe Steeb (South Africa) Christo van Rensburg (Czechoslovakia) Libor Němeček
9 Jan	New South Wales Open; Sydney, Australia; Hard – $115,000 – 32S/16D; Singles – Doubles	(Australia) Darren Cahill (Australia) Wally Masur; 6–4, 6–3	(South Africa) Pieter Aldrich (South Africa) Danie Visser	(Socialist Federal Republic of Yugoslavia) Bruno Orešar (France) Olivier Delaître	(Australia) Wally Masur (West Germany) Carl-Uwe Steeb (South Africa) Christo van Rensburg (Czechoslovakia) Libor Němeček
9 Jan	Benson and Hedges Open; Auckland, New Zealand; Hard – $115,000 – 32S/16D; Singles – Doubles	(India) Ramesh Krishnan; 6–4, 6–0	(Israel) Amos Mansdorf	(The Bahamas) Roger Smith (United States) Richey Reneberg	(Kenya) Paul Wekesa (New Zealand) Kelly Evernden (Canada) Glenn Michibata (United States) Jim Grabb
9 Jan	Benson and Hedges Open; Auckland, New Zealand; Hard – $115,000 – 32S/16D; Singles – Doubles	(New Zealand) Steve Guy (Japan) Shuzo Matsuoka; 7–6, 7–6	(United States) John Letts (United States) Bruce Man-Son-Hing	(The Bahamas) Roger Smith (United States) Richey Reneberg	(Kenya) Paul Wekesa (New Zealand) Kelly Evernden (Canada) Glenn Michibata (United States) Jim Grabb
16 Jan; 23 Jan	Ford Australian Open; Melbourne, Australia; Grand Slam; Hard – $933,342 – 128S/64D/32X; Singles – Doubles – Mixed doubles	(Czechoslovakia) Ivan Lendl; 6–2, 6–2, 6–2	(Czechoslovakia) Miloslav Mečíř	(Sweden) Jan Gunnarsson (Austria) Thomas Muster	(Socialist Federal Republic of Yugoslavia) Goran Ivanišević (Sweden) Jonas Svensson (Sweden) Stefan Edberg (United States) John McEnroe
16 Jan; 23 Jan	Ford Australian Open; Melbourne, Australia; Grand Slam; Hard – $933,342 – 128S/64D/32X; Singles – Doubles – Mixed doubles	(United States) Rick Leach (United States) Jim Pugh; 6–4, 6–4, 6–4	(Australia) Darren Cahill (Australia) Mark Kratzmann	(Sweden) Jan Gunnarsson (Austria) Thomas Muster	(Socialist Federal Republic of Yugoslavia) Goran Ivanišević (Sweden) Jonas Svensson (Sweden) Stefan Edberg (United States) John McEnroe
16 Jan; 23 Jan	Ford Australian Open; Melbourne, Australia; Grand Slam; Hard – $933,342 – 128S/64D/32X; Singles – Doubles – Mixed doubles	(Czechoslovakia) Jana Novotná (United States) Jim Pugh; 6–3, 6–4	(United States) Zina Garrison (United States) Sherwood Stewart	(Sweden) Jan Gunnarsson (Austria) Thomas Muster	(Socialist Federal Republic of Yugoslavia) Goran Ivanišević (Sweden) Jonas Svensson (Sweden) Stefan Edberg (United States) John McEnroe
30 Jan	Davis Cup: First round Malmö, Sweden – carpet Vienna, Austria – clay (i); Belgrade, Yugoslavia – clay (i); Marbella, Spain – clay (i); Ft. Myers, Florida, United States – hard Tel Aviv, Israel – carpet (i); Prague, Czechoslovakia – carpet (i); Karlsruhe, West Germany – carpet (i)	First round winners Sweden 4–1; Austria 5–0; Yugoslavia 4–1; Spain 3–2; United States 5–0; France 4–1; Czechoslovakia 4–1; West Germany 5–0	First round losers Italy; Australia; Denmark; Mexico; Paraguay; Israel; Soviet Union; Indonesia		

=== February ===
Week	Tournament	Champions	Runners-up	Semifinalists	Quarterfinalists
6 Feb	ABN World Tennis Tournament; Rotterdam, The Netherlands; Super Series; Carpet (i) – $325,000 – 32S/16D; Singles – Doubles	(Switzerland) Jakob Hlasek; 6–1, 7–5	(Sweden) Anders Järryd	(Australia) Darren Cahill (France) Yannick Noah	(Netherlands) Michiel Schapers (United States) Martin Davis (West Germany) Udo Riglewski (West Germany) Eric Jelen
6 Feb	ABN World Tennis Tournament; Rotterdam, The Netherlands; Super Series; Carpet (i) – $325,000 – 32S/16D; Singles – Doubles	(Czechoslovakia) Miloslav Mečíř (Czechoslovakia) Milan Šrejber; 7–6, 6–0	(Sweden) Jan Gunnarsson (Sweden) Magnus Gustafsson	(Australia) Darren Cahill (France) Yannick Noah	(Netherlands) Michiel Schapers (United States) Martin Davis (West Germany) Udo Riglewski (West Germany) Eric Jelen
6 Feb	Guarujá Open; Guarujá, Brazil; Hard – $100,000 – 32S/16D; Singles – Doubles	(Brazil) Luiz Mattar; 7–6, 6–4	(United States) Jimmy Brown	(Peru) Jaime Yzaga (Brazil) Danilo Marcelino	(United States) Todd Witsken (Argentina) Eduardo Bengoechea (Brazil) Cássio Motta (Sweden) Christer Allgårdh
6 Feb	Guarujá Open; Guarujá, Brazil; Hard – $100,000 – 32S/16D; Singles – Doubles	(Brazil) Ricardo Acioly (Brazil) Dácio Campos; 7–6, 7–6	(Brazil) César Kist (Brazil) Mauro Menezes	(Peru) Jaime Yzaga (Brazil) Danilo Marcelino	(United States) Todd Witsken (Argentina) Eduardo Bengoechea (Brazil) Cássio Motta (Sweden) Christer Allgårdh
13 Feb	Stella Artois Indoor; Milan, Italy; Super Series; Carpet (i) – $375,000 – 32S/16D; Singles – Doubles	(West Germany) Boris Becker; 6–1, 6–2	(Soviet Union) Alexander Volkov	(United States) John McEnroe (West Germany) Eric Jelen	(Sweden) Christian Bergström (Soviet Union) Andrei Cherkasov (Socialist Federal Republic of Yugoslavia) Slobodan Živojinović (Italy) Paolo Canè
13 Feb	Stella Artois Indoor; Milan, Italy; Super Series; Carpet (i) – $375,000 – 32S/16D; Singles – Doubles	(Switzerland) Jakob Hlasek (United States) John McEnroe; 6–3, 6–4	(Switzerland) Heinz Günthardt (Hungary) Balázs Taróczy	(United States) John McEnroe (West Germany) Eric Jelen	(Sweden) Christian Bergström (Soviet Union) Andrei Cherkasov (Socialist Federal Republic of Yugoslavia) Slobodan Živojinović (Italy) Paolo Canè
13 Feb	Volvo Indoors; Memphis, Tennessee, United States; Super Series; Hard (i) – $297,500 – 48S/24D; Singles – Doubles	(United States) Brad Gilbert; 6–2, 6–2 ret.	(United States) Johan Kriek	(United States) Michael Chang (United States) Kevin Curren	(United States) Richey Reneberg (Australia) Broderick Dyke (United States) Jimmy Arias (United States) Jimmy Connors
13 Feb	Volvo Indoors; Memphis, Tennessee, United States; Super Series; Hard (i) – $297,500 – 48S/24D; Singles – Doubles	(United States) Paul Annacone (South Africa) Christo van Rensburg; 6–4, 6–2	(United States) Scott Davis (United States) Tim Wilkison	(United States) Michael Chang (United States) Kevin Curren	(United States) Richey Reneberg (Australia) Broderick Dyke (United States) Jimmy Arias (United States) Jimmy Connors
20 Feb	Ebel U.S. Pro Indoor; Philadelphia, United States; Super Series; Carpet (i) – $410,000 – 48S/24D; Singles – Doubles	(West Germany) Boris Becker; 7–6^{(7–4)}, 6–1, 6–3	(United States) Tim Mayotte	(United States) Andre Agassi (Sweden) Mikael Pernfors	(United States) Dan Goldie (United States) Brad Gilbert (United States) Robert Seguso (South Africa) Christo van Rensburg
20 Feb	Ebel U.S. Pro Indoor; Philadelphia, United States; Super Series; Carpet (i) – $410,000 – 48S/24D; Singles – Doubles	(United States) Paul Annacone (South Africa) Christo van Rensburg; 6–3, 7–5	(United States) Rick Leach (United States) Jim Pugh	(United States) Andre Agassi (Sweden) Mikael Pernfors	(United States) Dan Goldie (United States) Brad Gilbert (United States) Robert Seguso (South Africa) Christo van Rensburg
20 Feb	Nabisco Grand Prix de Lyon; Lyon, France; Carpet (i) – $261,000 – 32S/16D; Singles – Doubles	(United States) John McEnroe; 6–3, 7–6^{(7–3)}	(Switzerland) Jakob Hlasek	(Sweden) Anders Järryd (Sweden) Jonas Svensson	(West Germany) Patrik Kühnen (France) Henri Leconte (Sweden) Magnus Gustafsson (West Germany) Carl-Uwe Steeb
20 Feb	Nabisco Grand Prix de Lyon; Lyon, France; Carpet (i) – $261,000 – 32S/16D; Singles – Doubles	(West Germany) Eric Jelen (Denmark) Michael Mortensen; 6–2, 3–6, 6–3	(Switzerland) Jakob Hlasek (United States) John McEnroe	(Sweden) Anders Järryd (Sweden) Jonas Svensson	(West Germany) Patrik Kühnen (France) Henri Leconte (Sweden) Magnus Gustafsson (West Germany) Carl-Uwe Steeb
27 Feb	Lorraine Open; Nancy, France; Hard (i) – $100,000 – 32S/16D; Singles – Doubles	(France) Guy Forget; 6–3, 7–6^{(7–5)}	(Netherlands) Michiel Schapers	(Belgium) Eduardo Masso (United States) Paul Chamberlin	(Sweden) Johan Carlsson (France) Olivier Delaître (United Kingdom) Jeremy Bates (Haiti) Ronald Agénor
27 Feb	Lorraine Open; Nancy, France; Hard (i) – $100,000 – 32S/16D; Singles – Doubles	(West Germany) Udo Riglewski (Sweden) Tobias Svantesson; 6–4, 6–7, 7–6	(Portugal) João Cunha-Silva (Belgium) Eduardo Masso	(Belgium) Eduardo Masso (United States) Paul Chamberlin	(Sweden) Johan Carlsson (France) Olivier Delaître (United Kingdom) Jeremy Bates (Haiti) Ronald Agénor
27 Feb	WCT Finals; Dallas, Texas, United States; Carpet (i) – $500,000 – 8S; Singles	(United States) John McEnroe; 6–3, 6–3, 7–6^{(7–3)}	(United States) Brad Gilbert	(Czechoslovakia) Ivan Lendl (Sweden) Mikael Pernfors	(United States) Andre Agassi (Switzerland) Jakob Hlasek (Sweden) Stefan Edberg (Sweden) Mats Wilander

=== March ===
Week	Tournament	Champions	Runners-up	Semifinalists	Quarterfinalists
6 Mar	Eagle Classic (WCT); Scottsdale, Arizona, United States; Super Series; Hard – $297,500 – 32S/16D; Singles – Doubles	(Czechoslovakia) Ivan Lendl; 6–2, 6–3	(Sweden) Stefan Edberg	(Spain) Emilio Sánchez (Israel) Amos Mansdorf	(Socialist Federal Republic of Yugoslavia) Goran Ivanišević (United States) Jim Courier (United States) Brad Gilbert (United States) Kevin Curren
6 Mar	Eagle Classic (WCT); Scottsdale, Arizona, United States; Super Series; Hard – $297,500 – 32S/16D; Singles – Doubles	(United States) Rick Leach (United States) Jim Pugh; 6–7, 6–3, 6–2, 2–6, 6–4	(United States) Paul Annacone (South Africa) Christo van Rensburg	(Spain) Emilio Sánchez (Israel) Amos Mansdorf	(Socialist Federal Republic of Yugoslavia) Goran Ivanišević (United States) Jim Courier (United States) Brad Gilbert (United States) Kevin Curren
13 Mar	Newsweek Champions Cup; Indian Wells, California, United States; Super Series; Hard – $510,000 – 56S/28D; Singles – Doubles	(Czechoslovakia) Miloslav Mečíř; 3–6, 2–6, 6–1, 6–2, 6–3	(France) Yannick Noah	(United States) Jay Berger (United States) Jimmy Connors	(United States) Brad Gilbert (United States) Andre Agassi (United States) Tim Mayotte (United States) Michael Chang
13 Mar	Newsweek Champions Cup; Indian Wells, California, United States; Super Series; Hard – $510,000 – 56S/28D; Singles – Doubles	(West Germany) Boris Becker (Switzerland) Jakob Hlasek; 3–6, 6–3, 6–4	(United States) Kevin Curren (United States) David Pate	(United States) Jay Berger (United States) Jimmy Connors	(United States) Brad Gilbert (United States) Andre Agassi (United States) Tim Mayotte (United States) Michael Chang
20 Mar	Lipton International Championships; Key Biscayne, United States; Super Series; Hard – $745,000 – 128S/64D; Singles – Doubles	(Czechoslovakia) Ivan Lendl; W/O	(Austria) Thomas Muster	(United States) Kevin Curren (France) Yannick Noah	(United States) Aaron Krickstein (Spain) Emilio Sánchez (West Germany) Carl-Uwe Steeb (United States) Jim Grabb
20 Mar	Lipton International Championships; Key Biscayne, United States; Super Series; Hard – $745,000 – 128S/64D; Singles – Doubles	(Switzerland) Jakob Hlasek (Sweden) Anders Järryd; 6–3 ret.	(United States) Jim Grabb (United States) Patrick McEnroe	(United States) Kevin Curren (France) Yannick Noah	(United States) Aaron Krickstein (Spain) Emilio Sánchez (West Germany) Carl-Uwe Steeb (United States) Jim Grabb

=== April ===
Week	Tournament	Champions	Runners-up	Semifinalists	Quarterfinalists
3 Apr	Davis Cup: Quarterfinals; Vienna, Austria – clay (i); Split, Croatia, Yugoslavia – carpet (i); San Diego, California, United States – carpet(i); Prague, Czechoslovakia – carpet (i)	Quarterfinal winners Sweden 3–2; Yugoslavia 4–1; United States 5–0; West Germany 3–2	Quarterfinal losers Austria; Spain; France; Czechoslovakia		
10 Apr	Seoul Open; Seoul, South Korea; Hard – $93,400 – 32S/16D; Singles – Doubles	(United States) Robert Van't Hof; 7–5, 6–4	(Australia) Brad Drewett	(Australia) John Fitzgerald (New Zealand) Kelly Evernden	(France) Jean-Philippe Fleurian (South Korea) Bong-Soo Kim (India) Vijay Amritraj (United States) Paul Chamberlin
10 Apr	Seoul Open; Seoul, South Korea; Hard – $93,400 – 32S/16D; Singles – Doubles	(United States) Scott Davis (Kenya) Paul Wekesa; 6–2, 6–4	(United States) John Letts (United States) Bruce Man-Son-Hing	(Australia) John Fitzgerald (New Zealand) Kelly Evernden	(France) Jean-Philippe Fleurian (South Korea) Bong-Soo Kim (India) Vijay Amritraj (United States) Paul Chamberlin
10 Apr	Banespa Open; Rio de Janeiro, Brazil; Carpet – $200,000 – 32S/16D; Singles – Doubles	(Brazil) Luiz Mattar; 6–4, 5–7, 6–4	(Argentina) Martín Jaite	(Brazil) Cássio Motta (United States) Todd Witsken	(Sweden) Thomas Högstedt (Argentina) Eduardo Bengoechea (Argentina) Guillermo Rivas (Argentina) Horacio de la Peña
10 Apr	Banespa Open; Rio de Janeiro, Brazil; Carpet – $200,000 – 32S/16D; Singles – Doubles	(Mexico) Jorge Lozano (United States) Todd Witsken; 2–6, 6–4, 6–4	(United States) Patrick McEnroe (United States) Tim Wilkison	(Brazil) Cássio Motta (United States) Todd Witsken	(Sweden) Thomas Högstedt (Argentina) Eduardo Bengoechea (Argentina) Guillermo Rivas (Argentina) Horacio de la Peña
10 Apr	Athens Open; Athens, Greece; Clay – $93,400 – 32S/16D; Singles – Doubles	(Haiti) Ronald Agénor; 6–3, 6–4	(Sweden) Kent Carlsson	(Czechoslovakia) Josef Čihák (Argentina) Franco Davín	(France) Thierry Champion (Czechoslovakia) Martin Střelba (United States) Lawson Duncan (Italy) Francesco Cancellotti
10 Apr	Athens Open; Athens, Greece; Clay – $93,400 – 32S/16D; Singles – Doubles	(Italy) Claudio Panatta (Czechoslovakia) Tomáš Šmíd; 6–3, 6–2	(Argentina) Gustavo Giussani (Argentina) Gerardo Mirad	(Czechoslovakia) Josef Čihák (Argentina) Franco Davín	(France) Thierry Champion (Czechoslovakia) Martin Střelba (United States) Lawson Duncan (Italy) Francesco Cancellotti
17 Apr	Suntory Japan Open Championships; Tokyo, Japan; Super Series; Hard – $425,000 – 56S/28D; Singles – Doubles	(Sweden) Stefan Edberg; 6–3, 2–6, 6–4	(Czechoslovakia) Ivan Lendl	(United States) Richard Matuszewski (United States) John McEnroe	(Venezuela) Nicolás Pereira (Australia) Jason Stoltenberg (United States) Brad Gilbert (United States) Scott Davis
17 Apr	Suntory Japan Open Championships; Tokyo, Japan; Super Series; Hard – $425,000 – 56S/28D; Singles – Doubles	(United States) Ken Flach (United States) Robert Seguso; 2–6, 6–4, 6–4	(United States) Kevin Curren (United States) David Pate	(United States) Richard Matuszewski (United States) John McEnroe	(Venezuela) Nicolás Pereira (Australia) Jason Stoltenberg (United States) Brad Gilbert (United States) Scott Davis
17 Apr	Swatch Open; Nice, France; Clay – $140,000 – 32S/16D; Singles – Doubles	(Soviet Union) Andrei Chesnokov; 6–4, 6–4	(France) Jérôme Potier	(Italy) Francesco Cancellotti (Socialist Federal Republic of Yugoslavia) Goran Ivanišević	(Italy) Claudio Pistolesi (Argentina) Alberto Mancini (Argentina) Guillermo Pérez Roldán (Spain) Fernando Luna
17 Apr	Swatch Open; Nice, France; Clay – $140,000 – 32S/16D; Singles – Doubles	(West Germany) Ricki Osterthun (West Germany) Udo Riglewski; 7–6, 6–7, 6–1	(Switzerland) Heinz Günthardt (Hungary) Balázs Taróczy	(Italy) Francesco Cancellotti (Socialist Federal Republic of Yugoslavia) Goran Ivanišević	(Italy) Claudio Pistolesi (Argentina) Alberto Mancini (Argentina) Guillermo Pérez Roldán (Spain) Fernando Luna
24 Apr	Epson Singapore Super Tennis; Singapore City, Singapore; Hard – $93,400 – 32S/16D; Singles – Doubles	(United States) Kelly Jones; 6–1, 7–5	(Israel) Amos Mansdorf	(United States) Kevin Curren (Australia) Wally Masur	(United States) Jim Pugh (United States) Jim Grabb (United States) Paul Chamberlin (New Zealand) Kelly Evernden
24 Apr	Epson Singapore Super Tennis; Singapore City, Singapore; Hard – $93,400 – 32S/16D; Singles – Doubles	(United States) Rick Leach (United States) Jim Pugh; 2–6, 7–6, 6–4	(United States) Paul Chamberlin (Kenya) Paul Wekesa	(United States) Kevin Curren (Australia) Wally Masur	(United States) Jim Pugh (United States) Jim Grabb (United States) Paul Chamberlin (New Zealand) Kelly Evernden
24 Apr	Volvo Monte Carlo Open; Roquebrune-Cap-Martin, France; Super Series; Clay – $405,000 – 48S/24D; Singles – Doubles	(Argentina) Alberto Mancini; 7–5, 2–6, 7–6^{(7–4)}, 7–5	(West Germany) Boris Becker	(Sweden) Mats Wilander (Austria) Horst Skoff	(Haiti) Ronald Agénor (West Germany) Carl-Uwe Steeb (Sweden) Jan Gunnarsson (Argentina) Guillermo Pérez Roldán
24 Apr	Volvo Monte Carlo Open; Roquebrune-Cap-Martin, France; Super Series; Clay – $405,000 – 48S/24D; Singles – Doubles	(Czechoslovakia) Tomáš Šmíd (Australia) Mark Woodforde; 7–5, 6–1	(Italy) Paolo Canè (Italy) Diego Nargiso	(Sweden) Mats Wilander (Austria) Horst Skoff	(Haiti) Ronald Agénor (West Germany) Carl-Uwe Steeb (Sweden) Jan Gunnarsson (Argentina) Guillermo Pérez Roldán

=== May ===
Week	Tournament	Champions	Runners-up	Semifinalists	Quarterfinalists
1 May	Eagle Tournament of Champions (WCT); Forest Hills, New York, United States; Clay – $485,000 – 56S/28D; Singles – Doubles	(Czechoslovakia) Ivan Lendl; 6–2, 6–1	(Peru) Jaime Yzaga	(United States) Andre Agassi (United States) Michael Chang	(United States) Brad Gilbert (United States) Aaron Krickstein (Uruguay) Diego Pérez (Uruguay) Marcelo Filippini
1 May	Eagle Tournament of Champions (WCT); Forest Hills, New York, United States; Clay – $485,000 – 56S/28D; Singles – Doubles	(United States) Rick Leach (United States) Jim Pugh; 6–4, 6–2	(United States) Jim Courier (United States) Pete Sampras	(United States) Andre Agassi (United States) Michael Chang	(United States) Brad Gilbert (United States) Aaron Krickstein (Uruguay) Diego Pérez (Uruguay) Marcelo Filippini
1 May	BMW Open; Munich, West Germany; Clay – $175,000 – 48S/24D; Singles – Doubles	(Soviet Union) Andrei Chesnokov; 5–7, 7–6^{(8–6)}, 6–2	(Czechoslovakia) Martin Střelba	(Sweden) Stefan Edberg (Soviet Union) Alexander Volkov	(Argentina) Alberto Mancini (Sweden) Jonas Svensson (Argentina) Guillermo Pérez Roldán (Spain) Javier Sánchez
1 May	BMW Open; Munich, West Germany; Clay – $175,000 – 48S/24D; Singles – Doubles	(Spain) Javier Sánchez (Hungary) Balázs Taróczy; 6–3, 6–2	(Australia) Peter Doohan (Australia) Laurie Warder	(Sweden) Stefan Edberg (Soviet Union) Alexander Volkov	(Argentina) Alberto Mancini (Sweden) Jonas Svensson (Argentina) Guillermo Pérez Roldán (Spain) Javier Sánchez
8 May	Ebel German Open; Hamburg, West Germany; Super Series; Clay – $500,000 – 56S/28D; Singles – Doubles	(Czechoslovakia) Ivan Lendl; 6–4, 6–1, 6–3	(Austria) Horst Skoff	(West Germany) Carl-Uwe Steeb (West Germany) Boris Becker	(Sweden) Jonas Svensson (United States) Jimmy Connors (West Germany) Michael Westphal (Italy) Paolo Canè
8 May	Ebel German Open; Hamburg, West Germany; Super Series; Clay – $500,000 – 56S/28D; Singles – Doubles	(Spain) Emilio Sánchez (Spain) Javier Sánchez; 6–4, 6–1	(West Germany) Boris Becker (West Germany) Eric Jelen	(West Germany) Carl-Uwe Steeb (West Germany) Boris Becker	(Sweden) Jonas Svensson (United States) Jimmy Connors (West Germany) Michael Westphal (Italy) Paolo Canè
8 May	U.S. Men's Clay Court Championships; Charleston, South Carolina, United States; Clay – $190,000 – 32S/16D; Singles – Doubles	(United States) Jay Berger; 6–4, 6–3	(United States) Lawson Duncan	(United States) Tim Wilkison (Argentina) Javier Frana	(United States) Brad Gilbert (Brazil) Cássio Motta (Brazil) Luiz Mattar (United States) Michael Chang
8 May	U.S. Men's Clay Court Championships; Charleston, South Carolina, United States; Clay – $190,000 – 32S/16D; Singles – Doubles	(Sweden) Mikael Pernfors (Sweden) Tobias Svantesson; 6–4, 4–6, 7–5	(Mexico) Agustín Moreno (Peru) Jaime Yzaga	(United States) Tim Wilkison (Argentina) Javier Frana	(United States) Brad Gilbert (Brazil) Cássio Motta (Brazil) Luiz Mattar (United States) Michael Chang
15 May	Italian Open; Rome, Italy; Super Series; Clay – $807,500 – 64S/32D; Singles – Doubles	(Argentina) Alberto Mancini; 6–3, 4–6, 2–6, 7–6^{(7–2)}, 6–1	(United States) Andre Agassi	(Spain) Jordi Arrese (Spain) Sergi Bruguera	(United States) Jay Berger (Italy) Omar Camporese (Netherlands) Mark Koevermans (Argentina) Guillermo Pérez Roldán
15 May	Italian Open; Rome, Italy; Super Series; Clay – $807,500 – 64S/32D; Singles – Doubles	(United States) Jim Courier (United States) Pete Sampras; 6–4, 6–3	(Brazil) Danilo Marcelino (Brazil) Mauro Menezes	(Spain) Jordi Arrese (Spain) Sergi Bruguera	(United States) Jay Berger (Italy) Omar Camporese (Netherlands) Mark Koevermans (Argentina) Guillermo Pérez Roldán
22 May	Torneo Internazionale Città di Firenze; Florence, Italy; Clay – $93,400 – 32S/16D; Singles – Doubles	(Argentina) Horacio de la Peña; 6–4, 6–3	(Socialist Federal Republic of Yugoslavia) Goran Ivanišević	(Ecuador) Andrés Gómez (United States) Lawson Duncan	(Italy) Omar Camporese (Argentina) Eduardo Bengoechea (Brazil) Luiz Mattar (France) Thierry Tulasne
22 May	Torneo Internazionale Città di Firenze; Florence, Italy; Clay – $93,400 – 32S/16D; Singles – Doubles	(United States) Mike De Palmer (United States) Blaine Willenborg; 4–6, 6–4, 6–4	(Italy) Pietro Pennisi (Italy) Simone Restelli	(Ecuador) Andrés Gómez (United States) Lawson Duncan	(Italy) Omar Camporese (Argentina) Eduardo Bengoechea (Brazil) Luiz Mattar (France) Thierry Tulasne
29 May; 5 Jun	French Open; Paris, France; Grand Slam; Clay – $1,945,000 – 128S/64D/32X; Singles – Doubles – Mixed doubles	(United States) Michael Chang; 6–1, 3–6, 4–6, 6–4, 6–2	(Sweden) Stefan Edberg	(Soviet Union) Andrei Chesnokov (West Germany) Boris Becker	(Haiti) Ronald Agénor (Sweden) Mats Wilander (Argentina) Alberto Mancini (United States) Jay Berger
29 May; 5 Jun	French Open; Paris, France; Grand Slam; Clay – $1,945,000 – 128S/64D/32X; Singles – Doubles – Mixed doubles	(United States) Jim Grabb (United States) Patrick McEnroe; 6–4, 2–6, 6–4, 7–6^{(7–5)}	(Iran) Mansour Bahrami (France) Éric Winogradsky	(Soviet Union) Andrei Chesnokov (West Germany) Boris Becker	(Haiti) Ronald Agénor (Sweden) Mats Wilander (Argentina) Alberto Mancini (United States) Jay Berger
29 May; 5 Jun	French Open; Paris, France; Grand Slam; Clay – $1,945,000 – 128S/64D/32X; Singles – Doubles – Mixed doubles	(Netherlands) Manon Bollegraf (Netherlands) Tom Nijssen; 6–3, 6–7, 6–2	(Spain) Arantxa Sánchez Vicario (Argentina) Horacio de la Peña	(Soviet Union) Andrei Chesnokov (West Germany) Boris Becker	(Haiti) Ronald Agénor (Sweden) Mats Wilander (Argentina) Alberto Mancini (United States) Jay Berger

=== June ===
Week	Tournament	Champions	Runners-up	Semifinalists	Quarterfinalists
12 Jun	Stella Artois Championships; London, Great Britain; Grass – $350,000 – 64S/32D; Singles – Doubles	(Czechoslovakia) Ivan Lendl; 4–6, 6–3, 6–4	(South Africa) Christo van Rensburg	(United States) Paul Annacone (United States) Derrick Rostagno	(West Germany) Michael Stich (Sweden) Mats Wilander (South Africa) Gary Muller (United Kingdom) Chris Bailey
12 Jun	Stella Artois Championships; London, Great Britain; Grass – $350,000 – 64S/32D; Singles – Doubles	(Australia) Darren Cahill (Australia) Mark Kratzmann; 7–6, 6–3	(United States) Tim Pawsat (Australia) Laurie Warder	(United States) Paul Annacone (United States) Derrick Rostagno	(West Germany) Michael Stich (Sweden) Mats Wilander (South Africa) Gary Muller (United Kingdom) Chris Bailey
12 Jun	Bologna Open; Bologna, Italy; Clay – $93,400 – 32S/16D; Singles – Doubles	(Spain) Javier Sánchez; 6–1, 6–0	(Argentina) Franco Davín	(Argentina) Guillermo Pérez Roldán (Argentina) Roberto Azar	(Italy) Omar Camporese (Uruguay) Diego Pérez (Haiti) Ronald Agénor (Italy) Paolo Pambianco
12 Jun	Bologna Open; Bologna, Italy; Clay – $93,400 – 32S/16D; Singles – Doubles	(Spain) Sergio Casal (Spain) Javier Sánchez; 6–2, 6–3	(Sweden) Tomas Nydahl (Sweden) Jörgen Windahl	(Argentina) Guillermo Pérez Roldán (Argentina) Roberto Azar	(Italy) Omar Camporese (Uruguay) Diego Pérez (Haiti) Ronald Agénor (Italy) Paolo Pambianco
19 Jun	Bristol Trophy; Bristol, Great Britain; Grass – $100,000 – 32S/16D; Singles – Doubles	(West Germany) Eric Jelen; 6–4, 3–6, 7–5	(United Kingdom) Nick Brown	(Netherlands) Michiel Schapers (United States) Richard Matuszewski	(United States) Derrick Rostagno (New Zealand) Kelly Evernden (West Germany) Michael Stich (Australia) Brad Drewett
19 Jun	Bristol Trophy; Bristol, Great Britain; Grass – $100,000 – 32S/16D; Singles – Doubles	(United States) Paul Chamberlin (United States) Tim Wilkison; 7–6^{(8–6)}, 6–4	(United States) Mike De Palmer (United States) Gary Donnelly	(Netherlands) Michiel Schapers (United States) Richard Matuszewski	(United States) Derrick Rostagno (New Zealand) Kelly Evernden (West Germany) Michael Stich (Australia) Brad Drewett
19 Jun	Bari, Italy; Clay – $93,400 – 32S/16D	(Spain) Juan Aguilera; 4–6 6–3 6–4	(Czechoslovakia) Marián Vajda	(Switzerland) Claudio Mezzadri (Peru) Alejandro Aramburú	(Argentina) Franco Davín (Chile) Pedro Rebolledo (Spain) Sergio Casal (Switzerland) Marc Rosset
19 Jun	Bari, Italy; Clay – $93,400 – 32S/16D	(Italy) Simone Colombo (Switzerland) Claudio Mezzadri; 0–6, 6–3, 6–3	(Spain) Sergio Casal (Spain) Javier Sánchez	(Switzerland) Claudio Mezzadri (Peru) Alejandro Aramburú	(Argentina) Franco Davín (Chile) Pedro Rebolledo (Spain) Sergio Casal (Switzerland) Marc Rosset
26 Jun; 3 Jul	Wimbledon Championships; London, Great Britain; Grand Slam; Grass – $2,204,162 – 128S/64D/32X; Singles – Doubles – Mixed doubles	(West Germany) Boris Becker; 6–0, 7–6^{(7–1)}, 6–4	(Sweden) Stefan Edberg	(Czechoslovakia) Ivan Lendl (United States) John McEnroe	(United States) Dan Goldie (United States) Paul Chamberlin (Sweden) Mats Wilander (United States) Tim Mayotte
26 Jun; 3 Jul	Wimbledon Championships; London, Great Britain; Grand Slam; Grass – $2,204,162 – 128S/64D/32X; Singles – Doubles – Mixed doubles	(Australia) John Fitzgerald (Sweden) Anders Järryd; 3–6, 7–6^{(7–4)}, 6–4, 7–6^{(7–4)}	(United States) Rick Leach (United States) Jim Pugh	(Czechoslovakia) Ivan Lendl (United States) John McEnroe	(United States) Dan Goldie (United States) Paul Chamberlin (Sweden) Mats Wilander (United States) Tim Mayotte
26 Jun; 3 Jul	Wimbledon Championships; London, Great Britain; Grand Slam; Grass – $2,204,162 – 128S/64D/32X; Singles – Doubles – Mixed doubles	(Czechoslovakia) Jana Novotná (United States) Jim Pugh; 6–4, 5–7, 6–4	(Australia) Jenny Byrne (Australia) Mark Kratzmann	(Czechoslovakia) Ivan Lendl (United States) John McEnroe	(United States) Dan Goldie (United States) Paul Chamberlin (Sweden) Mats Wilander (United States) Tim Mayotte

=== July ===
Week	Tournament	Champions	Runners-up	Semifinalists	Quarterfinalists
10 Jul	Shawmut US Pro Championships; Boston, United States; Super Series; Clay – $415,000 – 56S/28D; Singles – Doubles	(Ecuador) Andrés Gómez; 6–1, 6–4	(Sweden) Mats Wilander	(United States) Andre Agassi (Argentina) Martín Jaite	(Peru) Jaime Yzaga (United States) Jay Berger (Argentina) Eduardo Bengoechea (Spain) Jordi Arrese
10 Jul	Shawmut US Pro Championships; Boston, United States; Super Series; Clay – $415,000 – 56S/28D; Singles – Doubles	(Ecuador) Andrés Gómez (Argentina) Alberto Mancini; 3–6, 6–3, 6–4	(United States) Todd Nelson (United States) Phillip Williamson	(United States) Andre Agassi (Argentina) Martín Jaite	(Peru) Jaime Yzaga (United States) Jay Berger (Argentina) Eduardo Bengoechea (Spain) Jordi Arrese
10 Jul	Rado Swiss Open; Gstaad, Switzerland; Clay – $275,000 – 32S/16D; Singles – Doubles	(West Germany) Carl-Uwe Steeb; 6–7^{(6–8)}, 3–6, 6–2, 6–4, 6–2	(Sweden) Magnus Gustafsson	(Sweden) Jan Gunnarsson (Spain) Sergi Bruguera	(United States) Todd Witsken (Argentina) Horacio de la Peña (West Germany) Udo Riglewski (United States) Aaron Krickstein
10 Jul	Rado Swiss Open; Gstaad, Switzerland; Clay – $275,000 – 32S/16D; Singles – Doubles	(Brazil) Cássio Motta (United States) Todd Witsken; 6–4, 6–3	(Czechoslovakia) Petr Korda (Czechoslovakia) Milan Šrejber	(Sweden) Jan Gunnarsson (Spain) Sergi Bruguera	(United States) Todd Witsken (Argentina) Horacio de la Peña (West Germany) Udo Riglewski (United States) Aaron Krickstein
10 Jul	Volvo Hall of Fame Tennis Championships; Newport, Rhode Island, United States; Grass – $125,000 – 32S/16D; Singles – Doubles	(United States) Jim Pugh; 6–4, 4–6, 6–2	(Sweden) Peter Lundgren	(United States) Glenn Layendecker (South Africa) Danie Visser	(United States) Paul Annacone (Australia) John Fitzgerald (West Germany) Christian Saceanu (United States) Johan Kriek
10 Jul	Volvo Hall of Fame Tennis Championships; Newport, Rhode Island, United States; Grass – $125,000 – 32S/16D; Singles – Doubles	(United States) Patrick Galbraith (United States) Brian Garrow; 2–6, 7–5, 6–3	(South Africa) Neil Broad (South Africa) Stefan Kruger	(United States) Glenn Layendecker (South Africa) Danie Visser	(United States) Paul Annacone (Australia) John Fitzgerald (West Germany) Christian Saceanu (United States) Johan Kriek
17 Jul	OTB Open; Schenectady, New York, United States; Hard – $100,000 – 32S/16D; Singles – Doubles	(Australia) Simon Youl; 2–6, 6–4, 6–4	(United States) Scott Davis	(United States) Dan Goldie (Canada) Glenn Michibata	(United States) Jeff Tarango (United States) Scott Warner (India) Ramesh Krishnan (Canada) Chris Pridham
17 Jul	OTB Open; Schenectady, New York, United States; Hard – $100,000 – 32S/16D; Singles – Doubles	(United States) Scott Davis (Australia) Broderick Dyke; 2–6, 6–4, 6–4	(United States) Brad Pearce (South Africa) Byron Talbot	(United States) Dan Goldie (Canada) Glenn Michibata	(United States) Jeff Tarango (United States) Scott Warner (India) Ramesh Krishnan (Canada) Chris Pridham
17 Jul	Davis Cup: Semifinals; Båstad, Sweden – clay Munich, West Germany – carpet (i)	Semifinal winners Sweden 4–1; West Germany 3–2	Semifinal losers Yugoslavia; United States		
24 Jul	Dutch Open; Hilversum, Netherlands; Clay – $150,000 – 32S/16D; Singles – Doubles	(Czechoslovakia) Karel Nováček; 6–2, 6–4	(Spain) Emilio Sánchez	(Spain) Tomás Carbonell (Italy) Paolo Canè	(Netherlands) Paul Haarhuis (Austria) Horst Skoff (Soviet Union) Andrei Chesnokov (Argentina) Franco Davín
24 Jul	Dutch Open; Hilversum, Netherlands; Clay – $150,000 – 32S/16D; Singles – Doubles	(Netherlands) Paul Haarhuis (Netherlands) Mark Koevermans; Not played (rain)	(Spain) Tomás Carbonell (Uruguay) Diego Pérez	(Spain) Tomás Carbonell (Italy) Paolo Canè	(Netherlands) Paul Haarhuis (Austria) Horst Skoff (Soviet Union) Andrei Chesnokov (Argentina) Franco Davín
24 Jul	Mercedes Cup; Stuttgart, West Germany; Clay – $275,000 – 48S/24D; Singles – Doubles	(Argentina) Martín Jaite; 6–3, 6–2	(Socialist Federal Republic of Yugoslavia) Goran Prpić	(West Germany) Jens Wöhrmann (Spain) Sergi Bruguera	(Argentina) Guillermo Pérez Roldán (Spain) Jordi Arrese (Austria) Alex Antonitsch (Canada) Martin Wostenholme
24 Jul	Mercedes Cup; Stuttgart, West Germany; Clay – $275,000 – 48S/24D; Singles – Doubles	(Czechoslovakia) Petr Korda (Czechoslovakia) Tomáš Šmíd; 6–7, 6–3, 6–1	(Romania) Florin Segărceanu (Czechoslovakia) Cyril Suk	(West Germany) Jens Wöhrmann (Spain) Sergi Bruguera	(Argentina) Guillermo Pérez Roldán (Spain) Jordi Arrese (Austria) Alex Antonitsch (Canada) Martin Wostenholme
24 Jul	Sovran Bank Classic; Washington, D.C., United States; Super Series; Hard – $297,500 – 56S/28D; Singles – Doubles	(United States) Tim Mayotte; 3–6, 6–4, 7–5	(United States) Brad Gilbert	(United States) Todd Witsken (United States) Richey Reneberg	(Australia) Simon Youl (United States) Jim Grabb (India) Ramesh Krishnan (United States) Paul Chamberlin
24 Jul	Sovran Bank Classic; Washington, D.C., United States; Super Series; Hard – $297,500 – 56S/28D; Singles – Doubles	(South Africa) Neil Broad (South Africa) Gary Muller; 7–6, 6–1	(United States) Jim Grabb (United States) Patrick McEnroe	(United States) Todd Witsken (United States) Richey Reneberg	(Australia) Simon Youl (United States) Jim Grabb (India) Ramesh Krishnan (United States) Paul Chamberlin
31 Jul	Volvo International; Stratton Mountain, Vermont, United States; Super Series; Hard – $602,500 – 64S/32D; Singles – Doubles	(United States) Brad Gilbert; 7–5, 6–0	(United States) Jim Pugh	(United States) David Wheaton (United States) Jim Grabb	(United States) Jim Courier (United States) Glenn Layendecker (United States) Robert Seguso (United States) Michael Chang
31 Jul	Volvo International; Stratton Mountain, Vermont, United States; Super Series; Hard – $602,500 – 64S/32D; Singles – Doubles	(Australia) Mark Kratzmann (Australia) Wally Masur; 6–3, 4–6, 7–6	(South Africa) Pieter Aldrich (South Africa) Danie Visser	(United States) David Wheaton (United States) Jim Grabb	(United States) Jim Courier (United States) Glenn Layendecker (United States) Robert Seguso (United States) Michael Chang
31 Jul	Head Cup; Kitzbühel, Austria; Clay – $300,000 – 64S/32D; Singles – Doubles	(Spain) Emilio Sánchez; 7–6^{(7–5)}, 6–1, 2–6, 6–2	(Argentina) Martín Jaite	(Socialist Federal Republic of Yugoslavia) Goran Prpić (Spain) Javier Sánchez	(Spain) Francisco Clavet (Czechoslovakia) Marián Vajda (Spain) Sergi Bruguera (Czechoslovakia) Martin Střelba
31 Jul	Head Cup; Kitzbühel, Austria; Clay – $300,000 – 64S/32D; Singles – Doubles	(Spain) Emilio Sánchez (Spain) Javier Sánchez; 7–5, 7–6	(Czechoslovakia) Petr Korda (Czechoslovakia) Tomáš Šmíd	(Socialist Federal Republic of Yugoslavia) Goran Prpić (Spain) Javier Sánchez	(Spain) Francisco Clavet (Czechoslovakia) Marián Vajda (Spain) Sergi Bruguera (Czechoslovakia) Martin Střelba
31 Jul	Volvo Open; Båstad, Sweden; Clay – $275,000 – 32S/16D; Singles – Doubles	(Italy) Paolo Canè; 7–6^{(7–4)}, 7–6^{(7–5)}	(Socialist Federal Republic of Yugoslavia) Bruno Orešar	(Australia) Johan Anderson (Sweden) Nicklas Kulti	(Sweden) Magnus Gustafsson (Czechoslovakia) Karel Nováček (Sweden) Christian Bergström (Sweden) Joakim Nyström
31 Jul	Volvo Open; Båstad, Sweden; Clay – $275,000 – 32S/16D; Singles – Doubles	(Sweden) Per Henricsson (Sweden) Nicklas Utgren; 7–5, 6–2	(Czechoslovakia) Josef Čihák (Czechoslovakia) Karel Nováček	(Australia) Johan Anderson (Sweden) Nicklas Kulti	(Sweden) Magnus Gustafsson (Czechoslovakia) Karel Nováček (Sweden) Christian Bergström (Sweden) Joakim Nyström

=== August ===
Week	Tournament	Champions	Runners-up	Semifinalists	Quarterfinalists
7 Aug	Swiss Army Knife Open; Livingston, New Jersey, United States; Hard – $93,400 – 32S/16D; Singles – Doubles	(United States) Brad Gilbert; 6–4, 6–4	(Australia) Jason Stoltenberg	(United Kingdom) Chris Bailey (United States) Jim Courier	(United States) Tim Donovan (United States) Mike Brown (United States) Jim Grabb (India) Ramesh Krishnan
7 Aug	Swiss Army Knife Open; Livingston, New Jersey, United States; Hard – $93,400 – 32S/16D; Singles – Doubles	(United States) Tim Pawsat (United States) Tim Wilkison; 7–5, 6–3	(New Zealand) Kelly Evernden (United States) Sammy Giammalva	(United Kingdom) Chris Bailey (United States) Jim Courier	(United States) Tim Donovan (United States) Mike Brown (United States) Jim Grabb (India) Ramesh Krishnan
7 Aug	Czechoslovak Open; Prague, Czechoslovakia; Clay – $140,000 – 32S/16D; Singles – Doubles	(Uruguay) Marcelo Filippini; 7–5, 7–6^{(7–4)}	(Austria) Horst Skoff	(Denmark) Michael Tauson (Argentina) Franco Davín	(Czechoslovakia) Petr Korda (Czechoslovakia) Martin Střelba (Spain) Juan Aguilera (Socialist Federal Republic of Yugoslavia) Marko Ostoja
7 Aug	Czechoslovak Open; Prague, Czechoslovakia; Clay – $140,000 – 32S/16D; Singles – Doubles	(Spain) Jordi Arrese (Austria) Horst Skoff; 6–4, 6–4	(Czechoslovakia) Petr Korda (Czechoslovakia) Tomáš Šmíd	(Denmark) Michael Tauson (Argentina) Franco Davín	(Czechoslovakia) Petr Korda (Czechoslovakia) Martin Střelba (Spain) Juan Aguilera (Socialist Federal Republic of Yugoslavia) Marko Ostoja
7 Aug	U.S. Men's Hard Court Championships; Indianapolis, United States; Super Series; Hard – $300,000 – 56S/28D; Singles – Doubles	(United States) John McEnroe; 6–4, 4–6, 6–4	(United States) Jay Berger	(Sweden) Stefan Edberg (United States) Aaron Krickstein	(United States) Richard Matuszewski (United States) Tim Mayotte (United States) Pete Sampras (United States) Todd Witsken
7 Aug	U.S. Men's Hard Court Championships; Indianapolis, United States; Super Series; Hard – $300,000 – 56S/28D; Singles – Doubles	(South Africa) Pieter Aldrich (South Africa) Danie Visser; 7–5, 7–6	(Australia) Peter Doohan (Australia) Laurie Warder	(Sweden) Stefan Edberg (United States) Aaron Krickstein	(United States) Richard Matuszewski (United States) Tim Mayotte (United States) Pete Sampras (United States) Todd Witsken
14 Aug	Players International Canadian Open; Montreal, Quebec, Canada; Super Series; Hard – $550,000 – 56S/28D; Singles – Doubles	(Czechoslovakia) Ivan Lendl; 6–1, 6–3	(United States) John McEnroe	(United States) Andre Agassi (United States) Jay Berger	(Canada) Grant Connell (Canada) Andrew Sznajder (Venezuela) Nicolás Pereira (Austria) Alex Antonitsch
14 Aug	Players International Canadian Open; Montreal, Quebec, Canada; Super Series; Hard – $550,000 – 56S/28D; Singles – Doubles	(New Zealand) Kelly Evernden (United States) Todd Witsken; 7–6, 1–6, 7–6	(United States) Charles Beckman (United States) Shelby Cannon	(United States) Andre Agassi (United States) Jay Berger	(Canada) Grant Connell (Canada) Andrew Sznajder (Venezuela) Nicolás Pereira (Austria) Alex Antonitsch
14 Aug	Thriftway ATP Championships; Mason, United States; Super Series; Hard – $485,000 – 64S/32D; Singles – Doubles	(United States) Brad Gilbert; 6–4, 2–6, 7–6^{(7–5)}	(Sweden) Stefan Edberg	(West Germany) Boris Becker (Sweden) Mats Wilander	(Peru) Jaime Yzaga (United States) Michael Chang (Ecuador) Andrés Gómez (Sweden) Jonas Svensson
14 Aug	Thriftway ATP Championships; Mason, United States; Super Series; Hard – $485,000 – 64S/32D; Singles – Doubles	(United States) Ken Flach (United States) Robert Seguso; 6–4, 6–4	(South Africa) Pieter Aldrich (South Africa) Danie Visser	(West Germany) Boris Becker (Sweden) Mats Wilander	(Peru) Jaime Yzaga (United States) Michael Chang (Ecuador) Andrés Gómez (Sweden) Jonas Svensson
14 Aug	Campionati Internazionali della Valle D'Aosta; St. Vincent, Italy; Clay – $125,000 – 32S/16D; Singles – Doubles	(Argentina) Franco Davín; 6–2, 6–2	(Spain) Juan Aguilera	(Italy) Claudio Pistolesi (Spain) Tomás Carbonell	(Argentina) Roberto Argüello (Argentina) Gustavo Giussani (Uruguay) Marcelo Filippini (Soviet Union) Andres Võsand
14 Aug	Campionati Internazionali della Valle D'Aosta; St. Vincent, Italy; Clay – $125,000 – 32S/16D; Singles – Doubles	(Czechoslovakia) Josef Čihák (Czechoslovakia) Cyril Suk; 6–4, 6–2	(Italy) Massimo Cierro (Italy) Alessandro de Minicis	(Italy) Claudio Pistolesi (Spain) Tomás Carbonell	(Argentina) Roberto Argüello (Argentina) Gustavo Giussani (Uruguay) Marcelo Filippini (Soviet Union) Andres Võsand
21 Aug	Campionati Internazionali di San Marino; San Marino, San Marino; Clay – $93,400 – 32S/16D	(Spain) José Francisco Altur; 6–4, 6–1	(Argentina) Roberto Azar	(United States) Lawson Duncan (Spain) Jose-Luis Aparisi	(Italy) Massimo Cierro (Argentina) Franco Davín (Italy) Simone Colombo (Italy) Renzo Furlan
21 Aug	Campionati Internazionali di San Marino; San Marino, San Marino; Clay – $93,400 – 32S/16D	(Italy) Simone Colombo (Switzerland) Claudio Mezzadri; 6–1, 4–6, 7–6	(Argentina) Pablo Albano (Argentina) Gustavo Luza	(United States) Lawson Duncan (Spain) Jose-Luis Aparisi	(Italy) Massimo Cierro (Argentina) Franco Davín (Italy) Simone Colombo (Italy) Renzo Furlan
28 Aug; 4 Sep	US Open; New York United States; Grand Slam; Hard – $2,000,000 – 128S/64D/32X; Singles – Doubles – Mixed doubles	(West Germany) Boris Becker; 7–6^{(7–2)}, 1–6, 6–3, 7–6^{(7–4)}	(Czechoslovakia) Ivan Lendl	(United States) Andre Agassi (United States) Aaron Krickstein	(United States) Tim Mayotte (United States) Jimmy Connors (United States) Jay Berger (France) Yannick Noah
28 Aug; 4 Sep	US Open; New York United States; Grand Slam; Hard – $2,000,000 – 128S/64D/32X; Singles – Doubles – Mixed doubles	(United States) John McEnroe (Australia) Mark Woodforde; 6–4, 4–6, 6–3, 6–3	(United States) Ken Flach (United States) Robert Seguso	(United States) Andre Agassi (United States) Aaron Krickstein	(United States) Tim Mayotte (United States) Jimmy Connors (United States) Jay Berger (France) Yannick Noah
28 Aug; 4 Sep	US Open; New York United States; Grand Slam; Hard – $2,000,000 – 128S/64D/32X; Singles – Doubles – Mixed doubles	(United States) Robin White (United States) Shelby Cannon; 3–6, 6–2, 7–5	(United States) Meredith McGrath (United States) Rick Leach	(United States) Andre Agassi (United States) Aaron Krickstein	(United States) Tim Mayotte (United States) Jimmy Connors (United States) Jay Berger (France) Yannick Noah

=== September ===
Week	Tournament	Champions	Runners-up	Semifinalists	Quarterfinalists
11 Sep	Geneva Open; Geneva, Switzerland; Clay – $190,000 – 32S/16D; Singles – Doubles	(Switzerland) Marc Rosset; 6–4, 7–5	(Argentina) Guillermo Pérez Roldán	(Argentina) Eduardo Bengoechea (Argentina) Francisco Yunis	(Belgium) Xavier Daufresne (Sweden) Lars Jönsson (Spain) Juan Aguilera (Chile) Sergio Cortés
11 Sep	Geneva Open; Geneva, Switzerland; Clay – $190,000 – 32S/16D; Singles – Doubles	(Ecuador) Andrés Gómez (Argentina) Alberto Mancini; 6–3, 7–5	(Iran) Mansour Bahrami (Argentina) Guillermo Pérez Roldán	(Argentina) Eduardo Bengoechea (Argentina) Francisco Yunis	(Belgium) Xavier Daufresne (Sweden) Lars Jönsson (Spain) Juan Aguilera (Chile) Sergio Cortés
11 Sep	Grand Prix Villa de Madrid; Madrid, Spain; Clay – $175,000 – 32S/16D; Singles – Doubles	(Argentina) Martín Jaite; 6–3, 6–2	(Spain) Jordi Arrese	(Spain) Sergio Casal (Spain) Javier Sánchez	(Spain) Tomás Carbonell (Brazil) Luiz Mattar (Austria) Horst Skoff (Uruguay) Diego Pérez
11 Sep	Grand Prix Villa de Madrid; Madrid, Spain; Clay – $175,000 – 32S/16D; Singles – Doubles	(Spain) Tomás Carbonell (Spain) Carlos Costa; 7–5, 6–3	(Spain) Francisco Clavet (Czechoslovakia) Tomáš Šmíd	(Spain) Sergio Casal (Spain) Javier Sánchez	(Spain) Tomás Carbonell (Brazil) Luiz Mattar (Austria) Horst Skoff (Uruguay) Diego Pérez
18 Sep	Torneo Godó; Barcelona, Spain; Super Series; Clay – $375,000 – 56S/28D; Singles – Doubles	(Ecuador) Andrés Gómez; 6–4, 6–4, 6–2	(Austria) Horst Skoff	(Czechoslovakia) Ivan Lendl (Argentina) Alberto Mancini	(Uruguay) Marcelo Filippini (Argentina) Martín Jaite (West Germany) Carl-Uwe Steeb (Austria) Thomas Muster
18 Sep	Torneo Godó; Barcelona, Spain; Super Series; Clay – $375,000 – 56S/28D; Singles – Doubles	(Argentina) Gustavo Luza (Argentina) Christian Miniussi; 7–6, 5–7, 6–3	(Spain) Sergio Casal (Czechoslovakia) Tomáš Šmíd	(Czechoslovakia) Ivan Lendl (Argentina) Alberto Mancini	(Uruguay) Marcelo Filippini (Argentina) Martín Jaite (West Germany) Carl-Uwe Steeb (Austria) Thomas Muster
18 Sep	Countrywide Classic; Los Angeles, United States; Super Series; Hard – $297,500 – 32S/16D; Singles – Doubles	(United States) Aaron Krickstein; 2–6, 6–4, 6–2	(United States) Michael Chang	(United States) Scott Davis (United States) Brad Gilbert	(Australia) Darren Cahill (United States) Kevin Curren (Canada) Andrew Sznajder (Sweden) Mikael Pernfors
18 Sep	Countrywide Classic; Los Angeles, United States; Super Series; Hard – $297,500 – 32S/16D; Singles – Doubles	(United States) Marty Davis (United States) Tim Pawsat; 7–5, 7–6	(Australia) John Fitzgerald (Sweden) Anders Järryd	(United States) Scott Davis (United States) Brad Gilbert	(Australia) Darren Cahill (United States) Kevin Curren (Canada) Andrew Sznajder (Sweden) Mikael Pernfors
25 Sep	Volvo Tennis San Francisco; Super Series; San Francisco, United States; Carpet (i) – $297,500 – 32S/16D; Singles – Doubles	(United States) Brad Gilbert; 7–5, 6–2	(Sweden) Anders Järryd	(United States) Kevin Curren (New Zealand) Kelly Evernden	(United States) Derrick Rostagno (United States) Jim Grabb (South Africa) Christo van Rensburg (United States) Michael Chang
25 Sep	Volvo Tennis San Francisco; Super Series; San Francisco, United States; Carpet (i) – $297,500 – 32S/16D; Singles – Doubles	(South Africa) Pieter Aldrich (South Africa) Danie Visser; 6–4, 6–3	(United States) Paul Annacone (South Africa) Christo van Rensburg	(United States) Kevin Curren (New Zealand) Kelly Evernden	(United States) Derrick Rostagno (United States) Jim Grabb (South Africa) Christo van Rensburg (United States) Michael Chang
25 Sep	Bordeaux Open; Bordeaux, France; Clay – $225,000 – 32S/16D; Singles – Doubles	(Czechoslovakia) Ivan Lendl; 6–2, 6–2	(Spain) Emilio Sánchez	(Peru) Jaime Yzaga (France) Jean-Philippe Fleurian	(France) Henri Leconte (Brazil) Cássio Motta (Socialist Federal Republic of Yugoslavia) Goran Prpić (Spain) Tomás Carbonell
25 Sep	Bordeaux Open; Bordeaux, France; Clay – $225,000 – 32S/16D; Singles – Doubles	(Spain) Tomás Carbonell (Peru) Carlos di Laura; 6–4, 6–3	(Mexico) Agustín Moreno (Peru) Jaime Yzaga	(Peru) Jaime Yzaga (France) Jean-Philippe Fleurian	(France) Henri Leconte (Brazil) Cássio Motta (Socialist Federal Republic of Yugoslavia) Goran Prpić (Spain) Tomás Carbonell
25 Sep	Campionati Internazionali di Sicilia; Palermo, Italy; Clay – $225,000 – 32S/16D; Singles – Doubles	(Argentina) Guillermo Pérez Roldán; 6–1, 6–4	(Italy) Paolo Canè	(Socialist Federal Republic of Yugoslavia) Goran Ivanišević (West Germany) Pavel Vojtíšek	(Argentina) Alberto Mancini (West Germany) Peter Ballauff (Spain) Sergi Bruguera (Italy) Claudio Pistolesi
25 Sep	Campionati Internazionali di Sicilia; Palermo, Italy; Clay – $225,000 – 32S/16D; Singles – Doubles	(West Germany) Peter Ballauff (West Germany) Rüdiger Haas; 6–2, 6–7, 6–4	(Socialist Federal Republic of Yugoslavia) Goran Ivanišević (Italy) Diego Nargiso	(Socialist Federal Republic of Yugoslavia) Goran Ivanišević (West Germany) Pavel Vojtíšek	(Argentina) Alberto Mancini (West Germany) Peter Ballauff (Spain) Sergi Bruguera (Italy) Claudio Pistolesi

=== October ===
Week	Tournament	Champions	Runners-up	Semifinalists	Quarterfinalists
2 Oct	Queensland Open; Brisbane, Australia; Hard – $150,000 – 32S/16D	(Sweden) Niclas Kroon; 4–6, 6–2, 6–4	(Australia) Mark Woodforde	(Australia) Todd Woodbridge (Australia) Wally Masur	(Australia) Darren Cahill (West Germany) Eric Jelen (Australia) Jason Stoltenberg (Australia) Shane Barr
2 Oct	Queensland Open; Brisbane, Australia; Hard – $150,000 – 32S/16D	(Australia) Darren Cahill (Australia) Mark Kratzmann; 6–4, 5–7, 6–0	(Australia) Broderick Dyke (Australia) Simon Youl	(Australia) Todd Woodbridge (Australia) Wally Masur	(Australia) Darren Cahill (West Germany) Eric Jelen (Australia) Jason Stoltenberg (Australia) Shane Barr
2 Oct	Prudential-Bache Securities Classic; Orlando, United States; Super Series; Hard – $297,500 – 32S/16D; Singles – Doubles	(United States) Andre Agassi; 6–2, 6–1	(United States) Brad Gilbert	(United States) Jimmy Brown (Peru) Jaime Yzaga	(United States) Jimmy Arias (Puerto Rico) Miguel Nido (Spain) Emilio Sánchez (United States) David Wheaton
2 Oct	Prudential-Bache Securities Classic; Orlando, United States; Super Series; Hard – $297,500 – 32S/16D; Singles – Doubles	(United States) Scott Davis (United States) Tim Pawsat; 7–5, 5–7, 6–4	(United States) Ken Flach (United States) Robert Seguso	(United States) Jimmy Brown (Peru) Jaime Yzaga	(United States) Jimmy Arias (Puerto Rico) Miguel Nido (Spain) Emilio Sánchez (United States) David Wheaton
2 Oct	Swiss Indoors; Basel, Switzerland; Hard (i) – $361,000 – 32S/16D; Singles – Doubles	(United States) Jim Courier; 7–6^{(8–6)}, 3–6, 2–6, 6–0, 7–5	(Sweden) Stefan Edberg	(United States) Jimmy Connors (Ecuador) Andrés Gómez	(France) Olivier Delaître (Italy) Omar Camporese (Uruguay) Marcelo Filippini (Socialist Federal Republic of Yugoslavia) Goran Ivanišević
2 Oct	Swiss Indoors; Basel, Switzerland; Hard (i) – $361,000 – 32S/16D; Singles – Doubles	(West Germany) Udo Riglewski (West Germany) Michael Stich; 6–3, 4–6, 6–0	(Italy) Omar Camporese (Switzerland) Claudio Mezzadri	(United States) Jimmy Connors (Ecuador) Andrés Gómez	(France) Olivier Delaître (Italy) Omar Camporese (Uruguay) Marcelo Filippini (Socialist Federal Republic of Yugoslavia) Goran Ivanišević
9 Oct	Grand Prix de Tennis de Toulouse; Toulouse, France; Hard (i) – $225,000 – 32S/16D; Singles – Doubles	(United States) Jimmy Connors; 6–3, 6–3	(United States) John McEnroe	(Austria) Horst Skoff (Soviet Union) Andrei Chesnokov	(Sweden) Magnus Gustafsson (Canada) Martin Laurendeau (Sweden) Christian Bergström (France) Jérôme Potier
9 Oct	Grand Prix de Tennis de Toulouse; Toulouse, France; Hard (i) – $225,000 – 32S/16D; Singles – Doubles	(Iran) Mansour Bahrami (France) Éric Winogradsky; 6–2, 7–6	(United States) Todd Nelson (The Bahamas) Roger Smith	(Austria) Horst Skoff (Soviet Union) Andrei Chesnokov	(Sweden) Magnus Gustafsson (Canada) Martin Laurendeau (Sweden) Christian Bergström (France) Jérôme Potier
9 Oct	Australian Indoor Championships; Sydney, Australia; Super Series; Hard (i) – $375,000 – 32S/16D; Singles – Doubles	(Czechoslovakia) Ivan Lendl; 6–2, 6–2, 6–1	(Sweden) Lars-Anders Wahlgren	(Sweden) Niclas Kroon (Australia) Johan Anderson	(Sweden) Thomas Högstedt (Australia) Mark Woodforde (Socialist Federal Republic of Yugoslavia) Slobodan Živojinović (Australia) Jason Stoltenberg
9 Oct	Australian Indoor Championships; Sydney, Australia; Super Series; Hard (i) – $375,000 – 32S/16D; Singles – Doubles	(United States) David Pate (United States) Scott Warner; 6–3, 6–7, 7–5	(Australia) Darren Cahill (Australia) Mark Kratzmann	(Sweden) Niclas Kroon (Australia) Johan Anderson	(Sweden) Thomas Högstedt (Australia) Mark Woodforde (Socialist Federal Republic of Yugoslavia) Slobodan Živojinović (Australia) Jason Stoltenberg
16 Oct	Tel Aviv Open; Tel Aviv, Israel; Hard – $100,000 – 32S/16D; Singles – Doubles	(United States) Jimmy Connors; 2–6, 6–2, 6–1	(Israel) Gilad Bloom	(Italy) Gianluca Pozzi (Israel) Amos Mansdorf	(United States) Kelly Jones (Czechoslovakia) Josef Čihák (West Germany) Markus Zoecke (Puerto Rico) Miguel Nido
16 Oct	Tel Aviv Open; Tel Aviv, Israel; Hard – $100,000 – 32S/16D; Singles – Doubles	(United Kingdom) Jeremy Bates (West Germany) Patrick Baur; 6–1, 4–6, 6–1	(Sweden) Rikard Bergh (Sweden) Per Henricsson	(Italy) Gianluca Pozzi (Israel) Amos Mansdorf	(United States) Kelly Jones (Czechoslovakia) Josef Čihák (West Germany) Markus Zoecke (Puerto Rico) Miguel Nido
16 Oct	CA-TennisTrophy; Vienna, Austria; Carpet (i) – $225,000 – 32S/16D; Singles – Doubles	(United States) Paul Annacone; 6–7^{(5–7)}, 6–4, 6–1, 2–6, 6–3	(New Zealand) Kelly Evernden	(Czechoslovakia) Petr Korda (Austria) Thomas Muster	(United States) Jay Berger (United States) Glenn Layendecker (Soviet Union) Alexander Volkov (Sweden) Anders Järryd
16 Oct	CA-TennisTrophy; Vienna, Austria; Carpet (i) – $225,000 – 32S/16D; Singles – Doubles	(Sweden) Jan Gunnarsson (Sweden) Anders Järryd; 6–1, 4–6, 6–1	(United States) Paul Annacone (New Zealand) Kelly Evernden	(Czechoslovakia) Petr Korda (Austria) Thomas Muster	(United States) Jay Berger (United States) Glenn Layendecker (Soviet Union) Alexander Volkov (Sweden) Anders Järryd
16 Oct	Tokyo Indoor; Tokyo, Japan; Super Series; Carpet (i) – $500,000 – 32S/16D; Singles – Doubles	(United States) Aaron Krickstein; 6–2, 6–2	(West Germany) Carl-Uwe Steeb	(Sweden) Stefan Edberg (Australia) Darren Cahill	(France) Henri Leconte (Canada) Grant Connell (United States) Rick Leach (Haiti) Ronald Agénor
16 Oct	Tokyo Indoor; Tokyo, Japan; Super Series; Carpet (i) – $500,000 – 32S/16D; Singles – Doubles	(United States) Kevin Curren (United States) David Pate; 4–6, 6–3, 7–6	(Ecuador) Andrés Gómez (Socialist Federal Republic of Yugoslavia) Slobodan Živojinović	(Sweden) Stefan Edberg (Australia) Darren Cahill	(France) Henri Leconte (Canada) Grant Connell (United States) Rick Leach (Haiti) Ronald Agénor
23 Oct	Frankfurt Cup; Frankfurt, West Germany; Carpet (i) – $175,000 – 32S/16D	(United States) Kevin Curren; 6–2, 7–5	(Czechoslovakia) Petr Korda	(Netherlands) Tom Nijssen (United States) Richard Matuszewski	(West Germany) Eric Jelen (West Germany) Michael Stich (United States) Glenn Layendecker (West Germany) Jens Wöhrmann
23 Oct	Frankfurt Cup; Frankfurt, West Germany; Carpet (i) – $175,000 – 32S/16D	(South Africa) Pieter Aldrich (South Africa) Danie Visser; 7–6, 6–7, 6–3	(United States) Kevin Curren (West Germany) Eric Jelen	(Netherlands) Tom Nijssen (United States) Richard Matuszewski	(West Germany) Eric Jelen (West Germany) Michael Stich (United States) Glenn Layendecker (West Germany) Jens Wöhrmann
30 Oct	Paris Open; Paris, France; Super Series; Carpet (i) – $1,000,000 – 32S/16D; Singles – Doubles	(West Germany) Boris Becker; 6–4, 6–3, 6–3	(Sweden) Stefan Edberg	(United States) John McEnroe (United States) Aaron Krickstein	(Australia) Wally Masur (United States) Michael Chang (United States) Brad Gilbert (Switzerland) Jakob Hlasek
30 Oct	Paris Open; Paris, France; Super Series; Carpet (i) – $1,000,000 – 32S/16D; Singles – Doubles	(Australia) John Fitzgerald (Sweden) Anders Järryd; 7–6, 6–4	(Switzerland) Jakob Hlasek (France) Éric Winogradsky	(United States) John McEnroe (United States) Aaron Krickstein	(Australia) Wally Masur (United States) Michael Chang (United States) Brad Gilbert (Switzerland) Jakob Hlasek

=== November ===
Week	Tournament	Champions	Runners-up	Semifinalists	Quarterfinalists
6 Nov	Philips Open; São Paulo, Brazil; Carpet – $100,000 – 32S	(Argentina) Martín Jaite; 7–6^{(7–5)}, 6–3	(Spain) Javier Sánchez	(France) Jean-Philippe Fleurian (Netherlands) Mark Koevermans	(United States) Jay Berger (Uruguay) Marcelo Filippini (Spain) Francisco Roig (Brazil) Luiz Mattar
6 Nov	Philips Open; São Paulo, Brazil; Carpet – $100,000 – 32S	Doubles final not played due to rain		(France) Jean-Philippe Fleurian (Netherlands) Mark Koevermans	(United States) Jay Berger (Uruguay) Marcelo Filippini (Spain) Francisco Roig (Brazil) Luiz Mattar
6 Nov	Stockholm Open; Stockholm, Sweden; Super Series; Carpet (i) – $832,500 – 48S/24D; Singles – Doubles	(Czechoslovakia) Ivan Lendl; 7–5, 6–0, 6–3	(Sweden) Magnus Gustafsson	(Sweden) Stefan Edberg (Sweden) Mats Wilander	(United States) Tim Mayotte (United States) Jim Courier (United States) Andre Agassi (Sweden) Jan Gunnarsson
6 Nov	Stockholm Open; Stockholm, Sweden; Super Series; Carpet (i) – $832,500 – 48S/24D; Singles – Doubles	(Mexico) Jorge Lozano (United States) Todd Witsken; 6–0, 5–7, 6–3	(United States) Rick Leach (United States) Jim Pugh	(Sweden) Stefan Edberg (Sweden) Mats Wilander	(United States) Tim Mayotte (United States) Jim Courier (United States) Andre Agassi (Sweden) Jan Gunnarsson
6 Nov	Benson & Hedges Championships; London, Great Britain; Super Series; Carpet (i) – $400,000 – 32S/16D; Singles – Doubles	(United States) Michael Chang; 6–2, 6–1, 6–1	(France) Guy Forget	(United States) John McEnroe (Australia) Wally Masur	(Czechoslovakia) Miloslav Mečíř (United States) Robert Seguso (United States) Brad Gilbert (Soviet Union) Andrei Chesnokov
6 Nov	Benson & Hedges Championships; London, Great Britain; Super Series; Carpet (i) – $400,000 – 32S/16D; Singles – Doubles	(Switzerland) Jakob Hlasek (United States) John McEnroe; 6–1, 7–6	(United Kingdom) Jeremy Bates (United States) Kevin Curren	(United States) John McEnroe (Australia) Wally Masur	(Czechoslovakia) Miloslav Mečíř (United States) Robert Seguso (United States) Brad Gilbert (Soviet Union) Andrei Chesnokov
13 Nov	South African Open; Johannesburg, South Africa; Super Series; Hard (i) – $297,500 – 32S/16D; Singles – Doubles	(South Africa) Christo van Rensburg; 6–4, 7–6, 6–3	(United States) Paul Chamberlin	(United States) Joey Rive (United Kingdom) Jeremy Bates	(South Africa) Michael Robertson (South Africa) Gary Muller (United States) David Pate (South Africa) Dean Botha
13 Nov	South African Open; Johannesburg, South Africa; Super Series; Hard (i) – $297,500 – 32S/16D; Singles – Doubles	(United States) Luke Jensen (United States) Richey Reneberg; 6–0, 6–4	(United States) Kelly Jones (United States) Joey Rive	(United States) Joey Rive (United Kingdom) Jeremy Bates	(South Africa) Michael Robertson (South Africa) Gary Muller (United States) David Pate (South Africa) Dean Botha
20 Nov	Citibank Open; Itaparica, Brazil; Hard – $275,000 – 32S/16D	(Argentina) Martín Jaite; 6–4, 6–4	(United States) Jay Berger	(Spain) Emilio Sánchez (Peru) Jaime Yzaga	(Brazil) Luiz Mattar (Netherlands) Paul Haarhuis (Uruguay) Marcelo Filippini (Netherlands) Mark Koevermans
20 Nov	Citibank Open; Itaparica, Brazil; Hard – $275,000 – 32S/16D	(United States) Rick Leach (United States) Jim Pugh; 6–2, 7–6	(Mexico) Jorge Lozano (United States) Todd Witsken	(Spain) Emilio Sánchez (Peru) Jaime Yzaga	(Brazil) Luiz Mattar (Netherlands) Paul Haarhuis (Uruguay) Marcelo Filippini (Netherlands) Mark Koevermans
27 Nov	1989 Nabisco Masters (singles); New York City, United States; Grand Prix Masters; Carpet (i) – $750,000 – 8S; Singles	(Sweden) Stefan Edberg; 4–6, 7–6^{(8–6)}, 6–3, 6–1	(West Germany) Boris Becker	(Czechoslovakia) Ivan Lendl (United States) John McEnroe	Round robin: (United States) Aaron Krickstein (United States) Michael Chang (United States) Brad Gilbert (United States) Andre Agassi

=== December ===
Week	Tournament	Champions	Runners-up	Semifinalists	Quarterfinalists
4 Dec	1989 Nabisco Masters (doubles); London, Great Britain; Grand Prix Masters; Carpet (i) – $200,000 – 8D; Doubles	(United States) Jim Grabb (United States) Patrick McEnroe; 7–5, 7–5, 5–7, 6–3	(Australia) John Fitzgerald (Sweden) Anders Järryd	(South Africa) Pieter Aldrich / (South Africa) Danie Visser (Australia) Darren Cahill / (Australia) Mark Kratzmann	
11 Dec	Davis Cup: Final; Stuttgart, West Germany – carpet (i)	West Germany; 3–2	Sweden		

== Points system ==
The tournaments of the 1989 Grand Prix circuit were divided into forty point categories. The highest points were allocated to the Grand Slam tournaments; French Open, the Wimbledon Championships, the US Open and the Australian Open. The singles points allocation is as follows:

	Grand Slam	2 week tournament	$1,000,000+	$975,000+	$950,000+	$925,000+	$900,000+	$875,000+	$850,000+	$825,000+	$800,000+	$775,000+	$750,000+	$725,000+	Buick-WCT	$700,000+	$675,000+	$650,000+	$625,000+	$600,000+	$575,000+	$550,000+	$525,000+	$500,000+	$475,000+	$450,000+	$425,000+	$400,000+	$375,000+	$350,000+	$325,000+	$300,000+	$275,000+	$250,000+	$225,000+	$200,000+	$175,000+	$150,000+	$125,000+	$100,000+
Category	1	2	3	4	5	6	7	8	9	10	11	12	13	14	15	16	17	18	19	20	21	22	23	24	25	26	27	28	29	30	31	32	33	34	35	36	37	38	39	40
Winner	1200	1000	1000	975	950	925	900	875	850	825	800	775	750	725	700	700	675	650	625	600	575	550	525	500	475	450	425	400	375	350	325	300	275	250	225	200	175	150	125	100
Runner-up	840	700	700	683	665	648	630	613	593	578	560	543	525	508	500	490	473	455	438	420	403	385	368	350	333	315	298	280	263	245	228	210	193	175	158	140	123	105	88	70
Semifinalist	480	400	400	390	380	370	360	350	340	330	320	310	300	290	300	280	270	260	250	240	230	220	210	200	190	180	170	160	150	140	130	120	110	100	90	80	70	60	50	40
Quarterfinalist	240	200	200	195	190	185	180	175	170	165	160	155	150	145	150	140	135	130	125	120	115	110	105	100	95	90	85	80	75	70	65	60	55	50	45	40	35	30	25	20
Last 16	120	100	100	98	95	93	90	88	85	83	80	78	75	73	-	70	68	65	63	60	58	55	53	50	48	45	43	40	38	35	33	30	28	25	23	20	18	15	13	10
Last 32	60	50	50	49	48	46	45	44	43	41	40	39	38	36	--	35	34	33	31	30	29	28	26	25	24	23	21	20	19	18	16	15	14	13	11	10	9	8	6	5
Last 64	30	25																																						

== Top tournaments ranked by Grand Prix points & prize money ==
Tournament	Prize money	Category
The four Grand Slam tournaments		1
Lipton Championships, Key Biscayne (2 week tournament)	$745,000	2
Paris Open	$1,000,000	3
Stockholm Open	$832,500	10
Italian Open	$807,500	11
Nabisco Masters	$750,000	
WCT Finals	$500,000	15
Stratton Mountain	$602,500	20
Canadian Open	$550,000	22
Indian Wells	$510,000	24
German Open	$500,000	24
Tokyo Indoor	$500,000	24
Cincinnati Open	$485,000	25
Forest Hills Tournament of Champions	$485,000	25

== Rankings ==
=== Grand Prix ===
Year-end rankings 1988
Rk	Name	Nation
1	Mats Wilander	SWE
2	Ivan Lendl	TCH
3	Andre Agassi	USA
4	Boris Becker	FRG
5	Stefan Edberg	SWE
6	Kent Carlsson	SWE
7	Jimmy Connors	USA
8	Jakob Hlasek	SUI
9	Henri Leconte	FRA
10	Tim Mayotte	USA
11	John McEnroe	USA
12	Yannick Noah	FRA
13	Miloslav Mečíř	TCH
14	Aaron Krickstein	USA
15	Thomas Muster	AUT
16	Emilio Sánchez	ESP
17	Guillermo Pérez Roldán	ARG
18	Mikael Pernfors	SWE
19	Pat Cash	AUS
20	Jonas Svensson	SWE

Year-end rankings 1989
Rk	Name	Nation	Points	Bonus
1	Ivan Lendl	TCH	9,231	$800,000
2	Boris Becker	FRG	6,239	$550,000
3	Stefan Edberg	SWE	5,505	$400,000
4	Brad Gilbert	USA	4,396	$250,000
5	John McEnroe	USA	3,917	$150,000
6	Michael Chang	USA	3,441	$100,000
7	Andre Agassi	USA	3,289	$75,000
8	Aaron Krickstein	USA	3,124	$55,000
9	Alberto Mancini	ARG	2,615	$45,000
10	Jay Berger	USA	2,325	$40,000
11	Mats Wilander	SWE	2,127	$35,000
12	Tim Mayotte	USA	2,066	$30,000
13	Martín Jaite	ARG	2,026	$26,000
14	Miloslav Mečíř	TCH	1,923	$26,000
15	Horst Skoff	AUT	1,810	$26,000
16	Carl-Uwe Steeb	FRG	1,759	$26,000
17	Andrés Gómez	ECU	1,672	$26,000
18	Emilio Sánchez	ESP	1,603	$22,000
19	Kevin Curren	USA	1,551	$22,000
20	Yannick Noah	FRA	1,550	$22,000

=== ATP ===
As of 9 January 1989
Rk	Name	Nation
1	Mats Wilander	SWE
2	Ivan Lendl	TCH
3	Andre Agassi	USA
4	Boris Becker	FRG
5	Stefan Edberg	SWE
6	Kent Carlsson	SWE
7	Jimmy Connors	USA
8	Jakob Hlasek	SUI
9	Henri Leconte	FRA
10	Tim Mayotte	USA
11	John McEnroe	USA
12	Yannick Noah	FRA
13	Miloslav Mečíř	TCH
14	Aaron Krickstein	USA
15	Thomas Muster	AUT
16	Emilio Sánchez	ESP
17	Guillermo Pérez Roldán	ARG
18	Mikael Pernfors	SWE
19	Pat Cash	AUS
20	Jonas Svensson	SWE

Year-end rankings 1989 (18 December 1989)
Rk	Name	Nation	Points	High	Low	Change
1	Ivan Lendl	TCH	213.21	1	2	▲ +1
2	Boris Becker	FRG	189.92	2	5	▲ +2
3	Stefan Edberg	SWE	150.86	3	5	▲ +2
4	John McEnroe	USA	112.83	4	11	▲ +7
5	Michael Chang	USA	89.07	5	30	▲ +25
6	Brad Gilbert	USA	85.82	5	22	▲ +16
7	Andre Agassi	USA	82.86	3	7	▼ −4
8	Aaron Krickstein	USA	70.17	8	18	▲ +6
9	Alberto Mancini	ARG	60.47	8	49	▲ +40
10	Jay Berger	USA	58.78	10	42	▲ +24
11	Martín Jaite	ARG	56.65	11	79	▲ +42
12	Mats Wilander	SWE	55.71	1	16	▼ −11
13	Tim Mayotte	USA	54.56	8	13	▼ −3
14	Jimmy Connors	USA	52.43	7	19	▼ −7
15	Carl-Uwe Steeb	FRG	49.33	15	96	▲ +54
16	Yannick Noah	FRA	46.21	12	25	▼ −4
17	Andrés Gómez	ECU	43.94	17	40	▲ +7
18	Miloslav Mečíř	TCH	43.86	8	28	▼ −5
19	Emilio Sánchez	ESP	42.29	13	24	▼ −3
20	Kevin Curren	USA	42.00	14	27	▲ +3

== List of tournament winners ==
List of players and Grand Prix singles titles won, alphabetically by last name:

- (United States) Andre Agassi – Orlando (1)
- (Haiti) Ronald Agénor – Athens (1)
- (Spain) Juan Aguilera – Bari (1)
- (Spain) José Francisco Altur – San Marino (1)
- (United States) Paul Annacone – Vienna (1)
- (West Germany) Boris Becker – Milan, Philadelphia, Wimbledon, US Open, Paris Bercy (5)
- (United States) Jay Berger – Charleston (1)
- (Italy) Paolo Canè – Båstad (1)
- (United States) Michael Chang – French Open, Wembley (2)
- (Soviet Union) Andrei Chesnokov – Nice, Munich (2)
- (United States) Jimmy Connors – Toulouse, Tel Aviv (2)
- (United States) Jim Courier – Basel (1)
- (United States) Kevin Curren – Frankfurt (1)
- (Argentina) Franco Davín – St. Vincent (1)
- (Argentina) Horacio de la Peña – Florence (1)
- (Sweden) Stefan Edberg – Tokyo, Season-Ending Championships (2)
- (Australia) Kelly Evernden – Wellington (1)
- (Uruguay) Marcelo Filippini – Prague (1)
- (France) Guy Forget – Nancy (1)
- (United States) Brad Gilbert – Memphis, Stratton Mountain, Livingston, Cincinnati, San Francisco (5)
- (Ecuador) Andrés Gómez – Boston, Barcelona (2)
- (Switzerland) Jakob Hlasek – Rotterdam (1)
- (Argentina) Martín Jaite – Stuttgart, Madrid, São Paulo, Itaparica (4)
- (West Germany) Eric Jelen – Bristol (1)
- (United States) Kelly Jones – Singapore City (1)
- (United States) Aaron Krickstein – Sydney, Los Angeles, Tokyo Indoors (3)
- (India) Ramesh Krishnan – Auckland (1)
- (Sweden) Niclas Kroon – Brisbane (1)
- (Czechoslovakia) Ivan Lendl – Australian Open, Scottsdale, Miami, Forest Hills, Hamburg, London, Canada, Bordeaux, Sydney Indoors, Stockholm (10)
- (Argentina) Alberto Mancini – Monte Carlo, Rome (2)
- (Brazil) Luiz Mattar – Guarujá, Rio de Janeiro (2)
- (United States) Tim Mayotte – Washington, D.C. (1)
- (United States) John McEnroe – Lyon, Dallas, Indianapolis (3)
- (Czechoslovakia) Miloslav Mečíř – Indian Wells (1)
- (Czechoslovakia) Karel Nováček – Hilversum (1)
- (Argentina) Guillermo Pérez Roldán – Palermo (1)
- (United States) Jim Pugh – Newport (1)
- (Switzerland) Marc Rosset – Geneva (1)
- (Spain) Emilio Sánchez – Kitzbühel (1)
- (Spain) Javier Sánchez – Bologna (1)
- (West Germany) Carl-Uwe Steeb – Gstaad (1)
- (United States) Robert Van't Hof – Seoul (1)
- (South Africa) Christo van Rensburg – Johannesburg (1)
- (Australia) Mark Woodforde – Adelaide (1)
- (Australia) Simon Youl – Schenectady (1)

The following players won their first career title:

- (Haiti) Ronald Agénor
- (Spain) José Francisco Altur
- (United States) Jim Courier
- (Argentina) Franco Davín
- (West Germany) Eric Jelen
- (United States) Kelly Jones
- (Sweden) Niclas Kroon
- (United States) Jim Pugh
- (Switzerland) Marc Rosset
- (West Germany) Carl-Uwe Steeb
- (Australia) Simon Youl

== See also ==
- 1989 WTA Tour
- 1989 ATP Challenger Series
- World Championship Tennis
