= 1989 Cincinnati Open – Doubles =

Doubles
- 1989 Cincinnati Open

Final
- Champions: (United States) Ken Flach (United States) Robert Seguso
- Runners-up: (South Africa) Pieter Aldrich (South Africa) Danie Visser
- Score: 6–4, 6–4

Events
Singles	Doubles
← 1988 ·	Cincinnati Open	· 1990 →

Rick Leach and Jim Pugh were the defending champions but only Leach competed that year with Laurie Warder.

Leach and Warder lost in the quarterfinals to Pieter Aldrich and Danie Visser.

Ken Flach and Robert Seguso won in the final 6–4, 6–4 against Aldrich and Visser.

== Seeds ==
1. (Australia) John Fitzgerald / (Sweden) Anders Järryd (quarterfinals)
2. (United States) Jim Grabb / (United States) Patrick McEnroe (quarterfinals)
3. (United States) Ken Flach / (United States) Robert Seguso (champions)
4. (United States) Rick Leach / (Australia) Laurie Warder (quarterfinals)
5. (Australia) Mark Kratzmann / (Australia) Wally Masur (second round)
6. (South Africa) Pieter Aldrich / (South Africa) Danie Visser (final)
7. (United States) Jim Courier / (United States) Pete Sampras (semifinals)
8. (Peru) Carlos di Laura / (Argentina) Javier Frana (semifinals)

== Draw ==
=== Key ===
- Q = Qualifier
- WC = Wild card
- LL = Lucky loser
- Alt = Alternate
- SE = Special exempt
- PR = Protected ranking
- ITF = ITF entry
- JE = Junior exempt
- w/o = Walkover
- r = Retired
- d = Defaulted
- SR = Special ranking

=== Final ===
Semifinals
8	(Peru) Carlos di Laura (Argentina) Javier Frana	6	2
3	(United States) Ken Flach (United States) Robert Seguso	7	6
6	(South Africa) Pieter Aldrich (South Africa) Danie Visser	7	6
7	(United States) Jim Courier (United States) Pete Sampras	6	3

Final
3	(United States) Ken Flach (United States) Robert Seguso	6	6
6	(South Africa) Pieter Aldrich (South Africa) Danie Visser	4	4

=== Top half ===
First round
1	(Australia) J Fitzgerald (Sweden) A Järryd	6	6
(Soviet Union) A Olhovskiy (Soviet Union) A Volkov	3	3
(Soviet Union) A Cherkasov (Soviet Union) A Chesnokov	7	4	4
(United States) R Phillips (United States) S Salumaa	6	6	6
(Australia) C Eagle (South Africa) B Moir	4	3
(Ecuador) A Gómez (Sweden) M Wilander	6	6
(United States) R Baxter (United States) L Scott	5	5
8	(Peru) C di Laura (Argentina) J Frana	7	7
3	(United States) K Flach (United States) R Seguso	5	6	6
(Mexico) A Moreno (Peru) J Yzaga	7	4	4
(United States) M De Palmer (United States) G Van Emburgh	3	3
(United States) M Anger (United States) R Van't Hof	6	6
(The Bahamas) M Knowles (Venezuela) M Ruah	3	2
(United Kingdom) N Broad (South Africa) G Muller	6	6
(United States) R Matuszewski (Netherlands) M Schapers	2	2
5	(Australia) M Kratzmann (Australia) W Masur	6	6

Second round
1	(Australia) J Fitzgerald (Sweden) A Järryd	6	6
(United States) R Phillips (United States) S Salumaa	2	1
(Ecuador) A Gómez (Sweden) M Wilander	6	3	0
8	(Peru) C di Laura (Argentina) J Frana	1	6	6
3	(United States) K Flach (United States) R Seguso	4	7	6
(United States) M Anger (United States) R Van't Hof	6	6	1
(United Kingdom) N Broad (South Africa) G Muller	7	6
5	(Australia) M Kratzmann (Australia) W Masur	6	3

Quarterfinals
1	(Australia) J Fitzgerald (Sweden) A Järryd	6	2	3
8	(Peru) C di Laura (Argentina) J Frana	3	6	6
3	(United States) K Flach (United States) R Seguso	1
(United Kingdom) N Broad (South Africa) G Muller	2^{r}

Semifinals
8	(Peru) C di Laura (Argentina) J Frana	6	2
3	(United States) K Flach (United States) R Seguso	7	6

=== Bottom half ===
First round
6	(South Africa) P Aldrich (South Africa) D Visser	6	6	6
(United Kingdom) C Bailey (United States) B Scanlon	3	7	3
(Puerto Rico) M Nido (United States) M Robertson	7	6
(United States) J Rive (United States) T Wilkison	6	3
(India) V Amritraj (Sweden) P Lundgren	7	6
(France) O Delaître (France) T Tulasne	6	0
(United States) M Flur (United States) T Siegel	1	2
4	(United States) R Leach (Australia) L Warder	6	6
7	(United States) J Courier (United States) P Sampras	6	4	6
(United States) M Davis (United States) T Pawsat	4	6	1
(Sweden) N Kroon (France) E Winogradsky	6	6
(United States) E Ross (United States) J Ross	4	3
(United States) B Pearce (South Africa) B Talbot	6	4	6
(South Africa) C Honey (India) R Krishnan	2	6	1
(South Africa) S Kruger (Australia) J Stoltenberg	4	1
2	(United States) J Grabb (United States) P McEnroe	6	6

Second round
6	(South Africa) P Aldrich (South Africa) D Visser	6	7
(Puerto Rico) M Nido (United States) M Robertson	2	6
(India) V Amritraj (Sweden) P Lundgren	2	3
4	(United States) R Leach (Australia) L Warder	6	6
7	(United States) J Courier (United States) P Sampras	6	6
(Sweden) N Kroon (France) E Winogradsky	3	3
(United States) B Pearce (South Africa) B Talbot	1	4
2	(United States) J Grabb (United States) P McEnroe	6	6

Quarterfinals
6	(South Africa) P Aldrich (South Africa) D Visser	4	6	7
4	(United States) R Leach (Australia) L Warder	6	2	6
7	(United States) J Courier (United States) P Sampras	4	6	6
2	(United States) J Grabb (United States) P McEnroe	6	4	3

Semifinals
6	(South Africa) P Aldrich (South Africa) D Visser	7	6
7	(United States) J Courier (United States) P Sampras	6	3
