= 1989 Volvo International – Singles =

Singles
- 1989 Volvo International

Final
- Champion: (United States) Brad Gilbert
- Runner-up: (United States) Jim Pugh
- Score: 7–5, 6–0

Details
- Draw: 64
- Seeds: 16

Events
Singles	Doubles
← 1988 ·	Volvo International	· 1990 →

Andre Agassi was the defending champion but lost in the third round to David Wheaton.

Brad Gilbert won in the final 7–5, 6–0 against Jim Pugh.

== Seeds ==
A champion seed is indicated in bold text while text in italics indicates the round in which that seed was eliminated.

1. (United States) Andre Agassi (third round)
2. (United States) Michael Chang (quarterfinals)
3. (United States) **Brad Gilbert (champion)**
4. (United States) Kevin Curren (second round)
5. (Israel) Amos Mansdorf (second round)
6. (United States) Jay Berger (second round)
7. (France) Yannick Noah (second round)
8. (United States) Dan Goldie (third round)
9. (United States) Jim Courier (quarterfinals)
10. (United States) Johan Kriek (third round)
11. (United States) Paul Annacone (second round)
12. (United States) Robert Seguso (quarterfinals)
13. (United States) Paul Chamberlin (first round)
14. (United States) Jim Pugh (final)
15. (United States) Derrick Rostagno (third round)
16. (United States) Scott Davis (second round)

== Draw ==
=== Key ===
- Q = Qualifier
- WC = Wild card
- LL = Lucky loser
- Alt = Alternate
- SE = Special exempt
- PR = Protected ranking
- ITF = ITF entry
- JE = Junior exempt
- w/o = Walkover
- r = Retired
- d = Defaulted
- SR = Special ranking

=== Finals ===
Semifinals
(United States) David Wheaton	**7**	6	4
3	(United States) **Brad Gilbert**	5	**7**	**6**
14	(United States) **Jim Pugh**	**6**	**6**
(United States) Jim Grabb	4	2

Final
3	(United States) **Brad Gilbert**	**7**	**6**
14	(United States) Jim Pugh	5	0

=== Top half ===
==== Section 1 ====
First round
1	(United States) **A Agassi**	**6**	**6**
(Canada) G Michibata	2	2
(United States) **M Davis**	**7**	**6**
(South Africa) D Visser	6	2
(United States) **D Wheaton**	**6**	**6**
(Canada) M Laurendeau	4	2
WC	(United States) D Leaycraft	1	0
16	(United States) **J Kriek**	**6**	**6**
9	(United States) **J Courier**	**6**	**7**
(United States) J Brown	3	5
(Argentina) J Frana	4	**6**	3
(United States) **S Giammalva, Jr.**	**6**	3	**6**
Q	(United States) **K Flach**	**6**	**6**
(France) P Pech	4	3
WC	(United States) P McEnroe	1	4
8	(United States) **D Goldie**	**6**	**6**

Second round
1	(United States) **A Agassi**	**6**	3	**6**
(United States) M Davis	1	**6**	3
(United States) **D Wheaton**	**6**	**6**
16	(United States) S Davis	1	4
9	(United States) **J Courier**	**6**	**6**
(United States) S Giammalva, Jr.	2	2
Q	(United States) K Flach	**7**	1	6
8	(United States) **D Goldie**	6	**6**	**7**

Third round
1	(United States) A Agassi	**6**	6	1
(United States) **D Wheaton**	1	**7**	**6**
9	(United States) **J Courier**	**6**	**6**
8	(United States) D Goldie	2	3

Quarterfinals
(United States) **D Wheaton**	**6**	**6**
9	(United States) J Courier	4	2

==== Section 2 ====
First round
3	(United States) **B Gilbert**	**6**	**6**
Q	(United States) R Schmidt	2	2
(United States) D Cassidy	**6**	3	2
(Italy) **G Pozzi**	3	**6**	**6**
(South Africa) **P Aldrich**	**6**	2	**6**
(United States) D Pate	3	**6**	2
(Australia) **W Masur**	1	**7**	**6**
13	(United States) P Chamberlin	**6**	6	3
11	(United States) **P Annacone**	**7**	**6**
(Venezuela) N Pereira	5	2
(United States) **G Layendecker**	6	**7**	**6**
(South Africa) G Muller	**7**	6	3
(Canada) **G Connell**	**6**	**7**
(Netherlands) M Schapers	1	6
Q	(United States) M Barba	4	1
5	(Israel) **A Mansdorf**	**6**	**6**

Second round
3	(United States) **B Gilbert**	**6**	**6**
(Italy) G Pozzi	1	2
(South Africa) P Aldrich	**6**	3	4
(Australia) **W Masur**	3	**6**	**6**
11	(United States) P Annacone	4	6
(United States) **G Layendecker**	**6**	**7**
(Canada) **G Connell**	**6**	**7**
5	(Israel) A Mansdorf	3	6

Third round
3	(United States) **B Gilbert**	**6**	**7**
(Australia) W Masur	4	6
(United States) **G Layendecker**	**7**	**6**
(Canada) G Connell	5	2

Quarterfinals
3	(United States) **B Gilbert**	**6**	**7**
(United States) G Layendecker	4	5

=== Bottom half ===
==== Section 3 ====
First round
6	(United States) **J Berger**	**6**	6	**6**
(United States) J Tarango	3	**7**	2
(Canada) **A Sznajder**	**6**	6	**6**
(Australia) C Limberger	4	**7**	2
(United States) **T Wilkison**	**7**	**6**
(Australia) S Youl	5	1
(Australia) M Kratzmann	3	**6**	3
12	(United States) **R Seguso**	**6**	3	**6**
14	(United States) **J Pugh**	**6**	3	**7**
WC	(United States) A Parker	2	**6**	5
(Canada) **C Pridham**	**7**	5	**6**
(Australia) J Frawley	5	**7**	3
WC	(United States) **J Palmer**	**7**	**6**
Q	(United States) S Warner	6	3
Q	(United States) D Goldberg	6	1
4	(United States) **K Curren**	**7**	**6**

Second round
6	(United States) J Berger	2	**6**	3
(Canada) **A Sznajder**	**6**	2	**6**
(United States) T Wilkison	3	2
12	(United States) **R Seguso**	**6**	**6**
14	(United States) **J Pugh**	3	**7**	**7**
(Canada) C Pridham	**6**	5	6
WC	(United States) **J Palmer**	**6**	**6**
4	(United States) K Curren	4	3

Third round
(Canada) A Sznajder	3	**6**	2
12	(United States) **R Seguso**	**6**	3	**6**
14	(United States) **J Pugh**	3	**7**	**6**
WC	(United States) J Palmer	**6**	6	3

Quarterfinals
12	(United States) R Seguso	3	2
14	(United States) **J Pugh**	**6**	**6**

==== Section 4 ====
First round
WC/7	(France) **Y Noah**	4	**7**	**6**
(United Kingdom) J Bates	**6**	6	2
(Senegal) Y Doumbia	3	4
(United States) **J Grabb**	**6**	**6**
Q	(South Africa) T Reynders	3	0
Q	(United States) **S Bryan**	**6**	**6**
(Australia) R Fromberg	6	1
10	(United States) **J Kriek**	**7**	**6**
15	(United States) **D Rostagno**	0	**6**	**7**
(Portugal) N Marques	**6**	3	6
Q	(United States) **T Donovan**	**7**	**6**
(United Kingdom) N Broad	6	4
(Sweden) **J Carlsson**	**6**	**6**
(Sweden) T Högstedt	1	0
(United States) P Sampras	4	4
2	(United States) **M Chang**	**6**	**6**

Second round
WC/7	(France) Y Noah	1	4
(United States) **J Grabb**	**6**	**6**
Q	(United States) S Bryan	**6**	4	6
10	(United States) **J Kriek**	1	**6**	**7**
15	(United States) **D Rostagno**	**7**	**7**
Q	(United States) T Donovan	6	5
(Sweden) J Carlsson	5	3
2	(United States) **M Chang**	**7**	**6**

Third round
(United States) **J Grabb**	**6**	**6**
10	(United States) J Kriek	3	4
15	(United States) D Rostagno	3	2
2	(United States) **M Chang**	**6**	**6**

Quarterfinals
(United States) **J Grabb**	**6**	**6**
2	(United States) M Chang	2	4
