= 1989 Cincinnati Open – Singles =

Singles
- 1989 Cincinnati Open

Final
- Champion: (United States) Brad Gilbert
- Runner-up: (Sweden) Stefan Edberg
- Score: 6–4, 2–6, 7–6

Details
- Draw: 64
- Seeds: 16

Events
Singles	Doubles
← 1988 ·	Cincinnati Open	· 1990 →

Mats Wilander was the defending champion but lost in the semifinals to Stefan Edberg.

Brad Gilbert won in the final 6–4, 2–6, 7–6 against Edberg.

== Seeds ==
1. (West Germany) Boris Becker (semifinals)
2. (Sweden) Stefan Edberg (final)
3. (Sweden) Mats Wilander (semifinals)
4. (United States) Michael Chang (quarterfinals)
5. (United States) Brad Gilbert (champion)
6. (United States) Aaron Krickstein (third round)
7. (Soviet Union) Andrei Chesnokov (second round)
8. (Peru) Jaime Yzaga (quarterfinals)
9. (Sweden) Anders Järryd (first round)
10. (Sweden) Jonas Svensson (quarterfinals)
11. (Australia) John Fitzgerald (first round)
12. (Ecuador) Andrés Gómez (quarterfinals)
13. (Sweden) Peter Lundgren (first round)
14. (United States) Jim Courier (third round)
15. (Soviet Union) Alexander Volkov (first round)
16. (United States) Derrick Rostagno (first round)

== Draw ==
=== Key ===
- Q = Qualifier
- WC = Wild card
- LL = Lucky loser
- Alt = Alternate
- SE = Special exempt
- PR = Protected ranking
- ITF = ITF entry
- JE = Junior exempt
- w/o = Walkover
- r = Retired
- d = Defaulted
- SR = Special ranking

=== Finals ===
Semifinals
1	(West Germany) Boris Becker	6	3	4
5	(United States) Brad Gilbert	3	6	6
3	(Sweden) Mats Wilander	6	6
2	(Sweden) Stefan Edberg	7	7

Final
5	(United States) Brad Gilbert	6	2	7
2	(Sweden) Stefan Edberg	4	6	6

=== Top half ===
==== Section 1 ====
First round
1	(West Germany) B Becker	6	7
(United States) R Leach	3	6
Q	(United States) P McEnroe	6	6
Q	(The Bahamas) M Knowles	1	0
Q	(Venezuela) M Ruah	2	1
(India) V Amritraj	6	6
(France) O Delaître	7	6
15	(Soviet Union) A Volkov	6	1
9	(Sweden) A Järryd	3	6	3
(United States) M Davis	6	4	6
(Finland) O Rahnasto	1^{r}
(United States) J Brown	4
(United States) R Van't Hof	3	6	2
(South Africa) D Visser	6	3	6
(Portugal) N Marques	3	3
8	(Peru) J Yzaga	6	6

Second round
1	(West Germany) B Becker	6	6
Q	(United States) P McEnroe	4	1
(India) V Amritraj	6	7
(France) O Delaître	3	6
(United States) M Davis	6	2	6
(United States) J Brown	3	6	4
(South Africa) D Visser	4	2
8	(Peru) J Yzaga	6	6

Third round
1	(West Germany) B Becker	6	6
(India) V Amritraj	1	1
(United States) M Davis	4	6	6
8	(Peru) J Yzaga	6	2	7

Quarterfinals
1	(West Germany) B Becker	6	6
8	(Peru) J Yzaga	1	2

==== Section 2 ====
First round
4	(United States) M Chang	6	6
(United Kingdom) N Broad	1	1
(United States) J Grabb	6	6
(Australia) J Frawley	1	3
(Australia) M Kratzmann	1	2
(United States) R Seguso	6	6
(United States) T Wilkison	2	4
14	(United States) J Courier	6	6
11	(Australia) J Fitzgerald	4	4
(United States) P Sampras	6	6
(Puerto Rico) M Nido	6	0	4
(Soviet Union) A Olhovskiy	1	6	6
WC	(United States) J Ross	3	0
(Australia) J Stoltenberg	6	6
Q	(Mexico) A Moreno	3	4
5	(United States) B Gilbert	6	6

Second round
4	(United States) M Chang	6	5	7
(United States) J Grabb	3	7	6
(United States) R Seguso	6	1	4
14	(United States) J Courier	3	6	6
(United States) P Sampras	7	2	6
(Soviet Union) A Olhovskiy	5	6	3
(Australia) J Stoltenberg	3	2
5	(United States) B Gilbert	6	6

Third round
4	(United States) M Chang	6	6
14	(United States) J Courier	3	3
(United States) P Sampras	7	3	4
5	(United States) B Gilbert	6	6	6

Quarterfinals
4	(United States) M Chang	6	6	3
5	(United States) B Gilbert	3	7	6

=== Bottom half ===
==== Section 3 ====
First round
6	(United States) A Krickstein	6	6	6
(Soviet Union) A Cherkasov	7	4	1
(United Kingdom) C Bailey	6	7
LL	(United Kingdom) M Petchey	2	6
(France) T Tulasne	3	1
(United States) D Pate	6	6
(Australia) W Masur	4	4
12	(Ecuador) A Gómez	6	6
13	(Sweden) P Lundgren	5	2
(Sweden) N Kroon	7	6
(South Africa) P Aldrich	6	6
Q	(Venezuela) M Rincon	1	2
(United States) J Rive	4	6	6
(United States) R Matuszewski	6	4	2
Q	(South Africa) B Talbot	3	2
3	(Sweden) M Wilander	6	6

Second round
6	(United States) A Krickstein	6	7
(United Kingdom) C Bailey	3	5
(United States) D Pate	4	3
12	(Ecuador) A Gómez	6	6
(Sweden) N Kroon	6	6
(South Africa) P Aldrich	3	3
(United States) J Rive	4	4
3	(Sweden) M Wilander	6	6

Third round
6	(United States) A Krickstein	6	4	5
12	(Ecuador) A Gómez	3	6	7
(Sweden) N Kroon	3	2
3	(Sweden) M Wilander	6	6

Quarterfinals
12	(Ecuador) A Gómez	0	6
3	(Sweden) M Wilander	6	7

==== Section 4 ====
First round
7	(Soviet Union) A Chesnokov	6	7
Q	(United States) S Salumaa	0	5
(Netherlands) M Schapers	4	6	3
(South Africa) G Muller	6	2	6
(France) É Winogradsky	3	6	3
Q	(United States) F Hunt	6	1	6
(United States) M Anger	1	3
10	(Sweden) J Svensson	6	6
16	(United States) D Rostagno	6	5	3
(Argentina) J Frana	3	7	6
(India) R Krishnan	1	6	7
WC	(United States) B Scanlon	6	3	6
WC	(United States) B Pearce	3	6	7
WC	(United States) M Robertson	6	4	5
(South Africa) B Moir	4	3
2	(Sweden) S Edberg	6	6

Second round
7	(Soviet Union) A Chesnokov	3	4
(South Africa) G Muller	6	6
Q	(United States) F Hunt
10	(Sweden) J Svensson	w/o
(Argentina) J Frana	6	6	2^{r}
(India) R Krishnan	4	7	4
WC	(United States) B Pearce	4	1
2	(Sweden) S Edberg	6	6

Third round
(South Africa) G Muller	4	2
10	(Sweden) J Svensson	6	6
(India) R Krishnan	4	6	4
2	(Sweden) S Edberg	6	3	6

Quarterfinals
10	(Sweden) J Svensson	4	6
2	(Sweden) S Edberg	6	7
