= 1989 Volvo International – Doubles =

Doubles
- 1989 Volvo International
- 1988 Champions: (Mexico) Jorge Lozano (United States) Todd Witsken

Final
- Champions: (Australia) Mark Kratzmann (Australia) Wally Masur
- Runners-up: (South Africa) Pieter Aldrich (South Africa) Danie Visser
- Score: 6–3, 4–6, 7–6

Details
- Draw: 32
- Seeds: 8

Events
| Singles | Doubles |
| ← 1988 · | Volvo International | · 1990 → |

Jorge Lozano and Todd Witsken were the defending champions but did not compete that year.

Mark Kratzmann and Wally Masur won in the final 6–3, 4–6, 7–6 against Pieter Aldrich and Danie Visser.

== Seeds ==
Champion seeds are indicated in bold text while text in italics indicates the round in which those seeds were eliminated.

1. (United States) Rick Leach / (United States) Jim Pugh (quarterfinals)
2. (United States) Jim Grabb / (United States) Patrick McEnroe (semifinals)
3. (United States) Ken Flach / (United States) Robert Seguso (quarterfinals)
4. (South Africa) Pieter Aldrich / (South Africa) Danie Visser (final)
5. (United States) Scott Davis / (United States) David Pate (semifinals)
6. (United States) Jim Courier / (United States) Pete Sampras (second round)
7. (Australia) **Mark Kratzmann** / (Australia) **Wally Masur (champions)**
8. (Canada) Grant Connell / (Canada) Glenn Michibata (quarterfinals)

== Draw ==
=== Key ===
- Q = Qualifier
- WC = Wild card
- LL = Lucky loser
- Alt = Alternate
- SE = Special exempt
- PR = Protected ranking
- ITF = ITF entry
- JE = Junior exempt
- w/o = Walkover
- r = Retired
- d = Defaulted
- SR = Special ranking

=== Final ===
| Final |
| 7 | (Australia) **Mark Kratzmann** (Australia) **Wally Masur** | **6** | 4 | **7** |
| 4 | (South Africa) Pieter Aldrich (South Africa) Danie Visser | 3 | **6** | 6 |

=== Top half ===
First round
1 | (United States) **R Leach** (United States) **J Pugh** | **6** | **6**
(United States) S Giammalva Jr. (United States) G Layendecker | 4 | 2
(United States) J Berger (Australia) R Fromberg | 4 | 5
(United Kingdom) **J Bates** (Netherlands) **M Schapers** | **6** | **7**
(Canada) M Laurendeau (United States) B Pearce | 4 | 2
(United States) **T Pawsat** (Australia) **L Warder** | **6** | **6**
(United States) C Beckman (United States) S Cannon | **6** | 3 | 4
7 | (Australia) **M Kratzmann** (Australia) **W Masur** | 4 | **6** | **6**
3 | (United States) **K Flach** (United States) **R Seguso** | **7** | **7**
(United States) K Curren (United States) J Kriek | 6 | 5
(United States) M Davis (United States) D Goldie | 6 | **7** | 6
(United States) **P Chamberlin** (United States) **T Wilkison** | **7** | 6 | **7**
WC | (United States) P Annacone (France) Y Noah | **6** | 6 | 6
(United States) **M Flur** (United States) **T Siegel** | 3 | **7** | **7**
(Venezuela) A Mora (Venezuela) N Pereira | 3 | **7** | 4
5 | (United States) **S Davis** (United States) **D Pate** | **6** | 6 | **6**

Second round
1 | (United States) **R Leach** (United States) **J Pugh** | **6** | **7**
(United Kingdom) J Bates (Netherlands) M Schapers | 4 | 6
(United States) T Pawsat (Australia) L Warder | 5 | 4
7 | (Australia) **M Kratzmann** (Australia) **W Masur** | **7** | **6**
3 | (United States) **K Flach** (United States) **R Seguso** | **7** | **7**
(United States) P Chamberlin (United States) T Wilkison | 6 | 6
(United States) M Flur (United States) T Siegel | 6 | 5
5 | (United States) **S Davis** (United States) **D Pate** | **7** | **7**

Quarterfinals
1 | (United States) R Leach (United States) J Pugh | **7** | 6 | 3
7 | (Australia) **M Kratzmann** (Australia) **W Masur** | 6 | **7** | **6**
3 | (United States) K Flach (United States) R Seguso | 5 | 3
5 | (United States) **S Davis** (United States) **D Pate** | **7** | **6**

Semifinals
7 | (Australia) **M Kratzmann** (Australia) **W Masur** | **6** | **7**
5 | (United States) S Davis (United States) D Pate | 4 | 6

=== Bottom half ===
First round
6 | (United States) **J Courier** (United States) **P Sampras** | **6** | 4 | **6**
(Puerto Rico) M Nido (South Africa) M Robertson | 4 | **6** | 3
(United States) **D Rostagno** (United States) **R Schmidt** | **7** | **6**
(United Kingdom) N Broad (South Africa) G Muller | 6 | 3
(United States) **M Chang** (United States) **B Gottfried** | **6** | **6**
(United States) D Cassidy (United States) B Garnett | 3 | 4
(United States) J Palmer (United States) S Warner | 6 | 4
4 | (South Africa) **P Aldrich** (South Africa) **D Visser** | **7** | **6**
8 | (Canada) **G Connell** (Canada) **G Michibata** | **6** | **6**
(United States) S Bryan (United States) A Parker | 4 | 3
(Australia) C Limberger (Australia) S Youl | **7** | 4 | 3
(Argentina) **J Frana** (Israel) **A Mansdorf** | 5 | **6** | **6**
(United States) **J Tarango** (United States) **D Wheaton** | **6** | **6**
(United States) R Baxter (Belgium) L Pimek | 4 | 3
(United Kingdom) C Bailey (United States) R Pellizzi | 2 | 4
2 | (United States) **J Grabb** (United States) **P McEnroe** | **6** | **6**

Second round
6 | (United States) J Courier (United States) P Sampras | 6 | 3
(United States) **D Rostagno** (United States) **R Schmidt** | **7** | **6**
(United States) M Chang (United States) B Gottfried | **6** | 3 | 2
4 | (South Africa) **P Aldrich** (South Africa) **D Visser** | 4 | **6** | **6**
8 | (Canada) **G Connell** (Canada) **G Michibata** | **7** | **7**
(Argentina) J Frana (Israel) A Mansdorf | 6 | 6
(United States) J Tarango (United States) D Wheaton | 6 | 2
2 | (United States) **J Grabb** (United States) **P McEnroe** | **7** | **6**

Quarterfinals
(United States) D Rostagno (United States) R Schmidt | 6 | 6
4 | (South Africa) **P Aldrich** (South Africa) **D Visser** | **7** | **7**
8 | (Canada) G Connell (Canada) G Michibata | **6** | 3 | 4
2 | (United States) **J Grabb** (United States) **P McEnroe** | 4 | **6** | **6**

Semifinals
4 | (South Africa) **P Aldrich** (South Africa) **D Visser** | **7** | **6**
2 | (United States) J Grabb (United States) P McEnroe | 5 | 3
