= Richard Schmidt (tennis) =

American tennis player

- Full name: Richard Schmidt
- Country (sports): United States
- Born: January 31, 1965 (age 60); Harvey, Illinois
- Plays: Right-handed
- Prize money: $98,332

Singles
- Career record: 1–12
- Career titles: 0
- Highest ranking: No. 240 (October 12, 1992)

Grand Slam singles results
- Australian Open: 1R (1988)
- US Open: 1R (1989)

Doubles
- Career record: 9–18
- Career titles: 0
- Highest ranking: No. 156 (October 11, 1993)

Grand Slam doubles results
- Australian Open: 3R (1988)

Richard Schmidt (born January 31, 1965) is a former professional tennis player from the United States.

== Biography ==
Born in Chicago, Schmidt later moved to Madison, Wisconsin and was on the collegiate team at the University of Arkansas. He twice earned All-American honors while partnering Tim Siegel in doubles. The pair were semi-finalists in the 1986 NCAA Championships.

From the start of 1987 he began competing on the professional circuit. As a qualifier at the 1988 Australian Open he pushed eighth seed Slobodan Živojinović to four sets in the first round, losing two of those sets in tiebreaks. At his only other appearance in the men's singles draw of a Grand Slam, the 1989 US Open, he squandered a two-set lead over Miguel Nido in the opening round, to lose in five. He continued to appear in the qualifying rounds of Grand Slams, including at Wimbledon, but was unable to make it through again, although he did manage to get past Pat Rafter in the 1992 US Open qualifiers. On the ATP Tour his most noted performance came at the 1992 Cincinnati Open, a top-tier Championship Series (Masters) tournament, where he beat Jeff Tarango, before losing in the second round to world number one Jim Courier.

As a doubles player his best performances include making the third round of the 1988 Australian Open, with Tim Siegel. At the 1989 Volvo International in Stratton Mountain, he and Derrick Rostagno had a win over a doubles team consisting of Jim Courier and Pete Sampras. He won a total of four Challenger doubles titles.

== Challenger titles ==
=== Doubles: (4) ===
No.	Year	Tournament	Surface	Partner	Opponents	Score
1.	1992	Halifax, Canada	Hard	(South Africa) Ellis Ferreira	(Sweden) Mårten Renström (Norway) Christian Ruud	4–6, 6–1, 6–4
2.	1993	Vancouver, Canada	Hard	(South Africa) Ellis Ferreira	(United States) Richard Matuszewski (United States) John Sullivan	7–5, 4–6, 6–3
3.	1993	Acapulco, Mexico	Clay	(South Africa) Ellis Ferreira	(Argentina) Javier Frana (Argentina) Juan Garat	7–6, 6–4
4.	1993	São Paulo, Brazil	Clay	(The Bahamas) Mark Knowles	(Argentina) Juan Garat (Russia) Andrei Merinov	6–4, 6–4
