= Tertius Reynders =

- Country (sports): South Africa

Singles
- Career record: 0–1
- Highest ranking: No. 341 (13 Mar 1989)

Grand Slam singles results
- Wimbledon: Q1 (1988, 1989)

Doubles
- Career record: 0–1
- Highest ranking: No. 424 (13 Jun 1988)

Tertius Reynders is a South African former professional tennis player.

Reynders, who played a year of collegiate tennis at the University of Tulsa before turning professional, reached a best singles world ranking of 341 during his career. He twice featured in the qualifying draw at Wimbledon and made his only Grand Prix/ATP Tour singles main draw appearance at the 1989 Volvo International in Stratton Mountain.
