= 1989 Volvo International =

- Date: July 31 – August 7
- Edition: 17th
- Category: Grand Prix
- Draw: 64S / 32D
- Prize money: $400,000
- Surface: Hard / Outdoor
- Location: Stratton Mountain, Vermont
- Venue: Stratton Mountain Resort

Champions

Singles
- (United States) Brad Gilbert

Doubles
- (Australia) Mark Kratzmann / (Australia) Wally Masur
- Volvo International

The 1989 Volvo International was a men's tennis tournament played on outdoor hard courts at the Stratton Mountain Resort in Stratton Mountain, Vermont, United States, and was part of the 1989 Nabisco Grand Prix. The tournament ran from July 31 through August 7, 1989. Third-seeded Brad Gilbert won the singles title.

== Finals ==
=== Singles ===
(United States) Brad Gilbert defeated (United States) Jim Pugh 7–5, 6–0

- It was Gilbert's 2nd title of the year and the 16th of his career.

=== Doubles ===
(Australia) Mark Kratzmann / (Australia) Wally Masur defeated (South Africa) Pieter Aldrich / (South Africa) Danie Visser 6–3, 4–6, 7–6

- It was Kratzmann's 2nd title of the year and the 7th of his career. It was Masur's 2nd title of the year and the 12th of his career.
