= Richard Matuszewski =

American tennis player

- Country (sports): United States
- Residence: Tampa, Florida, United States
- Born: 7 September 1964 (age 61); Newark, New Jersey, United States
- Height: 1.88 m (6 ft 2 in)
- Turned pro: 1986
- Plays: Right-handed
- Prize money: $550,506

Singles
- Career record: 54–80
- Career titles: 0; 2 Challenger, 0 Futures
- Highest ranking: No. 49 (24 October 1988)

Grand Slam singles results
- Australian Open: 2R (1987, 1989)
- French Open: 1R (1990)
- Wimbledon: 4R (1993)
- US Open: 2R (1985)

Doubles
- Career record: 26–52
- Career titles: 0; 4 Challenger, 0 Futures
- Highest ranking: No. 87 (17 April 1989)

Grand Slam doubles results
- Australian Open: 2R (1989)
- Wimbledon: 1R (1988, 1989)
- US Open: 2R (1989)
- Last updated on: 7 June 2022.

Richard Matuszewski (matt-too-CHef-ski), born September 7, 1964, in Newark, New Jersey, is a former tennis player from the United States.

Matuszewski won the Van Nostrand Memorial Award in 1986 and is a four-time All-American. He was named All-American in singles and doubles in 1985 and 1986. He ranks second on the Clemson Career List for most singles victories with 166 and fourth on the Clemson career list for most doubles victories with 125. He was a 1983 ACC Champion at number six singles, the 1984 ACC Champion at number five singles and the 1985 ACC Champion at number one doubles.

Matuszewski went on to play professional tennis for over a decade. On October 24, 1988, he reached his highest rank with the Association of Tennis Professionals (ATP), when he became World number 49.

== ATP career finals ==
=== Singles: 1 (1 runner-up) ===
Legend Grand Slam Tournaments (0–0) ATP World Tour Finals (0–0) ATP World Tour Masters Series (0–0) ATP Championship Series (0–0) ATP World Series (0–1)	Finals by surface Hard (0–1) Clay (0–0) Grass (0–0) Carpet (0–0)	Finals by setting Outdoors (0–0) Indoors (0–1)

Result	W–L	Date	Tournament	Tier	Surface	Opponent	Score
Loss	0–1	Oct 1988	Sydney, Australia	Grand Prix	Hard	(Socialist Federal Republic of Yugoslavia) Slobodan Živojinović	6–7^{(8–10)}, 3–6, 4–6

== ATP Challenger and ITF Futures finals ==
=== Singles: 5 (2–3) ===
Legend ATP Challenger (2–3) ITF Futures (0–0)	Finals by surface Hard (2–3) Clay (0–0) Grass (0–0) Carpet (0–0)

Result	W–L	Date	Tournament	Tier	Surface	Opponent	Score
Win	1–0	Dec 1991	Guam, United States	Challenger	Hard	(Australia) Jamie Morgan	6–4, ret.
Loss	1–1	Jul 1992	Gramado, Brazil	Challenger	Hard	(Italy) Nicola Bruno	2–6, 2–6
Win	2–1	Jul 1992	Campos do Jordão, Brazil	Challenger	Hard	(Brazil) Danilo Marcelino	4–6, 7–6, 7–6
Loss	2–2	Dec 1992	Guangzhou, China	Challenger	Hard	(India) Leander Paes	3–6, 3–6
Loss	2–3	May 1993	Taipei, Taiwan	Challenger	Hard	(Australia) Jason Stoltenberg	0–6, 3–6

=== Doubles: 10 (4–6) ===
Legend ATP Challenger (4–6) ITF Futures (0–0)	Finals by surface Hard (4–6) Clay (0–0) Grass (0–0) Carpet (0–0)

Result	W–L	Date	Tournament	Tier	Surface	Partner	Opponents	Score
Win	1–0	Apr 1989	Setúbal, Portugal	Challenger	Hard	(United States) Steve Devries	(United Kingdom) David Felgate (United Kingdom) Stephen Shaw	6–3, 6–1
Loss	1–1	Apr 1992	Jerusalem, Israel	Challenger	Hard	(United States) Brian Joelson	(New Zealand) Steve Guy (Australia) Carl Limberger	6–7, 2–6
Win	2–1	Jul 1992	Gramado, Brazil	Challenger	Hard	(United States) John Sullivan	(Brazil) Nelson Aerts (Brazil) Fernando Roese	7–6, 6–7, 6–3
Loss	2–2	Oct 1992	Monterrey, Mexico	Challenger	Hard	(United States) John Sullivan	(The Bahamas) Mark Knowles (United States) Alex O'Brien	6–3, 3–6, 6–7
Loss	2–3	Dec 1992	Guangzhou, China	Challenger	Hard	(United States) John Sullivan	(United States) Kent Kinnear (Germany) Christian Saceanu	7–6, 3–6, 4–6
Loss	2–4	Dec 1992	Hong Kong, Hong Kong	Challenger	Hard	(United States) John Sullivan	(United States) Donald Johnson (India) Leander Paes	2–6, 6–7
Loss	2–5	Feb 1993	Vancouver, Canada	Challenger	Hard	(United States) John Sullivan	(South Africa) Ellis Ferreira (United States) Richard Schmidt	5–7, 6–4, 3–6
Win	3–5	Sep 1993	Caracas, Venezuela	Challenger	Hard	(United States) John Sullivan	(United States) Doug Flach (Venezuela) Nicolas Pereira	7–6, 7–5
Loss	3–6	May 1994	Manila, Philippines	Challenger	Hard	(South Africa) David Nainkin	(Canada) Albert Chang (India) Leander Paes	4–6, 4–6
Win	4–6	Jul 1994	Campos do Jordao, Brazil	Challenger	Hard	(Argentina) Patricio Arnold	(Brazil) Marcelo Saliola (Brazil) Fabio Silberberg	6–3, 6–4

== Performance timelines ==
Key
W	F	SF	QF	#R	RR	Q#	DNQ	A	NH

(W) winner; (F) finalist; (SF) semifinalist; (QF) quarterfinalist; (#R) rounds 4, 3, 2, 1; (RR) round-robin stage; (Q#) qualification round; (DNQ) did not qualify; (A) absent; (NH) not held; (SR) strike rate (events won / competed); (W–L) win–loss record.

=== Singles ===
Tournament	1985	1986	1987	1988	1989	1990	1991	1992	1993	1994	1995	SR	W–L	Win %
Grand Slam tournaments
Australian Open	A	A	2R	A	2R	A	Q1	A	A	A	A	0 / 2	1–2	33%
French Open	A	A	A	A	A	1R	A	A	A	A	Q1	0 / 1	0–1	0%
Wimbledon	A	A	A	A	2R	A	A	A	4R	A	Q2	0 / 2	4–2	67%
US Open	2R	A	1R	A	1R	1R	A	1R	Q1	Q1	A	0 / 5	1–5	17%
Win–loss	1–1	0–0	0–2	0–0	2–3	0–2	0–0	0–1	3–1	0–0	0–0	0 / 10	6–10	38%
ATP Masters Series
Miami	A	A	2R	A	1R	1R	A	A	A	A	Q1	0 / 3	1–3	25%
Canada	A	A	1R	1R	A	A	A	A	A	A	A	0 / 2	0–2	0%
Cincinnati	A	A	A	A	1R	A	A	A	A	A	A	0 / 1	0–1	0%
Paris	A	A	A	1R	1R	A	A	A	Q1	Q1	Q1	0 / 2	0–2	0%
Win–loss	0–0	0–0	1–2	0–2	0–3	0–1	0–0	0–0	0–0	0–0	0–0	0 / 8	1–8	11%

=== Doubles ===
Tournament	1987	1988	1989	1990	1991	1992	1993	1994	1995	SR	W–L	Win %
Grand Slam tournaments
Australian Open	1R	A	2R	A	A	A	A	A	A	0 / 2	1–2	33%
French Open	A	A	A	A	A	A	A	A	A	0 / 0	0–0	–
Wimbledon	A	1R	1R	A	A	A	A	A	Q3	0 / 2	0–2	0%
US Open	A	1R	2R	A	A	A	A	Q1	A	0 / 2	1–2	33%
Win–loss	0–1	0–2	2–3	0–0	0–0	0–0	0–0	0–0	0–0	0 / 6	2–6	25%
ATP Masters Series
Miami	1R	A	QF	A	A	A	A	A	A	0 / 2	3–2	60%
Canada	A	2R	A	A	A	A	A	A	A	0 / 1	1–1	50%
Cincinnati	A	A	1R	A	A	A	A	A	A	0 / 1	0–1	0%
Win–loss	0–1	1–1	3–2	0–0	0–0	0–0	0–0	0–0	0–0	0 / 4	4–4	50%
