= Pieter Aldrich =

South African tennis player

- Country (sports): South Africa
- Residence: Vereeniging, South Africa
- Born: 7 September 1965 (age 59); Johannesburg, South Africa
- Height: 1.80 m (5 ft 11 in)
- Turned pro: 1987
- Plays: Right-handed
- Prize money: $790,019

Singles
- Career record: 36–40
- Career titles: 1; 1 Challenger, 0 Futures
- Highest ranking: No. 64 (21 November 1988)

Grand Slam singles results
- Australian Open: 1R (1989, 1990)
- Wimbledon: 2R (1988, 1989)
- US Open: 3R (1988, 1989)

Doubles
- Career record: 148–83
- Career titles: 9; 2 Challenger, 0 Futures
- Highest ranking: No. 1 (23 July 1990)

Grand Slam doubles results
- Australian Open: W (1990)
- French Open: QF (1990)
- Wimbledon: F (1990)
- US Open: W (1990)

Other doubles tournaments
- Tour Finals: RR (1990)

Grand Slam mixed doubles results
- Australian Open: 1R (1992)
- French Open: 3R (1990)
- Wimbledon: QF (1990)
- US Open: SF (1989)

Pieter ("Piet") Aldrich (born 7 September 1965) is a former professional tennis player from South Africa. A doubles specialist, he won two Grand Slam men's doubles titles (Australian Open and US Open) and became the world No. 1 in doubles in 1990.

== Career ==
Aldrich won the first of nine career doubles titles in 1988 at Charleston, South Carolina.

In 1990, Aldrich won the men's doubles titles at both the Australian Open and the US Open, partnering his fellow South African player Danie Visser. The pair were also doubles runners-up at Wimbledon that year.

1990 also saw Aldrich win his first (and only) top-level singles title at Newport, Rhode Island. His career-high ranking in singles was world No. 64, which he achieved in 1988.

Aldrich won the final doubles title of his career in 1992 in Johannesburg.

== Grand Slam finals ==
=== Doubles (2 wins, 1 loss) ===
Result	Year	Championship	Surface	Partner	Opponents	Score
Win	1990	Australian Open	Hard	(South Africa) Danie Visser	(Canada) Grant Connell (Canada) Glenn Michibata	6–4, 4–6, 6–1, 6–4
Loss	1990	Wimbledon	Grass	(South Africa) Danie Visser	(United States) Rick Leach (United States) Jim Pugh	6–7^{(5–7)}, 6–7^{(4–7)}, 6–7^{(5–7)}
Win	1990	US Open	Hard	(South Africa) Danie Visser	(United States) Paul Annacone (United States) David Wheaton	6–2, 7–6^{(7–3)}, 6–2

== ATP career finals ==
=== Singles: 1 (1 title) ===
Legend Grand Slam Tournaments (0–0) ATP World Tour Finals (0–0) ATP Masters 1000 Series (0–0) ATP 500 Series (0–0) ATP 250 Series (1–0)	Finals by surface Hard (0–0) Clay (0–0) Grass (1–0) Carpet (0–0)	Finals by setting Outdoors (1–0) Indoors (0–0)

Result	W–L	Date	Tournament	Tier	Surface	Opponent	Score
Win	1–0	Jul 1990	Newport, United States	World Series	Grass	(Australia) Darren Cahill	7–6^{(12–10)}, 1–6, 6–1

=== Doubles: 19 (9 titles, 10 runner-ups) ===
Legend Grand Slam Tournaments (2–1) ATP World Tour Finals (0–0) ATP Masters 1000 Series (0–1) ATP 500 Series (1–0) ATP 250 Series (6–8)	Finals by surface Hard (5–6) Clay (2–2) Grass (0–2) Carpet (2–0)	Finals by setting Outdoors (6–9) Indoors (3–1)

Result	W–L	Date	Tournament	Tier	Surface	Partner	Opponents	Score
Win	1–0	May 1988	Charleston, United States	Grand Prix	Clay	(South Africa) Danie Visser	(Mexico) Jorge Lozano (United States) Todd Witsken	7–6, 6–3
Loss	1–1	May 1988	Forest Hills, United States	Grand Prix	Clay	(South Africa) Danie Visser	(Mexico) Jorge Lozano (United States) Todd Witsken	3–6, 6–7
Loss	1–2	Jun 1988	Queen's, United Kingdom	Grand Prix	Grass	(South Africa) Danie Visser	(United States) Ken Flach (United States) Robert Seguso	2–6, 6–7
Loss	1–3	Aug 1988	Stratton Mountain, United States	Grand Prix	Hard	(South Africa) Danie Visser	(Mexico) Jorge Lozano (United States) Todd Witsken	3–6, 6–7
Loss	1–4	Jan 1989	Sydney, Australia	Grand Prix	Hard	(South Africa) Danie Visser	(Australia) Darren Cahill (Australia) Wally Masur	4–6, 3–6
Loss	1–5	Aug 1989	Stratton Mountain, United States	Grand Prix	Hard	(South Africa) Danie Visser	(Australia) Mark Kratzmann (Australia) Wally Masur	3–6, 6–4, 6–7
Win	2–5	Aug 1989	Indianapolis, United States	Grand Prix	Hard	(South Africa) Danie Visser	(Australia) Peter Doohan (Australia) Laurie Warder	7–6, 7–6
Loss	2–6	Aug 1989	Cincinnati, United States	Grand Prix	Hard	(South Africa) Danie Visser	(United States) Ken Flach (United States) Robert Seguso	4–6, 4–6
Win	3–6	Oct 1989	San Francisco, United States	Grand Prix	Carpet	(South Africa) Danie Visser	(United States) Paul Annacone (South Africa) Christo van Rensburg	6–4, 6–3
Win	4–6	Nov 1989	Frankfurt, Germany	Grand Prix	Carpet	(South Africa) Danie Visser	(Australia) Kevin Curren (Germany) Eric Jelen	7–6, 6–7, 6–3
Loss	4–7	Jan 1990	Sydney, Australia	World Series	Hard	(South Africa) Danie Visser	(Australia) Pat Cash (Australia) Mark Kratzmann	4–6, 5–7
Win	5–7	Jan 1990	Melbourne, Australia	Grand Slam	Hard	(South Africa) Danie Visser	(Canada) Grant Connell (Canada) Glenn Michibata	6–4, 4–6, 6–1, 6–4
Loss	5–8	Jul 1990	Wimbledon, United Kingdom	Grand Slam	Grass	(South Africa) Danie Visser	(United States) Rick Leach (United States) Jim Pugh	6–7, 6–7, 6–7
Win	6–8	Jul 1990	Stuttgart, Germany	Championship Series	Clay	(South Africa) Danie Visser	(Sweden) Per Henricsson (Sweden) Nicklas Utgren	6–3, 6–4
Win	7–8	Sep 1990	Flushing Meadows, United States	Grand Slam	Hard	(South Africa) Danie Visser	(United States) Paul Annacone (United States) David Wheaton	6–2, 7–6, 6–2
Win	8–8	Oct 1990	Berlin, Germany	World Series	Carpet	(South Africa) Danie Visser	(United States) Kevin Curren (United States) Patrick Galbraith	7–6, 7–6
Loss	8–9	Feb 1992	San Francisco, United States	World Series	Hard	(South Africa) Danie Visser	(United States) Jim Grabb (United States) Richey Reneberg	4–6, 5–7
Win	9–9	Apr 1992	Johannesburg, South Africa	World Series	Hard	(South Africa) Danie Visser	(South Africa) Wayne Ferreira (South Africa) Piet Norval	6–4, 6–4
Loss	9–10	Apr 1992	Nice, France	World Series	Clay	(South Africa) Danie Visser	(United States) Patrick Galbraith (United States) Scott Melville	1–6, 6–3, 4–6

== ATP Challenger and ITF Futures finals ==
=== Singles: 2 (1–1) ===
Legend ATP Challenger (1–1) ITF Futures (0–0)	Finals by surface Hard (0–1) Clay (0–0) Grass (1–0) Carpet (0–0)

Result	W–L	Date	Tournament	Tier	Surface	Opponent	Score
Loss	0–1	Apr 1989	Cape Town, South Africa	Challenger	Hard	(South Africa) Christo Van Rensburg	3–6, 1–6
Win	1–1	Jul 1989	Johannesburg, South Africa	Challenger	Grass	(South Africa) Wayne Ferreira	6–3, 6–3

=== Doubles: 2 (2–0) ===
Legend ATP Challenger (2–0) ITF Futures (0–0)	Finals by surface Hard (1–0) Clay (0–0) Grass (1–0) Carpet (0–0)

Result	W–L	Date	Tournament	Tier	Surface	Partner	Opponents	Score
Win	1–0	Jul 1989	Johannesburg, South Africa	Challenger	Grass	(South Africa) Danie Visser	(South Africa) David Adams (South Africa) Dean Botha	7–6, 6–4
Win	2–0	Mar 1992	Indian Wells, United States	Challenger	Hard	(South Africa) Danie Visser	(United States) Mike Briggs (United States) Trevor Kronemann	7–6, 2–6, 7–5

== Performance timelines ==
Key
W	F	SF	QF	#R	RR	Q#	DNQ	A	NH

(W) winner; (F) finalist; (SF) semifinalist; (QF) quarterfinalist; (#R) rounds 4, 3, 2, 1; (RR) round-robin stage; (Q#) qualification round; (DNQ) did not qualify; (A) absent; (NH) not held; (SR) strike rate (events won / competed); (W–L) win–loss record.

=== Singles ===
Tournament	1987	1988	1989	1990	1991	1992	SR	W–L	Win %
Grand Slam tournaments
Australian Open	A	1R	1R	A	Q3	Q1	0 / 2	0–2	0%
French Open	A	A	A	A	A	A	0 / 0	0–0	–
Wimbledon	Q2	2R	2R	Q2	A	A	0 / 2	2–2	50%
US Open	A	3R	3R	A	A	A	0 / 2	4–2	67%
Win–loss	0–0	3–3	3–3	0–0	0–0	0–0	0 / 6	6–6	50%
ATP Masters Series
Indian Wells	A	1R	A	A	A	A	0 / 1	0–1	0%
Miami	A	2R	2R	1R	A	A	0 / 3	2–3	40%
Cincinnati	A	2R	2R	A	A	A	0 / 2	2–2	50%
Win–loss	0–0	2–3	2–2	0–1	0–0	0–0	0 / 6	4–6	40%

=== Doubles ===
Tournament	1987	1988	1989	1990	1991	1992	1993	1994	1995	SR	W–L	Win %
Grand Slam tournaments
Australian Open	A	A	3R	W	1R	3R	A	A	A	1 / 4	10–3	77%
French Open	A	1R	A	QF	A	2R	A	A	A	0 / 3	4–3	57%
Wimbledon	3R	QF	QF	F	A	1R	A	A	A	0 / 5	13–5	72%
US Open	1R	1R	2R	W	A	A	A	A	A	1 / 4	7–3	70%
Win–loss	2–2	3–3	6–3	20–2	0–1	3–3	0–0	0–0	0–0	2 / 16	34–14	71%
Year-end Championships
ATP Finals	DNQ			RR	Did not qualify					0 / 1	1–2	33%
ATP Masters Series
Indian Wells	A	A	SF	2R	1R	1R	A	A	Q1	0 / 4	3–4	43%
Miami	A	2R	SF	2R	QF	2R	A	A	A	0 / 5	8–5	62%
Monte Carlo	A	A	A	A	2R	2R	A	A	A	0 / 2	1–2	33%
Hamburg	A	A	SF	A	A	2R	A	A	A	0 / 2	3–2	60%
Rome	A	A	1R	A	A	A	A	A	A	0 / 1	0–1	0%
Cincinnati	A	1R	F	QF	A	A	A	A	A	0 / 3	5–3	63%
Paris	A	QF	SF	2R	A	A	A	A	A	0 / 3	3–3	50%
Win–loss	0–0	2–3	15–6	1–4	2–3	3–4	0–0	0–0	0–0	0 / 20	23–20	53%

=== Mixed Doubles ===
Tournament	1988	1989	1990	1991	1992	SR	W–L	Win %
Grand Slam tournaments
Australian Open	A	A	A	A	1R	0 / 1	0–1	0%
French Open	A	A	3R	A	2R	0 / 2	3–2	60%
Wimbledon	2R	1R	QF	A	1R	0 / 4	4–4	50%
US Open	A	SF	QF	A	A	0 / 2	5–2	71%
Win–loss	1–1	3–2	7–3	0–0	1–3	0 / 9	12–9	57%
