= 1989 Thriftway ATP Championship =

- Date: August 14–20
- Edition: 88th
- Category: Grand Prix circuit
- Draw: 64S / 32D
- Prize money: $485,000
- Surface: Hard / outdoor
- Location: Mason, Ohio, U.S.
- Venue: Lindner Family Tennis Center

Champions

Singles
- (United States) Brad Gilbert

Doubles
- (United States) Ken Flach / (United States) Robert Seguso
← 1988 ·	Cincinnati Open	· 1990 →

The 1989 Thriftway ATP Championship, also known as the Cincinnati Open, was a men's tennis tournament played on outdoor hard courts at the Lindner Family Tennis Center in Mason, Ohio in the United States that was part of the 1989 Nabisco Grand Prix. The tournament was held from August 14 through August 20, 1989. Fifth-seeded Brad Gilbert won the singles title.

== Finals ==
=== Singles ===
(United States) Brad Gilbert defeated (Sweden) Stefan Edberg 6–4, 2–6, 7–6

- It was Gilbert's 4th title of the year and the 18th of his career.

=== Doubles ===
(United States) Ken Flach / (United States) Robert Seguso defeated (South Africa) Pieter Aldrich / (South Africa) Danie Visser 6–4, 6–4

- It was Flach's 2nd title of the year and the 26th of his career. It was Seguso's 2nd title of the year and the 26th of his career.
