= Miguel Nido =

Puerto Rican tennis player

- Country (sports): Puerto Rico
- Born: March 8, 1963 (age 62)
- Height: 5 ft 11 in (180 cm)
- Plays: Right-handed
- Prize money: $150,021

Singles
- Career record: 16–25
- Highest ranking: No. 120 (April 23, 1990)

Grand Slam singles results
- US Open: 3R (1989)

Doubles
- Career record: 14–22
- Highest ranking: No. 146 (April 9, 1990)

Grand Slam doubles results
- French Open: 2R (1990)
Medal record
Pan American Games
Gold medal – first place	1991 Havana	Men's Team

Miguel Nido (born March 8, 1963) is a former tennis player from Puerto Rico, who represented his native country at the 1992 Summer Olympics in Barcelona. Partnering Juan Rios, the pair was defeated in the first round by Italy's Diego Nargiso and Omar Camporese. The right-hander reached his highest singles ATP-ranking on April 23, 1990, when he became the number 120 of the world.
