= 1988 Bristol Trophy – Singles =

Singles
- 1988 Bristol Trophy

Final
- Champion: (West Germany) Christian Saceanu
- Runner-up: (India) Ramesh Krishnan
- Score: 6–4, 2–6, 6–2

Details
- Draw: 48
- Seeds: 16

Events
Singles	Doubles
← 1987 ·	Bristol Trophy	· 1989 →

Kelly Evernden was the defending champion, but lost in the third round this year.

Christian Saceanu won the title, defeating Ramesh Krishnan 6–4, 2–6, 6–2 in the final.

== Seeds ==
1. (Sweden) Jonas Svensson (second round)
2. (Netherlands) Michiel Schapers (third round)
3. (India) Ramesh Krishnan (final)
4. (Sweden) Magnus Gustafsson (third round)
5. (West Germany) Eric Jelen (quarterfinals)
6. (New Zealand) Kelly Evernden (third round)
7. (United Kingdom) Jeremy Bates (second round)
8. (West Germany) Christian Saceanu (champion)
9. (United States) Tim Wilkison (second round)
10. (France) Jérôme Potier (third round)
11. (Belgium) Eduardo Masso (quarterfinals)
12. (West Germany) Patrik Kühnen (third round)
13. (Argentina) Javier Frana (third round)
14. (United States) Todd Nelson (second round)
15. (United Kingdom) Andrew Castle (second round)
16. (United States) Martin Davis (third round)

== Draw ==
=== Key ===
- Q = Qualifier
- WC = Wild card
- LL = Lucky loser
- Alt = Alternate
- ITF = ITF entry
- PR = Protected ranking
- SR = Special ranking
- SE = Special exempt
- JE = Junior exempt
- JR = Junior Accelerator Programme entrant
- CO = College Accelerator Programme entrant
- NG = Next Gen Accelerator Program entrant
- w/o = Walkover
- r = Retired
- d = Defaulted

=== Finals ===
Semifinals
8	(West Germany) Christian Saceanu	6	7	6
(United States) Derrick Rostagno	7	6	4
3	(India) Ramesh Krishnan	6	6
(United States) Mark Dickson	1	4

Final
8	(West Germany) Christian Saceanu	6	2	6
3	(India) Ramesh Krishnan	4	6	2

=== Top half ===
==== Section 1 ====
First round
(United States) M Anger	6	7
(South Africa) P Aldrich	3	6
Q	(Australia) Brad Properjohn	2	3
(West Germany) A Maurer	6	6
Q	(Australia) R Barlow	1	3
LL	(Australia) N Borwick	6	6
(Kenya) P Wekesa	6	6
WC	(United Kingdom) D Felgate	3	2

Second round
1	(Sweden) J Svensson	1	4
(United States) M Anger	6	6
(West Germany) A Maurer	6	4
16	(United States) M Davis	7	6
10	(France) J Potier	6	6
LL	(Australia) N Borwick	4	4
(Kenya) P Wekesa	4	6
8	(West Germany) C Saceanu	6	7

Third round
(United States) M Anger	7	7
16	(United States) M Davis	6	5
10	(France) J Potier	6	4
8	(West Germany) C Saceanu	7	6

Quarterfinals
(United States) M Anger	3	6
8	(West Germany) C Saceanu	6	7

==== Section 2 ====
First round
Q	(Brazil) M Menezes	3	5
LL	(United States) Eric Riley	6	7
WC	(United Kingdom) C Bailey	4	5
(United States) D Rostagno	6	7
(United States) P Chamberlin	6	6
(United States) O Smith	4	2
WC	(United Kingdom) N Fulwood	6	4	6
(France) P Pech	3	6	3

Second round
4/Q	(Sweden) M Gustafsson	6	6
LL	(United States) E Riley	2	4
(United States) D Rostagno	7	6
14	(United States) T Nelson	5	4
11	(Belgium) E Masso	2	7	6
(United States) P Chamberlin	6	6	3
WC	(United Kingdom) N Fulwood	1	2
6	(New Zealand) E Evernden	6	6

Third round
4/Q	(Sweden) M Gustafsson	6	1	4
(United States) D Rostagno	2	6	6
11	(Belgium) E Masso	3	7	7
6	(New Zealand) E Evernden	6	6	5

Quarterfinals
(United States) D Rostagno	6	6
11	(Belgium) E Masso	1	3

=== Bottom half ===
==== Section 3 ====
First round
(United States) M Bauer	3	6	6
(South Africa) G Muller	6	1	4
LL	(United Kingdom) Gary Drake	6	6	11
(Senegal) Y Doumbia	7	2	9
Q	(Australia) L Warder	6	6
(Austria) A Antonitsch	4	4
(Sweden) D Engel	7	6
WC	(United Kingdom) S Botfield	6	4

Second round
5	(West Germany) E Jelen	6	6	7
(United States) M Bauer	4	7	5
LL	(United Kingdom) G Drake	1	3
12	(West Germany) P Kühnen	6	6
13	(Argentina) J Frana	2	7	6
Q	(Australia) L Warder	6	6	4
(Sweden) D Engel	3	3
3	(India) R Krishnan	6	6

Third round
5	(West Germany) E Jelen	6	4	6
12	(West Germany) P Kühnen	4	6	3
13	(Argentina) J Frana	5	6
3	(India) R Krishnan	7	7

Quarterfinals
5	(West Germany) E Jelen	3	4
3	(India) R Krishnan	6	6

==== Section 4 ====
First round
Q	(United Kingdom) D Kirk	0	4
(United Kingdom) S Shaw	6	6
(Australia) P Doohan	6	6
WC	(United Kingdom) J Turner	4	3
(United States) M Dickson	6	6
(New Zealand) D Lewis	4	4
(United States) T Pawsat	6	7
LL	(West Germany) S Heckmanns	3	5

Second round
7	(United Kingdom) J Bates	6	3
(United Kingdom) S Shaw	7	6
(Australia) P Doohan	6	5	6
9	(United States) T Wilkison	3	7	2
15	(United Kingdom) A Castle	6	3	10
(United States) M Dickson	4	6	12
(United States) T Pawsat	3	5
2	(Netherlands) M Schapers	6	7

Third round
(United Kingdom) S Shaw	3	7	6
(Australia) P Doohan	6	6	4
(United States) M Dickson	7	6
2	(Netherlands) M Schapers	6	4

Quarterfinals
(United Kingdom) S Shaw	1	5
(United States) M Dickson	6	7
