= 1988 Bristol Trophy – Doubles =

Doubles
- 1988 Bristol Trophy

Final
- Champions: (Australia) Peter Doohan (Australia) Laurie Warder
- Runners-up: (United States) Marty Davis (United States) Tim Pawsat
- Score: 2–6, 6–4, 7–5

Events
Singles	Doubles
← 1987 ·	Bristol Trophy	· 1989 →

Peter Doohan and Laurie Warder won the title, defeating Marty Davis and Tim Pawsat 2–6, 6–4, 7–5 in the final.

== Seeds ==
1. (Australia) Peter Doohan / (Australia) Laurie Warder (champions)
2. (United Kingdom) Jeremy Bates / (New Zealand) Kelly Evernden (first round)
3. (United States) Marty Davis / (United States) Tim Pawsat (final)
4. (United States) Kelly Jones / (South Africa) Gary Muller (semifinals)

== Draw ==
=== Key ===
- Q = Qualifier
- WC = Wild card
- LL = Lucky loser
- Alt = Alternate
- ITF = ITF entry
- PR = Protected ranking
- SR = Special ranking
- SE = Special exempt
- JE = Junior exempt
- JR = Junior Accelerator Programme entrant
- CO = College Accelerator Programme entrant
- NG = Next Gen Accelerator Program entrant
- w/o = Walkover
- r = Retired
- d = Defaulted

=== Draw ===
First round
1	(Australia) P Doohan (Australia) L Warder	7	7
(United States) M Bauer (United States) P Chamberlin	6	6
(Belgium) E Masso (France) J Potier	6	6	10
(United States) M Dickson (United States) T Wilkison	7	4	12
4	(United States) K Jones (South Africa) G Muller	6	6
(Sweden) D Engel (Sweden) M Gustafsson	3	4
(Senegal) Y Doumbia (United States) O Smith	7	4	5
(Argentina) J Frana (United States) T Nelson	6	6	7
WC	(United Kingdom) S Botfield (United Kingdom) J Turner	6	7	9
(Australia) R Barlow (Kenya) P Wekesa	7	6	11
(United Kingdom) A Castle (India) R Krishnan	1	3
3	(United States) M Davis (United States) T Pawsat	6	6
(Austria) A Antonitsch (West Germany) A Maurer	6	6
(Australia) Kurt Robinson (Australia) Justin Stead	3	2
(West Germany) C Saceanu (Netherlands) M Schapers	6	3	6
2	(United Kingdom) J Bates (New Zealand) K Evernden	3	6	3

Quarterfinals
1	(Australia) P Doohan (Australia) L Warder	6	6
(United States) M Dickson (United States) T Wilkison	3	2
4	(United States) K Jones (South Africa) G Muller	6	6
(Argentina) J Frana (United States) T Nelson	3	3
(Australia) R Barlow (Kenya) P Wekesa	6	1
3	(United States) M Davis (United States) T Pawsat	7	6
(Austria) A Antonitsch (West Germany) A Maurer	7	6	6
(West Germany) C Saceanu (Netherlands) M Schapers	6	7	3

Semifinals
1	(Australia) P Doohan (Australia) L Warder	6	6
4	(United States) K Jones (South Africa) G Muller	1	2
3	(United States) M Davis (United States) T Pawsat	6	6
(Austria) A Antonitsch (West Germany) A Maurer	4	4

Final
1	(Australia) P Doohan (Australia) L Warder	2	6	7
3	(United States) M Davis (United States) T Pawsat	6	4	5
