= 1989 Livingston Open – Singles =

Singles
- 1989 Livingston Open

Final
- Champion: (United States) Brad Gilbert
- Runner-up: (Australia) Jason Stoltenberg
- Score: 6–4, 6–4

Details
- Draw: 32
- Seeds: 8

Events
Singles	Doubles
- Livingston Open

Andre Agassi was the defending champion, but did not participate this year.

Brad Gilbert won the title, defeating Jason Stoltenberg 6–4, 6–4 in the final.

== Seeds ==
1. (United States) Michael Chang (second round)
2. (United States) Brad Gilbert (champion)
3. (Israel) Amos Mansdorf (first round)
4. (United States) Jim Courier (semifinals)
5. (United States) Robert Seguso (first round)
6. (New Zealand) Kelly Evernden (first round)
7. (United States) Paul Annacone (second round)
8. (India) Ramesh Krishnan (quarterfinals)

== Draw ==
Key

- Q = Qualifier
- WC = Wild card
- LL = Lucky loser
- Alt = Alternate
- ITF = ITF entry
- PR = Protected ranking
- SR = Special ranking
- SE = Special exempt
- JE = Junior exempt
- JR = Junior Accelerator Programme entrant
- CO = College Accelerator Programme entrant
- NG = Next Gen Accelerator Program entrant
- w/o = Walkover
- r = Retired
- d = Defaulted

=== Finals ===
Semifinals
(Australia) Jason Stoltenberg	6	6
(United Kingdom) Chris Bailey	4	3
4	(United States) Jim Courier	2	0
2	(United States) Brad Gilbert	6	6

Final
(Australia) Jason Stoltenberg	4	4
2	(United States) Brad Gilbert	6	6

=== Top half ===
First round
1	(United States) M Chang	6	3	6
(United States) S Warner	1	6	3
(Australia) J Stoltenberg	6	7
(United States) J Canter	4	6
Q	(United States) T Donovan	6	7
(United States) S Giammalva Jr.	2	5
Q	(United States) T Pawsat	6	6	4
7	(United States) P Annacone	4	7	6
3	(Israel) A Mansdorf	0^{r}
(Australia) R Fromberg	5
Q	(Uruguay) D Montes de Oca	5	6	3
(United Kingdom) C Bailey	7	4	6
(United States) J Ross	4	3
LL	(United States) J Klaparda	6	6
WC	(United States) M Brown	7	6
6	(New Zealand) K Evernden	5	2

Second round
1	(United States) M Chang	3	6
(Australia) J Stoltenberg	6	7
Q	(United States) T Donovan	6	6
7	(United States) P Annacone	4	2
(Australia) R Fromberg	3	5
(United Kingdom) C Bailey	6	7
LL	(United States) J Klaparda	1	4
WC	(United States) M Brown	6	6

Quarterfinals
(Australia) J Stoltenberg	6	6
Q	(United States) T Donovan	1	2
(United Kingdom) C Bailey	6	3	6
WC	(United States) M Brown	3	6	3

Semifinals
(Australia) J Stoltenberg	6	6
(United Kingdom) C Bailey	4	3

=== Bottom half ===
First round
5	(United States) R Seguso	2^{r}
(United States) J Grabb	5
(United States) J Tarango	7	6
WC	(United States) A Parker	6	2
(Italy) G Pozzi	4	3
(Austria) A Antonitsch	6	6
WC	(The Bahamas) M Knowles	1	2
4	(United States) J Courier	6	6
8	(India) R Krishnan	6	6
(Puerto Rico) M Nido	2	3
(Canada) M Laurendeau	3	4
Q	(United States) C Garner	6	6
(Nigeria) N Odizor	6	2	7
(France) P Pech	3	6	6
(United States) T Wilkison	4	1
2	(United States) B Gilbert	6	6

Second round
(United States) J Grabb	6	6
(United States) J Tarango	4	3
(Austria) A Antonitsch	1	1
4	(United States) J Courier	6	6
8	(India) R Krishnan	6	6
Q	(United States) C Garner	3	0
(Nigeria) N Odizor	5	4
2	(United States) B Gilbert	7	6

Quarterfinals
(United States) J Grabb	5	2
4	(United States) J Courier	7	6
8	(India) R Krishnan	7	3	2
2	(United States) B Gilbert	5	6	6

Semifinals
4	(United States) J Courier	2	0
2	(United States) B Gilbert	6	6
