= 1986 Bristol Trophy – Doubles =

Doubles
- 1986 Bristol Trophy

Final
- Champions: (South Africa) Christo Steyn (South Africa) Danie Visser
- Runners-up: (Australia) Mark Edmondson (Australia) Wally Masur
- Score: 6–7, 7–6, 12–10

Details
- Draw: 16
- Seeds: 4

Events
Singles	Doubles
← 1985 ·	Bristol Open	· 1987 →

Eddie Edwards and Danie Visser were the defending champions, but Edwards did not participate this year. Visser partnered Christo Steyn.

Steyn and Visser won the title, defeating Mark Edmondson and Wally Masur 6–7, 7–6, 12–10 in the final.

== Seeds ==
1. (Australia) Mark Edmondson / (Australia) Wally Masur (final)
2. (United States) Mike Leach / (United States) Tim Wilkison (first round)
3. (South Africa) Christo Steyn / (South Africa) Danie Visser (champions)
4. (United Kingdom) Jeremy Bates / (Netherlands) Michiel Schapers (semifinals)

== Draw ==
=== Key ===
- Q = Qualifier
- WC = Wild card
- LL = Lucky loser
- Alt = Alternate
- ITF = ITF entry
- PR = Protected ranking
- SR = Special ranking
- SE = Special exempt
- JE = Junior exempt
- JR = Junior Accelerator Programme entrant
- CO = College Accelerator Programme entrant
- NG = Next Gen Accelerator Program entrant
- w/o = Walkover
- r = Retired
- d = Defaulted

=== Draw ===
First round
1	(Australia) M Edmondson (Australia) W Masur	6	6
(Brazil) N Aerts (Australia) M Woodforde	2	3
(Sweden) P Lundgren (Sweden) S Simonsson	7	3	6
(Chile) R Acuña (United States) M Davis	6	6	2
4	(United Kingdom) J Bates (Netherlands) M Schapers	4	6	10
(Australia) D Graham (United Kingdom) S Shaw	6	2	8
(Mexico) J Lozano (United States) T Witsken	4	6	12
(United States) B Schultz (United States) L Shiras	6	6	10
(United States) G Layendecker (Canada) G Michibata	6	6	11
(United States) CB Cox (Nigeria) N Odizor	3	7	9
(New Zealand) K Evernden (New Zealand) R Simpson	7	3	10
3	(South Africa) C Steyn (South Africa) D Visser	6	6	12
(United Kingdom) A Castle (United Kingdom) J Turner	7	7
(United States) C Dunk (United States) CB Strode	6	6
(Czechoslovakia) S Birner (Finland) O Rahnasto	7	7
2	(United States) M Leach (United States) T Wilkison	6	6

Quarterfinals
1	(Australia) M Edmondson (Australia) W Masur	6	6
(Sweden) P Lundgren (Sweden) S Simonsson	3	2
4	(United Kingdom) J Bates (Netherlands) M Schapers	6	3	9
(Mexico) J Lozano (United States) T Witsken	4	6	7
(United States) G Layendecker (Canada) G Michibata	1	6
3	(South Africa) C Steyn (South Africa) D Visser	6	7
(United Kingdom) A Castle (United Kingdom) J Turner	6	7
(Czechoslovakia) S Birner (Finland) O Rahnasto	3	6

Semifinals
1	(Australia) M Edmondson (Australia) W Masur	7	7
4	(United Kingdom) J Bates (Netherlands) M Schapers	6	5
3	(South Africa) C Steyn (South Africa) D Visser	6	6
(United Kingdom) A Castle (United Kingdom) J Turner	4	4

Final
1	(Australia) M Edmondson (Australia) W Masur	7	6	10
3	(South Africa) C Steyn (South Africa) D Visser	6	7	12
