= 1987 Bristol Trophy – Singles =

Singles
- 1987 Bristol Trophy

Final
- Champion: (New Zealand) Kelly Evernden
- Runner-up: (United States) Tim Wilkison
- Score: 6–4, 7–6

Details
- Draw: 48
- Seeds: 16

Events
Singles	Doubles
← 1986 ·	Bristol Trophy	· 1988 →

Vijay Amritraj was the defending champion, but lost in the third round this year.

Kelly Evernden won the title, defeating Tim Wilkison 6–4, 7–6 in the final.

== Seeds ==
1. (France) Henri Leconte (quarterfinals)
2. (India) Ramesh Krishnan (second round)
3. (Sweden) Jonas Svensson (third round)
4. (United States) Tim Wilkison (final)
5. (Australia) Peter Doohan (second round)
6. (South Africa) Danie Visser (second round)
7. (West Germany) Eric Jelen (semifinals)
8. (Netherlands) Michiel Schapers (semifinals)
9. (Peru) Jaime Yzaga (third round)
10. (South Africa) Christo Steyn (second round)
11. (South Africa) Eddie Edwards (quarterfinals)
12. (Nigeria) Nduka Odizor (second round)
13. (United States) Richard Matuszewski (second round)
14. (United States) Dan Goldie (second round)
15. (France) Éric Winogradsky (quarterfinals)
16. (Australia) Broderick Dyke (second round)

== Draw ==
=== Key ===
- Q = Qualifier
- WC = Wild card
- LL = Lucky loser
- Alt = Alternate
- ITF = ITF entry
- PR = Protected ranking
- SR = Special ranking
- SE = Special exempt
- JE = Junior exempt
- JR = Junior Accelerator Programme entrant
- CO = College Accelerator Programme entrant
- NG = Next Gen Accelerator Program entrant
- w/o = Walkover
- r = Retired
- d = Defaulted

=== Finals ===
Semifinals
8	(Netherlands) Michiel Schapers	6	4	8
4	(United States) Tim Wilkison	4	6	10
(New Zealand) Kelly Evernden	6	6	6
7	(West Germany) Eric Jelen	7	3	2

Final
4	(United States) Tim Wilkison	4	6
(New Zealand) Kelly Evernden	6	7

=== Top half ===
==== Section 1 ====
First round
WC	(United Kingdom) S Shaw	6	4	3
WC	(United Kingdom) C Bailey	2	6	6
(Mexico) A Moreno	6	0
(United Kingdom) A Castle	7	6
(Canada) G Michibata	2	2
(India) V Amritraj	6	6
(United States) J Sadri	5	5
(Mexico) E Vélez	7	7

Second round
1/WC	(France) H Leconte	7	6
WC	(United Kingdom) C Bailey	5	1
(United Kingdom) A Castle	7	6
16	(Australia) B Dyke	5	3
10	(South Africa) C Steyn	4	4
(India) V Amritraj	6	6
(Mexico) E Vélez	4	4
8	(Netherlands) M Schapers	6	6

Third round
1/WC	(France) H Leconte	6	7
(United Kingdom) A Castle	3	5
(India) V Amritraj	1	4
8	(Netherlands) M Schapers	6	6

Quarterfinals
1/WC	(France) H Leconte	6	7	5
8	(Netherlands) M Schapers	7	6	7

==== Section 2 ====
First round
(Mexico) J Lozano	3	6
(Brazil) R Acioly	6	7
Q	(Switzerland) Morees du Bruyn	2	6
(Australia) J Frawley	6	7
Q	(United States) B Testerman	6	3	6
(United States) J Lapidus	3	6	3
(United States) P Chamberlin	6	6
Q	(United States) Henry Somerville	1	2

Second round
4	(United States) T Wilkison	7	2	6
(Brazil) R Acioly	5	6	2
(Australia) J Frawley	6	6	9
13	(United States) R Matuszewski	4	7	7
12	(Nigeria) N Odizor	6	6
Q	(United States) B Testerman	7	7
(United States) P Chamberlin	6	6	6
5	(Australia) P Doohan	7	3	4

Third round
4	(United States) T Wilkison	6
(Australia) J Frawley	1	r
Q	(United States) B Testerman	7	6
(United States) P Chamberlin	6	3

Quarterfinals
4	(United States) T Wilkison	6	6	6
Q	(United States) B Testerman	7	2	2

=== Bottom half ===
==== Section 3 ====
First round
(United Kingdom) J Bates	6	6	6
(United States) M Kures	7	0	1
WC	(United Kingdom) J Turner	5	6	1
Q	(Australia) C Eagle	7	3	6
(United States) G Layendecker	4	2
(New Zealand) K Evernden	6	6
(West Germany) P Kühnen	7	6
Q	(Romania) M-I Năstase	5	4

Second round
6	(South Africa) D Visser	4	6
(United Kingdom) J Bates	6	7
Q	(Australia) C Eagle	6	6	2
11	(South Africa) E Edwards	7	4	6
14	(United States) D Goldie	2	2
(New Zealand) K Evernden	6	6
(West Germany) P Kühnen	3	4
3	(Sweden) J Svensson	6	6

Third round
(United Kingdom) J Bates	0	3
11	(South Africa) E Edwards	6	6
(New Zealand) K Evernden	3	6	6
3	(Sweden) J Svensson	6	3	3

Quarterfinals
11	(South Africa) E Edwards	6	3	4
(New Zealand) K Evernden	3	6	6

==== Section 4 ====
First round
(West Germany) P Moraing
(Canada) M Laurendeau	w/o
Q	(Sweden) C Bergström	6	6
(Denmark) M Tauson	4	0
(United States) K Jones	2	4
(United States) M Leach	6	6
(United States) J Klaparda	2	3
(West Germany) W Popp	6	6

Second round
7	(West Germany) E Jelen	6	7
(Canada) M Laurendeau	2	5
Q	(Sweden) C Bergström	6	3	2
9	(Peru) J Yzaga	3	6	6
15	(France) É Winogradsky	7	7
(United States) M Leach	5	5
(West Germany) W Popp	3	6	9
2	(India) R Krishnan	6	2	7

Third round
7	(West Germany) E Jelen	7	6
9	(Peru) J Yzaga	6	2
15	(France) É Winogradsky	7	6
(West Germany) W Popp	5	3

Quarterfinals
7	(West Germany) E Jelen	6	6
15	(France) É Winogradsky	4	4
