= 1986 Bristol Trophy – Singles =

Singles
- 1986 Bristol Trophy

Final
- Champion: (India) Vijay Amritraj
- Runner-up: (France) Henri Leconte
- Score: 7–6, 1–6, 8–6

Details
- Draw: 48
- Seeds: 16

Events
| Singles | Doubles |
| ← 1985 · | Bristol Open | · 1987 → |

Martin Davis was the defending champion, but lost in the third round this year.

Vijay Amritraj won the title, defeating Henri Leconte 7–6, 1–6, 8–6 in the final.

== Seeds ==
1. (France) Henri Leconte (final)
2. (United States) Tim Wilkison (quarterfinals)
3. (Czechoslovakia) Milan Šrejber (second round)
4. (Sweden) Peter Lundgren (second round)
5. (United States) Bud Schultz (semifinals)
6. (Canada) Glenn Michibata (second round)
7. (India) Ramesh Krishnan (third round)
8. (Netherlands) Michiel Schapers (quarterfinals)
9. (South Africa) Christo Steyn (third round)
10. (United States) Tom Gullikson (second round)
11. (United States) Martin Davis (third round)
12. (United States) John Sadri (third round)
13. (Chile) Ricardo Acuña (second round)
14. (Nigeria) Nduka Odizor (third round)
15. (United States) Mike Leach (third round)
16. (United States) Todd Witsken (second round)

== Draw ==
=== Key ===
- Q = Qualifier
- WC = Wild card
- LL = Lucky loser
- Alt = Alternate
- ITF = ITF entry
- PR = Protected ranking
- SR = Special ranking
- SE = Special exempt
- JE = Junior exempt
- JR = Junior Accelerator Programme entrant
- CO = College Accelerator Programme entrant
- NG = Next Gen Accelerator Program entrant
- w/o = Walkover
- r = Retired
- d = Defaulted

=== Finals ===
Semifinals
1/WC | (France) Henri Leconte | 6 | 6
5 | (United States) Bud Schultz | 3 | 0
(Australia) Mark Woodforde | 4 | 1
WC | (India) Vijay Amritraj | 6 | 6

Final
1/WC | (France) Henri Leconte | 6 | 6 | 6
WC | (India) Vijay Amritraj | 7 | 1 | 8

=== Top half ===
==== Section 1 ====
First round
(New Zealand) R Simpson | 6 | 2
(South Africa) D Visser | 7 | 6
WC | (United Kingdom) A Castle | 6 | 6
(Nigeria) T Mmoh | 4 | 3
(Sweden) S Simonsson | 3 | 7 | 3
(France) T Champion | 6 | 5 | 6
(United States) G Layendecker | 6 | 6 | 6
(New Zealand) K Evernden | 7 | 2 | 2

Second round
1/WC | (France) H Leconte | 6 | 3 | 6
(South Africa) D Visser | 4 | 6 | 1
WC | (United Kingdom) A Castle | 1 | 0^{r}
15 | (United States) M Leach | 6 | 1
9 | (South Africa) C Steyn | 7 | 4 | 6
(France) T Champion | 5 | 6 | 4
(United States) G Layendecker | 6 | 5
8 | (Netherlands) M Schapers | 7 | 7

Third round
1/WC | (France) H Leconte | 6 | 6
15 | (United States) M Leach | 3 | 4
9 | (South Africa) C Steyn | 6 | 4
8 | (Netherlands) M Schapers | 7 | 6

Quarterfinals
1/WC | (France) H Leconte | 6 | 4 | 6
8 | (Netherlands) M Schapers | 2 | 6 | 3

==== Section 2 ====
First round
(United Kingdom) J Bates | 7 | 6
(Australia) J Fitzgerald | 6 | 1
(Australia) S Youl | 3
(Australia) P Doohan | 0^{r}
(Australia) M Edmondson | 7 | 3 | 6
Q | (Mexico) J Lozano | 6 | 6 | 3
(United States) L Shiras | 7 | 6 | 11
Q | (West Germany) P Moraing | 6 | 7 | 13

Second round
3 | (Czechoslovakia) M Šrejber | 4 | 3
(United Kingdom) J Bates | 6 | 6
(Australia) S Youl | 7 | 4 | 6
13 | (Chile) R Acuña | 6 | 6 | 3
12 | (United States) J Sadri | 7 | 6
(Australia) M Edmondson | 6 | 2
Q | (West Germany) P Moraing | 4 | 1
5 | (United States) B Schultz | 6 | 6

Third round
(United Kingdom) J Bates | 4 | 6 | 6
(Australia) S Youl | 6 | 4 | 4
12 | (United States) J Sadri | 6 | 4 | 4
5 | (United States) B Schultz | 2 | 6 | 6

Quarterfinals
(United Kingdom) J Bates | 4 | 6 | 3
5 | (United States) B Schultz | 6 | 3 | 6

=== Bottom half ===
==== Section 3 ====
First round
(United States) B Green | 6 | 6
Q | (New Zealand) S Guy | 4 | 4
(Sweden) J Windahl | 4 | 3
(United States) V Wilder | 6 | 6
(Czechoslovakia) S Birner | 6 | 2
Q | (Finland) O Rahnasto | 7 | 6
Q | (United States) CB Cox | 6 | 3
(Australia) M Woodforde | 7 | 6

Second round
6 | (Canada) G Michibata | 6 | 6 | 11
(United States) B Green | 7 | 3 | 13
(United States) V Wilder | 3 | 3
11 | (United States) M Davis | 6 | 6
14 | (Nigeria) N Odizor | 7 | 4 | 9
Q | (Finland) O Rahnasto | 6 | 6 | 7
(Australia) M Woodforde | 6 | 7
4 | (Sweden) P Lundgren | 3 | 6

Third round
(United States) B Green | 6 | 7 | 13
11 | (United States) M Davis | 7 | 5 | 11
14 | (Nigeria) N Odizor | 4 | 6
(Australia) M Woodforde | 6 | 7

Quarterfinals
(United States) B Green | 6 | 4 | 3
(Australia) M Woodforde | 3 | 6 | 6

==== Section 4 ====
First round
(Australia) W Masur | 6 | 6
(South Africa) B Moir | 4 | 4
WC | (India) V Amritraj | 7 | 6
(Brazil) N Aerts | 6 | 2
(Australia) D Cahill | 7 | 5 | 6
(United States) D Rostagno | 6 | 7 | 4
Q | (United Kingdom) J Turner | 6 | 2 | 6
WC | (United Kingdom) S Shaw | 4 | 6 | 2

Second round
7 | (India) R Krishnan | 6 | 6
(Australia) W Masur | 2 | 3
WC | (India) V Amritraj | 6 | 5 | 6
10 | (United States) T Gullikson | 2 | 7 | 4
16 | (United States) T Witsken | 6 | 4
(Australia) D Cahill | 7 | 6
Q | (United Kingdom) J Turner | 6 | 1
2 | (United States) T Wilkison | 7 | 6

Third round
7 | (India) R Krishnan | 4 | 3
WC | (India) V Amritraj | 6 | 6
(Australia) D Cahill | 1 | 7 | 5
2 | (United States) T Wilkison | 6 | 6 | 7

Quarterfinals
WC | (India) V Amritraj | 6 | 6
2 | (United States) T Wilkison | 4 | 4
