= 1986 D.C. National Bank Classic – Singles =

Singles
- 1986 D.C. National Bank Classic

Final
- Champion: (Czechoslovakia) Karel Nováček
- Runner-up: (France) Thierry Tulasne
- Score: 6–1, 7–6^{(7–4)}

Details
- Draw: 56 (4WC/7Q/2LL)
- Seeds: 16

Events
Singles	Doubles
← 1985 ·	Washington Open	· 1987 →

Yannick Noah was the defending champion, but did not compete this year.

Karel Nováček won the title by defeating Thierry Tulasne 6–1, 7–6^{(7–4)} in the final.

== Seeds ==
The first eight seeds received a bye into the second round.

1. (Ecuador) Andrés Gómez (semifinals)
2. (France) Thierry Tulasne (final)
3. (Argentina) Martín Jaite (quarterfinals)
4. (Argentina) Guillermo Vilas (third round)
5. (United States) Jimmy Arias (semifinals)
6. (Sweden) Kent Carlsson (quarterfinals)
7. (Czechoslovakia) Milan Šrejber (second round)
8. (Uruguay) Diego Pérez (second round)
9. (United States) Aaron Krickstein (quarterfinals)
10. (Mexico) Francisco Maciel (second round)
11. (Czechoslovakia) Libor Pimek (second round)
12. (Argentina) Horacio de la Peña (third round)
13. (Peru) Jaime Yzaga (first round)
14. (Peru) Pablo Arraya (third round)
15. (Haiti) Ronald Agénor (third round)
16. (Spain) Fernando Luna (third round)

== Draw ==
=== Key ===
- Q = Qualifier
- WC = Wild card
- LL = Lucky loser
- Alt = Alternate
- SE = Special exempt
- PR = Protected ranking
- ITF = ITF entry
- JE = Junior exempt
- w/o = Walkover
- r = Retired
- d = Defaulted
- SR = Special ranking

=== Finals ===
Quarterfinals
1	(Ecuador) Andrés Gómez	6	6
9	(United States) Aaron Krickstein	4	1
(Czechoslovakia) Karel Nováček	6	6
6	(Sweden) Kent Carlsson	4	3
5	(United States) Jimmy Arias	3	7	6
3	(Argentina) Martín Jaite	6	6	3
(Sweden) Johan Carlsson	1	3
2	(France) Thierry Tulasne	6	6

Semifinals
1	(Ecuador) Andrés Gómez	6	6	4
(Czechoslovakia) Karel Nováček	7	1	6
5	(United States) Jimmy Arias	5	0
2	(France) Thierry Tulasne	7	6

Final
(Czechoslovakia) Karel Nováček	6	7^{7}
2	(France) Thierry Tulasne	1	6^{4}

=== Top half ===
==== Section 1 ====
First round
WC	(United States) D Goldie	6	7
WC	(United States) R Reneberg	3	6
(Romania) F Segărceanu	6	6	6
(United States) B Willenborg	1	7	2
(Argentina) R Argüello	1	3
16	(Spain) F Luna	6	6
9	(United States) A Krickstein	6	3	7
(Peru) C di Laura	2	6	5
Q	(Canada) Sznajder	7	6
(Nigeria) N Mmoh	6	4
(Sweden) J Windahl	4	3
(Socialist Federal Republic of Yugoslavia) M Ostoja	6	6

Second round
1	(Ecuador) A Gómez	6	6
WC	(United States) D Goldie	3	3
(Romania) F Segărceanu	6	4
16	(Spain) F Luna	7	6
9	(United States) A Krickstein	6	6
Q	(Canada) Sznajder	3	4
(Socialist Federal Republic of Yugoslavia) M Ostoja	4	7	7
7	(Czechoslovakia) M Šrejber	6	6	6

Third round
1	(Ecuador) A Gómez	6	7	6
16	(Spain) F Luna	7	6	2
9	(United States) A Krickstein	6	3	7
(Socialist Federal Republic of Yugoslavia) M Ostoja	3	6	6

Quarterfinals
1	(Ecuador) A Gómez	6	6
9	(United States) A Krickstein	4	1

==== Section 2 ====
First round
(Sweden) H Sundström	7	6
(South Africa) G Muller	6	2
LL	(United States) R Rudeen	6	4	3
(Italy) F Cancellotti	2	6	6
(Czechoslovakia) K Nováček	6	6
13	(Peru) J Yzaga	3	4
11	(Czechoslovakia) L Pimek	6	1	6
(Sweden) S Eriksson	3	6	1
Q	(Spain) J Arrese	6	6
Q	(United States) R Brown	4	3
WC	(United States) J Berger	6	7
Q	(United States) P McEnroe	3	5

Second round
4	(Argentina) G Vilas	6	6
(Sweden) H Sundström	4	2
(Italy) F Cancellotti	3	2
(Czechoslovakia) K Nováček	6	6
11	(Czechoslovakia) L Pimek	6	5	2
Q	(Spain) J Arrese	3	7	6
WC	(United States) J Berger	1	2
6	(Sweden) K Carlsson	6	6

Third round
4	(Argentina) G Vilas	5	6	1
(Czechoslovakia) K Nováček	7	4	6
Q	(Spain) J Arrese	2	1
6	(Sweden) K Carlsson	6	6

Quarterfinals
(Czechoslovakia) K Nováček	6	6
6	(Sweden) K Carlsson	4	3

=== Bottom half ===
==== Section 3 ====
First round
(Canada) M Wostenholme	7	6
Q	(Italy) G Pozzi	5	1
(Chile) H Gildemeister	6	0
(United States) L Duncan	7	6
(United States) J Brown	4	2
12	(Argentina) H de la Peña	6	6
14	(Peru) P Arraya	6	6
(United States) J Levine	4	0
(South Africa) C Steyn	6	3	6
(United States) M Purcell	4	6	4
(Brazil) C Kist	3	7	6
Q	(United States) R Leach	6	6	4

Second round
5	(United States) J Arias	7	6
(Canada) M Wostenholme	6	1
(United States) L Duncan	4	1
12	(Argentina) H de la Peña	6	6
14	(Peru) P Arraya	6	4
(South Africa) C Steyn	4	3^{r}
(Brazil) C Kist	2	3
3	(Argentina) M Jaite	6	6

Third round
5	(United States) J Arias	7	7
12	(Argentina) H de la Peña	6	5
14	(Peru) P Arraya	5	3
3	(Argentina) M Jaite	7	6

Quarterfinals
5	(United States) J Arias	3	7	6
3	(Argentina) M Jaite	6	6	3

==== Section 4 ====
First round
(South Africa) M Robertson	1	4
(Sweden) J Carlsson	6	6
(United States) M Davis	6	6
LL	(United States) M Buckley	2	1
(Argentina) M Ingaramo	7	4	2
10	(Mexico) F Maciel	6	6	6
15	(Haiti) R Agénor	6	6
(West Germany) H Schwaier	2	4
(South Africa) B Moir	7	6
WC	(Mexico) E Vélez	5	2
(United States) H Solomon	6	6
Q	(United States) N Schellenger	3	3

Second round
8	(Uruguay) D Pérez	6	4^{r}
(Sweden) J Carlsson	4	5
(United States) M Davis	3	7	7
10	(Mexico) F Maciel	6	5	6
15	(Haiti) R Agénor	6	6
(South Africa) B Moir	2	4
(United States) H Solomon	6	3	1
2	(France) T Tulasne	4	6	6

Third round
(Sweden) J Carlsson	1	6	6
(United States) M Davis	6	4	1
15	(Haiti) R Agénor	6	4	5
2	(France) T Tulasne	4	6	7

Quarterfinals
(Sweden) J Carlsson	1	3
2	(France) T Tulasne	6	6
