= 1986 D.C. National Bank Classic – Doubles =

Doubles
- 1986 D.C. National Bank Classic

Final
- Champions: (Chile) Hans Gildemeister (Ecuador) Andrés Gómez
- Runners-up: (Brazil) Ricardo Acioly (Brazil) César Kist
- Score: 6–3, 7–5

Details
- Draw: 28
- Seeds: 8

Events
| Singles | Doubles |
| ← 1985 · | Washington Open | · 1987 → |

Hans Gildemeister and Víctor Pecci were the defending champions, but Pecci did not compete this year.

Gildemeister teamed up with Andrés Gómez and successfully defended his title, by defeating Ricardo Acioly and César Kist 6–3, 7–5 in the final.

== Seeds ==
The first four seeds received a bye into the second round.

1. (Chile) Hans Gildemeister / (Ecuador) Andrés Gómez (champions)
2. (United States) Gary Donnelly / (United States) Robert Seguso (quarterfinals)
3. (South Africa) Michael Robertson / (United States) Tomm Warneke (quarterfinals)
4. (United States) Jon Levine / (South Africa) Christo Steyn (quarterfinals)
5. (United States) Jimmy Arias / (United States) Blaine Willenborg (second round)
6. (United States) Martin Davis / (United States) Bud Schultz (first round)
7. (Haiti) Ronald Agénor / (Socialist Federal Republic of Yugoslavia) Marko Ostoja (second round)
8. (Sweden) Johan Carlsson / (Sweden) Stefan Eriksson (first round)

== Draw ==
=== Key ===
- Q = Qualifier
- WC = Wild card
- LL = Lucky loser
- Alt = Alternate
- SE = Special exempt
- PR = Protected ranking
- ITF = ITF entry
- JE = Junior exempt
- w/o = Walkover
- r = Retired
- d = Defaulted
- SR = Special ranking

=== Finals ===
Semifinals
1 | (Chile) Hans Gildemeister (Ecuador) Andrés Gómez | 1 | 6 | 6
(United States) Dan Cassidy (United States) Mel Purcell | 6 | 4 | 3
WC | (Czechoslovakia) Libor Pimek (Czechoslovakia) Milan Šrejber | 6 | 6 | 3
(Brazil) Ricardo Acioly (Brazil) César Kist | 7 | 4 | 6

Final
1 | (Chile) Hans Gildemeister (Ecuador) Andrés Gómez | 6 | 7
(Brazil) Ricardo Acioly (Brazil) César Kist | 3 | 5

=== Top half ===
First round
WC | (United States) J Berger (United States) R Reneberg | 6 | 3 | 6
(South Africa) G Muller (United States) T Nelson | 2 | 6 | 2
(Mexico) J Lozano (United States) P McEnroe | 7 | 4 | 6
(Czechoslovakia) K Nováček (Romania) F Segărceanu | 6 | 6 | 0
(Peru) C di Laura (Peru) J Yzaga | 2 | 3
7 | (Haiti) R Agénor (Socialist Federal Republic of Yugoslavia) M Ostoja | 6 | 6
(United States) R Brown (United States) E Erck | 6 | 5 | 6
(United States) B Buffington (Australia) A Lane | 4 | 7 | 4
(United States) D Cassidy (United States) M Purcell | 3 | 6 | 6
(United States) B Dickinson (United States) J Lapidus | 6 | 3 | 4
LL | (United States) Seth Bowen (Canada) A Sznajder | 6 | 6 | 3
5 | (United States) J Arias (United States) B Willenborg | 3 | 7 | 6

Second round
1 | (Chile) H Gildemeister (Ecuador) A Gómez | 3 | 6 | 6
WC | (United States) J Berger (United States) R Reneberg | 6 | 3 | 4
(Mexico) J Lozano (United States) P McEnroe | 6 | 6
7 | (Haiti) R Agénor (Socialist Federal Republic of Yugoslavia) M Ostoja | 1 | 2
3 | (South Africa) M Robertson (United States) T Warneke | 6 | 6
(United States) R Brown (United States) E Erck | 2 | 4
(United States) D Cassidy (United States) M Purcell | 7 | 6
5 | (United States) J Arias (United States) B Willenborg | 6 | 3

Quarterfinals
1 | (Chile) H Gildemeister (Ecuador) A Gómez | w | / | o
(Mexico) J Lozano (United States) P McEnroe
3 | (South Africa) M Robertson (United States) T Warneke | 6 | 6 | 6
(United States) D Cassidy (United States) M Purcell | 3 | 7 | 7

Semifinals
1 | (Chile) H Gildemeister (Ecuador) A Gómez | 1 | 6 | 6
(United States) D Cassidy (United States) M Purcell | 6 | 4 | 3

=== Bottom half ===
First round
6 | (United States) M Davis (United States) B Schultz | 5 | 6 | 2
WC | (Czechoslovakia) L Pimek (Czechoslovakia) M Šrejber | 7 | 4 | 6
(United States) K Richter (United States) R Rudeen | 2 | 6 | 6
(United States) R Baxter (United States) J Ross | 6 | 3 | 7
(Nigeria) T Mmoh (United States) R Nixon | 6 | 6
(United States) R Leach (United States) S Stewart | 4 | 4
8 | (Sweden) J Carlsson (Sweden) S Eriksson | 4 | 7 | 2
(Brazil) R Acioly (Brazil) C Kist | 6 | 6 | 6
(South Africa) B Moir (Sweden) J Windahl | 6 | 6
(India) A Amritraj (United States) B Nealon | 4 | 3
WC | (United States) D Goldie (United States) K Jones | 6 | 7
(Peru) P Arraya (Ecuador) R Viver | 4 | 5

Second round
WC | (Czechoslovakia) L Pimek (Czechoslovakia) M Šrejber | 6 | 7
(United States) R Baxter (United States) J Ross | 3 | 6
(Nigeria) T Mmoh (United States) R Nixon | 6 | 6 | 1
4 | (United States) J Levine (South Africa) C Steyn | 7 | 4 | 6
(Brazil) R Acioly (Brazil) C Kist | 7 | 6
(South Africa) B Moir (Sweden) J Windahl | 6 | 2
WC | (United States) D Goldie (United States) K Jones | 2 | 6 | 2
2 | (United States) G Donnelly (United States) R Seguso | 6 | 0 | 6

Quarterfinals
WC | (Czechoslovakia) L Pimek (Czechoslovakia) M Šrejber | 7 | 6
4 | (United States) J Levine (South Africa) C Steyn | 6 | 0
(Brazil) R Acioly (Brazil) C Kist | 6 | 6 | 6
2 | (United States) G Donnelly (United States) R Seguso | 7 | 3 | 4

Semifinals
WC | (Czechoslovakia) L Pimek (Czechoslovakia) M Šrejber | 6 | 6 | 3
(Brazil) R Acioly (Brazil) C Kist | 7 | 4 | 6
