= 1985 West of England Championships – Doubles =

Doubles
- 1985 West of England Championships

Final
- Champions: (South Africa) Eddie Edwards (South Africa) Danie Visser
- Runners-up: (Australia) John Alexander (New Zealand) Russell Simpson
- Score: 6–4, 7–6

Details
- Draw: 16
- Seeds: 4

Events
Singles	Doubles
← 1984 ·	West of England Championships	· 1986 →

Larry Stefanki and Robert Van't Hof were the defending champions, but Van't Hof did not participate this year. Stefanki partnered Mike Bauer, losing in the quarterfinals.

Eddie Edwards and Danie Visser won the title, defeating John Alexander and Russell Simpson 6–4, 7–6 in the final.

== Seeds ==
1. (Australia) Peter Doohan / (Australia) Michael Fancutt (first round)
2. (Australia) Brad Drewett / (Australia) Mark Edmondson (semifinals)
3. (France) Henri Leconte / (United States) Tim Wilkison (first round)
4. (Brazil) Givaldo Barbosa / (Brazil) Ivan Kley (first round)

== Draw ==
=== Key ===
- Q = Qualifier
- WC = Wild card
- LL = Lucky loser
- Alt = Alternate
- ITF = ITF entry
- PR = Protected ranking
- SR = Special ranking
- SE = Special exempt
- JE = Junior exempt
- JR = Junior Accelerator Programme entrant
- CO = College Accelerator Programme entrant
- NG = Next Gen Accelerator Program entrant
- w/o = Walkover
- r = Retired
- d = Defaulted

=== Draw ===
First round
1	(Australia) P Doohan (Australia) M Fancutt	3	6
(United States) Ti Gullikson (United States) To Gullikson	6	7
(United States) S Meister (United States) B Teacher	6	6	6
(Australia) D Graham (Nigeria) N Odizor	7	4	4
3	(France) H Leconte (United States) T Wilkison	6	3
(United States) D Cassidy (United States) G Layendecker	7	6
(South Africa) E Edwards (South Africa) D Visser	7	6
(United States) M Davis (United States) L Shiras	6	4
(Australia) J Alexander (New Zealand) R Simpson	6	5	6
(United Kingdom) J Bates (United Kingdom) S Shaw	3	7	4
(Switzerland) J Hlasek (West Germany) W Popp	4	6	6
4	(Brazil) G Barbosa (Brazil) I Kley	6	1	4
(United States) M Bauer (United States) L Stefanki	6	3	6
(United States) M Flur (United States) S McCain	3	6	3
(United States) T Moor (United States) H Pfister	4	4
2	(Australia) B Drewett (Australia) M Edmondson	6	6

Quarterfinals
(United States) Ti Gullikson (United States) To Gullikson	7	3	6
(United States) S Meister (United States) B Teacher	6	6	3
(United States) D Cassidy (United States) G Layendecker	4	7	3
(South Africa) E Edwards (South Africa) D Visser	6	6	6
(Australia) J Alexander (New Zealand) R Simpson	7	6
(Switzerland) J Hlasek (West Germany) W Popp	6	4
(United States) M Bauer (United States) L Stefanki	1	1
2	(Australia) B Drewett (Australia) M Edmondson	6	6

Semifinals
(United States) Ti Gullikson (United States) To Gullikson	3	6	5
(South Africa) E Edwards (South Africa) D Visser	6	3	7
(Australia) J Alexander (New Zealand) R Simpson	6	1	6
2	(Australia) B Drewett (Australia) M Edmondson	3	6	3

Final
(South Africa) E Edwards (South Africa) D Visser	6	7
(Australia) J Alexander (New Zealand) R Simpson	4	6
