= 1987 Sovran Bank D.C. National Tennis Classic – Doubles =

Doubles
- 1987 Sovran Bank D.C. National Tennis Classic

Final
- Champions: (United States) Gary Donnelly (United States) Peter Fleming
- Runners-up: (Australia) Laurie Warder (United States) Blaine Willenborg
- Score: 6–2, 7–6

Details
- Draw: 28 (3WC)
- Seeds: 8

Events
Singles	Doubles
- Washington Open

Hans Gildemeister and Andrés Gómez were the defending champions, but both players decided to rest after competing in the Davis Cup the previous week.

Gary Donnelly and Peter Fleming won the title by defeating Laurie Warder and Blaine Willenborg 6–2, 7–6 in the final.

== Seeds ==
The first four seeds received a bye to the second round.

1. (United States) Paul Annacone / (South Africa) Christo van Rensburg (semifinals)
2. (United States) Gary Donnelly / (United States) Peter Fleming (champions)
3. (Australia) Laurie Warder / (United States) Blaine Willenborg (final)
4. (United States) Ken Flach / (South Africa) Christo Steyn (second round)
5. (United States) Chip Hooper / (South Africa) Gary Muller (quarterfinals)
6. (United States) Brad Pearce / (United States) Jim Pugh (quarterfinals)
7. (United States) Kelly Jones / (United States) Tim Pawsat (quarterfinals)
8. (United States) Rill Baxter / (United States) Joey Rive (second round)

== Draw ==
Key

- Q = Qualifier
- WC = Wild card
- LL = Lucky loser
- Alt = Alternate
- ITF = ITF entry
- PR = Protected ranking
- SR = Special ranking
- SE = Special exempt
- JE = Junior exempt
- JR = Junior Accelerator Programme entrant
- CO = College Accelerator Programme entrant
- NG = Next Gen Accelerator Program entrant
- w/o = Walkover
- r = Retired
- d = Defaulted

=== Finals ===
Semifinals
1	(United States) Paul Annacone (South Africa) Christo van Rensburg	2	6	6
3	(Australia) Laurie Warder (United States) Blaine Willenborg	6	2	7
(United States) Steve Denton (United States) Sammy Giammalva Jr.	6	6	6
2	(United States) Gary Donnelly (United States) Peter Fleming	7	3	7

Final
3	(Australia) Laurie Warder (United States) Blaine Willenborg	2	6
2	(United States) Gary Donnelly (United States) Peter Fleming	6	7

=== Top half ===
First round
(United States) D Goldie (United States) L Scott	7	2	7
(United States) A Agassi (United States) J Arias	6	6	5
(United States) M Davis (Australia) B Drewett	7	6
(United States) D MacBride (South Africa) B Moir	6	4
(United States) J Brown (United States) R Brown	4	0
7	(United States) K Jones (United States) T Pawsat	6	6
WC	(United States) J Berger (United States) R Matuszewski	2	6
WC	(United States) D Wheaton (Peru) J Yzaga	6	7
(Czechoslovakia) I Lendl (United States) B Scanlon	6	6
(South Africa) M Robertson (United States) T Witsken	4	4
(United States) J Kriek (United States) B Testerman	4	3
5	(United States) C Hooper (South Africa) G Muller	6	6

Second round
1	(United States) P Annacone (South Africa) C van Rensburg	6	6
(United States) D Goldie (United States) L Scott	3	2
(United States) M Davis (Australia) B Drewett	6	6	4
7	(United States) K Jones (United States) T Pawsat	3	7	6
3	(Australia) L Warder (United States) B Willenborg	6	6
WC	(United States) D Wheaton (Peru) J Yzaga	1	1
(Czechoslovakia) I Lendl (United States) B Scanlon
5	(United States) C Hooper (South Africa) G Muller	w/o

Quarterfinals
1	(United States) P Annacone (South Africa) C van Rensburg	4	7	6
7	(United States) K Jones (United States) T Pawsat	6	6	4
3	(Australia) L Warder (United States) B Willenborg	6	7	6
5	(United States) C Hooper (South Africa) G Muller	7	5	4

Semifinals
1	(United States) P Annacone (South Africa) C van Rensburg	2	6	6
3	(Australia) L Warder (United States) B Willenborg	6	2	7

=== Bottom half ===
First round
6	(United States) B Pearce (United States) J Pugh	7	6
(Australia) D Graham (France) É Winogradsky	5	4
(Sweden) J Carlsson (Sweden) P Lundgren	3	6	7
(United States) B Cox (United States) J Levine	6	3	6
(United States) B Gilbert (United States) V Van Patten	5	3
(United States) S Denton (United States) S Giammalva Jr.	7	6
8	(United States) R Baxter (United States) J Rive	7	6
(United States) J Ross (United States) D Tarr	6	4
(Paraguay) F González (United States) T Warneke	6	6
WC	(United States) A Parker (United States) J Tarango	2	4
(Australia) M Kratzmann (Australia) S Youl	6	3	6
(United States) D Dowlen (Nigeria) N Odizor	4	6	3

Second round
6	(United States) B Pearce (United States) J Pugh	7	6
(Sweden) J Carlsson (Sweden) P Lundgren	5	3
(United States) S Denton (United States) S Giammalva Jr.	6	6	6
4	(United States) K Flach (South Africa) C Steyn	7	4	1
8	(United States) R Baxter (United States) J Rive	1	5
(Paraguay) F González (United States) T Warneke	6	7
(Australia) M Kratzmann (Australia) S Youl	7	4	4
2	(United States) G Donnelly (United States) P Fleming	6	6	6

Quarterfinals
6	(United States) B Pearce (United States) J Pugh	3	4
(United States) S Denton (United States) S Giammalva Jr.	6	6
(Paraguay) F González (United States) T Warneke	6	6	6
2	(United States) G Donnelly (United States) P Fleming	7	3	7

Semifinals
(United States) S Denton (United States) S Giammalva Jr.	6	6	6
2	(United States) G Donnelly (United States) P Fleming	7	3	7
