= 1989 Bristol Trophy – Singles =

Singles
- 1989 Bristol Trophy

Final
- Champion: (West Germany) Eric Jelen
- Runner-up: (United Kingdom) Nick Brown
- Score: 6–4, 3–6, 7–5

Details
- Draw: 32
- Seeds: 8

Events
Singles	Doubles
← 1988 ·	Bristol Trophy

Christian Saceanu was the defending champion but lost in the second round to Brad Drewett.

Eric Jelen won in the final 6–4, 3–6, 7–5 against Nick Brown.

== Seeds ==
1. (United States) Derrick Rostagno (quarterfinals)
2. (United States) Richard Matuszewski (semifinals)
3. (Italy) Omar Camporese (first round)
4. (West Germany) Eric Jelen (champion)
5. (South Africa) Pieter Aldrich (second round)
6. (New Zealand) Kelly Evernden (quarterfinals)
7. (Netherlands) Michiel Schapers (semifinals)
8. (United States) Todd Witsken (first round)

== Draw ==
=== Key ===
- Q = Qualifier
- WC = Wild card
- LL = Lucky loser
- Alt = Alternate
- ITF = ITF entry
- PR = Protected ranking
- SR = Special ranking
- SE = Special exempt
- JE = Junior exempt
- JR = Junior Accelerator Programme entrant
- CO = College Accelerator Programme entrant
- NG = Next Gen Accelerator Program entrant
- w/o = Walkover
- r = Retired
- d = Defaulted

=== Finals ===
Semifinals
7	(Netherlands) Michiel Schapers	6	3	11
4	(West Germany) Eric Jelen	3	6	13
WC	(United Kingdom) Nick Brown	6	4	6
2	(United States) Richard Matuszewski	2	6	3

Final
4	(West Germany) Eric Jelen	6	3	7
WC	(United Kingdom) Nick Brown	4	6	5

=== Top half ===
First round
1	(United States) D Rostagno	6	6
(United States) T Wilkison	2	2
(United States) P Chamberlin	6	6
(United Kingdom) J Goodall	2	4
WC	(United Kingdom) C Bailey	6	3	3
(The Bahamas) R Smith	3	6	6
(United States) R Van't Hof	2	6	4
7	(Netherlands) M Schapers	6	3	6
4	(West Germany) E Jelen	7	6
Q	(United Kingdom) J Turner	6	3
(South Africa) G Muller	2	0^{r}
(South Africa) D Visser	6	1
WC	(United Kingdom) A Castle	6	6	4
(India) V Amritraj	4	7	6
(Venezuela) N Pereira	6	5	4
6	(New Zealand) K Evernden	3	7	6

Second round
1	(United States) D Rostagno	6	6
(United States) P Chamberlin	1	2
(The Bahamas) R Smith	6	1
7	(Netherlands) M Schapers	7	6
4	(West Germany) E Jelen	6	6
(South Africa) D Visser	4	4
(India) V Amritraj	2	4
6	(New Zealand) K Evernden	6	6

Quarterfinals
1	(United States) D Rostagno	4	2
7	(Netherlands) M Schapers	6	6
4	(West Germany) E Jelen	4	6	9
6	(New Zealand) K Evernden	6	4	7

Semifinals
7	(Netherlands) M Schapers	6	3	11
4	(West Germany) E Jelen	3	6	13

=== Bottom half ===
First round
5	(South Africa) P Aldrich	6	6
(Senegal) Y Doumbia	1	3
WC	(United Kingdom) N Brown	6	3	6
(Italy) G Pozzi	4	6	3
(West Germany) M Stich	6	6
Q	(United Kingdom) A Brice	3	2
(Portugal) N Marques	6	6
3	(Italy) O Camporese	3	2
8	(United States) T Witsken	6	4	3
(Australia) B Drewett	4	6	6
(West Germany) C Saceanu	6	7
Q	(Australia) N Borwick	3	5
(United States) D Wheaton	3	6	6
Q	(South Africa) W Green	6	3	4
(Nigeria) N Odizor	3	3
2	(United States) R Matuszewski	6	6

Second round
5	(South Africa) P Aldrich	3	5
WC	(United Kingdom) N Brown	6	7
(West Germany) M Stich	6	6
(Portugal) N Marques	3	2
(Australia) B Drewett	7	6
(West Germany) C Saceanu	6	2
(United States) D Wheaton	6	6
2	(United States) R Matuszewski	7	7

Quarterfinals
WC	(United Kingdom) N Brown	6	1
(West Germany) M Stich	4	0^{r}
(Australia) B Drewett	2	6
2	(United States) R Matuszewski	6	7

Semifinals
WC	(United Kingdom) N Brown	6	4	6
2	(United States) R Matuszewski	2	6	3
