= 1989 Bristol Trophy – Doubles =

Doubles
- 1989 Bristol Trophy

Final
- Champions: (United States) Paul Chamberlin (United States) Tim Wilkison
- Runners-up: (United States) Mike De Palmer (United States) Gary Donnelly
- Score: 7–6, 6–4

Events
Singles	Doubles
← 1988 ·	Bristol Trophy

Peter Doohan and Laurie Warder were the defending champions but did not compete that year.

Paul Chamberlin and Tim Wilkison won in the final 7–6, 6–4 against Mike De Palmer and Gary Donnelly.

== Seeds ==
1. (United Kingdom) Andrew Castle / (United States) Robert Van't Hof (quarterfinals)
2. (West Germany) Christian Saceanu / (Czechoslovakia) Milan Šrejber (semifinals)
3. (United Kingdom) Neil Broad / (South Africa) Eddie Edwards (first round)
4. (Brazil) Ricardo Acioly / (Brazil) Dacio Campos (first round)

== Draw ==
=== Key ===
- Q = Qualifier
- WC = Wild card
- LL = Lucky loser
- Alt = Alternate
- ITF = ITF entry
- PR = Protected ranking
- SR = Special ranking
- SE = Special exempt
- JE = Junior exempt
- JR = Junior Accelerator Programme entrant
- CO = College Accelerator Programme entrant
- NG = Next Gen Accelerator Program entrant
- w/o = Walkover
- r = Retired
- d = Defaulted

First round
1	(United Kingdom) A Castle (United States) R Van't Hof	7	6
(Italy) O Camporese (Italy) G Pozzi	6	3
(Nigeria) N Odizor (The Bahamas) R Smith	7	7
(South Africa) D Adams (United States) D Rostagno	6	6
4	(Brazil) R Acioly (Brazil) D Campos	3	1
(United States) P Chamberlin (United States) T Wilkison	6	6
(United Kingdom) J Goodall (United States) J Russell	2	3
(United States) S Cannon (United States) S DeVries	6	6
(Socialist Federal Republic of Yugoslavia) I Flego (United States) J Schor	6	6
(India) V Amritraj (United Kingdom) C Bailey	7	7
(United States) M De Palmer (United States) G Donnelly	7	6	6
3	(United Kingdom) N Broad (South Africa) E Edwards	5	7	4
(United States) R Matuszewski (United States) D Wheaton	6	3	6
(Senegal) Y Doumbia (Brazil) M Menezes	3	6	3
(Netherlands) M Schapers (West Germany) M Stich	6	6
2	(West Germany) C Saceanu (Czechoslovakia) M Šrejber	7	7

Quarterfinals
1	(United Kingdom) A Castle (United States) R Van't Hof
(Nigeria) N Odizor (The Bahamas) R Smith	w/o
(United States) P Chamberlin (United States) T Wilkison	6	6
(United States) S Cannon (United States) S DeVries	4	2
(India) V Amritraj (United Kingdom) C Bailey	1	6	3
(United States) M De Palmer (United States) G Donnelly	6	4	6
(United States) R Matuszewski (United States) D Wheaton	6	3	4
2	(West Germany) C Saceanu (Czechoslovakia) M Šrejber	3	6	6

Semifinals
(Nigeria) N Odizor (The Bahamas) R Smith	6	3	4
(United States) P Chamberlin (United States) T Wilkison	3	6	6
(United States) M De Palmer (United States) G Donnelly	6	6	8
2	(West Germany) C Saceanu (Czechoslovakia) M Šrejber	7	2	6

Final
(United States) P Chamberlin (United States) T Wilkison	7	6
(United States) M De Palmer (United States) G Donnelly	6	4
