= 1985 West of England Championships – Singles =

Singles
- 1985 West of England Championships

Final
- Champion: (United States) Martin Davis
- Runner-up: (United States) Glenn Layendecker
- Score: 4–6, 6–3, 7–5

Details
- Draw: 48
- Seeds: 16

Events
Singles	Doubles
← 1984 ·	West of England Championships	· 1986 →

Johan Kriek was the defending champion, but did not participate this year.

Martin Davis won the title, defeating Glenn Layendecker 4–6, 6–3, 7–5 in the final.

== Seeds ==
1. (France) Henri Leconte (third round)
2. (United States) Terry Moor (third round)
3. (United States) Tim Wilkison (third round)
4. (France) Guy Forget (quarterfinals)
5. (United States) Larry Stefanki (third round)
6. (United States) Brian Teacher (semifinals)
7. (United States) Bob Green (second round)
8. (United States) Martin Davis (champion)
9. (United States) Ken Flach (second round)
10. (France) Tarik Benhabiles (second round)
11. (United States) Hank Pfister (second round)
12. (United States) Leif Shiras (second round)
13. (United States) Jay Lapidus (second round)
14. (United States) Mike Bauer (second round)
15. (Australia) Peter Doohan (quarterfinals)
16. (United States) Marc Flur (third round)

== Draw ==
=== Key ===
- Q = Qualifier
- WC = Wild card
- LL = Lucky loser
- Alt = Alternate
- ITF = ITF entry
- PR = Protected ranking
- SR = Special ranking
- SE = Special exempt
- JE = Junior exempt
- JR = Junior Accelerator Programme entrant
- CO = College Accelerator Programme entrant
- NG = Next Gen Accelerator Program entrant
- w/o = Walkover
- r = Retired
- d = Defaulted

=== Finals ===
Semifinals
(United States) Roger Knapp	4	3
Q	(United States) Glenn Layendecker	6	6
6	(United States) Brian Teacher	3	6
8	(United States) Martin Davis	6	7

Final
Q	(United States) Glenn Layendecker	6	3	5
8	(United States) Martin Davis	4	6	7

=== Top half ===
==== Section 1 ====
First round
Q	(United States) C Hooper	6	2
WC	(Italy) G Ocleppo	7	6
(South Africa) D Visser	3	6
(United States) R Knapp	6	7
(Australia) B Derlin	6	4	4
(United States) L Bourne	4	6	6
Q	(West Germany) R Osterthun	5	2
(United States) To Gullikson	7	6

Second round
1	(France) H Leconte	6	6
WC	(Italy) G Ocleppo	3	2
(United States) R Knapp	6	6	6
14	(United States) M Bauer	7	2	2
15	(Australia) P Doohan	6	7
(United States) L Bourne	1	6
(United States) To Gullikson	6	5	4
5	(United States) L Stefanki	3	7	6

Third round
1	(France) H Leconte	4	2
(United States) R Knapp	6	6
15	(Australia) P Doohan	7	6
5	(United States) L Stefanki	6	2

Quarterfinals
(United States) R Knapp	7	3	6
15	(Australia) P Doohan	6	6	3

==== Section 2 ====
First round
WC	(United Kingdom) S Bale	2	3
(West Germany) W Popp	6	6
(Nigeria) N Odizor	4	6	6
Q	(Brazil) D Campos	6	3	4
(South Africa) E Edwards	6	6	7
Q	(United States) G Layendecker	7	1	9
(Australia) M Edmondson	6	6	4
(United States) B Schultz	4	7	6

Second round
3	(United States) T Wilkison	6	6
(West Germany) W Popp	4	2
(Nigeria) N Odizor	6	7
12	(United States) L Shiras	2	6
10	(France) T Benhabiles	5	6	3
Q	(United States) G Layendecker	7	3	6
(United States) B Schultz	6	7	6
7	(United States) B Green	7	6	4

Third round
3	(United States) T Wilkison	4	4
(Nigeria) N Odizor	6	6
Q	(United States) G Layendecker	6	6
(United States) B Schultz	3	3

Quarterfinals
(Nigeria) N Odizor	3	4
Q	(United States) G Layendecker	6	6

=== Bottom half ===
==== Section 3 ====
First round
(United States) T Nelson	1	6	6
(New Zealand) R Simpson	6	4	3
Q	(Australia) P Johnston	3	4
(Australia) B Drewett	6	6
(United States) Ti Gullikson	2	7	6
(Socialist Federal Republic of Yugoslavia) S Živojinović	6	6	4
(United States) S Meister	6	6
(United States) D Cassidy	1	1

Second round
6	(United States) B Teacher	6	3	6
(United States) T Nelson	4	6	3
(Australia) B Drewett	3	5
16	(United States) M Flur	6	7
13	(United States) J Lapidus	5	0
(United States) Ti Gullikson	7	6
(United States) S Meister	6	1
4/WC	(France) G Forget	7	6

Third round
6	(United States) B Teacher	5	7	6
16	(United States) M Flur	7	6	4
(United States) Ti Gullikson	2	3
4/WC	(France) G Forget	6	6

Quarterfinals
6	(United States) B Teacher	2	7	6
4/WC	(France) G Forget	6	6	4

==== Section 4 ====
First round
(Australia) W Masur	6	3	12
(Brazil) I Kley	3	6	10
(Australia) J Frawley	4	7	6
(Brazil) G Barbosa	6	5	3
WC	(United Kingdom) J Bates	6	6
(United States) S McCain	3	4
(Netherlands) H van Boeckel	6	6
(United Kingdom) S Shaw	3	2

Second round
8	(United States) M Davis	7	5	7
(Australia) W Masur	5	7	5
(Australia) J Frawley	1	7	6
11	(United States) H Pfister	6	6	3
9	(United States) K Flach	3	2
WC	(United Kingdom) J Bates	6	6
(Netherlands) H van Boeckel	2	6
2	(United States) T Moor	6	7

Third round
8	(United States) M Davis	6	6
(Australia) J Frawley	3	4
WC	(United Kingdom) J Bates	6	5	6
2	(United States) T Moor	4	7	4

Quarterfinals
8	(United States) M Davis	4	7	9
WC	(United Kingdom) J Bates	6	5	7
