= 1989 Livingston Open – Doubles =

Doubles
- 1989 Livingston Open

Final
- Champions: (United States) Tim Pawsat (United States) Tim Wilkison
- Runners-up: (New Zealand) Kelly Evernden (United States) Sammy Giammalva Jr.
- Score: 7–5, 6–3

Details
- Draw: 16
- Seeds: 4

Events
Singles	Doubles
- Livingston Open

Grant Connell and Glenn Michibata were the defending champions, but did not participate this year.

Tim Pawsat and Tim Wilkison won the title, defeating Kelly Evernden and Sammy Giammalva Jr. 7–5, 6–3 in the final.

== Seeds ==
1. (United States) Tim Pawsat / (United States) Tim Wilkison (champions)
2. (New Zealand) Kelly Evernden / (United States) Sammy Giammalva Jr. (final)
3. (Austria) Alex Antonitsch / (United States) Jonathan Canter (semifinals)
4. (United States) Mark Ozer / (Italy) Gianluca Pozzi (quarterfinals)

== Draw ==
Key

- Q = Qualifier
- WC = Wild card
- LL = Lucky loser
- Alt = Alternate
- ITF = ITF entry
- PR = Protected ranking
- SR = Special ranking
- SE = Special exempt
- JE = Junior exempt
- JR = Junior Accelerator Programme entrant
- CO = College Accelerator Programme entrant
- NG = Next Gen Accelerator Program entrant
- w/o = Walkover
- r = Retired
- d = Defaulted

=== Draw ===
First round
1	(United States) T Pawsat (United States) T Wilkison	6	3	6
(Australia) R Fromberg (Australia) J Stoltenberg	4	6	3
(United States) M Brown (United States) A Parker	6	6
(Puerto Rico) M Nido (United States) J Tarango	3	2
4	(United States) M Ozer (Italy) G Pozzi	4	6	7
(United States) Rozzell Lightfoot (Ivory Coast) C N'Goran	6	4	5
(Canada) M Laurendeau (United States) S Warner	7	3	6
(United Kingdom) C Bailey (United States) J Klaparda	6	6	4
(United Kingdom) U Nganga (France) P Pech	4	6	7
(United States) F Hunt (United States) Mark Jacobson	6	3	6
(United States) Mike Conroy (United States) P Fishbach	3	3
3	(Austria) A Antonitsch (United States) J Canter	6	6
(United States) C Garner (The Bahamas) M Knowles	4	6
(India) A Amritraj (Nigeria) N Odizor	6	7
(India) R Krishnan (United States) J Ross	4	1
2	(New Zealand) K Evernden (United States) S Giammalva Jr.	6	6

Quarterfinals
1	(United States) T Pawsat (United States) T Wilkison	6	3	7
(United States) M Brown (United States) A Parker	3	6	6
4	(United States) M Ozer (Italy) G Pozzi	4	4
(Canada) M Laurendeau (United States) S Warner	6	6
(United Kingdom) U Nganga (France) P Pech	4	4
3	(Austria) A Antonitsch (United States) J Canter	6	6
(India) A Amritraj (Nigeria) N Odizor	3	6	3
2	(New Zealand) K Evernden (United States) S Giammalva Jr.	6	3	6

Semifinals
1	(United States) T Pawsat (United States) T Wilkison	6	7
(Canada) M Laurendeau (United States) S Warner	4	6
3	(Austria) A Antonitsch (United States) J Canter	3	6	3
2	(New Zealand) K Evernden (United States) S Giammalva Jr.	6	3	6

Final
1	(United States) T Pawsat (United States) T Wilkison	7	6
2	(New Zealand) K Evernden (United States) S Giammalva Jr.	5	3
