= 1987 Sovran Bank D.C. National Tennis Classic – Singles =

Singles
- 1987 Sovran Bank D.C. National Tennis Classic

Final
- Champion: (Czechoslovakia) Ivan Lendl
- Runner-up: (United States) Brad Gilbert
- Score: 6–1, 6–0

Details
- Draw: 56 (5WC/7Q/1LL)
- Seeds: 16

Events
Singles	Doubles
- Washington Open

Karel Nováček was the defending champion, but chose to compete at Hilversum during the same week.

Ivan Lendl won the title by defeating Brad Gilbert 6–1, 6–0 in the final.

== Seeds ==
The first eight seeds received a bye to the second round.

1. (Czechoslovakia) Ivan Lendl (champion)
2. (West Germany) Boris Becker (semifinals)
3. (United States) Jimmy Connors (semifinals)
4. (United States) Brad Gilbert (final)
5. (United States) Johan Kriek (third round)
6. (n/a)
7. (United States) Jimmy Arias (quarterfinals)
8. (United States) Jay Berger (quarterfinals)
9. (United States) Dan Goldie (first round)
10. (United States) Andre Agassi (first round)
11. (Peru) Jaime Yzaga (first round)
12. (United States) Todd Witsken (quarterfinals)
13. (Nigeria) Nduka Odizor (third round)
14. (United States) Jim Pugh (third round)
15. (Sweden) Johan Carlsson (first round)
16. (United States) Peter Fleming (first round)

== Draw ==
Key

- Q = Qualifier
- WC = Wild card
- LL = Lucky loser
- Alt = Alternate
- ITF = ITF entry
- PR = Protected ranking
- SR = Special ranking
- SE = Special exempt
- JE = Junior exempt
- JR = Junior Accelerator Programme entrant
- CO = College Accelerator Programme entrant
- NG = Next Gen Accelerator Program entrant
- w/o = Walkover
- r = Retired
- d = Defaulted

=== Finals ===
Quarterfinals
1	(Czechoslovakia) Ivan Lendl	6	4	6
7	(United States) Jimmy Arias	3	6	4
3	(United States) Jimmy Connors	6	2	6
12	(United States) Todd Witsken	3	6	2
(United States) Martin Davis	4	4
4	(United States) Brad Gilbert	6	6
8	(United States) Jay Berger	3	2
2/WC	(West Germany) Boris Becker	6	6

Semifinals
1	(Czechoslovakia) Ivan Lendl	6	7
3	(United States) Jimmy Connors	4	6
4	(United States) Brad Gilbert	3	6	6
2/WC	(West Germany) Boris Becker	6	3	0

Final
1	(Czechoslovakia) Ivan Lendl	6	6
4	(United States) Brad Gilbert	1	0

=== Top half ===
==== Section 1 ====
First round
(United States) B Pearce	6	7
Q	(South Africa) M Robertson	3	5
(Sweden) T Högstedt	1	7	2
Q	(United States) J Levine	6	6	6
WC	(United States) D Wheaton	6	6
15	(Sweden) J Carlsson	1	3
10	(United States) A Agassi	4	6	0
(West Germany) P Kühnen	6	4	6
(United States) J Brown	7	4	5
(Australia) S Youl	6	6	7
(United States) M Kures	6	3	6
(West Germany) C Saceanu	3	6	1

Second round
1	(Czechoslovakia) I Lendl	7	6
(United States) B Pearce	6	3
Q	(United States) J Levine	6	3	2
WC	(United States) D Wheaton	4	6	6
(West Germany) P Kühnen	6	6	3
(Australia) S Youl	7	4	6
(United States) M Kures	5	2
7	(United States) J Arias	7	6

Third round
1	(Czechoslovakia) I Lendl	6	6	6
WC	(United States) D Wheaton	7	3	2
(Australia) S Youl	6	3
7	(United States) J Arias	7	6

Quarterfinals
1	(Czechoslovakia) I Lendl	6	4	6
7	(United States) J Arias	3	6	4

==== Section 2 ====
First round
(West Germany) P Moraing	2	3
(United States) K Jones	6	6
(Sweden) P Lundgren	5	1
(West Germany) M Westphal	7	6
Q	(United States) D Tarr	2	1
14	(United States) J Pugh	6	6
12	(United States) T Witsken	6	6
(United States) K Flach	2	1
(United States) B Testerman	6	6
(Australia) B Drewett	7	7
(France) É Winogradsky	6	4	5
Q	(Australia) L Warder	4	6	7

Second round
3	(United States) J Connors	6	6
(United States) K Jones	3	1
(West Germany) M Westphal	2	4
14	(United States) J Pugh	6	6
12	(United States) T Witsken	6	7
(Australia) B Drewett	3	6
Q	(Australia) L Warder	6	6
LL	(Australia) C Miller	4	4

Third round
3	(United States) J Connors	6	6
14	(United States) J Pugh	3	1
12	(United States) T Witsken	6	6
Q	(Australia) L Warder	0	1

Quarterfinals
3	(United States) J Connors	6	2	6
12	(United States) T Witsken	3	6	2

=== Bottom half ===
==== Section 3 ====
First round
(Nigeria) T Mmoh	2	0^{r}
Q	(United States) J Tarango	6	3
(United States) M Davis	6	6
(South Africa) G Muller	2	0
(United States) B Scanlon	6	0	6
11	(Peru) J Yzaga	3	6	0
13	(Nigeria) N Odizor	6	6
(United States) G Donnelly	2	3
(Canada) S Bonneau	6	6
Q	(United States) T Warneke	4	2
(Canada) M Laurendeau	2	4
(United States) C Hooper	6	6

Second round
5	(United States) J Kriek	7	6
Q	(United States) J Tarango	6	4
(United States) M Davis	6	4	6
(United States) B Scanlon	2	6	2
13	(Nigeria) N Odizor	7	6
(Canada) S Bonneau	5	0
(United States) C Hooper	3	6	1
4	(United States) B Gilbert	6	2	6

Third round
5	(United States) J Kriek	4	6
(United States) M Davis	6	7
13	(Nigeria) N Odizor	3	4
4	(United States) B Gilbert	6	6

Quarterfinals
(United States) M Davis	4	4
4	(United States) B Gilbert	6	6

==== Section 4 ====
First round
(United States) J Lapidus	5	6	6
(Australia) M Kratzmann	7	4	2
Q	(United States) J Rive	3	4
(South Africa) C Steyn	6	6
(United States) B Willenborg	7	4	6
9	(United States) D Goldie	6	6	4
16	(United States) P Fleming	6	3	1
WC	(United States) J Ross	4	6	6
(South Africa) B Moir	3	5
WC	(United States) A Parker	6	7
(United States) R Matuszewski	7	6
WC	(United States) V Van Patten	5	0

Second round
8	(United States) J Berger	6	6
(United States) J Lapidus	2	3
(South Africa) C Steyn	6	6	2
(United States) B Willenborg	4	7	6
WC	(United States) J Ross	6	6
WC	(United States) A Parker	3	0
(United States) R Matuszewski	4	5
2/WC	(West Germany) B Becker	6	7

Third round
8	(United States) J Berger	6	6
(United States) B Willenborg	1	2
WC	(United States) J Ross	4	2
2/WC	(West Germany) B Becker	6	6

Quarterfinals
8	(United States) J Berger	3	2
2/WC	(West Germany) B Becker	6	6
