= 1984 West of England Championships – Doubles =

Doubles
- 1984 West of England Championships

Final
- Champions: (United States) Larry Stefanki (United States) Robert Van't Hof
- Runners-up: (Australia) John Alexander (Australia) John Fitzgerald
- Score: 6–4, 5–7, 9–7

Details
- Draw: 24
- Seeds: 8

Events
Singles	Doubles
- West of England Championships

John Alexander and John Fitzgerald were the defending champions, but lost in the final this year.

Larry Stefanki and Robert Van't Hof won the title, defeating Alexander and Fitzgerald 6–4, 5–7, 9–7 in the final.

== Seeds ==
1. (Australia) Mark Edmondson / (United States) Sherwood Stewart (second round)
2. (United States) Tim Gullikson / (United States) Tom Gullikson (second round)
3. (Australia) John Alexander / (Australia) John Fitzgerald (final)
4. (South Africa) Bernard Mitton / (United States) Butch Walts (second round, withdrew)
5. (United States) Gary Donnelly / (United States) Ken Flach (semifinals)
6. (Australia) Brad Drewett / (Nigeria) Nduka Odizor (quarterfinals)
7. (Australia) David Graham / (Australia) Laurie Warder (semifinals)
8. (United States) Victor Amaya / (India) Anand Amritraj (second round)

== Draw ==
Key

- Q = Qualifier
- WC = Wild card
- LL = Lucky loser
- Alt = Alternate
- ITF = ITF entry
- PR = Protected ranking
- SR = Special ranking
- SE = Special exempt
- JE = Junior exempt
- JR = Junior Accelerator Programme entrant
- CO = College Accelerator Programme entrant
- NG = Next Gen Accelerator Program entrant
- w/o = Walkover
- r = Retired
- d = Defaulted

=== Finals ===
Semifinals
(United States) Larry Stefanki (United States) Robert Van't Hof	7	4	10
5	(United States) Gary Donnelly (United States) Ken Flach	6	6	8
3	(Australia) John Alexander (Australia) John Fitzgerald	7	6
7	(Australia) David Graham (Australia) Laurie Warder	5	4

Final
(United States) Larry Stefanki (United States) Robert Van't Hof	6	5	9
3	(Australia) John Alexander (Australia) John Fitzgerald	4	7	7

=== Top half ===
First round
(United Kingdom) J Feaver (United Kingdom) J Smith	6	7	6
(United States) R Crowley (United States) R Evett	7	6	3
(United States) L Stefanki (United States) R Van't Hof	6	6
(United Kingdom) L Alfred (United Kingdom) M Guntrip	3	4
(United Kingdom) J Bates (United Kingdom) J Dier	6	6
(United States) M Leach (United States) J Mattke	4	3
(United States) M Freeman (United States) T Wilkison	6	7
(Brazil) G Barbosa (Brazil) J Soares	3	6

Second round
1	(Australia) M Edmondson (United States) S Stewart	3	3
(United Kingdom) J Feaver (United Kingdom) J Smith	6	6
(United States) L Stefanki (United States) R Van't Hof	6	6
8	(United States) V Amaya (India) A Amritraj	3	2
4	(South Africa) B Mitton (United States) B Walts
(United Kingdom) J Bates (United Kingdom) J Dier	w/o
(United States) M Freeman (United States) T Wilkison	3	3
5	(United States) G Donnelly (United States) K Flach	6	6

Quarterfinals
(United Kingdom) J Feaver (United Kingdom) J Smith	3	4
(United States) L Stefanki (United States) R Van't Hof	6	6
(United Kingdom) J Bates (United Kingdom) J Dier	2	2
5	(United States) G Donnelly (United States) K Flach	6	6

Semifinals
(United States) L Stefanki (United States) R Van't Hof	7	4	10
5	(United States) G Donnelly (United States) K Flach	6	6	8

=== Bottom half ===
First round
(Brazil) A Hocevar (Brazil) M Hocevar	6	6
(United Kingdom) S Bale (United Kingdom) N Fulwood	3	4
(United States) T Delatte (United States) J Kriek	3	6
(United States) M Davis (United States) C Dunk	6	7
(United States) H Pfister (South Africa) F McMillan	6	3
(Chile) R Acuña (Paraguay) F González	7	6
(Italy) S Colombo (Italy) G Ocleppo	6	4	4
(Peru) P Arraya (Spain) E Sánchez	4	6	6

Second round
6	(Australia) B Drewett (Nigeria) N Odizor	6	6	6
(Brazil) A Hocevar (Brazil) M Hocevar	7	4	4
(United States) M Davis (United States) C Dunk	4	4
3	(Australia) J Alexander (Australia) J Fitzgerald	6	6
7	(Australia) D Graham (Australia) L Warder	7	7
(Chile) R Acuña (Paraguay) F González	6	6
(Peru) P Arraya (Spain) E Sánchez	7	6
2	(United States) Ti Gullikson (United States) To Gullikson	6	3

Quarterfinals
6	(Australia) B Drewett (Nigeria) N Odizor	7	3	7
3	(Australia) J Alexander (Australia) J Fitzgerald	6	6	9
7	(Australia) D Graham (Australia) L Warder	7	6	6
(Peru) P Arraya (Spain) E Sánchez	6	7	3

Semifinals
3	(Australia) J Alexander (Australia) J Fitzgerald	7	6
7	(Australia) D Graham (Australia) L Warder	5	4
