= 1984 West of England Championships – Singles =

Singles
- 1984 West of England Championships

Final
- Champion: (United States) Johan Kriek
- Runner-up: (United States) Brian Teacher
- Score: 6–7, 7–6, 6–4

Details
- Draw: 48
- Seeds: 16

Events
Singles	Doubles
← 1983 ·	West of England Championships	· 1985 →

Johan Kriek was the defending champion.

Kriek successfully defended his title, defeating Brian Teacher 6–7, 7–6, 6–4 in the final.

== Seeds ==
1. (United States) Johan Kriek (champion)
2. (United States) Brian Teacher (final)
3. (United States) Tom Gullikson (second round)
4. (Australia) John Fitzgerald (third round)
5. (United States) Brian Gottfried (second round)
6. (United States) Tim Gullikson (quarterfinals)
7. (Italy) Gianni Ocleppo (third round)
8. (Nigeria) Nduka Odizor (semifinals)
9. (Australia) Brad Drewett (second round)
10. (India) Ramesh Krishnan (third round)
11. (United States) Ben Testerman (second round)
12. (Australia) Wally Masur (second round)
13. (Czechoslovakia) Miloslav Mečíř (third round)
14. (Spain) Emilio Sánchez (second round)
15. (United States) Robert Van't Hof (third round)
16. (United States) Marty Davis (quarterfinals)

== Draw ==
=== Key ===
- Q = Qualifier
- WC = Wild card
- LL = Lucky loser
- Alt = Alternate
- ITF = ITF entry
- PR = Protected ranking
- SR = Special ranking
- SE = Special exempt
- JE = Junior exempt
- JR = Junior Accelerator Programme entrant
- CO = College Accelerator Programme entrant
- NG = Next Gen Accelerator Program entrant
- w/o = Walkover
- r = Retired
- d = Defaulted

=== Finals ===
Semifinals
1	(United States) Johan Kriek	6	6
8	(Nigeria) Nduka Odizor	4	4
(United States) Lloyd Bourne	6	4
2	(United States) Brian Teacher	7	6

Final
1	(United States) Johan Kriek	6	7	6
2	(United States) Brian Teacher	7	6	4

=== Top half ===
==== Section 1 ====
First round
(United States) T Wilkison	6	6	6
(United States) S Meister	2	7	2
(Netherlands) H van Boeckel	4	3
(United States) J Sadri	6	6
(Switzerland) J Hlasek	6	6
(Australia) M Edmondson	7	7
(United States) M Freeman	6	7
(Italy) S Colombo	2	5

Second round
1	(United States) J Kriek	6	6
(United States) T Wilkison	1	3
(United States) J Sadri	4	4
10	(India) R Krishnan	6	6
12	(Australia) W Masur	4	6
(Australia) M Edmondson	6	7
(United States) M Freeman	4	4
6	(United States) Ti Gullikson	6	6

Third round
1	(United States) J Kriek	6	6
10	(India) R Krishnan	4	4
(Australia) M Edmondson	2	6	3
6	(United States) Ti Gullikson	6	3	6

Quarterfinals
1	(United States) J Kriek	6	6
6	(United States) Ti Gullikson	4	4

==== Section 2 ====
First round
(United Kingdom) J Bates	2	4
(United States) T Moor	6	6
(United States) M Leach	4	4
Q	(United States) J Turpin	6	6
(West Germany) R Gehring	6	2
Q	(Australia) D Mustard	7	6
(Israel) S Perkiss	4	4
Q	(Brazil) A Hocevar	6	6

Second round
4	(Australia) J Fitzgerald	2	6	6
(United States) T Moor	6	3	1
Q	(United States) J Turpin	7	6
14	(Spain) E Sánchez	6	0
15	(United States) R Van't Hof	7	6
Q	(Australia) D Mustard	6	4
Q	(Brazil) A Hocevar	3	1
8	(Nigeria) N Odizor	6	6

Third round
4	(Australia) J Fitzgerald	5	2
Q	(United States) J Turpin	7	6
15	(United States) R Van't Hof	6	4	7
8	(Nigeria) N Odizor	4	6	9

Quarterfinals
Q	(United States) J Turpin	4	6
8	(Nigeria) N Odizor	6	7

=== Bottom half ===
==== Section 3 ====
First round
(Australia) J Alexander	6	6
(United States) H Pfister	1	2
Q	(South Africa) E Edwards	6	6
(United Kingdom) S Shaw	3	2
Q	(France) L Courteau	3	1
(United States) L Bourne	6	6
(United States) G Holmes	6	3	5
(Chile) R Acuña	3	6	7

Second round
5	(United States) B Gottfried	3	4
(Australia) J Alexander	6	6
Q	(South Africa) E Edwards	7	6
11	(United States) B Testerman	6	3
9	(Australia) B Drewett	4	4
(United States) L Bourne	6	6
(Chile) R Acuña	6	6
3	(United States) To Gullikson	4	1

Third round
(Australia) J Alexander	6	6
Q	(South Africa) E Edwards	3	4
(United States) L Bourne	7	6
(Chile) R Acuña	6	3

Quarterfinals
(Australia) J Alexander	3	4
(United States) L Bourne	6	6

==== Section 4 ====
First round
(Brazil) J Soares	4	7	1
Q	(United States) J Lapidus	6	6	6
(Canada) G Michibata	6	6
(United Kingdom) S Bale	3	4
(Brazil) G Barbosa	6	6	5
(United States) L Shiras	7	4	7
(Paraguay) F González	3	3
(United States) D Pate	6	6

Second round
7	(Italy) G Ocleppo	7	6
Q	(United States) J Lapidus	5	2
(Canada) G Michibata	6	2
16	(United States) M Davis	7	6
13	(Czechoslovakia) M Mečíř	6	1	6
(United States) L Shiras	3	6	4
(United States) D Pate	3	6
2	(United States) B Teacher	6	7

Third round
7	(Italy) G Ocleppo	4	7	2
16	(United States) M Davis	6	6	6
13	(Czechoslovakia) M Mečíř	2	6
2	(United States) B Teacher	6	7

Quarterfinals
16	(United States) M Davis	3	5
2	(United States) B Teacher	6	7
