= 1988 Bristol Trophy =

Tennis tournament

- Date: 13-20 June
- Edition: 9th
- Category: Grand Prix circuit
- Draw: 48S / 16D
- Prize money: $93,400
- Surface: Grass / outdoor
- Location: Bristol, England
- Venue: Redland Green

Champions

Singles
- (West Germany) Christian Saceanu

Doubles
- (Australia) Peter Doohan / (Australia) Laurie Warder
← 1987 ·	Bristol Trophy	· 1989 →

The 1988 Bristol Trophy, also known as the Bristol Open, was a tennis tournament played on grass courts that was part of the 1988 Nabisco Grand Prix. It was played at Redland Green in Bristol, in Great Britain from 13 June to 20 June 1988. Eighth-seeded Christian Saceanu won the singles title and earned £10,000 first-prize money.

== Finals ==
=== Singles ===
(West Germany) Christian Saceanu defeated (India) Ramesh Krishnan 6–4, 2–6, 6–2

- It was Saceanu's only singles title of the year and the 1st of his career.

=== Doubles ===
(Australia) Peter Doohan / (Australia) Laurie Warder defeated (United States) Martin Davis / (United States) Tim Pawsat 2–6, 6–4, 7–5

- It was Doohan's only title of the year and the 5th of his career. It was Warder's 2nd title of the year and the 5th of his career.
