= 1987 Sovran Bank D.C. National Tennis Classic =

- Date: July 27 – August 2
- Edition: 19th
- Category: Grand Prix
- Draw: 56S / 28D
- Prize money: $232,000
- Surface: Hard / outdoor
- Location: Washington, D.C., United States
- Venue: Rock Creek Stadium

Champions

Singles
- (Czechoslovakia) Ivan Lendl

Doubles
- (United States) Gary Donnelly / (United States) Peter Fleming
- Washington Open

The 1987 Sovran Bank D.C. National Tennis Classic was a men's tennis event held on outdoor hard courts. The switch from clay to hard courts was made to attract more top players ahead of the US Open. It was the 19th edition of the tournament, which was part of the 1987 Grand Prix circuit, and was held at the Rock Creek Stadium in Washington, D.C. from July 27 through August 2, 1987. First-seeded Ivan Lendl won the singles title and earned $39,440 first-prize money.

== Finals ==
=== Singles ===
(Czechoslovakia) Ivan Lendl defeated (United States) Brad Gilbert 6–1, 6–0

- It was Lendl's 3rd singles title of the year and his 65th of his career.

=== Doubles ===
(United States) Gary Donnelly / (United States) Peter Fleming defeated (Australia) Laurie Warder / (United States) Blaine Willenborg 6–2, 7–6
