= 1989 Bristol Trophy =

- Date: 19–26 June
- Edition: 10th
- Category: Grand Prix
- Draw: 32S / 16D
- Prize money: $100,000
- Surface: Grass
- Location: Bristol, England
- Venue: Redland Green

Champions

Singles
- (West Germany) Eric Jelen

Doubles
- (United States) Paul Chamberlin / (United States) Tim Wilkison
- Bristol Trophy

The 1989 Bristol Trophy, also known as the Bristol Open, was a men's tennis tournament played on grass courts at Redland Green in Bristol in England that was part of the 1989 Nabisco Grand Prix. It was the tenth and last edition of the tournament and was held from 19 to 26 June 1989. Fourth-seeded Eric Jelen won the singles title.

== Finals ==
=== Singles ===
(West Germany) Eric Jelen defeated (United Kingdom) Nick Brown 6–4, 3–6, 7–5

- It was Jelen's only singles title of his career.

=== Doubles ===
(United States) Paul Chamberlin / (United States) Tim Wilkison defeated (United States) Mike De Palmer / (United States) Gary Donnelly 7–6^{(8–6)}, 6–4

- It was Chamberlin's only title of the year and the 1st of his career. It was Wilkison's 1st title of the year and the 15th of his career.
