= 1989 Livingston Open =

Tennis tournament

- Date: August 7–14
- Edition: 6th
- Category: Grand Prix
- Draw: 32S / 16D
- Prize money: $93,400
- Surface: Hard / outdoor
- Location: Livingston, New Jersey, U.S.
- Venue: Newark Academy

Champions

Singles
- (United States) Brad Gilbert

Doubles
- (United States) Tim Pawsat / (United States) Tim Wilkison
- Livingston Open

The 1989 Livingston Open was a men's tennis tournament played on outdoor hard courts that was part of the 1989 Nabisco Grand Prix. It was played at Newark Academy in Livingston, New Jersey in the United States from August 7 through August 14, 1989. Second-seeded Brad Gilbert won the singles title.

== Finals ==
=== Singles ===
(United States) Brad Gilbert defeated (Australia) Jason Stoltenberg 6–4, 6–4

- It was Gilbert's 3rd singles title of the year and the 15th of his career.

=== Doubles ===
(United States) Tim Pawsat / (United States) Tim Wilkison defeated (New Zealand) Kelly Evernden / (United States) Sammy Giammalva Jr. 7–5, 6–3

- It was Pawsat's 3rd title of the year and the 5th of his career. It was Wilkison's 2nd title of the year and the 16th of his career.
