= 1985 West of England Championships =

- Date: 17–24 June
- Edition: 6th
- Category: Grand Prix circuit
- Draw: 48S / 16D
- Prize money: $100,000
- Surface: Grass / outdoor (Note: The semifinals and final were played on indoor Supreme court.)
- Location: Bristol, England
- Venue: Redland Green

Champions

Singles
- (United States) Martin Davis

Doubles
- (South Africa) Eddie Edwards / (South Africa) Danie Visser
← 1984 ·	West of England Championships	· 1986 →

The 1985 West of England Championships, (Note: Officially the West of England Grass Court Championships.) also known as the Bristol Open, was a men's tennis tournament played on grass courts that was part of the 1985 Nabisco Grand Prix circuit. It was played at Redland Green in Bristol, Great Britain from 17 to 24 June 1985. The semifinals and final could not be played on the outdoor grass courts due to persistent rain and were moved to an indoor court at David Lloyds Racket Club in Heston. Eighth-seeded Marty Davis won the singles final in front of just a handful of spectators and commented "I haven't really played in many finals, and I didn't really care if it had to be switched here or to the Falkand Islands, I was just delighted to win it".

== Finals ==
=== Singles ===
(United States) Martin Davis defeated (United States) Glenn Layendecker 4–6, 6–3, 7–5

- It was Davis' 1st singles title of the year and the 3rd of his career.

=== Doubles ===
(South Africa) Eddie Edwards / (South Africa) Danie Visser defeated (Australia) John Alexander / (New Zealand) Russell Simpson 6–4, 7–6

- It was Edwards' 2nd title of the year and the 4th of his career. It was Visser's only title of the year and the 1st of his career.
