= 1984 West of England Championships =

- Date: 18–25 June
- Edition: 5th
- Category: Grand Prix
- Draw: 48S / 24D
- Prize money: $100,000
- Surface: Grass / outdoor
- Location: Bristol, England

Champions

Singles
- (United States) Johan Kriek

Doubles
- (United States) Larry Stefanki / (United States) Robert Van't Hof
← 1983 ·	West of England Championships	· 1985 →

The 1984 Bristol Open was a men's tennis tournament played on outdoor grass courts that was part of the 1984 Volvo Grand Prix. It was played at Bristol in Great Britain from 18 to 25 June 1984. It was the fifth edition of the tournament and the singles title was won by first-seeded Johan Kriek.

== Finals ==
=== Singles ===
(United States) Johan Kriek defeated (United States) Brian Teacher 6–7, 7–6, 6–4

- It was Kriek's 1st title of the year and the 16th of his career.

=== Doubles ===
(United States) Larry Stefanki / (United States) Robert Van't Hof defeated (Australia) John Alexander / (Australia) John Fitzgerald 6–4, 5–7, 9–7

- It was Stefanki's only title of the year and the 3rd of his career. It was Van't Hof's only title of the year and the 3rd of his career.
