= Tim Donovan =

American tennis player

- Full name: Timothy V. Donovan
- Country (sports): United States
- Born: February 20, 1967 (age 59) Pittsburgh, U.S.
- Height: 5 ft 9 in (175 cm)
- Prize money: $11,015

Singles
- Career record: 3–2
- Highest ranking: No. 346 (July 16, 1990)

Doubles
- Highest ranking: No. 473 (April 22, 1991)

Timothy Donovan (born February 20, 1967) is an American former professional tennis player.

Donovan is originally from Pittsburgh and is the youngest of eleven children. He played four years of collegiate tennis in the late 1980s for Brown University, where he was twice named Ivy League Player of the Year. Ranked as high as sixth in the NCAA Division I, he has since been inducted into the Brown University Hall of Fame.

Competing professionally after college, Donovan reached a best world ranking of 346. In 1989 he made the quarter-finals of the 1989 Livingston Open, with wins over Sammy Giammalva Jr. and the seventh-seeded Paul Annacone.
