= 1986 Bristol Trophy =

- Date: 16–23 June
- Edition: 7th
- Category: Grand Prix circuit
- Draw: 48S / 16D
- Prize money: $100,000
- Surface: Grass / outdoor
- Location: Bristol, England
- Venue: Redland Green

Champions

Singles
- (India) Vijay Amritraj

Doubles
- (South Africa) Christo Steyn / (South Africa) Danie Visser
← 1985 ·	West of England Championships	· 1987 →

The 1986 Bristol Trophy was a men's tennis tournament played on outdoor grass courts that was part of the 1986 Nabisco Grand Prix. It was the seventh edition of the tournament and was played at Redland Green in Bristol, England from 16 June to 23 June 1986. Unseeded Vijay Amritraj, who entered on a wildcard, won the singles title.

== Finals ==
=== Singles ===
(India) Vijay Amritraj defeated (France) Henri Leconte 7–6^{(8–6)}, 1–6, 8–6

- It was Amritraj's 1st singles title of the year and the 17th of his career.

=== Doubles ===
(South Africa) Christo Steyn / (South Africa) Danie Visser defeated (Australia) Mark Edmondson / (Australia) Wally Masur 6–7, 7–6, 12–10

- It was Steyn's 2nd title of the year and the 2nd of his career. It was Visser's only title of the year and the 2nd of his career.
