= 1985 D.C. National Bank Classic =

- Date: July 15–21
- Edition: 17th
- Category: Grand Prix
- Draw: 56S / 28D
- Prize money: $210,000
- Surface: Clay / outdoor
- Location: Washington, D.C., United States
- Venue: Rock Creek Park

Champions

Singles
- (France) Yannick Noah

Doubles
- (Chile) Hans Gildemeister / (Paraguay) Víctor Pecci
← 1984 ·	Washington Open	· 1986 →

The 1985 D.C. National Bank Classic was a men's tennis tournament and was played on outdoor green clay courts. The event was part of the 1985 Grand Prix circuit. It was the 17th edition of the tournament and was held at Rock Creek Park in Washington, D.C. from July 15 through July 21, 1985. Third-seeded Yannick Noah won the singles title and earned $35,700 first-prize money.

== Finals ==
=== Singles ===
(France) Yannick Noah defeated (Argentina) Martín Jaite 6–4, 6–3

- It was Noah's 2nd singles title of the year and the 16th of his career.

=== Doubles ===
(Chile) Hans Gildemeister / (Paraguay) Víctor Pecci defeated (Australia) David Graham / (Hungary) Balázs Taróczy 6–3, 1–6, 6–4
