= 1986 D.C. National Bank Classic =

- Date: July 28 – August 3
- Edition: 18th
- Category: Grand Prix
- Draw: 56S / 28D
- Prize money: $220,000
- Surface: Clay / outdoor
- Location: Washington, D.C., United States
- Venue: Rock Creek Park

Champions

Singles
- (Czechoslovakia) Karel Nováček

Doubles
- (Chile) Hans Gildemeister / (Ecuador) Andrés Gómez
- Washington Open

The 1986 D.C. National Bank Classic was a men's tennis tournament and was played on outdoor green clay courts. The event was part of the 1986 Grand Prix circuit. It was the 18th edition of the tournament and was held at Rock Creek Park in Washington, D.C. from July 28 through August 3, 1986. Unseeded Karel Nováček won the singles title after defeating five seeded players and earned $37,400 first-prize money.

== Finals ==
=== Singles ===
(Czechoslovakia) Karel Nováček defeated (France) Thierry Tulasne 6–1, 7–6^{(7–4)}

- It was Nováček's first singles title of his career.

=== Doubles ===
(Chile) Hans Gildemeister / (Ecuador) Andrés Gómez defeated (Brazil) Ricardo Acioly / (Brazil) César Kist 6–3, 7–5
