= Mike Brown (tennis) =

American tennis player

- Country (sports): United States
- Born: December 8, 1968 (age 56); Hialeah, Florida
- Height: 6 ft (183 cm)

Singles
- Career record: 2–2
- Highest ranking: No. 532 (5 Mar, 1990)

Doubles
- Career record: 1–1
- Highest ranking: No. 588 (14 May 1990)

Mike Brown (born December 8, 1968) is an American former professional tennis player.

Brown, a native of Florida, is the younger brother of tennis players Jimmy and Ricky.

As a collegiate tennis player for the University of Arkansas, Brown was a three-time All-American and twice won the Southwest Conference singles championship. He made the ITA All-American final in 1988 and attained the top singles ranking in 1989.

While competing on the professional tour, Brown's best performance was a quarter-final run at the 1989 Livingston Open, which included a win over sixth seed Kelly Evernden.
