= 1987 Bristol Trophy =

- Date: 15–22 June
- Edition: 8th
- Category: Grand Prix circuit
- Draw: 48S / 16D
- Prize money: $100,000
- Surface: Grass / outdoor
- Location: Bristol, England
- Venue: Redland Green

Champions

Singles
- (New Zealand) Kelly Evernden
← 1986 ·	Bristol Trophy	· 1988 →

The 1987 Bristol Open was a men's tennis tournament played on outdoor grass courts that was part of the 1987 Nabisco Grand Prix. It was the eighth edition of the tournament and was played at Redland Green in Bristol, England from 15 until 22 June 1987. Unseeded Kelly Evernden won the singles title. The doubles event was cancelled due to persistent rain during the tournament week.

== Finals ==
=== Singles ===
(New Zealand) Kelly Evernden defeated (United States) Tim Wilkison 6–4, 7–6^{(8–6)}

- It was Evernden's 1st singles title of his career.
