= Stephen Botfield =

English tennis player

- Country (sports): (United Kingdom) Great Britain
- Residence: Chingford, Essex
- Born: 10 April 1966 (age 58); London, England
- Height: 5 ft 11 in (1.80 m)
- Turned pro: 1984
- Plays: Right-handed
- Prize money: $46,689

Singles
- Career record: 2–6
- Career titles: 0
- Highest ranking: No. 274 (6 April 1987)

Grand Slam singles results
- Wimbledon: 2R (1986, 1988)

Doubles
- Career record: 4–5
- Career titles: 0
- Highest ranking: No. 227 (9 July 1990)

Grand Slam doubles results
- Wimbledon: 3R (1990)

Stephen Botfield (born 10 April 1966) is a former professional tennis player from England who competed for Great Britain.

== Career ==
Botfield competed in the Wimbledon Championships every year from 1986 to 1991. In his first appearance he won a five set match against world number 21 Emilio Sánchez, but was unable to get past Wally Masur in the second round. He also made the second round of the singles draw in 1988, when he beat Jaroslav Navrátil.

As a doubles player he formed a good partnership with James Turner. At the 1989 Wimbledon Championships, which they entered as wild cards, the pair had an upset win over sixth seeds Paul Annacone and Christo van Rensburg. They made the third round in 1990, winning their first two matches in five sets, both with an 8–6 scoreline.
