= Al Parker (tennis) =

American tennis player

- Country (sports): United States
- Born: December 22, 1968 (age 56) Savannah, Georgia
- Height: 6 ft 2 in (188 cm)
- Turned pro: 1991
- Plays: Right-handed
- Prize money: $32,734

Singles
- Career record: 1–10
- Career titles: 0
- Highest ranking: No. 261 (August 10, 1987)

Grand Slam singles results
- US Open: 1R (1986, 1987)

Doubles
- Career record: 2–7
- Career titles: 0
- Highest ranking: No. 307 (February 1, 1993)

Middleton Albert "Al" Parker (born December 22, 1968) is a former professional tennis player from the United States.

== Early life ==
Parker attended Pinewood Christian Academy, where his tennis talents were recognized during middle school.

== Career ==
=== Juniors ===
Parker won 25 USTA titles during his junior career. He made the boys' quarterfinals at the 1985 US Open and was runner-up to Javier Sánchez in the 1986 Orange Bowl (18s).

=== Pro tour and college tennis ===
He twice appeared in the men's singles draw of the US Open, in 1986, when he lost in the opening round to 13th seed Anders Järryd and 1987, when he lost a four set first round match to Tarik Benhabiles. He was a silver medalist at the 1987 Pan American Games and was a finalist at a Raleigh Challenger tournament in the same year.

Parker played collegiate tennis at the University of Georgia and reached the NCAA Division One singles semifinals in 1988. He was named the Academic All-American of the Year in 1990-91.

In the early 1990s he played professionally but was constantly hampered by injuries.

After his career, he earned an MBA from Harvard Business School.
