= James Turner (tennis) =

British tennis player

- Country (sports): (United Kingdom) Great Britain
- Born: 2 July 1965 (age 59); Bathford, England
- Height: 5 ft 11 in (180 cm)
- Plays: Right-handed
- Prize money: $51,682

Singles
- Career record: 2-7
- Career titles: 0
- Highest ranking: No. 228 (26 Mar 1990)

Grand Slam singles results
- Wimbledon: 1R (1989, 1990)

Doubles
- Career record: 7-6
- Career titles: 0
- Highest ranking: No. 210 (13 Aug 1990)

Grand Slam doubles results
- Wimbledon: 3R (1990)

James Turner (born 2 July 1965) is a former professional tennis player from England who competed for Great Britain.

== Career ==
Turner and partner Andrew Castle were doubles semi-finalists at the 1986 Bristol Open. He also made the second round of the singles draw, after beating Steve Shaw.

In the 1988 Stella Artois Championships, held at the Queen's Club in London, Turner had an upset win over world number 23 Slobodan Živojinović. Turner was the world's 742nd ranked player at the time. He was eliminated in the second round by Broderick Dyke.

Turner made his Grand Slam singles debut at the 1989 Wimbledon Championships, having received a wild card. Although the opening round match went to five sets, Czech player Karel Nováček defeated Turner. His only other singles appearance in Wimbledon, the following year, would also result in a first-round exit, to Guillaume Raoux.

He however never failed to get past the first round of the men's doubles at Wimbledon, in his four appearances at the tournament. In the 1989 he partnered Stephen Botfield and the pair defeated sixth seeds Paul Annacone and Christo van Rensburg. He also teamed up with Botfield at the 1990 Wimbledon Championships, where they made the round of 16. Their two wins both came in five set matches but when they were knocked out of the draw by Stefan Kruger and Greg Van Emburgh, it was in straight sets.
