= Tim Pawsat =

American tennis player

- Country (sports): United States
- Born: December 28, 1964 (age 61) Long Beach, California, U.S.
- Height: 6 ft 1 in (1.85 m)
- Plays: Right-handed

Singles
- Career record: 3–7
- Career titles: 0

Grand Slam singles results
- Australian Open: 3R (1989)
- French Open: 3R (1988, 1989, 1990)
- Wimbledon: 2R (1987, 1988, 1990)
- US Open: 2R (1986, 1989)

Doubles
- Career record: 93–92
- Career titles: 5

Grand Slam doubles results
- Australian Open: QF (1987)
- French Open: 3R (1989, 1990)
- Wimbledon: QF (1988)
- US Open: 1R (1987, 1988, 1989)
Medal record
Tennis
Representing United States
Summer Universiade
Silver medal – second place	1985 Kobe	Doubles

Tim Pawsat (born December 10, 1963, in Long Beach, California) is a former professional tennis player from the United States.

During his career, he won five doubles titles and finished runner-up an additional three times. He achieved a career-high doubles ranking of world No. 21 in 1990.

== Career finals ==
=== Doubles (5 wins, 3 losses) ===
Result	W–L	Date	Tournament	Surface	Partner	Opponents	Score
Loss	0–1	Jun 1987	London/Queen's Club, UK	Grass	(United States) Rick Leach	(France) Guy Forget (France) Yannick Noah	4–6, 4–6
Win	1–1	Jul 1987	Stuttgart Outdoor, Germany	Clay	(United States) Rick Leach	(Sweden) Mikael Pernfors (Sweden) Magnus Tideman	6–3, 6–4
Win	2–1	Jan 1988	Auckland, New Zealand	Hard	(United States) Martin Davis	(United States) Sammy Giammalva Jr. (United States) Jim Grabb	6–3, 3–6, 6–4
Loss	2–2	Jul 1988	Bristol, UK	Grass	(United States) Martin Davis	(Australia) Peter Doohan (Australia) Laurie Warder	6–2, 4–6, 5–7
Loss	2–3	Jun 1989	London/Queen's Club, UK	Grass	(Australia) Laurie Warder	(Australia) Darren Cahill (Australia) Mark Kratzmann	6–7, 3–6
Win	3–3	Aug 1989	Livingston, US	Hard	(United States) Tim Wilkison	(New Zealand) Kelly Evernden (United States) Sammy Giammalva Jr.	7–5, 6–3
Win	4–3	Sep 1989	Los Angeles, US	Hard	(United States) Martin Davis	(Australia) John Fitzgerald (Sweden) Anders Järryd	7–5, 7–6
Win	5–3	Oct 1989	Orlando, US	Hard	(United States) Scott Davis	(United States) Ken Flach (United States) Robert Seguso	7–5, 5–7, 6–4
