= Christo Steyn =

South African tennis player

- Country (sports): South Africa
- Born: 1 May 1961 (age 65) Springs, South Africa
- Height: 1.85 m (6 ft 1 in)
- Plays: Right-handed
- Prize money: $252,274

Singles
- Career record: 43–53
- Career titles: 0
- Highest ranking: No. 42 (18 Augustus 1986)

Grand Slam singles results
- Australian Open: 4R (1985)
- French Open: 1R (1986)
- Wimbledon: 3R (1985)
- US Open: 2R (1983, 1986)

Doubles
- Career record: 68–65
- Career titles: 2
- Highest ranking: No. 23 (9 March 1987)

Grand Slam doubles results
- Australian Open: 2R (1985)
- French Open: 1R (1985, 1986)
- Wimbledon: 3R (1986)
- US Open: 3R (1986)

Jan Christoffel 'Christo' Steyn (born 1 May 1961) is a former South African tennis player. Steyn won two Grand Prix doubles titles during his professional career.

A right-hander, Steyn reached his highest singles ATP ranking on 18 August 1986, when he became the No. 42 in the world, though he never won a Grand Prix or WCT tournaments singles title in his career.

== Career finals ==
=== Doubles: 7 (2 titles 5 runner-ups) ===
Result	W/L	Date	Tournament	Surface	Partner	Opponents	Score
Loss	0–1	Feb 1986	Toronto Indoor, Canada	Carpet (i)	(South Africa) Danie Visser	(Poland) Wojtek Fibak (Sweden) Joakim Nyström	3–6, 6–7
Win	1–1	Mar 1986	Milan, Italy	Carpet (i)	(United Kingdom) Colin Dowdeswell	(South Africa) Brian Levine (Australia) Laurie Warder	6–3, 4–6, 6–1
Loss	1–2	Apr 1986	WCT Atlanta, US	Carpet (i)	(South Africa) Danie Visser	(United States) Andy Kohlberg (United States) Robert Van't Hof	2–6, 3–6
Win	2–2	Jun 1986	Bristol Open, UK	Grass	(South Africa) Danie Visser	(Australia) Mark Edmondson (Australia) Wally Masur	6–7, 7–6, 12–10
Loss	2–3	Aug 1986	Cincinnati Masters, US	Hard	(South Africa) Danie Visser	(Australia) Mark Kratzmann (Australia) Kim Warwick	3–6, 4–6
Loss	2–4	Oct 1986	Tel Aviv, Israel	Hard	(South Africa) Danie Visser	(United States) John Letts (Sweden) Peter Lundgren	3–6, 6–3, 3–6
Loss	2–5	Jan 1987	Philadelphia, US	Carpet (i)	(South Africa) Danie Visser	(Spain) Sergio Casal (Spain) Emilio Sánchez	6–3, 1–6, 6–7
