= Laurie Warder =

Australian tennis player

- Country (sports): Australia
- Born: 23 October 1962 (age 62); Sydney, Australia
- Height: 1.83 m (6 ft 0 in)
- Plays: Right-handed
- Prize money: $864,953

Singles
- Career titles: 0
- Highest ranking: No. 210 (10 August 1987)

Doubles
- Career titles: 12
- Highest ranking: No. 12 (12 October 1991)

Grand Slam doubles results
- Australian Open: W (1993)
- French Open: QF (1987, 1991, 1992)
- Wimbledon: QF (1986, 1989)
- US Open: QF (1988)

Laurie Warder (born 23 October 1962) is a former professional male tennis player from Australia who specialized in the doubles event. In 1987 he lost the doubles title at the Australian Open partnering compatriot Peter Doohan, but won the event in 1993 partnering South African Danie Visser. Warder won 12 doubles titles during his career and achieved a highest doubles ranking of No. 12 in October 1991.

== Career finals ==
=== Doubles (12 titles, 18 runner-ups) ===
Result	No.	Date	Tournament	Surface	Partner	Opponents	Score
Loss	1.	1983	Auckland, New Zealand	Hard	(Australia) David Graham	(New Zealand) Chris Lewis (New Zealand) Russell Simpson	6–7, 3–6
Win	1.	1984	Newport, U.S.	Grass	(Australia) David Graham	(United States) Ken Flach (United States) Robert Seguso	6–4, 7–6
Loss	2.	1985	Bari, Italy	Clay	(United States) Marcel Freeman	(Argentina) Alejandro Ganzábal (Italy) Claudio Panatta	4–6, 2–6
Win	2.	1985	Florence, Italy	Clay	(Australia) David Graham	(New Zealand) Bruce Derlin (Australia) Carl Limberger	6–1, 6–1
Loss	3.	1986	Milan, Italy	Carpet	(South Africa) Brian Levine	(Zimbabwe) Colin Dowdeswell (South Africa) Christo Steyn	3–6, 6–4, 1–6
Loss	4.	1987	Adelaide, Australia	Grass	(Australia) Peter Doohan	(Czechoslovakia) Ivan Lendl (United States) Bill Scanlon	7–6, 3–6, 4–6
Loss	5.	1987	Australian Open, Melbourne	Grass	(Australia) Peter Doohan	(Sweden) Stefan Edberg (Sweden) Anders Järryd	4–6, 4–6, 6–7
Loss	6.	1987	Sydney Outdoor, Australia	Grass	(Australia) Peter Doohan	(Australia) Brad Drewett (Australia) Mark Edmondson	4–6, 6–4, 2–6
Win	3.	1987	Indianapolis, U.S.	Clay	(United States) Blaine Willenborg	(Sweden) Joakim Nyström (Sweden) Mats Wilander	6–0, 6–3
Loss	7.	1987	Washington, D.C., U.S.	Hard	(United States) Blaine Willenborg	(United States) Gary Donnelly (United States) Peter Fleming	2–6, 6–7
Loss	8.	1987	Montreal, Canada	Hard	(Australia) Peter Doohan	(Australia) Pat Cash (Sweden) Stefan Edberg	7–6, 3–6, 4–6
Win	4.	1988	Hamburg, West Germany	Clay	(Australia) Darren Cahill	(United States) Rick Leach (United States) Jim Pugh	6–4, 6–4
Win	5.	1988	Bristol, England	Grass	(Australia) Peter Doohan	(United States) Martin Davis (United States) Tim Pawsat	2–6, 6–4, 7–5
Win	6.	1989	Wellington, New Zealand	Hard	(Australia) Peter Doohan	(United States) Rill Baxter (Canada) Glenn Michibata	3–6, 6–2, 6–3
Loss	9.	1989	Munich, West Germany	Clay	(Australia) Peter Doohan	(Spain) Javier Sánchez (Hungary) Balázs Taróczy	6–7, 7–6, 6–7
Loss	10.	1989	London/Queen's Club, England	Grass	(United States) Tim Pawsat	(Australia) Darren Cahill (Australia) Mark Kratzmann	6–7, 3–6
Loss	11.	1989	Indianapolis, U.S.	Hard	(Australia) Peter Doohan	(South Africa) Pieter Aldrich (South Africa) Danie Visser	6–7, 6–7
Loss	12.	1991	Memphis, U.S.	Hard (i)	(Australia) John Fitzgerald	(Germany) Udo Riglewski (Germany) Michael Stich	5–7, 3–6
Win	7.	1991	Monte Carlo, Monaco	Clay	(United States) Luke Jensen	(Netherlands) Paul Haarhuis (Netherlands) Mark Koevermans	5–7, 7–6, 6–4
Loss	13.	1991	Rome, Italy	Clay	(United States) Luke Jensen	(Italy) Omar Camporese (Croatia) Goran Ivanišević	2–6, 3–6
Win	8.	1991	Bologna, Italy	Clay	(United States) Luke Jensen	(Brazil) Luiz Mattar (Brazil) Jaime Oncins	6–4, 7–6
Loss	14.	1991	Sydney Indoor, Australia	Hard (i)	(United States) Luke Jensen	(United States) Jim Grabb (United States) Richey Reneberg	4–6, 4–6
Loss	15.	1992	Estoril, Portugal	Clay	(United States) Luke Jensen	(Netherlands) Hendrik Jan Davids (Belgium) Libor Pimek	6–3, 3–6, 5–7
Win	9.	1992	Bologna, Italy	Clay	(United States) Luke Jensen	(Argentina) Javier Frana (Spain) Javier Sánchez	6–2, 6–3
Loss	16.	1992	Manchester, England	Grass	(United Kingdom) Jeremy Bates	(United States) Patrick Galbraith (Australia) David Macpherson	6–4, 3–6, 2–6
Loss	17.	1993	Adelaide, Australia	Hard	(Australia) John Fitzgerald	(Australia) Todd Woodbridge (Australia) Mark Woodforde	4–6, 5–7
Win	10.	1993	Australian Open, Melbourne	Hard	(South Africa) Danie Visser	(Australia) John Fitzgerald (Sweden) Anders Järryd	6–4, 6–3, 6–4
Win	11.	1993	Nice, France	Clay	(Australia) David Macpherson	(United States) Shelby Cannon (United States) Scott Melville	3–4, RET.
Win	12.	1993	Bologna, Italy	Clay	(South Africa) Danie Visser	(United States) Luke Jensen (United States) Murphy Jensen	4–6, 6–4, 6–4
Loss	18.	1994	Sydney Outdoor, Australia	Hard	(Australia) Mark Kratzmann	(Australia) Darren Cahill (Australia) Sandon Stolle	1–6, 6–7
