= Bristol Open =

West of England Championships Bristol Open

Defunct tennis tournament
- Tour: WCT (1971); Grand Prix circuit (1980–89); WTA Tour (1971–72)
- Founded: 1881
- Abolished: 1989
- Editions: 81
- Location: Bath, Bristol, England

The Bristol Open, originally known as the West of England Championships and the West of England Lawn Tennis Championships is a defunct tennis tournament that was originally hosted in Bath, Somerset, England, from 1881 till 1895. It was staged briefly in Bristol, England, in 1896, then from 1920 onwards was hosted again in Bristol annually until the tournament ceased in 1989. The tournament was played on grass courts in the weeks preceding the Wimbledon Championships usually June.

== History ==
The West of England Championships were originally held in Bath from 1881 until 1895; the tournament then transferred to Bristol in 1896. In 1897 the event ceased for period of 24 years. It was reinstated in 1920 and was played in Bristol for the remainder of its run. At the start of the Open Era the tournament was part of the independent tour circuit. In 1971 the event was renamed the Bristol Open; the men's event became part of the World Championship Tennis tour and the women's was part of the International Grand Prix. The women's event stopped in 1973 and was not held again. Although the men's tournament also stopped in 1973, it was reinstated in 1980 and became part of the Grand Prix tennis circuit until 1989.

== Finals ==
Notes: Challenge round: the final round of a tournament, in which the winner of a single-elimination phase faces the previous year's champion, who plays only that one match. The challenge round was used in the early history of tennis (from 1877 through 1921), in some tournaments not all.

* Indicates challenger

=== Men's singles ===
West of England Championships
Year	Champions	Runners-up	Score
1881	(Ireland) Ernest Browne	(England) C. K. Wood	6–4, 6–2, 6–4
1882	(England) George M. Butterworth	(England) Alexander K. Butterworth	6–4, 6–4
1883	(Ireland) Ernest Browne (2)	(England) Wilfred Milne	6–3, 6–2, 6–3
1884	(England) Pelham Von Donop	(England) John C. Kay	5–6, 6–5, 6–3
1885	(Ireland) Ernest Browne (3)	(United States) James Dwight	6–3, 6–1, 6–4
1886	(United States) James Dwight	(England) Harry Grove	6–4, 6–3, 6–4
1887	(England) Harry Grove	(United States) James Dwight	3–6, 6–4, 6–4, 6–2
1888	(United Kingdom) Harry S. Barlow	(United Kingdom) James Baldwin	6–4, 6–3, 8–10, 3–6, 8–6
1889	(United Kingdom) James Baldwin	(England) Wilfred Milne	7–5, 6–4, 6–4
1890	(United Kingdom) Harry S. Barlow (2)	(United Kingdom) James Baldwin	7–5, 6–3, 6–2
1891	(United Kingdom) Harry S. Barlow (3)	(United Kingdom) James Baldwin	2–6, 6–3, 6–4, 6–4
1895	(England) Roy Allen	(Ireland) George Ball-Greene	14–12, 6–4, 7–5
1896	(Ireland) Harold Mahony	(United States) William Larned	6–3, 6–3, 6–2
1897–1919	Not held (tournament is not staged for 24 years re-emerges after WW1)		
1920	(New Zealand) Francis Fisher	(United Kingdom) Frank Riseley	5–7, 6–4, 6–2, 6–2
1921	(United Kingdom) Sydney Jacob	(New Zealand) Francis Fisher	9–7, 6–2, 4–6, 6–0
1922	(South Africa) Brian Norton	(United Kingdom) Theodore Mavrogordato	6–3, 6–3
1923	(South Africa) Patrick Wheatley	(United Kingdom) F. R. L. Crawford	6–4, 6–3, 6–2
1924	(South Africa) Jack Condon	(United Kingdom) Frank Riseley	7–5, 6–2, 8–6
1925	(United Kingdom) Frank Riseley	(United Kingdom) J. G. Hogan	6–3, 6–4
1927	(United Kingdom) Sydney Jacob	(India) A. E. Browne	6–3 6–2
1928	(Republic of Ireland) Dennis O'Callaghan	(United Kingdom) Sydney Jacob	9–7, 5–7, 6–3
1929	(Republic of Ireland) George Lyttleton-Rogers	(United Kingdom) E. B. N. Taylor	6–1, 6–2
1930	(Republic of Ireland) George Lyttleton-Rogers (2)	(United Kingdom) George Godsell	6–3, 3–6, 6–4
1931	(Republic of Ireland) George Lyttleton-Rogers (3	(United Kingdom) Nigel Sharpe	6–2, 6–1, 7–5
1933	(Germany) Daniel Prenn	(Netherlands) Hendrik Timmer	6–2, 7–9, 6–4, 6–4
1934	(United Kingdom) George Godsell	(United Kingdom) Brian J. Sturgeon	6–4, 0–6, 6–3, 6–4
1935	(United Kingdom) Donald Butler	(Republic of Ireland) George Lyttleton-Rogers	8-,6 11–9, 9–7
1936	(New Zealand) Cam Malfroy	(United Kingdom) Robert Tinkler	4–6, 6–0, 6–4, 6–4
1937	(New Zealand) Alan Stedman	(Republic of China (1912–1949)) Kho Sin-Kie	6–1, 1–6, 6–4
1938	(India) Jimmy Mehta	(New Zealand) Cam Malfroy	6–2, 6–3
1939	(United Kingdom) Donald Butler	(Germany) Gottfried von Cramm	6–4, 6–3, 1–6, 5–7, 8–6
1940–1945	Not held (partly due to World War II)		
1946	(Republic of China (1912–1949)) Kho Sin-Kie	(Poland) Ignacy Tłoczyński	6–4; 6–4
1947	(India) Sumant Misra	(India) Madan Atri Mohan	6–4, 4–6, 6–2
1948	(South Africa) Eric Sturgess	(India) Sumant Misra	6–4, 2–6, 6–2, 6–4
1949	(Philippines) Felicisimo Ampon	(South Africa) Syd Levy	6–1, 6–2, 6–1
1950	(Egypt) Jaroslav Drobný	(Czechoslovakia) Vladimír Černík	6–3, 10–8
1951	(United States) Straight Clark	(United States) Harold Burrows	9–7, 3–6, 5–7, 6–1, 7–5
1952	(Egypt) Jaroslav Drobný (2)	(Brazil) Armando Vieira	7–5, 6–1
1953	(United States) Vic Seixas	(Argentina) Enrique Morea	6–3, 6–1, 8–6
1954	(Egypt) Jaroslav Drobný (3)	(Australia) Jack Arkinstall	walkover
1955	(Argentina) Enrique Morea	(United States) Sidney Schwartz	2–6, 10–8, 6–2, 6–2
1956	(Chile) Luis Ayala	(South Africa) Gordon Forbes	6–2, 8–10, 6–4
1957	(Australia) Lew Hoad	(United Kingdom) Roger Becker	6–2, 6–3, 6–0
1958	(United Kingdom) Mike Davies	(India) Ramanathan Krishnan	6–1, 6–4, 7–9, 6–4
1959	(India) Ramanathan Krishnan	(United Kingdom) Jaroslav Drobný	11–9, 6–0
1960	(United States) Ronald Holmberg	(Mexico) Antonio Palafox	6–3, 6–4
1961	(United States) Chuck McKinley	(Australia) Bob Mark	6–3, 6–2, 6–4
1962	(Australia) Fred Stolle	(Mexico) Antonio Palafox	6–3, 6–4
1963	(Australia) Fred Stolle (2)	(United States) Chuck McKinley	6–3, 6–4
1964	(United States) Chuck McKinley	(South Africa) Frew McMillan	6–4, 6–4, 6–2
1965	(United States) Dennis Ralston	(United States) Clark Graebner	6–2 6–2
1966	(United States) Cliff Richey	(Canada) Mike Belkin	6–1, 6–3
1967	(Netherlands) Tom Okker	(South Africa) Cliff Drysdale	6–2, 5–7, 8–6
1968	(United States) Arthur Ashe	(United States) Clark Graebner	6–4, 6–3
↓ Open era ↓
West of England Open Championships
1969	(Australia) Ken Rosewall	(France) Pierre Barthès	8–10, 6–3, 6–1
1970	(Socialist Federal Republic of Yugoslavia) Nikola Pilić	(Australia) Rod Laver	6–3, 1–6, 6–3
1971	(Australia) Rod Laver	(South Africa) Cliff Drysdale	w.o.
Bristol Open
1972	(South Africa) Bob Hewitt	(United States) Alex Olmedo	6–4, 6–3
1973–80	Not held		
1981	(Australia) Mark Edmondson	(United States) Roscoe Tanner	6–3, 5–7, 6–4
1982	(Australia) John Alexander	(United States) Tim Mayotte	6–3, 6–4
1983	(United States) Johan Kriek	(United States) Tom Gullikson	7–6, 7–5
1984	(United States) Johan Kriek (2)	(United States) Brian Teacher	6–7, 7–6, 6–4
1985	(United States) Martin Davis	(United States) Glenn Layendecker	4–6, 6–3, 7–5
1986	(India) Vijay Amritraj	(France) Henri Leconte	7–6, 1–6, 8–6
1987	(New Zealand) Kelly Evernden	(United States) Tim Wilkison	6–4, 7–6
1988	(West Germany) Christian Saceanu	(India) Ramesh Krishnan	6–4, 2–6, 6–2
1989	(West Germany) Eric Jelen	(United Kingdom) Nick Brown	6–4, 3–6, 7–5

=== Women's singles ===
West of England Championships
Year	Champions	Runners-up	Score
1881	(England) Gertrude Gibbs	(England) Annie Layard	6–0, 7–5
1882	(England) Fanny Morris	(England) Gertrude Gibbs	6–4, 6–4
1883	(England) Maud Watson	(England) N. Pope	6–1, 6–2
1884	(England) Edith Davies	(Ireland) Lilian Cole	6–4, 6–4
1885	(England) Gertrude Gibbs (2)	(England) Edith Davies	2–6, 6–4, 6–0
1886	(England) Lottie Dod	(England) Maud Watson	7–5, 6–4
1887	(England) Lottie Dod (2)	(England) Maud Watson	7–5, 6–4
1888	(England) Lottie Dod (3)	(England) N. Pope	6–3, 6–0
1889	(Ireland) Louisa Martin	(Ireland) Florence Stanuell	4–6, 6–1, 6–2
1890	(Ireland) Louisa Martin (2)	(England) N. Pope	6–3, 8–6
1891	(England) N. Pope	(United Kingdom) Mary Agg	6–0, 7–5
1892–94	Not held		
1895	(United Kingdom) Helen Jackson	(United Kingdom) Madeline Fisher O'Neill	6–1, 6–1
1896	(United Kingdom) Charlotte Cooper	(United Kingdom) Ruth Dyas	4–6, 7–5, 6–3
1899–1919	Not held (then due to World War I)		
1920	(United Kingdom) Mabel Parton	(United Kingdom) Doris Covell Craddock	9–7, 6–8, 6–4
1921	(United Kingdom) Phyllis Howkins	(United Kingdom) Doris Covell Craddock	10–8, 6–2
1922	(United Kingdom) Doris Covell Craddock	(United Kingdom) Edith Boucher Hannam	6–1, 6–1
1923	(United States) Elizabeth Ryan	(United Kingdom) Doris Covell Craddock	8–6, 6–3
1924	(United Kingdom) Phyllis Howkins Covell (2)	(United Kingdom) Joan Austin	6–4, 6–3
1925	(United Kingdom) Kathleen Lidderdale Bridge	(United Kingdom) Doris Covell Craddock	6–4, 1–6, 6–3
1926	Not held		
1927	(United Kingdom) Mary McIlquham	(United Kingdom) Margaret McKane Stocks	6–1, 6–1
1928	(United Kingdom) Phyllis Howkins Covell (3)	(United Kingdom) Betty Dix	7–5, 6–1
1929	(United Kingdom) Gethyn Harry	(United Kingdom) Mrs Helen Boucher	4–6, 6–1, 6–1
1930	(United Kingdom) Kathleen Lidderdale Bridge	(United Kingdom) Freda Scott	6–1, 8–6
1931	(United Kingdom) Doris Eastley	(United Kingdom) Vera Montgomery	3–6, 7–5, 6–3
1932	Not held		
1933	(United Kingdom) Kay Stammers	(United Kingdom) Andrée Lucas	6–2, 6–2
1934	(United Kingdom) Andrée Lucas	(United Kingdom) Gethyn Harry	6–2, 6–2
1935	(United Kingdom) Gethyn Harry (2)	(United Kingdom) Mona Riddell	6–4, 4–6, 6–3
1936	(Denmark) Hilde Krahwinkel Sperling	(United Kingdom) Daphne White Birch	6–2, 6–2
1937	(Chile) Anita Lizana	(Denmark) Hilde Krahwinkel Sperling	?
1938	(United Kingdom) Mona Riddell	(United Kingdom) Gem Hoahing	1–6, 6–3, 6–4
1939	(United Kingdom) Diana Wood	(United Kingdom) Joan Curry	6–2, 8–10, 6–2
1940	(United Kingdom) Kay Stammers Menzies	(United Kingdom) Peggy Scriven	8–10, 6–3, 6–3
1941–45	Not held (partly due to World War II)		
1946	(United Kingdom) Joy Marriott Hibbert	(United Kingdom) Miss Moss	3–6, 6–3, 6–2
1947	(United Kingdom) Joan Curry	(United Kingdom) Pam Seaton Bocquet	6–4, 6–0
1948	(United Kingdom) Joan Curry (2)	(United Kingdom) Pam Seaton Bocquet	6–2, 6–3
1949	(United Kingdom) Joan Curry (3)	(United Kingdom) Peggy McCorkindale	3–6, 6–3, 9–7
1950	(United States) Dorothy Head	(Czechoslovakia) Helena Straubeová	6–3, 6–1
1951	(United States) Beverly Baker	(South Africa) Beryl Bartlett	6–3; 6–3
1952	(United States) Patricia Canning Todd	(South Africa) Beryl Bartlett	7–5, 6–2
1953	(United States) Doris Hart	(United Kingdom) Angela Mortimer	7–5, 6–3
1954	(United Kingdom) Pat Ward	(Bermuda) Heather Nicholls-Brewer	divided title
1955	(United States) Doris Hart (2)	(United States) Dorothy Head Knode	6–1, 6–3
1956	(United States) Althea Gibson	(Australia) Daphne Seeney	6–2 10–8
1957	(United Kingdom) Angela Mortimer	(West Germany) Edda Buding	7–5, 6–0
1958	(Brazil) Maria Bueno	(United Kingdom) Angela Mortimer	6–0, 6–3
1959	(Brazil) Maria Bueno (2)	(South Africa) Sandra Reynolds	6–4, 6–3
1960	(United Kingdom) Deidre Catt	(South Africa) Renée Schuurman	7–5, 7–5
1961	(South Africa) Sandra Reynolds	(United Kingdom) Deidre Catt	7–5, 10–8
1962	(Australia) Margaret Smith	(Brazil) Maria Bueno	6–1, 3–6, 6–2
1963	(West Germany) Edda Buding	(United Kingdom) Elizabeth Starkie	9–7, 6–3
1964	(United States) Karen Hantze Susman	(France) Françoise Dürr	6–8, 6–3, 6–3
1965	(United States) Nancy Richey	(United Kingdom) Elizabeth Starkie	7–5, 6–2
1966	(Netherlands) Betty Stöve	(Argentina) Norma Baylon	6–3, 7–5
1967	(Rhodesia) Pat Walkden	(United Kingdom) Edda Buding	0–6, 6–4, 6–3
1968	(Australia) Kerry Melville	(Australia) Karen Krantzcke	6–0, 6–1
↓ Open era ↓
West of England Open Championships
1969	(Australia) Margaret Smith Court (2)	(United States) Billie Jean Moffitt King	6–3, 6–3
1970	(Australia) Margaret Smith Court (3)	(France) Françoise Dürr	6–1, 6–1
1971	Not held		
Bristol Open
1972	(United States) Billie Jean Moffitt King	(Australia) Kerry Melville	6–3, 6–2
1973–80	Not held (women's tournament ends)		

=== Men's doubles ===
Year	Champions	Runners-up	Score
1972	(South Africa) Bob Hewitt (South Africa) Frew McMillan	(United States) Clark Graebner (Australia) Lew Hoad	6–3, 6–2
1973–80	Not held		
1981	(United States) Billy Martin (New Zealand) Russell Simpson	(United States) John Austin (South Africa) Johan Kriek	6–3, 4–6, 6–4
1982	(United States) Tim Gullikson (United States) Tom Gullikson	(Australia) Mark Edmondson (Australia) Kim Warwick	6–4, 7–6
1983	(Australia) John Alexander (Australia) John Fitzgerald	(United States) Tom Gullikson (United States) Johan Kriek	7–5, 6–4
1984	(United States) Larry Stefanki (United States) Robert Van't Hof	(Australia) John Alexander (Australia) John Fitzgerald	6–4, 5–7, 9–7
1985	(South Africa) Eddie Edwards (South Africa) Danie Visser	(Australia) John Alexander (New Zealand) Russell Simpson	6–4, 7–6
1986	(South Africa) Christo Steyn (South Africa) Danie Visser	(Australia) Mark Edmondson (Australia) Wally Masur	6–7, 7–6, 12–10
1987	Not available		
1988	(Australia) Peter Doohan (Australia) Laurie Warder	(United States) Marty Davis (United States) Tim Pawsat	2–6, 6–4, 7–5
1989	(United States) Paul Chamberlin (United States) Tim Wilkison	(United States) Mike De Palmer (United States) Gary Donnelly	7–6, 6–4

== See also ==
- Bristol and Clifton Open (1882–1897) tennis tournament held in Clifton, Bristol.
