= Tim Wilkison =

American tennis player

- Country (sports): United States
- Residence: Charlotte, North Carolina
- Born: November 23, 1959 (age 66) Shelby, North Carolina
- Height: 5 ft 11 in (1.80 m)
- Turned pro: 1979
- Retired: 1993
- Plays: Left-handed
- Prize money: $1,289,085

Singles
- Career record: 291–296
- Career titles: 6
- Highest ranking: No. 23 (September 29, 1986)

Grand Slam singles results
- Australian Open: 4R (1985, 1987)
- French Open: 2R (1990)
- Wimbledon: 3R (1979, 1981)
- US Open: QF (1986)

Doubles
- Career record: 263–257
- Career titles: 10
- Highest ranking: No. 21 (July 31, 1989)

Grand Slam doubles results
- Australian Open: SF (1979)
- French Open: 3R (1985)
- Wimbledon: SF (1979)
- US Open: QF (1979)

Tim Wilkison (born November 23, 1959) is a former professional tennis player from the United States.

== Tennis career ==
Wilkison was the No. 1 ranked junior in the United States and played on the tour for over 25 years. He prepped at McCallie School in Chattanooga, Tennessee before turning pro immediately after high school. The left-hander won six singles titles, ten doubles championships, and reached a career-high singles ranking of world No. 23 in September 1986. Wilkison is perhaps best known for his diving volleys at Wimbledon that earned him the nickname "Dr. Dirt".

In his playing career, Wilkison had victories over Arthur Ashe, Stan Smith, Roscoe Tanner, Guillermo Vilas, Yannick Noah, Boris Becker, Jim Courier, John McEnroe, Andre Agassi, and Pete Sampras.

His best Grand Slam singles result came at the 1986 US Open, where he reached the quarterfinals by defeating Horst Skoff, Paul McNamee, Yannick Noah and Andrei Chesnokov, before losing to Stefan Edberg in straight sets. Wilkison has stated that his preferred surface is clay.

His eldest son, MacLane, played college tennis at UNC.

== Career finals ==
=== Singles: 15 (6 titles / 9 runner-ups) ===
Result	W-L	Date	Tournament	Surface	Opponent	Score
Loss	0–1	Jan 1977	Auckland, New Zealand	Grass	(India) Vijay Amritraj	6–7, 7–5, 1–6, 2–6
Win	1–1	Dec 1978	Sydney Outdoor, Australia	Grass	(Australia) Kim Warwick	6–3, 6–3, 6–7^{(3–7)}, 3–6, 6–2
Win	2–1	Jan 1979	Auckland, New Zealand	Hard	(Austria) Peter Feigl	6–3, 4–6, 6–4, 2–6, 6–2
Loss	2–2	Jan 1980	Auckland, New Zealand	Hard	(United States) John Sadri	4–6, 6–3, 3–6, 4–6
Loss	2–3	Oct 1980	Maui, U.S.	Hard	(United States) Eliot Teltscher	6–7, 3–6
Loss	2–4	Jan 1981	Auckland, New Zealand	Hard	(United States) Bill Scanlon	7–6, 3–6, 6–3, 6–7, 0–6
Win	3–4	Dec 1981	Sydney Outdoor, Australia	Grass	(New Zealand) Chris Lewis	6–4, 7–6, 6–3
Win	4–4	Jan 1982	Auckland, New Zealand	Hard	(New Zealand) Russell Simpson	6–4, 6–4, 6–4
Loss	4–5	Aug 1984	North Conway, U.S.	Clay	(Sweden) Joakim Nyström	2–6, 5–7
Loss	4–6	Oct 1984	Basel, Switzerland	Hard (i)	(Sweden) Joakim Nyström	3–6, 6–3, 4–6, 2–6
Win	5–6	Oct 1984	Vienna, Austria	Carpet (i)	(Czechoslovakia) Pavel Složil	6–1, 6–1, 6–2
Win	6–6	Mar 1985	Nancy, France	Carpet (i)	(Socialist Federal Republic of Yugoslavia) Slobodan Živojinović	4–6, 7–6, 9–7
Loss	6–7	Apr 1986	Atlanta, U.S.	Carpet (i)	(United States) Kevin Curren	6–7^{(5–7)}, 6–7^{(2–7)}
Loss	6–8	Jul 1986	Newport, U.S.	Grass	(United States) Bill Scanlon	5–7, 4–6
Loss	6–9	Jun 1987	Bristol, England	Grass	(New Zealand) Kelly Evernden	4–6, 6–7

=== Doubles: 24 (10 titles / 14 runner-ups) ===
Result	W-L	Date	Tournament	Surface	Partner	Opponents	Score
Loss	0–1	Aug 1979	North Conway, U.S.	Clay	(United States) John Sadri	(Romania) Ion Țiriac (Argentina) Guillermo Vilas	4–6, 6–7
Loss	0–2	Jan 1980	Auckland, New Zealand	Hard	(United States) John Sadri	(Austria) Peter Feigl (Australia) Rod Frawley	2–6, 5–7
Win	1–2	Jun 1980	Manchester, England	Grass	(United States) John Sadri	(United States) Dennis Ralston (United States) Roscoe Tanner	6–7, 7–5, 6–2
Loss	1–3	Oct 1980	Melbourne Indoor, Australia	Carpet (i)	(United States) John Sadri	(United States) Fritz Buehning (United States) Ferdi Taygan	1–6, 2–6
Win	2–3	Jan 1981	Auckland, New Zealand	Hard	(United States) Ferdi Taygan	(United States) Tony Graham (United States) Bill Scanlon	7–5, 6–1
Win	3–3	Oct 1981	Vienna, Austria	Carpet (i)	(United States) Steve Denton	(United States) Sammy Giammalva Jr. (United States) Fred McNair	4–6, 6–3, 6–4
Loss	3–4	Nov 1982	Taipei, Taiwan	Carpet (i)	(United States) Fred McNair	(United States) Larry Stefanki (United States) Robert Van't Hof	3–6, 6–7
Loss	3–5	Apr 1984	Bari, Italy	Clay	(United States) Marcel Freeman	(Czechoslovakia) Stanislav Birner (Belgium) Libor Pimek	6–2, 6–7, 4–6
Loss	3–6	Oct 1984	Basel, Switzerland	Hard (i)	(Sweden) Stefan Edberg	(Czechoslovakia) Pavel Složil (Czechoslovakia) Tomáš Šmíd	6–7, 2–6
Win	4–6	Nov 1984	Treviso, Italy	Clay	(Czechoslovakia) Pavel Složil	(Sweden) Jan Gunnarsson (United States) Sherwood Stewart	7–5, 6–3
Loss	4–7	Nov 1984	Toulouse, France	Hard (i)	(Czechoslovakia) Pavel Složil	(Sweden) Jan Gunnarsson (Denmark) Michael Mortensen	4–6, 2–6
Loss	4–8	Oct 1985	Basel, Switzerland	Hard (i)	(United States) Mark Dickson	(United States) Tim Gullikson (United States) Tom Gullikson	6–4, 4–6, 4–6
Win	5–8	Jul 1986	Newport, U.S.	Grass	(India) Vijay Amritraj	(South Africa) Eddie Edwards (Paraguay) Francisco González	4–6, 7–5, 7–6
Loss	5–9	Sep 1987	Los Angeles, U.S.	Hard	(United States) Brad Gilbert	(United States) Kevin Curren (United States) David Pate	3–6, 4–6
Win	6–9	Oct 1987	Vienna, Austria	Carpet (i)	(United States) Mel Purcell	(Spain) Emilio Sánchez (Spain) Javier Sánchez	6–3, 7–5
Loss	6–10	Aug 1988	Toronto, Canada	Hard	(United Kingdom) Andrew Castle	(United States) Ken Flach (United States) Robert Seguso	6–7, 3–6
Win	7–10	Aug 1988	Rye Brook, U.S.	Hard	(United Kingdom) Andrew Castle	(United Kingdom) Jeremy Bates (Denmark) Michael Mortensen	4–6, 7–5, 7–6
Loss	7–11	Oct 1988	San Francisco, U.S.	Carpet	(United States) Scott Davis	(United States) John McEnroe (Australia) Mark Woodforde	4–6, 6–7
Win	8–11	Oct 1988	Scottsdale, U.S.	Hard	(United States) Scott Davis	(United States) Rick Leach (United States) Jim Pugh	6–4, 7–6
Loss	8–12	Nov 1988	Johannesburg, South Africa	Hard (i)	(South Africa) Gary Muller	(United States) Kevin Curren (United States) David Pate	6–7, 4–6
Loss	8–13	Feb 1989	Memphis, U.S.	Hard (i)	(United States) Scott Davis	(United States) Paul Annacone (South Africa) Christo van Rensburg	6–7, 7–6, 1–6
Loss	8–14	Apr 1989	Rio de Janeiro, Brazil	Carpet	(United States) Patrick McEnroe	(Mexico) Jorge Lozano (United States) Todd Witsken	6–2, 4–6, 4–6
Win	9–14	Jun 1989	Bristol, England	Grass	(United States) Paul Chamberlin	(United States) Mike De Palmer (United States) Gary Donnelly	7–6, 6–4
Win	10–14	Aug 1989	Livingston, U.S.	Hard	(United States) Tim Pawsat	(New Zealand) Kelly Evernden (United States) Sammy Giammalva Jr.	7–5, 6–3
