= Jim Pugh =

American tennis player

- Country (sports): United States
- Residence: Manhattan Beach, California, U.S.
- Born: February 5, 1964 (age 62) Burbank, California, U.S.
- Height: 1.93 m (6 ft 4 in)
- Turned pro: 1985
- Retired: 1996
- Plays: Right-handed (two-handed backhand)
- Prize money: US$ 1,780,466

Singles
- Career record: 85–95
- Career titles: 1
- Highest ranking: No. 37 (23 November 1987)

Grand Slam singles results
- Australian Open: 2R (1988)
- French Open: 3R (1987)
- Wimbledon: 3R (1989)
- US Open: 3R (1987)

Doubles
- Career record: 276–167
- Career titles: 22
- Highest ranking: No. 1 (19 June 1989)

Grand Slam doubles results
- Australian Open: W (1988, 1989)
- French Open: F (1991)
- Wimbledon: W (1990)
- US Open: F (1988)

Grand Slam mixed doubles results
- Australian Open: W (1988, 1989, 1990)
- French Open: QF (1988)
- Wimbledon: W (1989)
- US Open: W (1988)
- Last updated on: 22 November 2021.

Jim Pugh (born February 5, 1964) is a former professional tennis player from the United States. He grew up in Palos Verdes, California and at age 10 began taking tennis lessons from John Hillebrand. He played tennis at UCLA. He became a doubles specialist on the ATP Tour and won three Grand Slam men's doubles titles (two Australian Open, one Wimbledon) and five Grand Slam mixed doubles titles (three Australian Open, one Wimbledon, one US Open). Pugh reached the world No. 1 doubles ranking in 1989.

== Career ==
Pugh was a member of the U.S. team that won the Davis Cup in 1990. Partnering with Rick Leach, he won the doubles rubbers in all four of the rounds which the U.S. played in that year and clinched the team's victory in the final with a win over Pat Cash and John Fitzgerald of Australia. Pugh has a 6–0 career record in Davis Cup play.

Pugh won 27 doubles titles (22 men's doubles and 5 mixed doubles). He also won one top-level singles title at Newport, Rhode Island in 1989, reaching a career-high singles ranking of world No. 37 in 1987. Pugh won his last career doubles title at Los Angeles in 1992. Pugh was inducted into the Intercollegiate Tennis Association (ITA) Hall of Fame in 2008.

== ATP career finals ==
=== Singles: 4 (1 title, 3 runner-ups) ===
Legend Grand Slam Tournaments (0–0) ATP World Tour Finals (0–0) ATP Masters 1000 (0–0) ATP 500 Series (0–0) ATP 250 Series (1–3)	Finals by surface Hard (0–2) Clay (0–0) Grass (1–0) Carpet (0–1)	Finals by setting Outdoors (1–3) Indoors (0–0)

Result	W–L	Date	Tournament	Tier	Surface	Opponent	Score
Loss	0–1	Jul 1987	Schenectady, United States	Grand Prix	Hard	(Peru) Jaime Yzaga	6–0, 6–7^{(4–7)}, 1–6
Loss	0–2	Oct 1987	San Francisco, United States	Grand Prix	Carpet	(Sweden) Peter Lundgren	1–6, 5–7
Win	1–2	Jul 1989	Newport, United States	Grand Prix	Grass	(Sweden) Peter Lundgren	6–4, 4–6, 6–2
Loss	1–3	Aug 1989	Stratton Mountain, United States	Grand Prix	Hard	(United States) Brad Gilbert	5–7, 0–6

=== Doubles: 37 (22 titles, 15 runner-ups) ===
Legend Grand Slam Tournaments (3–3) ATP World Tour Finals (1–0) ATP Masters 1000 (2–2) ATP Championship Series (2–1) ATP Grand Prix (14–9)	Finals by surface Hard (13–0) Clay (4–0) Grass (1–0) Carpet (4–0)	Finals by setting Outdoors (0–0) Indoors (0–0)

Result	W–L	Date	Tournament	Tier	Surface	Partner	Opponents	Score
Loss	0–1	May 1987	Hamburg, West Germany	Masters Series	Clay	(Switzerland) Claudio Mezzadri	(Czech Republic) Miloslav Mečíř (Czech Republic) Tomáš Šmíd	6–4, 6–7, 2–6
Win	1–1	May 1987	Munich, West Germany	Grand Prix	Clay	(United States) Blaine Willenborg	(Spain) Sergio Casal (Spain) Emilio Sánchez	7–6, 4–6, 6–4
Loss	1–2	Jul 1987	Schenectady, United States	Grand Prix	Hard	(United States) Brad Pearce	(United States) Gary Donnelly (South Africa) Gary Muller	6–7, 2–6
Win	2–2	Oct 1987	Scottsdale, United States	Grand Prix	Hard	(United States) Rick Leach	(United States) Dan Goldie (United States) Mel Purcell	6–3, 6–2
Win	3–2	Nov 1987	Hong Kong, British Hong Kong	Grand Prix	Hard	(Australia) Mark Kratzmann	(United States) Marty Davis (Australia) Brad Drewett	6–7, 6–4, 6–2
Loss	3–3	Nov 1987	Stockholm, Sweden	Grand Prix	Hard	(United States) Jim Grabb	(Sweden) Stefan Edberg (Sweden) Anders Järryd	3–6, 4–6
Win	4–3	Jan 1988	Melbourne, Australia	Grand Slam	Hard	(United States) Rick Leach	(United Kingdom) Jeremy Bates (Sweden) Peter Lundgren	6–3, 6–2, 6–3
Loss	4–4	May 1988	Hamburg, West Germany	Masters Series	Clay	(United States) Rick Leach	(Australia) Darren Cahill (Australia) Laurie Warder	4–6, 4–6
Win	5–4	May 1988	Munich, West Germany	Grand Prix	Clay	(United States) Rick Leach	(Argentina) Alberto Mancini (Argentina) Christian Miniussi	7–6, 6–1
Win	6–4	Jul 1988	Washington, United States	Grand Prix	Hard	(United States) Rick Leach	(Mexico) Jorge Lozano (United States) Todd Witsken	6–3, 6–7, 6–2
Win	7–4	Aug 1988	Indianapolis, United States	Grand Prix	Hard	(United States) Rick Leach	(United States) Ken Flach (United States) Robert Seguso	6–4, 6–3
Win	8–4	Aug 1988	Cincinnati, United States	Masters Series	Hard	(United States) Rick Leach	(United States) Jim Grabb (United States) Patrick McEnroe	6–2, 6–4
Loss	8–5	Sep 1988	New York, United States	Grand Slam	Hard	(United States) Rick Leach	(Spain) Sergio Casal (Spain) Emilio Sánchez	walkover
Loss	8–6	Oct 1988	Scottsdale, United States	Grand Prix	Hard	(United States) Rick Leach	(United States) Scott Davis (United States) Mel Purcell	4–6, 6–7
Win	9–6	Nov 1988	Detroit, United States	Grand Prix	Carpet	(United States) Rick Leach	(United States) Ken Flach (United States) Robert Seguso	6–4, 6–1
Win	10–6	Dec 1988	Masters Doubles, United Kingdom	ATP Finals	Carpet	(United States) Rick Leach	(Spain) Sergio Casal (Spain) Emilio Sánchez	6–4, 6–3, 2–6, 6–0
Win	11–6	Jan 1989	Melbourne, Australia	Grand Slam	Hard	(United States) Rick Leach	(Australia) Darren Cahill (Australia) Mark Kratzmann	6–4, 6–4, 6–4
Loss	11–7	Feb 1989	Philadelphia, United States	Championship Series	Carpet	(United States) Rick Leach	(United States) Paul Annacone (South Africa) Christo van Rensburg	3–6, 5–7
Win	12–7	Mar 1989	Scottsdale, United States	Grand Prix	Hard	(United States) Rick Leach	(United States) Paul Annacone (South Africa) Christo van Rensburg	6–7, 6–3, 6–2, 2–6, 6–4
Win	13–7	Apr 1989	Singapore, Singapore	Grand Prix	Hard	(United States) Rick Leach	(United States) Paul Chamberlin (Kenya) Paul Wekesa	6–3, 6–4
Win	14–7	May 1989	Forest Hills, United States	Grand Prix	Clay	(United States) Rick Leach	(United States) Jim Courier (United States) Pete Sampras	6–4, 6–2
Loss	14–8	Jul 1989	Wimbledon, United Kingdom	Grand Slam	Grass	(United States) Rick Leach	(Australia) John Fitzgerald (Sweden) Anders Järryd	6–3, 6–7, 4–6, 6–7
Loss	14–9	Nov 1989	Stockholm, Sweden	Grand Prix	Carpet	(United States) Rick Leach	(Mexico) Jorge Lozano (United States) Todd Witsken	3–6, 7–5, 3–6
Win	15–9	Nov 1989	Itaparica, Brazil	Grand Prix	Hard	(United States) Rick Leach	(Mexico) Jorge Lozano (United States) Todd Witsken	6–2, 7–6
Win	16–9	Feb 1990	Philadelphia, United States	Championship Series	Carpet	(United States) Rick Leach	(Canada) Grant Connell (Canada) Glenn Michibata	3–6, 6–4, 6–2
Win	17–9	Mar 1990	Miami, United States	Masters Series	Hard	(United States) Rick Leach	(Germany) Boris Becker (Brazil) Cássio Motta	6–4, 3–6, 6–3
Loss	17–10	May 1990	Bologna, Italy	World Series	Clay	(France) Jérôme Potier	(Argentina) Gustavo Luza (Germany) Udo Riglewski	6–7, 6–4, 1–6
Win	18–10	Jul 1990	Wimbledon, United Kingdom	Grand Slam	Grass	(United States) Rick Leach	(South Africa) Pieter Aldrich (South Africa) Danie Visser	7–6, 7–6, 7–6
Loss	18–11	Nov 1990	Wembley, United Kingdom	World Series	Carpet	(United States) Rick Leach	(United States) Jim Grabb (United States) Patrick McEnroe	6–7, 6–4, 3–6
Win	19–11	Feb 1991	Philadelphia, United States	Championship Series	Carpet	(United States) Rick Leach	(Germany) Udo Riglewski (Germany) Michael Stich	6–4, 6–4
Win	20–11	May 1991	Charlotte, United States	World Series	Clay	(United States) Rick Leach	(United States) Bret Garnett (United States) Greg Van Emburgh	6–3, 2–6, 6–3
Loss	20–12	Jun 1991	Paris, France	Grand Slam	Clay	(United States) Rick Leach	(Australia) John Fitzgerald (Sweden) Anders Järryd	0–6, 6–7
Win	21–12	Aug 1991	Los Angeles, United States	World Series	Hard	(Argentina) Javier Frana	(Canada) Bret Garnett (United States) Brad Pearce	7–5, 2–6, 6–4
Win	22–12	Aug 1992	Los Angeles, United States	World Series	Hard	(United States) Patrick Galbraith	(United States) Francisco Montana (United States) David Wheaton	7–6, 7–6
Loss	22–13	Jul 1993	Newport, United States	World Series	Grass	(Zimbabwe) Byron Black	(Argentina) Javier Frana (South Africa) Christo van Rensburg	6–4, 1–6, 6–7
Loss	22–14	Jan 1994	Jakarta, Indonesia	World Series	Hard	(Mexico) Jorge Lozano	(Sweden) Jonas Björkman (Australia) Neil Borwick	4–6, 1–6
Loss	22–15	May 1994	Atlanta, United States	World Series	Clay	(United States) Francisco Montana	(United States) Jared Palmer (United States) Richey Reneberg	6–4, 6–7, 4–6

== ATP Challenger and ITF Futures finals ==
=== Singles: 2 (0–2) ===
Legend ATP Challenger (0–2) ITF Futures (0–0)	Finals by surface Hard (0–2) Clay (0–0) Grass (0–0) Carpet (0–0)

Result	W–L	Date	Tournament	Tier	Surface	Opponent	Score
Loss	0–1	Mar 1987	Cherbourg, France	Challenger	Hard	(Sweden) Stefan Eriksson	3–6, 0–6
Loss	0–2	Sep 1995	Aruba, Aruba	Challenger	Hard	(United States) Chris Woodruff	4–6, 2–6

=== Doubles: 6 (4–2) ===
Legend ATP Challenger (4–2) ITF Futures (0–0)	Finals by surface Hard (2–1) Clay (1–0) Grass (0–0) Carpet (1–1)

Result	W–L	Date	Tournament	Tier	Surface	Partner	Opponents	Score
Loss	0–1	Mar 1987	Cherbourg, France	Challenger	Hard	(France) Eric Winogradsky	(United States) Paul Chamberlin (United States) Leif Shiras	5–7, 5–7
Win	1–1	Sep 1992	Fairfield, United States	Challenger	Hard	(United States) Jared Palmer	(United States) Steve Devries (United States) Ted Scherman	6–4, 7–6
Win	2–1	Oct 1992	Ponte Vedra, United States	Challenger	Hard	(United States) Jared Palmer	(Venezuela) Nicolas Pereira (Czech Republic) Daniel Vacek	1–6, 6–3, 6–2
Win	3–1	Dec 1993	Naples, United States	Challenger	Clay	(United States) Francisco Montana	(The Bahamas) Mark Knowles (United States) Jared Palmer	7–6, 3–6, 6–4
Loss	3–2	Feb 1996	Wolfsburg, Germany	Challenger	Carpet	(Netherlands) Joost Winnink	(Germany) Dirk Dier (Germany) Arne Thoms	4–6, 4–6
Win	4–2	Feb 1996	Lübeck, Germany	Challenger	Carpet	(Netherlands) Joost Winnink	(Switzerland) Lorenzo Manta (Germany) Lars Rehmann	7–5, 7–5

== Performance timelines ==
Key
W	F	SF	QF	#R	RR	Q#	DNQ	A	NH

(W) winner; (F) finalist; (SF) semifinalist; (QF) quarterfinalist; (#R) rounds 4, 3, 2, 1; (RR) round-robin stage; (Q#) qualification round; (DNQ) did not qualify; (A) absent; (NH) not held; (SR) strike rate (events won / competed); (W–L) win–loss record.

=== Singles ===
Tournament	1985	1986	1987	1988	1989	1990	1991	SR	W–L	Win %
Grand Slam tournaments
Australian Open	A	A	A	2R	1R	1R	1R	0 / 4	1–4	20%
French Open	A	A	3R	2R	1R	2R	A	0 / 4	4–4	50%
Wimbledon	Q1	Q2	1R	1R	3R	2R	1R	0 / 5	3–5	38%
US Open	A	1R	3R	1R	1R	2R	1R	0 / 6	3–6	33%
Win–loss	0–0	0–1	4–3	2–4	2–4	3–4	0–3	0 / 19	11–19	37%
ATP Masters Series
Indian Wells	A	A	A	1R	1R	3R	A	0 / 3	2–3	40%
Miami	A	A	1R	1R	2R	2R	A	0 / 4	2–4	33%
Monte Carlo	A	A	A	1R	A	A	A	0 / 1	0–1	0%
Rome	A	A	2R	3R	A	1R	A	0 / 3	3–3	50%
Hamburg	A	A	1R	2R	A	A	A	0 / 2	1–2	33%
Canada	A	A	2R	1R	A	A	A	0 / 2	1–2	33%
Cincinnati	A	A	2R	1R	A	2R	A	0 / 3	2–3	40%
Paris	A	A	A	1R	A	A	A	0 / 1	0–1	0%
Win–loss	0–0	0–0	3–5	3–8	1–2	4–4	0–0	0 / 19	11–19	37%

=== Doubles ===
Tournament	1985	1986	1987	1988	1989	1990	1991	1992	1993	1994	1995	SR	W–L	Win %
Grand Slam tournaments
Australian Open	A	NH	A	W	W	SF	3R	1R	A	1R	1R	2 / 7	18–5	78%
French Open	A	2R	1R	QF	1R	3R	F	QF	1R	1R	A	0 / 9	14–9	61%
Wimbledon	Q1	1R	1R	3R	F	W	1R	1R	2R	2R	A	1 / 9	15–8	65%
US Open	A	1R	3R	F	QF	1R	2R	1R	1R	1R	A	0 / 9	11–9	55%
Win–loss	0–0	1–3	2–3	16–3	14–3	12–3	8–4	3–4	1–3	1–4	0–1	3 / 34	58–31	65%
ATP Masters Series
Indian Wells	A	A	A	1R	A	SF	2R	SF	2R	1R	A	0 / 6	6–6	50%
Miami	A	1R	1R	2R	1R	W	3R	QF	2R	QF	2R	1 / 10	15–9	63%
Monte Carlo	A	A	2R	QF	A	A	A	A	1R	A	A	0 / 3	2–3	40%
Rome	A	A	1R	1R	A	1R	A	2R	1R	2R	A	0 / 6	2–6	25%
Hamburg	A	A	F	A	A	A	A	2R	2R	1R	A	0 / 4	6–4	60%
Canada	A	A	1R	2R	A	A	A	1R	2R	2R	A	0 / 5	2–5	29%
Cincinnati	A	2R	1R	W	A	SF	QF	1R	A	1R	A	1 / 7	10–6	63%
Paris	A	A	A	2R	2R	2R	A	A	A	2R	A	0 / 4	3–4	43%
Win–loss	0–0	1–2	5–6	8–6	1–2	9–4	3–3	8–6	4–6	6–7	1–1	2 / 45	46–43	52%
Year-end ranking	245	134	32	6	2	3	30	68	85	77	229			

=== Mixed doubles ===
Tournament	1987	1988	1989	1990	1991	1992	1993	1994	SR	W–L	Win %
Grand Slam tournaments
Australian Open	A	W	W	W	QF	QF	A	A	3 / 5	19–2	90%
French Open	A	QF	A	A	A	A	A	3R	0 / 2	4–2	67%
Wimbledon	1R	2R	W	SF	F	3R	1R	1R	1 / 8	18–7	72%
US Open	QF	W	2R	F	1R	1R	1R	1R	1 / 8	12–7	63%
Win–loss	2–2	13–2	12–1	13–2	7–3	4–3	0–2	2–3	5 / 23	53–18	75%
