= 1988 Paris Open =

- Date: 24–31 October
- Edition: 16th
- Draw: 32S / 16D
- Prize money: $810,000
- Surface: Carpet / indoor
- Location: Paris, France
- Venue: Palais omnisports de Paris-Bercy

Champions

Singles
- (Israel) Amos Mansdorf

Doubles
- (United States) Paul Annacone / (Australia) John Fitzgerald
← 1987 ·	Paris Masters	· 1989 →

The 1988 Paris Open was a Grand Prix men's tennis tournament played on indoor carpet courts. It was the 16th edition of the Paris Open (later known as the Paris Masters). It took place at the Palais omnisports de Paris-Bercy in Paris, France from 24 October through 31 October 1988. Unseeded Amos Mansdorf won the singles title.

== Finals ==
=== Singles ===
(Israel) Amos Mansdorf defeated (United States) Brad Gilbert 6–3, 6–2, 6–3

- It was Mansdorf's 2nd title of the year and the 4th of his career.

=== Doubles ===
(United States) Paul Annacone / (Australia) John Fitzgerald defeated (United States) Jim Grabb / (South Africa) Christo van Rensburg 6–2, 6–2

- It was Annacone's only title of the year and the 11th of his career. It was Fitzgerald's 5th title of the year and the 22nd of his career.
