= Wally Masur =

Australian tennis player and coach (born 1963)

- Country (sports): Australia
- Residence: Sydney, Australia
- Born: 13 May 1963 (age 63) Southampton, England, United Kingdom
- Height: 180 cm (5 ft 11 in)
- Turned pro: 1982
- Retired: 1995
- Plays: Right-handed (one-handed backhand)
- Prize money: $3,134,718

Singles
- Career record: 327–285
- Career titles: 3
- Highest ranking: No. 15 (11 October 1993)

Grand Slam singles results
- Australian Open: SF (1987)
- French Open: 3R (1991)
- Wimbledon: 4R (1988, 1992, 1993)
- US Open: SF (1993)

Other tournaments
- Grand Slam Cup: 1R (1992, 1993)
- Olympic Games: 2R (1988)

Doubles
- Career record: 285–211
- Career titles: 16
- Highest ranking: No. 8 (12 April 1993)

Grand Slam doubles results
- Australian Open: SF (1993)
- French Open: SF (1988, 1992)
- Wimbledon: QF (1988, 1992)
- US Open: 2R (1984, 1987, 1988, 1989, 1990, 1992, 1993)

Wally Masur (/məˈsʊər/; born 13 May 1963) is a tennis coach, television commentator, and former professional tennis player from Sydney, Australia. He reached the semifinals of the 1987 Australian Open and the 1993 US Open, achieving a career-high singles ranking of world No. 15 in October 1993.

== Tennis career ==
=== Juniors ===
Masur began playing tennis at the age of eight. In 1980, he reached the final of the Australian Open boys' singles tournament and won the boys' doubles title.

=== Pro tour ===
Masur turned professional in 1982. He was an Australian Institute of Sport scholarship holder.

In 1983, Masur won his first top-level singles title at Hong Kong, and his first tour doubles title at Taipei. He also reached quarterfinals of that year's Australian Open, before being knocked out by John McEnroe.

In 1987, Masur won his second career singles title at Adelaide and reached the Australian Open semifinals, where he lost to eventual champion Stefan Edberg.

Masur won his third singles title in 1988 at Newport, Rhode Island.

In 1990, Masur helped Australia reach the final of the Davis Cup, compiling a 6–0 record in singles rubbers in the first round, quarterfinals and semifinals. However he was left out of the team that played the United States in the final by captain Neale Fraser. The decision to leave Masur out of the final was fairly controversial at the time given the very significant role that he had played in getting Australia there, but was principally because the final was to be played on clay courts, which was not Masur's best surface. The US team beat Australia 3–2 in the final.

1993 was the best year of Masur's career. He reached the semifinals of that year's US Open, where he lost to Cédric Pioline. He also reached his career-high rankings in both singles (world No. 15) and doubles (No. 8) that year. He captured doubles titles in Milan and Stuttgart that year, which proved to be the final top-level titles of his career.

Masur retired from the professional tour in 1995, having won three singles titles and 16 doubles titles.

=== Post playing ===
In January 2015, Masur was appointed captain of Australia's Davis Cup team, succeeding Pat Rafter. He was succeeded by Lleyton Hewitt in 2016.

== ATP career finals ==
=== Singles: 11 (3 titles / 8 runner-ups) ===
Legend Grand Slam Tournaments (0–0) ATP World Tour Finals (0–0) ATP Masters 1000 Series (0–0) ATP 500 Series (0–0) ATP 250 Series (3–8)	Finals by surface Hard (2–4) Clay (0–0) Grass (1–2) Carpet (0–2)	Finals by setting Outdoors (3–5) Indoors (0–3)

Result	W–L	Date	Tournament	Tier	Surface	Opponent	Score
Win	1–0	Nov 1983	Hong Kong, Hong Kong	Grand Prix	Hard	(United States) Sammy Giammalva Jr.	6–1, 6–1
Loss	1–1	Nov 1984	Taipei, Taiwan	Grand Prix	Carpet	(United States) Brad Gilbert	3–6, 3–6
Loss	1–2	Jan 1985	Auckland, New Zealand	Grand Prix	Hard	(New Zealand) Chris Lewis	7–5, 6–0, 2–6, 6–4
Win	2–2	Jan 1987	Adelaide, Australia	Grand Prix	Hard	(United States) Bill Scanlon	6–4, 7–6^{(7–2)}
Loss	2–3	Mar 1987	Nancy, France	Grand Prix	Carpet	(Australia) Pat Cash	2–6, 3–6
Loss	2–4	Jan 1988	Adelaide, Australia	Grand Prix	Hard	(Australia) Mark Woodforde	2–6, 4–6
Win	3–4	Jul 1988	Newport, US	Grand Prix	Grass	(Australia) Brad Drewett	6–2, 6–1
Loss	3–5	Mar 1990	Memphis, US	World Series	Hard	(Germany) Michael Stich	7–6^{(7–5)}, 4–6, 6–7^{(1–7)}
Loss	3–6	Apr 1991	Hong Kong, Hong Kong	World Series	Hard	(Netherlands) Richard Krajicek	2–6, 6–3, 3–6
Loss	3–7	Jun 1993	Rosmalen, Netherlands	World Series	Grass	(France) Arnaud Boetsch	6–3, 3–6, 3–6
Loss	3–8	Jun 1993	Manchester, United Kingdom	World Series	Grass	(Australia) Jason Stoltenberg	1–6, 3–6

=== Doubles: 24 (16 titles / 8 runner-ups) ===
Result	W-L	Date	Tournament	Surface	Partner	Opponents	Score
Win	1–0	Nov 1983	Taipei, Taiwan	Carpet (i)	(Australia) Kim Warwick	(United States) Ken Flach (United States) Robert Seguso	7–6, 6–4
Loss	1–1	Apr 1984	Aix-en-Provence, France	Clay	(New Zealand) Chris Lewis	(Australia) Pat Cash (Australia) Paul McNamee	4–6, 6–3, 6–4
Loss	1–2	Oct 1984	Brisbane, Australia	Carpet (i)	(Australia) Broderick Dyke	(Paraguay) Francisco González (United States) Matt Mitchell	6–7, 6–2, 7–5
Win	2–2	Oct 1984	Melbourne Indoor, Australia	Carpet (i)	(Australia) Broderick Dyke	(Australia) Peter Johnston (Australia) John McCurdy	6–3, 6–2
Win	3–2	Dec 1984	Adelaide, Australia	Hard	(Australia) Broderick Dyke	(Australia) Peter Doohan (South Africa) Brian Levine	4–6, 7–5, 6–1
Win	4–2	Dec 1984	Melbourne Outdoor, Australia	Grass	(Australia) Broderick Dyke	(United States) Mike Bauer (United States) Scott McCain	6–7, 6–3, 7–6
Loss	4–3	Jan 1985	Auckland, New Zealand	Hard	(Australia) Broderick Dyke	(New Zealand) Chris Lewis (Australia) John Fitzgerald	7–6, 6–2
Loss	4–4	Mar 1985	Milan Indoor, Italy	Carpet (i)	(Australia) Broderick Dyke	(Switzerland) Heinz Günthardt (Sweden) Anders Järryd	6–2, 6–1
Loss	4–5	Oct 1985	Sydney, Australia	Grass	(Australia) Broderick Dyke	(Australia) David Dowlen (Nigeria) Nduka Odizor	6–4, 7–6
Win	5–5	Jan 1986	Auckland, New Zealand	Hard	(Australia) Broderick Dyke	(United States) Karl Richter (United States) Rick Rudeen	6–3, 6–4
Loss	5–6	May 1986	Munich, West Germany	Clay	(Australia) Broderick Dyke	(Spain) Sergio Casal (Spain) Emilio Sánchez	6–3, 4–6, 6–4
Loss	5–7	Jun 1986	Bristol, Australia	Grass	(Australia) Mark Edmondson	(Australia) Christo Steyn (South Africa) Danie Visser	6–7, 7–6, 12–10
Win	6–7	Jul 1986	Livingston, US	Hard	(United States) Bob Green	(United States) Sammy Giammalva Jr. (United States) Greg Holmes	5–7, 6–4, 6–4
Loss	6–8	Oct 1987	Brisbane, Australia	Hard (i)	(Australia) Broderick Dyke	(United States) Matt Anger (New Zealand) Kelly Evernden	7–6, 6–2
Win	7–8	Nov 1988	Brussels Indoor, Belgium	Carpet (i)	(Netherlands) Tom Nijssen	(Australia) John Fitzgerald (Czechoslovakia) Tomáš Šmíd	7–5, 7–6
Win	8–8	Jan 1989	Sydney, Australia	Hard	(Australia) Darren Cahill	(South Africa) Pieter Aldrich (South Africa) Danie Visser	6–4, 6–3
Win	9–8	Aug 1989	Stratton Mountain, US	Hard	(Australia) Mark Kratzmann	(South Africa) Pieter Aldrich (South Africa) Danie Visser	6–3, 4–6, 7–6
Win	10–8	Apr 1990	Tokyo, Japan	Hard	(Australia) Mark Kratzmann	(United States) Kent Kinnear (United States) Brad Pearce	6–4, 6–3
Win	11–8	Apr 1990	Hong Kong, UK	Hard	(Australia) Pat Cash	(United States) Kevin Curren (United States) Joey Rive	6–3, 6–3
Win	12–8	Feb 1991	San Francisco, US	Hard (i)	(Australia) Jason Stoltenberg	(Sweden) Ronnie Båthman (Sweden) Rikard Bergh	4–6, 7–6, 6–4
Win	13–8	Jul 1991	Stuttgart, Germany	Clay	(Spain) Emilio Sánchez	(Italy) Omar Camporese (Croatia) Goran Ivanišević	2–6, 6–3, 6–4
Win	14–8	Aug 1991	New Haven, US	Hard	(Czechoslovakia) Petr Korda	(United States) Jeff Brown (United States) Scott Melville	7–5, 6–3
Win	15–8	Feb 1993	Milan Indoor, Italy	Carpet (i)	(Australia) Mark Kratzmann	(Netherlands) Tom Nijssen (Czech Republic) Cyril Suk	4–6, 6–3, 6–4
Win	16–8	Feb 1993	Stuttgart Indoor, Germany	Hard (i)	(Australia) Mark Kratzmann	(United States) Steve DeVries (Australia) David Macpherson	6–3, 7–6

== Performance timelines ==
Key
W	F	SF	QF	#R	RR	Q#	DNQ	A	NH

(W) winner; (F) finalist; (SF) semifinalist; (QF) quarterfinalist; (#R) rounds 4, 3, 2, 1; (RR) round-robin stage; (Q#) qualification round; (DNQ) did not qualify; (A) absent; (NH) not held; (SR) strike rate (events won / competed); (W–L) win–loss record.

=== Singles ===
Tournament	1980	1981	1982	1983	1984	1985	1986	1987	1988	1989	1990	1991	1992	1993	1994	1995	SR	W–L	Win %
Grand Slam tournaments
Australian Open	Q2	1R	4R	QF	2R	4R	NH	SF	4R	3R	3R	2R	4R	1R	1R	2R	0 / 14	28–14	67%
French Open	A	A	A	2R	1R	1R	1R	1R	1R	A	A	3R	2R	1R	1R	A	0 / 10	4–10	29%
Wimbledon	Q1	Q2	A	2R	3R	2R	3R	2R	4R	3R	2R	2R	4R	4R	2R	1R	0 / 13	21–13	62%
US Open	A	A	A	A	1R	1R	2R	A	2R	2R	1R	3R	3R	SF	1R	A	0 / 10	12–10	55%
Win–loss	0–0	0–1	3–1	6–3	3–4	4–4	3–3	6–3	7–4	5–3	3–3	6–4	9–4	8–4	1–4	1–2	0 / 47	65–47	58%
National Representation
Summer Olympics	A	Not Held			A	Not Held			2R	Not Held			A	Not Held			0 / 1	1–1	50%
ATP Masters Series
Indian Wells	A	A	A	A	A	A	A	A	A	1R	1R	1R	1R	1R	1R	Q1	0 / 6	0–6	0%
Miami	A	A	A	A	A	A	A	3R	1R	A	A	A	4R	A	A	A	0 / 3	5–3	63%
Monte Carlo	A	A	A	A	A	1R	A	A	A	A	A	A	A	A	A	A	0 / 1	0–1	0%
Hamburg	A	A	A	A	2R	1R	A	A	A	A	A	A	A	A	A	A	0 / 2	1–2	33%
Rome	A	A	A	1R	A	1R	A	A	A	A	A	A	A	A	A	A	0 / 2	0–2	0%
Canada	A	A	1R	A	A	2R	A	3R	2R	A	A	3R	SF	1R	2R	A	0 / 8	11–8	58%
Cincinnati	A	A	A	A	1R	1R	1R	3R	2R	1R	A	2R	1R	2R	1R	Q1	0 / 10	5–10	33%
Paris	A	A	A	A	A	A	A	1R	A	QF	1R	2R	3R	2R	A	A	0 / 6	5–6	45%
Win–loss	0–0	0–0	0–1	0–1	1–2	1–5	0–1	6–4	2–3	2–3	0–2	4–4	9–5	1–4	1–3	0–0	0 / 38	27–38	42%

=== Doubles ===
Tournament	1981	1982	1983	1984	1985	1986	1987	1988	1989	1990	1991	1992	1993	1994	1995	SR	W–L	Win %
Grand Slam tournaments
Australian Open	A	2R	2R	QF	A	A	QF	1R	QF	3R	QF	2R	SF	2R	1R	0 / 12	19–12	61%
French Open	A	A	A	2R	1R	3R	2R	SF	A	A	1R	SF	QF	QF	A	0 / 9	18–9	67%
Wimbledon	Q2	A	A	3R	1R	3R	1R	QF	2R	3R	1R	QF	2R	2R	A	0 / 11	15–11	58%
US Open	A	A	A	2R	1R	1R	2R	2R	2R	2R	1R	2R	2R	A	A	0 / 10	7–10	41%
Win–loss	0–0	0–1	1–1	6–4	0–3	4–3	4–4	8–4	5–3	5–3	3–4	9–4	9–4	5–3	0–1	0 / 42	59–42	58%
Year-End Championships
ATP Finals	Did not qualify											SF	RR	DNQ		0 / 2	3–4	43%
ATP Masters Series
Indian Wells	A	A	A	A	A	A	A	A	2R	2R	1R	1R	SF	2R	A	0 / 6	5–6	45%
Miami	A	A	A	A	A	A	1R	1R	A	A	A	QF	A	A	A	0 / 3	3–3	50%
Monte Carlo	A	A	A	A	SF	1R	A	SF	A	A	A	A	A	A	A	0 / 3	5–3	63%
Hamburg	A	A	A	2R	1R	A	A	A	A	A	A	A	A	A	A	0 / 2	1–2	33%
Rome	A	A	A	A	2R	1R	A	SF	A	A	A	A	A	A	A	0 / 3	4–3	57%
Canada	A	A	A	A	2R	1R	2R	SF	A	A	SF	SF	A	1R	A	0 / 7	10–7	59%
Cincinnati	A	A	A	QF	QF	2R	2R	2R	2R	A	2R	1R	2R	A	A	0 / 9	9–9	50%
Paris	A	A	A	A	A	A	A	A	A	QF	1R	QF	2R	A	A	0 / 4	3–4	43%
Win–loss	0–0	0–0	0–0	3–2	6–5	1–4	2–3	10–5	2–2	3–2	4–4	6–5	2–3	1–2	0–0	0 / 37	40–37	52%

== Junior Grand Slam finals ==
=== Singles: 1 (1 runner-up) ===
Result	Year	Tournament	Surface	Opponent	Score
Loss	1980	Australian Open	Hard	(Australia) Craig A. Miller	6–7, 2–6

=== Doubles: 1 (1 title) ===
Result	Year	Tournament	Surface	Partner	Opponents	Score
Win	1980	Australian Open	Hard	(Australia) Craig A. Miller		
