= 1990 Paris Open – Doubles =

Doubles
- 1990 Paris Open
- 1989 Champions: (Australia) John Fitzgerald (Sweden) Anders Järryd

Final
- Champions: (United States) Scott Davis (United States) David Pate
- Runners-up: (Australia) Darren Cahill (Australia) Mark Kratzmann
- Score: 5–7, 6–3, 6–4

Details
- Draw: 24
- Seeds: 8

Events
Singles	Doubles
← 1989 ·	Paris Open	· 1991 →

== Seeds ==
Champion seeds are indicated in bold text while text in italics indicates the round in which those seeds were eliminated. All eight seeded teams received byes to the second round.

1. (South Africa) Pieter Aldrich / (South Africa) Danie Visser (second round)
2. (United States) Rick Leach / (United States) Jim Pugh (second round)
3. (France) Guy Forget / (Switzerland) Jakob Hlasek (quarterfinals)
4. (Spain) Sergio Casal / (Spain) Emilio Sánchez (second round)
5. (Canada) Grant Connell / (Canada) Glenn Michibata (second round)
6. (United States) **Scott Davis** / (United States) **David Pate (champions)**
7. (Mexico) Jorge Lozano / (United States) Todd Witsken (semifinals)
8. (Australia) Darren Cahill / (Australia) Mark Kratzmann (final)

== Draw ==
=== Key ===
- Q = Qualifier
- WC = Wild card
- LL = Lucky loser
- Alt = Alternate
- SE = Special exempt
- PR = Protected ranking
- ITF = ITF entry
- JE = Junior exempt
- w/o = Walkover
- r = Retired
- d = Defaulted
- SR = Special ranking

=== Finals ===
Final
6	(United States) **Scott Davis** (United States) **David Pate**	5	**6**	**6**
8	(Australia) Darren Cahill (Australia) Mark Kratzmann	**7**	3	4

=== Top half ===
First round
(Germany) B Becker (Australia) J Fitzgerald	2	4
(United States) **J Grabb** (United States) **P McEnroe**	**6**	**6**
(Australia) B Dyke (Sweden) P Lundgren	1	4
LL	(United States) **G Layendecker** (Italy) **D Nargiso**	**6**	**6**
(Australia) **W Masur** (Australia) **T Woodbridge**	**7**	**6**
(Socialist Federal Republic of Yugoslavia) G Ivanišević (Czechoslovakia) P Korda	6	2
(United States) **J Courier** (Australia) **D Macpherson**	**6**	**6**
(United States) R Reneberg (Spain) J Sánchez	3	0

Second round
1	(South Africa) P Aldrich (South Africa) D Visser	**6**	3	4
(United States) **J Grabb** (United States) **P McEnroe**	4	**6**	**6**
LL	(United States) G Layendecker (Italy) D Nargiso	6	3
7	(Mexico) **J Lozano** (United States) **T Witsken**	**7**	**6**
4	(Spain) S Casal (Spain) E Sánchez	1	**7**	6
(Australia) **W Masur** (Australia) **T Woodbridge**	**6**	6	**7**
(United States) J Courier (Australia) D Macpherson	**7**	6	6
6	(United States) **S Davis** (United States) **D Pate**	6	**7**	**7**

Quarterfinals
(United States) J Grabb (United States) P McEnroe	4	**7**	2
7	(Mexico) **J Lozano** (United States) **T Witsken**	**6**	5	**6**
(Australia) W Masur (Australia) T Woodbridge	5	2
6	(United States) **S Davis** (United States) **D Pate**	**7**	**6**

Semifinals
7	(Mexico) J Lozano (United States) T Witsken	4	5
6	(United States) **S Davis** (United States) **D Pate**	**6**	**7**

=== Bottom half ===
First round
(United Kingdom) **N Broad** (South Africa) **G Muller**	**6**	**7**
Q	(Czechoslovakia) K Nováček (Belgium) L Pimek	3	6
(United States) **P Galbraith** (United States) **K Jones**	**6**	**6**
(United States) K Curren (South Africa) C van Rensburg	3	4
(South Africa) S Kruger (Czechoslovakia) T Šmíd	**6**	4	3
(Germany) **U Riglewski** (Germany) **M Stich**	3	**6**	**6**
WC	(Iran) **M Bahrami** (France) **É Winogradsky**	4	**7**	**7**
(United States) P Annacone (United States) D Wheaton	**6**	6	6

Second round
5	(Canada) G Connell (Canada) G Michibata	5	**7**	4
(United Kingdom) **N Broad** (South Africa) **G Muller**	**7**	6	**6**
(United States) P Galbraith (United States) K Jones	3	4
3	(France) **G Forget** (Switzerland) **J Hlasek**	**6**	**6**
8	(Australia) **D Cahill** (Australia) **M Kratzmann**	**7**	**7**
(Germany) U Riglewski (Germany) M Stich	6	6
WC	(Iran) **M Bahrami** (France) **É Winogradsky**	**7**	**7**
2	(United States) R Leach (United States) J Pugh	6	6

Quarterfinals
(United Kingdom) **N Broad** (South Africa) **G Muller**	**6**	3	**6**
3	(France) G Forget (Switzerland) J Hlasek	3	**6**	2
8	(Australia) **D Cahill** (Australia) **M Kratzmann**	**6**	**6**
WC	(Iran) M Bahrami (France) É Winogradsky	3	4

Semifinals
(United Kingdom) N Broad (South Africa) G Muller	3	2
8	(Australia) **D Cahill** (Australia) **M Kratzmann**	**6**	**6**
