= Christo van Rensburg =

South African tennis player

- Country (sports): /South Africa
- Residence: Austin, Texas, United States
- Born: 23 October 1962 (age 63) Uitenhage, South Africa
- Height: 1.86 m (6 ft 1 in)
- Turned pro: 1983
- Retired: 1997
- Plays: Right-handed (one-handed backhand)
- Prize money: $1,907,831

Singles
- Career record: 166–160
- Career titles: 2
- Highest ranking: No. 19 (29 February 1988)

Grand Slam singles results
- Australian Open: 4R (1989)
- Wimbledon: 4R (1986, 1989)
- US Open: 4R (1990)

Other tournaments
- Olympic Games: 1R (1992)

Doubles
- Career record: 293–216
- Career titles: 20
- Highest ranking: No. 5 (4 May 1987)

Grand Slam doubles results
- Australian Open: W (1985)
- French Open: QF (1985)
- Wimbledon: SF (1986)
- US Open: SF (1989)

Other doubles tournaments
- Tour Finals: SF (1985)

Grand Slam mixed doubles results
- Australian Open: 1R (1990, 1997)
- French Open: 2R (1996)
- Wimbledon: SF (1991, 1996)
- US Open: SF (1991, 1996)

Christo van Rensburg (born 23 October 1962) is a former professional tennis player from South Africa.

Van Rensburg turned professional in 1983. He won his first doubles title on ATP Tour later that year at Cleveland.

Van Rensburg won 20 top-level doubles titles during his career, including one Grand Slam men's doubles title at the Australian Open in 1985, partnering Paul Annacone. He also won two ATP singles titles at Orlando in 1987, and at Johannesburg in 1989. Van Rensburg's career-high rankings were world No. 19 in singles (achieved in 1988) and world No. 5 in doubles (achieved in 1987). He retired from the professional tour in 1995.

Van Rensburg is one of only two men to beat Pete Sampras in straight sets at Wimbledon (doing so in 1990, where Sampras was the No. 12 seed), the other being 1996 champion Richard Krajicek.

== ATP career finals ==
=== Singles: 6 (2 titles / 4 runner-ups) ===
| Legend Grand Slam Tournaments (0–0) ATP World Tour Finals (0–0) ATP Masters Series (0–0) ATP Championship Series (0–0) ATP World Series (2–4) | Finals by surface Hard (2–3) Clay (0–0) Grass (0–1) Carpet (0–0) | Finals by setting Outdoors (1–3) Indoors (1–1) |

| Result | W–L | Date | Tournament | Tier | Surface | Opponent | Score |
|---|---|---|---|---|---|---|---|
| Win | 1–0 | Mar 1987 | Orlando, United States | Grand Prix | Hard | (United States) Jimmy Connors | 6–3, 3–6, 6–1 |
| Loss | 1–1 | Nov 1988 | Johannesburg, South Africa | Grand Prix | Hard | (Switzerland) Jakob Hlasek | 7–6^{(7–1)}, 4–6, 1–6, 6–7^{(4–7)} |
| Loss | 1–2 | Jun 1989 | Queen's, United Kingdom | Grand Prix | Grass | (Czech Republic) Ivan Lendl | 6–4, 3–6, 4–6 |
| Win | 2–2 | Nov 1989 | Johannesburg, South Africa | Grand Prix | Hard | (United States) Paul Chamberlin | 6–4, 7–6, 6–1 |
| Loss | 2–3 | Apr 1990 | Orlando, United States | World Series | Hard | (United States) Brad Gilbert | 2–6, 1–6 |
| Loss | 2–4 | Oct 1991 | Tel Aviv, Israel | World Series | Hard | (Mexico) Leonardo Lavalle | 2–6, 6–3, 3–6 |

=== Doubles: 32 (20 titles / 12 runners-up) ===
| Legend Grand Slam Tournaments (1–0) ATP World Tour Finals (0–1) ATP Masters Series (2–1) ATP Championship Series (0–0) ATP World Series (17–10) | Finals by surface Hard (9–6) Clay (4–0) Grass (3–1) Carpet (4–5) | Finals by setting Outdoors (16–8) Indoors (4–4) |

| Result | W–L | Date | Tournament | Tier | Surface | Partner | Opponents | Score |
|---|---|---|---|---|---|---|---|---|
| Win | 1–0 | Aug 1983 | Cleveland, United States | Grand Prix | Hard | (South Africa) Mike Myburg | (Paraguay) Francisco González (South Africa) Matt Mitchell | 7–6, 7–5 |
| Win | 2–0 | Dec 1984 | Sydney, Australia | Grand Prix | Grass | (United States) Paul Annacone | (United States) Tom Gullikson (South Africa) Scott McCain | 7–6, 7–6 |
| Win | 3–0 | Apr 1985 | Delray Beach, United States | Grand Prix Masters | Hard | (United States) Paul Annacone | (United States) Sherwood Stewart (Australia) Kim Warwick | 7–5, 7–5, 6–4 |
| Win | 4–0 | Apr 1985 | Atlanta, United States | WCT | Carpet | (United States) Paul Annacone | (United States) Steve Denton (Czechoslovakia) Tomáš Šmíd | 6–4, 6–3 |
| Loss | 4–1 | May 1985 | Las Vegas, United States | Grand Prix | Hard | (United States) Paul Annacone | (Australia) Pat Cash (Australia) John Fitzgerald | 6–7, 7–6, 6–7 |
| Loss | 4–2 | Jul 1985 | Newport, United States | Grand Prix | Grass | (United States) Paul Annacone | (Australia) Peter Doohan (United States) Sammy Giammalva Jr. | 1–6, 3–6 |
| Loss | 4–3 | Sep 1985 | Los Angeles, United States | Grand Prix | Hard | (United States) Paul Annacone | (United States) Scott Davis (United States) Robert Van't Hof | 3–6, 6–7 |
| Win | 5–3 | Sep 1985 | San Francisco, United States | Grand Prix | Carpet | (United States) Paul Annacone | (United States) Brad Gilbert (United States) Sandy Mayer | 3–6, 6–3, 6–4 |
| Win | 6–3 | Oct 1985 | Johannesburg, South Africa | Grand Prix | Hard | (United Kingdom) Colin Dowdeswell | (Israel) Amos Mansdorf (Israel) Shahar Perkiss | 3–6, 7–6, 6–4 |
| Win | 7–3 | Dec 1985 | Melbourne, Australia | Grand Slam | Grass | (United States) Paul Annacone | (Australia) Mark Edmondson (Australia) Kim Warwick | 3–6, 7–6, 6–4, 6–4 |
| Loss | 7–4 | Jan 1985 | London, United Kingdom | WCT | Carpet | (United States) Paul Annacone | (Switzerland) Heinz Günthardt (Hungary) Balázs Taróczy | 4–6, 6–1, 6–7, 7–6, 4–6 |
| Loss | 7–5 | Aug 1986 | Stratton Mountain, United States | Grand Prix | Hard | (United States) Paul Annacone | (United States) Peter Fleming (United States) John McEnroe | 3–6, 6–3, 3–6 |
| Win | 8–5 | Nov 1986 | Johannesburg, South Africa | Grand Prix | Hard | (United States) Mike De Palmer | (Ecuador) Andrés Gómez (United States) Sherwood Stewart | 3–6, 6–2, 7–6 |
| Win | 9–5 | Mar 1987 | Miami, United States | Grand Prix Masters | Hard | (United States) Paul Annacone | (United States) Ken Flach (United States) Robert Seguso | 6–2, 6–4, 6–4 |
| Loss | 9–6 | Mar 1987 | Orlando, United States | Grand Prix | Hard | (United States) Paul Annacone | (United States) Sherwood Stewart (Australia) Kim Warwick | 6–2, 6–7, 4–6 |
| Win | 10–6 | Apr 1987 | Chicago, United States | Grand Prix | Carpet | (United States) Paul Annacone | (United States) Mike De Palmer (United States) Gary Donnelly | 6–3, 7–6^{(7–4)} |
| Loss | 10–7 | Oct 1988 | Paris, France | Grand Prix Masters | Carpet | (United States) Jim Grabb | (United States) Paul Annacone (Australia) John Fitzgerald | 2–6, 2–6 |
| Win | 11–7 | Feb 1989 | Memphis, United States | Grand Prix | Hard | (United States) Paul Annacone | (United States) Scott Davis (United States) Tim Wilkison | 7–6, 6–7, 6–1 |
| Win | 12–7 | Feb 1989 | Philadelphia, United States | Grand Prix | Carpet | (United States) Paul Annacone | (United States) Rick Leach (United States) Jim Pugh | 6–3, 7–5 |
| Loss | 12–8 | Mar 1989 | Scottsdale, United States | Grand Prix | Hard | (United States) Paul Annacone | (United States) Rick Leach (United States) Jim Pugh | 7–6, 3–6, 2–6, 6–2, 4–6 |
| Loss | 12–9 | Oct 1989 | San Francisco, United States | Grand Prix | Carpet | (United States) Paul Annacone | (South Africa) Pieter Aldrich (South Africa) Danie Visser | 4–6, 3–6 |
| Win | 13–9 | Sep 1990 | Basel, Switzerland | World Series | Hard | (South Africa) Stefan Kruger | (United Kingdom) Neil Broad (South Africa) Gary Muller | 4–6, 7–6, 6–3 |
| Win | 14–9 | Oct 1990 | Tel Aviv, Israel | World Series | Hard | (Nigeria) Nduka Odizor | (Sweden) Ronnie Båthman (Sweden) Rikard Bergh | 6–3, 6–4 |
| Loss | 14–10 | Apr 1991 | Singapore, Singapore | World Series | Hard | (South Africa) Stefan Kruger | (Canada) Grant Connell (Canada) Glenn Michibata | 4–6, 7–5, 6–7 |
| Loss | 14–11 | Oct 1992 | Taipei, Taiwan | World Series | Carpet | (Germany) Patrick Baur | (Australia) John Fitzgerald (Australia) Sandon Stolle | 6–7, 2–6 |
| Loss | 14–12 | Feb 1993 | Marseille, France | World Series | Carpet | (United States) Ivan Lendl | (France) Arnaud Boetsch (France) Olivier Delaître | 3–6, 6–7 |
| Win | 15–12 | Apr 1993 | Osaka, Japan | World Series | Hard | (United States) Mark Keil | (Canada) Glenn Michibata (United States) David Pate | 7–6, 6–3 |
| Win | 16–12 | Jul 1993 | Newport, United States | World Series | Grass | (Argentina) Javier Frana | (Zimbabwe) Byron Black (United States) Jim Pugh | 4–6, 6–1, 7–6 |
| Win | 17–12 | Apr 1994 | Birmingham, United States | World Series | Clay | (United States) Richey Reneberg | (United States) Brian MacPhie (United States) David Witt | 2–6, 6–3, 6–2 |
| Win | 18–12 | Nov 1995 | Buenos Aires, Argentina | World Series | Clay | (United States) Vincent Spadea | (Czech Republic) Jiří Novák (Czech Republic) David Rikl | 6–3, 6–3 |
| Win | 19–12 | May 1996 | Atlanta, United States | World Series | Clay | (United States) David Wheaton | (United States) Bill Behrens (United States) Matt Lucena | 7–6, 6–2 |
| Win | 20–12 | Jun 1996 | Bologna, Italy | World Series | Clay | (South Africa) Brent Haygarth | (Morocco) Karim Alami (Hungary) Gábor Köves | 6–1, 6–4 |

== ATP Challenger and ITF Futures finals ==
=== Singles: 6 (5–1) ===
| Legend ATP Challenger (5–1) ITF Futures (0–0) | Finals by surface Hard (4–1) Clay (0–0) Grass (1–0) Carpet (0–0) |

| Result | W–L | Date | Tournament | Tier | Surface | Opponent | Score |
|---|---|---|---|---|---|---|---|
| Win | 1-0 | Apr 1989 | Cape Town, South Africa | Challenger | Hard | (South Africa) Pieter Aldrich | 6–3, 6–1 |
| Win | 2-0 | Jul 1991 | Newcastle, United Kingdom | Challenger | Grass | (Netherlands) Michiel Schapers | 6–4, 6–0 |
| Loss | 2-1 | Sep 1991 | Singapore, Singapore | Challenger | Hard | (Australia) Mark Woodforde | 1–6, 4–6 |
| Win | 3-1 | Oct 1991 | Jerusalem, Israel | Challenger | Hard | (South Africa) Clinton Marsh | 2–6, 6–2, 6–3 |
| Win | 4-1 | Dec 1991 | Bossonnens, Switzerland | Challenger | Hard | (Germany) Patrick Baur | 6–4, 7–6 |
| Win | 5-1 | Sep 1993 | Singapore, Singapore | Challenger | Hard | (United States) Jonathan Canter | 6–2, 5–7, 6–2 |

=== Doubles: 8 (6–2) ===
| Legend ATP Challenger (6–2) ITF Futures (0–0) | Finals by surface Hard (2–1) Clay (2–0) Grass (1–1) Carpet (1–0) |

| Result | W–L | Date | Tournament | Tier | Surface | Partner | Opponents | Score |
|---|---|---|---|---|---|---|---|---|
| Loss | 0–1 | Jul 1991 | Newcastle, United Kingdom | Challenger | Grass | (South Africa) John-Laffnie De Jager | (United Kingdom) Nicholas Fulwood (Sweden) Peter Nyborg | 6–7, 1–6 |
| Win | 1–1 | Oct 1992 | Jerusalem, Israel | Challenger | Hard | (South Africa) John-Laffnie De Jager | (Nigeria) Nduka Odizor (United States) Bryan Shelton | 6–2, 6–4 |
| Win | 2–1 | Jul 1992 | Newcastle, United Kingdom | Challenger | Grass | (Argentina) Javier Frana | (United States) Kent Kinnear (Sweden) Peter Nyborg | 7–6, 7–6 |
| Win | 3–1 | Nov 1992 | Aachen, Germany | Challenger | Carpet | (South Africa) Grant Stafford | (Denmark) Michael Mortensen (Germany) Christian Saceanu | 6–1, 6–3 |
| Win | 4–1 | Sep 1993 | Singapore, Singapore | Challenger | Hard | (United Kingdom) Jeremy Bates | (Netherlands) Sander Groen (South Africa) Grant Stafford | 6–3, 6–4 |
| Loss | 4–2 | Sep 1995 | Aruba, Aruba | Challenger | Hard | (Spain) Jose-Antonio Conde | (India) Mahesh Bhupathi (India) Leander Paes | 4–6, 6–4, 6–7 |
| Win | 5–2 | Mar 1996 | Agadir, Morocco | Challenger | Clay | (United States) Jared Palmer | (Sweden) Patrik Fredriksson (Sweden) Magnus Norman | 3–6, 6–3, 6–2 |
| Win | 6–2 | May 1997 | Bratislava, Slovakia | Challenger | Clay | (United States) Jared Palmer | (Spain) Joan Balcells (United States) Devin Bowen | 4–6, 6–3, 7–5 |

== Performance timelines ==
Key
| W | F | SF | QF | #R | RR | Q# | DNQ | A | NH |

(W) winner; (F) finalist; (SF) semifinalist; (QF) quarterfinalist; (#R) rounds 4, 3, 2, 1; (RR) round-robin stage; (Q#) qualification round; (DNQ) did not qualify; (A) absent; (NH) not held; (SR) strike rate (events won / competed); (W–L) win–loss record.

=== Singles ===
| Tournament | 1982 | 1983 | 1984 | 1985 | 1986 | 1987 | 1988 | 1989 | 1990 | 1991 | 1992 | 1993 | 1994 | 1995 | SR | W–L | Win % |
|---|---|---|---|---|---|---|---|---|---|---|---|---|---|---|---|---|---|
Grand Slam tournaments
| Australian Open | A | A | 2R | A | A | 3R | 3R | 4R | 2R | 2R | 1R | A | 1R | A | 0 / 8 | 9–8 | 53% |
| French Open | A | A | A | A | A | A | A | A | A | A | A | A | A | A | 0 / 0 | 0–0 | – |
| Wimbledon | Q2 | Q2 | 3R | Q3 | 4R | 3R | 1R | 4R | 2R | 3R | 2R | 3R | A | A | 0 / 9 | 16–9 | 64% |
| US Open | A | A | A | 1R | 3R | A | A | 2R | 4R | 1R | 1R | A | Q2 | A | 0 / 6 | 6–6 | 50% |
| Win–loss | 0–0 | 0–0 | 2–2 | 0–1 | 5–2 | 4–2 | 2–2 | 7–3 | 5–3 | 3–3 | 1–3 | 2–1 | 0–1 | 0–0 | 0 / 23 | 31–23 | 57% |
Olympic Games
| Summer Olympics | NH | | A | Not Held | | | A | Not Held | | | 1R | Not Held | | | 0 / 1 | 0–1 | 0% |
ATP Masters Series
| Indian Wells | A | A | A | A | A | 2R | 2R | 2R | 2R | A | 2R | Q1 | A | Q1 | 0 / 5 | 5–5 | 50% |
| Miami | A | A | A | 1R | 2R | 1R | 1R | 3R | 3R | A | 1R | 1R | 1R | A | 0 / 9 | 4–9 | 31% |
| Monte Carlo | A | A | A | A | A | A | A | A | 1R | A | A | A | A | A | 0 / 1 | 0–1 | 0% |
| Hamburg | A | A | A | A | A | A | A | A | A | A | 1R | A | A | A | 0 / 1 | 0–1 | 0% |
| Rome | A | A | A | A | A | A | A | A | A | A | 1R | A | A | A | 0 / 1 | 0–1 | 0% |
| Canada | A | A | A | A | A | A | A | A | A | A | 1R | A | A | A | 0 / 1 | 0–1 | 0% |
| Cincinnati | A | A | A | A | 3R | 2R | A | A | 1R | A | 1R | A | A | A | 0 / 4 | 3–4 | 43% |
| Paris | A | A | A | A | A | 1R | A | 1R | A | A | A | A | A | A | 0 / 2 | 0–2 | 0% |
| Win–loss | 0–0 | 0–0 | 0–0 | 0–1 | 3–2 | 2–4 | 1–2 | 3–3 | 2–4 | 0–0 | 1–6 | 0–1 | 0–1 | 0–0 | 0 / 24 | 12–24 | 33% |

=== Doubles ===
| Tournament | 1982 | 1983 | 1984 | 1985 | 1986 | 1987 | 1988 | 1989 | 1990 | 1991 | 1992 | 1993 | 1994 | 1995 | 1996 | 1997 | SR | W–L | Win % |
|---|---|---|---|---|---|---|---|---|---|---|---|---|---|---|---|---|---|---|---|
Grand Slam tournaments
| Australian Open | A | A | QF | W | A | SF | 3R | 3R | 2R | 1R | 2R | A | 3R | 2R | 1R | 1R | 1 / 12 | 20–11 | 65% |
| French Open | A | A | 1R | QF | A | 2R | A | A | A | A | 1R | A | 1R | A | 2R | 2R | 0 / 7 | 6–7 | 46% |
| Wimbledon | Q1 | 1R | Q2 | QF | SF | QF | 2R | 1R | 1R | 1R | 2R | 1R | 2R | A | 1R | 1R | 0 / 13 | 13–13 | 50% |
| US Open | A | 1R | 2R | 3R | 3R | A | A | SF | QF | 2R | A | 3R | A | 1R | 2R | A | 0 / 10 | 16–10 | 62% |
| Win–loss | 0–0 | 0–2 | 4–4 | 13–3 | 6–2 | 7–3 | 3–2 | 6–3 | 4–3 | 1–3 | 2–3 | 2–2 | 3–3 | 1–2 | 2–4 | 1–3 | 1 / 42 | 55–41 | 57% |
ATP Masters Series
| Indian Wells | A | A | A | A | A | SF | 1R | QF | 2R | A | 1R | A | A | 1R | A | 1R | 0 / 7 | 4–7 | 36% |
| Miami | A | A | A | W | 1R | W | SF | 3R | 2R | A | 1R | A | 1R | 1R | A | 1R | 2 / 10 | 18–8 | 69% |
| Monte Carlo | A | A | A | A | A | SF | A | A | 1R | A | 1R | A | A | A | A | A | 0 / 3 | 2–3 | 40% |
| Hamburg | A | A | A | A | A | A | A | SF | A | A | A | A | A | A | A | A | 0 / 1 | 2–1 | 67% |
| Rome | A | A | A | 1R | A | A | A | QF | A | A | A | A | A | A | 2R | A | 0 / 3 | 3–3 | 50% |
| Canada | A | A | A | QF | A | QF | A | A | A | A | A | A | A | A | A | A | 0 / 2 | 3–2 | 60% |
| Cincinnati | A | A | A | 1R | A | A | A | A | 1R | A | Q1 | A | A | A | A | A | 0 / 2 | 0–2 | 0% |
| Paris | A | A | A | A | A | SF | F | 1R | 1R | A | A | A | A | A | A | A | 0 / 4 | 5–4 | 56% |
| Win–loss | 0–0 | 0–0 | 0–0 | 8–3 | 0–1 | 13–4 | 7–3 | 7–5 | 1–5 | 0–0 | 0–3 | 0–0 | 0–1 | 0–2 | 1–1 | 0–2 | 2 / 32 | 37–30 | 55% |

=== Mixed doubles ===
| Tournament | 1983 | 1984 | 1985 | 1986 | 1987 | 1988 | 1989 | 1990 | 1991 | 1992 | 1993 | 1994 | 1995 | 1996 | 1997 | SR | W–L | Win % |
|---|---|---|---|---|---|---|---|---|---|---|---|---|---|---|---|---|---|---|
Grand Slam tournaments
| Australian Open | A | A | A | A | A | A | A | 1R | A | A | A | A | A | A | 1R | 0 / 2 | 0–2 | 0% |
| French Open | A | 1R | 1R | A | A | A | A | 1R | A | A | A | A | A | 2R | A | 0 / 4 | 1–4 | 20% |
| Wimbledon | 2R | 1R | 2R | 3R | 2R | 1R | A | 2R | SF | A | 2R | 3R | A | SF | 1R | 0 / 12 | 17–12 | 59% |
| US Open | A | A | A | A | A | A | A | 1R | SF | A | A | A | A | SF | A | 0 / 3 | 6–3 | 67% |
| Win–loss | 1–1 | 0–2 | 1–2 | 0–0 | 1–1 | 2–2 | 0–0 | 1–4 | 7–2 | 0–0 | 1–1 | 2–1 | 0–0 | 8–3 | 0–2 | 0 / 21 | 24–21 | 53% |
