= 1987 Paris Open =

- Date: 2–9 November
- Edition: 15th
- Draw: 32S / 16D
- Prize money: $700,000
- Surface: Carpet / indoor
- Location: Paris, France
- Venue: Palais omnisports de Paris-Bercy

Champions

Singles
- (United States) Tim Mayotte

Doubles
- (Switzerland) Jakob Hlasek / (Switzerland) Claudio Mezzadri
| ← 1986 · | Paris Masters | · 1988 → |

The 1987 Paris Open was a Grand Prix men's tennis tournament played on indoor carpet courts. It was the 15th edition of the Paris Open (later known as the Paris Masters). It took place at the Palais omnisports de Paris-Bercy in Paris, France from 2 November through 9 November 1987.

== Finals ==
=== Singles ===
(United States) Tim Mayotte defeated (United States) Brad Gilbert 2–6, 6–3, 7–5, 6–7, 6–3

=== Doubles ===
(Switzerland) Jakob Hlasek / (Switzerland) Claudio Mezzadri defeated (United States) Scott Davis / (United States) David Pate 7–6, 6–2
