= 1989 Paris Open – Singles =

Singles
- 1989 Paris Open

Final
- Champion: (West Germany) Boris Becker
- Runner-up: (Sweden) Stefan Edberg
- Score: 6–4, 6–3, 6–3

Details
- Draw: 32
- Seeds: 8

Events
Singles	Doubles
← 1988 ·	Paris Open	· 1990 →

Amos Mansdorf was the defending champion but lost in the first round to Michael Chang.

Boris Becker won in the final 6–4, 6–3, 6–3 against Stefan Edberg.

== Seeds ==
A champion seed is indicated in bold text while text in italics indicates the round in which that seed was eliminated.

1. (West Germany) **Boris Becker (champion)**
2. (Sweden) Stefan Edberg (final)
3. (United States) John McEnroe (semifinals)
4. (United States) Brad Gilbert (quarterfinals)
5. (United States) Michael Chang (quarterfinals)
6. (United States) Aaron Krickstein (semifinals)
7. (Argentina) Alberto Mancini (second round)
8. (United States) Tim Mayotte (first round)

== Draw ==
=== Key ===
- Q = Qualifier
- WC = Wild card
- LL = Lucky loser
- Alt = Alternate
- SE = Special exempt
- PR = Protected ranking
- ITF = ITF entry
- JE = Junior exempt
- w/o = Walkover
- r = Retired
- d = Defaulted
- SR = Special ranking
- NB: The Final was the best of 5 sets while all other rounds were the best of 3 sets.

=== Final ===
Final
1	(West Germany) **Boris Becker**	**6**	**6**	**6**
2	(Sweden) Stefan Edberg	4	3	3

=== Section 1 ===
First round
1	(West Germany) **B Becker**	**6**	**6**
Q	(Czechoslovakia) M Šrejber	3	3
WC	(France) F Santoro	5	3
WC	(France) **G Forget**	**7**	**6**
(United States) K Curren	5	4
Q	(Australia) **W Masur**	**7**	**6**
(Sweden) M Wilander	6	4
7	(Argentina) **A Mancini**	**7**	**6**
3	(United States) **J McEnroe**	**6**	**6**
Q	(Sweden) J Svensson	3	3
(Austria) **H Skoff**	**6**	4	**6**
(South Africa) C van Rensburg	4	**6**	3
WC	(France) **H Leconte**	**7**	**6**
SE	(United States) R Matuszewski	6	0
(Israel) A Mansdorf	3	2
5	(United States) **M Chang**	**6**	**6**

Second round
1	(West Germany) **B Becker**	6	**6**	**7**
WC	(France) G Forget	**7**	4	6
Q	(Australia) **W Masur**	4	**6**	**6**
7	(Argentina) A Mancini	**6**	3	0
3	(United States) **J McEnroe**	**7**	**6**
(Austria) H Skoff	6	0
WC	(France) H Leconte	3	2
5	(United States) **M Chang**	**6**	**6**

Quarterfinals
1	(West Germany) **B Becker**	6	**6**	**7**
Q	(Australia) W Masur	**7**	4	6
3	(United States) **J McEnroe**	**6**	**6**
5	(United States) M Chang	4	3

Semifinals
1	(West Germany) **B Becker**	**7**	3	**6**
3	(United States) J McEnroe	6	**6**	3

=== Section 2 ===
First round
6	(United States) **A Krickstein**	**6**	**6**
(Sweden) M Pernfors	1	3
Q	(Haiti) **R Agénor**	**7**	**7**
(Italy) P Canè	6	5
(Austria) T Muster	5	**6**	4
(France) **Y Noah**	**7**	3	**6**
SE	(Czechoslovakia) P Korda	**6**	6	3
4	(United States) **B Gilbert**	3	**7**	**6**
8	(United States) T Mayotte	**6**	3	3
(Switzerland) **J Hlasek**	2	**6**	**6**
(West Germany) C-U Steeb	**6**	4	6
(Argentina) **M Jaite**	2	**6**	**7**
(Czechoslovakia) **M Mečíř**	**6**	**6**
(Spain) E Sánchez	2	2
(Soviet Union) A Chesnokov	2	3
2	(Sweden) **S Edberg**	**6**	**6**

Second round
6	(United States) **A Krickstein**	**6**	5	**6**
Q	(Haiti) R Agénor	3	**7**	4
(France) Y Noah	6	6
4	(United States) **B Gilbert**	**7**	**7**
(Switzerland) **J Hlasek**	4	**6**	**6**
(Argentina) M Jaite	**6**	3	4
(Czechoslovakia) M Mečíř	6	4
2	(Sweden) **S Edberg**	**7**	**6**

Quarterfinals
6	(United States) **A Krickstein**	4	**6**	**6**
4	(United States) B Gilbert	**6**	3	4
(Switzerland) J Hlasek	4	3
2	(Sweden) **S Edberg**	**6**	**6**

Semifinals
6	(United States) A Krickstein	4	**6**	2
2	(Sweden) **S Edberg**	**6**	4	**6**
