= 1989 Paris Open =

- Date: 30 October – 6 November
- Edition: 17th
- Draw: 32S / 16D
- Prize money: $1,000,000
- Surface: Carpet / indoor
- Location: Paris, France
- Venue: Palais omnisports de Paris-Bercy

Champions

Singles
- (West Germany) Boris Becker

Doubles
- (Australia) John Fitzgerald / (Sweden) Anders Järryd
| ← 1988 · | Paris Masters | · 1990 → |

The 1989 Paris Open was a Grand Prix tennis tournament played on indoor carpet courts. It was the 17th edition of the Paris Open (later known as the Paris Masters). It took place at the Palais omnisports de Paris-Bercy in Paris, France, from 30 October through 6 November 1989. First-seeded Boris Becker won the singles title and earned $300,000 first-prize money.

== Finals ==
=== Singles ===
(West Germany) Boris Becker defeated (Sweden) Stefan Edberg 6–4, 6–3, 6–3

- It was Becker's 6th title of the year and the 33rd of his career.

=== Doubles ===
(Australia) John Fitzgerald / (Sweden) Anders Järryd defeated (Switzerland) Jakob Hlasek / (France) Éric Winogradsky 7–6, 6–4

- It was Fitzgerald's only title of the year and the 11th of his career. It was Fitzgerald's 2nd title of the year and the 24th of his career.
