= 1987 Paris Open – Singles =

Singles
- 1987 Paris Open

Final
- Champion: (United States) Tim Mayotte
- Runner-up: (United States) Brad Gilbert
- Score: 2–6, 6–3, 7–5, 6–7, 6–3

Details
- Draw: 32
- Seeds: 8

Events
Singles	Doubles
← 1986 ·	Paris Open	· 1988 →

Boris Becker was the defending champion but did not compete that year.

Tim Mayotte won in the final 2–6, 6–3, 7–5, 6–7, 6–3 against Brad Gilbert.

== Seeds ==
A champion seed is indicated in bold text while text in italics indicates the round in which that seed was eliminated.

1. (Czechoslovakia) Miloslav Mečíř (second round)
2. (Australia) Pat Cash (quarterfinals)
3. (France) Yannick Noah (quarterfinals)
4. (Ecuador) Andrés Gómez (first round)
5. (United States) **Tim Mayotte (champion)**
6. (Argentina) Martín Jaite (first round)
7. (United States) Brad Gilbert (final)
8. (United States) David Pate (first round)

== Draw ==
=== Key ===
- Q = Qualifier
- WC = Wild card
- LL = Lucky loser
- Alt = Alternate
- SE = Special exempt
- PR = Protected ranking
- ITF = ITF entry
- JE = Junior exempt
- w/o = Walkover
- r = Retired
- d = Defaulted
- SR = Special ranking

=== Final ===
Final
7	(United States) Brad Gilbert	**6**	3	5	**7**	3
5	(United States) **Tim Mayotte**	2	**6**	**7**	6	**6**

=== Section 1 ===
First round
1	(Czechoslovakia) **M Mečíř**	3	**6**	**6**
(France) G Forget	**6**	3	4
(United States) **K Curren**	**6**	**6**
(South Africa) C van Rensburg	4	4
(Czechoslovakia) **T Šmíd**	**6**	**6**
(Czechoslovakia) M Vajda	3	3
(Switzerland) C Mezzadri	0	3
7	(United States) **B Gilbert**	**6**	**6**
3	(France) **Y Noah**	**6**	**6**
(Australia) W Masur	3	4
(France) T Benhabiles	6	6
Q	(Iran) **M Bahrami**	**7**	**7**
Q	(Netherlands) **M Schapers**	**6**	**6**
WC	(France) T Tulasne	3	3
Q	(Soviet Union) **A Volkov**	6	**6**	**6**
6	(Argentina) M Jaite	**7**	3	1

Second round
1	(Czechoslovakia) M Mečíř	5	4
(United States) **K Curren**	**7**	**6**
(Czechoslovakia) T Šmíd	2	2
7	(United States) **B Gilbert**	**6**	**6**
3	(France) **Y Noah**	**7**	**6**
Q	(Iran) M Bahrami	6	4
Q	(Netherlands) **M Schapers**	**6**	4	**6**
Q	(Soviet Union) A Volkov	3	**6**	3

Quarterfinals
(United States) K Curren	5	4
7	(United States) **B Gilbert**	**7**	**6**
3	(France) Y Noah
Q	(Netherlands) **M Schapers**	w/o

Semifinals
7	(United States) **B Gilbert**	**7**	5	**6**
Q	(Netherlands) M Schapers	5	**7**	4

=== Section 2 ===
First round
5	(United States) **T Mayotte**	**6**	**7**
Q	(Israel) G Bloom	1	5
(Socialist Federal Republic of Yugoslavia) **S Živojinović**	**6**	**7**
(Soviet Union) A Chesnokov	2	6
(Israel) **A Mansdorf**	**6**	**6**
(United States) S Davis	3	3
WC	(France) **T Champion**	**6**	**6**
4	(Ecuador) A Gómez	3	4
8	(United States) D Pate	**7**	2	2
(Argentina) **E Bengoechea**	6	**6**	**6**
(France) **H Leconte**	**7**	**6**
WC	(France) J-P Fleurian	5	1
(Switzerland) **J Hlasek**	**6**	**6**
(United States) J Kriek	3	2
(United States) P Annacone	4	4
2	(Australia) **P Cash**	**6**	**6**

Second round
5	(United States) **T Mayotte**	4	**6**	**6**
(Socialist Federal Republic of Yugoslavia) S Živojinović	**6**	2	2
(Israel) **A Mansdorf**	**6**	**6**
WC	(France) T Champion	2	3
(Argentina) E Bengoechea	2	1
(France) **H Leconte**	**6**	**6**
(Switzerland) J Hlasek	3	6
2	(Australia) **P Cash**	**6**	**7**

Quarterfinals
5	(United States) **T Mayotte**	**6**	**6**
(Israel) A Mansdorf	4	2
(France) **H Leconte**	**6**	6	**6**
2	(Australia) P Cash	4	**7**	3

Semifinals
5	(United States) **T Mayotte**	**6**	4	**6**
(France) H Leconte	3	**6**	3
