= 1990 Paris Open – Singles =

Singles
- 1990 Paris Open

Final
- Champion: (Sweden) Stefan Edberg
- Runner-up: (Germany) Boris Becker
- Score: 3–3 ret.

Details
- Draw: 48
- Seeds: 16

Events
| Singles | Doubles |
| ← 1989 · | Paris Open | · 1991 → |

Stefan Edberg won the singles tennis title at the 1990 Paris Open after the defending champion Boris Becker retired in the final, with the scoreline at 3–3.

== Seeds ==
A champion seed is indicated in bold text while text in italics indicates the round in which that seed was eliminated. All sixteen seeds received a bye to the second round.

1. (Sweden) **Stefan Edberg (champion)**
2. (Germany) Boris Becker (final)
3. (Czechoslovakia) Ivan Lendl (third round)
4. (United States) Pete Sampras (third round)
5. (Ecuador) Andrés Gómez (second round)
6. (Spain) Emilio Sánchez (quarterfinals)
7. (United States) John McEnroe (second round)
8. (United States) Brad Gilbert (third round)
9. (Socialist Federal Republic of Yugoslavia) Goran Ivanišević (third round)
10. (Soviet Union) Andrei Chesnokov (second round)
11. (United States) Michael Chang (second round)
12. (France) Guy Forget (third round)
13. (Argentina) Guillermo Pérez Roldán (second round)
14. (Sweden) Jonas Svensson (semifinals)
15. (United States) Aaron Krickstein (third round)
16. (Spain) Juan Aguilera (second round)

== Draw ==
=== Key ===
- Q = Qualifier
- WC = Wild card
- LL = Lucky loser
- Alt = Alternate
- SE = Special exempt
- PR = Protected ranking
- ITF = ITF entry
- JE = Junior exempt
- w/o = Walkover
- r = Retired
- d = Defaulted
- SR = Special ranking

=== Finals ===
Quarterfinals
1 | **(Sweden) Stefan Edberg** | **6** | **6**
(Switzerland) Jakob Hlasek | 3 | 4
Q | (France) Guillaume Raoux | **6** | 1 | 3
**(Spain) Sergi Bruguera** | 4 | **6** | **6**
6 | (Spain) Emilio Sánchez | 5 | 4
14 | **(Sweden) Jonas Svensson** | **7** | **6**
Q | (Germany) Michael Stich | 1 | 2
2 | **(Germany) Boris Becker** | **6** | **6**

Semifinals
1 | (Sweden) **Stefan Edberg** | **6** | **6**
(Spain) Sergi Bruguera | 3 | 3
14 | (Sweden) Jonas Svensson | **6** | 6 | 1
2 | (Germany) **Boris Becker** | 4 | **7** | **6**

Final
1 | (Sweden) **Stefan Edberg** | 3
2 | (Germany) Boris Becker | 3^{r}

=== Top half ===
==== Section 1 ====
First round
(Soviet Union) **A Cherkasov** | 3 | **6** | **6**
WC | (France) F Santoro | **6** | 3 | 2
(Czechoslovakia) K Nováček | 3 | **6** | 6
WC | (France) **Y Noah** | **6** | 3 | **7**
(Sweden) **M Gustafsson** | **7** | **7**
(United States) D Wheaton | 6 | 6
(Switzerland) **J Hlasek** | **6** | **6**
WC | (Sweden) M Wilander | 3 | 2

Second round
1 | (Sweden) **S Edberg** | **6** | **6**
(Soviet Union) A Cherkasov | 2 | 3
WC | (France) Y Noah | 3 | 2
15 | (United States) **A Krickstein** | **6** | **6**
9 | (Socialist Federal Republic of Yugoslavia) **G Ivanišević** | **6** | **6**
(Sweden) M Gustafsson | 2 | 4
(Switzerland) **J Hlasek** | 3 | **6** | **7**
7 | (United States) J McEnroe | **6** | 3 | 6

Third round
1 | (Sweden) **S Edberg** | **6** | **6**
15 | (United States) A Krickstein | 3 | 2
9 | (Socialist Federal Republic of Yugoslavia) G Ivanišević | 3 | 1
(Switzerland) **J Hlasek** | **6** | **6**

Quarterfinals
1 | (Sweden) **S Edberg** | **6** | **6**
(Switzerland) J Hlasek | 3 | 4

==== Section 2 ====
First round
(Australia) W Masur | 2 | 6
(Germany) **C-U Steeb** | **6** | **7**
(Uruguay) M Filippini | **6** | 4 | 3
Q | (France) **G Raoux** | 2 | **6** | **6**
(Spain) J Arrese | 3 | 1
(Switzerland) **M Rosset** | **6** | **6**
(France) H Leconte | **6** | 2 | 2^{r}
(Spain) **S Bruguera** | 1 | **6** | 5

Second round
4 | (United States) **P Sampras** | **7** | 3 | **7**
(Germany) C-U Steeb | 6 | **6** | 6
Q | (France) **G Raoux** | **7** | **6**
13 | (Argentina) G Pérez Roldán | 5 | 4
11 | (United States) M Chang | 6 | 4
(Switzerland) **M Rosset** | **7** | **6**
(Spain) **S Bruguera** | **7** | 4 | **6**
5 | (Ecuador) A Gómez | 6 | **6** | 1

Third round
4 | (United States) P Sampras | 3 | **6** | 3
Q | (France) **G Raoux** | **6** | 3 | **6**
(Switzerland) M Rosset | **6** | 1 | 3
(Spain) **S Bruguera** | 4 | **6** | **6**

Quarterfinals
Q | (France) G Raoux | **6** | 1 | 3
(Spain) **S Bruguera** | 4 | **6** | **6**

=== Bottom half ===
==== Section 3 ====
First round
(Australia) R Fromberg | 6 | **7** | 5
Q | (United States) **P McEnroe** | **7** | 6 | **7**
(Soviet Union) A Volkov | **6** | 5 | 5
(Haiti) **R Agénor** | 2 | **7** | **7**
(United States) T Mayotte | **6** | 3 | 4
WC | (France) **T Champion** | 4 | **6** | **6**
(Czechoslovakia) P Korda | 2 | 2
Q | (United States) **K Curren** | **6** | **6**

Second round
6 | (Spain) **E Sánchez** | **6** | **7**
Q | (United States) P McEnroe | 4 | 6
(Haiti) R Agénor | 6 | 2
12 | (France) **G Forget** | **7** | **6**
14 | (Sweden) **J Svensson** | **6** | **6**
WC | (France) T Champion | 2 | 2
Q | (United States) K Curren | 3 | 4
3 | (Czechoslovakia) **I Lendl** | **6** | **6**

Third round
6 | (Spain) **E Sánchez** | **7** | **6**
12 | (France) G Forget | 5 | 3
14 | (Sweden) **J Svensson** | 3 | **6** | **6**
3 | (Czechoslovakia) I Lendl | **6** | 4 | 2

Quarterfinals
6 | (Spain) E Sánchez | 5 | 4
14 | (Sweden) **J Svensson** | **7** | **6**

==== Section 4 ====
First round
(Israel) **A Mansdorf** | 6 | **6** | **6**
(Argentina) M Jaite | **7** | 3 | 0
Q | (Germany) **M Stich** | **6** | 1
(Austria) H Skoff | 1 | 0^{r}
Q | (United States) J Grabb | 5 | **7** | 3
(United States) **J Courier** | **7** | 6 | **6**
(United States) **R Reneberg** | **7** | **6**
Q | (France) É Winogradsky | 6 | 3

Second round
8 | (United States) **B Gilbert** | **6** | **7**
(Israel) A Mansdorf | 3 | 6
Q | (Germany) **M Stich** | **7** | **6**
10 | (Soviet Union) A Chesnokov | 6 | 4
16 | (Spain) J Aguilera | 1 | 2
(United States) **J Courier** | **6** | **6**
(United States) R Reneberg | **6** | 3 | 2
2 | (Germany) **B Becker** | 4 | **6** | **6**

Third round
8 | (United States) B Gilbert | 4 | 4
Q | (Germany) **M Stich** | **6** | **6**
(United States) J Courier | 1 | 5
2 | (Germany) **B Becker** | **6** | **7**

Quarterfinals
Q | (Germany) M Stich | 1 | 2
2 | (Germany) **B Becker** | **6** | **6**
