= 1989 Paris Open – Doubles =

Doubles
- 1989 Paris Open
- 1988 Champions: (United States) Paul Annacone (Australia) John Fitzgerald

Final
- Champions: (Australia) John Fitzgerald (Sweden) Anders Järryd
- Runners-up: (Switzerland) Jakob Hlasek (France) Eric Winogradsky
- Score: 7–6, 6–4

Details
- Draw: 16
- Seeds: 4

Events
Singles	Doubles
← 1988 ·	Paris Open	· 1990 →

Paul Annacone and John Fitzgerald were the defending champions but they competed with different partners that year, Annacone with Christo van Rensburg and Fitzgerald with Anders Järryd.

Annacone and van Rensburg lost in the first round to Jakob Hlasek and Eric Winogradsky.

Fitzgerald and Järryd won in the final 7–6, 6–4 against Hlasek and Winogradsky.

== Seeds ==
Champion seeds are indicated in bold text while text in italics indicates the round in which those seeds were eliminated.

1. (Australia) **John Fitzgerald** / (Sweden) **Anders Järryd (champions)**
2. (United States) Rick Leach / (United States) Jim Pugh (quarterfinals)
3. (United States) Paul Annacone / (South Africa) Christo van Rensburg (first round)
4. (United States) Ken Flach / (United States) Robert Seguso (first round)

== Draw ==
=== Key ===
- Q = Qualifier
- WC = Wild card
- LL = Lucky loser
- Alt = Alternate
- ITF = ITF entry
- PR = Protected ranking
- SR = Special ranking
- SE = Special exempt
- JE = Junior exempt
- JR = Junior Accelerator Programme entrant
- CO = College Accelerator Programme entrant
- NG = Next Gen Accelerator Program entrant
- w/o = Walkover
- r = Retired
- d = Defaulted

First round
1	(Australia) **J Fitzgerald** (Sweden) **A Järryd**	**6**	**6**
(Czechoslovakia) P Korda (Czechoslovakia) T Šmíd	2	2
(United States) J Courier (United States) P Sampras	3	**6**	1
WC	(France) **G Forget** (France) **Y Noah**	**6**	1	**6**
4	(United States) K Flach (United States) R Seguso	2	6
(United States) **J McEnroe** (Australia) **M Woodforde**	**6**	**7**
(United States) K Curren (United States) D Pate	2	4
(United States) **S Davis** (United States) **T Witsken**	**6**	**6**
(Spain) **T Carbonell** (Spain) **E Sánchez**	4	**6**	**6**
(United States) T Pawsat (Australia) L Warder	**6**	3	2
(Switzerland) **J Hlasek** (France) **E Winogradsky**	**7**	**7**
3	(United States) P Annacone (South Africa) C van Rensburg	6	5
(South Africa) **P Aldrich** (South Africa) **D Visser**	**7**	**6**
(West Germany) B Becker (West Germany) E Jelen	6	4
(United States) J Grabb (United States) P McEnroe	**6**	4	2
2	(United States) **R Leach** (United States) **J Pugh**	4	**6**	**6**

Quarterfinals
1	(Australia) **J Fitzgerald** (Sweden) **A Järryd**	6	**6**	**6**
WC	(France) G Forget (France) Y Noah	**7**	3	2
(United States) **J McEnroe** (Australia) **M Woodforde**	**7**	3	**7**
(United States) S Davis (United States) T Witsken	6	**6**	6
(Spain) T Carbonell (Spain) E Sánchez
(Switzerland) **J Hlasek** (France) **E Winogradsky**	w/o
(South Africa) **P Aldrich** (South Africa) **D Visser**	**6**	**7**
2	(United States) R Leach (United States) J Pugh	3	5

Semifinals
1	(Australia) **J Fitzgerald** (Sweden) **A Järryd**	**6**	**6**
(United States) J McEnroe (Australia) M Woodforde	3	2
(Switzerland) **J Hlasek** (France) **E Winogradsky**	**6**	6	**6**
(South Africa) P Aldrich (South Africa) D Visser	4	**7**	3

Final
1	(Australia) **John Fitzgerald** (Sweden) **Anders Järryd**	**7**	**6**
(Switzerland) Jakob Hlasek (France) Eric Winogradsky	6	4
