= 1990 Paris Open =

- Date: 29 October – 5 November
- Edition: 18th
- Category: ATP Championship Series, Single Week
- Draw: 48S / 24D
- Prize money: $1,650,000
- Surface: Carpet / indoor
- Location: Paris, France

Champions

Singles
- (Sweden) Stefan Edberg

Doubles
- (United States) Scott Davis / (United States) David Pate
- Paris Masters

The 1990 Paris Open was a men's tennis tournament played on indoor carpet courts. It was the 18th edition of the Paris Masters, and was part of the newly formed ATP Championship Series, Single Week categiry of the 1990 ATP Tour. It took place at the Palais omnisports de Paris-Bercy in Paris, France, from 29 October through 5 November 1990.

The draw was headlined by ATP No. 1, Cincinnati, Indian Wells, Miami, Wimbledon and Australian Open titlist Stefan Edberg, Stockholm, Indianapolis winner, Queen's, Hamburg, Tokyo runner-up and Paris defending champion Boris Becker and Australian Open, Milan, Queen's champion, Wimbledon semi-finalist Ivan Lendl. Other top seeds were US Open titlist Pete Sampras, French Open winner Andrés Gómez, Emilio Sánchez, John McEnroe and Brad Gilbert.

Stefan Edberg won the singles title on default after Boris Becker retired injured after just 6 games.

== Finals ==
=== Singles ===
(Sweden) Stefan Edberg defeated (Germany) Boris Becker, 3–3 (retired)

- It was Edberg's 7th singles title of the year and the 27th of his career. It was his 3rd Masters title of the year, and overall.

=== Doubles ===
(United States) Scott Davis / (United States) David Pate defeated (Australia) Darren Cahill / (Australia) Mark Kratzmann, 5–7, 6–3, 6–4
