= 1987 Paris Open – Doubles =

Doubles
- 1987 Paris Open
- 1986 Champions: (United States) Peter Fleming (United States) John McEnroe

Final
- Champions: (Switzerland) Jakob Hlasek (Switzerland) Claudio Mezzadri
- Runners-up: (United States) Scott Davis (United States) David Pate
- Score: 7–6, 6–2

Details
- Draw: 16
- Seeds: 4

Events
Singles	Doubles
← 1986 ·	Paris Open	· 1988 →

Peter Fleming and John McEnroe were the defending champions but did not compete that year.

Jakob Hlasek and Claudio Mezzadri won in the final 7–6, 6–2 against Scott Davis and David Pate.

== Seeds ==
Champion seeds are indicated in bold text while text in italics indicates the round in which those seeds were eliminated.

1. (United States) Paul Annacone / (South Africa) Christo van Rensburg (semifinals)
2. (Czechoslovakia) Miloslav Mečíř / (Czechoslovakia) Tomáš Šmíd (semifinals)
3. (Australia) Pat Cash / (Ecuador) Andrés Gómez (quarterfinals)
4. (Australia) Peter Doohan / (Australia) Laurie Warder (first round)

== Draw ==
=== Key ===
- Q = Qualifier
- WC = Wild card
- LL = Lucky loser
- Alt = Alternate
- SE = Special exempt
- PR = Protected ranking
- ITF = ITF entry
- JE = Junior exempt
- w/o = Walkover
- r = Retired
- d = Defaulted
- SR = Special ranking

=== Finals ===
First round
1	(United States) **P Annacone** (South Africa) **C van Rensburg**	**6**	**6**
(Australia) C Limberger (Australia) M Woodforde	3	2
(Iran) **M Bahrami** (Uruguay) **D Pérez**	**6**	**6**
(United States) L Bourne (United States) J Klaparda	4	1
4	(Australia) P Doohan (Australia) L Warder	4	4
(United States) **K Curren** (United States) **B Gilbert**	**6**	**6**
(Paraguay) F González (Socialist Federal Republic of Yugoslavia) S Živojinović	2	4
(United States) **S Davis** (United States) **D Pate**	**6**	**6**
(Switzerland) **J Hlasek** (Switzerland) **C Mezzadri**	**6**	3	**7**
(United States) A Kohlberg (United States) R Van't Hof	4	**6**	6
(Czechoslovakia) S Birner (Spain) J López-Maeso	5	**7**	2
3	(Australia) **P Cash** (Ecuador) **A Gómez**	**7**	6	**6**
WC	(Poland) **W Fibak** (France) **H Leconte**	4	**6**	**6**
(France) L Courteau (France) G Forget	**6**	1	4
(United States) R Leach (United States) T Pawsat	1	4
2	(Czechoslovakia) **M Mečíř** (Czechoslovakia) **T Šmíd**	**6**	**6**

Quarterfinals
1	(United States) **P Annacone** (South Africa) **C van Rensburg**	**6**	**6**
(Iran) M Bahrami (Uruguay) D Pérez	3	1
(United States) K Curren (United States) B Gilbert	3	5
(United States) **S Davis** (United States) **D Pate**	**6**	**7**
(Switzerland) **J Hlasek** (Switzerland) **C Mezzadri**	**7**	3	**6**
3	(Australia) P Cash (Ecuador) A Gómez	6	**6**	4
WC	(Poland) W Fibak (France) H Leconte	3	2
2	(Czechoslovakia) **M Mečíř** (Czechoslovakia) **T Šmíd**	**6**	**6**

Semifinals
1	(United States) P Annacone (South Africa) C van Rensburg	6	**7**	3
(United States) **S Davis** (United States) **D Pate**	**7**	5	**6**
(Switzerland) **J Hlasek** (Switzerland) **C Mezzadri**	**7**	**7**
2	(Czechoslovakia) M Mečíř (Czechoslovakia) T Šmíd	6	6

Final
(United States) Scott Davis (United States) David Pate	6	2
(Switzerland) **Jakob Hlasek** (Switzerland) **Claudio Mezzadri**	**7**	**6**
