= 1988 Paris Open – Doubles =

Doubles
- 1988 Paris Open
- 1987 Champions: (Switzerland) Jakob Hlasek (Switzerland) Claudio Mezzadri

Final
- Champions: (United States) Paul Annacone (Australia) John Fitzgerald
- Runners-up: (United States) Jim Grabb (South Africa) Christo van Rensburg
- Score: 6–2, 6–2

Details
- Draw: 16
- Seeds: 4

Events
Singles	Doubles
← 1987 ·	Paris Open	· 1989 →

Jakob Hlasek and Claudio Mezzadri were the defending champions but only Hlasek competed that year with Joey Rive.

Hlasek and Rive lost in the first round to Darren Cahill and Brad Drewett.

Paul Annacone and John Fitzgerald won in the final 6–2, 6–2 against Jim Grabb and Christo van Rensburg.

== Seeds ==
Champion seeds are indicated in bold text while text in italics indicates the round in which those seeds were eliminated.

1. (United States) Ken Flach / (United States) Robert Seguso (first round)
2. (United States) Rick Leach / (United States) Jim Pugh (quarterfinals)
3. (Spain) Sergio Casal / (Spain) Emilio Sánchez (quarterfinals)
4. (Mexico) Jorge Lozano / (United States) Todd Witsken (first round)

== Draw ==
=== Key ===
- Q = Qualifier
- WC = Wild card
- LL = Lucky loser
- Alt = Alternate
- SE = Special exempt
- PR = Protected ranking
- ITF = ITF entry
- JE = Junior exempt
- w/o = Walkover
- r = Retired
- d = Defaulted
- SR = Special ranking

First round
1	(United States) K Flach (United States) R Seguso	**6**	6	3
(United States) **K Curren** (United States) **D Pate**	2	**7**	**6**
(Czechoslovakia) M Mečíř (Czechoslovakia) T Šmíd	6	4
(France) **G Forget** (Ecuador) **A Gómez**	**7**	**6**
4	(Mexico) J Lozano (United States) T Witsken	6	4
(United States) **J Grabb** (South Africa) **C van Rensburg**	**7**	**6**
(New Zealand) K Evernden (United States) J Kriek	3	**7**	3
(South Africa) **P Aldrich** (South Africa) **D Visser**	**6**	6	**6**
(United States) J McEnroe (United States) P McEnroe	2	4
(United States) **P Annacone** (Australia) **J Fitzgerald**	**6**	**6**
(Italy) C Panatta (United States) B Willenborg	3	2
3	(Spain) **S Casal** (Spain) **E Sánchez**	**6**	**6**
(Australia) **D Cahill** (Australia) **B Drewett**	**7**	**6**
(Switzerland) J Hlasek (United States) J Rive	6	3
(United States) E Korita (United States) J Levine	4	4
2	(United States) **R Leach** (United States) **J Pugh**	**6**	**6**

Quarterfinals
(United States) **K Curren** (United States) **D Pate**	**6**	**6**
(France) G Forget (Ecuador) A Gómez	4	2
(United States) **J Grabb** (South Africa) **C van Rensburg**	**6**	6	**6**
(South Africa) P Aldrich (South Africa) D Visser	4	**7**	3
(United States) **P Annacone** (Australia) **J Fitzgerald**	**7**	**6**
3	(Spain) S Casal (Spain) E Sánchez	6	3
(Australia) **D Cahill** (Australia) **B Drewett**	**6**	**6**
2	(United States) R Leach (United States) J Pugh	2	4

Semifinals
(United States) K Curren (United States) D Pate	**7**	2	6
(United States) **J Grabb** (South Africa) **C van Rensburg**	6	**6**	**7**
(United States) **P Annacone** (Australia) **J Fitzgerald**	**7**	4	**7**
(Australia) D Cahill (Australia) B Drewett	6	**6**	5

Final
(United States) Jim Grabb (South Africa) Christo van Rensburg	2	2
(United States) **Paul Annacone** (Australia) **John Fitzgerald**	**6**	**6**
