= 1992 Newsweek Champions Cup – Singles =

Singles
- 1992 Newsweek Champions Cup

Final
- Champion: (United States) Michael Chang
- Runner-up: (Commonwealth of Independent States) Andrei Chesnokov
- Score: 6–3, 6–4, 7–5

Details
- Draw: 56
- Seeds: 16

Events
Singles	Doubles
- Newsweek Champions Cup

Michael Chang defeated Andrei Chesnokov in the final, 6–3, 6–4, 7–5 to win the men's singles tennis title at the 1992 Indian Wells Masters.

Jim Courier was the defending champion, but lost to Andrei Chesnokov in the third round.

== Seeds ==
The top eight seeds receive a bye into the second round.

1. (United States) Jim Courier (third round)
2. (United States) Pete Sampras (third round)
3. (Germany) Michael Stich (semifinals)
4. (France) Guy Forget (second round)
5. (Croatia) Goran Ivanišević (second round)
6. (Czechoslovakia) Petr Korda (third round)
7. (Spain) Emilio Sánchez (quarterfinals)
8. (Czechoslovakia) Karel Nováček (third round)
9. (United States) David Wheaton (second round)
10. (United States) Andre Agassi (third round)
11. (Spain) Sergi Bruguera (quarterfinals)
12. (United States) Michael Chang (champion)
13. (Sweden) Magnus Gustafsson (third round)
14. (United States) Derrick Rostagno (third round)
15. (South Africa) Wayne Ferreira (second round)
16. (Switzerland) Jakob Hlasek (quarterfinals)

== Draw ==
Key

- Q = Qualifier
- WC = Wild card
- LL = Lucky loser
- Alt = Alternate
- ITF = ITF entry
- PR = Protected ranking
- SR = Special ranking
- SE = Special exempt
- JE = Junior exempt
- JR = Junior Accelerator Programme entrant
- CO = College Accelerator Programme entrant
- NG = Next Gen Accelerator Program entrant
- w/o = Walkover
- r = Retired
- d = Defaulted

=== Finals ===
Quarterfinals
(Commonwealth of Independent States) Andrei Chesnokov	7	7
7	(Spain) Emilio Sánchez	5	5
3	(Germany) Michael Stich	6	6
11	(Spain) Sergi Bruguera	1	2
12	(United States) Michael Chang	6	6
(Commonwealth of Independent States) Andrei Cherkasov	4	2
(Spain) Francisco Clavet	6	6
16	(Switzerland) Jakob Hlasek	1	2

Semifinals
(Commonwealth of Independent States) Andrei Chesnokov	1	7^{7}	6
3	(Germany) Michael Stich	6	6^{4}	3
12	(United States) Michael Chang	6	6
(Spain) Francisco Clavet	0	1

Final
(Commonwealth of Independent States) Andrei Chesnokov	3	4	5
12	(United States) Michael Chang	6	6	7

=== Top half ===
==== Section 1 ====
First round
(France) F Fontang	1	5
(South Africa) C van Rensburg	6	7
(Commonwealth of Independent States) A Chesnokov	6	6
Q	(Australia) S Youl	4	3
(Germany) M Zoecke	4	5
15	(South Africa) W Ferreira	6	7
10	(United States) A Agassi	6	6^{5}	6
(Peru) J Yzaga	3	7^{7}	3
Q	(United States) T Witsken	6^{4}	7	2
Q	(Germany) B Karbacher	7^{7}	5	6
(Argentina) A Mancini	2	3
(France) T Champion	6	6

Second round
1	(United States) J Courier	3	6	6
(South Africa) C van Rensburg	6	0	2
(Commonwealth of Independent States) A Chesnokov	6	6
15	(South Africa) W Ferreira	4	1
10	(United States) A Agassi	6	1	7
Q	(Germany) B Karbacher	1	6	5
(France) T Champion	6^{4}	4
7	(Spain) E Sánchez	7^{7}	6

Third round
1	(United States) J Courier	4	5
(Commonwealth of Independent States) A Chesnokov	6	7
10	(United States) A Agassi	3	1
7	(Spain) E Sánchez	6	6

Quarterfinals
(Commonwealth of Independent States) A Chesnokov	7	7
7	(Spain) E Sánchez	5	5

==== Section 2 ====
First round
(Italy) C Caratti	4	4
(United States) J Connors	6	6
(United States) R Reneberg	2	6	6
(United States) B Gilbert	6	4	4
Q	(United States) C Adams	6^{3}	3
14	(United States) D Rostagno	7^{7}	6
11	(Spain) S Bruguera	7^{7}	6
Q	(Australia) M Woodforde	6^{3}	1
(Spain) C Costa	6	6
(United States) A Krickstein	4	2
Q	(South Africa) M Ondruska	6	6^{7}	6
(France) F Santoro	3	7^{9}	3

Second round
3	(Germany) M Stich	6	6
(United States) J Connors	4	3
(United States) R Reneberg	3	7^{10}	3
14	(United States) D Rostagno	6	6^{8}	6
11	(Spain) S Bruguera	7^{8}	6
(Spain) C Costa	6^{6}	3
Q	(South Africa) M Ondruska	6	5	1
6	(Czechoslovakia) P Korda	4	7	6

Third round
3	(Germany) M Stich	6	6
14	(United States) D Rostagno	2	4
11	(Spain) S Bruguera	7	4	6
6	(Czechoslovakia) P Korda	5	6	0

Quarterfinals
3	(Germany) M Stich	6	6
11	(Spain) S Bruguera	1	2

=== Bottom half ===
==== Section 3 ====
First round
WC	(Netherlands) R Krajicek	5	6	6
WC	(Australia) R Fromberg	7	4	3
(France) O Delaître	3	0
(Spain) J Sánchez	6	6
(Argentina) M Jaite	0	7^{8}	6^{3}
12	(United States) M Chang	6	6^{6}	7^{7}
13	(Sweden) M Gustafsson	3	6	6
WC	(Israel) A Mansdorf	6	2	4
Q	(United States) J Stark	7^{7}	3	0
(Germany) C Steeb	6^{5}	6	6
(Italy) S Pescosolido	6^{3}	7^{7}	5
(Commonwealth of Independent States) A Cherkasov	7^{7}	6^{3}	7

Second round
5	(Croatia) G Ivanišević	0	3
WC	(Netherlands) R Krajicek	6	6
(Spain) J Sánchez	6	4	1
12	(United States) M Chang	0	6	6
13	(Sweden) M Gustafsson	6	6
(Germany) C Steeb	3	3
(Commonwealth of Independent States) A Cherkasov	6	6
4	(France) G Forget	4	0

Third round
WC	(Netherlands) R Krajicek	3	7^{7}	6^{4}
12	(United States) M Chang	6	6^{4}	7^{7}
13	(Sweden) M Gustafsson	3	3
(Commonwealth of Independent States) A Cherkasov	6	6

Quarterfinals
12	(United States) M Chang	6	6
(Commonwealth of Independent States) A Cherkasov	4	2

==== Section 4 ====
First round
(France) A Boetsch	7^{8}	6
(Argentina) J Frana	6^{6}	1
WC	(United States) B MacPhie	4	3
(Spain) F Clavet	6	6
LL	(Australia) W Masur	6^{5}	6^{5}
9	(United States) D Wheaton	7^{7}	7^{7}
16	(Switzerland) J Hlasek	7	6
WC	(Australia) T Woodbridge	5	4
(Switzerland) M Rosset	3	5
(France) C Pioline	6	7
(Austria) H Skoff	6	3	2
(United States) B Shelton	4	6	6

Second round
8	(Czechoslovakia) K Nováček	6	0	7^{7}
(France) A Boetsch	2	6	6^{4}
(Spain) F Clavet	6	6
9	(United States) D Wheaton	2	3
16	(Switzerland) J Hlasek	7	6
(France) C Pioline	5	2
(United States) B Shelton	7^{7}	0	4
2	(United States) P Sampras	6^{5}	6	6

Third round
8	(Czechoslovakia) K Nováček	2	6	3
(Spain) F Clavet	6	4	6
16	(Switzerland) J Hlasek	6	3	7
2	(United States) P Sampras	4	6	5

Quarterfinals
(Spain) F Clavet	6	6
16	(Switzerland) J Hlasek	1	2
