= 1988 Paris Open – Singles =

Singles
- 1988 Paris Open

Final
- Champion: (Israel) Amos Mansdorf
- Runner-up: (United States) Brad Gilbert
- Score: 6–3, 6–2, 6–3

Details
- Draw: 32
- Seeds: 8

Events
Singles	Doubles
- Paris Open

Tim Mayotte was the defending champion but lost in the semifinals to Brad Gilbert.

Amos Mansdorf won in the final 6–3, 6–2, 6–3 against Gilbert.

== Seeds ==
A champion seed is indicated in bold text while text in italics indicates the round in which that seed was eliminated.

1. (Sweden) Mats Wilander (walkover)
2. (United States) Tim Mayotte (semifinals)
3. (France) Henri Leconte (first round)
4. (Czechoslovakia) Miloslav Mečíř (second round)
5. (Austria) Thomas Muster (second round)
6. (Sweden) Jonas Svensson (second round)
7. (Argentina) Guillermo Pérez Roldán (first round)
8. (Soviet Union) Andrei Chesnokov (quarterfinals)

== Draw ==
Key

- Q = Qualifier
- WC = Wild card
- LL = Lucky loser
- Alt = Alternate
- ITF = ITF entry
- PR = Protected ranking
- SR = Special ranking
- SE = Special exempt
- JE = Junior exempt
- JR = Junior Accelerator Programme entrant
- CO = College Accelerator Programme entrant
- NG = Next Gen Accelerator Program entrant
- w/o = Walkover
- r = Retired
- d = Defaulted
- NB: The Final was the best of 5 sets while all other rounds were the best of 3 sets.

=== Final ===
Final
(Israel) **Amos Mansdorf**	**6**	**6**	**6**
(United States) Brad Gilbert	3	2	3

=== Section 1 ===
First round
1	(Sweden) M Wilander
(Israel) **A Mansdorf**	w/o
(United States) **D Rostagno**	**6**	**6**
SE	(United States) J Pugh	1	2
(United States) **A Krickstein**	**7**	**7**
(Australia) D Cahill	6	6
(Australia) **J Fitzgerald**	**6**	**6**
7	(Argentina) G Pérez Roldán	1	2
3	(France) H Leconte	5	1
(United States) **J McEnroe**	**7**	**6**
Q	(Spain) S Casal	4	2
(United States) **P Annacone**	**6**	**6**
WC	(France) T Tulasne	4	6
(Switzerland) **J Hlasek**	**6**	**7**
(United States) D Pate	4	1
6	(Sweden) **J Svensson**	**6**	**6**

Second round
(Israel) **A Mansdorf**	**6**	**6**
(United States) D Rostagno	3	2
(United States) **A Krickstein**	**7**	**6**
(Australia) J Fitzgerald	5	4
(United States) **J McEnroe**	**6**	**6**
(United States) P Annacone	3	2
(Switzerland) **J Hlasek**	3	**6**	**6**
6	(Sweden) J Svensson	**6**	3	2

Quarterfinals
(Israel) **A Mansdorf**	**6**	**7**
(United States) A Krickstein	3	6
(United States) J McEnroe	6	**6**	6
(Switzerland) **J Hlasek**	**7**	2	**7**

Semifinals
(Israel) **A Mansdorf**	**7**	**7**
(Switzerland) J Hlasek	6	6

=== Section 2 ===
First round
5	(Austria) **T Muster**	**6**	**6**
(Sweden) A Järryd	0	4
Q	(Australia) C Limberger	**7**	4	2
WC	(France) **G Forget**	6	**6**	**6**
(United States) **B Gilbert**	**6**	**6**
(Ecuador) A Gómez	2	3
Q	(United States) R Reneberg	3	4
4	(Czechoslovakia) **M Mečíř**	**6**	**6**
8	(Soviet Union) **A Chesnokov**	6	**6**	**6**
SE	(United States) R Matuszewski	**7**	1	2
(United States) K Curren	**7**	4	4
(Haiti) **R Agénor**	6	**6**	**6**
(Argentina) M Jaite	**6**	3	6
Q	(France) **E Winogradsky**	3	**6**	**7**
WC	(France) T Champion	**7**	4	1
2	(United States) **T Mayotte**	5	**6**	**6**

Second round
5	(Austria) T Muster	3	3
WC	(France) **G Forget**	**6**	**6**
(United States) **B Gilbert**	**6**	**6**
4	(Czechoslovakia) M Mečíř	3	4
8	(Soviet Union) **A Chesnokov**	**6**	**6**
(Haiti) R Agénor	4	2
Q	(France) E Winogradsky	4	1
2	(United States) **T Mayotte**	**6**	**6**

Quarterfinals
WC	(France) G Forget	6	2
(United States) **B Gilbert**	**7**	**6**
8	(Soviet Union) A Chesnokov	3	0
2	(United States) **T Mayotte**	**6**	**6**

Semifinals
(United States) **B Gilbert**	**7**	**6**
2	(United States) T Mayotte	5	3
