= Brad Gilbert =

American tennis player and coach (born 1961)

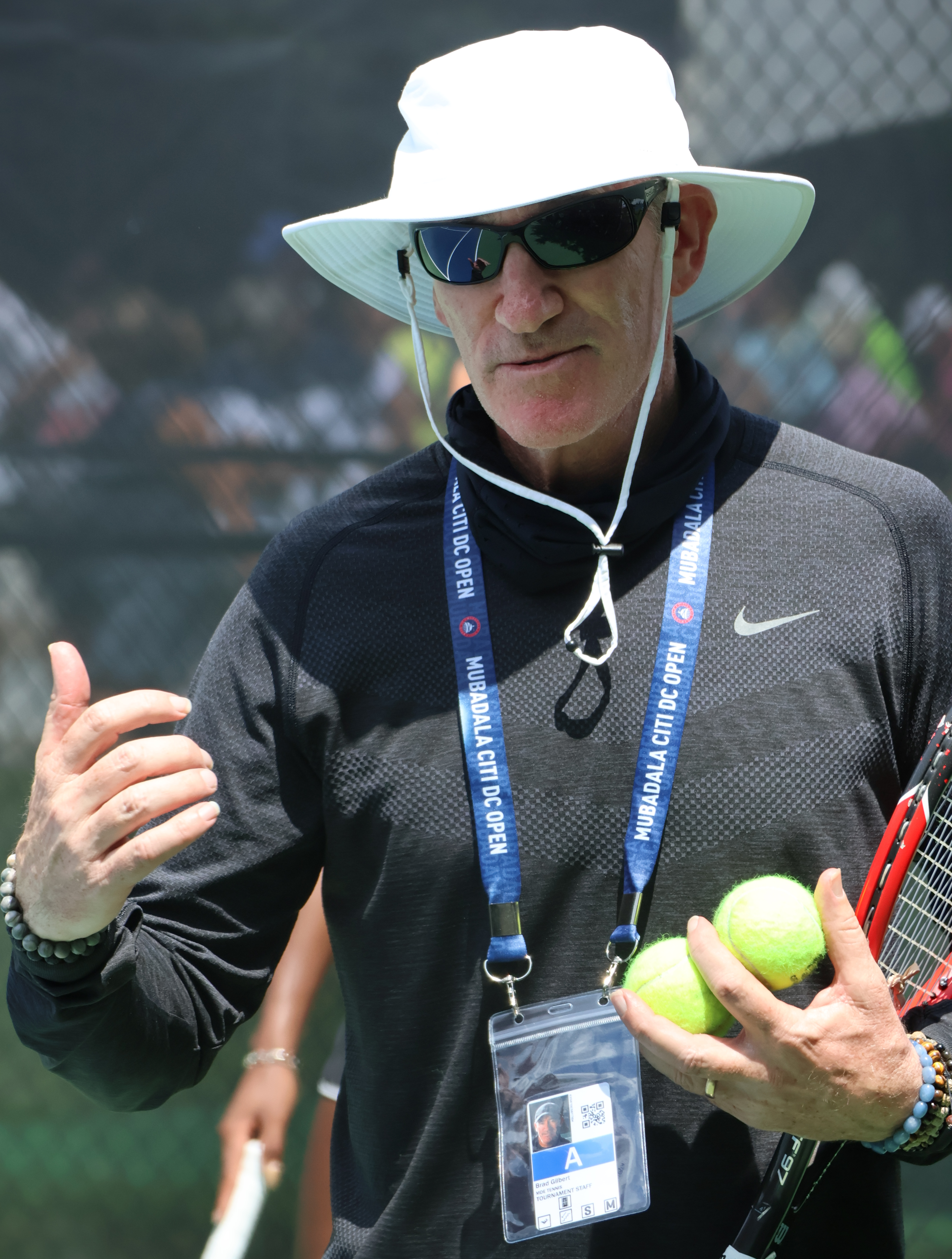
- Gilbert in 2023
- Country (sports): United States
- Residence: Malibu, California, US
- Born: August 9, 1961 (age 65) Oakland, California, US
- Height: 1.85 m (6 ft 1 in)
- Turned pro: 1982
- Retired: 1995
- Plays: Right-handed (one-handed backhand)
- College: Foothill College; Pepperdine University
- Prize money: US$5,507,973

Singles
- Career record: 519–288
- Career titles: 20
- Highest ranking: No. 4 (1 January 1990)

Grand Slam singles results
- Australian Open: 4R (1984)
- French Open: 3R (1993)
- Wimbledon: QF (1990)
- US Open: QF (1987)

Other tournaments
- Tour Finals: SF (1987)
- Grand Slam Cup: F (1990)
- WCT Finals: F (1989)
- Olympic Games: SF (1988)

Doubles
- Career record: 101–127
- Career titles: 3
- Highest ranking: No. 18 (29 September 1986)

Grand Slam doubles results
- Australian Open: 2R (1987)
- French Open: 2R (1987)
- Wimbledon: 2R (1986)
- US Open: 2R (1988)

Grand Slam mixed doubles results
- French Open: 1R (1980, 1994)

Coaching career
- Andre Agassi — 1994–2002; Andy Roddick — 2003–2004; Andy Murray — 2006–2007; Alex Bogdanovic; Kei Nishikori — 2011; Sam Querrey; Coco Gauff 2023—2024
Medal record
Olympic Games – Tennis
Bronze medal – third place	1988 Seoul	Singles
Maccabiah Games
Gold medal – first place	1981 Israel	Men's doubles
Silver medal – second place	1981 Israel	Men's singles
- Last updated on: 11 September 2022.

Brad Gilbert (born August 9, 1961) is an American former professional tennis player, tennis coach, and tennis commentator and analyst for ESPN. During his career, he won 20 singles titles and achieved a career-high singles ranking of world No. 4 in 1990, and a career-high doubles ranking of world No. 18 four years prior. He won a bronze medal at the 1988 Olympics, and both a gold medal and a silver medal at the 1981 Maccabiah Games.

Since retiring from the professional tour, he has coached several top players, most notably Andre Agassi who won six of his eight Grand Slam titles under Gilbert's tutelage. Other players he has coached include Andy Roddick, Andy Murray, Kei Nishikori and Coco Gauff.

== Early life ==
Brad Gilbert was born on August 9, 1961, to a Jewish family in Oakland, California. Brad began playing tennis at age 4 after his father, Barry Gilbert (a history teacher and owner of a real estate firm), took up the sport. Despite being undersized, Brad became the top player at Piedmont High School following in the footsteps of his older siblings, Barry Jr. and Dana, who each held the top spot on the high school's tennis team.

== Playing career ==
=== College ===
Gilbert played tennis for Foothill College, a junior college in Los Altos Hills, California, from 1980 to 1982, where he was coached by Tom Chivington. During this time, he won the California Junior College Singles Championship and the U.S. Amateur Hardcourt Championship. In 1981, Gilbert became a member of the American Junior Davis Cup team.

He competed for the US in the 1981 Maccabiah Games in Israel, losing in the men's singles finals to Israeli Shlomo Glickstein, but winning a gold medal in doubles with Jon Levine over fellow Americans Rick Meyer and Paul Bernstein.

In 1982, he transferred to Pepperdine University, playing for Allen Fox. He became an All-American and reached the finals of the 1982 NCAA Championship, losing to Mike Leach of Michigan 7–5, 6–3.

=== Professional ===
Gilbert joined the professional tour in 1982 and won his first top-level singles title later that year in Taipei. His first doubles title came at the 1985 Tel Aviv Open, with Ilie Năstase; he also won the singles championship.

Gilbert won a total of 20 top-level singles titles during his career including 1986 Pacific Coast Invitational against Aaron Krickstein, and the biggest being the Cincinnati Masters tournament in 1989. He was also runner-up in a further 20 singles events, including Cincinnati in 1990, where he lost to six-time Grand Slam champion Stefan Edberg, and the Paris Masters in 1987 and 1988.

Gilbert's most successful year on the tour was 1989, during which he won five singles titles, including Cincinnati, where he beat four future Hall of Famers to claim the title: Pete Sampras, Michael Chang, Boris Becker and Stefan Edberg.

Gilbert's best performances at Grand Slam tournaments were in the Quarterfinals of the 1987 US Open, losing to Jimmy Connors and in the quarterfinals of the 1990 Wimbledon Championships, losing to Boris Becker. He was also runner-up at the inaugural Grand Slam Cup in 1990.

Gilbert was ranked among the top-ten players in the U.S. for nine of his first ten years on the professional tour. His career win–loss record in singles play was 519–288.

Among his upsets of players ranked in the world's top 3 were his defeat of No. 2 Boris Becker, 3–6, 6–3, 6–4, in Cincinnati in 1989, No. 2 Edberg, 7–6, 6–7, 6–4, in Los Angeles in 1991, No. 3 Sampras, 6–3, 6–4, in London in 1992, and No. 3 Jim Courier, 6–4, 6–4, at Memphis in 1994, Edberg, 6–4, 2–6, 7–6, in Cincinnati in 1989, and perhaps most significantly, No. 2 John McEnroe, 5–7, 6–4, 6–1, at the Masters Grand Prix in 1985, which sent McEnroe into his first six-month break from tennis.

=== Style of play ===
Unlike many other professional players of his era, Gilbert did not have a major offensive weapon such as an overpowering serve or forehand. His best asset was his ability to keep the ball in play. He hit the ball most often at a slow but accurate pace and was sometimes called a pusher.

Gilbert kept an open stance and did not turn much during the swing at the baseline. This enabled him to control the game through oversight and tempo, despite his defensive style. He built his game around destroying his opponent's rhythm. He forced his opponent into long rallies by hitting the ball high over the net and deep into his opponent's court. If an opponent employed a slow pace, Gilbert attacked decisively, often at the net. He was one of the sport's top strategists as a player. Although he was easy to get along with outside the court, Gilbert was a fierce competitor with a sometimes annoying style of play, focusing on his opponent's weaknesses. Both his style of play and his mental approach brought him wins over the world's top players and kept him near the top 10 for six years. The title of Gilbert's 1994 nonfiction book, Winning Ugly, was a self-deprecating nod to his unorthodox but successful tennis career.

=== Davis Cup ===
Gilbert compiled a 10–5 record in Davis Cup play from 1986 to 1993, with a 7–1 record on hard courts and carpet.

=== Olympics ===
Gilbert won a bronze medal in men's singles at the 1988 Summer Olympics in Seoul.

== ATP career finals ==
=== Singles: 40 (20 titles / 20 runner-ups) ===
Legend Grand Slam Tournaments (0–0) ATP World Tour Finals (0–2) ATP Masters 1000 Series (1–3) ATP 500 Series (0–3) ATP 250 Series (19–12)	Finals by surface Hard (17–14) Clay (0–1) Grass (0–0) Carpet (3–5)	Finals by setting Outdoors (13–10) Indoors (7–10)

Result	W–L	Date	Tournament	Tier	Surface	Opponent	Score
Win	1–0	Nov 1982	Taipei, Taiwan	Grand Prix	Carpet	(United States) Craig Wittus	6–1, 6–4
Win	2–0	Aug 1984	Columbus, United States	Grand Prix	Hard	(United States) Hank Pfister	6–3, 3–6, 6–3
Loss	2–1	Sep 1984	San Francisco, United States	Grand Prix	Hard	(United States) John McEnroe	4–6, 4–6
Win	3–1	Nov 1984	Taipei, Taiwan	Grand Prix	Carpet	(Australia) Wally Masur	6–3, 6–3
Win	4–1	Jul 1985	Livingston, United States	Grand Prix	Hard	(United States) Brian Teacher	4–6, 7–5, 6–0
Win	5–1	Aug 1985	Cleveland, United States	Grand Prix	Hard	(Australia) Brad Drewett	6–3, 6–2
Loss	5–2	Sep 1985	Stuttgart, West Germany	Grand Prix	Clay	(Czechoslovakia) Ivan Lendl	4–6, 0–6
Loss	5–3	Oct 1985	Johannesburg, South Africa	Grand Prix	Hard	(United States) Matt Anger	4–6, 6–3, 3–6, 2–6
Win	6–3	Oct 1985	Tel Aviv, Israel	Grand Prix	Hard	(Israel) Amos Mansdorf	6–3, 6–2
Win	7–3	Feb 1986	Memphis, United States	Grand Prix	Hard	(Sweden) Stefan Edberg	7–5, 7–6^{(7–3)}
Win	8–3	Jul 1986	Livingston, United States	Grand Prix	Hard	(United States) Mike Leach	6–2, 6–2
Win	9–3	Oct 1986	Tel Aviv, Israel	Grand Prix	Hard	(United States) Aaron Krickstein	7–5, 6–2
Win	10–3	Oct 1986	Vienna, Austria	Grand Prix	Hard	(Czechoslovakia) Karel Nováček	3–6, 6–3, 7–5, 6–0
Loss	10–4	Aug 1987	Washington, United States	Grand Prix	Hard	(Czechoslovakia) Ivan Lendl	1–6, 0–6
Win	11–4	Oct 1987	Scottsdale, United States	Grand Prix	Hard	(United States) Eliot Teltscher	6–2, 6–2
Loss	11–5	Oct 1987	Tel Aviv, Israel	Grand Prix	Hard	(Israel) Amos Mansdorf	4–6, 6–3, 3–6, 2–6
Loss	11–6	Nov 1987	Paris, France	Grand Prix	Carpet	(United States) Tim Mayotte	6–2, 3–6, 5–7, 7–6^{(7–5)}, 3–6
Loss	11–7	Nov 1987	Johannesburg, South Africa	Grand Prix	Hard	(Australia) Pat Cash	6–7^{(7–9)}, 6–4, 6–2, 0–6, 1–6
Win	12–7	Oct 1988	Tel Aviv, Israel	Grand Prix	Hard	(United States) Aaron Krickstein	4–6, 7–6^{(7–5)}, 6–2
Loss	12–8	Oct 1988	Paris, France	Grand Prix	Carpet	(Israel) Amos Mansdorf	3–6, 2–6, 3–6
Win	13–8	Feb 1989	Memphis, United States	Grand Prix	Hard	(United States) Johan Kriek	6–2, 6–2, ret.
Loss	13–9	Mar 1989	Dallas, United States	Grand Prix	Carpet	(United States) John McEnroe	3–6, 3–6, 6–7^{(3–7)}
Loss	13–10	Jul 1989	Washington, United States	Grand Prix	Hard	(United States) Tim Mayotte	6–3, 4–6, 5–7
Win	14–10	Aug 1989	Stratton Mountain, United States	Grand Prix	Hard	(United States) Jim Pugh	7–5, 6–0
Win	15–10	Aug 1989	Livingston, United States	Grand Prix	Hard	(Australia) Jason Stoltenberg	6–4, 6–4
Win	16–10	Aug 1989	Cincinnati, United States	Grand Prix	Hard	(Sweden) Stefan Edberg	6–4, 2–6, 7–6^{(7–5)}
Win	17–10	Oct 1989	San Francisco, United States	Grand Prix	Hard	(Sweden) Anders Järryd	7–5, 6–2
Loss	17–11	Oct 1989	Orlando, United States	Grand Prix	Hard	(United States) Andre Agassi	2–6, 1–6
Win	18–11	Mar 1990	Rotterdam, Netherlands	World Series	Carpet	(Sweden) Jonas Svensson	6–1, 6–3
Win	19–11	Apr 1990	Orlando, United States	World Series	Hard	(South Africa) Christo van Rensburg	6–2, 6–1
Loss	19–12	Aug 1990	Cincinnati, United States	Masters Series	Hard	(Sweden) Stefan Edberg	1–6, 1–6
Win	20–12	Sep 1990	Brisbane, Australia	World Series	Hard	(United States) Aaron Krickstein	6–3, 6–1
Loss	20–13	Dec 1990	Munich, Germany	World Series	Carpet	(United States) Pete Sampras	3–6, 4–6, 2–6
Loss	20–14	Feb 1991	San Francisco, United States	World Series	Carpet	(Australia) Darren Cahill	2–6, 6–3, 4–6
Loss	20–15	Aug 1991	Los Angeles, United States	World Series	Hard	(United States) Pete Sampras	2–6, 7–6^{(7–5)}, 3–6
Loss	20–16	Oct 1991	Sydney, Australia	Championship Series	Hard	(Sweden) Stefan Edberg	2–6, 2–6, 2–6
Loss	20–17	Mar 1992	Scottsdale, United States	World Series	Hard	(Italy) Stefano Pescosolido	0–6, 6–1, 4–6
Loss	20–18	Feb 1993	San Francisco, United States	World Series	Hard	(United States) Andre Agassi	2–6, 7–6^{(7–4)}, 2–6
Loss	20–19	Apr 1993	Tokyo, Japan	Championship Series	Hard	(United States) Pete Sampras	2–6, 2–6, 2–6
Loss	20–20	Feb 1994	Memphis, United States	Championship Series	Hard	(United States) Todd Martin	4–6, 5–7

=== Doubles: 6 (3 titles / 3 runner-ups) ===
Legend Grand Slam Tournaments (0–0) ATP World Tour Finals (0–0) ATP Masters 1000 Series (1–0) ATP 500 Series (0–0) ATP 250 Series (2–3)	Finals by surface Hard (3–1) Clay (0–0) Grass (0–0) Carpet (0–2)	Finals by setting Outdoors (3–1) Indoors (0–2)

Result	W–L	Date	Tournament	Tier	Surface	Partner	Opponent	Score
Loss	0–1	Sep 1985	San Francisco, United States	Grand Prix	Carpet	(United States) Sandy Mayer	(United States) Paul Annacone (South Africa) Christo van Rensburg	6–3, 3–6, 4–6
Win	1–1	Oct 1985	Tel Aviv, Israel	Grand Prix	Hard	(Romania) Ilie Năstase	(South Africa) Michael Robertson (Romania) Florin Segărceanu	6–3, 6–2
Win	2–1	Feb 1986	Miami, United States	Masters Series	Hard	(United States) Vincent Van Patten	(Sweden) Stefan Edberg (Sweden) Anders Järryd	walkover
Loss	2–2	Oct 1986	Vienna, Austria	Grand Prix	Carpet	(Socialist Federal Republic of Yugoslavia) Slobodan Živojinović	(Brazil) Ricardo Acioly (Poland) Wojtek Fibak	walkover
Loss	2–3	Sep 1987	Los Angeles, United States	Grand Prix	Hard	(United States) Tim Wilkison	(United States) Kevin Curren (United States) David Pate	3–6, 4–6
Win	3–3	Apr 1992	Hong Kong, Hong Kong	World Series	Hard	(United States) Jim Grabb	(Zimbabwe) Byron Black (South Africa) Byron Talbot	6–2, 6–1

== Performance timelines ==
Key
W	F	SF	QF	#R	RR	Q#	DNQ	A	NH

(W) winner; (F) finalist; (SF) semifinalist; (QF) quarterfinalist; (#R) rounds 4, 3, 2, 1; (RR) round-robin stage; (Q#) qualification round; (DNQ) did not qualify; (A) absent; (NH) not held; (SR) strike rate (events won / competed); (W–L) win–loss record.

=== Singles ===
Tournament	1982	1983	1984	1985	1986	1987	1988	1989	1990	1991	1992	1993	1994	1995	SR	W–L	Win %
Grand Slam tournaments
Australian Open	A	1R	4R	3R	NH	3R	A	A	A	3R	1R	A	A	1R	0 / 7	6–7	46%
French Open	A	1R	2R	1R	A	2R	A	A	A	1R	1R	3R	2R	A	0 / 8	5–8	38%
Wimbledon	A	3R	3R	1R	4R	3R	A	1R	QF	3R	A	2R	2R	A	0 / 10	17–10	63%
US Open	2R	1R	2R	3R	4R	QF	2R	1R	3R	1R	4R	4R	A	A	0 / 12	20–12	63%
Win–loss	1–1	2–4	6–4	3–4	6–2	8–4	1–1	0–2	6–2	4–4	3–3	6–3	2–2	0–1	0 / 37	48–37	56%
National Representation
Summer Olympics	NH		A	Not Held			SF	Not Held			A	Not Held			0 / 1	4–1	80%
Year-end Championships
WCT Finals	Did not qualify				1R	A	SF	F	Not Held						0 / 3	3–3	50%
ATP Finals	Did not qualify			QF	A	SF	A	RR	Did not qualify						0 / 3	5–3	63%
Grand Slam Cup	Did not qualify								F	Did not qualify					0 / 1	3–1	75%
ATP Masters Series
Indian Wells	A	A	A	A	A	A	A	QF	3R	A	1R	3R	1R	A	0 / 5	6–5	55%
Miami	A	A	A	2R	3R	4R	A	A	3R	2R	2R	A	3R	1R	0 / 8	8–8	50%
Monte Carlo	A	A	2R	A	A	A	A	A	A	A	A	A	A	A	0 / 1	1–1	50%
Rome	A	A	A	A	A	A	A	A	3R	1R	A	A	A	A	0 / 2	2–2	50%
Canada	1R	1R	A	A	3R	A	A	A	2R	3R	A	1R	A	A	0 / 6	2–6	25%
Cincinnati	A	A	A	A	A	QF	3R	W	F	QF	3R	QF	1R	A	1 / 8	24–7	77%
Paris	A	A	A	A	A	F	F	QF	3R	2R	3R	1R	A	A	0 / 7	13–7	65%
Win–loss	0–1	0–1	1–1	1–1	3–2	10–3	6–2	11–2	9–6	4–5	4–4	5–4	2–3	0–1	1 / 37	56–36	61%

=== Doubles ===
Tournament	1984	1985	1986	1987	1988	1989	1990	1991	1992	SR	W–L	Win %
Grand Slam tournaments
Australian Open	1R	1R	A	2R	A	A	A	A	A	0 / 3	0–3	0%
French Open	1R	1R	A	2R	A	A	A	A	A	0 / 3	1–3	25%
Wimbledon	A	1R	2R	1R	A	1R	A	A	1R	0 / 5	1–5	17%
US Open	A	1R	1R	1R	2R	A	A	A	1R	0 / 5	1–5	17%
Win–loss	0–2	0–4	1–2	1–4	1–1	0–1	0–0	0–0	0–2	0 / 16	3–16	16%
ATP Masters Series
Miami	A	3R	W	QF	A	A	2R	A	A	1 / 4	12–3	80%
Rome	A	A	A	A	A	A	1R	QF	A	0 / 2	2–2	50%
Canada	A	A	2R	A	A	A	A	1R	A	0 / 2	1–2	33%
Cincinnati	A	A	A	QF	1R	A	A	A	2R	0 / 3	3–3	50%
Paris	A	A	A	QF	A	A	A	A	A	0 / 1	1–1	50%
Win–loss	0–0	2–1	7–1	6–3	0–1	0–0	1–2	2–2	1–1	1 / 12	19–11	63%

== Halls of Fame ==
Gilbert is a member of the USTA Northern California Hall of Fame, and the International Jewish Sports Hall of Fame.

Gilbert is also a 1999 inductee into the Pepperdine Athletics Hall of Fame.

Gilbert was inducted in 2001 into the ITA Intercollegiate Tennis Hall of Fame, and in 1996 into the Southern California Jewish Sports Hall of Fame.

Gilbert was a 2001 inductee into the Marblehead Boosters Hall of Fame.

== Coaching career ==
Gilbert retired as a player in 1995. Since 1994, he has been successful as a tennis coach. This success has often been associated with the extraordinary tactical abilities exhibited during his own matches.

=== Andre Agassi ===
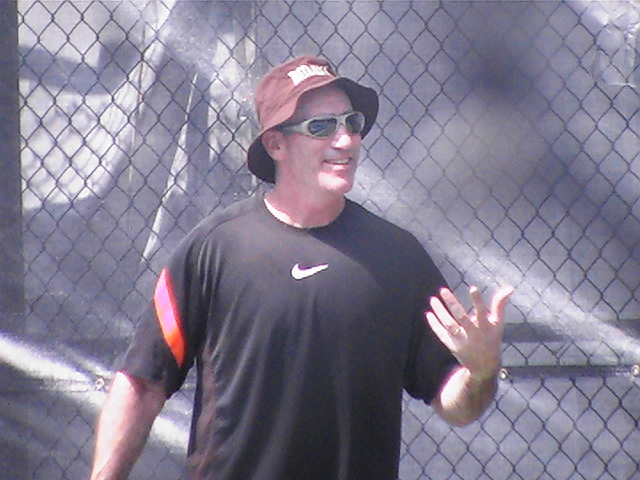
Gilbert coaching

Gilbert was the coach of Andre Agassi for eight years, from March 1994 until January 2002. Agassi won six of his eight majors when Gilbert was his coach. Agassi described Gilbert as "the greatest coach of all time".

=== Andy Roddick ===
On June 3, 2003, Gilbert became the coach of Andy Roddick, who won the 2003 US Open under Gilbert's guidance, as well as clinching the year-end world no. 1 for 2003 and reaching the 2004 Wimbledon final. They parted ways on December 12, 2004.

=== Andy Murray ===
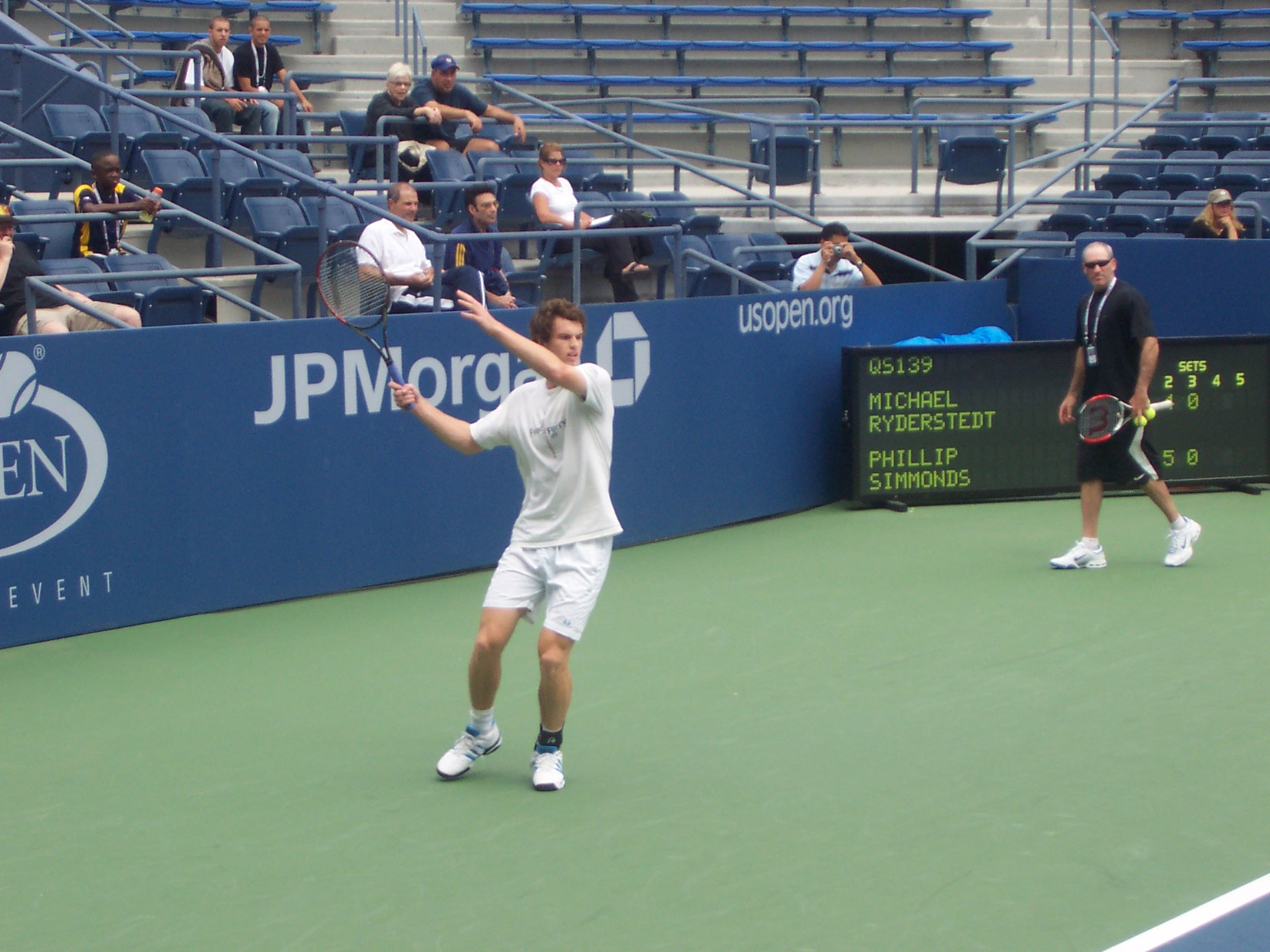
Gilbert coaching Andy Murray

On July 26, 2006, Gilbert was announced as taking over the coaching duties of Scottish player Andy Murray. As well as coaching Murray, Gilbert took part, pursuant to a 3-year deal, in other British Lawn Tennis Association programmes, including tennis camps at under-12 and under-14 levels. He also worked with the LTA's network of coaches and its high-performance clubs and academies. On November 14, 2007, after 16 months working together, Gilbert and Murray parted company. By then, Murray had reached a then career-high ranking of no. 8.

=== Alex Bogdanović ===
In November 2007 it was announced that Gilbert would work for 20 weeks in 2008 for Britain's Lawn Tennis Association, concentrating mostly on coaching Britain's no. 2, Alex Bogdanović, and others in his age group. Bogdanović said he was "unbelievably excited" at the chance of spending time with Gilbert. Roger Draper, the LTA's chief executive, said: "We have set Brad a new challenge of getting Alex into the top 100 and also 'upskilling' our coaches and inspiring the next generation to follow in Andy's footsteps."

=== Kei Nishikori ===
While still being committed to his TV items, in December 2010 it was announced that Gilbert would return to coaching, and partner with Kei Nishikori of Japan for 15 tournaments in the 2011 season. Gilbert's partnership with Nishikori concluded at the end of the 2011 season.

=== Sam Querrey ===
In February 2012, it was announced that Gilbert would work with American Sam Querrey on a trial basis in 2012.

=== Coco Gauff ===
In August 2023, Gilbert joined the team of Coco Gauff. She had a strong showing in her first tournaments since the change, winning the women's singles title at the Washington Open, the Cincinnati Masters shortly thereafter, and her first major win at the 2023 US Open. On 18 September 2024, just over two weeks after her US Open defense ended with a fourth round defeat, the pair ended their arrangement.

== Commentator and author ==
Gilbert now serves as a tennis analyst for ESPN. He is also the author of the book Winning Ugly, which gives tips on how an average player can defeat a more skilled opponent and better the average player's mental game. His second book, co-authored by James Kaplan and entitled I've Got Your Back, was published in 2005. He also served as a coach and trainer for actors Zendaya, Josh O'Connor and Mike Faist for the 2024 film Challengers.

== Personal life ==
Gilbert is Jewish and resides with his wife Kim in Malibu, California. They have three children—Zach, Julian, and Zoe.

He owns a tennis shop in Greenbrae, California called Brad Gilbert Tennis Nation. He was a close friend of tennis player and commentator Barry MacKay.

While covering Andy Murray's third-round match in the 2011 Australian Open for ESPN, Gilbert mentioned that he lives near the Olympian runner Michael Johnson and that when he was Murray's coach he introduced Johnson and Murray, who did a series of sprints together on a nearby track.

== See also ==
- List of select Jewish tennis players
