= 1986 ATP Championship =

- Date: August 18–24
- Edition: 85th
- Category: Grand Prix circuit
- Draw: 64S / 32D
- Prize money: $300,000
- Surface: Hard / outdoor
- Location: Mason, Ohio, U.S.
- Venue: Lindner Family Tennis Center

Champions

Singles
- (Sweden) Mats Wilander

Doubles
- (Australia) Mark Kratzmann / (Australia) Kim Warwick
- Cincinnati Masters

The 1986 ATP Championship, also known as the Cincinnati Open and Pringles Light Classic for sponsorship reasons, was a men's tennis tournament played on outdoor hard courts at the Lindner Family Tennis Center in Mason, Ohio, United States that was part of the 1986 Nabisco Grand Prix and the men's draw was held from August 18 through August 24, 1986. First-seeded Mats Wilander won the singles title.

== Finals ==
=== Singles ===
(Sweden) Mats Wilander defeated (United States) Jimmy Connors, 6–4, 6–1

- It was Wilander's 2nd singles title of the year and the 21st of his career.

=== Doubles ===
(Australia) Mark Kratzmann / (Australia) Kim Warwick defeated (South Africa) Christo Steyn / (South Africa) Danie Visser, 6–3, 6–4.
