= 1987 Cincinnati Open =

- Date: August 17–23, 1987
- Edition: 86th
- Category: Grand Prix circuit
- Draw: 64S / 32D
- Prize money: $300,000
- Surface: Hard / outdoor
- Location: Mason, Ohio, U.S.
- Venue: Lindner Family Tennis Center

Champions

Singles
- (Sweden) Stefan Edberg

Doubles
- (United States) Ken Flach / (United States) Robert Seguso
- Cincinnati Open

The 1987 Cincinnati Open (Also known as the Thriftway ATP Championships and Pringles Light Classic for sponsorship reasons) was a men's tennis tournament played on outdoor hard courts at the Lindner Family Tennis Center in Mason, Ohio, United States that was part of the 1987 Nabisco Grand Prix and the men's draw was held from August 17 through August 23, 1987. Second-seeded Stefan Edberg won the singles title.

== Finals ==
=== Singles ===
(Sweden) Stefan Edberg defeated (West Germany) Boris Becker, 6–4, 6–1

- It was Edberg's 5th singles title of the year and the 13th of his career.

=== Doubles ===
(United States) Ken Flach / (United States) Robert Seguso defeated (Australia) John Fitzgerald / (United States) Steve Denton, 7–5, 6–3
