= Éric Winogradsky =

French tennis player

- Country (sports): France
- Born: 22 April 1966 (age 58); Neuilly-sur-Seine, France
- Height: 1.87 m (6 ft 2 in)
- Plays: Right-handed
- Prize money: $370,072

Singles
- Career record: 22–40 (ATP, Grand Prix and Grand Slams, and in Davis Cup)
- Career titles: 0
- Highest ranking: No. 89 (6 July 1987)

Grand Slam singles results
- Australian Open: 2R (1989, 1990)
- French Open: 3R (1987)
- US Open: 2R (1987)

Doubles
- Career record: 56–64 (ATP, Grand Prix and Grand Slams, and in Davis Cup)
- Career titles: 2
- Highest ranking: No. 17 (30 April 1990)

Grand Slam doubles results
- French Open: F (1989)

Éric Winogradsky (born 22 April 1966) is a French tennis coach and a former professional player.

== Career ==
He never reached a final in singles on the ATP Tour, but was much more successful in doubles, winning two titles and finishing runner-up at the 1989 French Open.

At the 1987 French Open, Winogradsky upset Stefan Edberg in straight sets en route to the third round.

=== Coaching ===
He was Jo-Wilfried Tsonga's coach from 2004 until 2011. Since 2024, he is coaching Lucas Pouille.

== Career finals ==
=== Doubles: 4 (2–2) ===
Legend
Grand Slam (0–1)
Tennis Masters Cup (0–0)
ATP Masters Series (0–1)
ATP Tour (2–0)

Result	No.	Date	Tournament	Surface	Partner	Opponents	Score
Loss	0–1	May 1989	French Open, Paris	Clay	(Iran) Mansour Bahrami	(United States) Jim Grabb (United States) Patrick McEnroe	6–4, 2–6, 6–4, 7–6^{(7–5)}
Win	1–1	Oct 1989	Toulouse, France	Carpet (i)	(Iran) Mansour Bahrami	(United States) Todd Nelson (The Bahamas) Roger Smith	6–2, 7–6
Loss	1–2	Oct 1989	Paris, France	Carpet (i)	(Switzerland) Jakob Hlasek	(Australia) John Fitzgerald (Sweden) Anders Järryd	7–6, 6–4
Win	2–2	Jul 1990	Kitzbühel, Austria	Clay	(Spain) Javier Sánchez	(Spain) Francisco Clavet (Austria) Horst Skoff	7–6, 6–2
