= 1987 Livingston Open – Doubles =

Doubles
- 1987 Livingston Open

Final
- Champions: (United States) Gary Donnelly (United States) Greg Holmes
- Runners-up: (United States) Ken Flach (United States) Robert Seguso
- Score: 7–6, 6–3

Details
- Draw: 16
- Seeds: 4

Events
Singles	Doubles
- Livingston Open

Bob Green and Wally Masur were the defending champions, but did not participate this year.

Gary Donnelly and Greg Holmes won the title, defeating Ken Flach and Robert Seguso 7–6, 6–3 in the final.

== Seeds ==
1. (United States) Ken Flach / (United States) Robert Seguso (final)
2. (United States) Chip Hooper / (United States) Mike Leach (quarterfinals)
3. (United States) Brad Pearce / (South Africa) Christo Steyn (first round)
4. (United States) Gary Donnelly / (United States) Greg Holmes (champions)

== Draw ==
Key

- Q = Qualifier
- WC = Wild card
- LL = Lucky loser
- Alt = Alternate
- ITF = ITF entry
- PR = Protected ranking
- SR = Special ranking
- SE = Special exempt
- JE = Junior exempt
- JR = Junior Accelerator Programme entrant
- CO = College Accelerator Programme entrant
- NG = Next Gen Accelerator Program entrant
- w/o = Walkover
- r = Retired
- d = Defaulted

=== Draw ===
First round
1	(United States) K Flach (United States) R Seguso	6	7
(United States) S Denton (United States) D Dowlen	4	6
(United States) J Lapidus (United States) R Matuszewski	3	3
(United States) M Flur (United States) S Giammalva Jr.	6	6
3	(United States) B Pearce (South Africa) C Steyn	2	7	4
(United States) J Kriek (United States) B Testerman	6	6	6
(Nigeria) N Odizor (France) É Winogradsky	6	6	6
(United States) M Freeman (United States) G Layendecker	4	7	3
(United States) M Lee (United States) Peter Smith	6	6
WC	(China) Shu-Wah Liu (China) K Ma	4	3
(United States) D Goldie (United States) D Livingston	6	3	4
4	(United States) G Donnelly (United States) G Holmes	2	6	6
(Austria) A Antonitsch (West Germany) C Saceanu	4	6	1
(Canada) G Connell (United States) L Scott	6	2	6
(United States) J Gurfein (United States) M Kures	7	2	2
2	(United States) C Hooper (United States) M Leach	6	6	6

Quarterfinals
1	(United States) K Flach (United States) R Seguso	4	6	6
(United States) M Flur (United States) S Giammalva Jr.	6	3	2
(United States) J Kriek (United States) B Testerman	2	7	7
(Nigeria) N Odizor (France) É Winogradsky	6	6	5
(United States) M Lee (United States) P Smith	2	2
4	(United States) G Donnelly (United States) G Holmes	6	6
(Canada) G Connell (United States) L Scott	6	6
2	(United States) C Hooper (United States) M Leach	1	2

Semifinals
1	(United States) K Flach (United States) R Seguso	6	2	6
(United States) J Kriek (United States) B Testerman	2	6	4
4	(United States) G Donnelly (United States) G Holmes	6	6
(Canada) G Connell (United States) L Scott	3	2

Final
1	(United States) K Flach (United States) R Seguso	6	3
4	(United States) G Donnelly (United States) G Holmes	7	6
