= 1986 Player's Canadian Open – Men's doubles =

Men's doubles
- 1986 Player's Canadian Open

Final
- Champions: (United States) Chip Hooper (United States) Mike Leach
- Runners-up: (West Germany) Boris Becker (Socialist Federal Republic of Yugoslavia) Slobodan Živojinović
- Score: 6–7, 6–3, 6–3

Details
- Draw: 28
- Seeds: 8

Events
Singles	men	women
Doubles	men	women
← 1985 ·	Canadian Open	· 1987 →

Ken Flach and Robert Seguso were the defending champions, but lost in the quarterfinals to Chip Hooper and Mike Leach.

Hooper and Leach won the title by defeating Boris Becker and Slobodan Živojinović 6–7, 6–3, 6–3 in the final.

== Seeds ==
The top four seeds received a bye to the second round.

1. (United States) Ken Flach / (United States) Robert Seguso (quarterfinals)
2. (France) Guy Forget / (France) Yannick Noah (semifinals)
3. (Sweden) Stefan Edberg / (Australia) John Fitzgerald (semifinals)
4. (West Germany) Boris Becker / (Socialist Federal Republic of Yugoslavia) Slobodan Živojinović (final)
5. (United States) Scott Davis / (United States) David Pate (first round)
6. (United States) Brad Gilbert / (Switzerland) Jakob Hlasek (second round)
7. (United States) Mike De Palmer / (United States) Gary Donnelly (quarterfinals)
8. (Australia) Mark Edmondson / (United States) Sherwood Stewart (first round)

== Draw ==
=== Key ===
- Q = Qualifier
- WC = Wild card
- LL = Lucky loser
- Alt = Alternate
- SE = Special exempt
- PR = Protected ranking
- ITF = ITF entry
- JE = Junior exempt
- w/o = Walkover
- r = Retired
- d = Defaulted
- SR = Special ranking

=== Finals ===
Semifinals
(United States) Chip Hooper (United States) Mike Leach	7	6
3	(Sweden) Stefan Edberg (Australia) John Fitzgerald	6	4
4	(West Germany) Boris Becker (Socialist Federal Republic of Yugoslavia) Slobodan Živojinović	6	5	6
2	(France) Guy Forget (France) Yannick Noah	4	7	2

Final
(United States) Chip Hooper (United States) Mike Leach	6	6	6
4	(West Germany) Boris Becker (Socialist Federal Republic of Yugoslavia) Slobodan Živojinović	7	3	3

=== Top half ===
First round
(Mexico) J Lozano (United States) J Rive	6	6	4
(South Africa) C Steyn (South Africa) D Visser	7	4	6
(United States) C Hooper (United States) M Leach	6	7
(United States) S Denton (Czechoslovakia) I Lendl	4	6
(Canada) S Bonneau (Canada) A Sznajder	6	1	7
8	(Australia) M Edmondson (United States) S Stewart	2	6	6
(Nigeria) N Odizor (Australia) M Woodforde	4	6	6
(United States) M Freeman (United States) A Kohlberg	6	3	4
(India) V Amritraj (United States) L Bourne	6	2
(United States) G Layendecker (Canada) G Michibata	7	6
(United Kingdom) C Dowdeswell (Israel) A Mansdorf	6	4	2
6	(United States) B Gilbert (Switzerland) J Hlasek	4	6	6

Second round
1	(United States) K Flach (United States) R Seguso	6	6
(South Africa) C Steyn (South Africa) D Visser	3	4
(United States) C Hooper (United States) M Leach	6	6
(Canada) S Bonneau (Canada) A Sznajder	2	2
3	(Sweden) S Edberg (Australia) J Fitzgerald	2	6	7
(Nigeria) N Odizor (Australia) M Woodforde	6	3	6
(United States) G Layendecker (Canada) G Michibata	6	1	6
6	(United States) B Gilbert (Switzerland) J Hlasek	3	6	3

Quarterfinals
1	(United States) K Flach (United States) R Seguso	6	3
(United States) C Hooper (United States) M Leach	7	6
3	(Sweden) S Edberg (Australia) J Fitzgerald	6	6
(United States) G Layendecker (Canada) G Michibata	3	2

Semifinals
(United States) C Hooper (United States) M Leach	7	6
3	(Sweden) S Edberg (Australia) J Fitzgerald	6	4

=== Bottom half ===
First round
5	(United States) S Davis (United States) D Pate	1	7	3
(United States) P Fleming (United States) J McEnroe	6	6	6
(Canada) G Connell (Canada) M Greenan	6	3	4
(Chile) R Acuña (United States) B Green	1	6	6
(Australia) B Dyke (Australia) W Masur	4	4
(Australia) P Doohan (United States) T Wilkison	6	6
7	(United States) M De Palmer (United States) G Donnelly	6	6
(United States) J Letts (United States) K Richter	2	4
(United States) K Curren (United States) M Mitchell	4	6	6
(United States) S Giammalva Jr. (United States) G Holmes	6	4	4
(United States) J Arias (Mexico) L Lavalle	6	7
(Peru) C di Laura (Brazil) C Kist	3	6

Second round
(United States) P Fleming (United States) J McEnroe	7	1	4
(Chile) R Acuña (United States) B Green	6	6	6
(Australia) P Doohan (United States) T Wilkison	4	2
4	(West Germany) B Becker (Socialist Federal Republic of Yugoslavia) S Živojinović	6	6
7	(United States) M De Palmer (United States) G Donnelly	7	6
(United States) K Curren (United States) M Mitchell	5	3
(United States) J Arias (Mexico) L Lavalle	5	3
2	(France) G Forget (France) Y Noah	7	6

Quarterfinals
(Chile) R Acuña (United States) B Green	3	4
4	(West Germany) B Becker (Socialist Federal Republic of Yugoslavia) S Živojinović	6	6
7	(United States) M De Palmer (United States) G Donnelly	4	6
2	(France) G Forget (France) Y Noah	6	7

Semifinals
4	(West Germany) B Becker (Socialist Federal Republic of Yugoslavia) S Živojinović	6	5	6
2	(France) G Forget (France) Y Noah	4	7	2
