= 1986 Livingston Open – Doubles =

Doubles
- 1986 Livingston Open

Final
- Champions: (United States) Bob Green (Australia) Wally Masur
- Runners-up: (United States) Sammy Giammalva Jr. (United States) Greg Holmes
- Score: 5–7, 6–4, 6–4

Details
- Draw: 16
- Seeds: 4

Events
Singles	Doubles
- Livingston Open

Mike De Palmer and Peter Doohan were the defending champions, but did not participate this year.

Bob Green and Wally Masur won the title, defeating Sammy Giammalva Jr. and Greg Holmes 5–7, 6–4, 6–4 in the final.

== Seeds ==
1. (United States) Ken Flach / (United States) Peter Fleming (quarterfinals)
2. (United States) Brad Gilbert / (United States) Vincent Van Patten (first round)
3. (United States) Steve Denton / (Nigeria) Nduka Odizor (first round)
4. (United States) Chip Hooper / (United States) Mike Leach (semifinals, retired)

== Draw ==
Key

- Q = Qualifier
- WC = Wild card
- LL = Lucky loser
- Alt = Alternate
- ITF = ITF entry
- PR = Protected ranking
- SR = Special ranking
- SE = Special exempt
- JE = Junior exempt
- JR = Junior Accelerator Programme entrant
- CO = College Accelerator Programme entrant
- NG = Next Gen Accelerator Program entrant
- w/o = Walkover
- r = Retired
- d = Defaulted

=== Draw ===
First round
1	(United States) K Flach (United States) P Fleming	6	6
(South Africa) G Muller (United States) T Nelson	4	1
(United States) M Freeman (United States) B Teacher	6	6
(United States) K Jones (United States) J Lapidus	4	2
3	(United States) S Denton (Nigeria) N Odizor	3	6
(United States) M Davis (United States) B Schultz	6	7
(United States) S Giammalva Jr. (United States) G Holmes	6	7
(United States) B Buffington (United States) John Losito	3	6
(United States) J Blake (United States) R Hightower	6	7
(United States) M Anger (India) R Krishnan	3	5
(United States) E Korita (United States) R Meyer	4	3
4	(United States) C Hooper (United States) M Leach	6	6
(South Africa) H Herr (Ecuador) H Núñez	2	3
(United States) L Jensen (United States) P McEnroe	6	6
(United States) B Green (Australia) W Masur	6	6
2	(United States) B Gilbert (United States) V Van Patten	2	3

Quarterfinals
1	(United States) K Flach (United States) P Fleming	4	6	3
(United States) M Freeman (United States) B Teacher	6	3	6
(United States) M Davis (United States) B Schultz	3	4
(United States) S Giammalva Jr. (United States) G Holmes	6	6
(United States) J Blake (United States) R Hightower	4	6
4	(United States) C Hooper (United States) M Leach	6	7
(United States) L Jensen (United States) P McEnroe	7	6	6
(United States) B Green (Australia) W Masur	5	7	7

Semifinals
(United States) M Freeman (United States) B Teacher	6	3
(United States) S Giammalva Jr. (United States) G Holmes	7	6
4	(United States) C Hooper (United States) M Leach	6	3^{r}
(United States) B Green (Australia) W Masur	7	3

Final
(United States) S Giammalva Jr. (United States) G Holmes	7	4	4
(United States) B Green (Australia) W Masur	5	6	6
