= 1987 Livingston Open – Singles =

Singles
- 1987 Livingston Open

Final
- Champion: (United States) Johan Kriek
- Runner-up: (West Germany) Christian Saceanu
- Score: 7–6, 3–6, 6–2

Details
- Draw: 32
- Seeds: 8

Events
Singles	Doubles
- Livingston Open

Brad Gilbert was the defending champion, but did not participate this year.

First-seeded Johan Kriek won the title, defeating Christian Saceanu 7–6, 3–6, 6–2 in the final.

== Seeds ==
1. (United States) Johan Kriek (champion)
2. (Australia) Wally Masur (quarterfinals)
3. (United States) Paul Annacone (second round)
4. (United States) Robert Seguso (first round)
5. (Nigeria) Nduka Odizor (first round)
6. (United States) Ben Testerman (first round)
7. (France) Éric Winogradsky (first round)
8. (South Africa) Christo Steyn (second round)

== Draw ==
Key

- Q = Qualifier
- WC = Wild card
- LL = Lucky loser
- Alt = Alternate
- ITF = ITF entry
- PR = Protected ranking
- SR = Special ranking
- SE = Special exempt
- JE = Junior exempt
- JR = Junior Accelerator Programme entrant
- CO = College Accelerator Programme entrant
- NG = Next Gen Accelerator Program entrant
- w/o = Walkover
- r = Retired
- d = Defaulted

=== Finals ===
Semifinals
1	(United States) Johan Kriek	6	2	6
(Austria) Alex Antonitsch	3	6	4
(West Germany) Christian Saceanu	6	6
(United States) Marc Flur	3	4

Final
1	(United States) Johan Kriek	7	3	6
(West Germany) Christian Saceanu	6	6	2

=== Top half ===
First round
1	(United States) J Kriek	6	6
WC	(United States) S Cannon	1	4
Q	(United States) R Schmidt	3^{r}
(United States) R Matuszewski	1
(Canada) S Bonneau	7	6	6
WC	(United States) David Wells-Roth	5	7	3
(United States) G Layendecker	5	6	6
7	(France) É Winogradsky	7	3	4
3	(United States) P Annacone	6	6
(United States) J Lapidus	2	4
(Austria) A Antonitsch	6	7
(United States) D Goldie	4	5
(United States) M Freeman	6	6
Q	(Israel) A Naor	4	4
(United States) S Giammalva Jr.	6	3	7
6	(United States) B Testerman	4	6	5

Second round
1	(United States) J Kriek	6	6
(United States) R Matuszewski	2	2
(Canada) S Bonneau	6	7
(United States) G Layendecker	3	6
3	(United States) P Annacone	6	6	6
(Austria) A Antonitsch	7	2	7
(United States) M Freeman	3	6	6
(United States) S Giammalva Jr.	6	2	3

Quarterfinals
1	(United States) J Kriek	6	1	6
(Canada) S Bonneau	2	6	2
(Austria) A Antonitsch	0	7	6
(United States) M Freeman	6	6	4

Semifinals
1	(United States) J Kriek	6	2	6
(Austria) A Antonitsch	3	6	4

=== Bottom half ===
First round
5/Q	(Nigeria) N Odizor	4	4
(United States) K Flach	6	6
(United States) G Donnelly	3	6
(United States) G Holmes	6	7
(United States) M Leach	4	3
(United States) C Hooper	6	6
(West Germany) C Saceanu	6	6
4	(United States) R Seguso	2	3
8	(South Africa) C Steyn	6	6
(Canada) C Pridham	3	4
Q	(South Africa) H Herr	3	3
(United States) M Flur	6	6
(United States) B Pearce	6	2	2
(United States) M Kures	3	6	6
WC	(United States) J Tarango	2	7	3
2	(Australia) W Masur	6	6	6

Second round
(United States) K Flach	7	7
(United States) G Holmes	6	6
(United States) C Hooper	6	4
(West Germany) C Saceanu	7	6
8	(South Africa) C Steyn	4	1
(United States) M Flur	6	6
(United States) M Kures	6	0
2	(Australia) W Masur	7	6

Quarterfinals
(United States) K Flach	1	6	3
(West Germany) C Saceanu	6	3	6
(United States) M Flur	6	6
2	(Australia) W Masur	2	3

Semifinals
(West Germany) C Saceanu	6	6
(United States) M Flur	3	4
