= 1986 Livingston Open – Singles =

Singles
- 1986 Livingston Open

Final
- Champion: (United States) Brad Gilbert
- Runner-up: (United States) Mike Leach
- Score: 6–2, 6–2

Details
- Draw: 32
- Seeds: 8

Events
Singles	Doubles
← 1985 ·	Livingston Open	· 1987 →

Brad Gilbert was the defending champion.

Gilbert successfully defended his title, defeating Mike Leach 6–2, 6–2 in the final.

== Seeds ==
1. (United States) Tim Mayotte (first round)
2. (United States) Brad Gilbert (champion)
3. (United States) Paul Annacone (second round)
4. (United States) Matt Anger (second round)
5. (India) Ramesh Krishnan (quarterfinals)
6. (United States) Brian Teacher (first round)
7. (United States) Greg Holmes (quarterfinals)
8. (United States) Bud Schultz (first round)

== Draw ==
=== Key ===
- Q = Qualifier
- WC = Wild card
- LL = Lucky loser
- Alt = Alternate
- SE = Special exempt
- PR = Protected ranking
- ITF = ITF entry
- JE = Junior exempt
- w/o = Walkover
- r = Retired
- d = Defaulted
- SR = Special ranking

=== Finals ===
Semifinals
(United States) Mike Leach	6	6
(Australia) Wally Masur	2	4
Q	(South Africa) Christo van Rensburg	3	4
2	(United States) Brad Gilbert	6	6

Final
(United States) Mike Leach	2	2
2	(United States) Brad Gilbert	6	6

=== Top half ===
First round
1	(United States) T Mayotte	4	2
(Nigeria) N Odizor	6	6
(United States) M Leach	6	6
(United States) C Hooper	1	4
LL	(South Africa) H Herr	6	6
(United States) V Van Patten	4	1
(United States) M Freeman	4	3
7	(United States) G Holmes	6	6
4	(United States) M Anger	6	6
Q	(United States) K Jones	3	4
(United States) J Lapidus	7	6
(South Africa) G Muller	6	2
Q	(United States) E Korita	7	6
(India) V Amritraj	6	4
(Australia) W Masur	4	7	7
6	(United States) B Teacher	6	5	5

Second round
(Nigeria) N Odizor	6	3	6
(United States) M Leach	3	6	7
LL	(South Africa) H Herr	6	4	0
7	(United States) G Holmes	4	6	6
4	(United States) M Anger	2	4
(United States) J Lapidus	6	6
Q	(United States) E Korita	2	4
(Australia) W Masur	6	6

Quarterfinals
(United States) M Leach	4	7	6
7	(United States) G Holmes	6	6	4
(United States) J Lapidus	3	4
(Australia) W Masur	6	6

Semifinals
(United States) M Leach	6	6
(Australia) W Masur	2	4

=== Bottom half ===
First round
5	(India) R Krishnan	7	6
(United States) P Fleming	5	1
WC	(United States) J Blake	6	6
Q	(United States) S Denton	2	3
WC	(United States) L Jensen	4	0
Q	(South Africa) C van Rensburg	6	6
(United States) M Davis	3	6	5
3	(United States) P Annacone	6	2	7
8	(United States) B Schultz	1	1
(United States) S Giammalva Jr.	6	6
(United States) K Flach	4	4
(Chile) R Acuña	6	6
(United States) T Nelson	0	6	6
WC	(United States) P McEnroe	6	4	4
(United States) B Green	3	3
2	(United States) B Gilbert	6	6

Second round
5	(India) R Krishnan	6	6
WC	(United States) J Blake	0	3
Q	(South Africa) C van Rensburg	6	3	6
3	(United States) P Annacone	4	6	3
(United States) S Giammalva Jr.	6	6
(Chile) R Acuña	4	2
(United States) T Nelson	1	4
2	(United States) B Gilbert	6	6

Quarterfinals
5	(India) R Krishnan	4	1
Q	(South Africa) C van Rensburg	6	6
(United States) S Giammalva Jr.	3	4
2	(United States) B Gilbert	6	6

Semifinals
Q	(South Africa) C van Rensburg	3	4
2	(United States) B Gilbert	6	6
