= 1985 Livingston Open – Singles =

Singles
- 1985 Livingston Open

Final
- Champion: (United States) Brad Gilbert
- Runner-up: (United States) Brian Teacher
- Score: 4–6, 7–5, 6–0

Details
- Draw: 32
- Seeds: 8

Events
Singles	Doubles
← 1984 ·	Livingston Open	· 1986 →

Johan Kriek was the defending champion, but lost in the semifinals this year.

Brad Gilbert won the title, defeating Brian Teacher 4–6, 7–5, 6–0 in the final.

== Seeds ==
1. (United States) Johan Kriek (semifinals)
2. (United States) Brad Gilbert (champion)
3. (United States) Sammy Giammalva Jr. (quarterfinals)
4. (United Kingdom) John Lloyd (second round)
5. (United States) Paul Annacone (quarterfinals)
6. N/A
7. (United States) Bob Green (quarterfinals)
8. (United States) Marc Flur (first round)

== Draw ==
=== Key ===
- Q = Qualifier
- WC = Wild card
- LL = Lucky loser
- Alt = Alternate
- SE = Special exempt
- PR = Protected ranking
- ITF = ITF entry
- JE = Junior exempt
- w/o = Walkover
- r = Retired
- d = Defaulted
- SR = Special ranking

=== Finals ===
Semifinals
1	(United States) Johan Kriek	6	4
(United States) Brian Teacher	7	6
WC	(United States) Jim Grabb	3	3
2	(United States) Brad Gilbert	6	6

Final
(United States) Brian Teacher	6	5	0
2	(United States) Brad Gilbert	4	7	6

=== Top half ===
First round
1	(United States) J Kriek	7	6
(United States) S McCain	5	3
(United States) L Shiras	1	6	3
(South Africa) E Edwards	6	2	6
(New Zealand) K Evernden	3	6	3
(South Africa) D Visser	6	3	6
Q	(United States) M Freeman	6	6	6
8	(United States) M Flur	3	7	3
3	(United States) S Giammalva Jr.	6	6
(United States) M De Palmer	1	4
(United States) R Harmon	7	2	6
Q	(United States) J Klaparda	6	6	4
Q	(South Africa) C Honey	6	2	3
(United States) B Teacher	4	6	6
(South Africa) D Tarr	6	3	2
LL	(United States) T Cain	4	6	6

Second round
1	(United States) J Kriek	6	6
(South Africa) E Edwards	3	1
(South Africa) D Visser	6	6
Q	(United States) M Freeman	3	4
3	(United States) S Giammalva Jr.	6	6
(United States) R Harmon	0	2
(United States) B Teacher	3	6	6
LL	(United States) T Cain	6	3	2

Quarterfinals
1	(United States) J Kriek	6	6
(South Africa) D Visser	4	0
3	(United States) S Giammalva Jr.	4	3
(United States) B Teacher	6	6

Semifinals
1	(United States) J Kriek	6	4
(United States) B Teacher	7	6

=== Bottom half ===
First round
7	(United States) B Green	6	6
(United States) D Dowlen	0	3
(United States) B Schultz	6	7	6
WC	(United States) R Leach	7	6	2
WC	(United States) J Grabb	6	6
Q	(South Africa) C Steyn	4	4
(Australia) J Alexander	5	2
4	(United Kingdom) John Lloyd	7	6
5	(United States) P Annacone	7	7
(United States) J Lapidus	6	5
(United States) C Hooper	6	6
WC	(United States) P McEnroe	2	3
(United States) D Cassidy	2	6	7
(South Africa) C van Rensburg	6	3	6
(Australia) P Doohan	5	3
2	(United States) B Gilbert	7	6

Second round
7	(United States) B Green	7	6
(United States) B Schultz	6	4
WC	(United States) J Grabb	5	6	6
4	(United Kingdom) John Lloyd	7	1	4
5	(United States) P Annacone	6	4	7
(United States) C Hooper	1	6	6
(United States) D Cassidy	1	1
2	(United States) B Gilbert	6	6

Quarterfinals
7	(United States) B Green	4	4
WC	(United States) J Grabb	6	6
5	(United States) P Annacone	3	2
2	(United States) B Gilbert	6	6

Semifinals
WC	(United States) J Grabb	3	3
2	(United States) B Gilbert	6	6
