= 1986 Player's Canadian Open – Men's singles =

Men's singles
- 1986 Player's Canadian Open

Final
- Champion: (West Germany) Boris Becker
- Runner-up: (Sweden) Stefan Edberg
- Score: 6–4, 3–6, 6–3

Details
- Draw: 56
- Seeds: 16

Events
Singles	men	women
Doubles	men	women
← 1985 ·	Player's Canadian Open	· 1987 →

John McEnroe was the defending champion, but lost in the third round this year.

Boris Becker won the title, defeating Stefan Edberg 6–4, 3–6, 6–3 in the final.

== Seeds ==
1. (Czechoslovakia) Ivan Lendl (third round)
2. (West Germany) Boris Becker (champion)
3. (France) Yannick Noah (third round)
4. (Sweden) Stefan Edberg (final)
5. (United States) John McEnroe (third round)
6. (United States) Tim Mayotte (second round)
7. (United States) Brad Gilbert (third round)
8. (United States) Jimmy Arias (third round)
9. (Switzerland) Jakob Hlasek (second round)
10. (Socialist Federal Republic of Yugoslavia) Slobodan Živojinović (second round)
11. (United States) Matt Anger (first round)
12. (United States) Robert Seguso (quarterfinals)
13. (United States) Tim Wilkison (third round)
14. (United States) David Pate (first round)
15. (United States) Kevin Curren (quarterfinals)
16. (India) Ramesh Krishnan (second round)

== Draw ==
=== Key ===
- Q = Qualifier
- WC = Wild card
- LL = Lucky loser
- Alt = Alternate
- SE = Special exempt
- PR = Protected ranking
- ITF = ITF entry
- JE = Junior exempt
- w/o = Walkover
- r = Retired
- d = Defaulted
- SR = Special ranking

=== Finals ===
Semifinals
(South Africa) Christo Steyn	1	2
4	(Sweden) Stefan Edberg	6	6
(United States) Jonathan Canter	6	6
2	(West Germany) Boris Becker	7	7

Final
4	(Sweden) Stefan Edberg	4	6	3
2	(West Germany) Boris Becker	6	3	6

=== Top half ===
==== Section 1 ====
First round
Q	(Canada) W Cowan	2	2
(United States) G Holmes	6	6
(Canada) M Wostenholme	6	4
(Nigeria) N Odizor	7	6
(United States) M Leach	2	4
15	(United States) K Curren	6	6
10	(Socialist Federal Republic of Yugoslavia) S Živojinović	6	6
Q	(Australia) M Edmondson	2	4
(South Africa) C Steyn	6	7
WC	(Canada) S Bonneau	4	6
(Australia) M Woodforde	6	6
(United States) B Green	7	7

Second round
1	(Czechoslovakia) I Lendl	6	6
(United States) G Holmes	2	2
(Nigeria) N Odizor	1	4
15	(United States) K Curren	6	6
10	(Socialist Federal Republic of Yugoslavia) S Živojinović	3	6	6
(South Africa) C Steyn	6	2	7
(United States) B Green	4	1
8	(United States) J Arias	6	6

Third round
1	(Czechoslovakia) I Lendl	6	6
15	(United States) K Curren	7	7
(South Africa) C Steyn	6	6
8	(United States) J Arias	3	1

Quarterfinals
15	(United States) K Curren	6	6
(South Africa) C Steyn	7	7

==== Section 2 ====
First round
(Australia) B Dyke	4	2
Q	(United States) C Hooper	6	6
(India) V Amritraj	6	6	6
(United States) J Brown	4	7	4
(France) G Forget	3	7	3
13	(United States) T Wilkison	6	5	6
12	(United States) R Seguso	6	7
WC	(Canada) A Sznajder	3	5
(Chile) R Acuña	6	5	3
(Israel) A Mansdorf	2	7	6
WC	(United States) P McEnroe	4	5
(United States) T Nelson	6	7

Second round
4	(Sweden) S Edberg	6	1	6
Q	(United States) C Hooper	2	6	3
(India) V Amritraj	7	1^{r}
13	(United States) T Wilkison	6	2
12	(United States) R Seguso	7	3	6
(Israel) A Mansdorf	5	6	1
(United States) T Nelson	2	3
5	(United States) J McEnroe	6	6

Third round
4	(Sweden) S Edberg	6	6
13	(United States) T Wilkison	3	4
12	(United States) R Seguso	4	6	7
5	(United States) J McEnroe	6	3	5

Quarterfinals
4	(Sweden) S Edberg	6	6
12	(United States) R Seguso	1	2

==== Section 3 ====
First round
(Mexico) L Lavalle	6	1	2
(United States) S Giammalva Jr.	3	6	6
Q	(Nigeria) T Mmoh	7	1	2
(Peru) P Arraya	5	6	6
(United States) M Freeman	6	6	6
11	(United States) M Anger	7	4	2
14	(United States) D Pate	2	5
(United States) J Canter	6	7
(Canada) G Michibata	2	7	5
Q	(United States) J Blake	6	6	7
(South Africa) D Visser	6	2	6
(United States) S Davis	2	6	3

Second round
6	(United States) T Mayotte	6	4	1
(United States) S Giammalva Jr.	3	6	6
(Peru) P Arraya	0	4
(United States) M Freeman	6	6
(United States) J Canter	6	2	6
Q	(United States) J Blake	2	6	1
(South Africa) D Visser	4	4
3	(France) Y Noah	6	6

Third round
(United States) S Giammalva Jr.	4	7	3
(United States) M Freeman	6	5	6
(United States) J Canter	3	7	6
3	(France) Y Noah	6	5	4

Quarterfinals
(United States) M Freeman	6	3	3
(United States) J Canter	3	6	6

==== Section 4 ====
First round
(Czechoslovakia) M Šrejber	4	6
(United States) G Layendecker	6	7
(United States) B Schultz	4	7	7
(United States) M Davis	6	6	6
Q	(United States) J Rive	5	5
9	(Switzerland) J Hlasek	7	7
16	(India) R Krishnan	6	6
WC	(United States) P Fleming	2	3
Q	(Ecuador) RA Viver	4	6	6
(Mexico) F Maciel	6	4	7
(United States) A Krickstein	6	3	6
(Sweden) U Stenlund	3	6	3

Second round
7	(United States) B Gilbert	6	6
(United States) G Layendecker	0	4
(United States) B Schultz	6	6	6
9	(Switzerland) J Hlasek	7	4	2
16	(India) R Krishnan	4	6	3
(Mexico) F Maciel	6	1	6
(United States) A Krickstein	2	1
2	(West Germany) B Becker	6	6

Third round
7	(United States) B Gilbert	6	3	4
(United States) B Schultz	3	6	6
(Mexico) F Maciel	3	3
2	(West Germany) B Becker	6	6

Quarterfinals
(United States) B Schultz	4	6
2	(West Germany) B Becker	6	7
