= 1985 Livingston Open – Doubles =

Doubles
- 1985 Livingston Open

Final
- Champions: (United States) Mike De Palmer (Australia) Peter Doohan
- Runners-up: (South Africa) Eddie Edwards (South Africa) Danie Visser
- Score: 6–3, 6–4

Details
- Draw: 16
- Seeds: 4

Events
Singles	Doubles
- Livingston Open

Scott Davis and Ben Testerman were the defending champions, but did not participate this year.

Mike De Palmer and Peter Doohan won the title, defeating Eddie Edwards and Danie Visser 6–3, 6–4 in the final.

== Seeds ==
1. (United States) Paul Annacone / (South Africa) Christo van Rensburg (first round)
2. (United States) Steve Denton / (United States) David Dowlen (first round)
3. (United States) Mike De Palmer / (Australia) Peter Doohan (champions)
4. (South Africa) Eddie Edwards / (South Africa) Danie Visser (final)

== Draw ==
Key

- Q = Qualifier
- WC = Wild card
- LL = Lucky loser
- Alt = Alternate
- ITF = ITF entry
- PR = Protected ranking
- SR = Special ranking
- SE = Special exempt
- JE = Junior exempt
- JR = Junior Accelerator Programme entrant
- CO = College Accelerator Programme entrant
- NG = Next Gen Accelerator Program entrant
- w/o = Walkover
- r = Retired
- d = Defaulted

=== Draw ===
First round
1	(United States) P Annacone (South Africa) C van Rensburg	2	4
(South Africa) M Robertson (South Africa) D Tarr	6	6
(South Africa) C Honey (South Africa) C Steyn	7	6
(United States) D Cassidy (United States) J Grabb	6	3
3	(United States) M De Palmer (Australia) P Doohan	6	7
(United States) B Gilbert (United States) R Van't Hof	4	6
(United States) C Hooper (United States) L Shiras	7	6
(United States) R Harmon (United States) R Nixon	5	3
(United States) J Lapidus (United States) R Meyer	6	7
(United States) C Kennedy (United States) R Matuszewski	3	5
(New Zealand) K Evernden (United States) S McCain	6	2	5
4	(South Africa) E Edwards (South Africa) D Visser	4	6	7
(United States) M Flur (United States) B Schultz	3	3
(United States) M Freeman (United States) B Teacher	6	6
(Australia) J Alexander (United States) B Green	6	6	6
2	(United States) S Denton (United States) D Dowlen	7	3	2

Quarterfinals
(South Africa) M Robertson (South Africa) D Tarr	6	7	6
(South Africa) C Honey (South Africa) C Steyn	7	6	7
3	(United States) M De Palmer (Australia) P Doohan	6	6
(United States) C Hooper (United States) L Shiras	3	3
(United States) J Lapidus (United States) R Meyer	4	4
4	(South Africa) E Edwards (South Africa) D Visser	6	6
(United States) M Freeman (United States) B Teacher	6	6
(Australia) J Alexander (United States) B Green	4	4

Semifinals
(South Africa) C Honey (South Africa) C Steyn	6	4
3	(United States) M De Palmer (Australia) P Doohan	7	6
4	(South Africa) E Edwards (South Africa) D Visser	7	3	7
(United States) M Freeman (United States) B Teacher	6	6	6

Final
3	(United States) M De Palmer (Australia) P Doohan	6	6
4	(South Africa) E Edwards (South Africa) D Visser	3	4
