= 1986 Tokyo Indoor – Doubles =

Doubles
- 1986 Tokyo Indoor

Final
- Champions: (United States) Mike De Palmer (United States) Gary Donnelly
- Runners-up: (Ecuador) Andrés Gómez (Czechoslovakia) Ivan Lendl
- Score: 6–3, 7–5

Details
- Draw: 16
- Seeds: 4

Events
Singles	Doubles
- Tokyo Indoor

Ken Flach and Robert Seguso were the defending champions, but Seguso did not participate this year. Flach partnered Paul Annacone, losing in the first round.

Mike De Palmer and Gary Donnelly won the title, defeating Andrés Gómez and Ivan Lendl 6–3, 7–5 in the final.

== Seeds ==
1. (United States) Paul Annacone / (United States) Ken Flach (first round)
2. (Ecuador) Andrés Gómez / (Czechoslovakia) Ivan Lendl (final)
3. (United States) Scott Davis / (United States) David Pate (quarterfinals)
4. (United States) Mike De Palmer / (United States) Gary Donnelly (champions)

== Draw ==
Key

- Q = Qualifier
- WC = Wild card
- LL = Lucky loser
- Alt = Alternate
- ITF = ITF entry
- PR = Protected ranking
- SR = Special ranking
- SE = Special exempt
- JE = Junior exempt
- JR = Junior Accelerator Programme entrant
- CO = College Accelerator Programme entrant
- NG = Next Gen Accelerator Program entrant
- w/o = Walkover
- r = Retired
- d = Defaulted

=== Draw ===
First round
1	(United States) P Annacone (United States) K Flach	6	3
(United States) C Hooper (United States) M Leach	7	6
WC	(Japan) S Matsuoka (United States) B Scanlon	4	3
(United States) B Green (United States) R Van't Hof	6	6
4	(United States) M De Palmer (United States) G Donnelly	6	6	6
(United States) G Layendecker (Canada) G Michibata	4	7	3
(United States) S Denton (United States) D Dowlen	7	6
(Australia) B Drewett (Australia) L Warder	6	3
(United States) J Levine (Finland) O Rahnasto	6	3
(Australia) B Dyke (Australia) W Masur	7	6
(Australia) P McNamee (United States) T Witsken	1	7	3
3	(United States) S Davis (United States) D Pate	6	6	6
(West Germany) B Becker (West Germany) E Jelen	7	6
(United Kingdom) J Bates (New Zealand) B Derlin	6	1
(Australia) M Edmondson (United States) S Stewart	6	6	2
2	(Ecuador) A Gómez (Czechoslovakia) I Lendl	7	4	6

Quarterfinals
(United States) C Hooper (United States) M Leach	6	6	7
(United States) B Green (United States) R Van't Hof	7	3	6
4	(United States) M De Palmer (United States) G Donnelly	6	6
(United States) S Denton (United States) D Dowlen	3	4
(Australia) B Dyke (Australia) W Masur	6	6
3	(United States) S Davis (United States) D Pate	2	4
(West Germany) B Becker (West Germany) E Jelen	4	5
2	(Ecuador) A Gómez (Czechoslovakia) I Lendl	6	7

Semifinals
(United States) C Hooper (United States) M Leach	6	3	5
4	(United States) M De Palmer (United States) G Donnelly	4	6	7
(Australia) B Dyke (Australia) W Masur	7	3	3
2	(Ecuador) A Gómez (Czechoslovakia) I Lendl	5	6	6

Final
4	(United States) M De Palmer (United States) G Donnelly	6	7
2	(Ecuador) A Gómez (Czechoslovakia) I Lendl	3	5
