= 1986 Wimbledon Championships – Men's singles qualifying =

Men's singles qualifying
- 1986 Wimbledon Championships

Events
Singles	men	women		boys	girls
Doubles	men	women	mixed	boys	girls
WC Singles	men	women	quad
WC Doubles	men	women	quad
Legends	men	women	seniors

Qualification
Singles	men	women
Doubles	men	women	mixed
- Wimbledon Championships

Players and pairs who neither have high enough rankings nor receive wild cards may participate in a qualifying tournament held one week before the annual Wimbledon Tennis Championships.

== Seeds ==
1. (United States) Chip Hooper (qualified)
2. (Australia) Mark Kratzmann (qualified)
3. (United States) Bill Scanlon (qualifying competition, lucky loser)
4. (Socialist Federal Republic of Yugoslavia) Marko Ostoja (first round)
5. (United States) Peter Fleming (first round)
6. (Australia) Brad Drewett (qualifying competition)
7. (South Africa) Michael Robertson (qualified)
8. (United States) Jay Lapidus (qualified)
9. (United States) Larry Stefanki (qualifying competition)
10. (Israel) Shahar Perkiss (second round)
11. (South Africa) Gary Muller (first round, retired)
12. (United States) Ken Flach (qualified)
13. (United States) Marc Flur (qualified)
14. (United States) Jim Gurfein (first round)
15. (United States) Tim Gullikson (second round)
16. (United States) Brad Pearce (qualified)
17. (Sweden) Thomas Högstedt (qualifying competition)
18. (Brazil) João Soares (qualifying competition)
19. (Sweden) Peter Carlsson (first round)
20. (United States) Lloyd Bourne (first round)
21. (United States) Tomm Warneke (qualifying competition)
22. (United States) Tom Cain (qualifying competition)
23. (Brazil) Dácio Campos (first round)
24. (Israel) Shlomo Glickstein (qualified)
25. (United States) Gary Donnelly (qualifying competition)
26. (United States) Andy Kohlberg (second round)
27. (South Africa) Kevin Moir (qualified)
28. (United States) Mike Bauer (qualified)
29. (South Africa) Christo van Rensburg (qualified)
30. (Argentina) Roberto Saad (first round)
31. (Finland) Leo Palin (first round)
32. (Canada) Bill Cowan (first round)

== Qualifiers ==
1. (United States) Chip Hooper
2. (Australia) Mark Kratzmann
3. (South Africa) Christo van Rensburg
4. (South Africa) Brian Levine
5. (South Africa) Kevin Moir
6. (United States) Mike Bauer
7. (South Africa) Michael Robertson
8. (United States) Jay Lapidus
9. (Israel) Shlomo Glickstein
10. (Soviet Union) Alexander Zverev
11. (West Germany) Christian Saceanu
12. (United States) Ken Flach
13. (United States) Marc Flur
14. (Australia) Brett Custer
15. (United States) Paul Chamberlin
16. (United States) Brad Pearce

== Lucky loser ==
1. (United States) Bill Scanlon

== Qualifying draw ==
=== First qualifier ===
First round
1	(United States) Chip Hooper	6	6
(Australia) Des Tyson	4	2
(United States) Craig Kardon	6	6
(Australia) Peter Thrupp	2	4
(Nigeria) David Imonitie	4	6^{3}
(Australia) Anthony Lane	6	7^{7}
(South Africa) Royce Deppe	2	7	8
31	(Finland) Leo Palin	6	5	6

Second round
1	(United States) Chip Hooper	7^{7}	6
(United States) Craig Kardon	6^{5}	1
(Australia) Anthony Lane	3	2
(South Africa) Royce Deppe	6	6

Qualifying competition
1	(United States) Chip Hooper	7^{7}	6	3	6
(South Africa) Royce Deppe	6^{4}	3	6	3

=== Second qualifier ===
First round
2	(Australia) Mark Kratzmann	6	7^{7}
WC	(United Kingdom) Stephen Heron	1	6^{0}
(United States) Chris Dunk	6	3	5
(South Africa) Howard Herr	3	6	7
(Spain) Borja Uribe	2	7^{7}	6
(Brazil) Givaldo Barbosa	6	6^{1}	4
(Canada) Grant Connell	7^{7}	7^{7}
32	(Canada) Bill Cowan	6^{4}	6^{4}

Second round
2	(Australia) Mark Kratzmann	6	6
(South Africa) Howard Herr	1	3
(Spain) Borja Uribe	6^{5}	6^{3}
(Canada) Grant Connell	7^{7}	7^{7}

Qualifying competition
2	(Australia) Mark Kratzmann	7	6	6
(Canada) Grant Connell	5	1	1

=== Third qualifier ===
First round
3	(United States) Bill Scanlon	5	7^{7}	6
(Paraguay) Francisco González	7	6^{3}	4
(United States) Charles Strode	3	6^{7}
WC	(United States) Craig Wittus	6	7^{9}
(Australia) Michael Fancutt	6	7^{7}
WC	(United Kingdom) Ian Currie	2	6^{4}
(West Germany) Jaromir Becka	1	3
29	(South Africa) Christo van Rensburg	6	6

Second round
3	(United States) Bill Scanlon	6	6
WC	(United States) Craig Wittus	3	4
(Australia) Michael Fancutt	0	4
29	(South Africa) Christo van Rensburg	6	6

Qualifying competition
3	(United States) Bill Scanlon	2	2	4
29	(South Africa) Christo van Rensburg	6	6	6

=== Fourth qualifier ===
First round
4	(Socialist Federal Republic of Yugoslavia) Marko Ostoja	4	6^{8}
(United States) Luke Jensen	6	7^{10}
(United Kingdom) Richard Whichello	3	1
(Argentina) Gustavo Tiberti	6	6
(Sweden) Magnus Tideman	1	5
(South Africa) Brian Levine	6	7
(United States) Ted Erck	7^{7}	1	6
30	(Argentina) Roberto Saad	6^{4}	6	3

Second round
(United States) Luke Jensen	7^{8}	6
(Argentina) Gustavo Tiberti	6^{6}	4
(South Africa) Brian Levine	6	6
(United States) Ted Erck	2	1

Qualifying competition
(United States) Luke Jensen	2	6	3	4
(South Africa) Brian Levine	6	3	6	6

=== Fifth qualifier ===
First round
5	(United States) Peter Fleming	6^{6}	6^{4}
(United States) Steve Denton	7^{7}	7^{7}
(United Kingdom) Jonathan Smith	6	6
WC	(United Kingdom) Austen Brice	4	4
(Brazil) Mauro Menezes	7^{7}	7
(Australia) Marcus Smith	6^{4}	5
(India) Srinivasan Vasudevan	1	4
27	(South Africa) Kevin Moir	6	6

Second round
(United States) Steve Denton	4	3
(United Kingdom) Jonathan Smith	6	6
(Brazil) Mauro Menezes	6^{4}	4
27	(South Africa) Kevin Moir	7^{7}	6

Qualifying competition
(United Kingdom) Jonathan Smith	6	6^{8}	2	4
27	(South Africa) Kevin Moir	3	7^{10}	6	6

=== Sixth qualifier ===
First round
6	(Australia) Brad Drewett	6	7^{7}
(Australia) David Macpherson	3	6^{3}
(Australia) Mike Baroch	4	6	7
(Netherlands) Johan Vekemans	6	4	5
(Australia) Kim Warwick	6	6
(United States) Jeff Klaparda	2	3
(United States) John Sevely	3	2
28	(United States) Mike Bauer	6	6

Second round
6	(Australia) Brad Drewett	6	7^{7}
(Australia) Mike Baroch	1	6^{4}
(Australia) Kim Warwick	3	4
28	(United States) Mike Bauer	6	6

Qualifying competition
6	(Australia) Brad Drewett	6^{3}	2	4
28	(United States) Mike Bauer	7^{7}	6	6

=== Seventh qualifier ===
First round
7	(South Africa) Michael Robertson	6	1	6
(Brazil) Marcos Hocevar	4	6	2
(United States) Steve DeVries	7	2	6
(Australia) Laurie Warder	5	6	2
(United States) Rick Leach	7	6
(United States) Rill Baxter	5	4
Alt	(Mexico) Alain Lemaitre	2	2
26	(United States) Andy Kohlberg	6	6

Second round
7	(South Africa) Michael Robertson	7^{7}	6
(United States) Steve DeVries	6^{2}	3
(United States) Rick Leach	3	7	6
26	(United States) Andy Kohlberg	6	5	4

Qualifying competition
7	(South Africa) Michael Robertson	6	6	2	7
(United States) Rick Leach	2	1	6	5

=== Eighth qualifier ===
First round
8	(United States) Jay Lapidus	7^{7}	6
(West Germany) Patrik Kühnen	6^{5}	3
(Zimbabwe) Haroon Ismail	3	2
(United States) Karl Richter	6	6
(Mexico) Alfonso González	6	6
(Japan) Eiji Takeuchi	4	2
Alt	(West Germany) Heiner Moraing	6^{4}	6	2
25	(United States) Gary Donnelly	7^{7}	3	6

Second round
8	(United States) Jay Lapidus	6^{6}	6	6
(United States) Karl Richter	7^{7}	2	4
(Mexico) Alfonso González	6^{5}	4
25	(United States) Gary Donnelly	7^{7}	6

Qualifying competition
8	(United States) Jay Lapidus	7^{7}	6	6
25	(United States) Gary Donnelly	6^{4}	3	3

=== Ninth qualifier ===
First round
9	(United States) Larry Stefanki	6	6^{7}	8
(Soviet Union) Alexander Volkov	4	7^{9}	6
(Italy) Ferrante Rocchi	6	7^{7}
(Sweden) Stefan Svensson	1	6^{2}
WC	(United Kingdom) Robin Scott	2	7	0
(United States) John Ross	6	5	6
(United Kingdom) Chris Clarke	1	4
24	(Israel) Shlomo Glickstein	6	6

Second round
9	(United States) Larry Stefanki	6	7
(Italy) Ferrante Rocchi	3	5
(United States) John Ross	4	4
24	(Israel) Shlomo Glickstein	6	6

Qualifying competition
9	(United States) Larry Stefanki	4	6^{5}	3
24	(Israel) Shlomo Glickstein	6	7^{7}	6

=== Tenth qualifier ===
First round
10	(Israel) Shahar Perkiss	6	6
(Australia) Steve Wood	2	4
(Brazil) Danilo Marcelino	1	0^{r}
(United States) David Dowlen	6	0
(United States) Joey Rive	5	6^{3}
(Soviet Union) Alexander Zverev	7	7^{7}
(South Africa) Brent Pirow	6^{7}	6	9
23	(Brazil) Dácio Campos	7^{9}	4	7

Second round
10	(Israel) Shahar Perkiss	4	6^{8}
(United States) David Dowlen	6	7^{10}
(Soviet Union) Alexander Zverev	6	6
(South Africa) Brent Pirow	4	4

Qualifying competition
(United States) David Dowlen	3	5	6	6	4
(Soviet Union) Alexander Zverev	6	7	4	4	6

=== Eleventh qualifier ===
First round
11	(South Africa) Gary Muller	6	3^{r}
(United States) Chris Kennedy	3	3
(Brazil) Alexandre Hocevar	6^{5}	2
(West Germany) Christian Saceanu	7^{7}	6
(United Kingdom) Jason Goodall	4	6	4
(United States) Jim Pugh	6	4	6
(Mexico) Eduardo Vélez	3	7^{7}	3
21	(United States) Tomm Warneke	6	6^{2}	6

Second round
(United States) Chris Kennedy	2	3
(West Germany) Christian Saceanu	6	6
(United States) Jim Pugh	6^{5}	2
21	(United States) Tomm Warneke	7^{7}	6

Qualifying competition
(West Germany) Christian Saceanu	7^{7}	6	6
21	(United States) Tomm Warneke	6^{0}	3	3

=== Twelfth qualifier ===
First round
12	(United States) Ken Flach	6	7
(United Kingdom) Leighton Alfred	1	5
(Venezuela) Iñaki Calvo	5	4
(Australia) Shane Barr	7	6
(Colombia) Álvaro Jordan	6	2	6
(Australia) Patrick Flynn	2	6	3
(Italy) Michele Fioroni	1	7^{7}	4
22	(United States) Tom Cain	6	6^{4}	6

Second round
12	(United States) Ken Flach	6	6
(Australia) Shane Barr	4	4
(Colombia) Álvaro Jordan	6	3	17
22	(United States) Tom Cain	3	6	19

Qualifying competition
12	(United States) Ken Flach	7^{7}	6	7
22	(United States) Tom Cain	6^{1}	3	5

=== Thirteenth qualifier ===
First round
13	(United States) Marc Flur	7^{7}	6
(United States) Cary Stansbury	6^{2}	2
(United States) George Bezecny	5	6	3
(United States) Kelly Jones	7	3	6
(Brazil) Sérgio Ribeiro	1	7	2
WC	(United Kingdom) Martin Robinson	6	5	6
(United Kingdom) David Felgate	3	6	6
20	(United States) Lloyd Bourne	6	3	4

Second round
13	(United States) Marc Flur	6	6
(United States) Kelly Jones	3	2
WC	(United Kingdom) Martin Robinson	3	2
(United Kingdom) David Felgate	6	6

Qualifying competition
13	(United States) Marc Flur	1	6	7^{16}	7^{7}
(United Kingdom) David Felgate	6	3	6^{14}	6^{5}

=== Fourteenth qualifier ===
First round
14	(United States) Jim Gurfein	6^{2}	6	11
(United States) Scott McCain	7^{7}	4	13
(United States) Doug Stone	6	7
WC	(India) Anand Amritraj	0	5
(Argentina) Gustavo Luza	6^{10}	6^{4}
(Australia) Brett Custer	7^{12}	7^{7}
(United States) Paul Koscielski	6	5	6
19	(Sweden) Peter Carlsson	4	7	4

Second round
(United States) Scott McCain	6	6
(United States) Doug Stone	4	4
(Australia) Brett Custer	6	6
(United States) Paul Koscielski	4	1

Qualifying competition
(United States) Scott McCain	4	6	5	2
(Australia) Brett Custer	6	2	7	6

=== Fifteenth qualifier ===
First round
15	(United States) Tim Gullikson	7	7^{7}
(Spain) Carlos Homedes	5	6^{4}
(United States) Paul Chamberlin	6^{2}	6	6
(United States) Tom Fontana	7^{7}	3	1
(Australia) Charlie Fancutt	2	6^{3}
(Japan) Hitoshi Shirato	6	7^{7}
WC	(United Kingdom) David Ison	4	0
18	(Brazil) João Soares	6	6

Second round
15	(United States) Tim Gullikson	3	4
(United States) Paul Chamberlin	6	6
(Japan) Hitoshi Shirato	3	6^{2}
18	(Brazil) João Soares	6	7^{7}

Qualifying competition
(United States) Paul Chamberlin	6	7^{7}	4	7^{7}
18	(Brazil) João Soares	3	6^{2}	6	6^{3}

=== Sixteenth qualifier ===
First round
16	(United States) Brad Pearce	6^{2}	6	6
WC	(United Kingdom) Michael Appleton	7^{7}	3	2
(South Africa) Marcel van der Merwe	2	6	5
(Netherlands) Paul Lobban	6	3	7
(Mexico) Héctor Ortiz	6	7
(United Kingdom) Mark Blincow	3	5
(Italy) Alberto Paris	6^{6}	4
17	(Sweden) Thomas Högstedt	7^{8}	6

Second round
16	(United States) Brad Pearce	6	6
(Netherlands) Paul Lobban	4	4
(Mexico) Héctor Ortiz	2	2
17	(Sweden) Thomas Högstedt	6	6

Qualifying competition
16	(United States) Brad Pearce	7^{8}	6	6
17	(Sweden) Thomas Högstedt	6^{6}	4	0
