= 1986 Tokyo Indoor – Singles =

Singles
- 1986 Tokyo Indoor

Final
- Champion: (West Germany) Boris Becker
- Runner-up: (Sweden) Stefan Edberg
- Score: 7–6, 6–1

Details
- Draw: 32
- Seeds: 8

Events
Singles	Doubles
← 1985 ·	Tokyo Indoor	· 1987 →

Ivan Lendl was the defending champion, but lost in the semifinals this year.

Boris Becker won the tournament, beating Stefan Edberg in the final, 7–6, 6–1.

== Seeds ==
1. (Czechoslovakia) Ivan Lendl (semifinals)
2. (West Germany) Boris Becker (champion)
3. (Sweden) Stefan Edberg (final)
4. (United States) Jimmy Connors (semifinals)
5. (Ecuador) Andrés Gómez (second round)
6. (United States) David Pate (quarterfinals)
7. (United States) Aaron Krickstein (second round)
8. (Sweden) Ulf Stenlund (second round)

== Draw ==
=== Key ===
- Q = Qualifier
- WC = Wild card
- LL = Lucky loser
- Alt = Alternate
- SE = Special exempt
- PR = Protected ranking
- ITF = ITF entry
- JE = Junior exempt
- w/o = Walkover
- r = Retired
- d = Defaulted
- SR = Special ranking

=== Finals ===
Semifinals
1	(Czechoslovakia) Ivan Lendl	5	1
3	(Sweden) Stefan Edberg	7	6
4	(United States) Jimmy Connors	6	6	3
2	(West Germany) Boris Becker	7	2	6

Final
3	(Sweden) Stefan Edberg	6	1
2	(West Germany) Boris Becker	7	6

=== Top half ===
First round
1	(Czechoslovakia) I Lendl	6	6
WC	(Japan) S Matsuoka	1	1
(Australia) P McNamee	7	6	6
Q	(United States) V Wilder	6	7	3
(United States) S Davis	6	6
SE	(Sweden) J Carlsson	1	1
(United States) M Davis	7	3	6
7	(United States) A Krickstein	6	6	7
3	(Sweden) S Edberg	6	6
(United States) J Arias	2	2
SE	(United States) K Jones	6	6	6
(United States) J Canter	7	3	4
WC	(Japan) F Fukui	6	6
WC	(Japan) Masayoshi Takeyari	4	3
(United States) M Freeman	3	6
6	(United States) D Pate	6	7

Second round
1	(Czechoslovakia) I Lendl	6	6
(Australia) P McNamee	2	3
(United States) S Davis	7	7
7	(United States) A Krickstein	6	6
3	(Sweden) S Edberg	4	6	6
SE	(United States) K Jones	6	1	0
WC	(Japan) F Fukui	3	2
6	(United States) D Pate	6	6

Quarterfinals
1	(Czechoslovakia) I Lendl	6	6
(United States) S Davis	3	3
3	(Sweden) S Edberg	7	6
6	(United States) D Pate	6	1

Semifinals
1	(Czechoslovakia) I Lendl	5	1
3	(Sweden) S Edberg	7	6

=== Bottom half ===
First round
5	(Ecuador) A Gómez	1	6	6
(India) R Krishnan	6	4	3
(West Germany) E Jelen	7	6
Q	(United States) K Flach	6	1
Q	(United States) D Rostagno	1	1
Q	(United States) B Scanlon	6	6
(United States) M Leach	1	6	2
4	(United States) J Connors	6	3	6
8	(Sweden) U Stenlund	1	6	6
(United States) B Schultz	6	2	3
(United States) T Witsken	6	3	3
(United States) P Annacone	3	6	6
(Peru) J Yzaga	6	6
(United States) G Holmes	4	4
(United States) M Anger	3	4
2	(West Germany) B Becker	6	6

Second round
5	(Ecuador) A Gómez	4	3
(West Germany) E Jelen	6	6
Q	(United States) B Scanlon	3	6
4	(United States) J Connors	6	7
8	(Sweden) U Stenlund	1	2
(United States) P Annacone	6	6
(Peru) J Yzaga	3	2
2	(West Germany) B Becker	6	6

Quarterfinals
(West Germany) E Jelen	6	3
4	(United States) J Connors	7	6
(United States) P Annacone	2	4
2	(West Germany) B Becker	6	6

Semifinals
4	(United States) J Connors	6	6	3
2	(West Germany) B Becker	7	2	6
