= 1988 Livingston Open – Singles =

Singles
- 1988 Livingston Open

Final
- Champion: (United States) Andre Agassi
- Runner-up: (United States) Jeff Tarango
- Score: 6–2, 6–4

Details
- Draw: 32
- Seeds: 8

Events
Singles	Doubles
← 1987 ·	Livingston Open	· 1989 →

Johan Kriek was the defending champion, but did not participate this year.

Andre Agassi won the title, defeating Jeff Tarango 6–2, 6–4 in the final.

== Seeds ==
1. (United States) Andre Agassi (champion)
2. (Socialist Federal Republic of Yugoslavia) Slobodan Živojinović (quarterfinals)
3. (United States) Paul Annacone (first round)
4. (United States) Derrick Rostagno (second round)
5. (Senegal) Yahiya Doumbia (semifinals)
6. (United States) Sammy Giammalva Jr. (quarterfinals)
7. (South Africa) Barry Moir (quarterfinals)
8. (United States) Matt Anger (quarterfinals)

== Draw ==
=== Key ===
- Q = Qualifier
- WC = Wild card
- LL = Lucky loser
- Alt = Alternate
- SE = Special exempt
- PR = Protected ranking
- ITF = ITF entry
- JE = Junior exempt
- w/o = Walkover
- r = Retired
- d = Defaulted
- SR = Special ranking

=== Finals ===
Semifinals
1	(United States) Andre Agassi	6	6
5	(Senegal) Yahiya Doumbia	4	4
(Australia) Simon Youl	6	6	6
WC	(United States) Jeff Tarango	7	0	7

Final
1	(United States) Andre Agassi	6	6
WC	(United States) Jeff Tarango	2	4

=== Top half ===
First round
1	(United States) A Agassi	6	6
LL	(Mexico) E Vélez	4	4
Q	(South Africa) C Honey	2	6	4
(Belgium) L Pimek	6	3	6
(Italy) D Nargiso	7	2	3
Q	(United States) S Melville	6	6	6
WC	(United States) M Blackman	3	6	4
8	(United States) M Anger	6	4	6
4	(United States) D Rostagno	6	6
WC	(United States) T Ho	4	4
(Japan) S Matsuoka	6	0	3
(United States) M Flur	2	6	6
(United States) B Scanlon	2	6	6
(United States) J Brown	6	4	3
(Sweden) P Lindgren	0	0
5	(Senegal) Y Doumbia	6	6

Second round
1	(United States) A Agassi	6	6
(Belgium) L Pimek	4	3
Q	(United States) S Melville	4	6	1
8	(United States) M Anger	6	4	6
4	(United States) D Rostagno	6	1
(United States) M Flur	7	6
(United States) B Scanlon	1	2
5	(Senegal) Y Doumbia	6	6

Quarterfinals
1	(United States) A Agassi	6	6
8	(United States) M Anger	4	1
(United States) M Flur	4	2
5	(Senegal) Y Doumbia	6	6

Semifinals
1	(United States) A Agassi	6	6
5	(Senegal) Y Doumbia	4	4

=== Bottom half ===
First round
6	(United States) S Giammalva Jr.	4	6	7
Q	(Sweden) T Högstedt	6	4	6
(Sweden) T Svantesson	6	4	7
(Canada) G Connell	3	6	6
(New Zealand) D Lewis	2	2
Q	(Ecuador) H Núñez	6	6
(Australia) S Youl	6	6
3	(United States) P Annacone	3	3
7	(South Africa) B Moir	6	3
(United States) J Ross	7	6
WC	(United States) J Tarango	6	4	6
(United States) P Johnson	1	6	4
(Sweden) R Bergh	3	4
(United States) L Shiras	6	6
(Canada) G Michibata	6	3
2	(Socialist Federal Republic of Yugoslavia) S Živojinović	7	6

Second round
6	(United States) S Giammalva Jr.	2	6	6
(Sweden) T Svantesson	6	4	2
Q	(Ecuador) H Núñez	6	3	1
(Australia) S Youl	1	6	6
(United States) J Ross	3	4
WC	(United States) J Tarango	6	6
(United States) L Shiras	4	4
2	(Socialist Federal Republic of Yugoslavia) S Živojinović	6	6

Quarterfinals
6	(United States) S Giammalva Jr.	4	4
(Australia) S Youl	6	6
WC	(United States) J Tarango	4	7	6
2	(Socialist Federal Republic of Yugoslavia) S Živojinović	6	6	1

Semifinals
(Australia) S Youl	6	6	6
WC	(United States) J Tarango	7	0	7
