= 1988 Livingston Open – Doubles =

Doubles
- 1988 Livingston Open

Final
- Champions: (Canada) Grant Connell (Canada) Glenn Michibata
- Runners-up: (United States) Marc Flur (United States) Sammy Giammalva Jr.
- Score: 2–6, 6–4, 7–5

Details
- Draw: 16
- Seeds: 4

Events
Singles	Doubles
- Livingston Open

Gary Donnelly and Greg Holmes were the defending champions, but did not participate this year.

Grant Connell and Glenn Michibata won the title, defeating Marc Flur and Sammy Giammalva Jr. 2–6, 6–4, 7–5 in the final.

== Seeds ==
1. (Canada) Grant Connell / (Canada) Glenn Michibata (champions)
2. (United States) Marc Flur / (United States) Sammy Giammalva Jr. (final)
3. (United States) Matt Anger / (United States) Leif Shiras (quarterfinals)
4. (United States) Paul Annacone / (United States) John Ross (quarterfinals)

== Draw ==
Key

- Q = Qualifier
- WC = Wild card
- LL = Lucky loser
- Alt = Alternate
- ITF = ITF entry
- PR = Protected ranking
- SR = Special ranking
- SE = Special exempt
- JE = Junior exempt
- JR = Junior Accelerator Programme entrant
- CO = College Accelerator Programme entrant
- NG = Next Gen Accelerator Program entrant
- w/o = Walkover
- r = Retired
- d = Defaulted

=== Draw ===
First round
1	(Canada) G Connell (Canada) G Michibata	6	6
(Mexico) F Pérez Pascal (Mexico) E Vélez	2	3
(Japan) S Matsuoka (United States) D Rostagno	6	3	6
(United States) J DeFoor (United States) B Man-Son-Hing	1	6	7
4	(United States) P Annacone (United States) J Ross	6	6
(United States) J Barham (Sweden) R Bergh	3	2
(New Zealand) D Lewis (Australia) S Youl	7	7
(United States) H Endelman (United States) J Gurfein	6	6
(United States) J Brown (Senegal) Y Doumbia	6	4	3
(Belgium) L Pimek (Sweden) T Svantesson	4	6	6
(Brazil) N Aerts (United States) J Tarango	6	1
3	(United States) M Anger (United States) L Shiras	7	6
(South Africa) C Honey (United States) C Kennedy	5	7	6
(United States) P Fleming (Italy) D Nargiso	7	5	1
WC	(The Bahamas) M Knowles (United States) A Parker	4	2
2	(United States) M Flur (United States) S Giammalva Jr.	6	6

Quarterfinals
1	(Canada) G Connell (Canada) G Michibata	7	6
(United States) J DeFoor (United States) B Man-Son-Hing	5	1
4	(United States) P Annacone (United States) J Ross	7	3	4
(New Zealand) D Lewis (Australia) S Youl	6	6	6
(Belgium) L Pimek (Sweden) T Svantesson	6	6
3	(United States) M Anger (United States) L Shiras	3	4
(South Africa) C Honey (United States) C Kennedy	7	4	4
2	(United States) M Flur (United States) S Giammalva Jr.	6	6	6

Semifinals
1	(Canada) G Connell (Canada) G Michibata	4	6	6
(New Zealand) D Lewis (Australia) S Youl	6	3	4
(Belgium) L Pimek (Sweden) T Svantesson	2	3
2	(United States) M Flur (United States) S Giammalva Jr.	6	6

Final
1	(Canada) G Connell (Canada) G Michibata	2	6	7
2	(United States) M Flur (United States) S Giammalva Jr.	6	4	5
