= 1985 Livingston Open =

- Date: July 22–29
- Edition: 2nd
- Category: Grand Prix
- Draw: 32S / 16D
- Prize money: $80,000
- Surface: Hard / outdoor
- Location: Livingston, New Jersey, U.S.
- Venue: Newark Academy

Champions

Singles
- (United States) Brad Gilbert

Doubles
- (United States) Mike De Palmer / (Australia) Peter Doohan
← 1984 ·	Livingston Open	· 1986 →

The 1985 Livingston Open was a men's tennis tournament played on outdoor hard courts that was part of the 1985 Nabisco Grand Prix. It was played at Newark Academy in Livingston, New Jersey in the United States from July 22 through July 29, 1985. Second-seeded Brad Gilbert won the singles title.

== Finals ==
=== Singles ===
(United States) Brad Gilbert defeated (United States) Brian Teacher 4–6, 7–5, 6–0

- It was Gilbert's 1st singles title of the year and the 4th of his career.

=== Doubles ===
(United States) Mike De Palmer / (Australia) Peter Doohan defeated (South Africa) Eddie Edwards / (South Africa) Danie Visser 6–3, 6–4

- It was de Palmer's 1st title of the year and the 1st of his career. It was Doohan's 2nd title of the year and the 4th of his career.
