= 1987 Livingston Open =

- Date: July 13–20
- Edition: 4th
- Category: Grand Prix
- Draw: 32S / 16D
- Prize money: $89,400
- Surface: Hard / outdoor
- Location: Livingston, New Jersey, U.S.
- Venue: Newark Academy

Champions

Singles
- (United States) Johan Kriek

Doubles
- (United States) Gary Donnelly / (United States) Greg Holmes
← 1986 ·	Livingston Open	· 1988 →

The 1987 Livingston Open was a men's tennis tournament played on outdoor hard courts that was part of the 1987 Nabisco Grand Prix. It was played at Newark Academy in Livingston, New Jersey in the United States from July 13 through July 20, 1987. First-seeded Johan Kriek won the singles title.

== Finals ==
=== Singles ===
(United States) Johan Kriek defeated (West Germany) Christian Saceanu 7–6, 3–6, 6–2

- It was Kriek's only singles title of the year and the 14th of his career.

=== Doubles ===
(United States) Gary Donnelly / (United States) Greg Holmes defeated (United States) Ken Flach / (United States) Robert Seguso 7–6, 6–3

- It was Donnelly's 2nd title of the year and the 7th of his career. It was Holmes' only title of the year and the 1st of his career.
