= 1988 Livingston Open =

- Date: August 15–21
- Edition: 5th
- Category: Grand Prix
- Draw: 32S / 16D
- Prize money: $93,400
- Surface: Hard / outdoor
- Location: Livingston, New Jersey, U.S.
- Venue: Newark Academy

Champions

Singles
- (United States) Andre Agassi

Doubles
- (Canada) Grant Connell / (Canada) Glenn Michibata
← 1987 ·	Livingston Open	· 1989 →

The 1988 Livingston Open was a men's tennis tournament played on outdoor hard courts that was part of the 1988 Nabisco Grand Prix. It was played at Newark Academy in Livingston, New Jersey in the United States from August 15 through August 21, 1988. First-seeded Andre Agassi won the singles title.

== Finals ==
=== Singles ===
(United States) Andre Agassi defeated (United States) Jeff Tarango 6–2, 6–4

- It was Agassi's 6th singles title of the year and the 7th of his career.

=== Doubles ===
(Canada) Grant Connell / (Canada) Glenn Michibata defeated (United States) Marc Flur / (United States) Sammy Giammalva Jr. 2–6, 6–4, 7–5

- It was Connell's only title of the year and the 1st of his career. It was Michibata's only title of the year and the 1st of his career.
