= 1986 Livingston Open =

- Date: July 21–28
- Edition: 3rd
- Category: Grand Prix
- Draw: 32S / 16D
- Prize money: $85,000
- Surface: Hard / outdoor
- Location: Livingston, New Jersey, U.S.
- Venue: Newark Academy

Champions

Singles
- (United States) Brad Gilbert

Doubles
- (United States) Bob Green / (Australia) Wally Masur
- Livingston Open

The 1986 Livingston Open was a men's tennis tournament played on outdoor hard courts that was part of the 1986 Nabisco Grand Prix. It was played at Newark Academy in Livingston, New Jersey in the United States from July 21 through July 28, 1986. Second-seeded Brad Gilbert won his second consecutive singles title at the event.

== Finals ==
=== Singles ===
(United States) Brad Gilbert defeated (United States) Mike Leach 6–2, 6–2

- It was Gilbert's 2nd singles title of the year and the 8th of his career.

=== Doubles ===
(United States) Bob Green / (Australia) Wally Masur defeated (United States) Sammy Giammalva Jr. / (United States) Greg Holmes 5–7, 6–4, 6–4

- It was Green's only title of the year and the 1st of his career. It was Masur's 2nd title of the year and the 7th of his career.
