= Stéphane Bonneau =

Canadian tennis player

- Country (sports): Canada
- Born: December 8, 1961 (age 64) Chicoutimi, Quebec
- Height: 6 ft 2 in (188 cm)
- Plays: Right-handed
- Prize money: $50,979

Singles
- Career record: 6–18
- Highest ranking: No. 107 (July 28, 1986)

Grand Slam singles results
- Australian Open: 1R (1985)
- US Open: 1R (1986)

Doubles
- Career record: 2–5
- Highest ranking: No. 257 (August 25, 1986)

Stéphane Bonneau (born December 8, 1961) is a former professional tennis player from Canada.

Bonneau had a career singles win–loss record of 6–18 in ATP tour events. His best result was a third round appearance in the 1985 Player's Canadian Open where he defeated Tomáš Šmíd and Jakob Hlasek. His career singles best ranking was World No. 107, which he attained on July 28, 1986.

== 1980, 1981 ==
Bonneau first competed in the Player's International Canadian Open in 1980, losing 0–6, 7–6, 1–6 to Tim Gullikson. In doubles action he and partner Rick Fagel lost in the first round to the Chilean brother duo of Álvaro Fillol and Jaime Fillol, 2–6, 6–7. Bonneau's next professional tour level tournament was the 1981 edition of the tournament, in which he lost in the first round again in singles, as a wild card entry, this time to Frenchman Bernard Fritz 4–6, 1–6. (He did not compete in doubles.)

Bonneau won his first professional event at Hamilton, Canada in July 1981 on the Alcan Canadian Satellite Circuit by detesting Mark Dickson (USA) 7-6 6-7 6–3 in the final. He was also runner up at Sillery and finished second of the circuit behind Dickson, earning 18 ATP Points.

== 1983, 1984 ==
Again Bonneau did not play in another tour event for another two years, until the 1983 edition of the Player's International. This time he made the second round, defeating compatriot and qualifier Dale Power 6–2, 7–6, before succumbing to No. 2 seed Ivan Lendl 2–6, 1–6.

Bonneau turned professional in 1984 after winning the NAIA singles title at Belhaven College. In April, he competed in both singles and doubles at the Montreal Indoor Challenger, losing in the first round in singles to Matt Mitchell 4–6, 3–6, and reaching the second round (quarters) in doubles, partnering compatriot Martin Dyotte.

In August, Bonneau played his fourth Player's International, again as a wild card entrant, and lost in the first round in singles, to qualifier Andy Kohlberg, 6–2, 4–6, 4–6. In doubles he and partner Dyotte lost in the first round as well, 4–6, 2–6, to the duo of Francisco González and John Sadri.

== 1985 ==
Bonneau continued his run of contesting Canadian-only tournaments competing in the Toronto Indoor Grand Prix in February, losing in the first round in singles to Mike Leach in two tie-breaks, and not competing in doubles. A month later, he reached the quarter-finals for the first time in a tour event, the Montreal Indoor. He beat fellow wild card Doug Burke and then David Dowlen in straight sets before losing to eventual champion Kohlberg 2–6, 5–7. In doubles, he and compatriot Josef Brabenec lost in straight sets in the first round to South African Michael Robertson and New Zealander Kelly Evernden.

Bonneau competed for the first time on tour outside of Canada in April, at the San Luis Potosí Challenger in San Luis Potosí, losing in the first round in both singles (to Tomm Warneke) and doubles (partnering Burke). Then in June, he played singles at the Dortmund Challenger. Seeded for the first time, at No. 9, he lost in the first round to Peter Svensson.

Bonneau had his best tournament result at the 1985 Player's International. Again a wild card, he defeated No. 12 seed Tomáš Šmíd in three sets in the first round, future top tenner Jakob Hlasek in the second, before falling to No. 5 seed Anders Järryd in the round of 16. In doubles, he and fellow Quebecer Martin Laurendeau lost in the first round to seeded team Paul Annacone and Christo van Rensburg.

In October, Bonneau lost in the first round in singles at the Grand Prix de Tennis de Toulouse to Mark Dickson. He finished the year in Australia where he lost in the first round of the 1985 Australian Open in straight sets to John Frawley. A month later at the Melbourne Outdoor, Bonneau lost again in the first round, to World No. 184 Peter Carlsson. On December 30, he was ranked World No. 175 in singles and No. 421 in doubles.

== 1986 ==
Bonneau's first tournament of the year was again the Toronto Indoor, where he lost in the first round to Jeremy Bates. The following week he again lost in the first round, at the Lipton International, in 3 sets to Glenn Layendecker. (Bonneau had lost in qualifying but made the main draw as a 'lucky loser'.) In March, Bonneau played singles and doubles at the Rio de Janeiro Challenger, losing in the first round in doubles, partnering Guillermo Rivas, and the second round in singles, as the No. 8 seed. The following week in Brasília, he lost in the first round as the No. 7 seed, to qualifier Gustavo Luza. The week after, Bonneau again played San Luis Potosí, losing in the first round in singles but reaching the finals in doubles, for his first time on tour, partnering Venezuelan Iñaki Calvo. Bonneau and Calvo lost the final to Charles Bud Cox and Jon Levine.

Bonneau performed well on the Satellite Circuits this season, finishing second at both Mexican Circuit in April–May and Canadian Circuit in June–July 1986. In Mexico he won a circuit leg in Guadalajara by defeating Gianni Ocleppo (ITA) 6/1 6/1 and was runner up to Circuit top finisher Derek Rostagno (USA) in Monterrey and at the Masters in Puerto Vallarta. In Canada he won 2 circuit legs in Sainte-Adele and Shawinigan, both against countryman Chris Pridham in the finals. He also reached the final in Sillery but lost 3/6 7/5 7/5 to Andrew Sznajder who eventually won the Circuit.

In the summer, Bonneau played in the main draw in singles first at the Schenectady Challenger, where he reached the second round. This result coupled with his still retaining his ranking points at this point from the previous year's Player's International allowed him to reach his career singles ranking of World No. 107. In August however, Bonneau was unable to protect these points, losing in the first round of the Player's, to eventual semi-final Christo Steyn. In doubles, he and compatriot Andrew Sznajder reached the second round.

Bonneau competed in his second grand slam event singles main draw at the 1986 U.S. Open. He was soundly beaten by No. 4 seed and eventual semi-finalist Stefan Edberg, 0–6, 3–6, 0–6. Bonneau did not compete in any more tour event main draws for the year. His rankings on December 29 were World No. 184 in singles and No. 263 in doubles.

== 1987 ==
Bonneau again competed at San Luis Potosí and achieved his best result there, reaching the semi-finals, where he lost to Leonardo Lavalle. In doubles, partnering Briton Bill Cowan, Bonneau reached the second round. In late May at the Montabaur Challenger in Montabaur, he lost in the first round, to Peter Elter.

In July, Bonneau played in 5 consecutive grand prix events in the Eastern United States and Canada. At the 1987 Livingston Open, he reached the quarter-finals, knocking off David Wells-Roth and Glenn Layendecker before falling to Johan Kriek. At the Schenectady Open, he lost in the first round, to Eric Winogradsky. The following week Bonneau reached the second round of the Sovran Bank Classic, defeating Tomm Warnecke before losing to Nduka Odizor. The week after, he fell again to Kriek, in the first round of the Volvo International.

For the fifth consecutive year and the seventh overall, Bonneau played both singles and doubles at the Player's International, this time in Montreal. And for the sixth time, he lost in the first round, this time to World No. 249 Roberto Saad in straight sets. In doubles Bonneau reached the second round for a second consecutive with Sznajder. The following week, he played the Winnetka Challenger, losing in the first round in both singles and doubles. The week of the start of the U.S. Open, Bonneau played the Budapest Challenger, losing in the first round in both singles and doubles. The following week he played Thessaloniki Challenger, reaching the second round in singles and semis in doubles, partnering Steve Guy.

Three weeks later, Bonneau won his only tour singles title, the Chicoutimi Challenger, defeating Jamaican Doug Burke in the final. The 20 ranking points secured saw his ranking move from No. 169 to No. 142. The following week at the Vancouver Challenger he reached the quarters, losing to an up-and-coming Grant Connell. The week after, Bonneau played the Las Vegas Challenger, reaching the second round. In each of these three events, he lost however in the first round in doubles.

After a week off, Bonneau played the Bergen Challenger on carpet, defeating Florin Segărceanu before losing to World No. 88 Patrik Kühnen. The following week however he lost in the first round, of the Helsinki Challenger. In Helsinki however, Bonneau did reach the semi-finals in doubles, partnering Olli Rahnasto. The week after, he played in the main draw of his last tour event for 1987, singles in the Valkenswaard Challenger, and lost in the first round. Bonneau in the last rankings of the year, of December 28, was ranked World No. 171 in singles and No. 315 in doubles.

== 1988 ==
In Bonneau's first main draw action for 1988, he reached the finals of both the singles and doubles of Vilamoura Challenger in Portugal, in April. He lost the singles final to South African Barry Moir and played doubles with Fabio Silberberg. The following week in Lisbon, he lost in the first round to World No. 55 Mark Woodforde.

In May, Bonneau reached the second round of the Raleigh Challenger, defeating compatriot Martin Wostenholme before falling to John Boytim. In doubles he lost in the first round partnering Anand Amritraj. Three weeks later he again played the Montabaur Challenger, losing in singles in the first round to Jim Gurfein. The following week at the Dijon Challenger Bonneau fared better, beating Gurfein en route to reaching the quarters. In doubles he partnered Gurfein and reached the second round. This was Bonneau's last doubles tournament as a full-time member of the tour. His doubles ranking following this result was World No. 285.

In August, Bonneau played his last tournament main draw as a full-time touring pro, reaching the second round of the New Haven Challenger in singles, defeating Robbie Weiss and losing to Luke Jensen. The Monday after this tournament his singles ranking stood at World No. 230.

== Davis Cup ==
As a Davis Cup player for Canada, Bonneau lost both a doubles and singles rubber on clay in a 1981 tie held against Colombia in Bogotá, the North and Central America semi-final. Partnering Rejean Genois, he lost to the duo of Carlos Behar and Alejandro Cortes, in straight sets. Bonneau then lost to Cortes in fourth rubber in four sets. Colombia won the tie 3–2.

Bonneau won two singles matches versus the Caribbean in March 1985 on carpet in Chicoutimi, defeating Karl Hale in the second round and then Roger Smith in a dead rubber. Canada prevailed in this America Zone quarterfinal 4–1.

In the next round, held in August, also in Chicoutimi, Mexico defeated Canada 3–2 to advance to the American zone final. Bonneau lost his round 1 match-up to Francisco Maciel in four sets as well as a fifth and deciding rubber, 10–12, 1–6, 2–6 to Leonardo Lavalle.

== Post tour tennis ==
In 1989, Bonneau played the Chicoutimi Challenger in both singles and doubles. In singles he beat World No. 822 Mark Z. Jacobson in the first round, in straight sets, and lost to World No. 444 Craig Campbell in the second in three sets. In doubles, he and partner, compatriot Pierre Dufour lost their opening match to the young Quebec duo of Sébastien Lareau and Sébastien Leblanc, 3–6, 6–3, 3–6.

In 1996, at age 34, Bonneau was ranked 3rd in Quebec.
