= Marc Flur =

American tennis player

- Country (sports): United States
- Residence: Durham, North Carolina; United States
- Born: June 8, 1962 (age 63) Poughkeepsie, New York; United States
- Height: 6 ft 3 in (191 cm)
- Turned pro: 1983
- Plays: Right-handed
- College: Duke University
- Prize money: $204,967

Singles
- Career record: 38–63
- Career titles: 0
- Highest ranking: No. 71 (July 29, 1985)

Grand Slam singles results
- Australian Open: 2R (1985)
- French Open: 2R (1985)
- Wimbledon: 2R (1985)
- US Open: 2R (1987)

Doubles
- Career record: 50–67
- Career titles: 0
- Highest ranking: No. 60 (February 13, 1989)

Grand Slam doubles results
- Australian Open: 2R (1988)
- French Open: 2R (1985)
- Wimbledon: 2R (1988)
- US Open: 3R (1988)

Marc C. Flur (born June 8, 1962) is a former professional tennis player from the United States.

== Early life ==
Flur was born in New York but grew up in Vermont.

== College tennis ==
Flur played collegiate tennis for Duke University. A member of the Duke Hall of Fame, he is considered to be the greatest tennis player in the history of the school. In 1983 he won both All-American selection and the ACC Player of the Year award. He was a winner of five ACC Championships, two of them in singles.

== Tour career ==
Playing for the USA, Flur took part in all four Grand Slam tournaments in 1985 and reached the second round in three of them. This included two wins over British player Jeremy Bates. The only other time he made it past the first round was in the 1987 US Open, when he defeated Christian Saceanu in five sets. At the US Open the following year, he had his best doubles result, making the third round, with partner Sammy Giammalva, Jr. Two years earlier, the pair had been runners-up in the Livingston Open, the only Grand Prix final that Flur would ever play in. As a singles player, the furthest he went was a semi-final appearance in the 1987 Livingston Open. The only other occasion that he had three wins in a tournament was at Delray Beach in 1985. One of those victories was over world number 15 Joakim Nyström.

== Grand Prix career finals ==
=== Doubles: 1 (0–1) ===
Result	W/L	Date	Tournament	Surface	Partner	Opponents	Score
Loss	0–1	Aug 1988	Livingston, United States	Hard	(United States) Sammy Giammalva, Jr.	(Canada) Grant Connell (Canada) Glenn Michibata	6–2, 4–6, 5–7

== Challenger titles ==
=== Singles: (1) ===
No.	Year	Tournament	Surface	Opponent	Score
1.	1984	Winnetka, United States	Hard	(United States) Mike Leach	6–3, 6–4

=== Doubles: (1) ===
No.	Year	Tournament	Surface	Partner	Opponents	Score
1.	1986	New Haven, United States	Hard	(United States) Brad Pearce	(United States) Rick Leach (United States) Tim Pawsat	6–2, 6–4
