= Christian Saceanu =

German tennis player

- Native name: Christian Săceanu
- Country (sports): Germany
- Residence: Neuss, Germany
- Born: 8 July 1968 (age 57) Cluj-Napoca, Romania
- Height: 1.91 m (6 ft 3 in)
- Turned pro: 1986
- Plays: Right-handed
- Prize money: $738,632

Singles
- Career record: 71–110
- Career titles: 2; 3 Challenger, 0 Futures
- Highest ranking: No. 60 (7 March 1988)

Grand Slam singles results
- Australian Open: 4R (1988)
- French Open: 2R (1988, 1989)
- Wimbledon: 4R (1992)
- US Open: 2R (1991)

Doubles
- Career record: 43–81
- Career titles: 0; 7 Challenger, 0 Futures
- Highest ranking: No. 111 (16 October 1989)

Grand Slam doubles results
- Australian Open: 3R (1987)
- French Open: 3R (1989)
- Wimbledon: 2R (1993)

Christian Saceanu (born 8 July 1968) is a German retired tennis player who turned professional in 1986. The right-hander won two grass court singles titles (1988, Bristol and 1991, Rosmalen) in his career. Saceanu reached his highest singles ATP-ranking in March 1988 when he became the number 60 of the world.

He began playing tennis when he was nine. He was ranked No. 1 in the Romanian 14s and one year later moved with his family to West Germany where he won the German national singles title in 1986. In that same year he was ranked No. 1 in the 18s.

== ATP career finals ==
=== Singles: 3 (2 titles, 1 runner-up) ===
Legend Grand Slam Tournaments (0–0) ATP World Tour Finals (0–0) ATP World Tour Masters Series (0–0) ATP Championship Series (0–0) ATP World Series (2–1)	Finals by surface Hard (0–1) Clay (0–0) Grass (2–0) Carpet (0–0)	Finals by setting Outdoors (2–1) Indoors (0–0)

Result	W–L	Date	Tournament	Tier	Surface	Opponent	Score
Loss	0–1	Jul 1987	Livingston, United States	Grand Prix	Hard	(United States) Johan Kriek	6–7^{(4–7)}, 6–3, 2–6
Win	1–1	Jul 1988	Bristol, United Kingdom	Grand Prix	Grass	(India) Ramesh Krishnan	6–4, 2–6, 6–2
Win	2–1	Jun 1991	Rosmalen, Netherlands	World Series	Grass	(Netherlands) Michiel Schapers	6–1, 3–6, 7–5

== ATP Challenger and ITF Futures finals ==
=== Singles: 5 (3–2) ===
Legend ATP Challenger (3–2) ITF Futures (0–0)	Finals by surface Hard (1–0) Clay (0–0) Grass (1–1) Carpet (1–1)

Result	W–L	Date	Tournament	Tier	Surface	Opponent	Score
Win	1–0	Feb 1990	Croydon, United Kingdom	Challenger	Carpet	(Germany) Udo Riglewski	6–3, 6–0
Win	2–0	Jul 1990	Bristol, United Kingdom	Challenger	Grass	(France) Arnaud Boetsch	6–3, 6–7, 6–3
Win	3–0	Dec 1990	Hong Kong, Hong Kong	Challenger	Hard	(Philippines) Felix Barrientos	6–4, 6–1
Loss	3–1	Oct 1992	Cherbourg, France	Challenger	Carpet	(Sweden) Jan Apell	3–6, 7–6, 6–7
Loss	3–2	Jul 1995	Manchester, United Kingdom	Challenger	Grass	(United Kingdom) Chris Wilkinson	4–6, 4–6

=== Doubles: 12 (7–5) ===
Legend ATP Challenger (7–5) ITF Futures (0–0)	Finals by surface Hard (6–2) Clay (0–1) Grass (0–0) Carpet (1–2)

Result	W–L	Date	Tournament	Tier	Surface	Partner	Opponents	Score
Loss	0–1	Apr 1989	Guadeloupe, France	Challenger	Hard	(Germany) Patrick Baur	(Israel) Gilad Bloom (United States) Brad Pearce	4–6, 2–6
Loss	0–2	Dec 1990	British Hong Kong	Challenger	Hard	(Germany) Christian Geyer	(Australia) Neil Borwick (Kenya) Paul Wekesa	2–6, 2–6
Loss	0–3	Jan 1991	Heilbronn, Germany	Challenger	Carpet	(Netherlands) Michiel Schapers	(Italy) Diego Nargiso (Italy) Stefano Pescosolido	2–6, 2–6
Win	1–3	Oct 1992	Cherbourg, France	Challenger	Carpet	(United States) Kent Kinnear	(Netherlands) Joost Winnink (Czech Republic) Tomas Anzari	6–1, 6–4
Loss	1–4	Nov 1992	Aachen, Germany	Challenger	Carpet	(Denmark) Michael Mortensen	(South Africa) Grant Stafford (South Africa) Christo van Rensburg	1–6, 3–6
Loss	1–5	Nov 1992	Guadalajara, Mexico	Challenger	Clay	(Germany) Marc-Kevin Goellner	(South Africa) Royce Deppe (Czech Republic) David Rikl	6–7, 4–6
Win	2–5	Dec 1992	Guangzhou, China	Challenger	Hard	(United States) Kent Kinnear	(United States) Richard Matuszewski (United States) John Sullivan	6–7, 6–3, 6–4
Win	3–5	May 1993	Jerusalem, Israel	Challenger	Hard	(Israel) Gilad Bloom	(Brazil) Danilo Marcelino (Brazil) Fernando Meligeni	4–6, 6–4, 7–6
Win	4–5	Jul 1993	Aptos, United States	Challenger	Hard	(Israel) Gilad Bloom	(Italy) Cristiano Caratti (Australia) Grant Doyle	7–5, 6–3
Win	5–5	May 1995	Jerusalem, Israel	Challenger	Hard	(Germany) Dirk Dier	(France) Lionel Barthez (Germany) Patrick Baur	7–6, 7–6
Win	6–5	Sep 1995	Azores, Portugal	Challenger	Hard	(United Kingdom) Tim Henman	(Portugal) Nuno Marques (United Kingdom) Chris Wilkinson	6–2, 6–2
Win	7–5	Sep 1996	Azores, Portugal	Challenger	Hard	(Netherlands) Marcus Hilpert	(United Kingdom) Jamie Delgado (United States) Charlie Singer	6–7, 6–2, 6–4

== Performance timelines ==
Key
W	F	SF	QF	#R	RR	Q#	DNQ	A	NH

(W) winner; (F) finalist; (SF) semifinalist; (QF) quarterfinalist; (#R) rounds 4, 3, 2, 1; (RR) round-robin stage; (Q#) qualification round; (DNQ) did not qualify; (A) absent; (NH) not held; (SR) strike rate (events won / competed); (W–L) win–loss record.

=== Singles ===
Tournament	1986	1987	1988	1989	1990	1991	1992	1993	1994	1995	1996	SR	W–L	Win %
Grand Slam Tournaments
Australian Open	A	1R	4R	2R	Q1	2R	1R	1R	A	A	A	0 / 6	5–6	45%
French Open	A	A	2R	2R	A	1R	A	Q2	A	Q2	A	0 / 3	2–3	40%
Wimbledon	1R	1R	1R	1R	Q1	3R	4R	Q3	2R	Q2	A	0 / 7	6–7	46%
US Open	A	1R	A	A	A	2R	Q2	A	A	A	A	0 / 2	1–2	33%
Win–loss	0–1	0–3	4–3	2–3	0–0	4–4	3–2	0–1	1–1	0–0	0–0	0 / 18	14–18	44%
ATP Tour Masters 1000
Miami	A	A	1R	1R	A	A	1R	A	A	A	Q2	0 / 3	0–3	0%
Hamburg	1R	1R	A	A	A	A	A	A	A	A	A	0 / 2	0–2	0%
Win–loss	0–1	0–1	0–1	0–1	0–0	0–0	0–1	0–0	0–0	0–0	0–0	0 / 5	0–5	0%

=== Doubles ===
Tournament	1986	1987	1988	1989	1990	1991	1992	1993	1994	1995	SR	W–L	Win %
Grand Slam Tournaments
Australian Open	A	3R	1R	1R	1R	A	A	A	A	A	0 / 4	2–4	33%
French Open	A	A	A	3R	A	A	A	1R	A	A	0 / 2	2–2	50%
Wimbledon	A	1R	A	1R	1R	A	Q2	2R	Q2	Q1	0 / 4	1–4	20%
US Open	A	A	A	A	A	A	A	A	A	A	0 / 0	0–0	–
Win–loss	0–0	2–2	0–1	2–3	0–2	0–0	0–0	1–2	0–0	0–0	0 / 10	5–10	33%
ATP Tour Masters 1000
Miami	A	A	1R	1R	1R	A	A	A	A	A	0 / 3	0–3	0%
Hamburg	1R	1R	A	A	A	A	A	A	A	A	0 / 2	0–2	0%
Win–loss	0–1	0–1	0–1	0–1	0–1	0–0	0–0	0–0	0–0	0–0	0 / 5	0–5	0%
