= Mike De Palmer =

American tennis player (1961–2021)

- Country (sports): United States
- Born: October 17, 1961 Tampa, Florida, US
- Died: August 7, 2021 (aged 59) Knoxville, Tennessee, US
- Height: 6 ft 1 in (185 cm)
- Plays: Left-handed
- Prize money: $405,056

Singles
- Career record: 76–85
- Career titles: 0
- Highest ranking: No. 35 (February 21, 1983)

Grand Slam singles results
- Australian Open: 3R (1985)
- French Open: 3R (1983)
- Wimbledon: 3R (1983)
- US Open: 3R (1982)

Doubles
- Career record: 125–131
- Career titles: 6
- Highest ranking: No. 20 (November 3, 1986)

Grand Slam doubles results
- Australian Open: 3R (1985)
- French Open: 3R (1985)
- Wimbledon: 3R (1985, 1987, 1988)
- US Open: SF (1985)

Mike De Palmer (October 17, 1961 – August 7, 2021) was a professional tennis player from the United States.

De Palmer enjoyed most of his tennis success while playing doubles. During his career, he won six tour doubles titles and finished runner-up an additional six times. He achieved a career-high doubles ranking of world No. 20 in 1986.

DePalmer had a career high singles ranking of 35, with wins over Jimmy Connors, Vitas Gerulaitis, Mel Purcell, Peter Fleming, Peter Lundgren, Paul McNamee, Jakob Hlasek, and Tim Gullikson. He reached the singles final in Ancona, Italy, in 1982, losing to Anders Järryd in two sets.

De Palmer coached Boris Becker from August 1995 to June 1999, as well as coaching other professional tennis players.

De Palmer died in Knoxville, Tennessee, on August 7, 2021, at the age of 59 because of complications from pancreatic cancer. His father coached the tennis team at the University of Tennessee from 1981 to 1994.

== Grand Prix and WCT finals ==
=== Singles: (1 runner-up) ===
Result	W-L	Date	Tournament	Surface	Opponent	Score
Loss	0–1	Nov 1982	Ancona, Italy	Carpet (i)	(Sweden) Anders Järryd	3–6, 2–6

=== Doubles: 12 (6 titles / 6 runner-ups) ===
Result	W-L	Date	Tournament	Surface	Partner	Opponents	Score
Loss	0–1	Sep 1984	San Francisco, U.S.	Hard (i)	(United States) Sammy Giammalva Jr.	(United States) Peter Fleming (United States) John McEnroe	3–6, 4–6
Win	1–1	Jul 1985	Livingston, U.S.	Hard	(Australia) Peter Doohan	(South Africa) Eddie Edwards (South Africa) Danie Visser	6–3, 6–4
Loss	1–2	Nov 1985	Stockholm, Sweden	Hard (i)	(United States) Gary Donnelly	(France) Guy Forget (Ecuador) Andrés Gómez	3–6, 4–6
Win	2–2	Nov 1985	Vienna, Austria	Carpet (i)	(United States) Gary Donnelly	(Spain) Sergio Casal (Spain) Emilio Sánchez	6–4, 6–3
Loss	2–3	May 1986	Florence, Italy	Clay	(United States) Gary Donnelly	(Spain) Sergio Casal (Spain) Emilio Sánchez	4–6, 6–7
Loss	2–4	Sep 1986	San Francisco, U.S.	Hard (i)	(United States) Gary Donnelly	(United States) Peter Fleming (United States) John McEnroe	4–6, 6–7^{(2–7)}
Win	3–4	Oct 1986	Tokyo Indoor, Japan	Carpet (i)	(United States) Gary Donnelly	(Ecuador) Andrés Gómez (Czechoslovakia) Ivan Lendl	6–3, 7–5
Win	4–4	Oct 1986	Hong Kong, U.K.	Hard	(United States) Gary Donnelly	(Australia) Pat Cash (Australia) Mark Kratzmann	7–6, 6–7, 7–5
Win	5–4	Nov 1986	Johannesburg, South Africa	Hard (i)	(South Africa) Christo van Rensburg	(Ecuador) Andrés Gómez (United States) Sherwood Stewart	3–6, 6–2, 7–6^{(7–4)}
Loss	5–5	Mar 1987	Chicago, U.S.	Carpet (i)	(United States) Gary Donnelly	(United States) Paul Annacone (South Africa) Christo van Rensburg	3–6, 6–7^{(4–7)}
Win	6–5	May 1989	Florence, Italy	Clay	(United States) Blaine Willenborg	(Italy) Pietro Pennisi (Italy) Simone Restelli	4–6, 6–4, 6–4
Loss	6–6	Jun 1989	Bristol, England	Grass	(United States) Gary Donnelly	(United States) Paul Chamberlin (United States) Tim Wilkison	6–7, 4–6
