= Gary Donnelly =

American tennis player (born 1962)

- Country (sports): United States
- Born: June 3, 1962 (age 64) Phoenix, United States
- Height: 6 ft 3 in (1.91 m)
- Turned pro: 1983
- Retired: 2000
- Plays: Right-handed
- Prize money: $370,579

Singles
- Career record: 13–32
- Career titles: 0
- Highest ranking: No. 48 (October 11, 1986)

Grand Slam singles results
- Australian Open: 1R (1987)
- French Open: 1R (1987)
- Wimbledon: 1R (1987)
- US Open: 4R (1986)

Doubles
- Career record: 177–129
- Career titles: 8
- Highest ranking: No. 16 (November 3, 1986)

Grand Slam doubles results
- Australian Open: 3R (1987)
- French Open: SF (1987)
- Wimbledon: F (1986)
- US Open: SF (1985)

Gary Donnelly (born June 3, 1962) is a former professional tennis player from the United States.

Donnelly still lives in Phoenix with his five children and wife, where he is a club pro at the Scottsdale Arizona Inn.

Donnelly played college tennis at Arizona State University.

== Accomplishments ==
- Career high ATP singles world ranking of No. 48
- Career high ATP doubles world ranking of No. 16
- 8 ATP doubles titles
- Wimbledon doubles finals
- 2 US Open doubles semi-finals
- US Open 4th round singles
- French Open doubles semi-finals
- #2 Davis Cup Doubles Team
- World Team Tennis Champion (San Antonio Racquets)
- Tournament of Champions finals
- Player/Coach for US World Team Cup
- 1998 and 2004 Wimbledon Masters Finals
- #1 singles and doubles at Arizona State University
- Arizona State University Team Captain
- #1 Junior in Southwest Section Boys 16's and 18's
- Adidas National Advisory Staff
- 2011 Central Arizona Tennis Hall of Fame

== Grand Prix and WCT finals ==
=== Doubles (8 titles, 10 runner-ups) ===
Result	W-L	Date	Tournament	Surface	Partner	Opponents	Score
Loss	0–1	Jul 1984	Boston, U.S.	Clay	(Puerto Rico) Ernie Fernandez	(United States) Ken Flach (United States) Robert Seguso	4–6, 4–6
Win	1–1	Sep 1984	Honolulu, U.S.	Hard	(United States) Butch Walts	(United States) Mark Dickson (United States) Mike Leach	7–6, 6–4
Loss	1–2	Nov 1985	Stockholm, Sweden	Hard (i)	(United States) Mike De Palmer	(France) Guy Forget (Ecuador) Andrés Gómez	3–6, 4–6
Win	2–2	Nov 1985	Vienna, Austria	Hard (i)	(United States) Mike De Palmer	(Spain) Sergio Casal (Spain) Emilio Sánchez	6–4, 6–3
Win	3–2	Apr 1986	Bari, Italy	Clay	(Czech Republic) Tomáš Šmíd	(Spain) Sergio Casal (Spain) Emilio Sánchez	2–6, 6–4, 6–4
Loss	3–3	Apr 1986	Nice, France	Clay	(United Kingdom) Colin Dowdeswell	(Switzerland) Jakob Hlasek (Czech Republic) Pavel Složil	3–6, 6–4, 9–11
Loss	3–4	May 1986	Florence, Italy	Clay	(United States) Mike De Palmer	(Spain) Sergio Casal (Spain) Emilio Sánchez	4–6, 6–7
Loss	3–5	Jul 1986	Wimbledon, London	Grass	(United States) Peter Fleming	(Sweden) Joakim Nyström (Sweden) Mats Wilander	6–7, 3–6, 3–6
Loss	3–6	Sep 1986	San Francisco, U.S.	Carpet	(United States) Mike De Palmer	(United States) Peter Fleming (United States) John McEnroe	4–6, 6–7^{(2–7)}
Win	4–6	Oct 1986	Tokyo Indoor, Japan	Carpet	(United States) Mike De Palmer	(Ecuador) Andrés Gómez (Czech Republic) Ivan Lendl	6–3, 7–5
Win	5–6	Nov 1986	Hong Kong	Hard	(United States) Mike De Palmer	(Australia) Pat Cash (Australia) Mark Kratzmann	7–6, 6–7, 7–5
Loss	5–7	Apr 1987	Chicago, U.S.	Carpet	(United States) Mike De Palmer	(United States) Paul Annacone (South Africa) Christo van Rensburg	3–6, 6–7^{(4–7)}
Loss	5–8	May 1987	Forest Hills, U.S.	Clay	(United States) Peter Fleming	(France) Guy Forget (France) Yannick Noah	6–4, 4–6, 1–6
Win	6–8	Jul 1987	Livingston, U.S.	Hard	(United States) Greg Holmes	(United States) Ken Flach (United States) Robert Seguso	7–6, 6–3
Win	7–8	Jul 1987	Schenectady, U.S.	Hard	(South Africa) Gary Muller	(United States) Brad Pearce (United States) Jim Pugh	7–6, 6–2
Win	8–8	Aug 1987	Washington, D.C., U.S.	Hard	(United States) Peter Fleming	(Australia) Laurie Warder (United States) Blaine Willenborg	6–2, 7–6
Loss	8–9	Apr 1988	Seoul, South Korea	Hard	(United States) Jim Grabb	(United Kingdom) Andrew Castle (Argentina) Roberto Saad	7–6, 4–6, 6–7
Loss	8–10	Jun 1989	Bristol, England	Grass	(United States) Mike De Palmer	(United States) Paul Chamberlin (United States) Tim Wilkison	6–7, 4–6
