= Robert Seguso =

American tennis player

- Country (sports): United States
- Residence: Boca Raton, Florida, U.S.
- Born: May 1, 1963 (age 63) Minneapolis, Minnesota, U.S.
- Height: 6 ft 3 in (191 cm)
- Turned pro: 1983
- Retired: 1999
- Plays: Right-handed (one-handed backhand)
- Prize money: US$ 1,888,353

Singles
- Career record: 88–92
- Career titles: 0
- Highest ranking: No. 22 (March 9, 1987)

Grand Slam singles results
- Australian Open: 4R (1987)
- French Open: 3R (1986)
- Wimbledon: 4R (1985)
- US Open: 2R (1983, 1986, 1988)

Doubles
- Career record: 361–151
- Career titles: 29
- Highest ranking: No. 1 (September 9, 1985)

Grand Slam doubles results
- Australian Open: SF (1987)
- French Open: W (1987)
- Wimbledon: W (1987, 1988)
- US Open: W (1985)

Other doubles tournaments
- Tour Finals: F (1987, 1991)
Medal record
Men's tennis
Representing the United States
Olympic Games
Gold medal – first place	1988 Seoul	Men's doubles

Robert Arthur Seguso (born May 1, 1963) is a former professional tennis player from the United States. A doubles specialist, he won four Grand Slam men's doubles titles (two Wimbledon, one French Open and one US Open). He also won the men's doubles gold medal at the 1988 Olympic Games in Seoul, partnering Ken Flach. Seguso reached the world no. 1 doubles ranking in 1985. He won a total of 29 career doubles titles between 1984 and 1991.

Seguso played doubles with Flach on the U.S. Davis Cup team from 1985 to 1991, compiling a 10–2 record. He was also a member of the U.S. team that won the World Team Cup in 1985.

Before turning professional, Seguso played tennis for Southern Illinois University-Edwardsville, where he was an NCAA Division II singles finalist in 1982 and Division I doubles finalist in 1983.

Seguso married the Canadian tennis player Carling Bassett in 1987. The couple have five children – sons Holden John (born in 1988) and Ridley Jack (1991), and daughters Carling Junior (1992), Lennon Shy and Theodora.

== Grand Slam finals ==
=== Doubles (4 titles, 2 runner-ups) ===
Result	Year	Championship	Surface	Partner	Opponents	Score
Win	1985	U.S. Open	Hard	(United States) Ken Flach	(France) Henri Leconte (France) Yannick Noah	6–7^{(5–7)}, 7–6^{(7–1)}, 7–6^{(8–6)}, 6–0
Win	1987	French Open	Clay	(Sweden) Anders Järryd	(France) Guy Forget (France) Yannick Noah	6–7^{(5–7)}, 6–7^{(2–7)}, 6–3, 6–4, 6–2
Win	1987	Wimbledon	Grass	(United States) Ken Flach	(Spain) Sergio Casal (Spain) Emilio Sánchez	3–6, 6–7^{(6–8)}, 7–6^{(7–3)}, 6–1, 6–4
Loss	1987	U.S. Open	Hard	(United States) Ken Flach	(Sweden) Stefan Edberg (Sweden) Anders Järryd	6–7^{(1–7)}, 2–6, 6–4, 7–5, 6–7^{(2–7)}
Win	1988	Wimbledon (2)	Grass	(United States) Ken Flach	(Australia) John Fitzgerald (Sweden) Anders Järryd	6–4, 2–6, 6–4, 7–6^{(7–3)}
Loss	1989	U.S. Open (2)	Hard	(United States) Ken Flach	(United States) John McEnroe (Australia) Mark Woodforde	4–6, 6–4, 3–6, 3–6

== Career finals ==
=== Doubles (29 titles, 20 runner-ups) ===
Legend Grand Slam (4–2) Olympic Gold (1–0) Tennis Masters Cup (1–2) ATP Masters Series (1–1) ATP Championship Series (1–1) ATP Tour (21–14)	Titles by surface Hard (12–13) Clay (7–1) Grass (4–1) Carpet (6–5)

Result	W–L	Date	Tournament	Surface	Partner	Opponents	Score
Loss	0–1	Dec 1983	Taipei, Taiwan	Carpet	(United States) Ken Flach	(Australia) Wally Masur (Australia) Kim Warwick	6–7, 4–6
Win	1–1	Jun 1984	Rome, Italy	Clay	(United States) Ken Flach	(Australia) John Alexander (United States) Mike Leach	3–6, 6–3, 6–4
Loss	1–2	Jul 1984	Newport, United States	Grass	(United States) Ken Flach	(Australia) David Graham (Australia) Laurie Warder	4–6, 6–7
Win	2–2	Jul 1984	Boston, United States	Clay	(United States) Ken Flach	(United States) Gary Donnelly (Puerto Rico) Ernie Fernandez	6–4, 6–4
Win	3–2	Aug 1984	Indianapolis, United States	Clay	(United States) Ken Flach	(Switzerland) Heinz Günthardt (Hungary) Balázs Taróczy	7–6, 7–5
Win	4–2	Sep 1984	Los Angeles, United States	Hard	(United States) Ken Flach	(Poland) Wojtek Fibak (United States) Sandy Mayer	4–6, 6–4, 6–3
Win	5–2	Oct 1984	Hong Kong	Hard	(United States) Ken Flach	(Australia) Mark Edmondson (Australia) Paul McNamee	6–7, 6–3, 7–5
Win	6–2	Nov 1984	Taipei, Taiwan	Carpet	(United States) Ken Flach	(United States) Drew Gitlin (United States) Hank Pfister	6–1, 6–7, 6–2
Win	7–2	Jan 1985	Masters Doubles WCT, London	Carpet	(United States) Ken Flach	(Switzerland) Heinz Günthardt (Hungary) Balázs Taróczy	6–3, 3–6, 6–3, 6–0
Loss	7–3	Feb 1985	La Quinta, United States	Hard	(United States) Ken Flach	(Switzerland) Heinz Günthardt (Hungary) Balázs Taróczy	6–3, 6–7, 3–6
Win	8–3	Apr 1985	Fort Myers, United States	Hard	(United States) Ken Flach	(United States) Sammy Giammalva Jr. (United States) David Pate	3–6, 6–3, 6–3
Loss	8–4	Apr 1985	Chicago, United States	Carpet	(United States) Ken Flach	(United States) Johan Kriek (France) Yannick Noah	6–3, 6–4, 5–7, 1–6, 4–6
Win	9–4	May 1985	Forest Hills, United States	Clay	(United States) Ken Flach	(Brazil) Givaldo Barbosa (Brazil) Ivan Kley	7–5, 6–2
Loss	9–5	May 1985	Rome, Italy	Clay	(United States) Ken Flach	(Sweden) Anders Järryd (Sweden) Mats Wilander	6–4, 3–6, 2–6
Win	10–5	Jun 1985	London/Queen's Club, UK	Grass	(United States) Ken Flach	(Australia) Pat Cash (Australia) John Fitzgerald	3–6, 6–3, 16–14
Win	11–5	Jul 1985	Indianapolis, United States	Clay	(United States) Ken Flach	(Czechoslovakia) Pavel Složil (Australia) Kim Warwick	6–4, 6–4
Loss	11–6	Aug 1985	Stratton Mountain, United States	Hard	(United States) Ken Flach	(United States) Scott Davis (United States) David Pate	6–3, 6–7, 6–7
Win	12–6	Aug 1985	Montreal, Canada	Hard	(United States) Ken Flach	(Sweden) Stefan Edberg (Sweden) Anders Järryd	5–7, 7–6, 6–3
Win	13–6	Sep 1985	U.S. Open, New York	Hard	(United States) Ken Flach	(France) Henri Leconte (France) Yannick Noah	6–7, 7–6, 7–6, 6–0
Win	14–6	Oct 1985	Tokyo Indoor, Japan	Carpet	(United States) Ken Flach	(United States) Scott Davis (United States) David Pate	4–6, 6–3, 7–6
Win	15–6	Feb 1986	Memphis, United States	Carpet	(United States) Ken Flach	(France) Guy Forget (Sweden) Anders Järryd	6–4, 4–6, 7–6
Win	16–6	Mar 1986	Chicago, United States	Carpet	(United States) Ken Flach	(South Africa) Eddie Edwards (Paraguay) Francisco González	6–0, 7–5
Loss	16–7	Mar 1987	Miami, United States	Hard	(United States) Ken Flach	(United States) Paul Annacone (South Africa) Christo van Rensburg	2–6, 4–6, 4–6
Win	17–7	Jun 1987	French Open, Paris	Clay	(Sweden) Anders Järryd	(France) Guy Forget (France) Yannick Noah	6–7, 6–7, 6–3, 6–4, 6–2
Win	18–7	Jul 1987	Wimbledon, London	Grass	(United States) Ken Flach	(Spain) Sergio Casal (Spain) Emilio Sánchez	3–6, 6–7, 7–6, 6–1, 6–4
Loss	18–8	Jul 1987	Livingston, United States	Hard	(United States) Ken Flach	(United States) Gary Donnelly (United States) Greg Holmes	6–7, 3–6
Win	19–8	Aug 1987	Cincinnati, United States	Hard	(United States) Ken Flach	(United States) Steve Denton (Australia) John Fitzgerald	7–5, 6–3
Loss	19–9	Sep 1987	U.S. Open, New York	Hard	(United States) Ken Flach	(Sweden) Stefan Edberg (Sweden) Anders Järryd	6–7, 2–6, 6–4, 7–5, 6–7
Loss	19–10	Oct 1987	Sydney Indoor, Australia	Hard (i)	(West Germany) Boris Becker	(Australia) Darren Cahill (Australia) Mark Kratzmann	3–6, 2–6
Loss	19–11	Nov 1987	Wembley, UK	Carpet	(United States) Ken Flach	(Czechoslovakia) Miloslav Mečíř (Czechoslovakia) Tomáš Šmíd	5–7, 4–6
Loss	19–12	Dec 1987	Masters Doubles, London	Carpet	(United States) Ken Flach	(Czechoslovakia) Miloslav Mečíř (Czechoslovakia) Tomáš Šmíd	4–6, 5–7, 7–6, 3–6
Loss	19–13	Mar 1988	Miami, United States	Hard	(United States) Ken Flach	(Australia) John Fitzgerald (Sweden) Anders Järryd	6–7, 1–6, 5–7
Win	20–13	Jun 1988	London/Queen's Club, UK	Grass	(United States) Ken Flach	(South Africa) Pieter Aldrich (South Africa) Danie Visser	6–2, 7–6
Win	21–13	Jul 1988	Wimbledon, London	Grass	(United States) Ken Flach	(Australia) John Fitzgerald (Sweden) Anders Järryd	6–4, 2–6, 6–4, 7–6
Loss	21–14	Aug 1988	Indianapolis, United States	Hard	(United States) Ken Flach	(United States) Rick Leach (United States) Jim Pugh	4–6, 3–6
Win	22–14	Aug 1988	Toronto, Canada	Hard	(United States) Ken Flach	(United Kingdom) Andrew Castle (United States) Tim Wilkison	7–6, 6–3
Win	23–14	Sep 1988	Seoul, South Korea	Hard	(United States) Ken Flach	(Spain) Sergio Casal (Spain) Emilio Sánchez	6–3, 6–4, 6–7, 6–7, 9–7
Win	24–14	Nov 1988	Wembley, UK	Carpet	(United States) Ken Flach	(United States) Martin Davis (Australia) Brad Drewett	7–5, 6–2
Loss	24–15	Nov 1988	Detroit, United States	Carpet	(United States) Ken Flach	(United States) Rick Leach (United States) Jim Pugh	4–6, 1–6
Win	25–15	Apr 1989	Tokyo Outdoor, Japan	Hard	(United States) Ken Flach	(United States) Kevin Curren (United States) David Pate	7–6, 7–6
Win	26–15	Aug 1989	Cincinnati, United States	Hard	(United States) Ken Flach	(South Africa) Pieter Aldrich (South Africa) Danie Visser	6–4, 6–4
Loss	26–16	Sep 1989	U.S. Open, New York	Hard	(United States) Ken Flach	(United States) John McEnroe (Australia) Mark Woodforde	4–6, 6–4, 3–6, 3–6
Loss	26–17	Oct 1989	Orlando, United States	Hard	(United States) Ken Flach	(United States) Scott Davis (United States) Tim Pawsat	5–7, 7–5, 4–6
Loss	26–18	Mar 1991	Miami, United States	Hard	(United States) Ken Flach	(South Africa) Wayne Ferreira (South Africa) Piet Norval	7–5, 6–7, 2–6
Win	27–18	Ma 1991	Tampa, United States	Clay	(United States) Ken Flach	(United States) David Pate (United States) Richey Reneberg	6–7, 6–4, 6–1
Loss	27–19	Jul 1991	Washington, D.C., United States	Hard	(United States) Ken Flach	(United States) Scott Davis (United States) David Pate	4–6, 2–6
Win	28–19	Aug 1991	Cincinnati, United States	Hard	(United States) Ken Flach	(Canada) Grant Connell (Canada) Glenn Michibata	6–7, 6–4, 7–5
Win	29–19	Aug 1991	Indianapolis, United States	Hard	(United States) Ken Flach	(United States) Kent Kinnear (United States) Sven Salumaa	7–6, 6–4
Loss	29–20	Nov 1991	Doubles Championships, Johannesburg	Hard (i)	(United States) Ken Flach	(Australia) John Fitzgerald (Sweden) Anders Järryd	4–6, 4–6, 6–2, 4–6

== Doubles performance timeline ==
Key
W	F	SF	QF	#R	RR	Q#	DNQ	A	NH

(W) winner; (F) finalist; (SF) semifinalist; (QF) quarterfinalist; (#R) rounds 4, 3, 2, 1; (RR) round-robin stage; (Q#) qualification round; (DNQ) did not qualify; (A) absent; (NH) not held; (SR) strike rate (events won / competed); (W–L) win–loss record.

Tournament	1983	1984	1985	1986	1987	1988	1989	1990	1991	1992	1993	1994	1995	1996	Career SR	Career win–loss
Grand Slam tournaments
Australian Open	3R	2R	A	NH	SF	A	A	A	A	A	A	A	A	A	0 / 3	8–3
French Open	A	1R	QF	QF	W	QF	A	2R	2R	A	A	A	1R	A	1 / 8	17–7
Wimbledon	A	3R	1R	QF	W	W	SF	QF	3R	1R	A	A	1R	A	2 / 10	26–8
U.S. Open	3R	2R	W	A	F	SF	F	3R	SF	A	A	A	A	A	1 / 8	29–6
Grand Slam SR	0 / 2	0 / 4	1 / 3	0 / 2	2 / 4	1 / 3	0 / 2	0 / 3	0 / 3	0 / 1	0 / 0	0 / 0	0 / 2	0 / 4	4 / 29	N/A
Annual win–loss	4–2	3–4	9–2	6–2	20–2	13–2	9–2	6–2	7–3	0–1	0–0	0–0	0–2	0–0	N/A	80–24
ATP Masters Series
Indian Wells	These Tournaments Were Not Masters Series Events Before 1990							A	2R	2R	A	A	A	A	0 / 2	1–2
Miami	These Tournaments Were Not Masters Series Events Before 1990							A	F	2R	A	1R	A	A	0 / 3	5–3
Monte Carlo	These Tournaments Were Not Masters Series Events Before 1990							A	A	A	A	A	A	A	0 / 0	0–0
Rome	These Tournaments Were Not Masters Series Events Before 1990							A	A	A	A	A	A	A	0 / 0	0–0
Hamburg	These Tournaments Were Not Masters Series Events Before 1990							A	A	A	A	A	A	A	0 / 0	0–0
Canada	These Tournaments Were Not Masters Series Events Before 1990							1R	SF	1R	A	A	A	A	0 / 3	3–3
Cincinnati	These Tournaments Were Not Masters Series Events Before 1990							2R	W	A	A	A	A	A	1 / 2	6–1
Stuttgart (Stockholm)	These Tournaments Were Not Masters Series Events Before 1990							A	2R	A	A	A	A	A	0 / 1	0–1
Paris	These Tournaments Were Not Masters Series Events Before 1990							A	SF	A	A	A	A	A	0 / 1	2–1
Masters Series SR	N/A							0 / 3	1 / 6	0 / 2	0 / 0	0 / 1	0 / 0	0 / 0	1 / 12	N/A
Annual win–loss	N/A							1–2	16–5	0–3	0–0	0–1	0–0	0–0	N/A	17–11
Year-end ranking	71	16	1	16	1	2	8	95	6	905	445	1170	507	1259	N/A	
