= Bud Schultz =

American tennis player

- Country (sports): United States
- Born: August 21, 1959 (age 65); Meriden, Connecticut, U.S.
- Height: 6 ft 4 in (1.93 m)
- Plays: Right-handed
- Prize money: $197,894

Singles
- Career record: 47–54
- Career titles: 0
- Highest ranking: No. 40 (March 24, 1984)

Grand Slam singles results
- Australian Open: 3R (1987)
- French Open: 1R (1986)
- Wimbledon: 2R (1985)
- US Open: 3R (1985)

Doubles
- Career record: 27–39
- Career titles: 0
- Highest ranking: No. 128 (July 28, 1986)

Bud Schultz (born William Schultz August 21, 1959) is a former professional tennis player from the United States.

A 1981 graduate of Bates College, Schultz achieved a career-high singles ranking of world No. 40 in 1986 and a career-high doubles ranking of world No. 128 in 1986.

In 2010, he continues as head coach of New England's Boston Lobsters of World Team Tennis.

== ATP finals ==
=== Singles (1 runner-up) ===
Result	W/L	Date	Tournament	Surface	Opponent	Score
Loss	0–1	Jan 1986	Auckland, New Zealand	Hard	(Australia) Mark Woodforde	4–6, 3–6, 6–3, 4–6

=== Doubles (2 runner-ups) ===
Result	W/L	Date	Tournament	Surface	Partner	Opponents	Score
Loss	0–1	Oct 1985	Brisbane, Australia	Carpet	(United States) Ben Testerman	(United States) Martin Davis (Australia) Brad Drewett	2–6, 2–6
Loss	0–2	Jan 1988	Sydney Outdoor, Australia	Grass	(United States) Joey Rive	(Australia) Darren Cahill (Australia) Mark Kratzmann	6–7, 4–6
