= Bob Green (tennis) =

American tennis player

- Country (sports): United States
- Residence: Boston, Massachusetts, United States
- Born: March 25, 1960 (age 65) Omaha, Nebraska, United States
- Height: 6 ft 4 in (1.93 m)
- Plays: Right-handed
- Prize money: $173,900

Singles
- Career record: 43–55
- Career titles: 0
- Highest ranking: No. 39 (17 December 1984)

Grand Slam singles results
- Australian Open: 2R (1985, 1987)
- Wimbledon: 1R (1985, 1986)
- US Open: 4R (1984)

Doubles
- Career record: 22–34
- Career titles: 1
- Highest ranking: No. 100 (2 February 1987)

Grand Slam doubles results
- Australian Open: 2R (1987)
- Wimbledon: 3R (1987)
- US Open: 1R (1086)

Grand Slam mixed doubles results
- Australian Open: 1R (1988)
- Last updated on: 27 August 2022.

Robert Green (born March 25, 1960) is an American former professional tennis player.

== Career ==
Green spent his collegiate tennis years with Boston University, with a brief stint at the University of Texas. He was a Boston University MVP on three occasions and also served as team captain.

Beginning the 1984 season ranked outside the world's top 300, Green would finish the year ranked 39th and win the ATP Newcomer of the Year Award. His most noted performance came in the 1984 US Open, where he was the only qualifier to reach the round of 16. En route he had a win over 11th seed Juan Aguilera and when he was eliminated it was to the eventual champion, John McEnroe. In 1984 he also made the semi-finals in Tel Aviv and was a quarter-finalist in Livingston, Hong Kong and Johannesburg.

He was never able to replicate the consistent results he had in 1984 but he did make the semi-finals at San Francisco in 1985, beating world number 14 Eliot Teltscher along the way. The following year he reached quarter-finals in Toronto, Milan and Bristol. His only career title also came in 1986, which was in the men's doubles at the Livingston Open, partnering Wally Masur.

== Grand Prix career finals ==
=== Doubles: 1 (1–0) ===
Result	W/L	Date	Tournament	Surface	Partner	Opponents	Score
Win	1–0	Jul 1986	Livingston, United States	Hard	(Australia) Wally Masur	(United States) Sammy Giammalva, Jr. (United States) Greg Holmes	5–7, 6–4, 6–4
