= Sammy Giammalva Jr. =

American tennis player

- Country (sports): United States
- Born: March 24, 1963 (age 62) Houston, Texas, United States
- Height: 1.78 m (5 ft 10 in)
- Turned pro: 1981
- Retired: 1990
- Plays: Right-handed (two-handed backhand)
- College: University of Texas; Rice University
- Prize money: $754,113

Singles
- Career record: 161–164
- Career titles: 2; 0 Challenger, 0 Futures
- Highest ranking: No. 28 (21 October 1985)

Grand Slam singles results
- Australian Open: QF (1982)
- French Open: 2R (1986)
- Wimbledon: 4R (1985)
- US Open: 3R (1980)

Other tournaments
- WCT Finals: QF (1981)

Doubles
- Career record: 155–138
- Career titles: 4; 0 Challenger, 0 Futures
- Highest ranking: No. 22 (29 October 1984)

Grand Slam doubles results
- Australian Open: 2R (1983, 1984)
- French Open: 1R (1986, 1987)
- Wimbledon: QF (1983)
- US Open: 3R (1983, 1988)

Grand Slam mixed doubles results
- French Open: 2R (1980)
- US Open: 2R (1988)

Sammy Giammalva Jr. (born March 24, 1963) is a former professional tennis player from the United States. During his career he won 2 singles titles and 4 doubles titles. He achieved a career-high singles ranking of World No. 28 in 1985 and a career-high doubles ranking of World No. 22 in 1984.

Giammalva's father Sam played top-level amateur tennis and participated on two Davis Cup winning teams for the U.S. His older brother Tony was also a touring pro.

Giammalva left the Grand Prix tour in 1989 and enrolled in Rice University.

== ATP career finals ==
=== Singles: 7 (2 titles, 5 runner-ups) ===
Legend Grand Slam Tournaments (0–0) Grand Prix Masters (0–0) Grand Prix (2–5)	Finals by surface Hard (1–1) Clay (0–2) Grass (0–2) Carpet (1–0)	Finals by setting Outdoors (1–5) Indoors (1–0)

Result	W–L	Date	Tournament	Tier	Surface	Opponent	Score
Win	1–0	Mar 1981	Napa, United States	Grand Prix	Hard	(United States) Scott Davis	6–3, 5–7, 6–1
Loss	1–1	Apr 1981	Houston, United States	Grand Prix	Clay	(Argentina) Guillermo Vilas	2–6, 4–6
Win	2–1	Mar 1983	Monterrey, Mexico	Grand Prix	Carpet	(United States) Ben Testerman	6–4, 3–6, 6–3
Loss	2–2	Oct 1983	Hong Kong, Hong Kong	Grand Prix	Hard	(Australia) Wally Masur	1–6, 1–6
Loss	2–3	Apr 1984	Houston, United States	Grand Prix	Clay	(United States) Mark Dickson	3–6, 2–6
Loss	2–4	Dec 1984	Sydney, Australia	Grand Prix	Grass	(Australia) John Fitzgerald	3–6, 3–6
Loss	2–5	Jul 1987	Newport, United States	Grand Prix	Grass	(United States) Dan Goldie	7–6^{(7–5)}, 4–6, 4–6

=== Doubles: 17 (4 titles, 13 runner-ups) ===
Legend Grand Slam Tournaments (0–0) Grand Prix Masters (0–0) Grand Prix (4–13)	Finals by surface Hard (0–9) Clay (0–2) Grass (1–0) Carpet (3–2)	Finals by setting Outdoors (1–10) Indoors (3–3)

Result	W–L	Date	Tournament	Tier	Surface	Partnet	Opponents	Score
Loss	0–1	Aug 1981	Atlanta, United States	Grand Prix	Hard	(United States) Tony Giammalva	(United States) Fritz Buehning (United States) Peter Fleming	4–6, 6–4, 3–6
Loss	0–2	Oct 1981	Vienna, Austria	Grand Prix	Hard	(United States) Fred McNair	(United States) Steve Denton (United States) Tim Wilkison	6–4, 3–6, 4–6
Win	1–2	Nov 1981	Bologna, Italy	Grand Prix	Carpet	(France) Henri Leconte	(Czechoslovakia) Tomáš Šmíd (Hungary) Balázs Taróczy	7–6, 6–4
Win	2–2	Mar 1982	Zurich, Switzerland	Grand Prix	Carpet	(United States) Tom Gullikson	(Poland) Wojciech Fibak (Australia) John Fitzgerald	6–4, 6–2
Loss	2–3	May 1982	Florence, Italy	Grand Prix	Clay	(United States) Tony Giammalva	(Italy) Paolo Bertolucci (Italy) Adriano Panatta	6–7, 1–6
Loss	2–4	Aug 1982	Zell Am See, Austria	Grand Prix	Clay	(United States) Tony Giammalva	(Poland) Wojciech Fibak (United States) Bruce Manson	7–6, 4–6, 4–6
Loss	2–5	Nov 1983	Hong Kong, Hong Kong	Grand Prix	Hard	(United States) Steve Meister	(United States) Drew Gitlin (Australia) Craig Miller	2–6, 2–6
Loss	2–6	Sep 1984	San Francisco, United States	Grand Prix	Carpet	(United States) Mike De Palmer	(United States) Peter Fleming (United States) John McEnroe	3–6, 4–6
Win	3–6	Oct 1984	Tokyo, Ja[an	Grand Prix	Carpet	(United States) Tony Giammalva	(Australia) Mark Edmondson (United States) Sherwood Stewart	7–6, 6–4
Loss	3–7	Apr 1985	Fort Myers, United States	Grand Prix	Hard	(United States) David Pate	(United States) Ken Flach (United States) Robert Seguso	6–3, 3–6, 3–6
Win	4–7	Jul 1985	Newport, United States	Grand Prix	Grass	(Australia) Peter Doohan	(United States) Paul Annacone (South Africa) Christo van Rensburg	6–1, 6–3
Loss	4–8	Oct 1985	Tokyo, Japan	Grand Prix	Hard	(United States) Greg Holmes	(Australia) Scott Davis (United States) David Pate	6–7, 7–6, 3–6
Loss	4–9	Jul 1986	Livingston, United States	Grand Prix	Hard	(United States) Greg Holmes	(United States) Bob Green (Australia) Wally Masur	7–5, 4–6, 4–6
Loss	4–10	Oct 1987	Tokyo, Japan	Grand Prix	Carpet	(United States) Jim Grabb	(Australia) Broderick Dyke (Netherlands) Tom Nijssen	3–6, 2–6
Loss	4–11	Jan 1988	Auckland, New Zealand	Grand Prix	Hard	(United States) Jim Grabb	(United States) Martin Davis (United States) Tim Pawsat	3–6, 6–3, 4–6
Loss	4–12	Aug 1988	Livingston, United States	Grand Prix	Hard	(United States) Marc Flur	(Canada) Grant Connell (Canada) Glenn Michibata	6–2, 4–6, 5–7
Loss	4–13	Aug 1989	Livingston, United States	Grand Prix	Hard	(New Zealand) Kelly Evernden	(United States) Tim Pawsat (United States) Tim Wilkison	5–7, 3–6

== Performance timeline ==
Key
W	F	SF	QF	#R	RR	Q#	DNQ	A	NH

(W) winner; (F) finalist; (SF) semifinalist; (QF) quarterfinalist; (#R) rounds 4, 3, 2, 1; (RR) round-robin stage; (Q#) qualification round; (DNQ) did not qualify; (A) absent; (NH) not held; (SR) strike rate (events won / competed); (W–L) win–loss record.

=== Singles ===
Tournament	1980	1981	1982	1983	1984	1985	1986	1987	1988	1989	SR	W–L	Win %
Grand Slam tournaments
Australian Open	A	A	QF	2R	1R	2R	A	A	2R	A	0 / 5	5–5	50%
French Open	1R	A	A	A	1R	A	2R	1R	A	A	0 / 4	1–4	20%
Wimbledon	A	1R	A	1R	A	4R	3R	2R	3R	1R	0 / 7	8–7	53%
US Open	3R	2R	A	3R	1R	A	1R	1R	2R	A	0 / 7	5–7	42%
Win–loss	2–2	1–2	3–1	2–3	0–3	3–2	3–3	1–3	4–3	0–1	0 / 23	19–23	45%
ATP Masters Series
Miami	A	A	A	A	A	A	A	1R	1R	2R	0 / 3	1–3	25%
Monte Carlo	A	2R	A	A	A	A	A	A	A	A	0 / 1	1–1	50%
Hamburg	A	2R	A	A	1R	A	A	2R	A	A	0 / 3	2–3	40%
Rome	A	1R	A	A	1R	A	A	A	A	A	0 / 2	0–2	0%
Canada	A	1R	A	2R	A	2R	2R	1R	2R	2R	0 / 7	5–7	42%
Cincinnati	A	A	A	2R	1R	A	A	A	A	A	0 / 2	1–2	33%
Win–loss	0–0	2–4	0–0	2–2	0–3	1–1	1–1	1–3	1–2	2–2	0 / 18	10–18	36%

=== Doubles ===
Tournament	1981	1982	1983	1984	1985	1986	1987	1988	1989	SR	W–L	Win %
Grand Slam tournaments
Australian Open	A	A	2R	2R	1R	A	A	1R	A	0 / 4	0–4	0%
French Open	A	A	A	A	A	1R	1R	A	A	0 / 2	0–2	0%
Wimbledon	A	A	QF	A	2R	2R	A	1R	3R	0 / 5	7–5	58%
US Open	2R	A	3R	1R	A	1R	1R	3R	A	0 / 6	5–6	45%
Win–loss	1–1	0–0	5–3	0–2	1–2	1–3	0–2	2–3	2–1	0 / 17	12–17	41%
ATP Masters Series
Indian Wells	A	A	A	A	A	A	A	A	1R	0 / 1	0–1	0%
Miami	A	A	A	A	A	A	2R	QF	SF	0 / 3	8–3	73%
Hamburg	1R	A	A	A	A	A	A	A	A	0 / 1	0–1	0%
Rome	2R	A	A	SF	A	A	A	A	A	0 / 2	4–2	67%
Canada	2R	A	1R	A	2R	1R	2R	1R	QF	0 / 7	4–7	36%
Cincinnati	A	A	2R	1R	A	A	A	A	A	0 / 2	1–2	33%
Win–loss	2–3	0–0	1–2	3–2	1–1	0–1	2–2	3–2	5–3	0 / 16	17–16	52%
