= Livingston Open =

1984–1989 men's tennis tournament

Defunct tennis tournament
- Event name: Livingston
- Tour: Grand Prix circuit
- Founded: 1984
- Abolished: 1989
- Editions: 6
- Location: Livingston, New Jersey; United States
- Surface: Hard / outdoor

The Livingston Open is a defunct, Grand Prix tennis affiliated men's tennis tournament. It was founded in 1984 as the North American Open and ran to 1989, in Livingston, New Jersey, United States and was played on outdoor hard courts at Newark Academy.

American Brad Gilbert won the singles title on three occasions, while fellow countryman Johan Kriek won it twice and Andre Agassi won it once.

== Results ==
=== Singles ===
Year	Champions	Runners-up	Score
1984	(United States) Johan Kriek	(West Germany) Michael Westphal	6–2, 6–4
1985	(United States) Brad Gilbert	(United States) Brian Teacher	7–6, 6–4
1986	(United States) Brad Gilbert	(United States) Mike Leach	6–2, 6–2
1987	(United States) Johan Kriek	(Germany) Christian Saceanu	7–6, 3–6, 6–2
1988	(United States) Andre Agassi	(United States) Jeff Tarango	6–2, 6–4
1989	(United States) Brad Gilbert	(Australia) Jason Stoltenberg	6–4, 6–4

=== Doubles ===
Year	Champions	Runners-up	Score
1984	(United States) Scott Davis (United States) Ben Testerman	(United States) Paul Annacone (Canada) Glenn Michibata	6–4, 6–4
1985	(United States) Mike De Palmer (Australia) Peter Doohan	(South Africa) Eddie Edwards (South Africa) Danie Visser	6–3, 6–4
1986	(United States) Bob Green (Australia) Wally Masur	(United States) Sammy Giammalva Jr. (United States) Greg Holmes	5–7, 6–4, 6–4
1987	(United States) Gary Donnelly (United States) Greg Holmes	(United States) Ken Flach (United States) Robert Seguso	7–6, 6–3
1988	(Canada) Grant Connell (Canada) Glenn Michibata	(United States) Marc Flur (United States) Sammy Giammalva Jr.	2–6, 6–4, 7–5
1989	(United States) Tim Pawsat (United States) Tim Wilkison	(New Zealand) Kelly Evernden (United States) Sammy Giammalva Jr.	7–5, 6–3

== Event Names ==
Official

- North American Open (1984)
- Livingston Open & New Jersey Championships (1985-1987)
- Livingston Open (1988-1989)

Sponsored

- Volvo Tennis New Jersey Championships (1985-1987)
- Mennen Cup (1988)
- Swiss Army Knife Open (1989)
