= Marcel Freeman =

American tennis player

- Country (sports): United States
- Born: March 30, 1960 (age 65); Port Washington, New York, U.S.
- Height: 5 ft 8 in (1.73 m)
- Plays: Right-handed
- Prize money: $180,275

Singles
- Career record: 54–87
- Career titles: 0
- Highest ranking: No. 46 (November 3, 1986)

Grand Slam singles results
- Australian Open: 3R (1983)
- French Open: 2R (1984, 1986)
- Wimbledon: 2R (1986)
- US Open: 3R (1986)

Doubles
- Career record: 42–65
- Career titles: 1
- Highest ranking: No. 70 (July 13, 1987)

Marcel Freeman (born March 30, 1960) is a former professional tennis player from the United States.

== Career ==
Freeman's career high singles ranking was world No. 46, which he reached in November, 1986. His best Grand Prix result was reaching the semi-finals in 1988 Queensland Open, whilst his best Grand Slam result was reaching the third round of the 1986 US Open. His career win–loss record for Grand Prix and Grand Slam play was 54–87.

During his career he won 1 doubles title, partnering Rodney Harmon. He achieved a career-high doubles ranking of world No. 70 in 1987.

== Career finals ==
=== Doubles (1 title, 2 runner-ups) ===
| Result | W/L | Date | Tournament | Surface | Partner | Opponents | Score |
|---|---|---|---|---|---|---|---|
| Loss | 0–1 | Apr 1984 | Bari, Italy | Clay | (United States) Tim Wilkison | (Czechoslovakia) Stanislav Birner (Czechoslovakia) Libor Pimek | 6–2, 6–7, 4–6 |
| Win | 1–1 | Mar 1985 | Nancy, France | Hard (i) | (United States) Rodney Harmon | (Czechoslovakia) Jaroslav Navrátil (Sweden) Jonas Svensson | 6–4, 7–6 |
| Loss | 1–2 | Apr 1985 | Bari, Italy | Clay | (Australia) Laurie Warder | (Argentina) Alejandro Ganzábal (Italy) Claudio Panatta | 4–6, 2–6 |

== College tennis ==
Freeman was a four-time All-American at UCLA.
