= Mike Leach (tennis) =

American tennis player (born 1960)

- Country (sports): United States
- Born: March 9, 1960 (age 66) Minneapolis, U.S.
- Height: 1.80 m (5 ft 11 in)
- Plays: Left-handed
- College: University of Michigan
- Prize money: $379,136

Singles
- Career record: 74–102
- Career titles: 0
- Highest ranking: No. 29 (July 15, 1985)

Grand Slam singles results
- Australian Open: 3R (1983)
- French Open: 2R (1984)
- Wimbledon: 4R (1983)
- US Open: 1R (1980, 82, 83, 84, 85, 86)

Doubles
- Career record: 105–96
- Career titles: 4
- Highest ranking: No. 15 (December 8, 1986)

Grand Slam doubles results
- Australian Open: 2R (1982, 1983, 1985)
- French Open: 2R (1983, 1984, 1987)
- Wimbledon: 3R (1987)
- US Open: 3R (1983, 1987)

Michael E. Leach (born March 9, 1960) is a former collegiate and ATP Tour professional tennis player who won the NCAA singles championship in 1982 while attending the University of Michigan.

== Early years ==
Leach grew up in Weston, Massachusetts outside Boston. He was the third child in a family of six and began playing tennis after he received a racket for his 11th birthday. He earned the No. 1 singles and doubles rankings in New England's 14-and-under division, and upon moving to the 16-18 division, he was ranked No. 11 nationally.

== University of Michigan ==
Leach accepted a tennis scholarship to attend the University of Michigan, where he won the 1982 NCAA singles title was the first married NCAA winner in history, and was a two-time All-American. He played for Michigan's tennis team from 1979 to 1982. As a sophomore, he was Michigan's top player with a 24-4 singles record, leading to the Big Ten singles and doubles titles. As a junior, Leach won all but two individual matches and made the final 16 in the NCAA Tournament. His performance earned him All-America honors in 1981. In 1982, as an unseeded player, he was a long shot to win the NCAA singles title against future 12-year professional Brad Gilbert of Pepperdine. Leach pressured the usually consistent Gilbert into errors and thrilled the collegiate tennis world by winning the 1982 NCAA singles title in straight sets (7–5, 6–3). He became only the second Wolverine to win the national title, joining Barry MacKay (tennis) who won the singles title in 1957. He was also a two-time Big Ten Conference doubles champion with Matt Horwitch in 1980 and with Mark Mees in 1982. In four years at Michigan, Leach had a record of 99–19 in singles competition and 80–15 in doubles competition.

== ATP Tour ==
Leach played on the ATP Tour from 1982 to 1987 and had a career-high ranking of world No. 29 in singles and world No. 15 in doubles. He reached the final 16 at Wimbledon in 1983, and his career highlights include victories over Stefan Edberg, Pat Cash and Mats Wilander. During his five-year pro career, Leach also won four doubles titles.

Leach lived both in Ann Arbor and Ponte Vedra Beach

== Doubles play with his father ==
For many years, Leach played doubles with his father, Dr. Robert E. Leach, orthopedic surgeon for the Boston Celtics. They were the top-ranked father-son doubles pair in New England from 1977 to 1983 and earned eight national rankings from 1979 to 1992. In 1990, they were the nation's No. 1 tandem and won the USTA's gold ball at the National Grass Court Championships. Leach and his father began playing together when Michael was 11, and his father was his practice partner. From 1979 to 1981, the two earned a national ranking of 3, 1 and 4 (consecutively) as a father/son doubles duo. After a hiatus from playing together, Leach and his father later returned to the tournament circuit and won the National Father/Son Grass Court Tournament in both 1990 and 1991. Leach and his father have each been separately inducted into the USTA New England Hall of Fame, with Michael being inducted in 2001 and his father in 2006.

== Later years ==
After retiring from the ATP Tour, Leach worked from 1987 to 1992 at the Atlanta Health & Racquet Club in Atlanta. Since 1992, he has been the Director of Tennis at the Ponte Vedra Inn and Club in Ponte Vedra Beach, Florida. Leach has created a summer tennis event known as "Leach at the Beach." The event provides experienced and beginning players an opportunity to improve their skills through clinics, drills, match play and video analysis. Leach's hobbies are weight-training, inline-skating, reading, and dining out. He is 5 feet 11 inches (1.80 m) tall, weighs 165 pounds (75 kg), and plays left-handed.

== Awards and honors ==
In 2001, Leach was inducted into the USTA New England chapter's Hall of Fame in Westborough, Massachusetts. At the time, Leach said: "I'm too darn young to be in any hall of fame, but obviously I'm thrilled and I know it's going to be something that with time I'm going to very much appreciate. I know my parents will [appreciate it], and I'm probably doing it more for them than anybody. They spent a lot of time driving me around various New England states, when I was a kid." In February 2008, Leach was inducted into the University of Michigan Athletic Hall of Honor along with Heisman Trophy winner Desmond Howard.

Leach is also a past president of the Northern Florida Professional Tennis Association and tournament chairman of the Gate Petroleum Pro Tennis Open.

== Grand Prix career finals ==
=== Singles (1 runner-up) ===
Result	W/L	Date	Tournament	Surface	Opponent	Score
Loss	0–1	Jul 1986	Livingston, United States	Hard	(United States) Brad Gilbert	2–6, 2–6

=== Doubles (4 titles, 7 runner-ups) ===
Result	W/L	Date	Tournament	Surface	Partner	Opponents	Score
Loss	0–1	May 1983	Rome, Italy	Clay	(Sweden) Jan Gunnarsson	(Paraguay) Francisco González (Paraguay) Víctor Pecci	2–6, 7–6, 4–6
Loss	0–2	May 1984	Rome, Italy	Clay	(Australia) John Alexander	(United States) Ken Flach (United States) Robert Seguso	6–3, 3–6, 4–6
Loss	0–3	Sep 1984	Honolulu, United States	Carpet	(United States) Mark Dickson	(United States) Gary Donnelly (United States) Butch Walts	6–7, 4–6
Win	1–3	Aug 1986	Toronto, Canada	Hard	(United States) Chip Hooper	(West Germany) Boris Becker (Socialist Federal Republic of Yugoslavia) Slobodan Živojinović	7–6, 4–6, 7–5
Win	2–3	Oct 1986	Scottsdale, United States	Hard	(Mexico) Leonardo Lavalle	(United States) Scott Davis (United States) David Pate	7–6, 6–4
Loss	2–4	Nov 1986	Houston, US	Carpet (i)	(United States) Chip Hooper	(Chile) Ricardo Acuña (United States) Brad Pearce	4–6, 5–7
Win	3–4	Nov 1986	Itaparica, Brazil	Hard	(United States) Chip Hooper	(France) Loïc Courteau (France) Guy Forget	7–6, 4–6, 7–5
Loss	3–5	Mar 1987	Rotterdam, Netherlands	Carpet (i)	(United States) Chip Hooper	(Sweden) Stefan Edberg (Sweden) Anders Järryd	6–3, 3–6, 4–6
Loss	3–6	Mar 1987	Brussels, Belgium	Carpet (i)	(United States) Chip Hooper	(West Germany) Boris Becker (Socialist Federal Republic of Yugoslavia) Slobodan Živojinović	6–7, 6–7
Win	4–6	Apr 1987	Seoul, South Korea	Hard	(United States) Eric Korita	(United States) Ken Flach (United States) Jim Grabb	6–7, 6–1, 7–5
Loss	4–7	Jul 1987	Newport, United States	Grass	(United States) Chip Hooper	(United States) Dan Goldie (United States) Larry Scott	3–6, 6–4, 4–6
