= Chip Hooper =

American tennis player

- Country (sports): United States
- Residence: Sunnyvale, California
- Born: October 24, 1958 (age 67) Washington, D.C.
- Height: 6 ft 6 in (1.98 m)
- Plays: Right-handed (one-handed backhand)
- Prize money: $479,798

Singles
- Career record: 104–119
- Career titles: 0
- Highest ranking: No. 17 (19 April 1982)

Grand Slam singles results
- Australian Open: 2R (1983)
- French Open: 4R (1982)
- Wimbledon: 3R (1985)
- US Open: 3R (1982)

Doubles
- Career record: 112–112
- Career titles: 5
- Highest ranking: No. 18 (8 December 1986)

Grand Slam doubles results
- Australian Open: 2R (1988)
- French Open: 2R (1982, 1987)
- Wimbledon: 3R (1986, 1987)
- US Open: QF (1982)

Chip Hooper (born October 24, 1958) is a former tennis player from the United States, who won five doubles titles during his professional career.

The right-handed Hooper reached his highest ATP singles ranking of World No. 17 in April 1982

Hooper played collegiately at Memphis State University (now University of Memphis) and the University of Arkansas.

Currently, he is working as a private tennis coach in Miami.

== Grand Prix career finals ==
=== Singles (2 runner-ups) ===
Result	W/L	Date	Tournament	Surface	Opponent	Score
Loss	0–1	Mar 1983	Lorraine, France	Hard	(United States) Nick Saviano	4–6, 6–4, 3–6
Loss	0–2	Jan 1984	Auckland, New Zealand	Hard	(United States) Danny Saltz	6–4, 3–6, 4–6, 4–6

=== Doubles (5 titles, 5 runner-ups) ===
Result	W/L	Date	Tournament	Surface	Partner	Opponents	Score
Win	1–0	May 1982	Munich, West Germany	Clay	(United States) Mel Purcell	(South Africa) Tian Viljoen (South Africa) Danie Visser	6–4, 7–6
Loss	1–1	Jan 1984	Auckland, New Zealand	Hard	(Australia) Brad Drewett	(South Africa) Brian Levine (United States) John Van Nostrand	5–7, 2–6
Win	2–1	May 1984	Firenze, Italy	Clay	(United States) Mark Dickson	(South Africa) Bernard Mitton (United States) Butch Walts	7–6, 4–6, 7–5
Win	3–1	Apr 1986	Cologne, West Germany	Hard	(New Zealand) Kelly Evernden	(Sweden) Jan Gunnarsson (Sweden) Peter Lundgren	6–4, 6–7, 6–3
Win	4–1	Aug 1986	Toronto, Canada	Hard	(United States) Mike Leach	(West Germany) Boris Becker (Socialist Federal Republic of Yugoslavia) Slobodan Živojinović	7–6, 4–6, 7–5
Loss	4–2	Nov 1986	Houston, US	Carpet (i)	(United States) Mike Leach	(Chile) Ricardo Acuña (United States) Brad Pearce	4–6, 5–7
Win	5–2	Nov 1986	Itaparica, Brazil	Hard	(United States) Mike Leach	(France) Loïc Courteau (France) Guy Forget	7–6, 4–6, 7–5
Loss	5–3	Mar 1987	Rotterdam, Netherlands	Carpet (i)	(United States) Mike Leach	(Sweden) Stefan Edberg (Sweden) Anders Järryd	6–3, 3–6, 4–6
Loss	5–4	Mar 1987	Brussels, Belgium	Carpet (i)	(United States) Mike Leach	(West Germany) Boris Becker (Socialist Federal Republic of Yugoslavia) Slobodan Živojinović	6–7, 6–7
Loss	5–5	Jul 1987	Newport, US	Grass	(United States) Mike Leach	(United States) Dan Goldie (United States) Larry Scott	3–6, 6–4, 4–6
