= Greg Holmes (tennis) =

American tennis player

- Country (sports): United States
- Residence: Salt Lake City, Utah, U.S.
- Born: August 29, 1963 (age 63) Covina, California, U.S.
- Height: 5 ft 10 in (1.78 m)
- Turned pro: 1983
- Retired: 1990
- Plays: Right-handed (two-handed backhand)
- Prize money: $368,690

Singles
- Career record: 83–93
- Career titles: 0
- Highest ranking: No. 22 (February 25, 1985)

Grand Slam singles results
- Australian Open: 2R (1985)
- French Open: 2R (1985)
- Wimbledon: 3R (1985, 1986, 1989)
- US Open: 4R (1983, 1984, 1985)

Doubles
- Career record: 44–67
- Career titles: 1
- Highest ranking: No. 66 (February 16, 1987)

Greg Holmes (born August 29, 1963) is a former professional tennis player from the United States. He won one doubles title on the ATP Tour and reached his career-high singles ranking of World No. 22 in February 1985.

Holmes won the 1983 NCAA Men's Tennis Championship, playing for the University of Utah.

In 1989, Holmes defeated Todd Witsken 5–7, 6–4, 7–6^{(5)}, 4–6, 14–12 in the second round at Wimbledon, a match that was the longest men's singles match at Wimbledon timed at 5 hours 28 minutes until the epic Isner–Mahut match in 2010. During his seven-year career he twice beat Jimmy Connors and had wins over Andre Agassi, Aaron Krickstein, and Tim Mayotte.

== Grand Prix career finals ==
=== Doubles: 1 (1–0) ===
Result	W-L	Date	Tournament	Surface	Partner	Opponents	Score
Win	1–0	Jul 1987	Livingston, U.S.	Hard	(United States) Gary Donnelly	(United States) Ken Flach (United States) Robert Seguso	7–6, 6–3
