= 1985 Grand Prix (tennis) =

Tennis circuit

1985 Grand Prix circuit
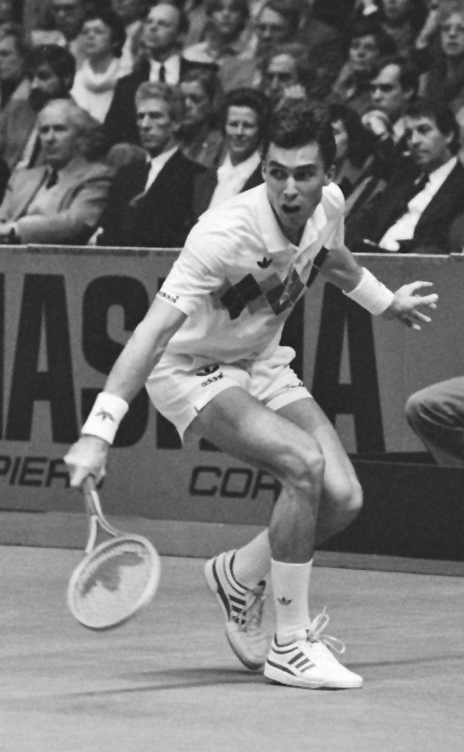
- Ivan Lendl finished the year as world No. 1 for the first time in his career. He won eleven titles during the season, including a major at the US Open, as well as the Masters Grand Prix and the WCT Finals. He also finished runner-up at another major, the French Open.

Details
- Duration: 1 January 1985 – 23 December 1985
- Edition: 16th
- Tournaments: 71
- Categories: Grand Slam (4); World Championship Tennis (3); Regular Series (62); Team Events (2)

Achievements (singles)
- Most titles: (Czechoslovakia) Ivan Lendl (11)
- Most finals: (Czechoslovakia) Ivan Lendl (14)
- Points leader: (Czechoslovakia) Ivan Lendl (4459)

Awards
- Player of the year: (Czechoslovakia) Ivan Lendl
- Most improved player of the year: (West Germany) Boris Becker
- Newcomer of the year: (Peru) Jaime Yzaga
- Comeback player of the year: Not given

The 1985 Nabisco Grand Prix was a professional men's tennis circuit held that year. It consisted of 71 tournaments held in 19 different countries. The tour incorporated the four ITF grand slam tournaments, three World Championship Tennis tournaments and the Grand Prix tournaments. Total prize money for the circuit was $23 million. The circuit was administered by the Men's International Professional Tennis Council (MIPTC). In November 1985 the MIPTC sued player–management agencies ProServ and IMG alleging that these firms were holding the tennis game hostage and were 'exerting extensive power over players'.

The 1985 circuit marked the last time the Australian Open was held in November before moving to its current slot in January. In January 1986 at an awards ceremony in New York the ATP players elected Ivan Lendl as the 1985 ATP Player of the Year. Lendl won the most tournament titles, played the most finals, was the points leader of the Grand Prix circuit and finished the year as no.1 in the ATP ranking. The Grand Slam tournaments were won by four different players (Wilander, Edberg, Becker, Lendl) and for the first time since 1934 all winners were European.

== Schedule ==
The table below shows the 1985 Nabisco Grand Prix schedule (a precursor to the ATP Tour).

Key

Grand Slam events
Team events
World Championship Tennis Event
Year-end championships

=== January ===
Week	Tournament	Champions	Runners-up	Semifinalists	Quarterfinalists
7 Jan	Benson and Hedges Open; Auckland, New Zealand; Hard – $80,000 – 32S/16D; Singles	(New Zealand) Chris Lewis; 7–5, 6–0, 2–6, 6–4	(Australia) Wally Masur	(Australia) John Fitzgerald (United States) Danny Saltz	(Australia) Brad Drewett (New Zealand) Kelly Evernden (Australia) Peter Doohan (United States) Glenn Layendecker
7 Jan	Benson and Hedges Open; Auckland, New Zealand; Hard – $80,000 – 32S/16D; Singles	(Australia) John Fitzgerald (New Zealand) Chris Lewis; 7–6, 6–2	(Australia) Broderick Dyke (Australia) Wally Masur	(Australia) John Fitzgerald (United States) Danny Saltz	(Australia) Brad Drewett (New Zealand) Kelly Evernden (Australia) Peter Doohan (United States) Glenn Layendecker
21 Jan	Ebel U.S. Pro Indoor; Philadelphia, United States; Hard – $300,000 – 48S/24D; Singles – Doubles	(United States) John McEnroe; 6–3, 7–6, 6–1	(Czechoslovakia) Miloslav Mečíř	(United States) Scott Davis (United States) Jimmy Connors	(France) Yannick Noah (United States) Eliot Teltscher (Brazil) João Soares (United States) Mel Purcell
21 Jan	Ebel U.S. Pro Indoor; Philadelphia, United States; Hard – $300,000 – 48S/24D; Singles – Doubles	(Sweden) Joakim Nyström (Sweden) Mats Wilander; 7–6, 7–6	(Poland) Wojciech Fibak (United States) Sandy Mayer	(United States) Scott Davis (United States) Jimmy Connors	(France) Yannick Noah (United States) Eliot Teltscher (Brazil) João Soares (United States) Mel Purcell
28 Jan	U.S. Indoor Championships; Memphis, United States; Carpet – $250,000 – 48S/24D; Singles – Doubles	(Sweden) Stefan Edberg; 6–1, 6–0	(France) Yannick Noah	(United States) Jimmy Connors (United States) Eliot Teltscher	(United States) Brad Gilbert (Israel) Shahar Perkiss (South Africa) Kevin Curren (United States) Greg Holmes
28 Jan	U.S. Indoor Championships; Memphis, United States; Carpet – $250,000 – 48S/24D; Singles – Doubles	(Czechoslovakia) Pavel Složil (Czechoslovakia) Tomáš Šmíd; 1–6, 6–3, 6–4	(South Africa) Kevin Curren (United States) Steve Denton	(United States) Jimmy Connors (United States) Eliot Teltscher	(United States) Brad Gilbert (Israel) Shahar Perkiss (South Africa) Kevin Curren (United States) Greg Holmes

=== February ===
Week	Tournament	Champions	Runners-up	Semifinalists	Quarterfinalists
4 Feb; 11 Feb	Lipton International Players Championships; Delray Beach, United States; Hard – $750,000 – 128S/64D; Singles – Doubles	(United States) Tim Mayotte; 4–6, 4–6, 6–3, 6–2, 6–4	(United States) Scott Davis	(Czechoslovakia) Tomáš Šmíd (Sweden) Jan Gunnarsson	(Sweden) Stefan Edberg (France) Yannick Noah (United States) Vitas Gerulaitis (United States) Mike Leach
4 Feb; 11 Feb	Lipton International Players Championships; Delray Beach, United States; Hard – $750,000 – 128S/64D; Singles – Doubles	(United States) Paul Annacone (South Africa) Christo van Rensburg; 7–5, 7–5, 6–4	(United States) Sherwood Stewart (Australia) Kim Warwick	(Czechoslovakia) Tomáš Šmíd (Sweden) Jan Gunnarsson	(Sweden) Stefan Edberg (France) Yannick Noah (United States) Vitas Gerulaitis (United States) Mike Leach
18 Feb	Pilot Pen Classic; La Quinta, United States; Hard – $375,000 – 56S/28D; Singles – Doubles	(United States) Larry Stefanki; 6–1, 6–4, 3–6, 6–3	(United States) David Pate	(United States) Greg Holmes (Czechoslovakia) Libor Pimek	(United States) Jimmy Connors (France) Tarik Benhabiles (United States) Aaron Krickstein (United Kingdom) John Lloyd
18 Feb	Pilot Pen Classic; La Quinta, United States; Hard – $375,000 – 56S/28D; Singles – Doubles	(Switzerland) Heinz Günthardt (Hungary) Balázs Taróczy; 7–6, 7–5	(United States) Ken Flach (United States) Robert Seguso	(United States) Greg Holmes (Czechoslovakia) Libor Pimek	(United States) Jimmy Connors (France) Tarik Benhabiles (United States) Aaron Krickstein (United Kingdom) John Lloyd
18 Feb	Molson Light Challenge; Toronto, Ontario, Canada; Carpet – $125,000 – 32S/16D; Singles – Doubles	(South Africa) Kevin Curren; 7–6^{(8–6)}, 6–3	(Sweden) Anders Järryd	(Poland) Wojciech Fibak (United States) Eliot Teltscher	(United States) Peter Fleming (United States) Gene Mayer (United States) Bud Schultz (India) Ramesh Krishnan
18 Feb	Molson Light Challenge; Toronto, Ontario, Canada; Carpet – $125,000 – 32S/16D; Singles – Doubles	(United States) Peter Fleming (Sweden) Anders Järryd; 7–6^{(8–6)}, 6–2	(United States) Glenn Layendecker (Canada) Glenn Michibata	(Poland) Wojciech Fibak (United States) Eliot Teltscher	(United States) Peter Fleming (United States) Gene Mayer (United States) Bud Schultz (India) Ramesh Krishnan
25 Febr	WCT Houston Shootout; Houston, United States; Carpet – $375,000 – 32S/16D; Singles – Doubles	(United States) John McEnroe; 7–5, 6–1, 7–6^{(7–4)}	(South Africa) Kevin Curren	(United States) Peter Fleming (Israel) Shahar Perkiss	(United States) Brad Gilbert (United States) Leif Shiras (United States) Mark Dickson (United States) Tim Mayotte
25 Febr	WCT Houston Shootout; Houston, United States; Carpet – $375,000 – 32S/16D; Singles – Doubles	(United States) Peter Fleming (United States) John McEnroe; 6–3, 6–2	(United States) Hank Pfister (United States) Ben Testerman	(United States) Peter Fleming (Israel) Shahar Perkiss	(United States) Brad Gilbert (United States) Leif Shiras (United States) Mark Dickson (United States) Tim Mayotte
25 Febr	Nabisco Grand Prix; Buenos Aires, Argentina; Clay – $80,000 – 32S/16D; Singles – Doubles	(Argentina) Martín Jaite; 6–4, 6–2	(Uruguay) Diego Pérez	(United States) Jimmy Brown (Argentina) Horacio de la Peña	(Argentina) Roberto Argüello (Ecuador) Raúl Viver (Mexico) Francisco Maciel (Argentina) Marcelo Ingaramo
25 Febr	Nabisco Grand Prix; Buenos Aires, Argentina; Clay – $80,000 – 32S/16D; Singles – Doubles	(Argentina) Martín Jaite (Argentina) Christian Miniussi; 6–4, 6–3	(Argentina) Eduardo Bengoechea (Uruguay) Diego Pérez	(United States) Jimmy Brown (Argentina) Horacio de la Peña	(Argentina) Roberto Argüello (Ecuador) Raúl Viver (Mexico) Francisco Maciel (Argentina) Marcelo Ingaramo

=== March ===
Week	Tournament	Champions	Runners-up	Semifinalists	Quarterfinalists
4 Mar	1985 Davis Cup; Kyoto, Japan – carpet Sindelfingen, West Germany – carpet Tbilisi, Soviet Union – carpet Buenos Aires, Argentina – clay Asunción, Paraguay – carpet Split, Yugoslavia – clay (i); Calcutta, India – grass Santiago, Chile – clay	First Round Winners; United States 5–0; West Germany 3–2; Czechoslovakia 3–2; Ecuador 4–1; Paraguay 3–2; Australia 3–2; India 3–2; Sweden 4–1	First Round Losers; Japan; Spain; Soviet Union; Argentina; France; Yugoslavia; Italy; Chile		
11 Mar	Belgium Indoor Championships; Brussels, Belgium; Carpet – $267,000 – 32S/16D; Singles – Doubles	(Sweden) Anders Järryd; 6–4, 3–6, 7–5	(Sweden) Mats Wilander	(Australia) Pat Cash (Sweden) Stefan Edberg	(Switzerland) Heinz Günthardt (Sweden) Joakim Nyström (United States) Sammy Giammalva (Czechoslovakia) Tomáš Šmíd
11 Mar	Belgium Indoor Championships; Brussels, Belgium; Carpet – $267,000 – 32S/16D; Singles – Doubles	(Sweden) Anders Järryd (Sweden) Stefan Edberg; 6–3, 7–6	(South Africa) Kevin Curren (Poland) Wojciech Fibak	(Australia) Pat Cash (Sweden) Stefan Edberg	(Switzerland) Heinz Günthardt (Sweden) Joakim Nyström (United States) Sammy Giammalva (Czechoslovakia) Tomáš Šmíd
18 Mar	ABN World Tennis Tournament; Rotterdam, Netherlands; Carpet – $250,000 – 32S/16D; Singles – Doubles	(Czechoslovakia) Miloslav Mečíř; 6–1, 6–2	(Switzerland) Jakob Hlasek	(Czechoslovakia) Tomáš Šmíd (Sweden) Joakim Nyström	(United States) John Sadri (Paraguay) Francisco González (Australia) Pat Cash (West Germany) Boris Becker
18 Mar	ABN World Tennis Tournament; Rotterdam, Netherlands; Carpet – $250,000 – 32S/16D; Singles – Doubles	(Czechoslovakia) Pavel Složil (Czechoslovakia) Tomáš Šmíd; 6–4, 6–4	(United States) Vitas Gerulaitis (Australia) Paul McNamee	(Czechoslovakia) Tomáš Šmíd (Sweden) Joakim Nyström	(United States) John Sadri (Paraguay) Francisco González (Australia) Pat Cash (West Germany) Boris Becker
18 Mar	Lorraine Open; Nancy, France; Hard(i) – $80,000 – 32S/16D; Singles – Doubles	(United States) Tim Wilkison; 4–6, 7–6^{(7–5)}, 9–7	(Socialist Federal Republic of Yugoslavia) Slobodan Živojinović	(France) Pascal Portes (United States) Chip Hooper	(Australia) John Frawley (France) Henri Leconte (West Germany) Rolf Gehring (Austria) Bernhard Pils
18 Mar	Lorraine Open; Nancy, France; Hard(i) – $80,000 – 32S/16D; Singles – Doubles	(United States) Marcel Freeman (United States) Rodney Harmon; 6–4, 7–6	(Czechoslovakia) Jaroslav Navrátil (Sweden) Jonas Svensson	(France) Pascal Portes (United States) Chip Hooper	(Australia) John Frawley (France) Henri Leconte (West Germany) Rolf Gehring (Austria) Bernhard Pils
25 Mar	Fila Trophy; Milan, Italy; Carpet – $300,000 – 32S/16D; Singles – Doubles	(United States) John McEnroe; 6–4, 6–1	(Sweden) Anders Järryd	(Switzerland) Jakob Hlasek (Czechoslovakia) Tomáš Šmíd	(France) Henri Leconte (United States) Tim Wilkison (United States) Vitas Gerulaitis (United States) John Sadri
25 Mar	Fila Trophy; Milan, Italy; Carpet – $300,000 – 32S/16D; Singles – Doubles	(Switzerland) Heinz Günthardt (Sweden) Anders Järryd; 6–2, 6–1	(Australia) Broderick Dyke (Australia) Wally Masur	(Switzerland) Jakob Hlasek (Czechoslovakia) Tomáš Šmíd	(France) Henri Leconte (United States) Tim Wilkison (United States) Vitas Gerulaitis (United States) John Sadri
25 Mar	Paine Webber Classic; Fort Myers, United States; Hard – $250,000 – 32S/16D; Singles – Doubles	(Czechoslovakia) Ivan Lendl; 6–3, 6–2	(United States) Jimmy Connors	(Ecuador) Andrés Gómez (United States) Sammy Giammalva, Jr.	(United States) Johan Kriek (United States) Eliot Teltscher (United States) Scott Davis (United States) Brad Gilbert
25 Mar	Paine Webber Classic; Fort Myers, United States; Hard – $250,000 – 32S/16D; Singles – Doubles	(United States) Ken Flach (United States) Robert Seguso; 3–6, 6–3, 6–3	(United States) Sammy Giammalva (United States) David Pate	(Ecuador) Andrés Gómez (United States) Sammy Giammalva, Jr.	(United States) Johan Kriek (United States) Eliot Teltscher (United States) Scott Davis (United States) Brad Gilbert

=== April ===
Week	Tournament	Champions	Runners-up	Semifinalists	Quarterfinalists
1 Apr	Jacomo Monte Carlo Open; Roquebrune-Cap-Martin, France; Clay – $325,000 – 48S/24D	(Czechoslovakia) Ivan Lendl; 6–1, 6–3, 4–6, 6–4	(Sweden) Mats Wilander	(Sweden) Henrik Sundström (United States) Aaron Krickstein	(Italy) Francesco Cancellotti (West Germany) Michael Westphal (Czechoslovakia) Tomáš Šmíd (Czechoslovakia) Libor Pimek
1 Apr	Jacomo Monte Carlo Open; Roquebrune-Cap-Martin, France; Clay – $325,000 – 48S/24D	(Czechoslovakia) Pavel Složil (Czechoslovakia) Tomáš Šmíd; 6–2, 6–3	(Israel) Shlomo Glickstein (Israel) Shahar Perkiss	(Sweden) Henrik Sundström (United States) Aaron Krickstein	(Italy) Francesco Cancellotti (West Germany) Michael Westphal (Czechoslovakia) Tomáš Šmíd (Czechoslovakia) Libor Pimek
1 Apr	Volvo Tennis Chicago; Chicago, United States; Carpet – $325,000 – 32S/16D	(United States) John McEnroe; Walkover	(United States) Jimmy Connors	(United States) Scott Davis (Ecuador) Andrés Gómez	(United States) Paul Annacone (United States) Terry Moor (United States) Tim Mayotte (United States) Brad Gilbert
1 Apr	Volvo Tennis Chicago; Chicago, United States; Carpet – $325,000 – 32S/16D	(United States) Johan Kriek (France) Yannick Noah; 3–6, 4–6, 7–5, 6–1, 6–4	(United States) Ken Flach (United States)	(United States) Scott Davis (Ecuador) Andrés Gómez	(United States) Paul Annacone (United States) Terry Moor (United States) Tim Mayotte (United States) Brad Gilbert
8 Apr	Buick WCT Finals; Dallas, United States; Carpet – $500,000 – 12S; Singles	(Czechoslovakia) Ivan Lendl; 7–6^{(7–4)}, 6–4, 6–1	(United States) Tim Mayotte	(United States) Jimmy Connors (Sweden) Joakim Nyström	(United States) John McEnroe (Sweden) Mats Wilander (Sweden) Stefan Edberg (United States) Aaron Krickstein
8 Apr	Nice International Open; Nice, France; Clay – $80,000 – 32S/16D	(France) Henri Leconte; 6–4, 6–4	(Paraguay) Víctor Pecci	(West Germany) Hans Schwaier (Uruguay) Diego Pérez	(Socialist Federal Republic of Yugoslavia) Slobodan Živojinović (Spain) Fernando Luna (Argentina) Roberto Argüello (France) Tarik Benhabiles
8 Apr	Nice International Open; Nice, France; Clay – $80,000 – 32S/16D	(Italy) Claudio Panatta (Czechoslovakia) Pavel Složil; 3–6, 6–3, 8–6	(France) Loïc Courteau (France) Guy Forget	(West Germany) Hans Schwaier (Uruguay) Diego Pérez	(Socialist Federal Republic of Yugoslavia) Slobodan Živojinović (Spain) Fernando Luna (Argentina) Roberto Argüello (France) Tarik Benhabiles
15 Apr	Kim Top Line Trophy; Bari, Italy; Clay – $80,000 – 32S/16D	(Italy) Claudio Panatta; 6–2, 1–6, 7–6	(United States) Lawson Duncan	(Spain) José López-Maeso (West Germany) Hans Schwaier	(Italy) Claudio Pistolesi (Argentina) Roberto Argüello (Argentina) Horacio de la Peña (Argentina) Martín Jaite
15 Apr	Kim Top Line Trophy; Bari, Italy; Clay – $80,000 – 32S/16D	(Argentina) Alejandro Ganzábal (Italy) Claudio Panatta; 6–4, 6–2	(United States) Marcel Freeman (Australia) Laurie Warder	(Spain) José López-Maeso (West Germany) Hans Schwaier	(Italy) Claudio Pistolesi (Argentina) Roberto Argüello (Argentina) Horacio de la Peña (Argentina) Martín Jaite
22 Apr	WCT Atlanta Championships; Atlanta, United States; Carpet – $375,000 – 32S/16D	(United States) John McEnroe; 7–6, 7–6, 6–2	(United States) Paul Annacone	(United States) Mike Leach (United States) Kevin Curren	(United States) Tim Mayotte (Australia) Pat Cash (United States) Brad Gilbert (United States) Scott Davis
22 Apr	WCT Atlanta Championships; Atlanta, United States; Carpet – $375,000 – 32S/16D	(United States) Paul Annacone (South Africa) Christo van Rensburg; 6–4, 6–3	(United States) Steve Denton (Czechoslovakia) Tomáš Šmíd	(United States) Mike Leach (United States) Kevin Curren	(United States) Tim Mayotte (Australia) Pat Cash (United States) Brad Gilbert (United States) Scott Davis
22 Apr	Puente Romano Open; Marbella, Spain; Clay – $100,000 – 32S/16D	(Argentina) Horacio de la Peña; 6–0, 6–3	(United States) Lawson Duncan	(Argentina) Eduardo Bengoechea (United Kingdom) Steve Shaw	(Peru) Pablo Arraya (Haiti) Ronald Agénor (Spain) José López-Maeso (Argentina) Alejandro Ganzábal
22 Apr	Puente Romano Open; Marbella, Spain; Clay – $100,000 – 32S/16D	(Ecuador) Andrés Gómez (Brazil) Cássio Motta; 6–1, 6–1	(France) Loïc Courteau (Netherlands) Michiel Schapers	(Argentina) Eduardo Bengoechea (United Kingdom) Steve Shaw	(Peru) Pablo Arraya (Haiti) Ronald Agénor (Spain) José López-Maeso (Argentina) Alejandro Ganzábal
29 Apr	Alan King Classic; Las Vegas, United States; Hard – $312,000 – 32S/16D; Singles – Doubles	(United States) Johan Kriek; 4–6, 6–4, 6–3, 6–2	(United States) Jimmy Arias	(United States) Ken Flach (Czechoslovakia) Tomáš Šmíd	(United Kingdom) John Lloyd (United States) Eliot Teltscher (United States) Tim Mayotte (West Germany) Boris Becker
29 Apr	Alan King Classic; Las Vegas, United States; Hard – $312,000 – 32S/16D; Singles – Doubles	(Australia) Pat Cash (Australia) John Fitzgerald; 7–6, 6–7, 7–6	(United States) Paul Annacone (South Africa) Christo van Rensburg	(United States) Ken Flach (Czechoslovakia) Tomáš Šmíd	(United Kingdom) John Lloyd (United States) Eliot Teltscher (United States) Tim Mayotte (West Germany) Boris Becker
29 Apr	Ebel German Open; Hamburg, West Germany; Clay – $315,000 – 56S/28D	(Czechoslovakia) Miloslav Mečíř; 6–4, 6–1, 6–4	(Sweden) Henrik Sundström	(Sweden) Mats Wilander (Argentina) José Luis Clerc	(Argentina) Guillermo Vilas (Sweden) Joakim Nyström (Sweden) Jan Gunnarsson (Ecuador) Andrés Gómez
29 Apr	Ebel German Open; Hamburg, West Germany; Clay – $315,000 – 56S/28D	(Chile) Hans Gildemeister (Ecuador) Andrés Gómez; 6–4, 6–3	(Switzerland) Heinz Günthardt (Hungary) Balázs Taróczy	(Sweden) Mats Wilander (Argentina) José Luis Clerc	(Argentina) Guillermo Vilas (Sweden) Joakim Nyström (Sweden) Jan Gunnarsson (Ecuador) Andrés Gómez

=== May ===
Week	Tournament	Champions	Runners-up	Semifinalists	Quarterfinalists
6 May	WCT Tournament of Champions; Forest Hills, New York, United States; Clay – $615,000 – 64S/32D	(Czechoslovakia) Ivan Lendl; 6–3, 6–3	(United States) John McEnroe	(Sweden) Henrik Sundström (United States) Aaron Krickstein	(Italy) Claudio Panatta (United States) Terry Moor (United States) Brad Gilbert (United States) Lawson Duncan
6 May	WCT Tournament of Champions; Forest Hills, New York, United States; Clay – $615,000 – 64S/32D	(United States) Ken Flach (United States) Robert Seguso; 7–5, 6–2	(Brazil) Givaldo Barbosa (Brazil) Ivan Kley	(Sweden) Henrik Sundström (United States) Aaron Krickstein	(Italy) Claudio Panatta (United States) Terry Moor (United States) Brad Gilbert (United States) Lawson Duncan
13 May	Italian Open; Rome, Italy; Clay – $350,000 – 64S/32D; Singles – Doubles	(France) Yannick Noah; 6–4, 3–6, 6–2, 7–6^{(7–4)}	(Czechoslovakia) Miloslav Mečíř	(Sweden) Mats Wilander (West Germany) Boris Becker	(Sweden) Henrik Sundström (Switzerland) Claudio Mezzadri (Argentina) José Luis Clerc (Sweden) Jan Gunnarsson
13 May	Italian Open; Rome, Italy; Clay – $350,000 – 64S/32D; Singles – Doubles	(Sweden) Anders Järryd (Sweden) Mats Wilander; 4–6, 6–3, 6–2	(United States) Ken Flach (United States) Robert Seguso	(Sweden) Mats Wilander (West Germany) Boris Becker	(Sweden) Henrik Sundström (Switzerland) Claudio Mezzadri (Argentina) José Luis Clerc (Sweden) Jan Gunnarsson
13 May	Nabisco Grand Prix de Madrid; Madrid, Spain; Clay – $80,000 – 32S/16D	(West Germany) Andreas Maurer; 7–5, 6–2	(United States) Lawson Duncan	(Czechoslovakia) Karel Nováček (Israel) Amos Mansdorf	(Haiti) Ronald Agénor (Spain) David de Miguel-Lapiedra (Argentina) Marcelo Ingaramo (Australia) Carl Limberger
13 May	Nabisco Grand Prix de Madrid; Madrid, Spain; Clay – $80,000 – 32S/16D	(Brazil) Givaldo Barbosa (Brazil) Ivan Kley; 7–6^{(8–6)}, 6–4	(Spain) Jorge Bardou (Spain) Alberto Tous	(Czechoslovakia) Karel Nováček (Israel) Amos Mansdorf	(Haiti) Ronald Agénor (Spain) David de Miguel-Lapiedra (Argentina) Marcelo Ingaramo (Australia) Carl Limberger
20 May	Torneo Internazionale Roger et Gallet; Florence, Italy; Clay – $80,000 – 32S/16D	(Spain) Sergio Casal; 3–6, 6–3, 6–2	(United States) Jimmy Arias	(Argentina) Eduardo Bengoechea (United States) Mike De Palmer	(United States) Mark Dickson (United States) Jimmy Brown (United States) Lawson Duncan (Argentina) Marcelo Ingaramo
20 May	Torneo Internazionale Roger et Gallet; Florence, Italy; Clay – $80,000 – 32S/16D	(Australia) David Graham (Australia) Laurie Warder; 6–1, 6–1	(New Zealand) Bruce Derlin (Australia) Carl Limberger	(Argentina) Eduardo Bengoechea (United States) Mike De Palmer	(United States) Mark Dickson (United States) Jimmy Brown (United States) Lawson Duncan (Argentina) Marcelo Ingaramo
20 May	Ambre Solaire World Team Cup; Düsseldorf, West Germany; Clay – $500,000 – 8 teams	United States; 2–1	Czechoslovakia		
27 May; 3 Jun	French Open; Paris, France; Grand Slam; Clay; Singles – Doubles – Mixed doubles	(Sweden) Mats Wilander; 3–6, 6–4, 6–2, 6–2	(Czechoslovakia) Ivan Lendl	(United States) John McEnroe (United States) Jimmy Connors	(Sweden) Joakim Nyström (France) Henri Leconte (Sweden) Stefan Edberg (Argentina) Martín Jaite
27 May; 3 Jun	French Open; Paris, France; Grand Slam; Clay; Singles – Doubles – Mixed doubles	(Australia) Mark Edmondson (Australia) Kim Warwick; 6–3, 6–4, 6–7, 6–3	(Israel) Schlomo Glickstein (Sweden) Hans Simonsson	(United States) John McEnroe (United States) Jimmy Connors	(Sweden) Joakim Nyström (France) Henri Leconte (Sweden) Stefan Edberg (Argentina) Martín Jaite
27 May; 3 Jun	French Open; Paris, France; Grand Slam; Clay; Singles – Doubles – Mixed doubles	(United States) Martina Navratilova (Switzerland) Heinz Günthardt; 2–6, 6–3, 6–2	(United States) Paula Smith (Paraguay) Francisco González	(United States) John McEnroe (United States) Jimmy Connors	(Sweden) Joakim Nyström (France) Henri Leconte (Sweden) Stefan Edberg (Argentina) Martín Jaite

=== June ===
Week	Tournament	Champions	Runners-up	Semifinalists	Quarterfinalists
10 Jun	Stella Artois Championships; London, Great Britain; Grass – $200,000 – 64S/32D; Singles – Doubles	(West Germany) Boris Becker; 6–2, 6–3	(United States) Johan Kriek	(Australia) Paul McNamee (Socialist Federal Republic of Yugoslavia) Slobodan Živojinović	(United States) Tim Mayotte (Australia) Pat Cash (Australia) Russell Simpson (United States) Paul Annacone
10 Jun	Stella Artois Championships; London, Great Britain; Grass – $200,000 – 64S/32D; Singles – Doubles	(United States) Ken Flach (United States) Robert Seguso; 3–6, 6–3, 16–14	(Australia) Pat Cash (Australia) John Fitzgerald	(Australia) Paul McNamee (Socialist Federal Republic of Yugoslavia) Slobodan Živojinović	(United States) Tim Mayotte (Australia) Pat Cash (Australia) Russell Simpson (United States) Paul Annacone
10 Jun	Bologna Open; Bologna, Italy; Clay – $80,000 – 32S/16D	(France) Thierry Tulasne; 6–2, 6–0	(Italy) Claudio Panatta	(Spain) Alberto Tous (West Germany) Damir Keretić	(Switzerland) Zoltan Kuharszky (Italy) Massimiliano Narducci (Haiti) Ronald Agénor (Socialist Federal Republic of Yugoslavia) Goran Prpić
10 Jun	Bologna Open; Bologna, Italy; Clay – $80,000 – 32S/16D	(Italy) Paolo Canè (Italy) Simone Colombo; 7–5, 6–4	(Spain) Jordi Arrese (Spain) Alberto Tous	(Spain) Alberto Tous (West Germany) Damir Keretić	(Switzerland) Zoltan Kuharszky (Italy) Massimiliano Narducci (Haiti) Ronald Agénor (Socialist Federal Republic of Yugoslavia) Goran Prpić
17 June	West of England Championships; Bristol, Great Britain; Grass – $100,000 – 48S/16D; Singles – Doubles	(United States) Martin Davis; 4–6, 6–3, 7–5	(United States) Glenn Layendecker	(United States) Roger Knapp (United States) Brian Teacher	(Australia) Peter Doohan (Nigeria) Nduka Odizor (France) Guy Forget (United Kingdom) Jeremy Bates
17 June	West of England Championships; Bristol, Great Britain; Grass – $100,000 – 48S/16D; Singles – Doubles	(South Africa) Eddie Edwards (South Africa) Danie Visser; 6–4, 7–6	(Australia) John Alexander (New Zealand) Russell Simpson	(United States) Roger Knapp (United States) Brian Teacher	(Australia) Peter Doohan (Nigeria) Nduka Odizor (France) Guy Forget (United Kingdom) Jeremy Bates
24 Jun; 1 Jul	Wimbledon Championships; London, Great Britain; Grand Slam; Grass; Singles – Doubles – Mixed doubles	(West Germany) Boris Becker; 6–3, 6–7^{(4–7)}, 7–6^{(7–3)}, 6–4	(United States) Kevin Curren	(United States) Jimmy Connors (Sweden) Anders Järryd	(United States) John McEnroe (Chile) Ricardo Acuña (Switzerland) Heinz Günthardt (France) Henri Leconte
24 Jun; 1 Jul	Wimbledon Championships; London, Great Britain; Grand Slam; Grass; Singles – Doubles – Mixed doubles	(Switzerland) Heinz Günthardt (Hungary) Balázs Taróczy; 6–4, 6–3, 4–6, 6–3	(Australia) Pat Cash (Australia) John Fitzgerald	(United States) Jimmy Connors (Sweden) Anders Järryd	(United States) John McEnroe (Chile) Ricardo Acuña (Switzerland) Heinz Günthardt (France) Henri Leconte
24 Jun; 1 Jul	Wimbledon Championships; London, Great Britain; Grand Slam; Grass; Singles – Doubles – Mixed doubles	(United States) Martina Navratilova (Australia) Paul McNamee; 7–5, 4–6, 6–2	(Australia) Elizabeth Smylie (Australia) John Fitzgerald	(United States) Jimmy Connors (Sweden) Anders Järryd	(United States) John McEnroe (Chile) Ricardo Acuña (Switzerland) Heinz Günthardt (France) Henri Leconte

=== July ===
Week	Tournament	Champions	Runners-up	Semifinalists	Quarterfinalists
8 Jul	Union Warren Bank; U.S. Pro Tennis Championships; Boston, United States; Clay – $267,000 – 56S/28D; Singles – Doubles	(Sweden) Mats Wilander; 6–2, 6–4	(Argentina) Martín Jaite	(Argentina) Guillermo Vilas (Socialist Federal Republic of Yugoslavia) Bruno Orešar	(Sweden) Henrik Sundström (Czechoslovakia) Libor Pimek (Spain) Juan Aguilera (Australia) Paul McNamee
8 Jul	Union Warren Bank; U.S. Pro Tennis Championships; Boston, United States; Clay – $267,000 – 56S/28D; Singles – Doubles	(Czechoslovakia) Libor Pimek (Socialist Federal Republic of Yugoslavia) Slobodan Živojinović; 2–6, 6–4, 7–6^{(8–6)}	(Australia) Peter McNamara (Australia) Paul McNamee	(Argentina) Guillermo Vilas (Socialist Federal Republic of Yugoslavia) Bruno Orešar	(Sweden) Henrik Sundström (Czechoslovakia) Libor Pimek (Spain) Juan Aguilera (Australia) Paul McNamee
8 Jul	RADO Swiss Open; Gstaad, Switzerland; Clay – $150,000 – 32S/16D	(Sweden) Joakim Nyström; 6–4, 1–6, 7–5, 6–3	(West Germany) Andreas Maurer	(France) Guy Forget (Australia) Mark Edmondson	(Poland) Wojciech Fibak (Switzerland) Heinz Günthardt (Brazil) Cássio Motta (Ecuador) Raúl Viver
8 Jul	RADO Swiss Open; Gstaad, Switzerland; Clay – $150,000 – 32S/16D	(Poland) Wojciech Fibak (Czechoslovakia) Tomáš Šmíd; 6–7, 6–4, 6–4	(Australia) Brad Drewett (Australia) Mark Edmondson	(France) Guy Forget (Australia) Mark Edmondson	(Poland) Wojciech Fibak (Switzerland) Heinz Günthardt (Brazil) Cássio Motta (Ecuador) Raúl Viver
8 Jul	Tennis Hall of Fame Championships; Newport, United States; Grass – $100,000 – 32S/16D	(United States) Tom Gullikson; 6–3, 7–5	(United States) John Sadri	(United States) David Pate (United States) Tim Mayotte	(United States) Johan Kriek (United States) Paul Annacone (United States) Scott Davis (United States) Marc Flur
8 Jul	Tennis Hall of Fame Championships; Newport, United States; Grass – $100,000 – 32S/16D	(Australia) Peter Doohan (United States) Sammy Giammalva; 6–1, 6–3	(United States) Paul Annacone (South Africa) Christo van Rensburg	(United States) David Pate (United States) Tim Mayotte	(United States) Johan Kriek (United States) Paul Annacone (United States) Scott Davis (United States) Marc Flur
15 Jul	D.C. National Bank Classic; Washington, United States; Clay – $200,000 – 56S/28D	(France) Yannick Noah; 6–4, 6–3	(Argentina) Martín Jaite	(United States) Jimmy Connors (Argentina) Marcelo Ingaramo	(Switzerland) Jakob Hlasek (United States) Aaron Krickstein (Argentina) Guillermo Vilas (Peru) Pablo Arraya
15 Jul	D.C. National Bank Classic; Washington, United States; Clay – $200,000 – 56S/28D	(Chile) Hans Gildemeister (Paraguay) Víctor Pecci	(Australia) David Graham (Hungary) Balázs Taróczy	(United States) Jimmy Connors (Argentina) Marcelo Ingaramo	(Switzerland) Jakob Hlasek (United States) Aaron Krickstein (Argentina) Guillermo Vilas (Peru) Pablo Arraya
15 Jul	Swedish Open Båstad; Båstad, Sweden; Clay – $80,000 – 32S/16D; Singles – Doubles	(Sweden) Mats Wilander; 6–1, 6–0	(Sweden) Stefan Edberg	(West Germany) Damir Keretić (Sweden) Kent Carlsson	(Socialist Federal Republic of Yugoslavia) Goran Prpić (Sweden) Henrik Sundström (Sweden) Stefan Simonsson (Italy) Alessandro de Minicis
15 Jul	Swedish Open Båstad; Båstad, Sweden; Clay – $80,000 – 32S/16D; Singles – Doubles	(Sweden) Stefan Edberg (Sweden) Anders Järryd; 6–0, 7–6	(Spain) Sergio Casal (Spain) Emilio Sánchez	(West Germany) Damir Keretić (Sweden) Kent Carlsson	(Socialist Federal Republic of Yugoslavia) Goran Prpić (Sweden) Henrik Sundström (Sweden) Stefan Simonsson (Italy) Alessandro de Minicis
22 Jul	U.S. Open Clay Court Championships; Indianapolis, United States; Clay – $300,000 – 56S/28D; Singles – Doubles	(Czechoslovakia) Ivan Lendl; 6–1, 6–3	(Ecuador) Andrés Gómez	(West Germany) Boris Becker (France) Yannick Noah	(Argentina) Martín Jaite (Czechoslovakia) Miloslav Mečíř (West Germany) Hans Schwaier (Czechoslovakia) Jaroslav Navrátil
22 Jul	U.S. Open Clay Court Championships; Indianapolis, United States; Clay – $300,000 – 56S/28D; Singles – Doubles	(United States) Ken Flach (United States) Robert Seguso; 6–4, 6–4	(Czechoslovakia) Pavel Složil (Australia) Kim Warwick	(West Germany) Boris Becker (France) Yannick Noah	(Argentina) Martín Jaite (Czechoslovakia) Miloslav Mečíř (West Germany) Hans Schwaier (Czechoslovakia) Jaroslav Navrátil
22 Jul	Volvo Tennis Open; Livingston, United States; Hard – $80,000 – 32S/16D; Singles – Doubles	(United States) Brad Gilbert; 4–6, 7–5, 6–0	(United States) Brian Teacher	(United States) Johan Kriek (United States) Jim Grabb	(South Africa) Danie Visser (United States) Sammy Giammalva (United States) Bob Green (United States) Paul Annacone
22 Jul	Volvo Tennis Open; Livingston, United States; Hard – $80,000 – 32S/16D; Singles – Doubles	(United States) Mike De Palmer (Australia) Peter Doohan; 6–3, 6–4	(South Africa) Eddie Edwards (South Africa) Danie Visser	(United States) Johan Kriek (United States) Jim Grabb	(South Africa) Danie Visser (United States) Sammy Giammalva (United States) Bob Green (United States) Paul Annacone
22 Jul	Dutch Open; Hilversum, Netherlands; Clay – $80,000 – 32S/16D; Singles – Doubles	(West Germany) Ricki Osterthun; 4–6, 4–6, 6–4, 6–2, 6–3	(Sweden) Kent Carlsson	(Netherlands) Menno Oosting (West Germany) Andreas Maurer	(Netherlands) Michiel Schapers (Australia) Darren Cahill (Netherlands) Huub van Boeckel (Czechoslovakia) Tomáš Šmíd
22 Jul	Dutch Open; Hilversum, Netherlands; Clay – $80,000 – 32S/16D; Singles – Doubles	(Sweden) Hans Simonsson (Sweden) Stefan Simonsson; 6–3, 6–4	(Australia) Carl Limberger (Australia) Mark Woodforde	(Netherlands) Menno Oosting (West Germany) Andreas Maurer	(Netherlands) Michiel Schapers (Australia) Darren Cahill (Netherlands) Huub van Boeckel (Czechoslovakia) Tomáš Šmíd
29 Jul	1985 Davis Cup; Hamburg, West Germany – clay Guayaquil, Ecuador – clay Sydney, Australia – grass Bangalore, India	Quarterfinal Winners; West Germany 3–2; Czechoslovakia 5–0; Australia 3–2; Sweden 4–1	Quarterfinal Losers; United States; Ecuador; Paraguay; India		

=== August ===
Week	Tournament	Champions	Runners-up	Semifinalists	Quarterfinalists
5 Aug	Volvo International; Stratton Mountain, United States; Hard – $250,000 – 64S/32D; Singles – Doubles	(United States) John McEnroe; 7–6^{(7–4)}, 6–2	(Czechoslovakia) Ivan Lendl	(United States) Robert Seguso (United States) Jimmy Connors	(United States) Paul Annacone (United States) Scott Davis (United States) Tim Mayotte (United States) Brad Gilbert
5 Aug	Volvo International; Stratton Mountain, United States; Hard – $250,000 – 64S/32D; Singles – Doubles	(United States) Scott Davis (United States) David Pate; 3–6, 7–6, 7–6	(United States) Ken Flach (United States) Robert Seguso	(United States) Robert Seguso (United States) Jimmy Connors	(United States) Paul Annacone (United States) Scott Davis (United States) Tim Mayotte (United States) Brad Gilbert
5 Aug	Head Cup; Kitzbühel, Austria; Clay – $150,000 – 32S/16D	(Czechoslovakia) Pavel Složil; 7–5, 6–2	(West Germany) Michael Westphal	(Czechoslovakia) Marián Vajda (Spain) Sergio Casal	(Sweden) Kent Carlsson (France) Henri Leconte (France) Thierry Tulasne (Spain) Emilio Sánchez
5 Aug	Head Cup; Kitzbühel, Austria; Clay – $150,000 – 32S/16D	(Spain) Sergio Casal (Spain) Emilio Sánchez; 6–4, 7–6	(Italy) Paolo Canè (Italy) Claudio Panatta	(Czechoslovakia) Marián Vajda (Spain) Sergio Casal	(Sweden) Kent Carlsson (France) Henri Leconte (France) Thierry Tulasne (Spain) Emilio Sánchez
12 Aug	Player's International Tennis Championships; Montreal, Quebec, Canada; Hard – $300,000 – 56S/28D; Singles – Doubles	(United States) John McEnroe; 7–5, 6–3	(Czechoslovakia) Ivan Lendl	(United States) Jimmy Connors (United States) Jimmy Arias	(India) Ramesh Krishnan (Sweden) Stefan Edberg (United States) Eliot Teltscher (Sweden) Anders Järryd
12 Aug	Player's International Tennis Championships; Montreal, Quebec, Canada; Hard – $300,000 – 56S/28D; Singles – Doubles	(United States) Ken Flach (United States) Robert Seguso; 7–5, 7–6	(Sweden) Stefan Edberg (Sweden) Anders Järryd	(United States) Jimmy Connors (United States) Jimmy Arias	(India) Ramesh Krishnan (Sweden) Stefan Edberg (United States) Eliot Teltscher (Sweden) Anders Järryd
12 Aug	Society Bank Tennis Classic; Cleveland, United States; Hard – $80,000 – 32S/16D	(United States) Brad Gilbert; 6–3, 6–2	(Australia) Brad Drewett	(United States) Bud Schultz (United States) Hank Pfister	(Republic of Ireland) Matt Doyle (United States) Mike Bauer (Chile) Ricardo Acuña (United States) David Pate
12 Aug	Society Bank Tennis Classic; Cleveland, United States; Hard – $80,000 – 32S/16D	(Finland) Leo Palin (Finland) Olli Rahnasto; 6–3, 6–7, 7–6	(United States) Hank Pfister (United States) Ben Testerman	(United States) Bud Schultz (United States) Hank Pfister	(Republic of Ireland) Matt Doyle (United States) Mike Bauer (Chile) Ricardo Acuña (United States) David Pate
19 Aug	ATP Championship; Mason, United States; Hard – $375,000 – 64S/32D; Singles – Doubles	(West Germany) Boris Becker; 6–4, 6–2	(Sweden) Mats Wilander	(United States) Tim Wilkison (Sweden) Joakim Nyström	(Sweden) Stefan Edberg (United States) Jimmy Brown (United States) Hank Pfister (Sweden) Anders Järryd
19 Aug	ATP Championship; Mason, United States; Hard – $375,000 – 64S/32D; Singles – Doubles	(Sweden) Stefan Edberg (Sweden) Anders Järryd; 4–6, 6–2, 6–3	(Sweden) Joakim Nyström (Sweden) Mats Wilander	(United States) Tim Wilkison (Sweden) Joakim Nyström	(Sweden) Stefan Edberg (United States) Jimmy Brown (United States) Hank Pfister (Sweden) Anders Järryd
27 Aug	US Open; New York City, United States; Grand Slam; Hard; Singles – Doubles – Mixed doubles	(Czechoslovakia) Ivan Lendl; 7–6^{(7–1)}, 6–3, 6–4	(United States) John McEnroe	(Sweden) Mats Wilander (United States) Jimmy Connors	(Sweden) Joakim Nyström (Sweden) Anders Järryd (Switzerland) Heinz Günthardt (France) Yannick Noah
27 Aug	US Open; New York City, United States; Grand Slam; Hard; Singles – Doubles – Mixed doubles	(United States) Ken Flach (United States) Robert Seguso; 6–7^{(5–7)}, 7–6^{(7–1)}, 7–6^{(8–6)}, 6–0	(France) Henri Leconte (France) Yannick Noah	(Sweden) Mats Wilander (United States) Jimmy Connors	(Sweden) Joakim Nyström (Sweden) Anders Järryd (Switzerland) Heinz Günthardt (France) Yannick Noah
27 Aug	US Open; New York City, United States; Grand Slam; Hard; Singles – Doubles – Mixed doubles	(United States) Martina Navratilova (Switzerland) Heinz Günthardt; 6–3, 6–4	(Australia) Elizabeth Smylie (Australia) John Fitzgerald	(Sweden) Mats Wilander (United States) Jimmy Connors	(Sweden) Joakim Nyström (Sweden) Anders Järryd (Switzerland) Heinz Günthardt (France) Yannick Noah

=== September ===
Week	Tournament	Champions	Runners-up	Semifinalists	Quarterfinalists
9 Sep	Mercedes Cup; Stuttgart, West Germany; Clay – $100,000 – 32S/16D; Singles – Doubles	(Czechoslovakia) Ivan Lendl; 6–4, 6–0	(United States) Brad Gilbert	(Argentina) José Luis Clerc (Czechoslovakia) Tomáš Šmíd	(Haiti) Ronald Agénor (Sweden) Jan Gunnarsson (West Germany) Andreas Maurer (West Germany) Udo Riglewski
9 Sep	Mercedes Cup; Stuttgart, West Germany; Clay – $100,000 – 32S/16D; Singles – Doubles	(Czechoslovakia) Ivan Lendl (Czechoslovakia) Tomáš Šmíd; 3–6, 6–4, 6–2	(United States) Andy Kohlberg (Brazil) João Soares	(Argentina) José Luis Clerc (Czechoslovakia) Tomáš Šmíd	(Haiti) Ronald Agénor (Sweden) Jan Gunnarsson (West Germany) Andreas Maurer (West Germany) Udo Riglewski
9 Sep	Campionati Internazionali di Sicilia; Palermo, Italy; Clay – $100,000 – 32S/16D	(France) Thierry Tulasne; 6–3, 6–1	(Sweden) Joakim Nyström	(Uruguay) Diego Pérez (Austria) Thomas Muster	(Argentina) Roberto Argüello (Socialist Federal Republic of Yugoslavia) Goran Prpić (Italy) Claudio Pistolesi (Italy) Francesco Cancellotti
9 Sep	Campionati Internazionali di Sicilia; Palermo, Italy; Clay – $100,000 – 32S/16D	(United Kingdom) Colin Dowdeswell (Sweden) Joakim Nyström; 6–4, 6–7, 7–6	(Spain) Sergio Casal (Spain) Emilio Sánchez	(Uruguay) Diego Pérez (Austria) Thomas Muster	(Argentina) Roberto Argüello (Socialist Federal Republic of Yugoslavia) Goran Prpić (Italy) Claudio Pistolesi (Italy) Francesco Cancellotti
16 Sep	Volvo Tennis Los Angeles; Los Angeles, United States; Hard – $315,000 – 32S/16D; Singles – Doubles	(United States) Paul Annacone; 7–6^{(7–5)}, 6–7^{(8–10)}, 7–6^{(7–4)}	(Sweden) Stefan Edberg	(United States) John McEnroe (United States) Johan Kriek	(United States) Brad Gilbert (United States) Scott Davis (United States) Jimmy Arias (India) Ramesh Krishnan
16 Sep	Volvo Tennis Los Angeles; Los Angeles, United States; Hard – $315,000 – 32S/16D; Singles – Doubles	(United States) Scott Davis (United States) Robert Van't Hof; 6–3, 7–6	(United States) Paul Annacone (South Africa) Christo van Rensburg	(United States) John McEnroe (United States) Johan Kriek	(United States) Brad Gilbert (United States) Scott Davis (United States) Jimmy Arias (India) Ramesh Krishnan
16 Sep	Martini Open; Geneva, Switzerland; Clay – $100,000 – 32S/16D; Singles – Doubles	(Czechoslovakia) Tomáš Šmíd; 6–4, 6–4	(Sweden) Mats Wilander	(France) Henri Leconte (Spain) Juan Aguilera	(Switzerland) Jakob Hlasek (Czechoslovakia) Marián Vajda (Argentina) Roberto Argüello (Mexico) Leonardo Lavalle
16 Sep	Martini Open; Geneva, Switzerland; Clay – $100,000 – 32S/16D; Singles – Doubles	(Spain) Sergio Casal (Spain) Emilio Sánchez; 6–4, 4–6, 7–5	(Brazil) Carlos Kirmayr (Brazil) Cássio Motta	(France) Henri Leconte (Spain) Juan Aguilera	(Switzerland) Jakob Hlasek (Czechoslovakia) Marián Vajda (Argentina) Roberto Argüello (Mexico) Leonardo Lavalle
16 Sep	Nabisco Grand Prix Passing Shot; Bordeaux, France; Clay – $80,000 – 32S/16D; Singles – Doubles	(Uruguay) Diego Pérez; 6–4, 7–6	(United States) Jimmy Brown	(Argentina) José Luis Clerc (France) Thierry Tulasne	(Haiti) Ronald Agénor (Spain) Jorge Bardou (Mexico) Francisco Maciel (Czechoslovakia) Libor Pimek
16 Sep	Nabisco Grand Prix Passing Shot; Bordeaux, France; Clay – $80,000 – 32S/16D; Singles – Doubles	(United Kingdom) David Felgate (United Kingdom) Steve Shaw; 6–4, 5–7, 6–4	(Czechoslovakia) Libor Pimek (United States) Blaine Willenborg	(Argentina) José Luis Clerc (France) Thierry Tulasne	(Haiti) Ronald Agénor (Spain) Jorge Bardou (Mexico) Francisco Maciel (Czechoslovakia) Libor Pimek
23 Sep	Transamerica Open; San Francisco, United States; Carpet – $277,000 – 32S/16D; Singles – Doubles	(Sweden) Stefan Edberg; 6–4, 6–2	(United States) Johan Kriek	(United States) Bob Green (United States) Paul Annacone	(United States) John McEnroe (United States) Eliot Teltscher (United States) Brad Gilbert (United States) Tim Mayotte
23 Sep	Transamerica Open; San Francisco, United States; Carpet – $277,000 – 32S/16D; Singles – Doubles	(United States) Paul Annacone (South Africa) Christo van Rensburg; 3–6, 6–3, 6–4	(United States) Brad Gilbert (United States) Sandy Mayer	(United States) Bob Green (United States) Paul Annacone	(United States) John McEnroe (United States) Eliot Teltscher (United States) Brad Gilbert (United States) Tim Mayotte
23 Sep	International Championships of Spain; Barcelona, Spain; Clay – $210,000 – 64S/32D	(France) Thierry Tulasne; 0–6, 6–2, 3–6, 6–4, 6–0	(Sweden) Mats Wilander	(Argentina) Martín Jaite (France) Henri Leconte	(Spain) Sergio Casal (Sweden) Kent Carlsson (Sweden) Anders Järryd (Spain) Emilio Sánchez
23 Sep	International Championships of Spain; Barcelona, Spain; Clay – $210,000 – 64S/32D	(Spain) Sergio Casal (Spain) Emilio Sánchez; 6–3, 6–3	(Sweden) Jan Gunnarsson (Denmark) Michael Mortensen	(Argentina) Martín Jaite (France) Henri Leconte	(Spain) Sergio Casal (Sweden) Kent Carlsson (Sweden) Anders Järryd (Spain) Emilio Sánchez
30 Sep	1985 Davis Cup; Frankfurt, West Germany – carpet (i); Malmö, Sweden – clay (i)	Semifinal Winners; West Germany 5–0; Sweden 5–0	Semifinal Losers; Australia; Czechoslovakia		

=== October ===
Week	Tournament	Champions	Runners-up	Semifinalists	Quarterfinalists
7 Oct	Altech South African Open; Johannesburg, South Africa; Hard – $210,000 – 32S/16D; Singles – Doubles	(United States) Matt Anger; 6–4, 3–6, 6–3, 6–2	(United States) Brad Gilbert	(United States) Jimmy Arias (United States) Johan Kriek	(United States) Kevin Curren (United States) John Sadri (Canada) Martin Wostenholme (United States) Mike de Palmer
7 Oct	Altech South African Open; Johannesburg, South Africa; Hard – $210,000 – 32S/16D; Singles – Doubles	(United Kingdom) Colin Dowdeswell (South Africa) Christo van Rensburg; 3–6, 7–6, 6–4	(Israel) Amos Mansdorf (Israel) Shahar Perkiss	(United States) Jimmy Arias (United States) Johan Kriek	(United States) Kevin Curren (United States) John Sadri (Canada) Martin Wostenholme (United States) Mike de Palmer
7 Oct	Nabisco Grand Prix de Toulouse; Toulouse, France; Hard (i) – $125,000 – 32S/16D; Singles – Doubles	(France) Yannick Noah; 6–4, 6–4	(Czechoslovakia) Tomáš Šmíd	(France) Guy Forget (India) Ramesh Krishnan	(Switzerland) Jakob Hlasek (Czechoslovakia) Libor Pimek (Sweden) Jan Gunnarsson (France) Jérôme Potier
7 Oct	Nabisco Grand Prix de Toulouse; Toulouse, France; Hard (i) – $125,000 – 32S/16D; Singles – Doubles	(Chile) Ricardo Acuña (Switzerland) Jakob Hlasek; 3–6, 6–2, 9–7	(Czechoslovakia) Pavel Složil (Czechoslovakia) Tomáš Šmíd	(France) Guy Forget (India) Ramesh Krishnan	(Switzerland) Jakob Hlasek (Czechoslovakia) Libor Pimek (Sweden) Jan Gunnarsson (France) Jérôme Potier
7 Oct	GWA Mazda Tennis Classic; Brisbane, Australia; Carpet – $80,000 – 32S/16D; Singles – Doubles	(United States) Paul Annacone; 6–3, 6–3	(New Zealand) Kelly Evernden	(Australia) Simon Youl (United States) Glenn Layendecker	(United States) Marty Davis (New Zealand) Russell Simpson (United States) Bud Schultz (United States) Ben Testerman
7 Oct	GWA Mazda Tennis Classic; Brisbane, Australia; Carpet – $80,000 – 32S/16D; Singles – Doubles	(United States) Marty Davis (Australia) Brad Drewett; 6–2, 6–2	(United States) Bud Schultz (United States) Ben Testerman	(Australia) Simon Youl (United States) Glenn Layendecker	(United States) Marty Davis (New Zealand) Russell Simpson (United States) Bud Schultz (United States) Ben Testerman
14 Oct	Custom Credit Australian Indoor Championships; Sydney, Australia; Hard (i) – $280,000 – 32S/16D; Singles – Doubles	(Czechoslovakia) Ivan Lendl; 6–4, 6–4, 7–6	(France) Henri Leconte	(United States) Paul Annacone (Australia) John Fitzgerald	(United States) Ben Testerman (United States) Chip Hooper (Ecuador) Andrés Gómez (Australia) Simon Youl
14 Oct	Custom Credit Australian Indoor Championships; Sydney, Australia; Hard (i) – $280,000 – 32S/16D; Singles – Doubles	(Australia) John Fitzgerald (Sweden) Anders Järryd; 6–3, 6–2	(Australia) Mark Edmondson (Australia) Kim Warwick	(United States) Paul Annacone (Australia) John Fitzgerald	(United States) Ben Testerman (United States) Chip Hooper (Ecuador) Andrés Gómez (Australia) Simon Youl
14 Oct	Swiss Indoors; Basel, Switzerland; Hard (i) – $150,000 – 32S/16D	(Sweden) Stefan Edberg; 6–7^{(7–9)}, 6–4, 7–6^{(7–5)}, 6–1	(France) Yannick Noah	(Czechoslovakia) Libor Pimek (Poland) Wojciech Fibak	(France) Guy Forget (Czechoslovakia) Miloslav Mečíř (France) Thierry Tulasne (West Germany) Hans Schwaier
14 Oct	Swiss Indoors; Basel, Switzerland; Hard (i) – $150,000 – 32S/16D	(United States) Tim Gullikson (United States) Tom Gullikson; 4–6, 6–4, 6–4	(United States) Mark Dickson (United States) Tim Wilkison	(Czechoslovakia) Libor Pimek (Poland) Wojciech Fibak	(France) Guy Forget (Czechoslovakia) Miloslav Mečíř (France) Thierry Tulasne (West Germany) Hans Schwaier
14 Oct	Japan and Asian Open Tennis Championships; Tokyo, Japan; Hard – $125,000 – 64S/32S; Singles – Doubles	(United States) Scott Davis; 6–1, 7–6^{(7–3)}	(United States) Jimmy Arias	(Canada) Glenn Michibata (Sweden) Johan Carlsson	(United States) Greg Holmes (United States) Matt Anger (United States) Jonathan Canter (United States) Sammy Giammalva
14 Oct	Japan and Asian Open Tennis Championships; Tokyo, Japan; Hard – $125,000 – 64S/32S; Singles – Doubles	(United States) Scott Davis (United States) David Pate; 7–6^{(7–3)}, 6–7^{(6–8)}, 6–3	(United States) Sammy Giammalva, Jr. (United States) Greg Holmes	(Canada) Glenn Michibata (Sweden) Johan Carlsson	(United States) Greg Holmes (United States) Matt Anger (United States) Jonathan Canter (United States) Sammy Giammalva
14 Oct	Israel Tennis Center Classic; Tel Aviv, Israel; Hard – $80,000 – 32S/16D; Singles – Doubles	(United States) Brad Gilbert; 6–3, 6–2	(Israel) Amos Mansdorf	(Israel) Shahar Perkiss (United Kingdom) Jeremy Bates	(Italy) Gianni Ocleppo (West Germany) Eric Jelen (Sweden) Peter Carlsson (Romania) Florin Segărceanu
14 Oct	Israel Tennis Center Classic; Tel Aviv, Israel; Hard – $80,000 – 32S/16D; Singles – Doubles	(United States) Brad Gilbert (Romania) Ilie Năstase; 6–3, 6–2	(South Africa) Michael Robertson (Romania) Florin Segărceanu	(Israel) Shahar Perkiss (United Kingdom) Jeremy Bates	(Italy) Gianni Ocleppo (West Germany) Eric Jelen (Sweden) Peter Carlsson (Romania) Florin Segărceanu
21 Oct	Seiko Super Tennis; Tokyo, Japan; Carpet – $375,000 – 32S/16D; Singles – Doubles	(Czechoslovakia) Ivan Lendl; 6–0, 6–4	(Sweden) Mats Wilander	(West Germany) Boris Becker (United States) Jimmy Connors	(United States) Tim Mayotte (Sweden) Anders Järryd (United States) Vincent Van Patten (Ecuador) Andrés Gómez
21 Oct	Seiko Super Tennis; Tokyo, Japan; Carpet – $375,000 – 32S/16D; Singles – Doubles	(United States) Ken Flach (United States) Robert Seguso; 4–6, 6–3, 7–6	(United States) Scott Davis (United States) David Pate	(West Germany) Boris Becker (United States) Jimmy Connors	(United States) Tim Mayotte (Sweden) Anders Järryd (United States) Vincent Van Patten (Ecuador) Andrés Gómez
21 Oct	Black & Decker Indoor Championships; Melbourne, Australia; Carpet – $100,000 – 32S/16D; Singles – Doubles	(United States) Marty Davis; 6–4, 6–4	(United States) Paul Annacone	(South Africa) Christo van Rensburg (United States) Ben Testerman	(Australia) Wally Masur (Australia) Mark Woodforde (Australia) Broderick Dyke (Australia) Peter McNamara
21 Oct	Black & Decker Indoor Championships; Melbourne, Australia; Carpet – $100,000 – 32S/16D; Singles – Doubles	(Australia) Brad Drewett (United States) Matt Mitchell; 4–6, 7–6, 6–4	(United States) David Dowlen (Nigeria) Nduka Odizor	(South Africa) Christo van Rensburg (United States) Ben Testerman	(Australia) Wally Masur (Australia) Mark Woodforde (Australia) Broderick Dyke (Australia) Peter McNamara
21 Oct	Cologne Cup; Cologne, West Germany; Hard (i) – $80,000 – 32S/16D; Singles – Doubles	(Sweden) Peter Lundgren; 6–3, 6–2	(India) Ramesh Krishnan	(United States) Mark Dickson (United States) Tim Wilkison	(Argentina) Horacio de la Peña (United Kingdom) John Lloyd (United States) Tom Gullikson (United Kingdom) Jeremy Bates
21 Oct	Cologne Cup; Cologne, West Germany; Hard (i) – $80,000 – 32S/16D; Singles – Doubles	(Austria) Alex Antonitsch (Netherlands) Michiel Schapers; 6–4, 7–5	(Sweden) Jan Gunnarsson (Sweden) Peter Lundgren	(United States) Mark Dickson (United States) Tim Wilkison	(Argentina) Horacio de la Peña (United Kingdom) John Lloyd (United States) Tom Gullikson (United Kingdom) Jeremy Bates

=== November ===
Week	Tournament	Champions	Runners-up	Semifinalists	Quarterfinalists
4 Nov	Stockholm Open; Stockholm, Sweden; Hard (i) – $375,000 – 32S/16D; Singles – Doubles	(United States) John McEnroe; 6–1, 6–2	(Sweden) Anders Järryd	(Sweden) Stefan Edberg (Sweden) Joakim Nyström	(Sweden) Peter Lundgren (Spain) Sergio Casal (France) Yannick Noah (Switzerland) Jakob Hlasek
4 Nov	Stockholm Open; Stockholm, Sweden; Hard (i) – $375,000 – 32S/16D; Singles – Doubles	(France) Guy Forget (Ecuador) Andrés Gómez; 6–3, 6–4	(United States) Mike De Palmer (United States) Gary Donnelly	(Sweden) Stefan Edberg (Sweden) Joakim Nyström	(Sweden) Peter Lundgren (Spain) Sergio Casal (France) Yannick Noah (Switzerland) Jakob Hlasek
11 Nov	Benson and Hedges Championships; London, Great Britain; Carpet – $375,000 – 32S/16D; Singles – Doubles	(Czechoslovakia) Ivan Lendl; 6–7^{(6–8)}, 6–3, 4–6, 6–4, 6–4	(West Germany) Boris Becker	(United States) David Pate (Sweden) Anders Järryd	(United States) Johan Kriek (Sweden) Joakim Nyström (India) Ramesh Krishnan (United States) Mike Leach
11 Nov	Benson and Hedges Championships; London, Great Britain; Carpet – $375,000 – 32S/16D; Singles – Doubles	(France) Guy Forget (Sweden) Anders Järryd; 7–5, 4–6, 7–5	(West Germany) Boris Becker (Socialist Federal Republic of Yugoslavia) Slobodan Živojinović	(United States) David Pate (Sweden) Anders Järryd	(United States) Johan Kriek (Sweden) Joakim Nyström (India) Ramesh Krishnan (United States) Mike Leach
18 Nov	Seiko Super Tennis Hong Kong; Hong Kong, Hong Kong; Hard – $200,000 – 32S/16D	(Ecuador) Andrés Gómez; 6–3, 6–3, 3–6, 6–4	(United States) Aaron Krickstein	(United States) Bud Schultz (Switzerland) Jakob Hlasek	(Mexico) Leonardo Lavalle (United States) Jonathan Canter (United States) Matt Anger (Czechoslovakia) Tomáš Šmíd
18 Nov	Seiko Super Tennis Hong Kong; Hong Kong, Hong Kong; Hard – $200,000 – 32S/16D	(Australia) Brad Drewett (Australia) Kim Warwick; 3–6, 6–4, 6–2	(Switzerland) Jakob Hlasek (Czechoslovakia) Tomáš Šmíd	(United States) Bud Schultz (Switzerland) Jakob Hlasek	(Mexico) Leonardo Lavalle (United States) Jonathan Canter (United States) Matt Anger (Czechoslovakia) Tomáš Šmíd
18 Nov	Fischer Cup; Vienna Austria; Hard(i) – $100,000 – 32S/16D; Singles – Doubles	(Sweden) Jan Gunnarsson; 6–7^{(5–7)}, 6–2, 6–4, 1–6, 7–5	(Czechoslovakia) Libor Pimek	(Switzerland) Heinz Günthardt (West Germany) Andreas Maurer	(West Germany) Michael Westphal (Haiti) Ronald Agénor (United States) Mike De Palmer (Argentina) Martín Jaite
18 Nov	Fischer Cup; Vienna Austria; Hard(i) – $100,000 – 32S/16D; Singles – Doubles	(United States) Mike De Palmer (United States) Gary Donnelly; 6–4, 6–3	(Spain) Sergio Casal (Spain) Emilio Sánchez	(Switzerland) Heinz Günthardt (West Germany) Andreas Maurer	(West Germany) Michael Westphal (Haiti) Ronald Agénor (United States) Mike De Palmer (Argentina) Martín Jaite
25 Nov; 2 Dec	Australian Open; Melbourne, Australia; Grand Slam; Grass; Singles – Doubles	(Sweden) Stefan Edberg; 6–4, 6–3, 6–3	(Sweden) Mats Wilander	(Czechoslovakia) Ivan Lendl (Socialist Federal Republic of Yugoslavia) Slobodan Živojinović	(United Kingdom) John Lloyd (Netherlands) Michiel Schapers (United States) Johan Kriek (United States) John McEnroe
25 Nov; 2 Dec	Australian Open; Melbourne, Australia; Grand Slam; Grass; Singles – Doubles	(United States) Paul Annacone (South Africa) Christo van Rensburg; 3–6, 7–6, 6–4, 6–4	(Australia) Mark Edmondson (Australia) Kim Warwick	(Czechoslovakia) Ivan Lendl (Socialist Federal Republic of Yugoslavia) Slobodan Živojinović	(United Kingdom) John Lloyd (Netherlands) Michiel Schapers (United States) Johan Kriek (United States) John McEnroe

=== December ===
Week	Tournament	Champions	Runners-up	Semifinalists	Quarterfinalists
9 Dec	Alberto New South Wales Men's Open; Sydney, Australia; Grass – $125,000 – 56S/28D	(France) Henri Leconte; 6–7, 6–2, 6–3	(New Zealand) Kelly Evernden	(United States) Matt Anger (United States) Mark Dickson	(United States) Bud Schultz (Australia) Wally Masur (South Africa) Christo Steyn (United States) Tim Mayotte
9 Dec	Alberto New South Wales Men's Open; Sydney, Australia; Grass – $125,000 – 56S/28D	(United States) David Dowlen (Nigeria) Nduka Odizor; 6–4, 7–6	(Australia) Broderick Dyke (Australia) Wally Masur	(United States) Matt Anger (United States) Mark Dickson	(United States) Bud Schultz (Australia) Wally Masur (South Africa) Christo Steyn (United States) Tim Mayotte
16 Dec	Sunbeam Open; Adelaide, Australia; Grass – $80,000 – 32S/16D; Singles – Doubles	(South Africa) Eddie Edwards; 6–2, 6–4	(Australia) Peter Doohan	(Australia) Wally Masur (South Africa) Christo Steyn	(Australia) Roberto Saad (Israel) Amos Mansdorf (United States) Leif Shiras (Australia) John Fitzgerald
16 Dec	Sunbeam Open; Adelaide, Australia; Grass – $80,000 – 32S/16D; Singles – Doubles	(Australia) Mark Edmondson (Australia) Kim Warwick; 6–4, 6–4	(Brazil) Nelson Aerts (United States) Tomm Warneke	(Australia) Wally Masur (South Africa) Christo Steyn	(Australia) Roberto Saad (Israel) Amos Mansdorf (United States) Leif Shiras (Australia) John Fitzgerald
16 Dec	Davis Cup by NEC: Final; Munich, West Germany – carpet	Sweden; 3–2	West Germany		
23 Dec	Jason Victorian Open; Melbourne, Australia; Grass – $80,000 – 32S/16D; Singles – Doubles	(United States) Jonathan Canter; 5–7, 6–3, 6–4	(Australia) Peter Doohan	(Australia) Mark Kratzmann (Australia) Mark Edmondson	(South Africa) Michael Robertson (United States) Bill Scanlon (South Africa) Eddie Edwards (Australia) Broderick Dyke
23 Dec	Jason Victorian Open; Melbourne, Australia; Grass – $80,000 – 32S/16D; Singles – Doubles	(Australia) Darren Cahill (Australia) Peter Carter; 7–6^{(7–3)}, 6–1	(United States) Brett Dickinson (Argentina) Roberto Saad	(Australia) Mark Kratzmann (Australia) Mark Edmondson	(South Africa) Michael Robertson (United States) Bill Scanlon (South Africa) Eddie Edwards (Australia) Broderick Dyke

=== January 1986 ===
Week	Tournament	Champions	Runners-up	Semifinalists	Quarterfinalists
13 Jan	Nabisco Masters; New York City, United States; Carpet – $400,000 – 16S/8D; Singles – Doubles	(Czechoslovakia) Ivan Lendl; 6–2, 7–6^{(7–1)}, 6–3	(West Germany) Boris Becker	(Ecuador) Andrés Gómez (Sweden) Anders Järryd	(United States) Tim Mayotte (United States) Johan Kriek (Sweden) Mats Wilander (United States) Brad Gilbert
13 Jan	Nabisco Masters; New York City, United States; Carpet – $400,000 – 16S/8D; Singles – Doubles	(Sweden) Stefan Edberg (Sweden) Anders Järryd; 6–1, 7–6^{(7–5)}	(Sweden) Joakim Nyström (Sweden) Mats Wilander	(Ecuador) Andrés Gómez (Sweden) Anders Järryd	(United States) Tim Mayotte (United States) Johan Kriek (Sweden) Mats Wilander (United States) Brad Gilbert

== Standings ==
The 1985 Grand Prix tournaments were divided in 18 separate point categories, ranging from the Grand Slam tournaments (700 points for the Singles winner and 120 points for Doubles winner) to the smallest Regular Series tournaments (80 points for the Singles winner and 15 points for Doubles winner). At the end of the year the top 64 Singles players and top 24 Doubles players received bonuses from a $4,000,000 bonus pool. To qualify for a bonus a player must have participated in at least 14 tournaments. The best 16 players in the points standing at the end of the season qualified for the Nabisco Masters which was played in January 1986.

Singles
Rk	Country	Name	Points	Bonus
1	TCH	Ivan Lendl	4,459	$800,000
2	USA	John McEnroe	4,103	$550,000
3	SWE	Mats Wilander	3,308	$400,000
4	SWE	Stefan Edberg	2,511	$250,000
5	FRG	Boris Becker	2,233	$150,000
6	USA	Jimmy Connors	2,178	$100,000
7	FRA	Yannick Noah	1,886	$75,000
8	SWE	Anders Järryd	1,860	$55,000
9	USA	Johan Kriek	1,497	$45,000
10	SWE	Joakim Nyström	1,482	$40,000

Doubles
Rk	Country	Name	Points	Bonus
1	USA	Robert Seguso	769	$165,000
2	USA	Ken Flach	765	$120,000
3	RSA	Christo van Rensburg	671	$90,000
4	AUS	Kim Warwick	587	$70,000
5	USA	Paul Annacone	584	$50,000
6	SWE	Anders Järryd	574	$40,000
7	TCH	Tomáš Šmíd	513	$30,000
8	SWE	Mats Wilander	467	$25,000
9	TCH	Pavel Složil	452	$20,000
10	AUS	John Fitzgerald	437	$17,000

== ATP rankings ==
As of 2 January 1985
Rk	Name	Nation
1	John McEnroe	USA
2	Jimmy Connors	USA
3	Ivan Lendl	TCH
4	Mats Wilander	SWE
5	Andrés Gómez	ECU
6	Anders Järryd	SWE
7	Henrik Sundström	SWE
8	Pat Cash	AUS
9	Eliot Teltscher	USA
10	Yannick Noah	FRA
11	Joakim Nyström	SWE
12	Aaron Krickstein	USA
13	Johan Kriek	USA
14	Jimmy Arias	USA
15	Kevin Curren	RSA
16	Tomáš Šmíd	TCH
17	Vitas Gerulaitis	USA
18	Gene Mayer	USA
19	Juan Aguilera	ESP
20	Stefan Edberg	SWE

Year-end rankings 1985 (30 December 1985)
Rk	Name	Nation	High	Low	Change
1	Ivan Lendl	TCH	1	3	▲ +2
2	John McEnroe	USA	1	2	▼ –1
3	Mats Wilander	SWE	3	4	▲ +1
4	Jimmy Connors	USA	2	4	▼ –2
5	Stefan Edberg	SWE	5	20	▲ +15
6	Boris Becker	FRG	6	65	▲ +59
7	Yannick Noah	FRA	7	10	▲ +3
8	Anders Järryd	SWE	6	8	▼ –2
9	Miloslav Mečíř	TCH	9	60	▲ +51
10	Kevin Curren	USA	10	15	▲ +5
11	Joakim Nyström	SWE			=
12	Tim Mayotte	USA			▲ +32
13	Paul Annacone	USA			▲ +84
14	Johan Kriek	USA			▼ –1
15	Andrés Gómez	ECU			▼ –10
16	Henri Leconte	FRA			▲ +10
17	Scott Davis	USA			▲ +31
18	Brad Gilbert	USA			▲ +5
19	Tomáš Šmíd	TCH			▼ –3
20	Martín Jaite	ARG			▲ +35

== List of tournament winners ==
The list of winners and number of Grand Prix singles titles won, alphabetically by last name:

- (United States) Matt Anger (1) Johannesburg
- (United States) Paul Annacone (1) Brisbane
- (West Germany) Boris Becker (3) Queen's Club, Cincinnati, Wimbledon
- (United States) Jonathan Canter (1) Melbourne
- (Spain) Sergio Casal (1) Florence
- (South Africa) Kevin Curren (1) Toronto Indoor
- (United States) Marty Davis (2) Bristol, Melbourne Indoor
- (United States) Scott Davis (1) Tokyo Outdoor
- (Sweden) Stefan Edberg (4) Memphis, San Francisco, Basel, Australian Open
- (South Africa) Eddie Edwards (1) Adelaide
- (United States) Brad Gilbert (3) Livingston, Cleveland, Tel Aviv
- (Ecuador) Andrés Gómez (1) Hong Kong
- (United States) Tom Gullikson (1) Newport
- (Sweden) Jan Gunnarsson (1) Vienna
- (Argentina) Martín Jaite (1) Buenos Aires
- (Sweden) Anders Järryd (1) Brussels
- (United States) Johan Kriek (1) Las Vegas
- (France) Henri Leconte (2) Nice, Sydney Outdoor
- (Czechoslovakia) Ivan Lendl (11) Fort Myers, Monte Carlo, Dallas, Forest Hills, Indianapolis, US Open, Stuttgart Outdoor, Sydney Indoor, Tokyo Indoor, Wembley, Masters
- (Sweden) Peter Lundgren (1) Cologne
- (New Zealand) Chris Lewis (1) Auckland
- (West Germany) Andreas Maurer (1) Madrid
- (United States) Tim Mayotte (1) Delray Beach
- (United States) John McEnroe (9) Masters, Philadelphia, Houston, Milan, Chicago, Atlanta, Stratton Mountain, Montreal, Stockholm
- (Czechoslovakia) Miloslav Mečíř (2) Rotterdam, Hamburg
- (France) Yannick Noah (3) Rome, Washington, D.C., Toulouse
- (Sweden) Joakim Nyström (2) Munich, Gstaad
- (West Germany) Ricki Osterthun (1) Hilversum
- (Italy) Claudio Panatta (1) Bari
- (Argentina) Horacio de la Peña (1) Marbella
- (Uruguay) Diego Pérez (1) Bordeaux
- (Czechoslovakia) Pavel Složil (1) Kitzbühel
- (Czechoslovakia) Tomáš Šmíd (1) Geneva
- (United States) Larry Stefanki (1) La Quinta
- (France) Thierry Tulasne (2) Bologna, Palermo
- (Sweden) Mats Wilander (3) Boston, French Open, Båstad
- (United States) Tim Wilkison (1) Nancy

The following players won their first title in 1985:

- (United States) Matt Anger Johannesburg
- (United States) Paul Annacone Brisbane
- (West Germany) Boris Becker Queen's Club
- (United States) Jonathan Canter Melbourne
- (Spain) Sergio Casal Florence
- (South Africa) Eddie Edwards Adelaide
- (United States) Tom Gullikson Newport
- (Sweden) Jan Gunnarsson Vienna
- (Argentina) Martín Jaite Buenos Aires
- (New Zealand) Chris Lewis Auckland
- (Sweden) Peter Lundgren Cologne
- (West Germany) Andreas Maurer Madrid
- (United States) Tim Mayotte Delray Beach
- (Czechoslovakia) Miloslav Mečíř Rotterdam
- (West Germany) Ricki Osterthun Hilversum
- (Italy) Claudio Panatta Bari
- (Argentina) Horacio de la Peña Marbella
- (Uruguay) Diego Pérez Bordeaux
- (United States) Larry Stefanki La Quinta
- (France) Thierry Tulasne Bologna

== See also ==
- 1985 Virginia Slims World Championship Series
