= 1985 Nabisco Grand Prix de Madrid =

- Date: 13–19 May
- Edition: 14th
- Category: Grand Prix
- Draw: 32S / 16D
- Prize money: $80,000
- Surface: Clay / outdoor
- Location: Madrid, Spain
- Venue: Club de Campo Villa de Madrid

Champions

Singles
- (West Germany) Andreas Maurer

Doubles
- (Brazil) Givaldo Barbosa / (Brazil) Ivan Kley
| ← 1984 · | Madrid Tennis Grand Prix | · 1986 → |

The 1985 Nabisco Grand Prix de Madrid was a men's tennis tournament played on outdoor clay courts at the Club de Campo Villa de Madrid in Madrid, Spain that was part of the 1985 Nabisco Grand Prix circuit. It was the 14th edition of the tournament and was played from 13 May until 19 May 1985. The tournament was downgraded from a Super Series to a Regular Series event due to the return of the Las Vegas tournament and subsequently the prize money was lowered from $200,000 to $80,000. Unseeded Andreas Maurer won the singles title.

== Finals ==
=== Singles ===
(West Germany) Andreas Maurer defeated (United States) Lawson Duncan 7–5, 6–2

- It was Maurer's only singles title of his career.

=== Doubles ===
(Brazil) Givaldo Barbosa / (Brazil) Ivan Kley defeated (Spain) Jorge Bardou / (Spain) Alberto Tous 7–6^{(8–6)}, 6–4

- It was Barbosa's only doubles title of the year and the 3rd and last of his career. It was Kley's only doubles title of his career.
