= 1985 Swedish Open =

- Date: 15–21 July
- Edition: 38th
- Category: Grand Prix
- Draw: 32S / 16D
- Prize money: $80,000
- Surface: Clay / outdoor
- Location: Båstad, Sweden

Champions

Singles
- (Sweden) Mats Wilander

Doubles
- (Sweden) Stefan Edberg / (Sweden) Anders Järryd
← 1984 ·	Swedish Open	· 1986 →

The 1985 Swedish Open was a men's tennis tournament played on outdoor clay courts held in Båstad, Sweden and was part of the Grand Prix circuit of the 1985 Tour. It was the 38th edition of the tournament and was held from 15 July 15 until 21 July 1985. First-seeded Mats Wilander won the singles title.

== Finals ==
=== Singles ===
(Sweden) Mats Wilander defeated (Sweden) Stefan Edberg 6–1, 6–0.

- It was Wilander's 3rd singles title of the year and the 19th of his career.

=== Doubles ===
(Sweden) Stefan Edberg / (Sweden) Anders Järryd defeated (Spain) Sergio Casal / (Spain) Emilio Sánchez 6–0, 7–6^{(7–2)}.
