= 1985 Benson & Hedges Championships =

- Date: 11–17 November
- Edition: 10th
- Draw: 32S / 16D
- Prize money: $300,000
- Surface: Carpet court / indoor
- Location: London, England
- Venue: Wembley Arena

Champions

Singles
- (Czechoslovakia) Ivan Lendl

Doubles
- (Sweden) Anders Järryd / (France) Guy Forget
- Wembley Championships

The 1985 Benson & Hedges Championships was a men's tennis tournament played on indoor carpet courts at the Wembley Arena in London in England that was part of the 1985 Nabisco Grand Prix. It was the 10th edition of the tournament and took place from 11 November until 17 November 1985. First-seeded Ivan Lendl won his second consecutive singles title at the event.

== Finals ==
=== Singles ===
(Czechoslovakia) Ivan Lendl defeated (West Germany) Boris Becker 6–7, 6–3, 4–6, 6–4, 6–4

- It was Lendl's 10th singles title of the year and the 52nd of his career.

=== Doubles ===
(France) Guy Forget / (Sweden) Anders Järryd defeated (West Germany) Boris Becker / (Socialist Federal Republic of Yugoslavia) Slobodan Živojinović 7–5, 4–6, 7–5
