= 1985 Alan King Tennis Classic – Doubles =

Doubles
- 1985 Alan King Tennis Classic

Final
- Champions: (Australia) Pat Cash (Australia) John Fitzgerald
- Runners-up: (United States) Paul Annacone (South Africa) Christo van Rensburg
- Score: 7–6, 6–7, 7–6

Details
- Draw: 16
- Seeds: 4

Events
Singles	Doubles
← 1983 ·	Alan King Tennis Classic

Steve Denton and Kevin Curren were the defending champions in 1983. Denton teamed up with Scott Davis and lost in the quarterfinals to Pat Cash and John Fitzgerald, while Curren teamed up with Vijay Amritraj and lost in the first round, also to Cash and Fitzgerald.

Cash and Fitzgerald won the title by defeating Paul Annacone and Christo van Rensburg 7–6, 6–7, 7–6 in the final.

== Seeds ==
1. (Sweden) Stefan Edberg / (Czechoslovakia) Tomáš Šmíd (first round)
2. (United States) Ken Flach / (United States) Robert Seguso (first round)
3. (Australia) Pat Cash / (Australia) John Fitzgerald (champions)
4. (United States) Paul Annacone / (South Africa) Christo van Rensburg (final)

== Draw ==
=== Key ===
- Q = Qualifier
- WC = Wild card
- LL = Lucky loser
- Alt = Alternate
- SE = Special exempt
- PR = Protected ranking
- ITF = ITF entry
- JE = Junior exempt
- w/o = Walkover
- r = Retired
- d = Defaulted
- SR = Special ranking

=== Draw ===
First round
1	(Sweden) S Edberg (Czechoslovakia) T Šmíd	6	4	4
(United States) S Meister (United States) E Teltscher	2	6	6
(Australia) M Fancutt (United States) B Teacher	2	4
(United States) J Kriek (United Kingdom) J Lloyd	6	6
3	(Australia) P Cash (Australia) J Fitzgerald	6	6
(India) V Amritraj (United States) K Curren	4	2
(United States) S Davis (United States) S Denton	6	6
(United States) T Delatte (Paraguay) F González	2	3
(United States) G Donnelly (United States) B Walts	7	2	1
(United States) M De Palmer (United States) S Giammalva Jr.	6	6	6
(Australia) D Graham (United States) M Leach	6	3	5
4	(United States) P Annacone (South Africa) C van Rensburg	3	6	7
(United States) H Pfister (United States) B Testerman	6	6	4
(West Germany) B Becker (United States) D Pate	7	3	6
(United States) B Gilbert (United States) V Van Patten	4	6	6
2	(United States) K Flach (United States) R Seguso	6	4	4

Quarterfinals
(United States) S Meister (United States) E Teltscher	2	4
(United States) J Kriek (United Kingdom) J Lloyd	6	6
3	(Australia) P Cash (Australia) J Fitzgerald	6	6	6
(United States) S Davis (United States) S Denton	1	7	1
(United States) M De Palmer (United States) S Giammalva Jr.	3	6
4	(United States) P Annacone (South Africa) C van Rensburg	6	7
(West Germany) B Becker (United States) D Pate	4	6	6
(United States) B Gilbert (United States) V Van Patten	6	2	7

Semifinals
(United States) J Kriek (United Kingdom) J Lloyd	6	6	4
3	(Australia) P Cash (Australia) J Fitzgerald	2	7	6
4	(United States) P Annacone (South Africa) C van Rensburg	6	6
(United States) B Gilbert (United States) V Van Patten	2	4

Final
3	(Australia) P Cash (Australia) J Fitzgerald	7	6	7
4	(United States) P Annacone (South Africa) C van Rensburg	6	7	6
