= 1985 Torneo Internazionale Roger et Gallet =

- Date: 20–26 May
- Edition: 13th
- Category: Grand Prix
- Draw: 32S / 16D
- Prize money: $80,000
- Surface: Clay / outdoor
- Location: Florence, Italy

Champions

Singles
- (Spain) Sergio Casal

Doubles
- (Australia) David Graham / (Australia) Laurie Warder
- ATP Florence

The 1985 Torneo Internazionale Roger et Gallet was a men's tennis tournament played on outdoor clay courts in Florence, Italy that was part of the 1985 Nabisco Grand Prix circuit. It was the 13th edition of the tournament and was played from 20 May until 26 May 1985. Unseeded Sergio Casal, who entered the competition as a qualifier, won the singles title.

== Finals ==
=== Singles ===
(Spain) Sergio Casal defeated (United States) Jimmy Arias 3–6, 6–3, 6–2

- It was Casal's only singles title of his career.

=== Doubles ===
(Australia) David Graham / (Australia) Laurie Warder defeated (Australia) Bruce Derlin / (Australia) Carl Limberger 6–1, 6–1

- It was Graham's only doubles title of the year and the 2nd and last of his career. It was Warder's only doubles title of the year and the 2nd of his career.
