= 1985 Paine Webber Classic =

- Date: March 25 – April 1
- Edition: 1st
- Category: Grand Prix
- Draw: 32S / 16D
- Prize money: $250,000
- Surface: Hard / outdoor
- Location: Fort Myers, FL, United States

Champions

Singles
- (Czechoslovakia) Ivan Lendl

Doubles
- (United States) Ken Flach / (United States) Robert Seguso
- Paine Webber Classic

The 1985 Paine Webber Classic was a men's tennis tournament played on outdoor hard courts in Fort Myers, Florida in the United States that was part of the 1985 Nabisco Grand Prix. It was the inaugural edition of the tournament and was held from March 25 through April 1, 1985. Second-seeded Ivan Lendl won the singles title.

== Prize money ==
Event	W	F	SF	QF	Round of 16	Round of 32
Singles	$50,000	$25,000	$13,250	$7,125	$3,875	$2,125
Doubles	$15,000	$7,500	$4,150	$2,600	$1,725	—N/a
Doubles prize money per team

== Finals ==
=== Singles ===
(Czechoslovakia) Ivan Lendl defeated (United States) Jimmy Connors 6–3, 6–2

- It was Lendl's 1st singles title of the year and the 43rd of his career.

=== Doubles ===
(United States) Ken Flach / (United States) Robert Seguso defeated (United States) Sammy Giammalva Jr. / (United States) David Pate 3–6, 6–3, 6–3

- It was Flach's 2nd title of the year and the 8th of his career. It was Seguso's 2nd title of the year and the 8th of his career.

== See also ==
- Connors–Lendl rivalry
