= 1985 Volvo Tennis Chicago =

- Date: April 1–7
- Edition: 1st
- Category: Grand Prix circuit
- Draw: 32S / 16D
- Prize money: $250,000
- Surface: Carpet / indoor
- Location: Chicago, Illinois, US
- Venue: UIC Pavilion

Champions

Singles
- (United States) John McEnroe

Doubles
- (United States) Johan Kriek / (France) Yannick Noah
Chicago Grand Prix	· 1986 →

The 1985 Volvo Tennis Chicago was a men's tennis tournament played on indoor carpet courts at the UIC Pavilion in Chicago, Illinois in the United States that was part of the 1985 Nabisco Grand Prix. It was the inaugural edition of the tournament and was held from April 1 through April 7, 1985. First-seeded John McEnroe, who entered on a wildcard, won the singles title after his opponent in the final, second-seed Jimmy Connors, withdrew due to a back injury.

== Finals ==
=== Singles ===
(United States) John McEnroe defeated (United States) Jimmy Connors walkover

- It was McEnroe's 5th singles title of the year and the 63rd of his career

=== Doubles ===
(United States) Johan Kriek / (France) Yannick Noah defeated (United States) Ken Flach / (United States) Robert Seguso 3–6, 4–6, 7–5, 6–1, 6–4

== See also ==
- Connors–McEnroe rivalry
