= 1985 Milan Indoor =

Tennis tournament

- Date: 25–31 March
- Edition: 8th
- Category: Grand Prix
- Draw: 32S / 16D
- Prize money: $300,000
- Surface: Carpet / indoor
- Location: Milan, Italy
- Venue: PalaLido

Champions

Singles
- (United States) John McEnroe

Doubles
- (Switzerland) Heinz Günthardt / (Sweden) Anders Järryd
- Milan Indoor

The 1985 Milan Indoor (also known as the Fila Trophy for sponsorship reasons) was a men's tennis tournament played on indoor carpet courts in Milan, Italy. The event was moved to the PalaLido after heavy snowfall had collapsed the roof of the Palazzo dello Sport in January 1985 and caused its closure. The event was part of the 1985 Nabisco Grand Prix. It was the eighth edition of the tournament and was played from 23 March until 31 March 1985. First-seeded John McEnroe won the singles title, his fourth at the event after 1979–1981.

== Finals ==
=== Singles ===
(United States) John McEnroe defeated (Sweden) Anders Järryd 6–4, 6–1

- It was McEnroe's 3rd singles title of the year and the 62nd of his career.

=== Doubles ===
(Switzerland) Heinz Günthardt / (Sweden) Anders Järryd defeated (Australia) Broderick Dyke / (Australia) Wally Masur 6–2, 6–1

== Prize money ==
Event	W	F	SF	QF	Round of 16	Round of 32
Singles	$60,000	$30,000	$15,900	$8,550	$4,650	$2,550
Doubles*	$18,000	$9,000	$4,980	$3,120	$2,070	—N/a

_{*per team}
