= 1985 Swiss Indoors =

- Date: 14–20 October
- Edition: 16th
- Category: Grand Prix
- Draw: 32S / 16D
- Prize money: $150,000
- Surface: Hard / indoor
- Location: Basel, Switzerland
- Venue: St. Jakobshalle

Champions

Singles
- (Sweden) Stefan Edberg

Doubles
- (United States) Tim Gullikson / (United States) Tom Gullikson
← 1984 ·	Swiss Indoors	· 1986 →

The 1985 Swiss Indoors was a men's tennis tournament played on indoor hard courts at the St. Jakobshalle in Basel, Switzerland that was part of the 1985 Nabisco Grand Prix. It was the 16th edition of the tournament and was held from 14 October through 21 October 1985. Second-seeded Stefan Edberg won the singles title.

== Finals ==
=== Singles ===
(Sweden) Stefan Edberg defeated (France) Yannick Noah 6–7, 6–4, 7–6, 6–1

- It was Edberg's 3rd singles title of the year and the 4th of his career.

=== Doubles ===
(United States) Tim Gullikson / (United States) Tom Gullikson defeated (United States) Mark Dickson / (United States) Tim Wilkison 4–6, 6–4, 6–4
