= 1985 Stockholm Open =

- Date: 4–10 November
- Edition: 17th
- Category: Grand Prix circuit
- Draw: 32S / 16D
- Prize money: $300,000
- Surface: Hard / indoor
- Location: Stockholm, Sweden
- Venue: Kungliga tennishallen

Champions

Singles
- (United States) John McEnroe

Doubles
- (France) Guy Forget / (Ecuador) Andrés Gómez
- Stockholm Open

The 1985 Stockholm Open was a men'sNabisco Grand Prix tennis tournament played on hard courts.It took place at the Kungliga tennishallen in Stockholm, Sweden. It was the 17th edition of the tournament and was held from 4 November through 10 November 1985. First-seeded John McEnroe won the singles title.

== Finals ==
=== Singles ===
(United States) John McEnroe defeated (Sweden) Anders Järryd, 6–1, 6–2

- It was McEnroe's 8th singles title of the year and the 67th of his career.

=== Doubles ===
(France) Guy Forget / (Ecuador) Andrés Gómez defeated (United States) Mike De Palmer / (United States) Gary Donnelly, 6–3, 6–4
