= 1985 Fischer-Grand Prix =

- Date: 18–25 November
- Edition: 11th
- Category: Grand Prix
- Draw: 32S / 16D
- Prize money: $100,000
- Surface: Hard / indoor
- Location: Vienna, Austria
- Venue: Wiener Stadthalle

Champions

Singles
- (Sweden) Jan Gunnarsson

Doubles
- (United States) Mike De Palmer / (United States) Gary Donnelly
- Vienna Open

The 1985 Fischer-Grand Prix was a men's tennis tournament played on indoor hard courts at the Wiener Stadthalle in Vienna in Austria that was part of the 1985 Nabisco Grand Prix. It was the tenth edition of the tournament and took place from 18 November until 25 November 1985. Jan Gunnarsson won the singles title.

== Finals ==
=== Singles ===
(Sweden) Jan Gunnarsson defeated (Czechoslovakia) Libor Pimek 6–7, 6–2, 6–4, 1–6, 7–5

- It was Gunnarsson's only title of the year and the 6th of his career.

=== Doubles ===
(United States) Mike De Palmer / (United States) Gary Donnelly defeated (Spain) Sergio Casal / (Spain) Emilio Sánchez 6–4, 6–3

- It was de Palmer's 2nd title of the year and the 2nd of his career. It was Donnelly's only title of the year and the 2nd of his career.
