= 1985 Fischer-Grand Prix – Doubles =

Doubles
- 1985 Fischer-Grand Prix

Final
- Champions: (United States) Mike De Palmer (United States) Gary Donnelly
- Runners-up: (Spain) Sergio Casal (Spain) Emilio Sánchez
- Score: 6–4, 6–3

Details
- Draw: 16
- Seeds: 4

Events
Singles	Doubles
← 1984 ·	Vienna Open	· 1986 →

Wojciech Fibak and Sandy Mayer were the defending champions but did not compete that year.

Mike De Palmer and Gary Donnelly won in the final 6–4, 6–3 against Sergio Casal and Emilio Sánchez.

== Seeds ==
1. (Switzerland) Heinz Günthardt / (Hungary) Balázs Taróczy (quarterfinals)
2. (Sweden) Anders Järryd / (Czechoslovakia) Pavel Složil (quarterfinals)
3. (Spain) Sergio Casal / (Spain) Emilio Sánchez (final)
4. (United States) Mike De Palmer / (United States) Gary Donnelly (champions)

== Draw ==
=== Key ===
- Q = Qualifier
- WC = Wild card
- LL = Lucky loser
- Alt = Alternate
- SE = Special exempt
- PR = Protected ranking
- ITF = ITF entry
- JE = Junior exempt
- w/o = Walkover
- r = Retired
- d = Defaulted
- SR = Special ranking

First round
1	(Switzerland) H Günthardt (Hungary) B Taróczy	7	7
(Romania) F Segărceanu (United Kingdom) J Smith	5	6
(Haiti) R Agénor (Austria) T Muster	5	6	7
(Sweden) S Simonsson (West Germany) M Westphal	7	4	6
4	(United States) M De Palmer (United States) G Donnelly	6	6
(Italy) A de Minicis (Finland) L Palin	3	4
(Austria) A Antonitsch (Czechoslovakia) J Navrátil	6	7
(Spain) G Urpí (Czechoslovakia) M Vajda	3	5
(France) T Benhabiles (Switzerland) J Srnensky	7	6	4
(Czechoslovakia) S Birner (Switzerland) M Günthardt	5	7	6
(Sweden) R Båthman (Sweden) S Eriksson	4	2
3	(Spain) S Casal (Spain) E Sánchez	6	6
(Socialist Federal Republic of Yugoslavia) M Ostoja (Socialist Federal Republic of Yugoslavia) G Prpić	2	4
(Sweden) P Hjertquist (Sweden) P Svensson	6	6
(Sweden) J Gunnarsson (West Germany) A Maurer	6	4	3
2	(Sweden) A Järryd (Czechoslovakia) P Složil	2	6	6

Quarterfinals
1	(Switzerland) H Günthardt (Hungary) B Taróczy	7	4	4
(Haiti) R Agénor (Austria) T Muster	6	6	6
4	(United States) M De Palmer (United States) G Donnelly	7	7
(Austria) A Antonitsch (Czechoslovakia) J Navrátil	6	6
(Czechoslovakia) S Birner (Switzerland) M Günthardt	2	5
3	(Spain) S Casal (Spain) E Sánchez	6	7
(Sweden) P Hjertquist (Sweden) P Svensson	w/o
2	(Sweden) A Järryd (Czechoslovakia) P Složil

Semifinals
(Haiti) R Agénor (Austria) T Muster	6	2
4	(United States) M De Palmer (United States) G Donnelly	7	6
3	(Spain) S Casal (Spain) E Sánchez	4	7	6
(Sweden) P Hjertquist (Sweden) P Svensson	6	5	1

Final
4	(United States) M De Palmer (United States) G Donnelly	6	6
3	(Spain) S Casal (Spain) E Sánchez	4	3
