= 1985 Benson & Hedges Championships – Doubles =

Doubles
- 1985 Benson & Hedges Championships

Final
- Champions: (France) Guy Forget (Sweden) Anders Järryd
- Runners-up: (West Germany) Boris Becker (Socialist Federal Republic of Yugoslavia) Slobodan Živojinović
- Score: 7–5, 4–6, 7–5

Details
- Draw: 16
- Seeds: 4

Events
Singles	Doubles
- Wembley Championships

Andrés Gómez and Ivan Lendl were the defending champions, but lost in the semifinals to Guy Forget and Anders Järryd.

Forget and Jarryd won the title by defeating Boris Becker and Slobodan Živojinović 7–5, 4–6, 7–5 in the final.

== Seeds ==
1. (Switzerland) Heinz Günthardt / (Hungary) Balázs Taróczy (quarterfinals)
2. (United States) Peter Fleming / (South Africa) Christo van Rensburg (semifinals)
3. (United States) Scott Davis / (United States) David Pate (first round)
4. (Ecuador) Andrés Gómez / (United States) Ivan Lendl (semifinals)

== Draw ==
Key

- Q = Qualifier
- WC = Wild card
- LL = Lucky loser
- Alt = Alternate
- ITF = ITF entry
- PR = Protected ranking
- SR = Special ranking
- SE = Special exempt
- JE = Junior exempt
- JR = Junior Accelerator Programme entrant
- CO = College Accelerator Programme entrant
- NG = Next Gen Accelerator Program entrant
- w/o = Walkover
- r = Retired
- d = Defaulted

=== Draw ===
First round
1	(Switzerland) H Gunthardt (Hungary) B Taroczy	6	6
WC	(United Kingdom) J Bates (United Kingdom) N Fulwood	1	2
(France) G Forget (Sweden) A Järryd	4	7	6
(United States) S Denton (United States) S Stewart	6	6	4
4	(Ecuador) A Gómez (Czechoslovakia) I Lendl	6	6	7
(Czechoslovakia) L Pimek (Czechoslovakia) T Smid	4	7	5
(United States) J Kriek (United Kingdom) J Lloyd	2	6	5
(Spain) S Casal (Spain) E Sánchez	6	2	7
(Germany) B Becker (Socialist Federal Republic of Yugoslavia) S Živojinović	6	6
(Sweden) J Gunnarsson (Denmark) M Mortensen	0	1
(United States) M De Palmer (United States) G Donnelly	4	6	6
3	(United States) S Davis (United States) D Pate	6	3	4
(United States) M Leach (United States) T Wilkison	7	6
LL	(Switzerland) M Günthardt (West Germany) A Maurer	6	3
(Israel) S Glickstein (Israel) S Perkiss	3	2
2	(United States) P Fleming (South Africa) C van Rensburg	6	6

Quarterfinals
1	(Switzerland) H Gunthardt (Hungary) B Taroczy	6	2	1
(France) G Forget (Sweden) A Järryd	4	6	6
4	(Ecuador) A Gómez (Czechoslovakia) I Lendl	7	6
(Spain) S Casal (Spain) E Sánchez	6	4
(Germany) B Becker (Socialist Federal Republic of Yugoslavia) S Živojinović	3	6	6
(United States) M De Palmer (United States) G Donnelly	6	3	2
(United States) M Leach (United States) T Wilkison	7	6	7
2	(United States) P Fleming (South Africa) C van Rensburg	5	7	9

Semifinals
(France) G Forget (Sweden) A Järryd	6	6
4	(Ecuador) A Gómez (Czechoslovakia) I Lendl	2	3
(Germany) B Becker (Socialist Federal Republic of Yugoslavia) S Živojinović	6	6
2	(United States) P Fleming (South Africa) C van Rensburg	3	4

Final
(France) G Forget (Sweden) A Järryd	7	4	6
(Germany) B Becker (Socialist Federal Republic of Yugoslavia) S Živojinović	5	6	4
