= 1985 Benson & Hedges Championships – Singles =

Singles
- 1985 Benson & Hedges Championships

Final
- Champion: (Czechoslovakia) Ivan Lendl
- Runner-up: (West Germany) Boris Becker
- Score: 6–7, 6–3, 4–6, 6–4, 6–4

Details
- Draw: 32
- Seeds: 8

Events
Singles	Doubles
- Wembley Championships

Ivan Lendl successfully defended his title, by defeating Boris Becker 6–7, 6–3, 4–6, 6–4, 6–4 in the final.

== Seeds ==
1. (Czechoslovakia) Ivan Lendl (champion)
2. (Germany) Boris Becker (final)
3. (Sweden) Stefan Edberg (second round)
4. (France) Yannick Noah (first round, retired)
5. (Sweden) Anders Järryd (semifinals)
6. (United States) Johan Kriek (quarterfinals)
7. (United States) Scott Davis (first round)
8. (Sweden) Joakim Nyström (quarterfinals)

== Draw ==
Key

- Q = Qualifier
- WC = Wild card
- LL = Lucky loser
- Alt = Alternate
- ITF = ITF entry
- PR = Protected ranking
- SR = Special ranking
- SE = Special exempt
- JE = Junior exempt
- JR = Junior Accelerator Programme entrant
- CO = College Accelerator Programme entrant
- NG = Next Gen Accelerator Program entrant
- w/o = Walkover
- r = Retired
- d = Defaulted

=== Finals ===
Semifinals
1	(Czechoslovakia) Ivan Lendl	6	6	6
(United States) David Pate	4	7	3
5	(Sweden) Anders Järryd	6	6
2	(Germany) Boris Becker	7	7

Final
1	(Czechoslovakia) Ivan Lendl	6	6	4	6	6
2	(Germany) Boris Becker	7	3	6	4	4

=== Top half ===
First round
1	(Czechoslovakia) I Lendl	3	6	6
(United States) L Stefanki	6	2	0
(Czechoslovakia) T Smid	7	7
LL	(United States) M Davis	5	5
(Ecuador) A Gómez	4	2
Q	(United States) T Nelson	6	6
Q	(Czechoslovakia) L Pimek	4	2^{r}
6	(United States) J Kriek	6	5
3	(Sweden) S Edberg	6	7
(France) T Tulasne	3	6
(West Germany) A Maurer	6	4
(United States) D Pate	7	6
WC	(Socialist Federal Republic of Yugoslavia) S Živojinović	3	4
(France) G Forget	6	6
(Spain) S Casal	1	0
8	(Sweden) J Nyström	6	6

Second round
1	(Czechoslovakia) I Lendl	6	6
(Czechoslovakia) T Smid	2	0
Q	(United States) T Nelson	2	2
6	(United States) J Kriek	6	6
3	(Sweden) S Edberg	7	4	5
(United States) D Pate	6	6	7
(France) G Forget	4	3
8	(Sweden) J Nyström	6	6

Quarterfinals
1	(Czechoslovakia) I Lendl	6	6
6	(United States) J Kriek	2	1
(United States) D Pate	6	3	7
8	(Sweden) J Nyström	2	6	5

Semifinals
1	(Czechoslovakia) I Lendl	6	6	6
(United States) D Pate	4	7	3

=== Bottom half ===
First round
5	(Sweden) A Järryd	6	6
(Switzerland) H Gunthardt	3	3
Q	(Hungary) B Taroczy	6	6
(Argentina) M Jaite	2	0
(India) R Krishnan	4	6	6
(United States) T Wilkison	6	4	4
(United States) J Sadri	4
4	(France) Y Noah	1^{r}
7	(United States) S Davis	0	7	1
(United States) M Leach	6	5	6
WC	(United Kingdom) J Lloyd	3	3
(Sweden) J Gunnarsson	6	6
(United States) B Testerman	4	4
WC	(United Kingdom) J Bates	6	6
Q	(Israel) S Glickstein	2	5
2	(Germany) B Becker	6	7

Second round
5	(Sweden) A Järryd	6	7
Q	(Hungary) B Taroczy	4	5
(India) R Krishnan	6	3	6
(United States) J Sadri	4	6	4
(United States) M Leach	7	6
(Sweden) J Gunnarsson	5	3
WC	(United Kingdom) J Bates	5	6
2	(Germany) B Becker	7	7

Quarterfinals
5	(Sweden) A Järryd	6	7
(India) R Krishnan	1	5
(United States) M Leach	4	3^{r}
2	(Germany) B Becker	6	5

Semifinals
5	(Sweden) A Järryd	6	6
2	(Germany) B Becker	7	7
