= 1985 Milan Indoor – Singles =

Singles
- 1985 Milan Indoor

Final
- Champion: (United States) John McEnroe
- Runner-up: (Sweden) Anders Järryd
- Score: 6–4, 6–1

Details
- Draw: 32
- Seeds: 8

Events
Singles	Doubles
- Milan Indoor

Stefan Edberg was the defending champion, but did not participate this year.

John McEnroe won the tournament, beating Anders Järryd in the final, 6–4, 6–1.

== Seeds ==
1. (United States) John McEnroe (champion)
2. (Sweden) Anders Järryd (final)
3. (Australia) Pat Cash (first round)
4. (United States) Vitas Gerulaitis (quarterfinals)
5. (Czechoslovakia) Tomáš Šmíd (semifinals)
6. (Czechoslovakia) Miloslav Mečíř (first round)
7. (United States) John Sadri (quarterfinals)
8. (Switzerland) Heinz Günthardt (second round)

== Draw ==
Key

- Q = Qualifier
- WC = Wild card
- LL = Lucky loser
- Alt = Alternate
- ITF = ITF entry
- PR = Protected ranking
- SR = Special ranking
- SE = Special exempt
- JE = Junior exempt
- JR = Junior Accelerator Programme entrant
- CO = College Accelerator Programme entrant
- NG = Next Gen Accelerator Program entrant
- w/o = Walkover
- r = Retired
- d = Defaulted

=== Finals ===
Semifinals
1	(United States) John McEnroe	6	6
(Switzerland) Jakob Hlasek	3	2
5	(Czechoslovakia) Tomáš Šmíd	3	6
2	(Sweden) Anders Järryd	6	7

Final
1	(United States) John McEnroe	6	6
2	(Sweden) Anders Järryd	4	1

=== Top half ===
First round
1	(United States) J McEnroe	6	6
(West Germany) B Becker	4	3
Q	(Israel) A Mansdorf	7	6
(United States) C Hooper	6	3
(France) H Leconte	6	6	7
Q	(United States) L Bourne	2	7	5
(New Zealand) C Lewis	3	3
8	(Switzerland) H Günthardt	6	6
3	(Australia) P Cash	6	5	4
WC	(Italy) G Ocleppo	1	7	6
Q	(Sweden) T Högstedt	2	6
(Switzerland) J Hlasek	6	7
(Australia) P McNamee	6	7
(Hungary) Z Kuharszky	1	6
(United States) T Wilkison	7	7
6	(Czechoslovakia) M Mečíř	6	6

Second round
1	(United States) J McEnroe	6	6
Q	(Israel) A Mansdorf	1	4
(France) H Leconte	6	6
8	(Switzerland) H Günthardt	1	0
WC	(Italy) G Ocleppo	6	4
(Switzerland) J Hlasek	7	6
(Australia) P McNamee	0	6	0
(United States) T Wilkison	6	3	6

Quarterfinals
1	(United States) J McEnroe	6	6
(France) H Leconte	3	4
(Switzerland) J Hlasek	7	4	6
(United States) T Wilkison	6	6	4

Semifinals
1	(United States) J McEnroe	6	6
(Switzerland) J Hlasek	3	2

=== Bottom half ===
First round
5	(Czechoslovakia) T Šmíd	6	7
WC	(Italy) C Panatta	3	5
Q	(United Kingdom) S Bale	3	5
(Australia) J Frawley	6	4^{r}
(Israel) S Perkiss	6	2	6
(Australia) W Masur	3	6	7
(South Africa) D Visser	2	7	4
4	(United States) V Gerulaitis	6	6	6
7	(United States) J Sadri	7	6	6
(United States) B Green	5	7	3
(United States) M Mitchell	6	1
(Czechoslovakia) P Složil	7	6
(United States) S Meister	4	4
(India) V Amritraj	6	6
WC	(Italy) S Colombo	3	4
2	(Sweden) A Järryd	6	6

Second round
5	(Czechoslovakia) T Šmíd	6	5	6
Q	(United Kingdom) S Bale	4	7	4
(Australia) W Masur	6	3
4	(United States) V Gerulaitis	7	6
7	(United States) J Sadri	6	6
(Czechoslovakia) P Složil	3	4
(India) V Amritraj	3	4
2	(Sweden) A Järryd	6	6

Quarterfinals
5	(Czechoslovakia) T Šmíd	6	7
4	(United States) V Gerulaitis	3	6
7	(United States) J Sadri	2	4
2	(Sweden) A Järryd	6	6

Semifinals
5	(Czechoslovakia) T Šmíd	3	6
2	(Sweden) A Järryd	6	7
