= 1983 Alan King Tennis Classic =

- Date: April 18–24
- Edition: 12th
- Category: Grand Prix circuit
- Draw: 32S / 16D
- Prize money: $312,500
- Surface: Hard / outdoor
- Location: Las Vegas, United States
- Venue: Caesars Palace

Champions

Singles
- (United States) Jimmy Connors

Doubles
- (United States) Steve Denton / (South Africa) Kevin Curren
← 1982 ·	Alan King Tennis Classic	· 1985 →

The 1983 Alan King Tennis Classic, also known as the Alan King-Caesars Palace Tennis Classic, was a men's tennis tournament played on outdoor hard courts at the Caesars Palace in Las Vegas, United States. It was the 12th edition of the event and was part of the 1983 Volvo Grand Prix circuit. The tournament was held from April 18 through April 24, 1983. First-seeded Jimmy Connors won the singles title and the accompanying $62,500 first-prize money. It was Connors' second consecutive singles title at the tournament and the fourth in total.

== Finals ==
=== Singles ===
(United States) Jimmy Connors defeated (Australia) Mark Edmondson 7–6^{(7–4)}, 6–1

- It was Connors' 2nd singles title of the year and the 98th of his career.

=== Doubles ===
(United States) Steve Denton / (South Africa) Kevin Curren defeated (United States) Tracy Delatte / (United States) Johan Kriek 6–3, 7–5
