= 1985 Swedish Open – Singles =

Singles
- 1985 Swedish Open

Final
- Champion: (Sweden) Mats Wilander
- Runner-up: (Sweden) Stefan Edberg
- Score: 6–1, 6–0

Details
- Draw: 32
- Seeds: 8

Events
| Singles | Doubles |
- Swedish Open

Henrik Sundström was the defending champion, but lost in the quarterfinals to Damir Keretić.

Mats Wilander won the title by defeating Stefan Edberg 6–1, 6–0 in the final.

== Seeds ==
1. (Sweden) Mats Wilander (champion)
2. (Sweden) Anders Järryd (first round)
3. (Sweden) Stefan Edberg (final)
4. (Sweden) Henrik Sundström (quarterfinals)
5. (Spain) Sergio Casal (second round)
6. (Sweden) Jonas Svensson (second round)
7. (France) Trevor Allan (first round)
8. (West Germany) Damir Keretić (semifinals)

== Draw ==
Key

- Q = Qualifier
- WC = Wild card
- LL = Lucky loser
- Alt = Alternate
- ITF = ITF entry
- PR = Protected ranking
- SR = Special ranking
- SE = Special exempt
- JE = Junior exempt
- JR = Junior Accelerator Programme entrant
- CO = College Accelerator Programme entrant
- NG = Next Gen Accelerator Program entrant
- w/o = Walkover
- r = Retired
- d = Defaulted

=== Finals ===
Semifinals
1 | (Sweden) Mats Wilander | 6 | 4 | 6
8 | (West Germany) Damir Keretić | 3 | 6 | 4
3 | (Sweden) Stefan Edberg | 6 | 6
(Sweden) Kent Carlsson | 4 | 2

Final
1 | (Sweden) Mats Wilander | 6 | 6
3 | (Sweden) Stefan Edberg | 1 | 0

=== Top half ===
First round
1 | (Sweden) M Wilander | 6 | 3 | 6
WC | (Sweden) H Simonsson | 1 | 6 | 1
WC | (Sweden) M Tideman | 3 | 7 | 7
Q | (Sweden) D Engel | 6 | 6 | 5
Q | (Socialist Federal Republic of Yugoslavia) G Prpić | 2 | 6 | 7
(Socialist Federal Republic of Yugoslavia) M Ostoja | 6 | 0 | 5
(Republic of Ireland) M Doyle | 3 | 3
6 | (Sweden) J Svensson | 6 | 6
4 | (Sweden) H Sundström | 6 | 6
(West Germany) R Osterthun | 1 | 1
LL | (Sweden) P Carlsson | 6 | 1 | 5
Q | (Australia) D Cahill | 2 | 6 | 7
(Brazil) F Roese | 1 | 6 | 6
(Brazil) I Kley | 6 | 3 | 7
(Australia) B Drewett | 7 | 5 | 3
8 | (West Germany) D Keretić | 6 | 7 | 6

Second round
1 | (Sweden) M Wilander | 6 | 4 | 6
WC | (Sweden) M Tideman | 3 | 6 | 0
Q | (Socialist Federal Republic of Yugoslavia) G Prpić | 6 | 6
6 | (Sweden) J Svensson | 3 | 3
4 | (Sweden) H Sundström | 6 | 6
Q | (Australia) D Cahill | 2 | 2
(Brazil) I Kley | 5 | 1
8 | (West Germany) D Keretić | 7 | 6

Quarterfinals
1 | (Sweden) M Wilander | 6 | 0 | 6
Q | (Socialist Federal Republic of Yugoslavia) G Prpić | 1 | 6 | 2
4 | (Sweden) H Sundström | 3 | 3
8 | (West Germany) D Keretić | 6 | 6

Semifinals
1 | (Sweden) M Wilander | 6 | 4 | 6
8 | (West Germany) D Keretić | 3 | 6 | 4

=== Bottom half ===
First round
7 | (France) T Allan | 3 | 4
Q | (Australia) S Youl | 6 | 6
(Ecuador) R Viver | 2 | 5
(Sweden) S Simonsson | 6 | 7
(Austria) B Pils | 2 | 5
(Romania) F Segărceanu | 6 | 7
(Brazil) G Barbosa | 3 | 1
3 | (Sweden) S Edberg | 6 | 6
5 | (Spain) S Casal | 5 | 6 | 6
(West Germany) P Elter | 7 | 2 | 3
(Sweden) K Carlsson | 7 | 6
(Switzerland) C Mezzadri | 6 | 1
(Argentina) G Rivas | 1 | 6
(Italy) A de Minicis | 6 | 7
(Spain) E Sánchez | 4 | 6 | 6
2 | (Sweden) A Järryd | 6 | 1 | 2

Second round
Q | (Australia) S Youl | 6 | 4
(Sweden) S Simonsson | 7 | 6
(Romania) F Segărceanu | 2 | 0
3 | (Sweden) S Edberg | 6 | 6
5 | (Spain) S Casal | 4 | 2
(Sweden) K Carlsson | 6 | 6
(Italy) A de Minicis | 6 | 7
(Spain) E Sánchez | 4 | 6

Quarterfinals
(Sweden) S Simonsson | 0 | 4
3 | (Sweden) S Edberg | 6 | 6
(Sweden) K Carlsson | 6 | 6
(Italy) A de Minicis | 0 | 4

Semifinals
3 | (Sweden) S Edberg | 6 | 6
(Sweden) K Carlsson | 4 | 2
