= 1985 Paine Webber Classic – Doubles =

Doubles
- 1985 Paine Webber Classic

Final
- Champions: (United States) Ken Flach (United States) Robert Seguso
- Runners-up: (United States) Sammy Giammalva Jr. (United States) David Pate
- Score: 3–6, 6–3, 6–3

Details
- Draw: 16
- Seeds: 4

Events
Singles	Doubles
Paine Webber Classic	· 1986 →

Ken Flach and Robert Seguso won the final 3–6, 6–3, 6–3 against Sammy Giammalva Jr. and David Pate.

== Seeds ==
1. (United States) Ken Flach / (United States) Robert Seguso (champions)
2. (United States) Paul Annacone / (South Africa) Christo van Rensburg (semifinals)
3. (Australia) John Alexander / (Australia) John Fitzgerald (quarterfinals)
4. (Australia) Peter Doohan / (Australia) Michael Fancutt (first round)

== Draw ==
=== Key ===
- Q = Qualifier
- WC = Wild card
- LL = Lucky loser
- Alt = Alternate
- SE = Special exempt
- PR = Protected ranking
- ITF = ITF entry
- JE = Junior exempt
- w/o = Walkover
- r = Retired
- d = Defaulted
- SR = Special ranking

First round
1	(United States) K Flach (United States) R Seguso	6	4	6
(United States) M Davis (United States) C Dunk	4	6	3
(Puerto Rico) E Fernandez (Paraguay) F González	6	6	4
(United States) S Davis (United States) J Kriek	1	7	6
4	(Australia) P Doohan (Australia) M Fancutt	7	2	4
(Chile) R Acuña (United States) L Stefanki	6	6	6
(Ecuador) A Gómez (Czechoslovakia) I Lendl	6	6
(United States) G Holmes (United States) A Krickstein	2	2
(United States) S Giammalva Jr. (United States) D Pate	6	4	6
(United States) G Donnelly (United States) B Walts	2	6	4
(United States) T Delatte (United States) E Teltscher	5	6
3	(Australia) J Alexander (Australia) J Fitzgerald	7	7
(United States) B Gilbert (France) Y Noah	3	6	6
(United States) D Gitlin (United Kingdom) J Lloyd	6	3	7
(United States) H Pfister (United States) B Testerman	3	6
2	(United States) P Annacone (South Africa) C van Rensburg	6	7

Quarterfinals
1	(United States) K Flach (United States) R Seguso	6	6
(United States) S Davis (United States) J Kriek	0	1
(Chile) R Acuña (United States) L Stefanki	6	3
(Ecuador) A Gómez (Czechoslovakia) I Lendl	7	6
(United States) S Giammalva Jr. (United States) D Pate	6	6
3	(Australia) J Alexander (Australia) J Fitzgerald	3	2
(United States) D Gitlin (United Kingdom) J Lloyd	3	6	3
2	(United States) P Annacone (South Africa) C van Rensburg	6	3	6

Semifinals
1	(United States) K Flach (United States) R Seguso	7	6
(Ecuador) A Gómez (Czechoslovakia) I Lendl	6	4
(United States) S Giammalva Jr. (United States) D Pate	6	6
2	(United States) P Annacone (South Africa) C van Rensburg	3	3

Final
1	(United States) K Flach (United States) R Seguso	3	6	6
(United States) S Giammalva Jr. (United States) D Pate	6	3	3
