= 1985 Alan King Tennis Classic – Singles =

Singles
- 1985 Alan King Tennis Classic

Final
- Champion: (United States) Johan Kriek
- Runner-up: (United States) Jimmy Arias
- Score: 4–6, 6–4, 6–3, 6–2

Details
- Draw: 32 (3WC/4Q)
- Seeds: 8

Events
Singles	Doubles
- Alan King Tennis Classic

Jimmy Connors was the defending champion in 1983. He lost in the first round to Vijay Amritraj.

Unseeded Johan Kriek won the title by defeating Jimmy Arias 4–6, 6–4, 6–3, 6–2 in the final.

== Seeds ==
1. (United States) Jimmy Connors (first round)
2. (United States) Kevin Curren (first round)
3. (United States) Aaron Krickstein (first round)
4. (Australia) Pat Cash (first round)
5. (United States) Eliot Teltscher (quarterfinals)
6. (Czechoslovakia) Tomáš Šmíd (semifinals)
7. (United States) Scott Davis (second round)
8. (United States) Tim Mayotte (quarterfinals)

== Draw ==
Key

- Q = Qualifier
- WC = Wild card
- LL = Lucky loser
- Alt = Alternate
- ITF = ITF entry
- PR = Protected ranking
- SR = Special ranking
- SE = Special exempt
- JE = Junior exempt
- JR = Junior Accelerator Programme entrant
- CO = College Accelerator Programme entrant
- NG = Next Gen Accelerator Program entrant
- w/o = Walkover
- r = Retired
- d = Defaulted

=== Finals ===
Semifinals
Q	(United States) Ken Flach	6	5
(United States) Jimmy Arias	7	7
(United States) Johan Kriek	6	6
6	(Czechoslovakia) Tomáš Šmíd	4	3

Final
(United States) Jimmy Arias	6	3	4	2
(United States) Johan Kriek	4	6	6	6

=== Top half ===
First round
1	(United States) J Connors	1	6
(India) V Amritraj	6	7
(United States) T Moor	6	3
Q	(United States) K Flach	7	6
(United Kingdom) J Lloyd	7	7
(United States) M Leach	6	5
Q	(United States) B Teacher	4	5
7	(United States) S Davis	6	7
4	(Australia) P Cash	6	3	6
(United States) J Arias	1	6	7
Q	(New Zealand) R Simpson	3	7	6
Q	(United States) S Meister	6	5	4
(United States) B Gilbert	3	3
(United States) P Annacone	6	6
(United States) L Stefanki	6	5	4
5	(United States) E Teltscher	2	7	6

Second round
(India) V Amritraj	4	2
Q	(United States) K Flach	6	6
(United Kingdom) J Lloyd	6	7
7	(United States) S Davis	4	6
(United States) J Arias	4	7	6
Q	(New Zealand) R Simpson	6	6	2
(United States) P Annacone	3	0
5	(United States) E Teltscher	6	6

Quarterfinals
Q	(United States) K Flach	6	4	6
(United Kingdom) J Lloyd	4	6	4
(United States) J Arias	6	6	7
5	(United States) E Teltscher	7	4	6

Semifinals
Q	(United States) K Flach	6	5
(United States) J Arias	7	7

=== Bottom half ===
First round
8	(United States) T Mayotte	7	1	6
WC	(United States) H Solomon	5	6	2
(Australia) J Fitzgerald	5	6	6
(France) Y Noah	7	4	4
(United States) J Kriek	7	6
(United States) J Sadri	5	1
WC	(United States) V Van Patten	7	1	6
3	(United States) A Krickstein	5	6	3
6	(Czechoslovakia) T Šmíd	6	6	6
(India) R Krishnan	7	2	1
(United States) D Pate	7	6
(United States) B Testerman	6	3
WC	(West Germany) B Becker	7	6
(United States) S Giammalva Jr.	5	1
(Sweden) S Edberg	6	6
2	(United States) K Curren	1	1

Second round
8	(United States) T Mayotte	2	7	7
(Australia) J Fitzgerald	6	5	6
(United States) J Kriek	6	6
WC	(United States) V Van Patten	2	1
6	(Czechoslovakia) T Šmíd	6	6
(United States) D Pate	4	2
WC	(West Germany) B Becker	6	6	6
(Sweden) S Edberg	3	7	2

Quarterfinals
8	(United States) T Mayotte	6	6	3
(United States) J Kriek	4	7	6
6	(Czechoslovakia) T Šmíd	6	6	7
WC	(West Germany) B Becker	4	7	6

Semifinals
(United States) J Kriek	6	6
6	(Czechoslovakia) T Šmíd	4	3
