= 1985 Alan King Tennis Classic =

- Date: April 29 – May 5
- Edition: 13th
- Category: Grand Prix circuit
- Draw: 32S/16D
- Prize money: $400,000
- Surface: Hard / outdoor
- Location: Las Vegas, United States
- Venue: Caesars Palace

Champions

Singles
- (United States) Johan Kriek

Doubles
- (Australia) Pat Cash / (Australia) John Fitzgerald
| ← 1983 · | Alan King Tennis Classic |

The 1985 Alan King Classic was a men's tennis tournament played on outdoor hard courts at Caesars Palace in Las Vegas, United States. It was the 13th and last edition of the event and was part of the 1985 Nabisco Grand Prix circuit. The tournament was held from April 29 through May 5, 1985. Unseeded Johan Kriek won the singles title.

== Finals ==
=== Singles ===
(United States) Johan Kriek defeated (United States) Jimmy Arias 4–6, 6–4, 6–3, 6–2

- It was Kriek's only singles title of the year and the 13th of his career.

=== Doubles ===
(Australia) Pat Cash / (Australia) John Fitzgerald defeated (United States) Paul Annacone / (South Africa) Christo van Rensburg 7–6, 6–7, 7–6
