= 1985 Stockholm Open – Doubles =

Doubles
- 1985 Stockholm Open

Final
- Champions: (France) Guy Forget (Ecuador) Andrés Gómez
- Runners-up: (United States) Mike De Palmer (United States) Gary Donnelly
- Score: 6–3, 6–4

Details
- Draw: 16
- Seeds: 4

Events
Singles	Doubles
- Stockholm Open

Henri Leconte and Tomáš Šmíd were the defending champions, but did not participate this year.

Guy Forget and Andrés Gómez won the title, defeating Mike De Palmer and Gary Donnelly 6–3, 6–4 in the final.

== Seeds ==
1. (Sweden) Joakim Nyström / (Sweden) Mats Wilander (quarterfinals)
2. (Sweden) Stefan Edberg / (Sweden) Anders Järryd (semifinals)
3. (Switzerland) Heinz Günthardt / (Hungary) Balázs Taróczy (first round)
4. N/A

== Draw ==
Key

- Q = Qualifier
- WC = Wild card
- LL = Lucky loser
- Alt = Alternate
- ITF = ITF entry
- PR = Protected ranking
- SR = Special ranking
- SE = Special exempt
- JE = Junior exempt
- JR = Junior Accelerator Programme entrant
- CO = College Accelerator Programme entrant
- NG = Next Gen Accelerator Program entrant
- w/o = Walkover
- r = Retired
- d = Defaulted

=== Draw ===
First round
1	(Sweden) J Nyström (Sweden) M Wilander	6	6
(Sweden) P Hjertquist (Sweden) P Svensson	3	2
(Sweden) J Svensson (Sweden) M Tideman	5	6
(France) G Forget (Ecuador) A Gómez	7	7
LL	(United States) M Davis (United States) L Stefanki
(Spain) S Casal (Spain) E Sánchez	w/o
(Sweden) H Simonsson (Sweden) S Simonsson	6	3	6
(United States) S Denton (United States) S Stewart	4	6	4
(Sweden) J Gunnarsson (Denmark) M Mortensen	5	6
(United States) M De Palmer (United States) G Donnelly	7	7
(United States) S Davis (United States) D Pate	6	4	6
3	(Switzerland) H Günthardt (Hungary) B Taróczy	4	6	3
(United States) M Dickson (United States) T Wilkinson	7	6
(Switzerland) J Hlasek (United States) A Kohlberg	6	1
(United States) M Leach (United States) M Mitchell	3	2
2	(Sweden) S Edberg (Sweden) A Järryd	6	6

Quarterfinals
1	(Sweden) J Nyström (Sweden) M Wilander	7	6	2
(France) G Forget (Ecuador) A Gómez	6	7	6
(Spain) S Casal (Spain) E Sánchez	6	7
(Sweden) H Simonsson (Sweden) S Simonsson	4	6
(United States) M De Palmer (United States) G Donnelly	6	6	6
(United States) S Davis (United States) D Pate	3	7	2
(United States) M Dickson (United States) T Wilkinson	6	3
2	(Sweden) S Edberg (Sweden) A Järryd	7	6

Semifinals
(France) G Forget (Ecuador) A Gómez	7	6
(Spain) S Casal (Spain) E Sánchez	6	3
(United States) M De Palmer (United States) G Donnelly	6	3	7
2	(Sweden) S Edberg (Sweden) A Järryd	4	6	6

Final
(France) G Forget (Ecuador) A Gómez	6	6
(United States) M De Palmer (United States) G Donnelly	3	4
