= 1985 Stockholm Open – Singles =

Singles
- 1985 Stockholm Open

Final
- Champion: (United States) John McEnroe
- Runner-up: (Sweden) Anders Järryd
- Score: 6–1, 6–2

Details
- Draw: 32
- Seeds: 8

Events
Singles	Doubles
- Stockholm Open

John McEnroe was the defending champion, but did not participate this year.

McEnroe successfully defended his title, defeating Anders Järryd 6–1, 6–2 in the final.

== Seeds ==
1. (United States) John McEnroe (champion)
2. (Sweden) Mats Wilander (first round)
3. (Sweden) Stefan Edberg (semifinals)
4. (France) Yannick Noah (quarterfinals)
5. (Sweden) Anders Järryd (final)
6. (United States) Scott Davis (second round)
7. (Sweden) Joakim Nyström (semifinals)
8. (Ecuador) Andrés Gómez (second round)

== Draw ==
Key

- Q = Qualifier
- WC = Wild card
- LL = Lucky loser
- Alt = Alternate
- ITF = ITF entry
- PR = Protected ranking
- SR = Special ranking
- SE = Special exempt
- JE = Junior exempt
- JR = Junior Accelerator Programme entrant
- CO = College Accelerator Programme entrant
- NG = Next Gen Accelerator Program entrant
- w/o = Walkover
- r = Retired
- d = Defaulted

=== Finals ===
Semifinals
1	(United States) John McEnroe	6	7
3	(Sweden) Stefan Edberg	3	6
7	(Sweden) Joakim Nyström	3	6
5	(Sweden) Anders Järryd	6	7

Final
1	(United States) John McEnroe	6	6
5	(Sweden) Anders Järryd	1	2

=== Top half ===
First round
1	(United States) J McEnroe	6	7
(India) R Krishnan	4	6
(France) H Leconte	5	1^{r}
Q	(Spain) JA Rodríguez	7	4
(Czechoslovakia) T Šmíd	6	4	2
WC	(Sweden) P Lundgren	4	6	6
(West Germany) M Westphal	7	4	2
6/WC	(United States) S Davis	5	6	6
3	(Sweden) S Edberg	7	6
(United States) M Dickson	5	2
(United States) T Wilkison	4	6	6
(United States) L Stefanki	6	4	4
(Spain) S Casal	6	6	7
(United States) D Pate	4	7	6
(Sweden) H Sundström	3	1
8	(Ecuador) A Gómez	6	6

Second round
1	(United States) J McEnroe	6	6
Q	(Spain) JA Rodríguez	4	1
WC	(Sweden) P Lundgren	6	3	6
6/WC	(United States) S Davis	4	6	4
3	(Sweden) S Edberg	6	6
(United States) T Wilkison	2	2
(Spain) S Casal	5	6	7
8	(Ecuador) A Gómez	7	3	6

Quarterfinals
1	(United States) J McEnroe	6	6
WC	(Sweden) P Lundgren	1	3
3	(Sweden) S Edberg	6	6
(Spain) S Casal	4	1

Semifinals
1	(United States) J McEnroe	6	7
3	(Sweden) S Edberg	3	6

=== Bottom half ===
First round
7	(Sweden) J Nyström	4	6	6
(United States) M Davis	6	1	2
(United States) M Leach	7	6
WC	(Sweden) K Carlsson	6	4
Q	(Netherlands) M Schapers	5	1
Q	(Spain) E Sánchez	7	6
(United States) J Arias	2	7	6
4	(France) Y Noah	6	5	7
5	(Sweden) A Järryd	6	6
(France) G Forget	4	2
(Sweden) J Gunnarsson	3	3
Q	(Sweden) J Svensson	6	6
(Switzerland) H Günthardt	2	2
(Switzerland) J Hlasek	6	6
(France) T Tulasne	1	6	6
2	(Sweden) M Wilander	6	2	2

Second round
7	(Sweden) J Nyström	6	6
(United States) M Leach	3	2
Q	(Spain) E Sánchez	6	7	1
4	(France) Y Noah	7	6	6
5	(Sweden) A Järryd	5	6	6
Q	(Sweden) J Svensson	7	2	3
(Switzerland) J Hlasek	6	6
(France) T Tulasne	3	3

Quarterfinals
7	(Sweden) J Nyström	6	7
4	(France) Y Noah	2	5
5	(Sweden) A Järryd	6	6
(Switzerland) J Hlasek	2	0

Semifinals
7	(Sweden) J Nyström	3	6
5	(Sweden) A Järryd	6	7
