= 1985 Paine Webber Classic – Singles =

Singles
- 1985 Paine Webber Classic

Final
- Champion: (Czechoslovakia) Ivan Lendl
- Runner-up: (United States) Jimmy Connors
- Score: 6–3, 6–2

Details
- Draw: 32
- Seeds: 8

Events
Singles	Doubles
Paine Webber Classic	· 1986 →

Ivan Lendl won in the final 6–3, 6–2 against Jimmy Connors.

== Seeds ==
1. (United States) Jimmy Connors (final)
2. (Czechoslovakia) Ivan Lendl (champion)
3. (Ecuador) Andrés Gómez (semifinals)
4. (United States) Aaron Krickstein (second round)
5. (France) Yannick Noah (first round)
6. (United States) Eliot Teltscher (quarterfinals)
7. (United States) Johan Kriek (quarterfinals)
8. (United States) Scott Davis (quarterfinals)

== Draw ==
=== Key ===
- Q = Qualifier
- WC = Wild card
- LL = Lucky loser
- Alt = Alternate
- SE = Special exempt
- PR = Protected ranking
- ITF = ITF entry
- JE = Junior exempt
- w/o = Walkover
- r = Retired
- d = Defaulted
- SR = Special ranking

=== Finals ===
Semifinals
1	(United States) Jimmy Connors	3	6	6
3	(Ecuador) Andrés Gómez	6	3	4
(United States) Sammy Giammalva Jr.	2	1
2	(Czechoslovakia) Ivan Lendl	6	6

Final
1	(United States) Jimmy Connors	3	2
2	(Czechoslovakia) Ivan Lendl	6	6

=== Top half ===
First round
1	(United States) J Connors	5	6	6
(Australia) P Doohan	7	1	2
WC	(United States) D Cassidy	6	6
(United States) J Lapidus	4	4
(India) R Krishnan	7	6	4
(Australia) J Fitzgerald	6	7	6
Q	(United States) H Pfister	6	6	5
7	(United States) J Kriek	4	7	7
3	(Ecuador) A Gómez	6	7
(United States) L Shiras	3	6
(United States) Tom Gullikson	6	2	7
WC	(United States) L Jensen	2	6	6
Q	(United States) K Flach	6	6
Q	(United States) R Van't Hof	4	2
(United States) M Bauer	4	6	1
6	(United States) E Teltscher	6	3	6

Second round
1	(United States) J Connors	6	6
WC	(United States) D Cassidy	2	2
(Australia) J Fitzgerald	2	6
7	(United States) J Kriek	6	7
3	(Ecuador) A Gómez	6	2
(United States) Tom Gullikson	1	0	r
Q	(United States) K Flach	4	3
6	(United States) E Teltscher	6	6

Quarterfinals
1	(United States) J Connors	6	6
7	(United States) J Kriek	3	2
3	(Ecuador) A Gómez	7	6
6	(United States) E Teltscher	5	0

Semifinals
1	(United States) J Connors	3	6	6
3	(Ecuador) A Gómez	6	3	4

=== Bottom half ===
First round
8	(United States) S Davis	6	7
(United States) M Davis	4	6
(United States) M Purcell	6	6
WC	(United States) Tim Gullikson	4	3
(United States) S Giammalva Jr.	6	7
(United States) D Pate	4	5
(United States) T Moor	6	7	4
4	(United States) A Krickstein	7	5	6
5	(France) Y Noah	4	6
(United States) B Gilbert	6	7
(United States) B Testerman	6	7	6
(Paraguay) F González	7	5	4
Q	(United States) M Anger	2	2
(United States) G Holmes	6	6
(United Kingdom) J Lloyd	3	3
2	(Czechoslovakia) I Lendl	6	6

Second round
8	(United States) S Davis	6	6
(United States) M Purcell	2	1
(United States) S Giammalva Jr.	7	6
4	(United States) A Krickstein	5	4
(United States) B Gilbert	6	6
(United States) B Testerman	4	4
(United States) G Holmes	4	2
2	(Czechoslovakia) I Lendl	6	6

Quarterfinals
8	(United States) S Davis	2	3
(United States) S Giammalva Jr.	6	6
(United States) B Gilbert	4	2
2	(Czechoslovakia) I Lendl	6	6

Semifinals
(United States) S Giammalva Jr.	2	1
2	(Czechoslovakia) I Lendl	6	6
