= 1985 Fischer-Grand Prix – Singles =

Singles
- 1985 Fischer-Grand Prix

Final
- Champion: (Sweden) Jan Gunnarsson
- Runner-up: (Czechoslovakia) Libor Pimek
- Score: 6–7, 6–2, 6–4, 1–6, 7–5

Details
- Draw: 32
- Seeds: 8

Events
Singles	Doubles
- Vienna Open

Tim Wilkison was the defending champion but did not compete that year.

Jan Gunnarsson won in the final 6–7, 6–2, 6–4, 1–6, 7–5 against Libor Pimek.

== Seeds ==
1. (Sweden) Anders Järryd (second round)
2. (Argentina) Martín Jaite (quarterfinals)
3. (Switzerland) Heinz Günthardt (semifinals)
4. (Spain) Sergio Casal (second round)
5. (Sweden) Jan Gunnarsson (champion)
6. (West Germany) Andreas Maurer (semifinals)
7. (Czechoslovakia) Libor Pimek (final)
8. (Haiti) Ronald Agénor (quarterfinals)

== Draw ==
Key

- Q = Qualifier
- WC = Wild card
- LL = Lucky loser
- Alt = Alternate
- ITF = ITF entry
- PR = Protected ranking
- SR = Special ranking
- SE = Special exempt
- JE = Junior exempt
- JR = Junior Accelerator Programme entrant
- CO = College Accelerator Programme entrant
- NG = Next Gen Accelerator Program entrant
- w/o = Walkover
- r = Retired
- d = Defaulted

=== Final ===
Semifinals
5	(Sweden) Jan Gunnarsson	7	6
WC/3	(Switzerland) Heinz Günthardt	6	2
6	(West Germany) Andreas Maurer	3	2
7	(Czechoslovakia) Libor Pimek	6	6

Final
5	(Sweden) Jan Gunnarsson	6	6	6	1	7
7	(Czechoslovakia) Libor Pimek	7	2	4	6	5

=== Section 1 ===
First round
1	(Sweden) A Järryd	7	6	6
(Socialist Federal Republic of Yugoslavia) G Prpić	6	7	2
(Romania) F Segărceanu	6	4	3
(West Germany) M Westphal	4	6	6
(Spain) E Sánchez	5	4
(Sweden) S Eriksson	7	6
Q	(Czechoslovakia) S Birner	3	4
5	(Sweden) J Gunnarsson	6	6
WC/3	(Switzerland) H Günthardt	6	6
(France) T Benhabiles	0	4
(Hungary) B Taróczy	6	6
Q	(Austria) M Oberleitner	3	3
(Italy) A de Minicis	2	1
Q	(Sweden) C Bergström	6	6
(Czechoslovakia) M Vajda	4	2
8	(Haiti) R Agénor	6	6

Second round
1	(Sweden) A Järryd	4	3
(West Germany) M Westphal	6	6
(Sweden) S Eriksson	6	3
5	(Sweden) J Gunnarsson	7	6
WC/3	(Switzerland) H Günthardt	2	7	6
(Hungary) B Taróczy	6	6	4
Q	(Sweden) C Bergström	3	4
8	(Haiti) R Agénor	6	6

Quarterfinals
(West Germany) M Westphal	1	2
5	(Sweden) J Gunnarsson	6	6
WC/3	(Switzerland) H Günthardt	6	6	7
8	(Haiti) R Agénor	7	3	5

Semifinals
5	(Sweden) J Gunnarsson	7	6
WC/3	(Switzerland) H Günthardt	6	2

=== Section 2 ===
First round
6	(West Germany) A Maurer	7	3	7
(Sweden) S Simonsson	6	6	6
(Austria) T Muster	3	6	6
WC	(Austria) A Antonitsch	6	3	2
(Austria) H Skoff	3	5
(United States) M De Palmer	6	7
Q	(United Kingdom) J Smith	2	7	3
4	(Spain) S Casal	6	6	6
7	(Czechoslovakia) L Pimek	6	6
(Czechoslovakia) J Navrátil	3	4
(Czechoslovakia) P Složil	6	6
(Socialist Federal Republic of Yugoslavia) M Ostoja	3	4
(Austria) H-P Kandler	6	3	4
(Spain) G Urpí	2	6	6
(United States) V Van Patten	5	1
2	(Argentina) M Jaite	7	6

Second round
6	(West Germany) A Maurer	6	6
(Austria) T Muster	3	3
(United States) M De Palmer	6	2	6
4	(Spain) S Casal	2	6	2
7	(Czechoslovakia) L Pimek	2	6	6
(Czechoslovakia) P Složil	6	4	4
(Spain) G Urpí	1	6	4
2	(Argentina) M Jaite	6	4	6

Quarterfinals
6	(West Germany) A Maurer	6	4	6
(United States) M De Palmer	2	6	3
7	(Czechoslovakia) L Pimek	7	4	6
2	(Argentina) M Jaite	5	6	3

Semifinals
6	(West Germany) A Maurer	3	2
7	(Czechoslovakia) L Pimek	6	6
