= 1985 Milan Indoor – Doubles =

Doubles
- 1985 Milan Indoor

Final
- Champions: (Switzerland) Heinz Günthardt (Sweden) Anders Järryd
- Runners-up: (Australia) Broderick Dyke (Australia) Wally Masur
- Score: 6–2, 6–1

Details
- Draw: 16
- Seeds: 4

Events
| Singles | Doubles |
- Milan Indoor

Pavel Složil and Tomáš Šmíd were the defending champions, but lost in the semifinals to Broderick Dyke and Wally Masur.

Heinz Günthardt and Anders Järryd won the title by defeating Dyke and Masur 6–2, 6–1 in the final.

== Seeds ==
1. (Czechoslovakia) Pavel Složil / (Czechoslovakia) Tomáš Šmíd (semifinals)
2. (Switzerland) Heinz Günthardt / (Sweden) Anders Järryd (champions)
3. (Australia) Mark Edmondson / (Australia) Kim Warwick (quarterfinals)
4. (Australia) Broderick Dyke / (Australia) Wally Masur (final)

== Draw ==
Key

- Q = Qualifier
- WC = Wild card
- LL = Lucky loser
- Alt = Alternate
- ITF = ITF entry
- PR = Protected ranking
- SR = Special ranking
- SE = Special exempt
- JE = Junior exempt
- JR = Junior Accelerator Programme entrant
- CO = College Accelerator Programme entrant
- NG = Next Gen Accelerator Program entrant
- w/o = Walkover
- r = Retired
- d = Defaulted

=== Draw ===
First round
1 | (Czechoslovakia) P Složil (Czechoslovakia) T Šmid | 6 | 6
(Czechoslovakia) S Birner (Italy) S Colombo | 1 | 3
(South Africa) C Steyn (South Africa) D Visser | 7 | 6 | 3
(United Kingdom) C Dowdeswell (Netherlands) H van Boeckel | 6 | 7 | 6
4 | (Australia) B Dyke (Australia) W Masur | 7 | 6
(Australia) D Graham (Australia) L Warder | 5 | 4
(Israel) S Glickstein (Brazil) J Soares | 3 | 2
(Switzerland) J Hlasek (Australia) P McNamee | 6 | 6
(Australia) B Drewett (New Zealand) C Lewis | 4 | 6
(United States) V Gerulaitis (United States) J McEnroe | 6 | 7
(Switzerland) M Günthardt (Switzerland) Z Kuhárszky | 4 | 1
3 | (Australia) M Edmondson (Australia) K Warwick | 6 | 6
(United States) L Bourne (United States) T Wilkison | 3 | 4
(Italy) G Ocleppo (Italy) C Panatta | 6 | 6
WC | (United States) S Meister (United States) M Mitchell | 2 | 3
2 | (Switzerland) H Günthardt (Sweden) A Järryd | 6 | 6

Quarterfinals
1 | (Czechoslovakia) P Složil (Czechoslovakia) T Šmid | 6 | 6
(United Kingdom) C Dowdeswell (Netherlands) H van Boeckel | 1 | 2
4 | (Australia) B Dyke (Australia) W Masur | 7 | 6
(Switzerland) J Hlasek (Australia) P McNamee | 5 | 4
(United States) V Gerulaitis (United States) J McEnroe | 7 | 6
3 | (Australia) M Edmondson (Australia) K Warwick | 6 | 4
(Italy) G Ocleppo (Italy) C Panatta | 1^{r}
2 | (Switzerland) H Günthardt (Sweden) A Järryd | 4

Semifinals
1 | (Czechoslovakia) P Složil (Czechoslovakia) T Šmid | 5 | 7 | 3
4 | (Australia) B Dyke (Australia) W Masur | 7 | 6 | 6
(United States) V Gerulaitis (United States) J McEnroe
2 | (Switzerland) H Günthardt (Sweden) A Järryd | w/o

Final
4 | (Australia) B Dyke (Australia) W Masur | 2 | 1
2 | (Switzerland) H Günthardt (Sweden) A Järryd | 6 | 6
