= 1985 Swedish Open – Doubles =

Doubles
- 1985 Swedish Open

Final
- Champions: (Sweden) Stefan Edberg (Sweden) Anders Järryd
- Runners-up: (Spain) Sergio Casal (Spain) Emilio Sánchez
- Score: 6–0, 7–6^{(7–2)}

Events
Singles	Doubles
- Swedish Open

Jan Gunnarsson and Michael Mortensen were the defending champions, but Gunnarsson did not compete this year. Mortensen teamed up with Magnus Tideman and lost in the quarterfinals to Ricki Osterthun and Tore Meinecke.

Stefan Edberg and Anders Järryd won the title by defeating Sergio Casal and Emilio Sánchez 6–0, 7–6^{(7–2)} in the final.

== Seeds ==
1. (Sweden) Stefan Edberg / (Sweden) Anders Järryd (champions)
2. (Brazil) Givaldo Barbosa / (Brazil) Ivan Kley (quarterfinals)
3. (Denmark) Michael Mortensen / (Sweden) Magnus Tideman (quarterfinals)
4. (Sweden) Hans Simonsson / (Sweden) Stefan Simonsson (semifinals)

== Draw ==
Key

- Q = Qualifier
- WC = Wild card
- LL = Lucky loser
- Alt = Alternate
- ITF = ITF entry
- PR = Protected ranking
- SR = Special ranking
- SE = Special exempt
- JE = Junior exempt
- JR = Junior Accelerator Programme entrant
- CO = College Accelerator Programme entrant
- NG = Next Gen Accelerator Program entrant
- w/o = Walkover
- r = Retired
- d = Defaulted

=== Draw ===
First round
1	(Sweden) S Edberg (Sweden) A Järryd	7	6
(Italy) A de Minicis (Switzerland) C Mezzadri	6	1
(Republic of Ireland) M Doyle (Sweden) H Sundström	1	6	4
(Australia) D Cahill (Australia) S Youl	6	4	6
3	(Denmark) M Mortensen (Sweden) M Tideman	2	6	6
(Brazil) T Koch (Brazil) F Roese	6	3	4
(West Germany) P Elter (Socialist Federal Republic of Yugoslavia) M Ostoja	3	3
(West Germany) R Osterthun (West Germany) T Meinecke	6	6
(Sweden) P Hjertquist (Sweden) S Svensson	4	6	6
(Sweden) P Svensson (Sweden) P Lundgren	6	3	1
(Australia) B Drewett (West Germany) D Keretić	7	3	4
4	(Sweden) H Simonsson (Sweden) S Simonsson	5	6	6
(Spain) S Casal (Spain) E Sánchez	w/o
(Sweden) P Carlsson (Sweden) J Svensson
(Spain) J-A Rodriguez-Aransay (Spain) R Sanchez-Rueda	6	4	4
2	(Brazil) G Barbosa (Brazil) I Kley	3	6	6

Quarterfinals
1	(Sweden) S Edberg (Sweden) A Järryd	6	7
(Australia) D Cahill (Australia) S Youl	0	6
3	(Denmark) M Mortensen (Sweden) M Tideman	5	2
(West Germany) R Osterthun (West Germany) T Meinecke	7	6
(Sweden) P Hjertquist (Sweden) S Svensson	1	5
4	(Sweden) H Simonsson (Sweden) S Simonsson	6	7
(Spain) S Casal (Spain) E Sánchez	6	6
2	(Brazil) G Barbosa (Brazil) I Kley	3	4

Semifinals
1	(Sweden) S Edberg (Sweden) A Järryd	6	6
(West Germany) R Osterthun (West Germany) T Meinecke	3	2
4	(Sweden) H Simonsson (Sweden) S Simonsson	6	6	2
(Spain) S Casal (Spain) E Sánchez	3	7	6

Final
1	(Sweden) S Edberg (Sweden) A Järryd	6	7^{7}
(Spain) S Casal (Spain) E Sánchez	0	6^{2}
