= 1987 Grand Prix (tennis) =

Tennis circuit

1987 Nabisco Grand Prix
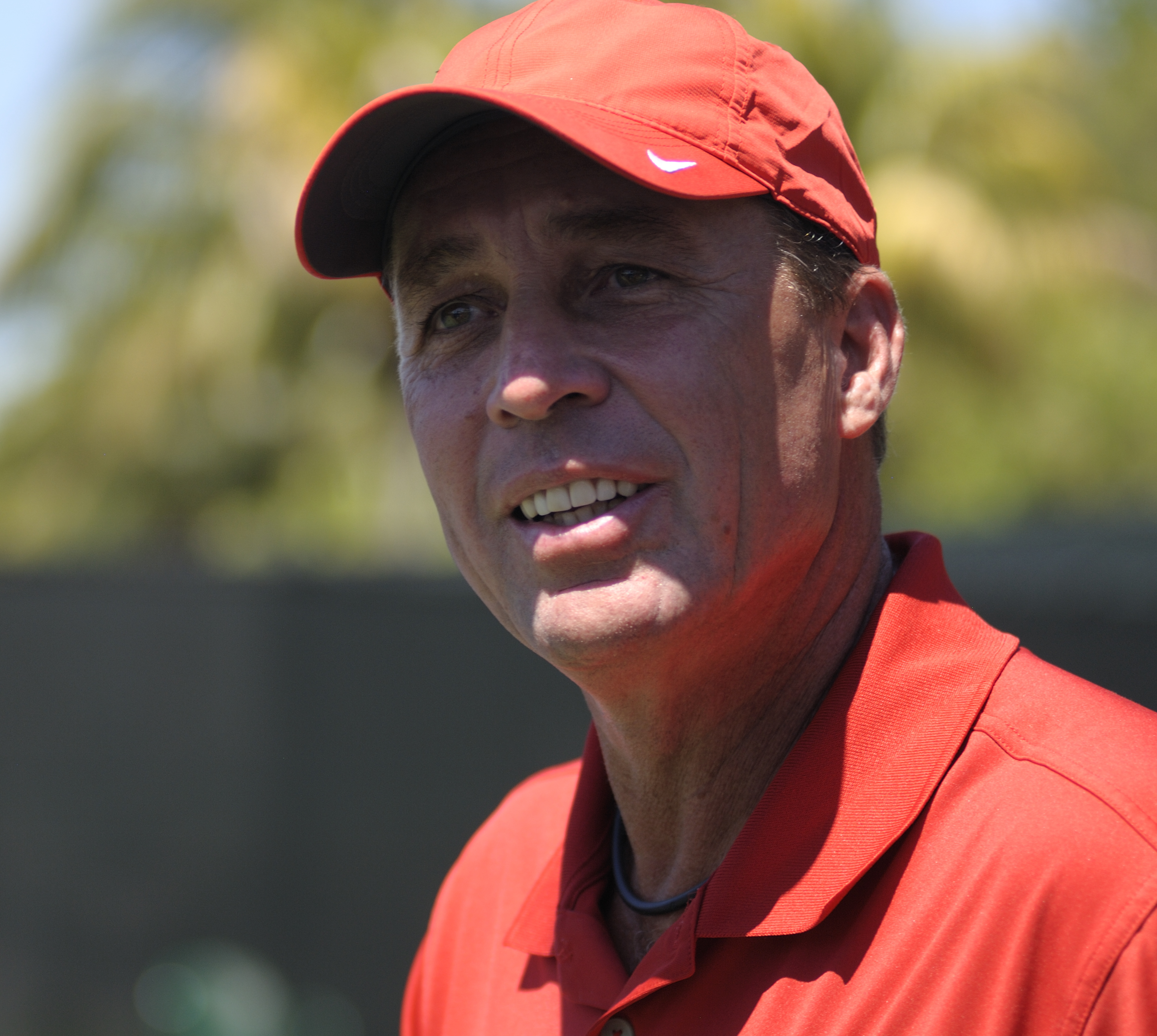
- Ivan Lendl finished the year as world No. 1 for the third time in his career. He won eight titles during the season, including two majors at the French Open and the US Open, as well as the Masters Grand Prix. He also finished runner-up at another major, the Wimbledon Championships.

Details
- Duration: 29 December 1986 – 14 December 1987
- Edition: 18th
- Tournaments: 77

Achievements (singles)
- Most titles: (Czechoslovakia) Ivan Lendl (8)
- Most finals: (Czechoslovakia) Ivan Lendl (12)
- Prize money leader: (Czechoslovakia) Ivan Lendl ($2,003,656)
- Points leader: (Czechoslovakia) Ivan Lendl

Awards
- Player of the year: (Czechoslovakia) Ivan Lendl
- Doubles team of the year: (Sweden) Stefan Edberg; (Sweden) Anders Järryd
- Most improved player of the year: (Sweden) Peter Lundgren

The 1987 Nabisco Grand Prix was the only tennis circuit held that year. It incorporated the four Grand Slam tournaments, three World Championship Tennis tournaments and the Grand Prix tournaments.

== Schedule ==
The table below shows the 1987 Nabisco Grand Prix schedule (a forerunner to the ATP Tour).

Key

Grand Slam events
Team events
World Championship Tennis Event
Year-end championships

=== January ===
Week	Tournament	Champions	Runners-up	Semifinalists	Quarterfinalists
29 Dec	South Australian Open; Adelaide, Australia; Grass – $89,400 – 32S/16D; Singles – Doubles	(Australia) Wally Masur; 6–4, 7–6^{(7–2)}	(United States) Bill Scanlon	(Nigeria) Nduka Odizor (Netherlands) Michiel Schapers	(India) Ramesh Krishnan (Canada) Glenn Michibata (Australia) John Fitzgerald (Israel) Amos Mansdorf
29 Dec	South Australian Open; Adelaide, Australia; Grass – $89,400 – 32S/16D; Singles – Doubles	(Czechoslovakia) Ivan Lendl (United States) Bill Scanlon; 6–7, 6–3, 6–4	(Australia) Peter Doohan (Australia) Laurie Warder	(Nigeria) Nduka Odizor (Netherlands) Michiel Schapers	(India) Ramesh Krishnan (Canada) Glenn Michibata (Australia) John Fitzgerald (Israel) Amos Mansdorf
5 Jan	Benson and Hedges Open; Auckland, New Zealand; Hard – $89,400 – 32S/16D; Singles – Doubles	(Czechoslovakia) Miloslav Mečíř; 6–2, 6–3, 6–4	(Netherlands) Michiel Schapers	(United States) Derrick Rostagno (Australia) Carl Limberger	(New Zealand) Bruce Derlin (India) Ramesh Krishnan (United States) Marcel Freeman (United States) Bud Schultz
5 Jan	Benson and Hedges Open; Auckland, New Zealand; Hard – $89,400 – 32S/16D; Singles – Doubles	(United States) Kelly Jones (United States) Brad Pearce; 7–6, 7–6	(Australia) Carl Limberger (Australia) Mark Woodforde	(United States) Derrick Rostagno (Australia) Carl Limberger	(New Zealand) Bruce Derlin (India) Ramesh Krishnan (United States) Marcel Freeman (United States) Bud Schultz
12 Jan; 19 Jan	Australian Open; Melbourne, Australia; Grand Slam; Grass – $699,984 – 96S/48D/32XD; Singles – Doubles – Mixed doubles	(Sweden) Stefan Edberg; 6–3, 6–4, 3–6, 5–7, 6–3	(Australia) Pat Cash	(Czechoslovakia) Ivan Lendl (Australia) Wally Masur	(Sweden) Anders Järryd (France) Yannick Noah (Czechoslovakia) Miloslav Mečíř (New Zealand) Kelly Evernden
12 Jan; 19 Jan	Australian Open; Melbourne, Australia; Grand Slam; Grass – $699,984 – 96S/48D/32XD; Singles – Doubles – Mixed doubles	(Sweden) Stefan Edberg (Sweden) Anders Järryd; 6–4, 6–4, 7–6	(Australia) Peter Doohan (Australia) Laurie Warder	(Czechoslovakia) Ivan Lendl (Australia) Wally Masur	(Sweden) Anders Järryd (France) Yannick Noah (Czechoslovakia) Miloslav Mečíř (New Zealand) Kelly Evernden
26 Jan	Family Circle NSW Open; Sydney, Australia; Grass – $104,900	(Czechoslovakia) Miloslav Mečíř; 6–2, 6–4	(Australia) Peter Doohan	(Australia) Wally Masur (Australia) Brad Drewett	(United States) Bill Scanlon (New Zealand) Kelly Evernden (Australia) Mark Kratzmann (Nigeria) Nduka Odizor
26 Jan	Family Circle NSW Open; Sydney, Australia; Grass – $104,900	(Australia) Brad Drewett (Australia) Mark Edmondson; 6–4, 4–6, 6–2	(Australia) Peter Doohan (Australia) Laurie Warder	(Australia) Wally Masur (Australia) Brad Drewett	(United States) Bill Scanlon (New Zealand) Kelly Evernden (Australia) Mark Kratzmann (Nigeria) Nduka Odizor
26 Jan	Guarujá Open; Guarujá, Brasil; Hard – $89,400 – 32S/16D	(Brazil) Luiz Mattar; 6–3, 5–7, 6–2	(Brazil) Cássio Motta	(Paraguay) Víctor Pecci (Brazil) Bruno Orešar	(Chile) Ricardo Acuña (Spain) José López Maeso (West Germany) Ivo Werner (Brazil) Júlio Góes
26 Jan	Guarujá Open; Guarujá, Brasil; Hard – $89,400 – 32S/16D	(Brazil) Luiz Mattar (Brazil) Cássio Motta; 7–6, 6–1	(West Germany) Martin Hipp (West Germany) Tore Meinecke	(Paraguay) Víctor Pecci (Brazil) Bruno Orešar	(Chile) Ricardo Acuña (Spain) José López Maeso (West Germany) Ivo Werner (Brazil) Júlio Góes

=== February ===
Week	Tournament	Champions	Runners-up	Semifinalists	Quarterfinalists
2 Feb	Grand Prix de Tennis de Lyon; Lyon, France; Carpet (i) – $174,000 – 32S/16D; Singles – Doubles	(France) Yannick Noah; 6–4, 7–5	(Sweden) Joakim Nyström	(United States) Kelly Jones (United States) Todd Nelson	(United States) Charles Bud Cox (France) Guy Forget (France) Jérôme Potier (United States) Blaine Willenborg
2 Feb	Grand Prix de Tennis de Lyon; Lyon, France; Carpet (i) – $174,000 – 32S/16D; Singles – Doubles	(France) Guy Forget (France) Yannick Noah; 4–6, 6–3, 6–4	(United States) Kelly Jones (United States) David Pate	(United States) Kelly Jones (United States) Todd Nelson	(United States) Charles Bud Cox (France) Guy Forget (France) Jérôme Potier (United States) Blaine Willenborg
2 Feb	Ebel U.S. Pro Indoor; Philadelphia, United States; Carpet (i) – $465,000 – 48S/24D; Singles – Doubles	(United States) Tim Mayotte; 3–6, 6–1, 6–3, 6–1	(United States) John McEnroe	(Israel) Amos Mansdorf (Czechoslovakia) Milan Šrejber	(Switzerland) Jakob Hlasek (United States) Paul Annacone (Czechoslovakia) Karel Nováček (United States) Jimmy Connors
2 Feb	Ebel U.S. Pro Indoor; Philadelphia, United States; Carpet (i) – $465,000 – 48S/24D; Singles – Doubles	(Spain) Sergio Casal (Spain) Emilio Sánchez; 3–6, 6–1, 7–6	(South Africa) Christo Steyn (South Africa) Danie Visser	(Israel) Amos Mansdorf (Czechoslovakia) Milan Šrejber	(Switzerland) Jakob Hlasek (United States) Paul Annacone (Czechoslovakia) Karel Nováček (United States) Jimmy Connors
9 Feb	Volvo U.S. National Indoor; Memphis, United States; Hard (i) – $315,000 – 48S/24D	(Sweden) Stefan Edberg; 6–3, 2–1, ret.	(United States) Jimmy Connors	(United States) Brad Gilbert (Sweden) Mikael Pernfors	(United States) Tim Mayotte (United States) Kevin Curren (United States) Greg Holmes (United States) Johan Kriek
9 Feb	Volvo U.S. National Indoor; Memphis, United States; Hard (i) – $315,000 – 48S/24D	(Sweden) Anders Järryd (Sweden) Jonas Svensson; 6–4, 6–2	(Spain) Sergio Casal (Spain) Emilio Sánchez	(United States) Brad Gilbert (Sweden) Mikael Pernfors	(United States) Tim Mayotte (United States) Kevin Curren (United States) Greg Holmes (United States) Johan Kriek
16 Feb	Pilot Pen Classic; Indian Wells, California, United States; Hard – $435,000 – 56S/28D; Singles – Doubles	(West Germany) Boris Becker; 6–4, 6–4, 7–5	(Sweden) Stefan Edberg	(Sweden) Mats Wilander (France) Yannick Noah	(Czechoslovakia) Miloslav Mečíř (Switzerland) Jakob Hlasek (France) Thierry Tulasne (Spain) Emilio Sánchez
16 Feb	Pilot Pen Classic; Indian Wells, California, United States; Hard – $435,000 – 56S/28D; Singles – Doubles	(France) Guy Forget (France) Yannick Noah; 4–6, 6–3, 6–4	(West Germany) Boris Becker (West Germany) Eric Jelen	(Sweden) Mats Wilander (France) Yannick Noah	(Czechoslovakia) Miloslav Mečíř (Switzerland) Jakob Hlasek (France) Thierry Tulasne (Spain) Emilio Sánchez
23 Feb; 2 Mar	Lipton International Players; Championships; Key Biscayne, United States; Hard – $900,000 – 128S/64D; Singles – Doubles	(Czechoslovakia) Miloslav Mečíř; 7–5, 6–2, 7–5	(Czechoslovakia) Ivan Lendl	(United States) Jimmy Connors (France) Yannick Noah	(United States) Jay Berger (United States) Derrick Rostagno (Sweden) Mats Wilander (Sweden) Stefan Edberg
23 Feb; 2 Mar	Lipton International Players; Championships; Key Biscayne, United States; Hard – $900,000 – 128S/64D; Singles – Doubles	(United States) Paul Annacone (South Africa) Christo van Rensburg; 6–2, 6–4, 6–4	(United States) Ken Flach (United States) Robert Seguso	(United States) Jimmy Connors (France) Yannick Noah	(United States) Jay Berger (United States) Derrick Rostagno (Sweden) Mats Wilander (Sweden) Stefan Edberg

=== March ===
Week	Tournament	Champions	Runners-up	Semifinalists	Quarterfinalists
9 Mar	Davis Cup: First round Prato, Italy – clay Lille, France – carpet (i); Asunción, Paraguay – clay Barcelona, Spain – clay New Delhi, India – grass Hradec Králové, Czechoslovakia – carpet Mexico City, Mexico – clay Adelaide, Australia – grass	First round winners Sweden 3–2; France 5–0; Paraguay 3–2; Spain 3–2; India 3–2; Israel 3–2; Mexico 5–0; Australia 4–1	First round losers Italy; South Korea; United States; West Germany; Argentina; Czechoslovakia; Great Britain; Yugoslavia		
16 Mar	Paine Webber Classic; Orlando, United States; Hard – $315,000 – 32S/16D; Singles – Doubles	(South Africa) Christo van Rensburg; 6–3, 3–6, 6–1	(United States) Jimmy Connors	(United States) Tim Mayotte (United States) Brad Gilbert	(United States) Derrick Rostagno (United States) Tim Wilkison (United States) Marcel Freeman (United States) Paul Annacone
16 Mar	Paine Webber Classic; Orlando, United States; Hard – $315,000 – 32S/16D; Singles – Doubles	(United States) Sherwood Stewart (Australia) Kim Warwick; 2–6, 7–6, 6–4	(United States) Paul Annacone (South Africa) Christo van Rensburg	(United States) Tim Mayotte (United States) Brad Gilbert	(United States) Derrick Rostagno (United States) Tim Wilkison (United States) Marcel Freeman (United States) Paul Annacone
16 Mar	ABN World Tennis Tournament; Rotterdam, Netherlands; Carpet – $315,000 – 32S/16D; Singles – Doubles	(Sweden) Stefan Edberg; 3–6, 6–3, 6–1	(United States) John McEnroe	(United States) Jim Grabb (Czechoslovakia) Miloslav Mečíř	(Sweden) Anders Järryd (United States) Chip Hooper (Israel) Amos Mansdorf (Sweden) Jonas Svensson
16 Mar	ABN World Tennis Tournament; Rotterdam, Netherlands; Carpet – $315,000 – 32S/16D; Singles – Doubles	(Sweden) Stefan Edberg (Sweden) Anders Järryd; 3–6, 6–3, 6–4	(United States) Chip Hooper (United States) Mike Leach	(United States) Jim Grabb (Czechoslovakia) Miloslav Mečíř	(Sweden) Anders Järryd (United States) Chip Hooper (Israel) Amos Mansdorf (Sweden) Jonas Svensson
23 Mar	Donnay Indoor Championships; Brussels, Belgium; Carpet – $315,000 – 32S/16D	(Sweden) Mats Wilander; 6–3, 6–4	(United States) John McEnroe	(Sweden) Anders Järryd (Sweden) Jonas Svensson	(West Germany) Boris Becker (Switzerland) Jakob Hlasek (Sweden) Jan Gunnarsson (Israel) Gilad Bloom
23 Mar	Donnay Indoor Championships; Brussels, Belgium; Carpet – $315,000 – 32S/16D	(West Germany) Boris Becker (Socialist Federal Republic of Yugoslavia) Slobodan Živojinović; 7–6, 7–6	(United States) Chip Hooper (United States) Mike Leach	(Sweden) Anders Järryd (Sweden) Jonas Svensson	(West Germany) Boris Becker (Switzerland) Jakob Hlasek (Sweden) Jan Gunnarsson (Israel) Gilad Bloom
23 Mar	Lorraine Open; Nancy, France; Carpet – $104,900 – 32S/16D	(Australia) Pat Cash; 6–2, 6–3	(Australia) Wally Masur	(India) Ramesh Krishnan (Australia) Brad Drewett	(United States) Jim Grabb (Iran) Mansour Bahrami (United States) Mark Dickson (Sweden) Christian Bergström
23 Mar	Lorraine Open; Nancy, France; Carpet – $104,900 – 32S/16D	(India) Ramesh Krishnan (Switzerland) Claudio Mezzadri; 6–4, 6–4	(Canada) Grant Connell (United States) Larry Scott	(India) Ramesh Krishnan (Australia) Brad Drewett	(United States) Jim Grabb (Iran) Mansour Bahrami (United States) Mark Dickson (Sweden) Christian Bergström
30 Mar	Chicago Grand Prix; Chicago, United States; Carpet – $315,000 – 32S/16D; Singles – Doubles	(United States) Tim Mayotte; 6–4, 6–2	(United States) David Pate	(United States) Bill Scanlon (United States) Eliot Teltscher	(United States) Mel Purcell (United States) Scott Davis (United States) Peter Fleming (United States) Jimmy Connors
30 Mar	Chicago Grand Prix; Chicago, United States; Carpet – $315,000 – 32S/16D; Singles – Doubles	(United States) Paul Annacone (South Africa) Christo van Rensburg; 6–3, 7–5	(United States) Mike De Palmer (United States) Gary Donnelly	(United States) Bill Scanlon (United States) Eliot Teltscher	(United States) Mel Purcell (United States) Scott Davis (United States) Peter Fleming (United States) Jimmy Connors
30 Mar	Fila Trophy; Milan, Italy; Carpet – $345,000 – 32S/16D; Singles – Doubles	(West Germany) Boris Becker; 6–4, 6–3	(Czechoslovakia) Miloslav Mečíř	(Socialist Federal Republic of Yugoslavia) Slobodan Živojinović (Sweden) Mats Wilander	(Switzerland) Jakob Hlasek (Italy) Paolo Canè (Spain) Emilio Sánchez (Czechoslovakia) Tomáš Šmíd
30 Mar	Fila Trophy; Milan, Italy; Carpet – $345,000 – 32S/16D; Singles – Doubles	(West Germany) Boris Becker (Socialist Federal Republic of Yugoslavia) Slobodan Živojinović; 3–6, 6–3, 6–4	(Spain) Sergio Casal (Spain) Emilio Sánchez	(Socialist Federal Republic of Yugoslavia) Slobodan Živojinović (Sweden) Mats Wilander	(Switzerland) Jakob Hlasek (Italy) Paolo Canè (Spain) Emilio Sánchez (Czechoslovakia) Tomáš Šmíd

=== April ===
Week	Tournament	Champions	Runners-up	Semifinalists	Quarterfinalists
6 Apr	Hypo Group Tennis International; Bari, Italy; Clay – $104,900 – 32S/16D	(Italy) Claudio Pistolesi; 6–7, 7–5, 6–3	(Italy) Francesco Cancellotti	(Argentina) Horacio de la Peña (Sweden) Ulf Stenlund	(France) Thierry Tulasne (Spain) Juan Avendaño (West Germany) Ricki Osterthun (Argentina) Franco Davín
6 Apr	Hypo Group Tennis International; Bari, Italy; Clay – $104,900 – 32S/16D	(Sweden) Christer Allgårdh (Sweden) Ulf Stenlund; 2–6, 7–5, 7–5	(Argentina) Roberto Azar (Argentina) Marcelo Ingaramo	(Argentina) Horacio de la Peña (Sweden) Ulf Stenlund	(France) Thierry Tulasne (Spain) Juan Avendaño (West Germany) Ricki Osterthun (Argentina) Franco Davín
6 Apr	WCT Finals; Dallas, United States; Carpet – $675,000 – 9/S; Singles	(Czechoslovakia) Miloslav Mečíř; 6–0, 3–6, 6–2, 6–2	(United States) John McEnroe	(Sweden) Stefan Edberg (Ecuador) Andrés Gómez	(United States) Kevin Curren (Sweden) Mats Wilander (France) Yannick Noah (United States) Tim Mayotte
13 Apr	Nice International Open; Nice, France; Clay – $104,900 – 32S/16D	(Sweden) Kent Carlsson; 7–6, 6–3	(Spain) Emilio Sánchez	(Soviet Union) Andrei Chesnokov (France) Thierry Tulasne	(Haiti) Ronald Agénor (Argentina) Martín Jaite (United States) Aaron Krickstein (Czechoslovakia) Marián Vajda
13 Apr	Nice International Open; Nice, France; Clay – $104,900 – 32S/16D	(Spain) Sergio Casal (Spain) Emilio Sánchez; 6–3, 6–3	(Switzerland) Claudio Mezzadri (Italy) Gianni Ocleppo	(Soviet Union) Andrei Chesnokov (France) Thierry Tulasne	(Haiti) Ronald Agénor (Argentina) Martín Jaite (United States) Aaron Krickstein (Czechoslovakia) Marián Vajda
13 Apr	Japan Open Tennis Championships; Tokyo, Japan; Hard – $495,000 – 56S/28D; Singles – Doubles	(Sweden) Stefan Edberg; 7–6^{(7–2)}, 6–4	(United States) David Pate	(United States) Scott Davis (Ecuador) Andrés Gómez	(United States) Johan Kriek (United States) Jimmy Connors (United States) Andre Agassi (Sweden) Anders Järryd
13 Apr	Japan Open Tennis Championships; Tokyo, Japan; Hard – $495,000 – 56S/28D; Singles – Doubles	(United States) Paul Annacone (United States) Kevin Curren; 6–4, 7–6	(Ecuador) Andrés Gómez (Sweden) Anders Järryd	(United States) Scott Davis (Ecuador) Andrés Gómez	(United States) Johan Kriek (United States) Jimmy Connors (United States) Andre Agassi (Sweden) Anders Järryd
20 Apr	Monte Carlo Open; Roquebrune-Cap-Martin, France; Clay – $513,000 – 48S/24D; Singles – Doubles	(Sweden) Mats Wilander; 4–6, 7–5, 6–1, 6–3	(United States) Jimmy Arias	(Austria) Horst Skoff (Sweden) Ulf Stenlund	(Sweden) Kent Carlsson (Ecuador) Andrés Gómez (Soviet Union) Andrei Chesnokov (Argentina) Martín Jaite
20 Apr	Monte Carlo Open; Roquebrune-Cap-Martin, France; Clay – $513,000 – 48S/24D; Singles – Doubles	(Chile) Hans Gildemeister (Ecuador) Andrés Gómez; 6–2, 6–4	(Iran) Mansour Bahrami (Denmark) Michael Mortensen	(Austria) Horst Skoff (Sweden) Ulf Stenlund	(Sweden) Kent Carlsson (Ecuador) Andrés Gómez (Soviet Union) Andrei Chesnokov (Argentina) Martín Jaite
20 Apr	Seoul Open; Seoul, South Korea; 89,400 – hard – 32S/16D; Singles – Doubles	(United States) Jim Grabb; 1–6, 6–4, 6–2	(United States) Andre Agassi	(United States) Ben Testerman (France) Jean-Philippe Fleurian	(Australia) John Fitzgerald (United States) Mike Leach (United States) John Sadri (Netherlands) Michiel Schapers
20 Apr	Seoul Open; Seoul, South Korea; 89,400 – hard – 32S/16D; Singles – Doubles	(United States) Eric Korita (United States) Mike Leach; 6–7, 6–1, 7–5	(United States) Ken Flach (United States) Jim Grabb	(United States) Ben Testerman (France) Jean-Philippe Fleurian	(Australia) John Fitzgerald (United States) Mike Leach (United States) John Sadri (Netherlands) Michiel Schapers
27 Apr	Ebel German Open; Hamburg, West Germany; Clay – $375,000 – 56S/28D	(Czechoslovakia) Ivan Lendl; 6–1, 6–3, 6–3	(Czechoslovakia) Miloslav Mečíř	(Sweden) Kent Carlsson (Argentina) Eduardo Bengoechea	(France) Thierry Tulasne (Spain) Emilio Sánchez (Sweden) Mikael Pernfors (Argentina) Martín Jaite
27 Apr	Ebel German Open; Hamburg, West Germany; Clay – $375,000 – 56S/28D	(Czechoslovakia) Miloslav Mečíř (Czechoslovakia) Tomáš Šmíd; 4–6, 7–6, 6–2	(Switzerland) Claudio Mezzadri (United States) Jim Pugh	(Sweden) Kent Carlsson (Argentina) Eduardo Bengoechea	(France) Thierry Tulasne (Spain) Emilio Sánchez (Sweden) Mikael Pernfors (Argentina) Martín Jaite

=== May ===
Week	Tournament	Champions	Runners-up	Semifinalists	Quarterfinalists
4 May	Shearson Lehman Brothers; Tournament of Champions; New York City, United States; Clay – $615,000 – 64S/32D	(Ecuador) Andrés Gómez; 6–4, 7–6^{(7–5)}, 7–6^{(7–1)}	(France) Yannick Noah	(West Germany) Boris Becker (Socialist Federal Republic of Yugoslavia) Slobodan Živojinović	(Argentina) Guillermo Vilas (Argentina) Martín Jaite (United States) Paul Annacone (United States) Aaron Krickstein
4 May	Shearson Lehman Brothers; Tournament of Champions; New York City, United States; Clay – $615,000 – 64S/32D	(France) Guy Forget (France) Yannick Noah; 4–6, 6–4, 6–1	(United States) Gary Donnelly (United States) Peter Fleming	(West Germany) Boris Becker (Socialist Federal Republic of Yugoslavia) Slobodan Živojinović	(Argentina) Guillermo Vilas (Argentina) Martín Jaite (United States) Paul Annacone (United States) Aaron Krickstein
4 May	BMW Open; Munich, West Germany; Clay – $174,000 – 32S/16D; Singles – Doubles	(Argentina) Guillermo Pérez Roldán; 6–3, 7–6	(Czechoslovakia) Marián Vajda	(United States) Mel Purcell (Sweden) Joakim Nyström	(West Germany) Carl-Uwe Steeb (Spain) Sergio Casal (Australia) Carl Limberger (United States) Johan Kriek
4 May	BMW Open; Munich, West Germany; Clay – $174,000 – 32S/16D; Singles – Doubles	(United States) Jim Pugh (United States) Blaine Willenborg; 7–6, 4–6, 6–4	(Spain) Sergio Casal (Spain) Emilio Sánchez	(United States) Mel Purcell (Sweden) Joakim Nyström	(West Germany) Carl-Uwe Steeb (Spain) Sergio Casal (Australia) Carl Limberger (United States) Johan Kriek
11 May	Italian Open; Rome, Italy; Clay – $495,000 – 64S/32D; Singles – Doubles	(Sweden) Mats Wilander; 6–3, 6–4, 6–4	(Argentina) Martín Jaite	(Sweden) Joakim Nyström (United States) John McEnroe	(Sweden) Kent Carlsson (Italy) Paolo Canè (Switzerland) Claudio Mezzadri (Ecuador) Andrés Gómez
11 May	Italian Open; Rome, Italy; Clay – $495,000 – 64S/32D; Singles – Doubles	(France) Guy Forget (France) Yannick Noah; 6–2, 6–7, 6–3	(Czechoslovakia) Miloslav Mečíř (Czechoslovakia) Tomáš Šmíd	(Sweden) Joakim Nyström (United States) John McEnroe	(Sweden) Kent Carlsson (Italy) Paolo Canè (Switzerland) Claudio Mezzadri (Ecuador) Andrés Gómez
18 May	Torneo Internazionale Città di Firenze; Florence, Italy; Clay – $89,400 – 32S/16D	(Soviet Union) Andrei Chesnokov; 6–1, 6–3	(Italy) Alessandro de Minicis	(Argentina) Eduardo Bengoechea (Argentina) Guillermo Pérez Roldán	(United States) Mark Dickson (Italy) Paolo Canè (Italy) Claudio Panatta (Peru) Jaime Yzaga
18 May	Torneo Internazionale Città di Firenze; Florence, Italy; Clay – $89,400 – 32S/16D	(West Germany) Wolfgang Popp (West Germany) Udo Riglewski; 6–4, 6–4	(Italy) Paolo Canè (Italy) Gianni Ocleppo	(Argentina) Eduardo Bengoechea (Argentina) Guillermo Pérez Roldán	(United States) Mark Dickson (Italy) Paolo Canè (Italy) Claudio Panatta (Peru) Jaime Yzaga
18 May	World Team Cup; Düsseldorf, West Germany; Clay	(Czechoslovakia) Czechoslovakia; 2–1	United States		
25 May; 1 Jun	French Open; Paris, France; Grand Slam; Clay – FF19,948,960 – 128S/64D/64XD; Singles – Doubles – Mixed doubles	(Czechoslovakia) Ivan Lendl; 7–5, 6–2, 3–6, 7–6^{(7–3)}	(Sweden) Mats Wilander	(Czechoslovakia) Miloslav Mečíř (West Germany) Boris Becker	(Ecuador) Andrés Gómez (Czechoslovakia) Karel Nováček (France) Yannick Noah (United States) Jimmy Connors
25 May; 1 Jun	French Open; Paris, France; Grand Slam; Clay – FF19,948,960 – 128S/64D/64XD; Singles – Doubles – Mixed doubles	(Sweden) Anders Järryd (United States) Robert Seguso; 6–7^{(5–7)}, 6–7^{(2–7)}, 6–3, 6–4, 6–2	(France) Guy Forget (France) Yannick Noah	(Czechoslovakia) Miloslav Mečíř (West Germany) Boris Becker	(Ecuador) Andrés Gómez (Czechoslovakia) Karel Nováček (France) Yannick Noah (United States) Jimmy Connors
25 May; 1 Jun	French Open; Paris, France; Grand Slam; Clay – FF19,948,960 – 128S/64D/64XD; Singles – Doubles – Mixed doubles	(Spain) Emilio Sánchez Vicario (United States) Pam Shriver; 6–3, 7–6^{(7–4)}	(United States) Sherwood Stewart (United States) Lori McNeil	(Czechoslovakia) Miloslav Mečíř (West Germany) Boris Becker	(Ecuador) Andrés Gómez (Czechoslovakia) Karel Nováček (France) Yannick Noah (United States) Jimmy Connors

=== June ===
Week	Tournament	Champions	Runners-up	Semifinalists	Quarterfinalists
8 Jun	Bologna Open; Bologna, Italy; Clay – $89,400 – 32S/16D	(Sweden) Kent Carlsson; 6–2, 6–1	(Spain) Emilio Sánchez	(Italy) Paolo Canè (Argentina) Martín Jaite	(Argentina) Franco Davín (France) Thierry Tulasne (United States) Blaine Willenborg (United States) Jimmy Brown
8 Jun	Bologna Open; Bologna, Italy; Clay – $89,400 – 32S/16D	(Spain) Sergio Casal (Spain) Emilio Sánchez; 6–3, 6–2	(Italy) Claudio Panatta (United States) Blaine Willenborg	(Italy) Paolo Canè (Argentina) Martín Jaite	(Argentina) Franco Davín (France) Thierry Tulasne (United States) Blaine Willenborg (United States) Jimmy Brown
8 Jun	Stella Artois Championships; London, United Kingdom; Grass – $250,000 – 64S/32D; Singles – Doubles	(West Germany) Boris Becker; 6–7^{(3–7)}, 6–3, 6–4	(United States) Jimmy Connors	(United States) Tim Mayotte (Australia) Pat Cash	(United States) David Pate (India) Ramesh Krishnan (West Germany) Eric Jelen (Sweden) Stefan Edberg
8 Jun	Stella Artois Championships; London, United Kingdom; Grass – $250,000 – 64S/32D; Singles – Doubles	(France) Guy Forget (France) Yannick Noah; 6–4, 6–4	(United States) Rick Leach (United States) Tim Pawsat	(United States) Tim Mayotte (Australia) Pat Cash	(United States) David Pate (India) Ramesh Krishnan (West Germany) Eric Jelen (Sweden) Stefan Edberg
15 Jun	Athens Open; Athens, Greece; Clay – $117,000 – 32S/16D; Singles – Doubles	(Argentina) Guillermo Pérez Roldán; 6–2, 6–3	(West Germany) Tore Meinecke	(Argentina) Francisco Yunis (West Germany) Pavel Vojtíšek	(Chile) Pedro Rebolledo (Czechoslovakia) Jaroslav Navrátil (Austria) Horst Skoff (Czechoslovakia) Marián Vajda
15 Jun	Athens Open; Athens, Greece; Clay – $117,000 – 32S/16D; Singles – Doubles	(West Germany) Tore Meinecke (West Germany) Ricki Osterthun; 6–2, 3–6, 6–2	(Czechoslovakia) Jaroslav Navrátil (Netherlands) Tom Nijssen	(Argentina) Francisco Yunis (West Germany) Pavel Vojtíšek	(Chile) Pedro Rebolledo (Czechoslovakia) Jaroslav Navrátil (Austria) Horst Skoff (Czechoslovakia) Marián Vajda
15 Jun	Bristol Trophy; Bristol, United Kingdom; Grass – $117,000 – 48S/16D; Singles	(New Zealand) Kelly Evernden; 6–4, 7–6^{(8–6)}	(United States) Tim Wilkison	(Netherlands) Michiel Schapers (West Germany) Eric Jelen	(France) Henri Leconte (United States) Ben Testerman (United States) Eddie Edwards (France) Éric Winogradsky
22 Jun; 29 Jun	Wimbledon Championships; London, United Kingdom; Grand Slam; Grass – £2,119,780 – 128S/64D/64XD; Singles – Doubles – Mixed doubles	(Australia) Pat Cash; 7–6^{(7–5)}, 6–2, 7–5	(Czechoslovakia) Ivan Lendl	(United States) Jimmy Connors (Sweden) Stefan Edberg	(Socialist Federal Republic of Yugoslavia) Slobodan Živojinović (Sweden) Mats Wilander (Sweden) Anders Järryd (France) Henri Leconte
22 Jun; 29 Jun	Wimbledon Championships; London, United Kingdom; Grand Slam; Grass – £2,119,780 – 128S/64D/64XD; Singles – Doubles – Mixed doubles	(United States) Ken Flach (United States) Robert Seguso; 3–6, 6–7^{(6–8)}, 7–6^{(7–3)}, 6–1, 6–4	(Spain) Sergio Casal (Spain) Emilio Sánchez	(United States) Jimmy Connors (Sweden) Stefan Edberg	(Socialist Federal Republic of Yugoslavia) Slobodan Živojinović (Sweden) Mats Wilander (Sweden) Anders Järryd (France) Henri Leconte
22 Jun; 29 Jun	Wimbledon Championships; London, United Kingdom; Grand Slam; Grass – £2,119,780 – 128S/64D/64XD; Singles – Doubles – Mixed doubles	(United Kingdom) Jeremy Bates (United Kingdom) Jo Durie; 7–6^{(12–10)}, 6–3	(Australia) Darren Cahill (Australia) Nicole Provis	(United States) Jimmy Connors (Sweden) Stefan Edberg	(Socialist Federal Republic of Yugoslavia) Slobodan Živojinović (Sweden) Mats Wilander (Sweden) Anders Järryd (France) Henri Leconte

=== July ===
Week	Tournament	Champions	Runners-up	Semifinalists	Quarterfinalists
6 Jul	U.S. Pro Tennis Championships; Boston, United States; Clay – $293,400 – 56S/28D	(Sweden) Mats Wilander; 7–6^{(7–5)}, 6–1	(Sweden) Kent Carlsson	(Argentina) Martín Jaite (Ecuador) Andrés Gómez	(Netherlands) Tom Nijssen (United States) Aaron Krickstein (Sweden) Joakim Nyström (United States) Jimmy Arias
6 Jul	U.S. Pro Tennis Championships; Boston, United States; Clay – $293,400 – 56S/28D	(Chile) Hans Gildemeister (Ecuador) Andrés Gómez; 7–6, 3–6, 6–1	(Sweden) Joakim Nyström (Sweden) Mats Wilander	(Argentina) Martín Jaite (Ecuador) Andrés Gómez	(Netherlands) Tom Nijssen (United States) Aaron Krickstein (Sweden) Joakim Nyström (United States) Jimmy Arias
6 Jul	Rado Swiss Open; Gstaad, Switzerland; Clay – $231,000 – 32S/16D	(Spain) Emilio Sánchez; 6–2, 6–3, 7–6^{(7–5)}	(Haiti) Ronald Agénor	(Argentina) Eduardo Bengoechea (Switzerland) Claudio Mezzadri	(Spain) Alberto Tous (Sweden) Mikael Pernfors (France) Guy Forget (Czechoslovakia) Marián Vajda
6 Jul	Rado Swiss Open; Gstaad, Switzerland; Clay – $231,000 – 32S/16D	(Sweden) Jan Gunnarsson (Czechoslovakia) Tomáš Šmíd; 7–6, 6–2	(France) Loïc Courteau (France) Guy Forget	(Argentina) Eduardo Bengoechea (Switzerland) Claudio Mezzadri	(Spain) Alberto Tous (Sweden) Mikael Pernfors (France) Guy Forget (Czechoslovakia) Marián Vajda
6 Jul	Hall of Fame Tennis Championships; Newport, United States; Grass – $117,000 – 32S/16D; Singles – Doubles	(United States) Dan Goldie; 6–7^{(5–7)}, 6–4, 6–4	(United States) Sammy Giammalva	(Australia) Wally Masur (South Africa) Christo van Rensburg	(United States) Marc Flur (Australia) John Fitzgerald (United States) Joey Rive (Australia) Brad Drewett
6 Jul	Hall of Fame Tennis Championships; Newport, United States; Grass – $117,000 – 32S/16D; Singles – Doubles	(United States) Dan Goldie (United States) Larry Scott; 6–3, 4–6, 6–4	(United States) Chip Hooper (United States) Mike Leach	(Australia) Wally Masur (South Africa) Christo van Rensburg	(United States) Marc Flur (Australia) John Fitzgerald (United States) Joey Rive (Australia) Brad Drewett
13 Jul	Nabisco Grand Prix Passing Shot; Bordeaux, France $125,000 – 32S/16D; Singles – Doubles	(Spain) Emilio Sánchez; 5–7, 6–4, 6–4	(Haiti) Ronald Agénor	(New Zealand) Bruce Derlin (Spain) Gabriel Urpí	(Spain) David de Miguel (United Kingdom) Steve Shaw (Italy) Massimo Cierro (France) Thierry Champion
13 Jul	Nabisco Grand Prix Passing Shot; Bordeaux, France $125,000 – 32S/16D; Singles – Doubles	(Spain) Sergio Casal (Spain) Emilio Sánchez; 6–3, 6–3	(Australia) Darren Cahill (Australia) Mark Woodforde	(New Zealand) Bruce Derlin (Spain) Gabriel Urpí	(Spain) David de Miguel (United Kingdom) Steve Shaw (Italy) Massimo Cierro (France) Thierry Champion
13 Jul	U.S. Clay Court Championships; Indianapolis, US; Clay – $375,000 – 56S/28D; Singles – Doubles	(Sweden) Mats Wilander; 7–5, 6–3	(Sweden) Kent Carlsson	(Sweden) Joakim Nyström (Argentina) Guillermo Pérez Roldán	(United States) Richey Reneberg (Argentina) Martín Jaite (West Germany) Patrik Kühnen (South Africa) Gary Muller
13 Jul	U.S. Clay Court Championships; Indianapolis, US; Clay – $375,000 – 56S/28D; Singles – Doubles	(Australia) Laurie Warder (United States) Blaine Willenborg; 6–0, 6–3	(Sweden) Joakim Nyström (Sweden) Mats Wilander	(Sweden) Joakim Nyström (Argentina) Guillermo Pérez Roldán	(United States) Richey Reneberg (Argentina) Martín Jaite (West Germany) Patrik Kühnen (South Africa) Gary Muller
13 Jul	Mennen Cup; Livingston, New Jersey, US; Hard – $104,900 – 32S/16D; Singles – Doubles	(United States) Johan Kriek; 7–6^{(7–4)}, 3–6, 6–2	(West Germany) Christian Saceanu	(Austria) Alex Antonitsch (United States) Marc Flur	(Canada) Stéphane Bonneau (United States) Marcel Freeman (United States) Ken Flach (Australia) Wally Masur
13 Jul	Mennen Cup; Livingston, New Jersey, US; Hard – $104,900 – 32S/16D; Singles – Doubles	(United States) Gary Donnelly (United States) Greg Holmes; 7–6, 6–3	(United States) Ken Flach (United States) Robert Seguso	(Austria) Alex Antonitsch (United States) Marc Flur	(Canada) Stéphane Bonneau (United States) Marcel Freeman (United States) Ken Flach (Australia) Wally Masur
13 Jul	Mercedes Cup; Stuttgart, Germany; Clay – $231,000 – 48S/24D; Singles – Doubles	(Czechoslovakia) Miloslav Mečíř; 6–0, 6–2	(Sweden) Jan Gunnarsson	(Czechoslovakia) Tomáš Šmíd (West Germany) Carl-Uwe Steeb	(Czechoslovakia) Marián Vajda (Argentina) Eduardo Bengoechea (Switzerland) Jakob Hlasek (France) Henri Leconte
13 Jul	Mercedes Cup; Stuttgart, Germany; Clay – $231,000 – 48S/24D; Singles – Doubles	(United States) Rick Leach (United States) Tim Pawsat; 6–3, 6–4	(Sweden) Mikael Pernfors (Sweden) Magnus Tideman	(Czechoslovakia) Tomáš Šmíd (West Germany) Carl-Uwe Steeb	(Czechoslovakia) Marián Vajda (Argentina) Eduardo Bengoechea (Switzerland) Jakob Hlasek (France) Henri Leconte
20 Jul	Davis Cup: Quarterfinals; Fréjus, Cannes, France – clay Caracas, Venezuela – clay New Delhi, India – grass Brisbane, Australia – grass	Quarterfinal winners Sweden 4–1; Spain 3–2; India 4–0; Australia 4–1	Quarterfinal losers France; Paraguay; Israel; Mexico		
20 Jul	OTB Open; Schenectady, United States $89,400 – 32S/16D; Singles – Doubles	(Peru) Jaime Yzaga; 0–6, 7–6, 6–1	(United States) Jim Pugh	(Nigeria) Tony Mmoh (Sweden) Thomas Högstedt	(United States) Jay Lapidus (United States) Vincent Van Patten (United States) Ben Testerman (South Africa) Gary Muller
20 Jul	OTB Open; Schenectady, United States $89,400 – 32S/16D; Singles – Doubles	(United States) Gary Donnelly (South Africa) Gary Muller; 7–6, 6–2	(United States) Brad Pearce (United States) Jim Pugh	(Nigeria) Tony Mmoh (Sweden) Thomas Högstedt	(United States) Jay Lapidus (United States) Vincent Van Patten (United States) Ben Testerman (South Africa) Gary Muller
27 Jul	Sovran Bank D.C. National Tennis Classic; Washington, D.C., US; Hard – $293,400 – 56S/28D; Singles – Doubles	(Czechoslovakia) Ivan Lendl; 6–1, 6–0	(United States) Brad Gilbert	(United States) Jimmy Connors (West Germany) Boris Becker	(United States) Jimmy Arias (United States) Todd Witsken (United States) Marty Davis (United States) Jay Berger
27 Jul	Sovran Bank D.C. National Tennis Classic; Washington, D.C., US; Hard – $293,400 – 56S/28D; Singles – Doubles	(United States) Gary Donnelly (United States) Peter Fleming; 6–2, 7–6	(Australia) Laurie Warder (United States) Blaine Willenborg	(United States) Jimmy Connors (West Germany) Boris Becker	(United States) Jimmy Arias (United States) Todd Witsken (United States) Marty Davis (United States) Jay Berger
27 Jul	Swedish Open; Båstad, Sweden; Clay – $202,500 – 32S/16D; Singles – Doubles	(Sweden) Joakim Nyström; 4–6, 6–0, 6–3	(Sweden) Stefan Edberg	(Sweden) Mats Wilander (Spain) Emilio Sánchez	(Sweden) Jan Gunnarsson (Sweden) Kent Carlsson (Sweden) Anders Järryd (West Germany) Pavel Vojtíšek
27 Jul	Swedish Open; Båstad, Sweden; Clay – $202,500 – 32S/16D; Singles – Doubles	(Sweden) Stefan Edberg (Sweden) Anders Järryd; 7–6, 6–3	(Spain) Emilio Sánchez (Spain) Javier Sánchez	(Sweden) Mats Wilander (Spain) Emilio Sánchez	(Sweden) Jan Gunnarsson (Sweden) Kent Carlsson (Sweden) Anders Järryd (West Germany) Pavel Vojtíšek
27 Jul	Dutch Open; Hilversum, The Netherlands; Clay – $174,000 – 32S/16D; Singles – Doubles	(Czechoslovakia) Miloslav Mečíř; 6–4, 1–6, 6–3, 6–2	(Argentina) Guillermo Pérez Roldán	(Argentina) Eduardo Bengoechea (Argentina) Martín Jaite	(Austria) Horst Skoff (West Germany) Carl-Uwe Steeb (Austria) Thomas Muster (Soviet Union) Andrei Chesnokov
27 Jul	Dutch Open; Hilversum, The Netherlands; Clay – $174,000 – 32S/16D; Singles – Doubles	(Poland) Wojciech Fibak (Czechoslovakia) Miloslav Mečíř; 7–6, 5–7, 6–2	(Netherlands) Tom Nijssen (Netherlands) Johan Vekemans	(Argentina) Eduardo Bengoechea (Argentina) Martín Jaite	(Austria) Horst Skoff (West Germany) Carl-Uwe Steeb (Austria) Thomas Muster (Soviet Union) Andrei Chesnokov

=== August ===
Week	Tournament	Champions	Runners-up	Semifinalists	Quarterfinalists
3 Aug
3 Aug	Head Cup; Kitzbühel, Austria; Clay – $202,500 – 64S/32D; Singles – Doubles	(Spain) Emilio Sánchez; 6–4, 6–1, 4–6, 6–1	(Czechoslovakia) Miloslav Mečíř	(Australia) Darren Cahill (West Germany) Tore Meinecke	(Haiti) Ronald Agénor (West Germany) Ricki Osterthun (Argentina) Guillermo Pérez Roldán (Peru) Pablo Arraya
3 Aug	Head Cup; Kitzbühel, Austria; Clay – $202,500 – 64S/32D; Singles – Doubles	(Spain) Sergio Casal (Spain) Emilio Sánchez; 7–6, 7–6	(Czechoslovakia) Miloslav Mečíř (Czechoslovakia) Tomáš Šmíd	(Australia) Darren Cahill (West Germany) Tore Meinecke	(Haiti) Ronald Agénor (West Germany) Ricki Osterthun (Argentina) Guillermo Pérez Roldán (Peru) Pablo Arraya
3 Aug	Volvo International; Stratton Mountain, US; Hard – $315,000; Singles – Doubles	No winner	(Czechoslovakia) Ivan Lendl (United States) John McEnroe; 6-7^{(3–7)}, 4-1 unfinished	(United States) Andre Agassi (South Africa) Christo van Rensburg	(United States) Kelly Jones (United States) Joey Rive (United States) Brad Gilbert (South Africa) Danie Visser
3 Aug	Volvo International; Stratton Mountain, US; Hard – $315,000; Singles – Doubles	(United States) Paul Annacone (South Africa) Christo van Rensburg	(United States) Ken Flach (United States) Robert Seguso	(United States) Andre Agassi (South Africa) Christo van Rensburg	(United States) Kelly Jones (United States) Joey Rive (United States) Brad Gilbert (South Africa) Danie Visser
10 Aug	Cedok Open; Prague, Czechoslovakia; Clay – $174,000 – 32S/16D	(Czechoslovakia) Marián Vajda; 6–1, 6–3	(Czechoslovakia) Tomáš Šmíd	(Czechoslovakia) Jaroslav Navrátil (Argentina) Guillermo Vilas	(West Germany) Wolfgang Popp (Austria) Thomas Muster (Czechoslovakia) Karel Nováček (Czechoslovakia) Petr Korda
10 Aug	Cedok Open; Prague, Czechoslovakia; Clay – $174,000 – 32S/16D	(Czechoslovakia) Miloslav Mečíř (Czechoslovakia) Tomáš Šmíd; 6–3, 6–7, 6–3	(Czechoslovakia) Stanislav Birner (Czechoslovakia) Jaroslav Navrátil	(Czechoslovakia) Jaroslav Navrátil (Argentina) Guillermo Vilas	(West Germany) Wolfgang Popp (Austria) Thomas Muster (Czechoslovakia) Karel Nováček (Czechoslovakia) Petr Korda
10 Aug	Canadian Open; Montreal, Canada; Hard – $375,000; Singles – Doubles	(Czechoslovakia) Ivan Lendl; 6–4, 7–6^{(7–2)}	(Sweden) Stefan Edberg	(United States) Jimmy Connors (West Germany) Boris Becker	(Socialist Federal Republic of Yugoslavia) Slobodan Živojinović (United States) John McEnroe (Sweden) Peter Lundgren (United States) Kevin Curren
10 Aug	Canadian Open; Montreal, Canada; Hard – $375,000; Singles – Doubles	(Australia) Pat Cash (Sweden) Stefan Edberg; 6–7, 6–3, 6–4	(Australia) Peter Doohan (Australia) Laurie Warder	(United States) Jimmy Connors (West Germany) Boris Becker	(Socialist Federal Republic of Yugoslavia) Slobodan Živojinović (United States) John McEnroe (Sweden) Peter Lundgren (United States) Kevin Curren
10 Aug	Campionati Internazionali della Valle D'Aosta; Saint Vincent, Italy; Clay – $117,000 – 32S/16D	(Chile) Pedro Rebolledo; 7–6, 4–6, 6–3	(Italy) Francesco Cancellotti	(Italy) Paolo Canè (Italy) Claudio Pistolesi	(Sweden) Kent Carlsson (Italy) Simone Colombo (Australia) Paul McNamee (Argentina) Christian Miniussi
10 Aug	Campionati Internazionali della Valle D'Aosta; Saint Vincent, Italy; Clay – $117,000 – 32S/16D	(United States) Bud Cox (Australia) Michael Fancutt; 6–3, 6–4	(Italy) Massimo Cierro (Italy) Alessandro de Minicis	(Italy) Paolo Canè (Italy) Claudio Pistolesi	(Sweden) Kent Carlsson (Italy) Simone Colombo (Australia) Paul McNamee (Argentina) Christian Miniussi
17 Aug	Cincinnati Open; Mason, US; Hard – $375,000 – 64S/32D	(Sweden) Stefan Edberg; 6–4, 6–1	(West Germany) Boris Becker	(Sweden) Anders Järryd (United States) Jimmy Connors	(Sweden) Peter Lundgren (Sweden) Mikael Pernfors (Nigeria) Nduka Odizor (United States) Brad Gilbert
17 Aug	Cincinnati Open; Mason, US; Hard – $375,000 – 64S/32D	(United States) Ken Flach (United States) Robert Seguso; 7–5, 6–3	(United States) Steve Denton (Australia) John Fitzgerald	(Sweden) Anders Järryd (United States) Jimmy Connors	(Sweden) Peter Lundgren (Sweden) Mikael Pernfors (Nigeria) Nduka Odizor (United States) Brad Gilbert
24 Aug	Rye Brook Open; Rye Brook, New York, US; Hard – $89,400 – 32S/16D; Singles – Doubles	(Sweden) Peter Lundgren; 6–7^{(4–7)}, 7–5, 6–3	(United States) John Ross	(United States) Richard Matuszewski (India) Ramesh Krishnan	(United States) Marc Flur (Austria) Thomas Muster (Spain) Javier Sánchez (United States) Marty Davis
24 Aug	Rye Brook Open; Rye Brook, New York, US; Hard – $89,400 – 32S/16D; Singles – Doubles	(United States) Lloyd Bourne (United States) Jeff Klaparda; 6–3, 6–2	(Australia) Carl Limberger (Australia) Mark Woodforde	(United States) Richard Matuszewski (India) Ramesh Krishnan	(United States) Marc Flur (Austria) Thomas Muster (Spain) Javier Sánchez (United States) Marty Davis
31 Aug; 7 Sep	US Open; Flushing Meadow, New York; Grand Slam; Hard – $1,666,667 – 128S/64D/32XD; Singles – Doubles – Mixed doubles	(Czechoslovakia) Ivan Lendl; 6–7^{(7–9)}, 6–0, 7–6^{(7–4)}, 6–4	(Sweden) Mats Wilander	(United States) Jimmy Connors (Sweden) Stefan Edberg	(United States) John McEnroe (United States) Brad Gilbert (Czechoslovakia) Miloslav Mečíř (India) Ramesh Krishnan
31 Aug; 7 Sep	US Open; Flushing Meadow, New York; Grand Slam; Hard – $1,666,667 – 128S/64D/32XD; Singles – Doubles – Mixed doubles	(Sweden) Stefan Edberg (Sweden) Anders Järryd; 7–6^{(7–1)}, 6–2, 4–6, 5–7, 7–6^{(7–2)}	(United States) Ken Flach (United States) Robert Seguso	(United States) Jimmy Connors (Sweden) Stefan Edberg	(United States) John McEnroe (United States) Brad Gilbert (Czechoslovakia) Miloslav Mečíř (India) Ramesh Krishnan
31 Aug; 7 Sep	US Open; Flushing Meadow, New York; Grand Slam; Hard – $1,666,667 – 128S/64D/32XD; Singles – Doubles – Mixed doubles	(Spain) Emilio Sánchez (United States) Martina Navratilova; 6–4, 6–7^{(6–8)}, 7–6^{(14–12)}	(United States) Paul Annacone (United States) Betsy Nagelsen	(United States) Jimmy Connors (Sweden) Stefan Edberg	(United States) John McEnroe (United States) Brad Gilbert (Czechoslovakia) Miloslav Mečíř (India) Ramesh Krishnan

=== September ===
Week	Tournament	Champions	Runners-up	Semifinalists	Quarterfinalists
14 Sep	Geneva Open; Geneva, Switzerland; Clay – $231,000 – 32S/16D; Singles – Doubles	(Switzerland) Claudio Mezzadri; 6–4, 7–5	(Czechoslovakia) Tomáš Šmíd	(Ecuador) Andrés Gómez (Sweden) Ulf Stenlund	(France) Thierry Tulasne (Argentina) Guillermo Pérez Roldán (Argentina) Horacio de la Peña (Switzerland) Roland Stadler
14 Sep	Geneva Open; Geneva, Switzerland; Clay – $231,000 – 32S/16D; Singles – Doubles	(Brazil) Ricardo Acioly (Brazil) Luiz Mattar; 3–6, 6–4, 6–2	(Iran) Mansour Bahrami (Uruguay) Diego Pérez	(Ecuador) Andrés Gómez (Sweden) Ulf Stenlund	(France) Thierry Tulasne (Argentina) Guillermo Pérez Roldán (Argentina) Horacio de la Peña (Switzerland) Roland Stadler
14 Sep	Madrid Tennis Grand Prix; Madrid, Spain; Clay – $89,400 – 32S/16D; Singles – Doubles	(Spain) Emilio Sánchez; 6–3, 3–6, 6–2	(Spain) Javier Sánchez	(Argentina) Franco Davín (Sweden) Jörgen Windahl	(Spain) Juan Aguilera (Spain) Jorge Bardou (Chile) Pedro Rebolledo (Sweden) Christian Bergström
14 Sep	Madrid Tennis Grand Prix; Madrid, Spain; Clay – $89,400 – 32S/16D; Singles – Doubles	(Peru) Carlos di Laura (Spain) Javier Sánchez; 6–3, 3–6, 6–4	(Spain) Sergio Casal (Spain) Emilio Sánchez	(Argentina) Franco Davín (Sweden) Jörgen Windahl	(Spain) Juan Aguilera (Spain) Jorge Bardou (Chile) Pedro Rebolledo (Sweden) Christian Bergström
21 Sep	Volvo Tennis Los Angeles; Los Angeles, US; Hard – $315,000 – 32S/16D; Singles – Doubles	(United States) David Pate; 6–4, 6–4	(Sweden) Stefan Edberg	(United States) Tim Wilkison (United States) Brad Gilbert	(United States) Paul Annacone (United States) Marty Davis (United States) Andre Agassi (United States) Eliot Teltscher
21 Sep	Volvo Tennis Los Angeles; Los Angeles, US; Hard – $315,000 – 32S/16D; Singles – Doubles	(United States) Kevin Curren (United States) David Pate; 6–3, 6–4	(United States) Brad Gilbert (United States) Tim Wilkison	(United States) Tim Wilkison (United States) Brad Gilbert	(United States) Paul Annacone (United States) Marty Davis (United States) Andre Agassi (United States) Eliot Teltscher
21 Sep	Torneo Godó; Barcelona, Spain; Clay – $250,000 – 64S/32D; Singles – Doubles	(Argentina) Martín Jaite; 7–6^{(7–5)}, 6–4, 4–6, 0–6, 6–4	(Sweden) Mats Wilander	(Argentina) Guillermo Pérez Roldán (Argentina) Eduardo Bengoechea	(Spain) Tomás Carbonell (Ecuador) Andrés Gómez (Spain) Emilio Sánchez (Czechoslovakia) Miloslav Mečíř
21 Sep	Torneo Godó; Barcelona, Spain; Clay – $250,000 – 64S/32D; Singles – Doubles	(Czechoslovakia) Miloslav Mečíř (Czechoslovakia) Tomáš Šmíd; 6–1, 6–2	(Argentina) Javier Frana (Argentina) Christian Miniussi	(Argentina) Guillermo Pérez Roldán (Argentina) Eduardo Bengoechea	(Spain) Tomás Carbonell (Ecuador) Andrés Gómez (Spain) Emilio Sánchez (Czechoslovakia) Miloslav Mečíř
28 Sep	Campionati Internazionali di Sicilia; Palermo, Sicily, Italy; Clay – $100,000 – 32S/16D; Singles – Doubles	(Argentina) Martín Jaite; 7–6^{(7–5)}, 6–7^{(7–9)}, 6–4	(Czechoslovakia) Karel Nováček	(Czechoslovakia) Josef Čihák (West Germany) Damir Keretić	(United States) Lawson Duncan (Argentina) Christian Miniussi (United States) Jimmy Brown (Spain) Jordi Arrese
28 Sep	Campionati Internazionali di Sicilia; Palermo, Sicily, Italy; Clay – $100,000 – 32S/16D; Singles – Doubles	(Mexico) Leonardo Lavalle (Italy) Claudio Panatta; 3–6, 6–4, 6–4	(Czechoslovakia) Petr Korda (Czechoslovakia) Tomáš Šmíd	(Czechoslovakia) Josef Čihák (West Germany) Damir Keretić	(United States) Lawson Duncan (Argentina) Christian Miniussi (United States) Jimmy Brown (Spain) Jordi Arrese
28 Sep	Transamerica Open; San Francisco, California, US; Carpet – $293,000 – 32S/16D; Singles – Doubles	(Sweden) Peter Lundgren; 6–1, 7–5	(United States) Jim Pugh	(Czechoslovakia) Ivan Lendl (United States) Todd Nelson	(United States) Dan Goldie (United States) Tim Wilkison (United States) Eliot Teltscher (United States) Sammy Giammalva
28 Sep	Transamerica Open; San Francisco, California, US; Carpet – $293,000 – 32S/16D; Singles – Doubles	(United States) Jim Grabb (United States) Patrick McEnroe; 6–2, 0–6, 6–4	(United States) Glenn Layendecker (United States) Todd Witsken	(Czechoslovakia) Ivan Lendl (United States) Todd Nelson	(United States) Dan Goldie (United States) Tim Wilkison (United States) Eliot Teltscher (United States) Sammy Giammalva
28 Sep	Davis Cup: Semifinals; Barcelona, Spain – clay Sydney, Australia – grass	Semifinal winners Sweden 3–2; India 3–2	Semifinal losers Spain; Australia		

=== October ===
Week	Tournament	Champions	Runners-up	Semifinalists	Quarterfinalists
5 Oct	WCT Scottsdale Open; Scottsdale, Arizona, US; Hard – $304,400 – 32S/16D; Singles – Doubles	(United States) Brad Gilbert; 6–2, 6–2	(United States) Eliot Teltscher	(United States) David Pate (United States) Michael Chang	(Sweden) Peter Lundgren (United States) Kevin Curren (United States) Johan Kriek (Mexico) Jorge Lozano
5 Oct	WCT Scottsdale Open; Scottsdale, Arizona, US; Hard – $304,400 – 32S/16D; Singles – Doubles	(United States) Rick Leach (United States) Jim Pugh; 6–3, 6–3	(United States) Dan Goldie (United States) Mel Purcell	(United States) David Pate (United States) Michael Chang	(Sweden) Peter Lundgren (United States) Kevin Curren (United States) Johan Kriek (Mexico) Jorge Lozano
5 Oct	Swiss Indoors; Basel, Switzerland, Hard – $239,000 – 32S/16D; Singles – Doubles	(France) Yannick Noah; 7–6^{(8–6)}, 6–4, 6–4	(Haiti) Ronald Agénor	(France) Guy Forget (United States) Andre Agassi	(Austria) Horst Skoff (Socialist Federal Republic of Yugoslavia) Slobodan Živojinović (Czechoslovakia) Jaroslav Navrátil (West Germany) Patrik Kühnen
5 Oct	Swiss Indoors; Basel, Switzerland, Hard – $239,000 – 32S/16D; Singles – Doubles	(Sweden) Anders Järryd (Czechoslovakia) Tomáš Šmíd; 6–4, 6–3	(Czechoslovakia) Stanislav Birner (Czechoslovakia) Jaroslav Navrátil	(France) Guy Forget (United States) Andre Agassi	(Austria) Horst Skoff (Socialist Federal Republic of Yugoslavia) Slobodan Živojinović (Czechoslovakia) Jaroslav Navrátil (West Germany) Patrik Kühnen
5 Oct	Brisbane, Australia; Hard – $150,000	(New Zealand) Kelly Evernden; 3–6, 6–1, 6–1	(West Germany) Eric Jelen	(Australia) John Frawley (United States) Marcel Freeman	(Australia) Pat Cash (India) Ramesh Krishnan (Australia) Broderick Dyke (Australia) John Fitzgerald
5 Oct	Brisbane, Australia; Hard – $150,000	(United States) Matt Anger (New Zealand) Kelly Evernden; 7–6, 6–2	(Australia) Broderick Dyke (Australia) Wally Masur	(Australia) John Frawley (United States) Marcel Freeman	(Australia) Pat Cash (India) Ramesh Krishnan (Australia) Broderick Dyke (Australia) John Fitzgerald
12 Oct
12 Oct	Grand Prix de Tennis de Toulouse; Toulouse, France; Carpet – $175,000 – 32S/16D; Singles – Doubles	(United States) Tim Mayotte; 6–2, 5–7, 6–4	(West Germany) Ricki Osterthun	(Switzerland) Jakob Hlasek (United States) Tim Wilkison	(Switzerland) Claudio Mezzadri (West Germany) Patrik Kühnen (France) Jérôme Potier (Brazil) Luiz Mattar
12 Oct	Grand Prix de Tennis de Toulouse; Toulouse, France; Carpet – $175,000 – 32S/16D; Singles – Doubles	(Poland) Wojciech Fibak (Netherlands) Michiel Schapers; 6–2, 6–4	(United States) Kelly Jones (West Germany) Patrik Kühnen	(Switzerland) Jakob Hlasek (United States) Tim Wilkison	(Switzerland) Claudio Mezzadri (West Germany) Patrik Kühnen (France) Jérôme Potier (Brazil) Luiz Mattar
12 Oct	Sydney Indoor; Sydney, Australia; Hard – $345,000; Singles – Doubles	(Czechoslovakia) Ivan Lendl; 6–4, 6–2, 6–4	(Australia) Pat Cash	(Socialist Federal Republic of Yugoslavia) Slobodan Živojinović (West Germany) Boris Becker	(India) Ramesh Krishnan (United States) Marty Davis (United States) Scott Davis (United States) Paul Annacone
12 Oct	Sydney Indoor; Sydney, Australia; Hard – $345,000; Singles – Doubles	(Australia) Darren Cahill (Australia) Mark Kratzmann; 6–3, 6–3	(West Germany) Boris Becker (United States) Robert Seguso	(Socialist Federal Republic of Yugoslavia) Slobodan Živojinović (West Germany) Boris Becker	(India) Ramesh Krishnan (United States) Marty Davis (United States) Scott Davis (United States) Paul Annacone
12 Oct	Tel Aviv Open; Tel Aviv, Israel; Hard – $89,400 – 32S/16D; Singles – Doubles	(Israel) Amos Mansdorf; 3–6, 6–3, 6–4	(United States) Brad Gilbert	(United States) Jimmy Connors (Sweden) Peter Lundgren	(Netherlands) Huub van Boeckel (West Germany) Wolfgang Popp (South Africa) Craig Campbell (Israel) Gilad Bloom
12 Oct	Tel Aviv Open; Tel Aviv, Israel; Hard – $89,400 – 32S/16D; Singles – Doubles	(Israel) Gilad Bloom (Israel) Shahar Perkiss; 6–2, 6–4	(West Germany) Wolfgang Popp (Netherlands) Huub van Boeckel	(United States) Jimmy Connors (Sweden) Peter Lundgren	(Netherlands) Huub van Boeckel (West Germany) Wolfgang Popp (South Africa) Craig Campbell (Israel) Gilad Bloom
20 Oct	Tokyo Indoor; Tokyo, Japan; Carpet – $375,000 – 32S/16D; Singles – Doubles	(Sweden) Stefan Edberg; 6–7^{(4–7)}, 6–4, 6–4	(Czechoslovakia) Ivan Lendl	(Sweden) Mikael Pernfors (Socialist Federal Republic of Yugoslavia) Slobodan Živojinović	(West Germany) Eric Jelen (Australia) John Fitzgerald (West Germany) Boris Becker (United States) Paul Annacone
20 Oct	Tokyo Indoor; Tokyo, Japan; Carpet – $375,000 – 32S/16D; Singles – Doubles	(Australia) Broderick Dyke (Netherlands) Tom Nijssen; 6–3, 6–2	(United States) Sammy Giammalva (United States) Jim Grabb	(Sweden) Mikael Pernfors (Socialist Federal Republic of Yugoslavia) Slobodan Živojinović	(West Germany) Eric Jelen (Australia) John Fitzgerald (West Germany) Boris Becker (United States) Paul Annacone
20 Oct	C.A. Tennis Trophy; Vienna, Austria $125,000 – 32S/16D; Singles – Doubles	(Sweden) Jonas Svensson; 1–6, 1–6, 6–2, 6–3, 7–5	(Israel) Amos Mansdorf	(Switzerland) Claudio Mezzadri (Austria) Thomas Muster	(United States) Tim Mayotte (Czechoslovakia) Milan Šrejber (Sweden) Anders Järryd (Spain) Emilio Sánchez
20 Oct	C.A. Tennis Trophy; Vienna, Austria $125,000 – 32S/16D; Singles – Doubles	(United States) Mel Purcell (United States) Tim Wilkison; 6–3 7–5	(Spain) Emilio Sánchez (Spain) Javier Sánchez	(Switzerland) Claudio Mezzadri (Austria) Thomas Muster	(United States) Tim Mayotte (Czechoslovakia) Milan Šrejber (Sweden) Anders Järryd (Spain) Emilio Sánchez
26 Oct	Seiko Super Tennis Hong Kong; Hong Kong; Hard – $200,000 – 32S/16D; Singles – Doubles	(United States) Eliot Teltscher; 6–7^{(6–8)}, 3–6, 6–1, 6–2, 7–5	(Australia) John Fitzgerald	(United Kingdom) Jeremy Bates (Australia) Darren Cahill	(Netherlands) Tom Nijssen (West Germany) Christian Saceanu (United States) Rick Leach (United States) John Ross
26 Oct	Seiko Super Tennis Hong Kong; Hong Kong; Hard – $200,000 – 32S/16D; Singles – Doubles	(Australia) Mark Kratzmann (United States) Jim Pugh; 6–7, 6–4, 6–2	(United States) Marty Davis (Australia) Brad Drewett	(United Kingdom) Jeremy Bates (Australia) Darren Cahill	(Netherlands) Tom Nijssen (West Germany) Christian Saceanu (United States) Rick Leach (United States) John Ross

=== November ===
Week	Tournament	Champions	Runners-up	Semifinalists	Quarterfinalists
2 Nov	Paris Open; Paris, France; Carpet (i) – $840,000 – 32S/16D	(United States) Tim Mayotte; 2–6, 6–3, 7–5, 6–7^{(5–7)}, 6–3	(United States) Brad Gilbert	(Netherlands) Michiel Schapers (France) Henri Leconte	(United States) Kevin Curren (Israel) Amos Mansdorf (France) Yannick Noah (Australia) Pat Cash
2 Nov	Paris Open; Paris, France; Carpet (i) – $840,000 – 32S/16D	(Switzerland) Jakob Hlasek (Switzerland) Claudio Mezzadri; 7–6, 6–2	(United States) Scott Davis (United States) David Pate	(Netherlands) Michiel Schapers (France) Henri Leconte	(United States) Kevin Curren (Israel) Amos Mansdorf (France) Yannick Noah (Australia) Pat Cash
2 Nov	Stockholm Open; Stockholm, Sweden; Hard (i) – $525,000 – 56S/28D; Singles – Doubles	(Sweden) Stefan Edberg; 7–5, 6–2, 4–6, 6–4	(Sweden) Jonas Svensson	(Sweden) Anders Järryd (Sweden) Magnus Gustafsson	(Sweden) Peter Lundgren (Canada) Martin Laurendeau (United States) Matt Anger (United States) Jim Grabb
2 Nov	Stockholm Open; Stockholm, Sweden; Hard (i) – $525,000 – 56S/28D; Singles – Doubles	(Sweden) Stefan Edberg (Sweden) Anders Järryd; 6–3, 6–4	(United States) Jim Grabb (United States) Jim Pugh	(Sweden) Anders Järryd (Sweden) Magnus Gustafsson	(Sweden) Peter Lundgren (Canada) Martin Laurendeau (United States) Matt Anger (United States) Jim Grabb
9 Nov	Ford Cup; São Paulo, Brazil; Hard – $89,400 – 32S/16D	(Peru) Jaime Yzaga; 6–2, 4–6, 6–2	(Brazil) Luiz Mattar	(United States) Dan Cassidy (United States) Jay Berger	(United States) Jim Gurfein (Uruguay) Marcelo Filippini (Argentina) Roberto Saad (West Germany) Tore Meinecke
9 Nov	Ford Cup; São Paulo, Brazil; Hard – $89,400 – 32S/16D	(Israel) Gilad Bloom (Spain) Javier Sánchez; 6–3, 6–7^{(5–7)}, 6–4	(Spain) Sergio Casal (Spain) Tomás Carbonell	(United States) Dan Cassidy (United States) Jay Berger	(United States) Jim Gurfein (Uruguay) Marcelo Filippini (Argentina) Roberto Saad (West Germany) Tore Meinecke
9 Nov	Frankfurt Cup; Frankfurt, West Germany; Carpet (i) – $174,000 – 32S/16D	(United States) Tim Mayotte; 7–6^{(8–6)}, 6–4	(Ecuador) Andrés Gómez	(United States) Derrick Rostagno (United States) Jim Pugh	(Sweden) Niclas Kroon (United States) Dan Goldie (United States) Brad Gilbert (Czechoslovakia) Libor Pimek
9 Nov	Frankfurt Cup; Frankfurt, West Germany; Carpet (i) – $174,000 – 32S/16D	(West Germany) Boris Becker (West Germany) Patrik Kühnen; 6–4, 6–2	(United States) Scott Davis (United States) David Pate	(United States) Derrick Rostagno (United States) Jim Pugh	(Sweden) Niclas Kroon (United States) Dan Goldie (United States) Brad Gilbert (Czechoslovakia) Libor Pimek
9 Nov	Benson and Hedges Championships; London, Great Britain; Carpet (i) – $465,000 – 32S/16D	(Czechoslovakia) Ivan Lendl; 6–3, 6–2, 7–5	(Sweden) Anders Järryd	(France) Henri Leconte (Switzerland) Jakob Hlasek	(United States) Paul Annacone (Israel) Amos Mansdorf (Australia) Pat Cash (Czechoslovakia) Miloslav Mečíř
9 Nov	Benson and Hedges Championships; London, Great Britain; Carpet (i) – $465,000 – 32S/16D	(Czechoslovakia) Miloslav Mečíř (Czechoslovakia) Tomáš Šmíd; 7–5, 6–4	(United States) Ken Flach (United States) Robert Seguso	(France) Henri Leconte (Switzerland) Jakob Hlasek	(United States) Paul Annacone (Israel) Amos Mansdorf (Australia) Pat Cash (Czechoslovakia) Miloslav Mečíř
16 Nov	Argentine Open; Buenos Aires, Argentina; Clay – $89,400 – 32S/16D	(Argentina) Guillermo Pérez Roldán; 3–2, ret.	(United States) Jay Berger	(Peru) Pablo Arraya (Spain) Juan Aguilera	(Argentina) Martín Jaite (Argentina) Horacio de la Peña (Argentina) Gustavo Garetto (Brazil) Cássio Motta
16 Nov	Argentine Open; Buenos Aires, Argentina; Clay – $89,400 – 32S/16D	(Spain) Sergio Casal (Spain) Tomás Carbonell; Walkover	(United States) Jay Berger (Argentina) Horacio de la Peña	(Peru) Pablo Arraya (Spain) Juan Aguilera	(Argentina) Martín Jaite (Argentina) Horacio de la Peña (Argentina) Gustavo Garetto (Brazil) Cássio Motta
16 Nov	South African Open; Johannesburg, South Africa; Hard – $389,400 – 32S/16D	(Australia) Pat Cash; 7–6^{(9–7)}, 4–6, 2–6, 6–0, 6–1	(United States) Brad Gilbert	(Israel) Amos Mansdorf (Ecuador) Andrés Gómez	(United States) Kevin Curren (Italy) Francesco Cancellotti (Switzerland) Jakob Hlasek (South Africa) Gary Muller
16 Nov	South African Open; Johannesburg, South Africa; Hard – $389,400 – 32S/16D	(United States) Kevin Curren (United States) David Pate; 6–4, 6–4	(United States) Eric Korita (United States) Brad Pearce	(Israel) Amos Mansdorf (Ecuador) Andrés Gómez	(United States) Kevin Curren (Italy) Francesco Cancellotti (Switzerland) Jakob Hlasek (South Africa) Gary Muller
23 Nov	Sul America Open; Itaparica, Brazil; Hard – $516,000 – 32S/16D	(United States) Andre Agassi; 7–6^{(8–6)}, 6–2	(Brazil) Luiz Mattar	(Czechoslovakia) Tomáš Šmíd (Argentina) Martín Jaite	(Ecuador) Andrés Gómez (Spain) Sergio Casal (West Germany) Tore Meinecke (United States) Brad Gilbert
23 Nov	Sul America Open; Itaparica, Brazil; Hard – $516,000 – 32S/16D	(Spain) Sergio Casal (Spain) Emilio Sánchez; 6–2, 6–2	(Mexico) Jorge Lozano (Uruguay) Diego Pérez	(Czechoslovakia) Tomáš Šmíd (Argentina) Martín Jaite	(Ecuador) Andrés Gómez (Spain) Sergio Casal (West Germany) Tore Meinecke (United States) Brad Gilbert
30 Nov	Nabisco Masters Singles; New York City, United States; Carpet – $500,000 – 8S	(Czechoslovakia) Ivan Lendl; 6–2, 6–2, 6–3	(Sweden) Mats Wilander	(United States) Brad Gilbert (Sweden) Stefan Edberg	(round robin losers) (West Germany) Boris Becker (Australia) Pat Cash (United States) Jimmy Connors (Czechoslovakia) Miloslav Mečíř

=== December ===
Week	Tournament	Champions	Runners-up	Semifinalists	Quarterfinalists
7 Dec	Nabisco Masters Doubles; London, United Kingdom; Carpet – $200,000 – 8D	(Czechoslovakia) Miloslav Mečíř (Czechoslovakia) Tomáš Šmíd; 6–4, 7–5, 6–7^{(5–7)}, 6–3	(United States) Ken Flach (United States) Robert Seguso	(Spain) Casal / (Spain) Sánchez (Sweden) Edberg / (Sweden) Järryd	Round robin (Australia) Doohan / (Australia) Warder (United States) Annacone / (South Africa) Rensburg (United States) Donnelly / (United States) Fleming (United States) Davis / (United States) Pate
14 Dec	Davis Cup: Final; Gothenburg, Sweden – Clay (i)	Sweden; 5–0	India		

== Grand Prix rankings ==
As of 1 January 1987
Rk	Name	Nation
1	Ivan Lendl	TCH
2	Boris Becker	FRG
3	Mats Wilander	SWE
4	Yannick Noah	FRA
5	Stefan Edberg	SWE
6	Henri Leconte	FRA
7	Joakim Nyström	SWE
8	Jimmy Connors	USA
9	Miloslav Mečíř	TCH
10	Andrés Gómez	ECU
11	Brad Gilbert	USA
12	Mikael Pernfors	SWE
13	Kent Carlsson	SWE
14	John McEnroe	USA
15	Tim Mayotte	USA
16	Emilio Sánchez	ESP
17	Martín Jaite	ARG
18	Kevin Curren	USA
19	Anders Järryd	SWE
20	Thierry Tulasne	FRA

Year-end rankings 1987 (28 December 1987)
Rk	Name	Nation	Points	High	Low	Change
1	Ivan Lendl	TCH				=
2	Stefan Edberg	SWE				▲ +3
3	Mats Wilander	SWE				=
4	Jimmy Connors	USA				▲ +4
5	Boris Becker	FRG				▼ –3
6	Miloslav Mečíř	TCH				▲ +3
7	Pat Cash	AUS				▲ +17
8	Yannick Noah	FRA				▼ –4
9	Tim Mayotte	USA				▲ +6
10	John McEnroe	USA				▲ +4
11	Andrés Gómez	ECU				▼ –1
12	Kent Carlsson	SWE				▲ +1
13	Brad Gilbert	USA				▼ –2
14	Martín Jaite	ARG				▲ +3
15	Anders Järryd	SWE				▲ +4
16	Joakim Nyström	SWE				▼ –9
17	Emilio Sánchez	ESP				▼ –1
18	David Pate	USA				▲ +12
19	Guillermo Pérez Roldán	ARG				▲ +90
20	Eliot Teltscher	USA				▲ +33

== List of tournament winners ==
The list of winners and number of Grand Prix singles titles won, alphabetically by last name:

- (United States) Andre Agassi (1) Itaparica
- (West Germany) Boris Becker (3) Indian Wells, Milan, Queen's Club
- (Sweden) Kent Carlsson (2) Nice, Bologna
- (Australia) Pat Cash (3) Nancy, Wimbledon, Johannesburg
- (Soviet Union) Andrei Chesnokov (1) Florence
- (Sweden) Stefan Edberg (7) Australian Open, Memphis, Rotterdam, Tokyo Outdoor, Cincinnati, Tokyo Indoor, Stockholm
- (Australia) Kelly Evernden (2) Bristol, Brisbane
- (United States) Brad Gilbert (1) Scottsdale
- (United States) Dan Goldie (1) Newport
- (Ecuador) Andrés Gómez (1) Forest Hills
- (United States) Jim Grabb (1) Seoul
- (Argentina) Martín Jaite (1) Palermo
- (United States) Johan Kriek (1) Livingston
- (Czechoslovakia) Ivan Lendl (8) Hamburg, French Open, Washington, D.C., Montreal, US Open, Sydney Indoor, Wembley, Masters
- (Sweden) Peter Lundgren (2) Rye Brook, San Francisco
- (Israel) Amos Mansdorf (1) Tel Aviv
- (Australia) Wally Masur (1) Adelaide
- (Brazil) Luiz Mattar (1) Guarujá
- (United States) Tim Mayotte (5) Philadelphia, Chicago, Toulouse, Bercy, Frankfurt
- (Czechoslovakia) Miloslav Mečíř (6) Auckland, Sydney Outdoor, Key Biscayne, Dallas WCT, Stuttgart Outdoor, Hilversum
- (Switzerland) Claudio Mezzadri (1) Geneva
- (France) Yannick Noah (2) Lyon, Basel
- (Sweden) Joakim Nyström (1) Båstad
- (Argentina) Guillermo Pérez Roldán (3) Munich, Athens, Buenos Aires
- (Italy) Claudio Pistolesi (1) Bari
- (Chile) Pedro Rebolledo (1) St. Vincent
- (Spain) Emilio Sánchez (4) Gstaad, Bordeaux, Kitzbühel, Madrid
- (Sweden) Jonas Svensson (1) Vienna
- (United States) Eliot Teltscher (1) Hong Kong
- (Czechoslovakia) Marián Vajda (1) Prague
- (South Africa) Christo van Rensburg (1) Orlando
- (Sweden) Mats Wilander (5) Brussels, Monte Carlo, Rome, Boston, Indianapolis
- (Peru) Jaime Yzaga (2) Schenectady, São Paulo

The following players won their first title in 1987:

- (United States) Andre Agassi Itaparica
- (Soviet Union) Andrei Chesnokov Florence
- (Australia) Kelly Evernden Bristol
- (United States) Dan Goldie Newport
- (United States) Jim Grabb Seoul
- (Brazil) Luiz Mattar Guarujá
- (Switzerland) Claudio Mezzadri Geneva
- (Italy) Claudio Pistolesi Bari
- (Czechoslovakia) Marián Vajda Prague
- (South Africa) Christo van Rensburg Orlando
- (Peru) Jaime Yzaga Schenectady

== See also ==
- 1987 Virginia Slims World Championship Series
