= 1991 Rado Swiss Open =

- Date: 8–14 July
- Edition: 46th
- Category: World Series
- Draw: 32S / 16D
- Prize money: $275,000
- Surface: Clay / outdoor
- Location: Gstaad, Switzerland
- Venue: Roy Emerson Arena

Champions

Singles
- (Spain) Emilio Sánchez

Doubles
- (South Africa) Gary Muller / (South Africa) Danie Visser
- Suisse Open Gstaad

The 1991 Rado Swiss Open, also known as Suisse Open Gstaad, was an men's professional tennis tournament played on outdoor clay courts at the Roy Emerson Arena in Gstaad, Switzerland that was part of the World Series category of the 1991 ATP Tour. It was the 46th edition of the tournament and was held from 8 July until 14 July 1991. Fifth-seeded Emilio Sánchez won the singles title, his second at the event after 1987.

== Finals ==
=== Singles ===
(Spain) Emilio Sánchez defeated (Spain) Sergi Bruguera 6–1, 6–4, 6–4

- It was Sánchez's 3rd and last singles title of the year and the 14th of his career.

=== Doubles ===
(South Africa) Gary Muller / (South Africa) Danie Visser defeated (France) Guy Forget / (Switzerland) Jakob Hlasek 7–6, 6–4

- It was Mullers' 1st doubles title of the year and the 4th of his career. It was Visser's only doubles title of the year and the 11th of his career.
