= 1987 Torneo Internazionale Città di Firenze =

- Date: 18–24 May
- Edition: 15th
- Category: Grand Prix
- Draw: 32S / 16D
- Prize money: $89,400
- Surface: Clay / outdoor
- Location: Florence, Italy

Champions

Singles
- (Soviet Union) Andrei Chesnokov

Doubles
- (West Germany) Wolfgang Popp / (West Germany) Udo Riglewski
- ATP Florence

The 1987 Torneo Internazionale Città di Firenze, also known as the Florence Open, was a men's tennis tournament played on outdoor clay courts in Florence, Italy that was part of the 1987 Nabisco Grand Prix circuit. It was the 15th edition of the tournament and was played from 18 May until 24 May 1987. Second-seeded Andrei Chesnokov, who entered the main draw on a wildcard, won the singles title.

== Finals ==
=== Singles ===
(Soviet Union) Andrei Chesnokov defeated (Italy) Alessandro de Minicis 6–1, 6–3

- It was Chesnokov's only singles title of the year and the 1st of his career.

=== Doubles ===
(West Germany) Wolfgang Popp / (West Germany) Udo Riglewski defeated (Italy) Paolo Canè / (Italy) Gianni Ocleppo 6–4, 6–4

- It was Popp's only doubles title of the year. It was Riglewski's only doubles title of the year and the 1st of his career.
