= 1987 Fila Trophy =

- Date: 30 March – 5 April
- Edition: 10th
- Category: Grand Prix
- Draw: 32S / 16D
- Prize money: $275,000
- Surface: Carpet / indoor
- Location: Milan, Italy
- Venue: Palazzo Trussardi
- Attendance: ~48,000

Champions

Singles
- (West Germany) Boris Becker

Doubles
- (West Germany) Boris Becker / (Socialist Federal Republic of Yugoslavia) Slobodan Živojinović
- Milan Indoor

The 1987 Fila Trophy was a men's professional tennis tournament played on indoor carpet courts at a new venue, Palazzo Trussardi in Milan, Italy. The event was part of the 1987 Nabisco Grand Prix. It was the tenth edition of the tournament and was played from 30 March until 4 April 1987. Total attendance was almost 48,000. First-seeded Boris Becker won the singles title and earned $55,000 first-prize money.

== Finals ==
=== Singles ===
(West Germany) Boris Becker defeated (Czechoslovakia) Miloslav Mečíř 6–4, 6–3

- It was Becker's 2nd singles title of the year and the 11th of his career.

=== Doubles ===
(West Germany) Boris Becker / (Socialist Federal Republic of Yugoslavia) Slobodan Živojinović defeated (Spain) Sergio Casal / (Spain) Emilio Sánchez 3–6, 6–3, 6–4
