= 1987 Swiss Indoors – Singles =

Singles
- 1987 Swiss Indoors

Final
- Champion: (France) Yannick Noah
- Runner-up: (Haiti) Ronald Agénor
- Score: 7–6^{(8–6)}, 6–4, 6–4

Details
- Draw: 32
- Seeds: 8

Events
Singles	Doubles
← 1986 ·	Swiss Indoors	· 1988 →

Stefan Edberg was the defending champion, but decide to rest after competing at the Davis Cup the previous week.

Yannick Noah won the title by defeating Ronald Agénor 7–6^{(8–6)}, 6–4, 6–4 in the final.

== Seeds ==
1. (France) Yannick Noah (champion)
2. (Spain) Emilio Sánchez (first round)
3. (Sweden) Anders Järryd (first round)
4. (Federal Republic of Yugoslavia) Slobodan Živojinović (quarterfinals)
5. (Israel) Amos Mansdorf (first round)
6. (France) Guy Forget (semifinals)
7. (Czechoslovakia) Tomáš Šmíd (second round)
8. (Sweden) Jonas Svensson (second round)

== Draw ==
=== Key ===
- Q = Qualifier
- WC = Wild card
- LL = Lucky loser
- Alt = Alternate
- SE = Special exempt
- PR = Protected ranking
- ITF = ITF entry
- JE = Junior exempt
- w/o = Walkover
- r = Retired
- d = Defaulted
- SR = Special ranking

=== Finals ===
Semifinals
1	(France) Yannick Noah	6	6
6	(France) Guy Forget	1	2
(United States) Andre Agassi	1	4
(Haiti) Ronald Agénor	6	6

Final
1	(France) Yannick Noah	7	6	6
(Haiti) Ronald Agénor	6	4	4

=== Top half ===
First round
1	(France) Y Noah	7	4	6
WC	(Switzerland) H Gunthardt	5	6	4
(Spain) S Casal	6	5	6
Q	(Sweden) S Eriksson	4	7	4
(Austria) H Skoff	6	4	6
(Netherlands) M Schapers	2	6	3
(Nigeria) N Odizor	4	3
8	(Sweden) J Svensson	6	6
4	(Federal Republic of Yugoslavia) S Živojinović	6	6	7
Q	(Sweden) T Hogstedt	7	4	6
WC	(Switzerland) R Stadler	7	2	3
(Uruguay) D Pérez	6	6	6
(Switzerland) C Mezzadri	6	5	7
(United States) T Wilkison	0	7	5
(Australia) C Limberger	3	2
6	(France) G Forget	6	6

Second round
1	(France) Y Noah	4	6	7
(Spain) S Casal	6	2	5
(Austria) H Skoff	4	7	6
8	(Sweden) J Svensson	6	5	1
4	(Federal Republic of Yugoslavia) S Živojinović	6	6
(Uruguay) D Pérez	2	4
(Switzerland) C Mezzadri	5	6	4
6	(France) G Forget	7	4	6

Quarterfinals
1	(France) Y Noah	6	6
(Austria) H Skoff	2	4
4	(Federal Republic of Yugoslavia) S Živojinović	7	4	4
6	(France) G Forget	5	6	6

Semifinals
1	(France) Y Noah	6	6
6	(France) G Forget	1	2

=== Bottom half ===
First round
5	(Israel) A Mansdorf	6	2	4
(Czech Republic) J Navrátil	1	6	6
(West Germany) A Maurer	3	7	6
(Spain) J Sánchez	6	6	4
(Slovakia) M Vajda	6	6
(Argentina) G Vilas	3	3
(United States) A Agassi	6	6
3	(Sweden) A Järryd	2	3
7	(Czechoslovakia) T Smid	7	6
(Germany) R Osterthun	5	3
(Spain) D de Miguel	1	4
(Haiti) R Agénor	6	6
Q	(West Germany) P Kühnen	6	7
WC	(Poland) W Fibak	3	6
Q	(Australia) M Woodforde	7	6
2	(Spain) E Sánchez	6	3

Second round
(Czech Republic) J Navrátil	6	7
(West Germany) A Maurer	4	5
(Slovakia) M Vajda	4	3
(United States) A Agassi	6	6
7	(Czechoslovakia) T Smid	5	6	3
(Haiti) R Agénor	7	2	6
Q	(West Germany) P Kühnen	6	6
Q	(Australia) M Woodforde	1	2

Quarterfinals
(Czech Republic) J Navrátil	2	6	3
(United States) A Agassi	6	0	6
(Haiti) R Agénor	7	6	6
Q	(West Germany) P Kühnen	5	7	4

Semifinals
(United States) A Agassi	1	4
(Haiti) R Agénor	6	6
