= 1987 ABN World Tennis Tournament =

- Date: 16–22 March
- Edition: 15th
- Category: Grand Prix circuit
- Draw: 32S / 18D
- Prize money: $250,000
- Surface: Carpet / indoor
- Location: Rotterdam, Netherlands
- Venue: Rotterdam Ahoy

Champions

Singles
- (Sweden) Stefan Edberg

Doubles
- (Sweden) Stefan Edberg / (Sweden) Anders Järryd
- ABN World Tennis Tournament

The 1987 ABN World Tennis Tournament was a men's tennis tournament played on indoor carpet courts at Rotterdam Ahoy in the Netherlands. It was part of the 1987 Nabisco Grand Prix. It was the 15th edition of the tournament and was held from 16 March through 22 March 1987. First-seeded Stefan Edberg won the singles title.

== Finals ==
=== Singles ===
(Sweden) Stefan Edberg defeated (United States) John McEnroe 3–6, 6–3, 6–1

- It was Edberg's 4th singles title of the year and the 11th of his career.

=== Doubles ===
(Sweden) Stefan Edberg / (Sweden) Anders Järryd defeated (United States) Chip Hooper / (United States) Mike Leach 3–6, 6–3, 6–4
