= 1991 Rado Swiss Open – Doubles =

Doubles
- 1991 Rado Swiss Open

Final
- Champions: (South Africa) Gary Muller (South Africa) Danie Visser
- Runners-up: (France) Guy Forget (Switzerland) Jakob Hlasek
- Score: 7–6, 6–4

Details
- Draw: 16 (1WC/1Q)
- Seeds: 4

Events
Singles	Doubles
- Swiss Open

Sergio Casal and Emilio Sánchez were the defending champions, but Casal did not compete this year. Sánchez teamed up with Omar Camporese and lost in the semifinals to Guy Forget and Jakob Hlasek.

Gary Muller and Danie Visser won the title by defeating Forget and Hlasek 7–6, 6–4 in the final.

== Seeds ==
1. (South Africa) Gary Muller / (South Africa) Danie Visser (champions)
2. (France) Guy Forget / (Switzerland) Jakob Hlasek (final)
3. (Germany) Udo Riglewski / (Germany) Michael Stich (first round)
4. (Italy) Omar Camporese / (Spain) Emilio Sánchez (semifinals)

== Draw ==
Key

- Q = Qualifier
- WC = Wild card
- LL = Lucky loser
- Alt = Alternate
- ITF = ITF entry
- PR = Protected ranking
- SR = Special ranking
- SE = Special exempt
- JE = Junior exempt
- JR = Junior Accelerator Programme entrant
- CO = College Accelerator Programme entrant
- NG = Next Gen Accelerator Program entrant
- w/o = Walkover
- r = Retired
- d = Defaulted

=== Draw ===
First round
1	(South Africa) G Muller (South Africa) D Visser	5	6	7
(Argentina) H de la Peña (Australia) W Masur	7	4	6
(Netherlands) HJ Davids (Czechoslovakia) L Pimek	6	6
(Argentina) G Luza (Brazil) C Motta	3	3
3	(West Germany) U Riglewski (West Germany) M Stich	6	6	6
(Czechoslovakia) K Nováček (Socialist Federal Republic of Yugoslavia) G Prpić	3	7	7
(Czechoslovakia) V Flégl (Czechoslovakia) C Suk	4	4
WC	(Socialist Federal Republic of Yugoslavia) G Ivanišević (Switzerland) M Rosset	6	6
(Spain) S Bruguera (Ecuador) A Gómez	6	7
(South Africa) D Adams (Netherlands) M Oosting	4	5
Q	(Argentina) M Jaite (Argentina) C Miniussi	6	2
4	(Italy) O Camporese (Spain) E Sánchez	7	6
(Czechoslovakia) P Korda (Czechoslovakia) D Vacek	3	6	1
(Spain) J Sánchez (France) É Winogradsky	6	3	6
(South Africa) S Kruger (Australia) D Macpherson	4	1
2	(France) G Forget (Switzerland) J Hlasek	6	6

Quarterfinals
1	(South Africa) G Muller (South Africa) D Visser	6	6	7
(Netherlands) HJ Davids (Czechoslovakia) L Pimek	3	7	6
(Czechoslovakia) K Nováček (Socialist Federal Republic of Yugoslavia) G Prpić	6	7
WC	(Socialist Federal Republic of Yugoslavia) G Ivanišević (Switzerland) M Rosset	4	6
(Spain) S Bruguera (Ecuador) A Gómez
4	(Italy) O Camporese (Spain) E Sánchez	w/o
(Spain) J Sánchez (France) É Winogradsky	6	3
2	(France) G Forget (Switzerland) J Hlasek	7	6

Semifinals
1	(South Africa) G Muller (South Africa) D Visser	7	7
(Czechoslovakia) K Nováček (Socialist Federal Republic of Yugoslavia) G Prpić	6	5
4	(Italy) O Camporese (Spain) E Sánchez	6	5	6
2	(France) G Forget (Switzerland) J Hlasek	4	7	7

Final
1	(South Africa) G Muller (South Africa) D Visser	7	6
2	(France) G Forget (Switzerland) J Hlasek	6	4
