= 1987 South African Open (tennis) =

- Date: 16–22 November
- Edition: 84th
- Category: Grand Prix
- Draw: 32S / 16D
- Prize money: $232,000
- Surface: Hard / outdoor
- Location: Johannesburg, South Africa

Champions

Singles
- (Australia) Pat Cash

Doubles
- (United States) Kevin Curren / (United States) David Pate
- South African Open

The 1987 South African Open was a men's tennis tournament played on outdoor hard courts in Johannesburg, South Africa that was part of the 1987 Nabisco Grand Prix. It was the 84th edition of the tournament and was held from 16 November through 22 November 1987. First-seeded Pat Cash, who entered the main draw on a wildcard, won the singles title.

== Finals ==
=== Singles ===
(Australia) Pat Cash defeated (United States) Brad Gilbert 7–6, 4–6, 2–6, 6–0, 6–1

- It was Cash' 3rd and last singles title of the year and the 5th of his career.

=== Doubles ===
(United States) Kevin Curren / (United States) David Pate defeated (United States) Eric Korita / (United States) Brad Pearce 6–4, 6–4
