= 1987 Grand Prix de Tennis de Toulouse =

- Date: 12–18 October
- Edition: 6th
- Category: Regular Series
- Draw: 32S / 16D
- Prize money: $175,000
- Surface: Carpet / indoor
- Location: Toulouse, France

Champions

Singles
- (United States) Tim Mayotte

Doubles
- (Poland) Wojciech Fibak / (Netherlands) Michiel Schapers
- Grand Prix de Tennis de Toulouse

The 1987 Grand Prix de Tennis de Toulouse was a men's tennis tournament played on indoor carpet courts in Toulouse, France that was part of the Regular Series of the 1987 Grand Prix tennis circuit. It was the sixth edition of the tournament and was held from 12 October until 18 October 1987. First-seeded Tim Mayotte won the singles title.

== Finals ==
=== Singles ===
(United States) Tim Mayotte defeated (West Germany) Ricki Osterthun, 6–2, 5–7, 6–4

- It was Mayotte's 3rd singles title of the year and the 5th of his career.

=== Doubles ===
(Poland) Wojciech Fibak / (Netherlands) Michiel Schapers defeated (United States) Kelly Jones / (West Germany) Patrik Kühnen, 6–2, 6–4
