= 1987 Grand Prix de Tennis de Toulouse – Singles =

Singles
- 1987 Grand Prix de Tennis de Toulouse

Final
- Champion: (United States) Tim Mayotte
- Runner-up: (West Germany) Ricki Osterthun
- Score: 6–2, 5–7, 6–4

Details
- Draw: 32
- Seeds: 8

Events
Singles	Doubles
← 1986 ·	Grand Prix de Tennis de Toulouse	· 1988 →

The 1987 Grand Prix de Tennis de Toulouse was a men's tennis tournament played on indoor carpet courts in Toulouse, France that was part of the Regular Series of the 1987 Grand Prix tennis circuit. It was the sixth edition of the tournament and was held from 12 October – 18 October.

== Seeds ==
Champion seeds are indicated in bold text while text in italics indicates the round in which those seeds were eliminated.

1. (United States) **Tim Mayotte (champion)**
2. (Spain) Emilio Sánchez (first round)
3. (France) Guy Forget (second round)
4. (Switzerland) Jakob Hlasek (semifinals)
5. (Sweden) Jan Gunnarsson (second round)
6. (Sweden) Jonas Svensson (first round)
7. (Czechoslovakia) Tomáš Šmíd (first round)
8. (Switzerland) Claudio Mezzadri (quarterfinals)

== Draw ==
=== Key ===
- Q = Qualifier
- WC = Wild card
- LL = Lucky loser
- Alt = Alternate
- SE = Special exempt
- PR = Protected ranking
- ITF = ITF entry
- JE = Junior exempt
- w/o = Walkover
- r = Retired
- d = Defaulted
- SR = Special ranking

=== Finals ===
Semifinals
1	**(United States) Tim Mayotte**	**6**	**6**
4	(Switzerland) Jakob Hlasek	3	1
(United States) Tim Wilkison	**7**	4	2
**(Germany) Ricki Osterthun**	5	**6**	**6**

Final
1	**(United States) Tim Mayotte**	**6**	5	**6**
(West Germany) Ricki Osterthun	2	**7**	4

=== Top half ===
First round
1	**(United States) T Mayotte**	**6**	**6**
(United States) K Jones	4	3
**(Nigeria) N Odizor**	**6**	**6**
(Czechoslovakia) M Šrejber	3	4
**(United States) B Testerman**	**6**	**6**
(United States) M Purcell	4	4
8	**(Switzerland) C Mezzadri**	**6**	**6**
(France) T Benhabiles	1	1
4	**(Switzerland) J Hlasek**	**6**	**7**
(Spain) D de Miguel	1	5
**(Netherlands) M Schapers**	**6**	**6**
(Poland) W Fibak	2	1
**(West Germany) P Kühnen**	6	**6**	**6**
(Austria) T Muster	**7**	3	3
5	**(Sweden) J Gunnarsson**	**6**	**6**
(Uruguay) D Pérez	3	3

Second round
1	**(United States) T Mayotte**	**7**	**6**
(Nigeria) N Odizor	6	3
(United States) B Testerman	6	**7**	2
8	**(Switzerland) C Mezzadri**	**7**	6	**6**
4	**(Switzerland) J Hlasek**	**6**	**6**
(Netherlands) M Schapers	3	4
**(West Germany) P Kühnen**	6	**6**	**6**
5	(Sweden) J Gunnarsson	**7**	1	4

Quarterfinals
1	**(United States) T Mayotte**	**6**	**6**
8	(Switzerland) C Mezzadri	2	1
4	**(Switzerland) J Hlasek**	**6**	1	**6**
(West Germany) P Kühnen	4	**6**	2

Semifinals
1	**(United States) T Mayotte**	**6**	**6**
4	(Switzerland) J Hlasek	3	1

=== Bottom half ===
First round
**(Australia) M Woodforde**	**6**	**6**
6	(Sweden) J Svensson	2	3
**(United States) T Wilkison**	**6**	**6**
(Argentina) H de la Peña	0	1
**(France) J Potier**	**6**	**6**
(Netherlands) T Nijssen	2	4
3	**(France) G Forget**	**6**	**6**
(Haiti) R Agénor	1	2
**(Australia) C Limberger**	**6**	**6**
7	(Czechoslovakia) T Šmíd	1	3
**(West Germany) R Osterthun**	1	**7**	**7**
(Socialist Federal Republic of Yugoslavia) M Ostoja	**6**	5	6
**(South Africa) P Norval**	**6**	**6**
(France) J-P Fleurian	4	4
**(Brazil) L Mattar**	**6**	**6**
2	(Spain) E Sánchez	4	4

Second round
(Australia) M Woodforde	**7**	4	6
**(United States) T Wilkison**	5	**6**	**7**
**(France) J Potier**	6	**6**	**6**
3	(France) G Forget	**7**	0	0
(Australia) C Limberger	4	2
**(West Germany) R Osterthun**	**6**	**6**
(South Africa) P Norval	6	4
**(Brazil) L Mattar**	**7**	**6**

Quarterfinals
**(United States) T Wilkison**	**6**	6	**6**
(France) J Potier	4	**7**	3
**(West Germany) R Osterthun**	3	**6**	**6**
(Brazil) L Mattar	**6**	4	3

Semifinals
(United States) T Wilkison	**7**	4	2
**(West Germany) R Osterthun**	5	**6**	**6**
