= 1987 Grand Prix de Tennis de Toulouse – Doubles =

Doubles
- 1987 Grand Prix de Tennis de Toulouse

Final
- Champions: (Poland) Wojciech Fibak (Netherlands) Michiel Schapers
- Runners-up: (United States) Kelly Jones (West Germany) Patrik Kühnen
- Score: 6–2, 6–4

Details
- Draw: 16
- Seeds: 4

Events
Singles	Doubles
- Grand Prix de Tennis de Toulouse

The 1987 Grand Prix de Tennis de Toulouse was a men's tennis tournament played on indoor carpet in Toulouse, France that was part of the Regular Series of the 1987 Grand Prix tennis circuit. It was the sixth edition of the tournament and was held from 12 October until 18 October 1987.

== Seeds ==
Champion seeds are indicated in bold text while text in italics indicates the round in which those seeds were eliminated.

1. (Spain) Sergio Casal / (Spain) Emilio Sánchez (semifinals)
2. (France) Guy Forget / (Czechoslovakia) Tomáš Šmíd (quarterfinals)
3. (Iran) Mansour Bahrami / (Uruguay) Diego Pérez (first round)
4. (Denmark) Michael Mortensen / (United States) Tim Wilkison (quarterfinals)

== Draw ==
Key

- Q = Qualifier
- WC = Wild card
- LL = Lucky loser
- Alt = Alternate
- ITF = ITF entry
- PR = Protected ranking
- SR = Special ranking
- SE = Special exempt
- JE = Junior exempt
- JR = Junior Accelerator Programme entrant
- CO = College Accelerator Programme entrant
- NG = Next Gen Accelerator Program entrant
- w/o = Walkover
- r = Retired
- d = Defaulted

=== Finals ===
First round
1	(Spain) **S Casal** **(Spain) E Sánchez**	3	**6**	**6**
(France) J-P Fleurian (Romania) I Năstase	**6**	2	4
(Czechoslovakia) **M Šrejber** **(Czechoslovakia) C Suk**	**6**	**7**
(France) C Lesage (France) T Pham	4	6
4	(Denmark) **M Mortensen** **(United States) T Wilkison**	**7**	**6**
(Brazil) D Campos (West Germany) R Osterthun	6	3
(United States) **K Jones** **(West Germany) P Kühnen**	**6**	**6**
(Spain) D de Miguel (West Germany) H Rittersbacher	3	2
(Nigeria) **N Odizor** **(United States) B Testerman**	**7**	**6**
(Switzerland) J Hlasek (Switzerland) C Mezzadri	6	3
(Spain) **J Sánchez** **(Sweden) S Svensson**	**6**	**6**
3	(Iran) M Bahrami (Uruguay) D Pérez	1	4
(Poland) **W Fibak** **(Netherlands) M Schapers**	4	**6**	**7**
(France) B Dadillon (France) J Potier	**6**	1	6
2	(France) **G Forget** **(Czechoslovakia) T Šmíd**	**7**	**6**
(Brazil) R Acioly (Brazil) L Mattar	6	4

Quarterfinals
1	(Spain) **S Casal** **(Spain) E Sánchez**	**6**	**6**
(Czechoslovakia) M Šrejber (Czechoslovakia) C Suk	3	3
4	(Denmark) M Mortensen (United States) T Wilkison	6	1
(United States) **K Jones** **(West Germany) P Kühnen**	**7**	**6**
(Nigeria) **N Odizor** **(United States) B Testerman**	**7**	**6**
(Spain) J Sánchez (Sweden) S Svensson	6	3
(Poland) **W Fibak** **(Netherlands) M Schapers**	**6**	**7**
2	(France) G Forget (Czechoslovakia) T Šmíd	2	5

Semifinals
1	(Spain) S Casal (Spain) E Sánchez	**7**	5	5
(United States) **K Jones** **(West Germany) P Kühnen**	6	**7**	**7**
(Nigeria) N Odizor (United States) B Testerman	1	**6**	6
(Poland) **W Fibak** **(Netherlands) M Schapers**	**6**	3	**7**

Final
(United States) K Jones (West Germany) P Kühnen	2	4
(Poland) **W Fibak** **(Netherlands) M Schapers**	**6**	**6**
