= 1987 Campionati Internazionali della Valle D'Aosta =

- Date: 10–16 August
- Edition: 2nd
- Category: Grand Prix
- Draw: 32S / 16D
- Prize money: $100,000
- Surface: Clay / outdoor
- Location: Saint-Vincent, Aosta Valley Italy

Champions

Singles
- (Chile) Pedro Rebolledo

Doubles
- (United States) Bud Cox / (Australia) Michael Fancutt
- ATP Saint-Vincent

The 1987 Campionati Internazionali della Valle D'Aosta (International Championships of Valle d'Aosta), was a men's tennis tournament played on outdoor clay courts that was part of the 1987 Nabisco Grand Prix. It was the second edition of the tournament and took place in Saint-Vincent, Aosta Valley, Italy, from 10 August until 16 August 1987. Unseeded Pedro Rebolledo won the singles title.

== Finals ==
=== Singles ===
(Chile) Pedro Rebolledo defeated (Italy) Francesco Cancellotti, 7–6, 4–6, 6–3

- It was Rebolledo's only singles title of the year and the 3rd and last of his career.

=== Doubles ===
(United States) Bud Cox / (Australia) Michael Fancutt defeated (Italy) Massimo Cierro / (Italy) Alessandro de Minicis, 6–3, 6–4

- It was Cox's only doubles title of his career. It was Fancutt's only doubles title of his career.
