= 1987 Swiss Indoors – Doubles =

Doubles
- 1987 Swiss Indoors

Final
- Champions: (Sweden) Anders Järryd (Czechoslovakia) Tomáš Šmíd
- Runners-up: (Czechoslovakia) Stanislav Birner (Czechoslovakia) Jaroslav Navrátil
- Score: 6–4, 6–3

Details
- Draw: 16
- Seeds: 4

Events
Singles	Doubles
← 1986 ·	Swiss Indoors	· 1988 →

Guy Forget and Yannick Noah were the defending champions, but lost in the semifinals to Anders Järryd and Tomáš Šmíd.

Järryd and Šmíd won the title by defeating Stanislav Birner and Jaroslav Navrátil 6–4, 6–3 in the final.

== Seeds ==
1. (France) Guy Forget / (France) Yannick Noah (semifinals)
2. (Spain) Sergio Casal / (Spain) Emilio Sánchez (semifinals)
3. (Sweden) Anders Järryd / (Czechoslovakia) Tomáš Šmíd (champions)
4. (Iran) Mansour Bahrami / (Uruguay) Diego Pérez (first round)

== Draw ==
=== Key ===
- Q = Qualifier
- WC = Wild card
- LL = Lucky loser
- Alt = Alternate
- SE = Special exempt
- PR = Protected ranking
- ITF = ITF entry
- JE = Junior exempt
- w/o = Walkover
- r = Retired
- d = Defaulted
- SR = Special ranking

First round
1	(France) G Forget (France) Y Noah	7	6
(Switzerland) H Gunthardt (Switzerland) C Mezzadri	6	3
WC	(Italy) S Mezzadri (Switzerland) R Stadler	5	7	1
(Netherlands) T Nijssen (Germany) R Osterthun	7	6	6
3	(Sweden) A Järryd (Czechoslovakia) T Smid	3	7	6
(United States) M Dickson (Nigeria) N Odizor	6	6	2
(Australia) C Limberger (Australia) M Woodforde	4	5
(Poland) W Fibak (Sweden) J Svensson	6	7
(Czechoslovakia) S Birner (Czech Republic) J Navrátil	6	7
(Haiti) R Agénor (Italy) U Colombini	4	5
(Spain) D de Miguel (Spain) J Sánchez	6	7
4	(Iran) M Bahrami (Uruguay) D Pérez	3	6
(Sweden) R Båthman (Czech Republic) I Werner	3	6	3
(Netherlands) M Schapers (United States) T Wilkison	6	3	6
(Israel) G Bloom (Israel) A Mansdorf	4	6	4
2	(Spain) S Casal (Spain) E Sánchez	6	4	6

Quarterfinals
1	(France) G Forget (France) Y Noah	3	6	6
(Netherlands) T Nijssen (Germany) R Osterthun	6	3	4
3	(Sweden) A Järryd (Czechoslovakia) T Smid	7	6
(Poland) W Fibak (Sweden) J Svensson	6	3
(Czechoslovakia) S Birner (Czech Republic) J Navrátil	6	3	7
(Spain) D de Miguel (Spain) J Sánchez	2	6	6
(Netherlands) M Schapers (United States) T Wilkison	4	3
2	(Spain) S Casal (Spain) E Sánchez	6	6

Semifinals
1	(France) G Forget (France) Y Noah	3	2
3	(Sweden) A Järryd (Czechoslovakia) T Smid	6	6
(Czechoslovakia) S Birner (Czech Republic) J Navrátil	7	4	7
2	(Spain) S Casal (Spain) E Sánchez	6	6	6

Final
3	(Sweden) A Järryd (Czechoslovakia) T Smid	6	6
(Czechoslovakia) S Birner (Czech Republic) J Navrátil	4	3
