= 1987 Bologna Open =

- Date: 8–14 June
- Edition: 3rd
- Category: Grand Prix
- Draw: 32S / 16D
- Prize money: $89,400
- Surface: Clay / outdoor
- Location: Bologna, Italy

Champions

Singles
- (Sweden) Kent Carlsson

Doubles
- (Spain) Sergio Casal / (Spain) Emilio Sánchez
← 1986 ·	Bologna Outdoor	· 1988 →

The 1987 Bologna Open was a men's tennis tournament played on outdoor clay courts in Bologna, Italy that was part of the 1987 Nabisco Grand Prix circuit. It was the third edition of the tournament and was played from 8 June until 14 June 1987. First-seeded Kent Carlsson won the singles title.

== Finals ==
=== Singles ===
(Sweden) Kent Carlsson defeated (Spain) Emilio Sánchez 6–2, 6–1

- It was Carlsson's 2nd singles title of the year and the 4th of his career.

=== Doubles ===
(Spain) Sergio Casal / (Spain) Emilio Sánchez defeated (Italy) Claudio Panatta / (United States) Blaine Willenborg 6–3, 6–2
