= 1987 Volvo Tennis Los Angeles =

- Date: September 21–27
- Edition: 61st
- Category: Grand Prix
- Draw: 32S / 16D
- Prize money: $250,000
- Surface: Hard / outdoor
- Location: Los Angeles, California, U.S.
- Venue: Los Angeles Tennis Center

Champions

Singles
- (United States) David Pate

Doubles
- (United States) Kevin Curren / (United States) David Pate
- Pacific Southwest Open

The 1987 Volvo Tennis Los Angeles was a men's tennis tournament played on outdoor hard courts at the Los Angeles Tennis Center in Los Angeles, California in the United States that was part of the 1987 Volvo Grand Prix circuit. It was the 61st edition of the Pacific Southwest tournament and was held from September 21 through September 27, 1987. Third-seeded David Pate won the singles title and earned $50,000 first-prize money.

== Finals ==
=== Singles ===
(United States) David Pate defeated (Sweden) Stefan Edberg 6–4, 6–4

- It was Pate's 1st singles title of the year and the 2nd and last of his career.

=== Doubles ===
(United States) Kevin Curren / (United States) David Pate defeated (United States) Brad Gilbert / (United States) Tim Wilkison 6–3, 6–4

== See also ==
- 1987 Virginia Slims of Los Angeles – women's tournament
