= 1987 Swiss Indoors =

Tennis tournament

- Date: 5–11 October
- Edition: 18th
- Category: Grand Prix
- Draw: 32S / 16D
- Prize money: $200,000
- Surface: Hard / indoor
- Location: Basel, Switzerland
- Venue: St. Jakobshalle

Champions

Singles
- (France) Yannick Noah

Doubles
- (Sweden) Anders Järryd / (Czechoslovakia) Tomáš Šmíd
- Swiss Indoors

The 1987 Swiss Indoors was a men's tennis tournament played on indoor hard courts at the St. Jakobshalle in Basel, Switzerland that was part of the 1987 Nabisco Grand Prix circuit. It was the 18th edition of the tournament and took place from 5 October until 11 October 1987. First-seeded Yannick Noah won the singles title.

== Finals ==
=== Singles ===
(France) Yannick Noah defeated (Haiti) Ronald Agénor 7–6^{(8–6)}, 6–4, 6–4

- It was Noah's 2nd singles title of the year and the 21st of his career.

=== Doubles ===
(Sweden) Anders Järryd / (Czechoslovakia) Tomáš Šmíd defeated (Czechoslovakia) Stanislav Birner / (Czechoslovakia) Jaroslav Navrátil 6–4, 6–3
