= 1991 Rado Swiss Open – Singles =

Singles
- 1991 Rado Swiss Open

Final
- Champion: (Spain) Emilio Sánchez
- Runner-up: (Spain) Sergi Bruguera
- Score: 6–1, 6–4, 6–4

Details
- Draw: 32 (3WC/4Q)
- Seeds: 8

Events
Singles	Doubles
- Swiss Open

Martín Jaite was the defending champion, but lost in the quarterfinals to Emilio Sánchez.

Sánchez won the title by defeating Sergi Bruguera 6–1, 6–4, 6–4 in the final.

== Seeds ==
1. (Spain) Sergi Bruguera (final)
2. (Germany) Michael Stich (quarterfinals)
3. (France) Guy Forget (second round)
4. (Socialist Federal Republic of Yugoslavia) Goran Ivanišević (semifinals)
5. (Spain) Emilio Sánchez (champion)
6. (Switzerland) Jakob Hlasek (first round)
7. (Czechoslovakia) Karel Nováček (semifinals)
8. (Socialist Federal Republic of Yugoslavia) Goran Prpić (second round)

== Draw ==
Key

- Q = Qualifier
- WC = Wild card
- LL = Lucky loser
- Alt = Alternate
- ITF = ITF entry
- PR = Protected ranking
- SR = Special ranking
- SE = Special exempt
- JE = Junior exempt
- JR = Junior Accelerator Programme entrant
- CO = College Accelerator Programme entrant
- NG = Next Gen Accelerator Program entrant
- w/o = Walkover
- r = Retired
- d = Defaulted

=== Finals ===
Semifinals
1	(Spain) Sergi Bruguera	6	7
4	(Socialist Federal Republic of Yugoslavia) Goran Ivanišević	1	5
5	(Spain) Emilio Sánchez	6	6
7	(Czechoslovakia) Karel Nováček	2	1

Final
1	(Spain) Sergi Bruguera	1	4	4
5	(Spain) Emilio Sánchez	6	6	6

=== Top half ===
First round
1	(Spain) S Bruguera	7	6
(Australia) W Masur	5	4
(Argentina) G Pérez Roldán	4	4
(Haiti) R Agénor	6	6
WC	(Germany) CU Steeb	5	3
(Ecuador) A Gómez	7	6
(France) F Santoro	6^{1}	6	4
8	(Socialist Federal Republic of Yugoslavia) G Prpić	7^{7}	1	6
4	(Socialist Federal Republic of Yugoslavia) G Ivanišević	5	7	6
(Spain) J Sánchez	7	5	1
WC	(United States) D Wheaton	4	7^{8}	6
(Switzerland) M Rosset	6	6^{6}	2
(Spain) F Clavet	3	1
(Argentina) H de la Peña	6	6
(Austria) H Skoff	6	7^{7}
6	(Switzerland) J Hlasek	4	6^{4}

Second round
1	(Spain) S Bruguera	6	6
(Haiti) R Agénor	4	0
(Ecuador) A Gómez	4	7^{8}	6
8	(Socialist Federal Republic of Yugoslavia) G Prpić	6	6^{6}	4
4	(Socialist Federal Republic of Yugoslavia) G Ivanišević	6	6
WC	(United States) D Wheaton	4	4
(Argentina) H de la Peña	6	6
(Austria) H Skoff	1	1

Quarterfinals
1	(Spain) S Bruguera	7^{7}	7^{7}
(Ecuador) A Gómez	6^{0}	6^{3}
4	(Socialist Federal Republic of Yugoslavia) G Ivanišević	6	6
(Argentina) H de la Peña	4	2

Semifinals
1	(Spain) S Bruguera	6	7
4	(Socialist Federal Republic of Yugoslavia) G Ivanišević	1	5

=== Bottom half ===
First round
5	(Spain) E Sánchez	6	6
Q	(Socialist Federal Republic of Yugoslavia) S Hiršzon	2	4
(Spain) J Arrese	6^{6}	3
(United States) A Krickstein	7^{8}	6
(Czechoslovakia) P Korda	1	4
(Argentina) M Jaite	6	6
(Czechoslovakia) M Vajda	2	6	3
3	(France) G Forget	6	2	6
7	(Czechoslovakia) K Nováček	6	6
(Soviet Union) A Chesnokov	0	2
(Italy) O Camporese	2	2
WC	(Switzerland) C Mezzadri	6	6
Q	(Czechoslovakia) D Vacek	7^{7}	6
Q	(Brazil) R Jabali	6^{4}	0
Q	(Czechoslovakia) C Suk	1	2
2	(Germany) M Stich	6	6

Second round
5	(Spain) E Sánchez	6	6
(United States) A Krickstein	3	2
(Argentina) M Jaite	7^{7}	7
3	(France) G Forget	6^{5}	5
7	(Czechoslovakia) K Nováček	6	6
WC	(Switzerland) C Mezzadri	3	2
Q	(Czechoslovakia) D Vacek	4	0
2	(Germany) M Stich	6	6

Quarterfinals
5	(Spain) E Sánchez	6	7
(Argentina) M Jaite	4	5
7	(Czechoslovakia) K Nováček	6	6
2	(Germany) M Stich	3	4

Semifinals
5	(Spain) E Sánchez	6	6
7	(Czechoslovakia) K Nováček	2	1
