= 1987 Volvo Tennis Los Angeles – Singles =

Singles
- 1987 Volvo Tennis Los Angeles

Final
- Champion: (United States) David Pate
- Runner-up: (Sweden) Stefan Edberg
- Score: 6–4, 6–4

Details
- Draw: 32 (3WC/3Q)
- Seeds: 8

Events
Singles	Doubles
- Los Angeles Open

Defending champion John McEnroe was unable to compete this year, following a two-month suspension after a series of code violations caused at the US Open.

David Pate won the title by defeating Stefan Edberg 6–4, 6–4 in the final.

== Seeds ==
1. (Sweden) Stefan Edberg (final)
2. (United States) Brad Gilbert (semifinals)
3. (United States) David Pate (champion)
4. (United States) Scott Davis (first round)
5. (France) Guy Forget (second round)
6. (United States) Kevin Curren (second round)
7. (India) Ramesh Krishnan (first round)
8. (United States) Johan Kriek (first round)

== Draw ==
Key

- Q = Qualifier
- WC = Wild card
- LL = Lucky loser
- Alt = Alternate
- ITF = ITF entry
- PR = Protected ranking
- SR = Special ranking
- SE = Special exempt
- JE = Junior exempt
- JR = Junior Accelerator Programme entrant
- CO = College Accelerator Programme entrant
- NG = Next Gen Accelerator Program entrant
- w/o = Walkover
- r = Retired
- d = Defaulted

=== Finals ===
Semifinals
1	(Sweden) Stefan Edberg	6	6
(United States) Tim Wilkison	2	3
3	(United States) David Pate	6	6	6
2	(United States) Brad Gilbert	3	7	3

Final
1	(Sweden) Stefan Edberg	4	4
3	(United States) David Pate	6	6

=== Top half ===
First round
1	(Sweden) S Edberg	6	6
Q	(United States) M Flur	2	2
(United States) J Berger	6	6
(United States) M Purcell	2	4
(United States) D Rostagno	7	6
(United States) M Anger	6	2
(United States) P Annacone	6	6
7	(India) R Krishnan	4	3
4	(United States) S Davis	6	2
(South Africa) G Muller	7	6
(United States) T Wilkison	6	6	6
(United States) S Giammalva Jr.	7	4	2
(United States) J Pugh	6	6
Q	(United States) M Davis	7	7
(United States) D Goldie	6	5	2
6	(United States) K Curren	3	7	6

Second round
1	(Sweden) S Edberg	6	7
(United States) J Berger	3	6
(United States) D Rostagno	2	6
(United States) P Annacone	6	7
(South Africa) G Muller	4	4
(United States) T Wilkison	6	6
Q	(United States) M Davis	7	6	7
6	(United States) K Curren	6	7	6

Quarterfinals
1	(Sweden) S Edberg	6	7
(United States) P Annacone	1	5
(United States) T Wilkison	4	7	6
Q	(United States) M Davis	6	6	4

Semifinals
1	(Sweden) S Edberg	6	6
(United States) T Wilkison	2	3

=== Bottom half ===
First round
5	(France) G Forget	6	6	6
WC	(United States) P Fleming	3	7	1
(United States) A Agassi	6	6	6
(Peru) J Yzaga	1	7	2
(South Africa) D Visser	3	3
WC	(Sweden) P Lundgren	6	6
WC	(United States) M Chang	3	6
3	(United States) D Pate	6	7
8	(United States) J Kriek	3	4
(United States) E Teltscher	6	6
Q	(United States) R Leach	6	6
Q	(Chile) R Acuña	4	2
(United States) J Grabb	4	6
(New Zealand) K Evernden	6	7
(United States) T Witsken	2	3
2	(United States) B Gilbert	6	6

Second round
5	(France) G Forget	3	6
(United States) A Agassi	6	7
WC	(Sweden) P Lundgren	4	4
3	(United States) D Pate	6	6
(United States) E Teltscher	6	6
Q	(United States) R Leach	4	3
(New Zealand) K Evernden	3	6
2	(United States) B Gilbert	6	7

Quarterfinals
(United States) A Agassi	7	6	2
3	(United States) D Pate	5	7	6
(United States) E Teltscher	1	4
2	(United States) B Gilbert	6	6

Semifinals
3	(United States) D Pate	6	6	6
2	(United States) B Gilbert	3	7	3
