= 1987 ABN World Tennis Tournament – Singles =

Tennis tournament

Singles
- 1987 ABN World Tennis Tournament

Final
- Champion: (Sweden) Stefan Edberg
- Runner-up: (United States) John McEnroe
- Score: 3-6,6-3,6-1

Details
- Draw: 32
- Seeds: 8

Events
Singles	Doubles
- ABN World Tennis Tournament

Joakim Nyström was the defending champion of the singles event at the ABN World Tennis Tournament but lost in the second round. First-seeded Stefan Edberg won the singles title after a 6–1, 6–2 win in the final against fourth-seeded John McEnroe.

== Seeds ==
1. (Sweden) Stefan Edberg (champion)
2. (Czechoslovakia) Miloslav Mečíř (semifinals)
3. (Sweden) Joakim Nyström (second round)
4. (United States) John McEnroe (final)
5. (Sweden) Michael Pernfors (first round)
6. (Spain) Emilio Sánchez (second round)
7. (Sweden) Jonas Svensson (quarterfinals)
8. (Switzerland) Jakob Hlasek (second round)

== Draw ==
=== Finals ===
Semifinals
1	(Sweden) Stefan Edberg	6	6
(United States) Jim Grabb	3	4
4	(United States) John McEnroe	6	7
2	(Czechoslovakia) Miloslav Mečíř	1	5

Final
1	(Sweden) Stefan Edberg	3	6	6
4	(United States) John McEnroe	6	3	1

=== Upper half ===
First round
1	(Sweden) Stefan Edberg	6	6
(Czechoslovakia) Stanislav Birner	1	2
(West Germany) Andreas Maurer	7	6
(Netherlands) Huub van Boeckel	6	1
(Sweden) Anders Järryd	6	6
(Sweden) Jan Gunnarsson	0	2
(United States) Mike Leach	6	6	6
8	(Switzerland) Jakob Hlasek	4	7	4
3	(Sweden) Joakim Nyström	0	6	6
(Czechoslovakia) Marián Vajda	6	4	3
(United States) Chip Hooper	6	6
(Czechoslovakia) Karel Nováček	3	4
(United States) Jim Grabb	7	6
(United States) Jonathan Canter	6	3
(Czechoslovakia) Libor Pimek	5	6	6
5	(Sweden) Mikael Pernfors	7	4	2

Second round
1	(Sweden) Stefan Edberg	6	6
(West Germany) Andreas Maurer	0	0
(Sweden) Anders Järryd	7	3	7
(United States) Mike Leach	6	6	6
3	(Sweden) Joakim Nyström	4	4
(United States) Chip Hooper	6	6
(United States) Jim Grabb	6	4
(Czechoslovakia) Libor Pimek	4	1	r

Quarterfinals
1	(Sweden) Stefan Edberg	6	6	6
(Sweden) Anders Järryd	3	7	4
(United States) Chip Hooper	1	6
(United States) Jim Grabb	6	7

Semifinals
1	(Sweden) Stefan Edberg	6	6
(United States) Jim Grabb	3	4

=== Lower half ===
First round
6	(Spain) Emilio Sánchez	7	6
(United States) Peter Fleming	6	3
(Israel) Amos Mansdorf	6	6
(Netherlands) Menno Oosting	3	3
(Netherlands) Michiel Schapers	6	2	6
(Australia) Carl Limberger	3	6	1
(Soviet Union) Andrei Chesnokov	4	4
4	(United States) John McEnroe	6	6
7	(Sweden) Jonas Svensson	6	6
(Sweden) Peter Lundgren	2	3
(Australia) Broderick Dyke	7	1	6
(Czechoslovakia) Tomáš Šmíd	5	6	3
(France) Guy Forget	6	6
(West Germany) Eric Jelen	1	4
(Australia) Darren Cahill	2	3
2	(Czechoslovakia) Miloslav Mečíř	6	6

Second round
6	(Spain) Emilio Sánchez	5	2
(Israel) Amos Mansdorf	7	6
(Netherlands) Michiel Schapers	4	0
4	(United States) John McEnroe	6	6
7	(Sweden) Jonas Svensson	6	6
(Australia) Broderick Dyke	4	0
(France) Guy Forget	5	5
2	(Czechoslovakia) Miloslav Mečíř	7	7

Quarterfinals
(Israel) Amos Mansdorf	4	5
4	(United States) John McEnroe	6	7
7	(Sweden) Jonas Svensson	2	5
2	(Czechoslovakia) Miloslav Mečíř	6	7

Semifinals
4	(United States) John McEnroe	6	7
2	(Czechoslovakia) Miloslav Mečíř	1	5
