= 1987 Fila Trophy – Singles =

Singles
- 1987 Fila Trophy

Final
- Champion: (Germany) Boris Becker
- Runner-up: (Czechoslovakia) Miloslav Mečíř
- Score: 6–4, 6–3

Details
- Draw: 32 (3WC/4Q)
- Seeds: 8

Events
| Singles | Doubles |
- Milan Indoor

Ivan Lendl was the defending champion, but did not compete this year.

Boris Becker won the title by defeating Miloslav Mečíř 6–4, 6–3 in the final.

== Seeds ==
1. (West Germany) Boris Becker (champion)
2. (Czechoslovakia) Miloslav Mečíř (final)
3. (Sweden) Mats Wilander (semifinals)
4. (Australia) Pat Cash (first round)
5. (Spain) Emilio Sánchez (quarterfinals)
6. (Sweden) Jonas Svensson (first round)
7. (Switzerland) Jakob Hlasek (quarterfinals)
8. (Sweden) Anders Järryd (second round)

== Draw ==
Key

- Q = Qualifier
- WC = Wild card
- LL = Lucky loser
- Alt = Alternate
- ITF = ITF entry
- PR = Protected ranking
- SR = Special ranking
- SE = Special exempt
- JE = Junior exempt
- JR = Junior Accelerator Programme entrant
- CO = College Accelerator Programme entrant
- NG = Next Gen Accelerator Program entrant
- w/o = Walkover
- r = Retired
- d = Defaulted

=== Finals ===
Semifinals
1 | (West Germany) Boris Becker | 6 | 3 | 6
(Socialist Federal Republic of Yugoslavia) Slobodan Živojinović | 2 | 6 | 2
3/WC | (Sweden) Mats Wilander | 0 | 2
2 | (Czechoslovakia) Miloslav Mečíř | 6 | 6

Final
1 | (West Germany) Boris Becker | 6 | 6
2 | (Czechoslovakia) Miloslav Mečíř | 4 | 3

=== Top half ===
First round
1 | (West Germany) B Becker | 6 | 6
(Czechoslovakia) S Birner | 1 | 3
(Spain) S Casal | 6 | 6
Q | (Israel) S Glickstein | 2 | 3
(Italy) S Colombo | 2 | 3
(Netherlands) M Schapers | 6 | 6
(Czechoslovakia) M Vajda | 3 | 6
7 | (Switzerland) J Hlasek | 6 | 7
4 | (Australia) P Cash | 3 | 6
(Italy) P Canè | 6 | 7
Q | (Italy) L Bottazzi | 6 | 2 | 1
(Australia) B Dyke | 4 | 6 | 6
(Australia) M Kratzmann | 5 | 4
(Australia) B Drewett | 7 | 6
(Socialist Federal Republic of Yugoslavia) S Živojinović | 6 | 6 | 6
6 | (Sweden) J Svensson | 7 | 3 | 2

Second round
1 | (West Germany) B Becker | 6 | 6
(Spain) S Casal | 2 | 4
(Netherlands) M Schapers | 3 | 5
7 | (Switzerland) J Hlasek | 6 | 7
(Italy) P Canè | 6 | 6
(Australia) B Dyke | 1 | 2
(Australia) B Drewett | 6 | 3
(Socialist Federal Republic of Yugoslavia) S Živojinović | 7 | 6

Quarterfinals
1 | (West Germany) B Becker | 6 | 6
7 | (Switzerland) J Hlasek | 4 | 2
(Italy) P Canè | 1 | 1
(Socialist Federal Republic of Yugoslavia) S Živojinović | 6 | 6

Semifinals
1 | (West Germany) B Becker | 6 | 3 | 6
(Socialist Federal Republic of Yugoslavia) S Živojinović | 2 | 6 | 2

=== Bottom half ===
First round
5 | (Spain) E Sánchez | 4 | 6 | 6
Q | (Australia) L Warder | 6 | 2 | 3
WC | (Italy) C Panatta | 3 | 6 | 6
(India) R Krishnan | 6 | 1 | 4
(Sweden) J Gunnarsson | 6 | 6
WC | (United States) C Hooper | 4 | 4
(Austria) H Skoff | 3 | 7 | 3
3/WC | (Sweden) M Wilander | 6 | 6 | 6
8 | (Sweden) A Järryd | 7 | 6
(Australia) W Masur | 6 | 3
(Czechoslovakia) T Šmíd | 6 | 1 | 6
(Israel) A Mansdorf | 3 | 6 | 2
(West Germany) E Jelen | 7 | 6
(Australia) C Limberger | 6 | 1
Q | (Italy) U Colombini | 2 | 3
2 | (Czechoslovakia) M Mečíř | 6 | 6

Second round
5 | (Spain) E Sánchez | 6 | 6
WC | (Italy) C Panatta | 4 | 4
(Sweden) J Gunnarsson | 3 | 4
3/WC | (Sweden) M Wilander | 6 | 6
8 | (Sweden) A Järryd | 5 | 3
(Czechoslovakia) T Šmíd | 7 | 6
(West Germany) E Jelen | 1 | 4
2 | (Czechoslovakia) M Mečíř | 6 | 6

Quarterfinals
5 | (Spain) E Sánchez | 3 | 1
3/WC | (Sweden) M Wilander | 6 | 6
(Czechoslovakia) T Šmíd | 4 | 4
2 | (Czechoslovakia) M Mečíř | 6 | 6

Semifinals
3/WC | (Sweden) M Wilander | 0 | 2
2 | (Czechoslovakia) M Mečíř | 6 | 6
