= 1987 Rado Swiss Open =

- Date: 6–12 July
- Edition: 42nd
- Category: Grand Prix
- Draw: 32S / 16D
- Prize money: $200,000
- Surface: Clay / outdoor
- Location: Gstaad, Switzerland

Champions

Singles
- (Spain) Emilio Sánchez

Doubles
- (Sweden) Jan Gunnarsson / (Czechoslovakia) Tomáš Šmíd
- Suisse Open Gstaad

The 1987 Rado Swiss Open, also known as the Swiss Championships, was a men's tennis tournament held on outdoor clay courts in Gstaad, Switzerland that was part of the 1987 Nabisco Grand Prix. It was the 42nd edition of the tournament and was held from 6 July until 12 July 1987. Third-seeded Emilio Sánchez won the singles title.

== Finals ==
=== Singles ===
(Spain) Emilio Sánchez defeated (Haiti) Ronald Agénor 6–2, 6–3, 7–6^{(7–5)}

- It was Sánchez's 1st singles title of the year and the 4th of his career.

=== Doubles ===
(Sweden) Jan Gunnarsson / (Czechoslovakia) Tomáš Šmíd defeated (France) Loïc Courteau / (France) Guy Forget 7–6, 6–2

- It was Gunnarsson's only doubles title of the year and the 7th of his career. It was Šmíd's 2nd doubles title of the year and the 44th of his career.
