= 1987 Volvo Tennis Los Angeles – Doubles =

Doubles
- 1987 Volvo Tennis Los Angeles

Final
- Champions: (United States) Kevin Curren (United States) David Pate
- Runners-up: (United States) Brad Gilbert (United States) Tim Wilkison
- Score: 6–3, 6–4

Details
- Draw: 16 (1WC)
- Seeds: 4

Events
Singles	Doubles
- Los Angeles Open

Stefan Edberg and Anders Järryd were the defending champions, but none competed this year. Edberg chose to compete only in the singles tournament, finishing at runner-up.

Kevin Curren and David Pate won the title by defeating Brad Gilbert and Tim Wilkison 6–3, 6–4 in the final.

== Seeds ==
1. (United States) Gary Donnelly / (United States) Peter Fleming (first round)
2. (France) Guy Forget / (Australia) Kim Warwick (quarterfinals)
3. (United States) Paul Annacone / (United States) Mike De Palmer (first round)
4. (United States) Chip Hooper / (United States) Mike Leach (first round)

== Draw ==
Key

- Q = Qualifier
- WC = Wild card
- LL = Lucky loser
- Alt = Alternate
- ITF = ITF entry
- PR = Protected ranking
- SR = Special ranking
- SE = Special exempt
- JE = Junior exempt
- JR = Junior Accelerator Programme entrant
- CO = College Accelerator Programme entrant
- NG = Next Gen Accelerator Program entrant
- w/o = Walkover
- r = Retired
- d = Defaulted

=== Draw ===
First round
1	(United States) G Donnelly (United States) P Fleming	7	3	6
(United States) R Leach (United States) T Pawsat	6	6	7
(United States) K Jones (United States) S Stewart	4	7	6
WC	(United Kingdom) J Lloyd (United States) V Van Patten	6	5	1
4	(United States) C Hooper (United States) M Leach	6	4	3
(United States) B Gilbert (United States) T Wilkison	3	6	6
(United States) B Pearce (United States) J Pugh	6	7	7
(United States) S Denton (United States) S Giammalva Jr.	7	6	5
(United States) R Baxter (United States) P McEnroe	6	2	0
(United States) K Curren (United States) D Pate	1	6	6
(United States) A Kohlberg (United States) R Van't Hof	6	7
3	(United States) P Annacone (United States) M De Palmer	3	6
(United States) L Bourne (United States) J Klaparda	3	6	6
(Mexico) J Lozano (United States) T Witsken	6	4	7
(South Africa) C Steyn (South Africa) D Visser	6	4
2	(France) G Forget (Australia) K Warwick	7	6

Quarterfinals
(United States) R Leach (United States) T Pawsat	5	3
(United States) K Jones (United States) S Stewart	7	6
(United States) B Gilbert (United States) T Wilkison	6	7
(United States) B Pearce (United States) J Pugh	4	5
(United States) K Curren (United States) D Pate	1	6	7
(United States) A Kohlberg (United States) R Van't Hof	6	3	6
(Mexico) J Lozano (United States) T Witsken	7	7
2	(France) G Forget (Australia) K Warwick	6	6

Semifinals
(United States) K Jones (United States) S Stewart	4	5
(United States) B Gilbert (United States) T Wilkison	6	7
(United States) K Curren (United States) D Pate	7	6
(Mexico) J Lozano (United States) T Witsken	5	2

Final
(United States) B Gilbert (United States) T Wilkison	3	4
(United States) K Curren (United States) D Pate	6	6
