= 1987 Fila Trophy – Doubles =

Doubles
- 1987 Fila Trophy

Final
- Champions: (Germany) Boris Becker (Socialist Federal Republic of Yugoslavia) Slobodan Živojinović
- Runners-up: (Spain) Sergio Casal (Spain) Emilio Sánchez
- Score: 3–6, 6–3, 6–4

Details
- Draw: 16 (1WC)
- Seeds: 4

Events
Singles	Doubles
- Milan Indoor

Colin Dowdeswell and Christo Steyn were the defending champions, but none competed this year. Dowdeswell retired from professional tennis at the end of the 1986 season, while Steyn chose to compete at Chicago during the same week.

Boris Becker and Slobodan Živojinović won the title by defeating Sergio Casal and Emilio Sánchez 3–6, 6–3, 6–4 in the final.

== Seeds ==
1. (West Germany) Boris Becker / (Socialist Federal Republic of Yugoslavia) Slobodan Živojinović (champions)
2. (Spain) Sergio Casal / (Spain) Emilio Sánchez (final)
3. (Switzerland) Jakob Hlasek / (United States) Chip Hooper (semifinals)
4. (Czechoslovakia) Miloslav Mečíř / (Czechoslovakia) Tomáš Šmíd (semifinals)

== Draw ==
Key

- Q = Qualifier
- WC = Wild card
- LL = Lucky loser
- Alt = Alternate
- ITF = ITF entry
- PR = Protected ranking
- SR = Special ranking
- SE = Special exempt
- JE = Junior exempt
- JR = Junior Accelerator Programme entrant
- CO = College Accelerator Programme entrant
- NG = Next Gen Accelerator Program entrant
- w/o = Walkover
- r = Retired
- d = Defaulted

=== Draw ===
First round
1	(West Germany) B Becker (Socialist Federal Republic of Yugoslavia) S Živojinović	6	6
WC	(Spain) Florentino Anda (Spain) T Carbonell	1	3
(Italy) U Colombini (Austria) H Skoff	6	4	6
(Italy) P Canè (Italy) S Colombo	4	6	7
4	(Czechoslovakia) M Mečíř (Czechoslovakia) T Šmíd	6	6
(Australia) B Dyke (Australia) W Masur	4	3
(Italy) C Panatta (Netherlands) M Schapers	6	6
(Italy) L Bottazzi (Italy) P Parrini	3	4
(India) R Krishnan (Italy) G Ocleppo	3	4
(Sweden) J Gunnarsson (West Germany) E Jelen	6	6
(Australia) D Cahill (Australia) M Kratzmann	1	4
3	(Switzerland) J Hlasek (United States) C Hooper	6	6
(Australia) B Drewett (Australia) L Warder	4	6	4
(Czechoslovakia) S Birner (Australia) C Limberger	6	2	6
(Australia) A Emerson (Australia) D Tyson	3	4
2	(Spain) S Casal (Spain) E Sánchez	6	6

Quarterfinals
1	(West Germany) B Becker (Socialist Federal Republic of Yugoslavia) S Živojinović	7	6
(Italy) P Canè (Italy) S Colombo	6	4
4	(Czechoslovakia) M Mečíř (Czechoslovakia) T Šmíd	6	2	7
(Italy) C Panatta (Netherlands) M Schapers	3	6	6
(Sweden) J Gunnarsson (West Germany) E Jelen	6	2	6
3	(Switzerland) J Hlasek (United States) C Hooper	2	6	7
(Czechoslovakia) S Birner (Australia) C Limberger	3	1
2	(Spain) S Casal (Spain) E Sánchez	6	6

Semifinals
1	(West Germany) B Becker (Socialist Federal Republic of Yugoslavia) S Živojinović	6	6
4	(Czechoslovakia) M Mečíř (Czechoslovakia) T Šmíd	2	4
3	(Switzerland) J Hlasek (United States) C Hooper	5	4
2	(Spain) S Casal (Spain) E Sánchez	7	6

Final
1	(West Germany) B Becker (Socialist Federal Republic of Yugoslavia) S Živojinović	3	6	6
2	(Spain) S Casal (Spain) E Sánchez	6	3	4
