= 1987 ABN World Tennis Tournament – Doubles =

Doubles
- 1987 ABN World Tennis Tournament

Final
- Champions: (Sweden) Stefan Edberg (Sweden) Anders Järryd
- Runners-up: (United States) Chip Hooper (United States) Mike Leach
- Score: 3–6, 6–3, 6–4

Details
- Draw: 16
- Seeds: 4

Events
| Singles | Doubles |
- Rotterdam Open

Stefan Edberg and Slobodan Živojinović were the defending champions, but Živojinović decided to rest after competing in the Davis Cup the previous week.

Edberg teamed up with Anders Järryd and successfully defended his title, by defeating Chip Hooper and Mike Leach 3–6, 6–3, 6–4 in the final.

== Seeds ==
1. (Sweden) Stefan Edberg / (Sweden) Anders Järryd (champions)
2. (United States) Peter Fleming / (United States) John McEnroe (semifinals)
3. (France) Guy Forget / (Switzerland) Jakob Hlasek (quarterfinals)
4. (United States) Chip Hooper / (United States) Mike Leach (final)

== Draw ==
Key

- Q = Qualifier
- WC = Wild card
- LL = Lucky loser
- Alt = Alternate
- ITF = ITF entry
- PR = Protected ranking
- SR = Special ranking
- SE = Special exempt
- JE = Junior exempt
- JR = Junior Accelerator Programme entrant
- CO = College Accelerator Programme entrant
- NG = Next Gen Accelerator Program entrant
- w/o = Walkover
- r = Retired
- d = Defaulted

=== Draw ===
First round
1 | (Sweden) S Edberg (Sweden) A Järryd | 6 | 7 | 6
(Czech Republic) K Nováček (Sweden) M Pernfors | 7 | 6 | 1
WC | (Netherlands) M Oosting (Netherlands) H van Boeckel | 3 | 4
(Australia) A Emerson (Australia) D Tyson | 6 | 6
3 | (France) G Forget (Switzerland) J Hlasek | 7 | 6
(United States) J Grabb (Israel) A Mansdorf | 6 | 3
(Australia) D Cahill (Australia) B Dyke | 6 | 3 | 4
(Czechoslovakia) M Mečíř (Czechoslovakia) T Šmid | 3 | 6 | 6
(Sweden) J Nyström (Sweden) J Svensson | 6 | 6
(Czechoslovakia) S Birner (Brazil) J Soares | 4 | 2
(Australia) C Limberger (Australia) M Woodforde | 3 | 4
4 | (United States) C Hooper (United States) M Leach | 6 | 6
(Israel) G Bloom (Netherlands) M Schapers | 6 | 7 | 7
(Iran) M Bahrami (United States) C Cox | 7 | 6 | 5
(Australia) B Drewett (Australia) L Warder | 0 | 2
2 | (United States) P Fleming (United States) J McEnroe | 6 | 6

Quarterfinals
1 | (Sweden) S Edberg (Sweden) A Järryd | 6 | 6
(Australia) A Emerson (Australia) D Tyson | 4 | 4
3 | (France) G Forget (Switzerland) J Hlasek | 6 | 6 | 5
(Czechoslovakia) M Mečíř (Czechoslovakia) T Šmid | 4 | 7 | 7
(Sweden) J Nyström (Sweden) J Svensson | 6 | 1 | 0
4 | (United States) C Hooper (United States) M Leach | 4 | 6 | 6
(Israel) G Bloom (Netherlands) M Schapers | 4 | 4
2 | (United States) P Fleming (United States) J McEnroe | 6 | 6

Semifinals
1 | (Sweden) S Edberg (Sweden) A Järryd | 6 | 6
(Czechoslovakia) M Mečíř (Czechoslovakia) T Šmid | 1 | 2
4 | (United States) C Hooper (United States) M Leach | 6 | 6
2 | (United States) P Fleming (United States) J McEnroe | 4 | 4

Final
1 | (Sweden) S Edberg (Sweden) A Järryd | 3 | 6 | 6
4 | (United States) C Hooper (United States) M Leach | 6 | 3 | 4
