= 1988 Ebel Swiss Indoors =

1988 Swiss Indoors
- Date: 4–9 October
- Edition: 19th
- Category: Grand Prix
- Draw: 32S / 16D
- Prize money: $240,000
- Surface: Carpet / indoor
- Location: Basel, Switzerland
- Venue: St. Jakobshalle

Champions

Singles
- (Sweden) Stefan Edberg

Doubles
- (Switzerland) Jakob Hlasek / (Czechoslovakia) Tomáš Šmíd
- Swiss Indoors

The 1988 Ebel Swiss Indoors was a men's tennis tournament played on indoor carpet courts at the St. Jakobshalle in Basel, Switzerland that was part of the 1988 Nabisco Grand Prix circuit. It was the 19th edition of the tournament and took place from 4 October until 9 October 1988. First-seeded Stefan Edberg who entered on a wildcard won the singles title.

== Finals ==
=== Singles ===
(Sweden) Stefan Edberg defeated (Switzerland) Jakob Hlasek 7–5, 6–3, 3–6, 6–2

- It was Edberg's 3rd singles title of the year and the 18th of his career.

=== Doubles ===
(Switzerland) Jakob Hlasek / (Czechoslovakia) Tomáš Šmíd defeated (United Kingdom) Jeremy Bates / (Sweden) Peter Lundgren 6–3, 6–1

- It was Hlasek's only doubles title of the year and the 4th of his career. It was Šmíd's 2nd and last doubles title of the year and the 51st of his career.
