= 1988 Ebel U.S. Pro Indoor – Singles =

Singles
- 1988 Ebel U.S. Pro Indoor

Final
- Champion: (United States) Tim Mayotte
- Runner-up: (Australia) John Fitzgerald
- Score: 4–6, 6–2, 6–2, 6–3

Details
- Draw: 48
- Seeds: 16

Events
Singles	Doubles
← 1987 ·	U.S. Pro Indoor	· 1989 →

Tim Mayotte was the defending champion.

Mayotte successfully defended his title, defeating John Fitzgerald, 4–6, 6–2, 6–2, 6–3 in the final.

== Seeds ==
1. (Czechoslovakia) Ivan Lendl (third round)
2. (United States) Tim Mayotte (champion)
3. (United States) Eliot Teltscher (second round)
4. (Argentina) Eduardo Bengoechea (second round)
5. (Israel) Amos Mansdorf (second round)
6. (South Africa) Christo van Rensburg (semifinals)
7. (Sweden) Peter Lundgren (second round)
8. (Czechoslovakia) Tomáš Šmíd (second round)
9. (United States) Kevin Curren (quarterfinals)
10. (New Zealand) Kelly Evernden (second round)
11. (United States) Paul Annacone (third round)
12. (United States) Jim Pugh (third round)
13. (Australia) Mark Woodforde (second round)
14. (United States) Dan Goldie (quarterfinals)
15. (United States) Johan Kriek (third round)
16. (Australia) John Fitzgerald (final)

== Draw ==
=== Key ===
- Q = Qualifier
- WC = Wild card
- LL = Lucky loser
- Alt = Alternate
- SE = Special exempt
- PR = Protected ranking
- ITF = ITF entry
- JE = Junior exempt
- w/o = Walkover
- r = Retired
- d = Defaulted
- SR = Special ranking

=== Finals ===
Semifinals
16	(Australia) John Fitzgerald	6	6
(Mexico) Jorge Lozano	1	4
6/WC	(South Africa) Christo van Rensburg	2	5
2	(United States) Tim Mayotte	6	7

Final
16	(Australia) John Fitzgerald	6	2	2	3
2	(United States) Tim Mayotte	4	6	6	6

=== Top half ===
==== Section 1 ====
First round
(United States) R Reneberg	6	7
(United States) J Ross	3	5
Q	(Australia) D Macpherson	3	2
(West Germany) D Keretić	6	6
(Canada) C Pridham	7	6
WC	(United States) L Scott	5	3
(United States) M Davis	7	6
(United States) G Holmes	5	2

Second round
1	(Czechoslovakia) I Lendl	6	6
(United States) R Reneberg	2	2
(West Germany) D Keretić	1	6
16	(Australia) J Fitzgerald	6	7
9	(United States) K Curren	7	6
(Canada) C Pridham	6	3
(United States) M Davis	6	7	7
7	(Sweden) P Lundgren	7	5	6

Third round
1	(Czechoslovakia) I Lendl	6	4
16	(Australia) J Fitzgerald	7	6
9	(United States) K Curren	6	6
(United States) M Davis	3	3

Quarterfinals
16	(Australia) J Fitzgerald	5	6	6
9	(United States) K Curren	7	4	3

==== Section 2 ====
First round
(United States) J Rive	7	6
Q	(South Africa) D Visser	6	1
(United States) L Duncan	4	3
(Canada) G Connell	6	6
(Australia) B Dyke	6	2	7
WC	(United States) M Flur	4	6	6
(Australia) W Masur	4	2
(Mexico) J Lozano	6	6

Second round
3	(United States) E Teltscher	6	2	3
(United States) J Rive	4	6	6
(Canada) G Connell	6	5	4
14	(United States) D Goldie	3	7	6
12	(United States) J Pugh	6	6
(Australia) B Dyke	4	2
(Mexico) J Lozano	7	7
5	(Israel) A Mansdorf	6	6

Third round
(United States) J Rive	6	3	2
14	(United States) D Goldie	3	6	6
12	(United States) J Pugh	3	7	4
(Mexico) J Lozano	6	6	6

Quarterfinals
14	(United States) D Goldie	6	1	4
(Mexico) J Lozano	4	6	6

=== Bottom half ===
==== Section 3 ====
First round
WC	(United States) T Wilkison	4	3
(United States) A Krickstein	6	6
(United States) S Davis	3	4
(United States) J Brown	6	6
Q	(United States) P Sampras	4	3
(United States) S Giammalva Jr.	6	6
Q	(Sweden) P Lindgren	6	1	6
(United States) D Rostagno	4	6	3

Second round
6/WC	(South Africa) C van Rensburg	7	6
(United States) A Krickstein	6	2
(United States) J Brown	1	6	2
11	(United States) P Annacone	6	3	6
13	(Australia) M Woodforde	6	3	6
(United States) S Giammalva Jr.	2	6	7
Q	(Sweden) P Lindgren	6	6
4	(Argentina) E Bengoechea	1	0

Third round
6/WC	(South Africa) C van Rensburg	6	5	6
11	(United States) P Annacone	1	7	4
(United States) S Giammalva Jr.	6	6
Q	(Sweden) P Lindgren	3	3

Quarterfinals
6/WC	(South Africa) C van Rensburg	7	6
(United States) S Giammalva Jr.	6	2

==== Section 4 ====
First round
(United States) J Grabb	7	6
Q	(South Africa) B Moir	6	1
(United States) K Flach	6	6	7
(Czechoslovakia) B Stankovič	7	3	6
(United States) D Cassidy	6	2	3
(South Africa) G Muller	2	6	6
(Argentina) H de la Peña	1	4
Q	(United States) L Shiras	6	6

Second round
8	(Czechoslovakia) T Šmíd	4	7	3
(United States) J Grabb	6	6	6
(United States) K Flach	7	0	6
10	(New Zealand) K Evernden	5	6	3
15	(United States) J Kriek	6	6
(South Africa) G Muller	2	2
Q	(United States) L Shiras	4	4
2	(United States) T Mayotte	6	6

Third round
(United States) J Grabb	6	2	7
(United States) K Flach	2	6	5
15	(United States) J Kriek	7	2	5
2	(United States) T Mayotte	5	6	7

Quarterfinals
(United States) J Grabb	5	6	4
2	(United States) T Mayotte	7	3	6
