= 1987 Ebel U.S. Pro Indoor =

- Date: February 2–9
- Edition: 20th
- Category: Grand Prix circuit
- Draw: 48S / 24D
- Prize money: $375,000
- Surface: Carpet / indoor
- Location: Philadelphia, United States
- Venue: Spectrum

Champions

Singles
- (United States) Tim Mayotte

Doubles
- (Spain) Sergio Casal / (Spain) Emilio Sánchez
← 1986 ·	U.S. Pro Indoor	· 1988 →

The 1987 Ebel U.S. Pro Indoor was a men's tennis tournament played on indoor carpet courts that was part of the 1987 Nabisco Grand Prix. It was the 20th edition of the tournament and was played at the Spectrum in Philadelphia, Pennsylvania in the United States from February 2 to February 9, 1987. Fifth-seeded Tim Mayotte won the singles title.

== Finals ==
=== Singles ===
(United States) Tim Mayotte defeated (United States) John McEnroe 3–6, 6–1, 6–3, 6–1

- It was Mayotte's 1st title of the year and the 4th of his career.

=== Doubles ===
(Spain) Sergio Casal / (Spain) Emilio Sánchez defeated (South Africa) Christo Steyn / (South Africa) Danie Visser 3–6, 6–1, 7–6

- It was Casal's 1st title of the year and the 10th of his career. It was Sanchez's 1st title of the year and the 12th of his career.
