= 1986 Ebel U.S. Pro Indoor – Doubles =

Doubles
- 1986 Ebel U.S. Pro Indoor

Final
- Champions: (United States) Scott Davis; (United States) David Pate
- Runners-up: (Sweden) Stefan Edberg; (Sweden) Anders Järryd
- Score: 7–6, 3–6, 6–3, 7–5

Events
Singles	Doubles
← 1985 ·	Ebel U.S. Pro Indoor	· 1987 →

Joakim Nyström and Mats Wilander were the defending champions, but did not participate this year.

Scott Davis and Stefan Edberg won the title, defeating Anders Järryd and Danie Visser 7–6, 3–6, 6–3, 7–5 in the final.

== Seeds ==
All seeds receive a bye into the second round.

1. (United States) Ken Flach / (United States) Robert Seguso (semifinals)
2. (Sweden) Stefan Edberg / (Sweden) Anders Järryd (final)
3. (Australia) John Fitzgerald / (Czechoslovakia) Tomáš Šmíd (semifinals)
4. (Ecuador) Andrés Gómez / (France) Yannick Noah (quarterfinals, withdrew)
5. (United States) Scott Davis / (United States) David Pate (champions)
6. (United States) Paul Annacone / (United States) Sherwood Stewart (quarterfinals)
7. (Spain) Sergio Casal / (Spain) Emilio Sánchez (second round)
8. (France) Guy Forget / (Socialist Federal Republic of Yugoslavia) Slobodan Živojinović (quarterfinals)

== Draw ==
=== Key ===
- Q = Qualifier
- WC = Wild card
- LL = Lucky loser
- Alt = Alternate
- SE = Special exempt
- PR = Protected ranking
- ITF = ITF entry
- JE = Junior exempt
- w/o = Walkover
- r = Retired
- d = Defaulted
- SR = Special ranking

=== Finals ===
Semifinals

Final

1
- (United States) Ken Flach
- (United States) Robert Seguso
4
4

5
- (United States) Scott Davis
- (United States) David Pate
6
6

5
- (United States) Scott Davis
- (United States) David Pate
7
3
6
7

2
- (Sweden) Stefan Edberg
- (Sweden) Anders Järryd
6
6
3
5

3
- (Australia) John Fitzgerald
- (Czechoslovakia) Tomáš Šmíd
6
6

2
- (Sweden) Stefan Edberg
- (Sweden) Anders Järryd
7
7

=== Top half ===
First round

Second round

Quarterfinals

Semifinals

1
- (United States) K Flach
- (United States) R Seguso
6
6

- (United States) A Kohlberg
- (United States) R Van't Hof
7
6

- (United States) A Kohlberg
- (United States) R Van't Hof
2
2

WC
- (United States) B Gilbert
- (United States) V Van Patten
6
4

1
- (United States) K Flach
- (United States) R Seguso
6
6

- (United States) C Dunk
- (United States) S Giammalva Jr.
4
4

8
- (France) G Forget
- (Socialist Federal Republic of Yugoslavia) S Živojinović
3
2

- (United States) K Curren
- (United States) S Denton
6
6

- (United States) K Curren
- (United States) S Denton
5
6

8
- (France) G Forget
- (Socialist Federal Republic of Yugoslavia) S Živojinović
7
7

1
- (United States) K Flach
- (United States) R Seguso
4
4

5
- (United States) S Davis
- (United States) D Pate
6
6

4
- (Ecuador) A Gómez
- (France) Y Noah
6
6

- (Switzerland) J Hlasek
- (Czechoslovakia) P Složil
7
3
4

WC
- (United States) T Mayotte
- (United States) B Schultz
4
1

WC
- (United States) T Mayotte
- (United States) B Schultz
5
6
6

4
- (Ecuador) A Gómez
- (France) Y Noah

- (United States) Ti Gullikson
- (United States) To Gullikson
6
6
6

5
- (United States) S Davis
- (United States) D Pate
w/o

- (United States) D Dowlen
- (Nigeria) N Odizor
4
7
4

- (United States) Ti Gullikson
- (United States) To Gullikson
3
3

5
- (United States) S Davis
- (United States) D Pate
6
6

=== Bottom half ===
First round

Second round

Quarterfinals

Semifinals

6
- (United States) P Annacone
- (United States) S Stewart
6
6

- (Chile) R Acuña
- (South Africa) E Edwards
5
3

- (Poland) W Fibak
- (United States) M Mitchell
2
3

- (Poland) W Fibak
- (United States) M Mitchell
7
6

6
- (United States) P Annacone
- (United States) S Stewart
2
6

- (United States) M De Palmer
- (United States) G Donnelly
4
7
3

3
- (Australia) J Fitzgerald
- (Czechoslovakia) T Šmíd
6
7

- (Sweden) J Gunnarsson
- (Denmark) M Mortensen
6
6
6

- (Sweden) J Gunnarsson
- (Denmark) M Mortensen
3
4

3
- (Australia) J Fitzgerald
- (Czechoslovakia) T Šmíd
6
6

3
- (Australia) J Fitzgerald
- (Czechoslovakia) T Šmíd
6
6

2
- (Sweden) S Edberg
- (Sweden) A Järryd
7
7

7
- (Spain) S Casal
- (Spain) E Sánchez
4
7
3

- (Netherlands) T Nijssen
- (Israel) S Perkiss
6
5

- (United States) M Dickson
- (United States) T Wilkison
6
6
6

- (United States) M Dickson
- (United States) T Wilkison
7
7

- (United States) M Dickson
- (United States) T Wilkison
2
4

- (United States) M Robertson
- (United States) T Warneke
6
3
6

2
- (Sweden) S Edberg
- (Sweden) A Järryd
6
6

- (Australia) D Graham
- (Czechoslovakia) L Pimek
1
6
2

- (United States) M Robertson
- (United States) T Warneke
4
4

2
- (Sweden) S Edberg
- (Sweden) A Järryd
6
6
