= 1989 Ebel U.S. Pro Indoor – Singles =

Singles
- 1989 Ebel U.S. Pro Indoor

Final
- Champion: (West Germany) Boris Becker
- Runner-up: (United States) Tim Mayotte
- Score: 7–6, 6–1, 6–3

Details
- Draw: 48
- Seeds: 16

Events
Singles	Doubles
← 1988 ·	U.S. Pro Indoor	· 1990 →

Tim Mayotte was the defending champion but lost in the final 7–6, 6–1, 6–3 against Boris Becker.

== Seeds ==
All sixteen seeds received a bye to the second round.

1. (United States) Andre Agassi (semifinals)
2. (West Germany) Boris Becker (champion)
3. (United States) Tim Mayotte (final)
4. (Sweden) Mikael Pernfors (semifinals)
5. (United States) Brad Gilbert (quarterfinals)
6. (United States) Kevin Curren (third round)
7. (Israel) Amos Mansdorf (third round)
8. (United States) Dan Goldie (quarterfinals)
9. (United States) Michael Chang (third round)
10. (South Africa) Christo van Rensburg (quarterfinals)
11. (United States) Robert Seguso (quarterfinals)
12. (United States) Paul Annacone (third round)
13. (United States) Derrick Rostagno (second round)
14. (United States) ~~Johan Kriek~~ (withdrew)
15. (United States) Jim Courier (third round)
16. (United States) David Pate (third round)

== Draw ==
=== Key ===
- Q = Qualifier
- WC = Wild card
- LL = Lucky loser
- Alt = Alternate
- SE = Special exempt
- PR = Protected ranking
- ITF = ITF entry
- JE = Junior exempt
- w/o = Walkover
- r = Retired
- d = Defaulted
- SR = Special ranking

=== Finals ===
Semifinals
1	(United States) Andre Agassi	4	6	4
3	(United States) Tim Mayotte	6	4	6
4	(Sweden) Mikael Pernfors	2	3
2	(West Germany) Boris Becker	6	6

Final
3	(United States) Tim Mayotte	6	1	3
2	(West Germany) Boris Becker	7	6	6

=== Top half ===
==== Section 1 ====
First round
(Finland) V Paloheimo	6	6
(Australia) S Youl	4	4
(India) R Krishnan	1	7	3
(United States) M Davis	6	6	0^{r}
(United States) J Grabb	3	6	6
WC	(United States) R Reneberg	6	3	7
Q	(Venezuela) N Pereira	7	6
Q	(United States) M Kures	6	3

Second round
1	(United States) A Agassi	6	6
(Finland) V Paloheimo	3	2
(India) R Krishnan
15	(United States) J Courier	w/o
9	(United States) M Chang	6	7
WC	(United States) R Reneberg	1	5
Q	(Venezuela) N Pereira	2	6
8	(United States) D Goldie	6	7

Third round
1	(United States) A Agassi	6	7
15	(United States) J Courier	3	6
9	(United States) M Chang	6	4	2
8	(United States) D Goldie	2	6	6

Quarterfinals
1	(United States) A Agassi	6	6
8	(United States) D Goldie	1	4

==== Section 2 ====
First round
(Netherlands) T Nijssen	6	6
Q	(United States) J Canter	2	2
(Japan) S Matsuoka	6	3	4
(Czechoslovakia) M Šrejber	3	6	6
(United States) J Rive	6	6
Q	(United States) K Thorne	4	2
(Mexico) J Lozano	6	3	6
WC	(United States) K Flach	4	6	7

Second round
3	(United States) T Mayotte	6	6
(Netherlands) T Nijssen	4	2
(Czechoslovakia) M Šrejber	6	6
13	(United States) D Rostagno	3	4
12	(United States) P Annacone	6	6
(United States) J Rive	0	3
WC	(United States) K Flach	2	6
5	(United States) B Gilbert	6	7

Third round
3	(United States) T Mayotte	6	6
(Czechoslovakia) M Šrejber	3	4
12	(United States) P Annacone	6	5
5	(United States) B Gilbert	7	7

Quarterfinals
3	(United States) T Mayotte	6	5	6
5	(United States) B Gilbert	4	7	4

=== Bottom half ===
==== Section 3 ====
First round
(Brazil) D Marcelino	5	4
(United States) L Shiras	7	6
(United States) S Davis	6	6
WC	(Socialist Federal Republic of Yugoslavia) G Ivanišević	3	4
(South Africa) P Aldrich	1	2
(West Germany) M Westphal	6	6
(United States) J Pugh	6	7
(United States) T Wilkison	3	6

Second round
6	(United States) K Curren	4
(United States) L Shiras	1^{r}
(United States) S Davis	2	2
11	(United States) R Seguso	6	6
LL	(The Bahamas) R Smith	6	0	6
(West Germany) M Westphal	4	6	4
(United States) J Pugh	3	5
4	(Sweden) M Pernfors	6	7

Third round
6	(United States) K Curren	3	7	5
11	(United States) R Seguso	6	6	7
LL	(The Bahamas) R Smith	1	3
4	(Sweden) M Pernfors	6	6

Quarterfinals
11	(United States) R Seguso	4	3
4	(Sweden) M Pernfors	6	6

==== Section 4 ====
First round
Q	(United States) R Weiss	5	3
Q	(United States) J Letts	7	6
(United States) S Giammalva Jr.	6	6
(Canada) G Michibata	0	1
(Argentina) H de la Peña	3	4
(United States) P Sampras	6	6
WC	(United States) D Wheaton	6	6
(Australia) J Stoltenberg	4	2

Second round
7	(Israel) A Mansdorf	6	6
Q	(United States) J Letts	4	3
(United States) S Giammalva Jr.	3	7	6
10	(South Africa) C van Rensburg	6	5	7
16	(United States) D Pate	2	7	6
(United States) P Sampras	6	6	3
WC	(United States) D Wheaton	1	4
2	(West Germany) B Becker	6	6

Third round
7	(Israel) A Mansdorf	7	4	4
10	(South Africa) C van Rensburg	6	6	6
16	(United States) D Pate	1	1
2	(West Germany) B Becker	6	6

Quarterfinals
10	(South Africa) C van Rensburg	6	1	4
2	(West Germany) B Becker	3	6	6
