= 1989 Ebel U.S. Pro Indoor – Doubles =

Doubles
- 1989 Ebel U.S. Pro Indoor

Final
- Champions: (United States) Paul Annacone; (South Africa) Christo van Rensburg
- Runners-up: (United States) Rick Leach; (United States) Jim Pugh
- Score: 6–3, 7–5

Events
Singles	Doubles
← 1988 ·	U.S. Pro Indoor	· 1990 →

Kelly Evernden and Johan Kriek were the defending champions but did not compete that year.

Paul Annacone and Christo van Rensburg won in the final 6–3, 7–5 against Rick Leach and Jim Pugh.

== Seeds ==
All eight seeded teams received byes to the second round.

1. (United States) Ken Flach / (United States) Robert Seguso (quarterfinals)
2. (United States) Rick Leach / (United States) Jim Pugh (final)
3. (United States) Kevin Curren / (United States) David Pate (semifinals)
4. (Mexico) Jorge Lozano / (United States) Todd Witsken (semifinals)
5. (South Africa) Pieter Aldrich / (South Africa) Danie Visser (quarterfinals)
6. (United States) Jim Grabb / (United States) Patrick McEnroe (quarterfinals)
7. (United States) Paul Annacone / (South Africa) Christo van Rensburg (champions)
8. (Canada) Grant Connell / (Canada) Glenn Michibata (quarterfinals)

== Draw ==
=== Key ===
- Q = Qualifier
- WC = Wild card
- LL = Lucky loser
- Alt = Alternate
- SE = Special exempt
- PR = Protected ranking
- ITF = ITF entry
- JE = Junior exempt
- w/o = Walkover
- r = Retired
- d = Defaulted
- SR = Special ranking

=== Finals ===
Semifinals

Final

7
- (United States) Paul Annacone
- (South Africa) Christo van Rensburg
5
6
6

3
- (United States) Kevin Curren
- (United States) David Pate
7
4
4

7
- (United States) Paul Annacone
- (South Africa) Christo van Rensburg
6
7

2
- (United States) Rick Leach
- (United States) Jim Pugh
3
5

4
- (Mexico) Jorge Lozano
- (United States) Todd Witsken
2
3

2
- (United States) Rick Leach
- (United States) Jim Pugh
6
6

=== Top half ===
First round

Second round

Quarterfinals

Semifinals

1
- (United States) K Flach
- (United States) R Seguso
7
6

- (United States) M Flur
- (United States) R Reneberg
2
3

- (Australia) B Dyke
- (Netherlands) T Nijssen
5
3

- (Australia) B Dyke
- (Netherlands) T Nijssen
6
6

1
- (United States) K Flach
- (United States) R Seguso
6
3
4

- (United States) D Goldie
- (United States) G Van Emburgh
6
4
6

7
- (United States) P Annacone
- (South Africa) C van Rensburg
3
6
6

- (Israel) A Mansdorf
- (Sweden) M Pernfors
1
6
2

- (United States) D Goldie
- (United States) G Van Emburgh

7
- (United States) P Annacone
- (South Africa) C van Rensburg
w/o

7
- (United States) P Annacone
- (South Africa) C van Rensburg
5
6
6

3
- (United States) K Curren
- (United States) D Pate
7
4
4

3
- (United States) K Curren
- (United States) D Pate
7
6
6

- (Japan) S Matsuoka
- (Czechoslovakia) M Šrejber
6
6

- (Japan) S Matsuoka
- (Czechoslovakia) M Šrejber
5
7
4

- (United States) G Donnelly
- (United States) P Sampras
4
0

3
- (United States) K Curren
- (United States) D Pate
6
6

- (United States) M Davis
- (United States) T Pawsat
4
1

6
- (United States) J Grabb
- (United States) P McEnroe
3
2

- (United States) S Davis
- (United States) T Wilkison
6
6

- (United States) S Davis
- (United States) T Wilkison
3
3

6
- (United States) J Grabb
- (United States) P McEnroe
6
6

=== Bottom half ===
First round

Second round

Quarterfinals

Semifinals

5
- (South Africa) P Aldrich
- (South Africa) D Visser
6
6

- (United States) S Giammalva Jr.
- (United States) R Van't Hof
6
4

- (Australia) J Stoltenberg
- (Australia) S Youl
3
3

- (Australia) J Stoltenberg
- (Australia) S Youl
7
6

5
- (South Africa) P Aldrich
- (South Africa) D Visser
4
6

- (United States) M Anger
- (United States) G Holmes
6
7

4
- (Mexico) J Lozano
- (United States) T Witsken
6
7

- (Argentina) H de la Peña
- (Brazil) D Marcelino
2
5

- (United States) M Anger
- (United States) G Holmes
4
2

4
- (Mexico) J Lozano
- (United States) T Witsken
6
6

4
- (Mexico) J Lozano
- (United States) T Witsken
2
3

2
- (United States) R Leach
- (United States) J Pugh
6
6

8
- (Canada) G Connell
- (Canada) G Michibata
6
6
7

- (United States) K Jones
- (United States) J Rive
3
7
6

- (United States) K Jones
- (United States) J Rive
7
4
6

- (United States) J Letts
- (United States) B Man-Son-Hing
6
5
2

8
- (Canada) G Connell
- (Canada) G Michibata
4
1

- (United States) S Stewart
- (United States) B Willenborg
6
3
2

2
- (United States) R Leach
- (United States) J Pugh
6
6

- (South Africa) E Edwards
- (United States) L Shiras
3
6
6

- (South Africa) E Edwards
- (United States) L Shiras

2
- (United States) R Leach
- (United States) J Pugh
w/o
