= 1986 Ebel U.S. Pro Indoor – Singles =

Singles
- 1986 Ebel U.S. Pro Indoor

Final
- Champion: (Czechoslovakia) Ivan Lendl
- Runner-up: (United States) Tim Mayotte
- Score: W/O

Details
- Draw: 48
- Seeds: 16

Events
Singles	Doubles
← 1985 ·	U.S. Pro Indoor	· 1987 →

John McEnroe was the defending champion, but did not participate this year.

Ivan Lendl won the title when Tim Mayotte withdrew prior to the final.

== Seeds ==
1. (Czechoslovakia) Ivan Lendl (champion)
2. (United States) Jimmy Connors (quarterfinals)
3. (Sweden) Stefan Edberg (second round)
4. (France) Yannick Noah (semifinals)
5. (Sweden) Anders Järryd (third round)
6. (United States) Kevin Curren (quarterfinals)
7. (United States) Tim Mayotte (final, withdrew)
8. (United States) Paul Annacone (quarterfinals)
9. (Ecuador) Andrés Gómez (third round)
10. (United States) Scott Davis (second round)
11. (United States) Brad Gilbert (semifinals)
12. (Czechoslovakia) Tomáš Šmíd (third round)
13. (France) Thierry Tulasne (second round)
14. (Sweden) Jan Gunnarsson (second round)
15. (United States) David Pate (second round)
16. (United States) Greg Holmes (third round)

== Draw ==
=== Key ===
- Q = Qualifier
- WC = Wild card
- LL = Lucky loser
- Alt = Alternate
- SE = Special exempt
- PR = Protected ranking
- ITF = ITF entry
- JE = Junior exempt
- w/o = Walkover
- r = Retired
- d = Defaulted
- SR = Special ranking

=== Finals ===
Semifinals
1/WC	(Czechoslovakia) Ivan Lendl	7	4	6
11	(United States) Brad Gilbert	5	6	2
4	(France) Yannick Noah	1	6	4
7	(United States) Tim Mayotte	6	2	6

Final
1/WC	(Czechoslovakia) Ivan Lendl	w/o
7	(United States) Tim Mayotte

=== Top half ===
==== Section 1 ====
First round
(United States) R Seguso	6	6
(Spain) S Casal	4	4
(Belgium) L Pimek	2	6	6
(Czechoslovakia) M Vajda	6	4	1
Q	(Israel) S Perkiss	6	4
Q	(United States) V Van Patten	7	6
WC	(United States) D Goldie	6	7
Q	(Hungary) B Taróczy	2	6

Second round
1/WC	(Czechoslovakia) I Lendl	6	6
(United States) R Seguso	2	2
(Belgium) L Pimek	2	4
16	(United States) G Holmes	6	6
9	(Ecuador) A Gómez	6	7	6
Q	(United States) V Van Patten	7	6	2
WC	(United States) D Goldie	3	4
8	(United States) P Annacone	6	6

Third round
1/WC	(Czechoslovakia) I Lendl	6	6
16	(United States) G Holmes	2	2
9	(Ecuador) A Gómez	1	6	1^{r}
8	(United States) P Annacone	6	3	3

Quarterfinals
1/WC	(Czechoslovakia) I Lendl	6	6
8	(United States) P Annacone	4	4

==== Section 2 ====
First round
WC	(Mexico) L Lavalle	5	7	7
(India) R Krishnan	7	6	6
(Switzerland) J Hlasek	6	6
(United States) T Gullikson	1	1
(Poland) W Fibak	6	6
(United States) S Giammalva Jr.	4	4
(United States) M Anger	6	6	7
(United States) L Stefanki	3	7	6

Second round
3	(Sweden) S Edberg	6	4	5
WC	(Mexico) L Lavalle	1	6	7
(Switzerland) J Hlasek	6	6
14	(Sweden) J Gunnarsson	2	4
11	(United States) B Gilbert	6	6
(Poland) W Fibak	3	1
(United States) M Anger	2	3
5	(Sweden) A Järryd	6	6

Third round
WC	(Mexico) L Lavalle	3	3
(Switzerland) J Hlasek	6	6
11	(United States) B Gilbert	7	6
5	(Sweden) A Järryd	6	0

Quarterfinals
(Switzerland) J Hlasek	7	4	3
11	(United States) B Gilbert	6	6	6

=== Bottom half ===
==== Section 3 ====
First round
Q	(United States) T Warneke	6	6
(United States) T Wilkison	7	7
Q	(Canada) G Michibata	5	3
(Haiti) R Agénor	7	6
WC	(United States) B Testerman	6	6
(United States) A Krickstein	4	4
(United States) B Schultz	4	2
(Chile) R Acuña	6	6

Second round
6	(United States) K Curren	7	6
(United States) T Wilkison	5	2
(Haiti) R Agénor	4	6	3
12	(Czechoslovakia) T Šmíd	6	3	6
13	(France) T Tulasne	7	6	3
WC	(United States) B Testerman	6	7	6
(Chile) R Acuña	3	2
4	(France) Y Noah	6	6

Third round
6	(United States) K Curren	3	6	7
12	(Czechoslovakia) T Šmíd	6	4	6
WC	(United States) B Testerman	3	6
4	(France) Y Noah	6	7

Quarterfinals
6	(United States) K Curren	3	6
4	(France) Y Noah	6	7

==== Section 4 ====
First round
Q	(United States) A Kohlberg	3	6	6
(United States) J Sadri	6	1	4
(United States) M Davis	6	7	6
(United States) M Leach	7	6	2
(Socialist Federal Republic of Yugoslavia) S Živojinović	5	6	6
(United States) K Flach	7	3	3
(France) G Forget	6	6
(West Germany) M Westphal	4	2

Second round
7	(United States) T Mayotte	6	6
Q	(United States) A Kohlberg	2	4
(United States) M Davis	6	7
10	(United States) S Davis	1	6
15	(United States) D Pate	4	7	3
(Socialist Federal Republic of Yugoslavia) S Živojinović	6	6	6
(France) G Forget	3	4
2	(United States) J Connors	6	6

Third round
7	(United States) T Mayotte	6	4	6
(United States) M Davis	4	6	2
(Socialist Federal Republic of Yugoslavia) S Živojinović	1	6
2	(United States) J Connors	6	7

Quarterfinals
7	(United States) T Mayotte	6	6
2	(United States) J Connors	4	2
