= Peter Lindgren (tennis) =

Swedish tennis player

- Full name: Peter Lindgren
- Country (sports): Sweden
- Born: 1 June 1964 (age 60); Stockholm, Sweden
- Height: 5 ft 9 in (175 cm)
- Plays: Right-handed
- Prize money: $45,230

Singles
- Career record: 4–18
- Highest ranking: No. 119 (2 May 1988)

Grand Slam singles results
- Wimbledon: 1R (1988)

Doubles
- Career record: 1–2
- Highest ranking: No. 302 (10 August 1987)

Peter Lindgren (born 1 June 1964) is a former professional tennis player from Sweden.

== Biography ==
Lindgren, a right-handed player born in Stockholm, played on the professional tour in the 1980s. He had a career best ranking of 119 in the world and made his only main draw appearance in a grand slam tournament at the 1988 Wimbledon Championships, losing in the first round to Karel Nováček. His best performance on the Grand Prix circuit was an appearance in the round of 16 at the 1988 U.S. Pro Indoor, which included a 6–1, 6–0 win over fourth seed Eduardo Bengoechea. He also beat top 50 players Ramesh Krishnan and Ulf Stenlund during his career.
