= 1989 Ebel U.S. Pro Indoor =

- Date: February 20–27
- Edition: 22nd
- Category: Grand Prix
- Draw: 48S / 24D
- Prize money: $410,000
- Surface: Carpet / indoor
- Location: Philadelphia, Pennsylvania, U.S.
- Venue: Spectrum

Champions

Singles
- (West Germany) Boris Becker

Doubles
- (United States) Paul Annacone / (South Africa) Christo van Rensburg
← 1988 ·	U.S. Pro Indoor	· 1990 →

The 1989 Ebel U.S. Pro Indoor was a men's tennis tournament played on indoor carpet courts at the Spectrum in Philadelphia, Pennsylvania in the United States that was part of the Super Series of the 1989 Nabisco Grand Prix. It was the 22nd edition of the tournament and was held from February 20 through February 27, 1989. Second-seeded Boris Becker won the singles title.

== Finals ==
=== Singles ===
(West Germany) Boris Becker defeated (United States) Tim Mayotte 7–6, 6–1, 6–3

- It was Becker's 2nd singles title of the year and the 21st of his career.

=== Doubles ===
(United States) Paul Annacone / (South Africa) Christo van Rensburg defeated (United States) Rick Leach / (United States) Jim Pugh 6–3, 7–5

- It was Annacone's 2nd title of the year and the 13th of his career. It was van Rensburg's 2nd title of the year and the 13th of his career.
