= 1988 Ebel U.S. Pro Indoor – Doubles =

Doubles
- 1988 Ebel U.S. Pro Indoor

Final
- Champions: (New Zealand) Kelly Evernden; (United States) Johan Kriek
- Runners-up: (United States) Kevin Curren; (South Africa) Danie Visser
- Score: 7–6, 6–3

Events
Singles	Doubles
← 1987 ·	Ebel U.S. Pro Indoor	· 1989 →

Sergio Casal and Emilio Sánchez were the defending champions but did not participate this year.

Kelly Evernden and Johan Kriek won the title, defeating Kevin Curren and Danie Visser 7–6, 6–3 in the final.

== Seeds ==
All seeds receive a bye into the second round.

1. (United States) Ken Flach / (United States) Jim Pugh (second round)
2. (United States) Paul Annacone / (Australia) John Fitzgerald (second round)
3. (United States) Scott Davis / (United States) Gary Donnelly (second round)
4. (United States) Sherwood Stewart / (United States) Blaine Willenborg (quarterfinals)
5. (United States) Andy Kohlberg / (United States) Robert Van't Hof (semifinals)
6. (United States) Marty Davis / (United States) Tim Pawsat (second round)
7. (New Zealand) Kelly Evernden / (United States) Johan Kriek (champions)
8. (Australia) Carl Limberger / (Australia) Mark Woodforde (quarterfinals)

== Draw ==
=== Key ===
- Q = Qualifier
- WC = Wild card
- LL = Lucky loser
- Alt = Alternate
- SE = Special exempt
- PR = Protected ranking
- ITF = ITF entry
- JE = Junior exempt
- w/o = Walkover
- r = Retired
- d = Defaulted
- SR = Special ranking

=== Finals ===
Semifinals

Final

7
- (New Zealand) Kelly Evernden
- (United States) Johan Kriek
7
6

5
- (United States) Andy Kohlberg
- (United States) Robert Van't Hof
6
4

7
- (New Zealand) Kelly Evernden
- (United States) Johan Kriek
7
6

- (United States) Kevin Curren
- (South Africa) Danie Visser
6
3

- (United States) Kevin Curren
- (South Africa) Danie Visser
6
3
6

- (Canada) Grant Connell
- (United States) Leif Shiras
4
6
3

=== Top half ===
First round

Second round

Quarterfinals

Semifinals

1
- (United States) K Flach
- (United States) J Pugh
3
6

- (United States) P Chamberlin
- (United States) L Scott
4
7
6

- (United States) P Chamberlin
- (United States) L Scott
6
7

- (Chile) R Acuña
- (Mexico) J Lozano
6
6
4

- (United States) P Chamberlin
- (United States) L Scott
4
1

- (United States) G Layendecker
- (United States) J Rive
7
1
6

7
- (New Zealand) K Evernden
- (United States) J Kriek
6
6

- (South Africa) P Aldrich
- (Australia) D Macpherson
6
6
3

- (United States) G Layendecker
- (United States) J Rive
4
2

7
- (New Zealand) K Evernden
- (United States) J Kriek
6
6

7
- (New Zealand) K Evernden
- (United States) J Kriek
7
6

5
- (United States) A Kohlberg
- (United States) R Van't Hof
6
4

3
- (United States) S Davis
- (United States) G Donnelly
2
2

- (Paraguay) F González
- (United States) E Teltscher
5
2

- (South Africa) E Edwards
- (South Africa) G Muller
6
6

- (South Africa) E Edwards
- (South Africa) G Muller
7
6

- (South Africa) E Edwards
- (South Africa) G Muller
6
6
4

WC
- (United States) D DiLucia
- (United States) J Stark
4
5

5
- (United States) A Kohlberg
- (United States) R Van't Hof
3
7
6

WC
- (United States) R Reneberg
- (United States) J Ross
6
7

WC
- (United States) R Reneberg
- (United States) J Ross
1
2

5
- (United States) A Kohlberg
- (United States) R Van't Hof
6
6

=== Bottom half ===
First round

Second round

Quarterfinals

Semifinals

6
- (United States) M Davis
- (United States) T Pawsat
6
4

- (Czechoslovakia) I Lendl
- (Czechoslovakia) T Šmíd
4
4

- (United States) K Curren
- (South Africa) D Visser
7
6

- (United States) K Curren
- (South Africa) D Visser
6
6

- (United States) K Curren
- (South Africa) D Visser
7
7

- (United States) D Goldie
- (United States) J Letts
6
1
7

4
- (United States) S Stewart
- (United States) B Willenborg
6
5

- (United States) E Korita
- (United States) B Pearce
3
6
5

- (United States) D Goldie
- (United States) J Letts
1
6

4
- (United States) S Stewart
- (United States) B Willenborg
6
7

- (United States) K Curren
- (South Africa) D Visser
6
3
6

- (Canada) G Connell
- (United States) L Shiras
4
6
3

8
- (Australia) C Limberger
- (Australia) M Woodforde
6
6

- (United States) M Dickson
- (United States) T Wilkison
1
4

- (Australia) B Dyke
- (Australia) W Masur
4
3

- (Australia) B Dyke
- (Australia) W Masur
6
6

8
- (Australia) C Limberger
- (Australia) M Woodforde
3
4

- (United States) M Flur
- (United States) T Siegel
2
2

- (Canada) G Connell
- (United States) L Shiras
6
6

- (Canada) G Connell
- (United States) L Shiras
6
6

- (Canada) G Connell
- (United States) L Shiras
7
6

2
- (United States) P Annacone
- (Australia) J Fitzgerald
6
3
