= 1987 Ebel U.S. Pro Indoor – Singles =

Singles
- 1987 Ebel U.S. Pro Indoor

Final
- Champion: (United States) Tim Mayotte
- Runner-up: (United States) John McEnroe
- Score: 3–6, 6–1, 6–3, 6–1

Details
- Draw: 48
- Seeds: 16

Events
Singles	Doubles
← 1986 ·	U.S. Pro Indoor	· 1988 →

Ivan Lendl was the defending champion but did not participate this year.

Tim Mayotte won the title, defeating John McEnroe, 3–6, 6–1, 6–3, 6–1 in the final.

== Seeds ==
1. (Sweden) Mats Wilander (second round)
2. (United States) Jimmy Connors (quarterfinals)
3. (United States) Brad Gilbert (second round)
4. (United States) John McEnroe (final)
5. (United States) Tim Mayotte (champion)
6. (Spain) Emilio Sánchez (third round)
7. (United States) Tim Wilkison (third round)
8. (West Germany) Eric Jelen (third round)
9. (Czechoslovakia) Milan Šrejber (semifinals)
10. (Czechoslovakia) Karel Nováček (quarterfinals)
11. (Switzerland) Jakob Hlasek (quarterfinals)
12. (India) Ramesh Krishnan (second round)
13. (Soviet Union) Andrei Chesnokov (second round)
14. (United States) Paul Annacone (quarterfinals)
15. (Socialist Federal Republic of Yugoslavia) Slobodan Živojinović (second round)
16. (Israel) Amos Mansdorf (semifinals)

== Draw ==
=== Key ===
- Q = Qualifier
- WC = Wild card
- LL = Lucky loser
- Alt = Alternate
- SE = Special exempt
- PR = Protected ranking
- ITF = ITF entry
- JE = Junior exempt
- w/o = Walkover
- r = Retired
- d = Defaulted
- SR = Special ranking

=== Finals ===
Semifinals
16	(Israel) Amos Mansdorf	7	2	3
4	(United States) John McEnroe	5	6	6
5	(United States) Tim Mayotte	6	6
9	(Czechoslovakia) Milan Šrejber	2	2

Final
4	(United States) John McEnroe	6	1	3	1
5	(United States) Tim Mayotte	3	6	6	6

=== Top half ===
==== Section 1 ====
First round
(Sweden) J Gunnarsson	7	5	6
Q	(United States) T Moor	6	7	3
Q	(United States) M Blackman	7	6
(Brazil) L Mattar	6	2
(South Africa) E Edwards	6	6	6
(United States) G Donnelly	4	7	2
Q	(South Africa) B Moir	6	3	4
(United States) M Dickson	2	6	6

Second round
1	(Sweden) M Wilander	5	6
(Sweden) J Gunnarsson	7	7
Q	(United States) M Blackman	4	2
16	(Israel) A Mansdorf	6	6
10	(Czechoslovakia) K Nováček	6	6
(South Africa) E Edwards	1	2
(United States) M Dickson	6	2	6
8	(West Germany) E Jelen	1	6	7

Third round
(Sweden) J Gunnarsson	5	1
16	(Israel) A Mansdorf	7	6
10	(Czechoslovakia) K Nováček	2	7	6
8	(West Germany) E Jelen	6	6	4

Quarterfinals
16	(Israel) A Mansdorf	6	6	6
10	(Czechoslovakia) K Nováček	7	3	4

==== Section 2 ====
First round
(South Africa) C Steyn	3	1
(United States) M Purcell	6	6
(United States) G Layendecker	3	4
(Czechoslovakia) T Šmíd	6	6
(United States) A Agassi	2	2
(South Africa) D Visser	6	6
Q	(Soviet Union) A Volkov	5	3
(United States) D Rostagno	7	6

Second round
4	(United States) J McEnroe	6	6
(United States) M Purcell	2	1
(Czechoslovakia) T Šmíd	7	4	6
13	(Soviet Union) A Chesnokov	6	6	4
11	(Switzerland) J Hlasek	6	2	6
(South Africa) D Visser	2	6	2
(United States) D Rostagno	7	3	4
6	(Spain) E Sánchez	6	6	6

Third round
4	(United States) J McEnroe	6	6
(Czechoslovakia) T Šmíd	2	1
11	(Switzerland) J Hlasek	6	7	6
6	(Spain) E Sánchez	7	5	4

Quarterfinals
4	(United States) J McEnroe	6	6
11	(Switzerland) J Hlasek	2	3

=== Bottom half ===
==== Section 3 ====
First round
(United States) M Freeman	6	6	6
Q	(South Africa) G Muller	7	1	7
(Netherlands) M Schapers	6	2	6
(United States) B Testerman	3	6	7
(Mexico) L Lavalle	7	6
(United States) M Davis	5	3
(Australia) B Dyke	6	7
(United States) B Pearce	2	6

Second round
5	(United States) T Mayotte	6	7
Q	(South Africa) G Muller	2	6
(United States) B Testerman	6	5	6
12	(India) R Krishnan	0	7	4
14	(United States) P Annacone	6	6
(Mexico) L Lavalle	4	2
(Australia) B Dyke	7	6	6
3	(United States) B Gilbert	6	7	4

Third round
5	(United States) T Mayotte	6	6
(United States) B Testerman	2	2
14	(United States) P Annacone	6	6	6
(Australia) B Dyke	1	7	3

Quarterfinals
5	(United States) T Mayotte	7	6
14	(United States) P Annacone	5	4

==== Section 4 ====
First round
(South Africa) C van Rensburg	6	6
(Brazil) C Motta	2	3
Q	(United States) M Flur	3	1
(United States) S Giammalva Jr.	6	6
(United States) S Davis	3	6	6
(United States) G Holmes	6	1	4
(Spain) S Casal	6	6
(United States) M Anger	3	4

Second round
7	(United States) T Wilkison	4	7	6
(South Africa) C van Rensburg	6	6	3
(United States) S Giammalva Jr.	6	6
9	(Czechoslovakia) M Šrejber	7	7
15	(Socialist Federal Republic of Yugoslavia) S Živojinović	3	4
(United States) S Davis	6	6
(Spain) S Casal	2	6
2	(United States) J Connors	6	7

Third round
7	(United States) T Wilkison	6	4	2
9	(Czechoslovakia) M Šrejber	2	6	6
(United States) S Davis	3	6	5
2	(United States) J Connors	6	4	7

Quarterfinals
9	(Czechoslovakia) M Šrejber	6	7
2	(United States) J Connors	3	6
