= 1987 Ebel U.S. Pro Indoor – Doubles =

Doubles
- 1987 Ebel U.S. Pro Indoor

Final
- Champions: (Spain) Sergio Casal; (Spain) Emilio Sánchez
- Runners-up: (South Africa) Christo Steyn; (South Africa) Danie Visser
- Score: 3–6, 6–1, 7–6

Events
| Singles | Doubles |
| ← 1986 · | Ebel U.S. Pro Indoor | · 1988 → |

Scott Davis and David Pate were the defending champions, but Pate did not participate this year. Davis partnered Brad Gilbert, losing in the quarterfinals.

Sergio Casal and Emilio Sánchez won the title, defeating Christo Steyn and Danie Visser 3–6, 6–1, 7–6 in the final.

== Seeds ==
All seeds receive a bye into the second round.

1. (United States) Ken Flach / (Czechoslovakia) Tomáš Šmíd (semifinals)
2. (United States) Paul Annacone / (South Africa) Christo van Rensburg (quarterfinals)
3. (United States) Chip Hooper / (United States) Mike Leach (second round)
4. (United States) Gary Donnelly / (Australia) Kim Warwick (quarterfinals)
5. (Spain) Sergio Casal / (Spain) Emilio Sánchez (champions)
6. (South Africa) Christo Steyn / (South Africa) Danie Visser (final)
7. (United States) Scott Davis / (United States) Brad Gilbert (quarterfinals)
8. (Sweden) Jan Gunnarsson / (Sweden) Mats Wilander (second round)

== Draw ==
=== Key ===
- Q = Qualifier
- WC = Wild card
- LL = Lucky loser
- Alt = Alternate
- SE = Special exempt
- PR = Protected ranking
- ITF = ITF entry
- JE = Junior exempt
- w/o = Walkover
- r = Retired
- d = Defaulted
- SR = Special ranking

=== Finals ===
Semifinals

Final

1
- (United States) Ken Flach
- (Czechoslovakia) Tomáš Šmíd
2
7
3

5
- (Spain) Sergio Casal
- (Spain) Emilio Sánchez
6
6
6

5
- (Spain) Sergio Casal
- (Spain) Emilio Sánchez
3
6
7

6
- (South Africa) Christo Steyn
- (South Africa) Danie Visser
6
1
6

6
- (South Africa) Christo Steyn
- (South Africa) Danie Visser
6
7

- (United States) Mark Dickson
- (United States) Robert Van't Hof
2
6

=== Top half ===
First round

Second round

Quarterfinals

Semifinals

1
- (United States) K Flach
- (Czechoslovakia) T Šmíd
6
7

WC
- (United States) A Agassi
- (United States) T Mayotte
6
6

WC
- (United States) A Agassi
- (United States) T Mayotte
3
6

- (Iran) M Bahrami
- (Israel) S Glickstein
2
3

1
- (United States) K Flach
- (Czechoslovakia) T Šmíd
6
6

- (South Africa) E Edwards
- (Paraguay) F González
6
7
3

7
- (United States) S Davis
- (United States) B Gilbert
3
4

- (Switzerland) J Hlasek
- (Mexico) L Lavalle
7
5
6

- (Switzerland) J Hlasek
- (Mexico) L Lavalle
4
6

7
- (United States) S Davis
- (United States) B Gilbert
6
7

1
- (United States) K Flach
- (Czechoslovakia) T Šmíd
2
7
3

5
- (Spain) S Casal
- (Spain) E Sánchez
6
6
6

4
- (United States) G Donnelly
- (Australia) K Warwick
6
7

- (United States) M Anger
- (United States) G Holmes
7
7

- (United States) M Anger
- (United States) G Holmes
4
6

- (Netherlands) M Schapers
- (Czechoslovakia) M Šrejber
5
6

4
- (United States) G Donnelly
- (Australia) K Warwick
3
6
3

- (United States) B Testerman
- (United States) T Wilkison
6
6

5
- (Spain) S Casal
- (Spain) E Sánchez
6
3
6

- (Poland) W Fibak
- (West Germany) E Jelen
4
2

- (United States) B Testerman
- (United States) T Wilkison
6
6
4

5
- (Spain) S Casal
- (Spain) E Sánchez
0
7
6

=== Bottom half ===
First round

Second round

Quarterfinals

Semifinals

6
- (South Africa) C Steyn
- (South Africa) D Visser
6
7

- (Brazil) L Mattar
- (Brazil) C Motta
6
5
6

- (Brazil) L Mattar
- (Brazil) C Motta
3
5

- (United States) M Flur
- (United States) T Moor
2
7
4

6
- (South Africa) C Steyn
- (South Africa) D Visser
7
6

- (United States) M Freeman
- (United States) B Pearce
6
6

- (United States) M Freeman
- (United States) B Pearce
5
3

- (South Africa) G Muller
- (South Africa) M Robertson
4
4

- (United States) M Freeman
- (United States) B Pearce
6
6

3
- (United States) C Hooper
- (United States) M Leach
3
4

6
- (South Africa) C Steyn
- (South Africa) D Visser
6
7

- (United States) M Dickson
- (United States) R Van't Hof
2
6

8
- (Sweden) J Gunnarsson
- (Sweden) M Wilander
1
4

- (United States) G Layendecker
- (United States) L Scott
3
6

- (United States) M Dickson
- (United States) R Van't Hof
6
6

- (United States) M Dickson
- (United States) R Van't Hof
6
7

- (United States) M Dickson
- (United States) R Van't Hof
4
7
6

- (United States) D Cassidy
- (United States) M Purcell
6
6

2
- (United States) P Annacone
- (South Africa) C van Rensburg
6
6
2

- (Australia) B Dyke
- (United States) B Green
3
4

- (United States) D Cassidy
- (United States) M Purcell
5
6

2
- (United States) P Annacone
- (South Africa) C van Rensburg
7
7
