= 1986 Ebel U.S. Pro Indoor =

- Date: January 27 – February 3
- Edition: 19th
- Category: Grand Prix circuit
- Draw: 48S / 28D
- Prize money: $375,000
- Surface: Carpet / indoor
- Location: Philadelphia, PA, United States
- Venue: Spectrum

Champions

Singles
- (Czechoslovakia) Ivan Lendl

Doubles
- (United States) Scott Davis / (United States) David Pate
- U.S. Pro Indoor

The 1986 Ebel U.S. Pro Indoor was a men's tennis tournament played on indoor carpet courts that was part of the 1986 Nabisco Grand Prix. It was the 19th edition of the tournament and was played at the Spectrum in Philadelphia in the United States from January 27 to February 3, 1986. First-seeded Ivan Lendl won the singles title.

== Finals ==
=== Singles ===
(Czechoslovakia) Ivan Lendl defeated (United States) Tim Mayotte by walkover

- It was Lendl's 1st title of the year and the 58th of his career.

=== Doubles ===
(United States) Scott Davis / (United States) David Pate defeated (Sweden) Stefan Edberg / (Sweden) Anders Järryd 7–6, 3–6, 6–3, 7–5

- It was Davis' only title of the year and the 8th of his career. It was Pate's only title of the year and the 4th of his career.
