= 1988 Ebel U.S. Pro Indoor =

- Date: February 22–29
- Edition: 21st
- Category: Grand Prix
- Draw: 48S / 24D
- Prize money: $410,000
- Surface: Carpet / indoor
- Location: Philadelphia, PA, United States
- Venue: Spectrum

Champions

Singles
- (United States) Tim Mayotte

Doubles
- (New Zealand) Kelly Evernden / (United States) Johan Kriek
← 1987 ·	U.S. Pro Indoor	· 1989 →

The 1988 Ebel U.S. Pro Indoor was a men's tennis tournament played on indoor carpet courts that was part of the 1988 Nabisco Grand Prix. It was the 21st edition of the tournament and was played at the Spectrum in Philadelphia, Pennsylvania in the United States from February 22 to February 29, 1988. Second-seeded Tim Mayotte won his second consecutive singles title at the event.

== Finals ==
=== Singles ===
(United States) Tim Mayotte defeated (Australia) John Fitzgerald 4–6, 6–2, 6–2, 6–3

- It was Mayotte's 1st title of the year and the 9th of his career.

=== Doubles ===
(New Zealand) Kelly Evernden / (United States) Johan Kriek defeated (United States) Kevin Curren / (South Africa) Danie Visser 7–6, 6–3

- It was Evernden's only title of the year and the 5th of his career. It was Kriek's 1st title of the year and the 21st of his career.
