= 2019 French Open – Men's singles qualifying =

Men's singles qualifying
- 2019 French Open

Events
| Singles | men | women | | boys | girls |
| Doubles | men | women | mixed | boys | girls |
| WC Singles | men | women | quad |
| WC Doubles | men | women | quad |
| Legends | −45 | 45+ | women |

Qualification
| Singles | men | women |
- French Open

The 2019 French Open – Men's Singles Qualifying was a series of tennis matches which took place from 20–24 May 2019 to determine the sixteen qualifiers into the main draw of the 2019 French Open – Men's singles. Five players also qualified as lucky losers.

== Seeds ==
1. (United States) Tennys Sandgren (qualified)
2. (Uzbekistan) Denis Istomin (first round)
3. (Italy) Paolo Lorenzi (first round)
4. (Switzerland) Henri Laaksonen (qualifying competition, lucky loser)
5. (Poland) Kamil Majchrzak (first round)
6. (Ukraine) Sergiy Stakhovsky (qualifying competition, lucky loser)
7. (Brazil) Thiago Monteiro (qualified)
8. (Germany) Yannick Maden (qualified)
9. (United States) Ryan Harrison (first round)
10. (Sweden) Elias Ymer (first round)
11. (Austria) Dennis Novak (first round)
12. (Spain) Guillermo García López (qualified)
13. (Italy) Stefano Travaglia (qualified)
14. (Canada) Peter Polansky (second round)
15. (Austria) Sebastian Ofner (second round)
16. (Germany) Matthias Bachinger (second round)
17. (Spain) Alejandro Davidovich Fokina (qualifying competition, lucky loser)
18. (Australia) Alex Bolt (first round)
19. (Czech Republic) Lukáš Rosol (qualifying competition, lucky loser)
20. (United States) Bjorn Fratangelo (second round)
21. (Serbia) Nikola Milojević (second round)
22. (United States) Michael Mmoh (first round)
23. (Germany) Oscar Otte (qualifying competition, lucky loser)
24. (Italy) Gianluca Mager (second round, retired)
25. (Argentina) Marco Trungelliti (first round)
26. (Spain) Pedro Martínez (qualified)
27. (Argentina) Facundo Bagnis (first round)
28. (India) Ramkumar Ramanathan (first round)
29. (Slovakia) Lukáš Lacko (first round)
30. (South Korea) Kwon Soon-woo (first round)
31. (Italy) Salvatore Caruso (qualified)
32. (Sweden) Mikael Ymer (qualified)

== Qualifiers ==
1. (United States) Tennys Sandgren
2. (Italy) Salvatore Caruso
3. (France) Elliot Benchetrit
4. (Sweden) Mikael Ymer
5. (Italy) Simone Bolelli
6. (Russia) Alexey Vatutin
7. (Brazil) Thiago Monteiro
8. (Germany) Yannick Maden
9. (Spain) Pedro Martínez
10. (Belgium) Kimmer Coppejans
11. (Slovenia) Blaž Rola
12. (Spain) Guillermo García López
13. (Italy) Stefano Travaglia
14. (France) Alexandre Müller
15. (Germany) Yannick Hanfmann
16. (Germany) Rudolf Molleker

== Lucky losers ==
1. (Ukraine) Sergiy Stakhovsky
2. (Czech Republic) Lukáš Rosol
3. (Germany) Oscar Otte
4. (Switzerland) Henri Laaksonen
5. (Spain) Alejandro Davidovich Fokina

== Draw ==
=== First qualifier ===
First round
1 | (United States) Tennys Sandgren | 6 | 6
(Japan) Yosuke Watanuki | 2 | 4
(Germany) Mats Moraing | 6 | 5 | 6
(Slovakia) Andrej Martin | 3 | 7 | 4
(France) Mathias Bourgue | 4 | 6 | 6
(Italy) Matteo Viola | 6 | 1 | 3
(Belarus) Egor Gerasimov | 5 | 3
21 | (Serbia) Nikola Milojević | 7 | 6

Second round
1 | (United States) Tennys Sandgren | 6 | 6
(Germany) Mats Moraing | 2 | 2
(France) Mathias Bourgue | 2 | 6 | 7
21 | (Serbia) Nikola Milojević | 6 | 4 | 5

Qualifying competition
1 | (United States) Tennys Sandgren | 7^{7} | 7
(France) Mathias Bourgue | 6^{1} | 5

=== Second qualifier ===
First round
2 | (Uzbekistan) Denis Istomin | 6^{5} | 1
(Germany) Dustin Brown | 7^{7} | 6
(Spain) Daniel Gimeno Traver | 4 | 1
(Ecuador) Emilio Gómez | 6 | 6
(China) Zhang Ze | 7^{7} | 6
(Slovakia) Filip Horanský | 6^{3} | 2
(Slovakia) Norbert Gombos | 7 | 4 | 4
31 | (Italy) Salvatore Caruso | 5 | 6 | 6

Second round
(Germany) Dustin Brown | 6 | 7
(Ecuador) Emilio Gómez | 2 | 5
(China) Zhang Ze | 2 | 2
31 | (Italy) Salvatore Caruso | 6 | 6

Qualifying competition
(Germany) Dustin Brown | 6 | 4 | 3
31 | (Italy) Salvatore Caruso | 4 | 6 | 6

=== Third qualifier ===
First round
3 | (Italy) Paolo Lorenzi | 6 | 4 | 0
(France) Enzo Couacaud | 4 | 6 | 6
(Belgium) Arthur De Greef | 5 | 6 | 6
PR | (Ukraine) Illya Marchenko | 7 | 3 | 2
(Argentina) Pedro Cachin | 3 | 6 | 3
WC | (France) Elliot Benchetrit | 6 | 1 | 6
(Russia) Evgeny Donskoy | 6 | 4 | 6^{3}
20 | (United States) Bjorn Fratangelo | 3 | 6 | 7^{7}

Second round
(France) Enzo Couacaud | 6 | 6
(Belgium) Arthur De Greef | 0 | 3
WC | (France) Elliot Benchetrit | 6 | 6
20 | (United States) Bjorn Fratangelo | 3 | 4

Qualifying competition
(France) Enzo Couacaud | 6 | 6^{4} | 2
WC | (France) Elliot Benchetrit | 4 | 7^{7} | 6

=== Fourth qualifier ===
First round
4 | (Switzerland) Henri Laaksonen | 6 | 6
(Germany) Daniel Brands | 3 | 0
(Argentina) Facundo Argüello | 3 | 6 | 6
(Italy) Filippo Baldi | 6 | 3 | 2
(Japan) Tatsuma Ito | 2 | 6^{3}
WC | (France) Johan Tatlot | 6 | 7^{7}
(Italy) Roberto Marcora | 4 | 6 | 1
32 | (Sweden) Mikael Ymer | 6 | 2 | 6

Second round
4 | (Switzerland) Henri Laaksonen | 4 | 6 | 6
(Argentina) Facundo Argüello | 6 | 4 | 3
WC | (France) Johan Tatlot | 6 | 6^{2} | 1
32 | (Sweden) Mikael Ymer | 3 | 7^{7} | 6

Qualifying competition
4 | (Switzerland) Henri Laaksonen | 1 | 6 | 2
32 | (Sweden) Mikael Ymer | 6 | 2 | 6

=== Fifth qualifier ===
First round
5 | (Poland) Kamil Majchrzak | 5 | 6^{5}
(Italy) Simone Bolelli | 7 | 7^{7}
(Germany) Dominik Köpfer | 7 | 6
(United States) Mitchell Krueger | 5 | 1
(Netherlands) Thiemo de Bakker | 6 | 7
(Japan) Yasutaka Uchiyama | 3 | 5
(Japan) Go Soeda | 6 | 6
27 | (Argentina) Facundo Bagnis | 1 | 2

Second round
(Italy) Simone Bolelli | 6 | 3 | 6
(Germany) Dominik Köpfer | 1 | 6 | 3
(Netherlands) Thiemo de Bakker | 1 | 6 | 3
(Japan) Go Soeda | 6 | 3 | 6

Qualifying competition
(Italy) Simone Bolelli | 6 | 7^{7}
(Japan) Go Soeda | 1 | 6^{5}

=== Sixth qualifier ===
First round
6 | (Ukraine) Sergiy Stakhovsky | 4
(Australia) James Duckworth | 2^{r}
(Belarus) Uladzimir Ignatik | 6 | 4 | 4
(Italy) Matteo Donati | 3 | 6 | 1^{r}
(Russia) Alexey Vatutin | 2 | 6 | 7
PR | (Austria) Gerald Melzer | 6 | 1 | 5
WC | (France) Hugo Gaston | 6 | 6
25 | (Argentina) Marco Trungelliti | 4 | 1

Second round
6 | (Ukraine) Sergiy Stakhovsky | 7^{7} | 6
(Belarus) Uladzimir Ignatik | 6^{2} | 4
(Russia) Alexey Vatutin | 6 | 6
WC | (France) Hugo Gaston | 1 | 3

Qualifying competition
6 | (Ukraine) Sergiy Stakhovsky | 4 | 6 | 3
(Russia) Alexey Vatutin | 6 | 1 | 6

=== Seventh qualifier ===
First round
7 | (Brazil) Thiago Monteiro | 7^{7} | 6
(Egypt) Mohamed Safwat | 6^{3} | 0
WC | (France) Antoine Cornut-Chauvinc | 3 | 6 | 7^{7}
(Czech Republic) Zdeněk Kolář | 6 | 2 | 6^{5}
(Austria) Lucas Miedler | 7 | 6
(Russia) Evgeny Karlovskiy | 5 | 2
(Hungary) Attila Balázs | 7 | 6
30 | (South Korea) Kwon Soon-woo | 5 | 3

Second round
7 | (Brazil) Thiago Monteiro | 6 | 4 | 6
WC | (France) Antoine Cornut-Chauvinc | 3 | 6 | 3
(Austria) Lucas Miedler | 7^{7} | 6
(Hungary) Attila Balázs | 6^{5} | 3

Qualifying competition
7 | (Brazil) Thiago Monteiro | 6 | 6
(Austria) Lucas Miedler | 2 | 4

=== Eighth qualifier ===
First round
8 | (Germany) Yannick Maden | 6 | 6
(Estonia) Jürgen Zopp | 3 | 2
(Denmark) Mikael Torpegaard | 6 | 6
(United States) Noah Rubin | 2 | 2
(Croatia) Viktor Galović | 3 | 4
(Portugal) João Domingues | 6 | 6
(United Kingdom) Jay Clarke | 6 | 6^{5} | 1
17 | (Spain) Alejandro Davidovich Fokina | 2 | 7^{7} | 6

Second round
8 | (Germany) Yannick Maden | 6 | 4 | 6
(Denmark) Mikael Torpegaard | 4 | 6 | 2
(Portugal) João Domingues | 2 | 5
17 | (Spain) Alejandro Davidovich Fokina | 6 | 7

Qualifying competition
8 | (Germany) Yannick Maden | 6 | 3 | 6
17 | (Spain) Alejandro Davidovich Fokina | 3 | 6 | 1

=== Ninth qualifier ===
First round
9 | (United States) Ryan Harrison | 3 | 7^{7} | 6^{5}
(Czech Republic) Adam Pavlásek | 6 | 6^{5} | 7^{7}
WC | (France) Geoffrey Blancaneaux | 7^{7} | 3 | 6
(Italy) Andrea Arnaboldi | 6^{5} | 6 | 3
(Japan) Kaichi Uchida | 6^{6} | 3
(Bosnia and Herzegovina) Mirza Bašić | 7^{8} | 6
(United States) Christopher Eubanks | 4 | 4
26 | (Spain) Pedro Martínez | 6 | 6

Second round
(Czech Republic) Adam Pavlásek | 4 | 6 | 5
WC | (France) Geoffrey Blancaneaux | 6 | 1 | 7
(Bosnia and Herzegovina) Mirza Bašić | 2 | 5
26 | (Spain) Pedro Martínez | 6 | 7

Qualifying competition
WC | (France) Geoffrey Blancaneaux | 3 | 1
26 | (Spain) Pedro Martínez | 6 | 6

=== Tenth qualifier ===
First round
10 | (Sweden) Elias Ymer | 4 | 6 | 4
WC | (France) Matteo Martineau | 6 | 3 | 6
(Belgium) Kimmer Coppejans | 6 | 6^{6} | 6
(Brazil) Rogério Dutra Silva | 3 | 7^{8} | 4
(Italy) Gianluigi Quinzi | 6 | 1 | 6
(Australia) Marc Polmans | 2 | 6 | 3
WC | (France) Manuel Guinard | 7^{7} | 4 | 6
29 | (Slovakia) Lukáš Lacko | 6^{4} | 6 | 1

Second round
WC | (France) Matteo Martineau | 0 | 6 | 2
(Belgium) Kimmer Coppejans | 6 | 1 | 6
(Italy) Gianluigi Quinzi | 3 | 6^{4}
WC | (France) Manuel Guinard | 6 | 7^{7}

Qualifying competition
(Belgium) Kimmer Coppejans | 6 | 4 | 6
WC | (France) Manuel Guinard | 3 | 6 | 1

=== Eleventh qualifier ===
First round
11 | (Austria) Dennis Novak | 2 | 3
(Slovenia) Blaž Rola | 6 | 6
(Netherlands) Tallon Griekspoor | 6 | 6^{5} | 4
(Ecuador) Roberto Quiroz | 2 | 7^{7} | 6
(Colombia) Daniel Elahi Galán | 4 | 6 | 6
(Argentina) Carlos Berlocq | 6 | 3 | 4
(Spain) Adrián Menéndez Maceiras | 6 | 6
18 | (Australia) Alex Bolt | 2 | 2

Second round
(Slovenia) Blaž Rola | 6 | 6
(Ecuador) Roberto Quiroz | 2 | 3
(Colombia) Daniel Elahi Galán | 7 | 6^{4} | 7^{7}
(Spain) Adrián Menéndez Maceiras | 5 | 7^{7} | 6^{0}

Qualifying competition
(Slovenia) Blaž Rola | 6 | 6
(Colombia) Daniel Elahi Galán | 3 | 2

=== Twelfth qualifier ===
First round
12 | (Spain) Guillermo García López | 6 | 6
(United States) Tim Smyczek | 1 | 4
(Serbia) Peđa Krstin | 6 | 6
(Italy) Lorenzo Giustino | 4 | 2
(Italy) Federico Gaio | 6^{3} | 4
(Italy) Stefano Napolitano | 7^{7} | 6
(United Kingdom) James Ward | 1 | 2
23 | (Germany) Oscar Otte | 6 | 6

Second round
12 | (Spain) Guillermo García López | 4 | 6 | 6
(Serbia) Peđa Krstin | 6 | 3 | 4
(Italy) Stefano Napolitano | 4 | 1
23 | (Germany) Oscar Otte | 6 | 6

Qualifying competition
12 | (Spain) Guillermo García López | 3 | 6 | 6
23 | (Germany) Oscar Otte | 6 | 4 | 0

=== Thirteenth qualifier ===
First round
13 | (Italy) Stefano Travaglia | 1 | 6 | 7^{7}
(Austria) Jurij Rodionov | 6 | 3 | 6^{4}
(Croatia) Nino Serdarušić | 6 | 6
(China) Li Zhe | 2 | 2
(Japan) Hiroki Moriya | 6^{4} | 5
PR | (Belgium) Steve Darcis | 7^{7} | 7
WC | (France) Corentin Denolly | 6 | 6
22 | (United States) Michael Mmoh | 1 | 4

Second round
13 | (Italy) Stefano Travaglia | 6 | 6
(Croatia) Nino Serdarušić | 4 | 4
PR | (Belgium) Steve Darcis | 3 | 6 | 6
WC | (France) Corentin Denolly | 6 | 1 | 4

Qualifying competition
13 | (Italy) Stefano Travaglia | 7^{7} | 6
PR | (Belgium) Steve Darcis | 6^{3} | 3

=== Fourteenth qualifier ===
First round
14 | (Canada) Peter Polansky | 6 | 6
(Barbados) Darian King | 4 | 4
WC | (France) Alexandre Müller | 5 | 7^{9} | 6
(Italy) Alessandro Giannessi | 7 | 6^{7} | 1
(Germany) Kevin Krawietz | 4 | 3
(Serbia) Viktor Troicki | 6 | 6
(Australia) Jason Kubler | 6 | 6
28 | (India) Ramkumar Ramanathan | 4 | 4

Second round
14 | (Canada) Peter Polansky | 2 | 6 | 6^{2}
WC | (France) Alexandre Müller | 6 | 4 | 7^{7}
(Serbia) Viktor Troicki | 6 | 7^{11}
(Australia) Jason Kubler | 1 | 6^{9}

Qualifying competition
WC | (France) Alexandre Müller | 6 | 6
(Serbia) Viktor Troicki | 3 | 4

=== Fifteenth qualifier ===
First round
15 | (Austria) Sebastian Ofner | 6 | 7^{7}
(Belgium) Ruben Bemelmans | 2 | 6^{5}
(Germany) Yannick Hanfmann | 6 | 7
(France) Constant Lestienne | 2 | 5
(United States) Marcos Giron | 6 | 6
(United States) Donald Young | 0 | 1
PR/Alt | (Israel) Amir Weintraub | 3 | 1
19 | (Czech Republic) Lukáš Rosol | 6 | 6

Second round
15 | (Austria) Sebastian Ofner | 2 | 1
(Germany) Yannick Hanfmann | 6 | 6
(United States) Marcos Giron | 4 | 4
19 | (Czech Republic) Lukáš Rosol | 6 | 6

Qualifying competition
(Germany) Yannick Hanfmann | 6 | 6
19 | (Czech Republic) Lukáš Rosol | 2 | 2

=== Sixteenth qualifier ===
First round
16 | (Germany) Matthias Bachinger | 7 | 2 | 6
(Spain) Sergio Gutiérrez Ferrol | 5 | 6 | 3
(Germany) Rudolf Molleker | 7^{7} | 6
(Spain) Tommy Robredo | 6^{5} | 3
(Kazakhstan) Aleksandr Nedovyesov | 6 | 4 | 3
(Colombia) Santiago Giraldo | 3 | 6 | 6
(Spain) Enrique López Pérez | 6^{0} | 0
24 | (Italy) Gianluca Mager | 7^{7} | 6

Second round
16 | (Germany) Matthias Bachinger | 6 | 3 | 4
(Germany) Rudolf Molleker | 4 | 6 | 6
(Colombia) Santiago Giraldo | 4 | 7^{7} | 3
24 | (Italy) Gianluca Mager | 6 | 6^{4} | 0^{r}

Qualifying competition
(Germany) Rudolf Molleker | 4 | 6 | 6
(Colombia) Santiago Giraldo | 6 | 4 | 4
