= 2019 French Open – Women's singles qualifying =

Women's singles qualifying
- 2019 French Open

Events
Singles	men	women		boys	girls
Doubles	men	women	mixed	boys	girls
WC Singles	men	women	quad
WC Doubles	men	women	quad
Legends	−45	45+	women

Qualification
Singles	men	women
- French Open

The 2019 French Open – Women's singles qualifying was a series of tennis matches that took place from 21 May 2018 to 24 May 2019 to determine the twelve qualifiers into the main draw of the 2019 French Open – Women's singles, and, if necessary, the lucky losers.

== Seeds ==
1. (United States) Bernarda Pera (qualified)
2. (Switzerland) Jil Teichmann (first round)
3. (Switzerland) Timea Bacsinszky (second round)
4. (Switzerland) Stefanie Vögele (first round)
5. (United Kingdom) Heather Watson (second round)
6. (United States) Christina McHale (first round)
7. (Belgium) Ysaline Bonaventure (first round)
8. (Russia) Natalia Vikhlyantseva (second round)
9. (Russia) Anna Blinkova (qualified)
10. (Czech Republic) Marie Bouzková (qualifying competition, lucky loser)
11. (United States) Whitney Osuigwe (second round)
12. (Japan) Nao Hibino (qualifying competition)
13. (Serbia) Olga Danilović (second round)
14. (Czech Republic) Tereza Smitková (first round)
15. (Romania) Ana Bogdan (second round)
16. (Brazil) Beatriz Haddad Maia (first round, retired)
17. (Czech Republic) Barbora Krejčíková (first round, retired)
18. (Spain) Paula Badosa Gibert (first round)
19. (United States) Varvara Lepchenko (qualified)
20. (Netherlands) Arantxa Rus (first round)
21. (Slovenia) Kaja Juvan (qualifying competition, lucky loser)
22. (Kazakhstan) Elena Rybakina (qualified)
23. (United States) Sachia Vickery (second round)
24. (China) Peng Shuai (first round)

== Qualifiers ==
1. (United States) Bernarda Pera
2. (Slovakia) Kristína Kučová
3. (Japan) Kurumi Nara
4. (Spain) Aliona Bolsova
5. (United States) Varvara Lepchenko
6. (Italy) Giulia Gatto-Monticone
7. (Germany) Antonia Lottner
8. (Russia) Sofya Zhuk
9. (Russia) Anna Blinkova
10. (Russia) Liudmila Samsonova
11. (Italy) Jasmine Paolini
12. (Kazakhstan) Elena Rybakina

== Lucky losers ==
1. (Czech Republic) Marie Bouzková
2. (Hungary) Tímea Babos
3. (Slovenia) Kaja Juvan

== Draw ==
=== First qualifier ===
First round
1	(United States) Bernarda Pera	6	6
WC	(France) Alizé Lim	1	3
(China) Zhang Kailin	6	6
(Croatia) Tereza Mrdeža	4	2
(India) Ankita Raina	4	4
WC	(United States) Cori Gauff	6	6
PR	(Sweden) Susanne Celik	1	0
21	(Slovenia) Kaja Juvan	6	6

Second round
1	(United States) Bernarda Pera	6	6
(China) Zhang Kailin	4	4
WC	(United States) Cori Gauff	3	3
21	(Slovenia) Kaja Juvan	6	6

Qualifying competition
1	(United States) Bernarda Pera	6	1	7^{7}
21	(Slovenia) Kaja Juvan	4	6	6^{1}

=== Second qualifier ===
First round
2	(Switzerland) Jil Teichmann	4	2
(United Kingdom) Katie Swan	6	6
(China) Wang Xiyu	6	6
(United States) Danielle Lao	1	1
PR	(Czech Republic) Denisa Allertová	5	0
(Slovakia) Kristína Kučová	7	6
(Germany) Tamara Korpatsch	4	7^{7}	7^{7}
18	(Spain) Paula Badosa Gibert	6	6^{2}	6^{5}

Second round
(United Kingdom) Katie Swan	6	0	7
(China) Wang Xiyu	4	6	5
(Slovakia) Kristína Kučová	6	6
(Germany) Tamara Korpatsch	4	3

Qualifying competition
(United Kingdom) Katie Swan	4	5
(Slovakia) Kristína Kučová	6	7

=== Third qualifier ===
First round
3	(Switzerland) Timea Bacsinszky	6	6
(Hungary) Fanny Stollár	3	4
(Poland) Katarzyna Kawa	2	6	5
(Japan) Kurumi Nara	6	1	7
(Switzerland) Conny Perrin	7	6
(Australia) Arina Rodionova	5	1
(Paraguay) Verónica Cepede Royg	5	4
15	(Romania) Ana Bogdan	7	6

Second round
3	(Switzerland) Timea Bacsinszky	2	6	4
(Japan) Kurumi Nara	6	4	6
(Switzerland) Conny Perrin	7	7
15	(Romania) Ana Bogdan	5	5

Qualifying competition
(Japan) Kurumi Nara	7^{7}	7
(Switzerland) Conny Perrin	6^{2}	5

=== Fourth qualifier ===
First round
4	(Switzerland) Stefanie Vögele	4	6	3
(China) Xu Shilin	6	2	6
(United States) Kristie Ahn	1	4
(Spain) Aliona Bolsova	6	6
(Montenegro) Danka Kovinić	2	2
(Hungary) Tímea Babos	6	6
(Italy) Martina Trevisan	4	6	6
14	(Czech Republic) Tereza Smitková	6	3	2

Second round
(China) Xu Shilin	1	2
(Spain) Aliona Bolsova	6	6
(Hungary) Tímea Babos	6	2	7
(Italy) Martina Trevisan	4	6	5

Qualifying competition
(Spain) Aliona Bolsova	6	2	6
(Hungary) Tímea Babos	2	6	3

=== Fifth qualifier ===
First round
5	(United Kingdom) Heather Watson	6	4	6
(Netherlands) Bibiane Schoofs	2	6	4
(Greece) Valentini Grammatikopoulou	6	3	6
(Australia) Kimberly Birrell	2	6	4
(Switzerland) Ylena In-Albon	3	1
PR	(Switzerland) Romina Oprandi	6	6
(Russia) Anna Kalinskaya	6^{5}	4
19	(United States) Varvara Lepchenko	7^{7}	6

Second round
5	(United Kingdom) Heather Watson	5	7^{8}	6^{3}
(Greece) Valentini Grammatikopoulou	7	6^{6}	7^{7}
PR	(Switzerland) Romina Oprandi	1	1
19	(United States) Varvara Lepchenko	6	6

Qualifying competition
(Greece) Valentini Grammatikopoulou	2	2
19	(United States) Varvara Lepchenko	6	6

=== Sixth qualifier ===
First round
6	(United States) Christina McHale	5	6^{6}
(United States) Francesca Di Lorenzo	7	7^{8}
(Russia) Varvara Flink	6^{5}	3
(Italy) Giulia Gatto-Monticone	7^{7}	6
(Georgia (country)) Ekaterine Gorgodze	6	2	6
(China) Lu Jiajing	4	6	2
(Ukraine) Katarina Zavatska	3	7	2
16	(Brazil) Beatriz Haddad Maia	6	5	3^{r}

Second round
(United States) Francesca Di Lorenzo	7^{7}	3	3
(Italy) Giulia Gatto-Monticone	6^{5}	6	6
(Georgia (country)) Ekaterine Gorgodze	0	4
(Ukraine) Katarina Zavatska	6	6

Qualifying competition
(Italy) Giulia Gatto-Monticone	4	7	6
(Ukraine) Katarina Zavatska	6	5	3

=== Seventh qualifier ===
First round
7	(Belgium) Ysaline Bonaventure	4	6^{4}
(Germany) Antonia Lottner	6	7^{7}
PR	(Turkey) Başak Eraydın	3	1
WC	(France) Elsa Jacquemot	6	6
(South Korea) Han Na-lae	3	3
(Spain) Georgina García Pérez	6	6
(Uzbekistan) Sabina Sharipova	1	7	3
13	(Serbia) Olga Danilović	6	5	6

Second round
(Germany) Antonia Lottner	7^{7}	6
WC	(France) Elsa Jacquemot	6^{1}	2
(Spain) Georgina García Pérez	6	2	6
13	(Serbia) Olga Danilović	4	6	2

Qualifying competition
(Germany) Antonia Lottner	6	6
(Spain) Georgina García Pérez	3	4

=== Eighth qualifier ===
First round
8	(Russia) Natalia Vikhlyantseva	6	6
(Belgium) Yanina Wickmayer	3	0
(Belgium) Greet Minnen	7	4	6
WC	(France) Margot Yerolymos	5	6	4
(Liechtenstein) Kathinka von Deichmann	3	6	6
(Netherlands) Lesley Kerkhove	6	4	0
(Russia) Sofya Zhuk	6	6
20	(Netherlands) Arantxa Rus	1	4

Second round
8	(Russia) Natalia Vikhlyantseva	6	2	4
(Belgium) Greet Minnen	2	6	6
(Liechtenstein) Kathinka von Deichmann	6	3	4
(Russia) Sofya Zhuk	3	6	6

Qualifying competition
(Belgium) Greet Minnen	2	6	3
(Russia) Sofya Zhuk	6	3	6

=== Ninth qualifier ===
First round
9	(Russia) Anna Blinkova	6	6
WC	(France) Loudmilla Bencheikh	3	2
(Ukraine) Anhelina Kalinina	2	7^{7}	6
(Romania) Irina Bara	6	6^{1}	2
(Israel) Julia Glushko	7	6
(Bulgaria) Viktoriya Tomova	5	2
(United States) Robin Anderson	6	2	5
17	(Czech Republic) Barbora Krejčíková	4	6	1^{r}

Second round
9	(Russia) Anna Blinkova	3	6	6
(Ukraine) Anhelina Kalinina	6	3	2
(Israel) Julia Glushko	6	6
(United States) Robin Anderson	3	3

Qualifying competition
9	(Russia) Anna Blinkova	0	6	6
(Israel) Julia Glushko	6	4	4

=== Tenth qualifier ===
First round
10	(Czech Republic) Marie Bouzková	6	6
(Czech Republic) Tereza Martincová	3	3
(Japan) Ayano Shimizu	6	2	6
(China) Liu Fangzhou	1	6	2
(Russia) Liudmila Samsonova	6^{4}	7	7^{7}
(Italy) Martina Di Giuseppe	7^{7}	5	6^{2}
(United States) Claire Liu	6	3	6^{10}
23	(United States) Sachia Vickery	4	6	7^{12}

Second round
10	(Czech Republic) Marie Bouzková	6	6
(Japan) Ayano Shimizu	2	3
(Russia) Liudmila Samsonova	7	6
23	(United States) Sachia Vickery	5	2

Qualifying competition
10	(Czech Republic) Marie Bouzková	4	3
(Russia) Liudmila Samsonova	6	6

=== Eleventh qualifier ===
First round
11	(United States) Whitney Osuigwe	2	7^{7}	7
WC	(France) Myrtille Georges	6	6^{3}	5
PR	(France) Océane Dodin	0	4
(United States) Allie Kiick	6	6
(Italy) Jasmine Paolini	6	6
(Germany) Anna Zaja	2	4
(Slovakia) Rebecca Šramková	3	7^{7}	6
24	(China) Peng Shuai	6	6^{5}	0

Second round
11	(United States) Whitney Osuigwe	6	3	1
(United States) Allie Kiick	0	6	6
(Italy) Jasmine Paolini	7	6
(Slovakia) Rebecca Šramková	5	0

Qualifying competition
(United States) Allie Kiick	1	4
(Italy) Jasmine Paolini	6	6

=== Twelfth qualifier ===
First round
12	(Japan) Nao Hibino	6	7^{8}
WC	(France) Manon Léonard	2	6^{6}
(Poland) Magdalena Fręch	4	6	3
(Netherlands) Richèl Hogenkamp	6	1	6
(Canada) Rebecca Marino	6^{5}	6	7
WC	(France) Tessah Andrianjafitrimo	7^{7}	4	5
(Chinese Taipei) Liang En-shuo	1	2
22	(Kazakhstan) Elena Rybakina	6	6

Second round
12	(Japan) Nao Hibino	6	6
(Netherlands) Richèl Hogenkamp	1	2
(Canada) Rebecca Marino	7	6^{4}	4
22	(Kazakhstan) Elena Rybakina	5	7^{7}	6

Qualifying competition
12	(Japan) Nao Hibino	5	5
22	(Kazakhstan) Elena Rybakina	7	7
