= 2019 French Open – Day-by-day summaries =

The 2019 French Open described below in detail, in form of day-by-day summaries.

All dates are in CEST.

== Day 1 (26 May) ==
- Schedule of play
- Seeds out:
  - Men's singles: (Italy) Marco Cecchinato [16]
  - Women's singles: (Germany) Angelique Kerber [5]

Matches on main courts
Matches on Court Philippe Chatrier (Center Court)
Event	Winner	Loser	Score
Women's singles – 1st round	(Russia) Anastasia Potapova	(Germany) Angelique Kerber [5]	6–4, 6–2
Men's singles – 1st round	(Greece) Stefanos Tsitsipas [6]	(Germany) Maximilian Marterer	6–2, 6–2, 7–6^{(7–4)}
Men's singles – 1st round	(Switzerland) Roger Federer [3]	(Italy) Lorenzo Sonego	6−2, 6−4, 6−4
Women's singles – 1st round	(Czech Republic) Karolína Plíšková [2]	(United States) Madison Brengle	6–2, 6–3
Matches on Court Suzanne Lenglen (Grandstand)
Event	Winner	Loser	Score
Men's singles – 1st round	(Croatia) Marin Čilić [11]	(Italy) Thomas Fabbiano	6–3, 7–5, 6–1
Men's singles – 1st round	(Japan) Kei Nishikori [7]	(France) Quentin Halys [WC]	6–2, 6–3, 6–4
Women's singles – 1st round	(France) Kristina Mladenovic	(France) Fiona Ferro	6–3, 7–6^{(7–3)}
Women's singles – 1st round	(United States) Sloane Stephens [7]	(Japan) Misaki Doi	6–3, 7–6^{(7–4)}
Matches on Court Simonne Mathieu
Event	Winner	Loser	Score
Women's singles – 1st round	(Spain) Garbiñe Muguruza [19]	(United States) Taylor Townsend	5–7, 6–2, 6–2
Men's singles – 1st round	(France) Nicolas Mahut [WC]	(Italy) Marco Cecchinato [16]	2–6, 6–7^{(6–8)}, 6–4, 6–2, 6–4
Women's singles – 1st round	(Ukraine) Elina Svitolina [9]	(United States) Venus Williams	6–3, 6–3
Men's singles – 1st round	(Belgium) David Goffin [27]	(Lithuania) Ričardas Berankis	6–0, 6–2, 6–2

== Day 2 (27 May) ==
- Schedule of play
- Seeds out:
  - Men's singles: (Russia) Daniil Medvedev [12], (Georgia (country)) Nikoloz Basilashvili [15], (Canada) Denis Shapovalov [20], (United States) Frances Tiafoe [32]
  - Women's singles: (Denmark) Caroline Wozniacki [13], (Germany) Julia Görges [18], (Romania) Mihaela Buzărnescu [30], (Belarus) Aliaksandra Sasnovich [32]

Matches on main courts
Matches on Court Philippe Chatrier (Center Court)
Event	Winner	Loser	Score
Women's singles – 1st round	(Russia) Veronika Kudermetova	(Denmark) Caroline Wozniacki [13]	0–6, 6–3, 6–3
Men's singles – 1st round	(Spain) Rafael Nadal [2]	(Germany) Yannick Hanfmann [Q]	6–2, 6–1, 6–3
Men's singles – 1st round	(Serbia) Novak Djokovic [1]	(Poland) Hubert Hurkacz	6–4, 6–2, 6–2
Women's singles – 1st round	(United States) Serena Williams [10]	(Russia) Vitalia Diatchenko	2–6, 6–1, 6–0
Matches on Court Suzanne Lenglen (Grandstand)
Event	Winner	Loser	Score
Women's singles – 1st round	(Netherlands) Kiki Bertens [4]	(France) Pauline Parmentier	6–3, 6–4
Women's singles – 1st round	(Romania) Sorana Cîrstea	(Slovenia) Kaja Juvan [LL]	5–7, 6–4, 7–5
Men's singles – 1st round	(France) Jo-Wilfried Tsonga [PR]	(Germany) Peter Gojowczyk	7–6^{(7–4)}, 6–1, 4–6, 6–3
Men's singles – 1st round	(Austria) Dominic Thiem [4]	(United States) Tommy Paul [WC]	6–4, 4–6, 7–6^{(7–5)}, 6–2
Matches on Court Simonne Mathieu
Event	Winner	Loser	Score
Women's singles – 1st round	(Slovakia) Viktória Kužmová	(France) Alizé Cornet	6–4, 6–3
Men's singles – 1st round	(France) Richard Gasquet	(Germany) Mischa Zverev	6–3, 6–4, 6–3
Men's singles – 1st round	(Switzerland) Stan Wawrinka [24]	(Slovakia) Jozef Kovalík [PR]	6–1, 6–7^{(3–7)}, 6–2, 6–3
Women's singles – 1st round	(Australia) Samantha Stosur	(Czech Republic) Barbora Strýcová	6–2, 7–6^{(7–3)}

== Day 3 (28 May) ==
- Schedule of play
- Seeds out:
  - Women's singles: (Estonia) Anett Kontaveit [17]
  - Men's doubles: (United Kingdom) Jamie Murray / (Brazil) Bruno Soares [2], (South Africa) Raven Klaasen / (New Zealand) Michael Venus [6], (Argentina) Máximo González / (Argentina) Horacio Zeballos [9], (Croatia) Ivan Dodig / (France) Édouard Roger-Vasselin [12], (Japan) Ben McLachlan / (Germany) Jan-Lennard Struff [15], (United States) Austin Krajicek / (New Zealand) Artem Sitak [16]

Matches on main courts
Matches on Court Philippe Chatrier (Center Court)
Event	Winner	Loser	Score
Men's singles – 1st round	(Germany) Alexander Zverev [5]	(Australia) John Millman	7−6^{(7−4)}, 6−3, 2−6, 6−7^{(5−7)}, 6−3
Women's singles – 1st round	(Japan) Naomi Osaka [1]	(Slovakia) Anna Karolína Schmiedlová	0−6, 7−6^{(7−4)}, 6−1
Women's singles – 1st round	(Romania) Simona Halep [3]	(Australia) Ajla Tomljanović	6−2, 3−6, 6−1
Men's singles – 1st round	(France) Gaël Monfils [14]	(Japan) Taro Daniel	6−0, 6−4, 6−1
Matches on Court Suzanne Lenglen (Grandstand)
Event	Winner	Loser	Score
Men's singles – 1st round	(Argentina) Juan Martín del Potro [8]	(Chile) Nicolás Jarry	3–6, 6–2, 6–1, 6–4
Women's singles – 1st round	(France) Caroline Garcia [24]	(Germany) Mona Barthel	6−2, 6−4
Men's singles – 1st round	(France) Lucas Pouille [22]	(Italy) Simone Bolelli [Q]	6−3, 6−4, 7−5
Women's singles – 1st round	(United States) Madison Keys [14]	(Russia) Evgeniya Rodina	6−1, 6−2
Matches on Court Simonne Mathieu
Event	Winner	Loser	Score
Men's singles – 1st round	(Italy) Fabio Fognini [9]	(Italy) Andreas Seppi	6–3, 6–0, 3–6, 6–3
Women's singles – 1st round	(Belarus) Victoria Azarenka	(Latvia) Jeļena Ostapenko	6−4, 7−6^{(7−4)}
Women's singles – 1st round	(Belarus) Aryna Sabalenka [11]	(Slovakia) Dominika Cibulková	7−5, 6−1
Men's singles – 1st round	(France) Adrian Mannarino	(Italy) Stefano Travaglia [Q]	6−7^{(5−7)}, 6−3, 3−6, 6−2, 6−2

== Day 4 (29 May) ==
- Schedule of play
- Seeds out:
  - Men's singles: (Croatia) Marin Čilić [11], (Argentina) Guido Pella [19], (Australia) Alex de Minaur [21], (Italy) Matteo Berrettini [29]
  - Women's singles: (Netherlands) Kiki Bertens [4]
  - Men's doubles: (Croatia) Nikola Mektić / (Croatia) Franko Škugor [5]
  - Women's doubles: (Japan) Eri Hozumi / (Japan) Makoto Ninomiya [12], (Romania) Irina-Camelia Begu / (Romania) Mihaela Buzărnescu [14]

Matches on main courts
Matches on Court Philippe Chatrier (Center Court)
Event	Winner	Loser	Score
Women's singles – 2nd round	(United States) Sloane Stephens [7]	(Spain) Sara Sorribes Tormo	6–3, 7–6^{(7−3)}
Men's singles – 2nd round	(Japan) Kei Nishikori [7]	(France) Jo-Wilfried Tsonga [PR]	4–6, 6–4, 6–4, 6–4
Men's singles – 2nd round	(Switzerland) Roger Federer [3]	(Germany) Oscar Otte [LL]	6−4, 6−3, 6−4
Women's singles – 2nd round	(Slovakia) Viktória Kužmová	(Netherlands) Kiki Bertens [4]	3–1, retired
Women's singles – 2nd round	(Switzerland) Belinda Bencic [15] vs (Germany) Laura Siegemund		4−6, 6−4, 4−4, suspended
Matches on Court Suzanne Lenglen (Grandstand)
Event	Winner	Loser	Score
Women's singles – 2nd round	(Spain) Garbiñe Muguruza [19]	(Sweden) Johanna Larsson	6–4, 6–1
Men's singles – 2nd round	(Spain) Rafael Nadal [2]	(Germany) Yannick Maden [Q]	6−1, 6−2, 6−4
Women's singles – 2nd round	(Croatia) Petra Martić [31]	(France) Kristina Mladenovic	6−2, 6−1
Men's singles – 2nd round	(France) Benoît Paire	(France) Pierre-Hugues Herbert	6−2, 6−2, 5−7, 6−7^{(6−8)}, 11−9
Matches on Court Simonne Mathieu
Event	Winner	Loser	Score
Men's singles – 2nd round	(Greece) Stefanos Tsitsipas [6]	(Bolivia) Hugo Dellien	4−6, 6−0, 6−3, 7−5
Women's singles – 2nd round	(Czech Republic) Karolína Plíšková [2]	(Slovakia) Kristína Kučová [Q]	6−2, 6−2
Men's singles – 2nd round	(Bulgaria) Grigor Dimitrov	(Croatia) Marin Čilić [11]	6−7^{(3−7)}, 6−4, 4−6, 7−6^{(7−2)}, 6−3

== Day 5 (30 May) ==
- Schedule of play
- Seeds out:
  - Men's singles: (Argentina) Diego Schwartzman [17], (Spain) Fernando Verdasco [23], (France) Gilles Simon [26], (United Kingdom) Kyle Edmund [28]
  - Women's singles: (Belarus) Aryna Sabalenka [11], (China) Wang Qiang [16], (Russia) Daria Kasatkina [21], (Canada) Bianca Andreescu [22], (France) Caroline Garcia [24], (Chinese Taipei) Hsieh Su-wei [25], (Greece) Maria Sakkari [29]
  - Women's doubles: (Czech Republic) Barbora Krejčíková / (Czech Republic) Kateřina Siniaková [1], (Croatia) Darija Jurak / (Romania) Raluca Olaru [16]
  - Mixed Doubles: (Netherlands) Demi Schuurs / (Netherlands) Jean-Julien Rojer [4]

Matches on main courts
Matches on Court Philippe Chatrier (Center Court)
Event	Winner	Loser	Score
Men's singles – 2nd round	(Austria) Dominic Thiem [4]	(Kazakhstan) Alexander Bublik	6−3, 6−7^{(6−8)}, 6−3, 7−5
Women's singles – 2nd round	(Switzerland) Belinda Bencic [15]	(Germany) Laura Siegemund	4−6, 6−4, 6−4
Women's singles – 2nd round	(United States) Serena Williams [10]	(Japan) Kurumi Nara [Q]	6–3, 6–2
Women's singles – 2nd round	(Russia) Anna Blinkova [Q]	(France) Caroline Garcia [24]	1–6, 6–4, 6–4
Men's singles – 2nd round	(Slovakia) Martin Kližan vs (France) Lucas Pouille [22]		7−6^{(7−4)}, 2−6, 6−3, 3−1, suspended
Matches on Court Suzanne Lenglen (Grandstand)
Event	Winner	Loser	Score
Women's singles – 2nd round	(Japan) Naomi Osaka [1]	(Belarus) Victoria Azarenka	4−6, 7−5, 6−3
Men's singles – 2nd round	(Serbia) Novak Djokovic [1]	(Switzerland) Henri Laaksonen [LL]	6−1, 6−4, 6−3
Men's singles – 2nd round	(France) Gaël Monfils [14]	(France) Adrian Mannarino	6−3, 6−4, 6−4
Women's singles – 2nd round	(Romania) Simona Halep [3]	(Poland) Magda Linette	6−4, 5−7, 6−3
Matches on Court Simonne Mathieu
Event	Winner	Loser	Score
Women's singles – 2nd round	(Russia) Ekaterina Alexandrova	(Australia) Samantha Stosur	3−6, 6−1, 6−4
Men's singles – 2nd round	(Germany) Alexander Zverev [5]	(Sweden) Mikael Ymer [Q]	6–1, 6–3, 7–6^{(7–3)}
Men's singles – 2nd round	(Argentina) Juan Martín del Potro [8]	(Japan) Yoshihito Nishioka	5−7, 6−4, 6−2, 6−7^{(5−7)}, 6−2

== Day 6 (31 May) ==
- Schedule of play
- Seeds out:
  - Men's singles: (France) Lucas Pouille [22], (Belgium) David Goffin [27], (Serbia) Laslo Đere [31]
  - Women's singles: (Czech Republic) Karolína Plíšková [2], (Ukraine) Elina Svitolina [9], (Switzerland) Belinda Bencic [15], (Belgium) Elise Mertens [20], (Spain) Carla Suárez Navarro [28]
  - Women's doubles: (Chinese Taipei) Chan Hao-ching / (Chinese Taipei) Latisha Chan [8], (Germany) Anna-Lena Grönefeld / (Netherlands) Demi Schuurs [9]

Matches on main courts
Matches on Court Philippe Chatrier (Center Court)
Event	Winner	Loser	Score
Women's singles – 3rd round	(Croatia) Petra Martić [31]	(Czech Republic) Karolína Plíšková [2]	6−3, 6−3
Men's singles – 2nd round	(Slovakia) Martin Kližan	(France) Lucas Pouille [22]	7−6^{(7−4)}, 2−6, 6−3, 3−6, 9–7
Women's singles – 3rd round	(Spain) Garbiñe Muguruza [19]	(Ukraine) Elina Svitolina [9]	6−3, 6−3
Men's singles – 3rd round	(Spain) Rafael Nadal [2]	(Belgium) David Goffin [27]	6–1, 6–3, 4–6, 6–3
Men's singles – 3rd round	(Greece) Stefanos Tsitsipas [6] vs (Serbia) Filip Krajinović		7−5, 6−3, 5−5, suspended
Matches on Court Suzanne Lenglen (Grandstand)
Event	Winner	Loser	Score
Women's singles – 3rd round	(Latvia) Anastasija Sevastova [12]	(Belgium) Elise Mertens [20]	6−7^{(3−7)}, 6−4, 11−9
Men's singles – 3rd round	(Switzerland) Roger Federer [3]	(Norway) Casper Ruud	6−3, 6−1, 7−6^{(10−8)}
Women's singles – 3rd round	(United States) Sloane Stephens [7]	(Slovenia) Polona Hercog	6–3, 5–7, 6–4
Matches on Court Simonne Mathieu
Event	Winner	Loser	Score
Women's singles – 3rd round	(Czech Republic) Markéta Vondroušová	(Spain) Carla Suárez Navarro [28]	6−4, 6−4
Men's singles – 3rd round	(France) Benoît Paire	(Spain) Pablo Carreño Busta	6–2, 4–6, 7–6^{(7–1)}, retired
Men's singles – 3rd round	(Argentina) Leonardo Mayer	(France) Nicolas Mahut [WC]	3–6, 7–6^{(7–3)}, 6–4, 7–6^{(7–3)}
Women's singles – 3rd round	(United Kingdom) Johanna Konta [26]	(Slovakia) Viktória Kužmová	6−2, 6−1

== Day 7 (1 June) ==
- Schedule of play
- Seeds out:
  - Men's singles: (Croatia) Borna Ćorić [13], (Spain) Roberto Bautista Agut [18], (Serbia) Dušan Lajović [30]
  - Women's singles: (Japan) Naomi Osaka [1], (United States) Serena Williams [10], (Ukraine) Lesia Tsurenko [27]
  - Men's doubles: (Poland) Łukasz Kubot / (Brazil) Marcelo Melo [1], (United States) Bob Bryan / (United States) Mike Bryan [7], (France) Nicolas Mahut / (Austria) Jürgen Melzer [13]
  - Women's doubles: (Poland) Alicja Rosolska / (China) Yang Zhaoxuan [13]

Matches on main courts
Matches on Court Philippe Chatrier (Center Court)
Event	Winner	Loser	Score
Women's singles – 3rd round	(Romania) Simona Halep [3]	(Ukraine) Lesia Tsurenko [27]	6–2, 6–1
Men's singles – 3rd round	(Greece) Stefanos Tsitsipas [6]	(Serbia) Filip Krajinović	7−5, 6−3, 6−7^{(5–7)}, 7–6^{(8–6)}
Men's singles – 3rd round	(Serbia) Novak Djokovic [1]	(Italy) Salvatore Caruso [Q]	6−3, 6−3, 6−2
Men's singles – 3rd round	(France) Gaël Monfils [14]	(France) Antoine Hoang [WC]	6−3, 6−2, 6−3
Women's singles – 3rd round	(United States) Sofia Kenin	(United States) Serena Williams [10]	6−2, 7−5
Matches on Court Suzanne Lenglen (Grandstand)
Event	Winner	Loser	Score
Men's singles – 3rd round	(Italy) Fabio Fognini [9]	(Spain) Roberto Bautista Agut [18]	7–6^{(7–5)}, 6−4, 4−6, 6−1
Women's singles – 3rd round	(Czech Republic) Kateřina Siniaková	(Japan) Naomi Osaka [1]	6−4, 6−2
Men's singles – 3rd round	(Austria) Dominic Thiem [4]	(Uruguay) Pablo Cuevas	6−3, 4−6, 6−2, 7−5
Women's singles – 3rd round	(Australia) Ashleigh Barty [8]	(Germany) Andrea Petkovic	6−3, 6−1
Matches on Court Simonne Mathieu
Event	Winner	Loser	Score
Men's singles – 3rd round	(Germany) Alexander Zverev [5]	(Serbia) Dušan Lajović [30]	6−4, 6−2, 4−6, 1–6, 6−2
Women's singles – 3rd round	(United States) Madison Keys [14]	(Russia) Anna Blinkova [Q]	6–3, 6–7^{(5–7)}, 6–4
Men's singles – 3rd round	(Argentina) Juan Martín del Potro [8]	(Australia) Jordan Thompson	6–4, 6–4, 6–0

== Day 8 (2 June) ==
- Schedule of play
- Seeds out:
  - Men's singles: (Greece) Stefanos Tsitsipas [6]
  - Women's singles: (Latvia) Anastasija Sevastova [12], (Spain) Garbiñe Muguruza [19], (Croatia) Donna Vekić [23]
  - Men's doubles: (Austria) Oliver Marach / (Croatia) Mate Pavić [4], (Finland) Henri Kontinen / (Australia) John Peers [8], (Netherlands) Robin Haase / (Denmark) Frederik Nielsen [14]
  - Women's doubles: (Chinese Taipei) Hsieh Su-wei / (Czech Republic) Barbora Strýcová [3]
  - Mixed doubles: (Germany) Anna-Lena Grönefeld / (Colombia) Robert Farah [8]

Matches on main courts
Matches on Court Philippe Chatrier (Center Court)
Event	Winner	Loser	Score
Women's singles – 4th round	(Croatia) Petra Martić [31]	(Estonia) Kaia Kanepi	5–7, 6–2, 6–4
Men's singles – 4th round	(Switzerland) Roger Federer [3]	(Argentina) Leonardo Mayer	6−2, 6−3, 6−3
Men's singles – 4th round	(Spain) Rafael Nadal [2]	(Argentina) Juan Ignacio Londero	6−2, 6−3, 6−3
Women's singles – 4th round	(United States) Sloane Stephens [7]	(Spain) Garbiñe Muguruza [19]	6−4, 6−3
Matches on Court Suzanne Lenglen (Grandstand)
Event	Winner	Loser	Score
Women's singles – 4th round	(Czech Republic) Markéta Vondroušová	(Latvia) Anastasija Sevastova [12]	6–2, 6–0
Women's singles – 4th round	(United Kingdom) Johanna Konta [26]	(Croatia) Donna Vekić [23]	6–2, 6–4
Men's singles – 4th round	(Switzerland) Stan Wawrinka [24]	(Greece) Stefanos Tsitsipas [6]	7–6^{(8–6)}, 5–7, 6–4, 3–6, 8–6
Men's singles – 4th round	(Japan) Kei Nishikori [7] vs (France) Benoît Paire		6–2, 6–7^{(8–10)}, 6–2, suspended
Matches on Court Simonne Mathieu
Event	Winner	Loser	Score
Men's doubles - 3rd round	(Argentina) Guido Pella (Argentina) Diego Schwartzman	(France) Grégoire Barrère [WC] (France) Quentin Halys [WC]	6–4, 6–4
Women's doubles - 3rd round	(Hungary) Tímea Babos [2] (France) Kristina Mladenovic [2]	(Germany) Anna-Lena Friedsam [PR] (Germany) Laura Siegemund [PR]	4–6, 6–3, 6–3
Men's doubles - 3rd round	(Germany) Kevin Krawietz (Germany) Andreas Mies	(Austria) Oliver Marach [4] (Croatia) Mate Pavić [4]	7–5, 3–6, 7–5
Mixed doubles - 2nd round	(China) Zhang Shuai [5] (Australia) John Peers [5]	(Hungary) Tímea Babos (Hungary) Márton Fucsovics	6−0, 6−4
Women's doubles - 3rd round	(Belgium) Kirsten Flipkens [15] (Sweden) Johanna Larsson [15]	(Ukraine) Nadiia Kichenok (United States) Abigail Spears	6−3, 6−2

== Day 9 (3 June) ==
- Schedule of play
- Seeds out:
  - Men's singles: (Argentina) Juan Martín del Potro [8], (Italy) Fabio Fognini [9], (France) Gaël Monfils [14]
  - Men's doubles: (Netherlands) Jean-Julien Rojer / (Romania) Horia Tecău [10]
  - Women's doubles: (Czech Republic) Lucie Hradecká / (Slovenia) Andreja Klepač [10], (Belarus) Victoria Azarenka / (Australia) Ashleigh Barty [11]
  - Mixed Doubles: (Chinese Taipei) Chan Hao-ching / (Austria) Oliver Marach [6], (Poland) Alicja Rosolska / (Croatia) Nikola Mektić [7]

Matches on main courts
Matches on Court Philippe Chatrier (Center Court)
Event	Winner	Loser	Score
Women's singles – 4th round	(Australia) Ashleigh Barty [8]	(United States) Sofia Kenin	6−3, 3−6, 6−0
Men's singles – 4th round	(Serbia) Novak Djokovic [1]	(Germany) Jan-Lennard Struff	6−3, 6−2, 6−2
Men's singles – 4th round	(Austria) Dominic Thiem [4]	(France) Gaël Monfils [14]	6–4, 6–4, 6–2
Women's singles – 4th round	(Romania) Simona Halep [3]	(Poland) Iga Świątek	6–1, 6–0
Matches on Court Suzanne Lenglen (Grandstand)
Event	Winner	Loser	Score
Women's singles – 4th round	(United States) Madison Keys [14]	(Czech Republic) Kateřina Siniaková	6–2, 6–4
Men's singles – 4th round	(Japan) Kei Nishikori [7]	(France) Benoît Paire	6–2, 6–7^{(8–10)}, 6–2, 6–7^{(8–10)}, 7–5
Men's singles – 4th round	(Germany) Alexander Zverev [5]	(Italy) Fabio Fognini [9]	3−6, 6−2, 6−2, 7−6^{(7−5)}
Men's singles – 4th round	(Russia) Karen Khachanov [10]	(Argentina) Juan Martín del Potro [8]	7–5, 6–3, 3–6, 6–3
Matches on Court Simonne Mathieu
Event	Winner	Loser	Score
Men's doubles – Quarterfinals	(Argentina) Guido Pella (Argentina) Diego Schwartzman	(Netherlands) Jean-Julien Rojer [10] (Romania) Horia Tecău [10]	6−4, 6−4
Men's doubles – Quarterfinals	(Colombia) Juan Sebastián Cabal [3] (Colombia) Robert Farah [3]	(Kazakhstan) Mikhail Kukushkin (Belgium) Joran Vliegen	6–2, 6–2
Women's doubles - 3rd round	(Canada) Gabriela Dabrowski [4] (China) Xu Yifan [4]	(France) Fiona Ferro (France) Diane Parry	6–1, 7–6^{(7–5)}
Mixed doubles - 3rd round	(Ukraine) Nadiia Kichenok [Alt] (Pakistan) Aisam-ul-Haq Qureshi [Alt]	(Chinese Taipei) Chan Hao-ching [6] (Austria) Oliver Marach [6]	6−3, 6−4
Women's singles – 4th round	(United States) Amanda Anisimova	(Spain) Aliona Bolsova [Q]	6–3, 6–0

== Day 10 (4 June) ==
- Schedule of play
- Seeds out:
  - Men's singles: (Japan) Kei Nishikori [7], (Switzerland) Stan Wawrinka [24]
  - Women's singles: (United States) Sloane Stephens [7], (Croatia) Petra Martić [31]
  - Men's doubles: (United States) Rajeev Ram / (United Kingdom) Joe Salisbury [11]
  - Women's doubles: (Canada) Gabriela Dabrowski / (China) Xu Yifan [4], (Australia) Samantha Stosur / (China) Zhang Shuai [5], (United States) Nicole Melichar / (Czech Republic) Květa Peschke [7]
  - Mixed Doubles: (China) Zhang Shuai / (Australia) John Peers [5]

Matches on main courts
Matches on Court Philippe Chatrier (Center Court)
Event	Winner	Loser	Score
Women's singles – Quarterfinals	(United Kingdom) Johanna Konta [26]	(United States) Sloane Stephens [7]	6−1, 6−4
Men's singles – Quarterfinals	(Spain) Rafael Nadal [2]	(Japan) Kei Nishikori [7]	6−1, 6−1, 6−3
Matches on Court Suzanne Lenglen (Grandstand)
Event	Winner	Loser	Score
Men's singles – Quarterfinals	(Switzerland) Roger Federer [3]	(Switzerland) Stan Wawrinka [24]	7−6^{(7−4)}, 4−6, 7−6^{(7−5)}, 6−4
Women's singles – Quarterfinals	(Czech Republic) Markéta Vondroušová	(Croatia) Petra Martić [31]	7−6^{(7−1)}, 7−5
Matches on Court Simonne Mathieu
Event	Winner	Loser	Score
Legends over 45 doubles round robin	(Sweden) Mikael Pernfors (Sweden) Mats Wilander	(France) Arnaud Boetsch (France) Cédric Pioline	6−7^{(5−7)}, 7−5, [10−8]
Women's doubles – Quarterfinals	(Hungary) Tímea Babos [2] (France) Kristina Mladenovic [2]	(Australia) Samantha Stosur [5] (China) Zhang Shuai [5]	3−6, 6−1, 7−6^{(7−3)}
Women's doubles – Quarterfinals	(Belgium) Kirsten Flipkens [15] (Sweden) Johanna Larsson [15]	(United States) Nicole Melichar [7] (Czech Republic) Květa Peschke [7]	3–6, 7–6^{(7–4)}, 6–1
Men's doubles – Quarterfinals	(France) Jérémy Chardy (France) Fabrice Martin	(United States) Rajeev Ram [11] (United Kingdom) Joe Salisbury [11]	6−4, 7−6^{(8−6)}

== Day 11 (5 June) ==
For the first time since 2016, all of the scheduled matches were disrupted by weather conditions and play was cancelled.

- Schedule of play

== Day 12 (6 June) ==
Play would normally start at 1500 CEST, but due to inclement weather on the previous day, matches started at 1200 CEST. The women's semifinal match that was scheduled to be played was moved to Friday, 7 June.

- Schedule of play
- Seeds out:
  - Men's singles: (Germany) Alexander Zverev [5], (Russia) Karen Khachanov [10]
  - Women's singles: (Romania) Simona Halep [3], (United States) Madison Keys [14]
  - Men's doubles: (Colombia) Juan Sebastián Cabal / (Colombia) Robert Farah [3]
  - Mixed Doubles: (United States) Nicole Melichar / (Brazil) Bruno Soares [1]

Matches on main courts
Matches on Court Philippe Chatrier (Center Court)
Event	Winner	Loser	Score
Women's singles – Quarterfinals	(United States) Amanda Anisimova	(Romania) Simona Halep [3]	6−2, 6−4
Men's singles – Quarterfinals	(Serbia) Novak Djokovic [1]	(Germany) Alexander Zverev [5]	7−5, 6−2, 6−2
Men's doubles – Semifinals	(France) Jérémy Chardy (France) Fabrice Martin	(Colombia) Juan Sebastián Cabal [3] (Colombia) Robert Farah [3]	7−5, 6−4
Matches on Court Suzanne Lenglen (Grandstand)
Event	Winner	Loser	Score
Women's singles – Quarterfinals	(Australia) Ashleigh Barty [8]	(United States) Madison Keys [14]	6−3, 7−5
Men's singles – Quarterfinals	(Austria) Dominic Thiem [4]	(Russia) Karen Khachanov [10]	6−2, 6−4, 6−2
Men's doubles – Semifinals	(Germany) Kevin Krawietz (Germany) Andreas Mies	(Argentina) Guido Pella (Argentina) Diego Schwartzman	7−5, 6−3
Matches on Court Simonne Mathieu
Event	Winner	Loser	Score
Legends under 45 doubles round robin	(Russia) Yevgeny Kafelnikov (Russia) Marat Safin	(France) Sébastien Grosjean (France) Michaël Llodra	3−6, 7−5, [10−6]
Mixed doubles – Semifinals	(Chinese Taipei) Latisha Chan (Croatia) Ivan Dodig	(United States) Nicole Melichar [1] (Brazil) Bruno Soares [1]	6−2, 6−1
Women's doubles – Quarterfinals	(Belgium) Elise Mertens [6] (Belarus) Aryna Sabalenka [6]	(Ukraine) Lyudmyla Kichenok (Latvia) Jeļena Ostapenko	7−5, 6−2
Legends under 45 doubles round robin	(Germany) Tommy Haas (France) Paul-Henri Mathieu	(Russia) Yevgeny Kafelnikov (Russia) Marat Safin	7−5, 6−3
Legends over 45 doubles round robin	(Spain) Sergi Bruguera (Croatia) Goran Ivanišević	(France) Mansour Bahrami (France) Fabrice Santoro	4−6, 6−1, [10−8]
Legends under 45 doubles round robin	(Spain) Juan Carlos Ferrero (Ukraine) Andriy Medvedev	(United States) James Blake (Australia) Mark Philippoussis	6−2, 7−5

== Day 13 (7 June) ==
- Schedule of play
- Seeds out:
  - Men's singles: (Switzerland) Roger Federer [3]
  - Women's singles: (United Kingdom) Johanna Konta [26]
  - Women's doubles: (Belgium) Elise Mertens / (Belarus) Aryna Sabalenka [6], (Belgium) Kirsten Flipkens / (Sweden) Johanna Larsson [15]
  - Mixed doubles: (Canada) Gabriela Dabrowski / (Croatia) Mate Pavić [2]

Matches on main courts
Matches on Court Philippe Chatrier (Center Court)
Event	Winner	Loser	Score
Men's singles – Semifinals	(Spain) Rafael Nadal [2]	(Switzerland) Roger Federer [3]	6−3, 6−4, 6−2
Men's singles – Semifinals	(Serbia) Novak Djokovic [1] vs (Austria) Dominic Thiem [4]		2–6, 6–3, 1–3, suspended
Matches on Court Suzanne Lenglen (Grandstand)
Event	Winner	Loser	Score
Women's singles – Semifinals	(Australia) Ashleigh Barty [8]	(United States) Amanda Anisimova	6−7^{(4−7)}, 6−3, 6−3
Women's doubles – Semifinals	(Hungary) Tímea Babos [2] (France) Kristina Mladenovic [2]	(Belgium) Elise Mertens [6] (Belarus) Aryna Sabalenka [6]	6–2, 6–1
Matches on Court Simonne Mathieu
Event	Winner	Loser	Score
Women's singles – Semifinals	(Czech Republic) Markéta Vondroušová	(United Kingdom) Johanna Konta [26]	7−5, 7−6^{(7−2)}
Mixed doubles – Final	(Chinese Taipei) Latisha Chan (Croatia) Ivan Dodig	(Canada) Gabriela Dabrowski [2] (Croatia) Mate Pavić [2]	6–1, 7–6^{(7–5)}
Women's legends doubles round robin	(France) Nathalie Dechy (France) Amélie Mauresmo	(France) Marion Bartoli (Croatia) Iva Majoli	6–2, 6–0

== Day 14 (8 June) ==
- Schedule of play
- Seeds out:
  - Men's singles: (Serbia) Novak Djokovic [1]

Matches on main courts
Matches on Court Philippe Chatrier (Center Court)
Event	Winner	Loser	Score
Men's singles – Semifinals	(Austria) Dominic Thiem [4]	(Serbia) Novak Djokovic [1]	6–2, 3–6, 7–5, 5–7, 7–5
Women's singles – Final	(Australia) Ashleigh Barty [8]	(Czech Republic) Markéta Vondroušová	6−1, 6−3
Men's doubles – Final	(Germany) Kevin Krawietz (Germany) Andreas Mies	(France) Jérémy Chardy (France) Fabrice Martin	6−2, 7−6^{(7−3)}
Matches on Court Suzanne Lenglen (Grandstand)
Event	Winner	Loser	Score
Legends over 45 doubles round robin	(Sweden) Mikael Pernfors (Sweden) Mats Wilander	(United States) Michael Chang (United States) John McEnroe	6−4, 7−5
Women's legends doubles final	(France) Nathalie Dechy (France) Amélie Mauresmo	(United States) Martina Navratilova (Russia) Dinara Safina	6–3, 6–4
Legends over 45 doubles round robin	(France) Mansour Bahrami (France) Fabrice Santoro	(Australia) Pat Cash (France) Henri Leconte	6–4, 6–2
Legends under 45 doubles round robin	(France) Sébastien Grosjean (France) Michaël Llodra	(Germany) Tommy Haas (France) Paul-Henri Mathieu	6−4, 7−5

== Day 15 (9 June) ==
Rafael Nadal won his 12th French Open, an extended record breaking 12th title in a single Grand Slam tournament, surpassed Margaret Court's overall titles in a single Major. By capturing his 18th Grand Slam title, Nadal closed the gap on Roger Federer's record of 20 Grand Slam titles, and it is the first time that the gap of slams between the two has been down to just 2 since Federer overhauled Pete Sampras' then record of 14 Grand Slam titles in 2009.

- Schedule of play
- Seeds out:
  - Men's singles: (Austria) Dominic Thiem [4]

Matches on main courts
Matches on Court Philippe Chatrier (Center Court)
Event	Winner	Loser	Score
Women's doubles – Final	(Hungary) Tímea Babos [2] (France) Kristina Mladenovic [2]	(China) Duan Yingying (China) Zheng Saisai	6–2, 6–3
Men's singles – Final	(Spain) Rafael Nadal [2]	(Austria) Dominic Thiem [4]	6–3, 5–7, 6–1, 6–1
Matches on Court Suzanne Lenglen (Grandstand)
Event	Winner	Loser	Score
Legends over 45 doubles final	(Spain) Sergi Bruguera (Croatia) Goran Ivanišević	(Sweden) Mikael Pernfors (Sweden) Mats Wilander	6–2, 4–6, [10–4]
Legends under 45 doubles final	(France) Sébastien Grosjean (France) Michaël Llodra	(Spain) Juan Carlos Ferrero (Ukraine) Andriy Medvedev	7–6^{(7–4)}, 7–5
