= Alexander Zgirovsky =

Belarusian tennis player (born 2001)

- Country (sports): Belarus
- Born: 10 July 2001 (age 25) Minsk, Belarus
- Height: 1.91 m (6 ft 3 in)
- Plays: Right-handed (two-handed backhand)
- Prize money: US $46,387

Singles
- Career record: 0–2 (at ATP Tour level, Grand Slam level, and in Davis Cup)
- Career titles: 0
- Highest ranking: No. 588 (18 September 2023)
- Current ranking: No. 1,369 (10 August 2026)

Grand Slam singles results
- French Open Junior: Q2 (2019)
- Wimbledon Junior: Q1 (2019)
- US Open Junior: 2R (2019)

Doubles
- Career record: 0–0 (at ATP Tour level, Grand Slam level, and in Davis Cup)
- Career titles: 0
- Highest ranking: No. 311 (31 July 2023)
- Current ranking: No. 1,989 (10 August 2026)

Grand Slam doubles results
- French Open Junior: 1R (2019)
- Wimbledon Junior: 2R (2019)
- US Open Junior: F (2019)

Team competitions
- Davis Cup: 0–2
- Last updated on: 21 August 2026.

Alexander Alexandrovich Zgirovsky (Belarusian: Аляксандр Аляксандравіч Згіроўскі; Александр Александрович Згировский; born 10 July 2001) is a Belarusian tennis player. Zgirovsky has a career high ATP singles ranking of No. 588 achieved on 18 September 2023 and a career high doubles ranking of No. 311 achieved on 31 July 2023.

Zgirovsky represented Belarus at the Davis Cup, where he has a W/L record of 0–2.

== ITF Futures/World Tennis Tour finals ==
=== Singles: 1 (1 title) ===
| Legend ITF WTT (1–0) |

| Result | W–L | Date | Tournament | Tier | Surface | Opponent | Score |
|---|---|---|---|---|---|---|---|
| Win | 1–0 | Jun 2023 | M25 Kuršumlijska Banja, Serbia | WTT | Clay | (Romania) Sebastian Gima | 6–4, 6–3 |

=== Doubles: 16 (5 titles, 11 runner-ups) ===
| Legend ITF Futures/WTT (5–11) | Finals by surface Hard (3–8) Clay (2–3) Grass (0–0) Carpet (0–0) |

| Result | W–L | Date | Tournament | Tier | Surface | Partner | Opponents | Score |
|---|---|---|---|---|---|---|---|---|
| Loss | 0–1 | Nov 2018 | Tunisia F40, Monastir | Futures | Hard | (Belarus) Mikalai Haliak | (Canada) Steven Diez (Spain) Sergio Martos Gornés | 3–6, 1–6 |
| Loss | 0–2 | Oct 2021 | M15 Kazan, Russia | WTT | Hard | (Belarus) Aliaksandr Liaonenka | (Uzbekistan) Sanjar Fayziev (Zimbabwe) Benjamin Lock | 2–6, 1–6 |
| Loss | 0–3 | Jul 2022 | M25 Tbilisi, Georgia | WTT | Hard | Aliaksandr Liaonenka | (South Korea) Hong Seong-chan (South Korea) Song Min-kyu | 7–6^{(3–7)}, 6–7^{(3–7)}, [6–10] |
| Win | 1–3 | Sep 2022 | M15 Sharm El Sheikh, Egypt | WTT | Clay | Aliaksandr Liaonenka | (South Africa) Alec Beckley (South Africa) Kris van Wyk | 6–2, 6–0 |
| Win | 2–3 | Oct 2022 | M15 Sharm El Sheikh, Egypt | WTT | Clay | Aliaksandr Liaonenka | (Slovakia) Lukáš Pokorný (Georgia (country)) Saba Purtseladze | 7–5, 6–4 |
| Loss | 2–4 | Nov 2022 | M15 Sharm El Sheikh, Egypt | WTT | Hard | Erik Arutiunian | Alexandr Binda; Ilia Simakin | 3–6, 3–6 |
| Loss | 2–5 | Nov 2022 | M25 Sharm El Sheikh, Egypt | WTT | Hard | (South Africa) Kris van Wyk | (Czech Republic) Marek Gengel (Germany) Mats Rosenkranz | 2–6, 5–7 |
| Win | 3–5 | Mar 2023 | M15 Aktobe, Kazakhstan | WTT | Hard | Aliaksandr Liaonenka | Nikita Ianin; Evgeny Philippov | 6–4, 6–3 |
| Win | 4–5 | Apr 2023 | M25 Tbilisi, Georgia | WTT | Hard | Aliaksandr Liaonenka | Egor Agafonov; Alibek Kachmazov | 6–0, 3–6, [10–5] |
| Win | 5–5 | May 2023 | M15 Tbilisi, Georgia | WTT | Hard | Aliaksandr Liaonenka | (Turkey) Sarp Ağabigün (Kazakhstan) Grigoriy Lomakin | 6–2, 6–2 |
| Loss | 5–6 | Jun 2023 | M15 Kuršumlijska Banja, Serbia | WTT | Clay | Aliaksandr Liaonenka | (Italy) Lorenzo Carboni (Ukraine) Volodymyr Uzhylovskyi | 4–6, 7–5, [5–10] |
| Loss | 5–7 | Jul 2023 | M25 Uriage, France | WTT | Clay | Marat Sharipov | (France) Maxence Beaugé (France) Émilien Voisin | 3–6, 4–6 |
| Loss | 5–8 | Mar 2024 | M15 Aktobe, Kazakhstan | WTT | Hard | Aliaksandr Liaonenka | (Netherlands) Niels Visker; Pavel Verbin | 6–7^{(8–10)}, 3–6 |
| Loss | 5–9 | Mar 2024 | M15 Aktobe, Kazakhstan | WTT | Hard | Aliaksandr Liaonenka | Egor Agafonov; Ilia Simakin | 3–6, 4–6 |
| Loss | 5–10 | May 2024 | M25 Deauville, France | WTT | Clay | Alexey Vatutin | (Netherlands) Sander Jong (Netherlands) Fons van Sambeek | 3–6, 2–6 |
| Loss | 5–11 | Sep 2024 | M15 Monastir, Tunisia | WTT | Hard | Erik Arutiunian | (France) Étienne Donnet (United Kingdom) Ewen Lumsden | 5–7, 6–7^{(3–7)} |

== Junior Grand Slam finals ==
=== Doubles: 1 (1 runner-up) ===
| Result | Year | Tournament | Surface | Partner | Opponents | Score |
|---|---|---|---|---|---|---|
| Loss | 2019 | US Open | Hard | (Czech Republic) Andrew Paulson | (United States) Eliot Spizzirri (United States) Tyler Zink | 6–7^{(4–7)}, 4–6 |

== Davis Cup ==
=== Participations: (0–1) ===
| Group membership World Group (0–0) WG Play-off (0–0) Group I (0–1) Group II (0–0) Group III (0–0) Group IV (0–0) | Matches by surface Hard (0–0) Clay (0–1) Grass (0–0) Carpet (0–0) | Matches by type Singles (0–1) Doubles (0–0) |

- ▲ ▼ indicates the outcome of the Davis Cup match followed by the score, date, place of event, the zonal classification and its phase, and the court surface.

| Rubber outcome | No. | Rubber | Match type (partner if any) | Opponent nation | Opponent player(s) | Score |
▼1–3; 26-27 October 2018; NTC Arena, Bratislava, Slovakia; Euro/Africa Zone Group I Relegation play-off; Clay (indoor) surface
| Defeat | 1 | I | Singles | Slovakia | Martin Kližan | 1–6, 4–6 |
