= Chloe Beck =

American tennis player (born 2001)

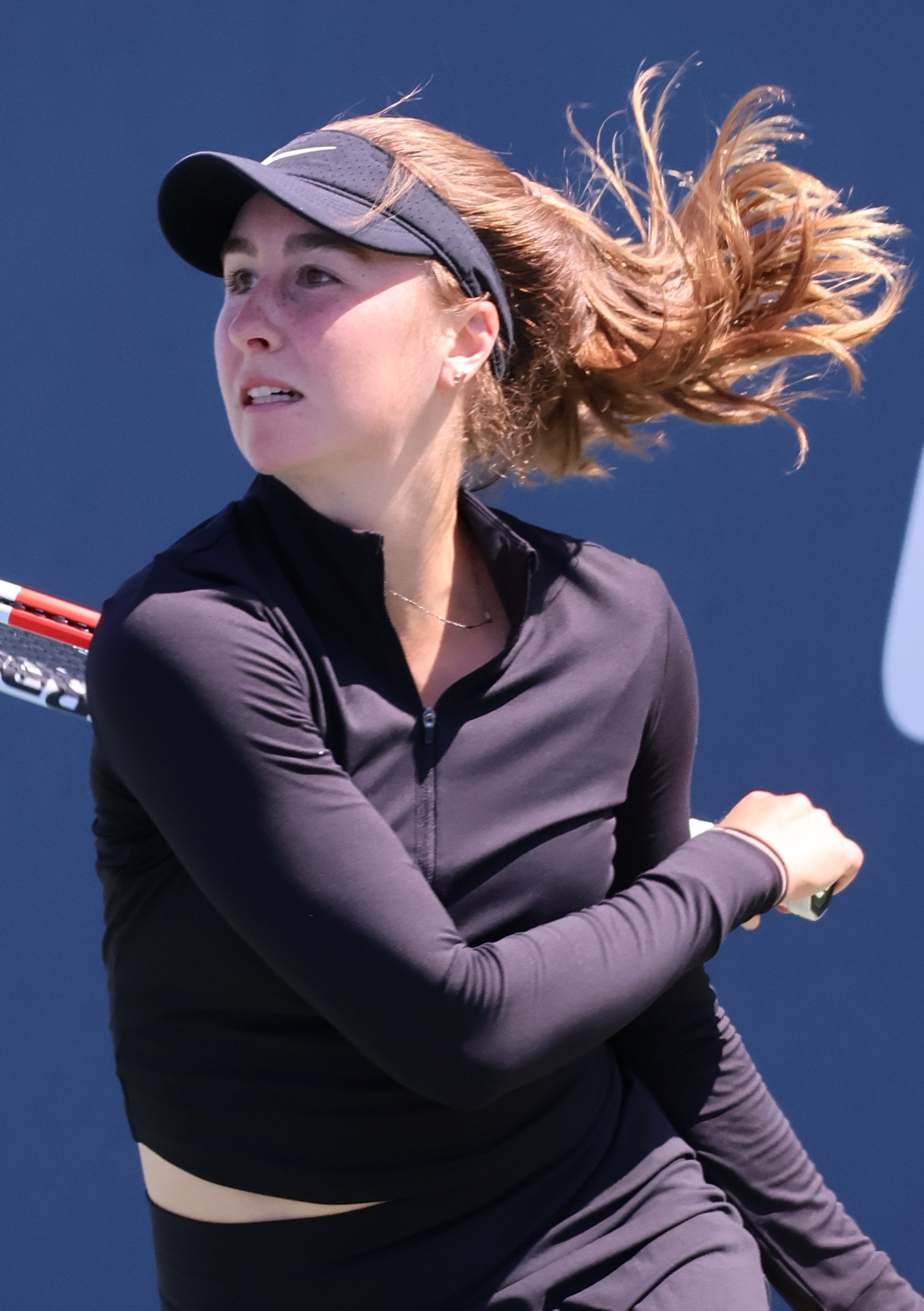
- Beck at the 2023 US Open
- Full name: Chloe Alexandra Beck
- Country (sports): United States
- Born: August 30, 2001 (age 24) Athens, Georgia
- Height: 1.70 m (5 ft 7 in)
- Plays: Right-handed
- College: Duke University
- Coach: Mike Beck
- Prize money: $45,049

Singles
- Career record: 35–23
- Highest ranking: No. 385 (November 23, 2023)
- Current ranking: No. 453 (July 15, 2024)

Grand Slam singles results
- US Open: Q1 (2023)
- Australian Open Junior: 1R (2019)
- French Open Junior: 1R (2018, 2019)
- Wimbledon Junior: 1R (2018, 2019)

Doubles
- Career record: 18–21
- Career titles: 1 ITF
- Highest ranking: No. 400 (April 8, 2019)
- Current ranking: No. 517 (July 15, 2024)

Grand Slam doubles results
- Australian Open Junior: F (2019)
- French Open Junior: W (2019)
- Wimbledon Junior: QF (2019)
- US Open Junior: SF (2018)
- Last updated on: July 15, 2024.

Chloe Alexandra Beck (born August 30, 2001) is an American tennis player.

Beck won the junior doubles tournament of the 2019 French Open with Emma Navarro, and they also finished runners-up in the 2019 Australian Open. Beck has reached a career-high singles ranking of 385 by the WTA and a best doubles ranking of 400.

She played college tennis at Duke University, where she was ranked as high as No. 2 nationally by the Intercollegiate Tennis Association.

Beck made her WTA Tour debut at the 2019 Charleston Open, partnering with Emma Navarro, after the pair received a wildcard into the main draw of the doubles tournament.

== ITF Circuit finals ==
=== Singles: 1 (runner–up) ===
| Legend $25,000 tournaments | Finals by surface Hard (0–1) |

| Result | W–L | Date | Tournament | Tier | Surface | Opponent | Score |
|---|---|---|---|---|---|---|---|
| Loss | 0–1 | Oct 2023 | ITF Florence, United States | 25,000 | Hard | (United States) Fiona Crawley | 5-7, 1–6 |

=== Doubles: 1 (title) ===
| Legend $15,000 tournaments | Finals by surface Clay (1–0) |

| Result | W–L | Date | Tournament | Tier | Surface | Partner | Opponents | Score |
|---|---|---|---|---|---|---|---|---|
| Win | 1–0 | Sep 2017 | ITF Charleston, United States | 15,000 | Clay | (United States) Emma Navarro | (Russia) Ksenia Kuznetsova (Spain) Maria Martinez Martinez | 6–1, 6–4 |

== Junior Grand Slam finals ==
=== Girls' doubles ===
| Result | Year | Championship | Surface | Partner | Opponents | Score |
|---|---|---|---|---|---|---|
| Loss | 2019 | Australian Open | Hard | (United States) Emma Navarro | (Hungary) Adrienn Nagy (Japan) Natsumi Kawaguchi | 4–6, 4–6 |
| Win | 2019 | French Open | Clay | (United States) Emma Navarro | (Russia) Alina Charaeva (Russia) Anastasia Tikhonova | 6–1, 6–2 |
