= 2019 French Open – Girls' singles =

Girls' singles
- 2019 French Open

Final
- Champion: (Canada) Leylah Fernandez
- Runner-up: (United States) Emma Navarro
- Score: 6–3, 6–2

Events
Singles	men	women		boys	girls
Doubles	men	women	mixed	boys	girls
WC Singles	men	women	quad
WC Doubles	men	women	quad
Legends	−45	45+	women
← 2018 ·	French Open	· 2020 →

Leylah Fernandez won the girls' singles tennis title at the 2019 French Open, defeating Emma Navarro in the final, 6–3, 6–2.

Cori Gauff was the defending champion, but received a wildcard into the women's singles qualifying competition, losing to Kaja Juvan in the second round.

== Seeds ==
1. (Canada) Leylah Annie Fernandez (champion)
2. (France) Diane Parry (second round)
3. (Colombia) Camila Osorio (semifinals)
4. (United States) Alexa Noel (second round)
5. (China) Zheng Qinwen (semifinals)
6. (United States) Hurricane Tyra Black (second round)
7. (Japan) Natsumi Kawaguchi (third round)
8. (United States) Emma Navarro (final)

9. (Latvia) Kamilla Bartone (third round)
10. (Chinese Taipei) Joanna Garland (third round)
11. (Russia) Alina Charaeva (quarterfinals)
12. (Burundi) Sada Nahimana (first round)
13. (Russia) Anastasia Tikhonova (first round)
14. (United States) Elizabeth Mandlik (first round)
15. (South Korea) Park So-hyun (third round)
16. (Malta) Helene Pellicano (second round)

== Draw ==
=== Key ===
- Q = Qualifier
- WC = Wild card
- LL = Lucky loser
- Alt = Alternate
- SE = Special exempt
- PR = Protected ranking
- ITF = ITF entry
- JE = Junior exempt
- w/o = Walkover
- r = Retired
- d = Defaulted
- SR = Special ranking

=== Finals ===
Quarterfinals
1	(Canada) Leylah Fernandez	6	6
(France) Elsa Jacquemot	0	0
3	(Colombia) Camila Osorio	6	6
11	(Russia) Alina Charaeva	3	3
5	(China) Zheng Qinwen	2	6	6
LL	(Sweden) Caijsa Hennemann	6	3	3
8	(United States) Emma Navarro	6^{6}	6	6
(Ukraine) Daria Snigur	7^{8}	3	2

Semifinals
1	(Canada) Leylah Fernandez	6	6
3	(Colombia) Camila Osorio	2	4
5	(China) Zheng Qinwen	6	1	4
8	(United States) Emma Navarro	2	6	6

Final
1	(Canada) Leylah Fernandez	6	6
8	(United States) Emma Navarro	3	2

=== Top half ===
==== Section 1 ====
First round
1	(Canada) Leylah Fernandez	7	6
(Russia) Mariia Tkacheva	5	3
(Latvia) Darja Semenistaja	6	4	3
(Spain) Marta Custic	3	6	6
WC	(France) Lucie Nguyen Tan	6	6
WC	(China) Tian Fangran	3	4
(United States) Savannah Broadus	4	6	2
15	(South Korea) Park So-hyun	6	1	6
12	(Burundi) Sada Nahimana	3	0
Q	(United States) Charlotte Chavatipon	6	6
(France) Elsa Jacquemot	6	6
(Slovenia) Pia Lovrič	3	0
(Russia) Taisya Pachkaleva	6	3
Q	(Italy) Federica Rossi	3	0^{r}
WC	(France) Alice Tubello	6	6^{6}	0
6	(United States) Hurricane Tyra Black	3	7^{8}	6

Second round
1	(Canada) LA Fernandez	6	6
(Spain) M Custic	0	3
WC	(France) L Nguyen Tan	3	4
15	(South Korea) S-h Park	6	6
Q	(United States) C Chavatipon	6^{4}	6	3
(France) E Jacquemot	7^{7}	1	6
(Russia) T Pachkaleva	6	6
6	(United States) HT Black	2	3

Third round
1	(Canada) LA Fernandez	6	6
15	(South Korea) S-h Park	2	0
(France) E Jacquemot	6	6
(Russia) T Pachkaleva	4	0

Quarterfinals
1	(Canada) LA Fernandez	6	6
(France) E Jacquemot	0	0

==== Section 2 ====
First round
3	(Colombia) Camila Osorio	6	6
Q	(Argentina) Ana Geller	3	1
(Hong Kong) Cody Wong Hong-yi	6	6
(Ukraine) Liubov Kostenko	3	3
(Russia) Elina Avanesyan	7	6
WC	(France) Giulia Morlet	5	3
(Slovakia) Romana Čisovská	6	6
14	(United States) Elizabeth Mandlik	2	3
11	(Russia) Alina Charaeva	6	6
WC	(France) Célia-Belle Mohr	4	4
(Indonesia) Priska Madelyn Nugroho	7	7^{7}
(Spain) Carlota Martínez Círez	5	6^{3}
(China) Bai Zhuoxuan	3	5
(France) Mylène Halemai	6	7
(United States) Abigail Forbes	3	7	3
7	(Japan) Natsumi Kawaguchi	6	5	6

Second round
3	(Colombia) C Osorio	6	3	6
(Hong Kong) CH-y Wong	4	6	1
(Russia) E Avanesyan	6	2	1
(Slovakia) R Čisovská	3	6	6
11	(Russia) A Charaeva	7	4	6
(Indonesia) PM Nugroho	5	6	4
(France) M Halemai	4	3
7	(Japan) N Kawaguchi	6	6

Third round
3	(Colombia) C Osorio	6	7
(Slovakia) R Čisovská	3	5
11	(Russia) A Charaeva	6	6
7	(Japan) N Kawaguchi	3	2

Quarterfinals
3	(Colombia) C Osorio	6	6
11	(Russia) A Charaeva	3	3

=== Bottom half ===
==== Section 3 ====
First round
5	(China) Zheng Qinwen	6	6
(Israel) Shavit Kimchi	1	4
Q	(United States) Chloe Beck	4	4
(France) Loudmilla Bencheikh	6	6
Q	(Russia) Diana Shnaider	3	6	6
(Switzerland) Valentina Ryser	6	3	1
WC	(France) Manon Léonard	6	3	4
10	(Chinese Taipei) Joanna Garland	3	6	6
13	(Russia) Anastasia Tikhonova	4	2
LL	(Sweden) Caijsa Hennemann	6	6
WC	(France) Julie Belgraver	2	7	2
Q	(Italy) Melania Delai	6	5	6
Q	(Ukraine) Viktoriya Petrenko	2	1
(Spain) Ane Mintegi del Olmo	6	6
SE	(France) Carole Monnet	5	4
4	(United States) Alexa Noel	7	6

Second round
5	(China) Q Zheng	6	7^{7}
(France) L Bencheikh	0	6^{4}
Q	(Russia) D Shnaider	6	6^{7}	2
10	(Chinese Taipei) J Garland	1	7^{9}	6
LL	(Sweden) C Hennemann	6	6
Q	(Italy) M Delai	4	2
(Spain) A Mintegi del Olmo	6	6
4	(United States) A Noel	4	1

Third round
5	(China) Q Zheng	6	6
10	(Chinese Taipei) J Garland	3	4
LL	(Sweden) C Hennemann	1	7	6
(Spain) A Mintegi del Olmo	6	5	2

Quarterfinals
5	(China) Q Zheng	2	6	6
LL	(Sweden) C Hennemann	6	3	3

==== Section 4 ====
First round
8	(United States) Emma Navarro	6	6
(Hungary) Adrienn Nagy	3	4
(Czech Republic) Linda Fruhvirtová	4	5
WC	(France) Aubane Droguet	6	7
(France) Séléna Janicijevic	1	2
(Russia) Oksana Selekhmeteva	6	6
(United States) Robin Montgomery	7^{9}	4	4
9	(Latvia) Kamilla Bartone	6^{7}	6	6
16	(Malta) Helene Pellicano	6	3
(United States) Lea Ma	3	1^{r}
Q	(Germany) Alexandra Vecic	2	5
(Ukraine) Daria Snigur	6	7
(Australia) Annerly Poulos	4	6	7
(Colombia) Antonia Samudio	6	0	5
(Russia) Daria Frayman	2	2
2	(France) Diane Parry	6	6

Second round
8	(United States) E Navarro	6	6
WC	(France) A Droguet	1	3
(Russia) O Selekhmeteva	4	3
9	(Latvia) K Bartone	6	6
16	(Malta) H Pellicano	6	3	1
(Ukraine) D Snigur	1	6	6
(Australia) A Poulos	6	6
2	(France) D Parry	3	4

Third round
8	(United States) E Navarro	6	6
9	(Latvia) K Bartone	4	4
(Ukraine) D Snigur	6	6
(Australia) A Poulos	4	3

Quarterfinals
8	(United States) E Navarro	6^{6}	6	6
(Ukraine) D Snigur	7^{8}	3	2

== Qualifying ==
=== Seeds ===
1. (Ecuador) Mell Reasco (first round)
2. (Russia) Diana Shnaider (qualified)
3. (Germany) Alexandra Vecic (qualified)
4. (Canada) Mélodie Collard (first round)
5. (United States) Chloe Beck (qualified)
6. (Sweden) Caijsa Hennemann (qualifying competition; lucky loser)
7. (United States) Charlotte Chavatipon (qualified)
8. (Brazil) Ana Luiza Cruz (first round)
9. (Peru) Dana Guzmán (first round)
10. (Hungary) Amarissa Kiara Tóth (qualifying competition, retired)
11. (Italy) Sara Ziodato (first round)
12. (Japan) Funa Kozaki (qualifying competition)
13. (Russia) Maria Timofeeva (qualifying competition)
14. (Italy) Federica Rossi (qualified)
15. (Italy) Melania Delai (qualified)
16. (Czech Republic) Michaela Kadlečková (first round)

=== Qualifiers ===
1. (Ukraine) Viktoriya Petrenko
2. (Russia) Diana Shnaider
3. (Germany) Alexandra Vecic
4. (Argentina) Ana Geller
5. (United States) Chloe Beck
6. (Italy) Federica Rossi
7. (United States) Charlotte Chavatipon
8. (Italy) Melania Delai

=== Lucky loser ===
1. (Sweden) Caijsa Hennemann

=== Draw ===
==== First qualifier ====
First round
1	(Ecuador) Mell Reasco	2	4
(Ukraine) Viktoriya Petrenko	6	6
WC	(France) Océane Babel	6	7
11	(Italy) Sara Ziodato	4	5

Qualifying competition
(Ukraine) Viktoriya Petrenko	6	6
WC	(France) Océane Babel	1	2

==== Second qualifier ====
First round
2	(Russia) Diana Shnaider	6	6
WC	(France) Anaëlle Leclercq	0	1
(United States) Charlotte Owensby	3	3
12	(Japan) Funa Kozaki	6	6

Qualifying competition
2	(Russia) Diana Shnaider	7^{7}	6
12	(Japan) Funa Kozaki	6^{3}	4

==== Third qualifier ====
First round
3	(Germany) Alexandra Vecic	6	6
(Georgia (country)) Zoziya Kardava	0	1
WC	(France) Maélie Monfils	1	3
10	(Hungary) Amarissa Kiara Tóth	6	6

Qualifying competition
3	(Germany) Alexandra Vecic	6	4
10	(Hungary) Amarissa Kiara Tóth	4	5^{r}

==== Fourth qualifier ====
First round
4	(Canada) Mélodie Collard	0	6	6^{6}
(Argentina) Ana Geller	6	2	7^{8}
(Italy) Lisa Pigato	6	6
9	(Peru) Dana Guzmán	4	1

Qualifying competition
(Argentina) Ana Geller	6	6
(Italy) Lisa Pigato	3	4

==== Fifth qualifier ====
First round
5	(United States) Chloe Beck	6	6
(Poland) Weronika Baszak	3	3
WC	(France) Jade Psonka	2	1
13	(Russia) Maria Timofeeva	6	6

Qualifying competition
5	(United States) Chloe Beck	2	7	6
13	(Russia) Maria Timofeeva	6	5	0

==== Sixth qualifier ====
First round
6	(Sweden) Caijsa Hennemann	7	6
WC	(France) Juline Fayard	5	3
(China) Wang Jiaqi	2	6	2
14	(Italy) Federica Rossi	6	2	6

Qualifying competition
6	(Sweden) Caijsa Hennemann	5	6	3
14	(Italy) Federica Rossi	7	4	6

==== Seventh qualifier ====
First round
7	(United States) Charlotte Chavatipon	7^{7}	6^{5}	6
(Italy) Martina Biagianti	6^{3}	7^{7}	4
(Puerto Rico) Lauren Anzalotta Kynoch	6	6
16	(Czech Republic) Michaela Kadlečková	2	3

Qualifying competition
7	(United States) Charlotte Chavatipon	6	6
(Puerto Rico) Lauren Anzalotta Kynoch	1	4

==== Eighth qualifier ====
First round
8	(Brazil) Ana Luiza Cruz	5	2
(Bulgaria) Daniella Dimitrova	7	6
WC	(France) Maëlle Leclercq	1	2
15	(Italy) Melania Delai	6	6

Qualifying competition
(Bulgaria) Daniella Dimitrova	3	0
15	(Italy) Melania Delai	6	6
