= 2019 French Open – Girls' doubles =

Girls' doubles
- 2019 French Open

Final
- Champions: (United States) Chloe Beck (United States) Emma Navarro
- Runners-up: (Russia) Alina Charaeva (Russia) Anastasia Tikhonova
- Score: 6–1, 6–2

Events
| Singles | men | women | | boys | girls |
| Doubles | men | women | mixed | boys | girls |
| WC Singles | men | women | quad |
| WC Doubles | men | women | quad |
| Legends | −45 | 45+ | women |
| ← 2018 · | French Open | · 2020 → |

Chloe Beck and Emma Navarro won the girls' doubles tennis title at the 2019 French Open, defeating Alina Charaeva and Anastasia Tikhonova in the final, 6–1, 6–2.

Caty McNally and Iga Świątek were the defending champions, but chose not to participate.

== Seeds ==
1. (Japan) Natsumi Kawaguchi / (France) Diane Parry (semifinals)
2. (Chinese Taipei) Joanna Garland / (Colombia) Camila Osorio (second round, retired)
3. (United States) Elizabeth Mandlik / (United States) Alexa Noel (first round)
4. (Russia) Alina Charaeva / (Russia) Anastasia Tikhonova (final)
5. (United States) Hurricane Tyra Black / (United States) Lea Ma (quarterfinals)
6. (Latvia) Kamilla Bartone / (Russia) Oksana Selekhmeteva (quarterfinals)
7. (Hungary) Adrienn Nagy / (South Korea) Park So-hyun (semifinals)
8. (Canada) Mélodie Collard / (Canada) Leylah Annie Fernandez (second round)

== Draw ==
=== Key ===
- Q = Qualifier
- WC = Wild card
- LL = Lucky loser
- Alt = Alternate
- SE = Special exempt
- PR = Protected ranking
- ITF = ITF entry
- JE = Junior exempt
- w/o = Walkover
- r = Retired
- d = Defaulted
- SR = Special ranking

=== Finals ===
Semifinals
1 | (Japan) Natsumi Kawaguchi (France) Diane Parry | 3 | 6 | [9]
4 | (Russia) Alina Charaeva (Russia) Anastasia Tikhonova | 6 | 1 | [11]
(United States) Chloe Beck (United States) Emma Navarro | 6 | 3 | [17]
7 | (Hungary) Adrienn Nagy (South Korea) Park So-hyun | 3 | 6 | [15]

Final
4 | (Russia) Alina Charaeva (Russia) Anastasia Tikhonova | 1 | 2
(United States) Chloe Beck (United States) Emma Navarro | 6 | 6

=== Top half ===
First round
1 | (Japan) Natsumi Kawaguchi (France) Diane Parry | 6 | 6
Alt | (Ukraine) Viktoriya Petrenko (Russia) Maria Timofeeva | 2 | 3
(Slovenia) Pia Lovrič (Latvia) Darja Semenistaja | 3 | 0
(Italy) Melania Delai (Spain) Ane Mintegi del Olmo | 6 | 6
(Spain) Carlota Martínez Círez (Colombia) Antonia Samudio | 6 | 6
(Argentina) Ana Geller (France) Carole Monnet | 4 | 0
WC | (France) Océane Babel (France) Célia-Belle Mohr | 3 | 3
5 | (United States) Hurricane Tyra Black (United States) Lea Ma | 6 | 6
4 | (Russia) Alina Charaeva (Russia) Anastasia Tikhonova | 6 | 6
(Puerto Rico) Lauren Anzalotta Kynoch (Sweden) Caijsa Hennemann | 1 | 3
(Ukraine) Liubov Kostenko (France) Giulia Morlet | 6 | 7
WC | (France) Juline Fayard (France) Lucie Nguyen Tan | 2 | 5
(Indonesia) Priska Madelyn Nugroho (Switzerland) Valentina Ryser | 5 | 6 | [2]
(United States) Savannah Broadus (United States) Abigail Forbes | 7 | 4 | [10]
(France) Aubane Droguet (France) Séléna Janicijevic | 3 | 2
6 | (Latvia) Kamilla Bartone (Russia) Oksana Selekhmeteva | 6 | 6

Second round
1 | (Japan) N Kawaguchi (France) D Parry | 6 | 6
(Italy) M Delai (Spain) A Mintegi del Olmo | 1 | 1
(Spain) C Martínez Círez (Colombia) A Samudio | 6^{8} | 2
5 | (United States) HT Black (United States) L Ma | 7^{10} | 6
4 | (Russia) A Charaeva (Russia) A Tikhonova | 6 | 6
(Ukraine) L Kostenko (France) G Morlet | 2 | 4
(United States) S Broadus (United States) A Forbes | 4 | 3
6 | (Latvia) K Bartone (Russia) O Selekhmeteva | 6 | 6

Quarterfinals
1 | (Japan) N Kawaguchi (France) D Parry | 6 | 6
5 | (United States) HT Black (United States) L Ma | 4 | 2
4 | (Russia) A Charaeva (Russia) A Tikhonova | 4 | 6 | [10]
6 | (Latvia) K Bartone (Russia) O Selekhmeteva | 6 | 4 | [7]

Semifinals
1 | (Japan) N Kawaguchi (France) D Parry | 3 | 6 | [9]
4 | (Russia) A Charaeva (Russia) A Tikhonova | 6 | 1 | [11]

=== Bottom half ===
First round
8 | (Canada) Mélodie Collard (Canada) Leylah Annie Fernandez | 6 | 7
(China) Bai Zhuoxuan (Australia) Annerly Poulos | 3 | 5
WC | (France) Elsa Jacquemot (France) Manon Léonard | 2 | 5
(United States) Chloe Beck (United States) Emma Navarro | 6 | 7
(Russia) Daria Frayman (Russia) Mariia Tkacheva | 5 | 2
(Slovakia) Romana Čisovská (Israel) Shavit Kimchi | 7 | 6
(Russia) Taisya Pachkaleva (China) Zheng Qinwen | 6 | 6
3 | (United States) Elizabeth Mandlik (United States) Alexa Noel | 4 | 3
7 | (Hungary) Adrienn Nagy (South Korea) Park So-hyun | 4 | 6 | [10]
(Spain) Marta Custic (Malta) Helene Pellicano | 6 | 3 | [8]
(Russia) Elina Avanesyan (Russia) Diana Shnaider | 6 | 4 | [10]
WC | (France) Julie Belgraver (France) Mylène Halemai | 1 | 6 | [6]
(Burundi) Sada Nahimana (Hong Kong) Cody Wong Hong-yi | 6 | 3 | [15]
(United States) Charlotte Chavatipon (United States) Charlotte Owensby | 1 | 6 | [13]
(Czech Republic) Linda Fruhvirtová (United States) Robin Montgomery | 5 | 6 | [6]
2 | (Chinese Taipei) Joanna Garland (Colombia) Camila Osorio | 7 | 0 | [10]

Second round
8 | (Canada) M Collard (Canada) LA Fernandez | 0 | 6^{8}
(United States) C Beck (United States) E Navarro | 6 | 7^{10}
(Slovakia) R Čisovská (Israel) S Kimchi | 3 | 6^{8}
(Russia) T Pachkaleva (China) Q Zheng | 6 | 7^{10}
7 | (Hungary) A Nagy (South Korea) S-h Park | 4 | 6 | [10]
(Russia) E Avanesyan (Russia) D Shnaider | 6 | 4 | [6]
(Burundi) S Nahimana (Hong Kong) CH-y Wong | 7 | 0
2 | (Chinese Taipei) J Garland (Colombia) C Osorio | 5 | 0^{r}

Quarterfinals
(United States) C Beck (United States) E Navarro | 6 | 6
(Russia) T Pachkaleva (China) Q Zheng | 4 | 4
7 | (Hungary) A Nagy (South Korea) S-h Park | 6 | 6
(Burundi) S Nahimana (Hong Kong) CH-y Wong | 4 | 4

Semifinals
(United States) C Beck (United States) E Navarro | 6 | 3 | [17]
7 | (Hungary) A Nagy (South Korea) S-h Park | 3 | 6 | [15]
