= 2019 French Open – Wheelchair women's singles =

Wheelchair women's singles
- 2019 French Open

Final
- Champion: (Netherlands) Diede de Groot
- Runner-up: (Japan) Yui Kamiji
- Score: 6–1, 6–0

Events
Singles	men	women		boys	girls
Doubles	men	women	mixed	boys	girls
WC Singles	men	women	quad
WC Doubles	men	women	quad
Legends	−45	45+	women
- French Open

Diede de Groot defeated the two-time defending champion Yui Kamiji in the final, 6–1, 6–0 to win the women's singles wheelchair tennis title at the 2019 French Open. With the win, de Groot completed a non-calendar-year Grand Slam and the career Grand Slam, becoming the first wheelchair tennis player to do each in singles.

== Seeds ==
1. (Netherlands) Diede de Groot (champion)
2. (Japan) Yui Kamiji (final)

== Draw ==
Key

- Q = Qualifier
- WC = Wild card
- LL = Lucky loser
- Alt = Alternate
- ITF = ITF entry
- PR = Protected ranking
- SR = Special ranking
- SE = Special exempt
- JE = Junior exempt
- JR = Junior Accelerator Programme entrant
- CO = College Accelerator Programme entrant
- NG = Next Gen Accelerator Program entrant
- w/o = Walkover
- r = Retired
- d = Defaulted

=== Finals ===
Quarterfinals
1	(Netherlands) Diede de Groot	6	6
(South Africa) Kgothatso Montjane	1	0
(Netherlands) Aniek van Koot	6	6
(Germany) Sabine Ellerbrock	1	1
WC	(France) Charlotte Famin	1	0
(Netherlands) Marjolein Buis	6	6
(Italy) Giulia Capocci	4	2
2	(Japan) Yui Kamiji	6	6

Semifinals
1	(Netherlands) Diede de Groot	6	6^{5}	6
(Netherlands) Aniek van Koot	4	7^{7}	4
(Netherlands) Marjolein Buis	4	5
2	(Japan) Yui Kamiji	6	7

Final
1	(Netherlands) Diede de Groot	6	6
2	(Japan) Yui Kamiji	1	0
