= 2019 French Open – Boys' doubles =

Boys' doubles
- 2019 French Open

Final
- Champions: (Brazil) Matheus Pucinelli de Almeida (Argentina) Thiago Agustín Tirante
- Runners-up: (Italy) Flavio Cobolli (Switzerland) Dominic Stricker
- Score: 7–6^{(7–3)}, 6–4

Events
Singles	men	women		boys	girls
Doubles	men	women	mixed	boys	girls
WC Singles	men	women	quad
WC Doubles	men	women	quad
Legends	−45	45+	women
← 2018 ·	French Open	· 2020 →

Matheus Pucinelli de Almeida and Thiago Agustín Tirante won the boys' doubles tennis title at the 2019 French Open, defeating Flavio Cobolli and Dominic Stricker in the final, 7–6^{(7–3)}, 6–4.

Ondřej Štyler and Naoki Tajima were the defending champions, but both players were no longer eligible to participate in junior tournaments.

== Seeds ==
1. (Italy) Lorenzo Musetti / (Italy) Giulio Zeppieri (withdrew)
2. (United States) Cannon Kingsley / (United States) Emilio Nava (second round)
3. (Australia) Rinky Hijikata / (Romania) Filip Cristian Jianu (first round)
4. (United States) Zane Khan / (China) Bu Yunchaokete (quarterfinals)
5. (Brazil) Matheus Pucinelli de Almeida / (Argentina) Thiago Agustín Tirante (champions)
6. (Japan) Shunsuke Mitsui / (Japan) Keisuke Saitoh (first round)
7. (Canada) Liam Draxl / (United States) Govind Nanda (first round)
8. (Uzbekistan) Sergey Fomin / (Belgium) Gauthier Onclin (semifinals)

== Draw ==
Key

- Q = Qualifier
- WC = Wild card
- LL = Lucky loser
- Alt = Alternate
- ITF = ITF entry
- PR = Protected ranking
- SR = Special ranking
- SE = Special exempt
- JE = Junior exempt
- JR = Junior Accelerator Programme entrant
- CO = College Accelerator Programme entrant
- NG = Next Gen Accelerator Program entrant
- w/o = Walkover
- r = Retired
- d = Defaulted

=== Finals ===
Semifinals
(Czech Republic) Andrew Paulson (Ukraine) Eric Vanshelboim	1	0
5	(Brazil) Matheus Pucinelli de Almeida (Argentina) Thiago Agustín Tirante	6	6
(Italy) Flavio Cobolli (Switzerland) Dominic Stricker	6	6
8	(Uzbekistan) Sergey Fomin (Belgium) Gauthier Onclin	3	1

Final
5	(Brazil) Matheus Pucinelli de Almeida (Argentina) Thiago Agustín Tirante	7^{7}	6
(Italy) Flavio Cobolli (Switzerland) Dominic Stricker	6^{3}	4

=== Top half ===
First round
Alt	(France) Sean Cuenin (France) Mehdi Sadaoui	3	3
(France) Arthur Cazaux (France) Harold Mayot	6	6
(United States) Eliot Spizzirri (United States) Tyler Zink	6	6
(Spain) Nicolás Álvarez Varona (Canada) Taha Baadi	3	1
(Ukraine) Illya Beloborodko (Sweden) Gustaf Ström	2	5
WC	(France) Baptiste Anselmo (France) Loris Pourroy	6	7
(Czech Republic) Andrew Paulson (Ukraine) Eric Vanshelboim	6	6
6	(Japan) Shunsuke Mitsui (Japan) Keisuke Saitoh	2	4
4	(United States) Zane Khan (China) Bu Yunchaokete	5	6	[10]
(Australia) Tristan Schoolkate (Australia) Dane Sweeny	7	2	[8]
(Japan) Shintaro Mochizuki (Denmark) Holger Rune	6	7^{7}
WC	(France) Pierre Delage (France) Giovanni Mpetshi Perricard	4	6^{5}
(Romania) Nini Gabriel Dica (Hungary) Péter Makk	2	5
(United States) Dali Blanch (Netherlands) Christian Lerby	6	7
(Bulgaria) Adrian Andreev (Netherlands) Lodewijk Weststrate	1	2
5	(Brazil) Matheus Pucinelli de Almeida (Argentina) Thiago Agustín Tirante	6	6

Second round
(France) A Cazaux (France) H Mayot	6	6^{4}	[12]
(United States) E Spizzirri (United States) T Zink	4	7^{7}	[10]
WC	(France) B Anselmo (France) L Pourroy	2	5
(Czech Republic) A Paulson (Ukraine) E Vanshelboim	6	7
4	(United States) Z Khan (China) Y Bu	6	2	[10]
(Japan) S Mochizuki (Denmark) HVN Rune	2	6	[7]
(United States) Dal Blanch (Netherlands) C Lerby	5	0
5	(Brazil) M Pucinelli de Almeida (Argentina) TA Tirante	7	6

Quarterfinals
(France) A Cazaux (France) H Mayot	7^{7}	4	[5]
(Czech Republic) A Paulson (Ukraine) E Vanshelboim	6^{5}	6	[10]
4	(United States) Z Khan (China) Y Bu	3	2
5	(Brazil) M Pucinelli de Almeida (Argentina) TA Tirante	6	6

Semifinals
(Czech Republic) A Paulson (Ukraine) E Vanshelboim	1	0
5	(Brazil) M Pucinelli de Almeida (Argentina) TA Tirante	6	6

=== Bottom half ===
First round
7	(Canada) Liam Draxl (United States) Govind Nanda	4	6	[8]
(United States) Martin Damm (United States) Toby Alex Kodat	6	1	[10]
(Argentina) Román Andrés Burruchaga (Argentina) Alejo Lorenzo Lingua Lavallén	6	4	[7]
(Italy) Matteo Arnaldi (Italy) Francesco Passaro	1	6	[10]
(Sweden) Kevin Chahoud (Algeria) Youcef Rihane	4	6	[12]
WC	(France) Kyrian Jacquet (France) Lilian Marmousez	6	3	[10]
(Italy) Flavio Cobolli (Switzerland) Dominic Stricker	7^{7}	6
3	(Australia) Rinky Hijikata (Romania) Filip Cristian Jianu	6^{4}	3
8	(Uzbekistan) Sergey Fomin (Belgium) Gauthier Onclin	6	6
(Russia) Alibek Kachmazov (Belarus) Alexander Zgirovsky	4	4
(Czech Republic) Jonáš Forejtek (Czech Republic) Dalibor Svrčina	3	4
(Brazil) Mateus Alves (United States) William Grant	6	6
(Finland) Otto Virtanen (United Kingdom) Harry Wendelken	0	6	[8]
(Spain) Pablo Llamas Ruiz (Argentina) Juan Bautista Torres	6	2	[10]
WC	(France) Martin Breysach (France) Timo Legout	3	3
2	(United States) Cannon Kingsley (United States) Emilio Nava	6	6

Second round
(United States) M Damm (United States) TA Kodat	6	6
(Italy) M Arnaldi (Italy) F Passaro	2	2
(Sweden) K Chahoud (Algeria) Y Rihane	2	0
(Italy) F Cobolli (Switzerland) D Stricker	6	6
8	(Uzbekistan) S Fomin (Belgium) G Onclin	6	6
(Brazil) M Alves (United States) W Grant	3	3
(Spain) P Llamas Ruiz (Argentina) JB Torres	6	2	[10]
2	(United States) C Kingsley (United States) E Nava	1	6	[4]

Quarterfinals
(United States) M Damm (United States) TA Kodat	4	4
(Italy) F Cobolli (Switzerland) D Stricker	6	6
8	(Uzbekistan) S Fomin (Belgium) G Onclin	7^{7}	6
(Spain) P Llamas Ruiz (Argentina) JB Torres	6^{0}	2

Semifinals
(Italy) F Cobolli (Switzerland) D Stricker	6	6
8	(Uzbekistan) S Fomin (Belgium) G Onclin	3	1
