= 2019 French Open – Wheelchair men's doubles =

Wheelchair men's doubles
- 2019 French Open

Final
- Champions: (Argentina) Gustavo Fernández (Japan) Shingo Kunieda
- Runners-up: (France) Stéphane Houdet (France) Nicolas Peifer
- Score: 2–6, 6–2, [10–8]

Events
Singles	men	women		boys	girls
Doubles	men	women	mixed	boys	girls
WC Singles	men	women	quad
WC Doubles	men	women	quad
Legends	−45	45+	women
- French Open

Gustavo Fernández and Shingo Kunieda defeated the two-time defending champions Stéphane Houdet and Nicolas Peifer in the final, 2–6, 6–2, [10–8] to win the men's doubles wheelchair tennis title at the 2019 French Open.

== Seeds ==
1. (France) Stephane Houdet / (France) Nicolas Peifer (final)
2. (United Kingdom) Alfie Hewett / (United Kingdom) Gordon Reid (semifinals)

== Draw ==
Key

- Q = Qualifier
- WC = Wild card
- LL = Lucky loser
- Alt = Alternate
- ITF = ITF entry
- PR = Protected ranking
- SR = Special ranking
- SE = Special exempt
- JE = Junior exempt
- JR = Junior Accelerator Programme entrant
- CO = College Accelerator Programme entrant
- NG = Next Gen Accelerator Program entrant
- w/o = Walkover
- r = Retired
- d = Defaulted

=== Finals ===
Semifinals
1	(France) Stéphane Houdet (France) Nicolas Peifer	6	6
(Belgium) Joachim Gérard (Sweden) Stefan Olsson	2	2
(Argentina) Gustavo Fernández (Japan) Shingo Kunieda	6	7
2	(United Kingdom) Alfie Hewett (United Kingdom) Gordon Reid	2	5

Final
1	(France) Stéphane Houdet (France) Nicolas Peifer	6	2	[8]
(Argentina) Gustavo Fernández (Japan) Shingo Kunieda	2	6	[10]
