= 2019 French Open – Wheelchair quad singles =

Wheelchair quad singles
- 2019 French Open

Final
- Champion: (Australia) Dylan Alcott
- Runner-up: (United States) David Wagner
- Score: 6–2, 4–6, 6–2

Events
Singles	men	women		boys	girls
Doubles	men	women	mixed	boys	girls
WC Singles	men	women	quad
WC Doubles	men	women	quad
Legends	−45	45+	women
- French Open

Dylan Alcott defeated David Wagner in the final, 6–2, 4–6, 6–2 to win the inaugural quad singles wheelchair tennis title at the 2019 French Open.

== Seeds ==
1. (Australia) Dylan Alcott (champion)
2. (United States) David Wagner (final)

== Draw ==
Key

- Q = Qualifier
- WC = Wild card
- LL = Lucky loser
- Alt = Alternate
- ITF = ITF entry
- PR = Protected ranking
- SR = Special ranking
- SE = Special exempt
- JE = Junior exempt
- JR = Junior Accelerator Programme entrant
- CO = College Accelerator Programme entrant
- NG = Next Gen Accelerator Program entrant
- w/o = Walkover
- r = Retired
- d = Defaulted

=== Finals ===
Semifinals
1	(Australia) Dylan Alcott	6	6
WC	(Brazil) Ymanitu Silva	1	2
(Japan) Koji Sugeno	4	0
2	(United States) David Wagner	6	6

Final
1	(Australia) Dylan Alcott	6	4	6
2	(United States) David Wagner	2	6	2
Third place match
WC	(Brazil) Ymanitu Silva	6	4	2
(Japan) Koji Sugeno	3	6	6
