= 2019 French Open – Wheelchair quad doubles =

Wheelchair quad doubles
- 2019 French Open

Final
- Champions: (Australia) Dylan Alcott (United States) David Wagner
- Runners-up: (Brazil) Ymanitu Silva (Japan) Koji Sugeno
- Score: 6–3, 6–3

Events
Singles	men	women		boys	girls
Doubles	men	women	mixed	boys	girls
WC Singles	men	women	quad
WC Doubles	men	women	quad
Legends	−45	45+	women
- French Open

Dylan Alcott and David Wagner defeated Ymanitu Silva and Koji Sugeno in the final, 6–3, 6–3 to win the inaugural quad doubles wheelchair tennis title at the 2019 French Open. It was the second step towards an eventual Grand Slam for Alcott.

== Draw ==
Key

- Q = Qualifier
- WC = Wild card
- LL = Lucky loser
- Alt = Alternate
- ITF = ITF entry
- PR = Protected ranking
- SR = Special ranking
- SE = Special exempt
- JE = Junior exempt
- JR = Junior Accelerator Programme entrant
- CO = College Accelerator Programme entrant
- NG = Next Gen Accelerator Program entrant
- w/o = Walkover
- r = Retired
- d = Defaulted

=== Finals ===
Final
(Australia) Dylan Alcott (United States) David Wagner	6	6
(Brazil) Ymanitu Silva (Japan) Koji Sugeno	3	3
