= 2019 French Open – Boys' singles =

Boys' singles
- 2019 French Open

Final
- Champion: (Denmark) Holger Rune
- Runner-up: (United States) Toby Kodat
- Score: 6–3, 6–7^{(5–7)}, 6–0

Events
Singles	men	women		boys	girls
Doubles	men	women	mixed	boys	girls
WC Singles	men	women	quad
WC Doubles	men	women	quad
Legends	−45	45+	women
← 2018 ·	French Open	· 2020 →

Holger Rune won the boys' singles tennis title at the 2019 French Open, defeating Toby Kodat in the final, 6–3, 6–7^{(5–7)}, 6–0.

Tseng Chun-hsin was the defending champion, but chose not to participate.

== Seeds ==
1. (Italy) Lorenzo Musetti (third round)
2. (Czech Republic) Jonáš Forejtek (third round)
3. (United States) Brandon Nakashima (third round)
4. (Bulgaria) Adrian Andreev (third round, retired)
5. (Argentina) Thiago Agustín Tirante (third round)
6. (United States) Emilio Nava (second round)
7. (Denmark) Holger Rune (champion)
8. (China) Bu Yunchaokete (second round)

9. (Finland) Otto Virtanen (first round)
10. (United States) Martin Damm (semifinals)
11. (Canada) Liam Draxl (first round)
12. (Italy) Giulio Zeppieri (second round, retired)
13. (Spain) Carlos Alcaraz (first round)
14. (Japan) Shunsuke Mitsui (first round)
15. (Romania) Filip Jianu (quarterfinals, retired)
16. (Australia) Rinky Hijikata (first round)

== Draw ==
Key

- Q = Qualifier
- WC = Wild card
- LL = Lucky loser
- Alt = Alternate
- ITF = ITF entry
- PR = Protected ranking
- SR = Special ranking
- SE = Special exempt
- JE = Junior exempt
- JR = Junior Accelerator Programme entrant
- CO = College Accelerator Programme entrant
- NG = Next Gen Accelerator Program entrant
- w/o = Walkover
- r = Retired
- d = Defaulted

=== Finals ===
Quarterfinals
Q	(Hungary) Péter Makk	1	4
10	(United States) Martin Damm	6	6
15	(Romania) Filip Jianu	0	1^{r}
7	(Denmark) Holger Rune	6	4
(Canada) Taha Baadi	6^{3}	2
(United States) Toby Kodat	7^{7}	6
(Japan) Shintaro Mochizuki	6	6
(Italy) Flavio Cobolli	1	2

Semifinals
10	(United States) Martin Damm	4	2
7	(Denmark) Holger Rune	6	6
(United States) Toby Kodat	6	6
(Japan) Shintaro Mochizuki	3	4

Final
7	(Denmark) Holger Rune	6	6^{5}	6
(United States) Toby Kodat	3	7^{7}	0

=== Top half ===
==== Section 1 ====
First round
1	(Italy) Lorenzo Musetti	7	6
WC	(France) Timo Legout	5	0
WC	(Brazil) Gustavo Heide	1	3
(Belgium) Gauthier Onclin	6	6
Q	(United States) William Grant	2	1
WC	(France) Nicolas Tepmahc	6	6
Q	(Hungary) Péter Makk	6	7
14	(Japan) Shunsuke Mitsui	1	5
10	(United States) Martin Damm	7	7^{7}
(Australia) Dane Sweeny	5	6^{1}
(Russia) Alibek Kachmazov	4	6	6
WC	(France) Giovanni Mpetshi Perricard	6	4	2
(Spain) Carlos Gimeno Valero	6	6
Q	(Netherlands) Christian Lerby	2	4
(United States) Cannon Kingsley	7^{7}	4	2
5	(Argentina) Thiago Agustín Tirante	6^{4}	6	6

Second round
1	(Italy) L Musetti	6	7^{7}
(Belgium) G Onclin	3	6^{1}
WC	(France) N Tepmahc	1	4
Q	(Hungary) P Makk	6	6
10	(United States) M Damm	6	6
(Russia) A Kachmazov	3	2
(Spain) C Gimeno Valero	2	4
5	(Argentina) TA Tirante	6	6

Third round
1	(Italy) L Musetti	6^{5}	6	5
Q	(Hungary) P Makk	7^{7}	4	7
10	(United States) M Damm	7^{7}	6
5	(Argentina) TA Tirante	6^{3}	1

Quarterfinals
Q	(Hungary) P Makk	1	4
10	(United States) M Damm	6	6

==== Section 2 ====
First round
3	(United States) Brandon Nakashima	6	6
(Sweden) Kevin Chahoud	1	2
(Ukraine) Eric Vanshelboim	6	1	6
WC	(France) Baptiste Anselmo	2	6	4
(Czech Republic) Dalibor Svrčina	5	4
Q	(Brazil) Mateus Alves	7	6
(Italy) Francesco Passaro	3	1
15	(Romania) Filip Jianu	6	6
11	(Canada) Liam Draxl	4	6	1
(France) Arthur Cazaux	6	3	6
(Spain) Nicolás Álvarez Varona	6^{8}	6	4
(Italy) Matteo Arnaldi	7^{10}	2	6
SE	(Argentina) Juan Bautista Torres	6^{6}	6	6
(United States) Zane Khan	7^{8}	4	4
WC	(France) Pierre Delage	4	2
7	(Denmark) Holger Rune	6	6

Second round
3	(United States) B Nakashima	6	6
(Ukraine) E Vanshelboim	1	4
Q	(Brazil) M Alves	4	4
15	(Romania) F Jianu	6	6
(France) A Cazaux	6	6
(Italy) M Arnaldi	2	3
SE	(Argentina) JB Torres	3	5
7	(Denmark) H Rune	6	7

Third round
3	(United States) B Nakashima	7^{7}	3	4
15	(Romania) F Jianu	6^{3}	6	6
(France) A Cazaux	4	3
7	(Denmark) H Rune	6	6

Quarterfinals
15	(Romania) F Jianu	0	1^{r}
7	(Denmark) H Rune	6	4

=== Bottom half ===
==== Section 3 ====
First round
6	(United States) Emilio Nava	6	6
(Algeria) Youcef Rihane	2	3
(Japan) Keisuke Saitoh	6	6
(Romania) Nini Gabriel Dica	2	0
(Canada) Taha Baadi	6^{5}	7^{7}	6
Q	(France) Lilian Marmousez	7^{7}	6^{2}	1
(Ukraine) Illya Beloborodko	2	2
12	(Italy) Giulio Zeppieri	6	6
13	(Spain) Carlos Alcaraz	4	4
(United States) Toby Kodat	6	6
Q	(Argentina) Alejo Lorenzo Lingua Lavallén	3	6	5
WC	(France) Kyrian Jacquet	6	3	7
Q	(United States) Dali Blanch	6	6
(Sweden) Gustaf Ström	0	1
(Switzerland) Dominic Stricker	3	6^{2}
4	(Bulgaria) Adrian Andreev	6	7^{7}

Second round
6	(United States) E Nava	1	4
(Japan) K Saitoh	6	6
(Canada) T Baadi	6^{6}	6	2
12	(Italy) G Zeppieri	7^{8}	0	4^{r}
(United States) T Kodat	6	6
WC	(France) K Jacquet	2	4
Q	(United States) Dal Blanch	3	3
4	(Bulgaria) A Andreev	6	6

Third round
(Japan) K Saitoh	6^{3}	2
(Canada) T Baadi	7^{7}	6
(United States) T Kodat	7^{7}	5
4	(Bulgaria) A Andreev	6^{5}	3^{r}

Quarterfinals
(Canada) T Baadi	6^{3}	2
(United States) T Kodat	7^{7}	6

==== Section 4 ====
First round
8	(China) Bu Yunchaokete	6	6
WC	(France) Martin Breysach	2	4
(Japan) Shintaro Mochizuki	6	2	7
(Uzbekistan) Sergey Fomin	4	6	5
(France) Harold Mayot	6	6
(United States) Govind Nanda	3	3
(Spain) Pablo Llamas Ruiz	3	6	6
9	(Finland) Otto Virtanen	6	0	3
16	(Australia) Rinky Hijikata	6	5	4
Q	(Argentina) Román Andrés Burruchaga	3	7	6
(Italy) Flavio Cobolli	7^{8}	6
(United States) Tyler Zink	6^{6}	2
(Brazil) Matheus Pucinelli de Almeida	6	6
(France) Valentin Royer	4	4
(United States) Eliot Spizzirri	6^{5}	6^{6}
2	(Czech Republic) Jonáš Forejtek	7^{7}	7^{8}

Second round
8	(China) Y Bu	2	1
(Japan) S Mochizuki	6	6
(France) H Mayot	2	4
(Spain) P Llamas Ruiz	6	6
Q	(Argentina) RA Burruchaga	7^{7}	2	1
(Italy) F Cobolli	6^{3}	6	6
(Brazil) M Pucinelli de Almeida	6^{4}	4
2	(Czech Republic) J Forejtek	7^{7}	6

Third round
(Japan) S Mochizuki	7	6
(Spain) P Llamas Ruiz	5	4
(Italy) F Cobolli	6	3	6
2	(Czech Republic) J Forejtek	4	6	2

Quarterfinals
(Japan) S Mochizuki	6	6
(Italy) F Cobolli	1	2

== Qualifying ==
=== Seeds ===
1. (Hungary) Péter Makk (qualified)
2. (Argentina) Alejo Lorenzo Lingua Lavallén (qualified)
3. (Australia) Tristan Schoolkate (qualifying competition)
4. (Romania) Nicholas David Ionel (qualifying competition)
5. (Netherlands) Stijn Pel (qualifying competition)
6. (United Kingdom) Harry Wendelken (first round)
7. (Vietnam) Nguyễn Văn Phương (first round)
8. (Belarus) Alexander Zgirovsky (qualifying competition)
9. (Argentina) Román Andrés Burruchaga (qualified)
10. (Ivory Coast) Eliakim Coulibaly (first round)
11. (United States) Dali Blanch (qualified)
12. (United States) William Grant (qualified)
13. (United Kingdom) Blu Baker (first round)
14. (Romania) Cezar Crețu (first round)
15. (United States) Jacob Bullard (first round)
16. (Czech Republic) Andrew Paulson (qualifying competition)

=== Qualifiers ===
1. (Hungary) Péter Makk
2. (Argentina) Alejo Lorenzo Lingua Lavallén
3. (United States) William Grant
4. (Brazil) Mateus Alves
5. (United States) Dali Blanch
6. (France) Lilian Marmousez
7. (Netherlands) Christian Lerby
8. (Argentina) Román Andrés Burruchaga

=== Draw ===
==== First qualifier ====
First round
1	(Hungary) Péter Makk	6	7^{8}
(France) Loris Pourroy	1	6^{6}
(United States) Andres Martin	4	4
16	(Czech Republic) Andrew Paulson	6	6

Qualifying competition
1	(Hungary) Péter Makk	5	7^{7}	6
16	(Czech Republic) Andrew Paulson	7	6^{1}	1

==== Second qualifier ====
First round
2	(Argentina) Alejo Lorenzo Lingua Lavallén	6	6
WC	(France) Luca Van Assche	4	4
(Netherlands) Lodewijk Weststrate	7	6
10	(Ivory Coast) Eliakim Coulibaly	5	2

Qualifying competition
2	(Argentina) Alejo Lorenzo Lingua Lavallén	7	6
(Netherlands) Lodewijk Weststrate	5	4

==== Third qualifier ====
First round
3	(Australia) Tristan Schoolkate	6	6
(Spain) Jaime Caldes	4	0
WC	(France) Younes Djouder	6^{5}	4
12	(United States) William Grant	7^{7}	6

Qualifying competition
3	(Australia) Tristan Schoolkate	4	6^{6}
12	(United States) William Grant	6	7^{8}

==== Fourth qualifier ====
First round
4	(Romania) Nicholas David Ionel	6	6
WC	(France) Tom Leblanc Claverie Cazassus	0	4
(Brazil) Mateus Alves	6	6
13	(United Kingdom) Blu Baker	1	3

Qualifying competition
4	(Romania) Nicholas David Ionel	6	4	4
(Brazil) Mateus Alves	4	6	6

==== Fifth qualifier ====
First round
5	(Netherlands) Stijn Pel	6	6
WC	(France) Thibault Verdier	4	3
(Germany) Justin Schlageter	3	1
11	(United States) Dali Blanch	6	6

Qualifying competition
5	(Netherlands) Stijn Pel	3	6	4
11	(United States) Dali Blanch	6	4	6

==== Sixth qualifier ====
First round
6	(United Kingdom) Harry Wendelken	2	6	2
(Latvia) Kārlis Ozoliņš	6	3	6
(France) Lilian Marmousez	6	6
14	(Romania) Cezar Crețu	0	4

Qualifying competition
(Latvia) Kārlis Ozoliņš	3	1
(France) Lilian Marmousez	6	6

==== Seventh qualifier ====
First round
7	(Vietnam) Nguyễn Văn Phương	7^{7}	3	0
(Netherlands) Christian Lerby	6^{2}	6	6
WC	(France) Mehdi Sadaoui	6	6
15	(United States) Jacob Bullard	1	3

Qualifying competition
(Netherlands) Christian Lerby	6	6
WC	(France) Mehdi Sadaoui	4	4

==== Eighth qualifier ====
First round
8	(Belarus) Alexander Zgirovsky	0	6	6
WC	(France) Sean Cuenin	6	1	2
(Brazil) Pedro Boscardin Dias	3	1
9	(Argentina) Román Andrés Burruchaga	6	6

Qualifying competition
8	(Belarus) Alexander Zgirovsky	7^{7}	2	6^{6}
9	(Argentina) Román Andrés Burruchaga	6^{5}	6	7^{8}
