= 2019 French Open – Wheelchair men's singles =

Wheelchair men's singles
- 2019 French Open

Final
- Champion: (Argentina) Gustavo Fernández
- Runner-up: (United Kingdom) Gordon Reid
- Score: 6–1, 6–3

Events
Singles	men	women		boys	girls
Doubles	men	women	mixed	boys	girls
WC Singles	men	women	quad
WC Doubles	men	women	quad
Legends	−45	45+	women
- French Open

Gustavo Fernández defeated Gordon Reid in the final, 6–1, 6–3 to win the men's singles wheelchair tennis title at the 2019 French Open. It was his second French Open singles title and fourth major singles title overall.

Shingo Kunieda was the defending champion, but was defeated by Reid in the semifinals.

== Seeds ==
1. (Japan) Shingo Kunieda (semifinals)
2. (Argentina) Gustavo Fernández (champion)

== Draw ==
Key

- Q = Qualifier
- WC = Wild card
- LL = Lucky loser
- Alt = Alternate
- ITF = ITF entry
- PR = Protected ranking
- SR = Special ranking
- SE = Special exempt
- JE = Junior exempt
- JR = Junior Accelerator Programme entrant
- CO = College Accelerator Programme entrant
- NG = Next Gen Accelerator Program entrant
- w/o = Walkover
- r = Retired
- d = Defaulted

=== Finals ===
Quarterfinals
1	(Japan) Shingo Kunieda	6	6
WC	(France) Nicolas Peifer	2	4
(United Kingdom) Gordon Reid	3	6	6
(Belgium) Joachim Gérard	6	4	3
(United Kingdom) Alfie Hewett	6	7^{7}
(France) Stéphane Houdet	2	6^{4}
(Sweden) Stefan Olsson	6	1	1
2	(Argentina) Gustavo Fernández	4	6	6

Semifinals
1	(Japan) Shingo Kunieda	6	6^{2}	2
(United Kingdom) Gordon Reid	2	7^{7}	6
(United Kingdom) Alfie Hewett	1	2
2	(Argentina) Gustavo Fernández	6	6

Final
(United Kingdom) Gordon Reid	1	3
2	(Argentina) Gustavo Fernández	6	6
