= 2019 French Open – Wheelchair women's doubles =

Wheelchair women's doubles
- 2019 French Open

Final
- Champions: (Netherlands) Diede de Groot (Netherlands) Aniek van Koot
- Runners-up: (Netherlands) Marjolein Buis (Germany) Sabine Ellerbrock
- Score: 6–1, 6–1

Events
Singles	men	women		boys	girls
Doubles	men	women	mixed	boys	girls
WC Singles	men	women	quad
WC Doubles	men	women	quad
Legends	−45	45+	women
- French Open

Defending champions Diede de Groot and Aniek van Koot defeated Marjolein Buis and Sabine Ellerbrock in the final, 6–1, 6–1 to win the women's doubles wheelchair tennis title at the 2019 French Open. It was their second step towards an eventual Grand Slam.

== Seeds ==
1. (Netherlands) Diede de Groot / (Netherlands) Aniek van Koot (champions)
2. (Netherlands) Marjolein Buis / (Germany) Sabine Ellerbrock (final)

== Draw ==
Key

- Q = Qualifier
- WC = Wild card
- LL = Lucky loser
- Alt = Alternate
- ITF = ITF entry
- PR = Protected ranking
- SR = Special ranking
- SE = Special exempt
- JE = Junior exempt
- JR = Junior Accelerator Programme entrant
- CO = College Accelerator Programme entrant
- NG = Next Gen Accelerator Program entrant
- w/o = Walkover
- r = Retired
- d = Defaulted

=== Finals ===
Semifinals
1	(Netherlands) Diede de Groot (Netherlands) Aniek van Koot	3	6	[10]
(Italy) Giulia Capocci (Japan) Yui Kamiji	6	4	[4]
(France) Charlotte Famin (South Africa) Kgothatso Montjane	3	4
2	(Netherlands) Marjolein Buis (Germany) Sabine Ellerbrock	6	6

Final
1	(Netherlands) Diede de Groot (Netherlands) Aniek van Koot	6	6
2	(Netherlands) Marjolein Buis (Germany) Sabine Ellerbrock	1	1
