= 2019 French Open – Legends over 45 doubles =

Legends over 45 doubles
- 2019 French Open

Final
- Champions: (Spain) Sergi Bruguera (Croatia) Goran Ivanišević
- Runners-up: (Sweden) Mikael Pernfors (Sweden) Mats Wilander
- Score: 6–2, 4–6, [10–4]

Events
| Singles | men | women | | boys | girls |
| Doubles | men | women | mixed | boys | girls |
| WC Singles | men | women | quad |
| WC Doubles | men | women | quad |
| Legends | −45 | 45+ | women |
| ← 2018 · | French Open | · 2020 → |

Mansour Bahrami and Fabrice Santoro were the defending champions, but were eliminated in the round robin competition.

Sergi Bruguera and Goran Ivanišević won the title, defeating Mikael Pernfors and Mats Wilander in the final, 6–2, 4–6, [10–4].

== Draw ==
=== Key ===
- Q = Qualifier
- WC = Wild card
- LL = Lucky loser
- Alt = Alternate
- ITF = ITF entry
- PR = Protected ranking
- SR = Special ranking
- SE = Special exempt
- JE = Junior exempt
- JR = Junior Accelerator Programme entrant
- CO = College Accelerator Programme entrant
- NG = Next Gen Accelerator Program entrant
- w/o = Walkover
- r = Retired
- d = Defaulted

=== Final ===
| Finals |
| C2 | (Spain) Sergi Bruguera (Croatia) Goran Ivanišević | 6 | 4 | [10] |
| D1 | (Sweden) Mikael Pernfors (Sweden) Mats Wilander | 2 | 6 | [4] |

=== Group C ===
| | | (France) M Bahrami (France) F Santoro | (Spain) S Bruguera (Croatia) G Ivanišević | (Australia) P Cash (France) H Leconte | RR; W–L | Set; W–L | Game; W–L | Standings |
| C1 | (France) Mansour Bahrami (France) Fabrice Santoro | | 6–4, 1–6, [8–10] | 6–4, 6–2 | 1–1 | 3–2 | 19–17 | 2 |
| C2 | (Spain) Sergi Bruguera (Croatia) Goran Ivanišević | 4–6, 6–1, [10–8] | | 7–5, 6–1 | 2–0 | 4–1 | 24–13 | 1 |
| C3 | (Australia) Pat Cash (France) Henri Leconte | 4–6, 2–6 | 5–7, 1–6 | | 0–2 | 0–4 | 12–25 | 3 |

Standings are determined by: 1. number of wins; 2. number of matches; 3. in three-players-ties, percentage of sets won, or of games won; 4. steering-committee decision.

=== Group D ===
| | | (Sweden) M Pernfors (Sweden) M Wilander | (United States) M Chang (United States) J McEnroe | (France) A Boetsch (Morocco) Y El Aynaoui (France) C Pioline | RR; W–L | Set; W–L | Game; W–L | Standings |
| D1 | (Sweden) Mikael Pernfors (Sweden) Mats Wilander | | 6–4, 7–5 | 6−7^{(5−7)}, 7−5, [10−8] (w/ Boetsch) | 2–0 | 4–1 | 27–21 | 1 |
| D2 | (United States) Michael Chang (United States) John McEnroe | 4–6, 5–7 | | 6–4, 7–5 (w/ El Aynaoui) | 1–1 | 2–2 | 22–22 | 2 |
| D3 | (France) Arnaud Boetsch (Morocco) Younes El Aynaoui (France) Cédric Pioline | 7−6^{(7−5)}, 5−7, [8−10] (w/ Boetsch) | 4–6, 5–7 (w/ El Aynaoui) | | 0−2 | 1−4 | 21−27 | 3 |

Standings are determined by: 1. number of wins; 2. number of matches; 3. in three-players-ties, percentage of sets won, or of games won; 4. steering-committee decision.
