= 2019 French Open – Legends under 45 doubles =

Legends under 45 doubles
- 2019 French Open

Final
- Champions: (France) Sébastien Grosjean (France) Michaël Llodra
- Runners-up: (Spain) Juan Carlos Ferrero (Ukraine) Andriy Medvedev
- Score: 7−6^{(7−4)}, 7−5

Events
Singles	men	women		boys	girls
Doubles	men	women	mixed	boys	girls
WC Singles	men	women	quad
WC Doubles	men	women	quad
Legends	−45	45+	women
← 2018 ·	French Open	· 2022 →

Àlex Corretja and Juan Carlos Ferrero were the defending champions, but Corretja chose not to participate this year. Ferrero played alongside Andriy Medvedev, but lost to Sébastien Grosjean and Michaël Llodra in the final, 6−7^{(4−7)}, 5−7.

== Draw ==
=== Key ===
- Q = Qualifier
- WC = Wild card
- LL = Lucky loser
- Alt = Alternate
- ITF = ITF entry
- PR = Protected ranking
- SR = Special ranking
- SE = Special exempt
- JE = Junior exempt
- JR = Junior Accelerator Programme entrant
- CO = College Accelerator Programme entrant
- NG = Next Gen Accelerator Program entrant
- w/o = Walkover
- r = Retired
- d = Defaulted

=== Final ===
Finals
A3	(Spain) Juan Carlos Ferrero (Ukraine) Andriy Medvedev	6^{4}	5
B1	(France) Sébastien Grosjean (France) Michaël Llodra	7^{7}	7

=== Group A ===
		(United States) J Blake (Australia) M Philippoussis	(France) A Clément (France) N Escudé	(Spain) JC Ferrero (Ukraine) A Medvedev	RR; W–L	Set; W–L	Game; W–L	Standings
A1	(United States) James Blake (Australia) Mark Philippoussis		6−3, 7−5	2–6, 5–7	1−1	2−2	20−21	2
A2	(France) Arnaud Clément (France) Nicolas Escudé	3−6, 5−7		3–6, 3–6	0−2	0−4	14−25	3
A3	(Spain) Juan Carlos Ferrero (Ukraine) Andriy Medvedev	6–2, 7–5	6–3, 6–3		2−0	4−0	25−13	1

Standings are determined by: 1. number of wins; 2. number of matches; 3. in three-players-ties, percentage of sets won, or of games won; 4. steering-committee decision.

=== Group B ===
		(France) S Grosjean (France) M Llodra	(Russia) Y Kafelnikov (Russia) M Safin	(Germany) T Haas (France) P-H Mathieu	RR; W–L	Set; W–L	Game; W–L	Standings
B1	(France) Sébastien Grosjean (France) Michaël Llodra		6–3, 5–7, [6–10]	6–4, 7–5	1–1	3–2	24–20	1
B2	(Russia) Yevgeny Kafelnikov (Russia) Marat Safin	3–6, 7–5, [10–6]		5–7, 3–6	1–1	2–3	19–24	3
B3	(Germany) Tommy Haas (France) Paul-Henri Mathieu	4–6, 5–7	7–5, 6–3		1–1	2–2	22–21	2

Standings are determined by: 1. number of wins; 2. number of matches; 3. in three-players-ties, percentage of sets won, or of games won; 4. steering-committee decision.
