= 2019 French Open – Mixed doubles =

Mixed doubles
- 2019 French Open

Final
- Champions: (Chinese Taipei) Latisha Chan (Croatia) Ivan Dodig
- Runners-up: (Canada) Gabriela Dabrowski (Croatia) Mate Pavić
- Score: 6–1, 7–6^{(7–5)}

Details
- Draw: 32
- Seeds: 8

Events
Singles	men	women		boys	girls
Doubles	men	women	mixed	boys	girls
WC Singles	men	women	quad
WC Doubles	men	women	quad
Legends	−45	45+	women
- French Open

Defending champions Latisha Chan and Ivan Dodig defeated Gabriela Dabrowski and Mate Pavić, 6–1, 7–6^{(7–5)} to win the mixed doubles tennis title at the 2019 French Open. The final was a rematch of the 2018 final, won by Chan and Dodig.

The pair becoming the first team in the Open era to win back-to-back French Open mixed doubles titles.

== Seeds ==
1. (United States) Nicole Melichar / (Brazil) Bruno Soares (semifinals)
2. (Canada) Gabriela Dabrowski / (Croatia) Mate Pavić (final)
3. (Czech Republic) Barbora Krejčíková / (United States) Rajeev Ram (withdrew)
4. (Netherlands) Demi Schuurs / (Netherlands) Jean-Julien Rojer (first round)
5. (China) Zhang Shuai / (Australia) John Peers (quarterfinals)
6. (Chinese Taipei) Chan Hao-ching / (Austria) Oliver Marach (quarterfinals)
7. (Poland) Alicja Rosolska / (Croatia) Nikola Mektić (quarterfinals)
8. (Germany) Anna-Lena Grönefeld / (Colombia) Robert Farah (second round)

== Draw ==
Key

- Q = Qualifier
- WC = Wild card
- LL = Lucky loser
- Alt = Alternate
- ITF = ITF entry
- PR = Protected ranking
- SR = Special ranking
- SE = Special exempt
- JE = Junior exempt
- JR = Junior Accelerator Programme entrant
- CO = College Accelerator Programme entrant
- NG = Next Gen Accelerator Program entrant
- w/o = Walkover
- r = Retired
- d = Defaulted

=== Finals ===
Semifinals
1	(United States) Nicole Melichar (Brazil) Bruno Soares	2	1
(Chinese Taipei) Latisha Chan (Croatia) Ivan Dodig	6	6
Alt	(Ukraine) Nadiia Kichenok (Pakistan) Aisam-ul-Haq Qureshi	7^{7}	1	[8]
2	(Canada) Gabriela Dabrowski (Croatia) Mate Pavić	6^{4}	6	[10]

Final
(Chinese Taipei) Latisha Chan (Croatia) Ivan Dodig	6	7^{7}
2	(Canada) Gabriela Dabrowski (Croatia) Mate Pavić	1	6^{5}

=== Top half ===
First round
1	(United States) N Melichar (Brazil) B Soares	7	6
(Czech Republic) L Hradecká (India) R Bopanna	5	1
(Slovenia) A Klepač (France) É Roger-Vasselin	6	4	[10]
WC	(France) A Cornet (France) J Eysseric	2	6	[5]
(United States) A Muhammad (United Kingdom) L Bambridge	6^{5}	6	[10]
WC	(France) P Parmentier (France) F Martin	7^{7}	3	[5]
(Kazakhstan) G Voskoboeva (New Zealand) M Venus	4	6	[4]
7	(Poland) A Rosolska (Croatia) N Mektić	6	3	[10]
4	(Netherlands) D Schuurs (Netherlands) J-J Rojer	6^{5}	6^{4}
WC	(France) A Hesse (France) B Bonzi	7^{7}	7^{7}
(Ukraine) L Kichenok (Mexico) S González	6	2	[10]
(Japan) S Aoyama (India) D Sharan	3	6	[7]
(United States) A Spears (Colombia) JS Cabal	6^{5}	2
(Chinese Taipei) L Chan (Croatia) I Dodig	7^{7}	6
(China) Z Yang (Argentina) M González	1	3
8	(Germany) A-L Grönefeld (Colombia) R Farah	6	6

Second round
1	(United States) N Melichar (Brazil) B Soares	6	6
(Slovenia) A Klepač (France) É Roger-Vasselin	4	3
(United States) A Muhammad (United Kingdom) L Bambridge	4	4
7	(Poland) A Rosolska (Croatia) N Mektić	6	6
WC	(France) A Hesse (France) B Bonzi	3	7	[10]
(Ukraine) L Kichenok (Mexico) S González	6	5	[4]
(Chinese Taipei) L Chan (Croatia) I Dodig	6	7^{8}
8	(Germany) A-L Grönefeld (Colombia) R Farah	2	6^{6}

Quarterfinals
1	(United States) N Melichar (Brazil) B Soares	6	7^{7}
7	(Poland) A Rosolska (Croatia) N Mektić	3	6^{4}
WC	(France) A Hesse (France) B Bonzi	4	3
(Chinese Taipei) L Chan (Croatia) I Dodig	6	6

Semifinals
1	(United States) N Melichar (Brazil) B Soares	2	1
(Chinese Taipei) L Chan (Croatia) I Dodig	6	6

=== Bottom half ===
First round
6	(Chinese Taipei) H-c Chan (Austria) O Marach	5	6	[10]
Alt	(Australia) J Moore (India) J Nedunchezhiyan	7	4	[5]
(Japan) E Hozumi (Japan) B McLachlan	1	6	[6]
(Spain) MJ Martínez Sánchez (United Kingdom) N Skupski	6	3	[10]
(Romania) M Buzărnescu (United Kingdom) D Inglot	6	5	[12]
(Croatia) D Jurak (United States) A Krajicek	1	7	[14]
(Japan) M Ninomiya (New Zealand) A Sitak	6	2	[4]
Alt	(Ukraine) N Kichenok (Pakistan) A-u-H Qureshi	3	6	[10]
5	(China) S Zhang (Australia) J Peers	6	7
WC	(France) M Yerolymos (France) G Barrère	2	5
(Hungary) T Babos (Hungary) M Fucsovics	7^{7}	6
WC	(France) M Arcangioli (France) T Lamasine	6^{5}	4
(Romania) R Olaru (Croatia) F Škugor	6	4	[10]
(Czech Republic) K Peschke (Netherlands) W Koolhof	3	6	[7]
(United States) K Christian (Denmark) F Nielsen	4	6^{3}
2	(Canada) G Dabrowski (Croatia) M Pavić	6	7^{7}

Second round
6	(Chinese Taipei) H-c Chan (Austria) O Marach	6	7
(Spain) MJ Martínez Sánchez (United Kingdom) N Skupski	4	5
(Croatia) D Jurak (United States) A Krajicek	4	6	[7]
Alt	(Ukraine) N Kichenok (Pakistan) A-u-H Qureshi	6	4	[10]
5	(China) S Zhang (Australia) J Peers	6	6
(Hungary) T Babos (Hungary) M Fucsovics	0	4
(Romania) R Olaru (Croatia) F Škugor	6^{5}	2
2	(Canada) G Dabrowski (Croatia) M Pavić	7^{7}	6

Quarterfinals
6	(Chinese Taipei) H-c Chan (Austria) O Marach	3	4
Alt	(Ukraine) N Kichenok (Pakistan) A-u-H Qureshi	6	6
5	(China) S Zhang (Australia) J Peers	6	5	[8]
2	(Canada) G Dabrowski (Croatia) M Pavić	1	7	[10]

Semifinals
Alt	(Ukraine) N Kichenok (Pakistan) A-u-H Qureshi	7^{7}	1	[8]
2	(Canada) G Dabrowski (Croatia) M Pavić	6^{4}	6	[10]
