= 2019 French Open – Women's legends doubles =

Women's legends doubles
- 2019 French Open

Final
- Champions: (France) Nathalie Dechy (France) Amélie Mauresmo
- Runners-up: (United States) Martina Navratilova (Russia) Dinara Safina
- Score: 6–3, 6–4

Events
Singles	men	women		boys	girls
Doubles	men	women	mixed	boys	girls
WC Singles	men	women	quad
WC Doubles	men	women	quad
Legends	−45	45+	women
← 2018 ·	French Open	· 2022 →

Nathalie Dechy and Amélie Mauresmo were the defending champions and successfully defended their title, defeating Martina Navratilova and Dinara Safina in the final, 6–3, 6–4.

== Draw ==
=== Key ===
- Q = Qualifier
- WC = Wild card
- LL = Lucky loser
- Alt = Alternate
- ITF = ITF entry
- PR = Protected ranking
- SR = Special ranking
- SE = Special exempt
- JE = Junior exempt
- JR = Junior Accelerator Programme entrant
- CO = College Accelerator Programme entrant
- NG = Next Gen Accelerator Program entrant
- w/o = Walkover
- r = Retired
- d = Defaulted

=== Final ===
Finals
A1	(France) Nathalie Dechy (France) Amélie Mauresmo	6	6
B3	(United States) Martina Navratilova (Russia) Dinara Safina	3	4

=== Group A ===
		(France) N Dechy (France) A Mauresmo	(Spain) C Martínez (France) S Testud	(France) M Bartoli (Croatia) I Majoli	RR; W–L	Set; W–L	Game; W–L	Standings
A1	(France) Nathalie Dechy (France) Amélie Mauresmo		6–2, 6–3	6–2, 6–0	2–0	4–0	24–7	1
A2	(Spain) Conchita Martínez (France) Sandrine Testud	2–6, 3–6		6–2, 7–5	1–1	2–2	18–19	2
A3	(France) Marion Bartoli (Croatia) Iva Majoli	2–6, 0–6	2–6, 5–7		0–2	0–4	9–25	3

Standings are determined by: 1. number of wins; 2. number of matches; 3. in three-players-ties, percentage of sets won, or of games won; 4. steering-committee decision.

=== Group B ===
		(Slovakia) D Hantuchová (France) N Tauziat	(United States) L Davenport (Spain) A Sánchez Vicario	(United States) M Navratilova (Russia) D Safina	RR; W–L	Set; W–L	Game; W–L	Standings
B1	(Slovakia) Daniela Hantuchová (France) Nathalie Tauziat		4–6, 2–6	3–6, 2–6	0–2	0–4	11–24	3
B2	(United States) Lindsay Davenport (Spain) Arantxa Sánchez Vicario	6–4, 6–2		6–2, 6–7^{(5–7)}, [5–10]	1–1	3–2	24–16	2
B3	(United States) Martina Navratilova (Russia) Dinara Safina	6–3, 6–2	2–6, 7–6^{(7–5)}, [10–5]		2–0	4–1	22–17	1

Standings are determined by: 1. number of wins; 2. number of matches; 3. in three-players-ties, percentage of sets won, or of games won; 4. steering-committee decision.
