= 1988 Volvo U.S. National Indoor – Singles =

Singles
- 1988 Volvo U.S. National Indoor

Final
- Champion: (United States) Andre Agassi
- Runner-up: (Sweden) Mikael Pernfors
- Score: 6–4, 6–4, 7–5

Details
- Draw: 48 (4WC/6Q)
- Seeds: 16

Events
Singles	Doubles
← 1987 ·	U.S. National Indoor Championships	· 1989 →

Stefan Edberg was the defending champion, but lost in the third round to Jim Grabb.

Andre Agassi won the title by defeating Mikael Pernfors 6–4, 6–4, 7–5 in the final.

== Seeds ==
All seeds received a bye to the second round.

1. (Sweden) Stefan Edberg (third round)
2. (Ecuador) Andrés Gómez (quarterfinals)
3. (United States) David Pate (quarterfinals)
4. (United States) Eliot Teltscher (third round, withdrew)
5. (Israel) Amos Mansdorf (quarterfinals)
6. (United States) Andre Agassi (champion)
7. (Sweden) Peter Lundgren (second round)
8. (South Africa) Christo van Rensburg (third round)
9. (Sweden) Mikael Pernfors (final)
10. (United States) Kevin Curren (semifinals)
11. (India) Ramesh Krishnan (third round)
12. (United States) Paul Annacone (third round)
13. (New Zealand) Kelly Evernden (second round)
14. (United States) Jim Pugh (third round)
15. (United States) Johan Kriek (third round)
16. (United States) Jay Berger (second round)

== Draw ==
=== Key ===
- Q = Qualifier
- WC = Wild card
- LL = Lucky loser
- Alt = Alternate
- SE = Special exempt
- PR = Protected ranking
- ITF = ITF entry
- JE = Junior exempt
- w/o = Walkover
- r = Retired
- d = Defaulted
- SR = Special ranking

=== Finals ===
Quarterfinals
(United States) Jim Grabb	3	1
9	(Sweden) Mikael Pernfors	6	6
WC	(United States) Robert Seguso	7	7
5	(Israel) Amos Mansdorf	6	6
6	(United States) Andre Agassi	6	6
3	(United States) David Pate	4	2
10	(United States) Kevin Curren	3	6	6
2/WC	(Ecuador) Andrés Gómez	6	3	4

Semifinals
9	(Sweden) Mikael Pernfors	6	6
WC	(United States) Robert Seguso	4	4
6	(United States) Andre Agassi	6	6
10	(United States) Kevin Curren	1	4

Final
9	(Sweden) Mikael Pernfors	4	4	5
6	(United States) Andre Agassi	6	6	7

=== Top half ===
==== Section 1 ====
First round
(United States) R Reneberg	4	6	6
(West Germany) D Keretić	6	4	7
(United States) J Grabb	6	6
(Australia) M Woodforde	3	4
(Mexico) J Lozano	6	2	7
Q	(Canada) G Connell	4	6	6
(Australia) B Dyke	5	2
(United States) G Holmes	7	6

Second round
1	(Sweden) S Edberg	7	6
(West Germany) D Keretić	6	4
(United States) J Grabb	6	3	6
16/Q	(United States) J Berger	4	6	1
9	(Sweden) M Pernfors	4	6	6
(Mexico) J Lozano	6	1	2
(United States) G Holmes	1	5
8	(South Africa) C van Rensburg	6	7

Third round
1	(Sweden) S Edberg	4	4
(United States) J Grabb	6	6
9	(Sweden) M Pernfors	6	6	6
8	(South Africa) C van Rensburg	7	4	3

Quarterfinals
(United States) J Grabb	3	1
9	(Sweden) M Pernfors	6	6

==== Section 2 ====
First round
(United States) S Giammalva Jr.	7	6
(Socialist Federal Republic of Yugoslavia) B Orešar	6	3
(United States) T Wilkison	1	1
WC	(United States) R Seguso	6	6
Q	(United States) R Leach	3	2
WC	(United States) M Chang	6	6
Q	(United States) M Dickson	7	6
(United States) J Brown	5	1

Second round
4	(United States) E Teltscher	6	6
(United States) S Giammalva Jr.	4	4
WC	(United States) R Seguso	6	5	7
13	(New Zealand) K Evernden	3	7	6
11	(India) R Krishnan	5	6	6
WC	(United States) M Chang	7	2	3
Q	(United States) M Dickson	2	4
5	(Israel) A Mansdorf	6	6

Third round
4	(United States) E Teltscher
WC	(United States) R Seguso	w	/	o
11	(India) R Krishnan	2	2
5	(Israel) A Mansdorf	6	6

Quarterfinals
WC	(United States) R Seguso	7	7
5	(Israel) A Mansdorf	6	6

=== Bottom half ===
==== Section 3 ====
First round
(United States) J Ross	6	6
(Australia) W Masur	4	4
(United States) L Duncan	6	6
Q	(Chile) R Acuña	4	2
(United States) D Cassidy	6	6	6
(United States) J Rive	3	7	7
(South Africa) G Muller	6	6
(United States) K Flach	4	3

Second round
6	(United States) A Agassi	6	6
(United States) J Ross	4	4
(United States) L Duncan	2	4
12	(United States) P Annacone	6	6
14	(United States) J Pugh	7	6	6
(United States) J Rive	6	7	3
(South Africa) G Muller	3	2
3	(United States) D Pate	6	6

Third round
6	(United States) A Agassi	6	6	6
12	(United States) P Annacone	7	1	4
14	(United States) J Pugh	6	3	3
3	(United States) D Pate	4	6	6

Quarterfinals
6	(United States) A Agassi	6	6
3	(United States) D Pate	4	2

==== Section 4 ====
First round
(United States) M Davis	6	3
(United States) A Krickstein	7	6
(United States) D Rostagno	7	3	3
(United States) S Davis	6	6	6
WC	(United States) M Purcell	7	6
Q	(South Africa) E Edwards	6	2
(Peru) J Yzaga	6	6
(Canada) C Pridham	3	3

Second round
7	(Sweden) P Lundgren	3	5
(United States) A Krickstein	6	7
(United States) S Davis	7	0	2
10	(United States) K Curren	6	6	6
15	(United States) J Kriek	6	6	6
WC	(United States) M Purcell	7	1	2
(Peru) J Yzaga	5	6	4
2/WC	(Ecuador) A Gómez	7	2	6

Third round
(United States) A Krickstein	4	6
10	(United States) K Curren	6	7
15	(United States) J Kriek	7	3	4
2/WC	(Ecuador) A Gómez	5	6	6

Quarterfinals
10	(United States) K Curren	3	6	6
2/WC	(Ecuador) A Gómez	6	3	4
