= 1988 Volvo U.S. National Indoor – Doubles =

Doubles
- 1988 Volvo U.S. National Indoor

Final
- Champions: (United States) Kevin Curren (United States) David Pate
- Runners-up: (Sweden) Peter Lundgren (Sweden) Mikael Pernfors
- Score: 6–2, 6–2

Events
Singles	Doubles
← 1987 ·	U.S. National Indoor Championships	· 1989 →

Anders Järryd and Jonas Svensson were the defending champions, but none competed this year.

Kevin Curren and David Pate won the title by defeating Peter Lundgren and Mikael Pernfors 6–2, 6–2 in the final.

== Seeds ==
All seeds received a bye to the second round.

1. (United States) Ken Flach / (United States) Robert Seguso (semifinals)
2. (United States) Paul Annacone / (South Africa) Christo van Rensburg (semifinals)
3. (United States) Kevin Curren / (United States) David Pate (champions)
4. (n/a)
5. (United States) Jim Grabb / (United States) Jim Pugh (quarterfinals)
6. (United States) Andy Kohlberg / (United States) Robert Van't Hof (quarterfinals)
7. (Mexico) Jorge Lozano / (United States) Sherwood Stewart (second round)
8. (United States) Martin Davis / (United States) Tim Pawsat (quarterfinals)

== Draw ==
=== Key ===
- Q = Qualifier
- WC = Wild card
- LL = Lucky loser
- Alt = Alternate
- SE = Special exempt
- PR = Protected ranking
- ITF = ITF entry
- JE = Junior exempt
- w/o = Walkover
- r = Retired
- d = Defaulted
- SR = Special ranking

=== Finals ===
Semifinals
1	(United States) Ken Flach (United States) Robert Seguso	4	6	6
3	(United States) Kevin Curren (United States) David Pate	6	1	7
(Sweden) Peter Lundgren (Sweden) Mikael Pernfors	6	5	6
2	(United States) Paul Annacone (South Africa) Christo van Rensburg	4	7	4

Final
3	(United States) Kevin Curren (United States) David Pate	6	6
(Sweden) Peter Lundgren (Sweden) Mikael Pernfors	2	2

=== Top half ===
First round
(Canada) G Connell (United States) L Shiras	6	7
(South Africa) E Edwards (South Africa) G Muller	3	6
(Australia) B Dyke (Australia) W Masur	6	4	6
(United States) M Dickson (United States) T Wilkison	3	6	7
(Chile) R Acuña (Argentina) R Saad	6	6	6
(Australia) C Limberger (Australia) M Woodforde	7	4	3
(South Africa) P Aldrich (South Africa) D Visser	6	1	6
(United States) G Holmes (Australia) D Macpherson	1	6	1

Second round
1	(United States) K Flach (United States) R Seguso	7	7
(Canada) G Connell (United States) L Shiras	5	6
(United States) M Dickson (United States) T Wilkison	6	6	4
8	(United States) M Davis (United States) T Pawsat	3	7	6
3	(United States) K Curren (United States) D Pate	6	6
(Chile) R Acuña (Argentina) R Saad	4	4
(South Africa) P Aldrich (South Africa) D Visser	6	2	3
6	(United States) A Kohlberg (United States) R Van't Hof	4	6	6

Quarterfinals
1	(United States) K Flach (United States) R Seguso	6	7
8	(United States) M Davis (United States) T Pawsat	1	6
3	(United States) K Curren (United States) D Pate	6	7
6	(United States) A Kohlberg (United States) R Van't Hof	4	6

Semifinals
1	(United States) K Flach (United States) R Seguso	4	6	6
3	(United States) K Curren (United States) D Pate	6	1	7

=== Bottom half ===
First round
(United States) M Freeman (United States) M Purcell	6	6	7
WC	(Sweden) S Edberg (Sweden) Lars Nilsson	7	3	5
(Sweden) P Lundgren (Sweden) M Pernfors	6	2	6
(United States) S Giammalva Jr. (United States) E Teltscher	3	6	2
(United States) G Layendecker (United States) J Rive	7	7
(United States) E Korita (United States) B Pearce	6	6
(United States) J Levine (United States) T Siegel	4	4
(New Zealand) K Evernden (United States) J Kriek	6	6

Second round
5	(United States) J Grabb (United States) J Pugh	6	6	6
(United States) M Freeman (United States) M Purcell	7	3	4
(Sweden) P Lundgren (Sweden) M Pernfors	7	7
Alt	(United States) J Letts (United States) M Robertson	6	6
7	(Mexico) J Lozano (United States) S Stewart	3	5
(United States) G Layendecker (United States) J Rive	6	7
(New Zealand) K Evernden (United States) J Kriek	6	6	3
2	(United States) P Annacone (South Africa) C van Rensburg	4	7	6

Quarterfinals
5	(United States) J Grabb (United States) J Pugh	1	7	3
(Sweden) P Lundgren (Sweden) M Pernfors	6	6	6
(United States) G Layendecker (United States) J Rive	6	6
2	(United States) P Annacone (South Africa) C van Rensburg	7	7

Semifinals
(Sweden) P Lundgren (Sweden) M Pernfors	6	5	6
2	(United States) P Annacone (South Africa) C van Rensburg	4	7	4
