= 1989 Volvo U.S. National Indoor – Singles =

Singles
- 1989 Volvo U.S. National Indoor

Final
- Champion: (United States) Brad Gilbert
- Runner-up: (United States) Johan Kriek
- Score: 6–2, 6–2 (Kriek retired)

Details
- Draw: 48 (2 WC / 6 Q)
- Seeds: 16

Events
Singles	Doubles
← 1988 ·	U.S. National Indoor Championships	· 1990 →

Andre Agassi was the defending champion but lost in the third round to Johan Kriek.

Brad Gilbert won in the final 6–2, 6–2 when Kriek was forced to retire.

== Seeds ==
All sixteen seeds received a bye to the second round.

1. (United States) Andre Agassi (third round)
2. (United States) Jimmy Connors (quarterfinals)
3. (United States) Tim Mayotte (third round)
4. (United States) Aaron Krickstein (second round)
5. (Sweden) Mikael Pernfors (third round)
6. (United States) Brad Gilbert (champion)
7. (United States) Kevin Curren (semifinals)
8. (Ecuador) Andrés Gómez (second round)
9. (Israel) Amos Mansdorf (third round)
10. (United States) Dan Goldie (second round)
11. (United States) Michael Chang (semifinals)
12. (South Africa) Christo van Rensburg (second round)
13. (United States) Robert Seguso (second round)
14. (United States) Paul Annacone (second round)
15. (United States) Derrick Rostagno (second round)
16. (United States) Johan Kriek (final)

== Draw ==
=== Key ===
- Q = Qualifier
- WC = Wild card
- LL = Lucky loser
- Alt = Alternate
- SE = Special exempt
- PR = Protected ranking
- ITF = ITF entry
- JE = Junior exempt
- w/o = Walkover
- r = Retired
- d = Defaulted
- SR = Special ranking

=== Finals ===
Semifinals
16	(United States) Johan Kriek	6	1	6
11	(United States) Michael Chang	1	6	3
6	(United States) Brad Gilbert	7	6
7	(United States) Kevin Curren	6	4

Final
16	(United States) Johan Kriek	2	2	0^{r}
6	(United States) Brad Gilbert	6	6	0

=== Top half ===
==== Section 1 ====
First round
(United States) D Pate	1	6
(United States) J Pugh	6	7
(United States) S Giammalva Jr.	3	1
Q	(United States) B Scanlon	6	6
(Brazil) D Marcelino	3	0
Q	(United States) R Reneberg	6	6
(United States) L Shiras	7	6
(United States) M Anger	6	4

Second round
1	(United States) A Agassi	6	6
(United States) J Pugh	2	3
Q	(United States) B Scanlon	1	3
16	(United States) J Kriek	6	6
10	(United States) D Goldie	3	3
Q	(United States) R Reneberg	6	6
(United States) L Shiras	6	3	7
8	(Ecuador) A Gómez	3	6	5

Third round
1	(United States) A Agassi	7	5	3
16	(United States) J Kriek	6	7	6
Q	(United States) R Reneberg	6	6
(United States) L Shiras	1	3

Quarterfinals
16	(United States) J Kriek	6	6
Q	(United States) R Reneberg	3	3

==== Section 2 ====
First round
(United States) J Grabb	6	6
(United States) J Rive	4	2
WC	(Venezuela) N Pereira	4	2
(Australia) B Dyke	6	6
(Netherlands) T Nijssen	6	6
(South Africa) B Moir	1	4
(United States) P Sampras	6	6
(United States) T Wilkison	3	2

Second round
4	(United States) A Krickstein	6	3
(United States) J Grabb	7	6
(Australia) B Dyke	7	6
14	(United States) P Annacone	6	3
11	(United States) M Chang	6	6
(Netherlands) T Nijssen	1	3
(United States) P Sampras	2	2
5	(Sweden) M Pernfors	6	6

Third round
(United States) J Grabb	1	4
(Australia) B Dyke	6	6
11	(United States) M Chang	7	6
5	(Sweden) M Pernfors	5	1

Quarterfinals
(Australia) B Dyke	3	2
11	(United States) M Chang	6	6

=== Bottom half ===
==== Section 3 ====
First round
(United States) S Davis	7	7
(United States) J Courier	6	6
Q	(United States) L Jensen	7	6	4
(Japan) S Matsuoka	6	7	6
Q	(United States) J Arias	6	6
WC	(United States) K Flach	3	3
(Australia) S Youl	7	6
Q	(United States) M Kures	6	1

Second round
6	(United States) B Gilbert	6	6
(United States) S Davis	2	1
(Japan) S Matsuoka	7	2	7
12	(South Africa) C van Rensburg	6	6	5
13	(United States) R Seguso	2	6
Q	(United States) J Arias	6	7
(Australia) S Youl	2	3
3	(United States) T Mayotte	6	6

Third round
6	(United States) B Gilbert	6	6
(Japan) S Matsuoka	2	0
Q	(United States) J Arias	7	6	7
3	(United States) T Mayotte	6	7	6

Quarterfinals
6	(United States) B Gilbert	6	1	6
Q	(United States) J Arias	4	6	2

==== Section 4 ====
First round
(United States) R Matuszewski	6	7
Q	(Canada) C Pridham	4	6
(Canada) G Michibata	7	7
(India) R Krishnan	5	6
(South Africa) P Aldrich	6	1	6
(United States) L Duncan	3	6	3
(Australia) J Stoltenberg	7	6
(West Germany) M Westphal	6	2

Second round
7	(United States) K Curren	6	4	6
(United States) R Matuszewski	3	6	3
(Canada) G Michibata	7	1	1
9	(Israel) A Mansdorf	5	6	6
15	(United States) D Rostagno	5	2
(South Africa) P Aldrich	7	6
(Australia) J Stoltenberg	3	5
2	(United States) J Connors	6	7

Third round
7	(United States) K Curren	6	6
9	(Israel) A Mansdorf	4	0
(South Africa) P Aldrich	2	2
2	(United States) J Connors	6	6

Quarterfinals
7	(United States) K Curren	6	6
2	(United States) J Connors	2	2
