= 1988 Volvo U.S. National Indoor =

- Date: February 15–21
- Edition: 18th
- Category: Grand Prix
- Draw: 48S / 24D
- Prize money: $297,500
- Surface: Hard / indoor
- Location: Memphis, TN, U.S.
- Venue: Racquet Club of Memphis

Champions

Singles
- (United States) Andre Agassi

Doubles
- (United States) Kevin Curren / (United States) David Pate
- U.S. National Indoor Championships

The 1988 Volvo U.S. National Indoor was a men's tennis tournament played on indoor hard courts at the Racquet Club of Memphis in Memphis, Tennessee in the United States that was part of the 1988 Nabisco Grand Prix. It was the 18th edition of the tournament was held from February 15 through February 21, 1988. First-seeded Andre Agassi won the singles title.

== Finals ==
=== Singles ===
(United States) Andre Agassi defeated (Sweden) Mikael Pernfors 6–4, 6–4, 7–5

- It was Agassi's 1st singles title of the year and the 2nd of his career.

=== Doubles ===
(United States) Kevin Curren / (United States) David Pate defeated (Sweden) Peter Lundgren / (Sweden) Mikael Pernfors 6–2, 6–2
