= 2019 French Open =

- Date: 26 May – 9 June 2019
- Edition: 118
- Category: Grand Slam
- Draw: 128S / 64D / 32X
- Prize money: €42,661,000
- Surface: Clay
- Location: Paris (XVI^{e}), France
- Venue: Roland Garros Stadium

Champions

Men's singles
- (Spain) Rafael Nadal

Women's singles
- (Australia) Ashleigh Barty

Men's doubles
- (Germany) Kevin Krawietz / (Germany) Andreas Mies

Women's doubles
- (Hungary) Tímea Babos / (France) Kristina Mladenovic

Mixed doubles
- (Chinese Taipei) Latisha Chan / (Croatia) Ivan Dodig

Wheelchair men's singles
- (Argentina) Gustavo Fernández

Wheelchair women's singles
- (Netherlands) Diede de Groot

Wheelchair quad singles
- (Australia) Dylan Alcott

Wheelchair men's doubles
- (Argentina) Gustavo Fernández / (Japan) Shingo Kunieda

Wheelchair women's doubles
- (Netherlands) Diede de Groot / (Netherlands) Aniek van Koot

Wheelchair quad doubles
- (Australia) Dylan Alcott / (United States) David Wagner

Boys' singles
- (Denmark) Holger Vitus Nødskov Rune

Girls' singles
- (Canada) Leylah Fernandez

Boys' doubles
- (Brazil) Matheus Pucinelli de Almeida / (Argentina) Thiago Agustín Tirante

Girls' doubles
- (United States) Chloe Beck / (United States) Emma Navarro

Legends under 45 doubles
- (France) Sébastien Grosjean / (France) Michaël Llodra

Women's legends doubles
- (France) Nathalie Dechy / (France) Amélie Mauresmo

Legends over 45 doubles
- (Spain) Sergi Bruguera / (Croatia) Goran Ivanišević
- French Open

The 2019 French Open was a major tennis tournament played on outdoor clay courts. It was held at the Stade Roland Garros in Paris, France, from 26 May to 9 June, comprising singles, doubles and mixed doubles play. Junior and wheelchair tournaments were also scheduled. Rafael Nadal was the two-time defending champion in men's singles and won his record 12th French Open singles title. Simona Halep was the defending champion in women's singles, but lost in the quarterfinals; the title was won by Ashleigh Barty.

It was the 118th edition of the French Open and the second Grand Slam event of 2019. The main singles draws included 16 qualifiers for men and 12 for women out of 128 players in each draw. This was in contrast to two other Grand Slam tournaments – the Australian Open and Wimbledon, which from 2019 increased the number of women qualifiers to 16, to match with the US Open.

2019 was the final year in which there was no roof on any of the Roland-Garros tennis courts. On 5 June 2019, the entire day's tennis was washed out due to heavy rain. It is also the only Grand Slam to retain the advantage set in final sets, whereas the Australian Open and Wimbledon have now switched to tiebreaks.

== Tournament ==
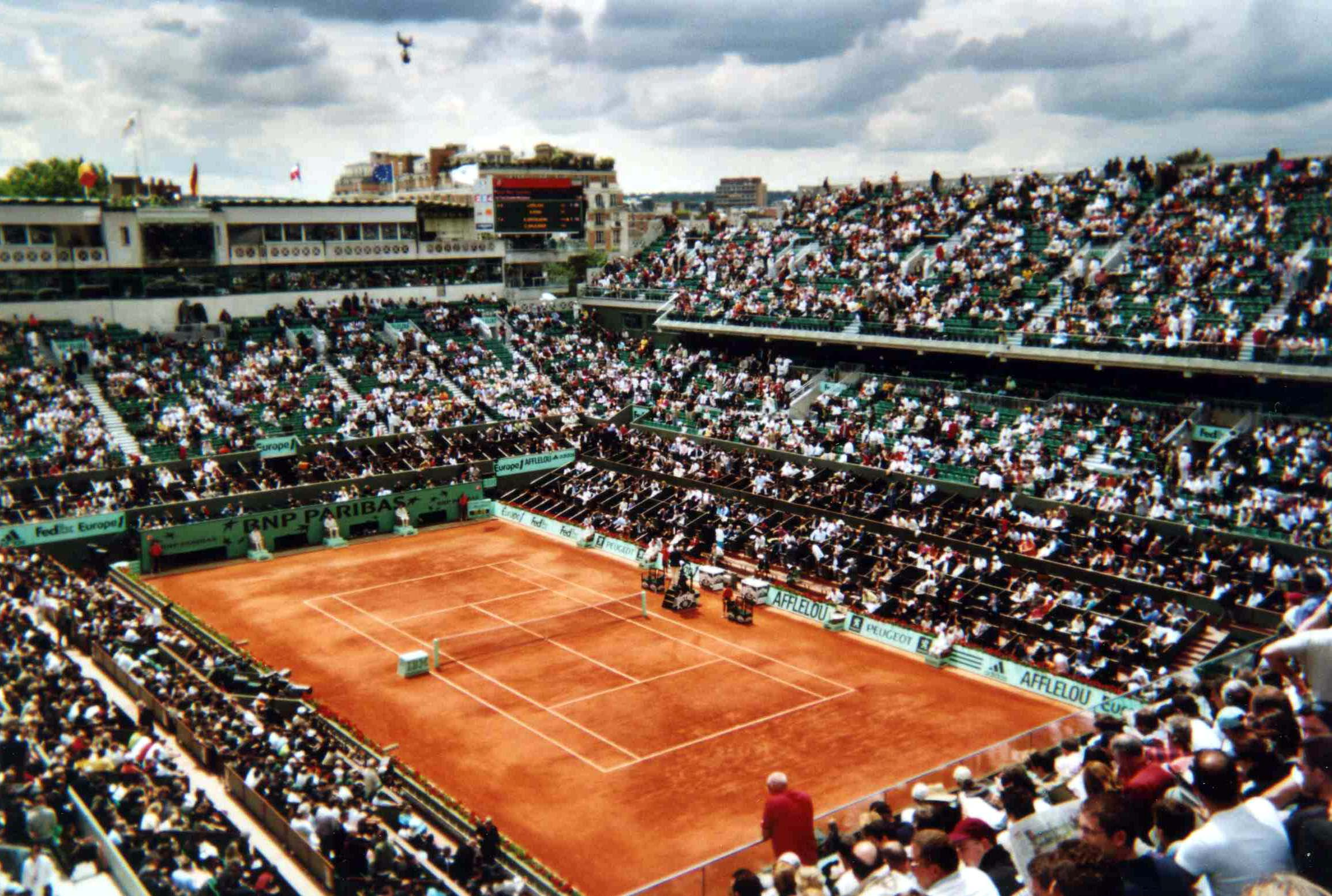
Court Philippe Chatrier, where the finals of the French Open will take place.

The 2019 French Open is the 123rd edition of the French Open and is held at Stade Roland Garros in Paris. A new shot clock that gives 25 seconds for the player serving, between points are introduced. In the juniors tournament, service lets won't be featured.

The tournament is an event run by the International Tennis Federation (ITF) and is part of the 2019 ATP Tour and the 2019 WTA Tour calendars under the Grand Slam category. The tournament consisted of both men's and women's singles and doubles draws as well as a mixed doubles event.

There is a singles and doubles events for both boys and girls (players under 18), which is part of the Grade A category of tournaments, and singles and doubles events for men's and women's wheelchair tennis players under the Grand Slam category, also hosting singles and doubles events for wheelchair quad tennis for the first time. The tournament is played on clay courts and took place over a series of 23 courts, including the three main showcourts, Court Philippe Chatrier, Court Suzanne Lenglen and the newly opened Court Simonne Mathieu.

== Points and prize money ==
=== Points distribution ===
Below is a series of tables for each of the competitions showing the ranking points on offer for each event.

==== Senior points ====
Event	W	F	SF	QF	Round of 16	Round of 32	Round of 64	Round of 128	Q	Q3	Q2	Q1
Men's singles	2000	1200	720	360	180	90	45	10	25	16	8	0
Men's doubles	2000	1200	720	360	180	90	0	—N/a	—N/a	—N/a	—N/a	—N/a
Women's singles	2000	1300	780	430	240	130	70	10	40	30	20	2
Women's doubles	2000	1300	780	430	240	130	10	—N/a	—N/a	—N/a	—N/a	—N/a

==== Wheelchair points ====
Event	W	F	SF/3rd	QF/4th
Singles	800	500	375	100
Doubles	800	500	100	—N/a
Quad singles	800	500	100	—N/a
Quad doubles	800	100	—N/a	—N/a

==== Junior points ====
Event	W	F	SF	QF	Round of 16	Round of 32	Q	Q3
Boys' singles	1000	600	370	200	100	45	30	20
Girls' singles	1000	600	370	200	100	45	30	20
Boys' doubles	750	450	275	150	75	—N/a	—N/a	—N/a
Girls' doubles	750	450	275	150	75	—N/a	—N/a	—N/a

=== Prize money ===
The total prize money for the 2019 edition is €42,661,000, an increase of 8% over 2018. The winners of the men's and women's singles title receive €2,300,000, an increase of €100,000 compared to 2018.

Event	W	F	SF	QF	Round of 16	Round of 32	Round of 64	Round of 128	Q3	Q2	Q1
Singles	€2,300,000	€1,180,000	€590,000	€415,000	€243,000	€143,000	€87,000	€46,000	€24,000	€12,250	€7,000
Doubles *	€580,000	€290,000	€146,000	€79,500	€42,500	€23,000	€11,500	—N/a	—N/a	—N/a	—N/a
Mixed doubles *	€122,000	€61,000	€31,000	€17,500	€10,000	€5,000	—N/a	—N/a	—N/a	—N/a	—N/a
Wheelchair singles	€53,000	€26,500	€13,500	€6,750	—N/a	—N/a	—N/a	—N/a	—N/a	—N/a	—N/a
Wheelchair doubles *	€16,000	€8,000	€4,750	—N/a	—N/a	—N/a	—N/a	—N/a	—N/a	—N/a	—N/a

_{* per team}

== Singles players ==
2019 French Open – Men's singles

Champion		Runner-up	
(Spain) Rafael Nadal [2]		(Austria) Dominic Thiem [4]	
Semifinals out
(Serbia) Novak Djokovic [1]		(Switzerland) Roger Federer [3]	
Quarterfinals out
(Germany) Alexander Zverev [5]	(Russia) Karen Khachanov [10]	(Switzerland) Stan Wawrinka [24]	(Japan) Kei Nishikori [7]
4th round out
(Germany) Jan-Lennard Struff	(Italy) Fabio Fognini [9]	(France) Gaël Monfils [14]	(Argentina) Juan Martín del Potro [8]
(Greece) Stefanos Tsitsipas [6]	(Argentina) Leonardo Mayer	(France) Benoît Paire	(Argentina) Juan Ignacio Londero
3rd round out
(Italy) Salvatore Caruso (Q)	(Croatia) Borna Ćorić [13]	(Spain) Roberto Bautista Agut [18]	(Serbia) Dušan Lajović [30]
(Uruguay) Pablo Cuevas	(France) Antoine Hoang (WC)	(Slovakia) Martin Kližan	(Australia) Jordan Thompson
(Serbia) Filip Krajinović	(Bulgaria) Grigor Dimitrov	(France) Nicolas Mahut (WC)	(Norway) Casper Ruud
(Serbia) Laslo Đere [31]	(Spain) Pablo Carreño Busta	(France) Corentin Moutet (WC)	(Belgium) David Goffin [27]
2nd round out
(Switzerland) Henri Laaksonen (LL)	(France) Gilles Simon [26]	(Moldova) Radu Albot	(South Africa) Lloyd Harris
(Argentina) Federico Delbonis	(United States) Taylor Fritz	(France) Elliot Benchetrit (WC)	(Sweden) Mikael Ymer (Q)
(Kazakhstan) Alexander Bublik	(United Kingdom) Kyle Edmund [28]	(Spain) Fernando Verdasco [23]	(France) Adrian Mannarino
(France) Grégoire Barrère (WC)	(France) Lucas Pouille [22]	(Croatia) Ivo Karlović	(Japan) Yoshihito Nishioka
(Bolivia) Hugo Dellien	(Spain) Roberto Carballés Baena	(Chile) Cristian Garín	(Croatia) Marin Čilić [11]
(Germany) Philipp Kohlschreiber	(Argentina) Diego Schwartzman [17]	(Italy) Matteo Berrettini [29]	(Germany) Oscar Otte (LL)
(France) Jo-Wilfried Tsonga (PR)	(Australia) Alexei Popyrin (WC)	(Australia) Alex de Minaur [21]	(France) Pierre-Hugues Herbert
(France) Richard Gasquet	(Argentina) Guido Pella [19]	(Serbia) Miomir Kecmanović	(Germany) Yannick Maden (Q)
1st round out
(Poland) Hubert Hurkacz	(Spain) Pedro Martínez (Q)	(Spain) Jaume Munar	(Ukraine) Sergiy Stakhovsky (LL)
(Canada) Denis Shapovalov [20]	(United States) Tennys Sandgren (Q)	(Czech Republic) Lukáš Rosol (LL)	(Slovenia) Aljaž Bedene
(Italy) Andreas Seppi	(Spain) Guillermo García López (Q)	(Australia) Bernard Tomic	(United States) Steve Johnson
(Brazil) Thiago Monteiro (Q)	(United Kingdom) Cameron Norrie	(Slovenia) Blaž Rola (Q)	(Australia) John Millman
(United States) Tommy Paul (WC)	(Germany) Rudolf Molleker (Q)	(France) Maxime Janvier (WC)	(France) Jérémy Chardy
(United Kingdom) Dan Evans	(Bosnia and Herzegovina) Damir Džumhur	(Japan) Taro Daniel	(Italy) Stefano Travaglia (Q)
(Germany) Cedrik-Marcel Stebe (PR)	(Australia) Matthew Ebden	(Kazakhstan) Mikhail Kukushkin	(Italy) Simone Bolelli (Q)
(Spain) Alejandro Davidovich Fokina (LL)	(Spain) Feliciano López	(United States) Mackenzie McDonald	(Chile) Nicolás Jarry
(Germany) Maximilian Marterer	(India) Prajnesh Gunneswaran	(France) Alexandre Müller (Q)	(United States) Frances Tiafoe [32]
(Slovakia) Jozef Kovalík (PR)	(United States) Reilly Opelka	(Serbia) Janko Tipsarević (PR)	(Italy) Thomas Fabbiano
(Italy) Marco Cecchinato [16]	(Netherlands) Robin Haase	(Czech Republic) Jiří Veselý	(Hungary) Márton Fucsovics
(Spain) Pablo Andújar	(Latvia) Ernests Gulbis	(Tunisia) Malek Jaziri	(Italy) Lorenzo Sonego
(France) Quentin Halys (WC)	(Germany) Peter Gojowczyk	(France) Ugo Humbert	(Spain) Albert Ramos Viñolas
(United States) Bradley Klahn	(Portugal) João Sousa	(Romania) Marius Copil	(Russia) Daniil Medvedev [12]
(Georgia (country)) Nikoloz Basilashvili [15]	(Germany) Mischa Zverev	(Russia) Alexey Vatutin (Q)	(Argentina) Guido Andreozzi
(Lithuania) Ričardas Berankis	(United States) Denis Kudla	(Belgium) Kimmer Coppejans (Q)	(Germany) Yannick Hanfmann (Q)

2019 French Open – Women's singles

Champion		Runner-up	
(Australia) Ashleigh Barty [8]		(Czech Republic) Markéta Vondroušová	
Semifinals out
(United States) Amanda Anisimova		(United Kingdom) Johanna Konta [26]	
Quarterfinals out
(United States) Madison Keys [14]	(Romania) Simona Halep [3]	(United States) Sloane Stephens [7]	(Croatia) Petra Martić [31]
4th round out
(Czech Republic) Kateřina Siniaková	(United States) Sofia Kenin	(Poland) Iga Świątek	(Spain) Aliona Bolsova (Q)
(Spain) Garbiñe Muguruza [19]	(Croatia) Donna Vekić [23]	(Latvia) Anastasija Sevastova [12]	(Estonia) Kaia Kanepi
3rd round out
(Japan) Naomi Osaka [1]	(Russia) Anna Blinkova (Q)	(United States) Serena Williams [10]	(Germany) Andrea Petkovic
(Ukraine) Lesia Tsurenko [27]	(Puerto Rico) Monica Puig	(Romania) Irina-Camelia Begu	(Russia) Ekaterina Alexandrova
(Slovenia) Polona Hercog	(Ukraine) Elina Svitolina [9]	(Switzerland) Belinda Bencic [15]	(Slovakia) Viktória Kužmová
(Spain) Carla Suárez Navarro [28]	(Belgium) Elise Mertens [20]	(Russia) Veronika Kudermetova	(Czech Republic) Karolína Plíšková [2]
2nd round out
(Belarus) Victoria Azarenka	(Greece) Maria Sakkari [29]	(France) Caroline Garcia [24]	(Australia) Priscilla Hon (WC)
(Japan) Kurumi Nara (Q)	(Canada) Bianca Andreescu [22]	(Chinese Taipei) Hsieh Su-wei [25]	(United States) Danielle Collins
(Poland) Magda Linette	(Serbia) Aleksandra Krunić	(Russia) Daria Kasatkina [21]	(China) Wang Qiang [16]
(Belarus) Aryna Sabalenka [11]	(Czech Republic) Karolína Muchová	(Australia) Samantha Stosur	(Romania) Sorana Cîrstea
(Spain) Sara Sorribes Tormo	(United States) Jennifer Brady	(Sweden) Johanna Larsson	(Ukraine) Kateryna Kozlova
(Germany) Laura Siegemund	(Sweden) Rebecca Peterson	(United States) Lauren Davis (WC)	(Netherlands) Kiki Bertens [4]
(Russia) Anastasia Potapova	(United States) Shelby Rogers (PR)	(France) Diane Parry (WC)	(Luxembourg) Mandy Minella
(Kazakhstan) Zarina Diyas	(China) Zhang Shuai	(France) Kristina Mladenovic	(Slovakia) Kristína Kučová (Q)
1st round out
(Slovakia) Anna Karolína Schmiedlová	(Latvia) Jeļena Ostapenko	(Kazakhstan) Elena Rybakina (Q)	(United States) Anna Tatishvili (PR)
(Germany) Mona Barthel	(Russia) Margarita Gasparyan	(Hungary) Tímea Babos (LL)	(Russia) Evgeniya Rodina
(Russia) Vitalia Diatchenko	(Slovenia) Dalila Jakupović	(Italy) Giulia Gatto-Monticone (Q)	(Czech Republic) Marie Bouzková (LL)
(Switzerland) Viktorija Golubic	(United States) Alison Riske	(Germany) Tatjana Maria	(United States) Jessica Pegula
(Australia) Ajla Tomljanović	(France) Chloé Paquet (WC)	(Australia) Daria Gavrilova	(Canada) Eugenie Bouchard
(Italy) Jasmine Paolini (Q)	(Belgium) Kirsten Flipkens	(France) Séléna Janicijevic (WC)	(China) Zheng Saisai
(Slovakia) Dominika Cibulková	(France) Harmony Tan (WC)	(China) Zhu Lin	(Estonia) Anett Kontaveit [17]
(Romania) Mihaela Buzărnescu [30]	(Czech Republic) Barbora Strýcová	(Russia) Vera Zvonareva	(Slovenia) Kaja Juvan (LL)
(Japan) Misaki Doi	(Belgium) Alison Van Uytvanck	(Serbia) Ivana Jorović	(Belarus) Aliaksandra Sasnovich [32]
(United States) Taylor Townsend	(Slovakia) Magdaléna Rybáriková	(United States) Bernarda Pera (Q)	(United States) Venus Williams
(France) Jessika Ponchet (WC)	(Russia) Sofya Zhuk (Q)	(Kazakhstan) Yulia Putintseva	(Russia) Liudmila Samsonova (Q)
(Germany) Antonia Lottner (Q)	(Czech Republic) Kristýna Plíšková	(France) Alizé Cornet	(France) Pauline Parmentier
(Germany) Angelique Kerber [5]	(China) Wang Yafan	(Australia) Astra Sharma	(Ukraine) Dayana Yastremska
(Slovenia) Tamara Zidanšek	(Belarus) Vera Lapko	(Russia) Anastasia Pavlyuchenkova	(Thailand) Luksika Kumkhum
(Denmark) Caroline Wozniacki [13]	(France) Audrey Albié (WC)	(United States) Varvara Lepchenko (Q)	(Germany) Julia Görges [18]
(Tunisia) Ons Jabeur	(France) Fiona Ferro	(Russia) Svetlana Kuznetsova	(United States) Madison Brengle

== Singles seeds ==
The following are the seeded players and notable players who have withdrawn from the event. Seedings are based on ATP and WTA rankings as of 20 May 2019. Rank and points before are as of 27 May 2019.

=== Men's singles ===
Seed	Rank	Player	Points before	Points defending	Points won	Points after	Status
1	1	(Serbia) Novak Djokovic	12,355	360	720	12,715	Semifinals lost to (Austria) Dominic Thiem [4]
2	2	(Spain) Rafael Nadal	7,945	2,000	2,000	7,945	Champion, defeated (Austria) Dominic Thiem [4]
3	3	(Switzerland) Roger Federer	5,950	0	720	6,670	Semifinals lost to (Spain) Rafael Nadal [2]
4	4	(Austria) Dominic Thiem	4,685	1,200	1,200	4,685	Runner-up, lost to (Spain) Rafael Nadal [2]
5	5	(Germany) Alexander Zverev	4,360	360	360	4,360	Quarterfinals lost to (Serbia) Novak Djokovic [1]
6	6	(Greece) Stefanos Tsitsipas	4,080	45	180	4,215	Fourth round lost to (Switzerland) Stan Wawrinka [24]
7	7	(Japan) Kei Nishikori	3,860	180	360	4,040	Quarterfinals lost to (Spain) Rafael Nadal [2]
8	9	(Argentina) Juan Martín del Potro	3,235	720	180	2,695	Fourth round lost to (Russia) Karen Khachanov [10]
9	12	(Italy) Fabio Fognini	2,785	180	180	2,785	Fourth round lost to (Germany) Alexander Zverev [5]
10	11	(Russia) Karen Khachanov	2,800	180	360	2,980	Quarterfinals lost to (Austria) Dominic Thiem [4]
11	13	(Croatia) Marin Čilić	2,710	360	45	2,395	Second round lost to (Bulgaria) Grigor Dimitrov
12	14	(Russia) Daniil Medvedev	2,625	10	10	2,625	First round lost to (France) Pierre-Hugues Herbert
13	15	(Croatia) Borna Ćorić	2,525	90	90	2,525	Third round lost to (Germany) Jan-Lennard Struff
14	17	(France) Gaël Monfils	1,965	90	180	2,055	Fourth round lost to (Austria) Dominic Thiem [4]
15	16	(Georgia (country)) Nikoloz Basilashvili	1,970	10	10	1,970	First round lost to (Argentina) Juan Ignacio Londero
16	19	(Italy) Marco Cecchinato	1,840	720	10	1,130	First round lost to (France) Nicolas Mahut [WC]
17	20	(Argentina) Diego Schwartzman	1,755	360	45	1,440	Second round lost to (Argentina) Leonardo Mayer
18	21	(Spain) Roberto Bautista Agut	1,690	90	90	1,690	Third round lost to (Italy) Fabio Fognini [9]
19	23	(Argentina) Guido Pella	1,460	45+25	45+20	1,455	Second round lost to (France) Corentin Moutet [WC]
20	24	(Canada) Denis Shapovalov	1,425	45	10	1,390	First round lost to (Germany) Jan-Lennard Struff
21	25	(Australia) Alex de Minaur	1,410	0+65	45+20	1,410	Second round lost to (Spain) Pablo Carreño Busta
22	26	(France) Lucas Pouille	1,385	90	45	1,340	Second round lost to (Slovakia) Martin Kližan
23	27	(Spain) Fernando Verdasco	1,370	180	45	1,235	Second round lost to (France) Antoine Hoang [WC]
24	28	(Switzerland) Stan Wawrinka	1,365	10	360	1,715	Quarterfinals lost to (Switzerland) Roger Federer [3]
~~25~~	~~22~~	~~(Canada) Félix Auger-Aliassime~~	1,482	(20)^{†}	0	1,462	Withdrew due to left abductor injury
26	33	(France) Gilles Simon	1,235	90	45	1,190	Second round lost to (Italy) Salvatore Caruso [Q]
27	29	(Belgium) David Goffin	1,325	180	90	1,235	Third round lost to (Spain) Rafael Nadal [2]
28	30	(United Kingdom) Kyle Edmund	1,325	90	45	1,280	Second round retired against (Uruguay) Pablo Cuevas
29	31	(Italy) Matteo Berrettini	1,320	90	45	1,275	Second round lost to (Norway) Casper Ruud
30	35	(Serbia) Dušan Lajović	1,226	45	90	1,271	Third round lost to (Germany) Alexander Zverev [5]
31	32	(Serbia) Laslo Đere	1,314	10+75	90+10	1,329	Third round lost to (Japan) Kei Nishikori [7]
32	34	(United States) Frances Tiafoe	1,230	10	10	1,230	First round lost to (Serbia) Filip Krajinović

† The player did not qualify for the tournament in 2018. Accordingly, points for his 18th best result are deducted instead.

The following players would have been seeded, but they withdrew from the event.

Rank	Player	Points before	Points defending	Points after	Withdrawal reason
8	(South Africa) Kevin Anderson	3,745	180	3,565	Right elbow injury
10	(United States) John Isner	2,895	180	2,715	Left foot injury
18	(Canada) Milos Raonic	1,960	0	1,960	Right knee injury

=== Women's singles ===
Seed	Rank	Player	Points before	Points defending	Points won	Points after	Status
1	1	(Japan) Naomi Osaka	6,486	130	130	6,486	Third round lost to (Czech Republic) Kateřina Siniaková
2	2	(Czech Republic) Karolína Plíšková	5,685	130	130	5,685	Third round lost to (Croatia) Petra Martić [31]
3	3	(Romania) Simona Halep	5,533	2,000	430	3,963	Quarterfinals lost to (United States) Amanda Anisimova
4	4	(Netherlands) Kiki Bertens	5,405	130	70	5,345	Second round retired against (Slovakia) Viktória Kužmová
5	5	(Germany) Angelique Kerber	5,095	430	10	4,675	First round lost to (Russia) Anastasia Potapova
~~6~~	~~6~~	~~(Czech Republic) Petra Kvitová~~	5,055	130	0	4,925	Withdrew due to left arm injury
7	7	(United States) Sloane Stephens	4,552	1,300	430	3,682	Quarterfinals lost to (United Kingdom) Johanna Konta [26]
8	8	(Australia) Ashleigh Barty	4,420	70	2,000	6,350	Champion, defeated (Czech Republic) Markéta Vondroušová
9	9	(Ukraine) Elina Svitolina	3,967	130	130	3,967	Third round lost to (Spain) Garbiñe Muguruza [19]
10	10	(United States) Serena Williams	3,521	240	130	3,411	Third round lost to (United States) Sofia Kenin
11	11	(Belarus) Aryna Sabalenka	3,505	10	70	3,565	Second round lost to (United States) Amanda Anisimova
12	12	(Latvia) Anastasija Sevastova	3,136	10	240	3,366	Fourth round lost to (Czech Republic) Markéta Vondroušová
13	13	(Denmark) Caroline Wozniacki	3,063	240	10	2,833	First round lost to (Russia) Veronika Kudermetova
14	14	(United States) Madison Keys	2,965	780	430	2,615	Quarterfinals lost to (Australia) Ashleigh Barty [8]
15	15	(Switzerland) Belinda Bencic	2,893	70	130	2,953	Third round lost to (Croatia) Donna Vekić [23]
16	16	(China) Wang Qiang	2,812	130	70	2,752	Second round lost to (Poland) Iga Świątek
17	17	(Estonia) Anett Kontaveit	2,565	240	10	2,335	First round lost to (Czech Republic) Karolína Muchová
18	18	(Germany) Julia Görges	2,520	130	10	2,400	First round lost to (Estonia) Kaia Kanepi
19	19	(Spain) Garbiñe Muguruza	2,465	780	240	1,925	Fourth round lost to (United States) Sloane Stephens [7]
20	20	(Belgium) Elise Mertens	2,305	240	130	2,195	Third round lost (Latvia) Anastasija Sevastova [12]
21	21	(Russia) Daria Kasatkina	2,150	430	70	1,790	Second round lost to (Puerto Rico) Monica Puig
22	23	(Canada) Bianca Andreescu	1,973	30	70	2,013	Second round withdrew due to right shoulder injury
23	24	(Croatia) Donna Vekić	1,940	70	240	2,110	Fourth round lost to (United Kingdom) Johanna Konta [26]
24	22	(France) Caroline Garcia	2,055	240	70	1,885	Second round lost to (Russia) Anna Blinkova [Q]
25	25	(Chinese Taipei) Hsieh Su-wei	1,825	10	70	1,885	Second round lost to (Germany) Andrea Petkovic
26	26	(United Kingdom) Johanna Konta	1,785	10	780	2,555	Semifinals lost to (Czech Republic) Markéta Vondroušová
27	27	(Ukraine) Lesia Tsurenko	1,767	240	130	1,657	Third round lost to (Romania) Simona Halep [3]
28	29	(Spain) Carla Suárez Navarro	1,672	70	130	1,732	Third round lost to (Czech Republic) Markéta Vondroušová
29	30	(Greece) Maria Sakkari	1,642	130	70	1,582	Second round lost to (Czech Republic) Kateřina Siniaková
30	33	(Romania) Mihaela Buzărnescu	1,575	240	10	1,345	First round lost to (Russia) Ekaterina Alexandrova
31	31	(Croatia) Petra Martić	1,615	70	430	1,975	Quarterfinals lost to (Czech Republic) Markéta Vondroušová
32	34	(Belarus) Aliaksandra Sasnovich	1,550	70	10	1,490	First round lost to (Slovenia) Polona Hercog

== Doubles seeds ==
=== Men's doubles ===
Team		Rank^{1}	Seed
(Poland) Łukasz Kubot	(Brazil) Marcelo Melo	7	1
(United Kingdom) Jamie Murray	(Brazil) Bruno Soares	15	2
(Colombia) Juan Sebastián Cabal	(Colombia) Robert Farah	20	3
(Austria) Oliver Marach	(Croatia) Mate Pavić	26	4
(Croatia) Nikola Mektić	(Croatia) Franko Škugor	27	5
(South Africa) Raven Klaasen	(New Zealand) Michael Venus	28	6
(United States) Bob Bryan	(United States) Mike Bryan	35	7
(Finland) Henri Kontinen	(Australia) John Peers	35	8
(Argentina) Máximo González	(Argentina) Horacio Zeballos	39	9
(Netherlands) Jean-Julien Rojer	(Romania) Horia Tecău	41	10
(United States) Rajeev Ram	(United Kingdom) Joe Salisbury	47	11
(Croatia) Ivan Dodig	(France) Édouard Roger-Vasselin	59	12
(France) Nicolas Mahut	(Austria) Jürgen Melzer	60	13
(Netherlands) Robin Haase	(Denmark) Frederik Nielsen	65	14
(Japan) Ben McLachlan	(Germany) Jan-Lennard Struff	69	15
(United States) Austin Krajicek	(New Zealand) Artem Sitak	73	16

- ^{1} Rankings are as of 20 May 2019.

=== Women's doubles ===
Team		Rank^{1}	Seed
(Czech Republic) Barbora Krejčíková	(Czech Republic) Kateřina Siniaková	3	1
(Hungary) Tímea Babos	(France) Kristina Mladenovic	9	2
(Chinese Taipei) Hsieh Su-wei	(Czech Republic) Barbora Strýcová	22	3
(Canada) Gabriela Dabrowski	(China) Xu Yifan	22	4
(Australia) Samantha Stosur	(China) Zhang Shuai	23	5
(Belgium) Elise Mertens	(Belarus) Aryna Sabalenka	29	6
(United States) Nicole Melichar	(Czech Republic) Květa Peschke	29	7
(Chinese Taipei) Chan Hao-ching	(Chinese Taipei) Latisha Chan	32	8
(Germany) Anna-Lena Grönefeld	(Netherlands) Demi Schuurs	34	9
(Czech Republic) Lucie Hradecká	(Slovenia) Andreja Klepač	42	10
(Belarus) Victoria Azarenka	(Australia) Ashleigh Barty	51	11
(Japan) Eri Hozumi	(Japan) Makoto Ninomiya	54	12
(Poland) Alicja Rosolska	(China) Yang Zhaoxuan	56	13
(Romania) Irina-Camelia Begu	(Romania) Mihaela Buzărnescu	61	14
(Belgium) Kirsten Flipkens	(Sweden) Johanna Larsson	70	15
(Croatia) Darija Jurak	(Romania) Raluca Olaru	73	16

- ^{1} Rankings are as of 20 May 2019.

=== Mixed doubles ===
Team		Rank^{1}	Seed
(United States) Nicole Melichar	(Brazil) Bruno Soares	23	1
(Canada) Gabriela Dabrowski	(Croatia) Mate Pavić	23	2
~~(Czech Republic) Barbora Krejčiková~~	~~(United States) Rajeev Ram~~	~~26~~	~~3~~
(Netherlands) Demi Schuurs	(Netherlands) Jean-Julien Rojer	27	4
(China) Zhang Shuai	(Australia) John Peers	28	5
(Chinese Taipei) Chan Hao-ching	(Austria) Oliver Marach	31	6
(Poland) Alicja Rosolska	(Croatia) Nikola Mektić	33	7
(Germany) Anna-Lena Grönefeld	(Colombia) Robert Farah	37	8

- ^{1} Rankings are as of 27 May 2019.

== Main draw wildcard entries ==
The following players were given wildcards to the main draw based on internal selection and recent performances.

=== Men's singles ===
- (France) Grégoire Barrère
- (France) Quentin Halys
- (France) Antoine Hoang
- (France) Maxime Janvier
- (France) Nicolas Mahut
- (France) Corentin Moutet
- (United States) Tommy Paul
- (Australia) Alexei Popyrin

=== Women's singles ===
- (France) Audrey Albié
- (United States) Lauren Davis
- (Australia) Priscilla Hon
- (France) Séléna Janicijevic
- (France) Chloé Paquet
- (France) Diane Parry
- (France) Jessika Ponchet
- (France) Harmony Tan

=== Men's doubles ===
- (France) Grégoire Barrère / (France) Quentin Halys
- (France) Elliot Benchetrit / (France) Geoffrey Blancaneaux
- (France) Benjamin Bonzi / (France) Antoine Hoang
- (France) Mathias Bourgue / (France) Jonathan Eysseric
- (France) Enzo Couacaud / (France) Tristan Lamasine
- (France) Hugo Gaston / (France) Clément Tabur
- (France) Manuel Guinard / (France) Arthur Rinderknech

=== Women's doubles ===
- (France) Julie Belgraver / (France) Mylène Halemai
- (France) Loudmilla Bencheikh / (United States) Cori Gauff
- (France) Estelle Cascino / (France) Elixane Lechemia
- (France) Aubane Droguet / (France) Séléna Janicijevic
- (France) Fiona Ferro / (France) Diane Parry
- (France) Amandine Hesse / (France) Jessika Ponchet
- (France) Chloé Paquet / (France) Pauline Parmentier

=== Mixed doubles ===
- (France) Manon Arcangioli / (France) Tristan Lamasine
- (France) Alizé Cornet / (France) Jonathan Eysseric
- (France) Amandine Hesse / (France) Benjamin Bonzi
- ~~(France) Chloé Paquet / (France) Benoît Paire~~
- (France) Pauline Parmentier / (France) Fabrice Martin
- (France) Margot Yerolymos / (France) Grégoire Barrère

== Main draw qualifiers ==
=== Men's singles ===
Men's Singles Qualifiers

1. (United States) Tennys Sandgren
2. (Italy) Salvatore Caruso
3. (France) Elliot Benchetrit
4. (Sweden) Mikael Ymer
5. (Italy) Simone Bolelli
6. (Russia) Alexey Vatutin
7. (Brazil) Thiago Monteiro
8. (Germany) Yannick Maden
9. (Spain) Pedro Martínez
10. (Belgium) Kimmer Coppejans
11. (Slovenia) Blaž Rola
12. (Spain) Guillermo García López
13. (Italy) Stefano Travaglia
14. (France) Alexandre Müller
15. (Germany) Yannick Hanfmann
16. (Germany) Rudolf Molleker

Lucky Losers

1. (Ukraine) Sergiy Stakhovsky
2. (Czech Republic) Lukáš Rosol
3. (Germany) Oscar Otte
4. (Switzerland) Henri Laaksonen
5. (Spain) Alejandro Davidovich Fokina

=== Women's singles ===
Women's Singles Qualifiers

1. (United States) Bernarda Pera
2. (Slovakia) Kristína Kučová
3. (Japan) Kurumi Nara
4. (Spain) Aliona Bolsova
5. (United States) Varvara Lepchenko
6. (Italy) Giulia Gatto-Monticone
7. (Germany) Antonia Lottner
8. (Russia) Sofya Zhuk
9. (Russia) Anna Blinkova
10. (Russia) Liudmila Samsonova
11. (Italy) Jasmine Paolini
12. (Kazakhstan) Elena Rybakina

Lucky Losers

1. (Czech Republic) Marie Bouzková
2. (Hungary) Tímea Babos
3. (Slovenia) Kaja Juvan

== Protected ranking ==
The following players were accepted directly into the main draw using a protected ranking:

Men's singles

- (France) Jo-Wilfried Tsonga (34)
- (Slovakia) Jozef Kovalík (85)
- (Serbia) Janko Tipsarević (88)
- (Germany) Cedrik-Marcel Stebe (95)

Women's singles

- (United States) Shelby Rogers (81)
- (United States) Anna Tatishvili (107)

Note: Steve Darcis, who would have been placed on the men's entry list on the initial entry cutoff date of 15 April 2019 with a protected ranking of #90, entered late and played the qualifying tournament but lost in the third round.

== Withdrawals ==
The following players were accepted directly into the main draw, but withdrew with injuries or other reasons.

Men's singles

- ‡ (South Africa) Kevin Anderson (7) → replaced by (Germany) Maximilian Marterer (101)
- ‡ (United States) John Isner (10) → replaced by (Spain) Roberto Carballés Baena (103)
- ‡ (Russia) Andrey Rublev (90) → replaced by (Serbia) Filip Krajinović (104)
- † (Czech Republic) Tomáš Berdych (98) → replaced by (Ukraine) Sergiy Stakhovsky (LL)
- † (Canada) Milos Raonic (15) → replaced by (Czech Republic) Lukáš Rosol (LL)
- § (Australia) Nick Kyrgios (34) → replaced by (Germany) Oscar Otte (LL)
- § (Canada) Félix Auger-Aliassime (33) → replaced by (Spain) Alejandro Davidovich Fokina (LL)
- § (United States) Sam Querrey (66) → replaced by (Switzerland) Henri Laaksonen (LL)

Women's singles

- ‡ (Russia) Ekaterina Makarova (91) → replaced by (United States) Anna Tatishvili (107 PR)
- ‡ (Russia) Maria Sharapova (28) → replaced by (Luxembourg) Mandy Minella (108)
- † (Italy) Camila Giorgi (31) → replaced by (Hungary) Tímea Babos (LL)
- § (United Kingdom) Katie Boulter (86) → replaced by (Czech Republic) Marie Bouzková (LL)
- § (Czech Republic) Petra Kvitová (3) → replaced by (Slovenia) Kaja Juvan (LL)

‡ – withdrew from entry list before qualifying began
† – withdrew from entry list after qualifying began
§ – withdrew from main draw

== Champions ==
=== Seniors ===
==== Men's singles ====
- (Spain) Rafael Nadal def. (Austria) Dominic Thiem, 6–3, 5–7, 6–1, 6–1

==== Women's singles ====
- (Australia) Ashleigh Barty def. (Czech Republic) Markéta Vondroušová, 6–1, 6–3

==== Men's doubles ====
- (Germany) Kevin Krawietz / (Germany) Andreas Mies def. (France) Jérémy Chardy / (France) Fabrice Martin, 6–2, 7–6^{(7–3)}

==== Women's doubles ====
- (Hungary) Tímea Babos / (France) Kristina Mladenovic def. (China) Duan Yingying / (China) Zheng Saisai, 6–2, 6–3

==== Mixed doubles ====
- (Chinese Taipei) Latisha Chan / (Croatia) Ivan Dodig def. (Canada) Gabriela Dabrowski / (Croatia) Mate Pavić, 6–1, 7–6^{(7–5)}

=== Juniors ===
==== Boys' singles ====
- (Denmark) Holger Vitus Nødskov Rune def. (United States) Toby Alex Kodat, 6–3, 6–7^{(5–7)}, 6–0

==== Girls' singles ====
- (Canada) Leylah Annie Fernandez def. (United States) Emma Navarro, 6–3, 6–2

==== Boys' doubles ====
- (Brazil) Matheus Pucinelli de Almeida / (Argentina) Thiago Agustín Tirante def. (Italy) Flavio Cobolli / (Switzerland) Dominic Stricker, 7–6^{(7–3)}, 6–4

==== Girls' doubles ====
- (United States) Chloe Beck / (United States) Emma Navarro def. (Russia) Alina Charaeva / (Russia) Anastasia Tikhonova, 6–1, 6–2

=== Wheelchair events ===
==== Wheelchair men's singles ====
- (Argentina) Gustavo Fernández def. (United Kingdom) Gordon Reid, 6–1, 6–3

==== Wheelchair women's singles ====
- (Netherlands) Diede de Groot def. (Japan) Yui Kamiji, 6–1, 6–0

==== Wheelchair quad singles ====
- (Australia) Dylan Alcott def. (United States) David Wagner, 6–2, 4–6, 6–2

==== Wheelchair men's doubles ====
- (Argentina) Gustavo Fernández / (Japan) Shingo Kunieda def. (France) Stéphane Houdet / (France) Nicolas Peifer, 2–6, 6–2, [10–8]

==== Wheelchair women's doubles ====
- (Netherlands) Diede de Groot / (Netherlands) Aniek van Koot def. (Netherlands) Marjolein Buis / (Germany) Sabine Ellerbrock, 6–1, 6–1

==== Wheelchair quad doubles ====
- (Australia) Dylan Alcott / (United States) David Wagner def. (Brazil) Ymanitu Silva / (Japan) Koji Sugeno, 6–3, 6–3

=== Other events ===
==== Legends under 45 doubles ====
- (France) Sébastien Grosjean / (France) Michaël Llodra def. (Spain) Juan Carlos Ferrero / (Ukraine) Andriy Medvedev, 7–6^{(7–4)}, 7–5

==== Legends over 45 doubles ====
- (Spain) Sergi Bruguera / (Croatia) Goran Ivanišević def. (Sweden) Mikael Pernfors / (Sweden) Mats Wilander, 6–2, 4–6, [10–4]

==== Women's legends doubles ====
- (France) Nathalie Dechy / (France) Amélie Mauresmo def. (United States) Martina Navratilova / (Russia) Dinara Safina, 6–3, 6–4

== Sponsors ==
- BNP Paribas
- Peugeot
- Rolex
- Oppo
- Emirates
- Infosys
- Engie
- Lacoste
- Perrier
- Jersey Mike's Subs
- Brighthouse Financial
- Just for Men
- Franklin Templeton Investments

Preceded by 2018 French Open	French Open	Succeeded by 2020 French Open
Preceded by 2019 Australian Open	Grand Slam events	Succeeded by 2019 Wimbledon Championships
