= 1989 Volvo U.S. National Indoor – Doubles =

Doubles
- 1989 Volvo U.S. National Indoor

Final
- Champions: (United States) Paul Annacone; (South Africa) Christo van Rensburg
- Runners-up: (United States) Scott Davis; (United States) Tim Wilkison
- Score: 7–6, 6–7, 6–1

Details
- Draw: 24
- Seeds: 8

Events
Singles	Doubles
← 1988 ·	U.S. National Indoor Championships	· 1990 →

Kevin Curren and David Pate were the defending champions but lost in the second round to Amos Mansdorf and Mikael Pernfors.

Paul Annacone and Christo van Rensburg won in the final 7–6, 6–7, 6–1 against Scott Davis and Tim Wilkison.

== Seeds ==
All eight seeded teams received byes to the second round.

1. (United States) Ken Flach / (United States) Robert Seguso (second round)
2. (United States) Rick Leach / (United States) Jim Pugh (quarterfinals)
3. (United States) Kevin Curren / (United States) David Pate (second round)
4. (South Africa) Pieter Aldrich / (South Africa) Danie Visser (second round)
5. (United States) Jim Grabb / (United States) Patrick McEnroe (semifinals)
6. (United States) Paul Annacone / (South Africa) Christo van Rensburg (champions)
7. (United States) Johan Kriek / (South Africa) Gary Muller (second round)
8. (Canada) Grant Connell / (Canada) Glenn Michibata (semifinals)

== Draw ==
=== Key ===
- Q = Qualifier
- WC = Wild card
- LL = Lucky loser
- Alt = Alternate
- SE = Special exempt
- PR = Protected ranking
- ITF = ITF entry
- JE = Junior exempt
- w/o = Walkover
- r = Retired
- d = Defaulted
- SR = Special ranking

=== Final ===
Semifinals

Final

- (United States) Scott Davis
- (United States) Tim Wilkison
3
6
6

5
- (United States) Jim Grabb
- (United States) Patrick McEnroe
6
2
3

- (United States) Scott Davis
- (United States) Tim Wilkison
6
7
1

6
- (United States) Paul Annacone
- (South Africa) Christo van Rensburg
7
6
6

6
- (United States) Paul Annacone
- (South Africa) Christo van Rensburg
6
6

8
- (Canada) Grant Connell
- (Canada) Glenn Michibata
3
2

=== Top half ===
First round

Second round

Quarterfinals

Semifinals

1
- (United States) K Flach
- (United States) R Seguso
6
6
6

- (United States) S Giammalva Jr.
- (United States) S Stewart
3
6

- (United States) S Davis
- (United States) T Wilkison
7
4
7

- (United States) S Davis
- (United States) T Wilkison
6
7

- (United States) S Davis
- (United States) T Wilkison
6
6
6

- (Australia) J Stoltenberg
- (Australia) S Youl
6
1
2

- (Australia) B Dyke
- (Netherlands) T Nijssen
7
0
4

- (Australia) B Dyke
- (Netherlands) T Nijssen
4
6
6

- (Australia) B Dyke
- (Netherlands) T Nijssen
2
7
6

7
- (United States) J Kriek
- (South Africa) G Muller
6
6
1

- (United States) S Davis
- (United States) T Wilkison
3
6
6

5
- (United States) J Grabb
- (United States) P McEnroe
6
2
3

3
- (United States) K Curren
- (United States) D Pate
4
6
6

- (Israel) A Mansdorf
- (Sweden) M Pernfors
6
6

- (Israel) A Mansdorf
- (Sweden) M Pernfors
6
3
7

- (United States) M Flur
- (United States) R Reneberg
3
2

- (Israel) A Mansdorf
- (Sweden) M Pernfors
0
7
4

- (United States) J Letts
- (United States) B Man-Son-Hing
4
4

5
- (United States) J Grabb
- (United States) P McEnroe
6
5
6

- (United States) S Cannon
- (United States) G Van Emburgh
6
6

- (United States) S Cannon
- (United States) G Van Emburgh
2
2

5
- (United States) J Grabb
- (United States) P McEnroe
6
6

=== Bottom half ===
First round

Second round

Quarterfinals

Semifinals

6
- (United States) P Annacone
- (South Africa) C van Rensburg
6
6

- (United States) J Arias
- (United States) R Baxter
4
7
4

- (Brazil) D Marcelino
- (United States) T Siegel
3
4

- (Brazil) D Marcelino
- (United States) T Siegel
6
5
6

6
- (United States) P Annacone
- (South Africa) C van Rensburg
7
2
6

- (United States) B Gilbert
- (Ecuador) A Gómez
2
6
2

- (United States) D Goldie
- (United States) T Pawsat
6
6
1

- (United States) D Goldie
- (United States) T Pawsat
6
4
6

- (United States) D Goldie
- (United States) T Pawsat
7
6

4
- (South Africa) P Aldrich
- (South Africa) D Visser
6
4

6
- (United States) P Annacone
- (South Africa) C van Rensburg
6
6

8
- (Canada) G Connell
- (Canada) G Michibata
3
2

8
- (Canada) G Connell
- (Canada) G Michibata
6
6

- (United States) G Donnelly
- (United States) P Sampras
6
6
5

- (South Africa) E Edwards
- (United States) L Shiras
4
2

- (South Africa) E Edwards
- (United States) L Shiras
3
7
7

8
- (Canada) G Connell
- (Canada) G Michibata
4
6
6

- (United States) M Anger
- (United States) G Holmes
7
7

2
- (United States) R Leach
- (United States) J Pugh
6
4
3

- (United States) B Garnett
- (United States) B Scanlon
6
5

- (United States) M Anger
- (United States) G Holmes
3
3

2
- (United States) R Leach
- (United States) J Pugh
6
6
