= 2019 French Open – Women's doubles =

Women's doubles
- 2019 French Open

Final
- Champions: (Hungary) Tímea Babos (France) Kristina Mladenovic
- Runners-up: (China) Duan Yingying (China) Zheng Saisai
- Score: 6–2, 6–3

Events
Singles	men	women		boys	girls
Doubles	men	women	mixed	boys	girls
WC Singles	men	women	quad
WC Doubles	men	women	quad
Legends	−45	45+	women
- French Open

Tímea Babos and Kristina Mladenovic defeated Duan Yingying and Zheng Saisai in the final, 6–2, 6–3 to win the women's doubles tennis title at the 2019 French Open.

Barbora Krejčíková and Kateřina Siniaková were the defending champions, but lost in the first round to Nadiia Kichenok and Abigail Spears.

Mladenovic replaced Siniaková as the WTA doubles no. 1 by winning the title. Barbora Strýcová, Elise Mertens, Demi Schuurs, Ashleigh Barty and Zhang Shuai were also in contention for the top ranking.

== Seeds ==
1. (Czech Republic) Barbora Krejčíková / (Czech Republic) Kateřina Siniaková (first round)
2. (Hungary) Tímea Babos / (France) Kristina Mladenovic (champions)
3. (Chinese Taipei) Hsieh Su-wei / (Czech Republic) Barbora Strýcová (third round)
4. (Canada) Gabriela Dabrowski / (China) Xu Yifan (quarterfinals)
5. (Australia) Samantha Stosur / (China) Zhang Shuai (quarterfinals)
6. (Belgium) Elise Mertens / (Belarus) Aryna Sabalenka (semifinals)
7. (United States) Nicole Melichar / (Czech Republic) Květa Peschke (quarterfinals)
8. (Chinese Taipei) Chan Hao-ching / (Chinese Taipei) Latisha Chan (second round)

9. (Germany) Anna-Lena Grönefeld / (Netherlands) Demi Schuurs (second round)
10. (Czech Republic) Lucie Hradecká / (Slovenia) Andreja Klepač (third round)
11. (Belarus) Victoria Azarenka / (Australia) Ashleigh Barty (third round)
12. (Japan) Eri Hozumi / (Japan) Makoto Ninomiya (first round)
13. (Poland) Alicja Rosolska / (China) Yang Zhaoxuan (second round)
14. (Romania) Irina-Camelia Begu / (Romania) Mihaela Buzărnescu (first round)
15. (Belgium) Kirsten Flipkens / (Sweden) Johanna Larsson (semifinals)
16. (Croatia) Darija Jurak / (Romania) Raluca Olaru (first round)

Click on the seed number of a player to go to their draw section.

== Draw ==
Key

- Q = Qualifier
- WC = Wild card
- LL = Lucky loser
- Alt = Alternate
- ITF = ITF entry
- PR = Protected ranking
- SR = Special ranking
- SE = Special exempt
- JE = Junior exempt
- JR = Junior Accelerator Programme entrant
- CO = College Accelerator Programme entrant
- NG = Next Gen Accelerator Program entrant
- w/o = Walkover
- r = Retired
- d = Defaulted

=== Finals ===
Quarterfinals
15	(Belgium) Kirsten Flipkens (Sweden) Johanna Larsson	3	7^{7}	6
7	(United States) Nicole Melichar (Czech Republic) Květa Peschke	6	6^{4}	1
4	(Canada) Gabriela Dabrowski (China) Xu Yifan	2	7	5
(China) Duan Yingying (China) Zheng Saisai	6	5	7
6	(Belgium) Elise Mertens (Belarus) Aryna Sabalenka	7	6
(Ukraine) Lyudmyla Kichenok (Latvia) Jeļena Ostapenko	5	2
5	(Australia) Samantha Stosur (China) Zhang Shuai	6	1	6^{3}
2	(Hungary) Tímea Babos (France) Kristina Mladenovic	3	6	7^{7}

Semifinals
15	(Belgium) Kirsten Flipkens (Sweden) Johanna Larsson	4	4
(China) Duan Yingying (China) Zheng Saisai	6	6
6	(Belgium) Elise Mertens (Belarus) Aryna Sabalenka	2	1
2	(Hungary) Tímea Babos (France) Kristina Mladenovic	6	6

Final
(China) Duan Yingying (China) Zheng Saisai	2	3
2	(Hungary) Tímea Babos (France) Kristina Mladenovic	6	6

=== Top half ===
==== Section 1 ====
First round
1	(Czech Republic) B Krejčíková (Czech Republic) K Siniaková	2	4
(Ukraine) N Kichenok (United States) A Spears	6	6
WC	(France) E Cascino (France) E Lechemia	3	4
(Spain) MJ Martínez Sánchez (Spain) S Sorribes Tormo	6	6
(Luxembourg) M Minella (Belgium) A Van Uytvanck	7	2	2
Alt	(Russia) V Diatchenko (Russia) N Dzalamidze	5	6	6
(Australia) M Adamczak (Australia) J Moore	2	6^{2}
15	(Belgium) K Flipkens (Sweden) J Larsson	6	7^{7}
10	(Czech Republic) L Hradecká (Slovenia) A Klepač	6	6
Alt	(Japan) N Hibino (Czech Republic) R Voráčová	4	2
(United States) S Kenin (Germany) A Petkovic	6	6
(Slovakia) D Cibulková (Czech Republic) L Šafářová	4	0
(Russia) E Alexandrova (Russia) V Zvonareva	6	7^{7}
(Russia) A Pavlyuchenkova (Latvia) A Sevastova	2	6^{5}
(United States) J Brady (United States) A Riske	2	6	2
7	(United States) N Melichar (Czech Republic) K Peschke	6	4	6

Second round
(Ukraine) N Kichenok (United States) A Spears	6	2	6
(Spain) MJ Martínez Sánchez (Spain) S Sorribes Tormo	2	6	3
Alt	(Russia) V Diatchenko (Russia) N Dzalamidze	2	0
15	(Belgium) K Flipkens (Sweden) J Larsson	6	6
10	(Czech Republic) L Hradecká (Slovenia) A Klepač	6	3	6
(United States) S Kenin (Germany) A Petkovic	4	6	3
(Russia) E Alexandrova (Russia) V Zvonareva	7	4	4
7	(United States) N Melichar (Czech Republic) K Peschke	5	6	6

Third round
(Ukraine) N Kichenok (United States) A Spears	3	2
15	(Belgium) K Flipkens (Sweden) J Larsson	6	6
10	(Czech Republic) L Hradecká (Slovenia) A Klepač	3	2
7	(United States) N Melichar (Czech Republic) K Peschke	6	6

Quarterfinals
15	(Belgium) K Flipkens (Sweden) J Larsson	3	7^{7}	6
7	(United States) N Melichar (Czech Republic) K Peschke	6	6^{4}	1

==== Section 2 ====
First round
4	(Canada) G Dabrowski (China) Y Xu	6	1	6
(Romania) I Bara (Slovenia) D Jakupović	1	6	2
WC	(France) L Bencheikh (United States) C Gauff	2	3
(China) X Han (China) Y Wang	6	6
(Belarus) A Sasnovich (United States) T Townsend	4	5
WC	(France) F Ferro (France) D Parry	6	7
(Slovenia) P Hercog (Russia) E Rodina	2	2
13	(Poland) A Rosolska (China) Z Yang	6	6
9	(Germany) A-L Grönefeld (Netherlands) D Schuurs	4	6	7^{8}
PR	(Japan) M Kato (Australia) S Sanders	6	4	6^{6}
(Japan) S Aoyama (Belarus) L Marozava	4	7^{7}	5
(China) Y Duan (China) S Zheng	6	6^{2}	7
(Romania) A Mitu (Kazakhstan) Y Putintseva	4	1
(Russia) D Kasatkina (Estonia) A Kontaveit	6	6

Second round
4	(Canada) G Dabrowski (China) Y Xu	6	6
(China) X Han (China) Y Wang	1	1
WC	(France) F Ferro (France) D Parry	7	4	6
13	(Poland) A Rosolska (China) Z Yang	5	6	4
9	(Germany) A-L Grönefeld (Netherlands) D Schuurs	3	2
(China) Y Duan (China) S Zheng	6	6
(Russia) D Kasatkina (Estonia) A Kontaveit	3	6	6
8	(Chinese Taipei) H-c Chan (Chinese Taipei) L Chan	6	3	4

Third round
4	(Canada) G Dabrowski (China) Y Xu	6	7^{7}
WC	(France) F Ferro (France) D Parry	1	6^{5}
(China) Y Duan (China) S Zheng	5	7	6
(Russia) D Kasatkina (Estonia) A Kontaveit	7	5	4

Quarterfinals
4	(Canada) G Dabrowski (China) Y Xu	2	7	5
(China) Y Duan (China) S Zheng	6	5	7

=== Bottom half ===
==== Section 3 ====
First round
6	(Belgium) E Mertens (Belarus) A Sabalenka	6	6
(Germany) T Maria (United Kingdom) H Watson	3	2
WC	(France) A Droguet (France) S Janicijevic	2	2
(Georgia (country)) O Kalashnikova (Sweden) R Peterson	6	6
(Switzerland) V Golubic (Czech Republic) K Muchová	6^{8}	5
(United States) R Atawo (Slovenia) K Srebotnik	7^{10}	7
(United States) D Krawczyk (United States) J Pegula	4	6	7
12	(Japan) E Hozumi (Japan) M Ninomiya	6	2	5
14	(Romania) I-C Begu (Romania) M Buzărnescu	7^{8}	3	4
(Ukraine) L Kichenok (Latvia) J Ostapenko	6^{6}	6	6
(Slovakia) M Rybáriková (Czech Republic) M Vondroušová	2	6	6
WC	(France) A Hesse (France) J Ponchet	6	3	3
Alt	(Australia) A Sharma (Brazil) L Stefani	4	7^{7}	6^{5}
PR	(Puerto Rico) M Puig (United States) S Rogers	6	6^{3}	7^{7}
(United States) A Muhammad (United States) M Sanchez	0	1
3	(Chinese Taipei) S-w Hsieh (Czech Republic) B Strýcová	6	6

Second round
6	(Belgium) E Mertens (Belarus) A Sabalenka	6	6
(Georgia (country)) O Kalashnikova (Sweden) R Peterson	4	3
(United States) R Atawo (Slovenia) K Srebotnik	5	3
(United States) D Krawczyk (United States) J Pegula	7	6
(Ukraine) L Kichenok (Latvia) J Ostapenko	w/o
(Slovakia) M Rybáriková (Czech Republic) M Vondroušová
PR	(Puerto Rico) M Puig (United States) S Rogers	2	5
3	(Chinese Taipei) S-w Hsieh (Czech Republic) B Strýcová	6	7

Third round
6	(Belgium) E Mertens (Belarus) A Sabalenka	7	6
(United States) D Krawczyk (United States) J Pegula	5	2
(Ukraine) L Kichenok (Latvia) J Ostapenko	7	6
3	(Chinese Taipei) S-w Hsieh (Czech Republic) B Strýcová	5	1

Quarterfinals
6	(Belgium) E Mertens (Belarus) A Sabalenka	7	6
(Ukraine) L Kichenok (Latvia) J Ostapenko	5	2

==== Section 4 ====
First round
5	(Australia) S Stosur (China) S Zhang	6	6
(Russia) V Kudermetova (Kazakhstan) G Voskoboeva	3	0
WC	(France) J Belgraver (France) M Halemai	2	3
(United States) D Collins (United States) S Santamaria	6	6
WC	(France) C Paquet (France) P Parmentier	5	7	4
(Switzerland) B Bencic (Slovakia) V Kužmová	7	5	6
(Serbia) A Krunić (Australia) A Tomljanović	1	1
11	(Belarus) V Azarenka (Australia) A Barty	6	6
16	(Croatia) D Jurak (Romania) R Olaru	2	3
PR	(Germany) A-L Friedsam (Germany) L Siegemund	6	6
(United States) A Anisimova (Switzerland) X Knoll	7	4	6
(United States) K Christian (Mexico) G Olmos	5	6	3
(France) A Cornet (Croatia) P Martić	6	6
(Chile) A Guarachi (Slovenia) T Zidanšek	1	0
(China) X Jiang (China) Q Wang	2	2
2	(Hungary) T Babos (France) K Mladenovic	6	6

Second round
5	(Australia) S Stosur (China) S Zhang	6	6
(United States) D Collins (United States) S Santamaria	4	4
(Switzerland) B Bencic (Slovakia) V Kužmová	6	6^{6}	1
11	(Belarus) V Azarenka (Australia) A Barty	4	7^{8}	6
PR	(Germany) A-L Friedsam (Germany) L Siegemund	5
(United States) A Anisimova (Switzerland) X Knoll	0^{r}
(France) A Cornet (Croatia) P Martić	5	1
2	(Hungary) T Babos (France) K Mladenovic	7	6

Third round
5	(Australia) S Stosur (China) S Zhang	4	6	6
11	(Belarus) V Azarenka (Australia) A Barty	6	3	2
PR	(Germany) A-L Friedsam (Germany) L Siegemund	6	3	3
2	(Hungary) T Babos (France) K Mladenovic	4	6	6

Quarterfinals
5	(Australia) S Stosur (China) S Zhang	6	1	6^{3}
2	(Hungary) T Babos (France) K Mladenovic	3	6	7^{7}
