= 2019 French Open – Women's singles =

Women's singles
- 2019 French Open

Final
- Champion: (Australia) Ashleigh Barty
- Runner-up: (Czech Republic) Markéta Vondroušová
- Score: 6−1, 6−3

Details
- Draw: 128
- Seeds: 32

Events
Singles	men	women		boys	girls
Doubles	men	women	mixed	boys	girls
WC Singles	men	women	quad
WC Doubles	men	women	quad
Legends	−45	45+	women
- French Open

Ashleigh Barty defeated Markéta Vondroušová in the final, 6–1, 6–3 to win the women's singles tennis title at the 2019 French Open. It was her first major singles title, making her the first Australian to win a French Open singles title since Margaret Court in 1973 and the first to win any major singles title since Samantha Stosur at the 2011 US Open.

Simona Halep was the defending champion, but lost to Amanda Anisimova in the quarterfinals. Anisimova was the first tennis player born in the 21st century to reach the quarterfinals and semifinals of a major.

Naomi Osaka retained the world No. 1 singles ranking after Karolína Plíšková lost in the third round. Angelique Kerber, Kiki Bertens and Petra Kvitová were also in contention for the top ranking. Osaka's streak of 16 consecutive wins at the majors was broken when she lost to Kateřina Siniaková in the third round.

For the first time since the 1978 Australian Open, none of the four semifinalists had previously reached a major singles final. Of the four, Johanna Konta was the only one who had previously reached a semifinal. Of Konta's seven appearances in the main draw of the French Open, this was the only edition where she progressed beyond the first round.

This marked the final major main draw appearance of former world No. 4 and 2016 WTA Finals champion Dominika Cibulková; she was defeated by Aryna Sabalenka in the first round. It was the first French Open main draw appearance of future world No. 1 and four-time champion Iga Świątek, who lost in the fourth round to Halep. It was also the first major appearance of future world No. 1 and three-time major champion Elena Rybakina, who lost to Siniaková in the first round.

== Seeds ==
Seeding per WTA rankings.

1. (Japan) Naomi Osaka (third round)
2. (Czech Republic) Karolína Plíšková (third round)
3. (Romania) Simona Halep (quarterfinals)
4. (Netherlands) Kiki Bertens (second round, retired)
5. (Germany) Angelique Kerber (first round)
6. (Czech Republic) Petra Kvitová (withdrew)
7. (United States) Sloane Stephens (quarterfinals)
8. (Australia) Ashleigh Barty (champion)
9. (Ukraine) Elina Svitolina (third round)
10. (United States) Serena Williams (third round)
11. (Belarus) Aryna Sabalenka (second round)
12. (Latvia) Anastasija Sevastova (fourth round)
13. (Denmark) Caroline Wozniacki (first round)
14. (United States) Madison Keys (quarterfinals)
15. (Switzerland) Belinda Bencic (third round)
16. (China) Wang Qiang (second round)

17. (Estonia) Anett Kontaveit (first round)
18. (Germany) Julia Görges (first round)
19. (Spain) Garbiñe Muguruza (fourth round)
20. (Belgium) Elise Mertens (third round)
21. (Russia) Daria Kasatkina (second round)
22. (Canada) Bianca Andreescu (second round, withdrew)
23. (Croatia) Donna Vekić (fourth round)
24. (France) Caroline Garcia (second round)
25. (Chinese Taipei) Hsieh Su-wei (second round)
26. (United Kingdom) Johanna Konta (semifinals)
27. (Ukraine) Lesia Tsurenko (third round)
28. (Spain) Carla Suárez Navarro (third round)
29. (Greece) Maria Sakkari (second round)
30. (Romania) Mihaela Buzărnescu (first round)
31. (Croatia) Petra Martić (quarterfinals)
32. (Belarus) Aliaksandra Sasnovich (first round)

Click on the seed number of a player to go to their draw section.

== Draw ==
Key

- Q = Qualifier
- WC = Wild card
- LL = Lucky loser
- Alt = Alternate
- ITF = ITF entry
- PR = Protected ranking
- SR = Special ranking
- SE = Special exempt
- JE = Junior exempt
- JR = Junior Accelerator Programme entrant
- CO = College Accelerator Programme entrant
- NG = Next Gen Accelerator Program entrant
- w/o = Walkover
- r = Retired
- d = Defaulted

=== Finals ===
Quarterfinals
14	(United States) Madison Keys	3	5
8	(Australia) Ashleigh Barty	6	7
3	(Romania) Simona Halep	2	4
(United States) Amanda Anisimova	6	6
7	(United States) Sloane Stephens	1	4
26	(United Kingdom) Johanna Konta	6	6
(Czech Republic) Markéta Vondroušová	7^{7}	7
31	(Croatia) Petra Martić	6^{1}	5

Semifinals
8	(Australia) Ashleigh Barty	6^{4}	6	6
(United States) Amanda Anisimova	7^{7}	3	3
26	(United Kingdom) Johanna Konta	5	6^{2}
(Czech Republic) Markéta Vondroušová	7	7^{7}

Final
8	(Australia) Ashleigh Barty	6	6
(Czech Republic) Markéta Vondroušová	1	3

=== Top half ===
==== Section 1 ====
First round
1	(Japan) N Osaka	0	7^{7}	6
(Slovakia) AK Schmiedlová	6	6^{4}	1
(Latvia) J Ostapenko	4	6^{4}
(Belarus) V Azarenka	6	7^{7}
Q	(Kazakhstan) E Rybakina	6^{5}	1
(Czech Republic) K Siniaková	7^{7}	6
PR	(United States) A Tatishvili	0	1
29	(Greece) M Sakkari	6	6
24	(France) C Garcia	6	6
(Germany) M Barthel	2	4
Q	(Russia) A Blinkova	6	4	8
(Russia) M Gasparyan	3	6	6
LL	(Hungary) T Babos	6	2	1
WC	(Australia) P Hon	3	6	6
(Russia) E Rodina	1	2
14	(United States) M Keys	6	6

Second round
1	(Japan) N Osaka	4	7	6
(Belarus) V Azarenka	6	5	3
(Czech Republic) K Siniaková	7^{7}	6^{8}	6
29	(Greece) M Sakkari	6^{5}	7^{10}	3
24	(France) C Garcia	6	4	4
Q	(Russia) A Blinkova	1	6	6
WC	(Australia) P Hon	5	7	3
14	(United States) M Keys	7	5	6

Third round
1	(Japan) N Osaka	4	2
(Czech Republic) K Siniaková	6	6
Q	(Russia) A Blinkova	3	7^{7}	4
14	(United States) M Keys	6	6^{5}	6

Fourth round
(Czech Republic) K Siniaková	2	4
14	(United States) M Keys	6	6

==== Section 2 ====
First round
10	(United States) S Williams	2	6	6
(Russia) V Diatchenko	6	1	0
Q	(Japan) K Nara	7	5	6
(Slovenia) D Jakupović	5	7	3
Q	(Italy) G Gatto-Monticone	3	7	2
(United States) S Kenin	6	5	6
LL	(Czech Republic) M Bouzková	7	4	4
22	(Canada) B Andreescu	5	6	6
25	(Chinese Taipei) S-w Hsieh	6	3	6
(Switzerland) V Golubic	4	6	0
(United States) A Riske	6	3	5
(Germany) A Petkovic	2	6	7
(United States) D Collins	6	6
(Germany) T Maria	0	2
(United States) J Pegula	3	3
8	(Australia) A Barty	6	6

Second round
10	(United States) S Williams	6	6
Q	(Japan) K Nara	3	2
(United States) S Kenin
22	(Canada) B Andreescu	w/o
25	(Chinese Taipei) S-w Hsieh	6	3	6
(Germany) A Petkovic	4	6	8
(United States) D Collins	5	1
8	(Australia) A Barty	7	6

Third round
10	(United States) S Williams	2	5
(United States) S Kenin	6	7
(Germany) A Petkovic	3	1
8	(Australia) A Barty	6	6

Fourth round
(United States) S Kenin	3	6	0
8	(Australia) A Barty	6	3	6

==== Section 3 ====
First round
3	(Romania) S Halep	6	3	6
(Australia) A Tomljanović	2	6	1
WC	(France) C Paquet	6	1	2
(Poland) M Linette	3	6	6
(Australia) D Gavrilova	3	2^{r}
(Serbia) A Krunić	6	2
(Canada) E Bouchard	2	2
27	(Ukraine) L Tsurenko	6	6
21	(Russia) D Kasatkina	6	6
Q	(Italy) J Paolini	2	3
(Puerto Rico) M Puig	6	7
(Belgium) K Flipkens	1	5
(Poland) I Świątek	6	6
WC	(France) S Janicijevic	3	0
(China) S Zheng	1	5
16	(China) Q Wang	6	7

Second round
3	(Romania) S Halep	6	5	6
(Poland) M Linette	4	7	3
(Serbia) A Krunić	7	5	9
27	(Ukraine) L Tsurenko	5	7	11
21	(Russia) D Kasatkina	3	1
(Puerto Rico) M Puig	6	6
(Poland) I Świątek	6	6
16	(China) Q Wang	3	0

Third round
3	(Romania) S Halep	6	6
27	(Ukraine) L Tsurenko	2	1
(Puerto Rico) M Puig	6	3	3
(Poland) I Świątek	0	6	6

Fourth round
3	(Romania) S Halep	6	6
(Poland) I Świątek	1	0

==== Section 4 ====
First round
11	(Belarus) A Sabalenka	7	6
(Slovakia) D Cibulková	5	1
(United States) A Anisimova	6	6
WC	(France) H Tan	3	1
(Romania) I-C Begu	6	6
(China) L Zhu	1	1
(Czech Republic) K Muchová	3	6	6
17	(Estonia) A Kontaveit	6	2	2
30	(Romania) M Buzărnescu	4	4
(Russia) E Alexandrova	6	6
(Czech Republic) B Strýcová	2	6^{3}
(Australia) S Stosur	6	7^{7}
Q	(Spain) A Bolsova	6	6
(Russia) V Zvonareva	4	2
(Romania) S Cîrstea	5	6	7
LL	(Slovenia) K Juvan	7	4	5

Second round
11	(Belarus) A Sabalenka	4	2
(United States) A Anisimova	6	6
(Romania) I-C Begu	1	6	6
(Czech Republic) K Muchová	6	3	4
(Russia) E Alexandrova	3	6	6
(Australia) S Stosur	6	1	4
Q	(Spain) A Bolsova	7^{7}	7^{7}
(Romania) S Cîrstea	6^{5}	6^{3}

Third round
(United States) A Anisimova	7^{8}	6
(Romania) I-C Begu	6^{6}	4
(Russia) E Alexandrova	2	5
Q	(Spain) A Bolsova	6	7

Fourth round
(United States) A Anisimova	6	6
Q	(Spain) A Bolsova	3	0

=== Bottom half ===
==== Section 5 ====
First round
7	(United States) S Stephens	6	7^{7}
(Japan) M Doi	3	6^{4}
(Spain) S Sorribes Tormo	6	5	6
(Belgium) A Van Uytvanck	1	7	2
(United States) J Brady	7^{7}	4	7
(Serbia) I Jorović	6^{5}	6	5
(Slovenia) P Hercog	4	6	8
32	(Belarus) A Sasnovich	6	2	6
19	(Spain) G Muguruza	5	6	6
(United States) T Townsend	7	2	2
(Slovakia) M Rybáriková	3	4
(Sweden) J Larsson	6	6
Q	(United States) B Pera	2	6^{5}
(Ukraine) K Kozlova	6	7^{7}
(United States) V Williams	3	3
9	(Ukraine) E Svitolina	6	6

Second round
7	(United States) S Stephens	6	7^{7}
(Spain) S Sorribes Tormo	1	6^{3}
(United States) J Brady	3	7^{10}	4
(Slovenia) P Hercog	6	6^{8}	6
19	(Spain) G Muguruza	6	6
(Sweden) J Larsson	4	1
(Ukraine) K Kozlova
9	(Ukraine) E Svitolina	w/o

Third round
7	(United States) S Stephens	6	5	6
(Slovenia) P Hercog	3	7	4
19	(Spain) G Muguruza	6	6
9	(Ukraine) E Svitolina	3	3

Fourth round
7	(United States) S Stephens	6	6
19	(Spain) G Muguruza	4	3

==== Section 6 ====
First round
15	(Switzerland) B Bencic	6	6
WC	(France) J Ponchet	1	4
(Germany) L Siegemund	6	6
Q	(Russia) S Zhuk	3	3
(Kazakhstan) Y Putintseva	3	5
(Sweden) R Peterson	6	7
Q	(Russia) L Samsonova	2	4
23	(Croatia) D Vekić	6	6
26	(United Kingdom) J Konta	6	6
Q	(Germany) A Lottner	4	4
WC	(United States) L Davis	6	6
(Czech Republic) Kr Plíšková	2	4
(Slovakia) V Kužmová	6	6
(France) A Cornet	4	3
(France) P Parmentier	3	4
4	(Netherlands) K Bertens	6	6

Second round
15	(Switzerland) B Bencic	4	6	6
(Germany) L Siegemund	6	4	4
(Sweden) R Peterson	6	1	2
23	(Croatia) D Vekić	1	6	6
26	(United Kingdom) J Konta	6	1	6
WC	(United States) L Davis	3	6	3
(Slovakia) V Kužmová	3
4	(Netherlands) K Bertens	1^{r}

Third round
15	(Switzerland) B Bencic	4	1
23	(Croatia) D Vekić	6	6
26	(United Kingdom) J Konta	6	6
(Slovakia) V Kužmová	2	1

Fourth round
23	(Croatia) D Vekić	2	4
26	(United Kingdom) J Konta	6	6

==== Section 7 ====
First round
5	(Germany) A Kerber	4	2
(Russia) A Potapova	6	6
(China) Y Wang	4	3
(Czech Republic) M Vondroušová	6	6
(Australia) A Sharma	3	3
PR	(United States) S Rogers	6	6
(Ukraine) D Yastremska	6	6^{0}	0
28	(Spain) C Suárez Navarro	2	7^{7}	6
20	(Belgium) E Mertens	6	3	6
(Slovenia) T Zidanšek	4	6	2
WC	(France) D Parry	6	6
(Belarus) V Lapko	2	4
(Russia) A Pavlyuchenkova	4	2
(Luxembourg) M Minella	6	6
(Thailand) L Kumkhum	1	4
12	(Latvia) A Sevastova	6	6

Second round
(Russia) A Potapova	4	0
(Czech Republic) M Vondroušová	6	6
PR	(United States) S Rogers	1	7^{7}	3
28	(Spain) C Suárez Navarro	6	6^{4}	6
20	(Belgium) E Mertens	6	6
WC	(France) D Parry	1	3
(Luxembourg) M Minella	2	4
12	(Latvia) A Sevastova	6	6

Third round
(Czech Republic) M Vondroušová	6	6
28	(Spain) C Suárez Navarro	4	4
20	(Belgium) E Mertens	7^{7}	4	9
12	(Latvia) A Sevastova	6^{3}	6	11

Fourth round
(Czech Republic) M Vondroušová	6	6
12	(Latvia) A Sevastova	2	0

==== Section 8 ====
First round
13	(Denmark) C Wozniacki	6	3	3
(Russia) V Kudermetova	0	6	6
(Kazakhstan) Z Diyas	6	6
WC	(France) A Albié	2	2
(China) S Zhang	6	6
Q	(United States) V Lepchenko	1	1
(Estonia) K Kanepi	7	6
18	(Germany) J Görges	5	1
31	(Croatia) P Martić	6	6
(Tunisia) O Jabeur	1	2
(France) F Ferro	3	6^{3}
(France) K Mladenovic	6	7^{7}
(Russia) S Kuznetsova	4	2
Q	(Slovakia) K Kučová	6	6
(United States) M Brengle	2	3
2	(Czech Republic) Ka Plíšková	6	6

Second round
(Russia) V Kudermetova	7	6
(Kazakhstan) Z Diyas	5	1
(China) S Zhang	7^{7}	0	5
(Estonia) K Kanepi	6^{4}	6	7
31	(Croatia) P Martić	6	6
(France) K Mladenovic	2	1
Q	(Slovakia) K Kučová	2	2
2	(Czech Republic) Ka Plíšková	6	6

Third round
(Russia) V Kudermetova	6	3	0
(Estonia) K Kanepi	4	6	6
31	(Croatia) P Martić	6	6
2	(Czech Republic) Ka Plíšková	3	3

Fourth round
(Estonia) K Kanepi	7	2	4
31	(Croatia) P Martić	5	6	6

== Championship match ratings ==
1.030 million on NBC, in the USA

== Championship match statistics ==
Category	(Australia) Barty	(Czech Republic) Vondroušová
1st serve %	37/54 (69%)	49/64 (77%)
1st serve points won	23 of 37 = 62%	23 of 49 = 47%
2nd serve points won	13 of 17 = 76%	8 of 15 = 53%
Total service points won	36 of 54 = 66.67%	31 of 64 = 48.44%
Aces	3	1
Double faults	1	3
Winners	27	10
Unforced errors	26	22
Net points won	15 of 20 = 75%	8 of 16 = 50%
Break points converted	5 of 13 = 38%	1 of 4 = 25%
Return points won	33 of 64 = 52%	18 of 54 = 33%
Total points won	69	49

Preceded by 2019 Australian Open – Women's singles	Grand Slam women's singles	Succeeded by 2019 Wimbledon Championships – Women's singles
