= 1989 Volvo U.S. National Indoor =

- Date: February 13–19
- Edition: 19th
- Category: Grand Prix
- Draw: 48S / 24D
- Prize money: $297,000
- Surface: Hard / indoor
- Location: Memphis, TN, U.S.
- Venue: Racquet Club of Memphis

Champions

Singles
- (United States) Brad Gilbert

Doubles
- (United States) Paul Annacone / (South Africa) Christo van Rensburg
- U.S. National Indoor Championships

The 1989 Volvo U.S. National Indoor was a men's tennis tournament played on indoor hard courts at the Racquet Club of Memphis in Memphis, Tennessee in the United States that was part of the 1989 Nabisco Grand Prix. It was the 19th edition of the tournament was held from February 13 through February 19, 1989. Sixth-seeded Brad Gilbert won the singles title.

== Finals ==
=== Singles ===
(United States) Brad Gilbert defeated (United States) Johan Kriek 6–2, 6–2 (Kriek retired)

- It was Gilbert's 1st title of the year and the 15th of his career.

=== Doubles ===
(United States) Paul Annacone / (South Africa) Christo van Rensburg defeated (United States) Scott Davis / (United States) Tim Wilkison 7–6, 6–7, 6–1

- It was Annacone's 1st title of the year and the 12th of his career. It was van Rensburg's 1st title of the year and the 12th of his career.
