= 2019 French Open – Men's doubles =

Men's doubles
- 2019 French Open

Final
- Champions: (Germany) Kevin Krawietz (Germany) Andreas Mies
- Runners-up: (France) Jérémy Chardy (France) Fabrice Martin
- Score: 6–2, 7–6^{(7–3)}

Details
- Draw: 64
- Seeds: 16

Events
Singles	men	women		boys	girls
Doubles	men	women	mixed	boys	girls
WC Singles	men	women	quad
WC Doubles	men	women	quad
Legends	−45	45+	women
- French Open

Kevin Krawietz and Andreas Mies defeated Jérémy Chardy and Fabrice Martin in the final, 6–2, 7–6^{(7–3)} to win the men's doubles tennis title at the 2019 French Open. They became the first all-German team in the Open Era to win a Grand Slam title, and the first since Gottfried von Cramm and Henner Henkel in 1937. The German pair also became the second team in the Open Era to win the men’s doubles title on its Roland Garros debut (after Jim Grabb and Patrick McEnroe in 1989).

Chardy and Martin were the fourth all-French team to reach the French Open men's doubles final, in seven years, since 2013. None of the four finalists had previously contested a major men's doubles final, and neither team was seeded for the tournament.

Pierre-Hugues Herbert and Nicolas Mahut were the defending champions, but Herbert chose not to participate this year. Mahut played alongside Jürgen Melzer, but lost in the second round to Krawietz and Mies.

== Seeds ==
1. (Poland) Łukasz Kubot / (Brazil) Marcelo Melo (third round)
2. (United Kingdom) Jamie Murray / (Brazil) Bruno Soares (first round)
3. (Colombia) Juan Sebastián Cabal / (Colombia) Robert Farah (semifinals)
4. (Austria) Oliver Marach / (Croatia) Mate Pavić (third round)
5. (Croatia) Nikola Mektić / (Croatia) Franko Škugor (first round)
6. (South Africa) Raven Klaasen / (New Zealand) Michael Venus (first round)
7. (United States) Bob Bryan / (United States) Mike Bryan (third round)
8. (Finland) Henri Kontinen / (Australia) John Peers (third round)

9. (Argentina) Máximo González / (Argentina) Horacio Zeballos (first round)
10. (Netherlands) Jean-Julien Rojer / (Romania) Horia Tecău (quarterfinals)
11. (United States) Rajeev Ram / (United Kingdom) Joe Salisbury (quarterfinals)
12. (Croatia) Ivan Dodig / (France) Édouard Roger-Vasselin (first round)
13. (France) Nicolas Mahut / (Austria) Jürgen Melzer (second round)
14. (Netherlands) Robin Haase / (Denmark) Frederik Nielsen (third round)
15. (Japan) Ben McLachlan / (Germany) Jan-Lennard Struff (first round)
16. (United States) Austin Krajicek / (New Zealand) Artem Sitak (first round)

Click on the seed number of a player to go to their draw section.

== Draw ==
Key

- Q = Qualifier
- WC = Wild card
- LL = Lucky loser
- Alt = Alternate
- ITF = ITF entry
- PR = Protected ranking
- SR = Special ranking
- SE = Special exempt
- JE = Junior exempt
- JR = Junior Accelerator Programme entrant
- CO = College Accelerator Programme entrant
- NG = Next Gen Accelerator Program entrant
- w/o = Walkover
- r = Retired
- d = Defaulted

=== Finals ===
Quarterfinals
(France) Jérémy Chardy (France) Fabrice Martin	6	7^{8}
11	(United States) Rajeev Ram (United Kingdom) Joe Salisbury	4	6^{6}
3	(Colombia) Juan Sebastián Cabal (Colombia) Robert Farah	6	6
(Kazakhstan) Mikhail Kukushkin (Belgium) Joran Vliegen	2	2
PR	(Serbia) Dušan Lajović (Serbia) Janko Tipsarević	1	7^{7}	6^{3}
(Germany) Kevin Krawietz (Germany) Andreas Mies	6	6^{4}	7^{7}
10	(Netherlands) Jean-Julien Rojer (Romania) Horia Tecău	4	4
(Argentina) Guido Pella (Argentina) Diego Schwartzman	6	6

Semifinals
(France) Jérémy Chardy (France) Fabrice Martin	7	6
3	(Colombia) Juan Sebastián Cabal (Colombia) Robert Farah	5	4
(Germany) Kevin Krawietz (Germany) Andreas Mies	7	6
(Argentina) Guido Pella (Argentina) Diego Schwartzman	5	3

Final
(France) Jérémy Chardy (France) Fabrice Martin	2	6^{3}
(Germany) Kevin Krawietz (Germany) Andreas Mies	6	7^{7}

=== Top half ===
==== Section 1 ====
First round
1	(Poland) Ł Kubot (Brazil) M Melo	6	7^{7}
(Spain) R Carballés Baena (Spain) J Munar	3	6^{2}
(Slovenia) A Bedene (Poland) H Hurkacz	3	2
(New Zealand) M Daniell (Netherlands) W Koolhof	6	6
(Netherlands) M Middelkoop (Germany) T Pütz	6	6
(Czech Republic) R Jebavý (Argentina) A Molteni	3	3
(France) J Chardy (France) F Martin	6	6
15	(Japan) B McLachlan (Germany) J-L Struff	3	3
11	(United States) R Ram (United Kingdom) J Salisbury	4
(Bosnia and Herzegovina) D Džumhur (Serbia) F Krajinović	5^{r}
(Australia) J Millman (Australia) J Thompson	1	4
WC	(France) E Couacaud (France) T Lamasine	6	6
(Hungary) M Fucsovics (Sweden) R Lindstedt	3	6	2
(Brazil) M Demoliner (India) D Sharan	6	4	6
(Argentina) L Mayer (Portugal) J Sousa	4	4
8	(Finland) H Kontinen (Australia) J Peers	6	6

Second round
1	(Poland) Ł Kubot (Brazil) M Melo	4	6	6
(New Zealand) M Daniell (Netherlands) W Koolhof	6	2	4
(Netherlands) M Middelkoop (Germany) T Pütz	6^{4}	2
(France) J Chardy (France) F Martin	7^{7}	6
11	(United States) R Ram (United Kingdom) J Salisbury	6	6^{4}	7
WC	(France) E Couacaud (France) T Lamasine	4	7^{7}	5
(Brazil) M Demoliner (India) D Sharan	3	4
8	(Finland) H Kontinen (Australia) J Peers	6	6

Third round
1	(Poland) Ł Kubot (Brazil) M Melo	7	2	3
(France) J Chardy (France) F Martin	5	6	6
11	(United States) R Ram (United Kingdom) J Salisbury	3	6	7^{7}
8	(Finland) H Kontinen (Australia) J Peers	6	3	6^{5}

Quarterfinals
(France) J Chardy (France) F Martin	6	7^{8}
11	(United States) R Ram (United Kingdom) J Salisbury	4	6^{6}

==== Section 2 ====
First round
3	(Colombia) JS Cabal (Colombia) R Farah	6	6
(Australia) M Ebden (Australia) J-P Smith	4	4
(India) L Paes (France) B Paire	6	6
(United Kingdom) D Inglot (Slovakia) M Kližan	4	4
(United States) S Johnson (United States) D Kudla	6	4	3
(United Kingdom) D Evans (United Kingdom) C Norrie	4	6	6
(El Salvador) M Arévalo (Mexico) MÁ Reyes-Varela	6	6^{4}	4
14	(Netherlands) R Haase (Denmark) F Nielsen	3	7^{7}	6
12	(Croatia) I Dodig (France) É Roger-Vasselin	6	1	5
(Serbia) M Kecmanović (Norway) C Ruud	1	6	7
(Spain) M Granollers (Spain) M López	6^{5}	0^{r}
Alt	(Argentina) F Delbonis (Argentina) G Durán	7^{7}	2
(Kazakhstan) M Kukushkin (Belgium) J Vliegen	6	3	6
(Moldova) R Albot (Tunisia) M Jaziri	3	6	4
(Uruguay) P Cuevas (Spain) F López	6	4	6
5	(Croatia) N Mektić (Croatia) F Škugor	4	6	3

Second round
3	(Colombia) JS Cabal (Colombia) R Farah	6	4	6
(India) L Paes (France) B Paire	0	6	3
(United Kingdom) D Evans (United Kingdom) C Norrie	6	2	3
14	(Netherlands) R Haase (Denmark) F Nielsen	2	6	6
(Serbia) M Kecmanović (Norway) C Ruud	0	6	2
Alt	(Argentina) F Delbonis (Argentina) G Durán	6	1	6
(Kazakhstan) M Kukushkin (Belgium) J Vliegen	6	3	6
(Uruguay) P Cuevas (Spain) F López	3	6	4

Third round
3	(Colombia) JS Cabal (Colombia) R Farah	6	6
14	(Netherlands) R Haase (Denmark) F Nielsen	3	4
Alt	(Argentina) F Delbonis (Argentina) G Durán	6	6^{5}	4
(Kazakhstan) M Kukushkin (Belgium) J Vliegen	2	7^{7}	6

Quarterfinals
3	(Colombia) JS Cabal (Colombia) R Farah	6	6
(Kazakhstan) M Kukushkin (Belgium) J Vliegen	2	2

=== Bottom half ===
==== Section 3 ====
First round
6	(South Africa) R Klaasen (New Zealand) M Venus	3	6^{4}
(India) R Bopanna (Romania) M Copil	6	7^{7}
(France) U Humbert (France) A Mannarino	6^{4}	3
WC	(France) B Bonzi (France) A Hoang	7^{7}	6
(Mexico) S González (Pakistan) A-u-H Qureshi	4	6	6^{1}
PR	(Serbia) D Lajović (Serbia) J Tipsarević	6	2	7^{7}
(Ukraine) D Molchanov (Slovakia) I Zelenay	7^{7}	4	6
9	(Argentina) M González (Argentina) H Zeballos	6^{3}	6	3
13	(France) N Mahut (Austria) J Melzer	6	6
(Italy) M Cecchinato (Italy) A Seppi	2	2
(Germany) K Krawietz (Germany) A Mies	7	6
WC	(France) M Guinard (France) A Rinderknech	5	4
WC	(France) E Benchetrit (France) G Blancaneaux	4	6	6
WC	(France) M Bourgue (France) J Eysseric	6	4	3
(India) J Nedunchezhiyan (Germany) M Zverev	6^{2}	4
4	(Austria) O Marach (Croatia) M Pavić	7^{7}	6

Second round
(India) R Bopanna (Romania) M Copil	6	6
WC	(France) B Bonzi (France) A Hoang	4	4
PR	(Serbia) D Lajović (Serbia) J Tipsarević	7	7^{7}
(Ukraine) D Molchanov (Slovakia) I Zelenay	5	6^{5}
13	(France) N Mahut (Austria) J Melzer	4	4
(Germany) K Krawietz (Germany) A Mies	6	6
WC	(France) E Benchetrit (France) G Blancaneaux	4	5
4	(Austria) O Marach (Croatia) M Pavić	6	7

Third round
(India) R Bopanna (Romania) M Copil	6	5	6^{8}
PR	(Serbia) D Lajović (Serbia) J Tipsarević	1	7	7^{10}
(Germany) K Krawietz (Germany) A Mies	5	6	7
4	(Austria) O Marach (Croatia) M Pavić	7	3	5

Quarterfinals
PR	(Serbia) D Lajović (Serbia) J Tipsarević	1	7^{7}	6^{3}
(Germany) K Krawietz (Germany) A Mies	6	6^{4}	7^{7}

==== Section 4 ====
First round
7	(United States) B Bryan (United States) M Bryan	5	6	6
(Spain) P Carreño Busta (Spain) G Granollers	7	2	3
(United Kingdom) L Bambridge (United Kingdom) J O'Mara	1	2
(United Kingdom) K Skupski (United Kingdom) N Skupski	6	6
(Lithuania) R Berankis (Japan) Y Nishioka	3
(United States) M McDonald (United States) R Opelka	0^{r}
(Chile) C Garín (Argentina) JI Londero	3	6^{4}
10	(Netherlands) J-J Rojer (Romania) H Tecău	6	7^{7}
16	(United States) A Krajicek (New Zealand) A Sitak	3	4
(Chinese Taipei) C-p Hsieh (Indonesia) C Rungkat	6	6
(Australia) A de Minaur (Spain) D Vega Hernández	4	6^{7}
WC	(France) G Barrère (France) Q Halys	6	7^{9}
(Argentina) G Pella (Argentina) D Schwartzman	4	6	7
WC	(France) H Gaston (France) C Tabur	6	3	5
(Italy) M Berrettini (Italy) L Sonego	4	7	7^{7}
2	(United Kingdom) J Murray (Brazil) B Soares	6	5	6^{4}

Second round
7	(United States) B Bryan (United States) M Bryan	7	7^{8}
(United Kingdom) K Skupski (United Kingdom) N Skupski	5	6^{6}
(Lithuania) R Berankis (Japan) Y Nishioka	3	3
10	(Netherlands) J-J Rojer (Romania) H Tecău	6	6
(Chinese Taipei) C-p Hsieh (Indonesia) C Rungkat	6^{6}	6	3
WC	(France) G Barrère (France) Q Halys	7^{8}	3	6
(Argentina) G Pella (Argentina) D Schwartzman	6	6
(Italy) M Berrettini (Italy) L Sonego	1	3

Third round
7	(United States) B Bryan (United States) M Bryan	3	6^{7}
10	(Netherlands) J-J Rojer (Romania) H Tecău	6	7^{9}
WC	(France) G Barrère (France) Q Halys	4	4
(Argentina) G Pella (Argentina) D Schwartzman	6	6

Quarterfinals
10	(Netherlands) J-J Rojer (Romania) H Tecău	4	4
(Argentina) G Pella (Argentina) D Schwartzman	6	6
