= 2019 French Open – Men's singles =

Men's singles
- 2019 French Open

Final
- Champion: (Spain) Rafael Nadal
- Runner-up: (Austria) Dominic Thiem
- Score: 6–3, 5–7, 6–1, 6–1

Details
- Draw: 128
- Seeds: 32

Events
Singles	men	women		boys	girls
Doubles	men	women	mixed	boys	girls
WC Singles	men	women	quad
WC Doubles	men	women	quad
Legends	−45	45+	women
- French Open

Two-time defending champion Rafael Nadal defeated Dominic Thiem in a rematch of the previous year's final, 6–3, 5–7, 6–1, 6–1 to win the men's singles tennis title at the 2019 French Open. It was his record-extending twelfth French Open title and 18th major title overall. With the win, Nadal surpassed Margaret Court's all-time record for the most singles titles by a player at the same major.

Novak Djokovic and Roger Federer were both attempting to complete double career Grand Slam, with Djokovic also in contention to achieve a second non-calendar-year Grand Slam, but both lost in the semifinals. This was Federer's first time playing the French Open in four years. Federer's third round match marked his 400th major match (345–55), making him the first man to play 400 grand slam matches. Federer was the oldest man to reach the fourth round at the French Open since Nicola Pietrangeli in 1972, and the oldest semifinalist since the 40-year-old Pancho Gonzales in 1968.

The first round match between Ivo Karlović (40 years and three months) and Feliciano López (37 years and 8 months) was the oldest French Open men's singles match in terms of combined ages in the Open Era. Karlović was the oldest man to compete in the singles tournament since István Gulyás in 1973. Stefanos Tsitsipas was the first Greek to reach the round of 16 since Lazaros Stalios in 1936.

For only the third time in the Open Era and the first time since the 1970 Australian Open, all of the top 10 seeds reached the round of 16 at a men's singles major. It was the first time since the 2013 Australian Open that the top four seeds (Djokovic, Nadal, Federer, and Thiem) all reached the semifinals of a major, and the first time since the 2012 French Open that the Big Three all reached the semifinals of a major.

This marked the final major appearance of 2009 US Open champion Juan Martín del Potro, who lost to Karen Khachanov in the fourth round. Del Potro would retire from tennis in 2022 due to recurring injuries.

== Seeds ==
All seedings per ATP rankings.

1. (Serbia) Novak Djokovic (semifinals)
2. (Spain) Rafael Nadal (champion)
3. (Switzerland) Roger Federer (semifinals)
4. (Austria) Dominic Thiem (final)
5. (Germany) Alexander Zverev (quarterfinals)
6. (Greece) Stefanos Tsitsipas (fourth round)
7. (Japan) Kei Nishikori (quarterfinals)
8. (Argentina) Juan Martín del Potro (fourth round)
9. (Italy) Fabio Fognini (fourth round)
10. (Russia) Karen Khachanov (quarterfinals)
11. (Croatia) Marin Čilić (second round)
12. (Russia) Daniil Medvedev (first round)
13. (Croatia) Borna Ćorić (third round)
14. (France) Gaël Monfils (fourth round)
15. (Georgia (country)) Nikoloz Basilashvili (first round)
16. (Italy) Marco Cecchinato (first round)

17. (Argentina) Diego Schwartzman (second round)
18. (Spain) Roberto Bautista Agut (third round)
19. (Argentina) Guido Pella (second round)
20. (Canada) Denis Shapovalov (first round)
21. (Australia) Alex de Minaur (second round)
22. (France) Lucas Pouille (second round)
23. (Spain) Fernando Verdasco (second round)
24. (Switzerland) Stan Wawrinka (quarterfinals)
25. (Canada) Félix Auger-Aliassime (withdrew)
26. (France) Gilles Simon (second round)
27. (Belgium) David Goffin (third round)
28. (United Kingdom) Kyle Edmund (second round, retired)
29. (Italy) Matteo Berrettini (second round)
30. (Serbia) Dušan Lajović (third round)
31. (Serbia) Laslo Đere (third round)
32. (United States) Frances Tiafoe (first round)

Click on the seed number of a player to go to their draw section.

== Draw ==
=== Key ===
- Q = Qualifier
- WC = Wild card
- LL = Lucky loser
- PR = Protected Ranking
- w/o = Walkover
- r = Retired
- d = Defaulted

=== Finals ===
Quarterfinals
1	(Serbia) Novak Djokovic	7	6	6
5	(Germany) Alexander Zverev	5	2	2
4	(Austria) Dominic Thiem	6	6	6
10	(Russia) Karen Khachanov	2	4	2
24	(Switzerland) Stan Wawrinka	6^{4}	6	6^{5}	4
3	(Switzerland) Roger Federer	7^{7}	4	7^{7}	6
7	(Japan) Kei Nishikori	1	1	3
2	(Spain) Rafael Nadal	6	6	6

Semifinals
1	(Serbia) Novak Djokovic	2	6	5	7	5
4	(Austria) Dominic Thiem	6	3	7	5	7
3	(Switzerland) Roger Federer	3	4	2
2	(Spain) Rafael Nadal	6	6	6

Final
4	(Austria) Dominic Thiem	3	7	1	1
2	(Spain) Rafael Nadal	6	5	6	6

=== Top half ===
==== Section 1 ====
First round
1	(Serbia) N Djokovic	6	6	6
(Poland) H Hurkacz	4	2	2
LL	(Switzerland) H Laaksonen	6	6	7^{7}
Q	(Spain) P Martínez	1	0	6^{4}
(Spain) J Munar	5	6	3	3
Q	(Italy) S Caruso	7	4	6	6
LL	(Ukraine) S Stakhovsky	3	3	4
26	(France) G Simon	6	6	6
20	(Canada) D Shapovalov	6^{1}	3	4
(Germany) J-L Struff	7^{7}	6	6
(Moldova) R Albot	7^{7}	7^{7}	3	6
Q	(United States) T Sandgren	6^{3}	6^{1}	6	1
(South Africa) L Harris	6	4	2	6	6
LL	(Czech Republic) L Rosol	1	6	6	1	2
(Slovenia) A Bedene	1	7^{7}	4	4
13	(Croatia) B Ćorić	6	6^{4}	6	6

Second round
1	(Serbia) N Djokovic	6	6	6
LL	(Switzerland) H Laaksonen	1	4	3
Q	(Italy) S Caruso	6	6	6
26	(France) G Simon	1	2	4
(Germany) J-L Struff	7^{7}	7^{7}	6^{4}	6
(Moldova) R Albot	6^{2}	6^{3}	7^{7}	2
(South Africa) L Harris	2	3	6^{2}
13	(Croatia) B Ćorić	6	6	7^{7}

Third round
1	(Serbia) N Djokovic	6	6	6
Q	(Italy) S Caruso	3	3	2
(Germany) J-L Struff	4	6	4	7^{7}	11
13	(Croatia) B Ćorić	6	1	6	6^{1}	9

Fourth round
1	(Serbia) N Djokovic	6	6	6
(Germany) J-L Struff	3	2	2

==== Section 2 ====
First round
9	(Italy) F Fognini	6	6	3	6
(Italy) A Seppi	3	0	6	3
Q	(Spain) G García López	1	6	3	2
(Argentina) F Delbonis	6	3	6	6
(United States) T Fritz	6	6	6
(Australia) B Tomic	1	4	1
(United States) S Johnson	3	4	2
18	(Spain) R Bautista Agut	6	6	6
30	(Serbia) D Lajović	6	6	6
Q	(Brazil) T Monteiro	3	4	4
(United Kingdom) C Norrie	3	0	2
Q	(France) E Benchetrit	6	6	6
Q	(Sweden) M Ymer	6	6	7^{7}
Q	(Slovenia) B Rola	0	3	6^{5}
(Australia) J Millman	6^{4}	3	6	7^{7}	3
5	(Germany) A Zverev	7^{7}	6	2	6^{5}	6

Second round
9	(Italy) F Fognini	6	3	6	6
(Argentina) F Delbonis	4	6	3	3
(United States) T Fritz	2	3	2
18	(Spain) R Bautista Agut	6	6	6
30	(Serbia) D Lajović	6	6	6
Q	(France) E Benchetrit	3	3	4
Q	(Sweden) M Ymer	1	3	6^{3}
5	(Germany) A Zverev	6	6	7^{7}

Third round
9	(Italy) F Fognini	7^{7}	6	4	6
18	(Spain) R Bautista Agut	6^{5}	4	6	1
30	(Serbia) D Lajović	4	2	6	6	2
5	(Germany) A Zverev	6	6	4	1	6

Fourth round
9	(Italy) F Fognini	6	2	2	6^{5}
5	(Germany) A Zverev	3	6	6	7^{7}

==== Section 3 ====
First round
4	(Austria) D Thiem	6	4	7^{7}	6
WC	(United States) T Paul	4	6	6^{5}	2
Q	(Germany) R Molleker	5	7^{7}	1	6^{2}
(Kazakhstan) A Bublik	7	6^{4}	6	7^{7}
WC	(France) M Janvier	4	4	2
(Uruguay) P Cuevas	6	6	6
(France) J Chardy	6^{1}	7	4	6	5
28	(United Kingdom) K Edmund	7^{7}	5	6	4	7
23	(Spain) F Verdasco	6	6^{4}	6	6
(United Kingdom) D Evans	3	7^{7}	3	2
WC	(France) A Hoang	6	0	7^{7}	6
(Bosnia and Herzegovina) D Džumhur	4	6	6^{5}	3
Q	(Italy) S Travaglia	7^{7}	3	6	2	2
(France) A Mannarino	6^{5}	6	3	6	6
(Japan) T Daniel	0	4	1
14	(France) G Monfils	6	6	6

Second round
4	(Austria) D Thiem	6	6^{6}	6	7
(Kazakhstan) A Bublik	3	7^{8}	3	5
(Uruguay) P Cuevas	7^{7}	6	2
28	(United Kingdom) K Edmund	6^{3}	3	1^{r}
23	(Spain) F Verdasco	4	6	6^{5}	5
WC	(France) A Hoang	6	3	7^{7}	7
(France) A Mannarino	3	4	4
14	(France) G Monfils	6	6	6

Third round
4	(Austria) D Thiem	6	4	6	7
(Uruguay) P Cuevas	3	6	2	5
WC	(France) A Hoang	3	2	3
14	(France) G Monfils	6	6	6

Fourth round
4	(Austria) D Thiem	6	6	6
14	(France) G Monfils	4	4	2

==== Section 4 ====
First round
10	(Russia) K Khachanov	6	6	6
PR	(Germany) C-M Stebe	1	1	4
WC	(France) G Barrère	6	5	7	6
(Australia) M Ebden	3	7	5	1
(Slovakia) M Kližan	3	5	6	6	6
(Kazakhstan) M Kukushkin	6	7	4	2	3
Q	(Italy) S Bolelli	3	4	5
22	(France) L Pouille	6	6	7
LL	(Spain) A Davidovich Fokina	3	2	6^{3}
(Australia) J Thompson	6	6	7^{7}
(Croatia) I Karlović	7^{7}	7	6^{7}	7
(Spain) F López	6^{4}	5	7^{9}	5
(Japan) Y Nishioka	6^{7}	6	4	6	6
(United States) M McDonald	7^{9}	0	6	2	3
(Chile) N Jarry	6	2	1	4
8	(Argentina) JM del Potro	3	6	6	6

Second round
10	(Russia) K Khachanov	6	7^{8}	0	7
WC	(France) G Barrère	3	6^{6}	6	5
(Slovakia) M Kližan	7^{7}	2	6	3	9
22	(France) L Pouille	6^{4}	6	3	6	7
(Australia) J Thompson	6	6	6^{2}	6
(Croatia) I Karlović	3	4	7^{7}	3
(Japan) Y Nishioka	7	4	2	7^{7}	2
8	(Argentina) JM del Potro	5	6	6	6^{5}	6

Third round
10	(Russia) K Khachanov	6	6	6
(Slovakia) M Kližan	1	4	3
(Australia) J Thompson	4	4	0
8	(Argentina) JM del Potro	6	6	6

Fourth round
10	(Russia) K Khachanov	7	6	3	6
8	(Argentina) JM del Potro	5	3	6	3

=== Bottom half ===
==== Section 5 ====
First round
6	(Greece) S Tsitsipas	6	6	7^{7}
(Germany) M Marterer	2	2	6^{4}
(India) P Gunneswaran	1	3	1
(Bolivia) H Dellien	6	6	6
(Spain) R Carballés Baena	6	6	6
Q	(France) A Müller	4	4	2
(Serbia) F Krajinović	6	4	6	3	6
32	(United States) F Tiafoe	2	6	3	6	0
24	(Switzerland) S Wawrinka	6	6^{3}	6	6
PR	(Slovakia) J Kovalík	1	7^{7}	2	3
(United States) R Opelka	6^{0}	5	6^{7}
(Chile) C Garín	7^{7}	7	7^{9}
PR	(Serbia) J Tipsarević	3	0	6	7^{7}	4
(Bulgaria) G Dimitrov	6	6	3	6^{4}	6
(Italy) T Fabbiano	3	5	1
11	(Croatia) M Čilić	6	7	6

Second round
6	(Greece) S Tsitsipas	4	6	6	7
(Bolivia) H Dellien	6	0	3	5
(Spain) R Carballés Baena	4	4	7^{7}	6	6
(Serbia) F Krajinović	6	6	6^{1}	3	8
24	(Switzerland) S Wawrinka	6	6	6
(Chile) C Garín	1	4	0
(Bulgaria) G Dimitrov	6^{3}	6	4	7^{7}	6
11	(Croatia) M Čilić	7^{7}	4	6	6^{2}	3

Third round
6	(Greece) S Tsitsipas	7	6	6^{5}	7^{8}
(Serbia) F Krajinović	5	3	7^{7}	6^{6}
24	(Switzerland) S Wawrinka	7^{7}	7^{7}	7^{10}
(Bulgaria) G Dimitrov	6^{5}	6^{4}	6^{8}

Fourth round
6	(Greece) S Tsitsipas	6^{6}	7	4	6	6
24	(Switzerland) S Wawrinka	7^{8}	5	6	3	8

==== Section 6 ====
First round
16	(Italy) M Cecchinato	6	7^{8}	4	2	4
WC	(France) N Mahut	2	6^{6}	6	6	6
(Netherlands) R Haase	4	4	7^{7}	1
(Germany) P Kohlschreiber	6	6	6^{5}	6
(Czech Republic) J Veselý	6^{3}	3	0
(Argentina) L Mayer	7^{7}	6	6
(Hungary) M Fucsovics	3	6	6^{7}	6	2
17	(Argentina) D Schwartzman	6	3	7^{9}	2	6
29	(Italy) M Berrettini	6^{3}	6	6	6
(Spain) P Andújar	7^{7}	4	4	2
(Norway) C Ruud	6	7^{7}	6
(Latvia) E Gulbis	2	6^{2}	0
(Tunisia) M Jaziri	3	1	6	0
LL	(Germany) O Otte	6	6	4	6
(Italy) L Sonego	2	4	4
3	(Switzerland) R Federer	6	6	6

Second round
WC	(France) N Mahut	6	6	6
(Germany) P Kohlschreiber	3	3	3
(Argentina) L Mayer	4	6	6	7
17	(Argentina) D Schwartzman	6	3	4	5
29	(Italy) M Berrettini	4	5	3
(Norway) C Ruud	6	7	6
LL	(Germany) O Otte	4	3	4
3	(Switzerland) R Federer	6	6	6

Third round
WC	(France) N Mahut	6	6^{3}	4	6^{3}
(Argentina) L Mayer	3	7^{7}	6	7^{7}
(Norway) C Ruud	3	1	6^{8}
3	(Switzerland) R Federer	6	6	7^{10}

Fourth round
(Argentina) L Mayer	2	3	3
3	(Switzerland) R Federer	6	6	6

==== Section 7 ====
First round
7	(Japan) K Nishikori	6	6	6
WC	(France) Q Halys	2	3	4
PR	(France) J-W Tsonga	7^{7}	6	4	6
(Germany) P Gojowczyk	6^{4}	1	6	3
WC	(Australia) A Popyrin	3	6	7^{12}	6
(France) U Humbert	6	3	6^{10}	3
(Spain) A Ramos Viñolas	3	2	6^{2}
31	(Serbia) L Đere	6	6	7^{7}
21	(Australia) A de Minaur	6	6	6
(United States) B Klahn	1	4	4
(Spain) P Carreño Busta	6	6	6
(Portugal) J Sousa	3	1	2
(France) B Paire	6	6^{5}	6	6
(Romania) M Copil	4	7^{7}	0	1
(France) P-H Herbert	4	4	6	6	7
12	(Russia) D Medvedev	6	6	3	2	5

Second round
7	(Japan) K Nishikori	4	6	6	6
PR	(France) J-W Tsonga	6	4	4	4
WC	(Australia) A Popyrin	4	6^{4}	4
31	(Serbia) L Đere	6	7^{7}	6
21	(Australia) A de Minaur	3	1	1
(Spain) P Carreño Busta	6	6	6
(France) B Paire	6	6	5	6^{6}	11
(France) P-H Herbert	2	2	7	7^{8}	9

Third round
7	(Japan) K Nishikori	6	6^{6}	6	4	8
31	(Serbia) L Đere	4	7^{8}	3	6	6
(Spain) P Carreño Busta	2	6	6^{1}	0^{r}
(France) B Paire	6	4	7^{7}	0

Fourth round
7	(Japan) K Nishikori	6	6^{8}	6	6^{8}	7
(France) B Paire	2	7^{10}	2	7^{10}	5

==== Section 8 ====
First round
15	(Georgia (country)) N Basilashvili	4	1	3
(Argentina) JI Londero	6	6	6
(Germany) M Zverev	3	4	3
(France) R Gasquet	6	6	6
Q	(Russia) A Vatutin	4	6^{6}	4
WC	(France) C Moutet	6	7^{8}	6
(Argentina) G Andreozzi	6^{2}	4	6	1
19	(Argentina) G Pella	7^{7}	6	1	6
27	(Belgium) D Goffin	6	6	6
(Lithuania) R Berankis	0	2	2
(Serbia) M Kecmanović	6	6^{7}	5	6	6
(United States) D Kudla	0	7^{9}	7	3	4
Q	(Germany) Y Maden	7^{7}	7	6
Q	(Belgium) K Coppejans	6^{0}	5	3
Q	(Germany) Y Hanfmann	2	1	3
2	(Spain) R Nadal	6	6	6

Second round
(Argentina) JI Londero	6	3	6	6
(France) R Gasquet	2	6	3	4
WC	(France) C Moutet	6	6	2	7
19	(Argentina) G Pella	3	1	6	5
27	(Belgium) D Goffin	6	6	6
(Serbia) M Kecmanović	2	4	3
Q	(Germany) Y Maden	1	2	4
2	(Spain) R Nadal	6	6	6

Third round
(Argentina) JI Londero	2	6	6	5	6
WC	(France) C Moutet	6	3	4	7	4
27	(Belgium) D Goffin	1	3	6	3
2	(Spain) R Nadal	6	6	4	6

Fourth round
(Argentina) JI Londero	2	3	3
2	(Spain) R Nadal	6	6	6

== Championship match ratings ==
1.785 million on NBC, in the USA

Preceded by 2019 Australian Open – Men's singles	Grand Slam men's singles	Succeeded by 2019 Wimbledon Championships – Men's singles
