= 1987 Volvo U.S. National Indoor =

- Date: February 9–15
- Edition: 17th
- Category: Grand Prix
- Draw: 48S / 24D
- Prize money: $250,000
- Surface: Hard / indoor
- Location: Memphis, TN, U.S.
- Venue: Racquet Club of Memphis

Champions

Singles
- (Sweden) Stefan Edberg

Doubles
- (Sweden) Anders Järryd / (Sweden) Jonas Svensson
- U.S. National Indoor Championships

The 1987 Volvo U.S. National Indoor was a men's tennis tournament played on indoor hard courts at the Racquet Club of Memphis in Memphis, Tennessee in the United States that was part of the 1987 Nabisco Grand Prix. It was the 17th edition of the tournament was held from February 9 through February 15, 1987. First-seeded Stefan Edberg won the singles title after his opponent in the final, second-seeded Jimmy Connors retired in the second set with a knee injury.

== Finals ==
=== Singles ===
(Sweden) Stefan Edberg defeated (United States) Jimmy Connors 6–3, 2–1, ret.

- It was Edberg's 2nd singles title of the year and the 10th of his career.

=== Doubles ===
(Sweden) Anders Järryd / (Sweden) Jonas Svensson defeated (Spain) Sergio Casal / (Spain) Emilio Sánchez 6–4, 6–2
