= Mikael Pernfors =

Swedish tennis player (born 1963)

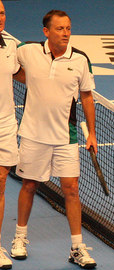
- Country (sports): Sweden
- Residence: Vero Beach, Florida, U.S.
- Born: 16 July 1963 (age 63) Malmö, Sweden
- Height: 1.73 m (5 ft 8 in)
- Turned pro: 1985
- Retired: 1996
- Plays: Right-handed (two-handed backhand)
- College: Georgia
- Prize money: $1,363,793

Singles
- Career record: 140–114 (55.1%)
- Career titles: 3
- Highest ranking: No. 10 (22 September 1986)

Grand Slam singles results
- Australian Open: QF (1990)
- French Open: F (1986)
- Wimbledon: 4R (1986, 1987)
- US Open: 4R (1989)

Other tournaments
- WCT Finals: SF (1989)

Doubles
- Career record: 41–47 (46.6%)
- Career titles: 1
- Highest ranking: No. 32 (11 July 1988)

Mikael Pernfors (Swedish pronunciation: [ˈmîːkaɛl ˈpæ̂ːɳfɔʂ]; born 16 July 1963) is a former professional tennis player from Sweden. He reached the men's singles final at the French Open in 1986, and won the 1993 Canadian Open in Montreal.

== Career ==
Pernfors played a topspin-heavy baseline game with a double-handed backhand, like his countrymen Björn Borg and Mats Wilander, but he lacked their consistency and relied on a crowd-pleasing game full of variety, liberally employing the drop shot and the topspin lob.

Before turning professional, Pernfors played tennis for two years at Seminole Community College, then the University of Georgia in the United States and became the first player since Dennis Ralston two decades earlier to win back-to-back NCAA singles titles in 1984 and 1985.

In 1986 Pernfors reached his first (and only) Grand Slam singles final at the French Open. He defeated Olivier Delaître, Stefan Edberg, Robert Seguso, Martín Jaite, Boris Becker in the quarterfinals and Henri Leconte in the semifinals. In the final, he lost in straight sets to then world No. 1, Ivan Lendl.

Pernfors played for Sweden in the final of the Davis Cup in 1986. He won one singles rubber against Paul McNamee in straight sets and lost the other to Pat Cash in five sets – after winning the first two – as Australia beat Sweden 3–2. The following year at Wimbledon he again lost a two-set lead, falling to Jimmy Connors in five sets after having led 6–1, 6–1, 4–1, and afterwards 3–0 in the fourth set.

In 1988, Pernfors won his first top-level singles title at Los Angeles, defeating Andre Agassi in the final. His second came just a month later in Scottsdale, Arizona.

In the fourth round of the Australian Open in 1990, Pernfors faced John McEnroe during a match in which McEnroe became the first player to be disqualified under a new Code of Conduct that had recently been introduced in tennis. McEnroe was apparently unaware that under the new rules three code violations would result in disqualification (instead of the previous four), and Pernfors won the match by default after McEnroe attempted to intimidate a lineswoman, smashed a racket, and then verbally abused the umpire.

Injuries limited Pernfors' performances on the tour in the first few years of the 1990s. He came back strongly in 1993 to win the most significant title of his career at the Canadian Open (part of the Tennis Masters Series), where he defeated Todd Martin in the final. Pernfors became the oldest player to lift a Masters title when the then 30-year-old Swede lifted the third and final singles trophy of his career. He also was the lowest ranked player to triumph at a Masters, moving 58 positions up to world No. 37 after the tournament. A few weeks later, he pushed Wilander to five sets in the second round of the US Open before losing.

Pernfors was the recipient of the ATP Tour's Most Improved Player award in 1986, and its Comeback Player of the Year award in 1993.

Pernfors retired from the professional tour in 1996 after a career in which he won three top-level singles and one doubles title. His career-high singles ranking was world No. 10 in 1986. His career prize-money earnings totalled $1,363,793. In addition to his victories over Becker, Agassi, McEnroe and Martin, Pernfors holds victories over Wilander, Pete Sampras, Stefan Edberg, Jim Courier, Thomas Muster, Sergi Bruguera and Michael Stich.

Since retiring from the tour, Pernfors has been a regular competitor in seniors events.

== Significant finals ==
=== Grand Slam finals ===
==== Singles: 1 (0–1) ====
| Result | Date | Championship | Surface | Opponent | Score |
|---|---|---|---|---|---|
| Loss | 1986 | French Open | Clay | (Czechoslovakia) Ivan Lendl | 3–6, 2–6, 4–6 |

=== Masters Series finals ===
==== Singles: 1 (1–0) ====
| Result | Date | Tournament | Surface | Opponent | Score |
|---|---|---|---|---|---|
| Win | 1993 | Montreal, Canada | Hard | (United States) Todd Martin | 2–6, 6–2, 7–5 |

== Career finals ==
=== Singles: 5 (3 titles, 2 runner-ups) ===
Legend
Grand Slam (0–1)
Masters Cup (0–0)
ATP Masters Series (1–0)
ATP Tour (2–1)

| Result | W–L | Date | Tournament | Surface | Opponent | Score |
|---|---|---|---|---|---|---|
| Loss | 0–1 | May 1986 | French Open, Paris | Clay | (Czechoslovakia) Ivan Lendl | 3–6, 2–6, 4–6 |
| Loss | 0–2 | Feb 1988 | Memphis, US | Hard (i) | (United States) Andre Agassi | 4–6, 4–6, 5–7 |
| Win | 1–2 | Sep 1988 | Los Angeles, US | Hard | (United States) Andre Agassi | 6–2, 7–5 |
| Win | 2–2 | Oct 1988 | Scottsdale, US | Hard | (United States) Glenn Layendecker | 6–2, 6–4 |
| Win | 3–2 | Jul 1993 | Montreal, Canada | Hard | (United States) Todd Martin | 2–6, 6–2, 7–5 |

=== Doubles: 3 (1 title, 2 runner-ups) ===
Legend
Grand Slam (0–0)
Masters Cup (0–0)
ATP Masters Series (0–0)
ATP Tour (1–2)

| Result | W–L | Date | Tournament | Surface | Partner | Opponents | Score |
|---|---|---|---|---|---|---|---|
| Loss | 0–1 | Jul 1987 | Stuttgart, West Germany | Clay | (Sweden) Magnus Tideman | (United States) Rick Leach (United States) Tim Pawsat | 3–6, 4–6 |
| Loss | 0–2 | Feb 1988 | Memphis, US | Hard (i) | (Sweden) Peter Lundgren | (United States) Kevin Curren (United States) David Pate | 2–6, 2–6 |
| Win | 1–2 | May 1989 | Charleston, US | Clay | (Sweden) Tobias Svantesson | (Mexico) Agustín Moreno (Peru) Jaime Yzaga | 6–4, 4–6, 7–5 |

== Singles performance timeline ==
Key
| W | F | SF | QF | #R | RR | Q# | DNQ | A | NH |

(W) winner; (F) finalist; (SF) semifinalist; (QF) quarterfinalist; (#R) rounds 4, 3, 2, 1; (RR) round-robin stage; (Q#) qualification round; (DNQ) did not qualify; (A) absent; (NH) not held; (SR) strike rate (events won / competed); (W–L) win–loss record.

| Tournament | 1984 | 1985 | 1986 | 1987 | 1988 | 1989 | 1990 | 1991 | 1992 | 1993 | 1994 | SR | W–L |
|---|---|---|---|---|---|---|---|---|---|---|---|---|---|
Grand Slam tournaments
| Australian Open | A | A | NH | A | A | 3R | QF | A | A | A | 1R | 0 / 3 | 6–3 |
| French Open | A | A | F | 1R | 1R | 1R | A | A | A | A | 1R | 0 / 5 | 6–5 |
| Wimbledon | A | A | 4R | 4R | A | 2R | A | A | A | A | A | 0 / 3 | 7–3 |
| US Open | 1R | 1R | 2R | 1R | 3R | 4R | 1R | 1R | 1R | 2R | A | 0 / 10 | 7–10 |
| Win–loss | 0–1 | 0–1 | 10–3 | 3–3 | 2–2 | 6–4 | 4–2 | 0–1 | 0–1 | 1–1 | 0–2 | 0 / 21 | 26–21 |
ATP Masters Series
| Indian Wells | Tournaments were not Masters Series events before 1990 | | | | | | A | A | A | Q1 | A | 0 / 0 | 0–0 |
| Miami | Tournaments were not Masters Series events before 1990 | | | | | | 1R | A | A | 3R | A | 0 / 2 | 2–2 |
| Monte Carlo | Tournaments were not Masters Series events before 1990 | | | | | | A | A | A | A | A | 0 / 0 | 0–0 |
| Rome | Tournaments were not Masters Series events before 1990 | | | | | | A | A | A | A | A | 0 / 0 | 0–0 |
| Hamburg | Tournaments were not Masters Series events before 1990 | | | | | | A | A | A | A | A | 0 / 0 | 0–0 |
| Canada | Tournaments were not Masters Series events before 1990 | | | | | | A | A | A | W | A | 1 / 1 | 6–0 |
| Cincinnati | Tournaments were not Masters Series events before 1990 | | | | | | A | 2R | A | 1R | A | 0 / 2 | 1–2 |
| Stockholm | Tournaments were not Masters Series events before 1990 | | | | | | A | A | A | 2R | A | 0 / 1 | 1–1 |
| Paris | Tournaments were not Masters Series events before 1990 | | | | | | A | A | A | A | A | 0 / 0 | 0–0 |
| Win–loss | Tournaments were not Masters Series events before 1990 | | | | | | 0–1 | 1–1 | 0–0 | 9–3 | 0–0 | 1 / 6 | 10–5 |
| Year-end ranking | 434 | 165 | 12 | 33 | 19 | 48 | 175 | 240 | 234 | 29 | 940 | | |

Awards
| Preceded by Boris Becker | ATP Most Improved Player; 1986 | Succeeded by Peter Lundgren |
