= Allandale (Toronto) =

Historic house in Toronto, Canada

Coordinates: 43.658878°N 79.370947°W

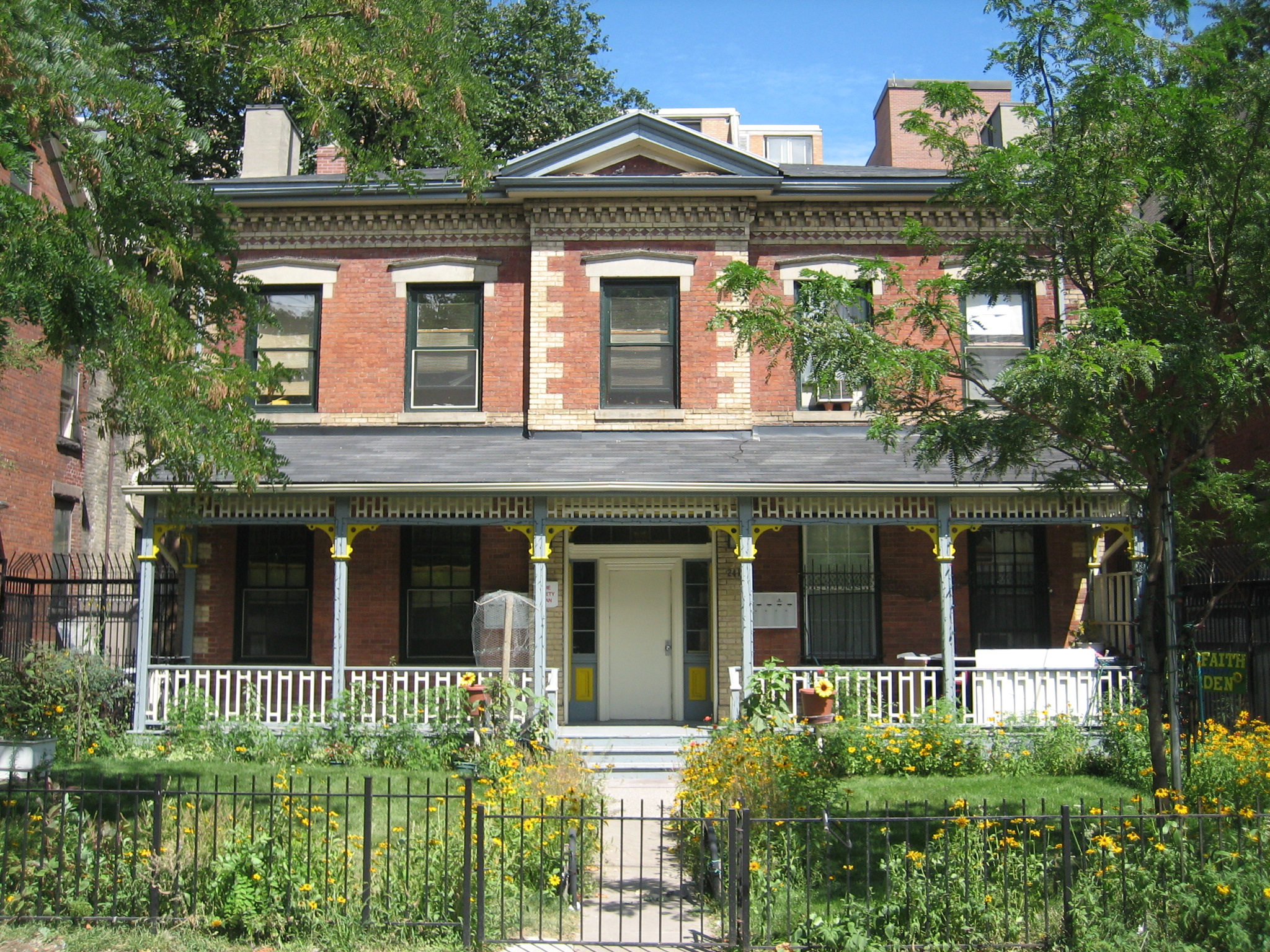
Allandale

Allandale is a historic house in Toronto, Ontario, Canada. It was built by prominent brewer Enoch Turner in 1856 on Sherbourne Street just north of Dundas St. When it was built this was the fringe of the town, and the house is rural in appearance with a style common to rural Ontario in this period. The house was named after William Allan, who had owned the large Moss Park estate upon which the house was built.

In the years after the house was built the Sherbourne/Jarvis area became home to the city's elite, and Allandale was dwarfed by several mansions in the area. The area changed again dramatically in the 20th century, becoming one of the poorest in Toronto; home to a working class and transient population with the old houses left in poor condition. One of Allandale's last occupants was I.F. Hellmuth, who founded the Toronto Lawn Tennis Club in 1874, and in 1881 won the first Rogers Cup. He died there in 1944. In the 1960s Allandale was slated for demolition, as it and its neighbours were to be replaced with a public housing project, similar to the nearby Moss Park. Public protests halted the demolition in 1973. Instead a new form of public housing was tried by architects Jack Diamond and Barton Myers. The Sherbourne Lanes project integrated Allandale with several neighbouring Victorian structures and modern infills to preserve the character of the neighbourhood while a creating modern public housing complex.
