= 1977 Rothmans Canadian Open =

- Date: August 15–22
- Edition: 88th
- Surface: Clay / outdoor
- Location: Toronto, Ontario, Canada
- Venue: National Tennis Centre

Champions

Men's singles
- (United States) Jeff Borowiak

Women's singles
- (Czechoslovakia) Regina Maršíková

Men's doubles
- (South Africa) Bob Hewitt / (Mexico) Raúl Ramírez

Women's doubles
- (South Africa) Delina Ann Boshoff / (South Africa) Ilana Kloss
- Canadian Open

The 1977 Rothmans Canadian Open was a tennis tournament played on outdoor clay courts at the National Tennis Centre in Toronto in Canada that was part of the 1977 Colgate-Palmolive Grand Prix and of the 1977 WTA Tour. The tournament was held from August 15 through August 22, 1977.

== Finals ==
=== Men's singles ===
(United States) Jeff Borowiak defeated (Chile) Jaime Fillol 6–0, 6–1

- It was Borowiak's 3rd title of the year and the 8th of his career.

=== Women's singles ===
(Czechoslovakia) Regina Maršíková defeated (South Africa) Marise Kruger 6–4, 4–6, 6–2

- It was Maršíková's 1st title of the year and the 1st of her career.

=== Men's doubles ===
(South Africa) Bob Hewitt / (Mexico) Raúl Ramírez defeated (United States) Fred McNair / (United States) Sherwood Stewart 6–4, 3–6, 6–2

- It was Hewitt's 10th title of the year and the 40th of his career. It was Ramírez's 6th title of the year and the 53rd of his career.

=== Women's doubles ===
(South Africa) Delina Ann Boshoff / (South Africa) Ilana Kloss defeated (United States) Rosemary Casals / (Australia) Evonne Goolagong Cawley 6–2, 6–3

- It was Boshoff's 1st title of the year and the 1st of her career. It was Kloss' 1st title of the year and the 1st of her career.
