= Tennis on Hughes =

Television series

Tennis on Hughes was the de facto name of a series of syndicated professional tennis telecasts, produced by the Hughes Television Network. The telecasts were sold to commercial stations on an individual market basis by Taft Broadcasting.

In 1978, Hughes televised eight tournaments, all slotted for 6 to 8 p.m. on Saturdays and 5 to 7 p.m. on Sundays (all Eastern time). The announcers for these broadcasts were Bud Collins and Donald Dell.

The tournaments were the following:

- Australian Open
- Canadian Open
- French Open
- Italian Open
- US Open
- U.S. Pro Championships
- Washington Star International
