= 1975 Rothmans Canadian Open =

- Date: August 11–17
- Edition: 86th
- Surface: Clay / outdoor
- Location: Toronto, Ontario, Canada
- Venue: Toronto Lawn Tennis Club

Champions

Men's singles
- (Spain) Manuel Orantes

Women's singles
- (United States) Marcie Louie

Men's doubles
- (South Africa) Cliff Drysdale / (South Africa) Raymond Moore

Women's doubles
- (United States) Julie Anthony / (Australia) Margaret Court
- Canadian Open

The 1975 Rothmans Canadian Open was a tennis tournament played on outdoor clay courts at the Toronto Lawn Tennis Club in Toronto in Canada that was part of the 1975 Commercial Union Assurance Grand Prix and of the 1975 WTA Tour. The tournament was held from August 11 through August 17, 1975.

== Finals ==
=== Men's singles ===
(Spain) Manuel Orantes defeated (Romania) Ilie Năstase 7–6^{(7–4)}, 6–0, 6–1

- It was Orantes' 10th title of the year and the 35th of his career.

=== Women's singles ===
(United States) Marcie Louie defeated (United States) Laura DuPont 6–1, 4–6, 6–4

- It was Louie's 1st title of the year and the 1st of her career.

=== Men's doubles ===
(South Africa) Cliff Drysdale / (South Africa) Raymond Moore defeated (Czechoslovakia) Jan Kodeš / (Romania) Ilie Năstase 6–4, 5–7, 7–6

- It was Drysdale's 2nd title of the year and the 9th of his career. It was Moore's only title of the year and the 3rd of his career.

=== Women's doubles ===
(United States) Julie Anthony / (Australia) Margaret Court defeated (United States) JoAnne Russell / (United States) Jane Stratton 6–2, 6–4

- It was Anthony's 1st title of the year and the 1st of her career. It was Court's 1st title of the year and the 133rd of her career.
