= 1969 Canadian Open (tennis) =

- Date: August 9–15 (men); August 16–23 (women)
- Edition: 80th
- Prize money: $9,000
- Surface: Clay / outdoor
- Location: Toronto, Ontario, Canada
- Venue: Toronto Lawn Tennis Club

Champions

Men's singles
- (United States) Cliff Richey

Women's singles
- (Canada) Faye Urban

Men's doubles
- (United States) Ron Holmberg / (Australia) John Newcombe

Women's doubles
- (Canada) Vicki Berner / (Canada) Faye Urban
- Canadian Open

The 1969 Canadian Open was a tennis tournament played on outdoor clay courts at the Toronto Lawn Tennis Club in Toronto in Canada. The men's tournament was held from August 9 through August 15, 1969, while the women's tournament was played from August 16 through August 23, 1969.

== Finals ==
=== Men's singles ===
(United States) Cliff Richey defeated (United States) Butch Buchholz 6–4, 5–7, 6–4, 6–0

- It was Richey's 2nd professional title of the year and the 2nd of his career.

=== Women's singles ===
(Canada) Faye Urban defeated (Canada) Vicki Berner 6–2, 6–0

- It was Urban's 1st title of the year and the 1st of her career.

=== Men's doubles ===
(United States) Ron Holmberg / (Australia) John Newcombe defeated (United States) Butch Buchholz / (South Africa) Raymond Moore 6–3, 6–4

- It was Holmberg's 1st professional title of the year and the 1st of his career. It was Newcombe's 6th title of the year and the 9th of his professional career.

=== Women's doubles ===
(Canada) Vicki Berner / (Canada) Faye Urban defeated (Canada) Jane O'Hara Wood / (Canada) Vivienne Strong 6–1, 6–1

- It was Nunns' 1st title of the year and the 1st of her career. It was Urban's 2nd title of the year and the 2nd of her career.
