= 1971 Rothmans Canadian Open =

- Date: August 9–16
- Edition: 82nd
- Category: WCT
- Surface: Clay / outdoor
- Location: Toronto, Ontario, Canada
- Venue: Toronto Lawn Tennis Club

Champions

Men's singles
- (Australia) John Newcombe

Women's singles
- (France) Françoise Dürr

Men's doubles
- (Netherlands) Tom Okker / (United States) Marty Riessen

Women's doubles
- (United States) Rosemary Casals / (France) Françoise Dürr
- Canadian Open

The 1971 Rothmans Canadian Open was a tennis tournament played on outdoor clay courts at the Toronto Lawn Tennis Club in Toronto in Canada that was part of the 1971 World Championship Tennis circuit. The tournament was held from August 9 through August 16, 1971. John Newcombe and Françoise Dürr won the singles titles.

== Finals ==
=== Men's singles ===
(Australia) John Newcombe defeated (Netherlands) Tom Okker 7–6, 3–6, 6–2, 7–6

- It was Newcombe's 10th professional title of the year and the 24th of his career.

=== Women's singles ===
(France) Françoise Dürr defeated (Australia) Evonne Goolagong 6–4, 6–2

- It was Durr's 6th title of the year and the 33rd of her career.

=== Men's doubles ===
(Netherlands) Tom Okker / (United States) Marty Riessen defeated (United States) Arthur Ashe / (United States) Dennis Ralston 6–3, 6–3, 6–1

- It was Okker's 7th title of the year and the 20th of his career. It was Riessen's 7th title of the year and the 16th of his career.

=== Women's doubles ===
(United States) Rosemary Casals / (France) Françoise Dürr defeated (Australia) Lesley Turner Bowrey / (Australia) Evonne Goolagong 6–3, 6–2

- It was Casals' 3rd title of the year and the 17th of her career. It was Durr's 7th title of the year and the 34th of her career.
