= 1980 Player's Canadian Open =

- Date: August 11–17
- Edition: 91st
- Surface: Hard / outdoor
- Location: Toronto, Ontario, Canada
- Venue: National Tennis Centre

Champions

Men's singles
- (Czechoslovakia) Ivan Lendl

Women's singles
- (United States) Chris Evert-Lloyd

Men's doubles
- (United States) Bruce Manson / (United States) Brian Teacher

Women's doubles
- (United States) Andrea Jaeger / (Czechoslovakia) Regina Maršíková
- Canadian Open

The 1980 Player's International Canadian Open was a tennis tournament played on outdoor hard courts at the National Tennis Centre in Toronto in Canada that was part of the 1980 Volvo Grand Prix and of the 1980 WTA Tour. It was the 91st edition of the tournament and was held from August 11 through August 17, 1980.

== Finals ==
=== Men's singles ===
(Czechoslovakia) Ivan Lendl defeated (Sweden) Björn Borg 4–6, 5–4 retired

- It was Lendl's 2nd singles title of the year and of his career.

=== Women's singles ===
(United States) Chris Evert-Lloyd defeated (Romania) Virginia Ruzici 6–3, 6–1

- It was Evert-Lloyd's 4th title of the year and the 101st of her career.

=== Men's doubles ===
(United States) Bruce Manson / (United States) Brian Teacher defeated (Switzerland) Heinz Günthardt / (United States) Sandy Mayer 6–3, 3–6, 6–4

- It was Manson's 1st title of the year and the 3rd of his career. It was Teacher's 3rd title of the year and the 8th of his career.

=== Women's doubles ===
(United States) Andrea Jaeger / (Czechoslovakia) Regina Maršíková defeated (United States) Ann Kiyomura / (United States) Betsy Nagelsen 6–1, 6–3

- It was Jaeger's 1st title of the year and the 1st of her career. It was Maršíková's 1st title of the year and the 6th of her career.
