= I. F. Hellmuth =

Canadian tennis player

Isidore Frederick Hellmuth
- Country (sports): Canada
- Residence: Canada
- Born: February 21, 1854; Sherbrooke, Canada East
- Died: February 17, 1944 (aged 89); Allandale House, Toronto, Canada
- Height: 6 ft 4 in (193 cm)

Singles
- Career record: 20/8
- Career titles: 1

Doubles
- Career titles: 1 ATP
- Last updated on: July 25, 2016.

Isidore Frederick (I.F.) Hellmuth (1854–1944) was the first champion of what became the Canadian National Tennis Championship, now known as the Canadian Open or the Rogers Cup. He was also a three-time runner-up as well as one-time doubles champion.

== Life and career ==
Born in Sherbrooke, Quebec in 1854, he was the son of Isaac Hellmuth, who became Bishop of Huron. After an early education at London, Ontario, he studied at Trinity College, Cambridge and trained for the English bar at the Inner Temple. Returning to Canada, he became a barrister at Toronto. He was a Life Bencher of the Law Society of Upper Canada.

In 1880, he married Harriet Emily Gamble (b. 1847), granddaughter of Henry John Boulton. One of his junior partners, John Meredith (who was to die in WWI), son of Sir William Ralph Meredith, married his daughter, Miriam (b:16 Feb 1881). Their daughter Diana (b. Feb 1910) was married to Marcel Provost (who was also killed in WWII in France in 1945) then Edward Curtis.

In 1874, Hellmuth may have built a court at 148 Front Street, which was the future site of the Toronto Lawn Tennis Club that was founded in 1876. Though not an original member, Hellmuth joined the club soon after returning to Canada around 1879. He was runner-up at an unofficial United States national tennis championship in 1880, before winning the inaugural tournament played in 1881 at the Toronto Lawn Tennis Club, by defeating W.H. Young, also of Canada, 6–2, 6–2. The following year, Hellmuth lost the final to compatriot Harry D. Gamble, 2–6, 3–6, 2–6.

After a two-year hiatus, Hellmuth lost in consecutive finals in 1885 and 1886, the first to American J.S. Clark 3–6, 6–3, 1–6, 2–6 and the second to his compatriot and childhood friend, C.S. Hyman, in the first of his four consecutive championships, 4–6, 4–6, 6–1, 6–4, 4–6. That year Hellmuth and Hyman also teamed to capture the doubles title.

Hellmuth also founded the London Lawn Tennis Club in 1881. He was an inaugural inductee into the Tennis Canada Hall of Fame, in 1991. He died in 1944, at his home, Allandale House, Toronto.

== Sources ==
- Tennis Canada Hall of Fame inductee profile
- Media Guide Montreal 2009 page 52
