= Canadian Open (tennis) =

Tennis tournament held in Canada

Canadian Open National Bank Open

Tournament information
- Founded: 1881; 145 years ago
- Editions: 136 (2026)
- Location: Montreal, Quebec & Toronto, Ontario; Canada
- Venue: IGA Stadium & Sobeys Stadium
- Surface: Clay (1881–1978); Hard / outdoor (since 1979)
- Website: nationalbankopen.com, omniumbanquenationale.com

Current champions (2026)
- Men's singles: (United States) Ben Shelton
- Women's singles: (Poland) Iga Świątek
- Men's doubles: (Brazil) Orlando Luz (Brazil) Rafael Matos
- Women's doubles: (Czech Republic) Kateřina Siniaková (China) Zhang Shuai
ATP Tour
- Category: ATP 1000
- Draw: 96S / 32Q / 32D
- Prize money: US$9,415,724 (2026)
WTA Tour
- Category: WTA 1000
- Draw: 96S / 32Q / 32D
- Prize money: US$7,433,076 (2026)

The Canadian Open (French: Tournoi de tennis du Canada, currently branded in English as the National Bank Open presented by Rogers for sponsorship reasons and in French as the Omnium Banque Nationale présenté par Rogers) is an annual professional tennis tournament held in Montréal and Toronto, Canada. It is played on outdoor hardcourts. The men's competition is an ATP 1000 event on the ATP Tour, and the women's competition is a WTA 1000 event on the WTA Tour. It is the second-oldest active tennis tournament in the world, after Wimbledon.

Prior to 2011, the two competitions were held during separate weeks in the July–August period; now the two competitions are held during the same week in August. The men's and women's tournaments alternate host cities on an annual basis; since 2021, Sobeys Stadium in Toronto and IGA Stadium have hosted the men's tournament in odd- and even-numbered years respectively, with the other city hosting the women's tournament.

The most recent Canadian men's player to win the singles title was Robert Bédard who won the last of his three Canadian Open singles championships in 1958. The most recent Canadian women's player to win the singles title was Victoria Mboko in 2025.

== History ==
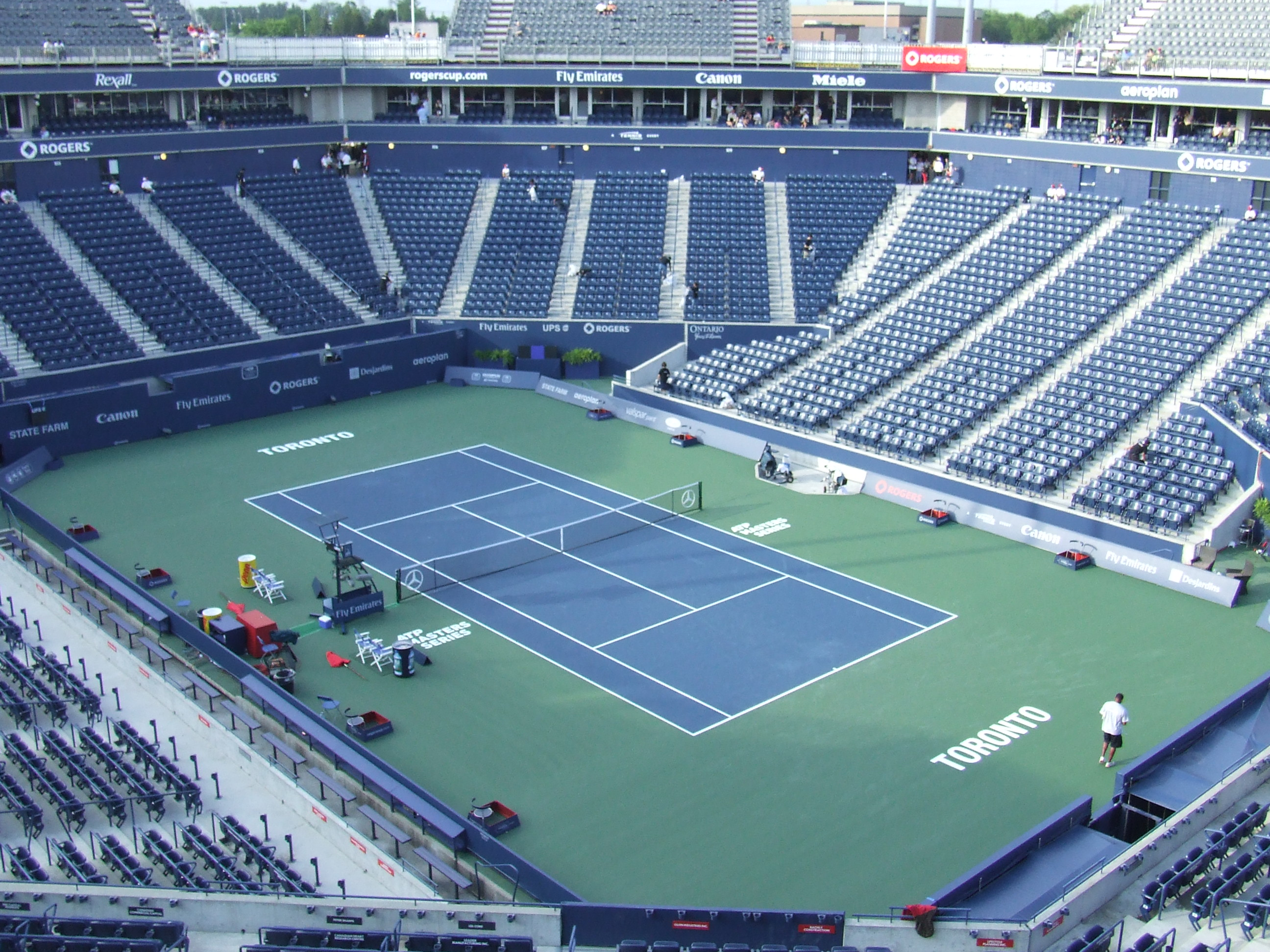
Sobeys Stadium, the current venue for the events held in Toronto.

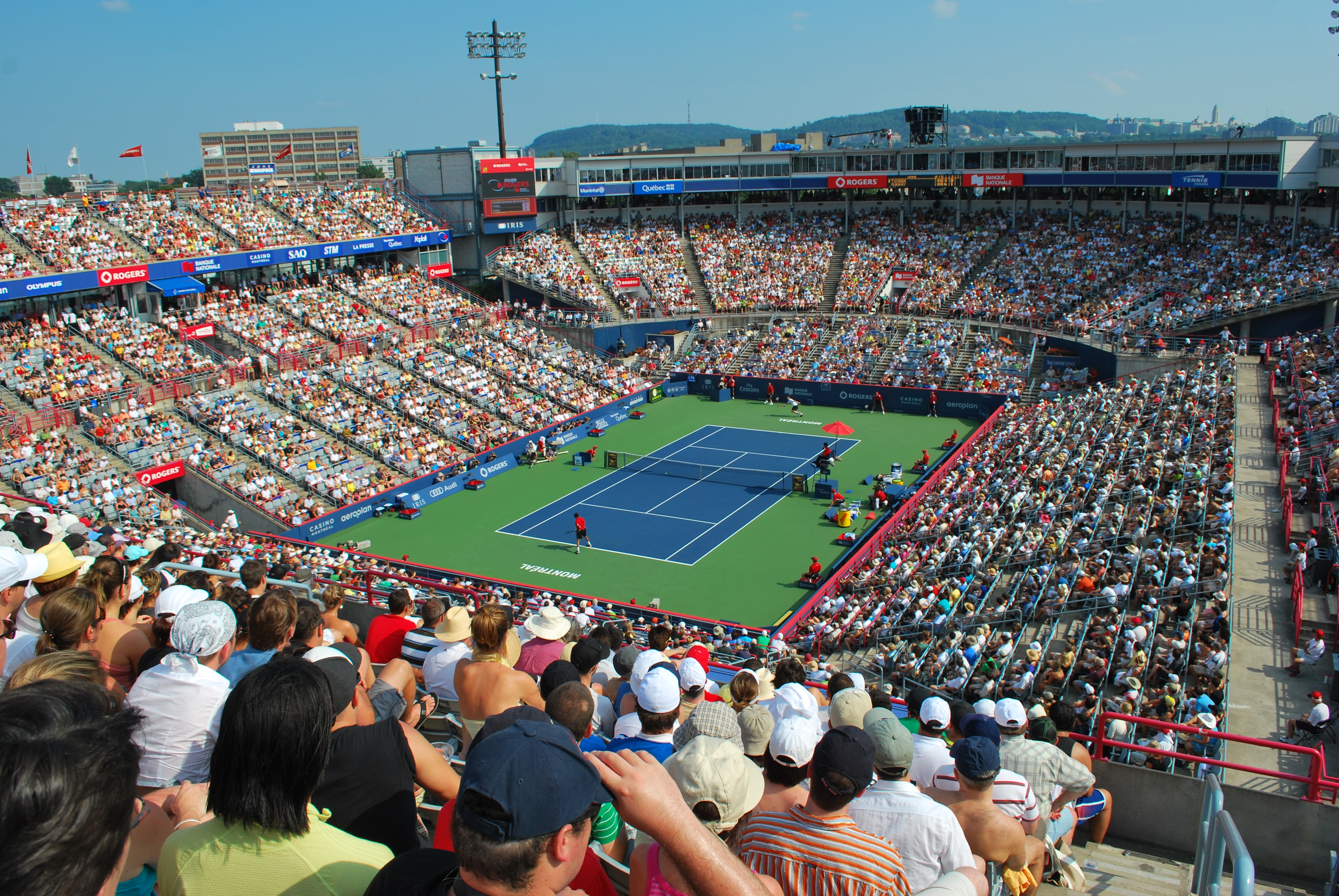
IGA Stadium, the current venue for the events held in Montreal.

Tennis tournaments in Canada began in the summer of 1881. The first men's lawn tennis tournament in Canada was held July to August 1881, and was held at the Toronto Lawn Tennis Club, with men competing. September the same year, the Montreal Tennis club held a similar competition, open to male and female players. By 1887, the Toronto event was being advertised as the Canadian championship. The Canadian Lawn Tennis Association was founded in 1890 and took over the administration of the Toronto event, running its first championship tournament August that year at the Toronto club. Although women played in competitive and exhibition games at events across Canada throughout the 1880s, they first participated in the Lawn Tennis Association's event in 1892. It is the second oldest active tournament after Wimbledon.

Prior to 1968 the tournament was known as the Canadian National Championships. The tournament was part of the WCT circuit briefly in 1971 before joining the Grand Prix circuit from 1972 till 1989. The tournament was sponsored for a number of years by tobacco brands. In the 1970s, Rothmans International was the chief sponsor, followed by Player's Limited in the 1980s, and then Du Maurier from 1995 to 2000. From 1988 onward, these sponsorships relied on a loophole in Canadian tobacco marketing law; while cigarettes couldn't be advertised directly, the tobacco companies could provide corporate sponsorship, and as a result they formed subsidiaries named after the brands as surrogates. However, the federal government announced in 1998 that the loophole would be closed in late 2003. Rogers Communications, a Canadian communications and media company, then took over as the new presenting sponsor in 2000.

The event was played on clay until it was switched permanently to hard courts in 1979. Up to the end of the 1980 Canadian Open, both the men's and women's tournaments were played as a single combined tournament at the National Tennis Centre in Toronto. In 1981, the men's tournament was played at the Jarry Park Stadium in Montreal for the first time. Similarly, 1982 was the first year in which the women's tournament was played in Montreal. From 1981 to 2019, the men's event was played in Toronto in even-numbered years and in Montreal in odd-numbered years, while the women's event was played in Montreal in even numbered years and in Toronto in odd numbered years. As Tennis Canada officially regards the 2020 tournament as being postponed to 2021 due to the COVID-19 pandemic, the same host cities were maintained. Therefore since then, Toronto now hosts the men's tournament in odd-numbered years and women's in even-numbered years, and vice-versa.

The most recent Canadian men's player to win the Canadian Open was Robert Bédard, who won the championship in 1955 over compatriot Henri Rochon in the final, again in 1957 over Ramanathan Krishnan in the final, and finally in 1958 over Whitney Reed in the final. The most recent Canadian women's player to win the singles title was Victoria Mboko, who won the women's singles championships over Naomi Osaka in 2025.

In 1989, two Canadian male tennis players, Grant Connell and Andrew Sznajder, reached the quarterfinals of the event. They were eliminated by Ivan Lendl and Andre Agassi respectively. Lendl has been the tournament's most successful singles player, reaching the final nine times and winning the title in 1980, 1981, 1983, 1987, 1988, and 1989.

In 1995, Andre Agassi and Pete Sampras met in the final, the third of the four times that the two top-ranked men's players would meet that year, after the Australian Open and Indian Wells Open. Agassi's tournament win helped him regain the number-one ranking, which he lost to Sampras after they played each other again at the US Open.

=== Du Maurier Open ===
In 1997, the Canadian federal government introduced legislation restricting the ability of tobacco companies from sponsoring sporting events. The tournament was faced with losing its title sponsor, and eventually du Maurier was replaced.

=== Canada Masters ===
In 2000, International Sport and Leisure signed a 10-year agreement with the ATP Tour for all Masters series events, including the men's tournament. Rogers and AT&T Canada became the title sponsors for the women's event in 2001. ISL went bankrupt, leaving the men's tournament without a sponsor. Serena Williams won the women's tournament for the first time, defeating top-seeded and previous winner Jennifer Capriati. In 2004, the tournament became part of the US Open Series, in the build-up to the US Open Grand Slam tournament. The women's tournament was moved to just before the US Open. Consequently, top players sometimes withdrew from the tournament at the last minute to rest for the upcoming US Open.

=== Rogers Cup ===
In 2005, Rogers Communications became the title sponsor for the men's tournament. It was already the sponsor for the women's event, and both events became known as the Rogers Cup. Rafael Nadal won the men's tournament for his first time, defeating three-time champion Andre Agassi. In 2007, Novak Djokovic won the men's tournament for the first time, becoming the first man to defeat both Nadal and Roger Federer in the same event.

In 2009, WTA CEO Stacey Allaster implemented rules reclassifying the women's event as a Premier 5 event, which guaranteed at least seven of the top ten players. The WTA's rules required each year-end top-10 player from 2008 to participate in at least four Premier 5 tournaments in the 2009 season, or face the threat of fines or docked ranking points. Consequently, 19 of the top 20 female players took part in the 2009 Rogers Cup draw. The ATP mandated participation for the men's tournament as a "1000-level" series event.

Beginning in 2011, the men's and women's tournaments were held during the same week, with each event alternating between Montreal and Toronto.

Bianca Andreescu won the women's tournament in 2019, becoming the first Canadian to win the tournament since Faye Urban in 1969.

In 2020, the men's and women's tournaments were postponed to 2021 due to the COVID-19 pandemic.

=== National Bank Open ===
On February 2, 2021, Tennis Canada announced that National Bank would become the title sponsor of the tournament under a 10-year agreement, with Rogers remaining as presenting sponsor, renaming it the National Bank Open presented by Rogers.

On March 22, 2024, the ATP Tour announced that the tournament would be expanding to a 12-day format for men, with the draws expanding from 56 to 96 players.

== Event titles ==
Years	Men's event title	Women's event title
1881–1967	Canadian Championships	
1970–1978	Rothmans Canadian Open	Canadian Open
1979–1989	Player's International	Canadian Open
1990–1993	Canadian Open	
1994	Canadian Open	Matinée Ltd Canadian Open
1995–2000	du Maurier Open	
2001–2004	Canada Masters	Rogers AT&T Cup
2005–2019	Rogers Cup	
2021–present	National Bank Open presented by Rogers	

== Past finals ==
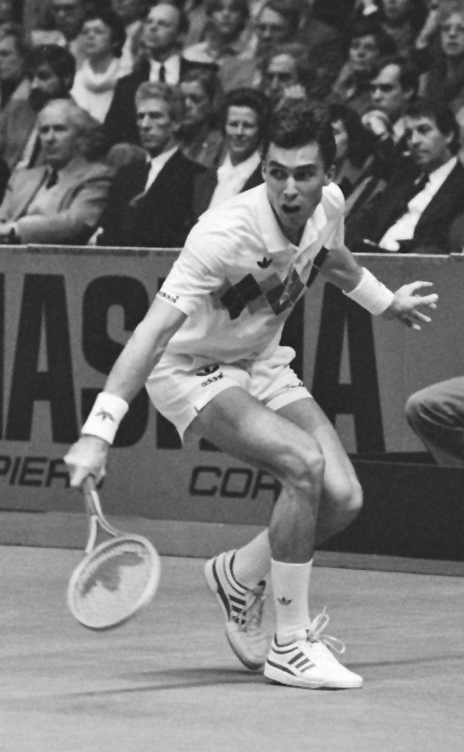
Ivan Lendl has won six men's singles titles, more than any other.

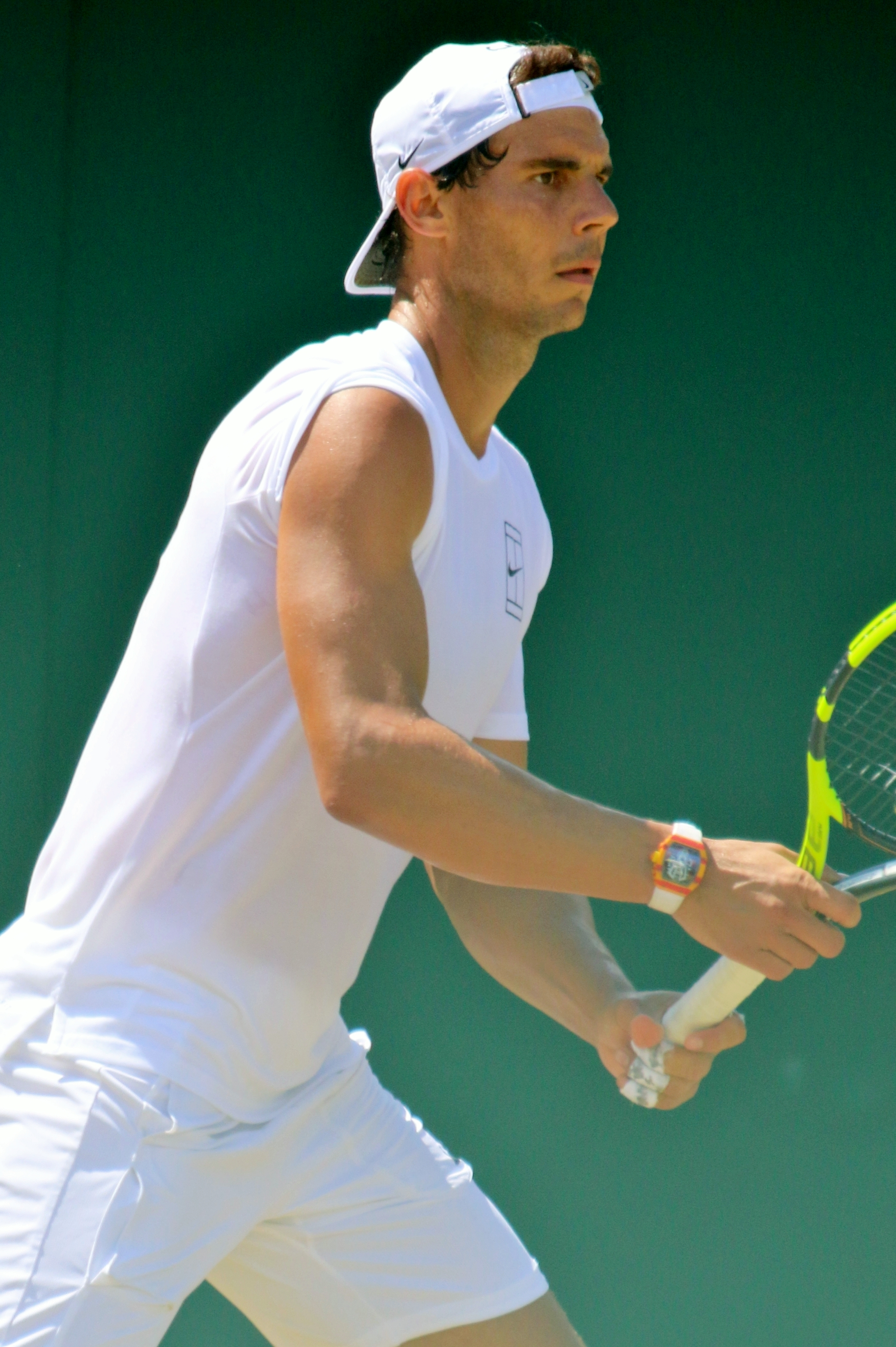
Rafael Nadal won his fifth Canadian Open title in 2019.

=== Men's singles ===
Year	Champions	Runners-up	Score
1881	(Canada) Isidore F. Hellmuth (1/1)	(Canada) W.H. Young	6–2, 6–2
1882	(Canada) Harry D. Gamble (1/1)	(Canada) Isidore F. Hellmuth	6–2, 6–3, 6–2
1883	(United States) Charles H. Farnum (1/1)	(Canada) Charles Smith Hyman	6–3, 6–3, 0–6, 6–0
1884	(Canada) Charles Smith Hyman (1/5)	(Canada) Alexander C. Galt	8–6, 6–8, 4–6, 6–4, 6–2
1885	(United States) Joseph S. Clark (1/1)	(Canada) Isidore F. Hellmuth	6–3, 3–6, 6–1, 6–2
1886	(Canada) Charles Smith Hyman (2/5)	(Canada) Isidore F. Hellmuth	6–4, 6–4, 1–6, 4–6, 6–4
1887	(Canada) Charles Smith Hyman (3/5)	(Canada) Lawrence H. Baldwin	6–0, 6–3, 6–3
1888	(Canada) Charles Smith Hyman (4/5)	(Canada) R.O.S. Wood	7–5, 8–6, 6–4
1889	(Canada) Charles Smith Hyman (5/5)	(Canada) Andrew E. Plummer	6–4, 7–5, 6–4
1890	(United States) Edward E. Tanner (1/1)	(Canada) Oliver R. Macklem	6–4, 6–3, 6–2
1891	(United States) Fred S. Mansfield (1/1)	(United States) Edward E. Tanner	6–1, 6–1, 6–1
1892	(United States) Fred Hovey (1/1)	(United States) Fred S. Mansfield	walkover
1893	(United States) Harry E. Avery (1/1)	(Canada) Henry Gordon Mackenzie	4–6, 4–6, 6–3, 6–1, 6–3
1894	(Canada) Robert W. Pardo Matthews (1/1)	(United States) Harry E. Avery	3–6, 6–0, 2–6, 6–4, 6–2
1895	(United States) William Larned (1/2)	(United States) Arthur E. Foote	6–1, 6–4, 6–2
1896	(United States) Robert Wrenn (1/1)	(United States) Edwin P. Fischer	6–1, 6–3, 7–5
1897	(United States) Leo Ware (1/2)	(United States) Edwin P. Fischer	8–6, 6–1, 6–3
1898	(United States) Leo Ware (2/2)	(United States) Malcolm Whitman	6–8, 6–2, 6–4, 6–2
1899	(United States) Malcolm Whitman (1/2)	(United States) Leo Ware	6–2, 6–3, 6–4
1900	(United States) Malcolm Whitman (2/2)	(United States) William Larned	7–5, 3–6, 6–3, 1–6, 7–5
1901	(United States) William Larned (2/2)	(United States) Beals Wright	6–4, 6–4, 6–2
1902	(United States) Beals Wright (1/3)	(United States) Irving Wright	6–3, 6–3, 3–6, 6–1
1903	(United States) Beals Wright (2/3)	(United States) Edgar Leonard	8–6, 6–3, 6–4
1904	(United States) Beals Wright (3/3)	(United States) Louis Harry Waidner	6–1, 6–2, 6–3
1905	Not Held		
1906	(United States) Irving Wright (1/1)	(United States) Edwin P. Fischer	6–1, 6–3, 6–1
1907	(Canada) James F. Foulkes (1/3)	(Canada) Ralph Burns	6–3, 6–8, 6–3, 6–4
1908	(Canada) Thomas Y. Sherwell (1/2)	(Canada) James F. Foulkes	6–4, 6–1, 6–2
1909	(Canada) James F. Foulkes (2/3)		
1910	(Canada) James F. Foulkes (3/3)	(Canada) Robert Patrick Hay Baird	2–6, 6–1, 6–2, 4–6, 6–2
1911	(Canada) Bernie Schwengers (1/2)	(Canada) Robert Patrick Hay Baird	13–11, 6–2, 6–4
1912	(Canada) Bernie Schwengers (2/2)	(United States) Joseph C. Tyler	6–2, 3–6, 6–3, 7–5
1913	(Canada) Robert Patrick Hay Baird (1/1)	(Canada) Ralph Burns	6–2, 6–0, 4–6, 6–1
1914	(Canada) Thomas Y. Sherwell (2/2)	(Canada) Robert Patrick Hay Baird	4–6, 6–2, 6–3, 6–3
1915	No competition (due to World War I)		
1916	No competition (due to World War I)		
1917	No competition (due to World War I)		
1918	No competition (due to World War I)		
1919	(Empire of Japan) Seiichiro Kashio (1/1)	(United States) Walter K. Wesbrook	3–6, 6–3, 6–1, 11–9
1920	(Canada) Paul D. Bennett (1/1)	(Canada) William Leroy Rennie	6–3, 7–5, 6–4
1921	(United States) Wallace J. Bates (1/1)	(United States) Edmund Levy	4–6, 6–4, 6–2, 6–3
1922	(United States) Frank Anderson (1/1)	(Canada) Robert Patrick Hay Baird	6–3, 6–4, 6–3
1923	(Canada) William Leroy Rennie (1/1)	(United States) W.H. Richards	6–2, 6–3, 6–3
1924	(United States) George Lott (1/1)	(Canada) Cyril Andrewes	6–3, 7–5, 6–1
1925	(Canada) Willard F. Crocker (1/1)	(United States) Wallace Scott	4–6, 7–5, 18–16, 6–2
1926	(United States) Leon De Turenne (1/1)	(United States) Wallace Scott	6–4, 6–3, 6–0
1927	(Canada) Jack A. Wright (1/3)	(United States) Leon De Turenne	7–5, 8–6, 6–3
1928	(United States) Wilmer Allison (1/1)	(United States) John Van Ryn	6–2, 6–4, 6–3
1929	(Canada) Jack A. Wright (2/3)	(United States) Frank Shields	6–4, 6–4, 1–6, 7–5
1930	(Republic of Ireland) George Lyttleton-Rogers (1/1)	(Canada) Gilbert Nunns	6–4, 8–6, 6–8, 9–7
1931	(Canada) Jack A. Wright (3/3)	(Canada) Gilbert Nunns	6–3, 6–4, 6–2
1932	(United States) Frank Parker (1/2)	(United States) George Lott	2–6, 6–1, 7–5, 6–2
1933	(United States) John Murio (1/1)	(Canada) Walter Martin	6–3, 4–6, 4–6, 6–2, 6–2
1934	(Canada) Marcel Rainville (1/1)	(United States) Hal Surface	6–4, 7–5, 6–0
1935	(United States) Eugene Smith (1/1)	(United States) Richard Bennett	8–6, 6–2, 7–5
1936	(United States) Jack Tidball (1/1)	(United States) John Murio	8–6, 6–2, 6–2
1937	(United States) Walter Senior (1/1)	(Canada) Robert Murray	2–6, 6–2, 6–3, 3–6, 6–2
1938	(United States) Frank Parker (2/2)	(United States) Wilmer Allison	6–2, 6–2, 9–7
1939	(United States) Pride Morey Lewis (1/2)	(United States) Robert Madden	6–2, 6–2, 6–3
1940	(Canada) Donald McDiarmid (1/1)	(Canada) Lewis Duff	6–1, 7–5, 6–2
1941	No competition (due to World War II)		
1942	No competition (due to World War II)		
1943	No competition (due to World War II)		
1944	No competition (due to World War II)		
1945	No competition (due to World War II)		
1946	(United States) Pride Morey Lewis (2/2)	(Canada) Donald McDiarmid	2–6, 8–6, 6–4, 6–4
1947	(United States) James Evert (1/1)	(United States) Emery Neale	2–6, 6–3, 5–7, 6–1, 6–2
1948	(United States) Bill Tully (1/1)	(Canada) Henri Rochon	6–4, 7–5, 6–0
1949	(Canada) Henri Rochon (1/1)	(Canada) Lorne Main	6–3, 6–4, 4–6, 6–2
1950	(Canada) Brendan Macken (1/1)	(Canada) Henri Rochon	6–0, 6–0, 6–3
1951	(United States) Tony Vincent (1/1)	(United States) Seymour Greenberg	7–9, 7–5, 7–5, 6–2
1952	(United States) Dick Savitt (1/1)	(Denmark) Kurt Nielsen	6–1, 6–0, 6–1
1953	(Australia) Mervyn Rose (1/1)	(Australia) Rex Hartwig	6–3, 6–4, 6–2
1954	(United States) Bernard Bartzen (1/1)	(Japan) Kosei Kamo	6–4, 6–0, 6–3
1955	(Canada) Robert Bédard (1/3)	(Canada) Henri Rochon	8–6, 6–2, 6–1
1956	(United States) Noel Brown (1/1)	(Canada) Donald Fontana	6–0, 2–6, 6–3, 6–3
1957	(Canada) Robert Bédard (2/3)	(India) Ramanathan Krishnan	6–1, 1–6, 6–2, 6–4
1958	(Canada) Robert Bédard (3/3)	(United States) Whitney Reed	6–0, 6–3, 6–3
1959	(Cuba) Reynaldo Garrido (1/1)	(Cuba) Orlando Garrido	6–4, 1–6, 6–4, 6–1
1960	(Austria) Ladislav Legenstein (1/1)	(Australia) Warren Woodcock	6–2, 6–2, 7–5
1961	(United States) Whitney Reed (1/2)	(United Kingdom) Mike Sangster	3–6, 6–0, 6–4, 6–2
1962	(Spain) Juan Manuel Couder (1/1)	(United States) Sean Frost	6–3, 6–4, 6–3
1963	(United States) Whitney Reed (2/2)	(Australia) Kyle Carpenter	6–2, 6–4, 6–4
1964	(Australia) Roy Emerson (1/1)	(Australia) Fred Stolle	2–6, 4–6, 6–4, 6–3, 6–4
1965	(United States) Ronald Holmberg (1/1)	(United States) Lester Sack	4–6, 4–6, 6–4, 6–2, 6–2
1966	(United States) Allen Fox (1/1)	(Australia) Allan Stone	6–4, 6–4, 6–3
1967	(Spain) Manuel Santana (1/1)	(Australia) Roy Emerson	6–1, 10–8, 6–4
↓ Open era ↓
1968	(India) Ramanathan Krishnan (1/1)	(Denmark) Torben Ulrich	6–3, 6–0, 7–5
1969	(United States) Cliff Richey (1/1)	(United States) Butch Buchholz	6–4, 5–7, 6–4, 6–0
1970	(Australia) Rod Laver (1/1)	(United Kingdom) Roger Taylor	6–0, 4–6, 6–3
↓ WCT circuit ↓
1971	(Australia) John Newcombe (1/1)	(Netherlands) Tom Okker	7–6, 3–6, 6–2, 7–6
↓ Grand Prix circuit ↓
1972	(Romania) Ilie Năstase (1/1)	(Rhodesia) Andrew Pattison	6–4, 6–3
1973	(Netherlands) Tom Okker (1/1)	(Spain) Manuel Orantes	6–3, 6–2, 6–1
1974	(Argentina) Guillermo Vilas (1/2)	(Spain) Manuel Orantes	6–4, 6–2, 6–3
1975	(Spain) Manuel Orantes (1/1)	(Romania) Ilie Năstase	7–6^{(7–4)}, 6–0, 6–1
1976	(Argentina) Guillermo Vilas (2/2)	(Poland) Wojciech Fibak	6–4, 7–6, 6–2
1977	(United States) Jeff Borowiak (1/1)	(Chile) Jaime Fillol	6–0, 6–1
1978	(United States) Eddie Dibbs (1/1)	(Argentina) José Luis Clerc	5–7, 6–4, 6–1
1979	(Sweden) Björn Borg (1/1)	(United States) John McEnroe	6–3, 6–3
1980	(Czechoslovakia) Ivan Lendl (1/6)	(Sweden) Björn Borg	4–6, 5–4 (ret.)
1981	(Czechoslovakia) Ivan Lendl (2/6)	(United States) Eliot Teltscher	6–3, 6–2
1982	(United States) Vitas Gerulaitis (1/1)	(Czechoslovakia) Ivan Lendl	4–6, 6–1, 6–3
1983	(Czechoslovakia) Ivan Lendl (3/6)	(Sweden) Anders Järryd	6–2, 6–2
1984	(United States) John McEnroe (1/2)	(United States) Vitas Gerulaitis	6–0, 6–3
1985	(United States) John McEnroe (2/2)	(Czechoslovakia) Ivan Lendl	7–5, 6–3
1986	(West Germany) Boris Becker (1/1)	(Sweden) Stefan Edberg	6–4, 3–6, 6–3
1987	(Czechoslovakia) Ivan Lendl (4/6)	(Sweden) Stefan Edberg	6–4, 7–6^{(7–2)}
1988	(Czechoslovakia) Ivan Lendl (5/6)	(United States) Kevin Curren	7–6^{(12–10)}, 6–2
1989	(Czechoslovakia) Ivan Lendl (6/6)	(United States) John McEnroe	6–1, 6–3
↓ ATP Masters 1000 (Note: Known as Championship Series, Single Week from 1990 till 1995, Super 9 from 1996 till 1999 and Masters Series from 2000 till 2008.) ↓
1990	(United States) Michael Chang (1/1)	(United States) Jay Berger	4–6, 6–3, 7–6^{(7–2)}
1991	(Soviet Union) Andrei Chesnokov (1/1)	(Czechoslovakia) Petr Korda	3–6, 6–4, 6–3
1992	(United States) Andre Agassi (1/3)	(United States) Ivan Lendl	3–6, 6–2, 6–0
1993	(Sweden) Mikael Pernfors (1/1)	(United States) Todd Martin	2–6, 6–2, 7–5
1994	(United States) Andre Agassi (2/3)	(Australia) Jason Stoltenberg	6–4, 6–4
1995	(United States) Andre Agassi (3/3)	(United States) Pete Sampras	3–6, 6–2, 6–3
1996	(South Africa) Wayne Ferreira (1/1)	(Australia) Todd Woodbridge	6–2, 6–4
1997	(United States) Chris Woodruff (1/1)	(Brazil) Gustavo Kuerten	7–5, 4–6, 6–3
1998	(Australia) Patrick Rafter (1/1)	(Netherlands) Richard Krajicek	7–6^{(7–3)}, 6–4
1999	(Sweden) Thomas Johansson (1/1)	(Russia) Yevgeny Kafelnikov	1–6, 6–3, 6–3
2000	(Russia) Marat Safin (1/1)	(Israel) Harel Levy	6–2, 6–3
2001	(Romania) Andrei Pavel (1/1)	(Australia) Patrick Rafter	7–6^{(7–3)}, 2–6, 6–3
2002	(Argentina) Guillermo Cañas (1/1)	(United States) Andy Roddick	6–4, 7–5
2003	(United States) Andy Roddick (1/1)	(Argentina) David Nalbandian	6–1, 6–3
2004	(Switzerland) Roger Federer (1/2)	(United States) Andy Roddick	7–5, 6–3
2005	(Spain) Rafael Nadal (1/5)	(United States) Andre Agassi	6–3, 4–6, 6–2
2006	(Switzerland) Roger Federer (2/2)	(France) Richard Gasquet	2–6, 6–3, 6–2
2007	(Serbia) Novak Djokovic (1/4)	(Switzerland) Roger Federer	7–6^{(7–2)}, 2–6, 7–6^{(7–2)}
2008	(Spain) Rafael Nadal (2/5)	(Germany) Nicolas Kiefer	6–3, 6–2
2009	(United Kingdom) Andy Murray (1/3)	(Argentina) Juan Martín del Potro	6–7^{(4–7)}, 7–6^{(7–3)}, 6–1
2010	(United Kingdom) Andy Murray (2/3)	(Switzerland) Roger Federer	7–5, 7–5
2011	(Serbia) Novak Djokovic (2/4)	(United States) Mardy Fish	6–2, 3–6, 6–4
2012	(Serbia) Novak Djokovic (3/4)	(France) Richard Gasquet	6–3, 6–2
2013	(Spain) Rafael Nadal (3/5)	(Canada) Milos Raonic	6–2, 6–2
2014	(France) Jo-Wilfried Tsonga (1/1)	(Switzerland) Roger Federer	7–5, 7–6^{(7–3)}
2015	(United Kingdom) Andy Murray (3/3)	(Serbia) Novak Djokovic	6–4, 4–6, 6–3
2016	(Serbia) Novak Djokovic (4/4)	(Japan) Kei Nishikori	6–3, 7–5
2017	(Germany) Alexander Zverev (1/1)	(Switzerland) Roger Federer	6–3, 6–4
2018	(Spain) Rafael Nadal (4/5)	(Greece) Stefanos Tsitsipas	6–2, 7–6^{(7–4)}
2019	(Spain) Rafael Nadal (5/5)	(Russia) Daniil Medvedev	6–3, 6–0
2020	No competition (due to COVID-19 pandemic)		
2021	(Russia) Daniil Medvedev (1/1)	(United States) Reilly Opelka	6–4, 6–3
2022	(Spain) Pablo Carreño Busta (1/1)	(Poland) Hubert Hurkacz	3–6, 6–3, 6–3
2023	(Italy) Jannik Sinner (1/1)	(Australia) Alex de Minaur	6–4, 6–1
2024	(Australia) Alexei Popyrin (1/1)	(Note: Competed under no flag due to the Russian invasion of Ukraine.) Andrey Rublev	6–2, 6–4
2025	(United States) Ben Shelton (1/2)	Karen Khachanov	6–7^{(5–7)}, 6–4, 7–6^{(7–3)}
2026	(United States) Ben Shelton (2/2)	(United States) Brandon Nakashima	6–3, 7–6^{(7–4)}

=== Women's singles ===
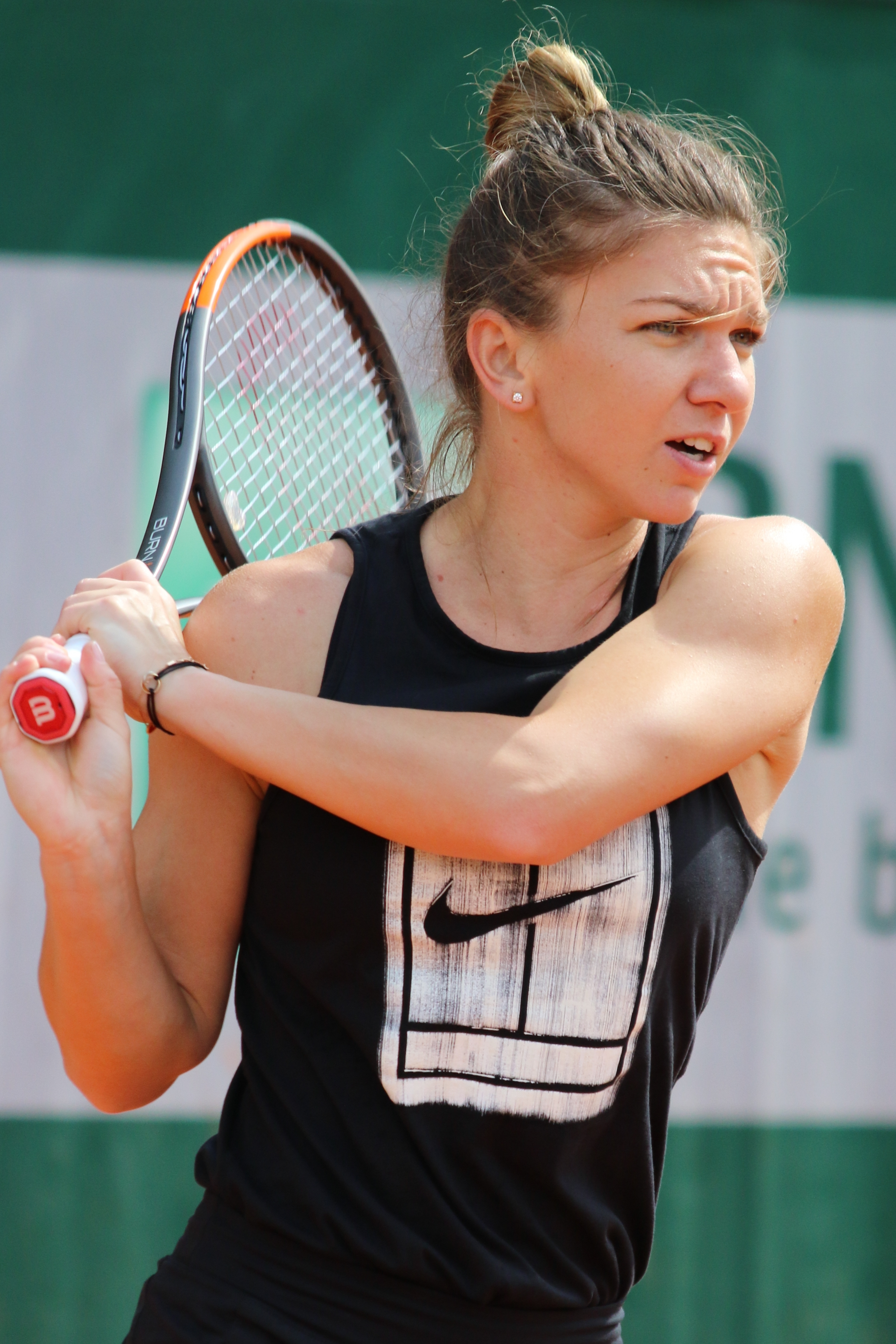
Simona Halep won the tournament three times, the last being in 2022.

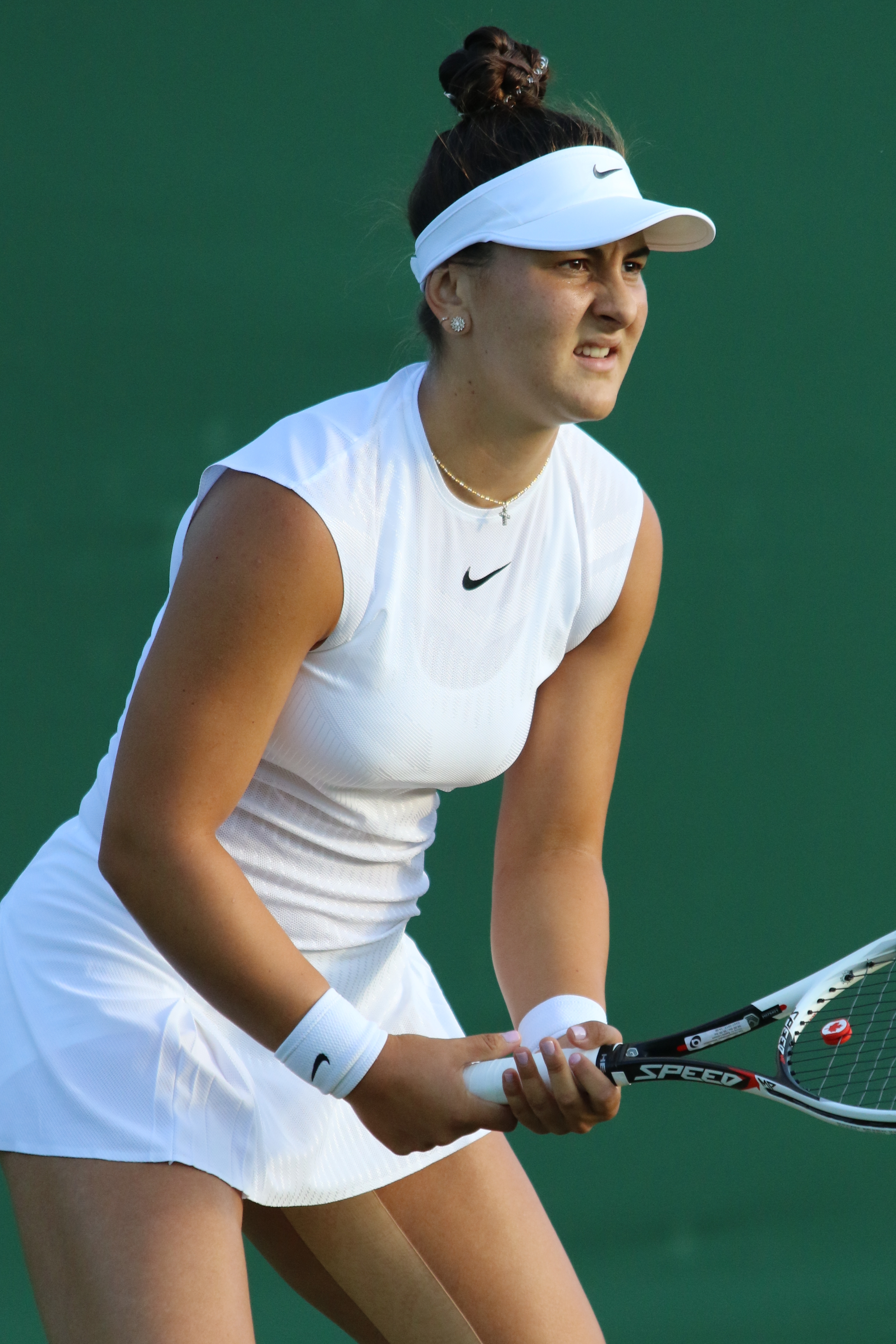
In 2019, Bianca Andreescu became the second local player from the Open era to win the tournament after 50 years.

Year	Champions	Runners-up	Score
1892	(Canada) Maude Delano-Osborne (1/3)	(Canada) Florence Smith	9–7, 7–9, 6–2, 8–6
1893	(Canada) Maude Delano-Osborne (2/3)	(Canada) Florence Smith	6–8, 6–2, 6–2
1894	(Canada) Maude Delano-Osborne (3/3)	(Canada) Mrs Whitehead	3–6, 6–2, 6–1
1895	(Canada) Florence Smith (1/1)	(Canada) Maude Delano-Osborne	3–6, 6–1, 6–3
1896	(United States) Juliette Atkinson (1/3)	(Canada) Florence Smith	6–1, 6–2
1897	(United States) Juliette Atkinson (2/3)	(Canada) Jane Davis	6–3, 6–1
1898	(United States) Juliette Atkinson (3/3)	(Canada) Eustace Smith	6–4, 6–1
1899	(Canada) Violet Summerhayes (1/5)		6–2, 9–11, 6–3
1900	(Canada) Violet Summerhayes (2/5)	(Canada) Mrs Burgess	6–8, 6–4, 6–0, 6–4
1901	(Canada) Violet Summerhayes (3/5)	(Canada) Mrs Burgess	6–3, 2–6, 6–0, 0–6, 9–7
1902	(Canada) Miss Hague (1/1)	(Canada) Violet Summerhayes	6–0, 6–1
1903	(Canada) Violet Summerhayes (4/5)	(Canada) Mrs Burgess	1–6, 6–4, 6–2
1904	(Canada) Violet Summerhayes (5/5)		
1905	Not Held		
1906	(Canada) Lois Moyes Bickle (1/10)	(Canada) Violet Summerhayes	6–3, 6–3
1907	(Canada) Lois Moyes Bickle (2/10)	(Canada) Miss Hague	3–6, 6–4, 6–3
1908	(Canada) Lois Moyes Bickle (3/10)	(Canada) Evelyn Clay	6–2, 6–1
1909	(United States) May Sutton (1/1)	(United Kingdom) Edith Boucher Hannam	6–3, 6–3
1910	(Canada) Lois Moyes Bickle (4/10)	(Canada) Rhea Fairbairn	6–4, 6–0
1911	(United States) Florence Sutton (1/1)		
1912	(Canada) Miss Birch (1/1)	(Canada) Miss Beckett	3–6, 6–3, 7–5
1913	(Canada) Lois Moyes Bickle (5/10)	(Canada) Florence Best	6–4, 6–4
1914	(Canada) Lois Moyes Bickle (6/10)	(Canada) Florence Best	6–4, 6–1
1915	no competition (due to World War I)		
1916	no competition (due to World War I)		
1917	no competition (due to World War I)		
1918	no competition (due to World War I)		
1919	(United States) Marion Zinderstein (1/1)	(Canada) Lois Moyes Bickle	8–6, 6–4
1920	(Canada) Lois Moyes Bickle (7/10)	(Canada) Florence Best	
1921	(Canada) Lois Moyes Bickle (8/10)	(United States) Margaret Grove	6–3, 6–3
1922	(Canada) Lois Moyes Bickle (9/10)	(Bermuda) Gladys Hutchings	6–4, 6–1
1923	(Canada) Florence Best (1/1)	(Canada) M. Brooks	6–3, 6–3
1924	(Canada) Lois Moyes Bickle (10/10)	(Canada) Marjorie Leeming	4–6, 6–3, 6–4
1925	(Canada) Marjorie Leeming (1/2)	(Canada) Mrs H. F. Wright	7–5, 6–4
1926	(Canada) Marjorie Leeming (2/2)	(United States) Marjorie Gladman	6–2, 6–0
1927	(United States) Caroline Swartz (1/1)	(United States) Edith Cross	6–3, 4–6, 7–5
1928	(United States) Marjorie Gladman (1/1)	(United States) Mary Greef	5–7, 6–1, 6–1
1929	(Canada) Olive Wade (1/3)	(United States) Ruth Riese	6–0, 1–6, 6–1
1930	(Canada) Olive Wade (2/3)	(Canada) Marjorie Leeming	6–4, 2–6, 6–4
1931	(United States) Edith Cross (1/1)	(Canada) Marjorie Leeming	6–2, 6–2
1932	(Canada) Olive Wade (3/3)	(Canada) Marjorie Leeming	4–6, 6–4, 6–1
1933	(United States) Gracyn Wheeler (1/2)	(Canada) Mary Campbell	4–6, 6–1, 6–3
1934	(Canada) Caroline Deacon (1/1)	(Canada) Eleanor Young	7–5, 6–3
1935	(United States) Margaret Osborne duPont (1/1)	(United States) Gussie Raegener	6–4, 6–2
1936	(United States) Esther Bartosh (1/1)	(Canada) Jean Milne	6–1, 3–6, 6–1
1937	(United Kingdom) Evelyn Dearman (1/1)	(United Kingdom) Mary Hardwick	(walkover)
1938	(Canada) Rene Bolte (1/1)	(United States) Ruth Porter	6–4, 6–4
1939	(United States) Elizabeth Blackman (1/1)	(Canada) Rene Bolte	7–5, 7–5
1940	(Canada) Eleanor Young (1/1)	(Canada) Jean Milne	7–5, 7–5
1941	No competition (due to World War II)		
1942	No competition (due to World War II)		
1943	No competition (due to World War II)		
1944	No competition (due to World War II)		
1945	No competition (due to World War II)		
1946	(United States) Baba Lewis (1/2)	(United States) Noreen Haney	6–1, 6–3
1947	(United States) Gracyn Wheeler Kelleher (2/2)	(Canada) Eleanor Young	6–0, 3–6, 6–0
1948	(Canada) Patricia Macken (1/1)	(Canada) Elaine Fildes	2–6, 8–6, 6–2
1949	(United States) Baba Lewis (2/2)	(Canada) Patricia Macken	6–0, 6–1
1950	(United States) Doris Popple (1/1)	(United Kingdom) Barbara Knapp	8–6, 6–8, 7–5
1951	(United States) Lucille Davidson (1/1)	(Canada) Pat Lowe	8–6, 6–1
1952	(Mexico) Melita Ramírez (1/2)	(United States) Lucille Davidson	6–4, 6–3
1953	(Mexico) Melita Ramírez (2/2)	(Australia) Thelma Coyne Long	6–1, 6–3
1954	(United States) Karol Fageros (1/1)	(United States) Ethel Norton	3–6, 7–5, 6–4
1955	(Canada) Hanna Sladek (1/1)	(United States) Connie Bowan	8–6, 6–0
1956	(Canada) Jean Laird (1/1)	(United States) Linda Vail	4–6, 7–5, 8–6
1957	(Canada) Louise Brown (1/1)	(Canada) Singeline Boeck	6–4, 6–3
1958	(Canada) Eleanor Dodge (1/1)	(United States) Barbara Browning	6–3, 6–4
1959	(Australia) Marie Martin (1/1)	(Mexico) Martha Hernández	6–1, 6–2
1960	(United States) Donna Floyd (1/1)	(Canada) Ann Barclay	7–5, 6–2
1961	(United Kingdom) Ann Haydon-Jones (1/1)	(Canada) Ann Barclay	6–4, 6–0
1962	(Canada) Ann Barclay (1/2)	(Canada) Louise Brown	6–3, 6–4
1963	(Canada) Ann Barclay (2/2)	(Canada) Louise Brown	6–0, 6–1
1964	(Canada) Benita Senn (1/1)	(Canada) Louise Brown	6–4, 6–4
1965	(United States) Julie Heldman (1/1)	(Canada) Faye Urban	6–3, 8–6
1966	(United Kingdom) Rita Bentley (1/1)	(Canada) Susan Butt	6–3, 6–3
1967	(United States) Kathleen Harter (1/1)	(United Kingdom) Rita Bentley	6–1, 5–7, 7–5
↓ Open era ↓
1968	(United States) Jane Bartkowicz (1/1)	(Canada) Faye Urban	6–3, 6–3
1969	(Canada) Faye Urban (1/1)	(Canada) Vicki Berner	6–2, 6–0
1970	(Australia) Margaret Smith Court (1/1)	(United States) Rosemary Casals	6–8, 6–4, 6–4
1971	(France) Françoise Dürr (1/1)	(Australia) Evonne Goolagong Cawley	6–4, 6–2
1972	(Australia) Evonne Goolagong Cawley (1/2)	(United Kingdom) Virginia Wade	6–3, 6–1
1973	(Australia) Evonne Goolagong Cawley (2/2)	(West Germany) Helga Niessen Masthoff	7–6, 6–4
1974	(United States) Chris Evert (1/4)	(United States) Julie Heldman	6–0, 6–3
1975	(United States) Marcie Louie (1/1)	(United States) Laura duPont	6–1, 4–6, 6–4
1976	(Socialist Federal Republic of Yugoslavia) Mima Jaušovec (1/1)	(Australia) Lesley Hunt	6–2, 6–0
1977	(Czechoslovakia) Regina Maršíková (1/2)	(South Africa) Marise Kruger	6–4, 4–6, 6–2
1978	(Czechoslovakia) Regina Maršíková (2/2)	(Romania) Virginia Ruzici	7–5, 6–7^{(9–11)}, 6–2
1979	(United States) Laura duPont (1/1)	(South Africa) Brigitte Cuypers	6–4, 6–7, 6–1
1980	(United States) Chris Evert (2/4)	(Romania) Virginia Ruzici	6–3, 6–1
1981	(United States) Tracy Austin (1/1)	(United States) Chris Evert	6–1, 6–4
1982	(United States) Martina Navratilova (1/3)	(United States) Andrea Jaeger	6–3, 7–5
1983	(United States) Martina Navratilova (2/3)	(United States) Chris Evert	6–4, 4–6, 6–1
1984	(United States) Chris Evert (3/4)	(United States) Alycia Moulton	6–2, 7–6^{(7–3)}
1985	(United States) Chris Evert (4/4)	(West Germany) Claudia Kohde-Kilsch	6–2, 6–4
1986	(Czechoslovakia) Helena Suková (1/1)	(United States) Pam Shriver	6–2, 7–5
1987	(United States) Pam Shriver (1/1)	(United States) Zina Garrison	6–4, 6–1
1988	(Argentina) Gabriela Sabatini (1/1)	(Soviet Union) Natasha Zvereva	6–1, 6–2
1989	(United States) Martina Navratilova (3/3)	(Spain) Arantxa Sánchez Vicario	6–2, 6–2
1990	(West Germany) Steffi Graf (1/2)	(Bulgaria) Katerina Maleeva	6–1, 6–7^{(6–8)}, 6–3
1991	(United States) Jennifer Capriati (1/1)	(Bulgaria) Katerina Maleeva	6–2, 6–3
1992	(Spain) Arantxa Sánchez Vicario (1/2)	(Federal Republic of Yugoslavia) Monica Seles	6–4, 3–6, 6–4
1993	(Germany) Steffi Graf (2/2)	(United States) Jennifer Capriati	6–1, 0–6, 6–3
1994	(Spain) Arantxa Sánchez Vicario (2/2)	(Germany) Steffi Graf	7–5, 1–6, 7–6^{(7–4)}
1995	(United States) Monica Seles (1/4)	(South Africa) Amanda Coetzer	6–0, 6–1
1996	(United States) Monica Seles (2/4)	(Spain) Arantxa Sánchez Vicario	6–1, 7–6^{(7–2)}
1997	(United States) Monica Seles (3/4)	(Germany) Anke Huber	6–2, 6–4
1998	(United States) Monica Seles (4/4)	(Spain) Arantxa Sánchez Vicario	6–3, 6–2
1999	(Switzerland) Martina Hingis (1/2)	(United States) Monica Seles	6–4, 6–4
2000	(Switzerland) Martina Hingis (2/2)	(United States) Serena Williams	0–6, 6–3, 3–0 (ret.)
2001	(United States) Serena Williams (1/3)	(United States) Jennifer Capriati	6–1, 6–7^{(7–9)}, 6–3
2002	(France) Amélie Mauresmo (1/2)	(United States) Jennifer Capriati	6–4, 6–1
2003	(Belgium) Justine Henin (1/2)	(Russia) Lina Krasnoroutskaya	6–1, 6–0
2004	(France) Amélie Mauresmo (2/2)	(Russia) Elena Likhovtseva	6–1, 6–0
2005	(Belgium) Kim Clijsters (1/1)	(Belgium) Justine Henin	7–5, 6–1
2006	(Serbia) Ana Ivanovic (1/1)	(Switzerland) Martina Hingis	6–2, 6–3
2007	(Belgium) Justine Henin (2/2)	(Serbia) Jelena Janković	7–6^{(7–3)}, 7–5
2008	(Russia) Dinara Safina (1/1)	(Slovakia) Dominika Cibulková	6–2, 6–1
2009	(Russia) Elena Dementieva (1/1)	(Russia) Maria Sharapova	6–4, 6–3
2010	(Denmark) Caroline Wozniacki (1/1)	(Russia) Vera Zvonareva	6–3, 6–2
2011	(United States) Serena Williams (2/3)	(Australia) Samantha Stosur	6–4, 6–2
2012	(Czech Republic) Petra Kvitová (1/1)	(China) Li Na	7–5, 2–6, 6–3
2013	(United States) Serena Williams (3/3)	(Romania) Sorana Cîrstea	6–2, 6–0
2014	(Poland) Agnieszka Radwańska (1/1)	(United States) Venus Williams	6–4, 6–2
2015	(Switzerland) Belinda Bencic (1/1)	(Romania) Simona Halep	7–6^{(7–5)}, 6–7^{(4–7)}, 3–0 (ret.)
2016	(Romania) Simona Halep (1/3)	(United States) Madison Keys	7–6^{(7–2)}, 6–3
2017	(Ukraine) Elina Svitolina (1/1)	(Denmark) Caroline Wozniacki	6–4, 6–0
2018	(Romania) Simona Halep (2/3)	(United States) Sloane Stephens	7–6^{(8–6)}, 3–6, 6–4
2019	(Canada) Bianca Andreescu (1/1)	(United States) Serena Williams	3–1 (ret.)
2020	no competition (due to COVID-19 pandemic)		
2021	(Italy) Camila Giorgi (1/1)	(Czech Republic) Karolína Plíšková	6–3, 7–5
2022	(Romania) Simona Halep (3/3)	(Brazil) Beatriz Haddad Maia	6–3, 2–6, 6–3
2023	(United States) Jessica Pegula (1/2)	Liudmila Samsonova	6–1, 6–0
2024	(United States) Jessica Pegula (2/2)	(United States) Amanda Anisimova	6–3, 2–6, 6–1
2025	(Canada) Victoria Mboko (1/1)	(Japan) Naomi Osaka	2–6, 6–4, 6–1
2026	(Poland) Iga Świątek (1/1)	(Kazakhstan) Elena Rybakina	6–2, 6–3

=== Men's doubles ===
Year	Champions	Runners-up	Score
1924	(United States) Samuel Hardy (United States) George Lott	(Canada) Willard Crocker (Canada) David R. Morrice	6–?, 6–2, 6–4
1925	(Canada) Willard Crocker (Canada) Jack Wright	(United States) Wallace Scott (United States) Leon Turenne	6–2, 6–2, 0–6, 6–2
1926	(United States) Leon de Turenne (Canada) John Proctor	(United States) Howard Langlie (United States) Armand Quilman	6–1, 6–3, 6–1
1927	(United States) Bradshaw Harrison (United States) Sherman Lockwood	(United States) Stanley Almquist (United States) John Risso	4–6, 6–1, 6–4, 6–2
1928	(United States) Wilmer Allison (United States) John Van Ryn	(Canada) Willard Crocker (Canada) Marcel Rainville	6–1, 6–3, 6–1
1929	(Canada) Willard Crocker (2) (Canada) Jack Wright (2)	(United States) Frank Shields (United States) Donald Strachan	6–3, 6–4, 6–0
1930	(United States) J. Gilbert Hall (United States) Fritz Mercur	(Canada) Walter Martin (Canada) Gilbert Nunns	11–9, 6–2, 6–4
1931	(Canada) Marcel Rainville (Canada) Jack Wright (3)	(United States) Henry Prusoff (United States) Laurason Driscoll	7–5, 9–7, 7–5
1932	(United States) George Lott (2) (Canada) Marcel Rainville (2)	(Canada) Walter Martin (Canada) Gilbert Nunns	7–5, 6–4, 4–6, 6–1
1933	(United States) Martin Kenneally (United States) John Murio	(United States) Mel Draga (United States) Wayne Sabin	6–8, 6–4, 8–10, 4–6, 6–3
1934	(United States) Phil Castlen (United States) Hal Surface	(Jamaica) Donald Leahong (Jamaica) Harry Dayes	9–11, 6–4, 6–4, 6–2
1935	(United States) Worth Oswald (United States) Charles Weesner	(United States) Ray Casey (United States) John Law	10–9, 6–2, 10–12, 7–9, 9–7
1936	(United States) Charles Church (United States) Jack Tidball	(United States) Verne Hughes (United States) Bob Hippenstiel	4–6, 4–6, 6–1, 14–12, 6–4
1937	(United States) David M. Jones (Canada) Walter Martin	(Canada) Robert Murray (Canada) Laird Watt	8–6, 9–7, 1–6, 6–2
1938	(United States) Wilmer Allison (2) (United States) Frank Parker	(Canada) Robert Murray (Canada) Laird Watt	6–0, 6–4, 6–8, 6–3
1939	(United States) Frank Froehling Jr. (United States) P. Morey Lewis	(Canada) Bill Pedlar (Canada) Philip Pearson	6–4, 2–6, 6–4, 6–2
1940	(Canada) Philip Pearson (Canada) Ross Wilson	(Canada) Don McDiarmid (Canada) Lewis Duff	11–9, 6–3, 6–3
1941	No competition (due to World War II)		
1942	No competition (due to World War II)		
1943	No competition (due to World War II)		
1944	No competition (due to World War II)		
1945	No competition (due to World War II)		
1946	(Canada) Brendan Macken (Canada) Jim Macken	(Canada) Edgar Murphy (United States) P. Morley Lewis	3–6, 6–1, 6–4, 7–5
1947	(United States) James Evert (United States) Jerry Evert	(United States) Harry Roche (United States) James Livingstone	6–2, 6–3, 9–7
1948	(Canada) Edgar Lanthier (Canada) Gordon McNeil	(United States) Tony Vincent (Norway) Sverre Lie	6–2, 4–6, 3–6, 6–4, 6–4
1949	(Canada) Edgar Lanthier (2) (Canada) Gordon McNeil (2)	(Canada) Walter Stohlberg (Canada) Lorne Main	6–1, 1–6, 6–3, 6–2
1950	(France) Robert Abdesselam (France) Jean Ducos	(Canada) George Robinson (Canada) Henry Rochon	6–3, 6–3, 6–3
1951	(Canada) Brendan Macken (2) (Canada) Lorne Main	(United States) Tony Vincent (United States) Seymour Greenberg	6–0, 6–4, 6–1
1952	(Denmark) Kurt Nielsen (United States) Dick Savitt	(United States) Art Larsen (United States) Noel Brown	6–3, 6–2, 6–3
1953	(Australia) Rex Hartwig (Australia) Mervyn Rose	(Australia) George Worthington (United States) Tony Vincent	7–5, 3–6, 6–3, 6–2
1954	(Chile) Luis Ayala (Canada) Lorne Main (2)	(United States) Bernard Bartzen (United States) Andy Paton Jr.	6–4, 6–4, 6–1
1955	(Canada) Robert Bédard (Canada) Donald Fontana	(Canada) Lawrence Barclay (Canada) Paul Willey	6–4, 8–6, 6–4
1956	(United States) Earl Baumgardner (United States) Noel Brown	(Canada) Robert Bédard (Canada) Donald Fontana	3–6, 6–3, 7–5, 6–4
1957	(Canada) Robert Bédard (2) (Canada) Donald Fontana (2)	(Brazil) Armando Vieira (Brazil) Carlos Fernandez	14–10, 6–3, 12–10
1958	(Australia) Bob Howe (United States) Whitney Reed	(Canada) Robert Bédard (Canada) Donald Fontana	9–7, 7–5, 6–4
1959	(Canada) Robert Bédard (3) (Canada) Donald Fontana (3)	(Cuba) Orlando Garrido (Ecuador) Eduardo Zuleta	6–3, 1–6, 6–3, 2–6, 6–1
1960	(Austria) Ladislav Legenstein (Germany) Peter Scholl	(Australia) Warren Woodcock (United States) Whitney Reed	6–4, 6–3, 6–4
1961	(United States) Whitney Reed (2) (United Kingdom) Mike Sangster	(Canada) Robert Bédard (Canada) Donald Fontana	7–5, 13–11, 4–6, 6–4
1962	(United States) William Hoogs (United States) Jim McManus	(South Africa) Rod Mandelstam (United States) Don Russell	6–1, 3–6, 10–8, 6–2
1963	(Mexico) Marcelo Lara (Mexico) Joaquin Loyo Mayo	(Canada) Keith Carpenter (United States) Tom Brown	4–6, 7–5, 3–6, 7–5, 10–8
1964	(Australia) Roy Emerson (Australia) Fred Stolle	(Australia) Tony Roche (Australia) John Newcombe	3–6, 6–2, 6–2, 6–1
1965	(United States) Ron Holmberg (United States) Lester Sack	(Canada) Robert Bédard (Canada) Donald Fontana	6–2, 3–6, 1–6, 6–3
1966	(Canada) Keith Carpenter (Canada) Michael Carpenter	(United States) Robert Potthast (Australia) Allan Stone	11–9, 4–6, 6–4, 16–14
1967	(Australia) Roy Emerson (2) (Spain) Manuel Santana	(Denmark) Torben Ulrich (India) Jaidip Mukerjea	4–6, 6–2, 6–3
↓ Open era ↓
1968	(Canada) Harry Fauquier (Canada) John Sharpe	(Mexico) Marcelo Lara (India) Jasjit Singh	6–1, 6–3, 4–6, 6–3
1969	(United States) Ron Holmberg (2) (Australia) John Newcombe	(United States) Earl Butch Buchholz (South Africa) Raymond Moore	6–3, 6–4
1970	(Australia) Bill Bowrey (United States) Marty Riessen	(South Africa) Cliff Drysdale (Australia) Fred Stolle	6–3, 6–2
↓ WCT circuit ↓
1971	(Netherlands) Tom Okker (United States) Marty Riessen (2)	(United States) Arthur Ashe (United States) Dennis Ralston	6–3, 6–3, 6–1
↓ Grand Prix circuit ↓
1972	(Romania) Ilie Năstase (Romania) Ion Țiriac	(Czechoslovakia) Jan Kodeš (Czechoslovakia) Jan Kukal	7–6, 6–3
1973	(Australia) Rod Laver (Australia) Ken Rosewall	(Australia) Owen Davidson (Australia) John Newcombe	7–5, 7–6
1974	(Spain) Manuel Orantes (Argentina) Guillermo Vilas	(West Germany) Jürgen Fassbender (West Germany) Hans-Jürgen Pohmann	6–1, 2–6, 6–2
1975	(South Africa) Cliff Drysdale (South Africa) Raymond Moore	(Czechoslovakia) Jan Kodeš (Romania) Ilie Năstase	6–4, 5–7, 7–6
1976	(South Africa) Bob Hewitt (Mexico) Raúl Ramírez	(Spain) Juan Gisbert Sr. (Spain) Manuel Orantes	6–2, 6–1
1977	(South Africa) Bob Hewitt (2) (Mexico) Raúl Ramírez (2)	(United States) Fred McNair (United States) Sherwood Stewart	6–4, 3–6, 6–2
1978	(Poland) Wojtek Fibak (Netherlands) Tom Okker (2)	(Switzerland) Colin Dowdeswell (Switzerland) Heinz Günthardt	6–3, 7–6
1979	(United States) Peter Fleming (United States) John McEnroe	(Switzerland) Heinz Günthardt (South Africa) Bob Hewitt	6–7, 7–6, 6–1
1980	(United States) Bruce Manson (United States) Brian Teacher	(Switzerland) Heinz Günthardt (United States) Sandy Mayer	6–3, 3–6, 6–4
1981	(Mexico) Raúl Ramírez (3) (United States) Ferdi Taygan	(United States) Peter Fleming (United States) John McEnroe	2–6, 7–6, 6–4
1982	(United States) Steve Denton (Australia) Mark Edmondson	(United States) Peter Fleming (United States) John McEnroe	6–7, 7–5, 6–2
1983	(United States) Sandy Mayer (United States) Ferdi Taygan (2)	(United States) Tim Gullikson (United States) Tom Gullikson	6–3, 6–4
1984	(United States) Peter Fleming (2) (United States) John McEnroe (2)	(Australia) John Fitzgerald (Australia) Kim Warwick	6–4, 6–2
1985	(United States) Ken Flach (United States) Robert Seguso	(Sweden) Stefan Edberg (Sweden) Anders Järryd	5–7, 7–6, 6–3
1986	(United States) Chip Hooper (United States) Mike Leach	(West Germany) Boris Becker (Socialist Federal Republic of Yugoslavia) Slobodan Živojinović	6–7, 6–3, 6–3
1987	(Australia) Pat Cash (Sweden) Stefan Edberg	(Australia) Peter Doohan (Australia) Laurie Warder	6–7, 6–3, 6–4
1988	(United States) Ken Flach (2) (United States) Robert Seguso (2)	(United Kingdom) Andrew Castle (United States) Tim Wilkison	7–6^{(7–3)}, 6–3
1989	(New Zealand) Kelly Evernden (United States) Todd Witsken	(United States) Charles Beckman (United States) Shelby Cannon	6–3, 6–3
↓ ATP Masters 1000 ↓
1990	(United States) Paul Annacone (United States) David Wheaton	(Australia) Broderick Dyke (Sweden) Peter Lundgren	6–1, 7–6
1991	(United States) Patrick Galbraith (United States) Todd Witsken (2)	(Canada) Grant Connell (Canada) Glenn Michibata	6–4, 3–6, 6–1
1992	(United States) Patrick Galbraith (2) (South Africa) Danie Visser	(United States) Andre Agassi (United States) John McEnroe	6–4, 6–4
1993	(United States) Jim Courier (The Bahamas) Mark Knowles	(Canada) Glenn Michibata (United States) David Pate	6–4, 7–6
1994	(Zimbabwe) Byron Black (United States) Jonathan Stark	(United States) Patrick McEnroe (United States) Jared Palmer	6–4, 6–4
1995	(Russia) Yevgeny Kafelnikov (Russia) Andrei Olhovskiy	(United States) Brian MacPhie (Australia) Sandon Stolle	6–2, 6–2
1996	(United States) Patrick Galbraith (3) (Netherlands) Paul Haarhuis	(The Bahamas) Mark Knowles (Canada) Daniel Nestor	7–6, 6–3
1997	(India) Mahesh Bhupathi (India) Leander Paes	(Canada) Sébastien Lareau (United States) Alex O'Brien	7–6, 6–3
1998	(Czech Republic) Martin Damm (United States) Jim Grabb	(South Africa) Ellis Ferreira (United States) Rick Leach	6–7, 6–2, 7–6
1999	(Sweden) Jonas Björkman (Australia) Patrick Rafter	(Zimbabwe) Byron Black (South Africa) Wayne Ferreira	7–6^{(7–5)}, 6–4
2000	(Canada) Sébastien Lareau (Canada) Daniel Nestor	(Australia) Joshua Eagle (Australia) Andrew Florent	6–3, 7–6^{(7–3)}
2001	(Czech Republic) Jiří Novák (Czech Republic) David Rikl	(United States) Donald Johnson (United States) Jared Palmer	6–4, 3–6, 6–3
2002	(United States) Bob Bryan (United States) Mike Bryan	(The Bahamas) Mark Knowles (Canada) Daniel Nestor	4–6, 7–6^{(7–1)}, 6–3
2003	(India) Mahesh Bhupathi (2) (Belarus) Max Mirnyi	(Sweden) Jonas Björkman (Australia) Todd Woodbridge	6–3, 7–6^{(7–4)}
2004	(India) Mahesh Bhupathi (3) (India) Leander Paes (2)	(Sweden) Jonas Björkman (Belarus) Max Mirnyi	6–4, 6–2
2005	(Zimbabwe) Wayne Black (Zimbabwe) Kevin Ullyett	(Israel) Jonathan Erlich (Israel) Andy Ram	6–7^{(5–7)}, 6–3, 6–0
2006	(United States) Bob Bryan (2) (United States) Mike Bryan (2)	(Australia) Paul Hanley (Zimbabwe) Kevin Ullyett	6–3, 7–5
2007	(India) Mahesh Bhupathi (4) (Czech Republic) Pavel Vízner	(Australia) Paul Hanley (Zimbabwe) Kevin Ullyett	6–4, 6–4
2008	(Canada) Daniel Nestor (2) (Serbia) Nenad Zimonjić	(United States) Bob Bryan (United States) Mike Bryan	6–2, 4–6, [10–6]
2009	(India) Mahesh Bhupathi (5) (The Bahamas) Mark Knowles (2)	(Belarus) Max Mirnyi (Israel) Andy Ram	6–4, 6–3
2010	(United States) Bob Bryan (3) (United States) Mike Bryan (3)	(France) Julien Benneteau (France) Michaël Llodra	7–5, 6–3
2011	(France) Michaël Llodra (Serbia) Nenad Zimonjić (2)	(United States) Bob Bryan (United States) Mike Bryan	6–4, 6–7^{(5–7)}, [10–5]
2012	(United States) Bob Bryan (4) (United States) Mike Bryan (4)	(Spain) Marcel Granollers (Spain) Marc López	6–1, 4–6, [12–10]
2013	(Austria) Alexander Peya (Brazil) Bruno Soares	(United Kingdom) Colin Fleming (United Kingdom) Andy Murray	6–4, 7–6^{(7–4)}
2014	(Austria) Alexander Peya (2) (Brazil) Bruno Soares (2)	(Croatia) Ivan Dodig (Brazil) Marcelo Melo	6–4, 6–3
2015	(United States) Bob Bryan (5) (United States) Mike Bryan (5)	(Canada) Daniel Nestor (France) Édouard Roger-Vasselin	7–6^{(7–5)}, 3–6, [10–6]
2016	(Croatia) Ivan Dodig (Brazil) Marcelo Melo	(United Kingdom) Jamie Murray (Brazil) Bruno Soares	6–4, 6–4
2017	(France) Pierre-Hugues Herbert (France) Nicolas Mahut	(India) Rohan Bopanna (Croatia) Ivan Dodig	6–4, 3–6, [10–6]
2018	(Finland) Henri Kontinen (Australia) John Peers	(South Africa) Raven Klaasen (New Zealand) Michael Venus	6–2, 6–7^{(7–9)}, [10–6]
2019	(Spain) Marcel Granollers (Argentina) Horacio Zeballos	(Netherlands) Robin Haase (Netherlands) Wesley Koolhof	7–5, 7–5
2020	No competition (due to COVID-19 pandemic)		
2021	(United States) Rajeev Ram (United Kingdom) Joe Salisbury	(Croatia) Nikola Mektić (Croatia) Mate Pavić	6–3, 4–6, [10–3]
2022	(Netherlands) Wesley Koolhof (United Kingdom) Neal Skupski	(United Kingdom) Dan Evans (Australia) John Peers	6–2, 4–6, [10–6]
2023	(El Salvador) Marcelo Arévalo (Netherlands) Jean-Julien Rojer	(United States) Rajeev Ram (United Kingdom) Joe Salisbury	6–3, 6–1
2024	(Spain) Marcel Granollers (2) (Argentina) Horacio Zeballos (2)	(United States) Rajeev Ram (United Kingdom) Joe Salisbury	6–2, 7–6^{(7–4)}
2025	(United Kingdom) Julian Cash (United Kingdom) Lloyd Glasspool	(United Kingdom) Joe Salisbury (United Kingdom) Neal Skupski	6–3, 6–7^{(5–7)}, [13–11]
2026	(Brazil) Orlando Luz (Brazil) Rafael Matos	(El Salvador) Marcelo Arévalo (Croatia) Mate Pavić	5–7, 6–4, [10–6]

=== Women's doubles ===
Year	Champions	Runners-up	Score
1968	(Canada) Vicki Berner (Canada) Faye Urban	(Canada) Jane O'Hara (Canada) Vivienne Strong	6–2, 6–3
1969	(Canada) Vicki Berner (Canada) Faye Urban (2)	(Canada) Jane O'Hara (Canada) Vivienne Strong	6–1, 6–1
1970	(United States) Rosemary Casals (Australia) Margaret Court	(Australia) Helen Gourlay (South Africa) Patricia Walkden	6–0, 6–1
1971	(United States) Rosemary Casals (2) (France) Françoise Dürr	(Australia) Evonne Goolagong (Australia) Lesley Turner Bowrey	6–3, 6–3
1972	(Australia) Margaret Court (2) (Australia) Evonne Goolagong	(South Africa) Brenda Kirk (South Africa) Patricia Walkden	3–6, 6–3, 7–5
1973	(Australia) Evonne Goolagong (2) (United States) Peggy Michel	(West Germany) Helga Niessen Masthoff (Czechoslovakia) Martina Navratilova	6–3, 6–2
1974	(United States) Julie Heldman (France) Gail Sherriff Chanfreau	(United States) Chris Evert (United States) Jeanne Evert	6–3, 6–4
1975	(United States) Julie Anthony (Australia) Margaret Court (3)	(United States) JoAnne Russell (United States) Jane Stratton	6–2, 6–4
1976	(United States) Janet Newberry (Australia) Cynthia Doerner	(United Kingdom) Sue Barker (United States) Pam Teeguarden	6–7, 6–3, 6–1
1977	(South Africa) Delina Boshoff (South Africa) Ilana Kloss	(United States) Rosemary Casals (Australia) Evonne Goolagong Cawley	6–2, 6–3
1978	(Czechoslovakia) Regina Maršíková (United States) Pam Teeguarden	(Australia) Chris O'Neil (United States) Paula Smith	5–7, 6–4, 6–2
1979	(United States) Lea Antonoplis (Australia) Diane Evers	(Australia) Chris O'Neil (Sweden) Mimmi Wikstedt	2–6, 6–1, 6–3
1980	(United States) Andrea Jaeger (Czechoslovakia) Regina Maršíková (2)	(United States) Ann Kiyomura (United States) Betsy Nagelsen	6–1, 6–3
1981	(United States) Martina Navratilova (United States) Pam Shriver	(United States) Candy Reynolds (United States) Anne Smith	7–6, 7–6
1982	(United States) Martina Navratilova (2) (United States) Candy Reynolds	(United States) Barbara Potter (United States) Sharon Walsh	6–4, 6–4
1983	(United Kingdom) Anne Hobbs (United States) Andrea Jaeger (2)	(South Africa) Rosalyn Fairbank (United States) Candy Reynolds	6–4, 5–7, 7–5
1984	(United States) Kathy Jordan (Australia) Elizabeth Sayers	(West Germany) Claudia Kohde-Kilsch (Czechoslovakia) Hana Mandlíková	6–1, 6–2
1985	(United States) Gigi Fernández (United States) Martina Navratilova (3)	(Netherlands) Marcella Mesker (France) Pascale Paradis	6–4, 6–0
1986	(United States) Zina Garrison (Argentina) Gabriela Sabatini	(United States) Pam Shriver (Czechoslovakia) Helena Suková	7–6^{(7–2)}, 5–7, 6–4
1987	(United States) Zina Garrison (2) (United States) Lori McNeil	(West Germany) Claudia Kohde-Kilsch (Czechoslovakia) Helena Suková	6–1, 6–2
1988	(Czechoslovakia) Jana Novotná (Czechoslovakia) Helena Suková	(United States) Zina Garrison (United States) Pam Shriver	7–6^{(7–2)}, 7–6^{(8–6)}
1989	(United States) Gigi Fernández (2) (United States) Robin White	(United States) Martina Navratilova (Soviet Union) Larisa Neiland	6–1, 7–5
1990	(United States) Betsy Nagelsen (Argentina) Gabriela Sabatini (2)	(Canada) Helen Kelesi (Italy) Raffaella Reggi	3–6, 6–2, 6–2
1991	(Soviet Union) Larisa Neiland (Soviet Union) Natalia Zvereva	(West Germany) Claudia Kohde-Kilsch (Czechoslovakia) Helena Suková	1–6, 7–5, 6–2
1992	(United States) Lori McNeil (2) (Australia) Rennae Stubbs	(United States) Gigi Fernández (Commonwealth of Independent States) Natalia Zvereva	3–6, 7–5, 7–5
1993	(Latvia) Larisa Neiland (2) (Czech Republic) Jana Novotná (2)	(Spain) Arantxa Sánchez Vicario (Czechoslovakia) Helena Suková	6–1, 6–2
1994	(United States) Meredith McGrath (Spain) Arantxa Sánchez Vicario	(United States) Pam Shriver (Australia) Elizabeth Sayers Smylie	2–6, 6–2, 6–4
1995	(Argentina) Gabriela Sabatini (3) (Netherlands) Brenda Schultz-McCarthy	(Switzerland) Martina Hingis (Croatia) Iva Majoli	4–6, 6–0, 6–3
1996	(Spain) Arantxa Sánchez Vicario (2) (Latvia) Larisa Neiland (3)	(United States) Mary Joe Fernández (Czechoslovakia) Helena Suková	7–6^{(7–1)}, 6–1
1997	(Indonesia) Yayuk Basuki (Netherlands) Caroline Vis	(United States) Nicole Arendt (Netherlands) Manon Bollegraf	3–6, 7–5, 6–4
1998	(Switzerland) Martina Hingis (Czech Republic) Jana Novotná (3)	(Indonesia) Yayuk Basuki (Netherlands) Caroline Vis	6–3, 6–4
1999	(Czech Republic) Jana Novotná (4) (France) Mary Pierce	(Latvia) Larisa Neiland (Spain) Arantxa Sánchez Vicario	6–3, 2–6, 6–3
2000	(Switzerland) Martina Hingis (2) (France) Nathalie Tauziat	(France) Julie Halard-Decugis (Japan) Ai Sugiyama	6–3, 3–6, 6–4
2001	(United States) Kimberly Po-Messerli (Australia) Nicole Pratt	(Slovenia) Tina Križan (Slovenia) Katarina Srebotnik	6–3, 6–1
2002	(Spain) Virginia Ruano Pascual (Argentina) Paola Suárez	(Japan) Rika Fujiwara (Japan) Ai Sugiyama	6–4, 7–6^{(7–4)}
2003	(Russia) Svetlana Kuznetsova (United States) Martina Navratilova (4)	(Venezuela) María Vento-Kabchi (Indonesia) Angelique Widjaja	3–6, 6–1, 6–1
2004	(Japan) Shinobu Asagoe (Japan) Ai Sugiyama	(South Africa) Liezel Horn Huber (Thailand) Tamarine Tanasugarn	6–0, 6–3
2005	(Germany) Anna-Lena Grönefeld (United States) Martina Navratilova (5)	(Spain) Conchita Martínez (Spain) Virginia Ruano Pascual	5–7, 6–3, 6–4
2006	(United States) Martina Navratilova (6) (Russia) Nadia Petrova	(Zimbabwe) Cara Black (Germany) Anna-Lena Grönefeld	6–1, 6–2
2007	(Slovenia) Katarina Srebotnik (Japan) Ai Sugiyama (2)	(Zimbabwe) Cara Black (United States) Liezel Horn Huber	6–4, 2–6, [10–5]
2008	(Zimbabwe) Cara Black (United States) Liezel Horn Huber	(Russia) Maria Kirilenko (Italy) Flavia Pennetta	6–1, 6–1
2009	(Spain) Nuria Llagostera Vives (Spain) María José Martínez Sánchez	(Australia) Samantha Stosur (Australia) Rennae Stubbs	2–6, 7–5, [11–9]
2010	(Argentina) Gisela Dulko (Italy) Flavia Pennetta	(Czech Republic) Květa Peschke (Slovenia) Katarina Srebotnik	7–5, 3–6, [12–10]
2011	(United States) Liezel Huber (2) (United States) Lisa Raymond	(Belarus) Victoria Azarenka (Russia) Maria Kirilenko	(walkover)
2012	(Poland) Klaudia Jans-Ignacik (France) Kristina Mladenovic	(Russia) Nadia Petrova (Slovenia) Katarina Srebotnik	7–5, 2–6, [10–7]
2013	(Serbia) Jelena Janković (Slovenia) Katarina Srebotnik (2)	(Germany) Anna-Lena Grönefeld (Czech Republic) Květa Peschke	5–7, 6–2, [10–6]
2014	(Italy) Sara Errani (Italy) Roberta Vinci	(Zimbabwe) Cara Black (India) Sania Mirza	7–6^{(7–4)}, 6–3
2015	(United States) Bethanie Mattek-Sands (Czech Republic) Lucie Šafářová	(France) Caroline Garcia (Slovenia) Katarina Srebotnik	6–1, 6–2
2016	(Russia) Ekaterina Makarova (Russia) Elena Vesnina	(Romania) Simona Halep (Romania) Monica Niculescu	6–3, 7–6^{(7–5)}
2017	(Russia) Ekaterina Makarova (2) (Russia) Elena Vesnina (2)	(Germany) Anna-Lena Grönefeld (Czech Republic) Květa Peschke	6–0, 6–4
2018	(Australia) Ashleigh Barty (Netherlands) Demi Schuurs	(Chinese Taipei) Latisha Chan (Russia) Ekaterina Makarova	4–6, 6–3, [10–8]
2019	(Czech Republic) Barbora Krejčíková (Czech Republic) Kateřina Siniaková	(Germany) Anna-Lena Grönefeld (Netherlands) Demi Schuurs	7–5, 6–0
2020	No competition (due to COVID-19 pandemic)		
2021	(Canada) Gabriela Dabrowski (Brazil) Luisa Stefani	(Croatia) Darija Jurak (Slovenia) Andreja Klepač	6–3, 6–4
2022	(United States) Coco Gauff (United States) Jessica Pegula	(United States) Nicole Melichar-Martinez (Australia) Ellen Perez	6–4, 6–7^{(5–7)}, [10–5]
2023	(Japan) Shuko Aoyama (Japan) Ena Shibahara	(United States) Desirae Krawczyk (Netherlands) Demi Schuurs	6–4, 4–6, [13–11]
2024	(United States) Desirae Krawczyk (United States) Caroline Dolehide	(Canada) Gabriela Dabrowski (New Zealand) Erin Routliffe	7–6^{(7–2)}, 3–6, [10–7]
2025	(United States) Coco Gauff (2) (United States) McCartney Kessler	(United States) Taylor Townsend (China) Zhang Shuai	6–4, 1–6, [13–11]
2026	(Czech Republic) Kateřina Siniaková (2) (China) Zhang Shuai	(Italy) Sara Errani (United States) Nicole Melichar-Martinez	6–3, 6–4

== Records ==
Source: The Tennis Base

=== Men's singles ===
Most titles	(Czechoslovakia) Ivan Lendl	6
Most finals	(Czechoslovakia) Ivan Lendl	9
Most consecutive titles	(Canada) Charles Smith Hyman (1886–1889)	4
Most consecutive finals	(Canada) Charles Smith Hyman (1886–1889)	4
Most consecutive finals	(United States) Beals Wright (1901–1904)	4
Most consecutive finals	(Canada) James F. Foulkes (1907–1910)	4
Most matches played	(Czechoslovakia) Ivan Lendl	66
Most matches won	(Czechoslovakia) Ivan Lendl	57
Most consecutive matches won	(Czechoslovakia) Ivan Lendl	18
Most editions played	(Canada) Robert Bédard	17
Best winning %	(United States) Frank Parker	100%
Youngest champion	(United States) Frank Parker	16y, 5m, 25d (1932)
Oldest champion	(Canada) James F. Foulkes	38y, 3m, 23d (1910)

Longest final
1925 (64 games)
(Canada) Willard Crocker	4	7	18	6
(United States) Wallace Scott	6	5	16	2

Shortest final
1977 (13 games)
(United States) Jeff Borowiak	6	6
(Chile) Jaime Fillol	0	1

== See also ==
- Category:National and multi-national tennis tournaments

Awards and achievements
Preceded by Indian Wells	Favorite WTA Tier I – II Tournament; 1998–2000	Succeeded by Dubai
