= 1970 Rothmans Canadian Open =

- Date: August 12–18 (men); August 19–25 (women)
- Edition: 81st
- Surface: Clay / outdoor
- Location: Toronto, Ontario, Canada
- Venue: Toronto Cricket Skating and Curling Club

Champions

Men's singles
- (Australia) Rod Laver

Women's singles
- (Australia) Margaret Court

Men's doubles
- (Australia) William Bowrey / (United States) Marty Riessen

Women's doubles
- (United States) Rosemary Casals / (Australia) Margaret Court
- Canadian Open

The 1970 Rothmans Canadian Open was a tennis tournament played on outdoor clay courts at the Toronto Cricket Skating and Curling Club in Toronto in Canada that was part of the 1970 Pepsi-Cola Grand Prix. The men's tournament was held from August 12 through August 18, 1970, while the women's tournament was played from August 19 through August 25, 1970.

== Finals ==
=== Men's singles ===
(Australia) Rod Laver defeated (United Kingdom) Roger Taylor 6–0, 4–6, 6–3

- It was Laver's 6th professional title of the year and the 17th of his career.

=== Women's singles ===
(Australia) Margaret Court defeated (United States) Rosemary Casals 6–8, 6–4, 6–4

- It was Court's 27th professional title of the year and the 77th of her career.

=== Men's doubles ===
(Australia) Bill Bowrey / (United States) Marty Riessen defeated (South Africa) Cliff Drysdale / (Australia) Fred Stolle 6–3, 6–2

- It was Bowrey's 2nd title of the year and the 4th of his career. It was Riessen's 3rd title of the year and the 8th of his professional career.

=== Women's doubles ===
(United States) Rosemary Casals / (Australia) Margaret Court defeated (Australia) Helen Gourlay / (South Africa) Pat Walkden 6–0, 6–1

- It was Casals' 6th title of the year and the 13th of her career. It was Court's 28th professional title of the year and the 78th of her career.
