= 1976 Rothmans Canadian Open =

- Date: August 16–22
- Edition: 87th
- Surface: Clay / outdoor
- Location: Toronto, Ontario, Canada
- Venue: National Tennis Centre

Champions

Men's singles
- (Argentina) Guillermo Vilas

Women's singles
- (Socialist Federal Republic of Yugoslavia) Mima Jaušovec

Men's doubles
- (South Africa) Bob Hewitt / (Mexico) Raúl Ramírez

Women's doubles
- (Australia) Cynthia Doerner / (United States) Janet Newberry
- Canadian Open

The 1976 Rothmans Canadian Open was a tennis tournament played on outdoor clay courts at the National Tennis Centre in Toronto in Canada that was part of the 1976 Commercial Union Assurance Grand Prix and of the 1976 WTA Tour. The tournament was held from August 16 through August 22, 1976.

== Finals ==
=== Men's singles ===
(Argentina) Guillermo Vilas defeated (Poland) Wojciech Fibak 6–4, 7–6, 6–2

- It was Vilas' 4th title of the year and the 25th of his career.

=== Women's singles ===
(Socialist Federal Republic of Yugoslavia) Mima Jaušovec defeated (Australia) Lesley Hunt 6–2, 6–0

- It was Jaušovec's 2nd title of the year and the 2nd of her career.

=== Men's doubles ===
(South Africa) Bob Hewitt / (Mexico) Raúl Ramírez defeated (Spain) Juan Gisbert Sr. / (Spain) Manuel Orantes 6–2, 6–1

- It was Hewitt's 3rd title of the year and the 27th of his career. It was Ramírez's 15th title of the year and the 42nd of his career.

=== Women's doubles ===
(Australia) Cynthia Doerner / (United States) Janet Newberry defeated / by walkover

- It was Doerner's 1st title of the year and the 1st of her career. It was Newberry's 1st title of the year and the 1st of her career.
