= 1972 Rothmans Canadian Open =

- Date: August 14–20
- Edition: 83rd
- Category: Grand Prix (A/D grade)
- Surface: Clay / outdoor
- Location: Toronto, Ontario, Canada
- Venue: Toronto Cricket Skating and Curling Club

Champions

Men's singles
- (Romania) Ilie Năstase

Women's singles
- (Australia) Evonne Goolagong

Men's doubles
- (Romania) Ilie Năstase / (Romania) Ion Țiriac

Women's doubles
- (Australia) Margaret Court / (Australia) Evonne Goolagong
- Canadian Open

The 1972 Rothmans Canadian Open was a tennis tournament played on outdoor clay courts at the Toronto Cricket Skating and Curling Club in Toronto in Canada that was part of the 1972 Commercial Union Assurance Grand Prix The men's tournament was categorized as a Grade A tournament, the second-highest category, while the women's competition was a Grade D event. The tournament was held from August 14 through August 20, 1972. Ilie Năstase and Evonne Goolagong won the singles titles.

== Finals ==
=== Men's singles ===
(Romania) Ilie Năstase defeated (Rhodesia) Andrew Pattison 6–4, 6–3

- It was Năstase's 12th title of the year and the 28th of his career.

=== Women's singles ===
(Australia) Evonne Goolagong defeated (United Kingdom) Virginia Wade 6–3, 6–1

- It was Goolagong's 8th title of the year and the 27th of her career.

=== Men's doubles ===
(Romania) Ilie Năstase / (Romania) Ion Țiriac defeated (Czechoslovakia) Jan Kodeš / (Czechoslovakia) Jan Kukal 7–6, 6–3

- It was Năstase's 13th title of the year and the 29th of his career. It was Țiriac's 4th title of the year and the 10th of his career.

=== Women's doubles ===
(Australia) Margaret Court / (Australia) Evonne Goolagong defeated (South Africa) Brenda Kirk / (South Africa) Pat Walkden 3–6, 6–3, 7–5

- It was Court's 4th title of the year and the 94th of her career. It was Goolagong's 9th title of the year and the 28th of her career.
