= Marcie Louie =

American tennis player

- Full name: Marcelyn Louie
- Country (sports): United States
- Born: September 10, 1953 (age 72) San Francisco, United States
- Plays: Right-handed
- Prize money: US$ 14,518

Singles

Grand Slam singles results
- Australian Open: 1R (1980)
- French Open: 1R (1977)
- Wimbledon: 3R (1972)
- US Open: 4R (1976)

Doubles

Grand Slam doubles results
- Wimbledon: 2R (1979)
- US Open: 2R (1971)

Marcelyn J. Louie (born 10 September 10, 1953) is an American former professional tennis player.

== Biography ==
Born in San Francisco, Louie is a Chinese-American and one of five children. Her father Ronald was a kung fu instructor. The youngest sister in the family, Mareen (better known as Peanut), was also a professional tennis player, while the three other siblings played tennis at college level.

Louie, who wore glasses on court, turned professional in 1972 and played at Wimbledon for the first time that year, where she scored a 10–8 third set win over Julie Heldman en route to the third round.

In 1975 she had a win over Margaret Court at the Family Circle Cup on Amelia Island and won her biggest career title at the Canadian Open, defeating Laura DuPont in the final.

Her best performance in a grand slam tournament was a fourth round appearance at the 1976 US Open. She defeated Janice Metcalf, Julie Anthony and Jackie Fayter, before having to retire hurt while trailing Mima Jaušovec in their fourth round encounter, suffering from a wrist injury.

== WTA Tour titles ==
=== Singles (1) ===
Result	Date	Tournament	Surface	Opponent	Score
Win	August, 1975	Toronto, Canada	Clay	(United States) Laura DuPont	6–1, 4–6, 6–4
