= 1979 Player's Canadian Open =

- Date: August 13–19
- Edition: 90th
- Surface: Hard / outdoor
- Location: Toronto, Ontario, Canada
- Venue: National Tennis Centre

Champions

Men's singles
- (Sweden) Björn Borg

Women's singles
- (United States) Laura DuPont

Men's doubles
- (United States) Peter Fleming / (United States) John McEnroe

Women's doubles
- (United States) Lea Antonoplis / (Australia) Diane Evers
- Canadian Open

The 1979 Player's International Canadian Open was a combined men's end women's professional tennis tournament played on outdoor hard courts at the National Tennis Centre in Toronto in Canada that was part of the 1979 Colgate-Palmolive Grand Prix and of the 1979 WTA Tour. It was the 90th edition of the tournament and was held from August 13 through August 19, 1979. Björn Borg and Laura DuPont won the singles titles.

== Finals ==
=== Men's singles ===
(Sweden) Björn Borg defeated (United States) John McEnroe 6–3, 6–3

- It was Borg's 9th singles title of the year and the 48th of his career.

=== Women's singles ===
(United States) Laura DuPont defeated (South Africa) Brigitte Cuypers 6–4, 6–7, 6–1

- It was DuPont's 1st title of the year and the 1st of her career.

=== Men's doubles ===
(United States) Peter Fleming / (United States) John McEnroe defeated (Switzerland) Heinz Günthardt / (South Africa) Bob Hewitt 6–7, 7–6, 6–1

- It was Fleming's 10th title of the year and the 17th of his career. It was McEnroe's 17th title of the year and the 28th of his career.

=== Women's doubles ===
(United States) Lea Antonoplis / (Australia) Diane Evers defeated (Australia) Chris O'Neil / (Sweden) Mimmi Wikstedt 2–6, 6–1, 6–3

- It was Antonoplis' 1st title of the year and the 1st of her career. It was Evers' 1st title of the year and the 1st of her career.

== See also ==
- Borg–McEnroe rivalry
