= Violet Summerhayes =

Canadian tennis player (1878–1974)

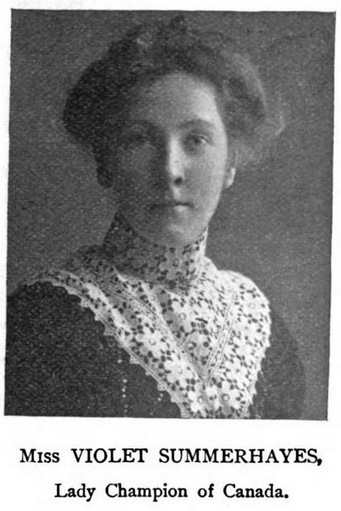
Violet Summerhayes, from a 1902 publication.

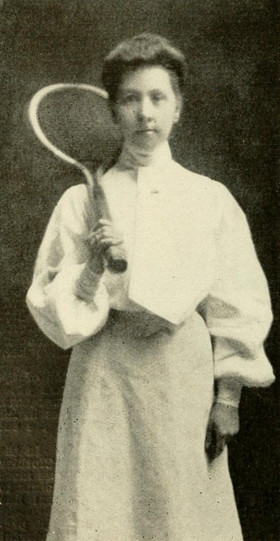
Violet Summerhayes, from a 1906 publication.

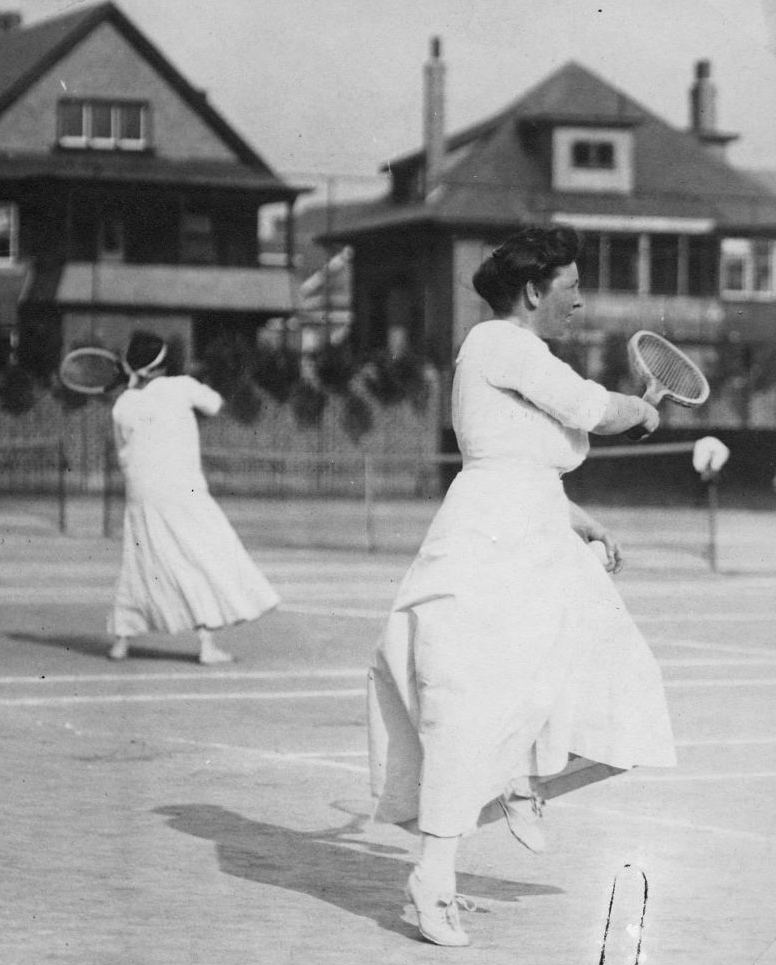
Violet Summerhayes in action, circa 1908.

Violet Summerhayes (May 31, 1878 – 1974) was an English-born Canadian tennis player in the early twentieth century. She won the Rogers Cup championship from 1899 to 1905.

== Early life ==
Violet Marian Summerhayes was born in England and raised in Toronto, Ontario. Her father William F. Summerhayes was a barrister and tennis supporter. She developed her tennis skills with her siblings, at the St. Matthew's Church Tennis Club in Riverdale. She also trained as a kindergarten assistant in Toronto, passing the government examination in 1896.

== Career ==
Summerhayes dominated Canadian women's tennis at the turn into the twentieth century, with seven singles wins at the Canadian Open. She won the International Championship Ladies' Singles event at Niagara in 1905. She competed at Beckenham and Wimbledon in 1907, and at Niagara again in 1908 and 1909.

Summerhays competed in women's doubles with Myrtle McAteer at Niagara in 1903 and mixed doubles in 1909. A "Miss Summerhayes" was reported as competing in women's doubles at Toronto in 1920.

Summerhayes' streak of four consecutive Rogers Cup victories stood as a record for almost a century, until Monica Seles tied the record.

== Personal life ==
Violet Summerhayes appears in the Toronto City Directory in 1928 in connection with the Women's Auxiliary to the Church of England Missionary Society. She died in 1974, aged 96 years, in Toronto.
