= 1978 Rothmans Canadian Open =

- Date: August 14–20
- Edition: 89th
- Surface: Clay / outdoor
- Location: Toronto, Ontario, Canada
- Venue: National Tennis Centre

Champions

Men's singles
- (United States) Eddie Dibbs

Women's singles
- (Czechoslovakia) Regina Maršíková

Men's doubles
- (Poland) Wojciech Fibak / (Netherlands) Tom Okker

Women's doubles
- (Czechoslovakia) Regina Maršíková / (United States) Pam Teeguarden
- Canadian Open

The 1978 Rothmans Canadian Open was a tennis tournament played on outdoor clay courts at the National Tennis Centre in Toronto in Canada that was part of the 1978 Colgate-Palmolive Grand Prix and of the 1978 WTA Tour. The tournament was held from August 14 through August 20, 1978.

== Finals ==
=== Men's singles ===
(United States) Eddie Dibbs defeated (Argentina) José Luis Clerc 5–7, 6–4, 6–1

- It was Dibbs' 4th title of the year and the 18th of his career.

=== Women's singles ===
(Czechoslovakia) Regina Maršíková defeated (Romania) Virginia Ruzici 7–5, 6–7^{(9–11)}, 6–2

- It was Maršíková's 2nd title of the year and the 3rd of her career.

=== Men's doubles ===
(Poland) Wojciech Fibak / (Netherlands) Tom Okker defeated (Switzerland) Colin Dowdeswell / (Switzerland) Heinz Günthardt 6–3, 7–6

- It was Fibak's 6th title of the year and the 33rd of his career. It was Okker's 6th title of the year and the 77th of his career.

=== Women's doubles ===
(Czechoslovakia) Regina Maršíková / (United States) Pam Teeguarden defeated (Australia) Chris O'Neil / (United States) Paula Smith 7–5, 6–7, 6–2

- It was Maršíková's 3rd title of the year and the 4th of her career. It was Teeguarden's only title of the year and 15th of her career.
