= John Murio =

American tennis player (1901 – 1986)

- Full name: John Keloha Murio
- Country (sports): USA
- Born: 4 July 1901 Hawaii, United States
- Died: 1 July 1986 (aged 84) San Francisco, California, United States
- Retired: 1950

Singles
- Career titles: 20+

John Murio (1901 – 1986) was an American tennis player in the 1920s and 1930s.

== Career ==
Murio won many tournaments and despite being among the "best known national and international tennis stars of the late 1920s and 1930s", he never entered the US championships. Murio won the Oregon state title in 1931 (dropping just one game in three sets in the final) and 1934. In 1933 Murio won the Canadian championships beating Walter Martin in five sets in the final. "It was the Hawaiian's persistent, stubborn play, backed with deadly accuracy and a flock of strokes that did the trick". Murio won the 1934 Washington state title, beating Worth Oswald in the final, and won the title again in 1936. He also won the Pacific Northwest championships in 1931 and 1936, the British Columbia championships in 1933 and 1936, the British Columbia clay court title in 1933, British Columbia indoor title in 1934, the Western Canada grass court title in 1935 and won many tournaments in California including the San Francisco city tennis championships nine times. He had wins over Don Budge and Bobby Riggs during his career. He ran a sporting goods store and later a bar and was married and had three children.
