= 1974 Rothmans Canadian Open =

- Date: August 12–18
- Edition: 85th
- Surface: Clay / outdoor
- Location: Toronto, Ontario, Canada
- Venue: Toronto Cricket Skating and Curling Club

Champions

Men's singles
- (Argentina) Guillermo Vilas

Women's singles
- (United States) Chris Evert

Men's doubles
- (Spain) Manuel Orantes / (Argentina) Guillermo Vilas

Women's doubles
- (France) Gail Chanfreau / (United States) Julie Heldman
- Canadian Open

The 1974 Rothmans Canadian Open was a tennis tournament played on outdoor clay courts at the Toronto Cricket Skating and Curling Club in Toronto in Canada that was part of the 1974 Commercial Union Assurance Grand Prix and of the 1974 WTA Tour. The tournament was held from August 12 through August 18, 1974.

== Finals ==
=== Men's singles ===
(Argentina) Guillermo Vilas defeated (Spain) Manuel Orantes 6–4, 6–2, 6–3

- It was Vilas' 5th title of the year and the 7th of his career.

=== Women's singles ===
(United States) Chris Evert defeated (United States) Julie Heldman 6–0, 6–3

- It was Evert's 16th title of the year and the 36th of her career.

=== Men's doubles ===
(Spain) Manuel Orantes / (Argentina) Guillermo Vilas defeated (West Germany) Jürgen Fassbender / (West Germany) Hans-Jürgen Pohmann 6–1, 2–6, 6–2

- It was Orantes' 3rd title of the year and the 23rd of his career. It was Vilas' 6th title of the year and the 8th of his career.

=== Women's doubles ===
(France) Gail Chanfreau / (United States) Julie Heldman defeated (United States) Chris Evert / (United States) Jeanne Evert 6–3, 6–4

- It was Chanfreau's 1st title of the year and the 1st of her career. It was Heldman's 1st title of the year and the 1st of her career.
