= Don McDiarmid =

Canadian tennis player

Donald Stuart McDiarmid (21 November 1915 – 3 February 2002) was the Canadian men's national tennis champion in 1940. In 1941, he was ranked the country's number one men's player by the Canadian Lawn Tennis Association. He held number one rankings in the province of Ontario from 1939 to 1949. In 1946, he became the first Ottawa-born member of the Canada Davis Cup team. With his tennis career interrupted by the Second World War, McDiarmid enlisted in the Royal Canadian Air Force and became a wartime overseas sports ambassador for his country.

== Early life ==
McDiarmid was born in Ottawa on 21 November 1915, the third youngest of nine siblings. His parents, who lived in Ottawa's Britannia area, were Collas Arthur McDiarmid, a carpenter and contractor, and Jean Mackenzie (née Woods) McDiarmid, who was prominent in the Britannia United church and its women's association.

Along with learning carpentry skills from his father, by the age of 14 McDiarmid had developed a keen interest in tennis. He would borrow racquets and balls from his older siblings, many of whom were strong local players, and would sneak through a hole in the fence at the Ottawa West Tennis Club (now Tennis Centre West Ottawa).

In the 1930s, he initially played in Ottawa's Britannia area at the Britannia Heights Tennis Club, and the Britannia Boating Club (now the Britannia Yacht Club), where his siblings played. He then joined the Ottawa Tennis and Lawn Bowling Club, in Old Ottawa South, before switching permanently to the Rideau Lawn Tennis Club (now the Rideau Sports Centre), in Gloucester (now Overbrook).

== Pre-War tennis career ==
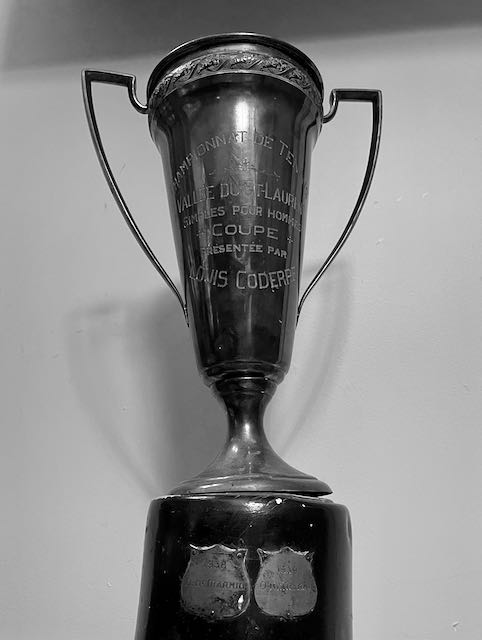
Trophy for the Championnat de Tennis Vallée du St-Laurent, in Quebec, won by McDiarmid in 1938 and 1939.

In October 1935, playing for Nepean High School, McDiarmid won singles matches in straight sets against Commerce High School and Ottawa University, and was reported as an outstanding player. From 1938 onward, McDiarmid won the Ottawa open (now the National Capital Tennis Association City Championships) five times—1938, 1941, and 1946-48 (the tournament was suspended from 1942 to 1945).

By October 1939, McDiarmid was ranked the province's number one men's player by the Ontario Tennis Association. By 1940, he was the country's top amateur men's player, winning numerous titles at the city, provincial, regional, and national levels.

In August 1939, McDiarmid won his second Eastern Ontario Championships at the Rideau Lawn Tennis Club in Ottawa. McDiarmid defeated Montrealer Lewis Duff. He also won the men's doubles title paired with Ottawa's Eddie O’Hara.

In early July 1940, McDiarmid won both the singles and doubles titles at the Quebec open men's singles championship, in Montreal. In the singles final, he played Phil Pearson of Montreal, winning the singles title. McDiarmid and partner Lewis Duff won the men's doubles.

In late July 1940, McDiarmid won the Canadian National Championships (renamed the Canadian Open in 1968, today known as the Rogers Cup), played in Quebec City. The 24-year-old from Ottawa defeated Montrealer Lewis Duff in straight sets. McDiarmid teamed up with Duff in the men's doubles, losing in the final.

In June 1941, the Canadian Lawn Tennis Association named McDiarmid the number one men's player in Canada for 1940. The association also announced its unanimous decision to suspend Dominion (Canadian) championship tennis tournaments because of the Second World War. Given the suspension, McDiarmid held the men's singles title until 1946.

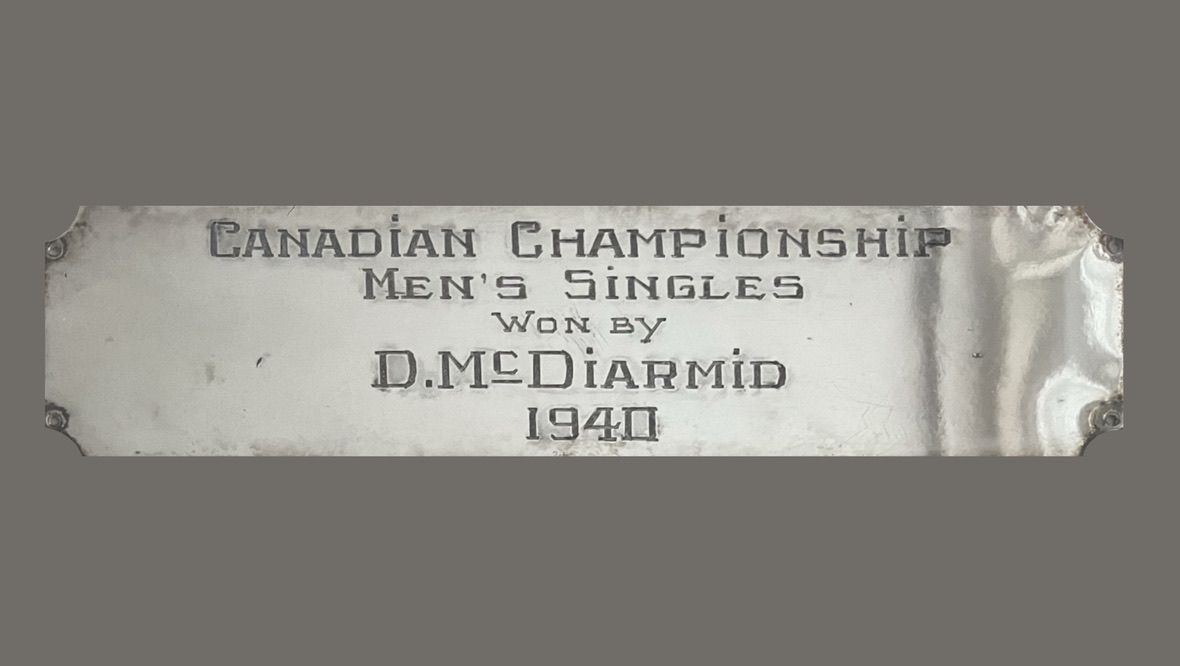
Plate from McDiarmid's 1940 Canadian Open trophy.

After winning the Canadian National Championships in 1940 (founded in 1881, the Canadian Open is the third oldest tennis championship after Wimbledon, 1877, and the U.S. Open, 1880), McDiarmid played his first U.S. National Championships (renamed the U.S. Open in 1968) tennis tournament at Forrest Hills, where he lost in the second round to New Yorker Charles Mattman.

== Second World War ==
In September 1941, with the Second World War underway, McDiarmid played Britain's eight-time Grand Slam tennis champion Fred Perry at an exhibition match at the Rideau Lawn Tennis Club. Hundreds of fans attended the wartime Red Cross fundraiser where McDiarmid played two matches against the reigning World's Professional Champion. In the afternoon, McDiarmid took the first set 6–4, and Perry took the second 6–3. In the evening, Perry bested McDiarmid 6–3, 6–3.

In 1938, the McDiarmid family established the popular annual McDiarmid brothers' doubles tournament that rotated through Ottawa-area clubs. Don, Gordon, Malcolm, and Clifford competed each year before family and friends. An article in the Ottawa Citizen in November 1942 reported that the unique family tournament was cancelled for the duration of the war, noting that Corporal McDiarmid had deployed to England with the Royal Canadian Air Force.

Having enlisted in the spring of 1942, McDiarmid deployed overseas in November as part of the RCAF's clerical establishment. He quickly became a sports ambassador for Canada and the Royal Canadian Air Force.

He was initially stationed in London, where he was welcomed as a guest player at the Queen's Club with full membership privileges. After London, he had short postings to Prestwick, Scotland, and the Inner Hebrides on Scotland's west coast. In 1943, he was posted to Algiers in North Africa, and then to Cairo, where he spent the balance of the war.

In Cairo, McDiarmid played tennis at the Wilcox Sports Club, winning several club titles. He also played a state tennis tournament, losing in the semi-finals to ace Egyptian player Andre Najar. During his leave period after the war in 1945, McDiarmid visited Athens, Naples, Glasgow, and spent a week in Edinburgh, playing tennis at clubs in each of those cities.

In late September 1945, McDiarmid was invited to play at a Canadian military services tournament in Hilversum, a small city in the Netherlands 24 kilometres southwest of Amsterdam (Canadian forces played a major role in liberating the Netherlands from Nazi occupation). Sergeant McDiarmid won his match in three straight sets, winning the singles trophy and helping the RCAF win the overall team trophy, beating the two army teams.

McDiarmid sailed back to Canada in October 1945 in the troopship Queen Elizabeth. Due to his confirmed sailing date, he had to turn down an invitation to play tennis at Wimbledon. (As Canadian open champion in 1940, he qualified to play at Wimbledon, which was suspended from 1940 to 1945 due to the war. He never played at Wimbledon).

== Post-War tennis career ==
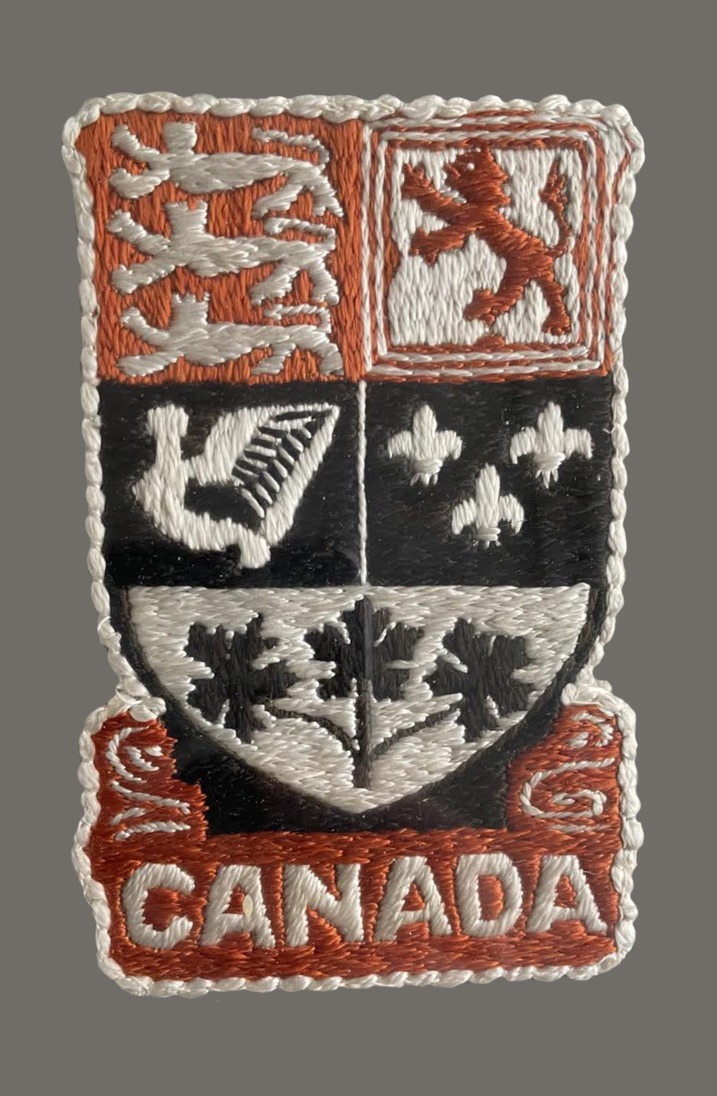
McDiarmid's Davis Cup blazer crest from 1946.

After the war, McDiarmid resumed his amateur tennis career. In May 1946, he was selected to play in the Davis Cup Americas Zone semi-finals against Mexico, in June. The match was hosted in Montreal. The Mexicans swept the Canadians. McDiarmid lost to Mexico's national singles champion, Armando Vega, in straight sets.

McDiarmid was the first Ottawa-born member of Canada's Davis Cup team.

In July 1946, McDiarmid defended his pre-war Canadian National Championships title and lost in the final to American Pride Morey Lewis in four close-fought sets. Hosted in Ottawa, it was a battle of two title holders as Lewis had won the Canadian open in 1939.

In September 1946, McDiarmid returned to the U.S. National Championships at Forrest Hills and again lost in the second round. In October 1946, McDiarmid was selected along with Jean Marois of Quebec City to play in a goodwill tournament on behalf of Canada in Mexico City. Both players found the heat and altitude very challenging at the Pan-American International Tennis Tournament. In singles play, McDiarmid lost to Peruvian Eduardo Bose.

In July 1947, McDiarmid travelled to Victoria and Vancouver, B.C., to compete for another spot on the Davis Cup team. He was ousted in a playoff by Brendan Macken. Macken went on to win the Canadian open in 1950.

== Retirement from tennis ==
Ranked Ontario's number one ranked player over the previous two years, McDiarmid announced his retirement from high-level tennis competition on 15 June 1949. He continued to give weekly tennis classes at the Rideau Lawn Tennis Club. In May 1951, he became the pro at the Rideau, offering group and individual instruction on Tuesday and Thursday evenings.

McDiarmid turned his attention to family and a career in Canada's federal public service at the Department of Finance. In August 1948, he married Connie (Constance G.) Morley; they had two children, Margo and Kim. He separated from Connie in 1970. In 1983 he married Janet Ann (née Buskard) Scanlon and gained three Scanlon stepchildren: James David, Lucy, and Leslie.

McDiarmid remained active in tennis throughout his life as a player, coach, and mentor. In his day, he was a well-known tennis star in Canada, especially in his hometown.

== Recognition and death ==
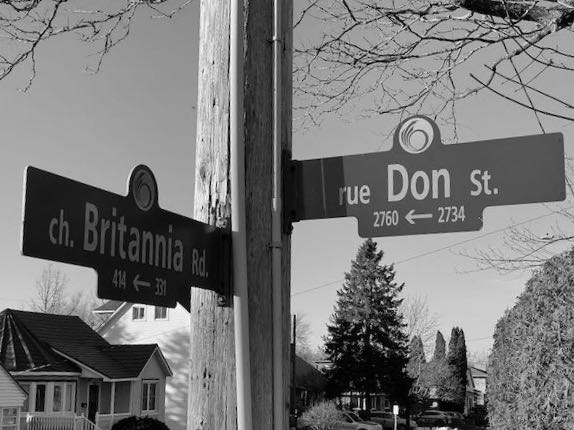
Don Street in Ottawa's Britannia area was renamed after McDiarmid to mark his Canadian Open victory.

He was recognized by the City of Ottawa (or its former municipalities) in several ways. In August 1940, he was awarded the Ottawa Civic Crest by Mayor Stanley Lewis the key to the city in the form of an embroidered civic crest. Cameron Street, in Ottawa's Britannia area, was renamed Don Street in McDiarmid's honour. McDiarmid was made an honorary life member at two of Ottawa's top tennis clubs, the Rideau Lawn Tennis Club, and the Ottawa Tennis and Lawn Bowling Club. Finally, in 1985 he was inducted into the Ottawa Sports Hall of Fame.

McDiarmid retired from the government in 1980. In 1981, he hosted former British tennis champion Fred Perry at the Ottawa Tennis and Lawn Bowling Club, where Perry held three one-hour clinics. The event helped mark the club's 100th anniversary.

McDiarmid died on 3 February 2002 with a tennis racket in hand while rallying indoors in Quebec with his second wife Janet, his partner of 25 years.
