= Toronto Lawn Tennis Club =

Private social and athletic club in Toronto, Canada

Coordinates: 43.68049°N 79.38877°W

The Toronto Lawn Tennis Club
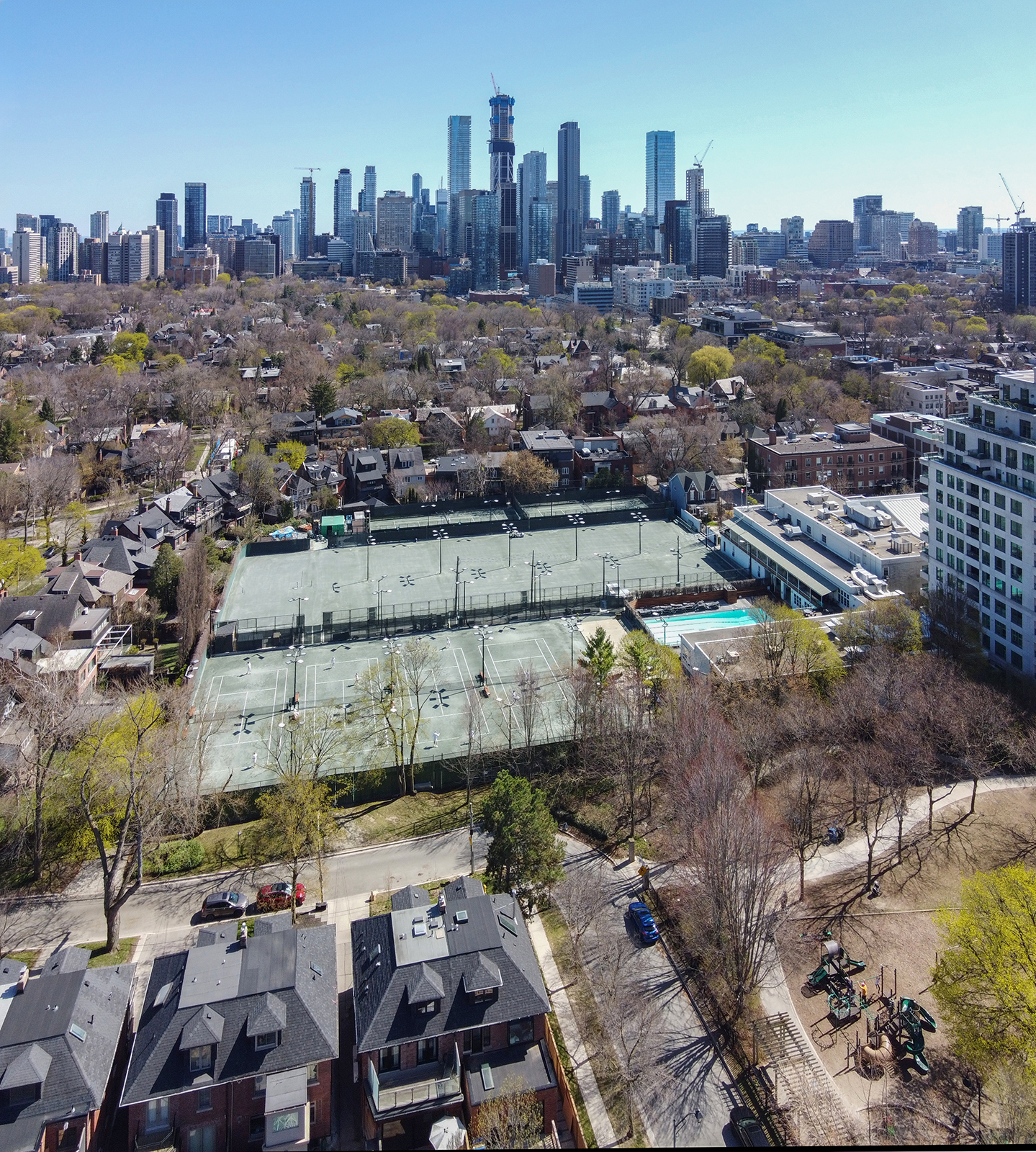
- View of the club's facilities in Rosedale
- Founded: 1876; 150 years ago
- Location(s): 44 Price Street Toronto, Ontario, Canada
- Services: Tennis, Swimming, Squash, Fitness, Dining, Kids Klub, Camps, Gym, Wellness
- Acting General Manager: Andrew Thompson
- Website: torontolawn.com

The Toronto Lawn Tennis Club is a private social and athletic club in Toronto, Ontario, Canada. It is the oldest active and surviving lawn tennis club in the world. Founded in 1876, the club has a long history of tennis competition. It is located at 44 Price Street in the affluent Rosedale neighbourhood, ranked as the most exclusive and desirable area to live in Toronto.

The club hosted the first ever National Tennis Championship of Canada and has hosted 2 Davis Cup ties.

The actual courts were established at 148 Front Street in Toronto in 1874 by I.F. Hellmuth, two years before the club was formed in 1876. The club played host to a tournament in 1881 (for gentlemen's singles) that over time became the Canadian Open tennis championship, now known as the National Bank Open. The location of the club moved to Rosedale in 1913. The surface for the courts was red clay.

The Toronto Lawn Tennis Club also played host to the first Davis Cup tie played in Canada, in July 1921. Australia swept aside Canada 5-0, with Canadian Henri Laframboise taking the only two sets dropped by the James Anderson-led Aussies. Six years later to the month, Jack Wright and Willard Crocker led Canada to a win against Cuba 3-2 in an American Zone semi-final contest. Both Davis Cup ties were competed on red clay.

The Toronto Lawn Tennis Club frequently hosted the Canadian Open Championships between 1881 and 1975, the initial 1881 event at the Club positioning the Canadian Open as the second oldest tennis tournament in the world next to Wimbledon and older than the U.S. Open by about one month. The 1971 Canadian Open was played at the Toronto Lawn Tennis Club on red clay and won by John Newcombe who defeated Ken Rosewall in the semifinal and Tom Okker in the superb final. The last Canadian Open championships played at the Club was in 1975 and won by Manuel Orantes. In 1976 the National Tennis Centre was opened in Toronto as a permanent host for the national title.

Other important tennis tournaments held at the Toronto Lawn Tennis Club included the O'Keefe International Championships amateur tournament held in the late 1950s and won in 1956 by Lew Hoad over Sven Davidson (who would win the event in 1957), and the 1959 O'Keefe Professional Championships won by Pancho Gonzales, which constituted part of Jack Kramer's Ampol tournament ranking series.

The Toronto Lawn Tennis Club expanded its facilities in 1960 to include squash.

== Sources ==
- Canada's Davis Cup record
- Toronto Lawn Tennis Club, 'About Us' guest page
- Squash Canada
