= National Tennis Centre (Canada) =

Sports facility in Toronto, which was demolished in 2003

Coordinates: 43.779144°N 79.500504°W

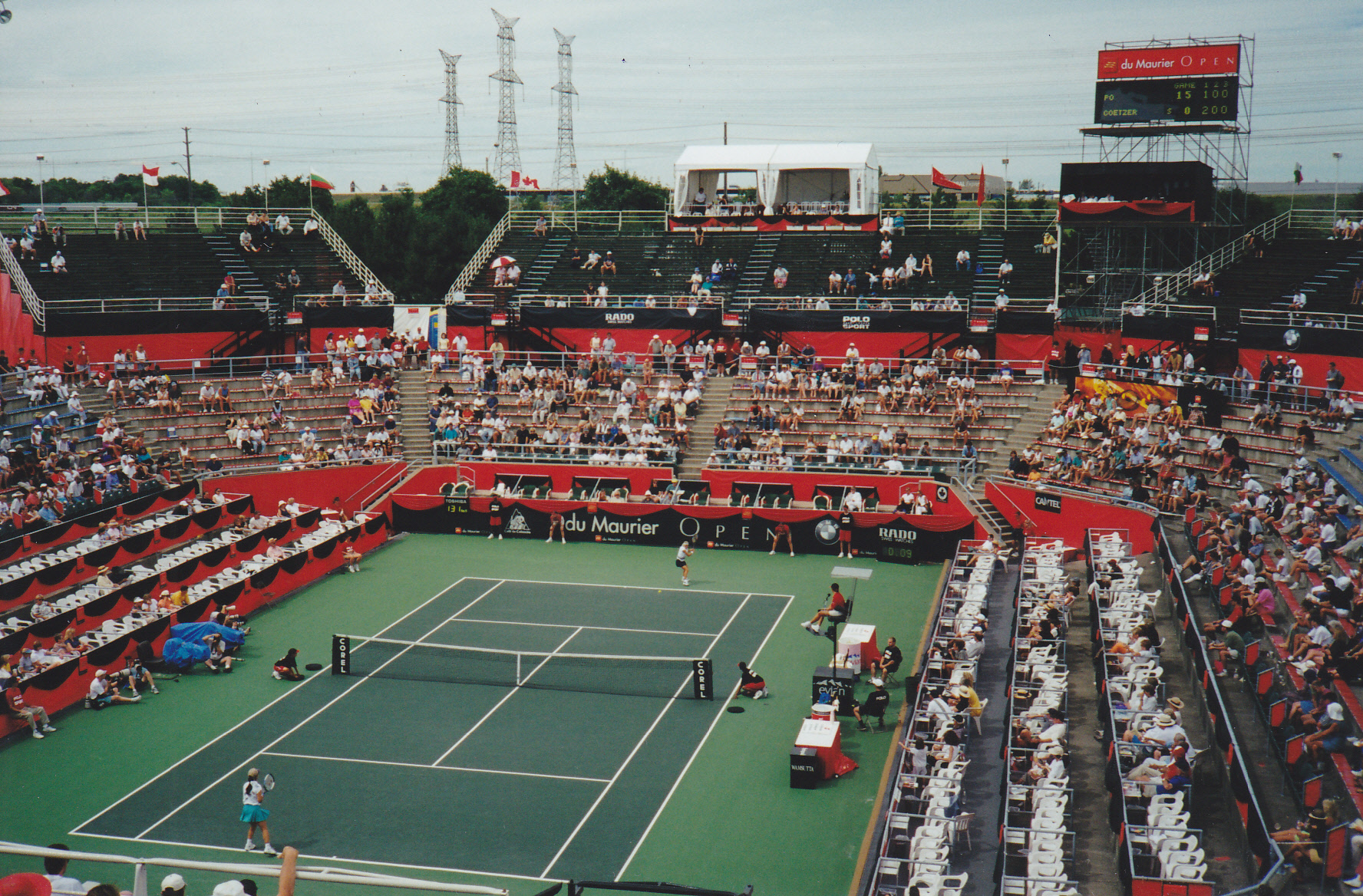
- National Tennis Centre in August 1997
- Interactive map of National Tennis Centre
- Address: 190 Albany Road
- Location: York University, Toronto, Ontario, Canada
- Owner: Tennis Canada
- Capacity: 10,000 (Stadium Court)
- Surface: Hard, Outdoors

Construction
- Built: 1975
- Opened: 1976
- Closed: 2003
- Demolished: 2003

Tenants
- Canada Masters (Men) (ATP 1000) (1976–2003); Rogers AT&T Cup (Women) (WTA Premier 5) (1976–2003)

The original National Tennis Centre in Toronto was located in the north end of York University's Keele Campus next to the Metro Toronto Track and Field Centre.

The first tournament at the facility was the 1976 Rothmans Canadian Open. Originally built with clay courts, it was changed to Har-Tru hardcourts in time for the 1979 tournament. The main structure was an open-air stadium that held roughly 10,000 fans, and a second show court held roughly 2,000. The site had six courts for play, and 4 practice courts (used for housing player facilities).

By the end of the 2000s, the wooden bench seating in the main stadium and the small grounds (boxed in by Steeles Avenue on the north, parking lots to the west and south and historic Jacob Stong House and Barn to the east) were deemed too small for the growing tournament and was not suitable for tier one tennis tours. Pressure from the ATP and the WTA Tours collectively forced the building of a new site on the west end of York University.

Its final event was the 2003 Rogers AT&T Cup women's tournament. The stadium was torn down and replaced by the new Rexall Centre (later Aviva Centre, now Sobeys Stadium) located to the west of this site the following year. The centre court has been demolished with area fenced off, but the eight outer courts are still present (two other courts are covered over). York University uses the building at 190 Albany Road for office space.

== See also ==
- List of tennis stadiums by capacity
