= 1981 Player's Canadian Open – Men's doubles =

Men's doubles
- 1981 Player's Canadian Open

Final
- Champions: (Mexico) Raúl Ramírez (United States) Ferdi Taygan
- Runners-up: (United States) Peter Fleming (United States) John McEnroe
- Score: 2–6, 7–6, 6–4

Details
- Draw: 32
- Seeds: 8

Events
Singles	men	women
Doubles	men	women
← 1980 ·	Canadian Open	· 1982 →

Bruce Manson and Brian Teacher were the defending champions, but lost in the semifinals to Raúl Ramírez and Ferdi Taygan.

Ramírez and Taygan won the title by defeating Peter Fleming and John McEnroe 2–6, 7–6, 6–4 in the final.

== Seeds ==
1. (United States) Peter Fleming / (United States) John McEnroe (final)
2. (United States) Bruce Manson / (United States) Brian Teacher (semifinals)
3. (Mexico) Raúl Ramírez / (United States) Ferdi Taygan (champions)
4. (Switzerland) Heinz Günthardt / (Czechoslovakia) Tomáš Šmíd (quarterfinals)
5. (Australia) Mark Edmondson / (United States) Sherwood Stewart (quarterfinals)
6. (United States) Vitas Gerulaitis / (Australia) Peter McNamara (quarterfinals)
7. (South Africa) Kevin Curren / (United States) Steve Denton (quarterfinals)
8. (United States) Tim Gullikson / (South Africa) Bernard Mitton (semifinals)

== Draw ==
=== Key ===
- Q = Qualifier
- WC = Wild card
- LL = Lucky loser
- Alt = Alternate
- SE = Special exempt
- PR = Protected ranking
- ITF = ITF entry
- JE = Junior exempt
- w/o = Walkover
- r = Retired
- d = Defaulted
- SR = Special ranking

=== Finals ===
Semifinals
1	(United States) Peter Fleming (United States) John McEnroe	5	6	6
8	(United States) Tim Gullikson (South Africa) Bernard Mitton	7	4	1
3	(Mexico) Raúl Ramírez (United States) Ferdi Taygan	6	6
2	(United States) Bruce Manson (United States) Brian Teacher	2	2

Final
1	(United States) Peter Fleming (United States) John McEnroe	6	6	4
3	(Mexico) Raúl Ramírez (United States) Ferdi Taygan	2	7	6

=== Top half ===
First round
1	(United States) P Fleming (United States) J McEnroe	7	7
(United States) G Holroyd (United States) S Meister	6	6
(India) A Amritraj (India) V Amritraj	6	6
(Switzerland) I Dupasquier (Switzerland) R Stadler	1	3
(Israel) S Glickstein (South Africa) D Schneider	6	6
(France) C Roger-Vasselin (France) T Tulasne	2	3
(United States) J Austin (United States) To Gullikson	6	3	4
6	(United States) V Gerulaitis (Australia) P McNamara	4	6	6
4	(Switzerland) H Günthardt (Czechoslovakia) T Šmíd	6	6
(Australia) P Dent (Australia) B Drewett	4	4
(Canada) R Bettauer (Canada) D Segal	6	6
(United States) B Cox (United States) Weller Evans	2	2
(United States) R Fagel (United States) J Gurfein	7	7
(United States) M Dickson (United States) R Meyers	6	6
(New Zealand) R Simpson (United States) T Waltke	4	5
8	(United States) Ti Gullikson (South Africa) B Mitton	6	7

Second round
1	(United States) P Fleming (United States) J McEnroe	7	6
(India) A Amritraj (India) V Amritraj	6	1
(Israel) S Glickstein (South Africa) D Schneider	4	1
6	(United States) V Gerulaitis (Australia) P McNamara	6	6
4	(Switzerland) H Günthardt (Czechoslovakia) T Šmíd	6	7
(Canada) R Bettauer (Canada) D Segal	3	6
(United States) R Fagel (United States) J Gurfein	2	3
8	(United States) Ti Gullikson (South Africa) B Mitton	6	6

Quarterfinals
1	(United States) P Fleming (United States) J McEnroe	6	7
6	(United States) V Gerulaitis (Australia) P McNamara	4	5
4	(Switzerland) H Günthardt (Czechoslovakia) T Šmíd	0	4
8	(United States) Ti Gullikson (South Africa) B Mitton	6	6

Semifinals
1	(United States) P Fleming (United States) J McEnroe	5	6	6
8	(United States) Ti Gullikson (South Africa) B Mitton	7	4	1

=== Bottom half ===
First round
5	(Australia) M Edmondson (United States) S Stewart	6	4	6
(Canada) J Brabenec (Canada) J Picken	3	6	3
(Australia) J Fitzgerald (New Zealand) C Lewis	w/o
(United Kingdom) J Lloyd (United States) N Saviano
(United States) S Giammalva Jr. (United States) T Giammalva	6	6
(United States) P DuPré (Austria) P Feigl	4	1
(Australia) S Docherty (United States) H Fritz	4	6
3	(Mexico) R Ramírez (United States) F Taygan	6	7
7	(South Africa) K Curren (United States) S Denton	7	6
(Sweden) J Norbäck (Sweden) H Simonsson	5	4
(Romania) I Năstase (United States) E Teltscher	7	6
(Canada) B Cowan (Canada) Nigel O'Rourke	6	4
(Canada) G Michibata (Canada) Steve Rogul	2	6	6
(United States) J Sadri (United States) T Wilkison	6	4	3
(Australia) D Carter (Sweden) P Hjertquist	4	5
2	(United States) B Manson (United States) B Teacher	6	7

Second round
5	(Australia) M Edmondson (United States) S Stewart	6	7
(Australia) J Fitzgerald (New Zealand) C Lewis	2	5
(United States) S Giammalva Jr. (United States) T Giammalva	3	6
3	(Mexico) R Ramírez (United States) F Taygan	6	7
7	(South Africa) K Curren (United States) S Denton	7	7
(Romania) I Năstase (United States) E Teltscher	6	6
(Canada) G Michibata (Canada) Steve Rogul	1	3
2	(United States) B Manson (United States) B Teacher	6	6

Quarterfinals
5	(Australia) M Edmondson (United States) S Stewart	5	6	4
3	(Mexico) R Ramírez (United States) F Taygan	7	4	6
7	(South Africa) K Curren (United States) S Denton	4	7	3
2	(United States) B Manson (United States) B Teacher	6	6	6

Semifinals
3	(Mexico) R Ramírez (United States) F Taygan	6	6
2	(United States) B Manson (United States) B Teacher	2	2
