= 1981 Player's Canadian Open – Men's singles =

Men's singles
- 1981 Player's Canadian Open

Final
- Champion: (Czechoslovakia) Ivan Lendl
- Runner-up: (United States) Eliot Teltscher
- Score: 6–3, 6–2

Details
- Draw: 64
- Seeds: 16

Events
Singles	men	women
Doubles	men	women
← 1980 ·	Player's Canadian Open	· 1982 →

Ivan Lendl was the defending champion.

Lendl successfully defended his title, defeating Eliot Teltscher in the final, 6–3, 6–2.

== Seeds ==
1. (United States) John McEnroe (third round)
2. (Sweden) ~~Björn Borg~~ (withdrew)
3. (United States) Jimmy Connors (first round)
4. (Czechoslovakia) Ivan Lendl (champion)
5. (Australia) Peter McNamara (third round)
6. (United States) Eliot Teltscher (final)
7. (United States) Brian Teacher (quarterfinals)
8. (United States) Vitas Gerulaitis (second round)
9. (United States) John Sadri (second round)
10. (India) Vijay Amritraj (semifinals)
11. (Czechoslovakia) Tomáš Šmíd (third round)
12. (United States) Sammy Giammalva Jr. (second round)
13. (United States) Tom Gullikson (third round)
14. N/A
15. (Israel) Shlomo Glickstein (semifinals)
16. (South Africa) Kevin Curren (second round)

== Draw ==
=== Key ===
- Q = Qualifier
- WC = Wild card
- LL = Lucky loser
- Alt = Alternate
- SE = Special exempt
- PR = Protected ranking
- ITF = ITF entry
- JE = Junior exempt
- w/o = Walkover
- r = Retired
- d = Defaulted
- SR = Special ranking

=== Finals ===
Semifinals
10	(India) Vijay Amritraj	6	2	3
6	(United States) Eliot Teltscher	1	6	6
4	(Czechoslovakia) Ivan Lendl	5	6	6
15	(Israel) Shlomo Glickstein	7	2	3

Final
6	(United States) Eliot Teltscher	3	2
4	(Czechoslovakia) Ivan Lendl	6	6

=== Top half ===
==== Section 1 ====
First round
1	(United States) J McEnroe	6	6
(Sweden) P Hjertquist	3	2
(United Kingdom) J Lloyd	1	3
(United States) P Fleming	6	6
(Sweden) H Simonsson	7	6
(Canada) B Cowan	6	4
(Australia) D Carter	0	4
10	(India) V Amritraj	6	6
12	(United States) S Giammalva Jr.	6	6
(United States) T Wilkison	3	4
(South Africa) B Mitton	6	4	6
(Chile) JC Ayala	4	6	1
(United States) R Van't Hof	2	2
(United States) S Denton	6	6
(United States) F Taygan	3	2
8	(United States) V Gerulaitis	6	6

Second round
1	(United States) J McEnroe	6	6
(United States) P Fleming	3	2
(Sweden) H Simonsson	1	6	2
10	(India) V Amritraj	6	4	6
12	(United States) S Giammalva Jr.	6	3
(South Africa) B Mitton	7	6
(United States) S Denton	1	7	6
8	(United States) V Gerulaitis	6	6	4

Third round
1	(United States) J McEnroe	7	6	1
10	(India) V Amritraj	5	7	6
(South Africa) B Mitton	6	5	6
(United States) S Denton	4	7	7

Quarterfinals
10	(India) V Amritraj	6	6
(United States) S Denton	2	2

==== Section 2 ====
First round
3	(United States) J Connors	4	3
(United States) T Waltke	6	6
(Switzerland) R Stadler	1	6	2
(France) C Roger-Vasselin	6	4	6
(Switzerland) H Günthardt	6	6
Q	(Canada) N O'Rourke	0	1
WC	(Canada) G Michibata	4	2
16	(South Africa) K Curren	6	6
11	(Czechoslovakia) T Šmíd	6	7
Q	(United States) M Dickson	2	6
(Sweden) J Norbäck	5	0
(United States) B Manson	7	6
(France) B Fritz	6	6
WC	(Canada) S Bonneau	4	1
Q	(United States) R Meyers	4	0
6	(United States) E Teltscher	6	6

Second round
(United States) T Waltke	2	7	3
(France) C Roger-Vasselin	6	6	6
(Switzerland) H Günthardt	3	6	6
16	(South Africa) K Curren	6	3	2
11	(Czechoslovakia) T Šmíd	7	3	7
(United States) B Manson	6	6	6
(France) B Fritz	3	1
6	(United States) E Teltscher	6	6

Third round
(France) C Roger-Vasselin	3	2
(Switzerland) H Günthardt	6	6
11	(Czechoslovakia) T Šmíd	3	4
6	(United States) E Teltscher	6	6

Quarterfinals
(Switzerland) H Günthardt	4	2
6	(United States) E Teltscher	6	6

==== Section 3 ====
First round
7	(United States) B Teacher	5	6	6
(United States) J Austin	7	2	4
(United States) J Gurfein	3	6	6
(United States) P Du Pré	6	2	4
(Australia) B Drewett	7	7
Q	(Canada) J Brabenec	5	6
(United States) S Meister	6	6
LL	(United States) D Schneider	4	4
9	(United States) J Sadri	6	6
(Australia) M Edmondson	1	4
(India) A Amritraj	6	6
Q	(United States) G Holroyd	3	4
(United States) Ti Gullikson	6	6
(France) T Tulasne	3	1
(New Zealand) C Lewis	2	6	1
4	(Czechoslovakia) I Lendl	6	3	6

Second round
7	(United States) B Teacher	6	7
(United States) J Gurfein	3	6
(Australia) B Drewett	2	6	6
(United States) S Meister	6	1	1
9	(United States) J Sadri	4	6	5
(India) A Amritraj	6	4	7
(United States) Ti Gullikson	1	2
4	(Czechoslovakia) I Lendl	6	6

Third round
7	(United States) B Teacher	3	6	6
(Australia) B Drewett	6	3	3
(India) A Amritraj	0	3
4	(Czechoslovakia) I Lendl	6	6

Quarterfinals
7	(United States) B Teacher	1	1
4	(Czechoslovakia) I Lendl	6	6

==== Section 4 ====
First round
5	(Australia) P McNamara	6	6
(United States) T Giammalva	3	3
(Australia) J Fitzgerald	6	6
Q	(United States) A Kohlberg	0	2
(Australia) P Dent	2	6	6
(New Zealand) R Simpson	6	4	7
(Australia) S Docherty	7	3	3
15	(Israel) S Glickstein	6	6	6
13	(United States) To Gullikson	6	6
(France) D Bedel	3	0
(United States) R Fagel	6	2
(Austria) P Feigl	7	6
(United States) N Saviano	6	3	2
(India) R Krishnan	2	6	6
(United States) S Stewart	6	5	7
LL	(United States) T Lundy	4	7	5

Second round
5	(Australia) P McNamara	6	6
(Australia) J Fitzgerald	2	4
(New Zealand) R Simpson	3	3
15	(Israel) S Glickstein	6	6
13	(United States) To Gullikson	5	6	6
(Austria) P Feigl	7	1	4
(India) R Krishnan	7	6
(United States) S Stewart	5	1

Third round
5	(Australia) P McNamara	4	6	3
15	(Israel) S Glickstein	6	3	6
13	(United States) To Gullikson	1	3
(India) R Krishnan	6	6

Quarterfinals
15	(Israel) S Glickstein	3	6	6
(India) R Krishnan	6	3	4
