= 1985 Molson Light Challenge – Singles =

Singles
- 1985 Toronto Indoor

Final
- Champion: (South Africa) Kevin Curren
- Runner-up: (Sweden) Anders Järryd
- Score: 7–6, 6–3

Details
- Draw: 32
- Seeds: 8

Events
Singles	Doubles
← 1984 ·	Toronto Indoor	· 1986 →

The 1985 Toronto Indoor (also known as the Molson Light Challenge for sponsorship reasons) was a tennis tournament played on indoor carpet courts in Toronto, Ontario, Canada that was part of the 1985 Nabisco Grand Prix. Kevin Curren won in the final 7–6, 6–3 against Anders Järryd.

== Seeds ==
1. (Sweden) Anders Järryd (final)
2. (United States) Eliot Teltscher (semifinals)
3. (South Africa) Kevin Curren (champion)
4. (United States) Jimmy Arias (first round)
5. (United States) Gene Mayer (quarterfinals)
6. (India) Ramesh Krishnan (quarterfinals)
7. (United States) John Sadri (first round)
8. (United States) Bob Green (first round)

== Draw ==
=== Key ===
- Q = Qualifier
- WC = Wild card
- LL = Lucky loser
- Alt = Alternate
- SE = Special exempt
- PR = Protected ranking
- ITF = ITF entry
- JE = Junior exempt
- w/o = Walkover
- r = Retired
- d = Defaulted
- SR = Special ranking

=== Finals ===
Semifinals
1	(Sweden) Anders Järryd	4	6	6
(Poland) Wojtek Fibak	6	4	3
3	(South Africa) Kevin Curren	6	6
2	(United States) Eliot Teltscher	3	3

Final
1	(Sweden) Anders Järryd	6	3
3	(South Africa) Kevin Curren	7	6

=== Top half ===
Round One
1	(Sweden) A Järryd	5	7	6
(United States) S Giammalava	7	6	2
(United States) S Meister	3	6	4
Q	(United States) M De Palmer	6	0	6
(United States) P Fleming	6	7
(United States) L Shiras	3	6
(Sweden) T Högstedt	5	6	6
8	(United States) B Green	7	2	3
4	(United States) J Arias	1	7	5
(Paraguay) F González	6	6	7
(Poland) W Fibak	7	7
(United States) T Mayotte	5	6
(Netherlands) M Schapers	7	6
(Switzerland) J Hlasek	5	4
(Czechoslovakia) J Navrátil	2	1
5	(United States) G Mayer	6	6

Round Two
1	(Sweden) A Järryd	4	6	6
(United States) M De Palmer	6	1	4
(United States) P Fleming	7	6
(Sweden) T Högstedt	6	3
(Paraguay) F González	1	6	4
(Poland) W Fibak	6	4	6
(Netherlands) M Schapers	4	7	4
5	(United States) G Mayer	6	5	6

Quarter Finals
1	(Sweden) A Järryd	6	2	6
(United States) P Fleming	3	6	2
(Poland) W Fibak	6	1	6
5	(United States) G Mayer	1	6	4

Semi Final
1	(Sweden) A Järryd	4	6	6
(Poland) W Fibak	6	4	3

=== Bottom half ===
Round One
7	(United States) J Sadri	6	7	6
(Canada) M Wostenholme	7	6	1
Q	(United States) B Schultz	7	7
(United States) G Layendecker	6	6
(United States) B Scanlon	6	7	3
(United States) P Annacone	7	6	6
(United States) B Drewett	2	4
3	(South Africa) K Curren	6	6
6	(India) R Krishnan	4	6	7
Q	(Jamaica) D Burke	6	2	5
(Canada) S Bonneau	6	6
(United States) M Leach	7	7
(United States) C Hooper	6	6
(Hungary) Z Kuhárszky	2	4
(Canada) G Michibata	6	4
2	(United States) E Teltscher	6	7

Round Two
7	(United States) J Sadri	7	2	4
Q	(United States) B Schultz	6	6	6
(United States) P Annacone	7	6
3	(South Africa) K Curren	6	3
6	(India) R Krishnan	3	6	6
(United States) M Leach	6	2	4
(United States) C Hooper	6	6	2
2	(United States) E Teltscher	7	3	6

Quarter Final
Q	(United States) B Schultz	2	0
3	(South Africa) K Curren	6	6
6	(India) R Krishnan	2	4
2	(United States) E Teltscher	6	6

Semi Final
3	(South Africa) K Curren	6	6
2	(United States) E Teltscher	3	3
