= 1990 SkyDome World Tennis Tournament =

- Date: February 12–18
- Edition: 3rd
- Category: Championship Series
- Draw: 56S / 28D
- Prize money: $1,005,000
- Surface: Carpet / indoor
- Location: Toronto, Ontario, Canada
- Venue: SkyDome

Champions

Singles
- (Czechoslovakia) Ivan Lendl

Doubles
- (United States) Patrick Galbraith / (Australia) David Macpherson
← 1986 ·	SkyDome World Tennis Tournament

The 1990 SkyDome World Tennis Tournament was a men's tennis tournament played on indoor carpet courts. It was the 3rd edition of the event known that year as the SkyDome World Tennis Tournament (previously held twice in 1985 and 1986), and was part of the ATP Championship Series, double-week events of the 1990 ATP Tour, running concurrently with the 1990 Belgian Indoor Championships. It took place at the SkyDome in Toronto, Ontario, Canada, from February 12 to February 18, 1990. First-seeded Ivan Lendl won the singles title.

== Finals ==
=== Singles ===
(Czechoslovakia) Ivan Lendl defeated (United States) Tim Mayotte, 6–3, 6–0

- It was Lendl's third singles title of the year, and the 86th of his career.

=== Doubles ===
(United States) Patrick Galbraith / (Australia) David Macpherson defeated (South Africa) Neil Broad / (United States) Kevin Curren, 2–6, 6–4, 6–3

- It was Galbraith's first doubles title of the year, and the second of his career.
- It was Macpherson's first doubles title of the year, and of his career.
