= 1985 Molson Light Challenge =

- Date: February 18–24
- Edition: 1st
- Category: Grand Prix
- Draw: 32S / 16D
- Prize money: $125,000
- Surface: Carpet / indoor
- Location: Toronto, Ontario, Canada
- Venue: Varsity Arena

Champions

Singles
- (South Africa) Kevin Curren

Doubles
- (United States) Peter Fleming / (Sweden) Anders Järryd
- Toronto Indoor

The 1985 Molson Light Challenge, also known as the Toronto Indoor, was a men's tennis tournament played on indoor carpet courts at the Varsity Arena in Toronto, Ontario, Canada, that was part of the 1985 Nabisco Grand Prix. It was the inaugural edition of the tournament and was held from February 18 through February 24, 1985. Third-seeded Kevin Curren won the singles title and earned $25,000 first-prize money.

== Finals ==
=== Singles ===
(South Africa) Kevin Curren defeated (Sweden) Anders Järryd, 7–6^{(8–6)}, 6–3

- It was Curren's only singles title of the year and the 3rd of his career.

=== Doubles ===
(United States) Peter Fleming / (Sweden) Anders Järryd defeated (United States) Glenn Layendecker / (Canada) Glenn Michibata, 7–6^{(8–6)}, 6–2

== Prize money ==
Event	W	F	SF	QF	Round of 16	Round of 32
Singles	$25,000	$12,500	$6,625	$3,562	$1,937	$1,062
Doubles*	$7,500	$3,750	$2,075	$1,300	$862	—N/a

_{*per team}
