= 1983 Player's Canadian Open – Men's singles =

Men's singles
- 1983 Player's Canadian Open

Final
- Champion: (Czechoslovakia) Ivan Lendl
- Runner-up: (Sweden) Anders Järryd
- Score: 6–2, 6–2

Details
- Draw: 56
- Seeds: 16

Events
Singles	men	women
Doubles	men	women
← 1982 ·	Player's Canadian Open	· 1984 →

Vitas Gerulaitis was the defending champion, but lost in the third round this year.

Ivan Lendl successfully defended his title, defeating Anders Järryd 6–2, 6–2 in the final.

== Seeds ==
1. (United States) John McEnroe (semifinals)
2. (Czechoslovakia) Ivan Lendl (champion)
3. (United States) Jimmy Connors (semifinals)
4. (France) Yannick Noah (third round)
5. (Sweden) Mats Wilander (second round)
6. (South Africa) Kevin Curren (quarterfinals)
7. (United States) Vitas Gerulaitis (third round)
8. (United States) Johan Kriek (quarterfinals)
9. (United States) Eliot Teltscher (second round)
10. (United States) Sandy Mayer (third round)
11. (Czechoslovakia) Tomáš Šmíd (second round)
12. (France) Henri Leconte (first round)
13. (United States) Hank Pfister (first round)
14. (Poland) Wojtek Fibak (second round)
15. (United States) Robert Van't Hof (second round)
16. (United States) Brian Teacher (quarterfinals)

== Draw ==
=== Key ===
- Q = Qualifier
- WC = Wild card
- LL = Lucky loser
- Alt = Alternate
- SE = Special exempt
- PR = Protected ranking
- ITF = ITF entry
- JE = Junior exempt
- w/o = Walkover
- r = Retired
- d = Defaulted
- SR = Special ranking

=== Finals ===
Semifinals
1	(United States) John McEnroe	3	6
Q	(Sweden) Anders Järryd	6	7
3	(United States) Jimmy Connors	1	3
2	(Czechoslovakia) Ivan Lendl	6	6

Final
Q	(Sweden) Anders Järryd	2	2
2	(Czechoslovakia) Ivan Lendl	6	6

=== Top half ===
==== Section 1 ====
First round
(Canada) G Michibata	1	1
(Brazil) M Hocevar	6	6
(United States) M Bauer	3	7	3
(United States) T Mayotte	6	5	6
(France) C Roger-Vasselin	1	7	1
14	(Poland) W Fibak	6	6	6
16	(United States) B Teacher	7	6
(Canada) D Segal	5	1
(United States) F Buehning	6	6
(Australia) M Edmondson	0	3
(United States) T Wilkison	3	4
(Italy) G Ocleppo	6	6

Second round
1	(United States) J McEnroe	6	4	6
(Brazil) M Hocevar	2	6	1
(United States) T Mayotte	6	6
14	(Poland) W Fibak	4	3
16	(United States) B Teacher	6	7
(United States) F Buehning	2	6
(Italy) G Ocleppo	6	6
5	(Sweden) M Wilander	4	3

Third round
1	(United States) J McEnroe	6	5	6
(United States) T Mayotte	3	7	2
16	(United States) B Teacher	6	6
(Italy) G Ocleppo	3	1

Quarterfinals
1	(United States) J McEnroe	7	6
16	(United States) B Teacher	6	2

==== Section 2 ====
First round
(France) G Forget	6	6
Q	(United States) T Nelson	4	3
(United States) P Fleming	6	6
(United States) V Van Patten	4	2
(Sweden) H Simonsson	3	2
11	(Czechoslovakia) T Šmíd	6	6
9	(United States) E Teltscher	7	6
Q	(United States) L Stefanki	5	2
Q	(Sweden) A Järryd	6	6
(United States) T Gullikson	2	3
(Nigeria) N Odizor	2	3
(New Zealand) R Simpson	6	6

Second round
4	(France) Y Noah	6	6
(France) G Forget	0	2
(United States) P Fleming	6	6
11	(Czechoslovakia) T Šmíd	4	1
9	(United States) E Teltscher	6	2
Q	(Sweden) A Järryd	7	6
(New Zealand) R Simpson	1	2
7	(United States) V Gerulaitis	6	6

Third round
4	(France) Y Noah	5	6	1
(United States) P Fleming	7	2	6
Q	(Sweden) A Järryd	6	5	6
7	(United States) V Gerulaitis	3	7	4

Quarterfinals
(United States) P Fleming	2	3
Q	(Sweden) A Järryd	6	6

==== Section 3 ====
First round
Q	(Australia) B Dyke	7	4	3
(Brazil) C Motta	5	6	6
Q	(France) G Goven	6	6
(Canada) M Wostenholme	4	1
(India) R Krishnan	4	6	6
12	(France) H Leconte	6	2	2
13	(United States) H Pfister	4	0
(United States) S Giammalva Jr.	6	6
(Brazil) C Kirmayr	4	6
(United States) C Hooper	6	7
(Sweden) J Nyström	6	6
(Sweden) S Simonsson	3	2

Second round
6	(South Africa) K Curren	6	6
(Brazil) C Motta	3	2
Q	(France) G Goven	6	6
(India) R Krishnan	4	1
(United States) S Giammalva Jr.	6	7
(United States) C Hooper	4	5
(Sweden) J Nyström	0	2
3	(United States) J Connors	6	6

Third round
6	(South Africa) K Curren	6	6
Q	(France) G Goven	2	3
(United States) S Giammalva Jr.	0	4
3	(United States) J Connors	6	6

Quarterfinals
6	(South Africa) K Curren	3	5
3	(United States) J Connors	6	7

==== Section 4 ====
First round
(Australia) P Cash	2	2
(Australia) P McNamee	6	6
(United States) R Harmon	6	6
(Australia) J McCurdy	4	4
(United States) S Davis	1	4
15	(United States) R Van't Hof	6	6
10	(United States) S Mayer	6	6
(Canada) J Picken	1	2
(Israel) S Glickstein	6	6
(United States) B Gilbert	4	2
Q	(Canada) D Power	2	6
(Canada) S Bonneau	6	7

Second round
8	(United States) J Kriek	7	7
(Australia) P McNamee	6	6
(United States) R Harmon	6	6
15	(United States) R Van't Hof	3	3
10	(United States) S Mayer	6	6	6
(Israel) S Glickstein	7	1	3
(Canada) S Bonneau	2	1
2	(Czechoslovakia) I Lendl	6	6

Third round
8	(United States) J Kriek	6	6
(United States) R Harmon	1	2
10	(United States) S Mayer	0	7	1
2	(Czechoslovakia) I Lendl	6	6	6

Quarterfinals
8	(United States) J Kriek	2	1
2	(Czechoslovakia) I Lendl	6	6
