= 1986 Toronto Indoor – Doubles =

Doubles
- 1986 Toronto Indoor

Final
- Champions: (Poland) Wojtek Fibak (Sweden) Joakim Nyström
- Runners-up: (South Africa) Christo Steyn (South Africa) Danie Visser
- Score: 6–3, 7–6

Details
- Draw: 16
- Seeds: 4

Events
Singles	Doubles
- Toronto Indoor

Peter Fleming and Anders Järryd were the defending champions, but Järryd did not participate this year. Fleming partnered Anand Amritraj, losing in the first round.

Wojtek Fibak and Joakim Nyström won in the final 6–3, 7–6, against Christo Steyn and Danie Visser.

== Seeds ==
1. (Poland) Wojtek Fibak / (Sweden) Joakim Nyström (champions)
2. (India) Anand Amritraj / (United States) Peter Fleming (first round)
3. (Israel) Amos Mansdorf / (Israel) Shahar Perkiss (first round)
4. (United States) Mark Dickson / (United States) Chris Dunk (semifinals)

== Draw ==
Key

- Q = Qualifier
- WC = Wild card
- LL = Lucky loser
- Alt = Alternate
- ITF = ITF entry
- PR = Protected ranking
- SR = Special ranking
- SE = Special exempt
- JE = Junior exempt
- JR = Junior Accelerator Programme entrant
- CO = College Accelerator Programme entrant
- NG = Next Gen Accelerator Program entrant
- w/o = Walkover
- r = Retired
- d = Defaulted

=== Draw ===
First round
1	(Poland) W Fibak (Sweden) J Nyström	1	6	7
(Canada) H McDadi (United States) B Nealon	6	4	6
(United States) B Green (Romania) F Segărceanu	1	4
(United States) G Layendecker (Canada) G Michibata	6	6
4	(United States) M Dickson (United States) C Dunk	6	4	6
(West Germany) R Osterthun (Sweden) J Svensson	4	6	3
(Canada) A Sznajder (Canada) M Wostenholme	6	2	1
(Australia) B Dyke (Argentina) R Saad	3	6	6
(United Kingdom) J Bates (United States) L Shiras	7	6
(Brazil) C Kirmayr (Mexico) F Maciel	6	2
(United States) J Arons (United States) M Flur	5	6	6
3	(Israel) A Mansdorf (Israel) S Perkiss	7	4	3
(Sweden) S Eriksson (New Zealand) R Simpson	7	3	6
(South Africa) E Edwards (Paraguay) F González	6	6	3
(South Africa) C Steyn (South Africa) D Visser	6	4	7
2	(India) A Amritraj (United States) P Fleming	4	6	5

Quarterfinals
1	(Poland) W Fibak (Sweden) J Nyström	6	7	7
(United States) G Layendecker (Canada) G Michibata	7	5	5
4	(United States) M Dickson (United States) C Dunk	6	6
(Australia) B Dyke (Argentina) R Saad	4	4
(United Kingdom) J Bates (United States) L Shiras	4	6	7
(United States) J Arons (United States) M Flur	6	3	6
(Sweden) S Eriksson (New Zealand) R Simpson	4	6
(South Africa) C Steyn (South Africa) D Visser	6	7

Semifinals
1	(Poland) W Fibak (Sweden) J Nyström	6	3	7
4	(United States) M Dickson (United States) C Dunk	4	6	6
(United Kingdom) J Bates (United States) L Shiras	6	3
(South Africa) C Steyn (South Africa) D Visser	7	6

Final
1	(Poland) W Fibak (Sweden) J Nyström	6	7
(South Africa) C Steyn (South Africa) D Visser	3	6
