= 1990 SkyDome World Tennis Tournament – Doubles =

Doubles
- 1990 SkyDome World Tennis Tournament

Final
- Champions: (United States) Patrick Galbraith (Australia) David Macpherson
- Runners-up: (South Africa) Neil Broad (United States) Kevin Curren
- Score: 2–6, 6–4, 6–3

Details
- Draw: 28
- Seeds: 8

Events
| Singles | Doubles |
- SkyDome World Tennis Tournament

Wojciech Fibak and Joakim Nyström were the champions of the event when it last took place, in 1986. Neither of them participated in 1990.
Patrick Galbraith and David Macpherson won the title, defeating Neil Broad and Kevin Curren 2–6, 6–4, 6–3, in the final.

== Seeds ==
The top four seeds receive a bye into the second round.

1. (United States) Rick Leach / (United States) Jim Pugh (quarterfinals)
2. (United States) Jim Grabb / (United States) Patrick McEnroe (withdrew)
3. (United States) Ken Flach / (United States) Robert Seguso (second round)
4. (United States) Scott Davis / (United States) David Pate (quarterfinals)
5. (Australia) Darren Cahill / (Australia) Mark Kratzmann (first round)
6. (South Africa) Neil Broad / (United States) Kevin Curren (final)
7. (Canada) Grant Connell / (Canada) Glenn Michibata (second round)
8. (United States) Jim Courier / (United States) Pete Sampras (withdrew)

== Draw ==
Key

- Q = Qualifier
- WC = Wild card
- LL = Lucky loser
- Alt = Alternate
- ITF = ITF entry
- PR = Protected ranking
- SR = Special ranking
- SE = Special exempt
- JE = Junior exempt
- JR = Junior Accelerator Programme entrant
- CO = College Accelerator Programme entrant
- NG = Next Gen Accelerator Program entrant
- w/o = Walkover
- r = Retired
- d = Defaulted

=== Finals ===
Semifinals
(Mexico) Jorge Lozano (United States) Todd Witsken | 4 | 5
6 | (South Africa) Neil Broad (United States) Kevin Curren | 6 | 7
(United States) Patrick Galbraith (Australia) David Macpherson | 6 | 6
LL | (Sweden) Niclas Kroon (Sweden) Peter Lundgren | 3 | 3

Final
6 | (South Africa) Neil Broad (United States) Kevin Curren | 6 | 4 | 3
(United States) Patrick Galbraith (Australia) David Macpherson | 2 | 6 | 6

=== Top half ===
First round
(United States) P Chamberlin (United States) T Wilkison | 7 | 6
(Ecuador) A Gómez (Peru) J Yzaga | 5 | 3
Q | (United States) D Cassidy (United States) L Shiras | 4 | 4
(Mexico) J Lozano (United States) T Witsken | 6 | 6
(Netherlands) P Haarhuis (Sweden) F Nilsson | 3 | 2
LL | (United States) J Berger (United States) D Rostagno | 6 | 6
(United States) G Layendecker (United States) R Reneberg | 6 | 6^{2} | 6
(Canada) S Lareau (Canada) S Leblanc | 3 | 7^{7} | 3
(United States) S Cannon (United States) G Van Emburgh | 3 | 4
(Austria) A Antonitsch (Netherlands) T Nijssen | 6 | 6
(Canada) R Janecek (Canada) A Sznajder | 4 | 4
6 | (South Africa) N Broad (United States) K Curren | 6 | 6

Second round
1 | (United States) R Leach (United States) J Pugh | 6 | 6
(United States) P Chamberlin (United States) T Wilkison | 1 | 3
(Mexico) J Lozano (United States) T Witsken | 6 | 6
LL | (United States) J Berger (United States) D Rostagno | 3 | 3
4 | (United States) S Davis (United States) D Pate | 6 | 6
(United States) G Layendecker (United States) R Reneberg | 3 | 4
(Austria) A Antonitsch (Netherlands) T Nijssen | 4 | 4
6 | (South Africa) N Broad (United States) K Curren | 6 | 6

Quarterfinals
1 | (United States) R Leach (United States) J Pugh | 4 | 6 | 2
(Mexico) J Lozano (United States) T Witsken | 6 | 1 | 6
4 | (United States) S Davis (United States) D Pate | 4 | 4
6 | (South Africa) N Broad (United States) K Curren | 6 | 6

Semifinals
(Mexico) J Lozano (United States) T Witsken | 4 | 5
6 | (South Africa) N Broad (United States) K Curren | 6 | 7

=== Bottom half ===
First round
5 | (Australia) D Cahill (Australia) M Kratzmann | 3 | 4
(United States) P Galbraith (Australia) D Macpherson | 6 | 6
(Czechoslovakia) P Korda (Czechoslovakia) M Šrejber | 6 | 6
(France) J-P Fleurian (Canada) M Laurendeau | 1 | 2
(Australia) J Fitzgerald (Australia) W Masur | 3 | 7 | 4
(United States) K Jones (United States) R Van't Hof | 6 | 5 | 6
7 | (Canada) G Connell (Canada) G Michibata | 6 | 6
(United States) S Devries (United States) R Matuszewski | 1 | 2
Q | (United States) B Garnett (United States) J Sobel | 6^{2} | 6 | 6
(Canada) C Pridham (Canada) M Wostenholme | 7^{7} | 3 | 4
(United States) M Davis (New Zealand) K Evernden | 6^{3} | 5
LL | (United States) B Page (United States) R Schmidt | 7^{7} | 7

Second round
(United States) P Galbraith (Australia) D Macpherson | 6^{3} | 7^{7} | 7
(Czechoslovakia) P Korda (Czechoslovakia) M Šrejber | 7^{7} | 6^{4} | 5
(United States) K Jones (United States) R Van't Hof | 6 | 6
3 | (United States) K Flach (United States) R Seguso | 4 | 4
7 | (Canada) G Connell (Canada) G Michibata | 6^{5} | 3
Q | (United States) B Garnett (United States) J Sobel | 7^{7} | 6
LL | (United States) B Page (United States) R Schmidt | 6^{5} | 3
LL | (Sweden) N Kroon (Sweden) P Lundgren | 7^{7} | 6

Quarterfinals
(United States) P Galbraith (Australia) D Macpherson | 3 | 6 | 6
(United States) K Jones (United States) R Van't Hof | 6 | 3 | 4
Q | (United States) B Garnett (United States) J Sobel | 6^{6} | 4
LL | (Sweden) N Kroon (Sweden) P Lundgren | 7^{8} | 6

Semifinals
(United States) P Galbraith (Australia) D Macpherson | 6 | 6
LL | (Sweden) N Kroon (Sweden) P Lundgren | 3 | 3
