= 1983 Toronto Molson Light Challenge =

- 1983 Toronto Molson Light Challenge

Final
- Champion: (United States) Jimmy Connors
- Runner-up: (Spain) José Higueras
- Score: 6–2, 6–0, 5–7, 6–0
| ← 1982 · | Toronto Molson Light Challenge | · 1984 → |

In the final game, Jimmy Connors secured victory with a commanding 6–2, 6–0, 5–7, 6–0 triumph over José Higueras.

== Players ==
1. (United States) Jimmy Connors (champion)
2. (Spain) José Higueras (final)
3. (United States) Gene Mayer (semifinals)
4. (Australia) Peter McNamara (semifinals)
5. (United States) Tim Mayotte (round-robin)
6. (Sweden) Mats Wilander (round-robin)
7. (United States) Vitas Gerulaitis (round-robin)
8. (United States) Brian Gottfried (round-robin)
9. (Sweden) Björn Borg (withdrew due to finger injury, replaced by José Higueras)
10. (Czechoslovakia) Ivan Lendl (withdrew due to shoulder injury, replaced by Gene Mayer)

== Draw ==
=== Finals ===
Semi-finals
(United States) Jimmy Connors | 6 | 6 | 7
(Australia) Peter McNamara | 4 | 4 | 5
(United States) Gene Mayer | 6 | 4 | 6
(Spain) José Higueras | 7 | 6 | 7

Final
(United States) Jimmy Connors | 6 | 6 | 5 | 6
(Spain) José Higueras | 2 | 0 | 7 | 0

=== Group A ===
| | (United States) Jimmy Connors | (Spain) José Higueras | (United States) Tim Mayotte | (United States) Vitas Gerulaitis | RR W–L | Set W–L | Game W–L | Standings |
| (United States) Jimmy Connors | | 6-2, 6–3 | 6–0, 6–0 | 6–0, 6–1 | 3-0 | 6-0 | 36-6 | 1 |
| (Spain) José Higueras | 2–6, 3–6 | | 6–4, 6–3 | 6–3, 6–4 | 2-1 | 4-2 | 29-26 | 2 |
| (United States) Tim Mayotte | 0–6, 0–6 | 4–6, 3–6 | | 7–6, 4–6, 7–6 | 1–2 | 2-5 | 25-42 | 3 |
| (United States) Vitas Gerulaitis | 0–6, 1–6 | 3–6, 4–6 | 6–7, 6–4, 6–7 | | 0–3 | 1-6 | 26-42 | 4 |

=== Group B ===
| | (United States) Gene Mayer | (Australia) Peter McNamara | (Sweden) Mats Wilander | (United States) Brian Gottfried | RR W–L | Set W–L | Game W–L | Standings |
| (United States) Gene Mayer | | 3-6, 2–6 | 7–6, 7–6 | 6–2, 6-0 | 2-1 | 4-2 | 31-26 | 1 |
| (Australia) Peter McNamara | 6–3, 6–2 | | 6–1, 3–6, 6–3 | 2–6, 2–6 | 2-1 | 4-3 | 31-27 | 2 |
| (Sweden) Mats Wilander | 6–7, 6–7 | 1–6, 6–3, 3–6 | | 6–2, 6–2 | 1-2 | 3-4 | 34-33 | 3 |
| (United States) Brian Gottfried | 2–6, 0–6 | 6–2, 6–2 | 2–6, 2–6 | | 1-2 | 2-4 | 18-28 | 4 |
