= 1982 Player's Canadian Open – Men's singles =

Men's singles
- 1982 Player's Canadian Open

Final
- Champion: (United States) Vitas Gerulaitis
- Runner-up: (Czechoslovakia) Ivan Lendl
- Score: 4–6, 6–1, 6–3

Details
- Draw: 64
- Seeds: 16

Events
| Singles | men | women |
| Doubles | men | women |
| ← 1981 · | Player's Canadian Open | · 1983 → |

Ivan Lendl was the defending champion, but lost in the final this year.

Vitas Gerulaitis won the title, defeating Lendl in the final, 4–6, 6–1, 6–3.

== Seeds ==
1. (United States) John McEnroe (semifinals)
2. (United States) Jimmy Connors (semifinals, defaulted)
3. (Czechoslovakia) Ivan Lendl (final)
4. (United States) Vitas Gerulaitis (champion)
5. (United States) Gene Mayer (first round)
6. (Sweden) Mats Wilander (third round)
7. (Australia) Mark Edmondson (first round)
8. (United States) Steve Denton (quarterfinals)
9. (United States) Tim Mayotte (second round)
10. (United States) Chip Hooper (second round)
11. (Israel) Shlomo Glickstein (quarterfinals)
12. (Poland) Wojtek Fibak (first round)
13. (India) Ramesh Krishnan (third round)
14. (United States) Tim Gullikson (third round)
15. (France) Henri Leconte (quarterfinals)
16. (United States) Eric Fromm (first round)

== Draw ==
=== Key ===
- Q = Qualifier
- WC = Wild card
- LL = Lucky loser
- Alt = Alternate
- SE = Special exempt
- PR = Protected ranking
- ITF = ITF entry
- JE = Junior exempt
- w/o = Walkover
- r = Retired
- d = Defaulted
- SR = Special ranking

=== Finals ===
Semifinals
1 | (United States) John McEnroe | 4 | 4
3 | (Czechoslovakia) Ivan Lendl | 6 | 6
4 | (United States) Vitas Gerulaitis | DEF
2 | (United States) Jimmy Connors

Final
3 | (Czechoslovakia) Ivan Lendl | 6 | 1 | 3
4 | (United States) Vitas Gerulaitis | 4 | 6 | 6

=== Top half ===
==== Section 1 ====
First round
1 | (United States) J McEnroe | 6 | 6
(United States) N Saviano | 2 | 1
(Spain) J Avendaño | 6 | 6
(Canada) R Génois | 2 | 4
(Canada) G Michibata | 7 | 7
(Australia) W Masur | 6 | 5
Q | (United States) D Pate | 4 | 3
9 | (United States) T Mayotte | 6 | 6
15 | (France) H Leconte | 7 | 4 | 6
(France) J Potier | 6 | 6 | 1
(United States) M Estep | 1 | 2
(United States) S McCain | 6 | 6
(Canada) M Wostenholme | 4 | 6 | 6
(United States) R Fagel | 6 | 3 | 4
(United States) B Testerman | 4 | 6 | 6
7 | (Australia) M Edmondson | 6 | 4 | 4

Second round
1 | (United States) J McEnroe | 6 | 6
(Spain) J Avendaño | 2 | 1
(Canada) G Michibata | 4 | 6 | 6
9 | (United States) T Mayotte | 6 | 4 | 3
15 | (France) H Leconte | 6 | 6
(United States) S McCain | 1 | 4
(Canada) M Wostenholme | 2 | 6 | 6
(United States) B Testerman | 6 | 2 | 2

Third round
1 | (United States) J McEnroe | 6 | 7
(Canada) G Michibata | 3 | 6
15 | (France) H Leconte | 6 | 4 | 6
(Canada) M Wostenholme | 2 | 6 | 1

Quarterfinals
1 | (United States) J McEnroe | 7 | 6
15 | (France) H Leconte | 6 | 2

==== Section 2 ====
First round
3 | (Czechoslovakia) I Lendl | 6 | 6
(United States) A Andrews | 1 | 3
(France) C Roger-Vasselin | 6 | 3 | 6
(Zimbabwe) A Pattison | 3 | 6 | 7
(Socialist Federal Republic of Yugoslavia) M Ostoja | 1 | 6 | 3
(Israel) S Krulevitz | 6 | 3 | 6
Q | (United States) J Gurfein | 3 | 3
14 | (United States) T Gullikson | 6 | 6
11 | (Israel) S Glickstein | 7 | 6
Q | (United States) G Holroyd | 6 | 0
(United States) C Dunk | 6 | 4
(South Africa) D Visser | 7 | 6
(West Germany) R Gehring | 1 | 4
(United States) T Waltke | 6 | 6
(United States) T Graham | 3 | 4
6 | (Sweden) M Wilander | 6 | 6

Second round
3 | (Czechoslovakia) I Lendl | 6 | 6
(Zimbabwe) A Pattison | 0 | 4
(Israel) S Krulevitz | 6 | 6 | 1
14 | (United States) T Gullikson | 7 | 4 | 6
11 | (Israel) S Glickstein | 6 | 6
(South Africa) D Visser | 4 | 1
(United States) T Waltke | 3 | 4
6 | (Sweden) M Wilander | 6 | 6

Third round
3 | (Czechoslovakia) I Lendl | 6 | 7
14 | (United States) T Gullikson | 4 | 6
11 | (Israel) S Glickstein | 6 | 7 | 6
6 | (Sweden) M Wilander | 7 | 6 | 4

Quarterfinals
3 | (Czechoslovakia) I Lendl | 6 | 6
11 | (Israel) S Glickstein | 4 | 2

==== Section 3 ====
First round
8 | (United States) S Denton | 6 | 7
(Canada) J Picken | 3 | 5
Q | (United States) Nial Brash | 2 | 6 | 3
(Brazil) C Kirmayr | 6 | 1 | 6
Q | (United States) B Gilbert | 5 | 3
(United States) M Cahill | 7 | 6
(Australia) J Fitzgerald | 7 | 3 | 7
16 | (United States) E Fromm | 6 | 6 | 6
10 | (United States) C Hooper | 7 | 6
(United States) M Doyle | 6 | 3
(Sweden) S Simonsson | 6
(Sweden) A Järryd | 2 | r
Q | (Ecuador) H Núñez | 7 | 1 | 6
(Colombia) A Cortes | 6 | 6 | 7
(Chile) R Acuña | 2 | 3
4 | (United States) V Gerulaitis | 6 | 6

Second round
8 | (United States) S Denton | 3 | 6 | 6
(Brazil) C Kirmayr | 6 | 3 | 0
(United States) M Cahill | 6 | 4 | 6
(Australia) J Fitzgerald | 4 | 6 | 4
10 | (United States) C Hooper | 5 | 2
(Sweden) S Simonsson | 7 | 6
(Colombia) A Cortes | 7 | 3 | 2
4 | (United States) V Gerulaitis | 6 | 6 | 6

Third round
8 | (United States) S Denton | 6 | 6
(United States) M Cahill | 4 | 2
(Sweden) S Simonsson | 2 | 1
4 | (United States) V Gerulaitis | 6 | 6

Quarterfinals
8 | (United States) S Denton | 6 | 3
4 | (United States) V Gerulaitis | 7 | 6

==== Section 4 ====
First round
5 | (United States) G Mayer | 3 | 6 | 6
(France) G Moretton | 6 | 3 | 7
Q | (France) G Forget | 4 | 4
(Spain) J López-Maeso | 6 | 6
(Finland) L Palin | 3 | 4
(South Africa) F Sauer | 6 | 6
(United States) L Bourne | 7 | 4 | 6
12 | (Poland) W Fibak | 6 | 6 | 2
13 | (India) R Krishnan | 2 | 6 | 6
Q | (United States) M Freeman | 6 | 2 | 4
(United States) E Iskersky | 4 | 6 | 2
(Czechoslovakia) S Birner | 6 | 3 | 6
(United States) M Davis | 3 | 6
(United States) J Lapidus | 6 | 7
(Australia) P Cash | 5 | 4
2 | (United States) J Connors | 7 | 6

Second round
(France) G Moretton | 6 | 7
(Spain) J López-Maeso | 3 | 6
(South Africa) F Sauer | 3 | 1
(United States) L Bourne | 6 | 6
13 | (India) R Krishnan | 7 | 2 | 7
(Czechoslovakia) S Birner | 6 | 6 | 6
(United States) J Lapidus | 0 | 3
2 | (United States) J Connors | 6 | 6

Third round
(France) G Moretton | 2 | 4
(United States) L Bourne | 6 | 6
13 | (India) R Krishnan | 5 | 0
2 | (United States) J Connors | 7 | 6

Quarterfinals
(United States) L Bourne | 4 | 2
2 | (United States) J Connors | 6 | 6
