= 1985 Molson Light Challenge – Doubles =

Doubles
- 1985 Toronto Indoor

Final
- Champions: (United States) Peter Fleming (Sweden) Anders Järryd
- Runners-up: (United States) Glenn Layendecker (Canada) Glenn Michibata
- Score: 7–6, 6–2

Details
- Draw: 16
- Seeds: 4

Events
Singles	Doubles
- Toronto Indoor

This was the first edition of the event.

Peter Fleming and Anders Järryd won in the final 7–6, 6–2, against Glenn Layendecker and Glenn Michibata.

== Seeds ==
1. (United States) Peter Fleming / (Sweden) Anders Järryd (champions)
2. (South Africa) Kevin Curren / (Poland) Wojtek Fibak (quarterfinals)
3. (United States) Mike De Palmer / (United States) Sammy Giammalva Jr. (semifinals)
4. (Australia) Brad Drewett / (United States) Mike Leach (first round)

== Draw ==
Key

- Q = Qualifier
- WC = Wild card
- LL = Lucky loser
- Alt = Alternate
- ITF = ITF entry
- PR = Protected ranking
- SR = Special ranking
- SE = Special exempt
- JE = Junior exempt
- JR = Junior Accelerator Programme entrant
- CO = College Accelerator Programme entrant
- NG = Next Gen Accelerator Program entrant
- w/o = Walkover
- r = Retired
- d = Defaulted

=== Draw ===
First round
1	(United States) P Fleming (Sweden) A Järryd	6	6	7
(United States) A Andrews (United States) J Sadri	2	7	6
(Czechoslovakia) I Lendl (United States) G Mayer	6	7
(United States) J Arias (India) R Krishnan	4	5
3	(United States) M De Palmer (United States) S Giammalva Jr.	6	6
(South Africa) B Levine (United States) L Shiras	4	4
(Switzerland) J Hlasek (Czechoslovakia) J Navrátil	6	6
(Canada) J Brabenec (Canada) D Segal	4	0
(United States) C Hooper (United States) V Winitsky	6	6
(United States) B Schultz (Canada) M Wostenholme	4	4
(United States) G Layendecker (Canada) G Michibata	6	6
4	(Australia) B Drewett (United States) M Leach	3	4
(United States) S Meister (United States) E Teltscher	6	4	4
(United States) T Mayotte (United States) B Scanlon	2	6	3^{r}
(United States) B Green (Hungary) Z Kuharszky	5	7	6
2	(South Africa) K Curren (Poland) W Fibak	7	6	7

Quarterfinals
1	(United States) P Fleming (Sweden) A Järryd	6	2	6
(Czechoslovakia) I Lendl (United States) G Mayer	3	6	2
3	(United States) M De Palmer (United States) S Giammalva Jr.	6	4	6
(Switzerland) J Hlasek (Czechoslovakia) J Navrátil	2	6	2
(United States) C Hooper (United States) V Winitsky	2	7	4
(United States) G Layendecker (Canada) G Michibata	6	5	6
(United States) S Meister (United States) E Teltscher	2	6	6
2	(South Africa) K Curren (Poland) W Fibak	6	3	4

Semifinals
1	(United States) P Fleming (Sweden) A Järryd	6	6
3	(United States) M De Palmer (United States) S Giammalva Jr.	3	4
(United States) G Layendecker (Canada) G Michibata	6	6
(United States) S Meister (United States) E Teltscher	1	4

Final
1	(United States) P Fleming (Sweden) A Järryd	7	6
(United States) G Layendecker (Canada) G Michibata	6	2
