= 1980 Player's Canadian Open – Men's singles =

Men's singles
- 1980 Player's Canadian Open

Final
- Champion: (Czechoslovakia) Ivan Lendl
- Runner-up: (Sweden) Björn Borg
- Score: 4–6, 5–4 ret.

Details
- Draw: 64
- Seeds: 16

Events
Singles	men	women
Doubles	men	women
← 1979 ·	Player's Canadian Open	· 1981 →

Björn Borg was the defending champion, but retired in the final against Ivan Lendl due to a knee injury.

== Seeds ==
1. (Sweden) Björn Borg (final, retired because of a knee injury)
2. (United States) John McEnroe (second round, retired because of a twisted ankle)
3. (United States) Vitas Gerulaitis (third round)
4. (Czechoslovakia) Ivan Lendl (champion)
5. (United States) John Sadri (quarterfinals)
6. (Switzerland) Heinz Günthardt (third round)
7. (Mexico) Raúl Ramírez (first round)
8. (United States) Brian Teacher (quarterfinals)
9. (United States) Tim Gullikson (third round)
10. N/A
11. (Zimbabwe) Andrew Pattison (second round)
12. (United States) Peter Rennert (third round)
13. (United States) Butch Walts (third round)
14. N/A
15. (United States) Bruce Manson (first round)

== Draw ==
=== Key ===
- Q = Qualifier
- WC = Wild card
- LL = Lucky loser
- Alt = Alternate
- SE = Special exempt
- PR = Protected ranking
- ITF = ITF entry
- JE = Junior exempt
- w/o = Walkover
- r = Retired
- d = Defaulted
- SR = Special ranking

=== Finals ===
Quarterfinals
1	(Sweden) Björn Borg	6	6
5	(United States) John Sadri	1	4
(United States) Sandy Mayer	6	6
(United States) Tom Leonard	4	2
8	(United States) Brian Teacher	3	6
4	(Czechoslovakia) Ivan Lendl	6	7
(Australia) Paul Kronk	2	6	6
(United States) Trey Waltke	6	3	3

Semifinals
1	(Sweden) Björn Borg	6	6
(United States) Sandy Mayer	0	3
4	(Czechoslovakia) Ivan Lendl	6	6
(Australia) Paul Kronk	2	2

Final
1	(Sweden) Björn Borg	6	4^{r}
4	(Czechoslovakia) Ivan Lendl	4	5

=== Top half ===
==== Section 1 ====
First round
1	(Sweden) B Borg	6	6
Q	(United States) S Rogul	3	2
(United States) To Gullikson	7	6
(Chile) J Fillol	6	3
Q	(Canada) B Cowan	6	6
Q	(United States) B Kleege	4	3
(South Africa) D Schneider	1	1
12	(United States) P Rennert	6	6
(United States) G Hardie	3	6	6
(Australia) C Letcher	6	2	2
(South Africa) R Moore	6	5	7
(United States) B Maze	4	7	6
(United States) B Martin	6	6
(United States) R Fagel	4	3
(Czechoslovakia) J Kodeš	4	3
5	(United States) J Sadri	6	6

Second round
1	(Sweden) B Borg	7	6
(United States) To Gullikson	6	1
Q	(Canada) B Cowan	3	4
12	(United States) P Rennert	6	6
(United States) G Hardie	6	6
(South Africa) R Moore	2	3
(United States) B Martin	6	5
5	(United States) J Sadri	7	7

Third round
1	(Sweden) B Borg	7	4	6
12	(United States) P Rennert	6	6	3
(United States) G Hardie	1	1
5	(United States) J Sadri	6	6

Quarterfinals
1	(Sweden) B Borg	6	6
5	(United States) J Sadri	1	4

==== Section 2 ====
First round
3	(United States) V Gerulaitis	6	6
(United States) T Cain	2	1
(United States) R Fisher	6	6
(Canada) F Synnaeghal	0	0
(Brazil) J Soares	6	6
(Sweden) P Hjertquist	2	0
(United States) S Mayer	6	7
LL	(United States) J Robbins	2	6
(Canada) G Halder	3	7	6
15	(United States) B Manson	6	6	4
(United States) T Leonard	6	6
Q	(United States) J Cohen	1	4
Q	(Chile) Á Fillol	6	6
(Mexico) E Montaño	1	4
(United States) R Van't Hof	4	6	7
7	(Mexico) R Ramírez	6	1	6

Second round
3	(United States) V Gerulaitis	6	6
(United States) R Fisher	2	3
(Brazil) J Soares	0	1
(United States) S Mayer	6	6
(Canada) G Halder	3	3
(United States) T Leonard	6	6
Q	(Chile) Á Fillol	6	6
(United States) R Van't Hof	1	2

Third round
3	(United States) V Gerulaitis	6	3
(United States) S Mayer	7	6
(United States) T Leonard	6	6
Q	(Chile) Á Fillol	4	2

Quarterfinals
(United States) S Mayer	6	6
(United States) T Leonard	4	2

=== Bottom half ===
==== Section 3 ====
First round
8	(United States) B Teacher	6	7
(New Zealand) R Simpson	3	6
(Finland) L Palin	6	2	6
(United States) V Winitsky	4	6	2
(Sweden) S Simonsson	7	6
Q	(Canada) G Michibata	6	2
(United States) M Grant	3	2
13	(United States) B Walts	6	6
9	(United States) Ti Gullikson	6	6	6
(Canada) S Bonneau	0	7	1
(United States) T Wilkison	6	6
Q	(United States) R Meyer	1	4
(Australia) J James	4
(United States) H Schoenfield	0^{r}
(Switzerland) C Dowdeswell	3	1
4	(Czechoslovakia) I Lendl	6	6

Second round
8	(United States) B Teacher	6	7
(Finland) L Palin	3	5
(Sweden) S Simonsson	2	3
13	(United States) B Walts	6	6
9	(United States) Ti Gullikson	6	6
(United States) T Wilkison	4	3
(Australia) J James	2	5
4	(Czechoslovakia) I Lendl	6	7

Third round
8	(United States) B Teacher	6	6	6
13	(United States) B Walts	7	1	1
9	(United States) Ti Gullikson	7	3	4
4	(Czechoslovakia) I Lendl	6	6	6

Quarterfinals
8	(United States) B Teacher	3	6
4	(Czechoslovakia) I Lendl	6	7

==== Section 4 ====
First round
6	(Switzerland) H Günthardt	6	6
(Australia) S Docherty	4	2
(Czechoslovakia) S Birner	6	6	6
(South Africa) B Bertram	7	4	4
(Australia) P Kronk	7	6
(Colombia) Á Betancur	6	1
11	(Zimbabwe) A Pattison	7	6
(United States) G Malin	6	1
(South Africa) K Curren	3	6	7
(Argentina) G Aubone	6	3	6
(United States) T Waltke	6	6
Q	(Canada) B Miller	2	2
(United States) E van Dillen	6	6
(United Kingdom) J Lloyd	2	2
(Canada) M Wostenholme	0	4
2	(United States) J McEnroe	6	6

Second round
6	(Switzerland) H Günthardt	6	6
(Czechoslovakia) S Birner	3	3
(Australia) P Kronk	7	6
11	(Zimbabwe) A Pattison	5	4
(South Africa) K Curren	3	2
(United States) T Waltke	6	6
(United States) E van Dillen	3
2	(United States) J McEnroe	4^{r}

Third round
6	(Switzerland) H Günthardt	2	1
(Australia) P Kronk	6	6
(United States) T Waltke	6	6
(United States) E van Dillen	1	0

Quarterfinals
(Australia) P Kronk	2	6	6
(United States) T Waltke	6	3	3
