= 1982 Montreal Molson Light Challenge =

- 1982 Montreal Molson Light Challenge

Final
- Champion: (United States) Jimmy Connors
- Runner-up: (Sweden) Björn Borg
- Score: 6–4, 6–3

Events
Singles	men	women
Doubles	men	women
← 1981 ·	Montreal Molson Light Challenge	· 1983 →

The 1982 Montreal Molson Light Challenge was a tennis tournament. Jimmy Connors won in the final 6–4, 6–3 against Björn Borg.

== Players ==
1. (United States) Jimmy Connors (champion)
2. (Sweden) Björn Borg (final)
3. (Czechoslovakia) Ivan Lendl (semifinals)
4. (Israel) Shlomo Glickstein (semifinals)
5. (Spain) José Higueras (quarterfinals)
6. (South Africa) Kevin Curren (quarterfinals)
7. (United States) Harold Solomon (quarterfinals)
8. (United States) Tim Mayotte (quarterfinals)

== Draw ==
=== Finals ===
Quarter-finals
1	(United States) Jimmy Connors	7	6
8	(United States) Harold Solomon	5	1
4	(Israel) Shlomo Glickstein	7	5	7
5	(Spain) José Higueras	6	7	5
3	(Czechoslovakia) Ivan Lendl	6	6
6	(United States) Tim Mayotte	4	3
2	(South Africa) Kevin Curren	3	4
7	(Sweden) Björn Borg	6	6

Semi-finals
(United States) Jimmy Connors	6	6
(Israel) Shlomo Glickstein	2	3
(Czechoslovakia) Ivan Lendl	6	6
(Sweden) Björn Borg	7	7

Final
(United States) Jimmy Connors	6	6
(Sweden) Björn Borg	4	3
