= 1990 SkyDome World Tennis Tournament – Singles =

Singles
- 1990 SkyDome World Tennis Tournament

Final
- Champion: (Czechoslovakia) Ivan Lendl
- Runner-up: (United States) Tim Mayotte
- Score: 6–3, 6–0

Details
- Draw: 56
- Seeds: 16

Events
Singles	Doubles
← 1989 ·	SkyDome World Tennis Tournament

Joakim Nyström was the champion of the event when it last took place, in 1986. He did not participate in 1990.
Ivan Lendl won the title, defeating Tim Mayotte 6–3, 6–0, in the final.

== Seeds ==
The top eight seeds receive a bye into the second round.

1. (Czechoslovakia) Ivan Lendl (champion)
2. (United States) Brad Gilbert (semifinals)
3. (United States) John McEnroe (semifinals)
4. (United States) Aaron Krickstein (quarterfinals)
5. (United States) Jay Berger (quarterfinals)
6. (United States) Tim Mayotte (final)
7. (Ecuador) Andrés Gómez (second round)
8. (United States) Kevin Curren (quarterfinals)
9. (United States) Jim Courier (second round)
10. (Peru) Jaime Yzaga (third round)
11. (United States) David Wheaton (first round)
12. (United States) Jim Grabb (first round)
13. (Australia) Wally Masur (first round)
14. (United States) Scott Davis (first round)
15. (United States) Pete Sampras (first round, retired)
16. (France) Jean-Philippe Fleurian (first round)

== Draw ==
=== Key ===
- Q = Qualifier
- WC = Wild card
- LL = Lucky loser
- Alt = Alternate
- SE = Special exempt
- PR = Protected ranking
- ITF = ITF entry
- JE = Junior exempt
- w/o = Walkover
- r = Retired
- d = Defaulted
- SR = Special ranking

=== Finals ===
Quarterfinals
1	(Czechoslovakia) Ivan Lendl	6^{4}	7^{14}	6
8	(United States) Kevin Curren	7^{7}	6^{12}	3
3	(United States) John McEnroe	6	6
5	(United States) Jay Berger	4	0
6	(United States) Tim Mayotte	4	6	7^{7}
4	(United States) Aaron Krickstein	6	4	6^{5}
(Czechoslovakia) Petr Korda	6	6^{5}	2
2	(United States) Brad Gilbert	3	7^{7}	6

Semifinals
1	(Czechoslovakia) Ivan Lendl	6	6
3	(United States) John McEnroe	3	2
6	(United States) Tim Mayotte	6	7^{8}
2	(United States) Brad Gilbert	3	6^{6}

Final
1	(Czechoslovakia) Ivan Lendl	6	6
6	(United States) Tim Mayotte	3	0

=== Top half ===
==== Section 1 ====
First round
Q	(United States) M Washington	4	7^{7}	4
(United States) J Brown	6	6^{2}	6
WC	(United States) P McEnroe	3	1^{r}
(Netherlands) P Haarhuis	6	4
(New Zealand) K Evernden	7^{9}
15	(United States) P Sampras	6^{7}	r
9	(United States) J Courier	6	6
(Australia) D Cahill	0	3
(United States) D Goldie	4	6	3
WC	(Canada) G Connell	6	2	6
Q	(Sweden) O Jonsson	0	4
(Canada) A Sznajder	6	6

Second round
1	(Czechoslovakia) I Lendl	7	6
(United States) J Brown	5	1
(Netherlands) P Haarhuis	6	6^{7}	6
(New Zealand) K Evernden	4	7^{9}	1
9	(United States) J Courier	3	5
WC	(Canada) G Connell	6	7
(Canada) A Sznajder	0	5
8	(United States) K Curren	6	7

Third round
1	(Czechoslovakia) I Lendl	7	6
(Netherlands) P Haarhuis	5	2
WC	(Canada) G Connell	6^{4}	6	1
8	(United States) K Curren	7^{7}	2	6

Quarterfinals
1	(Czechoslovakia) I Lendl	6^{4}	7^{14}	6
8	(United States) K Curren	7^{7}	6^{12}	3

==== Section 2 ====
First round
(United States) D Rostagno	4	5
(United States) P Chamberlin	6	7
(United States) R Matuszewski	6	6
WC	(Canada) C Pridham	1	2
(United States) L Shiras	6	7
14	(United States) S Davis	3	5
11	(United States) D Wheaton	3	7^{9}	2
(Sweden) P Lundgren	6	6^{7}	6
Q	(United States) T Wilkison	2	3
(United States) R Reneberg	6	6
(United States) G Layendecker	1	5
(India) R Krishnan	6	7

Second round
3	(United States) J McEnroe	6	6
(United States) P Chamberlin	3	3
(United States) R Matuszewski	6^{6}	2^{r}
(United States) L Shiras	7^{8}	4
(Sweden) P Lundgren	5	1
(United States) R Reneberg	7	6
(India) R Krishnan	6^{3}	3
5	(United States) J Berger	7^{7}	6

Third round
3	(United States) J McEnroe	6	6
(United States) L Shiras	4	3
(United States) R Reneberg	4	6^{6}
5	(United States) J Berger	6	7^{8}

Quarterfinals
3	(United States) J McEnroe	6	6
5	(United States) J Berger	4	0

=== Bottom half ===
==== Section 3 ====
First round
(United States) J Pugh	6	2
(United Kingdom) J Bates	2	0^{r}
Q	(Mexico) J Lozano	7^{7}	1
(United States) R Seguso	6^{2}	0^{r}
(Czechoslovakia) M Vajda	1	7^{7}	6
12	(United States) J Grabb	6	6^{5}	3
13	(Australia) W Masur	6	6^{6}	3
Q	(Australia) J Fitzgerald	4	7^{8}	6
(United States) T Witsken	7^{7}	4	5
WC	(Canada) M Wostenholme	6^{3}	6	7
(Netherlands) T Nijssen	6	6
(United States) L Duncan	3	3

Second round
6	(United States) T Mayotte	7	5	6
(United States) J Pugh	5	7	3
Q	(Mexico) J Lozano	7	4	7
(Czechoslovakia) M Vajda	5	6	5
Q	(Australia) J Fitzgerald	6	6
WC	(Canada) M Wostenholme	1	1
(Netherlands) T Nijssen	2	2
4	(United States) A Krickstein	6	6

Third round
6	(United States) T Mayotte	6	4	6
Q	(Mexico) J Lozano	2	6	2
Q	(Australia) J Fitzgerald	2	2
4	(United States) A Krickstein	6	6

Quarterfinals
6	(United States) T Mayotte	4	6	7^{7}
4	(United States) A Krickstein	6	4	6^{5}

==== Section 4 ====
First round
WC	(Canada) M Laurendeau	2	2
(Czechoslovakia) P Korda	6	6
Q	(United States) S DeVries	7^{7}	7^{9}
(France) J Potier	6^{3}	6^{7}
(Sweden) N Kroon	4	1
10	(Peru) J Yzaga	6	6
16	(France) J-P Fleurian	6	6^{2}	5
(Czechoslovakia) M Šrejber	3	7^{7}	7
(Socialist Federal Republic of Yugoslavia) B Orešar	6	6^{9}	6
Q	(United States) G Van Emburgh	4	7^{11}	2
(Austria) A Antonitsch	6	7^{9}
(United States) J Arias	4	6^{7}

Second round
7	(Ecuador) A Gómez	3	6	4
(Czechoslovakia) P Korda	6	1	6
Q	(United States) S DeVries	4	2
10	(Peru) J Yzaga	6	6
(Czechoslovakia) M Šrejber	4	6	6
(Socialist Federal Republic of Yugoslavia) B Orešar	6	4	2
(Austria) A Antonitsch	3	3
2	(United States) B Gilbert	6	6

Third round
(Czechoslovakia) P Korda	7^{7}	6
10	(Peru) J Yzaga	6^{1}	4
(Czechoslovakia) M Šrejber	2	2
2	(United States) B Gilbert	6	6

Quarterfinals
(Czechoslovakia) P Korda	6	6^{5}	2
2	(United States) B Gilbert	3	7^{7}	6
