= 1981 Toronto Molson Light Challenge =

- 1981 Toronto Molson Light Challenge

Final
- Champion: (United States) Vitas Gerulaitis
- Runner-up: (United States) John McEnroe
- Score: 6–4, 4–6, 6–3, 6–3
← 1977 ·	Toronto Molson Light Challenge	· 1982 →

Vitas Gerulaitis won the final 6–4, 4–6, 6–3, 6–3 over John McEnroe.

== Players ==
1. (United States) Vitas Gerulaitis (champion)
2. (United States) John McEnroe (final)
3. (Sweden) Björn Borg (semifinals)
4. (United States) Jimmy Connors (semifinals)
5. (United States) Sandy Mayer (round-robin)
6. (South Africa) Johan Kriek (round-robin)
7. (Poland) Wojciech Fibak (round-robin)
8. (Romania) Ilie Năstase (round-robin)

== Draw ==
=== Finals ===
Semi-finals
(United States) Jimmy Connors	7	2	2
(United States) Vitas Gerulaitis	6	6	6
(United States) John McEnroe	6	3	7
(Sweden) Björn Borg	3	6	6

Final
(United States) Vitas Gerulaitis	6	4	6	6
(United States) John McEnroe	4	6	3	3

=== Group A ===
	(United States) Jimmy Connors	(Sweden) Björn Borg	(United States) Sandy Mayer	(Poland) Wojciech Fibak	RR W–L	Set W–L	Game W–L	Standings
(United States) Jimmy Connors		7-5, 6–3	6–4, 6–2	6–3, 6–4	3-0	6-0	37-21	1
(Sweden) Björn Borg	5–7, 3–6		6–4, 3–6, 6–2	6–3, 5–7, 6–3	2-1	4-4	40-38	2
(United States) Sandy Mayer	4–6, 2–6	4–6, 6–3, 2–6		5–7, 6–3, 6–2	1–2	3-5	35-39	3
(Poland) Wojciech Fibak	3–6, 4–6	3–6, 7–5, 3–6	7–5, 3–6, 2–6		0–3	2-6	32-46	4

=== Group B ===
	(United States) John McEnroe	(United States) Vitas Gerulaitis	(South Africa) Johan Kriek	(Romania) Ilie Năstase	RR W–L	Set W–L	Game W–L	Standings
(United States) John McEnroe		6-3, 6–3	6–4, 3–6, 6–3	6–1, 2-0 Def	3-0	6-1	39-20	1
(United States) Vitas Gerulaitis	3–6, 3–6		6–3, 4–6, 6–3	6–1, 6–2	2-1	4-3	34-27	2
(South Africa) Johan Kriek	4–6, 6–3, 3–6	3–6, 6–4, 3–6		6–4, 6–4	1–2	4-4	37-39	3
(Romania) Ilie Năstase	1–6, 0–2 Def	1–6, 2–6	4–6, 4–6		0–3	0-6	12-36	4
