= 1986 Toronto Indoor =

- Date: February 3–9
- Edition: 2nd
- Category: Grand Prix
- Draw: 32S / 16D
- Prize money: $125,000
- Surface: Carpet / indoor
- Location: Toronto, Ontario, Canada

Champions

Singles
- (Sweden) Joakim Nyström

Doubles
- (Poland) Wojtek Fibak / (Sweden) Joakim Nyström
- Toronto Indoor

The 1986 Toronto Indoor (also known as the Corel North American Indoor for sponsorship reasons) was a men's tennis tournament played on indoor carpet courts in Toronto, Ontario, Canada that was part of the 1986 Nabisco Grand Prix. It was the second edition of the tournament and was held from February 3 through February 9, 1986. First-seeded Joakim Nyström won the singles title.

== Finals ==
=== Singles ===
(Sweden) Joakim Nyström defeated (Czechoslovakia) Milan Šrejber, 6–1, 6–4

- It was Nyström's 1st singles title of the year and the 8th of his career.

=== Doubles ===
(Poland) Wojtek Fibak / (Sweden) Joakim Nyström defeated (South Africa) Christo Steyn / (South Africa) Danie Visser, 6–3, 7–6
