= 1986 Toronto Indoor – Singles =

Singles
- 1986 Toronto Indoor

Final
- Champion: (Sweden) Joakim Nyström
- Runner-up: (Czechoslovakia) Milan Šrejber
- Score: 6–1, 6–4

Details
- Draw: 32
- Seeds: 8

Events
Singles	Doubles
- Toronto Indoor

Kevin Curren was the defending champion, but did not participate this year.

Joakim Nyström won the tournament, beating Milan Šrejber in the final, 6–1, 6–4.

== Seeds ==
1. (Sweden) Joakim Nyström (champion)
2. (United States) Aaron Krickstein (first round)
3. (Poland) Wojtek Fibak (first round)
4. (United States) Jonathan Canter (semifinals)
5. (South Africa) Christo Steyn (first round)
6. (Mexico) Francisco Maciel (first round)
7. (Israel) Shahar Perkiss (second round)
8. (United States) Mark Dickson (first round)

== Draw ==
Key

- Q = Qualifier
- WC = Wild card
- LL = Lucky loser
- Alt = Alternate
- ITF = ITF entry
- PR = Protected ranking
- SR = Special ranking
- SE = Special exempt
- JE = Junior exempt
- JR = Junior Accelerator Programme entrant
- CO = College Accelerator Programme entrant
- NG = Next Gen Accelerator Program entrant
- w/o = Walkover
- r = Retired
- d = Defaulted

=== Finals ===
Semifinals
1	(Sweden) Joakim Nyström	7	6
4	(United States) Jonathan Canter	6	3
(United States) Peter Fleming	2	7	3
Q	(Czechoslovakia) Milan Šrejber	6	6	6

Final
1	(Sweden) Joakim Nyström	6	6
Q	(Czechoslovakia) Milan Šrejber	1	4

=== Top half ===
First round
1	(Sweden) J Nyström	6	4	7
(Israel) A Mansdorf	4	6	5
(Argentina) R Saad	6	4	0
WC	(Canada) A Sznajder	3	6	6
(United Kingdom) J Bates	6	6
(Canada) S Bonneau	2	2
(Sweden) J Svensson	2	6	6
8	(United States) M Dickson	6	1	2
4	(United States) J Canter	4	6	6
(United States) M Flur	6	1	4
(Sweden) S Eriksson	3	7	3
(Romania) F Segărceanu	6	6	6
Q	(United States) C Dunk	6	6
(New Zealand) R Simpson	4	3
(United States) B Green	6	7
5	(South Africa) C Steyn	2	6

Second round
1	(Sweden) J Nyström	6	6
WC	(Canada) A Sznajder	3	2
(United Kingdom) J Bates	1	4
(Sweden) J Svensson	6	6
4	(United States) J Canter	6	7
(Romania) F Segărceanu	4	5
Q	(United States) C Dunk	1	5
(United States) B Green	6	7

Quarterfinals
1	(Sweden) J Nyström	2	6	6
(Sweden) J Svensson	6	4	3
4	(United States) J Canter	7	6
(United States) B Green	6	4

Semifinals
1	(Sweden) J Nyström	7	6
4	(United States) J Canter	6	3

=== Bottom half ===
First round
7	(Israel) S Perkiss	4	6	6
(Socialist Federal Republic of Yugoslavia) B Orešar	6	2	1
Q	(South Africa) E Edwards	3	4
(Canada) G Michibata	6	6
(Canada) M Wostenholme	6	4	4
(United States) P Fleming	2	6	6
(United States) L Shiras	6	7
3	(Poland) W Fibak	3	6
6	(Mexico) F Maciel	2	1
Q	(Czechoslovakia) M Šrejber	6	6
WC	(Canada) H McDadi	4	5
(Brazil) C Kirmayr	6	7
Q	(United States) D Saltz	4	4
(West Germany) R Osterthun	6	6
(United States) G Layendecker	3	6	7
2	(United States) A Krickstein	6	3	6

Second round
7	(Israel) S Perkiss	1	4
(Canada) G Michibata	6	6
(United States) P Fleming	6	3	6
(United States) L Shiras	4	6	4
Q	(Czechoslovakia) M Šrejber	6	6	6
(Brazil) C Kirmayr	2	7	4
(West Germany) R Osterthun	6	3	4
(United States) G Layendecker	4	6	6

Quarterfinals
(Canada) G Michibata	3	1
(United States) P Fleming	6	6
Q	(Czechoslovakia) M Šrejber	6	7
(United States) G Layendecker	2	6

Semifinals
(United States) P Fleming	2	7	3
Q	(Czechoslovakia) M Šrejber	6	6	6
