= 1983 Player's Canadian Open – Women's singles =

Women's singles
- 1983 Player's Canadian Open

Final
- Champion: (United States) Martina Navratilova
- Runner-up: (United States) Chris Evert-Lloyd
- Score: 6–4, 4–6, 6–1

Details
- Draw: 56 (8Q/2LL)
- Seeds: 14

Events
Singles	men	women
Doubles	men	women
- Canadian Open

Martina Navratilova successfully defended her title by defeating Chris Evert-Lloyd 6–4, 4–6, 6–1 in the final.

== Seeds ==
The top eight seeds received a bye into the second round.

1. (United States) Martina Navratilova (champion)
2. (United States) Chris Evert-Lloyd (final)
3. (United States) Andrea Jaeger (quarterfinals)
4. (West Germany) Sylvia Hanika (third round)
5. (Czechoslovakia) Hana Mandlíková (semifinals)
6. (United States) ~~Zina Garrison~~ (withdrew)
7. (United States) Kathy Rinaldi (third round)
8. (West Germany) Claudia Kohde (quarterfinals)
9. (United Kingdom) Jo Durie (first round)
10. (West Germany) Eva Pfaff (third round)
11. (United States) Kathy Jordan (quarterfinals)
12. (Canada) Carling Bassett (first round)
13. (Czechoslovakia) Helena Suková (third round)
14. (United States) Kathleen Horvath (quarterfinals)

== Draw ==
Key

- Q = Qualifier
- WC = Wild card
- LL = Lucky loser
- Alt = Alternate
- ITF = ITF entry
- PR = Protected ranking
- SR = Special ranking
- SE = Special exempt
- JE = Junior exempt
- JR = Junior Accelerator Programme entrant
- CO = College Accelerator Programme entrant
- NG = Next Gen Accelerator Program entrant
- w/o = Walkover
- r = Retired
- d = Defaulted

=== Finals ===
Quarterfinals
1	(United States) Martina Navratilova	6	6
14	(United States) Kathleen Horvath	2	4
3	(United States) Andrea Jaeger	3	2
5	(Czechoslovakia) Hana Mandlíková	6	6
(United States) Elise Burgin	6	3	6
11	(United States) Kathy Jordan	4	6	1
8	(West Germany) Claudia Kohde	1	5
2	(United States) Chris Evert-Lloyd	6	7

Semifinals
1	(United States) Martina Navratilova	6	7
5	(Czechoslovakia) Hana Mandlíková	1	5
(United States) Elise Burgin	2	0
2	(United States) Chris Evert-Lloyd	6	6

Final
1	(United States) Martina Navratilova	6	4	6
2	(United States) Chris Evert-Lloyd	4	6	1

=== Top half ===
==== Section 1 ====
First round
(United States) T Phelps	6	6
(South Africa) Y Vermaak	4	2
(United States) S Mascarin	1	2
(Argentina) I Madruga-Osses	6	6
(United States) C Reynolds	3	6
10	(West Germany) E Pfaff	6	7
14	(United States) K Horvath	6	6
(United States) L Bonder	3	2
(Canada) K Dewis	0	1
(United Kingdom) A Hobbs	6	6
(France) C Vanier	6	1	2
Q	(United States) K Shaefer	0	6	6

Second round
1	(United States) M Navratilova	6	6
(United States) T Phelps	3	1
(Argentina) I Madruga-Osses	6	0	2
10	(West Germany) E Pfaff	2	6	6
14	(United States) K Horvath	6	6
(United Kingdom) A Hobbs	4	2
Q	(United States) K Shaefer	5	4
7	(United States) K Rinaldi	7	6

Third round
1	(United States) M Navratilova	4	6	7
10	(West Germany) E Pfaff	6	4	5
14	(United States) K Horvath	7^{7}	6
7	(United States) K Rinaldi	6^{4}	2

Quarterfinals
1	(United States) M Navratilova	6	6
14	(United States) K Horvath	2	4

==== Section 2 ====
First round
Q	(Japan) E Inoue	6	6
(United States) C Benjamin	3	2
(United Kingdom) S Barker	6	6
(South Africa) J Mundel	3	2
(United States) B Herr	6^{2}	4
(United States) A Kiyomura	7^{7}	6
12	(Canada) C Bassett	2	1
(Socialist Federal Republic of Yugoslavia) M Jaušovec	6	6
LL	(United States) B Norton	6^{3}	6	2
(Italy) R Reggi	7^{7}	3	6
(United States) S Collins	5	6	6
(United States) H Ludloff	7	3	1

Second round
3	(United States) A Jaeger	6	6
Q	(Japan) E Inoue	1	2
(United Kingdom) S Barker	6	6
(United States) A Kiyomura	3	2
(Socialist Federal Republic of Yugoslavia) M Jaušovec	6	7
(Italy) R Reggi	2	6
(United States) S Collins	4	6^{2}
5	(Czechoslovakia) H Mandlíková	6	7^{7}

Third round
3	(United States) A Jaeger	6	6
(United Kingdom) S Barker	0	0
(Socialist Federal Republic of Yugoslavia) M Jaušovec	2	2
5	(Czechoslovakia) H Mandlíková	6	6

Quarterfinals
3	(United States) A Jaeger	3	2
5	(Czechoslovakia) H Mandlíková	6	6

=== Bottom half ===
==== Section 3 ====
First round
(United States) V Nelson	6	5	3
(Canada) J Hetherington	2	7	6
(Canada) A Walker	2	4
(United States) E Burgin	6	6
Q	(Austria) P Huber	3	0
Q	(Sweden) L Sandin	6	6
11	(United States) K Jordan	2	6	6
(United States) S Walsh	6	2	3
(South Africa) R Fairbank	1	6^{1}
(United States) P Casale	6	7^{7}
Q	(Brazil) P Medrado	6	6
(United States) Le Allen	2	3

Second round
LL	(Romania) L Romanov	6	4	6
(Canada) J Hetherington	3	6	2
(United States) E Burgin	6	5	6
Q	(Sweden) L Sandin	1	7	3
11	(United States) K Jordan	6	6
(United States) P Casale	3	4
Q	(Brazil) P Medrado	2	6^{3}
4	(West Germany) S Hanika	6	7^{7}

Third round
LL	(Romania) L Romanov	3	2
(United States) E Burgin	6	6
11	(United States) K Jordan	7^{7}	4	6
4	(West Germany) S Hanika	6^{5}	6	4

Quarterfinals
(United States) E Burgin	6	3	6
11	(United States) K Jordan	4	6	1

==== Section 4 ====
First round
(Czechoslovakia) K Skronská	1	2
(United States) B Nagelsen	6	6
Q	(Australia) S Leo	6	6	6
(Italy) S Simmonds	7	3	4
(Czechoslovakia) I Budařová	6	6
9	(United Kingdom) J Durie	4	3
13	(Czechoslovakia) H Suková	4	6	7^{7}
Q	(Australia) A Minter	6	1	6^{4}
(Switzerland) C Jolissaint	2	6	6
(United States) R Casals	6	3	4
Q	(United States) K Steinmetz	4	6	6
(United States) A Moulton	6	1	7

Second round
8	(West Germany) C Kohde	6	6
(United States) B Nagelsen	4	1
Q	(Australia) S Leo	5	5
(Czechoslovakia) I Budařová	7	7
13	(Czechoslovakia) H Suková	6	6
(Switzerland) C Jolissaint	4	1
(United States) A Moulton	3	6	3
2	(United States) C Evert-Lloyd	6	4	6

Third round
8	(West Germany) C Kohde	6	6
(Czechoslovakia) I Budařová	2	1
13	(Czechoslovakia) H Suková	7^{7}	2	0
2	(United States) C Evert-Lloyd	6^{5}	6	6

Quarterfinals
8	(West Germany) C Kohde	1	5
2	(United States) C Evert-Lloyd	6	7

== See also ==
- Evert–Navratilova rivalry
