= 1983 Player's Canadian Open – Women's doubles =

Women's doubles
- 1983 Player's Canadian Open

Final
- Champions: (United Kingdom) Anne Hobbs (United States) Andrea Jaeger
- Runners-up: (South Africa) Rosalyn Fairbank (United States) Candy Reynolds
- Score: 6–4, 5–7, 7–5

Details
- Draw: 32
- Seeds: 8

Events
Singles	men	women
Doubles	men	women
- Canadian Open

Martina Navratilova and Candy Reynolds were the defending champions, but they chose to compete this year with different partners.

Navratilova teamed up with Rosie Casals and lost in the quarterfinals to Anne Hobbs and Andrea Jaeger.

Reynolds teamed up with Rosalyn Fairbank and the pair lost in the final, also to Hobbs and Jaeger. The score was 6–4, 5–7, 7–5.

== Seeds ==
1. (United States) Rosie Casals / (United States) Martina Navratilova (quarterfinals)
2. (South Africa) Rosalyn Fairbank / (United States) Candy Reynolds (final)
3. (West Germany) Claudia Kohde / (West Germany) Eva Pfaff (quarterfinals)
4. (United States) Billie Jean King / (United States) Sharon Walsh (semifinals)
5. (Socialist Federal Republic of Yugoslavia) Mima Jaušovec / (United States) Kathy Jordan (semifinals)
6. (United Kingdom) Jo Durie / (United States) Ann Kiyomura (quarterfinals)
7. (United Kingdom) Anne Hobbs / (United States) Andrea Jaeger (champions)
8. (Czechoslovakia) Hana Mandlíková / (United States) Betsy Nagelsen (quarterfinals)

== Draw ==
Key

- Q = Qualifier
- WC = Wild card
- LL = Lucky loser
- Alt = Alternate
- ITF = ITF entry
- PR = Protected ranking
- SR = Special ranking
- SE = Special exempt
- JE = Junior exempt
- JR = Junior Accelerator Programme entrant
- CO = College Accelerator Programme entrant
- NG = Next Gen Accelerator Program entrant
- w/o = Walkover
- r = Retired
- d = Defaulted

=== Finals ===
Semifinals
7	(United Kingdom) Anne Hobbs (United States) Andrea Jaeger	7^{7}	6
5	(Socialist Federal Republic of Yugoslavia) Mima Jaušovec (United States) Kathy Jordan	6^{3}	3
4	(United States) Billie Jean King (United States) Sharon Walsh	2	6^{2}
2	(South Africa) Rosalyn Fairbank (United States) Candy Reynolds	6	7^{7}

Final
7	(United Kingdom) Anne Hobbs (United States) Andrea Jaeger	6	5	7
2	(South Africa) Rosalyn Fairbank (United States) Candy Reynolds	4	7	5

=== Top half ===
First round
1	(United States) R Casals (United States) M Navratilova	6	6
(South Africa) I Kloss (United States) H Ludloff	2	4
(United States) B Jordan (Australia) E Sayers	6	7
(Czechoslovakia) I Budařová (Czechoslovakia) M Skuherská	3	5
(United States) L Bonder (United States) V Nelson	6^{3}	3
(Romania) L Romanov (Sweden) L Sandin	7^{7}	6
(United States) P Casale (Italy) R Reggi	1	1
7	(United Kingdom) A Hobbs (United States) A Jaeger	6	6
3	(West Germany) C Kohde (West Germany) E Pfaff	6	6
(United States) A Moulton (United States) P Smith	2	2
(Switzerland) L Drescher (United States) T Mochizuki	2	0
(Australia) A Minter (Australia) E Minter	6	6
(United States) B Norton (United States) K Shaefer	4	6^{3}
(Australia) B Remilton (Japan) N Sato	6	7^{7}
(United States) H Manset (United States) F Raschiatore	3	2
5	(Socialist Federal Republic of Yugoslavia) M Jaušovec (United States) K Jordan	6	6

Second round
1	(United States) R Casals (United States) M Navratilova	6^{5}	6	6
(United States) B Jordan (Australia) E Sayers	7^{7}	4	1
(Romania) L Romanov (Sweden) L Sandin	4	1
7	(United Kingdom) A Hobbs (United States) A Jaeger	6	6
3	(West Germany) C Kohde (West Germany) E Pfaff	7^{7}	6
(Australia) A Minter (Australia) E Minter	6^{3}	1
(Australia) B Remilton (Japan) N Sato	1	2
5	(Socialist Federal Republic of Yugoslavia) M Jaušovec (United States) K Jordan	6	6

Quarterfinals
1	(United States) R Casals (United States) M Navratilova	6^{6}	4
7	(United Kingdom) A Hobbs (United States) A Jaeger	7^{8}	6
3	(West Germany) C Kohde (West Germany) E Pfaff	0	6^{4}
5	(Socialist Federal Republic of Yugoslavia) M Jaušovec (United States) K Jordan	6	7^{7}

Semifinals
7	(United Kingdom) A Hobbs (United States) A Jaeger	7^{7}	6
5	(Socialist Federal Republic of Yugoslavia) M Jaušovec (United States) K Jordan	6^{3}	3

=== Bottom half ===
First round
8	(Czechoslovakia) H Mandlíková (United States) B Nagelsen	7	6
(United States) A Henricksson (Switzerland) C Jolissaint	5	4
(Socialist Federal Republic of Yugoslavia) S Goleš (Socialist Federal Republic of Yugoslavia) R Šašak	6	2	6
(United States) S Mascarin (United States) K Rinaldi	2	6	1
(United States) C Benjamin (France) C Vanier	1	6	6
(United States) Le Allen (Argentina) I Madruga-Osses	6	3	3
(United States) K Horvath (South Africa) Y Vermaak	4	2
4	(United States) BJ King (United States) S Walsh	6	6
6	(United Kingdom) J Durie (United States) A Kiyomura	6	7^{7}
(New Zealand) C Newton (Australia) P Whytcross	0	6^{2}
(Australia) S Leo (Brazil) C Monteiro	4	3
(Netherlands) B Stöve (Czechoslovakia) H Suková	6	6
(Brazil) P Medrado (Czechoslovakia) K Skronská	6	4	3
(Canada) J Hetherington (Canada) H Pelletier	4	6	6
(Canada) C Bassett (Hungary) A Temesvári	7^{7}	0	1
2	(South Africa) R Fairbank (United States) C Reynolds	6^{2}	6	6

Second round
8	(Czechoslovakia) H Mandlíková (United States) B Nagelsen	6	6
(Socialist Federal Republic of Yugoslavia) S Goleš (Socialist Federal Republic of Yugoslavia) R Šašak	2	2
(United States) C Benjamin (France) C Vanier	1	1
4	(United States) BJ King (United States) S Walsh	6	6
6	(United Kingdom) J Durie (United States) A Kiyomura	6	6
(Netherlands) B Stöve (Czechoslovakia) H Suková	4	4
(Canada) J Hetherington (Canada) H Pelletier	1	2
2	(South Africa) R Fairbank (United States) C Reynolds	6	6

Quarterfinals
8	(Czechoslovakia) H Mandlíková (United States) B Nagelsen	4	0
4	(United States) BJ King (United States) S Walsh	6	6
6	(United Kingdom) J Durie (United States) A Kiyomura	6	4	1
2	(South Africa) R Fairbank (United States) C Reynolds	4	6	6

Semifinals
4	(United States) BJ King (United States) S Walsh	2	6^{2}
2	(South Africa) R Fairbank (United States) C Reynolds	6	7^{7}
