= 1982 Toronto Molson Light Challenge =

- 1982 Toronto Molson Light Challenge

Final
- Champion: (Czechoslovakia) Ivan Lendl
- Runner-up: (United States) John McEnroe
- Score: 7–5, 3–6, 7–6, 7–5
← 1981 ·	Toronto Molson Light Challenge	· 1983 →

The 1982 Toronto Molson Light Challenge was a tennis tournament, won by Ivan Lendl 7–5, 3–6, 7–6, 7–5 against John McEnroe.

== Players ==
1. (Czechoslovakia) Ivan Lendl (champion)
2. (United States) John McEnroe (final)
3. (United States) Vitas Gerulaitis (semifinals)
4. (Australia) Peter McNamara (semifinals)
5. (United States) Jimmy Connors (round-robin)
6. (United States) Roscoe Tanner (round-robin)
7. (United States) Eliot Teltscher (round-robin)
8. (Italy) Adriano Panatta (round-robin)

== Draw ==
=== Finals ===
Semi-finals
(Czechoslovakia) Ivan Lendl	6	6
(United States) Vitas Gerulaitis	2	0
(United States) John McEnroe	6	6
(Australia) Peter McNamara	2	4

Final
(Czechoslovakia) Ivan Lendl	7	3	7	7
(United States) John McEnroe	5	6	6	5

=== Group A ===
	(Czechoslovakia) Ivan Lendl	(Australia) Peter McNamara	(United States) Jimmy Connors	(United States) Eliot Teltscher	RR W–L	Set W–L	Game W–L	Standings
(Czechoslovakia) Ivan Lendl		6-4, 6–4	6–4, 6–3	6–3, 6–2	3-0	6-0	36-20	1
(Australia) Peter McNamara	4–6, 4–6		6–3, 3–6, 6–4	6–7, 6–4, 6–1	2-1	4-4	41-37	2
(United States) Jimmy Connors	4–6, 3–6	3–6, 6–3, 4–6		6–3, 6–2	1–2	3-4	32-32	3
(United States) Eliot Teltscher	3–6, 2–6	7–6, 4–6, 1–6	3–6, 2–6		0–3	1-6	22-42	4

=== Group B ===
	(United States) John McEnroe	(United States) Vitas Gerulaitis	(United States) Roscoe Tanner	(Italy) Adriano Panatta	RR W–L	Set W–L	Game W–L	Standings
(United States) John McEnroe		7-6, 7–5	6–3, 6–2	6–3, 6-2	3-0	6-0	38-21	1
(United States) Vitas Gerulaitis	6–7, 5–7		7–6, 4–6, 6–4	6–2, 6–3	2-1	4-3	40-35	2
(United States) Roscoe Tanner	3–6, 2–6	6–7, 6–4, 4–6		6–2, 7–5	1–2	3-4	34-36	3
(Italy) Adriano Panatta	3–6, 2–6	2–6, 3–6	2–6, 5–7		0–3	0-6	17-37	4
