= 1984 Toronto Molson Light Challenge =

- 1984 Toronto Molson Light Challenge

Final
- Champion: (Czechoslovakia) Ivan Lendl
- Runner-up: (France) Yannick Noah
- Score: 6–0, 6–2, 6–4
- Toronto Molson Light Challenge

Ivan Lendl won in the final 6–0, 6–2, 6–4 against Yannick Noah.

== Players ==
1. (Czechoslovakia) Ivan Lendl (champion)
2. (France) Yannick Noah (final)
3. (United States) Jimmy Connors (semifinals, withdrew due to neck injury)
4. (Poland) Wojciech Fibak (semifinals)
5. (Canada) Glenn Michibata (round-robin)
6. (United States) Gene Mayer (round-robin)
7. (Spain) José Higueras (round-robin)
8. (Argentina) Guillermo Vilas (round-robin)

== Draw ==
=== Finals ===
Semi-finals
(France) Yannick Noah	5	7	6	2	6
(Poland) Wojciech Fibak	7	5	3	6	4
(United States) Jimmy Connors
(Czechoslovakia) Ivan Lendl	W/O

Final
(United States) Yannick Noah	0	2	4
(Czechoslovakia) Ivan Lendl	6	6	6

=== Group A ===
	(France) Yannick Noah	(United States) Jimmy Connors	(Canada) Glenn Michibata	(Spain) José Higueras	RR W–L	Set W–L	Game W–L	Standings
(France) Yannick Noah		6-4, 6–4	6–4, 6–4	6–2, 7–6	3-0	6-0	37-24	1
(United States) Jimmy Connors	4–6, 4–6		6–4, 7–6	6–2, 6–2	2-1	4-2	33-26	2
(Canada) Glenn Michibata	4–6, 4–6	4–6, 6–7		7–6, 6–4	1–2	2-4	31-35	3
(Spain) José Higueras	2–6, 6–7	2–6, 2–6	6–7, 4–6		0-3	0-6	22-38	4

=== Group B ===
	(Czechoslovakia) Ivan Lendl	(Poland) Wojciech Fibak	(United States) Gene Mayer	(Argentina) Guillermo Vilas	RR W–L	Set W–L	Game W–L	Standings
(Czechoslovakia) Ivan Lendl		6-2, 6–3	6–2, 6–1	6–4, 6-2	3-0	6-0	36-14	1
(Poland) Wojciech Fibak	2–6, 3–6		6–2, 6–1	7–5, 6–3	2-1	4-2	30-23	2
(United States) Gene Mayer	2–6, 1–6	2–6, 1–6		6–2, 6–0	1-2	2-4	18-26	3
(Argentina) Guillermo Vilas	4–6, 2–6	5–7, 3–6	2–6, 0–6		0-3	0-6	16-37	4
