= 1983 Player's Canadian Open =

- Date: August 8–14 (men); August 15–21 (women)
- Edition: 94th
- Surface: Hard / outdoor
- Location: Montreal, Quebec, Canada (men); Toronto, Ontario, Canada (women)

Champions

Men's singles
- (Czechoslovakia) Ivan Lendl

Women's singles
- (United States) Martina Navratilova

Men's doubles
- (United States) Sandy Mayer / (United States) Ferdi Taygan

Women's doubles
- (United Kingdom) Anne Hobbs / (United States) Andrea Jaeger
- Canadian Open

The 1983 Player's International Canadian Open was a tennis tournament played on outdoor hard courts. The men's tournament was held at the Jarry Park Stadium in Montreal in Canada and was part of the 1983 Volvo Grand Prix while the women's tournament was held at the National Tennis Centre in Toronto in Canada and was part of the 1983 Virginia Slims World Championship Series. The men's tournament was held from August 8 through August 14, 1983, while the women's tournament was held from August 15 through August 21, 1983.

== Finals ==
=== Men's singles ===
(Czechoslovakia) Ivan Lendl defeated (Sweden) Anders Järryd 6–2, 6–2

- It was Lendl's 5th title of the year and the 39th of his career.

=== Women's singles ===
(United States) Martina Navratilova defeated (United States) Chris Evert-Lloyd 6–4, 4–6, 6–1

- It was Navratilova's 20th title of the year and the 170th of her career.

=== Men's doubles ===
(United States) Sandy Mayer / (United States) Ferdi Taygan defeated (United States) Tim Gullikson / (United States) Tom Gullikson 6–3, 6–4

- It was Mayer's 2nd title of the year and the 30th of his career. It was Taygan's only title of the year and the 18th of his career.

=== Women's doubles ===
(United Kingdom) Anne Hobbs / (United States) Andrea Jaeger defeated (South Africa) Rosalyn Fairbank / (United States) Candy Reynolds 6–4, 5–7, 7–5

- It was Hobbs' 3rd title of the year and the 4th of her career. It was Jaeger's 2nd title of the year and the 11th of her career.

== See also ==
- Evert–Navratilova rivalry
