= John Picken (tennis) =

Canadian tennis player

- Country (sports): Canada
- Born: August 9, 1957 (age 68) Vancouver, British Columbia, Canada
- Plays: Right-handed

Singles
- Career record: 3–4 (Grand Prix & Davis Cup)
- Highest ranking: No. 353 (Jan 2, 1984)

Doubles
- Career record: 0–5 (Grand Prix & Davis Cup)
- Highest ranking: No. 223 (Jan 2, 1984)

John Picken (born August 9, 1957) is a Canadian former professional tennis player.

Picken, a two-time national champion in the under-18s, grew up in Burnaby, British Columbia and represented the Canada Davis Cup team from 1979 to 1983, registering wins in three singles rubbers.

Before competing professionally in the 1980s he played collegiate tennis for Pan American University, where he had fellow Canadians Josef Brabenec and Robert Bettauer as teammates.

== See also ==
- List of Canada Davis Cup team representatives
