= Todd Lundy =

American tennis player

- Country (sports): United States
- Born: February 17, 1956 (age 70) Madison, Wisconsin, U.S.

Singles
- Career record: 0–3
- Highest ranking: No. 261 (Jan 1, 1982)

Doubles
- Career record: 0–1
- Highest ranking: No. 455 (Jan 3, 1983)

Todd Lundy (born February 17, 1956) is an American former professional tennis player.

A native of Pennsylvania, Lundy won three successive PIAA state singles championships from 1972 to 1974, while attending State College. He went on to study at Harvard University and was a member of the varsity tennis team.

In 1981 he featured in three singles main draws on the professional Grand Prix circuit.

Lundy is now an attorney in Denver, Colorado.
