= Rick Meyers =

American tennis player

- Country (sports): United States
- Born: May 14, 1958 (age 66)
- Height: 5 ft 8 in (173 cm)
- Plays: Right-handed

Singles
- Career record: 1–2
- Highest ranking: No. 415 (Jan 4, 1982)

Grand Slam singles results
- Australian Open: Q1 (1981, 1984)
- Wimbledon: Q1 (1982)

Doubles
- Career record: 1–4
- Highest ranking: No. 409 (Jan 3, 1983)

Rick Meyers (born May 14, 1958) is an American former professional tennis player.

Born and raised in Abilene, Texas, Meyers won a 5A state singles championship while at Cooper High School and played collegiate tennis for Texas Christian University, where he was named All-Southwest Conference all four years.

Meyers was a main draw qualifier for the 1981 Canadian Open and fell in the first round to the sixth-seeded player Eliot Teltscher. He also made a Grand Prix tournament appearance at the Caracas Open in 1982 and was eliminated in the second round by Eddie Dibbs, after a win over Roberto Vizcaíno.

In 2008 he was inducted into the Texas Tennis Hall of Fame.
