= 1981 Player's Canadian Open =

- Date: August 10–16 (men); August 17–23 (women)
- Edition: 92nd
- Surface: Hard / outdoor
- Location: Montreal, Quebec, Canada (men); Toronto, Ontario, Canada (women)

Champions

Men's singles
- (Czechoslovakia) Ivan Lendl

Women's singles
- (United States) Tracy Austin

Men's doubles
- (Mexico) Raúl Ramírez / (United States) Ferdi Taygan

Women's doubles
- (United States) Martina Navratilova / (United States) Pam Shriver
- Canadian Open

The 1981 Player's International Canadian Open was a tennis tournament played on outdoor hard courts. The men's tournament was held at the Jarry Park Stadium in Montreal in Canada and was part of the 1981 Volvo Grand Prix while the women's tournament was held at the National Tennis Centre in Toronto in Canada and was part of the 1981 WTA Tour. The men's tournament was held from August 10 through August 16, 1981, while the women's tournament was held from August 17 through August 23, 1981.

== Finals ==
=== Men's singles ===
(Czechoslovakia) Ivan Lendl defeated (United States) Eliot Teltscher 6–3, 6–2

- It was Lendl's 3rd title of the year and the 12th of his career.

=== Women's singles ===
(United States) Tracy Austin defeated (United States) Chris Evert-Lloyd 6–1, 6–4

- It was Austin's 3rd title of the year and the 30th of her career.

=== Men's doubles ===
(Mexico) Raúl Ramírez / (United States) Ferdi Taygan defeated (United States) Peter Fleming / (United States) John McEnroe 2–6, 7–6, 6–4

- It was Ramírez's 5th title of the year and the 71st of his career. It was Taygan's 3rd title of the year and the 7th of his career.

=== Women's doubles ===
(United States) Martina Navratilova / (United States) Pam Shriver defeated (United States) Candy Reynolds / (United States) Anne Smith 7–6, 7–6

- It was Navratilova's 11th title of the year and the 112th of her career. It was Shriver's 6th title of the year and the 16th of her career.
