= Robert Bettauer =

Canadian tennis broadcaster

- Country (sports): Canada
- Born: May 2, 1956 (age 69) Berlin, Germany
- Height: 5 ft 10 in (178 cm)
- Plays: Right-handed

Singles
- Career record: 0–3
- Highest ranking: No. 397 (Jan 16, 1978)

Doubles
- Career record: 1–6
- Highest ranking: No. 386 (Jan 02, 1978)

Grand Slam doubles results
- French Open: 1R (1980)

Robert Bettauer (born May 2, 1956) is a Canadian tennis broadcaster and former Davis Cup and professional player, reaching a career high ATP Tour singles ranking of 397 and doubles ranking of 386 in 1978. He is also a former national tennis coach who led the 1988 and 1992 Olympics teams.

Bettauer, Berlin-born, was raised in Vancouver and played collegiate tennis for Pan American University from 1974 to 1978, before turning professional in 1978. He made the singles main draw of three Canadian Opens and was a Davis Cup player in 1979, for ties against the Caribbean and Mexico. In 1980 he played in the doubles main draw of the French Open.

Bettauer has a long history in senior sport leadership positions in Canada with previous roles as Director of Tennis Development for Tennis Canada (1988-1998), founding President and CEO of what is now the Canadian Sport Institute Ontario (1998-2005) and currently as the CEO of PISE (Pacific Institute for Sport Education) in Victoria, Canada since 2010.

== See also ==
- List of Canada Davis Cup team representatives
