= Toronto Indoor =

Defunct tennis tournament
- Event name: Toronto Molson Light Challenge (1981–85); Corel North American Indoor (1986); SkyDome World Tennis (1990)
- Tour: WCT circuit (1972–77); Grand Prix circuit (1985–86); ATP Tour (1990)
- Founded: 1972
- Abolished: 1990
- Editions: 14
- Location: Toronto, Ontario, Canada (1971–86/1990)
- Venue: Maple Leaf Gardens; Skydome (1990)
- Surface: Carpet (i) (1985–86/1990)

The Toronto Indoor (also known as Toronto Molson Light Challenge from 1981 to 1985, Corel North American Indoor in 1986 and Skydome World Tennis in 1990) was a professional men's tennis tournament played on indoor carpet courts, held at Maple Leaf Gardens. It was part of the Grand Prix tennis circuit and later, for one year, the ATP Championship Series of the ATP Tour.

== History ==
The tournament was established in 1972, becoming the second tournament held in Canada alongside the Canadian Open which alternated between Montreal, Quebec and Toronto, Ontario. The final event in 1990 was held at the Skydome.

It was held as an official tour event in consecutive years between 1972 and 1977, 1985 and 1986 and then again for a final time in 1990, as the first event on the newly formed ATP Tour. From 1972 to 1977, it was part of the World Championship Tennis-tour.

The first winner in 1972 was Rod Laver. During the second period, Kevin Curren won the first singles event by beating Anders Järryd, with Peter Fleming and Järryd taking the doubles title. Joakim Nyström took both titles the following year with victory against Milan Šrejber in the singles and partnering Wojciech Fibak to the doubles title. After the four-year break, Ivan Lendl took the final singles title, while Patrick Galbraith and David Macpherson won the doubles.

=== Molson Challenge/Molson Light Challenge ===
From 1981 to 1984, the tour event was replaced by an invitational competition featuring 8 players in a round-robin. It was decided to host a full tournament following the success of a standalone exhibition between Jimmy Connors and Ilie Năstase, staged the previous year at Maple Leaf Gardens in front of 12,000. It was put together by Concert Productions International, a Toronto-based company that promoted another lucrative exhibition tournament, the Challenge of Champions.

CPI made a substantial investment in the event's launch. The inaugural edition featured a $500,000 prize money pool, which was incorporated into its name. That amount included a $25,000 bounty-style bonus for the first player who could beat world number one Björn Borg, a novelty which left the Swedish star and some of his opponents unimpressed. Other expenses, including a sizeable advertising campaign, brought the budget for the five-day competition to more than $1 million. The players were contractually bound to help with promotion, and owed the promoters one newspaper, one radio and one TV appearance each. All of the Maple Leaf Gardens' 116 suites were sold, guaranteeing the event's viability. It was shown on CTV in Canada and on ESPN in the US. In 1982 two separate editions were held, one at the Gardens in February, and another at the Montreal Forum in October.

== Past finals ==
=== Key ===
WCT Circuit
Grand Prix Circuit/ATP Championship Series
Invitational Tournament

=== Singles ===
Year	Champions	Runners-up	Score
1972	(Australia) Rod Laver	(Australia) Ken Rosewall	6–1 6–4
1973	(Australia) Rod Laver	(Australia) Roy Emerson	6–3, 6–4
1974	(Netherlands) Tom Okker	(Romania) Ilie Năstase	6–3, 6–4
1975	(United States) Harold Solomon	(United States) Stan Smith	6–4, 6–1
1976	(Sweden) Björn Borg	(United States) Vitas Gerulaitis	2–6, 6–3, 6–1
1977	(United States) Dick Stockton	(United States) Jimmy Connors	5–6 Connors ret.
1981	(United States) Vitas Gerulaitis	(United States) John McEnroe	6–4, 4–6, 6–3, 6–3
1982 (Note: Played in Montreal.)	(United States) Jimmy Connors	(Sweden) Björn Borg	6–4, 6–3
1982 (Note: Played in Toronto.)	(Czechoslovakia) Ivan Lendl	(United States) John McEnroe	7–5, 3–6, 7–6, 7–5
1983	(United States) Jimmy Connors	(Spain) José Higueras	6–2, 6–0, 5–7, 6–0
1984	(Czechoslovakia) Ivan Lendl	(France) Yannick Noah	6–0, 6–2, 6–4
1985	(South Africa) Kevin Curren	(Sweden) Anders Järryd	7–6, 6–3
1986	(Sweden) Joakim Nyström	(Czechoslovakia) Milan Šrejber	6–1, 6–4
1990	(Czechoslovakia) Ivan Lendl	(United States) Tim Mayotte	6–3, 6–0

=== Doubles ===
Year	Champions	Runners-up	Score
1972	(Australia) Bob Carmichael (Australia) Ray Ruffels	(Australia) Roy Emerson (Australia) Rod Laver	6–4, 4–6, 6–4
1973	(Australia) John Alexander (Australia) Phil Dent	(Australia) Roy Emerson (Australia) Rod Laver	3–6, 6–4, 6–4, 6–2
1974	(Mexico) Raúl Ramírez (Australia) Tony Roche	(Netherlands) Tom Okker (United States) Marty Riessen	6–3, 2–6, 6–4
1975	(United States) Dick Stockton (United States) Erik van Dillen	(India) Anand Amritraj (India) Vijay Amritraj	6–4, 7–5, 6–1
1976	(Chile) Jaime Fillol (South Africa) Frew McMillan	(Soviet Union) Alexander Metreveli (Romania) Ilie Năstase	6–7^{(3–7)}, 6–2, 6–3
1977	(Poland) Wojciech Fibak (Netherlands) Tom Okker	(Australia) Ross Case (Australia) Tony Roche	6–4, 6–1
1985	(United States) Peter Fleming (Sweden) Anders Järryd	(United States) Glenn Layendecker (Canada) Glenn Michibata	7–6, 6–2
1986	(Poland) Wojciech Fibak (Sweden) Joakim Nyström	(South Africa) Christo Steyn (South Africa) Danie Visser	6–3, 7–6
1990	(United States) Patrick Galbraith (Australia) David Macpherson	(United Kingdom) Neil Broad (United States) Kevin Curren	2–6, 6–4, 6–3
