= 1982 Player's Canadian Open =

- Date: August 9–15 (men); August 16–22 (women)
- Edition: 93rd
- Surface: Hard / outdoor
- Location: Toronto, Ontario, Canada (men); Montreal, Quebec, Canada (women)

Champions

Men's singles
- (United States) Vitas Gerulaitis

Women's singles
- (United States) Martina Navratilova

Men's doubles
- (United States) Steve Denton / (Australia) Mark Edmondson

Women's doubles
- (United States) Martina Navratilova / (United States) Candy Reynolds
- Canadian Open

The 1982 Player's International Canadian Open was a tennis tournament played on outdoor hard courts. The men's tournament was held at the National Tennis Centre in Toronto in Canada and was part of the 1982 Volvo Grand Prix while the women's tournament was held at the Jarry Park Stadium in Montreal in Canada and was part of the 1982 WTA Tour. The men's tournament was held from August 9 through August 15, 1982, while the women's tournament was held from August 16 through August 22, 1982.

== Finals ==
=== Men's singles ===
(United States) Vitas Gerulaitis defeated (Czechoslovakia) Ivan Lendl 4–6, 6–1, 6–3

- It was Gerulaitis' 3rd title of the year and the 29th of his career.

=== Women's singles ===
(United States) Martina Navratilova defeated (United States) Andrea Jaeger 6–3, 7–5

- It was Navratilova's 19th title of the year and the 140th of her career.

=== Men's doubles ===
(United States) Steve Denton / (Australia) Mark Edmondson defeated (United States) Peter Fleming / (United States) John McEnroe 6–7, 7–5, 6–2

- It was Denton's 5th title of the year and the 13th of his career. It was Edmondson's 9th title of the year and the 28th of his career.

=== Women's doubles ===
(United States) Martina Navratilova / (United States) Candy Reynolds defeated (United States) Barbara Potter / (United States) Sharon Walsh 6–4, 6–4

- It was Navrátilová's 20th title of the year and the 141st of her career. It was Reynolds' 2nd title of the year and the 7th of her career.
