= Josef Brabenec =

Czechoslovak-born Canadian tennis player

- Country (sports): Canada
- Born: 24 April 1957 (age 68); Ostrava, Czechoslovakia
- Plays: Left-handed

Singles
- Career record: 0–1
- Highest ranking: No. 662 (4 January 1982)

Doubles
- Career record: 8–20
- Highest ranking: No. 155 (3 January 1983)

Grand Slam doubles results
- French Open: 2R (1983)
- Wimbledon: 1R (1980)

Grand Slam mixed doubles results
- French Open: 2R (1980, 1983)

Josef Brabenec Jr. (born 24 April 1957) is a Canadian former professional tennis player.

== Biography ==
Brabenec, who was born in Czechoslovakia, won the Canadian national indoor singles championships in 1979.

A left-handed player, he featured primarily in doubles while competing on the Grand Prix circuit in the 1980s. His best performance came at the 1982 Canadian Open, where he partnered with Ivan Lendl to reach the doubles semi-finals. He made doubles main draw appearances at both the French Open and Wimbledon.

Between 1980 and 1985 he represented the Canada Davis Cup team, which for much of this time was coached by his father, Josef Brabenec Sr. In his debut tie against the Caribbean/West Indies he played and won two singles rubbers, but in his five other appearance was used as a doubles specialist.

== See also ==
- List of Canada Davis Cup team representatives
