= Glenn Michibata =

Canadian tennis player (born 1962)

- Country (sports): Canada
- Residence: West Windsor Township, New Jersey, United States
- Born: 13 June 1962 (age 64) Toronto, Ontario, Canada
- Height: 5 ft 9 in (1.75 m)
- Turned pro: 1983
- Retired: 1993
- Plays: Right-handed
- Prize money: $ 1,081,207

Singles
- Career record: 72–115
- Career titles: 0; 0 Challenger, 0 Futures
- Highest ranking: No. 48 (7 April 1986)

Grand Slam singles results
- Australian Open: 2R (1988)
- French Open: 2R (1989)
- Wimbledon: 2R (1984, 1988, 1991)
- US Open: 2R (1988, 1989)

Doubles
- Career record: 249–207
- Career titles: 4; 0 Challenger, 0 Futures
- Highest ranking: No. 5 (8 July 1991)

Grand Slam doubles results
- Australian Open: F (1990)
- French Open: SF (1991)
- Wimbledon: SF (1991)
- US Open: 3R (1990, 1992)

Other doubles tournaments
- Olympic Games: 1R (1988)

Grand Slam mixed doubles results
- Australian Open: SF (1993)
- French Open: QF (1992)
- Wimbledon: QF (1991)
- US Open: SF (1992)
- Last updated on: 17 June 2022.

Glenn Michibata (born 13 June 1962) is a former professional tennis player and former head coach of the Princeton University Tigers tennis team.

== Playing career ==
=== Collegiate career ===
Before turning pro, Michibata was an All-American player at Pepperdine University in the 1981, 1982 and 1983 seasons.

=== Professional career – singles ===
In 1982, Michibata won the Canadian National Tennis Championships (closed) defeating Réjean Genois in the final.

An ATP touring professional from 1983 to 1993, Michibata earned a career-high singles ranking of world No. 48 in April 1986. His best results were the semifinals at the 1985 outdoor Tokyo, 1989 Wellington, and 1989 Schenectady Grand Prix events.

Michibata reached the second round in all four Grand Slam tournaments, but never further. His first Grand Slam appearance was at the 1983 US Open, when he lost in the second round to Pat Cash. His last was also at the US Open in 1991, when he lost in the first round to Nuno Marques. Michibata only played all four Grand Slams in the same year in 1989, reaching the second round at the French Open and US Open and losing in the first round at the Australian Open and Wimbledon.

=== Professional career – doubles ===
Michibata had more success as a doubles player. Much of this success came with fellow Canadian Grant Connell, including four titles. In 1990, Michibata and Connell were finalists at the Australian Open. Michibata's highest doubles ranking was #5 on 8 July 1991 after he and Connell reached the semifinals of both the French Open and Wimbledon Championships. Coincidentally, they lost both of these semifinals to John Fitzgerald and Anders Järryd.

=== Davis Cup and Olympics ===
Michibata competed for 14 Canadian Davis Cup teams between 1982 and 1992. He went 4 and 10 in singles and 7 and 8 in doubles. The Connell-Michibata pair won a crucial match in a 1990 tie against the Dutchmen Paul Haarhuis and Mark Koevermans 7–6^{(7–5)}, 7–6^{(7–5)}, 6–2, as Canada defeated the Netherlands 3–2 in the qualifying round for the 1991 World Group. Unfortunately the Canadian team as well as the Connell-Michibata pairing lost in the first round of the World Group in 1991 as well as the following year, two of the only three times Canada has competed in the World Group since its inception in 1981.

Michibata also competed in Men's Doubles with Grant Connell at the 1988 Olympics in Seoul. They were seeded 6th, but lost in the first round to Moreten Christensen and Michael Tauson of Denmark.

== Coaching career ==
After retiring as a player, Michibata became the director of tennis at Whistler Racquet and Golf Resort in Whistler, British Columbia. Also, Michibata coached the doubles team of fellow Canadian Daniel Nestor and Mark Knowles for two years (1995–1997).

In 1997, Michibata became an assistant tennis coach at the University of Southern California, staying there until 2000, when he moved to Princeton University to become the head coach of its tennis program. He remained at Princeton for 12 years during which time he had a 145–121 record, including winning records in seven Ivy League seasons, and three Ivy League Players of the Year.

Michibata has remained in the Princeton area, and he is currently director of elite and tournament training for the Princeton Tennis Program, where he coaches many nationally ranked players.

== Personal life ==
Michibata is married and has a son and a daughter. In 1999, he was inducted into both the Canadian Tennis Hall of Fame in 1999. and the Etobicoke Sports Hall of Fame. Michibata and Grant Connell were inducted into the Rogers Cup Hall of Fame in 2010.

== ATP career finals ==
=== Doubles: 27 (4 titles / 23 runner-ups) ===
Finals by category Grand Slam Tournaments (0–1) ATP World Tour Finals (0–0) ATP World Tour Masters Series (0–3) ATP Championship Series (1–4) ATP World Series (3–15)	Finals by surface Hard (4–18) Clay (0–0) Grass (0–2) Carpet (0–3)	Finals by setting Outdoors (4–19) Indoors (0–4)

Result	W–L	Date	Tournament	Tier	Surface	Partner	Opponents	Score
Loss	0–1	Aug 1984	Livingston, United States	Grand Prix	Hard	(United States) Paul Annacone	(United States) Scott Davis (United States) Ben Testerman	4–6, 4–6
Loss	0–2	Feb 1985	Toronto, Canada	Grand Prix	Carpet	(United States) Glenn Layendecker	(United States) Peter Fleming (Sweden) Anders Järryd	6–7, 2–6
Loss	0–3	Jan 1988	Wellington, New Zealand	Grand Prix	Hard	(Australia) Broderick Dyke	(United States) Dan Goldie (United States) Rick Leach	2–6, 3–6
Win	1–3	Aug 1988	Livingston, United States	Grand Prix	Hard	(Canada) Grant Connell	(United States) Marc Flur (United States) Sammy Giammalva Jr.	2–6, 6–4, 7–5
Loss	1–4	Oct 1988	Brisbane, Australia	Grand Prix	Hard	(Canada) Grant Connell	(Germany) Eric Jelen (Germany) Carl-Uwe Steeb	4–6, 3–6
Loss	1–5	Jan 1989	Wellington, New Zealand	Grand Prix	Hard	(United States) Rill Baxter	(Australia) Peter Doohan (Australia) Laurie Warder	6–3, 2–6, 3–6
Loss	1–6	Jan 1990	Melbourne, Australia	Grand Slam	Hard	(Canada) Grant Connell	(South Africa) Pieter Aldrich (South Africa) Danie Visser	4–6, 6–4, 1–6, 4–6
Loss	1–7	Feb 1990	Philadelphia, United States	Championship Series	Carpet	(Canada) Grant Connell	(United States) Rick Leach (United States) Jim Pugh	6–3, 4–6, 2–6
Win	2–7	Apr 1990	Seoul, South Korea	World Series	Hard	(Canada) Grant Connell	(Australia) Jason Stoltenberg (Australia) Todd Woodbridge	7–6, 6–4
Win	3–7	Jul 1990	Washington, United States	Championship Series	Hard	(Canada) Grant Connell	(Mexico) Jorge Lozano (United States) Todd Witsken	6–3, 6–7, 6–2
Loss	3–8	Aug 1990	Indianapolis, United States	Championship Series	Hard	(Canada) Grant Connell	(United States) Scott Davis (United States) David Pate	6–7, 6–7
Loss	3–9	Jan 1991	Auckland, New Zealand	World Series	Hard	(Canada) Grant Connell	(Spain) Sergio Casal (Spain) Emilio Sánchez	6–4, 3–6, 4–6
Loss	3–10	Mar 1991	Chicago, United States	World Series	Carpet	(Canada) Grant Connell	(United States) Scott Davis (United States) David Pate	4–6, 7–5, 6–7
Loss	3–11	Apr 1991	Hong Kong, Hong Kong	World Series	Hard	(United States) Robert Van't Hof	(United States) Patrick Galbraith (United States) Todd Witsken	2–6, 4–6
Win	4–11	Apr 1991	Singapore, Singapore	World Series	Hard	(Canada) Grant Connell	(South Africa) Stefan Kruger (South Africa) Christo van Rensburg	6–4, 5–7, 7–6
Loss	4–12	Jun 1991	Queen's, United Kingdom	World Series	Grass	(Canada) Grant Connell	(Australia) Todd Woodbridge (Australia) Mark Woodforde	4–6, 6–7
Loss	4–13	Jul 1991	Montreal, Canada	Masters Series	Hard	(Canada) Grant Connell	(United States) Patrick Galbraith (United States) Todd Witsken	4–6, 6–3, 1–6
Loss	4–14	Aug 1991	Los Angeles, United States	World Series	Hard	(United States) Brad Pearce	(Argentina) Javier Frana (United States) Jim Pugh	5–7, 6–2, 4–6
Loss	4–15	Aug 1991	Cincinnati, United States	Masters Series	Hard	(Canada) Grant Connell	(United States) Ken Flach (United States) Robert Seguso	7–6, 4–6, 5–7
Loss	4–16	Sep 1991	Brisbane, Australia	World Series	Hard	(Australia) John Fitzgerald	(Australia) Todd Woodbridge (Australia) Mark Woodforde	6–7, 3–6
Loss	4–17	Jan 1992	Auckland, New Zealand	World Series	Hard	(Canada) Grant Connell	(South Africa) Wayne Ferreira (United States) Todd Witsken	4–6, 3–6
Loss	4–18	Apr 1992	Singapore, Singapore	World Series	Hard	(Canada) Grant Connell	(Australia) Todd Woodbridge (Australia) Mark Woodforde	7–6, 2–6, 4–6
Loss	4–19	Aug 1992	Indianapolis, United States	Championship Series	Hard	(Canada) Grant Connell	(United States) Jim Grabb (United States) Richey Reneberg	6–7, 2–6
Loss	4–20	Apr 1993	Osaka, Japan	World Series	Hard	(United States) David Pate	(United States) Mark Keil (South Africa) Christo van Rensburg	6–7, 3–6
Loss	4–21	Apr 1993	Tokyo, Japan	Championship Series	Hard	(United States) David Pate	(United States) Ken Flach (United States) Rick Leach	6–2, 3–6, 4–6
Loss	4–22	Jun 1993	Manchester, United Kingdom	World Series	Grass	(South Africa) Stefan Kruger	(United States) Ken Flach (United States) Rick Leach	4–6, 1–6
Loss	4–23	Aug 1993	Montreal, Canada	Masters Series	Hard	(United States) David Pate	(United States) Jim Courier (The Bahamas) Mark Knowles	4–6, 6–7

== Performance timelines ==
Key
W	F	SF	QF	#R	RR	Q#	DNQ	A	NH

(W) winner; (F) finalist; (SF) semifinalist; (QF) quarterfinalist; (#R) rounds 4, 3, 2, 1; (RR) round-robin stage; (Q#) qualification round; (DNQ) did not qualify; (A) absent; (NH) not held; (SR) strike rate (events won / competed); (W–L) win–loss record.

=== Singles ===
Tournament	1979	1980	1981	1982	1983	1984	1985	1986	1987	1988	1989	1990	1991	1992	1993	SR	W–L	Win %
Grand Slam tournaments
Australian Open	A	A	A	A	A	A	A	NH	1R	2R	1R	Q2	A	A	A	0 / 3	1–3	25%
French Open	A	A	A	A	A	1R	A	1R	1R	A	2R	A	A	A	A	0 / 4	1–4	20%
Wimbledon	A	A	A	A	A	2R	Q3	1R	A	2R	1R	Q3	2R	Q1	A	0 / 5	3–5	38%
US Open	A	A	A	A	2R	1R	A	1R	A	A	2R	A	1R	Q1	A	0 / 5	2–5	29%
Win–loss	0–0	0–0	0–0	0–0	1–1	1–3	0–0	0–3	0–2	2–2	2–4	0–0	1–2	0–0	0–0	0 / 17	7–17	29%
ATP Masters Series
Miami	A	A	A	A	A	A	A	2R	A	1R	2R	A	A	A	Q1	0 / 3	2–3	40%
Canada	1R	1R	1R	3R	1R	1R	2R	1R	A	2R	1R	1R	A	Q1	Q1	0 / 11	4–11	27%
Cincinnati	A	A	A	A	2R	A	A	2R	A	A	A	A	A	A	A	0 / 2	2–2	50%
Win–loss	0–1	0–1	0–1	2–1	1–2	0–1	1–1	2–3	0–0	1–2	1–2	0–1	0–0	0–0	0–0	0 / 16	8–16	33%

=== Doubles ===
Tournament	1979	1980	1981	1982	1983	1984	1985	1986	1987	1988	1989	1990	1991	1992	1993	1994	1995	1996	SR	W–L	Win %
Grand Slam tournaments
Australian Open	A	A	A	A	A	A	A	A	2R	QF	QF	F	3R	3R	2R	A	A	A	0 / 7	17–7	71%
French Open	A	A	A	A	A	A	A	3R	1R	A	1R	3R	SF	2R	3R	A	A	A	0 / 7	11–7	61%
Wimbledon	A	A	A	A	A	1R	2R	1R	2R	3R	1R	QF	SF	2R	2R	A	A	A	0 / 10	13–10	57%
US Open	A	A	A	A	A	A	A	1R	2R	A	1R	3R	2R	3R	1R	A	A	A	0 / 7	6–7	46%
Win–loss	0–0	0–0	0–0	0–0	0–0	0–1	1–1	2–3	3–4	5–2	3–4	12–4	11–4	6–4	5–4	0–0	0–0	0–0	0 / 31	47–31	60%
National Representation
Summer Olympics	NH	A	Not Held			A	Not Held			1R	Not Held			A	Not Held			A	0 / 1	0–1	0%
Year-End Championships
ATP Finals	Did not qualify											SF	SF	Did not qualify					0 / 2	4–4	50%
ATP Masters Series
Indian Wells	A	A	A	A	A	A	A	A	A	A	2R	2R	2R	QF	1R	A	A	A	0 / 5	4–5	44%
Miami	A	A	A	A	A	A	A	2R	QF	1R	2R	3R	2R	3R	1R	A	A	1R	0 / 9	7–9	44%
Canada	1R	1R	2R	1R	1R	A	A	QF	1R	QF	2R	SF	F	1R	F	A	A	1R	0 / 14	15–14	52%
Cincinnati	A	A	A	A	A	A	A	QF	A	A	A	2R	F	2R	QF	A	A	1R	0 / 6	8–6	57%
Paris	A	A	A	A	A	A	A	A	A	A	A	2R	2R	2R	1R	A	A	A	0 / 4	1–4	20%
Win–loss	0–1	0–1	1–1	0–1	0–1	0–0	0–0	5–3	3–2	2–2	2–3	4–5	7–5	4–5	6–5	0–0	0–0	1–3	0 / 38	35–38	48%

=== Mixed Doubles ===
Tournament	1985	1986	1987	1988	1989	1990	1991	1992	1993	SR	W–L	Win %
Grand Slam tournaments
Australian Open	A	NH	A	A	A	A	2R	1R	SF	0 / 3	4–3	57%
French Open	A	2R	A	A	A	A	2R	QF	A	0 / 3	4–3	57%
Wimbledon	1R	A	1R	A	1R	3R	QF	1R	3R	0 / 7	7–7	50%
US Open	A	A	A	A	A	A	QF	SF	QF	0 / 3	7–3	70%
Win–loss	0–1	1–1	0–1	0–0	0–1	2–1	7–4	5–4	7–3	0 / 16	22–16	58%
